= List of Scotland international footballers (4–9 caps) =

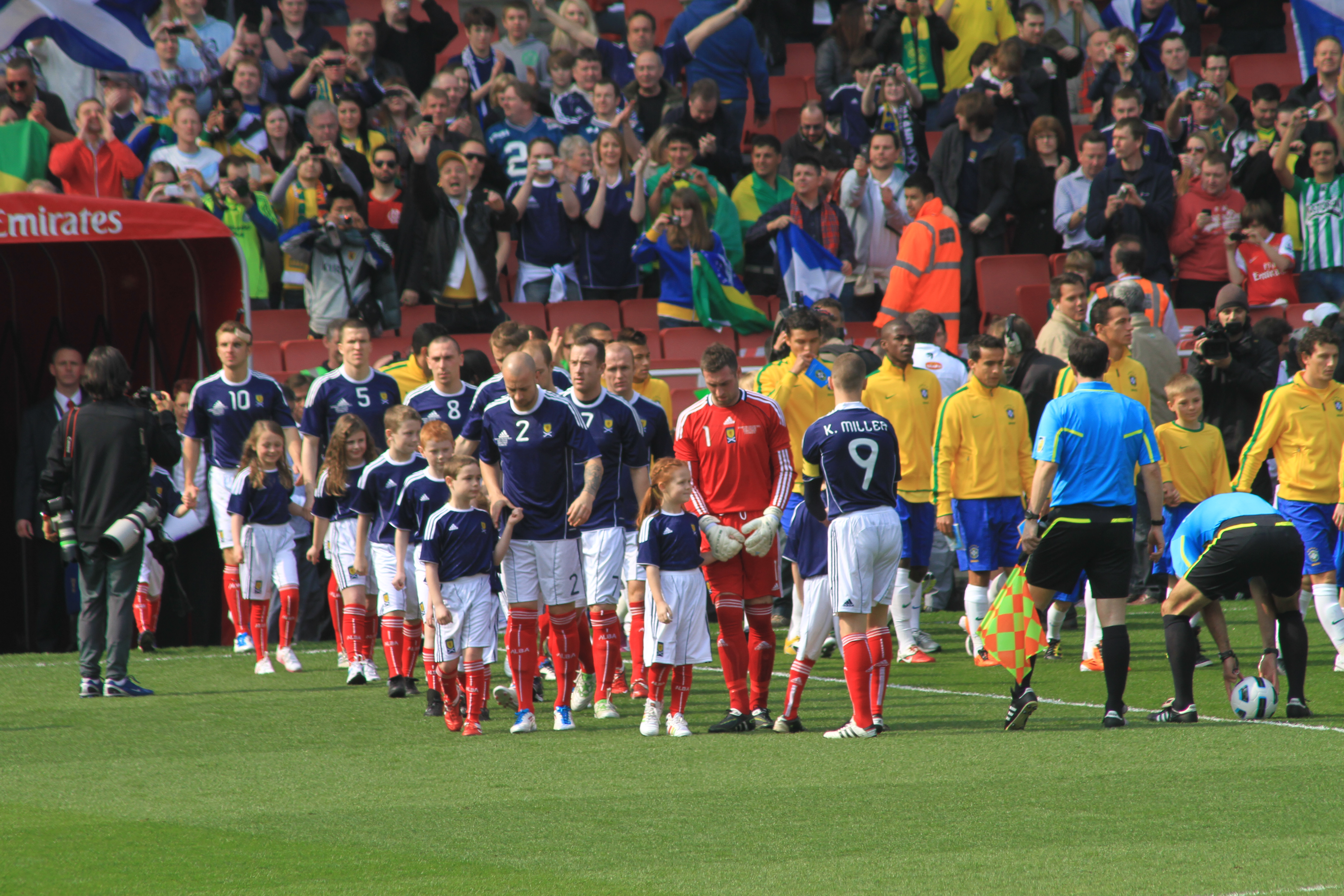
The Scotland players (in blue) come onto the pitch for a friendly against Brazil in 2011

The Scotland national football team is the joint-oldest international football team, having played in the first official international match, a goalless draw on 30 November 1872 against England. Since then, the team has established a long-standing rivalry with England, particularly in the annual British Home Championship, which Scotland won 24 times outright and shared a further 17 times. The team has enjoyed less success in continental and global competition. Although Scotland has participated in eight FIFA World Cup and three UEFA European Championship final tournaments, the team has never progressed beyond the first round of any major tournament.

Kenny Dalglish and Andy Robertson are the only men to have won more than 100 caps for Scotland, and Dalglish was the only Scottish player named in the FIFA 100. Denis Law, who shares with Dalglish the record for the most goals scored for the national team, is the only Scottish player to have won the European Footballer of the Year award. The Scottish Football Association maintains a roll of honour for players who have won at least 50 caps. This distinction was launched in March 1998, when 11 players had already achieved that mark.

This list includes all players with between 4 and 9 appearances for the national team.

== List of players ==
Key

*	Still active for the national team

As of Scotland v North Macedonia, 13 November 2026

Scotland national football team players with 4 to 9 caps
Player	Refs.	Caps	Goals	Debut		Last or most recent match	
Player	Refs.	Caps	Goals	Date	Opponent	Date	Opponent
Jock Aird		4	0	5 May 1954	Norway	19 June 1954	Uruguay
George Aitken		8	0	9 April 1949	England	3 April 1954	England
Alan Anderson		5	0	16 May 1967	Israel	13 June 1967	Canada Olympic team
William Anderson		6	3	11 March 1882	England	23 March 1885	Wales
Sandy Archibald		8	1	12 February 1921	Wales	9 April 1932	England
Scott Bain*		4	0	3 June 2018	Mexico	31 March 2026	Ivory Coast
Sammy Baird		7	2	21 November 1956	Yugoslavia	15 June 1958	France
David Bates*		4	0	17 November 2018	Albania	24 March 2019	San Marino
Andy Beattie (Note: The Scottish FA profile attributes an appearance by Andy Beattie on 8 October 1938 to Bobby Beattie.)		7	0	17 April 1937	England	7 December 1938	Hungary
Craig Beattie		7	1	3 September 2005	Italy	17 October 2007	Georgia
Isaac Begbie		4	0	29 March 1890	Ireland	7 April 1894	England
William Berry		4	0	17 March 1888	England	4 April 1891	England
John Blackley		7	0	17 October 1973	Czechoslovakia	27 April 1977	Sweden
Danny Blair		8	0	27 October 1928	Wales	26 October 1932	Wales
Jimmy Blair		8	0	13 March 1920	Ireland	16 February 1924	Wales
James Blessington		4	1	31 March 1894	Ireland	4 April 1896	England
Kieron Bowie*		6	1	9 June 2025	Liechtenstein	6 October 2026	Slovenia
Dave Bowman		6	0	25 March 1992	Finland	13 October 1993	Italy
Ralph Brand		8	8	9 November 1960	Northern Ireland	2 May 1962	Uruguay
Frank Brennan		8	0	15 May 1946	Switzerland	3 April 1954	England
Kirk Broadfoot		4	1	10 September 2008	Iceland	11 August 2010	Sweden
Jim Brogan		4	0	21 April 1971	Portugal	22 May 1971	England
Bobby Brown		5	0	23 January 1946	Belgium	5 April 1952	England
Jacob Brown		8	0	12 November 2021	Moldova	19 November 2023	Norway
John Brownlie		7	0	14 June 1971	Soviet Union	17 December 1975	Romania
Mark Burchill		6	0	5 October 1999	Bosnia and Herzegovina	26 April 2000	Netherlands
Chris Burke		7	2	11 May 2006	Bulgaria	5 March 2014	Poland
Tommy Burns		8	0	19 May 1981	Northern Ireland	21 May 1988	England
Tommy Cairns		8	1	26 February 1920	Wales	4 April 1925	England
Willie Callaghan		6	0	16 May 1967	Israel	22 April 1970	Wales
Billy Campbell		5	0	15 May 1946	Switzerland	17 May 1948	Switzerland
Bobby Campbell		5	1	18 May 1947	Belgium	27 May 1950	France
John Campbell		4	5	18 March 1899	Wales	23 February 1901	Ireland
Kenny Campbell		8	0	26 February 1920	Wales	8 April 1922	England
Willie Carr		6	0	18 April 1970	Northern Ireland	15 November 1972	Denmark
Joe Cassidy		4	1	12 February 1921	Wales	16 February 1924	Wales
Stevie Chalmers		5	3	3 October 1964	Wales	16 November 1966	Northern Ireland
Alec Cheyne		5	4	13 April 1929	England	18 May 1930	France
John Clark		4	0	25 June 1966	Brazil	10 May 1967	Soviet Union
Zander Clark		4	0	17 October 2023	France	3 June 2024	Gibraltar
Steve Clarke		6	0	9 September 1987	Hungary	27 May 1994	Netherlands
Donald Colman		4	0	6 March 1911	Wales	15 March 1913	Ireland
Bobby Connor		4	0	29 April 1986	Netherlands	12 September 1990	Romania
Jimmy Connor (Note: The Scottish FA website merges the statistics of James Connor (active in the 1880s) and Jimmy Connor (active in the 1930s) into a single profile.)		4	0	18 May 1930	France	20 October 1934	Ireland
Craig Conway		7	0	10 October 2009	Japan	19 November 2013	Norway
Tommy Conway*		8	0	7 June 2024	Finland	31 March 2026	Ivory Coast
Peter Cormack		9	0	25 June 1955	Brazil	1 December 1971	Netherlands
Tully Craig		8	1	26 February 1927	Ireland	5 April 1930	England
Jimmy Crapnell		9	0	13 April 1929	England	17 September 1932	Ireland
James Crawford		5	0	19 September 1931	Ireland	1 April 1933	England
William Cringan		5	0	26 February 1920	Wales	14 April 1923	England
Jim Cruickshank		9	0	12 May 1964	West Germany	17 December 1975	Romania
John Cumming		9	0	8 December 1954	Hungary	8 June 1960	Turkey
George Cummings		9	0	6 April 1935	England	15 April 1939	England
Willie Cunningham		8	0	5 May 1954	Norway	2 April 1955	England
Hugh Curran		5	1	5 November 1969	Austria	14 June 1971	Soviet Union
Findlay Curtis*		6	1	28 March 2026	Japan	6 October 2026	Slovenia
David Davidson		5	1	23 March 1878	Wales	14 March 1881	Wales
Jimmy Davidson		8	1	5 May 1954	Norway	2 April 1955	England
Ally Dawson		5	0	28 May 1980	Poland	12 June 1983	Canada
Billy Dickson		5	0	18 April 1970	Northern Ireland	14 June 1971	Soviet Union
Scott Dobie		6	1	16 May 2002	South Korea	20 November 2002	Portugal
Ned Doig		5	0	19 February 1887	Ireland	4 April 1903	England
Alex Donaldson		6	1	28 February 1914	Wales	4 March 1922	Ireland
Dan Doyle		8	0	2 April 1892	England	2 April 1898	England
Arthur Duncan		6	0	13 May 1975	Portugal	3 September 1975	Denmark
Jimmy Dunn		6	2	14 February 1925	Wales	27 October 1928	Wales
Allan Evans		4	0	23 March 1982	Netherlands	15 June 1982	New Zealand
Alex Ferguson		4	4	16 May 1967	Israel	3 June 1967	Australia
Bobby Ferguson		7	0	24 November 1965	Wales	16 November 1966	Northern Ireland
Duncan Ferguson		7	0	17 May 1992	United States	11 February 1997	Estonia
Ian Ferguson		9	0	22 December 1988	Italy	11 February 1997	Estonia
John Ferguson		6	5	7 March 1874	England	23 March 1878	Wales
Thomas Fitchie		4	1	6 March 1905	Wales	4 March 1907	Wales
John Fleck		5	0	10 October 2019	Russia	31 March 2021	Faroe Islands
Robert Fleck		4	0	28 March 1990	Argentina	6 February 1991	Soviet Union
John Forbes		5	0	26 January 1884	Ireland	21 March 1887	Wales
Jim Forrest		5	0	24 November 1965	Wales	14 June 1971	Soviet Union
Campbell Forsyth		4	0	11 April 1964	England	25 November 1964	Northern Ireland
Craig Forsyth		4	0	28 May 2014	Nigeria	13 June 2015	Republic of Ireland
Danny Fox		4	0	14 November 2009	Wales	16 October 2012	Belgium
Doug Fraser		7	0	16 May 1967	Israel	11 December 1968	Cyprus
Eadie Fraser		5	4	27 March 1880	Wales	12 March 1883	Wales
Paul Gallacher		8	0	23 May 2002	Hong Kong League XI	27 May 2004	Estonia
Declan Gallagher		9	0	16 November 2019	Cyprus	6 June 2021	Luxembourg
Robert Gardner		5	0	30 November 1872	England	2 March 1878	England
Ryan Gauld		6	0	5 September 2024	Poland	18 November 2024	Poland
Dave Gibson		7	3	8 May 1963	Austria	21 October 1964	Finland
Jimmy Gibson		8	1	17 April 1926	England	22 February 1930	Ireland
George Gillespie		7	0	27 March 1880	Wales	28 March 1891	Ireland
Robert Gillespie		4	0	30 October 1926	Wales	1 April 1933	England
Torrance Gillick		5	3	9 May 1937	Austria	7 December 1938	Hungary
Jock Govan		6	0	12 November 1947	Wales	17 November 1948	Ireland
Tony Green		6	0	3 February 1971	Belgium	27 May 1972	England
William Gulliland		4	0	21 March 1891	Wales	6 April 1895	England
Bryan Gunn		6	0	16 May 1990	Egypt	27 May 1994	Netherlands
Harry Haddock		6	0	8 December 1954	Hungary	19 April 1958	England
Alexander Hamilton		4	0	21 March 1885	England	17 March 1888	England
George Hamilton		5	4	27 November 1946	Ireland	19 May 1954	Norway
Joe Harper		5	7	13 June 1967	Canada Olympic team	7 June 1978	Iran
Paul Hegarty		8	0	19 May 1979	Wales	24 May 1983	Northern Ireland
Jackie Henderson		7	1	6 May 1953	Sweden	5 November 1958	Northern Ireland
David Herd		5	3	18 October 1958	Wales	14 May 1961	Czechoslovakia
George Herd		5	1	19 April 1958	England	9 November 1960	Northern Ireland
Jim Herriot		8	0	16 October 1968	Denmark	22 October 1969	West Germany
Sandy Higgins		4	1	19 March 1910	Ireland	1 April 1911	England
Thomas Highet		4	1	6 March 1875	England	2 March 1878	England
David Holt		5	0	8 May 1963	Austria	12 May 1964	West Germany
Bobby Hope		7	1	16 May 1967	Israel	16 October 1968	Denmark
David Hopkin		7	2	1 June 1997	Malta	5 October 1999	Bosnia and Herzegovina
John Hughes		8	1	8 May 1965	Spain	21 September 1969	Republic of Ireland
Richard Hughes		5	0	27 May 2004	Estonia	17 August 2005	Austria
Ally Hunter		4	0	26 April 1972	Peru	26 September 1973	Czechoslovakia
John Hunter (Note: The Scottish FA website merges the statistics of John Hunter (born 1878) and John Hunter (active in the 1870s) into a single profile.)		4	0	7 March 1874	England	5 March 1877	Wales
Dominic Hyam*		4	0	17 June 2023	Norway	6 June 2026	Bolivia
Stewart Imlach		4	0	7 May 1958	Hungary	15 June 1958	France
Brian Irvine		9	0	12 September 1990	Romania	27 May 1994	Netherlands
Chris Iwelumo		4	0	11 October 2008	Norway	8 October 2010	Czech Republic
Colin Jackson		8	1	16 April 1975	Sweden	15 May 1976	England
John Jackson		8	0	16 May 1931	Austria	13 November 1935	Ireland
Tom Jackson		6	0	12 March 1904	Wales	16 March 1907	Ireland
Alex James (Note: There is some uncertainty over the sixth Scotland goal in a 7–3 win over Ireland in 1929: both Hughie Gallacher, who had already scored four times, and Alex James went for the ball at the same point. Correspondence between Queen of the South FC and the Scottish Football Museum in 2016 favoured Gallacher, stating "Hughie himself was insistent that the goal was his, claiming that as he and Alex James (who was a good friend of his) were of a similar build (and of course in 1929 there were no numbers on the jerseys), it was easy for pressmen to make a mistake". James remains credited with the goal in some sources, including the Scottish Football Association website profiles, while the Scottish Football Hall of Fame include the contradictory statement that Gallacher's total was 23 goals but that he scored a record five in a match against Ireland.)		8	3	31 October 1925	Wales	26 October 1932	Wales
Max Johnston		4	0	20 March 2025	Greece	8 September 2025	Belarus
John Kay		6	5	13 March 1880	England	29 March 1884	Wales
Alex Keillor		6	2	21 March 1891	Wales	20 March 1897	Wales
Leitch Keir (Note: The Scottish FA website attributes the 1885 appearance by Hugh Wilson to Leitch Keir.)		4	1	20 March 1886	Ireland	17 March 1888	England
James Kelly (Note: Some sources attribute Kelly's first cap and goal in 1886 to John Lambie who had to withdraw from the team at short notice but was still included in match reports.)		9	2	20 March 1886	Ireland	28 March 1896	Ireland
Bob Kelso		7	0	14 March 1885	Ireland	26 March 1898	Ireland
Jim Kennedy		6	0	20 November 1963	Wales	25 November 1964	Northern Ireland
Sandy Kennedy (Note: The Scottish FA profile attributes an appearance by Sandy Kennedy on 25 March 1876 to Jack Kennedy.)		6	0	6 March 1875	England	29 March 1884	Wales
Stewart Kennedy		5	0	16 April 1975	Sweden	24 May 1975	England
Stuart Kennedy		8	0	22 February 1978	Bulgaria	18 November 1981	Portugal
George Ker		5	10	13 March 1880	England	25 March 1882	Wales
Alexander King		6	1	21 March 1896	Wales	25 March 1899	Ireland
William Lambie		9	5	19 March 1892	Ireland	3 April 1897	England
Lawrie Leslie		5	0	22 October 1960	Wales	14 May 1961	Czechoslovakia
Joseph Lindsay		8	6	27 March 1880	Wales	27 March 1886	England
Wilf Low		5	0	6 March 1911	Wales	10 April 1920	England
Archie Macaulay		7	0	12 April 1947	England	23 May 1948	France
Ted MacDougall		7	3	16 April 1975	Sweden	17 December 1975	Romania
Sandy MacFarlane		5	1	12 March 1904	Wales	6 March 1911	Wales
Craig Mackail-Smith		7	1	27 March 2011	Brazil	26 May 2012	United States
Gary Mackay		4	1	11 November 1987	Republic of Ireland	22 March 1988	Malta
Malky Mackay		5	0	28 April 2004	Denmark	8 September 2004	Slovenia
Jamie Mackie		9	2	8 October 2010	Czech Republic	16 October 2012	Belgium
Billy MacKinnon		9	5	30 November 1872	England	5 April 1879	England
Johnny MacLeod		4	0	15 April 1961	England	14 May 1961	Czechoslovakia
Jack Marshall (Note: The Scottish FA website merges the statistics of Jack Marshall (born 1892) and John Marshall (active in the 1880s) into a single profile.)		7	0	12 February 1921	Wales	16 February 1924	Wales
John Marshall		4	1	14 March 1885	Ireland	21 March 1887	Wales
Fred Martin		6	0	5 May 1954	Norway	2 April 1955	England
Jimmy Mason		7	4	23 October 1948	Wales	27 May 1951	Austria
Dominic Matteo		6	0	15 November 2000	Australia	27 March 2002	France
John May		5	0	3 March 1906	Wales	1 March 1909	Wales
James McAulay (Note: The Scottish FA profile attributes an appearance by Bob McAuley on 31 October 1931 to James McAulay.)		9	1	25 March 1882	Wales	21 March 1887	Wales
Frank McAvennie		5	1	20 November 1985	Australia	17 February 1988	Saudi Arabia
Peter McBride		6	0	9 April 1904	England	1 March 1909	Wales
James McCall		5	2	10 April 1886	Wales	5 April 1890	England
Bert McCann		5	0	6 May 1959	West Germany	15 April 1961	England
Peter McCloy		4	0	12 May 1973	Wales	30 June 1973	Brazil
Andy McCombie		4	0	9 March 1903	Wales	1 April 1905	England
David McCulloch		7	3	21 November 1934	Wales	7 December 1938	Hungary
Kevin McDonald		5	0	23 March 2018	Costa Rica	14 October 2018	Portugal
John McDougall		5	4	3 March 1877	England	7 April 1879	Wales
Frank McGarvey		7	0	22 May 1979	Northern Ireland	28 February 1984	Wales
Alex McGeoch		4	0	4 March 1876	England	5 March 1877	Wales
Mark McGhee		4	2	12 June 1983	Canada	26 May 1984	England
Peter McGonagle		6	0	1 April 1933	England	21 November 1934	Wales
John McGregor		4	1	3 March 1877	England	13 March 1880	England
Jackie McGrory		6	0	21 October 1964	Finland	13 June 1967	Canada Olympic team
Jimmy McGrory (Note: The Scottish FA profile omits a goal scored by Jimmy McGrory on 28 March 1931.)		7	6	25 February 1928	Ireland	16 September 1933	Ireland
Alan McInally		8	3	8 February 1989	Cyprus	11 June 1990	Costa Rica
John McKenzie		9	1	4 November 1953	Wales	2 May 1956	Austria
William McKinnon		4	0	10 March 1883	England	29 March 1884	Wales
Andy McLaren		4	4	12 April 1947	England	12 November 1947	Wales
Sandy McLaren		5	0	26 May 1929	Norway	26 October 1932	Wales
Adam McLean		4	1	31 October 1925	Wales	2 April 1927	England
Tommy McLean (Note: The Scottish FA profile attributes an appearance made by Tommy McLean on 16 October 1968 to George McLean.)		9	1	31 May 1967	Australia	9 June 1971	Denmark
Donald McLeod		4	0	18 March 1905	Ireland	7 April 1906	England
John McLeod		5	0	24 March 1888	Ireland	18 March 1893	Wales
Frank McLintock		9	1	4 June 1963	Norway	22 May 1971	England
Sandy McMahon		6	4	2 April 1892	England	15 March 1902	Wales
Ian McMillan		6	2	5 April 1952	England	14 May 1961	Czechoslovakia
Colin McNab		6	0	25 October 1930	Wales	9 April 1932	England
David McNamee		4	0	27 May 2004	Estonia	13 May 2006	Japan
Willie McNaught		5	0	21 October 1950	Wales	3 November 1954	Northern Ireland
Kevin McNaughton		4	0	17 April 2002	Nigeria	30 May 2008	Czech Republic
John McPhail		5	3	9 November 1949	Wales	3 October 1953	Northern Ireland
John McPherson (Note: The Scottish FA website attributes 1890 and 1891 appearances by John McPherson (born 1863) to John McPherson (born 1868). Although most sources do attribute six goals, many include a goal against Ireland in 1890, though contemporary reports awarded it to Gilbert Rankin; this is balanced by a goal scored by McPherson against England in 1894, attributed to Sandy McMahon in some sources.)		8	6	10 March 1888	Wales	27 March 1897	Ireland
John McPherson		8	0	5 April 1879	England	14 March 1885	Ireland
Peter McWilliam		8	0	1 April 1905	England	6 March 1911	Wales
John Miller		5	0	28 March 1931	England	14 April 1934	England
Lennon Miller*		4	0	6 June 2025	Iceland	12 October 2025	Belarus
Willie Miller		6	0	19 October 1946	Wales	12 November 1947	Wales
David Mitchell		5	0	29 March 1890	Ireland	7 April 1894	England
Lewis Morgan		7	0	30 May 2018	Peru	15 October 2024	Portugal
David Morris		6	1	3 March 1923	Ireland	4 April 1925	England
Tommy Muirhead		8	0	4 March 1922	Ireland	26 October 1929	Wales
Frank Munro		9	0	18 May 1971	Northern Ireland	1 June 1975	Romania
Iain Munro		7	0	2 June 1979	Argentina	24 May 1980	England
Ian Murray		6	0	15 October 2002	Canada	13 May 2006	Japan
Jimmy Murray		5	1	19 April 1958	England	15 June 1958	France
Graeme Murty		4	0	18 February 2004	Wales	17 October 2007	Georgia
Charlie Napier		5	3	9 April 1932	England	9 May 1937	Austria
Robert W. Neill		5	0	25 March 1876	Wales	13 March 1880	England
James Nelson		4	0	14 February 1925	Wales	18 May 1930	France
Frank O'Donnell		6	2	17 April 1937	England	21 May 1938	Netherlands
Brian O'Neil		7	0	27 March 1996	Australia	17 August 2005	Austria
Willie Ormond		6	2	3 April 1954	England	11 April 1959	England
Liam Palmer		8	0	21 March 2019	Kazakhstan	31 March 2021	Faroe Islands
Michael Paton		5	0	10 March 1883	England	27 March 1886	England
Andy Penman		4	0	11 May 1966	Netherlands	13 June 1967	Canada Olympic team
Willie Pettigrew		5	2	7 April 1976	Switzerland	27 April 1977	Sweden
David Provan		5	0	12 October 1963	Northern Ireland	11 May 1966	Netherlands
Pat Quinn (Note: The Scottish Football Association archive credits the third Scotland goal in the 9–3 match to Davie Wilson, and footage from the match (Footage #1 – 2:05 and Footage #2 – 1:29) appears to confirm this; most sources (and the contemporary commentary on the footage) credit the goal to Pat Quinn.)		4	0	15 April 1961	England	2 May 1962	Uruguay
Alex Raisbeck		8	0	7 April 1900	England	6 April 1907	England
Willie Redpath		9	0	23 October 1948	Wales	5 April 1952	England
Willie Reid		9	4	6 March 1911	Wales	4 April 1914	England
Paul Ritchie		7	1	28 April 1999	Germany	18 February 2004	Wales
Davie Robb		5	0	21 April 1971	Portugal	14 June 1971	Soviet Union
Archie Robertson		5	2	4 May 1955	Portugal	11 June 1958	Paraguay
George Robertson		4	0	5 March 1910	Wales	5 April 1913	England
Thomas Robertson (Note: The Scottish FA website merges the statistics of Tommy Robertson (born 1876) and Thomas Robertson (born 1864) into a single profile.)		4	0	9 March 1889	Ireland	19 March 1892	Ireland
Bobby Robinson		4	0	27 March 1974	West Germany	1 June 1975	Romania
Davie Russell		6	1	30 March 1895	Ireland	2 March 1901	Wales
Jimmy Scoular		9	0	12 May 1951	Denmark	5 November 1952	Northern Ireland
William Sellar		9	4	21 March 1885	England	1 April 1893	England
Bill Shankly		5	0	9 April 1938	England	15 April 1939	England
Jimmy Sharp		5	0	12 March 1904	Wales	1 March 1909	Wales
Davie Shaw		9	0	15 May 1946	Switzerland	17 November 1948	Ireland
Jock Shaw		6	0	23 January 1946	Belgium	4 October 1947	Ireland
Bobby Shearer		4	0	15 April 1961	England	14 May 1961	Czechoslovakia
Duncan Shearer		7	2	20 April 1994	Austria	16 August 1995	Greece
Graeme Shinnie		6	0	30 May 2018	Peru	21 March 2019	Kazakhstan
Donald Sillars		5	0	28 March 1891	Ireland	23 March 1895	Wales
Neil Simpson		5	0	24 May 1983	Northern Ireland	21 May 1988	England
Ronnie Simpson		5	0	15 April 1967	England	6 November 1968	Austria
Bob Smellie		6	0	19 February 1887	Ireland	1 April 1893	England
Jimmy Smith		4	0	30 May 1968	Netherlands	14 May 1974	Wales
Peter Somers		4	0	18 March 1905	Ireland	1 March 1909	Wales
George Stewart		4	0	3 March 1906	Wales	6 April 1907	England
Michael Stewart		4	0	17 April 2002	Nigeria	20 August 2008	Northern Ireland
Ross Stewart*		4	0	8 June 2022	Armenia	19 June 2026	Morocco
Robbie Stockdale		5	0	17 April 2002	Nigeria	21 August 2002	Denmark
Jack Taylor		4	1	26 March 1892	Wales	30 March 1895	Ireland
Joseph Taylor		6	0	30 November 1872	England	25 March 1876	Wales
Billy Thomson		7	0	16 May 1980	Northern Ireland	16 November 1983	East Germany
John Thomson (Note: The Scottish FA website merges the statistics of John Thomson and Jock Thomson into a single profile.)		4	0	18 May 1930	France	28 March 1931	England
William Thomson (Note: The Scottish FA website merges the statistics of William Thomson (Dumbarton FC player) and William Thomson (Dundee FC player) into a single profile.)		4	1	26 March 1892	Wales	26 March 1898	Ireland
Willie Thornton		8	1	15 May 1946	Switzerland	30 May 1952	Sweden
Jim Townsend		4	1	28 May 1967	Australia	13 June 1967	Canada Olympic team
Alex Troup		5	0	10 April 1920	England	17 April 1926	England
David Turnbull		5	0	2 June 2021	Netherlands	14 June 2022	Armenia
Eddie Turnbull		9	0	28 April 1948	Belgium	15 June 1958	France
Robbie Ure*		4	0	26 September 2026	Slovenia	6 October 2026	Slovenia
Tom Vallance		7	0	3 March 1877	England	14 March 1881	Wales
Tom Waddell		6	1	28 March 1891	Ireland	6 April 1895	England
George Walker		4	0	18 May 1930	France	24 May 1931	Switzerland
Jock Walker (Note: The Scottish FA website merges the statistics of John Walker and Jock Walker into a single profile.)		9	0	6 March 1911	Wales	5 April 1913	England
John Walker		5	3	30 March 1895	Ireland	26 March 1904	Ireland
Willie Wallace		7	0	25 November 1964	Northern Ireland	10 May 1969	England
Jimmy Watson (Note: The Scottish FA profile attributes an appearance by Jimmy Watson (born 1924) on 4 October 1947 to Jimmy Watson (born 1877).)		6	0	9 March 1903	Wales	3 April 1909	England
Frank Watt		4	3	9 March 1889	Ireland	4 April 1891	England
Andy Weir		6	1	6 May 1959	West Germany	8 June 1960	Turkey
Jerry Weir		4	2	30 November 1872	England	23 March 1878	Wales
Peter Weir		6	0	16 May 1980	Northern Ireland	13 December 1983	Northern Ireland
Stephen Welsh*		4	0	26 September 2026	Slovenia	6 October 2026	Slovenia
Gareth Williams		5	0	17 April 2002	Nigeria	20 November 2002	Portugal
Andrew Wilson (Note: The Scottish FA profile omits a goal scored by Andrew Wilson on 4 April 1908.)		6	1	6 April 1907	England	14 March 1914	Ireland
Danny Wilson		5	1	16 November 2010	Faroe Islands	3 September 2011	Czech Republic
George Wilson		6	0	12 March 1904	Wales	3 April 1909	England
Hughie Wilson		4	1	22 March 1890	Wales	26 March 1904	Ireland
Ian Wilson		5	0	23 May 1987	England	2 December 1987	Luxembourg
James Wilson		4	0	10 March 1888	Wales	4 April 1891	England
Peter Wilson		4	0	27 February 1926	Ireland	1 April 1933	England
George Wood		4	0	22 May 1979	Northern Ireland	28 April 1982	Northern Ireland
Alex Young		8	5	9 April 1960	England	18 June 1966	Portugal

== See also ==
- List of Scotland international footballers with one cap
- List of Scotland international footballers (2–3 caps)
- List of Scotland international footballers (10+ caps)
- Scotland national football team roll of honour (50+ caps)
