= List of Scotland international footballers (2–3 caps) =

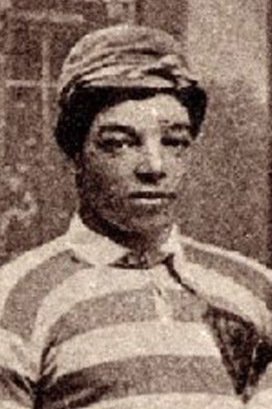
Andrew Watson made three appearances for Scotland in the early 1880s and was the first black person to play international football.

The Scotland national football team is the joint-oldest international football team, having played in the first official international match, a goalless draw on 30 November 1872 against England. Since then, the team has established a long-standing rivalry with England, particularly in the annual British Home Championship, which Scotland won 24 times outright and shared a further 17 times. The team has enjoyed less success in continental and global competition. Although Scotland has participated in eight FIFA World Cup and three UEFA European Championship final tournaments, the team has never progressed beyond the first round of any major tournament.

Kenny Dalglish and Andy Robertson are the only men to have won more than 100 caps for Scotland, and Dalglish was the only Scottish player named in the FIFA 100. Denis Law, who shares with Dalglish the record for the most goals scored for the national team, is the only Scottish player to have won the European Footballer of the Year award. The Scottish Football Association maintains a roll of honour for players who have won at least 50 caps. This distinction was launched in March 1998, when 11 players had already achieved that mark.

This list includes all Scotland players who have made between 2 and 3 appearances for the national team.

== List of players ==
Key

*	Still active for the national team

As of Scotland v North Macedonia, 13 November 2026

Scotland national football team players with 2 to 3 caps
Player	Refs.	Caps	Goals	Debut		Last or most recent match	
Player	Refs.	Caps	Goals	Date	Opponent	Date	Opponent
James Adams		3	0	9 March 1889	Ireland	25 March 1893	Ireland
William Agnew		3	0	16 March 1907	Ireland	14 March 1908	Ireland
Ralph Aitken		2	1	27 March 1886	England	24 March 1888	Ireland
David Alexander		2	1	24 March 1894	Wales	31 March 1894	Ireland
Neil Alexander (Note: The Scottish FA profile for Neil Alexander omits an appearance against Switzerland on 1 March 2006.)		3	0	1 March 2006	Switzerland	13 May 2006	Japan
David Allan		3	2	21 March 1885	England	10 April 1886	Wales
James Allan		2	2	19 March 1887	England	21 March 1887	Wales
Thomson Allan		2	0	27 March 1974	West Germany	6 June 1974	Norway
Bobby Ancell		2	0	31 October 1936	Ireland	2 December 1936	Wales
Kenneth Anderson		3	0	28 March 1896	Ireland	2 April 1898	England
Matt Armstrong		3	0	5 October 1935	Wales	14 October 1936	Germany
Bertie Auld		3	0	27 May 1959	Netherlands	4 November 1959	Wales
John Auld		3	0	19 March 1887	England	15 April 1889	Wales
Andrew Baird		2	0	19 March 1892	Ireland	24 March 1894	Wales
Davie Baird		3	1	29 March 1890	Ireland	26 March 1892	Wales
John Campbell Baird		3	2	4 March 1876	England	13 March 1880	England
John Barker		2	4	18 March 1893	Wales	24 March 1894	Wales
Frank Barrett		2	0	31 March 1894	Ireland	23 March 1895	Wales
Barney Battles, Sr.		3	0	23 February 1901	Ireland	30 March 1901	England
Willie Bauld		3	2	15 April 1950	England	21 May 1950	Portugal
Bobby Baxter		3	0	9 November 1938	Wales	15 April 1939	England
Willie Bell		2	0	18 June 1966	Portugal	25 June 1966	Brazil
Bob Bennie		3	0	14 February 1925	Wales	27 February 1926	Ireland
Paul Bernard		2	0	21 May 1995	Japan	24 May 1995	Ecuador
Davidson Berry		3	2	24 March 1894	Wales	25 March 1899	Ireland
William Beveridge		3	1	5 April 1879	England	27 March 1880	Wales
Luis Binks*		3	0	29 September 2026	Switzerland	6 October 2026	Slovenia
Andy Black		3	3	8 December 1937	Czechoslovakia	7 December 1938	Hungary
Eric Black		2	0	9 September 1987	Hungary	2 December 1987	Luxembourg
Adam Blacklaw		3	0	4 June 1963	Norway	7 December 1965	Italy
Jim Blyth		2	0	22 February 1978	Bulgaria	17 May 1978	Wales
Jimmy Bone		2	1	29 June 1972	Yugoslavia	18 October 1972	Denmark
James Bowie		2	0	13 March 1920	Ireland	10 April 1920	England
Billy Boyd		2	1	20 May 1931	Italy	24 May 1931	Switzerland
Bob Boyd		2	2	9 March 1889	Ireland	21 March 1891	Wales
George Boyd		2	0	26 March 2013	Serbia	28 May 2014	Nigeria
Liam Bridcutt		2	0	26 March 2013	Serbia	29 March 2016	Denmark
Andrew Brown		2	0	22 March 1890	Wales	21 March 1891	Wales
Hugh Brown		3	0	19 October 1946	Wales	24 May 1947	Luxembourg
Robert Brown (Note: The Scottish FA website attributes appearances by Bob Brown (born 1870) and Robert Brown (born 1860) to Robert Brown (born 1856).)		2	0	26 January 1884	Ireland	29 March 1884	Wales
Craig Bryson		3	0	16 November 2010	Faroe Islands	29 May 2016	Italy
John Buchanan		2	0	13 April 1929	England	5 April 1930	England
Paddy Buckley		3	1	5 May 1954	Norway	3 November 1954	Northern Ireland
Albert Buick		2	2	1 March 1902	Ireland	15 March 1902	Wales
Chris Cadden		2	0	30 May 2018	Peru	3 June 2018	Mexico
Tom Cairney		2	0	22 March 2017	Canada	23 March 2018	Costa Rica
Robert Calderwood		3	3	14 March 1885	Ireland	23 March 1885	Wales
Jock Cameron		2	0	26 March 1904	Ireland	3 April 1909	England
James Campbell		2	0	28 March 1891	Ireland	26 March 1892	Wales
Peter Campbell (Note: The Scottish FA website merges the statistics of Peter Campbell (Morton FC, active in the 1890s) and Peter Campbell (Rangers FC, active in the 1870s) into a single profile.)		2	3	23 March 1878	Wales	7 April 1879	Wales
Jimmy Carabine		3	0	21 May 1938	Netherlands	15 April 1939	England
Alex Christie		3	1	19 March 1898	Wales	8 April 1899	England
David Clarkson		2	1	30 May 2008	Czech Republic	19 November 2008	Argentina
William Clunas		2	1	12 April 1924	England	31 October 1925	Wales
John Colquhoun		2	0	17 February 1988	Saudi Arabia	22 March 1988	Malta
Bobby Combe		3	1	10 April 1948	England	17 May 1948	Switzerland
Alfie Conn, Jr.		2	0	20 May 1975	Northern Ireland	24 May 1975	England
Eddie Connachan		2	0	29 November 1961	Czechoslovakia	2 May 1962	Uruguay
George Connelly		2	0	26 September 1961	Czechoslovakia	14 November 1973	West Germany
Andrew Considine		3	0	11 October 2020	Slovakia	15 November 2020	Slovakia
Willie Cook		3	0	14 April 1934	England	21 November 1934	Wales
James Cowan		3	0	4 April 1896	England	2 April 1898	England
Allan Craig		3	0	26 May 1929	Norway	9 April 1932	England
David Crawford		3	0	24 March 1894	Wales	3 February 1900	Wales
Jimmy Croal		3	0	15 March 1913	Ireland	4 April 1914	England
Alex Cropley		2	0	13 October 1971	Portugal	10 November 1971	Belgium
Johnny Crosbie		2	0	26 February 1920	Wales	8 April 1922	England
Johnny Crum		2	0	4 April 1936	England	8 October 1938	Ireland
Jason Cummings		2	0	9 November 2017	Netherlands	27 March 2018	Hungary
Dixie Deans		2	0	30 October 1974	East Germany	20 November 1974	Spain
Mikey Devlin		3	0	10 October 2019	Russia	16 November 2019	Cyprus
Nicky Devlin		2	0	15 October 2024	Portugal	18 November 2024	Poland
Geordie Dewar		2	1	24 March 1888	Ireland	13 April 1889	England
Neil Dewar		3	4	9 April 1932	England	26 October 1932	Wales
Matthew Dickie		3	0	27 March 1897	Ireland	3 February 1900	Wales
Paul Dixon		3	0	8 September 2012	Serbia	14 November 2012	Luxembourg
Davie Dodds		2	1	21 September 1983	Uruguay	13 December 1983	Northern Ireland
Joe Dodds		3	0	28 February 1914	Wales	4 April 1914	England
Josh Doig*		2	0	9 June 2025	Liechtenstein	29 September 2026	Switzerland
Joe Donnachie		3	1	5 April 1913	England	4 April 1914	England
Davie Duncan		3	1	28 April 1948	Belgium	23 May 1948	France
James Duncan		2	0	23 March 1878	Wales	25 March 1882	Wales
Jimmy Dykes		2	0	21 May 1938	Netherlands	8 October 1938	Ireland
Jimmy Easson		3	1	16 May 1931	Austria	4 October 1933	Wales
Tommy Ewing		2	0	13 November 1957	Wales	19 April 1958	England
Derek Ferguson		2	0	22 March 1988	Malta	17 May 1988	Colombia
Bobby Flavell		2	2	18 May 1947	Belgium	24 May 1947	Luxembourg
Jimmy Fleming		3	3	1 June 1929	Germany	5 April 1930	England
Tyler Fletcher*		2	0	30 May 2026	Curaçao	6 June 2026	Bolivia
Donald Ford		3	0	17 October 1973	Czechoslovakia	14 May 1974	Wales
Robert Foyers		2	0	18 March 1893	Wales	24 March 1894	Wales
Willie Fraser		2	0	16 October 1954	Wales	3 November 1954	Northern Ireland
Dougie Freedman		2	1	6 October 2001	Latvia	27 March 2002	France
Jimmy Gabriel		2	0	22 October 1960	Wales	7 November 1963	Norway
Jimmy Galt		2	1	7 March 1908	Wales	14 March 1908	Ireland
Tommy Gemmell		2	1	4 May 1955	Portugal	15 May 1955	Yugoslavia
Matt Gilks		3	0	15 August 2012	Australia	10 September 2013	North Macedonia
Archie Glen		2	0	8 October 1955	Northern Ireland	14 April 1956	England
Robert Glen		3	0	23 March 1895	Wales	3 March 1900	Ireland
David Goodwillie		3	1	16 November 2010	Faroe Islands	11 October 2011	Spain
Jonathan Gould		2	0	9 October 1999	Lithuania	15 November 2000	Australia
Luke Graham*		2	0	3 October 2026	North Macedonia	13 November 2026	North Macedonia
John Grant		2	0	18 October 1958	Wales	5 November 1958	Northern Ireland
Peter Grant		2	0	27 May 1989	England	30 May 1989	Chile
Andy Gray		2	0	2 April 2003	Lithuania	27 May 2003	New Zealand
Willie Groves		3	4	10 March 1888	Wales	5 April 1890	England
Frank Haffey		2	0	9 April 1960	England	15 April 1961	England
James Hamilton (Note: The Scottish FA website merges the statistics of James Hamilton (born 1901) and James Hamilton (active in the 1890s) into a single profile.)		3	3	26 March 1892	Wales	1 April 1893	England
John Hansen		2	0	10 November 1971	Belgium	29 June 1972	Yugoslavia
Joe Harris		2	0	12 February 1921	Wales	26 February 1921	Ireland
William Harrower		3	4	11 March 1882	England	10 April 1886	Wales
Alex Hastings		2	0	13 November 1935	Ireland	10 November 1937	Ireland
David Hill (Note: The Scottish FA website merges the statistics of David Hill (born 1881) and David Hill (active in the 1880s) into a single profile.)		3	1	12 March 1881	England	25 March 1882	Wales
Frank Hill		3	0	18 May 1930	France	21 February 1931	Ireland
John Hill		2	0	4 April 1891	England	26 March 1892	Wales
George Hogg		2	0	28 March 1896	Ireland	4 April 1896	England
Andrew Holm		3	0	25 March 1882	Wales	12 March 1883	Wales
Harry Hood		3	0	16 May 1967	Israel	13 June 1967	Canada Olympic team
Billy Houliston		3	2	17 November 1948	Ireland	27 April 1949	France
Robert Howe		2	0	26 May 1929	Norway	4 June 1929	Netherlands
James Howie		3	2	1 April 1905	England	4 April 1908	England
Willie Hunter		3	1	5 June 1960	Hungary	22 October 1960	Wales
Jackie Husband		2	0	15 May 1946	Switzerland	19 October 1946	Wales
Tommy Hyslop		2	1	4 April 1896	England	3 April 1897	England
Willie Imrie		2	1	26 May 1929	Norway	1 June 1929	Germany
John Inglis (Note: The Scottish FA website merges the statistics of John Inglis (a goalkeeper, born 1857) and John Inglis (a forward, born 1859) into a single profile.)		2	0	10 March 1883	England	12 March 1883	Wales
Andrew Jackson		2	0	10 April 1886	Wales	24 March 1888	Ireland
Drew Jarvie		3	0	21 April 1971	Portugal	22 May 1971	England
John Johnston		3	0	26 October 1929	Wales	26 October 1932	Wales
Leslie Johnston		2	1	28 April 1948	Belgium	17 May 1948	Switzerland
William Johnstone		3	1	19 February 1887	Ireland	5 April 1890	England
John Kelly		2	0	23 October 1948	Wales	17 November 1948	Ireland
Liam Kelly*		3	0	17 October 2023	France	30 May 2026	Curaçao
Garry Kenneth		2	0	11 August 2010	Sweden	16 November 2010	Faroe Islands
William Ker		2	0	30 November 1872	England	8 March 1873	England
Andy Kerr		2	0	19 May 1955	Austria	29 May 1955	Hungary
Brian Kerr		3	0	27 May 2003	New Zealand	30 May 2004	Trinidad and Tobago
James King		2	1	17 September 1932	Ireland	16 September 1933	Ireland
Stephen Kingsley		2	0	4 June 2016	France	27 September 2022	Ukraine
John Lambie (Note: Some sources attribute a cap and goal in 1886 to Lambie, who had to withdraw from the team at short notice but was still included in match reports – his replacement, who scored, was James Kelly.)		2	0	19 February 1887	Ireland	17 March 1888	England
Jimmy Lang		2	2	25 March 1876	Wales	23 March 1878	Wales
Alex Latta		2	2	10 March 1888	Wales	13 April 1889	England
George Law		3	0	5 March 1910	Wales	2 April 1910	England
Tommy Law		2	0	31 March 1928	England	5 April 1930	England
Tommy Lawrence		3	0	9 June 1963	Republic of Ireland	3 May 1969	Wales
Willie Lennie		2	1	7 March 1908	Wales	14 March 1908	Ireland
Danny Liddle		3	0	16 May 1931	Austria	24 May 1931	Switzerland
John Lindsay		3	0	17 March 1888	England	1 April 1893	England
George Livingstone		2	0	7 April 1906	England	4 March 1907	Wales
Willie Loney		2	0	5 March 1910	Wales	19 March 1910	Ireland
Andy Love		3	1	16 May 1931	Austria	24 May 1931	Switzerland
Willie MacFadyen		2	2	4 October 1933	Wales	29 November 1933	Austria
Gary Mackay-Steven		2	0	15 November 2013	United States	14 October 2018	Portugal
Jake Madden		2	5	18 March 1893	Wales	23 March 1895	Wales
Chris Maguire		2	0	9 February 2011	Northern Ireland	29 May 2011	Republic of Ireland
Willie Maley		2	0	25 March 1893	Ireland	1 April 1893	England
Harry Marshall		2	1	18 March 1899	Wales	3 March 1900	Ireland
James Marshall		3	0	9 April 1932	England	14 April 1934	England
Robert Marshall		2	0	19 March 1892	Ireland	31 March 1894	Ireland
Brian Martin		2	0	21 May 1995	Japan	24 May 1995	Ecuador
Neil Martin		3	0	23 May 1965	Poland	9 November 1965	Italy
Brian McAllister		3	0	27 May 1997	Wales	8 June 1997	Belarus
Daniel McArthur		3	0	30 March 1895	Ireland	18 March 1899	Wales
Bob McAuley (Note: The Scottish FA profile attributes an appearance by Bob McAuley on 31 October 1931 to James McAulay.)		2	0	19 September 1931	Ireland	31 October 1931	Wales
Neil McBain		3	0	8 April 1922	England	16 February 1924	Wales
Joe McBride		2	0	22 October 1966	Wales	16 November 1966	Northern Ireland
Allan McClory		3	0	30 October 1926	Wales	21 November 1934	Wales
Philip McCloy		2	0	12 April 1924	England	4 April 1925	England
David McCrae		2	0	26 May 1929	Norway	1 June 1929	Germany
Andrew McCreadie		2	0	18 March 1893	Wales	7 April 1894	England
Ross McCrorie*		2	0	3 June 2024	Gibraltar	31 March 2026	Ivory Coast
Joe McDonald		2	0	8 October 1955	Northern Ireland	9 November 1955	Wales
Jimmy McDougall		2	0	16 May 1931	Austria	20 May 1931	Italy
Jay McEveley		3	0	22 August 2007	South Africa	26 March 2008	Croatia
Ernie McGarr		2	0	21 September 1969	Republic of Ireland	5 November 1969	Austria
Dylan McGeouch		2	0	30 May 2018	Peru	3 June 2018	Mexico
William McGuire		2	0	12 March 1881	England	14 March 1881	Wales
Tommy McInally		2	0	27 February 1926	Ireland	30 October 1926	Wales
Derek McInnes		2	0	21 August 2002	Denmark	20 November 2002	Portugal
Andrew McIntyre		2	0	2 March 1878	England	11 March 1882	England
Thomas McKeown		2	0	9 March 1889	Ireland	5 April 1890	England
Donald McKinlay		2	0	4 February 1922	Wales	4 March 1922	Ireland
Rob McKinnon		3	0	17 November 1993	Malta	7 June 1995	Faroe Islands
James McLaren		3	1	10 March 1888	Wales	5 April 1890	England
Jon McLaughlin		2	0	3 June 2018	Mexico	13 October 2019	San Marino
Duncan McLean		2	0	21 March 1896	Wales	27 March 1897	Ireland
Alex McLintock		3	0	6 March 1875	England	13 March 1880	England
Alex McNab		2	0	26 February 1921	Ireland	9 April 1921	England
Sandy McNab		2	0	9 May 1937	Austria	15 April 1939	England
Moses McNeil		2	0	25 March 1876	Wales	13 March 1880	England
Marc McNulty		2	0	21 March 2019	Kazakhstan	24 March 2019	San Marino
John McPherson (Note: The Scottish FA website attributes both appearances by John McPherson (born 1863) to John McPherson (born 1868).)		2	0	29 March 1890	Ireland	4 April 1891	England
Matt McQueen		2	0	22 March 1890	Wales	21 March 1891	Wales
Alex McSpadyen		2	0	7 December 1938	Hungary	15 April 1939	England
Gary McSwegan (Note: The Scottish FA profile for Gary McSwegan omits an appearance against Bosnia & Herzegovina on 5 October 1999.)		2	1	5 October 1999	Bosnia and Herzegovina	9 October 1999	Lithuania
George McWattie		2	0	23 February 1901	Ireland	2 March 1901	Wales
Bob Mercer		2	0	2 March 1912	Wales	15 March 1913	Ireland
Jimmy Millar		3	2	3 April 1897	England	2 April 1898	England
Jimmy Millar		2	0	8 May 1963	Austria	9 June 1963	Republic of Ireland
Lee Miller		3	0	13 May 2006	Japan	10 October 2009	Japan
Peter Miller		3	0	11 March 1882	England	12 March 1883	Wales
Tom Miller		3	2	10 April 1920	England	9 April 1921	England
Willie Mills		3	0	5 October 1935	Wales	2 December 1936	Wales
Jackie Milne		2	0	9 April 1938	England	15 April 1939	England
Bobby Mitchell		2	1	12 May 1951	Denmark	16 May 1951	France
James Mitchell		3	0	14 March 1908	Ireland	19 March 1910	Ireland
Neil Mochan		3	0	19 May 1954	Norway	19 June 1954	Uruguay
Hugh Morgan		2	0	19 March 1898	Wales	8 April 1899	England
Hugh Morton		2	0	1 June 1929	Germany	4 June 1929	Netherlands
George Mulhall		3	1	3 October 1959	Northern Ireland	12 October 1963	Northern Ireland
Alex Munro		3	1	31 October 1936	Ireland	21 May 1938	Netherlands
Neil Munro		2	2	10 March 1888	Wales	13 April 1889	England
Jamie Murphy		2	0	23 March 2018	Costa Rica	30 May 2018	Peru
Pat Murray		2	0	28 March 1896	Ireland	20 March 1897	Wales
Robert Neil		2	2	21 March 1896	Wales	3 February 1900	Wales
Peter Nellies		2	0	15 March 1913	Ireland	28 February 1914	Wales
Barry Nicholson		3	0	25 April 2001	Poland	17 November 2004	Sweden
Jimmy Nisbet		3	2	26 May 1929	Norway	4 June 1929	Netherlands
Ronald Orr (Note: The Scottish FA attributes two of Willie Orr's appearances to Ronald Orr.)		2	1	3 May 1902	England	9 April 1904	England
Tommy Orr		2	1	6 October 1951	Northern Ireland	14 November 1951	Wales
Willie Orr		3	0	3 March 1900	Ireland	12 March 1904	Wales
Jimmy Oswald		3	1	13 April 1889	England	20 March 1897	Wales
Robert Parlane		3	0	23 March 1878	Wales	7 April 1879	Wales
George Paterson		2	0	8 October 1938	Ireland	23 January 1946	Belgium
James Paterson		3	0	16 May 1931	Austria	24 May 1931	Switzerland
Andy Paton		3	0	23 January 1946	Belgium	30 May 1952	Sweden
Robert Paton		2	0	5 April 1879	England	7 April 1879	Wales
John Patrick		2	0	20 March 1897	Wales	3 April 1897	England
Harry Paul		3	2	1 March 1909	Wales	3 April 1909	England
Willie Paul (Note: The Scottish FA website merges the statistics of Willie Paul and William Paul into a single profile.)		3	5	10 March 1888	Wales	22 March 1890	Wales
Tommy Pearson		2	0	12 April 1947	England	18 May 1947	Belgium
James Phillips		3	0	3 March 1877	England	23 March 1878	Wales
John Rae		2	0	15 April 1889	Wales	29 March 1890	Ireland
Bobby Rankin		3	2	26 May 1929	Norway	4 June 1929	Netherlands
Gilbert Rankin (Note: Most sources credit a goal in the Ireland v Scotland fixture of 1890 to John McPherson, but contemporary reports credit this to Gilbert Rankin (who scored two other goals in the match).)		2	3	29 March 1890	Ireland	4 April 1891	England
Bobby Reid		2	0	10 November 1937	Ireland	9 April 1938	England
James Reid		3	0	28 February 1914	Wales	1 March 1924	Ireland
James Richmond		3	1	3 March 1877	England	25 March 1882	Wales
Derek Riordan		3	0	17 August 2005	Austria	14 November 2009	Wales
Harry Ritchie		2	0	17 March 1923	Wales	25 February 1928	Ireland
William Robb		2	0	31 October 1925	Wales	29 October 1927	Wales
David Robertson		3	0	19 February 1992	Northern Ireland	23 March 1994	Netherlands
Jimmy Robertson		2	0	16 May 1931	Austria	20 May 1931	Italy
Scott Robertson		2	0	19 November 2008	Argentina	11 August 2010	Sweden
William Robertson		2	1	19 March 1887	England	21 March 1887	Wales
Archie Rowan		2	0	13 March 1880	England	25 March 1882	Wales
Willie Russell		2	0	16 February 1924	Wales	4 April 1925	England
Jocky Scott		2	0	9 June 1971	Denmark	14 June 1971	Soviet Union
Frank Shaw		2	1	15 March 1884	England	29 March 1884	Wales
Jimmy Simpson (Note: The Scottish FA website merges the statistics of Jimmy Simpson (born 1908) and Jimmy Connor (born 1873) into a single profile.)		3	0	23 March 1895	Wales	6 April 1895	England
George Sinclair		3	0	19 March 1910	Ireland	16 March 1912	Ireland
Dave Smith		2	0	11 May 1966	Netherlands	30 May 1968	Netherlands
Eric Smith		2	0	27 May 1959	Netherlands	3 June 1959	Portugal
Henry Smith		3	0	17 February 1988	Saudi Arabia	20 May 1992	Canada
Jamie Smith		2	0	12 February 2003	Republic of Ireland	30 April 2003	Austria
Jimmy Smith		2	1	20 October 1934	Ireland	10 November 1937	Ireland
Robert Smith		2	0	30 November 1872	England	8 March 1873	England
Tom Smith		2	0	14 April 1934	England	9 April 1938	England
William Somers		3	0	5 April 1879	England	27 March 1880	Wales
Finlay Speedie		3	2	9 March 1903	Wales	4 April 1903	England
James Stark		2	0	15 March 1909	Ireland	3 April 1909	England
David Steele		3	0	3 March 1923	Ireland	14 April 1923	England
Jimmy Stephen		2	0	19 October 1946	Wales	12 November 1947	Wales
Allan Stewart		2	1	24 March 1888	Ireland	15 April 1889	Wales
David Stewart		3	0	18 March 1893	Wales	27 March 1897	Ireland
Jim Stewart		2	0	15 June 1977	Chile	25 October 1978	Norway
William Stewart		2	1	26 March 1898	Ireland	3 March 1900	Ireland
David Storrier		3	0	18 March 1899	Wales	8 April 1899	England
Willie Telfer		2	0	17 September 1932	Ireland	16 September 1933	Ireland
Alec Thomson		3	0	17 April 1926	England	26 October 1932	Wales
Andrew Thomson		2	0	20 March 1886	Ireland	15 April 1889	Wales
Harry Thomson		2	0	16 May 1967	Israel	28 May 1967	Australia
James J. Thomson		3	0	30 November 1872	England	7 March 1874	England
Kevin Thomson		3	0	20 August 2008	Northern Ireland	11 August 2010	Sweden
Sammy Thomson		2	0	26 January 1884	Ireland	29 March 1884	Wales
Hugh Tinney		2	0	3 June 1967	Australia	13 June 1967	Canada Olympic team
Willie Toner		2	0	18 October 1958	Wales	5 November 1958	Northern Ireland
Willie Turner		2	1	14 March 1885	Ireland	20 March 1886	Ireland
Alex Venters		2	1	16 September 1933	Ireland	15 April 1939	England
Andy Walker		3	0	17 May 1988	Colombia	12 October 1994	Faroe Islands
Nicky Walker		2	0	24 March 1993	Germany	26 May 1996	United States
William Walker		2	0	15 March 1909	Ireland	19 March 1910	Ireland
Ian Wallace		3	1	22 February 1978	Bulgaria	19 May 1979	Wales
Jimmy Wardhaugh		2	0	8 December 1954	Hungary	7 November 1956	Northern Ireland
Andrew Watson		3	0	12 March 1881	England	11 March 1882	England
Jimmy Watson (Note: The Scottish FA profile attributes an appearance by Jimmy Watson (born 1924) on 4 October 1947 to Jimmy Watson (born 1877).)		2	0	4 October 1947	Ireland	3 October 1953	Northern Ireland
Jock White (Note: The Scottish FA website merges the statistics of John White and Jock White into a single profile.)		2	0	4 February 1922	Wales	3 March 1923	Ireland
Walter White		2	0	6 April 1907	England	4 April 1908	England
Andrew Whitelaw		2	0	19 February 1887	Ireland	22 March 1890	Wales
Bob Wilson		2	0	13 October 1971	Portugal	1 December 1971	Netherlands
James Wilson*		2	0	23 March 2025	Greece	30 May 2026	Curaçao
Willie Wiseman		2	0	30 October 1926	Wales	22 February 1930	Ireland
David Wotherspoon		2	0	30 November 1872	England	8 March 1873	England
Stephen Wright		2	0	24 March 1993	Germany	19 May 1993	Estonia
Tommy Wright		3	0	18 October 1952	Wales	18 April 1953	England
Ron Yeats		2	0	3 October 1964	Wales	7 December 1965	Italy
Alex Young		2	0	1 April 1905	England	4 March 1907	Wales

== See also ==
- List of Scotland international footballers with one cap
- List of Scotland international footballers (4–9 caps)
- List of Scotland international footballers (10+ caps)
- Scotland national football team roll of honour (50+ caps)
