= List of Scotland international footballers =

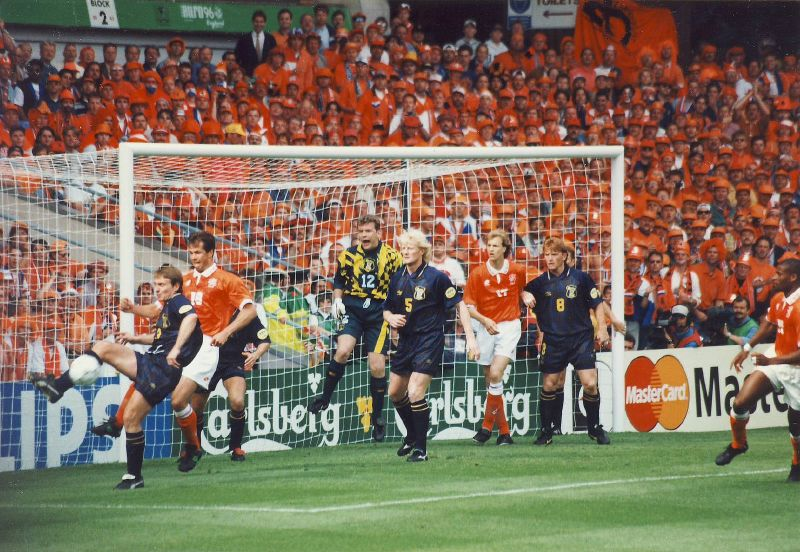
Scotland (in blue) in action against The Netherlands at UEFA Euro 1996

The Scotland national football team is the joint-oldest international football team, having played in the first official international match, a goalless draw on 30 November 1872 against England. Since then, the team has established a long-standing rivalry with England, particularly in the annual British Home Championship, which Scotland won 24 times outright and shared a further 17 times. The team has enjoyed less success in continental and global competition. Even though Scotland has participated in eight FIFA World Cup and three UEFA European Championship final tournaments, the team has never progressed beyond the first round of any major tournament.

Andy Robertson and Kenny Dalglish are the only men to have won more than 100 caps for Scotland, and Dalglish was the only Scottish player named in the FIFA 100. Denis Law, who shares with Dalglish the record for the most goals scored for the national team, is the only Scottish player to have won the European Footballer of the Year award.

This list includes all players with 10 or more appearances for the national team. When a player makes their 25th appearance, they are presented with a commemorative medal. The Scottish Football Association also maintains a roll of honour for players who have won at least 50 caps. This distinction was launched in March 1998, when 11 players had already achieved that mark.

== List of players ==
Key

*	Still active for the national team

As of Switzerland v Scotland, 16 November 2026

Scotland national football team players with 10 or more caps
Player	Refs.	Caps	Goals	Debut		Last or most recent match	
Player	Refs.	Caps	Goals	Date	Opponent	Date	Opponent
Charlie Adam		26	0	30 May 2007	Austria	5 June 2015	Qatar
Ché Adams*		51	13	25 March 2021	Austria	13 November 2026	North Macedonia
Andy Aitken		14	0	30 March 1901	England	1 April 1911	England
Roy Aitken		57	1	12 September 1979	Peru	16 October 1991	Romania
Arthur Albiston		14	0	28 April 1982	Northern Ireland	13 June 1986	Uruguay
Graham Alexander		40	0	17 April 2002	Nigeria	5 September 2009	Macedonia
Andrew Anderson		23	0	1 April 1933	England	7 December 1938	Hungary
Russell Anderson		11	0	12 October 2002	Iceland	26 March 2008	Croatia
Ikechi Anya		29	3	6 September 2013	Belgium	8 October 2017	Slovenia
Steve Archibald		27	4	26 March 1980	Portugal	8 June 1986	West Germany
Stuart Armstrong		53	5	26 March 2017	Slovenia	18 November 2024	Poland
Walter Arnott		14	0	12 March 1883	Wales	1 April 1893	England
Barry Bannan		27	0	16 November 2010	Faroe Islands	8 October 2017	Slovenia
Eamonn Bannon		11	1	19 December 1979	Belgium	8 June 1986	West Germany
Phil Bardsley		13	0	12 October 2010	Spain	5 March 2014	Poland
Jim Baxter		34	3	9 November 1960	Northern Ireland	22 November 1967	Wales
Jack Bell		10	5	29 March 1890	Ireland	7 April 1900	England
Alex Bennett		11	2	12 March 1904	Wales	15 March 1913	Ireland
Christophe Berra		41	4	30 May 2008	Czech Republic	9 November 2017	Netherlands
Jim Bett		26	1	23 March 1982	Netherlands	11 June 1990	Costa Rica
Scott Booth		22	6	24 March 1993	Germany	6 October 2001	Latvia
Kris Boyd		18	7	11 May 2006	Bulgaria	7 September 2010	Liechtenstein
Tom Boyd		72	1	12 September 1990	Romania	5 September 2001	Belgium
Alan Brazil		13	1	28 May 1980	Poland	1 June 1983	England
Billy Bremner		54	3	8 May 1965	Spain	3 September 1975	Denmark
Allan Brown		14	6	26 April 1950	Switzerland	19 June 1954	Uruguay
Bill Brown		28	0	15 June 1958	France	9 November 1965	Italy
George Brown		19	0	25 October 1930	Wales	21 May 1938	Netherlands
Scott Brown		55	4	12 November 2005	United States	4 September 2017	Malta
Jimmy Brownlie		16	0	15 March 1909	Ireland	4 April 1914	England
Martin Buchan		34	0	13 October 1971	Portugal	29 November 1978	Portugal
Oliver Burke		13	1	29 March 2016	Denmark	18 November 2020	Israel
Craig Burley		46	3	21 May 1995	Japan	30 April 2003	Austria
George Burley		11	0	19 May 1979	Wales	29 May 1982	England
Kenny Burns		20	1	27 March 1974	West Germany	16 May 1981	Wales
Colin Calderwood		36	1	29 March 1995	Russia	5 October 1999	Bosnia and Herzegovina
Eric Caldow		40	4	6 April 1957	England	6 April 1963	England
Gary Caldwell		55	2	27 March 2002	France	26 March 2013	Serbia
Steven Caldwell		12	0	25 April 2001	Poland	9 February 2011	Northern Ireland
Colin Cameron		28	2	28 April 1999	Germany	13 October 2004	Moldova
Charles Campbell		13	1	7 March 1874	England	27 March 1886	England
John Campbell (Note: The Scottish FA website merges the statistics of John Campbell (born 1872) and John Campbell (active in the 1880s) into a single profile.)		12	4	25 March 1893	Ireland	9 March 1903	Wales
Ryan Christie*		76	11	9 November 2017	Netherlands	16 November 2026	Switzerland
Bobby Clark		17	0	22 November 1967	Wales	14 February 1973	England
Bobby Collins		31	10	21 October 1950	Wales	23 May 1965	Poland
John Collins		58	12	17 February 1988	Saudi Arabia	17 November 1999	England
Eddie Colquhoun		11	0	16 May 1967	Israel	14 February 1973	England
Kris Commons		12	2	20 August 2008	Northern Ireland	6 February 2013	Estonia
Charlie Cooke		16	0	24 November 1965	Wales	13 May 1975	Portugal
Davie Cooper		22	6	12 September 1979	Peru	16 May 1990	Egypt
Liam Cooper		19	0	6 September 2019	Russia	3 June 2024	Gibraltar
Jimmy Cowan		25	0	28 April 1948	Belgium	30 May 1952	Sweden
Don Cowie		10	0	10 October 2009	Japan	26 May 2012	United States
Doug Cowie		20	0	18 April 1953	England	11 June 1958	Paraguay
Sammy Cox		25	0	23 May 1948	France	3 April 1954	England
Stephen Crainey		12	0	27 March 2002	France	11 November 2011	Cyprus
Stevie Crawford		25	4	24 May 1995	Ecuador	17 November 2004	Sweden
Paddy Crerand		16	0	3 May 1961	Republic of Ireland	13 October 1965	Poland
Andy Cunningham		12	5	13 March 1920	Ireland	2 April 1927	England
Christian Dailly		67	6	27 May 1997	Wales	30 May 2008	Czech Republic
Kenny Dalglish		102	30	10 November 1971	Belgium	12 November 1986	Luxembourg
Callum Davidson		19	0	5 September 1998	Lithuania	5 September 2009	Macedonia
Jerry Dawson		14	0	20 October 1934	Ireland	15 April 1939	England
Jimmy Delaney		15	6	5 October 1935	Wales	10 April 1948	England
Paul Devlin		10	0	15 October 2002	Canada	6 September 2003	Faroe Islands
Paul Dickov		10	1	7 October 2000	San Marino	9 October 2004	Norway
Tommy Docherty		25	1	14 November 1951	Wales	11 April 1959	England
Billy Dodds		26	7	5 October 1996	Latvia	5 September 2001	Belgium
Willie Donachie		35	0	26 April 1972	Peru	29 November 1978	Portugal
Simon Donnelly		10	0	27 May 1997	Wales	14 October 1998	Faroe Islands
Graham Dorrans		12	0	10 October 2009	Japan	11 October 2015	Gibraltar
Rab Douglas		19	0	17 April 2002	Nigeria	17 August 2005	Austria
Jock Drummond		14	0	19 March 1892	Ireland	21 March 1903	Ireland
Dally Duncan		14	7	26 October 1932	Wales	30 October 1937	Wales
Gordon Durie		43	7	11 November 1987	Bulgaria	23 June 1998	Morocco
Ian Durrant		20	0	9 September 1987	Hungary	30 May 2000	Republic of Ireland
Lyndon Dykes*		53	10	4 September 2020	Israel	19 June 2026	Morocco
Matt Elliott		18	1	12 November 1997	France	6 October 2001	Latvia
Bobby Evans		48	0	23 October 1948	Wales	8 June 1960	Turkey
George Farm		10	0	18 October 1952	Wales	3 June 1959	Portugal
Barry Ferguson		45	3	5 September 1998	Lithuania	28 March 2009	Netherlands
Lewis Ferguson*		33	1	1 September 2021	Denmark	16 November 2026	Switzerland
Willie Fernie		12	1	25 May 1954	Finland	11 June 1958	Paraguay
Darren Fletcher		80	5	20 August 2003	Norway	8 October 2017	Slovenia
Steven Fletcher		33	10	26 March 2008	Croatia	20 November 2018	Israel
Alex Forbes		14	0	12 April 1947	England	30 May 1952	Sweden
James Forrest		39	5	29 May 2011	Republic of Ireland	3 June 2024	Gibraltar
Alex Forsyth		10	0	29 June 1972	Yugoslavia	3 September 1975	Denmark
Tom Forsyth		22	0	9 June 1971	Denmark	11 June 1978	Netherlands
Ryan Fraser		26	4	10 June 2017	England	16 November 2022	Turkey
Hughie Gallacher (Note: There is some uncertainty over the sixth Scotland goal in a 7–3 win over Ireland in 1929: both Hughie Gallacher, who had already scored four times, and Alex James went for the ball at the same point. Correspondence between Queen of the South FC and the Scottish Football Museum in 2016 favoured Gallacher, stating "Hughie himself was insistent that the goal was his, claiming that as he and Alex James (who was a good friend of his) were of a similar build (and of course in 1929 there were no numbers on the jerseys), it was easy for pressmen to make a mistake". James remains credited with the goal in some sources, including the Scottish Football Association website profiles, while the Scottish Football Hall of Fame include the contradictory statement that Gallacher's total was 23 goals but that he scored a record five in a match against Ireland.)		20	24	1 March 1924	Ireland	6 April 1935	England
Kevin Gallacher		53	9	17 May 1988	Colombia	28 March 2001	San Marino
Ben Gannon-Doak*		23	1	5 September 2024	Poland	16 November 2026	Switzerland
Tommy Gemmell		18	1	2 April 1966	England	3 February 1971	Belgium
Archie Gemmill		43	8	3 February 1971	Belgium	25 March 1981	Northern Ireland
Scot Gemmill		26	1	21 May 1995	Japan	30 April 2003	Austria
Neilly Gibson		14	1	30 March 1895	Ireland	18 March 1905	Ireland
Gary Gillespie		13	0	14 October 1987	Belgium	14 November 1990	Bulgaria
Billy Gilmour*		52	2	2 June 2021	Netherlands	13 November 2026	Switzerland
Alan Gilzean		22	12	7 November 1963	Norway	21 April 1971	Portugal
Andy Goram		43	0	16 October 1985	East Germany	25 March 1998	Denmark
Craig Gordon		84	0	30 May 2004	Trinidad and Tobago	30 May 2026	Curaçao
Jimmy Gordon		10	0	16 March 1912	Ireland	10 April 1920	England
Richard Gough		61	6	30 March 1983	Switzerland	28 April 1993	Portugal
Arthur Graham		11	2	7 September 1977	East Germany	16 May 1981	Wales
George Graham		12	3	13 October 1971	Portugal	30 June 1973	Brazil
Andy Gray		20	7	17 December 1975	Romania	28 May 1985	Iceland
Dougie Gray		10	0	27 October 1928	Wales	26 October 1932	Wales
Eddie Gray		12	3	10 May 1969	England	17 November 1976	Wales
Frank Gray		32	1	7 April 1976	Switzerland	16 June 1983	Canada
Gordon Greer		11	0	15 November 2013	United States	4 June 2016	France
John Greig		44	3	11 April 1964	England	29 October 1975	Denmark
Leigh Griffiths		22	4	14 November 2012	Luxembourg	18 November 2020	Israel
Angus Gunn*		31	0	25 March 2023	Cyprus	16 November 2026	Switzerland
Alex Hamilton		24	0	8 November 1961	Wales	13 October 1965	Poland
Robert Hamilton		11	15	18 March 1899	Wales	6 March 1911	Wales
Grant Hanley*		70	2	25 May 2011	Wales	19 June 2026	Morocco
Alan Hansen		26	0	19 May 1979	Wales	18 February 1987	Republic of Ireland
Jack Harkness		12	0	26 February 1927	Ireland	4 October 1933	Wales
Bill Harper		11	0	3 March 1923	Ireland	17 April 1926	England
Asa Hartford		50	5	26 April 1972	Peru	18 June 1982	Brazil
Paul Hartley		25	1	26 March 2005	Italy	3 March 2010	Czech Republic
David Harvey		16	0	15 November 1972	Denmark	8 September 1976	Finland
David Hay		27	0	18 April 1970	Northern Ireland	22 June 1974	Yugoslavia
Jimmy Hay		11	0	18 March 1905	Ireland	4 April 1914	England
Willie Henderson		29	5	20 October 1962	Wales	21 April 1971	Portugal
Colin Hendry		51	3	19 May 1993	Estonia	28 March 2001	San Marino
Jack Hendry*		44	3	27 March 2018	Hungary	6 October 2026	Slovenia
John Hewie		19	2	14 April 1956	England	4 May 1960	Poland
Aaron Hickey*		27	0	24 March 2022	Poland	16 November 2026	Switzerland
George Hirst*		10	1	20 March 2025	Greece	6 June 2026	Bolivia
Gary Holt		10	1	2 September 2000	Latvia	13 October 2004	Moldova
Jim Holton		15	2	12 May 1973	Wales	30 October 1974	East Germany
Don Hutchison		26	6	31 March 1999	Czech Republic	15 November 2003	Netherlands
Tommy Hutchison		17	1	26 September 1973	Czechoslovakia	3 September 1975	Denmark
Alan Hutton		50	0	30 May 2007	Austria	24 March 2016	Czech Republic
Jock Hutton		10	1	3 March 1923	Ireland	25 February 1928	Ireland
Ryan Jack		20	0	9 November 2017	Netherlands	7 June 2024	Finland
Alex Jackson		17	8	14 February 1925	Wales	18 May 1930	France
Darren Jackson		28	4	29 March 1995	Russia	10 October 1998	Estonia
Sandy Jardine		38	1	11 November 1970	Denmark	19 December 1979	Belgium
Eoin Jess		18	2	18 November 1992	Italy	31 March 1999	Czech Republic
Allan Johnston		18	2	10 October 1998	Estonia	7 September 2002	Faroe Islands
Mo Johnston		38	14	28 February 1984	Wales	13 November 1991	San Marino
Willie Johnston		21	0	13 October 1965	Poland	3 June 1978	Peru
Bobby Johnstone		17	10	14 April 1951	England	14 April 1956	England
Derek Johnstone		14	2	12 May 1973	Wales	19 December 1979	Belgium
Jimmy Johnstone		23	4	3 October 1964	Wales	20 November 1974	Spain
Joe Jordan		52	11	19 May 1973	England	22 June 1982	Soviet Union
Kevin Kyle		10	1	16 May 2002	South Korea	14 November 2009	Wales
Paul Lambert		40	1	21 May 1995	Japan	10 September 2003	Germany
Denis Law		55	30	18 October 1958	Wales	14 June 1974	Zaire
Graham Leggat		18	8	14 April 1956	England	5 June 1960	Hungary
Jim Leighton		91	0	13 October 1982	East Germany	10 October 1998	Estonia
Bobby Lennox		10	3	16 November 1966	Northern Ireland	22 April 1970	Wales
Craig Levein		16	0	28 March 1990	Argentina	16 November 1994	Russia
Billy Liddell		29	8	15 May 1946	Switzerland	8 October 1955	Northern Ireland
Peter Lorimer		21	4	5 November 1969	Austria	17 December 1975	Romania
Lou Macari		24	5	24 May 1972	Wales	7 June 1978	Iran
Dave Mackay		22	4	26 May 1957	Spain	2 October 1965	Northern Ireland
Duncan MacKay		14	0	11 April 1959	England	2 May 1962	Uruguay
Murdo MacLeod		20	1	25 May 1985	England	6 February 1991	Soviet Union
Shaun Maloney		47	7	8 October 2005	Belarus	4 June 2016	France
Maurice Malpas		55	0	1 June 1984	France	18 November 1992	Italy
David Marshall		47	0	18 August 2004	Hungary	22 June 2021	Croatia
Chris Martin		17	3	28 May 2014	Nigeria	8 October 2017	Slovenia
Russell Martin		29	0	25 May 2011	Wales	26 March 2017	Slovenia
Alex Massie		18	1	19 September 1931	Ireland	30 October 1937	Wales
Don Masson		17	5	6 May 1976	Wales	3 June 1978	Peru
Gary McAllister		57	5	25 April 1990	East Germany	31 March 1999	Czech Republic
James McArthur		32	4	16 November 2010	Faroe Islands	8 October 2017	Slovenia
Oli McBurnie*		22	0	23 March 2018	Costa Rica	16 November 2026	Switzerland
Stuart McCall		40	1	28 March 1990	Argentina	25 March 1998	Denmark
Jim McCalliog		10	1	15 April 1967	England	21 April 1971	Portugal
Neil McCann		26	3	5 September 1998	Lithuania	12 November 2005	United States
Brian McClair		30	2	12 November 1986	Luxembourg	2 June 1993	Estonia
Ally McCoist		61	19	29 April 1986	Netherlands	10 October 1998	Estonia
Ian McColl		14	0	15 April 1950	England	19 April 1958	England
Robert Smyth McColl		13	13	21 March 1896	Wales	14 March 1908	Ireland
Ross McCormack		13	2	30 May 2008	Czech Republic	29 May 2016	Italy
Eddie McCreadie		23	0	10 April 1965	England	17 May 1969	Cyprus
Lee McCulloch		18	1	13 October 2004	Moldova	12 October 2010	Spain
James McFadden		48	15	20 May 2002	South Africa	7 September 2010	Liechtenstein
John McGinlay		13	4	20 April 1994	Austria	2 April 1997	Austria
John McGinn*		95	24	29 March 2016	Denmark	16 November 2026	Switzerland
Danny McGrain		62	0	12 May 1973	Wales	22 June 1982	Soviet Union
Allan McGregor		42	0	30 May 2007	Austria	20 November 2018	Israel
Callum McGregor		63	3	9 November 2017	Netherlands	23 June 2024	Hungary
Jim McInally		10	0	1 April 1987	Belgium	28 April 1993	Portugal
Scott McKenna*		54	1	23 March 2018	Costa Rica	3 October 2026	North Macedonia
Stewart McKimmie		40	1	27 May 1989	England	15 June 1996	England
Billy McKinlay		29	4	17 November 1993	Malta	14 October 1998	Faroe Islands
Tosh McKinlay		22	0	16 August 1995	Greece	23 June 1998	Morocco
Ronnie McKinnon		28	1	9 November 1965	Italy	14 June 1971	Soviet Union
Alan McLaren		24	0	17 May 1992	United States	15 November 1995	San Marino
Kenny McLean*		61	3	24 March 2016	Czech Republic	24 June 2026	Brazil
Alex McLeish		77	0	26 March 1980	Portugal	17 February 1993	Malta
Stephen McManus		26	2	11 October 2006	Ukraine	12 October 2010	Spain
Jimmy McMenemy		12	5	18 March 1905	Ireland	13 March 1920	Ireland
Jimmy McMullan		16	0	26 February 1920	Wales	13 April 1929	England
Alec McNair		15	0	3 March 1906	Wales	10 April 1920	England
Jackie McNamara		33	0	5 October 1996	Latvia	7 September 2005	Norway
Henry McNeil		10	6	7 March 1874	England	14 March 1881	Wales
Billy McNeill		29	3	15 April 1961	England	27 May 1972	England
Bob McPhail		17	7	2 April 1927	England	10 November 1937	Ireland
Dave McPherson		27	0	26 April 1989	Cyprus	28 April 1993	Portugal
Gordon McQueen		30	5	1 June 1974	Belgium	16 May 1981	Wales
Paul McStay		76	9	21 September 1983	Uruguay	2 April 1997	Austria
Willie McStay		13	0	12 February 1921	Wales	25 February 1928	Ireland
Scott McTominay*		75	15	23 March 2018	Costa Rica	16 November 2026	Switzerland
David Meiklejohn		15	3	4 February 1922	Wales	29 November 1933	Austria
Kenny Miller		69	18	25 April 2001	Poland	14 August 2013	England
Willie Miller		65	1	1 June 1975	Romania	15 November 1989	Norway
Bobby Moncur		16	0	30 May 1968	Netherlands	27 May 1972	England
Willie Morgan		26	4	16 May 1967	Israel	22 June 1974	Yugoslavia
James Morrison		46	3	30 May 2008	Czech Republic	5 October 2017	Slovakia
Alan Morton		31	5	26 February 1920	Wales	8 May 1932	France
Jackie Mudie		17	9	20 October 1956	Wales	15 June 1958	France
Charlie Mulgrew		44	3	29 February 2012	Slovenia	10 October 2019	Russia
Bobby Murdoch		12	6	9 November 1965	Italy	5 November 1969	Austria
Steven Naismith		51	10	6 June 2007	Faroe Islands	19 November 2019	Kazakhstan
David Narey		35	1	27 April 1977	Sweden	8 February 1989	Cyprus
Gary Naysmith		46	1	30 May 2000	Republic of Ireland	1 April 2009	Iceland
Pat Nevin		28	5	26 March 1986	Romania	27 March 1996	Australia
Joe Nibloe		11	0	13 April 1929	England	8 May 1932	France
Charlie Nicholas		20	5	30 March 1983	Switzerland	26 April 1989	Cyprus
Steve Nicol		27	0	12 September 1984	Yugoslavia	11 September 1991	Switzerland
Kevin Nisbet		11	1	31 March 2021	Faroe Islands	20 June 2023	Georgia
Garry O'Connor		16	4	17 April 2002	Nigeria	9 September 2009	Netherlands
Stephen O'Donnell		26	0	30 May 2018	Peru	29 March 2022	Austria
John O'Hare		13	5	18 April 1970	Northern Ireland	24 May 1972	Wales
Alex Parker		15	0	4 May 1955	Portugal	11 June 1958	Paraguay
Derek Parlane		12	1	12 May 1973	Wales	28 May 1977	Wales
Callum Paterson		17	0	29 May 2016	Italy	12 November 2020	Serbia
Nathan Patterson*		31	1	6 June 2021	Luxembourg	16 November 2026	Switzerland
Stephen Pearson		10	0	15 November 2003	Netherlands	17 October 2007	Georgia
Matt Phillips		16	1	26 May 2012	United States	9 September 2019	Belgium
Ryan Porteous*		15	1	27 September 2022	Ukraine	16 November 2026	Switzerland
Steven Pressley		32	0	29 March 2000	France	11 October 2006	Ukraine
David Provan		10	1	19 December 1979	Belgium	28 April 1982	Northern Ireland
Nigel Quashie		14	1	27 May 2004	Estonia	6 September 2006	Lithuania
Jimmy Quinn		11	7	18 March 1905	Ireland	23 March 1912	England
Gavin Rae		14	0	25 April 2001	Poland	1 April 2009	Iceland
Anthony Ralston*		29	1	15 November 2021	Denmark	24 June 2026	Brazil
Lawrie Reilly		38	22	23 October 1948	Wales	6 April 1957	England
Harry Rennie		13	0	3 March 1900	Ireland	14 March 1908	Ireland
Jordan Rhodes		14	3	11 November 2011	Cyprus	22 March 2017	Canada
Tommy Ring		12	2	6 May 1953	Sweden	6 November 1957	Switzerland
Bruce Rioch		24	6	13 May 1975	Portugal	11 June 1978	Netherlands
Matt Ritchie		16	3	25 March 2015	Northern Ireland	23 March 2018	Costa Rica
Andy Robertson*		103	4	5 March 2014	Poland	16 November 2026	Switzerland
John Robertson		16	3	12 September 1990	Romania	11 October 1995	Sweden
John Neilson Robertson		28	8	13 May 1978	Northern Ireland	12 October 1983	Belgium
John Tait Robertson		16	3	2 April 1898	England	6 March 1905	Wales
Barry Robson		17	0	22 August 2007	South Africa	29 February 2012	Slovenia
Maurice Ross		13	0	16 May 2002	South Korea	19 November 2003	Netherlands
Alan Rough		53	0	7 April 1976	Switzerland	23 April 1986	England
Johnny Russell		14	1	18 November 2014	England	13 October 2019	San Marino
Alex Scott		16	5	7 November 1956	Northern Ireland	25 June 1966	Brazil
Scott Severin		15	0	6 October 2001	Latvia	6 September 2006	Lithuania
Lawrence Shankland*		22	7	10 October 2019	Russia	24 June 2026	Brazil
Graeme Sharp		12	1	28 May 1985	Iceland	22 March 1988	Malta
Jimmy Simpson (Note: The Scottish FA website merges the statistics of Jimmy Simpson (born 1873) and Jimmy Connor (born 1908) into a single profile.)		14	1	20 October 1934	Ireland	10 November 1937	Ireland
Alex Smith		20	3	2 April 1898	England	1 April 1911	England
Gordon Smith		19	4	23 January 1946	Belgium	26 May 1957	Spain
John Smith		10	10	3 March 1877	England	15 March 1884	England
Nicol Smith		12	0	3 April 1897	England	3 May 1902	England
Robert Snodgrass		28	7	9 February 2011	Northern Ireland	10 October 2019	Russia
Graeme Souness		54	4	30 October 1974	East Germany	8 June 1986	West Germany
John Souttar* (Note: The Scottish FA website omits an appearance by John Souttar against France on 19 October 2023. UEFA report)		24	2	7 September 2018	Belgium	6 June 2026	Bolivia
David Speedie		10	0	25 May 1985	England	30 May 1989	Chile
John Spencer		14	0	16 November 1994	Russia	27 May 1997	Wales
Ian St. John		21	9	6 May 1959	West Germany	10 April 1965	England
Pat Stanton		16	0	11 May 1966	Netherlands	27 March 1974	West Germany
Billy Steel		30	12	12 April 1947	England	6 May 1953	Sweden
Colin Stein		21	9	16 October 1968	Denmark	19 May 1973	England
George Stevenson		12	4	29 October 1927	Wales	20 October 1934	Ireland
Ray Stewart		10	1	16 May 1981	Wales	18 February 1987	Republic of Ireland
Gordon Strachan		50	5	16 May 1980	Northern Ireland	25 March 1992	Finland
Paul Sturrock		20	3	16 May 1981	Wales	1 April 1987	Belgium
Neil Sullivan		28	0	27 May 1997	Wales	12 February 2003	Republic of Ireland
Greg Taylor		14	0	11 June 2019	Belgium	7 June 2024	Finland
Gary Teale		13	0	1 March 2006	Switzerland	1 April 2009	Iceland
Bobby Templeton		11	1	3 May 1902	England	3 March 1913	Wales
Steven Thompson		16	3	27 March 2002	France	13 October 2004	Moldova
Charles Bellany Thomson		21	4	26 March 1904	Ireland	4 April 1914	England
Kieran Tierney*		60	2	29 March 2016	Denmark	16 November 2026	Switzerland
Ian Ure		12	0	8 November 1961	Wales	21 October 1967	Northern Ireland
Willie Waddell		18	6	15 May 1946	Switzerland	3 November 1954	Northern Ireland
Bobby Walker		29	8	3 March 1900	Ireland	5 April 1913	England
Tommy Walker		21	9	21 November 1934	Wales	15 May 1946	Switzerland
Lee Wallace		10	0	10 October 2009	Japan	22 March 2017	Canada
John Wark		29	7	19 May 1979	Wales	12 September 1984	Yugoslavia
Andy Webster		28	1	30 April 2003	Austria	6 February 2013	Estonia
David Weir		69	1	27 May 1997	Wales	12 October 2010	Spain
John White (Note: The Scottish FA website merges the statistics of John White and Jock White into a single profile.)		22	3	6 May 1959	West Germany	12 May 1964	West Germany
Steven Whittaker		31	0	12 August 2009	Norway	29 March 2016	Denmark
Derek Whyte		12	0	14 October 1987	Belgium	28 April 1999	Germany
Lee Wilkie		11	1	16 May 2002	South Korea	19 November 2003	Netherlands
Andrew Wilson (Note: The Scottish FA profile omits a goal scored by Andrew Wilson on 10 April 1920.)		12	13	26 February 1920	Wales	14 April 1923	England
Davie Wilson (Note: The Scottish Football Association archive credits the 3rd Scotland goal in the 9–3 match to Davie Wilson, and footage from the match (Footage #1 – 2:05 and Footage #2 – 1:29) appears to confirm this; most sources (and the contemporary commentary on the footage) credit the goal to Pat Quinn)		22	9	22 October 1960	Wales	27 May 1965	Finland
Willie Woodburn		24	0	12 April 1947	England	30 April 1952	United States
George Young (Note: The Scottish FA profile omits a substitute appearance by George Young on 15 May 1946.)		54	0	15 May 1946	Switzerland	19 May 1957	Switzerland
Tommy Younger		24	0	4 May 1955	Portugal	11 June 1958	Paraguay

== See also ==
- List of Scotland international footballers with one cap
- List of Scotland international footballers (2–3 caps)
- List of Scotland international footballers (4–9 caps)
- Scotland Men's International Roll of Honour (50+ caps)
