= William McGuire =

William McGuire may refer to:

- William Anthony McGuire (1881–1940), American screenwriter and dramatist
- William Henry McGuire (1875–1957), Canadian senator
- William J. McGuire, American social psychologist
- William W. McGuire (contemporary, born 1948), American physician; former CEO of UnitedHealth Group
- Billy and Benny McGuire, "World's Heaviest Twins"
- William McGuire (footballer) (fl. 1881), Scottish international football player
- William McGuire (judge), one of the three first judges of the Mississippi Territory
- William T. "Bill" McGuire, a man murdered by his wife in 2004

== See also ==
- Bill McGuire (disambiguation)
