= Alexander Dick =

Alexander or Alec Dick may refer to:

- Alexander Dick (cricketer) (1922–2018), Australian cricketer
- Alexander Dick (politician) (1827–1867), Australian politician
- Alex Dick (1894–1958), Scottish footballer
- Alec Dick (footballer) (1865–1925), Scottish footballer
- Sir Alexander Dick, 3rd Baronet (1703–1785), Scottish landowner and physician
