= Progression of Scotland association football goalscoring record =

This is a progressive list of football players who have held or co-held the record for goals scored for the Scotland national football team. The list begins with Henry Renny-Tailyour and William Gibb, who both scored in the 4–2 defeat by England in March 1873. The first official international game, contested by the same teams in November 1872, had finished goalless. The record is shared by Denis Law and Kenny Dalglish, with 30 goals each.

== Criteria ==
For the early decades, records of players appearances and goals were often considered unreliable. RSSSF and IFFHS have spent much effort trying to produce definitive lists of full international matches, and corresponding data on players' international caps and goals. Using this data, the following records can be retrospectively produced. Note that, at the time, these records may not have been recognised.

== Record ==
Player	Goals	Date	Opponent	Score	Notes
Henry Renny-Tailyour	1	8 Mar 1873	England	2–4	
William Gibb	1	8 Mar 1873	England	2–4	
Angus MacKinnon	1	7 Mar 1874	England	2–1	
Frederick Anderson	1	7 Mar 1874	England	2–1	
Henry McNeil	1	6 Mar 1875	England	2–2	
Peter Andrews	1	6 Mar 1875	England	2–2	
Henry McNeil	2	4 Mar 1876	England	3–0	
Henry McNeil	3	25 Mar 1876	Wales	4–0	
John Ferguson	3	3 Mar 1877	England	3–1	Ferguson scored two goals in this match to equal McNeil.
Henry McNeil	5	2 Mar 1878	England	7–2	McNeil scored two goals in this match.
John Ferguson	5	23 Mar 1878	Wales	9–0	Ferguson scored two goals in this match to equal McNeil.
Billy MacKinnon	5	5 Apr 1879	England	4–5	MacKinnon scored two goals in this match to equal Ferguson and McNeil.
John Smith	6	12 Mar 1881	England	6–1	Smith scored a hat-trick in this match to overtake Ferguson, MacKinnon and McNeil.
George Ker	7	14 Mar 1881	Wales	5–1	Ker scored two goals in this match to overtake Smith.
George Ker	9	11 Mar 1882	England	5–1	Ker scored two goals in this match.
George Ker	10	25 Mar 1882	Wales	5–0	
John Smith	10	15 Mar 1884	England	1–0	Jointly with Ker.
Robert Smyth McColl	10	25 Mar 1899	Ireland	9–1	McColl scored a hat-trick in this match to equal Ker and Smith.
Robert Smyth McColl	13	7 Apr 1900	England	4–1	McColl scored a hat-trick in this match.
Robert Hamilton	13	26 Mar 1904	Ireland	1–1	Jointly with McColl.
Robert Hamilton	15	6 Mar 1911	Wales	2–2	Hamilton scored two goals in this match.
Hughie Gallacher	18	23 Feb 1929	Ireland	7–3	Gallacher scored five goals in this match to overtake Hamilton. (Note: Some sources credit Gallacher with scoring only four goals in the match including inconsistencies on the Scottish FA web pages.)
Hughie Gallacher	20	26 Oct 1929	Wales	4–2	Gallacher scored two goals in this match.
Hughie Gallacher	22	22 Feb 1930	Ireland	3–1	Gallacher scored two goals in this match.
Hughie Gallacher	24	18 May 1930	France	2–0	Gallacher scored two goals in this match.
Denis Law	24	23 May 1965	Poland	1–1	Jointly with Gallacher.
Denis Law	25	2 Apr 1966	England	3–4	
Denis Law	26	22 Oct 1966	Wales	1–1	
Denis Law	27	15 Apr 1967	England	3–2	
Denis Law	28	6 Nov 1968	Austria	2–1	
Denis Law	29	26 Apr 1972	Peru	2–0	
Denis Law	30	20 May 1972	Northern Ireland	2–0	
Kenny Dalglish	30	14 Nov 1984	Spain	3–1	Jointly with Law.

== See also ==
- Scotland national football team records
