= Alex Mackie =

Scottish footballer and manager

Personal information
- Date of birth: 1870
- Place of birth: Auchterless, Scotland
- Date of death: Unknown

Senior career*
Years	Team	Apps	(Gls)
1890–1891	Aberdeen		
1891–1892	Victoria United		
1892–1893	The Heatherley		
1893–1894	Inverness Thistle		
- Sunderland

Managerial career
- 1899–1905: Sunderland
- 1905–1906: Middlesbrough
- * Club domestic league appearances and goals

Alex Mackie (born in Banffshire in 1870) was a Scottish Association football player and manager who took charge of Sunderland and Middlesbrough.

Mackie played his early football in Aberdeen before joining the Glasgow Football Association. He then became club secretary at Inverness. After this, he spent seven seasons as player-manager of Sunderland during one of their most productive playing periods, winning the 1901–02 Football League championship, though his involvement in the Andy McCombie scandal brought a suspension imposed by the Football Association.

He was one of seventy applicants for the Middlesbrough job after Jack Robson departed and his record at Roker Park convinced the board that he was the man for the job, starting work in the summer of 1905. Following the football payments scandal at the end of 1905, he received a ban forbidding him from any active participation in football, unlike his predecessor who had the foresight to obtain a letter of absolution from the club chairman. However, Mackie was disillusioned with football by this point and so pre-empted the ban by voluntarily severing his interests.

He took over the Star and Garter Hotel in Marton Road, Middlesbrough in June 1906.

== See also ==
- List of English football championship-winning managers
