= List of Scotland national football team captains =

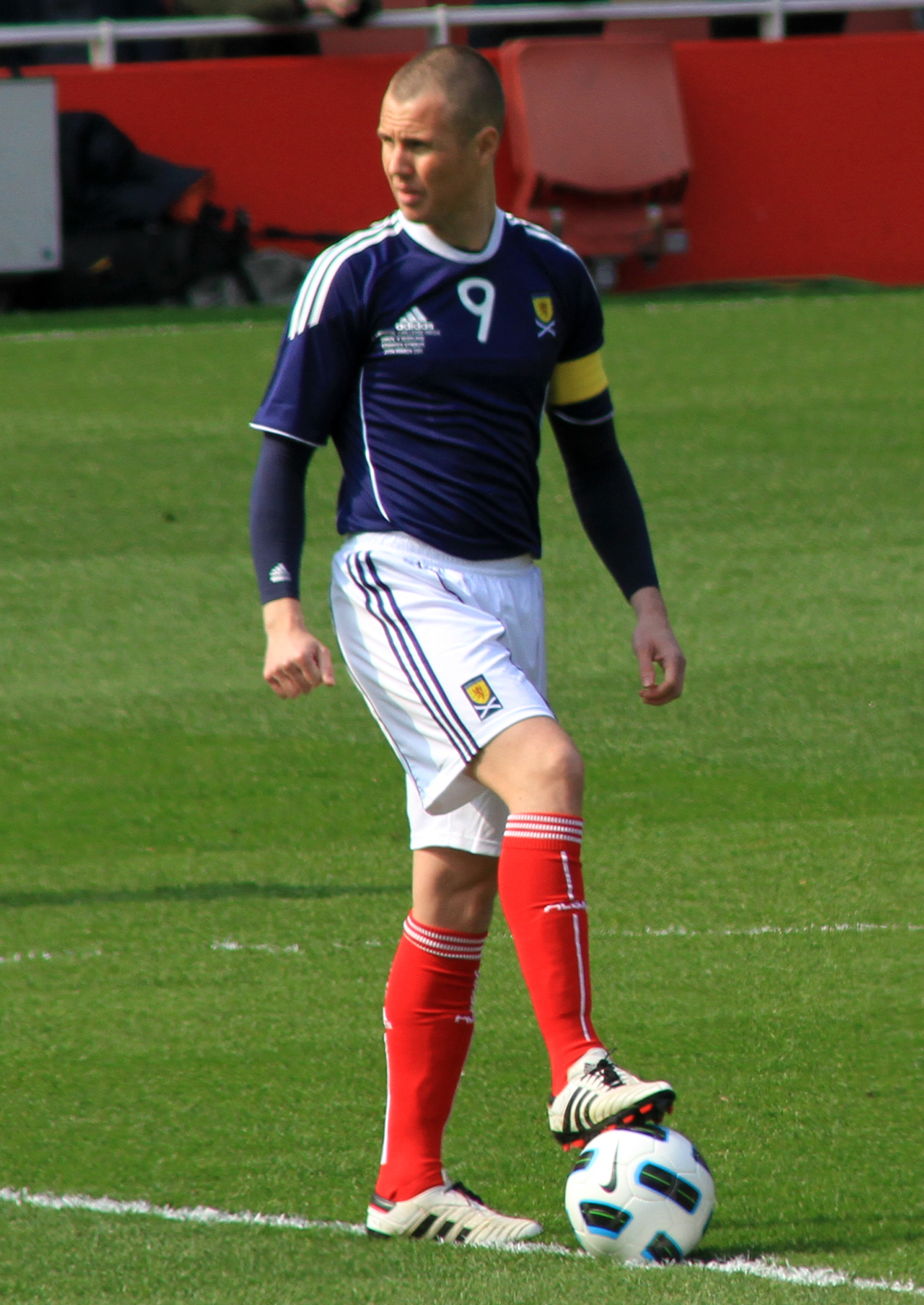
Kenny Miller, playing for Scotland in a friendly against Brazil in March 2011. The yellow armband signifies that Miller was team captain.

This article lists all the captains of the men's Scotland national football team. As of 16 November 2026, Scotland have played 862 officially recognised international matches and have had 157 different team captains. Andy Robertson has captained Scotland most often, in 81 games. Four other players (George Young, Billy Bremner, Darren Fletcher and Gary McAllister) have captained the team at least 30 times.

The first captain of the Scotland team was Robert Gardner, who led the team in the first ever international match, against England on 30 November 1872. He went on to captain Scotland on just one further occasion, the second international match, on 8 March 1873, against the same opposition.

== List of captains ==
Key

*	Still active for the national team
Caps as captain	Appearances made while captain
Total caps	Total number of appearances made

As of Switzerland v Scotland, 16 November 2026

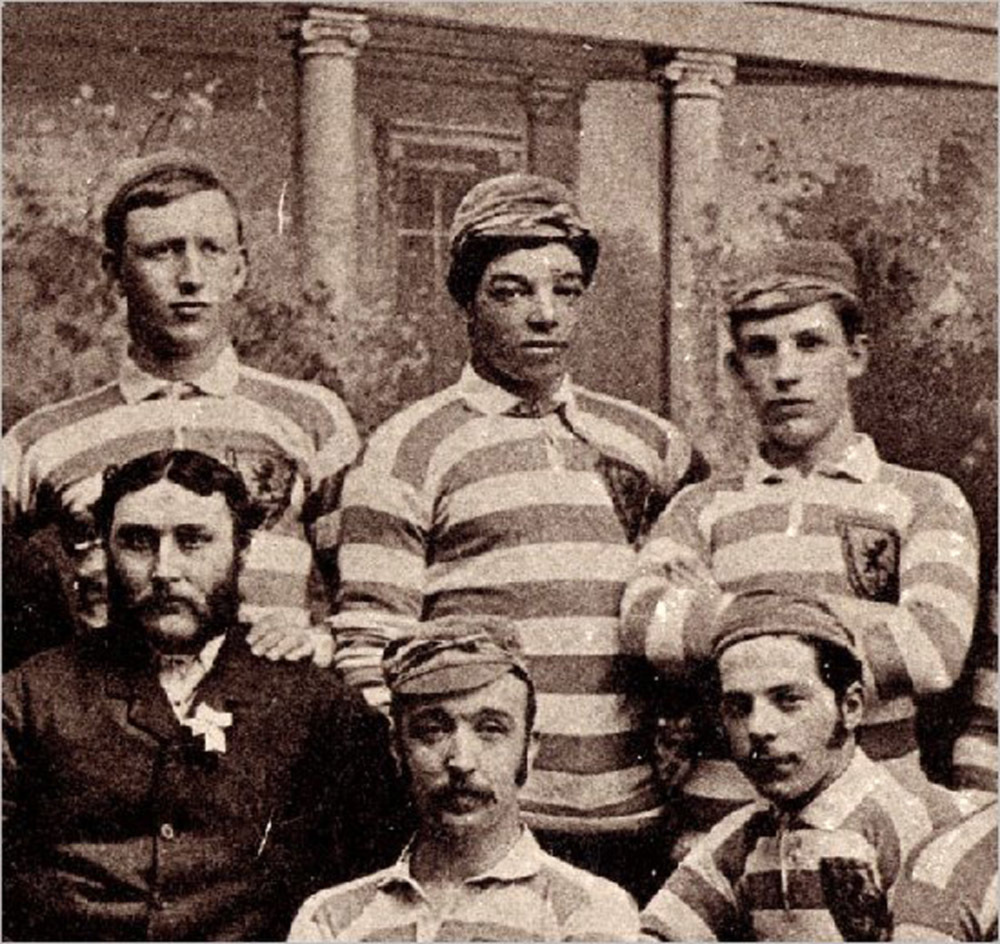
Andrew Watson (top centre) captained Scotland twice in his three appearances for the national team.

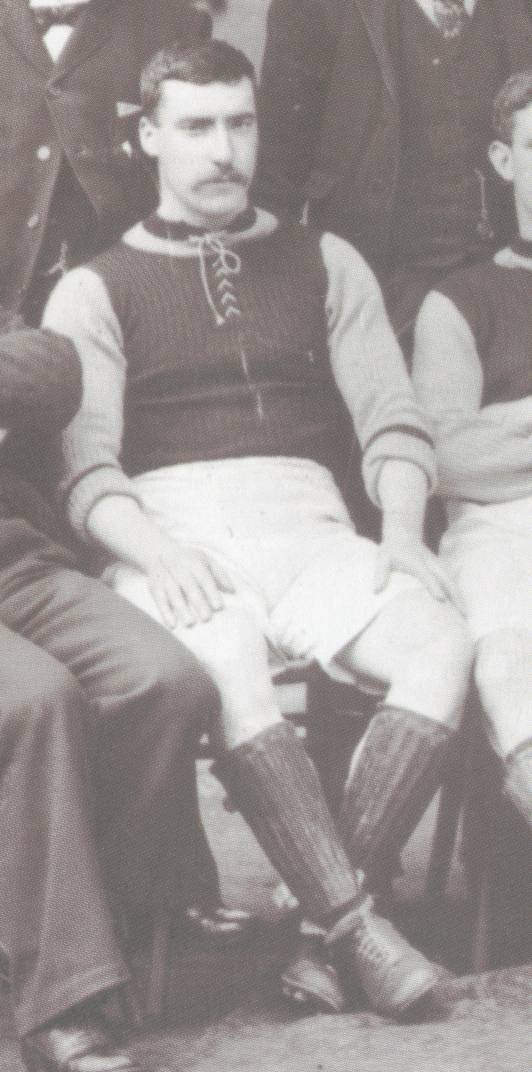
James Cowan captained Scotland just once, in April 1898. This was a common occurrence in his era, as Scotland only played three matches (in the British Home Championship) each season until 1928–29.

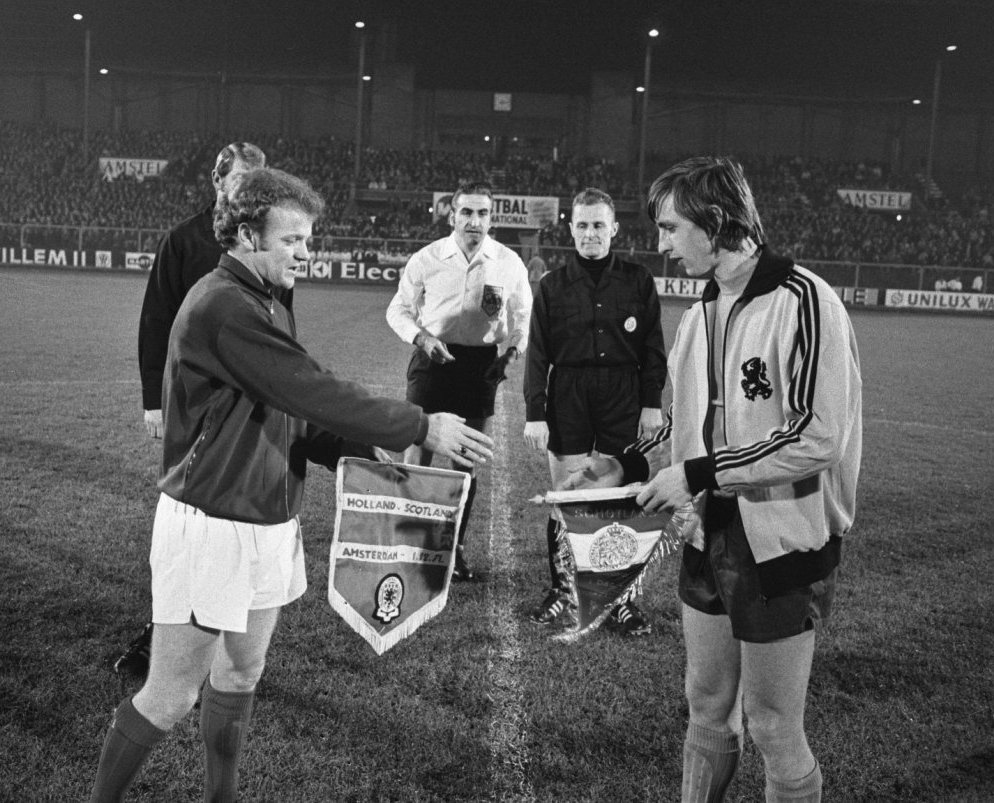
Scotland captain Billy Bremner (left) and Netherlands captain Johan Cruyff exchange pennants before an international match in 1971.

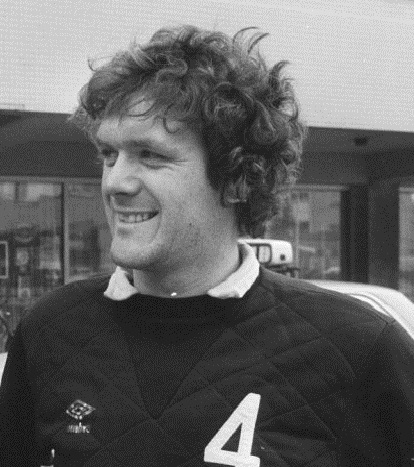
Roy Aitken captained Scotland 27 times, which included the 1990 FIFA World Cup campaign.

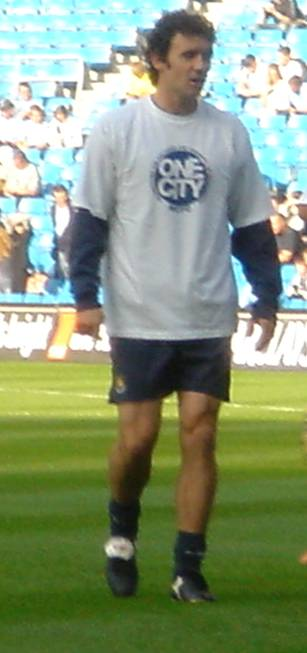
Christian Dailly captained Scotland in a match against the Hong Kong League XI on 20 May 2002. Although the match is included by the Scottish Football Association in its statistical totals, it was not recognised as a full international by FIFA.

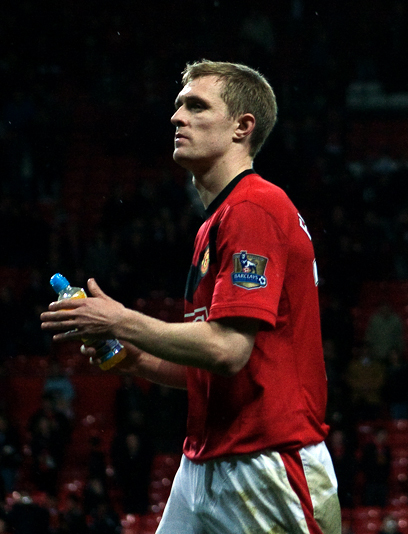
Darren Fletcher became the youngest player to captain Scotland in over a century when he first led the team, in a friendly against Estonia in May 2004.

Player	Scotland career	Caps as captain	Total caps	First captaincy	Last captaincy
Robert Gardner	1872–1878	2	5	30 November 1872	8 March 1873
James J. Thomson	1872–1874	1	3	7 March 1874	7 March 1874
Joseph Taylor	1872–1876	2	6	6 March 1875	4 March 1876
Charles Campbell	1874–1886	8	13	25 March 1876	21 March 1885
Robert W. Neill	1876–1880	2	5	23 March 1878	13 March 1880
John McDougall	1877–1879	1	5	7 April 1879	7 April 1879
David Davidson	1878–1881	1	5	27 March 1880	27 March 1880
Andrew Watson	1881–1882	2	3	12 March 1881	14 March 1881
Archie Rowan	1880–1882	1	2	25 March 1882	25 March 1882
Andrew Holm	1882–1883	2	3	10 March 1883	12 March 1883
Walter Arnott	1883–1893	3	14	26 January 1884	4 April 1891
Michael Paton	1883–1886	2	5	29 March 1884	23 March 1885
John McPherson	1879–1885	1	8	14 March 1885	14 March 1885
William Semple	1886	1	1	10 April 1886	10 April 1886
John Lambie	1887–1888	1	2	19 February 1887	19 February 1887
James McAulay	1882–1887	2	9	19 March 1887	21 March 1887
Bob Smellie	1887–1893	2	6	10 March 1888	13 April 1889
Donald Gow	1888	1	1	17 March 1888	17 March 1888
Duncan Stewart	1888	1	1	24 March 1888	24 March 1888
Thomas Robertson	1889–1892	3	4	9 March 1889	19 March 1892
Andrew Thomson	1889	1	2	15 April 1889	15 April 1889
George Gillespie	1880–1891	2	7	22 March 1890	28 March 1891
John McLeod	1888–1893	1	5	29 March 1890	29 March 1890
James McLaren	1888–1890	1	3	5 April 1890	5 April 1890
John Hill	1891–1892	1	2	26 March 1892	26 March 1892
William Sellar	1885–1893	1	9	2 April 1892	2 April 1892
Donald Sillars	1891–1895	2	5	18 March 1893	23 March 1895
James Kelly	1888–1896	4	8	25 March 1893	28 March 1896
Robert Marshall	1892–1894	1	2	31 March 1894	31 March 1894
Dan Doyle	1892–1898	1	8	7 April 1894	7 April 1894
Jock Drummond	1892–1903	4	14	30 March 1895	21 March 1903
Jimmy Oswald	1889–1897	1	3	6 April 1895	6 April 1895
John Gillespie	1896	1	1	21 March 1896	21 March 1896
John L. Ritchie	1897	1	1	20 March 1897	20 March 1897
William Lambie	1892–1897	1	9	3 April 1897	3 April 1897
Matthew Scott	1898	1	1	19 March 1898	19 March 1898
Bob Kelso	1885–1898	1	7	26 March 1898	26 March 1898
James Cowan	1896–1898	1	3	2 April 1898	2 April 1898
Nicol Smith	1897–1902	2	12	18 March 1899	8 April 1899
David Storrier	1899	1	3	25 March 1899	25 March 1899
Robert Hamilton	1899–1911	2	11	3 February 1900	23 February 1901
Henry Marshall	1899–1900	1	2	3 March 1900	3 March 1900
John Tait Robertson	1898–1905	5	16	7 April 1900	9 April 1904
Albert Buick	1902	1	2	1 March 1902	1 March 1902
John Campbell	1893–1903	1	12	15 March 1902	15 March 1902
Andy Aitken	1901–1911	2	14	3 May 1902	18 March 1911
Alex Raisbeck	1900–1907	4	8	9 March 1903	6 April 1907
Jimmy Sharp	1904–1909	1	5	12 March 1904	12 March 1904
Tom Jackson	1904–1907	1	6	6 March 1905	6 March 1905
Neilly Gibson	1895–1905	1	14	18 March 1905	18 March 1905
Charles Bellany Thomson	1904–1914	12	21	1 April 1905	5 April 1913
John May	1906–1909	1	5	17 March 1906	17 March 1906
James Stark	1909	2	2	15 March 1909	3 April 1909
Jimmy Hay	1905–1914	3	11	5 March 1910	1 April 1911
Peter McWilliam	1905–1911	1	8	6 March 1911	6 March 1911
Alec McNair	1906–1920	5	15	16 March 1912	10 April 1920
Donald Colman	1911–1913	1	4	15 March 1913	15 March 1913
Peter Nellies	1913–1914	1	2	28 February 1914	28 February 1914
Jimmy Gordon	1912–1920	1	10	4 April 1914	4 April 1914
William Cringan	1920–1923	3	5	26 February 1920	14 April 1923
Kenny Campbell	1920–1922	1	8	12 February 1921	12 February 1921
Andrew Wilson	1920–1923	1	12	26 February 1921	26 February 1921
Jack Marshall (Note: Jack Marshall also represented the United States.)	1921–1924	2	7	9 April 1921	4 February 1922
Andy Cunningham	1920–1927	1	12	4 March 1922	4 March 1922
Jimmy Blair	1920–1924	3	8	8 April 1922	16 February 1924
Jock Hutton	1923–1928	1	10	1 March 1924	1 March 1924
Jimmy McMullan	1920–1929	6	16	12 April 1924	13 April 1929
David Morris	1923–1925	3	6	14 February 1925	4 April 1925
Tom Townsley	1925	1	1	31 October 1925	31 October 1925
Willie McStay	1921–1928	5	13	27 February 1926	2 April 1927
Tommy Muirhead	1922–1929	1	8	25 February 1928	25 February 1928
Tully Craig	1927–1930	4	8	26 May 1929	26 October 1929
David Meiklejohn	1922–1933	6	15	22 February 1930	29 November 1933
Jimmy Crapnell	1929–1932	4	9	18 May 1930	17 September 1932
Robert Gillespie	1926–1933	3	4	25 October 1930	1 April 1933
Alan Morton	1920–1932	1	31	21 February 1931	21 February 1931
Danny Blair	1928–1932	1	8	16 May 1931	16 May 1931
Jimmy McDougall	1931	1	2	20 May 1931	20 May 1931
John Johnstone	1929–1932	1	3	26 October 1932	26 October 1932
Peter McGonagle	1933–1934	1	6	16 September 1933	16 September 1933
Andrew Anderson	1933–1938	4	23	4 October 1933	7 December 1938
Alex Massie	1931–1937	2	18	14 April 1934	20 October 1934
Jimmy Simpson	1934–1937	13	14	21 November 1934	10 November 1937
George Brown	1930–1938	2	19	9 April 1938	21 May 1938
Jimmy Carabine	1938–1939	1	3	8 October 1938	8 October 1938
Jimmy Dougal	1939	1	1	15 April 1939	15 April 1939
Jock Shaw	1946–1947	6	6	23 January 1946	4 October 1947
Jimmy Stephen	1946–1947	1	2	19 October 1946	19 October 1946
Davie Shaw	1946–1948	1	9	27 November 1946	27 November 1946
Willie Woodburn	1947–1952	1	24	12 November 1947	12 November 1947
George Young	1946–1957	48	54	10 April 1948	19 May 1957
Sammy Cox	1948–1954	1	25	3 April 1954	3 April 1954
Tommy Docherty	1951–1959	8	25	5 May 1954	19 April 1958
Willie Cunningham	1954–1955	5	8	25 May 1954	2 April 1955
Gordon Smith	1946–1957	2	19	19 May 1955	29 May 1955
Tommy Younger	1955–1958	4	24	7 May 1958	11 June 1958
Bobby Evans	1948–1960	12	48	15 June 1958	8 June 1960
Dave Mackay	1957–1965	7	22	18 October 1958	20 November 1963
Eric Caldow	1957–1963	15	40	22 October 1960	6 April 1963
Denis Law	1958–1974	5	55	9 June 1963	26 April 1972
Billy McNeill	1961–1972	8	29	11 April 1964	13 October 1965
Jim Baxter	1960–1967	4	34	25 November 1964	10 May 1967
John Greig	1964–1975	15	44	7 December 1965	29 October 1975
Ian Ure	1961–1967	1	12	16 May 1967	16 May 1967
Doug Fraser	1967–1968	4	7	28 May 1967	13 June 1967
Billy Bremner	1965–1975	39	54	16 October 1968	3 September 1975
Frank McLintock	1963–1971	1	9	18 April 1970	18 April 1970
Bobby Moncur	1968–1972	7	16	11 November 1970	9 June 1971
Pat Stanton	1966–1974	3	16	14 June 1971	16 May 1973
David Hay	1970–1974	2	27	17 October 1973	27 March 1974
Sandy Jardine	1970–1979	9	38	30 October 1974	19 December 1979
Gordon McQueen	1974–1981	1	30	1 June 1975	1 June 1975
Martin Buchan	1971–1978	2	34	17 December 1975	18 June 1977
Tom Forsyth	1971–1978	1	22	7 April 1976	7 April 1976
Archie Gemmill	1971–1981	23	43	6 May 1976	25 March 1981
Kenny Dalglish	1971–1986	6	102	27 April 1977	26 March 1986
Bruce Rioch	1975–1978	10	24	28 May 1977	11 June 1978
Don Masson	1976–1978	2	17	7 September 1977	12 October 1977
Danny McGrain	1973–1982	10	62	28 May 1980	15 June 1982
Asa Hartford	1972–1982	3	50	16 May 1981	18 November 1981
Graeme Souness	1974–1986	27	54	24 May 1982	8 June 1986
Paul Hegarty	1979–1983	1	8	24 May 1983	24 May 1983
Willie Miller	1975–1989	11	65	12 June 1983	19 October 1988
Roy Aitken	1979–1991	27	57	15 October 1986	20 June 1990
Alex McLeish	1980–1993	8	77	2 December 1987	17 February 1993
Jim Leighton	1982–1998	4	91	30 May 1989	7 June 1995
Paul McStay	1983–1997	7	76	12 September 1990	12 October 1994
Maurice Malpas	1984–1992	2	55	14 November 1990	3 June 1992
Richard Gough	1983–1993	8	61	6 February 1991	28 April 1993
Gordon Strachan	1980–1992	5	50	1 May 1991	25 March 1992
Craig Levein	1990–1994	1	16	24 March 1993	24 March 1993
Gary McAllister	1990–1999	32	57	8 September 1993	31 March 1999
Ally McCoist	1986–1998	1	61	27 March 1996	27 March 1996
Colin Hendry	1993–2001	22	51	26 May 1996	28 March 2001
Tom Boyd	1990–2001	6	72	12 November 1997	25 April 2001
Paul Lambert	1995–2003	17	40	9 October 1999	10 September 2003
Kevin Gallacher	1988–2001	1	53	7 October 2000	7 October 2000
Craig Burley	1995–2003	1	46	6 October 2001	6 October 2001
Christian Dailly	1997–2008	12	66	16 May 2002	12 November 2005
Barry Ferguson	1998–2009	28	45	6 September 2003	28 March 2009
Darren Fletcher	2004–2017	34	80	27 May 2004	8 October 2017
Steven Pressley	2000–2006	1	32	30 May 2004	30 May 2004
Jackie McNamara	1996–2005	1	33	17 November 2004	17 November 2004
David Weir	1997–2010	4	68	11 May 2006	6 September 2006
Stephen McManus	2006–2010	8	26	26 March 2008	14 November 2009
Kenny Miller	2001–2013	5	67	9 February 2011	10 August 2011
Gary Caldwell	2002–2013	7	55	29 February 2012	26 March 2013
Scott Brown	2005–2017	25	55	6 February 2013	4 September 2017
James Morrison	2008–2017	1	46	7 June 2013	7 June 2013
Kieran Tierney*	2016–	1	60	9 November 2017	9 November 2017
Charlie Mulgrew	2012–2019	4	44	23 March 2018	11 June 2019
Scott McKenna*	2018–	1	54	2 June 2018	2 June 2018
Andy Robertson*	2014–	81	103	7 September 2018	16 November 2026
Callum McGregor	2017–2024	1	63	21 March 2019	21 March 2019
Steven Naismith	2007–2019	2	51	16 November 2019	19 November 2019
John McGinn*	2016–	9	95	14 October 2020	19 November 2022
Scott McTominay*	2018–	1	75	17 October 2023	17 October 2023

Statistics include official FIFA recognised matches, five matches from a 1967 overseas tour that were reclassified as full internationals in 2021, and a match against a Hong Kong League XI played on 23 May 2002 that the Scottish Football Association includes in its statistical totals.

== Unofficial games ==
The above list considers captains selected for games officially recognised by FIFA and the Scottish Football Association. In addition to these, there have been a number of games played by Scotland teams on an unofficial basis, for example the "wartime internationals" during the Second World War. Some of the captains selected for these unofficial games are listed below.

- Jimmy Brownlie
- Jimmy Gordon
- Tom Smith
- Matt Busby
- Bill Shankly
- Tommy Walker
- Jock Shaw
- George Young
