= Scotland Men's International Roll of Honour =

Association football hall of fame

The Scotland Men's International Roll of Honour is a list established by the Scottish Football Association recognising players who have gained 50 or more international caps for Scotland. The roll of honour was launched in February 1988, when 11 players had already achieved the distinction. Each player inducted receives a commemorative gold medal, an invitation to every Scotland home match and has their portrait hung in the Scottish Football Museum.

As of 6 October 2026, there are 45 players on the roll of honour. Billy Gilmour is the most recent addition, having won his 50th cap on 6 October 2026 against Slovenia.

In July 2017, the SFA launched the Women's International Roll of Honour, which recognises players who have won 100 or more caps for Scotland women's national football team. The women's roll of honour initially included 12 players.

== Players on the roll of honour ==
Key

| * | Still active for the national team |

As of Switzerland v Scotland, 16 November 2026

Scotland Men's International Roll of Honour
| Rank | Player | Image | Clubs (Note: Only clubs the players were with when they received full international caps are included.) | Caps | Debut | | 50th match | | Refs. |
| Rank | Player | Image | Clubs | Caps | Date | Opponent | Date | Opponent | Refs. |
|---|---|---|---|---|---|---|---|---|---|
| 1 | Andy Robertson* | | Dundee United; Hull City; Liverpool; Tottenham Hotspur | 103 | 5 March 2014 | Poland | 4 September 2021 | Moldova | |
| 2 | Kenny Dalglish | | Celtic; Liverpool | 102 | 10 November 1971 | Belgium | 12 October 1977 | Wales | |
| 3 | John McGinn* | | Hibernian; Aston Villa | 95 | 29 March 2016 | Denmark | 24 September 2022 | Republic of Ireland | |
| 4 | Jim Leighton | | Aberdeen; Manchester United; Hibernian | 91 | 13 October 1982 | East Germany | 30 May 1989 | Chile | |
| 5 | Craig Gordon | | Heart of Midlothian; Sunderland; Celtic | 84 | 30 May 2004 | Trinidad and Tobago | 5 October 2017 | Slovakia | |
| 6 | Darren Fletcher | | Manchester United; West Bromwich Albion; Stoke City | 80 | 20 August 2003 | Norway | 7 September 2010 | Liechtenstein | |
| 7 | Alex McLeish | | Aberdeen | 77 | 26 March 1980 | Portugal | 2 December 1987 | Luxembourg | |
| 8 | Ryan Christie* | | Aberdeen; Celtic; Bournemouth | 76 | 9 November 2017 | Netherlands | 14 June 2024 | Germany | |
| 8 | Paul McStay | – | Celtic | 76 | 21 September 1983 | Uruguay | 12 September 1990 | Romania | |
| 10 | Scott McTominay* | | Manchester United; Napoli | 75 | 23 March 2018 | Costa Rica | 14 June 2024 | Germany | |
| 11 | Tom Boyd | – | Motherwell; Chelsea; Celtic | 72 | 12 September 1990 | Romania | 11 October 1997 | Latvia | |
| 12 | Grant Hanley* | | Blackburn Rovers; Newcastle United; Norwich City; Birmingham City; Hibernian | 70 | 25 May 2011 | Wales | 7 June 2024 | Finland | |
| 13= | Kenny Miller | | Rangers; Wolverhampton Wanderers; Celtic; Derby County; Bursaspor; Cardiff City; Vancouver Whitecaps | 69 | 25 April 2001 | Poland | 8 October 2010 | Czech Republic | |
| 13= | David Weir | | Heart of Midlothian; Everton; Rangers | 69 | 27 May 1997 | Wales | 6 September 2006 | Lithuania | |
| 15 | Christian Dailly | | Blackburn Rovers; Derby County; West Ham United; Rangers | 67 | 27 May 1997 | Wales | 15 November 2003 | Netherlands | |
| 16 | Willie Miller | – | Aberdeen | 65 | 1 June 1975 | Romania | 8 June 1986 | West Germany | |
| 17 | Callum McGregor | | Celtic | 63 | 9 November 2017 | Netherlands | 25 March 2023 | Cyprus | |
| 18 | Danny McGrain | | Celtic | 62 | 12 May 1973 | Wales | 25 February 1981 | Israel | |
| 19= | Richard Gough | – | Dundee United; Tottenham Hotspur; Rangers | 61 | 30 March 1983 | Switzerland | 11 June 1990 | Costa Rica | |
| 19= | Ally McCoist | | Rangers; Kilmarnock | 61 | 29 April 1986 | Netherlands | 27 March 1996 | Australia | |
| 19= | Kenny McLean* | | Aberdeen; Norwich City | 61 | 24 March 2016 | Czech Republic | 23 March 2025 | Greece | |
| 22 | Kieran Tierney* | | Celtic; Arsenal; Real Sociedad | 60 | 29 March 2016 | Denmark | 6 June 2025 | Iceland | |
| 23 | John Collins | – | Hibernian; Celtic; Monaco; Everton | 58 | 17 February 1988 | Saudi Arabia | 10 June 1998 | Brazil | |
| 24= | Roy Aitken | | Celtic; Newcastle United; St Mirren | 57 | 12 September 1979 | Peru | 15 November 1989 | Norway | |
| 24= | Gary McAllister | | Leicester City; Leeds United; Coventry City | 57 | 25 April 1990 | East Germany | 30 April 1997 | Sweden | |
| 26= | Scott Brown | | Hibernian; Celtic | 55 | 12 November 2005 | United States | 29 March 2016 | Denmark | |
| 26= | Gary Caldwell | | Newcastle United; Hibernian; Celtic; Wigan Athletic | 55 | 27 March 2002 | France | 8 September 2012 | Serbia | |
| 26= | Denis Law | | Huddersfield Town; Manchester City; Torino; Manchester United | 55 | 18 October 1958 | Wales | 26 September 1973 | Czechoslovakia | |
| 26= | Maurice Malpas | – | Dundee United | 55 | 1 June 1984 | France | 3 June 1992 | Norway | |
| 30= | Billy Bremner | | Leeds United | 54 | 8 May 1965 | Spain | 18 June 1974 | Brazil | |
| 30= | Scott McKenna* | | Aberdeen; Nottingham Forest; Copenhagen; Las Palmas; Dinamo Zagreb | 54 | 23 March 2018 | Costa Rica | 30 May 2026 | Curaçao | |
| 30= | Graeme Souness | | Middlesbrough; Liverpool; Sampdoria; Rangers | 54 | 30 October 1974 | East Germany | 4 December 1985 | Australia | |
| 30= | George Young | – | Rangers | 54 | 15 May 1946 | Switzerland | 7 November 1956 | Northern Ireland | |
| 34= | Stuart Armstrong | | Celtic; Southampton; Vancouver Whitecaps | 53 | 26 March 2017 | Slovenia | 26 March 2024 | Northern Ireland | |
| 34= | Lyndon Dykes* | | Queens Park Rangers; Birmingham City; Charlton Athletic | 53 | 4 September 2020 | Israel | 31 March 2026 | Ivory Coast | |
| 34= | Kevin Gallacher | – | Dundee United; Coventry City; Blackburn Rovers; Newcastle United | 53 | 17 May 1988 | Colombia | 7 October 2000 | San Marino | |
| 34= | Alan Rough | – | Partick Thistle; Hibernian | 53 | 7 April 1976 | Switzerland | 18 June 1982 | Brazil | |
| 38 | Joe Jordan | | Leeds United; Manchester United; Milan | 52 | 19 May 1973 | England | 24 May 1982 | Wales | |
| 38 | Billy Gilmour* | | Chelsea; Norwich City; Brighton & Hove Albion; Napoli | 52 | 2 June 2021 | Netherlands | 6 October 2026 | Slovenia | |
| 39= | Ché Adams* | | Southampton; Torino | 51 | 21 March 2021 | Austria | 24 June 2026 | Brazil | |
| 39= | Colin Hendry | | Blackburn Rovers; Rangers; Coventry City; Bolton Wanderers | 51 | 19 May 1993 | Estonia | 24 March 2001 | Belgium | |
| 39= | Steven Naismith | | Kilmarnock; Rangers; Everton; Norwich City; Heart of Midlothian | 51 | 6 June 2007 | Faroe Islands | 16 November 2019 | Cyprus | |
| 43= | Asa Hartford | – | West Bromwich Albion; Manchester City; Everton | 50 | 26 April 1972 | Peru | 18 June 1982 | Brazil | |
| 43= | Alan Hutton | | Rangers; Tottenham Hotspur; Sunderland; Aston Villa; Mallorca; Bolton Wanderers | 50 | 30 May 2007 | Austria | 24 March 2016 | Czech Republic | |
| 43= | Gordon Strachan | | Aberdeen; Manchester United; Leeds United | 50 | 16 May 1980 | Northern Ireland | 25 March 1992 | Finland | |

== See also ==
- Scottish Football Hall of Fame
- List of Scotland international footballers with one cap
- List of Scotland international footballers (2–3 caps)
- List of Scotland international footballers (4–9 caps)
- List of Scotland international footballers (10+ caps)
- List of Scotland women's international footballers
