= Tom Townsley =

Scottish footballer and manager

Personal information
- Full name: Thomas Townsley
- Date of birth: 28 April 1898
- Place of birth: Polmont, Scotland
- Date of death: 10 April 1976 (aged 77)
- Place of death: Peterhead, Scotland
- Positions: Centre-back; right back

Senior career*
| Years | Team | Apps | (Gls) |
| – | Laurieston Villa | | |
| – | Cowie Wanderers | | |
| – | California Celtic | | |
| 1919–1925 | Falkirk | 244 | (14) |
| 1925–1931 | Leeds United | 159 | (2) |
| 1931–1933 | Falkirk | 24 | (0) |
| 1933–1934 | Bo'ness | | |
| 1934–1938 | Peterhead | | |
| Total | | 427 | (16) |

International career
| 1923–1925 | Scottish League XI | 4 | (0) |
| 1925 | Scotland | 1 | (0) |

Managerial career
- 1938–1958: Peterhead
- * Club domestic league appearances and goals

Thomas Townsley (28 April 1898 – 10 April 1976) was a Scottish footballer who played as a centre half for Falkirk (two spells), Leeds United and Scotland. Townsley was also manager of Peterhead.

== See also ==
- List of Scotland national football team captains
