= Bill McGuire =

Bill McGuire may refer to:

- Bill McGuire (volcanologist) (born 1954), British volcanologist
- Bill McGuire (baseball) (born 1964), former Major League Baseball catcher
- Bill McGuire (footballer), Irish soccer player during the 1930s
- Bill McGuire (murder victim), a man killed by his wife in 2004
- Bill McGuire (runner), winner of the 1000 yards at the 1947 USA Indoor Track and Field Championships
- Billy McGuire, one of the World's Heaviest Twins

== See also ==
- William McGuire (disambiguation)
