= David Morris (Scottish footballer) =

Scottish footballer

Personal information
- Full name: David Main Liston Morris
- Date of birth: 1897
- Place of birth: Leith, Scotland
- Date of death: 1971 (aged 73–74)
- Place of death: Edinburgh, Scotland
- Position: Centre half

Senior career*
Years	Team	Apps	(Gls)
–	Arniston Rangers		
–	Newtongrange Star		
1920–1925	Raith Rovers	184	(6)
1925–1929	Preston North End	146	(7)
1929–1931	Chester City		
1931–1933	Dundee United	12	(0)
- Leith Athletic

International career
1923–1925	Scotland	6	(1)
1925	Scottish League XI	1	(0)
- * Club domestic league appearances and goals

David Main Liston Morris (1897 – 1971) was a Scottish footballer who played as a centre half for Newtongrange Star, Arniston Rangers, Raith Rovers, Preston North End, Chester City, Dundee United and Scotland national team.

After moving from the junior level where he had combined football with work as a shipbuilder in his native Leith, Morris helped Raith Rovers achieve their best-ever Scottish Football League finishes of third in 1921–22 then fourth in 1923–24 before going south to Preston in December 1925, a few months after Alex James made the same move. However, the pair (and several other Scots in the squad) were unable to achieve promotion from the English second division and both departed from Deepdale in 1929. After two years with Chester, he returned to Scotland with Dundee United in 1931.

Morris received all six of his caps for Scotland (and one for the Scottish Football League XI) while with Raith Rovers. He is the only serving player from the Kirkcaldy club to have been international captain and appeared for his country six times in total, finishing on the winning side five times with the other match drawn.

== See also ==
- List of Scotland national football team captains
