= Alex Dick =

Scottish footballer

Personal information
- Full name: Alexander Russell Dick
- Date of birth: 1894
- Place of birth: Harthill, Scotland
- Date of death: 1958 (aged 63–64)
- Place of death: Harthill, Scotland
- Position: Right back

Senior career*
Years	Team	Apps	(Gls)
–	Armadale		
1919–1927	Airdrieonians	244	(2)
1919–1920	Armadale (loan)		
1927–1928	Dykehead		
- * Club domestic league appearances and goals

Alexander Russell "Sanny" Dick (1894 – 1958) was a Scottish footballer who played as a right back for Airdrieonians.

Installed as a first-team regular in defence in his second season (he initially played as a forward after joining from Armadale and featured less frequently), he missed only eight league matches across the four consecutive seasons where the Diamonds finished as runners-up in the Scottish Football League and also played in the 1924 Scottish Cup Final in which Airdrie defeated Hibernian to claim their only major trophy. In 1927 he was advised to stop playing football for health reasons, and Jimmy Crapnell was brought in as a replacement; Dick had a brief spell with Dykehead in his home district after leaving Broomfield Park.
