= Jock White =

Scottish footballer

Personal information
- Date of birth: 27 August 1897
- Place of birth: Coatbridge, Scotland
- Date of death: 11 February 1986 (aged 88)
- Positions: Centre forward; inside forward

Senior career*
Years	Team	Apps	(Gls)
????–1920	Bedlay Juniors		
1920–1922	Albion Rovers	66	(29)
1922–1927	Heart of Midlothian	163	(99)
1927–1930	Leeds United	102	(36)
1930–1934	Heart of Midlothian	121	(55)
1934–1935	Margate		

International career
1922–1923	Scotland	2	(0)
1923–1926	Scottish League XI	4	(5)
- * Club domestic league appearances and goals

John White (27 August 1897 – 11 February 1986) was a Scottish footballer who played as a forward. He played for Albion Rovers and Heart of Midlothian (two spells) in his native country, and Leeds United in England. While at Hearts, in 1926 he achieved the highly unusual feat of scoring four goals in three successive matches.

He also gained two caps for the Scotland national team, and is the only Albion Rovers player ever to be capped while on the club's books.

== Personal life ==
Born in Coatbridge, Jock White was one of four brothers who played top-class football — Willie was a goalkeeper with Hamilton Academical, Hearts and Southampton, Tom a winger who played with Hearts and Alloa Athletic, and Jimmy aka 'Tec' a forward with Albion Rovers (playing alongside Jock in the 1920 Scottish Cup Final which Albion lost to Kilmarnock), Motherwell and in the United States. All four brothers played together for Hearts in the Lord Provost's Rent Relief Cup final of 1923 which their side won through two goals from Jock.

He was also the brother-in-law of Andrew Anderson, a team-mate at Hearts for four seasons.

== See also ==
- List of Scotland international footballers (2–3 caps)
- List of Scottish football families
