= John Johnston (footballer, born 1902) =

Scottish footballer

Personal information
- Full name: John Ainslie Johnston
- Date of birth: 17 November 1902
- Place of birth: Stevenston, Scotland
- Date of death: 12 October 1987 (aged 84)
- Place of death: Kilwinning, Scotland
- Position: Centre half

Senior career*
Years	Team	Apps	(Gls)
–	Ardeer Thistle		
1921–1935	Heart of Midlothian	274	(9)
1922	→ Stevenston United (loan)		
1926	→ Cowdenbeath (loan)	10	(0)
1935–1936	Arbroath	8	(0)
Total		292	(9)

International career
1928–1932	Scottish League XI	3	(0)
1929–1932	Scotland	3	(0)
- * Club domestic league appearances and goals

John Ainslie Johnston (17 November 1902 – 12 October 1987) was a Scottish footballer who played as a centre-half for Heart of Midlothian, where he spent 14 years (as well as half-season loans at Stevenston United and Cowdenbeath and a short spell with Arbroath before retiring), and the Scotland national team.

== See also ==
- List of Scotland national football team captains
