= Andrew Anderson (footballer) =

Scottish footballer

Personal information
- Full name: Andrew Smellie Anderson
- Date of birth: 21 February 1909
- Place of birth: Airdrie, Scotland
- Date of death: 18 August 1991 (aged 82)
- Place of death: Airdrie, Scotland
- Height: 5 ft 9 in (1.75 m)
- Position: Right back

Senior career*
Years	Team	Apps	(Gls)
1929–1939	Baillieston Juniors		
1929–1941	Heart of Midlothian	315	(4)

International career
1933–1938	Scotland	23	(0)
1934–1936	Scottish League XI	4	(0)
- * Club domestic league appearances and goals

Andrew Smellie Anderson (21 February 1909 – 18 August 1991) was a Scottish footballer who played for Heart of Midlothian and the Scotland national team.

Anderson, a right back born in Airdrie, joined Hearts in 1929 from Baillieston Juniors and remained with the Edinburgh club for the remainder of his career, retiring in 1941 at the age of 32, although his last competitive appearances were prior to the outbreak of World War II in 1939. Including all cups and wartime tournaments, he made 497 appearances for the club, with 354 of those in the Scottish Football League and Scottish Cup. He never won a major honour, the closest he got being three Scottish Cup semi-final defeats and a runners-up finish in the league in 1937–38, three points behind winners Celtic.

He won 23 caps for Scotland between 1933 and 1938 (also participating in an SFA tour of North America in 1935) and four caps for the Scottish League XI.

Anderson's brother-in-law Jock White, also an Airdrie man, played for Hearts and Scotland several years before Anderson. White returned to Hearts from Leeds United in 1930 and the two played together for four seasons.

After his playing retirement, Anderson worked as a joiner.

== See also ==
- List of Scotland national football team captains
