= Andy McCombie =

Scottish footballer

Personal information
- Full name: Andrew McCombie
- Date of birth: 30 June 1876
- Place of birth: Inverness, Scotland
- Date of death: 28 March 1952 (aged 75)
- Place of death: North Shields, England
- Height: 5 ft 9 1/2 in (1.77 m)
- Position: Right back

Senior career*
Years	Team	Apps	(Gls)
- Inverness Thistle
1898–1904	Sunderland	157	(6)
1904–1910	Newcastle United	113	(0)

International career
1903–1905	Scotland	4	(0)
- * Club domestic league appearances and goals

Andrew McCombie (30 June 1876 – 28 March 1952) was a Scottish international footballer who played at right back for North East England rival clubs Sunderland and Newcastle United. He won the Football League championship with both clubs, and was twice on the losing side in the FA Cup final. He went on to have a long career as a coach with Newcastle.

== Career ==
=== Sunderland ===
McCombie was born in Inverness (where he was a neighbour of future teammate Peter McWilliam) and started his career at Inverness Thistle before moving south of the border to join Sunderland in December 1898. He made his first team debut away to Sheffield Wednesday on 18 February 1899, while regular right-back Philip Bach was playing for England at Roker Park, Sunderland. In Bach's absence on international duty, McCombie took over at right-back in a 1–0 victory. Bach was unable to regain his place, making only two further appearances before he was transferred to Middlesbrough.

McCombie was an ever-present in his first full season, with Sunderland finishing third in the League table. The following season McCombie only missed one game as Sunderland finished runners-up, with McCombie and Jimmy Watson teaming up in front of goalkeeper Ned Doig. The three Scottish internationals appeared in a notable total of 109 league and cup games between February 1900 and February 1904.

In 1901–02 McCombie missed the final eight games, as Sunderland claimed the Championship by a three-point margin over Everton.

In 1903–04, Sunderland were rocked by a financial scandal involving McCombie. Sunderland's board of Directors gave the player £100 to start up in business, with the view that his benefit game would see him repay the money. The benefit game (unusually, a league fixture against Middlesbrough rather than a friendly) drew in £500 for the player but cost the club in expenses; they requested McCombie repay the £100 but he viewed it as a gift and refused to do so. After a subsequent County Court judgement found in the club's favour, The Football Association launched an inquiry and agreed with McCombie, stating that it was a "resigning/win/draw bonus" and furthermore the books of Sunderland showed financial irregularities, violating the rules of the game. Sunderland were fined £250, with six directors being suspended for two and a half years, and manager Alex Mackie receiving a suspension.

His final appearance for Sunderland was in a 6–0 victory over Bury on 23 January 1904. His last goal came against his future employers, a penalty in a 1–1 draw at Roker Park on 1 January 1904. In his 5 years with Sunderland, he made a total of 164 appearances in all competitions, scoring six goals.

=== Newcastle United ===
In February 1904, McCombie was transferred to Sunderland's arch-rivals Newcastle United, being keen to stay in the area due to the business he had set up with the financial assistance from his former employers; he is reported to have signed for £700, a world record transfer fee, exceeding the £520 paid by Sunderland in June 1904 for Alf Common. He was to remain on the payroll at Newcastle until shortly before his death.

He made his Newcastle debut in a 4–1 victory over Notts County on 13 February 1904. In his first match back at Roker Park for his new employers on 24 December 1904 he scored a first-minute own goal as Sunderland ran out 3–1 victors. In his first full season at St James' Park he missed only three games as Newcastle claimed the Football League title for the first time by a single point margin over Everton.

He was part of the Newcastle United team which was beaten 2–0 by Aston Villa at the Crystal Palace ground in the 1905 FA Cup Final. He was to return to Crystal Palace for the 1906 FA Cup Final, when he was again on the losing side as Newcastle went down 1–0 to Everton.

Newcastle claimed the title for a second time in 1906–07 with McCombie making 26 appearances. In Newcastle's third championship season, 1908–09, McCombie only made one appearance. He remained as a player at St James' Park until 1910, with his final game being a 4–0 defeat at Aston Villa on 27 April 1910.

In his six years at Newcastle, he made a total of 132 first team appearances, never scoring.

=== International ===
McCombie's first international appearance for Scotland came in a 1–0 victory over Wales on 9 March 1903. In the next match, against England on 4 April, he was teamed in defence with his Sunderland colleagues, Doig and Watson, resulting in a Scottish victory by 2 goals to 1. In the wake of his first title win with Newcastle in 1905, he made two further appearances for Scotland with a 3–1 loss to Wales on 6 March and a 1–0 defeat by England on 1 April; in the latter match, played at Crystal Palace, he partnered Jimmy Watson in defence and was joined by Magpies teammates Andy Aitken, Peter McWilliam and James Howie.

McCombie's family was Gaelic-speaking and he was one of the first players with the indigenous language to have been selected for Scotland, something usually attributed to Johnny MacKenzie 50 years later.

=== Coaching career ===
After retiring as a player, he remained on Newcastle United's coaching staff, rising to become the first team trainer by the time he retired in 1950 and died two years later in 1952.

== Honours ==
Sunderland

- Football League champions: 1901–02

Newcastle United

- Football League champions: 1904–05, 1906–07
- FA Cup: runner-up: 1905, 1906

== See also ==
- List of Scottish Gaelic-speaking people
