= Jimmy Crapnell =

Scottish footballer and manager

Personal information
- Full name: James Scrymagour Crapnell
- Date of birth: 4 June 1903
- Place of birth: Paisley, Scotland
- Date of death: 24 December 1991 (aged 88)
- Place of death: Paisley, Scotland
- Height: 5 ft 5 in (1.65 m)
- Position: Right back

Senior career*
| Years | Team | Apps | (Gls) |
| – | Cambuslang Rangers | | |
| 1926–1933 | Airdrieonians | 227 | (1) |
| 1933–1937 | Motherwell | 41 | (0) |
| Total | | 268 | (1) |

International career
| 1929–1932 | Scotland | 9 | (0) |
| 1929–1932 | Scottish League XI | 5 | (0) |

Managerial career
- 1945–1946: Alloa Athletic
- 1947–1953: St Johnstone
- * Club domestic league appearances and goals

James Scrymagour Crapnell (4 June 1903 – 24 December 1991) was a Scottish football player and manager. He played as a right back for Airdrieonians and Motherwell at club level, and represented both Scotland and the Scottish League XI.

== Career ==
Crapnell, who was born in Paisley, began his club career in the junior leagues with Cambuslang Rangers. He was already 23 when he moved to Airdrie in 1926 as a replacement for Alex Dick who had been advised to stop playing, but within three years he had become the Diamonds club captain and achieved international recognition, receiving all of his caps while with Airdrie.

Motherwell signed him in January 1933 for a fee of £2,000. He helped them reach the 1933 Scottish Cup Final, but they lost 1–0 to Celtic. He retired in 1934 to try a career in insurance. After a brief comeback in the Motherwell reserve team, he retired again.

Crapnell was 5 feet 5 inches tall, which was small for a defender. He had a "reputation for tenacity", however, and won nine Scotland caps between 1929 and 1933, only finishing on the losing side once and captaining the team in four of those appearances. He is the most capped player in Airdrieonians' history. Crapnell also represented the Scottish League XI five times (all victories) between 1929 and 1932.

Crapnell became a manager after the Second World War, working for Alloa Athletic and then St Johnstone. He died in December 1991, aged 88.

== See also ==
- List of Scotland national football team captains
