= Gilbert Rankin =

Scottish footballer

Personal information
- Full name: Gilbert Rankin
- Date of birth: 20 March 1870
- Place of birth: Alexandria, Scotland
- Date of death: 28 November 1927 (aged 57)
- Place of death: Hornsey, England
- Position: Inside forward

Senior career*
Years	Team	Apps	(Gls)
1887–1892	Vale of Leven	10	(0)
1892–1893	Renton	6	(0)
1893–1895	Vale of Leven		

International career
1890–1891	Scotland	2	(3)
- * Club domestic league appearances and goals

Gilbert Rankin (20 March 1870 – 28 November 1927) was a Scottish footballer who played as an inside forward.

== Career ==
Born in Alexandria, Rankin played club football locally for Vale of Leven (featuring on the losing side in the 1890 Scottish Cup Final) and Renton, but quit the game aged 25, later moving to England. He scored three times in two appearances for Scotland, with a hat-trick on his debut against Ireland in 1890. (Note: Most sources state he scored two goals, with the other given to John McPherson, but contemporary reports state that Rankin scored all three.)

== See also ==
- List of Scotland national football team hat-tricks
