= Jimmy Simpson (footballer, born 1873) =

Scottish footballer

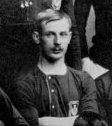
- Simpson in Scotland kit, 1895

Personal information
- Full name: James Simpson
- Date of birth: 2 April 1873
- Place of birth: Ardrossan, Scotland
- Position: Right half

Senior career*
Years	Team	Apps	(Gls)
- Saltcoats Victoria
1894–1904	Third Lanark	105	(4)

International career
1895	Scotland	3	(0)
- * Club domestic league appearances and goals

James Simpson (born 2 April 1873) was a Scottish footballer who played as a right half.

== Career ==
Born in Ardrossan, Simpson played club football for Saltcoats Victoria and Third Lanark, and made three appearances for Scotland in 1895.
