= Henry McNeil =

Henry McNeil may refer to:

- Henry McNeil (footballer) (1849–1924), Scottish footballer
- Henry Everett McNeil (1862–1929), American author
