= William McGuire (footballer) =

Scottish footballer

Personal information
- Date of birth: 24 March 1860
- Place of birth: Beith, Scotland
- Date of death: 14 March 1925 (aged 64)
- Place of death: Prestwick, Scotland
- Height: 5 ft 10 in (1.78 m)
- Position: Centre forward

Senior career*
Years	Team	Apps	(Gls)
- Beith Thistle
1877–1882	Beith		
1882–1883	Darwen		

International career
1881	Scotland	2	(0)
- * Club domestic league appearances and goals

William McGuire (born 24 March 1860) was a Scottish footballer who played as a centre forward.

== Career ==
Born in Beith, McGuire played club football for Beith Thistle, Beith and Darwen, and made two appearances for Scotland in 1881 (a 6–1 victory over England and a 5–1 win against Wales). He was the only serving Beith player to have been selected for international duty. Injuries during his spell in England with Darwen brought his playing career to an end in 1883.
