= Jimmy Watson (footballer, born 1877) =

Scottish footballer

Personal information
- Full name: James Watson
- Date of birth: 4 October 1877
- Place of birth: Motherwell, Scotland
- Date of death: 12 June 1942 (aged 64)
- Place of death: Victoria, British Columbia, Canada
- Position: Left back

Senior career*
Years	Team	Apps	(Gls)
1895–1897	Burnbank Athletic		
1897–1900	Clyde	35	(1)
1900–1907	Sunderland	211	(0)
1907–1910	Middlesbrough	103	(0)
1910–1911	Shildon		

International career
1903–1909	Scotland	6	(0)
- * Club domestic league appearances and goals

James Watson (4 October 1877 – 12 June 1942) was a Scottish footballer who played at left back. He won the Football League championship with Sunderland in 1901–02 and made six appearances for Scotland.

== Career ==
=== Early career ===
Watson was born in Motherwell and played for Burnbank Athletic before joining Clyde.

=== Sunderland ===
He joined Sunderland in 1899, after a trial at Sheffield United. His debut came in a 0–0 draw against Glossop North End on 24 February 1900. He went on to make three league appearances that season. The following season he only missed two games as Sunderland finished runners-up, with Watson and Andy McCombie teaming up in front of goal-keeper Ned Doig. The three Scottish internationals appeared in a notable total of 109 league and cup games between February 1900 and February 1904 when McCombie was transferred to Newcastle United.

He came to be considered as one of the finest full backs in the country. He possessed the intriguing nickname of "Daddy Long Legs" due to his arms and legs moving excessively when he ran. In 1901–02 Watson only missed one game, as Sunderland claimed the Championship by a three-point margin over Everton.

Watson's first Scotland match came on 9 March 1903 in a 1–0 victory over Wales. In the next match, against England on 4 April, Watson was teamed in defence with his Sunderland colleagues, Doig and McCombie, resulting in a Scottish victory by 2 goals to 1. He went on to play against England in each of the next two years, both matches won 1–0 by England.

Watson remained at Sunderland until 1907, when he moved to Middlesbrough. In his Sunderland career he played a total of 225 matches, never scoring.

=== Middlesbrough ===
He remained at Middlesbrough until 1910 making over 100 appearances. In March 1909 he was recalled to the Scotland team making appearances against Ireland and England.

He later emigrated to Canada.

== Honours ==
Sunderland

- Football League champions: 1901–02
