= List of Scottish football families =

This is a list of Scottish football (soccer) families.

Families included on the list must have

1. at least, one member of the family is capped by a national team on the senior level or an important person in the game of football (e.g., notable coaches, referees, club chairmen, etc.)
2. a second member must be a professional player or capped by a national team on the U-17 level or above.

The most senior family member is listed first.

== List ==
=== A ===
- Charlie Adam Sr., Charlie Adam (son), Grant Adam (son)
- David Anderson, Harry Anderson (brother)

=== B ===
- (United States) Gerry Baker, (England) Joe Baker (brother), (Australia) Ryan Strain (grandson) (Note: The Baker brothers were raised in Scotland but born in other countries, and were only eligible to represent those at the time.)
- Eamonn Bannon, Paul Telfer (nephew)
- Barney Battles, Sr., Barney Battles, Jr.
- Martin Bavidge, Alfie Bavidge (son)
- Bobby Baxter Sr, (England) Bobby Baxter Jr (son)
- Jim Baxter, George Kinnell (second cousin), Andy Kinnell (second cousin), Ian Dair (brother-in-law), Jason Dair (nephew), Lee Dair (nephew)
- Jack Bell, (Note: Jack Bell's great-grandson Tom Smith played international rugby union for Scotland.) Laurie Bell (brother)
- Alec Bennett, (Note: Alec Bennett's grandson Sandy Carmichael played international rugby union for Scotland.) James Bennett (brother)
- Peter Bennie, Bob Bennie (brother), John Bennie (brother), Peter Bennie (son), Bob Bennie (nephew)
- William Berry, Davidson Berry (brother)
- Jim Bett, (Iceland) Baldur Bett (son), (Iceland) Calum Bett (son)
- Ian Black Sr., Ian Black Jr. (son)
- Bob Blyth, William Blyth (brother), Robert Blyth (son), Alec Shankly (nephew), Jimmy Shankly (nephew), John Shankly (nephew), Bob Shankly (nephew), Bill Shankly (nephew)
- Andy Bowman, Dave Bowman (son)
- Rachael Boyle (née Small), (Australia) Martin Boyle (husband)
- James Brandon, Tom Brandon (brother), Harry Brandon (cousin), (England) Tom Brandon Jr (nephew / son of Tom)
- Des Bremner, Kevin Bremner (brother)
- Hutton Bremner, Gordon Bremner (brother)
- Frank Brogan, Jim Brogan (brother)
- Craig Brown, Jock Brown (brother)
- Brown (2): see Lambie
- John Browning Sr, John Browning Jr. (son)
- John Brownlie, Paul Brownlie (son)
- Daniel Bruce, Walter Bruce (brother)
- Martin Buchan, George Buchan (brother), Jamie Buchan (son)
- Campbell Forsyth, Stuart Burgess (son), (Australia) Cameron Burgess (grandson)
- George Burley, Craig Burley (nephew)
- Matt Busby, (England) Don Gibson (son-in-law)
- (England) Terry Butcher, Pat Nevin (cousin)

=== C ===
- Steve Cadden, Chris Cadden (son), Nicky Cadden (son, twin brother of Chris)
- Paul Caddis, Liam Caddis (brother)
- Colin Calder, Michael Green, Danny Green (brothers-in-law)
- David Calderhead Sr., David Calderhead Jr. (son)
- Steven Caldwell, Gary Caldwell (brother)
- Callaghan: see Flannigan
- Dick Campbell, Ian Campbell (twin brother), Iain Campbell (son)
- John Capaldi, (Northern Ireland) Tony Capaldi (son)
- David Chalmers, Stevie Chalmers (son), Paul Chalmers (grandson)
- Jack Chaplin, George Chaplin (brother), Alex Chaplin (brother)
- Charlie Christie, Ryan Christie (son)
- Robert Christie, Alex Christie (brother)
- John Clark, Martin Clark (son)
- Paul Clarke, Steve Clarke (brother)
- William Collier, Jock Collier (brother)
- Donald Colman, Rachel Corsie (great-granddaughter)
- James Comrie, George Comrie (brother), John Comrie (cousin), Malcolm Comrie (nephew)
- Alfie Conn Sr., Alfie Conn Jr. (son)
- Mike Conroy Sr., Mike Conroy Jr. (son)
- Doug Considine, Andy Considine (son)
- Neale Cooper, Alex Cooper (son)
- James Cowan, John Cowan (brother)
- Don Cowie, Shelley Grant (wife – also twin sister of Suzanne Grant, below)
- Sammy Cox, Jackie Cox (cousin)
- Joe Craig, Steven Craig (son)
- Paddy Crerand, Charlie Gallagher (cousin), (England) Danny Crerand (son)
- Willie Cringan, Peter Nellies (brother-in-law), Robert Cringan (brother), Jimmy Cringan (brother)
- John Cross, Willie Cross (brother)
- Andy Cunningham, William Cunningham (brother)
- Willie Cunningham, Jimmy Baxter (cousin)

=== D ===
- Kenny Dalglish, Paul Dalglish (son)
- Billy Davies, John Davies (brother), John Spencer (brother-in-law), Brad Spencer (nephew – son of John Spencer)
- Paul Deas, Robbie Deas (uncle)
- Jimmy Delaney, Pat Delaney (son), John Kennedy (grandson)
- Divers – see Gallacher
- Martin Doak, Ben Gannon Doak (grandson)
- Tommy Docherty, (England) Mick Docherty (son)
- Tom Donnelly, Simon Donnelly (son)
- Billy Dougall, Peter Dougall (brother), Jimmy Dougal (brother), Neil Dougall (son)
- Peter Dowds, Mike Haughney (great-nephew)
- Bill Dowie, (United States) Christie Rampone (great-granddaughter)
- Michael Dunbar, Tom Dunbar (brother)
- Johnny Duncan, Tom Duncan (brother)
- Billy Dunlop, Jimmy Miller (nephew), Will Gibson (brother-in-law of Miller)
- Jimmy Dunn Sr., Jimmy Dunn Jr. (son), Alex Harris (great-nephew)
- Gordon Durie, Scott Durie (son)

=== F ===
- Alex Ferguson, Martin Ferguson (brother), Darren Ferguson (son)
- Derek Ferguson, Barry Ferguson (brother), Lewis Ferguson (son), Kyle Ferguson (nephew)
- Bob Ferrier Sr., (England) Bob Ferrier Jr. (son)
- Robert Findlay, Tom Findlay (brother), (United States) William Findlay (son)
- Patrick Flannigan, David Flannigan (brother), Willie Callaghan (nephew), Tommy Callaghan (nephew / brother of Willie), Willie Callaghan Jr (great-nephew, son of Willie), Tommy Callaghan Jr (great-nephew, son of Tommy), Liam Callaghan (great-nephew, son of Willie Jr), Craig Johnston (cousin of Liam)
- Robert Fleck, John Fleck (nephew)
- Jim Fleeting, Julie Fleeting (daughter – also wife of Colin Stewart – below)
- Darren Fletcher, Tyler Fletcher (son), (England) Jack Fletcher (son)
- James Forrest, Alan Forrest (brother), Lisa Forrest (sister)
- Forrest (2): see Willoughby
- Campbell Forsyth, Cameron Burgess (grandson)

=== G ===
- Hughie Gallacher, Jackie Gallacher (son)
- Jim Gallacher, Paul Gallacher (son), Tony Gallacher (nephew)
- Pat Gallacher, John McPhail (nephew), Billy McPhail (nephew)
- (Ireland) Patsy Gallacher, Willie Gallacher (son), Tommy Gallacher (son), John Divers Sr. (nephew), Kevin Gallacher (grandson), John Divers Jr. (great-nephew), Amy Gallacher (great-granddaughter)
- Archie Gemmill, Scot Gemmill (son)
- Neilly Gibson, Willie Gibson (son), Neil Gibson (son), James Gibson (son)
- Alan Gilzean, Ian Gilzean (son)
- Ronnie Glavin, Tony Glavin (brother)
- (England) John Goodall, (Ireland) Archie Goodall (brother) (Note: The Goodall brothers were born to Scottish parents who moved to London then Belfast due to military appointments. The family lived in Kilmarnock, with both brothers playing professionally in England (mainly for Derby County) and for their birth nations internationally.)
- Lewis Goram, Andy Goram (Note: Was born in England, but represented Scotland internationally.) (son)
- Charlie Gough, Richard Gough (son)
- James Gourlay, Jimmy Gourlay (son) (Note: James Gourlay's descendants David Gourlay Sr. and David Gourlay Jr. were international lawn bowls champions)
- Donald Gow, John Gow (brother)
- Arthur Graham, Tommy Graham (brother), Jimmy Graham (brother)
- Johnny Graham, Willie Graham (brother)
- Peter Grant Sr., Peter Grant Jr. (son), Ray Grant (son)
- Suzanne Grant, Shelley Grant (twin sister), David Winters (husband), Robbie Winters (brother-in-law – brother of David), Don Cowie (brother-in-law – husband of Shelley)
- Eddie Gray, Frank Gray (brother), Stuart Gray (son), Andy Gray (nephew – son of Frank), (England) Archie Gray, (England) Harry Gray (grand-nephews – sons of Andy)
- Bryan Gunn, Angus Gunn (son)

=== H ===
- Dave Halliday, Billy Halliday (brother)
- Alexander Hamilton, James Hamilton (brother), (Chile) John Hamilton (brother), Gladstone Hamilton (brother)
- John Hansen, Alan Hansen (brother)
- Joshua Harris, Neil Harris (brother), John Harris (nephew – son of Neil)
- Kevin Hegarty, Paul Hegarty (brother), Ryan Hegarty (son)
- Colin Hendry, Callum Hendry (son)
- Sandy Herd, Alec Herd (brother), David Herd (nephew – son of Alec)
- Rocco Hickey-Fugaccia, Aaron Hickey (cousin)
- Sandy Higgins Sr, Sandy Higgins Jr (son)
- James Howie, David Howie (brother)
- John Hughes, Pat Hughes (brother), Billy Hughes (brother)
- John Hunter, Archie Hunter (brother), Andy Hunter (brother)

=== I ===
- Stewart Imlach, (England) Mike Imlach (son)

=== J ===
- Bob Jack, (England) David Jack (son), (England) Rollo Jack (son)
- Andrew Jackson, Jimmy Jackson (brother), (England) Andy Jackson (son), James Jackson (nephew / son of Jimmy), (England) Archie Jackson (nephew / son of Jimmy) (Note: The Australian cricketer Archie Jackson was also a family member (nephew/cousin respectively))
- Wattie Jackson, Alex Jackson (brother)
- Sammy Johnston, Allan Johnston (brother), Max Johnston (nephew, son of Allan).

=== K ===
- James Kelly, Frank Kelly (son), Bob Kelly (son), Willie Hughes (son-in-law), Michael Kelly (grandson), Kevin Kelly (grandson)
- Bob Kelso, James Kelso (brother), Tommy Kelso (nephew)
- Bobby Kennedy, Lorraine Kennedy (daughter)
- Shelley Kerr, Rhys McCabe (nephew)
- William Ker, George Ker (brother)
- George Key, William Key (brother)
- Alex King, John King (nephew)
- Jim Kirkland, Martha Thomas (grand-niece)

=== L ===
- Alex Lambie, (Note: They were not blood relatives: Lambie was married to the sister of the Brown brothers' mother.) (United States) Jim Brown (nephew), John Brown (nephew), (Note: John Brown's sons Peter and Gordon played international rugby union for Scotland) Tom Brown (nephew), (United States) George Brown (great-nephew, son of Jim)
- John Lambie, William Lambie (brother)
- Bobby Lennox, Gary Lennox (son)
- Archie Livingstone, George Livingstone (brother)
- Alec Logan, James Logan (brother), Tommy Logan (brother)
- Harry Low, Wilf Low (brother), Willie Low (nephew), Norman Low (nephew / Wilf's son) (Note: The reference states they were half-brothers, but Willie was the son of William, a much older brother of Wilf and Harry – whose own father was also named William.)

=== M ===
- Lou Macari, Mike Macari (son), (England) Paul Macari (son), Lewis Macari (grandson)
- Willie MacFadyen, Ian MacFadyen (son)
- Donald MacLaren, Ross MacLaren (brother), (Australia) Jamie Maclaren (son)
- Jimmy Mallan, Stevie Mallan Sr. (grandson), Stevie Mallan Jr. (great-grandson)
- (England) Tom Maley, Willie Maley (brother), Alex Maley (brother)
- (England) Gordon Marshall Sr., Gordon Marshall Jr. (son), Scott Marshall (son)
- John May, Hugh May (brother)
- Colin McAdam, Tom McAdam (brother)
- Jamie McAllister, Reuben McAllister (son)
- Paul McAneny, Maria McAneny (daughter)
- Tom McAnearney, Jim McAnearney (brother)
- Joe McBride Sr., Joe McBride Jr. (son)
- Andy McCall, Stuart McCall (son), Craig McCall (grandson – son of Stuart)
- Archie McCall, James McCall (brother)
- (Northern Ireland) Ali McCann, (Northern Ireland) Lewis McCann (brother) (Note: The McCann brothers were born in Scotland but chose to represent Northern Ireland internationally. Their brother Ross McCann is a Scottish international Rugby 7s player.)
- John McCartney, Willie McCartney (son)
- James McCloy, Peter McCloy (son)
- William McColl, Ian McColl (grandson)
- James McCrae, David McCrae (brother)
- Andrew McCreadie, Hugh McCreadie (brother)
- (United States) Charlie McCully, (United States) Henry McCully (brother) (Note: The McCullys emigrated from Scotland as teenagers; both were capped by the United States.)
- Robby McCrorie, Ross McCrorie (twin brother)
- Jock McDougall, Jimmy McDougall (brother)
- (Australia) Garry McDowall, (Note: Was born in Scotland, but represented Australia internationally.) Kenny McDowall (brother)
- John McGeady, (Republic of Ireland) Aiden McGeady (Note: Was born in Scotland, but represented the Republic of Ireland internationally.) (son)
- Darren McGeouch, Dylan McGeouch (brother)
- James McGhee, (United States) Bart McGhee (son), (United States) Jimmy McGhee (son)
- Jack McGinn, Stephen McGinn (grandson), John McGinn (grandson), Paul McGinn (grandson)
- Kevin McGlinchey, (New Zealand) Michael McGlinchey (son)
- Jimmy McGowan, Ally McGowan (brother)
- Danny McGrain, Tommy McGrain (brother)
- Arthur McInally, Tommy McInally (adopted brother)
- Jackie McInally, Alan McInally (son)
- Jim McInally, Anna Murray (niece)
- Hugh McIntyre, James McIntyre (brother)
- Daniel McKay, Barrie McKay (brother)
- Frank McKee, (Hong Kong) Jaimes McKee (grandson)
- Duncan McKenzie, Hamish MacKenzie (nephew)
- Angus McKinlay, Donald McKinlay (son)
- Ronnie McKinnon, Donnie McKinnon (twin brother)
- Hugh McLaughlin, Aaron Hickey (grand-nephew)
- David McLean, George McLean (brother)
- Stuart McLean, Steven McLean (son), (Northern Ireland) Brian McLean (Note: Was born in Scotland, capped by Scotland's under-17 side before switching allegiance to Northern Ireland.) (son)
- McLean [3]: see Yuille
- Stephen McManus, Kris Doolan (cousin)
- Jimmy McMenemy, John McMenemy (son), Frank McMenemy (son), Harry McMenemy (son)
- Jock McNab, David McNab (brother)
- Jackie McNamara Sr., Jackie McNamara Jr. (son)
- Willie McNaught, Ken McNaught (son)
- Henry McNeil, Peter McNeil (brother), Moses McNeil (brother)
- Malcolm McPhail, Bob McPhail (brother)
- McPhail [2]: see Gallacher
- James McPherson, John McPherson (brother), David McPherson (brother), Johnny McPherson (great-nephew – grandson of John)
- James Quar McPherson, Jim McPherson (son), Robert McPherson (son), (Germany) Edwin Dutton (son-in-law)
- Matt McQueen, Hugh McQueen (brother)
- Tom McQueen, Gordon McQueen (son)
- Francis McStay, Willie McStay Sr. (brother), Jimmy McStay (brother), Willie McStay Jr. (great-nephew), Paul McStay (great-nephew), Ray McStay (great-nephew), John McStay (cousin of the younger Willie, Paul and Ray) Chris McStay (son of Paul)
- Jock McTavish, Bob McTavish (brother), John McTavish (nephew)
- Lee Miller, Lennon Miller (son)
- William Miller, Adam Miller (brother), Tom Miller (brother), John Miller (brother)
- Willie Mills, Hugh Mills (brother)
- Jimmy Milne, (England) Gordon Milne (son)
- (Ireland) Bob Morrison, (Ireland) Tommy Morrison (brother) (Note: Bob Morrison was born in Greenock; the family then moved to Belfast where Tommy was born.)
- Bob Morton, Alan Morton (brother)
- Bobby Murdoch, Billy Murdoch (brother)

=== N ===
- Robert W. Neill, Quintin Neill (brother)
- Jimmy Nelson, (Wales) Tony Nelson (son)
- Joe Nibloe, (England) Jack Nibloe (son)

=== O ===
- Garry O'Connor, Josh O'Connor (son)
- Frank O'Donnell, Hugh O'Donnell (brother)
- Phil O'Donnell, Stephen O'Donnell (nephew), David Clarkson (nephew)
- Willie Ormond, Gibby Ormond (brother), (New Zealand) Bert Ormond (brother), (New Zealand) Ian Ormond (nephew, son of Bert), (New Zealand) Duncan Ormond (nephew, son of Bert), (New Zealand) Vicki Ormond (great-niece, daughter of Duncan)
- Tommy Orr, Neil Orr (son)
- Willie Orr, Johnny Orr (nephew)
- Jimmy Oswald, John Oswald (brother)

=== P ===
- Jimmy Parlane, Derek Parlane (son)
- Steven Pressley, Aaron Pressley (son)
- Keith Pritchett, (New Zealand) James Pritchett (son)
- Bob Pursell, Sr., Peter Pursell (brother), Bob Pursell, Jr. (nephew, son of Peter)

=== Q ===
- Nigel Quashie, (Wales) Brayden Clarke (son)
- Jimmy Quinn, Jimmy Quinn (grandson)

=== R ===
- Bill Raisbeck, Alex Raisbeck (brother), Andrew Raisbeck (brother), Luke Raisbeck (cousin)
- Jimmy Reid, Max Reid (brother), Davy Reid (brother), Jack Reid (brother), (Ireland) Willie Reid (brother) (Note: The Reid brothers were born in Ayrshire and raised in Northern Ireland, other than Willie who was born in Belfast so was eligible for Ireland, though he spent much of his career in Scotland.)
- (England) Andy Rhodes, (England) Steve Agnew (brother-in-law), Jordan Rhodes (son)
- Bruce Rioch, (England) Neil Rioch (brother), (England) Gregor Rioch (son), (England) Matty Holmes (nephew)
- John L. Ritchie, Duncan Ritchie (cousin)
- David Robertson, Mason Robertson (son)
- Dianne Robertson (née McLaren), Scott Robertson (son)
- Natalie Ross, Frank Ross (brother)

=== S ===
- Alex Scott, Jim Scott (brother)
- Robert Scott, Matthew Scott (brother)
- Willie Scott, Jocky Scott (son)
- Shankly: see Blyth
- Ricky Sharp, Graeme Sharp (brother)
- Jock Shaw, Davie Shaw (brother)
- Dave Shearer, Duncan Shearer (brother)
- Andrew Shinnie, Graeme Shinnie (brother)
- Jimmy Simpson, Ronnie Simpson (son)
- Leslie Skene, Clyde Skene (brother)
- Doug Smith, Dave Smith (brother), Hugh Smith (brother)
- James Smith, Robert Smith (brother)
- Jimmy Smith, Joe Smith (brother)
- Mattha Smith, Gordon Smith (grandson)
- Nicol Smith, Jimmy Smith (son)
- Peter Somers, Bill Somers (son), John Somers (son)
- John Souttar, (Australia) Harry Souttar (brother)
- Spencer: see Davies
- (United States) Archie Stark, (United States) Tommy Stark (brother) (Note: The Stark family emigrated from Glasgow to New Jersey.)
- John Stevenson, George Stevenson (brother)
- David Stewart, Andy Stewart (brother)
- Jim Stewart, Colin Stewart (son – also husband of Julie Fleeting – above)
- Sandy Stewart, Scott Stewart (son)
- Gordon Strachan, Gavin Strachan (son), Craig Strachan (son), Luke Strachan (grandson)
- David Steele, (England) David Shaw (grandson)
- Paul Sturrock, Blair Sturrock (son)

=== T ===
- Greg Taylor, Ally Taylor (brother)
- Mike Teasdale, Joseph Teasdale (son)
- Bobby Thomson, Hollie Thomson (daughter)
- Martin Tierney, (Malaysia) Fergus Tierney (son)
- Willie Toner, Kevin Toner (son)

=== V ===
- Jock Venters, Alex Venters (brother)

=== W ===
- Abraham Wales, Sr., Abraham Wales, Jr. (son), Hugh Wales (son)
- Bobby Walker, Alex Walker (brother), George Walker (nephew), Bobby Hogg (brother-in-law of George), (England) Tom Fenner (brother-in-law of George)
- Frank Walker, Jim Walker (brother), Willie Walker (brother)
- Tommy Walker, Steven Tweed (nephew)
- William Walker, Isaac Walker (brother)
- Alexander Watson Hutton, (Argentina) Arnold Watson Hutton (son)
- Philip Watson, Phil Watson (son)
- David Weir, (England) Jensen Weir (son)
- Eddie White, John White (brother), Tom White (brother)
- Willie White, Jock White (brother), Tom White (brother), James White (brother), Andrew Anderson (brother-in-law)
- Lee Wilkie, Jack Wilkie (son)
- Alex Willoughby, Jim Forrest (cousin)
- Andrew Wilson, David Wilson (brother), James Wilson (brother), Alec Wilson (brother)
- Andy Wilson, (England) Jimmy Wilson (son)
- David Wilson, George Wilson (brother)
- Hughie Wilson, (England) Jock Wilson (son)
- Robbie Winters, David Winters (brother – also husband of Suzanne Grant, above)
- Eddie Wolecki Black, Emma Black (wife)
- Jocky Wright, (England) Billy Wright (son), (England) Doug Wright (son)

=== Y ===
- Benny Yorston, Harry Yorston (nephew)
- Alex Young, Jason Young (son)
- William Yuille, Willie McLean (grandson), Jim McLean (grandson), Tommy McLean (grandson)

== See also ==
- List of professional sports families
- List of family relations in American football
  - List of second-generation National Football League players
- List of association football (soccer) families
  - List of African association football families
  - List of European association football families
    - List of English association football families
    - List of former Yugoslavia association football families
    - List of Spanish association football families
  - Category:Association football families
- List of Australian rules football families
- List of second-generation Major League Baseball players
- List of second-generation National Basketball Association players
- List of boxing families
- List of chess families
- List of International cricket families
- List of family relations in the National Hockey League
- List of family relations in rugby league
- List of international rugby union families
- List of professional wrestling families
