= 1990–91 Kilmarnock F.C. season =

Kilmarnock
1990–91 season
- Chairman: Bobby Fleeting
- Manager: Jim Fleeting (footballer)
- Scottish First Division: 5th
- Scottish Cup: 4R
- Scottish League Cup: 3R
- Scottish Challenge Cup: SF
- Top goalscorer: League: Bobby Williamson 14; All: John Sludden 15
- Highest home attendance: 9,802 (v Ayr United, 13 October)
- Lowest home attendance: 3,224 (v Forfar Athletic, 22 December)
- Average home league attendance: 4,934 (up 2446)

The 1990–91 season was Kilmarnock's 89th in Scottish League Competitions and marked their return to the Scottish First Division.

== Scottish First Division ==
=== League table ===
Pos	Team	Pld	W	D	L	GF	GA	GD	Pts
3	Dundee	39	22	8	9	59	33	+26	52
4	Partick Thistle	39	16	13	10	56	53	+3	45
5	Kilmarnock	39	15	13	11	58	48	+10	43
6	Hamilton Academical	39	16	10	13	50	41	+9	42
7	Raith Rovers	39	14	9	16	54	64	−10	37

Source: RSSSF and statto
Rules for classification: 1) points; 2) goal difference; 3) number of goals scored.

=== Match results ===
Match Day	Date	Opponent	H/A	Score	Kilmarnock scorer(s)	Attendance
1	25 August	Meadowbank Thistle	A	0–1		1,767
2	1 September	Airdrieonians	H	3–4	Burns 9', Stark 66', Sludden 83'	5,287
3	8 September	Hamilton Academical	A	1–3	Tait 6'	2,687
4	15 September	Falkirk	H	1–1	Spence 45'	4,629
5	18 September	Clydebank	A	3–1	Burns 9', Reilly 35', Sludden 36'	2,442
6	22 September	Greenock Morton	H	3–1	Stark 10', Watters 59', Sludden 86'	4,322
7	29 September	Dundee	A	1–1	Callaghan 58'	4,573
8	6 October	Brechin City	H	2–0	Callaghan 23', Sludden 61'	1,299
9	9 October	Raith Rovers	H	1–1	Watters 28'	3,953
10	13 October	Ayr United	H	3–1	Elliott 46', Callaghan 52', Burns 83'	9,802
11	20 October	Partick Thistle	A	0–2		4,600
12	27 October	Forfar Athletic	A	2–2	Sludden 25', Burns 43'	1,521
13	3 November	Clyde	H	2–1	Sludden 65', Tait 70'	3,973
14	10 November	Airdrieonians	A	0–2		4,400
15	17 November	Meadowbank Thistle	H	2–3	Reilly 25', Stark 38'	4,198
16	24 November	Raith Rovers	A	1–1	Burns 44'	2,260
17	1 December	Brechin City	H	2–1	Williamson 22', Sloan 80'	3,473
18	8 December	Dundee	H	2–1	Williamson 35', Tait 40'	4,558
19	15 December	Greenock Morton	A	0–3		2,724
20	22 December	Forfar Athletic	H	1–0	Williamson 90'	3,224
21	2 January	Ayr United	A	2–1	Burns 21', Sludden 44'	9,448
22	5 January	Partick Thistle	H	2–3	Flexney 14', Callaghan 40'	5,588
23	12 January	Hamilton Academical	H	1–0	Williamson 64'	4,767
24	19 January	Falkirk	A	1–1	Sludden 13'	6,749
25	2 February	Clydebank	H	3–0	Williamson 19', 26', 61'	4,169
26	16 February	Partick Thistle	H	1–0	Williamson 5'	6,073
27	26 February	Clyde	A	1–1	Williamson 16'	1,000
28	9 March	Greenock Morton	H	1–1	Williamson 41'	4,451
29	12 March	Forfar Athletic	A	1–1	Williamson 40'	977
30	16 March	Airdrieonians	A	0–2		5,000
31	23 March	Falkirk	H	1–1	Stark 12'	6,664
32	30 March	Hamilton Academical	H	1–0	Flexney 82'	4,449
33	6 April	Raith Rovers	A	2–1	Williamson 42', Campbell 58'	1,761
34	10 April	Meadowbank Thistle	A	8–1	Campbell 7', 13', Stark 11', Williamson 20', 26', Smith 42', Burns 52', 89'	1,107
35	13 April	Brechin City	H	2–2	Stark 14', Campbell 77'	4,543
36	20 April	Clydebank	A	0–0		2,005
37	27 April	Clyde	A	1–2	Jenkins 65'	1,700
38	4 May	Dundee	H	0–0		5,712
39	11 May	Ayr United	A	0–1		5,884

== Scottish League Cup ==
Round	Date	Opponent	H/A	Score	Kilmarnock scorer(s)	Attendance
R2	21 August	Clydebank	H	3–2	Spence 30', Stark 75', Callaghan 116'	4,777
R3	28 August	Rangers	A	0–1		32,671

== Scottish Cup ==
Round	Date	Opponent	H/A	Score	Kilmarnock scorer(s)	Attendance
R3	26 January	Arbroath	H	3–2	Sludden 20', 70', Burns 61'	2,941
R4	23 February	Dundee	A	0–2		7,195

== Scottish Challenge Cup ==
Match day	Date	Opponent	H/A	Score	Kilmarnock Scorer(s)	Attendance
R1	2 October	Stirling Albion	H	4–1	Burns 16', Sludden 56', 73', 79'	2,612
R2	16 October	Arbroath	H	3–1	Sludden 30', Elliott 35', Stark 71'	3,437
QF	23 October	East Fife	A	2–1	Sludden 35', Watters 84'	2,102
SF	30 October	Dundee	H	0–2		7,933

== See also ==
- List of Kilmarnock F.C. seasons
