= 1996–97 Livingston F.C. season =

Livingston
1996–97 season
- Manager: Jim Leishman
- Stadium: Almondvale Stadium
- Scottish Second Division: Third place
- Scottish Cup: Second round
- League Cup: First round
- Challenge Cup: First round
- Top goalscorer: Graham Harvey (15)
Home colours	Away colours

Season 1996-97 saw Livingston compete in the Scottish Second Division. They also competed in the Challenge Cup, League Cup and the Scottish Cup.

== Summary ==
In their first season in the Second Division having been promoted the previous season Livingston finished third. They reached the first round of the challenge cup, the first round of the League cup and the second round of the Scottish Cup.

== Results & fixtures ==
Win Draw Loss

=== Scottish Second Division ===
17 August 1996 1	Livingston	3–1	Queen of the South	Almondvale Stadium
	McMartin 17'; Duthie 40'; Harvey 45'		Flannigan 81'

24 August 1996 2	Stranraer	1–2	Livingston	Stair Park
	Young 68'		McLeod 8'; Harvey 90'

31 August 1996 3	Livingston	1–0	Hamilton Academical	Almondvale Stadium
	Harvey 36'

7 September 1996 4	Livingston	2–1	Brechin City	Almondvale Stadium
	Williamson 20'; Young 72'		Feroz 70'

14 September 1996 5	Dumbarton	2–4	Livingston	Boghead Park
	McKinnon 41'; Ward 65'		Harvey 9' (pen.), 45'; Young 31'; McLeod 71'

21 September 1996 6	Stenhousemuir	0–0	Livingston	Ochilview Park

28 September 1996 7	Livingston	2–1	Berwick Rangers	Almondvale Stadium
	Harvey 4' (pen.), 77'		Forrester 63'

5 October 1996 8	Livingston	0–0	Clyde	Almondvale Stadium

12 October 1996 9	Ayr United	1–0	Livingston	Somerset Park
	Connor 10'

19 October 1996 10	Queen of the South	2–2	Livingston	Palmerston Park
	Mallan 37'; Flannigan 83'		Young 16'; Duthie 70'

26 October 1996 11	Livingston	2–0	Stranraer	Almondvale Stadium
	Harvey 11'; Tierney 63'

2 November 1996 12	Livingston	5–0	Dumbarton	Almondvale Stadium
	Young 17'; Harvey 21', 34'; Duthie 54'; Alleyne 83'

9 November 1996 13	Brechin City	0–0	Livingston	Glebe Park

16 November 1996 14	Berwick Rangers	1–2	Livingston	Shielfield Park
	Fraser 79'		Callaghan 21', 26'

30 November 1996 15	Clyde	2–0	Livingston	Broadwood Stadium
	Matheson 22'; Annand 90'

7 December 1996 16	Livingston	2–1	Stenhousemuir	Almondvale Stadium
	Harvey 72'; Laidlaw 83'		Little 33'

14 December 1996 17	Livingston	1–0	Ayr United	Almondvale Stadium
	Harvey 2'

21 December 1996 18	Livingston	2–1	Queen of the South	Almondvale Stadium
	McMartin 23'; Duthie 37'		Flannigan 44'

1 January 1997 19	Livingston	2–2	Berwick Rangers	Almondvale Stadium
	Campbell 6'; Graham 32'		Forrester 19'; Walton 90'

11 January 1997 20	Stenhousemuir	1–3	Livingston	Ochilview Park
	Little 52' (pen.)		McLeod 18'; Harvey 45'; Campbell 75' (pen.)

18 January 1997 21	Livingston	0–0	Clyde	Almondvale Stadium

1 February 1997 22	Ayr United	1–0	Livingston	Somerset Park
	Kerrigan 69'

5 February 1997 23	Hamilton Academical	3–3	Livingston	Firhill Stadium
	McCormick 55'; Ritchie 74', 82'		Campbell 15'; Duthie 23', 81'

8 February 1997 24	Dumbarton	2–3	Livingston	Boghead Park
	Mooney 35'; McKinnon 62'		Duthie 16'; Harvey 74'; McLeod 77'

22 February 1997 25	Stranraer	1–1	Livingston	Stair Park
	Higgins 35'		Bailey 79'

26 February 1997 26	Livingston	2–3	Brechin City	Almondvale Stadium
	Harvey 14'; Bailey 36'		Feroz 23', 57'; Brown 67'

8 March 1997 27	Livingston	1–3	Stenhousemuir	Almondvale Stadium
	Bailey 87'		Little 35', 57'; Haddow 40'

15 March 1997 28	Berwick Rangers	1–1	Livingston	Shielfield Park
	Clegg 80'		Callaghan 85'

22 March 1997 29	Clyde	0–1	Livingston	Broadwood Stadium
			Bailey 71'

30 March 1997 30	Livingston	1–2	Hamilton Academical	Almondvale Stadium
	Bailey 2'		McIntosh 35' (pen.); Ritchie 42'

5 April 1997 31	Livingston	2–1	Ayr United	Almondvale Stadium
	McMartin 53'; Young 90'		Hood 27'

12 April 1997 32	Brechin City	1–0	Livingston	Glebe Park
	Christie 37'

19 April 1997 33	Livingston	1–2	Dumbarton	Almondvale Stadium
	McLeod 18'		Meechan 81'; Sharp 83'

26 April 1997 34	Queen of the South	1–2	Livingston	Palmerston Park
	Leslie 56' (pen.)		Bailey 60', 90'

3 May 1997 35	Livingston	3–0	Stranraer	Almondvale Stadium
	Bailey 26'; Laidlaw 59'; Forrest 78'

10 May 1997 36	Hamilton Academical	0–0	Livingston	Firhill Stadium

=== Scottish League Cup ===
3 August 1996 First round	Ayr United	5–2	Livingston	Somerset Park

=== Scottish Challenge Cup ===
10 August 1996 First round	Livingston	1–2	Inverness Caledonian Thistle	Almondvale Stadium

=== Scottish Cup ===
13 January 1997 Second round	Brechin City	2–1	Livingston	Glebe Park

== Statistics ==
=== League table ===
Pos	Team	Pld	W	D	L	GF	GA	GD	Pts	Promotion or relegation
1	Ayr United (C, P)	36	23	8	5	61	33	+28	77	Promotion to the First Division
2	Hamilton Academical (P)	36	22	8	6	75	28	+47	74	Promotion to the First Division
3	Livingston	36	18	10	8	56	38	+18	64	
4	Clyde	36	14	10	12	42	39	+3	52	
5	Queen of the South	36	13	8	15	55	57	−2	47	

Source: "1996-1997 Second Division - SPFL Archive". SPFL.
Rules for classification: 1) points; 2) goal difference; 3) number of goals scored.
(C) Champions; (P) Promoted
