= 1989–90 Kilmarnock F.C. season =

Kilmarnock
1989–90 season
- Chairman: Bob Lauchlan until December 1989 Bobby Fleeting from December 1989
- Manager: Jim Fleeting
- Scottish Second Division: 2nd
- Scottish Cup: 2R
- Scottish League Cup: 2R
- Top goalscorer: League: Willie Watters 23; All: Willie Watters 24
- Highest home attendance: 8,526 (v Cowdenbeath, 5 May)
- Lowest home attendance: 1,767 (v East Stirlingshire, 2 September)
- Average home league attendance: 3,257 (up 769)

The 1989–90 season was Kilmarnock's 88th in Scottish League Competitions. They were promoted back to the Scottish First Division after one season in the bottom tier after a 2–1 win against Cowdenbeath F.C. in the last match of the season.

The long running takeover saga ended when the Bobby Fleeting consortium took control of the club in December. The new board included former player Ronnie Hamilton and American millionairess Laurel Chadwick.

On the field, Killie shocked Scottish football by signing Tommy Burns despite the player having offers from 4 Premier League clubs.

== Scottish Second Division ==
=== League table ===
Pos	Team	Pld	W	D	L	GF	GA	GD	Pts	Promotion
1	Brechin City (C, P)	39	19	11	9	59	44	+15	49	Promotion to the First Division
2	Kilmarnock (P)	39	21	5	13	67	41	+26	47	Promotion to the First Division
3	Stirling Albion	39	20	7	12	73	50	+23	47	
4	Stenhousemuir	39	18	9	12	62	53	+9	45	
5	Berwick Rangers	39	18	5	16	66	57	+9	41	

Source: "1989-1990 Second Division - SPFL Archive". SPFL.
Rules for classification: 1) points; 2) goal difference; 3) number of goals scored.
(C) Champions; (P) Promoted

=== Match results ===
Match Day	Date	Opponent	H/A	Score	Kilmarnock scorer(s)	Attendance
1	12 August	Brechin City	H	0–2		2,342
2	19 August	Arbroath	A	1–1	Curran 1'	1,070
3	26 August	Queen's Park	A	0–1		1,946
4	2 September	East Stirlingshire	H	2–0	Watters 23', Montgomerie 47'	1,755
5	9 September	Cowdenbeath	H	0–0		1,804
6	16 September	Stenhousemuir	A	3–0	M.Thompson 47', 51', D.Thompson 75'	954
7	23 September	Berwick Rangers	H	2–0	Curran 7', M.Thompson 59'	1,975
8	30 September	Stirling Albion	A	1–0	Curran 3'	1,920
9	7 October	Montrose	A	1–0	Watters 74'	800
10	14 October	East Fife	H	1–0	Reilly 89'	2,456
11	21 October	Stranraer	A	0–1		2,500
12	28 October	Dumbarton	H	3–0	Watters 60', 65', Tait 89'	2,867
13	4 November	Queen of the South	H	2–0	Reilly 21', D.Thompson 69'	2,938
14	11 November	East Stirlingshire	A	1–2	McCabe 70'	1,375
15	18 November	Stirling Albion	H	1–2	Tait 89'	2,473
16	25 November	Berwick Rangers	A	2–3	Curran 80', Marshall 85'	784
17	2 December	Montrose	H	1–1	McFarlane 64'	2,624
18	23 December	Arbroath	H	3–0	Watters 49', 74', 81'	3,336
19	26 December	Brechin City	A	1–3	Burns 42'	1,200
20	2 January	Queen's Park	H	2–0	Watters 39', Callaghan 81'	4,843
21	10 January	East Fife	A	2–4	Watters 6', Burns 82'	1,109
22	13 January	Cowdenbeath	A	1–2	Reilly 89'	981
23	20 January	Stenhousemuir	H	2–0	Watters 7', Montgomerie 82'	2,777
24	27 January	Stranraer	H	0–1		3,550
25	17 February	Arbroath	A	4–2	Callaghan 30', Tait 46', Sludden 69', Watters 81'	891
26	24 February	Berwick Rangers	A	4–1	Watters 28', 72', 82', Sludden 69'	992
27	3 March	East Stirlingshire	H	2–0	Burns 32', Reilly 83'	2,747
28	6 March	Stirling Albion	H	1–0	Watters 40'	3,369
29	10 March	Queen's Park	H	3–0	Watters 31', 90', Montgomerie 43'	3,767
30	13 March	Queen of the South	A	1–2	Flexney 85'	2,058
31	17 March	Stenhousemuir	A	1–2	Sludden 89'	1,717
32	24 March	Dumbarton	A	2–0	Sludden 62', Tait 84'	1,609
33	31 March	Brechin City	H	2–2	Tait 59', Watters 79'	4,767
34	3 April	Dumbarton	A	3–1	Sludden 9', Watters 28', 55'	1,475
35	7 April	East Fife	H	2–1	Porteous 84', Tait 89'	3,266
36	14 April	Stranraer	A	1–2	Watters 59'	2,410
37	21 April	Queen of the South	H	4–1	Watters 4', Sludden 36', McArthur 66', MacKinnon 77'	3,362
38	28 April	Montrose	A	3–1	Sludden 9', Watters 59', MacKay 74' o.g.	1,597
39	5 May	Cowdenbeath	H	2–1	Flexney 5', MacKinnon 81' pen.	8,526

== Scottish League Cup ==
Round	Date	Opponent	H/A	Score	Kilmarnock scorer(s)	Attendance
R2	15 August	Motherwell	H	1–4	D.Thompson 71'	3,903

== Scottish Cup ==
Round	Date	Opponent	H/A	Score	Kilmarnock scorer(s)	Attendance
R2	30 December	Stranraer	A	1–1	Watters 50'	2,941
R2R	6 January	Stranraer	H	0–0(AET, lost 3–4 on pens)		5,033

== See also ==
- List of Kilmarnock F.C. seasons
