= List of Livingston F.C. players =

This is a list of footballers notable for their contributions to Livingston F.C. since their change from Meadowbank Thistle in 1995, players who played under Meadowbank Thistle and continued to after the change are included. It generally includes only players who made more than 100 league appearances for the club, but some players with fewer than 100 appearances are also included. This includes players who represented their national team while with the club, and players who have set a club record, such as most appearances, most goals or biggest transfer fee.

== Notable players ==
As of 22:18, 22 February 2024 (UTC)

Players who represented their country while at the club.
Club record holder.

Bold type indicates that the player currently plays for the club.
Italic type indicates that the player represented both Meadowbank Thistle and Livingston.

Name	Nationality	Position (Note: For a full description of positions see Association football positions.)	Livingston career	League appearances	League goals	Notes
Marvin Andrews	Trinidad and Tobago	DF	2000–2004	117	7	
Lee Bailey	Scotland	FW	1992–1998	170	41	(Note: 101 apps and 24 goals for Meadowbank are included.)
Craig Barr	Scotland	DF	2009–2014	100	8	
David Bingham	Scotland	FW	1998–2003	164	50	
Raffaele De Vita	Italy	FW	2008–2011; 2016–2021	125	28	
Nicky Devlin	Scotland	DF	2019–2023	122	6	
Mark Duthie	Scotland	DF	1991–1998	136	15	(Note: 57 apps 4 goals for Meadowbank are included.)
Lyndon Dykes	Scotland	FW	2019–2020	28	11	(Note: Highest transfer fee received by the club, £2 million.) (Note: Highest transfer fee paid by the club, by nature of a sell-on clause, £200,000.)
David Fernández	Spain	MF	2001–2002; 2003–2004	68	11	(Note: Highest transfer fee received by the club at the time, £1 million.)
Liam Fox	Scotland	MF	2006–2013	185	22	
Derek Fleming	Scotland	DF	1992–1995; 1997–1998; 1998–2001	139	15	(Note: 49 apps 3 goals for Meadowbank are included.)
Declan Gallagher	Scotland	DF	2014–2016; 2017–2019	135	5	
Tommy Graham	Scotland	DF	1990–1998	115	8	(Note: 69 apps 3 goals for Meadowbank are included.)
Craig Halkett	Scotland	DF	2016–2019	117	16	
Joe Hamill	Scotland	MF	2006–2011	102	2	
**Jason Holt**	Scotland	MF	2020–	128	2	
Wes Hoolahan	Republic of Ireland	MF	2006–2007	16	0	(Note: Highest transfer fee paid by the club at the time, £100,000.)
Keaghan Jacobs	South Africa	MF	2007–2015; 2017–2022	268	23	
Kyle Jacobs	South Africa	MF	2009–2013; 2014–2015	144	10	
Alan Lithgow	Scotland	DF	2016–2021	113	10	
Ian Little	Scotland	MF	1990–1995; 1998–2000	193	34	(Note: 175 apps 33 goals for Meadowbank are included.)
Jackson Longridge	Scotland	DF	2015–2018; 2021–2023	116	8	
Stuart Lovell	Australia	MF	2001–2005	87	6	
David MacKay	Scotland	MF	2005–2009	132	16	
Roddy McKenzie	Scotland	GK	2003–2006; 2008–2010	156	0	
Gordon McLeod	Scotland	MF	1992–1998	157	26	(Note: 94 apps 13 goals for Meadowbank are included.)
Grant McMartin	Scotland	MF	1995–1999	110	6	
Marc McNulty	Scotland	FW	2009–2014	105	37	
James McPake	Scotland	MF	2003–2009	100	6	
Danny Mullen	Scotland	FW	2012–2018	141	33	
Burton O'Brien	Scotland	MF	2002–2005; 2012–2015	180	15	
**Scott Pittman**	Scotland	MF	2015–	296	36	(Note: Club record appearance holder.)
Rubio	Spain	DF	2001–2005	123	6	
Jason Talbot	England	DF	2008–2015	178	4	
Grant Tierney	Scotland	DF	1985–1988; 1996–1997	170	13	(Note: 132 apps 10 goals for Meadowbank are included.)
Paul Watson	Scotland	FW	2009–2013	109	6	
Stewart Williamson	Scotland	DF	1988–1998	300	10	(Note: 207 apps and 7 goals for Meadowbank are included.)
Barry Wilson	Scotland	MF	2000–2004	101	25	
Jason Young	Scotland	FW	1991–1993; 1994–1998	136	31	(Note: 41 apps 4 goals for Meadowbank are included.)

== Key to positions ==
- GK — Goalkeeper
- DF — Defender
- MF — Midfielder
- FW — Forward
