= Abraham Wales =

Abraham Wales is the name of:

- Abraham Wales (footballer, born 1874)
- Abraham Wales (footballer, born 1907)
