= 1982–83 Scottish Cup =

Tournament details
- Country: Scotland

Final positions
- Champions: Aberdeen
- Runners-up: Rangers

The 1982–83 Scottish Cup was the 98th staging of Scotland's most prestigious football knockout competition. The Cup was won by Aberdeen, who defeated Rangers in the final.

== First round ==
Matches were played on 11 December 1982, with the postponed games played a week later.

11 December 1982	Brechin City	2–0	Cowdenbeath
	Campbell (?)	Report		Referee: I.R Cathcart

11 December 1982	Meadowbank Thistle	1–2	East Stirlingshire
	Boyd 1'	Report	Kellas (pen.); Bremner	Referee: D.M Calloway

11 December 1982	Selkirk	0–2	Brora Rangers	Selkirk
		Report	Hamilton 10'; McAskill	Stadium: Yarrow Park; Referee: W. McLeish

18 December 1982	Peterhead	0–5	Forfar Athletic
		Report	Gallacher 5'; McDonald 6', 55'; Clark 72'; Lorimer 89'	Referee: A. Ray

18 December 1982	Vale of Leithen	0–0	Stranraer	Innerleithen
		Report		Stadium: Victoria Park; Referee: M. Delaney

18 December 1982	Stirling Albion	1–0	East Stirlingshire
	Colquhoun	Report		Referee: D.D. Hope

=== Replay ===
The replay was held on 20 December 1982.

20 December 1982	Stranraer	2–0	Vale of Leithen	Stranraer
	Bryce 56'; Dolan 61'	Report

== Second round ==
Home team	Score	Away team
Albion Rovers	1 – 0	Stranraer
Berwick Rangers	2 – 0	Stirling Albion
Brora Rangers	0 – 0	Montrose
East Fife	1 – 0	Brechin City
Elgin City	5 – 2	Gala Fairydean
Forfar Athletic	3 – 0	Inverness Caledonian
Queen of the South	3 – 0	Hawick Royal Albert
Stenhousemuir	1 – 0	Arbroath

=== Replay ===
Home team	Score	Away team
Montrose	1 – 1	Brora Rangers

==== Second Replay ====
Home team	Score	Away team
Brora Rangers	5 – 2	Montrose

== Third round ==
Home team	Score	Away team
Hamilton Academical	0 – 1	St Johnstone
Ayr United	1 – 2	Albion Rovers
Clyde	0 – 0	Motherwell
Clydebank	0 – 3	Celtic
Dumbarton	0 – 1	Airdrieonians
Dundee	2 – 1	Brora Rangers
Dunfermline Athletic	5 – 0	Elgin City
East Fife	1 – 0	Raith Rovers
Falkirk	0 – 2	Rangers
Forfar Athletic	2 – 1	Berwick Rangers
Hibernian	1 – 4	Aberdeen
Partick Thistle	1 – 1	Kilmarnock
Queen of the South	1 – 1	Hearts
Queen's Park	4 – 1	Stenhousemuir
St Mirren	1 – 0	Dundee United
Alloa Athletic	1 – 2	Greenock Morton

=== Replays ===
Home team	Score	Away team
Hearts	1 – 0	Queen of the South
Kilmarnock	0 – 0	Partick Thistle
Motherwell	3 – 4	Clyde

==== Second Replay ====
Home team	Score	Away team
Partick Thistle	2 – 2	Kilmarnock

===== Third Replay =====
Home team	Score	Away team
Kilmarnock	0 – 1	Partick Thistle

== Fourth round ==
19 February 1983	Hearts	2–1	East Fife	Edinburgh
	MacDonald 40'; O'Connor	Report	Caithness 23'	Stadium: Tynecastle Park; Attendance: 9,336; Referee: Kenny Hope

19 February 1983	Aberdeen	1–0	Dundee	Aberdeen
	Simpson 6'	Report		Stadium: Pittodrie Stadium; Referee: H Alexander

19 February 1983	Albion Rovers	0–3	Airdrieonians	Coatbridge
		Report	Millar; Gordon; Walker	Stadium: Cliftonhill; Referee: Andrew Waddell

19 February 1983	Celtic	3–0	Dunfermline Athletic	Glasgow
	McGarvey 66', 79'; McCluskey	Report		Stadium: Celtic Park; Referee: George Smith

19 February 1983	Greenock Morton	0–2	St Mirren	Greenock
		Report	McDougall 11', 85'	Stadium: Cappielow Park; Referee: Brian McGinlay

19 February 1983	Partick Thistle	2–2	Clyde	Glasgow
	Johnston; Flexney (o.g.)	Report	Masterton; Flexney	Stadium: Firhill Stadium; Referee: Jim Renton

19 February 1983	Queen’s Park	1–0	St Johnstone	Glasgow
	Crawley 15'	Report		Stadium: Hampden Park; Referee: A. McGunnigle

19 February 1983	Rangers	2–1	Forfar Athletic	Glasgow
	MacDonald 59' 78'	Report	MacDonald 41'	Stadium: Ibrox Park; Referee: J. Duncan

=== Replay ===
The match was abandoned after 103 minutes due to a floodlight failure.

23 February 1983	Clyde	1–1 (Abandoned)	Partick Thistle	Rutherglen
	Sinclair 29'	Report	Doyle 26'	Stadium: Shawfield Stadium; Referee: Jim Renton

==== Second Replay ====
28 February 1983	Clyde	0–6	Partick Thistle	Rutherglen
		Report	Whittaker 5'; Johnston 18', 37', 83'; Park 40', 74'	Stadium: Shawfield Stadium; Referee: Jim Renton

== Quarter-finals ==
12 March 1983	Airdrieonians	0–5	St Mirren	Airdrie
		Report	Stark 3' (?); McAvennie 7'; Scanlon (? pen)	Stadium: Broomfield Park; Referee: Bob Valentine

12 March 1983	Celtic	4–1	Hearts	Glasgow
	MacLeod 12'; McGarvey 54'; Nicholas 67', 82'	Report	MacDonald 60'	Stadium: Celtic Park; Referee: Brian McGinlay

12 March 1983	Partick Thistle	1–2	Aberdeen	Glasgow
	McDonald 64'	Report	Cooper 4'; Weir 90'	Stadium: Firhill Stadium; Referee: George Smith

12 March 1983	Queen’s Park	1–2	Rangers	Glasgow
	Gilmour 61' (pen.)	Report	Dalziel 15'; Cooper 43'	Stadium: Hampden Park; Referee: A. Ferguson

== Semi-finals ==
16 April 1983

Aberdeen	1–0	Celtic
Weir 65'	Report

Hampden Park, Glasgow
Attendance: 51,152
Referee: Alan Ferguson

16 April 1983

Rangers	1–1	St Mirren
Clark 72'	Report	Paterson 84' (o.g.)

Celtic Park, Glasgow
Attendance: 31,102
Referee: Bob Valentine

=== Replay ===
19 April 1983

Rangers	1–0 (a.e.t.)	St Mirren
Clark 118'	Report

Hampden Park, Glasgow
Attendance: 25,125
Referee: Brian McGinlay

== Final ==
21 May 1983

Aberdeen	1–0 (a.e.t.)	Rangers
Black 116'	Report

Hampden Park, Glasgow
Attendance: 62,970
Referee: David Syme
