= Peter Brown (rugby union) =

Scotland international rugby union player (1941–2025)

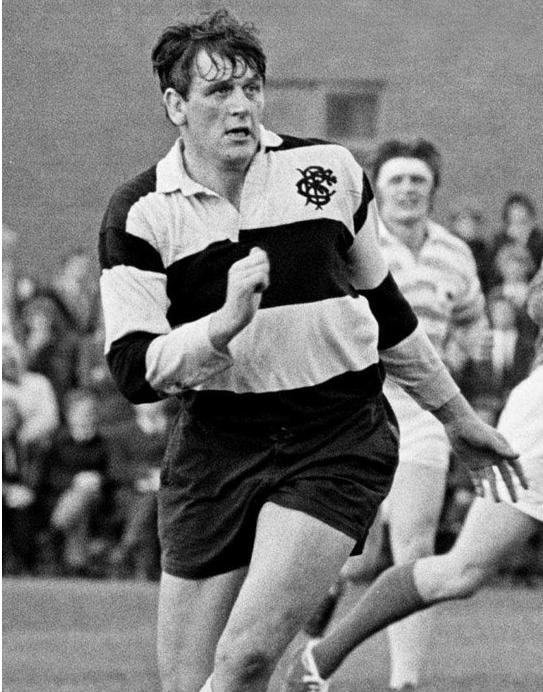
- Born: Peter Currie Brown; 16 December 1941 Troon, Scotland
- Died: 12 January 2025 (aged 83)

Rugby union career
- Position: No. 8
Amateur team(s)
Years	Team	Apps	(Points)
- West of Scotland
–	Gala		
Provincial / State sides
Years	Team	Apps	(Points)
- Glasgow District
International career
Years	Team	Apps	(Points)
1964–73	Scotland	27	(65)

Peter Brown (16 December 1941 – 12 January 2025) was a Scotland international rugby union player. He played No. 8 and Lock.

== Rugby Union career ==
=== Amateur career ===
Brown played for West of Scotland and Gala.

Brown was dubbed "the man on the coathanger" in his playing days because of his unusually square shoulders inherited from his maternal grandmother's side of the family. He kicked many goals which is very unusual for a forward.

=== Provincial career ===
Brown played for Glasgow District.

=== International career ===
Brown captained Scotland 10 times in his 27 internationals (1964–73). He is unique in captaining Scotland to 3 victories over England and his 67 international points making him Scotland's all-time highest scoring rugby forward.

=== Administrative career ===
Brown was an independent member of Scottish Rugby's discipline panel and acted as a match and discipline commissioner for both the RBS Six Nations and the Heineken European Cup.

== Business career ==
Brown was chairman of the Scottish Building Society from 1993 to 2003. From 1975 till 2004 he was senior partner in Hogg Thorburn, chartered accountants, in Galashiels and was a non-executive director with Edinburgh Risk Management (General) Limited, insurance brokers.

Retired from chartered accountancy, a public speaker, he taught public speaking and meeting presentation skills. In his involvement as a Trustee with the Scottish Borders employment charity WORKS+ mentors young adults in the basics of performance at interview. In addition he was a photographer, and in 2014 he published a book of the Muirfield members and their guests at the 2013 Open.

== Personal life and death ==
Brown was the elder brother of Gordon Brown, the son of footballer John Brown, and the nephew of footballers Tom and Jim Brown.

Peter Brown died after a long illness on 12 January 2025, at the age of 83.
