= David Elliott =

David or Dave Elliott may refer to:

- Dave Elliott (footballer, born 1945), English football player and manager
- Dave Elliott (footballer, born 1968), Scottish footballer
- Dave Elliott (American football) (born 1952), American football coach and former player
- David Elliott (children's author) (born 1947), American author of children's books
- David Elliott (college president) (1787–1874), president of Washington College, 1830–1831
- David Elliott (curator) (born 1949), British-born art gallery and museum curator
- David Elliott (musician), publisher, and founder of York House Recordings
- David Elliott (palaeontologist) (born 1957), Australian palaeontologist
- David Elliott (poet) (1923–1999), Canadian poet
- David Elliott (politician) (born 1970), Australian member of the New South Wales Legislative Assembly
- David Elliott (professor), professor of technology policy at the Open University
- David Elliott (diplomat) (1930–2023), British diplomat
- David J. Elliott (born 1948), music education philosopher
- David James Elliott (born 1960), actor

== See also ==
- David Elliot (disambiguation)
- David Elliot Cohen (born 1955), American editor and publisher
