= Alex Lambie =

Scottish footballer

Personal information
- Full name: Alexander Lambie
- Date of birth: 15 April 1897
- Place of birth: Troon, Scotland
- Date of death: 26 February 1963 (aged 65)
- Place of death: Prestwick, Scotland
- Height: 6 ft 2 in (1.88 m)
- Position: Centre half

Senior career*
Years	Team	Apps	(Gls)
–	Dreghorn Juniors		
1919–1920	Kilmarnock	1	(0)
1920–1921	Troon Athletic		
1921–1931	Partick Thistle	264	(15)
1931	Chester	1	(0)
1931–1934	Swindon Town	83	(1)
1934	Lovell's Athletic		
1934	Distillery		

International career
1928	Scottish League XI	1	(0)
- * Club domestic league appearances and goals

Alexander Lambie (15 April 1897 – 26 February 1963) was a Scottish footballer who played as a centre half.

== Career ==
=== Club ===
Although he began his career with Ayrshire teams including Kilmarnock, Lambie featured primarily for Glasgow club Partick Thistle where he spent a decade (all in the top division), making 325 appearances for the Jags in all competitions and scoring 17 goals, having been brought in during 1921 as a replacement for Willie Hamilton, the regular of the past decade who had died of tuberculosis.

He played in the 1930 Scottish Cup Final which Partick lost to Rangers after a replay, but did manage to claim winner's medals in the Glasgow Merchants Charity Cup in 1927 and the one-off Glasgow Dental Hospital Cup in 1928, both against the same opponents.

After he moved on from Partick Thistle in 1931, a spell at Chester lasting just a few weeks was followed by three seasons as a regular at Swindon Town, and then further brief period in Wales with Lovell's Athletic and Ireland with Distillery before retiring.

=== International ===
While playing for Partick Thistle, Lambie was selected once for the Scottish Football League XI against the English Football League XI in 1928, and took part in what proved to be the last Home Scots v Anglo-Scots international trial match in the same year, although this did not lead to a full cap for Scotland. He also played in two editions of the Glasgow Football Association's annual challenge match against Sheffield.

== Personal life ==
His nephews (Note: They were not blood relatives: Lambie's wife and the Brown brothers' mother were sisters.) Jim, Jock and Tom Brown were all footballers, and their sons also became sportsmen.
