= Patrick Flannigan =

Scottish footballer (1909–1987)

Personal information
- Date of birth: 4 August 1909
- Place of birth: Cowdenbeath, Scotland
- Date of death: 22 September 1987 (aged 78)
- Place of death: New York City, United States
- Position: Defender

Youth career
- Kelty Rangers

Senior career*
Years	Team	Apps	(Gls)
1926–1929	Cowdenbeath	21	(1)
1926	→ Lochgelly United (loan)		
1929–1930	Liverpool	0	(0)
1929–1930	→ Bradford City (loan)	1	(0)
1930–1933	New York Giants	63	(2)
1933	Rosyth Dockyard		
- * Club domestic league appearances and goals

Patrick G. Flannigan (4 August 1909 – 22 September 1987) was a Scottish professional footballer who played as a defender.

== Career ==
Born in Cowdenbeath, Flannigan played for Kelty Rangers, Cowdenbeath, Lochgelly United, Liverpool, Bradford City, New York Giants and Rosyth Dockyard.

For Bradford City he made one appearance in the Football League. In the United States, he won the American Soccer League championship in 1931 (Spring section and overall title).

His brother was fellow player David Flannigan; their sister Ellen married William Callaghan, several of whose descendents (Willie, Tommy, Willie Jr, Tommy Jr and Liam) also became footballers.

== Sources ==
- Frost, Terry (1988). Bradford City A Complete Record 1903-1988. Breedon Books Sport. ISBN 0-907969-38-0.
