= Richard Sharp =

Richard Sharp may refer to:

- Richard Sharp (BBC chairman) (born 1956), English banker and former BBC chairman
- Richard Sharp (executive) (1947–2014), American business and retail executive
- Richard Sharp (footballer) (born 1956), Scottish footballer
- Richard Sharp (politician) (1759–1835), British hat-maker, banker, merchant, poet, critic, Member of Parliament, and conversationalist
- Richard Sharp (priest) (1916–1982), British Anglican priest, Archdeacon of Dorset
- Richard Sharp (rugby union) (1938–2025), English rugby player and cricketer
- Richard Hey Sharp (1793–1853), English architect

== See also ==
- Richard Sharpe (disambiguation)
