= Hugh Wales =

Scottish footballer

Personal information
- Full name: Hugh Morrison Wales
- Date of birth: 6 May 1910
- Place of birth: Kilwinning, Scotland
- Date of death: 12 April 1995 (aged 84)
- Place of death: Calgary, Canada
- Height: 1.75 m (5 ft 9 in)
- Position: Right half

Senior career*
Years	Team	Apps	(Gls)
- Kilwinning Rangers
1929–1946	Motherwell	317	(15)
- → Charlton Athletic (war guest)
- → Chelsea (war guest)
- → Luton Town (war guest)
- Elgin City

International career
1933	Scotland	1	(0)
- * Club domestic league appearances and goals

Hugh Morrison Wales (6 May 1910 – 12 April 1995) was a Scottish footballer who played as a right half.

== Career ==
Born in Kilwinning, Wales played club football for Motherwell, (winning the Scottish Football League title in 1931–32 and playing in three Scottish Cup finals) and made one appearance for Scotland in 1933. He also guested during World War II for a number of teams, including Charlton Athletic, Chelsea and Luton Town. He later played for Elgin City. During the War he served with the Royal Artillery and was selected for the Army's football team.

He later emigrated to Canada.

His father and elder brother, both named Abraham Wales and inside forwards by position, were also footballers, although not as successful as Hugh.
