= William Findlay (soccer) =

American soccer player

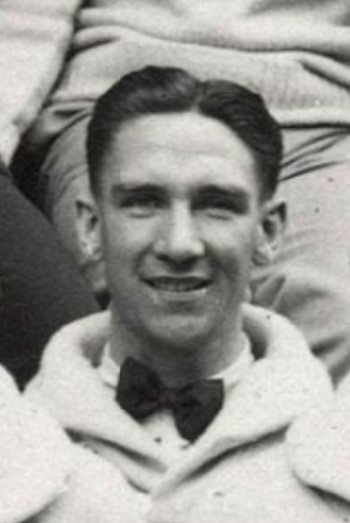
- William Findlay in 1928

Personal information
- Date of birth: January 15, 1904
- Place of birth: Kilmarnock, Scotland
- Date of death: January 21, 1981 (aged 77)
- Place of death: Augusta, Georgia, United States
- Position: Wing forward

Senior career*
| Years | Team | Apps | (Gls) |
| 1921–1923 | Third Lanark | 47 | (1) |
| 1924–1928 | Galicia S.C. | | |
| 1928–1929 | New York Nationals | 8 | (2) |
| 1930 | Brooklyn Wanderers | 3 | (0) |

International career
| 1924–1928 | United States | 4 | (0) |
- * Club domestic league appearances and goals

William Findlay (January 15, 1904 – January 21, 1981) was a soccer player who played as a wing forward. Born in Scotland, he earned four caps with the United States national team between 1924 and 1928. He also spent two seasons playing in the American Soccer League.

== Olympic teams ==
In 1924, Findlay was selected to the U.S. soccer team which competed in the 1924 Summer Olympics. He played in both U.S. games, a win over Estonia followed by a second round loss to Uruguay. Findlay did not play with the U.S. again until the 1928 Summer Olympics. At that tournament, the U.S. lost its first game to Argentina. Following its elimination from the Olympics, the U.S. played one exhibition game, a 3–3 tie with Poland.

== Club career ==
Findlay returned to Scotland as a teenager to play for Third Lanark of the Scottish Football League between 1921 and early 1923 (there were other players of the same name active at the time, including another at Third Lanark from summer 1923, but they do not appear to have coincided). At the time of his international selection in both 1924 and in 1928, he was playing for Galicia S.C. Following the Olympics, he signed with the New York Nationals of the American Soccer League. He also spent the 1930 fall season with the Brooklyn Wanderers.

== Personal life ==
William's family emigrated to the United States from Scotland in around 1914, when he was 10 years old. His father was Scottish international soccer player Robert Findlay, and his uncle Tom Findlay was also a professional; the brothers played together for Kilmarnock, Motherwell and Port Glasgow Athletic during their careers.

== See also ==
- List of Scottish football families
- List of United States men's international soccer players born outside the United States
