= George Livingstone =

Scottish footballer (1876–1950)

George Livingston
Personal information
- Full name: George Turner Livingston (Note: ScotlandsPeople spells the surname Livingston in both the birth and death entries.)
- Date of birth: 5 May 1876
- Place of birth: Dumbarton, Scotland
- Date of death: 15 January 1950 (aged 73)
- Place of death: Helensburgh, Scotland
- Positions: Inside forward; wing half

Youth career
- 1892–1893: Sinclair Swifts
- 1893–1894: Artizan Thistle

Senior career*
Years	Team	Apps	(Gls)
1894–1895	Parkhead		
1895–1896	Dumbarton	0	(0)
1896–1900	Hearts	50	(26)
1900–1901	Sunderland	30	(12)
1901–1902	Celtic	17	(4)
1902–1903	Liverpool	31	(4)
1903–1906	Manchester City	81	(19)
1906–1909	Rangers	47	(20)
1909–1915	Manchester United	43	(4)
1919	Dumbarton	1	(0)
Total		300	(89)

International career
1906–1907	Scotland	2	(0)
1907	Scottish League XI	1	(0)

Managerial career
- 1911–1915: Manchester United Reserves (player-manager)
- 1919–1920: Dumbarton
- * Club domestic league appearances and goals

George Turner Livingston (5 May 1876 – 15 January 1950) was a Scottish footballer. He played for several prominent clubs for a few years apiece, including Heart of Midlothian, Celtic and Rangers in Scotland, and Sunderland, Liverpool, Manchester City and Manchester United in England. Livingstone was capped twice for the Scotland national team; his regular position was at inside forward.

== Career ==
Livingstone was born in Dumbarton and started his career with local team Sinclair Swifts. He then moved to Artizan Thistle and Parkhead, before moving to Heart of Midlothian in the Scottish Football League, being part of the squad that won the competition in his first season, 1896–97, though he only played in four of the matches. He made 59 SFL and Scottish Cup appearances for the Edinburgh club, with 29 goals scored. In 1900, he joined Sunderland, but he only played there for a season (making 31 Football League and FA Cup appearances and scoring 12 goals – the club were league runners-up) before moving to Celtic, where in his one season he made 23 SFL and Scottish Cup appearances and scored seven goals as they finished as runners-up in both the league and cup.

In 1902, he moved back to England, signing for Liverpool (32 appearances, four goals) and then switched to Manchester City in 1903. He made 88 appearances for City, scoring 20 goals as the club won the 1904 FA Cup Final and were runners-up in the League in the same season.

He returned to Scotland in 1906, playing for Rangers for two seasons and part of a third without winning a major trophy (53 appearances, 23 goals) before transferring to Manchester United in early 1909. He helped United win the 1910–11 Football League title (10 appearances in that campaign, from 46 and 3 goals overall) before retiring in 1914.

He later served as manager of hometown club Dumbarton from early 1919 to late 1920 (also making one final league appearance as a player) and worked under Bill Struth at Rangers as the first team trainer.

He is the only footballer to date that has played (and scored) for both sides of the Old Firm and for Manchester's two biggest rivals.

== Personal life ==
Livingstone's older brother Archie was also a professional footballer. He served as a private in the Royal Army Medical Corps during the First World War.

== Honours ==
Manchester City

- FA Cup: 1903–04

Manchester United

- Football League First Division: 1910–11

== See also ==
- List of Scottish football families
- Played for Celtic and Rangers
