= James Brandon (footballer) =

Scottish footballer (1865–1942)

Personal information
- Full name: James Brandon
- Date of birth: 1865
- Place of birth: Kilbirnie, Scotland
- Date of death: 1942 (aged 76–77)
- Place of death: Dunfermline, Scotland
- Position: Centre forward

Senior career*
Years	Team	Apps	(Gls)
1886	Port Glasgow Athletic	0	(0)
- St Mirren
- Port Glasgow Athletic
1890	Preston North End	8	(3)
- The Wednesday
- Chesterfield Town
1892	Bootle	8	(5)
- * Club domestic league appearances and goals

James Brandon (1865 – 1942) was a Scottish footballer who played in the Football League for Bootle and Preston North End.

He had several relatives who played the game: brothers Tom (later capped for Scotland) and Bob were teammates in his early career at St Mirren, cousin Harry won the FA Cup with The Wednesday (where all four men played to some extent) in 1896, and nephew Tom played for Hull City among other clubs.
