= Harry Brandon (footballer) =

Scottish footballer (1870–1935)

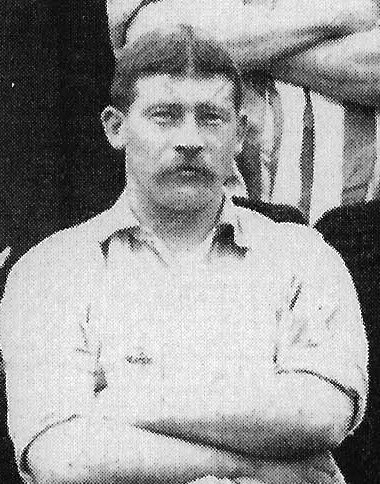

Personal information
- Full name: Henry Brandon
- Date of birth: 26 March 1870
- Place of birth: Kilbirnie, Scotland
- Date of death: 1935 (aged 64–65)
- Place of death: Rotherham, England
- Position: Wing half

Senior career*
Years	Team	Apps	(Gls)
1887–1888	Haywood Wanderers		
1888–1889	St Mirren		
1889–1890	Clyde		
1890–1898	The Wednesday	147	(15)
1898	Chesterfield Town		
Total		147	(15)

International career
1891	Football Alliance XI	1	(0)
- * Club domestic league appearances and goals

Henry Brandon (26 March 1870 – 1935) was a Scottish footballer who played in the Football League for The Wednesday; he won the FA Cup with the club in 1896).

He had several relatives who played the game: cousins Tom (also an FA Cup winner, with Blackburn Rovers), James and Bob all played for St Mirren and Sheffield Wednesday to some extent, and Tom's son of the same name played for clubs including Hull City.

== See also ==
- List of Scottish football families
- List of Sheffield Wednesday F.C. players
