= David Elliot =

David Elliot may refer to:

- David Elliot (illustrator) (born 1952), New Zealand illustrator
- David Elliot (footballer) (born 1969), Scottish former footballer
- David Elliot (actor) (born 1981), Scottish actor

== See also ==
- David Elliott (disambiguation)
