= Richard Sharpe =

Richard Sharpe may refer to:

- Richard Sharpe (actor) (died 1632), English actor
- Richard Sharpe (scientist) (born 1947), scientist and expert in fertility and reproduction
- Richard Sharpe (historian) (1954–2020), history professor at the University of Oxford
- Richard Sharpe (died 1557), one of the Marian martyrs
- Richard Sharpe (soccer) (born 1967), English football (soccer) player
- Richard Bowdler Sharpe (1847–1909), English zoologist
- Richard Sharpe (MP), Member of Parliament for Grantham in 1554
- Richard Sharpe, British ice dancer in the 2008 British Figure Skating Championships
- Richard Sharpe (fictional character), the main character in the Sharpe novel series and TV series/movies

== See also ==
- Richard Sharp (disambiguation)
- Ricky Sharpe (American football) (born 1980), Arena Football League player
