= Tom Brandon (footballer, born 1867) =

Scottish footballer (1867–1941)

Personal information
- Full name: William Thomas Brandon
- Date of birth: 3 October 1867
- Place of birth: Kilbirnie, Scotland
- Date of death: November 24, 1941 (aged 74)
- Place of death: Edinburgh, Scotland
- Position: Right back

Senior career*
| Years | Team | Apps | (Gls) |
| – | Clippens | | |
| 1885–1886 | Johnstone | | |
| 1886–1887 | Port Glasgow Athletic | 0 | (0) |
| 1887 | Renfrew Athletic | | |
| 1887–1889 | St Mirren | | |
| 1889–1891 | Blackburn Rovers | 39 | (1) |
| 1892–1893 | Sheffield Wednesday | 30 | (2) |
| 1893 | Nelson | | |
| 1893–1900 | Blackburn Rovers | 177 | (1) |
| 1900–1901 | St Mirren | 8 | (0) |

International career
| 1891 | Football League XI | 1 | (0) |
| 1896 | Scotland | 1 | (0) |
- * Club domestic league appearances and goals

William Thomas Brandon (3 October 1867 – 24 November 1941) was a Scottish footballer who played in the Football League for Blackburn Rovers (where he won the FA Cup in 1891) and Sheffield Wednesday. He gained one cap for Scotland in 1896, being one of five men who were the first to be selected while playing for an English club, and in the process becoming Blackburn's first international for that nation.

He had several relatives who played the game: brothers James and Bob were teammates in his early career at St Mirren (winning a Renfrewshire Cup together in 1888) and cousin Harry was a teammate in his short spell with at Sheffield Wednesday (Harry later too won the FA Cup in 1896). His son, also named Tom, was also a professional footballer, playing for Hull City, West Ham and Bradford Park Avenue in the 1920s, and additionally he was the brother-in-law of Blackburn teammate Geordie Dewar via marriage to sisters from the local Duckworth family, though both relationships ended acrimoniously.

== See also ==
- List of Blackburn Rovers F.C. players
- List of Scotland international footballers with one cap
- List of Scottish football families
- List of Sheffield Wednesday F.C. players
