= Jim Walker (Scottish footballer) =

Scottish footballer

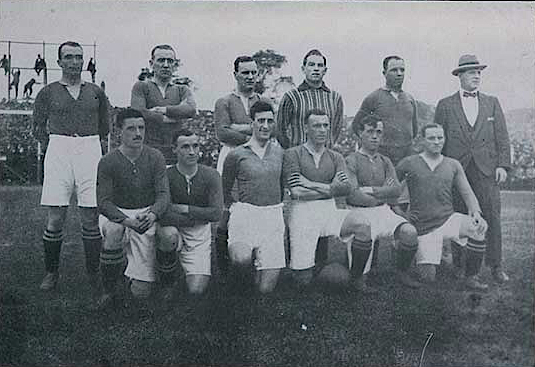
- Third Lanark team during 1923 tour – Walker kneeling, far left

Personal information
- Full name: James Walker
- Date of birth: 1893
- Place of birth: Paisley, Scotland
- Position: Inside forward

Senior career*
Years	Team	Apps	(Gls)
1914–1919	Queen's Park	15	(3)
1919–1925	Third Lanark	189	(7)
1925–1926	Dundee United	33	(3)
- * Club domestic league appearances and goals

James Walker was a Scottish professional footballer who made over 180 appearances as an inside forward in the Scottish League for Third Lanark. He took part in the club's off-season tour of South America in 1923. He also played for Dundee United and Queen's Park.

An appearance in the 1920 Home Scots v Anglo-Scots trial match was the closest he came to any international recognition.

== Personal life ==
Walker's brothers Willie and Frank were also Queen's Park footballers. He served in the Glasgow Highlanders during the First World War and was a school teacher by profession.

== Career statistics ==
Appearances and goals by club, season and competition
Club	Season	League			Scottish Cup		Other		Total	
Club	Season	Division	Apps	Goals	Apps	Goals	Apps	Goals	Apps	Goals
Queen's Park	1913–14	Scottish Division One	2	0	0	0	1 (Note: Appearance in the Glasgow Merchants Charity Cup)	0	3	0
Queen's Park	1914–15	Scottish Division One	13	4	—		2 (Note: 1 appearance in Glasgow Cup, 1 appearance in War Fund Shield)	0	15	4
Queen's Park	1918–19	Scottish Division One	4	0	—		1 (Note: Appearance in Victory Cup)	0	5	0
Queen's Park	Total		19	4	0	0	4	0	23	4
Third Lanark	1919–20	Scottish Division One	40	0	4	0	—		44	0
Third Lanark	1920–21	Scottish Division One	33	1	3	0	—		36	1
Third Lanark	1921–22	Scottish Division One	39	1	2	0	—		41	1
Third Lanark	1922–23	Scottish Division One	30	2	8	0	—		38	2
Third Lanark	1923–24	Scottish Division One	19	1	0	0	—		19	1
Third Lanark	1924–25	Scottish Division One	28	1	1	0	—		29	1
Third Lanark	Total		189	7	18	0	—		207	7
Dundee United	1925–26	Scottish Division One	33	3	1	0	—		34	3
Career total			241	14	19	0	4	0	264	14
