= Archie Livingstone =

Scottish footballer

Personal information
- Full name: Archibald Lang Livingstone
- Date of birth: 30 August 1872
- Place of birth: Old Kilpatrick, Scotland
- Date of death: 1963
- Position: Wing half

Senior career*
Years	Team	Apps	(Gls)
1889–	Carlton		
–1893	Glasgow Whitefield		
1893–1900	Burnley	169	(2)
1900–1901	Nelson		
1901–1904	Burton United	72	(2)
1904–1905	Brighton & Hove Albion	26	(0)
1905–1910	Norwich City	118	(1)
- Peterborough City

Managerial career
- Norwich City (reserves)
- Peterborough City (player-manager)
- * Club domestic league appearances and goals

Archibald Lang Livingstone (30 August 1872 – after 1910) was a Scottish professional footballer who played as a wing half in the Football League for Burnley and Burton United. He also played in the Southern League and the Scottish League and later player-managed Peterborough City.

== Personal life ==
Livingstone was the older brother of international footballer George Livingstone.

== Honours ==
Burnley

- Football League Second Division: 1897–98
