= Jim Brown (soccer, born 1908) =

American soccer player

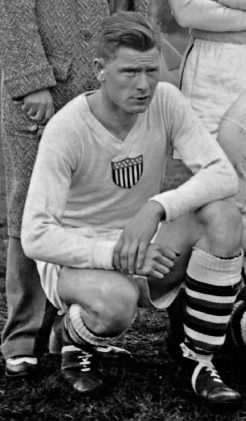
- Brown lining up with the United States at the 1930 FIFA World Cup

Personal information
- Date of birth: December 31, 1908
- Place of birth: Kilmarnock, Scotland
- Date of death: November 9, 1994 (aged 85)
- Place of death: Berkeley Heights, New Jersey, U.S.
- Height: 6 ft 0 in (1.83 m)
- Position: Outside forward

Senior career*
Years	Team	Apps	(Gls)
1928	Bayonne Rovers	16	(13)
1928–1929	Newark Skeeters	42	(12)
1929	New York Nationals	1	(0)
1929–1930	→ New York Giants	26	(13)
1930	→ New York Soccer Club	25	(6)
1931	Brooklyn Wanderers	31	(10)
1931–1932	Newark Americans	13	(7)
1932–1934	Manchester United	40	(17)
1934–1936	Brentford	1	(0)
1936–1937	Tottenham Hotspur	4	(0)
1937–1941	Guildford City	98	(92)
1940	Brentford (guest)		
1941	Clyde (guest)		
1950–1952	Greenport United	0	(0)
Total		199	(88)

International career
1930	United States	4	(1)

Managerial career
- 1948–1950: Greenwich High School
- 1950–1952: Greenport United
- 1952–1974: Brunswick School
- 1956–1958: Elizabeth Falcons
Medal record
Men's soccer
Representing United States
FIFA World Cup
Third place	1930 Uruguay
- * Club domestic league appearances and goals

James Brown (December 31, 1908 – November 9, 1994) was a soccer player and coach who played as an outside forward. Born in Scotland, he played for the United States men's national soccer team at the 1930 FIFA World Cup, scoring the only goal of the American team in their 6–1 semi-final loss to Argentina. He began his career in the American Soccer League before moving to England and then Scotland. After retiring from playing, he coached at the youth, senior amateur, and professional levels. He was inducted into the U.S. National Soccer Hall of Fame in 1986.

== Youth ==
While born in Kilmarnock, Brown grew up in Troon, and became an apprentice riveter at the Troon Shipyard when he was 13. In 1920, his father deserted the family and moved to the United States. In 1927, Brown left Scotland to search for his father, settling in Westfield, New Jersey and finding work on the production floor of a metal box factory, where his riveting skills were handy. He was the oldest of four brothers, two of whom played professionally as goalkeepers: John earned a cap with Scotland and won the 1939 Scottish Cup with Clyde, while his youngest brother Tom played professionally in England for Ipswich Town. Their uncle Alex Lambie (husband of their mother's sister) was an imposing professional center-half and captain of Partick Thistle in the 1920s.

== Amateur career ==
Brown never played organized soccer in Scotland as a youth. When he arrived in the United States, he joined the Plainfield Soccer Club scoring 4 goals in one game and then a 5th goal in the next match. He then played with Bayonne Rovers, a local amateur team in the spring of 1928. They were a top team in the Northern New Jersey League and had playing for them, Henry Carroll, known as "Razzo", the 16 year old U.S. Olympic Team striker, who had participated in the 1928 Summer Olympics in Amsterdam. Brown, known in the local Bayonne Courier newspaper as "Red" or "Ginger", was the fiery thatched youngster who scored a goal in every match he played with Bayonne. In September 1928, he signed with the Newark Skeeters of the American Soccer League. However, the league suspended the Skeeters in September 1928 as part of the "Soccer War". Newark then joined two other suspended ASL teams and several others from the Southern New York Soccer Association to form the Eastern Professional Soccer League. Brown played 42 games and scored 12 goals with Newark in the ASL and the EPSL, or ESL as it was better known. In the middle of the season, James was listed as the 18th leading goalscorer, out of 18 players in the league. However, at the end of the season, he returned to the ASL when he signed with the New York Nationals, but only played one game and scored no goals.

== Professional career ==
=== United States ===
In 1930, Brown became a professional with the New York Giants, scoring 13 goals in 26 appearances. Soon after, he was called up to the U.S. national team for the 1930 World Cup. On his return from Uruguay, he rejoined his team that was renamed the New York Soccer Club, where he scored 6 goals in 25 appearances. He then moved to the Brooklyn Wanderers for the 1931 spring season with his old teammate, Razzo Carroll, where James scored 10 goals in 31 appearances. Brown moved to the Newark Americans in the fall 1931 season, but by this time the ASL was collapsing, and he played 13 games and scored 7 goals. Because of the decline in U.S. soccer, he decided to return to the UK in August 1932.

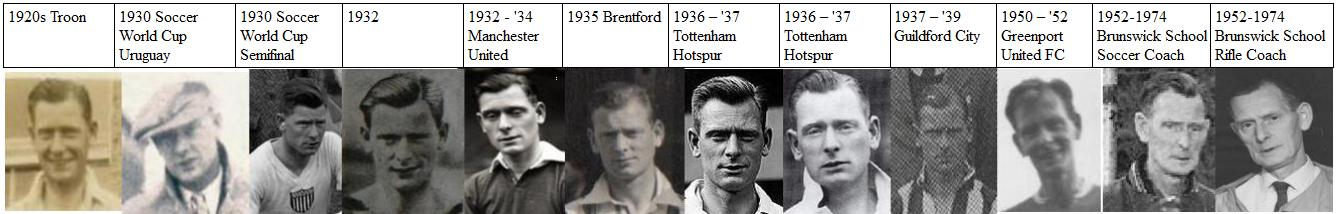

=== England ===
Based on his success in the U.S. both professionally and with the national team, several teams from both England and Scotland expressed an interest in signing Brown. In August 1932, as the Caledonia Cruise liner neared the dock, representatives from these teams awaited him. However, Scott Duncan, manager of Manchester United, took a tugboat out to the liner and signed Brown on board. Brown played from 1932 to 1934 with United, scoring 17 goals in 40 games, the second highest on the team. Notably, he scored directly from a corner kick in his first game against Grimsby Town within 90 seconds. While Brown scored regularly with United, he alienated the team management with his outspoken support for a players' union. On May 6, 1934, before United transferred Brown to Second Division Brentford for £300, he scored the only goal in the Manchester (Senior) Cup final match against cross-town rival, Manchester City, at Old Trafford, 1–0. Unfortunately, as with Manchester, his union sentiments quickly soured his relationship with the Brentford's team ownership. He made only one appearance for the first team, but scored 53 goals in 74 games for the reserves and won the 1934–35 London Challenge Cup.

In September 1936, newly promoted, First Division Brentford sent Brown to Tottenham Hotspur for a transfer fee of £1,200. In his one season there, he played only four first team games, but scored twenty-one goals in thirty games for the reserves. In July 1937, Brown moved to semi-professional Guildford City of the Southern Football League for a fee of £750. Over his two seasons with Guildford City, Brown scored 148 goals in 150 games and helped the club win the Southern League title during the 1937–38 season. During the 1938/39 season, Brown recorded five Hat-Tricks and scored seven goals (six of them headers) in one game versus Exeter City. Guildford finished in second place, losing out on a second consecutive title by just one point. James had been sick and out of most of the play during the last month of the season. He was loaned out to Brentford's First Division team, to play center-half in the FA Cup match against Fulham, where he scored a goal. He left Guildford City at the end of the 1939/40 season, because of increasing cartilage problems. Guildford City suspended all League play in September 1940. He then moved north to finish his career with Scottish First Division club Clyde, signing in November 1940 and played two matches with his brother John against Queen's Park in February and March 1941. In the February match with Clyde, just like his debut with Manchester United, Brown scored directly from a corner kick. He retired due to injuries soon after. Clyde finished in second place, only three points behind eventual champions Rangers during the 1940/41 season.

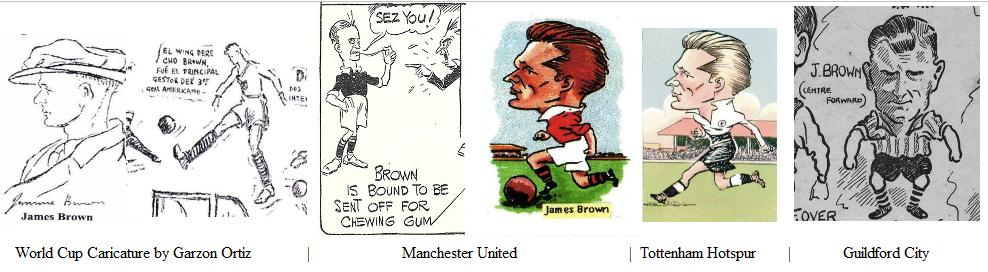
James Brown Soccer Cartoons or Caricatures in the 1930s

== National team ==
In 1930, Brown was called up to the United States national team as it prepared for the 1930 FIFA World Cup. At the time, national team requirements were less stringent and Brown was selected based on his father's, not his own, citizenship. Although, he was granted U.S. citizenship by mid-June 1930. Brown played all three U.S. games in the cup as the team went to the semifinals, scoring the only goal for the U.S. in the 89th minute against Argentina. Following their elimination, the U.S. played a series of exhibition games throughout South America against professional and regional teams in Uruguay and Brazil. Brown scored one goal in the last exhibition game against Botafogo in Brazil, a 4–3 loss that counted as a full international. Those were the only four caps with the U.S. national team.

=== International goals ===
United States' goal tally first

#	Date	Venue	Opponent	Score	Result	Competition
1.	July 26, 1930	Estadio Centenario, Montevideo, Uruguay	Argentina	1–6	1–6	1930 FIFA World Cup

== Coaching career ==
In late 1948, he returned to the United States where he became the head coach of the Greenwich High School soccer team. In September 1949, James played one match in an attempted come-back with powerhouse Hispano, alongside a young goalie tending the sticks by the name of Gene Olaff. Two years later, James joined several other men in forming the Connecticut State Amateur League as well as Greenport United. When his son, George began playing for Greenport, Brown joined him for two seasons as a player-coach. He then coached the Brunswick School soccer team for twenty-two years and the Elizabeth Falcons of the American Soccer League from 1956 to 1958. Brown was inducted into the National Soccer Hall of Fame in 1986, the Connecticut State Hall of Fame, and New England Hall of Fame. His son George was inducted in 1995.

== Personal life ==
Having retired from playing professionally in 1941, Brown resumed his trade as a riveter in the Troon Shipyard and then moved back to the U.S. to coach Varsity soccer and Riflery.

== Honors ==
Manchester United Reserves

- Manchester Senior Cup (1): 1933–34

Brentford Reserves

- London Challenge Cup (1): 1934–35

Guildford City

- Southern Football League (1): 1937–38
- Mayor of Aldershot Cup (1): 1939
- Surrey Combination Cup (2): 1938 – 1940
- Leading goalscorer 1937/1938 & 1938/1939

United States

- FIFA World Cup: Third place, 1930

Individual

- National Soccer Hall of Fame: 1986
- Connecticut State Hall of Fame: 2000
- New England Hall of Fame: 2005

== See also ==
- List of Scottish football families
- List of United States men's international soccer players born outside the United States
