= Tommy Callaghan =

Scottish footballer and manager (1944–2024)

Personal information
- Date of birth: 6 December 1944
- Place of birth: Cowdenbeath, Scotland
- Date of death: 25 October 2024 (aged 79)
- Position: Midfielder

Youth career
- Lochore Welfare

Senior career*
Years	Team	Apps	(Gls)
1962–1968	Dunfermline Athletic	126	(20)
1968–1976	Celtic	172	(14)
1976	→ San Antonio Thunder (loan)	9	(0)
1976–1978	Clydebank	30	(2)
1978–1979	Galway Rovers	29	(4)
Total		366	(40)

International career
1968–1971	Scottish League XI	2	(0)

Managerial career
- 1978–1979: Galway Rovers
- * Club domestic league appearances and goals

Thomas Callaghan (6 December 1944 – 25 October 2024) was a Scottish professional footballer who played for Celtic, Dunfermline Athletic and Clydebank. He was a left-sided midfielder known for his long attacking runs from deep positions and powerful shot. Callaghan won multiple honours with Celtic.

== Career ==
Born in Cowdenbeath, he signed for Celtic from Dunfermline on 22 November 1968 for a reported £35,000. He scored on his debut the following day in a 4–0 win over Partick Thistle at Firhill. Callaghan played in the infamous European Cup semi-final tie against Atletico Madrid at Celtic Park on 10 April 1974. After making more than 250 appearances for Celtic, Callaghan moved to Clydebank on 4 November 1976. He scored for his new club on his debut three days later. He left Clydebank in 1978 to become player-manager of Galway Rovers in Ireland.

Callaghan represented the Scottish League twice and gained his first Scottish Cup winner's medal while with Dunfermline in 1968, his final season with the Fife club.

== Personal life ==
His brother Willie played for Dunfermline and Scotland, and his father William, maternal uncles Patrick Flannigan and David Flannigan, son Tommy Callaghan Jr nephew Willie Callaghan Jr, and grand-nephew Liam Callaghan all played football.

On 25 October 2024, Callaghan died at the age of 79.

== Honours ==
Celtic

- Scottish League Division One (6): 1969–1974
- Scottish Cup: 1971, 1972, 1974
- Scottish League Cup: 1969, 1970
