= Tom Spence =

Scottish footballer and manager

Personal information
- Date of birth: 4 January 1960
- Place of birth: Airdrie, Scotland
- Date of death: 28 April 2012 (aged 52)
- Height: 5 ft 11 in (1.80 m)
- Position: Left-back

Youth career
- Glenboig

Senior career*
Years	Team	Apps	(Gls)
1982–1988	Stirling Albion	147	(6)
1988	Alloa Athletic	1	(0)
1988	Cowdenbeath	2	(0)
1988–1989	Clydebank	29	(4)
1989–1990	Clyde	12	(0)
1990–1991	Kilmarnock	50	(1)
1991–1993	East Fife	58	(1)
1993–1994	Albion Rovers	12	(0)
Total		311	(12)

Managerial career
- 1994–1995: Albion Rovers
- * Club domestic league appearances and goals

Tom Spence (4 January 1960 – 28 April 2012) was a Scottish football player and manager. He was born in Airdrie, North Lanarkshire. Spence played for Stirling Albion, Clydebank, Clyde and Kilmarnock and was captain of the Stirling Albion team which defeated Selkirk 20–0 in 1984.

Former Cumnock, Thorniewood and Dunipace boss Tom - or Tam as he was better known - Spence died suddenly overnight, at the age of just 52.
