= Kenny MacDonald (footballer) =

Scottish footballer

Personal information
- Date of birth: 9 March 1961 (age 65)
- Place of birth: Dundee, Scotland
- Position: Forward

Senior career*
| Years | Team | Apps | (Gls) |
- Broughty Athletic
| 1981–1982 | St Johnstone | 10 | (2) |
| 1982–1985 | Forfar Athletic | 82 | (43) |
| 1985–1986 | Happy Valley | | |
| 1986–1988 | Forfar Athletic | 85 | (37) |
| 1988–1990 | Airdrie | 44 | (27) |
| 1990–1991 | Raith Rovers | 37 | (12) |
| 1991–1992 | St Johnstone | 11 | (0) |
| 1992–1993 | Arbroath | 29 | (4) |
| 1993 | Stirling Albion | 1 | (0) |
| 1993–1994 | East Stirlingshire | 14 | (5) |
| 1994 | Cowdenbeath | 10 | (1) |
- Dundee St. Josephs
| Total | | 323 | (131) |
- * Club domestic league appearances and goals

Kenny MacDonald (born 9 March 1961) is a Scottish former professional footballer who played as a forward.

== Career ==
Born in Dundee, MacDonald played for Broughty Athletic, St Johnstone, Forfar Athletic, Happy Valley, Airdrie, Raith Rovers, Arbroath, Stirling Albion, East Stirlingshire, Cowdenbeath and Dundee St. Josephs.
