= Frank Walker (Scottish footballer) =

Scottish footballer (1897–1949)

Personal information
- Full name: Francis Gemmell Fulton Walker
- Date of birth: 1897
- Place of birth: Lochwinnoch, Scotland
- Date of death: 1949 (aged 51–52)
- Place of death: Edinburgh, Scotland
- Position: Inside forward

Senior career*
Years	Team	Apps	(Gls)
1916–1917	Queen's Park	12	(6)
1919–1927	Third Lanark	188	(68)

International career
1922	Scotland	1	(0)
- * Club domestic league appearances and goals

Francis Gemmell Fulton Walker (1897–1949) was a Scottish professional footballer who made over 180 appearances as an inside forward in the Scottish League for Third Lanark. He was capped by Scotland at international level.

== Personal life ==
Walker attended Paisley Grammar School and his two older brothers, Willie and Jim, also played football for Queen's Park. After leaving school, he took up a job as a civil servant. In March 1917, during the First World War, Walker was called up to serve with the Royal Field Artillery. Holding the rank of bombardier, he was part of the Army of Occupation and was stationed in Cologne. After retiring from football due to a broken leg, Walker became an income tax inspector.
