= Alexander Hamilton (footballer, born 1865) =

Scottish footballer

Alexander Hamilton (born 22 July 1865) was a Scottish footballer who played as an outside right for Queen's Park, Corinthian and Rangers, and represented Scotland four times.

Hamilton was the eldest of three brothers to play for Scotland, the others being Gladstone and James. A fourth brother, John, was an early international for Chile having moved there for work reasons.
