= Paul Chalmers =

Scottish footballer (born 1963)

Personal information
- Full name: Paul Chalmers
- Date of birth: 31 October 1963 (age 63)
- Place of birth: Glasgow, Scotland
- Position: Striker

Youth career
- Eastercraigs
- 1980–1984: Celtic

Senior career*
| Years | Team | Apps | (Gls) |
| 1984–1986 | Celtic | 4 | (1) |
| 1986 | → Bradford City (loan) | 2 | (0) |
| 1986–1990 | St Mirren | 100 | (23) |
| 1990–1992 | Swansea City | 58 | (13) |
| 1992–1993 | Dunfermline Athletic | 32 | (9) |
| 1993–1995 | Hamilton Academical | 44 | (7) |
| 1995 | Ayr United | 5 | (1) |
| 1995–1996 | East Fife | 8 | (4) |
| Total | | 253 | (58) |
- * Club domestic league appearances and goals

Paul Chalmers (born 31 October 1963) is a Scottish former professional footballer who played as a striker for several clubs, primarily St Mirren in Scotland and Swansea City in the English leagues.

== Career ==
Born in Glasgow, Chalmers played for Eastercraigs as a youth before signing for Celtic. He made his debut for Celtic on 19 February 1985, coming as a substitute in a home league match against Morton and scoring in a 4–0 win. However, he would only make another 3 appearances for Celtic and did not score again. After a brief spell on loan at Bradford City, Chalmers signed for St Mirren in 1986 for a £20,000 fee.

In his four years at Love Street, Chalmers scored a total of 27 goals in 113 appearances. In 1987 he played in several of St Mirren's Scottish Cup ties, scoring twice in their 4th round 3–2 win over Morton and once in their 2-0 quarter-final win over Raith Rovers. Alas, he was injured for the latter part of the season and missed his side's 1-0 Final win over Dundee United. He did get the opportunity to play in four European games in the Cup Winners' Cup in the following season's campaign. In season 1988–89, Chalmers was St Mirren's top scorer in the league with 11 goals.

On leaving St Mirren in November 1989, Chalmers signed for Swansea City for a fee of £124,000 where he won the Welsh Cup in 1991, before returning to Scotland in 1992 to play for Dunfermline Athletic. A year later he joined Hamilton Academical, scoring on his league debut against Brechin City. Chalmers played in both defence and attack during his time with Accies, scoring seven goals in 48 appearances. He moved on to Ayr United in 1995 and then on to East Fife.

== Personal life ==
He is the son of Lisbon Lion, Stevie Chalmers, who scored the winning goal for Celtic in the 1967 European Cup Final. His grandfather David was also a footballer who played for Clydebank in the 1920s.

After retiring from football, Chalmers embarked on a career as an estate agent, first in Scotland and then in the United Arab Emirates.
