= Willie Hamilton (footballer, born 1889) =

Scottish footballer

Personal information
- Full name: William Hamilton
- Date of birth: 9 October 1889
- Place of birth: Scoonie, Scotland
- Date of death: 14 August 1921 (aged 31)
- Place of death: Kingseat, Scotland
- Height: 5 ft 9 in (1.75 m)
- Position: Centre half

Senior career*
Years	Team	Apps	(Gls)
–	Cowdenbeath Vulcan Rovers		
1909–1911	Dunfermline Athletic		
1911–1921	Partick Thistle	245	(12)
- * Club domestic league appearances and goals

William Hamilton (9 October 1889 – 14 August 1921) was a Scottish footballer who played as a centre half, primarily for Partick Thistle.

Initially signed from Dunfermline Athletic (still to become members of the Scottish Football League at that point) as a left half before moving to the central 'pivot' role when Alex Raisbeck retired in 1913, Hamilton amassed 294 appearances for the Jags in all competitions and scored 15 goals across nine seasons. He finished on the losing side in five minor cup finals (1911, 1917, and 1919 Glasgow Cup, 1916 and 1918 Glasgow Merchants Charity Cup) and missed out on the biggest match in Partick's history, the final of the Scottish Cup in 1921, due to an ankle injury having played in all earlier rounds. Despite his absence (and that of Jimmy McMullan), highlighted in the press pre-match as a blow to Thistle's chances, the team defeated Rangers 1–0 to claim the trophy for the only time.

Within a few months of that cup win Hamilton had contracted tuberculosis, his health declined rapidly and he returned to his home region of Fife where he died in August 1921, aged 31.
