= Bob Bennie =

Scottish footballer

Personal information
- Full name: Robert Hunter Brown Bennie
- Date of birth: 27 March 1900
- Place of birth: Slamannan, Scotland
- Date of death: 27 July 1972 (aged 72)
- Place of death: Airdrie, Scotland
- Position: Left half

Senior career*
| Years | Team | Apps | (Gls) |
| – | Parkhead | | |
| 1916–1920 | Third Lanark | 70 | (17) |
| 1920–1928 | Airdrieonians | 290 | (7) |
| 1928–1933 | Heart of Midlothian | 137 | (5) |
| 1933 | Raith Rovers | 1 | (0) |
| Total | | 462 | (29) |

International career
| 1925–1926 | Scotland | 3 | (0) |
| 1928 | Scottish Football League XI | 1 | (0) |

Managerial career
- 1933–1934: Raith Rovers
- * Club domestic league appearances and goals

Robert Hunter Brown Bennie (27 March 1900 – 27 July 1972) was a Scottish footballer who played as a left half.

Bennie was capped three times by the Scotland national team between 1925 and 1926, while playing club football for Airdrieonians (where he spent eight years, making over 300 appearances, finishing runners-up in the Scottish Football League on four occasions and winning the Scottish Cup in 1924). In 1928 he was signed by Heart of Midlothian for £2,300, moving on to become manager of Raith Rovers five years later.

He was the most prominent member of a footballing family: his uncles Peter and John had short careers in Scotland, another uncle Bob played for St Mirren and Newcastle United, and his cousin Peter for Burnley and Bradford City.
