= Stevie Chalmers =

Scottish footballer (1935–2019)

Personal information
- Full name: Thomas Stephen Chalmers
- Date of birth: 26 December 1935
- Place of birth: Glasgow, Scotland
- Date of death: 29 April 2019 (aged 83)
- Positions: Centre forward; outside right

Youth career
- 1953–1955: Kirkintilloch Rob Roy
- 1955–1956: Newmarket Town

Senior career*
Years	Team	Apps	(Gls)
1956–1959	Ashfield		
1959	Dumbarton (trialist)	1	(0)
1959–1971	Celtic	263	(155)
1971–1972	Morton	32	(8)
1972–1975	Partick Thistle	44	(6)
Total		340	(169)

International career
1962–1967	Scottish League XI	4	(0)
1964–1966	Scotland	5	(3)
- * Club domestic league appearances and goals

Thomas Stephen Chalmers (26 December 1935 – 29 April 2019) was a Scottish footballer who played as a centre-forward and spent the majority of his career with Celtic. He is the club's fifth-highest goalscorer with 236 goals and is considered one of their greatest players. He is particularly known for scoring the winning goal in the 1967 European Cup Final against Inter Milan. Chalmers later played for Morton and Partick Thistle. He also represented Scotland five times in international matches.

== Early life ==
Chalmers was born on 26 December 1935 in the Garngad district of Glasgow, where he attended St Roch's Secondary School. The family later moved to nearby Balornock. His father, David, played for Clydebank.

== Career ==
Leaving school aged 14, he signed for Kirkintilloch Rob Roy in 1953. Subsequently, he joined the RAF and during his time doing national service at RAF Stradishall in 1955 played for Newmarket Town. He then moved back to Scotland, signing with SJFA team Ashfield, and represented Scotland at that level in 1959. Shortly afterwards he signed for Celtic, making his league debut in March 1959 against Airdrie.

He spent 12 full seasons with Celtic, helping the club to six league titles, three Scottish Cups, and four League Cups, as well as being part of the Lisbon Lions side that won the 1967 European Cup. He scored the winning goal in the 85th minute of the final, and in doing so also sealed the first European Treble and the only Quadruple to date.

His involvement became limited after he broke a leg in the 1969 Scottish League Cup Final, and he missed the rest of that season including the 1970 European Cup Final. His total of 236 goals is the fifth-highest in the history of the club, and he is remembered as one of the greatest players in Celtic's history.

After leaving Celtic Park in September 1971 at the age of 35, Chalmers continued to appear in Scotland's top tier, with spells at Morton and Partick Thistle before he retired in 1975. He made a very brief comeback with junior club St Roch's during the 1975–76 season.

He was inducted into the Scottish Football Hall of Fame in 2016.

=== International ===
Chalmers won five full caps for Scotland between 1964 and 1966, scoring three goals. He was also selected four times for the Scottish Football League XI.

== Personal life ==
Chalmers's father David played for Clydebank in the 1920s, and his son, Paul, also played professionally with several clubs after starting his career with Celtic in the 1980s. Chalmers and his wife, Sadie, had six children.

In 1955, he was diagnosed with tuberculosis meningitis and was given only weeks to live before being successfully treated.

It was reported in May 2017 that 81-year-old Chalmers was suffering from dementia and was unable to attend the Lisbon Lions' 50th anniversary events. Chalmers died on 29 April 2019, aged 83.

== Career statistics ==
=== Club ===
Club performance	League		Cup		League Cup		Continental		Total	
Club	Apps	Goals	Apps	Goals	Apps	Goals	Apps	Goals	Apps	Goals
Dumbarton	1	0					0	0	1+	0+
Celtic	263	155	47	29	60	31	38	13	408	228
Greenock Morton	32	8	0	0	4	3	0	0	36	11
Partick Thistle	44	6							44+	6+
Career total	340	169	47+	29+	64+	34+	38+	13+	489+	245+

=== International appearances ===
Scotland national team
Year	Apps	Goals
1964	2	2
1965	—	
1966	3	1
Total	5	3

=== International goals ===
Scores and results list Scotland's goal tally first.

No.	Date	Venue	Opponent	Score	Result	Competition
1.	3 October 1964	Ninian Park, Cardiff	Wales	1–1	2–3	1964–65 British Home Championship
2.	21 October 1964	Hampden Park, Glasgow	Finland	2–0	3–1	1966 FIFA World Cup qualification
3.	25 June 1966	Hampden Park, Glasgow	Brazil	1–0	1–1	Friendly match

== Honours ==
Celtic

- European Cup: 1966–67
- Intercontinental Cup runners-up: 1967
- Scottish League Championship (4): 1965–66, 1966–67, 1967–68, 1968–69 (Note: Did not play enough games in 1969–70 or 1970–71)
- Scottish Cup (3): 1964–65, 1966–67, 1968–69 (Note: Did not play in 1971 final)
- Scottish League Cup (4): 1966–67, 1967–68, 1968–69, 1969–70 (Note: Did not play in 1965 final)
- Glasgow Cup (4): 1961–62, 1963–64, 1964–65, 1966–67

Scotland

- Home Championship: 1966–67
