= Bob Bennie (footballer, born 1873) =

Scottish footballer

Personal information
- Full name: Robert Brown Bennie
- Date of birth: 28 September 1873
- Place of birth: Polmont, Scotland
- Date of death: 1 October 1945 (aged 72)
- Place of death: Newcastle upon Tyne, England
- Height: 5 ft 8 in (1.73 m)
- Position: Full back

Senior career*
Years	Team	Apps	(Gls)
1894–1895	Airdrieonians		
1895–1896	Heart of Midlothian		
–	Royal Albert		
1896–1901	St Mirren	71	(0)
1901–1904	Newcastle United	33	(0)
1904	Morpeth Harriers		
Total		104	(0)
- * Club domestic league appearances and goals

Robert Brown Bennie (28 September 1873 – 1 October 1945) was a Scottish footballer who played in the Football League for Newcastle United. He came into consideration for an international cap in 1902, taking part in the Home Scots v Anglo-Scots trial, but this did not lead on to selection for Scotland.

He was a member of a footballing family: older brother Peter (a teammate at St Mirren) and younger brother John had short careers in Scotland, nephew Peter played for Burnley in the 1920s and nephew Bob played for Scotland in the same period.
