= Gladstone Hamilton =

Scottish footballer

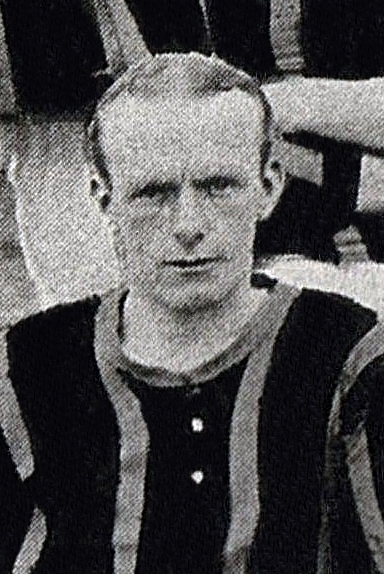
- Hamilton with Brentford in 1908.

Personal information
- Full name: Gladstone Hamilton
- Date of birth: 23 July 1879
- Place of birth: Glasgow, Scotland
- Date of death: 12 December 1961 (aged 82)
- Place of death: Millport, Scotland
- Position: Outside right

Senior career*
Years	Team	Apps	(Gls)
1899–1900	Queen's Park	0	(0)
1901–1902	Ayr	25	(3)
1902–1906	Port Glasgow Athletic	60	(9)
1906–1908	St Mirren	8	(2)
1907–1908	→ Port Glasgow Athletic (loan)	29	(4)
1908–1909	Brentford	3	(0)
1909–1913	Port Glasgow Athletic	18	(1)
1910	→ Morton (loan)	5	(0)

International career
1906	Scotland	1	(0)
- * Club domestic league appearances and goals

Gladstone Hamilton (23 July 1879 – 12 December 1961) was a Scottish footballer who played as an outside right in the Scottish League for Port Glasgow Athletic, Ayr, St Mirren, Morton and Queen's Park. He was capped by Scotland in 1906 and was the only serving Port Glasgow Athletic player to have been selected for international duty.

== Personal life ==
Hamilton's elder brothers Alexander and James were also Scotland international players. Historians have suggested that the success of his siblings may have been a factor in his selection, as his own club career was fairly unremarkable. A fourth brother, John, was an early international for Chile, after having moved there for work reasons.

== Career statistics ==
Appearances and goals by club, season and competition
Club	Season	League			National Cup		Total	
Club	Season	Division	Apps	Goals	Apps	Goals	Apps	Goals
Queen's Park	1898–99	Glasgow League	1	0	0	0	1	0
Queen's Park	1899–1900	Inter City League	1	1	0	0	1	1
Queen's Park	Total		2	1	0	0	2	1
Ayr	1900–01	Scottish League Division Two	5	1	2	0	7	1
Ayr	1901–02	Scottish League Division Two	19	2	6	0	25	2
Ayr	1902–03	Scottish League Division Two	1	0	—		1	0
Ayr	Total		25	3	8	0	33	3
Port Glasgow Athletic	1902–03	Scottish League Division One	17	3	2	0	19	3
Port Glasgow Athletic	1903–04	Scottish League Division One	4	0	0	0	4	0
Port Glasgow Athletic	1904–05	Scottish League Division One	23	6	0	0	23	6
Port Glasgow Athletic	1905–06	Scottish League Division One	16	0	6	2	22	2
Port Glasgow Athletic	Total		60	9	8	2	68	11
St Mirren	1906–07	Scottish League Division One	8	2	1	0	9	2
Port Glasgow Athletic (loan)	1907–08	Scottish League Division One	29	4	2	1	31	5
Brentford	1908–09	Southern League First Division	3	0	0	0	3	0
Port Glasgow Athletic	1909–10	Scottish League Division One	18	1	—		18	1
Port Glasgow Athletic	Total		107	14	10	3	117	17
Morton (loan)	1909–10	Scottish League Division One	5	0	1	0	6	0
Career total			150	20	20	3	170	23
