= 1925–26 Dundee United F.C. season =

Dundee United
1925–26 season
- Manager: Jimmy Brownlie
- Stadium: Tannadice Park
- Scottish Football League First Division: 17th W11 D6 L21 F52 A74 P28
- Scottish Cup: Round 1

The 1925–26 Dundee United F.C. season was the 17th edition of Dundee United F.C. annual football play in Scottish Football League First Division from 1 July 1925 to 30 June 1926.

== Match results ==
Dundee United played a total of 41 matches during the 1925–26 season, ranked 17th.

=== Legend ===
Win
Draw
Loss

All results are written with Dundee United's score first. Own goals in italics

=== First Division ===
Date	Opponent	Venue	Result	Attendance	Scorers
15 August 1925	Raith Rovers	A	2–4	10,000	
22 August 1925	Cowdenbeath	A	1–5	6,000	
29 August 1925	Falkirk	H	1–2	10,500	
5 September 1925	Motherwell	H	1–1	12,000	
9 September 1925	Queen's Park	H	1–2	8,000	
12 September 1925	St Johnstone	A	1–0	12,000	
19 September 1925	Celtic	H	1–0	17,000	
26 September 1925	St Mirrn	A	0–2	4,000	
3 October 1925	Clydebank	A	1–6	10,000	
10 October 1925	Hamilton Academical	H	2–5	8,000	
17 October 1925	Queen's Park	A	1–2	8,000	
24 October 1925	Kilmarnock	H	3–1	8,000	
31 October 1925	Greenock Morton	H	2–2	1,000	
7 November 1925	Heart of Midlothian	A	0–1	15,000	
14 November 1925	Aberdeen	H	2–0	11,000	
21 November 1925	Dundee	A	0–0	18,000	
28 November 1925	Hibernian	H	2–2	5,000	
5 December 1925	Partick Thistle	H	1–0	4,500	
12 December 1925	Hamilton Academical	A	1–3	3,000	
19 December 1925	Rangers	H	2–1	12,000	
26 December 1925	Airdrieonians	A	1–0	5,000	
2 January 1926	Kilmarnock	A	3–2	10,000	
4 January 1926	Dundee	H	0–1	20,059	
9 January 1926	Falkirk	A	1–1	7,000	
16 January 1926	Cowdenbeath	H	1–2	7,000	
30 January 1926	Greenock Morton	A	1–3	4,000	
6 February 1926	Motherwell	A	0–4	2,000	
13 February 1926	St Mirren	H	1–2	11,000	
24 February 1926	Heart of Midlothian	H	2–3	5,000	
27 February 1926	Partick Thistle	A	0–2	3,000	
6 March 1926	Raith Rovers	H	3–1	10,000	
20 March 1926	Airdrieonians	H	1–2	10,000	
27 March 1926	Clydebank	H	5–0	10,000	
3 April 1926	Aberdeen	A	0–1	10,500	
5 April 1926	Rangers	A	1–2	7,000	
10 April 1926	Hibernian	A	5–3	8,000	
17 April 1926	St Johnstone	H	0–0	19,979	
24 April 1926	Celtic	A	2–6	5,000	

=== Scottish Cup ===
Date	Rd	Opponent	Venue	Result	Attendance	Scorers
23 January 1926	R1	Heart of Midlothian	H	1–1	15,522	
27 January 1926	R1 R	Heart of Midlothian	A	1–1	25,000	
1 February 1926	R1 2R	Heart of Midlothian	A	0–6	20,000	
