= Grant Tierney =

Scottish footballer

Personal information
- Full name: Peter Grant Tierney
- Date of birth: 11 October 1961 (age 65)
- Place of birth: Falkirk, Scotland
- Position: Defender

Youth career
- Bainsford

Senior career*
Years	Team	Apps	(Gls)
1978–1980	Heart of Midlothian	0	(0)
1980–1985	Cowdenbeath	157	(9)
1985–1988	Meadowbank Thistle	132	(10)
1988–1990	Dunfermline Athletic	51	(3)
1990–1996	Partick Thistle	85	(5)
1996–1997	Livingston	38	(3)
1997–1998	Stenhousemuir	1	(0)
- Camelon Juniors
Total		464	(30)

Managerial career
- 2016: Camelon Juniors (caretaker)
- * Club domestic league appearances and goals

Peter Grant Tierney (born 11 October 1961) is a Scottish former footballer who has played in the Scottish Football League Premier Division for Dunfermline Athletic and Partick Thistle. Tierney has always been known as Grant rather than Peter.

== Playing career ==
Tierney began his playing career at Hearts but never made a first team appearance and after breaking a leg in a reserve team fixture, moved on to Cowdenbeath. After joining Meadowbank Thistle, he was appointed club captain and led the Edinburgh club in a successful period where they won the Scottish Football League Second Division in 1986–87 then finished runners-up in the First Division the following year, being denied a place in the Premier Division by league reconstruction.

In December 1988, Tierney joined Dunfermline Athletic and won promotion to the Premier Division at the end of the season. As the only part-time player in the top division however, Tierney gradually slipped out of the first-team at Dunfermline and he joined Partick Thistle in the summer of 1990 for what was then, a club record transfer fee. Thistle were promoted back to the Premier Division in 1992 and Tierney played a further four seasons in the top league before leaving for Livingston in January 1996.

== Coaching career ==
Tierney was appointed as caretaker-manager of Camelon Juniors in May 2016 until the end of the season following the departure of John Sludden.
