= David Chalmers (footballer, born 1897) =

Scottish footballer

Personal information
- Date of birth: 1897
- Place of birth: Burnbank, Scotland
- Date of death: 1961 (aged 63–64)
- Place of death: Springburn, Scotland
- Position: Inside left

Youth career
- Cadzow St Anne's

Senior career*
Years	Team	Apps	(Gls)
–	St Anthony's		
1921–1930	Clydebank	307	(95)
- * Club domestic league appearances and goals

David Chalmers (1897 – 1961) was a Scottish footballer who played as an inside left for Clydebank in the first and second tiers of the Scottish Football League during the 1920s, playing alongside Jimmy McGrory for a season. He had earlier played for Junior side St Anthony's and been selected to play for Scotland at that level.

His son, Stevie Chalmers, played for Celtic and Scotland, scoring the goal which won the 1967 European Cup Final; he credited his father as a quiet influence and an example to follow in his early life. David's grandson (Stevie's son), Paul Chalmers, also played professionally.
