= Robert Findlay (footballer) =

Scottish footballer

Personal information
- Date of birth: 29 March 1877
- Place of birth: Galston, Scotland
- Date of death: 13 August 1926 (aged 49)
- Place of death: Bayonne, United States
- Position: Outside left

Senior career*
Years	Team	Apps	(Gls)
–	Kilmarnock Rugby XI		
1896–1900	Kilmarnock	51	(25)
1900–1901	Celtic	14	(6)
1901–1904	Kilmarnock	27	(8)
1904–1905	Dundee	7	(1)
1905–1907	Motherwell	22	(10)
1907–1908	Hamilton Academical	7	(2)
1908–1910	Port Glasgow Athletic	75	(21)
–	→ St Bernard's (loan)		
Total		201	(73)

International career
1898	Scotland	1	(0)
- * Club domestic league appearances and goals

Robert Findlay (29 March 1877 – 13 August 1926) was a Scottish footballer who played as an outside left for Kilmarnock (two spells), Celtic, Dundee, Motherwell, Hamilton Academical, Port Glasgow Athletic, St Bernard's (on loan) and Scotland.

During his first spell at Kilmarnock, he won the Scottish Football League Division Two title twice, played in the 1898 Scottish Cup Final (a defeat at the hands of Rangers) and gained his sole international cap in the same year. With Port Glasgow, he was a Renfrewshire Cup winner in 1909 (scoring the winning goal in the final). His 'big move' to Celtic was disrupted by injury, and this also affected other spells including a return to Kilmarnock.

Findlay emigrated to New Jersey with his family around 1914; his son William represented the United States men's national soccer team at the Olympic Games in 1924 and 1928. His younger brother Tom was also a footballer, and a teammate of Robert at Kilmarnock, Motherwell and Port Glasgow Athletic.
