= James Hamilton (footballer, born 1869) =

Scottish footballer

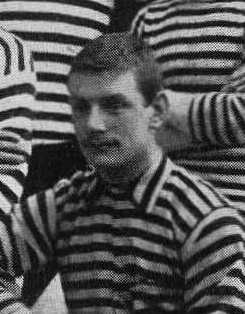
- Hamilton with Queen's Park in 1890.

Personal information
- Date of birth: 7 June 1869
- Place of birth: Glasgow, Scotland
- Date of death: 26 December 1951 (aged 82)
- Position: Centre forward

Senior career*
| Years | Team | Apps | (Gls) |
| 1884–1894 | Queen's Park | 0 | (0) |
| 1894–1895 | Rangers | 2 | (1) |
- Airdrieonians

International career
| 1892–1893 | Scotland | 3 | (3) |
- * Club domestic league appearances and goals

James Hamilton (7 June 1869 – 26 December 1951) was a Scottish footballer who played as a centre forward.

== Career ==
Born in Glasgow, Hamilton played club football for Queen's Park, Rangers and Airdrieonians, and scored three goals in three appearances for Scotland.

He played for Queen's Park between 1884 and 1894, scoring 56 goals in 88 Cup appearances for the club.

== Personal life ==
His brothers Alexander and Gladstone were also Scottish international players. A fourth brother, John, was an early international for Chile having moved there for work reasons.
