= Peter Bennie =

Scottish footballer (1899–1981)

Personal information
- Date of birth: 10 June 1899
- Place of birth: Slamannan, Scotland
- Date of death: 3 January 1981 (aged 81)
- Place of death: Larkhall, Scotland
- Height: 5 ft 2 1/2 in (1.59 m)
- Position: Outside right

Senior career*
Years	Team	Apps	(Gls)
–	Larkhall Thistle		
–	Bellshill Athletic		
–	Royal Albert		
1920–1923	Albion Rovers	64	(5)
1923–1924	Burnley	36	(7)
1924–1927	Bradford City	73	(3)
- * Club domestic league appearances and goals

Peter Bennie (10 June 1899 – 3 January 1981) was a Scottish professional footballer who played as an outside right.

Born in Slamannan but raised in Larkhall, Bennie began his Scottish Football League career in 1920 with Albion Rovers, where he gradually displaced Bill Ribchester in the side, before moving to England to join Burnley in 1923. A year later, he moved to Bradford City, featuring for three seasons before retiring due to injury.

He was a member of a footballing family: his father, Peter, and uncle John had short careers in Scotland, another uncle Bob played for Newcastle United, and his cousin Bob was a Scottish international.
