= Willie Walker (Queen's Park footballer) =

Scottish footballer

Personal information
- Full name: William Fulton Walker
- Date of birth: 1888
- Place of birth: Paisley, Scotland
- Date of death: 1974 (aged 85–86)
- Place of death: Paisley, Scotland
- Position: Centre forward

Senior career*
Years	Team	Apps	(Gls)
1911–1914	Queen's Park	23	(9)
- * Club domestic league appearances and goals

William Fulton Walker (1888–1974) was a Scottish amateur footballer who played as a centre forward in the Scottish League for Queen's Park.

== Personal life ==
Walker's brothers Jim and Frank were also Queen's Park footballers. Prior to the First World War, Walker worked for the Todd & Walker law firm in Paisley. During the war, he served as a second lieutenant in the Argyll and Sutherland Highlanders and was wounded in May 1917.

== Career statistics ==
Appearances and goals by club, season and competition
Club	Season	League			Scottish Cup		Other		Total	
Club	Season	Division	Apps	Goals	Apps	Goals	Apps	Goals	Apps	Goals
Queen's Park	1911–12	Scottish Division One	4	1	0	0	0	0	4	1
Queen's Park	1912–13	Scottish Division One	13	7	1	2	1 (Note: Appearance in Glasgow Merchants Charity Cup)	0	15	9
Queen's Park	1913–14	Scottish Division One	3	0	0	0	0	0	3	0
Queen's Park	1914–15	Scottish Division One	3	1	―		1 (Note: Appearance in Glasgow Cup)	0	4	1
Career total			23	9	1	2	2	0	26	11
