= John Brown (footballer, born 1915) =

Scottish footballer

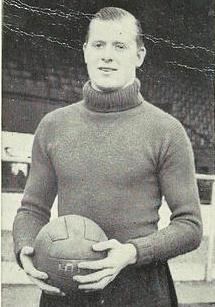

Personal information
- Full name: John Bell Brown
- Date of birth: 21 February 1915
- Place of birth: Troon, Scotland
- Date of death: 30 August 2005 (aged 90)
- Place of death: Prestwick, Scotland
- Position: Goalkeeper

Senior career*
| Years | Team | Apps | (Gls) |
| –1934 | Glenburn Rovers | | |
| 1934–1935 | Shawfield | | |
| 1935–1942 | Clyde | 129 | (0) |
| 1942–1948 | Hibernian | 12 | (0) |
| 1948–1949 | Dundee | 14 | (0) |
| 1949–1950 | Kilmarnock | 1 | (0) |

International career
| 1935 | Scotland Juniors | 3 | (0) |
| 1938 | Scottish League XI | 1 | (0) |
| 1938 | Scotland | 1 | (0) |
| 1940 | Scotland (wartime) | 1 | (0) |
- * Club domestic league appearances and goals

John Bell Brown (21 February 1915 – 30 August 2005) was a Scottish footballer, who played as a goalkeeper. At club level he played for Clyde, Hibernian, Dundee and Kilmarnock, helping Clyde win the Scottish Cup in 1939. He also played once for the Scotland national football team, in a 1939 British Home Championship match against Wales.

Brown's football career was clearly interrupted by the Second World War, as his two greatest achievements, winning a Scotland cap and the Scottish Cup, came during the last season completed before the war. Brown only conceded one goal in the whole competition en route to winning the Scottish Cup, a penalty kick in a 4–1 win against Rangers. He later complained that he would not have conceded even that solitary goal if Rangers had used their regular penalty taker, Bob McPhail, because Brown knew where McPhail normally placed his penalties. A transfer to Arsenal was proposed, but did not materialise due to the outbreak of war in September 1939.

During the war he entered the service of the Royal Navy, while making guest appearances for Hamilton Academical. He transferred to Hibernian in 1942, but played for teams including St Mirren, Airdrieonians and Gillingham of England's Kent League between 1944 and 1946. Upon returning to Hibernian, he helped them win the Scottish league championship in 1947–48.

Brown then had spells with Dundee and Kilmarnock before retiring as a player in 1950. He then became a physiotherapist, working for Kilmarnock, the All Blacks and the Scotland national rugby union team. Brown was the first person to serve in that function for the Scotland rugby side.

At junior level, while at Glenburn, Brown was a reserve for the national team, and played in the annual West v East of Scotland international trial. After he moved to Shawfield, Brown won all three of his Scotland Juniors caps in 1935.

Brown was part of a sizeable sporting family. His sons Peter and Gordon (Broon frae Troon) both played for Scotland at rugby union, while two of his brothers, Tom and Jim, also played professional football, as did an uncle by marriage, Alex Lambie. Jim was selected by the United States for the 1930 FIFA World Cup, and in turn his son George later also played for the USA (although born in England and raised in Scotland). Brown himself was also a talented player of both badminton and golf, playing off a scratch handicap.

== Honours ==
Clyde

- Scottish Cup: 1938–39
- Paisley Charity Cup: 1939, 1940

Hibernian

- Scottish A Division: 1947–48

Scotland

- British Home Championship: 1938–39
