= Tommy Callaghan (footballer, born 1969) =

Scottish footballer (born 1969)

Personal information
- Date of birth: 28 August 1969 (age 57)
- Place of birth: Glasgow, Scotland
- Position: Midfielder

Youth career
- Aston Villa

Senior career*
Years	Team	Apps	(Gls)
1987–1989	St Mirren	0	(0)
1988–1989	→ Kilmarnock (loan)	11	(0)
1989–1990	Falkirk	10	(1)
1990–1992	Kilmarnock	116	(6)
1992	East Fife	4	(0)
1992–1995	Stirling Albion	62	(4)
1995–1996	Stranraer	25	(0)
1996	Dunfermline	3	(0)
1996–1997	Livingston	64	(2)
1997–1998	Ross County	8	(1)
1998–2000	Partick Thistle	34	(0)
- * Club domestic league appearances and goals

Tommy Callaghan (born 28 August 1969) is a Scottish former footballer who played as a midfielder.

== Playing career ==
=== Aston Villa ===
He was in the youth ranks at Aston Villa, but never made a first team appearance for the club.

=== St Mirren and Kilmarnock ===
Callaghan began his professional career playing for St Mirren. He spent the 1988–1989 season on loan at Kilmarnock, but ultimately departed St Mirren without making a single first team appearance for the club.

=== Falkirk ===
Callaghan signed for Falkirk in 1989, as part of a swap deal which saw Roddy Manley move to St Mirren. He appeared 10 times for the Bairns, scoring 1 goal.

=== East Fife ===
The midfielder then signed for East Fife in a brief spell which saw him make just 4 appearances for the Fifers.

=== Stirling Albion ===
Callaghan signed for Stirling Albion in 1992 and enjoyed a three year spell at the club, racking up 62 appearances for the Binos.

=== Stranraer ===
He was on the move again in 1995, and arrived at Stranraer. Callaghan appeared 25 times for the Stair Park club before departing at the end of the 1995–1996 season.

=== Dunfermline ===
Another short spell followed, this time at Dunfermline. The midfielder made just three appearances during the 1995–1996 season before leaving the Pars at the end of the season.

=== Livingston ===
Callaghan signed for Livingston, who were recently renamed and relocated to West Lothian. He scored four goals in 64 appearances for the club during the 1996–1997 season and was on the move again in the summer.

=== Ross County and Partick Thistle ===
The midfielder saw out the last three seasons of his playing career with Ross County and Partick Thistle before retiring and joining the coaching staff at Firhill.

== Post-playing career ==
After retiring, he joined the Partick Thistle under 18's coaching staff.

He later became a football agent.

== Personal life ==
His father Tommy Callaghan played for Celtic. His uncle Willie played for Dunfermline and Scotland. His grandfather William, maternal great-uncles Patrick Flannigan and David Flannigan, cousin Willie Callaghan Jr, and nephew Liam Callaghan all played football to some extent.
