= Stewart Williamson (Scottish footballer) =

Scottish Footballer

Personal information
- Date of birth: 10 December 1961 (age 64)
- Place of birth: Lasswade, Scotland
- Position: Defender

Senior career*
Years	Team	Apps	(Gls)
1982–1988	Cowdenbeath	174	(8)
1988–1995	Meadowbank Thistle	207	(7)
1995–1998	Livingston	93	(3)
1998	Oakley United		
- * Club domestic league appearances and goals

Stewart Williamson (born 10 December 1961) is a Scottish former professional footballer who played as a defender for Cowdenbeath, Meadowbank Thistle and Livingston.

== Club career ==
Williamson played for Cowdenbeath, Meadowbank Thistle and then Livingston after the team relocated in 1995, making 300 Scottish Football League appearances for the two 'entities' combined. 207 of these came in a seven-year spell at Meadowbank, with a further 93 after the move. He spent the latter part of his career combining player and assistant manager roles in the Junior leagues with Glenrothes and Tayport.
