= Tom Findlay =

Scottish footballer

Personal information
- Full name: Thomas Findlay
- Date of birth: 2 January 1881
- Place of birth: Kilmarnock, Scotland
- Position: Inside left

Senior career*
Years	Team	Apps	(Gls)
–	Kilmarnock Rugby XI		
1901–1904	Kilmarnock	26	(5)
1904	Morton	0	(0)
1904–1906	Motherwell	37	(15)
1906–1908	Hibernian	40	(9)
1908	→ Kilmarnock (loan)	3	(1)
1908–1911	Port Glasgow Athletic	71	(9)
1911	→ Albion Rovers (loan)	1	(0)
1911–1912	Nithsdale Wanderers		
Total		178	(39)
- * Club domestic league appearances and goals

Thomas Findlay (born 2 January 1881) was a Scottish footballer who played mainly as an inside left for clubs including Kilmarnock, Motherwell and Port Glasgow Athletic – at all three, his elder brother Robert was among his teammates. With Port Glasgow, he was a Renfrewshire Cup winner in 1909. He also featured for Hibernian (scoring the winner for the club in the 1906 Rosebery Charity Cup final), Morton (two Scottish Cup appearances only), Albion Rovers and Nithsdale Wanderers.
