= Robert Reilly (footballer) =

Scottish footballer

Personal information
- Full name: Robert Reilly
- Date of birth: 23 September 1959 (age 67)
- Place of birth: Kilmarnock, Scotland
- Position: Midfielder

Senior career*
Years	Team	Apps	(Gls)
1979–1981	Ayr United	15	(5)
1981–1987	Clyde	168	(28)
1987	Hamilton Academical	7	(1)
1987–1988	Airdrieonians	29	(1)
1988–1989	Meadowbank Thistle	24	(3)
1989–1991	Kilmarnock	74	(8)
1991–1994	Stirling Albion	85	(8)
1994–1996	Stranraer	48	(2)
1996–1997	Albion Rovers	17	(1)
1997	Queen's Park	1	(0)
1997–1998	Dumbarton	14	(2)
Total		482	(59)
- * Club domestic league appearances and goals

Robert Reilly (born 23 September 1959) is a Scottish former football midfielder.

Reilly played with 11 Scottish clubs during his career, his most notable spell came arguably whilst playing for Clyde, where he made 168 appearances, scoring 28 goals.
