= Willie Watters =

Scottish footballer

Personal information
- Full name: William Devlin Watters
- Date of birth: 5 June 1964 (age 62)
- Place of birth: Bellshill, Scotland
- Position: Forward

Youth career
- Morrison YMCA

Senior career*
| Years | Team | Apps | (Gls) |
| 1985–1986 | Hamilton Academical | 11 | (3) |
| 1986–1988 | Clyde | 48 | (13) |
| 1987–1989 | St Johnstone | 36 | (20) |
| 1988–1991 | Kilmarnock | 67 | (37) |
| 1990–1991 | Queen of the South | 19 | (4) |
| 1991–1996 | Stirling Albion | 148 | (56) |
| 1995–1996 | Alloa Athletic | 4 | (1) |
| 1995–1997 | Arbroath | 33 | (7) |
| 1996–1998 | Albion Rovers | 59 | (24) |
| 1998–2000 | Stenhousemuir | 48 | (10) |
| 1999–2000 | Dumbarton | 9 | (2) |
| Total | | 482 | (177) |
- * Club domestic league appearances and goals

William Devlin Watters (born 5 June 1964) is a Scottish retired footballer who played for Hamilton Academical, Clyde, St Johnstone, Kilmarnock, Queen of the South, Stirling Albion, Alloa Athletic, Arbroath, Albion Rovers, Stenhousemuir and Dumbarton. Outside football, Watters worked as a carpet fitter.
