= Grant McMartin =

Scottish footballer

Personal information
- Date of birth: 31 December 1970 (age 55)
- Place of birth: Linlithgow, Scotland
- Position: Midfielder

Youth career
- –1989: Dunipace

Senior career*
Years	Team	Apps	(Gls)
1989–1993	Dundee	53	(2)
1993–1995	St Johnstone	28	(3)
1995–1998	Livingston	110	(6)
1998–2000	Stranraer	30	(2)
2000–2001	Berwick Rangers	22	(0)
Total		243	(13)
- * Club domestic league appearances and goals as of 9 May 2007

Grant McMartin (born 31 December 1970) is a Scottish former professional footballer.

A midfielder, Linlithgow-born McMartin began his career with Dundee in 1989. In five years at Dens Park, he made 53 league appearances and scored two goals.

In 1993, he joined Dundee's Tayside rivals St Johnstone and went on to make 28 appearances for the McDiarmid Park club, scoring three times.

His next move, in 1995, was to Livingston. In four years with Livi he made 110 appearances, finding the net on six occasions.

McMartin joined Stranraer in 1998, with whom he remained for two years before moving to his final club, Berwick Rangers. He retired in 2001.
