= Richard Sharp (footballer) =

Scottish footballer

Personal information
- Full name: Richard Sharp
- Date of birth: 26 January 1956 (age 70)
- Place of birth: Glasgow, Scotland
- Position: Forward

Youth career
- Bargeddie Amateurs

Senior career*
Years	Team	Apps	(Gls)
1974–1975	Rangers	0	(0)
1975–1976	Greenock Morton	16	(0)
1976–1977	Kilmarnock	13	(0)
1977–1979	St Mirren	8	(0)
1978–1980	Dunfermline Athletic	32	(6)
1980–1982	East Stirlingshire	41	(4)
- * Club domestic league appearances and goals

Richard "Ricky" Sharp (born 26 January 1956) was a Scottish professional footballer who is best known for his time with Dunfermline Athletic and Kilmarnock.

== Football career ==
Sharp joined Rangers on 6 April 1974 from Bargeddie Amateurs. He made one appearance for the club during a Scottish League Cup match against Hibernian, on 10 August 1974. Sharp was substituted (replaced by Jim Denny), with Rangers losing 0–3 at half time and he never played for the club again.

He moved on to Morton shortly afterwards. On 17 January 1976, Sharp left Morton and joined Kilmarnock before moving on to St Mirren eighteen months later in September 1977. Sharp had subsequent spells with Dunfermline Athletic and East Stirlingshire respectively.

== Later career ==
Sharp retired from professional football in 1982 and joined Strathclyde Police.

== Personal life ==
Sharp has one older brother (Andrew) and one younger brother, former Everton and Scotland striker Graeme.
