= Lee Bailey =

Scottish footballer

Personal information
- Date of birth: 10 July 1972 (age 54)
- Place of birth: Edinburgh, Scotland
- Position: Forward

Youth career
- Tynecastle Boys Club

Senior career*
Years	Team	Apps	(Gls)
1991–1992	Hibernian	1	(0)
1992–1995	Meadowbank Thistle	101	(24)
1995–1998	Livingston	69	(17)
1998–2000	Queen of the South	33	(2)
2000–2001	Brechin City	38	(5)
2001	Stirling Albion	10	(0)
2001–2002	East Fife	30	(5)
- Bonnyrigg Rose Athletic
Total		282	(53)
- * Club domestic league appearances and goals

Lee Bailey (born 10 July 1972) is a Scottish professional footballer, who played in the Scottish Football League for Hibernian, Meadowbank Thistle, Livingston, Queen of the South, Brechin City, Stirling Albion and East Fife.

He made one appearance for Hibernian in the Premier Division, but was then released. Bailey then went on to play for Meadowbank, where he played more than 100 games, and stayed with the club when it relocated to Livingston. He was playing for Brechin City, a part-time club, when they were drawn to play Rangers in the 2000–01 Scottish Cup. Bailey was also working as a driving instructor at that time.

In June 2015, Bailey was appointed assistant manager of Brechin City. At that time, Bailey was also working for the Fife Football Performance Academy.
