= Tom Brandon (footballer, born 1893) =

English footballer (1893–1956)

Personal information
- Full name: William Thomas Brandon
- Date of birth: 25 May 1893
- Place of birth: Blackburn, England
- Date of death: 1 May 1956 (aged 62)
- Position: Full back

Senior career*
Years	Team	Apps	(Gls)
1909–1910	Blackburn Rovers	0	(0)
1910	Rossendale United		
1910	Darwen		
1911–1913	South Liverpool		
1913	West Ham United		
1919–1920	Bristol Rovers		
1920–1922	Hull City	56	(3)
1922–1925	Bradford Park Avenue	85	(0)
1925–1926	Wigan Borough	8	(0)
1926	Bootle Borough		
Total		149	(3)
- * Club domestic league appearances and goals

William Thomas Brandon (25 May 1893 – 1 May 1956) was an English footballer who played in the Football League for Bradford Park Avenue, Hull City and Wigan Borough. His father of the same name was a professional footballer (and a Scottish international) and several uncles also played the game, including FA Cup winner Harry Brandon.
