= Dave Elliott (footballer, born 1968) =

Scottish footballer

Personal information
- Full name: David Elliott
- Date of birth: 10 December 1968 (age 57)
- Place of birth: Glasgow, Scotland
- Position: Forward

Senior career*
| Years | Team | Apps | (Gls) |
| –1986 | Hamilton Thistle | | |
| 1986–1990 | Queen's Park | 97 | (11) |
| 1990–1992 | Kilmarnock | 22 | (1) |
| 1992–1994 | East Fife | 23 | (3) |
- Largs Thistle
- * Club domestic league appearances and goals

David Elliott (born 10 December 1968) is a Scottish retired football forward who played in the Scottish League for Queen's Park, East Fife and Kilmarnock.
