= Abraham Wales (footballer, born 1907) =

Scottish footballer

Personal information
- Date of birth: 4 October 1907
- Place of birth: Kilwinning, Scotland
- Date of death: 24 July 1976 (aged 68)
- Place of death: Kilwinning, Scotland
- Position: Inside right

Senior career*
Years	Team	Apps	(Gls)
- Baillieston Juniors
- Bathgate
- Bartonholm United
- Kilwinning Rangers
1929–1931	Kilmarnock	14	(9)
1930	→ Galston (loan)		
1931	Montrose	9	(2)
1931–1932	Luton Town	3	(0)
1932	→ Kilwinning Eglinton (loan)		
1932–1933	Leicester City		
1933–1934	Queen of the South	4	(1)
- Scottish Aviation
Total		30+	(12+)
- * Club domestic league appearances and goals

Abraham Wales (4 October 1907 – 24 July 1976) was a Scottish professional footballer who played as an inside right.

== Career ==
Wales played for Baillieston Juniors, Bathgate, Bartonholm United, Kilwinning Rangers, Kilmarnock, Galston, Montrose, Luton Town, Kilwinning Eglinton, Leicester City, Queen of the South and Scottish Aviation.
