= Jason Young (footballer, born 1972) =

Scottish footballer

Personal information
- Date of birth: 1 March 1972 (age 54)
- Place of birth: Edinburgh, Scotland
- Position: Forward

Youth career
- Salvesen BC
- Heart of Midlothian

Senior career*
Years	Team	Apps	(Gls)
1991–1993	Meadowbank Thistle	27	(2)
1993–1995	VfB Wissen		
1995	Meadowbank Thistle	14	(2)
1995–1998	Livingston	95	(27)
1998–2000	Stranraer	38	(3)
2000–2003	Bonnyrigg Rose		
2003–2006	Penicuik Athletic		
- * Club domestic league appearances and goals

Jason Young (born 1 March 1972) is a Scottish former footballer who played as a forward for Heart of Midlothian, Meadowbank VFB Wissen (German third tier) Stranraer, Livingston, and Bonnyrigg Rose.

== Career ==
=== Youth ===
Young came through the youth academies of Salvesen Boys Club and Hearts. He spent three seasons at Tynecastle Park but left the club without making a single first team appearance.Jason played for Hearts in the 1991 soccer sixes squad that won the title in 1991 beating Motherwell in the final.Jason also played for Scotland school boys under 16's team

=== Senior ===
The striker signed for Meadowbank Thistle in 1991 and enjoyed two seasons in Edinburgh before making a move to VfB Wissen in Germany in the third tier. There he spent another two seasons, but failed to become a regular starter in the side.

Young returned to Scotland in January 1995 and re-signed with Meadowbank Thistle. He was to go on to write his name into the history books when his side moved to the new town of Livingston in 1995: Young scored Livingston's first ever goal, in a 2–0 Scottish League Cup win over Montrose at Links Park on 5 August 1995.Also he scored a famous first ever goal at the following week at the almondvale stadium in a win versus East Stirlingshire in front of a full capacity crowd . Also he won the prestigious award of third division player of the year voted by his fellow professionals in his prolific goal scoring season with 21 goals.

After Livi were bought by new owners with a big investment, Young found himself out of the team and soon moved to Stranraer. He made 38 appearances for the Blues and scored 3 goals, including a memorable goal against Hibernian in August 1998.

Young finished his career with spells at Bonnyrigg Rose and Penicuik Athletic before retiring from playing in 2006.

== Personal life ==
Jason is the son of former Hearts and Everton player Alex Young.
