= Tom Brown (footballer, born 1919) =

Scottish footballer

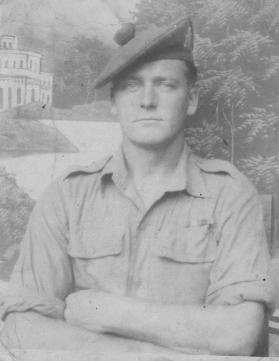

Personal information
- Full name: Thomas Brown
- Date of birth: 26 October 1919
- Place of birth: Troon, Scotland
- Date of death: May 2000 (aged 80)
- Place of death: Ipswich, England
- Position: Goalkeeper

Senior career*
Years	Team	Apps	(Gls)
- Cumnock Juniors
1938	Glenafton Athletic		
1938–1951	Ipswich Town	111	(0)
1951–1952	Bury Town	0	(0)
- * Club domestic league appearances and goals

Thomas Brown (26 October 1919 – May 2000) was a Scottish professional footballer who played as a goalkeeper and spent most of his career with Ipswich Town. He was also a Commando during World War II.

== Youth ==
Born in Troon, Brown was born the youngest of four brothers, three of whom played professionally. His oldest brother Jim began his career in the United States and was a member of the U.S. national team at the 1930 FIFA World Cup before retiring from Clyde F.C. in 1941. His brother John was a Scottish international goalkeeper who played for Hibs and Clyde, and won the 1939 Scottish FA Cup with Clyde. Each of the brothers apparently left school at a young age to become apprentice riveters at Troon Shipyard. While working as a riveter, Brown also began his football career with Cumnock Juniors before moving to Glenafton Athletic at nearby New Cumnock in June 1938.

== Professional ==
In October 1938, Glenafton Athletic transferred Brown to Ipswich Town. Despite Brown being am amateur Ipswich sent Glenafton a 'handsome cheque'. However, World War II soon intervened and Brown went to work as a riveter in the Troon Shipyard, along with his three brothers. At the time, Brown's oldest brother Jim, who had recently retired from Clyde F.C., was an outspoken union activist. The four brothers were exempt from the draft as members of an essential war time industry. However, Jim's union activities led to the Troon Shipyard management removing the brothers' draft exemptions. To avoid the draft, John joined the Navy and Tom became a Commando. Their brother Jim was found to be physically exempt from military service due to punctured eardrums. In 1946, Tom returned to Ipswich Town, seeing time in only one first team game. However, he gained the starting position during the 1947–1948 season and held that until 1950. During the 1950–1951 season, he played only three first team games and in August 1951, Brown left Ipswich and moved to Bury Town where he finished his career.
