= Abraham Wales (footballer, born 1874) =

Scottish footballer

Personal information
- Date of birth: 14 June 1874
- Place of birth: Bridgeton, Scotland
- Position: Inside left

Senior career*
| Years | Team | Apps | (Gls) |
| 1898–1900 | Motherwell | 15 | (9) |
| 1900–1902 | Third Lanark | 18 | (1) |
| 1900 | → Motherwell (loan) | 3 | (0) |
| 1901–1902 | → Motherwell (loan) | 17 | (2) |
| 1902–1903 | Motherwell | 19 | (1) |
| 1903 | Morton | 18 | (2) |
| 1904 | Fulham | | |
| 1904–1905 | Morton | 3 | (0) |
| 1905–1906 | Luton Town | | |
- * Club domestic league appearances and goals

Abraham Wales (born 14 June 1874) was a Scottish professional footballer who played as an inside left.

== Career ==
Born in Bridgeton, Wales played for Motherwell, Third Lanark, Morton, Fulham and Luton Town.
