= Paul Flexney =

Scottish footballer

Personal information
- Full name: Paul Flexney
- Date of birth: 18 January 1965 (age 61)
- Place of birth: Glasgow, Scotland
- Position: Defender

Youth career
- 1980–1982: Clyde

Senior career*
Years	Team	Apps	(Gls)
1982–1988	Clyde	204	(14)
1988–1989	Northampton Town	12	(0)
1989–1992	Kilmarnock	113	(4)
Total		329	(18)
- * Club domestic league appearances and goals

Paul Flexney (born 18 January 1965) is a Scottish retired professional footballer who played as a defender.

Flexney started his career with Clyde, making over 200 appearances for the side. He was capped by Scotland at various youth levels, and was captain for a period during his time at Clyde.

He later played for Northampton Town and Kilmarnock (one season in the Second Division, three in the First Division) before dropping out of the senior game.

He is married to Janice and has one son, Jack, who as of 2019 was following in his father's footsteps towards becoming a professional footballer but was required to undergo brain surgery for cancerous tumours.
