= John Sludden =

Scottish footballer (1964–2021)

Personal information
- Date of birth: 29 December 1964
- Place of birth: Falkirk, Scotland
- Date of death: 7 May 2021 (aged 56)
- Position: Striker

Youth career
- Gairdoch United BC

Senior career*
Years	Team	Apps	(Gls)
1980–1983	Celtic	0	(0)
1983–1985	St Johnstone	33	(6)
1985–1986	Airdrieonians	9	(0)
1985–1989	Ayr United	140	(78)
1989–1991	Kilmarnock	48	(15)
1991–1993	East Fife	71	(34)
1993	Clydebank	1	(0)
1993–1994	Clyde	17	(4)
1994–1995	Stenhousemuir	23	(14)
1995–2001	Bo'ness United		
Total		342	(151)

Managerial career
- 1995–2001: Bo'ness United
- 2014–2016: Camelon Juniors
- 2016–2018: East Stirlingshire
- * Club domestic league appearances and goals

John Sludden (29 December 1964 – 7 May 2021) was a Scottish footballer and manager. He played as a striker for several clubs in the Scottish Football League, and was also manager of East Stirlingshire in the Lowland League.

== Playing career ==
On 7 June 1980, Sludden played for Scotland versus England at Wembley Stadium in the Schoolboy International that was shown live on TV, scoring two goals in the team's 5–4 win, with Paul McStay also scoring two goals and Ally Dick the other goal. England's Paul Rideout scored a hat-trick in the match.

Sludden then signed for Celtic on the same day that McStay signed for the Parkhead club. Sludden played only once for the first-team in a Glasgow Cup Final versus Rangers in 1982. Sludden joined Leeds United on trial in May 1983 but failed to secure a contract. Sludden then signed for Perth club St Johnstone before signing for Airdrieonians and Ayr United. John scored the last ever goal at St Johnstone's Muirton Park before Saints moved to their current McDiarmid Park home, playing for Ayr as they triumphed 1-0 in the ground's final game. Whilst at Somerset Park under the club's manager Ally MacLeod, Sludden was part of a talented attack-minded team, alongside players such as Henry Templeton. In the 1987–88 season the "Honest Men" won the Second Division Championship as Sludden scored 31 league goals.

Sludden then left the South Ayrshire club for East Ayrshire rivals Kilmarnock, then later played for East Fife, Clydebank, Clyde and Stenhousemuir.

== Coaching career ==
Sludden was appointed player-manager of Junior club Bo'ness United in 1995 and resigned in October 2001. Sludden was later involved in youth development at Celtic. Sludden was then appointed manager of Camelon Juniors in April 2014. On 13 June 2015, Camelon won the Fife and Lothians Cup in a 1–0 win versus Sauchie Juniors before departing Camelon on 7 May 2016. Later that same month, Sludden was confirmed as manager of East Stirlingshire, following their relegation to the Lowland League. On 30 August 2018, Sludden was relieved of his position.

== Personal life ==
Sludden had two sons, Marc who played for Stenhousemuir and Paul who played for Falkirk.

On 7 May 2021, Sludden died at the age of 56.
