= Willie Callaghan (footballer, born 1943) =

Scottish footballer (1943–2026)

Personal information
- Full name: William Thomas Callaghan
- Date of birth: 12 February 1943
- Place of birth: Cowdenbeath, Scotland
- Date of death: 19 September 2026 (aged 83)
- Position: Right-back

Senior career*
Years	Team	Apps	(Gls)
1961–1972	Dunfermline Athletic	286	(3)
1972–1974	Berwick Rangers	43	(5)
1975–1976	Cowdenbeath	6	(0)
Total		335	(8)

International career
1967–1970	Scotland	6	(0)
1968–1970	Scottish League XI	4	(0)
- * Club domestic league appearances and goals

William Thomas Callaghan (12 February 1943 – 19 September 2026) was a Scottish professional footballer, who played as a right-back for Dunfermline Athletic, Berwick Rangers, Cowdenbeath and the Scotland national team. Callaghan played for Dunfermline for most of his club career, playing in two Scottish Cup finals, losing 3–2 to Celtic in 1965 and winning 3–1 against Heart of Midlothian in 1968. In all he made 426 appearances for the Pars, including 34 in European competition, a club record. Willie's brother Tommy Callaghan also played for Dunfermline, and they are the last pair of brothers to have played the full 90 minutes together in the same Scottish Cup-winning side as of 2009. In 2008, Callaghan was inducted into Dunfermline Athletic's hall of fame.

Callaghan represented the full Scotland national team six times between 1967 and 1970. He first played for Scotland during an overseas tour in 1967, when several players were unavailable due to their clubs being involved in European competition. The Scottish Football Association decided in October 2021 to reclassify some of these games as full internationals, which increased his cap tally from two to six. Callaghan's appearance against Wales in 1970 was the last time that a Dunfermline Athletic player represented Scotland until Barry Nicholson and Stevie Crawford were selected for a match against Poland in 2001.

Willie's son, also named Willie, was a footballer who played for several league clubs in the 1980s and 1990s. His brother, Tommy Callaghan, played for Dunfermline and Celtic. His grandson, Liam Callaghan, had a trial spell with Birmingham City in November 2011.

Callaghan died on 19 September 2026, aged 83.

== Sources ==
- Smith, Paul (2013). Scotland Who's Who. Pitch Publishing. ISBN 9781909178847.
