= Willie Callaghan (footballer, born 1967) =

Scottish footballer (1967–2023)

Personal information
- Full name: William Thomas Callaghan
- Date of birth: 23 March 1967
- Place of birth: Dunfermline, Scotland
- Date of death: 13 April 2023 (aged 56)
- Position: Forward

Senior career*
Years	Team	Apps	(Gls)
1984–1985	Dunfermline Athletic	2	(0)
1985–1987	Halbeath		
1987–1990	Dunfermline Athletic	12	(0)
1989	→ Walsall (loan)	2	(1)
1989	→ Cowdenbeath (loan)	2	(3)
1989	→ Clyde (loan)	6	(0)
1990	→ Clyde (loan)	5	(2)
1990	→ Cowdenbeath (loan)	4	(0)
1990–1991	Kelty Hearts		
1991	Albion Rovers	1	(1)
1991–1992	Inverness Thistle		
1992–1993	Montrose	15	(1)
1993–1995	Cowdenbeath	83	(25)
1995	Meadowbank Thistle	7	(1)
1995–1998	Livingston	62	(7)
1999–2000	Partick Thistle	13	(0)
- Glenafton Athletic
- * Club domestic league appearances and goals

William Thomas Callaghan (23 March 1967 – 13 April 2023) was a Scottish professional footballer who played as a forward for Dunfermline Athletic, Walsall, Cowdenbeath, Clyde, Albion Rovers, Montrose, Meadowbank Thistle, Livingston and Partick Thistle in the Scottish and English leagues. He also played for Scottish Highland Football League Club, Inverness Thistle, and for three Scottish Junior Clubs respectively, Halbeath, Kelty Hearts and Glenafton Athletic.

== Personal life and death ==
Willie's father, also named Willie, was a footballer who played for Dunfermline and Scotland in the 1960s and 1970s. His son, Liam Callaghan, had a trial spell with Birmingham City in November 2011. His uncle, Tommy Callaghan, played for Dunfermline and Celtic.

Callaghan died on 13 April 2023, at the age of 56.
