= List of Scotland wartime international footballers =

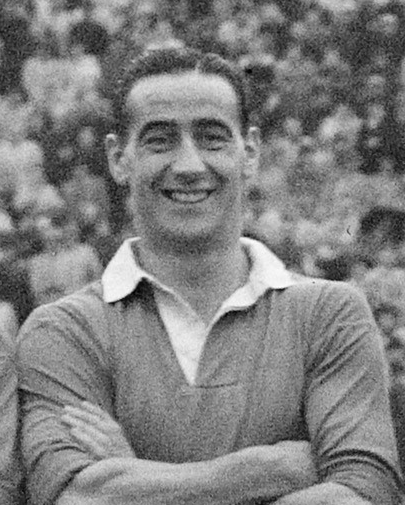
Tommy Walker (pictured in 1947) played regularly for Scotland during the Second World War.

The Scotland national football team is the joint-oldest international football team, having played in the first official international match, a goalless draw on 30 November 1872 against England. Since then, the team has established a long-standing rivalry with England, particularly in the annual British Home Championship, which Scotland won 24 times outright and shared a further 17 times. The team has enjoyed less success in continental and global competition. Even though Scotland has participated in eight FIFA World Cup and two UEFA European Championship final tournaments, the team has never progressed beyond the first round of any major tournament.

During the First World War (1914–18) and the Second World War (1939–45), competitive football was suspended for the duration of each war. Scotland played a number of "Wartime Internationals" against the other Home Nations during each conflict, none of which are considered to be official international matches. They also played Victory Internationals in the immediate aftermath of each war, although two of these (a 2–2 draw with Belgium on 23 January 1946 and a 3–1 win against Switzerland on 15 May 1946) are counted by the Scottish Football Association as official matches.

This list includes all Scotland players who appeared in these unofficial Wartime or Victory International matches. It does not include appearances in the matches played between Scotland representative teams and branches of the British Armed Forces which also took place during the course of the Second World War, nor the fixtures against Belgium and Switzerland in 1946.

== List of players ==
Name	Ref	Caps	Goals	First appearance	Last appearance	Notes
Jimmy Carabine		10	0	2 December 1939	16 October 1943	Also played in 3 official matches
Jimmy Caskie		10	1	2 December 1939	14 October 1944	
Jock Dodds		10	10	2 December 1939	2 February 1946	
Billy Liddell		10	3	18 April 1942	24 August 1946	Also played in 29 official matches
Tommy Walker		10	1	2 December 1939	14 October 1944	Also played in 21 official matches
Jerry Dawson		9	0	2 December 1939	17 April 1943	Also played in 14 official matches
Willie Waddell		8	1	18 April 1942	24 August 1946	Also played in 18 official matches
Bobby Brown		7	0	6 January 1945	13 April 1946	Also played in 5 official matches
Matt Busby		7	0	17 January 1942	14 April 1945	Also played in 1 official match
Archie Macaulay		7	0	6 January 1945	14 April 1945	Also played in 7 official matches
Bill Shankly		7	1	11 May 1940	17 April 1943	Also played in 5 official matches
Andy Black		6	5	17 January 1942	14 April 1945	Also played in 3 official matches
Jock Shaw		6	0	3 May 1941	24 August 1946	Also played in 6 official matches
Andy Beattie		5	0	8 February 1941	10 October 1942	Also played in 7 official matches
Billy Campbell		5	0	16 October 1943	24 August 1946	Also played in 5 official matches
Jimmy Stephen		5	0	19 February 1944	14 April 1945	Also played in 2 official matches
Bobby Baxter		4	0	2 December 1939	14 October 1944	Also played in 3 official matches
James Bowie		4	1	8 June 1918	3 May 1919	Also played in 2 official matches
Jimmy Brownlie		4	0	22 March 1919	3 May 1919	Also played in 16 official matches
Jimmy Dykes		4	0	8 February 1941	17 January 1942	Also played in 2 official matches
Torry Gillick		4	1	28 April 1940	16 October 1943	Also played in 5 official matches
Jimmy Gordon		4	0	22 March 1919	3 May 1919	Also played in 10 official matches
Jimmy McMullan		4	0	22 March 1919	3 May 1919	Also played in 16 official matches. Played for England in 1918 when they were short of players
George Paterson		4	0	6 January 1945	2 February 1946	Also played in 2 official matches
Alec McNair		4	0	8 June 1918	3 May 1919	Also played in 15 official matches
Alan Morton		4	1	8 June 1918	3 May 1919	Also played in 31 official matches
Bob Thyne		4	0	6 January 1945	3 February 1945	
Jimmy Blair		3	0	19 April 1919	3 May 1919	Also played in 8 official matches
Tommy Brown		3	0	2 December 1939	3 May 1941	
Joe Crozier		3	0	16 October 1943	22 April 1944	
Jimmy Delaney		3	2	22 April 1944	13 April 1946	Also played in 15 official matches
Alex Donaldson		3	0	22 March 1919	26 April 1919	Also played in 6 official matches
Willie Fagan		3	1	6 January 1945	3 February 1945	
George Hamilton		3	1	2 February 1946	24 August 1946	Also played in 5 official matches
Jim Harley		3	0	6 January 1945	14 April 1945	
Malky MacDonald		3	0	8 February 1941	22 April 1944	
Jimmy McMenemy		3	0	8 June 1918	3 May 1919	Also played in 12 official matches
Jimmy Smith		3	0	8 February 1941	4 October 1941	Also played in 2 official matches
Alex Venters		3	1	11 May 1940	17 April 1943	Also played in 3 official matches
Dougie Wallace		3	2	8 February 1941	17 April 1943	Born and raised in South Africa.
John Stewart Wright		3	1	8 June 1918	3 May 1919	
Gordon Bremner		2	0	18 April 1942	10 October 1942	
Frank Brennan		2	0	13 April 1946	24 August 1946	Also played in 8 official matches
Johnny Deakin		2	0	16 October 1943	10 November 1945	Also played in 1 official match
Neil Dougall		2	0	13 April 1946	24 August 1946	Also played in 1 official match
Jimmy Duncanson		2	0	19 February 1944	22 April 1944	Also played in 1 official match
Jackie Husband		2	0	13 April 1946	24 August 1946	Also played in 2 official matches
Frank Mennie		2	0	6 January 1945	7 January 1945	
Andy Paton		2	0	10 November 1945	2 February 1946	Also played in 3 official matches
James Reid		2	1	13 May 1916	3 May 1919	Also played in 3 official matches
James Richardson		2	0	19 April 1919	26 April 1919	
Davie Shaw		2	0	13 April 1946	24 August 1946	Also played in 9 official matches
Gordon Smith		2	0	14 October 1944	10 November 1945	Also played in 19 official matches
Andrew Wilson		2	4	22 March 1919	3 May 1919	Also played in 12 official matches
George Young		2	0	17 April 1943	16 October 1943	Also played in 53 official matches
Patrick Allan		1	0	13 May 1916		
Bobby Ancell		1	0	2 December 1939		Also played in 2 official matches
Sandy Archibald		1	1	8 June 1918		Also played in 8 official matches
Tommy Bogan		1	0	14 April 1945		
Bobby Bolt		1	0	28 April 1940		
George Brown		1	0	8 February 1941		Also played in 19 official matches
Jock Brown		1	0	28 April 1940		Also played in 1 official match
Willie Buchan		1	0	17 April 1943		
Tommy Cairns		1	0	19 April 1919		Also played in 8 official matches
Kenny Campbell		1	0	13 May 1916		Also played in 8 official matches
Ken Chisholm		1	0	2 February 1946		
Willie Corbett		1	0	10 October 1942		
Sammy Cox		1	0	7 January 1945		Also played in 25 official matches
William Cringan		1	0	22 March 1919		Also played in 5 official matches
Johnny Crosbie		1	0	19 April 1919		Also played in 2 official matches
David Cumming		1	0	14 October 1944		Also played in 1 official match
George Cummings		1	0	14 October 1944		Also played in 9 official matches
Percy Dawson		1	0	13 May 1916		Born and raised in England, played in Scotland for three years (Hearts, 1911 to 1914)
Neil Dewar		1	1	28 April 1940		Also played in 3 official matches
Jimmy Dougal		1	1	11 May 1940		Also played in 1 official match
Bobby Finan		1	0	2 December 1939		
Bobby Flavell		1	0	19 February 1944		Also played in 1 official match
Jimmy Frew		1	0	13 May 1916		
Patsy Gallacher		1	0	8 June 1918		Also played in 12 official matches for Ireland and 1 for the Irish Free State. Born in Ireland, raised in Scotland from a young age.
Jimmy Galt		1	1	13 May 1916		Also played in 2 official matches
John Harris		1	0	14 April 1945		(Note: John Harris, then of Wolverhampton, and 'Tony' Harris (John Robert Harris), then of Queen's Park, both played in the same match; the London Hearts website incorrectly labelled the Wolves player's profile with the 'Tony' forename.)
Tony Harris		1	0	14 April 1945		
Billy Henry		1	0	13 May 1916		
Alec Herd		1	0	18 April 1942		
Bobby Hogg		1	0	8 February 1941		Also played in 1 official match
Charlie Johnston		1	0	17 January 1942		
Leslie Johnston		1	1	14 April 1945		Also played in 2 official matches
Sammy Kean		1	0	17 April 1943		
John Kelly		1	0	14 April 1945		Also played in 2 official matches
Willie Kilmarnock		1	0	19 February 1944		
Jimmy Kirk		1	0	28 April 1940		
Jock Kirton		1	0	19 February 1944		
Alec Linwood		1	0	16 October 1943		Also played in 1 official match
Adam Little		1	0	16 October 1943		
James Logan		1	0	13 May 1916		
Willie Lyon		1	0	28 April 1940		Born in England, raised in Scotland from a young age.
Duncan McClure		1	0	11 May 1940		
David McCulloch		1	0	11 May 1940		Also played in 7 official matches
Jimmy McGowan		1	0	2 February 1946		Also played in 1 official match
Peter McKennan		1	1	28 April 1940		
David McLean		1	1	8 June 1918		Also played in 1 official match
William McNamee		1	0	19 April 1919		
Malcolm McPhail		1	0	19 April 1919		
Jim McPhie		1	0	10 November 1945		
Robert McSkimming		1	0	8 June 1918		
Alex McSpadyen		1	0	28 April 1940		Also played in 2 official matches
Archie Miller		1	0	16 October 1943		Also played in 1 official match
George Miller		1	0	22 March 1919		
Willie Miller		1	0	24 August 1946		Also played in 6 official matches
Arthur Milne		1	1	14 October 1944		
Jackie Milne		1	0	8 February 1941		Also played in 2 official matches
Charlie Napier		1	0	2 December 1939		Also played in 5 official matches
Peter Nellies		1	0	8 June 1918		Also played in 2 official matches
Jackie Oakes		1	0	6 January 1945		
Robert Orr		1	0	22 March 1919		
Tommy Pearson		1	0	6 January 1945		Also played in 2 official matches Played for England in 1939 when they were short of players
Henry Pinkerton		1	0	2 December 1939		
Willie Reid		1	0	13 May 1916		Also played in 9 official matches
Willie Robb		1	0	8 June 1918		Also played in 2 official matches
James Scott		1	1	13 May 1916		
Tom Smith		1	0	18 April 1942		Also played in 2 official matches
Jimmy Stenhouse		1	0	19 February 1944		
Willie Thornton		1	2	24 August 1946		Also played in 8 official matches
Ned Weir		1	0	28 April 1940		Also played in 1 official match for Ireland (IFA) and 3 for the Éire (FAI). Born in Ireland, raised in Scotland from a young age.
Stan Williams		1	0	4 October 1941		Born and raised in South Africa.
Willie Wilson		1	0	13 May 1916		

== See also ==
- Association football during World War I
- Association football during World War II
- Scotland national football team results (unofficial matches)
