= 1940–41 in Scottish football =

Southern League champions
- Rangers

Summer Cup winners
- Hibernian

Southern League Cup winners
- Rangers

Junior Cup winners
- Glasgow Perthshire

The 1940–41 season was the 68th season of competitive football in Scotland and the second season of special wartime football during World War II.

== Overview ==
Between 1939 and 1946 normal competitive football was suspended in Scotland. Many footballers signed up to fight in the war and as a result many teams were depleted, and fielded guest players instead. The Scottish Football League and Scottish Cup were suspended and in their place regional league competitions were set up. Appearances in these tournaments do not count in players' official records.

== Honours ==
League competition was played in the Southern League. No country-wide cup competition took place, although the Glasgow Cup and Renfrewshire Cup continued, and a Southern League Cup was also competed for, a competition which formed the basis of the League Cup.

Competition	Winner
Southern League	Rangers
Glasgow Cup	Celtic
Southern League Cup	Rangers
Summer Cup	Hibernian
Renfrewshire Cup	St Mirren

== International ==
Due to the war official international football was suspended and so officially the Scotland team was inactive. However unofficial internationals featuring scratch teams representing Scotland continued. Appearances in these matches are not, however, included in a players total international caps.

Scotland faced England in a wartime international on 8 February 1941 at St James' Park, Newcastle upon Tyne in front of 25,000 fans. Scotland won 3–2, their goals coming from a Joe Bacuzzi own goal and a brace from Dougie Wallace. The Scotland team that day comprised: Jerry Dawson, Bobby Hogg, Andy Beattie, Malky McDonald, Jimmy Dykes, George Brown, John Milne, Tommy Walker, Jimmy Smith, Dougie Wallace and Jimmy Caskie.

The two teams met again at Hampden Park, Glasgow on 3 May 1941 in front of a crowd of 78,000. This time Scotland suffered a 3–1 defeat, with their only goal coming from Alex Venters. The Scotland team that day comprised: Jerry Dawson, Jimmy Carabine, Jock Shaw, Bill Shankly, Jimmy Dykes, Tommy Brown, Torrance Gillick, Tommy Walker, Jimmy Smith, Alex Venters and Jimmy Caskie.

== See also ==
- Association football during World War II
