= Wales national football team results (unofficial matches) =

This article lists the results for the Wales during the First and Second World War. During this period no caps were awarded.

== 1914–19 ==
=== 1919 ===
11 October 1919 Victory International	Wales	2–1	England	Cardiff, Wales
	Meredith 22'; Wynn 85'	Report	Puddefoot 77'	Stadium: Ninian Park; Attendance: 20,000

18 October 1919 Victory International	England	2–0	Wales	Stoke-on-Trent, England
	Whittingham 6'; Smith 54'	Report		Stadium: Victoria Ground; Attendance: 16,000

== 1939–46 ==
=== 1939 ===
11 November 1939 Friendly	Wales	1–1	England	Ninian Park, Cardiff
15:00	Pat Glover (?)	Report	(?)	Attendance: 28,000; Referee: S Nicholas (Wales)

18 November 1939 Friendly	Wales	2–3	England	Racecourse Ground, Wrexham
	Dai Astley (?)	Report	(?) (?) (?)	Attendance: 17,000; Referee: S McCarthy (Wales)

=== 1940 ===
13 April 1940 Friendly	England	0–1	Wales	Wembley Stadium, London
		Report	(?) Bryn Jones	Attendance: 40,000; Referee: A J Jewell (England)

=== 1941 ===
26 April 1941 Friendly	England	4–1	Wales	City Ground, Nottingham
15:00	(?) (?) (?) (?)	Report	(?) Doug Witcomb	Attendance: 13,016; Referee: G Tedds (England)

7 June 1941 Friendly	Wales	2–3	England	Ninian Park, Cardiff
15:00	Vivian Woodward (?); Billy James (?)	Report	(?) (?) (?)	Attendance: 20,000; Referee: A Jones (Wales)

25 October 1941 Friendly	England	2–1	Wales	St Andrew's, Birmingham
	(?) (?)	Report	(?) Idris Hopkins	Attendance: 25,000; Referee: G S Blackhall (England)

=== 1942 ===
9 May 1942 Friendly	Wales	1–0	England	Ninian Park, Cardiff
15:00	Billy Lucas (?)	Report		Attendance: 33,000; Referee: W J Gow (England)

24 October 1942 Friendly	England	1–2	Wales	Molineux, Wolverhampton
	(?)	Report	(?) Horace Cumner	Attendance: 25,000; Referee: Capt. F C Green (England)

=== 1943 ===
27 February 1943 Friendly	England	5–3	Wales	Wembley Stadium, London
15:00	(?) (?) (?) (?) (?)	Report	(?) George Lowrie	Attendance: 75,000; Referee: G Reader (England)

8 May 1943 Friendly	Wales	1–1	England	Ninian Park, Cardiff
15:00	George Lowrie (?)	Report	(?)	Attendance: 25,000; Referee: T J Warren (Wales)

25 September 1943 Friendly	England	8–3	Wales	Wembley Stadium, London
	(?) (?) (?) (?) (?) (?) (?) (?)	Report	(?) Aubrey Powell (?) George Lowrie	Attendance: 80,000; Referee: C E Argent (England)

=== 1944 ===
6 May 1944 Friendly	Wales	0–2	England	Ninian Park, Cardiff
15:00		Report	(?) (?)	Attendance: 50,000; Referee: E Davies (Wales)

16 September 1944 Friendly	England	2–2	Wales	Anfield, Liverpool
	(?) (?)	Report	(?) Don Dearson (?) Billy Lucas	Attendance: 28,000; Referee: S Nicholas (Wales)

=== 1945 ===
5 May 1945 Friendly	Wales	2–3	England	Ninian Park, Cardiff
15:00	Horace Cumner (?); George Edwards (?)	Report	(?) (?) (?)	Attendance: 25,000^{[a]} Referee: W T Nash (Wales)

20 October 1945 BHC; Victory International	England	0–1	Wales	The Hawthorns, West Bromwich
		Report	(?) Aubrey Powell

10 November 1945 BHC; Victory International	Scotland	2–0	Wales	Hampden Park, Glasgow
	William Waddell (?); Jock Dodds (?)	Report

=== 1946 ===
4 May 1946 BHC; Victory International	Wales	0–1	Ireland	Ninian Park, Cardiff
		Report	(?) Paddy Sloan

== Notes ==
1. ^{a} Some sources report the total attendance as 40,000.

== Other unofficial matches ==
=== 1891 ===
21 September 1891 (Note: Part of a Canadian tour of the United Kingdom, also involving several players from the United States.)	Wales	1–1 (Note: Canada walked off after disputed Welsh equaliser)	Canada	Wrexham, Wales
16:45	J. Davies		Buckingham	Stadium: Racecourse Ground; Attendance: 500; Referee: James Davies

12 October 1891	Wales	2–1	Canada	Wrexham, Wales
	R. L. Jones; W. Lewis		Bowman	Stadium: Racecourse Ground; Attendance: 4,000; Referee: (England) R E Lythgoe

=== 1935 ===
11 May 1935 (Note: King George V Jubilee Trust Fund)	The Football League XI (England)	10–2	Wales-Ireland	Liverpool, England
	Hampson 5 Leyfield; Eastham 2 Geldard; Westwood		Astley 2	Stadium: Goodison Park; Attendance: 9,000; Referee: A Taylor & G Stephenson (Note: Trial of two-referee system.)

=== 1951 ===
3 December 1951 (Note: 75th anniversary of the Football Association of Wales.)	Wales	3–2	Rest of the UK	Cardiff
	Allchurch 15' 62'; Ford 23'	Report	Fleming 64'; Medley 83'	Stadium: Ninian Park; Attendance: 26,454

=== 1956 ===
14 May 1956 (Note: Belgrove F.C. Exhibition match.)	Ireland–Wales (Republic of Ireland)	3–3	England–Scotland	Dublin, Ireland
	J P Dunne; Allchurch 2		Thompson; Langton; Allen	Stadium: Dalymount Park; Referee: J Scully

=== 1969 ===
21 July 1969 (Note: Match to commemorate the investure of Prince Charles as Prince of Wales.)	Wales	0–1	Rest of the UK	Cardiff
		Report	Lee 34'	Stadium: Ninian Park; Attendance: 13,605; Referee: B. M. Griffiths

=== 2006 ===
21 May 2006 (Note: This is the only match played by any of the Home Nations against any of the Autonomous Communities of Spain.)	Basque Country	0–1	Wales	Bilbao
20:30 CET		Report	Giggs 76'	Stadium: San Mamés; Referee: Eduardo Iturralde González

== See also ==
- Category:Wales wartime international footballers
- Association football during World War I
- Association football during World War II
- 1945–46 British Victory Home Championship
