= William McNamee =

Scottish footballer

Personal information
- Date of birth: 1891
- Place of birth: Hamilton, Scotland
- Date of death: 10 June 1935 (aged 43–44)
- Place of death: Hamilton, Scotland
- Height: 5 ft 9 in (1.75 m)
- Position: Centre half

Youth career
- Hamilton St Mary's

Senior career*
Years	Team	Apps	(Gls)
–	Strathclyde		
1912–1920	Hamilton Academical	215	(16)
1920–1921	Airdrieonians	17	(0)

International career
1919	Scotland (wartime)	1	(0)
- * Club domestic league appearances and goals

William McNamee (1891 – 10 June 1935) was a Scottish footballer who played as a centre half, primarily for Hamilton Academical.

McNamee was selected to play for Scotland in an unofficial 'Victory International' in 1919, but by the end of the following year he had fallen out of favour at hometown club Accies, where he had spent eight seasons, and moved on to Airdrieonians for a short spell.
