= Malcolm McPhail =

Scottish footballer

Personal information
- Date of birth: 1895
- Place of birth: Barrhead, Scotland
- Date of death: 1975 (aged 79–80)
- Place of death: Paisley, Scotland
- Position: Outside left

Senior career*
Years	Team	Apps	(Gls)
1915	Arthurlie	8	(5)
1915–1924	Kilmarnock	245	(55)
1924–1926	Morton	36	(3)
Total		289	(63)

International career
1917	Scottish League (wartime)	1	(3)
1919	Scotland (wartime)	1	(0)
- * Club domestic league appearances and goals

Malcolm McPhail (1895 – 1975) was a Scottish footballer who played as an outside left, primarily for Kilmarnock, with whom he won the Scottish Cup in 1920. He was selected to play for Scotland in an unofficial 'Victory International' in 1919.

McPhail later served as a director of St Mirren. He was the older brother of Rangers and Scotland forward Bob McPhail.
