= Patrick Allan =

Scottish footballer

Personal information
- Date of birth: 20 September 1892
- Place of birth: Killearn, Scotland
- Date of death: 15 July 1955 (aged 62)
- Place of death: Dundee, Scotland
- Position: Forward

Senior career*
| Years | Team | Apps | (Gls) |
| 1911–1922 | Clyde | 87 | (34) |
| 1922–1923 | Hibernian | 7 | (0) |
| 1923 | → Dumbarton Harp (loan) | | |
| 1923–1924 | Vale of Leven | 3 | (0) |

International career
| 1916 | Scotland (wartime) | 1 | (0) |
- * Club domestic league appearances and goals

Patrick Allan (20 September 1892 – 15 July 1955) was a Scottish footballer who played as a forward, primarily for Clyde. Having joined the club in late 1911 from a team in Perth (details are not well documented) he was quickly involved in the run to the 1912 Scottish Cup Final but did not take part in Clyde's defeat to Celtic; however, he was in the side which claimed the Glasgow Cup in the 1914–15 season. In a career interrupted by World War I, Allan played for Scotland in one unofficial wartime international match.
