= Robert Orr (footballer) =

Scottish football player

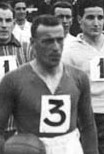
- Orr leading out Third Lanark during a tour match in Argentina, 1923

Personal information
- Full name: Robert McKissock Barnes Orr
- Date of birth: 26 January 1891
- Place of birth: Hardgate, Scotland
- Date of death: 2 June 1948 (aged 57)
- Place of death: Clydebank, Scotland
- Position: Left back

Senior career*
Years	Team	Apps	(Gls)
–	Clydebank Juniors		
1909–1924	Third Lanark	392	(31)
1924–1926	Morton	68	(6)
1926–1928	Crystal Palace	70	(2)
1928–1929	Dumbarton	30	(2)
1929–1930	Clydebank	22	(0)
Total		582	(41)

International career
1919–1922	Scottish League XI	2	(0)
1919	Scotland (wartime)	1	(0)
- * Club domestic league appearances and goals

Robert McKissock Barnes Orr (26 January 1891 – 2 June 1948) was a Scottish footballer who played as a left back.

== Professional career ==
His longest spell at club level was 15 years with Third Lanark (this was interrupted by World War I, although the Scottish Football League continued); the closest he came to winning a trophy in this time was reaching two finals of the Glasgow Merchants Charity Cup in 1910 (lost on a tally of corners following a draw) and 1914 (a 6–0 defeat to Celtic), and the final of the Glasgow Cup in 1923 (a loss to Rangers).

Later in his career he also turned out for Morton, Dumbarton and Clydebank, as well as for Crystal Palace in English football, for whom he made 70 league appearances, scoring twice.

Orr was selected to play for Scotland in an unofficial Victory International in 1919, played twice for the Scottish Football League XI and toured North America in 1921 and South America in 1923 with 'Scotland' (in reality, Third Lanark with a number of capable guest players).
