= Craig Brown (footballer, born 1893) =

Scottish footballer

Personal information
- Date of birth: 22 January 1893
- Place of birth: Muirkirk, Scotland
- Date of death: 23 November 1963 (aged 70)
- Place of death: East Kilbride, Scotland
- Height: 1.75 m (5 ft 9 in)
- Position: Centre half

Senior career*
Years	Team	Apps	(Gls)
–	Carluke Rovers		
–	Armadale		
1914–1919	Bradford City	9	(1)
1916–1917	→ Motherwell (loan)	33	(5)
1917	→ Hibernian (loan)	6	(0)
1919	→ Motherwell (loan)	15	(1)
1919–1924	Motherwell	148	(5)
1924–1926	Cowdenbeath	12	(0)
1926	Morton	2	(0)
–	Peebles Rovers		
–	Bathgate		
Total		225	(12)

International career
1922	Scottish League XI	1	(0)
- * Club domestic league appearances and goals

Craig Brown (22 January 1893 – 23 November 1963) was a Scottish footballer who played as a centre half for Armadale, Bradford City, Motherwell, Hibernian and the Scottish League XI. He also played for an unofficial 'Scotland' team in a tour of North America organised by Third Lanark in 1921.
