= 1945–46 British Victory Home Championship =

British Victory Home Championship
Tournament details
- Host country: England, Ireland, Scotland and Wales
- Dates: 15 September 1945 – 4 May 1946
- Teams: 4

Final positions
- Champions: Scotland
- Runners-up: England; Ireland; Wales

Tournament statistics
- Matches played: 6
- Goals scored: 11 (1.83 per match)
- Top scorer(s): (Ireland) Davy Walsh (Scotland) Billy Liddell (2 each)

The 1945–46 British Victory Home Championship was played during the 1945–46 football season between the national football teams of the four Home Nations of the British Isles. It was won by Scotland. Staged very soon after the end of World War II hostilities, the matches are not regarded as full internationals and are referred to as Victory Internationals.

== Table ==
Team	Pld	W	D	L	GF	GA	GD	Pts
Scotland (C)	3	3	0	0	6	2	+4	6
Ireland	3	1	0	2	3	4	−1	2
England	3	1	0	2	1	2	−1	2
Wales	3	1	0	2	1	3	−2	2

Rules for classification: 1) points. The points system worked as follows: 2 points for a win and 1 point for a draw.
(C) Champions

== Results ==
15 September 1945

Ireland	0–1	England
		Mortensen

Windsor Park, Belfast

20 October 1945

England	0–1	Wales
		Powell

The Hawthorns, West Bromwich

10 November 1945

Scotland	2–0	Wales
Waddell; Dodds

Hampden Park, Glasgow

2 February 1946

Ireland	2–3	Scotland
Walsh		Liddell; Hamilton

Windsor Park, Belfast

13 April 1946

Scotland	1–0	England
Delaney

Hampden Park, Glasgow

4 May 1946

Wales	0–1	Ireland
		Sloan

Ninian Park, Cardiff

== See also ==
- Association football during World War II
- England national football team results (unofficial matches)
- List of Scotland wartime international footballers
- Scotland national football team results (unofficial matches)
