= Peter Nellies =

Scottish footballer and manager

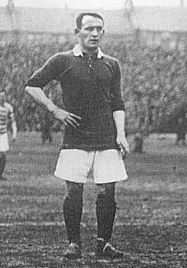
- Nellies playing for Hearts in 1912

Personal information
- Date of birth: 24 April 1886
- Place of birth: Kingseat, Scotland
- Date of death: 15 July 1930 (aged 44)
- Place of death: Glasgow, Scotland
- Height: 5 ft 7 in (1.70 m)
- Positions: Full back; wing half

Senior career*
Years	Team	Apps	(Gls)
–	Douglas Water Thistle		
1908–1921	Heart of Midlothian	339	(11)
1921–1922	King's Park	17	(0)
1922–1923	Berwick Rangers		
1923–1924	Carlisle United		

International career
1911–1919	Scottish League XI	9	(1)
1913–1914	Scotland	2	(0)
1915–1917	Scottish League (wartime)	4	(0)
1918	Scotland (wartime)	1	(0)

Managerial career
- 1922–1923: Berwick Rangers
- * Club domestic league appearances and goals

Peter Nellies (24 April 1886 – 15 July 1930) was a Scottish footballer, who played for Heart of Midlothian (where he played before, during and after World War I while also working in a reserved occupation as a coal miner during the conflict, and is ranked 8th on the club's all-time appearances list in the Scottish Football League), King's Park and Carlisle United.

He gained two caps for the Scotland national team (one as captain) and was selected nine times for the Scottish League XI, and was also manager of Berwick Rangers.

Nellies's sister married footballer Willie Cringan; the brothers-in-law played together once for the Scottish League XI in 1919.

== See also ==
- List of Scotland national football team captains
- List of Scotland wartime international footballers
