= William Stevenson (goalkeeper) =

Scottish footballer (born c.1906)

Personal information
- Date of birth: c. 1906
- Place of birth: Glasgow, Scotland
- Position: Goalkeeper

Senior career*
Years	Team	Apps	(Gls)
–	Strathclyde		
1926–1927	Arthurlie	51	(0)
1927	→ Beith (loan)		
1927–1928	Providence Clamdiggers	14	(0)
1928–1929	Third Lanark	35	(0)
1929–1938	Clyde	232	(0)
1938–1940	Dunfermline Athletic	33	(0)
Total		364	(0)
- * Club domestic league appearances and goals

William Stevenson (born c. 1906; date of death unknown) was a Scottish footballer who played as a goalkeeper.

He began his senior career at Arthurlie, being loaned to Beith within Scotland then allowed to pursue an opportunity in the United States, where he spent a season with Providence Clamdiggers – they finished in mid-table in both parts of the 1927–28 American Soccer League season. He then returned across the Atlantic Ocean, spending one year with Third Lanark before settling at Clyde, where he was the regular goalkeeper from 1929 until 1936 when he was displaced by Jock Brown. The closest Stevenson came to a trophy during his time at Shawfield was a defeat to Rangers in the 1933 Glasgow Cup final, coming six months after losing the semi-final of the 1932–33 Scottish Cup to Motherwell. In 1938 he transferred to lower division Dunfermline Athletic, spending one standard season in Fife and one more under unofficial conditions after the outbreak of World War II before retiring.

At representative level, Stevenson was selected once for the Glasgow FA's annual challenge match against Sheffield in 1932, and was a member of the Scottish Football Association's tour of North America in the summer of 1935, playing in every match (he was the only goalkeeper in the party) and conceding only 10 goals in 13 fixtures as the tourists returned home with a 100% record – the SFA does not regard any of these matches as full internationals, although two are counted as such by the United States Soccer Federation. He had earlier represented his country at Junior level while with Strathclyde at the start of his career.
