= Bobby Morrison (footballer, born 1933) =

Scottish footballer

Personal information
- Full name: Robert Crossan Morrison
- Date of birth: 16 February 1933
- Place of birth: Chapelhall, Scotland
- Date of death: 1999 (aged 65–66)
- Place of death: Airdrie, Scotland
- Position: Inside forward

Youth career
- Chapelhall Hearts

Senior career*
Years	Team	Apps	(Gls)
–	Dalry Thistle		
1951–1957	Falkirk	57	(16)
1957–1958	Rangers	5	(6)
1958–1959	Nottingham Forest	1	(0)
1959–1961	Workington	53	(20)
1961–1962	Coleraine		
1962–1964	Stenhousemuir	57	(2)

International career
1955	Scotland B vs A trial	1	(0)
- * Club domestic league appearances and goals

Robert Crossan Morrison (16 February 1933 – 1999) was a Scottish footballer who played mainly as an inside right.

== Career ==
Morrison began his senior career with Falkirk, impressing sufficiently in a 'trial' match between the club and a Scotland XI in late 1954 to be selected for the 'Scotland B' team against the same opponents a few months later alongside several Bairns colleagues, although this did not lead on to a full international cap.

In January 1957, he transferred to defending Scottish champions Rangers in a swap deal with Derek Grierson, and made a strong start at Ibrox with a goal on his debut in an Old Firm Scottish Cup tie (a 4–4 draw; Celtic won the replay), then scored six times in five league matches as the Gers clinched the 1956–57 Scottish Division One title – despite his input, it is unclear if Morrison received a winner's medal due to the low number of matches he played. At the end of the season he was in the side that won the Glasgow Merchants Charity Cup, scoring in the final. However, he only featured in one League Cup tie in the following campaign.

In the summer of 1958, he was released on a free transfer by Rangers and joined Nottingham Forest, but was also unable to break into the first team at the City Ground and appeared in only one Football League match in his single season with Forest (during which they won the FA Cup), then moved on to Workington where he began to play regularly again, albeit in the fourth tier of English football. In 1961 he switched to Coleraine of Northern Ireland for a year before returning to Scotland with part-timers Stenhousemuir.
