= Duncan McClure =

Scottish footballer (1913–1991)

Personal information
- Full name: Duncan Fraser McClure
- Date of birth: 10 June 1913
- Place of birth: Troon, Scotland
- Date of death: May 1991 (aged 77–78)
- Place of death: Grangemouth, Scotland
- Height: 5 ft 9 in (1.75 m)
- Position: Left back

Senior career*
Years	Team	Apps	(Gls)
–	Parkhead		
1933–1948	Heart of Midlothian	179	(1)

International career
1940	Scotland (wartime)	1	(0)
- * Club domestic league appearances and goals

Duncan Fraser McClure (10 June 1913 – May 1991) was a Scottish footballer who played as a left back, with Heart of Midlothian being his only club at professional level; taking all cups and unofficial wartime competitions into account, he made over 400 appearances for the Edinburgh club. He was selected to play for Scotland in an unofficial wartime international fixture in 1940.

After retiring as a player, McClure continued to work for Hearts for eight more years as a coach and scout, with Alex Young being one of his 'spots' in 1954.
