= John Hunter (Falkirk footballer) =

Scottish footballer

Personal information
- Date of birth: 1904
- Place of birth: Stenhousemuir, Scotland
- Position: Inside left

Senior career*
Years	Team	Apps	(Gls)
–	Burnhead United		
1920–1928	Falkirk	199	(41)
1922	→ Armadale (loan)		
1928–1931	Reading	86	(7)
1931–1932	Brideville		
1932–1938	Guildford City		
- * Club domestic league appearances and goals

John Hunter (born 1904) was a Scottish footballer who played as an inside left. He featured primarily for Falkirk where he spent seven seasons as a regular during a period when the team usually finished in a high position in the top division of the Scottish Football League. In 1927 he was selected as a member of a Scottish Football Association party which toured North America, but never received a full cap for Scotland.

In 1928 Hunter moved on to English football for three seasons with Reading, then had a spell in the League of Ireland with Brideville before returning to the south-east of England with Guildford City, where he was on the coaching staff as they won the Southern Football League title in 1937–38 while also still appearing for their reserve team.
