= Victory International =

Series of football matches

The term Victory International or Victory Internationals refers to two series of international football matches played by the national football teams of England, Scotland, Ireland and Wales at the end of both the First and Second World Wars. The matches were organised to celebrate the Victory of the Allied Powers in both wars. The term specifically refers to those matches played after the conflicts were over, making them distinct from the wartime internationals which were played during the course of the wars.

Among the games regarded as Victory Internationals were those played as part of the 1945–46 British Victory Home Championship. The 1945–46 season also saw England play Victory internationals against France, Switzerland and Belgium. Scotland also played the latter two national teams. The status of these internationals is open to debate. England, Ireland and Wales do not recognize any of these games as full internationals. Scotland, however, does list the games against Belgium and Switzerland as full internationals. Similarly, Belgium, Switzerland and France all regard their Victory Internationals as full internationals.

== World War I matches (1919) ==
22 March 1919

Scotland	2–1	Ireland
Andrew Wilson 2'		Billy Halligan

Ibrox Park

19 April 1919

Ireland	0–0	Scotland

Windsor Park, Belfast

26 April 1919

England	2–2	Scotland
Robert Turnbull; Sydney Puddefoot		John Stewart Wright; James Bowie

Goodison Park

3 May 1919

Scotland	3–4	England
Andrew Wilson 2 Alan Morton		Arthur Grimsdell 2'; Sydney Puddefoot 2'

Hampden Park

11 October 1919

Wales	2–1	England
Billy Meredith; George Wynn		Sydney Puddefoot

Ninian Park, Cardiff

19 October 1919

England	2–0	Wales
Bob Whittingham; Joe Smith

Victoria Ground

== World War II matches (1945–46) ==
15 September 1945

Ireland	0–1	England
		Stan Mortensen

Windsor Park, Belfast

20 October 1945

England	0–1	Wales
		Aubrey Powell

The Hawthorns, West Bromwich

10 November 1945

Scotland	2–0	Wales
William Waddell; Jock Dodds

Hampden Park, Glasgow

19 January 1946

England	2–0	Belgium
Robert Brown; Jesse Pye

Wembley Stadium

23 January 1946

Scotland	2–2	Belgium
Jimmy Delaney 2'		Victor Lemberechts; Freddy Chaves

Hampden Park

2 February 1946

Ireland	2–3	Scotland
Davy Walsh 2'		Billy Liddell 2 George Hamilton

Windsor Park, Belfast

13 April 1946

Scotland	1–0	England
Jimmy Delaney

Hampden Park, Glasgow

4 May 1946

Wales	0–1	Ireland
		Paddy Sloan

Ninian Park, Cardiff

11 May 1946

England	4–1	Switzerland
Raich Carter 2 Robert Brown; Tommy Lawton		Hans-Peter Friedlander

Stamford Bridge

15 May 1946

Scotland	3–1	Switzerland
Billy Liddell 2 Jimmy Delaney		Georges Aeby

Hampden Park

19 May 1946

France	2–1	England
Jean Prouff; Ernest Vaast		Jimmy Hagan

Stade Olympique de Colombes

== See also ==
- England national football team results (unofficial matches)
- Scotland national football team results (unofficial matches)
- Wales wartime national football team results
- List of Scotland wartime international footballers
