= Jimmy Carabine =

Scottish footballer (1911–1987)

Personal information
- Full name: James Carabine
- Date of birth: 23 November 1911
- Place of birth: Blantyre, Scotland
- Date of death: 2 December 1987 (aged 76)
- Place of death: Rutherglen, Scotland
- Position: Right back

Youth career
- St Joseph's Boys Guild

Senior career*
Years	Team	Apps	(Gls)
- Larkhall Thistle
1931–1946	Third Lanark	238	(14)

International career
1938–1939	Scotland	3	(0)
1937–1939	Scottish League XI	5	(0)
1939–1943	Scotland (wartime)	10	(0)

Managerial career
- 1946–1950: Third Lanark
- * Club domestic league appearances and goals

James Carabine (23 November 1911 – 2 December 1987) was a Scottish footballer, who played as a right back.

== Life ==
Carabine was born in Blantyre, South Lanarkshire to John and Agnes (née Scullion). His paternal first cousin was the footballer Dan Kelly.

In the club game, Carabine was most closely associated with Third Lanark, serving as a player from 1931 to November 1946 and then taking over as manager, until May 1950.

As a player, he won the 1934–35 Scottish Division Two title a year after suffering relegation from the top tier, then featured on the losing side in the 1936 Scottish Cup Final. In the three major competitions he made 262 appearances and scored 19 goals for the club.

As an international, Carabine represented Scotland in three official matches, appearing against the Netherlands (21 May 1938), Ireland (8 October 1938) and England (15 April 1939). He also featured in two unofficial games against Eastern United States and the American Soccer League (in which he scored a hat-trick) in a 1939 tour, and ten wartime internationals (all but one against England, his last being an 8–0 defeat on 16 October 1943).

On resigning from his role as manager of Third Lanark in 1950, Carabine noted 'I've had enough'. In the months following his resignation he began writing sports columns for the Daily Express.

== See also ==
- List of Scotland national football team captains
- List of Scotland wartime international footballers
