= Jimmy Dykes (Scottish footballer) =

Scottish footballer

Personal information
- Full name: James Dykes
- Date of birth: 12 October 1916
- Place of birth: Law, South Lanarkshire, Scotland
- Date of death: 1974 (aged 57–58)
- Place of death: Tasmania, Australia
- Position: Centre half

Senior career*
Years	Team	Apps	(Gls)
1935–1946	Heart of Midlothian	99	(1)
- → Ayr United (guest)
- → Blackpool (guest)
- → Charlton Athletic (guest)
- → Chelsea (guest)
- → Glentoran (guest)
1946–1947	Dundela		
1947–1950	Portadown		
1950–1951	Newry Town		
1951	Ross County		

International career
1937–1939	Scottish Football League XI	3	(0)
1938	Scotland	2	(0)
1941–1942	Scotland (wartime)	4	(0)
- * Club domestic league appearances and goals

James Dykes (12 October 1916 – 1974) was a Scottish footballer who played as a centre half. Born in Law, South Lanarkshire, he played for Heart of Midlothian and appeared twice for the Scotland national football team in 1938, also taking part in a SFA tour of North America the following summer. His senior career was effectively curtailed by the Second World War, during which he played for Hearts and made guest appearances for a variety of clubs in England and Northern Ireland, also being selected for four unofficial wartime internationals. After ending his playing career in 1951, Dykes emigrated to Australia. His son Robbie became an Australian rules footballer.
