= Andy Black (footballer) =

Scottish footballer (1917–1989)

Personal information
- Full name: Andrew Black
- Date of birth: 23 September 1917
- Place of birth: Stirling, Scotland
- Date of death: 16 October 1989 (aged 72)
- Place of death: Bannockburn, Scotland
- Height: 5 ft 11 in (1.80 m)
- Position: Inside forward

Youth career
- West End Rangers

Senior career*
Years	Team	Apps	(Gls)
- Shawfield
1935–1939	Heart of Midlothian	136	(105)
1946–1950	Manchester City	139	(47)
1950–1953	Stockport County	94	(38)

International career
1937–1938	Scottish Football League XI	2	(3)
1937–1938	Scotland	3	(3)
1942–1945	Scotland (wartime)	6	(5)
- * Club domestic league appearances and goals

Andrew Black (23 September 1917 – 16 February 1989) was a Scottish footballer, who played as an inside forward. He was born in Stirling.

Black was a prolific scorer with Heart of Midlothian before World War II, scoring 29 goals in 34 games in the 1936–37 season, before finishing as top scorer in the Scottish League with 40 goals in 38 appearances in the following season. He was widely credited the following season as being the first player to score a hat-trick against Rangers at Ibrox; however this had been first achieved by Willie Wilson, also of Hearts, in October 1915.

Black played as a guest for Chester during the latter stages of the war but the club were unsuccessful in their attempts to sign him permanently.

Black transferred to Manchester City in 1946 and between then and 1950 appeared 139 times and scored 47 goals. In a match during the late 1940s at Maine Road, the Charlton Athletic goalkeeper Sam Bartram sliced a clearance from the edge of his penalty area. Black, stood just inside his own half, headed the ball back over Bartram. City's pitch was 115 yards long so the ball must have travelled nearly sixty yards. He finished his career with Stockport County in 1953.

Black won three caps for the Scotland national football team and six wartime caps, including one game where he had to be carried off of the pitch by Frank Swift after becoming injured.

He died on 16 February 1989 in Bannockburn Hospital.
