= James Scott (footballer, born 1895) =

Scottish footballer (1895–1916)

Personal information
- Date of birth: 1895
- Place of birth: Airdrie, Scotland
- Date of death: 1 July 1916 (aged 20–21)
- Place of death: near Ovillers-la-Boisselle, France
- Position: Forward

Youth career
- Craigton Thistle

Senior career*
Years	Team	Apps	(Gls)
–1913	Petershill		
1913–1915	Raith Rovers	59	(23)

International career
1916	Scotland (wartime)	1	(1)
- * Club domestic league appearances and goals

James Scott (1895 – 1 July 1916) was a Scottish professional footballer who played as a forward in the Scottish League for Raith Rovers. He scored on his only appearance for Scotland in a wartime international in 1916, during the First World War. He was described as "an all-round forward" and "the most consistent goalscorer Raith have ever had".

== Personal life ==
Scott was born in Airdrie to James Scott and Annabella Bennett. He attended Airdrie Academy and later became an apprentice wire rope maker with the Caledonian Wire Rope Company. On 4 April 1915, Scott married Catherine Reekie and they had one child, James. Scott served as a private in McCrae's Battalion of the Royal Scots during the First World War. On the first day of the Somme, he was hit in the stomach and neck by machine gun fire and killed during an attack on Ovillers-la-Boisselle. Scott is commemorated on the Thiepval Memorial.

== Career statistics ==
Appearances and goals by club, season and competition
Club	Season	League			Scottish Cup		Total	
Club	Season	Division	Apps	Goals	Apps	Goals	Apps	Goals
Raith Rovers	1913–14	Scottish First Division	28	12	2	0	30	12
Raith Rovers	1914–15	Scottish First Division	31	11	0	0	31	11
Career total			59	23	2	0	61	23

== Honours ==
- Raith Rovers Hall of Fame
