= Tommy Brown (footballer, born 1921) =

Scottish footballer (1921–1966)

Personal information
- Full name: Thomas Law Brown
- Date of birth: 17 April 1921
- Place of birth: Glenbuck, Scotland
- Date of death: 10 May 1966 (aged 45)
- Place of death: Edinburgh, Scotland
- Position: Wing half

Senior career*
Years	Team	Apps	(Gls)
1936–1938	Cambuslang Rangers		
1938–1942	Heart of Midlothian	29	(1)
1945–1948	Millwall	69	(7)
1948–1950	Charlton Athletic	34	(1)
1950–1953	Leyton Orient	98	(5)
–	Dartford		

International career
1939	Scottish League XI	1	(0)
1939–1941	Scotland (wartime)	3	(0)
- * Club domestic league appearances and goals

Thomas Law Brown (17 April 1921 – 10 May 1966) was a Scottish footballer who played for clubs including Heart of Midlothian, Millwall, Charlton Athletic and Leyton Orient, as a wing half. In a career interrupted by World War II, he had been selected for the Scottish League XI within his first season as a professional at Hearts aged 17, and played for Scotland in three unofficial wartime international matches, two of them while still a teenager. After the war, he moved to English football, playing only for clubs in London.

Brown was born in the small Ayrshire mining community of Glenbuck which produced several professional footballers, among them a pair of brothers with the same surname and even including another Tommy Brown; however, it is believed he was not directly related to them.
