= The Hawthorns =

Football stadium in West Bromwich, Sandwell, England

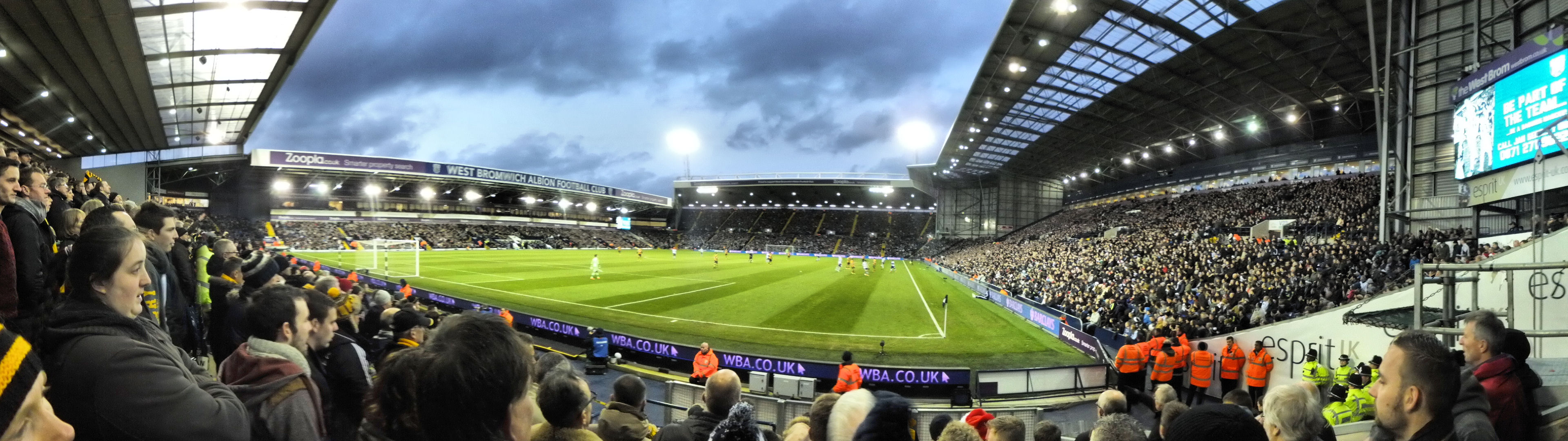
- The Hawthorns, December 2013
- Interactive map of The Hawthorns
- Full name: The Hawthorns
- Location: Halfords Lane; West Bromwich; B71 4LF
- Coordinates: 52°30′33″N 1°57′50″W
- Elevation: 551 feet (168 m)
- Owner: West Bromwich Albion F.C.
- Operator: West Bromwich Albion F.C.
- Capacity: 27,087
- Surface: Desso GrassMaster
- Record attendance: 64,815 v Arsenal, 1937 (FA Cup Sixth Round)
- Field size: 105 by 68 metres (114.8 yd × 74.4 yd)
- Public transit: The Hawthorns; 61, 74 and 89 bus routes

Construction
- Groundbreaking: May 1900
- Built: May – September 1900
- Opened: 3 September 1900
- Renovated: East Stand, 2001 Birmingham Road End & Smethwick End, 1994 West Stand, 1982

Tenant
- West Bromwich Albion (1900–present)

The Hawthorns is an all-seater football stadium in West Bromwich, in the Black Country borough of Sandwell, West Midlands, England, with a capacity of 27,087. It has been the home of Championship club West Bromwich Albion since 1900, when it became the sixth ground to be used by the club. The Hawthorns was the first Football League ground to be built in the 20th century, opening in September 1900 after construction work took only 4 months. The official record attendance at The Hawthorns stands at 64,815, set in March 1937.

Alongside being the home of West Bromwich Albion for over 125 years, The Hawthorns has also hosted a number of England internationals, as well as two FA Cup semi-finals. At an altitude of 551 feet (168 m), it is the highest ground above sea level of all Premier League and Football League clubs.

== Previous grounds ==
The Hawthorns (England)

During the early years of the club, West Bromwich Albion led something of a nomadic existence, playing at five different grounds in a 22-year period. Their first ground was Cooper's Hill, which the club occupied from 1878 to 1879. From 1879 to 1881 they played at Dartmouth Park, although they may also have alternated between there and Cooper's Hill during this period. Albion's third ground was Bunn's Field, also known as The Birches, where they played for a single season in 1881–82. With a capacity of 1500–2000, it was their first enclosed ground, allowing the club to charge an entrance fee for the first time. The increasing popularity of football led the well-established West Bromwich Dartmouth Cricket Club to rent their Four Acres ground to Albion from 1882 to 1885, but they quickly outgrew their new home and soon needed to move again. Albion's tenure of Stoney Lane, from 1885 to 1900, was arguably the most successful period in the club's history, as the club won the FA Cup twice and were runners-up three times.

== History ==
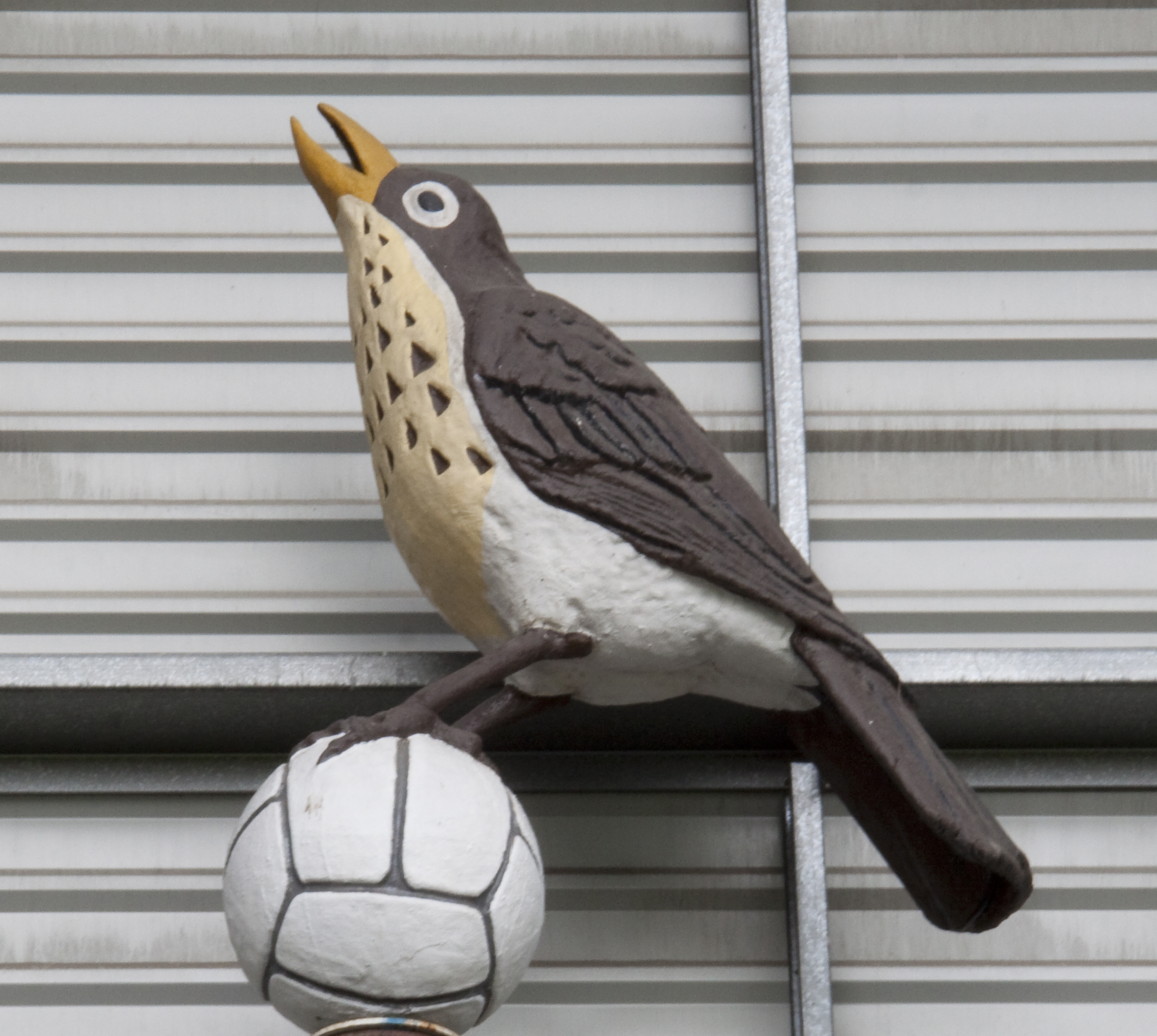
The throstle effigy has been a feature of the Woodman corner since the 1970s.

=== 20th century ===
The expiry of the lease on Stoney Lane, as well as the club's desire for a more spacious location, saw them move once again in 1900, this time permanently. All of Albion's previous grounds had been close to the centre of West Bromwich, but on this occasion they took up an "out of town" site on the borders of Handsworth and Smethwick. The area was covered in hawthorn bushes, which were cleared to make way for the new ground, hence its name, the Hawthorns. The club signed a lease for the land on 14 May 1900, giving them the option to buy within 14 years from the owner, Sandwell Park Colliery, and Albion did indeed buy the freehold on the ground in June 1913.

When opened, the Hawthorns could hold around 35,500 spectators. The first match took place on Monday 3 September 1900, when Albion drew 1–1 with Derby County in front of a crowd of 20,104. Derby's England international Steve Bloomer scored the first Hawthorns goal, with Chippy Simmons equalizing for Albion. The first Saturday game followed soon after, with Albion losing out 0–1 to fierce local rivals Aston Villa in front of a capacity crowd, officially put at 35,417 but with many more forcing entry and an estimated 15,000 people locked out. The 1900–01 campaign was not a successful one however, as Albion finished bottom of the table and were relegated to Division Two. Their defeat to Sheffield United on the final day of the season was witnessed by just 1,050 spectators, which remains the record lowest crowd for a league game at the Hawthorns.

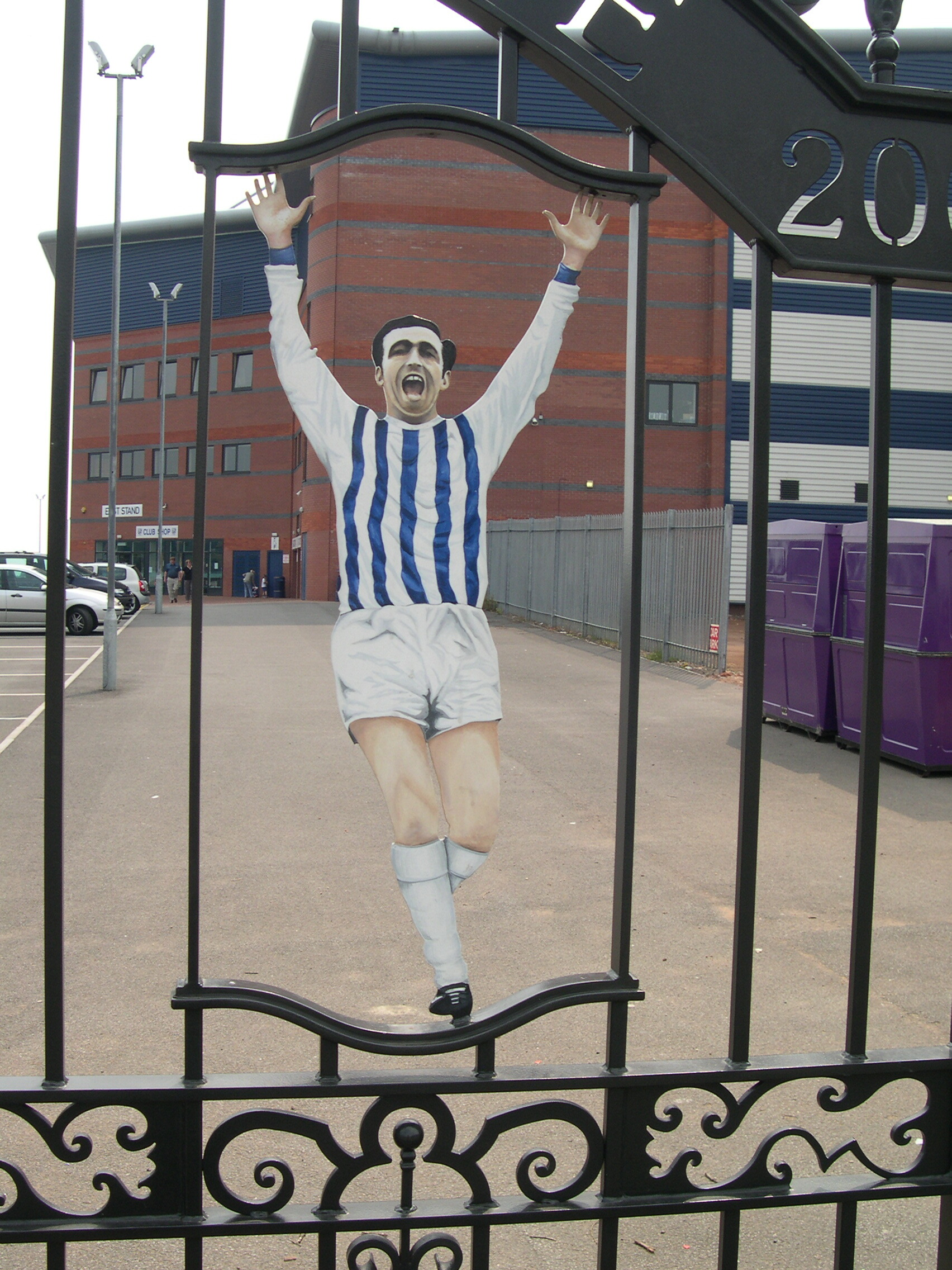
The Jeff Astle (1942–2002) gates were erected in 2003.

The ground was gradually expanded and 1923 saw the first ever 50,000+ gate with 56,474 watching a 2–1 win in the cup against Sunderland. The first 60,000+ gate followed in 1925, with 64,612 fans watching a cup tie with arch-rivals Aston Villa. The all-time attendance record at the Hawthorns was set on 6 March 1937, when 64,815 spectators crammed in to see Albion beat hot-favourites Arsenal 3–1 in the FA Cup quarter-final. This record was likely bettered when Albion played Newcastle United in an FA Cup fifth round tie in 1954, when over 80,000 people are believed to have been in attendance. However, the official crowd was registered as 61,088. The highest ever league crowd was for a 1–1 draw 60,945 against Wolves on 4 March 1950.

Concrete terracing was added to the ground in 1920. In 1949 the ground became the first in Britain to have an electronic turnstile aggregator fitted, in order to automatically calculate attendances. In 1957 electric floodlights were erected, at a cost of £18,000. The ground's first floodlit match saw Albion draw 1–1 with Chelsea, on 18 September 1957. Soon afterwards a friendly game against the Russian Red Army was organised to officially open them. Albion won 6–5 in front of 53,805 fans.

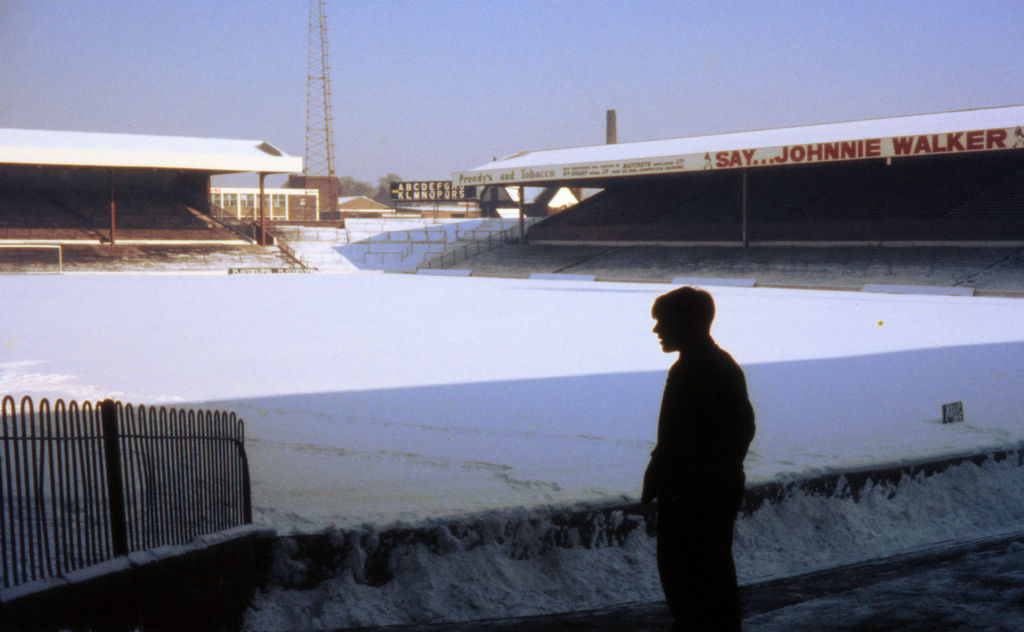
The Hawthorns after snow, in 1969. The Birmingham Road end is on the left.

The ground was once divided by the Birmingham/Smethwick border, but was moved completely into the latter by a minor rationalisation of local government borders in the 1960s and is now entirely in Sandwell. In 1964 the large Handsworth Side terrace was replaced by the Rainbow Stand at a cost of £40,000, reducing capacity to around 50,000. In October 1968, closed-circuit television was installed at the ground, in an attempt to ward off "increasing hooliganism". Over the following decades capacity was further reduced and perimeter fences were built to help tackle hooliganism. The Halfords Lane stand was rebuilt in two separate phases between 1979 and 1982, at a cost of around £2.5 million.

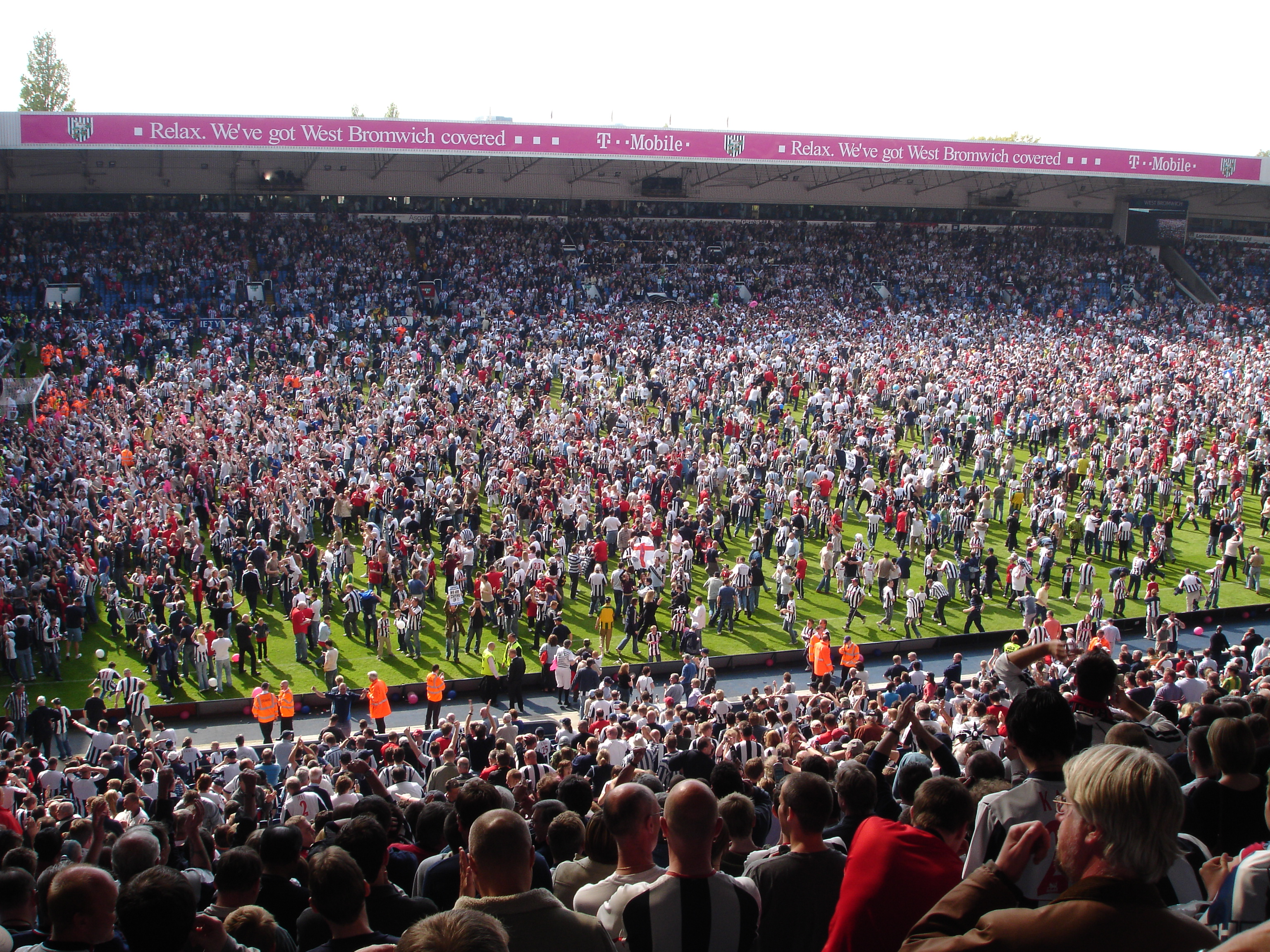
Fans spill onto the pitch following Albion's escape from relegation in 2005.

By the end of the 1980s, the capacity had been slashed dramatically to just over 30,000, with attendances frequently dropping below half that figure. The Hawthorns was become increasingly dilapidated and in need of modernisation. Following the Taylor Report in January 1990, the ground became all-seated with first the Smethwick End and then the much-loved Birmingham Road End terraces being demolished and replaced by all-seater stands, giving it a capacity of more than 25,000 by the mid-1990s. The official re-opening of the redeveloped ground saw Albion beat Bristol City 1–0 on Boxing Day in 1994.

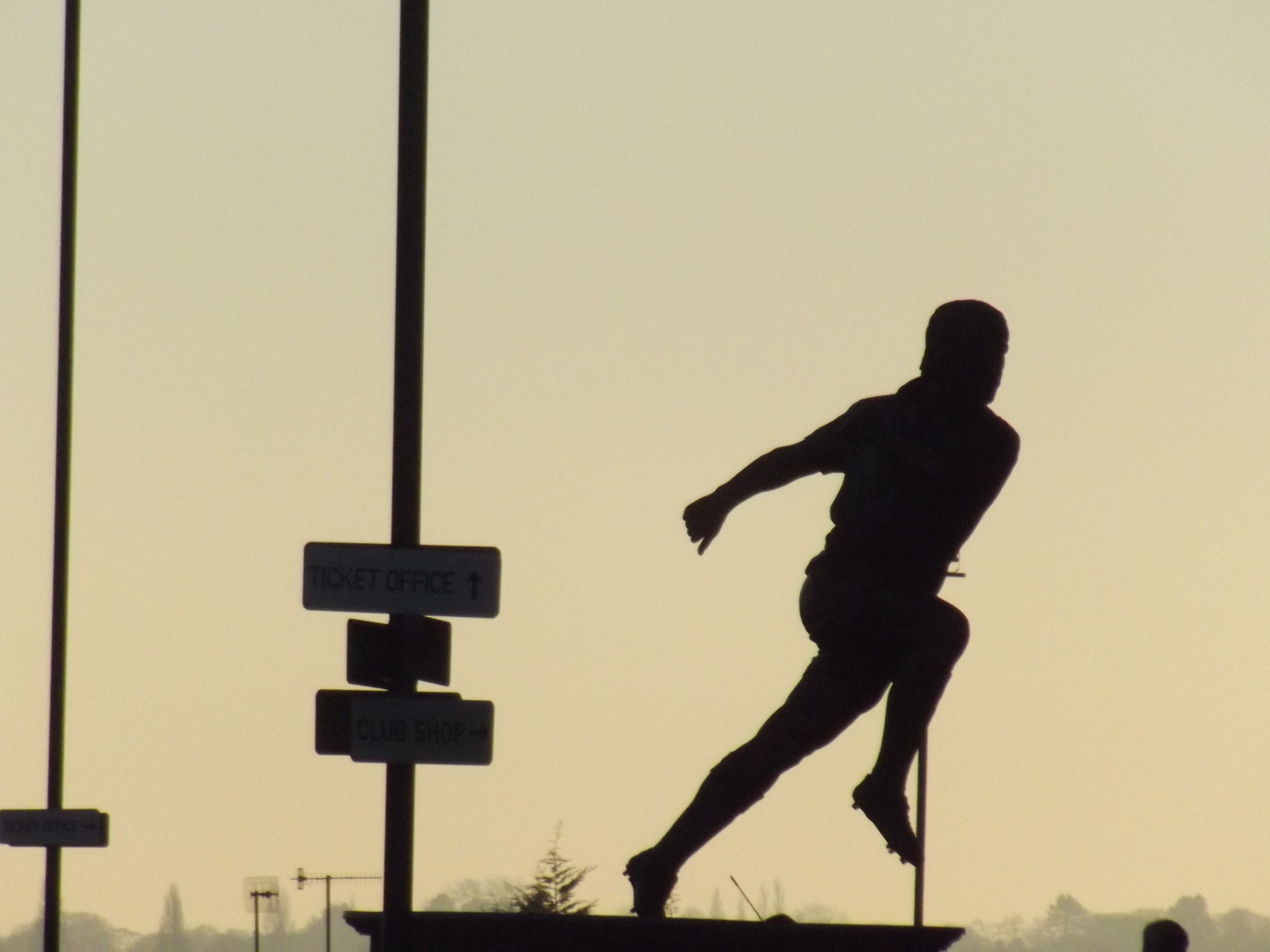
Sillouette of the Tony Brown statue outside The Hawthorns.

=== 21st century ===
Albion celebrated the stadium's centenary on 3 September 2000 by beating Crystal Palace 1–0 in a Division One match. In 2001 the Rainbow Stand was replaced by the new East Stand, raising the capacity to 28,003. In 2002, the Hawthorns became the first ground to install big screens in the widescreen format. The ground hosted its first Premier League match on 24 August 2002, with Albion losing 3–1 to Leeds United. Leeds player Harry Kewell scored the first Premier League goal on the ground. The Jeff Astle gates, which commemorate one of Albion's greatest strikers, were unveiled on 11 July 2003. The gates are located on the Birmingham Road, close to the Woodman Corner, and form the entrance to the East Stand car park. In December 2003, the board of directors unveiled plans to increase the stadium's capacity to 40,000 all-seated. However, these plans were scrapped as Albion slipped out of the Premiership in 2006.

There had been plans for the Halfords Lane Stand to be rebuilt, but these were shelved due to what Albion chairman Jeremy Peace called "continuing levels of excess capacity". The stand was instead refurbished and became known as the West Stand, with the capacity reduced to 26,272. Plans were again announced to expand capacity after West Bromwich finished in their highest league position since 1983. The plans involved an increase of capacity to around 30,000 by 2014, regardless of league performance. However, this never materialised and the Hawthorns still awaits its first major development in nearly two decades.

On 6 November 2014 a statue of Tony Brown, Albion's record appearance maker and goalscorer, was revealed. Safe standing was introduced to The Hawthorns ahead of the 2025–26 season. Around 4000 safe standing seats were added to the Smethwick End and Millennium Corner for the first phase of implementation.

In April 2017, The Hawthorns was listed by FourFourTwo magazine as the best stadium of all 92 in the Premier League and English Football League, citing it to be "modern and atmospheric". The article stated that The Hawthorns "Combines the best features of a Premier League football ground... but the stadium still retains its own identity. The atmosphere can be electric on a good day: when the "boing boing" chant gets going, the home fans are literally bouncing".

== Stands and features ==
=== West Stand ===
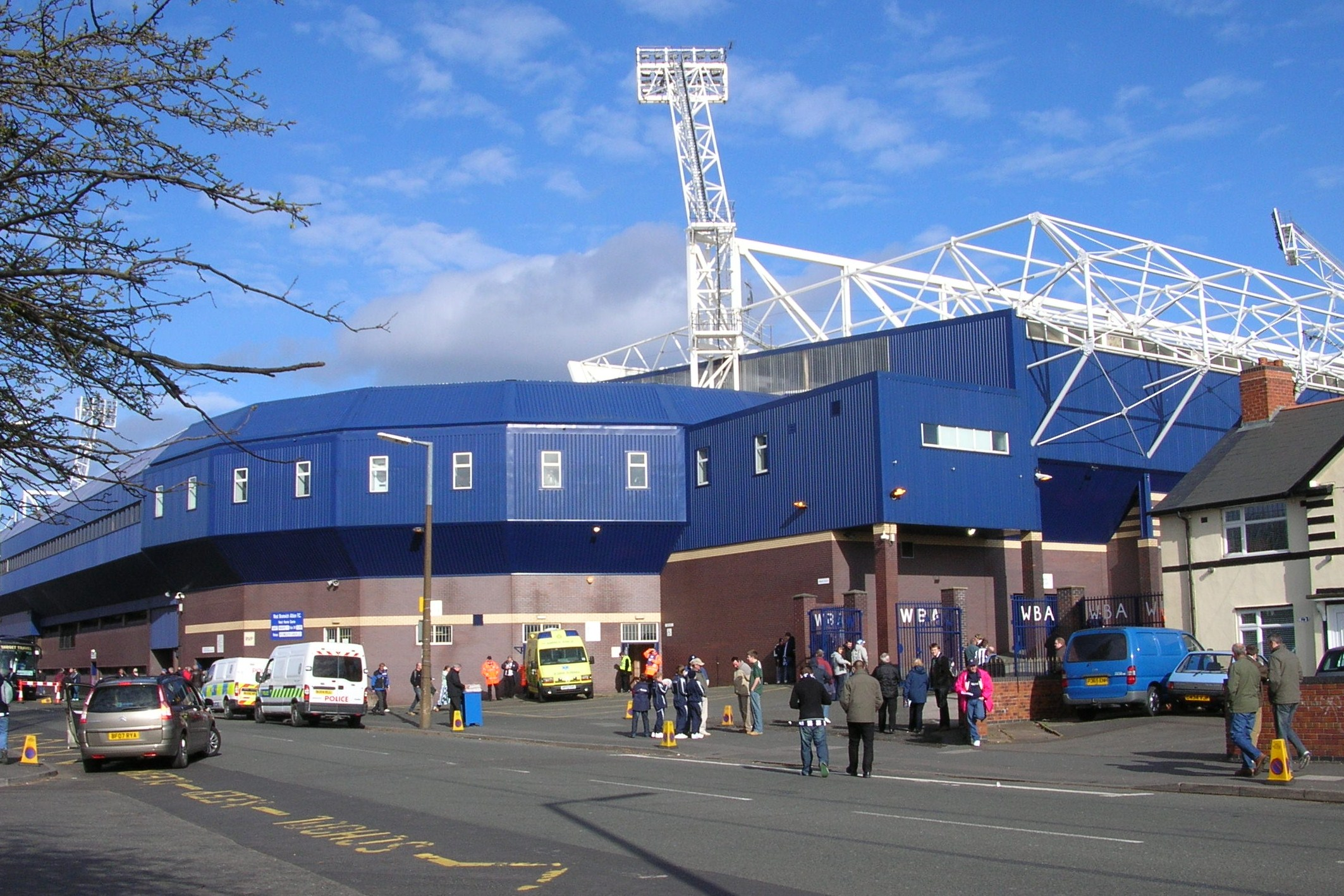
The West Stand and Smethwick End (exterior).

Constructed: 1979–1982
Refurbished: 2008
Capacity: 4,725 (seated)

Running along the west edge of the pitch and along Halford's Lane, the West Stand (formerly the Halford's Lane Stand) provided VIP seating before the advent of the new East Stand. The stand houses the main TV cameras as well as the press and commentary area. Chairman Jeremy Peace had announced plans for the Halfords Lane Stand to be demolished to make way for a single-tier, 10,000 seated stand, raising the total stadium capacity to around 32,000. However, following Albion's relegation from the Premier League, this plan has been shelved, despite Albion regaining their top flight status in 2008. The stand has instead been refurbished, cutting capacity from 28,003 to 26,272. The old name of the stand also provided the names for the names for the three aging detectives in New Tricks. Jack Halford (James Bolam) Brian Lane (Alun Armstrong) and Gerry Standing (Denis Waterman).

=== Birmingham Road End ===
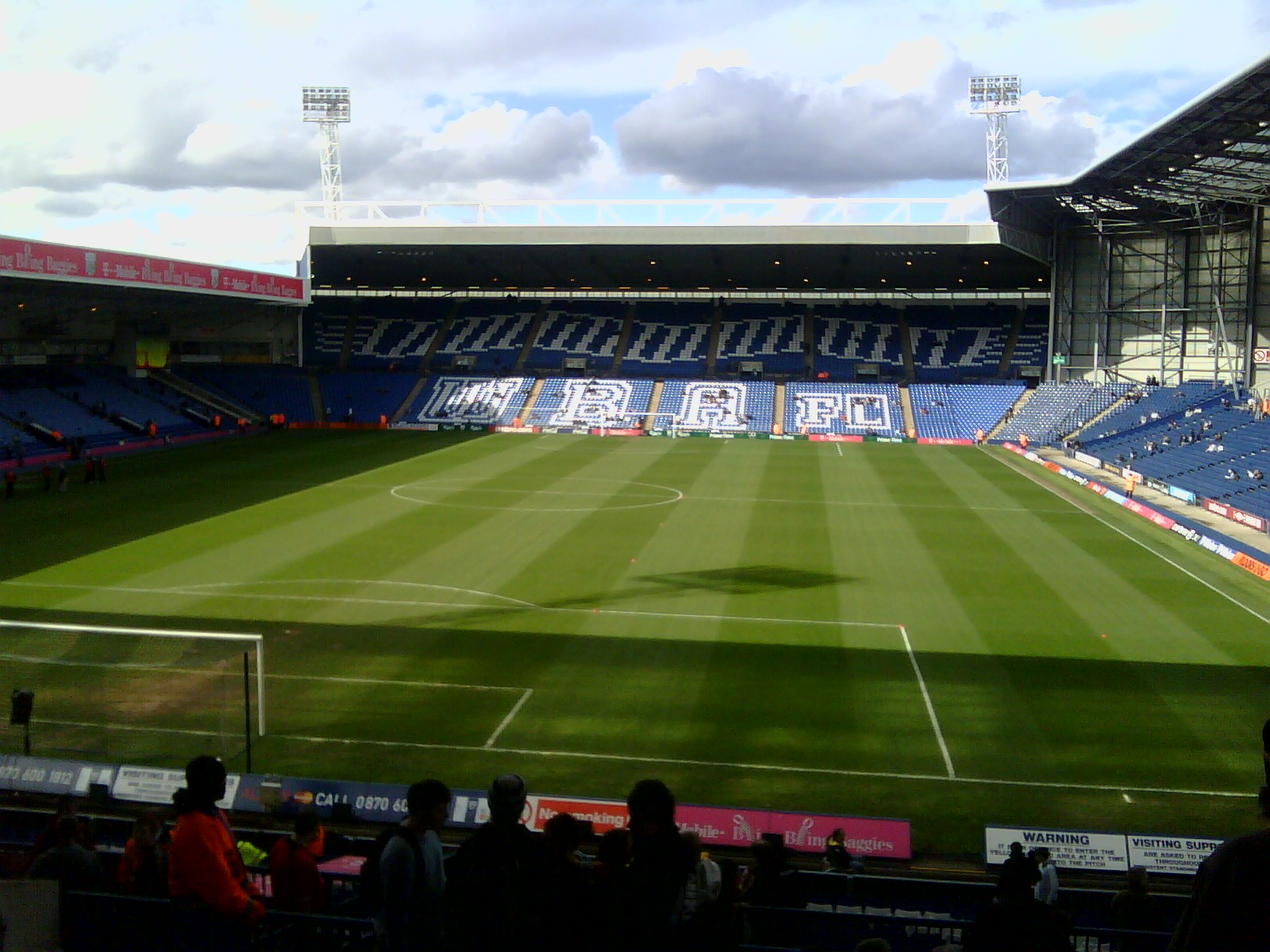
View of the Birmingham Road End from the Smethwick End.

Constructed: 1994
Capacity: 8,286 (seated) (including Woodman Corner)

Affectionately called the Brummie Road by supporters, the Birmingham Road End runs behind the goal, adjacent to the A41. Traditionally, it housed the core of the home support and was the main source of the so-called "Albion roar". When a terrace, it held up to 14,000, but the stand which replaced it in 1994 holds 8,000 all-seated spectators.

Between this stand and the East Stand lies the Woodman corner, named after the Woodman pub which stood just behind it until its demolition in 2004. The Woodman corner is home to a large throstle mascot, which was originally perched above the old (terraced) Woodman corner scoreboard. The throstle effigy first appeared in 1979 and has been a familiar sight in the stadium since.

=== Smethwick End ===
Constructed: 1994
Capacity: 5,200 (seated)

Running behind the goal at the southern edge of the pitch, the Smethwick End houses away supporters, though they are only allocated part of the stand, except for cup matches. The remainder houses the most vocal of Albion's home support. Development in the summer of 2014 increased the stadium capacity to 26,850, with added seats made available in the Smethwick End due to the movement of the police control room. Safe standing areas are based in the Smethwick End's upper tier.

=== East Stand ===
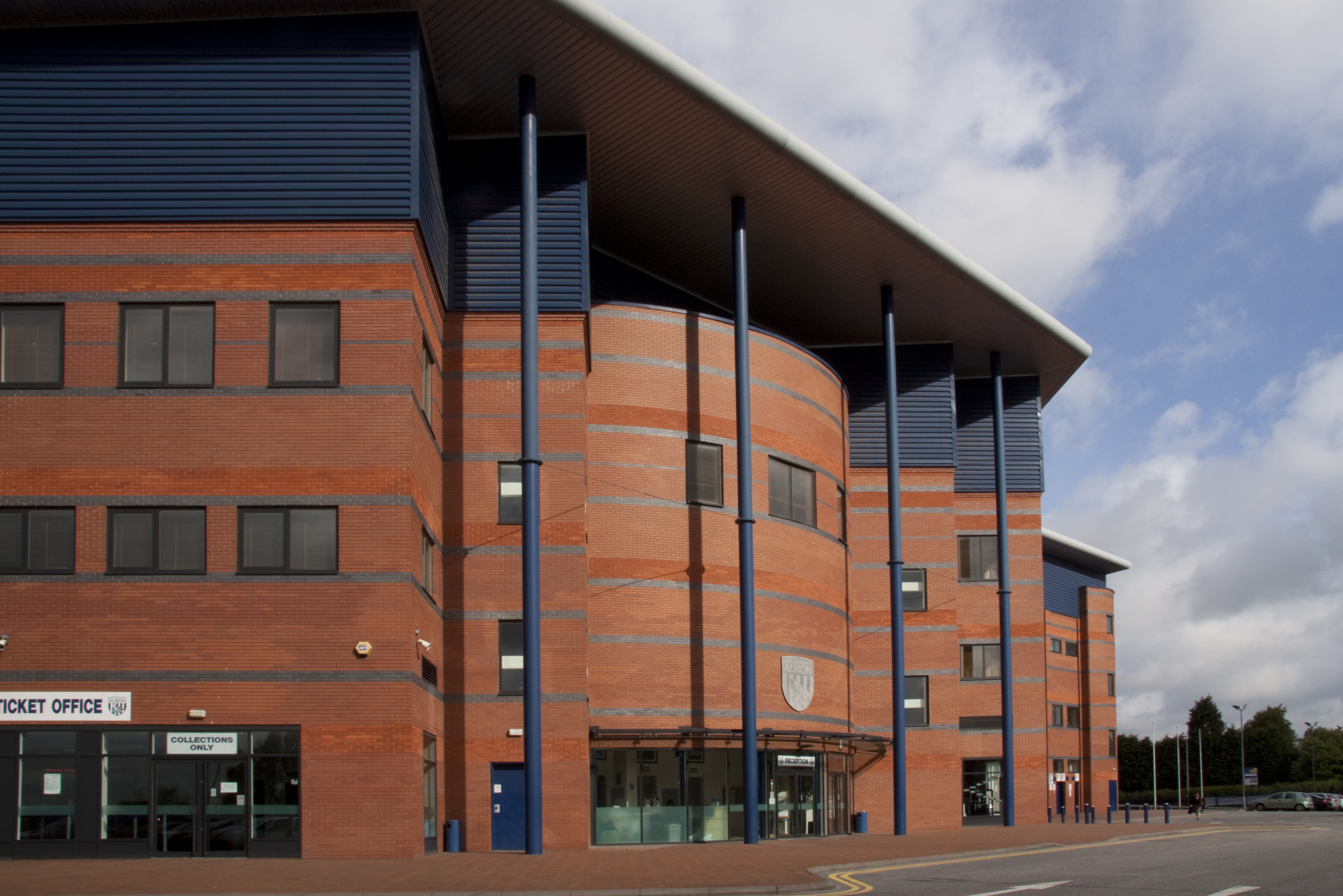
The East Stand, including the club's main reception and ticket office.

Constructed: 2001
Capacity: 8,791 (seated)

Replacing the old Rainbow Stand, the East Stand now houses the club's administration offices, club shop, club ticket office and corporate entertainment suites. The wings of the East Stand are known as the Woodman corner (which joins up with the Birmingham Road End, and is named after the Woodman public house that stood there until 2004) and the Millennium Corner (adjacent to the Smethwick End).

The Rainbow Stand was built in 1964, originally known as the East Stand, but gained the name Rainbow Stand over the next few years owing to its brightly painted seats. It originally consisted of standing accommodation in the lower section and seating in the upper section. However, a refurbishment project in 1977 saw the terracing replaced by executive boxes and seating. It survived until 2000, when it was demolished to make way for the new stand which opened in the 2000–01 season.

=== Tony 'Bomber' Brown statue ===
A statue dedicated to Albion's record appearance maker and goalscorer, Tony Brown, is situated outside the stadium's East Stand. The statue depicts Brown scoring his second goal in Albion's 2–0 victory over Valencia in the last-16 tie of the 1978–79 UEFA Cup. The statue's plaque acknowledges his appearance and goalscoring figures, as well as major honours won whilst at the club.

It also contains a quote from Brown:

The moment I walked into The Hawthorns I felt I was home.

=== Jeff Astle gates ===
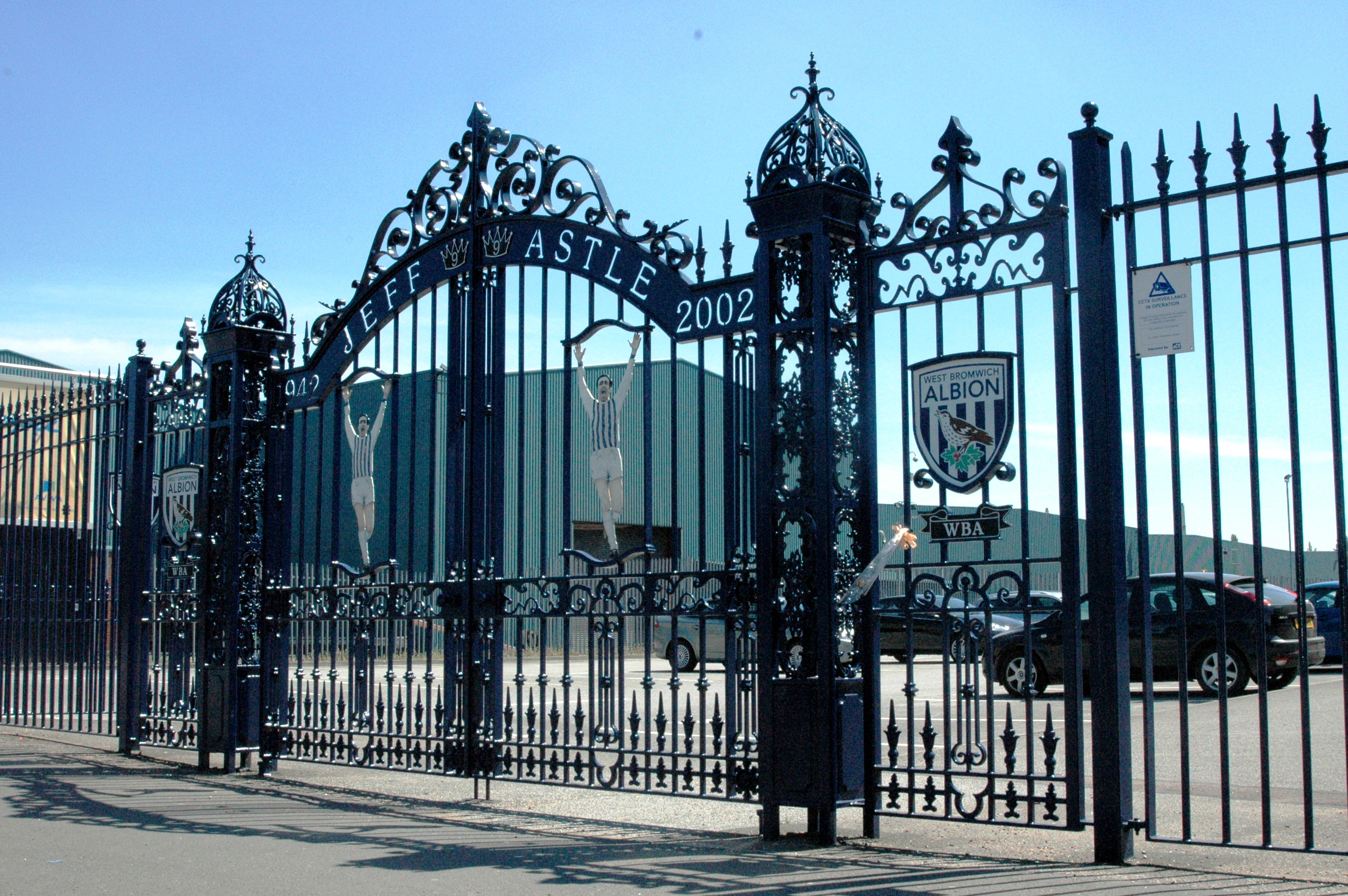
The Jeff Astle gates.

The Jeff Astle gates were built in honour of one of the club's most beloved players. They are located on the Birmingham Road, close to the Woodman Corner. The gates feature Astle's celebratory pose after his winning goal in the 1968 FA Cup Final. The gates have also become an unofficial location for tributes and makeshift memorials, most notably following the death of another of Albion's great strikers, Cyrille Regis.

=== Memorial Garden ===
A small memorial garden is located in the corner of the East Stand car park, adjacent to the meeting of the East Stand and Smethwick End.

=== Baggies Brick Road ===
The pavement running along the front of the East Stand is made up of individual bricks containing the names of supporters.

=== Fan Zone ===
The club operates a Fan Zone near the Hawthorns Pub building, a Grade II listed building behind the West Stand on the corner of Halfords Lane and the Birmingham Road. This area has served as the official club fanzone with licensed bars, food vendors, live music and fan favourites – such as mascots, former player interviews and children activities. The club owns the Hawthorns Pub building, which is currently run by a high street food outlet.

== Other uses ==
=== Football ===
As well as serving as the home ground of West Bromwich Albion, the Hawthorns has hosted a number of other football matches. It has hosted three full England internationals: on 21 October 1922, England beat Ireland 2–0, while on 8 December 1924 they won 4–0 against Belgium. The ground also hosted the first post-war match between England and Wales on 20 October 1945, in which England lost 0–1 to Wales in front of 54,611 people. The Hawthorns hosted a 'B' international for the first time in February 1998, when England B lost 2–1 to Chile. Two months later, a women's international friendly was hosted, Italy winning 2–1 against England.

==== Full England international matches ====
Date		Result		Competition
21 October 1922	England	2–0	Ireland	British Home Championship
8 December 1924	England	4–0	Belgium	International Friendly
20 October 1945	England	0–1	Wales	British Home Championship

Two FA cup semi-finals have been staged at the ground. The first saw Derby County draw 1–1 to Sheffield United in 1902, and the second took place between Aston Villa and Wolverhampton Wanderers in 1960. Wolves won 1–0 in front of 55,596. The Hawthorns also staged the FA Trophy final replays of 1987 and 1988.

On 11 January 1987, Telford United (a non-league side playing some 30 miles away in Shropshire), switched their FA Cup tie against Leeds United to the Hawthorns as they had refused to host it at their own stadium due to concerns over hooliganism.

On 24 March 2025, The Hawthorns hosted an England U21 international friendly victory versues Portugal U21 in front of a crowd of around 15,000.

=== Other sports ===
The ground has additionally been the venue for other sporting events. In its early years, the ground was used for athletics meetings; in May 1908, Birchfield Harriers used the Hawthorns for their Spring Meeting, which included the end of the first marathon to be run in the Midlands. The runners covered 25 miles (40 km) from Coventry to the Hawthorns, and one of them – Jack Price of Small Heath Harriers – was selected for the British team for the London Olympic Games on the strength of his performance.

In the late 1970s the Hawthorns was the venue for a cricket match between India and Pakistan, watched by 2,641 spectators, while in 2000 and 2001 the ground hosted Kabaddi tournaments. During the mid-late 1990s there were proposals for Moseley Rugby Football Club to share the ground, but these never materialised.

== Records and statistics ==
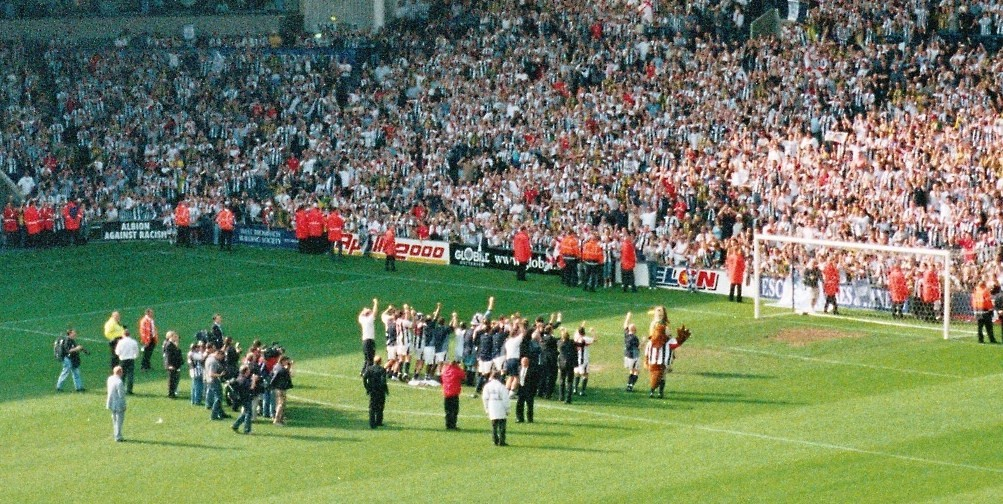
WBA fans and players celebrating in 2004

=== Records ===
- All-time Record Attendance: 64,815 v Arsenal, 6 March 1937 (FA Cup Sixth Round)
- Modern All-Seated Record Attendance: 27,751 v Portsmouth, 15 May 2005 (Premier League)
- All-time Record Average Attendance: 40,083 (First Division, 1953–54)
- Modern All-Seated Record Average Attendance: 26,776 (Premier League, 2002–03)

=== Average attendances in the 21st century ===
- 2001–02: 23,655 (Football League Division One)
- 2002–03: 26,776 (Premier League)
- 2003–04: 24,765 (Football League Division One)
- 2004–05: 25,987 (Premier League)
- 2005–06: 25,404 (Premier League)
- 2006–07: 20,472 (Football League Championship)
- 2007–08: 22,314 (Football League Championship)
- 2008–09: 25,828 (Premier League)
- 2009–10: 22,199 (Football League Championship)
- 2010–11: 24,683 (Premier League)
- 2011–12: 24,798 (Premier League)
- 2012–13: 25,360 (Premier League)
- 2013–14: 25,194 (Premier League)
- 2014–15: 25,064 (Premier League)
- 2015–16: 24,631 (Premier League)
- 2016–17: 23,876 (Premier League)
- 2017–18: 24,520 (Premier League)
- 2018–19: 24,148 (Football League Championship)
- 2019–20: 24,153 (Football League Championship) (Note: Due to the Covid-19 pandemic, the home games versus Birmingham City, Hull City, Derby County, Fulham & Queens Park Rangers were played behind closed doors. Average calculated for the 18 matches for which attendance was permitted.)
- 2020–21: 5,371 (Premier League) (Note: Due to the Covid-19 pandemic, all home games were played behind closed doors, with the exception of the final home game versus West Ham United, where capacity was limited to around 5,400. Average calculated for the 1 match for which attendance was permitted.)
- 2021–22: 21,875 (Football League Championship)
- 2022–23: 23,111 (Football League Championship)
- 2023–24: 24,112 (Football League Championship)
- 2024–25: 25,057 (Football League Championship)

=== Progressive record attendances ===
- 3 September 1901: 20,104 v Derby County
- 8 September 1901: 35,417 v Aston Villa
- 23 February 1907: 35,629 v Derby County
- 11 January 1908: 36,727 v Birmingham
- 26 December 1908: 38,049 v Birmingham
- 30 September 1911: 46,203 v Aston Villa
- 4 October 1913: 48,057 v Aston Villa
- 10 February 1919: 49,121 v Aston Villa
- 26 December 1921: 49,488 v Birmingham
- 3 February 1923: 56,474 v Sunderland
- 21 February 1925: 64,612 v Aston Villa
- 6 March 1937: 64,815 v Arsenal

== Transport ==
=== Train / Tram ===
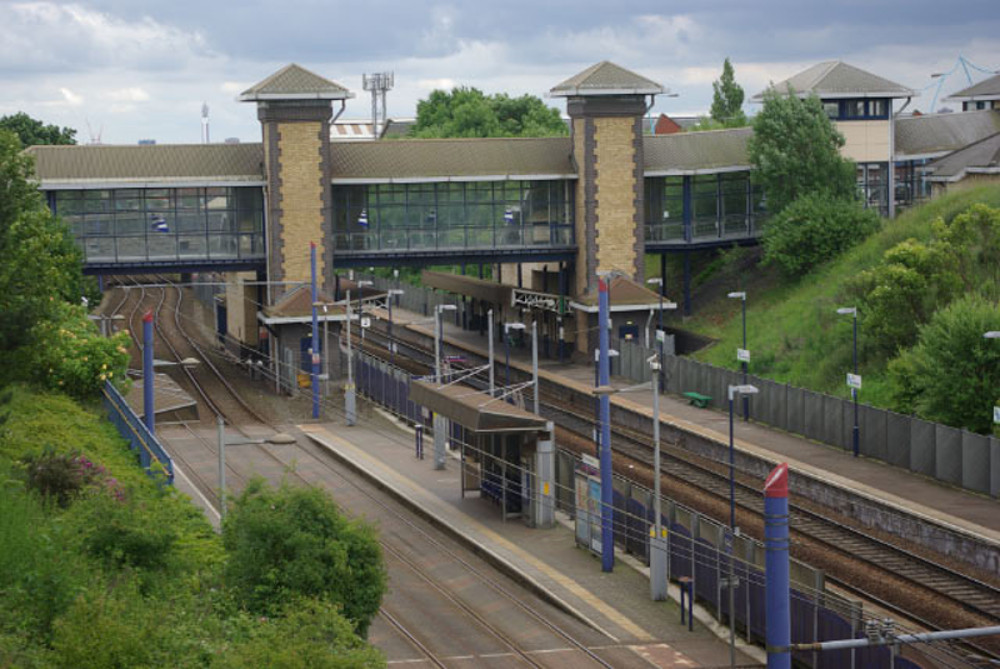
The Hawthorns station

The stadium is served by The Hawthorns station, which is both a railway station and West Midlands Metro tram stop. The station is approximately 500 yards (460 m) from the ground. Due to the large number of fans travelling in both directions to and from The Hawthorns on matchdays, trains run more frequently at those times, and have been known to depart every ten minutes. That has helped to reduce the time taken for travelling fans to leave West Bromwich and return home.

=== Bus ===
National Express West Midlands bus service 74, which runs between Birmingham and Dudley, passes the stadium along the A41 Birmingham Road. NXWM bus service 89, running between West Bromwich and Birmingham, passes near to the stadium. Although this is actually over 20mins walk from 89 to stadium, previously 450 served outside both Hawthorns station and went right by the ground.

Previously NXWM ran 79 from Birmingham to Wolverhampton and 78 Birmingham and Wednesbury both of which would have stopped outside the ground, due to Midland Metro running between Birmingham to Wolverhampton these services no longer run with the exception of the 79 which only covers part of the route from West Bromwich to Wolverhampton

=== Car ===
The ground is less than half a mile from Junction 1 on the M5 motorway.

== See also ==
- List of football stadiums in England
- List of stadiums in the United Kingdom by capacity
- Lists of stadiums
