= Jimmy Caskie =

Scottish footballer

Personal information
- Date of birth: 30 January 1914
- Place of birth: Possilpark, Scotland
- Date of death: 19 May 1977 (aged 63)
- Place of death: Glasgow, Scotland
- Position: Left winger

Senior career*
Years	Team	Apps	(Gls)
- Ashfield
1933–1939	St Johnstone	102	(13)
1939–1945	Everton	5	(1)
1945–1949	Rangers	26	(3)
1949–1951	Forfar Athletic	12	(2)
- Berwick Rangers

International career
1937–1941	Scottish League XI	3	(0)
1939–1944	Scotland (wartime)	10	(1)
- * Club domestic league appearances and goals

James Caskie (30 January 1914 – 19 May 1977) was a Scottish footballer who played for St Johnstone, Everton, St Mirren (wartime guest), Hibernian (wartime guest), Rangers, Forfar Athletic and Berwick Rangers. Caskie represented Scotland in several unofficial wartime internationals. He also represented the Scottish League XI three times, one of which was during the war.

His son, also Jimmy, played for Clydebank.
