= John Stewart Wright =

Scottish footballer (1890–1956)

Jackie Wright
Personal information
- Full name: John Stewart Wright
- Date of birth: 1890
- Place of birth: Port Glasgow, Scotland
- Date of death: 1956 (aged 65–66)
- Place of death: Port Glasgow, Scotland
- Position: Centre half

Youth career
- 1908–1911: Port Glasgow Athletic Juniors

Senior career*
Years	Team	Apps	(Gls)
1911–1924	Greenock Morton	389	(20)

International career
1913–1919	Scottish League XI	4	(0)
1917	Scottish League (wartime)	1	(0)
1918–1919	Scotland (wartime)	3	(1)

Managerial career
- 1927–1929: Greenock Morton
- 1934–1939: Greenock Morton
- * Club domestic league appearances and goals

John Stewart Wright (1890 – 1956) was a Scottish footballer who played for Morton as a centre half, making over 400 appearances for the club between 1911 and 1925. He was also the club's manager in two spells, between 1927 and 1929, and 1934 and 1939.

He initially played for hometown club Port Glasgow Athletic Juniors, and was selected twice for Scotland at that level in 1910 before moving up to the senior leagues with Morton. A large part of his career was interrupted by World War I (during which the club won the War Fund Shield in 1915 and were finalists in 1918. After the resumption of regular competitions he was in the team which claimed the Scottish Cup in 1922, the only major honour in Morton's history.

Wright was selected four times for the Scottish Football League XI and appeared in three wartime internationals, but never gained a full official cap for Scotland.

== See also ==
- List of one-club men in association football
