= Scotland national football team results (unofficial matches) =

- Win Draw Loss

From 1870 to the present day, the Scotland national football team have played various matches that are not accorded the status of official (FIFA) internationals by the governing body, the Scottish Football Association. These include early matches against England prior to the first-ever official international in 1872, wartime fixtures between 1914–1919 and 1939–1946 when official competitions were suspended, overseas tour matches played by a Scotland XI of varying strength and status, and others as specified.

While some of the tour matches (involving players under consideration for the national team, some having already been capped at full level) could be seen as similar in status to those played by the Scotland B team, they have not been recorded officially as such.

== List of Matches ==
=== 1870s–1910s ===
==== 1870–1872 England v Scotland matches ====
The selection of the Scottish XI were players drawn from living and working in and around London area. Some of the players' Scottish links were tenuous and in some cases non-existent.

Names of note included Alexander Morten, who played in the first match, Arnold Kirke-Smith, who played in two matches, and William Lindsay, who played in all five matches, of the Scotland representative team were all in fact later capped by the official England national team.

5 March 1870 International Friendly	England	1–1	Scotland	London
15:15	Baker 89'	Report 1 Report 2	Crawford 75'	Stadium: The Oval Cricket Ground; Attendance: 500

19 November 1870 International Friendly	England	1–0	Scotland	London
15:00	Walker 10'	Report 1 Report 2		Stadium: The Oval Cricket Ground; Attendance: 650; Referee: M.P. Betts / A. Morton

25 February 1871 International Friendly (Note: F McLean (alternatively Maclean, McClew or McClean) of the Scotland XI was discovered to be a pseudonym for Frederick Chappell who had no Scottish connections. He was capped by England in the first official international.)	England	1–1	Scotland	London
15:30	Walker	Report 1 Report 2	Nepean 15'	Stadium: The Oval Cricket Ground; Attendance: >500; Referee: C.M. Tebbut / R. Barker / W. Wallace

18 November 1871 International Friendly	England	2–1	Scotland	London
15:00	Walker	Report 1 Report 2	Tailyour	Stadium: The Oval Cricket Ground; Attendance: >600; Referee: A. Stair / G. Kennedy

24 February 1872 International Friendly	England	1–0	Scotland	London
15:25	Clegg	Report 1 Report 2		Stadium: The Oval Cricket Ground; Attendance: <1000; Referee: A. Morten

==== 1880 ====
In 1880, a Scottish tour of Canada and the United States was suggested. Several preparatory matches were played, mostly against club sides and including a mini-tour of northern England, with the potential traveling squad referred to as the 'Scotch Canadians'. However, the tour itself never went ahead after the death of its main organiser, SFA secretary William Dick. Four matches are detailed below:

A match was scheduled with Morton on May 22, but was cancelled because the Greenock Academy directors refused them permission to use Academy Park.

1 January 1880 Friendly	Rangers	2–3	Scotland	Kinning Park
	Goal		Goal	Stadium: Kinning Park; Attendance: 1,500; Referee: J. A. Allan

2 January 1880 Friendly	Tyne and District	0–5	Scotland	Newcastle
				Attendance: 2000

3 January 1880 Friendly	Blackburn Rovers	1–8	Scotland	Blackburn
				Stadium: Alexandra Meadows; Attendance: 3000

7 February 1880 Friendly	Darwen	3–7	Scotland
				Attendance: 6000

9 February 1880 Friendly	Manchester Wanderers	1–8	Scotland	Manchester Cricket Club

10 February 1880 Friendly	Nottingham Forest	0–2	Scotland	West Bridgford
				Stadium: Trent Bridge; Attendance: 6,000

14 February 1880 Friendly	Scottish Counties	2–2	Scotland	Kinning Park
	Beveridge 30'; T. Patterson 86'		Ker; Smith 88'	Stadium: Kinning Park

21 February 1880 Friendly (Note: Trial match for the Ayrshire FA XI ahead of its match with Lancashire FA XI on February 28.)	Ayrshire	1–3	Scotland	Kilmarnock
				Stadium: Rugby Park

13 March 1880 Friendly	Heart of Midlothian	1–5	Scotland	Edinburgh
	C. Nelson		Campbell; J. Galloway; W. Struthers; T. Masterton (o.g.)	Stadium: Powderhall; Attendance: 500

20 March 1880 Friendly	Abercorn/St Mirren XI	1–8	Scotland	Paisley
				Stadium: Thistle Park

17 April 1880 Friendly	Hibernian	0–3	Scotland	Leith
			Kay 30'; Ferguson; Smith	Stadium: Hibernian Park; Attendance: 5,000

23 June 1880 Friendly	Johnstone XI	3–7	Scotland

==== 1888 ====
21 April 1888 Friendly	Aberdeen XI	1–6	Scotland	Aberdeen
				Stadium: The Chanonry; Attendance: 4,000

24 April 1888 Friendly	Motherwell	1–2	Scotland	Motherwell
				Stadium: Roman Road Park; Attendance: 5,000

19 September 1888 International Friendly (Note: Part of a Canadian tour of the United Kingdom, and coinciding with the 1888 International Exhibition in Glasgow.)	Scotland	4–0	Canada	Glasgow
	McCall; Berry	Report		Stadium: Kelvingrove Park; Attendance: 6,000

==== 1891 ====
21 March 1891 Friendly (Note: Warm-up prior to match against England, organised by Queen's Park officials. Played on same day as a Scotland v Wales fixture.)	Scotland	9–2	(England) Corinthian FC	Glasgow
	Sellar 35' 40'; Watt 41' 44' 89'; Baird 50' 53'; Rankin	Report	Clarke 12'; Currey 20'	Stadium: Hampden Park (II); Attendance: 10,000; Referee: (Scotland) Bishop

3 October 1891 International Friendly (Note: Part of a tour of the United Kingdom, organised by the Western Football Association in Canada but also involving several players from the United States.)	Scotland	5–1	(Canada) (United States) Canadian-Americans	Govan
	Hamilton 37' 78'; McCreadie 47'; Bell 85'	Report	Bell	Stadium: Ibrox Park; Attendance: 4,000; Referee: (Ireland) J. Reid

==== 1900 ====
- A testimonial match for Everton's Scottish player Willie Muir in September 1900 was played between 'Englishmen' and 'Scotchmen' based at Merseyside clubs; the Scots won 2–1.

==== 1901 ====
- An exhibition match with Germany was scheduled for 28 September 1901 as part of the Glasgow International Exhibition, but was cancelled due to a disagreement over funds; the visiting German team lost 12–0 to England's amateur team a few days earlier.

==== 1902 ====
5 April 1902 International Friendly (Note: This was scheduled as a full international and was the title decider in the 1901–02 British Home Championship. A capacity crowd was in attendance. During the first half, a new wooden stand collapsed, killing 25 and injuring 500. The match was played to a conclusion to mitigate any further crowd panic, but was not recorded as a full international fixture. The official match was replayed in England a month later.)	Scotland	1–1	England	Govan
15:30	Brown 25'	Report 1 Report 2	Settle 44'	Stadium: Ibrox Park; Attendance: 68,114; Referee: J. Torrans

9 August 1902 International Friendly (Note: Benefit match for the 1902 Ibrox disaster relief fund - also coinciding with the Coronation of Edward VII and Alexandra.)	Ireland	0–3	Scotland	Belfast
15:30		Report 1 Report 2	Speedie 30'; Campbell 40'; McDermott 60'	Stadium: Balmoral Showgrounds; Attendance: 3,000; Referee: J. Torrans

- A testimonial match for Liverpool's Scottish player William Goldie in November 1902 was played between an 'England Select XI ' and a 'Scotland Select XI' drawn from players at Merseyside clubs; the Scots won 4–0.

==== 1913 ====
- A testimonial match for Rangers and Scotland winger Alec Smith was played in January 1913 between Rangers and an 'International XI' including the retired RS McColl, but this featured Wales international Billy Meredith.

==== 1914 ====
- A testimonial match for Partick Thistle and Scotland player Alex Raisbeck was played in January 1914 between Partick and an 'International XI' team, but this included England international Jack Parkinson and several other players who had never played for Scotland.

=== World War I ===
By the end of the first year of fighting during World War I, most official football tournaments were suspended (a notable exception was the Scottish Football League Division One). International matches took place very occasionally during the duration of the war itself (July 1914 to November 1918) with Scotland only playing two, both military benefit matches against England. Following the Allied victory, regular sports events began to return, and Scotland played in two Victory International matches against Ireland followed by two against England in Spring 1919. Established competitions and fully recognised international matches resumed in the 1919–20 season.

==== 1915 ====
A fundraising match for the Belgian Refugee Relief Fund was played between an 'International XI' and an 'Edinburgh XI' in April 1915; the internationals included England's Joseph Hodkinson, Billy Meredith of Wales and William Crone who had played for the Irish League (Bobby Walker and Peter Nellies of Hearts also switched sides pre-match to cover for call-offs).

13 May 1916 International Friendly	England	4–3	Scotland	Liverpool
	Smith 7'; Hampton 20'; Abrams 41'; Mosscrop 84'	Report	Scott 40'; J. Reid 46' (penalty missed); Galt 52'	Stadium: Goodison Park; Attendance: 22,000

8 June 1918 International Friendly (Note: Fundraising benefit match for the Sir Douglas Haig Base Hospitals. Jimmy McMullan played for England after squad members had to pull out at short notice.)	Scotland	2–0	England	Glasgow
	Archibald; McLean	Report		Stadium: Celtic Park; Attendance: 45,000

22 March 1919 Victory International	Scotland	2–1	Ireland	Glasgow
	Wilson (pen.)	Report 1 Report 2	Halligan	Stadium: Ibrox Stadium; Attendance: 50,000; Referee: A. A. Jackson

19 April 1919 Victory International	Ireland	0–0	Scotland	Belfast
	Rollo (penalty missed)	Report 1 Report 2		Stadium: Windsor Park; Attendance: 44,000; Referee: W. Cowan

26 April 1919 Victory International	England	2–2	Scotland	Liverpool
	Turnbull; Puddefoot 75'	Report 1 Report 2	Wright 2'; Bowie	Stadium: Goodison Park; Attendance: 45,000; Referee: A. Warner

3 May 1919 Victory International	Scotland	3–4	England	Glasgow
	Wilson 50' (pen.), 87'; Morton 65'	Report 1 Report 2	Grimsdell 20', 35'; Puddefoot 37', 67'	Stadium: Hampden Park; Attendance: 80,000; Referee: A. A. Jackson

=== 1920s–1940s ===
==== 1920 ====
- A Testimonial match for Partick Thistle and Scotland player Jimmy McMullan was played in April 1920 between Partick and an 'International Select' team.

3 May 1920 Testimonial (Note: Benefit match for Rangers and Scotland player Jimmy Gordon. Match went ahead as scheduled despite the death of the club's manager William Wilton a day earlier.)	Rangers	1–0	Scotland	Glasgow
	Laird	Report		Stadium: Ibrox Park; Attendance: 10,000; Referee: A. A. Jackson

==== 1921 Tour of USA and Canada ====
A Scotland XI tour of Canada and the USA was organised by Glasgow club Third Lanark and the Dominion of Canada Football Association. Some local publications of the time listed the visitors as 'Third Lanark', others as 'Scotland'.

- Squad:

- Alec Bennett (Albion Rovers)
- Craig Brown (Motherwell)
- Jimmy Brownlie (Third Lanark)
- Willie Bulloch (Partick Thistle)
- Jimmy Gordon (Dunfermline Athletic)
- John Low (Dunfermline Athletic)
- Tom Maxwell (Dunfermline Athletic)
- Willie McAndrew (Third Lanark)
- Neil McBain (Ayr United)
- Charlie McCormack (Third Lanark)
- Jimmy McMenemy (Partick Thistle)
- Bobby Orr (Third Lanark)
- Willie Rankin (Motherwell)
- James Scott (Dumbarton)
- Doug Thomson (Aberdeen)
- Andy Wilson (Dunfermline Athletic)

- 25 matches were played, with 24 wins, 1 draw and 0 defeats. 1 match is detailed below:

9 July 1921 International Friendly	Canada	0–1	Scotland	Montreal
		Report 1 Report 2	Rankin	Stadium: Alexander Park; Attendance: 6,000; Referee: B. Dean

==== 1923 ====
- Third Lanark undertook another summer tour in 1923, this time to South America (eight matches), and again guest players from other clubs were invited, the most high-profile being Hughie Ferguson, but although apparently some attempt was made to portray this as a 'Scotland team', this was much less prevalent than for the 1921 tour and only one of the players had been capped at full level (Robert Orrock who played in one match ten years earlier).

==== 1927 ====
- A testimonial match for Bradford City defender Willie Watson was played in April 1927 between Bradford and a 'Scottish Internationals' team, but this included Ireland international Bert Manderson and several other players who had never played for Scotland.

==== 1927 Tour of USA and Canada ====
A Scotland XI tour of North America was organised by the SFA in 1927.

- Squad:

- Sandy Archibald (Rangers)
- Danny Blair (Clyde)
- Jock Buchanan (Morton)
- Willie Cook (Dundee)
- Tully Craig (Rangers)
- Andy Cunningham (Rangers)
- Patsy Gallacher (Falkirk)
- Tom Hamilton (Rangers)
- John Hunter (Falkirk)
- Adam McLean (Celtic)
- Jimmy McStay (Celtic)
- Willie McStay (Celtic)
- Tom Morrison (St Mirren)
- Tommy Muirhead (Rangers)
- Jimmy Munro (St Johnstone)
- Tom Scott (Falkirk)
- Jimmy Simpson (Dundee United)
- Andy Swallow (St Johnstone)

- 20 matches were played, with 19 wins, 0 draws and 1 defeat. 3 matches are detailed below:

28 May 1927 Friendly	Ontario All-Stars	3–2	Scotland	Toronto
	Graham; Faulkner		Gallacher; McLean	Referee: W. Mitchell

29 June 1927 Friendly	Hakoah Vienna	1–4	Scotland	Winnipeg
	Grünwald		Muirhead; Munro; Cunningham	Attendance: 12,000; Referee: S. McMahon (Canada)

10 July 1927 Friendly	Ontario All-Stars	0–10	Scotland	Toronto
			Munro; McLean; Cunningham; Hunter	Attendance: 12,000; Referee: A. McNeilly

==== 1929 ====
28 May 1929 International Friendly (Note: This match was played two days after another in Bergen, a 7–3 win for Scotland which is considered official by the SFA but not by the Norwegian Football Federation. Neither body considers the 4–0 match to be official.)	Norway	0–4	Scotland	Oslo
		Report 1 Report 2	Fleming; Rankin; Nisbet	Stadium: Ullevaal Stadion; Attendance: 8,000

- A friendly match between Scotland and the Netherlands in June 1929 was retrospectively considered not to be official by the Royal Dutch Football Association due to their disapproval of professionalism in the sport–all the Scotland players were professionals. The SFA regards it as official.

==== 1932 ====
- A friendly match in Copenhagen on 9 October 1932 in which Denmark defeated the Scotland amateur team 3–1 (James Paul scored the Scottish goal) is regarded as a full international by the Danish Football Union, and consequently has sometimes been included in overviews of matches between the nations.

==== 1935 Tour of USA and Canada ====
A Scotland XI tour of North America was organised by the SFA in 1935.

- Squad:

- Andrew Anderson (Heart of Midlothian)
- George Cummings (Partick Thistle)
- Bob Donnelly (Partick Thistle)
- Dally Duncan (Derby County)
- Alex Ferguson (St Johnstone)
- Bob Fraser (Aberdeen
- Hughie Gallacher (Derby County)
- Bobby Main (Rangers)
- Whitey McDonald (Rangers) (Note: McDonald was an Irish international who earned two caps between 1930–32.)
- Davie Meiklejohn (Rangers)
- Willie Miller (Partick Thistle)
- Willie Mills (Aberdeen)
- Tom Smith (Kilmarnock)
- William Stevenson (Clyde)
- Tommy Walker (Heart of Midlothian)
- Dave Wilson (Hamilton Academical) (Note: Wilson was of English nationality.)
- Peter Wilson (Celtic)

- 13 matches were played, with 13 wins, 0 draws and 0 defeats. 2 matches are detailed below:

19 May 1935 International Friendly (Note: Regarded as a full international by the United States Soccer Federation.)	United States (Note: Playing as Eastern USA All-Stars.)	1–5	Scotland	New York City
	McEwan	Report 1 Report 2	Mills; Duncan; Meiklejohn	Stadium: Polo Grounds; Attendance: 22,970

9 June 1935 International Friendly (Note: Regarded as a full international by the United States Soccer Federation.)	United States (Note: Playing as Eastern USA All-Stars.)	1–4	Scotland	Roseville, Newark, New Jersey
	Moorhouse	Report 1 Report 2	Gallacher; Mills; Duncan; Meiklejohn	Stadium: Newark Schools Stadium; Attendance: 8,436

==== 1935 ====
8 May 1935 International Friendly (Note: King's Silver Jubilee Trust Fund International.)	(Note: Selection of players with London-based clubs.)England	0–1	Scotland (Note: Selection of 'Anglo-Scots' playing for English Football League clubs–the Scottish touring squad bound for North America sailed from Southampton on the same day.)	London
		Report 1 Report 2	Mutch 79'	Stadium: Arsenal Stadium; Attendance: 8,944

21 August 1935 International Friendly	Scotland	4–2	England	Glasgow
	Delaney 8'; Armstrong 30'; Walker 44' (pen.)	Report 1 Report 2	Gurney 82'; Westwood 87'	Stadium: Hampden Park; Attendance: 56,300; Referee: W. Webb

==== 1939 Tour of USA and Canada ====
A Scotland XI tour of North America was organised by the SFA in 1939.

- Squad:

- Bobby Bolt (Falkirk)
- Jimmy Carabine (Third Lanark)
- Jimmy Caskie (St Johnstone)
- Jerry Dawson (Rangers)
- Jimmy Dykes (Heart of Midlothian)
- Ben Ellis (Motherwell) (Note: Ellis was a Welsh international who earned six caps between 1931–36.)
- Archie Garrett (Heart of Midlothian)
- John Gillies (Clyde)
- Dougie Gray (Rangers)
- George Hamilton (Aberdeen)
- Jack Jones (Third Lanark)
- Willie Lyon (Celtic) (Note: Lyon was of English nationality.)
- Doug McAvoy (Kilmarnock)
- Malky MacDonald (Celtic)
- Tommy McIntyre (Hibernian)
- Tommy McKenzie (Motherwell)
- Sandy McNab (West Bromwich Albion)

- 14 matches were played, with 13 wins, 1 draw and 0 defeats. 2 matches are detailed below:

21 May 1939 International Friendly	United States (Note: Playing as Eastern USA All-Stars.)	1–1	Scotland	New York City
	Nemchik	Report	Garrett	Stadium: Polo Grounds; Attendance: 25,072

18 June 1939 International Friendly	United States (Note: Playing as American Soccer League Stars.)	2–4 (aet)	Scotland	New York City
	Boyle; Altemose	Report	Carabine; Gillies	Stadium: Polo Grounds; Attendance: 15,196

=== World War II ===
Official football tournaments were suspended soon after the outbreak of World War II in Autumn 1939. International matches took place occasionally during the duration of the war itself, with Scotland playing against England 15 times, a team representing the Republic of Ireland once, and various branches of the British armed forces who could call on strong squads of professional players called into service. In addition, there were six 'Army Internationals' nominally between Scotland and England, but with the players selected from members of the military stationed in each country regardless of their heritage (the 'Army in England' team won five of these, with one draw).

When the conflict ended in May 1945 with an Allied victory, regular sports events began to return, and Scotland participated in, and won, the 1945–46 British Victory Home Championship. Two further Victory International matches in 1946 against Belgium and Switzerland are considered to have full international status. All established competitions and fully recognised international matches resumed in the 1946–47 season, the outset of which included one further unofficial England v Scotland match to raise funds for those affected by the Burnden Park disaster earlier that year.

2 December 1939 International Friendly (Note: After two English players were injured in a traffic accident on their way to the match, two players from the local club Newcastle United who had been in the crowd as spectators appeared for England, including Tommy Pearson, a Scot who later also appeared for his native country.)	England	2–1	Scotland	Newcastle-upon-Tyne
	Clifton; Lawton; Carter (penalty missed)	Report 1 Report 2	Dodds	Stadium: St James' Park; Attendance: 15,000; Referee: H. Nattrass

16 March 1940 Friendly	Scotland	2–2	British Army	Galashiels
	Anderson 65'; Gillies 75'	Report	Martin; Miller	Stadium: Galabank; Attendance: 7,000

20 April 1940 Friendly	British Army	1–5	Scotland	Berwick-upon-Tweed
	Carrigan	Report	Gilmour; Wallace	Stadium: Shielfield Park

24 April 1940 Friendly	Scotland	4–1	British Army	Edinburgh
	Walker; McCulloch		Compton	Stadium: Tynecastle Park; Attendance: 7,650; Referee: R. B. Carruthers

28 April 1940 International Friendly (Note: 'Representative XI' match organised between the Football Association of Ireland and the Glasgow FA, drawing Scotland's players from clubs in the city. Had some characteristics of an inter-league fixture (a contemporary highlights video makes reference to Scotland's 'revenge' for defeat the previous year, which was a win for the League of Ireland XI over the Scottish Football League XI in 1939) but documentation shows it was not organised as such.)	Ireland (FAI)	2–3	Scotland	Dublin
	Bradshaw; Dunne	Report	McKennan; Gillick; Dewar	Stadium: Dalymount Park; Attendance: 21,630; Referee: (England) P. Snape

11 May 1940 International Friendly	Scotland	1–1	England	Glasgow
	Dougal	Report 1 Report 2	Welsh	Stadium: Hampden Park; Attendance: 75,000; Referee: W. Webb

14 December 1940 Friendly	Scotland	4–2	British Army	Kirkcaldy
	Milne 15'; Brown 55'; Gilmartin 70'; McIntosh	Report	McCartney 75'; Stevenson 76'	Stadium: Stark's Park; Attendance: 7,000

25 January 1941 Friendly	Scotland	1–0	British Army	Dundee
	Flavell	Report		Stadium: Dens Park; Attendance: 4,000

8 February 1941 International Friendly	England	2–3	Scotland	Newcastle-upon-Tyne
	Birkett 7'; Lawton 41'	Report 1 Report 2	Bacuzzi 17' (o.g.); Wallace 45', 67'	Stadium: St James' Park; Attendance: 25,000; Referee: T. Thompson

19 April 1941 Friendly	Scotland (Note: Stanley Matthews guested for Scotland.)	2–1	Scottish Command	Aberdeen
	Mills 17'; Wallace (pen.), 80'	Report	Yorston 38'	Stadium: Linksfield Stadium; Attendance: 8,000; Referee: W. Jeffrey

3 May 1941 International Friendly	Scotland	1–3	England	Glasgow
	Venters 10'	Report 1 Report 2	Welsh 44' 87'; Goulden	Stadium: Hampden Park; Attendance: 78,000; Referee: P. Craigmyle

17 May 1941 Friendly	Scotland	5–0	British Army	Methil
	Wallace; Stead; Mills	Report		Stadium: Bayview Park

20 September 1941 Friendly	Scotland	1–2	British Army	Dumfries
	Walker (pen.)	Report	Hagan; Birkett	Stadium: Palmerston Park; Attendance: 9,000

4 October 1941 International Friendly	England	2–0	Scotland	London
	Welsh; Hagan	Report 1 Report 2		Stadium: Wembley; Attendance: 65,000; Referee: F.S. Milner

17 January 1942 International Friendly	England	3–0	Scotland	London
	Lawton; Hagan	https://www.londonhearts.com/scotlandunoff/games/19420117.html Report 1 Report 2		Stadium: Wembley; Attendance: 64,000; Referee: W.E. Ross Gower

18 April 1942 International Friendly	Scotland	5–4	England	Glasgow
	Liddell; Dodds; Shankly	Report 1 Report 2	Lawton; Hagan	Stadium: Hampden Park; Attendance: 91,000; Referee: R. Calder

19 September 1942 Friendly	Scotland	1–3	British Army	Dumfries
	Walker	Report	Lewis 15' 29'; Mullen 40'	Stadium: Palmerston Park; Attendance: 8,000

10 October 1942 International Friendly	England	0–0	Scotland	London
		Report 1 Report 2		Stadium: Wembley; Attendance: 75,000; Referee: P. Stevens

5 December 1942 Friendly	Royal Air Force	4–0	Scotland	Newcastle upon Tyne
	Carter			Stadium: St James' Park; Attendance: 40,000

17 April 1943 International Friendly	Scotland	0–4	England	Glasgow
		Report 1 Report 2	Carter 3' 10'; Westcott; D. Compton	Stadium: Hampden Park; Attendance: 137,363; Referee: P. Craigmyle

16 October 1943 International Friendly	England	8–0	Scotland	Manchester
	Lawton; Carter; Hagan; Matthews	Report 1 Report 2		Stadium: Maine Road; Attendance: 60,000

6 November 1943 Friendly	Scotland	1–2	Royal Air Force	Glasgow
	Fagan		Carter; Drake	Stadium: Hampden Park; Attendance: 50,000

19 February 1944 International Friendly	England	6–2	Scotland	London
	Hagan 37'; Macaulay 48' (o.g.); Lawton; Carter; Mercer	Report 1 Report 2	Dodds 38'	Stadium: Wembley; Attendance: 80,000

22 April 1944 International Friendly	Scotland	2–3	England	Glasgow
	Caskie 19'; Dodds 66'	Report 1 Report 2	Lawton 22' 34'; Carter 37'	Stadium: Hampden Park; Attendance: 132,835

14 October 1944 International Friendly	England	6–2	Scotland	London
	Lawton 56'; Carter 37'; Goulden; L. Smith	Report 1 Report 2	Milne 3'; Walker	Stadium: Wembley; Attendance: 90,000; Referee: G. Reader

25 November 1944 Friendly	Royal Air Force	1–7	Scotland	Sheffield
	Mortensen 87'	Report	Liddell 26' 75'; Fagan 36'; Black 40' 50'; Dodds 55'; Busby 80' (pen.)	Stadium: Hillsborough; Attendance: 40,172; Referee: A. W. Cutts

6 January 1945 International Friendly	Belgium	2–3	Scotland (Note: An SFA-approved 'Scottish Services' team of serving Armed Forces personnel.)	Brussels
	Buyle 20'; Coppens 60'		Black 21'; Fagan 70'	Stadium: Edmond Machtens Stadium; Attendance: 25,000

7 January 1945 International Friendly	Flanders	6–4	Scotland	Bruges
	Vaillant; Vogt; Echeman; Chaves		Black (pen.); Dodds	Attendance: 25,000

3 February 1945 International Friendly	England	3–2	Scotland	Birmingham
	Brown; Mortensen	Report 1 Report 2	Delaney; Dodds	Stadium: Villa Park; Attendance: 65,800; Referee: T. Smith

14 April 1945 International Friendly	Scotland	1–6	England	Glasgow
	L. Johnston 38'	Report 1 Report 2	Carter 29'; Lawton; Brown; L. Smith (pen.)	Stadium: Hampden Park; Attendance: 134,479; Referee: J.S. Cox

17 November 1945 Friendly	Combined Services	2–4	Scotland	Celle
	Westcott; Lewis		Delaney; Walker	Stadium: Highbury; Attendance: 12,000

18 November 1945 Friendly	Combined Services	1–1	Scotland	Hamburg
	Westcott 64'	Report	Garth 10'	Stadium: Bahrenfeld; Attendance: 35,000

==== British Victory Home Championship ====
10 November 1945 BVHC	Scotland	2–0	Wales	Glasgow
	Waddell 14'; Dodds 66'	Report 1 Report 2		Stadium: Hampden Park; Attendance: 92,323; Referee: M.C. Dale

2 February 1946 BVHC	Ireland	2–3	Scotland	Belfast
	Walsh 18', 43'	Report 1 Report 2	Liddell 19', 79'; Hamilton 56'	Stadium: Windsor Park; Attendance: 53,000; Referee: D. Maxwell

13 April 1946 BVHC	Scotland	1–0	England	Glasgow
	Delaney 90'	Report 1 Report 2		Stadium: Hampden Park; Attendance: 139,642; Referee: P. Craigmyle

==== 1946 ====
24 August 1946 International Friendly (Note: Fundraising match for the Burnden Park disaster.)	England	2–2	Scotland	Manchester
	Welsh 45' (pen.)	Report 1 Report 2	Thornton 89'	Stadium: Maine Road; Attendance: 70,000; Referee: G. Dutton

==== 1947 ====
- On 10 May 1947, a Great Britain XI played a Europe XI at Hampden Park to commemorate the Home Nations rejoining FIFA. The GB team, which won the match 6–1 in front of over 130,000, wore the dark blue of Scotland to acknowledge the venue, but only three Scottish players were involved.

28 May 1947 Friendly	BAOR	4–3	Scotland	Hamburg
	Thompson; Dutchman; Lee	Report	Young; Pearson	Attendance: 30,000

==== 1949 ====
23 February 1949 Friendly	Scotland	7–1	British Army	Edinburgh
	Turnbull; Mason; Ormond; Willie Thornton	Report	Johnstone; McPhail (penalty missed)	Stadium: Tynecastle Park; Attendance: 20,224

==== 1949 Tour of USA and Canada ====
A Scotland XI tour of North America was organised by the SFA in 1949.

- Squad:

- George Aitken (East Fife)
- Jimmy Brown (Heart of Midlothian)
- Sammy Cox (Rangers)
- Bobby Evans (Celtic)
- Jock Govan (Hibernian)
- Billy Houliston (Queen of the South)
- Johnny MacKenzie (Partick Thistle)
- Tommy Orr (Morton)
- Willie Redpath (Motherwell)
- Lawrie Reilly (Hibernian)
- Billy Steel (Derby County)
- Willie Telfer (St Mirren)
- Willie Thornton (Rangers)
- Willie Waddell (Rangers)
- Willie Woodburn (Rangers)
- George Young (Rangers)

- 9 matches were played, with 8 wins, 0 draws and 1 defeat. 3 matches are detailed below:

29 May 1949 Friendly	Belfast Celtic	2–0	Scotland	Randalls Island, New York City
	Campbell 27'	Report		Stadium: Triborough Stadium; Attendance: 15,000; Referee: F. Coggins (United States)

30 May 1949 International Friendly	United States (Note: Playing as American Soccer League Stars.)	1–4	Scotland	Randalls Island, New York City
		Report	Evans; Thornton; Steel; Houliston	Stadium: Triborough Stadium; Referee: J. Stevenson

19 June 1949 International Friendly (Note: Regarded as a full international by the United States Soccer Federation.)	United States	0–4	Scotland	Randalls Island, New York City
		Report 1 Report 2	Waddell; Steel	Stadium: Aarhus Stadion; Attendance: 17,000; Referee: S. Galin

=== 1950s–1970s ===
==== 1952 ====
3 March 1952 Friendly	British Army	1–3	Scotland	Newcastle upon Tyne
	Parry 4'	Report	McMillan 30' 55'	Stadium: St James' Park; Attendance: 13,890

==== 1953 ====
2 March 1953 Friendly	Scotland	2–1	British Army	Glasgow
	Johnstone 6'; Davidson 72' (pen.)	Report	Hooper 85'	Stadium: Hampden Park; Attendance: 15,000; Referee: W. Brittle

30 April 1953 Testimonial (Note: Benefit match for Third Lanark and Scotland player Jimmy Mason.)	Scotland	5–0	Sunderland	Glasgow
	Liddell 17'; McPhail 59' 67' 73'; Wright 80'	Report		Stadium: Cathkin Park; Attendance: 13,860

18 November 1953 Friendly	British Army	2–3	Scotland	Liverpool
	Quixall 47'; Simpson 68'	Report	Fernie 7'; Reilly 71'; Baird 83' (pen.)	Stadium: Goodison Park; Attendance: 8,208

==== 1954 ====
16 November 1954 Friendly	Kilmarnock	0–2	Scotland	Kilmarnock
		Report	McMillan 39'; Leggat 62'	Stadium: Rugby Park; Referee: R. Davidson

22 November 1954 Friendly	Hibernian	0–3	Scotland	Edinburgh
	Turnbull (penalty missed)	Report	Johnstone 10'; Bauld 32'; Wardhaugh	Stadium: Easter Road; Referee: C.E. Faultless

30 November 1954 Friendly	Falkirk	4–4	Scotland	Falkirk
	McCrae 49' 89'; Parker (pen.), 82'; Morrison 84'	Report	Johnstone 4'; Reilly 52'; Ring 75' 78'	Stadium: Brockville Park; Referee: G. Mitchell

==== 1955 ====
21 February 1955 Friendly (Note: This was a trial preceding a scheduled 'B international' between Scotland and England due to be played in Glasgow a few weeks later, however that match was cancelled due to weather conditions.)	Scotland B	3–2	Scotland	Edinburgh
	Davidson; Gemmell	Report	Buckley	Stadium: Easter Road; Attendance: 7,000; Referee: I. C. Inglis

7 December 1955 Friendly	Scotland	3–1	British Army	Rutherglen
	Reilly 34'; Henderson 35'; Collins 55'	Report	Dunmore 61'	Stadium: Shawfield Stadium; Attendance: 16,000; Referee: J. Mowat

==== 1956 ====
12 March 1956 International Friendly	Scotland	2–1	South Africa (Note: This was an 'Anglo-African' team of players from South Africa who were based at clubs in the United Kingdom, including two Rangers players, Johnny Hubbard and Don Kitchenbrand. As Scotland did not select any Rangers players, many of the crowd at Ibrox opted to cheer for South Africa on the night. It was a warm-up for Scotland's 1955–56 British Home Championship decider against England a few weeks later; reports indicated the most impressive player was South Africa's defender John Hewie, who was eligible for Scotland and made his debut in the England match, along with Scottish goalscorer Graham Leggat who had also played at Ibrox.)	Glasgow
	Reilly; Collins		Hubbard 83' (pen.)	Stadium: Ibrox Stadium; Attendance: 60,000; Referee: J. Mowat

14 May 1956 (Note: Belgrove F.C. exhibition match. Three Scots were involved: Allan Brown, Willie Cunningham and Tommy Docherty.)	Ireland-Wales (Republic of Ireland)	3–3	England-Scotland	Dublin, Ireland
	J P Dunne; Allchurch 2		Thompson; Langton; Allen	Stadium: Dalymount Park; Referee: J Scully

==== 1958 ====
3 February 1958 Friendly (Note: Warm-up match for the 1958 FIFA World Cup.)	Scottish League XI	2–3	Scotland	Edinburgh
	Murray 8'; Young 53'; Mackay (penalty missed)	Report	Mudie 18'; Currie 48'; Imlach 63'	Stadium: Easter Road; Attendance: 45,436; Referee: G. Mitchell

17 February 1958 Friendly	Rangers	1–1	Scotland	Glasgow
	Murray 5'	Report	Mudie 17'	Stadium: Ibrox Park; Attendance: 60,000; Referee: R. Davidson

3 March 1958 Friendly	Heart of Midlothian	3–2	Scotland	Edinburgh
19:30	Young 38'; Hamilton 55'; Mackay 89'	Report	Ormond 57'; Collins 66'	Stadium: Tynecastle Park; Attendance: 29,000; Referee: J. H. Phillips

5 June 1958 Friendly	IFK Eskilstuna	0–2	Scotland	Eskilstuna
		Report	Mudie 42', 76'	Stadium: Tunavallen

12 November 1958 Friendly	Scotland	1–1	British Army	Edinburgh
	Law 4'	Report	Hitchens 32'	Stadium: Tynecastle Park; Attendance: 11,000; Referee: J. Bissett

15 December 1958 Testimonial (Note: Benefit match for Hibernian and Scotland player Lawrie Reilly. As he had retired through injury and was no longer registered as a player, Reilly was not permitted to feature for Hibs or the Scotland team.)	Hibernian	9–3	Scotland (Note: This was an 'International Select' XI featuring ten Scottish internationals (136 caps between them) and Celtic player Bertie Peacock of Northern Ireland.)	Edinburgh
	Ormond; Turnbull; Baker 53'; Fox 74'; Preston; Smith	Report	Johnstone 1', 55' (pen.); Mudie	Stadium: Easter Road; Attendance: 6,500; Referee: J. Bissett

==== 1959 ====
16 March 1959 Friendly	Scottish League XI	6–5	Scotland	Glasgow
	White 13', 19', 60'; Kerr 55', 65', 82'	Report	Colrain 20', 49', 73'; Mackay 34', 38'	Stadium: Ibrox Park; Attendance: 40,000; Referee: T. Wharton

24 May 1959 International Friendly	Jutland	3–3	Scotland	Aarhus
	Kjær 62'; Nielsen 65'; Pedersen 76' (pen.)	Report 1 Report 2	Law 24'; Kerr 26'; Auld 75'	Stadium: Aarhus Stadion; Attendance: 6,000; Referee: C.F. Jørgensen

==== 1960 ====
1 February 1960 Friendly	Scottish League XI	2–2	Scotland	Glasgow
	Cousin 48'; Scott 70'	Report	Law 31', 84'	Stadium: Ibrox Park; Attendance: 40,000; Referee: J. H. Phillips

==== 1961 ====
30 January 1961 Friendly	Scottish League XI	1–4	Scotland	Glasgow
	McCann 9'	Report	Brand 19'; Herd 49'; Hilley 59'	Stadium: Celtic Park; Attendance: 24,000; Referee: T. Wharton

==== 1962 ====
5 February 1962 Friendly	Scotland	2–2	Scottish League XI	Glasgow
	Gilzean 19'	Report	Carroll 31'; Quinn 85'	Stadium: Hampden Park; Attendance: 8,164; Referee: T. Wharton

==== 1963 ====
- Scotland's friendly against Austria in 1963 was abandoned by the referee on 79 minutes due to violent play, particularly by the Austrians; however caps were awarded and it is recognised as a full international by FIFA.

==== 1964 ====
24 February 1964 Friendly	Scottish League XI	1–3	Scotland	Glasgow
	McParland 12'	Report	McBride 21', 41'; McIlroy 82'	Stadium: Ibrox Park; Attendance: 16,660; Referee: J. H. Phillips

11 November 1964 Friendly (Note: Posthumous benefit for John White, the Tottenham and Scotland player killed by lightning. Postponed from original date the previous day due to fog. Alan Gilzean's performance induced Tottenham to sign him from Dundee a short time later.)	Tottenham Hotspur	2–6	Scotland	London
	T. White 9'; Marchi 75'		Wilson 11'; Gilzean 63' 82'; Martin 75' 79'; Wallace 80'	Stadium: White Hart Lane; Attendance: 29,375; Referee: L. Callaghan (Wales)

==== 1966 ====
2 May 1966 Testimonial (Note: Benefit match for Alex Dowdells, Celtic, Leicester City and Scotland trainer.)	Leicester City	1–1	Scotland	Leicester
	Dougan 16'	Report	Penman 60'	Stadium: Filbert Street; Attendance: 8,020; Referee: J. Finney

==== 1967 Tour ====
A Scotland XI tour of Israel, Hong Kong, Australia, New Zealand and Canada was organised by the SFA in 1967. In October 2021, the SFA announced that some of the tour matches (against Australia, Canada and Israel) would be reclassified as full internationals. This meant that some players who had not otherwise played for Scotland were belatedly awarded international caps, including Alex Ferguson.

Two further planned tour matches were scrapped, against a Chinese XI because of rioting in Hong Kong and a second match with Israel due to escalation of what became the Arab-Israeli Six-Day War.

- Squad:

- Alan Anderson (Heart of Midlothian)
- Willie Callaghan (Dunfermline Athletic)
- Eddie Colquhoun (West Bromwich Albion)
- Jim Cruickshank (Heart of Midlothian)
- Alex Ferguson (Dunfermline Athletic)
- Doug Fraser (West Bromwich Albion)
- Joe Harper (Huddersfield Town)
- Harry Hood (Clyde)
- Bobby Hope (West Bromwich Albion)
- Jim McCalliog (Sheffield Wednesday)
- Jackie McGrory (Kilmarnock)
- Tommy McLean (Kilmarnock)
- Willie Morgan (Burnley)
- Andy Penman (Rangers)
- Harry Thomson (Burnley)
- Hugh Tinney (Bury)
- Jim Townsend (St Johnstone)
- Ian Ure (Arsenal)
- John Woodward (Arsenal)

- Nine matches were played during the tour, all of which were won. Following a reassessment by the SFA, five of the games are now classified as full internationals. Details of the other four matches are given below:

25 May 1967 Friendly match	Hong Kong	1–4	Scotland	Hong Kong Island
	Wills 8'	Report 1 Report 2	Ferguson 26', 32'; Hood 59'; W. Callaghan 81'	Stadium: Hong Kong Stadium; Attendance: 7,000

5 June 1967 Friendly match	New Zealand Under-23s	2–7	Scotland	Wellington
	Burgess 10'; Thomas 88'	Report 1 Report 2	McLean 11' (pen.); Harper 35', 78', 89'; McCalliog 60', 70'; Lake 80' (o.g.)	Stadium: Hutt Recreation Ground; Attendance: 5,000; Referee: A. Williams

8 June 1967 Friendly match	Auckland XI	0–4	Scotland	Auckland
			Ferguson 27', 33', 40'; Penman 74'	Stadium: Newmarket Park; Attendance: 15,000; Referee: R. McDonald

10 June 1967 Friendly match	Vancouver All-Stars	1–4	Scotland	Vancouver
	Hazeldine (??)		McCalliog 8' (??); Ferguson 13'; McLean 44' (pen.)	Stadium: Empire Stadium; Attendance: 4,379; Referee: J. Morris

==== 1971 ====
27 January 1971 Friendly (Note: Fundraising match for those affected by the 1971 Ibrox disaster. Also served as a warm-up for a Euro 72 qualifying match a week later. The 'Celtic/Rangers Select' also featured guest players George Best, Peter Bonetti, and Bobby Charlton, while Scotland selected two Rangers players and three from Celtic.)	Scotland	2–1	Celtic/Rangers Select	Glasgow
20:00	Gemmill 10'; Lorimer 84'	Report	Best 29'	Stadium: Hampden Park; Attendance: 81,405; Referee: W. Anderson

==== 1972 ====
- Partick Thistle went on a tour of Southeast Asia in summer 1972, including matches against Selangor FA, an Indonesian XI and Lokomotiv Plovdiv of Bulgaria, which were falsely promoted as 'Scotland vs Malaysia / Indonesia / Bulgaria' by the local organisers to attract spectators, and large crowds did attend.

==== 1976 ====
22 March 1976 Testimonial (Note: Benefit match for Fulham and Tottenham player Alan Mullery. Due to call-offs, Scotland's squad included two Italian players and two English internationals (Terry Cooper and Norman Hunter).)	Great Britain XI	3–2	Scotland	London
	Perryman; Greaves; Ball		Hunter; Lorimer	Stadium: Craven Cottage

==== 1977 ====
22 November 1977 Testimonial (Note: Benefit match for Coventry City player Mick Coop. Scotland's squad was largely players with Coventry connections.)	Coventry City	7–5	Scotland	Coventry
	Cross; Channon; Powell; Yorath		McDonald; Stein; Wallace; Johnston	Stadium: Highfield Road; Attendance: 7,833

==== 1978 ====
16 April 1978 Testimonial (Note: Benefit match for Rangers and Scotland player John Greig, also serving as a warm-up game for the upcoming 1978 FIFA World Cup; Scotland's squad was the World Cup pool.)	Rangers	5–0	Scotland	Glasgow
	Johnstone 1'; Greig 60', 80'; Russell 63', 74'			Stadium: Ibrox Park; Attendance: 65,000; Referee: I. Foote

19 April 1978 Friendly (Note: Warm-up game for the upcoming 1978 FIFA World Cup; Scotland's squad was the World Cup pool.)	Highland League XI	2–2	Scotland	Inverness
	Urquhart 43'; Mackintosh 65'	Report	Sneddon 78'; Cramond 90'	Stadium: Kingsmills Park; Attendance: 4,301; Referee: W. P. Knowles

9 May 1978 Testimonial (Note: Benefit match for Middlesbrough player Willie Maddren, also serving as a warm-up game for the upcoming 1978 FIFA World Cup; Scotland's squad was the World Cup pool.)	Middlesbrough	5–5	Scotland	Middlesbrough
	Ashcroft; Cummins; Armstrong			Stadium: Ayresome Park

=== 1980s–present ===
==== 1982 ====
9 May 1982 Testimonial (Note: Testimonial for Partick Thistle and Scotland player Alan Rough.)	Scotland	3–8	Celtic	Glasgow
	K. Burns 27'; Brazil 69'; Park 75'	Report	McAdam 8' 72'; Crainie 14'; Provan 25' 65'; MacLeod 39'; Garner 44'; Halpin 80'	Stadium: Firhill Stadium; Attendance: 14,000; Referee: A. Ferguson

9 June 1982 Friendly (Note: Warm-up match ahead of the 1982 FIFA World Cup.)	G.D. Torralta	1–9	Scotland	Portimão
	Sergio		Souness 5'; Evans 12'; Archibald 20' 46'; Dalglish 63'; Sturrock	Stadium: Estádio Municipal

10 June 1982 Friendly	G.D. Torralta	0–7	Scotland	Portimão
	Sergio		Brazil; Jordan 75'; Robertson 55' (pen.) 72'; Hartford 66'	Stadium: Estádio Municipal

==== 1986 ====
- A benefit match for former Scotland captain George Young was played in May 1986 between 'Young's XI' which contained several current internationals and wore the Scotland kit, and 'Don Revie's XI' which wore the England kit.

30 May 1986 Friendly (Note: Warm-up match ahead of the 1986 FIFA World Cup.)	Los Angeles Heat	0–3	Scotland	Los Angeles
			Nicholas; Strachan; Nicol

1 June 1986 Friendly	Hollywood Kickers	0–4	Scotland	Los Angeles
			Bannon; Sharp; McAvennie; McStay

==== 1990 ====
18 August 1990 Friendly (Note: Match to commemorate the centenary of the Scottish Football League.)	Scotland	0–1	Scottish League XI	Glasgow
			Gillhaus 12' (pen.)	Stadium: Hampden Park; Attendance: 15,085; Referee: J. McCluskey

==== 1996 ====
No caps were awarded to Scottish players who were on the field for the scheduled match against Estonia during 1998 FIFA World Cup qualification on 9 October 1996, when a scheduling dispute over floodlights led to Scotland turning up at an earlier time and kicking off against no opposition, while Estonia insisted on adhering to the original later time. All records for this fixture relate to the rearranged match played in Monaco on 11 February 1997.

==== 2002 ====
30 April 2002 Friendly (Note: Squad examination played behind closed doors (no paying spectators).)	Scotland	2–0	Dundee United	Stirling
	Dalglish; Dobie			Stadium: Forthbank Stadium; Attendance: 0

- Caps were awarded by the SFA for a match in May 2002 between the Hong Kong League XI and Scotland as part of the HKSAR Reunification Cup, although it was not a full FIFA international.

==== 2004 ====
- A friendly match on 3 September 2004 against Spain in Valencia was abandoned on 59 minutes due to floodlight failure; however caps were awarded and FIFA recognise it as a full international.

== See also ==
- Category:England v Scotland representative footballers (1870–1872)
- List of Scotland wartime international footballers
- Scotland national football B team#Results and fixtures
