= England national football team results (unofficial matches) =

- Win Draw Loss

This is a list of the England national football team's results from 1870 to the present day that, for various reasons, are not accorded the status of official International A Matches.

== 1870s ==
5 March 1870 International Friendly	England	1–1	Scotland	London, England
	Baker 89'		Crawford 75'	Stadium: The Oval Cricket Ground

19 November 1870 International Friendly	England	1–0	Scotland	London, England
	Walker 10'			Stadium: The Oval Cricket Ground; Attendance: 650

25 February 1871 International Friendly	England	1–1	Scotland	London, England
	Walker		Nepean 15'	Stadium: The Oval Cricket Ground; Attendance: >500

18 November 1871 International Friendly	England	2–1	Scotland	London, England
	Walker		Tailyour	Stadium: The Oval Cricket Ground

24 February 1872 International Friendly	England	1–0	Scotland	London, England
	Clegg			Stadium: The Oval Cricket Ground

== 1890s ==
19 December 1891 International Friendly	England	6–1	Canada	London, England
	Cotteril; Smith; Henfrey		Warrick	Stadium: The Oval Cricket Ground; Referee: Nicholas Lane Jackson; Assistant referees: Frederick Wall; J A Ellis

The Football Association (FA) instigated a four-game tour of Germany and Austria by a representative England team in November 1899. The England team played a representative German team in Berlin on 23 November 1899, with the German side losing 1–0. Two days later a slightly altered German side lost 10–2. The third and fourth matches were played in Prague and Karlsruhe against a combined Austrian and German side, and England won 6–0 and 7–0. Those games cannot be considered as "official" and are known as "proto-international matches" (Ur-Länderspiele) in Germany because they were organised by a regional federation from Berlin and the German Football Association (DFB) was not founded until 28 January 1900.

23 November 1899 International Friendly	Germany	2–13	England	Berlin, Germany
	Walter Jestram; Bock	Report	Edgar Chadwick; Brown; Geoffrey Wilson; Frederick Forman; Bassett	Attendance: 1,500; Referee: Stanley Taylor
Note: All but one of the German team played for local clubs

24 November 1899 International Friendly	Germany	2–10	England	Berlin, Germany
	Walter Jestram; Bock	Report	Rogers; Frederick Forman; Taylor; Bassett	Attendance: 512; Referee: John D. Cox
Note: A rematch was staged at 10 a.m. on the following day, so that the FA party could catch the afternoon train to Prague. The visitors made two changes and fielded six full internationals, whilst the Germans included six members of the previous day's team.

26 November 1899 International Friendly	Austria	0–8	England	Prague, Austria
		Report	Rogers; Geoffrey Wilson; Bassett; Edgar Chadwick; Brown	Attendance: Unknown; Referee: Unknown
Note: The English visitors beat a team of players mostly made up from Bohemian clubs, with two from Vienna. At the time, Bohemia was part of the Austrian Empire.

28 November 1899 International Friendly	Germany	0–7	England	Berlin, Germany
		Report	Taylor; Edgar Chadwick; Rogers; Brown	Attendance: 3,000; Referee: Walther Bensemann
Note: The FA party travelled to south-western Germany for the final game of the tour and played with six full internationals in the side. Germany fielded five of the team that had lost to them in Berlin, four days earlier

== 1900s ==
25 September 1901 International Friendly (Note: Germany also played a match against England Amateurs on 21 September 1901.)	England	10–0	Germany	Manchester, England
	Bloomer; Wooldridge; Calvey; Wharton			Stadium: Hyde Road; Attendance: 5,500; Referee: J Lewis

5 April 1902 International Friendly (Note: This was scheduled as a full international and was the title decider in the 1901–02 British Home Championship. A capacity crowd was in attendance. During the first half, a new wooden stand collapsed, killing 25 and injuring 500. The match was played to a conclusion to mitigate any further crowd panic, but was not recorded as a full international fixture. The official match was replayed in England a month later.)	Scotland	1–1	England	Glasgow
15:30	Brown 25'	Report 1 Report 2	Settle 44'	Stadium: Ibrox Park; Attendance: 68,114; Referee: J. Torrans

== 1910s ==
29 June 1910 Test Match (Note: Football Association XI tour of South Africa.)	South Africa	0–3	England	Durban
			Hibbert	Attendance: 5,000

23 July 1910 Test Match	South Africa	2–6	England	Johannesburg
	Messer; Hartigan		Fleming; Woodward; Wall; Holley	Attendance: 13,000

30 July 1910 Test Match	South Africa	3–6	England	Cape Town
	Leeming (o.g.); Lincoln; Hartigan		Holley; Woodward; Fleming; Berry	Attendance: 5,000

=== World War I ===
13 May 1916 International Friendly (Note: Fundraising benefit match for the Lord Mayor of Liverpool's War Scroll Fund.)	England	4–3	Scotland	Liverpool
	Smith 7'; Hampton 20'; Abrams 41'; Mosscrop 84'	Report	Scott 40'; J. Reid 46' (penalty missed); James Galt 52'	Stadium: Goodison Park; Attendance: 22,000

8 June 1918 International Friendly (Note: Fundraising benefit match for the Sir Douglas Haig Base Hospitals. Jimmy McMullan, a Scot, played for England after squad members had to pull out at short notice.)	Scotland	2–0	England	Glasgow
	Archibald; McLean			Stadium: Celtic Park; Attendance: 45,000

12 October 1918 International Friendly (Note: Fundraising benefit match for the Prisoners of War Fund and the Ulster Volunteer Force Hospital. Newcastle United's Bill McCracken, an Irishman, helped to organise the event and was a guest player for England.)	Ireland	0–0	England	Belfast
		Report		Stadium: Windsor Park; Attendance: 20,000

26 April 1919 Victory International	England	2–2	Scotland	Liverpool
	Turnbull; Puddefoot 75'	Report 1 Report 2	Wright 2'; Bowie	Stadium: Goodison Park; Attendance: 45,000; Referee: A. Warner

3 May 1919 Victory International	Scotland	3–4	England	Glasgow
	Wilson 50' (pen.) 87'; Alan Morton 65'	Report 1 Report 2	Grimsdell 20' 35'; Puddefoot 37' 67'	Stadium: Hampden Park; Attendance: 80,000; Referee: A.A. Jackson

11 October 1919 Victory International	Wales	2–1	England	Cardiff, Wales
	Meredith 22'; Wynn 85'	Report	Puddefoot 77'	Stadium: Ninian Park; Attendance: 20,000

18 October 1919 Victory International	England	2–0	Wales	Stoke-on-Trent, England
	Whittingham 6'; Smith 54'	Report		Stadium: Victoria Ground; Attendance: 16,000

== 1920s ==
19 June 1920 Test Match (Note: Football Association XI tour of South Africa.)	South Africa	1–3	England	Durban
	Fitchat		Turnbull 2; Joe Smith	Attendance: 16,000

26 June 1920 Test Match	South Africa	0–3	England	Johannesburg
			Fazackerley 2; Woodcock	Stadium: Wanderers; Attendance: 19,000; Referee: E G Williams

17 July 1920 Test Match	South Africa	1–9	England	Cape Town
	Mason		Fazackerley 4; Joe Smith 2; Mercer; Turnbull; Bamber	Stadium: Hartleyvale Stadium; Attendance: 13,000; Referee: Tarbottom

27 June 1925 Test Match (Note: Football Association XI tour of Australia.)	Australia	1–5	England	Brisbane
	Bourke		Batten 2; Simms 3	Stadium: Exhibition Ground; Referee: W Donnellan

4 July 1925 Test Match	Australia	1–2	England	Sydney
	Smith		Simms; Elkes	Stadium: Sydney Showground; Attendance: 25,000; Referee: W Wright

11 July 1925 Test Match	Australia	2–8	England	Maitland
	Lennard; Thompson		Batten 5; Simms 2; Hannaford	Stadium: West Maitland Showground; Attendance: 10,000

18 July 1925 Test Match	Australia	0–5	England	Sydney
			Simms 2; Batten 2; Elkes	Stadium: Sydney Showground; Attendance: 14,000

25 July 1925 Test Match	Australia	0–2	England	Melbourne
			Charlton; Batten	Stadium: Fitzroy Cricket Ground; Referee: W Palmer

15 July 1926 Test Match (Note: Football Association XI tour of Canada.)	Eastern Canada	1–2	England	Montreal
	D Eadie		Smith; Cross	Attendance: 7,000; Referee: H S Lyons

15 June 1929 Test Match (Note: Football Association XI tour of South Africa and Rhodesia.)	South Africa	2–3	England	Durban
	Dick; Stuart		Chandler 2; Hart	Stadium: Kingsmead Stadium; Attendance: 15,000; Referee: P Miller

13 July 1929 Test Match	South Africa	1–2	England	Johannesburg
	Dick		Chandler 2	Stadium: Wanderers; Attendance: 30,000

17 July 1929 Test Match	South Africa	1–3	England	Cape Town
	Stuart		Hall (og); Chandler 2

== 1930s ==
12 March 1930 Trial Match	England	1–6	(England) The Rest	Liverpool, England
	Tunstall		Jack 3; Strange; Marsden; Johnson	Stadium: Anfield; Attendance: 12,000; Referee: W E Rycroft

4 March 1931 Trial Match	England	3–2	(England) The Rest	London, England
	Dean 3		Burgess 2	Stadium: Highbury; Attendance: 14,282; Referee: G T Gould

15 July 1931 Test Match (Note: Football Association XI tour of Canada.)	National Soccer League (Canada)	0–10	England	Montreal
			Cookson 4; Hine 2; Alexander; Smith; Barry 2	Attendance: 2,500

16 March 1932 Trial Match	England	1–4	(England) The Rest	Huddersfield, England
	Bastin		Waring 2; Hulme; Barclay	Stadium: Leeds Road; Attendance: 8,444; Referee: H Bateson

22 March 1933 Trial Match	England	1–5	(England) The Rest	Portsmouth, England
	Bastin		Hulme 2; Hunt 2; Pickering	Stadium: Fratton Park; Attendance: 15,103; Referee: E G Walliker

21 March 1934 Trial Match	England	1–7	(England) The Rest	Sunderland, England
	Willingham		Carter 4; Gurney 2; Brook	Stadium: Roker Park; Attendance: 13,500; Referee: T J Thompson

27 March 1935 Trial Match (Note: Subsequent trial matches were billed as Probables versus Possibles.)	England	2–2	(England) The Rest	West Bromwich, England
	Drake 2		Gurney; Brook	Stadium: The Hawthorns; Attendance: 12,846; Referee: (Note: Trial of 2 referee system.): Dr A W Barton; E J Wood

21 August 1935 International Friendly (Note: King's Silver Jubilee Trust Fund International)	Scotland	4–2	England	Glasgow
	Delaney 8'; Armstrong 30'; Walker 44' (pen.)	Report 1 Report 2	Gurney 82'; Westwood 87'	Stadium: Hampden Park; Attendance: 56,300; Referee: W. Webb

26 October 1938 (Note: 75th Anniversary of the Football Association.) (Note: As it did not take place against a standard national opponent, FIFA no longer considers this match to be valid as a full international; however, the FA still does so.) International Friendly	England	3–0	Rest of Europe	London, England
	Hall 21'; Lawton 28'; Goulden 73'	Report		Stadium: Highbury Stadium; Attendance: 40,185; Referee: A. J. Jewell

17 June 1939 Test Match (Note: Football Association XI tour of South Africa.)	South Africa	0–3	England	Johannesburg
			J W Lewis 2; M Fenton	Stadium: Wanderers; Attendance: 34,000

24 June 1939 Test Match	South Africa	2–8	England	Durban
	Smethurst; Gibb		M Fenton 3; Gibbons 2; J W Lewis; Finch; Beasley	Stadium: Kingsmead Stadium

1 July 1939 Test Match	South Africa	1–2	England	Johannesburg
	Smethurst		Gibbons; Finch	Stadium: Wanderers; Attendance: 17,000; Referee: B T Head

=== World War II ===
11 November 1939 International Friendly	Wales	1–1	England	Cardiff, Wales
				Stadium: Ninian Park; Attendance: 28,000

18 November 1939 International Friendly	Wales	2–3	England	Wrexham, Wales
				Stadium: The Racecourse Ground; Attendance: 17,000

2 December 1939 International Friendly (Note: After two English players were injured in a traffic accident on their way to the match, two players from the local club Newcastle United who had been in the crowd as spectators appeared for England, including Tommy Pearson, a Scot who later also appeared for his native country.)	England	2–1	Scotland	Newcastle-upon-Tyne
	Clifton; Lawton; Carter (penalty missed)	Report 1 Report 2	Dodds	Stadium: St James' Park; Attendance: 15,000; Referee: H. Nattrass

== 1940s ==
13 April 1940 International Friendly	England	0–1	Wales	London, England
				Stadium: Wembley; Attendance: 40,000

11 May 1940 International Friendly	Scotland	1–1	England	Glasgow
	Dougal	Report 1 Report 2	Welsh	Stadium: Hampden Park; Attendance: 75,000; Referee: W. Webb

8 February 1941 International Friendly	England	2–3	Scotland	Newcastle-upon-Tyne
	Birkett 7'; Lawton 41'	Report 1 Report 2	Bacuzzi , 17' (o.g.); Wallace 45' 67'	Stadium: St James' Park; Attendance: 25,000; Referee: T. Thompson

16 or 26 April 1941 International Friendly	England	4–1	Wales	Nottingham, England
				Stadium: City Ground; Attendance: 13,000

3 May 1941 International Friendly	Scotland	1–3	England	Glasgow
	Venters 10'	Report 1 Report 2	Welsh 44' 87'; Goulden	Stadium: Hampden Park; Attendance: 78,000; Referee: P. Craigmyle

7 June 1941 International Friendly	Wales	2–3	England	Cardiff, Wales
				Stadium: Ninian Park; Attendance: 20,000

4 October 1941 International Friendly	England	2–0	Scotland	London
	Welsh; Hagan	Report 1 Report 2		Stadium: Wembley; Attendance: 65,000; Referee: F.S. Milner

25 October 1941 International Friendly	England	2–1	Wales	Birmingham, England
				Stadium: St Andrew's; Attendance: 25,000

17 January 1942 International Friendly	England	3–0	Scotland	London
	Lawton; Hagan	Report 1 Report 2		Stadium: Wembley; Attendance: 64,000; Referee: W.E. Ross Gower

18 April 1942 International Friendly	Scotland	5–4	England	Glasgow
	Liddell; Dodds; Shankly	https://www.londonhearts.com/scotlandunoff/games/19420418.html Report 1] Report 2	Lawton; Hagan	Stadium: Hampden Park; Attendance: 91,000; Referee: R. Calder

9 May 1942 International Friendly	Wales	1–0	England	Cardiff, Wales
				Stadium: Ninian Park; Attendance: 30,000

10 October 1942 International Friendly	England	0–0	Scotland	London
		https://www.londonhearts.com/scotlandunoff/games/19421010.html Report 1] Report 2		Stadium: Wembley; Attendance: 75,000; Referee: P. Stevens

24 October 1942 International Friendly	England	1–2	Wales	Wolverhampton, England
				Stadium: Molineux; Attendance: 25,100

27 February 1943 International Friendly	England	5–3	Wales	London, England
				Stadium: Wembley; Attendance: 75,000

17 April 1943 International Friendly	Scotland	0–4	England	Glasgow
		Report 1 Report 2	Carter 3' 10'; Westcott; D. Compton	Stadium: Hampden Park; Attendance: 137,363; Referee: P. Craigmyle

8 May 1943 International Friendly	Wales	1–1	England	Cardiff, Wales
				Stadium: Ninian Park; Attendance: 25,000

25 September 1943 International Friendly	England	8–3	Wales	London, England
				Stadium: Wembley; Attendance: 80,000

16 October 1943 International Friendly	England	8–0	Scotland	Manchester
	Lawton; Carter; Hagan; Matthews	Report 1 Report 2		Stadium: Maine Road; Attendance: 60,000

19 February 1944 International Friendly	England	6–2	Scotland	London
	Hagan 37'; Dodds 38'; Macauley 48' (o.g.); Lawton; Carter; Mercer	Report 1; Report 2		Stadium: Wembley; Attendance: 80,000

22 April 1944 International Friendly	Scotland	2–3	England	Glasgow
	Caskie 19'; Dodds 66'	Report 1 Report 2	Lawton 22' 34'; Carter 37'	Stadium: Hampden Park; Attendance: 132,835

6 May 1944 International Friendly	Wales	0–2	England	Cardiff, Wales
				Stadium: Ninian Park; Attendance: 50,000

16 September 1944 International Friendly	England	2–2	Wales	Liverpool, England
				Stadium: Anfield; Attendance: 38,500

14 October 1944 International Friendly	England	6–2	Scotland	London
	Lawton 56'; Carter 37'; Goulden; L. Smith	Report 1 Report 2	Milne 3'; Walker	Stadium: Wembley; Attendance: 90,000; Referee: G. Reader

3 February 1945 International Friendly	England	3–2	Scotland	Birmingham
	Brown; Mortensen	Report 1 Report 2	Delaney; Dodds	Stadium: Villa Park; Attendance: 65,800; Referee: T. Smith

14 April 1945 International Friendly	Scotland	1–6	England	Glasgow
	L. Johnston 38'	Report 1 Report 2	Carter 29'; Lawton; Brown; L. Smith (pen.)	Stadium: Hampden Park; Attendance: 134,479; Referee: J.S. Cox

5 May 1945 International Friendly	Wales	2–3	England	Cardiff, Wales
				Stadium: Ninian Park; Attendance: 25,000

26 May 1945 International Friendly	England	2–2	France	London, England
				Stadium: Wembley; Attendance: 60,000 or 65,000

21 July 1945 International Friendly (Note: Swiss Football Association 50th anniversary.)	Switzerland	3–1	England (Note: Originally considered to be an official England team. Later downgraded to Services XI.)	Bern, Switzerland
				Stadium: Stadion Neufeld; Attendance: 35,000

21 July 1945 International Friendly	Switzerland B	0–3	England	Zürich, Switzerland
				Stadium: Hardturm

15 September 1945 BVHC	Ireland	0–1	England	Belfast, Northern Ireland
				Stadium: Windsor Park; Attendance: 45,100

20 October 1945 BVHC	England	0–1	Wales	West Bromwich, England
				Stadium: The Hawthorns; Attendance: 54,600 or 56,000

19 January 1946 Victory International	England	2–0	Belgium	London, England
				Stadium: Wembley; Attendance: 85,000

13 April 1946 BVHC	Scotland	1–0	England	Glasgow
	Delaney 90'	Report 1 Report 2		Stadium: Hampden Park; Attendance: 139,642; Referee: P. Craigmyle

11 May 1946 Victory International	England	4–1	Switzerland	London, England
				Stadium: Stamford Bridge; Attendance: 75,000

19 May 1946 Victory International	France	2–1	England	Paris, France
				Stadium: Stade Olympique de Colombes; Attendance: 58,500

24 August 1946 International Friendly (Note: Fundraising match for the Burnden Park disaster.)	England	2–2	Scotland	Manchester
	Welsh (pen.), 45'	Report 1 Report 2	Thornton 89'	Stadium: Maine Road; Attendance: 70,000; Referee: G. Dutton

== 1950s ==
19 June 1950 Test Match (Note: Football Association XI tour of Canada and United States.)	United States	0–1	England	New York
			Hancocks	Stadium: Triborough Stadium; Attendance: 8,241

20 September 1950 1950 FA Charity Shield (Note: Instead of being contested between the Football League champions and FA Cup winners, the 1950 Charity Shield was an exhibition match between the England squad of the 1950 FIFA World Cup and the FA representative team that concurrently toured Canada.)	England	4–2	England B / FA XI	London, England
	Manion; Mortensen; Baily; Mullen		Johnston; Lofthouse	Stadium: Stamford Bridge; Attendance: 38,468

9 May 1951 Test Match (Note: Football Association XI tour of United States and Australia.)	American Soccer League (United States)	0–4	England	New York
			Smith 2; Shaw; Langton	Stadium: Croke Park; Attendance: 2,500

16 May 1951 Tour Match	South Coast	0–7	England	Wollongong, New South Wales

16 May 1951 Tour Match	New South Wales	1–8	England	Sydney, New South Wales
				Stadium: Sydney Cricket Ground

16 May 1951 Tour Match	Sydney	2–6	England	Sydney, New South Wales
				Stadium: Sydney Cricket Ground

26 May 1951 Test Match	Australia	1–4	England	Sydney
	Parsons		Sewell 2; Clarke; Hurst	Stadium: Sydney Cricket Ground; Attendance: 46,000; Referee: Wright

30 May 1951 Tour Match	Northern Districts	1–7	England	Cessnock, New South Wales

2 June 1951 Tour Match	New South Wales	1–3	England	Newcastle, New South Wales
				Stadium: Newcastle Showground

6 June 1951 Tour Match	Victoria (Victoria (state))	0–5	England	Melbourne, Victoria
			Hagan; Smith (2); Broome; Langton	Stadium: Melbourne Cricket Ground; Attendance: 12,437

9 June 1951 Tour Match	Victoria (Victoria (state))	0–7	England	Melbourne, Victoria
				Stadium: Melbourne Cricket Ground

26 May 1951 Friendly	Australia	1–4	England	Sydney, Australia
	Parsons 42'	Report	Sewell 3', 15'; I. Clarke 23'; Hurst (?)	Stadium: Sydney Cricket Ground; Attendance: 46,104; Referee: Ron Wright (Australia)

16 June 1951 Tour Match	Tasmania	0–11	England	Hobart, Tasmania
		Report	Hurst 4; Webster 2; Broome 2; Clarke; Hagan; Parker	Stadium: North Hobart Oval; Attendance: 4,800; Referee: G. Evans

19 June 1951 Tour Match	Tasmania	0–17	England	Launceston, Tasmania
		Report	Hagan 8; Sewell 4; Langton 2; Webster 2; Broome	Stadium: York Park; Attendance: 2,500

23 June 1951 Friendly	Australia	1–13	England	Adelaide, South Australia
	R MacKenzie	Report	Sewell 4; Hagan 3; Clarke 3; Broome 2; Langton	Stadium: Adelaide Oval; Attendance: 13,895; Referee: Joe Harvey

30 June 1951 Test Match	Australia	0–17	England	Sydney, New South Wales
			Clarke 4; Sewell 6; Hagan 3; Broome 3; Hurst	Stadium: Sydney Cricket Ground; Attendance: 14,417; Referee: H. McLeod

4 July 1951 Tour Match	Queensland	1–7	England	Brisbane, Queensland
				Stadium: Brisbane Cricket Ground

7 July 1951 Test Match	Australia	1–4	England	Brisbane, Queensland
	H Robertson		Clarke 2; Hagan; Langton	Stadium: Brisbane Cricket Ground; Attendance: 23, 216; Referee: Perotte

11 July 1951 Tour Match	Central Queensland	1–13	England	Bundaberg, Queensland

14 July 1951 Test Match	Australia	1–6	England	Sydney
	E Hulme		Webster 3; Sewell; Hurst; Clarke	Stadium: Sydney Showground; Attendance: 12,000; Referee: Chidgey

14 July 1951 Tour Match	Granville	2–5	England	Parramatta, New South Wales
	Marshall 2		Bamford 2; Langton; Smith; Hurst	Stadium: Cumberland Oval; Attendance: 5,269; Referee: Jack McKenzie

21 July 1951 Test Match	Australia	0–5	England	Newcastle, New South Wales
			Sewell; Smith; Clarke 2; Hurst

22 July 1951 Tour Match	New South Wales	0–2	England	Wollongong, New South Wales
			Bamford 10'; Sewell	Stadium: Wollongong Showground; Attendance: 4,268; Referee: George Richardson

21 October 1953 Friendly (Note: 90th anniversary of the Football Association.) (Note: As it did not take place against a standard national opponent, FIFA no longer considers this match to be valid as a full international; however, the FA still does so.)	England	4–4	Rest of Europe (Note: The opponent was officially the 'Rest of the World', but in practice all the players were from continental Europe.)	London, England
	Mortensen 7'; Mullen 40' 48'; Ramsay 89'	Report	Kubala 6' 63'; Boniperti 15' 38'	Stadium: Wembley; Attendance: 97,000; Referee: B. M. Griffiths (Wales)

9 May 1955 An Tóstal Festival	All-Ireland (Republic of Ireland) (Northern Ireland)	5–6	England (Note: Included Welsh international Trevor Ford.)	Dublin, Ireland
	McKenna; Gibbons; Doherty; McMorran 2		Rowley; Mitten 2; Ford 3	Stadium: Dalymount Park; Attendance: 25,000; Referee: J Smith

7 May 1956 An Tóstal Festival	All-Ireland (Republic of Ireland) (Northern Ireland)	3–5	England	Dublin, Ireland
	Walker; Doherty; Lockhart		Eastham Jr; Sewell 2; Ford 2	Stadium: Dalymount Park; Referee: J Meighan

14 May 1956 (Note: Belgrove F.C. exhibition match.)	Ireland-Wales (Republic of Ireland)	3–3	England-Scotland	Dublin, Ireland
	J P Dunne; Allchurch 2		Thompson; Langton; Allen	Stadium: Dalymount Park; Referee: J Scully

23 June 1956 Test Match (Note: Football Association XI tour of South Africa and Rhodesia.)	South Africa	3–4	England	Johannesburg
	C Hurly 2; L Salton		Harris; King; Robson; Perry	Stadium: Rand Stadium; Attendance: 28,000; Referee: J Speedie

30 June 1956 Test Match	South Africa	2–4	England	Durban
	D Le Roux; B K Gibson		Harris 2; Robson; Hitchens	Stadium: Kingsmead Stadium; Attendance: 23,000; Referee: J Fitzgerald

9 July 1956 Test Match	South Africa	0–0	England	Cape Town
				Stadium: Hartleyvale Stadium; Attendance: 12,500

14 July 1956 Test Match	South Africa	1–4	England	Salisbury
	C Hurly		Hitchens 2; McGarry; Ayre	Stadium: Police Ground; Attendance: 15,000

== 1960s ==
13 May 1961 Test Match (Note: Football Association XI tour of Malaysia, Singapore, Hong Kong, New Zealand and United States.)	Malaysia	2–4	England	Kuala Lumpur
	Koh; Choe		Charnley 3; Lindsay	Stadium: Nerdera Stadium; Attendance: 20,000; Referee: T Nadarajah

17 May 1961 Test Match	Singapore	0–9	England	Singapore
			Charnley 2; Fantham 2; Hannah 3; A'Court; Finney	Stadium: Jalan Besar Stadium; Attendance: 14,294

17 May 1961 Test Match	Hong Kong	2–4	England	Hong Kong
	Lau Chi-Lam; Yeung Wai		Charnley 2; Moore; Hannah	Stadium: Government Stadium; Referee: Sammy Tsang

23 May 1961 Test Match	Combined Chinese	0–3	England	Hong Kong
			Charnley; Fantham; Hannah	Stadium: Government Stadium; Attendance: 20,000; Referee: I Petrie

5 June 1961 Test Match	New Zealand	0–8	England	Wellington
			Finney; Lewis; Charnley 2; Fantham 3; Middleton (og)	Stadium: Basin Reserve; Referee: Dickie

10 June 1961 Test Match	New Zealand	1–6	England	Auckland
	McVey		Finney 2; A'Court; Lewis; Fantham; Charnley	Stadium: Epsom Showgrounds; Referee: Williams

12 August 1961 1961 FA Charity Shield	Tottenham Hotspur F.C. (England)	3–2	England (Note: Team billed as F.A. XI, assembled to take the berth vacated by Tottenham Hotspur's Football League and FA Cup Double.)	London, England
	Smith; Allen,		Haynes; Byrne	Stadium: White Hart Lane; Attendance: 36,593

23 May 1963 Friendly (Note: Part of the Football Association's centenary celebrations.)	England	3–3	(England) Football League XI	London, England
	Greaves 21' (pen.); Hinton 30'; Byrne 47'	Report 1; Report 2	Hunt 24'; Hurst 31'; Kay 62'	Stadium: Highbury Stadium; Attendance: 26,994; Referee: A. E. Moore

23 October 1963 International friendly	England	2–1	Rest of World (Note: As it did not take place against a standard national opponent, FIFA no longer considers this match to be valid as a full international; however, the FA still does so.)	London, England
14:45; Match 373	Paine 65'; Greaves 90'	Report	Law 82'	Stadium: Wembley; Attendance: 48,350; Referee: Bobby Davidson (Scotland)

21 May 1969 Test Match (Note: Football Association XI tour of Tahiti, New Zealand, Singapore, Hong Kong and Thailand.)	Tahiti	1–4	England	Papeete
	unknown		Hateley 3; Knighton	Attendance: 4,000

2 June 1969 Test Match	New Zealand	1–7	England	Wellington
	Mears		Hateley 4; Rioch; Weller; Piper	Stadium: Basin Reserve; Attendance: 6,000

4 June 1969 Friendly	Mexico	0–4	England	Guadalajara, Mexico
			Clarke 2; Astle 2	Stadium: Jalisco Stadium; Attendance: 45,000; Referee: A Tejada (Peru)

7 June 1969 Test Match	New Zealand Squad XI	0–5	England	Hamilton, New Zealand
			Eastham 3; Hateley; Weller	Attendance: 6,000; Referee: R Rump

11 June 1969 Test Match	New Zealand	0–5	England	Auckland
			Weller 2; Hateley 3	Stadium: Newmarket Park; Attendance: 5,000; Referee: Coffman

14 June 1969 Test Match	Singapore	0–9	England	Singapore
			Hateley 4; Weller 2; Piper 2; Eastham	Stadium: Jalan Besar Stadium; Attendance: 8,000; Referee: G Suppiah

16 June 1969 Test Match	Hong Kong	0–6	England	Hong Kong
			Hateley; Morgan 2; Eddy; Piper 2	Stadium: Happy Valley Stadium; Attendance: 20,647; Referee: Fred Pratlett

20 June 1969 Test Match	Thailand	0–4	England	Bangkok
			Hateley; Weller 2; Piper	Attendance: 40,000

== 1970s ==
24 May 1971 Exhibition Match (Note: Golden Jubilee match for the Football Association of Ireland.)	Republic of Ireland	1–1	England	Dublin
	Heighway		Wagstaff	Stadium: Lansdowne Road; Attendance: 8,000

1976 Exhibition Match	England	8–0	(England) Uxbridge F.C.	London, England
				Stadium: Wembley Stadium

31 May 1976 1976 U.S.A. Bicentennial Cup Tournament	Team America (United States)	1–3	England	Philadelphia, United States
	Scullion 87'		Keegan 23' 29'; Francis 54'	Stadium: John F. Kennedy Stadium; Attendance: 16,200

== 1980s ==
13 October 1981 Friendly (Note: Centenary commemoration match for the London Football Association.)	London XI	3–4	England	London
	Roeder; Davies; Bonds	Report	Goddard; Morley; Keegan; McDermott	Stadium: Highbury; Attendance: 5,007

23 March 1982 Testimonial (Note: Testimonial for retiring Athletic Bilbao player Txetxu Rojo. Served as a warm-up for the 1982 FIFA World Cup, as England would play their opening round matches at the same venue.)	Athletic Bilbao (Spain)	1–1	England	Bilbao
20:00	Sarabia 67'		Keegan 37'	Stadium: San Mamés; Attendance: 40,000; Referee: I. Urizar Azpitarte

14 May 1986 International Friendly	South Korea	1–4	England	Colorado Springs, United States
	Kang Deuk-soo 81'	News Paper	Mark Hateley 37'	Stadium: Fountain Valley School of Colorado (?)

28 May 1986 Exhibition Match	C.F. Monterrey (Mexico)	1–4	England	Monterrey, Mexico ?
				Stadium: Estadio Tecnológico ?

14 Dec 1986 Exhibition Match	Bradford City F.C. (England)	2–1	England	Bradford, England
				Stadium: Valley Parade

4 June 1988 Exhibition Match	Aylesbury United F.C. (England)	0–7	England	Aylesbury, England
				Stadium: Buckingham Road Stadium; Attendance: 6,000

== 1990s ==
1995

- The friendly match between England and the Republic of Ireland on 15 February 1995 in Dublin had to be abandoned after 27 minutes due to missile throwing and riotous disorder among extremist elements in the England support; caps were still awarded to the players and the match (along with David Kelly's goal for Ireland) is counted as a full international; it was never replayed.

1996

26 May 1996 Exhibition Match	Hong Kong Golden XI	0–1	England	Wan Chai, Hong Kong
		Report	Ferdinand 35'	Stadium: Hong Kong Stadium; Attendance: 26,000

1998

9 June 1998 Exhibition Match	Caen XI (France)	0–1	England	Caen, France
			Scholes 84'	Stadium: Stade Michel d'Ornano; Attendance: 200

== 2010s ==
7 June 2010 Exhibition Match	Platinum Stars (South Africa)	0–3	England	Moruleng, South Africa
			Defoe; J. Cole; Rooney	Stadium: Moruleng Stadium; Attendance: 12,000

== 2020s ==
2026

11 June 2026 Training match	Miami United FC (United States)	0–6	England	Palm Beach Gardens, Florida, United States (BCD)
			Toney; Henderson; Nwaneri; Ngumoha	Attendance: 0
Note: The match was composed of two 25-minute periods followed by an impromptu penalty shootout.

18 June 2026 Training match	Sporting Kansas City (United States)	1–5	England	Kansas City, Missouri, United States (BCD)
	Goal		Toney; Watkins; Rogers	Stadium: Swope Soccer Village; Attendance: 0
Note: The match was composed of two 25-minute periods.

== See also ==
- Category:England v Scotland representative footballers (1870–1872)
- Category:England men's wartime international footballers
