= List of England national football team World Cup and European Championship squads =

The World Cup and European Championship, are the primary competitive tournaments the England national football team enters. The finals of both tournaments held every four years in alternate even numbered years. Excluding the tournament years in which England either did not enter or failed to qualify for the finals, the England national team has nominated the following squads of players to compete in the finals:

== 1950 World Cup ==
- Progress: Group stage

Head coach: Walter Winterbottom

No.	Pos.	Player	Date of birth (age)	Caps	Club
–	DF	John Aston	2 September 1921 (aged 28)	14	(England) Manchester United
–	MF	Eddie Baily	6 August 1925 (aged 24)	0	(England) Tottenham Hotspur
–	FW	Roy Bentley	17 May 1924 (aged 26)	4	(England) Chelsea
–	MF	Henry Cockburn	14 September 1921 (aged 28)	10	(England) Manchester United
–	MF	Jimmy Dickinson	24 April 1925 (aged 25)	7	(England) Portsmouth
–	GK	Ted Ditchburn	24 October 1921 (aged 28)	2	(England) Tottenham Hotspur
–	DF	Bill Eckersley	16 July 1925 (aged 24)	0	(England) Blackburn Rovers
–	FW	Tom Finney	5 April 1922 (aged 28)	25	(England) Preston North End
–	MF	Laurie Hughes	2 March 1924 (aged 26)	0	(England) Liverpool
–	FW	Wilf Mannion	16 May 1918 (aged 32)	19	(England) Middlesbrough
–	FW	Stanley Matthews	1 February 1915 (aged 35)	30	(England) Blackpool
–	FW	Jackie Milburn	11 May 1924 (aged 26)	7	(England) Newcastle United
–	FW	Stan Mortensen	26 May 1921 (aged 29)	18	(England) Blackpool
–	FW	Jimmy Mullen	6 January 1923 (aged 27)	4	(England) Wolverhampton Wanderers
–	MF	Bill Nicholson	26 January 1919 (aged 31)	0	(England) Tottenham Hotspur
–	DF	Alf Ramsey	22 January 1920 (aged 30)	5	(England) Tottenham Hotspur
–	DF	Laurie Scott	23 April 1917 (aged 33)	17	(England) Arsenal
–	DF	Jim Taylor	5 November 1917 (aged 32)	0	(England) Fulham
–	MF	Willie Watson	7 March 1920 (aged 30)	2	(England) Sunderland
–	GK	Bert Williams	31 January 1920 (aged 30)	7	(England) Wolverhampton Wanderers
–	DF	Billy Wright (captain)	6 February 1924 (aged 26)	29	(England) Wolverhampton Wanderers

== 1954 World Cup ==
- Progress: Quarter-finals

Head coach: Walter Winterbottom

No.	Pos.	Player	Date of birth (age)	Caps	Club
1	GK	Gil Merrick	26 January 1922 (aged 32)	20	(England) Birmingham City
2	DF	Ron Staniforth	13 April 1924 (aged 30)	3	(England) Huddersfield Town
3	DF	Roger Byrne	8 February 1929 (aged 25)	3	(England) Manchester United
4	DF	Billy Wright (captain)	6 February 1924 (aged 30)	58	(England) Wolverhampton Wanderers
5	MF	Syd Owen	28 February 1922 (aged 32)	2	(England) Luton Town
6	MF	Jimmy Dickinson	24 April 1925 (aged 29)	35	(England) Portsmouth
7	FW	Stanley Matthews	1 February 1915 (aged 39)	36	(England) Blackpool
8	FW	Ivor Broadis	18 December 1922 (aged 31)	11	(England) Newcastle United
9	FW	Nat Lofthouse	27 August 1925 (aged 28)	19	(England) Bolton Wanderers
10	FW	Tommy Taylor	29 January 1932 (aged 22)	3	(England) Manchester United
11	FW	Tom Finney	5 April 1922 (aged 32)	51	(England) Preston North End
12	GK	Ted Burgin	29 April 1927 (aged 27)	0	(England) Sheffield United
13	DF	Ken Green	27 April 1924 (aged 30)	0	(England) Birmingham City
14	MF	Bill McGarry	10 June 1927 (aged 27)	0	(England) Huddersfield Town
15	FW	Dennis Wilshaw	11 March 1926 (aged 28)	1	(England) Wolverhampton Wanderers
16	MF	Albert Quixall	9 August 1933 (aged 20)	3	(England) Sheffield Wednesday
17	FW	Jimmy Mullen	6 January 1923 (aged 31)	11	(England) Wolverhampton Wanderers
18	DF	Allenby Chilton*	16 September 1918 (aged 35)	2	(England) Manchester United
19	MF	Ken Armstrong*	3 June 1924 (aged 30)	0	(England) Chelsea
20	MF	Bedford Jezzard*	19 October 1927 (aged 26)	1	(England) Fulham
21	MF	Johnny Haynes*	17 October 1934 (aged 19)	0	(England) Fulham
22	FW	Harry Hooper*	14 June 1933 (aged 21)	0	(England) West Ham United

- Only 17 of the 22 official squad members actually travelled to Switzerland for the 1954 tournament. Five players—Ken Armstrong, Allenby Chilton, Johnny Haynes, Harry Hooper and Bedford Jezzard—were put on reserve status and remained at home awaiting a call if the need arose. It did not.

== 1958 World Cup ==
- Progress: Group stage

Head coach: Walter Winterbottom

No.	Pos.	Player	Date of birth (age)	Caps	Club
1	GK	Colin McDonald	15 October 1930 (aged 27)	1	(England) Burnley
2	DF	Don Howe	12 October 1935 (aged 22)	7	(England) West Bromwich Albion
3	DF	Tommy Banks	10 November 1929 (aged 28)	1	(England) Bolton Wanderers
4	DF	Eddie Clamp	14 September 1934 (aged 23)	1	(England) Wolverhampton Wanderers
5	MF	Billy Wright (captain)	6 February 1924 (aged 34)	92	(England) Wolverhampton Wanderers
6	MF	Bill Slater	29 April 1927 (aged 31)	6	(England) Wolverhampton Wanderers
7	FW	Bryan Douglas	27 May 1934 (aged 24)	7	(England) Blackburn Rovers
8	FW	Bobby Robson	18 February 1933 (aged 25)	2	(England) West Bromwich Albion
9	FW	Derek Kevan	6 March 1935 (aged 23)	7	(England) West Bromwich Albion
10	FW	Johnny Haynes	17 October 1934 (aged 23)	20	(England) Fulham
11	FW	Tom Finney	5 April 1922 (aged 36)	73	(England) Preston North End
12	GK	Eddie Hopkinson	29 October 1935 (aged 22)	6	(England) Bolton Wanderers
13	GK	Alan Hodgkinson*	16 August 1936 (aged 21)	4	(England) Sheffield United
14	DF	Peter Sillett	1 February 1933 (aged 25)	3	(England) Chelsea
15	DF	Ronnie Clayton	5 August 1934 (aged 23)	20	(England) Blackburn Rovers
16	DF	Maurice Norman	8 May 1934 (aged 24)	0	(England) Tottenham Hotspur
17	FW	Peter Brabrook	8 November 1937 (aged 20)	0	(England) Chelsea
18	FW	Peter Broadbent	15 May 1933 (aged 25)	0	(England) Wolverhampton Wanderers
19	FW	Bobby Smith	22 February 1933 (aged 25)	0	(England) Tottenham Hotspur
20	FW	Bobby Charlton	11 October 1937 (aged 20)	3	(England) Manchester United
21	FW	Alan A'Court	30 September 1934 (aged 23)	1	(England) Liverpool
22	FW	Maurice Setters*	16 December 1936 (aged 21)	0	(England) West Bromwich Albion

- Some sources state that England took only 20 squad members to the 1958 tournament in Sweden, and their squad lists do not include Alan Hodgkinson or Maurice Setters. Other sources, including FIFA's official World Cup records, list 22 players on the squad and include both Hodgkinson and Setters. The likelihood is that these two players were included on the squad list submitted to FIFA but did not travel to the tournament.

== 1962 World Cup ==
- Progress: Quarter-finals

Head coach: Walter Winterbottom

No.	Pos.	Player	Date of birth (age)	Caps	Club
1	GK	Ron Springett	22 July 1935 (aged 26)	21	(England) Sheffield Wednesday
2	DF	Jimmy Armfield	2 September 1935 (aged 26)	25	(England) Blackpool
3	DF	Ray Wilson	17 December 1934 (aged 27)	11	(England) Huddersfield Town
4	FW	Bobby Robson	18 February 1933 (aged 29)	20	(England) West Bromwich Albion
5	MF	Peter Swan	8 October 1936 (aged 25)	19	(England) Sheffield Wednesday
6	MF	Ron Flowers	28 July 1934 (aged 27)	32	(England) Wolverhampton Wanderers
7	MF	John Connelly	18 July 1938 (aged 23)	8	(England) Burnley
8	FW	Jimmy Greaves	20 February 1940 (aged 22)	18	(England) Tottenham Hotspur
9	FW	Gerry Hitchens	8 October 1934 (aged 27)	5	(Italy) Internazionale
10	FW	Johnny Haynes (captain)	17 October 1934 (aged 27)	52	(England) Fulham
11	FW	Bobby Charlton	11 October 1937 (aged 24)	35	(England) Manchester United
12	GK	Alan Hodgkinson	16 August 1936 (aged 25)	5	(England) Sheffield United
13	FW	Derek Kevan*	6 March 1935 (aged 27)	14	(England) West Bromwich Albion
14	MF	Stan Anderson	27 February 1933 (aged 29)	2	(England) Sunderland
15	DF	Maurice Norman	8 May 1934 (aged 28)	1	(England) Tottenham Hotspur
16	DF	Bobby Moore	12 April 1941 (aged 21)	1	(England) West Ham United
17	MF	Bryan Douglas	27 May 1934 (aged 28)	29	(England) Blackburn Rovers
18	FW	Roger Hunt	20 July 1938 (aged 23)	1	(England) Liverpool
19	FW	Alan Peacock	29 October 1937 (aged 24)	0	(England) Middlesbrough
20	MF	George Eastham	23 September 1936 (aged 25)	0	(England) Arsenal
21	DF	Don Howe	12 October 1935 (aged 26)	23	(England) West Bromwich Albion
22	GK	Gordon Banks*	30 December 1937 (aged 24)	0	(England) Leicester City

- Some sources state that only 20 of the 22 squad members travelled to the 1962 tournament in Chile, that Gordon Banks and Derek Kevan were stay-at-home reserves who were never called.

== 1966 World Cup ==
- Progress: Winners

Head coach: Alf Ramsey

No.	Pos.	Player	Date of birth (age)	Caps	Club
1	GK	Gordon Banks	30 December 1937 (aged 28)	27	(England) Leicester City
2	DF	George Cohen	22 October 1939 (aged 26)	24	(England) Fulham
3	DF	Ray Wilson	17 December 1934 (aged 31)	45	(England) Everton
4	MF	Nobby Stiles	18 May 1942 (aged 24)	14	(England) Manchester United
5	DF	Jack Charlton	8 May 1935 (aged 31)	16	(England) Leeds United
6	DF	Bobby Moore (captain)	12 April 1941 (aged 25)	41	(England) West Ham United
7	MF	Alan Ball	12 May 1945 (aged 21)	10	(England) Blackpool
8	FW	Jimmy Greaves	20 February 1940 (aged 26)	51	(England) Tottenham Hotspur
9	MF	Bobby Charlton	11 October 1937 (aged 28)	68	(England) Manchester United
10	FW	Geoff Hurst	8 December 1941 (aged 24)	4	(England) West Ham United
11	FW	John Connelly	18 July 1938 (aged 27)	19	(England) Manchester United
12	GK	Ron Springett	22 July 1935 (aged 30)	33	(England) Sheffield Wednesday
13	GK	Peter Bonetti	27 September 1941 (aged 24)	1	(England) Chelsea
14	DF	Jimmy Armfield	21 September 1935 (aged 30)	43	(England) Blackpool
15	DF	Gerry Byrne	29 August 1938 (aged 27)	2	(England) Liverpool
16	MF	Martin Peters	8 November 1943 (aged 22)	3	(England) West Ham United
17	DF	Ron Flowers	28 July 1934 (aged 31)	49	(England) Wolverhampton
18	DF	Norman Hunter	24 October 1943 (aged 22)	4	(England) Leeds United
19	FW	Terry Paine	23 March 1939 (aged 27)	18	(England) Southampton
20	MF	Ian Callaghan	10 April 1942 (aged 24)	1	(England) Liverpool
21	FW	Roger Hunt	20 July 1938 (aged 27)	13	(England) Liverpool
22	MF	George Eastham	23 September 1936 (aged 29)	19	(England) Arsenal

== 1968 European Championship ==
- Progress: Third place

Head coach: Alf Ramsey

No.	Pos.	Player	Date of birth (age)	Caps	Club
1	GK	Gordon Banks	30 December 1937 (aged 30)	43	(England) Stoke City
2	DF	Keith Newton	23 June 1941 (aged 26)	9	(England) Blackburn Rovers
3	DF	Ray Wilson	17 December 1934 (aged 33)	61	(England) Everton
4	MF	Alan Mullery	23 November 1941 (aged 26)	10	(England) Tottenham Hotspur
5	DF	Brian Labone	23 January 1940 (aged 28)	9	(England) Everton
6	DF	Bobby Moore (captain)	12 April 1941 (aged 27)	61	(England) West Ham United
7	MF	Alan Ball	12 May 1945 (aged 23)	26	(England) Everton
8	FW	Roger Hunt	20 July 1938 (aged 29)	30	(England) Liverpool
9	MF	Bobby Charlton	11 October 1937 (aged 30)	85	(England) Manchester United
10	FW	Geoff Hurst	8 December 1941 (aged 26)	20	(England) West Ham United
11	MF	Martin Peters	8 November 1943 (aged 24)	19	(England) West Ham United
12	GK	Alex Stepney	18 September 1942 (aged 25)	1	(England) Manchester United
13	GK	Gordon West	24 April 1943 (aged 25)	0	(England) Everton
14	MF	Cyril Knowles	13 July 1944 (aged 23)	4	(England) Tottenham Hotspur
15	DF	Jack Charlton	8 May 1935 (aged 33)	28	(England) Leeds United
16	DF	Tommy Wright	21 October 1944 (aged 23)	0	(England) Everton
17	MF	Nobby Stiles	18 May 1942 (aged 26)	24	(England) Manchester United
18	FW	Mike Summerbee	15 December 1942 (aged 25)	3	(England) Manchester City
19	DF	Norman Hunter	29 October 1943 (aged 24)	8	(England) Leeds United
20	MF	Colin Bell	26 February 1946 (aged 22)	2	(England) Manchester City
21	FW	Jimmy Greaves	20 February 1940 (aged 28)	57	(England) Tottenham Hotspur
22	FW	Peter Thompson	27 November 1942 (aged 25)	14	(England) Liverpool

== 1970 World Cup ==
- Progress: Quarter-finals

Head coach: Alf Ramsey

No.	Pos.	Player	Date of birth (age)	Caps	Club
1	GK	Gordon Banks	30 December 1937 (aged 32)	59	(England) Stoke City
2	DF	Keith Newton	23 June 1941 (aged 28)	24	(England) Everton
3	DF	Terry Cooper	12 July 1944 (aged 25)	8	(England) Leeds United
4	MF	Alan Mullery	23 November 1941 (aged 28)	27	(England) Tottenham Hotspur
5	DF	Brian Labone	23 January 1940 (aged 30)	23	(England) Everton
6	DF	Bobby Moore (captain)	12 April 1941 (aged 29)	80	(England) West Ham United
7	FW	Francis Lee	29 April 1944 (aged 26)	14	(England) Manchester City
8	MF	Alan Ball	12 May 1945 (aged 25)	41	(England) Everton
9	MF	Bobby Charlton	11 October 1937 (aged 32)	102	(England) Manchester United
10	FW	Geoff Hurst	8 December 1941 (aged 28)	38	(England) West Ham United
11	MF	Martin Peters	8 November 1943 (aged 26)	38	(England) Tottenham Hotspur
12	GK	Peter Bonetti	27 September 1941 (aged 28)	6	(England) Chelsea
13	GK	Alex Stepney	18 September 1942 (aged 27)	1	(England) Manchester United
14	DF	Tommy Wright	21 October 1944 (aged 25)	9	(England) Everton
15	DF	Nobby Stiles	18 May 1942 (aged 28)	28	(England) Manchester United
16	MF	Emlyn Hughes	28 August 1947 (aged 22)	6	(England) Liverpool
17	DF	Jack Charlton	8 May 1935 (aged 35)	34	(England) Leeds United
18	DF	Norman Hunter	29 October 1943 (aged 26)	13	(England) Leeds United
19	MF	Colin Bell	26 February 1946 (aged 24)	11	(England) Manchester City
20	FW	Peter Osgood	20 February 1947 (aged 23)	1	(England) Chelsea
21	FW	Allan Clarke	31 July 1946 (aged 23)	0	(England) Leeds United
22	FW	Jeff Astle	13 May 1942 (aged 28)	3	(England) West Bromwich Albion

== 1980 European Championship ==
- Progress: Group stage

Head coach: Ron Greenwood

No.	Pos.	Player	Date of birth (age)	Caps	Club
1	GK	Ray Clemence	5 August 1948 (aged 31)	49	(England) Liverpool
2	DF	Phil Neal	20 February 1951 (aged 29)	25	(England) Liverpool
3	DF	Kenny Sansom	26 September 1958 (aged 21)	7	(England) Crystal Palace
4	DF	Phil Thompson	21 January 1954 (aged 26)	23	(England) Liverpool
5	DF	Dave Watson	5 October 1946 (aged 33)	52	(England) Southampton
6	MF	Ray Wilkins	14 September 1956 (aged 23)	32	(England) Manchester United
7	FW	Kevin Keegan (captain)	14 February 1951 (aged 29)	51	(West Germany) Hamburger SV
8	MF	Steve Coppell	9 July 1955 (aged 24)	23	(England) Manchester United
9	FW	David Johnson	23 October 1951 (aged 28)	7	(England) Liverpool
10	MF	Trevor Brooking	2 October 1948 (aged 31)	37	(England) West Ham United
11	FW	Tony Woodcock	6 December 1955 (aged 24)	10	(West Germany) 1. FC Köln
12	DF	Viv Anderson	29 July 1956 (aged 23)	3	(England) Nottingham Forest
13	GK	Peter Shilton	18 September 1949 (aged 30)	30	(England) Nottingham Forest
14	DF	Trevor Cherry	23 February 1948 (aged 32)	26	(England) Leeds United
15	DF	Emlyn Hughes	28 August 1947 (aged 32)	62	(England) Wolverhampton Wanderers
16	DF	Mick Mills	4 January 1949 (aged 31)	29	(England) Ipswich Town
17	MF	Terry McDermott	8 December 1951 (aged 28)	10	(England) Liverpool
18	MF	Ray Kennedy	28 July 1951 (aged 28)	15	(England) Liverpool
19	MF	Glenn Hoddle	27 October 1957 (aged 22)	3	(England) Tottenham Hotspur
20	FW	Paul Mariner	22 May 1953 (aged 27)	9	(England) Ipswich Town
21	FW	Garry Birtles	27 July 1956 (aged 23)	1	(England) Nottingham Forest
22	GK	Joe Corrigan	18 November 1948 (aged 31)	5	(England) Manchester City

== 1982 World Cup ==
- Progress: Second group stage

Head coach: Ron Greenwood

No.	Pos.	Player	Date of birth (age)	Caps	Club
1	GK	Ray Clemence	5 August 1948 (aged 33)	59	(England) Tottenham Hotspur
2	DF	Viv Anderson	29 August 1956 (aged 25)	10	(England) Nottingham Forest
3	MF	Trevor Brooking	2 October 1948 (aged 33)	46	(England) West Ham United
4	DF	Terry Butcher	28 December 1958 (aged 23)	4	(England) Ipswich Town
5	MF	Steve Coppell	9 July 1955 (aged 26)	36	(England) Manchester United
6	DF	Steve Foster	24 September 1957 (aged 24)	2	(England) Brighton & Hove Albion
7	FW	Kevin Keegan (captain)	14 February 1951 (aged 31)	62	(England) Southampton
8	FW	Trevor Francis	19 April 1954 (aged 28)	27	(England) Manchester City
9	MF	Glenn Hoddle	27 October 1957 (aged 24)	11	(England) Tottenham Hotspur
10	MF	Terry McDermott	8 December 1951 (aged 30)	25	(England) Liverpool
11	FW	Paul Mariner	22 May 1953 (aged 29)	21	(England) Ipswich Town
12	DF	Mick Mills	4 January 1949 (aged 33)	37	(England) Ipswich Town
13	GK	Joe Corrigan	18 November 1948 (aged 33)	9	(England) Manchester City
14	DF	Phil Neal	20 February 1951 (aged 31)	37	(England) Liverpool
15	MF	Graham Rix	23 October 1957 (aged 24)	8	(England) Arsenal
16	MF	Bryan Robson	11 January 1957 (aged 25)	19	(England) Manchester United
17	DF	Kenny Sansom	26 September 1958 (aged 23)	23	(England) Arsenal
18	DF	Phil Thompson	21 January 1954 (aged 28)	35	(England) Liverpool
19	MF	Ray Wilkins	14 September 1956 (aged 25)	47	(England) Manchester United
20	FW	Peter Withe	30 August 1951 (aged 30)	6	(England) Aston Villa
21	FW	Tony Woodcock	6 December 1955 (aged 26)	22	(West Germany) 1. FC Köln
22	GK	Peter Shilton	18 September 1949 (aged 32)	37	(England) Nottingham Forest

Note that this squad is numbered alphabetically by surname, unlike traditional numbering systems. Despite this, the goalkeepers are given the usual England goalkeepers' numbers 1, 13 & 22 (again alphabetically) and Kevin Keegan is given his favoured 7.

== 1986 World Cup ==
- Progress: Quarter-finals

Head coach: Bobby Robson

No.	Pos.	Player	Date of birth (age)	Caps	Club
1	GK	Peter Shilton	18 September 1949 (aged 36)	81	(England) Southampton
2	DF	Gary M. Stevens	27 March 1963 (aged 23)	9	(England) Everton
3	DF	Kenny Sansom	26 September 1958 (aged 27)	65	(England) Arsenal
4	MF	Glenn Hoddle	27 October 1957 (aged 28)	33	(England) Tottenham Hotspur
5	DF	Alvin Martin	29 July 1958 (aged 27)	15	(England) West Ham United
6	DF	Terry Butcher	28 December 1958 (aged 27)	40	(England) Ipswich Town
7	MF	Bryan Robson (captain)	11 January 1957 (aged 29)	51	(England) Manchester United
8	MF	Ray Wilkins	14 September 1956 (aged 29)	80	(Italy) Milan
9	FW	Mark Hateley	7 November 1961 (aged 24)	18	(Italy) Milan
10	FW	Gary Lineker	30 November 1960 (aged 25)	13	(England) Everton
11	MF	Chris Waddle	14 December 1960 (aged 25)	16	(England) Tottenham Hotspur
12	DF	Viv Anderson	29 July 1956 (aged 29)	21	(England) Arsenal
13	GK	Chris Woods	14 November 1959 (aged 26)	4	(England) Norwich City
14	DF	Terry Fenwick	17 November 1959 (aged 26)	15	(England) Queens Park Rangers
15	DF	Gary A. Stevens	30 March 1962 (aged 24)	5	(England) Tottenham Hotspur
16	MF	Peter Reid	20 June 1956 (aged 29)	6	(England) Everton
17	MF	Trevor Steven	21 September 1963 (aged 22)	10	(England) Everton
18	MF	Steve Hodge	25 October 1962 (aged 23)	3	(England) Aston Villa
19	FW	John Barnes	7 November 1963 (aged 22)	27	(England) Watford
20	FW	Peter Beardsley	18 January 1961 (aged 25)	5	(England) Newcastle United
21	FW	Kerry Dixon	24 July 1961 (aged 24)	6	(England) Chelsea
22	GK	Gary Bailey	9 August 1958 (aged 27)	2	(England) Manchester United

== 1988 European Championship ==
- Progress: Group stage

Head coach: Bobby Robson

No.	Pos.	Player	Date of birth (age)	Caps	Club
1	GK	Peter Shilton	18 September 1949 (aged 38)	98	(England) Derby County
2	DF	Gary M. Stevens	27 March 1963 (aged 25)	23	(England) Everton
3	DF	Kenny Sansom	26 September 1958 (aged 29)	83	(England) Arsenal
4	MF	Neil Webb	30 July 1963 (aged 24)	7	(England) Nottingham Forest
5	DF	Dave Watson	20 November 1961 (aged 26)	11	(England) Everton
6	DF	Tony Adams	10 October 1966 (aged 21)	11	(England) Arsenal
7	MF	Bryan Robson	11 January 1957 (aged 31)	66	(England) Manchester United
8	MF	Trevor Steven	21 September 1963 (aged 24)	23	(England) Everton
9	FW	Peter Beardsley	18 January 1961 (aged 27)	24	(England) Liverpool
10	FW	Gary Lineker	30 November 1960 (aged 27)	32	(Spain) Barcelona
11	MF	John Barnes	7 November 1963 (aged 24)	39	(England) Liverpool
12	MF	Chris Waddle	14 December 1960 (aged 27)	34	(England) Tottenham Hotspur
13	GK	Chris Woods	14 November 1959 (aged 28)	12	(Scotland) Rangers
14	DF	Viv Anderson	29 July 1956 (aged 31)	30	(England) Manchester United
15	MF	Steve McMahon	20 August 1961 (aged 26)	3	(England) Liverpool
16	MF	Peter Reid	20 June 1956 (aged 31)	13	(England) Everton
17	MF	Glenn Hoddle	27 November 1957 (aged 30)	50	(France) Monaco
18	FW	Mark Hateley	7 November 1961 (aged 26)	28	(France) Monaco
19	DF	Mark Wright	1 August 1963 (aged 24)	20	(England) Derby County
20	DF	Tony Dorigo	31 December 1965 (aged 22)	0	(England) Chelsea

== 1990 World Cup ==
- Progress: Fourth place

Head coach: Bobby Robson

No.	Pos.	Player	Date of birth (age)	Caps	Club
1	GK	Peter Shilton	18 September 1949 (aged 40)	118	(England) Derby County
2	DF	Gary Stevens	27 March 1963 (aged 27)	39	(Scotland) Rangers
3	DF	Stuart Pearce	24 April 1962 (aged 28)	24	(England) Nottingham Forest
4	MF	Neil Webb	30 July 1963 (aged 26)	19	(England) Manchester United
5	DF	Des Walker	26 November 1965 (aged 24)	18	(England) Nottingham Forest
6	DF	Terry Butcher	28 December 1958 (aged 31)	72	(Scotland) Rangers
7	MF	Bryan Robson (captain)	11 January 1957 (aged 33)	85	(England) Manchester United
8	MF	Chris Waddle	14 December 1960 (aged 29)	52	(France) Marseille
9	FW	Peter Beardsley	18 January 1961 (aged 29)	40	(England) Liverpool
10	FW	Gary Lineker	30 November 1960 (aged 29)	51	(England) Tottenham Hotspur
11	MF	John Barnes	7 November 1963 (aged 26)	53	(England) Liverpool
12	DF	Paul Parker	4 April 1964 (aged 26)	5	(England) Queens Park Rangers
13	GK	Chris Woods	14 November 1959 (aged 30)	16	(Scotland) Rangers
14	DF	Mark Wright	1 August 1963 (aged 26)	24	(England) Derby County
15	DF	Tony Dorigo	31 December 1965 (aged 24)	3	(England) Chelsea
16	MF	Steve McMahon	20 August 1961 (aged 28)	12	(England) Liverpool
17	MF	David Platt	10 June 1966 (aged 23)	5	(England) Aston Villa
18	MF	Steve Hodge	25 October 1962 (aged 27)	22	(England) Nottingham Forest
19	MF	Paul Gascoigne	27 May 1967 (aged 23)	11	(England) Tottenham Hotspur
20	MF	Trevor Steven	21 September 1963 (aged 26)	26	(Scotland) Rangers
21	FW	Steve Bull	28 March 1965 (aged 25)	7	(England) Wolverhampton Wanderers
22	GK	David Seaman*	19 September 1963 (aged 26)	3	(England) Queens Park Rangers

No.	Pos.	Player	Date of birth (age)	Caps	Club
22	GK	Dave Beasant	20 March 1959 (aged 31)	2	(England) Chelsea

* David Seaman was originally selected, but after the first game in Italy, he had to pull out of the squad due to a thumb injury and was replaced by Dave Beasant.

== 1992 European Championship ==
- Progress: Group stage

Head coach: Graham Taylor

No.	Pos.	Player	Date of birth (age)	Caps	Club
1	GK	Chris Woods	14 November 1959 (aged 32)	31	(England) Sheffield Wednesday
2	DF	Keith Curle	14 November 1963 (aged 28)	2	(England) Manchester City
3	DF	Stuart Pearce	24 April 1962 (aged 30)	47	(England) Nottingham Forest
4	DF	Martin Keown	24 July 1966 (aged 25)	6	(England) Everton
5	DF	Des Walker	26 November 1965 (aged 26)	44	(England) Nottingham Forest
6	DF	Mark Wright	1 August 1963 (aged 28)	42	(England) Liverpool
7	MF	David Platt	10 June 1966 (aged 26)	29	(Italy) Bari
8	MF	Trevor Steven	21 September 1963 (aged 28)	34	(France) Marseille
9	FW	Nigel Clough	19 March 1966 (aged 26)	7	(England) Nottingham Forest
10	FW	Gary Lineker	30 November 1960 (aged 31)	77	(England) Tottenham Hotspur
11	MF	Andy Sinton	19 March 1966 (aged 26)	4	(England) Queens Park Rangers
12	MF	Carlton Palmer	5 December 1965 (aged 26)	4	(England) Sheffield Wednesday
13	GK	Nigel Martyn	11 August 1966 (aged 25)	2	(England) Crystal Palace
14	DF	Tony Dorigo	31 December 1965 (aged 26)	10	(England) Leeds United
15	MF	Neil Webb	30 July 1963 (aged 28)	24	(England) Manchester United
16	MF	Paul Merson	20 March 1968 (aged 24)	5	(England) Arsenal
17	FW	Alan Smith	21 November 1962 (aged 29)	11	(England) Arsenal
18	MF	Tony Daley	18 October 1967 (aged 24)	5	(England) Aston Villa
19	MF	David Batty	2 December 1968 (aged 23)	8	(England) Leeds United
20	FW	Alan Shearer	13 August 1970 (aged 21)	2	(England) Southampton

== 1996 European Championship ==
- Progress: Semi-finals

Head coach: Terry Venables

No.	Pos.	Player	Date of birth (age)	Caps	Club
1	GK	David Seaman	19 September 1963 (aged 32)	24	(England) Arsenal
2	DF	Gary Neville	18 February 1975 (aged 21)	10	(England) Manchester United
3	DF	Stuart Pearce	24 April 1962 (aged 34)	65	(England) Nottingham Forest
4	MF	Paul Ince	21 October 1967 (aged 28)	19	(Italy) Internazionale
5	DF	Tony Adams (captain)	10 October 1966 (aged 29)	40	(England) Arsenal
6	DF	Gareth Southgate	3 September 1970 (aged 25)	4	(England) Aston Villa
7	MF	David Platt	10 June 1966 (aged 29)	58	(England) Arsenal
8	MF	Paul Gascoigne	27 May 1967 (aged 29)	38	(Scotland) Rangers
9	FW	Alan Shearer	13 August 1970 (aged 25)	23	(England) Blackburn Rovers
10	FW	Teddy Sheringham	2 April 1966 (aged 30)	15	(England) Tottenham Hotspur
11	MF	Darren Anderton	3 March 1972 (aged 24)	11	(England) Tottenham Hotspur
12	DF	Steve Howey	26 October 1971 (aged 24)	4	(England) Newcastle United
13	GK	Ian Walker	31 October 1971 (aged 24)	2	(England) Tottenham Hotspur
14	MF	Nick Barmby	11 February 1974 (aged 22)	6	(England) Middlesbrough
15	MF	Jamie Redknapp	25 June 1973 (aged 22)	4	(England) Liverpool
16	DF	Sol Campbell	18 September 1974 (aged 21)	1	(England) Tottenham Hotspur
17	MF	Steve McManaman	11 February 1972 (aged 24)	10	(England) Liverpool
18	FW	Les Ferdinand	8 December 1966 (aged 29)	10	(England) Newcastle United
19	DF	Phil Neville	21 January 1977 (aged 19)	1	(England) Manchester United
20	MF	Steve Stone	20 August 1971 (aged 24)	6	(England) Nottingham Forest
21	FW	Robbie Fowler	9 April 1975 (aged 21)	3	(England) Liverpool
22	GK	Tim Flowers	3 February 1967 (aged 29)	8	(England) Blackburn Rovers

== 1998 World Cup ==
- Progress: Round of 16

Head coach: Glenn Hoddle

No.	Pos.	Player	Date of birth (age)	Caps	Club
1	GK	David Seaman	19 September 1963 (aged 34)	40	(England) Arsenal
2	DF	Sol Campbell	18 September 1974 (aged 23)	16	(England) Tottenham Hotspur
3	DF	Graeme Le Saux	17 October 1968 (aged 29)	25	(England) Chelsea
4	MF	Paul Ince	21 October 1967 (aged 30)	39	(England) Liverpool
5	DF	Tony Adams	10 October 1966 (aged 31)	51	(England) Arsenal
6	DF	Gareth Southgate	3 September 1970 (aged 27)	25	(England) Aston Villa
7	MF	David Beckham	2 May 1975 (aged 23)	15	(England) Manchester United
8	MF	David Batty	2 December 1968 (aged 29)	31	(England) Newcastle United
9	FW	Alan Shearer (captain)	13 August 1970 (aged 27)	39	(England) Newcastle United
10	FW	Teddy Sheringham	2 April 1966 (aged 32)	33	(England) Manchester United
11	MF	Steve McManaman	11 February 1972 (aged 26)	21	(England) Liverpool
12	DF	Gary Neville	18 February 1975 (aged 23)	27	(England) Manchester United
13	GK	Nigel Martyn	11 August 1966 (aged 31)	7	(England) Leeds United
14	MF	Darren Anderton	3 March 1972 (aged 26)	18	(England) Tottenham Hotspur
15	MF	Paul Merson	20 March 1968 (aged 30)	18	(England) Middlesbrough
16	MF	Paul Scholes	16 November 1974 (aged 23)	7	(England) Manchester United
17	MF	Rob Lee	1 February 1966 (aged 32)	17	(England) Newcastle United
18	DF	Martin Keown	24 July 1966 (aged 31)	18	(England) Arsenal
19	FW	Les Ferdinand	8 December 1966 (aged 31)	17	(England) Tottenham Hotspur
20	FW	Michael Owen	14 December 1979 (aged 18)	5	(England) Liverpool
21	DF	Rio Ferdinand	7 November 1978 (aged 19)	3	(England) West Ham United
22	GK	Tim Flowers	3 February 1967 (aged 31)	11	(England) Blackburn Rovers

== 2000 European Championship ==
- Progress: Group stage

Head coach: Kevin Keegan

No.	Pos.	Player	Date of birth (age)	Caps	Club
1	GK	David Seaman	19 September 1963 (aged 36)	57	(England) Arsenal
2	DF	Gary Neville	18 February 1975 (aged 25)	38	(England) Manchester United
3	DF	Phil Neville	21 January 1977 (aged 23)	25	(England) Manchester United
4	DF	Sol Campbell	18 September 1974 (aged 25)	32	(England) Tottenham Hotspur
5	DF	Tony Adams	10 October 1966 (aged 33)	62	(England) Arsenal
6	DF	Martin Keown	24 July 1966 (aged 33)	30	(England) Arsenal
7	MF	David Beckham	2 May 1975 (aged 25)	30	(England) Manchester United
8	MF	Paul Scholes	16 November 1974 (aged 25)	22	(England) Manchester United
9	FW	Alan Shearer (captain)	13 August 1970 (aged 29)	59	(England) Newcastle United
10	FW	Michael Owen	14 December 1979 (aged 20)	19	(England) Liverpool
11	MF	Steve McManaman	11 February 1972 (aged 28)	27	(Spain) Real Madrid
12	DF	Gareth Southgate	3 September 1970 (aged 29)	35	(England) Aston Villa
13	GK	Nigel Martyn	11 August 1966 (aged 33)	11	(England) Leeds United
14	MF	Paul Ince	21 October 1967 (aged 32)	50	(England) Middlesbrough
15	DF	Gareth Barry	23 February 1981 (aged 19)	2	(England) Aston Villa
16	MF	Steven Gerrard	30 May 1980 (aged 20)	1	(England) Liverpool
17	MF	Dennis Wise	15 December 1966 (aged 33)	16	(England) Chelsea
18	MF	Nick Barmby	11 February 1974 (aged 26)	13	(England) Everton
19	FW	Emile Heskey	11 January 1978 (aged 22)	7	(England) Liverpool
20	FW	Kevin Phillips	25 July 1973 (aged 26)	5	(England) Sunderland
21	FW	Robbie Fowler	9 April 1975 (aged 25)	14	(England) Liverpool
22	GK	Richard Wright	5 November 1977 (aged 22)	1	(England) Ipswich Town

== 2002 World Cup ==
- Progress: Quarter-finals

Head coach: (Sweden) Sven-Göran Eriksson

No.	Pos.	Player	Date of birth (age)	Caps	Club
1	GK	David Seaman	19 September 1963 (aged 38)	68	(England) Arsenal
2	DF	Danny Mills	18 May 1977 (aged 25)	7	(England) Leeds United
3	DF	Ashley Cole	20 December 1980 (aged 21)	8	(England) Arsenal
4	MF	Trevor Sinclair	2 March 1973 (aged 29)	5	(England) West Ham United
5	DF	Rio Ferdinand	7 November 1978 (aged 23)	21	(England) Leeds United
6	DF	Sol Campbell	18 September 1974 (aged 27)	45	(England) Arsenal
7	MF	David Beckham (captain)	2 May 1975 (aged 27)	49	(England) Manchester United
8	MF	Paul Scholes	16 November 1974 (aged 27)	43	(England) Manchester United
9	FW	Robbie Fowler	9 April 1975 (aged 27)	24	(England) Leeds United
10	FW	Michael Owen	14 December 1979 (aged 22)	35	(England) Liverpool
11	FW	Emile Heskey	11 January 1978 (aged 24)	23	(England) Liverpool
12	DF	Wes Brown	13 October 1979 (aged 22)	6	(England) Manchester United
13	GK	Nigel Martyn	11 August 1966 (aged 35)	22	(England) Leeds United
14	DF	Wayne Bridge	5 August 1980 (aged 21)	5	(England) Southampton
15	DF	Martin Keown	24 July 1966 (aged 35)	42	(England) Arsenal
16	DF	Gareth Southgate	3 September 1970 (aged 31)	48	(England) Middlesbrough
17	FW	Teddy Sheringham	2 April 1966 (aged 36)	46	(England) Tottenham Hotspur
18	MF	Owen Hargreaves	20 January 1981 (aged 21)	6	(Germany) Bayern Munich
19	MF	Joe Cole	8 November 1981 (aged 20)	6	(England) West Ham United
20	FW	Darius Vassell	13 June 1980 (aged 21)	5	(England) Aston Villa
21	MF	Nicky Butt	21 January 1975 (aged 27)	18	(England) Manchester United
22	GK	David James	1 August 1970 (aged 31)	9	(England) West Ham United
23	MF	Kieron Dyer	29 December 1978 (aged 23)	9	(England) Newcastle United

== 2004 European Championship ==
- Progress: Quarter-finals

Head coach: (Sweden) Sven-Göran Eriksson

No.	Pos.	Player	Date of birth (age)	Caps	Club
1	GK	David James	1 August 1970 (aged 33)	24	(England) Manchester City
2	DF	Gary Neville	18 February 1975 (aged 29)	63	(England) Manchester United
3	DF	Ashley Cole	20 December 1980 (aged 23)	26	(England) Arsenal
4	MF	Steven Gerrard	30 May 1980 (aged 24)	24	(England) Liverpool
5	DF	John Terry	7 December 1980 (aged 23)	8	(England) Chelsea
6	DF	Sol Campbell	18 September 1974 (aged 29)	58	(England) Arsenal
7	MF	David Beckham (captain)	2 May 1975 (aged 29)	68	(Spain) Real Madrid
8	MF	Paul Scholes	16 November 1974 (aged 29)	62	(England) Manchester United
9	FW	Wayne Rooney	24 October 1985 (aged 18)	13	(England) Everton
10	FW	Michael Owen	14 December 1979 (aged 24)	56	(England) Liverpool
11	MF	Frank Lampard	20 June 1978 (aged 25)	19	(England) Chelsea
12	DF	Wayne Bridge	5 August 1980 (aged 23)	17	(England) Chelsea
13	GK	Paul Robinson	15 October 1979 (aged 24)	5	(England) Tottenham Hotspur
14	DF	Phil Neville	21 January 1977 (aged 27)	48	(England) Manchester United
15	DF	Ledley King	12 October 1980 (aged 23)	5	(England) Tottenham Hotspur
16	DF	Jamie Carragher	28 January 1978 (aged 26)	12	(England) Liverpool
17	MF	Nicky Butt	21 January 1975 (aged 29)	35	(England) Manchester United
18	MF	Owen Hargreaves	20 January 1981 (aged 23)	19	(Germany) Bayern Munich
19	MF	Joe Cole	8 November 1981 (aged 22)	17	(England) Chelsea
20	MF	Kieron Dyer	29 December 1978 (aged 25)	22	(England) Newcastle United
21	FW	Emile Heskey	11 January 1978 (aged 26)	42	(England) Birmingham City
22	GK	Ian Walker	31 October 1971 (aged 32)	4	(England) Leicester City
23	FW	Darius Vassell	13 June 1980 (aged 23)	18	(England) Aston Villa

== 2006 World Cup ==
- Progress: Quarter-finals

Head coach: (Sweden) Sven-Göran Eriksson

No.	Pos.	Player	Date of birth (age)	Caps	Club
1	GK	Paul Robinson	15 October 1979 (aged 26)	21	(England) Tottenham Hotspur
2	DF	Gary Neville	18 February 1975 (aged 31)	79	(England) Manchester United
3	DF	Ashley Cole	20 December 1980 (aged 25)	46	(England) Arsenal
4	MF	Steven Gerrard	30 May 1980 (aged 26)	42	(England) Liverpool
5	DF	Rio Ferdinand	7 November 1978 (aged 27)	47	(England) Manchester United
6	DF	John Terry	7 December 1980 (aged 25)	24	(England) Chelsea
7	MF	David Beckham (captain)	2 May 1975 (aged 31)	89	(Spain) Real Madrid
8	MF	Frank Lampard	20 June 1978 (aged 27)	40	(England) Chelsea
9	FW	Wayne Rooney	24 October 1985 (aged 20)	29	(England) Manchester United
10	FW	Michael Owen	14 December 1979 (aged 26)	77	(England) Newcastle United
11	MF	Joe Cole	8 November 1981 (aged 24)	32	(England) Chelsea
12	DF	Sol Campbell	18 September 1974 (aged 31)	68	(England) Arsenal
13	GK	David James	1 August 1970 (aged 35)	34	(England) Manchester City
14	DF	Wayne Bridge	5 August 1980 (aged 25)	23	(England) Chelsea
15	DF	Jamie Carragher	28 January 1978 (aged 28)	25	(England) Liverpool
16	MF	Owen Hargreaves	20 January 1981 (aged 25)	30	(Germany) Bayern Munich
17	MF	Jermaine Jenas	18 February 1983 (aged 23)	15	(England) Tottenham Hotspur
18	MF	Michael Carrick	28 July 1981 (aged 24)	6	(England) Tottenham Hotspur
19	MF	Aaron Lennon	16 April 1987 (aged 19)	1	(England) Tottenham Hotspur
20	MF	Stewart Downing	22 July 1984 (aged 21)	2	(England) Middlesbrough
21	FW	Peter Crouch	30 January 1981 (aged 25)	7	(England) Liverpool
22	GK	Scott Carson	3 September 1985 (aged 20)	0	(England) Liverpool
23	FW	Theo Walcott	16 March 1989 (aged 17)	1	(England) Arsenal

== 2010 World Cup ==
- Progress: Round of 16

Head coach: (Italy) Fabio Capello

No.	Pos.	Player	Date of birth (age)	Caps	Club
1	GK	David James	1 August 1970 (aged 39)	50	(England) Portsmouth
2	DF	Glen Johnson	23 August 1984 (aged 25)	20	(England) Liverpool
3	DF	Ashley Cole	20 December 1980 (aged 29)	77	(England) Chelsea
4	MF	Steven Gerrard (captain)	30 May 1980 (aged 30)	78	(England) Liverpool
5	DF	Michael Dawson	18 November 1983 (aged 26)	0	(England) Tottenham Hotspur
6	DF	John Terry	7 December 1980 (aged 29)	59	(England) Chelsea
7	MF	Aaron Lennon	16 April 1987 (aged 23)	15	(England) Tottenham Hotspur
8	MF	Frank Lampard	20 June 1978 (aged 31)	77	(England) Chelsea
9	FW	Peter Crouch	30 January 1981 (aged 29)	37	(England) Tottenham Hotspur
10	FW	Wayne Rooney	24 October 1985 (aged 24)	58	(England) Manchester United
11	MF	Joe Cole	8 November 1981 (aged 28)	53	(England) Chelsea
12	GK	Robert Green	18 January 1980 (aged 30)	9	(England) West Ham United
13	DF	Stephen Warnock	12 December 1981 (aged 28)	1	(England) Aston Villa
14	MF	Gareth Barry	23 February 1981 (aged 29)	36	(England) Manchester City
15	DF	Matthew Upson	18 April 1979 (aged 31)	19	(England) West Ham United
16	MF	James Milner	4 January 1986 (aged 24)	7	(England) Aston Villa
17	MF	Shaun Wright-Phillips	25 October 1981 (aged 28)	30	(England) Manchester City
18	DF	Jamie Carragher	28 January 1978 (aged 32)	34	(England) Liverpool
19	FW	Jermain Defoe	7 October 1982 (aged 27)	39	(England) Tottenham Hotspur
20	DF	Ledley King	12 October 1980 (aged 29)	19	(England) Tottenham Hotspur
21	FW	Emile Heskey	11 January 1978 (aged 32)	57	(England) Aston Villa
22	MF	Michael Carrick	28 July 1981 (aged 28)	21	(England) Manchester United
23	GK	Joe Hart	19 April 1987 (aged 23)	1	(England) Manchester City

A provisional 30-man England squad for the 2010 World Cup was announced on 11 May 2010. This was then reduced to the official 23-man squad, announced on 1 June 2010. The seven players dropped from the provisional squad were Leighton Baines, Darren Bent, Michael Dawson, Tom Huddlestone, Adam Johnson, Scott Parker and Theo Walcott. Dawson was subsequently called up after a knee injury to captain Rio Ferdinand.

== 2012 European Championship ==
- Progress: Quarter-finals

Head coach: Roy Hodgson

Roy Hodgson announced England's 23-man squad on 16 May 2012, along with a five-man stand-by list. The England team is the only squad to consist entirely of players from their domestic league. On 25 May, John Ruddy was ruled out with a broken finger; Jack Butland was called up as his replacement. On 28 May, Gareth Barry was ruled out with a groin injury, being replaced by Phil Jagielka. On 31 May, Frank Lampard was ruled out with a thigh injury and was replaced by Jordan Henderson. On 3 June, Gary Cahill was ruled out with a double fracture of his jaw and Martin Kelly was called up as his replacement.

No.	Pos.	Player	Date of birth (age)	Caps	Club
1	GK	Joe Hart	19 April 1987 (aged 25)	17	(England) Manchester City
2	DF	Glen Johnson	23 August 1984 (aged 27)	35	(England) Liverpool
3	DF	Ashley Cole	20 December 1980 (aged 31)	93	(England) Chelsea
4	MF	Steven Gerrard (captain)	30 May 1980 (aged 32)	90	(England) Liverpool
5	DF	Martin Kelly	27 April 1990 (aged 22)	1	(England) Liverpool
6	DF	John Terry	7 December 1980 (aged 31)	72	(England) Chelsea
7	MF	Theo Walcott	16 March 1989 (aged 23)	22	(England) Arsenal
8	MF	Jordan Henderson	17 June 1990 (aged 21)	2	(England) Liverpool
9	FW	Andy Carroll	6 January 1989 (aged 23)	3	(England) Liverpool
10	FW	Wayne Rooney	24 October 1985 (aged 26)	73	(England) Manchester United
11	MF	Ashley Young	9 July 1985 (aged 26)	19	(England) Manchester United
12	DF	Leighton Baines	11 December 1984 (aged 27)	7	(England) Everton
13	GK	Robert Green	18 January 1980 (aged 32)	11	(England) West Ham United
14	DF	Phil Jones	21 February 1992 (aged 20)	4	(England) Manchester United
15	DF	Joleon Lescott	16 August 1982 (aged 29)	14	(England) Manchester City
16	MF	James Milner	4 January 1986 (aged 26)	24	(England) Manchester City
17	MF	Scott Parker	13 October 1980 (aged 31)	11	(England) Tottenham Hotspur
18	DF	Phil Jagielka	17 August 1982 (aged 29)	11	(England) Everton
19	MF	Stewart Downing	22 July 1984 (aged 27)	33	(England) Liverpool
20	MF	Alex Oxlade-Chamberlain	15 August 1993 (aged 18)	1	(England) Arsenal
21	FW	Jermain Defoe	7 October 1982 (aged 29)	46	(England) Tottenham Hotspur
22	FW	Danny Welbeck	26 November 1990 (aged 21)	4	(England) Manchester United
23	GK	Jack Butland	10 March 1993 (aged 19)	0	(England) Birmingham City

== 2014 World Cup ==
- Progress: Group stage

Head coach: Roy Hodgson

England's final squad was announced on 12 May 2014, including seven standby squad members: John Ruddy, Jon Flanagan, John Stones, Michael Carrick, Tom Cleverley, Andy Carroll and Jermain Defoe. Of those seven, only Stones and Flanagan joined the rest of the squad at a training camp in Portugal, with Stones serving as a like-for-like replacement option for Phil Jones, who was still recovering from a shoulder injury. Both Stones and Flanagan travelled with the squad to their pre-tournament training base in Miami, and are expected to remain with the team in Brazil should any injuries be suffered ahead of the opening game. The squad numbers were revealed on 22 May.

No.	Pos.	Player	Date of birth (age)	Caps	Club
1	GK	Joe Hart	19 May 1987 (aged 27)	41	(England) Manchester City
2	DF	Glen Johnson	23 August 1984 (aged 29)	52	(England) Liverpool
3	DF	Leighton Baines	11 December 1984 (aged 29)	24	(England) Everton
4	MF	Steven Gerrard (captain)	30 May 1980 (aged 34)	111	(England) Liverpool
5	DF	Gary Cahill	19 December 1985 (aged 28)	24	(England) Chelsea
6	DF	Phil Jagielka	17 August 1982 (aged 31)	26	(England) Everton
7	MF	Jack Wilshere	1 January 1992 (aged 22)	18	(England) Arsenal
8	MF	Frank Lampard	20 June 1978 (aged 35)	105	(England) Chelsea
9	FW	Daniel Sturridge	1 September 1989 (aged 24)	12	(England) Liverpool
10	FW	Wayne Rooney	24 October 1985 (aged 28)	92	(England) Manchester United
11	FW	Danny Welbeck	26 November 1990 (aged 23)	24	(England) Manchester United
12	DF	Chris Smalling	22 November 1989 (aged 24)	12	(England) Manchester United
13	GK	Ben Foster	3 May 1983 (aged 31)	7	(England) West Bromwich Albion
14	MF	Jordan Henderson	17 June 1990 (aged 23)	11	(England) Liverpool
15	MF	Alex Oxlade-Chamberlain	15 August 1993 (aged 20)	15	(England) Arsenal
16	DF	Phil Jones	21 February 1992 (aged 22)	10	(England) Manchester United
17	MF	James Milner	4 January 1986 (aged 28)	47	(England) Manchester City
18	FW	Rickie Lambert	16 February 1982 (aged 32)	6	(England) Liverpool
19	MF	Raheem Sterling	8 December 1994 (aged 19)	4	(England) Liverpool
20	MF	Adam Lallana	10 May 1988 (aged 26)	6	(England) Southampton
21	MF	Ross Barkley	5 December 1993 (aged 20)	6	(England) Everton
22	GK	Fraser Forster	17 March 1988 (aged 26)	2	(Scotland) Celtic
23	DF	Luke Shaw	12 July 1995 (aged 18)	2	(England) Manchester United

== 2016 European Championship ==
- Progress: Round of 16

Head coach: Roy Hodgson

England named their final squad on 31 May.

No.	Pos.	Player	Date of birth (age)	Caps	Goals	Club
1	GK	Joe Hart	19 April 1987 (aged 29)	59	0	(The Football Association) Manchester City
2	DF	Kyle Walker	28 May 1990 (aged 26)	16	0	(The Football Association) Tottenham Hotspur
3	DF	Danny Rose	2 July 1990 (aged 25)	4	0	(The Football Association) Tottenham Hotspur
4	MF	James Milner	4 January 1986 (aged 30)	60	1	(The Football Association) Liverpool
5	DF	Gary Cahill	19 December 1985 (aged 30)	43	3	(The Football Association) Chelsea
6	DF	Chris Smalling	22 November 1989 (aged 26)	25	1	(The Football Association) Manchester United
7	MF	Raheem Sterling	8 December 1994 (aged 21)	23	2	(The Football Association) Manchester City
8	MF	Adam Lallana	10 May 1988 (aged 28)	23	0	(The Football Association) Liverpool
9	FW	Harry Kane	28 July 1993 (aged 22)	12	5	(The Football Association) Tottenham Hotspur
10	FW	Wayne Rooney (captain)	24 October 1985 (aged 30)	111	52	(The Football Association) Manchester United
11	FW	Jamie Vardy	11 January 1987 (aged 29)	8	3	(The Football Association) Leicester City
12	DF	Nathaniel Clyne	5 April 1991 (aged 25)	12	0	(The Football Association) Liverpool
13	GK	Fraser Forster	17 March 1988 (aged 28)	6	0	(The Football Association) Southampton
14	MF	Jordan Henderson	17 June 1990 (aged 25)	26	0	(The Football Association) Liverpool
15	FW	Daniel Sturridge	1 September 1989 (aged 26)	18	5	(The Football Association) Liverpool
16	DF	John Stones	28 May 1994 (aged 22)	10	0	(The Football Association) Everton
17	MF	Eric Dier	15 January 1994 (aged 22)	7	1	(The Football Association) Tottenham Hotspur
18	MF	Jack Wilshere	1 January 1992 (aged 24)	31	2	(The Football Association) Arsenal
19	MF	Ross Barkley	5 December 1993 (aged 22)	22	2	(The Football Association) Everton
20	MF	Dele Alli	11 April 1996 (aged 20)	8	1	(The Football Association) Tottenham Hotspur
21	DF	Ryan Bertrand	5 August 1989 (aged 26)	8	0	(The Football Association) Southampton
22	FW	Marcus Rashford	31 October 1997 (aged 18)	1	1	(The Football Association) Manchester United
23	GK	Tom Heaton	15 April 1986 (aged 30)	1	0	(The Football Association) Burnley

== 2018 World Cup ==
- Progress: Fourth place

Head coach: Gareth Southgate

England's final squad was announced on 17 May 2018, including five standby squad members: Lewis Cook, Tom Heaton, Adam Lallana, Jake Livermore, and James Tarkowski.

No.	Pos.	Player	Date of birth (age)	Caps	Goals	Club
1	GK	Jordan Pickford	7 March 1994 (aged 24)	3	0	(The Football Association) Everton
2	DF	Kyle Walker	28 May 1990 (aged 28)	35	0	(The Football Association) Manchester City
3	DF	Danny Rose	2 July 1990 (aged 27)	18	0	(The Football Association) Tottenham Hotspur
4	MF	Eric Dier	15 January 1994 (aged 24)	26	3	(The Football Association) Tottenham Hotspur
5	DF	John Stones	28 May 1994 (aged 24)	26	0	(The Football Association) Manchester City
6	DF	Harry Maguire	5 March 1993 (aged 25)	5	0	(The Football Association) Leicester City
7	MF	Jesse Lingard	15 December 1992 (aged 25)	12	1	(The Football Association) Manchester United
8	MF	Jordan Henderson	17 June 1990 (aged 27)	39	0	(The Football Association) Liverpool
9	FW	Harry Kane (captain)	28 July 1993 (aged 24)	24	13	(The Football Association) Tottenham Hotspur
10	FW	Raheem Sterling	8 December 1994 (aged 23)	38	2	(The Football Association) Manchester City
11	FW	Jamie Vardy	11 January 1987 (aged 31)	22	7	(The Football Association) Leicester City
12	DF	Kieran Trippier	19 September 1990 (aged 27)	7	0	(The Football Association) Tottenham Hotspur
13	GK	Jack Butland	10 March 1993 (aged 25)	8	0	(The Football Association) Stoke City
14	FW	Danny Welbeck	26 November 1990 (aged 27)	39	16	(The Football Association) Arsenal
15	DF	Gary Cahill	19 December 1985 (aged 32)	60	5	(The Football Association) Chelsea
16	DF	Phil Jones	21 February 1992 (aged 26)	25	0	(The Football Association) Manchester United
17	DF	Fabian Delph	21 November 1989 (aged 28)	11	0	(The Football Association) Manchester City
18	DF	Ashley Young	9 July 1985 (aged 32)	34	7	(The Football Association) Manchester United
19	FW	Marcus Rashford	31 October 1997 (aged 20)	19	3	(The Football Association) Manchester United
20	MF	Dele Alli	11 April 1996 (aged 22)	25	2	(The Football Association) Tottenham Hotspur
21	MF	Ruben Loftus-Cheek	23 January 1996 (aged 22)	4	0	(The Football Association) Crystal Palace
22	DF	Trent Alexander-Arnold	7 October 1998 (aged 19)	1	0	(The Football Association) Liverpool
23	GK	Nick Pope	19 April 1992 (aged 26)	1	0	(The Football Association) Burnley

== 2020 European Championship ==
- Progress: Runners-up

Head coach: Gareth Southgate

England announced a 33-man preliminary squad on 25 May 2021. Mason Greenwood withdrew injured on 1 June, with the final squad announced later that day. Trent Alexander-Arnold withdrew injured on 3 June, and was replaced by Ben White on 7 June.

No.	Pos.	Player	Date of birth (age)	Caps	Goals	Club
1	GK	Jordan Pickford	7 March 1994 (aged 27)	31	0	(The Football Association) Everton
2	DF	Kyle Walker	28 May 1990 (aged 31)	55	0	(The Football Association) Manchester City
3	DF	Luke Shaw	12 July 1995 (aged 25)	10	0	(The Football Association) Manchester United
4	MF	Declan Rice	14 January 1999 (aged 22)	17	1	(The Football Association) West Ham United
5	DF	John Stones	28 May 1994 (aged 27)	42	2	(The Football Association) Manchester City
6	DF	Harry Maguire	5 March 1993 (aged 28)	32	3	(The Football Association) Manchester United
7	MF	Jack Grealish	10 September 1995 (aged 25)	7	0	(The Football Association) Aston Villa
8	MF	Jordan Henderson	17 June 1990 (aged 30)	59	0	(The Football Association) Liverpool
9	FW	Harry Kane (captain)	28 July 1993 (aged 27)	54	34	(The Football Association) Tottenham Hotspur
10	FW	Raheem Sterling	8 December 1994 (aged 26)	61	14	(The Football Association) Manchester City
11	FW	Marcus Rashford	31 October 1997 (aged 23)	41	12	(The Football Association) Manchester United
12	DF	Kieran Trippier	19 September 1990 (aged 30)	28	1	(Royal Spanish Football Federation) Atlético Madrid
13	GK	Dean Henderson	12 March 1997 (aged 24)	1	0	(The Football Association) Manchester United
14	MF	Kalvin Phillips	2 December 1995 (aged 25)	8	0	(The Football Association) Leeds United
15	DF	Tyrone Mings	13 March 1993 (aged 28)	10	0	(The Football Association) Aston Villa
16	DF	Conor Coady	25 February 1993 (aged 28)	5	1	(The Football Association) Wolverhampton Wanderers
17	MF	Jadon Sancho	25 March 2000 (aged 21)	19	3	(German Football Association) Borussia Dortmund
18	FW	Dominic Calvert-Lewin	16 March 1997 (aged 24)	9	4	(The Football Association) Everton
19	MF	Mason Mount	10 January 1999 (aged 22)	16	4	(The Football Association) Chelsea
20	MF	Phil Foden	28 May 2000 (aged 21)	6	2	(The Football Association) Manchester City
21	DF	Ben Chilwell	21 December 1996 (aged 24)	14	0	(The Football Association) Chelsea
22	DF	Ben White	8 October 1997 (aged 23)	2	0	(The Football Association) Brighton & Hove Albion
23	GK	Sam Johnstone	25 March 1993 (aged 28)	1	0	(The Football Association) West Bromwich Albion
24	DF	Reece James	8 December 1999 (aged 21)	6	0	(The Football Association) Chelsea
25	MF	Bukayo Saka	5 September 2001 (aged 19)	5	1	(The Football Association) Arsenal
26	MF	Jude Bellingham	29 June 2003 (aged 17)	4	0	(German Football Association) Borussia Dortmund

== 2022 World Cup ==
- Progress: Quarter-finals

Head coach: Gareth Southgate

England's final squad was announced on 10 November 2022. Ben White withdrew from the squad on 30 November for personal reasons.

No.	Pos.	Player	Date of birth (age)	Caps	Goals	Club
1	GK	Jordan Pickford	7 March 1994 (aged 28)	45	0	(The Football Association) Everton
2	DF	Kyle Walker	28 May 1990 (aged 32)	70	0	(The Football Association) Manchester City
3	DF	Luke Shaw	12 July 1995 (aged 27)	23	3	(The Football Association) Manchester United
4	MF	Declan Rice	14 January 1999 (aged 23)	34	2	(The Football Association) West Ham United
5	DF	John Stones	28 May 1994 (aged 28)	59	3	(The Football Association) Manchester City
6	DF	Harry Maguire	5 March 1993 (aged 29)	48	7	(The Football Association) Manchester United
7	FW	Jack Grealish	10 September 1995 (aged 27)	24	1	(The Football Association) Manchester City
8	MF	Jordan Henderson	17 June 1990 (aged 32)	70	2	(The Football Association) Liverpool
9	FW	Harry Kane (captain)	28 July 1993 (aged 29)	75	51	(The Football Association) Tottenham Hotspur
10	FW	Raheem Sterling	8 December 1994 (aged 27)	79	19	(The Football Association) Chelsea
11	FW	Marcus Rashford	31 October 1997 (aged 25)	46	12	(The Football Association) Manchester United
12	DF	Kieran Trippier	19 September 1990 (aged 32)	37	1	(The Football Association) Newcastle United
13	GK	Nick Pope	19 April 1992 (aged 30)	10	0	(The Football Association) Newcastle United
14	MF	Kalvin Phillips	2 December 1995 (aged 26)	23	0	(The Football Association) Manchester City
15	DF	Eric Dier	15 January 1994 (aged 28)	47	3	(The Football Association) Tottenham Hotspur
16	DF	Conor Coady	25 February 1993 (aged 29)	10	1	(The Football Association) Everton
17	FW	Bukayo Saka	5 September 2001 (aged 21)	20	4	(The Football Association) Arsenal
18	DF	Trent Alexander-Arnold	7 October 1998 (aged 24)	17	1	(The Football Association) Liverpool
19	MF	Mason Mount	10 January 1999 (aged 23)	32	5	(The Football Association) Chelsea
20	MF	Phil Foden	28 May 2000 (aged 22)	18	2	(The Football Association) Manchester City
21	DF	Ben White	8 October 1997 (aged 25)	4	0	(The Football Association) Arsenal
22	MF	Jude Bellingham	29 June 2003 (aged 19)	17	0	(German Football Association) Borussia Dortmund
23	GK	Aaron Ramsdale	14 May 1998 (aged 24)	3	0	(The Football Association) Arsenal
24	FW	Callum Wilson	27 February 1992 (aged 30)	4	1	(The Football Association) Newcastle United
25	MF	James Maddison	13 November 1996 (aged 26)	1	0	(The Football Association) Leicester City
26	MF	Conor Gallagher	6 February 2000 (aged 22)	4	0	(The Football Association) Chelsea

== 2024 European Championship ==
- Progress: Runners-up

Head coach: Gareth Southgate

The following 26 players were named in the final squad.

No.	Pos.	Player	Date of birth (age)	Caps	Goals	Club
1	GK	Jordan Pickford	7 March 1994 (aged 30)	61	0	(The Football Association) Everton
2	DF	Kyle Walker	28 May 1990 (aged 34)	83	1	(The Football Association) Manchester City
3	DF	Luke Shaw	12 July 1995 (aged 28)	31	3	(The Football Association) Manchester United
4	MF	Declan Rice	14 January 1999 (aged 25)	51	3	(The Football Association) Arsenal
5	DF	John Stones	28 May 1994 (aged 30)	72	3	(The Football Association) Manchester City
6	DF	Marc Guéhi	13 July 2000 (aged 23)	11	0	(The Football Association) Crystal Palace
7	FW	Bukayo Saka	5 September 2001 (aged 22)	33	11	(The Football Association) Arsenal
8	DF	Trent Alexander-Arnold	7 October 1998 (aged 25)	25	3	(The Football Association) Liverpool
9	FW	Harry Kane (captain)	28 July 1993 (aged 30)	91	63	(German Football Association) Bayern Munich
10	MF	Jude Bellingham	29 June 2003 (aged 20)	29	3	(Royal Spanish Football Federation) Real Madrid
11	MF	Phil Foden	28 May 2000 (aged 24)	34	4	(The Football Association) Manchester City
12	DF	Kieran Trippier	19 September 1990 (aged 33)	48	1	(The Football Association) Newcastle United
13	GK	Aaron Ramsdale	14 May 1998 (aged 26)	5	0	(The Football Association) Arsenal
14	DF	Ezri Konsa	23 October 1997 (aged 26)	4	0	(The Football Association) Aston Villa
15	DF	Lewis Dunk	21 November 1991 (aged 32)	6	0	(The Football Association) Brighton & Hove Albion
16	MF	Conor Gallagher	6 February 2000 (aged 24)	13	0	(The Football Association) Chelsea
17	FW	Ivan Toney	16 March 1996 (aged 28)	3	1	(The Football Association) Brentford
18	FW	Anthony Gordon	24 February 2001 (aged 23)	3	0	(The Football Association) Newcastle United
19	FW	Ollie Watkins	30 December 1995 (aged 28)	12	3	(The Football Association) Aston Villa
20	FW	Jarrod Bowen	20 December 1996 (aged 27)	8	0	(The Football Association) West Ham United
21	FW	Eberechi Eze	29 June 1998 (aged 25)	4	0	(The Football Association) Crystal Palace
22	DF	Joe Gomez	23 May 1997 (aged 27)	15	0	(The Football Association) Liverpool
23	GK	Dean Henderson	12 March 1997 (aged 27)	1	0	(The Football Association) Crystal Palace
24	MF	Cole Palmer	6 May 2002 (aged 22)	4	1	(The Football Association) Chelsea
25	MF	Adam Wharton	6 February 2004 (aged 20)	1	0	(The Football Association) Crystal Palace
26	MF	Kobbie Mainoo	19 April 2005 (aged 19)	3	0	(The Football Association) Manchester United

== 2026 World Cup ==
- Progress: Third place

Head coach: (Germany) Thomas Tuchel

England's final squad was announced on 22 May 2026. Tino Livramento withdrew injured and was replaced by Trevoh Chalobah on 16 June.

No.	Pos.	Player	Date of birth (age)	Caps	Goals	Club
1	GK	Jordan Pickford	7 March 1994 (aged 32)	84	0	(The Football Association) Everton
2	DF	Ezri Konsa	23 October 1997 (aged 28)	20	1	(The Football Association) Aston Villa
3	DF	Nico O'Reilly	12 March 2005 (aged 21)	5	0	(The Football Association) Manchester City
4	MF	Declan Rice	14 January 1999 (aged 27)	73	7	(The Football Association) Arsenal
5	DF	John Stones	28 May 1994 (aged 32)	89	3	(The Football Association) Manchester City
6	DF	Marc Guéhi	13 July 2000 (aged 25)	29	1	(The Football Association) Manchester City
7	FW	Bukayo Saka	5 September 2001 (aged 24)	49	14	(The Football Association) Arsenal
8	MF	Elliot Anderson	6 November 2002 (aged 23)	9	0	(The Football Association) Nottingham Forest
9	FW	Harry Kane (captain)	28 July 1993 (aged 32)	114	79	(German Football Association) Bayern Munich
10	MF	Jude Bellingham	29 June 2003 (aged 22)	48	6	(Royal Spanish Football Federation) Real Madrid
11	FW	Marcus Rashford	31 October 1997 (aged 28)	72	18	(Royal Spanish Football Federation) Barcelona
12	DF	Trevoh Chalobah	5 July 1999 (aged 26)	1	0	(The Football Association) Chelsea
13	GK	Dean Henderson	3 December 1997 (aged 28)	5	0	(The Football Association) Crystal Palace
14	MF	Jordan Henderson	17 June 1990 (aged 35)	90	3	(The Football Association) Brentford
15	DF	Dan Burn	9 May 1992 (aged 34)	8	0	(The Football Association) Newcastle United
16	MF	Kobbie Mainoo	19 April 2005 (aged 21)	14	0	(The Football Association) Manchester United
17	MF	Morgan Rogers	26 July 2002 (aged 23)	15	1	(The Football Association) Aston Villa
18	FW	Anthony Gordon	24 February 2001 (aged 25)	19	3	(The Football Association) Newcastle United
19	FW	Ollie Watkins	30 December 1995 (aged 30)	22	7	(The Football Association) Aston Villa
20	FW	Noni Madueke	10 March 2002 (aged 24)	11	1	(The Football Association) Arsenal
21	FW	Eberechi Eze	29 June 1998 (aged 27)	17	3	(The Football Association) Arsenal
22	FW	Ivan Toney	16 March 1996 (aged 30)	8	1	(Saudi Arabian Football Federation) Al-Ahli
23	GK	James Trafford	10 October 2002 (aged 23)	2	0	(The Football Association) Manchester City
24	DF	Reece James	12 August 1999 (aged 26)	24	1	(The Football Association) Chelsea
25	DF	Djed Spence	9 August 2000 (aged 25)	6	0	(The Football Association) Tottenham Hotspur
26	DF	Jarell Quansah	29 January 2003 (aged 23)	3	0	(German Football Association) Bayer Leverkusen

== See also ==
- England national football team results
- List of England international footballers (25 caps and over)
- England at the FIFA World Cup
- England at the UEFA European Championship
