= Ireland national football team =

Ireland national football team may refer to:

== Association football (soccer) ==
- Ireland national football team (1882–1950), the Irish Football Association's (IFA) original all-island team; first played in 1882
- Northern Ireland national football team, the successor to the original IFA team; sometimes played as "Ireland" until the 1970s
- Northern Ireland women's national football team
- Republic of Ireland national football team, the current Football Association of Ireland (FAI) team, previously played as "Irish Free State" and then "Ireland"; first played in 1926
- Republic of Ireland women's national football team
- Proposed all-Ireland football team

== Other sports ==
- Ireland international rules football team
- Irish national Australian rules football team
- Ireland national futsal team
- Ireland national rugby union team
- Ireland national rugby league team
