= England national football team results =

For lists of England national football team results see:

- England national football team results (1872–1899)
- England national football team results (1900–1929)
- England national football team results (1930–1959)
- England national football team results (1960–1979)
- England national football team results (1980–1999)
- England national football team results (2000–2019)
- England national football team results (2020–present)
- England national football team results (unofficial matches)
