= Bobby Turnbull =

English footballer

Robert Turnbull
Personal information
- Full name: Robert Turnbull
- Date of birth: 17 December 1895
- Place of birth: Middlesbrough, England
- Date of death: 18 March 1952 (aged 56)
- Height: 5 ft 8 in (1.73 m)
- Position: Outside right

Senior career*
Years	Team	Apps	(Gls)
1915-18	South Bank East End		
1918-1925	Bradford Park Avenue	207	(43)
1925-1932	Leeds United	204	(45)
1932	Rhyl Athletic		

International career
1919	England	1	(0)
- * Club domestic league appearances and goals

Robert Turnbull (17 December 1895 – 18 March 1952) was an English international footballer, who played as an outside right.

== Career ==
Born in Middlesbrough, Turnbull played professionally for Bradford Park Avenue, before joining Leeds United in 1925 and earned one cap for England in 1919.
