= Bert Batten =

English footballer

Personal information
- Full name: Herbert George Batten
- Date of birth: 14 May 1898
- Place of birth: Bristol, England
- Date of death: 1956 (aged 57–58)
- Position: Inside left

Senior career*
Years	Team	Apps	(Gls)
1920–1921	Bristol City		
1921–1926	Plymouth Argyle	88	(27)
1926	Everton	15	(1)
1926–1927	Bradford City	24	(5)
- Reading
- Clapton Orient
Total		127	(33)
- * Club domestic league appearances and goals

Herbert George Batten (14 May 1898 – 1956) was an English professional footballer who played as an inside left.

== Career ==
Born in Bristol, Batten played for Bristol City, Plymouth Argyle, Everton, Bradford City, Reading and Clapton Orient. For Plymouth Argyle, he made 88 appearances in the Football League; he also made 6 appearances in Cup competitions. For Everton, he made 15 appearances in the Football League. For Bradford City, he made 24 appearances in the Football League.

== Sources ==
- Frost, Terry (1988). Bradford City A Complete Record 1903-1988. Breedon Books Sport. ISBN 0-907969-38-0.
