= Bill Smith (footballer, born 1926) =

English footballer

Personal information
- Full name: William Henry Smith
- Date of birth: 7 September 1926
- Place of birth: Plymouth, England
- Date of death: December 2014 (aged 88)
- Place of death: Lancashire, England
- Height: 5 ft 11 in (1.80 m)
- Positions: Forward; wing half

Senior career*
Years	Team	Apps	(Gls)
- Royal Marines
1944–1945	Plymouth United		
1945–1947	Plymouth Argyle	0	(0)
1947–1948	Reading	3	(0)
1948–1950	Northampton Town	26	(6)
1950–1952	Birmingham City	55	(21)
1952–1960	Blackburn Rovers	119	(10)
1960–1962	Accrington Stanley	34	(3)

Managerial career
- 1961–1962: Accrington Stanley (caretaker manager)
- * Club domestic league appearances and goals

William Henry Smith (7 September 1926 – December 2014) was an English professional footballer born in Plymouth, Devon, who played as a forward or wing half. He made 237 appearances and scored 40 goals in the Football League playing for Reading, Northampton Town, Birmingham City, Blackburn Rovers and Accrington Stanley.

He contributed to Blackburn's promotion to the First Division in the 1957–58 season, before moving to Accrington Stanley as player-coach in 1960. Appointed joint caretaker manager with trainer Harry Hubbick in late 1961, he retired from football when Stanley resigned from the Football League in March 1962.
