= Gordon Hurst =

English footballer and manager

Personal information
- Date of birth: 9 October 1924
- Place of birth: Oldham, England
- Date of death: 1980 (aged 55–56)
- Position: Winger

Senior career*
Years	Team	Apps	(Gls)
1945–1946	Ramsgate Athletic		
1946–1958	Charlton Athletic	369	(75)
1958–1961	Tunbridge Wells United		

Managerial career
- 1958–1961: Tunbridge Wells United
- 1965–1966: Oldham Athletic
- * Club domestic league appearances and goals

Gordon Hurst (9 October 1924 – 1980) was an English footballer who played as a winger in the Football League. He moved from Non League Ramsgate Athletic to Charlton Athletic in 1946 where he stayed until 1957 playing in nearly 400 matches. In 1958 he joined Tunbridge Wells United as player manager and stayed there until 1961.

== Honours ==
Charlton Athletic

- FA Cup: 1946–47
