= England national football team results (2020–present) =

- Win Draw Loss

This article provides details of international football games played by the England national football team from 2020 to present.

== Results ==
=== 2020 ===
5 September 2020–21 UEFA Nations League A Group 2	Iceland	0–1	England	Reykjavík, Iceland
16:00 WET (UTC±0); Match 1,002	Ingason (red card) 89'	Report	Sterling 90+1' (pen.); Walker (red card) 70'	Stadium: Laugardalsvöllur; Attendance: 0 (Note: Due to the COVID-19 pandemic in Europe, all matches scheduled for September 2020 were played behind closed doors.); Referee: Srđan Jovanović (Serbia)

8 September 2020–21 UEFA Nations League A Group 2	Denmark	0–0	England	Copenhagen, Denmark
20:45 CEST (UTC+2); Match 1,003		Report		Stadium: Parken Stadium; Attendance: 0 Referee: István Kovács (Romania)

8 October International Friendly	England	3–0	Wales	London, England
20:00 BST; Match 1,004	Calvert-Lewin 26'; Coady 53'; Ings 63'	Report		Stadium: Wembley Stadium; Attendance: 0 (Note: Due to the COVID-19 pandemic in the United Kingdom, England played their home matches behind closed doors.); Referee: Bobby Madden (Scotland)

11 October 2020–21 UEFA Nations League A Group 2	England	2–1	Belgium	London, England
17:00 BST (UTC+1); Match 1,005	Rashford 39' (pen.); Mount 64'	Report	Lukaku 16' (pen.)	Stadium: Wembley Stadium; Attendance: 0 Referee: Tobias Stieler (Germany)

14 October 2020–21 UEFA Nations League A Group 2	England	0–1	Denmark	London, England
19:45 BST; Match 1,006	Maguire (red card) 32'; James (red card) 90+4'	Report	Eriksen 35' (pen.)	Stadium: Wembley Stadium; Attendance: 0 Referee: Jesús Gil Manzano (Spain)

12 November International Friendly	England	3–0	Republic of Ireland	London, England
20:00 GMT; Match 1,007	Maguire 18'; Sancho 31'; Calvert-Lewin 56' (pen.)	Report		Stadium: Wembley Stadium; Attendance: 0 Referee: Carlos del Cerro Grande (Spain)

15 November 2020–21 UEFA Nations League A Group 2	Belgium	2–0	England	Leuven, Belgium
20:45 CET (UTC+1); Match 1,008	Tielemans 10'; Mertens 23'	Report		Stadium: Den Dreef; Attendance: 0 Referee: Danny Makkelie (Netherlands)

18 November 2020–21 UEFA Nations League A Group 2	England	4–0	Iceland	London, England
19:45 GMT; Match 1,009	Rice 20'; Mount 24'; Foden 80', 84'	Report		Stadium: Wembley Stadium; Attendance: 0 Referee: Fábio Veríssimo (Portugal)

=== 2021 ===
25 March 2022 FIFA World Cup qualification Group I	England	5–0	San Marino	London, England
19:45 GMT; Match 1,010	Ward-Prowse 14'; Calvert-Lewin 21', 53'; Sterling 31'; Watkins 83'	Report		Stadium: Wembley Stadium; Attendance: 0 Referee: Kirill Levnikov (Russia)

28 March 2022 FIFA World Cup qualification Group I	Albania	0–2	England	Tirana, Albania
18:00 CEST (UTC+2); Match 1,011		Report	Kane 38'; Mount 63'	Stadium: Arena Kombëtare; Attendance: 0 Referee: Orel Grinfeld (Israel)

31 March 2022 FIFA World Cup qualification Group I	England	2–1	Poland	London, England
19:45 BST; Match 1,012	Kane 19' (pen.); Maguire 85'	Report	Moder 58'	Stadium: Wembley Stadium; Attendance: 0 Referee: Björn Kuipers (Netherlands)

2 June International Friendly	England	1–0	Austria	Middlesbrough, England
20:00 BST; Match 1,013	Saka 56'	Report		Stadium: Riverside Stadium; Attendance: 7,000 (Note: Due to the COVID-19 pandemic in the United Kingdom, the match was played in front of a reduced spectator capacity.); Referee: Lawrence Visser (Belgium)
Note: The match was originally scheduled for 2 June 2020 at Ernst-Happel-Stadion in Vienna, but was postponed due to the COVID-19 pandemic in Austria.

6 June International Friendly	England	1–0	Romania	Middlesbrough, England
17:00 BST; Match 1,014	Rashford 68' (pen.)	Report		Stadium: Riverside Stadium; Attendance: 6,952; Referee: Tiago Martins (Portugal)
Note: The match was originally scheduled for 7 June 2020 at Villa Park in Birmingham, but was postponed due to the COVID-19 pandemic in England.

13 June UEFA Euro 2020 Group D	England	1–0	Croatia	London, England
14:00 BST; Match 1,015	Sterling 57'	Report		Stadium: Wembley Stadium; Attendance: 18,497; Referee: Daniele Orsato (Italy)

18 June UEFA Euro 2020 Group D	England	0–0	Scotland	London, England
20:00 BST; Match 1,016		Report		Stadium: Wembley Stadium; Attendance: 20,306; Referee: Antonio Mateu Lahoz (Spain)

22 June UEFA Euro 2020 Group D	Czech Republic	0–1	England	London, England
20:00 BST; Match 1,017		Report	Sterling 12'	Stadium: Wembley Stadium; Attendance: 19,104; Referee: Artur Soares Dias (Portugal)

29 June UEFA Euro 2020 Round of 16	England	2–0	Germany	London, England
17:00 BST; Match 1,018	Sterling 75'; Kane 86'	Report		Stadium: Wembley Stadium; Attendance: 41,973; Referee: Danny Makkelie (Netherlands)

3 July UEFA Euro 2020 Quarter-final	Ukraine	0–4	England	Rome, Italy
21:00 CEST (UTC+2); Match 1,019		Report	Kane 4', 50'; Maguire 46'; J. Henderson 63'	Stadium: Stadio Olimpico; Attendance: 11,880; Referee: Felix Brych (Germany)

7 July UEFA Euro 2020 Semi-final	England	2–1 (a.e.t.)	Denmark	London, England
20:00 BST; Match 1,020	Kjær 39' (o.g.); Kane 104'	Report	Damsgaard 30'	Stadium: Wembley Stadium; Attendance: 64,950; Referee: Danny Makkelie (Netherlands)

11 July UEFA Euro 2020 Final	Italy	1–1 (a.e.t.) (3–2 p)	England	London, England
20:00 BST; Match 1,021	Bonucci 67'	Report	Shaw 2'	Stadium: Wembley Stadium; Attendance: 67,173; Referee: Björn Kuipers (Netherlands)
	Penalties
	Berardi (penalty scored); Belotti (penalty missed); Bonucci (penalty scored); Bernardeschi (penalty scored); Jorginho (penalty missed)		(penalty scored) Kane; (penalty scored) Maguire; (penalty missed) Rashford; (penalty missed) Sancho; (penalty missed) Saka

2 September 2022 FIFA World Cup qualification Group I	Hungary	0–4	England	Budapest, Hungary
20:45 CEST (UTC+2); Match 1,022		Report	Sterling 55'; Kane 63'; Maguire 69'; Rice 87'	Stadium: Puskás Aréna; Attendance: 58,260; Referee: Cüneyt Çakır (Turkey)

5 September 2022 FIFA World Cup qualification Group I	England	4–0	Andorra	London, England
17:00 BST (UTC+1); Match 1,023	Lingard 18', 78'; Kane 72' (pen.); Saka 85'	Report		Stadium: Wembley Stadium; Attendance: 67,171; Referee: Anastasios Papapetrou (Greece)

8 September 2022 FIFA World Cup qualification Group I	Poland	1–1	England	Warsaw, Poland
20:45 CEST (UTC+2); Match 1,024	Szymański 90+2'	Report	Kane 72'	Stadium: PGE Narodowy; Attendance: 56,212; Referee: Daniel Siebert (Germany)

9 October 2022 FIFA World Cup qualification Group I	Andorra	0–5	England	Andorra la Vella, Andorra
20:45 CEST (UTC+2); Match 1,025		Report	Chilwell 17'; Saka 40'; Abraham 59'; Ward-Prowse 79'; Grealish 86'	Stadium: Estadi Nacional; Attendance: 2,285; Referee: Kateryna Monzul (Ukraine)

12 October 2022 FIFA World Cup qualification Group I	England	1–1	Hungary	London, England
19:45 BST (UTC+1); Match 1,026	Stones 37'	Report	Sallai 24' (pen.)	Stadium: Wembley Stadium; Attendance: 69,380; Referee: Alejandro Hernández (Spain)

12 November 2022 FIFA World Cup qualification Group I	England	5–0	Albania	London, England
19:45 GMT; Match 1,027	Maguire 9'; Kane 18', 33', 45+2'; Henderson 28'	Report		Stadium: Wembley Stadium; Attendance: 80,366; Referee: Ruddy Buquet (France)

15 November 2022 FIFA World Cup qualification Group I	San Marino	0–10	England	Serravalle, San Marino
20:45 CET (UTC+1); Match 1,028	Rossi (red card) 67'	Report	Maguire 6'; Fabbri 15' (o.g.); Kane 27' (pen.), 32', 39' (pen.), 42'; Smith Rowe 58'; Mings 69'; Abraham 78'; Saka 80'	Stadium: Stadio Olimpico; Attendance: 2,775; Referee: Rade Obrenovič (Slovenia)

=== 2022 ===
26 March International Friendly	England	2–1	Switzerland	London, England
17:30 GMT; Match 1,029	Shaw 45+1'; Kane 78' (pen.)	Report	Embolo 22'	Stadium: Wembley Stadium; Attendance: 78,881; Referee: Andreas Ekberg (Sweden)

29 March International Friendly	England	3–0	Ivory Coast	London, England
19:45 BST; Match 1,030	Watkins 30'; Sterling 45'; Mings 90+3'	Report	Aurier (red card) 40'	Stadium: Wembley Stadium; Attendance: 73,405; Referee: Erik Lambrechts (Belgium)

4 June 2022–23 UEFA Nations League A Group 3	Hungary	1–0	England	Budapest, Hungary
18:00 CEST (UTC+2); Match 1,031	Szoboszlai 66' (pen.)	Report		Stadium: Puskás Aréna; Attendance: 26,935; Referee: Artur Dias (Portugal)

7 June 2022–23 UEFA Nations League A Group 3	Germany	1–1	England	Munich, Germany
20:45 CEST (UTC+2); Match 1,032	Hofmann 50'	Report	Kane 88' (pen.)	Stadium: Allianz Arena; Attendance: 66,289; Referee: Carlos del Cerro Grande (Spain)

11 June 2022–23 UEFA Nations League A Group 3	England	0–0	Italy	Wolverhampton, England
19:45 BST; Match 1,033		Report		Stadium: Molineux Stadium; Attendance: 1,782; Referee: Szymon Marciniak (Poland)

14 June 2022–23 UEFA Nations League A Group 3	England	0–4	Hungary	Wolverhampton, England
19:45 BST; Match 1,034	Stones (red card) 82'	Report	Sallai 16', 70'; Z. Nagy 80'; Gazdag 89'	Stadium: Molineux Stadium; Attendance: 28,839; Referee: Clément Turpin (France)

23 September 2022–23 UEFA Nations League A Group 3	Italy	1–0	England	Milan, Italy
20:45 CEST (UTC+2); Match 1,035	Raspadori 68'	Report		Stadium: San Siro; Attendance: 50,640; Referee: Jesús Gil Manzano (Spain)

26 September 2022–23 UEFA Nations League A Group 3	England	3–3	Germany	London, England
19:45 BST; Match 1,036	Shaw 72'; Mount 75'; Kane 83' (pen.)	Report	Gündoğan 52' (pen.); Havertz 67', 87'	Stadium: Wembley Stadium; Attendance: 78,949; Referee: Danny Makkelie (Netherlands)

21 November 2022 FIFA World Cup Group B	England	6–2	Iran	Al Rayyan, Qatar
16:00 AST (UTC+3); Match 1,037	Bellingham 35'; Saka 43', 62'; Sterling 45+1'; Rashford 71'; Grealish 90'	Report	Taremi 65', 90+13' (pen.)	Stadium: Khalifa International Stadium; Attendance: 45,334; Referee: Raphael Claus (Brazil)

25 November 2022 FIFA World Cup Group B	England	0–0	United States	Al Khor, Qatar
22:00 AST (UTC+3); Match 1,038		Report		Stadium: Al Bayt Stadium; Attendance: 68,463; Referee: Jesús Valenzuela (Venezuela)

29 November 2022 FIFA World Cup Group B	Wales	0–3	England	Al Rayyan, Qatar
22:00 AST (UTC+3); Match 1,039		Report	Rashford 50', 68'; Foden 51'	Stadium: Ahmad bin Ali Stadium; Attendance: 44,297; Referee: Slavko Vinčić (Slovenia)

4 December 2022 FIFA World Cup Round of 16	England	3–0	Senegal	Al Khor, Qatar
22:00 AST (UTC+3); Match 1,040	Henderson 38'; Kane 45+3'; Saka 57'	Report		Stadium: Al Bayt Stadium; Attendance: 65,985; Referee: Iván Barton (El Salvador)

10 December 2022 FIFA World Cup Quarter-final	England	1–2	France	Al Khor, Qatar
22:00 AST (UTC+3); Match 1,041	Kane 54' (pen.)	Report	Tchouaméni 17'; Giroud 78'	Stadium: Al Bayt Stadium; Attendance: 68,895; Referee: Wilton Sampaio (Brazil)

=== 2023 ===
23 March UEFA Euro 2024 qualifying Group C	Italy	1–2	England	Naples, Italy
20:45 CET (UTC+1); Match 1,042	Retegui 56'	Report	Rice 13'; Kane 44' (pen.); Shaw (red card) 80'	Stadium: Stadio Diego Armando Maradona; Attendance: 44,536; Referee: Srđan Jovanović (Serbia)

26 March UEFA Euro 2024 qualifying Group C	England	2–0	Ukraine	London, England
17:00 BST; Match 1,043	Kane 37'; Saka 40'	Report		Stadium: Wembley Stadium; Attendance: 83,947; Referee: Serdar Gözübüyük (Netherlands)

16 June UEFA Euro 2024 qualifying Group C	Malta	0–4	England	Ta' Qali, Malta
20:45 CEST (UTC+2); Match 1,044		Report	Apap 8' (o.g.); Alexander-Arnold 28'; Kane 31' (pen.); Wilson 83' (pen.)	Stadium: National Stadium; Attendance: 16,277; Referee: Igor Pajac (Croatia)

19 June UEFA Euro 2024 qualifying Group C	England	7–0	North Macedonia	Manchester, England
19:45 BST; Match 1,045	Kane 29', 73' (pen.); Saka 38', 47', 51'; Rashford 45'; Phillips 64'	Report		Stadium: Old Trafford; Attendance: 70,708; Referee: István Kovács (Romania)

9 September UEFA Euro 2024 qualifying Group C	Ukraine	1–1	England	Wrocław, Poland
18:00 CEST (UTC+2); Match 1,046	Zinchenko 26'	Report	Walker 41'	Stadium: Stadion Wrocław; Attendance: 39,000; Referee: Georgi Kabakov (Bulgaria)

12 September 150th Anniversary Heritage Match	Scotland	1–3	England	Glasgow, Scotland
19:45 BST; Match 1,047	Maguire 67' (o.g.)	Report	Foden 32'; Bellingham 35'; Kane 81'	Stadium: Hampden Park; Attendance: 51,000; Referee: Davide Massa (Italy)

13 October International Friendly	England	1–0	Australia	London, England
19:45 BST; Match 1,048	Watkins 57'	Report		Stadium: Wembley Stadium; Attendance: 81,116; Referee: Stéphanie Frappart (France)

17 October UEFA Euro 2024 qualifying Group C	England	3–1	Italy	London, England
19:45 BST; Match 1,049	Kane 32' (pen.), 77'; Rashford 57'	Report	Scamacca 15'	Stadium: Wembley Stadium; Attendance: 83,194; Referee: Clément Turpin (France)

17 November UEFA Euro 2024 qualifying Group C	England	2–0	Malta	London, England
19:45 GMT; Match 1,050	Pepe 8' (o.g.); Kane 75'	Report		Stadium: Wembley Stadium; Attendance: 81,388; Referee: Luis Godinho (Portugal)

20 November UEFA Euro 2024 qualifying Group C	North Macedonia	1–1	England	Skopje, North Macedonia
20:45 CET; Match 1,051	Bardhi 41'	Report	Atanasov 59' (o.g.)	Stadium: Toše Proeski Arena; Attendance: 27,982; Referee: Filip Glova (Slovakia)

=== 2024 ===
23 March International Friendly	England	0–1	Brazil	London, England
19:00 GMT; Match 1,052		Report	Endrick 80'	Stadium: Wembley Stadium; Attendance: 83,664; Referee: Artur Soares Dias (Portugal)

26 March International Friendly	England	2–2	Belgium	London, England
19:45 GMT; Match 1,053	Toney 17' (pen.); Bellingham 90+5'	Report	Tielemans 11', 36'	Stadium: Wembley Stadium; Attendance: 80,733; Referee: Sebastian Gishamer (Austria)

3 June International Friendly	England	3–0	Bosnia and Herzegovina	Newcastle upon Tyne, England
19:45 BST; Match 1,054	Palmer 60' (pen.); Alexander-Arnold 85'; Kane 89'	Report		Stadium: St James' Park; Attendance: 50,061; Referee: Rohit Saggi (Norway)

7 June International Friendly	England	0–1	Iceland	London, England
19:45 BST; Match 1,055		Report	Þorsteinsson 12'	Stadium: Wembley Stadium; Attendance: 81,410; Referee: Davide Massa (Italy)

16 June UEFA Euro 2024 Group C	Serbia	0–1	England	Gelsenkirchen, Germany
21:00 CEST (UTC+2); Match 1,056		Report	Bellingham 13'	Stadium: Arena AufSchalke; Attendance: 48,953; Referee: Daniele Orsato (Italy)

20 June UEFA Euro 2024 Group C	Denmark	1–1	England	Frankfurt, Germany
18:00 CEST (UTC+2); Match 1,057	Hjulmand 34'	Report	Kane 18'	Stadium: Waldstadion; Attendance: 46,177; Referee: Artur Soares Dias (Portugal)

25 June UEFA Euro 2024 Group C	England	0–0	Slovenia	Cologne, Germany
21:00 CEST (UTC+2); Match 1,058		Report		Stadium: RheinEnergieStadion; Attendance: 41,536; Referee: Clément Turpin (France)

30 June UEFA Euro 2024 Round of 16	England	2–1 (a.e.t.)	Slovakia	Gelsenkirchen, Germany
18:00 CEST (UTC+2); Match 1,059	Bellingham 90+5'; Kane 91'	Report	Schranz 25'	Stadium: Arena AufSchalke; Attendance: 47,244; Referee: Halil Umut Meler (Turkey)

6 July UEFA Euro 2024 Quarter-final	England	1–1 (a.e.t.) (5–3 p)	Switzerland	Düsseldorf, Germany
18:00 CEST (UTC+2); Match 1,060	Saka 80'	Report	Embolo 75'	Stadium: Merkur Spiel-Arena; Attendance: 46,907; Referee: Daniele Orsato (Italy)
	Penalties
	Palmer (penalty scored); Bellingham (penalty scored); Saka (penalty scored); Toney (penalty scored); Alexander-Arnold (penalty scored)		(penalty missed) Akanji; (penalty scored) Schär; (penalty scored) Shaqiri; (penalty scored) Amdouni

10 July UEFA Euro 2024 Semi-final	Netherlands	1–2	England	Dortmund, Germany
21:00 CEST (UTC+2); Match 1,061	Simons 7'	Report	Kane 18' (pen.); Watkins 90'	Stadium: Westfalenstadion; Attendance: 60,926; Referee: Felix Zwayer (Germany)

14 July UEFA Euro 2024 Final	Spain	2–1	England	Berlin, Germany
21:00 CEST (UTC+2); Match 1,062	Williams 47'; Oyarzabal 86'	Report	Palmer 73'	Stadium: Olympiastadion; Attendance: 65,600; Referee: François Letexier (France)

7 September 2024–25 UEFA Nations League B Group 2	Republic of Ireland	0–2	England	Dublin, Republic of Ireland
17:00 BST; Match 1,063		Report	Rice 11'; Grealish 26'	Stadium: Aviva Stadium; Attendance: 50,359; Referee: José María Sánchez (Spain)

10 September 2024–25 UEFA Nations League B Group 2	England	2–0	Finland	London, England
19:45 BST; Match 1,064	Kane 57', 76'	Report		Stadium: Wembley Stadium; Attendance: 70,221; Referee: Morten Krogh (Denmark)

10 October 2024–25 UEFA Nations League B Group 2	England	1–2	Greece	London, England
19:45 BST; Match 1,065	Bellingham 87'	Report	Pavlidis 49', 90+4'	Stadium: Wembley Stadium; Attendance: 79,012; Referee: Andrea Colombo (Italy)

13 October 2024–25 UEFA Nations League B Group 2	Finland	1–3	England	Helsinki, Finland
19:00 EEST (UTC+3); Match 1,066	Hoskonen 87'	Report	Grealish 18'; Alexander-Arnold 74'; Rice 84'	Stadium: Helsinki Olympic Stadium; Attendance: 32,411; Referee: Giorgi Kruashvili (Georgia)

14 November 2024–25 UEFA Nations League B Group 2	Greece	0–3	England	Athens, Greece
21:45 EET (UTC+2); Match 1,067		Report	Watkins 7'; Vlachodimos 78' (o.g.); Jones 83'	Stadium: Olympic Stadium; Attendance: 60,664; Referee: Daniel Siebert (Germany)

17 November 2024–25 UEFA Nations League B Group 2	England	5–0	Republic of Ireland	London, England
17:00 GMT; Match 1,068	Kane 53' (pen.); Gordon 55'; Gallagher 58'; Bowen 76'; Harwood-Bellis 79'	Report	Scales (red card) 51'	Stadium: Wembley Stadium; Attendance: 79,969; Referee: Erik Lambrechts (Belgium)

=== 2025 ===
21 March 2026 FIFA World Cup qualification Group K	England	2–0	Albania	London, England
19:45 GMT (UTC±0); Match 1,069	Lewis-Skelly 20'; Kane 77'	Report		Stadium: Wembley Stadium; Attendance: 82,378; Referee: Alejandro Hernández Hernández (Spain)

24 March 2026 FIFA World Cup qualification Group K	England	3–0	Latvia	London, England
19:45 GMT (UTC±0); Match 1,070	James 38'; Kane 68'; Eze 76'	Report		Stadium: Wembley Stadium; Attendance: 79,572; Referee: Orel Grinfeld (Israel)

7 June 2026 FIFA World Cup qualification Group K	Andorra	0–1	England	Barcelona, Spain
18:00 CEST (UTC+2); Match 1,071		Report	Kane 50'	Stadium: RCDE Stadium; Attendance: 8,872; Referee: Igor Pajač (Croatia)

10 June International Friendly	England	1–3	Senegal	Nottingham, England
19:45 BST; Match 1,072	Kane 7'	Report	Sarr 40'; Diarra 62'; Sabaly 90+3'	Stadium: City Ground; Attendance: 26,322; Referee: Stéphanie Frappart (France)

6 September 2026 FIFA World Cup qualification Group K	England	2–0	Andorra	Birmingham, England
17:00 BST; Match 1,073	García 25' (o.g.); Rice 67'	Report		Stadium: Villa Park; Attendance: 39,202; Referee: Mohammad Al-Emara (Finland)

9 September 2026 FIFA World Cup qualification Group K	Serbia	0–5	England	Belgrade, Serbia
20:45 CEST (UTC+2); Match 1,074	Milenković (red card) 72'	Report	Kane 33'; Madueke 35'; Konsa 52'; Guéhi 75'; Rashford 90' (pen.)	Stadium: Red Star Stadium; Attendance: 39,789; Referee: Clément Turpin (France)

9 October International Friendly	England	3–0	Wales	London, England
19:45 BST; Match 1,075	Rogers 3'; Watkins 11'; Saka 20'	Report		Stadium: Wembley Stadium; Attendance: 78,126; Referee: Urs Schnyder (Switzerland)

14 October 2026 FIFA World Cup qualification Group K	Latvia	0–5	England	Riga, Latvia
21:45 EEST (UTC+3); Match 1,076		Report	Gordon 26'; Kane 44', 45+3' (pen.); Toņiševs 58' (o.g.); Eze 86'	Stadium: Daugava Stadium; Attendance: 10,404; Referee: Tasos Sidiropoulos (Greece)

13 November 2026 FIFA World Cup qualification Group K	England	2–0	Serbia	London, England
19:45 GMT (UTC±0); Match 1,077	Saka 28'; Eze 90'	Report		Stadium: Wembley Stadium; Attendance: 74,289; Referee: Ivan Kružliak (Slovakia)

16 November 2026 FIFA World Cup qualification Group K	Albania	0–2	England	Tirana, Albania
18:00 CET (UTC+1); Match 1,078		Report	Kane 74', 82'	Stadium: Arena Kombëtare; Attendance: 21,459; Referee: Marco Guida (Italy)

=== 2026 ===
27 March International Friendly	England	1–1	Uruguay	London, England
19:45 GMT (UTC+00:00); Match 1,079	White 81'	Report	Valverde 90+4' (pen.)	Stadium: Wembley Stadium; Attendance: 80,581; Referee: Sven Jablonski (Germany)

31 March International Friendly	England	0–1	Japan	London, England
19:45 BST (UTC+01:00); Match 1,080		Report	Mitoma 23'	Stadium: Wembley Stadium; Attendance: 79,233; Referee: Nick Walsh (Scotland)

6 June International Friendly	England	1–0	New Zealand	Tampa, Florida, United States
16:00 EDT (UTC−04:00); Match 1,081	Kane 45+2'	Report		Stadium: Raymond James Stadium; Attendance: 25,899; Referee: Natalie Simon (United States)

10 June International Friendly	England	3–0	Costa Rica	Orlando, Florida, United States
17:00 EDT (UTC−04:00); Match 1,082	Rice 9'; Gordon 68' (pen.); Watkins 87'	Report		Stadium: Inter&Co Stadium; Attendance: 25,500; Referee: Katja Koroleva (United States)

17 June 2026 FIFA World Cup Group L	England	4–2	Croatia	Arlington, Texas, United States
15:00 CDT (UTC−05:00); Match 1,083	Kane 12' (pen.), 42'; Bellingham 47'; Rashford 85'	Report	Baturina 36'; Musa 45+5'	Stadium: AT&T Stadium; Attendance: 70,389; Referee: Clément Turpin (France)

23 June 2026 FIFA World Cup Group L	England	0–0	Ghana	Foxborough, Massachusetts, United States
16:00 EDT (UTC−04:00); Match 1,084		Report		Stadium: Gillette Stadium; Attendance: 63,983; Referee: Saíd Martínez (Honduras)

27 June 2026 FIFA World Cup Group L	Panama	0–2	England	East Rutherford, New Jersey, United States
17:00 EDT (UTC−04:00); Match 1,085		Report	Bellingham 62'; Kane 67'	Stadium: MetLife Stadium; Attendance: 80,663; Referee: Abdulrahman Al-Jassim (Qatar)

1 July 2026 FIFA World Cup Round of 32	England	2–1	DR Congo	Atlanta, Georgia, United States
12:00 EDT (UTC−04:00); Match 1,086	Kane 75', 86'	Report	Cipenga 7'	Stadium: Mercedes-Benz Stadium; Attendance: 68,239; Referee: Adham Makhadmeh (Jordan)

5 July 2026 FIFA World Cup Round of 16	Mexico	2–3	England	Mexico City, Mexico
19:00 CST (UTC-06:00); Match 1,087	Quiñones 42'; Jiménez 69' (pen.)	Report	Bellingham 36', 38'; Quansah (red card) 54'; Kane 60' (pen.)	Stadium: Estadio Azteca; Attendance: 80,824; Referee: Alireza Faghani (Australia)

11 July 2026 FIFA World Cup Quarter-final	Norway	1–2 (a.e.t.)	England	Miami Gardens, Florida, United States
17:00 EDT (UTC-04:00); Match 1,088	Schjelderup 36'	Report	Bellingham 45+2', 93'	Stadium: Hard Rock Stadium; Attendance: 64,478; Referee: Clément Turpin (France)

15 July 2026 FIFA World Cup Semi-final	England	1–2	Argentina	Atlanta, Georgia, United States
15:00 EDT (UTC-04:00); Match 1,089	Gordon 55'	Report	Fernández 85'; La. Martínez 90+2'	Stadium: Mercedes-Benz Stadium; Attendance: 68,239; Referee: Ismail Elfath (United States)

18 July 2026 FIFA World Cup Third place	France	4–6	England	Miami Gardens, Florida, United States
17:00 EDT (UTC-04:00); Match 1,090	Mbappé 48', 66'; Barcola 54'; Dembele 90+6'	Report	Rice 3'; Konsa 18'; Saka 37', 45+1', 87' (pen.); Bellingham 90+8'	Stadium: Hard Rock Stadium; Attendance: 64,478; Referee: Jesús Valenzuela (Venezuela)

26 September 2026–27 UEFA Nations League A Group 3	England	2–3	Spain	London, England
19:45 BST (UTC+01:00); Match 1,091	Gordon 36'; Kane 40'	Report	Yamal 2'; Baena 60'; Oyarzabal 74'	Stadium: Wembley Stadium; Attendance: 84,525; Referee: Davide Massa (Italy)

29 September 2026–27 UEFA Nations League A Group 3	Czech Republic	0–2	England	Prague, Czech Republic
20:45 CEST (UTC+02:00); Match 1,092	Šulc (red card) 25'	Report	Gordon 47'; Kane 69'	Stadium: Fortuna Arena; Attendance: 18,930; Referee: Halil Umut Meler (Turkey)

3 October 2026–27 UEFA Nations League A Group 3	Croatia	0–7	England	Rijeka, Croatia
18:00 CEST (UTC+02:00); Match 1,093		Report	Kane 8', 53'; Bellingham 21'; Gordon 39'; Saka 45', 68'; Rogers 87'	Stadium: Stadion Rujevica; Attendance: 6,342; Referee: Sven Jablonski (Germany)

6 October 2026–27 UEFA Nations League A Group 3	England	3–0	Czech Republic	London, England
19:45 BST (UTC+01:00); Match 1,094	Coufal 27' (o.g.); Kane 40', 57'	Report		Stadium: Wembley Stadium; Attendance: 78,864; Referee: Serdar Gözübüyük (Netherlands)

12 November 2026–27 UEFA Nations League A Group 3	England	2–1	Croatia	London, England
19:45 GMT (UTC+00:00); Match 1,095	Rogers 24'; Kane 64' (pen.)	Report	Sučić 59'	Stadium: Wembley Stadium; Attendance: 80,484; Referee: Morten Krogh (Denmark)

15 November 2026–27 UEFA Nations League A Group 3	Spain	2–3	England	Madrid, Spain
20:45 CET (UTC+01:00); Match 1,096	Oyarzabal 65' (pen.); Williams 75'	Report	Kane 45' (pen.); Konsa 53'; White 57'; Anderson (red card) 63'	Stadium: Metropolitano Stadium; Attendance: 63,788; Referee: Clément Turpin (France)

=== 2027 ===
27 March 2026–27 UEFA Nations League Quarter-final 1st leg	Norway	v	England	Oslo, Norway
18:00 CET (UTC+01:00); Match 1,097		Report		Stadium: Ullevaal Stadion

30 March 2026–27 UEFA Nations League Quarter-final 2nd leg	England	v	Norway	London, England
19:45 GMT (UTC+00:00); Match 1,098		Report		Stadium: Wembley Stadium

== Head to head records ==
As of matches played 3 October 2026

Head to head records
Opponent	Pld	W	D	L	GF	GA	W%	D%	L%
Albania	4	4	0	0	11	0	100	0	0
Andorra	4	4	0	0	12	0	100	0	0
Argentina	1	0	0	1	1	2	0	0	100
Australia	1	1	0	0	1	0	100	0	0
Austria	1	1	0	0	1	0	100	0	0
Belgium	3	1	1	1	4	5	33.33	33.33	33.33
Bosnia and Herzegovina	1	1	0	0	3	0	100	0	0
Brazil	1	0	0	1	0	1	0	0	100
Costa Rica	1	1	0	0	3	0	100	0	0
Croatia	3	3	0	0	12	2	100	0	0
Czech Republic	2	2	0	0	3	0	100	0	0
Denmark	4	1	2	1	3	3	25	50	25
DR Congo	1	1	0	0	2	1	100	0	0
Finland	2	2	0	0	5	1	100	0	0
France	2	1	0	1	7	6	50	0	50
Germany	3	1	2	0	6	4	33.33	66.67	0
Ghana	1	0	1	0	0	0	0	100	0
Greece	2	1	0	1	4	2	50	0	50
Hungary	4	1	1	2	5	6	25	25	50
Republic of Ireland	3	3	0	0	10	0	100	0	0
Iceland	3	2	0	1	5	1	66.67	0	33.33
Iran	1	1	0	0	6	2	100	0	0
Italy	5	2	2	1	6	4	40	40	20
Ivory Coast	1	1	0	0	3	0	100	0	0
Japan	1	0	0	1	0	1	0	0	100
Latvia	2	2	0	0	8	0	100	0	0
Malta	2	2	0	0	6	0	100	0	0
Mexico	1	1	0	0	3	2	100	0	0
Netherlands	1	1	0	0	2	1	100	0	0
New Zealand	1	1	0	0	1	0	100	0	0
North Macedonia	2	1	1	0	8	1	50	50	0
Norway	1	1	0	0	2	1	100	0	0
Panama	1	1	0	0	2	0	100	0	0
Poland	2	1	1	0	3	2	50	50	0
Romania	1	1	0	0	1	0	100	0	0
San Marino	2	2	0	0	15	0	100	0	0
Scotland	2	1	1	0	3	1	50	50	0
Senegal	2	1	0	1	4	3	50	0	50
Serbia	3	3	0	0	8	0	100	0	0
Slovakia	1	1	0	0	2	1	100	0	0
Slovenia	1	0	1	0	0	0	0	100	0
Spain	2	0	0	2	3	5	0	0	100
Switzerland	2	1	1	0	3	2	50	50	0
Ukraine	3	2	1	0	7	1	66.67	33.33	0
United States	1	0	1	0	0	0	0	100	0
Uruguay	1	0	1	0	1	1	0	100	0
Wales	3	3	0	0	9	0	100	0	0
Totals	92	61	17	14	204	62	66.3	18.48	15.22
