= Proposed all-Ireland football team =

Team for the whole island of Ireland

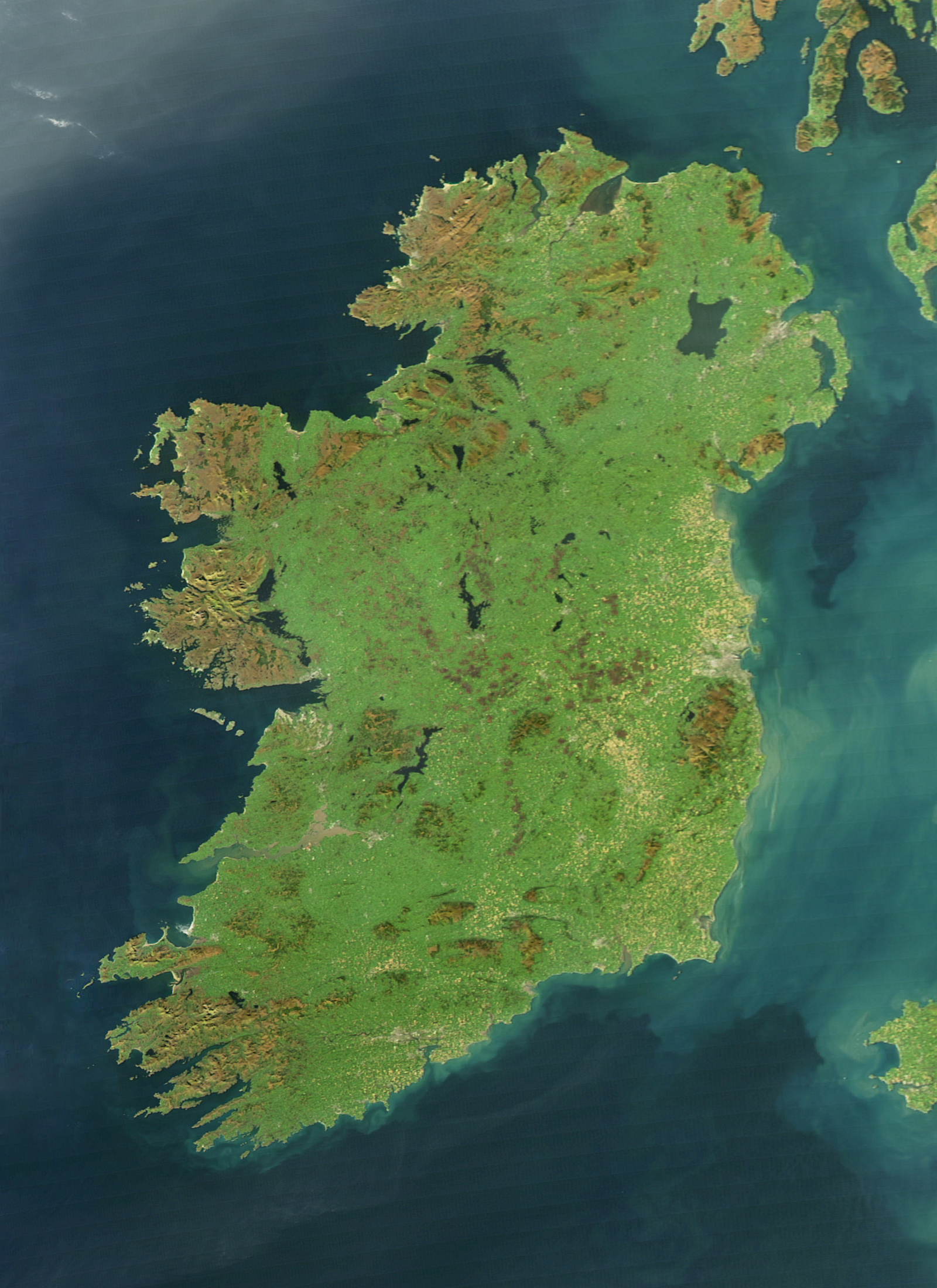
- The island of Ireland.
- Status: Ongoing

Location
- Region: Ireland

Sport information
- Sport: Football

An all-Ireland football team has been proposed on several occasions as a national representative association football team for the whole island of Ireland, an island which is politically divided into Northern Ireland and the Republic of Ireland and which currently has two separate teams.

== History ==
Ireland had its own national football team from 1882 onwards, administered by the Irish Football Association (IFA) which had been founded in 1880. It was the fourth oldest international football team in the world, and represented Ireland in international fixtures regularly, most frequently in the British Home Championship against England, Scotland and Wales. The four teams were collectively referred to as the "home nations", and jointly founded the International Football Association Board (IFAB) which drafted the Laws of the Game. The situation became complicated during the 1920s, due to poor relations between the national IFA leadership in Belfast and the Dublin-based Leinster Football Association (LFA) which oversaw the game in the eastern province of Leinster. The LFA alleged the IFA was biased towards the northern province of Ulster over the rest of the island. A critical dispute arose when an Irish Cup semi-final replay was moved to Belfast instead of Dublin. This culminated in a rival football association, the Football Association of Ireland (FAI), which emerged in Dublin in 1921 and organised a separate league and later a national team.

In the background, political upheavals related to the Irish War of Independence saw most of the island gain independence from the United Kingdom as the Irish Free State, later to become the Republic of Ireland. The north-eastern part of the island (including Belfast, where the IFA was headquartered) remained within the United Kingdom as Northern Ireland.

In 1923, during a period when the four home nations had dis-affiliated from FIFA, the FAI was recognised by FIFA as the governing body of the Irish Free State on the condition that it changed its name to the Football Association of the Irish Free State. At the same time, the IFA continued to organise its national team on an all-Ireland basis, regularly calling up Free State players. During this era at least one Northerner, Harry Chatton, also played for the Irish Free State and from 1936, the FAI began to organise their own all–Ireland team. Both teams now competed as Ireland and during this era at least 39 dual internationals were selected to represent both teams. In an era when national teams played only a few games a year, it was rare for professional players to turn down an opportunity to play at international level.

Between 1928 and 1946 the IFA were not affiliated to FIFA and the two Ireland teams co-existed, never competing in the same competition. Only in 1949 would both participate in the qualifying tournament for the 1950 World Cup. Four players – Tom Aherne, Reg Ryan, Davy Walsh, Con Martin – actually played for the two different teams in the same FIFA World Cup tournament. FIFA's response was to restrict the eligibility of players on the basis of the (political) border, further ruling in 1953 that neither team could be referred to as Ireland in competitions which both teams were eligible to enter; i.e., initially the FIFA World Cup and subsequently the European Nations Cup (now the UEFA European Football Championship). FIFA decreed that the FAI team officially be called the Republic of Ireland while the IFA team was to be named Northern Ireland.

=== Attempts at reunification ===
In the 1920s and early 1930s a number of meetings were held between the FAI and the IFA but without coming to an agreement. As time went on relations between the two bodies improved, but further discussions were put on hold due to the outbreak of The Troubles. Harry Cavan, a former president of the IFA, once commented that if it were not for The Troubles there would have eventually been an agreement between the FAI and the IFA.

== Support ==
Former footballer George Best called for a united Ireland football team on multiple occasions.

Former Republic of Ireland players Johnny Giles and Eamon Dunphy have voiced support for one. Northern Ireland footballers George Best, Derek Dougan and Pat Jennings were also supporters of the idea

Both Fianna Fáil and Fine Gael have voiced support for an all-Ireland football team. Sinn Féin have also called for an all-Ireland team stating "Irish sports teams are stronger and better when they are all-Ireland teams" In 2015 an opinion poll conducted by the University of Ulster found that 54% of those asked that were from Northern Ireland would support an All-Ireland team. 70% of Catholics supported the proposal and 39% of Protestants supported the proposal.

In 2017 research done by Amarach Research found that out of those asked (from the Republic of Ireland) 73% would support such a team, 18% would oppose one and 9% did not know

== See also ==
- Ireland national football team (1882–1950) the all-Ireland football team organised by the IFA
