= List of Celtic F.C. international footballers =

This is a list of players, past and present, who have been capped by their country in international football whilst playing and before or after for Celtic Football Club. As well as Scotland, 46 other nations have fielded Celtic players in their international sides.

== Albania ==
Albania

- Rudi Vata

== Australia ==
Australia

- Aaron Mooy
- Daniel Arzani
- Scott McDonald
- Tom Rogic
- Danny Milosevic
- Mark Viduka
- Marco Tilio
- Jackson Irvine
- Liam Bonetig

== Austria ==
Austria

- Moritz Bauer
- Junior Adamu

== Argentina ==
Argentina

- Alexandro Bernabei

== Belgium ==
Belgium

- Dedryck Boyata
- Jason Denayer
- Joos Valgaeren
- Arne Engels
- Logan Bailly
- Charly Musonda
- Boli Bolingoli

== Bulgaria ==
Bulgaria

- Stiliyan Petrov
- Aleksandar Tonev
- Tomislav Pavlov

== Brazil ==
Brazil

- Juninho
- Rafael Scheidt

== Bosnia and Herzegovina ==
Bosnia and Herzegovina

- Bahrudin Atajić

== Cameroon ==
Cameroon

- Landry N'Guémo
- Olivier Ntcham
- Jean-Joël Perrier-Doumbé

== Canada ==
Canada

- Alistair Johnston
- Joe Kennaway
- Jacob Lensky

== China ==
China

- Du Wei
- Zheng Zhi

== Croatia ==
Croatia

- Josip Juranović
- Jozo Šimunović
- Filip Benković

== Costa Rica ==
Costa Rica

- Cristian Gamboa

== Colombia ==
Colombia

- Camilo Durán

== Czech Republic ==
Czech Republic

- Jiří Jarošík
- Milan Mišůn
- Filip Twardzik
- Patrik Twardzik
- Tomáš Čvančara

== Denmark ==
Denmark

- Kasper Høgh
- Oliver Sørensen
- Oliver Abildgaard
- Thomas Gravesen
- Ulrik Laursen
- Matt O'Riley
- Morten Rasmussen
- Marc Rieper
- Kasper Schmeichel
- Erik Sviatchenko
- Morten Wieghorst

== Democratic Republic of Congo ==
DR Congo

- Michel-Ange Balikwisha
- Youssouf Mulumbu

== England ==
England

- Fraser Forster
- Steve Guppy
- Lee Martin
- Kelvin Wilson
- Patrick Roberts
- Tyler Blackett
- Andre Blackman
- Alan Stubbs
- Martin Hayes
- Michael Gray
- Alan Thompson
- Joe Hart
- Tony Warner
- Darnell Fisher
- Andy Payton
- Stuart Slater
- Tommy Johnson
- Lee Naylor
- Ben Hutchinson
- Josh Thompson
- Dion Dublin
- Nat Phillips
- Chris Sutton
- Jonjoe Kenny
- Ian Wright
- Paul Elliott
- Tony Mowbray
- Alex Oxlade-Chamberlain
- Carlton Cole
- Landon Emenalo
- Sam Johnstone
- Shim Mheuka
- Gary Hooper
- Scott Sinclair
- Benjamin Arthur
- Jahmai Simpson-Pusey

== Egypt ==
Egypt

- Haissem Hassan

== Finland ==
Finland

- Teemu Pukki
- Viljami Sinisalo

== France ==
France

- Stéphane Mahé
- Moussa Dembélé
- Odsonne Édouard
- Stéphane Bonnes
- Didier Agathe
- Jérémie Aliadière
- Marc-Antoine Fortuné
- Olivier Kapo
- Steven Mouyokolo
- Christopher Jullien

== Germany ==
Germany

- Andreas Hinkel
- Andreas Thom
- Nicolas Kühn
- Marvin Compper
- Jeremy Toljan
- Moritz Jenz
- Mika Baur

== Ghana ==
Ghana

- Mubarak Wakaso
- Jeffrey Schlupp

== Greece ==
Greece

- Vasilis Barkas
- Georgios Samaras
- Giorgos Giakoumakis

== Guinea ==
Guinea

- Bobo Balde
- Mohammed Sylla
- Mohammed Camara

== Guinea-Bissau ==
Guinea-Bissau

- Amido Baldé

== Honduras ==
Honduras

- Emilio Izaguirre
- Luis Palma

== Republic of Ireland ==
Republic of Ireland

On the partitioning of Ireland in 1922, the Dublin-based FAI were formed and fielded a separate international side from the already established Belfast run (IFA) Ireland international side. Up until 1953 both sides claimed to represent all of Ireland, at which point FIFA ruled that neither side could call themselves "Ireland"; instead, the FAI side were named "Republic of Ireland" whilst the IFA side were named "Northern Ireland". Several players had been capped by both international sides following partition, until 1950 when FIFA intervened and ruled that players could no longer do this.

- Pat Bonner
- Shay Given
- Paul Byrne
- Tony Cascarino
- Daryl Murphy
- Tommy Coyne
- Shane Duffy
- Sean Fallon
- Patsy Gallacher
- Cillian Sheridan
- Darren O'Dea
- Jonny Hayes
- Richie Towell
- Charlie Gallagher
- Joe Haverty
- Colin Healy
- Adam Idah
- Bosun Lawal
- Mikey Johnston
- Peter Kavanagh
- Robbie Keane
- Roy Keane
- Shane Duffy
- Willo Flood
- Johnny Kenny
- Mick McCarthy
- Aiden McGeady
- Liam Miller
- Chris Morris
- Lee O'Connor
- Liam Scales
- James McCarthy
- Anthony Stokes
- Paddy Turner

== Ireland ==
Ireland

From 1882 to 1921 Ireland were an "All Ireland" side. On the partitioning of Ireland in 1920 they continued to play as Ireland (IFA) alongside the newly formed Dublin-based Irish Free State side. Up until 1953 both sides claimed to represent all of Ireland, at which point FIFA ruled that neither side could call themselves "Ireland"; instead, the IFA side were named "Northern Ireland" whilst the FAI side were named "Republic of Ireland". Several players were capped by both international sides following partition, until 1950 when FIFA intervened and ruled that players could no longer do this.

- Frank Collins^{2}
- Billy Cook
- Patsy Gallacher^{2}
- Peter Kavanagh^{2}
- Charlie Tully Also later played for Northern Ireland

== Israel ==
Israel

- Eyal Berkovic
- Nir Biton
- Rami Gershon
- Beram Kayal
- Hatem Abd Elhamed
- Liel Abada

== Italy ==
Italy

- Paolo Di Canio
- Enrico Annoni
- Massimo Donati
- Luca Santonocito
- Leo Fasan

== Ivory Coast ==
Ivory Coast

- Olivier Tebily
- Ismalia Soro
- Kolo Touré
- Eboue Kouassi
- Vakoun Issouf Bayo

== Iceland ==
Iceland

- Teddy Bjarnason
- Jóhannes Eðvaldsson
- Hólmbert Friðjónsson

== Latvia ==
Latvia

- Antons Kurakins

== Japan ==
Japan

- Koki Mizuno
- Shunsuke Nakamura
- Kyogo Furuhashi
- Daizen Maeda
- Yosuke Ideguchi
- Reo Hatate
- Yuki Kobayashi
- Shin Yamada
- Tomoki Iwata
- Hayato Inamura

== Kenya ==
Kenya

- Victor Wanyama

== Montenegro ==
Montenegro

- Sead Hakšabanović

== Morocco ==
Morocco

- Badr El Kaddouri

== Mexico ==
Mexico

- Efraín Juárez
- Julián Araujo

== Netherlands ==
Netherlands

- Edson Braafheid
- Glenn Loovens
- Osaze Urhoghide
- Pierre van Hooijdonk
- Joël van den Berg
- Derk Boerrigter
- Regi Blinker
- Bobby Petta
- Dorus de Vries
- Jan Vennegoor of Hesselink
- Evander Sno
- Virgil Van Dijk
- Jos Hooiveld
- Jeremie Frimpong

== New Zealand ==
New Zealand

- Chris Killen

== Nigeria ==
Nigeria

- Efe Ambrose
- Kelechi Iheanacho
- Ibrahim Rabiu

== Northern Ireland ==
Northern Ireland

- Conor Hazard
- Neil Lennon
- Paddy McCourt
- Niall McGinn
- Allen McKnight
- Bertie Peacock
- Michael McGovern
- Anton Rogan
- Charlie Tully
- Josh Clarke

== Norway ==
Norway

- Kristoffer Ajer
- Harald Brattbakk
- Vidar Riseth
- Thomas Rogne
- Leo Hjelde
- Stefan Johansen
- Jo Inge Berget
- Mohamed Elyounoussi
- Odin Thiago Holm

== Poland ==
Poland

- Artur Boruc
- Paweł Brożek
- Dariusz Dziekanowski
- Dariusz Wdowczyk
- Maciej Zurawski
- Łukasz Załuska
- Patryk Klimala
- Maik Nawrocki

== Portugal ==
Portugal

- Jorge Cadete
- Jota
- Paulo Bernardo

== Russia ==
Russia

- Dmitri Kharine

== Scotland ==
Scotland Appearances correct as of 16 November 2021

- Roy Aitken (50)
- George Allan
- Walter Arnott
- Stuart Armstrong (6)
- Bertie Auld (3)
- Scott Bain (3)
- Barney Battles, Sr. (3)
- Craig Beattie (5)
- Jack Bell (5)
- Alec Bennett (3)
- James Blessington (4)
- Jimmy Bone
- Tom Boyd (66)
- Jim Brogan (4)
- Scott Brown (52)
- John Browning (1)
- Mark Burchill (6)
- Tommy Burns (8)
- Craig Burley (16)
- Gary Caldwell (17)
- John Campbell (12)
- Joe Cassidy (4)
- Stevie Chalmers (5)
- Ryan Christie (8)
- John Clark (4)
- Bobby Collins (22)
- John Collins (32)
- Kris Commons (5)
- Alfie Conn
- George Connelly (2)
- Jim Craig (1)
- Joe Craig (1)
- Tully Craig.
- Stephen Crainey (4)
- Paddy Crerand (11)
- William Cringan (5)
- Johnny Crum (2)
- Kenny Dalglish (47)
- John "Dixie" Deans (2)
- Jimmy Delaney (9)
- John Divers Sr. (1)
- John Divers Jr. (1)
- Joe Dodds (3)
- Simon Donnelly (10)
- Peter Dowds (1)
- Dan Doyle (8)
- Johnny Doyle
- Rab Douglas (18)
- Bobby Evans (45)
- Willie Fernie (12)
- James Forrest (38)
- Danny Fox (1)
- Mike Galloway (1)
- Tommy Gemmell (18)
- Gary Gillespie
- John Gilchrist (1)
- Ronnie Glavin (1)
- Craig Gordon (14)
- Jonathan Gould (2)
- Peter Grant (2)
- Leigh Griffiths (18)
- Willie Groves (2)
- Frank Haffey (2)
- Paul Hartley (11)
- Mike Haughney (1)
- David Hay (27)
- Jimmy Hay (8)
- Jack Hendry (3)
- Bobby Hogg (1)
- John Hughes (8)
- Ally Hunter (2)
- Darren Jackson (8)
- Leslie Johnston
- Mo Johnston (10)
- Jimmy Johnstone (23)
- James Kelly (7)
- Joe Kennaway^{1} (1)
- Jim Kennedy (6)
- John Kennedy (1)
- Alexander King (4)
- Paul Lambert (31)
- Bobby Lennox (10)
- Willie Loney (2)
- Duncan MacKay (14)
- Murdo MacLeod (5)
- Lou Macari (6)
- Jake Madden (2)
- Willie Maley (2)
- Shaun Maloney (10)
- David Marshall (2)
- Gordon Marshall (1)
- Henry Marshall (2)
- Daniel McArthur (3)
- Andrew McAtee (1)
- Frank McAvennie (1)
- Joe McBride (2)
- Brian McClair (4)
- Frank McGarvey (5)
- James McGhee
- Peter McGonagle (6)
- Danny McGrain (62)
- Callum McGregor (39)
- Jimmy McGrory (7)
- Tommy McInally (2)
- Thomas McKeown (2)
- Tosh McKinlay (22)
- James McLaren (2)
- Adam McLean (4)
- Donald McLeod (4)
- Sandy McMahon (6)
- Stephen McManus (22)
- Jimmy McMenemy (12)
- Alec McNair (15)
- Jackie McNamara (30)
- Billy McNeill (29)
- John McPhail (5)
- Paul McStay (76)
- Willie McStay (13)
- Peter Meechan (1)
- Kenny Miller (7)
- Willie Miller (6)
- Neil Mochan (3)
- Lewis Morgan (1)
- Charlie Mulgrew (22)
- Bobby Murdoch (12)
- Frank Murphy (1)
- Charlie Napier (3)
- Charlie Nicholas (6)
- Frank O'Donnell
- Phil O'Donnell
- Brian O'Neil (1)
- Willie Orr (1)
- George Paterson (2)
- Stephen Pearson (4)
- Steven Pressley
- Davie Provan (10)
- Jimmy Quinn (11)
- Anthony Ralston (1)
- Barry Robson (7)
- Davie Russell (4)
- Peter Scarff (1)
- Ronnie Simpson (5)
- Eric Smith (2)
- Jamie Smith (2)
- Jimmy Smith
- Peter Somers (4)
- David Storrier (3)
- Greg Taylor (4)
- Kieran Tierney (12)
- Alec Thomson (3)
- John Thomson (4)
- Bertie Thomson (1)
- Andy Walker (3)
- Willie Wallace (4)
- Derek Whyte (4)
- Mark Wilson (1)
- Paul Wilson (1)
- Peter Wilson (4)
- James Young (1)

== Senegal ==
Senegal

- Diomansy Kamara
- Henri Camara

== Serbia ==
Serbia

- Stefan Šćepović

== Sierra Leone ==
Sierra Leone

- Mohamed Bangura

== Slovakia ==
Slovakia

- Ľubomír Moravčík
- Stanislav Varga
- Ľuboš Kamenár

== South Korea ==
South Korea

- Oh Hyeon-gyu
- Cha Du-ri
- Ki Sung-Yueng
- Yang Hyun-jun
- Kwon Hyeok-kyu

== Sweden ==
Sweden

- John Guidetti
- Magnus Hedman
- Henrik Larsson
- Mikael Lustig
- Benjamin Nygren
- Viktor Noring
- Daniel Majstorović
- Johan Mjällby
- Carl Starfelt
- Gustaf Lagerbielke
- Freddie Ljungberg

== Switzerland ==
Switzerland

- Ramon Vega
- Stephane Henchoz
- Jordan Lotomba
- Saidy Janko
- Benjamin Siegrist
- Albian Ajeti

== Spain ==
Spain

- David Fernández
- Javier Sánchez Broto
- Marc Crosas
- Álex Valle

== Tunisia ==
Tunisia

- Sebastian Tounekti
- Lassad Nouioui

== Turkey ==
Turkey

- Nadir Çiftçi
- Colin Kazim-Richards

== United States of America ==
United States

- Cameron Carter-Vickers
- Auston Trusty
- Timothy Weah
- Dominic Cervi
- Andrew Gutman
- Manny Perez

== Uruguay ==
Uruguay

- Marcelo Saracchi
- Diego Laxalt

== Ukraine ==
Ukraine

- Maryan Shved

== Venezuela ==
Venezuela

- Fernando de Ornelas
- Miku

== Wales ==
Wales

- Craig Bellamy
- John Hartson
- Joe Ledley
- Adam Matthews
- Callum Osmand

== Zimbabwe ==
Zimbabwe

- Kundai Benyu

== Notes ==
- ^{1} Joe Kennaway had dual nationality
- ^{2} Between 1921 and 1950 several players were capped by both the Irish Free State (Dublin based FAI) and Ireland (Belfast based IFA) as both teams claimed they represented the whole of Ireland. In 1950, FIFA intervened and ruled that players were no longer allowed to play for both sides. From 1953, under further instruction from FIFA, the Dublin-run FAI team became known as Republic of Ireland whilst the Belfast-run IFA team became known as Northern Ireland.
