= Willie Moffat =

Scottish footballer (1900–1974)

Personal information
- Full name: William Aitchison Moffat
- Date of birth: 1900
- Place of birth: Blackridge, Scotland
- Date of death: 1974 (aged 73–74)
- Place of death: Hamilton, Scotland
- Height: 5 ft 9 in (1.75 m)
- Position: Inside right

Senior career*
Years	Team	Apps	(Gls)
–	Harthill Athletic		
1922–1931	Hamilton Academical	301	(95)
1931–1933	Motherwell	27	(14)
1933–1935	Hibernian	49	(16)
1935–1936	Keith		
1936–1937	Airdrieonians	23	(13)
Total		402	(134)

International career
1931	Scottish League XI	1	(0)

Managerial career
- 1935–1936: Keith
- * Club domestic league appearances and goals

William Aitchison Moffat (1900 – 1974) was a Scottish footballer who played mainly as an inside right.

He began his senior career with Hamilton Academical in 1922 and remained with them for almost a decade, becoming club captain. In October 1931 he was selected for the Scottish Football League XI and also passed the milestone of 300 league appearances for Accies. Within weeks he had moved on to their Lanarkshire derby rivals Motherwell, at that time regularly challenging for the title but yet to win it.

Whether Moffat's arrival made a decisive improvement for the Steelmen is open to debate – their forward line of Murdoch, McMenemy, MacFadyen, Stevenson and Ferrier was well established and highly effective – but he would have been an experienced and capable deputy, and certainly he scored eight times in eleven matches as Motherwell won the 1931–32 Scottish Division One championship, which has proved to be the only such success in their history. They finished runners-up the following year, Moffat making 16 appearances with six goals, but he began to fall out of favour and with no substitutes in that era, he did not feature when they reached the 1933 Scottish Cup Final.

A few months later he moved on to Hibernian, then became player-manager of Highland League side Keith in 1935. He was relieved of his duties a year later and returned to playing for a swansong campaign with Airdrieonians (the first time he had played outside the SFL's top division).
