= Empire Exhibition Trophy =

1938 association football competition

- Founded: 1938
- Abolished: 1938; 88 years ago
- Region: Scotland; England
- Teams: 8
- Related competitions: Coronation Cup
- Last champions: (Scotland) Celtic

The Empire Exhibition Trophy was a football competition held in 1938 in conjunction with the Empire Exhibition, Scotland in Glasgow. It was held to commemorate the Exhibition, then underway in Bellahouston Park, and the prize was a solid silver model of the Tait Tower.

Four teams from Scotland and four from England contested the straight knock out competition. Brentford took the place of fellow London club Arsenal, who elected to withdraw. Celtic defeated Everton 1–0 in the final, on 10 June 1938, with a goal from Johnny Crum in extra-time. The final was watched by a crowd of over 82,000 at Ibrox Park. This tournament, like the later Coronation Cup, was held in very high regard at the time as it gave teams the opportunity to test themselves against teams from other leagues in the days before European football.

== Participants ==
Team	Achievement
(Scotland) Aberdeen	1936–37 Scottish Division One runners-up
(Scotland) Celtic	1937–38 Scottish Division One champions
(Scotland) Heart of Midlothian	1937–38 Scottish Division One runners-up
(Scotland) Rangers	1936–37 Scottish Division One champions
(England) Brentford	1937–38 First Division 6th place
(England) Chelsea	1937–38 First Division 10th place
(England) Everton	1937–38 First Division 14th place
(England) Sunderland	1936–37 FA Cup winners

== Quarter-finals ==
- (Scotland) Celtic 0 – 0 (a.e.t.) (England) Sunderland
- (Scotland) Aberdeen 4 – 1 (England) Chelsea
- (England) Everton 2 – 0 (Scotland) Rangers
- (Scotland) Hearts 1 – 0 (England) Brentford

Replay

- (Scotland) Celtic 3 – 1 (a.e.t.) (England) Sunderland

== Semi-finals ==
3 June 1938
19:00

Celtic (Scotland)	1–0	(Scotland) Hearts
Crum 70'

Ibrox Park, Glasgow
Attendance: 48,000
Referee: (England) Dr AW Barton (Ripton)
6 June 1938
19:00

Everton (England)	3–2	(Scotland) Aberdeen
Gillick 1' T Boyes 51' Lawton 56'		Armstrong 7' Strauss 27'

Ibrox Park, Glasgow
Attendance: 20,000
Referee: (England) AJ Jewell (London)

== Final ==
10 June 1938
19:00

Celtic (Scotland)	1–0 (a.e.t.)	(England) Everton
Crum 95'

Ibrox Park, Glasgow
Attendance: 82,000
Referee: (England) T. Thomson

=== Match details ===
Team details

Celtic
Everton

GK	Joe Kennaway
RB	Bobby Hogg
LB	John Morrison
RH	Chic Geatons
CH	Willie Lyon (c)
LH	George Paterson
OR	Jimmy Delaney
IR	Malky MacDonald
CF	Johnny Crum
IL	John Divers
OL	Frank Murphy

GK	Ted Sagar
RB	Billy Cook (c)
LB	Norman Greenhalgh
RH	Joe Mercer
CH	T. G. Jones
LH	Jock Thomson
OR	Albert Geldard
IR	Jimmy Cunliffe
CF	Tommy Lawton
IL	Alex Stevenson
OL	Walter Boyes

== See also ==
- Football World Championship, the first tournament featuring English and Scottish teams.
- Glasgow International Exhibition Cup, similar tournament in 1901
- 1888 Glasgow Exhibition Cup, similar tournament in 1888
- Edinburgh Exhibition Cup, similar tournament in 1908
- Coronation Cup (football), similar tournament in 1953
- Saint Mungo Cup, similar tournament in 1951
