= John Divers =

John Divers may refer to:

- John Divers (footballer, born 1874), Scottish international footballer who played for Hibernian, Celtic and Everton
- John Divers (footballer, born 1911), Scottish international footballer who played for Celtic, Morton and Oldham
- John Divers (footballer, born 1931), footballer who played in Clyde's Scottish Cup winning side of 1954–1955 and later for Exeter City and East Stirlingshire
- John Divers (footballer, born 1940), son of the footballer born 1911, played for Celtic and Partick Thistle
