= Croy, North Lanarkshire =

Coordinates: 55.958484°N 4.041831°W

Croy: Scottish Gaelic: An Crothaidh
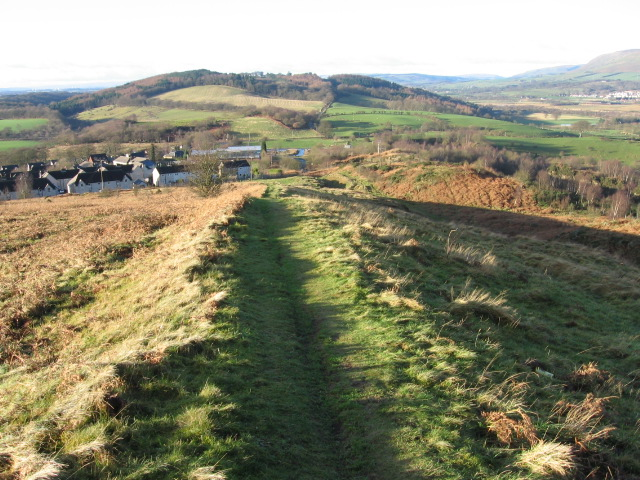
- View from Croy Hill looking towards Culmuir View, with the Bar Hill area in the distance.

- Location within North Lanarkshire
- Population: 1,890 (2020)
- OS grid reference: NS624553
- Council area: North Lanarkshire
- Lieutenancy area: Dunbartonshire
- Country: Scotland
- Sovereign state: United Kingdom
- Post town: GLASGOW
- Postcode district: G65 9
- Dialling code: 01236
- Police: Scotland
- Fire: Scottish
- Ambulance: Scottish
- UK Parliament: Cumbernauld, Kilsyth and Kirkintilloch East
- Scottish Parliament: Cumbernauld and Kilsyth

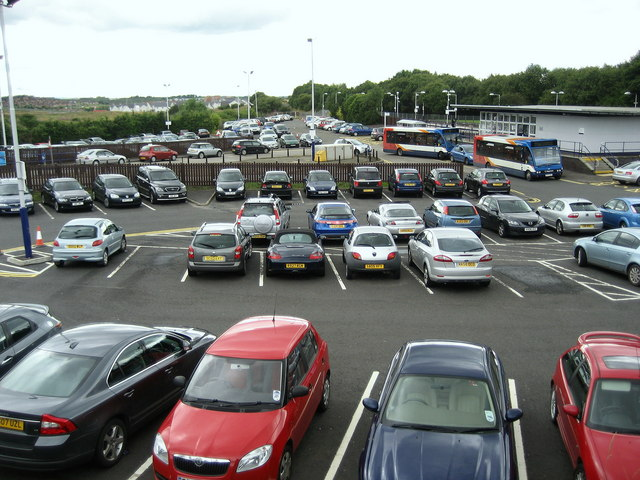
Car Park at Croy Station with new station building in background.

Croy is a village in North Lanarkshire, Scotland. A former mining community, Croy is situated south of Kilsyth and north of Cumbernauld, some 13 miles (21 km) from Glasgow and 37 miles (60 km) from Edinburgh on the main railway line between the two cities. Croy has a population of about 1,390.

Croy railway station is the transport hub for the surrounding area and is one of the busiest stations in the Scottish Central Belt. The station has frequent services seven days a week to Glasgow, Edinburgh and Stirling. The station has undergone significant expansion in recent years including extended platforms, increased car parking facilities, and a new station building & ticket office. The line has been electrified as part of the Edinburgh to Glasgow Improvement Programme.

== Antonine Wall ==
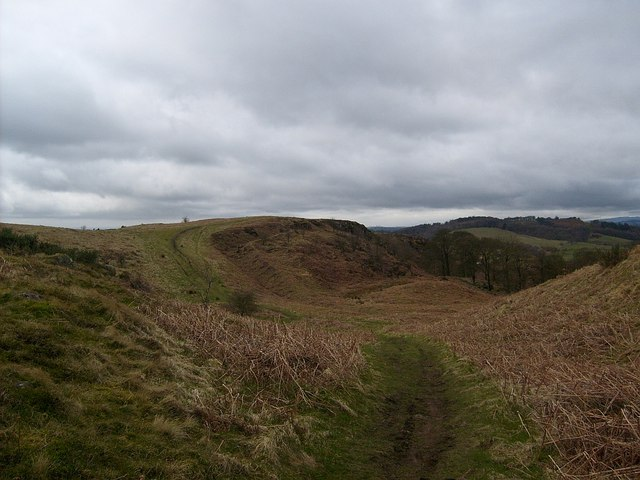
View of the outline of the Antonine Wall at Croy Hill

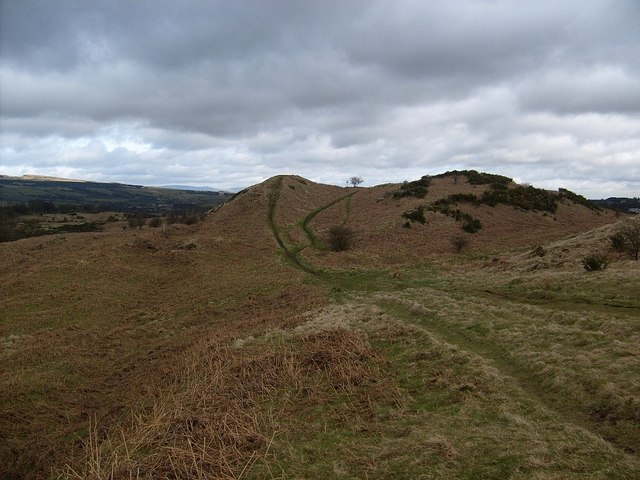
View at the summit of Croy Hill looking east

On Croy Hill, to the north east of the village, are remnants of the Antonine Wall, built by the Romans between AD 142 and 144, including a fort and two beacon platforms. Inscribed stones indicate that construction was undertaken by the Sixth Legion Victrix . Croy hill's neighbouring forts were Barr Hill to the west and Westerwood to the east. Two communication platforms known as ‘expansions’ can be seen to the west of the fortlet. Alexander Park excavated the site in 1890–1891. Sir George Macdonald wrote about his excavation of the site which occurred in 1920, 1931, and 1935. At Croy Hill, the ditch in front of the rampart was not excavated by the Romans. It is likely that hard basalt and dolerite of the hill was virtually impossible to shape with Roman tools. This is the only place along the Wall where the ditch was not dug. There is a bath house just outside one fort.

== Mining town ==
The modern settlement of Croy as it appears today is primarily the result of a coal mine being established in the mid-1800s. This attracted a sizable population of Irish immigrants to the area seeking employment and is the reason for the village's strong Roman Catholic origins. A single row of original miners' cottages is still present and occupied on the Constarry Road high street; the cottages feature highly distinctive red brickwork and are exceptionally well preserved. Locals affectionately refer to the row as 'Coronation Street' due to the similarity with the houses of the iconic UK television series.

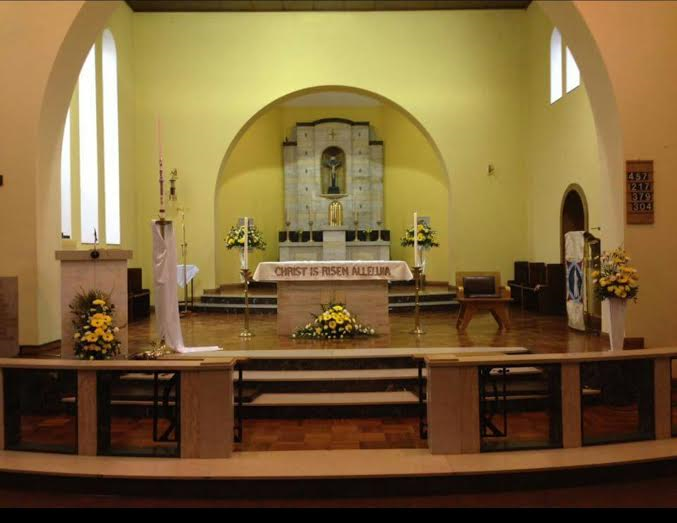
The altar in Croy church shown during Easter time.

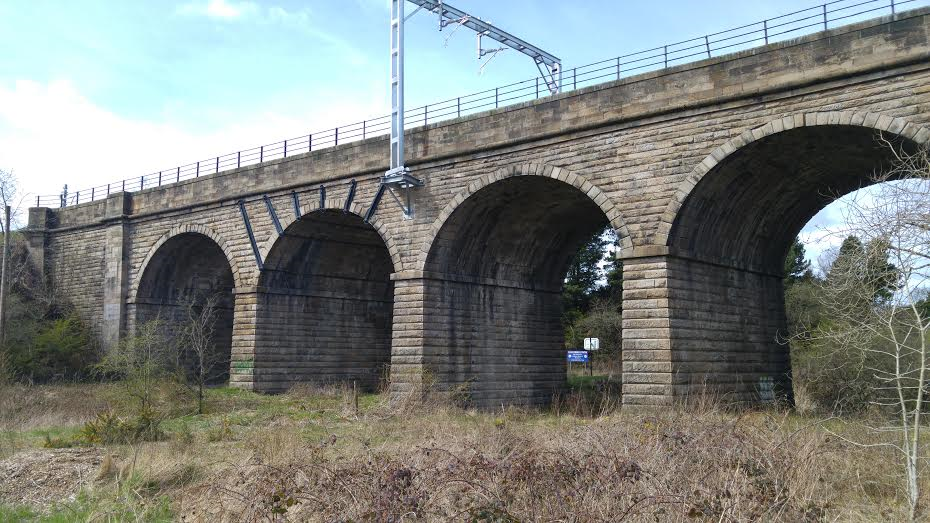
The Four Arches Viaduct near Croy Station

Croy has a Roman Catholic primary school (Holy Cross Primary) and a large Catholic church (Holy Cross Church) that services a substantial congregation from all over the local area. The church has been established for over 100 years and has some impressive architectural features; the church bells are rung prior to each service and can be heard throughout the village. Another impressive architectural feature is the Croy Railway Viaduct (known locally as the four arches). Built in the mid-1800s, the viaduct can be accessed via a heritage path running alongside Croy station. The path was redeveloped with the Croy station improvements and is now well signposted and more easily accessible. In 2013 it was announced that Croy Quarry, near the World Heritage Site of the Antonine Wall, was to close. Aggregate Industries lost their license to extract minerals at the end of 2017.

== Croy Miners Welfare Club and other amenities ==
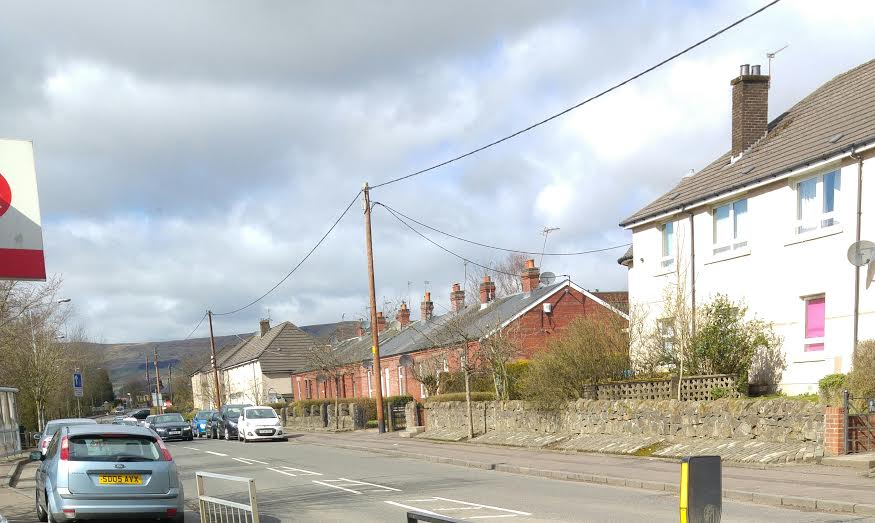
The original miners' cottages on Croy high street featuring the distinctive red brickwork

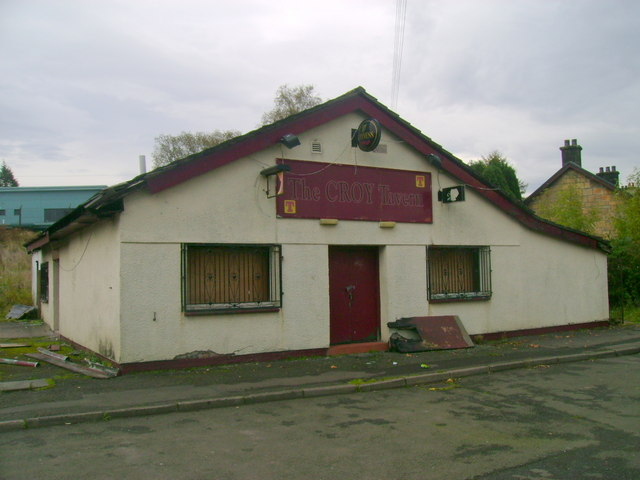
The last incarnation of Croy's local pub prior to its demolition

In 2002 the Croy Miners Welfare Charitable Society received a grant from the National Lottery Community Fund of £500,000. The grant was used to demolish the old Croy Miners Welfare Club and build a large multi-functional leisure facility to house several of the area's groups and societies. Those using the building included the Croy Historical Society, Croy Silver Band, and the Croy Male Voice Choir. Despite the sizable investment, the club suddenly closed its doors and declared insolvency without warning in 2012. The reason for this is not known and the building remains closed to date. The club's legal status is currently classed as dissolved and reports indicate the building is to be put up for sale in the near future.

Other amenities in the village include a newsagents/post office, Chinese takeaway, Indian takeaway, bakery, barbershop, and Salon.

== Croy Shrine ==
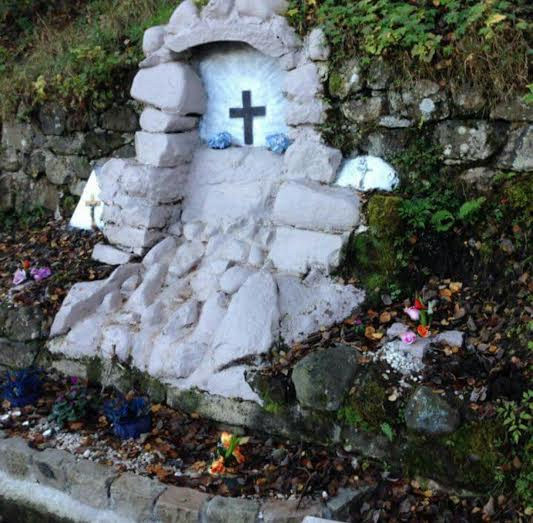
Newly restored Croy Shrine in 2014. The decision was taken to have an embedded cross as the focal point instead of a statue to prevent future vandalism.

A notable feature of the village is the Croy Shrine located in the Nethercroy area to the north-east. The Shrine was built around a natural spring in the mid-1970s by local residents and featured a statue of The Virgin Mary in a grotto scene with a stone channel in front to allow access to the spring water. The Shrine fell into a state of disrepair over the years due to neglect and vandalism. In 2013 some local residents rebuilt it and a rededication ceremony was held in 2014.

== Sports ==
=== Antonine Community Sports Hub ===
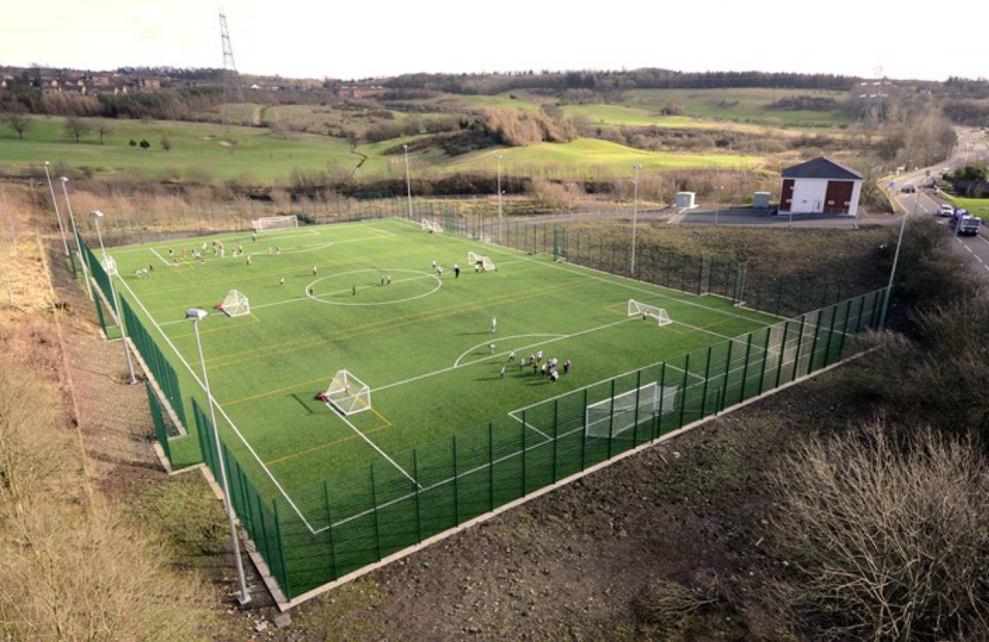
The Antonine Sports Hub in Croy

In 2012 a state of the art £1 million pound sports facility was opened in the village. Spearheaded by local residents and part financed by North Lanarkshire Council, the facility is home to a full size 3G football pitch with enclosure and stadium quality floodlighting, a 2 floor community pavilion with changing rooms and meeting area, and additional goalposts and line markings to allow conversion to 3 smaller football pitches when needed.

At the end of 2024 North Lanarkshire Council announced the closure of the Sports Hub along with closures of other facilities under the Council's control. The pitch enclosures and lighting were removed, and the Sports Hub was finally closed some time in 2025. On the 9th April 2026, North Lanarkshire Council posted an advertisement via Public Contracts Scotland advertising the building as To Let.

=== Links to Celtic F.C. ===
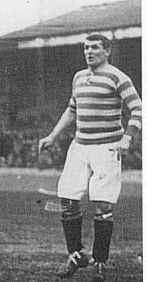
Jimmy Quinn of Croy was one of Celtic's most important players in the early 20th century

Despite the small scale of the village, Croy has a series of high-profile links with Scottish football team Celtic. At one stage there was a junior (non-league) football team in the village, Croy Celtic, the village pub was named The Celtic Tavern and in the late 1990s it featured prominently in matchday programmes. The village is predominantly populated with Celtic supporters and has a large Supporters Club (Croy CSC).

Former player Jimmy Quinn, considered one of the club's greatest ever players lived in the village. Former Celtic owner Fergus McCann, the man credited with saving the club from extinction and now recognised as one of the most important figures in the club's history, also lived in Croy and was the social convener of the local supporters club before his emigration to Canada.

In addition to Jimmy Quinn, former Celtic players who lived in the village include Andy McAtee, John Morrison, Frank Meechan, Tom McAteer, James Culley, Pat McMahon, and Jimmy Quinn (grandson of Jimmy Quinn named above). Former Celtic players not from the village but who played for Croy Celtic include Arthur McInally, Tommy McInally, Frank Murphy, and Andrew Miller.

== Notable residents ==
Other people of note with links to the village include Scottish folk singer and accordion player Will Starr. and former WBO Flyweight world champion boxer Pat Clinton.

In July 2020, Croy resident and the sitting SNP councillor for Croy & Kilsyth, Mark Kerr, was charged with multiple cases of historic sexual abuse. This generated significant coverage in various national news outlets, following which Kerr stepped down from the SNP and became an Independent Councillor. In December 2022 Kerr was found guilty on 9 charges of sexual abuse and sentenced to 6 years in prison.
