= 1932–33 Heart of Midlothian F.C. season =

Heart of Midlothian
1932–33 season
- Manager: Willie McCartney
- Stadium: Tynecastle Park
- Scottish First Division: 6th
- Scottish Cup: Round 3

During the 1932–33 season Hearts competed in the Scottish First Division, the Scottish Cup and the East of Scotland Shield.

== Fixtures ==
=== Friendlies ===
4 August 1932 Practice Match	Hearts	4–0	Hearts "A"	Tynecastle Park
	Goal			Attendance: 21,291

30 April 1933 Friendly	Penicuik Athletic	3–0	Hearts	Hays Park
	Goal

=== Dunedin Cup ===
19 September 1932 Final	Hearts	9–3	Falkirk	Tynecastle Park
	Goal			Attendance: 6,000

=== Wilson Cup ===
26 December 1932 Final	Hibernian	3–2	Hearts	Easter Road
	Goal			Attendance: 12,000

=== East of Scotland Shield ===
16 August 1933 Semi-Final	St Bernard's	0–2	Hearts	Old Logie Green
				Attendance: 8,000

31 August 1932 Final	Hearts	4–0	Hibernian	Tynecastle Park
				Attendance: 14,000

=== Rosebery Charity Cup ===
3 May 1933 R1	Hearts	4–0	Leith Athletic	Tynecastle Park
	Goal			Attendance: 1,800

10 May 1933 Semi-Final	Hearts	4–0	St Bernard's	Tynecastle Park
	Goal			Attendance: 2,394

13 May 1933 Final	Hearts	3–1	Motherwell	Tynecastle Park
	Goal			Attendance: 8,445

=== Stirling Charity Cup ===
6 May 1933 Stirling Charity Cup Final	King's Park	1–3	Hearts	Forthbank Park
				Attendance: 1,000

=== Scottish Cup ===
21 January 1933 Scottish Cup R1	Hearts	3–0	Solway Star	Tynecastle Park
				Attendance: 6,053

4 February 1933 Scottish Cup R2	Hearts	6–1	Airdrieonians	Tynecastle Park
				Attendance: 21,892

18 February 1933 Scottish Cup R3	Hearts	2–0	St Johnstone	Tynecastle Park
				Attendance: 38,885

4 March 1933 Scottish Cup R4	Hibernian	0–0	Hearts	Easter Road
				Attendance: 33,579

8 March 1933 Scottish Cup R4 Replay	Hearts	2–0	Hibernian	Tynecastle Park
				Attendance: 41,034

18 March 1933 Scottish Cup SF	Celtic	0–0	Hearts	Hampden Park
				Attendance: 87,219

22 March 1933 Scottish Cup SF Replay	Celtic	2–1	Hearts	Hampden Park
				Attendance: 63,756

=== Scottish First Division ===
13 August 1932 Scottish First Division	Partick Thistle	1–2	Hearts	Firhill Park
				Attendance: 15,000

20 August 1932 Scottish First Division	Hearts	4–0	Airdireonians	Tynecastle Park
				Attendance: 21,291

24 August 1932 Scottish First Division	Hamilton Academical	3–2	Hearts	Douglas Park
				Attendance: 4,000

27 August 1932 Scottish First Division	St Mirren	0–1	Hearts	St Mirren Park, Love Street
				Attendance: 12,000

3 September 1932 Scottish First Division	Hearts	4–2	Ayr United	Tynecastle Park
				Attendance: 18,035

10 September 1932 Scottish First Division	Cowdenbeath	0–0	Hearts	Central Park
				Attendance: 2,000

13 September 1932 Scottish First Division	Hearts	5–0	Queen's Park	Tynecastle Park
				Attendance: 11,269

17 September 1932 Scottish First Division	Hearts	1–0	Dundee	Tynecastle Park
				Attendance: 17,295

24 September 1932 Scottish First Division	Third Lanark	2–1	Hearts	Cathkin Park
				Attendance: 7,000

26 September 1932 Scottish First Division	Aberdeen	3–0	Hearts	Pittodrie Park
				Attendance: 12,000

1 October 1932 Scottish First Division	Hearts	1–1	Dundee	Tynecastle Park
				Attendance: 32,441

8 October 1932 Scottish First Division	East Stirlingshire	1–3	Hearts	Firs Park
				Attendance: 5,000

15 October 1932 Scottish First Division	Hearts	2–0	Motherwell	Tynecastle Park
				Attendance: 34,250

22 October 1932 Scottish First Division	Hearts	1–0	Rangers	Tynecastle Park
				Attendance: 24,342

29 October 1932 Scottish First Division	Falkirk	3–1	Hearts	Brockville Park
				Attendance: 8,000

5 November 1932 Scottish First Division	Hearts	6–1	Hamilton Academical	Tynecastle Park
				Attendance: 22,203

12 November 1932 Scottish First Division	Queen's Park	2–1	Hearts	Hampden Park
				Attendance: 10,000

19 November 1932 Scottish First Division	Morton	1–5	Hearts	Cappielow Park
				Attendance: 6,000

26 November 1932 Scottish First Division	Clyde	0–1	Hearts	Shawfield Stadium
				Attendance: 3,000

3 December 1932 Scottish First Division	Hearts	1–0	Kilmarnock	Tynecastle Park
				Attendance: 14,330

10 December 1932 Scottish First Division	Hearts	3–1	Aberdeen	Tynecastle Park
				Attendance: 14,875

17 December 1932 Scottish First Division	St Johnstone	2–1	Hearts	Muirton Park
				Attendance: 5,000

24 December 1932 Scottish First Division	Hearts	1–2	Partick Thistle	Tynecastle Park
				Attendance: 20,401

31 December 1933 Scottish First Division	Airdrieonians	2–7	Hearts	Broomfield Park
				Attendance: 2,000

2 January 1933 Scottish First Division	Hearts	3–1	Cowdenbeath	Tynecastle Park
				Attendance: 16,742

3 January 1933 Scottish First Division	Dundee	2–2	Hearts	Dens Park
				Attendance: 8,000

7 January 1933 Scottish First Division	Hearts	0–0	St Mirren	Tynecastle Park
				Attendance: 12,987

14 January 1933 Scottish First Division	Ayr United	1–1	Hearts	Somerset Park
				Attendance: 5,000

28 January 1933 Scottish First Division	Hearts	3–1	Third Lanark	Tynecastle Park
				Attendance: 13,193

11 February 1933 Scottish First Division	Celtic	3–2	Hearts	Celtic Park
				Attendance: 15,000

25 February 1933 Scottish First Division	Hearts	3–1	East Stirlingshire	Tynecastle Park
				Attendance: 5,937

11 March 1933 Scottish First Division	Rangers	4–4	Hearts	Ibrox Park
				Attendance: 28,000

25 March 1933 Scottish First Division	Hearts	5–2	Morton	Tynecastle Park
				Attendance: 7,109

29 March 1933 Scottish First Division	Motherwell	5–1	Hearts	Fir Park
				Attendance: 4,000

1 April 1933 Scottish First Division	Hearts	3–2	Falkirk	Tynecastle Park
				Attendance: 5,132

8 April 1933 Scottish First Division	Hearts	1–1	Clyde	Tynecastle Park
				Attendance: 7,534

12 April 1933 Scottish First Division	Kilmarnock	0–0	Hearts	Rugby Park
				Attendance: 2,000

29 April 1933 Scottish First Division	Hearts	2–1	St Johnstone	Tynecastle Park
				Attendance: 7,179

== See also ==
- List of Heart of Midlothian F.C. seasons
