= 1937–38 Heart of Midlothian F.C. season =

Heart of Midlothian
1937–38 season
- Manager: Frank Moss
- Stadium: Tynecastle Park
- Scottish First Division: 2nd
- Scottish Cup: Round 1

During the 1937–38 season Hearts competed in the Scottish First Division, the Scottish Cup and the East of Scotland Shield.

== Fixtures ==
=== Friendlies ===
9 August 1937 Practice Match	Hearts	4–1	Heart of Midlothian "A"	Tynecastle Park
	Goal

8 September 1937 Friendly	Hearts	3–3	Hibernian	Galashiels
	Goal

29 September 1937 Friendly	Derby County	2–3	Hearts	Baseball Ground
	Goal

5 March 1938 Friendly	Hearts	1–2	Ipswich Town	Tynecastle Park
	Goal

5 March 1938 Testimonial	Hearts	2–1	Derby County	Tynecastle Park
	Goal

=== Wilson Cup ===
17 August 1937 Final	Hibernian	1–4	Hearts	Easter Road
	Goal

=== East of Scotland Shield ===
22 September 1937 Semi-Final	Hearts	5–1	St Bernard's	Tynecastle Park
				Attendance: 3,488

18 April 1938 Final	Hibernian	4–0	Hearts	Easter Road
				Attendance: 4,700

=== Rosebery Charity Cup ===
4 May 1938 Semi-Final	Hearts	0–1	Leith Athletic	Tynecastle Park
	Goal

=== Empire Exhibition Cup ===
1 June 1938 Empire Exhibition Cup R1	Hearts	1–0	Brentford	Ibrox Park
	Goal			Attendance: 46,000

4 May 1938 Empire Exhibition Cup Semi-Final	Hearts	0–1	Celtic	Ibrox Park
	Goal			Attendance: 48,000

=== Scottish Cup ===
22 January 1938 Scottish Cup R1	Dundee United	3–1	Hearts	Tannadice Park
				Attendance: 15,480

=== Scottish First Division ===
14 August 1937 Scottish First Division	Hearts	2–1	St Johnstone	Tynecastle Park
				Attendance: 14,498

21 August 1937 Scottish First Division	St Mirren	1–1	Hearts	St Mirren Park, Love Street
				Attendance: 14,000

25 August 1937 Scottish First Division	St Johnstone	1–2	Hearts	Muirton Park
				Attendance: 10,000

28 August 1937 Scottish First Division	Hearts	2–1	Third Lanark	Tynecastle Park
				Attendance: 26,589

4 September 1937 Scottish First Division	Falkirk	4–2	Hearts	Brockville Park
				Attendance: 15,000

11 September 1937 Scottish First Division	Hearts	3–2	Hibernian	Tynecastle Park
				Attendance: 29,158

15 September 1937 Scottish First Division	Hearts	4–0	St Mirren	Tynecastle Park
				Attendance: 14,119

18 September 1937 Scottish First Division	Celtic	2–1	Hearts	Celtic Park
				Attendance: 35,000

25 September 1937 Scottish First Division	Hearts	3–0	Partick Thstle	Tynecastle Park
				Attendance: 21,043

2 October 1937 Scottish First Division	Motherwell	3–3	Hearts	Fir Park
				Attendance: 8,000

9 October 1937 Scottish First Division	Hearts	7–0	Ayr United	Tynecastle Park
				Attendance: 20,885

16 October 1937 Scottish First Division	Dundee	0–2	Hearts	Dens Park
				Attendance: 20,000

23 October 1937 Scottish First Division	Hearts	0–0	Clyde	Tynecastle Park
				Attendance: 19,853

30 October 1937 Scottish First Division	Hamilton Academical	2–3	Hearts	Douglas Park
				Attendance: 7,000

6 November 1937 Scottish First Division	Aberdeen	0–0	Hearts	Pittodrie Park
				Attendance: 22,000

13 November 1937 Scottish First Division	Hearts	2–0	Queen's Park	Tynecastle Park
				Attendance: 19,933

20 November 1937 Scottish First Division	Hearts	0–0	Queen of the South	Tynecastle Park
				Attendance: 20,926

27 November 1937 Scottish First Division	Rangers	0–3	Hearts	Ibrox Park
				Attendance: 51,000

4 December 1937 Scottish First Division	Hearts	2–1	Morton	Tynecastle Park
				Attendance: 12,896

11 December 1937 Scottish First Division	Hearts	4–1	Arbroath	Tynecastle Park
				Attendance: 10,616

25 December 1937 Scottish First Division	Third Lanark	3–0	Hearts	Cathkin Park
				Attendance: 6,000

1 January 1938 Scottish First Division	Hibernian	2–2	Hearts	Easter Road
				Attendance: 37,606

3 January 1938 Scottish First Division	Hearts	2–1	Dundee	Tynecastle Park
				Attendance: 24,901

4 January 1938 Scottish First Division	Hearts	1–0	Falkirk	Tynecastle Park
				Attendance: 23,534

8 January 1938 Scottish First Division	Hearts	2–4	Celtic	Tynecastle Park
				Attendance: 44,030

15 January 1938 Scottish First Division	Partick Thistle	3–1	Hearts	Firhill Park
				Attendance: 10,000

29 January 1938 Scottish First Division	Hearts	2–0	Motherwell	Tynecastle Park
				Attendance: 15,680

5 February 1938 Scottish First Division	Ayr United	2–4	Hearts	Somerset Park
				Attendance: 15,000

12 February 1938 Scottish First Division	Kilmarnock	3–1	Hearts	Rugby Park
				Attendance: 13,580

19 February 1938 Scottish First Division	Clyde	1–3	Hearts	Shawfield Stadium
				Attendance: 6,000

26 February 1938 Scottish First Division	Hearts	2–1	Hamilton Academical	Tynecastle Park
				Attendance: 9,999

12 March 1938 Scottish First Division	Hearts	2–1	Aberdeen	Tynecastle Park
				Attendance: 16,815

19 March 1938 Scottish First Division	Queen's Park	1–4	Hearts	Hampden Park
				Attendance: 7,572

26 March 1938 Scottish First Division	Queen of the South	2–3	Hearts	Tynecastle Park
				Attendance: 5,000

13 April 1938 Scottish First Division	Morton	1–2	Hearts	Cappielow Park
				Attendance: 6,000

16 April 1938 Scottish First Division	Arbroath	3–5	Hearts	Gayfield Park
				Attendance: 3,000

23 April 1938 Scottish First Division	Hearts	3–2	Rangers	Tynecastle Park
				Attendance: 28,204

30 April 1938 Scottish First Division	Hearts	5–1	Kilmarnock	Tynecastle Park
				Attendance: 9,604

== See also ==
- List of Heart of Midlothian F.C. seasons
