= 1956 Scottish Cup final =

1956 Scottish Cup Final
- Event: 1955–56 Scottish Cup
Heart of Midlothian	Celtic
3	1
- Date: 21 April 1956
- Venue: Hampden Park, Glasgow
- Referee: Bobby Davidson
- Attendance: 132,840

The 1956 Scottish Cup Final in association football was played on 21 April 1956 at Hampden Park in Glasgow and was the final of the 71st staging of the Scottish Cup. Hearts and Celtic contested the match. The match was won 3–1 by Hearts.

== Final ==
21 April 1956

Heart of Midlothian	3 – 1	Celtic
Crawford 20', 48'; Conn 80'	Report	Haughney 55'

Hampden Park, Glasgow
Attendance: 132,840
Referee: Bobby Davidson (Airdrie)

=== Teams ===
HEARTS :
GK	(Scotland) Willie Duff
RB	(Scotland) Bobby Kirk
LB	(Scotland) Tam McKenzie
RH	(Scotland) Dave Mackay
CH	(Scotland) Freddie Glidden (Captain)
LH	(Scotland) John Cumming
OR	(Scotland) Alex Young
IR	(Scotland) Alfie Conn
CF	(Scotland) Willie Bauld
IL	(Scotland) Jimmy Wardhaugh
OL	(Scotland) Ian Crawford
Manager:
(Scotland) Tommy Walker

CELTIC:
GK	(Scotland) Dick Beattie
RB	(Scotland) Frank Meechan
LB	(Republic of Ireland) Sean Fallon (Captain)
RH	(Scotland) Eric Smith
CH	(Scotland) Bobby Evans
LH	(Northern Ireland) Bertie Peacock
OR	(Scotland) Willie Craig
IR	(Scotland) Mike Haughney
CF	(Scotland) Neil Mochan
IL	(Scotland) Willie Fernie
OL	(Northern Ireland) Charlie Tully
Manager:
(Scotland) Jimmy McGrory

== See also ==
Played between same clubs:

- 1901 Scottish Cup Final
- 1907 Scottish Cup Final
- 2019 Scottish Cup Final
- 2020 Scottish Cup Final
