= 1930–31 Scottish Cup =

Tournament details
- Country: Scotland

Final positions
- Champions: Celtic
- Runners-up: Motherwell

The 1930–31 Scottish Cup was the 53rd staging of Scotland's most prestigious football knockout competition. The Cup was won by Celtic who defeated Motherwell in the replayed final.

== Fourth round ==
Team One	Team Two	Score
Celtic	Aberdeen	4-0
Bo'ness	Kilmarnock	1-1 0-5
Cowdenbeath	Motherwell	0-1
Third Lanark	St Mirren	1-1 0-3

== Semi-finals ==
14 March 1931

Celtic	3 – 0	Kilmarnock

Attendance: 53,973

14 March 1931

Motherwell	1 – 0	St Mirren

Attendance: 39,119

== Final ==
11 April 1931

Celtic	2 – 2	Motherwell
McGrory; Craig (o.g.)		Stevenson; McMenemy

Hampden Park, Glasgow
Attendance: 104,863

=== Replay ===
15 April 1931

Celtic	4 – 2	Motherwell
B. Thomson; McGrory		Murdoch; Stevenson

Hampden Park, Glasgow
Attendance: 98,509

=== Teams ===
Celtic:
GK	John Thomson
RB	Billy Cook
LB	Peter McGonagle
RH	Peter Wilson
CH	Jimmy McStay
LH	Chic Geatons
OR	Bertie Thomson
IR	Alec Thomson
CF	Jimmy McGrory
IL	Peter Scarff
OL	Charlie Napier
Replay:	Unchanged

Motherwell:
GK	Allan McClory
RB	John Johnman
LB	Sandy Hunter
RH	Hugh Wales
CH	Allan Craig
LH	Willie Telfer
OR	John Murdoch
IR	John McMenemy
CF	Willie MacFadyen
IL	George Stevenson
OL	Bob Ferrier
Replay:	Unchanged

== See also ==
- 1930–31 in Scottish football
- 1933 Scottish Cup Final (played between same teams)
