= Willie Telfer (footballer, born 1909) =

Scottish footballer

William Telfer
Personal information
- Full name: William Telfer
- Date of birth: 21 March 1909
- Place of birth: Shotts, Scotland
- Date of death: 15 May 1986 (aged 77)
- Place of death: Carluke, Scotland
- Height: 1.73 m (5 ft 8 in)
- Position: Left half

Senior career*
Years	Team	Apps	(Gls)
- Blantyre Celtic
1929–1942	Motherwell	284	(1)

International career
1932–1933	Scotland	2	(0)
1932	Scottish League XI	1	(1)
- * Club domestic league appearances and goals

William Telfer (21 March 1909 – 15 May 1986) was a Scottish footballer who played as a left half for Blantyre Celtic, Motherwell, Airdrieonians (wartime guest), Dumbarton (wartime guest) and Scotland. He was a member of the Motherwell team that won the club's only Scottish Football League title in 1931–32, missing only one match in that season, and also played in two Scottish Cup finals (1931 and 1939, defeats to Celtic and Clyde respectively).

Both of his international caps came against Ireland; the second resulted in a loss in Glasgow, and Telfer was one of five in the Scotland team who were not selected again.
