= 1954–55 Scottish Cup =

Tournament details
- Country: Scotland

Final positions
- Champions: Clyde
- Runners-up: Celtic

The 1954–55 Scottish Cup was the 70th staging of Scotland's most prestigious football knockout competition. The Cup was won by Clyde who defeated Celtic in the replayed final. It was Clyde's second cup success, whilst Celtic lost in the final having won the last five Scottish Cup finals that they had played in. The 1955 final was the first to be televised live, being broadcast by the BBC. This was not officially announced before the match. The replayed final was not televised.

== First round ==
Home team	Score	Away team
Aberdeen University	3 – 3	Girvan Amateurs
Babcock & Wilcox	3 – 1	Shawfield Amateurs
Burntisland Shipyard	1 – 7	Forres Mechanics
Chirnside United	1 – 4	Peterhead
Civil Service Strollers	2 – 3	Vale of Leithen
Deveronvale	0 – 4	Inverness Thistle
Eyemouth United	2 – 3	Buckie Thistle
Fraserburgh	9 – 0	Edinburgh University
Gala Fairydean	5 – 3	Keith
Glasgow University	1 – 5	Huntly
Inverness Caledonian	7 – 3	Rothes
Lossiemouth	6 – 0	Murrayfield Amateurs
Newton Stewart	3 – 5	Elgin City
Ross County	2 – 2	Peebles Rovers
St Cuthbert Wanderers	5 – 1	Vale of Atholl
Tarff Rovers	1 – 1	Duns
Wick Academy	2 – 4	Coldstream

=== Replays ===
Home team	Score	Away team
Duns	3 – 0	Tarff Rovers
Girvan Amateurs	2 – 0	Aberdeen University
Peebles Rovers	5 – 1	Ross County

== Second round ==
Home team	Score	Away team
Brora Rangers	2 – 0	Coldstream
Duns	1 – 8	Buckie Thistle
Elgin City	1 – 1	Clachnacuddin
Forres Mechanics	5 – 1	Huntly
Inverness Caledonian	5 – 0	Wigtown & Bladnoch
Inverness Thistle	7 – 1	Selkirk
Lossiemouth	1 – 0	Gala Fairydean
Peebles Rovers	4 – 3	Girvan Amateurs
Peterhead	7 – 0	Babcock & Wilcox
St Cuthbert Wanderers	4 – 2	Whithorn
Vale of Leithen	0 – 4	Fraserburgh

=== Replays ===
Home team	Score	Away team
Clachnacuddin	7 – 1	Elgin City

== Third round ==
Home team	Score	Away team
Berwick Rangers	3 – 3	Clachnacuddin
Brora Rangers	3 – 3	Inverness Caledonian
Fraserburgh	4 – 2	East Stirlingshire
Inverness Thistle	2 – 1	Stranraer
Lossiemouth	2 – 2	Forres Mechanics
Montrose	3 – 1	Dumbarton
Peebles Rovers	5 – 2	St Cuthbert Wanderers
Peterhead	0 – 4	Buckie Thistle

=== Replays ===
Home team	Score	Away team
Clachnacuddin	2 – 1	Berwick Rangers
Forres Mechanics	5 – 3	Lossiemouth
Inverness Caledonian	8 – 2	Brora Rangers

== Fourth round ==
Home team	Score	Away team
Alloa Athletic	4 – 2	Fraserburgh
Arbroath	2 – 0	Brechin City
Buckie Thistle	1 – 1	Queen's Park
Clachnacuddin	1 – 2	Inverness Thistle
Cowdenbeath	2 – 2	Ayr United
Dundee United	1 – 3	Forfar Athletic
Montrose	1 – 3	Inverness Caledonian
Peebles Rovers	0 – 2	Forres Mechanics

=== Replays ===
Home team	Score	Away team
Ayr United	3 – 3	Cowdenbeath
Queen's Park	1 – 2	Buckie Thistle

==== Second Replays ====
Home team	Score	Away team
Ayr United	3 – 1	Cowdenbeath

== Fifth round ==
Home team	Score	Away team
Airdrieonians	4 – 3	Forfar Athletic
Alloa Athletic	2 – 4	Celtic
Arbroath	0 – 4	St Johnstone
Buckie Thistle	2 – 0	Inverness Thistle
Clyde	3 – 0	Albion Rovers
Dunfermline Athletic	4 – 2	Partick Thistle
East Fife	1 – 2	Kilmarnock
Falkirk	4 – 0	Stenhousemuir
Forres Mechanics	3 – 4	Motherwell
Hamilton Academical	2 – 1	St Mirren
Hearts	5 – 0	Hibernian
Inverness Caledonian	1 – 1	Ayr United
Greenock Morton	1 – 3	Raith Rovers
Rangers	0 – 0	Dundee
Stirling Albion	0 – 6	Aberdeen
Third Lanark	2 – 1	Queen of the South

=== Replays ===
Home team	Score	Away team
Ayr United	2 – 4	Inverness Caledonian
Dundee	0 – 1	Rangers

== Sixth Round ==
Home team	Score	Away team
Aberdeen	2 – 1	Rangers
Airdrieonians	7 – 0	Dunfermline Athletic
Buckie Thistle	0 – 6	Hearts
Clyde	3 – 1	Raith Rovers
Inverness Caledonian	0 – 7	Falkirk
Kilmarnock	1 – 1	Celtic
St Johnstone	0 – 1	Hamilton Academical
Third Lanark	1 – 3	Motherwell

=== Replays ===
Home team	Score	Away team
Celtic	1 – 0	Kilmarnock

== Quarter-finals ==
Home team	Score	Away team
Airdrieonians	4 – 1	Motherwell
Celtic	2 – 1	Hamilton Academical
Clyde	5 – 0	Falkirk
Hearts	1 – 1	Aberdeen

=== Replays ===
Home team	Score	Away team
Aberdeen	2 – 0	Hearts

== Semi-finals ==
26 March 1955

Celtic	2–2	Airdrieonians

Hampden Park, Glasgow
Attendance: 88,840

26 March 1955

Clyde	2–2	Aberdeen
Tommy Ring 9' 89'		Paddy Buckley 37' 40'

Easter Road, Edinburgh
Attendance: 33,000
Referee: Bob Davidson

=== Replays ===
4 April 1955

Celtic	2–0	Airdrieonians

Hampden Park, Glasgow
Attendance: 71,800

4 April 1955

Clyde	1–0	Aberdeen
Archie Robertson 28'

Easter Road, Edinburgh
Attendance: 27,937
Referee: Bob Davidson

== Final ==
23 April 1955

Clyde	1–1	Celtic
Archie Robertson	Report (Page 4)	Walsh

Hampden Park, Glasgow
Attendance: 106,234
Referee: Charlie Faultless

Teams

CLYDE:
GK	(South Africa) Ken Hewkins
RB	(Republic of Ireland) Albert Murphy
LB	(Scotland) Harry Haddock
RH	(Scotland) Ralph Granville
CH	(Scotland) Tommy Anderson (c)
LH	(Scotland) Davie Laing
RW	(Scotland) John Divers
IR	(Scotland) Archie Robertson
CF	(Scotland) Ally Hill
IL	(Scotland) George Brown
LW	(Scotland) Tommy Ring
Manager:
(Scotland) Paddy Travers

CELTIC:
GK	(Scotland) John Bonnar
RB	(Scotland) Mike Haughney
LB	(Scotland) Frank Meechan
RH	(Scotland) Bobby Evans
CH	(Scotland) Jock Stein (c)
LH	(Northern Ireland) Bertie Peacock
RW	(Scotland) Bobby Collins
IR	(Scotland) Willie Fernie
CF	(Scotland) John McPhail
IL	(Scotland) Jimmy Walsh
LW	(Northern Ireland) Charlie Tully
Manager:
(Scotland) Jimmy McGrory

=== Replay ===
27 April 1955

Clyde	1–0	Celtic
Tommy Ring	Report (Page 4)

Hampden Park, Glasgow
Attendance: 68,831
Referee: Charlie Faultless

Teams

CLYDE:
GK	(South Africa) Ken Hewkins
RB	(Republic of Ireland) Albert Murphy
LB	(Scotland) Harry Haddock
RH	(Scotland) Ralph Granville
CH	(Scotland) Tommy Anderson (c)
LH	(Scotland) Davie Laing
RW	(Scotland) John Divers
IR	(Scotland) Archie Robertson
CF	(Scotland) Ally Hill
IL	(Scotland) George Brown
LW	(Scotland) Tommy Ring
Manager:
(Scotland) Paddy Travers

CELTIC:
GK	(Scotland) John Bonnar
RB	(Scotland) Mike Haughney
LB	(Scotland) Frank Meechan
RH	(Scotland) Bobby Evans
CH	(Scotland) Jock Stein (c)
LH	(Northern Ireland) Bertie Peacock
RW	(Scotland) Jimmy Walsh
IR	(Scotland) Willie Fernie
CF	(Republic of Ireland) Sean Fallon
IL	(Scotland) John McPhail
LW	(Northern Ireland) Charlie Tully
Manager:
(Scotland) Jimmy McGrory

== See also ==
- 1954–55 in Scottish football
- 1954–55 Scottish League Cup
