= John Morrison (footballer, born 1909) =

Scottish footballer

Personal information
- Date of birth: 9 November 1909
- Place of birth: Croy, Scotland
- Date of death: 25 May 1992 (aged 82)
- Place of death: Croy, Scotland
- Position: Left back

Senior career*
Years	Team	Apps	(Gls)
–	Croy Celtic		
1929–1941	Celtic	162	(1)
1930–1931	→ Burnbank Athletic (loan)		
1941–1942	Greenock Morton	0	(0)
- * Club domestic league appearances and goals

John Morrison (9 November 1909 – 25 May 1992) was a Scottish footballer who played as a left back, primarily for Celtic, where he spent a decade, although he was only a regular starter for four of those years (in the seasons leading up to World War II), gradually displacing the established Peter McGonagle.

Originally a coal miner from the pit village of Croy (which produced several players for Celtic such as Jimmy Quinn and Andy McAtee), Morrison won the Scottish Football League championship in 1935–36, the Scottish Cup in 1937, and four trophies during 1938: the League title in April, the Charity Cup in May, the Empire Exhibition Trophy in June and the Glasgow Cup during the following season in October.
