= 1931–32 Heart of Midlothian F.C. season =

Heart of Midlothian
1931–32 season
- Manager: Willie McCartney
- Stadium: Tynecastle Park
- Scottish First Division: 8th
- Scottish Cup: Round 3
Home colours

During the 1931–32 season Hearts competed in the Scottish First Division, the Scottish Cup and the East of Scotland Shield.

== Fixtures ==
=== Scottish First Division ===
8 August 1931 Scottish First Division	Dundee United	0–2	Hearts	Tannadice Park
				Attendance: 8,000

15 August 1931 Scottish First Division	Hearts	3–0	Kilmarnock	Tynecastle Park
				Attendance: 22,603

19 August 1931 Scottish First Division	Celtic	3–0	Hearts	Celtic Park
				Attendance: 15,000

22 August 1931 Scottish First Division	Morton	1–2	Hearts	Cappielow Park
				Attendance: 7,000

25 August 1931 Scottish First Division	Hearts	0–1	Partick Thistle	Tynecastle Park
				Attendance: 17,252

29 August 1931 Scottish First Division	Hearts	2–0	Clyde	Tynecastle Park
				Attendance: 15,367

1 September 1931 Scottish First Division	Hearts	0–2	Airdrieonians	Tynecastle Park
				Attendance: 12,114

5 September 1931 Scottish First Division	Leith Athletic	2–0	Hearts	Marine Gardens
				Attendance: 10,000

9 September 1931 Scottish First Division	Cowdenbeath	2–1	Hearts	Central Park
				Attendance: 6,000

12 September 1931 Scottish First Division	Hearts	0–0	Aberdeen	Tynecastle Park
				Attendance: 12,000

19 September 1931 Scottish First Division	Queen's Park	5–2	Hearts	Hampden Park
				Attendance: 10,000

26 September 1931 Scottish First Division	Hearts	0–0	Rangers	Tynecastle Park
				Attendance: 31,023

3 October 1931 Scottish First Division	Hamilton Academical	1–4	Hearts	Douglas Park
				Attendance: 6,000

10 October 1931 Scottish First Division	Hearts	2–0	Falkirk	Tynecastle Park
				Attendance: 16,106

17 October 1931 Scottish First Division	Motherwell	2–0	Hearts	Fir Park
				Attendance: 8,000

24 October 1931 Scottish First Division	Hearts	3–1	Dundee	Tynecastle Park
				Attendance: 16,240

31 October 1931 Scottish First Division	St Mirren	5–1	Hearts	St Mirren Park, Love Street
				Attendance: 7,000

7 November 1931 Scottish First Division	Hearts	2–3	Third Lanark	Tynecastle Park
				Attendance: 13,380

14 November 1931 Scottish First Division	Ayr United	1–2	Hearts	Somerset Park
				Attendance: 2,000

21 November 1931 Scottish First Division	Hearts	2–1	Celtic	Tynecastle Park
				Attendance: 31,244

28 November 1931 Scottish First Division	Partick Thistle	1–0	Hearts	Firhill Park
				Attendance: 15,000

5 December 1931 Scottish First Division	Airdrieonians	3–1	Hearts	Broomfield Park
				Attendance: 5,000

12 December 1931 Scottish First Division	Hearts	3–2	Cowdenbeath	Tynecastle Park
				Attendance: 12,519

19 December 1931 Scottish First Division	Hearts	5–0	Dundee United	Tynecastle Park
				Attendance: 10,667

26 December 1931 Scottish First Division	Kilmarnock	2–1	Hearts	Rugby Park
				Attendance: 4,000

1 January 1932 Scottish First Division	Hearts	4–2	Leith Athletic	Tynecastle Park
				Attendance: 14,658

2 January 1932 Scottish First Division	Aberdeen	1–2	Hearts	Pittodrie Park
				Attendance: 12,000

9 January 1932 Scottish First Division	Hearts	0–0	Morton	Tynecastle Park
				Attendance: 10,646

23 January 1932 Scottish First Division	Clyde	6–2	Hearts	Shawfield Stadium
				Attendance: 10,000

6 February 1932 Scottish First Division	Rangers	4–2	Hearts	Ibrox Park
				Attendance: 25,000

20 February 1932 Scottish First Division	Falkirk	0–2	Hearts	Brockville Park
				Attendance: 8,000

27 February 1932 Scottish First Division	Hearts	0–1	Motherwell	Tynecastle Park
				Attendance: 23,074

5 March 1932 Scottish First Division	Dundee	1–0	Hearts	Dens Park
				Attendance: 4,000

12 March 1932 Scottish First Division	Hearts	2–2	St Mirren	Tynecastle Park
				Attendance: 10,333

19 March 1932 Scottish First Division	Third Lanark	3–4	Hearts	Cathkin Park
				Attendance: 6,000

26 March 1932 Scottish First Division	Hearts	1–1	Ayr United	Tynecastle Park
				Attendance: 8,187

9 April 1932 Scottish First Division	Hearts	4–2	Hamilton Academical	Tynecastle Park
				Attendance: 3,891

16 April 1932 Scottish First Division	Hearts	2–0	Queen's Park	Tynecastle Park
				Attendance: 8,247

== See also ==
- List of Heart of Midlothian F.C. seasons
