= McClory =

McClory is a surname. Notable people with the surname include:

- Allan McClory (1899–1983), Scottish footballer
- Belinda McClory (born 1968), Australian actor
- Kevin McClory (1924–2006), Irish screenwriter, film producer and director
- Robert McClory (1908–1988), American politician
- Robert J. McClory (born 1963), American Catholic bishop
- Sean McClory (1924–2003), Irish actor
