= Sandy Hunter (footballer) =

Scottish footballer

Personal information
- Full name: Alexander Forrest Hunter
- Date of birth: 1898
- Place of birth: Hamilton, Scotland
- Date of death: 1981 (aged 82–83)
- Place of death: Hamilton, Scotland
- Height: 5 ft 6 in (1.68 m)
- Position: Full back

Youth career
- Cadzow Guild

Senior career*
Years	Team	Apps	(Gls)
–	Larkhall Thistle		
1921–1928	Hamilton Academical	180	(0)
1926	→ Dumbarton (loan)	0	(0)
1928–1932	Motherwell	81	(0)
1932	Bo'ness	11	(0)
1932–1934	Hamilton Academical	10	(0)
Total		282	(0)
- * Club domestic league appearances and goals

Alexander Forrest Hunter (1898 – 1981) was a Scottish footballer who played as a full back (comfortable in either the right or left berth) for Hamilton Academical, Motherwell and Bo'ness .

Between 1921 and 1928 he played 200 times for hometown club Hamilton, who were members of the Scottish Football League's top division throughout the period. He served a brief loan at Dumbarton in 1926 which consisted of one appearance in the Scottish Cup.

After moving to Accies' Lanarkshire derby rivals Motherwell in a swap deal involving winger Frank Wilson, Hunter was a regular in the defence for two seasons in which the club finished second then third in the league table, and took part in the 1931 Scottish Cup Final which the Steelmen lost to Celtic after a replay, having led in the first match until the final minute, and was praised in press reports for his performance in both games. Technically he was also a member of the squad that won the league title in 1931–32, but he had fallen out favour at Fir Park and made only one appearance in that campaign before moving on to second-level Bo'ness mid-season; he then returned to Hamilton for a second spell as a veteran in a back-up role.
