= Allan Craig =

Allan Craig may refer to:

- Allan Craig (footballer) (1904–1978), Scottish football player (Motherwell, Chelsea, national team)
- Allan Craig (rugby union) (born 2002), New Zealand rugby union player (Northland, Moana Pasifika)

== See also ==
- Alan Craig, British political campaigner
- Allen Craig, American baseball player
