= Frank Wilson (footballer) =

Scottish footballer

Personal information
- Full name: Francis Wilson
- Date of birth: 1904
- Place of birth: Motherwell, Scotland
- Height: 5 ft 8 in (1.73 m)
- Position: Outside right

Senior career*
Years	Team	Apps	(Gls)
–	Motherwell Juniors		
1926–1928	Motherwell	10	(1)
1926	→ Mid-Annandale (loan)		
1928–1933	Hamilton Academical	150	(14)
1933–1934	Preston North End		
1934–1935	Falkirk	21	(2)
1935–1936	Glentoran		
1936–1937	Alloa Athletic	27	(7)
1937–1938	Rochdale	7	(1)
1938–1939	Ross County		
- * Club domestic league appearances and goals

Francis Wilson (born 1904) was a Scottish footballer who played as an outside right.

He began his senior career at hometown club Motherwell, being farmed out to non-league Mid-Annandale, helping them win the Scottish Qualifying Cup. In 1928 he moved to neighbours Hamilton Academical in a swap deal involving defender Sandy Hunter and became established at Accies, forming a wing partnership with Willie Moffat; the team reached the semi-finals of the Scottish Cup three times during his five-year spell at Douglas Park.

In 1933 Wilson signed for Preston North End but was sold on after one season to Falkirk. He then switched to Northern Ireland with Glentoran, returned to Scotland with Alloa Athletic then had another short spell in northern England, this time with Rochdale, before joining Ross County of the Highland League. During World War II he featured for Hamilton and Aberdeen.
