= Ken Hewkins =

South African soccer player

Personal information
- Full name: Kenneth John Robert Hewkins
- Date of birth: 30 October 1929
- Place of birth: Pretoria, South Africa
- Date of death: 9 June 2013 (aged 83)
- Place of death: Benoni, South Africa
- Position: Goalkeeper

Senior career*
Years	Team	Apps	(Gls)
1947–1949	Germiston Callies		
1949–1955	Clyde	34	(0)
1955–1962	Fulham	38	(0)
1962–1963	Cape Town City		
1963–1964	Berea Park		
Total		72	(0)
- * Club domestic league appearances and goals

Kenneth John Robert Hewkins (30 October 1929 – 9 June 2013) was a South African footballer, who was 19 years old when he played goal keeper in the final for Delfos when they won the 1949 Transvaal Challenge Cup.Ken Hewkins also represented his province Southern Transvaal. He also played overseas as a goalkeeper for Clyde and Fulham. Hewkins made 15 league appearances for Clyde in 1949–50 before returning to South Africa.

In October 1954, Clyde signed Hewkins for the second time and he was part of the Clyde team that won the 1954–55 Scottish Cup.

After 19 Scottish league appearances in his second spell, he signed for Fulham in November 1955.
