= Allan Craig (footballer) =

Scottish footballer

Personal information
- Date of birth: 7 February 1904
- Place of birth: Paisley, Scotland
- Date of death: 26 December 1978 (aged 74)
- Place of death: Paisley, Scotland
- Height: 5 ft 10 in (1.78 m)
- Position: Centre half

Senior career*
Years	Team	Apps	(Gls)
–	Saltcoats Victoria		
1924–1933	Motherwell	294	(3)
1933–1939	Chelsea	196	(0)
–	Dartford		
Total		490	(3)

International career
1929–1932	Scotland	3	(0)
1929–1930	Scottish League XI	2	(0)
- * Club domestic league appearances and goals

Allan Leggat Craig (7 February 1904 – 26 December 1978) was a Scottish footballer who played as a centre half for Motherwell, Chelsea and Scotland.

== Career ==
=== Club ===
Craig played junior football for Saltcoats Victoria until he signed for Motherwell in 1924. He was a key part of the side that won the Scottish league championship in the 1931–32 season, having also played in the 1931 Scottish Cup Final which Motherwell lost to Celtic after a replay, Craig scoring an unfortunate last-minute own goal in the first match (this was said to have resulted from a mistake in communication: a teammate shouted for 'Allan' to claim a cross ball and both he and goalkeeper Allan McClory did so, with the ball ending up in the net).

He moved to Chelsea in 1933 and played for the West London club until the outbreak of the Second World War in 1939, making 211 appearances in the Football League and FA Cup.

=== International ===
Craig represented Scotland three times, twice in a 1929 tour and once in 1932. He also appeared twice for the Scottish Football League XI.
