= Will Starr =

Scottish musician

- Born: William Starrs; 27 April 1922; Croy, North Lanarkshire, Scotland
- Died: 6 March 1976 (aged 53) Croy, North Lanarkshire, Scotland
- Genres: Scottish country dance Music
- Occupation: Musician
- Instrument: Accordion
- Years active: 1940–1976

Will Starr (27 April 1922 – 6 March 1976) was a Scottish solo accordionist.

== Early life ==
Will Starr was born William Starrs, the oldest son of a family of eight, in the mining village of Croy in Central Scotland.

At the age of two, Starr attempted to play his first tune, "Poor Old Joe", on a melodeon belonging to his father, Joseph Starrs. His family recognised the musical potential in young William and encouraged him to continue playing the melodeon. Later he progressed from the melodeon to the chromatic button accordion which he played for the remainder of his life. Starr frequently played at local events and social functions accompanied by his sister Rosie, a singer.

== Career ==
At the age of thirteen, while making a solo guest appearance at a County Dinner in the Grand Hotel in Glasgow, Starr was introduced by Sir Ian Colquhoun to Jock Kilpatrick, the manager of the Pavilion Theatre in Glasgow. Kilpatrick invited him to join the cast as a solo performer, and after being granted permission to take time off school, Starr began a part-time professional stage career.

On leaving school at fourteen, Starr worked in the mines. When at the age of eighteen in World War II he became eligible for service in the armed forces, he was exempted as an already working miner.

Starr recorded his first 78 record for Parlophone at the age of 18. The music was of his own composition and was named "Jacqueline" (sometimes known, erroneously, as "The Jacqueline Waltz") after his then-girlfriend. Starr travelled the world as an international performer. He made several albums of accordion music.

== Death ==
Starr died from cancer of the spine in his home town of Croy on 6 March 1976, at age 53, and was buried in the Starr family grave in Howe Road Cemetery, Kilsyth, Stirlingshire. The Will Starr Society, formed to remember Starr's music, had 400 members in multiple countries.
