= George Walker (footballer, born 1909) =

Scottish footballer

Personal information
- Date of birth: 24 May 1909
- Place of birth: Musselburgh, Scotland
- Height: 6 ft 0 in (1.83 m)
- Position: Centre half

Senior career*
Years	Team	Apps	(Gls)
–	Rosslyn Juniors		
1926–1933	St Mirren	210	(6)
1933–1936	Notts County		
1936–1939	Crystal Palace	102	(1)
1939	Watford	0	(0)

International career
1930–1931	Scotland	4	(0)
1931–1932	Scottish League XI	2	(0)
- * Club domestic league appearances and goals

George Walker (born 24 May 1909) was a Scottish footballer who played as a centre half for St Mirren, Notts County, Crystal Palace, Watford and Scotland. He made 102 Football League appearances for Crystal Palace, scoring once, between June 1936 and July 1939.

He was the nephew of Heart of Midlothian and Scotland forward Bobby Walker; his sisters were both married to footballers on the same day in 1935 (Jenny to Bobby Hogg of Celtic and Mary to Tom Fenner latterly of Bradford City).
