= 1932–33 Scottish Cup =

Tournament details
- Country: Scotland

Final positions
- Champions: Celtic
- Runners-up: Motherwell

The 1932–33 Scottish Cup was the 55th staging of Scotland's most prestigious football knockout competition. The Cup was won by Celtic who defeated Motherwell in the final.

== Fourth round ==
Team One	Team Two	Score
Celtic	Albion Rovers	1-1 3-1
Hearts	Hibernian	2-0
Motherwell	Kilmarnock	3-3 8-3
Clyde	Stenhousemuir	3-2

== Semi-finals ==
18 March 1933

Celtic	0 – 0	Hearts

Hampden Park, Glasgow
Attendance: 87,000
Referee: T. Dougray

18 March 1933

Motherwell	2 – 0	Clyde
MacFadyen 82'; Ferrier 85'

Ibrox Park, Glasgow
Attendance: 25,000
Referee: P. Craigmyle

=== Replays ===
22 March 1933

Celtic	2 – 1	Hearts
McGrory; A. Thomson 75'		White 84'

Hampden Park, Glasgow
Attendance: 63,756
Referee: T. Dougray

== Final ==
15 April 1933

Celtic	1 – 0	Motherwell
McGrory

Hampden Park, Glasgow
Attendance: 102,339

=== Teams ===
Celtic:
GK	Joe Kennaway
RB	Bobby Hogg
LB	Peter McGonagle
RH	Peter Wilson
CH	Jimmy McStay
LH	Chic Geatons
OR	Bertie Thomson
IR	Alec Thomson
CF	Jimmy McGrory
IL	Charlie Napier
OL	Hugh O'Donnell

Motherwell:
GK	Allan McClory
RB	Jimmy Crapnell
LB	Ben Ellis
RH	Hugh Wales
CH	John Blair
LH	Tommy McKenzie
OR	John Murdoch
IR	John McMenemy
CF	Willie MacFadyen
IL	George Stevenson
OL	Bob Ferrier

== See also ==
- 1932–33 in Scottish football
- 1931 Scottish Cup Final (played between same teams)
