= Willie Gallacher (footballer) =

Scottish footballer

Personal information
- Date of birth: 29 June 1919
- Place of birth: Renfrew, Scotland
- Date of death: 16 October 1982 (aged 63)
- Position: Inside forward

Senior career*
Years	Team	Apps	(Gls)
- St Anthony's
1946–1949	Celtic	29	(0)
1949–1950	Falkirk	4	(0)
1950–1952	Ayr United	23	(6)
1952–1953	St Johnstone	7	(0)
- Inverness Thistle
Total		63	(6)
- * Club domestic league appearances and goals

William Gallacher (29 June 1919 – 16 October 1982) was a Scottish professional footballer who played as an inside forward.

== Career ==
Born in Renfrew, Gallacher's career as a footballer was fairly short due to the interruption of World War II, in which he served in the Royal Engineers. He played for St Anthony's (Junior grade), Celtic, Falkirk, Ayr United, St Johnstone and Inverness Thistle.

His brother was fellow footballer Tommy Gallacher. They were the sons of Patsy Gallacher, one of Celtic's legendary players who also spent time at Falkirk. A nephew, Kevin, played for Scotland at the 1998 FIFA World Cup.

The Gallachers are also related to another footballing branch of the family, John Divers and his son of the same name who both played for Celtic.
