= George Brown (footballer, born 1928) =

Scottish footballer (1928–2011)

Personal information
- Full name: George Donaldson Brown
- Date of birth: 8 May 1928
- Place of birth: Airdrie, Scotland
- Date of death: 22 October 2011 (aged 83)
- Place of death: Airdrie, Scotland
- Position: Inside forward

Youth career
- Larkhall Thistle

Senior career*
Years	Team	Apps	(Gls)
1948–1950	Kilmarnock	12	(2)
1950–1951	Airdrieonians	12	(2)
1951	Southport	1	(0)
1951–1953	Stenhousemuir	57	(9)
1953–1955	Hamilton Academical	43	(19)
1955–1956	Clyde	18	(3)
1956–1957	Bradford Park Avenue	17	(2)
- Poole Town
- * Club domestic league appearances and goals

George Donaldson Brown (8 May 1928 – 22 October 2011) was a Scottish footballer. He won the 1955 Scottish Cup with Clyde. He was born in Airdrie. He had a wife, Maureen, and a son of his, Duggie Brown went on to play for Sheffield United. George Brown died on 22 October, 2011.
