= Bob Ferrier (English footballer) =

English footballer and manager (1899–1971)

Personal information
- Full name: Robert Ferrier
- Date of birth: 1899
- Place of birth: Sheffield, England
- Date of death: April 1971 (aged 71–72)
- Place of death: Dumbarton, Scotland
- Height: 5 ft 8 in (1.73 m)
- Position: Outside left

Senior career*
Years	Team	Apps	(Gls)
- Dumbarton Athletic
- Petershill
1917–1937	Motherwell	626	(255)

International career
1922–1930	Scottish League XI	7	(5)

Managerial career
- 1943–1945: Airdrieonians
- 1945–1948: Ayr United
- * Club domestic league appearances and goals

Robert Ferrier (1899 – 1971) was an English footballer who played for Scottish club Motherwell as an outside left. He holds the record for most appearances in the Scottish Football League, and is one of the top ten goalscorers. He was captain of the side that won Motherwell's only league championship to date, in 1931–32, besides playing in two Scottish Cup finals (1931 and 1933, both lost to Celtic). Ferrier represented the Scottish League XI in seven inter-league matches, scoring five goals. After retiring as a player in 1937, he was the Motherwell assistant manager and later managed Airdrieonians and Ayr United.

In October 2021, 104 years after first signing on at Fir Park, it was announced that Ferrier was to be inducted into the Motherwell F.C. Hall of Fame.

== Personal life ==
His father, likewise named Robert and known as Bob, was also a footballer. The older Ferrier achieved success playing for Sheffield Wednesday in the early 1900s. It was during this spell in Yorkshire that his son was born, and although the family moved back to Scotland and young Bob played all his football there, he was ineligible to play for the Scotland national team under the rules of the time due to his birthplace. His son, another Bob, was a sports journalist. Additionally his uncle Willie Speedie (brother of Scottish international Finlay Speedie) and nephew Bob Speedie played for the families' hometown club Dumbarton.

== See also ==
- List of footballers in Scotland by number of league appearances (500+)
- List of footballers in Scotland by number of league goals (200+)
- List of one-club men in association football
- List of Scottish football families
