= Peter McGonagle =

Scottish footballer

Personal information
- Full name: William McGonagle
- Date of birth: 30 April 1905
- Place of birth: Glasgow, Scotland
- Date of death: 20 December 1956 (aged 51)
- Place of death: Cheltenham, England
- Position: Left back

Youth career
- St Joseph's Boys Guild
- Greenhead Thistle

Senior career*
Years	Team	Apps	(Gls)
- Duntocher Hibernian
1926–1936	Celtic	287	(7)
1936–1937	Hamilton Academical	20	(1)
1937–1939	Cheltenham Town		

International career
1930–1934	Scottish Football League XI	5	(1)
1933–1934	Scotland	6	(0)
- * Club domestic league appearances and goals

William "Peter" McGonagle (30 April 1905 – 20 December 1956) was a Scottish footballer who played mainly for Celtic at club level and also played for the Scotland national team, as a left back.

== Club career ==
Born in Glasgow but adopted as a baby by a family from Hamilton, McGonagle joined Celtic from Duntocher Hibernian in October 1926. He started as a left half but converted to left back. He made his Celtic debut against Falkirk on 27 August 1927.

His Celtic career, often blighted with incidents, came to an end in the summer of 1936 when he was released after playing 324 Scottish Football League and Scottish Cup games, scoring 8 goals. One such incident occurred in a game against Rangers on New Year's Day 1935, when McGonagle was infuriated by a late challenge on Joe Kennaway from Rangers forward Jimmy Smith, and with Kennaway receiving treatment and Smith sat in the penalty area, the enraged McGonagle picked up the match ball and bounced it off Smith's head. McGonagle was sent off for his actions, and for some Celtic directors it was an indiscretion too far; from that moment his days at Parkhead looked numbered, and understudy John Morrison gradually took over the position, with McGonagle's final appearance coming in the same fixture a year later.

He later played for a season at hometown club Hamilton Academical, then spent a year in England in the Southern League with Cheltenham Town where he settled after retiring, working as a mechanic.

== International career ==
McGonagle made his Scotland debut against England on 1 April 1933 at the age of 27, and went on to earn six caps. He never scored for Scotland, but missed a penalty kick in a 1–2 defeat by Ireland in his second game on 16 September 1933. His last Scotland cap came against Wales on 21 November 1934. He also represented the Scottish Football League XI (5 caps, 1 goal).

== Personal life ==
McGonagle was the adopted son of former Hamilton Academical player Peter McGonagle (1894–95 season, Scottish Football Alliance), being given the nickname 'Peter' during his school days as a result.

His son Peter McGonagle (1934–2013) was captain of Scotland and Great Britain Water Polo teams.

== Honours ==
Celtic

- Scottish League: 1935–36
- Scottish Cup: 1930–31, 1932–33
- Glasgow Cup: 1927–28, 1929–30, 1930–31

== See also ==
- List of Scotland national football team captains
