= Thomas Fenner (footballer) =

English footballer

Personal information
- Full name: Thomas Fenner
- Date of birth: 12 May 1904
- Place of birth: Uxbridge, England
- Position: Inside forward

Youth career
- Warrington Juniors

Senior career*
Years	Team	Apps	(Gls)
- Cheshire Lines
1924–1927	Wigan Borough	92	(36)
1927–1933	Notts County	158	(60)
1933–1934	Bradford City	7	(3)
- * Club domestic league appearances and goals

Thomas Fenner (born 12 May 1904) was an English professional footballer who played as an inside forward.

== Career ==
Born in Warrington, Fenner played for Wigan Borough, Notts County and Bradford City.

For Bradford City he made seven appearances in the Football League, scoring three goals. He retired due to injury in November 1934.

== Personal life ==
He married the sister of St Mirren and Scotland defender George Walker in 1935.

== Sources ==
- Frost, Terry (1988). Bradford City A Complete Record 1903-1988. Breedon Books Sport. ISBN 0-907969-38-0.
