= John Murdoch (footballer) =

Scottish footballer

Personal information
- Full name: John Livingstone Murdoch
- Date of birth: 6 February 1901
- Place of birth: New Stevenston, Scotland
- Date of death: September 1964 (aged 63)
- Place of death: Corby, England
- Position: Outside right

Youth career
- Clydesdale Wanderers

Senior career*
Years	Team	Apps	(Gls)
1920–1921	Kirkintilloch Rob Roy		
1921–1928	Airdrieonians	152	(27)
1928–1933	Motherwell	142	(50)
1933–1934	Dundee	37	(10)
1934–1935	Dunfermline Athletic	16	(1)
1935–1936	Stewarts & Lloyds Corby	16	(1)
Total		347	(88)

International career
1931	Scotland	1	(0)
- * Club domestic league appearances and goals

John Livingstone Murdoch (6 February 1901 – September 1964) was a Scottish footballer who played as an outside right.

== Career ==
Born in New Stevenston, Murdoch played club football for Airdrieonians, Motherwell, Dundee and Dunfermline Athletic. He won the Scottish league championship with Motherwell in 1931–32, also being involved in four other top-three finishes and playing in two Scottish Cup finals (1931 and 1933) with the Steelmen; earlier he also had a role, though less prominent, in Airdrie's four consecutive runners-up positions, though was not involved in their Scottish Cup win in 1924.

Murdoch made one appearance for Scotland in 1931 against Ireland.
