= Ralph Granville =

Scottish footballer (born 1931)

Personal information
- Full name: Anthony Ralph Granville
- Date of birth: 23 April 1931 (age 95)
- Place of birth: Glasgow, Scotland
- Position: Wing half

Senior career*
Years	Team	Apps	(Gls)
1954–1957	Clyde	20	(1)
1957	Nottingham Forest	0	(0)
1958	Gateshead	2	(0)
- * Club domestic league appearances and goals

Anthony Ralph Granville (born 23 April 1931) is a Scottish former footballer.

Granville won the 1955 Scottish Cup with Clyde, before having spells with Nottingham Forest and Gateshead.
