= Chic Geatons =

Scottish footballer

Personal information
- Full name: Charles Geatons
- Date of birth: 16 July 1907
- Place of birth: Lochgelly, Scotland
- Date of death: 20 June 1970 (aged 62)
- Place of death: Fife, Scotland
- Position: Right-half

Youth career
- Lochgelly Celtic

Senior career*
Years	Team	Apps	(Gls)
1927–1941	Celtic	280	(12)

International career
1932–1938	Scottish Football League XI	5	(0)
- * Club domestic league appearances and goals

Charles "Chic" Geatons (16 July 1907 – 20 June 1970) was a Scottish footballer who played for Celtic, his only club as a professional. He was a Scottish Football League winner twice (1935–36 and 1937–38), and a Scottish Cup winner three times (1931, 1933 and 1937).

He retired as a player in 1941 but returned to the club in 1945 as a coach. Geatons left Celtic in 1950, citing frustration at the club chairman's excessive involvement in team matters.
