= Eric Smith (Scottish footballer) =

Scottish footballer (1934–1991)

- Smith playing for Scotland in 1959

Personal information
- Full name: John Eric Smith
- Date of birth: 29 July 1934
- Place of birth: Glasgow, Scotland-
- Date of death: 12 June 1991 (aged 56)
- Place of death: Dubai, United Arab Emirates
- Position: Right half

Senior career*
Years	Team	Apps	(Gls)
1951-1952	Pollok		
1952-1953	Benburb		
1954–1960	Celtic	95	(12)
1960–1963	Leeds United	65	(3)
1964–1966	Morton	35	(3)
Total		195	(18)

International career
1959	SFL trial v SFA	1	(0)
1959	Scotland	2	(0)

Managerial career
- 1972: Morton
- 1972–1978: Hamilton Academical
- 1978: Sharjah
- 1986–1989: Pezoporikos Larnaca
- * Club domestic league appearances and goals

John Eric Smith (29 July 1934 – 12 June 1991) was a Scottish professional footballer, who played as a right half for Celtic, Leeds United and Greenock Morton in the 1950s and 1960s. He was capped twice for the Scotland national football team and later managed Morton, Hamilton Academical and Sharjah FC.

== Playing career ==
Smith began his professional career at Celtic in the 1954–55 season and gained two caps for the Scotland national football team in 1959. He did not win any major honours during his spell, finishing on the losing side in the 1956 Scottish Cup Final - Celtic won two Scottish League Cups in the period, but Smith was not selected for either final.

He joined Leeds United in 1960 when the club was in decline, and performed heroically during the 1961–62 season when Leeds battled against relegation to the Third Division. Smith's career at Elland Road ended when he suffered a double-fracture of the leg during a home game against Chelsea in September 1962. He joined Morton in 1964 where he played for two seasons and later became manager.

== Managerial career ==
Smith managed Morton briefly in 1972 and then managed Hamilton Academical for five seasons from 1972–73 to 1977–78. He then briefly managed Sharjah FC in the United Arab Emirates in 1978. He then managed Cypriot club Pezoporikos Larnaca from 1986 to 1989. The club won the 1987–88 Cypriot First Division and then entered the 1988–89 European Cup, where they were beaten in the first round by Swedish champions IFK Gothenburg.

== Honours ==
Celtic

- Scottish Cup: Runners-up 1955–56
- Glasgow Charity Cup: 1958–59

Morton

- Renfrewshire Cup: 1965–66

Pezoporikos Larnaca

- Cypriot First Division 1987–88

== Career statistics ==
=== Leeds United ===
Appearances and goals by club and competition
Club	League			FA Cup		League Cup		Total	
Club	Division	Apps	Goals	Apps	Goals	Apps	Goals	Apps	Goals
Leeds United		65	3	3	0	3	0	71	3
