= John Divers (footballer, born 1911) =

Scottish footballer

Personal information
- Date of birth: 6 August 1911
- Place of birth: Clydebank, Scotland
- Date of death: 8 June 1984 (aged 72)
- Place of death: Glasgow, Scotland
- Position: Inside forward

Senior career*
Years	Team	Apps	(Gls)
- Renfrew
1932–1945	Celtic	70	(42)
1945–1947	Morton		
1947–1948	Oldham Athletic	1	(0)
1948–1949	Morton		
1950	Portadown		

International career
1938	Scotland	1	(0)

Managerial career
- 1950: Portadown (player/manager)
- * Club domestic league appearances and goals

John Divers (6 August 1911 – 8 June 1984) was a Scottish footballer, who played for Celtic, Morton, Oldham Athletic and the Scotland national side.

== Career ==
Divers was born in Clydebank, Dunbartonshire. He was a creative, goal-scoring but tough inside left, who joined Celtic from Renfrew Juniors in 1932. He helped the club to win the Scottish league championship in 1937–38 and was also the creative mastermind behind its victory in the Empire Exhibition Trophy of summer 1938, when Celtic beat Everton 1–0 in the final, before winning a Glasgow Cup at the end of the same year. He made 70 League appearances for the club, but played over 200 matches overall including unofficial wartime games (he did not see frontline service, instead working in a reserved occupation in the local shipyards, so was able to continue playing).

He left Celtic for Morton in 1945, moving to Oldham Athletic for several months in 1947 before returning to finish his career with a second spell with Morton between 1948 and 1949. He earned one cap for Scotland, against Ireland in October 1938.

== Family ==
Divers was the nephew of former Celtic and Ireland player Patsy Gallacher, while his son, also named John, played for Celtic and Partick Thistle. His family connections mean he was also related to fellow footballing descendants of Patsy Gallacher: sons Willie and Tommy, and grandsons Brian and Kevin.
