= Bobby Hogg (footballer, born 1914) =

Scottish footballer and manager

Personal information
- Full name: Robert Brown Hogg
- Date of birth: 10 May 1914
- Place of birth: Larkhall, Scotland
- Date of death: 15 April 1975 (aged 60)
- Place of death: Paisley, Scotland
- Position: Right back

Senior career*
Years	Team	Apps	(Gls)
1930–1931	Royal Albert		
1931–1948	Celtic	273	(0)
1948–1949	Alloa Athletic		

International career
1934–1939	Scottish League XI	6	(0)
1937	Scotland	1	(0)
1941	Scotland (wartime)	1	(0)

Managerial career
- 1948–1949: Alloa Athletic
- * Club domestic league appearances and goals

Robert Brown Hogg (born 10 May 1914 – 15 April 1975) was a Scottish football player and manager. He was mainly associated with Celtic, for which he made 575 appearances in all competitions between 1932 and 1948 (including over 200 across seven unofficial wartime seasons), winning two Scottish League titles (1935–36 and 1937–38), two Scottish Cups (1932–33 and 1936–37), plus the Coronation Cup in 1938. After leaving Celtic in 1948, he became player/manager of Alloa Athletic for a short spell.

Hogg represented Scotland once, in a 3–1 victory against Czechoslovakia in 1937. He was also selected six times by the Scottish Football League XI between 1934 and 1939.

He married the sister of St Mirren and Scotland defender George Walker in 1935.
