= Bertie Thomson =

Scottish footballer

Personal information
- Full name: Robert Austin Thomson
- Date of birth: 12 July 1907
- Place of birth: Johnstone, Scotland
- Date of death: 17 September 1937 (aged 30)
- Place of death: Glasgow, Scotland
- Position: Outside right

Senior career*
Years	Team	Apps	(Gls)
1926–1929	Glasgow Perthshire		
1929–1933	Celtic	113	(23)
1933–1934	Blackpool		
1934–1935	Motherwell	8	(1)

International career
1930–1931	Scottish League XI	2	(0)
1931	Scotland	1	(1)
- * Club domestic league appearances and goals

Robert Austin Thomson (12 July 1907 – 17 Sep 1937) was a Scottish footballer, who played for Celtic, Blackpool, Motherwell and Scotland.

== Career ==
=== Club ===
Born in Johnstone, Renfrewshire, Thomson joined Celtic aged 22 from Glasgow Perthshire, traditionally a Junior team but in that era a member of the rival Intermediate Association, a breakaway body protesting the compensatory payments given by senior clubs signing Junior players. With Thomson on an intermediate contract, he and Celtic were taken to court by Perthshire for breach of agreement after his move in 1929.

At Celtic Park, where he was brought in to replace Paddy Connolly as a supplier for prolific goalscorer Jimmy McGrory, Thomson became a popular figure with supporters for his exciting and determined play on the right wing. In the 1931 Scottish Cup Final against Motherwell, his run and cross set up a late equalising goal to force a replay, and in the second match he scored twice in a 4–2 victory. He was in the side which won the trophy again in 1933 with a 1–0 win over the same opposition.

However, an excessive lifestyle off the field caused problems with his fitness and form, and a resulting dispute with the club management led to his departure soon after that second cup win. Following a short spell in English football with Blackpool, he returned to Scotland with Motherwell but again suffered from physical problems and retired from the game aged 27.

=== International ===
He gained one full cap for Scotland in October 1931, a 3–2 win over Wales in the British Home Championship, in which he scored the second goal. He made his second and last appearance for the Scottish League XI a week later, having first played for them a year earlier.

== Death and personal life ==
Thomson died suddenly from heart failure in 1937, aged 30, leaving a wife and two young children.

He was not related to Celtic teammates and fellow Scotland internationals Alec Thomson (an inside forward who was his partner on the right flank in over 100 matches) or John Thomson (a goalkeeper who died from a head injury during a match aged 22).
