= 1932–33 Scottish Division One =

34th season of top-tier football league in Scotland

Scottish Division One
- Season: 1932–33
- Champions: Rangers
- Relegated: Morton; East Stirlingshire

The 1932–33 Scottish Division One season was won by Rangers by three points over nearest rival Motherwell. Morton and East Stirlingshire finished 19th and 20th respectively and were relegated to the 1933–34 Scottish Division Two.

== League table ==
Pos	Team	Pld	W	D	L	GF	GA	GD	Pts
1	Rangers	38	26	10	2	113	43	+70	62
2	Motherwell	38	27	5	6	114	53	+61	59
3	Heart of Midlothian	38	21	8	9	84	51	+33	50
4	Celtic	38	20	8	10	75	44	+31	48
5	St Johnstone	38	17	10	11	70	55	+15	44
6	Aberdeen	38	18	6	14	85	58	+27	42
7	St Mirren	38	18	6	14	73	60	+13	42
8	Hamilton Academical	38	18	6	14	90	78	+12	42
9	Queen's Park	38	17	7	14	78	79	−1	41
10	Partick Thistle	38	17	6	15	75	55	+20	40
11	Falkirk	38	15	6	17	70	70	0	36
12	Clyde	38	15	5	18	69	75	−6	35
13	Third Lanark	38	14	7	17	70	80	−10	35
14	Kilmarnock	38	13	9	16	72	86	−14	35
15	Dundee	38	12	9	17	60	77	−17	33
16	Ayr United	38	13	4	21	62	95	−33	30
17	Cowdenbeath	38	10	5	23	65	111	−46	25
18	Airdrieonians	38	10	3	25	55	102	−47	23
19	Morton	38	6	9	23	49	97	−48	21
20	East Stirlingshire	38	7	3	28	55	115	−60	17

Source: RSSSF

== Results ==
Home \ Away	ABE	AIR	AYR	CEL	CLY	COW	DND	EST	FAL	HAM	HOM	KIL	MOR	MOT	PAR	QPA	RAN	STJ	STM	THI
Aberdeen		2–0	5–0	1–0	8–1	6–2	3–2	1–3	8–2	2–1	3–0	7–1	6–0	1–1	0–0	3–4	1–1	0–0	5–1	1–0
Airdrieonians	2–0		3–2	0–3	5–2	1–2	3–0	8–1	1–0	2–1	2–7	2–1	2–1	1–4	0–1	1–1	1–2	1–1	1–3	1–2
Ayr United	3–1	4–2		0–1	3–1	3–2	6–0	4–2	0–1	0–1	1–1	2–3	0–1	2–6	2–0	4–3	3–3	2–0	1–0	1–0
Celtic	3–0	2–1	4–1		2–1	3–0	3–2	3–0	0–1	0–3	3–2	0–0	7–1	4–1	1–2	2–0	1–1	5–0	0–0	4–2
Clyde	2–0	6–0	2–0	0–2		2–1	0–3	4–3	3–1	7–2	0–1	0–1	2–1	2–3	1–0	6–2	0–5	2–3	2–1	1–0
Cowdenbeath	0–3	6–1	6–2	1–5	5–2		4–1	4–3	4–3	1–2	0–0	4–1	0–0	1–4	0–0	0–2	2–3	3–2	1–3	2–1
Dundee	0–2	4–2	1–1	3–0	2–1	4–2		3–0	3–0	1–5	2–2	3–0	2–2	0–3	1–0	2–1	0–3	0–0	1–1	2–2
East Stirlingshire	2–1	1–0	4–0	1–3	2–2	1–1	3–2		1–2	1–5	1–3	2–3	0–3	1–4	2–7	1–1	2–3	1–3	2–1	2–0
Falkirk	2–0	3–1	1–2	1–1	2–1	6–0	0–0	3–0		5–0	3–1	2–2	2–1	2–2	1–2	2–3	1–4	1–1	2–3	7–1
Hamilton Academical	1–0	7–0	3–0	1–1	1–1	10–2	1–2	4–3	2–0		3–2	0–0	2–2	2–3	4–3	3–2	2–4	1–1	4–3	3–2
Heart of Midlothian	3–1	4–0	4–2	1–1	1–1	3–1	1–0	3–1	3–2	6–1		1–0	5–2	2–0	1–2	5–0	1–0	2–1	0–0	3–1
Kilmarnock	4–3	2–4	3–5	2–2	1–2	4–1	2–2	2–1	1–1	3–2	0–0		1–1	1–3	3–0	3–1	2–6	5–4	0–1	6–0
Morton	0–1	4–2	1–1	0–1	0–0	2–2	1–4	3–1	3–4	2–5	1–5	5–2		1–2	2–3	0–2	1–3	2–0	0–1	1–3
Motherwell	2–3	4–1	3–1	4–2	1–0	2–0	6–1	4–1	2–0	4–1	5–1	3–3	7–0		1–2	7–2	1–3	1–0	3–0	6–3
Partick Thistle	1–2	3–0	7–0	3–0	2–3	4–1	4–0	6–3	2–1	1–2	1–2	1–3	2–1	0–1		3–4	0–0	2–2	3–1	2–2
Queen's Park	4–0	0–0	4–1	4–1	1–4	5–0	2–0	6–2	1–3	1–0	2–1	1–2	1–1	4–2	2–1		0–0	3–3	4–2	1–1
Rangers	3–1	5–1	4–1	0–0	2–2	4–1	6–4	4–0	5–1	4–4	4–4	2–0	6–1	2–2	3–0	1–0		3–0	4–0	5–0
St Johnstone	2–2	1–0	4–0	1–0	2–1	3–1	2–1	2–0	1–0	2–0	2–1	6–1	7–1	0–1	2–1	5–2	0–2		3–1	2–2
St Mirren	2–2	7–1	3–1	3–1	2–1	7–1	2–1	3–0	1–2	3–0	0–1	3–2	1–1	2–5	1–1	1–2	2–0	2–0		3–1
Third Lanark	3–0	3–2	5–1	0–4	4–1	3–1	1–1	4–1	4–0	2–1	2–1	3–2	2–0	1–1	0–3	6–0	1–3	2–2	1–3	

Legend: Blue = home team win; Yellow = draw; Red = away team win.
