= John Divers (footballer, born 1940) =

Scottish footballer

Personal information
- Date of birth: 8 March 1940
- Place of birth: Clydebank, Scotland
- Date of death: 23 September 2014 (aged 74)
- Position: Inside forward

Youth career
- Glentyan Thistle

Senior career*
Years	Team	Apps	(Gls)
1956–1966	Celtic	171	(80)
1956–1957	→ Renfrew		
1966–1969	Partick Thistle	30	(5)
Total		201	(85)

International career
1962–1963	Scottish League XI	3	(4)
- * Club domestic league appearances and goals

John Divers (8 March 1940 – 23 September 2014) was a Scottish footballer who played for Celtic and Partick Thistle.

== Playing career ==
=== Club ===
Born in Clydebank, Divers was the son of former Scottish international John Divers and grand-nephew of ex-Celtic player Patsy Gallacher. He played 248 games for Celtic between November 1957 and September 1965. Playing mostly as an inside left, he scored 110 goals for the club, which helped gain him a reputation as a skilful, clever and hard working player.

He contributed to Celtic's nine consecutive league championships in a row by scoring the first goal of that period, away against Dundee United in 1965. After joining Partick Thistle in the early part of the 1966–67 season, he later retired from the Senior game in 1969 to attend Strathclyde University.

=== International ===
Divers was part of a number of Scotland squads (including a 1962 match against Uruguay) but never got onto the field. He played on three occasions for the Scottish League XI, scoring 4 goals.

== Later life ==
Divers spent some of his later life in teaching, spending most of his career in St Patrick's High (where he'd also been a pupil), later Our Lady and St Patrick's High School in Dumbarton. He died in September 2014. His family connections mean he was related to fellow footballing descendants of Patsy Gallacher: sons Willie and Tommy, and grandsons Brian and Kevin.
