= Patsy Gallacher =

Irish association football player

Personal information
- Full name: Patrick Gallacher or Gallagher
- Date of birth: 16 March 1891
- Place of birth: Milford, County Donegal, Ireland
- Date of death: 17 June 1953 (aged 62)
- Place of death: Scotstoun, Glasgow, Scotland
- Height: 1.70 m (5 ft 7 in)
- Position: Inside right

Youth career
- Renfrew St James
- 1911: Clydebank Juniors

Senior career*
Years	Team	Apps	(Gls)
1911–1925	Celtic	432	(186)
1925	New Bedford Whalers		
1926–1932	Falkirk	131	(23)
Total		563	(209)

International career
1913–1924	Scottish Football League XI	2	(0)
1918	Scotland (wartime)	1	(0)
1919–1927	Ireland (IFA)	11	(0)
1927	Scottish FA tour	7	(7)
1931	Irish Free State (FAI)	1	(0)
- * Club domestic league appearances and goals

Patrick Gallacher (16 March 1891 – 17 June 1953) was an Irish footballer, playing in the inside-right position, most noted for his career at Celtic, where he became one of the club's leading goalscorers of all time.

== Early life ==
Patsy was born in a workhouse in Milford, County Donegal. His parents were both originally named Gallagher but at some point the spelling was altered.

Gallacher was three years old when his family moved to Clydebank in Scotland and he played for his first schoolboy team at Our Holy Redeemer's Primary School in the town. Patsy had to organise the team, acting as captain and secretary because every teacher in the school was female and showed little interest in the sport. Patsy remembered his first trophy in the Yoker Athletic Schools' Tournament playing for Holy Redeemer who were the dark horses of the competition. He recalled that the organisers were unwilling to award the cup to a team without an adult manager.

== Club career ==
Patsy joined Benvue, a team in the Clean Speech League, then moved up to the juvenile side, Renfrew St. James. He then moved up again to Clydebank Juniors and began to attract the attention of scouts from senior clubs. They could see his talent which was impressive, but had doubts due to his puny, frail appearance. Despite this he received offers of a trial with Clyde F.C and Celtic. During his trial period he scored twice in a 6–1 defeat of Dumfries and three times in a 5–0 win against a British Army XI.

=== Celtic ===
He was quickly promoted to the Celtic first team and made his debut aged 20 against St Mirren at Parkhead in November 1911. He was to overcome his supposed physical problems in the same way that Garrincha would in years to come, and his resilience and stature earned him the nickname 'The Mighty Atom'.

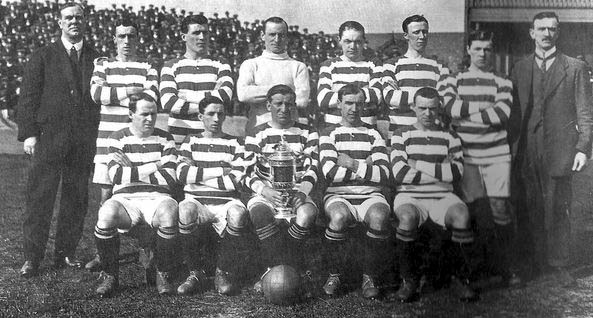
1914 Celtic team photo with the Scottish Cup; Gallacher bottom row, second left

He revitalised Celtic's team, which had slipped to fifth place in the league in 1910–11 as the great team of Jimmy Quinn, Davie Hamilton and Jimmy McMenemy which had won six successive league titles began to tire. Within six months he secured his first winner's medal, scoring once in the 2–0 victory over Clyde in the 1912 Scottish Cup Final.

For much of his time he formed an effective wing partnership with Andy McAtee and in the final years of his spell he helped to bring on a young Jimmy McGrory, who later commented "Many people have asked me how Patsy would have stood up to the rigours of the modern game. He would have strolled through it. There is no present day player in this country that I would put anywhere near his class."

He went on to play for Celtic for 15 years from 1911 to 1925, featuring in 491 games in all competitions. In 464 games in major competitions Patsy scored 195 goals. Today he ranks as Celtic's sixth highest goalscorer behind Jimmy McGrory, Bobby Lennox, Henrik Larsson, Stevie Chalmers and Jimmy Quinn. With Gallacher added to the lineup, Celtic won six Scottish League titles, four Scottish Cups, four Glasgow Cups and eleven Glasgow Charity Cups.

One of his most famous moments came in the 'Patsy Gallacher' Scottish Cup Final of 1925 against Dundee, when he barged from behind in a packed penalty area and somersaulted over the goal line with the ball between his feet into the net for a goal. This last winner's medal came 13 years after his first in 1912.

=== Falkirk ===
In 1926, Celtic 'retired' Patsy without warning. Speculation among his fans was that they wanted to save on his wages, which were considerably higher than those of any other Celtic player of the time (despite the fact that the team included greats such as Jimmy McGrory and Jimmy McStay). Gallacher went on to play for six more years with Falkirk, fuelling speculation among Celtic supporters as to how many more goals he would have scored and trophies lifted had he stayed at Celtic Park. He received a testimonial match in January 1932 between a Celtic-Falkirk XI and a Scottish League XI.

== International career ==
Patsy gathered 12 caps for Ireland in an age when fewer internationals were played, and World War I also led to such games being suspended for several years. On his debut for Ireland at Windsor Park in Belfast against England he became the highest paid international ever. Interest in the Ireland team grew tremendously: 50,000 packed into Windsor Park for his Ireland debut in 1919.

Like many Irish players of his era, he played for both the Belfast-based Irish Football Association side (11 times, with six matches against Scotland), and the Dublin-based Irish Free State team once versus Spain – at 40 years of age, he became their oldest-ever debutant (surpassing Bill Lacey, although Lacey made further appearances up to the age of 41).

Gallacher also represented the Scottish Football League XI twice (both against the Irish League) while at Celtic, and made seven appearances and scored seven goals in a Scottish FA tour of Canada in 1927 while at Falkirk.

== Personal life ==
Gallacher had been apprenticed in the famous local John Brown & Company shipyard prior to joining Celtic and returned to the industry (a reserved occupation) during World War I; in peacetime he was, unusually, permitted by Celtic to be a publican in Renfrew while also playing for them which allowed him to stop working in the shipyard. From 1925 he ran the International Bar in his hometown of Clydebank and concentrated on the licensed trade after retiring from playing professionally aged 41. His wife died in 1929 and Patsy had to raise their six children on his own. Patsy himself died in 1953 and is buried in Arkleston Cemetery in Paisley. In 2007 a memorial plaque was unveiled in Ramelton, with the unveiling ceremony attended by family members, locals and some of Celtic's Lisbon Lions team.

Two of his sons Tommy and Willie also became footballers, as did his grandson Kevin, who played for Scotland at 1998 FIFA World Cup. Additionally, his nephew John Divers and John's son of the same name both played for Celtic, and great-granddaughter Amy Gallacher (descendant of Tommy) joined the club's women's team in 2022; she scored the winning goal in the last game of the 2023–24 season which secured the club's first women's league title.

== Honours ==
Celtic

- Scottish First Division (6): 1913–14, 1914–15, 1915–16, 1916–17, 1918–19, 1921–22
- Scottish Cup (4): 1911–12, 1913–14, 1922–23, 1924–25
- Glasgow Cup (4): 1915–16, 1916–17, 1919–20, 1920–21

Individual

- Scottish Football Hall of Fame inductee: 2019

== See also ==
- List of footballers in Scotland by number of league appearances (500+)
- List of footballers in Scotland by number of league goals (200+)
- List of Scottish football families
