= Frank Meechan =

Scottish footballer

Personal information
- Full name: Francis Meechan
- Date of birth: 27 October 1929
- Place of birth: Condorrat, Scotland
- Date of death: 20 August 1976 (aged 46)
- Place of death: Cumbernauld, Scotland
- Position: Defender

Senior career*
Years	Team	Apps	(Gls)
–	Petershill		
1952–1958	Celtic	86	(0)
1958–1959	→ Stirling Albion (loan)	6	(0)

International career
–	Scottish League XI		
- * Club domestic league appearances and goals

Francis Meechan (27 October 1929 – 20 August 1976) was a Scottish footballer who played as a defender for Petershill, Celtic and Stirling Albion. He played for Celtic in three Scottish Cup Finals in the mid-1950s, beating Aberdeen in 1954 (as part of a double with the Scottish Football League, the club's first championship since the 1930s) followed by defeats at the hands of Clyde in 1955 and Hearts in 1956.

After retiring as a player Meechan became a scout for Celtic in a link with his local club Cumbernauld United (where a teenage Kenny Dalglish was farmed out for experience during the period), but died aged 46 – the Frank Meechan Memorial Charity Match in Cumbernauld was played in his memory.
