= Public Contracts Scotland =

National advertising website for Scottish public sector organisations

Public Contracts Scotland was established as the national advertising website for Scottish public sector organisations to post Official Journal of the European Union (OJEU) notices (contracts over the European directive thresholds) and low value contracts (commonly known as sub-threshold ) notices on the website and make subsequent awards. Since 1 January 2021 it reflects Scottish public procurement legislation, as the UK has left the European Union. The site also allows contracting authorities to invite suppliers to submit quotations (Quick Quotes) electronically via the website's secure tender postbox.

== Background ==
Public Contracts Scotland was created as a result of John McClelland's 2006 Review of Public Procurement in Scotland. The McClelland report called for a single public sector "electronic portal" to be established as a part of the Scottish Government’s Public Procurement Reform Programme. As a result, in October 2008 Public Contracts Scotland was launched. The site provides suppliers with easy access to all essential information on public sector contract opportunities, encouraging a competitive market environment generating a better deal for the taxpayer. The site provides purchasers with a centralised system to advertise all types of contracts to thousands of registered suppliers.

Public Contracts Scotland was launched by John Swinney MSP, Cabinet Secretary for Finance and Sustainable Growth, at the National Procurement conference in October 2008.

Public Contracts Scotland is managed by Proactis Tenders Ltd. (previously known as Millstream Associates Ltd.) which also develops and manages the tender alert service Tenders Direct as well as the national public procurement websites for Wales (and previously Ireland and Norway).

== Legislation ==
Legislation governs how Scottish public bodies, including the Scottish Government, buy goods, works and services.

The Procurement Reform (Scotland) Act 2014 built on the work achieved in the reform of public procurement, providing direction to public bodies and setting out procurement responsibilities and accountabilities.

It is Scottish Government policy for all contracting authorities in Scotland to use Public Contracts Scotland. This includes Scottish Local Authorities, NHS Scotland, the Scottish Government and Scottish Government Family, higher/further education institutes and emergency services. In total the public sector in Scotland procures over £13.3bn worth of goods and services every year, with approximately 150 public bodies each spending over £1m every year, sixty per cent of which spend more than £25 million a year on goods and services (92% total spending). Public Contracts Scotland provides a connection for private businesses to access contract opportunities from public sector purchasers.

== PCS-Tender website ==
The Public Contracts Scotland Tender website is also known as PCS-Tender and PCS-T. Public Contracts Scotland Tender is Scotland's national eTendering system, and is centrally funded by the Scottish Government. The system is a secure website for buyers and suppliers to manage tender exercises and bids online. This site is managed by BravoSolution UK Limited.

== Free tender training and support in Scotland ==
The Scottish Government supports businesses in learning how to bid through the Public Contracts Scotland and Public Contracts Scotland Tender websites through the Supplier Development Programme.

The Supplier Journey provides guidance to businesses on how to bid for public sector contracts.

The Procurement Journey provides guidance to public sector buyers which procure goods, services and care and support services in Scotland.
