= John Divers (footballer, born 1931) =

Scottish footballer

Personal information
- Full name: John Rice Divers
- Date of birth: 24 November 1931
- Place of birth: Glasgow, Scotland
- Date of death: 9 November 2005 (aged 73)
- Place of death: Glasgow, Scotland
- Position: Winger

Youth career
- Ashfield

Senior career*
Years	Team	Apps	(Gls)
1953–1956	Clyde	31	(3)
1956–1957	Exeter City	12	(1)
1957–1958	East Stirlingshire	23	(1)
- * Club domestic league appearances and goals

John Rice Divers (24 November 1931 – 9 November 2005) was a Scottish footballer.

Divers was born in Glasgow and began his career with junior side Ashfield, before transferring to Clyde. He stayed there for 3 years, and he won the 1955 Scottish Cup. He later played for Exeter City and East Stirlingshire.
