= John Thomson (footballer, born 1909) =

Scottish footballer

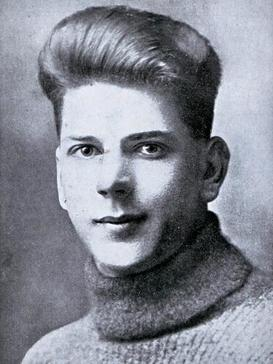

Personal information
- Full name: John Thomson
- Date of birth: 28 January 1909
- Place of birth: Kirkcaldy, Scotland
- Date of death: 5 September 1931 (aged 22)
- Place of death: Glasgow, Scotland
- Height: 1.75 m (5 ft 9 in)
- Position: Goalkeeper

Senior career*
Years	Team	Apps	(Gls)
1924–1925	Bowhill Rovers		
1925–1926	Wellesley Juniors		
1926–1931	Celtic	164	(0)

International career^{‡}
1928–1930	Scottish League XI	4	(0)
1930–1931	Scotland	4	(0)
- * Club domestic league appearances and goals as of 23 July 2008 ‡ National team caps and goals as of 23 July 2008

John Thomson (28 January 1909 – 5 September 1931) was a Scottish footballer who played as a goalkeeper for Celtic and the Scotland national football team. He died as a result of an accidental collision with Rangers player Sam English during an Old Firm match at Ibrox.

== Club career ==
=== Early life and career ===
Thomson was born on 28 January 1909 in Kirkcaldy, to John and Jean Thomson. He grew up in the mining community of Cardenden in Fife, and was educated at Denend Primary School and Auchterderran Higher Grade School. By the time he reached High School he was already seen as a talented goalkeeper and was part of the Auchterderran school team that won the Lochgelly Times Cup.

At the age of 14, he became an oncost worker at Bowhill Colliery, where his father also worked. He worked 300 yards below the pithead surface, uncoupling the chain clips of the waggons that carried the coal up from the mine. During the 1924–25 season, Thomson played for Bowhill Rovers in the Fife Junior Football League. The following season, he moved to Wellesley Juniors, where his talent was spotted by the local press who predicted that he would become a very good goalkeeper in future.

=== Celtic ===
Celtic manager Willie Maley sent his chief scout Steve Callaghan to watch the Denbeath Star goalkeeper but instead Callaghan came back with a rave review about Thomson. After watching him playing against Denbeath Star on 20 October 1926, Celtic signed 17-year-old Thomson for £10. On 5 February 1927, Celtic beat Brechin City 6–3, but Maley was concerned by the fact his first choice 'keeper, Peter Shevlin, had conceded three soft goals so decided to give 18-year-old Thomson a chance in the next game, which was against Dundee. He kept his place in the team after this match, and helped Celtic to finish second in the Scottish First Division. He also played in Celtic's 1927 Scottish Cup Final victory as they beat East Fife 3–1. The following season, after an Old Firm match where Celtic played against their rivals Rangers at Ibrox Park, Thomson received widespread praise from the press following an "immense" performance. On 5 February 1930, Thomson was seriously injured in a game against Airdrieonians: he broke his jaw, fractured several ribs, damaged his collar bone, and lost two teeth when making a diving save. On 11 April 1931, Thomson won the second medal of his career as Celtic beat Motherwell 4–2 in the 1931 Scottish Cup Final. The first match had finished in a 2–2 draw and over 105,000 spectators watched the replay at Hampden Park.

== International career ==
John made his first international appearance against France on 18 May 1930 in a 2–0 win. This was in the time before caps were awarded for matches other than Home Internationals, so Thomson was awarded his first physical cap against Wales on 25 October 1930. He made another two international appearances for Scotland, keeping clean sheets against Ireland and England.

== Style of play ==
Thomson was very small and thin, standing at only 5 ft 9 in (1.75 m). Many people thought that he did not look like a goalkeeper due to his diminutive stature, and small hands. Although his team-mate Jimmy McGrory described him as having "artists hands".

In his biography of Thomson, author Tom Greig described him as having strong, slender fingers and powerful wrists and forearms. Saying that "The combination of these physical attributes was the basis for his extraordinary shot-saving and clutching capabilities." Football historian Robert McElroy, described him as being "graceful, athletic, very brave and courageous". Celtic chairman Desmond White said that Thomson was the best 'keeper he had ever seen, and described him as having "the ability to rise in the air high above the opposition. It was this almost ballet-like ability and agility which, in his tremendous displays, endeared him to the hearts of all Celtic supporters."

== Personal life ==
In 1931, Thomson got engaged to Margaret Finlay and also started making plans to open a tailor shop in Glasgow. He was a member of the Church of Christ, a small Protestant Evangelical church.

He was not related to Celtic teammates and fellow Scotland internationals Alec Thomson (a forward who was also from Fife and joined the club from Wellesley Juniors) or Bertie Thomson (a winger who died aged 30).

== Death ==
On 5 September 1931, Celtic were playing their rivals Rangers at Ibrox Park in Glasgow in front of a crowd of 80,000. Early in the second half Thomson and a Rangers player, Sam English, went for the ball at the same time. Thomson's head collided with English's knee, fracturing his skull and rupturing an artery in his right temple. One source said, "There were gasps in the main stand, a single piercing scream being heard from a horrified young woman"; this was believed to be the scream of 19-year-old Margaret Finlay, who was watching with Jim Thomson (brother of John). Thomson was taken off the field in a stretcher; most people assumed that he was just badly concussed, but a few people who had seen his injuries suspected worse. One Rangers player, James Marshall, also a medical student, said later that as soon as he saw him he gave little chance for his survival, this was also the view of the Celtic team doctor.

After having treatment from the St Andrew's Ambulance Association, he was taken to a stretcher. According to The Scotsman, he was "seen to rise on the stretcher and look towards the goal and the spot where the accident happened". The game ended 0–0. Thomson was taken to the Victoria Infirmary in Glasgow. He had a lacerated wound over the right parietal bones of the skull, causing a depression in his skull 2 in (5 cm) in diameter. At 5:00 pm he suffered a major convulsion. Dr Norman Davidson carried out an emergency operation to try to lower the amount of pressure caused by the swelling brain, but the operation was unsuccessful and he was pronounced dead by 9.25 pm.

=== Tributes ===
His death shocked many people. English, who was deeply traumatised by the event, was totally cleared of any responsibility for the accident. Even at the start of the 21st century Thomson's grave in Bowhill, Fife remains a place of pilgrimage for Celtic fans. On his gravestone it reads "They never die who live in the hearts they leave behind".

Celtic manager Willie Maley wrote of him:

Among the galaxy of talented goalkeepers whom Celtic have had, the late lamented John Thomson was the greatest. A Fifeshire friend recommended him to the Club. We watched him play. We were impressed so much that we signed him when he was still in his teens. That was in 1926. Next year he became our regular goalkeeper, and was soon regarded as one of the finest goalkeepers in the country.

But, alas, his career was to be short. In September 1931, playing against Rangers at Ibrox Park, he met with a fatal accident. Yet he had played long enough to gain the highest honours football had to give. A most likeable lad, modest and unassuming, he was popular wherever he went.

His merit as a goalkeeper shone superbly in his play. Never was there a keeper who caught and held the fastest shots with such grace and ease. In all he did there was the balance and beauty of movement wonderful to watch. Among the great Celts who have passed over, he has an honoured place.

Thomson was known for his agility, bravery, and safe handling; who produced some displays of goalkeeping.

The journalist John Arlott wrote:

A great player who came to the game as a boy and left it still a boy; he had no predecessor, no successor. He was unique

Around 30,000 people went to his funeral in Cardenden (where he lived as a boy) on 9 September 1931. Many of them had walked the journey of 55 miles (89 km) from Glasgow. Another 20,000 turned out at Glasgow Queen Street station to watch two trains set off with two thousand passengers who could afford to pay the four shillings return fare.

Sam English was cleared of any blame in the incident but he was jeered by Scottish fans afterwards and moved south a year later to play with Liverpool. However, he quit the sport altogether in May 1938, he told a friend that since the accident that killed John Thomson he had "seven years of joyless sport".

In recent years, a book called "My Search For Celtic's John", written by Tom Greig, discusses his personal life and the fatal incident. Greig started a petition to persuade the Scottish Football Association to induct John Thomson into the Scottish Football Hall of Fame; in November 2008, this was achieved.

A local committee has also been set up called the John Thomson Memorial Committee. This organisation works to make sure that John's name and achievements are remembered throughout the community and Scotland. Every year children in the Cardenden and Kinglassie districts play for the John Thomson Trophy to help ensure his name is perpetuated.

In 2009, a play written by Celtic historian David Potter was produced by children of the village and performed both in the village itself and at the Scottish Parliament before interested MSPs.

September 2011 marked the 80th anniversary of John's death and the John Thomson Memorial Committee (JTMC) worked in partnership with Celtic Graves Society (CGS) on a "Pilgrimage walk" from Glasgow to Cardenden. The aim was to re-create the walk that many fans took 80 years earlier to attend John's funeral in Cardenden. The walk started on Friday 2 September and arrived in Cardenden on the morning of Sunday 4 September to coincide with the annual John Thomson primary school football tournament which JTMC had organised for nearly thirty years. Following the tournament and a prizegiving ceremony the Pilgrimage walkers attended a wreath-laying ceremony around 4.15 p.m. at Bowhill Cemetery.

A play about John Thomson, written by Brian McGeachan and Gerard McDade was performed at the King's Theatre, Glasgow from 5 to 10 September 2011. The opening night fell on the 80th anniversary of John Thomson's death.

== Honours ==
Celtic

- Scottish Cup: 1927, 1931
- Glasgow Cup: 1927, 1928, 1930

== See also ==
- List of association footballers who died while playing
