= Allan McClory =

Scottish footballer

Personal information
- Date of birth: 11 November 1899
- Place of birth: Armadale, Scotland
- Date of death: 9 July 1983 (aged 83)
- Place of death: Bathgate, Scotland
- Height: 6 ft 0 in (1.83 m)
- Position: Goalkeeper

Senior career*
Years	Team	Apps	(Gls)
–	Harthill Bluebell		
–	Shotts United		
1924–1938	Motherwell	428	(0)
1926	→ Mid-Annandale (loan)		
1938–1939	→ Albion Rovers (loan)	23	(0)
1939–1941	Albion Rovers	0	(0)
1946	Montrose		
1946–1947	Brideville		

International career
1926–1927	Scottish League XI	2	(0)
1926–1934	Scotland	3	(0)
- * Club domestic league appearances and goals

Allan McClory (11 November 1899 – 9 July 1983) was a Scottish footballer who played as a goalkeeper for Harthill Bluebell, Shotts United, Motherwell, Albion Rovers, Montrose and Brideville. The vast majority of his career was spent with Motherwell; he was part of the team which won the club's only Scottish Football League title in 1931–32 (the pinnacle of eight consecutive seasons in which they finished in the top three), and played in two Scottish Cup finals – 1931 and 1933, both lost to Celtic.

McClory represented Scotland three times and the Scottish Football League XI twice.
