= Alec Thomson (footballer) =

Scottish footballer

Personal information
- Date of birth: 14 June 1901
- Place of birth: Buckhaven, Scotland
- Date of death: 12 November 1975 (aged 74)
- Place of death: Larkhall, Scotland
- Position: Inside right

Senior career*
Years	Team	Apps	(Gls)
- Glencraig Celtic
- Wellesley Juniors
1922–1934	Celtic	392	(86)
1923	→ Ayr United (loan)		
1934–1937	Dunfermline Athletic	79	(13)
1937–1938	Wick Academy		

International career
1925–1930	Scottish League XI	4	(0)
1926–1932	Scotland	3	(0)
- * Club domestic league appearances and goals

Alexander Thomson (14 June 1901 – 12 November 1975) was a Scottish footballer who played for Celtic, Ayr United (on loan), Dunfermline Athletic and Scotland, gaining three caps.

He spent 12 years at Celtic, where he was a frequent supplier of chances for the prolific goalscorer Jimmy McGrory, playing 451 times for the club in the Scottish Football League (also being selected for its representative team four times) and Scottish Cup, scoring 99 goals and winning several trophies.

He was not related to Celtic teammates and fellow Scotland internationals John Thomson (a goalkeeper also from Fife and joined the club from Wellesley Juniors, who died from a head injury during a match aged 22) or Bertie Thomson (a winger who died aged 30).
