= Mike Haughney =

Scottish footballer

Personal information
- Full name: Michael Haughney
- Date of birth: 10 December 1925
- Place of birth: Paisley, Scotland
- Date of death: 22 February 2002 (aged 76)
- Place of death: Peoria, Illinois, United States
- Position: Right back

Senior career*
Years	Team	Apps	(Gls)
1946–1949	Newtongrange Star		
1949–1957	Celtic	159	(34)

International career
1954	Scotland B	1	(0)
1954	Scottish League XI	3	(0)
1954	Scotland	1	(0)
- * Club domestic league appearances and goals

Michael Haughney (10 December 1925 – 22 February 2002) was a Scottish footballer who played for Celtic and represented Scotland once.

Haughney served in the Seaforth Highlanders during the Second World War, attaining the rank of captain.
