= Joe Kennaway =

Scottish footballer (1905–1969)

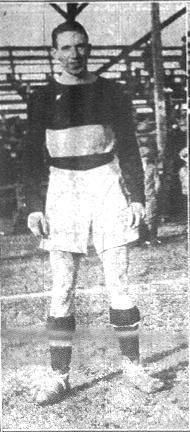

Personal information
- Date of birth: 25 January 1907
- Place of birth: Point St. Charles, Montreal, Quebec, Canada
- Date of death: 7 March 1969 (aged 62)
- Place of death: Johnston, Rhode Island, United States
- Position: Goalkeeper

Senior career*
Years	Team	Apps	(Gls)
1926	Montreal CPR		
1927–1928	Providence	26	(0)
1928–1930	→ Providence Gold Bugs	112	(0)
1931	→ Fall River	17	(0)
1931	→ New Bedford Whalers	3	(0)
1931–1939	Celtic	263	(0)

International career
1926	Canada	1	(0)
1932–1934	Scottish League XI	4	(0)
1933	Scotland	1	(0)

Managerial career
- 1946–1959: Brown University
- * Club domestic league appearances and goals

James T. Kennaway (25 January 1907 – 7 March 1969) was a dual international (Canada and Scotland) football goalkeeper. He began his career in Canada, spent four years in the American Soccer League before finishing his career with Celtic in the Scottish Football League. He later coached the Brown University soccer team from 1946 to 1959.

== Professional career ==
Kennaway began his senior soccer career with amateur Montreal club Montreal CPR, the team of the Canadian Pacific Railway. In January 1927 he signed with Providence of the first professional American Soccer League. In 1928, the club was renamed the Providence Gold Bugs. In 1931, new ownership moved the team to Fall River, Massachusetts and renamed the team Fall River. In the summer of 1931, the team again changed ownership, becoming the New Bedford Whalers. Kennaway remained with the team through all these changes.

An excellent performance in a friendly game for Fall River against a touring Celtic team in 1931 gained the attention of the Scottish side. When their regular goalkeeper John Thomson died during a match later that year, Kennaway was signed by Celtic. Kennaway played from 1931 to 1939 in the Scottish Football League for Celtic. During his stint Celtic won the league championship twice and the Scottish Cup twice (1933 and 1937). He made 295 total appearances for the Bhoys and recorded 83 clean sheets.

== National teams ==
Kennaway was a dual internationalist. He played once for Canada, against the United States in Brooklyn in 1926 on 6 November.

After joining Celtic, he played for Scotland against Austria at Hampden Park in 1933. He would have played more times for Scotland, but the other Home Nations objected to a Canadian playing in goal for Scotland. Kennaway also represented the Scottish League XI four times.

Some reports also state that Kennaway played for the United States, but there is no evidence of this. He did become a US citizen in 1948.

== Post-playing career ==
Kennaway returned to his native Canada upon the outbreak of the Second World War in 1939. His wife being from Providence, the couple settled there after the War. Kennaway went on to coach the soccer team of Brown University from 1946 to 1959, replacing Sam Fletcher.

In 2000, he was inducted into the Canadian Soccer Hall of Fame.

== See also ==
- List of association footballers who have been capped for two senior national teams
- List of Scotland international footballers born outside Scotland
