= 1931–32 Scottish Division One =

33rd season of top-tier football league in Scotland

Scottish Division One
- Season: 1931–32
- Champions: Motherwell
- Relegated: Dundee United; Leith Athletic

The 1931–32 Scottish Division One season was won by Motherwell by five points over nearest rival Rangers. Dundee United and Leith Athletic finished 19th and 20th respectively and were relegated to the 1932–33 Scottish Division Two.

== League table ==
Pos	Team	Pld	W	D	L	GF	GA	GD	Pts
1	Motherwell	38	30	6	2	119	31	+88	66
2	Rangers	38	28	5	5	118	42	+76	61
3	Celtic	38	20	8	10	94	50	+44	48
4	Third Lanark	38	21	4	13	92	81	+11	46
5	St Mirren	38	20	4	14	77	56	+21	44
6	Partick Thistle	38	19	4	15	58	59	−1	42
7	Aberdeen	38	16	9	13	57	49	+8	41
8	Heart of Midlothian	38	17	5	16	63	61	+2	39
9	Kilmarnock	38	16	7	15	68	70	−2	39
10	Hamilton Academical	38	16	6	16	84	65	+19	38
11	Dundee	38	14	10	14	61	72	−11	38
12	Cowdenbeath	38	15	8	15	66	78	−12	38
13	Clyde	38	13	9	16	58	70	−12	35
14	Airdrieonians	38	13	6	19	74	81	−7	32
15	Morton	38	12	7	19	78	87	−9	31
16	Queen's Park	38	13	5	20	59	79	−20	31
17	Ayr United	38	11	7	20	70	90	−20	29
18	Falkirk	38	11	5	22	70	76	−6	27
19	Dundee United	38	6	7	25	40	118	−78	19
20	Leith Athletic	38	6	4	28	46	137	−91	16

== Results ==
Home \ Away	ABE	AIR	AYR	CEL	CLY	COW	DND	DNU	FAL	HAM	HEA	KIL	LEI	MOR	MOT	PAR	QPA	RAN	STM	THI
Aberdeen		2–2	5–1	1–1	1–0	2–0	1–1	5–2	3–1	5–0	1–2	1–1	1–0	1–0	0–1	2–0	1–1	0–0	0–2	1–0
Airdrieonians	2–4		2–2	1–1	3–0	2–1	2–2	4–2	2–1	2–0	3–1	0–2	8–2	5–1	2–2	0–3	2–0	3–0	0–2	2–2
Ayr United	3–2	5–1		2–3	5–0	5–0	1–0	2–0	2–0	1–3	1–2	1–1	6–1	2–1	1–3	0–2	0–1	1–3	2–5	3–4
Celtic	2–0	6–1	4–2		1–1	7–0	0–2	3–2	4–1	6–1	3–0	4–1	6–0	6–3	2–4	1–2	2–2	1–2	1–0	5–0
Clyde	0–1	3–2	3–3	2–1		1–1	0–1	4–1	1–0	1–1	6–2	0–0	3–2	3–0	2–3	2–1	1–0	1–1	2–0	2–4
Cowdenbeath	3–1	1–0	1–1	1–2	3–0		2–1	1–1	2–1	1–0	2–1	7–1	3–0	2–2	1–5	2–0	2–2	1–7	1–3	2–0
Dundee	0–0	4–1	2–2	2–0	1–1	0–4		1–1	2–0	0–3	1–0	1–1	2–2	2–1	2–2	3–1	4–0	4–2	1–2	6–3
Dundee United	0–4	2–7	1–2	1–0	1–1	0–0	0–3		2–2	0–5	0–2	0–0	0–0	3–4	1–6	3–1	0–5	0–5	1–0	3–2
Falkirk	3–0	3–0	2–2	2–0	4–3	2–2	5–2	4–0		2–1	0–2	4–1	9–1	2–2	2–3	1–2	4–1	1–2	1–4	1–3
Hamilton Academical	4–1	3–1	1–3	1–0	6–1	1–1	6–2	4–2	2–2		1–4	1–3	7–0	5–0	2–2	3–1	2–1	1–2	2–0	2–3
Heart of Midlothian	0–0	0–2	1–1	2–1	2–0	3–2	3–1	5–0	2–0	4–2		3–0	4–2	0–0	0–1	0–1	2–0	0–0	2–2	2–3
Kilmarnock	0–2	4–2	5–1	2–3	1–0	3–2	0–0	8–0	2–1	1–1	2–1		6–3	1–0	1–0	3–4	4–1	2–4	3–0	2–1
Leith Athletic	1–2	0–3	4–1	0–3	1–4	1–2	1–0	1–5	2–1	1–4	2–0	3–1		0–2	0–5	1–3	1–3	2–5	0–4	2–1
Morton	1–1	2–1	4–2	3–3	0–1	1–3	4–1	4–2	4–3	1–0	1–2	3–1	9–1		2–2	1–2	6–2	1–2	2–2	5–0
Motherwell	3–0	3–0	6–0	2–2	3–0	3–0	4–0	5–0	4–1	3–1	2–0	4–0	7–1	4–2		1–0	4–1	4–2	4–1	6–0
Partick Thistle	1–0	3–1	2–1	0–2	3–1	5–1	1–3	3–0	1–2	1–6	1–0	4–2	2–2	1–0	0–0		2–1	1–3	2–1	0–0
Queen's Park	1–3	3–1	3–2	0–3	2–3	2–1	0–1	1–2	2–1	1–1	5–2	2–0	3–3	4–1	1–5	2–0		1–6	2–0	1–3
Rangers	4–1	2–1	6–1	0–0	2–2	6–1	4–1	5–0	4–0	1–0	4–2	3–0	4–0	7–3	1–0	4–0	0–1		4–0	6–1
St Mirren	4–2	2–1	4–0	1–2	3–1	1–4	6–1	5–1	3–1	1–0	5–1	2–0	6–3	2–0	0–1	1–1	2–0	0–2		1–1
Third Lanark	2–0	5–2	2–0	3–3	4–2	5–3	6–1	4–1	1–0	4–1	3–4	1–3	2–0	6–2	0–2	3–1	2–1	4–3	4–0	

Legend: Blue = home team win; Yellow = draw; Red = away team win.
