= 1937–38 Scottish Division One =

39th season of top-tier football league in Scotland

Scottish Division One
- Season: 1937–38
- Champions: Celtic
- Relegated: Dundee; Morton

The 1937–38 Scottish Division One season was won by Celtic by three points over nearest rival Heart of Midlothian. Dundee and Morton finished 19th and 20th respectively and were relegated to the 1938–39 Scottish Division Two.

== League table ==
Pos	Team	Pld	W	D	L	GF	GA	GD	Pts
1	Celtic	38	27	7	4	114	42	+72	61
2	Heart of Midlothian	38	26	6	6	90	50	+40	58
3	Rangers	38	18	13	7	75	49	+26	49
4	Falkirk	38	19	9	10	82	52	+30	47
5	Motherwell	38	17	10	11	78	69	+9	44
6	Aberdeen	38	15	9	14	74	59	+15	39
7	Partick Thistle	38	15	9	14	68	70	−2	39
8	St Johnstone	38	16	7	15	78	81	−3	39
9	Third Lanark	38	11	13	14	68	73	−5	35
10	Hibernian	38	11	13	14	57	65	−8	35
11	Arbroath	38	11	13	14	58	79	−21	35
12	Queen's Park	38	11	12	15	59	74	−15	34
13	Hamilton Academical	38	13	7	18	81	76	+5	33
14	St Mirren	38	14	5	19	58	66	−8	33
15	Clyde	38	10	13	15	68	78	−10	33
16	Queen of the South	38	11	11	16	58	71	−13	33
17	Ayr United	38	9	15	14	66	85	−19	33
18	Kilmarnock	38	12	9	17	65	91	−26	33
19	Dundee	38	13	6	19	70	74	−4	32
20	Morton	38	6	3	29	64	127	−63	15

Source: RSSSF

== Results ==
Home \ Away	ABE	ARB	AYR	CEL	CLY	DND	FAL	HAM	HOM	HIB	KIL	MOR	MOT	PAR	QOS	QPA	RAN	STJ	STM	THI
Aberdeen		3–0	4–0	1–1	3–2	2–3	1–2	1–0	0–0	5–0	2–1	4–1	4–0	3–1	2–3	1–1	0–3	4–0	4–0	1–0
Arbroath	3–3		4–0	2–0	1–2	0–3	0–1	2–0	3–5	3–3	2–1	2–2	2–1	1–1	2–2	2–2	1–1	2–0	2–1	3–2
Ayr United	4–1	0–1		1–1	3–3	0–0	2–3	2–3	2–4	1–1	4–2	6–2	3–3	1–1	1–0	6–2	1–1	3–1	1–1	1–1
Celtic	5–2	4–0	1–1		3–1	3–0	2–0	4–2	2–1	3–0	8–0	4–0	4–1	6–0	2–2	4–3	3–0	6–0	5–1	1–1
Clyde	2–1	6–1	0–0	1–6		3–2	2–4	2–0	1–3	1–1	2–2	7–1	2–2	1–1	0–0	5–0	1–1	1–2	1–1	3–3
Dundee	0–1	1–0	5–1	2–3	4–1		1–4	3–0	0–2	1–2	1–2	2–2	2–2	5–3	4–1	2–0	6–1	6–1	0–0	2–1
Falkirk	4–1	2–2	1–1	3–0	1–2	5–0		4–5	4–2	0–0	2–2	6–1	0–1	2–1	1–4	2–0	0–1	3–1	0–2	3–1
Hamilton Academical	0–1	2–2	0–3	1–2	3–1	4–0	1–2		2–3	4–0	4–2	5–0	1–3	4–2	3–1	1–1	2–2	8–3	0–1	3–1
Heart of Midlothian	2–1	4–1	7–0	2–4	0–0	2–1	1–0	2–1		3–2	5–1	2–1	2–0	3–0	0–0	2–0	3–2	2–1	4–0	2–1
Hibernian	1–1	5–0	3–0	0–3	6–3	2–1	2–4	1–1	2–2		1–1	4–2	1–1	2–1	2–0	0–2	0–0	2–2	2–1	2–2
Kilmarnock	3–3	2–1	2–1	2–1	2–1	3–1	2–2	2–2	3–1	0–3		3–0	0–2	1–3	1–1	1–3	2–1	2–2	0–3	4–2
Morton	3–5	4–5	7–3	2–3	1–3	0–2	1–1	2–6	1–2	2–4	4–2		4–1	1–2	2–5	1–2	2–3	3–2	3–1	1–3
Motherwell	2–1	5–1	4–3	1–2	1–0	1–1	3–2	0–1	3–3	1–0	4–3	4–1		1–1	5–1	3–0	1–1	3–1	3–2	4–4
Partick Thistle	3–1	0–0	6–2	1–6	4–1	1–0	2–1	4–3	3–1	4–0	3–0	1–3	3–0		1–2	3–2	1–1	1–4	3–2	1–3
Queen of the South	1–0	0–1	0–1	2–2	1–1	2–2	2–3	3–1	2–3	3–2	3–1	1–0	0–3	0–0		1–3	0–2	2–3	1–0	2–4
Queen's Park	1–1	1–1	1–1	0–3	1–1	3–1	1–5	2–1	1–4	1–1	1–1	5–1	1–3	1–1	3–3		0–3	2–0	4–0	4–1
Rangers	2–2	3–1	2–2	3–1	1–0	6–0	0–0	2–2	0–3	2–0	4–1	3–1	2–1	1–3	2–3	2–1		2–2	4–0	3–0
St Johnstone	1–1	2–2	4–1	1–2	2–1	4–2	0–0	6–3	1–2	2–0	6–2	3–2	2–2	3–1	3–1	1–2	1–5		3–0	2–0
St Mirren	2–1	4–1	1–2	1–3	6–1	2–1	0–3	3–1	1–1	1–0	0–2	7–0	3–0	1–0	4–2	4–1	1–1	0–1		1–4
Third Lanark	2–0	1–1	2–2	1–1	2–3	4–3	2–2	1–1	3–0	1–0	2–4	3–0	5–3	1–1	1–1	1–1	1–2	0–5	1–0	

Legend: Blue = home team win; Yellow = draw; Red = away team win.
