= List of Celtic F.C. players =

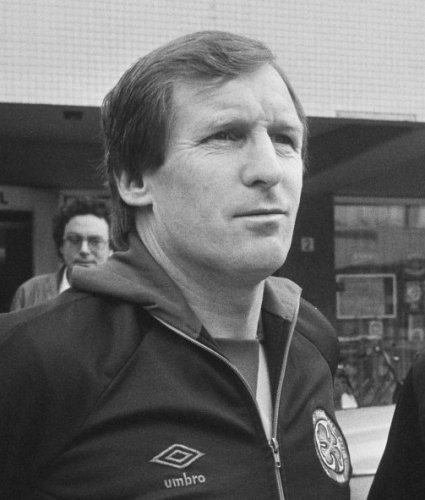
Billy McNeill has made the most appearances for Celtic in major competitions, and also captained the side from 1963 up to his retirement from playing in 1975. McNeill went on to manage Celtic in two spells during the 1980s.

Celtic Football Club (/ˈsɛltɪk/) is a Scottish professional football club based in Parkhead, Glasgow. The club was founded in 1887 and played their first match in May 1888, a friendly match against Rangers. The club played their first competitive match in September 1888, when they entered the first round of the 1888–89 Scottish Cup. Since playing their first competitive match, more than 200 players have made at least 100 appearances (including substitute appearances); those players are listed here. Other players who have made fewer appearances are also included where they are regarded as having played a significant role for the club, with the reason for their inclusion indicated in the Notes column.

Celtic's record appearance-maker is Billy McNeill, who made a total of 790 appearances in major competitions over an 18-year playing career. Alec McNair holds the record at Celtic for most league appearances, and is also the oldest player to have competed for the club. Jimmy McGrory is the club's top goalscorer with 472 goals in major competitions. He is also the record goalscorer in British football, with a total of 550 goals in competitive first class matches. Henrik Larsson has more appearances for Celtic than any other player from outwith the British Isles. He is also the club's third highest goalscorer of all time, behind McGrory and Bobby Lennox, with 242 goals in all competitions. Jimmy Johnstone, part of Celtic's European Cup winning Lisbon Lions team alongside McNeill and Lennox, was voted by Celtic supporters in 2002 as the club's greatest ever player.

James Kelly was the club's first ever captain, playing in the club's inaugural game against Rangers in 1888. He later served as a director and then as chairman. He effectively founded the Kelly dynasty of directors at Celtic, who by and large controlled the club until 1994. Other club captains also went on to important roles at Celtic after the end of their playing careers, with Jimmy McStay, Jimmy McGrory, Jock Stein, Billy McNeill, Davie Hay and Neil Lennon all going on to manage the side. Scott Brown, who played 620 games for the club and was captain throughout the 2010s, is also the Celtic player to have captained the Scotland international team the most times. Paul McStay, who captained Celtic during the 1990s, has won the most caps for Scotland whilst at Celtic with 76 appearances, whilst Pat Bonner of the Republic of Ireland has made the most appearances for his country whilst a Celtic player (80 caps).

== Notable players ==
Players are listed according to the date they first signed with the club. Appearances and goals are for competitive first-team matches in Scottish League, (Note: FitbaStats lists the 1905 league play-off outwith League statistics. This match has been added to the appearance and goal statistics in this list for the players who took part.) Scottish Cup, Scottish League Cup and European Competition only; minor competitions (i.e. the Glasgow Cup) and wartime matches are excluded. Substitute appearances are included.

For a full list of all Celtic players with Wikipedia articles see Category:Celtic F.C. players. For player appearance records see Celtic F.C. records.

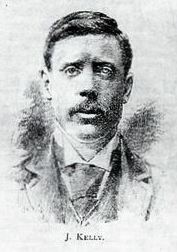
James Kelly played in Celtic's inaugural match against Rangers in 1888 and was the club's first captain. He later served as a director and a brief spell as chairman.

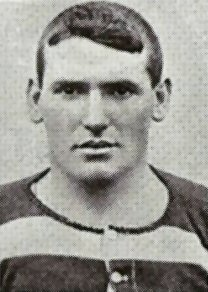
Jimmy Quinn scored a hat trick in Celtic's win over Rangers in the 1904 Scottish Cup Final, and went on to become one of the club's most prolific goalscorers.

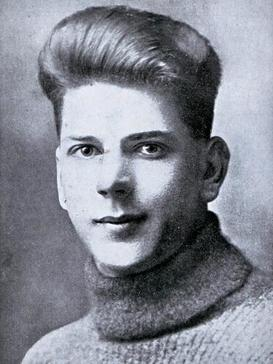
John Thomson played over 200 games for Celtic prior to his death at 22 years old following an on-field head injury

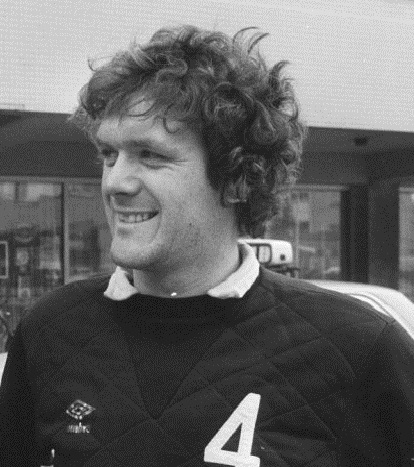
Roy Aitken made 672 appearances for Celtic in major competitions. He also captained the club to a league and cup double in their centenary year of 1988.

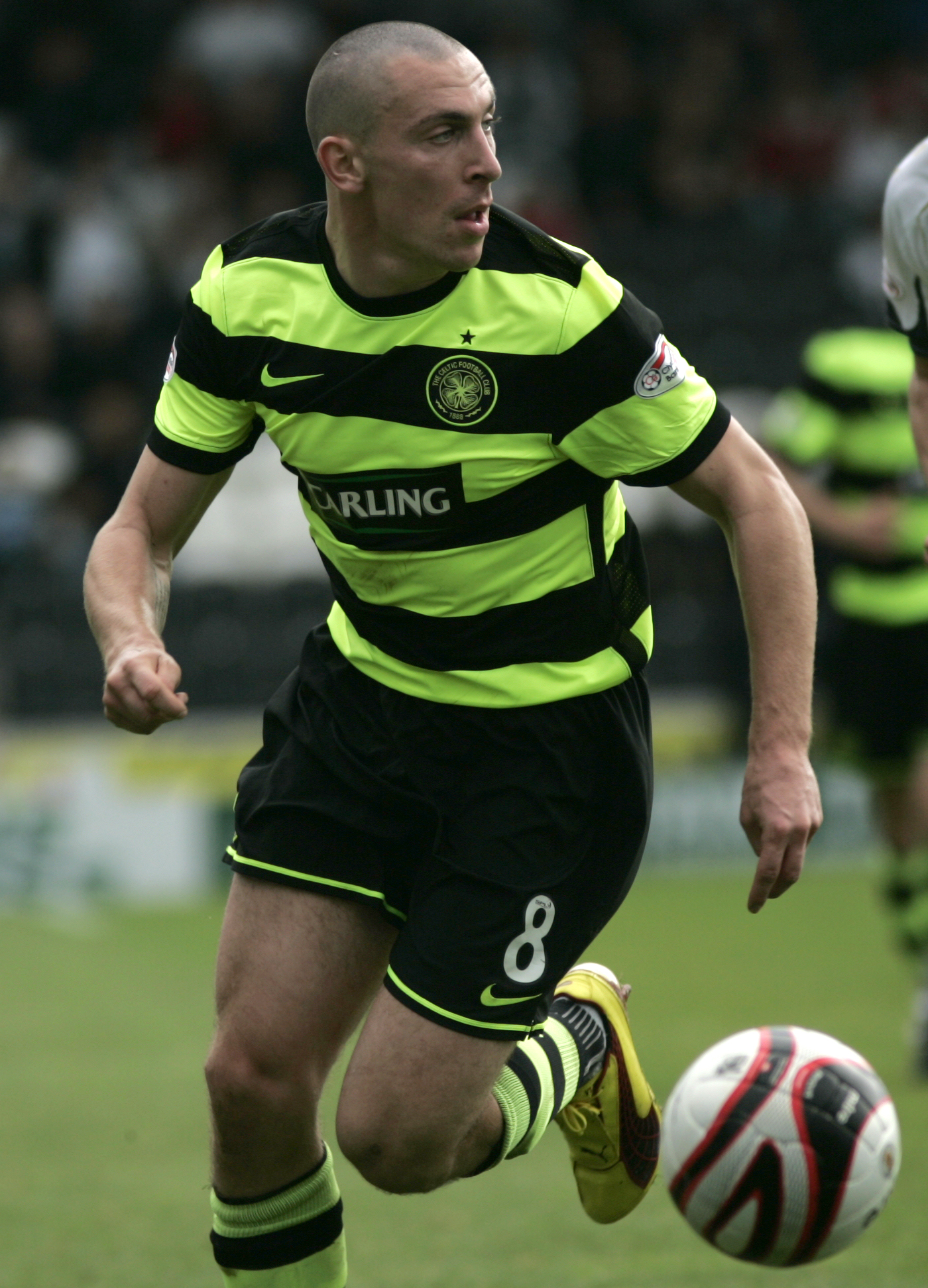
Scott Brown made 620 appearances for Celtic and captained the team for over a decade.

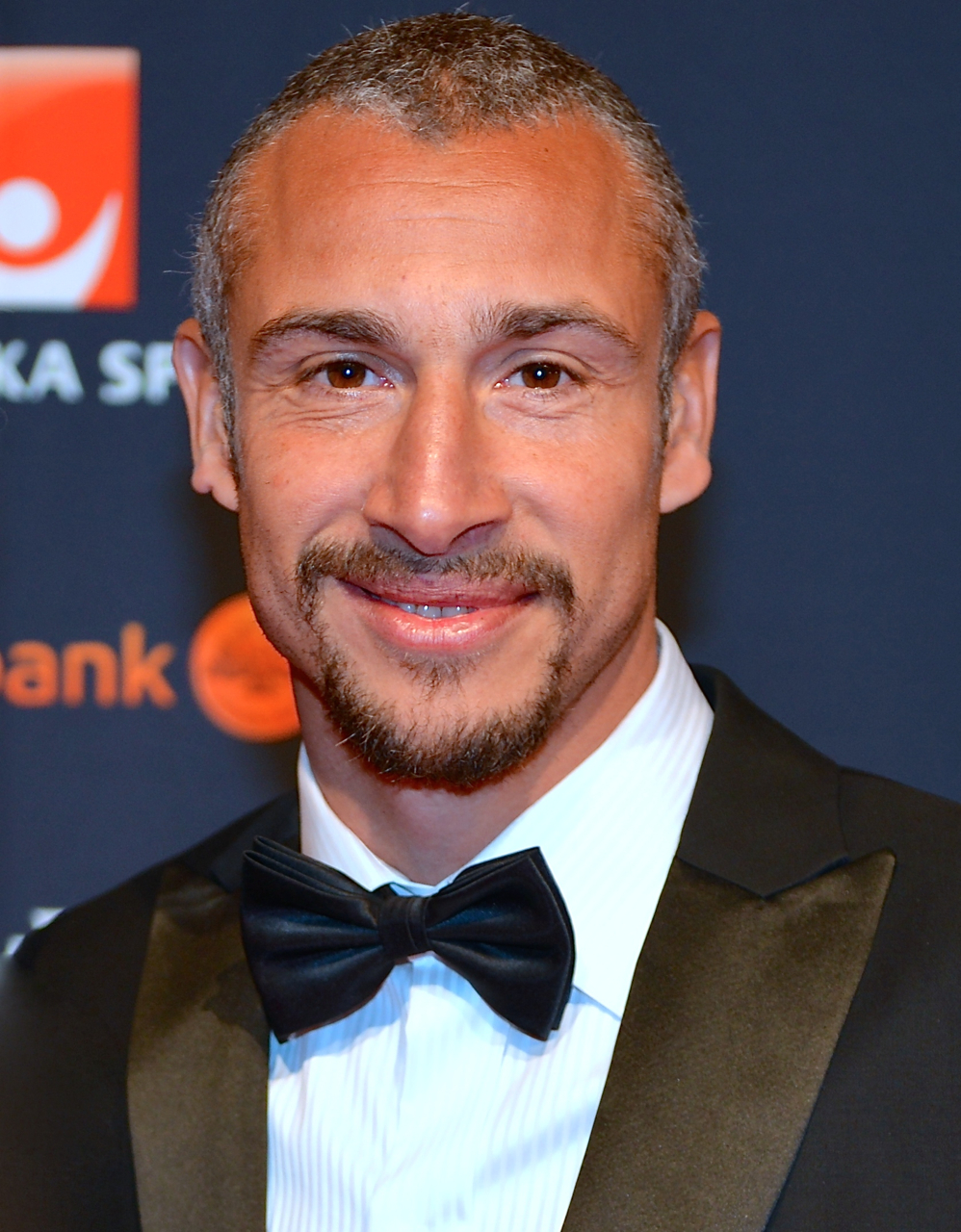
Henrik Larsson has more appearances for Celtic than any other overseas player. He is also the club's third highest goalscorer of all time.

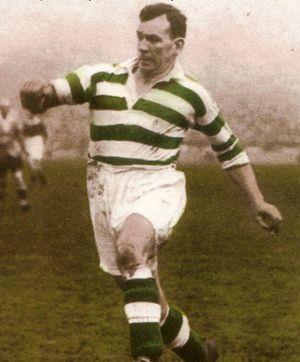
Jimmy McGrory is the record goalscorer in British football, with a total of 550 goals in competitive first class matches.

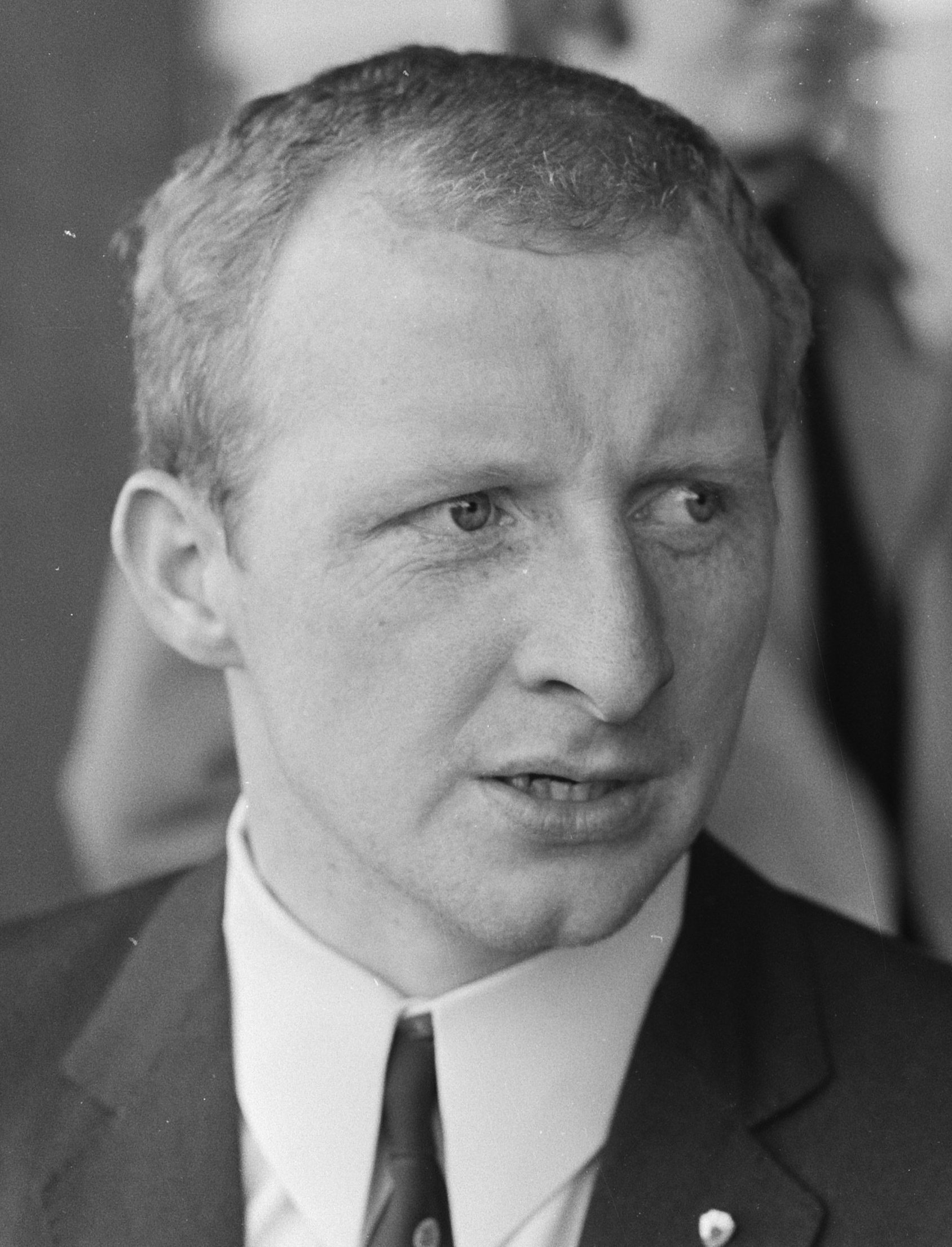
Jimmy Johnstone was voted by Celtic supporters in 2002 as the club's greatest ever player.

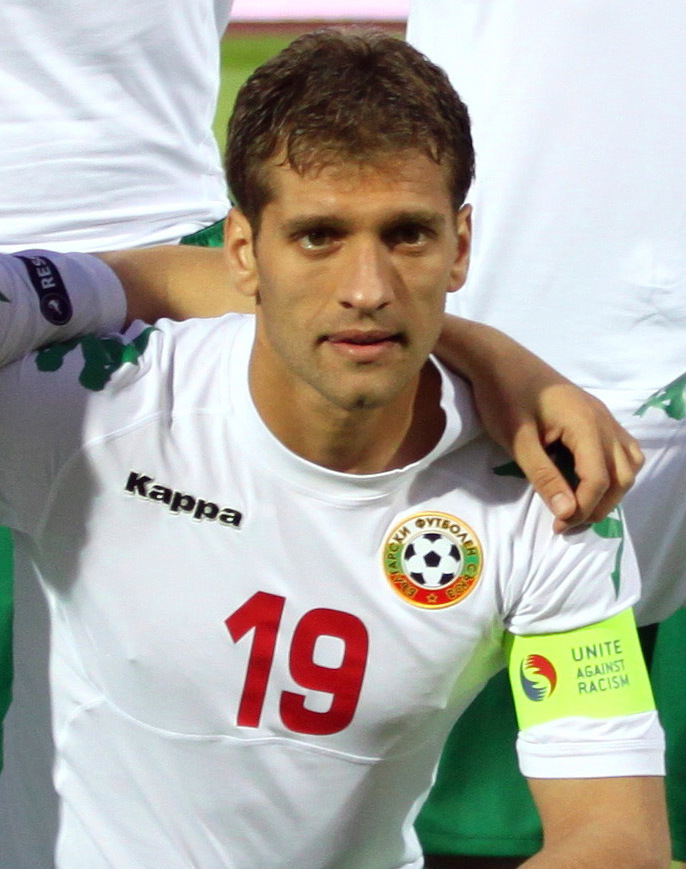
In 2001, Stiliyan Petrov became the first foreign winner of the SPFA Young Player of the Year award.

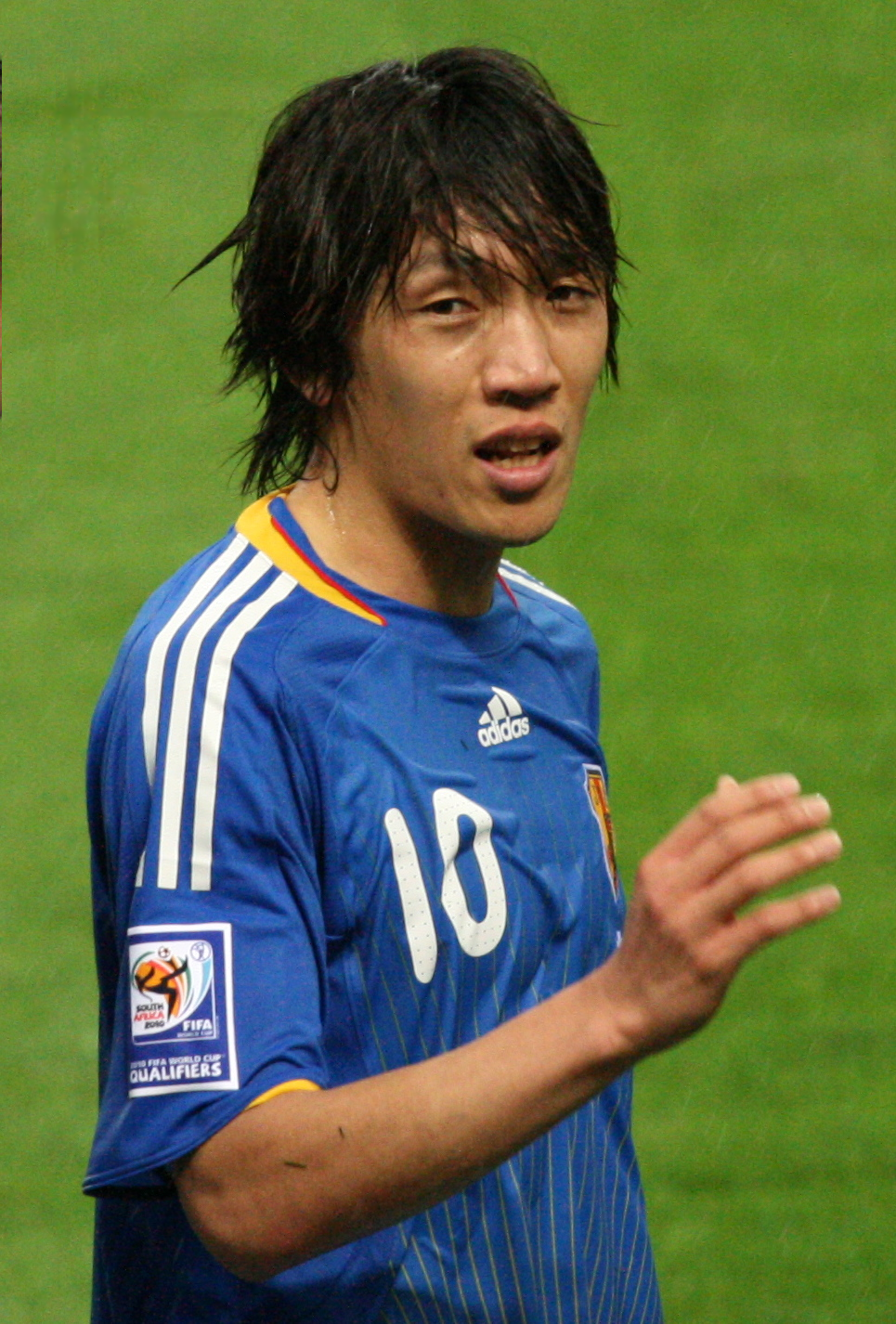
Shunsuke Nakamura scored the goal in 2006 that clinched the team's progression to the knockout stages of the Champions League for the first time.

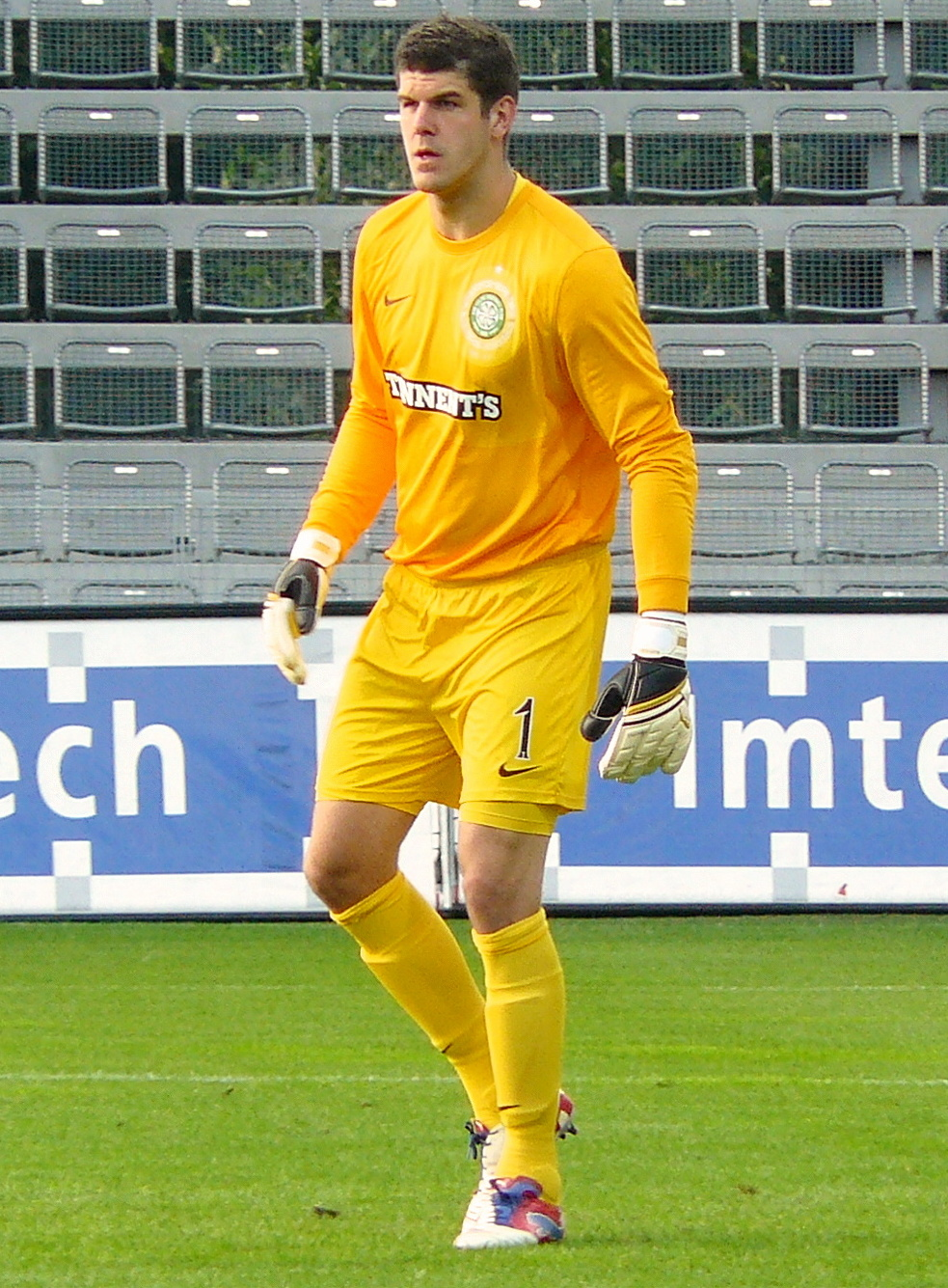
Fraser Forster set a new Scottish record in 2014 when he went 1256 minutes without conceding a goal in league matches.

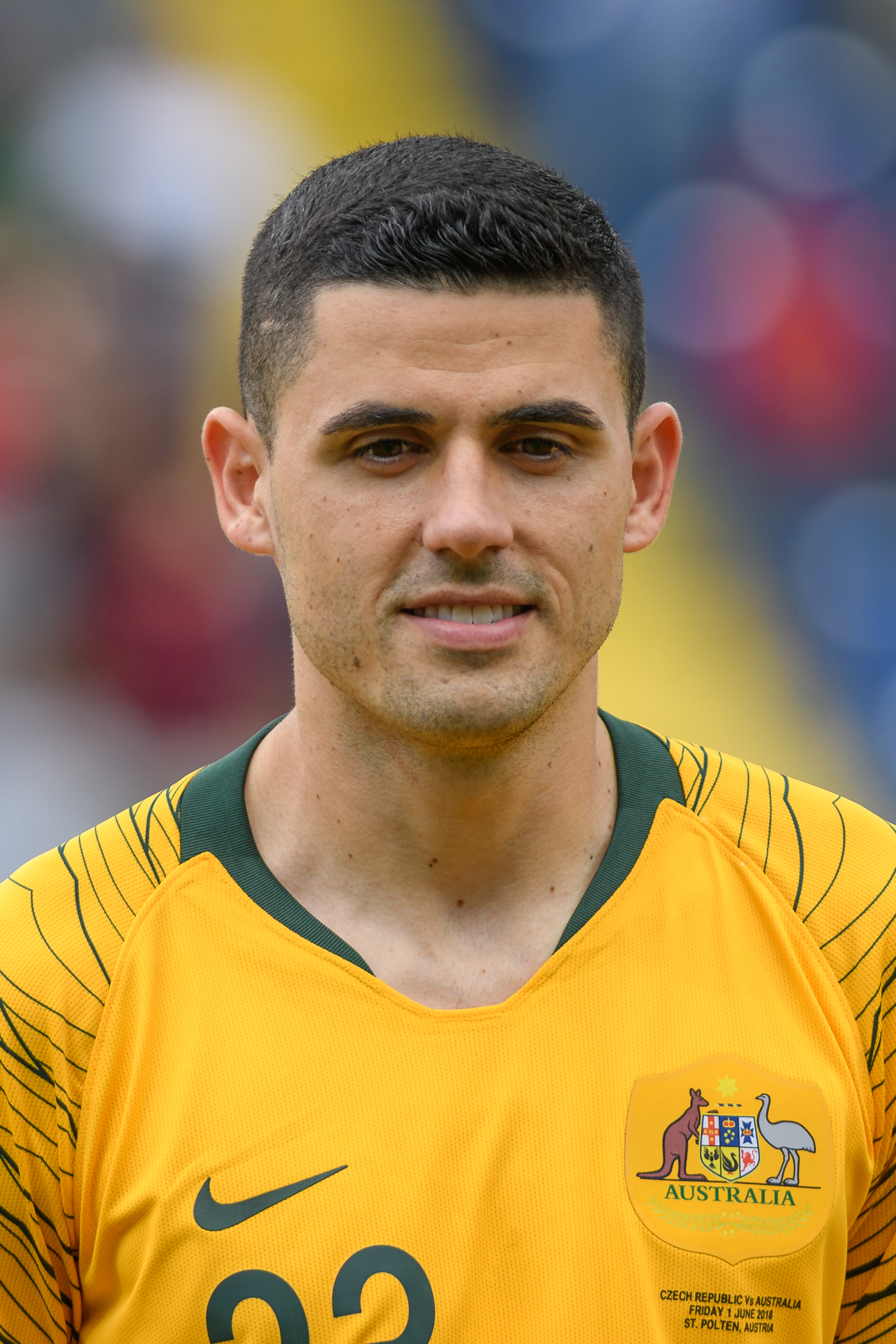
Tom Rogic scored the winner in the 2017 Scottish Cup Final, securing the treble for Celtic, and seeing the club go undefeated in domestic competitions for the season.

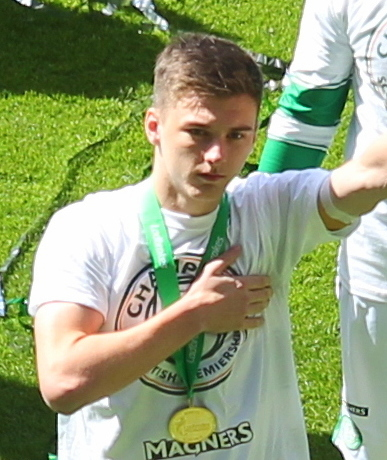
Kieran Tierney, one of the most successful players developed by Celtic's youth academy during the 2010s, and sold to Arsenal in 2019 for £25 million, a record fee for a Scottish player.

Key

GK	Goalkeeper	DF	Defender	MF	Midfielder	FW	Forward	*	Player currently contracted at Celtic

Appearances correct as of match played 23 May 2026

List of Celtic F.C. players with at least 100 appearances or otherwise stated notability
Name	Nationality	Position	Club career	Appearances	Goals	Notes
James Kelly	Scotland	DF	1888–1897	143	4	
Neil McCallum	Scotland	MF	1888–1890; 1891–1892	34	19	(Note: Neil McCallum scored Celtic's first ever goal, opening the scoring in their 5–2 friendly win over Rangers in May 1888.)
Willie Maley	Scotland	DF	1888–1897	100	4	
Johnny Madden	Scotland	FW	1889–1897	121	49	
Jerry Reynolds	Scotland	DF	1889–1895	102	0	
John Campbell	Scotland	FW	1890–1895; 1897–1903	221	123	
Dan Doyle	Scotland	DF	1891–1898	137	6	
Sandy McMahon	Scotland	FW	1891–1903	217	171	
Daniel McArthur	Scotland	GK	1892–1902	124	0	
James Blessington	Scotland	FW	1892–1898	102	38	
Barney Battles, Sr.	Scotland	DF	1895–1897; 1898–1905	135	6	
Peter Somers	Scotland	FW	1897–1910	220	62	
Willie Orr	Scotland	DF	1897–1907	212	25	
Willie Loney	Scotland	DF	1900–1913	303	30	
Jimmy Quinn	Scotland	FW	1900–1917	332	217	
Davie Hamilton	Scotland	FW	1902–1912	260	61	
Jimmy McMenemy	Scotland	FW	1902–1920	516	169	
Davey Adams	Scotland	GK	1902–1912	291	0	
Donald McLeod	Scotland	DF	1902–1908	153	0	
James Young	Scotland	MF	1903–1917	443	15	
Alex Bennett	Scotland	FW	1903–1908	151	53	
Jimmy Hay	Scotland	DF	1903–1911	257	19	
Alec McNair	Scotland	DF	1904–1925	641	8	(Note: Alec McNair made the most appearances for Celtic in the league, playing in 583 games. He is also the oldest player to have ever played for the club, playing against Queens Park in 1925 at the age of 41.)
Peter Johnstone	Scotland	DF	1908–1916	233	19	
Joe Dodds	Scotland	DF	1908–1920; 1921–1922	385	29	
Andrew McAtee	Scotland	FW	1910–1924	439	72	
Patsy Gallacher	Ireland	FW	1911–1925	464	195	
John Browning	Scotland	FW	1911–1919	216	66	
Willie McStay	Scotland	DF	1912–1929	446	39	
Jimmy McColl	Scotland	FW	1912–1924	169	126	
Joe Cassidy	Scotland	FW	1912–1924	203	105	
Charlie Shaw	Scotland	GK	1913–1925	446	0	
John McMaster	Scotland	DF	1913–1923	217	6	
Adam McLean	Scotland	FW	1917–1928	408	138	
William Cringan	Scotland	MF	1917–1923	214	9	
Tommy McInally	Scotland	FW	1919–1922; 1925–1928	213	127	
John Gilchrist	Scotland	MF	1919–1923	134	6	
John McFarlane	Scotland	DF	1920–1929	304	14	
Paddy Connolly	Scotland	FW	1921–1933	299	47	
Jimmy McStay	Scotland	DF	1921–1934	472	8	
Hugh Hilley	Scotland	DF	1921–1930	207	0	
James McGrory	Scotland	FW	1922–1937	445	472	(Note: Jimmy McGrory is the club's top goalscorer with 472 goals in major competitions. He is also the record goalscorer in British football, with a total of 550 goals in competitive first class matches.)
Alec Thomson	Scotland	FW	1922–1934	451	99	
Peter Wilson	Scotland	MF	1923–1934	395	15	
Peter Shevlin	Scotland	GK	1924–1927	103	0	
John Thomson	Scotland	GK	1926–1931	188	0	
Peter McGonagle	Scotland	DF	1926–1936	324	8	
Chic Geatons	Scotland	MF	1927–1941	345	15	
Charlie Napier	Scotland	FW	1928–1935	200	95	
Peter Scarff	Scotland	FW	1928–1933	112	55	
Willie Hughes	Scotland	MF	1929–1936	104	13	
John Morrison	Scotland	MF	1929–1941	182	1	
Bertie Thomson	Scotland	FW	1929–1933	131	31	
Billy Cook	Ireland	DF	1930–1932	109	0	
Joe Kennaway	Canada	GK	1931–1939	263	0	
Malky MacDonald	Scotland	MF	1932–1945	145	37	
Bobby Hogg	Scotland	DF	1932–1948	328	0	(Note: Bobby Hogg is noted for making a total of 575 appearances for Celtic, but a large number of these games were unofficial league and cup fixtures during World War II.)
Johnny Crum	Scotland	FW	1932–1942	210	89	
Jimmy Delaney	Scotland	FW	1933–1946	305	70	
Stephen Grant	Scotland	FW	1933–1937	123	50	
Willie Buchan	Scotland	FW	1933–1937	134	60	
Frank Murphy	Scotland	FW	1933–1945	161	48	
George Paterson	Scotland	DF	1933–1946	195	12	
Willie Lyon	Scotland	DF	1935–1940	163	17	
Willie Miller	Scotland	GK	1940–1950	123	0	
Pat McAuley	Scotland	MF	1940–1950	109	5	
Roy Milne	United States	DF	1940–1952	133	0	
John McPhail	Scotland	FW	1941–1956	204	87	
Jim Mallan	Scotland	DF	1942–1953	117	0	
Bobby Evans	Scotland	MF	1944–1960	535	10	
Joe Baillie	Scotland	DF	1945–1954	151	1	
John Bonnar	Scotland	GK	1948–1958	180	0	
Charlie Tully	Northern Ireland	FW	1948–1959	319	47	
Jock Weir	Scotland	MF	1948–1952	106	38	
Mike Haughney	Scotland	DF	1949–1957	233	46	
Bobby Collins	Scotland	MF	1949–1958	320	120	
Bertie Peacock	Northern Ireland	MF	1949–1961	453	51	
Willie Fernie	Scotland	MF	1949–1958; 1960–1961	317	74	
Jimmy Walsh	Scotland	DF	1949–1956	145	58	
Sean Fallon	Republic of Ireland	DF	1950–1958	254	14	
Jock Stein	Scotland	DF	1951–1956	148	2	
Neil Mochan	Scotland	FW	1953–1960	268	107	
Eric Smith	Scotland	MF	1953–1960	130	20	
Dick Beattie	Scotland	GK	1954–1959	114	0	
Bertie Auld	Scotland	FW; MF	1955–1961; 1965–1971	257	78	
Duncan MacKay	Scotland	DF	1955–1964	232	7	
Jim Kennedy	Scotland	DF	1955–1965	242	2	
Billy McPhail	Scotland	FW	1956–1958	33	13	(Note: Billy McPhail scored a hat-trick in Celtic's 7–1 win over Rangers in the 1957 Scottish League Cup Final.)
Sammy Wilson	Scotland	FW	1957–1959	70	46	(Note: Sammy Wilson scored the opening goal in Celtic's 7–1 Scottish League Cup Final win over Rangers in 1957.)
Paddy Crerand	Scotland	MF	1957–1963	120	5	
Bobby Carroll	Scotland	FW	1957–1963	78	27	(Note: Bobby Carroll is Celtic's first ever goal-scorer in official European competition, scoring twice in a 4–2 defeat away against Valencia in 1962.)
John Divers	Scotland	FW	1957–1966	232	103	
Billy McNeill	Scotland	DF	1957–1975	790	34	
Frank Haffey	Scotland	GK	1958–1964	201	0	
Stevie Chalmers	Scotland	FW	1958–1971	405	231	
John Clark	Scotland	DF	1958–1971	320	3	
Charlie Gallagher	Republic of Ireland	FW	1958–1968	171	32	(Note: In 1967 Charlie Gallagher became the first Scottish-born footballer to be capped by the Republic of Ireland.)
Bobby Murdoch	Scotland	MF	1959–1973	485	102	
John Fallon	Scotland	GK	1959–1971	184	0	
John Hughes	Scotland	FW	1960–1971	416	189	
Bobby Lennox	Scotland	FW	1961–1978; 1979–1980	587	273	
Tommy Gemmell	Scotland	DF	1961–1971	421	66	
Ian Young	Scotland	DF	1961–1968	137	3	
Jimmy Johnstone	Scotland	FW	1962–1975	515	130	(Note: In 2002, Jimmy Johnstone was one of 11 players voted by Celtic supporters as being the "greatest" Celtic team. Johnstone was also voted Celtic's greatest-ever player.)
Jim Brogan	Scotland	DF	1962–1975	213	6	
Ronnie Simpson	Scotland	GK	1964–1970	189	0	
Jim Craig	Scotland	DF	1965–1972	231	6	
Joe McBride	Scotland	FW	1965–1968	94	87	(Note: During season 1966–67, Joe McBride scored 36 goals before Christmas. He was then injured in a game against Aberdeen and did not play again that season. Despite this, he still finished as the top goalscorer in Scotland that season in all competitions (Stevie Chalmers eventually finished the season with more league goals). McBride also has the third best goalscoring average for a player at the club with more than 10 appearances (0.92 goals per game; 89 goals in 97 games, including minor competitions).)
Willie Wallace	Scotland	FW	1966–1971	234	135	
George Connelly	Scotland	DF/MF	1966–1976	254	13	
Harry Hood	Scotland	FW	1968–1976	312	123	
Tommy Callaghan	Scotland	MF	1968–1976	284	33	
Evan Williams	Scotland	GK	1969–1974	148	0	
Davie Hay	Scotland	MF/DF	1968–1974	230	12	
Kenny Dalglish	Scotland	FW	1969–1977	322	167	
Pat McCluskey	Scotland	MF	1969–1977	189	12	
Paul Wilson	Scotland	MF	1970–1978	214	52	
Danny McGrain	Scotland	DF	1970–1987	663	7	
Lou Macari	Scotland	MF	1970–1973	102	56	
Dixie Deans	Scotland	FW	1971–1976	184	132	
Roddie MacDonald	Scotland	DF	1972–1981	254	33	
Andy Lynch	Scotland	DF	1973–1980	187	25	
Steve Murray	Scotland	MF	1973–1976	100	21	
George McCluskey	Scotland	FW	1974–1983	204	78	
Ronnie Glavin	Scotland	MF	1974–1979	101	35	
Jóhannes Eðvaldsson	Iceland	DF	1975–1980	188	36	
Peter Latchford	England	GK	1975–1987	272	0	
Tommy Burns	Scotland	MF	1975–1989	501	83	
Johnny Doyle	Scotland	FW	1976–1981	179	36	
Roy Aitken	Scotland	DF/MF	1976–1990	672	48	(Note: Roy Aitken made 672 appearances for Celtic in major competitions during his 14 years at Celtic Park. He also captained the club to a league and cup double in their centenary year of 1988.)
Alfie Conn, Jr.	Scotland	MF	1976–1979	37	8	(Note: Alfie Conn became the first post-war footballer to play for both Rangers and Celtic. He was also the first player to ever win Scottish Cup medals with both Old Firm clubs.)
Tom McAdam	Scotland	DF	1977–1986	354	48	
Mark Reid	Scotland	DF	1977–1985	177	12	
Packie Bonner	Republic of Ireland	GK	1978–1997	642	0	(Note: Pat Bonner has made the most appearances of any goalkeeper for Celtic. He is also the player to have won the most caps playing for his country (80, Republic of Ireland) whilst at Celtic.)
Murdo MacLeod	Scotland	MF	1978–1987	395	82	
David Provan	Scotland	FW	1978–1987	303	43	
Dom Sullivan	Scotland	MF	1979–1983	113	15	
Charlie Nicholas	Scotland	FW	1979–1983; 1990–1995	250	125	
Frank McGarvey	Scotland	FW	1980–1985	245	113	
Paul McStay	Scotland	MF	1981–1997	678	72	
Peter Grant	Scotland	MF	1982–1997	470	20	
Brian McClair	Scotland	FW	1983–1987	198	122	
Mo Johnston	Scotland	FW	1984–1987	127	71	
Derek Whyte	Scotland	DF	1985–1992	276	8	
Mark McGhee	Scotland	FW	1985–1989	113	34	
Anton Rogan	Northern Ireland	DF	1986–1991	166	5	
Gerry Creaney	Scotland	FW	1987–1994	144	53	
Andy Walker	Scotland	FW	1987–1992; 1994–1996	189	67	
Chris Morris	Republic of Ireland	DF	1987–1992	160	8	
Frank McAvennie	Scotland	FW	1987–1989; 1992–1994	106	50	
Joe Miller	Scotland	FW	1987–1993	152	28	
Mark McNally	Scotland	DF	1987–1995	152	4	
Tommy Coyne	Republic of Ireland	FW	1989–1993	105	43	
Paul Elliott	England	DF	1989–1991	66	5	(Note: Paul Elliott was voted Scottish PFA Player of the Year in 1991.)
Dariusz Dziekanowski	Poland	FW	1989–1992	49	10	(Note: Dariusz Dziekanowski is Celtic's record goalscorer in a single European match, scoring four goals in a 5–4 win over Partizan Belgrade in 1989.)
Mike Galloway	Scotland	MF/DF	1989–1996	175	10	
Dariusz Wdowczyk	Poland	DF	1989–1994	147	6	
John Collins	Scotland	MF	1990–1996	229	48	
Brian O'Neil	Scotland	DF/MF	1991–1997	121	8	
Gordon Marshall	Scotland	GK	1991–1998	112	0	
Tom Boyd	Scotland	DF	1992–2003	364	2	
Simon Donnelly	Scotland	FW	1993–1999	181	42	
Phil O'Donnell	Scotland	MF	1994–1999	114	20	
Tosh McKinlay	Scotland	DF	1994–1999	124	0	
Pierre van Hooijdonk	Netherlands	FW	1995–1997	84	52	(Note: Pierre van Hooijdonk scored Celtic's goal in their 1–0 1995 Scottish Cup Final win over Airdrie, the club's first trophy in six years. He was also the top goalscorer in Scotland the following season, 1995–96.)
Andreas Thom	Germany	FW	1995–1998	101	27	(Note: Andreas Thom's £2.2 million transfer fee in July 1995 made him Celtic's record signing at the time.)
Morten Wieghorst	Denmark	MF	1995–2002	105	14	
Jackie McNamara	Scotland	DF	1995–2005	358	15	
Jorge Cadete	Portugal	FW	1996–1997	48	38	(Note: Jorge Cadete was the top goal-scorer in Scotland for season 1996–97.)
Alan Stubbs	England	DF	1996–2001	127	4	
Paolo Di Canio	Italy	FW	1996–1997	37	15	(Note: Paolo Di Canio was voted PFA Scotland Player of the Year in 1997.)
Craig Burley	Scotland	MF	1997–1999	93	26	(Note: Craig Burley was voted Scottish Football Writers Player of the Year in 1998.)
Henrik Larsson	Sweden	FW	1997–2004	315	242	
Stéphane Mahé	France	DF	1997–2001	109	5	
Jonathan Gould	Scotland	GK	1997–2003	158	0	
Paul Lambert	Scotland	MF	1997–2006	275	19	
Mark Burchill	Scotland	FW	1998–2001	50	20	(Note: Mark Burchill scored the fastest ever hat-trick in European competition on 24 August 2000 in a 7–0 win over Jeunesse d'Esch in a UEFA Cup qualifying round tie.)
Johan Mjällby	Sweden	DF	1998–2004	198	15	
Ľubomír Moravčík	Slovakia	MF	1998–2002	129	35	
Mark Viduka	Australia	FW	1998–2000	46	35	(Note: Mark Viduka was voted PFA Scotland Player of the Year in 2000.)
Stiliyan Petrov	Bulgaria	MF	1999–2006	311	64	(Note: In 2001, Stiliyan Petrov became the first foreign winner of the SPFA Young Player of the Year award.)
Shaun Maloney	Scotland	FW	1999–2007; 2008–2011	216	52	
Chris Sutton	England	FW	2000–2006	199	86	(Note: In the summer of 2000 Chris Sutton became Celtic's record signing, with a transfer fee of £6 million paid to Chelsea.)
Joos Valgaeren	Belgium	DF	2000–2005	178	10	
Alan Thompson	England	MF	2000–2007	227	51	(Note: In 2004 Alan Thompson became the first footballer to be capped by England whilst contracted at Celtic.)
Didier Agathe	France	MF/DF	2000–2006	183	11	
Robert Douglas	Scotland	GK	2000–2005	172	0	
Neil Lennon	Northern Ireland	MF	2000–2007	304	3	
Dianbobo Baldé	Guinea	DF	2001–2009	234	16	
John Hartson	Wales	FW	2001–2006	201	110	
Stephen McManus	Scotland	DF	2003–2010	203	20	
Stanislav Varga	Slovakia	DF	2003–2006	116	14	
Aiden McGeady	Republic of Ireland	MF	2004–2010	252	37	
Artur Boruc	Poland	GK	2005–2010	221	0	
Shunsuke Nakamura	Japan	MF	2005–2009	165	33	
Mark Wilson	Scotland	DF	2006–2012	131	3	
Gary Caldwell	Scotland	DF	2006–2010	151	6	
Jan Vennegoor of Hesselink	Netherlands	FW	2006–2009	108	44	
Lee Naylor	England	DF	2006–2010	142	3	
Scott Brown	Scotland	MF	2007–2021	620	46	
Scott McDonald	Australia	FW	2007–2010	127	64	
Andreas Hinkel	Germany	DF	2008–2011	103	1	
Georgios Samaras	Greece	FW	2008–2014	248	74	
James Forrest^{*}	Scotland	FW	2010–	569	111	
Charlie Mulgrew	Scotland	DF/MF	2010–2016	208	29	
Fraser Forster	England	GK	2010–2014; 2019–2020	236	0	
Joe Ledley	Wales	MF	2010–2014	157	30	
Beram Kayal	Israel	MF	2010–2015	132	3	
Gary Hooper	England	FW	2010–2014	138	82	
Anthony Stokes	Republic of Ireland	FW	2010–2016	192	77	
Emilio Izaguirre	Honduras	DF	2010–2017; 2018–2019	271	5	
Kris Commons	Scotland	MF	2011–2017	227	91	
Adam Matthews	Wales	DF	2011–2015	148	5	
Victor Wanyama	Kenya	MF	2011–2013	91	13	(Note: Victor Wanyama was voted the SPL Young Player of the Year in season 2012–13. He was then sold to Southampton in July 2013 for £12.5 million, at the time a record transfer fee received by a Scottish Club.)
Mikael Lustig	Sweden	DF	2011–2019	276	21	
Efe Ambrose	Nigeria	DF	2012–2017	169	6	
Tom Rogic	Australia	MF	2013–2022	272	46	(Note: Tom Rogic scored the winning goal in Celtic's 2–1 win over Aberdeen in the 2017 Scottish Cup Final, securing the club's fourth domestic treble.)
Virgil van Dijk	Netherlands	DF	2013–2015	114	15	
Nir Bitton	Israel	MF	2013–2022	271	15	
Callum McGregor^{*}	Scotland	MF	2013–	575	77	
Stefan Johansen	Norway	MF	2014–2016	114	19	(Note: Stefan Johansen was voted PFA Scotland Player of the Year in 2015.)
Leigh Griffiths	Scotland	FW	2014–2022	261	123	
Craig Gordon	Scotland	GK	2014–2020	242	0	
Kieran Tierney^{*}	Scotland	DF	2014–2019; 2025–	223	14	
Stuart Armstrong	Scotland	MF	2015–2018	145	28	
Anthony Ralston^{*}	Scotland	DF	2015–present	161	8	
Dedryck Boyata	Belgium	DF	2015–2019	135	14	
Jozo Šimunović	Croatia	DF	2015–2020	126	5	
Ryan Christie	Scotland	MF	2015–2021	142	41	
Kristoffer Ajer	Norway	DF	2016–2021	177	7	
Moussa Dembélé	France	FW	2016–2018	94	51	(Note: Moussa Dembélé was a Scottish record transfer sale at the time, having been sold to Lyon in August 2018 for €22 million (about £19.7 million).)
Scott Sinclair	England	FW	2016–2020	167	62	(Note: Scott Sinclair was voted PFA Scotland Player of the Year in 2017.)
Olivier Ntcham	Cameroon	MF	2017–2021	146	24	
Odsonne Édouard	France	FW	2017–2021	168	85	
Greg Taylor	Scotland	DF	2019–2025	216	9	
David Turnbull	Scotland	MF	2020–2024	106	23	
Liel Abada	Israel	MF	2021–2024	113	29	
Kyogo Furuhashi	Japan	FW	2021–2025	165	85	
Carl Starfelt	Sweden	DF	2021–2023	87	3	
Joe Hart	England	GK	2021–2024	156	0	
Liam Scales^{*}	Republic of Ireland	DF	2021-present	153	8	
Jota ^{*}	Portugal	FW	2021–2023, 2025–present	99	33	
Cameron Carter-Vickers^{*}	United States	DF	2021–present	172	8	
Daizen Maeda	Japan	FW	2022–2026	212	79	
Reo Hatate	Japan	MF	2022–2026	189	33	
Matt O'Riley	Denmark	MF	2022–2024	120	27	
Alistair Johnston^{*}	Canada	DF	2023–present	122	7	
Yang Hyun-jun^{*}	South Korea	FW	2023–present	112	17	
Arne Engels	Belgium	MF	2024–2026	100	17	(Note: Arne Engels is Celtics's record incoming transfer.)

== Club captains ==
List of Celtic F.C. captains
Name	Nationality	From – To	Scottish League	Scottish Cup	Scottish League Cup	European Cup	Total honours
James Kelly	Scotland	1888–1897	3	1	-	-	4
Dan Doyle	Scotland	1897–1899	1	1	-	-	2
Sandy McMahon	Scotland	1899–1903	0	1	-	-	1
Willie Orr	Scotland	1903–1906	2	1	-	-	3
Jimmy Hay	Scotland	1906–1911	4	3	-	-	7
Jim Young	Scotland	1911–1917	4	2	-	-	6
Alec McNair	Scotland	1917–1920	1	0	-	-	1
Willie Cringan	Scotland	1920–1923	1	1	-	-	2
Charlie Shaw	Scotland	1923–1925	0	1	-	-	1
Willie McStay	Scotland	1925–1929	1	1	-	-	2
Jimmy McStay	Scotland	1929–1934	0	2	-	-	2
Bobby Hogg	Scotland	1934–1935	0	0	-	-	0
Willie Lyon	Scotland	1935–1939	2	1	-	-	3
John McPhail	Scotland	1948–1952	0	1	0	-	1
Sean Fallon	Republic of Ireland	1952–1953	0	0	0	-	0
Jock Stein	Scotland	1953–1955	1	1	0	-	2
Bobby Evans	Scotland	1955–1957	0	0	1	0	1
Bertie Peacock	Northern Ireland	1957–1961	0	0	1	0	1
Duncan Mackay	Scotland	1961–1963	0	0	0	0	0
Billy McNeill	Scotland	1963–1975	9	7	6	1	23
Kenny Dalglish	Scotland	1975–1977	1	1	0	0	2
Danny McGrain	Scotland	1977–1987	4	2	1	0	7
Roy Aitken	Scotland	1987–1990	1	2	0	0	3
Paul McStay	Scotland	1990–1997	0	1	0	0	1
Tom Boyd	Scotland	1997–2002	3	1	3	0	7
Paul Lambert	Scotland	2002–2004	1	1	0	0	2
Jackie McNamara	Scotland	2004–2005	0	1	0	0	1
Neil Lennon	Northern Ireland	2005–2007	2	1	1	0	4
Stephen McManus	Scotland	2007–2010	1	0	1	0	2
Scott Brown	Scotland	2010–2021	9	5	5	0	19
Callum McGregor	Scotland	2021–	5	3	3	0	11

== Notes ==
Citations/ sources for each note are included in the "Notable players" section above:
