= McStay =

McStay is a surname. Notable people with the surname include:

- Chris McStay (born 1996), Scottish footballer
- Daniel McStay (born 1995), Australian rules footballer
- Francis McStay (1892–1934), Scottish footballer with Motherwell
- Gerard McStay (1928–2001), Gaelic footballer
- Henry McStay (born 1985), football player from Lurgan in Northern Ireland
- Janetta McStay CBE (1917–2012), New Zealand concert pianist and music professor
- Jimmy McStay (1893–1974), former Scottish footballer and manager
- Jimmy McStay (footballer, born 1922) (1922–2007), professional footballer
- John McStay ("Jock") (born 1965), Scottish former professional footballer
- Kevin McStay (born 1962), Irish Gaelic football manager, commentator, analyst and former player
- Michael McStay (1933–2025), English actor and writer
- Paul McStay MBE (born 1964), former football player who spent his entire career with Scottish team Celtic Football Club
- Ray McStay (born 1970), Scottish former footballer
- Ryan McStay (born 1985), in Bellshill, is a professional footballer
- Willie McStay (footballer, born 1892) (1892–1960), Scottish international footballer
- Willie McStay (footballer, born 1961), former professional footballer
- McStay family murder, a case about an American family who went missing in 2010 and whose bodies were discovered in 2013
