= List of Celtic F.C. managers =

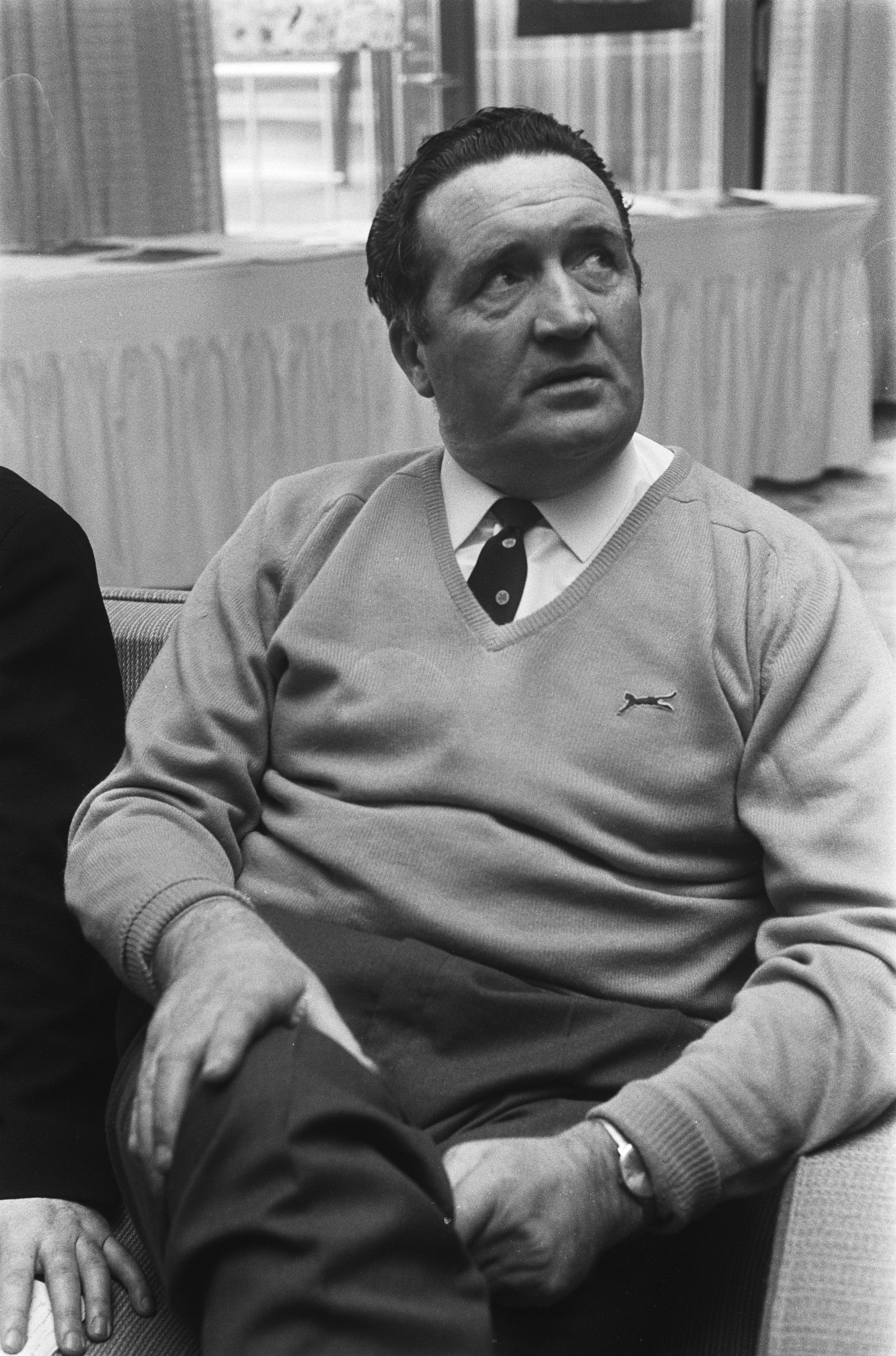
Jock Stein is considered to be Celtic's greatest manager.

Celtic Football Club is a Scottish association football club based in Glasgow. The club was founded in 1887 and played their first match in May 1888. Celtic have won the Scottish League Championship on 56 occasions, the Scottish Cup 42 times and the Scottish League Cup 22 times.

As of the 2025–26 season, Celtic have had 20 different full-time managers. Willie Maley, the club's first manager, is the longest to have served in the post, having managed the club from 1897 to 1940. The 30 major honours Maley won during his tenure are the most a manager has achieved at Celtic.

Under Jock Stein, Celtic enjoyed their greatest period of sustained success. Stein assumed management in 1965 and over the next decade transformed the club into a dominant force domestically and a major contender in Europe. Between 1966–67 and 1974–75, Celtic won nine consecutive Scottish league championships. Under his leadership the club also won multiple Scottish Cups and League Cups. Most notably, in 1967 Stein guided Celtic — later dubbed the “Lisbon Lions” — to victory in the European Cup, making them the first British club ever to win Europe’s premier club competition. That triumph remains Celtic’s only European Cup win to date and stands as the pinnacle of the club’s mid-20th century achievements.

Martin O'Neill is widely regarded as the most influential Celtic manager since Jock Stein. Appointed in June 2000, he revived a club that had endured a period of domestic under-achievement and quickly restored Celtic to domestic dominance. In his first season he guided the team to a domestic treble, the club’s first since the Stein era in the late 1960s. That season also featured a 6–2 victory over Rangers — at the time the largest margin of victory over their great rivals in more than four decades. Celtic then retained the league title in 2001–02, the first time the club had done so since 1982. Most significantly, O’Neill also took Celtic to the 2003 UEFA Cup Final — their first European final since 1970 — re-establishing the club’s competitiveness on the continental stage. His win rate of 75.5% is the highest of any manager in the club's history. O'Neill returned to Celtic in 2025 at the age of 73 during a crisis hit season. He managed Celtic to a Scottish Premier League and Scottish Cup double, further cementing his legendary status at the football club.

This chronological list comprises all those who have held the position of manager of the first team of Celtic since its foundation in 1887. Each manager's entry includes the dates of tenure and the club's overall competitive record in terms of matches won, drawn and lost, and of major honours won. Caretaker managers are also included.

== Managerial history ==
=== 1888–1965 ===
For the first few years following its formation, the administrative and team selection duties at Celtic were performed by a committee. Willie Maley had played for the team since their inaugural match in May 1888, and on his retirement at the age of 29 was appointed secretary-manager in April 1897, effectively becoming the team's first ever manager. His role was quite different to the modern style of manager or head coach; he never worked with his players in training and only watched games from the director's box. He did not perform team talks or speak with the players at half time or immediately post-match. Having been a club that initially relied on buying in experienced players, Maley instead concentrated on developing young talent. This proved a success as Celtic won six consecutive league titles in the first decade of the 20th century. In 1907 the team also became the first Scottish side win a league and cup double. The next decade saw Maley lead Celtic to a further four successive league titles between 1914 and 1917, during which time they went on an unbeaten run for 62 games from 13 November 1915 until 21 April 1917. This remained a British record for an unbeaten run in professional football until it was surpassed by Brendan Rodgers' Celtic over 100 years later. Towards the end of his reign, Maley led Celtic to further League titles in 1936 and 1938 and the Scottish Cup in 1937. He remained in his post for almost 43 years, the longest serving manager in the club's history, and guided the team to 30 major trophies.

Jimmy McStay, who made over 400 appearances for Celtic as a player and captained the side, was appointed manager in 1940. His tenure was during World War II, a period when Scottish football suffered huge disruption. He also had to contend with increased boardroom interference, which he never managed to quell. The result was stagnation with little tangible success. In the summer of 1945, McStay reluctantly resigned at the behest of the board and was succeeded by another celebrated former player, Jimmy McGrory. The early years of his tenure were very poor, and in 1948 the club only narrowly avoided relegation. Results improved in the early 1950s with the Coronation Cup win in 1953 and a league and cup double in 1954. McGrory also led Celtic to a famous 7–1 Scottish League Cup Final win over Rangers in 1957, still a record score in a major British cup final. His time as manager is considered largely a period of underachievement, and with chairman Robert Kelly's domineering influence in the running of the club, many questioned how much say McGrory had in team selection.

=== 1965–1991 ===
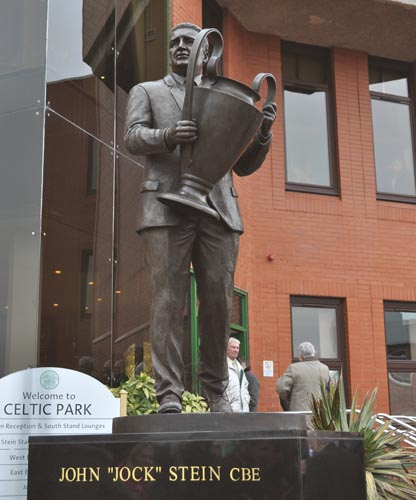
Jock Stein was the first British football manager to win the European Cup, leading Celtic to victory over Inter Milan in 1967.

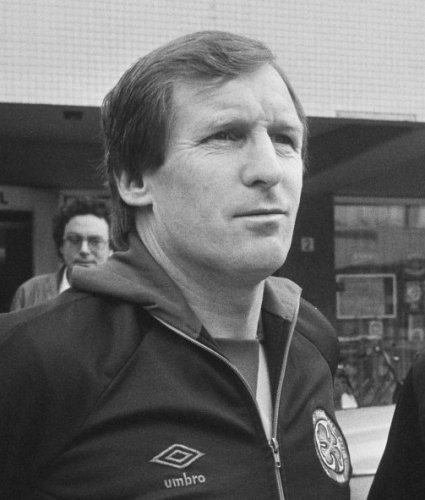
Billy McNeill had two spells as manager of Celtic, having also captained the side to their European Cup win in 1967 as a player.

Jock Stein left Hibernian to become manager of Celtic in 1965, with McGrory taking on the role of the club's Public Relations Officer. As a player, Stein had previously captained Celtic to their league and cup double success in 1954, and then as manager led Dunfermline to a famous cup final win over Celtic in 1961. On succeeding from McGrory, Stein took full control of all team matters. He is considered a football visionary; transforming a side lacking direction and having gone almost eight years without a trophy into the best team in Europe, all whilst playing entertaining adventurous football. In contrast to his predecessors, he was actively involved in his players training – a "tracksuit manager". And whereas training had previously consisted of mainly running around the track, he introduced practising with the ball into training. A Scottish Cup Final win was achieved within weeks of taking up the reins as manager, followed in 1966 by the first of nine consecutive league championship wins. In his second full season as manager, Stein led Celtic to success in all five competitions they took part in (a "quintuple"), most memorably their 2–1 win in Lisbon over Inter Milan in the 1967 European Cup Final. He led Celtic to a further European Cup final in 1970, knocking out Benfica and Leeds United en route, but lost to Feyenoord 2–1 after extra time in the final. He was seriously injured in a car accident in July 1975 and spent the next year recuperating, with assistant manager Sean Fallon taking over managerial duties for the season. On his return in season 1976–77, Stein led Celtic to a league and cup double; these would be the last honours he would win at Celtic. After winning 25 major trophies, Stein finally relinquished his role in 1978.

In 1978 former player and captain of the European Cup winning team, Billy McNeill took over as manager, having spent the previous season managing Aberdeen. He brought the league title back to Parkhead in his first season, clinching the championship in their final match of the season with a 4–2 win over Rangers. A Cup Final win in 1980 was followed by back-to-back titles in 1981 and 1982. A public row however with the board over a contract and funds for new players resulted in McNeill leaving the club in 1983. At only 35 years old, David Hay succeeded McNeill. A frustrating first season saw Celtic finish runners-up in each of the domestic competitions. Success did eventually arrive though, winning the centenary Scottish Cup in 1985 and then a famous last day championship win at Love Street in 1986, defeating St Mirren 5–0 whilst title rivals Hearts lost at Dundee, securing the league on goal difference. Hay was unable to cope with high spending Rangers the following year, and on failing to win any trophies was sacked by the club. Billy McNeill dramatically returned to the club in the summer of 1987 and went on to lead the club to a league and cup double in its centenary season of 1987–88. A further Cup Final win followed in 1989, but the club went into a dramatic decline after that. After two seasons without any honours, McNeill was sacked in 1991.

=== 1991–2000 ===
Former Republic of Ireland international, Liam Brady, became the first Celtic manager who had never previously played for the club. He failed to win any trophies in his first two seasons or reach any cup finals, and with no progress apparent into this third season he resigned in October 1993. Frank Connor took interim charge for several matches, before Lou Macari was appointed manager. Despite defeating Rangers 2–1 at Ibrox in his first match, results otherwise failed to improve. Fergus McCann took over as owner of Celtic in March 1994 and duly sacked Macari three months later. Following Macari's sacking, Tommy Burns was appointed manager in the summer of 1994. Celtic won their first trophy in six years at the end of the season, beating Airdrie 1–0 in the Scottish Cup final. However, this was an era of domestic dominance by Rangers and despite an outstanding second season in 1995–96 where only one league match was lost, Burns could still finish only second in the league behind the Ibrox club. Despite expensive players arriving at Parkhead, Celtic remained unable to overhaul Rangers the following season in 1997. After losing to Falkirk in the semi-final of the Scottish Cup, Burns was sacked and his assistant Billy Stark took charge for the few remaining games of the season.

In the summer of 1997, former European Cup winner and Dutch international, Wim Jansen, became head coach. Despite losing his first two games of the season, Jansen quickly turned things round and won the club's first Scottish League Cup in 15 years when they beat Dundee United 3–0 in the final. A tightly fought league campaign saw Celtic clinch the title on the final day of the season, stopping Rangers' bid for 10 league titles in a row. However it had by then become known that Jansen was disgruntled with Celtic managing director, Jock Brown, and he quit in the immediate aftermath of Celtic's title win. Veteran Slovak coach Jozef Vengloš arrived at Celtic for the following season. A poor start to the season put Vengloš under pressure, but the arrival of new signings and a 5–1 win over Rangers in the league gave rise to optimism. However the league deficit was too much to claw back and a Scottish Cup final defeat to Rangers sealed a largely disappointing season. The summer of 1999 saw the arrival of Kenny Dalglish as director of football and John Barnes as head coach. A bright start soon faded as Celtic began to drop vital points in the league. A shock Cup defeat at home to Inverness Caledonian Thistle saw Barnes sacked and Dalglish taking over as caretaker manager for the rest of the season. Celtic did win the League Cup, but slumped in the league and finished 21 points behind winners Rangers.

=== 2000–2019 ===
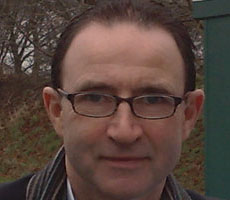
Martin O'Neill won the domestic treble in his first season as manager and led Celtic to the UEFA Cup Final in 2003, their first European final in over 30 years.

Martin O'Neill, a former European Cup winner as a player with Nottingham Forest, took charge of the club in June 2000. O'Neill's first Old Firm game, in late August 2000, ended in a 6–2 victory for Celtic. It was their biggest victory over Rangers since the 1957 Scottish League Cup Final. His second Old Firm game saw a reversal of fortunes, however, as Celtic suffered a 5–1 defeat. In that first season, O'Neill won a domestic treble with Celtic, the first time this had been achieved since 1968–69. He was then touted as a potential successor to Alex Ferguson, who had announced he was to leave Manchester United in 2002. Celtic then retained the league title in 2001–02, the first time since 1982 that Celtic had managed that feat. Celtic also qualified for the Champions League group stage, winning all of their home games but losing all of their away games.

He then guided Celtic to the 2003 UEFA Cup Final in Seville, which Celtic lost 3–2 in extra time to a Porto side managed by José Mourinho. This was Celtic's first European final since 1970 and they beat Blackburn, Celta Vigo, Stuttgart, Liverpool and Boavista on the way to the final. He was named on the five-man shortlist for UEFA Team of the Year in the manager category in 2003 The following season Celtic regained the league title from rivals Rangers and reached the quarter-finals of the UEFA Cup, with their run seeing them knock out Barcelona.

On 25 May 2005, Celtic announced that O'Neill would resign as manager to care for his wife, Geraldine, who had lymphoma. His last competitive game in charge of Celtic was the Scottish Cup final 1–0 victory over Dundee United on 28 May 2005, decided by an eleventh-minute goal by Alan Thompson.

Under O'Neill, Celtic won 213, drew 29 and lost 40 of 282 games played, making him the most successful Celtic manager since Jock Stein. In his five seasons at Celtic Park, O'Neill won three Scottish Premier League titles, three Scottish Cups, and a League Cup. The two league titles he lost were by margins of a goal and a point, respectively. He also oversaw a record seven consecutive victories in Old Firm derbies, and in the 2003–04 season Celtic created a British record of 25 consecutive league victories. His win rate of 75.5% is the highest of any manager in the club's history.

Gordon Strachan was announced as O'Neill's replacement in June 2005 and after winning the SPL title in his first year in charge, he went on to become only the third Celtic manager to win three titles in a row. He also guided Celtic to their first UEFA Champions League knockout stage in 2006–07 and repeated the feat in 2007–08 before departing the club in May 2009, after failing to win the SPL title. Tony Mowbray took charge of the club in June 2009, and he was succeeded a year later by Neil Lennon. Celtic narrowly lost out to Rangers in the league in Lennon's first season in charge, but he did gain consolation by defeating Motherwell 3–0 in the 2011 Scottish Cup Final. Lennon went on to win three league titles in a row, then announced his departure from the club in May 2014 after four years in the role.

Norwegian Ronny Deila was appointed manager of Celtic in June 2014. He went on to lead Celtic to two consecutive league titles and a League Cup, but the team's performances in European competition were poor. Following being knocked out of the Scottish Cup by Rangers in April 2016, Deila announced he would leave the club at the end of the season.

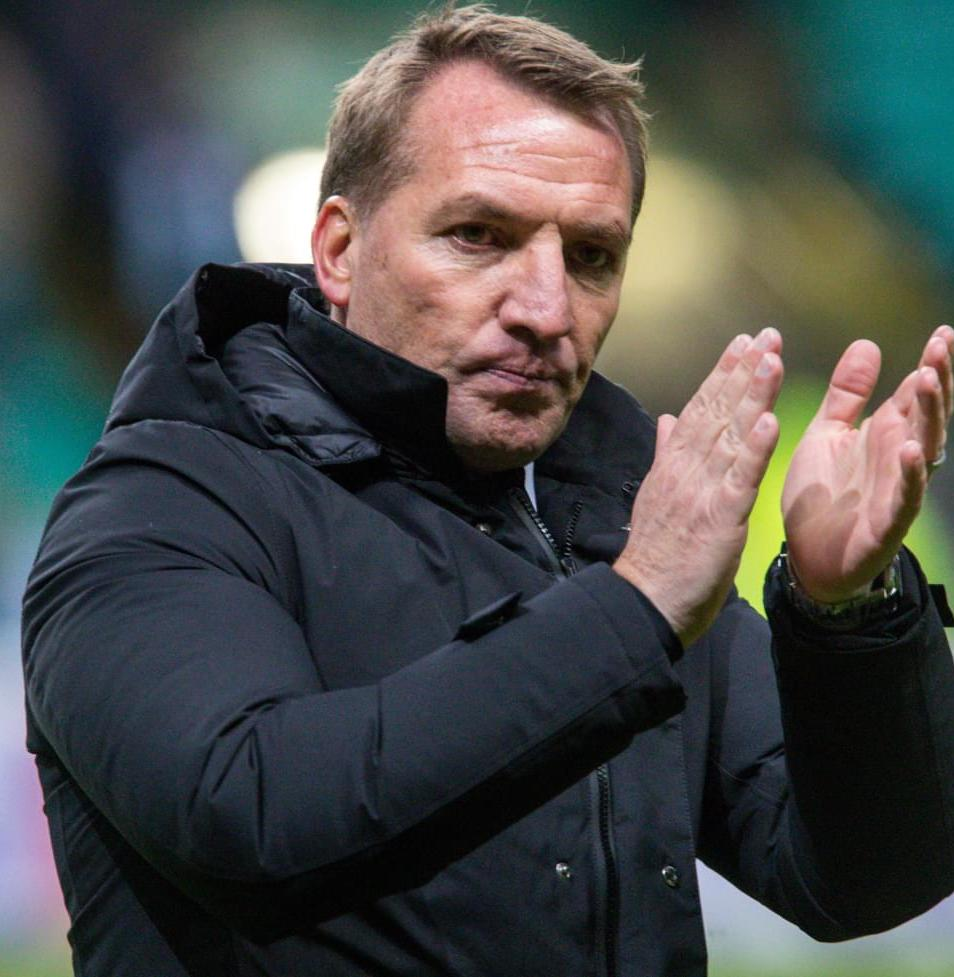
Brendan Rodgers managed Celtic to two consecutive domestic trebles.

In May 2016, Brendan Rodgers was announced as Deila's successor. In his first season the club won their 100th major trophy, defeating Aberdeen in the League Cup Final in November 2016, and clinched the league title in April 2017 with a record eight league games to spare. Celtic finished their league campaign undefeated, the first time a Scottish top-flight side had done so since 1899. In May 2017, Celtic defeated Aberdeen 2–1 in the Scottish Cup final, clinching the club's fourth domestic treble, as well as securing an unprecedented domestic season unbeaten. Celtic continued their unbeaten domestic run into the following season, eventually extending it to 69 games, surpassing their own 100-year-old British record of 62 games set by Willie Maley, before finally losing to Hearts. In November 2017, Celtic defeated Motherwell in the 2017 Scottish League Cup Final, before a seventh consecutive league title was clinched in April 2018, with Celtic then going on to defeat Motherwell in the 2018 Scottish Cup Final to clinch a second consecutive domestic treble (the "double treble"), the first club in Scotland to do so. Into his third season, Rodgers led Celtic to another League Cup, defeating Aberdeen in the final, and by February 2019 the club were eight points clear in the league. However, on 26 February 2019 Rodgers left Celtic in a surprise move to take over as manager of Leicester City. Neil Lennon returned to Celtic to work as caretaker manager until the end of the season. He went on to help Celtic complete their eighth successive league title, and then to a 2–1 win over Hearts in the 2019 Scottish Cup Final to clinch the treble for the third season in a row (the "treble treble"). The following week, Lennon was confirmed as full-time manager for the second time.

=== 2019–present ===
Into the first full season of his second spell as manager, Neil Lennon led Celtic to a 1–0 win over Rangers in the 2019 Scottish League Cup Final, the club's tenth consecutive domestic trophy. By March 2020, Celtic were 13 points clear in the league and well on the way to a ninth consecutive title: However, all professional football in Scotland was suspended later that month due to the COVID-19 pandemic in the United Kingdom, resulting in demands from the news media in Scotland for the league season to be declared "null and void". However, after several weeks of controversy, Celtic were confirmed as champions on 18 May 2020 following a league board meeting the previous week where it was agreed that completing the full league campaign was unfeasible. The completion of the 2019-20 Scottish Cup was delayed due to the ongoing COVID-19 pandemic, with the semi-finals and final not taking place until late autumn/ winter of 2020. Celtic and Hearts reached the final that took place on 20 December 2020. The match went to penalty-kicks after the sides tied at 3–3 after extra time, with Celtic going on to win the penalty shoot-out to clinch a fourth successive treble. This win saw Lennon become the first to win a treble as both player and manager. Celtic struggled throughout season 2020–21 though; poor performances in Europe, knocked out of the League Cup by Ross County (bringing to an end a run of 35 domestic cup wins), and by February 2021 were trailing 18 points behind Rangers in the league - effectively ending Celtic's hopes of "ten in a row" league titles. Lennon resigned on 24 February 2021, with assistant manager John Kennedy taking interim charge of the team.

On 10 June 2021, Ange Postecoglou was announced as the new manager of Celtic. His first couple of months as manager was a period of upheaval, with 12 first-team players leaving during the summer transfer window while 10 new players were signed. Celtic lost three of their opening six league matches, but enjoyed high-scoring wins over Dundee and St Mirren. Improved form in October saw Postecoglou win the Manager of the Month award, with new signings Jota and Kyogo Furuhashi flourishing in the side. In December, Celtic won the first domestic trophy of the season, defeating Hibernian 2–1 in the League Cup Final. Celtic then went on a run of 31 domestic league games undefeated to regain the league championship at the first attempt. The title was secured following a 1–1 draw with Dundee United at Tannadice on 11 May 2022. Celtic made a strong start to the following season, and by New Year (2023) were nine points clear of second-placed Rangers in the league, with a significantly higher goal difference. The League Cup was retained with a 2–1 win over Rangers in the final on 26 February 2023, Kyogo scoring twice for Celtic. Back-to-back league titles were clinched on 7 May 2023 with four games to spare after a 2–0 win away at Hearts. A clean sweep of all domestic trophies for season 2022-23 was completed on 3 June 2023 with Celtic defeating Inverness Caledonian Thistle 3–1 in the Scottish Cup Final, the club's eighth domestic treble (a World Record).

== Managers ==
Information correct as of match played 23 May 2026. Only official Scottish League, Scottish Cup, Scottish League Cup and European Competition matches are counted

Key

Key to record:

- P = Matches played
- W = Matches won
- D = Matches drawn
- L = Matches lost
- Win % = Win ratio

Key to honours:

- LG = Scottish League
- FA = Scottish Cup
- LC = Scottish League Cup
- EC = European Cup

*	Caretaker manager

List of Celtic F.C. managers
No.	Name	From	To	Record					Honours						Ref
No.	Name	From	To	P	W	D	L	Win %	LG	FA	LC	EC	Total	Matches per trophy	Ref
1	(Scotland) Willie Maley	April 1897	January 1940	1,617	1,042	315	260	64.44	16	14	–	–	30	53.9	
2	(Scotland) Jimmy McStay	February 1940	July 1945	N/A	N/A	N/A	N/A	N/A	0	0	–	–	0	N/A	
3	(Scotland) Jimmy McGrory	August 1945	March 1965	843	419	177	247	49.70	1	2	2	0	5	168.6	
4	(Scotland) Jock Stein	March 1965	August 1978	690	484	111	95	70.14	10	8	6	1	25	27.6	
-	(Republic of Ireland) Sean Fallon^{*}	July 1975	May 1976	53	32	8	13	60.38	0	0	0	0	0	N/A	
5	(Scotland) Billy McNeill	August 1978	May 1983	257	165	40	52	64.20	3	1	1	0	5	51.4	
6	(Scotland) David Hay	May 1983	May 1987	209	119	50	40	56.94	1	1	0	0	2	104.5	
-	(Scotland) Billy McNeill	May 1987	May 1991	197	109	41	47	55.33	1	2	0	0	3	65.6	
7	(Republic of Ireland) Liam Brady	June 1991	October 1993	126	68	31	27	53.97	0	0	0	0	0	N/A	
-	(Scotland) Frank Connor^{*}	October 1993		4	3	1	0	75.00	0	0	0	0	0	N/A	
8	(Scotland) Lou Macari	October 1993	June 1994	34	12	14	8	35.29	0	0	0	0	0	N/A	
9	(Scotland) Tommy Burns	July 1994	May 1997	140	78	39	23	55.71	0	1	0	0	1	140	
-	(Scotland) Billy Stark^{*}	May 1997		3	2	1	0	66.67	0	0	0	0	0	N/A	
10	(Netherlands) Wim Jansen	July 1997	May 1998	51	33	10	8	64.71	1	0	1	0	2	25.5	
11	(Slovakia) Jozef Vengloš	July 1998	June 1999	50	29	10	11	58.00	0	0	0	0	0	N/A	
12	(England) John Barnes	June 1999	February 2000	29	19	2	8	65.52	0	0	0	0	0	N/A	
-	(Scotland) Kenny Dalglish^{*}	February 2000	June 2000	18	10	4	4	55.56	0	0	1	0	1	18	
13	(Northern Ireland) Martin O'Neill	June 2000	May 2005	282	213	29	40	75.53	3	3	1	0	7	40.3	
14	(Scotland) Gordon Strachan	May 2005	May 2009	203	132	36	35	65.02	3	1	2	0	6	33.8	
15	(England) Tony Mowbray	June 2009	March 2010	45	23	9	13	51.11	0	0	0	0	0	N/A	
16	(Northern Ireland) Neil Lennon	March 2010	May 2014	227	159	29	39	70.04	3	2	0	0	5	45.4	
17	(Norway) Ronny Deila	June 2014	May 2016	118	75	23	20	63.56	2	0	1	0	3	39.3	
18	(Northern Ireland) Brendan Rodgers	May 2016	February 2019	169	118	25	26	69.82	2	2	3	0	7	24.1	
-	(Northern Ireland) Neil Lennon	February 2019	February 2021	110	77	17	16	70.00	2	2	1	0	5	22	
-	(Scotland) John Kennedy^{*}	February 2021	June 2021	10	4	4	2	40.00	0	0	0	0	0	N/A	
19	(Australia) Ange Postecoglou	June 2021	June 2023	113	83	12	18	73.45	2	1	2	0	5	22.6	
-	(Northern Ireland) Brendan Rodgers	June 2023	October 2025	124	83	23	18	66.94	2	1	1	0	4	25	
-	(Northern Ireland) Martin O'Neill^{*}	October 2025	December 2025	8	7	0	1	87.50	0	0	0	0	0	N/A	
20	(France) Wilfried Nancy	December 2025	January 2026	8	2	0	6	25.00	0	0	0	0	0	N/A	
-	(Northern Ireland) Martin O'Neill	January 2026		27	20	4	3	74.07	1	1	0	0	2	13.5	

== Notes ==
- All matches played during the tenure of Jimmy McStay were unofficial war-time games. Although there were still competitions; Scottish Southern League, Scottish Southern League Cup and Summer Cup, none of these competitions are recognised as official.
- Sean Fallon's season as caretaker manager in season 1975–76 was due to Jock Stein's recuperation from injuries sustained in a serious car accident.
- Neil Lennon initially took over from Tony Mowbray as manager in March 2010 on a temporary basis, but was appointed as full-time manager in June 2010.
