= Willie McStay =

Willie McStay may refer to:

- Willie McStay (footballer, born 1892) footballer who played for Celtic F.C. in the 1920s; brother of Jimmy McStay
- Willie McStay (footballer, born 1961) footballer who played for Celtic F.C. in the 1980s; brother of Paul McStay
