= 1957–58 Scottish League Cup =

Tournament details
- Country: Scotland

Final positions
- Champions: Celtic (2nd title)
- Runners-up: Rangers

The 1957–58 Scottish League Cup was the 12th season of Scotland's second football knockout competition. The competition was won by holders Celtic, who defeated Rangers in the final for their second title.

== First round ==
=== Group 1 ===
Team	Pld	W	D	L	GF	GA	GR	Pts
Aberdeen	6	6	0	0	22	12	1.833	12
Falkirk	6	2	1	3	13	11	1.182	5
Motherwell	6	2	0	4	11	17	0.647	4
Queen of the South	6	1	1	4	8	14	0.571	3

Home team	Score	Away team	Date
Aberdeen	5–1	Queen of the South	10 August 1957
Motherwell	1–4	Falkirk	10 August 1957
Falkirk	3–4	Aberdeen	14 August 1957
Queen of the South	3–0	Motherwell	14 August 1957
Falkirk	3–0	Queen of the South	17 August 1957
Motherwell	2–3	Aberdeen	17 August 1957
Falkirk	1–3	Motherwell	24 August 1957
Queen of the South	2–3	Aberdeen	24 August 1957
Aberdeen	2–1	Falkirk	28 August 1957
Motherwell	2–1	Queen of the South	28 August 1957
Aberdeen	5–3	Motherwell	31 August 1957
Queen of the South	1–1	Falkirk	31 August 1957

=== Group 2 ===
Team	Pld	W	D	L	GF	GA	GR	Pts
Rangers	6	4	0	2	18	10	1.800	8
Raith Rovers	6	4	0	2	16	10	1.600	8
St Mirren	6	3	0	3	5	14	0.357	6
Partick Thistle	6	1	0	5	4	9	0.444	2

Home team	Score	Away team	Date
Raith Rovers	1–0	Partick Thistle	10 August 1957
Rangers	6–0	St Mirren	10 August 1957
St Mirren	1–0	Raith Rovers	13 August 1957
Partick Thistle	0–1	Rangers	14 August 1957
Rangers	4–3	Raith Rovers	17 August 1957
St Mirren	1–0	Partick Thistle	17 August 1957
Partick Thistle	1–4	Raith Rovers	24 August 1957
St Mirren	0–4	Rangers	24 August 1957
Raith Rovers	4–1	St Mirren	28 August 1957
Rangers	0–3	Partick Thistle	28 August 1957
Partick Thistle	0–2	St Mirren	31 August 1957
Raith Rovers	4–3	Rangers	31 August 1957

=== Group 3 ===
Team	Pld	W	D	L	GF	GA	GR	Pts
Celtic	6	5	0	1	18	8	2.250	10
Hibernian	6	3	1	2	15	10	1.500	7
Airdrieonians	6	3	0	3	20	13	1.538	6
East Fife	6	0	1	5	6	28	0.214	1

Home team	Score	Away team	Date
Celtic	3–2	Airdrieonians	10 August 1957
Hibernian	4–0	East Fife	10 August 1957
Airdrieonians	4–1	Hibernian	14 August 1957
East Fife	1–4	Celtic	14 August 1957
East Fife	1–3	Airdrieonians	17 August 1957
Hibernian	3–1	Celtic	17 August 1957
Airdrieonians	1–2	Celtic	24 August 1957
East Fife	2–2	Hibernian	24 August 1957
Celtic	6–1	East Fife	28 August 1957
Hibernian	5–1	Airdrieonians	28 August 1957
Airdrieonians	9–1	East Fife	31 August 1957
Celtic	2–0	Hibernian	31 August 1957

=== Group 4 ===
Team	Pld	W	D	L	GF	GA	GR	Pts
Kilmarnock	6	3	3	0	12	6	2.000	9
Heart of Midlothian	6	2	3	1	17	9	1.889	7
Dundee	6	1	3	2	11	13	0.846	5
Queen's Park	6	0	3	3	8	20	0.400	3

Home team	Score	Away team	Date
Kilmarnock	2–1	Heart of Midlothian	10 August 1957
Queen's Park	2–5	Dundee	10 August 1957
Dundee	0–3	Kilmarnock	14 August 1957
Heart of Midlothian	9–2	Queen's Park	14 August 1957
Dundee	2–2	Heart of Midlothian	17 August 1957
Kilmarnock	3–1	Queen's Park	17 August 1957
Dundee	1–1	Queen's Park	24 August 1957
Heart of Midlothian	1–1	Kilmarnock	24 August 1957
Kilmarnock	1–1	Dundee	28 August 1957
Queen's Park	0–0	Heart of Midlothian	28 August 1957
Heart of Midlothian	4–2	Dundee	31 August 1957
Queen's Park	2–2	Kilmarnock	31 August 1957

=== Group 5 ===
Team	Pld	W	D	L	GF	GA	GR	Pts
Clyde	6	6	0	0	38	4	9.500	12
Dundee United	6	3	0	3	13	19	0.684	6
Dumbarton	6	2	0	4	18	21	0.857	4
Stranraer	6	1	0	5	8	33	0.242	2

Home team	Score	Away team	Date
Dundee United	1–4	Clyde	10 August 1957
Stranraer	3–1	Dumbarton	10 August 1957
Clyde	10–0	Stranraer	14 August 1957
Dumbarton	2–4	Dundee United	14 August 1957
Clyde	7–1	Dumbarton	17 August 1957
Stranraer	2–4	Dundee United	17 August 1957
Clyde	8–1	Dundee United	24 August 1957
Dumbarton	10–3	Stranraer	24 August 1957
Dundee United	0–3	Dumbarton	28 August 1957
Stranraer	0–5	Clyde	28 August 1957
Dumbarton	1–4	Clyde	31 August 1957
Dundee United	3–0	Stranraer	31 August 1957

=== Group 6 ===
Team	Pld	W	D	L	GF	GA	GR	Pts
Brechin City	6	3	1	2	18	12	1.500	7
Dunfermline Athletic	6	3	1	2	14	10	1.400	7
Ayr United	6	3	1	2	14	14	1.000	7
Cowdenbeath	6	0	3	3	8	18	0.444	3

Home team	Score	Away team	Date
Brechin City	5–2	Ayr United	10 August 1957
Dunfermline Athletic	1–1	Cowdenbeath	10 August 1957
Ayr United	4–1	Dunfermline Athletic	14 August 1957
Cowdenbeath	1–1	Brechin City	14 August 1957
Brechin City	2–1	Dunfermline Athletic	17 August 1957
Cowdenbeath	1–1	Ayr United	17 August 1957
Ayr United	4–2	Brechin City	24 August 1957
Cowdenbeath	2–5	Dunfermline Athletic	24 August 1957
Brechin City	7–1	Cowdenbeath	28 August 1957
Dunfermline Athletic	3–0	Ayr United	28 August 1957
Ayr United	3–2	Cowdenbeath	31 August 1957
Dunfermline Athletic	3–1	Brechin City	31 August 1957

=== Group 7 ===
Team	Pld	W	D	L	GF	GA	GR	Pts
Third Lanark	6	4	2	0	13	6	2.167	10
Morton	6	3	1	2	15	12	1.250	7
Stenhousemuir	6	2	1	3	14	15	0.933	5
Stirling Albion	6	1	0	5	2	11	0.182	2

Home team	Score	Away team	Date
Morton	0–1	Stirling Albion	10 August 1957
Stenhousemuir	3–3	Third Lanark	10 August 1957
Stirling Albion	0–1	Stenhousemuir	14 August 1957
Third Lanark	1–0	Morton	14 August 1957
Morton	7–5	Stenhousemuir	17 August 1957
Third Lanark	2–0	Stirling Albion	17 August 1957
Stirling Albion	1–3	Morton	24 August 1957
Third Lanark	3–0	Stenhousemuir	24 August 1957
Morton	3–3	Third Lanark	28 August 1957
Stenhousemuir	4–0	Stirling Albion	28 August 1957
Stenhousemuir	1–2	Morton	31 August 1957
Stirling Albion	0–1	Third Lanark	31 August 1957

=== Group 8 ===
Team	Pld	W	D	L	GF	GA	GR	Pts
Hamilton Academical	6	4	2	0	15	5	3.000	10
Arbroath	6	3	1	2	10	9	1.111	7
St Johnstone	6	2	0	4	13	16	0.813	4
Albion Rovers	6	1	1	4	10	18	0.556	3

Home team	Score	Away team	Date
Albion Rovers	2–4	St Johnstone	10 August 1957
Arbroath	1–1	Hamilton Academical	10 August 1957
Hamilton Academical	3–2	Albion Rovers	14 August 1957
St Johnstone	1–2	Arbroath	14 August 1957
Albion Rovers	2–0	Arbroath	17 August 1957
St Johnstone	0–3	Hamilton Academical	17 August 1957
Hamilton Academical	3–0	Arbroath	24 August 1957
St Johnstone	6–2	Albion Rovers	24 August 1957
Albion Rovers	1–1	Hamilton Academical	28 August 1957
Arbroath	3–1	St Johnstone	28 August 1957
Arbroath	4–1	Albion Rovers	31 August 1957
Hamilton Academical	4–1	St Johnstone	31 August 1957

=== Group 9 ===
Team	Pld	W	D	L	GF	GA	GR	Pts
Montrose	4	3	0	1	11	6	1.833	6
East Stirlingshire	4	2	1	1	12	7	1.714	5
Alloa Athletic	4	2	1	1	12	8	1.500	5
Forfar Athletic	4	2	0	2	10	11	0.909	4
Berwick Rangers	4	0	0	4	5	18	0.278	0

Home team	Score	Away team	Date
Berwick Rangers	3–5	Forfar Athletic	10 August 1957
East Stirlingshire	3–1	Montrose	10 August 1957
Alloa Athletic	3–3	East Stirlingshire	14 August 1957
Montrose	4–1	Forfar Athletic	14 August 1957
Alloa Athletic	5–0	Berwick Rangers	17 August 1957
Forfar Athletic	2–1	East Stirlingshire	17 August 1957
Berwick Rangers	1–3	Montrose	24 August 1957
Forfar Athletic	2–3	Alloa Athletic	24 August 1957
East Stirlingshire	5–1	Berwick Rangers	31 August 1957
Montrose	3–1	Alloa Athletic	31 August 1957

== Supplementary round ==
=== First leg ===
Home team	Score	Away team	Date
Montrose	1–0	Hamilton Academical	2 September 1957

=== Second leg ===
Home team	Score	Away team	Date	Agg
Hamilton Academical	3–0	Montrose	4 September 1957	3–1

== Quarter-finals ==
=== First leg ===
Home team	Score	Away team	Date
Aberdeen	1–2	Clyde	11 September 1957
Celtic	6–1	Third Lanark	11 September 1957
Hamilton Academical	2–4	Brechin City	11 September 1957
Kilmarnock	2–1	Rangers	11 September 1957

=== Second leg ===
Home team	Score	Away team	Date	Agg
Brechin City	1–0	Hamilton Academical	14 September 1957	5–2
Clyde	4–2	Aberdeen	14 September 1957	6–3
Rangers	3–1	Kilmarnock	14 September 1957	4–3
Third Lanark	0–3	Celtic	14 September 1957	1–9

== Semi-finals ==
Home team	Score	Away team	Date
Celtic	4–2	Clyde	28 September 1957
Rangers	4–0	Brechin City	28 September 1957

== Final ==
19 October 1957

Celtic	7–1	Rangers
Wilson 22'; Mochan 44', 75'; McPhail 53', 67', 80'; Fernie 90' (pen.)	Report	Simpson 58'

Hampden Park, Glasgow
Attendance: 82,293
Referee: Jack Mowat
