= Johnny Valentine (footballer) =

Scottish footballer (1930–2019)

Personal information
- Full name: John Cheyne Valentine
- Date of birth: 13 March 1930
- Place of birth: Rathview, Scotland
- Date of death: 17 February 2019 (aged 88)
- Place of death: Forres, Scotland
- Position: Centre half

Senior career*
Years	Team	Apps	(Gls)
- Buckie Thistle
1953–1957	Queen's Park	105	(0)
1957–1958	Rangers	2	(0)
1958–1960	St Johnstone	49	(0)
- * Club domestic league appearances and goals

John Cheyne Valentine (13 March 1930 – 17 February 2019) was a Scottish footballer, who played for Queen's Park, Rangers and St Johnstone in the Scottish League.

He is known for his ill-fated appearance at the 1957 Scottish League Cup Final, where he played centre-half for the Rangers team which lost 7–1 to Celtic. Valentine made only 10 appearances for Rangers, all in the 1957–58 season.

Valentine died in February 2019, aged 88.
