= Cringan =

Cringan is a surname. Notable people with the surname include:

- Jimmy Cringan (1904–1972), Scottish football player
- William Cringan (1890–1958), Scottish international football player
