= 1957–58 Rangers F.C. season =

Rangers
1957–58 season
- Manager: Scot Symon
- Ground: Ibrox Park
- Scottish League Division One: 2nd P34 W22 D5 L7 F89 A49 Pts49
- Scottish Cup: Semi-finals
- League Cup: Runners-up
- European Cup: Second round
- Top goalscorer: League: All: Ralph Brand (40)

The 1957–58 season was the 78th season of competitive football by Rangers.

== Overview ==
Rangers played a total of 54 competitive matches during the 1957–58 season.

== Results ==
All results are written with Rangers' score first.

=== Scottish First Division ===
Date	Opponent	Venue	Result	Attendance	Scorers
7 September 1957	Queen of the South	H	4–2	25,000	
21 September 1957	Celtic	H	2–3	60,000	
12 October 1957	St Mirren	A	3–1	28,000	
26 October 1957	Heart of Midlothian	H	2–3	62,000	
2 November 1957	Queen's Park	A	4–2	30,824	
9 November 1957	Kilmarnock	H	3–4	45,000	
16 November 1957	Clyde	H	2–0	54,000	
23 November 1957	Falkirk	A	4–0	22,000	
30 November 1957	East Fife	H	3–3	26,000	
7 December 1957	Motherwell	A	2–2	21,000	
14 December 1957	Dundee	A	2–1	21,000	
21 December 1957	Third Lanark	H	5–1	22,000	
28 December 1957	Aberdeen	A	2–1	21,000	
1 January 1958	Celtic	A	1–0	50,000	
2 January 1958	Partick Thistle	H	2–0	30,000	
4 January 1958	Queen of the South	A	1–1	13,000	
11 January 1958	Hibernian	H	3–1	42,000	
18 January 1958	Airdrieonians	A	4–3	14,000	
22 February 1958	Queen's Park	H	5–1	30,000	
8 March 1958	Clyde	A	3–1	31,500	
10 March 1958	Kilmarnock	A	3–3	15,335	
19 March 1958	Falkirk	H	3–2	30,000	
22 March 1958	East Fife	A	1–0	12,000	
29 March 1958	Motherwell	H	2–2	40,000	
12 April 1958	Third Lanark	A	5–1	36,000	
16 April 1958	Raith Rovers	H	4–1	16,000	
21 April 1958	Hibernian	A	1–3	24,000	
23 April 1958	Raith Rovers	A	3–1	8,000	
26 April 1958	Aberdeen	H	5–0	15,000	
28 April 1958	St Mirren	H	1–0	10,000	
30 April 1958	Heart of Midlothian	A	1–2	30,000	
3 May 1958	Airdrieonians	H	1–2	10,000	
5 May 1958	Partick Thistle	A	2–1	6,500	
10 May 1958	Dundee	H	0–1	11,000	

=== Scottish Cup ===
Date	Round	Opponent	Venue	Result	Attendance	Scorers
1 February 1958	R1	Cowdenbeath	A	3–1	16,866	
15 February 1958	R2	Forfar Athletic	A	9–1	8,066	
1 March 1958	R3	Dunfermline Athletic	A	1–2	24,377	
15 March 1958	QF	Queen of the South	A	4–3	23,000	
5 April 1958	SF	Hibernian	N	2–2	76,727	
9 April 1958	SFR	Hibernian	N	1–2	74,895	

=== League Cup ===
Date	Round	Opponent	Venue	Result	Attendance	Scorers
10 August 1957	SR	St Mirren	H	6–0	55,000	
14 August 1957	SR	Partick Thistle	A	1–0	35,000	
17 August 1957	SR	Raith Rovers	H	4–3	47,000	
24 August 1957	SR	St Mirren	A	4–0	23,000	
28 August 1957	SR	Partick Thistle	H	0–3	35,000	
31 August 1957	SR	Raith Rovers	A	3–4	24,000	
11 September 1957	QF1	Kilmarnock	A	1–2	26,803	
14 September 1957	QF2	Kilmarnock	H	3–1	66,000	
28 September 1957	SF	Brechin City	N	4–0	28,403	
19 October 1957	F	Celtic	N	1–7	90,185	

=== European Cup ===
Date	Round	Opponent	Venue	Result	Attendance	Scorers
4 September 1957	R1L1	Saint-Etienne	H	3–1	85,000	
25 September 1957	R1L2	Saint-Etienne	A	1–2	35,000	
27 November 1957	R2L1	AC Milan	H	1–4	85,000	
11 December 1957	R2L2	AC Milan	A	0–2	3,000	

== See also ==
- 1957–58 in Scottish football
- 1957–58 Scottish Cup
- 1957–58 Scottish League Cup
- 1957–58 European Cup
