= Charlie Shaw (footballer, born 1885) =

Scottish footballer

Personal information
- Full name: Charles Shaw
- Date of birth: 21 September 1885
- Place of birth: Twechar, Scotland
- Date of death: 27 March 1938 (aged 52)
- Place of death: New York City, United States
- Position: Goalkeeper

Youth career
- Baillieston Thistle
- Kirkintilloch Harp

Senior career*
| Years | Team | Apps | (Gls) |
| 1906–1907 | Port Glasgow Athletic | 37 | (0) |
| 1907–1913 | Queens Park Rangers | 232 | (0) |
| 1913–1925 | Celtic | 423 | (0) |
| 1925–1926 | New Bedford Whalers | 27 | (0) |
| Total | | 719 | (0) |

International career
| 1914–1920 | Scottish League XI | 3 | (0) |

Managerial career
- –: New Bedford Whalers
- * Club domestic league appearances and goals

Charles Shaw (21 September 1885 – 27 March 1938) was a Scottish footballer who played as a goalkeeper, mainly for Queens Park Rangers and Celtic.

He served as Celtic's team captain for several years in the 1920s. He took over the position from Davey Adams and was succeeded by Peter Shevlin. Shaw went 1,287 minutes in all competitions without conceding a goal in early 1914, a British football record which stood for nearly a century. Never capped by Scotland, he represented the Scottish Football League three times in matches against The Football League.

Including selection teams, he made over 1.000 appearances in his career.

== Career ==
After a debut senior season with Port Glasgow Athletic, Shaw played in England at Queens Park Rangers for six years, missing only two league games in that time and winning the Southern League title twice before returning to Scotland to join Celtic in May 1913 for a £250 fee. On a return to London when Celtic played West Ham United in a charity game, the Londoners remembered him fondly and burst into applause as he entered the pitch. For Celtic he was even greater and a stalwart for many a year.

Shaw made his debut for the Bhoys in a 2–1 Glasgow Charity Cup win at Third Lanark on 6 May that year. With the fragile-looking Shaw in goals, Celtic's defensive record improved dramatically. But Shaw also had the intelligence to match his athleticism. He was a good reader of the game and he developed an understanding with Alec McNair and the other defenders. "Get it back tae Charlie!" was a common call.

According to legendary Celtic manager Willie Maley: "Shaw, McNair and Dodds understood one another so well that they developed the pass-back into a scientific move of which there have been many imitators but none to equal the originators. It was indeed a spectacle to see either McNair or Dodds passing, with unerring accuracy and cheeky coolness, the ball to Shaw two yards away, with the opposing forwards almost on top of them. That was their method of getting out of a corner, which in all probability would otherwise have been fatal." (Weekly News 25 July 1936)

He became Celtic captain in September 1916 following "Sunny" Jim Young's retirement (1916) and his commanding voice was heard throughout games offering encouragement and instructions to his teammates. Shaw was also vocal off the pitch, and his criticism of the low wages many footballers were paid did not go down well among the affluent and influential in the Parkhead boardroom. This likely stemmed from his background coming from the mining village of Twechar.

Taking all cups into account he played in 468 matches for Celtic, ranking 20th on the club's all-time list and making the most Scottish Football League appearances for the Hoops without being selected for his country (Jimmy McStay holds the unwanted record in terms of overall matches).

After leaving Celtic, Shaw emigrated to the United States to be player/manager of the New Bedford Whalers. He died of pneumonia in 1938, in New York City.

=== Shoutout record ===
In the 1913–14 season, Shaw lost only 14 goals in 38 games, with 26 shut-outs along the away, which remains a record for Celtic. It is estimated that from 13 December 1913 he and his defence did not concede a goal for 1,287 minutes (the record was not measured the way it is today, with the time after the first goal and the time before the last goal not being counted). The duck was broken on 28 February 1914 when Falkirk defeated Celtic 1–0. This was a UK record then and lasted for almost 100 years before being broken by Edwin van der Sar.

Below is a breakdown of the 1,287 minutes Shaw went unbeaten:

- Raith Rovers 1–2 Celtic, League, 13 December 1913, 66mins (Raith scored in the 24th minute)
- Celtic 0–0 Motherwell, League, 20 December, 90mins
- Ayr United 0–6 Celtic League, 27 December, 90mins
- Celtic 4–0 Rangers, League, 1 January 1914, 90mins
- Partick Thistle 0–0 Celtic, League, 3 January, 90mins
- Clyde 0–1 Celtic, League, 5 January, 90mins
- Celtic 4–0 Dumbarton, League, 10 January, 90mins
- Dundee 0–1 Celtic, League, 17 January, 90mins
- Celtic 1–0 Airdrieonians, League, 24 January, 90mins
- St Mirren 0–3 Celtic League, 31 January, 90mins
- Clyde 0–0 Celtic Scottish Cup, 7 February, 90mins
- Celtic 2–0 Clyde, Scottish Cup, 10 February, 90mins
- Celtic 3–0 Greenock Morton, League, 14 February, 90mins
- Forfar Athletic 0–5 Celtic, Scottish Cup, 21 February, 90mins
- Falkirk 1–0 Celtic, League, 28 February 1914, 51mins (Falkirk scored in the 51st minute)
