= John Donnelly (footballer, born 1936) =

Scottish footballer

Personal information
- Full name: John Donnelly
- Date of birth: 17 December 1936
- Place of birth: Broxburn, Scotland
- Date of death: 31 July 2009 (aged 72)
- Place of death: Broxburn, Scotland
- Position: Right back

Youth career
- Armadale Thistle

Senior career*
Years	Team	Apps	(Gls)
1957–1962	Celtic	31	(0)
1962–1967	Preston North End	58	(1)
- Addington
Total		89	(1)
- * Club domestic league appearances and goals

John Donnelly (17 December 1936 – 31 July 2009) was a Scottish footballer who played for Celtic and Preston North End. Donnelly was part of the Celtic side that defeated Rangers 7–1 in the 1957 Scottish League Cup Final.
