= Francis McStay =

Scottish footballer (1891-1935)

Personal information
- Full name: Francis McStay
- Date of birth: 1890
- Place of birth: Ireland
- Date of death: 17 November 1935 (aged 43–44)
- Place of death: Glasgow, Scotland
- Position: Right half

Senior career*
Years	Team	Apps	(Gls)
–	Larkhall United		
1911–1919	Motherwell	214	(6)
1916	→ Armadale (loan)		
- * Club domestic league appearances and goals

Francis McStay (1890 – 17 November 1935) was a Scottish footballer who played as a right half for Motherwell, spending eight years with the club spanning the World War I period. He was the older brother of Willie and Jimmy McStay, both captains of Celtic, playing against Willie on several occasions.
