= Pat McAuley =

Scottish footballer (1921–1970)

Personal information
- Full name: Patrick Comerford McAuley
- Date of birth: 31 July 1921
- Place of birth: New Stevenston, Scotland
- Date of death: 16 March 1970 (aged 48)
- Place of death: Newarthill, Scotland
- Position: Wing half

Youth career
- Arthurlie

Senior career*
Years	Team	Apps	(Gls)
1946–1950	Celtic	78	(4)
1950–1951	Luton Town	8	(1)
1951–1953	Kettering Town		
1953–1954	Albion Rovers	3	(0)
Total		89	(5)

International career
1948	Scottish League XI	1	(0)
- * Club domestic league appearances and goals

Patrick Comerford McAuley (31 July 1921 – 16 March 1970) was a Scottish footballer, who played for Celtic, Luton Town, Kettering Town and Albion Rovers.
