= Peter Shevlin =

Scottish footballer

Personal information
- Date of birth: 18 November 1902
- Place of birth: Hamilton, Scotland
- Date of death: 10 October 1948 (aged 45)
- Place of death: Withington Community Hospital, England
- Height: 5 ft 7 in (1.70 m)
- Position: Goalkeeper

Senior career*
| Years | Team | Apps | (Gls) |
| – | Pollok | | |
| – | St Roch's | | |
| 1924–1927 | Celtic | 86 | (0) |
| 1927–1929 | South Shields | 66 | (0) |
| 1929–1931 | Nelson | 53 | (0) |
| 1931–1933 | Shelbourne | | |
| 1933–1935 | Hamilton Academical | 71 | (0) |
| 1934 | → Celtic (loan) | 0 | (0) |
| 1935–1936 | Albion Rovers | 16 | (0) |
| Total | | 292 | (0) |

Managerial career
- 1931–1933: Shelbourne
- * Club domestic league appearances and goals

Peter Shevlin (1902–1948) was a Scottish footballer who played as a goalkeeper.

He is mainly remembered for his time with Celtic, joining the club from the Junior grade in Glasgow. He had a relatively short period as their first choice goalkeeper, in between the spells of Charlie Shaw and John Thomson. He did take part in winning the Scottish Cup in 1925, the Scottish Football League in 1925–26 and the Glasgow Cup in 1926–27 (having played in the team that lost in the finals of both that competition and the Scottish Cup in the previous year).

He later played for South Shields and Nelson in England, was player-manager of Shelbourne in Ireland, then returned to Scotland with Hamilton Academical (where injury cost him a place in the 1935 Scottish Cup Final) and Albion Rovers.
