= Ray McStay =

Scottish footballer (born 1970)

Personal information
- Full name: Raymond James McStay
- Date of birth: 16 May 1970 (age 56)
- Place of birth: Hamilton, Scotland
- Position: Midfielder

Youth career
- Celtic Boys Club

Senior career*
Years	Team	Apps	(Gls)
1987–1995	Celtic	0	(0)
1995–1996	Hamilton Academical	30	(5)
1996	→Hereford United (loan)	0	(0)
1996–1997	Cardiff City	1	(0)
- * Club domestic league appearances and goals

Raymond James McStay (born 18 May 1970) is a Scottish former footballer who played as a midfielder.

== Playing career ==
McStay began his career at Celtic, where his older brothers Willie and Paul, as well as his great-uncles Willie and Jimmy had already played. A product of Celtic Boys Club, McStay signed professional forms at the same time as youth teammate Gerry Creaney. Despite being regularly mentioned as having a big future at the club McStay had to wait until the 1992–93 season before being called into the Celtic first team and even then he only made the bench for a single league game against St Johnstone and was not called upon to play.

McStay left Celtic in January 1995 to sign for Hamilton Academical on a free transfer. He made 30 league appearances in nearly two years at the club although he spent summer of 1996 having an unsuccessful trial with Stade Lavallois. He subsequently had a trial with Wycombe Wanderers and was poised to sign for the club in October 1996 but the move fell through for undisclosed reasons. In late 1996 he was loaned to Hereford United where he did not play a league game before, during the 1996–97 season, playing a single game for Cardiff City. McStay quit football soon after this.

In summer 1997, whilst on honeymoon in the Dominican Republic, McStay was admitted to hospital with severe stomach cramps and fever and was reported as suffering a "mystery illness" and was described as critically ill.

== Post-football ==
McStay was the UK commercial director of Midgibyte, a Glasgow-based design consultancy business run by Paul McStay. He now works at a Glasgow digital agency called MadeBrave.
