= Joe Dodds (Scottish footballer) =

Scottish footballer

Personal information
- Full name: Joseph Dodds
- Date of birth: 14 July 1887
- Place of birth: Carluke, Scotland
- Date of death: 14 October 1965 (aged 78)
- Place of death: Glasgow, Scotland
- Positions: Left back; centre half

Senior career*
Years	Team	Apps	(Gls)
–	Carluke Milton Rovers		
1908–1920	Celtic	322	(23)
1920–1921	Cowdenbeath		
1921–1922	Celtic	30	(4)
1922–1928	Queen of the South	50	(8)

International career
1912–1920	Scottish League XI	8	(2)
1914	Scotland	3	(0)

Managerial career
- 1922–1923: Queen of the South
- * Club domestic league appearances and goals

Joseph Dodds (14 July 1887 – 14 October 1965) was a Scottish footballer who played club football for Celtic (in two spells), Cowdenbeath and Queen of the South. Dodds was unbeaten in his three full international caps for Scotland, and was regarded as a quick and dependable left back.

== Career ==
Born in Carluke, Lanarkshire, Dodds joined Celtic in the summer of 1908 from Carluke Milton Rovers. He made 351 league appearances. Dodds was considered among the Celtic greats of his era and along with Charlie Shaw and Alec McNair was considered to have formed one of the greatest club defences in British football. At Celtic Dodds picked up many senior medals.

While at Celtic, Dodds gained three full Scotland caps, including playing in the 3–1 win over England on 4 April 1914. This followed draws against Wales (0–0 at home on 28 February) and Ireland (1–1 away on 14 March) of the same year, giving Dodds an unbeaten full international record. Dodds also represented the Scottish League XI eight times between 1912 and 1920.

Dodds left Celtic in 1920 to join Cowdenbeath then of the Central Football League, who were offering him more money. He returned to Celtic a year later for one last season, but resigned in August 1922 after a dispute about a benefit.

Dodds went to Queen of the South in a move that surprised many as he had been expected to sign for then-top division club Morton. Dodds joined as player-coach, with the signing creating a sensation as it was viewed as a major coup for the fledgling Dumfries club, then in their third season. Dodds made his Queens debut on 28 October 1922 against Royal Albert at their Raploch Park. In 1922–23, Dodds played alongside another experienced signing, ex-Liverpool F.A. Cup finalist Bob McDougall, in the last season Queens when played in a regional set up. Queens were unbeaten in winning the Western League that season. With Bob McDermid also having joined them, Dodds was with Queen of the South when they entered the Scottish Football League in the newly created Third Division. The club finished third and won the Scottish Qualifying Cup. Dodds remained at Queens until his retirement in 1928.

In 1936 Dodds went back to Celtic as assistant trainer, working with friend and former teammate Jimmy McMenemy. During the War, he served in France in the Royal Field Artillery as a Driver.

== Honours ==
Celtic

- Scottish League: 1908–09, 1909–10, 1913–14, 1914–15, 1915–16, 1916–17, 1918–19, 1921–22
- Scottish Cup: 1910–11, 1911–12, 1913–14
- Glasgow Cup: 1915–16, 1916–17
- Charity Cup: 1911–12, 1912–13, 1913–14, 1914–15, 1915–16, 1916–17, 1917–18
- War Fund Shield: 1917–18

Queen of the South

- Western League: 1922–23
- Scottish Qualifying Cup: 1923–24
