= Willie McStay (footballer, born 1961) =

Scottish footballer and manager

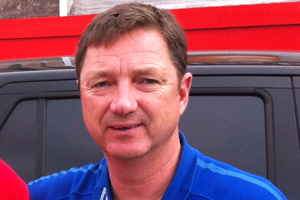
- McStay in 2011

Personal information
- Full name: William John McStay
- Date of birth: 26 November 1961 (age 64)
- Place of birth: Hamilton, Scotland
- Height: 5 ft 10 in (1.78 m)
- Position: Defender

Youth career
- Celtic Boys Club

Senior career*
Years	Team	Apps	(Gls)
1981–1987	Celtic	67	(2)
1987	Huddersfield Town	9	(0)
1987–1990	Notts County	45	(1)
1990	→ Hartlepool United (loan)	3	(0)
1990	→ Partick Thistle (loan)	5	(0)
1990–1992	Kilmarnock	29	(0)
1992–1994	Sligo Rovers	48	(0)
Total		206	(3)

Managerial career
- 1992–1994: Sligo Rovers
- 2007–2009: Celtic Reserves
- 2009–2010: Újpest FC
- 2010–2011: Ross County
- 2013–2014: Celtic Nation
- * Club domestic league appearances and goals

William John McStay (born 26 November 1961) is a Scottish former footballer and manager of clubs including Sligo Rovers, Újpest FC, Ross County and Celtic Nation.

== Playing career ==
Born in Hamilton, McStay played for Celtic from 1979 to 1987. McStay made his debut on 2 April 1983 when he came on as a sub in Celtic's 3–1 home win over Motherwell and went on to make 65 league appearances, including 10 as a substitute, scoring two goals. McStay transferred to Huddersfield Town in March 1987 and later played for Notts County and Hartlepool United.

== Coaching career ==
McStay was player/manager at Sligo Rovers from 1992 to 1994 and he led them to a historic treble in 1993–94, when they won the First Division, First Division Shield and the FAI Cup. In 1994, the Scot left Sligo just before the start of the new season after being approached by Celtic to become their youth team coach.

McStay was appointed the head coach of Celtic Reserves in January 2007, and worked in that role at the club until July 2009, when he left to take up the role as manager of Újpest FC in Budapest, Hungary. His assistant at Celtic and at Újpest was Joe McBride. McStay resigned as Head Coach of Újpest in April 2010, and was replaced by Géza Mészöly.

McStay returned to Celtic in April 2010 to take charge of the reserve side again after leaving Újpest, before departing 2 months later.

On 25 November 2010, McStay was appointed manager of Ross County. McStay left the club by mutual consent after less than three months as manager. McStay had taken charge of only nine games, none of which were won, during that time.

McStay was appointed assistant manager of Stockport County in July 2011 by manager Dietmar Hamann. After Hamann's departure, in November, new manager Jim Gannon kept McStay on as his assistant.

McStay took over as manager of Northern League Division One team Celtic Nation in September 2013. McStay led his side to their first trophy as Celtic Nation on 29 April 2014, defeating Aspatria 3–0 in the Cumberland Cup Final. McStay went on to lead the side to a second-place finish in the league, and went undefeated in their final 14 league games of the season. However, this was not enough to gain promotion to the Northern Premier League. Over the following weeks, a financial review was carried out at the club which resulted in many of their players leaving. Matters reached a head in July 2014 when owner Frank Lynch sold the club on to former chairman Steve Skinner. Amidst the turmoil at the club, McStay resigned.

== Personal life ==
McStay is a member of a notable football family, being the elder brother of former Celtic and Scotland midfielder Paul. Their younger brother Ray had a less notable career as a footballer after also starting out at Celtic, and their father John worked as a scout for the club. Great-uncles Willie and Jimmy McStay also played for Celtic and both captained the team in the 1920s, with Jimmy later also serving as manager.

Willie's son John was also a footballer who played as a defender for Motherwell and Ayr United in the 2000s before becoming an academy coach at Celtic; he should not be confused with Johnny McStay who played for various clubs at Junior level in the 2010s; who is the son of Willie's cousin, former player Jock McStay. His nephew Chris (Paul's son) is also a footballer.

== Honours ==
=== Player ===
Celtic

- Scottish Cup: 1984–85
- Scottish Premier Division: 1985–86

Sligo Rovers

- League of Ireland First Division: 1993–94
- League of Ireland First Division Shield: 1993–94
- FAI Cup: 1993–94

=== Manager ===
Sligo Rovers

- League of Ireland First Division: 1993–94
- League of Ireland First Division Shield: 1993–94
- FAI Cup: 1993–94

Celtic

Reserves

- SPL Reserve League: 2006–07, 2007–08, 2008–09

Youth

- SPL Under-19 League: 2003–04, 2004–05, 2005–06
- SPL Under-18 League: 1999–2000, 2002–03
- SFL Youth League: 1994–95
- Scottish Youth Cup: 1995–96, 1996–97, 1998–99, 2002–03, 2004–05, 2005–06
- Glasgow Cup: 1996–97, 1997–98

Celtic Nation

- Cumberland Senior Cup: 2013–14
