= Sammy Wilson (footballer, born 1931) =

Scottish footballer

Personal information
- Full name: Samuel Wilson
- Date of birth: 16 December 1931
- Place of birth: Glasgow, Scotland
- Date of death: 8 November 2014 (aged 82)
- Place of death: Uddingston, Scotland
- Position: Inside left

Youth career
- 1949–1951: Renfrew Juniors

Senior career*
Years	Team	Apps	(Gls)
1951–1957	St Mirren	52	(10)
1957–1959	Celtic	48	(26)
1959–1960	Millwall	23	(11)
1960–1961	Northampton Town		
1961	Mansfield Town		
1961–1963	Ross County		
1963–1966	Brora Rangers		
Total		123	(47)
- * Club domestic league appearances and goals

Samuel Wilson (16 December 1931 – 8 November 2014) was a Scottish footballer, who played professionally for St Mirren, Celtic, Millwall, Northampton Town and Mansfield Town. Although he only spent two years with Celtic, Wilson may be best-remembered for his role in one famous victory, when he scored their first goal in their record 7–1 victory over Rangers in the 1957 Scottish League Cup Final. Wilson finished his footballing career in the first half of the 1960s, having moved to the north of Scotland to sign for Highland Football League clubs Ross County and then Brora Rangers.
