= Jimmy McStay =

Scottish footballer and manager (1895–1973)

Personal information
- Full name: James McStay
- Date of birth: 1 April 1895
- Place of birth: Netherburn, Scotland
- Date of death: 31 December 1973 (aged 80)
- Place of death: Stonehouse, Scotland
- Positions: Left half; full back

Senior career*
Years	Team	Apps	(Gls)
1917–1920	Larkhall Thistle		
1920	→ Royal Scots Fusiliers		
1920–1934	Celtic	409	(7)
1934–1937	Hamilton Academical	63	(0)
1937–1938	Brideville		

International career
1926–1931	Scottish League XI	3	(0)

Managerial career
- 1937–1938: Brideville
- 1938–1940: Alloa Athletic
- 1940–1945: Celtic
- 1946–1951: Hamilton Academical
- * Club domestic league appearances and goals

James McStay (1 April 1895 – 31 December 1973) was a Scottish professional football player and manager. He spent most of his career at Celtic, and was a captain and manager for the club.

== Career ==
A full back (successfully converted from left half by manager Willie Maley), he joined Celtic in 1920 and took over the club captaincy from his elder brother Willie McStay in 1929. The siblings played together 246 times for Celtic as well in as one Scottish League XI match in 1926 and a Scottish Football Association summer tour of North America in 1927; however unlike Willie, Jimmy never gained a full international cap. Taking all cups into account he played in exactly 500 matches for Celtic, ranking 14th on the club's all-time list and making the most appearances overall for the Hoops without being selected for his country (Charlie Shaw holds the unwanted record in terms of Scottish Football League matches).

McStay managed Celtic between 9 February 1940 and 23 July 1945 but this coincided with the suspension of the League and Scottish Cup during wartime, meaning he never had the opportunity to manage the club in official competitions. He also managed Irish club Brideville and Alloa Athletic prior to his appointment at Celtic, and afterwards took charge of Hamilton Academical (where he had also finished his playing career, appearing for Accies in the 1935 Scottish Cup Final aged 40).

In addition to Willie and Jimmy, another McStay brother, Francis, was also a footballer, played for Motherwell in the 1910s. Their great-great-nephews Paul and Willie and Raymond played professionally in the 1980s and 1990s (Paul also captaining Celtic and gaining 76 caps for Scotland).

== Honours ==
=== Player ===
Celtic

- Scottish League: 1925–26
- Scottish Cup: 1922-23, 1924–25, 1926–27, 1930–31, 1932–33
- Glasgow Cup: 1927–28, 1930–31

=== Manager ===
Alloa Athletic

- Scottish Division Two promotion : 1938–39

Celtic

- Glasgow Cup: 1940–41
- Glasgow Charity Cup: 1942–43
- Victory in Europe Cup: 1945

Hamilton Academical

- Lanarkshire Cup: 1951–52

== Managerial statistics ==
Team	From	To	Record				
Team	From	To	G	W	D	L	Win %
Alloa Athletic	August 1938	February 1940	43	26	5	12	60.47
Celtic	February 1940	June 1945	0	0	0	0	—
Hamilton Academical	February 1946	April 1951	194	68	47	79	35.05
Total			237	94	52	91	39.66

- Does not include wartime matches with Alloa; P20, W10, D2, L8, WP50%
- No competitive games played during his time at Celtic; wartime totals P220, W112, D38, L70, WP50.9%
- Does not include wartime matches with Hamilton; P11, W2, D2, L7, WP18.1%
- Wartime grand total: P251, W124, D42, L85, WP49.4%
