= Willie McStay (footballer, born 1892) =

Scottish footballer

Personal information
- Full name: William McStay
- Date of birth: 21 June 1892
- Place of birth: Netherburn, Scotland
- Date of death: 3 September 1960 (aged 68)
- Place of death: Glasgow, Scotland
- Positions: Centre-back; centre-half; wing-half

Senior career*
Years	Team	Apps	(Gls)
–	Larkhall Thistle		
1912–1929	Celtic	399	(36)
1912	→ Vale of Leven	2	(0)
1912–1916	→ Ayr United (loan)	126	(0)
1917–1918	→ Distillery (wartime)		
1917–1918	→ Belfast Celtic (wartime)		
1923	→ New York F.C.		
1929–1930	Heart of Midlothian	14	(0)

International career
1919–1928	Scottish League XI	10	(0)
1921–1928	Scotland	13	(0)

Managerial career
- 1932–1933: Glentoran
- 1933–1935: Coleraine
- * Club domestic league appearances and goals

William McStay (21 June 1892 – 3 September 1960) was a Scottish international footballer who played as a fullback.

== Club career ==
McStay began his senior career when he joined Celtic from Larkhall Thistle in 1912, although he was immediately loaned to Ayr United, spending the following four seasons with the Somerset Park club. Having helped Celtic to the Scottish Football League title in 1917, He had further spells away from Celtic Park during the latter years of the First World War, assisting local sides Distillery and Belfast Celtic while conscripted to the North Irish Horse unit, before re-establishing himself in the Celtic first team which won the title again 1919 and 1922.

McStay was suspended by Celtic following a wages dispute in the aftermath of their 1923 Scottish Cup Final victory, and he spent the summer in the United States; he played one game with New York Field Club in the American Soccer League. He was appointed captain of Celtic upon his return to the club later that year, taking over from William Cringan, and held the role for six years. During this time he won one further League Championship (in 1926) and two more Scottish Cups. Taking all cups into account, he played in 470 matches for the club.

In 1929 he was sold to Hearts for £250, and retired from playing in 1930. He was later manager of Glentoran for a period in the mid-1930s.

== International career ==
McStay earned his first selection for the Scottish national side in 1921. He made his debut in a 2–1 defeat of Wales at Pittodrie and also played in the match against Ireland two weeks later. He was not selected again until 1925 but would eventually win a total of 13 caps for his country. McStay also appeared 10 times for the Scottish League XI.

== Personal life ==
McStay was succeeded as Celtic captain by his younger brother Jimmy in 1929, and they played 264 competitive matches together in the team's defensive line, as well as one Scottish League XI match in 1926. Their older brother Francis played for Motherwell in the 1910s. In addition to his siblings, McStay has several family footballing connections: his great-nephews Paul and Willie also played for Celtic in the 1980s and 1990s (Paul also captaining the club and gaining 76 caps for Scotland), their younger brother Raymond also played professionally, their father John was a scout for the club and their cousin Jock McStay was also a professional in the same era.

== Honours ==
=== Player ===
Celtic

- Scottish League: 1916–17, 1918–19, 1921–22, 1925–26
- Scottish Cup: 1922–23, 1924–25, 1926–27
- Glasgow Cup: 1919–20, 1920–21, 1926–27, 1927–28, 1928–29

Belfast Celtic

- Irish Cup: 1917–18

Scotland

- British Home Championship: 1920–21, 1924–25, 1925–26, 1926–27 (shared)

=== Manager ===
Glentoran

- Irish Cup: 1932–33

== See also ==
- List of Scotland national football team captains
- List of Scottish football families
