= Sean Fallon (footballer) =

Irish footballer (1922–2013)

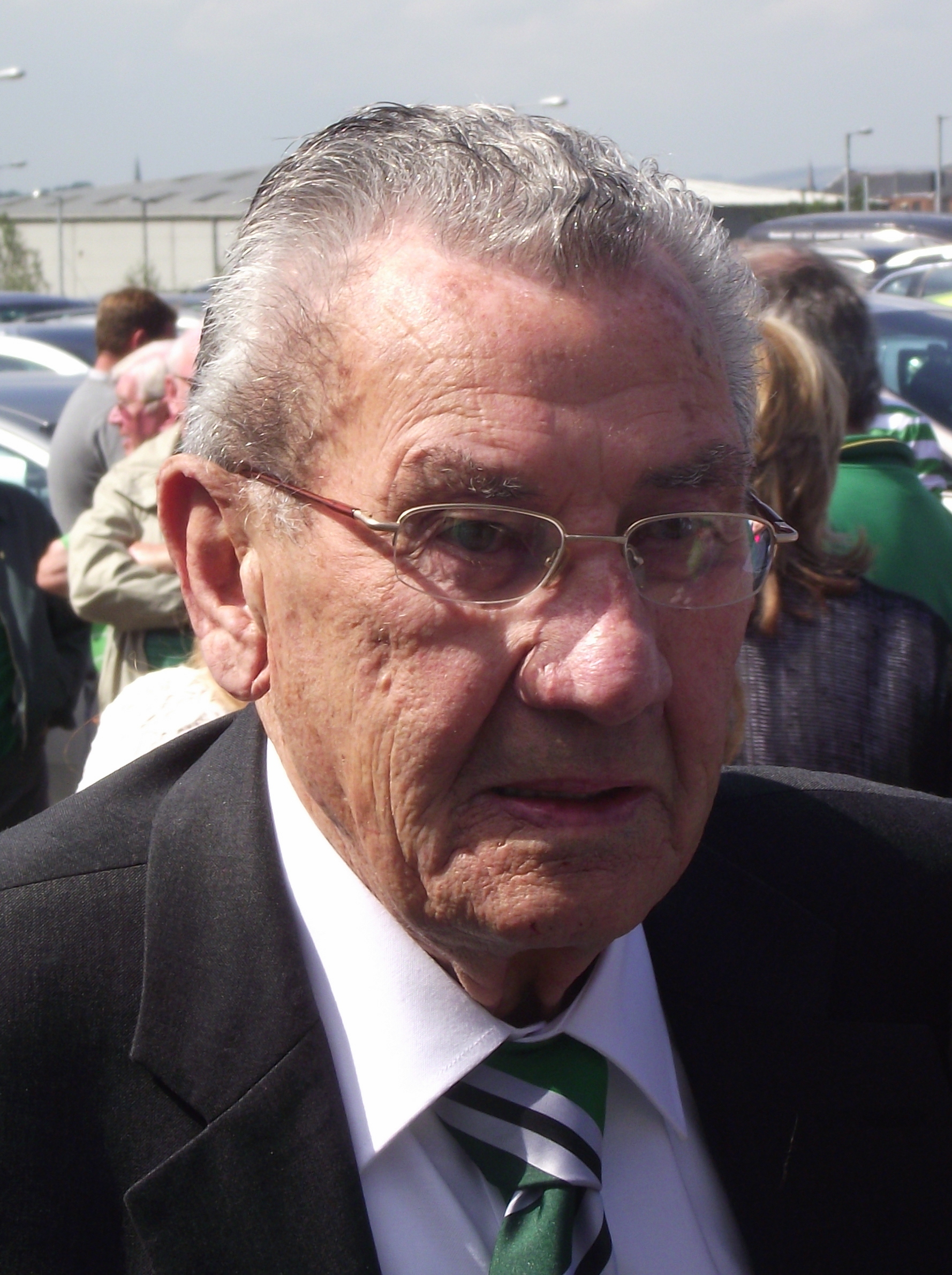
- Fallon in 2012

Personal information
- Date of birth: 31 July 1922
- Place of birth: Sligo, County Sligo, Ireland
- Date of death: 18 January 2013 (aged 90)

Senior career*
Years	Team	Apps	(Gls)
1946	Longford Town		
1947	Sligo Distillery		
1948–1949	Sligo Rovers	17	(4)
1949–1950	Glenavon	17	(0)
1950–1958	Celtic	254	(14)
Total		288	(18)

International career
1950–1955	Republic of Ireland	8	(2)
1950	Irish League XI	1	(0)

Managerial career
- 1962–1975: Celtic (Asst. Manager)
- 1975: Celtic (Acting Manager)
- 1980–1981: Dumbarton
- * Club domestic league appearances and goals

Sean Fallon
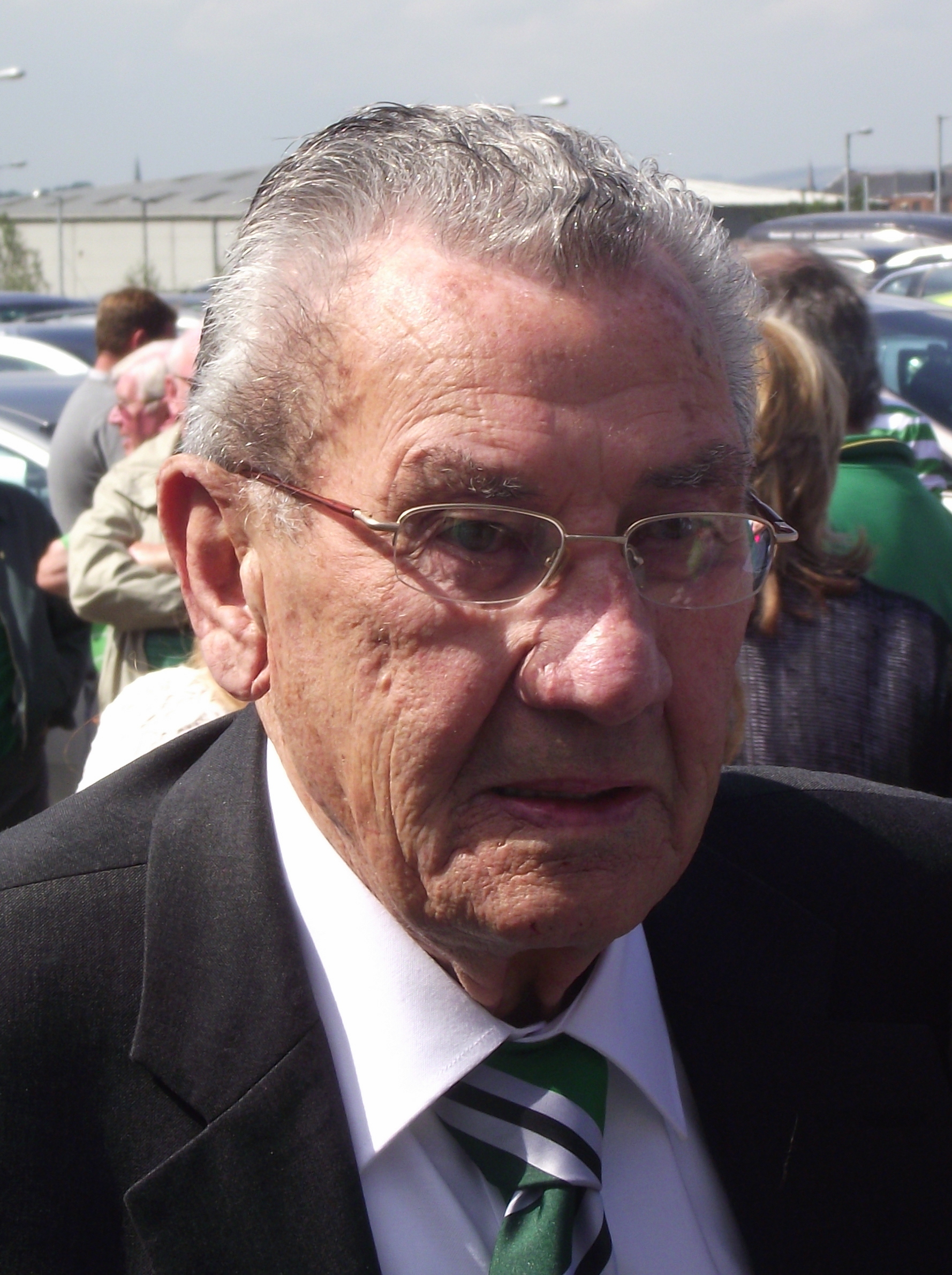

Sport
- Sport: Gaelic football
- Position: Full-Back
Club
- Years: Club
- ? – ?: Craobh Rua
Inter-county
- Years: County
- 1946–1948: Sligo

Sean Fallon (31 July 1922 – 18 January 2013) was an Irish professional footballer. At his death, he was the oldest surviving person to have played for the Republic of Ireland national football team.

== Playing career ==
Sean Fallon played for Celtic from 1950 to 1958, playing as a full-back and centre forward. He made 254 appearances, scoring 14 goals. He also earned eight international caps with the Republic of Ireland.

Sean Fallon started his football career with St Mary's Juniors and also played Gaelic football for Craobh Ruadh. In April 1948, Fallon scored two goals for the Sligo county team against Kerry in a National Football League quarter final played at the Showgrounds.

He also played for McArthurs, Sligo Distillery and Longford Town. While at Longford he was capped at centre half for the junior Republic of Ireland national football team. He joined his hometown club in August 1948 In August 1949 Fallon signed professional forms for Glenavon F.C.

In March 1950 Fallon joined Glasgow Celtic after impressing with his performance for the Irish League XI against the League of Ireland XI

Sean Fallon's love affair with Celtic started when the son of the Celtic legend Jimmy McMenemy saved Fallon's sister, Lilly, from drowning at Lough Gill. Fallon invited Joe McMenemy back to his house and the Scot returned the compliment by sending Sean presents of a Celtic shirt and Willy Maley's book "The Story of the Celtic". He realised his ambition when he made his league debut for Celtic, away to Clyde, in the last game of the 1949–50 season.

Within a year he had helped the team win the Scottish Cup, beating Motherwell 1–0 in the 1951 Scottish Cup Final. Fallon said later: "As I walked off Hampden Park I felt I had got everything out of life I had ever wanted. I had become a member of the famous Celtic Football Club and holder of a Scottish Cup badge all in one year."

Two years later Fallon would also have a cup final goal to celebrate as he scored in the 1953 Scottish Cup Final, against Aberdeen. Fallon's performances for Celtic earned him the nickname: "The Iron Man". He once assessed his own talents as a player by saying – "I was just an ordinary player with a big heart and a fighting spirit to recommend me."

The later 1950s were a barren period for Celtic, with two major triumphs providing rare moments of joy for the long-suffering support. The first was the Double of 1953–54. Fallon suffered a broken collarbone against Hearts in October, which kept him out for most of the season. In the days before substitutes were allowed he left the pitch for twenty minutes only to return with his arm in a sling and continued playing. The captaincy of the side, which had passed to him in 1952, was taken over by Jock Stein. Fallon was back to full fitness for another momentous occasion, when Celtic won 7–1 against Old Firm rivals Rangers in the 1957 Scottish League Cup Final. The match has since become known as Hampden in the sun, a rhyme of the scoreline.

== Coaching career ==
Fallon was forced to retire in 1958 through injury but his influence and importance at the club continued. He became assistant to Jock Stein when Stein took up the post of manager in 1965. It was initially proposed by the Celtic chairman Bob Kelly that Fallon should be manager, and Stein his assistant. However Stein vetoed this suggestion and threatened to take an offered job in England, leading to Kelly offering him the full manager's job.

He was an integral part of Celtic's success under Jock Stein, when he was the manager's right-hand man. His powers of persuasion were often called upon to secure the signatures of promising youngsters who would go on to become important Celtic players, such as David Hay, Danny McGrain, Kenny Dalglish and Packie Bonner. When Jock Stein suffered a near-fatal car crash in 1975, Fallon took over as caretaker manager. He later briefly managed Dumbarton.

Fallon in later years became a director at Dumbarton and then Clyde.

Fallon unfurled the league championship flag at Celtic Park on 4 August 2012. He died on 18 January 2013 at the age of 90.
