= 1957 Scottish League Cup final =

- The 1957 Scottish League Cup final match programme
- Event: 1957–58 Scottish League Cup
Celtic	Rangers
7	1
- Date: 19 October 1957
- Venue: Hampden Park, Glasgow
- Referee: Jack Mowat
- Attendance: 82,293

The 1957 Scottish League Cup final was the final match of the 1957–58 Scottish League Cup. The football match was played on 19 October 1957 at Hampden Park, in which Celtic beat rivals Rangers in a record 7–1 victory. The final was nicknamed "Hampden in the Sun", a phrase coined by Celtic supporters as the title of a terrace song. It has since been used in other songs, poems and a book about the game.

The 7–1 scoreline remains a record for a major domestic cup final in British football.

== Overview ==
Celtic entered the final as holders, having beaten Partick Thistle after a replay in the previous year's final. Rangers were the reigning league champions. The match was the 12th League Cup final, and the first contested by the Old Firm. It was held at a sunny Hampden Park in Glasgow, at 2.45pm on the afternoon of 19 October 1957.

Celtic attacked from the start, with shots hitting the post twice in the first twenty minutes. The first goal was scored by Sammy Wilson, from a Charlie Tully cross on in the 22nd minute. Rangers defended for the remainder of the first half, however in the 44th minute Neil Mochan scored a solo goal after a run down the left wing. Within eight minutes of the restart Billy McPhail scored Celtic's third goal with a header from a Bobby Collins cross. Rangers narrowed the margin five minutes later, a goal by Simpson, however it only served to reinvigorate the Celtic attack as McPhail, then Mochan scored their second goals.

In the 80th minute, McPhail claimed his third, a hat-trick of goals all scored with his head. As the game drew to a close violence flared in among the fans, but in the final minute McPhail was fouled in the Rangers' penalty area. He declined the opportunity to score a fourth goal, a feat never achieved by a player in an Old Firm match, instead Willie Fernie took the kick. In addition to the seven goals, Celtic hit the woodwork four times. They were permitted to keep their jerseys as a souvenir of the day.

Much of the blame for the poor defensive display by Rangers was attributed to centre back John Valentine, who had signed from Queen's Park earlier that season. Bobby Collins told The Sunday Post "I don't know if Valentine had no faith in George Niven or Niven had no faith in Valentine, but ultimately they had no faith in themselves, something you can sense very quickly on a football field, and inevitably the game became a rout."

The victory, reported in The Times as "a wonderful exhibition of football", and as an "October Revolution" by The Sunday Post, was comprehensive. The scoreline remains a record in any major British football final, the record margin of victory in an official Old Firm game, and Rangers' record final defeat.

== Match details ==
19 October 1957

Celtic	7–1	Rangers
Wilson 22'; Mochan 44', 75'; McPhail 53', 67', 80'; Fernie 90' (pen.)	Report	Simpson 58'

Hampden Park, Glasgow
Attendance: 82,293
Referee: Jack Mowat

=== Teams ===
CELTIC :
GK	1	Dick Beattie
FB	2	John Donnelly
FB	4	Sean Fallon
RH	5	Willie Fernie
CH	3	Bobby Evans
LH	7	Bertie Peacock (c)
RW	6	Charlie Tully
IF	8	Bobby Collins
CF	11	Billy McPhail
IF	9	Sammy Wilson
LW	10	Neil Mochan
Manager:
Jimmy McGrory

RANGERS :
GK	1	George Niven
FB	2	Bobby Shearer (c)
FB	4	Eric Caldow
RH	5	Ian McColl
CH	3	John Valentine
LH	7	Harold Davis
RW	8	Alex Scott
IF	9	Billy Simpson
CF	10	Max Murray
IF	6	Sammy Baird
LW	11	Johnny Hubbard
Manager:
Scot Symon

== In song ==
In the summer of 1957, the motion picture Island in the Sun was released in Europe, featuring a title song by Harry Belafonte. The song peaked in the UK Singles Chart in June and went on to become the 5th biggest selling single that year Celtic fans composed alternative lyrics to the tune, and began to sing Hampden in the Sun at football matches to celebrate the victory. The song has since been recorded by artists such as Freedom's sons and regularly features on albums of Celtic football song. The phrase itself has become synonymous with the match, and has since been used in other songs and poems, and is the title of a book about the 1957 final and the iconic status it achieved among the Celtic support.

== See also ==
- 1957–58 Scottish League Cup
