= Willie Fernie (footballer) =

Scottish footballer (1928–2011)

Personal information
- Full name: William Fernie
- Date of birth: 22 November 1928
- Place of birth: Kinglassie, Scotland
- Date of death: 1 July 2011 (aged 82)
- Place of death: Glasgow, Scotland
- Position: Forward

Senior career*
Years	Team	Apps	(Gls)
1948–1958	Celtic	194	(47)
1958–1960	Middlesbrough	65	(3)
1960–1961	Celtic	25	(7)
1961–1963	St Mirren	22	(3)
1963	Partick Thistle	0	(0)
1963	Alloa Athletic	7	(0)
1963–1964	Fraserburgh	6	(1)
1964	Coleraine	3	(0)
1964–1965	Bangor	0	(0)
Total		322	(61)

International career
1953–1958	Scottish League XI	4	(1)
1954–1958	Scotland	12	(1)
1954	Scotland B	1	(0)
1955	Scotland B vs A trial	1	(0)

Managerial career
- 1973–1977: Kilmarnock
- * Club domestic league appearances and goals

William Fernie (22 November 1928 – 1 July 2011) was a Scottish football player and coach. He played as a forward for Celtic, Middlesbrough, St Mirren, Partick Thistle, Alloa Athletic, Fraserburgh, Coleraine and Bangor.

He represented Scotland and the Scottish League, and was selected for Scotland squads in the 1954 and 1958 World Cups. Fernie later managed Kilmarnock between 1973 and 1977.

== Playing career ==
Fernie, who was born in Kinglassie, Fife, joined Celtic from his local side Kinglassie Hearts in 1948. He had to wait until March 1950, however, to make his first team debut. Fernie became a regular first team player in 1952–53, and set up both of the Celtic goals in their 2–0 win against Hibs in the Coronation Cup Final.

A renowned dribbler, he also displayed a remarkable versatility which saw the club deploy him as a right half, inside forward and outside left as the need arose. He was part of Celtic's 1953–54 Double-winning team and also collected two League Cup winners medals, in 1956 and 1957. In the 1957 Scottish League Cup Final, Fernie played in the deeper position of right half, influencing the play and scoring the last Celtic goal as they defeated rivals Rangers 7–1.

Fernie's efforts in Celtic's double-winning side earned him promotion to the full Scotland team, having previously represented the B team and the Scottish League. He made his debut against Finland and was selected in the squad for the 1954 FIFA World Cup. He played in both matches in Switzerland, but Scotland suffered a 7–0 defeat by Uruguay. Despite this infamous loss, Fernie remained part of the national team and in October 1956 he scored his only Scotland goal, against Wales. and was selected for the 1958 World Cup. He played only one match in the tournament, a 3–2 defeat by Paraguay, which proved to be his final appearance for Scotland.

Fernie joined Middlesbrough, where he played in attack alongside Brian Clough, for £18,000 in December 1958. He returned to Celtic Park in October 1960, for a fee of £12,000. He moved to St Mirren for £3,000 in November 1961 and helped them reach the 1962 Scottish Cup Final, although Rangers won 2–0 at Hampden. He finished his career with short spells at Alloa Athletic, Fraserburgh, Coleraine and Bangor before moving into coaching.

== Managerial career ==
Fernie returned to Celtic in 1967, appointed reserve team coach by Jock Stein. He helped to develop young players at the club, including Kenny Dalglish, Danny McGrain and Davie Hay. Fernie was appointed manager of Kilmarnock in October 1973. He led his new charges to a 16 match unbeaten run and promotion in 1974. Kilmarnock fell two points short of the league reconstruction cut-off in 1975, but they gained promotion to the new Scottish Premier Division in 1976. However, as a part-time team, Kilmarnock struggled in the top flight and were unsurprisingly relegated in 1977. After a bad start to the following season, Fernie was sacked in October 1977 and was never again employed in football.

Disillusioned with football, he subsequently worked as a taxi driver. Fernie died in 2011, aged 82, after suffering from Alzheimer's disease.
