= William Cringan =

Scottish footballer

Willie Cringan
Personal information
- Full name: William Cringan
- Date of birth: 21 April 1890
- Place of birth: Muirkirk, Scotland
- Date of death: 12 May 1958 (aged 68)
- Place of death: Bathgate, Scotland
- Position: Centre half

Senior career*
| Years | Team | Apps | (Gls) |
- Douglas Water Thistle
| 1910–1917 | Sunderland | 77 | (2) |
| 1916–1917 | → Ayr United (loan) | 53 | (2) |
| 1917 | Ayr United | 6 | (0) |
| 1917–1923 | Celtic | 203 | (9) |
| 1923–1924 | Third Lanark | 30 | (0) |
| 1924–1925 | Motherwell | 16 | (1) |
| 1925 | Inverness Thistle | 16 | (1) |
| 1925–1926 | Bathgate | | |
| Total | | 399 | (14) |

International career
| 1919–1921 | Scottish Football League XI | 4 | (0) |
| | Scotland (wartime) | 1 | (0) |
| 1920–1923 | Scotland | 5 | (0) |
- * Club domestic league appearances and goals

William Cringan (21 April 1890 – 12 May 1958) was a Scottish footballer who played for Sunderland, Ayr United, Celtic, Third Lanark and Motherwell, and for the Scotland national team.

== Career ==
=== Club ===
Cringan, a centre half, started his senior career when he joined Sunderland from Douglas Water Thistle in 1910. After five and a half seasons on Wearside, and with English football suspended during World War I, he returned to Scotland with Ayr United on a temporary transfer in January 1916. In the summer of 1917 he left the Black Cats to join Ayr on a permanent basis, signing for Celtic in a £600 transfer deal a few months after that.

Cringan was appointed Celtic captain soon after his arrival, a position he held until his departure. During this time the club won the 1918–19 and 1921–22 Scottish League titles and the Scottish Cup in 1923. He eventually left the Parkhead club in October 1923 when he joined Third Lanark. A year later he moved to Motherwell, where he moved away from top-level football following the 1924–25 season, with short spells outside the league with Inverness Thistle and Bathgate before retiring altogether.

=== International ===
Cringan was first selected for the Scottish national side on 26 February 1920, captaining the side in a 1–1 draw against Wales. He was not selected again until 1923 but would eventually win a total of five international caps, three as captain. Cringan also featured in four matches for a Scottish Football League select side.

== Personal life ==
Cringan's brother Jimmy was also a professional footballer, who played for twelve seasons with Birmingham between 1922 and 1934. Another brother Robert played for Ayr United.

Cringan married the sister of footballer Peter Nellies; the brothers-in-law played together once for the Scottish League XI in 1919.

== Honours ==
Sunderland

- Football League champions: 1912–13

Celtic

- Scottish League: 1918–19, 1921–22
- Scottish Cup: 1922–23
- Glasgow Cup: 1919–20, 1920–21

== See also ==
- List of Scotland national football team captains
- List of Scotland wartime international footballers
- List of Scottish football families
