= List of Scottish Football League representative players =

The Scottish Football League XI was a representative side of the Scottish Football League (SFL). Soon after the creation of the SFL in 1890, there was a desire on the part of its officials to test its strength against its older counterpart (English) Football League. A match between the Scottish League and The Football League XI was first played in April 1892 at Pike's Lane, Bolton and ended in a 2–2 draw. The Scottish League also played representative matches against the Irish League XI, League of Ireland XI, a Welsh League XI, a Danish Combination and the Italian league. They had also played four fundraising matches during World War I and six unofficial trial matches against Scotland between 1958 and 1964 – players involved in those matches are recorded separately.

A Scottish League team last played in 1990, to mark the league's centenary, in a match against the Scotland national team. The Scottish Football League ceased to exist in 2013, when it merged with the Scottish Premier League to form the Scottish Professional Football League.

Bobby Evans holds the record for Scottish League XI appearances, having played 25 times between 1948 and 1960. George Young attained 22 caps, and is the only other player to have won at least 20. Seventeen other players achieved at least 10 caps. Willie Bauld scored the most goals for the Scottish League XI, with his 15 goals coming in 13 appearances between 1949 and 1958. Lawrie Reilly scored 14 goals in as many games. As well as being the third highest scorer, Barney Battles, Jr. is also the most prolific, with his 13 goals coming from only five games (averaging 2.6 goals per game). Bobby Collins (12) and William Reid (10) also scored at least 10 goals for the team.

== List of players ==
=== Inter-league matches ===
Of the 155 players who made at least four appearances for the Scottish League team, only eight never played for the full Scotland team, including John Stewart Wright whose career coincided with World War I and played in unofficial internationals, Bob Ferrier who was ineligible during his era due to being born in Sheffield, South African Johnny Hubbard, and goalkeepers Willie White and George Niven, the latter of whom is the Rangers player with most appearances for the club without a full cap, having missed out through injury on several occasions. The other players in that group are John McFarlane, Chic Geatons and Willie Rankin.

Barney Battles Jr. was capped for both Scotland and the United States, Joe Kennaway played for Scotland and Canada, and Patsy Gallacher featured for both Ireland teams.

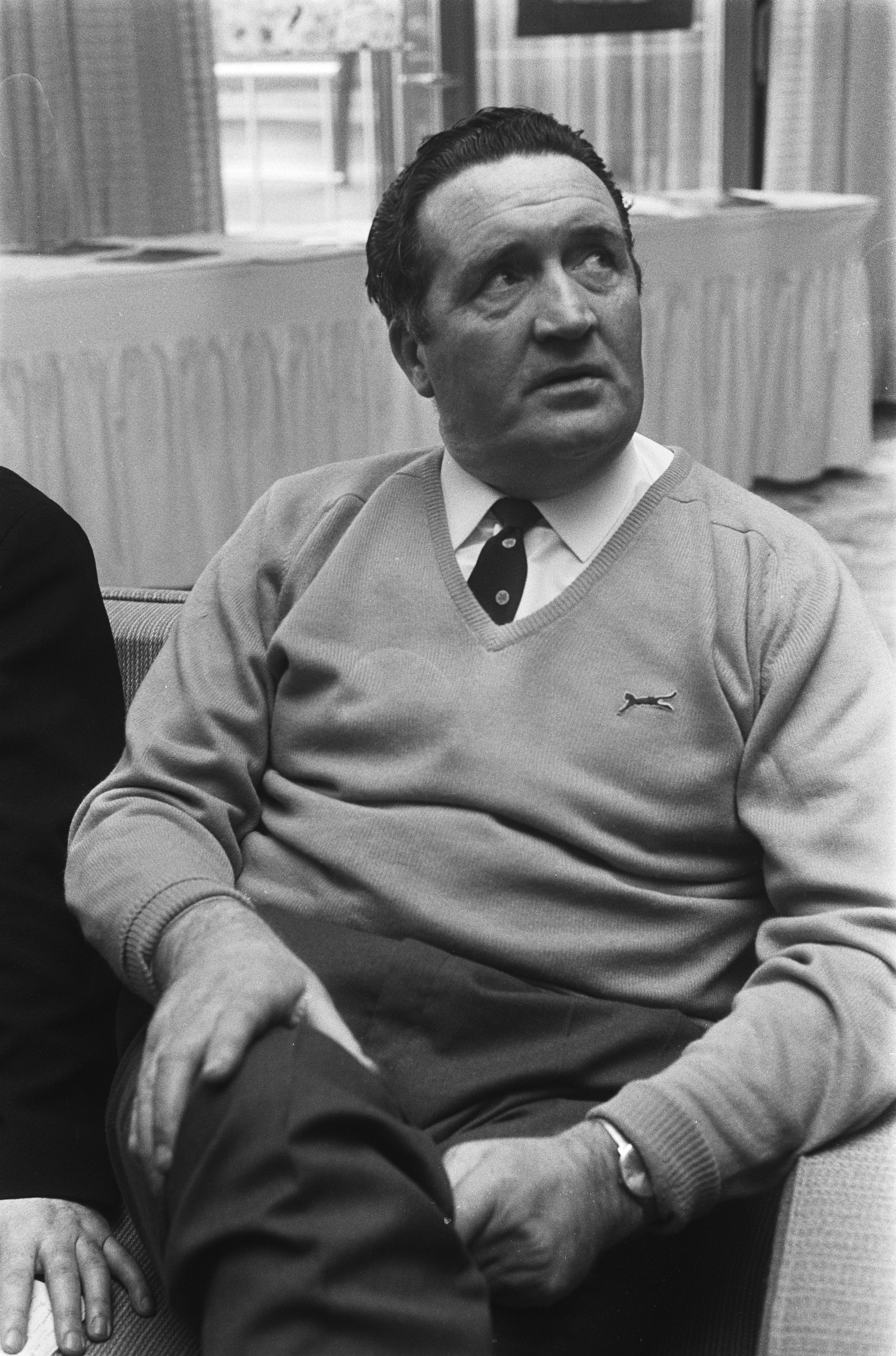
Jock Stein played once for the Scottish League XI, in 1954. Stein and Alex Ferguson both played for the Scottish League XI and became Scotland national football team manager, but neither played for the national team.

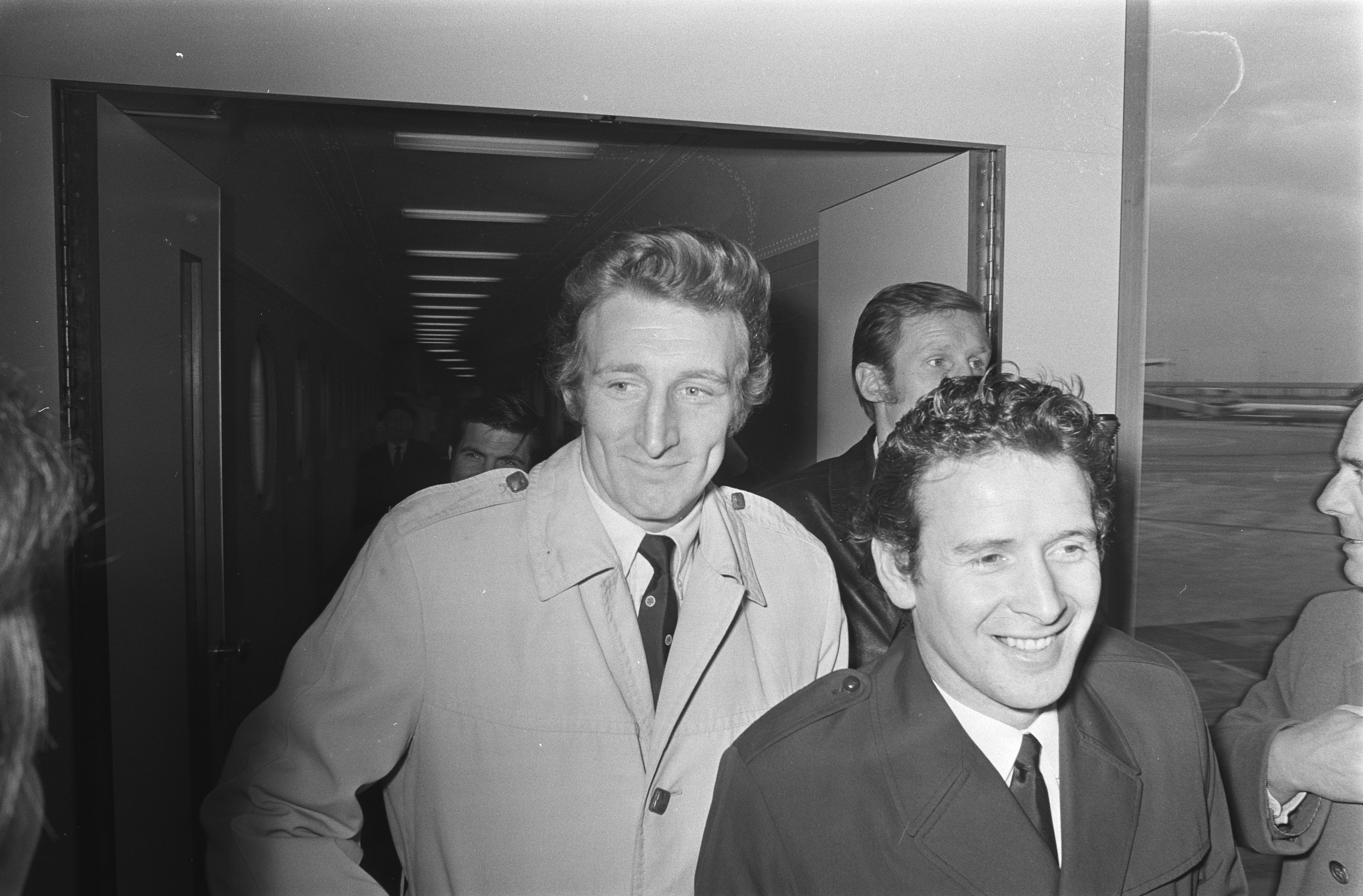
Celtic players Tommy Gemmell (left) and Willie Wallace (right) both played for the Scottish League XI during the 1960s.

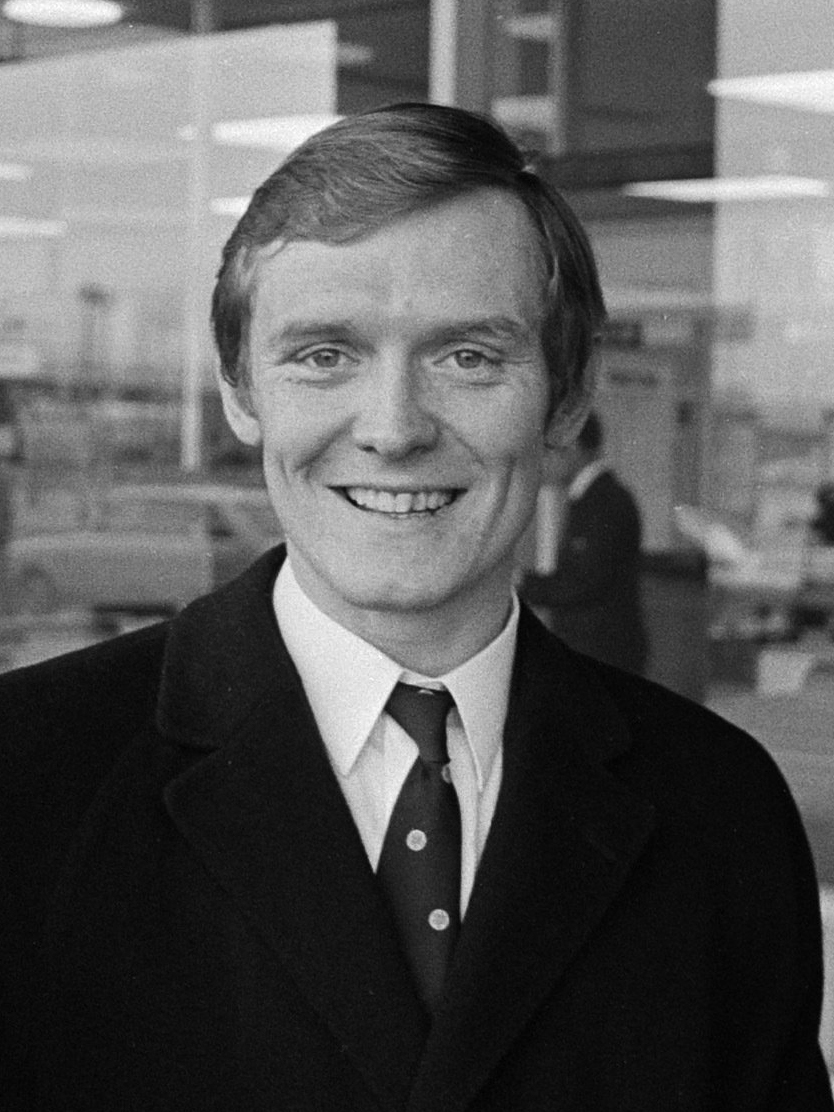
David Hay played four times for the Scottish League XI in the early 1970s.

| Name | First cap | Last cap | Caps | Goals | Club(s) when capped |
|---|---|---|---|---|---|
| Bobby Evans | 1948 | 1960 | 25 | 0 | Celtic |
| George Young | 1947 | 1956 | 22 | 2 | Rangers |
| Bobby Collins | 1951 | 1958 | 16 | 12 | Celtic |
| Alec McNair | 1908 | 1920 | 15 (Note: One more cap should be attributed to Jimmy McMenemy and one fewer to Alec McNair than listed at London Hearts due to an error in a 1908 match summary whereby McNair was counted twice, in place of McMenemy whom contemporary sources confirm did play.) | 0 | Celtic |
| Jimmy Gordon | 1909 | 1920 | 14 (Note: One more cap should be attributed to William Walker and one fewer to Jimmy Gordon than listed at London Hearts due to an error in a 1912 match summary whereby Gordon was counted twice, in place of Walker whom contemporary sources confirm did play.) | 2 | Rangers |
| Alan Morton | 1919 | 1931 | 15 | 1 | Queen's Park; Rangers |
| Jimmy Brownlie | 1909 | 1919 | 14 | 0 | Third Lanark |
| Eric Caldow | 1957 | 1965 | 14 | 1 | Rangers |
| John Greig | 1963 | 1976 | 14 (Note: Includes one appearance as a substitute in 1976, not recorded at London Hearts.) | 1 | Rangers |
| Jimmy McMenemy | 1908 | 1920 | 14 | 2 | Celtic |
| Lawrie Reilly | 1948 | 1956 | 14 | 14 | Hibernian |
| Alex Smith | 1897 | 1913 | 14 | 2 | Rangers |
| Bobby Walker | 1899 | 1911 | 14 | 4 | Heart of Midlothian |
| Willie Bauld | 1949 | 1958 | 13 | 15 | Heart of Midlothian |
| Sammy Cox | 1948 | 1953 | 13 | 0 | Rangers |
| Sandy Archibald | 1919 | 1933 | 12 | 1 | Rangers |
| Jerry Dawson | 1931 | 1941 | 11 | 0 | Rangers |
| Neilly Gibson | 1895 | 1903 | 11 | 0 | Rangers |
| Gordon Smith | 1948 | 1955 | 11 | 3 | Hibernian |
| Alex Bennett | 1905 | 1912 | 10 | 0 | Celtic; Rangers |
| Andy Cunningham | 1912 | 1928 | 10 | 1 | Kilmarnock; Rangers |
| Dan Doyle | 1892 | 1899 | 10 (Note: Includes one fixture not recorded at 'London Hearts' between the SFL and the Scottish Football Alliance in 1892.) | 0 | Celtic |
| Willie McStay | 1919 | 1928 | 10 | 0 | Celtic |
| Willie Ormond | 1947 | 1958 | 10 | 3 | Hibernian |
| George Stevenson | 1927 | 1934 | 10 | 2 | Motherwell |
| Ronnie McKinnon | 1966 | 1971 | 9 | 0 | Rangers |
| Sandy McMahon | 1892 | 1900 | 9 | 4 | Celtic |
| Billy McNeill | 1961 | 1967 | 9 | 0 | Celtic |
| Peter Nellies | 1911 | 1919 | 9 | 1 | Heart of Midlothian |
| Alex Parker | 1955 | 1958 | 9 | 0 | Falkirk |
| Nicol Smith | 1897 | 1904 | 9 | 1 | Rangers |
| Jimmy Wardhaugh | 1951 | 1956 | 9 | 8 | Heart of Midlothian |
| Bill Brown | 1956 | 1958 | 8 | 0 | Dundee |
| Bobby Brown | 1949 | 1952 | 8 | 0 | Rangers |
| Joe Dodds (Scottish footballer) | 1912 | 1920 | 8 | 2 | Celtic |
| Alex Hamilton | 1961 | 1965 | 8 | 1 | Dundee |
| Jimmy Quinn | 1904 | 1912 | 8 | 7 | Celtic |
| Willie Reid | 1910 | 1915 | 8 | 10 | Rangers |
| Tommy Ring | 1953 | 1957 | 8 | 4 | Clyde |
| Paddy Crerand | 1960 | 1962 | 7 | 1 | Celtic |
| John Cumming | 1955 | 1960 | 7 | 1 | Heart of Midlothian |
| Bob Ferrier | 1922 | 1930 | 7 | 5 | Motherwell |
| Archie Glen | 1954 | 1958 | 7 | 1 | Aberdeen |
| Harry Haddock | 1954 | 1956 | 7 | 1 | Clyde |
| Robert Hamilton | 1898 | 1904 | 7 | 9 | Rangers |
| James Kelly | 1893 | 1897 | 7 | 0 | Celtic |
| Jimmy Mason | 1948 | 1950 | 7 | 0 | Third Lanark |
| Andrew McAtee | 1912 | 1920 | 7 | 1 | Celtic |
| Ian McColl | 1952 | 1958 | 7 | 3 | Rangers |
| Tommy McLean | 1966 | 1973 | 7 | 0 | Kilmarnock; Rangers |
| Willie Miller | 1947 | 1948 | 7 | 0 | Celtic |
| George Niven | 1953 | 1960 | 7 | 0 | Rangers |
| Willie Redpath | 1948 | 1950 | 7 | 1 | Motherwell |
| Harry Rennie | 1900 | 1908 | 7 | 0 | Heart of Midlothian; Hibernian |
| Alex Scott | 1956 | 1962 | 7 | 2 | Rangers |
| Davie Wilson | 1960 | 1964 | 7 | 3 | Rangers |
| Willie Woodburn | 1947 | 1951 | 7 | 0 | Rangers |
| James Blessington | 1892 | 1898 | 6 | 1 | Celtic |
| Tommy Cairns | 1922 | 1926 | 6 | 0 | Rangers |
| Peter Cormack | 1966 | 1970 | 6 | 3 | Hibernian |
| Jimmy Delaney | 1936 | 1939 | 6 | 3 | Celtic |
| John Grant | 1958 | 1961 | 6 | 0 | Hibernian |
| Dougie Gray | 1927 | 1930 | 6 | 0 | Rangers |
| Jimmy Hay | 1909 | 1911 | 6 | 0 | Celtic |
| Willie Henderson | 1962 | 1968 | 6 | 2 | Rangers |
| Bobby Hogg | 1934 | 1939 | 6 | 0 | Celtic |
| John Hughes | 1961 | 1968 | 6 | 4 | Celtic |
| Bobby Johnstone | 1951 | 1954 | 6 | 1 | Hibernian |
| Alex Massie | 1932 | 1935 | 6 | 1 | Heart of Midlothian |
| Jimmy McGrory | 1926 | 1935 | 6 | 6 | Celtic |
| Willie McNaught | 1950 | 1957 | 6 | 0 | Raith Rovers |
| Bob McPhail | 1926 | 1936 | 6 | 5 | Airdrieonians; Rangers |
| David Meiklejohn | 1921 | 1932 | 6 | 0 | Rangers |
| Tommy Muirhead | 1921 | 1929 | 6 | 1 | Rangers |
| Andy Penman | 1960 | 1967 | 6 | 3 | Dundee; Rangers |
| Pat Quinn | 1959 | 1962 | 6 | 1 | Motherwell |
| John Tait Robertson | 1900 | 1905 | 6 | 1 | Rangers |
| Pat Stanton | 1966 | 1973 | 6 | 0 | Hibernian |
| Jack Taylor | 1892 | 1895 | 6 | 4 | Dumbarton; St Mirren |
| James Young | 1904 | 1911 | 6 | 0 | Celtic |
| Sammy Baird | 1954 | 1958 | 5 | 1 | Rangers |
| Barney Battles, Jr. | 1928 | 1930 | 5 | 13 | Heart of Midlothian |
| Jim Baxter | 1961 | 1964 | 5 | 0 | Rangers |
| James Bowie | 1911 | 1919 | 5 | 2 | Rangers |
| Ralph Brand | 1961 | 1963 | 5 | 8 | Rangers |
| George Brown | 1931 | 1936 | 5 | 0 | Rangers |
| Jimmy Carabine | 1937 | 1939 | 5 | 0 | Third Lanark |
| Tully Craig | 1925 | 1929 | 5 | 1 | Rangers |
| Jimmy Crapnell | 1929 | 1932 | 5 | 0 | Airdrieonians |
| Chic Geatons | 1932 | 1938 | 5 | 0 | Celtic |
| Tommy Gemmell | 1965 | 1968 | 5 | 0 | Celtic |
| Graham Leggat | 1954 | 1958 | 5 | 6 | Aberdeen |
| Bert McCann | 1959 | 1961 | 5 | 1 | Motherwell |
| Peter McGonagle | 1930 | 1934 | 5 | 1 | Celtic |
| Colin McNab | 1927 | 1930 | 5 | 0 | Dundee |
| John McPherson | 1897 | 1902 | 5 | 2 | Rangers |
| Bob Mercer | 1912 | 1913 | 5 | 1 | Heart of Midlothian |
| Bobby Murdoch | 1965 | 1969 | 5 | 0 | Celtic |
| James Reid | 1912 | 1919 | 5 | 6 | Airdrieonians |
| Harry Ritchie | 1921 | 1927 | 5 | 0 | Hibernian |
| Charles Bellany Thomson | 1904 | 1908 | 5 | 2 | Heart of Midlothian |
| Willie Toner | 1958 | 1960 | 5 | 0 | Kilmarnock |
| Alex Venters | 1935 | 1939 | 5 | 1 | Rangers |
| Willie Waddell | 1947 | 1951 | 5 | 1 | Rangers |
| John Walker | 1896 | 1904 | 5 | 0 | Heart of Midlothian; Rangers |
| Tommy Walker | 1935 | 1939 | 5 | 2 | Heart of Midlothian |
| Andrew Anderson | 1934 | 1936 | 4 | 0 | Heart of Midlothian |
| Bernard Breslin | 1898 | 1900 | 4 | 1 | Hibernian |
| Willie Callaghan | 1968 | 1970 | 4 | 0 | Dunfermline Athletic |
| John Campbell | 1893 | 1902 | 4 (Note: One more cap should be attributed to Bobby Neill and one fewer to Johnny Campbell than listed at London Hearts due to an error in a 1901 match summary whereby Campbell was counted twice, in place of Neill whom contemporary sources confirm did play.) | 3 | Celtic |
| Stevie Chalmers | 1962 | 1967 | 4 | 0 | Celtic |
| Eddie Connachan | 1961 | 1962 | 4 | 0 | Dunfermline Athletic |
| George Connelly | 1970 | 1973 | 4 | 1 | Celtic |
| Charlie Cooke | 1962 | 1965 | 4 | 3 | Aberdeen; Dundee |
| William Cringan | 1919 | 1921 | 4 | 0 | Celtic |
| Jimmy Davidson | 1952 | 1954 | 4 | 0 | Partick Thistle |
| Arthur Duncan | 1967 | 1976 | 4 | 0 | Partick Thistle; Hibernian |
| Willie Fernie | 1953 | 1958 | 4 | 1 | Celtic |
| David Hay | 1970 | 1973 | 4 | 0 | Celtic |
| Billy Houliston | 1948 | 1949 | 4 | 3 | Queen of the South |
| Johnny Hubbard | 1955 | 1955 | 4 | 2 | Rangers |
| Willie Hunter | 1958 | 1961 | 4 | 0 | Motherwell |
| Jock Hutton | 1923 | 1925 | 4 | 0 | Aberdeen |
| John Jackson | 1929 | 1932 | 4 | 0 | Partick Thistle |
| Jimmy Johnstone | 1964 | 1970 | 4 | 0 | Celtic |
| Joe Kennaway | 1932 | 1934 | 4 | 0 | Celtic |
| Jim Kennedy | 1961 | 1964 | 4 | 0 | Celtic |
| Alexander King | 1896 | 1898 | 4 | 2 | Heart of Midlothian; Celtic |
| Jake Madden | 1893 | 1896 | 4 | 2 | Celtic |
| Harry Marshall | 1898 | 1900 | 4 | 0 | Heart of Midlothian; Celtic |
| Daniel McArthur | 1895 | 1899 | 4 | 0 | Celtic |
| Joe McBride | 1964 | 1966 | 4 | 8 | Motherwell; Celtic |
| Peter McCloy | 1966 | 1973 | 4 | 0 | Motherwell; Rangers |
| John McFarlane | 1924 | 1928 | 4 | 0 | Celtic |
| Jimmy McMullan | 1919 | 1921 | 4 | 0 | Partick Thistle |
| Jimmy Millar | 1961 | 1964 | 4 | 3 | Rangers |
| Jackie Neilson | 1951 | 1954 | 4 | 0 | St Mirren |
| Willie Rankin | 1919 | 1923 | 4 | 1 | Motherwell |
| Jimmy Simpson | 1934 | 1935 | 4 | 1 | Rangers |
| Dave Smith | 1966 | 1970 | 4 | 0 | Aberdeen; Rangers |
| Ian St. John | 1959 | 1961 | 4 | 6 | Motherwell |
| Billy Steel | 1947 | 1952 | 4 | 2 | Morton; Dundee |
| Willie Telfer | 1951 | 1955 | 4 | 0 | St Mirren |
| Alec Thomson | 1925 | 1930 | 4 | 0 | Celtic |
| John Thomson | 1928 | 1930 | 4 | 0 | Celtic |
| Tom Townsley | 1923 | 1925 | 4 | 0 | Falkirk |
| Eddie Turnbull | 1949 | 1958 | 4 | 0 | Hibernian |
| Ian Ure | 1961 | 1962 | 4 | 0 | Dundee |
| Willie Wallace | 1965 | 1969 | 4 | 3 | Heart of Midlothian; Celtic |
| Jock White | 1923 | 1926 | 4 | 5 | Heart of Midlothian |
| Willie White | 1923 | 1926 | 4 | 0 | Heart of Midlothian |
| Peter Wilson | 1926 | 1933 | 4 | 0 | Celtic |
| John Stewart Wright | 1913 | 1919 | 4 | 0 | Morton |
| Tommy Younger | 1955 | 1955 | 4 | 0 | Hibernian |
| Johnny Aitkenhead | 1951 | 1952 | 3 | 3 | Motherwell |
| Matt Armstrong | 1935 | 1936 | 3 | 1 | Aberdeen |
| Joe Baillie | 1951 | 1952 | 3 | 0 | Celtic |
| Isaac Begbie | 1893 | 1894 | 3 | 0 | Heart of Midlothian |
| Bertie Black | 1958 | 1961 | 3 | 0 | Kilmarnock |
| Danny Blair | 1927 | 1928 | 3 | 0 | Clyde |
| Jimmy Blair | 1911 | 1912 | 3 | 0 | Clyde |
| Billy Boyd | 1931 | 1933 | 3 | 3 | Clyde |
| Jock Cameron | 1903 | 1904 | 3 | 0 | St Mirren |
| Jimmy Caskie | 1937 | 1941 | 3 | 0 | St Johnstone; Hibernian (Note: Was on wartime guest loan, never played for club in official SFL match.) |
| Joe Cassidy | 1921 | 1923 | 3 | 1 | Celtic |
| Bobby Combe | 1948 | 1954 | 3 | 0 | Hibernian |
| Alfie Conn, Sr. | 1948 | 1955 | 3 | 2 | Heart of Midlothian |
| Jimmy Cowan | 1949 | 1953 | 3 | 0 | Morton |
| Doug Cowie | 1953 | 1956 | 3 | 0 | Dundee |
| James Crawford | 1931 | 1935 | 3 | 1 | Queen's Park |
| Jimmy Croal | 1913 | 1914 | 3 | 3 | Falkirk |
| Jim Cruickshank | 1964 | 1970 | 3 | 0 | Heart of Midlothian |
| Johnny Deakin | 1948 | 1949 | 3 | 3 | St Mirren |
| Billy Dickson | 1970 | 1971 | 3 | 0 | Kilmarnock |
| John Divers | 1962 | 1963 | 3 | 4 | Celtic |
| Bobby Dougan | 1950 | 1953 | 3 | 0 | Heart of Midlothian |
| Jock Drummond | 1895 | 1901 | 3 | 0 | Rangers |
| Jimmy Dykes | 1937 | 1939 | 3 | 0 | Heart of Midlothian |
| Hughie Ferguson | 1920 | 1922 | 3 | 3 | Motherwell |
| Thomas Ferguson | 1921 | 1927 | 3 | 0 | Falkirk |
| Donald Ford | 1971 | 1974 | 3 | 0 | Heart of Midlothian |
| George French | 1921 | 1922 | 3 | 1 | Morton |
| Torrance Gillick | 1947 | 1948 | 3 | 1 | Rangers |
| Alan Gilzean | 1960 | 1964 | 3 | 1 | Dundee |
| George Hamilton | 1947 | 1951 | 3 | 2 | Aberdeen; Heart of Midlothian |
| Bill Harper | 1922 | 1925 | 3 | 0 | Hibernian |
| Mike Haughney | 1954 | 1954 | 3 | 0 | Celtic |
| George Herd | 1960 | 1960 | 3 | 3 | Clyde |
| Tom Jackson | 1902 | 1905 | 3 | 0 | St Mirren |
| John Johnston | 1928 | 1932 | 3 | 0 | Heart of Midlothian |
| Willie Kivlichan | 1909 | 1910 | 3 | 0 | Celtic |
| Davie Laing | 1952 | 1952 | 3 | 0 | Heart of Midlothian |
| Bobby Lennox | 1966 | 1968 | 3 | 2 | Celtic |
| Lawrie Leslie | 1960 | 1961 | 3 | 0 | Airdrieonians |
| Willie Loney | 1909 | 1910 | 3 | 0 | Celtic |
| Sandy MacFarlane | 1904 | 1911 | 3 | 1 | Dundee |
| Dave Mackay | 1957 | 1958 | 3 | 0 | Heart of Midlothian |
| Bobby Main | 1934 | 1935 | 3 | 0 | Rangers |
| Fred Martin | 1952 | 1954 | 3 | 0 | Aberdeen |
| John May | 1906 | 1908 | 3 | 0 | Rangers |
| Willie McAndrew | 1911 | 1912 | 3 | 0 | Clyde |
| Adam McLean | 1923 | 1928 | 3 | 0 | Celtic |
| John McMenemy | 1931 | 1933 | 3 | 0 | Motherwell |
| Bob McNeil | 1912 | 1913 | 3 | 0 | Hamilton Academical |
| Davie McParland | 1962 | 1964 | 3 | 0 | Partick Thistle |
| Alex McSpadyen | 1938 | 1941 | 3 | 1 | Partick Thistle |
| Jimmy McStay | 1926 | 1931 | 3 | 0 | Celtic |
| Jimmy Millar | 1897 | 1898 | 3 | 0 | Rangers |
| George Mulhall | 1959 | 1961 | 3 | 0 | Aberdeen |
| Jimmy Oswald | 1894 | 1896 | 3 (Note: One more cap should be attributed to James Oswald and one fewer to Jimmy Oswald than listed at London Hearts due to an error in a 1900 match summary; contemporary sources confirm the player involved was the Leith Athletic goalkeeper.) | 3 | St Bernard's |
| Alex Raisbeck | 1897 | 1912 | 3 | 0 | Hibernian; Partick Thistle |
| Davie Robb | 1969 | 1974 | 3 | 1 | Aberdeen |
| Charlie Shaw | 1914 | 1920 | 3 | 0 | Celtic |
| Davie Shaw | 1948 | 1948 | 3 | 0 | Hibernian |
| Jimmy Smith | 1924 | 1927 | 3 | 2 | Heart of Midlothian |
| William Smith | 1911 | 1914 | 3 | 0 | Hibernian |
| Peter Somers | 1899 | 1909 | 3 | 0 | Celtic |
| Doug Somner | 1978 | 1980 | 3 | 2 | Partick Thistle; St Mirren |
| Colin Stein | 1968 | 1972 | 3 | 1 | Rangers |
| Jim Stewart | 1974 | 1978 | 3 | 0 | Kilmarnock |
| Bobby Templeton | 1909 | 1910 | 3 | 1 | Kilmarnock |
| James Adams | 1893 | 1894 | 2 | 0 | Heart of Midlothian |
| William Agnew | 1907 | 1908 | 2 | 0 | Kilmarnock |
| Charlie Aitken | 1958 | 1958 | 2 | 0 | Motherwell |
| Henry Allan | 1899 | 1900 | 2 | 0 | Heart of Midlothian |
| George Anderson | 1901 | 1902 | 2 | 0 | Kilmarnock |
| Bertie Auld | 1958 | 1965 | 2 | 0 | Celtic |
| Davie Baird | 1893 | 1894 | 2 | 1 | Heart of Midlothian |
| John Barker | 1894 | 1895 | 2 | 0 | Rangers |
| Barney Battles, Sr. | 1899 | 1902 | 2 | 0 | Celtic |
| Jack Bell | 1892 | 1899 | 2 | 1 | Dumbarton; Celtic |
| Andy Black | 1937 | 1938 | 2 | 3 | Heart of Midlothian |
| James S. Blair | 1939 | 1939 | 2 | 0 | Third Lanark |
| John Blair | 1934 | 1936 | 2 | 0 | Motherwell |
| Jim Brogan | 1969 | 1971 | 2 | 0 | Celtic |
| Hugh Brown | 1947 | 1948 | 2 | 0 | Partick Thistle |
| John Browning | 1914 | 1914 | 2 | 0 | Celtic |
| Walter Bruce | 1902 | 1903 | 2 | 0 | St Mirren |
| Willie Buchan | 1935 | 1937 | 2 | 3 | Celtic |
| Paddy Buckley | 1954 | 1955 | 2 | 0 | Aberdeen |
| Albert Buick | 1899 | 1903 | 2 | 0 | Heart of Midlothian |
| Willie Bulloch | 1911 | 1914 | 2 | 0 | Partick Thistle |
| Patrick Callaghan | 1900 | 1903 | 2 | 0 | Hibernian |
| Tommy Callaghan | 1968 | 1971 | 2 | 0 | Dunfermline Athletic; Celtic |
| John Clark | 1966 | 1967 | 2 | 0 | Celtic |
| Paul Clarke | 1978 | 1980 | 2 | 0 | Kilmarnock |
| Tom Collins | 1909 | 1910 | 2 | 0 | Heart of Midlothian |
| Donald Colman | 1910 | 1911 | 2 | 0 | Aberdeen |
| Willie Cook | 1926 | 1927 | 2 | 0 | Dundee |
| Willie Cooper | 1934 | 1935 | 2 | 0 | Aberdeen |
| Alan Cousin | 1958 | 1958 | 2 | 1 | Dundee |
| Allan Craig | 1929 | 1930 | 2 | 0 | Motherwell |
| George Cummings | 1934 | 1935 | 2 | 0 | Partick Thistle |
| Neil Dewar | 1932 | 1939 | 2 | 2 | Third Lanark |
| Ally Donaldson | 1965 | 1969 | 2 | 0 | Dundee |
| Jock Ewart | 1910 | 1911 | 2 | 0 | Airdrieonians |
| Alex Ferguson | 1967 | 1967 | 2 | 1 | Dunfermline Athletic; Rangers |
| Bobby Ferguson | 1966 | 1967 | 2 | 0 | Kilmarnock |
| Bobby Flavell | 1947 | 1947 | 2 | 6 | Airdrieonians |
| Campbell Forsyth | 1964 | 1965 | 2 | 0 | Kilmarnock |
| Tom Forsyth | 1971 | 1976 | 2 | 0 | Rangers |
| Stewart Fraser | 1962 | 1962 | 2 | 3 | Dundee United |
| Hughie Gallacher | 1925 | 1925 | 2 | 6 | Airdrieonians |
| Patsy Gallacher | 1913 | 1924 | 2 | 0 | Celtic |
| Jimmy Galt | 1911 | 1912 | 2 | 0 | Rangers |
| Jimmy Gibson | 1925 | 1927 | 2 | 0 | Partick Thistle |
| John Gilchrist | 1921 | 1922 | 2 | 0 | Celtic |
| Robert Glen | 1900 | 1900 | 2 | 0 | Hibernian |
| Jimmy Gourlay | 1914 | 1919 | 2 | 1 | Morton |
| Jock Govan | 1948 | 1952 | 2 | 0 | Hibernian |
| Johnny Graham | 1970 | 1970 | 2 | 1 | Hibernian |
| Willie Hamilton | 1962 | 1965 | 2 | 0 | Heart of Midlothian; Hibernian |
| Robert Harrison | 1935 | 1936 | 2 | 0 | Hamilton Academical |
| Jim Herriot | 1962 | 1963 | 2 | 0 | Dunfermline Athletic |
| Willie Hewitt | 1947 | 1950 | 2 | 0 | Partick Thistle |
| Johnny Hodge | 1900 | 1900 | 2 | 2 | Celtic |
| James Hunter | 1923 | 1923 | 2 | 0 | Falkirk |
| Sandy Jardine | 1972 | 1973 | 2 | 0 | Rangers |
| Willie Johnston | 1969 | 1970 | 2 | 1 | Rangers |
| Derek Johnstone | 1973 | 1974 | 2 | 0 | Rangers |
| Andy Kerr | 1955 | 1957 | 2 | 0 | Partick Thistle |
| Peter Kerr | 1923 | 1926 | 2 | 0 | Hibernian; Heart of Midlothian |
| David Kinnear | 1936 | 1938 | 2 | 0 | Rangers |
| Archie Kyle | 1906 | 1908 | 2 | 1 | Rangers |
| Robert Rae Laing | 1892 | 1893 | 2 | 1 | Leith Athletic |
| David Lapsley | 1951 | 1954 | 2 | 1 | St Mirren |
| John Little | 1954 | 1960 | 2 | 0 | Rangers |
| Alec Logan | 1907 | 1910 | 2 (Note: Several sources attribute a 1907 Scottish League appearance to Tommy Logan, but this is extremely unlikely as he was a teenager with no top level experience at the time of the fixture in question; by contrast, his elder brother Alec Logan was an established forward at Falkirk and it can be assumed that he was the player involved, with records of 'Logan, Falkirk' being linked to Tommy in error after he became a prominent member of the same team within a few years.) | 1 | Falkirk |
| James Low | 1914 | 1914 | 2 | 0 | Heart of Midlothian |
| Willie Lyon | 1938 | 1938 | 2 | 0 | Celtic |
| John Mackenzie | 1949 | 1953 | 2 | 1 | Partick Thistle |
| Willie Maley | 1892 | 1894 | 2 | 0 | Celtic |
| Neil Martin | 1964 | 1964 | 2 | 1 | Hibernian |
| Willie Martin | 1938 | 1938 | 2 | 2 | Clyde |
| James McAlpine | 1928 | 1928 | 2 | 0 | Queen's Park |
| Edward McBain | 1893 | 1896 | 2 | 0 | St Mirren |
| Archie McCall | 1893 | 1894 | 2 | 0 | Renton |
| James McCall | 1892 | 1893 | 2 | 0 | Renton |
| William McCartney | 1902 | 1903 | 2 | 0 | Hibernian |
| Allan McClory | 1926 | 1927 | 2 | 0 | Motherwell |
| Jock McDonald | 1919 | 1919 | 2 | 0 | Airdrieonians |
| Jock McDougall | 1925 | 1927 | 2 | 0 | Airdrieonians |
| Peter McKennan | 1937 | 1938 | 2 | 1 | Partick Thistle |
| Tommy McKenzie | 1934 | 1937 | 2 | 0 | Motherwell |
| Donald McLeod | 1905 | 1906 | 2 | 0 | Celtic |
| Eddie McLeod | 1930 | 1931 | 2 | 0 | Partick Thistle |
| John McLeod | 1892 | 1893 | 2 | 0 | Dumbarton |
| Ian McMillan | 1952 | 1954 | 2 | 0 | Airdrieonians |
| Chris McNee | 1937 | 1939 | 2 | 0 | Hamilton Academical |
| John McPhail | 1950 | 1950 | 2 | 1 | Celtic |
| John McTavish | 1907 | 1908 | 2 | 0 | Falkirk |
| George McWattie | 1901 | 1902 | 2 | 0 | Queen's Park; Heart of Midlothian |
| Bobby Mitchell | 1947 | 1948 | 2 | 1 | Third Lanark |
| David Mitchell | 1893 | 1894 | 2 | 0 | Rangers |
| Tom Mooney | 1933 | 1935 | 2 | 0 | Airdrieonians |
| Willie Muir | 1903 | 1907 | 2 | 0 | Dundee |
| Charlie Napier | 1932 | 1934 | 2 | 2 | Celtic |
| Joe Nibloe | 1929 | 1929 | 2 | 0 | Kilmarnock |
| Gibby Ormond | 1958 | 1958 | 2 | 1 | Airdrieonians |
| Robert Orr | 1919 | 1922 | 2 | 0 | Third Lanark |
| Derek Parlane | 1973 | 1974 | 2 | 0 | Rangers |
| George Paterson | 1935 | 1938 | 2 | 0 | Celtic |
| John Patrick | 1895 | 1898 | 2 | 0 | St Mirren |
| Harry Paul | 1909 | 1909 | 2 | 1 | Queen's Park |
| Willie Pettigrew | 1978 | 1978 | 2 | 1 | Motherwell |
| Bobby Reid | 1934 | 1934 | 2 | 0 | Hamilton Academical |
| James Richardson | 1919 | 1919 | 2 | 2 | Ayr United |
| Andrew Richmond | 1909 | 1909 | 2 | 0 | Queen's Park |
| William Robb | 1921 | 1924 | 2 | 0 | Rangers |
| Archie Robertson | 1954 | 1954 | 2 | 1 | Clyde |
| Willie Russell | 1924 | 1925 | 2 | 0 | Airdrieonians |
| Jimmy Sharp | 1902 | 1903 | 2 | 0 | Dundee |
| Archie Shaw | 1948 | 1951 | 2 | 0 | Motherwell |
| Jock Shaw | 1936 | 1947 | 2 | 0 | Airdrieonians; Rangers |
| Bobby Shearer | 1961 | 1961 | 2 | 0 | Rangers |
| George Sinclair | 1912 | 1919 | 2 | 0 | Heart of Midlothian |
| Graeme Sinclair | 1978 | 1980 | 2 | 0 | Dumbarton |
| James Stark | 1907 | 1909 | 2 | 0 | Rangers |
| Gregor Stevens | 1978 | 1978 | 2 | 0 | Motherwell |
| George Stewart | 1904 | 1906 | 2 | 0 | Hibernian |
| Jackie Stewart | 1952 | 1952 | 2 | 0 | East Fife |
| David Storrier | 1899 | 1901 | 2 | 0 | Celtic |
| James Templeton | 1902 | 1903 | 2 | 0 | Queen's Park |
| Bertie Thomson | 1930 | 1931 | 2 | 0 | Celtic |
| Bobby Thomson | 1978 | 1980 | 2 | 0 | Morton |
| David Thomson | 1921 | 1921 | 2 | 0 | Dundee |
| George Thomson | 1959 | 1960 | 2 | 0 | Heart of Midlothian |
| Alex Troup | 1921 | 1921 | 2 | 0 | Dundee |
| George Walker | 1931 | 1932 | 2 | 0 | St Mirren |
| William Walker | 1909 | 1912 | 2 | 0 | Clyde |
| John White | 1959 | 1959 | 2 | 2 | Falkirk |
| Brian Whittaker | 1978 | 1980 | 2 | 0 | Partick Thistle |
| David Wilson | 1902 | 1903 | 2 | 0 | Queen's Park |
| Robert Wilson (Note: Attributed by London Hearts to Harry Wilson who played for the same club (Partick Thistle) in the same era.) | 1910 | 1911 | 2 | 0 | Partick Thistle |
| Bobby Wishart | 1955 | 1955 | 2 | 1 | Aberdeen |
| Alex Young | 1958 | 1960 | 2 | 2 | Heart of Midlothian |
| Archie Aikman | 1948 | | 1 | 1 | Falkirk |
| Thomas Allan | 1911 | | 1 | 0 | Heart of Midlothian |
| Willie Allan | 1962 | | 1 | 1 | Aberdeen |
| Robert Allison | 1893 | | 1 | 0 | Renton |
| Geordie Anderson | 1892 | | 1 | 0 | Leith Athletic |
| John Anderson | 1911 | | 1 (Note: One more cap should be attributed to John Jackson (Clyde) and one fewer to John Anderson (Falkirk) than listed at London Hearts due to an error in a 1912 match summary.) | 0 | Falkirk |
| Andy Armour | 1909 | | 1 | 0 | Kilmarnock |
| Tommy Atherton | 1901 | | 1 | 0 | Partick Thistle |
| Doug Baird | 1959 | | 1 | 0 | Partick Thistle |
| Johnny Ballantyne | 1930 | | 1 | 0 | Partick Thistle |
| Eamonn Bannon | 1978 | | 1 | 0 | Heart of Midlothian |
| Robert Barbour | 1894 | | 1 | 0 | Third Lanark |
| Bobby Baxter | 1941 | | 1 | 0 | Hibernian |
| Dick Beattie | 1957 | | 1 | 0 | Celtic |
| Frank Beattie | 1961 | | 1 | 0 | Kilmarnock |
| Laurie Bell | 1895 | | 1 | 1 | Third Lanark |
| Bob Bennie | 1928 | | 1 | 0 | Heart of Midlothian |
| George Bertram | 1931 | | 1 | 0 | Airdrieonians |
| Jimmy Binning | 1954 | | 1 | 0 | Queen of the South |
| Bob Birrell | 1921 | | 1 | 0 | Heart of Midlothian |
| Bobby Black | 1954 | | 1 | 2 | Queen of the South |
| Jimmy Black | 1931 | | 1 | 0 | Aberdeen |
| John Blackley | 1972 | | 1 | 0 | Hibernian |
| Bobby Blackwood | 1960 | | 1 | 0 | Heart of Midlothian |
| Willie Blair | 1892 | | 1 | 0 | Third Lanark |
| Alec Boden | 1952 | | 1 | 0 | Celtic |
| Tommy Bogan | 1948 | | 1 | 0 | Celtic |
| Alf Boyd | 1949 | | 1 | 0 | Dundee |
| Henry Boyd | 1894 | | 1 | 0 | Third Lanark |
| Dickie Boyle | 1892 | | 1 | 0 | Dumbarton |
| Jock Bradford | 1912 | | 1 | 0 | Morton |
| Des Bremner | 1976 | | 1 | 0 | Hibernian |
| Gordon Bremner | 1941 | | 1 | 1 | Motherwell (Note: Was on wartime guest loan, did not officially join the club until 5 years later.) |
| Hutton Bremner | 1934 | | 1 | 0 | Queen's Park |
| Allan Brown | 1950 | | 1 | 0 | East Fife |
| Andrew Brown | 1893 | | 1 | 0 | St Mirren |
| Craig Brown | 1922 | | 1 | 0 | Motherwell |
| Finlay Brown | 1931 | | 1 | 0 | Dundee |
| Jim Brown | 1974 | | 1 | 0 | Heart of Midlothian |
| John Brown | 1912 | | 1 | 0 | Celtic |
| John Brown | 1938 | | 1 | 0 | Clyde |
| Sandy Brown | 1963 | | 1 | 0 | Partick Thistle |
| Tommy Brown | 1939 | | 1 | 0 | Heart of Midlothian |
| John Brownlie | 1972 | | 1 | 0 | Hibernian |
| Tommy Burns | 1978 | | 1 | 0 | Celtic |
| Matt Busby | 1941 | | 1 | 0 | Hibernian |
| D. S. Cameron | 1900 | | 1 | 3 | St Bernard's |
| Billy Campbell | 1948 | | 1 (Note: One more cap should be attributed to Billy Campbell and one fewer to Robert Campbell than listed at London Hearts due to an error in a 1948 match summary whereby Robert was counted in place of Billy whom contemporary sources confirm did play.) | 0 | Morton |
| John Campbell | 1899 | | 1 | 1 | Rangers |
| Kenny Campbell | 1921 | | 1 | 0 | Partick Thistle |
| Robert Campbell | 1903 | | 1 | 0 | Partick Thistle |
| Jack Chaplin | 1909 | | 1 | 0 | Dundee |
| John Cherrie | 1892 | | 1 | 0 | Clyde |
| Alec Cheyne | 1929 | | 1 | 0 | Aberdeen |
| William Cheyne | 1936 | | 1 | 0 | Rangers |
| Bobby Clark | 1971 | | 1 | 0 | Aberdeen |
| David Clunie | 1969 | | 1 | 0 | Heart of Midlothian |
| Jim Clunie | 1964 | | 1 | 0 | St Mirren |
| Archie Coats | 1937 | | 1 | 0 | Dundee |
| John Connell | 1895 | | 1 | 1 | St Mirren |
| Paddy Connolly | 1926 | | 1 | 0 | Celtic |
| Jackie Copland | 1974 | | 1 | 0 | Dundee United |
| Andy Cowie | 1948 | | 1 | 0 | Aberdeen |
| Joe Craig | 1976 | | 1 | 1 | Partick Thistle |
| Gordon Crammond | 1978 | | 1 | 0 | Ayr United |
| David Crawford | 1906 | | 1 | 0 | St Mirren |
| John Cross | 1903 | | 1 | 0 | Third Lanark |
| Paddy Crossan | 1914 | | 1 | 0 | Heart of Midlothian |
| Johnny Crum | 1939 | | 1 | 0 | Celtic |
| Joe Cullen | 1894 | | 1 | 0 | Celtic |
| Bill Culley | 1919 | | 1 | 1 | Kilmarnock |
| Peter Curran | 1941 | | 1 | 0 | Partick Thistle |
| John Cuthbertson | 1948 | | 1 | 0 | Hibernian |
| Bert Dainty | 1910 | | 1 | 0 | Dundee |
| Bobby Davidson | 1934 | | 1 | 0 | St Johnstone |
| Tommy Deans | 1948 | | 1 | 0 | Clyde |
| Andrew Devine | 1910 | | 1 | 1 | Falkirk |
| Matthew Dickie | 1898 | | 1 | 0 | Rangers |
| Peter Dickson | 1976 | | 1 | 0 | Queen of the South |
| John Divers | 1895 | | 1 | 0 | Celtic |
| Billy Dougall | 1923 | | 1 | 0 | Falkirk |
| Jamie Doyle | 1980 | | 1 | 0 | Partick Thistle |
| Willie Duff | 1954 | | 1 | 0 | Heart of Midlothian |
| Tom Dunbar | 1895 | | 1 | 0 | Celtic |
| Charlie Duncan | 1921 | | 1 | 1 | Clyde |
| Davie Duncan | 1948 | | 1 | 0 | East Fife |
| John Duncan | 1973 | | 1 | 2 | Dundee |
| Jimmy Duncanson | 1948 | | 1 | 1 | Rangers |
| Jimmy Dundas | 1896 | | 1 | 0 | Dundee |
| James Dunn | 1922 | | 1 | 0 | Hibernian |
| Alex Elliott | 1938 | | 1 | 0 | Partick Thistle |
| Ben Ellis | 1939 | | 1 | 0 | Motherwell |
| Tommy Ewing | 1957 | | 1 | 0 | Partick Thistle |
| Jock Fairbairn | 1893 | | 1 | 0 | Heart of Midlothian |
| Tom Fairfoul | 1909 | | 1 | 0 | Third Lanark |
| John Falconer | 1928 | | 1 | 0 | Cowdenbeath |
| Willie Ferguson | 1896 | | 1 | 0 | Celtic |
| John Finlay | 1909 | | 1 | 0 | Airdrieonians |
| Tony Fitzpatrick | 1978 | | 1 | 0 | St Mirren |
| Jimmy Fleming | 1934 | | 1 | 0 | Rangers |
| Rikki Fleming | 1974 | | 1 | 0 | Ayr United |
| Gerry Follon | 1947 | | 1 | 0 | Dundee |
| James Forrest | 1921 | | 1 | 0 | Clyde |
| Alex Forsyth | 1972 | | 1 | 0 | Partick Thistle |
| John Fraser | 1902 | | 1 | 0 | St Mirren |
| Mark Fulton | 1980 | | 1 | 0 | St Mirren |
| Tommy Gallacher | 1949 | | 1 | 0 | Dundee |
| Ian Gardiner | 1954 | | 1 | 1 | East Fife |
| Tommy Gemmell | 1958 | | 1 | 1 | St Mirren |
| Will Gibson | 1895 | | 1 | 0 | Rangers |
| Willie Gibson | 1980 | | 1 | 0 | Heart of Midlothian |
| Patrick Gilhooley | 1898 | | 1 | 0 | Celtic |
| Dennis Gillespie | 1961 | | 1 | 0 | Dundee United |
| James Gillespie | 1898 | | 1 | 1 | Third Lanark |
| Robert Gillespie | 1922 | | 1 | 0 | Queen's Park |
| John Gilmour | 1930 | | 1 | 1 | Dundee |
| Hugh Goldie | 1895 | | 1 | 0 | St Mirren |
| Tom Gracie | 1914 | | 1 | 1 | Heart of Midlothian |
| Harry Graham | 1914 | | 1 | 0 | Heart of Midlothian |
| James Graham | 1902 | | 1 | 0 | Rangers |
| John L. Graham | 1901 | | 1 | 0 | Kilmarnock |
| Archie Gray | 1903 | | 1 | 0 | Hibernian |
| Don Greenlees | 1904 | | 1 | 0 | St Mirren |
| David Haddow | 1894 | | 1 | 0 | Rangers |
| Henry Hall | 1970 | | 1 | 0 | St Johnstone |
| George Halley | 1910 | | 1 | 0 | Kilmarnock |
| Dave Halliday | 1924 | | 1 | 0 | Dundee |
| Davie Hamilton | 1903 | | 1 | 0 | Celtic |
| James Hamilton | 1924 | | 1 | 0 | St Mirren |
| Johnny Hamilton | 1958 | | 1 | 0 | Heart of Midlothian |
| Tom Hamilton | 1921 | | 1 | 0 | Kilmarnock |
| Colin Hampton | 1912 | | 1 | 0 | Motherwell |
| Andrew Hannah | 1892 | | 1 | 0 | Renton |
| Joe Harper | 1969 | | 1 | 2 | Aberdeen |
| Walter Hay | 1932 | | 1 | 0 | St Mirren |
| Paul Hegarty | 1978 | | 1 | 0 | Dundee United |
| Geordie Henderson | 1923 | | 1 | 1 | Rangers |
| Joe Hendry | 1910 | | 1 | 0 | Rangers |
| Jim Henry | 1970 | | 1 | 0 | Dundee United |
| Sandy Herd | 1934 | | 1 | 0 | Heart of Midlothian |
| Jim Hermiston | 1974 | | 1 | 0 | Aberdeen |
| Jimmy Hickie | 1938 | | 1 | 0 | Clyde |
| John Higgins | 1954 | | 1 | 0 | Celtic |
| Frank Hill | 1930 | | 1 | 0 | Aberdeen |
| Dave Hilley | 1959 | | 1 | 0 | Third Lanark |
| Hugh Hilley | 1924 | | 1 | 0 | Celtic |
| George Hogg | 1896 | | 1 | 0 | Heart of Midlothian |
| Bobby Holmes | 1957 | | 1 | 0 | St Mirren |
| David Holt | 1964 | | 1 | 0 | Heart of Midlothian |
| Harry Hood | 1970 | | 1 | 0 | Celtic |
| Bobby Houston | 1978 | | 1 | 0 | Partick Thistle |
| James Howie | 1901 | | 1 | 0 | Kilmarnock |
| Bobby Howitt | 1953 | | 1 | 0 | Partick Thistle |
| Wilson Humphries | 1952 | | 1 | 0 | Motherwell |
| Ally Hunter | 1972 | | 1 | 0 | Kilmarnock |
| Willie Hunter | 1909 | | 1 | 0 | Airdrieonians |
| Jackie Husband | 1947 | | 1 | 0 | Partick Thistle |
| John Hutcheson | 1933 | | 1 | 0 | Falkirk |
| Tommy Hynds | 1901 | | 1 | 0 | Celtic |
| Alex Ingram | 1969 | | 1 | 0 | Ayr United |
| Colin Jackson | 1976 | | 1 | 0 | Rangers |
| James Jackson | 1922 | | 1 | 0 | Motherwell |
| John Jackson | 1912 | | 1 | 0 | Clyde |
| Drew Jarvie | 1971 | | 1 | 0 | Airdrieonians |
| Tom Jarvie | 1939 | | 1 | 0 | Hamilton Academical |
| James Johnston | 1903 | | 1 | 0 | Third Lanark |
| Peter Johnstone | 1914 | | 1 | 0 | Celtic |
| Sammy Kean | 1947 | | 1 | 0 | Hibernian |
| Alex Keillor | 1897 | | 1 | 0 | Dundee |
| Bernie Kelly | 1957 | | 1 | 1 | Raith Rovers |
| Johnny Kelly | 1947 | | 1 | 0 | Third Lanark |
| Bob Kelso | 1898 | | 1 | 0 | Dundee |
| Jack Kennedy | 1897 | | 1 | 0 | Hibernian |
| Robert Keyes | 1939 | | 1 | 0 | Falkirk |
| Tommy Kiernan | 1947 | | 1 | 0 | Celtic |
| Willie Kilmarnock | 1948 | | 1 | 0 | Motherwell |
| James King | 1932 | | 1 | 0 | Hamilton Academical |
| John King | 1912 | | 1 | 0 | Partick Thistle |
| James Kirkwood | 1893 | | 1 (Note: One more cap should be attributed to William Thomson and one fewer to James Kirkwood than listed at London Hearts due to an error in an 1895 match summary.) | 0 | Abercorn |
| Alex Lambie | 1928 | | 1 | 0 | Partick Thistle |
| Jimmy Lawson | 1912 | | 1 | 0 | Dundee |
| Tom Ledgerwood | 1952 | | 1 | 0 | Partick Thistle |
| Willie Lennie | 1910 | | 1 | 0 | Aberdeen |
| Alec Linwood | 1948 | | 1 | 0 | Hibernian |
| George Livingstone | 1907 | | 1 | 0 | Rangers |
| James Logan | 1913 | | 1 | 0 | Rangers |
| Andy Love | 1929 | | 1 | 0 | Aberdeen |
| Tommy Low | 1897 | | 1 | 1 | Rangers |
| Alex MacDonald | 1976 | | 1 | 0 | Rangers |
| Willie MacFadyen | 1934 | | 1 | 2 | Motherwell |
| Rab Macfarlane | 1897 | | 1 | 0 | Third Lanark |
| Dave MacKinnon | 1980 | | 1 | 0 | Partick Thistle |
| Bert MacLachlan | 1920 | | 1 | 0 | Aberdeen |
| Johnny MacLeod | 1961 | | 1 | 0 | Hibernian |
| Murdo MacLeod | 1978 | | 1 | 0 | Dumbarton |
| Keith MacRae | 1970 | | 1 | 0 | Motherwell |
| James Main | 1908 | | 1 | 0 | Hibernian |
| Jim Mallan | 1949 | | 1 | 0 | Celtic |
| Danny Malloy | 1955 | | 1 | 0 | Dundee |
| Peter Marinello | 1978 | | 1 | 0 | Motherwell |
| James Marshall | 1932 | | 1 | 0 | Rangers |
| Robert Marshall | 1895 | | 1 | 0 | Rangers |
| Allan Martin | 1896 | | 1 | 3 | Celtic |
| David Mathers | 1956 | | 1 | 0 | Partick Thistle |
| Willie Mathieson | 1969 | | 1 | 0 | Rangers |
| Bud Maxwell | 1933 | | 1 | 0 | Kilmarnock |
| James Maxwell | 1907 | | 1 | 0 | Kilmarnock |
| William Maxwell | 1902 | | 1 | 0 | Third Lanark |
| Colin McAdam | 1978 | | 1 | 0 | Partick Thistle |
| Bob McAuley | 1931 | | 1 | 0 | Rangers |
| Pat McAuley | 1948 | | 1 | 0 | Celtic |
| James McBride | 1892 | | 1 | 0 | Renton |
| Bobby McCallum | 1966 | | 1 | 0 | Motherwell |
| Neil McCallum | 1892 | | 1 | 0 | Celtic |
| Bob McCartney | 1898 | | 1 | 0 | Heart of Midlothian |
| Bob McColl | 1901 | | 1 | 1 | Queen's Park |
| Andrew McCreadie | 1893 | | 1 | 0 | Rangers |
| Alan McCulloch | 1980 | | 1 | 0 | Kilmarnock |
| David McCulloch | 1934 | | 1 | 1 | Heart of Midlothian |
| Fred McDiarmid | 1902 | | 1 | 0 | Dundee |
| Derrick McDicken | 1980 | | 1 | 1 | Kilmarnock |
| Malky McDonald | 1941 | | 1 | 0 | Celtic |
| Tom McFarlane | 1897 | | 1 | 0 | Hibernian |
| Willie McFarlane | 1947 | | 1 | 0 | Heart of Midlothian |
| Frank McGarvey | 1978 | | 1 | 0 | St Mirren |
| Charlie McGill | 1935 | | 1 | 0 | Aberdeen |
| William McGinnigle | 1924 | | 1 | 0 | Hibernian |
| Danny McGrain | 1973 | | 1 | 0 | Celtic |
| James McGurk | 1941 | | 1 | 0 | Hamilton Academical |
| Johnny McIlwaine | 1927 | | 1 | 0 | Falkirk |
| Tom McInnes | 1892 | | 1 | 2 | Dumbarton |
| Jock McIntyre | 1921 | | 1 | 0 | Morton |
| Bobby McKay | 1925 | | 1 | 0 | Rangers |
| Bobby McKean | 1976 | | 1 | 0 | Rangers |
| Alexander McLardy | 1893 | | 1 | 0 | Abercorn |
| Sandy McLaughlan | 1962 | | 1 | 0 | Kilmarnock |
| Stuart McLean | 1980 | | 1 | 0 | Kilmarnock |
| Ally McLeod | 1980 | | 1 | 0 | Hibernian |
| Thomas McMillan | 1894 | | 1 | 0 | Dumbarton |
| Jackie McNamara, Sr. | 1980 | | 1 | 1 | Hibernian |
| Alex McNeill | 1900 | | 1 | 0 | Port Glasgow Athletic |
| Andrew McPherson | 1902 | | 1 | 0 | Morton |
| Jim McPhie | 1948 | | 1 | 0 | Falkirk |
| Denis McQuade | 1972 | | 1 | 1 | Partick Thistle |
| George McQueen | 1925 | | 1 | 0 | Airdrieonians |
| Danny McRorie | 1930 | | 1 | 0 | Morton |
| Peter Meechan | 1896 | | 1 | 0 | Celtic |
| Jim Melrose | 1980 | | 1 | 1 | Partick Thistle |
| Frank Mennie | 1949 | | 1 | 0 | Clyde |
| Willie Michael | 1899 | | 1 | 1 | Heart of Midlothian |
| Peter Millar | 1974 | | 1 | 0 | Motherwell |
| Archie Miller | 1938 | | 1 | 0 | Heart of Midlothian |
| George Miller | 1964 | | 1 | 0 | Heart of Midlothian |
| John Miller | 1892 | | 1 | 2 | Dumbarton |
| Tommy Miller | 1910 | | 1 | 0 | Falkirk |
| Willie Miller | 1934 | | 1 | 0 | Partick Thistle |
| Willie Miller | 1976 | | 1 | 0 | Aberdeen |
| James Mitchell | 1910 | | 1 | 0 | Kilmarnock |
| Jimmy Mitchell | 1955 | | 1 | 0 | Aberdeen |
| Willie Moffat | 1931 | | 1 | 0 | Hamilton Academical |
| Hugh Morgan | 1898 | | 1 | 1 | St Mirren |
| Lew Morgan | 1933 | | 1 | 0 | Dundee |
| David Morris | 1923 | | 1 | 0 | Raith Rovers |
| Eric Morris | 1980 | | 1 | 0 | Ayr United |
| Hugh Morton | 1928 | | 1 | 0 | Kilmarnock |
| Billy Muir | 1960 | | 1 | 0 | Kilmarnock |
| Iain Munro | 1980 | | 1 | 0 | St Mirren |
| Frank Murphy | 1936 | | 1 | 1 | Celtic |
| George Murray | 1965 | | 1 | 0 | Motherwell |
| Pat Murray | 1897 | | 1 | 0 | Hibernian |
| David Narey | 1978 | | 1 | 0 | Dundee United |
| William Nash | 1899 | | 1 | 0 | Clyde |
| Bobby Neill | 1901 | | 1 | 0 | Rangers |
| Willie Neil | 1927 | | 1 | 1 | Airdrieonians |
| John Neilson | 1900 | | 1 | 1 | Third Lanark |
| Davie Ness | 1934 | | 1 | 1 | Partick Thistle |
| Willie Nicholson | 1934 | | 1 | 0 | Rangers |
| Bobby Nutley | 1939 | | 1 | 1 | Hibernian |
| Willie O'Neill | 1968 | | 1 | 0 | Celtic |
| Neil Orr | 1980 | | 1 | 0 | Morton |
| James Oswald | 1900 | | 1 | 0 | Leith Athletic |
| Jock Paterson | 1952 | | 1 | 0 | Hibernian |
| Tommy Pearson | 1948 | | 1 | 0 | Aberdeen |
| Iain Philip | 1972 | | 1 | 0 | Dundee |
| William Porter | 1900 | | 1 | 0 | Third Lanark |
| Bobby Prentice | 1974 | | 1 | 0 | Heart of Midlothian |
| John Prentice | 1953 | | 1 | 0 | Rangers |
| Thomas Preston | 1924 | | 1 | 0 | Airdrieonians |
| Charlie Pringle | 1921 | | 1 | 0 | St Mirren |
| William Proudfoot | 1892 | | 1 | 0 | Clyde |
| David Provan | 1967 | | 1 | 0 | Rangers |
| David Provan | 1978 | | 1 | 0 | Kilmarnock |
| John Rankin | 1911 | | 1 | 0 | Third Lanark |
| Willie Rankin | 1926 | | 1 | 0 | Dundee |
| Tom Reid | 1926 | | 1 | 0 | Heart of Midlothian |
| Lex Richardson | 1980 | | 1 | 0 | St Mirren |
| Jim Richmond | 1960 | | 1 | 0 | Kilmarnock |
| Andy Ritchie | 1980 | | 1 | 1 | Morton |
| Bobby Roberts | 1963 | | 1 | 0 | Motherwell |
| George Robertson | 1937 | | 1 | 0 | Kilmarnock |
| Peter Robertson | 1902 | | 1 | 0 | Dundee |
| Robert Robertson | 1909 | | 1 | 0 | St Mirren |
| Colin Rodger | 1935 | | 1 | 0 | Ayr United |
| Andy Rolland | 1976 | | 1 | 0 | Dundee United |
| Alex Rollo | 1951 | | 1 | 0 | Celtic |
| Sydney Ross | 1892 | | 1 | 0 | Cambuslang |
| Alan Rough | 1978 | | 1 | 0 | Partick Thistle |
| Davie Russell | 1897 | | 1 | 0 | Celtic |
| Eddie Rutherford | 1950 | | 1 | 1 | Rangers |
| Thomas Scott | 1922 | | 1 | 0 | Falkirk |
| Bob Shankly | 1937 | | 1 | 0 | Falkirk |
| Willie Sharp | 1952 | | 1 | 0 | Partick Thistle |
| Doug Sharpe | 1952 | | 1 | 0 | Queen of the South |
| Chris Shevlane | 1964 | | 1 | 0 | Heart of Midlothian |
| Jock Simpson | 1910 | | 1 | 0 | Falkirk |
| Ronnie Simpson | 1968 | | 1 | 0 | Celtic |
| Eric Sinclair | 1980 | | 1 | 1 | Dundee |
| Leslie Skene | 1904 | | 1 | 0 | Queen's Park |
| Bobby Skinner | 1927 | | 1 | 2 | Dunfermline Athletic |
| George Smith | 1958 | | 1 | 0 | Partick Thistle |
| Jimmy Smith | 1941 | | 1 | 0 | Rangers |
| Jimmy Smith | 1968 | | 1 | 0 | Aberdeen |
| John Smith | 1926 | | 1 | 0 | Ayr United |
| Thomas Smith | 1933 | | 1 | 0 | Queen's Park |
| Tom Smith | 1936 | | 1 (Note: One more cap should be attributed to Tommy Smith (Dundee) and one fewer to Tom Smith (Kilmarnock) than listed at London Hearts due to an error in a 1937 match summary.) | 0 | Kilmarnock |
| Tommy Smith | 1937 | | 1 | 0 | Dundee |
| Jimmy Soye | 1911 | | 1 | 0 | Aberdeen |
| Finlay Speedie | 1905 | | 1 | 0 | Rangers |
| Jock Stein | 1954 | | 1 | 0 | Celtic |
| Willie Stevenson | 1959 | | 1 | 0 | Rangers |
| Eric Stevenson | 1969 | | 1 | 0 | Hibernian |
| Alex Stewart | 1919 | | 1 | 0 | Partick Thistle |
| Alex Stewart (Note: Attributed by London Hearts to Willie Stewart who played for the same club (Motherwell) at the time.) | 1937 | | 1 | 0 | Motherwell |
| Robert Stewart | 1907 | | 1 | 0 | Morton |
| Gerry Sweeney | 1969 | | 1 | 0 | Morton |
| Willie Telfer | 1932 | | 1 | 1 | Motherwell |
| James Tennant | 1899 | | 1 | 0 | St Bernard's |
| David Thackeray | 1927 | | 1 | 0 | Motherwell |
| Andrew Thomson | 1893 | | 1 | 0 | Third Lanark |
| Billy Thomson | 1980 | | 1 | 0 | St Mirren |
| Eddie Thomson | 1969 | | 1 | 0 | Heart of Midlothian |
| Jock Thomson | 1929 | | 1 | 0 | Dundee |
| Robert Thomson | 1927 | | 1 | 0 | Falkirk |
| William Thomson | 1895 | | 1 | 0 | Dumbarton |
| Willie Thornton | 1949 | | 1 | 0 | Rangers |
| Jim Tolmie | 1980 | | 1 | 0 | Morton |
| Charles Traynor | 1897 | | 1 | 0 | Abercorn |
| Johnny Urquhart | 1954 | | 1 | 1 | Heart of Midlothian |
| Rod Walker | 1911 | | 1 | 0 | Heart of Midlothian |
| Dougie Wallace | 1941 | | 1 | 1 | Clyde |
| Jim Wallace | 1974 | | 1 | 0 | Dunfermline Athletic |
| Joe Walters | 1960 | | 1 | 0 | Clyde |
| James Warden | 1933 | | 1 | 0 | Third Lanark |
| Willie Wardrope | 1903 | | 1 | 0 | Third Lanark |
| Joe Wark | 1976 | | 1 | 0 | Motherwell |
| Jimmy Watson | 1950 | | 1 | 1 | Motherwell |
| Phil Watson | 1930 | | 1 | 0 | Hamilton Academical |
| Willie Watson | 1933 | | 1 | 0 | Hibernian |
| Andy Weir | 1960 | | 1 | 0 | Motherwell |
| James Welsh | 1952 | | 1 | 0 | Airdrieonians |
| Tom Wilkie | 1899 | | 1 | 0 | St Bernard's |
| Bobby Wilson | 1967 | | 1 | 0 | Dundee |
| George Wilson | 1906 | | 1 | 0 | Heart of Midlothian |
| Hughie Wilson | 1902 | | 1 | 0 | Third Lanark |
| Jock Wilson | 1896 | | 1 | 0 | St Bernard's |
| James Wilson | 1904 | | 1 | 0 | St Mirren |
| Jimmy Wilson | 1967 | | 1 | 0 | Aberdeen |
| Willie Wilson | 1915 | | 1 | 0 | Heart of Midlothian |
| Willie Wiseman | 1926 | | 1 | 0 | Queen's Park |
| Alex Wright | 1922 | | 1 | 0 | Aberdeen |
| Alex Wylie | 1893 | | 1 | 0 | St Mirren |
| Jock Wyllie | 1914 | | 1 | 0 | Aberdeen |
| Harry Yorston | 1952 | | 1 | 0 | Aberdeen |

== Scotland trial matches / SFL Centenary players ==
- During World War I, no inter-league matches were played after the English and Irish leagues were suspended in 1915. The Scottish League continued to operate, and three post-season challenge matches were arranged in 1915, 1916 and 1917, with the proceeds going to charities and war fundraising; the SFL XI (including some players who were contracted to English clubs but had returned to play in Scotland temporarily as the league continued, while the English Football League was suspended) played against the title-winning club, which was Celtic on all three occasions. An additional match against a Military XI was also played in 1917 (again no Celtic players were selected as they played the Glasgow Merchants Charity Cup final on the same day). In 1918, the Navy and Army War Fund Shield was played between clubs instead.
- Between 1958 and 1964, except in 1963, the Scottish League XI played an annual mid-season trial match against the Scotland (SFA) team (or an approximation thereof) in an attempt to judge the ability of players in both sides for possible selection for the national squad. A previous similar match took place in 1955 between Scotland and Scotland B. Due to the matches' potential importance for some of the players' careers, they were taken fairly seriously and were well attended, although some call-offs through injury and clashes with important club fixtures led to weaker teams taking the field than the original squads in some cases. As they were not inter-league fixtures, these six matches are counted separately from other SFL XI totals, likewise the Scotland appearances and goals are not official – some of the players selected never received a full cap. A few players featured for both sides, particularly when they had played for an SFL club but then moved to England so were no longer eligible. The trials did serve as a stepping stone to the Scotland team for some players on both the SFA and SFL teams, although in terms of improving the standard of international players, the experimental series could be judged not to have been particularly successful as Scotland made little impact on the first relevant tournament after the initial trial match (the 1958 FIFA World Cup) and failed to qualify for the next seven major competitions, their next being the 1974 FIFA World Cup. They did manage to win three editions of the British Home Championship outright in the 1960s.
- The 16-man SFL centenary match squad which faced Scotland's 1990 FIFA World Cup squad in August 1990 contained 10 players who were already full internationals. Boyd, Lambert, Robertson, Wright and McKinlay were later capped by Scotland (Boyd within weeks); only Dutchman van der Hoorn was never selected for his country.
- Flag icon in FIFA field shows the player gained a full FIFA-recognised cap for that nation.

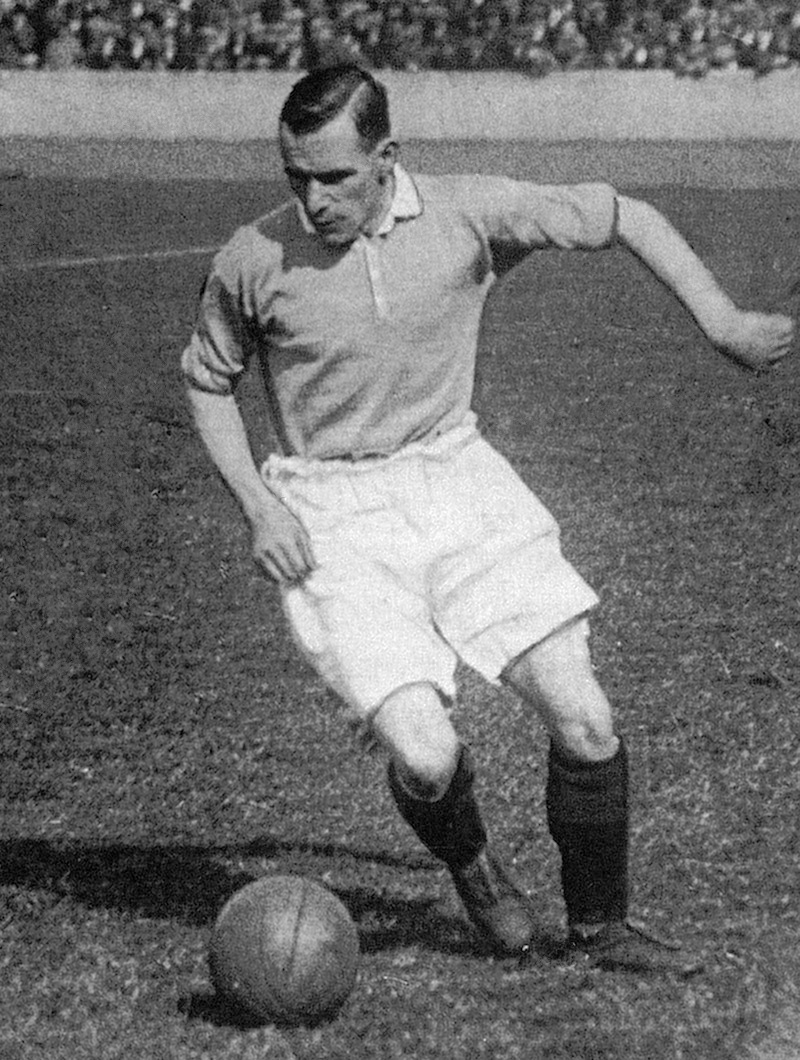
Alan Morton played for the Scottish League in three World War I fundraising games, then made 15 appearances in official inter-league matches.

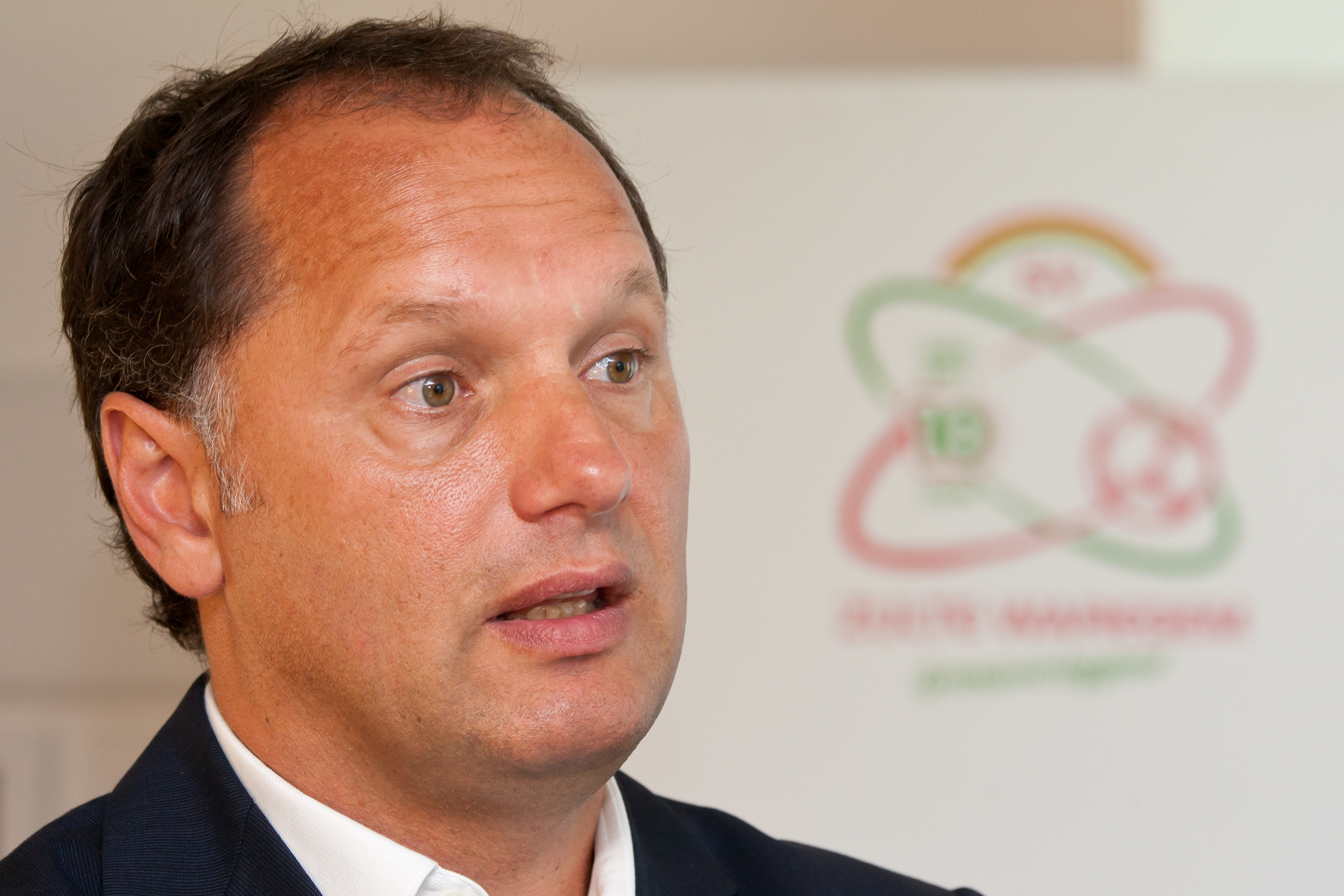
Netherlands national football team player Hans Gillhaus played for the Scottish League XI in its last ever match, in 1990. Gillhaus scored the only goal as the Scottish League won 1–0 against the Scotland national football team.

| Name | First | Last | Caps | Goals | FIFA |
|---|---|---|---|---|---|
| Peter Nellies | 1915 | 1917 | 4 | 0 | (Scotland) |
| Andy Kerr | 1958 | 1961 | 3 | 3 | (Scotland) |
| Alan Morton | 1915 | 1917 | 3 | 0 | (Scotland) |
| Jock Simpson | 1916 | 1917 | 3 | 1 | (England) |
| James Bowie | 1917 | 1917 | 2 | 2 | (Scotland) |
| Tommy Cairns | 1916 | 1917 | 2 | 0 | (Scotland) |
| Alan Cousin | 1960 | 1962 | 2 | 2 | |
| Jimmy Gordon | 1915 | 1916 | 2 | 0 | (Scotland) |
| Joe Hogan | 1960 | 1962 | 2 | 0 | |
| Bert McCann | 1959 | 1961 | 2 | 1 | (Scotland) |
| Davie McParland | 1961 | 1964 | 2 | 2 | |
| Bob Mercer | 1916 | 1917 | 2 | 0 | (Scotland) |
| Pat Quinn | 1961 | 1962 | 2 | 2 | (Scotland) |
| Alex Stewart | 1916 | 1917 | 2 | 0 | |
| Willie Toner | 1960 | 1961 | 2 | 0 | (Scotland) |
| Doug Baird | 1959 | 1959 | 1 | 0 | |
| Jim Baxter | 1960 | 1960 | 1 | 0 | (Scotland) |
| Frank Beattie | 1964 | 1964 | 1 | 0 | |
| Jimmy Blair | 1917 | 1917 | 1 | 0 | (Scotland) |
| Tom Blair | 1917 | 1917 | 1 | 0 | |
| Pat Bonner | 1990 | 1990 | 1 | 0 | (Republic of Ireland) |
| Tom Boyd | 1990 | 1990 | 1 | 0 | (Scotland) |
| Bill Brown | 1958 | 1958 | 1 | 0 | (Scotland) |
| Jimmy Brownlie | 1917 | 1917 | 1 | 0 | (Scotland) |
| Bobby Carroll | 1962 | 1962 | 1 | 1 | |
| Bobby Collins | 1958 | 1958 | 1 | 0 | (Scotland) |
| Eddie Connachan | 1962 | 1962 | 1 | 0 | (Scotland) |
| Bobby Connor | 1990 | 1990 | 1 | 0 | (Scotland) |
| Bobby Cox | 1961 | 1961 | 1 | 0 | |
| Alex Craig | 1915 | 1915 | 1 | 0 | (Ireland) |
| Paddy Crerand | 1961 | 1961 | 1 | 0 | (Scotland) |
| Paddy Crossan | 1915 | 1915 | 1 | 0 | |
| Jim Cruickshank | 1964 | 1964 | 1 | 0 | (Scotland) |
| Bill Culley | 1917 | 1917 | 1 | 0 | |
| Andy Cunningham | 1915 | 1915 | 1 | 0 | (Scotland) |
| Neil Duffy | 1964 | 1964 | 1 | 0 | |
| Alex Edwards | 1964 | 1964 | 1 | 0 | |
| Bobby Evans | 1958 | 1958 | 1 | 0 | (Scotland) |
| Hughie Ferguson | 1917 | 1917 | 1 | 0 | |
| Jimmy Gabriel | 1960 | 1960 | 1 | 0 | (Scotland) |
| Hans Gillhaus | 1990 | 1990 | 1 | 1 | (Netherlands) |
| Jimmy Goodfellow | 1962 | 1962 | 1 | 0 | |
| Jimmy Gourlay | 1915 | 1915 | 1 | 0 | |
| Matt Gray | 1959 | 1959 | 1 | 0 | |
| John Greig | 1964 | 1964 | 1 | 0 | (Scotland) |
| Billy Hainey | 1964 | 1964 | 1 | 0 | |
| Johnny Hamilton | 1960 | 1960 | 1 | 0 | |
| George Herd | 1960 | 1960 | 1 | 0 | (Scotland) |
| Billy Higgins | 1962 | 1962 | 1 | 0 | |
| Willie Hunter | 1962 | 1962 | 1 | 0 | (Scotland) |
| Jim Kennedy | 1962 | 1962 | 1 | 0 | (Scotland) |
| Gordon Kerr | 1915 | 1915 | 1 | 0 | |
| Peter Kerr | 1917 | 1917 | 1 | 0 | (Scotland) |
| Michael Kiernan | 1917 | 1917 | 1 | 0 | |
| Andy King | 1964 | 1964 | 1 | 0 | |
| Istvan Kozma | 1990 | 1990 | 1 | 0 | (Hungary) |
| Miodrag Krivokapic | 1990 | 1990 | 1 | 0 | (Socialist Federal Republic of Yugoslavia) |
| Paul Lambert | 1990 | 1990 | 1 | 0 | (Scotland) |
| John Little | 1960 | 1960 | 1 | 0 | (Scotland) |
| James Low | 1915 | 1915 | 1 | 0 | |
| Dave Mackay | 1958 | 1958 | 1 | 0 | (Scotland) |
| Duncan MacKay | 1959 | 1959 | 1 | 0 | (Scotland) |
| Bert Manderson | 1916 | 1916 | 1 | 0 | (Ireland) |
| Andy Matthew | 1958 | 1958 | 1 | 0 | |
| George McCallum | 1959 | 1959 | 1 | 0 | |
| Ian McColl | 1958 | 1958 | 1 | 0 | (Scotland) |
| John McCormick | 1962 | 1962 | 1 | 0 | |
| Jimmy McEwan | 1959 | 1959 | 1 | 0 | |
| Jackie McGrory | 1964 | 1964 | 1 | 0 | (Scotland) |
| Jackie McInally | 1961 | 1961 | 1 | 0 | |
| Jim McInally | 1990 | 1990 | 1 | 0 | (Scotland) |
| Bert McIntosh | 1917 | 1917 | 1 | 0 | |
| Jimmy McIntosh | 1958 | 1958 | 1 | 0 | |
| Billy McKinlay | 1990 | 1990 | 1 | 0 | (Scotland) |
| Malcolm McPhail | 1917 | 1917 | 1 | 3 | |
| John McTavish | 1916 | 1916 | 1 | 0 | (Scotland) |
| Chris Morris | 1990 | 1990 | 1 | 0 | (Republic of Ireland) |
| Jimmy Murray | 1958 | 1958 | 1 | 1 | (Scotland) |
| Charlie Nicholas | 1990 | 1990 | 1 | 0 | (Scotland) |
| George Niven | 1960 | 1960 | 1 | 0 | |
| John Ogston | 1961 | 1961 | 1 | 0 | |
| George Ormond | 1917 | 1917 | 1 | 0 | |
| Willie Ormond | 1959 | 1959 | 1 | 0 | (Scotland) |
| Andy Penman | 1961 | 1961 | 1 | 0 | (Scotland) |
| David Provan | 1964 | 1964 | 1 | 0 | (Scotland) |
| James Reid | 1915 | 1915 | 1 | 0 | (Scotland) |
| Willie Reid | 1916 | 1916 | 1 | 0 | (Scotland) |
| Frank Reilly | 1915 | 1915 | 1 | 0 | |
| David Robertson | 1990 | 1990 | 1 | 0 | (Scotland) |
| Walter Rutherford | 1917 | 1917 | 1 | 0 | |
| Alex Scott | 1960 | 1960 | 1 | 1 | (Scotland) |
| Bobby Seith | 1962 | 1962 | 1 | 0 | |
| Bobby Shearer | 1961 | 1961 | 1 | 0 | (Scotland) |
| Chris Shevlane | 1964 | 1964 | 1 | 0 | |
| Eric Smith | 1959 | 1959 | 1 | 0 | (Scotland) |
| Theo Snelders | 1990 | 1990 | 1 | 0 | (Netherlands) |
| Gary Stevens | 1990 | 1990 | 1 | 0 | (England) |
| Ian St John | 1960 | 1960 | 1 | 0 | (Scotland) |
| Fred van der Hoorn | 1990 | 1990 | 1 | 0 | |
| Jock Wallace | 1959 | 1959 | 1 | 0 | |
| Jimmy Wardhaugh | 1958 | 1958 | 1 | 0 | (Scotland) |
| John White | 1959 | 1959 | 1 | 3 | (Scotland) |
| Tom White | 1964 | 1964 | 1 | 0 | |
| Jock Wilson | 1916 | 1916 | 1 | 0 | |
| John Stewart Wright | 1917 | 1917 | 1 | 0 | |
| Keith Wright | 1990 | 1990 | 1 | 0 | (Scotland) |
| Alex Young | 1958 | 1958 | 1 | 1 | (Scotland) |

=== Players for Scotland XI against SFL XI ===
- § = Player was never capped at full international level.

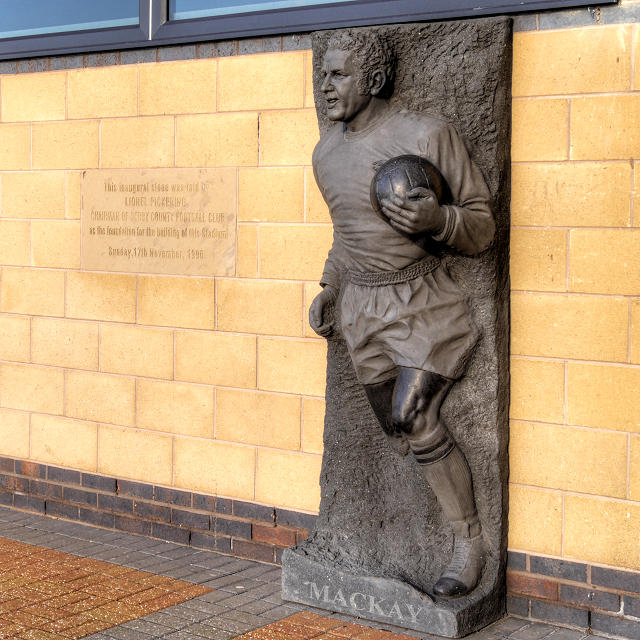
Dave Mackay played for the Scotland XI against the Scottish League in three trial matches.

| Name | First cap | Last cap | Caps | Goals |
|---|---|---|---|---|
| Eric Caldow | 1958 | 1961 | 4 | 0 |
| Dave Mackay | 1959 | 1962 | 3 | 0 |
| Alex Parker | 1958 | 1960 | 3 | 0 |
| Bill Brown | 1959 | 1962 | 2 | 0 |
| Bobby Collins | 1959 | 1960 | 2 | 0 |
| John Cumming | 1959 | 1960 | 2 | 0 |
| Alex Scott | 1958 | 1959 | 2 | 0 |
| John White | 1962 | 1964 | 2 | 0 |
| Charlie Aitken § | 1962 | 1962 | 1 | 0 |
| Roy Aitken | 1990 | 1990 | 1 | 0 |
| Sammy Baird | 1958 | 1958 | 1 | 0 |
| Jim Baxter | 1961 | 1964 | 2 | 0 |
| Ralph Brand | 1961 | 1961 | 1 | 1 |
| Billy Bremner | 1964 | 1964 | 1 | 0 |
| John Collins | 1990 | 1990 | 1 | 0 |
| John Colrain § | 1959 | 1959 | 1 | 3 |
| Doug Cowie | 1958 | 1958 | 1 | 0 |
| Dan Currie § | 1958 | 1958 | 1 | 1 |
| Pat Delaney § | 1964 | 1964 | 1 | 0 |
| Tommy Docherty | 1958 | 1958 | 1 | 0 |
| Bobby Evans | 1959 | 1959 | 1 | 0 |
| Robert Fleck | 1990 | 1990 | 1 | 0 |
| Campbell Forsyth | 1964 | 1964 | 1 | 0 |
| Dave Gibson | 1959 | 1959 | 1 | 0 |
| Alan Gilzean | 1962 | 1962 | 1 | 2 |
| Andy Goram | 1990 | 1990 | 1 | 0 |
| Frank Haffey | 1960 | 1960 | 1 | 0 |
| Alex Hamilton | 1962 | 1964 | 2 | 0 |
| John Harvey § | 1960 | 1960 | 1 | 0 |
| Willie Henderson | 1964 | 1964 | 1 | 0 |
| David Herd | 1961 | 1961 | 1 | 2 |
| John Hewie | 1958 | 1958 | 1 | 0 |
| Dave Hilley § | 1961 | 1962 | 2 | 1 |
| David Holt | 1964 | 1964 | 1 | 0 |
| Willie Hunter | 1960 | 1960 | 1 | 0 |
| Stewart Imlach | 1958 | 1958 | 1 | 1 |
| Denis Law | 1960 | 1960 | 1 | 2 |
| Graham Leggat | 1959 | 1959 | 1 | 0 |
| Lawrie Leslie | 1961 | 1961 | 1 | 0 |
| Duncan MacKay | 1961 | 1961 | 1 | 0 |
| Gary Mackay | 1990 | 1990 | 1 | 0 |
| Johnny MacLeod | 1961 | 1962 | 2 | 0 |
| Maurice Malpas | 1990 | 1990 | 1 | 0 |
| Gary McAllister | 1990 | 1990 | 1 | 0 |
| Joe McBride | 1964 | 1964 | 1 | 2 |
| Bert McCann | 1960 | 1960 | 1 | 0 |
| Chris McCart § | 1990 | 1990 | 1 | 0 |
| Ally McCoist | 1990 | 1990 | 1 | 0 |
| Brien McIlroy § | 1964 | 1964 | 1 | 1 |
| Frank McLintock | 1962 | 1964 | 2 | 0 |
| Stuart McKimmie | 1990 | 1990 | 1 | 0 |
| Billy McNeill | 1961 | 1961 | 1 | 0 |
| Dave McPherson | 1990 | 1990 | 1 | 0 |
| Paul McStay | 1990 | 1990 | 1 | 0 |
| Campbell Money § | 1990 | 1990 | 1 | 0 |
| Jackie Mudie | 1958 | 1958 | 1 | 1 |
| Stuart Munro § | 1990 | 1990 | 1 | 0 |
| Pat Nevin | 1990 | 1990 | 1 | 0 |
| John Robertson | 1990 | 1990 | 1 | 0 |
| Ian St John | 1962 | 1962 | 1 | 0 |
| Ian Ure | 1962 | 1962 | 1 | 0 |
| Andy Weir | 1960 | 1960 | 1 | 0 |
| Davie Wilson | 1961 | 1961 | 1 | 0 |
| Ron Yeats | 1964 | 1964 | 1 | 0 |
| Alex Young | 1960 | 1960 | 1 | 0 |
| Tommy Younger | 1958 | 1958 | 1 | 0 |
