= Alex Neil =

Alex Neil, Alexander Neill, or variant may refer to:

Neil

- Alex Neil (footballer) (born 1981), Scottish football player and manager (Hamilton Academical, Norwich City, Preston North End)
- Alex Neil (politician) (born 1951), Scottish politician

Neill

- A. S. Neill a.k.a. Alexander Sutherland Neill (1883–1973), Scottish progressive educator, author and founder of Summerhill school
- Alec Neill a.k.a. Alexander George Neill (born 1950), New Zealand politician

== See also ==
- Alex McNeill (fl. 1890s), Scottish footballer
- Alexander McNeill (1842–1932), Canadian politician
- Alexander McNeill (New Zealand politician) (1833–1915), New Zealand politician
