= Walter Rutherford =

Walter Rutherford may refer to:

- Walter Rutherford (footballer) (1891–1944), Scottish footballer
- Walter Rutherford (golfer) (1857–1913), Scottish golfer
- Walter R. Peterson Jr. (1922–2011), American educator and politician

== See also ==
- Walter Rutherfurd (1723–1804), Scottish-American soldier and merchant
