= George Niven =

Scottish footballer

Personal information
- Date of birth: 11 June 1929
- Place of birth: Blairhall, Scotland
- Date of death: 17 July 2008 (aged 79)
- Place of death: Kingussie, Scotland
- Position: Goalkeeper

Senior career*
Years	Team	Apps	(Gls)
–	Coupar Angus		
1951–1962	Rangers	221	(0)
1962–1969	Partick Thistle	182	(0)
Total		403	(0)

International career
1953–1960	Scottish League XI	7	(0)
1955	Scotland B vs A trial	1	(0)
1960	SFL trial v SFA	1	(0)
- * Club domestic league appearances and goals

George Niven (11 June 1929 – 17 July 2008) was a Scottish footballer who played during the 1950s and 1960s as a goalkeeper for Rangers and Partick Thistle.

== Career ==
=== Club ===
Niven was signed to Rangers from junior side Coupar Angus in 1951 by manager Bill Struth. He made his debut against Aberdeen on 19 April 1952 in the final league match of the season, which finished 1–1. He spent over ten years at Ibrox and won five league championships, two Scottish Cups, one League Cup, four Glasgow Cups and three Charity Cups. He made 327 appearances in total for the club.

In February 1962 he joined Partick Thistle. Whilst in Maryhill he would make a total of 232 first class appearances and become an ever present in the Jags goal. He never missed a league match in three separate seasons: 1962–63, 1963–64 and 1967–68.

He lost his place as number one when old rival from Rangers, Billy Ritchie, joined Thistle. After not featuring in the first team all season (his last game coming in a 0–0 draw at Airdrie in April 1968), he left in the summer of 1969. Niven retired from playing shortly after this.

=== International ===
Niven never played for the Scotland national football team. It is understood that he has played the most games for Rangers of any Scottish player who has not been capped by Scotland. Niven was selected twice for Scotland, but had to withdraw each time due to injury and was replaced by Frank Haffey. He did, however, represent the Scottish League XI seven times.

== Death ==
Niven died on 17 July 2008, aged 79.
