= Lawrie Leslie =

Scottish footballer (1935–2019)

Personal information
- Full name: Lawrence Grant Leslie
- Date of birth: 17 March 1935
- Place of birth: Edinburgh, Scotland
- Date of death: 4 June 2019 (aged 84)
- Position: Goalkeeper

Youth career
- Newtongrange Star

Senior career*
Years	Team	Apps	(Gls)
1956–1959	Hibernian	75	(0)
1959–1961	Airdrieonians	42	(0)
1961–1963	West Ham United	57	(0)
1963–1966	Stoke City	78	(0)
1966–1968	Millwall	67	(0)
1968–1969	Southend United	13	(0)
Total		332	(0)

International career
1960–1961	Scottish Football League XI	3	(0)
1960–1961	Scotland	5	(0)
1961	SFA trial v SFL	1	(0)
- * Club domestic league appearances and goals

Lawrence Grant Leslie (17 March 1935 – 4 June 2019) was a Scottish professional footballer who played as a goalkeeper for Hibernian, Airdrie, West Ham United, Stoke City, Millwall and Southend United. Internationally, he represented Scotland on five occasions.

== Early life ==
Leslie was born in Edinburgh. As a boy, he was run over by a truck and advised by doctors that he may not regain the ability to walk.

== Playing career ==
=== In Scotland ===
Leslie began playing football with Hawkhill Amateurs. In the early 1950s, he turned semi-pro and joined Newtongrange Star. He played for his regimental side at Oswestry after joining the Royal Artillery in 1956. Lawrie signed pro forms with Hibernian following a trial that Army compatriot and Hibs player Jock Buchanan had suggested he apply for. After initially competing for his place with Tommy Younger, he became the club's first choice 'keeper and was in the Hibs side that reached the 1958 Scottish Cup final, which they lost 1–0 to Clyde. After playing 98 matches for the Easter Road side he moved to Airdrie in November 1959 for £4,475. Leslie spent two seasons at Broomfield Park and became club captain. He was later inducted into the club's Hall of Fame.

=== In England ===
Leslie moved to West Ham United in 1961 for £14,000. He won 'Hammer of the Year' at the end of his first season, becoming the first goalkeeper to earn the accolade. The following season, Leslie suffered a broken leg in a game against Bolton Wanderers on 3 November 1962, but managed to regain fitness for the final four games of the campaign. After falling out of favour at West Ham at the start of the 1963–64 season – by this time Leslie's replacement, Jim Standen had established himself as the Hammers' first choice goalkeeper-, he requested a transfer.

After 61 league and cup appearances for the east London club, Leslie joined Stoke City for a fee of £14,000 in October 1963 and in his first season helped the club to reach the League Cup final. Leslie played in the first leg of the final at Stoke's Victoria Ground, a 1–1 draw, but he was injured for the decisive second leg. Reserve 'keeper Bobby Irvine stepped in and Stoke lost the game 3–2. In the 1964–65 season, Leslie made the number one spot his own as the missed just two matches out of 50. He lost his first choice status in 1965–66 due to the emergence of John Farmer and he left in the summer of 1966 for Millwall. He spent two seasons at The Den before finishing his career with Southend United.

=== International ===
Leslie won five caps for the Scotland national team while with Airdrie, all during the 1960–61 season. His international debut came on 22 October 1960, against Wales; Scotland lost the game 2–0, but his performance earned many plaudits. He was due to play for Scotland in the infamous 9–3 defeat by England at Wembley, but he was injured one week beforehand and Frank Haffey was selected instead.

== Later life ==
After his retirement from playing, Leslie coached at Southend and went on to a role as trainer-coach at Millwall. He was later involved in coaching schools football.

Leslie died in June 2019, aged 84.

== Career statistics ==
Appearances and goals by club, season and competition
Club	Season	League			FA Cup		League Cup		Total	
Club	Season	Division	Apps	Goals	Apps	Goals	Apps	Goals	Apps	Goals
Hibernian	1956–57	Scottish First Division	12	0	0	0	0	0	12	0
Hibernian	1957–58	Scottish First Division	33	0	7	0	6	0	46	0
Hibernian	1958–59	Scottish First Division	30	0	4	0	6	0	40	0
Hibernian	Total		75	0	11	0	12	0	98	0
Airdrieonians	1959–60	Scottish First Division	11	0	0	0	0	0	11	0
Airdrieonians	1960–61	Scottish First Division	31	0	0	0	0	0	31	0
Airdrieonians	Total		42	0	0	0	0	0	42	0
West Ham United	1961–62	First Division	37	0	1	0	1	0	39	0
West Ham United	1962–63	First Division	20	0	0	0	2	0	22	0
West Ham United	Total		57	0	1	0	3	0	61	0
Stoke City	1963–64	First Division	25	0	5	0	5	0	35	0
Stoke City	1964–65	First Division	41	0	3	0	4	0	48	0
Stoke City	1965–66	First Division	12	0	0	0	2	0	14	0
Stoke City	Total		78	0	8	0	11	0	97	0
Millwall	1966–67	Second Division	42	0	2	0	2	0	46	0
Millwall	1967–68	Second Division	25	0	1	0	2	0	28	0
Millwall	Total		67	0	3	0	4	0	74	0
Southend United	1968–69	Fourth Division	13	0	0	0	2	0	15	0
Career total			332	0	23	0	30	0	385	0

=== International ===
National team	Year	Apps	Goals
Scotland	1960	2	0
Scotland	1961	3	0
Total		5	0

== Honours ==
Stoke City

- Football League Cup runner-up: 1963–64
