= Robert McCann =

Robert McCann may refer to:

- Bob McCann (1964–2011), American basketball player
- Robert McCann (mathematician) (born 1968)
- Bert McCann (1932–2017, Robert Johnston McCann), Scottish footballer
