= Willie Neil =

Scottish footballer

Personal information
- Place of birth: Glasgow, Scotland
- Height: 5 ft 8 in (1.73 m)
- Positions: Right half; inside right

Senior career*
Years	Team	Apps	(Gls)
–	Parkhead		
1919–1928	Airdrieonians	229	(28)
1925	→ Third Lanark (loan)	4	(0)
1928–1930	Ayr United	30	(4)
1929–1930	→ Derry City (loan)		
1930	Cowdenbeath	2	(0)
1931–1932	Airdrieonians	6	(1)
Total		271	(43)

International career
1927	Scottish League XI	1	(0)
- * Club domestic league appearances and goals

William Neil was a Scottish footballer who played as a right half or inside right. He spent most of his career with Airdrieonians, initially playing in midfield before Tommy Preston became established in that position, then taking up a more advanced role after Willie Russell left the club. As well as contributing to the Diamonds sequence of four consecutive runners-up finishes in the Scottish Football League in the early 1920s, he was part of the squad that won the Scottish Cup in 1924, although he only played in one round and was not selected for the final. He also had short spells with Third Lanark (on loan from Airdrie), Ayr United, Derry City in Ireland (on loan from Ayr) and Cowdenbeath before returning to Airdrieonians for a short time prior to retiring.

Neil was selected for the Scottish Football League XI on one occasion, a 2–1 win over the Irish League representative team in October 1927. He had earlier played for Scotland at Junior level in his early career.
