= Jimmy McIntosh (footballer, born 1936) =

Scottish footballer

Personal information
- Full name: James Douglas McIntosh
- Date of birth: 3 August 1936
- Place of birth: Forres, Scotland
- Date of death: 2 October 2016 (aged 80)
- Place of death: Falkirk, Scotland
- Positions: Left half; left back

Senior career*
Years	Team	Apps	(Gls)
–	Forres Mechanics		
1955–1963	Falkirk	157	(2)
–	Forres Mechanics		

International career
1956–1958	Scotland U23	3	(0)
1958	SFL trial v SFA	1	(0)

Managerial career
- Forres Mechanics
- * Club domestic league appearances and goals

James Douglas McIntosh (3 August 1936 – 2 October 2016) was a Scottish footballer who played for Falkirk, primarily as a left half, although he was a versatile player and also featured as a left back. He was part of the Bairns squad which won the Scottish Cup in 1957, although he did not take part in the match itself, and played in three Scottish Football League fixtures over four days after the cup final to avoid relegation that season.

He played three times for Scotland under-23s and was in consideration for the full squad prior to the 1958 FIFA World Cup, playing in a trial match between a Scottish Football League XI team and a Scottish Football Association team; however shortly afterwards he suffered a knee injury which ruled him out at a crucial time.

Either side of his eight-year senior spell at Falkirk, he played for hometown team Forres Mechanics in the Highland League and also managed the club, leading them to a Scottish Qualifying Cup win soon after his arrival (the only time they claimed the trophy). In later life he alternated between the towns in various business ventures, particularly the development of public houses.
