= Alex Stewart (goalkeeper) =

Scottish footballer

Personal information
- Full name: Alexander Stewart
- Place of birth: Perth, Scotland
- Position: Goalkeeper

Senior career*
Years	Team	Apps	(Gls)
–	Perth Roselea		(0)
1908–1917	Falkirk	278	(0)
1916	→ Heart of Midlothian (loan)	1	(0)
1917–1918	Cowdenbeath		
1918–1920	Partick Thistle	32	(0)
1920	Vale of Atholl		
1920–1924	St Johnstone	63	(0)
1921	→ Falkirk (loan)	0	(0)
1924–1927	Arbroath	64	(0)

International career
1919	Scottish League XI	1	(0)
1916–1917	Scottish League (wartime)	2	(0)
- * Club domestic league appearances and goals

Alexander Stewart was a Scottish footballer who played as a goalkeeper. His longest spell was with Falkirk (winning the Scottish Cup with the Bairns in 1913), with other clubs including Partick Thistle, St Johnstone and Arbroath.

He was selected once for the Scottish Football League XI in 1919 while at Partick Thistle, having featured for the Scotland Junior international team in 1908 which helped to launch his career. On both occasions, his team were well beaten by their English opponents but Stewart was praised for his performance.

After retiring from playing he maintained an interest in sport: playing golf, owning a snooker and billiards hall in his hometown of Perth and introducing indoor lawn bowls greens to Arbroath.

Stewart's son, also named Alex, was also a footballer who played as a forward and was also capped once by the SFL XI.
