= Chris Shevlane =

Scottish footballer (1942–2023)

Personal information
- Date of birth: 6 May 1942
- Place of birth: Edinburgh, Scotland
- Date of death: 13 March 2023 (aged 80)
- Place of death: Glasgow, Scotland
- Position: Right-back

Youth career
- Edina Hearts
- Loanhead Mayflower

Senior career*
Years	Team	Apps	(Gls)
1962–1967	Heart of Midlothian	104	(1)
1967–1968	Celtic	2	(0)
1968–1971	Hibernian	66	(1)
1971–1974	Morton	38	(0)
Total		210	(2)

International career
1963–1964	Scotland U23	4	(0)
1964	SFL trial v SFA	1	(0)
1964	Scottish League XI	1	(0)
- * Club domestic league appearances and goals

Anthony Christopher Shevlane (6 May 1942 – 13 March 2023) was a Scottish footballer who played as a right-back for Hearts, Celtic, Hibernian and Morton.

After playing for Edina Hearts and Loanhead Mayflower, Shevlane started his professional career with Hearts. He made his competitive debut in April 1963 and earned international recognition with the Scotland under-23 team and the Scottish League XI. An ankle injury meant that Shevlane missed most of the 1966–67 season, and he was released by Hearts at the end of that season. He then signed for Celtic, but was unable to displace first-choice right-back Jim Craig and made just two league appearances for the club.

In 1968 Shevlane moved to Hibernian and he helped them reach the 1968–69 Scottish League Cup final, which they lost 6–2 to his previous club Celtic. He later played for Morton before his retirement from playing.

Shevlane later worked for a booksellers, and also ran Shevlane's Bar in the Springburn area of Glasgow. He died on 13 March 2023, at the age of 80.
