= John Cumming (Scottish footballer) =

Scottish footballer (1930–2008)

Personal information
- Date of birth: 17 March 1930
- Place of birth: Carluke, Scotland
- Date of death: 6 December 2008 (aged 78)
- Place of death: Carluke, Scotland
- Position: Wing half

Youth career
- Carluke Rovers
- 1948–1950: Heart of Midlothian

Senior career*
Years	Team	Apps	(Gls)
1950–1967	Heart of Midlothian	359	(36)

International career
1954–1957	Scotland B	2	(1)
1954–1960	Scotland	9	(0)
1955	Scotland A vs B trial	1	(0)
1955–1960	Scottish League XI	7	(1)
1959–1960	SFA trial v SFL	2	(0)
- * Club domestic league appearances and goals

John Cumming (17 March 1930 – 6 December 2008) was a Scottish footballer, who played as a wing half, spending his whole club career with Heart of Midlothian. He made 612 appearances and scored 58 goals for Hearts, and helped them win every major honour in Scottish football. Cumming also represented Scotland and the Scottish League.

== Club career ==
Cumming was signed for Heart of Midlothian on provisional forms by the then manager, Dave McLean. At the time Cumming was employed as a pit worker and playing junior league football for Carluke Rovers. Cumming signed fully for Hearts in January 1950. He was quickly dubbed the "Iron Man" for his fearless and resolute tackling. His versatility saw him play at either wing-half or left-back. He even appeared as a goalkeeper for one reserve match.

Dave Mackay had previously been on schoolboy terms at Hearts. Mackay joined the club's pro ranks in 1951. Cumming and Mackay became the duo who made that team tick for the remainder of the 1950s. "He never had a bad game. It was either a fairly good game or an excellent game," said Mackay of Cumming.

Cumming is the most decorated player in Hearts' history, having played throughout the club's most successful era. In nine seasons from 1954 to 1963 Hearts won seven trophies. He won two league championship medals, one Scottish Cup medal and four Scottish League Cup medals.

His commitment to the team is typified by his quote now displayed above the entrance to the players tunnel at Tynecastle: "Blood doesn't show on a maroon jersey". This was said after Cumming had blood streaming from a head injury in a clash with Willie Fernie in the 1956 Scottish Cup Final; he returned to the playing field and was named man of the match in a 3–1 win against Celtic. Despite his commitment, he retained control of his temper and was never booked in his career. He was the only player to collect medals for all seven of the trophies Hearts won in this period.

Cumming retired from playing in 1967. He was a trainer at Hearts for a decade after ending his playing days and later returned to work in the steel industry. Cumming remained a regular at Hearts games until illness confined him to a nursing home.

== International career ==
Cumming played nine times for Scotland, with his senior caps coming in two distinct spells. The first cap was a defeat at home to the 'Magical Magyars' era Hungary team in December 1954. This was a few weeks after Cumming won his first major trophy, and represented the first of four caps between December 1954 and May 1955. He then gained five further caps between April and June 1960, when his second league-winning campaign reached its conclusion.

He also represented the Scottish League XI.

== Personal life ==
Cumming and his wife Jane had a daughter, Jean, a son, James, and five grandchildren. He died on 6 December 2008.

The John Cumming Stadium in his home town of Carluke is named in his honour.

== See also ==
- List of one-club men in association football
