= Jock Finlay =

Scottish footballer

Personal information
- Full name: John Finlay
- Date of birth: 19 October 1882
- Place of birth: Kilmarnock, Scotland
- Date of death: 31 March 1933 (aged 50)
- Place of death: Newcastle upon Tyne, England
- Height: 5 ft 10 1/2 in (1.79 m)
- Position: Left half

Senior career*
Years	Team	Apps	(Gls)
–	Kilmarnock Shawbank		
1903–1904	Rangers	1	(0)
1904–1909	Airdrieonians	151	(10)
1909–1924	Newcastle United	153	(8)
Total		305	(18)

International career
1909	Scottish League XI	1	(0)
- * Club domestic league appearances and goals

John Finlay (19 October 1882 – 31 March 1933) was a Scottish footballer who played as a left half for Rangers (where he played only once in the Scottish Football League in his first season as a professional), Airdrieonians (where he became an established top division regular over five years), and Newcastle United (where he was registered as a player for 15 years, though World War I interrupted his career and the last few seasons involved only a handful of appearances – by then he was also working as a trainer for the club, a position he held until 1930).

Finlay was selected once for the Scottish Football League XI in 1909, and in 1920 played in the Home Scots v Anglo-Scots international trial match, but he never received a full cap for Scotland.
