= Dave Hilley =

Scottish footballer

Personal information
- Full name: David Hilley
- Date of birth: 20 December 1938 (age 87)
- Place of birth: Glasgow, Scotland
- Position: Inside forward

Senior career*
Years	Team	Apps	(Gls)
1957–1958	Pollok		
1958–1962	Third Lanark	117	(37)
1962–1967	Newcastle United	194	(31)
1967–1971	Nottingham Forest	88	(14)
1971–1973	Highlands Power		
1973	Arcadia Shepherds		
1974–1975	Hellenic		
1975–1976	Hamilton Academical	0	(0)
1976	Scarborough		
1976–1977	South Shields		
1977–1978	Bedlington Colliery Welfare		

International career
1959	Scottish League XI	1	(0)
1961–1962	SFA trial v SFL	2	(1)
1961	Scotland U23	1	(0)
- * Club domestic league appearances and goals

David Hilley (born 20 December 1938 in Glasgow) is a Scottish former footballer, who played for Third Lanark, Newcastle United and Nottingham Forest. After leaving Forest, Hilley emigrated to South Africa, where he continued his football career, later returning to live in Newcastle-upon-Tyne.

Hilley represented the Scottish League once, in 1959.

His elder brother Ian was also a footballer; they briefly played together at Third Lanark, including in the 1959 Scottish League Cup Final at Hampden Park. They had grown up in Mount Florida, the Glasgow suburb situated between Hampden and Thirds Cathkin Park stadium.
