= Doug Baird (footballer, born 1935) =

Scottish footballer

Personal information
- Full name: Douglas Francis Hogg Baird
- Date of birth: 26 November 1935
- Place of birth: Falkirk, Scotland
- Date of death: December 2002 (aged 67)
- Place of death: Falkirk, Scotland
- Position: Defender

Youth career
- Armadale Thistle

Senior career*
Years	Team	Apps	(Gls)
1955–1961	Partick Thistle	139	(1)
1961–1963	Nottingham Forest	32	(0)
1963–1968	Plymouth Argyle	148	(1)
1968–1970	Tavistock	–	(–)
1970–1971	Hamilton Academical	2	(0)
Total		321	(2)

International career
1958	Scotland U23	1	(0)
1959	SFL trial v SFA	1	(0)
1959	Scottish League XI	1	(0)
- * Club domestic league appearances and goals

Douglas Francis Hogg Baird (26 November 1935 – December 2002) was a Scottish professional footballer who played as a defender.

Baird was born in Falkirk. He began his career as an amateur with Armadale Thistle before joining Scottish Football League side Partick Thistle in 1955. He made 139 league appearances over the next six years, scoring once. In 1959, he won a cap for the Scottish under-23 side against Wales and represented the Scottish Football League against the League of Ireland. Baird moved to England in 1961 to play in the Football League for Nottingham Forest. In two years at the City Ground, he made 37 appearances and then signed for Plymouth Argyle. He made his debut in a 1–0 defeat at Sunderland in October 1963 and scored his first goal in a 1–0 win at Bury in October 1964. Baird played in 158 matches for Argyle, mostly as a full back, and scored two goals. He joined non-league side Tavistock in 1968, where he spent two years, and then returned to Scotland to take up a player-coach role with Hamilton Academical. He died in December 2002.

== Honours ==
Partick Thistle

- Glasgow Cup: 1960–61
