= Bob Preston =

Scottish footballer

Personal information
- Full name: Robert Preston
- Date of birth: 1895
- Place of birth: Loanhead, Scotland
- Date of death: May 1945 (aged 49–50)
- Place of death: Northern Ireland
- Positions: Wing half; centre half

Senior career*
Years	Team	Apps	(Gls)
–	Bathgate		
1914–1922	Heart of Midlothian	127	(9)
1922–1923	Torquay United		
1923–1928	Plymouth Argyle	143	(3)
1928–19??	Torquay United	15	(0)

Managerial career
- 1934–35: Sligo Rovers
- * Club domestic league appearances and goals

Robert Preston (1895 – May 1945) was a Scottish professional footballer who played in the Scottish League for Heart of Midlothian and in the Football League for Plymouth Argyle and Torquay United. He played as a wing half or centre half.

== Career ==
Preston signed for Heart of Midlothian from Bathgate F.C. shortly before the outbreak of the First World War. In November 1914 he was among the Hearts players who volunteered to join Sir George McCrae's new battalion of the Royal Scots. Military service took him away from Edinburgh for five years, so it was 1919 before he made his debut for Hearts in the Scottish League First Division. He remained with the club until the 1922–23 season.

Preston then came to England to play for Torquay United, then a Southern League club, and moved on to Third Division South club Plymouth Argyle in 1923. He made 147 appearances for the club in all competitions. His last game for Argyle came at the end of the 1927–28 season, and he returned to Torquay United, by then a Football League team, for the following season.

== Personal life ==
After retiring from playing, Preston moved to Ireland and became a publican. He died in 1945.

His elder brother Thomas was also a footballer who played for Airdrieonians and was selected for the Scottish League XI.
