= John Jackson (footballer, born 1885) =

Scottish footballer

Personal information
- Birth name: John Jackson Madden
- Date of birth: 5 September 1885
- Place of birth: Irvine, Scotland
- Position: Inside left

Senior career*
Years	Team	Apps	(Gls)
1906–1908	Irvine Victoria		
1908–1909	Ardeer Thistle		
1909	Irvine Meadow		
1909–1913	Clyde	112	(17)
1913–1919	Leeds City	54	(10)
1915–1916	→ Ayr United (loan)	19	(12)
1916–1917	→ Clyde (loan)	25	(4)
1917–1918	→ Celtic (loan)	21	(3)
1918	→ Celtic (loan)	6	(1)
1919	→ Clydebank (loan)	11	(0)
1919	Motherwell	6	(0)
1919–1922	Dundee	76	(2)
1920	→ Stevenston United (loan)		
Total		330	(49)

International career
1912	Scottish League XI	1	(0)
- * Club domestic league appearances and goals

John Jackson (born 5 September 1885) (Note: Several sources provide his full name as John Bertram Jackson, born in 1893, but research has confirmed this was a different person. He was also four years older than shown in most official records, including his marriage certificate and the 1911 census, although earlier census returns recorded his true age as confirmed in his birth certificate.) was a Scottish footballer who played for clubs including Clyde, Leeds City, Ayr United, Celtic and Dundee, mainly as an inside left although he could also perform at wing half.

In the early part of his career with Clyde, he appeared in the Scottish Cup finals of 1910 and 1912, finishing on the losing side on both occasions.

With the English Football League suspended during World War I, he returned to his native Ayrshire and played for several Scottish clubs on loan from Leeds City, while working in the Nobel Enterprises explosives factory, later serving in the Royal Scots Fusiliers. During one of these wartime spells, he was in the Celtic team which won the 1918 War Fund Shield, and appeared in six Scottish Football League matches as the club won the title, though it is doubtful that he would have been presented with a medal. The previous year he had been granted permission to turn out for Rangers on the same basis, but it appears he never played in a first team game for them, and soon joined Celtic instead.

Jackson played in the annual Home Scots v Anglo-Scots trial match in 1910 and was selected once for the Scottish Football League XI in 1912, but never received a full international cap.
