= John Rankin (1910s footballer) =

Scottish footballer

Personal information
- Place of birth: Scotland
- Position: Outside right

Senior career*
Years	Team	Apps	(Gls)
–	Strathclyde		
1909–1916	Third Lanark	146	(32)
1916–1920	Airdrieonians	108	(20)
Total		254	(52)

International career
1911	Scottish League XI	1	(0)
- * Club domestic league appearances and goals

John Rankin was a Scottish footballer who played as an outside right for Third Lanark and Airdrieonians.

In seven active seasons with Thirds (he made no appearances at all in the 1914–15 season, possibly due to commitments relating to World War I), he played in two Scottish Cup semi-finals (1912 and 1914), one Glasgow Cup final and two Charity Cup finals, but finished on the losing side on each occasion. In 1911 Rankin was selected once for the Scottish Football League XI and took part in the Home Scots v Anglo-Scots international trial,. He then represented the Glasgow FA in their annual challenge match against Sheffield the following year .
