= Willie Rankin (footballer, born 1895) =

Scottish footballer

Personal information
- Full name: William Rankin
- Date of birth: 1895
- Place of birth: Burnbank, Scotland
- Date of death: 1950 (aged 54–55)
- Place of death: South Africa
- Height: 5 ft 7 in (1.70 m)
- Position: Inside right

Senior career*
Years	Team	Apps	(Gls)
–1916	Burnbank Athletic		
1916–1917	Parkhead Juniors		
1917–1924	Motherwell	230	(54)
1924–1929	Cowdenbeath	168	(22)
1927	→ Peebles Rovers (loan)		
1929–1932	Clyde	79	(9)
- Montrose
- Benoni

International career
1919–1923	Scottish League XI	4	(1)
- * Club domestic league appearances and goals

William Rankin was a Scottish professional football who made over 470 appearances in the Scottish Football League's top division for Motherwell, Cowdenbeath and Clyde, playing at inside right.

He represented the Scottish Football League XI four times and played in two of the annual Home Scots v Anglo-Scots international trial matches, scoring in one, but this did not lead to a full cap for Scotland. In 1921 he was a member of the squad sometimes presented as 'Scotland' which toured North America, but this was organised by the Third Lanark club rather than the Scottish Football Association.

== Career statistics ==
Appearances and goals by club, season and competition
Club	Season	League			Scottish Cup		Total	
Club	Season	Division	Apps	Goals	Apps	Goals	Apps	Goals
Motherwell	1917–18	Scottish Division One	30	11	0	0	30	11
Motherwell	1918–19	Scottish Division One	30	5	0	0	30	5
Motherwell	1919–20	Scottish Division One	39	12	1	0	40	12
Motherwell	1920–21	Scottish Division One	36	6	7	1	43	7
Motherwell	1921–22	Scottish Division One	36	8	3	0	39	8
Motherwell	1922–23	Scottish Division One	27	6	5	0	32	6
Motherwell	1923–24	Scottish Division One	32	6	3	1	35	7
Motherwell	Total		230	54	19	2	249	56
Cowdenbeath	1924–25	Scottish Division One	35	4	1	0	36	4
Cowdenbeath	1925–26	Scottish Division One	29	0	1	0	30	0
Cowdenbeath	1926–27	Scottish Division One	35	7	2	1	37	8
Cowdenbeath	1927–28	Scottish Division One	31	5	1	1	32	6
Cowdenbeath	1928–29	Scottish Division One	38	6	2	1	40	7
Cowdenbeath	Total		168	22	7	3	175	25
Clyde	1929–30	Scottish Division One	35	4	2	1	37	5
Clyde	1930–31	Scottish Division One	29	5	3	2	32	7
Clyde	1931–32	Scottish Division One	15	0	0	0	15	0
Clyde	Total		79	9	5	3	84	12
Career total			477	85	31	8	508	93

== Honours ==
- Cowdenbeath Hall of Fame
