= Frank Haffey =

Scottish footballer

Personal information
- Full name: Francis Haffey
- Date of birth: 28 November 1938 (age 87)
- Place of birth: Glasgow, Scotland
- Position: Goalkeeper

Youth career
- 1955–1956: Campsie Black Watch
- 1956–1957: Celtic

Senior career*
Years	Team	Apps	(Gls)
1957–1964	Celtic	140	(0)
1964–1965	Swindon Town	4	(0)
1965–1969	St. George Budapest		
1970	Hakoah		

International career
1960	SFA trial v SFL	1	(0)
1960–1961	Scotland	2	(0)
- * Club domestic league appearances and goals

Francis Haffey (born 28 November 1938) is a Scottish former footballer who played as a goalkeeper for Celtic and the Scotland national team.

== Career ==
Remembered as one of Celtic's great and more eccentric keepers, Haffey made 201 appearances for the club in major competitions. He had 61 clean-sheets and was first-choice goalkeeper for five seasons but did not win any trophies apart from one minor Glasgow Cup in 1961–62, finishing on the losing side in the Scottish Cup finals of 1961 and 1963, both of which went to a replay.

After breaking an ankle in the Glasgow Cup against Partick Thistle in November 1963, effectively ending his Celtic career, he left the following October to play for Swindon Town. Soon thereafter, Haffey moved to Australia, where after a five-year spell as a footballer there he found his way into the entertainment business as a cabaret singer, and later operated a goalkeeping centre on the Gold Coast, Queensland.

=== International ===
On his full international debut Haffey saved a Bobby Charlton penalty in a 1–1 home draw versus England in 1960. In 1961, his second and final cap was also versus England. At Wembley, an inexperienced Scotland side featuring 4 debutants and averaging less than 6 full caps per player pre-kick off kept a high-scoring English attack at bay through large periods, and the game was poised at 5–3 with 12 minutes to go. However, two goals from Johnny Haynes, another from Bobby Smith and a third for Jimmy Greaves in the closing stages cemented Haffey's place in history. Scotland lost 9–3, leading to the humorous jibe from England fans: "What time is it?", "Almost ten past Haffey." Neither Haffey nor Motherwell's Bert McCann played for Scotland again.
