= James Reid (footballer, born 1890) =

Scottish footballer

Personal information
- Full name: James Greig Reid
- Date of birth: 1 May 1890
- Place of birth: Peebles, Scotland
- Date of death: 22 April 1938 (aged 47)
- Place of death: Airdrie, Scotland
- Positions: Centre forward; outside right

Senior career*
Years	Team	Apps	(Gls)
–	Peebles Rovers		
1909–1910	Partick Thistle	3	(0)
1910–1912	Lincoln City		
1912–1927	Airdrieonians	351	(120)
1927–1928	Clydebank	26	(1)

International career
1912–1919	Scottish League XI	5	(6)
1914–1924	Scotland	3	(0)
1915	SFL XI (wartime)	1	(1)
1916–1919	Scotland (wartime)	2	(1)
- * Club domestic league appearances and goals

James Greig Reid (1 May 1890 – 22 April 1938) was a Scottish footballer who played for Lincoln City, Airdrieonians and Clydebank.

While playing as a centre forward for Airdrie, he finished as the top scorer in Scottish Football League Division One in the 1912–13 and 1913–14 seasons; he converted to an outside right after World War I to accommodate the emerging Hughie Gallacher, and was on the wing in the team that won the Scottish Cup in 1924; the Diamonds were also runners-up in Division One four consecutive times in that period.

Reid was selected three times for the Scotland national team (plus two further unofficial wartime internationals) and also played for the Scottish Football League XI, scoring six times in five appearances (and another in a wartime fundraising match).
