= Alex Stewart (forward) =

Scottish footballer

Personal information
- Full name: Alexander Stewart
- Place of birth: Perth, Scotland
- Height: 5 ft 9 in (1.75 m)
- Position: Centre forward

Youth career
- Perth YMCA
- St Johnstone YMCA

Senior career*
Years	Team	Apps	(Gls)
1928–1929	Queen's Park	6	(1)
1929–1931	St Mirren	67	(23)
1931–1932	Sheffield United		
1932–1935	St Johnstone	69	(21)
1935–1936	Rhyl Athletic		
1936–1938	Motherwell	65	(51)
1938–1940	Falkirk	19	(13)
1940	Dumbarton (wartime)		
1944–1945	Clapton Orient (wartime)		
1945	Dundee United (wartime)		
1946	Colchester United	1	(1)

International career
1929	Scotland amateur	1	(0)
1937	Scottish League XI	1	(0)
- * Club domestic league appearances and goals

Alexander Stewart was a Scottish footballer who played as a centre forward who played for several clubs, including St Johnstone and Motherwell.

His most enduring achievement was being the scorer of six goals in a Scottish Football League Division One match for Motherwell against Celtic in April 1937 – the match finished 8–0 and remains the Glasgow club's record margin of defeat. Stewart was called up for the Scottish League XI at the start of the following season and played against England's Football League XI, his sole appearance at that level, after impressing in a trial match two weeks earlier. He had been capped once by the Scotland amateur team in 1929 while establishing himself with St Mirren, and before that had been picked twice for the Scotland Junior international team in 1927.

He later coached hometown club St Johnstone for two seasons, working with Bobby Brown.

Stewart's father, also named Alex, was also a footballer who played as a goalkeeper and was also capped once by the SFL XI.
