= Walter Rutherford (footballer) =

Scottish footballer

Personal information
- Full name: Walter Couper Rutherford
- Date of birth: 14 January 1891
- Place of birth: Hutchesontown, Scotland
- Date of death: 1 December 1944 (aged 53)
- Place of death: Bridgeton, Scotland
- Position: Inside left

Senior career*
Years	Team	Apps	(Gls)
- Maryhill
- Yoker Athletic
1916–1919	Kilmarnock	52	(12)
1917	→ Rangers (loan)	1	(1)
1919–1920	Alloa Athletic		
1920–1922	Ayr United	12	(3)
1922–1924	Johnstone	27	(7)
1926	Johnstone	15	(2)
Total		109	(25)

International career
1917	Scottish League (wartime)	1	(0)
- * Club domestic league appearances and goals

Walter Couper Rutherford (14 January 1891 – 1 December 1944) was a Scottish footballer who played as an inside left. He joined Kilmarnock from the junior leagues during World War I and quickly made an impact, scoring a hat-trick against Rangers, playing one match on loan for Rangers a week later, and being selected for the Scottish Football League XI in a fundraising match, all in 1917. However, he sustained a serious injury midway through the next season, with a benefit match being arranged for him against Celtic in April 1919 to provide an income, as he had been unable to work or play football during that time. Rutherford did not play for Kilmarnock again but was able to make a comeback of sorts, firstly with non-league Alloa Athletic followed by Ayr United and then Johnstone, with a second, swansong spell there 18 months after his first ended.
