= Home Scots v Anglo-Scots =

Annual association football trial match

Home Scots v Anglo-Scots was an annual association football trial match organised by the Scottish Football Association between the 1890s and 1920s to examine the abilities of possible players for upcoming full British Home Championship internationals, primarily the 'Auld Enemy' England v Scotland fixture. Selection trials were commonplace among football federations, but this match was unusual in that its regular format consisted of players based in one country (the 'homes') facing a selection of those who had moved to another country (the 'Anglos'), in order to form a combined team to oppose that other country's natives in international play.

== Background ==
From the advent of modern football in the 1860s, the relationship between the sporting communities of England and Scotland was one of its defining factors beyond local level. The development of tactics, styles and practices was evidenced in matches between the national teams from the first unofficial meetings in 1870 followed by the first official international in 1872, through the adaption of the combination game (passing). The successful use of this style was exemplified by the 'Scotch Professors' who moved to England in increasing numbers, enticed south by payment for their services which was initially illicit but then legitimised with the introduction of professionalism in English football in 1885, with The Football League starting three years later – the pattern has continued ever since, due to the larger, more lucrative economic market for the sport in England and no legal barriers to employment between the countries as two parts of the United Kingdom.

The Scottish Association, at that time dominated by strictly amateur club Queen's Park, refused to select these 'treacherous mercenary' players for the national team, and (apart from the second-ever international in 1873 staged in London) selected only Scotland-based amateur players, with the attitude of suspicion and hostility towards the professionals echoed at least to a degree by the general population. The practice still continued even after the Scottish Football League was formed in 1890, after professionalism was officially adopted in Scotland in 1893, and after Scottish players in English teams were seen to be dominating the competitions south of the border, with large contingents in the Preston North End 'Invincibles' and Sunderland's 'team of all talents' among others.

== Inception ==
By 1896 Scotland had not beaten England in six attempts (analysis by the Glasgow Herald in 1894 regarding their chances to "regain the lost prestige" being particularly pessimistic in tone) and it was decided to allow English-based players to be considered for selection. The first 'Home Scots v Anglo-Scots' trial match to compare the abilities of the two sets of players was played at the first Ibrox Park on 25 March 1896. Five 'Anglos' were subsequently selected to face England at Celtic Park ten days later, and a 2–1 victory to win the championship suggested the change in policy had been a success. The Scots already had a superior record against the other British teams, Ireland and Wales, and continued to select only home-based players for those fixtures until the 1903 match against Wales and the 1906 match against Ireland – although there were still some all-home selections in the years afterwards.

The initial success of the Anglo-Scots policy was by no means universally popular, with the Scottish Referee stating in 1898 "we hope this season's events and experiences will kill the practice. Let Scotland stand or fall by her native and resident resources" (the 'events' centred around a defeat to England in which captain Jimmy Cowan, one of four 'Anglos' in the side and possibly the most successful addition from the process up to that point, played very poorly and was alleged to be hungover from alcohol). The enduring hostile attitude of the Scottish public towards England-based players was demonstrated by an open letter written by team captain Alex Raisbeck in 1907 defending their commitment in the face of public criticism that so many were being selected (following a clear Anglo victory in the trial match, nine of the team that played England at St James' Park that year were based in that country, with the other two from Hearts, meaning that for the first time – in the 97th full Scotland international – no Glasgow clubs were represented).

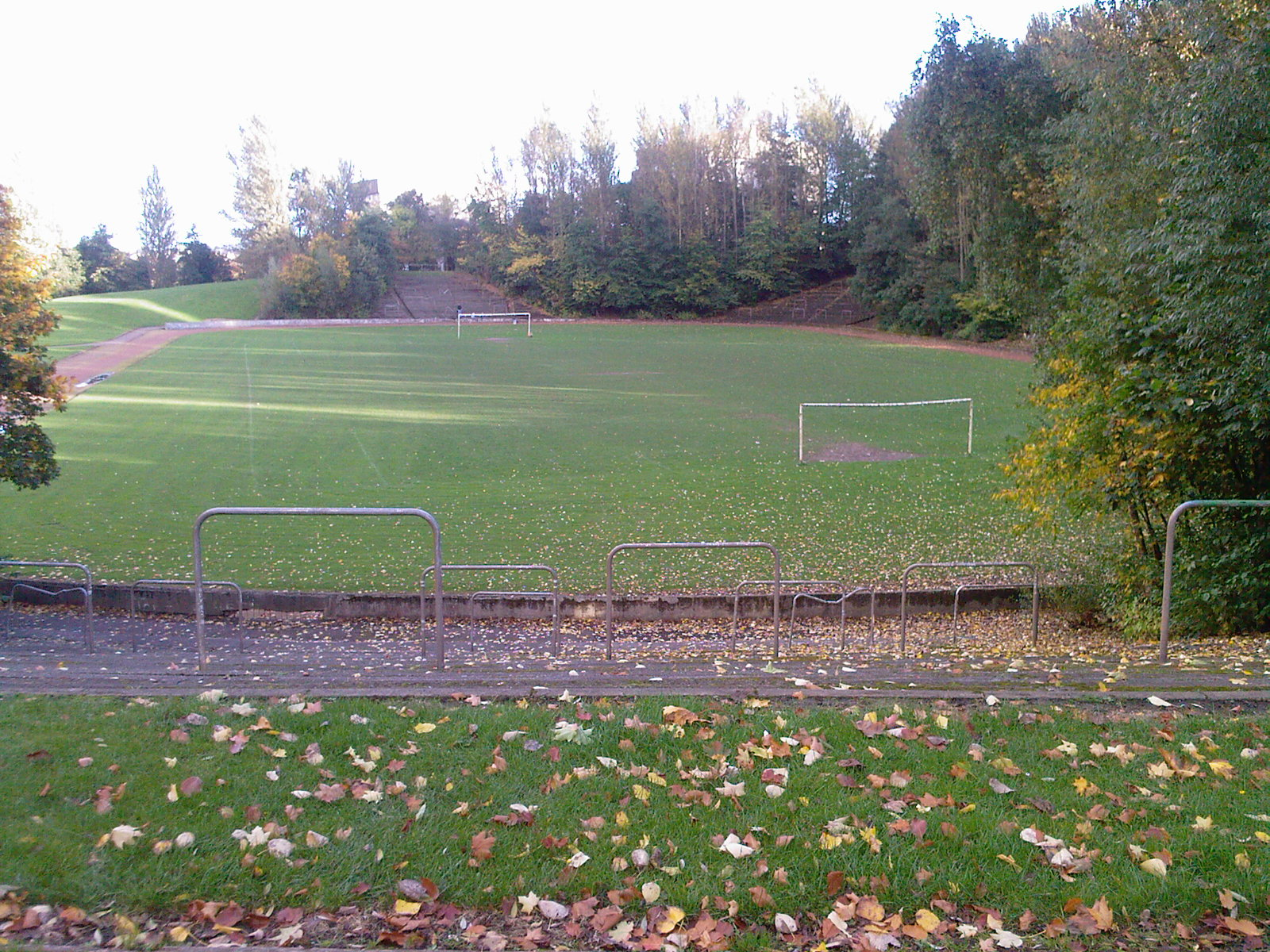
12 of the annual Home v Anglo matches were played at Cathkin Park

Despite the misgivings in some quarters, the annual springtime 'Home Scots v Anglo-Scots' matches – played in Glasgow and attended by crowds into five figures (with the sole exception of its second edition in 1897 at Tynecastle Park in Edinburgh) – continued until the mid-1920s, interrupted only by World War I when official international football was suspended. During the war one unofficial fundraising equivalent match was organised in 1917, with the Anglos composed of players contracted to English clubs but released to play in Scotland (where the League continued whilst the English version was suspended).

From 1896 to 1914, Scotland's record against England was seven wins, six draws and six defeats from their 19 meetings. However, while Scotland recorded two wins, one draw and a narrow 4–5 loss in their four post-war meetings with England, contemporary reports of the trials sometimes reported mismatched teams and/or varying levels of effort by some players which detracted from their purpose as an assessment of ability for the selection committee; this led the SFA to change to a 'Team A v Team B' basis drawn from a single pool in 1924 and 1925. They had previously used this format between the 1870s and 1898, the last three of which overlapped with the 'Anglo' fixture era and were used as a 'trial for a trial' involving only SFL players.

=== 1928 revival ===
There was no pre-England trial in 1926, with Scotland winning the Home Championship fixture, as they also had in 1925 (the 1924 match was drawn). But no trial followed by a defeat at Hampden in 1927 caused concern to the SFA. In 1928, with Scotland's strong record in the Home Championship having been dented by the defeat to England plus another to Ireland later that year, the Home v Anglos concept was revived briefly, although the trial match itself (played on a Tuesday afternoon) was reported as having drawn a small crowd and been played on a poor surface. Five of its participants were picked for the England match, four of whom had already been capped so it was no great leap to involve them. The sole debutant, centre-half Tom Bradshaw, was never selected for Scotland again despite his marking role on Dixie Dean which contributed to the team going down in folklore as the Wembley Wizards with a 5–1 win at Wembley. The side contained eight 'Anglos' (something which had angered supporters when the line-up was announced), but soon a dispute over the release of players from some English Football League clubs to national teams other than their own in 1930 caused the Scottish selectors to revert to a 'home' focus for some years, negating the purpose of a 'Home v Anglos' match (plus the fact that since the English clubs were not releasing their players for full internationals, they would not have done so for trials either). Even with the matter resolved, it was not until the 1938 fixture that as many as eight England-based players were chosen again.

== Tours and other concepts ==
Having already gone on tour to North America in 1927, the SFA opted to repeat the practice in 1935 and 1939 to test their candidates rather than arrange trials, and also began to organise an increasing number of friendly matches against European opponents at home and abroad, with 15 played between summer 1929 and the outbreak of World War II in autumn 1939.

After the war, another American tour in 1949 was followed by irregular trials against opposition such as the British Army and Scottish club sides. In the late 1950s and early 1960s, six annual trials were played between a 'Scotland XI' and a Scottish Football League XI, which in effect was similar to the old 'Home v Anglo' matches – a good portion of each 'Scotland XI' were based in England, and as the ranks of SFL clubs contained very few men who were not eligible for Scotland, its squad comprised all the best home-based players. The pre-1920s 'home' team was never officially presented as the SFL XI (and the League sometimes organised its own selection trials), but the SFL side for inter-league matches often closely mirrored that which had been picked for the 'Home v Anglos' trial games.

=== Newcastle charity matches ===
After the SFA trial was discontinued, between 1925 and 1933 several unofficial 'Anglo-Scots v Home Scots' matches were organised in aid the 'Robert Burns Statue Fund' charity, taking place in Newcastle-upon-Tyne and proceeds with proceeds going to the Princess Mary Maternity Hospital in that city, and to the Burns Memorial Cottages project in Mauchline; a high standard of players were involved, with each receiving a gold medal for their participation.

== List of matches ==
#	Date	Venue	Att.	Score	Home Scots scorers	Anglo-Scots scorers	Ref.	(England) Result
1	25 March 1896	Ibrox Park (I)	17,000	1–2	Alexander King	James Cowan, Jack Bell		W
2	22 March 1897	Tynecastle Park	5,000	1–2	Jimmy Miller	William Maxwell (2)		W
3	23 March 1898	Ibrox Park (I)	12,000	0–2		John Campbell, William Maxwell		L
4	28 March 1899	Cathkin Park (I)	6,000	3–1	R.C. Hamilton (3)	Jack Kennedy		L
5	21 March 1900	Cathkin Park (I)	8,000	2–1	Sandy McMahon, R.S. McColl	Jack Peddie		W
6	20 March 1901	Cathkin Park (I)	10,000	0–0				D
7	24 March 1902	Cathkin Park (I)	9,000	0–1		Ronald Orr (pen)		D
8	23 March 1903	Cathkin Park (I)	12,000	4–1	Finlay Speedie, Bobby Walker, R.C. Hamilton (2)	Andrew Wilson		W
9	21 March 1904	Meadowside	12,000	2–2	R.C. Hamilton, Jack Wilkie	Sandy Brown (pen), John May		L
10	20 March 1905	Cathkin Park (II)	10,000	2–0	Peter Somers, R.S. McColl			L
11	19 March 1906	Cathkin Park (II)	13,000	0–0				W
12	18 March 1907	Cathkin Park (II)	12,000	0–3		Walter White, George Stewart, Bill McPherson		D
13	23 March 1908	Cathkin Park (II)	19,000	0–3		Walter White (2), Andrew Wilson (pen)		D
14	22 March 1909	Cathkin Park (II)	16,000	3–1	Peter Somers, Jimmy McMenemy, Alexander Thomson	Willie Reid		L
15	21 March 1910	Ibrox Park (II)	6,000	0–4		David McLean, Jimmy Speirs, Sandy Higgins (2)		W
16	20 March 1911	Cathkin Park (II)	10,000	0–0				D
17	11 March 1912	Firhill Stadium	25,000	1–4	Duncan Ritchie	Andrew Wilson (2), David McLean (2)		D
18	18 March 1913	Cathkin Park (II)	15,000	0–0				L
19	16 March 1914	Cathkin Park (II)	16,000	2–2	Bob Mercer, James Reid	Walter Aitkenhead, David McLean		W
.	1915–1919	Not played due to World War I. Unofficial fundraising match played under the same format in 1917.						
20	30 March 1920	Cathkin Park (II)	12,000	2–1	Willie Rankin, Johnny Crosbie	John Paterson		L
21	22 March 1921	Cathkin Park (II)	32,000	2–1	Alex McNab, Andy Wilson	Tom Miller		W
22	22 March 1922	Cathkin Park (II)	16,000	1–1	Jock White	Johnny Crosbie		W
23	20 March 1923	Cathkin Park (II)	12,000	1–1	Jock White	Billy Birrell		D
.	1924–1927	Not played, other trial format used. Unofficial fundraising matches played under the same format.						
24	13 March 1928	Firhill Stadium	7,000	1–1	David McCrae	Tom Jennings		W
.	1929–1933	Not played. Unofficial fundraising matches played under the same format.						

== See also ==
- History of football in Scotland
- History of the Scotland national football team
- List of Scottish Football League representative players#Scotland trial matches / SFL Centenary players
- Scotland national football team results (unofficial matches)
- Scottish Exiles (rugby union)
