= John Anderson (footballer, born 1881) =

Scottish footballer

Personal information
- Full name: John Latto Anderson
- Date of birth: 1881
- Place of birth: Fowlis Wester, Scotland
- Date of death: 11 May 1942 (aged 60–61)
- Place of death: Falkirk, Scotland
- Position: Centre half

Senior career*
Years	Team	Apps	(Gls)
–	Dunfermline Athletic Juniors		
1901–1902	Dunfermline Athletic		
1902–1905	Heart of Midlothian	33	(0)
1905–1914	Falkirk	211	(6)
Total		244	(6)

International career
1911	Scottish League XI	1	(0)
- * Club domestic league appearances and goals

John Latto Anderson (1881 – 11 May 1942) was a Scottish footballer who played as a centre half. He began his career at Dunfermline Athletic and had three years at Heart of Midlothian, but spent the majority of his career with Falkirk. He was in the Bairns team that finished runners-up in the Scottish Football League in the 1907–08 and 1909–10, but played no part in the club's Scottish Cup win of 1913, having more or less retired due to injury by that point. He had played in the 1903 Scottish Cup Final with Hearts, losing out to Rangers after two replays.

Anderson was selected once for the Scottish Football League XI, playing against the Irish League XI in 1911.
