= Thomas Preston (footballer) =

Scottish footballer (1893–1971)

Personal information
- Date of birth: 1893
- Place of birth: Loanhead, Scotland
- Date of death: 1971 (aged 77–78)
- Place of death: Airdrie, Scotland
- Position: Right half

Senior career*
Years	Team	Apps	(Gls)
–	Loanhead Mayflower		
1921–1932	Airdrieonians	320	(7)

International career
1924	Scottish League XI	1	(0)
- * Club domestic league appearances and goals

Thomas Preston (1893 – 1971) was a Scottish footballer who played as a right half for Airdrieonians, spending his entire career with the club. He was a member of the Diamonds team that won the Scottish Cup in 1924. Preston was selected once for the Scottish Football League XI in the same year as the cup win, and took part in a trial match for the full Scotland team in 1925.

His younger brother Bob was also a footballer who played for Heart of Midlothian, Torquay United and Plymouth Argyle.
