= Alex McNeill =

Scottish footballer

Personal information
- Date of birth: c. 1875
- Positions: Outside left; left half

Senior career*
Years	Team	Apps	(Gls)
1894–1896	Port Glasgow Athletic	26	(15)
1896–1897	St Bernard's	17	(3)
1897–1898	Abercorn	10	(1)
1898–1906	Port Glasgow Athletic	116	(9)
Total		169	(28)

International career
1900	Scottish League XI	1	(0)
- * Club domestic league appearances and goals

Alexander McNeill was a Scottish footballer who played as an outside left in the early part of his career, and as a left half towards its end. He spent most of his playing days with Port Glasgow Athletic over two spells, winning the Scottish Division Two title in 1901–02 and playing his part in them retaining top-division status for the next four seasons. He also had short spells with St Bernard's and Abercorn.

McNeill was selected for the Scottish Football League XI on one occasion, a 6–0 win over the Irish League representative team in February 1900. He was the only serving Port Glasgow player to feature for the SFL XI.

He should not be confused with Daniel McNeill (possibly a relative) or Alexander Neil, both of whom played for Port Glasgow in the same era (Neil also played for Abercorn).
