= Bert McCann =

Scottish footballer

Personal information
- Full name: Robert Johnston McCann
- Date of birth: 15 October 1932
- Place of birth: Dundee, Scotland
- Date of death: 12 September 2017 (aged 84)
- Height: 1.75 m (5 ft 9 in)
- Position: Wing half

Youth career
- Dundee North End

Senior career*
| Years | Team | Apps | (Gls) |
| 1953–1954 | Dundee United | 27 | (4) |
| 1954–1956 | Queen's Park | 51 | (22) |
| 1956–1965 | Motherwell | 246 | (21) |
| 1965–1966 | Hamilton Academical | 26 | (2) |
| Total | | 350 | (49) |

International career
| 1959–1961 | SFL trial v SFA | 2 | (1) |
| 1959–1961 | Scotland | 5 | (0) |
| 1959–1961 | Scottish League XI | 5 | (1) |
| 1960 | SFA trial v SFL | 1 | (0) |
- * Club domestic league appearances and goals

Robert Johnston McCann (15 October 1932 – 12 September 2017) was a Scottish footballer, who played as a wing half for Dundee North End, Dundee United, Queen's Park, Motherwell, Hamilton Academical and Scotland. McCann represented Scotland and the Scottish League XI five times each between 1959 and 1961.
