= 1953 Scottish League Cup final =

- Event: 1953–54 Scottish League Cup
East Fife	Partick Thistle
3	2
- Date: 24 October 1953
- Venue: Hampden Park, Glasgow
- Attendance: 38,529

The 1953 Scottish League Cup final was played on 24 October 1953, at Hampden Park in Glasgow and was the final of the 8th Scottish League Cup competition. The final was contested by East Fife and Partick Thistle. East Fife won the match 3–2, thanks to goals by Frank Christie, Charlie Fleming and Ian Gardiner.

== Match details ==
24 October 1953

East Fife	3–2	Partick Thistle
Christie; Fleming; Gardiner	Report	McKenzie; Walker

Hampden Park, Glasgow
Attendance: 38,529
Referee: J. S. Cox

EAST FIFE :
GK	Johnny Curran
FB	Don Emery
FB	Sammy Stewart (c)
RH	Frank Christie
CH	Willie Finlay
LH	Danny McLennan
RW	Jackie Stewart
IF	Charlie Fleming
CF	Jimmy Bonthrone
IF	Ian Gardiner
LW	Andy Matthew
Manager:
Jerry Dawson

PARTICK THISTLE :
GK	Tom Ledgerwood
FB	Jimmy McGowan
FB	Bobby Gibb
RH	Willie Crawford
CH	Jimmy Davidson (c)
LH	Andy Kerr
RW	Johnny McKenzie
IF	Bobby Howitt
CF	Willie Sharp
IF	Alex Wright
LW	Jimmy Walker
Manager:
David Meiklejohn
