= 1953–54 British Home Championship =

Tournament details
- Host country: England, Ireland, Scotland and Wales
- Dates: 3 October 1953 – 3 April 1954
- Teams: 4

Final positions
- Champions: England
- Runners-up: Scotland

Tournament statistics
- Matches played: 6
- Goals scored: 28 (4.67 per match)
- Top scorer(s): (England) Nat Lofthouse (Wales) John Charles (3 each)

The 1953–54 British Home Championship was an international football tournament played between the British Home Nations during the 1953–54 season. This season's tournament also doubled as UEFA – Group 3 for 1954 FIFA World Cup qualification. England dominated the Championship, winning all three games and taking first place. After defeating Ireland, Scotland struggled against Wales before losing to England. Meanwhile, Ireland defeated Wales in Wrexham to clinch third place. England, together with second-placed Scotland, subsequently qualified for the 1954 FIFA World Cup.

== Results ==
3 October 1953

Ireland	1–3	Scotland
Lockhart 72' (pen.)		47', 69' Fleming; 89' Henderson

Windsor Park, Belfast
Attendance: 58,248
Referee: Arthur Edward Ellis (England)

10 October 1953

Wales	1–4	England
Allchurch 22'		45', 49' Wilshaw; 52', 53' Lofthouse

Ninian Park, Cardiff
Referee: Charlie Faultless (Scotland)

4 November 1953

Scotland	3–3	Wales
Brown 19'; Johnstone 42'; Reilly 58'		49', 88' Charles; 73' Allchurch

Hampden Park, Glasgow
Attendance: 71,413
Referee: Thomas Mitchell (Ireland)

11 November 1953

England	3–1	Ireland
Hassall 10', 60'; Lofthouse 75'		54' McMorran

Goodison Park, Liverpool
Referee: Robert Smith (Wales)

31 March 1954

Wales	1–2	Ireland
Charles 80'		1', 52' McParland

Racecourse Ground, Wrexham
Referee: Charlie Faultless (Scotland)

3 April 1954

Scotland	2–4	England
Brown 7'; Ormond 89'		13' Broadis; 50' Nicholls; 68' Allen; 83' Mullen

Hampden Park, Glasgow
Attendance: 134,892
Referee: Thomas Mitchell (Ireland)

== Table ==
Pos	Team	Pld	HW	HD	HL	HGF	HGA	AW	AD	AL	AGF	AGA	GD	Pts	England national football team	Scotland national football team	Northern Ireland national football team	Wales national football team
1	England (C)	3	1	0	0	3	1	2	0	0	8	3	+7	6		—	3–1	—
2	Scotland	3	0	1	1	5	7	1	0	0	3	1	0	3	2–4		—	3–3
3	Ireland	3	0	0	1	1	3	1	0	1	3	4	−3	2	—	1–3		—
4	Wales	3	0	0	2	2	6	0	1	0	3	3	−4	1	1–4	—	1–2	

(C) Champion

=== Ireland vs Scotland ===
(Northern Ireland) Ireland	1 – 3 (final score after 90 minutes)	Scotland
Manager: (Northern Ireland) Peter Doherty Team: GK - William Smyth; DF - Willie Cunningham; DF - Alf McMichael; MF - Danny Blanchflower; MF - Jimmy McCabe; MF - Wilbur Cush; FW - Billy Bingham; FW - Jimmy McIlroy; FW - Billy Simpson; FW - Charlie Tully; FW - Norman Lockhart; Substitutes: none Unused Substitutes: ? Scorers: 1-2 Norman Lockhart (72', pen.)	Half-time: 0-0 Competition: World Cup qualifier 1954 (Group 3) Date: Saturday; 3 October 1953 Kick off: 15:00 Venue: Windsor Park, Belfast Attendance: 58,248 Referee: Arthur Edward Ellis ENG Assistants: ? Match rules: 90 minutes one injured player can be substituted before half time	Manager: (Scotland) Andy Beattie Team: GK - George Farm; DF - George Young (capt.); DF - Sammy Cox; MF - Bobby Evans; MF - Frank Brennan; MF - Doug Cowie; FW - Willie Waddell; FW - Charlie Fleming; FW - John McPhail; FW - Jimmy Watson; FW - Jackie Henderson; Substitutes: none Unused Substitutes: ? Scorers: 0-1 Charlie Fleming (47'); 0-2 Charlie Fleming (69'); 1-3 Jackie Henderson (89')

=== Wales vs England ===
Wales	1 – 4 (final score after 90 minutes)	England
Manager: Team: GK - Ron Howells; DF - Walley Barnes; DF - Alf Sherwood; MF - Roy Paul; MF - Ray Daniel; MF - Ron Burgess; FW - Billy Foulkes; FW - Reg Davies; FW - John Charles; FW - Ivor Allchurch; FW - Roy Clarke; Substitutes: none Unused Substitutes: ? Scorers: 1-0 Ivor Allchurch (22')	Half-time: 1-1 Competition: World Cup qualifier 1954 (Group 3) Date: Saturday; 10 October 1953 Kick off: 15:00 Venue: Ninian Park, Cardiff Attendance: 61,000 Referee: Charlie Faultless SCO Assistants: ? Match rules: 90 minutes one injured player can be substituted before half time	Manager: (England) Walter Winterbottom Team: GK - Gil Merrick; DF - Tommy Garrett; DF - Bill Eckersley; MF - Billy Wright (capt.); MF - Harry Johnston; MF - Jimmy Dickinson; FW - Tom Finney; FW - Albert Quixall; FW - Nat Lofthouse; FW - Dennis Wilshaw; FW - Jimmy Mullen; Substitutes: none Unused Substitutes: ? Scorers: 1-1 Dennis Wilshaw (45'); 1-2 Dennis Wilshaw (49'); 1-3 Nat Lofthouse (52'); 1-4 Nat Lofthouse (53')

=== Scotland vs Wales ===
Scotland	3 – 3 (final score after 90 minutes)	Wales
Manager: (Scotland) Andy Beattie Team: GK - George Farm; DF - George Young (capt.); DF - Sammy Cox; MF - Bobby Evans; MF - Willie Telfer; MF - Doug Cowie; FW - John Mackenzie; FW - Bobby Johnstone; FW - Lawrie Reilly; FW - Allan Brown; FW - Billy Liddell; Substitutes: none Unused Substitutes: ? Scorers: 1-0 Allan Brown (19'); 2-0 Bobby Johnstone (42'); 3-1 Lawrie Reilly (58')	Half-time: 2-0 Competition: World Cup qualifier 1954 (Group 3) Date: Wednesday; 4 November 1953 Kick off: 14:45 Venue: Hampden Park, Glasgow Attendance: 71,378 Referee: Thomas Mitchell Ireland Assistants: ? Match rules: 90 minutes one injured player can be substituted before half time	Manager: Team: GK - Ron Howells; DF - Walley Barnes; DF - Alf Sherwood; MF - Roy Paul; MF - Ray Daniel; MF - Ron Burgess; FW - Billy Foulkes; FW - Reg Davies; FW - John Charles; FW - Ivor Allchurch; FW - Roy Clarke; Substitutes: none Unused Substitutes: ? Scorers: 2-1 John Charles (49'); 3-2 Ivor Allchurch (73'); 3-3 John Charles (88')

=== England vs Ireland ===
England	3 – 1 (final score after 90 minutes)	(Northern Ireland) Ireland
Manager: (England) Walter Winterbottom Team: GK - Gil Merrick; DF - Stan Rickaby; DF - Bill Eckersley; MF - Billy Wright (capt.); MF - Harry Johnston; MF - Jimmy Dickinson; FW - Stanley Matthews; FW - Harold Hassall; FW - Nat Lofthouse; FW - Albert Quixall; FW - Jimmy Mullen; Substitutes: none Unused Substitutes: ? Scorers: 1-0 Harold Hassall (10'); 2-1 Harold Hassall (60'); 3-1 Nat Lofthouse (75')	Half-time: 1-0 Competition: World Cup qualifier 1954 (Group 3) Date: Wednesday; 11 November 1953 Kick off: 14:30 Venue: Goodison Park, Liverpool Attendance: 40,000 Referee: Robert Smith WAL Assistants: ? Match rules: 90 minutes one injured player can be substituted before half time	Manager: (Northern Ireland) Peter Doherty Team: GK - William Smyth; DF - Len Graham; DF - Alf McMichael; MF - Danny Blanchflower; MF - William Dickson; MF - Wilbur Cush; FW - Billy Simpson; FW - Edward McMorran; FW - Billy Bingham; FW - Jimmy McIlroy; FW - Norman Lockhart; Substitutes: none Unused Substitutes: ? Scorers: 1-1 Edward McMorran (54')

=== Wales vs Ireland ===
Wales	1 – 2 (final score after 90 minutes)	(Northern Ireland) Ireland
Manager: Team: GK - Jack Kelsey; DF - Derek Sullivan; DF - Alf Sherwood; MF - Roy Paul; MF - Ray Daniel; MF - Ron Burgess; FW - Billy Foulkes; FW - Noel Kinsey; FW - John Charles; FW - Ivor Allchurch; FW - Roy Clarke; Substitutes: none Unused Substitutes: ? Scorers: 1-2 John Charles (80')	Half-time: 0-1 Competition: World Cup qualifier 1954 (Group 3) Date: Wednesday; 31 March 1954 Kick off: 17:00 Venue: Racecourse Ground, Wrexham Attendance: 32,817 Referee: Charlie Faultless SCO Assistants: ? Match rules: 90 minutes one injured player can be substituted before half time	Manager: (Northern Ireland) Peter Doherty Team: GK - Harry Gregg; DF - Len Graham; DF - Alf McMichael; MF - Danny Blanchflower; MF - William Dickson; MF - Bertie Peacock; FW - Billy Bingham; FW - Jackie Blanchflower; FW - Billy McAdams; FW - Jimmy McIlroy; FW - Peter McParland; Substitutes: none Unused Substitutes: ? Scorers: 0-1 Peter McParland (1'); 0-2 Peter McParland (52')

=== Scotland vs England ===
Scotland	2 – 4 (final score after 90 minutes)	England
Manager: (Scotland) Andy Beattie Team: GK - George Farm; DF - Mike Haughney; DF - Sammy Cox (capt.); MF - Bobby Evans; MF - Frank Brennan; MF - George Aitken; FW - John Mackenzie; FW - Bobby Johnstone; FW - Jackie Henderson; FW - Allan Brown; FW - Willie Ormond; Substitutes: none Unused Substitutes: ? Scorers: 1-0 Allan Brown (7'); 2-4 Willie Ormond (89')	Half-time: 1-1 Competition: World Cup qualifier 1954 (Group 3) Date: Saturday; 3 April 1954 Kick off: 15:00 Venue: Hampden Park, Glasgow Attendance: 134,544 Referee: Thomas Mitchell NIR Assistants: ? Match rules: 90 minutes one injured player can be substituted before half time	Manager: (England) Walter Winterbottom Team: GK - Gil Merrick; DF - Ron Staniforth; DF - Roger Byrne; MF - Billy Wright (capt.); MF - Harry Clarke; MF - Jimmy Dickinson; FW - Tom Finney; FW - Ivor Broadis; FW - Ronnie Allen; FW - Johnny Nicholls; FW - Jimmy Mullen; Substitutes: none Unused Substitutes:>1-1 Johnny Nicholls (50'); 1-3 Ronnie Allen (68'); 1-4 Jimmy Mullen (83')

England won the championship and along with Scotland they represented Great Britain in 1954 FIFA World Cup

== Squads and Stats ==
=== England ===
Head coach: (England) Walter Winterbottom

Pos.	Player	DoB	Games played	Goals	Minutes played	Sub off	Sub on	(Wales)	(Northern Ireland)	(Scotland)	Club
FW	Ronnie Allen	15 January 1929	1	1	90	0	0	-	-	90	(England) West Bromwich Albion
FW	Ivor Broadis	18 December 1922	1	1	90	0	0	-	-	90	(England) Manchester City
DF	Roger Byrne	8 February 1929	1	0	90	0	0	-	-	90	(England) Manchester United
MF	Harry Clarke	23 February 1923	1	0	90	0	0	-	-	90	(England) Tottenham Hotspur
MF	Jimmy Dickinson	24 April 1925	3	0	270	0	0	90	90	90	(England) Portsmouth F.C.
DF	Bill Eckersley	16 July 1925	2	0	180	0	0	90	90	-	(England) Blackburn Rovers
FW	Tom Finney	5 April 1922	2	0	180	0	0	90	-	90	(England) Preston North End
DF	Tommy Garrett	28 February 1927	1	0	90	0	0	90	-	-	(England) Blackpool F.C.
FW	Harold Hassall	4 March 1929	1	2	90	0	0	-	90	-	(England) Bolton Wanderers
MF	Harry Johnston	26 September 1919	2	0	180	0	0	90	90	-	(England) Blackpool F.C.
FW	Nat Lofthouse	27 August 1925	2	3	180	0	0	90	90	-	(England) Bolton Wanderers
FW	Stanley Matthews	1 February 1915	1	0	90	0	0	-	90	-	(England) Blackpool F.C.
GK	Gil Merrick	26 January 1922	3	0	270	0	0	90	90	90	(England) Birmingham City
FW	Jimmy Mullen	6 January 1923	3	1	270	0	0	90	90	90	(England) Wolverhampton Wanderers
FW	Johnny Nicholls	3 April 1931	1	1	90	0	0	-	-	90	(England) West Bromwich Albion
FW	Albert Quixall	9 August 1933	2	0	180	0	0	90	90	-	(England) Sheffield Wednesday
DF	Stan Rickaby	12 March 1924	1	0	90	0	0	-	90	-	(England) West Bromwich Albion
DF	Ron Staniforth	13 April 1924	1	0	90	0	0	-	-	90	(England) Huddersfield Town
FW	Dennis Wilshaw	11 March 1926	1	2	90	0	0	90	-	-	(England) Wolverhampton Wanderers
MF	Billy Wright	6 February 1924	3	0	270	0	0	90	90	90	(England) Wolverhampton Wanderers

=== Scotland ===
Head coach: (Scotland) Andy Beattie

Pos.	Player	DoB	Games played	Goals	Minutes played	Sub off	Sub on	(Northern Ireland)	(Wales)	(England)	Club
MF	George Aitken	28 May 1925	1	0	90	0	0	-	-	90	(England) Sunderland A.F.C.
MF	Frank Brennan	23 April 1924	2	0	180	0	0	90	-	90	(England) Newcastle United
FW	Allan Brown	12 October 1926	2	2	180	0	0	-	90	90	(England) Blackpool F.C.
MF	Doug Cowie	1 May 1926	2	0	180	0	0	90	90	-	(Scotland) Dundee F.C.
DF	Sammy Cox	13 April 1924	3	0	270	0	0	90	90	90	(Scotland) Rangers F.C.
MF	Bobby Evans	16 July 1927	3	0	270	0	0	90	90	90	(Scotland) Celtic F.C.
GK	George Farm	13 July 1924	3	0	270	0	0	90	90	90	(England) Blackpool F.C.
FW	Charlie Fleming	12 July 1927	1	2	90	0	0	90	-	-	(Scotland) East Fife F.C.
DF	Mike Haughney	10 December 1925	1	0	90	0	0	-	-	90	(Scotland) Celtic F.C.
FW	Jackie Henderson	17 January 1932	2	1	180	0	0	90	-	90	(England) Portsmouth F.C.
FW	Bobby Johnstone	7 September 1929	2	1	180	0	0	-	90	90	(Scotland) Hibernian F.C.
FW	Billy Liddell	10 January 1922	1	0	90	0	0	-	90	-	(England) Liverpool F.C.
FW	John Mackenzie	4 September 1925	2	0	180	0	0	-	90	90	(Scotland) Partick Thistle F.C.
FW	John McPhail	27 December 1923	1	0	90	0	0	90	-	-	(Scotland) Celtic F.C.
FW	Willie Ormond	23 February 1927	1	1	90	0	0	-	-	90	(Scotland) Hibernian F.C.
FW	Lawrie Reilly	28 October 1928	1	1	90	0	0	-	90	-	(Scotland) Hibernian F.C.
MF	Willie Telfer	26 October 1925	1	0	90	0	0	-	90	-	(Scotland) St Mirren F.C.
FW	Willie Waddell	7 March 1921	1	0	90	0	0	90	-	-	(Scotland) Rangers F.C.
FW	Jimmy Watson	16 January 1924	1	0	90	0	0	90	-	-	(England) Huddersfield Town F.C.
DF	George Young	22 October 1922	2	0	180	0	0	90	90	-	(Scotland) Rangers F.C.

=== Ireland ===
Head coach: (Northern Ireland) Peter Doherty

Pos.	Player	DoB	Games played	Goals	Minutes played	Sub off	Sub on	(Scotland)	(England)	(Wales)	Club
FW	Billy Bingham	5 August 1931	3	0	270	0	0	90	90	90	(England) Sunderland A.F.C.
MF	Danny Blanchflower	10 February 1926	3	0	270	0	0	90	90	90	(England) Aston Villa
FW	Jackie Blanchflower	7 March 1933	1	0	90	0	0	-	-	90	(England) Manchester United
DF	Willie Cunningham	20 February 1930	1	0	90	0	0	90	-	-	(Scotland) St Mirren F.C.
MF	Wilbur Cush	10 June 1928	2	0	180	0	0	90	90	-	(Northern Ireland) Glenavon F.C.
MF	William Dickson	15 March 1923	2	0	180	0	0	-	90	90	(England) Arsenal F.C.
DF	Len Graham	17 October 1925	2	0	180	0	0	-	90	90	(England) Doncaster Rovers
GK	Harry Gregg	25 October 1932	1	0	90	0	0	-	-	90	(England) Doncaster Rovers
FW	Norman Lockhart	4 March 1924	2	1	180	0	0	90	90	-	(England) Aston Villa
FW	Billy McAdams	20 January 1934	1	0	90	0	0	-	-	90	(England) Manchester City
MF	Jimmy McCabe	17 September 1918	1	0	90	0	0	90	-	-	(England) Leeds United
MF	Jimmy McIlroy	25 October 1931	3	0	270	0	0	90	90	90	(England) Burnley F.C.
DF	Alf McMichael	1 October 1927	3	0	270	0	0	90	90	90	(Scotland) Newcastle United
FW	Edward McMorran	2 September 1923	1	1	90	0	0	-	90	-	(England) Doncaster Rovers
FW	Peter McParland	25 April 1934	1	0	90	0	0	-	-	90	(England) Aston Villa
MF	Bertie Peacock	29 September 1928	1	0	90	0	0	-	-	90	(Scotland) Celtic F.C.
FW	Billy Simpson	12 December 1929	2	1	180	0	0	90	90	-	(Scotland) Rangers F.C.
GK	William Smyth	c.1925	2	0	180	0	0	90	90	-	(Northern Ireland) Distillery
FW	Charlie Tully	11 July 1924	1	0	90	0	0	90	-	-	(Scotland) Celtic F.C.

=== Wales ===
Head coach:

Pos.	Player	DoB	Games played	Goals	Minutes played	Sub off	Sub on	(England)	(Scotland)	(Northern Ireland)	Club
FW	Ivor Allchurch	16 October 1929	3	2	270	0	0	90	90	90	(England) Swansea Town
DF	Walley Barnes	16 January 1920	2	0	180	0	0	90	90	-	(England) Arsenal F.C.
MF	Ron Burgess	9 April 1917	3	0	270	0	0	90	90	90	(England) Tottenham Hotspur
FW	John Charles	27 December 1931	3	3	270	0	0	90	90	90	(England) Leeds United
FW	Roy Clarke	1 June 1926	3	0	270	0	0	90	90	90	(England) Manchester City
MF	Ray Daniel	2 November 1928	3	0	270	0	0	90	90	90	(England) Sunderland A.F.C.
FW	Reg Davies	27 May 1929	2	0	180	0	0	90	90	-	(England) Newcastle United
FW	Billy Foulkes	29 May 1926	3	0	270	0	0	90	90	90	(England) Newcastle United
GK	Ron Howells	12 January 1927	2	0	180	0	0	90	90	-	(England) Cardiff City
GK	Jack Kelsey	19 November 1929	1	0	90	0	0	-	-	90	(England) Arsenal F.C.
FW	Noel Kinsey	24 December 1925	1	0	90	0	0	-	-	90	(England) Birmingham City
MF	Roy Paul	18 April 1920	3	0	270	0	0	90	90	90	(England) Manchester City
DF	Alf Sherwood	13 November 1923	3	0	270	0	0	90	90	90	(England) Cardiff City
DF	Derek Sullivan	10 August 1930	1	0	90	0	0	-	-	90	(England) Cardiff City
