= 1958 Scottish League Cup final =

- Event: 1958–59 Scottish League Cup
Heart of Midlothian	Partick Thistle
5	1
- Date: 25 October 1958
- Venue: Hampden Park, Glasgow
- Attendance: 59,960

The 1958 Scottish League Cup final was played on 25 October 1958 at Hampden Park in Glasgow and it was the final of the 13th Scottish League Cup competition. The final was contested by Hearts and Partick Thistle. Hearts won the match 5–1, thanks to goals by Willie Bauld, Johnny Hamilton and Jimmy Murray.

== Match details ==
25 October 1958

Heart of Midlothian	5–1	Partick Thistle
Bauld 5', 28'; Murray 10', 38'; Hamilton 60'		Smith 46'

Hampden Park, Glasgow
Attendance: 59,960
Referee: Bobby Davidson

HEARTS:
GK	Gordon Marshall
FB	Bobby Kirk
FB	George Thomson
RH	Dave Mackay (c)
CH	Freddie Glidden
LH	John Cumming
RW	Johnny Hamilton
IF	Jimmy Murray
CF	Willie Bauld
IF	Jimmy Wardhaugh
LW	Ian Crawford
Manager:
Tommy Walker

PARTICK THISTLE :
GK	Tom Ledgerwood
FB	Joe Hogan
FB	Frank Donlevy
RH	David Mathers
CH	Jimmy Davidson
LH	Alex Wright
RW	Johnny McKenzie (c)
IF	Lawrie Thomson
CF	George Smith
IF	Davie McParland
LW	Tommy Ewing
Manager:
David Meiklejohn
