= 1956 Scottish League Cup final =

- Event: 1956–57 Scottish League Cup
Celtic	Partick Thistle

First match
Celtic	Partick Thistle
0	0
- Date: 27 October 1956
- Venue: Hampden Park, Glasgow
- Attendance: 59,000

Replay
Celtic	Partick Thistle
3	0
- Date: 31 October 1956
- Venue: Hampden Park, Glasgow
- Attendance: 31,000

The 1956 Scottish League Cup final was played on 27 October 1956 and replayed on 31 October 1956. Both matches were played at Hampden Park in Glasgow and it was the final of the 11th Scottish League Cup competition. The final was contested by Celtic and Partick Thistle. The first match ended in a goalless draw, necessitating the reply. Celtic won the replay match 3–0, thanks to a goal by Bobby Collins and two goals by John McPhail.

== Match details ==
27 October 1956

Celtic	0–0	Partick Thistle

Hampden Park, Glasgow
Attendance: 59,000

CELTIC:
GK	Dick Beattie
FB	Mike Haughney
FB	Sean Fallon
RH	Bobby Evans (c)
CH	John Jack
LH	Bertie Peacock
RW	Jimmy Walsh
IF	Bobby Collins
CF	John McPhail
IF	Charlie Tully
LW	Willie Fernie
Manager:
Jimmy McGrory

PARTICK THISTLE :
GK	Tom Ledgerwood
FB	Andy Kerr
FB	Bobby Gibb
RH	Peter Collins
CH	Jimmy Davidson
LH	David Mathers
RW	Johnny McKenzie (c)
IF	George Smith
CF	Joe Hogan
IF	Alex Wright
LW	Tommy Ewing
Manager:
David Meiklejohn

=== Replay ===
31 October 1956

Celtic	3–0	Partick Thistle
Collins; McPhail

Hampden Park, Glasgow
Attendance: 31,000
Referee: Jack Mowat

CELTIC:
GK	Dick Beattie
FB	Mike Haughney
FB	Sean Fallon
RH	Bobby Evans (c)
CH	John Jack
LH	Bertie Peacock
RW	Jimmy Walsh
IF	Bobby Collins
CF	John McPhail
IF	Charlie Tully
LW	Willie Fernie
Manager:
Jimmy McGrory

PARTICK THISTLE :
GK	Tom Ledgerwood
FB	Andy Kerr
FB	Bobby Gibb
RH	Peter Collins
CH	Willie Crawford
LH	David Mathers
RW	Johnny McKenzie (c)
IF	Alex Wright
CF	Joe Hogan
IF	Davie McParland
LW	Tommy Ewing
Manager:
David Meiklejohn
