= 1953–54 in Scottish football =

Division A champions
- Celtic

Division B champions
- Motherwell

Division C (North & East) champions
- Brechin City

Division C (South & West) champions
- Rangers 'A'

Scottish Cup winners
- Celtic

League Cup winners
- East Fife

Division C League Cup winners
- Partick Thistle 'A' or Rangers 'A'

Junior Cup winners
- Sunnybank

Scotland national team
- 1954 BHC

The 1953–54 season was the 81st season of competitive football in Scotland and the 57th season of the Scottish Football League.

== Scottish League Division A ==
Pos	Team	Pld	W	D	L	GF	GA	GD	Pts
1	Celtic	30	20	3	7	72	29	+43	43
2	Heart of Midlothian	30	16	6	8	70	45	+25	38
3	Partick Thistle	30	17	1	12	76	54	+22	35
4	Rangers	30	13	8	9	56	35	+21	34
5	Hibernian	30	15	4	11	72	51	+21	34
6	East Fife	30	13	8	9	55	45	+10	34
7	Dundee	30	14	6	10	46	47	−1	34
8	Clyde	30	15	4	11	64	67	−3	34
9	Aberdeen	30	15	3	12	66	51	+15	33
10	Queen of the South	30	14	4	12	72	58	+14	32
11	St Mirren	30	12	4	14	44	54	−10	28
12	Raith Rovers	30	10	6	14	56	60	−4	26
13	Falkirk	30	9	7	14	47	61	−14	25
14	Stirling Albion	30	10	4	16	39	62	−23	24
15	Airdrieonians	30	5	5	20	41	92	−51	15
16	Hamilton Academical	30	4	3	23	29	94	−65	11

Source: RSSSF

Champions: Celtic
Relegated: Airdrieonians, Hamilton Academical

== Scottish League Division B ==
Pos	Team	Pld	W	D	L	GF	GA	GD	Pts	Promotion or relegation
1	Motherwell	30	21	3	6	109	43	+66	45	Promotion to the 1954–55 Division A
2	Kilmarnock	30	19	4	7	71	39	+32	42	Promotion to the 1954–55 Division A
3	Third Lanark	30	13	10	7	78	48	+30	36	
4	Stenhousemuir	30	14	8	8	66	58	+8	36	
5	Morton	30	15	3	12	85	65	+20	33	
6	St Johnstone	30	14	3	13	80	71	+9	31	
7	Albion Rovers	30	12	7	11	55	63	−8	31	
8	Dunfermline Athletic	30	11	9	10	48	57	−9	31	
9	Ayr United	30	11	8	11	50	56	−6	30	
10	Queen's Park	30	9	9	12	56	51	+5	27	
11	Alloa Athletic	30	7	10	13	50	72	−22	24	
12	Forfar Athletic	30	10	4	16	38	69	−31	24	
13	Cowdenbeath	30	9	5	16	67	81	−14	23	
14	Arbroath	30	8	7	15	53	67	−14	23	
15	Dundee United	30	8	6	16	54	79	−25	22	
16	Dumbarton	30	7	8	15	51	92	−41	22	Relegated to the 1954–55 Division C South West Section

Source: "1953-1954 Division B - SPFL Archive". SPFL.

Promoted: Motherwell, Kilmarnock
Relegated: Dumbarton

== Scottish League Division C ==
Section	Winner	Runner-up
South-West	Rangers 'A'	Partick Thistle 'A'
North-East	Brechin City	Aberdeen 'A'

Promoted: Brechin City

== Cup honours ==
Competition	Winner	Score	Runner-up
Scottish Cup	Celtic	2–1	Aberdeen
League Cup	East Fife	3–2	Partick Thistle
Junior Cup	Sunnybank	2–1	Lochee Harp

== Other Honours ==
=== County ===
Competition	Winner	Score	Runner-up
Aberdeenshire Cup	Buckie Thistle		
Ayrshire Cup	Kilmarnock	5 – 1 *	Ayr United
East of Scotland Shield	Hearts	1 – 0	Hibernian
Fife Cup	East Fife	2 – 2	Raith Rovers
Forfarshire Cup	Dundee United	3 – 1	Arbroath
Glasgow Cup	Rangers	3 – 0	Third Lanark
Lanarkshire Cup	Motherwell	3 – 0	Hamilton
Renfrewshire Cup	Babcock & Wilcox	3 – 3	Morton
Stirlingshire Cup	Stirling Albion	2 – 1	Stenhousemuir

- * - aggregate over two legs

=== Highland League ===
Top Three
Pos	Team	Pld	W	D	L	GF	GA	GD	Pts
1	Buckie Thistle	28	21	4	3	93	38	+55	46
2	Elgin City	28	17	4	7	77	49	+28	38
3	Inverness Caledonian	28	15	4	9	79	64	+15	34

== Scotland national team ==
Scotland qualified for their first ever World Cup in 1954 which was held in Switzerland.

Date	Venue	Opponents	Score	Competition	Scotland scorer(s)
3 October 1953	Windsor Park, Belfast (A)	Northern Ireland	3–1	BHC / WCQG3	Charlie Fleming (2), Jackie Henderson
4 November 1953	Hampden Park, Glasgow (H)	Wales	3–3	BHC / WCQG3	Allan Brown, Bobby Johnstone, Lawrie Reilly
3 April 1954	Hampden Park, Glasgow (H)	England	2–4	BHC / WCQG3	Lawrie Reilly (2)
5 May 1954	Hampden Park, Glasgow (H)	Norway	1–0	Friendly	George Hamilton
19 May 1954	Ullevaal Stadium, Oslo (A)	Norway	1–1	Friendly	John Mackenzie
25 May 1954	Olympic Stadium, Helsinki (A)	Finland	2–1	Friendly	Willie Ormond, Bobby Johnstone
1954 World Cup
16 June 1954	Sportplatz Hardturm, Zurich (N)	Austria	0–1	WCG3	
19 June 1954	St. Jakob Stadium, Basel (N)	Uruguay	0–7	WCG3	

Key:

- (H) = Home match
- (A) = Away match
- BHC = British Home Championship
- WCQG3 = World Cup qualifying – Group 3
- WCG3 = World Cup – Group 3
