= Arsenal F.C.–Chelsea F.C. rivalry =

Rivalry between two English football clubs

Arsenal v Chelsea
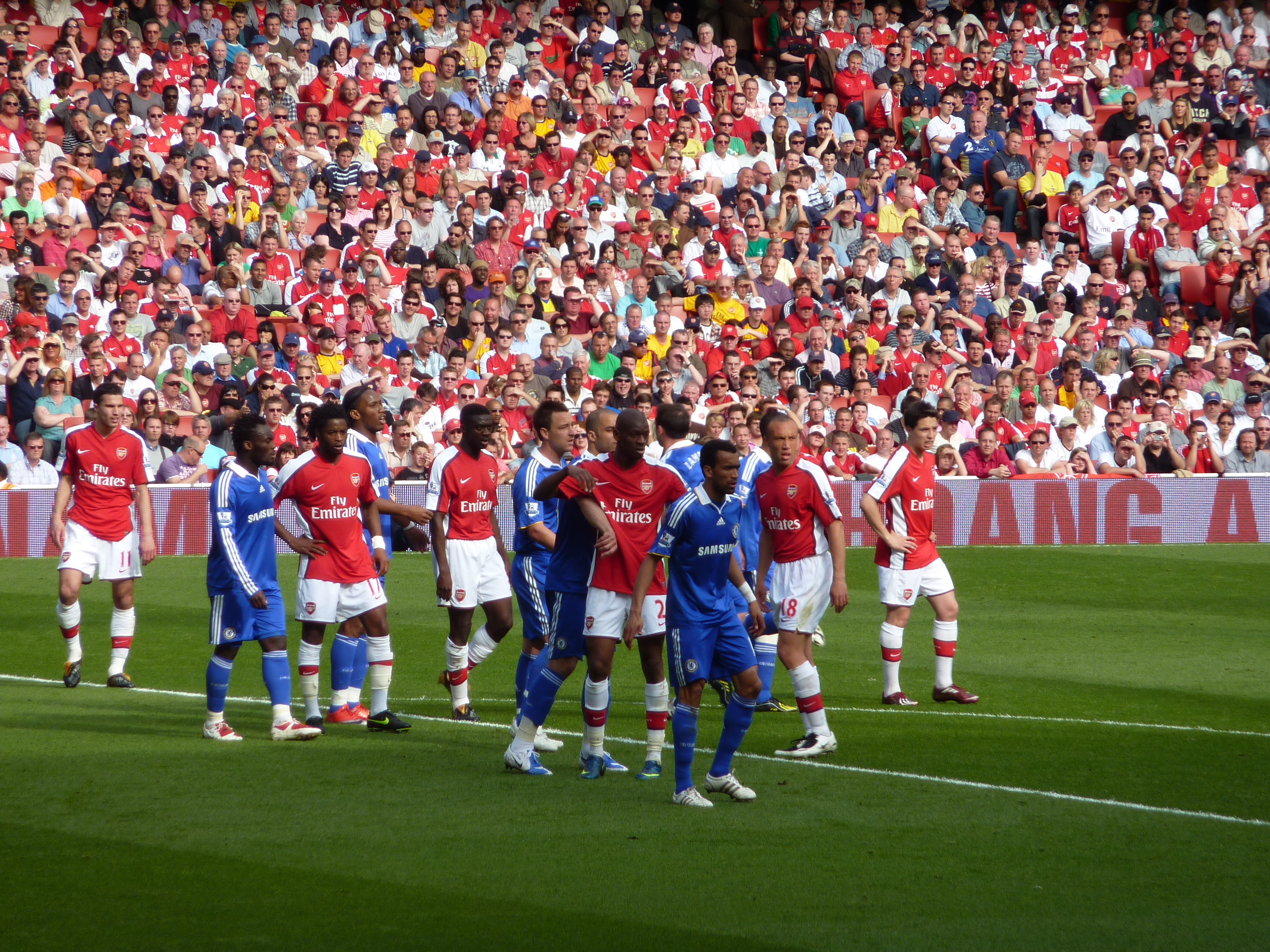
- Arsenal and Chelsea players prepare for a corner kick during a Premier League match in 2009.
- Other names: North West London derby
- Location: London
- Teams: Arsenal; Chelsea
- First meeting: 9 November 1907; Football League First Division; Chelsea 2–1 Arsenal
- Latest meeting: 6 September 2026; Premier League; Arsenal 2–1 Chelsea
- Next meeting: 13 March 2027; Premier League; Chelsea v Arsenal
- Stadiums: Emirates Stadium (Arsenal); Stamford Bridge (Chelsea)

Statistics
- Total meetings: 216
- Most wins: Arsenal (88)
- Top scorer: Didier Drogba (13)
- All-time series: Arsenal: 88; Drawn: 62; Chelsea: 66
- Largest victory: Chelsea 6–0 Arsenal; Premier League (22 March 2014)
- Location of the two teams' stadiums in London

The Arsenal F.C.–Chelsea F.C. rivalry is a rivalry between London-based professional association football clubs Arsenal Football Club and Chelsea Football Club. Arsenal play their home games at the Emirates Stadium, while Chelsea play their home games at Stamford Bridge.

Overall, Arsenal have won more games in the rivalry's history, having won 88 times to Chelsea's 66, with 62 draws as of match played on 6 September 2026. Arsenal's record win was a 5–0 victory in a Premier League match at Emirates Stadium on 23 April 2024, and Chelsea's record win was a 6–0 victory at Stamford Bridge in the Premier League on 22 March 2014. Didier Drogba holds the mark for the most derby goals with 13 in all competitions.

The clubs have contested five major finals: the 2002 FA Cup final, which Arsenal won 2–0, the 2007 League Cup final, which Chelsea won 2–1, the 2017 FA Cup final, which Arsenal won 2–1, the 2019 Europa League final, which Chelsea won 4–1, and the 2020 FA Cup final, which Arsenal won 2–1.

== Background ==
While they have never considered each other primary rivals, as two of the biggest and most successful clubs in London there has always been strong needle between the fans dating back to the 1930s. Matches between them would often attract large attendances.

The Arsenal and Chelsea rivalry has been more recently considered an important derby, after Chelsea's rise to the top class of the Premier League in the 2000s, when the two started to compete consistently for the Premier League title.

According to an internet survey of fans in December 2003, the Arsenal fans who responded to the survey said that they considered Chelsea as their third rival, after Manchester United and Tottenham Hotspur.

Those Chelsea fans who responded to the survey said that they considered Arsenal as their main rival, however Tottenham and Fulham are their more traditional rivals.

In a 2008 survey by the Football Fans Census, Arsenal fans named Chelsea as the club they disliked the most, ahead of their traditional rivals Tottenham. Chelsea fans have named Arsenal as their second-most disliked club, behind Liverpool. A 2014 Bleacher Report article ranks Arsenal as Chelsea's second-most hated rival.

== History ==
The first league meeting between the two teams took place on 9 November 1907 at Stamford Bridge. This was the first Football League First Division game played between two London clubs and drew a crowd of 65,000. A match between the clubs at Stamford Bridge in 1935 drew a crowd of 82,905, the second highest recorded attendance for an English league match. They met in two close contested FA Cup semi-finals in the 1950s, with Arsenal winning both times. In the 1960s Chelsea dominated the tie with 14 wins, two draws and just two losses during the decade.

The two teams have met in the quarter-finals of the 2003–04 UEFA Champions League, with Chelsea winning 3–2 on aggregate to go through to the semi-finals.

In 2006, the transfer of Ashley Cole from Arsenal to Chelsea further stoked the rivalry, as Cole had been caught meeting Chelsea officials months before.

The 2007 Football League Cup final was one of the most noted incidents. The game was marred by a fracas involving Frank Lampard, Cesc Fàbregas and others that resulted in yellow cards for the two and three other players sent off, the dismissal of Emmanuel Adebayor and incidents of Chelsea fans throwing celery at Arsenal players. This led the media to dub it the "Snarling Cup final". The match ended in a 2–1 victory for Chelsea.

On 27 December 2010, Chelsea came into the Emirates having beaten Arsenal five times in a row by a goal difference of 13–2, only for Arsenal to win the match 3–1.

On 29 October 2011, Arsenal won 5–3 at Stamford Bridge after coming from behind twice, with Robin van Persie scoring two late goals and completing his hat-trick. It is widely regarded as one of the most memorable and best games between the two sides.

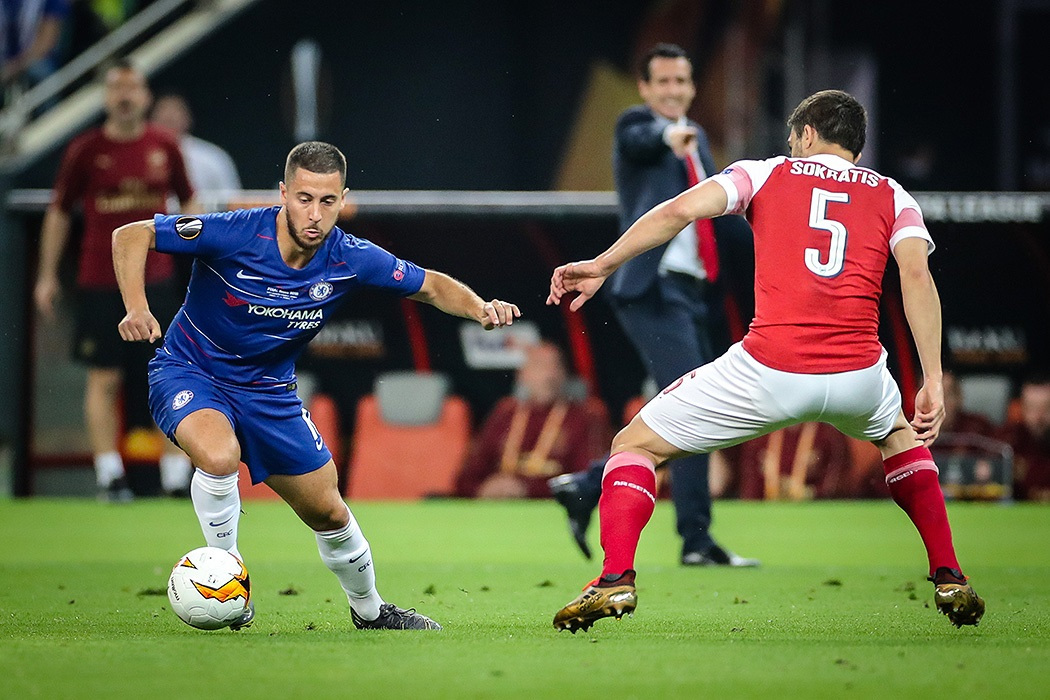
In May 2019, the two teams contested the UEFA Europa League final.

On 22 March 2014, in Arsène Wenger's 1,000th game in charge, Chelsea won 6–0. This marked the most goals Chelsea had scored against Arsenal, Chelsea's biggest margin of victory against Arsenal and the joint heaviest margin of defeat suffered by Wenger at Arsenal. Notable incidents in the match included Chelsea jumping out to a three-goal lead inside of 15 minutes, as well as the sending off of Kieran Gibbs by referee Andre Marriner for a handball committed by his teammate Alex Oxlade-Chamberlain.

On 5 October 2014, Chelsea beat Arsenal 2–0, which meant Arsenal manager Wenger had not won against José Mourinho in twelve attempts. This game also featured former Arsenal captain Cesc Fàbregas playing against his former club for Chelsea for the first time, recording an assist on Diego Costa's goal. The match, however, is most notable for a touchline fracas that occurred between the managers in the technical area during the fierce match. On 2 August 2015, Wenger finally recorded a win against Mourinho, defeating Chelsea 1–0 in the 2015 FA Community Shield.

On 24 September 2016, Arsenal beat Chelsea 3–0 at the Emirates Stadium. It was the first time Arsenal scored against Chelsea since 2013, and Arsenal's first win over The Blues since 2011 in the Premier League. All three goals were scored in the first half by Alexis Sánchez, Theo Walcott and Mesut Özil. It was Arsenal's biggest win over Chelsea since 1997.

The two teams have met in the 2017 FA Cup final, where Arsenal won their record 13th FA Cup trophy by defeating Chelsea 2–1. Arsenal repeated the feat in the 2017 FA Community Shield, winning 4–1 on penalties after the match ended 1–1. It was also the first time the "ABBA" penalty taking system has been used by The Football Association. On 29 May 2019, the two teams met in their first-ever European final, doing so in the Europa League, where Chelsea defeated Arsenal 4–1 to clinch their second title in the competition. The game was also the final career match of Petr Čech, who played for both teams between 2004 and 2019. The next season, Arsenal and Chelsea contested in another FA Cup final, which ended in a 2–1 victory for Arsenal with two goals by Pierre-Emerick Aubameyang, securing their 14th title.

In the 2020–21 Premier League, Arsenal completed their first Premier League "double" over Chelsea since 2003–04 after winning both games of the season.

== Players who have played for or managed both teams ==
Despite being rivals on the pitch, both Arsenal and Chelsea have maintained pragmatic business relations off it with frequent player transfers, including direct moves between the two clubs. This pattern of exchange reflects a mutual willingness to engage in high-level negotiations despite competitive tensions. By contrast, dealings involving Tottenham Hotspur are rare as both clubs have generally avoided conducting major transfer business with them. As of the 2025–26 season, at least 13 direct transfers have taken place between Arsenal and Chelsea since the start of the Premier League era, highlighting the unusual nature of their transactional openness for a rivalry in contrast to other club rivalries in England.

Below are the players and managers who played for or managed both clubs.

=== Arsenal, then Chelsea ===
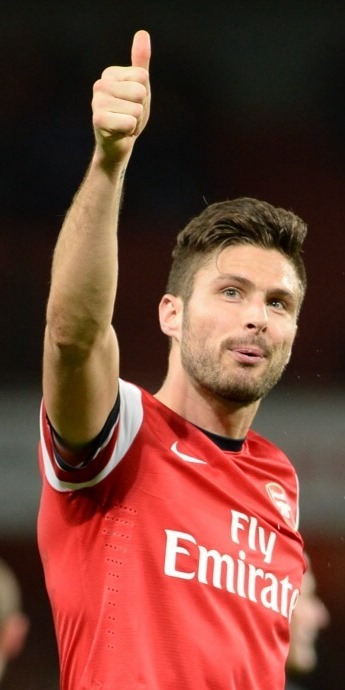
Olivier Giroud joined Arsenal in 2012 and became a pivotal player for the club, winning three FA Cups.

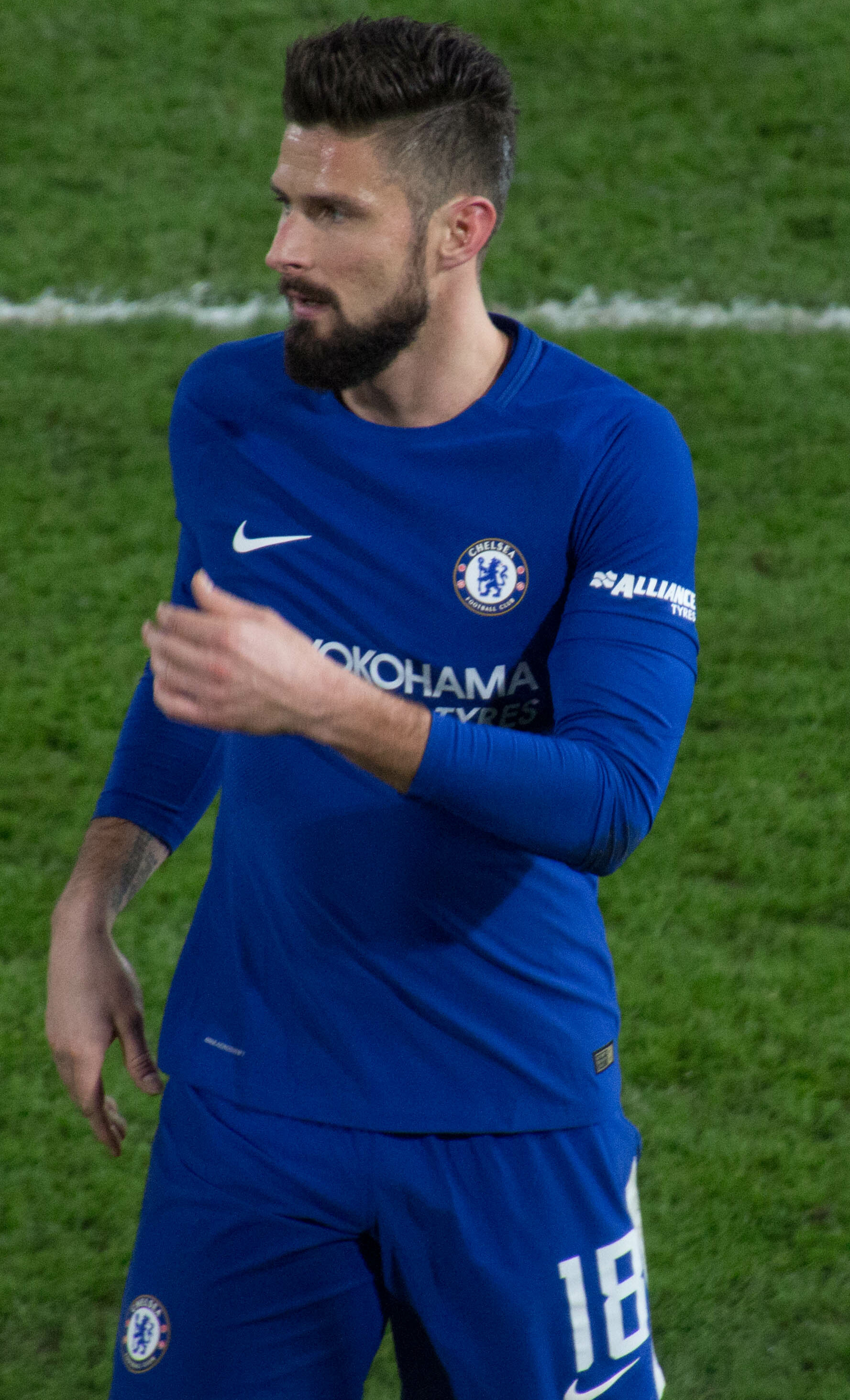
The Frenchman signed for Chelsea in 2018, beating his former club in the 2019 UEFA Europa League final.

- (Scotland) Sandy MacFarlane (as player: Arsenal 1896–1897; Chelsea 1913–1914)
- (Scotland) Jimmy Sharp (as player: Arsenal 1905–1908; Chelsea 1912–1915)
- (England) Leslie Knighton (as manager: Arsenal 1919–1925; Chelsea 1933–1939)
- (Scotland) Bob Turnbull (as player: Arsenal 1923–1924; Chelsea 1925–1928)
- (England) Ted Drake (as player: Arsenal 1934–1945; as manager: Chelsea 1952–1961)
- (Scotland) Tommy Docherty (as player: Arsenal 1958–1961; Chelsea 1961–1962; as manager: Chelsea 1961–1967)
- (England) Allan Young (as player: Arsenal 1959–1961; Chelsea 1961–1969)
- (England) Tommy Baldwin (as player: Arsenal 1964–1966; Chelsea 1966–1974)
- (England) Graham Rix (as player: Arsenal 1975–1988; Chelsea 1995)
- (England) Clive Allen (as player: Arsenal 1980; Chelsea 1991–1992)
- (Wales) Peter Nicholas (as player: Arsenal 1981–1983; Chelsea 1988–1991)
- (England) David Rocastle (as player: Arsenal 1984–1992; Chelsea 1994–1998)
- (France) Emmanuel Petit (as player: Arsenal 1997–2000; Chelsea 2001–2004)
- (France) Nicolas Anelka (as player: Arsenal 1997–1999; Chelsea 2008–2012)
- (England) Ashley Cole (as player: Arsenal 1999–2006; Chelsea 2006–2014)
- (Spain) Cesc Fàbregas (as player: Arsenal 2003–2011; Chelsea 2014–2019)
- (France) Olivier Giroud (as player: Arsenal 2012–2018; Chelsea 2018–2021)
- (Gabon) Pierre-Emerick Aubameyang (as player: Arsenal 2018–2022; Chelsea 2022–2023)
- (England) Danny Welbeck (as player: Arsenal 2014–2019; Chelsea 2026–present)
- (Argentina) Emiliano Martínez (as player: Arsenal 2012–2020; Chelsea 2026–present)

=== Chelsea, then Arsenal ===
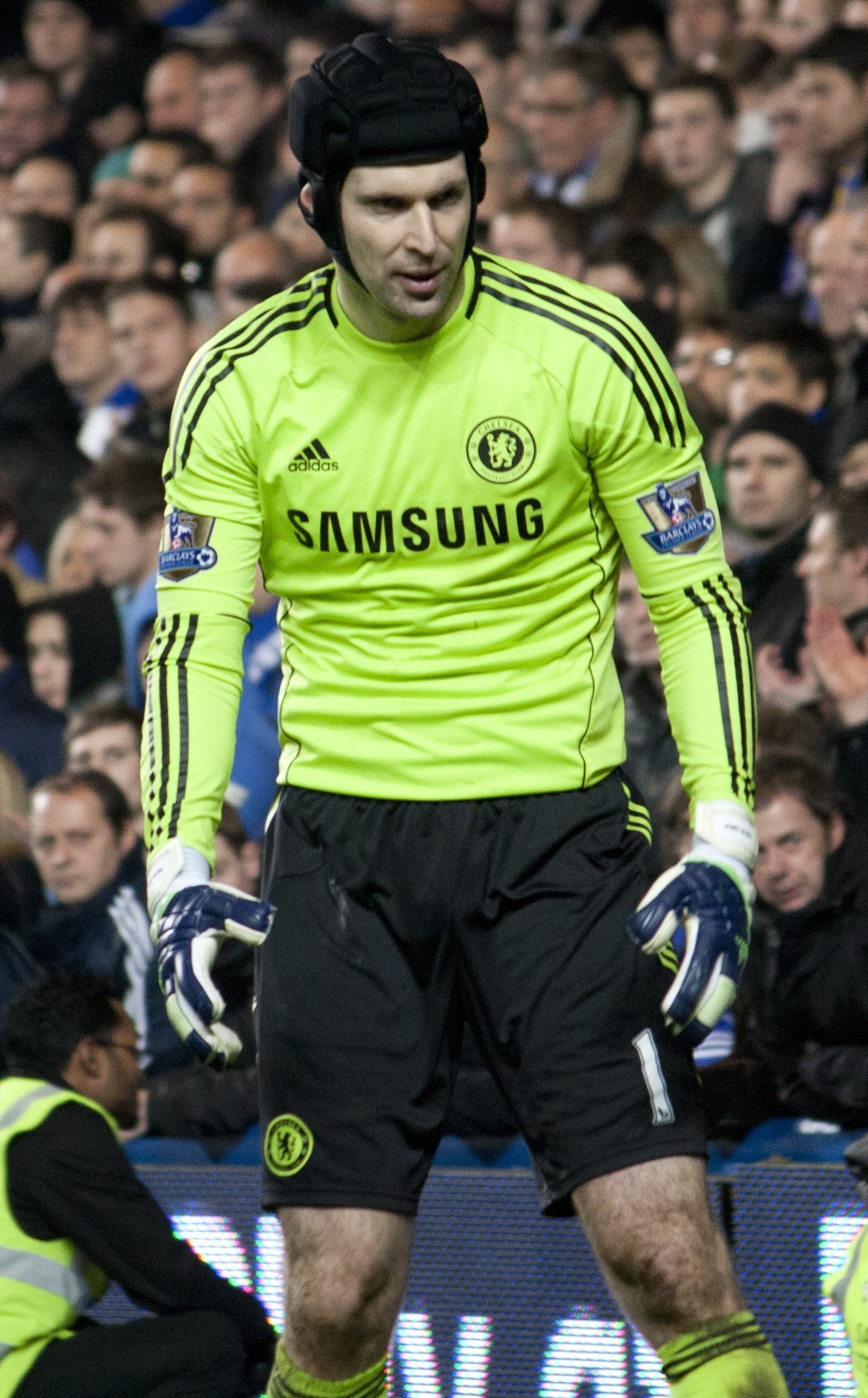
Chelsea signed Petr Čech in 2004. In his eleven-year spell with the club, he won four Premier League titles and the Champions League.

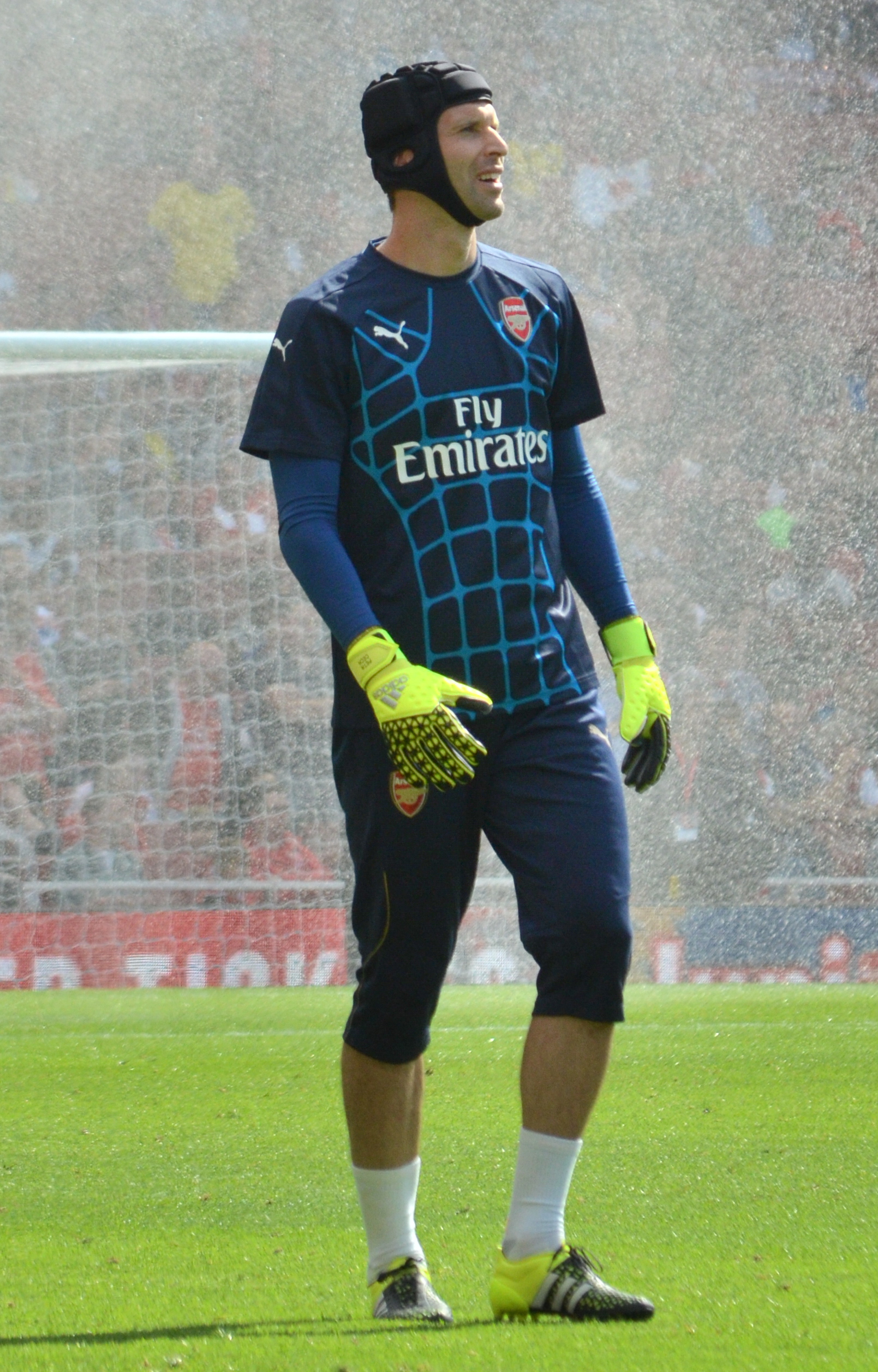
The Czech then signed for Arsenal in 2015. He was notably defeated by Chelsea in the 2019 Europa League final, which was also the final match of his career.

- (England) Tommy Lawton (as player: Chelsea 1945–1947; Arsenal 1953–1955)
- (Northern Ireland) Bill Dickson (as player: Chelsea 1947–1953; Arsenal 1953–1956)
- (England) John Hollins (as player: Chelsea 1963–1975 and 1983–1984; Arsenal 1979–1983; as manager: Chelsea 1985–1988)
- (Scotland) George Graham (as player: Chelsea 1964–1966; Arsenal 1966–1972; as manager: Arsenal 1986–1995)
- (Scotland) Stewart Houston (as player: Chelsea 1967–1972; as caretaker manager: Arsenal 1995 and 1996)
- (England) Alan Hudson (as player: Chelsea 1969–1974 and 1983–1984; Arsenal 1976–1978)
- (England) Colin Pates (as player: Chelsea 1979–1988; Arsenal 1990–1993)
- (France) William Gallas (as player: Chelsea 2001–2006; Arsenal 2006–2010)
- (France) Lassana Diarra (as player: Chelsea 2005–2007; Arsenal 2007–2008)
- (Israel) Yossi Benayoun (as player: Chelsea 2010–2013; Arsenal on loan 2011–2012)
- (Czech Republic) Petr Čech (as player: Chelsea 2004–2015; Arsenal 2015–2019)
- (Brazil) David Luiz (as player: Chelsea 2011–2014 and 2016–2019; Arsenal 2019–2021)
- (Brazil) Willian (as player: Chelsea 2013–2020; Arsenal 2020–2021)
- (Italy) Jorginho (as player: Chelsea 2018–2023; Arsenal 2023–2025)
- (Germany) Kai Havertz (as player: Chelsea 2020–2023; Arsenal 2023–present)
- (England) Raheem Sterling (as player: Chelsea 2022–2026; Arsenal on loan 2024–2025)
- (Spain) Kepa Arrizabalaga (as player: Chelsea 2018–2025; Arsenal 2025–present)
- (England) Noni Madueke (as player: Chelsea 2023–2025; Arsenal 2025–present)

== Honours ==
Arsenal's traditional home kit
Chelsea's traditional home kit
- Numbers with this background denote the competition record.

List of honours won by Arsenal and Chelsea
Arsenal	Competition	Chelsea
Domestic
14	First Division / Premier League	6
14	FA Cup	8
2	League Cup	5
18	FA Community Shield	4
48	Domestic total	23
International
—	UEFA Champions League	2
1	UEFA Cup Winners' Cup (defunct)	2
—	UEFA Europa League	2
—	UEFA Conference League	1
—	UEFA Super Cup	2
1	Inter-Cities Fairs Cup (defunct)	—
—	FIFA Club World Cup	2
2	International total	11
50	Total aggregate	34

== Head-to-head record ==
As of 6 September 2026

Competition	Matches	Arsenal wins	Draws	Chelsea wins
League	179	72	53	54
FA Cup	21	10	6	5
League Cup	10	5	1	4
UEFA Champions League	2	0	1	1
UEFA Europa League	1	0	0	1
FA Community Shield	3	1	1	1
Total	216	88	62	66

== Results ==
=== Premier League (1992–present) ===
Arsenal at home
Date	Score
3 October 1992	2–1
16 April 1994	1–0
15 October 1994	3–1
16 December 1995	1–1
4 September 1996	3–3
8 February 1998	2–0
31 January 1999	1–0
6 May 2000	2–1
13 January 2001	1–1
26 December 2001	2–1
1 January 2003	3–2
18 October 2003	2–1
12 December 2004	2–2
18 December 2005	0–2
6 May 2007	1–1
16 December 2007	1–0
10 May 2009	1–4
29 November 2009	0–3
27 December 2010	3–1
21 April 2012	0–0
29 September 2012	1–2
23 December 2013	0–0
26 April 2015	0–0
24 January 2016	0–1
24 September 2016	3–0
3 January 2018	2–2
19 January 2019	2–0
29 December 2019	1–2
26 December 2020	3–1
22 August 2021	0–2
2 May 2023	3–1
23 April 2024	5–0
16 March 2025	1–0
1 March 2026	2–1
6 September 2026	2–1

Chelsea at home
Date	Score
1 March 1993	1–0
20 November 1993	0–2
14 May 1995	2–1
30 September 1995	1–0
5 April 1997	0–3
21 September 1997	2–3
9 September 1998	0–0
23 October 1999	2–3
6 September 2000	2–2
8 September 2001	1–1
1 September 2002	1–1
21 February 2004	1–2
20 April 2005	0–0
21 August 2005	1–0
10 December 2006	1–1
23 March 2008	2–1
30 November 2008	1–2
7 February 2010	2–0
3 October 2010	2–0
29 October 2011	3–5
20 January 2013	2–1
22 March 2014	6–0
5 October 2014	2–0
19 September 2015	2–0
4 February 2017	3–1
17 September 2017	0–0
18 August 2018	3–2
21 January 2020	2–2
12 May 2021	0–1
20 April 2022	2–4
6 November 2022	0–1
21 October 2023	2–2
10 November 2024	1–1
30 November 2025	1–1
13 March 2027	

Summary
As of match played 6 September 2026

Arsenal wins	29
Draws	20
Chelsea wins	20
Arsenal goals	99
Chelsea goals	89
Total matches	69

Home record
Team	Home wins	Home draws	Home losses	GF	GA
Arsenal	19	9	7	56	38
Chelsea	13	11	10	51	43

== Highest attendances ==
- Arsenal 2–1 Chelsea: 89,472 (27 May 2017), Wembley (neutral)
- Arsenal 1–2 Chelsea: 88,103 (18 April 2009), Wembley (neutral)
- Arsenal 1–0 Chelsea: 85,437 (2 August 2015), Wembley (neutral)
- Arsenal 1–1 Chelsea: 83,325 (6 August 2017), Wembley (neutral)
- Chelsea 1–1 Arsenal: 82,905 (12 October 1935), Stamford Bridge (Chelsea home)
- Arsenal 2–0 Chelsea: 73,963 (4 May 2002), Millennium Stadium (neutral)
- Arsenal 1–2 Chelsea: 70,073 (25 February 2007), Millennium Stadium (neutral)
- Arsenal 1–1 Chelsea: 68,084 (5 April 1952), White Hart Lane (neutral)
- Chelsea 2–1 Woolwich Arsenal: 65,000 (9 November 1907), Stamford Bridge (Chelsea home)
- Arsenal 2–1 Chelsea: 62,746 (20 March 1973), Highbury (Arsenal home)

== See also ==
- Chelsea F.C.–Tottenham Hotspur F.C. rivalry
- North London derby
- West London derby
