= 1953–54 Scottish League Cup =

Tournament details
- Country: Scotland

Final positions
- Champions: East Fife
- Runners-up: Partick Thistle

The 1953–54 Scottish League Cup was the eighth season of Scotland's second football knockout competition. The competition was won by East Fife, who defeated Partick Thistle in the Final.

== First round ==
=== Group 1 ===
Team	Pld	W	D	L	GF	GA	GR	Pts
Hibernian	6	5	1	0	17	7	2.429	11
Falkirk	6	2	2	2	12	9	1.333	6
St Mirren	6	1	3	2	9	10	0.900	5
Queen of the South	6	1	0	5	5	17	0.294	2

Home team	Score	Away team	Date
Falkirk	1–1	St Mirren	8 August 1953
Queen of the South	0–4	Hibernian	8 August 1953
Falkirk	1–4	Hibernian	12 August 1953
St Mirren	3–2	Queen of the South	12 August 1953
Queen of the South	1–4	Falkirk	15 August 1953
St Mirren	2–2	Hibernian	15 August 1953
Hibernian	2–1	Queen of the South	22 August 1953
St Mirren	1–1	Falkirk	22 August 1953
Hibernian	2–1	Falkirk	26 August 1953
Queen of the South	1–0	St Mirren	26 August 1953
Falkirk	4–0	Queen of the South	29 August 1953
Hibernian	3–2	St Mirren	29 August 1953

=== Group 2 ===
Team	Pld	W	D	L	GF	GA	GR	Pts
East Fife	6	4	1	1	14	9	1.556	9
Aberdeen	6	3	0	3	14	12	1.167	6
Airdrieonians	6	3	0	3	11	14	0.786	6
Celtic	6	1	1	4	6	10	0.600	3

Home team	Score	Away team	Date
Airdrieonians	4–1	East Fife	8 August 1953
Celtic	0–1	Aberdeen	8 August 1953
Aberdeen	2–0	Airdrieonians	12 August 1953
East Fife	1–1	Celtic	12 August 1953
Airdrieonians	2–1	Celtic	15 August 1953
East Fife	2–0	Aberdeen	15 August 1953
Aberdeen	5–2	Celtic	22 August 1953
East Fife	5–1	Airdrieonians	22 August 1953
Airdrieonians	4–3	Aberdeen	26 August 1953
Celtic	0–1	East Fife	26 August 1953
Aberdeen	3–4	East Fife	29 August 1953
Celtic	2–0	Airdrieonians	29 August 1953

=== Group 3 ===
Team	Pld	W	D	L	GF	GA	GR	Pts
Rangers	6	5	1	0	22	4	5.500	11
Heart of Midlothian	6	2	2	2	11	9	1.222	6
Raith Rovers	6	3	0	3	8	11	0.727	6
Hamilton Academical	6	0	1	5	3	20	0.150	1

Home team	Score	Away team	Date
Heart of Midlothian	5–0	Hamilton Academical	8 August 1953
Raith Rovers	0–4	Rangers	8 August 1953
Hamilton Academical	1–2	Raith Rovers	12 August 1953
Rangers	4–1	Heart of Midlothian	12 August 1953
Heart of Midlothian	2–0	Raith Rovers	15 August 1953
Rangers	5–1	Hamilton Academical	15 August 1953
Hamilton Academical	1–1	Heart of Midlothian	22 August 1953
Rangers	3–1	Raith Rovers	22 August 1953
Heart of Midlothian	1–1	Rangers	26 August 1953
Raith Rovers	2–0	Hamilton Academical	26 August 1953
Hamilton Academical	0–5	Rangers	29 August 1953
Raith Rovers	3–1	Heart of Midlothian	29 August 1953

=== Group 4 ===
Team	Pld	W	D	L	GF	GA	GR	Pts
Partick Thistle	6	4	1	1	15	7	2.143	9
Dundee	6	4	1	1	17	10	1.700	9
Clyde	6	1	1	4	14	19	0.737	3
Stirling Albion	6	1	1	4	8	18	0.444	3

Home team	Score	Away team	Date
Dundee	6–1	Stirling Albion	8 August 1953
Partick Thistle	4–1	Clyde	8 August 1953
Clyde	2–4	Dundee	12 August 1953
Stirling Albion	3–0	Partick Thistle	12 August 1953
Clyde	4–1	Stirling Albion	15 August 1953
Dundee	1–1	Partick Thistle	15 August 1953
Clyde	2–3	Partick Thistle	22 August 1953
Stirling Albion	0–2	Dundee	22 August 1953
Dundee	4–2	Clyde	26 August 1953
Partick Thistle	3–0	Stirling Albion	26 August 1953
Partick Thistle	4–0	Dundee	29 August 1953
Stirling Albion	3–3	Clyde	29 August 1953

=== Group 5 ===
Team	Pld	W	D	L	GF	GA	GR	Pts
Third Lanark	6	4	0	2	25	9	2.778	8
Cowdenbeath	6	4	0	2	13	16	0.813	8
St Johnstone	6	3	0	3	12	9	1.333	6
Alloa Athletic	6	1	0	5	5	21	0.238	2

Home team	Score	Away team	Date
Alloa Athletic	0–10	Third Lanark	8 August 1953
St Johnstone	2–4	Cowdenbeath	8 August 1953
Cowdenbeath	2–1	Alloa Athletic	12 August 1953
Third Lanark	2–0	St Johnstone	12 August 1953
Cowdenbeath	4–2	Third Lanark	15 August 1953
St Johnstone	2–0	Alloa Athletic	15 August 1953
Cowdenbeath	2–1	St Johnstone	22 August 1953
Third Lanark	3–1	Alloa Athletic	22 August 1953
Alloa Athletic	3–1	Cowdenbeath	26 August 1953
St Johnstone	4–1	Third Lanark	26 August 1953
Alloa Athletic	0–3	St Johnstone	29 August 1953
Third Lanark	7–0	Cowdenbeath	29 August 1953

=== Group 6 ===
Team	Pld	W	D	L	GF	GA	GR	Pts
Ayr United	6	4	1	1	14	7	2.000	9
Stenhousemuir	6	3	1	2	14	10	1.400	7
Queen's Park	6	2	2	2	10	7	1.429	6
Albion Rovers	6	0	2	4	4	18	0.222	2

Home team	Score	Away team	Date
Ayr United	2–1	Stenhousemuir	8 August 1953
Queen's Park	4–0	Albion Rovers	8 August 1953
Albion Rovers	1–4	Ayr United	12 August 1953
Stenhousemuir	3–2	Queen's Park	12 August 1953
Queen's Park	0–0	Ayr United	15 August 1953
Stenhousemuir	4–0	Albion Rovers	15 August 1953
Albion Rovers	1–1	Queen's Park	22 August 1953
Stenhousemuir	4–2	Ayr United	22 August 1953
Ayr United	3–0	Albion Rovers	26 August 1953
Queen's Park	2–0	Stenhousemuir	26 August 1953
Albion Rovers	2–2	Stenhousemuir	29 August 1953
Ayr United	3–1	Queen's Park	29 August 1953

=== Group 7 ===
Team	Pld	W	D	L	GF	GA	GR	Pts
Kilmarnock	6	5	0	1	14	5	2.800	10
Motherwell	6	5	0	1	17	7	2.429	10
Morton	6	1	1	4	9	13	0.692	3
Dundee United	6	0	1	5	7	22	0.318	1

Home team	Score	Away team	Date
Morton	5–3	Dundee United	8 August 1953
Motherwell	3–0	Kilmarnock	8 August 1953
Dundee United	0–5	Motherwell	12 August 1953
Kilmarnock	1–0	Morton	12 August 1953
Kilmarnock	4–1	Dundee United	15 August 1953
Motherwell	2–0	Morton	15 August 1953
Dundee United	2–2	Morton	22 August 1953
Kilmarnock	4–1	Motherwell	22 August 1953
Morton	0–2	Kilmarnock	26 August 1953
Motherwell	3–1	Dundee United	26 August 1953
Dundee United	0–3	Kilmarnock	29 August 1953
Morton	2–3	Motherwell	29 August 1953

=== Group 8 ===
Team	Pld	W	D	L	GF	GA	GR	Pts
Dunfermline Athletic	6	4	0	2	16	8	2.000	8
Arbroath	6	3	1	2	10	7	1.429	7
Forfar Athletic	6	2	2	2	5	7	0.714	6
Dumbarton	6	1	1	4	6	15	0.400	3

Home team	Score	Away team	Date
Dunfermline Athletic	2–1	Arbroath	8 August 1953
Forfar Athletic	2–1	Dumbarton	8 August 1953
Arbroath	0–0	Forfar Athletic	12 August 1953
Dumbarton	1–3	Dunfermline Athletic	12 August 1953
Dumbarton	3–0	Arbroath	15 August 1953
Forfar Athletic	2–1	Dunfermline Athletic	15 August 1953
Arbroath	3–1	Dunfermline Athletic	22 August 1953
Dumbarton	0–0	Forfar Athletic	22 August 1953
Dunfermline Athletic	6–1	Dumbarton	26 August 1953
Forfar Athletic	1–2	Arbroath	26 August 1953
Arbroath	4–0	Dumbarton	29 August 1953
Dunfermline Athletic	3–0	Forfar Athletic	29 August 1953

== Quarter-finals ==
=== First leg ===
Home team	Score	Away team	Date
East Fife	6–2	Dunfermline Athletic	12 September 1953
Kilmarnock	4–3	Partick Thistle	12 September 1953
Rangers	4–2	Ayr United	12 September 1953
Third Lanark	0–4	Hibernian	12 September 1953

=== Second leg ===
Home team	Score	Away team	Date	Agg
Ayr United	3–2	Rangers	16 September 1953	5–6
Dunfermline Athletic	2–3	East Fife	16 September 1953	4–9
Hibernian	4–0	Third Lanark	16 September 1953	8–0
Partick Thistle	4–0	Kilmarnock	16 September 1953	7–4

== Semi-finals ==
Home team	Score	Away team	Date
East Fife	3–2	Hibernian	10 October 1953
Partick Thistle	2–0	Rangers	10 October 1953

== Final ==
24 October 1953

East Fife	3–2	Partick Thistle
Christie; Fleming; Gardiner		McKenzie; Walker

Hampden Park, Glasgow
Attendance: 38,529
