= Alex Wright (footballer, born 1930) =

Scottish professional footballer and manager

Personal information
- Full name: Alexander Deighton Wright
- Date of birth: 11 December 1930
- Place of birth: Oatlands, Glasgow, Scotland
- Date of death: 12 January 2000 (aged 69)
- Place of death: Linwood, Scotland
- Position: Inside forward

Youth career
- Avon Villa Juveniles
- 1948: Dalry Thistle

Senior career*
Years	Team	Apps	(Gls)
1948–1963	Partick Thistle	233	(52)
1963–1964	East Fife	32	(5)
Total		265	(57)

Managerial career
- 1966–1970: St Mirren
- 1970–1972: Dunfermline Athletic
- 1973–1977: Dumbarton
- 1986: Dumbarton (Caretaker)
- * Club domestic league appearances and goals

Alexander Deighton Wright (11 December 1930 – 12 January 2000) was a Scottish football player and manager.

== Early life ==
Alex Wright was born at his mother's family home in Elmfoot Street, Oatlands. His parents married in 1929 at St Francis RC Church in Hutchesontown, Glasgow, and he was an only child.

By the time he started school his parents had moved to McLean Street, Kinning Park, and his father was exhibiting symptoms of multiple sclerosis. Wright was initially enrolled in the elementary class at the closest school to his home, Lorne Street School, but after five months transferred to Kinning Park's RC primary school, Our Lady and St Margaret's in Stanley Street.

His father's health continued to deteriorate and circumstances dictated that Wright attend the nearest secondary school to his home; Lambhill Street School, Kinning Park, instead of accepting a place in senior secondary education at St Gerard's in Govan.

Wright himself was hospitalised with tuberculosis before leaving school and entering an apprenticeship as optical engineer. Until the age of 17, he played juvenile football with highly regarded Avon Villa at the Plantation pitches in Kinning Park.

Before agreeing to join Partick Thistle, Wright had previously rejected interest from Arsenal due to his father's failing health.

== Playing career ==
=== Partick Thistle ===
Provisionally signed by Partick Thistle at 17 and 'farmed out' to Ayrshire Junior side Dalry Thistle for season 1948–49, Wright played less than half a season, and only 11 games, for Dalry before being 'called up' to Firhill Park.

Expecting to play for Dalry the next day, Wright was summoned to Firhill on the evening of Friday 28 January 1949. Described in the Glasgow Evening Times as "brilliant" by Thistle's manager David Meiklejohn, he was asked to sign professional forms and told he would make his senior debut the following day. It was exactly seven weeks after his 18th birthday and he was fielded wearing the attacking number 8 shirt (inside-right) in front of a reported 60,000 fans in the Glasgow derby against Rangers at Ibrox Park. The game finished in a 2–2 draw, and Wright played in 7 of Thistle's remaining 10 league matches plus a home Scottish Cup tie against Queen of the South. He scored his first goal against Dundee in October 1949 but thereafter experienced his first prolonged absence as his father finally died from the effects of multiple sclerosis in December 1949, aged only 41. Wright returned to the Thistle side in February 1950 and played in every game to the end of the season.

Wright performed for Partick Thistle most of his playing career, being selected in four of the five forward positions (numbers 7 to 10), before converting to a more defensively minded wing-half position (numbers 4 and 6) later in his career. He even donned the goalkeeper's jersey on more than one occasion as an emergency measure during an era when injury substitutions were not yet permitted. His total statistics in all matches for Partick are given as 357 appearances and 91 goals.

His appearances were restricted during seasons 1950–51, 1951–52 and 1952–53 as he fulfilled his National Service with the Royal Scots in Germany. Despite this, and still no older than 21, he was flown home by Partick Thistle to play in important matches during this period. He was promoted to lance-corporal in the army and was captain of the British Army of the Rhine's select football team which also included future Scotland international goalkeeper Tommy Younger. National Service completed, Wright began 1953–54 as a first-team regular at Firhill and played 45 games in all competitions that season, scoring 24 goals. He appeared in the Scottish League Cup Finals of 1953, 1956 and 1958, each of which ended in defeat, and in 1959 captained the Glasgow Select to a 5–1 victory in its annual challenge match against the Sheffield Select.

Partick Thistle was one of the Scottish clubs to take part in an unofficial midweek 'British Floodlit League' over seasons 1955–56 and 1956–57; the fixtures were not all completed but Wright featured in the six matches played against Newcastle United and Tottenham Hotspur, scoring a 25-yard blockbuster in a 2–0 victory against Spurs at Firhill in November 1956 and being named man-of-the match. He also scored twice in an away friendly against Derby County in December 1953.

His leadership qualities were recognised by being appointed Thistle's captain for several seasons at a time when there were Scotland internationalists in the team. During his final season at Partick Thistle he played exclusively in the reserve side as a senior player / mentor. Seeing he was no longer part of the first-team plans at Firhill, Glasgow rivals Clyde bid £8000 for his services - Partick rejected this offer before later accepting East Fife's £4000 payment for his transfer in May 1963.

=== East Fife ===
Wright subsequently played as an almost ever-present during season 1963–64 in the Second Division, for East Fife under manager Jimmy Bonthrone, playing 41 league and cup matches and scoring 5 goals from his driving mid-field position. He was made captain by manager Bonthrone and led the Fifers to a League Cup quarter-final, where they held that season's treble-winning Rangers 1–1 at Bayview before losing narrowly 2–0 at Ibrox in the second-leg.

In the League, East Fife finished fourth behind promoted sides Morton and Clyde, and were second-highest scorers after Morton with a total 92 league goals. This was the club's highest League finish in the six seasons since its relegation in 1958. In achieving this, Wright's side was the only team to defeat runaway champions Morton in the 36-game campaign – winning 3–1 at Bayview on 1 February – and ending the Greenock side's record-breaking winning run of 25 league matches. The Fifers were also undefeated against Clyde, drawing 1–1 at Bayview and winning 3–1 at Shawfield. At the end of the season Wright decided to retire due to persistent knee injuries. He was 33. During his playing career, his appearance total and playing potential were disrupted by injuries. He suffered prolonged absences due to five knee cartilage surgeries as well as a toe amputation after it was crushed in a match.

== Coaching & Managerial Career ==
=== Clyde & Partick Thistle ===
After retiring as a player, Wright immediately gained employment using his coaching certificates. He worked for part-time clubs Clyde (throughout season 1964–65 under manager John Prentice) and Partick Thistle (from July 1965 until December 1966 under manager Willie Thornton). He was also the SFA appointed coach to Paisley & District Schools FA during this period.

Having previously failed to sign him as a player, and being further impressed by Wright's performances against them in the Second Division for East Fife, Clyde employed Wright in the role of trainer/coach. The Shawfielders had fine attacking players such as Harry Hood, Joe Gilroy, Alex Bryce, Sammy Reid and Jim McLean, and Wright helped them finish 7th in the First Division on 40 points, a record haul for a promoted side. This prompted Partick Thistle to invite him back to Firhill as trainer/coach to the first team. In hindsight it can probably be seen that Thistle were beginning a downward slide towards relegation in 1970, however in 1965–66 they finished level with Clyde on 30 points.

=== St Mirren ===
Wright was appointed full-time manager of St Mirren in December 1966, aged 35, on the recommendation of former Clyde and Scotland manager John Prentice whom St Mirren had initially approached for the role. As St Mirren's only other full-time employee was the groundsman, Wright was also responsible for the day-to-day administration of the part-time club; from answering the telephone and selling tickets, to compiling the match programme and ordering the match-day pies. In terms of his interaction with the players, however, he was St Mirren's first track-suit manager.

St Mirren had flirted seriously with relegation throughout the early 1960s and eventually succumbed at the end of that 1966–67 season despite having 19-year-old Archie Gemmill in the side, but Wright guided them to promotion back to the top flight at the first attempt. and with one of the division's best-ever performance records.

Back in the top division, and operating with a small squad of semi-professional players, St Mirren sat in 3rd position behind Celtic and Rangers following a run of only 3 defeats (away to Aberdeen, Celtic and Dunfermline Athletic) in the opening 22 matches, racking up 30 points in the process; i.e. a 68% points haul.

To have averaged even a point-per-game in the remaining fixtures would have comfortably broken the record points total for a promoted team achieved by his Clyde side 3 years earlier and ended St Mirren's season as high as 5th position. However, a sudden spate of injuries badly disrupted the small squad, leaving only 2 of the club's 16 players fit enough to play in every match to the end of the season. A meagre two draws was the eventual return from those 12 games, in which there were also 6 tight odd-goal defeats. Nevertheless, the side remained in contention for European qualification until its final home fixture such was quality of the first two-thirds of the campaign.

Arguably the most notable result of Wright's time at St Mirren came against Rangers on 16 November 1968. Newly promoted Saints were the last remaining undefeated side in Britain after the opening ten league fixtures, while Rangers arrived at Love Street on the crest-of-a-wave with newly signed Colin Stein having scored two successive League hat-tricks and a European double in his first three appearances. St Mirren won 1–0 in front of a reported 43,600, Love Street's largest attendance in two decades.

Bridging these first two full seasons of Wright's time at St Mirren, his team went a calendar year and 34 consecutive league fixtures undefeated, from 18 November 1967 to 23 November 1968. During a similar period, St Mirren also went 38 competitive home games undefeated, from 2 September 1967 to 11 January 1969. Both of these runs remain as club records, as does the 16 consecutive league victories from 18 November 1967 to 30 March 1968.

In 1969–70 season, the team suffered 'second season syndrome', and results were extremely inconsistent with away form particularly poor, until a flurry of points in the final 10 fixtures ensured top division status. Behind the scenes, however, a reserve side had been resurrected and Wright's signing policy introduced three future full Scotland internationals to the club in addition to four others who would go on to play in European competition after leaving St Mirren. Season 1970–71 began with six teenagers making appearances in the side, including Gordon McQueen, Iain Munro, Bobby McKean and Ally McLeod.

When he was approached to take over at Dunfermline Athletic in early October 1970 Wright's new-look Paisley side had won 8 points from an undefeated opening six league fixtures – against Rangers, Kilmarnock, Morton, Dundee, Dunfermline Athletic, and Hibernian (2 wins and 4 draws) – and were sitting comfortably in the top-half of the division. They were relegated at the end of the season.

=== Dunfermline Athletic ===
Wright was head-hunted to become manager of Dunfermline Athletic in October 1970, with the initial approach made by former Dunfermline manager Jock Stein acting as intermediary. It was regarded as one of Scottish football's top club jobs outside of Celtic and Rangers, and Wright's full-time responsibilities centred solely on team matters, with an administrative staff in support.

However, the Dunfermline team was in disarray. Despite having been European Cup-Winners' Cup semi-finalists as recently as March 1969, it opened the 1970–71 season with 14 defeats, and only two draws, in 16 competitive matches. Indeed, over the club's most recent 34 major Scottish league and cup matches (the length of a league season) from playing Dundee United on 10 December 1969 to Motherwell on 17 October 1970, the equivalent of only 17 points had been gathered. Such a total would have meant relegation in almost any previous post-war season.

In addition, several players had taken a stand against manager George Farm with Alex Edwards, Barrie Mitchell and Willie Renton (ironically Wright's former captain at St Mirren) refusing to return to training after the summer break. Renton was made a scapegoat and sacked, while the others were retained but stayed away from the club until meeting with Wright in October.

Wright quickly settled the players' grievances and immediately improved results, winning points from 7 of the 10 remaining fixtures until the turn of the year (against Dundee United, Rangers, Morton, Dundee, Hibernian, Airdrieonians and Ayr United, culminating in 4–1 and 5–0 home victories). Dunfermline eventually avoided relegation on goal-difference following a dramatic final series of results in which the team again picked up points in 7 of the closing 10 fixtures.

However, he held the managerial position at Dunfermline for little over half of the following season as the club revealed an extent of financial hardship which almost led to its demise. As the club's bank threatened closure, Wright was forced to sell his three most effective attacking players – Alex Edwards, Joe McBride and Pat Gardner – and field a team largely formed from the Club's previous two seasons' youth squads. In addition, influential senior players Bert Paton and John Lunn were lost to serious injury and illness. To cap a catalogue of misfortune, Club Chairman Leonard Jack, the man behind Alex Wright's appointment as manager, collapsed and died from a heart attack as he fought to stave off the financial crisis.

On the field, 3 wins, 7 draws, and the failure to avoid a succession of narrow defeats, left the team again in a precarious league position after 23 fixtures despite a defensive record bettered only by the top half-dozen clubs. Goal scoring was the principal problem; registering 6 blanks, and scoring more than one goal on only 3 occasions (two 2–2 draws and a 2–3 defeat).

When a new boardroom regime initiated further cost-cutting measures in February 1972, Wright was presented with a choice; remain with an immediate pay-cut and worsened conditions, or be replaced (as at St Mirren, he had opted to work without the protection of a contract). Having uprooted his family from the west coast at the club's insistence only five months earlier (in order to save on travelling expenses), Wright felt unable to accept the pay-cut being insisted upon and the club announced to the media that he and his assistant had resigned.

In February 1972, former Dunfermline player George Miller was appointed to assume the combined responsibilities of Wright, his assistant manager Willie McLean, and the club's chief administrative assistant Mr J Smith. The club was relegated at the end of the season.

The most noteworthy results of Wright's tenure at Dunfermline were a 1–1 draw at Celtic Park in the 1971 Scottish Cup, and successive 1–0 home victories over a strong Aberdeen side that finished both seasons second-placed in the League and with the best defensive record;

- on 6 February 1971, becoming only the third team to defeat Aberdeen in its opening 24 league fixtures;
- on 22 January 1972, becoming only the second team to defeat Aberdeen in its opening 22 League fixtures.

Wright attributed these two victories to a particular tactical ploy targeting Aberdeen defender and captain Martin Buchan.

After leaving Dunfermline, Wright worked the remainder of the 1971–72 season as Scottish scout for Bristol City under manager Alan Dicks.

=== Dumbarton ===
Wright became assistant manager of newly promoted Dumbarton in May 1972. Following the departure of manager Jackie Stewart to St Johnstone in January 1973, Wright was appointed as his replacement – initially on a part-time basis which he combined with a day-job of local government clerk, and then as full-time manager/secretary on a similar basis to his role at St Mirren.

Jackie Stewart had spent 4 years at Boghead from December 1968, raising standards and expectation in lifting the team from 14th in D2 to Champions in the final match of season 1971–72. Wright maintained the progress and held the post for four relatively successful years before handing over to his assistant Davie Wilson.

Despite Dumbarton having spent the previous 50 seasons in Division 2, Wright most notable achievements were to guide the team to an eighty-year high of tenth position in the Scottish League in 1973–74 and the semi-finals of both the Spring Cup and Scottish Cup in season 1975–76.

Youth development was once again a significant feature of Wright's time at Dumbarton. His scouting and contacts network introduced future full Scotland internationalists Murdo MacLeod, Ian Wallace and Graeme Sharp to the senior game, as well as minor internationalists Graeme Sinclair and Owen Coyle.

Scotland national team manager Willie Ormond proposed Wright to the SFA International Committee as his No. 2 in preparation for the World Cup in West Germany. However, the Committee failed to ratify Ormond's choice and instead of providing Ormond with an assistant, the SFA minutes confirm, initiated the process which would result in the later appointment of Scotland's first National Director of Coaching.

Difficulties in his home life and frustration at failing to secure promotion back to the top flight following League reorganisation led Wright to offer his resignation in February 1977. Chairman Robert Robertson initially encouraged him to continue, before reluctantly accepting Wright's renewed request at the end of that season. However, his value to the Club was acknowledged by Wright being given a salaried directorship which he then held until 1990. When Robertson sold Dumbarton to Hugh Fraser in the 1980s he claimed that the club had never been as well run during his 16 years in charge as when Wright was manager.

Wright later had a spell as caretaker manager in 1986 and led Dumbarton for a total of 210 league and cup matches. His first three seasons were at the top level of the Scottish League; his remaining matches were in the upper echelons of the second tier following League reconstruction into three divisions in 1975.

His total number of matches in charge is bettered only minimally by 1950s manager Peter McGown who was in charge for 216 matches at the lowest level of the Scottish League.

== Later career and legacy ==
Wright was given a directorship in 1977 and remained at Dumbarton in various roles for a further 13 years, including Managing Director, Executive Director and Director of Football.

In 1979, he fronted an ultimately unsuccessful attempt by Dumbarton's owners to invest in the Toronto-based franchise for a proposed Canadian Soccer League. The following year he travelled to Amsterdam with team manager and fellow director Sean Fallon in the anticipation of signing Dutch legend Johan Cruyff following earlier negotiations with the player's agent. However, Cruyff ultimately decided against the move.

Wright was widely credited with single-handedly keeping the club alive during an ownerless period in the mid-to-late 1980s and was named Dumbarton Citizen of the Year in recognition of his efforts. His salaried post was made redundant in late 1990 soon after a new regime had taken control, and Wright subsequently opted to relinquish his directorship and leave the club.

After leaving Boghead Park in 1990, Wright then worked as full-time Chief Scout for Kilmarnock under managers Alex Totten and Bobby Williamson, until retiring to become Scottish Scout for Bruce Rioch at both Millwall and Bolton Wanderers, and then at Leeds United under David O'Leary.

Wright's wholehearted and skilled contribution is widely recognised in footballing circles. Despite only serving a single season at Clyde and East Fife, he is remembered in the former's Centenary Brochure and the latter's historical display at their relocated Bayview Stadium. In addition to featuring in a hardback book of 'Partick Thistle Legends', Wright was posthumously inducted into the official 'St Mirren Hall of Fame' in November 2005, and the official 'Dumbarton Hall of Fame' in February 2023.

In 1986, he became only the fifth person honoured by an 'SFA Lifetime Achievement Award'. Wright's photograph is on permanent display at Hampden Park's Scottish Football Museum.

In the 1991 pre-season, Alex Ferguson brought his successful Manchester United European Cup-Winners' Cup team north to play a testimonial match in Alex Wright's honour.

Wright described himself particularly proud at having been appointed to each of his positions following approach by the club. He had not applied prior to any of his appointments.

On the occasion of his death, his memory was honoured by full-page obituaries in the match programmes of former clubs Partick Thistle, East Fife, St Mirren and Dumbarton. There was widespread support among Dumbarton fans for Wright's name to be included in the title of Dumbarton's relocated home in 2000.

== Honours ==
Partick Thistle

- Glasgow Cup : 1952–53, 1954–55, 1960–61
- Glasgow Charity Cup : 1948–49

Representative

- Glasgow FA v Sheffield FA : 16 Nov 1960 @ Celtic Park

St Mirren

- Paisley Charity Cup : 1967
- Renfrewshire Cup : 1966–67
- Scottish Second Division Champions: 1967–68
- Hall Of Fame

Dunfermline Athletic

- BBC TV Quiz Ball Series Champions : 1971

Dumbarton

- Stirlingshire Cup : 1972–73, 1974–75, 1985–86
- Hall Of Fame

Scottish Football Association

- Lifetime Achievement Award

== Personal life ==
His paternal uncle Wallace Wright played as an outside-left for Queen's Park and Amateur Scotland during the 1930s and 1940s.
