= Willie Sharp =

Scottish footballer (1922–1992)

Personal information
- Date of birth: 25 May 1922
- Place of birth: Dennistoun, Scotland
- Date of death: 16 January 1992 (aged 69)
- Place of death: Glasgow, Scotland
- Position: Inside forward

Youth career
- Glasgow 139th BB

Senior career*
Years	Team	Apps	(Gls)
1938–1939	Shettleston		
1939–1957	Partick Thistle	255	(90)

International career
1952	Scottish League XI	1	(0)
- * Club domestic league appearances and goals

William Sharp (25 May 1922 – 16 January 1992) was a Scottish professional footballer who played as an inside forward. His only professional club was Partick Thistle, and he holds the club's all-time goalscoring record (although the total includes seven years of unofficial wartime matches).

== Career ==
Born in Dennistoun, Glasgow, Sharp trained to become a plumber while moving through the grades as a footballer, being signed by top division Partick Thistle as a teenager in 1939 after a short spell in Junior level with Shettleston. The outbreak of World War II soon intervened, and he continued to develop with the Jags in unofficial competitions throughout the conflict (having been rejected from the Royal Air Force on health grounds), culminating in a Summer Cup win in June 1945. By now established in the creative inside left position but also adept playing at centre forward, Sharp was an important member of the Partick Thistle team after regular competitions resumed in 1946.

In December 1947, Sharp scored a goal after seven seconds had elapsed in a match against Queen of the South, which still stands as the quickest recorded in Scottish football. That season, Partick finished in 3rd position in the League Championship, and achieved the same in 1953–54. They also reached the 1953 Scottish League Cup Final but lost to East Fife, the same opponent who had defeated them narrowly in the semi-final of the 1949–50 Scottish Cup. Thistle also lost the 1956 Scottish League Cup Final leaving their talented 1950s generation without a major honour, although by then Sharp was no longer a first team regular, and he retired aged 35 in 1957 to continue his plumbing business which he had continued on a part-time basis during his playing career. He made 573 appearances for the Jags in all competitions, scoring 229 goals, and won the minor Glasgow Cup twice (1950–51 and 1952–53). He died in 1992.

Sharp has been mentioned as one of the most skilled players never to have been capped by the Scotland national team, the closest he came being a single appearance for the Scottish Football League XI in 1952, an unexpected but deserved 3–0 defeat to the Welsh Football League team which would have done little to improve his selection prospects. He could be considered unfortunate to have played in the same position as Billy Steel who was an almost automatic choice in the period, besides which there was a good selection of native talent across the country. (Note: Rangers, Celtic, Hibernian – with their Famous Five forward line – and Aberdeen all won the title in that decade, with Hearts, East Fife and Dundee also offering a strong challenge at times, while Motherwell and Clyde were both winners and runners-up in the Scottish Cup.)
