= Frank Christie =

Scottish footballer and manager

Personal information
- Full name: Frank Christie
- Date of birth: 17 February 1927
- Place of birth: Balbeggie, Perthshire, Scotland
- Date of death: 12 September 1996 (aged 69)
- Place of death: Perth, Scotland
- Position: Wing half

Youth career
- Scone City Boys
- 1944–1945: St Johnstone Young Men's Club

Senior career*
Years	Team	Apps	(Gls)
1945–1946	Liverpool	0	(0)
1945–1946	→ Forfar Athletic (loan)	0	(0)
1946–1949	Forfar Athletic	25	(13)
1949–1950	Liverpool	4	(0)
1951–1958	East Fife	304	(8)

Managerial career
- 1973–1976: East Fife
- * Club domestic league appearances and goals

Frank Christie (17 December 1927 – 12 September 1996) was a Scottish football player and manager.

== Playing career ==
Christie started his career at amateur side, St Johnstone Young Men's Club, Perth, Scotland.

He was signed by Liverpool on 17 July 1945 and subsequently loaned to Forfar having failed to break into the Liverpool first team from Liverpool's Central League reserve side. Forfar signed Christie permanently at the end of the 1945/46 season, where he enjoyed three years at the club before rejoining Liverpool F.C in March 1949. He played in four of Liverpool's League matches towards the end of the 1949–50 season, making his debut in defence alongside the likes of Bob Paisley and Phil Taylor in a fixture away to Manchester United on 15 March 1950 at Old Trafford before a crowd of 45,283.

In January 1951, East Fife paid Liverpool an £8,000 transfer fee to bring Christie back to Bayview. He spent the large part of his playing career at East Fife, and scored the winning goal in East Fife's 3–2 victory over Partick Thistle in the 1953–54 Scottish League Cup Final at Hampden Park, Glasgow in front of 38,529.

== Coaching career ==
In the summer of 1963, when St Johnstone FC manager Bobby Brown was restructuring his backroom staff, he appointed Frank Christie as first team trainer. This would prove to be a wise decision as Frank became a vital part of the management team. When Brown moved on to the role of Scotland national football team manager in 1967, Christie was placed in temporary charge of St Johnstone's team selection until the appointment of Willie Ormond as manager. His partnership with Ormond saw the team enter one of the most successful periods in the club's history. Following Ormond's move to the role of national team manager, Christie moved to East Fife as manager. Christie managed East Fife until 1976, and steered them to their first (and only) victory in a competitive match during peacetime over Glasgow Rangers defeating them 1–0 at Ibrox on 13 October 1973. Christie was closely associated with Scottish Junior team Scone Thistle whom he also managed.

In 1976 Jim Storrie brought him back to Perth. He had a further period in temporary charge after Storrie's resignation and the arrival of Alex Stuart in 1978. In 1985, when Saints were experiencing severe financial difficulties, he was a casualty of the cost-cutting exercise, thus ending a 21 years association with St Johnstone.

== Personal life ==
Frank's brother James (Jock) Christie played centre-half for Dundee United F.C.

== Honours ==
=== Club ===
East Fife

- Scottish League Cup (1): 1953
