= Joe Hogan (footballer, born 1938) =

Scottish footballer (born 1938)

Personal information
- Full name: Joseph Hogan
- Date of birth: 24 February 1938 (age 88)
- Place of birth: Armadale, Scotland
- Height: 5 ft 8 in (1.73 m)
- Positions: Right back; forward

Senior career*
| Years | Team | Apps | (Gls) |
| 1954–1955 | Newtongrange Star | | |
| 1955–1967 | Partick Thistle | 199 | (20) |

International career
| 1960–1962 | SFL trial v SFA | 2 | (0) |
| 1961 | Scotland U23 | 1 | (0) |
- * Club domestic league appearances and goals

Joseph Hogan (born 24 February 1938) is a Scottish former footballer whose only club at the professional level was Partick Thistle.

== Career ==
Raised in West Lothian, Hogan originally played as a forward; he joined Partick Thistle as a teenager in 1955, having enjoyed a single, successful season in the Junior level with Newtongrange Star, where he won the Edinburgh & District League alongside future Scotland star Alex Young.

He was at the Jags during a relatively successful era for the club across the 1950s and early 60s, and played in two of their Scottish League Cup final appearances in the period (all of which were lost) – against Celtic in 1956 and against Heart of Midlothian in the 1958 edition, by which point he had changed position and become established at right back. Hogan did win the Glasgow Cup in the 1960–61 season, and was involved in the club's challenge for the Scottish Football League title in the 1962–63 season, though they lost form after delays caused by a very harsh winter.

He was selected once for the Scotland U23 team in 1961, and played in two trial matches between the Scottish Football League XI and a SFA XI, but was never capped for either team at full level.

== Personal life ==
Outside football Hogan trained to become a schoolteacher specialising in science; he attained the position of principal teacher of physics at Queen's Park Secondary School in Glasgow before becoming an education officer for Strathclyde Regional Council. He was also an accomplished golfer.
