= George Smith (Scottish footballer) =

Scottish footballer

Personal information
- Date of birth: 1 June 1935 (age 91)
- Place of birth: Bathgate, Scotland
- Height: 5 ft 10 in (1.78 m)
- Position: Forward

Youth career
- Torphichen Juveniles
- 1951–1953: Partick Thistle

Senior career*
Years	Team	Apps	(Gls)
1953–1964	Partick Thistle	226	(77)
1964	Dundee United	6	(1)
1964–1966	Ballymena United		

International career
1958	Scottish League XI	1	(0)

Managerial career
- 1965–1966: Ballymena United
- * Club domestic league appearances and goals

George Smith (born 1 June 1935) is a Scottish former footballer who played as a forward, primarily for Partick Thistle.

== Career ==
Having joined while still a schoolboy at Bathgate Academy, Smith was with Partick Thistle during a relatively successful era for the Jags across the 1950s and early 60s, and played in two of their Scottish League Cup final appearances in the era (all of which were lost) – he was injured in the first against Celtic in 1956, and scored a consolation goal in the second against Heart of Midlothian in the 1958 edition. The club made a challenge for the Scottish Football League title in the 1962–63 season, but lost form after delays caused by a very harsh winter. He did win the Glasgow Cup on two occasions.

Other personal achievements included scoring four goals in a League Cup match against Stirling Albion in one of his first senior appearances, and being selected for the Scottish Football League XI in 1958. He was in the travelling squad for the full Scotland team in May 1957, but due to the importance of the three games in Europe (two important World Cup qualifiers and a friendly against holders West Germany) he was not risked to start, and with no substitutes at that time there was also no option of a later introduction from the bench.

In January 1964, having fallen out of favour at Firhill, Smith transferred to Dundee United in an exchange deal involving Norrie Davidson. The move did not work out, and in his short spell at Tannadice Park – interrupted by a viral infection – he only scored once, having found the net 125 times in all competitions during his decade with Partick. By that summer he had departed to become player-manager at Ballymena United in Northern Ireland.

== Personal life ==
Outside football he studied at the University of Edinburgh and trained to become a schoolteacher, eventually becoming a senior staff member at Alva Academy by the 1990s. He was an accomplished sprinter, winning a cash prize at the Jedburgh Border Games in 1961. In the 1970s he also worked in broadcasting, providing sports reports for BBC Scotland television.

His son Trevor was also a footballer who played for clubs including Dunfermline Athletic and Hamilton Academical.
