= Willie Telfer (footballer, born 1925) =

Scottish footballer and manager

Personal information
- Full name: William Douglas Telfer
- Date of birth: 26 October 1925
- Place of birth: Larkhall, Scotland
- Date of death: 12 November 1995 (aged 70)
- Position: Centre half

Youth career
- –1943: Burnbank Athletic

Senior career*
Years	Team	Apps	(Gls)
1943–1957	St Mirren	322	(28)
1957–1960	Rangers	69	(0)
1960–1961	Queen of the South	21	(0)
1961–1962	Hamilton Academical	28	(1)

International career
1951–1954	Scottish League XI	4	(0)
1953	Scotland	1	(0)

Managerial career
- 1962–1965: Albion Rovers
- * Club domestic league appearances and goals

William Douglas Telfer (26 October 1925 – 11 November 1995) was a Scottish football player and manager. He played as a centre half for St Mirren, Rangers, Queen of the South and Hamilton Academical.

He represented Scotland once, in a 1954 British Home Championship match against Wales, and made four appearances for the Scottish Football League XI.

Telfer later managed Albion Rovers from 1962 until 1965.
