= Danny McLennan =

Scottish footballer and manager

Personal information
- Full name: Daniel Morrison McLennan
- Date of birth: 5 May 1925
- Place of birth: Stirling, Scotland
- Date of death: 11 May 2004 (aged 79)
- Place of death: Crail, Fife, Scotland
- Positions: Inside forward; wing half

Senior career*
Years	Team	Apps	(Gls)
–	Rangers		
1946	Stirling Albion		
1946–1947	Falkirk	6	(0)
1947–1957	East Fife	175	(16)
1957	Dundee	0	(0)
1957–1959	Berwick Rangers	25	(4)

Managerial career
- 1957–1960: Berwick Rangers
- 1960–1961: Stirling Albion
- 1962: Worcester City
- 1963: Philippines
- 1963–1964: Mauritius
- 1965–1969: Rhodesia
- 1973–1974: Iran
- 1974–1975: Bahrain
- 1975–1976: Iraq
- 1978: Kongsvinger IL
- 1980: Jordan
- Young Africans
- 1984: Malawi
- 1985-1986: Ħamrun Spartans
- 1998: Fiji
- Libya
- Churchill Brothers
Medal record
Men's football
Representing Iraq (as manager)
Arabian Gulf Cup
Silver medal – second place	1976
Palestine Cup
Silver medal – second place	1975
Representing Fiji (as manager)
Melanesia Cup
Silver medal – second place	1994
South Pacific Mini Games
Silver medal – second place	1993
- * Club domestic league appearances and goals

Daniel Morrison McLennan (5 May 1925 – 11 May 2004) was a Scottish football player and coach. As a player, he was a Scottish League Cup winner with East Fife. His extensive coaching career took him all around the world and spanned a period of forty years, during which he managed ten national teams: the Philippines, Mauritius, Rhodesia, Iran, Bahrain, Iraq, Malawi, Jordan, Fiji and Libya.

== Playing career ==
Born in Stirling, McLennan represented Scotland at schoolboy international level and played junior football for Lochore Welfare. He joined Rangers as a 17–year-old apprentice, but after failing to break through to the first team he moved to Falkirk. McLennan's most successful spell as a player was at East Fife from 1947 to 1957. He was part of the team that won the Scottish League Cup in 1953. He played briefly for Dundee before joining Berwick Rangers as player–manager.

== Management career ==
His first coaching role came as player-manager of Berwick Rangers in 1957, and went on to coach the national teams of the Philippines, Mauritius, Rhodesia, Iran, Bahrain, Iraq, Malawi, Jordan, Fiji, and Libya.

McLennan was appointed manager of Oldham Athletic from May 26th to June 28th 1960, but left for Stirling Albion.

McLennan lead Stirling Albion to promotion to the top division in 1961, and to the semi-finals of Scottish League Cup for the first time, also in 1961.

With both Rhodesia, in 1970, and Iran, in 1974, McLennan almost qualified for the FIFA World Cup, but lost out in the play-off round twice. He came to Iran in March 1973, and first served as assistant coach of the national team under Mahmoud Bayati. The next year, he led the Iranian team as head coach at the 1974 RCD Cup.

He took Malawi to its first African Cup of Nations in 1984. Unfortunately a rigged draw between Algeria and Nigeria ended any hopes of qualifying from the group. He also managed Indian club Churchill Brothers.

== Honours ==
=== Player ===
East Fife

- Scottish League Cup: 1953–54

=== Manager ===
Stirling Albion

- Scottish Second Division: 1960–61

Iraq

- Arabian Gulf Cup: Runners-up 1976
