= Dick Beattie =

Scottish footballer

Personal information
- Full name: Richard Scott Beattie
- Date of birth: 24 October 1936
- Place of birth: Glasgow, Scotland
- Date of death: 15 August 1990 (aged 53)
- Place of death: Old Kilpatrick, Scotland
- Position: Goalkeeper

Youth career
- 1954–1955: Duntocher Hibernian

Senior career*
Years	Team	Apps	(Gls)
1955–1959	Celtic	114	(0)
1959–1962	Portsmouth	122	(0)
1962–1963	Peterborough United	10	(0)
1963–1964	St Mirren	34	(0)
1964	Brechin City	1	(0)
Total		281	(0)

International career
1957	Scottish Football League XI	1	(0)
1957–1958	Scotland under-23	3	(0)
- * Club domestic league appearances and goals

Richard Scott Beattie (24 October 1936 – 15 August 1990) was a Scottish professional footballer who played as a goalkeeper in both the Scottish and English football leagues. A Scotland under-23 international, who appeared in three major finals with Celtic in his early career, he was later imprisoned after being found guilty of involvement in the British betting scandal of 1964, and banned from football for life, aged 27.

== Career ==
Beattie signed for Celtic in September 1954, however he spent the 1954–55 season playing at Junior level for Duntocher Hibernian. His spell at Duntocher was a successful one with the club reaching the final of the Scottish Junior Cup in 1955, losing to Kilsyth Rangers after a replay and Beattie was also capped for the Scotland Junior international side.

His competitive debut for Celtic came on 3 September 1955 in a Scottish League Cup tie against Falkirk and this first season would end with a maiden Senior final appearance, Celtic losing 3–1 to Hearts in the Scottish Cup. It was in the League Cup however that Beattie would enjoy his greatest success. Victory over Partick Thistle after a replay in the 1956 Scottish League Cup Final earned him his first winners medal. The following season saw a career highlight as Celtic defeated city rivals Rangers, 7–1 in the 1957 Scottish League Cup Final.

In August 1959, Beattie moved to England, joining Portsmouth of the Football League Second Division. A fan of horse-racing, he often wore a jockey's cap. Pompey were relegated at the end of the 1960–61 season while in that year's FA Cup, Beattie was involved in a controversial incident when a bad mistake in a third round tie against Peterborough United gifted the opponents the lead. He went on to sign for Peterborough in 1962 however after only 10 games, including another controversially error strewn performance in a league match versus QPR, Beattie returned to Scotland and joined St Mirren in January 1963.

Dick Beattie established himself as the first choice keeper at Love Street but in April 1964, a story broke in the Sunday People newspaper which would end his career, exposing a match fixing operation which became known as the British betting scandal of 1964. The ringleader, a fellow Scotsman and former professional footballer Jimmy Gauld, sold his story and his taped evidence incriminated himself, Beattie and eight other players. At the trial in Nottingham, Beattie received a nine-month prison sentence and was subsequently banned from football for life. On release from prison, he began a new life working in the shipyards.

While awaiting trial, and having been released by Saint Mirren, Beattie would make a single appearance for Brechin City in a Scottish League Cup match against Alloa Athletic on 15 August 1964. This would be his final appearance in senior football.

== Playing honours ==
=== Celtic ===
- Scottish League Cup (2)
  - 1956, 1957
