= Bill Eckersley =

English footballer (1925–1982)

Personal information
- Full name: William Eckersley
- Date of birth: 16 July 1925
- Place of birth: Southport, England
- Date of death: 25 October 1982 (aged 57)
- Place of death: Blackburn, England
- Position: Left back

Youth career
- High Park

Senior career*
Years	Team	Apps	(Gls)
1947–1961	Blackburn Rovers	406	(20)

International career
1950–1953	England	17	(0)
- * Club domestic league appearances and goals

William Eckersley (16 July 1925 – 25 October 1982) was an English footballer. He played as a fullback, spending his entire playing career at Blackburn Rovers.

== Football career ==
Eckersley was born at Southport and after finishing school worked as a lorry driver. He was playing amateur football for High Park in 1947 when he was recommended to Blackburn Rovers by High Parker, Johnny Fairhurst, who signed for Blackburn Rovers himself in 1938.

Although he retained his driving job, he signed as an amateur for Rovers later that month. He initially played in Rovers' reserves where his form was sufficiently good for him to be offered professional terms in March 1948.

He made his Football League debut in the final match of the 1947–48 season, with Blackburn already doomed to relegation. Although Blackburn were to spend the next ten seasons in the Second Division, Eckersley's consistent performances led to him being considered one of the best full-backs in the country, and despite not having made an international appearance he was taken with the England squad to the 1950 World Cup finals in Brazil, collecting his first cap in the final match against Spain. Having lost to America, England needed to win this match to stay in the World Cup. Spain took the lead through centre-forward Telmo Zarra in the forty-seventh minute and then dropped back into deep defence. Even with Stanley Matthews and Tom Finney operating, England could not make the breakthrough and their World Cup challenge was over. This was however the start of an international full-back pairing with Alf Ramsey, with the pair making fifteen appearances together.

As Blackburn continued in their attempts to return to the First Division, Eckersley continued to give good service to both club and country, collecting a total of 17 caps, as well as three "B" caps and representing the Football League on six occasions. His final England appearance came on 25 November 1953 in a friendly against Hungary. England lost the match 6–3, with Ferenc Puskás scoring twice and Nándor Hidegkuti converting a hat trick. This was England's second defeat by foreign opponents on home territory after Ireland, and the match changed the face of English football. As well as Eckersley, several other England players were never to represent their country, including Ramsey and Stan Mortensen.

Eckersley had the ability to dribble all the way up to the opposition penalty area. With superb ball control, he was able to let a player pass him; he would then extend his left leg behind the opponent and nick the ball away without fouling the opposing player, thus earning him the "telescopic leg" tag.

Blackburn finally returned to the First Division in 1958, enabling Eckersley to play one complete season in the top flight, although his better days were behind him. Although the club reached the final of the FA Cup in 1960, Eckersley was not selected for the final, with Dave Whelan being preferred.

The following season, his career was ended by injury after over 430 first-team appearances for Blackburn, with 21 goals (of which 18 came from the penalty spot).

== Later career ==
Following his retirement, a testimonial match was held at Ewood Park on 24 April 1961 which was attended by a crowd of 21,000.

He later ran a confectionery business and after this failed he worked as a taxi driver before returning to his first career as a lorry driver.

He died in October 1982 aged 57 and his ashes were scattered around the pitch of Ewood Park by his sons prior to a match.

== International appearances ==
Eckersley made 17 appearances for England in official international matches, as follows:

Date	Venue	Opponent	Result	Goals	Competition
2 July 1950	Estádio do Maracanã, Rio de Janeiro	Spain	0–1	0	1950 World Cup: Group 2
22 November 1950	Arsenal Stadium, London	Yugoslavia	2–2	0	Friendly
14 April 1951	Wembley Stadium, London	Scotland	2–3	0	British Home Championship
9 May 1951	Wembley Stadium, London	Argentina	2–1	0	Friendly
19 May 1951	Goodison Park, Liverpool	Portugal	5–2	0	Friendly
28 November 1951	Wembley Stadium, London	Austria	2–2	0	Friendly
25 May 1952	Ernst-Happel-Stadion, Vienna	Austria	3–2	0	Friendly
28 May 1952	Hardturm, Zürich	Switzerland	3–0	0	Friendly
4 October 1952	Windsor Park, Belfast	Northern Ireland	2–2	0	British Home Championship
17 May 1953	El Monumental, Buenos Aires	Argentina	0–0	0	Friendly
24 May 1953	Estadio Nacional de Chile, Santiago	Chile	2–1	0	Friendly
31 May 1953	Estadio Centenario, Montevideo	Uruguay	1–2	0	Friendly
8 June 1953	Yankee Stadium, New York	United States	6–3	0	Friendly
10 October 1953	Ninian Park, Cardiff	Wales	4–1	0	British Home Championship; 1954 World Cup qualifier
21 October 1953	Wembley Stadium, London	Rest of the World	4–4	0	Friendly
11 November 1953	Goodison Park, Liverpool	Northern Ireland	3–1	0	British Home Championship; 1954 World Cup qualifier
25 November 1953	Wembley Stadium, London	Hungary	3–6	0	Friendly
