= John Jack =

Scottish footballer

Personal information
- Full name: John Jack
- Birth name: Jonas Kaduskevieche
- Date of birth: 9 March 1932
- Place of birth: Bellshill, Scotland
- Date of death: 22 October 1988 (aged 56)
- Place of death: Bellshill, Scotland
- Position: Centre half

Senior career*
Years	Team	Apps	(Gls)
–	Stonehouse Violet		
1950–1959	Celtic	48	(0)
1959–1960	Morton		
- * Club domestic league appearances and goals

John Jack (9 March 1932 – 22 October 1988) was a Scottish footballer who played for Celtic and Morton.

At Celtic, where he spent nine years, he was mainly a reserve behind Jim Mallan, Alec Boden and Jock Stein, with Bobby Evans also being asked to fill in rather than calling upon the inexperienced Jack even in minor competitions. However he did feature regularly in the 1956–57 season, during which he won the Scottish League Cup with the Hoops overcoming Partick Thistle in the final after a replay to win that competition for the first time. When Stein retired and took over the reserve team, Jack assisted until he departed in 1959, spending a short period with Morton.

Born Jonas Kaduskevieche, he was one of four Scots of Lithuanian descent to play for the club between the 1930s and 1960s, all of them defenders, the most famous being Billy McNeill who joined as a teenager in 1957 and quickly overtook Jack in the queue for team selection.
