= Trevor Smith (footballer, born 1965) =

Scottish footballer

Personal information
- Full name: Trevor Alan Smith
- Date of birth: 6 May 1965 (age 61)
- Place of birth: Whitburn, Scotland
- Position: Forward

Youth career
- Sauchie Juveniles

Senior career*
Years	Team	Apps	(Gls)
1982–1991	Dunfermline Athletic	109	(14)
1989–1990	→ Hamilton Academical (loan)	3	(2)
1991	Kilmarnock	13	(1)
1991–1993	Hamilton Academical	57	(21)
1993–1994	Portadown		
1994–1996	Glentoran		
1996–1998	Portadown		
1998–1999	Newry Town		
1999–2000	Crusaders		
Total		189	(38)
- * Club domestic league appearances and goals

Trevor Alan Smith (born 6 May 1965) is a Scottish former footballer who played as a forward for Dunfermline Athletic, Hamilton Academical and Kilmarnock in Scotland, and for Portadown, Glentoran, Newry Town and Crusaders in Northern Ireland.

Described by Dunfermline as a 'stalwart' at the Fife club, he won two lower division titles (1985–86 Scottish Second Division and 1988–89 Scottish First Division, plus another promotion to the top tier in 1986–87) over nine years at East End Park. In his spell at Hamilton, the club missed out on promotion in the 1991–92 season by a margin of two goals.

After moving to Northern Ireland aged 28, he was immediately involved in a dramatic battle for the league title with Portadown in 1993–94 which ended in disappointment, won the Irish Cup with Glentoran in 1996 then returned to Portadown, followed by a year at Newry and a spell at Crusaders.

His father George was also a footballer and a forward, who played mainly for Partick Thistle.
