= Lawrie Thomson =

Scottish footballer

Personal information
- Full name: Lawrence James Thomson
- Date of birth: 26 August 1936
- Place of birth: Menstrie, Scotland
- Date of death: 10 March 2006 (aged 69)
- Position: Forward

Senior career*
Years	Team	Apps	(Gls)
?–1955	Bo'ness United		
1955–1960	Partick Thistle	16	(1)
1960–1960	Carlisle United	13	(1)
1960–1962	St Johnstone	17	(4)
1962–1963	Alloa Athletic	19	(6)
1963–1964	Ashford Town	40	(9)
1964–1968	Margate	90	(26)
1968–1968	Folkestone		
1968–1969	Hastings United		
1969–1972	Canterbury City	59	(6)
- * Club domestic league appearances and goals

Lawrence James Thomson (26 August 1936 – 10 March 2006) was a Scottish footballer who played as a forward. He represented Scotland at Youth level.

Lawrie began his senior career at Scottish Junior club Bo'ness United. In 1955 he joined Scottish League club Partick Thistle where he won a 1958 Scottish League Cup runners-up medal. Early in 1960 Lawrie moved to English League Carlisle United but returned to Scotland with St Johnstone at the start of the 1960–61 season. He subsequently moved to Alloa Athletic for the 1962-63 campaign.

Thereafter until his retirement from playing in 1972 Lawrie appeared for a series of English non-league Southern League teams: Ashford Town (Kent); Margate; Folkestone; Hastings United and Canterbury City.

In 1977, he emigrated to Toronto, Ontario, Canada.
