= Len Graham (footballer) =

Northern Irish footballer and manager (1925-2007)

Personal information
- Full name: William George Leonard Graham
- Date of birth: 17 October 1925
- Place of birth: Belfast, Northern Ireland
- Date of death: 30 September 2007 (aged 81)
- Place of death: Blackpool, England
- Height: 5 ft 9 in (1.75 m)
- Position: Full-back

Senior career*
Years	Team	Apps	(Gls)
- Linfield Swifts
–1949	Brantwood		
1949–1958	Doncaster Rovers	312	(3)
1958–1959	Torquay United	20	(0)
1959–1960	Ards		

International career
1951–1958	Northern Ireland	14	(0)

Managerial career
- 1959–1960: Ards
- * Club domestic league appearances and goals

William George Leonard Graham (17 October 1925 – 30 September 2007) was a Northern Ireland international footballer and manager. A full-back, he made 303 league appearances in a nine-year career in the Football League with Doncaster Rovers lasting most of the 1950s. He also played for Linfield Swifts, Brantwood, and Torquay United, and briefly managed Ards. He won 14 caps for Northern Ireland in the 1950s.

== Club career ==
Graham began his career playing as an inside-forward with Linfield Swifts but began playing as a full-back after joining Brantwood. In October 1949, he became one of Peter Doherty's first signings as Doncaster Rovers manager, although had to wait until 18 March 1950 for his debut, a 2–0 home win against Wrexham. "Donny" went on to win promotion out of the Third Division North as champions in 1949–50. The Belle Vue club then successfully survived as a mid-table Second Division side in 1950–51, 1951–52, 1952–53, 1953–54, 1954–55, 1955–56, and 1956–57, before being relegated into the Third Division at the end of the 1957–58 campaign. In November 1958, Graham signed with Torquay United. He played 20 Fourth Division games to help Eric Webber's "Gulls" to a 12th-place finish in 1958–59. He then left Plainmoor and returned to Northern Ireland as player-manager of Irish League side Ards, but left Ards at the end of the 1959–60 season.

== International career ==
On 7 March 1951, Graham made his debut for Peter Doherty's Northern Ireland in a 2–1 defeat at home to Wales and was a regular in the Northern Irish side until the end of 1955 when Willie Cunningham replaced him. Graham was a member of the 22-man 1958 Northern Ireland World Cup squad, but was one of five unlucky squad members who didn't travel to Sweden for the tournament (of 16 nations taking part, Northern Ireland was one of only three which did not take the full permitted complement of 22 players). However, he made one further appearance for Northern Ireland, on 4 October 1958, in a 3–3 draw at home to England, their first game after the World Cup finals. Graham remains the most capped international player in Doncaster Rovers' history.

== Coaching career ==
Graham later worked as first-team coach at Stoke City and became the new manager Tony Waddington's assistant in 1960. From 1965 he coached at Port Vale under manager Stanley Matthews, before taking up the same position at Blackpool in 1967, under manager Stan Mortensen, before he retired from football in 1975, after which he worked at British Aerospace.

== Career statistics ==
=== Club playing statistics ===
Appearances and goals by club, season and competition
Club	Season	League			FA Cup		Total	
Club	Season	Division	Apps	Goals	Apps	Goals	Apps	Goals
Doncaster Rovers	1949–50	Third Division North	10	0	0	0	10	0
Doncaster Rovers	1950–51	Second Division	38	1	1	0	39	1
Doncaster Rovers	1951–52	Second Division	39	0	3	0	42	0
Doncaster Rovers	1952–53	Second Division	34	0	1	0	35	0
Doncaster Rovers	1953–54	Second Division	36	0	3	0	39	0
Doncaster Rovers	1954–55	Second Division	34	0	6	0	40	0
Doncaster Rovers	1955–56	Second Division	31	0	3	0	34	0
Doncaster Rovers	1956–57	Second Division	41	0	2	0	43	0
Doncaster Rovers	1957–58	Second Division	36	0	1	0	37	0
Doncaster Rovers	1958–59	Third Division	13	2	2	0	15	2
Doncaster Rovers	Total		312	3	22	0	334	3
Torquay United	1962–63	Fourth Division	20	0	3	0	23	0
Career total			332	3	25	0	357	3

=== International playing statistics ===
Northern Ireland national team
Year	Apps	Goals
1951	1	0
1952	3	0
1953	1	0
1954	2	0
1955	3	0
1956	0	0
1957	0	0
1958	1	0
Total	14	0

== Honours ==
Doncaster Rovers

- Football League Third Division North: 1949–50
