= Ian Gardiner (footballer) =

Scottish footballer (1928–1990)

Personal information
- Full name: James Ian Gardiner
- Date of birth: 18 October 1928
- Place of birth: Balbeggie, Perthshire, Scotland
- Date of death: 15 April 1990 (aged 61)
- Place of death: Balbeggie, Perthshire, Scotland
- Height: 1.80 m (5 ft 11 in)
- Position: Centre forward

Youth career
- Balbeggie Amateurs

Senior career*
Years	Team	Apps	(Gls)
1949–1956	East Fife	137	(67)
1956–1959	Motherwell	95	(48)
1959	Raith Rovers	7	(0)
1959–1960	East Fife	28	(18)
1960–1962	St Johnstone	40	(11)
1962–1963	Montrose	35	(14)
Total		342	(158)

International career
1954	Scottish Football League XI	1	(1)
1957	Scotland	1	(0)
- * Club domestic league appearances and goals

James Ian Gardiner (18 October 1928 – 15 April 1990) was a Scottish footballer who played for East Fife, Motherwell, Raith Rovers, St Johnstone, Montrose and the Scotland national football team. He scored 125 goals in the top division of the Scottish Football League, and 217 goals in all competitions, during his career. He also represented the Scottish League once, scoring against the Irish League in a 5–1 win in 1954.

Gardiner died in Balbeggie on 15 April 1990, at the age of 61.
