= Reg Davies (footballer, born 1929) =

Welsh footballer (1929–2009)

Personal information
- Full name: Ellis Reginald Davies
- Date of birth: 27 May 1929
- Place of birth: Cymmer, Wales
- Date of death: 9 February 2009 (aged 79)
- Place of death: Perth, Australia
- Position: Inside forward

Youth career
- Southampton

Senior career*
Years	Team	Apps	(Gls)
1949–1951	Southend United	41	(18)
1951–1958	Newcastle United	157	(49)
1958–1962	Swansea Town	111	(29)
1962–1964	Carlisle United	65	(13)
1964	Merthyr Tydfil F.C.		

International career
1952–1957	Wales	6	(0)
- * Club domestic league appearances and goals

Ellis Reginald Davies (27 May 1929 – 9 February 2009) was a Welsh professional footballer who played for Southend United, Newcastle United, Swansea Town and Carlisle United, and won six caps for Wales.

Davies began his professional career at Southend United in 1949 after serving in the British Army, having previously been on the books of Southampton as an amateur. After two impressive seasons at Roots Hall, he was signed by Newcastle United for £10,000 in April 1951, where Newcastle paid £9,000 up front and £1,000 when Davies made his full international debut, which he did against Scotland at Ninian Park, 18 months after joining Newcastle. Davies went on to play six times for Wales, his final cap coming against England in 1957.

After seven seasons at Newcastle, where he played 157 league matches and scored 49 goals, Davies was sent to Swansea Town in October 1958 as part of the deal that took Ivor Allchurch to Newcastle. Davies spent four seasons at Swansea, before finishing his league career with two seasons at Carlisle United. In 1966, Davies left professional football, and joined non-league Merthyr Tydfil where he spent one season.

As of November 1970 he was player-manager of King's Lynn.

In 1971, Davies emigrated to Perth, Australia, where he stayed in football and coached several local sides. He remained in Perth until his death on 9 February 2009.
