= Billy Smyth =

Northern Ireland footballer

Personal information
- Full name: William Thomas Smyth
- Date of birth: c. 1925
- Place of birth: Belfast, Northern Ireland
- Date of death: 14 January 2005 (aged 79–80)
- Place of death: Belfast, Northern Ireland
- Height: 5 ft 11 in (1.80 m)
- Position: Goalkeeper

Youth career
- Balmoral United
- 1943–1944: Distillery

Senior career*
Years	Team	Apps	(Gls)
1944–1955	Distillery		
1955–1956	Ards		

International career
1948–1953	Northern Ireland	4	(0)
- * Club domestic league appearances and goals

William Thomas Smyth (c. 1925 – 14 January 2005) was a Northern Irish footballer who played as a goalkeeper.

== Career ==
Born in Belfast, Smyth played for Balmoral United, Distillery and Ards. He also earned four caps for the Northern Ireland national team.
