= Wallace Wright (footballer) =

Scottish footballer

Personal information
- Full name: Wallace Laird Wright
- Date of birth: 15 October 1912
- Place of birth: Govanhill, Scotland
- Position: Outside left

Senior career*
Years	Team	Apps	(Gls)
1934–1945	Queen's Park	62	(14)

International career
1936	Scotland Amateurs	2	(1)
- * Club domestic league appearances and goals

Wallace Laird Wright was a Scottish amateur football outside left who played in the Scottish League for Queen's Park. He was capped by Scotland at amateur level.
