= Frank Donlevy =

Scottish footballer (born 1932)

Personal information
- Full name: Francis Donlevy
- Date of birth: 16 December 1932
- Place of birth: Edinburgh, Scotland
- Position: Wing half

Youth career
- Merchiston Thistle
- 1952–1954: Hibernian

Senior career*
Years	Team	Apps	(Gls)
1954–1961	Partick Thistle	151	(8)
1961–1962	St Johnstone	17	(4)
1962–1963	Berwick Rangers	18	(1)
Total		186	(13)
- * Club domestic league appearances and goals

Francis Donlevy (born 16 December 1932) is a Scottish former footballer who played for Partick Thistle, St Johnstone and Berwick Rangers. He later moved to Australia, where he played for Juventus.
