= Jackie Stewart (footballer, born 1929) =

Scottish footballer

Personal information
- Full name: John Stewart
- Date of birth: 23 January 1929
- Place of birth: Armadale, Scotland
- Date of death: 10 January 2004 (aged 74)
- Place of death: Edinburgh, Scotland
- Position: Right winger

Youth career
- Royal Albert

Senior career*
| Years | Team | Apps | (Gls) |
| 1950–1951 | Dunfermline Athletic | 17 | (5) |
| 1951–1957 | East Fife | 182 | (33) |
| 1957–1958 | Walsall | 28 | (4) |
- Nuneaton Borough
| Total | | 227 | (42) |

International career
| 1952 | Scottish Football League XI | 2 | (0) |
- * Club domestic league appearances and goals

John Stewart (23 January 1929 – 10 January 2004) was a Scottish footballer, who played for Dunfermline Athletic, East Fife and Walsall. Stewart represented the Scottish League twice, in 1952.
