= Tommy Ewing =

Scottish footballer

Personal information
- Full name: Thomas Ewing
- Date of birth: 2 May 1937 (age 89)
- Place of birth: Larkhall, Scotland
- Position: Left winger

Youth career
- Larkhall Thistle

Senior career*
Years	Team	Apps	(Gls)
1956–1961	Partick Thistle	131	(39)
1961–1964	Aston Villa	39	(4)
1964–1966	Partick Thistle	37	(15)
1966–1967	Greenock Morton	10	(3)
1967–1971	Hamilton Academical	12	(6)
Total		229	(67)

International career
1957	Scottish Football League XI	1	(0)
1957–1958	Scotland	2	(0)

Managerial career
- 1969–1970: Hamilton Academical
- * Club domestic league appearances and goals

Thomas Ewing (born 2 May 1937) is a Scottish former professional footballer. He represented the Scottish Football League XI and was capped twice by Scotland.

Ewing, a left-winger, played for Birkenshaw Welfare Hearts and Larkhall Thistle before joining Partick Thistle. He won both of his Scotland caps while with Partick, against England and Wales in 1958.

He joined Aston Villa in February 1962, making 39 league appearances before returning to Partick Thistle. He subsequently played for Morton and Hamilton Academical. He also managed Hamilton from November 1969 to 1970.
