= Jimmy Walker (footballer, born 1925) =

Scottish-American footballer (born 1925)

Personal information
- Date of birth: 1925
- Place of birth: Detroit, Michigan, U.S.
- Height: 5 ft 7 in (1.70 m)
- Position: Winger

Youth career
- Renfrew

Senior career*
Years	Team	Apps	(Gls)
1944–1947	Heart of Midlothian	7	(1)
1947–1956	Partick Thistle	162	(72)
1956–1957	Third Lanark	20	(13)
Total		189	(86)

International career
1946	Scotland	1	(0)
- * Club domestic league appearances and goals

Jimmy Walker (born 1925, date of death unknown) was a Scottish footballer, who played as a winger for Renfrew, Heart of Midlothian, Partick Thistle and Third Lanark.

Born in Detroit, Michigan but raised in Paisley, Renfrewshire, Walker represented Scotland once, in January 1946. Walker is deceased.

== See also ==
- List of Scotland international footballers born outside Scotland
