= David Mathers (footballer) =

Scottish footballer

Personal information
- Full name: David Cochrane Mathers
- Date of birth: 23 October 1931
- Place of birth: Glasgow, Scotland
- Date of death: 22 August 2014 (aged 82)
- Place of death: Southport, England
- Position: Left half

Youth career
- 1947–1949: Partick Thistle

Senior career*
| Years | Team | Apps | (Gls) |
| 1949–1959 | Partick Thistle | 180 | (9) |
| 1959–1960 | Headington/Oxford United | | |
| 1960–1961 | Partick Thistle | 0 | (0) |
| 1961–1962 | East Stirlingshire | 11 | (1) |
| Total | | 191 | (10) |

International career
| 1954 | Scotland | 1 | (0) |
| 1956 | Scottish League XI | 1 | (0) |
- * Club domestic league appearances and goals

David Cochrane Mathers (23 October 1931 – 22 August 2014) was a Scottish footballer, who played as a left-half for Partick Thistle and the Scotland national team.

Mathers joined Partick Thistle from Govan High School in 1947 and turned professional two years later, aged 17. He remained there until September 1959, when he joined Southern League team Headington United. That club changed its name to Oxford United the following summer. Mathers returned to Partick in December 1960, but did not make any more first team appearances for the club. He signed for East Stirlingshire in the summer of 1961 and retired after one season there.

Mathers played once for Scotland, against Finland in what was their final preparation match before the 1954 FIFA World Cup finals. Although named in Scotland's 22-man squad for Switzerland, Scotland decided to take only 13 of the 22 to the finals. Mathers stayed at home on reserve, along with the likes of Bobby Combe and Jimmy Binning. Inside forward George Hamilton was also on reserve, but travelled after Bobby Johnstone withdrew through injury. Mathers also represented the Scottish League once, in 1956.
