= William Dickson (footballer, born 1923) =

Northern Irish footballer

Bill Dickson
Personal information
- Full name: William Dickson
- Date of birth: 15 March 1923
- Place of birth: Lurgan, Northern Ireland
- Date of death: 31 May 2002 (aged 79)
- Place of death: Lurgan, Northern Ireland
- Height: 1.78 m (5 ft 10 in)
- Position: Wing half

Senior career*
Years	Team	Apps	(Gls)
1945	Glenavon	?	(?)
1945–1947	Notts County	21	(2)
1947–1953	Chelsea	101	(8)
1953–1956	Arsenal	29	(1)
1956–1957	Mansfield Town	19	(0)
1958	Glenavon	?	(?)
Total		170	(7)

International career
1951–1954	Northern Ireland	12	(0)
- * Club domestic league appearances and goals

William Dickson, also known as Bill Dickson or Billy Dickson (15 March 1923 – 31 May 2002), was a Northern Irish footballer who played at both professional and international levels as a wing half.

== Career ==
=== Club career ===
Born in Lurgan, Dickson began his career with hometown club Glenavon, before moving to England in November 1945 to sign with Notts County. Dickson also played in England for Chelsea, Arsenal and Mansfield Town, making a total of 170 appearances in the Football League for all four clubs. Dickson retired due to a shoulder injury in 1957, before returning briefly to play with first club Glenavon in January 1958.

=== International career ===
Dickson earned a total of twelve caps for Northern Ireland between 1951 and 1954.
