= Willie Cunningham (Northern Irish footballer) =

Northern Irish footballer and manager

William Cunningham
Personal information
- Full name: William Edward Cunningham
- Date of birth: 17 May 1930
- Place of birth: Newtownabbey, Northern Ireland
- Date of death: 31 August 2007 (aged 77)
- Place of death: Dunfermline, Scotland
- Position: Defender

Senior career*
Years	Team	Apps	(Gls)
- Ardrossan Winton Rovers
1950–1954	St Mirren	61	(1)
1954–1960	Leicester City	127	(4)
1960–1963	Dunfermline Athletic	70	(4)
Total		258	(9)

International career
1951–1962	Northern Ireland	30	(0)

Managerial career
- 1964–1967: Dunfermline Athletic
- 1968–1972: Falkirk
- 1973–1974: St Mirren
- * Club domestic league appearances and goals

William Edward Cunningham (20 February 1930 – 31 August 2007) was a Northern Ireland international footballer and manager.

Born in County Antrim but raised in Scotland from a young age, he signed for St Mirren in 1950 and played there until 1954 when he left for Leicester City. He joined Dunfermline Athletic in 1960 and was a member of the Scottish Cup-winning team which beat Celtic 2–0 in 1961. After retiring from playing, he went into management with Dunfermline Athletic and Falkirk. He returned to manage St Mirren in 1972, but resigned in 1974 for personal reasons. Before leaving, he recommended Alex Ferguson as his successor.

He rejected an approach from the Scottish FA to become the Scotland national team manager in 1971.

He played 30 matches for Northern Ireland, and was a member of their 1958 FIFA World Cup team.

He died, aged 77, on 31 August 2007.

== Honours ==
Falkirk

- Stirlingshire Cup : 1969-70
