= Balbeggie =

Village in Perth and Kinross, Scotland

Coordinates: 56.451211°N 3.349777°W

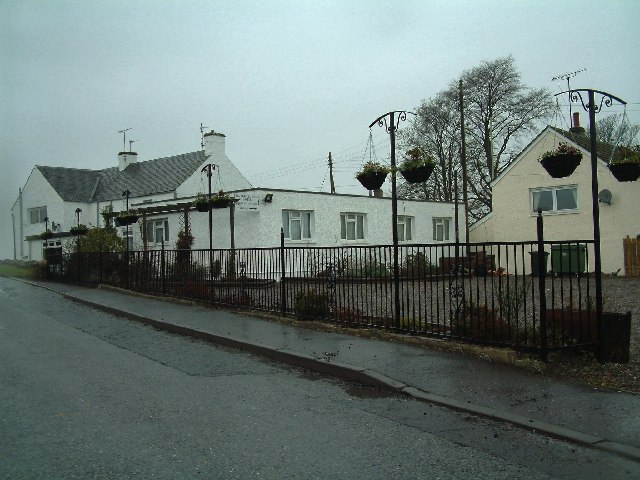
- The MacDonald Arms Hotel, Balbeggie

- Location within Perth and Kinross
- OS grid reference: NO169296
- Council area: Perth and Kinross
- Lieutenancy area: Perth and Kinross
- Country: Scotland
- Sovereign state: United Kingdom
- Post town: PERTH
- Postcode district: PH2
- Dialling code: 01821
- Police: Scotland
- Fire: Scottish
- Ambulance: Scottish
- UK Parliament: Angus and Perthshire Glens
- Scottish Parliament: Perth Mid Scotland and Fife

Balbeggie (/bælˈbɛɡi/) is a village in Perth and Kinross, Scotland about 7 miles (11 kilometres) northeast of Perth on the A94 road.
