= Tom Ledgerwood =

Scottish footballer

Tommy Ledgerwood
Personal information
- Full name: Thomas Ledgerwood
- Date of birth: 15 February 1923
- Place of birth: Coldstream, Scotland
- Date of death: February 13, 2006 (aged 82)
- Place of death: Shotts, Scotland
- Position: Goalkeeper

Senior career*
Years	Team	Apps	(Gls)
- Coldstream
1946–1959	Partick Thistle	216	(1)
1959	→ Greenock Morton (loan)	3	(0)
Total		219	(1)

International career
1952	Scotland B	1	(0)
1952	Scottish League XI	1	(0)
- * Club domestic league appearances and goals

Thomas Ledgerwood (15 February 1923 – 13 February 2006) was a professional footballer who played for Partick Thistle and Greenock Morton in the Scottish Football League.

He made a total of 338 appearances for Partick in all competitions and scored one goal – after being injured against Heart of Midlothian and placed on the wing he soon scored a goal to halve a 3–1 deficit, with his team going on to win 5–4. He won the Glasgow Cup on two occasions and appeared in three Scottish League Cup finals, but finished on the losing side each time.

At representative level, Ledgerwood was selected once each for the Scottish Football League XI and the Scotland B team, both in 1952.

== See also ==
- List of goalscoring goalkeepers
