= Jimmy Davidson (footballer, born 1925) =

Scottish footballer

Personal information
- Full name: James Anderson Davidson
- Date of birth: 8 November 1925
- Place of birth: Douglas Water, South Lanarkshire, Scotland
- Date of death: 24 January 1996 (aged 70)
- Position: Centre half

Senior career*
Years	Team	Apps	(Gls)
1945–1960	Partick Thistle	274	(29)
1960–1963	Inverness Caledonian		

International career
1952–1954	Scottish Football League XI	4	(0)
1952	Scotland B	1	(0)
1954–1955	Scotland	8	(1)
- * Club domestic league appearances and goals

James Anderson Davidson (8 November 1925 – 24 January 1996) was a Scottish footballer who played for Partick Thistle, Inverness Caledonian and the Scotland national team.

Davidson joined Partick Thistle in 1945 and played for the Maryhill club for the next 15 years. During this time he helped the side to three League Cup finals (all lost) and gained selection to the Scottish League representative side four times. He also earned a total of eight caps for Scotland between 1954 and 1955, scoring once in a 2–2 draw with Northern Ireland in November 1954. He was part of the side which made Scotland's first appearance in the FIFA World Cup finals, in Switzerland in 1954.

Davidson left Partick in 1960, joining Highland League side Inverness Caledonian for three seasons. Upon his playing retirement he rejoined Partick as groundsman. His brother Andy was also a professional footballer, who holds the most appearances record for Hull City.
