= Johnny MacKenzie =

Scottish footballer

Personal information
- Full name: John Archie MacKenzie
- Date of birth: 4 September 1925
- Place of birth: Dennistoun, Scotland
- Date of death: 5 July 2017 (aged 91)
- Place of death: Tiree, Inner Hebrides, Scotland
- Position: Outside right

Youth career
- 1943–1944: Petershill

Senior career*
Years	Team	Apps	(Gls)
1944–1947	Partick Thistle	0	(0)
1947–1948	Bournemouth & Boscombe Athletic	38	(9)
1948–1960	Partick Thistle	259	(34)
1958	Fulham	0	(0)
1960–1962	Dumbarton	46	(11)
1962–1965	Derry City	38	(17)
Total		325	(50)

International career
1953–1955	Scotland	9	(1)
1949–1953	Scottish Football League XI	2	(1)
1955	Scotland A vs B trial	1	(0)
- * Club domestic league appearances and goals

John Archie MacKenzie (also spelled McKenzie; 4 September 1925 – 5 July 2017) was a Scottish footballer who spent most of his career with Partick Thistle, where he was known as the "Firhill Flyer".

== Career ==
=== Club ===
An outside right, he joined Partick Thistle from Petershill in 1944 and played most of the next 16 years with the Maryhill club. He played for Bournemouth & Boscombe Athletic during the 1947-48 season whilst on military service in Dorset but became a first-team regular upon his return to Partick Thistle. During his career he helped the Jags side to three Scottish League Cup finals in 1953, 1956 and 1958, but they lost on each occasion.

MacKenzie briefly left Partick in March 1958, when he signed for Fulham for £1,000, but he returned three months later. He left the club for good in 1960, going on to play for Dumbarton and Derry City, where he won his only medal in the 1964 Irish Cup. He was briefly a trainer with Third Lanark, joining in January 1967, but the club folded later that year.

=== International ===
MacKenzie was capped nine times by the Scotland national team, and was part of the squad which travelled to Switzerland for the 1954 FIFA World Cup. He scored his only international goal in a 1–1 draw with Norway in May 1954. The highlight of his international career was arguably against Hungary – the number one rated team in the world at the time – on 8 December 1954; during the game MacKenzie repeatedly beat his opponent Mihály Lantos, and afterwards Ferenc Puskás complimented him, stating that he had "never seen wing play of such a high standard".

== Personal life ==
MacKenzie is, to date, the only native Gaelic-speaker to have played for Scotland, although others may have had knowledge of the language (Peter Campbell and Moses McNeil, who founded Rangers, and Andy McCombie). MacKenzie also represented the Scottish League.

He died in July 2017, aged 91.

== See also ==
- List of Scottish Gaelic-speaking people
