= 1929–30 in Scottish football =

Football in Scotland
- Season: 1929–30

1929–30 in Scottish football

Division One champions
- Rangers

Division Two champions
- Leith Athletic

Scottish Cup winners
- Rangers

Junior Cup winners
- Newtongrange Star

Scotland national team
- 1930 BHC

The 1929–30 season was the 57th season of competitive football in Scotland and the 40th season of the Scottish Football League.

== League competitions ==
=== Scottish League Division One ===
Pos	Team	Pld	W	D	L	GF	GA	GD	Pts
1	Rangers	38	28	4	6	94	32	+62	60
2	Motherwell	38	25	5	8	104	48	+56	55
3	Aberdeen	38	23	7	8	85	61	+24	53
4	Celtic	38	22	5	11	88	46	+42	49
5	St Mirren	38	18	5	15	73	56	+17	41
6	Partick Thistle	38	16	9	13	72	61	+11	41
7	Falkirk	38	16	9	13	62	64	−2	41
8	Kilmarnock	38	15	9	14	77	73	+4	39
9	Ayr United	38	16	6	16	70	92	−22	38
10	Heart of Midlothian	38	14	9	15	69	69	0	37
11	Clyde	38	13	11	14	64	69	−5	37
12	Airdrieonians	38	16	4	18	60	66	−6	36
13	Hamilton Academical	38	14	7	17	76	81	−5	35
14	Dundee	38	14	6	18	51	58	−7	34
15	Queen's Park	38	15	4	19	67	80	−13	34
16	Cowdenbeath	38	13	7	18	64	74	−10	33
17	Hibernian	38	9	11	18	45	62	−17	29
18	Morton	38	10	7	21	67	95	−28	27
19	Dundee United	38	7	8	23	56	109	−53	22
20	St Johnstone	38	6	7	25	48	96	−48	19

Source: "1929-1930 Division 1 - SPFL Archive". SPFL.

Champions: Rangers
Relegated: Dundee United, St Johnstone

=== Scottish League Division Two ===
Pos	Team	Pld	W	D	L	GF	GA	GD	Pts	Promotion or relegation
1	Leith Athletic	38	23	11	4	92	42	+50	57	Promotion to the 1930–31 First Division
2	East Fife	38	26	5	7	114	58	+56	57	Promotion to the 1930–31 First Division
3	Albion Rovers	38	24	6	8	101	60	+41	54	
4	Third Lanark	38	23	6	9	92	53	+39	52	
5	Raith Rovers	38	18	8	12	94	67	+27	44	
6	King's Park	38	17	8	13	109	80	+29	42	
7	Queen of the South	38	18	6	14	65	63	+2	42	
8	Forfar Athletic	38	18	5	15	98	95	+3	41	
9	Arbroath	38	16	7	15	83	87	−4	39	
10	Dunfermline Athletic	38	16	6	16	99	85	+14	38	
11	Montrose	38	14	10	14	79	87	−8	38	
12	East Stirlingshire	38	16	4	18	83	75	+8	36	
13	Bo'ness	38	15	4	19	67	95	−28	34	
14	St Bernard's	38	13	6	19	65	65	0	32	
15	Armadale	38	13	5	20	56	91	−35	31	
16	Dumbarton	38	14	2	22	77	95	−18	30	
17	Stenhousemuir	38	11	5	22	75	108	−33	27	
18	Clydebank	38	7	10	21	66	92	−26	24	
19	Alloa Athletic	38	9	6	23	55	104	−49	24	
20	Brechin City	38	7	4	27	57	125	−68	18	

Promoted: Leith Athletic, East Fife

== Other honours ==
=== National ===
Competition	Winner	Score	Runner-up
Scottish Cup	Rangers	2 – 1 (Note: Replay needed.)	Partick Thistle
Scottish Qualifying Cup	Bathgate	1 – 0	St Cuthbert Wanderers
Scottish Junior Cup	Newtongrange Star	3 – 0	Hall Russell
Scottish Amateur Cup	Murrayfield Amateurs	2 – 0	Gourock HFSP
Queen's Park Shield	Aberdeen University		

=== County ===
Competition	Winner	Score	Runner-up
Aberdeenshire Cup	Aberdeen	7 – 5 (Note: Aggregate score over two legs.)	Fraserburgh
Ayrshire Cup	Kilmarnock	3 – 1	Beith
Dumbartonshire Cup	Dumbarton	6 – 2	Clydebank
East of Scotland Shield	Hearts	1 – 1 (Note: Replay needed – won on corners.)	Hibernian
Fife Cup	Raith Rovers	3 – 2	East Fife
Forfarshire Cup	Dundee United	2 – 1	Montrose
Glasgow Cup	Rangers	4–0 (Note: Replay needed.)	Celtic
Lanarkshire Cup	Motherwell	1 – 0	Albion Rovers
North of Scotland Cup	Ross County	2 – 0	Elgin City
Perthshire Cup	St Johnstone	7 – 2	Killin
Renfrewshire Cup	St Mirren	3 – 0	Greenock HSFP
Southern Counties Cup	St Cuthbert Wanderers	4 – 1	Newton Stewart
Stirlingshire Cup	Falkirk	4 – 0	Stenhousemuir

=== Non-league honours ===
Highland League

Top Three
Pos	Team	Pld	W	D	L	GF	GA	GD	Pts
1	Huntly	22	17	1	4	65	31	+34	35
2	Elgin City	22	15	3	4	72	37	+35	33
3	Inverness Thistle	22	15	3	4	70	37	+33	33

Source: SFHA

East of Scotland League

Top Three
Pos	Team	Pld	W	D	L	GF	GA	GD	Pts
1	Bathgate	27	22	4	1	88	29	+59	48
2	Edinburgh City	30	19	5	6	86	34	+52	43
3	Cameron Highlanders1	28	19	1	8	92	60	+32	39

Source: SFHA

== Scotland national team ==
Date	Venue	Opponents	Score	Competition	Scotland scorer(s)
26 October 1929	Ninian Park, Cardiff (A)	Wales	4–2	BHC	Hughie Gallacher (2), Alex James, Jimmy Gibson
22 February 1930	Celtic Park, Glasgow (H)	Ireland	3–1	BHC	Hughie Gallacher (2), George Stevenson
5 April 1930	Wembley Stadium, London (A)	England	2–5	BHC	Jimmy Fleming (2)
18 May 1930	Stade de Colombes Paris (A)	France	2–0	Friendly	Hughie Gallacher (2)

Key:

- (H) = Home match
- (A) = Away match
- BHC = British Home Championship

== Other national teams ==
=== Scottish League XI ===
Date	Venue	Opponents	Score (Note: Scottish League XI's score is shown first.)	Scotland scorer(s)
9 October 1929	Windsor Park, Belfast (A)	(Northern Ireland) Irish League XI	4–1	
2 November 1929	Ibrox, Glasgow (A)	(England) Football League XI	2–1	

=== Scottish national amateur team ===
Date	Venue	Opponents	Score (Note: Scotland amateur team's score is shown first.)	Competition	Scotland scorer(s)
12 October 1929	Brandywell, Derry (A)	Northern Ireland	3–0	Friendly	
8 February 1930	Hampden Park, Glasgow (H)	Wales	1–0	Friendly	
15 March 1930	Hampden Park, Glasgow (H)	England	1–0	Friendly	
