= 1927–28 in Scottish football =

Football in Scotland
- Season: 1927–28

1927–28 in Scottish football

Division One champions
- Rangers

Division Two champions
- Ayr United

Scottish Cup winners
- Rangers

Junior Cup winners
- Maryhill Hibs

Scotland national team
- 1928 BHC

The 1927–28 season was the 55th season of competitive football in Scotland and the 38th season of the Scottish Football League.

== League competitions ==
=== Scottish League Division One ===
Pos	Team	Pld	W	D	L	GF	GA	GD	Pts
1	Rangers	38	26	8	4	109	36	+73	60
2	Celtic	38	23	9	6	93	39	+54	55
3	Motherwell	38	23	9	6	92	46	+46	55
4	Heart of Midlothian	38	20	7	11	89	50	+39	47
5	St Mirren	38	18	8	12	77	76	+1	44
6	Partick Thistle	38	18	7	13	85	67	+18	43
7	Aberdeen	38	19	5	14	71	61	+10	43
8	Kilmarnock	38	15	10	13	68	78	−10	40
9	Cowdenbeath	38	16	7	15	66	68	−2	39
10	Falkirk	38	16	5	17	76	69	+7	37
11	St Johnstone	38	14	8	16	66	67	−1	36
12	Hibernian	38	13	9	16	73	75	−2	35
13	Airdrieonians	38	12	11	15	59	69	−10	35
14	Dundee	38	14	7	17	65	80	−15	35
15	Clyde	38	10	11	17	46	72	−26	31
16	Queen's Park	38	12	6	20	69	80	−11	30
17	Raith Rovers	38	11	7	20	60	89	−29	29
18	Hamilton Academical	38	11	6	21	67	86	−19	28
19	Bo'ness	38	9	8	21	48	86	−38	26
20	Dunfermline Athletic	38	4	4	30	41	126	−85	12

Source: "1927-1928 Division 1 - SPFL Archive". SPFL.

Champions: Rangers
Relegated: Boness United, Dunfermline Athletic

=== Scottish League Division Two ===
Pos	Team	Pld	W	D	L	GF	GA	GD	Pts	Promotion or relegation
1	Ayr United (P)	38	24	6	8	117	60	+57	54	Promotion to the 1928–29 First Division
2	Third Lanark (P)	38	18	9	11	101	66	+35	45	Promotion to the 1928–29 First Division
3	King's Park	38	16	12	10	84	68	+16	44	
4	East Fife	38	18	7	13	87	73	+14	43	
5	Forfar Athletic	38	18	7	13	83	73	+10	43	
6	Dundee United	38	17	9	12	81	73	+8	43	
7	Arthurlie	38	18	4	16	85	90	−5	40	
8	Albion Rovers	38	17	4	17	79	69	+10	38	
9	East Stirlingshire	38	14	10	14	84	76	+8	38	
10	Arbroath	38	16	4	18	84	86	−2	36	
11	Dumbarton	38	16	4	18	66	72	−6	36	
12	Queen of the South	38	15	6	17	92	106	−14	36	
13	Leith Athletic	38	13	9	16	76	71	+5	35	
14	Clydebank	38	16	3	19	78	80	−2	35	
15	Alloa Athletic	38	12	11	15	72	76	−4	35	
16	Stenhousemuir	38	15	5	18	75	82	−7	35	
17	St Bernard's	38	15	5	18	75	103	−28	35	
18	Morton	38	13	8	17	65	82	−17	34	
19	Bathgate	38	10	11	17	62	81	−19	31	
20	Armadale	38	8	8	22	53	112	−59	24	

(P) Promoted

Promoted: Ayr United, Third Lanark

== Other honours ==
=== National ===
Competition	Winner	Score	Runner-up
Scottish Cup	Rangers	4 – 0	Celtic
Scottish Qualifying Cup	Beith	3 – 1	Forres Mechanics
Scottish Junior Cup	Maryhill Hibernian	6 – 2	Burnbank Athletic
Scottish Amateur Cup	Queen's Park Victoria XI (Note: The Victoria XI were the fourth XI of Queen's Park.)	6 – 1	Anchor Line
Queen's Park Shield	Aberdeen University		

=== County ===
Competition	Winner	Score	Runner-up
Aberdeenshire Cup	Aberdeen	8 – 3 (Note: Aggregate over two legs.)	Fraserburgh
Ayrshire Cup	Kilmarnock v Beith		
Dumbartonshire Cup	Clydebank	4 – 2 (Note: Replay needed.)	Dumbarton
East of Scotland Shield	Hibernian	2 – 1	Hearts
Fife Cup	Cowdenbeath	2 – 1	Dunfermline Athletic
Glasgow Cup	Celtic	2 – 1	Rangers
Lanarkshire Cup	Motherwell	4 – 1	Airdrie
North of Scotland Cup	Caledonian	2 – 1 (Note: Second replay needed.)	Inverness Thistle
Perthshire Cup	St Johnstone	3 – 0	Vale of Atholl
Southern Counties Cup	Nithsdale Wanderers	8 – 0	Newton Stewart
Stirlingshire Cup	East Stirling	1 – 0	Bo'ness

=== Non-league honours ===
Highland League

Top Three
Pos	Team	Pld	W	D	L	GF	GA	GD	Pts
1	Buckie Thistle	18	12	4	2	49	21	+28	28
2	Clachnacuddin	18	12	2	4	40	28	+12	26
3	Forres Mechanics	18	12	1	5	65	30	+35	25

Source: SFHA

East of Scotland League

Top Three
Pos	Team	Pld	W	D	L	GF	GA	GD	Pts
1	Berwick Rangers	14	13	1	0	54	12	+42	27
2	Civil Service Strollers	14	7	4	3	30	21	+9	18
3	Leith Amateurs	14	8	1	5	38	27	+11	17

Source: SFHA

== Scotland national team ==
Date	Venue	Opponents	Score	Competition	Scotland scorer(s)
29 October 1927	Racecourse Ground, Wrexham (A)	Wales	2–2	BHC	Hugh Gallacher, John Hutton (pen.)
25 February 1928	Firhill, Glasgow (H)	Ireland	0–1	BHC	
31 March 1928	Wembley, London (A)	England	5–1	BHC	Alex Jackson (3), Alex James (2)

Key:

== Other national teams ==
=== Scottish League XI ===
Date	Venue	Opponents	Score (Note: Scottish League XI's score is shown first.)	Scotland scorer(s)
12 October 1927	Windsor Park, Belfast (A)	(Northern Ireland) Irish League XI	2–1	
10 March 1928	Ibrox, Glasgow (H)	(England) Football League XI	2–6	

=== Scottish national amateur team ===
Date	Venue	Opponents	Score (Note: Scotland amateur team's score is shown first.)	Competition	Scotland scorer(s)
28 April 1928	Hampden Park, Glasgow (H)	England	3–2	Friendly	
