= 1925–26 in Scottish football =

Football in Scotland
- Season: 1925–26

1925–26 in Scottish football

Division One champions
- Celtic

Division Two champions
- Dunfermline Athletic

Division Three champions
- Championship withheld

Scottish Cup winners
- St Mirren

Junior Cup winners
- Strathclyde

Scotland national team
- 1926 BHC

The 1925–26 season was the 53rd season of competitive football in Scotland and the 36th season of the Scottish Football League.

== League competitions ==
=== Scottish League Division One ===
Pos	Team	Pld	W	D	L	GF	GA	GD	Pts
1	Celtic	38	25	8	5	97	40	+57	58
2	Airdrieonians	38	23	4	11	95	54	+41	50
3	Heart of Midlothian	38	21	8	9	87	56	+31	50
4	St Mirren	38	20	7	11	63	52	+11	47
5	Motherwell	38	19	8	11	67	46	+21	46
6	Rangers	38	19	6	13	79	55	+24	44
7	Cowdenbeath	38	18	6	14	87	68	+19	42
8	Falkirk	38	14	14	10	61	57	+4	42
9	Kilmarnock	38	17	7	14	79	77	+2	41
10	Dundee	38	14	9	15	47	59	−12	37
11	Aberdeen	38	13	10	15	49	54	−5	36
12	Hamilton Academical	38	13	9	16	68	79	−11	35
13	Queen's Park	38	15	4	19	70	81	−11	34
14	Partick Thistle	38	10	13	15	64	73	−9	33
15	Morton	38	12	7	19	57	84	−27	31
16	Hibernian	38	12	6	20	72	77	−5	30
17	Dundee United	38	11	6	21	52	74	−22	28
18	St Johnstone	38	9	10	19	43	78	−35	28
19	Raith Rovers	38	11	4	23	46	81	−35	26
20	Clydebank	38	7	8	23	55	92	−37	22

Source: "1925-1926 Division 1 - SPFL Archive". SPFL.

Champions: Celtic
Relegated: Raith Rovers, Clydebank

=== Scottish League Division Two ===
Pos	Team	Pld	W	D	L	GF	GA	GD	Pts	Promotion or relegation
1	Dunfermline Athletic	38	26	7	5	109	43	+66	59	Promotion to the 1926–27 First Division
2	Clyde	38	24	5	9	87	50	+37	53	Promotion to the 1926–27 First Division
3	Ayr United	38	20	12	6	77	39	+38	52	
4	East Fife	38	20	9	9	98	73	+25	49	
5	Stenhousemuir	38	19	10	9	74	52	+22	48	
6	Third Lanark	38	19	8	11	72	47	+25	46	
7	Arthurlie	38	17	5	16	81	75	+6	39	
8	Bo'ness	38	17	5	16	66	70	−4	39	
9	Albion Rovers	38	16	6	16	78	71	+7	38	
10	Arbroath	38	17	4	17	80	73	+7	38	
11	Dumbarton	38	14	10	14	54	78	−24	38	
12	Nithsdale Wanderers	38	15	7	16	78	82	−4	37	
13	King's Park	38	14	9	15	67	73	−6	37	
14	St Bernard's	38	15	5	18	86	82	+4	35	
15	Armadale	38	14	5	19	82	101	−19	33	
16	Alloa Athletic	38	11	8	19	54	63	−9	30	
17	Queen Of The South	38	10	8	20	64	88	−24	28	
18	East Stirlingshire	38	10	7	21	59	89	−30	27	
19	Bathgate	38	7	6	25	60	105	−45	20	
20	Broxburn United	38	4	6	28	55	127	−72	14	Left the League

Promoted: Dunfermline Athletic, Clyde
Relegated: Broxburn United

=== Scottish League Division Three ===
Pos	Team	Pld	W	D	L	GF	GA	GR	Pts	Promotion or relegation
1	Helensburgh	30	16	6	8	66	47	1.404	38	
2	Leith Athletic	29	16	5	8	73	41	1.780	37	
3	Forfar Athletic (P)	28	16	3	9	61	42	1.452	35	Elected to the 1926–27 Scottish Division Two
4	Dykehead	28	14	5	9	62	47	1.319	33	
5	Royal Albert	28	16	1	11	75	61	1.230	33	
6	Mid-Annandale	29	14	3	12	50	54	0.926	31	
7	Vale of Leven	26	14	2	10	78	55	1.418	30	
8	Montrose	26	12	3	11	56	58	0.966	27	
9	Lochgelly United	29	9	9	11	58	63	0.921	27	
10	Brechin City	28	12	3	13	67	73	0.918	27	
11	Solway Star	29	9	6	14	50	62	0.806	24	
12	Beith	27	9	4	14	58	68	0.853	22	
13	Johnstone	29	7	6	16	55	74	0.743	20	
14	Peebles Rovers	26	9	0	17	52	76	0.684	18	
15	Clackmannan	25	5	8	12	42	74	0.568	18	
16	Galston	15	4	4	7	38	46	0.826	12	

Source: statto.com
Rules for classification: Teams are ranked by points then goal average. Points system: 2 points for a win, 1 point for a draw, 0 points for a loss
(P) Promoted

Elected to Division Two: Forfar Athletic

Since multiple clubs were unable to complete their fixtures due to financial difficulties, the championship was withheld. Consequently, the Third Division was dissolved, not being re-established until the 1946–47 season.

Eight of the 16 clubs that competed in the unfinished season are now defunct; of the remainder, Forfar Athletic and Montrose play in the league as of 2025, with Brechin City, Leith Athletic, Mid-Annandale, Peebles Rovers, Royal Albert and Vale of Leven playing in lower levels.

== Other honours ==
=== National ===
Competition	Winner	Score	Runner-up
Scottish Cup	St Mirren	2 – 0	Celtic
Scottish Qualifying Cup	Leith Athletic	3 – 1	Solway Star
Scottish Junior Cup	Strathclyde	2 – 0	Bridgeton Waverley
Scottish Amateur Cup	Murrayfield Amateurs	7 – 0	Leith Amateurs
Queen's Park Shield	St Andrews University		

=== County ===
Competition	Winner	Score	Runner-up
Aberdeenshire Cup	Aberdeen	7 – 2 (Note: Aggregate score over two legs.)	Peterhead
Ayrshire Cup	Ayr United	4 – 1	Beith
Dumbartonshire Cup	Helensburgh	3 – 1	Dumbarton
East of Scotland Shield	Hibernian	2 – 1	Hearts
Fife Cup	Cowdenbeath	4 – 1 (Note: Replay needed.)	Lochgelly United
Forfarshire Cup	Dundee	4 – 2	Arbroath
Glasgow Cup	Clyde	2 – 1	Celtic
Linlithgowshire Cup	Bo'ness	3 – 1	Bathgate
North of Scotland Cup	Caledonian	3 – 2	Inverness Thistle
Perthshire Cup	St Johnstone	6 – 1	Vale of Atholl
Renfrewshire Cup	St Mirren	6 – 1	Arthurlie
Southern Counties Cup	Stranraer	1 – 0	St Cuthbert Wanderers
Stirlingshire Cup	Falkirk	2 – 1	Stenhousemuir

=== Non-league honours ===
Highland League

Top Three
Pos	Team	Pld	W	D	L	GF	GA	GD	Pts
1	Inverness Caledonian	18	14	2	2	69	27	+42	30
2	Inverness Thistle	18	13	1	4	59	22	+37	27
3	Elgin City	18	12	1	5	48	39	+9	25

Source: SFHA

East of Scotland League

Top Three
Pos	Team	Pld	W	D	L	GF	GA	GD	Pts
1	Civil Service Strollers	12	9	1	2	32	15	+17	19
2	Gala Fairydean	12	8	0	4	39	31	+8	16
3	Leith Amateurs	12	7	1	4	40	28	+12	15

Source: SFHA

== Scotland national team ==
Date	Venue	Opponents	Score	Competition	Scotland scorer(s)
31 October 1925	Ninian Park, Cardiff (A)	Wales	3–0	BHC	John Duncan, Adam McLean, William Clunas
27 February 1926	Ibrox Park, Glasgow (H)	Ireland	4–0	BHC	Hughie Gallacher (3), Andy Cunningham
17 April 1926	Old Trafford, Manchester (A)	England	1–0	BHC	Alex Jackson

Scotland was winner of the 1925–26 British Home Championship.

Key:

- (H) = Home match
- (A) = Away match
- BHC = British Home Championship

== Other national teams ==
=== Scottish League XI ===
Date	Venue	Opponents	Score (Note: Scottish League XI's score is shown first.)	Scotland scorer(s)
11 November 1925	Solitude, Belfast (H)	(Northern Ireland) Irish League XI	7–3	
13 March 1926	Celtic Park, Glasgow (H)	(England) Football League XI	0–2	
