= 1922–23 in Scottish football =

Football in Scotland
- Season: 1922–23

1922–23 in Scottish football

Division One champions
- Rangers

Division Two champions
- Queen's Park

Scottish Cup winners
- Celtic

Junior Cup winners
- Musselburgh Bruntonians

Scotland national team
- 1923 BHC

The 1922–23 season was the 50th season of competitive football in Scotland and the 33rd season of the Scottish Football League.

== League competitions ==
=== Scottish League Division One ===
Pos	Team	Pld	W	D	L	GF	GA	GD	Pts
1	Rangers	38	23	9	6	67	29	+38	55
2	Airdrieonians	38	20	10	8	58	38	+20	50
3	Celtic	38	19	8	11	52	39	+13	46
4	Falkirk	38	14	17	7	44	32	+12	45
5	Aberdeen	38	15	12	11	46	34	+12	42
6	St Mirren	38	15	12	11	54	44	+10	42
7	Dundee	38	17	7	14	51	45	+6	41
8	Hibernian	38	17	7	14	45	40	+5	41
9	Raith Rovers	38	13	13	12	31	43	−12	39
10	Ayr United	38	13	12	13	43	44	−1	38
11	Partick Thistle	38	14	9	15	51	48	+3	37
12	Heart of Midlothian	38	11	15	12	51	50	+1	37
13	Motherwell	38	13	10	15	59	60	−1	36
14	Morton	38	12	11	15	44	47	−3	35
15	Kilmarnock	38	14	7	17	57	66	−9	35
16	Clyde	38	12	9	17	36	44	−8	33
17	Third Lanark	38	11	8	19	40	59	−19	30
18	Hamilton Academical	38	11	7	20	43	59	−16	29
19	Albion Rovers	38	8	10	20	38	64	−26	26
20	Alloa Athletic	38	6	11	21	27	52	−25	23

Source: "1922-1923 Division 1 - SPFL Archive". SPFL.

Champions: Rangers
Relegated: Albion Rovers, Alloa Athletic

=== Scottish League Division Two ===
Pos	Team	Pld	W	D	L	GF	GA	GD	Pts	Promotion or relegation
1	Queen's Park	38	24	9	5	73	31	+42	57	Promotion to the 1923–24 Division One
2	Clydebank	38	21	10	7	69	29	+40	52	Promotion to the 1923–24 Division One
3	St Johnstone	38	19	12	7	60	39	+21	48 (Note: 2 points deducted)	
4	Dumbarton	38	17	8	13	61	40	+21	42	
5	Bathgate	38	16	9	13	67	55	+12	41	
6	Armadale	38	15	11	12	63	52	+11	41	
7	Bo'ness	38	12	17	9	48	46	+2	41	
8	Broxburn United	38	14	12	12	42	45	−3	40	
9	East Fife	38	16	7	15	48	42	+6	39	
10	Lochgelly United	38	16	5	17	41	64	−23	37	
11	Cowdenbeath	38	16	6	16	56	52	+4	36	
12	King's Park	38	14	6	18	46	59	−13	34	
13	Dunfermline Athletic	38	11	11	16	46	44	+2	33	
14	Stenhousemuir	38	13	7	18	53	67	−14	33	
15	Forfar Athletic	38	13	7	18	53	73	−20	33	
16	Johnstone	38	13	6	19	41	62	−21	32	
17	Vale of Leven	38	11	8	19	50	59	−9	30	
18	St Bernard's	38	8	15	15	39	50	−11	29	
19	East Stirlingshire	38	10	8	20	48	69	−21	28	Relegated to the 1923–24 Division Three
20	Arbroath	38	8	12	18	45	71	−26	28	

Notes:

Promoted: Queen's Park, Clydebank

== Other honours ==
=== National ===
Competition	Winner	Score	Runner-up
Scottish Cup	Celtic	1 – 0	Hibernian
Scottish Qualifying Cup	Royal Albert	4 – 1	Mid Annandale
Scottish Junior Cup	Musselburgh Bruntonians	2 – 0	Arniston
Scottish Amateur Cup	Falkirk Amateurs	2 – 0	Moorpark Amateurs
Queen's Park Shield	Aberdeen University		

=== County ===
Competition	Winner	Score	Runner-up
Aberdeenshire Cup	Aberdeen	4 – 0	Fraserburgh
Ayrshire Cup	Kilmarnock	5 – 0	Ayr United
Dumbartonshire Cup	Dumbarton	1 – 0	Dumbarton Harp
East of Scotland Shield	Hibernian	2 – 1 (Note: Replay needed.)	Hearts
Fife Cup	Raith Rovers	0 – 0 (Note: Won on corners.)	Cowdenbeath
Forfarshire Cup	Dundee	2 – 0	Forfar Athletic
Glasgow Cup	Rangers	1 – 0	Clyde
Lanarkshire Cup	Airdrie	2 – 0	Motherwell
Linlithgowshire Cup	Broxburn	3 – 0	Armadale
North of Scotland Cup	Clachnacuddin	2 – 0	Inverness Citadel
Perthshire Cup	Vale of Atholl	2 – 0	Breadalbane
Renfrewshire Cup	Morton	7 – 3 (Note: Aggregate score over two legs.)	Johnstone
Southern Counties Cup	Nithsdale Wanderers		
Stirlingshire Cup	Falkirk	2 – 0	Stenhousemuir

=== Non-league honours ===
Highland League

Top three
Pos	Team	Pld	W	D	L	GF	GA	GD	Pts
1	Clachnacuddin	16	11	2	3	47	21	+26	24
2	Elgin City	16	10	3	3	33	16	+17	23
3	Buckie Thistle	16	9	3	4	31	14	+17	21

Source: SFHA

== Scotland national team ==
Date	Venue	Opponents	Score	Competition	Scotland scorer(s)
3 March 1923	Windsor Park, Belfast (A)	Ireland	1–0.	BHC	Andrew Wilson
17 March 1923	Love Street, Paisley (H)	Wales	2–0	BHC	Andrew Wilson (2)
14 April 1923	Hampden Park, Glasgow (H)	England	2–2	BHC	Andrew Cunningham, Andrew Wilson

Scotland were winners of the 1922–23 British Home Championship.

Key:

- (H) = Home match
- (A) = Away match
- BHC = British Home Championship

== Other national teams ==
=== Scottish League XI ===
Date	Venue	Opponents	Score (Note: Scottish League XI's score is shown first.)	Scotland scorer(s)
18 October 1922	Celtic Park, Glasgow (H)	(Northern Ireland) Irish League XI	3–0	
17 February 1923	St James Park, Newcastle (A)	(England) Football League XI	1–2	

== See also ==
- 1922–23 Aberdeen F.C. season
- Lord Provost's Rent Relief Cup
