= 1912–13 in Scottish football =

Football in Scotland
- Season: 1912–13

1912–13 in Scottish football

Division One champions
- Rangers

Division Two champions
- Ayr United

Scottish Cup winners
- Falkirk

Junior Cup winners
- Inverkeithing United

Scotland national team
- 1913 BHC

The 1912–13 season was the 40th season of competitive football in Scotland and the 23rd season of the Scottish Football League.

== League competitions ==
=== Scottish League Division One ===
| Pos | Team | Pld | W | D | L | GF | GA | GD | Pts |
|---|---|---|---|---|---|---|---|---|---|
| 1 | Rangers (C) | 34 | 24 | 5 | 5 | 76 | 41 | +35 | 53 |
| 2 | Celtic | 34 | 22 | 5 | 7 | 53 | 28 | +25 | 49 |
| =3 | Heart of Midlothian | 34 | 17 | 7 | 10 | 71 | 43 | +28 | 41 |
| =3 | Airdrieonians | 34 | 15 | 11 | 8 | 64 | 46 | +18 | 41 |
| 5 | Falkirk | 34 | 14 | 12 | 8 | 56 | 38 | +18 | 40 |
| =6 | Hibernian | 34 | 16 | 5 | 13 | 63 | 54 | +9 | 37 |
| =6 | Motherwell | 34 | 12 | 13 | 9 | 47 | 39 | +8 | 37 |
| =6 | Aberdeen | 34 | 14 | 9 | 11 | 47 | 40 | +7 | 37 |
| 9 | Clyde | 34 | 13 | 9 | 12 | 41 | 44 | −3 | 35 |
| 10 | Hamilton Academical | 34 | 12 | 8 | 14 | 44 | 47 | −3 | 32 |
| 11 | Kilmarnock | 34 | 10 | 11 | 13 | 37 | 54 | −17 | 31 |
| 12 | St Mirren | 34 | 10 | 10 | 14 | 50 | 60 | −10 | 30 |
| =13 | Dundee | 34 | 8 | 13 | 13 | 33 | 46 | −13 | 29 |
| =13 | Morton | 34 | 11 | 7 | 16 | 50 | 59 | −9 | 29 |
| 15 | Third Lanark | 34 | 8 | 12 | 14 | 31 | 41 | −10 | 28 |
| 16 | Raith Rovers | 34 | 8 | 10 | 16 | 46 | 60 | −14 | 26 |
| 17 | Partick Thistle | 34 | 10 | 4 | 20 | 40 | 55 | −15 | 24 |
| 18 | Queen's Park | 34 | 5 | 3 | 26 | 34 | 88 | −54 | 13 |

Source: "1912-1913 Division 1 - SPFL Archive". SPFL.
(C) Champions

Champions: Rangers

=== Scottish League Division Two ===
| Pos | Team | Pld | W | D | L | GF | GA | GD | Pts | Promotion or relegation |
|---|---|---|---|---|---|---|---|---|---|---|
| 1 | Ayr United (C, P) | 26 | 13 | 8 | 5 | 45 | 19 | +26 | 34 | Promoted to the 1913–14 Scottish Division One |
| 2 | Dunfermline Athletic | 26 | 13 | 7 | 6 | 45 | 27 | +18 | 33 | |
| 3 | East Stirlingshire | 26 | 12 | 8 | 6 | 43 | 27 | +16 | 32 | |
| 4 | Abercorn | 26 | 12 | 7 | 7 | 33 | 31 | +2 | 31 | |
| 5 | Cowdenbeath | 26 | 12 | 6 | 8 | 36 | 27 | +9 | 30 | |
| 6 | Dumbarton (P) | 26 | 12 | 5 | 9 | 38 | 30 | +8 | 29 | Promoted to the 1913–14 Scottish Division One |
| 7 | St Bernard's | 26 | 12 | 3 | 11 | 36 | 34 | +2 | 27 | |
| 8 | Johnstone | 26 | 9 | 6 | 11 | 31 | 43 | −12 | 24 | |
| 9 | Albion Rovers | 26 | 10 | 3 | 13 | 38 | 40 | −2 | 23 | |
| 10 | Dundee Hibernian | 26 | 6 | 10 | 10 | 34 | 43 | −9 | 22 | |
| 11 | St Johnstone | 26 | 7 | 7 | 12 | 29 | 38 | −9 | 21 | |
| 11 | Vale of Leven | 26 | 8 | 5 | 13 | 28 | 44 | −16 | 21 | |
| 13 | Arthurlie | 26 | 7 | 5 | 14 | 37 | 49 | −12 | 19 | |
| 14 | Leith Athletic | 26 | 5 | 8 | 13 | 26 | 47 | −21 | 18 | |

Source: statto.com
Rules for classification: Teams finish equal if level on points. Points system: 2 points for a win, 1 point for a draw, 0 points for a loss
(C) Champions; (P) Promoted

== Other honours ==
=== Cup honours ===
==== National ====
| Competition | Winner | Score | Runner-up |
|---|---|---|---|
| Scottish Cup | Falkirk | 2 – 0 | Rovers |
| Scottish Qualifying Cup | Abercorn | 4 – 1 (Note: Replay needed.) | Arbroath |
| Scottish Consolation Cup | Galston | 2 – 0 | Stenhousemuir |
| Scottish Junior Cup | Inverkeithing United | 1 – 0 | Dunipace |
| Scottish Amateur Cup | Leith Amateurs | 1 – 0 | Ardrossan Academy Former Pupils |

==== County ====
| Competition | Winner | Score | Runner-up |
|---|---|---|---|
| Aberdeenshire Cup | Aberdeen | 4 – 0 | Fraserburgh |
| Ayrshire Cup | Galston | 2 – 1 | Ayr United |
| Dumbartonshire Cup | Dumbarton Harp | 1 – 0 | Renton |
| East of Scotland Shield | Hibernian | 3 – 2 | St Bernard's |
| Fife Cup | Kirkcaldy United | 5 – 2 | East Fife |
| Forfarshire Cup | Dundee | 7 – 0 | Montrose |
| Glasgow Cup | Rangers | 3 – 1 | Celtic |
| Lanarkshire Cup | Airdrie | 5 – 1 | Dykehead |
| Linlithgowshire Cup | Armadale | 2 – 1 | Broxburn |
| Perthshire Cup | Dunblane | 3 – 0 | Breadalbane |
| Renfrewshire Cup | Morton | 4 – 3 (Note: Aggregate over two legs.) | St Mirren |
| Southern Counties Cup | Solway Star | 1 – 0 (Note: Third replay needed.) | Dumfries |
| Stirlingshire Cup | Alloa Athletic | 5 – 0 (Note: Second replay needed) | King's Park |

=== Non-league honours ===
Highland League

Top Three
| Pos | Team | Pld | W | D | L | GF | GA | GD | Pts |
|---|---|---|---|---|---|---|---|---|---|
| 1 | Aberdeen 'A' | 16 | 13 | 3 | 0 | 53 | 18 | +35 | 29 |
| 2 | Buckie Thistle | 16 | 9 | 1 | 6 | 20 | 19 | +1 | 19 |
| 3 | Inverness Caledonian | 16 | 8 | 1 | 7 | 34 | 36 | −2 | 17 |

Source: RSSSF

Other Senior Leagues

| Division | Winner |
|---|---|
| Banffshire League | unfinished |
| Border Senior League | unfinished |
| Central League | Alloa Athletic |
| Eastern League | |
| Northern League | Brechin City |
| Perthshire League | unfinished |
| Scottish Union | Dykehead |

== Scotland national team ==
| Date | Venue | Opponents | Score | Competition | Scotland scorer(s) |
|---|---|---|---|---|---|
| 3 March 1913 | Racecourse Ground, Wrexham (A) | Wales | 0–0 | BHC | |
| 15 March 1913 | Dalymount Park, Dublin (A) | Ireland | 2–1 | BHC | Willie Reid, Alex Bennett |
| 5 April 1913 | Stamford Bridge, London (A) | England | 0–1 | BHC | |

Key:

- (H) = Home match
- (A) = Away match
- BHC = British Home Championship

| Team | Pld | W | D | L | GF | GA | GD | Pts |
|---|---|---|---|---|---|---|---|---|
| England (C) | 3 | 2 | 0 | 1 | 6 | 5 | +1 | 4 |
| Wales | 3 | 1 | 1 | 1 | 4 | 4 | 0 | 3 |
| Scotland | 3 | 1 | 1 | 1 | 2 | 2 | 0 | 3 |
| Ireland | 3 | 1 | 0 | 2 | 3 | 4 | −1 | 2 |

Rules for classification: 1) points. The points system worked as follows: 2 points for a win and 1 point for a draw.
(C) Champions

== Other national teams ==
=== Scottish League XI ===
| Date | Venue | Opponents | Score (Note: Scottish League XI's score is shown first.) | Scotland scorer(s) |
|---|---|---|---|---|
| 14 October 1912 | London (A) | (England) Southern League XI | 0–1 | |
| 6 November 1912 | Solitude, Belfast (A) | (Northern Ireland) Irish League XI | 3–1 | |
| 1 March 1913 | Hampden Park, Glasgow (H) | (England) Football League XI | 4–1 | |

== See also ==
- 1912–13 Aberdeen F.C. season
