= 1923–24 in Scottish football =

Football in Scotland
- Season: 1923–24

1923–24 in Scottish football

Division One champions
- Rangers

Division Two champions
- St Johnstone

Division Three champions
- Arthurlie

Scottish Cup winners
- Airdrieonians

Junior Cup winners
- Parkhead

Scotland national team
- 1924 BHC

The 1923–24 season was the 51st season of competitive football in Scotland and the 34th season of the Scottish Football League. A Third Division was introduced adding to Division One and Division Two.

== League competitions ==
=== Scottish League Division One ===
Pos	Team	Pld	W	D	L	GF	GA	GD	Pts
1	Rangers	38	25	9	4	72	22	+50	59
2	Airdrieonians	38	20	10	8	72	46	+26	50
3	Celtic	38	17	12	9	56	33	+23	46
4	Raith Rovers	38	18	7	13	56	38	+18	43
5	Dundee	38	15	13	10	70	57	+13	43
6	St Mirren	38	15	12	11	53	45	+8	42
7	Hibernian	38	15	11	12	66	52	+14	41
8	Partick Thistle	38	15	9	14	58	55	+3	39
9	Heart of Midlothian	38	14	10	14	61	50	+11	38
10	Motherwell	38	15	7	16	58	63	−5	37
11	Morton	38	16	5	17	48	54	−6	37
12	Hamilton Academical	38	15	6	17	52	57	−5	36
13	Aberdeen	38	13	10	15	37	41	−4	36
14	Ayr United	38	12	10	16	38	60	−22	34
15	Falkirk	38	13	6	19	46	53	−7	32
16	Kilmarnock	38	12	8	18	48	65	−17	32
17	Queen's Park	38	11	9	18	43	60	−17	31
18	Third Lanark	38	11	8	19	54	78	−24	30
19	Clyde	38	10	9	19	40	70	−30	29
20	Clydebank	38	10	5	23	42	71	−29	25

Source: "1923-1924 Division 1 - SPFL Archive". SPFL (in Malay).

Champions: Rangers
Relegated: Clyde, Clydebank

=== Scottish League Division Two ===
Pos	Team	Pld	W	D	L	GF	GA	GD	Pts	Promotion or relegation
1	St Johnstone	38	22	12	4	79	31	+48	56	Promotion to the 1924–25 Division One
2	Cowdenbeath	38	23	9	6	78	33	+45	55	Promotion to the 1924–25 Division One
3	Bathgate	38	16	12	10	58	49	+9	44	
4	Stenhousemuir	38	16	11	11	58	45	+13	43	
5	Albion Rovers	38	15	12	11	67	53	+14	42	
6	King's Park	38	16	10	12	67	57	+10	42	
7	Dunfermline Athletic	38	14	11	13	52	46	+6	39	
8	Johnstone	38	16	7	15	60	56	+4	39	
9	Dundee United	38	12	15	11	41	41	0	39	
10	Dumbarton	38	17	5	16	55	56	−1	39	
11	Armadale	38	16	6	16	56	63	−7	38	
12	East Fife	38	14	9	15	54	47	+7	37	
13	Bo'ness	38	13	11	14	45	53	−8	37	
14	Forfar Athletic	38	14	7	17	42	67	−25	35	
15	Broxburn United	38	13	8	17	50	56	−6	34	
16	Alloa Athletic	38	14	6	18	44	53	−9	34	
17	Arbroath	38	12	8	18	49	51	−2	32	
18	St Bernard's	38	11	10	17	49	54	−5	32	
19	Vale of Leven	38	11	9	18	41	67	−26	31	Relegated to the 1924–25 Division Three
20	Lochgelly United	38	4	4	30	21	86	−65	12	Relegated to the 1924–25 Division Three

Promoted: St. Johnstone, Cowdenbeath
Relegated: Vale of Leven, Lochgelly United

=== Scottish League Division Three ===
Pos	Team	Pld	W	D	L	GF	GA	GR	Pts	Promotion or relegation
1	Arthurlie (C, P)	30	21	5	4	59	24	2.458	47	Promoted to the 1924–25 Scottish Division Two
2	East Stirlingshire (P)	30	17	8	5	63	36	1.750	42	Promoted to the 1924–25 Scottish Division Two
3	Queen of the South	30	14	10	6	64	31	2.065	38	
4	Montrose	30	15	6	9	60	48	1.250	36	
5	Dykehead	30	16	1	13	55	41	1.341	33	
6	Nithsdale Wanderers	30	13	7	10	42	35	1.200	33	
7	Beith	30	14	4	12	49	41	1.195	32	
8	Mid-Annandale	30	13	5	12	59	48	1.229	31	
9	Royal Albert	30	12	4	14	44	53	0.830	28	
10	Dumbarton Harp	30	10	8	12	40	51	0.784	28	
11	Solway Star	30	9	9	12	42	48	0.875	27	
12	Clackmannan	30	10	7	13	37	54	0.685	27	
13	Galston	30	11	3	16	53	70	0.757	25	
14	Peebles Rovers	30	7	8	15	43	56	0.768	22	
15	Helensburgh	30	5	7	18	46	72	0.639	17	
16	Brechin City	30	4	6	20	28	76	0.368	14	

Source: statto.com
Rules for classification: Teams are ranked by points then goal average. Points system: 2 points for a win, 1 point for a draw, 0 points for a loss
(C) Champions; (P) Promoted

Promoted: Arthurlie, East Stirlingshire

== Other honours ==
=== National ===
Competition	Winner	Score	Runner-up
Scottish Cup	Airdrieonians	2 – 0	Hibernian
Scottish Qualifying Cup	Queen of the South	3 – 0 (Note: Replay needed.)	Dykehead
Scottish Junior Cup	Parkhead	3 – 1	Baillieston
Scottish Amateur Cup	Moorpark Amateurs	1 – 0	Greenock HSFP
Queen's Park Shield	Glasgow University		

=== County ===
Competition	Winner	Score	Runner-up
Aberdeenshire Cup	Aberdeen	6 – 0	Keith
Ayrshire Cup	Beith	1 – 0	Galston
Dumbartonshire Cup	Clydebank	3 – 2	Dumbarton Harp
East of Scotland Shield	Hibernian	2 – 1	Hearts
Fife Cup	Cowdenbeath	3 – 1	Raith Rovers
Forfarshire Cup	Arbroath	3 – 0	Forfar Athletic
Glasgow Cup	Rangers	3 – 1	Third Lanark
Lanarkshire Cup	Hamilton	3 – 0	Royal Albert
Linlithgowshire Cup	Broxburn	1 – 0	Armadale
North of Scotland Cup	Elgin City	3 – 2	Inverness Thistle
Perthshire Cup	Blairgowrie	3 – 1	Vale of Atholl
Renfrewshire Cup	St Mirren	6 – 1 (Note: Play off needed.)	Arthurlie
Southern Counties Cup	Queen of the South	5 – 2	Stranraer
Stirlingshire Cup	East Stirling	1 – 0	Alloa Athletic

=== Non-league honours ===
Highland League

Top Three
Pos	Team	Pld	W	D	L	GF	GA	GD	Pts
1	Clachnacuddin	16	12	2	2	32	10	+22	26
2	Buckie Thistle	16	9	3	4	36	30	+6	21
3	Elgin City	16	8	4	4	28	20	+8	20

Source: SFHA

East of Scotland League

Top Three
Pos	Team	Pld	W	D	L	GF	GA	GD	Pts
1	Coldstream	12	7	3	2	28	15	+13	17
2	Berwick Rangers	12	6	4	2	25	12	+13	16
3	Gala Fairydean	12	6	1	5	25	19	+6	13

Source: SFHA

== Scotland national team ==
Date	Venue	Opponents	Score	Competition	Scotland scorer(s)
16 February 1924	Ninian Park, Cardiff (A)	Wales	0–2	BHC	
1 March 1924	Celtic Park, Glasgow (H)	Ireland	2–0	BHC	Andrew Cunningham, David Morris
12 April 1924	Wembley Stadium, London (A)	England	1–1	BHC	William Cowan

Key:

- (H) = Home match
- (A) = Away match
- BHC = British Home Championship

== Other national teams ==
=== Scottish League XI ===
Date	Venue	Opponents	Score (Note: Scottish League XI's score is shown first.)	Scotland scorer(s)
31 October 1923	The Oval, Belfast (A)	(Northern Ireland) Irish League XI	1–0	
15 March 1924	Ibrox, Glasgow (H)	(England) Football League XI	1–1	

== See also ==
- 1923–24 Aberdeen F.C. season
