= 1919–20 Hibernian F.C. season =

Hibernian
1919–20 season
- Manager: Davy Gordon
- Scottish Football League: 18th
- Scottish Cup: R2
- Average home league attendance: 13,721 (down 618)

During the 1919–20 season Hibernian, a football club based in Edinburgh, finished eighteenth out of 22 clubs in the Scottish Football League.

== Scottish Football League ==
Match Day	Date	Opponent	H/A	Score	Hibernian Scorer(s)	Attendance
1	16 August	Third Lanark	A	0–2		6,000
2	20 August	Hamilton Academical	H	3–0		6,000
3	23 August	St Mirren	H	2–1		15,000
4	30 August	Motherwell	A	1–3		10,000
5	6 September	Aberdeen	H	2–1		15,000
6	13 September	Airdrieonians	A	0–2		2,000
7	15 September	Heart of Midlothian	H	2–4		18,000
8	20 September	Falkirk	H	2–0		12,000
9	22 September	St Mirren	A	1–2		5,000
10	29 September	Albion Rovers	A	2–1		6,000
11	4 October	Dumbarton	H	3–3		9,000
12	11 October	Celtic	A	3–7		12,000
13	18 October	Partick Thistle	H	6–2		10,000
14	25 October	Ayr United	A	0–1		5,000
15	1 November	Queen's Park	A	2–2		10,000
16	8 November	Raith Rovers	H	2–0		15,000
17	22 November	Clyde	H	1–0		8,000
18	29 November	Morton	H	1–0		12,000
19	6 December	Rangers	A	0–7		14,000
20	13 December	Kilmarnock	H	4–1		11,000
21	20 December	Aberdeen	A	1–1		10,000
22	27 December	Dundee	A	1–3		12,000
23	1 January	Heart of Midlothian	A	3–1		22,000
24	3 January	Clydebank	H	2–0		12,000
25	10 January	Falkirk	A	0–3		5,000
26	17 January	Ayr United	H	1–2		12,000
27	14 February	Dumbarton	A	0–2		3,000
28	17 February	Clyde	A	0–2		3,000
29	21 February	Hamilton Academical	A	2–3		6,000
30	28 February	Kilmarnock	A	1–4		5,000
31	6 March	Motherwell	H	0–1		10,000
32	13 March	Albion Rovers	H	0–1		6,000
33	20 March	Clydebank	A	3–3		4,000
34	27 March	Airdrieonians	H	1–4		10,000
35	3 April	Third Lanark	H	1–2		5,000
36	10 April	Morton	A	1–1		6,000
37	14 April	Partick Thistle	A	0–1		8,000
38	17 April	Raith Rovers	A	0–1		4,000
39	19 April	Celtic	H	1–2		20,000
40	21 April	Rangers	H	1–1		12,000
41	24 April	Queen's Park	H	3–2		10,000
42	1 May	Dundee	H	0–0		7,000

=== Final League table ===
P	Team	Pld	W	D	L	GF	GA	GD	Pts
17	Aberdeen	42	11	13	18	46	64	–18	35
18	Hibernian	42	13	7	22	60	79	–19	33
19	Raith Rovers	42	11	10	61	83	–22	–32	32

=== Scottish Cup ===
Round	Date	Opponent	H/A	Score	Hibernian Scorer(s)	Attendance
R1	24 January	Galston	A	0–0		3,000
R1 R	31 January	Galston	H	2–1		12,000
R2	7 February	Armadale	A	0–1		6,000

== See also ==
- List of Hibernian F.C. seasons
