= Hughie Gallacher =

Scottish footballer

Personal information
- Full name: Hugh Kilpatrick Gallacher
- Date of birth: 2 February 1903
- Place of birth: Bellshill, Scotland
- Date of death: 11 June 1957 (aged 54)
- Place of death: Gateshead, England
- Position: Centre forward

Senior career*
Years	Team	Apps	(Gls)
- Tannochside Athletic
1919	Hattonrigg Thistle		
1920	Bellshill Athletic		
1921	Queen of the South		
1921–1925	Airdrieonians	111	(91)
1925–1930	Newcastle United	160	(133)
1930–1934	Chelsea	132	(72)
1934–1936	Derby County	51	(38)
1936–1937	Notts County	45	(32)
1937–1938	Grimsby Town	12	(3)
1938–1939	Gateshead	34	(18)
Total		527	(377)

International career
1924–1935	Scotland	20	(24 (Note: There is some uncertainty over one of his international goals, the sixth in the 7–3 win over Ireland in 1929: both Hughie Gallacher (who had already scored four times) and Alex James went for the ball at the same point. Correspondence between Queen of the South FC and the Scottish Football Museum in 2016 favoured Gallacher, stating "Hughie himself was insistent that the goal was his, claiming that as he and Alex James (who was a good friend of his) were of a similar build (and of course in 1929 there were no numbers on the jerseys), it was easy for pressmen to make a mistake". James remains credited with the goal in some sources (including the Scottish Football Association website profiles as of 2021) while others such as the Scottish Football Hall of Fame include the contradictory statement that Gallacher's total was 23 goals but that he scored a record five in a match against Ireland.))
1925	Scottish League XI	2	(6)
- * Club domestic league appearances and goals

Hugh Kilpatrick Gallacher (2 February 1903 – 11 June 1957) was a Scottish football player in the 1920s and 1930s. In 597 senior club games, Gallacher scored 419 goals, playing league football for Airdrieonians, Newcastle United, Chelsea, Derby County, Notts County, Grimsby Town and Gateshead. Prior to this he also played and scored for then non-league Queen of the South.

He is one of the Scotland national football team's most prolific goalscorers with 24 goals from his 20 internationals, a strike rate of more than a goal a game. Gallacher was one of the Wembley Wizards who beat England 5–1 at Wembley Stadium in 1928.

== Early and personal life ==
Gallacher was born in Bellshill, Lanarkshire in 1903. He started "biffing a twopenny ball" almost as soon as he could walk. He began a long friendship with Alex James when both were students at Bellshill Academy.

His Irish father had moved to Scotland in search of work in the vast coal mining areas the country had to offer. He soon settled and married a local woman, raising a family with a strict Protestant upbringing. This didn't stop the diminutive Gallacher son from having Catholic friends.

He had been down the Hattonrig Pit at the age of 15, working 10-hour shifts. Aged 16, he left Lanarkshire junior league side Tannochside Athletic to join Hattonrigg Thistle. However fate played a part in his next move up the football ladder. As a spectator he attended to watch Bellshill Athletic (who had previously rejected Gallacher and James for being too small) playing St Mirren Juniors. Bellshill were a man short and Gallacher was asked to play. After hitting his side's goal in the 1–1 draw, he was asked to join the club.

He was barely 17 when he met and married Annie McIlvaney, a girl who worked at the pit where he worked as a miner. The marriage broke up within a few years, although Annie refused to grant Hughie a divorce. Their dispute generated large legal fees, which contributed to his bankruptcy. During his early life Hughie had three children; Hughie (Jr), who died before his first birthday, Catherine (both to Annie McIllvaney) and Jackie Gallacher, who scored prolifically for Celtic in the 1940s.

Soon after he moved to Newcastle in 1925, Hughie met and fell in love with Hannah Anderson, a 17-year-old daughter of the landlord of one of his favourite pubs. They married soon after he divorced from Annie, and they had three sons.

== Club career ==
=== Queen of the South ===
In December 1920, Gallacher was picked for the Glasgow Junior League XI to play against the Irish Intermediate League XI at Shawfield. Gallacher hit the Glasgow equaliser with a fine header with two minutes remaining in the 1–1 draw. Among those at the game was James Jolly, secretary of Dumfries club Queen of the South.

Jolly approached Gallacher after the game and offered him a trial at Queens, with the prospect of a £30 signing-on fee and £5 per week plus expenses should he do well in the trial. At the time Queens were in their second season after formation and, cup games aside, played only local fixtures. However it was professional football and that was good enough for Gallacher. His name on the team sheet replaced Ian Dickson who was on his way to Aston Villa (they were two of the four players to play in Queens' first three seasons before moving on to successful careers in England's top division, the others being Dave Halliday and Willie Ferguson).

Rejecting the opportunity of an international trial game at Methil, Gallacher made his Queen of the South debut aged 17 against St Cuthbert Wanderers on 29 January 1921. He scored four goals in a 7–0 victory. The Herald and Courier wrote after the game, "Gallacher was the pick of the front line. He is only a young player but knows all that is required of him in the centre. He gathers the ball to perfection and possesses a first time shot of a deadly nature. His four goals were all well taken and it was not his fault that he did not have more". The contract was waiting for Gallacher after the game.

Gallacher's next game was his senior debut, a Scottish Cup second round tie against Nithsdale Wanderers. Queens lost 3–1. In the 5–2 victory over Dumbarton, the Herald and Courier said of Gallacher, "From the first kick until the last, he showed exceptional dash and had the unusual record of scoring all five goals. He was continuously the source of great danger and showed no mercy with his rocket shooting".

While enjoying a holiday in Dumfries, Gallacher took ill with double pneumonia. Doctors believed that he would never play football again, but a week later he was said to be recovering well. While in Dumfries Infirmary he was approached by directors of Airdrieonians who had noted his performance in a recent challenge game. At this time if a player was not playing league football at any time then he was free to sign for whoever offered a contract. Airdrie offered a contract and Gallacher signed without a second thought.

In his nine games for Queens Gallacher hit 19 goals, with the game against Hawick on 13 April 1921 being his last. He however returned to Palmerston Park many times to play in and referee charity matches. He was also among the jubilant crowd who watched Queens win in their 1929–30 season-ending 2–1 Charity Cup final win against Mid-Annandale.

=== Airdrieonians ===
Gallacher moved back to North Lanarkshire with a transfer to Airdrieonians. On 19 September 1921 he made his senior Scottish Football League debut in a 2–0 defeat to Raith Rovers. Gallacher was selected for the first team 15 times that season and hit seven goals. He also helped Airdrie reserves to the Second XI Cup. The following season he became a first team mainstay as the club finished second. The next season they finished second again, with Gallacher hitting five in a 6–1 win over Clyde that briefly had the Diamonds top of the league. Silverware arrived when Airdrie beat Hibernian 2–0 in the 1924 Scottish Cup Final to claim the club's first senior trophy. In 1925–26 Airdrie had their third straight second place league finish; Gallacher was credited with 35 goals.

Gallacher was only 5 ft 5 ins tall and was often on the receiving end of rough treatment. However, because he tended to seek his own retribution, he was often in trouble with the authorities. There was much speculation about a number of English clubs that were out to sign him. The Airdrie fans were incensed and threatened to burn the wooden stand down if he was sold. His last game for the club came on 5 December 1925 in a 2–1 defeat to Morton. In 129 games for Airdrie, he hit 100 goals.

=== Newcastle United ===
Newcastle United's desperation for their new centre-forward meant that they were willing to pay £6,500 (£342,000 today) to capture him. Gallacher signed on 8 December 1925. He made an immediate impact, scoring two goals on his debut four days after signing in the 3–3 home draw against Everton (Dixie Dean hit an Everton hat trick) and scoring 15 goals in his first nine games. He ended the season with 23 league goals in 19 games, ending up as the club's top scorer despite signing halfway through the season.

From the very first match he played in England he was a marked man, hacked and elbowed and gouged by defenders acting on instructions to stop him scoring at all costs. One teammate described how Gallacher would sit in the dressing room, with pieces of flesh hanging from his legs and his socks and boots soaked in blood.

The following season, 1926–27, 23-year-old Gallacher was given the captaincy, and his powerful leadership qualities took Newcastle to the League Championship for the first time since 1909, although his criticism of some of the less talented players in the team did not go unnoticed. Sunderland were still in contention until they were beaten 1–0 at St James' Park on 19 March before a then record crowd of 67,211. The goalscorer was Gallacher, still widely rated today as Newcastle's finest ever player. He scored 36 league goals in 38 appearances, still the highest number of league goals in one season by a Newcastle player.

Whilst at Newcastle United, he scored 143 league and cup goals in 174 appearances. His strike rate of over 82% is the most prolific in the club's history.

A chant reportedly once sung at St James' Park in relation to Hughie went as follows;

"Do ye ken hughie gallacher the wee scots lad,
The best centre forward Newcastle ever had,
If he doesn't score a goal then wu'll put him on the dole,
and wu'll send him back to Scotland where he came from."

=== Chelsea ===
Gallacher joined David Calderhead's Chelsea as part of a £25,000 spending spree which also saw the club sign his fellow Scottish forwards Alex Jackson and Alec Cheyne; such was his popularity at Newcastle, when Chelsea visited St James' Park, the home of Newcastle United, that season the attendance was a record 68,386 with several thousand more locked out. Gallacher scored 81 goals in 144 games and was Chelsea's top scorer in each of his four seasons in west London. The team sometimes clicked, such as in a 6–2 win over Manchester United and a 5–0 win over Sunderland but trophies remained elusive.

The FA Cup was to be the closest the club came to silverware. In 1932, the team secured impressive wins over Liverpool and Sheffield Wednesday, and were drawn against Newcastle United in the semi-finals. Tommy Lang inspired Newcastle to a 2–0 lead, before Gallacher pulled one back for Chelsea. The Blues laid siege to the United goal in the second half, but were unable to make a breakthrough and the Geordies went on to lift the trophy.

Gallacher's time there was also marred by suspensions for indiscipline – including a two-month ban for swearing at a referee – and off-pitch controversies. In 1934 he ended up in the bankruptcy court due to a prolonged and acrimonious divorce.

=== Later career ===
Gallacher was transferred to Derby County in November 1934 for £2,750. He was taken under the wing of fellow Scotsmen Dally Duncan and an old Newcastle United friend, Jimmy Boyd, and was said to have been as good as gold during his Baseball Ground days. His 38 goals in 51 league games helped Derby finish second in the league to Sunderland in 1935–36, a finish the club have surpassed only twice (both times in the 1970s under the influence of Brian Clough and Dave Mackay). Gallacher hit 40 goals in his 55 games for Derby. Later in 1941, when the club were investigated by the F.A. over suspected financial irregularities, one of the accusations was that manager George Jobey had paid Gallacher illegal signing-on fees. The player refused to admit it, but Jobey, manager of the Rams since 1925, received a ten-year suspension for his part in the scandal.

The following season, 1936, he moved to Notts County for £2,000. His impressive 32 goals in 45 games helped County to a second-place finish in England's third division. In January 1938 he moved to Grimsby Town for £1,000, hitting three goals in his 12 games.

Later in 1938, Gateshead, a modest team languishing in the bottom division, paid £500 for him. "It's grand to be back on Tyneside," said an emotional Gallacher, when he climbed off the train. "My heart has been here ever since I left United eight years ago. I intend to spend the rest of my life with my adopted folk in Gateshead." Crowds at the Gateshead ground soared to 20,000 a week. He hit 18 league goals for the club, which included a five-goal haul against Rotherham United. Whilst at Gateshead, he recorded double figures for English league goals for the 14th successive season. He retired from football with the outbreak of World War II.

== International career ==
Gallacher represented Scotland 20 times, hitting 24 goals. Only two players, Denis Law and Kenny Dalglish with 30 each, have scored more goals for the full Scotland team than Gallacher, who averaged 1.2 goals per game from his 20 caps. John McGinn equalled Gallacher’s 24 international goals on November 13th, 2026, when he scored twice against Macedonia in the UEFA Nations League, in his 94th appearance. Gallacher won his first cap on 1 March 1924 in a 2–0 victory against Ireland. Scotland won all six games when Gallacher and Alex James were both selected to play; this included the 1928 'Wembley Wizards' 5–1 defeat of England when James netted twice.

In November 1925 Gallacher hit five goals in the Scottish League's 7–3 victory over the Irish League in Belfast. By coincidence in February 1929 he scored a record five times for Scotland in the same city and with the same final scoreline during the 1928–29 British Home Championship (having also scored three against Wales four months earlier in the same competition.)

When the Scottish FA undertook a tour Canada & America in 1935, Gallacher scored ten times in six matches for an unofficial Scotland XI against club & representative sides.

== Retirement and death ==
Gallacher continued to live in Gateshead, trying a number of careers, one of them being a sports journalist, a role that led to him being banned from St James' Park for his outspoken remarks about Newcastle United. However, he continued to be a popular character on Tyneside. He turned out in charity matches even at the age of 52. With no savings from his footballing days, he took numerous unremarkable jobs, often menial, to earn a living to support his family. His second wife died in December 1950 from heart disease.

One evening in May 1957 Gallacher's son, Hughie Jr. (by his father's second marriage), said in a press interview, "Dad had been drinking that night when the trouble started. Up until then he had never laid a finger on Mat. But on this particular night Mat had ignored Dad and Dad had reacted. He had picked up an ashtray and threw it across the room, maybe in temper, but I'm sure only to frighten the lad. But it hit Mat on the side of the head and drew blood. Basically this had been a domestic situation that had got out of hand and it should have been left at that, but a neighbour who had come on the scene asked if she should get the police and, without thinking, I said yes. That was a stupid thing for me to do. If I'd only given myself a minute to think I wouldn't have said it. Yes, I was upset, but I obviously wasn't prepared for the consequences."

For weeks after the alleged assault, Gallacher began wandering the streets. Many people spoke to him including Newcastle players and staff offering support and assuring him that no one would believe the press and their scandalous statements. Many offered to speak on his behalf.

Denied access to his son and with the court appearance looming, Gallacher began to get increasingly irrational. A local reporter friend said he looked like 'a traumatised man walking in a glassy-eyed dream'. Gallacher said to a friend, "It's no good fighting this thing now. They have got me on this one. My life is finished. It's no use fighting when you know you can't win." He was summoned to Gateshead Magistrates Court for Wednesday 12 June 1957.

On 11 June, he posted a short message to the Gateshead Coroner expressing his regrets at what he had caused, adding that 'if he had lived to be 100 he would never be able to forgive himself for having hurt Mattie'. He then wandered aimlessly through the streets ignoring the greetings of several people.

On the day of his death, two young trainspotters watched him for half an hour pacing backwards and forwards on a footbridge over the London-Edinburgh railway line at Low Fell, Gateshead. He was openly weeping, talking to himself and occasionally pounding the bridge rail with his fists. He stepped down from the bridge and killed himself by walking in front of an oncoming express train. When the effects of his father's suicide had subsided Mattie returned home to stay with his elder brother Hughie, before moving to South Africa in 1965.

== Legacy ==
On 13 December 2021, a brick memorial tribute was unveiled to Gallacher at Derby County's Pride Park Stadium. On 22 February 2023, his grandson Andy Gallacher was present to unveil a further memorial plaque at Gateshead Redheugh F.C.; both tributes were organised by author and historian Kal Singh Dhindsa. Owing to his importance in the history of Newcastle United, it was suggested on Tyneside that a similar memorial could be erected at St James' Park.

== Career statistics ==
=== Club statistics ===
Club	Season	League		National Cup		Other		Total	
Club	Season	Apps	Goals	Apps	Goals	Apps	Goals	Apps	Goals
Queen of the South	1920–21	–		1 (Note: One appearance (1–3 defeat to Nithsdale Wanderers in 2nd round).)	1	1 (Note: One appearances & one goal in the Southern Counties Charity Cup.)	1	2	2
Airdrieonians	1921–22	111	91	18	9	1 (Note: One appearance & one goal in the Lanarkshire Express Cup.)	1	139	113
Airdrieonians	1922–23	111	91	18	9	3 (Note: Two appearances in the Lanarkshire Cup. One appearances & two goals in the Lanarkshire Express Cup.)	2	139	113
Airdrieonians	1923–24	111	91	18	9	1 (Note: One appearance & one goal in the Lanarkshire Cup.)	1	139	113
Airdrieonians	1924–25	111	91	18	9	3 (Note: Three appearances & six goals in the Lanarkshire Cup.)	6	139	113
Airdrieonians	1925–26	111	91	18	9	2 (Note: Two appearances & three goals in the Lanarkshire Cup.)	3	139	113
Total		111	91	18	9	10	13	139	113
Newcastle United	1925–26	19	23	3	2	–		22	25
Newcastle United	1926–27	38	36	3	3	–		41	39
Newcastle United	1927–28	32	21	1	0	–		33	21
Newcastle United	1928–29	33	24	1	0	–		34	24
Newcastle United	1929–30	38	29	6	5	–		44	34
Total		160	133	14	10	–		174	143
Chelsea	1930–31	30	14	1	0	–		31	14
Chelsea	1931–32	36	24	5	6	–		41	30
Chelsea	1932–33	36	19	1	0	–		37	19
Chelsea	1933–34	23	13	5	3	–		28	16
Chelsea	1934–35	7	2	–		–		7	2
Total		132	72	12	9	–		144	81
Derby County	1934–35	51	23	3	1	–		55	24
Derby County	1935–36	51	15	1	1	–		55	16
Total		51	38	4	2	–		55	40
Notts County	1936–37	45	25	1 (Note: One appearance (0–2 defeat to Gateshead in 1st round).)	0	1 (Note: One appearance in Third Division South Cup.)	0	47	25
Notts County	1937–38	45	7	–		–		47	7
Total		45	32	1	0	1	0	47	32
Grimsby Town	1937–38	12	3	–		–		12	3
Gateshead	1938–39	34	18	–		–		34	18
Career Total		545	387	50	31	12	14	607	432

=== International appearances ===
International statistics
National team	Year	Apps	Goals
Scotland	1924	1	0
Scotland	1925	4	5
Scotland	1926	3	4
Scotland	1927	3	1
Scotland	1928	2	3
Scotland	1929	3	7
Scotland	1930	2	4
Scotland	1931	—	
Scotland	1932	—	
Scotland	1933	—	
Scotland	1934	1	0
Scotland	1935	1	0
Total		20	24

=== International goals ===
#	Date	Venue	Opponent	Score	Result	Competition
1	14 February 1925	Tynecastle Park, Edinburgh	Wales	2–0	3–1	BHC
2	14 February 1925	Tynecastle Park, Edinburgh	Wales	3–1	3–1	BHC
3	28 February 1925	Windsor Park, Belfast	Ireland	2–0	3–0	BHC
4	4 April 1925	Hampden Park, Glasgow	England	1–0	2–0	BHC
5	4 April 1925	Hampden Park, Glasgow	England	2–0	2–0	BHC
6	27 February 1926	Ibrox Park, Glasgow	Ireland	1–0	4–0	BHC
7	27 February 1926	Ibrox Park, Glasgow	Ireland	3–0	4–0	BHC
8	27 February 1926	Ibrox Park, Glasgow	Ireland	4–0	4–0	BHC
9	30 October 1926	Ibrox Park, Glasgow	Wales	1–0	3–0	BHC
10	29 October 1927	The Racecourse, Wrexham	Wales	1–0	2–2	BHC
11	27 October 1928	Ibrox Park, Glasgow	Wales	1–1	4–2	BHC
12	27 October 1928	Ibrox Park, Glasgow	Wales	2–1	4–2	BHC
13	27 October 1928	Ibrox Park, Glasgow	Wales	3–1	4–2	BHC
14	23 February 1929	Windsor Park, Belfast	Ireland	1–0	7–3	BHC
15	23 February 1929	Windsor Park, Belfast	Ireland	2–0	7–3	BHC
16	23 February 1929	Windsor Park, Belfast	Ireland	3–0	7–3	BHC
17	23 February 1929	Windsor Park, Belfast	Ireland	5–2	7–3	BHC
18	23 February 1929	Windsor Park, Belfast	Ireland	6–3	7–3	BHC
19	26 October 1929	Ninian Park, Cardiff	Wales	1–0	4–2	BHC
20	26 October 1929	Ninian Park, Cardiff	Wales	1–0	2–0	BHC
21	22 February 1930	Celtic Park, Glasgow	Ireland	1–0	3–1	BHC
22	22 February 1930	Celtic Park, Glasgow	Ireland	2–1	3–1	BHC
23	18 May 1930	Stade Olympique, Paris	France	1–0	2–0	Friendly
24	18 May 1930	Stade Olympique, Paris	France	2–0	2–0	Friendly

=== Inter-league appearances ===
Inter-league statistics
National team	Year	Apps	Goals
Scottish Football; League XI	1925	2	6
Total		6	6

=== Inter-league goals ===
Inter-league goals by date, venue, cap, opponent, score and result
No.	Date	Venue	Cap	Opponent	Score	Result
1	14 March 1925	Goodison Park, Liverpool	1	(England) The Football League XI	3–2	3–4
2	11 November 1925	Solitude, Belfast	2	(Northern Ireland) Irish League XI	2–0	7–3
3	11 November 1925	Solitude, Belfast	2	(Northern Ireland) Irish League XI	3–0	7–3
4	11 November 1925	Solitude, Belfast	2	(Northern Ireland) Irish League XI	4–1	7–3
5	11 November 1925	Solitude, Belfast	2	(Northern Ireland) Irish League XI	5–1	7–3
6	11 November 1925	Solitude, Belfast	2	(Northern Ireland) Irish League XI	6–1	7–3

=== Unofficial international appearances ===
Unofficial appearances statistics
National team	Year	Apps	Goals
Scotland XI (Note: Sometimes referred to as a Scottish FA XI or SFA XI.)	1935	6	10
Total		6	10

=== Unofficial international goals ===
Unofficial international goals by date, venue, opponent, score and result
No.	Date	Venue	Opponent	Score	Result
1	18 May 1935	Sesquicentennial Stadium, Philadelphia	(United States) Philadelphia German-American	3–0	3–0
2	22 May 1935	Soldiers Field, Toronto	(Canada) Toronto All-Stars	3–1	3–1
3	29 May 1935	Calgary	(United States) Alberta All-Stars	1–0	9–1 (Note: Some reports show Gallacher with five goals (instead Douglas Duncan's single goal). The Dundee Courier on 31 May 1935.)
4	29 May 1935	Calgary	(United States) Alberta All-Stars	3–0	9–1
5	29 May 1935	Calgary	(United States) Alberta All-Stars	7–1	9–1
6	29 May 1935	Calgary	(United States) Alberta All-Stars	8–1	9–1
7	1 June 1935	Con Jones Park, Vancouver	(Canada) Vancouver All-Stars	1–0	1–0
8	5 June 1935	Winnipeg	(United States) Manitoba All-Stars	5–2	7–2
9	5 June 1935	Winnipeg	(United States) Manitoba All-Stars	6–2	7–2
10	9 June 1935	Newark Stadium, Newark	(United States) American Soccer League	n/a (Note: Sequence of goals unknown.)	1–4

=== Career hat-tricks ===
Career hat-tricks by team for, date, opponent and result
For	Date	Opponent	Result	Comp
Scottish League XI	11 November 1925	(Northern Ireland) Irish League XI (A)	7–3 (Note: Scored five goals in match.)	Friendly
Scotland	27 February 1926	Ireland (H)	4–0	BHC
Scotland	27 October 1928	Wales (H)	4–2	BHC
Scotland	23 February 1929	Ireland (A)	7–3	BHC
Queen of the South	29 January 1921	St Cuthbert Wanderers	7–0 (Note: Scored four goals in match.)	Friendly
Queen of the South	1921	Dumbarton 'A'	5–2	Friendly
Queen of the South	1921	Glasgow Railway Select		Friendly
Queen of the South	1921	Queen's Park Hampden XI		Friendly
Newcastle United	10 November 1928	Manchester City (A)	4–2	FLD1
Newcastle United	9 February 1929	Manchester United (H)	5–0	FLD1
Newcastle United	31 August 1929	Manchester United (H)	4–1	FLD1
Newcastle United	23 November 1929	Portsmouth (H)	4–1	FLD1
Newcastle United	15 February 1930	Brighton (H)	3–0	FA Cup
Chelsea	21 August 1930	Blues v Reds (H) (Note: Public trial match for Chelsea - Blues (featuring Gallacher) v Reds.)	8–1	Trial
Chelsea	21 March 1932	Leipzig XI (A)	7–3 (Note: Scored six goals in match.)	Friendly
Chelsea	14 April 1932	Newcastle United (H)	4–1	FLD1
Chelsea	3 March 1933	Manchester City (A)	4–1	FLD1
Derby County	15 December 1934	Blackburn Rovers (A)	5–2	FLD1
Derby County	23 February 1935	Grimsby Town (A)	3–1	FLD1
Notts County	17 October 1936	Northampton Town (H)	3–2	FLD3S
Notts County	27 February 1937	Bristol Rovers (H)	4–3	FLD3S
Gateshead	17 September 1938	Rotherham United (H)	7–2	FLD3N

== Honours ==
Queen of the South

- Southern Counties Cup: 1920–21

Airdrieonians

- Scottish Cup: 1923–24
- Scottish 2nd XI Cup: 1921–22, 1922–23

Newcastle United

- Football League First Division: 1926–27

Scotland national team

- British Home Championship: 1924–25, 1925–26, 1926–27, 1928–29, 1934–35

Individual

- Scottish Football Hall of Fame: 2004
- English Football Hall of Fame: 2014
- Newcastle United Hall of Fame:
- Airdrieonians Hall of Fame: 2002
- Airdrieonians Greatest XI: 1878–2016

== See also ==
- List of English football first tier top scorers
- List of footballers in England by number of league goals (200+)
- List of Scotland national football team hat-tricks
- List of men's footballers with 500 or more goals

== Sources ==
- Paul Joannou, "The Black and White Alphabet", 1996, Polar Print Group Ltd, ISBN 1 899538 03 8
- Paul Joannou, "United, The First 100 Years", 1991, Polar Print Group Ltd, ISBN 1 899538 10 0
