= Clerwood Amateurs F.C. =

- Full name: Clerwood Amateurs Football Club
- Nickname(s): the Amateurs
- Founded: 1924
- Dissolved: 1934
- Ground: Clerwood Park
- Secretary: A. M'Leish
Home colours

Clerwood Amateurs F.C. was an association football club from Edinburgh, Scotland.

== History ==
The club was originally a juvenile XI attached to Corstophine Swifts, and separated as Clerwood Amateurs in 1924, when it joined the East of Scotland Football Association and the Lothian Amateur League. The club applied to join the Scottish Football Association in 1925, but the Scottish FA refused the application, on the basis that the club's changing facilities were inadequate.

The club's first achievement of note was reaching the East of Scotland Qualifying Cup final in 1924–25, which it lost to Vale of Leithen. This however entitled the club to play in the City Cup, and a revenge win over the Vale put the Amateurs into the final; it lost 3–1 to St Bernards in front of 1,000 at the latter's Gymnasium Ground.

It was a member of the East of Scotland Football League from 1928–29 to 1932–33, helped by taking over the Corstorphine Amateurs club before the 1929–30 season. Its best seasons in the competition was its first and last, both times finishing 4th, the first time out of 15 clubs, the second out of 11. Boosted by the Corstorphine players, the club reached the final of both the East of Scotland Qualifying Cup and the final of the City Cup in 1929–30, both times losing to Murrayfield Amateurs. Clerwood protested against the City Cup result, on the basis that Murrayfield's Anderson was Cup-tied, having played for Clerwood in the semi-final; Murrayfield claimed that, as the final of the competition had been held over to the start of the 1930–31 season, the Cup-tied rule did not apply - the East of Scotland FA dodged the question by declaring the complaint had not been officially lodged. Murrayfield had been a thorn in Clerwood's side in a third competition, emerging victorious from the Scottish Amateur Cup semi-final replay between the sides that season; that ended Clerwood's best run in the competition.

Clerwood also reached the final of the King Cup for the first time in 1932–33, but lost to Berwick Rangers. For the 1933–34 season it moved to the Edinburgh and District League and again finished 4th. The season had a bittersweet ending. The Amateurs gained their greatest honour by winning the King Cup, thanks to a 1–0 win over Penicuik Athletic; the only goal of the game an own goal from full-back Selkirk, who hooked a clearance back to Ramage in goal, without noticing that Ramage had come out of goal to collect the ball. However the club was forced to disband before the next season started; the club's benefactor, flour mill owner Thomas Tod, died in May, and his widow did not want to continue backing the club. The name was briefly revived after the Second World War for a schoolboy side.

== Colours ==
The club wore maroon shirts and white shorts.

== Ground ==
The club's ground was Clerwood Park, in the grounds of Clerwood House.
