= Bobby Aird =

Scottish footballer

Bobby Aird was a Scottish footballer, born in 1953, who played as midfielder.

He moved from Fairholm Youth Club to Hamilton Academical on 10 April 1971 (however, other sources say he made his debut for the Accies against Raith Rovers on 26 December the previous year). He made two appearances for the Accies - one start and one off the bench.

On 15 May 1982, Aird won the Scottish Amateur Cup with Avon Villa, beating Knockentiber 1–0 at Hampden. After that he founded Avonbridge AFC in Hamilton.
