= Portland Park =

Portland Park may refer to:

- Portland Park, Ashington, a defunct football ground in Ashington, England
- Portland Park, Galston, a defunct football ground in Galston, Scotland
- Portland Park, Troon, a football ground in Troon, Scotland; home of Troon F.C.
