= 1920–21 in Scottish football =

Football in Scotland
- Season: 1920–21

1920–21 in Scottish football

Division One champions
- Rangers

Scottish Cup winners
- Partick Thistle

Junior Cup winners
- Kirkintilloch Rob Roy

Scotland national team
- 1921 BHC

The 1920–21 season was the 48th season of competitive football in Scotland and the 31st season of the Scottish Football League.

== Scottish Football League ==
Pos	Team	Pld	W	D	L	GF	GA	GD	Pts
1	Rangers (C)	42	35	6	1	91	24	+67	76
2	Celtic	42	30	6	6	89	31	+58	66
3	Heart of Midlothian	42	20	10	12	74	49	+25	50
4	Dundee	42	19	11	12	54	48	+6	49
5	Motherwell	42	19	10	13	75	51	+24	48
6	Partick Thistle	42	17	12	13	53	39	+14	46
7	Clyde	42	21	3	18	63	62	+1	45
8	Third Lanark	42	19	6	17	74	61	+13	44
9	Morton	42	15	14	13	66	58	+8	44
10	Airdrieonians	42	17	9	16	71	64	+7	43
11	Kilmarnock	42	17	8	17	62	68	−6	42
12	Aberdeen	42	14	14	14	53	54	−1	42
13	Hibernian	42	16	9	17	58	57	+1	41
14	Hamilton Academical	42	14	12	16	44	57	−13	40
15	Ayr United	42	14	12	16	62	69	−7	40
16	Raith Rovers	42	16	5	21	54	58	−4	37
17	Falkirk	42	11	12	19	54	72	−18	34
18	Albion Rovers	42	11	12	19	57	68	−11	34
19	Queen's Park	42	11	11	20	45	80	−35	33
20	Clydebank	42	7	14	21	47	72	−25	28
21	Dumbarton	42	10	4	28	41	89	−48	24
22	St Mirren	42	7	4	31	43	92	−49	18

(C) Champions

Champions: Rangers

== Other honours ==
=== National ===
Competition	Winner	Score	Runner-up
Scottish Cup	Partick Thistle	1 – 0	Rangers
Scottish Qualifying Cup	East Fife	3 – 1	Bo'ness
Scottish Junior Cup	Kirkintilloch Rob Roy	1 – 0	Ashfield
Scottish Amateur Cup	Edinburgh Civil Service	2 – 0	Moorpark Amateurs

=== County ===
Competition	Winner	Score	Runner-up
Aberdeenshire Cup	Aberdeen University	3 – 1 (Note: Replay needed.)	Peterhead
Ayrshire Cup	Kilmarnock		
Dumbartonshire Cup	Vale of Leven	2 – 0	Clydebank
East of Scotland Shield	Hibernian	1 – 0	Hearts
Fife Cup	Raith Rovers	3 – 2	Dunfermline Athletic
Forfarshire Cup	Arbroath	3 – 0	Dundee
Glasgow Cup	Celtic	1 – 0	Clyde
Lanarkshire Cup	Albion Rovers	2 – 1	Hamilton
Linlithgowshire Cup	Bo'ness	2 – 0	Bathgate
North of Scotland Cup	Clachnacuddin v Inverness Thistle		
Perthshire Cup	St Johnstone	5 – 0	Blairgowrie Amateurs
Southern Counties Cup	Queen of the South	4 – 0	Douglas Wanderers
Stirlingshire Cup	Alloa Athletic	1 – 0	Falkirk

=== Non-league honours ===
Highland League

Top Three
Pos	Team	Pld	W	D	L	GF	GA	GD	Pts
1	Clachnacuddin	14	10	2	2	38	16	+22	22
2	Inverness Thistle	14	9	1	4	41	22	+19	19
3	Inverness Caledonian	14	7	3	4	28	18	+10	17

Source: SFHA

== Scotland national team ==
Date	Venue	Opponents	Score	Competition	Scotland scorer(s)
12 February 1921	Pittodrie Park, Aberdeen (H)	Wales	2–1	BHC	Andrew Wilson (2)
26 February 1921	Windsor Park, Belfast (A)	Ireland	2–0	BHC	Andrew Wilson (pen.), Joseph Cassidy
9 April 1921	Hampden Park, Glasgow (H)	England	3–0	BHC	Andrew Wilson, Alan Morton, Andy Cunningham

Scotland were winners of the 1921 British Home Championship.

Key:

- (H) = Home match
- (A) = Away match
- BHC = British Home Championship

== Other national teams ==
=== Scottish League XI ===
Date	Venue	Opponents	Score (Note: Scottish League XI's score is shown first.)	Scotland scorer(s)
25 January 1921	Ibrox, Glasgow (H)	(Northern Ireland) Irish League XI	3–0	
12 March 1921	Highbury, London (A)	(England) Football League XI	0–1	

== See also ==
- 1920–21 Aberdeen F.C. season
