= Jackie Gallacher =

Scottish footballer (1924–1995)

John "Jackie" Gallacher (17 May 1924 – 26 August 1995) was a Scottish footballer. In a career affected by injury he played for Celtic, Dunfermline Athletic, Falkirk and Kettering Town. He was the son of Scottish international Hughie Gallacher.

== Background ==
Hughie Gallacher met his first wife, Annie McIlvanney, at the coalpit he worked at in Hattonrig. Gallacher was from a Protestant background. McIlvanney coming from a Catholic background caused some family strains for a while. The couple married in July 1920 when Gallacher was 17 years old. They had a son, Hughie, who died before his first birthday and had a daughter Catherine (Cathy). Hughie and Annie separated in 1923. Jackie, born in 1924, grew up in Scotland when his father played most of his career in the English Football League.

== Career ==
=== Celtic ===
Jackie Gallacher joined Celtic on 10 July 1943 from Armadale Thistle at the age of 19. He made his Celtic first team debut in the wartime Scottish Southern League on 4 September 1943. He scored his team's only goal in a 4–1 home defeat by Dumbarton. He played 22 games in that competition that season scoring 19 goals. He scored 12 goals in six Scottish Southern League Cup group games before his team lost 4–2 to Rangers in the semi-final. He formed a productive partnership with inside-forward, Gerry McAloon, who was there that season. However Gallacher was not the same player when McAloon was often away with work leading to Gallacher at one point being dropped and requesting a transfer. Gallacher was understudy to Ephraim 'Jock' Dodds in the 1944 wartime Scotland v England international.

In the 1944–45 season Gallacher played in 21 games in the same wartime league competition. This time he scored 18 goals.

In 1945–46 he formed an effective partnership with another inside-forward, this time Tommy Kiernan. Gallacher played 24 games in the last edition of the Scottish Southern League finding the net 18 times. In the 1946 Victory Cup at the end of that season he scored three in an 8–2 win at St Johnstone and two in a 3–0 home win over his father's ex-club, Queen of the South. Gallacher was again eliminated in the semis by Rangers this time 2–0 in a replay in June 1946. However after some tough challenges by his opponents he was stretchered from the field subsequently spending all of the next season without first team football.

In 1947–48 he returned to the first team. In four Scottish League Cup group games he scored four goals including one in a 2–0 home win v Rangers. He then played in two league games in September that his club lost without scoring. He didn't feature in the first team again that season. He returned to the first team in late August 1948. In 29 games (including three in the winning Glasgow Cup run), he scored 21 goals. That included seven goals in six League Cup group games that included one goal in the 3–1 home win over Rangers. He scored all five of his team's combined goals losing 4–2 at Hibernian and 6–3 at home to Clyde. He scored another hat-trick that season in the 4–4 home league draw against Falkirk.

In 1948–49 his only Celtic appearance was his last for the club. He scored in a 5–1 League defeat on 17 December at Scot Symon's East Fife. He was 24 at the time. Gallacher had knee cartilage removed at the end of that season.

=== Loans to Dunfermline Athletic and Falkirk ===
In each of 1948–49 and 1949–50 Gallacher had loan spells at Dunfermline Athletic. He scored five goals from a combined 10 league games.

In 1950–51 he played 11 league games on loan for Falkirk. He scored twice in those games.

Gallacher left Celtic in August 1951 when he also left senior football. He joined non-league English side Kettering Town.

== Death ==
Gallacher died in Bellshill on 26 August 1995, at the age of 71.
