= Falkirk Amateurs F.C. =

Association football club in Falkirk, Scotland

Falkirk Amateurs
- Full name: Falkirk Amateurs Football Club
- Founded: 1897
- Dissolved: 1947
- Ground: Watling Park
Home colours

Falkirk Amateurs Football Club was a football club from Stirlingshire in Scotland that reached the first round of the Scottish Cup on a number of occasions in the 1930s.

== History ==
The club was founded in 1897 and played its first game at the end of the 1896–97 season, losing against Camelon's second eleven 4–2. Eight of the starting Amateurs would play for Falkirk F.C. in the future.

The club entered the Scottish Cup for the first time, in 1897, losing 7–0 at East Stirlingshire in the first qualifying round. The club continued to enter until World War 2. The club was also a regular entrant in the Stirlingshire Cup, but only ever won two ties in 32 years; it did however win the Consolation Cup (for clubs knocked out in the early rounds) in 1898–99, and retained the trophy the following year as none of the clubs entitled to enter the competition wanted to do so. The club also played in the Falkirk District League in the three years of its existence, finishing bottom every time.

The club's greatest honour was winning the Scottish Amateur Cup in 1922–23, beating Moorpark F.C. in the final at Forthbank, the ground of King's Park F.C.

In 1929–30, the club reached the first round of the national cup for the first time. It did so again the following season and again in 1932–33, the last of those after the club got to the final of the Scottish Qualifying Cup (South) for the only time, losing 4–2 against Beith F.C. at Ibrox Park in the final and at fellow amateurs Queen's Park F.C. in the first round of the competition proper, conceding three goals in seven first-half minutes before going out 4–0. The club's fourth and final appearance in the proper rounds was in 1938–39; on none of these occasions did the club win through to the second round.

The club struggled to re-start after the war, being unable to take part in the Stirlingshire Cup in 1945, and after an 11–1 defeat at Stirling Albion in the 1947–48 edition it does not seem to have continued.

== Colours ==
The club's colours were originally blue shirts and white shorts, but from 1903 the club played in all white, apart from wearing blue and white stripes in the early 1920s.

== Ground ==
The club originally played at Comely Park, off Burnhead Lane; the ground was also known as Tannery Park. The club occasionally played at Falkirk F.C.'s Brockville ground for important fixtures.

In 1926, the club was gifted a new ground at Summerford in Camelon, which it called Watling Park, after the Junior club Watling Juniors, which had used the ground before the war. The ground hosted a Scottish Cup tie in 1938 as home side Larbert Amateurs did not have a suitable ground.

== Honours ==
Scottish Amateur Cup

- Winners: 1922–23

Scottish Qualifying Cup (South)

- Runners-up: 1932–33

Stirlingshire Consolation Cup

- Winners: 1898–99
- Runners-up: 1897–98

== Notable players ==
- Clyde Skene
- James Callander, architect, amongst whose buildings was the grandstand at Brockville
