= Larbert Amateurs F.C. =

Association football club in Larbert, Scotland

Larbert Amateurs
- Full name: Larbert Amateurs Football Club
- Nickname: the Amateurs
- Founded: 1923
- Dissolved: 1945
- Ground: Victoria Park
- Hon. President: Mr P. Forbes Jones
- President: James Walker
Home colours

Larbert Amateurs Football Club was a football club from Larbert, in Stirlingshire, Scotland, which reached the second round of the Scottish Cup in 1937–38.

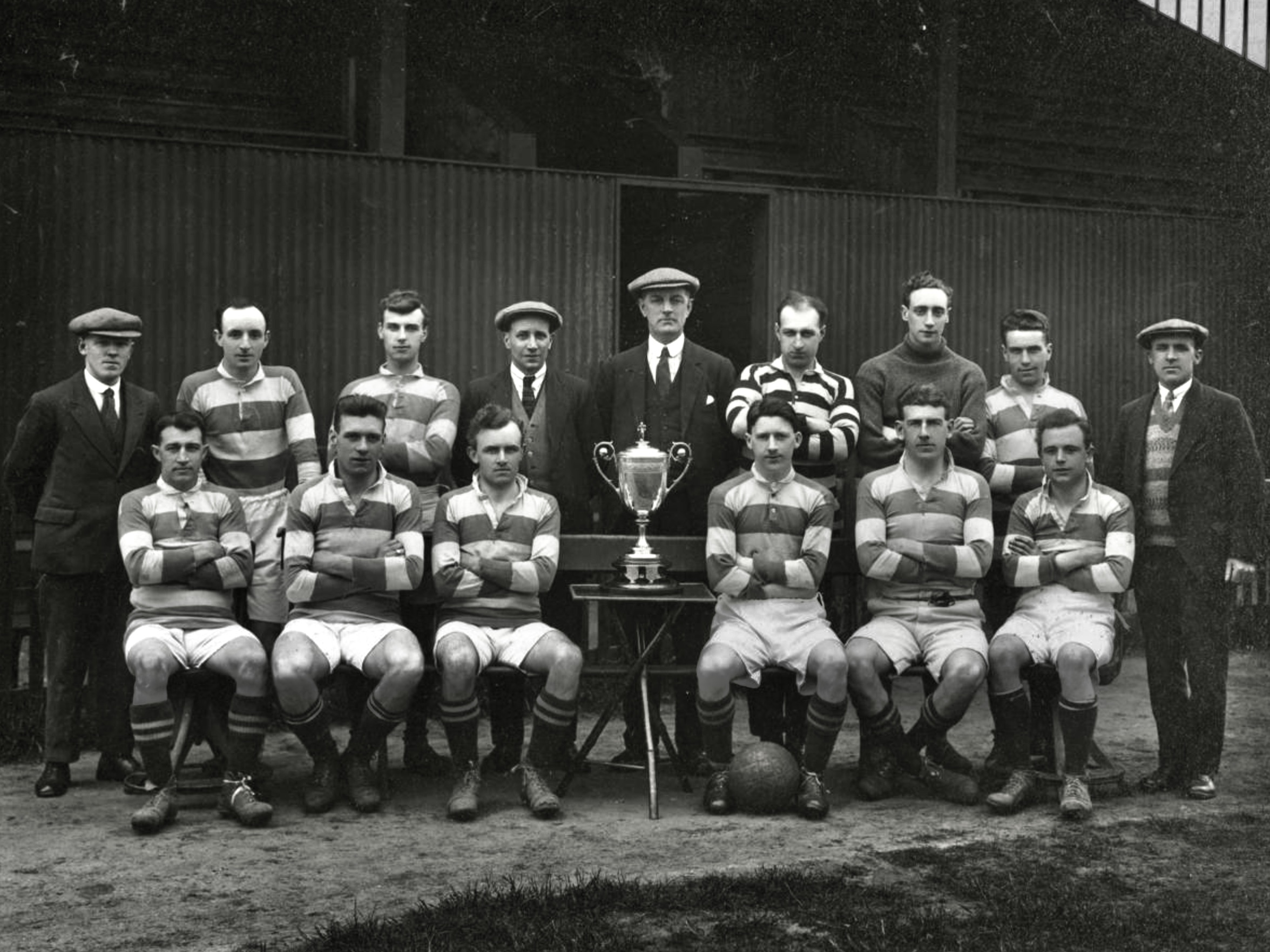
Larbert Amateurs with the Stirlingshire Consolation Cup, 1926. Back row: J Armstrong, Tom Rennie; William Niven; William Campbell (committee); James Walker (President); D Reid (reserve); George Binnie; Peter Ure; Ben Finlayson (trainer). Front row: J S Reid; William Hastings; Robert Rennie; David Maitland; Stewart McLaughlan; Alex Reid

== History ==
Local amateur players formed sides under the name Larbert Amateurs occasionally either side of World War 1, but the formal Larbert Amateurs club was set up at the start of the 1923–24 season, at a meeting on 28 August 1923, the club joining the eastern division of the Scottish Amateur League.

=== Stirlingshire Cup ===
The club's only success in the amateur system was reaching Scottish Amateur Cup final in 1924–25, losing 1–0 to Coldstream, Tocher scoring the only goal after 20 minutes. From 1925–26 to 1939–40, the club entered the Stirlingshire Cup. The club played in 16 ties in the main competition and the Consolation Cup for clubs eliminated before the final, and lost 14 of them.

The only two ties it won were against Falkirk Amateurs in the Consolation in 1932–33 (a 4–1 win, helped by Jack of Falkirk being sent off just before half-time for arguing against a penalty award) and against King's Park in the Consolation in 1925–26. Because of a bye and the withdrawal of Alloa Athletic, the latter match was the competition final, meaning that the Amateurs' first win in the competition also brought the club its only trophy. The original match (at Brockville) ended in a 2–2 draw, and the Amateurs won the replay, at the same venue, 3–2, with two goals from Maitland in the first half, and Peter Ure scoring the winner a few minutes from time.

=== Scottish Cup ===
In 1931, following a satisfactory inspection of the playing field and its enclosure, the club joined the Scottish Football Association. This entitled the club to enter the Scottish Qualifying Cup, with a view to winning far enough through the competition to play in the Scottish Cup proper.

The club reached the quarter-finals of the Southern section twice, in 1936–37 and 1937–38, which meant the club was able to play in the Scottish Cup. In 1936–37, the club lost in the first round 3–1 at home to Solway Star, the visitors scoring 2 late goals as the Amateurs tired. The tie was played a week ahead of other ties as Celtic had been drawn at Stenhousemuir and the Amateurs wanted to avoid the fixture clash.

The following season, the club was drawn away at fellow amateur side Moorpark, and enjoyed an easy 5–2 win, R. S. Richardson scoring twice in the first half to set the side on its way; the only downside being that the crowd of 300 only generated gate receipts of £15. The second round draw gave the club a home tie with Morton, which caused the club to investigate switching the tie, on the basis that Victoria Park was too hemmed in and overlooked by housing to cope with a First Division side. The Scottish FA refused permission to change the venue entirely, but allowed the match to be hosted at Falkirk Amateurs' Watling Park, with Larbert being responsible for all costs as the nominal home team.

In the tie itself, the Amateurs, despite being only in the second division of the Amateur League, nearly pulled off a shock result, Wilson giving the side the lead after ten minutes, but the tie turning on the stroke of half-time, when Morton was given a penalty on the insistence of the linesman over Larbert claims for a free-kick (J. Reid being booked for his protesting); Morton ended up 3–2 winners thanks to a goal in the 74th minute. Unfortunately for the club, the extra expense of switching grounds proved to be unnecessary - the attendance for the tie was precisely 93, paying £4; the next lowest attendance in the round was 3,000 at Hamilton Academical. Even worse, the Scottish FA censured Larbert for not having a suitable ground, and gave the club two months to put it in order; the club launched a public appeal for the £50 required, but it only acted as a stay of execution, the club being struck off the roll of members in April 1939 for not having a suitable ground.

=== The end of the club ===
Despite rumours before the start of the 1939–40 season that the club was in trouble, with a number of key individuals having left their posts, there was enough of an influx of new members to make the club's future look "decidedly bright". However, World War 2 interrupted the season, and the club went into abeyance for the war years. By 1942 the club was in arrears with its subscription to the Stirlingshire County Football Association, and, although the club was still considered an association member at the end of the war, it never re-started operations.

== Colours ==
The club's original colours were black and blue. From 1933 - and probably from 1926 - they were red and white hoops, with black and white as a change kit. The kit worn by the club in its tie with Morton was white with a single red hoop and red knickers.

== Ground ==
The club originally shared Ochilview with Stenhousemuir. The Warriors' joining of the Scottish League in 1927 made such arrangements untenable, and the club sought a new ground. In 1928 it occupied a new pitch, which the club called Blackmyre Park, next to Ochilview, but the situation remained unsatisfactory.

The club secured a new home in 1930, on a pitch next to the Torwood Foundry, gifted to the club by the club's honorary president (and director at the Foundry) Peter Forbes Jones. The club called the ground Victoria Park, as the pitch lay alongside Victoria Road, and the club brought over the pavilion from Blackmyre Park. The pitch area survives as Stewartfield Park.

== Honours ==
Scottish Amateur Cup

- Runner-up: 1924–25

Stirlingshire Consolation Cup

- Winner: 1925–26
