= Galston F.C. =

Former association football club in Ayrshire, Scotland

Galston
- Full name: Galston Football Club
- Nicknames: the Riverside Lads, the Galstonians
- Founded: 1891
- Dissolved: 1940
- Ground: Portland Park, Galston
Home colours

Galston Football Club were a football club based in Galston, Ayrshire, Scotland. The club were members of the Scottish Football League Third Division and played at Portland Park.

== History ==
Formed in 1891 to play in the new Ayrshire Football League, they lasted in that competition for its four-year run before joining the Ayrshire Football Combination. After three years without regular competition the club joined the North Ayrshire League, later appearing in the Scottish Football Combination and Scottish Football Union.

They eventually joined the Western league, which was incorporated by the Scottish Football League as its new Third Division for the 1923–24 season. Galston lasted the division's three seasons, finishing 13th, 11th and 16th, although they resigned midway through the abandoned final season, unable to provide match guarantees. Indeed, Galston had been so keen to increase the income from their meagre gates that they were censured by the League for charging entrance fees below the minimum agreed league level, then in turn blamed for accelerating the collapse of the Third Division by being the first to pull out from it in February 1926.

They proved one of the division's survivors and found themselves playing in first the West of Scotland Amateur league before being invited to join the Scottish Football Alliance from 1932 onward – a league made up of Senior Reserve teams and non-league sides which they had been invited to join to generate more interest in a competition many Senior clubs were considering abandoning due to a lack of public interest.

However, in 1938, Hamilton Academical proposed they and Beith be expelled and the league restricted to First Division clubs reserve teams only. Despite an impassioned plea by letter from club president James Abbott to every Scottish League side – pointing out they had brought Beith and Galston in to prop up the league in the first place – only Ayr United, Clyde, Kilmarnock, Queen's Park and St Mirren voted to retain them and both sides were duly expelled.

The Alliance was then abandoned and a new Reserve League set up, whereupon moves were made in 1940 for a new Scottish Football Alliance to be set up, among which the invitees were Galston and Vale of Leven, another side that had been damaged by the collapse of the Third Division and who had not played competitively since 1929 over a lack of any Senior league in which to play. However, after only a month's worth of games the Second World War broke out and the league was put on indefinite hold. Without any Senior league to play in, and not interested in joining the Junior ranks, this marked the end of Galston FC.

== Kit ==
During their relatively brief history Galston wore a number of different kits. They can be summarised thus:

Years	Shirt	Shorts	Stockings
1891–1892	Red and black hooped	White	Black
1892–1895	Blue, white and red hooped	Blue	Blue
1895–1897	Light blue	Blue	Blue
1897–1904	Red and black hooped	Blue	Blue
1904–1906	Pale blue	White	Blue with pale blue trim
1906–1908	Blue	White	Blue with white trim
1908–1910	Red and black hooped	White	Black with red trim
1910–1913	Black and white striped	White	Black with white trim
1913–1916	Black and white striped	Black	Black with white trim
1919–1920	Black and white hooped	Black	Black with white trim
1923–1924	Red and black hooped	White	Black with red trim
1924–1927	Pale blue	White	Blue
1927–1930	Blue	White	Blue with white trim
1930–1931	Red	White	Red with white trim

== Full Scottish League record ==
Season	Position	Pl	W	D	L	F	A	Pts	Notes
1923–24	13th	30	11	3	16	53	70	25	
1924–25	11th	30	10	6	14	39	70	26	
1925–26	16th	15	4	4	7	38	46	12	

KEY: Pl=Matches played; W=Matches won; D=Matches drawn or tied; L=Matches lost; F=Goals scored (for); A=Goals conceded (against); Pts=Points (2 awarded for a win, 1 for a draw)

- Biggest win (Scottish Football League): 9–2 v Brechin City (away) 1923–24
- Biggest defeat (Scottish Football League): 8–0 v Queen of the South (away) 1924–25

== Scottish Cup record ==
During the course of their existence Galston qualified for the Scottish Cup eighteen times. They made the second round on seven occasions (1906–07, 1907–08, 1910–11, 1922–23, 1923–24, 1933–34 and 1935–36), going out in the first round eleven times (1894–95, 1899–1900, 1905–06, 1919–20, 1920–21, 1924–25, 1928–29, 1929–30, 1934–35, 1936–37, 1937–38).

== Football in the town ==
The town of Galston has been represented at amateur level since the early 1970s by Galston United who play in the upper echelons of the local amateur league; they play at the local secondary school (Loudoun Academy) and have no link to the original club.
