= Babcock & Wilcox F.C. =

Babcock & Wilcox
- Full name: Babcock & Wilcox Football Club
- Nickname(s): B & W, the Babbies
- Founded: 1908
- Dissolved: 2010?
- Ground: Moorcroft Park
1930s colours	post-World War 2 colours

Babcock & Wilcox Football Club was the works football team of the Babcock & Wilcox Limited company, based in Renfrew, Scotland.

== History ==
The club was founded in 1908, with the first opponents being St Mirren's "A" side, and became a member of the Scottish Football Association in 1912. As a senior member of the association, the club was entitled to enter the Scottish Cup, and did so until 1988. For many years the club also fielded two sides in the Scottish Amateur and Greater Glasgow leagues.

As a works side with a limited pool of players, the club usually failed to reach the competition proper, instead being knocked out in the qualifying rounds. The club's first appearance in the first round proper was in 1935-36, losing 6–0 to Dundee F.C.

=== 1938–39 Scottish Cup surprise ===
The club's best Cup season was in 1938–39. That season, the club had an experienced line-up, made up entirely of former professional players, thanks to the parent firm being able to offer better working wages than the semi-professional sides. including Tierney (former goalkeeper with Crystal Palace F.C., Frame (former Manchester United and Cowdenbeath F.C. player), M'Millan (former Third Lanark left-back), Bourhill (former Morton right-back), Pope (former Partick Thistle outside-right), Smith (former inside-left for Heart of Midlothian), Jimmy Leonard (former centre-forward for Hibernian and Cowdenbeath), and Kavanagh (former outside-left with Celtic F.C.). The club reached the final of the qualifying cup competition (losing to Inverness Clachnacuddin), and gained its only Scottish Cup win against a Scottish League side, beating King's Park in a first round replay. The original tie at Park's Forthbank ground, in front of a crowd of 1,630, ended 5-5; the "speed and the amazing accuracy of the to-grade passing of the entire Babcock front line that bewildered all the King's Park defenders" as the club came from 2–0 down after 15 minutes to lead 4–2 at half-time and only concede a final equalizer in the final ten minutes.

In the replay, in front of 1,267 spectators paying a gate of £61, Babcock & Wilcox was helped by an injury to King's Park goalkeeper Giannandrea; after dropping a cross which led to the winning goal by Leonard, he swapped out of goal with right-back Kennedy and played on the right-wing.

The club went out to Queen of the South in the second round, and were on top for half-an-hour, before the fitness of the top division club proved decisive.

The club's success in the competition led to some thought of the club joining the Scottish League, an appointed George M'Loughlin of Queen of the South to manage the side, and as a back-up approaching other clubs (such as Vale Ocoba to form a separate competition, but World War 2 ended any such hopes.

=== Post-war ===
The club's only other qualifying cup final was in the southern section in 1957–58, losing over two legs to Eyemouth United. After beating Forres Mechanics in the first round of the competition proper in 1958-59, the club lost in the second to fellow Renfrewshire side Morton.

The club's last appearance in the competition proper was in 1972–73, losing in the first round to Berwick Rangers in front of a crowd of 808.

The last tie the club played was a 6–0 defeat to Annan Athletic in the 1987-88 qualifying rounds. At the end of the season, the club lost access to its ground, and as a result lost its membership of the Association; with the loss of membership came the loss of entitlement to entering the Scottish Cup. The club changed its name to Moorcroft A.F.C. and continued briefly as an amateur side.

=== Renfrewshire Cup ===
As senior members of the Scottish FA, the club was entitled to participate in the Renfrewshire Cup, which was generally dominated by Scottish League clubs St Mirren and Greenock Morton. The club first entered in 1912, and won the competition for the only time in 1953–54, when Morton was the only other entrant.

== Ground ==
The club's ground was Moorcroft Park. The highest attendance at the ground was 2,000 for the Scottish Cup second round tie with Morton on 14 February 1959.

== Colours ==
The club's colours were black and white. Leading up to the Second World War, the arrangement was an all black kit, with a white band on the shirt. By the 1970s the club wore black and white 1" hooped jerseys with white shorts and socks.

== Honours ==
- Scottish Qualifying Cup
  - Runners-up 1938–39, 1958–59
- Renfrewshire Cup
  - Winners 1953–54
  - Runners-up 1952–52, 1952–53, 1956–57
- Scottish Amateur Cup
  - Runners-up 1947–48, 1952–53
- West of Scotland Amateur Cup
  - Winners 1952–53

== See also ==
Category:Babcock & Wilcox (soccer) players
