= Ayrshire Amateur Football Association =

- Founded: 1935
- Country: Scotland
- Confederation: UEFA
- Divisions: 4
- Number of clubs: 44
- Level on pyramid: N/A
- Promotion to: None
- Relegation to: None
- Domestic cup(s): Scottish Amateur Cup; West of Scotland Cup
- Current champions: Hurlford Thistle

The Ayrshire Amateur Football Association is a football (soccer) league competition, primarily for amateur clubs in the Ayrshire region of Scotland. The association was founded in 1935, making it one of the oldest in the country. The association is affiliated to the Scottish Amateur Football Association.

== Member Clubs ==
As of season 2018–19, the Ayrshire AFA had 44 member clubs, listed hereafter in their respective leagues :

=== Premier League ===
- Ardeer West Recreation
- Ardrossan CR
- Cumnock AFC
- Dirrans Ath
- Galston Utd
- Glenburn MW
- Hurlford AFC
- Hurlford Thistle
- Kilbride Thistle
- Shortlees AFC
- Stewarton Utd
- Tarbolton AFC

=== First Division ===
- Catrine AFC
- Craigie AFC
- Crosshill Thistle
- Crosshouse Waverley
- Dailly AFC
- Glenmuir Thistle
- Irvine Meadow AFC
- Mauchline Utd
- Mossblown Boswell
- New Farm Loch AFC
- Troon Dundonald
- West Kilbride

=== Division 2A ===
- Broomlands AFC
- Dalry AFC
- Darvel Victoria
- Dean Fenwick Thistle
- Drongan Utd
- Heathside AFC
- Kilmarnock AFC
- Kilmarnock Utd
- Symington Caledonian
- Winlinton Wolves AFC

=== Division 2B ===
- Auchinleck Boswell
- Beith AFC
- Bellfield AFC
- Bellsdale AFC
- Irvine Meadow
- Largs Thistle AFC
- Minishant AFC
- Ochiltree Comm FC
- Onthank AFC
- Whitletts Victoria AFC

== League Structure ==
The Ayrshire AFA is split into four single tiers - a Premier Division at the summit with three divisions below, each on a separate level. Each tier has two promotion/relegation positions between divisions.

The league setup:

Level	League(s)/Division(s)
1	Ayrshire Premier League; 12 clubs playing 22 games
2	Ayrshire First Division; 12 clubs playing 22 games
3	Ayrshire Division 2A; 10 clubs playing 18 games
4	Ayrshire Division 2B; 10 clubs playing 18 games
