= Greenock High School Former Pupils A.F.C. =

Association football club in Scotland

Greenock H.S.F.P.s
- Full name: Greenock High School Former Pupils A.F.C.
- Nickname(s): the High
- Founded: 1907
- Ground: Battery Park
- League: Central Scottish Amateur Football League
Home colours

'Greenock High School F.P.s A.F.C. is an old boy association football club from Greenock, Renfrewshire, Scotland.

== History ==
The club was formed in 1907 for former pupils of Greenock High School, and has long been a stalwart of the Scottish amateur game. Its first competitive football came in the former pupils' league in 1911–12 and it was a member of the Scottish Amateur Football League from before the First World War until 2009–10, when it moved to the Central Scottish Amateur Football League.

At amateur level, the club has had significant success, including winning the Scottish Amateur Cup in 1921–22 and 1948–49, and the Amateur League in 1926–27, 1927–28, 1936–37, and 2006–07.

In August 1930, the club joined the Scottish Football Association, and was therefore entitled to enter the Scottish Qualifying Cup in an attempt to play in the Scottish Cup proper. The club's first match in the competition was a win over Paisley Academical, and in the second round it only lost 1–0 against Royal Albert, when a win would have qualified the club for the Cup itself.

It won twice more in the competition - 4–3 against Vale Ocoba in 1931–32 and against Moorpark in 1934–35; in the latter year, after a second round bye, the club lost to Paisley Academical at the final qualifying stage. The club's scratching to Babcock & Wilcox in 1937–38 was its last action in the competition.

The High also took part in the Renfrewshire Cup from 1929–30 to 1933–34, although by this time there were only two professional clubs taking part; the club gained its finest result by holding Morton to a draw in 1930–31. Thanks to the paucity of competition, the High won the Renfrewshire Victoria Cup - a consolation cup - in 1930–31 by beating the Paisley Grammar School Former Pupils F.C. in a match stopped at 80 minutes due to bad light.

== Colours ==
The club's traditional outfit is all royal blue, although on occasions - for instance from 2014 to 2017 and in 2021–22 - it has adopted Morton's blue and white hoops.

== Ground ==
The club plays at Battery Park. As a senior club, it had to play home cup ties on a private ground, and used Garvel Park, the home of Port Glasgow Juniors, to do so.
