= Scottish Amateur Cup =

- Organiser(s): Scottish Amateur Football Association
- Founded: 1909; 117 years ago
- Region: Scotland
- Current champions: Steins Thistle FC
- Most championships: Queen's Park (12 titles)

The Scottish Amateur Cup is a nationwide knockout tournament supported and organised by the Scottish Amateur Football Association. The Scottish Amateur Cup is contested by hundreds of football clubs every year. The first and second rounds are regionalised.

Since 2015, the winners of the Amateur Cup are invited to compete in the following season's senior Scottish Cup.

In October 2023, AC Mill Inn Academy beat St Machar Thistle 51-0, in a match that grabbed national attention. The result is believed to be the biggest winning margin in Scottish history.

== List of Winners ==
This list is incomplete; you can help by adding missing items with reliable sources.

Season	Winners	Score	Runners-up	Final Venue	Winners' League	Scottish Cup progression
1909–10	John Neilson Institute Former Pupils	6–1	Paisley Academical	Love Street		
1910–11	Edinburgh Civil Service	1–0	Queen's Park Strollers	Forthbank	Scottish	
1911–12	Queen's Park Strollers	2–0	Leith Amateurs	Hampden Park	Scottish	
1912–13	Leith Amateurs	1–0	Ardrossan Academy Former Pupils	Hampden Park	Scottish	
1913–14	Cameronians	2–0	Albert Road School	Hampden Park		
1914–19	Suspended due to World War I					
1919–20	Queen's Park Victoria XI	3–1	Civil Service Strollers	Cathkin Park	Scottish	
1920–21	Edinburgh Civil Service	2–0	Moorpark Amateurs	Hampden Park	Scottish	
1921–22	Greenock High School Former Pupils	1–1	Coldstream	Cappielow Park	Scottish	
1921–22	Greenock High School Former Pupils	3–1	Coldstream	Union Park	Scottish	
1922–23	Falkirk Amateurs	2–0	Moorpark Amateurs	Forthbank		
1923–24	Moorpark Amateurs	1–0	Greenock High School Former Pupils	Cappielow Park	Scottish	
1924–25	Coldstream	2–0	Larbert Amateurs	Tynecastle Park		
1925–26	Murrayfield Amateurs	7–0	Leith Amateurs	Tynecastle Park		
1926–27	Glasgow University	2–1	Gourock High School Former Pupils	Cappielow Park		
1927–28	Queen's Park Victoria XI	6–1	Anchor Line	Hampden Park	Scottish	
1928–29	Murrayfield Amateurs	2–1	Queen's Park Victoria XI	Hampden Park		
1929–30	Murrayfield Amateurs	2–2	Gourock High School Former Pupils	Cappielow Park		
1929–30	Murrayfield Amateurs	2–0	Gourock High School Former Pupils	Hampden Park		
1930–31	Murrayfield Amateurs	6–1	Clydebank Former Pupils	Hampden Park		
1931–32	Glasgow Corporation Transport	2–1	Queen's Park Victoria XI	Hampden Park	Scottish	
1932–33	Queen's Park Victoria XI	3–2	Mavor's XI	Helenvale Park	Scottish	
1933–34	Queen's Park Victoria XI	4–1	East Kilbride	Hampden Park	Scottish	
1934–35	Camphill Secondary School Former Pupils	4–2	Howwood	Love Street		
1935–36	Queen's Park Victoria XI	2–0	Greenock High School Former Pupils	Cappielow Park	Scottish	
1936–37	Gogarburn Amateurs	3–0	Edinburgh University	Tynecastle Park		
1937–38	Coats Amateurs	2–1	Gogarburn Amateurs	Love Street		
1938–39	Murrayfield Amateurs	2–0	Viewfield Rovers	Tynecastle Park		
1939–45	Suspended due to World War II					
1945–46	Craigton Athletic	1–1	Newton Swifts			
1945–46	Craigton Athletic	2–0	Newton Swifts	Tinto Park		
1946–47	Queen's Park Hampden XI	4–1	Morriston YMCA	Lesser Hampden	Scottish	
1947–48	Mearns Amateurs	2–1	Babcock & Wilcox	Love Street		
1948–49	Greenock High School Former Pupils	3–2 aet	Castlepark Thistle	Hampden Park	Scottish	
1949–50	Queen's Park Hampden XI	1–0	Cupar Hearts	Hampden Park	Scottish	
1950–51	Queen's Park Hampden XI	5–2	Mearns Amateurs	Hampden Park	Scottish	
1951–52	Port Glasgow Hibernian	1–0	Giffnock Amateurs	Hampden Park	Scottish	
1952–53	Mearns Amateurs	5–3	Babcock & Wilcox	Hampden Park		
1953–54	Royal Technical College	1–0	Cove Rangers	Hampden Park		
1954–55	Eglinton Amateurs	2–1	Eaglesham	Hampden Park	Ayrshire	
1955–56	Milanda Amateurs	1–1	Vale of Leven Academy Former Pupils	Hampden Park		
1955–56	Milanda Amateurs	3–1	Vale of Leven Academy Former Pupils	Hampden Park		
1956–57	Giffnock North	4–2	Cupar Hearts	Hampden Park	Scottish	
1957–58	Weir Recreation	2–1	Jordanhill Teacher Training College	Hampden Park	Scottish	
1958–59	Crosshill Thistle	4–2	Eaglesham	Hampden Park	Ayrshire	
1959–60	Minishant Amateurs	2–2	Ramblos	Ibrox Park	Ayrshire	
1959–60	Minishant Amateurs	2–0	Ramblos	Hampden Park	Ayrshire	
1960–61	Glenavon Amateurs	2–1	Grangemouth Refinery	Hampden Park		
1961–62	Bearsden Amateurs	1–0	Pencaitland	Hampden Park		
1962–63	Queen's Park Hampden XI	6–0	Pencaitland	Powderhall Stadium	Scottish	
1963–64	Queen's Park Hampden XI	4–4	Fenwick Thistle	Hampden Park	Scottish	
1963–64	Queen's Park Hampden XI	3–0	Fenwick Thistle	Hampden Park	Scottish	
1964–65	National Cash Registers Dundee	6–2	Jordanhill Teacher Training College	Hampden Park	Midlands AFA	
1965–66	Jordanhill Teacher Training College	7–0	Edinburgh Albion	Hampden Park		
1966–67	Rhu Amateurs	3–1	Penilee United	Hampden Park		
1967–68	Cambusbarron Rovers	2–1	Queen's Park Hampden XI	Hampden Park	Stirling & District	
1968–69	Cambusbarron Rovers	3–2 aet	Viewfield Rovers	Hampden Park	Stirling & District	
1969–70	Douglas Amateurs	3–1 aet	Doune Castle Rovers	Hampden Park		
1970–71	Dumbarton Academy Former Pupils	1–0	Mearns Amateurs	Boghead Park		
1971–72	Douglas Amateurs	2–0	Bannockburn	Hampden Park	Scottish	
1972–73	Knockentiber	1–0	Star Hearts	Hampden Park	Ayrshire	
1973–74	Douglas Amateurs	3–1	Cambusbarron Rovers	Hampden Park	Scottish	
1974–75	Star Hearts	2–1	Morriston YMCA	Hampden Park	Kirkcaldy & District	
1975–76	Colville Park	w/o	Cambusnethan Talbot	–	Lanarkshire	
1976–77	Morriston YMCA	4–3 aet	Links United	Hampden Park		
1977–78	Cambusbarron Rovers	2–0 aet	Crosshouse Waverley	Hampden Park	Stirling & District	
1978–79	Crosshouse Waverley	4–3	Chapelhall	Hampden Park	Ayrshire	
1979–80	Newarthill Hearts	4–2	Ballingry Rovers	Hampden Park		
1980–81	Knockentiber	3–1	Bannockburn	Hampden Park	Ayrshire	
1981–82	Avon Villa	1–0	Knockentiber	Hampden Park		
1982–83	Strathclyde Police	2–0	Coatbridge Community Centre	Hampden Park	Scottish	
1983–84	Pencaitland	2–1	Clelland Miners Welfare	Hampden Park	Border	
1984–85	Drongan United	2–1	Motherwell Miners	Hampden Park	Ayrshire	
1985–86	Coatbridge Community Centre	2–1	Barr & Stroud	Hampden Park	Caledonian	
1986–87	Bannockburn	2–0	Motherwell Miners	Hampden Park	Caledonian	
1987–88	Coatbridge Community Centre	3–1	Victoria	Hampden Park	Caledonian	
1988–89	Norton House	2–2	Lawside Academy Former Pupils	Hampden Park	Kingdom Caledonian	
1989–90	St Patrick's Former Pupils	1–0	Stanley	Hampden Park	Scottish	
1990–91	Bannockburn	3–1	Blantyre Thistle	Hampden Park	Caledonian	
1991–92	Heathside	2–0	Viewfield Rovers	Hampden Park	Ayrshire	
1992–93	Bankhall Villa	2–0	Cardross Rock	Hampden Park	Central Scottish	
1993–94	Bannockburn	3–1	Galston United	Hampden Park	Caledonian	
1994–95	Heathside	1–1 aet 5–4 (p)	Norton House	Hampden Park	Ayrshire	
1995–96	Bellshill YMCA	1–0 aet	Riverside Athletic	Hampden Park	Central Scottish	
1996–97	Knockentiber	2–1	Milton	Hampden Park	Ayrshire	
1997–98	Dalziel High School Former Pupils	2–1	West Kilbride	Hampden Park	Caledonian	
1998–99	St Patrick’s High School Former Pupils	2–0 aet	Bearsden	Rugby Park	Scottish	
1999–00	Liberton Royal Mail W.B.M.	1–0	Norton House	Hampden Park	Lothian & Edinburgh	
2000–01	Dalziel High School Former Pupils	2–1	St Patrick’s High School Former Pupils	Hampden Park	Caledonian	
2001–02	Harestanes	4–2	Dumbarton Academy Former Pupils	Hampden Park	Central Scottish	
2002–03	Harestanes	1–0	Newmilns Vesuvius	Hampden Park	Central Scottish	
2003–04	Viewfield Rovers	2–0	Norton House	Hampden Park	Caledonian	
2004–05	Drumchapel Amateur	1–0	Gartcosh United	Hampden Park	Central Scottish	
2005–06	St Patrick’s High School Former Pupils	3–2	Falkirk Amateurs	Hampden Park	Scottish	
2006–07	Drumchapel United	1–0	Cupar Hearts	Hampden Park	Central Scottish	
2007–08	Eddlewood	1–0	Queen's Park Hampden XI	Hampden Park	Central Scottish	
2008–09	Queen's Park Hampden XI	3–1	Hurlford Thistle	Hampden Park	–	
2009–10	Eddlewood	1–0	Drumchapel United	Hampden Park	Central Scottish	
2010–11	Wishaw High School Former Pupils	1–1 aet 3–1 (p)	Drumchapel United	Almondvale	Central Scottish	
2011–12	Hurlford Thistle	2–0	Colville Park	Almondvale	Ayrshire	
2012–13	Wellhouse	1–1 aet 4–3 (p)	Colville Park	Almondvale	Central Scottish	
2013–14	Hurlford Thistle	3–3 aet 4–3 (p)	Colville Park	Rugby Park	Ayrshire	
2014–15	Harestanes	3–1	Craigshill Thistle	Rugby Park	Central Scottish	Preliminary round one 2015–16
2015–16	Colville Park	2–1	Leven United	Hampden Park	Central Scottish	Preliminary round two 2016–17
2016–17	Colville Park	1–0	Southside	Hampden Park	Central Scottish	Second round 2017–18
2017–18	Shortlees	2–1	Goldenhill	Hampden Park	Ayrshire	Preliminary round two 2018–19
2018–19	Colville Park	2–0	Eastfield	Hampden Park	Central Scottish	Preliminary round one 2019–20
2019–20	Tollcross Thistle	4–4 aet 3–2 (p)	Drumchapel Amateur	Hampden Park	Lothian & Edinburgh	N/A - Final not played until 2022
2020–21	No competition due to the COVID-19 pandemic					
2021–22	Tower Hearts	1–1 aet 4–3 (p)	Fallin	Hampden Park	Central Scottish	Withdrew
2022–23	Cupar Hearts	2–1	Steins Thistle	Hampden Park	Kingdom of Fife	Preliminary round two 2023–24
2023–24	Cupar Hearts	3–1	Garrowhill Thistle	Hampden Park	Kingdom of Fife	First round 2024–25
2024–25	Steins Thistle	3-1	FC Pather	Hampden Park	Central Scotland	Preliminary round one 2025–26
2025–26	Shortlees	3-2	Drumchapel	Hampden Park	Ayrshire	Preliminary round one 2026–27
