= Scottish Amateur Football League =

- Founded: 1901
- Folded: 2023
- Country: Scotland
- Confederation: UEFA
- Divisions: Premier; Division 1 Championship
- Number of clubs: 23
- Level on pyramid: 3
- Promotion to: 2 up
- Relegation to: 2 Down
- Domestic cup(s): Scottish Amateur Cup; West of Scotland Cup/ Jimmy Marshall Trophy / Centenary Cup

The Scottish Amateur Football League (SAFL) was Scotland's oldest football league competition for amateur teams in Scotland, before disbanding in 2023 when it merged with the Central Scottish Amateur League to form the Scottish Premier Amateur League.

Although the League officially records itself as having been founded in 1909, when Scottish Football League club Queen's Park decided that their fourth team needed regular competition, research published by the Scottish Football Historical Archive confirms that the league was actually founded by six clubs at a meeting at Glasgow University in late June 1901, with Paisley Academicals winning the first championship. Queen's Park were successful in winning the league title in 1909–10, but Edinburgh Civil Service won the league the following year, so Queen's Park decided to enter their third team for the third season of the competition, indicating a high standard of football was played at this level from an early stage.

== History ==
Despite being called the Scottish Amateur Football League, the league has never included clubs from across the country. Although, prior to the official formation of the league a SAFL side made at least one visit to Fife for a match. Prior to the Second World War membership stretched across the Scottish Central Belt, with a number of clubs from the East of the country participating. However, following the end of the war membership became concentrated in the West of the country. The SAFL has been successful in embracing a number of clubs from the Argyll area which otherwise might not have regular competition.

At its peak in the early 1980s, the SAFL contained 12 divisions, but for season 2020/21, there will be 3. For more than 20 years, the League was split into a Premier section of three divisions, with two or three further divisions comprising Section One, so named as it preserved the divisions of the original league. But following an SAFA directive during the 2011–12 season, this format has been changed back to one all-in competition, with effect from the start of the 2012–13 season. The three premier divisions are retained, and the lowest two divisions become two sections of equal status, decided by a balloted draw prior to the start of each season. The top two teams from each section will be promoted to Premier 2, which will start the 2012–13 season with 11 clubs, but will have 12 clubs from the start of the following season.

=== Hall of fame ===
In March 2013, the League held its inaugural Hall of Fame Dinner, attended by well over 300 guests, at which the following became the first inductees to the SAFL Hall of Fame:

- Alan Bruce (Busby AFC)
- Alan & Russel Davidson (Whitehill FP AFC)
- Eamon Gowen (Nolt Gulch Town)
- Charlie Henderson (Paisley AFC)
- Duncan McAulay (Campbeltown Pupils AFC)
- Keith Millar (Oban Saints)
- Derek Yuille (Rutherglen AFC)

== Executive Members 2021-2022 ==
Office Bearers

- Margaret McMillan – President
- Maiwill Hunman – Vice President
- Raymond McMillan – Secretary
- Derek Milton – Match Secretary
- Robert Bowman – Minutes Secretary
- Campbell McPherson - Treasurer
- Margaret McMillan – Discipline Secretary
- Stewart Cameron - Registration Secretary

Divisional Representatives

- Frank McCann – Premier
- Danny Cameron - Premier 1

== League Membership 2021-2022 ==
=== Premier ===
- Castlemilk BC
- Easthall Star
- Ffellomarghey
- Glynhill Moorcroft
- Hillington
- Inverclyde
- Kings Park Rangers
- Neilston
- Parkhall
- Rutherglen
- Port Glasgow Ams

=== Division 1 Championship ===
- Arthurlie U21's
- Baljaffray Ams
- Busby
- Cardross Ams
- Carlton YM
- Claremont
- Duncanrig FP
- Dunoon
- Glenburn
- Lochgilphead Red Star
- Port Glasgow OBU
- St.Convals
- Tarbert

== League winners ==
Year	Tier 1	Tier 2	Tier 3	Tier 4	Tier 5	Tier 6
1994	St Patrick's	Fernhill Villa	Oban Saints	Campbeltown Boys	Blairbeth	Dunoon AFC
1995	St Patrick's	Greenock High School Former Pupils	Port Glasgow Hibs	Strathclyde Police	Dunoon Ams	Westhill AFC
1996	Fernhill Villa	Torrance United	Campbeltown Boys	Busby	Glasgow Harp	Bishopbriggs AFC
1997	St Patrick's	Hamilton FP	Port Glasgow OBU	Pollok	Westhill Amateurs	Millerston Thistle
1998	Hamilton FP	Oban Saints	Pollok	Strathclyde Police	Millerston Thistle	Shamrock BC
1999	Gourock Athletic	Campbeltown Pupils	Gartcosh United	Westhill	Shamrock BC	No competition
2000	Campbeltown Pupils	Camphill	Kilbowie Union	Shamrock Boys Club	Leven Valley	No competition
2001	Gartcosh United	Kilbowie Union	Shamrock Boys Club	Rothesay Brandane	Glencastle Sparta	No competition
2002	St Patrick's	Oban Saints	Busby	Glencastle Sparta	Glasgow Harp (B)	No competition
2003	Glasgow Harp	Busby	Cumbernauld Ams	Inverclyde	East Kilbride YM FC	No competition
2004	St Patrick's	Kings Park Rangers	Inverclyde	Dunoon	Sandiefield Star	No competition
2005	St Patrick's	Kilpatrick	Eaglesham	Sandiefield Star	Leven Valley	No competition
2006	St Patrick's	Cambria AFC	Inverclyde	St Patricks FP (B)	Rosehill Star	No competition
2007	Greenock High School Former Pupils	Busby	Shawlands FP	Castlemilk Ams	Carlton YMCA (B)	No competition
2008	St Patrick's	Kilpatrick	Aikenhead Thistle	St Patricks FP (B)	Duncanrig FP (B)	No competition
2009	St. Josephs	Castlemilk AFC	Thorn Athletic	Tarbert	Haldane Utd	No competition
2010	Oban Saints	Thorn Athletic	Rolls Royce EK	Haldane United	Aikenhead Thistle B	No competition
2011	Aikenhead Thistle	Postal United	Finnart AFC	Gourock Thistle	East Kilbride YM FC	Alba Thistle
2012	Postal United	Finnart AFC	Alba Thistle	Paisley	East Kilbride FC	No competition
2013	Postal United	Alba Thistle	Campbeltown Pupils AFC	East Kilbride FC		
2014	Oban Saints AFC	Campbeltown Pupils AFC	East Kilbride FC	Drumchapel Amateurs Colts	Motherwell Thistle AFC	
2015	St. Josephs FP AFC	East Kilbride FC	Drumchapel Amateur Colts	Dumbarton Wanderers		
2016	East Kilbride FC	Drumchapel Amateurs Colts	Bridgewater AFC	Port Glasgow AFC		
2017	St Joseph's FPs	Alba Thistle	Arkleston			
2018	Goldenhill	Arkleston	Lochgilphead Red Star			
2019	St Joseph's FPs	Castlemilk BC	Glynhill Moorcroft			
2020	Competition suspended due to the COVID-19 pandemic in Scotland					
2021	Competition suspended due to the COVID-19 pandemic in Scotland					
