= Leith Amateurs F.C. =

Association football club in Edinburgh, Scotland

Leith Amateurs
- Full name: Leith Amateurs Football Club
- Founded: 1906
- Dissolved: 1939
- Ground: Meadowbank Park
Home colours

Leith Amateurs Football Club was a football club from Edinburgh in Scotland.

== History ==
The club was founded in 1905, its first recorded match being against the works side of George Gibson & Co in April 1906. The club joined the East of Scotland Football Association in 1908 and was one of the first entrants to the Scottish Amateur Cup in 1910, playing in three finals by 1926, winning the competition in 1912–13. The club also won the Scottish Amateur League for the only time in 1913–14.

The 1912–13 season also marked the club's first entry to the Scottish Cup, losing 1–0 against St Bernard's F.C. in the first qualifying round. The club continued to enter until World War 2, other than for a brief period at the start of the 1920s, when the club left the Senior ranks to play as a Junior side.

In 1923, the club became a Senior club once more by joining the East of Scotland League as a replacement for the Edinburgh Civil Service side, which withdrew after six matches. The club was an intermittent member of the League until the 1930–31 season, when a dispute over travel expenses between the Edinburgh sides and the Lowland sides in the East of Scotland League saw the Amateurs withdraw with 7 other clubs to form the Edinburgh & District League. The club remained in the Edinburgh & District League until the competition petered out in the 1934–35 season, with only 5 sides, none of whom completed their fixtures; the club re-joined the East of Scotland League.

In 1927–28, the club reached the first round proper of the national cup for the first time. Drawn away to Vale of Leven F.C., the Amateurs won 2–1 in front of a crowd of 250, to make the second round for the only time in the club's history; the Amateurs' second-round defeat at Dunfermline Athletic attracted a crowd of 1,300, paying receipts of £33. The club won through qualifying again 1929–30, only losing 2–0 at Hibernian in the first round, before a crowd of 3,300, the second Hibs goal coming in the final minute; and a third time in 1933–34, again losing in the first round, at Falkirk.

The club was still playing until the outbreak of the war, its last attempt at the Scottish Cup being a 1–0 defeat at Berwick Rangers in the first round of the Qualifying Cup in 1938–39, but finished bottom of the East of Scotland League with 1 win that season, and not having completed its fixtures. The club entered the Qualifying Cup in 1939–40, but, before it could play Peebles Rovers, the club closed down, citing "dwindling interest and support".

== Colours ==
The club's colours were black and white hoops, with black shorts.

== Ground ==
The club did not have a fixed ground for much of its existence. Apart from a season at Chancelot in 1912–13, the club's first permanent ground was at Wood's Park, which the club used from 1927 to 1929; in 1929 the club moved to Meadowbank Park.

== Honours ==
Scottish Amateur League

- Winners: 1913–14

Scottish Amateur Cup

- Winners: 1912–13
- Runners-up: 1911–12, 1925–26

East of Scotland Shield Consolation Cup

- Winners: 1924–25, 1927–28

== Notable players ==
- Norman Mackay
