= Murrayfield Amateurs F.C. =

Former amateur football club in Edinburgh, UK

Murrayfield Amateurs
- Full name: Murrayfield Amateurs Football Club
- Nickname(s): the Amateurs
- Founded: 1921
- Dissolved: 1964
- Ground: Pinkhill Park
Home colours

Murrayfield Amateurs Football Club was an amateur football club from Edinburgh, Scotland in the 20th century.

== History ==
The club was founded soon after the end of the First World War and joined the Lothian Amateur League in 1921.

=== Senior club status ===
In 1928, the club joined the East of Scotland League, which made it a senior club entitled to enter the Scottish FA Cup. It entered the national competition for the first time in 1928-29, and, at the first time of asking, won the Scottish Qualifying Cup, hammering Thornhill 8–1 in the final at Ibrox Park, before 4,000 spectators; it marked both the first time that an amateur club had won the Qualifying Cup, and the first time that a club had won the competition in its first entry.

The clubs were drawn together in the first round proper, and Murrayfield won again. In the second round, the Amateurs held Scottish League club Arbroath to a draw (the tie being played at Heart of Midlothian's Tynecastle Park, in front of a crowd of 10,000). The club lost the replay at Gayfield 5–2, having threatened a comeback after reducing the score from 4–0 to 4–2.

That first entry turned out to be the joint-furthest the club reached in the competition, the club also reaching the second round proper in the next two seasons, but the formation of Edinburgh City F.C. as an amateur League side took away some of the amateur players in the city. The club did reach the competition proper in 1930–31 after being runners-up to Inverness Citadel in the Qualifying Cup North (losing at Easter Road in a second replay), but, lost to the Lilywhites in the first round.

The club only won through qualifying for the last time in 1936–37. In the first round proper, the club was drawn against Scottish League club Morton at home in the first round proper, and wanted to switch the tie to Cappielow Park, but the SFA refused, instead allowing the club to play the tie on a Wednesday to avoid clashing with other matches in Edinburgh. The gate at Pinkhill was a mere 683, paying £31; however the club came within an ace of causing a shock. With the scores level at 3–3 in the final five minutes, the home side should have been awarded a penalty for a shove in the area, but the referee failed to spot it, "which accounted for the hubbub as he came off the field". Morton won the replay 6–1, the Amateurs' goal being a consolation when already six down. However at least the club did get its fixture at Cappielow, and shared receipts of £94 from a gate of 3,270. In the mid-1950s, the Scottish Football Association abolished the Qualifying Cup for three seasons, and the Amateurs were put into the first round, losing in the first round every time.

From 1925–26 to 1963–64, the club was a regular entrant to the East of Scotland Qualifying Cup, the finalists of which took part in the City Cup. Murrayfield won the Qualifying Cup three times, and the City Cup in 1929–30; the City Cup triumph caused some controversy, as opponent Clerwood Amateurs protested that Murrayfield's Anderson was Cup-tied, having played for Clerwood in the semi-final; Murrayfield claimed that, as the final of the competition had been held over to the start of the 1930–31 season, the Cup-tied rule did not apply - the East of Scotland FA dodged the question by declaring the complaint had not been officially lodged. The club reached the City Cup final again in 1930–31, but it was never played, due to Leith Athletic refusing to play, and the Amateurs refusing to play proposed replacement Penicuik Athletic.

In the aftermath, the club was rumoured to be putting forward an application to join the Scottish League, but declined to come forward, the vacant spot going to Edinburgh City instead.

=== Local leagues ===
The club joined the East of Scotland League in 1928–29. Before the 1930–31 season, after a dispute over travel expenses between the Edinburgh sides and the Lowland sides in the East of Scotland League, the Amateurs withdrew with 7 other clubs to form the Edinburgh & District League, and the club won the first title, with 8 wins and 2 defeats in 10 games. The club also won the title in 1932–33, but after one game in the 1934–35 season it withdrew to re-join the East of Scotland League.

=== Amateur Cup ===
The club had significant success in the Scottish Amateur Cup, winning all of its five finals between 1925 and 1939. However it did not reach the final again after World War 2.

=== End of the club ===
The club remained in the East of Scotland League, and as an entrant in the East of Scotland Qualifying Cup, until 1963–64; after finishing bottom but one for the second consecutive season, the club was dissolved.

== Colours ==
The club played in black and red hooped shirts with white shorts.

== Grounds ==
The club originally played in Murrayfield Park, from which the club took its name. By 1929 the club was playing at Pinkhill Park In 1957, the club moved to the Meadowbank Stadium, recently vacated by the liquidated Leith Athletic.

== Notable players ==
- Tommy Pearson, who joined Newcastle United from the club in 1933
- Frank Harper, goalkeeper with Cowdenbeath F.C. and East Stirlingshire F.C., who played in the two ties with Morton
