= Portland Park, Galston =

Football ground in Galston, Scotland

Portland Park
- Location within East Ayrshire
- Location: Galston, Scotland
- Coordinates: 55.6030°N 4.3891°W
- Surface: Grass
- Record attendance: 4,211

Tenant
- Galston F.C.

Portland Park was a football ground in Galston, Scotland. It was the home ground of Galston F.C.

== History ==
Galston were playing at Portland Park when they were elected to Division Three of the Scottish Football League in 1923, and at the time the facilities consisted of a covered stand and pavilion on the southern side of the pitch. The first SFL match was played at the ground on 19 August 1923, a 2–0 win over Solway Star.

In 1926 the club resigned from the league as Division Three was heading for disbandment; the final SFL match at Portland Park on 9 January 1926 saw the club win 8–2 against Johnstone with 300 in attendance. The ground's record attendance of 4,211 was set for a Scottish Cup first round match against Kilmarnock on 26 January 1935, with the visitors winning 1–0.

After the club folded in 1940 the site of Portland Park was used to build the A71 bypass.
