= Moorpark F.C. =

Former association football club in Scotland

Moorpark
- Full name: Moorpark Amateurs F.C.
- Founded: 1906
- Dissolved: 2008
- Ground: Newmains Park
Home colours

Moorpark Football Club, also known as Moorpark Amateurs, was a Scottish football team located in the town of Renfrew that competed in the Scottish Cup from 1914 to 1949.

== History ==
The club was founded in 1906 by boys from Moorpark School in Renfrew, and was originally known as Moorpark Crusaders, changing the club name in 1920–21.

=== Scottish Cup ===
As a senior club, the club was entitled to enter the Scottish Qualifying Cup and did so from 1914 to 1949. The club reached the first round proper (last 64) of the Cup itself seven times, but never won through to the second round. Its seven defeats marks the highest number of ties in the main rounds of the Scottish Cup for a club which has lost every one.

In order to play in the competition proper, the club had to win through at least two rounds of the Scottish Qualifying Cup; in 1928–29 the club achieved this thanks to getting two byes. The best run the club had in the Qualifying Cup competition was reaching the semi-final of the northern section (fourth round) in 1937–38, at which stage it lost 2–0 to Blairgowrie. It was also the last time the club made the first round proper; it lost 5–2 at home to Larbert Amateurs before 300 spectators.

The club never came close to winning a first round tie, although it was unfortunate in 1928–29 against Armadale, to be reduced to ten men for much of the match due to injury. In 1936–37, the club was drawn at home to Hamilton Academical, and tried to switch the tie to the Acas' Douglas Park (for a better gate) on the basis that "part of their barricade was down". The Scottish Football Association was taking a hard line against switching ties and the game took place at Newmains, attracting an attendance of nearly 1,000, and a gate of £35. In the match itself, Hamilton took a three-goal lead in the first quarter of an hour, and went in at half-time 4–0 up; the match ended 7–1 to the visitors.

The club lost its senior Scottish Football Association membership in 1949 as the Scottish FA declared its ground no longer to be "up to scratch"; Moorpark was therefore unable to enter the Scottish Cup again.

=== Amateur competitions ===
The club had a lot more success on the amateur field before World War 2. The club won the Scottish Amateur Cup in 1923–24, beating Greenock High School Former Pupils in the final at Cappielow Park, thanks to a goal from Manson; it was twice runner-up. The club also took the West of Scotland Amateur Cup in 1923–24, a double few clubs achieved.

The club also won the Scottish Amateur Football League in 1922–23, 1924–25, and 1925–26.

=== Post-war ===
After its last Scottish Cup entry, the club continued at a much lower level, leaving the West of Scotland League for sixth division of the Paisley & District Amateur League in 1983, and in 1987 the club won the Victoria Cup, for amateur sides in Renfrewshire, giving the club its first trophy for 20 years.

By reaching the final of the same competition in 1998, the club qualified to play in the Renfrewshire Cup for the last time. The last record of the club is its playing in the third division of the Greater Glasgow League in 2007–08.

== Colours ==
The club's first kit was black and white narrow hooped jerseys, with navy shorts and black stockings. By 1922 the club was playing in white shirts and black shorts and stockings, the scheme it kept for most of its pre-war existence, briefly changing to black with a white collar from 1925 to 1927 and in 1937. After World War 2, the club changed to red. By 1987 the club was wearing blue and black striped shirts with black shorts.

== Ground ==
The club's original ground was Broadloan, on Victory Gardens, behind Hawthorn Cottages. In 1919 it used the Renfrew Cricket Club ground at King's Inch, for two seasons, before moving to Newmains Park in Renfrew.

After the Second World War, the club was forced to move back to King's Inch after the local authority sold Newmains Park, and used Western Park for cup ties. The club was able to use Newmains once more after King's Inch was taken over for port building in the 1950s.

== Notable figures ==
- Evelyn Morrison, centre-forward for the club until 1927.
- Bob Paton, who joined Partick Thistle from the club in 1924.
- James Fleming, President of the Scottish FA, was a representative of Moorpark in the 1930s.
