= Queen's Park Shield =

Scottish football tournament

- Founded: 1921; 105 years ago
- Region: Scotland
- Teams: 16 (2019–20)
- Current champions: Heriot Watt University
- Most championships: Edinburgh University
- Broadcaster: Setanta Sports/BBC Alba

The Queen's Park Shield is a football tournament for Scottish universities and colleges.

== History ==
The shield was donated to the Scottish Amateur Football Association by Queen's Park Football Club of Glasgow in 1921. The Shield was intended to be for competition between teams representing the four Ancient Universities of Scotland – Aberdeen, Edinburgh, Glasgow and St Andrews. The inaugural competition was won by Aberdeen University.

The shield itself has a solid silver front with the crests of the four ancient universities surrounding an image of Hampden Park. A figure wearing a Queen's Park strip is on top. This is rare because the image is of Hampden Park before redevelopment.

Since the expansion of university numbers in Scotland, the competition has become in effect the elite cup for university football in Scotland. For a time, until the re-organisation of the British Universities and Colleges Sport leagues, it constituted the top division of university football in Scotland, but has now reverted to a knock-out cup.

In the 2019 Season Edinburgh College made history by becoming the first ever College to win the shield in the 98 years of the competition, defeating the most successful club Edinburgh University 5-4 on penalties.

== Past winners ==
Year	Winner
1922	Aberdeen University
1923	Aberdeen University
1924	Glasgow University
1925	St Andrews University
1926	St Andrews University
1927	Glasgow University
1928	Aberdeen University
1929	Edinburgh University
1930	Aberdeen University
1931	Edinburgh University
1932	Edinburgh University
1933	Aberdeen University
1934	Edinburgh University
1935	Edinburgh University
1936	Glasgow University
1937	Aberdeen University
1938	Aberdeen University
1939	Glasgow University
1940	Glasgow University
1941	Aberdeen University
1942	Edinburgh University
1943	St Andrews University
1944	Glasgow University
1945	Glasgow University
1946	Aberdeen University
1947	Aberdeen University
1948	Edinburgh University
1949	Aberdeen University
1950	Aberdeen University
1951	Aberdeen University
1952	Glasgow University
1953	Edinburgh University
1954	Glasgow University
1955	Aberdeen University
1956	Glasgow University
1957	Aberdeen University
1958	Edinburgh University
1959	Edinburgh University
1960	Glasgow University
1961	Glasgow University
1962	Edinburgh University
1963	Aberdeen University
1964	Glasgow University
1965	Glasgow University
1966	Aberdeen University
1967	Edinburgh University
1968	Glasgow University
1969	Aberdeen University
1970	Aberdeen University
1971	Glasgow University
1972	Glasgow University
1973	Glasgow University / Heriot-Watt University
1974	Edinburgh University
1975	Edinburgh University
1976	Edinburgh University
1977	Edinburgh University
1978	Edinburgh University
1979	Edinburgh University
1980	Edinburgh University
1981	Edinburgh University
1982	Stirling University
1983	Stirling University
1984	Dundee University / Stirling University
1985	Stirling University
1986	Strathclyde University
1987	Dundee University
1988	Aberdeen University
1989	Stirling University
1990	Edinburgh University
1991	Glasgow University
1992	Edinburgh University
1993	Heriot-Watt University
1994	Edinburgh University
1995	Edinburgh Napier University
1996	Edinburgh University
1997	Edinburgh Napier University
1998	Strathclyde University
1999	Edinburgh University
2000	Edinburgh University
2001	Stirling University
2002	Stirling University
2003	Stirling University
2004	Heriot-Watt University
2005	Heriot-Watt University
2006	Heriot-Watt University
2007	Heriot-Watt University
2008	Heriot-Watt University
2009	Stirling University
2010	Stirling University
2011	Edinburgh University
2012	Stirling University
2013	Stirling University
2014	Stirling University
2015	Edinburgh University
2016	Strathclyde University
2017	Stirling University
2018	St Andrews University
2019	Edinburgh College
2020	Not completed
2021	No competition
2022	Heriot-Watt University
2023	University of Stirling
2024	Heriot-Watt University
2025	University of Stirling
2026	Heriot-Watt University
