= The Football League XI =

Representative side of the Football League

The English Football League XI was a representative side of the Football League. The team regularly played against the Scottish Football League XI and other national league select teams between 1891 and 1976.

For a long period the annual fixture between the English and Scottish leagues was only second in importance to the matches between the two national teams. The fixture declined in importance, however, particularly after regular European club competition was instituted in the 1950s. Later matches were played irregularly and poorly attended, with the last match against the Scottish league being played in March 1976. Other than the Inter-league fixtures, a match was played against the England national team in 1963 as part of the Football Association's centenary celebrations, ending in a 3–3 draw at the Arsenal Stadium.

Aside from one-off exhibition matches against the Glasgow Football Association in 1977 (a 2–1 loss, celebrating the Silver Jubilee of Elizabeth II) and against a 'World XI' at Wembley (a 3–0 victory, which was part of the League's centenary celebrations), the Football League XI's most recent games have been against the Italian League, which was a regular fixture through the 1990s and was most recently played as an Under-21 fixture in 2006.

== Results by opponent ==
As of 10:59, 28 February 2014 (UTC)

Opponent	P	W	D	L	%W	%D	%L
(Scotland) Scottish Football League XI (Note: This total includes two Victory Inter-league matches played in 1919 and one match played during the Second World War. In both World Wars, regular league football was suspended.)	75	42	14	19	56	18.7	25.3
(Ireland) / (Northern Ireland) Irish Football League XI	63	54	6	3	85.7	9.5	4.8
(Republic of Ireland) League of Ireland XI	17	14	2	1	82.4	11.8	5.9
(Italy) Serie A/Serie B	13	x	x	x	x	x	x
(England) Southern League XI	6	4	1	1	66.7	16.7	16.7
(United Kingdom) Army XI	2	2	0	0	100	0	0
(England) Football Alliance XI	1	0	1	0	0	100	0
(Belgium) Belgian League XI	1	0	1	0	0	100	0
Wales & Ireland XI	1	1	0	0	100	0	0
England	1	0	1	0	0	100	0
(Scotland) Glasgow XI	1	0	0	1	0	0	100
(United Kingdom) All British XI	1	0	1	0	0	100	0
Rest of the World	1	1	0	0	100	0	0

P – Played; W – Won; D – Drawn; L – Lost
