= List of Hamilton Academical F.C. players =

The following is a list of Hamilton Academical F.C. players who have played a first team league game for Hamilton Academical.

== Current players ==
As of match played 21 November 2026

| Name | Nation | Years | Apps | Goals | Notes |
|---|---|---|---|---|---|
| Stuart Bannigan | Scotland | 2026– | 16 | 1 | |
| Ben Black | Scotland | 2025– | 9 | 0 | |
| Cameron Blues | Scotland | 2026– | 15 | 3 | |
| Steven Bradley | Scotland | 2024– | 64 | 6 | |
| Aaron Comrie | Scotland | 2026– | 16 | 0 | |
| Ali Crawford | Scotland | 2010–2018, 2026– | 230 | 32 | |
| Gregor Crookston | Scotland | 2026, 2026– | 24 | 1 | (Note: First spell on loan from Heart of Midlothian) |
| Aaron Eadie | Scotland | 2025– | 7 | 0 | |
| Tony Gallacher | Scotland | 2025– | 49 | 2 | |
| Stephen Hendrie | Scotland | 2011–2015, 2023– | 188 | 2 | |
| Josh Lane | Scotland | 2025– | 16 | 0 | |
| Dean Lyness | England | 2024– | 46 | 0 | |
| Kyle MacDonald | Scotland | 2023– | 102 | 15 | |
| Michael Marks | Scotland | 2025– | 0 | 0 | |
| Aiden McGinley | Scotland | 2026– | 2 | 0 | |
| Dylan McGowan | Australia | 2023, 2023–2025, 2026– | 60 | 2 | (Note: First spell on loan from Kilmarnock) |
| Barrie McKay | Scotland | 2026– | 2 | 0 | |
| Stuart McKinstry | Scotland | 2024– | 68 | 10 | |
| Liam Morgan | Scotland | 2023– | 15 | 1 | |
| Cian Newbury | Scotland | 2022– | 23 | 0 | |
| Kalvin Orsi | Scotland | 2026– | 11 | 1 | |
| Fergus Owens | Scotland | 2022–2026, 2026– | 36 | 0 | |
| Andy Ryan | Scotland | 2011–2015, 2021–2023, 2026– | 133 | 29 | |
| Dominic Shiels | Scotland | 2025– | 10 | 0 | |
| Kai Smutek | Wales | 2026, 2026– | 28 | 1 | |
| Taylor Sutherland | Scotland | 2026– | 2 | 0 | |
| Marcus Syme | Scotland | 2025– | 2 | 0 | |
| Dom Thomas | Scotland | 2026– | 16 | 1 | |

== Former players ==
| Name | Nation | Career (Note: Career refers to years from first to last league appearance) | Apps | Goals | Notes |
|---|---|---|---|---|---|
| Blair Adams | England | 2017 | 5 | 0 | |
| Scott Agnew | Scotland | 2005–2007 | 10 | 0 | |
| Walter Agnew | Scotland | 1958–1959 | 21 | 2 | |
| Kemy Agustien | Curaçao | 2016 | 2 | 0 | |
| Chris Aitken | Scotland | 2003–2005 | 50 | 8 | |
| Kayden Aitken | Scotland | 2025–2026 | 1 | 0 | |
| Lucas Akins | England | 2008–2010 | 11 | 0 | |
| Charlie Albinson | England | 2024–2025 | 17 | 0 | |
| George Allan | Scotland | 1899–1901 | 21 | 0 | |
| Harry Allan | Scotland | 1898–1900 | 16 | 0 | |
| John Allan | Scotland | 1932–1934 | 15 | 2 | |
| William Allan | Scotland | 1928–1933 | 191 | 0 | |
| Blair Alston | Scotland | 2019–2020 | 19 | 1 | |
| Bruce Anderson | Scotland | 2021 | 13 | 2 | (Note: On loan from Aberdeen) |
| Grant Anderson | Scotland | 2011–2012 | 21 | 3 | |
| Stan Anderson | Scotland | 1957–1959, 1961–1962, 1963–1966 | 209 | 43 | |
| Tony Andreu | France | 2013–2015, 2019 | 75 | 26 | (Note: Second spell on loan from Coventry City) |
| Marvin Andrews | Trinidad and Tobago | 2009–2010 | 2 | 0 | |
| Scott Anson | Scotland | 2005–2006 | 1 | 0 | |
| Mickaël Antoine-Curier | Guadeloupe | 2009–2010, 2011, 2013–2015 | 89 | 31 | (Note: First spell on loan from Dundee) |
| Derek Asamoah | Ghana | 2009 | 3 | 0 | |
| Benny Ashley-Seal | England | 2023 | 8 | 1 | |
| Doug Baird | Scotland | 1970–1971 | 2 | 0 | |
| Stuart Balmer | Scotland | 2005–2006 | 15 | 1 | |
| Crawford Baptie | Scotland | 1993–1997 | 111 | 3 | |
| Jamie Barjonas | Scotland | 2023–2025 | 66 | 5 | |
| Xavier Barrau | France | 2008 | 4 | 0 | |
| Adrian Beck | Germany | 2019–2020 | 6 | 0 | (Note: On loan from Union Saint-Gilloise) |
| Tom Bennett | Scotland | 2005 | 1 | 0 | |
| Neil Berry | Scotland | 1998–1999 | 15 | 1 | |
| Guillaume Beuzelin | France | 2009–2010 | 7 | 0 | |
| Botti Biabi | Scotland | 2017–2018 | 5 | 0 | (Note: On loan from Swansea City) |
| Rakish Bingham | England | 2016–2019 | 81 | 11 | |
| Ryan Blackadder | Scotland | 2003–2005 | 26 | 0 | |
| John Blackley | Scotland | 1982–1983 | 38 | 0 | |
| Mason Bloomfield | England | 2018–2019 | 5 | 1 | (Note: On loan from Norwich City) |
| Phil Bonnyman | Scotland | 1973–1975 | 71 | 7 | |
| Andy Bowman | Scotland | 1965–1966 | 11 | 0 | |
| Steven Boyd | Scotland | 2015–2019 | 45 | 3 | |
| Ally Brazil | Scotland | 1986–1987 | 24 | 0 | |
| Hutton Bremner | Scotland | 1946–1947 | 15 | 4 | |
| John Brogan | Scotland | 1984–1987 | 95 | 35 | |
| Eamonn Brophy | Scotland | 2013–2017 | 66 | 7 | |
| Ellis Brown | England | 2022–2023 | 14 | 0 | |
| George Brown | Scotland | 1953–1955 | 43 | 19 | |
| John Brown | Scotland | 1979–1984 | 133 | 11 | |
| Willie Brownlie | Scotland | 1904–1910 | 163 | 0 | |
| Fredrik Brustad | Norway | 2018–2019 | 14 | 1 | (Note: On loan from Molde) |
| David Buchanan | Northern Ireland | 2010–2011 | 28 | 1 | |
| James Bulloch | Scotland | 1929–1938 | 231 | 2 | |
| Hugh Burns | Scotland | 1986–1987, 1990–1991 | 38 | 7 | (Note: First spell on loan from Rangers) |
| Stuart Callaghan | Scotland | 2000–2003 | 94 | 20 | |
| Ross Callachan | Scotland | 2020–2021 | 33 | 10 | |
| Finlay Cameron | Scotland | 2025–2026 | 5 | 0 | |
| Martin Canning | Scotland | 2008–2017 | 215 | 8 | (Note: Became player-manager and then manager) |
| David Carney | Australia | 2004–2005 | 8 | 0 | |
| Brian Carrigan | Scotland | 2003–2006, 2008 | 85 | 26 | |
| Mark Carrington | England | 2011 | 12 | 0 | |
| Damián Casalinuovo | Argentina | 2010–2011 | 19 | 0 | |
| Chris Casement | Northern Ireland | 2008–2009 | 1 | 0 | (Note: On loan from Ipswich Town) |
| Bill Cassidy | Scotland | 1958 | 1 | 0 | |
| Mark Caughey | Northern Ireland | 1986–1988 | 21 | 13 | |
| Tomáš Černý | Czech Republic | 2007–2009, 2009–2012 | 133 | 0 | (Note: First spell on loan from SK Sigma Olomouc) |
| Paul Chalmers | Scotland | 1993–1995 | 44 | 7 | |
| James Chambers | Republic of Ireland | 2011 | 19 | 2 | |
| Chic Charnley | Scotland | 1988–1989 | 14 | 0 | |
| Scott Christie | Scotland | 2011–2013 | 3 | 0 | |
| Gary Clark | Scotland | 1991–1999, 2000–2001 | 238 | 48 | |
| Ian Cochrane | Scotland | 1983–1984 | 19 | 0 | |
| Will Collar | England | 2019–2021 | 22 | 1 | |
| Gerry Collins | Scotland | 1985–1989 | 94 | 5 | |
| Alan Combe | Scotland | 2011 | 1 | 0 | |
| Steve Convery | Scotland | 2003–2005 | 28 | 6 | |
| Mark Corcoran | Scotland | 2003–2005, 2008–2009 | 85 | 6 | |
| Jackie Cox | Scotland | 1931–1938 | 196 | 3 | |
| John Cox | Scotland | 1955 | 1 | 0 | |
| Albert Craig | Scotland | 1986–1987, 1988 | 22 | 6 | (Note: Second spell on loan from Newcastle United) |
| David Craig | Scotland | 1995–1996, 1997–1998 | 49 | 3 | |
| Joe Craig | Scotland | 1981–1983 | 54 | 14 | |
| Colin Cramb | Scotland | 1991–1993, 2005 | 58 | 12 | |
| Ian Crawford | Scotland | 1953–1954 | 19 | 3 | |
| Tom Crawley | Scotland | 1932–1934 | 46 | 25 | |
| Gerry Crossley | Republic of Ireland | 1999–2000 | 17 | 1 | |
| Ross Cunningham | Scotland | 2015–2020 | 21 | 3 | |
| Eddie Cunnington | Scotland | 1997–2000, 2001–2003 | 136 | 7 | |
| Blair Currie | Scotland | 2012, 2013–2015 | 7 | 0 | |
| Paul Currie | Scotland | 2011–2012 | 9 | 2 | |
| Kevin Cuthbert | Scotland | 2012–2014 | 70 | 0 | |
| Alexandre D'Acol | Brazil | 2015–2017 | 44 | 7 | |
| Andy Dales | England | 2020 | 2 | 0 | (Note: On loan from Scunthorpe United) |
| Jake Davidson | Scotland | 2024 | 14 | 2 | (Note: On loan from Inverness Caledonian Thistle) |
| Steve Davies | England | 2019–2020 | 22 | 4 | |
| Lucas de Bolle | Scotland | 2022–2023 | 17 | 1 | (Note: On loan from Newcastle United) |
| Jim Dempsey | Scotland | 1969–1971, 1976–1981 | 138 | 5 | |
| Kenny Deuchar | Scotland | 2009 | 8 | 0 | |
| Michael Devlin | Scotland | 2011–2018 | 125 | 4 | |
| Oumar Diaby | France | 2016 | 6 | 0 | |
| Billy Dickson | Scotland | 1977–1978 | 3 | 0 | |
| Greg Docherty | Scotland | 2013–2018 | 94 | 6 | |
| Robert Docherty | Scotland | 1983, 1987 | 8 | 0 | (Note: First spell on loan from St Mirren) |
| Massimo Donati | Italy | 2016–2018 | 41 | 2 | |
| Michael Doyle | Scotland | 2022–2023 | 21 | 0 | |
| Peter Duffield | England | 1993–1995 | 72 | 39 | |
| Brian Easton | Scotland | 2006–2009, 2010, 2019–2023 | 195 | 2 | (Note: Second spell on loan from Burnley) |
| David Elebert | Republic of Ireland | 2006–2011 | 135 | 8 | |
| Stuart Elliott | Northern Ireland | 2010 | 5 | 0 | |
| Tom Elliott | England | 2011–2011 | 7 | 0 | |
| Stephen Ettien | France | 2008–2009 | 6 | 0 | |
| Grant Evans | Scotland | 2007–2011 | 13 | 0 | |
| Steve Evans | Scotland | 1985 | 2 | 0 | |
| Tommy Ewing | Scotland | 1967–1971 | 12 | 6 | (Note: Retired as a player in order to become manager) |
| Peter Farrell | England | 1986–1987 | 3 | 0 | |
| Jamie Fairlie | Scotland | 1974–1984, 1987–1989 | 332 | 81 | |
| Brown Ferguson | Scotland | 2005–2006 | 29 | 7 | |
| Charlie Ferguson | Scotland | 1953–1954 | 10 | 0 | |
| Derek Ferguson | Scotland | 2003–2005 | 21 | 0 | |
| Ian Ferguson | Scotland | 1999–2000 | 10 | 4 | |
| Lewis Ferguson | Scotland | 2017–2018 | 13 | 0 | |
| Rikki Ferguson | Scotland | 1974–1988 | 452 | 0 | |
| Ryan Finnie | Scotland | 2012–2014 | 5 | 0 | |
| Gary Fisher | Scotland | 2012–2013 | 28 | 0 | (Note: On loan from Kilmarnock) |
| Paul Fitzpatrick | England | 1993–1994 | 18 | 1 | |
| Markus Fjørtoft | Norway | 2019–2020 | 9 | 0 | |
| Derek Fleming | Scotland | 2005–2007 | 38 | 2 | |
| Owain Fôn Williams | Wales | 2019–2020 | 15 | 0 | |
| Campbell Forrest | Scotland | 2026 | 7 | 0 | (Note: On loan from Motherwell) |
| Alex Forsyth | Scotland | 1983–1985 | 63 | 9 | |
| Gabriel Forsyth | Scotland | 2022–2023 | 2 | 0 | |
| Gary Fraser | Scotland | 2011–2013 | 15 | 0 | |
| Mark Fulton | Scotland | 1987–1988 | 19 | 0 | |
| Ryan Fulton | Scotland | 2017–2024 | 103 | 0 | |
| Iain Fyfe | Australia | 2004–2005 | 18 | 0 | |
| Eddie Gallagher | Scotland | 1988 | 14 | 3 | |
| Jesús García | Spain | 2013–2017 | 67 | 6 | |
| Johnny Garvie | Scotland | 1947–1948 | 5 | 1 | (Note: On loan from Hibernian) |
| Paul George | Republic of Ireland | 2014 | 6 | 0 | (Note: On loan from Celtic) |
| Tony Gervaise | Scotland | 1984–1985 | 9 | 0 | |
| George Gibson | Scotland | 1925–1927 | 73 | 16 | |
| James Gibson | Scotland | 2007–2011 | 43 | 2 | |
| Mark Gilhaney | Scotland | 2005–2008 | 90 | 10 | |
| Grant Gillespie | Scotland | 2009–2018 | 199 | 4 | |
| Tony Glavin | Scotland | 1978–1979 | 14 | 5 | |
| Alex Gogić | Cyprus | 2017–2020 | 70 | 2 | |
| Jim Goodwin | Republic of Ireland | 2010–2011 | 14 | 0 | |
| Andy Goram | Scotland | 2001 | 1 | 0 | |
| Ziggy Gordon | Scotland | 2011–2016, 2018–2019 | 174 | 7 | |
| Kyle Gourlay | Scotland | 2019–2021 | 10 | 0 | |
| Gary Gow | Scotland | 2008–2010 | 1 | 0 | |
| James Grady | Scotland | 2008–2009 | 5 | 1 | |
| Ally Graham | Scotland | 2002–2003 | 28 | 5 | |
| Andy Graham | Scotland | 2010–2011 | 14 | 0 | |
| Bobby Graham | Scotland | 1977–1981 | 118 | 42 | |
| David Graham | Scotland | 2007, 2007–2009 | 36 | 4 | (Note: First spell on loan from Gretna) |
| Arthur Grant | Scotland | 1984 | 6 | 0 | |
| Darren Gribben | Scotland | 2002–2004 | 27 | 3 | |
| Ellis Hall | England | 1919–1922 | 118 | 3 | |
| Robert Halliday | Scotland | 2004–2005 | 1 | 0 | |
| Bryn Halliwell | England | 2007–2008 | 23 | 0 | |
| George Hamilton | Scotland | 1955 | 11 | 2 | |
| Jamie Hamilton | Scotland | 2019–2024 | 69 | 2 | |
| Willie Hamilton | Scotland | 1971–1972 | 13 | 0 | |
| John Hanlon | Scotland | 1913–1919, 1919–1922 | 184 | 27 | |
| Robert Harrison | Scotland | 1934–1937 | 124 | 72 | |
| Paul Hartley | Scotland | 1994–1996 | 47 | 11 | |
| Nigel Hasselbaink | Netherlands | 2010–2011, 2015 | 37 | 4 | |
| Jake Hastie | Scotland | 2024 | 14 | 3 | (Note: On loan from Hartlepool United) |
| Richard Hastings | Canada | 2009–2010 | 17 | 0 | |
| Paul Hegarty | Scotland | 1972–1974 | 81 | 22 | |
| Darren Henderson | Scotland | 1998–2000 | 52 | 9 | |
| Euan Henderson | Scotland | 2023–2025 | 63 | 11 | |
| Michael Hewitt | Scotland | 2023–2024 | 17 | 1 | |
| John Hillcoat | Scotland | 1996, 1997, 1998–1999 | 11 | 0 | |
| Joe Hilton | England | 2021–2022 | 16 | 0 | (Note: On loan from Blackburn Rovers.) |
| Sandy Hodge | Scotland | 2003–2006 | 77 | 1 | |
| Lee Hodson | Northern Ireland | 2020–2021 | 33 | 1 | (Note: On loan from Gillingham) |
| Myles Hogarth | Scotland | 1997–1998 | 5 | 0 | (Note: On loan from Hearts) |
| Neil Hood | Scotland | 1972–1975 | 104 | 44 | |
| David Hopkirk | Scotland | 2010–2011 | 8 | 0 | |
| Ronan Hughes | Scotland | 2015–2022 | 46 | 3 | |
| Johnny Hunt | England | 2019–2020 | 16 | 0 | |
| Gordon Hunter | Scotland | 1999–2000 | 22 | 1 | |
| Sandy Hunter | Scotland | 1921–1928, 1932–1934 | 190 | 0 | |
| David Hutton | Scotland | 2011–2012 | 19 | 0 | |
| Zander Hutton | Scotland | 2025–2026 | 29 | 1 | (Note: On loan from Rangers.) |
| Dougie Imrie | Scotland | 2010–2012, 2014–2019 | 240 | 35 | |
| Izzy Iriekpen | England | 2009 | 2 | 0 | |
| Darren Jamieson | Scotland | 2016–2018 | 2 | 0 | |
| Jean-Philippe Javary | France | 2005 | 13 | 1 | |
| Raymond Jellema | Scotland | 2003–2007 | 24 | 0 | |
| George Jenkins | Canada | 1946–1947 | 2 | 0 | |
| Ross Jenkins | England | 2018 | 11 | 0 | |
| Justin Johnson | Netherlands | 2020–2021 | 5 | 0 | |
| Graeme Jones | England | 2005–2006 | 13 | 3 | |
| Juanjo | Spain | 2006 | 11 | 1 | (Note: On loan from Inverness Caledonian Thistle) |
| Gravine Kalala | Scotland | 2023–2025 | 1 | 0 | |
| Vic Kasule | Scotland | 1989–1990 | 12 | 0 | |
| James Keatings | Scotland | 2012–2013, 2013–2014, 2018–2019 | 55 | 16 | (Note: First spell on loan from Celtic) |
| Pat Keogh | Scotland | 2004–2006 | 46 | 9 | |
| Daniel Kelly | Scotland | 1913–1919 | 159 | 64 | |
| Dan Kelly | Scotland | 1924–1927 | 50 | 15 | |
| Sam Kelly | England | 2018–2019 | 6 | 0 | |
| Kai Kennedy | Scotland | 2022 | 7 | 1 | |
| Dylan Kerr | England | 2001, 2003 | 33 | 3 | |
| Jim Kerr | Scotland | 1987–1988 | 33 | 0 | |
| Lee Kilday | Scotland | 2011–2014, 2023–2026 | 105 | 5 | |
| Matthew Kilgallon | England | 2018–2019 | 25 | 0 | |
| James King | Scotland | 1929–1939 | 265 | 85 | |
| Makenzie Kirk | Scotland | 2024 | 8 | 0 | (Note: On loan from Hearts) |
| Jordan Kirkpatrick | Scotland | 2008–2012 | 20 | 0 | |
| John Paul Kissock | England | 2009 | 3 | 0 | |
| Leon Knight | England | 2009–2010 | 6 | 0 | |
| Miodrag Krivokapić | Yugoslavia | 1997–1999 | 3 | 0 | |
| Antons Kurakins | Latvia | 2015–2016 | 36 | 0 | |
| Gramoz Kurtaj | Germany | 2015–2017 | 47 | 3 | |
| Wale Kwik-Ajet | Nigeria | 2001 | 5 | 0 | |
| Ricki Lamie | Scotland | 2025 | 10 | 1 | (Note: On loan from Ross County) |
| Lewis Latona | Scotland | 2023–2025 | 1 | 0 | |
| Steve Lawson | Togo | 2022–2023 | 37 | 3 | |
| Dick Little | England | 1919–1921 | 81 | 6 | |
| Jackson Longridge | Scotland | 2023–2025 | 56 | 2 | |
| Louis Longridge | Scotland | 2012–2018 | 133 | 14 | |
| Cale Loughrey | Canada | 2025–2026 | 19 | 0 | |
| David Louhoungou | Congo | 2009 | 9 | 0 | |
| John Lowe | Scotland | 1935–1939 | 73 | 1 | |
| Lucas | Brazil | 2015–2016 | 40 | 5 | |
| Derek Lyle | Scotland | 2008–2011, 2011 | 40 | 2 | |
| Darren Lyon | Scotland | 2014–2018 | 61 | 3 | |
| Kieran MacDonald | Scotland | 2014–2015, 2021–2022 | 40 | 2 | |
| Graeme MacGregor | Scotland | 2012 | 1 | 0 | (Note: On loan from Bolton Wanderers) |
| Darian MacKinnon | Scotland | 2012–2020, 2025–2026 | 217 | 10 | |
| Barry Maguire | Scotland | 2024–2026 | 34 | 0 | |
| Jacob Marsden | England | 2018–2019 | 1 | 0 | |
| Aaron Martin | England | 2020–2021 | 24 | 0 | |
| Alan Martin | Scotland | 2015–2016 | 1 | 0 | |
| James Martin | Scotland | 2012–2013 | 1 | 0 | |
| Scott Martin | Scotland | 2018–2025 | 162 | 2 | |
| Gary Mason | Scotland | 2009 | 5 | 0 | |
| Luke Matheson | England | 2021–2022 | 9 | 0 | (Note: On loan from Wolverhampton Wanderers.) |
| Remi Matthews | England | 2016–2017 | 17 | 0 | |
| Stevie May | Scotland | 2012–2013 | 34 | 24 | (Note: On loan from St Johnstone) |
| Jim McAlister | Scotland | 2010–2012 | 55 | 1 | |
| James McArthur | Scotland | 2005–2010 | 168 | 10 | |
| Kevin McBride | Scotland | 2011 | 6 | 0 | |
| James McCarthy | Republic of Ireland | 2006–2009 | 95 | 13 | |
| Trent McClenahan | Australia | 2008–2010 | 50 | 0 | |
| Charlie McCormack | Scotland | 1924–1928 | 101 | 7 | |
| Gary McDonald | Scotland | 2010–2011 | 25 | 0 | |
| Paul McDonald | Scotland | 1986–1993, 2001–2013 | 256 | 26 | |
| Conner McGlinchey | Scotland | 2011–2013 | 13 | 0 | |
| Chris McGinn | Scotland | 2022–2024 | 12 | 0 | |
| Sean McGinty | Republic of Ireland | 2024–2025 | 35 | 1 | |
| Joe McGlynn | Scotland | 2023–2024 | 10 | 3 | |
| Michael McGovern | Northern Ireland | 2014–2016 | 75 | 0 | |
| Paul McGowan | Scotland | 2009 | 13 | 1 | |
| Aaron McGowan | England | 2018–2020 | 57 | 3 | |
| Adam McGowan | Scotland | 2021–2023 | 5 | 0 | |
| Jaison McGrath | Scotland | 2013–2015 | 4 | 0 | |
| Ciaran McKenna | Scotland | 2019–2020 | 4 | 0 | |
| Willie McLaren (1) | Scotland | 1931–1936 | 138 | 33 | |
| Willie McLaren (2) | Scotland | 2011 | 3 | 0 | |
| John McLaughlin | Scotland | 1910–1913, 1918–1919 | 92 | 11 | |
| Mark McLaughlin | Scotland | 2004–2012 | 197 | 17 | |
| Willie McLaughlin | Scotland | 1903–1904, 1909–1912 | 99 | 14 | |
| Jim McLean | Scotland | 1956–1960 | 129 | 57 | |
| Bobby McLuckie | Scotland | 2025–2026 | 14 | 0 | (Note: On loan from Heart of Midlothian) |
| Scott McMann | Scotland | 2013–2021 | 154 | 1 | |
| David McMillan | Republic of Ireland | 2019 | 8 | 0 | |
| Jordan McMillan | Scotland | 2009 | 4 | 0 | (Note: On loan from Rangers) |
| Lachie McMillan | Scotland | 1920–1924 | 111 | 33 | |
| William McNamee | Scotland | 1912–1920 | 215 | 16 | |
| John McNaught | Scotland | 1982–1986, 1988 | 113 | 21 | |
| Chris McNee | Scotland | 1936–1939 | 100 | 23 | |
| Bob McNeil | Scotland | 1910–1914, 1916–1919 | 187 | 30 | (Note: Second spell on loan from Chelsea) |
| Hugh McNeil | Scotland | 1901–1902 | 18 | 2 | |
| Hugh McNeil, Jr. | Scotland | 1923–1926 | 70 | 0 | |
| John McQuade | Scotland | 1993–1998 | 82 | 3 | |
| Brian McQueen | Scotland | 2010–2011 | 2 | 0 | |
| Jon McShane | Scotland | 2012, 2012–2014 | 45 | 11 | (Note: First spell on loan from St Mirren) |
| Jimmy McStay | Scotland | 1934–1937 | 63 | 0 | |
| Simon Mensing | England | 2007–2008, 2008–2012 | 151 | 25 | (Note: First spell on loan from Motherwell) |
| Kieran Millar | Scotland | 2011–2013 | 3 | 0 | |
| Adam Miller | Scotland | 1910–1916, 1916–1920 | 247 | 0 | |
| Colin Miller | Canada | 1988–1993, 1999–2000 | 207 | 5 | |
| John Miller | Scotland | 1915–1919 | 8 | 4 | |
| Mickel Miller | England | 2018–2020 | 58 | 8 | |
| Tom Miller | Scotland | 1911–1912, 1923–1926 | 127 | 24 | |
| Stuart Mills | Scotland | 2009–2010 | 3 | 0 | |
| Reegan Mimnaugh | Scotland | 2018–2023 | 73 | 0 | |
| Willie Moffat | Scotland | 1922–1931 | 301 | 95 | |
| Johnny Mooney | Scotland | 1948–1953 | 75 | 20 | |
| Jimmy Morgan | Scotland | 1932–1939 | 156 | 0 | |
| Carlton Morris | England | 2015–2016 | 32 | 8 | |
| David Moyes | Scotland | 1993 | 5 | 0 | |
| David Moyo | Zimbabwe | 2019–2022 | 82 | 13 | |
| Ján Mucha | Slovakia | 2018–2019 | 2 | 0 | |
| Josh Mullin | Scotland | 2021–2022 | 33 | 3 | (Note: On loan from Livingston.) |
| Joel Mumbongo | Sweden | 2023–2024 | 8 | 0 | |
| Idris Munir | Nigeria | 2025–2026 | 1 | 0 | |
| Kyle Munro | Scotland | 2020–2022 | 22 | 2 | |
| Sean Murdoch | Scotland | 2007, 2008–2011 | 22 | 0 | (Note: First spell on loan from Dunfermline Athletic) |
| John Murphy | Scotland | 1916–1920 | 89 | 23 | |
| Connor Murray | Scotland | 2023–2025 | 21 | 3 | |
| Christian Nadé | France | 2015–2016 | 17 | 2 | |
| Chris Neeson | Scotland | 2023–2025 | 1 | 0 | |
| Alex Neil | Scotland | 2005–2015 | 211 | 4 | |
| Jonny Ngandu | England | 2022–2023 | 10 | 0 | |
| Sam Nicolson | Scotland | 2022 | 1 | 0 | |
| George Oakley | England | 2019–2020 | 36 | 8 | |
| Josh O'Brien | Republic of Ireland | 2023–2024 | 8 | 0 | |
| Dáire O'Connor | Republic of Ireland | 2024–2025 | 4 | 0 | |
| Hakeem Odoffin | England | 2020–2021 | 37 | 3 | |
| Richard Offiong | England | 2006–2009 | 92 | 38 | |
| Marios Ogkmpoe | Greece | 2018–2021 | 65 | 13 | |
| Kevin O'Hara | Scotland | 2023–2026 | 103 | 25 | |
| Oludare Olufunwa | England | 2024–2025 | 3 | 0 | |
| Ryan One | Scotland | 2022–2023 | 21 | 2 | |
| Daniel O'Reilly | Republic of Ireland | 2022–2023 | 50 | 6 | |
| Tunde Owolabi | Belgium | 2020–2021 | 7 | 0 | |
| Jonathan Page | England | 2012, 2013 | 22 | 3 | |
| Flávio Paixão | Portugal | 2009–2011 | 56 | 10 | |
| Marco Paixão | Portugal | 2009–2011 | 50 | 5 | |
| Willie Paterson | Scotland | 1913–1919 | 132 | 3 | |
| Matt Paterson | Scotland | 2011 | 14 | 2 | (Note: On loan from Southend United) |
| Andy Paton | Scotland | 1958–1960 | 34 | 0 | |
| Alex Penny | Wales | 2018–2019 | 8 | 0 | |
| Mihai Popescu | Romania | 2021–2022 | 31 | 1 | (Note: On loan from Heart of Midlothian.) |
| Brian Potter | Scotland | 2008–2011 | 1 | 0 | |
| Arran Preston | Scotland | 2023–2025 | 1 | 0 | |
| Rocco Quinn | Scotland | 2009 | 2 | 0 | |
| Johnnie Rankin | Scotland | 1922–1924 | 40 | 3 | |
| Marley Redfern | Scotland | 2021–2024 | 40 | 0 | |
| Daniel Redmond | England | 2012, 2014–2018 | 104 | 10 | (Note: First spell on loan from Wigan Athletic) |
| Bobby Reid | Scotland | 1931–1936 | 62 | 19 | |
| Omar Rezgane | France | 2006–2007 | 2 | 0 | |
| Scott Robinson | Scotland | 2025–2026 | 31 | 5 | |
| Antonio Rojano | Argentina | 2017–2018 | 26 | 3 | |
| Ahkeem Rose | Jamaica | 2024 | 14 | 7 | (Note: On loan from Ayr United) |
| Jack Ross | Scotland | 2010 | 2 | 0 | |
| Jon Routledge | England | 2010–2011, 2011, 2012, 2012–2015 | 99 | 5 | (Note: First spell on loan from Wigan Athletic; third spell on loan from Stockport County) |
| Richard Roy | Trinidad and Tobago | 2016–2017 | 1 | 0 | |
| Luis Rubiales | Spain | 2009 | 3 | 0 | |
| Georgios Sarris | Greece | 2016–2018 | 51 | 1 | |
| Jason Scotland | Trinidad and Tobago | 2014–2015, 2015 | 39 | 13 | |
| Charlie Scott | England | 2018 | 2 | 0 | (Note: On loan from Manchester United) |
| Danny Seaborne | England | 2016–2017 | 11 | 0 | |
| Jamie Sendles-White | Northern Ireland | 2015–2016 | 7 | 0 | |
| Oli Shaw | Scotland | 2024–2026 | 68 | 30 | |
| Bobby Shearer | Scotland | 1951–1955 | 73 | 13 | |
| Jim Sherry | Scotland | 1993-1998, 2000-2004 | 186 | 13 | |
| Matthew Shiels | Scotland | 2021–2023 | 35 | 0 | |
| Ewan Simpson | Scotland | 2025–2026 | 19 | 1 | (Note: On loan from Aston Villa) |
| Gavin Skelton | England | 2010–2011 | 16 | 0 | |
| Giannis Skondras | Greece | 2017–2018 | 34 | 4 | |
| Callum Smith | Scotland | 2020–2021 | 24 | 2 | |
| Connor Smith | Scotland | 2023, 2024–2025, 2025–2026 | 59 | 13 | (Note: First spell on loan from Heart of Midlothian, second spell on loan from St Johnstone) |
| Gordon Smith | Scotland | 2011–2012 | 3 | 0 | |
| Jamie Smith | Scotland | 2021–2026 | 38 | 0 | |
| Lewis Smith | Scotland | 2018–2024 | 120 | 12 | |
| Trevor Smith | Scotland | 1989–1990, 1991–1993 | 60 | 23 | (Note: First spell on loan from Dunfermline Athletic) |
| George Sommerville | Scotland | 1921–1926 | 138 | 0 | |
| Sebastian Sorsa | Finland | 2008–2009 | 2 | 0 | |
| Luke Southwood | England | 2019–2020, 2020 | 15 | 0 | (Note: Both spells on loan from Reading) |
| Lennard Sowah | Germany | 2016–2017, 2018–2019 | 25 | 0 | |
| Tom Sparrow | Wales | 2023 | 12 | 0 | (Note: On loan from Stoke City) |
| Lewis Spence | Scotland | 2021–2023 | 23 | 1 | |
| George Stanger | New Zealand | 2018–2021 | 8 | 0 | |
| John Steel | Scotland | 1921–1925 | 127 | 10 | |
| Greig Spence | Scotland | 2011–2012 | 29 | 5 | |
| Dylan Stephenson | England | 2023 | 9 | 1 | |
| Tony Stevenson | Scotland | 2005–2010 | 44 | 8 | |
| Mark Stewart | Scotland | 2012 | 13 | 1 | (Note: On loan from Bradford City) |
| Ben Stirling | Scotland | 2020–2022 | 24 | 0 | |
| Cole Stirling | Scotland | 2025–2026 | 1 | 0 | |
| Mikey Stone | England | 2025 | 3 | 0 | |
| Sam Stubbs | England | 2019–2020 | 19 | 0 | (Note: On loan from Middlesbrough) |
| John Sullivan | Republic of Ireland | 2009–2010 | 2 | 0 | |
| Nicolas Šumský | Czech Republic | 2015–2016 | 1 | 0 | |
| Chris Swailes | England | 2007–2009 | 52 | 1 | |
| Dylan Tait | Scotland | 2023–2024 | 17 | 1 | (Note: On loan from Hibernian) |
| Tom Taiwo | England | 2018–2019 | 16 | 0 | |
| Stuart Taylor | Scotland | 2007–2010 | 16 | 4 | |
| Charlie Telfer | Scotland | 2025 | 9 | 0 | |
| David Templeton | Scotland | 2017–2018, 2020–2021 | 47 | 12 | |
| Joël Thomas | France | 2008–2009, 2010, 2010 | 40 | 3 | (Note: Second spell on loan from Colchester United) |
| Nathan Thomas | England | 2020–2021 | 10 | 0 | |
| John Thomson | Scotland | 1932–1939 | 167 | 5 | |
| Regan Thomson | Scotland | 2022 | 1 | 0 | |
| Robbie Thomson | Scotland | 2016–2017 | 1 | 0 | |
| Jean-Pierre Tiéhi | France | 2022– | 32 | 3 | (Note: On loan from Fulham) |
| Ryan Tierney | Scotland | 2016–2018 | 2 | 0 | |
| Nikolay Todorov | Bulgaria | 2024–2025 | 32 | 1 | |
| Xavier Tomas | France | 2017–2018 | 36 | 1 | |
| Charlie Trafford | Canada | 2020–2021 | 16 | 0 | |
| Delphin Tshiembe | DR Congo | 2018–2019 | 19 | 0 | |
| Reghan Tumilty | Scotland | 2023–2025 | 77 | 8 | |
| Chris Turner | Northern Ireland | 2015 | 3 | 0 | |
| Kenny van der Weg | Netherlands | 2018 | 11 | 0 | |
| David van Zanten | Republic of Ireland | 2010 | 6 | 0 | |
| Miko Virtanen | Finland | 2021–2023 | 20 | 0 | |
| Bobby Wallace | Scotland | 1934–1939 | 172 | 1 | |
| Shaun Want | Scotland | 2016–2022 | 55 | 2 | |
| Craig Watson | Scotland | 2012–2017 | 11 | 0 | |
| Philip Watson | Scotland | 1907–1912 | 120 | 4 | |
| Phil Watson | Scotland | 1927–1932 | 173 | 6 | |
| John Waugh | Scotland | 1914–1916 | 110 | 21 | |
| James Welford | England | 1901–1907 | 46 | 1 | |
| Kevin Welsh | Scotland | 2009–2010 | 1 | 0 | |
| James Wesolowski | Australia | 2009–2010 | 29 | 4 | (Note: On loan from Leicester City) |
| Aaron Wildig | England | 2011 | 3 | 0 | (Note: On loan from Cardiff City) |
| Ben Williamson | Scotland | 2024–2026 | 25 | 1 | |
| Kyle Wilkie | Scotland | 2009–2012 | 19 | 0 | |
| David Wilson | England | 1928–1945 | 349 | 245 | |
| Frank Wilson | Scotland | 1928–1933 | 150 | 14 | |
| Jock Wilson | England | 1928–1931 | 91 | 7 | |
| Andrew Winter | Scotland | 2019–2024 | 91 | 8 | |
| Gary Woods | England | 2016–2019 | 85 | 0 | |
| Sam Woods | England | 2020 | 3 | 1 | (Note: On loan from Crystal Palace) |
| Dario Zanatta | Canada | 2022–2024 | 36 | 1 | |

== Sources ==
- List of Hamilton Academical F.C. players at Post War English & Scottish Football League A–Z Player's Transfer Database
- Soccerbase
- Hamilton Academical Memory Bank
