= Daniel Kelly =

Daniel, Dan or Danny Kelly may refer to:

== Academics ==
- Daniel Kelly (sociologist) (born 1959), British sociologist and nursing professor
- Daniel Kelly (philosopher) (born 1975), American philosopher
- Daniel P. Kelly (born 1955), American physician and professor of diabetes and metabolic diseases

== Entertainment ==
- Dan Kelly (musician) (born 1974), Australian musician
- Dan Kelly (recording artist) (1842–?), American pioneer recording artist
- Daniel Hugh Kelly (born 1952), American stage, film, and television actor
- Daniel Kelly (artist) (born 1947), American artist based in Japan
- Daniel Kelly (actor) (born 1992), Canadian actor and rapper
- Danny Kelly (BBC WM presenter) (born 1970), British radio presenter
- Danny Kelly (journalist) (1956–2026), British music journalist

== Sports ==
- Dan Kelly (fighter) (born 1977), Australian Olympic judoka and mixed martial artist
- Dan Kelly (footballer) (1904–1941), Scottish footballer
- Dan Kelly (ice hockey) (born 1989), American ice hockey defenceman
- Dan Kelly (sportscaster) (1936–1989), broadcaster best known for National Hockey League coverage
- Dan Kelly (rugby union) (born 2001), English-Irish rugby union player
- Dan P. Kelly (born 1973), National Hockey League broadcaster and son of sportscaster Dan Kelly
- Daniel Kelly (athlete) (1883–1920), American long jumper
- Daniel Kelly (footballer, born 1893) (1893–1948), Scottish footballer (Hamilton Academical)
- Daniel Kelly (footballer, born 1996), Irish footballer
- Daniel Kelly (footballer, born 2005), Scottish footballer
- Daniel Kelly (handballer) in Australia men's national handball team
- Danny Kelly (boxer), see Colombia at the 2011 Pan American Games
- Danny Kelly (footballer, born 1990), English footballer
- Danny Kelly (soccer) (born 1969), American soccer player and coach

== Others ==
- Dan Kelly (bushranger) (1861–1880), Australian bushranger and outlaw
- Dan Kelly (poker player) (born 1989), poker player
- Daniel Kelly (Medal of Honor) (1841–1912), American Civil War soldier
- Daniel Kelly (Wisconsin judge) (born 1964), Wisconsin Supreme Court Justice
- Daniel M. Kelly (1915–1982), member of the New York State Assembly
- Dan Kelly (politician) (born 1950), American politician from Kentucky

== See also ==
- Daniel Kelley (disambiguation)
