= 2018–19 Hamilton Academical F.C. season =

Hamilton Academical
2018–19 season
- Chairman: Ronnie MacDonald (until 18 December); Allan Maitland
- Manager: Martin Canning (until 29 January); Brian Rice (from 31 January)
- Stadium: New Douglas Park
- Scottish Premiership: 10th
- Scottish Cup: Fourth round
- League Cup: Group stage
- Top goalscorer: League: Mickel Miller (5); All: Mickel Miller (8)
- Highest home attendance: 5,827 vs. Rangers, Premiership, 24 February 2019
- Lowest home attendance: 1,012 vs. Livingston, League Cup, 17 July 2018
- Average home league attendance: 2,829
Home colours	Away colours	Third colours

The 2018–19 season was Hamilton's fifth consecutive season in the top flight of Scottish football since their promotion at the end of the 2013–14 season. Hamilton also competed in the League Cup and the Scottish Cup.

== Summary ==
=== Season ===
Hamilton finished in tenth place in the Scottish Premiership for the second consecutive season and once again avoided dropping into the relegation play-off place on the final day of the season with their victory over St Johnstone. Hamilton were also eliminated in the group stage of the league cup and the fourth round of the Scottish Cup.

=== Management ===
Hamilton began the season under the management of Martin Canning who had been at the club as a player since 2008 and player-manager since 2015. On 29 January 2019, Canning departed the club by mutual consent. Two days later on 31 January, former St Mirren assistant Brian Rice was appointed as the club's new head coach.

== Results and fixtures ==
Win Draw Loss Postponed

=== Scottish Premiership ===
4 August 2018 1	Hamilton Academical	1–4	Heart of Midlothian	Hamilton
15:00	Miller 17'; McMann (yellow card) 42'; Penny (yellow card) 60'	BBC Report	Haring 20', 58'; Naismith 49' (pen.), (yellow card) 68'; MacLean (yellow card) 60', (goal) 62'	Stadium: New Douglas Park; Attendance: 3,764; Referee: Andrew Dallas

11 August 2018 2	Motherwell	0–1	Hamilton Academical	Motherwell
15:00 BST (UTC+1)	Sammon (yellow card) 24'; Hartley (yellow card) 66'	Report	Want (yellow card) 49'; Boyd 67'; MacKinnon (yellow card) 85'; Woods (yellow card) 86'	Stadium: Fir Park; Attendance: 4,807; Referee: Nick Walsh

26 August 2018 3	Celtic	1–0	Hamilton Academical	Glasgow
	Boyata 63'	BBC Sport; Celtic Report		Stadium: Celtic Park; Attendance: 56,044; Referee: Don Robertson

1 September 2018 4	Hamilton Academical	1–2	St Johnstone	Hamilton
	Bingham (yellow card) 29', (goal) 69'; McMann (yellow card) 36'	Report	Alston 37'; McMillan 45+1'; Clark (yellow card) 90'	Stadium: New Douglas Park; Attendance: 1,791; Referee: Bobby Madden

15 September 2018 5	Livingston	1–0	Hamilton Academical	Livingston
15:00	Lawless 3'; Gallagher (yellow card) 47'; Halkett (yellow card) 57'	BBC Report	Bingham (yellow card) 35'; MacKinnon (yellow card) 66'	Stadium: Almondvale Stadium; Attendance: 1,342; Referee: Alan Muir

22 September 2018 6	Hamilton Academical	3–0	St Mirren	Hamilton
	MacKinnon (yellow card) 26'; Brustad 36'; Miller 40' (pen.), 66'; Taiwo (yellow card) 54'	Report	Edwards (yellow card) 34'; Flynn (yellow card) 70'; P. McGinn (yellow card) 77'	Stadium: New Douglas Park; Attendance: 2,830; Referee: Greg Aitken

29 September 2018 7	Hamilton Academical	0–2	Dundee	Hamilton
15:00	Boyd (yellow card) 41'; Brustad (yellow card) 77'	Report	Boyle 38', (yellow card) 61'; Madianga 90+3'; Inniss (yellow card) 77'; Ngwatala (yellow card) 73'	Stadium: New Douglas Park; Attendance: 1,788; Referee: Willie Collum

6 October 2018 8	Hibernian	6–0	Hamilton Academical	Edinburgh
	Boyle 25'; Mallan 34', 71'; Hyndman 39'; Kamberi 90+1'; Kilgallon 90+2' (o.g.)	Report		Stadium: Easter Road; Attendance: 16,857; Referee: Don Robertson

21 October 2018 9	Hamilton Academical	1–4	Rangers	Hamilton
13:30	Boyd 80'	Report	Kent 41'; Tavernier 84' (pen.), 87' (pen.); Morelos 90+4'	Stadium: New Douglas Park; Attendance: 5,013; Referee: Andrew Dallas

27 October 2018 10	Kilmarnock	1–1	Hamilton Academical	Edinburgh
	McKenzie 44'; Tshibola (yellow card) 59'; Byrne (yellow card) 81'	Report	Imrie 34', (yellow card) 36'; MacKinnon (yellow card) 43'; Martin (yellow card) 63'; Boyd (yellow card) 87' (red card) 90+2'	Stadium: Easter Road; Attendance: 5,023; Referee: Euan Anderson

31 October 2018 11	Aberdeen	3–0	Hamilton Academical	Aberdeen
19:45 GMT	Shinnie 8'; Wilson 23'; Devlin 60'	Report	Kilgallon (yellow card) 22'; McGowan (yellow card) 27'; Imrie (yellow card) 78' (yellow-red card) 90+2'	Stadium: Pittodrie Stadium; Attendance: 12,365; Referee: Greg Aitken

3 November 2018 12	Hamilton Academical	1–0	Livingston	Hamilton
15:00 GMT	Taiwo (yellow card) 22'; Gordon (yellow card) 28'; Miller (yellow card) 61' (yellow-red card) 85'; Tshiembe (yellow card) 70'; Bloomfield 86'	Report	Lithgow (yellow card) 73'; Menga (yellow card) 88'	Stadium: New Douglas Park; Attendance: 1,459; Referee: Alan Muir

10 November 2018 13	St Johnstone	4–0	Hamilton Academical	Perth
	Davidson 20'; Wright 36'; Kennedy 54', (yellow card) 62'; Wotherspoon 74'	Report	Imrie (yellow card) 20'; McGowan (yellow card) 39'; Martin (yellow card) 51'; MacKinnon (yellow card) 76'	Stadium: McDiarmid Park; Attendance: 2,175; Referee: Steven McLean

24 November 2018 14	Hamilton Academical	0–3	Celtic	Hamilton
	McMann (yellow card) 57'; Martin (yellow card) 81'; Taiwo (yellow card) 87'	Report	Christie 13'; Martin 68' (o.g.); Griffiths 82'	Stadium: New Douglas Park; Attendance: 4,688; Referee: Don Robertson

1 December 2018 15	St Mirren	1–3	Hamilton Academical	Paisley
	S McGinn (yellow card) 6', (goal) 45'; Jackson (yellow card) 46' (yellow-red card) 68'	Report	Imrie 21'; Martin (yellow card) 30'; Gordon 42', (yellow card) 52'; Keatings 55'; McGowan (yellow card) 61'	Stadium: St Mirren Park; Attendance: 4,334; Referee: Kevin Clancy

5 December 2018 16	Dundee	4–0	Hamilton Academical	Dundee
19:45 GMT	K. Miller 27', 51', 81'; Curran 69'	Report		Stadium: Dens Park; Attendance: 4,426; Referee: John Beaton

8 December 2018 17	Hamilton Academical	0–1	Hibernian	Hamilton
15:00 GMT	Keatings (yellow card) 7'; Gordon (yellow card) 74'	Report	Slivka (yellow card) 42'; Shaw 65'	Stadium: New Douglas Park; Attendance: 2,169; Referee: Bobby Madden

16 December 2018 18	Rangers	1–0	Hamilton Academical	Glasgow
15:00 GMT	Candeias 3'; Lafferty (yellow card) 90+2'	Report	Gordon (yellow card) 39'; Taiwo (yellow card) 67'	Stadium: Ibrox Stadium; Attendance: 49,055; Referee: Euan Anderson

22 December 2018 19	Hamilton Academical	1–1	Kilmarnock	Hamilton
	Miller 37' (pen.), (yellow card) 56'; Imrie (yellow card) 45+1'; McGowan (yellow card) 81'	Report	Brophy 7'	Stadium: New Douglas Park; Attendance: 3,401; Referee: Bobby Madden

26 December 2018 20	Heart of Midlothian	2–0	Hamilton Academical	Edinburgh
15:00 GMT	Naismith 18'; Djoum 44'	BBC Report	Want (yellow card) 56' (yellow-red card) 71'	Stadium: Tynecastle Park; Attendance: 16,475; Referee: Don Robertson

29 December 2018 21	Hamilton Academical	1–2	Motherwell	Hamilton
	Imrie 17'; McGowan (yellow card) 61'	Report	Aldred 21', 77'; Frear (yellow card) 40'; Turnbull (yellow card) 52'; Campbell (yellow card) 90+1'	Stadium: New Douglas Park; Attendance: 3,843; Referee: Nick Walsh

23 January 2019 22	Hamilton Academical	0–3	Aberdeen	Hamilton
19:45 GMT	McGowan (yellow card) 16'; Gordon (yellow card) 28'; Martin (yellow card) 82'	Report	Cosgrove 25', 52'; Logan (yellow card) 51'; Ferguson 56' (yellow card) 78'	Stadium: New Douglas Park; Attendance: 2,104; Referee: Greg Aitken

26 January 2019 23	Celtic	3–0	Hamilton Academical	Glasgow
	McGregor 40'; Christie 77'; Sinclair 87'	BBC Sport; Celtic Report		Stadium: Celtic Park; Attendance: 58,264; Referee: Alan Muir

2 February 2019 24	Hamilton Academical	1–1	Dundee	Hamilton
15:00 GMT	MacKinnon 90+1'	Report	Wright 66'	Stadium: New Douglas Park; Attendance: 2,297; Referee: Euan Anderson

6 February 2019 25	Hamilton Academical	2–1	St Johnstone	Hamilton
19:45 GMT	Gogić (yellow card) 64'; Oakley 68', 79'; Andreu (yellow card) 84'	Report	Shaughnessy (yellow card) 61'; Craig 76'	Stadium: New Douglas Park; Attendance: 1,174; Referee: Gavin Duncan

16 February 2019 26	Hibernian	2–0	Hamilton Academical	Edinburgh
15:00 GMT	Kamberi 17'; McNulty 39' (pen.), (yellow card) 51'; McGregor (yellow card) 63'; Mallan (yellow card) 67'	BBC Sport	Oakley (yellow card) 62'; Sowah (yellow card) 74'	Stadium: Easter Road; Attendance: 16,265; Referee: Alan Muir

24 February 2019 27	Hamilton Academical	0–5	Rangers	Hamilton
12:15	Andreu (yellow card) 69'	Rangers Report; BBC Report; SPFL Report	Jack 16'; Defoe 17'; Arfield 24'; Tavernier 44' (pen.); Lafferty 88'	Stadium: New Douglas Park; Attendance: 5,827; Referee: Nick Walsh

27 February 2019 28	Aberdeen	0–2	Hamilton Academical	Aberdeen
19:45 GMT	Considine (yellow card) 14'	Report	Oakley 34'; Miller 59', (yellow card) 90+4'; McGowan (yellow card) 63'	Stadium: Pittodrie Stadium; Attendance: 12,468; Referee: Bobby Madden

9 March 2019 29	Motherwell	3–0	Hamilton Academical	Motherwell
15:00 GMT (UTC)	Turnbull 3', 11' (pen.); Hastie 37'; Rodriguez (yellow card) 54'; Johnson (yellow card) 90'	Report	Gogić (yellow card) 38'; Keatings (yellow card) 56'; Sowah (yellow card) 61'; Kilgallon (yellow card) 90'	Stadium: Fir Park; Attendance: 5,248; Referee: Andrew Dallas

16 March 2019 30	Hamilton Academical	1–0	Heart of Midlothian	Hamilton
15:00	McGowan 36'	Report		Stadium: New Douglas Park; Attendance: 2,082; Referee: Willie Collum

30 March 2019 31	Kilmarnock	5–0	Hamilton Academical	Kilmarnock
15:00	Taylor 5'; McAleny 56'; Mulumbu 63'; Burke 84'; Ndjoli 92'	Report		Stadium: Rugby Park; Attendance: 4,762; Referee: Andrew Dallas

3 April 2019 32	Livingston	2–0	Hamilton Academical	Almondvale Stadium
19:45	Robinson (yellow card) 13'; Lithgow (yellow card) 33'; Hardie 46'; Halkett 79'	Report	Andreu (yellow card) 62'; Miller (yellow card) 66'	Attendance: 1,022; Referee: Alan Muir

6 April 2019 33	Hamilton Academical	1–1	St Mirren	Hamilton
15:00	Miller (yellow card) 54'; Davies 63'	Report	Dreyer 66' (pen.)	Stadium: New Douglas Park; Attendance: 3,096; Referee: John Beaton

20 April 2019 34	Hamilton Academical	1–1	Motherwell	Hamilton
15:00 BST (UTC+1)	MacKinnon (yellow card) 56'; Martin (yellow card) 71'; McGowan (yellow card) 80'; Ogkmpoe 84'	Report	Turnbull 30'; Campbell (yellow card) 82'	Stadium: New Douglas Park; Attendance: 2,746; Referee: Don Robertson

27 April 2019 35	Hamilton Academical	3–3	Livingston	Hamilton
15:00 BST (UTC+1)	Oakley 40'; Imrie 47' (pen.), (yellow card) 62'; Smith (yellow card) 86'; McGowan 90'	Report	Kelly (yellow card) 47'; Pittman 57', 71'; Lawson 67'	Stadium: New Douglas Park; Attendance: 1,135; Referee: Greg Aitken

4 May 2019 36	Dundee	0–1	Hamilton Academical	Dundee
15:00		Report	Mimnaugh (yellow card) 32'; Andreu 83' (pen.)	Stadium: Dens Park; Attendance: 4,622; Referee: Nick Walsh

13 May 2019 37	St Mirren	2–0	Hamilton Academical	Paisley
19:45	P. McGinn (yellow card) 20'; Mužek (yellow card) 56'; McAllister 75'; Magennis 90+6'	Report	McGowan (yellow card) 19'; Gogić (red card) 29'	Stadium: St Mirren Park; Attendance: 6,421; Referee: Willie Collum

18 May 2019 38	Hamilton Academical	2–0	St Johnstone	Hamilton
12:30	Gordon 11'; Davies 57'; McMann (yellow card) 72'; Martin (yellow card) 77'; MacKinnon (yellow card) 88'	Report	Craig (yellow card) 6'	Stadium: New Douglas Park; Attendance: 2,553; Referee: Steven McLean

=== Scottish League Cup ===
14 July 2018 Group Stage	Annan Athletic	1–0	Hamilton Academical	Annan
	Smith 60'	Report		Stadium: Galabank; Attendance: 491

17 July 2018 Group Stage	Hamilton Academical	0–0 (5–6 p)	Livingston	Hamilton
		Report		Stadium: New Douglas Park; Attendance: 1,012; Referee: John Beaton

24 July 2018 Group Stage	Berwick Rangers	0–4	Hamilton Academical	Berwick-upon-Tweed
		Report	Miller 5', 29', 64' (pen.); Imrie 87'	Stadium: Shielfield Park; Attendance: 336

28 July 2018 Group Stage	Hamilton Academical	1–1 (3–0 p)	Airdrieonians	Hamilton
	Bingham 62'	Report	Victoria 83'	Stadium: New Douglas Park; Attendance: 1,316; Referee: Craig Thomson

=== Scottish Cup ===
19 January 2019 Fourth Round	St Johnstone	2–0	Hamilton Academical	Perth
15:00	Kerr 1'; Watt 26'	Report		Stadium: McDiarmid Park; Attendance: 2,363; Referee: John Beaton

=== UEFA Youth League ===
3 October 2018 First round 1st Leg	(Switzerland) Basel	2–2	Hamilton Academical	Basel
16:00	von Moos 13'; Marchand 50'	Report	Douglas 7', 76'	Stadium: Leichtathletik Stadion St. Jakob; Attendance: 332; Referee: Laurent Kopriwa

24 October 2018 First round 2nd Leg	Hamilton Academical	2–2 (4–4 agg.) (3–2 p)	(Switzerland) Basel	Hamilton
19:00	Winter 19'; Slaven 90+5'	Report	Tushi 35'; Gaudiano 85'	Stadium: New Douglas Park; Attendance: 2,460; Referee: Rohit Saggi

7 November 2018 Second round 1st Leg	(Denmark) FC Midtjylland	2–0	Hamilton Academical	Herning
18:30	Tengstedt 14', 28'	Report		Stadium: MCH Arena; Attendance: 712; Referee: Paul Mclaughlin

28 November 2018 Second round 2nd Leg	Hamilton Academical	1–2 (1–4 agg.)	(Denmark) FC Midtjylland	Hamilton
19:00	Winter 10'	Report	Tengstedt 66' (pen.); Hansen 90'	Stadium: New Douglas Park; Attendance: 2,498; Referee: Bryn Markham-Jones

== Squad statistics ==
=== Appearances ===
As of 18 May 2019

No.	Pos	Nat	Player	Total		Premiership		League Cup		Scottish Cup	
No.	Pos	Nat	Player	Apps	Goals	Apps	Goals	Apps	Goals	Apps	Goals
1	GK	(England) ENG	Gary Woods	35	0	32	0	3	0	0	0
2	DF	(England) ENG	Aaron McGowan	38	2	35	2	2	0	1	0
3	DF	(Scotland) SCO	Scott McMann	33	0	27+1	0	4	0	1	0
4	DF	(Scotland) SCO	Ziggy Gordon	41	2	35+1	2	4	0	1	0
5	DF	(Democratic Republic of the Congo) COD	Delphin Tshiembe	19	0	15+4	0	0	0	0	0
6	DF	(England) ENG	Matt Kilgallon	26	0	25	0	0	0	1	0
7	MF	(Scotland) SCO	Dougie Imrie	34	4	22+7	4	4	0	1	0
8	FW	(England) ENG	Steve Davies	10	2	5+4	2	0	0	1	0
9	FW	(England) ENG	George Oakley	15	4	14+1	4	0	0	0	0
10	FW	(Scotland) SCO	James Keatings	17	1	8+9	1	0	0	0	0
11	FW	(England) ENG	Mikel Miller	36	8	25+6	5	4	3	1	0
12	MF	(England) ENG	Tom Taiwo	19	0	12+4	0	2	0	0+1	0
13	DF	(Cyprus) CYP	Alex Gogić	17	0	12+4	0	0	0	1	0
14	FW	(Scotland) SCO	Ross Cunningham	5	0	0+3	0	0+2	0	0	0
15	MF	(Scotland) SCO	Ronan Hughes	0	0	0	0	0	0	0	0
16	FW	(Republic of Ireland) IRL	David McMillan	8	0	4+4	0	0	0	0	0
17	DF	(England) ENG	Alex Penny	11	0	3+5	0	0	0	2+1	0
18	MF	(Scotland) SCO	Darian MacKinnon	33	1	29	1	0	0	4	0
19	GK	(England) ENG	Jacob Marsden	1	0	0+1	0	0	0	0	0
21	DF	(Scotland) SCO	Shaun Want	12	0	9+1	0	0	0	2	0
22	MF	(France) FRA	Tony Andreu	18	1	15+2	1	0	0	1	0
23	GK	(Scotland) SCO	Ryan Fulton	6	0	4	0	1	0	1	0
24	GK	(Slovakia) SVK	Ján Mucha	2	0	2	0	0	0	0	0
26	MF	(England) ENG	Sam Kelly	9	0	3+3	0	1+2	0	0	0
27	DF	(New Zealand) NZL	George Stanger	0	0	0	0	0	0	0	0
28	MF	(Scotland) SCO	Lewis Smith	4	0	0+4	0	0	0	0	0
29	MF	(Scotland) SCO	Jack Breen	0	0	0	0	0	0	0	0
30	FW	(Scotland) SCO	Steven Boyd	26	2	10+13	2	2	0	0+1	0
31	FW	(Norway) NOR	Fredrik Brustad	15	1	11+4	1	0	0	0	0
33	MF	(Scotland) SCO	Reegan Mimnaugh	8	0	5+3	0	0	0	0	0
46	DF	(Germany) GER	Lennard Sowah	21	0	14+4	0	1	0	2	0
99	FW	(Greece) GRE	Marios Ogkmpoe	6	1	3+3	1	0	0	0	0
Players who left the club during the 2018–19 season
6	DF	(England) ENG	Adam Phillips	2	0	0	0	0	0	2	0
8	MF	(England) ENG	Aaron Smith	1	0	0	0	0	0	0+1	0
9	FW	(England) ENG	Rakish Bingham	23	3	11+8	1	3+1	2	0	0
16	FW	(England) ENG	Mason Bloomfield	7	1	1+4	1	2	0	0	0
22	DF	(Scotland) SCO	Darren Lyon	4	0	1	0	0	0	0+3	0
22	MF	(Saint Lucia) LCA	Kieran Monlouis	0	0	0	0	0	0	0	0
24	MF	(Scotland) SCO	Scott Martin	31	0	26+5	0	0	0	0	0

== Team statistics ==
=== League table ===
Pos	Team	Pld	W	D	L	GF	GA	GD	Pts	Qualification or relegation (Note: Teams play each other three times (33 matches), before the league is split into two groups (the top six and the bottom six).)
8	Motherwell	38	15	6	17	46	56	−10	51	
9	Livingston	38	11	11	16	42	44	−2	44	
10	Hamilton Academical	38	9	6	23	28	75	−47	33	
11	St Mirren (O)	38	8	8	22	34	66	−32	32	Qualification for the Premiership play-off final
12	Dundee (R)	38	5	6	27	31	78	−47	21	Relegation to the Championship

Source: Soccerway BBC
Rules for classification: 1) Points; 2) Goal difference; 3) Goals scored; 4) Play-off (only if deciding champion, UEFA competitions qualification and second stage group allocation).
(O) Play-off winners; (R) Relegated

=== Division summary ===
Round	1	2	3	4	5	6	7	8	9	10	11	12	13	14	15	16	17	18	19	20	21	22	23	24	25	26	27	28	29	30	31	32	33	34	35	36	37	38
Ground	H	A	A	H	A	H	H	A	H	A	A	H	A	H	A	A	H	A	H	A	H	H	A	H	H	A	H	A	A	H	A	A	H	H	H	A	A	H
Result	L	W	L	L	L	W	L	L	L	D	L	W	L	L	W	L	L	L	D	L	L	L	L	D	W	L	L	W	L	W	L	L	D	D	D	W	L	W
Position	12	7	9	10	11	9	9	9	9	9	10	10	10	10	10	10	10	10	10	10	10	10	10	10	10	11	11	10	10	10	10	10	10	10	10	10	10	10

Updated to match(es) played on 18 May 2019. Source:
A = Away; H = Home; W = Win; D = Draw; L = Loss

=== League Cup table ===
Pos	Team	Pld	W	PW	PL	L	GF	GA	GD	Pts	Qualification	LIV	AIR	HAM	ANN	BER
1	Livingston (Q)	4	3	1	0	0	5	1	+4	11	Qualification for the Second round	—	—	—	1–0	2–0
2	Airdrieonians	4	2	0	1	1	9	4	+5	7		1–2	—	—	4–1	—
3	Hamilton Academical	4	1	1	1	1	5	2	+3	6		0–0p	p1–1	—	—	—
4	Annan Athletic	4	2	0	0	2	6	5	+1	6		—	—	1–0	—	4–0
5	Berwick Rangers	4	0	0	0	4	0	10	−10	0		—	0–3	0–4	—	—

Rules for classification: 1) goal difference, 2) goals scored, 3) away goals scored, 4) matches won, 5) away matches won, 6) drawing of lots.
(Q) Qualified to the phase indicated

== Transfers ==
=== Players in ===
Player	From	Fee
(England) Alex Penny	(England) Peterborough United	Undisclosed
(Scotland) Ziggy Gordon	(Poland) Pogoń Siedlce	Free
(England) Tom Taiwo	(Scotland) Falkirk	Free
(England) Aaron Smith	(England) Nottingham Forest	Free
(England) Sam Kelly	(England) Grimsby Town	Free
(England) Aaron McGowan	(England) Morecambe	Free
(Germany) Lennard Sowah	(Poland) Cracovia	Free
(Democratic Republic of the Congo) Delphin Tshiembe	(Denmark) Horsens	Free
(England) Jacob Marsden	(England) Mildenhall Town	Free
(Saint Lucia) Kieran Monlouis	(England) St Albans City	Free
(Scotland) Scott Martin	(Scotland) Hibernian	Free
(Scotland) James Keatings	(Scotland) Dundee United	Undisclosed
(England) Matt Kilgallon	(England) Bradford City	Free
(Slovakia) Ján Mucha	(Poland) Bruk-Bet Termalica Nieciecza	Free
(England) Steve Davies	(England) Blackpool	Free
(England) George Oakley	(Scotland) Inverness CT	Undisclosed

=== Players out ===
Player	To	Fee
(Scotland) Darren Jamieson	(Scotland) Arbroath	Free
(England) Daniel Redmond	(Wales) The New Saints	Free
(Greece) Georgios Sarris	(Greece) Petrolul Ploiești	Free
(France) Xavier Tomas	(France) Red Star	Free
(Scotland) Lewis Ferguson	(Scotland) Aberdeen	Compensation
(Netherlands) Kenny van der Weg	(Norway) Aalesunds	Free
(Scotland) David Templeton	(England) Burton Albion	Free
(Scotland) Ali Crawford	(England) Doncaster Rovers	Free
(Scotland) Darren Lyon	(England) Peterborough United	Free
(England) Ross Jenkins	Free agent	Free
(England) Sam Kelly	(England) Braintree Town	Free
(England) Rakish Bingham	(England) Cheltenham Town	Free

=== Loans in ===
Player	From	Fee
(England) Mason Bloomfield	(England) Norwich City	Loan
(England) Adam Phillips	(England) Norwich City	Loan
(Norway) Fredrik Brustad	(Norway) Molde FK	Loan
(France) Tony Andreu	(England) Coventry City	Loan
(Republic of Ireland) David McMillan	(Scotland) St Johnstone	Loan

=== Loans out ===
Player	To	Fee
(Scotland) Ross Cunningham	(Scotland) Forfar Athletic	Loan
(Scotland) Jack Breen	(Scotland) Edinburgh City	Loan
