= 1910–11 Heart of Midlothian F.C. season =

Heart of Midlothian
1910–11 season
- Manager: John McCartney
- Stadium: Tynecastle Park
- Scottish First Division: 14th
- Scottish Cup: 1st Round

During the 1910–11 season Hearts competed in the Scottish First Division, the Scottish Cup and the East of Scotland Shield.

== Fixtures ==
=== Dunedin Cup ===
15 August 1910 Dunedin Cup R1	Hearts	4–1	Raith Rovers	Tynecastle Park

24 August 1910 Dunedin Cup SF	Hibernian	2–3	Hearts	Easter Road

29 August 1910 Dunedin Cup Final	Hearts	5–1	Falkirk	Tynecastle Park

=== North Eastern Cup ===
10 September 1910 North Eastern Cup 1st Round	Raith Rovers	4–3	Hearts	Stark's Park

24 April 1911 North Eastern Cup SF	Hearts	1–3	Falkirk	Tynecastle Park

=== East of Scotland Cup ===
15 April 1912 East of Scotland Cup SF	Hearts	7–0	St Bernard's	Tynecastle Park

22 April 1911 East of Scotland Cup Final	Hearts	4–1	Broxburn	Tynecastle Park

=== Rosebery Charity Cup ===
6 May 1911 Rosebery Charity Cup SF	Hearts	1–2	Hibernian	Tynecastle Park

=== Scottish Cup ===
28 January 1911 Scottish Cup R1	Hearts	1–1	Clyde	Tynecastle Park
				Attendance: 26,000

4 February 1911 Scottish Cup R1 Replay	Clyde	1–0	Hearts	Shawfield Stadium
				Attendance: 25,000

=== Scottish First Division ===
20 August 1910 Scottish First Division	Clyde	4–0	Hearts	Shawfield Stadium
				Attendance: 12,000

27 August 1910 Scottish First Division	Hearts	4–1	Queen's Park	Tynecastle Park
				Attendance: 10,000

3 September 1910 Scottish First Division	Motherwell	3–2	Hearts	Fir Park
				Attendance: 8,000

17 September 1910 Scottish First Division	Kilmarnock	1–2	Hearts	Rugby Park
				Attendance: 7,500

19 September 1910 Scottish First Division	Hearts	1–4	Rangers	Tynecastle Park
				Attendance: 11,500

24 September 1910 Scottish First Division	Hearts	2–0	Morton	Tynecastle Park
				Attendance: 8,000

26 September 1910 Scottish First Division	Third Lanark	1–0	Hearts	Cathkin Park
				Attendance: 8,000

1 October 1910 Scottish First Division	Partick Thistle	2–1	Hearts	Firhill Park
				Attendance: 12,000

8 October 1910 Scottish First Division	Hearts	0–0	Raith Rovers	Tynecastle Park
				Attendance: 9,000

15 October 1910 Scottish First Division	Celtic	0–0	Hearts	Celtic Park
				Attendance: 9,000

22 October 1910 Scottish First Division	Hearts	2–0	Hibernian	Tynecastle Park
				Attendance: 13,500

29 October 1910 Scottish First Division	Hearts	2–3	Dundee	Tynecastle Park
				Attendance: 11,000

5 November 1910 Scottish First Division	Aberdeen	3–2	Hearts	Pittodrie Park
				Attendance: 8,000

12 November 1910 Scottish First Division	Hamilton Academical	1–2	Hearts	Douglas Park
				Attendance: 3,000

19 November 1910 Scottish First Division	Hearts	2–2	Airdrieonians	Tynecastle Park
				Attendance: 6,500

26 November 1910 Scottish First Division	St Mirren	3–0	Hearts	St Mirren Park, Love Street
				Attendance: 6,000

3 December 1910 Scottish First Division	Hearts	1–1	Clyde	Tynecastle Park
				Attendance: 7,500

10 December 1910 Scottish First Division	Dundee	4–1	Hearts	Dens Park
				Attendance: 8,000

17 December 1910 Scottish First Division	Hearts	0–3	Aberdeen	Tynecastle Park
				Attendance: 9,000

24 December 1910 Scottish First Division	Rangers	2–0	Hearts	Ibrox Park
				Attendance: 9,000

31 December 1910 Scottish First Division	Hearts	0–1	Third Lanark	Tynecastle Park
				Attendance: 8,500

2 January 1911 Scottish First Division	Hibernian	1–0	Hearts	Easter Road
				Attendance: 12,000

7 January 1911 Scottish First Division	Hearts	1–0	Motherwell	Tynecastle Park
				Attendance: 6,000

14 January 1911 Scottish First Division	Hearts	3–1	Partick Thistle	Tynecastle Park
				Attendance: 10,000

21 January 1911 Scottish First Division	Hearts	0–0	St Mirren	Tynecastle Park
				Attendance: 9,000

11 February 1911 Scottish First Division	Hearts	5–0	Kilmarnock	Tynecastle Park
				Attendance: 8,000

18 February 1911 Scottish First Division	Raith Rovers	3–2	Hearts	Stark's Park
				Attendance: 4,000

25 February 1911 Scottish First Division	Morton	2–2	Hearts	Cappielow Park
				Attendance: 6,000

4 March 1911 Scottish First Division	Falkirk	3–1	Hearts	Brockville Park
				Attendance: 5,000

11 March 1911 Scottish First Division	Airdrieonians	4–1	Hearts	Broomfield Park
				Attendance: 2,000

18 March 1911 Scottish First Division	Hearts	2–0	Hamilton Academical	Tynecastle Park
				Attendance: 6,000

25 March 1911 Scottish First Division	Hearts	1–1	Falkirk	Tynecastle Park
				Attendance: 8,000

1 April 1911 Scottish First Division	Hearts	1–1	Celtic	Tynecastle Park
				Attendance: 12,000

29 April 1911 Scottish First Division	Queen's Park	2–0	Hearts	Hampden Park
				Attendance: 2,000

== See also ==
- List of Heart of Midlothian F.C. seasons
