= James Bulloch =

James Bulloch may refer to:

- James Dunwoody Bulloch (1823–1901), Confederate chief foreign agent in Great Britain
- James Stephens Bulloch (1793–1849), Georgia settler, planter and father of James Dunwoody Bulloch
- James Bulloch (footballer) (1909–1992), Scottish footballer
- James "Human Furnace" Bulloch, vocalist in the Ohio metalcore band Ringworm

== See also ==
- Jimmy Bullock (1902–1977), former English footballer
