= Brownlie =

Brownlie is a surname. Notable people with the surname include:

- Cyril Brownlie (1895–1954), New Zealand rugby player
- Dean Brownlie (21st century), Australian-born New Zealand cricketer
- Emma Brownlie (born 1993), Scottish footballer
- Ian Brownlie (21st century), British jurist
- Ira C. Brownlie (19th century), American football coach
- Jimmy Brownlie (1885–1973), Scottish footballer
- John Brownlie (born 1952), Scottish footballer
- Maurice Brownlie (1897–1957), New Zealand rugby player
- Royce Brownlie (born 1980), Australian football player
- Willie Brownlie (1882–1943), Scottish footballer

== See also ==
- Brownlee (surname)
- Julia Brownley, American politician
