= Phil Weir =

Scottish footballer

Personal information
- Full name: Philip Edward Weir
- Date of birth: 1901
- Place of birth: Edinburgh, Scotland
- Date of death: 1963 (aged 61–62)
- Place of death: Buckhaven, Scotland
- Position: Outside right

Senior career*
Years	Team	Apps	(Gls)
–	Edinburgh Emmett		
1922–1935	East Fife	404	(218)
- * Club domestic league appearances and goals

Philip Edward Weir (1901 – 1963) was a Scottish footballer who played mainly as an outside right. His only senior club was East Fife, where he spent 13 seasons and is the record scorer with 228 goals despite playing on the wing – he was initially signed as a centre forward, but was not particularly effective in that role and moved out to allow others, including Arthur McGachie, to act as the focal point of attack.

The vast majority of Weir's goals in the Scottish Football League were scored in its second tier, although in his single season in the top division, 1930–31, he found the net 10 times (McGachie also contributed 14, but the Methil men still finished bottom of the table). This league total is recorded as 215 in some sources, or 218 in others. Weir contributed four goals in seven matches during East Fife's unexpected run to the 1927 Scottish Cup Final as a lower-tier side, where they lost 3–1 to Celtic.

== See also ==
- List of footballers in Scotland by number of league goals (200+)
