= Tom McAteer =

Scottish footballer (1876–1959)

Personal information
- Full name: Thomas McAteer
- Date of birth: 30 March 1876
- Place of birth: Smithstone, Scotland
- Date of death: 20 September 1959 (aged 83)
- Place of death: Kilsyth, Scotland
- Height: 5 ft 10 in (1.78 m)
- Position: Centre half

Senior career*
| Years | Team | Apps | (Gls) |
- Kilsyth Wanderers
| 189?–1898 | Smithston Hibernian | | |
| 1898–1902 | Bolton Wanderers | 59 | (10) |
| 1902–1903 | West Ham United | 13 | (0) |
| 1903–1904 | Brighton & Hove Albion | 33 | (1) |
| 1904–1905 | Dundee | 26 | (3) |
| 1905–1908 | Carlisle United | | |
| 1906–1907 | → Clyde (loan) | 25 | (4) |
| 1908–1910 | Clyde | 64 | (8) |
| 1910–1913 | Celtic | 24 | (4) |
| 1912 | → Wishaw Thistle (loan) | | |
| 1912–1913 | → Albion Rovers (loan) | 23 | (6) |
| 1913–1915 | Abercorn | 5 | (0) |
| 1914–1915 | → Broxburn (loan) | | |
- Cameron Highlanders
| Total | | 272 | (36) |
- * Club domestic league appearances and goals

Thomas McAteer (30 March 1876 – 20 September 1959) was a Scottish professional footballer who played as a centre half in the Football League for Bolton Wanderers, in the Scottish League for Dundee, Clyde, Celtic, Albion Rovers and Abercorn, and in the English Southern League for West Ham United and Brighton & Hove Albion.

== Life and career ==
McAteer was born in Smithstone, Cumbernauld, in 1876, the son of Patrick McAteer, who had migrated to the area to work in the coal mines, and his wife, Margaret Starrs. He played junior football for Kilsyth Wanderers and Smithston Hibernian before moving to England in 1898 to sign for Football League First Division club Bolton Wanderers. He spent four seasons with Bolton, scoring 10 goals from 59 league appearances: they were relegated in the first, he helped them gain promotion in 1899–1900 and played regularly in the third season but lost his place in the fourth, and was released in 1902.

After two seasons in the English Southern League, the first with West Ham United, during which he played only 13 league matches, and the second with Brighton & Hove Albion, where he was appointed captain and played in every match but one, McAteer returned to Scotland where he signed for Dundee in May 1904. He was a regular in the 1904–05 Scottish Division One season as Dundee finished in mid-table, but played only four matches the following season and moved on, to Lancashire Combination club Carlisle United.

He played for Clyde during the 1906–07 season before returning to Carlisle, captaining the team to the second round proper of the 1907–08 FA Cup – no thanks to his missing a penalty in a 2–2 draw with Brentford. After they were eliminated from the competition in February 1908, he joined Clyde on a permanent basis. McAteer captained Clyde as they defeated both Rangers and Celtic to reach the 1910 Scottish Cup Final, a match only settled after two replays when Clyde lost to his former club, Dundee.

At the end of the season, the 34-year-old McAteer signed for Celtic. Never a first-team regular, McAteer still played in 24 Division One matches for his new club, and scored a late goal in the 1911 Scottish Cup Final replay against Hamilton Academical to clinch a 2–0 win. His performances earned him a place in the Home Scots team that faced the Anglo-Scots in an international trial in March 1911, but no call-up ensued.

In 1912, McAteer briefly played for Wishaw Thistle before returning to league football on a part-time basis with Albion Rovers and Abercorn. When war broke out, McAteer enlisted and served with the Cameron Highlanders; he was badly wounded in 1915. After the war he continued as a colliery surface worker.

McAteer and his wife, Mary Clinton, had several children. He died in Kilsyth, Stirlingshire, in 1959 at the age of 83.

== Honours ==
Bolton Wanderers

- Football League Second Division runner-up: 1899–1900

Clyde

- Scottish Cup runner-up: 1909–10

Celtic

- Scottish Cup winner: 1910–11
