= Lennard Sowah =

German professional footballer (born 1992)

Personal information
- Full name: Lennard Adjetey Sowah
- Date of birth: 23 August 1992 (age 34)
- Place of birth: Hamburg, Germany
- Height: 1.87 m (6 ft 2 in)
- Position: Left back

Team information
- Current team: Wandsbeker TSV Concordia
- Number: 44

Youth career
- 2004–2006: SC Urania Hamburg
- 2006–2007: FC St. Pauli
- 2007: Arsenal
- 2007–2010: Portsmouth

Senior career*
Years	Team	Apps	(Gls)
2010	Portsmouth	5	(0)
2010–2013	Hamburger SV	0	(0)
2010–2013	Hamburger SV II	44	(0)
2012	→ Millwall (loan)	0	(0)
2014–2015	FC Vestsjælland	3	(0)
2015–2016	Hamburger SV II	4	(0)
2016–2017	Hamilton Academical	7	(0)
2017	Heart of Midlothian	11	(0)
2017–2018	Cracovia	7	(0)
2018–2019	Hamilton Academical	18	(0)
2021–2025	TuS Dassendorf	68	(2)
2025–	Wandsbeker TSV Concordia	20	(0)

International career
2008	Germany U16	2	(0)
2010	Germany U18	1	(0)
2010	Germany U19	2	(0)
- * Club domestic league appearances and goals as of 8 May 2026

Lennard Adjetey Sowah (born 23 August 1992) is a German professional footballer who plays as a left-back for Wandsbeker TSV Concordia. He has previously played for Portsmouth, Hamburger SV II, FC Vestsjælland, Heart of Midlothian and Cracovia.

== Club career ==
=== Portsmouth ===
Sowah originally came to England after receiving interest from Arsenal. He left Arsenal and joined Portsmouth, where he forced himself onto the periphery of the first team under both Paul Hart and Avram Grant. He was rewarded with the squad number 46 and made his first appearance on the Portsmouth bench in the League Cup win against Carlisle United. He was also named on the bench in FA Cup games against Coventry City and Sunderland. Sowah made his Premier League debut in April 2010 against Blackburn Rovers, as a substitute for Richard Hughes. His next appearance came in a 0–0 draw against Wigan Athletic, in which he played the whole of the second half.

On 18 April 2010, playing against Aston Villa, Sowah became the first player born after the Premier League was formed to start a Premier League match. He was born eight days after the first Premier League matches were played. Sowah's Premier League appearances came as Portsmouth were preparing for the 2010 FA Cup Final against Chelsea, however he was an injury doubt for the final and ultimately did not feature.

=== Hamburger SV ===
On 6 July 2010, Sowah returned to his hometown and signed for Hamburger SV on a free transfer.

==== Millwall (loan) ====
Having not made a single senior appearance for Hamburger SV, he signed on loan for Championship side Millwall until the end of the season on 31 January 2012, his first return to English football since his release from Portsmouth. He failed to make an appearance for the club during his loan spell.

=== FC Vestsjælland ===
On 22 June 2014, Sowah signed a one-year contract with the Danish club FC Vestsjælland.

=== Return to Hamburger SV ===
On 29 July 2016, he returned to Hamburger SV signing a one-year contract with the reserves.

=== Scotland ===
Sowah moved to Scottish club Hamilton Academical in October 2016. He made his debut on 15 October 2016, in a 2–2 draw away to Partick Thistle. In December 2016 it was announced that Sowah would be offered a new contract by the club, however he left the club at the end of his contract on 3 January 2017.

Sowah then signed for another Scottish club, Heart of Midlothian, on a contract due to run until the end of the 2016–17 season. Sowah was released by Hearts at the end of his contract in June 2017.

=== Cracovia ===
On 20 June 2017 he signed a contract with Ekstraklasa side Cracovia.

=== Return to Hamilton ===
In June 2018, he signed again with Hamilton Academical. He left Hamilton in May 2019.

== International career ==
Sowah was born to Ghanaian parents in Hamburg and as such, has both German and Ghanaian citizenship. He has represented Germany at under-16, under-18 level and under-19 level. The Ghanaian FA also declared interest in having him represent their under-20 side.

== Career statistics ==
As of 20 June 2019

Appearances and goals by club, season and competition
Club	Season	League			National cup		League cup		Europe		Other		Total	
Club	Season	Division	Apps	Goals	Apps	Goals	Apps	Goals	Apps	Goals	Apps	Goals	Apps	Goals
Portsmouth	2009–10	Premier League	5	0	0	0	0	0	–		–		5	0
Hamburger SV II	2010–11	Regionalliga Nord	14	0	–		–		–		–		14	0
Hamburger SV II	2011–12	Regionalliga Nord	11	1	–		–		–		–		11	1
Hamburger SV II	2012–13	Regionalliga Nord	19	0	–		–		–		–		19	0
Hamburger SV II	Total		44	1	–		–		–		–		44	1
Millwall (loan)	2012–13	Championship	0	0	0	0	0	0	–		–		0	0
FC Vestsjælland	2014–15	Danish Superliga	3	0	1	0	–		–		–		4	0
Hamburger SV II	2015–16	Regionalliga Nord	4	0	–		–		–		–		4	0
Hamilton Academical	2016–17	Scottish Premiership	7	0	0	0	0	0	–		–		7	0
Heart of Midlothian	2016–17	Scottish Premiership	11	0	4	0	0	0	0	0	–		15	0
Cracovia	2017–18	Ekstraklasa	7	0	1	0	–		0	0	–		8	0
Hamilton Academical	2018–19	Scottish Premiership	18	0	1	0	2	0	–		–		21	0
Career total			99	1	7	0	2	0	0	0	0	0	108	1
