= John Thomson (footballer, born 1915) =

Scottish footballer

Personal information
- Full name: John Fyfe Thomson
- Date of birth: 1915
- Place of birth: Hamilton, Scotland
- Date of death: 30 July 1944 (aged 28)
- Place of death: Normandy, France
- Height: 5 ft 7 in (1.70 m)
- Position: Left half

Senior career*
Years	Team	Apps	(Gls)
–	Blantyre Victoria		
1932–1942	Hamilton Academical	167	(5)
- * Club domestic league appearances and goals

John Fyfe Thomson (1915 – 30 July 1944) was a Scottish footballer who played for Hamilton Academical, mainly as a left half. He became an increasingly important member of the Accies team during the 1930s during which they consistently finished in the top half of the Scottish Football League's top division, although an injury kept him out of the team for the club's most significant achievement of the era, the run to the 1935 Scottish Cup Final.

Thomson joined the Gordon Highlanders during World War II, playing in wartime competitions for Hamilton, Ayr United and Albion Rovers. He was killed in action in France during the Battle of Normandy while serving with the 2nd Battalion, Gordon Highlanders, part of the 15th (Scottish) Infantry Division, in 1944, aged 28. He is buried at Hottot-les-Bagues War Cemetery and commemorated in a small plaque at the New Douglas Park stadium, along with Jimmy Morgan, a teammate who also died in the conflict (coincidentally, a day later in an unrelated incident).

== See also ==
- List of footballers killed during World War II
