= Daniel Kelley =

Daniel Kelley may refer to:

- Daniel E. Kelley (1843–1905), musician
- Daniel Kelley (hacker), British computer hacker
- Daniel Kelley (researcher), researcher of the Anti-Defamation League
- Danny Kelley (born 1964), stock car racer
- Dan Kelley (born 1970), former Iowa State Representative

== See also ==
- Daniel Kelly (disambiguation)
