= Brownlee (surname) =

Brownlee is an English or Scottish toponymic surname, derived from either Brownlee, Lanarkshire or Brownley, Warwickshire. Notable people with the surname include:

- Alistair Brownlee (born 1988), British triathlete
- Bruce Brownlee, New Zealand squash player
- Caresha Brownlee (born 1994), American rapper known as Yung Miami
- Charles Brownlee (1821–1890), Cape Colony politician
- Derek Brownlee (born 1974), Scottish politician
- Donald E. Brownlee, American astronomer
- Edward M. Brownlee, American sculptor
- Gerry Brownlee (born 1956), New Zealand politician
- Helen Brownlee, Australian executive
- Jarvis Brownlee Jr. (born 2001), American football player
- Jason Brownlee (born 1999), American football player
- John Brownlee (statistician) (1868–1927), British statistician
- John Brownlee (baritone) (1900–1969), Australian operatic baritone
- John Edward Brownlee (1884–1961), Canadian politician
- John L. Brownlee, American lawyer and politician from Virginia
- Jonny Brownlee (born 1990), British triathlete
- Justin Brownlee (born 1988), American-Filipino basketball player
- Karen Brownlee, American social worker and politician
- Kimberley Brownlee (born 1978), Canadian philosopher
- Lawrence Brownlee, American operatic tenor
- Les Brownlee, American army officer and politician
- Mark Brownlee (born 1942), New Zealand rower
- Marques Brownlee (born 1993), American video blogger
- Norman Brownlee (1896–1967), American jazz musician and orchestra leader
- Robert Brownlee (1942–1991), American chemist
- Ryan Brownlee (born 1976), American baseball coach
- Scott Brownlee (born 1969), New Zealand rower
- Shona Brownlee, British skier and RAF aircraftwoman
- Sophia Grace Brownlee (born 2003), English Internet personality and singer, Sophia Grace & Rosie
- William Craig Brownlee (1784–1860), American clergyman

== See also ==
- Julia Brownley, American politician
- Brownlie (disambiguation)
