= List of footballers in Scotland by number of league goals =

More than 30 players have scored at least 200 domestic league goals in Scottish league football. This includes the appearances and goals of former players, in domestic league competitions only, specifically the Scottish Premier League (1998–2013), Scottish Football League (1890–2013) and Scottish Professional Football League (2013–present).

Due to the close connections between English and Scottish football, several players have played for clubs in Scotland and in the English Football League and/or Premier League and amassed over 200 goals across the two systems, including David McLean (over 160 goals in both), Joe Baker (over 140 in both), Neil Martin (over 110 in both) and Kenny Dalglish (over 110 in both).

== List of players ==
Bold = All goals scored in top division.

Player	Nationality	Goals (Note: Number of League goals only.)	Games (Note: Number of League games only.)	Position	Seasons (Note: Number of League seasons only.)	Clubs (Note: Number of different League clubs only; two spells with the same club should only be counted once.)	Notes
Jimmy McGrory	Scotland	**408**	408	FW	16	2	(Note: As of 2021, among 39 players to have scored over 300 goals in one national league.)
Bob McPhail	Scotland	**305**	468	FW	17	2	
Hughie Ferguson	Scotland	**286**	305	FW	10	2	(Note: Also scored 77 English Football League goals in 117 matches.)
Ally McCoist	Scotland	282	528	FW	18	3	(Note: Also scored 8 goals in 56 EFL matches.)
Willie Reid	Scotland	**270**	367	FW	19	5	
Gordon Wallace	Scotland	264	487	FW	17	4	(Note: Also scored 20 goals in 45 North American Soccer League matches.)
Jimmy McColl	Scotland	**263**	455+	FW	18	5	(Note: Also scored 5 EFL goals in 27 matches.)
Bob Ferrier	England	**255**	626	MF	20	1 (Note: Motherwell)	
David Wilson	England	255	329	FW	11	1 (Note: Hamilton Academical)	
Willie MacFadyen	Scotland	251	410	FW	17	3	(Note: Also scored 18+ EFL goals in 48+ matches.)
Willie Wallace	Scotland	247	505	FW	17	5	. (Note: Also scored 4 EFL goals in 39 matches)
Jimmy Smith	Scotland	241	249	FW	19	2	(Note: Also scored goals in unofficial wartime competitions.)
Andy Cunningham	Scotland	**236**	534	FW	21	2	. (Note: Also scored 1 EFL goal in 15 matches)
Owen Coyle	Republic of Ireland	236	612	FW	20	10	(Note: Also scored 12 EFL goals in 54 matches.)
Jimmy Fleming	Scotland	235	339	FW	14	3	
Ken Eadie	Scotland	230	510	FW	20	6	
David McCrae	Scotland	229	333	FW	12	3	(Note: Also scored at least 2 EFL goals in an uncertain number of matches.)
John Robertson	Scotland	229	558	FW	18	3	(Note: Also played in 12 EFL matches without scoring.)
Kris Boyd	Scotland	225	478	FW	16	2	(Note: Also scored 12 EFL goals in 37 matches and 7 Major League Soccer goals in 26 matches.)
Keith Wright	Scotland	222	637	FW	20	6	
Robert Hamilton	Scotland	**221**	325	FW	15	4	(Note: Also scored 11 EFL goals in 29 matches.)
John Brogan	Scotland	221	549	FW	21	6	
Phil Weir	Scotland	218	404	FW	14	2	
Joe McBride	Scotland	**217**	358	FW	14	7	(Note: Also scored 9 EFL goals in 25 matches.)
Joe Harper	Scotland	216	361	FW	17	3	(Note: Also scored 16 EFL goals in 71 matches.)
Jimmy Wardhaugh	Scotland	**210**	315	FW	15	2	
Colin McGlashan	Scotland	210	609	FW	20	9	
Patsy Gallacher	Ireland	**207**	562	FW	21	2	
Tommy Coyne	Republic of Ireland	204	522	FW	20	7	(Note: Also scored 1 EFL goal in 12 matches.)
Willie Irvine	Scotland	201	571	FW	19	9	(Note: Also had spell in Tippeligaen (Norway), statistics uncertain.)
Jim Patterson	Scotland	200	361	FW	14	1 (Note: Queen of the South)	

== See also ==
- List of footballers in Scotland by number of league appearances
- List of footballers in England by number of league appearances
- List of footballers in England by number of league goals
