= Willie McLaren (1930s footballer) =

Scottish footballer

Personal information
- Place of birth: Glasgow, Scotland
- Height: 5 ft 10 in (1.78 m)
- Position: Inside right

Senior career*
Years	Team	Apps	(Gls)
–	Shettleston		
1931–1936	Hamilton Academical	138	(33)
1936–1938	St Johnstone	43	(15)
1938–1939	Morton	4	(3)
Total		185	(49)
- * Club domestic league appearances and goals

William McLaren was a Scottish footballer who played as an inside right for Hamilton Academical, St Johnstone and Morton.

He played the bulk of his career with Hamilton, and was converted from a centre forward in his first season there after joining from junior team Shettleston with a reputation as a goalscorer. He appeared for Accies in the 1935 Scottish Cup Final which ended in a 2–1 defeat to Rangers. Later that year he saved a penalty in a match against Clyde after goalkeeper Jimmy Morgan was sent off. A notable feat a few years earlier was scoring four times in a 5–0 Scottish Football League win over Dundee United in April 1932.
