= 1934–35 Scottish Cup =

Tournament details
- Country: Scotland

Final positions
- Champions: Rangers
- Runners-up: Hamilton Academical

The 1934–35 Scottish Cup was the 57th staging of Scotland's most prestigious football knockout competition. The Cup was won by Rangers who defeated Hamilton Academical in the final.

== Fourth round ==
Team One	Team Two	Score
Motherwell	Rangers	1–4
Airdrieonians	Hearts	2–3
Aberdeen	Celtic	3–1
Hamilton Academical	St Johnstone	3–0

== Semi-finals ==
30 March 1935

Hamilton Academical	2–1	Aberdeen

Attendance: 31,942

30 March 1935

Rangers	1–1	Hearts
Gillick

Hampden Park, Glasgow
Attendance: 102,661

=== Replays ===
3 April 1935

Rangers	2–0	Hearts
McPhail; Main

Hampden Park, Glasgow
Attendance: 90,428

== Final ==
20 April 1935

Rangers	2–1	Hamilton Academical
Smith 37' 61'		Harrison

Hampden Park, Glasgow
Attendance: 87,740

=== Teams ===
Hamilton:
GK	Jimmy Morgan
RB	Bobby Wallace
LB	Jamie Bulloch
RH	Jackie Cox
CH	Jimmy McStay
LH	Joe Murray
OR	James King
IR	Willie McLaren
CF	David Wilson
IL	Robert Harrison
OL	Bobby Reid

Rangers:
GK	Jerry Dawson
RB	Dougie Gray
LB	Whitey McDonald
RH	James Kennedy
CH	Jimmy Simpson
LH	George Brown
OR	Bobby Main
IR	Alex Venters
CF	Jimmy Smith
IL	Bob McPhail
OL	Torry Gillick

== See also ==
- 1934–35 in Scottish football
