= Hugh McNeil =

Scottish footballer

Personal information
- Date of birth: 1878
- Place of birth: Motherwell, Scotland
- Date of death: 10 January 1960 (aged 81–82)
- Place of death: Hartwood, Scotland
- Position: Centre half

Senior career*
Years	Team	Apps	(Gls)
–	Mossend Brigade		
–	Dalziel Rovers		
1899–1900	Motherwell	16	(2)
1900–1902	Celtic	2	(0)
1901	→ Motherwell (loan)	3	(0)
1901–1902	Hamilton Academical	18	(2)
1902–1904	Morton	45	(3)
1904–1914	Motherwell	248	(4)
1914–1915	Wishaw Thistle		
1915–1916	Royal Albert		
Total		332	(11)
- * Club domestic league appearances and goals

Hugh McNeil (1878 – 10 January 1960) was a Scottish footballer who played as a centre half, with his longest spell being ten years with Motherwell. He had already spent a season with the club earlier in his career after graduating from the junior level, with his other Scottish Football League employers between his two main Fir Park spells being Celtic (his time there including a short loan back to Motherwell), Hamilton Academical and Morton. He survived a serious motorcycle crach in 1913, later going on to play for Wishaw Thistle and Royal Albert.

His son of the same name was also a footballer who too played for Motherwell and Hamilton in the same position.
