= Yuck! The Nature and Moral Significance of Disgust =

2011 book by Daniel Ryan Kelly

- Author: Daniel Ryan Kelly
- Language: English
- Subject: disgust
- Publisher: MIT Press
- Publication date: 2011
- Media type: Print
- Pages: 194
- ISBN: 9780262015585

Yuck! The Nature and Moral Significance of Disgust is a 2011 book by Daniel Ryan Kelly in which the author provides a philosophical examination of disgust.
