= Daniel Kelly (artist) =

American painter

Daniel Kelly (born 1947) is an American artist based in Kyoto, Japan. Works primarily consist of original paintings and prints. Paintings usually begin with three-dimensional collage making incorporating materials that can be found in Japan such as tatami and bamboo mats. In printmaking Kelly primarily works with lithography and woodblock, often using chine-collé to incorporate materials such as antique Japanese book pages, ukiyo-e and calligraphy into his prints.

== Museums and collections ==
A selection of prints by Daniel Kelly included in public collections:

- Children's Parade (1982). Woodblock. 16.9 cm x 72 cm. Metropolitan Museum of Art, NY, NY.
- Shimmer (1982). Woodblock. 29.2 cm x 76.3 cm. British Museum, London.
- Buttercups (1983). Woodblock. 17.5 cm x 70.5 cm. Metropolitan Museum of Art, NY, NY; British Museum, London.
- Spring Shower (1983). Woodblock. 10.5 cm x 76.5 cm. British Museum, London.
- Blaine (1985). Lithograph. 48 cm x 78 cm. Museum of Modern Art, NY, NY; New York Public Library; Brooklyn Museum.
- Letter From Japan (1985). Lithograph, chine-collé. 50 cm x 100 cm. Metropolitan Museum of Art, NY, NY.
- Crisscross (1985). Lithograph. 65 cm x 98 cm. British Museum, London.
- Night Light (1987). Lithograph, chine-collé. 62 cm x 80 cm. Smithsonian American Art Museum, Washington, DC.
- Shiga's Underwear (1989). Lithograph, woodblock, chine-collé. 63 cm x 98 cm. Art Gallery of New South Wales, Sydney, Australia.
- Black Gold (1990). Lithograph. 54 cm x 64 cm. Cleveland Museum of Art, Cleveland, OH.
- October (1997). Woodblock print with hand-coloring on paper. 154.8 cm x 205 cm. Freer Gallery of Art, Washington, DC.
- Nene (2002). Woodblock. Cleveland Museum of Art, Cleveland, OH.
- Momo (2003). Woodblock, chine-collé. 70.5 cm x 109 cm. Los Angeles County Museum of Art, Los Angeles, CA.
