= John Waugh (footballer, born 1889) =

Scottish footballer

Personal information
- Date of birth: 1889
- Place of birth: Dykehead, Scotland
- Height: 5 ft 9 in (1.75 m)
- Position: Inside right

Youth career
- Dykehead

Senior career*
Years	Team	Apps	(Gls)
1906–1908	Heart of Midlothian	4	(0)
1907	→ Ayr Parkhouse (loan)	5	(2)
1907–1908	Ayr Parkhouse	2	(0)
1908–1909	Dykehead		
1909–1914	Hamilton Academical	110	(21)
1913–1914	→ Raith Rovers (loan)	30	(2)
1914–1916	Motherwell	68	(23)
Total		219	(48)
- * Club domestic league appearances and goals

John Waugh (born 1889) was a Scottish footballer who played mainly as an inside right for clubs including Heart of Midlothian (where he was a teenage reserve behind Bobby Walker), Ayr Parkhouse, Hamilton Academical, Raith Rovers and Motherwell. He played for Hamilton in the 1911 Scottish Cup Final, lost to Celtic after a replay.
