= Jim Sherry =

Scottish footballer (born 1979)

Personal information
- Date of birth: 9 September 1973 (age 53)
- Place of birth: Glasgow, Scotland
- Position: Midfielder

Youth career
- Rangers
- Hamilton Academical

Senior career*
Years	Team	Apps	(Gls)
1993-1998	Hamilton Academical	94	(11)
1998-2000	Livingston	22	(4)
- → Portadown (loan)
	→ Hamilton Academical (loan)	6	(0)
2000-2004	Hamilton Academical	86	(2)
- * Club domestic league appearances and goals

Jim Sherry (born 9 September 1973) is a Scottish former footballer who played as a midfielder for Hamilton Academical and Livingston.

== Career ==
=== Playing career ===
Sherry began his career at Rangers as a schoolboy, but did not make a single first team appearance for the club.

He then signed as a youth team player for Hamilton Academical and then graduated to the first team, making 94 appearances and scoring 11 goals for the Accies.

In 1998, ambitious Livingston had invested heavily in their playing squad and recruited Sherry to the Almondvale Stadium. He was part of the team that won 1998–99 Scottish Second Division. However Sherry found regular game time difficult to come by and had loan spells at Portadown and for his former club Hamilton Academical. He re-signed for the Accies permanently in 2000.

Sherry made 86 appearances in his second spell at New Douglas Park between 2000 and 2004 before retiring from the professional game.

== Post-playing career ==
Sherry is now a football agent.

== Honours ==
Livingston

- Scottish Football League Second Division : 1998-99
