= Robert Harrison (footballer) =

Scottish footballer

Personal information
- Full name: Robert Grieve Harrison
- Date of birth: 1911
- Place of birth: Greenock, Scotland
- Date of death: 1950 (aged 38–39)
- Place of death: Greenock, Scotland
- Position: Inside left

Senior career*
Years	Team	Apps	(Gls)
–	Port Glasgow Athletic Juniors		
1930–1934	Airdrieonians	65	(17)
1934–1937	Hamilton Academical	124	(72)
1937–1939	Rangers	14	(5)
1939–1941	Hamilton Academical	0	(0)
Total		203	(96)

International career
1935–1936	Scottish League XI	2	(3)
- * Club domestic league appearances and goals

Robert Grieve Harrison (1911–1950), sometimes known as Bertie Harrison, was a Scottish footballer who played as an inside left for Airdrieonians, Hamilton Academical and Rangers.

He played in the 1935 Scottish Cup Final for Accies, scoring his side's goal in a 2–1 defeat to Rangers, and he was also selected for the Scottish Football League XI on two occasions (and a reserve for the full Scotland team during his spell in Hamilton. His career was curtailed by World War II, in which he served in the Royal Air Force. Health problems led to his withdrawal from the RAF and his retirement from sport (he had also been a keen golfer).
