= Danny Kelly (BBC WM presenter) =

British DJ

- Born: Daniel Vincent Kelly; 1970 (age 55–56); Liverpool, England
- Occupation: Radio Broadcaster

Daniel Vincent Kelly (born 1970) is a British radio presenter based in Birmingham.

== Life ==
Kelly was born in Liverpool. He is 6'5" tall, a fact that he enjoys telling his listeners.

In a humorous stunt, he announced on 3 March 2020 via his BBC Radio WM phone-in show that he had changed his name to Joe Lycett, following comedian Joe Lycett's 1 March announcement that he would thereafter be known as Hugo Boss.

Kelly lives in Warwick and is married to Danielle.

== Career ==
Danny Kelly has had a varied career working as a used car salesman and chef before moving into local radio 15 years ago. He started as a reporter at BBC Radio Coventry and became a roving reporter on the Adrian Goldberg breakfast show at BBC/WM. He has presented many shows at BBC/WM; the early morning show, the lunchtime show, the afternoon show, the late show, the Sunday morning show and the afternoon show again.

One of the more significant items that occurred during his programme was the BBC/WM Christmas Toy Appeal 2003. It took Danny 5 days to walk from Pebble Mill to the Mailbox collecting toys. A simple enough task but he went via West Bromwich, Wednesbury, Walsall, Bloxwich, Willenhall, Wolverhampton, Sedgley, Dudley and Merry Hill.

On 18 May 2010, the BBC was forced to give out an apology after Kelly made a practical joke live on air that Queen Elizabeth II had died. He began playing the national anthem whilst telling listeners to his radio show that he had some 'astonishing news' to deliver. He had been half-way through his 2-hour afternoon radio programme on BBC WM when the announcement was made. His producer, Mark Newman, interrupted and informed him, 'You can't say that'.
