= John McLaughlin (footballer, born 1890) =

Scottish footballer

Personal information
- Full name: John Herbert McLaughlin
- Date of birth: 1890
- Place of birth: Dennistoun, Scotland
- Date of death: 1973 (aged 82–83)
- Place of death: Hamilton, Scotland
- Position: Outside right

Senior career*
Years	Team	Apps	(Gls)
–	Blantyre Victoria		
–	Strathclyde		
1910–1913	Hamilton Academical	77	(10)
1913–1916	Morton	25	(10)
1919–1920	Hamilton Academical	15	(1)
Total		117	(21)
- * Club domestic league appearances and goals

John Herbert McLaughlin (1890–1973) was a Scottish footballer who played as an outside right.

In his first year at senior level with Hamilton Academical, he took part in the 1911 Scottish Cup Final, which Accies lost to Celtic after a replay. He also played for Morton before retiring during World War I to pursue his other profession of a dentist, although he returned to Hamilton for one season once the conflict had ended.

His father, also John Herbert McLaughlin, was a prominent figure in 19th-century Scottish football, serving as chairman of Celtic and president of both the Scottish Football Association and the Scottish Football League.
