= Ryan Blackadder =

Scottish footballer

Personal information
- Date of birth: 11 October 1983 (age 43)
- Place of birth: Kirkcaldy, Scotland
- Height: 1.75 m (5 ft 9 in)
- Position: Midfielder

Senior career*
Years	Team	Apps	(Gls)
2002–2003	Raith Rovers	45	(6)
2003–2006	Hamilton Academical	26	(0)
2006–2009	East Fife	59	(7)
- * Club domestic league appearances and goals as of 12:26, 22 October 2008 (UTC)

Ryan Blackadder (born 11 October 1983) is a Retired Scottish footballer though he did play for Glenrothes FC since then has retired. He has also played for Raith Rovers, Hamilton Accies and East Fife.
