= Walter Agnew =

Scottish footballer (1939–2023)

Personal information
- Date of birth: 28 January 1939
- Date of death: 7 August 2023 (aged 84)
- Position: Outside right

Senior career*
Years	Team	Apps	(Gls)
1958–1959	Hamilton Academical	17	(1)
- * Club domestic league appearances and goals

Walter Agnew (28 January 1939 – 7 August 2023) was a Scottish footballer. He mainly played outside right for Hamilton Academical in 21 appearances (17 league and 4 league cup) between 1958 and 1959 and scored 2 goals. He also played for Strathclyde Juniors, Pollok Juniors, Larkhall Rangers and Hamilton Cross Club.

He began his career at the Accies debuting on 1 March 1958 in a 7–2 victory at home against Stenhousemuir. His first goal came on 21 April that same year in a 3–1 victory against Berwick Rangers. Next season, on 30 August 1958, he scored at home in a 3–0 victory over Montrose in the league cup.
