= Kieran Monlouis =

Saint Lucian footballer (born 1995)

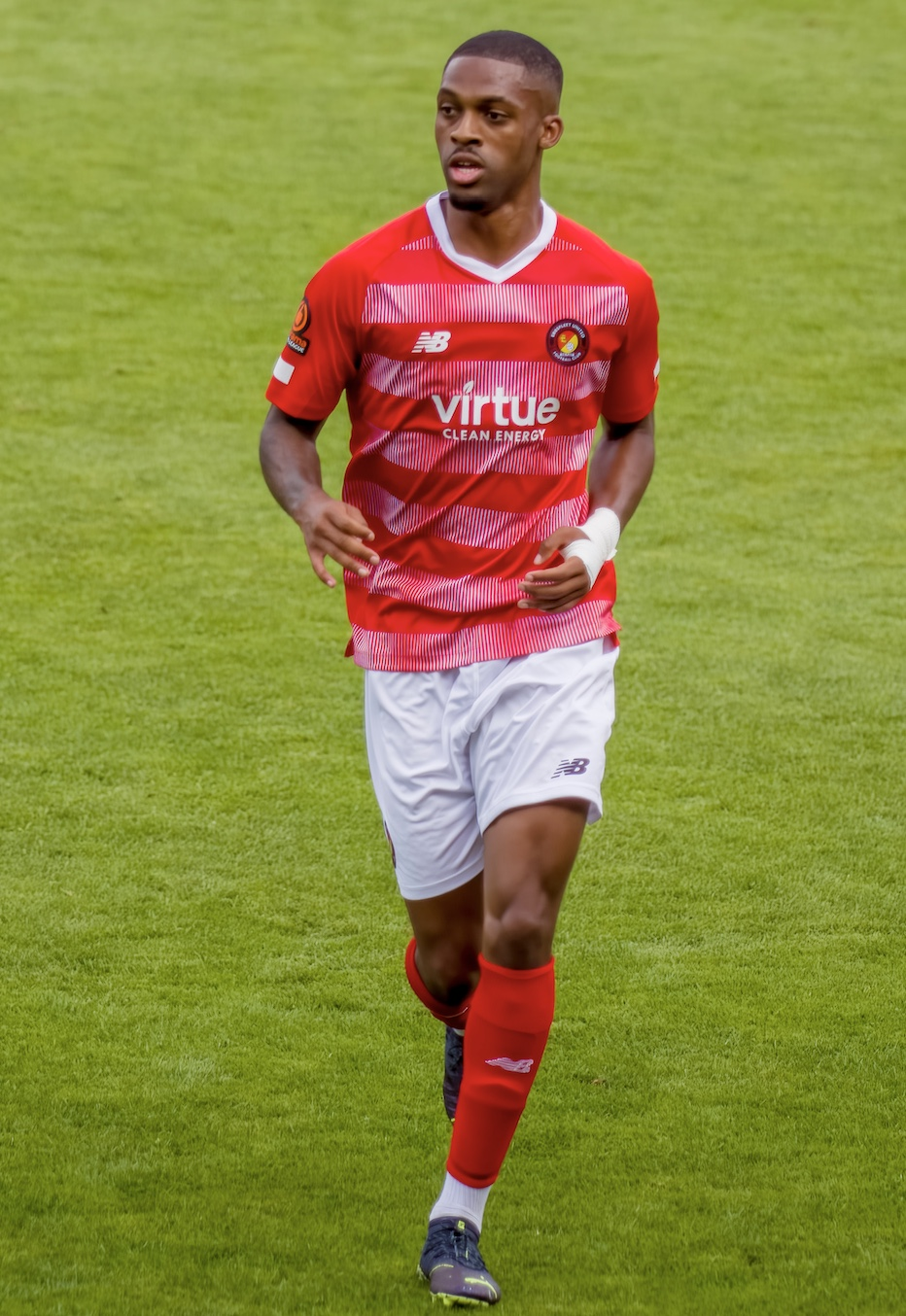
- Monlouis with Ebbsfleet United in 2022

Personal information
- Full name: Kieran Dion Monlouis
- Date of birth: 15 April 1996 (age 30)
- Place of birth: Lewisham, England
- Height: 1.77 m (5 ft 10 in)
- Position: Midfielder

Youth career
- Crystal Palace
- Stoke City
- –2015: Charlton Athletic

Senior career*
| Years | Team | Apps | (Gls) |
| 2015–2017 | Maldon & Tiptree | 53 | (3) |
| 2017 | AFC Sudbury | 8 | (0) |
| 2017–2018 | St Albans City | 45 | (2) |
| 2018–2019 | Hamilton Academical | 0 | (0) |
| 2019 | Hemel Hempstead Town | 12 | (1) |
| 2019–2020 | Dulwich Hamlet | 14 | (1) |
| 2019–2020 | → Margate (loan) | 11 | (1) |
| 2020–2021 | Horsham | 8 | (0) |
| 2021–2023 | Ebbsfleet United | 16 | (3) |
| 2024 | Dover Athletic | 1 | (0) |

International career^{‡}
| 2019– | Saint Lucia | 2 | (0) |
- * Club domestic league appearances and goals as of 15:56, 17 October 2024 (UTC) ‡ National team caps and goals as of 18:28, 26 February 2021 (UTC)

Kieran Dion Monlouis (born 15 April 1996) is a footballer who last played as a midfielder for Dover Athletic.

Born in England, Monlouis represents the Saint Lucia national football team. After playing youth football for Crystal Palace, Stoke City and Charlton Athletic, Monlouis has played senior football for Maldon & Tiptree, AFC Sudbury, St Albans City, Hamilton Academical, Hemel Hempstead Town, Dulwich Hamlet, Margate and Horsham.

== Club career ==
Born in Lewisham, Monlouis played youth football for Crystal Palace, Stoke City and Charlton Athletic, but was released by Charlton Athletic at the end of the 2014–15 season. In July 2015, Monlouis signed for Maldon & Tiptree of the Isthmian League Division One North as part of a new co-operation between Maldon & Tiptree and Colchester United. He scored 3 goals in 38 league appearances during the 2015–16 season. He had an unsuccessful trial spell with Norwich City in summer 2016. He made 15 league appearances without scoring for Maldon & Tiptree cross the 2016–17 season, the last of which came on 7 January 2017.

Following a one-month trial spell with Barnet, he signed for Isthmian League Premier Division AFC Sudbury on 16 February 2017. He made his debut for the club that day in a 1–0 win over Worthing. In March 2017, he signed for National League South side St Albans City, after just eight appearances for Sudbury. He made his debut for St Albans on 25 March 2017 as a substitute in a 1–0 win at home to Dartford. He made 6 more league appearances from them until the end of the season. He scored twice in 38 league matches across the 2017–18 season.

In August 2018, he signed for Scottish Premiership club Hamilton Academical on a two-year deal. He left Hamilton in January 2019 without playing for the club. He signed for Hemel Hempstead Town of the National League South in February 2019. He scored 1 goal in 12 league matches for Hemel Hempstead Town.

Monlouis joined National League South club Dulwich Hamlet in the summer of 2019. On 23 November 2019, he was loaned out to Margate for one month. The deal was later extended until the end of January 2020. He returned to Dulwich Hamlet at the end of his loan on 31 January 2020, having made 11 league appearances and scoring 1 goal. He left Dulwich Hamlet in summer 2020, having scored once in 14 league appearances for the club.

Monlouis signed for Horsham in August 2020 after playing for the club in pre-season.

In June 2021, Monlois joined National League South side Ebbsfleet United.

Monlouis scored on his debut for Ebbsfleet United in a 1–0 win over Aylesbury United in the FA Cup 3rd round of qualifying.

On 5 October 2024, Monlouis joined Dover Athletic. The club announced his departure just nine days later however following a set-back in his return from long-term injury.

== International career ==
Born in England, Monlouis is of Saint Lucian descent. Monlouis made his professional debut for the Saint Lucia in a 2019–20 CONCACAF Nations League 1–0 win over the Dominican Republic on 16 November 2019.
