= Hugh McNeil Jr =

Scottish footballer

Hugh McNeil
Personal information
- Date of birth: 8 August 1902
- Place of birth: Motherwell, Scotland
- Positions: Centre half; right half

Senior career*
Years	Team	Apps	(Gls)
–	Larkhall Thistle		
1923–1926	Hamilton Academical	70	(0)
1926–1930	Motherwell	85	(1)
Total		154	(1)
- * Club domestic league appearances and goals

Hugh McNeil (born 1902) was a Scottish footballer who played as a centre half or right half for Hamilton Academical and Motherwell. He was still featuring fairly regularly for the Steelmen (11 league appearances in the 1929–30 season) when he emigrated to Nigeria to work in the oil industry, having obtained a university degree.

His father of the same name was also a footballer who too played for Motherwell and Hamilton in the same position.
