= Gary Gow =

Scottish footballer

Personal information
- Date of birth: 24 January 1990 (age 36)
- Place of birth: Scotland
- Position: Midfielder

Youth career
- Hamilton Academical

Senior career*
Years	Team	Apps	(Gls)
2008–2009	Hamilton Academical	1	(0)
2010–2011	Kirkintilloch Rob Roy	24	(4)
- * Club domestic league appearances and goals

Gary Gow (born 24 January 1990) is a Scottish professional footballer who played for Hamilton Academical.

== Career ==
He made his league debut for Hamilton against Dundee. He signed a new one-year contract with the club in May 2009.

He later played for Kirkintilloch Rob Roy.
