= Daniel P. Kelly =

American physician (born 1955)

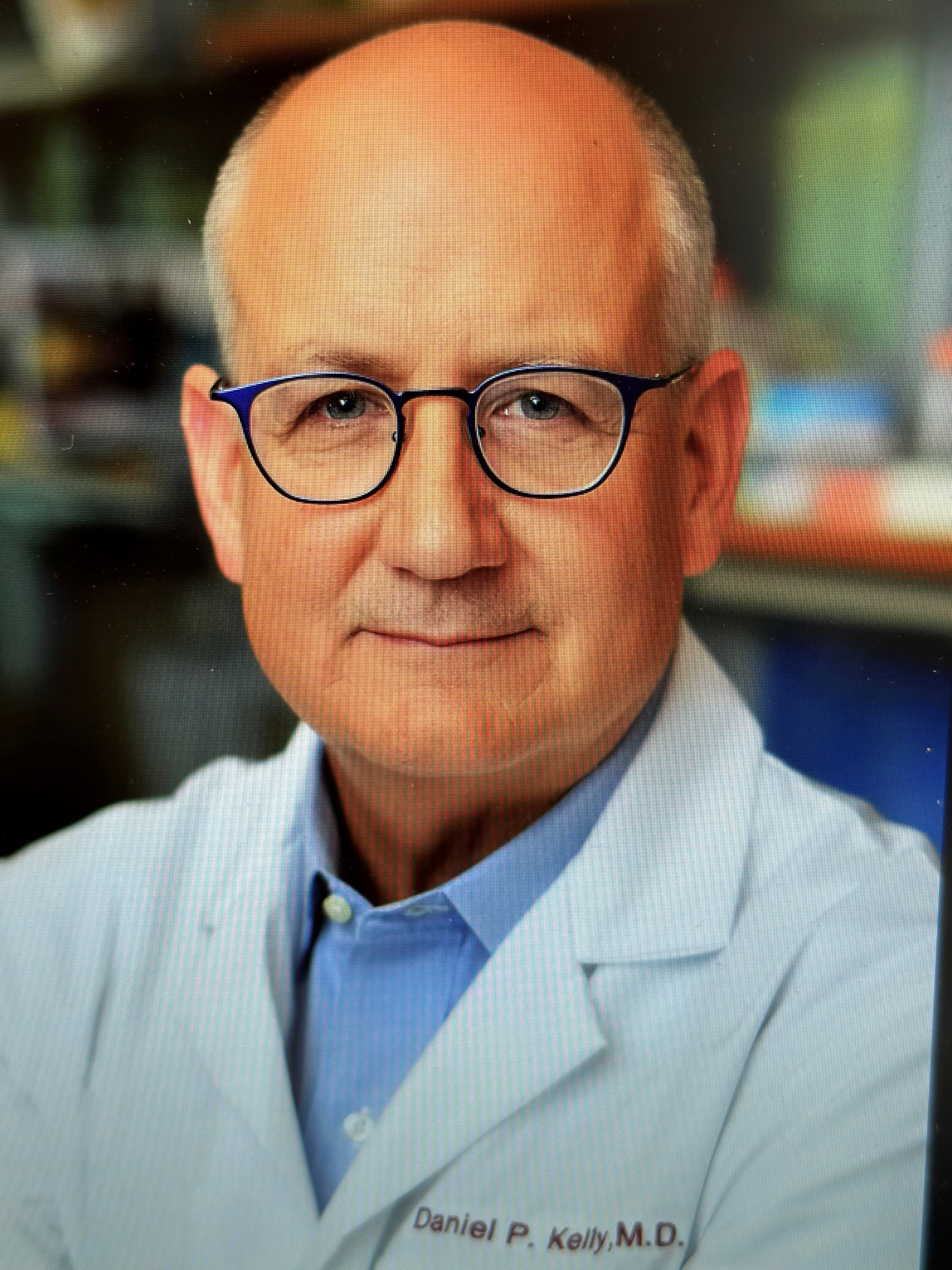
- October, 2016
- Born: 1955 in Fukuoka, Japan (US Army Base)
- Education: Stevenson High School (Lincolnshire, Illinois) (1974) University of Illinois (B.S., 1978) University of Illinois College of Medicine, Chicago, Illinois (M.D., 1982)
- Known for: Known for his contributions to the transcriptional control of mitochondrial function and the metabolic origins of heart disease.
- Awards: American Heart Association (BCVS) Distinguished Achievement Award (2008) American Heart Association Basic Science Prize (2009) Peter Harris Distinguished Scientist Award of the International Society for Heart Research (ISHR) (2023)
- Scientific career
- Fields: Biomedical Research
- Workplaces: University of Pennsylvania Children's Hospital of Philadelphia Sanford Burnham Prebys Medical Discovery Institute Washington University in St. Louis

Daniel P. Kelly (born 1955) is Director of the Penn and CHOP Cardiovascular Institutes (CVI) and the Willard and Rhoda Ware Professor of Diabetes and Metabolic Diseases at the University of Pennsylvania Perelman School of Medicine and the Rachel Ash Presidential Professor at Children's Hospital of Philadelphia (CHOP). He is a cardiologist and physician-scientist recognized for his contributions to the transcriptional control of mitochondrial function and the metabolic origins of heart disease.

== Education and Career ==
Kelly obtained his medical degree from the University of Illinois College of Medicine, internal medicine residency training at Barnes Hospital in St. Louis, and clinical cardiology and research training at Washington University School of Medicine (WUSM) in St. Louis. He joined the WUSM faculty in 1989 and rapidly moved up the ranks to Professor of Medicine, Molecular Biology & Pharmacology, and Pediatrics, Chief of the Cardiovascular Division, Alumni Endowed Professor of Cardiovascular Diseases. and first Director of the Center for Cardiovascular Research. In 2008, Kelly assumed the role of founding Scientific Director for the Sanford Burnham Prebys Medical Discovery Institute site in Orlando, Florida. In August 2017, he moved to the University of Pennsylvania where he was named Director of the Penn Cardiovascular Institute (CVI). In 2022, Kelly also assumed the position of founding Director of a new CVI at Children's Hospital of Philadelphia (CHOP) with the mission of addressing unmet needs in cardiovascular health and disease throughout the lifespan.

== Research ==
Kelly's research interests stem from an early fascination with rare inborn errors in mitochondrial metabolism in children which cause sudden death and heart failure. He defined the genetic basis for a common inborn error in mitochondrial fatty acid oxidation, work that led to the development of practical screening tests to detect risk for sudden death in newborns. His work defined a master regulatory axis that controls fuel metabolism in heart through pioneering studies on nuclear receptors including the peroxisome proliferator-activated receptors (PPARs), estrogen-related receptors (ERRs), and their transcriptional coactivators. Kelly and his team found that the failing heart begins to rely on ketone bodies as a fuel, work that has led to first in human studies aimed at assessing ketone supplementation in patients with heart failure. He has mentored over 65 MD, PhD, and MD-PhD graduate and post-graduate trainees.

== Awards and Honors ==
Kelly has been elected to the American Society of Clinical Investigation (Council Member, 2002–2005), Association of American Physicians (Council Member, 2017 - 2023; President, 2022–2023), Association of University of Cardiologists, Association of Professors of Cardiology and the International Society for Heart Research (ISHR, Council Member, 2018 - 2024). He is a recipient of a Lucille Markey Scholar Award, March of Dimes Basal O’Connor Scholar Award, the American Heart Association (AHA) Established Investigator Award, AHA Basic Science Prize, and AHA Distinguished Achievement Award, and the ISHR Peter Harris Distinguished Scientist Award. He serves, or has served, on the Editorial Boards of Genes & Development, Circulation, Circulation Research, The Journal of Clinical Investigation, and the Journal of the American College of Cardiology: Basic to Translational Science.
