= Jacob Marsden =

English footballer

Personal information
- Full name: Jacob Anthony Marsden
- Date of birth: 14 October 1996 (age 30)
- Place of birth: Great Yarmouth, England
- Height: 1.86 m (6 ft 1 in)
- Position: Goalkeeper

Team information
- Current team: Concord Rangers

Youth career
- 2010–2016: Ipswich Town

Senior career*
| Years | Team | Apps | (Gls) |
| 2016–2017 | Ipswich Town | 0 | (0) |
| 2016–2017 | → Leiston (loan) | 25 | (0) |
| 2017 | St Ives Town | 3 | (0) |
| 2017–2018 | Mildenhall Town | 9 | (0) |
| 2018–2019 | Hamilton Academical | 1 | (0) |
| 2019–2020 | Needham Market | 0 | (0) |
| 2020–2024 | Chelmsford City | 35 | (0) |
| 2020 | → Heybridge Swifts (dual-registration) | 7 | (0) |
| 2024–2025 | Dartford | 33 | (0) |
| 2025– | Concord Rangers | 0 | (0) |
- * Club domestic league appearances and goals as of 17:10, 26 April 2025 (UTC)

Jacob Anthony Marsden (born 14 October 1996) is an English footballer who plays for concord Rangers as a goalkeeper.

== Career ==
Born in Great Yarmouth, Marsden played youth football for Ipswich Town, joining them in 2010, and spending a loan spell with Leiston, where he made 25 league appearances.

After being released by Ipswich he played in non-league football for St Ives Town and Mildenhall Town.

Marsden signed for Scottish club Hamilton Academical in August 2018. He left Hamilton in May 2019.

On 28 December 2019, Marsden signed for Southern League Premier Division Central side Needham Market.

On 25 September 2020, Chelmsford City announced the signing of Marsden, with Marsden being dual-registered with Heybridge Swifts upon his arrival at the club. On 9 April 2021, Chelmsford announced Marsden had signed a new one-year contract extension at the club. On 25 May 2023, Marsden signed another contract extension with Chelmsford, becoming the club's goalkeeping coach in the process.

On 16 May 2024, Marsden joined Dartford.

On 10 July 2025, Marsden joined Concord Rangers.

== Career statistics ==
As of 5 May 2025.

Appearances and goals by club, season and competition
| Club | Season | League | | | National Cup | | League Cup | | Other | | Total | |
| Club | Season | Division | Apps | Goals | Apps | Goals | Apps | Goals | Apps | Goals | Apps | Goals |
|---|---|---|---|---|---|---|---|---|---|---|---|---|
| Ipswich Town | 2016–17 | Championship | 0 | 0 | 0 | 0 | 0 | 0 | — | | 0 | 0 |
| Leiston (loan) | 2016–17 | Isthmian League; Premier Division | 25 | 0 | 0 | 0 | — | | 0 | 0 | 25 | 0 |
| St Ives Town | 2017–18 | Southern Football League; Premier Division | 3 | 0 | 0 | 0 | — | | 1 | 0 | 4 | 0 |
| Mildenhall Town | 2017–18 | Isthmian League; North Division | 9 | 0 | 0 | 0 | — | | 9 | 0 | 0 | 0 |
| Hamilton Academical | 2018–19 | Scottish Premiership | 1 | 0 | 0 | 0 | 0 | 0 | 1 (Note: Appearance in the Scottish Challenge Cup) | 0 | 2 | 0 |
| Needham Market | 2019–20 | Southern League; Premier Division Central | 0 | 0 | 0 | 0 | — | | 0 | 0 | 0 | 0 |
| Chelmsford City | 2020–21 | National League South | 0 | 0 | 0 | 0 | — | | 0 | 0 | 0 | 0 |
| Chelmsford City | 2021–22 | National League South | 25 | 0 | 1 | 0 | — | | 1 (Note: Appearance(s) in the FA Trophy) | 0 | 27 | 0 |
| Chelmsford City | 2022–23 | National League South | 6 | 0 | 0 | 0 | — | | 1 | 0 | 7 | 0 |
| Chelmsford City | 2023–24 | National League South | 4 | 0 | 0 | 0 | — | | 1 | 0 | 5 | 0 |
| Chelmsford City | Total | | 73 | 0 | 1 | 0 | 0 | 0 | 5 | 0 | 79 | 0 |
| Heybridge Swifts (dual registration) | 2020–21 | Isthmian North Division | 7 | 0 | 0 | 0 | — | | 2 | 0 | 9 | 0 |
| Dartford | 2024–25 | Isthmian League; Premier Division | 33 | 0 | 2 | 0 | — | | 5 (Note: One appearance in the FA Trophy, one appearance in the Kent Senior Cup, one appearance in the Velocity Cup, two appearances in the Isthmian Premier League Play-Offs) | 0 | 40 | 0 |
| Concord Rangers | 2025–26 | Isthmian League; North Division | 0 | 0 | 0 | 0 | — | | 0 | 0 | 0 | 0 |
| Career total | | | 113 | 0 | 3 | 0 | 0 | 0 | 12 | 0 | 128 | 0 |
