= James King (Scottish footballer) =

Scottish footballer (1906–1985)

Personal information
- Full name: James Munro King
- Date of birth: 16 April 1906
- Place of birth: Wishaw, Scotland
- Date of death: March 1985 (aged 78)
- Place of death: Law, Scotland
- Position: Outside forward

Youth career
- –: Carfin Harp

Senior career*
Years	Team	Apps	(Gls)
1928–1929	Carluke Rovers		
1929–1939	Hamilton Academical	265	(85)
1939	Alloa Athletic	0	(0)

International career
1932	Scottish League XI	1	(0)
1932–1933	Scotland	2	(1)
- * Club domestic league appearances and goals

James Munro King (16 April 1906 – March 1985) was a Scottish international footballer who spent the majority of his career with Hamilton Academical.

== Career ==
=== Early years ===
King was born in Craigneuk, Wishaw on 16 April 1906. He was introduced to Juvenile football with Carfin Harp by Robbie Donnelly (a lad from the same neighbourhood who was later a Partick Thistle and Manchester City player). While King was with them in 1928, they won every competition which the club participated except the Scottish Juvenile Cup. He could play equally well in either of the two extreme wing positions.

He also played for Carluke Rovers, and was chosen to play for the Lanarkshire Junior League versus the Forfar District League.

=== Hamilton Academical ===
Originally a provisional signing for Hamilton Academical by manager Willie McAndrew, he completed full signing forms on 3 June 1929.

He was chosen to represent the Scottish Alliance League to meet a Scottish Junior Select at Firhill on 18 April 1931. Initially operating on the left, the advantage of his two-footedness was put to use to accommodate Bobby Reid who took over the number 11 jersey with King crossing over to the right side.

He played in the 1935 Scottish Cup Final for Hamilton against Rangers. Improved terms were offered to him: £4 per week, an increase of £1. By 1937, Bobby Reid was on the left wing and King had moved to the right; that was his role when a crowd of 28,690 turned up at Douglas Park on a Wednesday afternoon on 3 March to witness a Scottish Cup tie with Heart of Midlothian.

At 5'8" and 10sts 2 lb, he was an able marksman as well with over 80 goals in his 262 League appearances for Hamilton. He was a tremendous servant to the Accies and remained with them until 1939, when Jimmy McStay took him to Alloa Athletic to assist in their efforts to stay in the top League. With only five games played, war broke out (those appearances were declared void) and at the age of 33, his career at the top level was at an end.

=== International ===
He earned a Scottish League XI place against the Irish League XI in 1933. This was eclipsed by his two full Scotland caps, both against Ireland, in 1932 and 1933; the result of the latter match was a home defeat, and King was one of five in the home team who were not selected for international duty again.

== Personal life ==
One of his sons, Johnny, played for Hamilton during the 1960s at centre forward. Another, Eddie, was signed by Hibernian while an inside left with Wishaw Juniors, while Jimmy Jr turned out as junior with Douglasdale Juniors, Bellshill Athletic and Royal Albert.

King died in March 1985 at the age of 79, after a long illness. His son Jimmy was present at a 'Hall of Fame' Dinner in February 2002 when his father was named as one of the four best ever Hamilton Academical players. Appropriately, he was known to the Accies support as "King James".
