= David Wilson (footballer, born 1908) =

English footballer

Personal information
- Date of birth: 17 December 1908
- Place of birth: Hebburn, England
- Date of death: 22 February 1992 (aged 83)
- Place of death: Glasgow, Scotland
- Height: 5 ft 9 in (1.75 m)
- Position: Centre forward

Youth career
- Hebburn Colliery

Senior career*
Years	Team	Apps	(Gls)
1928–1945	Hamilton Academical	329	(245)
–	Stranraer		
- * Club domestic league appearances and goals

David Wilson (17 December 1908 – 22 February 1992) was an English footballer who played for Hamilton Academical and Stranraer as a centre forward.

== Career ==
He finished as the top scorer in the Scottish Football League Division One in the 1936–37 season, with 34 goals. This remains the highest single-season total ever recorded for Hamilton Academical. He scored 246 league goals in 11 seasons prior to the Second World War (and over 400 in 17 years when all cups and unofficial wartime matches are counted), leading to him being described as the club's best ever player, and featured for Accies in the 1935 Scottish Cup Final which they lost 2–1 to Rangers.

Wilson was never selected for his native England, nor for the Scottish Football League XI despite his scoring feats in that competition. In June 1935 he toured North America with an SFA squad, scoring eleven times in six matches (all of which are considered unofficial by Scotland, although two appearances came against the USA, whose federation did regard the matches as official).

== See also ==
- List of footballers in Scotland by number of league goals (200+)
