= Willie Brownlie =

Scottish footballer (1882–1943)

Personal information
- Full name: William Hogg Brownlie
- Date of birth: 1882
- Place of birth: Hamilton, Scotland
- Date of death: 30 April 1943 (aged 60–61)
- Place of death: York County, Ontario, Canada
- Position: Left back

Senior career*
Years	Team	Apps	(Gls)
–	Strathclyde		
1904–1910	Hamilton Academical	163	(0)
–	Baracas		
–	Toronto Scottish		
1919–1921	Brooklyn Robins Dry Dock		
1921–1923	Toronto Scottish		
- * Club domestic league appearances and goals

William Hogg Brownlie (1882 – 30 April 1943) was a Scottish footballer who played as a left back.

His senior career in Scotland was spent solely with hometown club Hamilton Academical where he spent six full seasons and the first part of a seventh before emigrating to Canada. He won the minor Lanarkshire Cup on three occasions, but had left before any matches were played in the 1910–11 Scottish Cup in which the Accies reached the final.

Brownlie had some success playing in North America, winning the provincial Ontario Cup in 1918 and the United District Football League in 1919 with Toronto Scottish (where he was noted for his defensive partnership with Geordie Campbell) before being signed by American side Brooklyn Robins Dry Dock. There he won the American Cup in 1920 with a surprise win over the dominant team of the time, Bethlehem Steel, then the National Challenge Cup (later known as the U.S. Open Cup) in 1921, beating St. Louis Scullin Steel. By now a veteran in his late 30s, Brownlie then returned to Canada and Toronto Scottish, adding a Robertson Cup to his collection in 1922 (he was not involved in their further Ontario Cup finals of that period).
