= Wandsbeker TSV Concordia =

German football and sports club

- Full name: Wandsbeker Turn- und Sportverein Concordia von 1881 e.V.
- Founded: 27 March 2013
- Ground: Sportpark Hinschenfelde
- Capacity: 4500
- President: Matthias Seidel
- Head coach: Thomas Runge
- League: Oberliga Hamburg (V)
- 2025–26: Landesliga Hamburg-Hammonia, 1st of 18 (promoted)
Home colours	Away colours

Wandsbeker TSV Concordia is a German football and sports club from the Hamburg borough of Wandsbek.

== History ==
The club was founded on 27 March 2013 as a merger of SC Concordia von 1907 and TSV Wandsbek-Jenfeld 1881. Wandsbek-Jenfeld was founded in 2000 and it originated as a workers' club FTSV Wandsbek, later known as FWSV Wandsbek-Hinschenfelde, which was founded in 1881 and dissolved in 1933. The dissolved club's members joined Jenfelder SV Ost-Wandsbek which later changed name to SV Ost-Wandsbek 1913. On 25 April 2014 the merged club absorbed Wandsbek MTV 1872. The football section played in the Oberliga Nord, then one of the top divisions in German football, in 1947–53 and 1956–63.

The new club took over Concordia's place in the Landesliga Hansa (VI) and finished fourth in 2013–14. A runners-up finish in 2014–15 qualified it for promotion playoffs against the Landesliga Hammonia runners-up TuS Osdorf. Wandsbek lost the away leg 1-2 but succeeded at home 3–0, and promoted to the Oberliga Hamburg (V).

In the 2021–22 season, Concordia was the only Oberliga Hamburg team which applied for a spot in the Regionalliga Nord. After a draw against SV Todesfelde and defeats against Kickers Emden and Bremer SV, they finished 4th in the promotion play-offs and therefore stayed in the Oberliga.

== Other departments ==
The club also has other sections namely in handball, jujutsu, judo, karate, children's athletics, chess, tennis, and volleyball.
