= Delphin Tshiembe =

Congolese footballer (born 1991)

Personal information
- Full name: Delphin Dougie Jerk Tshiembe
- Date of birth: 7 December 1991 (age 34)
- Place of birth: Kinshasa, Zaire
- Height: 1.88 m (6 ft 2 in)
- Position: Centre-back

Team information
- Current team: FC ESPM

Youth career
- Copenhagen

Senior career*
Years	Team	Apps	(Gls)
2009–2010	KB		
2010–2012	Skjold		
2012–2013	HIK		
2013–2016	HB Køge	48	(3)
2016–2018	Horsens	66	(1)
2018–2019	Hamilton Academical	19	(0)
2020	HB Tórshavn	10	(1)
2021	HB Køge	5	(0)
2021	Vendsyssel	12	(0)
2022–2023	Fram Reykjavík	43	(2)
2024–	FC ESPM		
- * Club domestic league appearances and goals as of 10 November 2023

Delphin Dougie Jerk Tshiembe (born 7 December 1991) is a Congolese footballer who plays as a centre-back for FC ESPM.

== Club career ==
=== HB Køge ===
On 1 July 2013 it was confirmed that Tshiembe had signed a contract with HB Køge. He played his first match for the club on 25 July 2013 against Lyngby Boldklub. He played the whole match. In March 2014, Tshiembe suffered a bad knee injury, and was out for the rest of the season.

=== AC Horsens ===
On 27 January 2016 it was announced that Tshiembe had signed a contract with AC Horsens. He made his debut on 20 March 2016 against Vejle Boldklub. He played 68 minutes, before getting replaced by Jonas Gemmer in a 3–4 defeat in the Danish 1st Division.

=== Hamilton Academical ===
On 7 August 2018, Tshiembe signed for Scottish Premiership side Hamilton Academical. He left Hamilton in May 2019.

=== HB Tórshavn ===
On 27 February 2020, Tshiembe signed for Faroese club HB Tórshavn who had Danish former player Jens Berthel Askou as head coach. He left the club again at the end of 2020.

=== Return to HB Køge ===
On 28 April 2021, Tshiembe returned to HB Køge on a deal for the rest of the season. He left the club at the end of the season.

=== Vendsyssel FF ===
Left without contract, Tshiembe signed a deal with Vendsyssel FF on 22 July 2021. He left the club at the end of 2021, as his contract expired.

=== Fram Reykjavík ===
In April 2022, Tshiembe joined Icelandic club Fram Reykjavík. He left the club at the end of 2023.

=== FC ESPM ===
In 2024, Tshiembe played for Danish Series 2 (eight tier) club FC ESPM.
