= James Bulloch (footballer) =

Scottish footballer (1909–1992)

Personal information
- Full name: James Stewart Bulloch
- Date of birth: 23 October 1909
- Place of birth: Craigneuk, Scotland
- Date of death: 27 April 1992 (aged 82)
- Place of death: Lübeck, Germany
- Height: 5 ft 8 in (1.73 m)
- Position: Left back

Senior career*
Years	Team	Apps	(Gls)
- Law Scotia
1928	→ Albion Rovers (trial)	0	(0)
1929–1938	Hamilton Academical	231	(2)
1938	Morton	0	(0)
1938–1942	Alloa Athletic	34	(0)
1940–1941	→ Dumbarton (guest)	0	(0)
Total		265	(2)
- * Club domestic league appearances and goals

James Stewart Bulloch (23 October 1909 – 27 April 1992) was a Scottish footballer who played for Hamilton Academical, Alloa Athletic and Dumbarton, mainly at left back. He captained Hamilton in the 1935 Scottish Cup Final which they lost 2–1 to Rangers, then won promotion from the second tier in 1938–39 with Alloa after being recruited by former Accies teammate Jimmy McStay who had taken over as manager. Bulloch served in the Lothians and Border Horse regiment during World War II, and moved to Germany to coach football after the war ended. Bulloch was in 1948 and 1949 coach in the Netherlands at AGOVV winning the Eerste klasse oost and was third in Dutch championship 1948/49.
