= Dan Kelly (footballer) =

Scottish footballer

Personal information
- Full name: Daniel Kelly
- Date of birth: 14 October 1899
- Place of birth: Blantyre, Scotland
- Date of death: 24 August 1941 (aged 41)
- Place of death: Glasgow, Scotland
- Height: 5 ft 8 1/2 in (1.74 m)
- Positions: Inside forward; outside forward

Senior career*
Years	Team	Apps	(Gls)
1923–1924	Blantyre Victoria		
1924–1927	Hamilton Academical	50	(15)
1927–1928	Derby County	5	(0)
1928–1930	Torquay United	53	(13)
1930–1932	York City	48	(12)
1932–1935	Doncaster Rovers	13	(4)
1935–1936	Dundalk		
- Clapton Orient
Total		169	(41)
- * Club domestic league appearances and goals

Daniel Kelly (14 October 1899 – 24 August 1941) was a Scottish professional footballer who played as a forward in Scottish football for Blantyre Victoria and Hamilton Academical, in the Football League for Derby County, Torquay United, York City and Doncaster Rovers, in Irish football for Dundalk and was on the books of Clapton Orient without making a league appearance.

== Life ==
Kelly was born in Blantyre, South Lanarkshire to Daniel and Catherine (née Carabine). His father died five months before his birth. His maternal first cousin was the footballer Jimmy Carabine. He married Catherine Devlin at St Joseph's Church, Blantyre on 7 January 1931 and he remained a well respected member of the community in Blantyre following the end of his career. He died on 24 August 1941 aged 41 at Glasgow Royal Infirmary. His final occupation was a spirit salesman.
