= 1910–11 Scottish Cup =

Tournament details
- Country: Scotland

Final positions
- Champions: Celtic
- Runners-up: Hamilton Academical

The 1910–11 Scottish Cup was the 38th staging of Scotland's most prestigious football knockout competition. The Cup was won by Celtic who defeated Hamilton Academical 2–0 in the replayed final, after drawing 0–0.

== Calendar ==
Round	First match date	Fixtures	Clubs
First Round	28 January 1911	16	32 → 16
Second Round	11 February 1911	8	16 → 8
Quarter-finals	25 February 1911	4	8 → 4
Semi-finals	11 March 1911	2	4 → 2
Final	8 April 1911	1	2 → 1

== First round ==
Home team	Score	Away team
Aberdeen	3 – 0	Brechin City
Airdrieonians	2 – 0	Bo'ness
Annbank	0 – 5	Motherwell
Celtic	2 – 0	St Mirren
Dundee	2 – 1	Hibernian
East Stirlingshire	1 – 4	Morton
Forfar Athletic	3 – 0	5th KOSB
Galston	8 – 0	Lochgelly United
Heart of Midlothian	1 – 1	Clyde
Inverness Thistle	0 – 1	Johnstone
Leith Athletic	2 – 2	Falkirk
Nithsdale Wanderers	3 – 1	Caledonian
Partick Thistle	7 – 2	St Bernard's
Rangers	2 – 1	Kilmarnock
Stanley	1 – 6	Queen's Park
Third Lanark	0 – 1	Hamilton Academical

=== Replays ===
Home team	Score	Away team
Clyde	1 – 0	Heart of Midlothian
Falkirk	4 – 1	Leith Athletic

== Second round ==
Home team	Score	Away team
Aberdeen	1 – 0	Airdrieonians
Celtic	1 – 0	Galston
Clyde	4 – 1	Queen's Park
Forfar Athletic	2 – 0	Falkirk
Hamilton Academical	1 – 1	Johnstone
Morton	0 – 3	Rangers
Motherwell	0 – 0	Nithsdale Wanderers
Partick Thistle	0 – 3	Dundee

=== Replays ===
Home team	Score	Away team
Johnstone	1 – 3	Hamilton Academical
Motherwell	1 – 0	Nithsdale Wanderers

== Quarter-finals ==
25 February 1911

Aberdeen	6–0	Forfar Athletic
	Report

Pittodrie Stadium, Aberdeen
Attendance: 10,000

25 February 1911

Celtic	1–0	Clyde
	Report

Celtic Park, Glasgow
Attendance: 50,000

25 February 1911

Dundee	2–1	Rangers
	Report

Dens Park, Dundee
Attendance: 30,000

4 March 1911

Hamilton Academical	2–1	Motherwell
	Report

Douglas Park, Hamilton
Attendance: 18,000

== Semi-finals ==
11 March 1911

Celtic	1–0	Aberdeen
	Report

Celtic Park, Glasgow
Attendance: 48,000

11 March 1911

Hamilton Academical	3–2	Dundee
	Report

Douglas Park, Hamilton
Attendance: 15,000

== Final ==
8 April 1911

Celtic	0–0	Hamilton Academical
	Report

Ibrox Park, Govan
Attendance: 45,000
Referee: T. Dougray

=== Replay ===
15 April 1911

Celtic	2–0	Hamilton Academical
Quinn 80'; McAteer 90'	Report

Ibrox Park, Govan
Attendance: 25,000
Referee: T. Dougray

=== Teams ===
Celtic:
GK	Davey Adams
RB	Alec McNair
LB	Jimmy Hay
RH	James Young
CH	Tom McAteer
LH	Joe Dodds
OR	Andrew McAtee
IR	Jimmy McMenemy
CF	Jimmy Quinn
IL	John Hastie
OL	Davie Hamilton
Replay:	Willie Kivlichan replaced Hastie

Hamilton:
GK	Jimmy Watson
RB	John Davie
LB	Adam Miller
RH	Philip Watson
CH	Willie McLaughlin
LH	Matt Eglinton
OR	John McLaughlin
IR	John Waugh
CF	Willie Hunter
IL	Johnny Hastie
OL	Bob McNeil
Replay:	Unchanged

== See also ==
- 1910–11 in Scottish football
