= Jimmy Morgan (footballer, born 1912) =

Scottish footballer

Personal information
- Full name: James Morgan
- Date of birth: 1912
- Place of birth: Waterside, Scotland
- Date of death: 31 July 1944 (aged 32)
- Place of death: North Atlantic Ocean
- Height: 5 ft 8 in (1.73 m)
- Position: Goalkeeper

Senior career*
Years	Team	Apps	(Gls)
–	Springburn United		
–	Arthurlie		
1932–1941	Hamilton Academical	156	(0)
- * Club domestic league appearances and goals

James Morgan (1912 – 31 July 1944) was a Scottish footballer who played for Hamilton Academical as a goalkeeper.

Born in Waterside, Ayrshire (between Dalmellington and Patna) but raised in Barrhead, he joined Accies from Arthurlie in 1932. He became an important member of the team during a period when they consistently finished in the top half of the Scottish Football League's top division. His breakthrough came when injuries to Eddie Wright and then Peter Shevlin cleared a path for him to play in the 1935 Scottish Cup Final (his first-ever appearance in the competition), where he saved a penalty and made several other impressive stops, although opponents Rangers won the trophy. He was later the reserve goalkeeper for the Scottish Football League XI on two occasions.

Morgan joined the Royal Air Force during World War II, rising to the rank of Flight Lieutenant. He was killed in July 1944, aged 32, when his aircraft crashed in the North Atlantic Ocean off Trevose Head, Cornwall while returning from a routine patrol. He is commemorated at the Air Forces Memorial (Runnymede) and in a small plaque at the New Douglas Park stadium, along with John Thomson, a teammate who also died in the conflict (coincidentally, a day earlier in an unrelated incident).

== See also ==
- List of footballers killed during World War II
