= Daniel Kelly (footballer, born 1893) =

Scottish footballer

Personal information
- Full name: Daniel Crossan Kelly
- Date of birth: 1893
- Place of birth: Motherwell, Scotland
- Date of death: 11 January 1948 (aged 54–55)
- Place of death: Govan, Scotland
- Position: Centre forward

Senior career*
| Years | Team | Apps | (Gls) |
| – | Bedlay Juniors | | |
| 1913–1919 | Hamilton Academical | 159 | (64) |
| 1918 | → Clyde (loan) | 3 | (3) |
| 1919–1922 | Motherwell | 13 | (3) |
| 1920 | → Bathgate (loan) | | |
| 1920–1922 | → Bo'ness (loan) | | |
| Total | | 175 | (70) |
- * Club domestic league appearances and goals

Daniel Crossan Kelly (1893 – 11 January 1948) was a Scottish footballer who played mainly as a centre forward for Hamilton Academical, Clyde and Motherwell. He was Hamilton's leading goalscorer for most of the World War I period (the Scottish Football League continued to operate during the conflict). He later played for Bathgate and Bo'ness who at that time were members of the Central Football League outwith the SFL.
