= Dougie Wallace (soccer) =

South African soccer player (1919–1999)

Personal information
- Full name: Douglas Herbert Wallace
- Date of birth: 20 February 1919
- Place of birth: Krugersdorp, Union of South Africa
- Date of death: 25 September 1999 (aged 80)
- Place of death: Sefton, England
- Position: Centre forward

Senior career*
Years	Team	Apps	(Gls)
1938–1946	Clyde	38	(16)
1946–1947	Dunfermline Athletic	16	(12)
1947–1949	Albion Rovers		
1949–1954	Llanelly		

International career
1941–1943	Scotland (wartime)	3	(2)
1941	Scottish League XI	1	(1)

Managerial career
- Llanelly
- * Club domestic league appearances and goals

Douglas Herbert Wallace (20 February 1919 – 25 September 1999) was a South African professional footballer who played as a centre forward in the Scottish Football League for Clyde, Dunfermline Athletic and Albion Rovers, and was a player and coach of Llanelly in England's Southern Football League.

== Career ==
=== Club ===
Born and raised in South Africa (Krugersdorp, Transvaal Province) in a family of Scottish origin, as a teenager Wallace featured for a local side against the Aberdeen squad that was touring the country in 1937, managed by Paddy Travers. A year later, Travers became Clyde boss and soon invited the player over to sign for his new club. The move was successful: Wallace (playing at inside left to accommodate Willie Martin) opened the scoring in the 1939 Scottish Cup Final, a 4–0 win over Motherwell which secured the trophy for the first time in Clyde history. He is also one of a small group of players to have scored four goals in a match for the Bully Wee.

World War II then intervened, with Wallace playing for Clyde in unofficial competitions throughout its duration. In May 1943, he turned out for Hibernian in the Rosebery Charity Cup; in what seems to be his only full appearance for the Edinburgh side, he scored Hibs' goal but the trophy was won by rivals Heart of Midlothian on the toss of a coin (he had also scored in the first attempt to play the match, which was abandoned).

After the conflict ended, in 1946 Wallace moved to Dunfermline Athletic, then in late 1947 signed for Albion Rovers, helping the Coatbridge club to gain promotion to the top tier. The subsequent 1948–49 Scottish Division One campaign ended in relegation with only eight points collected, but remains a significant point in Rovers' history as the last time they played among the nation's elite. In one of his final appearances, Wallace scored the consolation goal in a 4–1 defeat to Rangers which meant that the Gers won the championship after title rivals Dundee unexpectedly lost. There were some high points in the season, which included remarkable back-to-back league comebacks. Firstly, Rovers trailed 1–4 at Easter Road to reigning champions Hibs; Wallace scored the first of three Rovers goals in the last ten minutes and the game ended in a 4–4 draw. In the next match, Rovers were 1–3 down to Celtic at home with nine minutes left. Having already netted the first goal for his side, Wallace scored the equalizer on 85 minutes to secure a 3–3 draw.

Appointed as player-coach in August 1949, Wallace accepted an offer from Llanelly, a lower-league club from Wales with ambitions to become full members of the Football League. Joining as a player-coach under Jack Goldsborough, Wallace played a large part in persuading former Albion Rovers teammate Jock Stein to join the club. However, having been promoted to the Southern League, Llanelly were unsuccessful in their Football League applications and their fortunes declined as investment and interest in the project waned. Wallace also served a period as Llanelly manager.

=== International ===
Despite his birthplace, Wallace made three appearances for Scotland in unofficial wartime fixtures, scoring a brace in a 3–2 win over England in February 1941; however the other two caps were in defeats to the same opposition. In the last of these, a 4–0 loss at Hampden Park, Wallace reacted to rough treatment from England captain Stan Cullis by grabbing the defender by the groin. The referee took no action at the time, but the SFA decided afterwards that Wallace would not be considered for internationals again.

He had also been selected by the Scottish Football League XI in 1941 (the representative match was arranged for the benefit of the RAF Benevolent Fund even though the league itself had been suspended) and was among the scorers again, albeit in a 3–2 defeat by The Football League XI.

== Personal life ==
His son Gordon – born in Scotland, raised in Wales – also became a footballer, playing in England for Liverpool and Crewe Alexandra.

He died in 1999 in Merseyside, England.

== Honours ==
Clyde

- Scottish Cup: 1938–39
- Paisley Charity Cup: 1939, 1940

Albion Rovers

- Scottish B Division: promotion 1947–48
