= 1938–39 Celtic F.C. season =

Celtic
1938–39 season
- Manager: Willie Maley
- Stadium: Celtic Park
- Scottish First Division: 2nd
- Scottish Cup: 4th Round

During the 1938–39 Scottish football season, Celtic competed in the Scottish First Division.

== Competitions ==
=== Scottish First Division ===
==== League table ====
Pos	Team	Pld	W	D	L	GF	GA	GD	Pts
1	Rangers	38	25	9	4	112	55	+57	59
2	Celtic	38	20	8	10	99	53	+46	48
3	Aberdeen	38	20	6	12	91	61	+30	46
4	Heart of Midlothian	38	20	5	13	98	70	+28	45
5	Falkirk	38	19	7	12	73	63	+10	45

Source: RSSSF

==== Matches ====
13 August 1938 Division One	Celtic	9–1	Kilmarnock	Glasgow
				Stadium: Celtic Park; Attendance: 15,000

20 August 1938 Division One	Hamilton Academical	0–1	Celtic	Hamilton
				Stadium: Douglas Park; Attendance: 15,000

24 August 1938 Division One	Kilmarnock	0–0	Celtic	Kilmarnock
				Stadium: Rugby Park; Attendance: 20,000

27 August 1938 Division One	Celtic	1–2	Aberdeen	Glasgow
				Stadium: Celtic Park; Attendance: 23,000

3 September 1938 Division One	Hearts	1–5	Celtic	Edinburgh
				Stadium: Tynecastle Park; Attendance: 49,905

10 September 1938 Division One	Celtic	6–2	Rangers	Glasgow
				Stadium: Celtic Park; Attendance: 74,500

14 September 1938 Division One	Celtic	1–2	Hamilton Academical	Glasgow
				Stadium: Celtic Park; Attendance: 6,000

17 September 1938 Division One	Clyde	1–4	Celtic	Glasgow
				Stadium: Shawfield Stadium; Attendance: 30,000

24 September 1938 Division One	Celtic	6–1	Raith Rovers	Glasgow
				Stadium: Celtic Park; Attendance: 6,000

1 October 1938 Division One	Albion Rovers	1–8	Celtic	Coatbridge
				Stadium: Cliftonhill; Attendance: 10,000

12 October 1938 Division One	Celtic	5–1	Queen of the South	Glasgow
				Stadium: Celtic Park; Attendance: 12,000

22 October 1938 Division One	Partick Thistle	0–0	Celtic	Glasgow
				Stadium: Firhill Park; Attendance: 25,000

29 October 1938 Division One	Celtic	6–1	Third Lanark	Glasgow
				Stadium: Celtic Park; Attendance: 8,000

5 November 1938 Division One	Celtic	3–3	Ayr United	Glasgow
				Stadium: Celtic Park; Attendance: 12,000

12 November 1938 Division One	Falkirk	1–1	Celtic	Falkirk
				Stadium: Brockville Park; Attendance: 8,000

19 November 1938 Division One	Celtic	1–3	Motherwell	Glasgow
				Stadium: Celtic Park; Attendance: 10,000

26 November 1938 Division One	Arbroath	0–2	Celtic	Arbroath
				Stadium: Gayfield Park; Attendance: 5,000

3 December 1938 Division One	Celtic	5–4	Hibernian	Glasgow
				Stadium: Celtic Park; Attendance: 20,000

10 December 1938 Division One	St Johnstone	1–1	Celtic	Perth
				Stadium: Muirton Park; Attendance: 12,000

17 December 1938 Division One	Celtic	3–2	St Mirren	Glasgow
				Stadium: Celtic Park; Attendance: 8,000

24 December 1938 Division One	Aberdeen	3–1	Celtic	Aberdeen
				Stadium: Pittodrie Park; Attendance: 23,000

31 December 1938 Division One	Celtic	2–2	Hearts	Glasgow
				Stadium: Celtic Park; Attendance: 50,466

2 January 1939 Division One	Rangers	2–1	Celtic	Glasgow
				Stadium: Ibrox Park; Attendance: 118,567

3 January 1939 Division One	Celtic	0–1	Queen's Park	Glasgow
				Stadium: Celtic Park; Attendance: 6,000

7 January 1939 Division One	Raith Rovers	4–0	Celtic	Kirkcaldy
				Stadium: Stark's Park; Attendance: 15,000

25 January 1939 Division One	Celtic	4–1	Albion Rovers	Glasgow
				Stadium: Celtic Park; Attendance: 4,000

28 January 1939 Division One	Queen of the South	1–1	Celtic	Dumfries
				Stadium: Palmerston Park; Attendance: 11,000

11 February 1939 Division One	Celtic	3–1	Clyde	Glasgow
				Stadium: Celtic Park; Attendance: 8,000

25 February 1939 Division One	Celtic	3–1	Partick Thistle	Glasgow
				Stadium: Celtic Park; Attendance: 12,000

8 March 1939 Division One	Third Lanark	0–2	Celtic	Glasgow
				Stadium: Cathkin Park; Attendance: 10,000

11 March 1939 Division One	Ayr United	1–4	Celtic	Ayr
				Stadium: Somerset Park; Attendance: 8,000

18 March 1939 Division One	Celtic	1–2	Falkirk	Glasgow
				Stadium: Celtic Park; Attendance: 15,000

1 April 1939 Division One	Celtic	2–0	Arbroath	Glasgow
				Stadium: Celtic Park; Attendance: 7,000

5 April 1939 Division One	Motherwell	2–3	Celtic	Motherwell
				Stadium: Fir Park; Attendance: 4,000

8 April 1939 Division One	Hibernian	1–0	Celtic	Edinburgh
				Stadium: Easter Road; Attendance: 12,000

10 April 1939 Division One	Queen's Park	1–2	Celtic	Glasgow
				Stadium: Hampden Park; Attendance: 17,026

22 April 1939 Division One	Celtic	1–1	St Johnstone	Glasgow
				Stadium: Celtic Park; Attendance: 5,000

29 April 1939 Division One	St Mirren	2–1	Celtic	Paisley
				Stadium: St Mirren Park, Love Street; Attendance: 17,000

=== Scottish Cup ===
21 January 1939 First round	Burntisland Shipyard	3–8	Celtic	Burntisland
				Stadium: Kirkton Park; Attendance: 1,427

4 February 1939 Second round	Montrose	1–7	Celtic	Montrose
				Stadium: Links Park; Attendance: 6,389

18 February 1939 Third round	Hearts	2–2	Celtic	Edinburgh
				Stadium: Tynecastle Park; Attendance: 50,498

22 February 1939 Third round replay	Celtic	2–1	Hearts	Glasgow
				Stadium: Celtic Park; Attendance: 80,840

4 March 1939 Fourth round	Motherwell	3–1	Celtic	Motherwell
				Stadium: Fir Park; Attendance: 31,000
