= 1938–39 Heart of Midlothian F.C. season =

Heart of Midlothian
1938–39 season
- Manager: Frank Moss
- Stadium: Tynecastle Park
- Scottish First Division: 4th
- Scottish Cup: Round 3

During the 1938–39 season Hearts competed in the Scottish First Division, the Scottish Cup and the East of Scotland Shield.

== Fixtures ==
=== Friendlies ===
1 August 1938 Practice Match	Hearts	6–2	Heart of Midlothian "A"	Tynecastle Park

5 August 1938 Practice Match	Hearts	5–2	Heart of Midlothian "A"	Tynecastle Park

25 March 1939 Friendly	Middlesbrough	1–4	Hearts	Ayresome Park

=== Wilson Cup ===
17 August 1938 Final	Hearts	2–0	Hibernian	Tynecastle Park

=== East of Scotland Shield ===
7 September 1938 Semi-Final	Hearts	5–3	Leith Athletic	Tynecastle Park

15 April 1939 Final	Hearts	1–3	Hibernian	Tynecastle Park

=== Rosebery Charity Cup ===
3 May 1939 Semi-Final	Hearts	5–2	St Bernard's	Tynecastle Park

13 May 1939 Final	Hearts	0–2	Leith Athletic	Tynecastle Park

=== Scottish Cup ===
21 January 1939 Scottish Cup R1	Hearts	14–2	Penicuik Athletic	Tynecastle Park
				Attendance: 12,620

4 February 1939 Scottish Cup R2	Hearts	14–1	Elgin City	Tynecastle Park
				Attendance: 7,857

18 February 1939 Scottish Cup R3	Hearts	2–2	Celtic	Tynecastle Park
				Attendance: 50,498

22 February 1939 Scottish Cup R3 Replay	Celtic	2–1	Hearts	Celtic Park
				Attendance: 80,840

=== Scottish First Division ===
13 August 1938 Scottish First Division	Third Lanark	1–4	Hearts	Cathkin Park
				Attendance: 18,000

20 August 1939 Scottish First Division	Hearts	6–2	Falkirk	Tynecastle Park
				Attendance: 32,070

24 August 1939 Scottish First Division	Hearts	4–1	Third Lanark	Tynecastle Park
				Attendance: 20,137

27 August 1939 Scottish First Division	Partick Thistle	3–1	Hearts	Firhill Park
				Attendance: 20,000

3 September 1938 Scottish First Division	Hearts	1–5	Celtic	Tynecastle Park
				Attendance: 49,905

10 September 1938 Scottish First Division	Hibernian	4–0	Hearts	Easter Road
				Attendance: 30,000

13 September 1938 Scottish First Division	Falkirk	0–1	Hearts	Brockville Park
				Attendance: 8,000

17 September 1938 Scottish First Division	Hearts	4–0	Motherwell	Tynecastle Park
				Attendance: 17,181

24 September 1938 Scottish First Division	Ayr United	3–1	Hearts	Somerset Park
				Attendance: 9,000

1 October 1938 Scottish First Division	Hearts	5–2	St Mirren	Tynecastle Park
				Attendance: 11,687

8 October 1938 Scottish First Division	St Johnstone	1–7	Hearts	Muirton Park
				Attendance: 6,000

15 October 1938 Scottish First Division	Hearts	1–1	Arbroath	Tynecastle Park
				Attendance: 14,7333

22 October 1938 Scottish First Division	Hearts	5–2	Aberdeen	Tynecastle Park
				Attendance: 19,907

29 October 1938 Scottish First Division	Queen's Park	4–1	Hearts	Hampden Park
				Attendance: 11,487

5 November 1938 Scottish First Division	Queen of the South	0–1	Hearts	Palmerston Park
				Attendance: 7,000

12 November 1938 Scottish First Division	Hearts	1–3	Rangers	Tynecastle Park
				Attendance: 38,592

19 November 1938 Scottish First Division	Albion Rovers	0–1	Hearts	Cliftonhill
				Attendance: 6,000

26 November 1938 Scottish First Division	Raith Rovers	1–2	Hearts	Stark's Park
				Attendance: 12,000

3 December 1938 Scottish First Division	Hearts	2–1	Kilmarnock	Tynecastle Park
				Attendance: 16,337

10 December 1939 Scottish First Division	Clyde	2–6	Hearts	Shawfield Stadium
				Attendance: 12,000

17 December 1938 Scottish First Division	Hearts	2–3	Hamilton Academical	Tynecastle Park
				Attendance: 20,409

24 December 1938 Scottish First Division	Hearts	5–0	Partick Thistle	Tynecastle Park
				Attendance: 9,904

31 December 1938 Scottish First Division	Celtic	2–2	Hearts	Celtic Park
				Attendance: 50,446

2 January 1939 Scottish First Division	Hearts	0–1	Hibernian	Tynecastle Park
				Attendance: 45,061

3 January 1939 Scottish First Division	Arbroath	1–1	Hearts	Gayfield Park
				Attendance: 6,000

11 January 1939 Scottish First Division	Hearts	2–0	Ayr United	Tynecastle Park
				Attendance: 6,400

24 January 1939 Scottish First Division	St Mirren	2–1	Hearts	St Mirren Park, Love Street
				Attendance: 5,000

28 January 1939 Scottish First Division	Hearts	8–2	St Johnstone	Tynecastle Park
				Attendance: 9,740

11 February 1939 Scottish First Division	Motherwell	4–2	Hearts	Fir Park
				Attendance: 12,000

25 February 1939 Scottish First Division	Aberdeen	4–3	Hearts	Pittodrie Park
				Attendance: 19,000

4 March 1939 Scottish First Division	Hearts	8–3	Queen's Park	Tynecastle Park
				Attendance: 8,245

11 March 1939 Scottish First Division	Hearts	1–2	Queen of the South	Tynecastle Park
				Attendance: 7,491

18 March 1939 Scottish First Division	Rangers	1–1	Hearts	Ibrox Park
				Attendance: 40,000

29 March 1939 Scottish First Division	Hearts	2–0	Albion Rovers	Tynecastle Park
				Attendance: 7,091

1 April 1939 Scottish First Division	Hearts	2–1	Raith Rovers	Tynecastle Park
				Attendance: 9,918

8 April 1939 Scottish First Division	Kilmarnock	4–1	Hearts	Rugby Park
				Attendance: 6,000

26 April 1939 Scottish First Division	Hearts	2–0	Clyde	Tynecastle Park
				Attendance: 7,091

29 April 1939 Scottish First Division	Hamilton Academical	4–1	Hearts	Douglas Park
				Attendance: 2,000

== See also ==
- List of Heart of Midlothian F.C. seasons
