= Mathie =

Mathie is a surname. Notable people with the surname include:

- Alex Mathie (born 1968), Scottish football player and manager
- Davie Mathie (1919–1954), Scottish football player
- Marion Mathie (1925–2012), English actress
- Ross Mathie (born 1946), Scottish football player and coach
- Scott Mathie (born 1983), South African rugby union player
