= History of Motherwell FC (1886–1945) =

Scottish football club history

This article charts the history of Motherwell F.C. from their foundation in 1886 to the end of the Second World War.

== 1886-1887 ==
Manager: Committee

=== Scottish Cup ===
First Qualifying Round

11 September 1886

Cambuslang	6–1	Motherwell

== 1887-1888 ==
Manager: Committee

=== Scottish Cup ===
First Qualifying Round

3 September 1887

Drumpellier	2–3	Motherwell

10 September 1887

Motherwell	2–0	Drumpellier

Second Qualifying Round

24 September 1887

Carfin Shamrock	3–1	Motherwell

== 1888-1889 ==
Manager: Committee

=== Scottish Cup ===
First Qualifying Round

1 September 1888

Motherwell	3–3	Royal Albert

Replay

8 September 1888

Royal Albert	1–2	Motherwell

Second Qualifying Round

22 September 1888

Motherwell	5–1	Hamilton Academical

Third Qualifying Round

13 October 1888

Motherwell	2–6	Dumbarton

== 1889-1890 ==
Manager: Committee

=== Scottish Cup ===
First Qualifying Round

7 September 1889

Airdriehill	5–6	Motherwell

Second Qualifying Round

28 September 1889

Carfin Shamrock	6–2	Motherwell

== 1890-1891 ==
Manager: Committee

=== Scottish Cup ===
First Qualifying Round

6 September 1890

Royal Albert	5–4	Motherwell

== 1891-1892 ==
Manager: Committee

=== Scottish Football Federation ===
Pos	Team	Pld	W	D	L	GF	GA	PTS
1	Arthurlie	22	16	3	3	107	38	35
2	Albion Rovers	22	15	1	6	88	51	31
3	Hurlford	22	11	4	7	58	51	26
4	Falkirk	21	11	3	7	61	49	25
5	Wishaw Thistle	22	10	4	8	69	71	24
6	Pollokshaws	22	10	2	10	73	58	22
7	Royal Albert	22	10	1	11	70	54	21
8	Kilmarnock Athletic	22	7	3	12	51	67	17
9	Clydebank	22	7	3	12	46	87	17
10	Glasgow Wanderers	22	7	2	13	44	88	16
11	Burnbank Swifts	21	4	6	11	49	80	14
12	Motherwell	22	4	6	12	58	80	14

Pos	Team	Pld	W	D	L	GF	GA	PTS
1	Royal Albert	18	11	5	2	66	36	27
2	Motherwell	18	11	3	4	77	46	25
3	Arthurlie	18	10	3	5	55	36	23
4	Neilston	18	10	3	5	40	28	23
5	Albion Rovers	18	8	3	7	66	52	19
6	Wishaw Thistle	18	8	1	9	55	39	17
7	East Stirlingshire	18	6	3	9	49	68	15
8	Falkirk	18	6	3	9	46	66	15
9	Pollokshaws	18	7	1	10	58	52	14
10	Clydebank	18	0	1	17	18	107	1

=== Scottish Cup ===
First Qualifying Round

5 September 1891

Motherwell	1–4	Cowdenbeath

== 1892-1893 ==
Manager: Committee

=== Scottish Football Federation ===
Pos	Team	Pld	W	D	L	GF	GA	PTS
1	Arthurlie	22	16	3	3	107	38	35
2	Albion Rovers	22	15	1	6	88	51	31
3	Hurlford	22	11	4	7	58	51	26
4	Falkirk	21	11	3	7	61	49	25
5	Wishaw Thistle	22	10	4	8	69	71	24
6	Pollokshaws	22	10	2	10	73	58	22
7	Royal Albert	22	10	1	11	70	54	21
8	Kilmarnock Athletic	22	7	3	12	51	67	17
9	Clydebank	22	7	3	12	46	87	17
10	Glasgow Wanderers	22	7	2	13	44	88	16
11	Burnbank Swifts	21	4	6	11	49	80	14
12	Motherwell	22	4	6	12	58	80	14

Pos	Team	Pld	W	D	L	GF	GA	PTS
1	Royal Albert	18	11	5	2	66	36	27
2	Motherwell	18	11	3	4	77	46	25
3	Arthurlie	18	10	3	5	55	36	23
4	Neilston	18	10	3	5	40	28	23
5	Albion Rovers	18	8	3	7	66	52	19
6	Wishaw Thistle	18	8	1	9	55	39	17
7	East Stirlingshire	18	6	3	9	49	68	15
8	Falkirk	18	6	3	9	46	66	15
9	Pollokshaws	18	7	1	10	58	52	14
10	Clydebank	18	0	1	17	18	107	1

=== Scottish Cup ===
First Qualifying Round

26 November 1892

Motherwell	9–2	Campsie

Replay – The game was replayed after Campsie complained about the dimensions of the pitch.

17 December 1892

Motherwell	6–4	Campsie

Second Qualifying Round

24 December 1892

Motherwell	2–4	Heart of Midlothian

=== Other Honours ===
Lanarkshire Express Cup winners
Airdrie Charity Cup winners

== 1893-1894 ==
Manager: Committee

=== Scottish Second Division ===
Pos	Team	Pld	W	D	L	GF	GA	GD	Pts	Qualification or relegation
1	Hibernian (C)	18	13	3	2	83	29	+54	29	
2	Cowlairs	18	13	1	4	72	32	+40	27	
3	Clyde (P)	18	11	2	5	51	36	+15	24	Elected to 1894–95 Scottish Division One
4	Motherwell	18	11	1	6	61	46	+15	23	
5	Partick Thistle	18	10	0	8	56	58	−2	20	
6	Port Glasgow Athletic	18	9	2	7	52	52	0	13 (Note: Port Glasgow Athletic were deducted 7 points for fielding an ineligible player.)	
7	Abercorn	18	5	2	11	42	60	−18	12	
8	Morton	18	4	1	13	36	62	−26	9	Re-elected
8	Northern	18	3	3	12	29	66	−37	9	Not re-elected (Note: Northern were not re-elected and Thistle did not apply for re-election. Dundee Wanderers and Airdrieonians were elected in their place.)
10	Thistle	18	2	3	13	31	72	−41	7	Did not apply for re-election

Updated to match(es) played on May 2013. Source: statto.com, SFHA
Rules for classification: Teams finish equal if level on points. Points system: 2 points for a win, 1 point for a draw, 0 points for a loss.
(C) Champions; (P) Promoted

== 1894-1895 ==
Manager: Committee

=== Scottish Second Division ===
Pos	Team	Pld	W	D	L	GF	GA	GD	Pts	Promotion or relegation
1	Hibernian (C, P)	18	14	2	2	92	28	+64	30	Promoted to the 1895–96 Scottish First Division
2	Motherwell	18	10	2	6	56	39	+17	22	
3	Port Glasgow Athletic	18	8	4	6	62	56	+6	20	
3	Renton	17	10	0	7	46	44	+2	20	
5	Morton	18	9	1	8	59	63	−4	19	
6	Abercorn	18	7	4	7	51	65	−14	18	
6	Airdrieonians	18	8	2	8	68	45	+23	18	
8	Partick Thistle	18	7	3	8	50	62	−12	17	
9	Dundee Wanderers (R)	17	3	1	13	44	86	−42	9 (Note: Renton failed to turn up for a fixture against Dundee Wanderers. Two points were awarded to Dundee Wanderers.)	Resigned (Note: Both Dundee Wanderers and Cowlairs resigned from the league at the end of the season.)
10	Cowlairs (R)	18	2	3	13	37	77	−40	7	Resigned

Source: statto.com
Rules for classification: Teams finish equal if level on points. Points system: 2 points for a win, 1 point for a draw, 0 points for a loss
(C) Champions; (P) Promoted; (R) Relegated

=== Other Honours ===
Lanarkshire Cup winners

== 1895-1896 ==
Manager: Committee

=== Scottish Second Division ===
Pos	Team	Pld	W	D	L	GF	GA	GD	Pts	Promotion or relegation
1	Abercorn (C, P)	18	12	3	3	55	31	+24	27	Promoted to the 1896–97 Scottish First Division
2	Leith Athletic	18	11	1	6	55	37	+18	23	
3	Kilmarnock	18	10	1	7	51	46	+5	21	
3	Renton	18	9	3	6	40	28	+12	21	
5	Airdrieonians	18	7	4	7	48	44	+4	18	
5	Partick Thistle	18	8	2	8	46	54	−8	18	
7	Port Glasgow Athletic	18	6	4	8	40	41	−1	16	
8	Motherwell	18	5	3	10	31	52	−21	13	
9	Morton	18	4	4	10	32	42	−10	12	
10	Linthouse	18	5	1	12	26	49	−23	11	

Source: statto.com
Rules for classification: Teams finish equal if level on points. Points system: 2 points for a win, 1 point for a draw, 0 points for a loss.
(C) Champions; (P) Promoted

== 1896-1897 ==
Manager: Committee

=== Scottish Second Division ===
Pos	Team	Pld	W	D	L	GF	GA	GD	Pts	Promotion or relegation
1	Partick Thistle (C, P)	18	14	3	1	61	28	+33	31	Promoted to the 1897–98 Scottish First Division
2	Leith Athletic	18	13	1	4	55	27	+28	27	
3	Airdrieonians	18	10	1	7	49	39	+10	21	
3	Kilmarnock	18	10	1	7	44	33	+11	21	
5	Morton	18	7	2	9	38	40	−2	16	
6	Linthouse	18	8	2	8	44	53	−9	14 (Note: Linthouse were docked four points.)	
6	Renton	18	6	2	10	34	41	−7	14	
8	Motherwell	18	6	1	11	40	55	−15	13	
8	Port Glasgow Athletic	18	4	5	9	38	50	−12	13	
10	Dumbarton (R)	18	2	2	14	27	64	−37	6	Resigned (Note: Dumbarton resigned from the league at the end of the season.)

Source: statto.com
Rules for classification: Teams finish equal if level on points. Points system: 2 points for a win, 1 point for a draw, 0 points for a loss
(C) Champions; (P) Promoted; (R) Relegated

== 1897-1898 ==
Manager: Committee

=== Scottish Second Division ===
Pos	Team	Pld	W	D	L	GF	GA	GD	Pts	Qualification or relegation
1	Kilmarnock (C)	18	14	1	3	64	29	+35	29	
2	Port Glasgow Athletic	18	12	1	5	66	36	+30	25	
3	Morton	18	9	4	5	47	38	+9	22	
4	Leith Athletic	18	9	2	7	40	39	+1	20	
5	Abercorn	18	6	4	8	33	41	−8	16	
5	Ayr	18	7	2	9	36	43	−7	16	
5	Linthouse	18	6	4	8	38	39	−1	16	
8	Airdrieonians	18	6	2	10	45	56	−11	14	
9	Hamilton Academical	14	5	2	7	26	32	−6	12 (Note: Hamilton Academical took Renton's place in the league and fulfilled the club's remaining fixtures.)	
10	Motherwell	18	3	4	11	31	56	−25	10	
-	Renton (R)	4	0	0	4	2	19	−17	0	Resigned (Note: Renton resigned after playing four games.)

Source: statto.com
Rules for classification: Teams finish equal if level on points. Points system: 2 points for a win, 1 point for a draw, 0 points for a loss
(C) Champions; (R) Relegated

== 1898-1899 ==
Manager: Committee

=== Scottish Second Division ===
Pos	Team	Pld	W	D	L	GF	GA	GD	Pts	Promotion or relegation
1	Kilmarnock (C, P)	18	14	4	0	73	24	+49	32	Elected to the 1899–1900 Scottish First Division
2	Leith Athletic	18	12	3	3	63	38	+25	27	
3	Port Glasgow Athletic	18	12	1	5	75	51	+24	25	
4	Motherwell	18	7	6	5	41	40	+1	20	
5	Airdrieonians	18	6	3	9	36	46	−10	15	
5	Hamilton Academical	18	7	1	10	48	58	−10	15	
7	Ayr	18	5	3	10	35	51	−16	13	
7	Morton	18	6	1	11	36	42	−6	13	
9	Linthouse	18	5	1	12	29	62	−33	11	
10	Abercorn	18	4	1	13	41	65	−24	9	

Rules for classification: Teams finish equal if level on points. Points system: 2 points for a win, 1 point for a draw, 0 points for a loss.
(C) Champions; (P) Promoted

=== Other Honours ===
Lanarkshire Cup winners

== 1899-1900 ==
Manager: Committee

=== Scottish Second Division ===
Pos	Team	Pld	W	D	L	GF	GA	GD	Pts	Promotion or relegation
1	Partick Thistle (C, P)	18	14	1	3	55	26	+29	29	Promoted to the 1900–01 Scottish Division One
2	Morton (P)	18	14	0	4	66	25	+41	28	Promoted to the 1900–01 Scottish Division One
3	Port Glasgow Athletic	18	10	0	8	50	41	+9	20	
4	Leith Athletic	18	9	1	8	32	37	−5	19	
4	Motherwell	18	9	1	8	38	36	+2	19	
6	Abercorn	18	7	2	9	46	39	+7	16	
7	Hamilton Academical	18	7	1	10	33	45	−12	15	
8	Ayr	18	6	2	10	39	48	−9	14	
9	Airdrieonians	18	4	3	11	27	49	−22	11	
10	Linthouse (R)	18	2	5	11	28	68	−40	9	Failed re-election (Note: Linthouse failed re-election to compete in the next season and were replaced by East Stirlingshire.)

Source: statto.com
Rules for classification: Teams finish equal if level on points. Points system: 2 points for a win, 1 point for a draw, 0 points for a loss
(C) Champions; (P) Promoted; (R) Relegated

== 1900-1901 ==
Manager: Committee

=== Scottish Second Division ===
Pos	Team	Pld	W	D	L	GF	GA	GD	Pts
1	St Bernard's (C)	18	11	4	3	42	26	+16	26
2	Airdrieonians	18	11	1	6	43	32	+11	23
3	Abercorn	18	9	3	6	37	33	+4	21
4	Clyde	18	9	2	7	43	35	+8	20
4	Port Glasgow Athletic	18	10	0	8	45	43	+2	20
6	Ayr	18	9	0	9	32	34	−2	18
7	East Stirlingshire	18	7	3	8	34	39	−5	17
8	Hamilton Academical	18	4	4	10	41	49	−8	12
8	Leith Athletic	18	5	2	11	22	32	−10	12
10	Motherwell	18	4	3	11	26	42	−16	11

Source: statto.com
Rules for classification: Teams finish equal if level on points. Points system: 2 points for a win, 1 point for a draw, 0 points for a loss
(C) Champions

=== Other Honours ===
Lanarkshire Cup winners

== 1901-1902 ==
Manager: Committee

=== Scottish Second Division ===
Pos	Team	Pld	W	D	L	GF	GA	GD	Pts	Promotion or relegation
1	Port Glasgow Athletic (C, P)	22	14	4	4	75	31	+44	32	Promoted to the 1902–03 Scottish Division One
2	Partick Thistle (P)	22	13	4	5	50	29	+21	30	Promoted to the 1902–03 Scottish Division One
3	Motherwell	22	12	2	8	50	44	+6	26	
4	Airdrieonians	22	10	5	7	41	32	+9	25	
4	Hamilton Academical	22	11	3	8	45	40	+5	25	
6	St Bernard's	22	10	2	10	30	31	−1	22	
7	Ayr	22	8	5	9	27	33	−6	21	
7	Leith Athletic	22	9	3	10	34	38	−4	21	
9	East Stirlingshire	22	8	3	11	38	46	−8	19	
10	Arthurlie	22	6	5	11	32	42	−10	17	
11	Abercorn	22	4	5	13	27	59	−32	13	
11	Clyde	22	5	3	14	21	45	−24	13	

Source: statto.com
Rules for classification: Teams finish equal if level on points. Points system: 2 points for a win, 1 point for a draw, 0 points for a loss
(C) Champions; (P) Promoted

== 1902-1903 ==
Manager: Committee

=== Scottish Second Division ===
Pos	Team	Pld	W	D	L	GF	GA	GD	Pts	Promotion or relegation
1	Airdrieonians (C, P)	22	15	5	2	43	19	+24	35	Promoted to the 1903–04 Scottish Division One
2	Motherwell (P)	22	12	4	6	44	35	+9	28	Promoted to the 1903–04 Scottish Division One
3	Ayr	22	12	3	7	34	34	0	27	
3	Leith Athletic	22	11	5	6	43	42	+1	27	
5	St Bernard's	22	12	2	8	45	32	+13	26	
6	Falkirk	22	8	7	7	39	37	+2	23	
6	Hamilton Academical	22	11	1	10	45	35	+10	23	
8	East Stirlingshire	22	9	3	10	46	41	+5	21	
9	Arthurlie	22	6	8	8	34	46	−12	20	
10	Abercorn	22	5	2	15	35	58	−23	12	
11	Clyde	22	2	7	13	22	40	−18	11	
11	Raith Rovers	22	3	5	14	34	55	−21	11	

Source: statto.com
Rules for classification: Teams finish equal if level on points. Points system: 2 points for a win, 1 point for a draw, 0 points for a loss
(C) Champions; (P) Promoted

== 1903-1904 ==
Manager: Committee

=== Scottish First Division ===
Pos	Team	Pld	W	D	L	GF	GA	GD	Pts	Qualification or relegation
1	Third Lanark (C)	26	20	3	3	61	26	+35	43	Champions
2	Heart of Midlothian	26	18	3	5	63	35	+28	39	
=3	Celtic	26	18	2	6	68	27	+41	38	
=3	Rangers	26	16	6	4	80	33	+47	38	
5	Dundee	26	13	2	11	54	45	+9	28	
=6	St Mirren	26	11	5	10	45	38	+7	27	
=6	Partick Thistle	26	10	7	9	46	41	+5	27	
8	Queen's Park	26	6	9	11	28	47	−19	21	
9	Port Glasgow Athletic	26	8	4	14	32	49	−17	20	
10	Hibernian	26	7	5	14	29	40	−11	19	
=11	Morton	26	7	4	15	32	53	−21	18	
=11	Airdrieonians	26	7	4	15	32	62	−30	18	
13	Motherwell	26	6	3	17	26	61	−35	15	
14	Kilmarnock	26	4	5	17	24	63	−39	13	

Source: nozdrul.plus.com
(C) Champions

== 1904–05 ==
Manager: Committee

=== Scottish First Division ===
Pos	Team	Pld	W	D	L	GF	GA	GD	Pts	Qualification or relegation
=1	Celtic (C)	26	18	5	3	68	31	+37	41	Champions
=1	Rangers	26	19	3	4	83	28	+55	41	
3	Third Lanark	26	14	7	5	60	28	+32	35	
4	Airdrieonians	26	11	5	10	38	45	−7	27	
5	Hibernian	26	9	8	9	39	39	0	26	
6	Partick Thistle	26	12	2	12	36	56	−20	26	
7	Heart of Midlothian	26	11	3	12	46	44	+2	25	
8	Dundee	26	10	5	11	38	32	+6	25	
9	Kilmarnock	26	9	5	12	29	45	−16	23	
10	St Mirren	26	9	4	13	33	36	−3	22	
11	Port Glasgow Athletic	26	8	5	13	30	51	−21	21	
12	Queen's Park	26	6	8	12	28	45	−17	20	
13	Morton	26	7	4	15	27	50	−23	18	
14	Motherwell	26	6	2	18	28	53	−25	14	

Source: SPFL Archive
(C) Champions

== 1905-1906 ==
Manager: Committee

=== Scottish First Division ===
Pos	Team	Pld	W	D	L	GF	GA	GD	Pts	Qualification or relegation
1	Celtic (C)	30	24	1	5	76	19	+57	49	Champions
2	Heart of Midlothian	30	18	7	5	64	27	+37	43	
3	Airdrieonians	30	15	8	7	53	31	+22	38	
4	Rangers	30	15	7	8	58	48	+10	37	
5	Partick Thistle	30	15	6	9	44	40	+4	36	
6	Third Lanark	30	16	2	12	62	38	+24	34	
7	Dundee	30	11	12	7	40	33	+7	34	
8	St Mirren	30	13	5	12	41	37	+4	31	
9	Morton	30	10	6	14	35	54	−19	26	
10	Motherwell	30	9	8	13	50	64	−14	26	
11	Hibernian	30	10	5	15	35	40	−5	25	
12	Aberdeen	30	8	8	14	37	49	−12	24	
13	Falkirk	30	9	5	16	53	69	−16	23	
14	Port Glasgow Athletic	30	6	8	16	38	68	−30	20	
15	Kilmarnock	30	8	4	18	46	68	−22	20	
16	Queen's Park	30	5	4	21	41	88	−47	14	

Source: "1905-1906 Division 1 - SPFL Archive". SPFL.
(C) Champions

== 1906-1907 ==
Manager: Committee

=== Scottish First Division ===
Pos	Team	Pld	W	D	L	GF	GA	GD	Pts	Qualification or relegation
1	Celtic (C)	34	23	9	2	80	30	+50	55	Champions
2	Dundee	34	18	12	4	53	26	+27	48	
3	Rangers	34	19	7	8	69	33	+36	45	
4	Airdrieonians	34	18	6	10	59	44	+15	42	
5	Falkirk	34	17	7	10	73	58	+15	41	
6	Third Lanark	34	15	9	10	57	48	+9	39	
7	St Mirren	34	12	13	9	50	44	+6	37	
8	Clyde	34	15	6	13	47	52	−5	36	
9	Heart of Midlothian	34	11	13	10	46	43	+3	35	
10	Motherwell	34	12	9	13	45	48	−3	33	
11	Hibernian	34	10	10	14	40	49	−9	30	
12	Aberdeen	34	10	10	14	48	55	−7	30	
13	Morton	34	11	6	17	41	50	−9	28	
14	Partick Thistle	34	9	8	17	40	60	−20	26	
15	Queen's Park	34	9	6	19	51	66	−15	24	
16	Port Glasgow Athletic	34	7	7	20	30	67	−37	21	
17	Kilmarnock	34	8	5	21	40	72	−32	21	
18	Hamilton Academical	34	8	5	21	40	64	−24	21	

(C) Champions

=== Other Honours ===
Lanarkshire Cup winners

== 1907-1908 ==
Manager: Committee

=== Scottish First Division ===
Pos	Team	Pld	W	D	L	GF	GA	GD	Pts
1	Celtic (C)	34	24	7	3	86	27	+59	55
2	Falkirk	34	22	7	5	103	42	+61	51
3	Rangers	34	21	8	5	74	40	+34	50
4	Dundee	34	20	8	6	71	28	+43	48
5	Hibernian	34	17	8	9	55	42	+13	42
6	Airdrieonians	34	18	5	11	58	41	+17	41
7	St Mirren	34	13	10	11	50	59	−9	36
8	Aberdeen	34	13	9	12	45	44	+1	35
9	Third Lanark	34	13	7	14	45	50	−5	33
10	Motherwell	34	12	7	15	61	53	+8	31
11	Heart of Midlothian	34	11	6	17	50	62	−12	28
12	Hamilton Academical	34	10	8	16	55	65	−10	28
13	Morton	34	9	9	16	43	66	−23	27
14	Partick Thistle	34	8	9	17	43	69	−26	25
15	Kilmarnock	34	6	13	15	38	61	−23	25
16	Queen's Park	34	7	8	19	54	84	−30	22
17	Clyde	34	5	8	21	38	75	−37	18
18	Port Glasgow Athletic	34	5	7	22	39	98	−59	17

(C) Champions

== 1908-1909 ==
Manager: Committee

=== Scottish First Division ===
Pos	Team	Pld	W	D	L	GF	GA	GD	Pts
1	Celtic (C)	34	23	5	6	71	24	+47	51
2	Dundee	34	22	6	6	70	32	+38	50
3	Clyde	34	21	6	7	61	37	+24	48
4	Rangers	34	19	7	8	91	38	+53	45
5	Airdrieonians	34	16	9	9	67	46	+21	41
6	Hibernian	34	16	7	11	40	32	+8	39
7	St Mirren	34	15	6	13	53	45	+8	36
8	Aberdeen	34	15	6	13	61	53	+8	36
9	Kilmarnock	34	13	7	14	47	61	−14	33
10	Falkirk	34	13	7	14	58	56	+2	33
11	Heart of Midlothian	34	12	8	14	54	49	+5	32
12	Third Lanark	34	11	10	13	56	49	+7	32
13	Motherwell	34	11	6	17	47	73	−26	28
14	Port Glasgow Athletic	34	10	8	16	39	52	−13	28
15	Queen's Park	34	6	13	15	42	65	−23	25
16	Hamilton Academical	34	6	12	16	42	72	−30	24
17	Morton	34	8	7	19	39	90	−51	23
18	Partick Thistle	34	2	4	28	38	102	−64	8

Source: "1908-1909 Division 1 - SPFL Archive". SPFL.
(C) Champions

== 1909-1910 ==
Manager: Committee

=== Scottish First Division ===
Pos	Team	Pld	W	D	L	GF	GA	GD	Pts	Qualification or relegation
1	Third Lanark (C)	26	20	3	3	61	26	+35	43	Champions
2	Heart of Midlothian	26	18	3	5	63	35	+28	39	
=3	Celtic	26	18	2	6	68	27	+41	38	
=3	Rangers	26	16	6	4	80	33	+47	38	
5	Dundee	26	13	2	11	54	45	+9	28	
=6	St Mirren	26	11	5	10	45	38	+7	27	
=6	Partick Thistle	26	10	7	9	46	41	+5	27	
8	Queen's Park	26	6	9	11	28	47	−19	21	
9	Port Glasgow Athletic	26	8	4	14	32	49	−17	20	
10	Hibernian	26	7	5	14	29	40	−11	19	
=11	Morton	26	7	4	15	32	53	−21	18	
=11	Airdrieonians	26	7	4	15	32	62	−30	18	
13	Motherwell	26	6	3	17	26	61	−35	15	
14	Kilmarnock	26	4	5	17	24	63	−39	13	

Source: nozdrul.plus.com
(C) Champions

== 1910-1911 ==
Manager: Committee

=== Scottish First Division ===
Pos	Team	Pld	W	D	L	GF	GA	GD	Pts
1	Rangers (C)	34	23	6	5	90	34	+56	52
2	Aberdeen	34	19	10	5	53	28	+25	48
3	Falkirk	34	17	10	7	65	42	+23	44
4	Partick Thistle	34	17	8	9	50	41	+9	42
5	Celtic	34	15	11	8	48	18	+30	41
6	Dundee	34	18	5	11	54	42	+12	41
7	Third Lanark	34	16	7	11	59	53	+6	39
8	Clyde	34	14	11	9	45	36	+9	39
9	Hibernian	34	15	6	13	44	48	−4	36
10	Kilmarnock	34	12	10	12	42	45	−3	34
11	Airdrieonians	34	12	9	13	49	53	−4	33
12	St Mirren	34	12	7	15	46	57	−11	31
13	Morton	34	9	11	14	49	51	−2	29
14	Heart of Midlothian	34	8	8	18	42	59	−17	24
15	Raith Rovers	34	7	10	17	36	55	−19	24
16	Hamilton Academical	34	8	5	21	31	60	−29	21
17	Motherwell	34	8	4	22	37	66	−29	20
18	Queen's Park	34	5	4	25	28	80	−52	14

Rules for classification: Teams finish equal if level on points. Points system: 2 points for a win, 1 point for a draw, 0 points for a loss
(C) Champions

== 1911-1912 ==
Manager: John 'Sailor' Hunter, appointed April 1911.

=== Scottish First Division ===
Pos	Team	Pld	W	D	L	GF	GA	GD	Pts
1	Rangers (C)	34	24	3	7	86	34	+52	51
2	Celtic	34	17	11	6	58	33	+25	45
3	Clyde	34	19	4	11	56	32	+24	42
4	Heart of Midlothian	34	16	8	10	54	40	+14	40
5	Partick Thistle	34	16	8	10	47	40	+7	40
6	Morton	34	14	9	11	44	44	0	37
7	Falkirk	34	15	6	13	46	33	+13	36
8	Dundee	34	13	9	12	52	41	+11	35
9	Aberdeen	34	14	7	13	44	44	0	35
10	Airdrieonians	34	12	8	14	40	41	−1	32
11	Third Lanark	34	12	7	15	40	57	−17	31
12	Hamilton Academical	34	11	8	15	32	44	−12	30
13	Hibernian	34	12	5	17	44	47	−3	29
14	Motherwell	34	11	5	18	34	44	−10	27
15	Raith Rovers	34	9	9	16	39	59	−20	27
16	Kilmarnock	34	11	4	19	38	60	−22	26
17	Queen's Park	34	8	9	17	29	53	−24	25
18	St Mirren	34	7	10	17	32	59	−27	24

Source: "1911-1912 Division 1 - SPFL Archive". SPFL.
(C) Champions

=== Other Honours ===
Lanarkshire Cup winners

== 1912-1913 ==
Manager: John 'Sailor' Hunter

=== Scottish First Division ===
Pos	Team	Pld	W	D	L	GF	GA	GD	Pts
1	Rangers (C)	34	24	5	5	76	41	+35	53
2	Celtic	34	22	5	7	53	28	+25	49
=3	Heart of Midlothian	34	17	7	10	71	43	+28	41
=3	Airdrieonians	34	15	11	8	64	46	+18	41
5	Falkirk	34	14	12	8	56	38	+18	40
=6	Hibernian	34	16	5	13	63	54	+9	37
=6	Motherwell	34	12	13	9	47	39	+8	37
=6	Aberdeen	34	14	9	11	47	40	+7	37
9	Clyde	34	13	9	12	41	44	−3	35
10	Hamilton Academical	34	12	8	14	44	47	−3	32
11	Kilmarnock	34	10	11	13	37	54	−17	31
12	St Mirren	34	10	10	14	50	60	−10	30
=13	Dundee	34	8	13	13	33	46	−13	29
=13	Morton	34	11	7	16	50	59	−9	29
15	Third Lanark	34	8	12	14	31	41	−10	28
16	Raith Rovers	34	8	10	16	46	60	−14	26
17	Partick Thistle	34	10	4	20	40	55	−15	24
18	Queen's Park	34	5	3	26	34	88	−54	13

Source: "1912-1913 Division 1 - SPFL Archive". SPFL.
(C) Champions

== 1913-1914 ==
Manager: John 'Sailor' Hunter

=== Scottish First Division ===
Pos	Team	Pld	W	D	L	GF	GA	GD	Pts
1	Celtic (C)	38	30	5	3	81	14	+67	65
2	Rangers	38	27	5	6	79	31	+48	59
3	Heart of Midlothian	38	23	8	7	70	29	+41	54
4	Morton	38	26	2	10	76	51	+25	54
5	Falkirk	38	20	9	9	69	51	+18	49
6	Airdrieonians	38	18	12	8	72	43	+29	48
7	Dundee	38	19	5	14	64	53	+11	43
8	Third Lanark	38	13	10	15	42	51	−9	36
9	Clyde	38	11	11	16	44	44	0	33
10	Ayr United	38	13	7	18	56	72	−16	33
11	Raith Rovers	38	13	6	19	56	57	−1	32
12	Kilmarnock	38	11	9	18	48	68	−20	31
13	Hibernian	38	12	6	20	58	75	−17	30
14	Aberdeen	38	10	10	18	38	55	−17	30
15	Partick Thistle	38	10	9	19	37	51	−14	29
16	Queen's Park	38	10	9	19	52	84	−32	29
17	Motherwell	38	11	6	21	46	65	−19	28
18	Hamilton Academical	38	11	6	21	49	66	−17	28
19	Dumbarton	38	10	7	21	45	87	−42	27
20	St Mirren	38	8	6	24	38	73	−35	22

Source: "1913-1914 Division 1 - SPFL Archive". SPFL.
(C) Champions

== 1914-1915 ==
Manager: John 'Sailor' Hunter

=== Scottish First Division ===
Pos	Team	Pld	W	D	L	GF	GA	GD	Pts
1	Celtic (C)	38	30	5	3	91	25	+66	65
2	Heart of Midlothian	38	27	7	4	83	32	+51	61
3	Rangers	38	23	4	11	74	47	+27	50
4	Morton	38	18	12	8	74	48	+26	48
5	Ayr United	38	20	8	10	55	40	+15	48
6	Falkirk	38	16	7	15	48	48	0	39
7	Partick Thistle	38	15	8	15	56	58	−2	38
8	Hamilton Academical	38	16	6	16	60	55	+5	38
9	St Mirren	38	14	8	16	56	65	−9	36
10	Hibernian	38	12	11	15	59	66	−7	35
11	Airdrieonians	38	14	7	17	54	60	−6	35
12	Dumbarton	38	13	8	17	51	66	−15	34
13	Kilmarnock	38	15	4	19	55	59	−4	34
14	Dundee	38	12	9	17	43	61	−18	33
15	Aberdeen	38	11	11	16	39	52	−13	33
16	Third Lanark	38	10	12	16	51	57	−6	32
17	Clyde	38	12	6	20	44	59	−15	30
18	Motherwell	38	10	10	18	49	66	−17	30
19	Raith Rovers	38	9	10	19	53	68	−15	28
20	Queen's Park	38	4	5	29	27	90	−63	13

(C) Champions

=== Other Honours ===
Lanarkshire Express Cup winners

== 1915-1916 ==
Manager: John 'Sailor' Hunter

=== Scottish First Division ===
Pos	Team	Pld	W	D	L	GF	GA	GD	Pts
1	Celtic (C)	38	32	3	3	116	23	+93	67
2	Rangers	38	25	6	7	87	39	+48	56
3	Morton	37	22	7	8	86	35	+51	51
4	Ayr United	38	20	8	10	72	45	+27	48
5	Heart of Midlothian	37	20	6	11	66	45	+21	46
6	Partick Thistle	38	19	8	11	65	41	+24	46
7	Hamilton Academical	38	19	3	16	68	76	−8	41
8	Dundee	38	18	4	16	56	49	+7	40
9	Dumbarton	38	13	11	14	54	64	−10	37
10	Kilmarnock	38	12	11	15	46	49	−3	35
11	Aberdeen	38	11	12	15	51	64	−13	34
12	Falkirk	38	12	9	17	45	61	−16	33
13	St Mirren	38	13	4	21	50	67	−17	30
14	Motherwell	38	11	8	19	55	82	−27	30
15	Airdrieonians	38	11	8	19	44	74	−30	30
16	Third Lanark	38	9	11	18	40	56	−16	29
17	Clyde	38	11	7	20	49	71	−22	29
18	Queen's Park	38	11	6	21	53	100	−47	28
19	Hibernian	38	9	7	22	44	71	−27	25
20	Raith Rovers	38	9	5	24	30	65	−35	23

Source: "1915-1916 SFL - SPFL Archive". SPFL.
(C) Champions

== 1916-1917 ==
Manager: John 'Sailor' Hunter

=== Scottish First Division ===
Pos	Team	Pld	W	D	L	GF	GA	GD	Pts
1	Celtic (C)	38	27	10	1	79	17	+62	64
2	Morton	38	24	6	8	72	39	+33	54
3	Rangers	38	24	5	9	68	32	+36	53
4	Airdrieonians	38	21	8	9	71	38	+33	50
5	Third Lanark	38	19	11	8	53	37	+16	49
6	Kilmarnock	38	18	7	13	69	46	+23	43
7	St Mirren	38	15	10	13	49	43	+6	40
8	Motherwell	38	16	6	16	57	59	−2	38
9	Dumbarton	38	12	11	15	56	73	−17	35
9	Partick Thistle	38	14	7	17	44	43	+1	35
9	Hamilton Academical	38	13	9	16	54	73	−19	35
12	Clyde	38	10	14	14	41	53	−12	34
12	Falkirk	38	12	10	16	58	57	+1	34
14	Heart of Midlothian	38	14	4	20	44	59	−15	32
15	Ayr United	38	12	7	19	47	59	−12	31
16	Dundee	38	13	4	21	58	71	−13	30
16	Hibernian	38	10	10	18	57	72	−15	30
18	Queen's Park	38	11	7	20	56	81	−25	29
19	Raith Rovers	38	8	7	23	42	91	−49	23
20	Aberdeen	38	7	7	24	36	68	−32	21

Source: "1916-1917 SFL - SPFL Archive". SPFL.
(C) Champions

== 1917-1918 ==
Manager: John 'Sailor' Hunter

=== Scottish First Division ===
Pos	Team	Pld	W	D	L	GF	GA	GD	Pts
1	Rangers (C)	34	25	6	3	66	24	+42	56
2	Celtic	34	24	7	3	66	26	+40	55
3	Kilmarnock	34	19	5	10	69	41	+28	43
4	Morton	34	17	9	8	53	42	+11	43
5	Motherwell	34	16	9	9	70	51	+19	41
6	Partick Thistle	34	14	12	8	51	37	+14	40
7	Dumbarton	34	13	8	13	48	49	−1	34
7	Queen's Park	34	14	6	14	64	63	+1	34
9	Clydebank	34	14	5	15	55	56	−1	33
10	Hearts	34	14	4	16	41	58	−17	32
11	St Mirren	34	11	7	16	42	50	−8	29
12	Hamilton Academical	34	11	6	17	52	63	−11	28
13	Third Lanark	34	10	7	17	56	62	−6	27
14	Falkirk	34	9	9	16	38	58	−20	27
15	Airdrieonians	34	10	6	18	46	58	−12	26
16	Hibernian	34	8	9	17	42	57	−15	25
17	Clyde	34	9	2	23	37	72	−35	20
18	Ayr United	34	5	9	20	32	61	−29	19

(C) Champions

=== Other Honours ===
Lanarkshire Charity Cup winners
Motherwell Charity Cup winners

== 1918-1919 ==
Manager: John 'Sailor' Hunter

=== Scottish First Division ===
Pos	Team	Pld	W	D	L	GF	GA	GD	Pts
1	Celtic (C)	34	26	6	2	71	22	+49	58
2	Rangers	34	26	5	3	86	16	+70	57
3	Morton	34	18	11	5	76	40	+36	47
4	Partick Thistle	34	17	7	10	62	43	+19	41
5	Motherwell	34	14	10	10	51	40	+11	38
5	Ayr United	34	15	8	11	62	53	+9	38
7	Heart of Midlothian	34	14	9	11	59	52	+7	37
8	Kilmarnock	34	14	7	13	61	59	+2	35
9	Queen's Park	34	15	5	14	59	57	+2	35
10	St Mirren	34	10	12	12	43	55	−12	32
10	Clydebank	34	12	8	14	54	65	−11	32
12	Third Lanark	34	11	9	14	60	62	−2	31
13	Airdrieonians	34	9	11	14	45	54	−9	29
14	Hamilton Academical	34	11	5	18	49	75	−26	27
15	Dumbarton	34	7	8	19	31	58	−27	22
16	Clyde	34	7	6	21	45	75	−30	20
16	Falkirk	34	6	8	20	46	73	−27	20
18	Hibernian	34	5	3	26	30	91	−61	13

Source: "1918-1919 SFL - SPFL Archive". SPFL.
(C) Champions

== 1919-1920 ==
Manager: John 'Sailor' Hunter

=== Scottish First Division ===
Pos	Team	Pld	W	D	L	GF	GA	GD	Pts
1	Rangers (C)	42	31	9	2	106	25	+81	71
2	Celtic	42	29	10	3	89	31	+58	68
3	Motherwell	42	23	11	8	74	53	+21	57
4	Dundee	42	22	6	14	79	65	+14	50
5	Clydebank	42	20	8	14	79	65	+14	48
6	Morton	42	16	13	13	71	48	+23	45
7	Airdrieonians	42	17	10	15	57	43	+14	44
8	Third Lanark	42	16	11	15	56	62	−6	43
9	Kilmarnock	42	20	3	19	59	73	−14	43
10	Ayr United	42	15	10	17	72	69	+3	40
11	Dumbarton	42	13	13	16	57	65	−8	39
12	St Mirren	42	15	8	19	63	81	−18	38
13	Partick Thistle	42	13	12	17	51	62	−11	38
14	Queen's Park	42	14	10	18	67	73	−6	38
15	Heart of Midlothian	42	14	9	19	57	72	−15	37
16	Clyde	42	14	9	19	64	71	−7	37
17	Aberdeen	42	11	13	18	46	64	−18	35
18	Hibernian	42	13	7	22	60	79	−19	33
19	Raith Rovers	42	11	10	21	61	83	−22	32
20	Falkirk	42	10	11	21	45	74	−29	31
21	Hamilton Academical	42	11	7	24	56	86	−30	29
22	Albion Rovers	42	10	8	24	43	77	−34	28

Source: "1919-1920 SFL - SPFL Archive". SPFL.
(C) Champions

== 1920-1921 ==
Manager: John 'Sailor' Hunter

=== Scottish First Division ===
Pos	Team	Pld	W	D	L	GF	GA	GD	Pts
1	Rangers (C)	42	35	6	1	91	24	+67	76
2	Celtic	42	30	6	6	89	31	+58	66
3	Heart of Midlothian	42	20	10	12	74	49	+25	50
4	Dundee	42	19	11	12	54	48	+6	49
5	Motherwell	42	19	10	13	75	51	+24	48
6	Partick Thistle	42	17	12	13	53	39	+14	46
7	Clyde	42	21	3	18	63	62	+1	45
8	Third Lanark	42	19	6	17	74	61	+13	44
9	Morton	42	15	14	13	66	58	+8	44
10	Airdrieonians	42	17	9	16	71	64	+7	43
11	Kilmarnock	42	17	8	17	62	68	−6	42
12	Aberdeen	42	14	14	14	53	54	−1	42
13	Hibernian	42	16	9	17	58	57	+1	41
14	Hamilton Academical	42	14	12	16	44	57	−13	40
15	Ayr United	42	14	12	16	62	69	−7	40
16	Raith Rovers	42	16	5	21	54	58	−4	37
17	Falkirk	42	11	12	19	54	72	−18	34
18	Albion Rovers	42	11	12	19	57	68	−11	34
19	Queen's Park	42	11	11	20	45	80	−35	33
20	Clydebank	42	7	14	21	47	72	−25	28
21	Dumbarton	42	10	4	28	41	89	−48	24
22	St Mirren	42	7	4	31	43	92	−49	18

(C) Champions

=== Other Honours ===
Lanarkshire Express Cup winners

== 1921-1922 ==
Manager: John 'Sailor' Hunter

=== Scottish First Division ===
Pos	Team	Pld	W	D	L	GF	GA	GD	Pts	Qualification or relegation
1	Celtic (C)	42	27	13	2	83	20	+63	67	
2	Rangers	42	28	10	4	83	26	+57	66	
3	Raith Rovers	42	19	13	10	66	43	+23	51	
4	Dundee	42	19	11	12	57	40	+17	49	
5	Falkirk	42	16	17	9	48	38	+10	49	
6	Partick Thistle	42	20	8	14	57	53	+4	48	
7	Hibernian	42	16	14	12	55	44	+11	46	
8	St Mirren	42	17	12	13	71	61	+10	46	
9	Third Lanark	42	17	12	13	58	52	+6	46	
10	Clyde	42	16	12	14	60	51	+9	44	
11	Albion Rovers	42	17	10	15	55	51	+4	44	
12	Morton	42	16	10	16	58	57	+1	42	
13	Motherwell	42	16	7	19	63	58	+5	39	
14	Ayr United	42	13	12	17	55	63	−8	38	
15	Aberdeen	42	13	9	20	48	54	−6	35	
16	Airdrieonians	42	12	11	19	46	56	−10	35	
17	Kilmarnock	42	13	9	20	56	83	−27	35	
18	Hamilton Academical	42	9	16	17	51	62	−11	34	
19	Hearts	42	11	10	21	50	60	−10	32	
20	Dumbarton (R)	42	10	10	22	46	81	−35	30	Relegation to the 1922–23 Second Division
21	Queen's Park (R)	42	9	10	23	38	82	−44	28	Relegation to the 1922–23 Second Division
22	Clydebank (R)	42	6	8	28	34	103	−69	20	Relegation to the 1922–23 Second Division

Source: "1921-1922 Division 1 - SPFL Archive". SPFL.
(C) Champions; (R) Relegated

== 1922-1923 ==
Manager: John 'Sailor' Hunter

=== Scottish First Division ===
Pos	Team	Pld	W	D	L	GF	GA	GD	Pts
1	Rangers	38	23	9	6	67	29	+38	55
2	Airdrieonians	38	20	10	8	58	38	+20	50
3	Celtic	38	19	8	11	52	39	+13	46
4	Falkirk	38	14	17	7	44	32	+12	45
5	Aberdeen	38	15	12	11	46	34	+12	42
6	St Mirren	38	15	12	11	54	44	+10	42
7	Dundee	38	17	7	14	51	45	+6	41
8	Hibernian	38	17	7	14	45	40	+5	41
9	Raith Rovers	38	13	13	12	31	43	−12	39
10	Ayr United	38	13	12	13	43	44	−1	38
11	Partick Thistle	38	14	9	15	51	48	+3	37
12	Heart of Midlothian	38	11	15	12	51	50	+1	37
13	Motherwell	38	13	10	15	59	60	−1	36
14	Morton	38	12	11	15	44	47	−3	35
15	Kilmarnock	38	14	7	17	57	66	−9	35
16	Clyde	38	12	9	17	36	44	−8	33
17	Third Lanark	38	11	8	19	40	59	−19	30
18	Hamilton Academical	38	11	7	20	43	59	−16	29
19	Albion Rovers	38	8	10	20	38	64	−26	26
20	Alloa Athletic	38	6	11	21	27	52	−25	23

Source: "1922-1923 Division 1 - SPFL Archive". SPFL.

== 1923-1924 ==
Manager: John 'Sailor' Hunter

=== Scottish First Division ===
Pos	Team	Pld	W	D	L	GF	GA	GD	Pts
1	Rangers	38	25	9	4	72	22	+50	59
2	Airdrieonians	38	20	10	8	72	46	+26	50
3	Celtic	38	17	12	9	56	33	+23	46
4	Raith Rovers	38	18	7	13	56	38	+18	43
5	Dundee	38	15	13	10	70	57	+13	43
6	St Mirren	38	15	12	11	53	45	+8	42
7	Hibernian	38	15	11	12	66	52	+14	41
8	Partick Thistle	38	15	9	14	58	55	+3	39
9	Heart of Midlothian	38	14	10	14	61	50	+11	38
10	Motherwell	38	15	7	16	58	63	−5	37
11	Morton	38	16	5	17	48	54	−6	37
12	Hamilton Academical	38	15	6	17	52	57	−5	36
13	Aberdeen	38	13	10	15	37	41	−4	36
14	Ayr United	38	12	10	16	38	60	−22	34
15	Falkirk	38	13	6	19	46	53	−7	32
16	Kilmarnock	38	12	8	18	48	65	−17	32
17	Queen's Park	38	11	9	18	43	60	−17	31
18	Third Lanark	38	11	8	19	54	78	−24	30
19	Clyde	38	10	9	19	40	70	−30	29
20	Clydebank	38	10	5	23	42	71	−29	25

Source: "1923-1924 Division 1 - SPFL Archive". SPFL (in Malay).

== 1924-1925 ==
Manager: John 'Sailor' Hunter

=== Scottish First Division ===
Pos	Team	Pld	W	D	L	GF	GA	GD	Pts
1	Rangers	38	25	10	3	76	26	+50	60
2	Airdrieonians	38	25	7	6	85	31	+54	57
3	Hibernian	38	22	8	8	78	43	+35	52
4	Celtic	38	18	8	12	77	44	+33	44
5	Cowdenbeath	38	16	10	12	76	65	+11	42
6	St Mirren	38	18	5	15	66	63	+3	41
7	Partick Thistle	38	14	10	14	60	61	−1	38
8	Dundee	38	14	8	16	47	54	−7	36
9	Raith Rovers	38	14	8	16	53	61	−8	36
10	Heart of Midlothian	38	12	11	15	64	68	−4	35
11	St Johnstone	38	12	11	15	57	72	−15	35
12	Kilmarnock	38	12	9	17	53	64	−11	33
13	Hamilton Academical	38	15	3	20	50	63	−13	33
14	Morton	38	12	9	17	46	69	−23	33
15	Aberdeen	38	11	10	17	46	56	−10	32
16	Falkirk	38	12	8	18	44	54	−10	32
17	Queen's Park	38	11	9	18	50	72	−22	31
18	Motherwell	38	10	10	18	54	63	−9	30
19	Ayr United	38	11	8	19	43	65	−22	30
20	Third Lanark	38	11	8	19	53	84	−31	30

=== Other Honours ===
Lanarkshire Express Cup winners

== 1925-1926 ==
Manager: John 'Sailor' Hunter

=== Scottish First Division ===
Pos	Team	Pld	W	D	L	GF	GA	GD	Pts
1	Celtic	38	25	8	5	97	40	+57	58
2	Airdrieonians	38	23	4	11	95	54	+41	50
3	Heart of Midlothian	38	21	8	9	87	56	+31	50
4	St Mirren	38	20	7	11	63	52	+11	47
5	Motherwell	38	19	8	11	67	46	+21	46
6	Rangers	38	19	6	13	79	55	+24	44
7	Cowdenbeath	38	18	6	14	87	68	+19	42
8	Falkirk	38	14	14	10	61	57	+4	42
9	Kilmarnock	38	17	7	14	79	77	+2	41
10	Dundee	38	14	9	15	47	59	−12	37
11	Aberdeen	38	13	10	15	49	54	−5	36
12	Hamilton Academical	38	13	9	16	68	79	−11	35
13	Queen's Park	38	15	4	19	70	81	−11	34
14	Partick Thistle	38	10	13	15	64	73	−9	33
15	Morton	38	12	7	19	57	84	−27	31
16	Hibernian	38	12	6	20	72	77	−5	30
17	Dundee United	38	11	6	21	52	74	−22	28
18	St Johnstone	38	9	10	19	43	78	−35	28
19	Raith Rovers	38	11	4	23	46	81	−35	26
20	Clydebank	38	7	8	23	55	92	−37	22

Source: "1925-1926 Division 1 - SPFL Archive". SPFL.

=== Other Honours ===
Lanarkshire Express Cup winners

== 1926-1927 ==
Manager: John 'Sailor' Hunter

=== Scottish First Division ===
Pos	Team	Pld	W	D	L	GF	GA	GD	Pts
1	Rangers	38	23	10	5	85	41	+44	56
2	Motherwell	38	23	5	10	81	52	+29	51
3	Celtic	38	21	7	10	101	55	+46	49
4	Airdrieonians	38	18	9	11	97	64	+33	45
5	Dundee	38	17	9	12	77	51	+26	43
6	Falkirk	38	15	12	11	77	60	+17	42
7	Cowdenbeath	38	18	6	14	74	60	+14	42
8	Aberdeen	38	13	14	11	73	72	+1	40
9	Hibernian	38	16	7	15	62	71	−9	39
10	St Mirren	38	16	5	17	78	76	+2	37
11	Partick Thistle	38	15	6	17	89	74	+15	36
12	Queen's Park	38	15	6	17	74	84	−10	36
13	Heart of Midlothian	38	12	11	15	65	64	+1	35
14	St Johnstone	38	13	9	16	55	69	−14	35
15	Hamilton Academical	38	13	9	16	60	85	−25	35
16	Kilmarnock	38	12	8	18	54	71	−17	32
17	Clyde	38	10	9	19	54	85	−31	29
18	Dunfermline Athletic	38	10	8	20	53	85	−32	28
19	Morton	38	12	4	22	56	101	−45	28
20	Dundee United	38	7	8	23	56	101	−45	22

Source: "1926-1927 Division 1 - SPFL Archive". SPFL.

=== Other Honours ===
Lanarkshire Cup winners

== 1927-1928 ==
Manager: John 'Sailor' Hunter

=== Scottish First Division ===
Pos	Team	Pld	W	D	L	GF	GA	GD	Pts
1	Rangers	38	26	8	4	109	36	+73	60
2	Celtic	38	23	9	6	93	39	+54	55
3	Motherwell	38	23	9	6	92	46	+46	55
4	Heart of Midlothian	38	20	7	11	89	50	+39	47
5	St Mirren	38	18	8	12	77	76	+1	44
6	Partick Thistle	38	18	7	13	85	67	+18	43
7	Aberdeen	38	19	5	14	71	61	+10	43
8	Kilmarnock	38	15	10	13	68	78	−10	40
9	Cowdenbeath	38	16	7	15	66	68	−2	39
10	Falkirk	38	16	5	17	76	69	+7	37
11	St Johnstone	38	14	8	16	66	67	−1	36
12	Hibernian	38	13	9	16	73	75	−2	35
13	Airdrieonians	38	12	11	15	59	69	−10	35
14	Dundee	38	14	7	17	65	80	−15	35
15	Clyde	38	10	11	17	46	72	−26	31
16	Queen's Park	38	12	6	20	69	80	−11	30
17	Raith Rovers	38	11	7	20	60	89	−29	29
18	Hamilton Academical	38	11	6	21	67	86	−19	28
19	Bo'ness	38	9	8	21	48	86	−38	26
20	Dunfermline Athletic	38	4	4	30	41	126	−85	12

Source: "1927-1928 Division 1 - SPFL Archive". SPFL.

=== Other Honours ===
Lanarkshire Cup winners

== 1928-1929 ==
Manager: John 'Sailor' Hunter

=== Scottish First Division ===
Pos	Team	Pld	W	D	L	GF	GA	GD	Pts
1	Rangers	38	30	7	1	107	32	+75	67
2	Celtic	38	22	7	9	67	44	+23	51
3	Motherwell	38	20	10	8	85	66	+19	50
4	Heart of Midlothian	38	19	9	10	91	57	+34	47
5	Queen's Park	38	18	7	13	100	69	+31	43
6	Partick Thistle	38	17	7	14	91	70	+21	41
7	Aberdeen	38	16	8	14	81	68	+13	40
8	St Mirren	38	16	8	14	78	75	+3	40
9	St Johnstone	38	14	10	14	57	70	−13	38
10	Kilmarnock	38	14	8	16	79	74	+5	36
11	Falkirk	38	14	8	16	68	86	−18	36
12	Hamilton Academical	38	13	9	16	58	83	−25	35
13	Cowdenbeath	38	14	5	19	55	69	−14	33
14	Hibernian	38	13	6	19	54	62	−8	32
15	Airdrieonians	38	12	7	19	56	65	−9	31
16	Ayr United	38	12	7	19	65	84	−19	31
17	Clyde	38	12	6	20	47	71	−24	30
18	Dundee	38	9	11	18	59	59	0	29
19	Third Lanark	38	10	6	22	71	102	−31	26
20	Raith Rovers	38	9	6	23	52	105	−53	24

=== Other Honours ===
Lanarkshire Cup winners

== 1929-1930 ==
Manager: John 'Sailor' Hunter

=== Scottish First Division ===
Pos	Team	Pld	W	D	L	GF	GA	GD	Pts
1	Rangers	38	28	4	6	94	32	+62	60
2	Motherwell	38	25	5	8	104	48	+56	55
3	Aberdeen	38	23	7	8	85	61	+24	53
4	Celtic	38	22	5	11	88	46	+42	49
5	St Mirren	38	18	5	15	73	56	+17	41
6	Partick Thistle	38	16	9	13	72	61	+11	41
7	Falkirk	38	16	9	13	62	64	−2	41
8	Kilmarnock	38	15	9	14	77	73	+4	39
9	Ayr United	38	16	6	16	70	92	−22	38
10	Heart of Midlothian	38	14	9	15	69	69	0	37
11	Clyde	38	13	11	14	64	69	−5	37
12	Airdrieonians	38	16	4	18	60	66	−6	36
13	Hamilton Academical	38	14	7	17	76	81	−5	35
14	Dundee	38	14	6	18	51	58	−7	34
15	Queen's Park	38	15	4	19	67	80	−13	34
16	Cowdenbeath	38	13	7	18	64	74	−10	33
17	Hibernian	38	9	11	18	45	62	−17	29
18	Morton	38	10	7	21	67	95	−28	27
19	Dundee United	38	7	8	23	56	109	−53	22
20	St Johnstone	38	6	7	25	48	96	−48	19

Source: "1929-1930 Division 1 - SPFL Archive". SPFL.

=== Other Honours ===
Lanarkshire Cup winners

== 1930-1931 ==
Manager: John 'Sailor' Hunter

=== Scottish First Division ===
Pos	Team	Pld	W	D	L	GF	GA	GD	Pts
1	Rangers	38	27	6	5	96	29	+67	60
2	Celtic	38	24	10	4	101	34	+67	58
3	Motherwell	38	24	8	6	102	42	+60	56
4	Partick Thistle	38	24	5	9	76	43	+33	53
5	Heart of Midlothian	38	19	6	13	90	63	+27	44
6	Aberdeen	38	17	7	14	79	63	+16	41
7	Cowdenbeath	38	17	7	14	58	65	−7	41
8	Dundee	38	17	5	16	65	63	+2	39
9	Airdrieonians	38	17	5	16	59	66	−7	39
10	Hamilton Academical	38	16	5	17	59	57	+2	37
11	Kilmarnock	38	15	5	18	59	60	−1	35
12	Clyde	38	15	4	19	60	87	−27	34
13	Queen's Park	38	13	7	18	71	72	−1	33
14	Falkirk	38	14	4	20	77	87	−10	32
15	St Mirren	38	11	8	19	49	72	−23	30
16	Morton	38	11	7	20	58	83	−25	29
17	Leith Athletic	38	8	11	19	51	85	−34	27
18	Ayr United	38	8	11	19	53	92	−39	27
19	Hibernian	38	9	7	22	49	81	−32	25
20	East Fife	38	8	4	26	45	113	−68	20

Source: "1930-1931 Division 1 - SPFL Archive". SPFL.

== 1931-1932 ==
Manager: John 'Sailor' Hunter

=== Scottish First Division ===
Pos	Team	Pld	W	D	L	GF	GA	GD	Pts
1	Motherwell	38	30	6	2	119	31	+88	66
2	Rangers	38	28	5	5	118	42	+76	61
3	Celtic	38	20	8	10	94	50	+44	48
4	Third Lanark	38	21	4	13	92	81	+11	46
5	St Mirren	38	20	4	14	77	56	+21	44
6	Partick Thistle	38	19	4	15	58	59	−1	42
7	Aberdeen	38	16	9	13	57	49	+8	41
8	Heart of Midlothian	38	17	5	16	63	61	+2	39
9	Kilmarnock	38	16	7	15	68	70	−2	39
10	Hamilton Academical	38	16	6	16	84	65	+19	38
11	Dundee	38	14	10	14	61	72	−11	38
12	Cowdenbeath	38	15	8	15	66	78	−12	38
13	Clyde	38	13	9	16	58	70	−12	35
14	Airdrieonians	38	13	6	19	74	81	−7	32
15	Morton	38	12	7	19	78	87	−9	31
16	Queen's Park	38	13	5	20	59	79	−20	31
17	Ayr United	38	11	7	20	70	90	−20	29
18	Falkirk	38	11	5	22	70	76	−6	27
19	Dundee United	38	6	7	25	40	118	−78	19
20	Leith Athletic	38	6	4	28	46	137	−91	16

=== Other Honours ===
Lanarkshire Cup winners

== 1932-1933 ==
Manager: John 'Sailor' Hunter

=== Scottish First Division ===
Pos	Team	Pld	W	D	L	GF	GA	GD	Pts
1	Rangers	38	26	10	2	113	43	+70	62
2	Motherwell	38	27	5	6	114	53	+61	59
3	Heart of Midlothian	38	21	8	9	84	51	+33	50
4	Celtic	38	20	8	10	75	44	+31	48
5	St Johnstone	38	17	10	11	70	55	+15	44
6	Aberdeen	38	18	6	14	85	58	+27	42
7	St Mirren	38	18	6	14	73	60	+13	42
8	Hamilton Academical	38	18	6	14	90	78	+12	42
9	Queen's Park	38	17	7	14	78	79	−1	41
10	Partick Thistle	38	17	6	15	75	55	+20	40
11	Falkirk	38	15	6	17	70	70	0	36
12	Clyde	38	15	5	18	69	75	−6	35
13	Third Lanark	38	14	7	17	70	80	−10	35
14	Kilmarnock	38	13	9	16	72	86	−14	35
15	Dundee	38	12	9	17	60	77	−17	33
16	Ayr United	38	13	4	21	62	95	−33	30
17	Cowdenbeath	38	10	5	23	65	111	−46	25
18	Airdrieonians	38	10	3	25	55	102	−47	23
19	Morton	38	6	9	23	49	97	−48	21
20	East Stirlingshire	38	7	3	28	55	115	−60	17

Source: RSSSF

== 1933-1934 ==
Manager: John 'Sailor' Hunter

=== Scottish First Division ===
Pos	Team	Pld	W	D	L	GF	GA	GD	Pts	Qualification or relegation
1	Rangers	38	30	6	2	118	41	+77	66	Champions
2	Motherwell	38	29	4	5	97	45	+52	62	
3	Celtic	38	18	11	9	78	53	+25	47	
4	Queen of the South	38	21	3	14	75	48	+27	45	
5	Aberdeen	38	18	8	12	90	57	+33	44	
6	Heart of Midlothian	38	17	10	11	86	59	+27	44	
7	Kilmarnock	38	17	9	12	73	64	+9	43	
8	Ayr United	38	16	10	12	87	92	−5	42	
9	St Johnstone	38	17	6	15	74	53	+21	40	
10	Falkirk	38	16	6	16	73	68	+5	38	
11	Hamilton Academical	38	15	8	15	65	79	−14	38	
12	Dundee	38	15	6	17	68	64	+4	36	
13	Partick Thistle	38	14	5	19	73	78	−5	33	
14	Clyde	38	10	11	17	56	70	−14	31	
15	Queen's Park	38	13	5	20	65	85	−20	31	
16	Hibernian	38	12	3	23	51	69	−18	27	
17	St Mirren	38	9	9	20	46	75	−29	27	
18	Airdrieonians	38	10	6	22	59	103	−44	26	
19	Third Lanark	38	8	9	21	62	103	−41	25	Relegated to Second Division
20	Cowdenbeath	38	5	5	28	58	118	−60	15	Relegated to Second Division

Source: RSSSF

== 1934-1935 ==
Manager: John 'Sailor' Hunter

=== Scottish First Division ===
Pos	Team	Pld	W	D	L	GF	GA	GD	Pts
1	Rangers	38	25	5	8	96	46	+50	55
2	Celtic	38	24	4	10	92	45	+47	52
3	Hearts	38	20	10	8	87	51	+36	50
4	Hamilton Academical	38	19	10	9	87	67	+20	48
5	St Johnstone	38	18	10	10	66	46	+20	46
6	Aberdeen	38	17	10	11	68	54	+14	44
7	Motherwell	38	15	10	13	83	64	+19	40
8	Dundee	38	16	8	14	63	63	0	40
9	Kilmarnock	38	16	6	16	76	68	+8	38
10	Clyde	38	14	10	14	71	69	+2	38
11	Hibernian	38	14	8	16	59	70	−11	36
12	Queen's Park	38	13	10	15	61	80	−19	36
13	Partick Thistle	38	15	5	18	61	68	−7	35
14	Airdrieonians	38	13	7	18	64	72	−8	33
15	Dunfermline Athletic	38	13	5	20	56	96	−40	31
16	Albion Rovers	38	10	9	19	62	77	−15	29
17	Queen of the South	38	11	7	20	52	72	−20	29
18	Ayr United	38	12	5	21	61	112	−51	29
19	St Mirren	38	11	5	22	49	70	−21	27
20	Falkirk	38	9	6	23	58	82	−24	24

Source: RSSSF

== 1935-1936 ==
Manager: John 'Sailor' Hunter

=== Scottish First Division ===
Pos	Team	Pld	W	D	L	GF	GA	GD	Pts
1	Celtic	38	32	2	4	115	33	+82	66
2	Rangers	38	27	7	4	110	43	+67	61
3	Aberdeen	38	26	9	3	96	50	+46	61
4	Motherwell	38	18	12	8	77	58	+19	48
5	Heart of Midlothian	38	20	7	11	88	55	+33	47
6	Hamilton Academical	38	15	7	16	77	74	+3	37
7	St Johnstone	38	15	7	16	70	81	−11	37
8	Kilmarnock	38	14	7	17	69	64	+5	35
9	Third Lanark	38	15	5	18	63	65	−2	35
10	Partick Thistle	38	12	10	16	64	72	−8	34
11	Arbroath	38	11	11	16	46	69	−23	33
12	Dundee	38	11	10	17	67	80	−13	32
13	Queen's Park	38	11	10	17	58	75	−17	32
14	Dunfermline Athletic	38	12	8	18	67	92	−25	32
15	Queen of the South	38	11	9	18	54	72	−18	31
16	Albion Rovers	38	13	4	21	69	92	−23	30
17	Hibernian	38	11	7	20	56	82	−26	29
18	Clyde	38	10	8	20	63	84	−21	28
19	Airdrieonians	38	9	9	20	68	91	−23	27
20	Ayr United	38	11	3	24	53	98	−45	25

Source: RSSSF

== 1936-1937 ==
Manager: John 'Sailor' Hunter

=== Scottish First Division ===
Pos	Team	Pld	W	D	L	GF	GA	GD	Pts
1	Rangers	38	26	9	3	88	32	+56	61
2	Aberdeen	38	23	8	7	89	44	+45	54
3	Celtic	38	22	8	8	89	58	+31	52
4	Motherwell	38	22	7	9	96	54	+42	51
5	Heart of Midlothian	38	24	3	11	99	60	+39	51
6	Third Lanark	38	20	6	12	79	61	+18	46
7	Falkirk	38	19	6	13	98	66	+32	44
8	Hamilton Academical	38	18	5	15	91	96	−5	41
9	Dundee	38	12	15	11	58	69	−11	39
10	Clyde	38	16	6	16	59	70	−11	38
11	Kilmarnock	38	14	9	15	60	70	−10	37
12	St Johnstone	38	14	8	16	74	68	+6	36
13	Partick Thistle	38	11	12	15	73	68	+5	34
14	Arbroath	38	13	5	20	57	84	−27	31
15	Queen's Park	38	9	12	17	51	77	−26	30
16	St Mirren	38	11	7	20	68	81	−13	29
17	Hibernian	38	6	13	19	54	83	−29	25
18	Queen of the South	38	8	8	22	49	95	−46	24
19	Dunfermline Athletic	38	5	11	22	65	98	−33	21
20	Albion Rovers	38	5	6	27	53	116	−63	16

Source: RSSSF

== 1937-1938 ==
Manager: John 'Sailor' Hunter

=== Scottish First Division ===
Pos	Team	Pld	W	D	L	GF	GA	GD	Pts
1	Celtic	38	27	7	4	114	42	+72	61
2	Heart of Midlothian	38	26	6	6	90	50	+40	58
3	Rangers	38	18	13	7	75	49	+26	49
4	Falkirk	38	19	9	10	82	52	+30	47
5	Motherwell	38	17	10	11	78	69	+9	44
6	Aberdeen	38	15	9	14	74	59	+15	39
7	Partick Thistle	38	15	9	14	68	70	−2	39
8	St Johnstone	38	16	7	15	78	81	−3	39
9	Third Lanark	38	11	13	14	68	73	−5	35
10	Hibernian	38	11	13	14	57	65	−8	35
11	Arbroath	38	11	13	14	58	79	−21	35
12	Queen's Park	38	11	12	15	59	74	−15	34
13	Hamilton Academical	38	13	7	18	81	76	+5	33
14	St Mirren	38	14	5	19	58	66	−8	33
15	Clyde	38	10	13	15	68	78	−10	33
16	Queen of the South	38	11	11	16	58	71	−13	33
17	Ayr United	38	9	15	14	66	85	−19	33
18	Kilmarnock	38	12	9	17	65	91	−26	33
19	Dundee	38	13	6	19	70	74	−4	32
20	Morton	38	6	3	29	64	127	−63	15

Source: RSSSF

== 1938-1939 ==
Manager: John 'Sailor' Hunter

=== Scottish First Division ===
Pos	Team	Pld	W	D	L	GF	GA	GD	Pts	Qualification or relegation
1	Rangers	38	25	9	4	112	55	+57	59	
2	Celtic	38	20	8	10	99	53	+46	48	
3	Aberdeen	38	20	6	12	91	61	+30	46	
4	Heart of Midlothian	38	20	5	13	98	70	+28	45	
5	Falkirk	38	19	7	12	73	63	+10	45	
6	Queen of the South	38	17	9	12	70	64	+6	43	
7	Hamilton Academical	38	18	5	15	67	71	−4	41	
8	St Johnstone (Note: Team remained in Division One for the abandoned 1939–40 season, but was not included in Division A when the official competitions resumed in 1946–47.)	38	17	6	15	85	83	+2	40	Relegated to the 1946–47 Division B
9	Clyde	38	17	5	16	78	70	+8	39	
10	Kilmarnock	38	15	9	14	73	86	−13	39	
11	Partick Thistle	38	17	4	17	74	87	−13	38	
12	Motherwell	38	16	5	17	82	86	−4	37	
13	Hibernian	38	14	7	17	68	69	−1	35	
14	Ayr United	38	13	9	16	76	83	−7	35	Relegated to the 1946–47 Division B
15	Third Lanark	38	12	8	18	80	96	−16	32	
16	Albion Rovers	38	12	6	20	65	90	−25	30	Relegated to the 1946–47 Division B
17	Arbroath	38	11	8	19	54	75	−21	30	Relegated to the 1946–47 Division B
18	St Mirren	38	11	7	20	57	80	−23	29	
19	Queen's Park (Note: Team was relegated to Division Two for the abandoned 1939–40 season, but were included in Division A when the official competitions resumed in 1946–47.)	38	11	5	22	57	83	−26	27	
20	Raith Rovers (Note: Team relegated to Division Two in 1939–40 and was also in Division B in 1946–47.)	38	10	2	26	65	99	−34	22	Relegated to the 1946–47 Division B

Source: RSSSF

== 1939-1940 ==
Manager: John 'Sailor' Hunter

=== Scottish First Division ===
(cancelled due to World War II)

Pos	Team	Pld	W	D	L	GF	GA	GD	PTS
1	Rangers	5	4	1	0	14	3	11	9
2	Falkirk	5	4	0	1	20	10	10	8
3	Heart of Midlothian	5	2	2	1	14	9	5	6
4	Aberdeen	5	3	0	2	9	9	0	6
5	Partick Thistle	5	2	2	1	7	7	0	6
6	Celtic	5	3	0	2	7	8	–1	6
7	Albion Rovers	5	2	1	2	12	7	5	5
8	Motherwell	5	2	1	2	14	12	2	5
9	Third Lanark	5	2	1	2	9	8	1	5
10	Kilmarnock	5	2	1	2	10	9	1	5
11	Queen of the South	5	2	1	2	10	9	1	5
12	St Mirren	5	1	3	1	8	8	0	5
13	Hamilton Academical	5	2	1	2	7	11	–4	5
14	Arbroath	5	2	0	3	9	9	0	4
15	St Johnstone	5	2	0	3	7	8	–1	4
16	Hibernian	5	2	0	3	11	13	–2	4
17	Alloa Athletic	5	2	0	3	8	13	–5	4
18	Ayr United	5	2	0	3	10	17	–7	4
19	Clyde	5	1	0	4	10	14	–4	2
20	Cowdenbeath	5	1	0	4	6	18	–12	2

League was suspended on 2 September 1939. Britain declared war the following day. The team participated in the 1939–40 Scottish War Emergency League.

=== Scottish Cup ===
Suspended due to the outbreak of World War II, Scottish War Emergency Cup replaced it; Motherwell reached the Semi–finals.

=== Other Honours ===
Lanarkshire Cup winners

== 1940-1941 ==
Manager: John 'Sailor' Hunter

=== Southern League ===
Pos	Team	Pld	W	D	L	GF	GA	GD	Pts
1	Rangers (C)	30	21	4	5	79	33	+46	46
2	Clyde	30	18	7	5	99	61	+38	43
3	Hibernian	30	14	7	9	74	61	+13	35
4	Airdrieonians	30	13	8	9	75	62	+13	34
5	Celtic	30	14	6	10	48	40	+8	34
6	Falkirk	30	13	7	10	78	73	+5	33
7	St Mirren	30	12	8	10	55	57	−2	32
8	Motherwell	30	13	4	13	73	65	+8	30
9	Heart of Midlothian	30	12	5	13	64	71	−7	29
10	Morton	30	9	11	10	67	62	+5	29
11	Hamilton Academical	30	11	6	13	67	75	−8	28
12	Partick Thistle	30	9	8	13	55	62	−7	26
13	Third Lanark	30	9	7	14	56	80	−24	25
14	Dumbarton	30	10	4	16	58	78	−20	24
15	Albion Rovers	30	6	5	19	45	80	−35	17
16	Queen's Park	30	6	3	21	46	79	−33	15

Source: Scottish Football History – Southern Football League
Rules for classification: 1) points; 2) goal difference; 3) number of goals scored.
(C) Champions

=== Summer Cup ===
First Round

7 June 1941

Motherwell	2–2	Dumbarton

Fir Park, Motherwell
14 June 1941

Dumbarton	3–0	Motherwell

Dumbarton win 5–2 on aggregate

== 1941-1942 ==
Manager: John 'Sailor' Hunter

=== Southern League ===
Pos	Team	Pld	W	D	L	GF	GA	GD	Pts
1	Rangers (C)	30	22	4	4	97	35	+62	48
2	Hibernian	30	18	4	8	85	46	+39	40
3	Celtic	30	15	9	6	69	50	+19	39
4	Motherwell	30	16	3	11	76	62	+14	35
5	Clyde	30	13	6	11	79	75	+4	32
6	Heart of Midlothian	30	14	4	12	85	72	+13	32
7	Falkirk	30	13	4	13	60	72	−12	30
8	Third Lanark	30	14	2	14	79	90	−11	30
9	Morton	30	12	5	13	60	54	+6	29
10	Queen's Park	30	11	5	14	55	56	−1	27
11	St Mirren	30	10	7	13	60	82	−22	27
12	Dumbarton	30	11	4	15	73	90	−17	26
13	Partick Thistle	30	8	10	12	68	70	−2	26
14	Airdrieonians	30	10	4	16	57	76	−19	24
15	Albion Rovers	30	8	5	17	68	97	−29	21
16	Hamilton Academical	30	5	4	21	56	100	−44	14

Source: Scottish Football History – Southern Football League
Rules for classification: 1) points; 2) goal difference; 3) number of goals scored.
(C) Champions

=== Summer Cup ===
First Round

30 May 1942

Dumbarton	1–0	Motherwell

6 June 1942

Motherwell	4–2	Dumbarton

Fir Park, Motherwell

Motherwell win 4–3 on aggregate

Second Round

13 June 1942

Celtic	1–2	Motherwell

Celtic Park, Glasgow
20 June 1942

Motherwell	2–1	Celtic

Fir Park, Motherwell

Motherwell win 4–2 on aggregate

Semi–final

27 June 1942

Hibernian	3–1	Motherwell

Tynecastle, Edinburgh

== 1942-1943 ==
Manager: John 'Sailor' Hunter

=== Southern League ===
Pos	Team	Pld	W	D	L	GF	GA	GD	Pts
1	Rangers (C)	30	22	6	2	89	23	+66	50
2	Morton	30	20	5	5	81	48	+33	45
3	Hibernian	30	19	6	5	86	40	+46	44
4	Clyde	30	17	5	8	78	55	+23	39
5	Motherwell	30	15	4	11	60	54	+6	34
6	Hamilton Academical	30	14	5	11	60	67	−7	33
7	Heart of Midlothian	30	12	7	11	68	64	+4	31
8	Falkirk	30	12	6	12	68	58	+10	30
9	Celtic	30	10	8	12	61	76	−15	28
10	Dumbarton	30	11	6	13	76	76	0	28
11	Partick Thistle	30	9	8	13	63	67	−4	26
12	St Mirren	30	8	5	17	49	78	−29	21
13	Third Lanark	30	8	4	18	58	83	−25	20
14	Queen's Park	30	7	4	19	55	76	−21	18
15	Airdrieonians	30	7	3	20	55	97	−42	17
16	Albion Rovers	30	6	4	20	53	99	−46	16

Source: Scottish Football History – Southern Football League
Rules for classification: 1) points; 2) goal difference; 3) number of goals scored.
(C) Champions

=== Summer Cup ===
First Round

29 May 1943

Motherwell	2–2	Celtic

Fir Park, Motherwell
5 June 1943

Celtic	3–2	Motherwell

Celtic Park, Glasgow

Celtic win 5–4 on aggregate

== 1943-1944 ==
Manager: John 'Sailor' Hunter

=== Southern League ===
Pos	Team	Pld	W	D	L	GF	GA	GD	Pts
1	Rangers (C)	30	23	4	3	90	27	+63	50
2	Celtic	30	18	7	5	71	43	+28	43
3	Hibernian	30	17	4	9	72	54	+18	38
4	Heart of Midlothian	30	14	7	9	67	50	+17	35
5	Dumbarton	30	13	6	11	54	58	−4	32
6	Motherwell	30	12	8	10	69	53	+16	32
7	Clyde	30	13	5	12	62	58	+4	31
8	Morton	32	12	8	12	63	61	+2	32
9	Hamilton Academical	30	13	3	14	80	88	−8	29
10	Partick Thistle	30	11	5	14	62	66	−4	27
11	Queen's Park	30	10	6	14	64	75	−11	26
12	Falkirk	30	10	5	15	79	80	−1	25
13	St Mirren	30	9	7	14	58	78	−20	25
14	Airdrieonians	30	9	5	16	54	72	−18	23
15	Albion Rovers	30	7	3	20	43	85	−42	17
16	Third Lanark	30	7	3	20	60	100	−40	17

Source: The Celtic Wiki – Southern Football League
Rules for classification: 1) points; 2) goal difference; 3) number of goals scored.
(C) Champions

=== Summer Cup ===
First Round

4 June 1944

Hamilton Academical	2–1	Motherwell

Douglas Park, Hamilton
10 June 1944

Motherwell	8–0	Hamilton Academical

Fir Park, Motherwell

Motherwell win 9–2 on aggregate

Second Round

17 June 1944

St Mirren	2–3	Motherwell

Love Street, Paisley
24 June 1944

Motherwell	4–0	St Mirren

Fir Park, Motherwell

Motherwell win 7–2 on aggregate

Semi–final

1 July 1944

Motherwell	3–1	Falkirk

Final

8 July 1944

Motherwell	1–0	Clyde

Hampden Park, Glasgow

== 1944-1945 ==
Manager: John 'Sailor' Hunter

=== Southern League ===
Pos	Team	Pld	W	D	L	GF	GA	GD	Pts
1	Rangers (C)	30	23	3	4	88	27	+61	49
2	Celtic	30	20	2	8	70	42	+28	42
3	Motherwell	30	18	5	7	83	54	+29	41
4	Clyde	30	18	0	12	80	61	+19	36
5	Heart of Midlothian	30	14	7	9	75	60	+15	35
6	Hibernian	30	15	5	10	69	51	+18	35
7	Morton	30	16	1	13	71	60	+11	33
8	Falkirk	30	14	3	13	67	57	+10	31
9	Hamilton Academical	30	12	5	13	77	86	−9	29
10	Queen's Park	30	12	4	14	60	62	−2	28
11	Partick Thistle	30	12	1	17	55	74	−19	25
12	Third Lanark	30	11	3	16	55	65	−10	25
13	Dumbarton (R)	30	9	3	18	51	84	−33	21
14	St Mirren	30	7	6	17	45	71	−26	20
15	Albion Rovers (R)	30	7	2	21	42	104	−62	16
16	Airdrieonians (R)	30	4	6	20	43	73	−30	14

Source: The Celtic Wiki – Southern Football League
Rules for classification: 1) points; 2) goal difference; 3) number of goals scored.
(C) Champions; (R) Relegated

== 1945-1946 ==
Manager: John 'Sailor' Hunter

=== Southern League ===
Pos	Team	Pld	W	D	L	GF	GA	GD	Pts
1	Rangers (C)	30	22	4	4	85	41	+44	48
2	Hibernian	30	17	6	7	67	37	+30	40
3	Aberdeen	30	16	6	8	73	41	+32	38
4	Celtic	30	12	11	7	55	44	+11	35
5	Clyde	30	11	9	10	64	54	+10	31
6	Motherwell	30	11	9	10	54	55	−1	31
7	Heart of Midlothian	30	11	8	11	63	57	+6	30
8	Queen's Park	30	11	8	11	60	60	0	30
9	Third Lanark	30	14	2	14	63	68	−5	30
10	Morton	30	9	11	10	72	69	+3	29
11	Falkirk	30	11	5	14	62	70	−8	27
12	Partick Thistle	30	11	4	15	54	65	−11	26
13	Queen of the South	30	9	6	15	62	82	−20	24
14	St Mirren	30	9	5	16	54	70	−16	23
15	Kilmarnock	30	7	8	15	56	87	−31	22
16	Hamilton Academical	30	5	6	19	44	88	−44	16

(C) Champions

== Publications ==
Graham Barnstaple and Keith Brown (2004). "'Well Again! The Official History of Motherwell Football Club 1886-2004". Yore Publications. ISBN 978-0-9547830-2-0
Alex Smith (2003). "Motherwell: Champions of Scotland 1931-32". Desert Island Books. ISBN 1-874287-73-2
