= Jimmy Kirk (footballer, born 1913) =

Scottish footballer

Personal information
- Full name: James McEwan Kirk
- Date of birth: 4 November 1913
- Place of birth: Wishaw, Scotland
- Date of death: 1963 (aged 49–50)
- Place of death: Dennistoun, Scotland
- Position: Right back

Senior career*
Years	Team	Apps	(Gls)
–	Blantyre Victoria		
1934–1945	Clyde	127	(2)

International career
1940	Scotland (wartime)	1	(0)
- * Club domestic league appearances and goals

James McEwan Kirk (4 November 1913 – 1963) was a Scottish footballer who played for Clyde as a right back. He won the Scottish Cup with the club in 1939 after suffering disappointment when the team fell at the semi-final stage in both 1936 and 1937. In 2018, Kirk's winner's medal reached a price of £1,600 at auction.

His career was curtailed by World War II, during which he was selected for Scotland in an unofficial international against a League of Ireland XI in April 1940.
