= Jack Goldsborough =

English footballer

Personal information
- Full name: John Goldsborough
- Date of birth: 31 July 1892
- Place of birth: Sheffield, England
- Date of death: 7 December 1952 (aged 60)
- Place of death: Sheffield
- Height: 5 ft 8 in (1.73 m)
- Position: Goalkeeper

Senior career*
Years	Team	Apps	(Gls)
- Industry (Sheffield)
1913–1920	Lincoln City	36	(0)
- Boston Town
1922–19??	Llanelly		

Managerial career
- Llanelly
- * Club domestic league appearances and goals

John Goldsborough (31 July 1892 – 7 December 1952) was an English footballer who made 36 appearances in the Football League playing for Lincoln City as a goalkeeper. He went on to play for Boston Town, and in 1922 joined Llanelly as player/trainer. He later became Llanelly manager, in which role he was responsible for Jock Stein signing for the club in 1950.

To recognise 25 years service at Llanelly, a benefit match was held for him on 14 June 1947 which saw 12,000 spectators pack into Stebonheath Park to see Cardiff City beat an International XI captained by Billy Hughes. He resigned his post as manager in 1948 following a difference of opinion with the club's committee but was reappointed in May 1949.

After leaving Llanelly, Goldsborough returned to his native Sheffield and lived in Woodhouse Mill. On 7 December 1952 he died in the Sheffield Royal Hospital; he was buried in Sheffield Woodhouse Cemetery on 11 December 1952.
