= 1938–39 Scottish Cup =

Tournament details
- Country: Scotland

Final positions
- Champions: Clyde
- Runners-up: Motherwell

The 1938–39 Scottish Cup was the 61st staging of Scotland's most prestigious football knockout competition. This was the last edition to be played until 1946-47, as World War II forced all major football competitions in the country to be postponed. The Cup was won for the first time by Clyde, who defeated Motherwell in the final.

== First round ==
Home team	Score	Away team
Aberdeen	1 – 0	Albion Rovers
Alloa Athletic	2 – 1	Ayr United
Blairgowrie	3 – 2	Dumbarton
Bo'ness United	1 – 4	Hamilton Academical
Burntisland	3 – 8	Celtic
Clyde	2 – 0	St Johnstone
Cowdenbeath	3 – 3	Partick Thistle
Dundee	2 – 0	St Bernard's
Dundee United	2 – 0	Stenhousemuir
Duns	4 – 1	Girvan
East Fife	1 – 2	Montrose
Edinburgh City	3 – 3	Stranraer
Falkirk	5 – 0	Brechin City
Falkirk Amateurs	2 – 4	Elgin City
Forfar Athletic	0 – 3	Hibernian
Hearts	14 – 2	Penicuik Athletic
Huntly	1 – 8	Motherwell
Kilmarnock	6 – 1	Berwick Rangers
King's Park	5 – 5	Babcock & Wilcox
Leith Athletic	0 – 2	Airdrieonians
Nithsdale Wanderers	5 – 5	Buckie Thistle
Queen of the South	5 – 4	Arbroath
Queen's Park	4 – 1	St Cuthbert Wanderers
Raith Rovers	0 – 1	Rangers
St Mirren	7 – 0	East Stirlingshire
Third Lanark	8 – 2	Clachnacuddin

=== Replays ===
Home team	Score	Away team
Buckie Thistle	5 – 2	Nithsdale Wanderers
Babcock & Wilcox	3 – 2	Kings Park
Partick Thistle	1 – 2	Cowdenbeath
Stranraer	1 – 2	Edinburgh City

== Second round ==
Home team	Score	Away team
Aberdeen	5 – 1	Queen's Park
Blairgowrie	3 – 3	Buckie Thistle
Dundee	0 – 0	Clyde
Dundee United	1 – 5	Motherwell
Dunfermline Athletic	2 – 0	Duns
Falkirk	7 – 0	Airdrieonians
Hearts	14 – 1	Elgin City
Hibernian	3 – 1	Kilmarnock
Montrose	1 – 7	Celtic
Queen of the South	5 – 0	Babcock & Wilcox
Rangers	2 – 0	Hamilton Academical
Third Lanark	3 – 0	Cowdenbeath
Edinburgh City	1 – 3	St Mirren

=== Replays ===
Home team	Score	Away team
Buckie Thistle	4 – 1	Blairgowrie
Clyde	1 – 0	Dundee

== Third round ==
Home team	Score	Away team
Buckie Thistle	0 – 6	Third Lanark
Dunfermline Athletic	1 – 1	Alloa Athletic
Falkirk	2 – 3	Aberdeen
Hearts	2 – 2	Celtic
Motherwell	4 – 2	St Mirren
Rangers	1 – 4	Clyde

=== Replays ===
Home team	Score	Away team
Alloa Athletic	3 – 2	Dunfermline Athletic
Celtic	2 – 1	Hearts

== Quarter-finals ==
Home team	Score	Away team
Aberdeen	2 – 0	Queen of the South
Clyde	1 – 0	Third Lanark
Hibernian	3 – 1	Alloa Athletic
Motherwell	3 – 1	Celtic

== Semi-finals ==
25 March 1939

Aberdeen	1–1	Motherwell

Attendance: 81,756

25 March 1939

Clyde	1–0	Hibernian

Attendance: 39,812

=== Replays ===
29 March 1939

Motherwell	3–1	Aberdeen

Attendance: 40,539

== Final ==
22 April 1939

Clyde	4–0	Motherwell
Martin; Wallace; Noble

Hampden Park, Glasgow
Attendance: 94,000

=== Teams ===
CLYDE:
GK	(Scotland) Jock Brown
RB	(Scotland) Jimmy Kirk
LB	(Scotland) Jimmy Hickie
RH	(Scotland) Harry Beaton (Captain)
CH	(Northern Ireland) Eddie Falloon
LH	(Republic of Ireland) Ned Weir
RW	(Scotland) Tom Robertson
IR	(Scotland) Davie Noble
CF	(Scotland) Willie Martin
IL	(South Africa) Dougie Wallace
LW	(Scotland) John Gillies
Manager:
(Scotland) Paddy Travers

MOTHERWELL:
GK	(Scotland) Andrew Murray
RB	(Scotland) Hugh Wales
LB	(Wales) Ben Ellis
RH	(Scotland) Tommy McKenzie
CH	(Scotland) John Blair
LH	(Scotland) Willie Telfer
RW	(Scotland) Duncan Ogilvie
IR	(Scotland) Hutton Bremner
CF	(Scotland) Davie Mathie
IL	(Scotland) George Stevenson
LW	(Scotland) Johnny McCulloch
Manager:
(Scotland) John 'Sailor' Hunter

== See also ==
- 1938–39 in Scottish football
