= 1938–39 Scottish Division One =

40th season of top-tier football league in Scotland

Scottish Division One
- Season: 1938–39
- Champions: Rangers

The 1938–39 Scottish Division One was the last season of competitive football in Scotland before World War II. The league championship was won by Rangers by eleven points over nearest rival Celtic.

== League table ==
| Pos | Team | Pld | W | D | L | GF | GA | GD | Pts | Qualification or relegation |
|---|---|---|---|---|---|---|---|---|---|---|
| 1 | Rangers | 38 | 25 | 9 | 4 | 112 | 55 | +57 | 59 | |
| 2 | Celtic | 38 | 20 | 8 | 10 | 99 | 53 | +46 | 48 | |
| 3 | Aberdeen | 38 | 20 | 6 | 12 | 91 | 61 | +30 | 46 | |
| 4 | Heart of Midlothian | 38 | 20 | 5 | 13 | 98 | 70 | +28 | 45 | |
| 5 | Falkirk | 38 | 19 | 7 | 12 | 73 | 63 | +10 | 45 | |
| 6 | Queen of the South | 38 | 17 | 9 | 12 | 70 | 64 | +6 | 43 | |
| 7 | Hamilton Academical | 38 | 18 | 5 | 15 | 67 | 71 | −4 | 41 | |
| 8 | St Johnstone (Note: Team remained in Division One for the abandoned 1939–40 season, but was not included in Division A when the official competitions resumed in 1946–47.) | 38 | 17 | 6 | 15 | 85 | 83 | +2 | 40 | Relegated to the 1946–47 Division B |
| 9 | Clyde | 38 | 17 | 5 | 16 | 78 | 70 | +8 | 39 | |
| 10 | Kilmarnock | 38 | 15 | 9 | 14 | 73 | 86 | −13 | 39 | |
| 11 | Partick Thistle | 38 | 17 | 4 | 17 | 74 | 87 | −13 | 38 | |
| 12 | Motherwell | 38 | 16 | 5 | 17 | 82 | 86 | −4 | 37 | |
| 13 | Hibernian | 38 | 14 | 7 | 17 | 68 | 69 | −1 | 35 | |
| 14 | Ayr United | 38 | 13 | 9 | 16 | 76 | 83 | −7 | 35 | Relegated to the 1946–47 Division B |
| 15 | Third Lanark | 38 | 12 | 8 | 18 | 80 | 96 | −16 | 32 | |
| 16 | Albion Rovers | 38 | 12 | 6 | 20 | 65 | 90 | −25 | 30 | Relegated to the 1946–47 Division B |
| 17 | Arbroath | 38 | 11 | 8 | 19 | 54 | 75 | −21 | 30 | Relegated to the 1946–47 Division B |
| 18 | St Mirren | 38 | 11 | 7 | 20 | 57 | 80 | −23 | 29 | |
| 19 | Queen's Park (Note: Team was relegated to Division Two for the abandoned 1939–40 season, but were included in Division A when the official competitions resumed in 1946–47.) | 38 | 11 | 5 | 22 | 57 | 83 | −26 | 27 | |
| 20 | Raith Rovers (Note: Team relegated to Division Two in 1939–40 and was also in Division B in 1946–47.) | 38 | 10 | 2 | 26 | 65 | 99 | −34 | 22 | Relegated to the 1946–47 Division B |

Source: RSSSF

== Results ==
| Home \ Away | ABE | ALB | ARB | AYR | CEL | CLY | FAL | HAM | HOM | HIB | KIL | MOT | PAR | QOS | QPA | RAI | RAN | STJ | STM | THI |
|---|---|---|---|---|---|---|---|---|---|---|---|---|---|---|---|---|---|---|---|---|
| Aberdeen | | 2–1 | 4–0 | 5–2 | 3–1 | 1–2 | 4–1 | 5–0 | 4–3 | 6–1 | 1–2 | 0–0 | 3–0 | 4–3 | 2–1 | 6–3 | 2–0 | 3–0 | 3–2 | 6–1 |
| Albion Rovers | 1–0 | | 3–2 | 3–3 | 1–8 | 3–0 | 0–3 | 5–0 | 0–1 | 0–1 | 6–1 | 3–4 | 3–1 | 2–1 | 1–3 | 2–1 | 2–7 | 2–3 | 2–1 | 2–4 |
| Arbroath | 0–2 | 3–2 | | 3–0 | 0–2 | 3–0 | 1–2 | 4–1 | 1–1 | 2–4 | 4–1 | 2–0 | 4–0 | 1–1 | 3–1 | 0–4 | 3–3 | 3–1 | 2–1 | 0–5 |
| Ayr United | 3–3 | 1–1 | 4–1 | | 1–4 | 2–4 | 3–0 | 1–1 | 3–1 | 3–1 | 2–2 | 6–1 | 3–0 | 2–3 | 2–0 | 2–1 | 3–4 | 0–0 | 2–3 | 3–3 |
| Celtic | 1–2 | 4–1 | 2–0 | 3–3 | | 3–1 | 1–2 | 1–2 | 2–2 | 5–4 | 9–1 | 1–3 | 3–1 | 5–1 | 0–1 | 6–1 | 6–2 | 1–1 | 3–2 | 6–1 |
| Clyde | 1–1 | 0–0 | 2–0 | 3–1 | 1–4 | | 2–4 | 4–3 | 2–6 | 3–0 | 5–1 | 4–0 | 4–1 | 1–1 | 2–3 | 2–3 | 1–1 | 3–1 | 2–0 | 4–1 |
| Falkirk | 1–3 | 4–3 | 2–0 | 3–1 | 1–1 | 0–2 | | 4–0 | 0–1 | 1–1 | 4–0 | 2–1 | 2–5 | 2–1 | 1–0 | 6–1 | 2–2 | 1–1 | 2–1 | 4–0 |
| Hamilton Academical | 1–0 | 2–1 | 1–1 | 2–0 | 0–1 | 1–2 | 1–3 | | 4–1 | 4–1 | 3–1 | 2–1 | 4–0 | 1–0 | 3–1 | 1–3 | 2–1 | 2–1 | 1–2 | 4–3 |
| Heart of Midlothian | 5–2 | 2–0 | 1–1 | 2–0 | 1–5 | 2–0 | 6–2 | 2–3 | | 0–1 | 2–1 | 4–0 | 5–0 | 1–2 | 8–3 | 2–1 | 1–3 | 8–2 | 5–2 | 4–2 |
| Hibernian | 5–0 | 1–2 | 1–1 | 2–3 | 1–0 | 1–1 | 3–0 | 2–2 | 4–0 | | 0–1 | 2–1 | 1–2 | 2–3 | 3–1 | 2–1 | 1–1 | 5–2 | 6–1 | 1–1 |
| Kilmarnock | 0–3 | 4–2 | 1–1 | 2–2 | 0–0 | 1–4 | 1–1 | 2–2 | 4–1 | 0–1 | | 1–3 | 4–2 | 1–1 | 3–0 | 4–2 | 3–1 | 1–0 | 3–2 | 5–2 |
| Motherwell | 2–2 | 3–1 | 4–0 | 1–2 | 2–3 | 3–2 | 1–3 | 2–3 | 4–2 | 3–2 | 5–2 | | 4–3 | 8–5 | 2–0 | 2–4 | 0–5 | 3–1 | 2–1 | 5–1 |
| Partick Thistle | 2–1 | 1–3 | 3–1 | 2–3 | 0–0 | 2–1 | 2–0 | 3–1 | 3–1 | 4–0 | 4–3 | 4–2 | | 1–2 | 2–2 | 2–1 | 2–4 | 1–4 | 3–0 | 4–1 |
| Queen of the South | 1–1 | 3–3 | 2–0 | 6–1 | 1–1 | 3–2 | 2–0 | 3–0 | 0–1 | 2–1 | 2–0 | 4–3 | 0–0 | | 3–2 | 4–2 | 1–1 | 1–1 | 1–0 | 1–2 |
| Queen's Park | 2–1 | 1–2 | 1–0 | 1–3 | 1–2 | 4–2 | 1–1 | 1–2 | 4–1 | 3–2 | 1–5 | 0–0 | 1–1 | 2–0 | | 3–0 | 2–3 | 2–3 | 0–0 | 1–4 |
| Raith Rovers | 3–2 | 1–1 | 1–3 | 3–1 | 4–0 | 0–2 | 0–1 | 2–1 | 1–2 | 1–2 | 2–3 | 0–1 | 2–4 | 1–3 | 4–5 | | 0–2 | 5–6 | 1–3 | 2–2 |
| Rangers | 5–2 | 5–0 | 4–0 | 4–1 | 2–1 | 2–0 | 2–1 | 3–2 | 1–1 | 5–2 | 2–2 | 2–2 | 4–1 | 4–1 | 1–0 | 4–0 | | 4–2 | 3–0 | 5–1 |
| St Johnstone | 1–0 | 4–0 | 4–3 | 0–1 | 1–1 | 3–2 | 6–3 | 0–2 | 1–7 | 2–1 | 1–3 | 2–1 | 7–0 | 3–0 | 4–1 | 1–2 | 3–3 | | 6–2 | 4–0 |
| St Mirren | 3–1 | 1–1 | 1–1 | 2–1 | 2–1 | 2–4 | 1–2 | 2–1 | 1–1 | 0–0 | 0–1 | 2–2 | 1–4 | 2–0 | 2–1 | 1–2 | 1–5 | 4–0 | | 3–2 |
| Third Lanark | 1–1 | 4–0 | 3–0 | 3–2 | 0–2 | 3–1 | 2–2 | 2–2 | 1–4 | 2–0 | 3–3 | 3–1 | 2–4 | 0–1 | 5–1 | 5–0 | 1–2 | 1–3 | 3–3 | |

Legend: Blue = home team win; Yellow = draw; Red = away team win.
