= Llanelli Town A.F.C. =

Association football club in Llanelli, Wales

Llanelli Town AFC
- Full name: Llanelli Town; Association Football Club
- Nickname: The Reds
- Founded: 1896; 2013 (refounded)
- Ground: Stebonheath Park; Llanelli
- Capacity: 3,700 (1,005 seated)
- Chairman: Wayne Stephens
- Manager: Lee John
- League: Cymru South
- 2025–26: Cymru Premier, 12th of 12 (relegated)
Home colours	Away colours

Llanelli Town Association Football Club (Welsh: Clwb Pêl-droed Llanelli) are a semi-professional Welsh football club that plays in the Cymru South.

The original club was wound up on 22 April 2013 at the High Court in London following a petition presented by HM Revenue and Customs. They were reformed later that year as Llanelli Town AFC and played in the Welsh Premier League. The club finished 12th in the 2018–19 Welsh Premier League season (bottom of the league), and were relegated after failing to gain a Tier 1 Licence. They played in the Cymru South for the 2019–20 season.

== Background ==
The team is based at Stebonheath Park from 1922, having previously played at the Halfway Park athletics ground.

Formed in 1896, the club's first honour was the Welsh League division one title in 1913–14 with further wins coming in 1929–30 and 1932–33. Llanelli made several attempts to join The Football League, in 1922, 1923, 1929, 1930, 1931, 1932, 1933, 1947, 1950 and 1951. Despite making an effort to turn professional, the club was not elected. The closest they came was in 1933, where the club received 20 votes compared to 26 for Newport County and 45 for Swindon Town who were re-elected to the Football League Third Division South. Llanelli was a founding member of the Welsh Premier League in 1992, but after only four seasons suffered relegation. Promotion back to the top division was achieved in 1998–99, but 2002–03 saw the team demoted only to return to the top-flight for the 2004–05 season. In 2005 a wealthy business man and his consortium, The Jesco group bought the club. Since then, the club's fortunes have transformed remarkably on the pitch. They have played in Europe for 7 consecutive seasons, they won the Welsh premier league and Loosemores challenge cup in 2008 and won the Welsh Cup in 2011.

2012–13 was difficult financially with three petitions to wind the club up presented by HM Revenue and Customs.

The club was wound up on 22 April 2013 at the High Court in London following a petition presented by HM Revenue and Customs. The formation of a 'phoenix club' of Llanelli Town AFC meant the town of Llanelli was still represented in Welsh football. The new team started in the Welsh Third Division for the 2013–14 season. In 2014-15 they were crowned Third Division champions and as such gained promotion to the Welsh Second Division. In April 2018 the club was crowned champions of the Second Division. After an appeal to the Football Association of Wales against a decision not the grant the club a Tier 1 licence, the club returned to the Welsh Premier League for the 2018–19 season.

== History ==
The game of Association Football was introduced to the townspeople of Llanelli when workers from Staffordshire migrated to the town to work in the 'newest' of the town industries – the Pottery works – from 1892 to 1920. As they were unfamiliar with rugby union, workers founded a team to play friendlies against other teams from the various pottery works which had been set up in Swansea and Neath. However, by 1896 interest had waned due in the main to those initial workers returning home, having successfully instructed their local co-workers in the intricacies of the pottery world. The first playing area had been at 'Cae Blake' in the Furnace area of the town, but when the new Peoples Park in the middle of the town was opened as a recreation area the team had transferred to this new ground. By 1904, with more and more clubs being formed in South Wales, soccer fans decided to resurrect the club under the managership of Bert Andrews, from Ironbridge, Shropshire, who had remained in the town working in an administrative post at the Llanelli Pottery. The club entered the Swansea and District League, and played their home matches first at Tunnel Road and then at Penyfan Fields.

=== The pre-war era ===
In season 1911–12, after seven years of consolidation, Llanelli AFC became League champions and were also losing finalists in the League Cup. This was the spur that was needed to progress even further and led by another immigrant to the town, W T Morris who hailed from Llanidloes and was a leading entrepreneur in the commercial world of Llanelli, the club decided to become fully professional and applied for membership in both the Southern League and the Welsh League. A further move was necessary to entertain the professional game and Halfway Park some two miles from the town centre was chosen as the new venue. This former cycle stadium was the ideal velodrome for Association Football boasting a grand stand and natural banking, and this was the catalyst, which both league structures sought when sanctioning the club's inclusion in the two participating Leagues. Their first season 1912–13 was an immediate success finishing in 6th position of the Southern League and joint 3rd with Swansea Town in the Welsh League. They were also invited to participate in the FA Cup for the first time, reaching the 3rd Qualifying Round before being beaten by Cardiff City at home. The following season they entered also into the Welsh Senior Cup competition and reached the final at the first time of asking, before losing to Wrexham, the eventual winners in the replay at Oswestry after a 0–0 draw at Pontypridd. It was also during this season that the club achieved its best win to date beating Treharris 17–0 at home in a League game.

=== The interwar period ===
In the 1919–20 season the reformed club's formats of pre-war years The 1st team squad played in both leagues, and the club's reserve team participated in the Swansea Senior League. By 1922 it was obvious that a new stadium near the town centre would be needed to join the Football League. A piece of ground in the Stebonheath area of the town was purchased, and plans were made to move the entire club there from Halfway. This was achieved just in time for the 1922–23 season, and Bridgend Town were the first visitors. Later in the season the new ground was formally opened, despite the club's financial problems. After the formal opening, Tottenham Hotspur (the previous season's FA Cup winners) were invited to play, and were even defeated by the home side by 2–1. Later, Burnley and Charlton Athletic were also invited play at Stebonheath Park. They won their matches.

At the end of the successful playing season, the club made its first application, together with Pontypridd Town, to join the Football League, Third Division (South). However, both their applications failedjust failed, and instead both the member clubs up for re-election, Southend United and Exeter City, were re-elected. Over the next three years. Llanelli AFC built up a reputation as one of the leading non-league clubs in Wales.

In 1925 they were the only club to contest every round in the FA Cup from Preliminary to Qualifying and to progress the equivalent of what is now the third round proper: they met Fulham at Craven Cottage and lost by the odd goal. However, by the end of the season the club had built up a large debt, and could not meet their financial obligations to their players The two respective management committees of both teams were forced to resign, and the club's activities temporarily ceased.

By 1928, after three years in the wilderness, the town's football fans decided to resurrect the club. They were supported by the groundsman/caretaker of Stebonheath Park, Jack Goldsborough, who had joined the club in 1922 as a player/trainer. They succeeded in taking over the fixtures of Aberdare Athletic in the Welsh League. Aberdare had also been in financial difficulties and had had to resign from the Welsh League.

Their first season was naturally one of consolidation. They succeeded in gaining a place in the Southern League for the following season. For the next five seasons the club were once again on a high, winning trophies once more and just failing on three other occasions to gain a place in the Football League.

However, attendances were falling and costs were rising, including spending on imported players. They were forced to withdraw from the Southern League for the 1934–35 season. They continued to play in the Welsh League 1st Division, where they remained until the outbreak of World War II. However, they were thrashed many times, including their record defeat by 0–12 by the now defunct Lovells Athletic on Boxing Day 1934.

=== Post-war ===
At the end of World War II, with league football returning to normality, Llanelli AFC returned to the 1st Division of the Welsh League for 1945–46 season and continued in this vein until the 1950 season when with the boom of returning fixtures to a nation starved of highly charged competitive football Llanelli AFC once again gained a place in the prestigious Southern League, together with an influx of Scottish League footballers including one John (Jock) Stein who was to find fame with Glasgow Celtic as a player and manager and a respected manager of both Leeds United and the Scottish National team. Their immediate impact was again one of success gaining FA Cup prowess verses Bristol Rovers in a Third round tie replay in 1950–51 season and before losing in a second replay and a Second Round encounter with Colchester United in 1952–53 season and Northampton Town in the next, but as ever problems were to beset the club once more. Falling gates, indifferent seasons meant fewer people through the turnstiles and by 1958 they had to seek re-election to both the Southern and Welsh League. They were granted a stay in the Southern League whilst had to be relegated in the Welsh League Division II (West). But a shock to the system was to be suffered when the Welsh FA refused to sanction their stay in the Southern League and they were left in limbo with an all-time low for their future for the 1958–59 season. Under the astute managership of Wilf Grant an England B International, promotion was gained in that season and at least they were back in the higher echelon of Welsh League football. Despite their achievements and an upsurge in their finances and an open door to Southern League once again the Welsh FA spurned their pleas after being accepted and they remained 'in situ' in this league until the advent of the League of Wales in 1992–93 season when they became founder members.

=== League of Wales era ===
After an initial successful season the club fell away once more, again due to financial constraints and by the end of the 1995–96 season were relegated once again to the Welsh League. It took a further four years for them to achieve promotion, gaining a place in the League of Wales as runners-up to Ton Pentre who had spurned their right as champions in season 1999–2000.

Following their return to the League of Wales the club had a see-saw existence. In 2003, the club lost its league status, but a successful campaign back in the Welsh League brought a prompt return of Premiership football to Steboneath Park. Disagreements over the playing budget led to the resignation of promotion-winning manager, Neil O'Brien and chairman Robert Jones turned to former Cardiff boss Eddie May. But a disastrous nine-match losing start to the campaign saw Nick Tucker arrive from Taffs Well to take over in mid-October 2004. The Reds gained their first win of the season at the 11th attempt and by the end of the season had hauled themselves into 14th position, a remarkable recovery.

Summer 2005 saw the first full-time footballer at Stebonheath since the Jock Stein era of the 1950s, with eight professionals under Spanish director of football, Lucas Cazorla Luque. Although the Spaniard parted company midway through the season, the Reds went on to finish runners-up and clinch a first-ever place in Europe under manager Peter Nicholas. They became one of the few Welsh clubs to progress past the first round in Europe, beating Swedish outfit Gefle IF, going out bravely in the next round to Danish giants, Odense BK 6–1 on aggregate. Their European exertions affected their league campaign, but despite a mid-season slump, they rallied in the closing stages to clinch third place and an InterToto Cup spot.

The Reds then enjoyed a superb season in 2007–08, clinching their first-ever Welsh Premier title with three games to go and a first appearance in the UEFA Champions League, where they lost to Latvian champions FK Ventspils 4–1 on aggregate, after winning the home leg 1–0. Failure to repeat the feat in the following campaign resulted in the dismissal of manager Nicholas after four years at the helm, he was replaced by veteran defender Andy Legg. Legg's first game in charge was the 1–0 victory over Scottish Premier League side, Motherwell. The Reds lost the return leg 3–0. Legg guided Llanelli to their first ever Welsh cup win by beating Bangor City 4–1 at Parc Y Scarlets, Llanelli.

=== Reformation ===
The club were wound up in April 2013 over an unpaid tax debt amounting to £21,000. Distraught manager Bob Jeffries thought there was only one man to save the club and started making calls to local celebrity multi-millionaire David Craddock, Director of Davies Craddock Limited. David has an endless list of contacts in the football world and is often seen around Britain in VIP rooms of professional clubs. Weekly calls turned into daily calls which he answered in his very busy schedule and when Mr Craddock had a tour of the Stadium, he felt ready to take on the mission.

They were reformed as Llanelli Town later that year and were placed in the Welsh Football League Division Three for the start of the 2013–14 season. They are considered by the FAW to be a direct continuation of the same club.

In the club's first season, 2013–14, they finished in sixth position in Welsh League Division 3 and the following season they finished as Champions, being promoted to play in Division 2. In the third season, 2015–16, they finished in seventh place.

Manager Bob Jeffrey was headhunted to take up a managers position in the USA, so chairman David Craddock consulted with the club coach David Bowen and Sec Neil Dymock and approached former Player Andy Hill who agreed to become the new manager for the 2016–17 season. That season, Llanelli Town won the Double (League champions and League Cup winners).

In the 2017–18 season, success continued when they won the Welsh League Division One title and narrowly lost another Welsh League Cup Final. At this stage most of the players, supporters and Committee wanted to enter the Welsh Premier League. Due to business commitments David Craddock resigned as chairman, but continued his interest to become honorary club president, a position he still holds.

Having gained promotion to the Welsh Premier League for the 2018–19 season, the club finished bottom of the table and were relegated to the newly formed Cymru South for the 2019–20 season. After two seasons finishing in the top half of the league, the club finished league runners-up in both the 2022–23 and 2023–24 seasons, before finishing the 2024–25 season as champions, gaining promotion to the Cymru Premier.

The club's return to the top tier of Welsh league football saw them finish bottom of the table in the 2025–26 season, 13 points adrift of the second bottom club, and they were again relegated back to the Cymru South league.

== Stadium ==
The club's home ground is Stebonheath Park, which has a capacity of 3,700. In recent years, The Reds have played numerous European matches away from their home ground due to its limited seating capacity. Matches have been played at:

- Stradey Park, the former home of the Llanelli Scarlets rugby team
- The Liberty Stadium in Swansea
- Richmond Park, Carmarthen
- Parc y Scarlets, Llanelli

The first ground improvement started in the summer of 2008 by building a seated stand to accommodate 300 supporters. This takes the Stebonheath Park seated capacity to 1,003 – thus making it a UEFA-compliant stadium for European football.

== Llanelli in Europe ==
=== 2006–07 UEFA Cup ===
Llanelli's first ever game in Europe was against Swedish team Gefle IF. Going a goal down early on in the game at the Swedish national stadium, Llanelli rallied and won the game 2–1 thanks to a debut goal from Rhys Griffiths and a goal from Jacob Mingorance. The return leg was played at Stradey Park in front of a crowd of 5,000, it finished 0–0. The draw for the second qualifying round put them up against Danish side Odense Boldklub. The Reds lost the away leg 1–0. The home leg was played at Swansea's Liberty stadium, Antonio Corbishierio put the Reds 1–0 up on the night to bring the aggregate scores level, Odense destroyed Llanelli's hopes of progression by running out 5–1 winners on the night and 6–1 on aggregate.

=== 2007–08 UEFA Intertoto Cup ===
Llanelli qualified for the Intertoto Cup after finishing third in the Welsh Premier League behind The New Saints and Rhyl. The Reds travelled to the Lithuanian capital Vilnius for the first leg of the first-round game against FK Vėtra. Llanelli started the game well, even with a severely depleted squad they managed to take the lead with a fine volley by Andrew Mummford, the brave Reds side went on to lose the game 3–1. A magnificent return leg played at Carmarthen's Richmond Park, saw Llanelli come agonizingly close to qualifying. They took the game from 3–2 down at half time to score a last minute goal to make it 5–3, unfortunately there was not enough time for Llanelli to grab a winner, they went out on away goals with an aggregate score of 6–6. Talismanic striker, Rhys Griffiths bagged a hat trick, Wyn Thomas and Andy Legg got the other two goals.

=== 2008–09 UEFA Champions League ===
Llanelli qualified for the UEFA Champions League after winning the Welsh Premier League. The Reds were drawn against FK Ventspils of Latvia in the first qualifying round. In a close match at a sell out Stebonheath Park, Llanelli ran out 1–0 winners thanks to a goal from defender, Stuart Jones. The Reds then went to Latvia to try to defend this slender lead. Llanelli could not repeat their heroics of the previous week and lost the game 4–0 to bow out 4–1 on aggregate.

=== 2009–10 UEFA Europa League ===
Llanelli's first appearance in the newly formatted Europa League saw them drawn against Scottish Premier League side, Motherwell. The game was played at Airdrie's stadium with a strong contingent making the long journey north from South Wales. The Red's pulled off a major shock by beating the SPL side 1–0 with a first half goal by Stuart Jones. The return leg, which was played at Parc Y Scarlets was a different story. Motherwell, backed by 3000 travelling fans defeated the Reds comfortably, 3–0.

=== 2010–11 UEFA Europa League ===
A second-placed finish in Andy Legg's first season as manager saw Llanelli play European football for the 5th consecutive season. They were drawn against Lithuanian minnows FK Tauras Tauragein the first qualifying round. The first leg, which was played in front of a sell out Steboneath Park crowd finished 2–2, centre backs Wyn Thomas and Stuart Jones got Llanelli's goals, Chris Holloway was also sent off and handed a 2 match ban. The second leg was played at the Lithuanian national football stadium, Tauras took the lead due to some poor defending only for Chris Llewellyn to equalise. Llanelli again conceded from some poor defending, this time from a corner. The battling Reds side equalised once again, a ball over the top led to Jason Bowen beating the offside trap, he raced clear and neatly slid the ball past the Tauras keeper. With extra time fast approaching, Llanelli had Rhys Griffiths and Craig Moses sent off, somewhat controversially. The Tauras players seemed to make a meal with every challenge. Extra time proved too much for the tired Reds side as Tauras ran out 3–2 winners on the night and 5–4 on aggregate.

=== 2011–12 UEFA Europa League ===
Llanelli were drawn against Dinamo Tbilisi. The first leg was played at Parc Y Scarlets. Llanelli, who were missing five key players, stunned the Georgians by taking the game 2–1, with a brace coming from Jordan Follows. Tbilisi pulled a goal back in stoppage time with a penalty. The Reds approached the second leg in with confidence, key players returning and a 2–1 advantage. Hopes of progressing were quickly dashed as a rampant Tbilisi side knocked in 5 goals without reply. Llanelli went out 6–2 on aggregate.

== European record ==
- Q= Qualifying

Season	Competition	Round	Opponents	Home leg	Away leg	Aggregate
2006–07	UEFA Cup	Q1	(Sweden) Gefle IF	0–0	2–1	2–1
2006–07	UEFA Cup	Q2	(Denmark) OB Odense	1–5	0–1	1–6
2007	UEFA Intertoto Cup	Q1	(Lithuania) FK Vetra	5–3	1–3	6–6
2008–09	UEFA Champions League	Q1	(Latvia) FK Ventspils	1–0	0–4	1–4
2009–10	UEFA Europa League	Q1	(Scotland) Motherwell	0–3	1–0	1–3
2010–11	UEFA Europa League	Q1	(Lithuania) Tauras	2–2	2–3	4–5
2011–12	UEFA Europa League	Q2	(Georgia (country)) Dinamo Tbilisi	2–1	0–5	2–6
2012–13	UEFA Europa League	Q1	(Finland) KuPS	1–1	1–2	2–3

== Honours ==
- League of Wales / Welsh Premier League (Step 1)
  - Winners 2007–08
  - Runners-up 2005–06, 2008–09, 2009–10
- Cymru South (Step 2)
  - Winners 2024–25
  - Runners-up 2022–23, 2023–24
- Welsh League Cup
  - Winners 2007–08
  - Runners-up 2010–11
- Welsh Cup
  - Winners 2010–11
  - Runners-up 1913–14, 2007–08
- FAW Premier Cup
  - Runners-up 2007–08
- Southern League (as a top division)
  - Best ever finish Fifth in 1950–51
- Southern League Division 2
  - Best ever finish Third in 1919–20
- Southern League (Western Division)
  - Runners-up 1930–31
- Welsh League Division 1 / (Step 1)
  - Winners 1913–14, 1929–30, 1932–33, 1970–71, 1976–77, 1977–78, 2003–04
  - Runners-up 1930–31, 1933–34, 1959–60, 1972–73, 1996–97, 1998–99
- Welsh League Division 2 West (Step 2)
  - Winners 1957–58
- Welsh League Division 3 (Step 4)
  - Winners 2014–15
- Welsh League Cup
  - Winners 1929–30, 1931–32, 1974–75
  - Runners-up 1930–31, 1933–34, 1948–49, 1959–60, 1960–61, 1989–90, 2003–04
- West Wales Senior Cup
  - Winners 1930–31, 1947–48, 1950–51, 1952–53, 1963–64, 1967–68, 1970–71, 1976–77, 1999–00, 2008–09
  - Runners-up 1924–25, 1931–32, 1934–35, 1938–39, 1948–49, 1953–54, 1954–55, 1955–56, 1957–58, 1959–60, 1961–62, 1964–65, 1965–66, 1966–67, 1971–72, 1972–73, 1977–78, 1978–79, 1989–90, 1990–91, 1998–99
  - Shared 1962–63 (with Swansea Town)

== Players ==
=== Latest squad ===
As of 4 September 2026

Note: Flags indicate national team as defined under FIFA eligibility rules; some limited exceptions apply. Players may hold more than one non-FIFA nationality.

No.	Pos.	Nation	Player
1	GK	WAL	Joseph Massaro
2	DF	WAL	Jack Cooper
3	DF	ENG	Miles John
4	DF	WAL	Jackson Hall
6	DF	WAL	Lee Bevan
7	FW	WAL	Keiran Dawe
8	MF	WAL	McCauley Power (captain)
10	MF	WAL	Keane Whitmore
11	MF	WAL	Michael Morgan
12	DF	WAL	Aidan Hughes
14	DF	WAL	Evan Powell

No.	Pos.	Nation	Player
15	DF	WAL	Jack Goddard
16	MF	WAL	Zac Richards
17	FW	WAL	Karim Hussein
19	DF	WAL	Sonny Parkhouse
21	GK	WAL	Luke Masrani
—	FW	ESP	Nathan Crișan
—	MF	WAL	Osian Dillon
—	DF	WAL	Morgan Evans (on loan from Newport County)
—	DF	WAL	Cole Gibbings
—	MF	WAL	Josh Joda
—	MF	WAL	Ashley Watkins (on loan from Haverfordwest County)

== Managers ==
- (England) Walter Whittaker (1914) - player-manager
- (England) David Ashworth (1930–31)
- (Scotland) Peter O'Rourke (1932–33)
- (England) Jack Goldsborough (19??–48)
- (England) Jack Goldsborough (1949–52)
- (Scotland) Dougie Wallace (1952) - player-coach from 1949
- (Scotland) John Love (1952–54)
- (England) Wilf Grant (1957–58)
- (England) Harry Clarke (1959–62)
- (Scotland) Dougie Wallace (1962–66)
- (Wales) Des Palmer (1966–67)
- (Wales) Gwyn Grant (1967–19??)
- (Wales) Gilbert Lloyd
- (Wales) Wyndham Evans (1983) - player-manager
- (Wales) Wyndham Evans (1987–91) - player-manager/ manager
- (Wales) Alwyn Mainwaring (1992–93)
- (Wales) Gilbert Lloyd (1993–96)
- (Wales) Dudley Lewis (1996) - player-manager
- (Wales) Robbie James (1996–98) - player-manager
- (Wales) Leighton James (1998–00)
- (Wales) John Lewis (2000)
- (Wales) Mark Evans (2000–01)
- (Wales) Gary Proctor (2001)
- (Wales) Ray John (interim) (2001)
- (Wales) Jason Jones (2001–02)
- (Wales) Peter Nicholas (2002)
- (Wales) Leighton James (2002–03)
- (Wales) Neil O'Brien (2003–04)
- (England) Eddie May (2004)
- (Wales) Nicky Tucker (2004–05)
- (Wales) Peter Nicholas (2005–06)
- (Spain) Lucas Cazorla (2006–07)
- (Wales) Peter Nicholas (2007–09)
- (Wales) Andy Legg (2009–12) - player-manager
- (Scotland) Bob Jeffrey (2012–16)
- (Wales) Andrew Hill (2016–19))
- (Wales) Wayne Stephens (2019) - caretaker manager
- (Wales) Mark Dickeson (2019–20)
- (Wales) Andy Legg (2020–21)
- (Wales) Lee John (2021–26)
- (Wales) Terry Boyle - interim manager (2026)
- (Wales) Terry Boyle (2026)
- (Wales) Lee John (2026–date)
