= Davie Mathie =

Scottish footballer

Personal information
- Full name: David Mathie
- Date of birth: 15 August 1919
- Place of birth: Motherwell, Scotland
- Date of death: 3 January 1954 (aged 34)
- Place of death: Motherwell, Scotland
- Height: 5 ft 7 in (1.70 m)
- Position: Centre forward

Senior career*
Years	Team	Apps	(Gls)
- Larkhall Thistle
- Wishaw Juniors
1938–1946	Motherwell	30	(20)
1946	Clyde	5	(2)
1946–1947	Partick Thistle	38	(26)
1947–1950	Motherwell	30	(15)
1950–1951	Llanelli		
1951–1953	Kilmarnock	34	(20)
1953–1954	Workington	2	(0)
Total		139	(83)
- * Club domestic league appearances and goals

Davie Mathie (15 August 1919 – 3 January 1954) was a Scottish footballer who played as a centre forward.

Mathie played for Motherwell (two spells), Clyde, Partick Thistle, Llanelli, Kilmarnock and Workington.
