= Willie Martin (Scottish footballer) =

Scottish footballer

Personal information
- Full name: William Martin
- Place of birth: Scotland
- Position: Centre forward

Senior career*
Years	Team	Apps	(Gls)
1933–1938	Queen's Park	138	(52)
1938–1946	Clyde	33	(20)

International career
1935–1937	Scotland Amateurs	7	(4)
1938	Scottish League XI	2	(2)
- * Club domestic league appearances and goals

William Martin was a Scottish professional footballer who made over 170 appearances in the Scottish League for as a centre forward for Queen's Park and Clyde. In representative football, he was capped by Scotland Amateurs and the Scottish League XI.

== Personal life ==
Martin attended Queen's Park Secondary School.

== Career statistics ==
Appearances and goals by club, season and competition
Club	Season	League			National Cup		Other		Total	
Club	Season	Division	Apps	Goals	Apps	Goals	Apps	Goals	Apps	Goals
Queen's Park	1933–34	Scottish Division One	9	3	2	0	2 (Note: 1 appearance in Glasgow Cup, 1 appearance and 1 goal in Glasgow Merchants Charity Cup)	1	13	4
Queen's Park	1934–35	Scottish Division One	29	6	2	2	3 (Note: 2 appearances in Glasgow Merchants Charity Cup, 1 appearance in Glasgow Cup)	0	34	8
Queen's Park	1935–36	Scottish Division One	31	9	1	0	1 (Note: Appearance in Glasgow Cup)	0	32	9
Queen's Park	1936–37	Scottish Division One	32	4	0	0	1	0	33	4
Queen's Park	1937–38	Scottish Division One	37	30	3	1	3 (Note: 2 appearances and 1 goal in Glasgow Cup, 1 appearance and 1 goal in Glasgow Merchants Charity Cup)	2	43	33
Queen's Park	Total		138	52	8	3	10	3	156	58
Clyde	1938–39	Scottish Division One	33	20	7	7	5 (Note: 2 appearances and 2 goals in Glasgow Cup, 2 appearances in Glasgow Merchants Charity Cup, 1 appearance in Paisley Charity Cup)	2	45	29
Career total			171	72	15	10	15	5	201	87

== Honours ==
Clyde

- Scottish Cup: 1938–39
- Paisley Charity Cup: 1939, 1940

Scotland Amateurs

- British Amateur Championship: 1935–36, 1936–37
