= 1946–47 Scottish Division B =

Scottish Division B
- Season: 1946–47
- Champions: Dundee
- Promoted: Dundee; Airdrieonians

The 1946–47 Scottish Division B was won by Dundee who, along with second placed Airdrieonians, were promoted to Division A. Cowdenbeath finished bottom. It was the first season after World War II.

== Events ==
Dundee (who had also won the previous season's equivalent division but were not promoted as it was still considered an unofficial wartime competition) recorded 10–0 victories in consecutive matches: against Alloa Athletic on 8 March, and Dunfermline Athletic on 22 March.

== Table ==
Pos	Team	Pld	W	D	L	GF	GA	GD	Pts	Promotion or relegation
1	Dundee	26	21	3	2	113	30	+83	45	Promotion to the 1947–48 Division A
2	Airdrieonians	26	19	4	3	78	38	+40	42	Promotion to the 1947–48 Division A
3	East Fife	26	12	7	7	58	39	+19	31	
4	Albion Rovers	26	10	7	9	50	54	−4	27	
5	Alloa Athletic	26	11	5	10	51	57	−6	27	
6	Raith Rovers	26	10	6	10	45	52	−7	26	
7	Stenhousemuir	26	8	7	11	43	53	−10	23	
8	Dunfermline Athletic	26	10	3	13	50	72	−22	23	
9	St Johnstone	26	9	4	13	45	47	−2	22	
10	Dundee United	26	9	4	13	53	60	−7	22	
11	Ayr United	26	9	2	15	56	73	−17	20	
12	Arbroath	26	7	6	13	42	63	−21	20	
13	Dumbarton	26	7	4	15	41	54	−13	18	
14	Cowdenbeath	26	6	6	14	44	77	−33	18	
