= List of football clubs in Scotland =

This is a list of football clubs in Scotland.

== Club extremities ==
Northern-most SPFL club :- Elgin City, Borough Briggs (League Two)

Northern-most pyramid club :- Orkney, Kirkwall Grammar School (North Caledonian League)

Eastern-most SPFL club :- Peterhead, Balmoor Stadium (League One)

Eastern-most pyramid club :- Buchanhaven Hearts, Raemoss Park (North of Scotland Premier Division)

Western-most SPFL club :- Stranraer, Stair Park (League Two)

Western-most pyramid club :- Campbeltown Pupils, Kintyre Park (West of Scotland Division Four)

Southern-most SPFL club :- Stranraer, Stair Park (League Two)

Southern-most pyramid club :- St Cuthbert Wanderers, St Mary's Park (South of Scotland Football League)

Most isolated SPFL club :- Stranraer, Stair Park (League Two), 41 miles to Ayr United, Somerset Park (Championship)

Most isolated pyramid club :- Fort William, Claggan Park (North Caledonian League), 56 miles to Clachnacuddin, Grant Street Park (Highland League)

== Clubs in membership of the Scottish Professional Football League ==
=== Scottish Premiership ===
- Aberdeen
- Celtic
- Dundee
- Dundee United
- Falkirk
- Heart of Midlothian
- Hibernian
- Kilmarnock
- Motherwell
- Rangers
- St Johnstone
- St Mirren

=== Scottish Championship ===
- Arbroath
- Ayr United
- Dunfermline Athletic
- Greenock Morton
- Inverness Caledonian Thistle
- Livingston
- Partick Thistle
- Queen's Park
- Raith Rovers
- Stenhousemuir

=== Scottish League One ===
- Airdrieonians
- Alloa Athletic
- Cove Rangers
- East Fife
- East Kilbride
- Hamilton Academical
- Montrose
- Peterhead
- Queen of the South
- Ross County

=== Scottish League Two ===
- Annan Athletic
- Clyde
- Dumbarton
- Edinburgh City
- Elgin City
- Forfar Athletic
- Kelty Hearts
- Stirling Albion
- Stranraer
- The Spartans

== Clubs in membership of the Highland Football League ==
- Banks O' Dee
- Brora Rangers
- Buckie Thistle
- Clachnacuddin
- Deveronvale
- Formartine United
- Forres Mechanics
- Fraserburgh
- Huntly
- Invergordon
- Inverurie Loco Works
- Keith
- Lossiemouth
- Nairn County
- Rothes
- Strathspey Thistle
- Turriff United
- Wick Academy

== Clubs in membership of the Lowland Football League ==
=== Lowland League East ===
- Berwick Rangers (located in England)
- Bo'ness United
- Bonnyrigg Rose
- Brechin City
- Broxburn Athletic
- Civil Service Strollers
- Cowdenbeath
- Dunipace
- East Stirlingshire
- Gala Fairydean Rovers
- Hill of Beath Hawthorn
- Linlithgow Rose
- Lochee United
- Musselburgh Athletic
- Tranent
- University of Stirling

=== Lowland League West ===
- Albion Rovers
- Auchinleck Talbot
- Beith Juniors
- Caledonian Braves
- Celtic 'B'
- Clydebank
- Cumbernauld Colts
- Cumnock Juniors
- Dalbeattie Star
- Gretna 2008
- Johnstone Burgh
- Kilwinning Rangers
- Largs Thistle
- Newton Stewart
- Pollok
- Renfrew
  - Troon Juniors

== Clubs in membership of the East of Scotland Football League ==
=== Premier Division ===
- Broxburn Athletic
- Crossgates Primrose
- Dunbar United
- Dundonald Bluebell
- Glenrothes
- Haddington Athletic
- Hill of Beath Hawthorn
- Inverkeithing Hillfield Swifts
- Jeanfield Swifts
- Kinnoull
- Lothian Thistle Hutchison Vale
- Luncarty
- Musselburgh Athletic
- Penicuik Athletic
- Sauchie Juniors
- Tynecastle

=== First Division ===
- Arniston Rangers
- Blackburn United
- Camelon Juniors
- Dunipace
- Heriot-Watt University
- Kirkcaldy & Dysart
- Leith Athletic
- Lochore Welfare
- Newtongrange Star
- Oakley United
- Preston Athletic
- Rosyth
- St Andrews United
- Vale of Leithen
- Whitburn
- Whitehill Welfare

=== Second Division ===
- Armadale Thistle
- Bo'ness Athletic
- Burntisland Shipyard
- Coldstream
- Dalkeith Thistle
- Easthouses Lily Miners Welfare
- Edinburgh College
- Edinburgh South
- Edinburgh United
- Kennoway Star Hearts
- Newburgh
- Ormiston Primrose
- Peebles Rovers
- Stirling University reserves
- Thornton Hibs
- Tweedmouth Rangers (located in England)

=== Third Division ===
- Bathgate Thistle
- Edinburgh Community
- Fauldhouse United
- Harthill Royal
- Hawick Royal Albert
- Linton Hotspur
- Livingston United
- Lochgelly Albert
- Pumpherston
- Stoneyburn
- West Calder United

== Clubs in membership of the South of Scotland Football League ==
- Abbey Vale
- Creetown
- Dalbeattie Star
- Lochar Thistle
- Lochmaben
- Mid-Annandale
- Newton Stewart
- Nithsdale Wanderers
- St Cuthbert Wanderers
- Stranraer Reserves
- Upper Annandale
- Wigtown & Bladnoch

== Clubs in membership of the West of Scotland Football League ==
=== Premier Division ===
- Arthurlie
- Auchinleck Talbot
- Beith Juniors
- Benburb
- Clydebank
- Cumnock Juniors
- Darvel
- Gartcairn
- Glenafton Athletic
- Hurlford United
- Irvine Meadow XI
- Kirkintilloch Rob Roy
- Largs Thistle
- Pollok
- St Cadoc's
- Troon

==== First Division ====
- Ashfield
- Blantyre Victoria
- Cambuslang Rangers
- Drumchapel United
- Johnstone Burgh
- Kilbirnie Ladeside
- Kilwinning Rangers
- Maybole Juniors
- Neilston
- Petershill
- Renfrew
- Rutherglen Glencairn
- Shotts Bon Accord
- St Roch's
- Thorniewood United
- Whitletts Victoria

==== Second Division ====
- Ardrossan Winton Rovers
- Bonnyton Thistle
- Caledonian Locomotives
- Craigmark Burntonians
- Cumbernauld United
- Forth Wanderers
- Glasgow Perthshire
- Glasgow University
- Kilsyth Rangers
- Larkhall Thistle
- Maryhill
- Muirkirk Juniors
- St Anthony's
- Vale of Clyde
- Wishaw
- Yoker Athletic

==== Third Division ====
- Ardeer Thistle
- Bellshill Athletic
- Dalry Thistle
- Finnart
- Girvan
- Glasgow United
- Greenock Juniors
- Irvine Victoria
- Kello Rovers
- Kilsyth Athletic
- Lanark United
- Lesmahagow Juniors
- Port Glasgow
- Threave Rovers
- Vale of Leven
- West Park United

==== Fourth Division ====
- BSC Glasgow
- Campbeltown Pupils
- Carluke Rovers
- Easterhouse
- East Kilbride Thistle
- Eglinton
- Giffnock
- Glenvale
- Knightswood
- Lugar Boswell Thistle
- Newmains United
- Rossvale
- Royal Albert
- Saltcoats Victoria
- St. Peter's
- Thorn Athletic

== Clubs in membership of the North Caledonian Football League ==
- Alness United
- Bonar Bridge
- Bunillidh Thistle
- Clachnacuddin Reserves
- Dingwall
- Fort William
- Golspie Sutherland
- Halkirk United
- Inverness Athletic
- Inverness Thistle
- Orkney
- St Duthus
- Thurso

== Clubs in membership of the Scottish Junior Football Association ==
=== East Region ===
==== Midlands League ====
- Arbroath Victoria
- Blairgowrie
- Brechin Victoria
- Broughty Athletic
- Carnoustie Panmure
- Coupar Angus
- Downfield
- Dundee North End
- Dundee Violet
- Dundee St. James
- East Craigie
- Forfar United
- Forfar West End
- Letham
- Kirriemuir Thistle
- Lochee Harp
- Lochee United
- Montrose Roselea
- Scone Thistle
- Tayport

=== North Region ===
==== Premier Division ====
- Aberdeen East End
- Banks o' Dee reserves
- Bridge of Don Thistle
- Buchanhaven Hearts
- Colony Park
- Culter
- Dyce
- Ellon United
- Hermes
- Islavale
- Longside
- Lossiemouth United
- Maud
- Rothie Rovers
- Stonehaven
- Sunnybank

==== North Championship ====
- Banchory St Ternan
- Burghead Thistle
- Cruden Bay
- Deveronside
- Dufftown
- Forres Thistle
- Fraserburgh United
- Glentanar
- Hall Russell United
- Nairn St Ninian
- New Elgin
- Newmachar United
- Stoneywood Parkvale
- Westdyke
- Whitehills

== Miscellaneous clubs at amateur level ==
- Colville Park (Central Scottish Amateur Football League)
- Drumchapel Amateur (Caledonian Amateur Football League)
- Dukla Pumpherston (charity and exhibition matches)
- East Kilbride YM (Caledonian Amateur Football League)
- Eyemouth United (Border Amateur Football League)
- Glasgow Harp (Caledonian Amateur Football League)
- Harestanes (Central Scottish Amateur Football League)
- Links United (Caledonian Amateur Football League)
- Muir of Ord Rovers (Inverness and District Football League)
- Oban Saints (Scottish Amateur Football League)
- Rothesay Brandane (Caledonian Amateur Football League)
- Steins Thistle (Central Scottish Amateur Football League)
- Tain Thistle (Ross-shire Welfare Football League)
- United Glasgow

== Defunct clubs ==
=== Former Scottish Football League members ===
- Abercorn
- Airdrieonians (1894–2002)
- Armadale
- Ayr
- Ayr Parkhouse
- Bathgate
- Bo'ness
- Broxburn United
- Cambuslang
- Clackmannan
- Clydebank (1914–1932)
- Clydebank (1965–2002; became Airdrie United)
- Cowlairs
- Dumbarton Harp
- Dundee Wanderers
- Dykehead
- Edinburgh City (1931–1949)
- Galston
- Gretna
- Helensburgh
- Johnstone
- King's Park
- Linthouse
- Lochgelly United
- Meadowbank Thistle (became Livingston)
- Mid-Annandale
- Northern
- Port Glasgow Athletic
- Renton
- Solway Star
- St Bernard's
- Third Lanark
- Thistle

=== Selected other senior clubs (including North Caledonian League) ===
- 23rd Renfrew RV
- Alexandra Athletic
- Blythswood
- Caledonian
- Callander
- Clydesdale
- Dennistoun
- Dumbreck
- Dumfries YMCA
- Eastern
- Edinburgh Athletic (became Leith Athletic)
- Glasgow Hibernian
- Granville
- Inverness City
- Inverness Citadel
- Inverness Thistle
- Loch Ness
- Mossend Swifts
- Partick
- Rovers
- Scourie
- Selkirk
- Southern
- Stranraer Athletic
- Tarff Rovers
- Tollcross United
- Western
- Whithorn

=== Selected junior clubs ===
- Baillieston Juniors
- Ballingry Rovers
- Bankfoot Athletic
- Bishopmill United
- Blantyre Celtic
- Bridgeton Waverley
- Cambuslang Hibernian
- Clydebank Juniors (1899–1964)
- Cronberry Eglinton
- Duntocher Hibernian
- Fochabers
- Glenbuck Cherrypickers
- Lewis United
- Maryhill Hibernians
- Parkhead
- Port Glasgow Athletic Juniors
- Portgordon Victoria
- RAF Lossiemouth
- Shawfield
- Steelend Victoria
- Stonehouse Violet
- Strathclyde

== University clubs ==
Most universities in Scotland have football sides, as do some colleges, some compete in the BUSA Football League.

- Aberdeen University
- Edinburgh University
- Glasgow University
- Heriot-Watt University
- St Andrews University
- University of Stirling

== See also ==
- List of minor Scottish Cup entrants (1873–1894)
