= 2009–10 Hamilton Academical F.C. season =

Hamilton Academical
2009–10 season
- Chairman: Ronnie MacDonald
- Manager: Billy Reid
- Stadium: New Douglas Park
- Scottish Premier League: 7th
- Scottish Cup: Fourth round
- League Cup: Second round
- Top goalscorer: Simon Mensing (8 goals)
- Highest home attendance: 5,343 vs. Rangers Scottish Premier League 16 January 2010
- Lowest home attendance: 2,003 vs. Hearts Scottish Premier League 6 December 2009

The 2009–10 season was the 123rd season of competitive football by Hamilton Academical and the second season back in the top-flight of Scottish football. Hamilton Academical competed in the Scottish Premier League, Scottish Cup and Scottish League Cup.

== Transfers ==
=== Summer Transfer Window (1 July – 1 September 2009) ===
For a list of Scottish football transfers in 2009–10, see transfers in season 2009-10

In Permanent

| Date | Player | From | Fee | Contract length |
|---|---|---|---|---|
| 20 July 2009 | (Trinidad and Tobago) Marvin Andrews | (Scotland) Raith Rovers | Free | One year |
| 20 July 2009 | (Czech Republic) Tomáš Černý | (Czech Republic) Sigma Olomouc | £180,000 | Two years |
| 27 July 2009 | (England) Izzy Iriekpen | (England) Bristol City | Free | Two years |
| 5 August 2009 | (Republic of the Congo) David Louhoungou | (France) Stade Rennais | Free | Unknown |
| 6 August 2009 | (Portugal) Marco Paixão | (Spain) Cultural | Free | Unknown |
| 6 August 2009 | (Portugal) Flávio Paixão | (Spain) Benidorm | Free | Unknown |
| 14 August 2009 | (England) John Paul Kissock | (England) Everton | Free | Unknown |
| 14 August 2009 | (Spain) Luis Rubiales | (Spain) Alicante | Free | Unknown |
| 14 August 2009 | (Scotland) Kevin Welsh | (Scotland) Harestanes | Free | Unknown |
| 18 August 2009 | (England) Kyle Wilkie | (England) Stockport County | Free | Unknown |
| 21 August 2009 | (England) Leon Knight | (Greece) Thraysvoulos | Free | Unknown |
| 28 August 2009 | (Scotland) Gary Mason | (Scotland) St Mirren | Free | Six months |
| 1 September 2009 | (Canada) Richard Hastings | (Scotland) Inverness Caledonian Thistle | Free | One year |
| 29 September 2009 | (France) Guillaume Beuzelin | (England) Coventry City | Free | Unknown |

Loans in

| Date | Player | From | Loan Length |
|---|---|---|---|
| 4 August 2009 | (Australia) James Wesolowski | (England) Leicester City | Five months |
| 1 September 2009 | (Guadeloupe) Mickaël Antoine-Curier | (Scotland) Dundee | Six months |

Loans out

| Date | Player | To | Loan Length |
|---|---|---|---|
| 11 September 2009 | (Scotland) Kevin Welsh | (Scotland) Alloa Athletic | Four months |

Out Permanent

| Date | Player | To | Fee | Note |
|---|---|---|---|---|
| 29 May 2009 | (Scotland) Rocco Quinn | (Scotland) Queen of the South | Free | |
| 5 June 2009 | (Scotland) Kenny Deuchar | (Scotland) St Johnstone | Free | |
| 16 June 2009 | (England) Chris Swailes | (England) Gateshead | Free | |
| 14 July 2009 | (Scotland) Brian Easton | (England) Burnley | £350,000 | |
| 20 July 2009 | (France) Joël Thomas | (England) Colchester United | £125,000 | |
| 20 July 2009 | (Republic of Ireland) James McCarthy | (England) Wigan Athletic | £1,200,000 | |
| 28 July 2009 | (Scotland) Mark Corcoran | (Scotland) Partick Thistle | Free | |
| 26 August 2009 | (England) Richard Offiong | (England) Carlisle United | £75,000 | |

=== Winter Transfer Window (1 January – 2 February 2010) ===
In Permanent

| Date | Player | From | Fee | Contract length |
|---|---|---|---|---|
| — | — | — | — | — |

Loans in

| Date | Player | From | Loan Length |
|---|---|---|---|
| 28 January 2010 | (France) Joël Thomas | (England) Colchester United | Six months |
| 29 January 2010 | (Scotland) Brian Easton | (England) Burnley | Six months |

Loans out

| Date | Player | To | Loan Length |
|---|---|---|---|
| — | — | — | — |

Out Permanent

| Date | Player | To | Fee | Note |
|---|---|---|---|---|
| 28 January 2010 | (Trinidad and Tobago) Marvin Andrews | Released | — | — |

== Results and fixtures ==
| Win | Draw | Loss |

=== Scottish Premier League ===
| Match Day | Date | Opponent | H/A | Score | Hamilton Academical Scorer(s) | League Position | Attendance | Report |
|---|---|---|---|---|---|---|---|---|
| 1 | 15 August 2009 | Kilmarnock | A | 0–3 | | 12 | 5,307 | Official Website |
| 2 | 22 August 2009 | Aberdeen | H | 0–3 | | 12 | 3,347 | Official Website |
| 3 | 29 August 2009 | Rangers | A | 1–4 | McLaughlin (86) | 12 | 47,633 | Official Website |
| 4 | 13 September 2009 | Hibernian | H | 2–0 | Mensing 8' (pen.), Curier (11) | 11 | 4,023 | Official Website |
| 5 | 19 September 2009 | Falkirk | H | 0–0 | | 10 | 2,640 | Official Website |
| 6 | 26 September 2009 | Hearts | A | 1–2 | M Paixão (61) | 10 | 13,025 | Official Website |
| 7 | 3 October 2009 | St Johnstone | H | 0–2 | | 11 | 2,199 | Official Website |
| 8 | 17 October 2009 | Dundee United | A | 1–1 | Curier (64) | 11 | 5,944 | Official Website |
| 9 | 25 October 2009 | Celtic | H | 1–2 | Curier (82) | 11 | 4,689 | Official Website |
| 10 | 31 October 2009 | St Mirren | A | 2–0 | M Paixão (2), Canning {40} | 11 | 4,022 | Official Website |
| 11 | 7 November 2009 | Motherwell | H | 2–2 | Mensing (60), M Paixão (81) | 11 | 3,583 | Official Website |
| 12 | 21 November 2009 | Falkirk | A | 0–2 | | 11 | 5,268 | Official Website |
| 13 | 28 November 2009 | St Johnstone | A | 1–1 | Antoine-Curier (24) | 10 | 3,426 | Official Website |
| 14 | 6 December 2009 | Hearts | H | 2–1 | McArthur (5), Mensing (24) | 10 | 2,003 | Official Website |
| 15 | 12 December 2009 | Aberdeen | A | 2–1 | Antoine-Curier (32), Wesolowski (80) | 7 | 9,499 | Official Website |
| 16 | 26 December 2009 | Celtic | A | 0–2 | | 9 | 36,827 | Official Website |
| 17 | 13 January 2010 | Dundee United | H | 0–1 | | 10 | 2,033 | Official Website |
| 18 | 16 January 2010 | Rangers | H | 0–1 | | 10 | 5,343 | Official Website |
| 19 | 23 January 2010 | Hibernian | A | 1–5 | Paixão (69) | 10 | 11,481 | Official Website |
| 20 | 26 January 2010 | Kilmarnock | H | 0–0 | | 10 | 2,018 | Official Website |
| 21 | 30 January 2010 | Celtic | H | 0–1 | | 10 | 4,922 | Official Website |
| 22 | 6 February 2010 | Motherwell | A | 0–1 | | 12 | 4,777 | Official Website |
| 23 | 10 February 2010 | Dundee United | A | 2–0 | F.Paixão (23), M.Paixão (45) | 11 | 5,598 | Official Website |
| 24 | 13 February 2010 | Motherwell | H | 0–0 | | 11 | 3,133 | Official Website |
| 25 | 21 February 2010 | Hearts | A | 0–2 | | 11 | 13,496 | Official Website |
| 26 | 27 February 2010 | St Mirren | A | 0–0 | | 11 | 3,628 | Official Website |
| 27 | 6 March 2010 | Aberdeen | A | 1–1 | F.Paixão (62) | 11 | 2,030 | Official Website |
| 28 | 13 March 2010 | St Mirren | H | 1–0 | F.Paixão (90) | 10 | 2,179 | Official Website |
| 29 | 20 March 2010 | Falkirk | H | 2–2 | Antoine-Curier (50), Mensing 58' (pen.) | 9 | 2,461 | Official Website |
| 30 | 24 March 2010 | Kilmarnock | A | 2–1 | Antoine-Curier (21), Mensing (26) | 9 | 4,068 | Official Website |
| 31 | 27 March 2010 | St Johnstone | H | 1–0 | Wesolowski (43) | 9 | 2,245 | Official Website |
| 32 | 3 April 2010 | Rangers | A | 0–1 | | 9 | 48,068 | Official Website |
| 33 | 10 April 2010 | Hibernian | H | 4–1 | Mensing 17' (pen.), 60' (pen.), Thomas 68', 80' | 8 | 2,520 | Official Website |
| 34 | 17 April 2010 | Kilmarnock | H | 3–0 | Imrie (72), F.Paixão (77), Thomas (87) | 8 | 2,628 | Official Website |
| 35 | 24 April 2010 | Falkirk | A | 1–0 | M.Paixão (19) | 8 | 5,118 | Official Website |
| 36 | 1 May 2010 | Aberdeen | A | 3–1 | F.Paixão (1), Wesolowski (49), Mensing 58' (pen.) | 8 | 7,009 | Official Website |
| 37 | 5 May 2010 | St Mirren | H | 0–0 | | 8 | 3,102 | Official Website |
| 38 | 8 May 2010 | St Johnstone | A | 3–2 | McLaughlin (8), Imrie (15), Wesolowski (84) | 7 | 3,188 | |

=== Scottish League Cup ===
| Round | Date | Opponent | H/A | Score | Hamilton Academical Scorer(s) | Attendance | Report |
|---|---|---|---|---|---|---|---|
| 2nd Round | 25 August 2009 | Ross County | A | 1–2 | Mensing (90+2) | — | — |

=== Scottish Cup ===
| Round | Date | Opponent | H/A | Score | Hamilton Academical Scorer(s) | Attendance | Report |
|---|---|---|---|---|---|---|---|
| 4th Round | 10 January 2010 | Rangers | H | 3–3 | Mensing 39' (pen.), M Paixão (45+1), Curier (45+3) | 3,942 | BBC Sport |
| 4th Round Replay | 19 January 2010 | Rangers | A | 0–2 (a.e.t.) | | 21,856 | BBC Sport |

== Competitions ==
=== Overall ===
| Competition | Started round | Current position / round | Final position / round | First match | Last match |
|---|---|---|---|---|---|
| Scottish Premier League | — | 7 | | 15 August 2009 | |
| League Cup | 2nd Round | — | 2nd Round | 25 August 2009 | 25 August 2009 |
| Scottish Cup | 4th Round | 4th Round | | 10 January 2010 | |

Source: Competitions

=== SPL ===
==== Classification ====
| Pos | Team | Pld | W | D | L | GF | GA | GD | Pts | Qualification or relegation |
|---|---|---|---|---|---|---|---|---|---|---|
| 5 | Motherwell | 38 | 13 | 14 | 11 | 52 | 54 | −2 | 53 | Qualification for the Europa League second qualifying round |
| 6 | Heart of Midlothian | 38 | 13 | 9 | 16 | 35 | 46 | −11 | 48 | |
| 7 | Hamilton Academical | 38 | 13 | 10 | 15 | 39 | 46 | −7 | 49 | |
| 8 | St Johnstone | 38 | 12 | 11 | 15 | 57 | 61 | −4 | 47 | |
| 9 | Aberdeen | 38 | 10 | 11 | 17 | 36 | 52 | −16 | 41 | |

Source: SPFL Archive
Rules for classification: 1) points; 2) goal difference; 3) number of goals scored.

==== Results summary ====
| Overall | | | | | | | | Home | | | | | | Away | | | | | |
| Pld | W | D | L | GF | GA | GD | Pts | W | D | L | GF | GA | GD | W | D | L | GF | GA | GD |
|---|---|---|---|---|---|---|---|---|---|---|---|---|---|---|---|---|---|---|---|
| 15 | 4 | 4 | 7 | 15 | 24 | −9 | 16 | 2 | 2 | 3 | 7 | 10 | −3 | 2 | 2 | 4 | 8 | 14 | −6 |

Source: BBC Sport

==== Results by round ====
| Round | 1 | 2 | 3 | 4 | 5 | 6 | 7 | 8 | 9 | 10 | 11 | 12 | 13 | 14 | 15 | 16 | 17 | 18 | 19 | 20 | 21 | 22 | 23 | 24 | 25 | 26 | 27 | 28 | 29 | 30 | 31 | 32 | 33 | 34 | 35 | 36 | 37 | 38 |
|---|---|---|---|---|---|---|---|---|---|---|---|---|---|---|---|---|---|---|---|---|---|---|---|---|---|---|---|---|---|---|---|---|---|---|---|---|---|---|
| Ground | A | H | A | H | H | A | H | A | H | A | H | A | A | H | A | H | | | | | | | | | | | | | | | | | | | | | | |
| Result | L | L | L | W | D | L | L | D | L | W | D | L | D | W | W | P | | | | | | | | | | | | | | | | | | | | | | |
| Position | 12 | 12 | 12 | 11 | 10 | 10 | 11 | 11 | 11 | 11 | 11 | 11 | 10 | 10 | 7 | 8 | | | | | | | | | | | | | | | | | | | | | | |

Source: BBC Sport
A = Away; H = Home; W = Win; D = Draw; L = Loss; P = Postponed

==== Results by opponent ====
| Team | Results | | | | Points |
| Team | 1 | 2 | 3 | 4 | Points |
|---|---|---|---|---|---|
| Aberdeen | 0-3 | 2-1 | | | 3 |
| Celtic | 1-2 | | | | 0 |
| Dundee United | 1-1 | P-P | | | 1 |
| Falkirk | 0-0 | 0-2 | | | 1 |
| Heart of Midlothian | 1-2 | 2-1 | | | 3 |
| Hibernian | 2-0 | | | | 3 |
| Kilmarnock | 0-3 | | | | 0 |
| Motherwell | 2-2 | | | | 1 |
| Rangers | 1-4 | | | | 0 |
| St Johnstone | 0-2 | 1-1 | | | 1 |
| St Mirren | 2-0 | | | | 3 |

Source: 2009–10 Scottish Premier League article
