= List of Scottish football transfers 2009–10 =

This is a list of Scottish football transfers for the 2009–10 season.

Only moves featuring at least one 2009–10 Scottish Premier League club or one 2009–10 Scottish First Division club are listed.

== May 2009 – December 2009 ==
Date	Name	Moving from	Moving to	Fee
14 May 2009	Richie Hart	Ross County	Dundee	Free
14 May 2009	Sean Higgins	Ross County	Dundee	Free
14 May 2009	Dave Mackay	Livingston	St Johnstone	£50,000 (2 players)
14 May 2009	Murray Davidson	Livingston	St Johnstone	£50,000 (2 players)
19 May 2009	Chris Erskine	Kilbirnie Ladeside	Partick Thistle	Undisclosed
29 May 2009	Ludovic Roy	Dundee	Queen of the South	Free
29 May 2009	Rocco Quinn	Hamilton Academical	Queen of the South	Free
1 June 2009	Paul di Giacomo	Airdrie United	Ross County	Undisclosed
2 June 2009	Gary Miller	Livingston	Ross County	Free
2 June 2009	Steve Banks	Heart of Midlothian	Dundee United	Free
3 June 2009	Iain Vigurs	Inverness Caledonian Thistle	Ross County	Free
3 June 2009	Garry Wood	Inverness Caledonian Thistle	Ross County	Free
3 June 2009	Bob Malcolm	Motherwell	Brisbane Roar	Free
4 June 2009	Neil MacFarlane	Queen of the South	Greenock Morton	Free
4 June 2009	Chris Higgins	Clyde	Dunfermline Athletic	Free
4 June 2009	Kevin James	St Johnstone	Ayr United	Free
4 June 2009	Scott Agnew	Ayr United	Alloa Athletic	Loan
4 June 2009	Lee Mair	Aberdeen	St Mirren	Free
5 June 2009	Kenny Deuchar	Hamilton Academical	St Johnstone	Free
5 June 2009	Steven Doris	St Johnstone	Arbroath	Free
5 June 2009	Andy Aitken	Queen of the South	Ayr United	Free
5 June 2009	Sean Fleming	Dundee United	Montrose	Free
5 June 2009	Gordon Pope	Dundee United	Montrose	Free
5 June 2009	Fraser Milligan	Dundee United	Montrose	Free
7 June 2009	Georgios Efrem	Rangers	Omonia Nicosia	Free
8 June 2009	Murray Henderson	Ayr United	Stranraer	Free
11 June 2009	Stuart Kettlewell	Clyde	Ross County	Free
11 June 2009	Bruno Aguiar	Heart of Midlothian	Omonia Nicosia	Free
11 June 2009	Lee Cox	Leicester City	Inverness Caledonian Thistle	Free
11 June 2009	Michael Finnis	Inverness Caledonian Thistle	Clachnacuddin	Free
12 June 2009	Jennison Myrie-Williams	Bristol City	Dundee United	Undisclosed
13 June 2009	Willie McLaren	Clyde	Queen of the South	Free
15 June 2009	Pat Clarke	Clyde	Dundee	Free
15 June 2009	David O'Brien	Dundee	Ayr United	Free
15 June 2009	Scott Wilson	Dunfermline Athletic	North Queensland Fury	Free
16 June 2009	Graeme Owens	Middlesbrough	Kilmarnock	Undisclosed
16 June 2009	Chris Swailes	Hamilton Academical	Gateshead	Free
16 June 2009	Darren Smith	Brechin City	Raith Rovers	Free
16 June 2009	Grégory Tadé	Clyde	Raith Rovers	Free
16 June 2009	Gareth Wardlaw	Raith Rovers	Cowdenbeath	Free
18 June 2009	David Lilley	Kilmarnock	Queen of the South	Free
19 June 2009	Allan Dempsie	Ayr United	Elgin City	Free
20 June 2009	Steve Hislop	Raith Rovers	Arbroath	Free
22 June 2009	Willie Gibson	Kilmarnock	Dunfermline Athletic	Nominal
22 June 2009	Chris Casement	Ipswich Town	Dundee	Free
23 June 2009	Billy Gibson	Clyde	Ayr United	Free
23 June 2009	Scott Severin	Aberdeen	Watford	Free
23 June 2009	Shunsuke Nakamura	Celtic	Espanyol	Free
24 June 2009	Michael Higdon	Falkirk	St Mirren	Free
24 June 2009	Leigh Griffiths	Livingston	Dundee	£125,000
24 June 2009	Mark McAusland	St Mirren	Queen of the South	Free
25 June 2009	Michael McGovern	Dundee United	Ross County	Free
25 June 2009	Craig Gunn	Ross County	Elgin City	Free
26 June 2009	Dean Holden	Falkirk	Shrewsbury Town	Free
27 June 2009	Scott Chaplain	Partick Thistle	Dumbarton	Free
29 June 2009	Paul Gallacher	Dunfermline Athletic	St Mirren	Undisclosed
29 June 2009	David Clarkson	Motherwell	Bristol City	£600,000
29 June 2009	Patrick Cregg	Falkirk	Hibernian	Free
29 June 2009	Brian Kerr	Inverness Caledonian Thistle	Dundee	Free
29 June 2009	David Hutton	Clyde	Queen of the South	Free
29 June 2009	Dean Furman	Rangers	Oldham Athletic	Free
30 June 2009	Steven Fletcher	Hibernian	Burnley	£3,000,000
30 June 2009	Sean Crighton	St Mirren	Montrose	Free
30 June 2009	Suso Santana	Tenerife	Heart of Midlothian	Free
1 July 2009	Stephen Dobbie	Queen of the South	Swansea City	Free
1 July 2009	Derek Holmes	St Johnstone	Queen of the South	Free
1 July 2009	Christos Karipidis	Heart of Midlothian	Omonia Nicosia	Free
1 July 2009	Łukasz Załuska	Dundee United	Celtic	Free
1 July 2009	Danny Cadamarteri	Huddersfield Town	Dundee United	Free
1 July 2009	Robbie Neilson	Heart of Midlothian	Leicester City	Free
1 July 2009	Ian Black	Inverness Caledonian Thistle	Heart of Midlothian	Free
1 July 2009	Brian McLean	Motherwell	Falkirk	Free
1 July 2009	Danny Galbraith	Manchester United	Hibernian	Undisclosed
1 July 2009	Steve Jennings	Tranmere Rovers	Motherwell	Free
2 July 2009	Kevin McBride	Falkirk	Hibernian	Free
2 July 2009	Gary Harkins	Partick Thistle	Dundee	£150,000
2 July 2009	Graeme Smith	Motherwell	Brighton & Hove Albion	Free
3 July 2009	Alan O'Brien	Hibernian	Swindon Town	Free
4 July 2009	Paul Quinn	Motherwell	Cardiff City	£300,000
4 July 2009	Bryan Hodge	Blackburn Rovers	Partick Thistle	Free
4 July 2009	Steven McDougall	Airdrie United	Dunfermline Athletic	Undisclosed
5 July 2009	Dawid Kucharski	Lech Poznań	Heart of Midlothian	Undisclosed
7 July 2009	Craig Samson	Unattached	Ayr United	Free
7 July 2009	Paul Hartley	Celtic	Bristol City	Free
9 July 2009	Jamie Stevenson	Greenock Morton	East Stirlingshire	Free
9 July 2009	Ismaël Bouzid	Ankaragücü	Heart of Midlothian	Undisclosed
9 July 2009	Marc-Antoine Fortuné	Nancy	Celtic	£3,800,000
9 July 2009	Rob Jones	Hibernian	Scunthorpe United	£350,000
9 July 2009	Jim Hamilton	St Mirren	Partick Thistle	Free
9 July 2009	Marc Twaddle	Partick Thistle	Falkirk	Undisclosed
9 July 2009	Ryan Flynn	Liverpool	Falkirk	Loan
9 July 2009	Alex MacDonald	Burnley	Falkirk	Loan
9 July 2009	Patrick Boyle	Dumbarton	Partick Thistle	Free
10 July 2009	Graeme Smith	Rangers	St Johnstone	Undisclosed
10 July 2009	Greg Fleming	Oldham Athletic	Dunfermline Athletic	Loan
10 July 2009	Scott M. Thomson	Dunfermline Athletic	East Fife	Free
11 July 2009	Lee Robinson	Rangers	Kilmarnock	Free
12 July 2009	Thomas McCready	Everton	Hibernian	Free
13 July 2009	Scott Cuthbert	Celtic	Swindon Town	Undisclosed
14 July 2009	Brian Easton	Hamilton Academical	Burnley	£350,000
15 July 2009	Andy Webster	Rangers	Dundee United	Loan
15 July 2009	Danny Grainger	Dundee United	St Johnstone	Undisclosed
15 July 2009	Chris Humphrey	Shrewsbury Town	Motherwell	Free
16 July 2009	David Mitchell	Ayr United	Stranraer	Loan
16 July 2009	David Witteveen	Red Bull Salzburg	Heart of Midlothian	Free
16 July 2009	Landry N'Guémo	Nancy	Celtic	Loan
17 July 2009	Grant Murray	Kilmarnock	Raith Rovers	Free
17 July 2009	Dougie Hill	Alloa Athletic	Raith Rovers	Free
17 July 2009	Barry Ferguson	Rangers	Birmingham City	£1,200,000
17 July 2009	Scott McBride	Dunfermline Athletic	Cowdenbeath	Loan
17 July 2009	Alistair Park	Hibernian	Clyde	Free
17 July 2009	Scott Gair	St Mirren	Clyde	Free
17 July 2009	Conn Boyle	Ayr United	Clyde	Free
17 July 2009	Ryan Strachan	Celtic	Peterhead	Free
18 July 2009	Oliver Russell	Hibernian	Berwick Rangers	Free
20 July 2009	Scott Anson	Kilmarnock	Annan Athletic	Free
20 July 2009	Joël Thomas	Hamilton Academical	Colchester United	£125,000
20 July 2009	Marvin Andrews	Raith Rovers	Hamilton Academical	Free
20 July 2009	Tomáš Černý	Sigma Olomouc	Hamilton Academical	£180,000
21 July 2009	James McCarthy	Hamilton Academical	Wigan Athletic	£1,200,000
21 July 2009	Jonathon Fisher	Heart of Midlothian	Clyde	Free
21 July 2009	Paul McLean	Falkirk	Brechin City	Free
22 July 2009	Danijel Marčeta	Partizan Belgrade	Falkirk	Loan
22 July 2009	Damián Casalinuovo	Platense	Dundee United	£163,000
22 July 2009	Kevin Cawley	Celtic	Ayr United	Free
22 July 2009	Stephen Hughes	Motherwell	Norwich City	Free
22 July 2009	Bryan Deasley	Dundee	Forfar Athletic	Loan
23 July 2009	Robert Eagle	Norwich City	Inverness Caledonian Thistle	Free
23 July 2009	Jonny Hayes	Leicester City	Inverness Caledonian Thistle	Free
23 July 2009	Daniel Stratford	D.C. United	Inverness Caledonian Thistle	Free
23 July 2009	Mark Staunton	Falkirk	East Fife	Free
24 July 2009	Calum Reidford	Dunfermline Athletic	Clyde	Free
24 July 2009	Jay Lang	Falkirk	Clyde	Free
24 July 2009	Matt Curtis	Ross County	Forfar Athletic	Free
24 July 2009	Neil McCabe	Livingston	Cowdenbeath	Free
24 July 2009	Daniel Fox	Coventry City	Celtic	Undisclosed
24 July 2009	John Ruddy	Everton	Motherwell	Loan
24 July 2009	Denis McLaughlin	Heart of Midlothian	Dumbarton	Loan
24 July 2009	Ryan Marshall	Celtic	Stranraer	Free
25 July 2009	Darren McGeough	Greenock Morton	Stranraer	Free
27 July 2009	Izzy Iriekpen	Bristol City	Hamilton Academical	Free
27 July 2009	Stuart Nelson	Norwich City	Aberdeen	Loan
27 July 2009	Bryn Halliwell	Queen of the South	Greenock Morton	Free
28 July 2009	Mark Corcoran	Hamilton Academical	Partick Thistle	Free
28 July 2009	Mark Burchill	Rotherham United	Kilmarnock	Free
29 July 2009	Filipe Morais	Inverness Caledonian Thistle	St Johnstone	Free
29 July 2009	Martyn Lancaster	Queen of the South	Ljungskile SK	Free
29 July 2009	Damon Gray	Hibernian	Berwick Rangers	Free
30 July 2009	Jamie Smith	Aberdeen	Colorado Rapids	Free
30 July 2009	Vítor Lima	Ethnikos Piraeus	Falkirk	Free
30 July 2009	Neil McGregor	Clyde	Dunfermline Athletic	Free
31 July 2009	Chris Innes	Livingston	St Mirren	Free
1 August 2009	John Bateman	Aberdeen	Peterhead	Loan
1 August 2009	Dani Sánchez	Real Murcia	Inverness Caledonian Thistle	Free
1 August 2009	Narius Bulvītis	Tranzīts	Inverness Caledonian Thistle	Free
3 August 2009	Chris Smith	Greenock Morton	Dumbarton	Free
3 August 2009	Chris Craig	Rangers	Dumbarton	Free
3 August 2009	Paul McInnes	Kilmarnock	Stranraer	Free
4 August 2009	Charlie Adam	Rangers	Blackpool	£500,000
4 August 2009	James Wesolowski	Leicester City	Hamilton Academical	Loan
5 August 2009	Nicky Weaver	Charlton Athletic	Dundee United	Free
5 August 2009	David Louhoungou	Stade Rennais	Hamilton Academical	Free
6 August 2009	Marco Paixão	Cultural	Hamilton Academical	Free
6 August 2009	Flávio Paixão	Benidorm	Hamilton Academical	Free
6 August 2009	Stephen McKenna	Airdrie United	Queen of the South	Free
7 August 2009	Graham Stack	Plymouth Argyle	Hibernian	Free
7 August 2009	David O'Brien	Ayr United	Stirling Albion	Free
8 August 2009	Josh Thompson	Stockport County	Celtic	Undisclosed
8 August 2009	Curtis Jones	Stockport County	Celtic	Undisclosed
8 August 2009	Michael Ordish	Stockport County	Celtic	Undisclosed
11 August 2009	Josh Wagenaar	Yeovil Town	Falkirk	Free
12 August 2009	Jerel Ifil	Swindon Town	Aberdeen	Free
13 August 2009	Tom Hateley	Reading	Motherwell	Free
14 August 2009	Cillian Sheridan	Celtic	Plymouth Argyle	Loan
14 August 2009	Alan Gow	Rangers	Plymouth Argyle	Undisclosed
14 August 2009	Andrius Velička	Rangers	Bristol City	Loan
14 August 2009	John Paul Kissock	Everton	Hamilton Academical	Free
14 August 2009	Luis Rubiales	Alicante	Hamilton Academical	Free
14 August 2009	Kevin Welsh	Harestanes	Hamilton Academical	Free
15 August 2009	Greig Spence	Alloa Athletic	Celtic	Undisclosed
18 August 2009	Kyle Wilkie	Stockport County	Hamilton Academical	Free
21 August 2009	Anthony Stokes	Sunderland	Hibernian	Undisclosed
21 August 2009	Leon Knight	Thraysvoulos	Hamilton Academical	Free
22 August 2009	Davide Grassi	Espanyol	Aberdeen	Free
25 August 2009	Simon Lynch	Airdrie United	East Stirlingshire	Free
25 August 2009	Ross Harvey	Rangers	Dumbarton	Free
26 August 2009	Richard Offiong	Hamilton Academical	Carlisle United	£75,000
26 August 2009	Lukas Jutkiewicz	Everton	Motherwell	Loan
27 August 2009	Damián Casalinuovo	Dundee United	Raith Rovers	Loan
27 August 2009	Simon Ferry	Celtic	Swindon Town	Loan
27 August 2009	Ben Hutchinson	Celtic	Swindon Town	Loan
28 August 2009	Gary Mason	St Mirren	Hamilton Academical	Free
28 August 2009	Ross Perry	Rangers	Oxford United	Loan
28 August 2009	Steven Kinniburgh	Rangers	Oxford United	Loan
28 August 2009	Jonathan Brown	Heart of Midlothian	Livingston	Loan
28 August 2009	Stephen Husband	Heart of Midlothian	Livingston	Loan
28 August 2009	Marius Činikas	Kaunas	Heart of Midlothian	Loan
28 August 2009	Kjartan Finnbogason	Sandefjord	Falkirk	Loan
30 August 2009	Denis McLaughlin	Heart of Midlothian	Dumbarton	Free
30 August 2009	Massimo Donati	Celtic	Bari	£1,500,000
31 August 2009	Maroš Klimpl	FC Midtjylland	Dundee	Free
1 September 2009	Darren O'Dea	Celtic	Reading	Loan
1 September 2009	Yassin Moutaouakil	Charlton Athletic	Motherwell	Loan
1 September 2009	Jérôme Rothen	Paris Saint-Germain	Rangers	Loan
1 September 2009	Mickaël Antoine-Curier	Dundee	Hamilton Academical	Loan
1 September 2009	Richard Hastings	Inverness Caledonian Thistle	Hamilton Academical	Free
1 September 2009	Mark Brown	Celtic	Kilmarnock	Loan
2 September 2009	Stuart Golabek	Ross County	Inverness Caledonian Thistle	Free
3 September 2009	Jan Vennegoor of Hesselink	Celtic	Hull City	Free
7 September 2009	Ryan Scanlon	Ross County	Motherwell	Undisclosed
7 September 2009	William McLachlan	Rangers	Clyde	Free
11 September 2009	Iain Russell	Greenock Morton	Alloa Athletic	Loan
11 September 2009	Andrew McNeil	Hibernian	Montrose	Free
11 September 2009	Kevin Welsh	Hamilton Academical	Alloa Athletic	Loan
11 September 2009	Liam Miller	Queens Park Rangers	Hibernian	Free
11 September 2009	Simon Storey	Partick Thistle	Airdrie United	Free
15 September 2009	Nicky Clark	Aberdeen	Peterhead	Loan
15 September 2009	Ryan McCann	Queen of the South	Airdrie United	Free
16 September 2009	Ryan Flynn	Liverpool	Falkirk	Free
18 September 2009	Dermot McCaffrey	Falkirk	Arbroath	Loan
18 September 2009	Adam Strachan	Ross County	Dumbarton	Free
22 September 2009	Allan Johnston	Kilmarnock	St Mirren	Free
25 September 2009	Zheng Zhi	Unattached	Celtic	Free
25 September 2009	Mark Fotheringham	Unattached	Dundee United	Free
25 September 2009	Johnny Russell	Dundee United	Raith Rovers	Loan
25 September 2009	Dennis Wyness	St Mirren	Queen of the South	Loan
29 September 2009	Guillaume Beuzelin	Unattached	Hamilton Academical	Free
7 October 2009	Paul Quinn	St Mirren	Queen's Park	Loan
14 October 2009	Ryan McGowan	Heart of Midlothian	Ayr United	Loan
23 October 2009	Marco Andreoni	Dundee United	Forfar Athletic	Loan
23 October 2009	Conor Grant	Dundee United	Forfar Athletic	Loan
30 October 2009	Steve Lovell	Falkirk	Partick Thistle	Free
30 October 2009	Paul Sludden	Falkirk	East Fife	Loan
3 November 2009	Jamie Adams	Kilmarnock	Partick Thistle	Loan
4 November 2009	Pedro Moutinho	Marítimo	Falkirk	Free
6 November 2009	Lee Graham	Dunfermline Athletic	Clyde	Loan
7 November 2009	Mark Ridgers	Heart of Midlothian	East Fife	Loan
10 November 2009	David van Zanten	Hibernian	Greenock Morton	Free
12 November 2009	Pelé	West Bromwich Albion	Falkirk	Free
13 November 2009	Jordan White	Dunfermline Athletic	Clyde	Loan
13 November 2009	Romeo Filipovic	Unattached	Ayr United	Free
13 November 2009	Junior Mendes	Ilkeston Town	Ayr United	Loan
13 November 2009	Stephen Reynolds	St Johnstone	Ayr United	Loan
19 November 2009	Bryan Prunty	Ayr United	Stirling Albion	Loan
19 November 2009	David Gormley	Ayr United	Albion Rovers	Loan
19 November 2009	Bryn Halliwell	Greenock Morton	Forfar Athletic	Free
20 November 2009	Greg Cameron	Dundee United	Raith Rovers	Loan
20 November 2009	Mark Whatley	Raith Rovers	Tayport	Loan
24 November 2009	Javier Amaya	Almería B	Raith Rovers	Free
27 November 2009	Alan Reid	Unattached	Greenock Morton	Free
27 November 2009	Kevin Smith	Dundee United	Raith Rovers	Loan
1 December 2009	Chris Smith	St Mirren	Dunfermline Athletic	Loan
3 December 2009	Keith Watson	Dundee United	East Fife	Loan
3 December 2009	Ryan Harding	Greenock Morton	East Stirlingshire	Free
7 December 2009	Marvin Andrews	Hamilton Academical	Queen of the South	Loan
9 December 2009	Toufik Zerara	Al Dhafra Club	Falkirk	Free
11 December 2009	Kenny McLean	St Mirren	Arbroath	Loan
19 December 2009	Kyle Faulds	St Mirren	Arbroath	Loan

== January 2010 – May 2010 ==
Date	Name	Moving	Moving to	Fee
1 January 2010	Dušan Perniš	MŠK Žilina	Dundee United	Free
1 January 2010	Ki Sung-Yong	Seoul	Celtic	£2,100,000
1 January 2010	Jack Compton	Weston-super-Mare	Falkirk	Undisclosed
1 January 2010	William Kinniburgh	Partick Thistle	Clyde	Loan
2 January 2010	Graeme Smith	Brighton & Hove Albion	Hibernian	Free
2 January 2010	Paul Marshall	Manchester City	Aberdeen	Loan
3 January 2010	Stuart Elliott	Doncaster Rovers	Hamilton Academical	Free
8 January 2010	David van Zanten	Greenock Morton	Hamilton Academical	Free
9 January 2010	Greg Shields	Carolina RailHawks	Partick Thistle	Free
9 January 2010	Bryn Halliwell	Forfar Athletic	Partick Thistle	Free
11 January 2010	Jos Hooiveld	AIK	Celtic	£2,000,000
12 January 2010	Colin Healy	Ipswich Town	Falkirk	Loan
13 January 2010	Gary Caldwell	Celtic	Wigan Athletic	Undisclosed
13 January 2010	Michael Tidser	Ostersunds	Greenock Morton	Free
13 January 2010	Barry Robson	Celtic	Middlesbrough	Undisclosed
13 January 2010	Chris Killen	Celtic	Middlesbrough	Free
13 January 2010	Willo Flood	Celtic	Middlesbrough	Free
14 January 2010	Cillian Sheridan	Celtic	St Johnstone	Loan
14 January 2010	Enoch Showunmi	Leeds United	Falkirk	Free
14 January 2010	Ryan Conroy	Celtic	Partick Thistle	Loan
15 January 2010	Scott Agnew	Ayr United	Stranraer	Loan
15 January 2010	Alex Walker	Greenock Morton	Brechin City	Loan
15 January 2010	Stephen McGinn	St Mirren	Watford	Undisclosed
16 January 2010	Jonathan Crawford	Aberdeen	Peterhead	Loan
19 January 2010	Leon Knight	Hamilton Academical	Queen of the South	Free
19 January 2010	Chris Aitken	Ayr United	Stirling Albion	Free
19 January 2010	Bryan Prunty	Ayr United	Alloa Athletic	Free
19 January 2010	James Bloom	Falkirk	Alloa Athletic	Loan
20 January 2010	Thomas Rogne	Stabæk	Celtic	Undisclosed
22 January 2010	Chris Mitchell	Falkirk	Ayr United	Loan
22 January 2010	David Gormley	Ayr United	Alloa Athletic	Free
26 January 2010	Morten Rasmussen	Brøndby	Celtic	Undisclosed
26 January 2010	Brian Wake	Greenock Morton	Gateshead	Free
27 January 2010	Nicky Weaver	Dundee United	Burnley	Free
28 January 2010	Andrew Shinnie	Rangers	Dundee	Loan
28 January 2010	Joël Thomas	Colchester United	Hamilton Academical	Loan
28 January 2010	Tommy Wright	Aberdeen	Grimsby Town	Free
29 January 2010	Rory Loy	Rangers	St Mirren	Loan
29 January 2010	Stephen McManus	Celtic	Middlesbrough	Loan
29 January 2010	Danny Fox	Celtic	Burnley	Undisclosed
29 January 2010	Brian Easton	Burnley	Hamilton Academical	Loan
29 January 2010	Marvin Andrews	Hamilton Academical	Queen of the South	Free
29 January 2010	Steve Tosh	Queen of the South	Livingston	Loan swap deal
29 January 2010	Joe Hamill	Livingston	Queen of the South	Loan swap deal
29 January 2010	Gerry McLauchlan	Queen of the South	Arbroath	Loan
29 January 2010	Kevin Welsh	Hamilton Academical	Alloa Athletic	Free
29 January 2010	Scott Fox	Celtic	Queen of the South	Free
30 January 2010	Paul Emslie	Rangers	Peterhead	Loan
30 January 2010	Pedro Mendes	Rangers	Sporting Lisbon	Undisclosed
31 January 2010	Mark Brown	Celtic	Hibernian	Free
31 January 2010	Chris Casement	Dundee	Linfield	Loan
1 February 2010	Diomansy Kamara	Fulham	Celtic	Loan
1 February 2010	Edson Braafheid	Bayern Munich	Celtic	Loan
1 February 2010	Paul Slane	Motherwell	Celtic	Undisclosed
1 February 2010	Steven Lennon	Rangers	Lincoln City	Loan
1 February 2010	Martin Grehan	Stirling Albion	Partick Thistle	Nominal fee
1 February 2010	Scott McDonald	Celtic	Middlesbrough	£3,500,000
1 February 2010	Lee Miller	Aberdeen	Middlesbrough	£500,000
1 February 2010	Graham Carey	Celtic	St Mirren	Loan
1 February 2010	Kevin John Komor	TeBe Berlin	Hamilton Academical	Undisclosed
1 February 2010	Michael McGlinchey	Central Coast Mariners	Motherwell	Loan
1 February 2010	Rob Kiernan	Watford	Kilmarnock	Loan
1 February 2010	Scott Severin	Watford	Kilmarnock	Loan
1 February 2010	Chris Maguire	Aberdeen	Kilmarnock	Loan
1 February 2010	Mark Connolly	Bolton Wanderers	St Johnstone	Loan
1 February 2010	Stephen Husband	Heart of Midlothian	Blackpool	Nominal
1 February 2010	Ryan Stevenson	Ayr United	Heart of Midlothian	Undisclosed
1 February 2010	Rocky Visconte	Heart of Midlothian	Ayr United	Loan
1 February 2010	Tam McManus	Derry City	Ayr United	Free
1 February 2010	Robbie Keane	Tottenham Hotspur	Celtic	Loan
1 February 2010	Steve MacLean	Plymouth Argyle	Aberdeen	Loan
1 February 2010	Andrew McAskill	Inverness Caledonian Thistle	Clachnacuddin	Loan
1 February 2010	Jim Paterson	Plymouth Argyle	Aberdeen	Loan
1 February 2010	Dougie Imrie	Inverness Caledonian Thistle	Hamilton Academical	£25,000
1 February 2010	Alan Gow	Plymouth Argyle	Hibernian	Loan
1 February 2010	Richie Byrne	Inverness Caledonian Thistle	Darlington	Free
1 February 2010	Kevin McKinlay	Dundalk	Greenock Morton	Free
1 February 2010	Callum Booth	Hibernian	Arbroath	Loan
1 February 2010	David Louhoungou	Hamilton Academical	Kocaelispor	Free
1 February 2010	Ben Hutchinson	Celtic	Dundee	Loan
4 February 2010	Gary Mason	Hamilton Academical	Dunfermline Athletic	Free
5 February 2010	Michael Duberry	Wycombe Wanderers	St Johnstone	Free
5 February 2010	Kris Doolan	Partick Thistle	Clyde	Loan
11 February 2010	Darren Smith	Motherwell	Stenhousemuir	Loan
11 February 2010	Kurtis Byrne	Hibernian	Stirling Albion	Loan
12 February 2010	Mark McGeown	Queen of the South	Queen's Park	Free
12 February 2010	Dennis Wyness	St Mirren	Dumbarton	Free
12 February 2010	Ryan Martin	Motherwell	Queen's Park	Free
16 February 2010	Steve Bowey	Bedlington Terriers	Ayr United	Free
16 February 2010	Daniel McKay	Kilmarnock	Ayr United	Loan
17 February 2010	Grant Smith	North Queensland Fury	Ross County	Free
18 February 2010	Nicky Riley	Celtic	Hamilton Academical	Free
19 February 2010	Jackie McNamara	Falkirk	Partick Thistle	Loan
19 February 2010	Jonathan Page	Motherwell	Stirling Albion	Loan
19 February 2010	Ross Campbell	Ostersunds	Dunfermline Athletic	Free
27 February 2010	Donovan Simmonds	Floriana	Greenock Morton	Free
4 March 2010	Daniel Lafferty	Celtic	Ayr United	Loan
5 March 2010	Robert Malcolm	Brisbane Roar	Dundee	Free
12 March 2010	Kevin Cawley	Ayr United	Stranraer	Loan
16 March 2010	Tony Stevenson	Hamilton Academical	Alloa Athletic	Loan
26 March 2010	David Witteveen	Heart of Midlothian	Greenock Morton	Loan
26 March 2010	Iain Russell	Greenock Morton	Stirling Albion	Loan
26 March 2010	Ryan McWilliams	Greenock Morton	Largs Thistle	Loan
27 March 2010	Sean O'Connor	Unattached	Queen of the South	Free
30 March 2010	Jamie Mole	Heart of Midlothian	Raith Rovers	Loan
31 March 2010	Euan McLean	St Johnstone	Forfar Athletic	Loan
1 April 2010	Chris Smith	St Mirren	Dunfermline Athletic	Loan
1 April 2010	Anton Kurakins	Celtic	Brechin City	Loan
1 April 2010	Mitchel Megginson	Aberdeen	Arbroath	Loan
1 April 2010	Krisjanis Vallers	Celtic	Brechin City	Loan
12 April 2010	Kyle Letheren	Unattached	Motherwell	Free
