= John Duffy =

John Duffy may refer to:

== Sportspeople ==
- John Duffy (footballer, born 1886) (1886–?), English football centre half for Bradford City
- John Duffy (footballer, born 1922) (1922–1996), Scottish football right back for Clyde and Norwich
- John Duffy (footballer, born 1929) (1929–2004), Scottish football wing half for Celtic, Arbroath and Southend
- John Duffy (footballer, born 1943), Scottish football wing half for Raith, Dunfermline, Darlington and Australian clubs
- John Duffy (Gaelic footballer), Gaelic football player
- John Duffy (rugby league) (born 1980), rugby league player
- John Duffy (soccer) (1905–1984), American soccer player

== Others ==
- John Duffy (composer) (1926–2015), American composer
- John Duffy (economist) (born 1964), American economist
- John Duffy (mobster) (died 1924), American gang member, member of the North Side Gang
- John Duffy (writer), Canadian writer and political strategist
- John Duffy and David Mulcahy (both born 1959), the Railway Rapists, British rapists and murderers
- John A. Duffy (1884–1944), American bishop
- John F. Duffy (born 1963), legal academic
- John Gavan Duffy (1844–1917), Australian politician
- John J. Duffy, American Medal of Honor recipient
- John J. Duffy Jr. (1933–2019), American criminal defense attorney
- John Duffy (medical historian) (1915–1996), University professor & author of several books on U.S. medical history

== See also ==
- Jack Duffy (actor) (1882–1939), American film actor
- Jack Duffy (1926–2008), Canadian entertainer
