= Tollcross =

Tollcross may refer to the following places:

- Tollcross, Edinburgh, Scotland
  - Tollcross Primary School
  - Tollcross United F.C. a former football club
- Tollcross, Glasgow, Scotland
  - Tollcross railway station (closed)
  - Tollcross International Swimming Centre

== See also ==
- Toll (fee), a fee charged for the use of a road or waterway
