= St Andrews University F.C. =

Association football club in Scotland

St Andrews University
- Full name: St Andrews University Men's Football Club
- Nickname(s): The Saints
- Founded: 1887
- Ground: University Park; St Andrews; Fife
- Manager: Stuart Milne
- League: Fife Amateur League; Premier Division
Home colours	Away colours	Third colours

The University of St Andrews Football Club was formed in the late 19th century at the University of St Andrews in Scotland. The club currently has seven men's and three women's teams participating in the Kingdom of Fife AFA and the BUCS Leagues while also boasting two developmental teams.

== History ==
=== Senior/amateur Saturday football ===
The club fully affiliated to the Scottish Football Association (SFA) in 1907, playing senior football until it allowed its membership to lapse in 1939. Since then the university teams have been playing in the local Amateur league.

In the early 20th century the four 'Ancient' Universities (Aberdeen, Edinburgh, Glasgow and St. Andrews) were given a bye into the 3rd qualifying round of the Scottish Cup. St. Andrews debuted in 1907 against the Vale of Atholl in front of 1000 spectators at University Park.

The club have appeared in the Scottish Cup proper on three occasions losing 10–1 to Cowdenbeath in 1923, 3–;0 at home to Bathgate in 1929 and 6–1 away to Nithsdale Wanderers in 1930.

There are no records of the club's exploits in the Scottish Amateur Cup, but the university side have won the Fife Amateur Cup on three occasions –1934-35, 1957–58, and more recently in 2018-2019.

A second XI can be traced back to the 1923–24 season, but it is unknown exactly when the club first entered a second team into the Fife Amateur League. However, when they did so it was under the moniker 'United Colleges' in reference to the amalgamation of St Leonard's and St Salvator's Colleges' in 1747. The club have spent most of their time in Divisions 1 and 2. Their most successful season to date was 2003–04 where they were 'promoted' to division 1 via a restructuring of the league and they won the Division 2 Cup, defeating Inverkeithing Swifts in the final 2–1.

The club entered a third team into the Saturday Amateur League for the first time in 2005, under the banner of St. Andrews Academicals. After two disappointing seasons, the club decided to stop fielding Academicals in the Fife League.

The university currently play in the Fife Premier Division while the United Colleges have been disbanded.

=== Inter-university competition ===
The club competed against the four Ancients in 'Friendly' competition from their formation in 1887 until the introduction of the Queen's Park Shield (QPS) competition in 1921. The First XI have won the competition four times with the last being in the 2017-2018 season. The format of the QPS changed a number of times over the years, but settled finally in the late 1990s when BUCS took over the co-ordination of Scottish University Football from the now defunct SUSF. The Shield is now awarded to the winner of the Scottish 1A Conference, which for the last four years has been won by Heriot-Watt. St Andrews 1st XI have, since the late nineties, been in Scottish Conference 2A suffering many years of frustration and near misses in their quest for promotion.

This all changed in 2005 when the team won the Conference and promotion into the top division. On top of that the team qualified for the BUSA Trophy, a British University knock-out competition, for the first time. After defeating the University of Central Lancashire in the last 16 and University of York. St. John in the quarter-finals, the team were very unfortunate to lose to DeMontford University on penalties, in a game that was watched by over 150 at University Park.

The United Colleges (2nd XI) are also believed to have competed in friendlies up until the advent of the SUSF Paterson trophy in 1973–74. In 2002 the Colleges came close to winning the Trophy and entry to BUSA plate but were lost the league by 1 point to Stirling University. With the advent of integrated leagues (all 1st, 2nd and 3rd XI play in the same league and can be promoted/relegated to any division) in BUSA competitions in 2004, the Paterson Trophy disappeared. Since 2002 the team have suffered a couple of relegations and are fighting for promotion from Scottish 5a.

The Academicals (3rd XI) entered the Colts trophy at its inception in 1979–80. The team have never won the competition, but came close in 1999–2000 and 2000–01. The majority of players from these years went on to play for the first XI. In fact the team of 2000–01 defeated the United Colleges by 4–1 in a highly contested 'friendly' match. The team are currently holding their own in BUSA Scottish Conference 5b.

SUSF did organise an indoor five-a-side tournament and a Freshers' tournament. The inaugural tournament of the former was won by Edinburgh in 1975–76, but St. Andrews have won it three times since then in 1977–78, 1981–82 and 1985–86. The competition stopped running in the mid-1990s for reasons unknown.

The Freshers' Tournament was first contested in 1984–85 and has been dominated by Edinburgh University since its inception. Saints finally lifted the trophy in 1999–2000 winning every game in the regional competition in St Andrews and the finals in Edinburgh. Most of the 'Golden Generation' went on to pick up University Colours later in their Saints careers. With increased games in the BUSA leagues and each University putting more and more teams into the Amateur Leagues, the competition came to an end in 2003–04.

=== Kits ===
University Home kit (1910–38)
University Home kit (1998–99 and 2002–03)
University Home kit (2000 to 2002 and 2003 to 2006)

== Management ==
Since the club has an ever-changing roster of Office Bearers and limited resources, it has been difficult to attract coaches of a high quality on a regular basis. In the late 1980s, Andy Law, a barman from the Central Bar on Market Street, volunteered to coach the First XI, providing much needed objectivity from the sidelines.

In the mid-1990s, rector Donald Findlay helped to provide coaching on a sporadic basis from Rangers But with the Q.C's resignation as rector came the end of the tie-up. In between times, all three squads have relied on the team captains to take training and pick the team.

During the 1997–98 season, the then AU president and 1st XI left-back, Thomas Finbar Patrick William Doyle, drafted in Eric Walker to help first team captain Ross Gilder, whose form was suffering as a result of the dual strains of team selection and his ever increasing waistline. Walker's arrival, a former Scottish Amateur Cup winner (sporting discipline unknown), looked like it would herald a new era of total football within the club. However, the new managerial duo only ever really hit it off during happy hour which led to both departing (Gilder to The Kinnes Fry Bar and Walker to Bell's distillery) shortly after.

In 2002 the first team took the unprecedented step of 'employing' a coach to take training and attend matches, but with team selection remaining with the captain. Gary Cardle coached the team to varying success before 'losing the dressing room' in the 2003–04 season. He moved on to Cowdenbeath Youth team and Heriot-Watt 2nd XI respectively.

The reigns were immediately taken up voluntarily by Peter Henry, father of 1st team player Pete Henry Jr. His effect was immediate, with the players galvanised, the team finished mid-table in the Fife Amateur Premier League and second in the BUSA Scottish 2a Conference in his first season.

The 1st XI were to enjoy a period of success unrivaled in modern times under Henry, as in his second season the team marched to League victory in the BUSA Scottish 2a Conference and the semi-finals of the BUSA Trophy in 2006. Henry left the club in an huff after the 2006 committee election after his son did not win the captaincy. Happily, however, the university agreed a deal in July 2006 with Dundee United allowing the professional Club to train on the university grounds in return for professional coaching for all three University teams.

In January 2011 Stuart Milne was hired as director of football at the university, being given the responsibility to improve the results and stature of all the university sides. Since then the 1st XI have been promoted in both the BUCS League and Fife Amateur League, while a fourth XI has also been created.
