= Maryhill Harp F.C. =

Association football club in East Dunbartonshire, Scotland

Coordinates: 55.897756°N 4.296214°W

Maryhill Harp
- Full name: Maryhill Hibernians Football Club (1923–1939); Maryhill Harp Football Club (1939–1967)
- Nicknames: The Hibs, Harp
- Founded: 1923
- Dissolved: 1967
- Ground: Kelvinvale Park; Glasgow
- League: Scottish Junior League 1923–1941; Central Junior League 1941–1967

Maryhill Harp Football Club were a Scottish football club based in the Maryhill area of Glasgow, who played in Scottish Junior Football Association competitions from 1923 until they went out of business in 1967. Before 1939, the club were known as Maryhill Hibernians. They won the Scottish Junior Cup once, in 1928.

== History ==
Maryhill Hibernian were formed in 1923 and admitted to the Scottish Junior League (SJL), using Kelvinvale Park in Maryhill as their home ground. Their greatest season came in 1927–28 and coincided with the Intermediate dispute in the Junior game. With several more successful clubs such as Baillieston, Duntocher Hibs and Yoker Athletic defecting from the SJL to the Intermediates, plus no Intermediate representation in the Junior Cup, Hibernians won a league and cup double. Their 6–2 victory over Burnbank Athletic at Firhill remains the highest scoring Junior Cup final in the competition's history. Willie Gray, who scored four of the goals, was already Hibs first Scotland Junior internationalst, being capped against Ireland in March 1928. He and fellow scorer Joe Riley both joined Celtic the following season along with goalkeeper David Nicol.

Hibs added a second SJL championship title in 1932–33 but the dispersed nature of the league, with clubs from towns such as Dunoon and Rothesay, and the ebbing away of local opposition to other leagues, was becoming financially untenable. After a few struggling years, the club submitted their resignation to the league in May 1939 and declared their intention to apply for membership of the Central League. The SJL however, refused to accept the resignation and the incumbent Hibs committee chose to close the club down in early June 1939.

Immediately, a new club Maryhill Harp was founded by former Hibernians officials and by the end of June 1939, they had intimated their intention to apply for the Central League using Hibs' former Kelvinvale Park. At the Central League AGM however, the Harp application surprisingly failed at the first ballot and the club were obliged to re-apply to the SJL, who readmitted the club. Within months, the outbreak of World War II affected football activities dramatically. Wartime travel restrictions badly hampered the running of the SJL and by February 1940, the league announced it would close down. A small wartime league was constituted in March 1940 and this ran for a second year in 1940–41 before the SJL went into complete abeyance for the rest of the war.

The club were finally admitted to the Central League in 1941–42. Their first season was a relatively successful one, winning their league section only to lose to Clydebank in the championship play-off. Latterly, Harp enjoyed moderate success, although they reached the final of the West of Scotland Cup in 1954–55, losing in a replay to Douglas Water Thistle. The end for the club was signalled in January 1967 when Glasgow Corporation compulsorily purchased Kelvinvale Park for new housing. Harp played their final match on 7 June 1967 against Greenock Juniors losing 1–0. Although the area of the ground has been completely redeveloped, Kelvinvale was located around present day Kilmun Street / Ledgowan Place.

Hibs/Harp was generally run on a low cost basis and supplied players for wealthier Junior clubs and Senior teams. The club had a fruitful relationship with Celtic who loaned out many youth prospects and picked up the occasional player themselves. As well as the three aforementioned players from Hibernians' Junior Cup winning side, Celtic also signed Charlie Napier and Peter Scarff the following year with the latter winning one cap for the full Scotland team. In the Harp era, players exchanged between the two clubs included Hugh Long, Willie Miller, Duncan MacKay, Bertie Auld, Frank Haffey and Jimmy Quinn with all but Quinn becoming full Scotland internationalists.

== Honours ==
- Scottish Junior Cup winners: 1927–28
- Scottish Junior League winners: 1927–28, 1932–33

== Sources ==
- Scottish Football Historical Archive
