= Jack Duffy (disambiguation) =

Jack Duffy may refer to:

- Jack Duffy (1926-2008), Canadian comedian and actor
- Jack Duffy (actor) (1882-1939), American actor
- Jack Duffy (cricketer) (1911-1998), New Zealand cricketer
- Jack Duffy (ice hockey) (born 1970), American hockey player

== See Also ==
- John Duffy, multiple people
