= Colville Park A.F.C. =

Association football club in Scotland

Colville Park
- Full name: Colville Park E Amateur Football Club
- Founded: 1968
- Ground: Dalziel Park
- Coordinates: 55°47′55″N 3°56′42″W
- League: Central Scottish AFL Premier Division
- 2018–19: Central Scottish AFL Premier Division, 1st of 12
Home colours	Away colours

Colville Park E Amateur Football Club is a Scottish amateur football club based in Motherwell, North Lanarkshire. In 2016 they competed in the Scottish Cup for the first time after winning the previous season's Scottish Amateur Cup, and repeated this feat in 2017 and 2019. The team colours are white and blue.

== Club history ==
The football club was founded in 1968 as Colvilles AFC, a works team for Ravenscraig and other steelworking facilities owned by David Colville & Sons. They soon adjusted their membership to include players outwith the steel industry. The club badge still incorporates the logo of British Steel. Coville Park were initially part of the Lanarkshire Amateur Football Association, during which time they won the Scottish Amateur Cup in 1976. In 1990 they aligned to the Central Scottish Amateur Football League where they have remained since. In February 2017, disputes between the country club and the football team management led to a separation of the entities. The team relocated their social base to the Electric Bar in the Airbles area of Motherwell, subsequently adding 'E' to the club name in recognition of the support received from the establishment.

== Location ==
From their formation, Colville Park AFC were based at Colville Park Country Club, which is within the Jerviston former country estate on the northern edge of Motherwell. It was owned by the Colville family who operated the steelworks in the area and donated the lands to the people of the town. The country club featuring a golf course and bowling greens was established in 1923. A new club house with modern facilities was constructed in the 1960s. Following the 2017 split, matches are now played at Dalziel Park between the villages of Carfin and Cleland on the outskirts of the town.

== Recent performance ==
Colville Park were finalists in the Scottish Amateur Cup in 2012 2013 and 2014 before finally winning it in 2016 in the final at Hampden Park against Kingdom Caledonian League side Leven United from Fife, the goalscorers being Liam Cusack and David McKay. They have also been winners and runners-up in the West of Scotland Amateur Cup on several occasions.

In 2017, Colville Park retained the Scottish Amateur Cup after beating Southside AFC of Glasgow 1–0 in the Hampden final, thus qualifying for the Scottish Cup again in 2017–18. They also retained the Central Scottish AFL Premier title.

In 2018, the club were unsuccessful in the Scottish Cup but did win both the CSAFL title and the West of Scotland Amateur Cup. They retained the league title in 2019. In May 2019, Colville Park defeated fellow CSAFL team Eastfield AFC (from Cumbernauld) 2–0 to win the Scottish Amateur Cup for the third time in four seasons.

=== Scottish Cup ===
==== 2016–17 ====
The club's victory in the 2016 Scottish Amateur Cup permitted Colville Park to enter the 2016–17 Scottish Cup. In Preliminary round 1 they overcame Edusport Academy of the South of Scotland Football League after a replay; it was the first time that an Amateur League side had progressed in the national tournament (this being only the second year of being invited to compete). However, in preliminary round 2 they were defeated by Girvan – the same team who had beaten the previous year's Amateur entrants Harestanes.

Colville Park's 'home' matches were played at New Tinto Park in Glasgow, the newly built ground of Junior club Benburb, due to their own basic facilities in Motherwell being unsuitable for staging Scottish Cup fixtures.

==== 2017–18 ====
Winning the 2017 Scottish Amateur Cup again allowed Colville Park to enter the senior Scottish Cup in 2017–18. After defeating East of Scotland League sides Burntisland Shipyard (7–0) and Preston Athletic (5–0) in the preliminary rounds, they overcame Lowland League team Cumbernauld Colts by a 2–1 scoreline (again played at New Tinto Park in Glasgow). In Round 2, Coville Park lost 9–0 to Peterhead at Balmoor Stadium in their first ever meeting with an SPFL club.

==== 2019–20 ====
The club entered the senior Scottish Cup again in 2019–20 as winners of the 2019 Scottish Amateur Cup. However this time their run was very brief, with a 4–0 defeat (nominally at home but again played at New Tinto Park, Glasgow) to East of Scotland League side Whitehill Welfare in the First Preliminary round, failing to score despite the opposition using an outfield player in goals with their regular goalkeepers unavailable.
