= Peter Lamb =

Peter Lamb may refer to:

- Peter Lamb (politician) (born 1986), British politician
- Peter Lamb (footballer) (1925–1978), Scottish footballer
- Peter Lamb (tennis) (born 1959), South African tennis player
