= Willie Miller (footballer, born 1924) =

Scottish footballer

Personal information
- Full name: William Miller
- Date of birth: 20 October 1924
- Place of birth: Larkhall, Scotland
- Date of death: 23 May 2005 (aged 80)
- Position: Goalkeeper

Youth career
- Maryhill Harp

Senior career*
Years	Team	Apps	(Gls)
1942–1950	Celtic	94	(0)
1950–1953	Clyde	51	(0)
1954–1955	Hibernian	3	(0)
Total		148	(0)

International career
1946–1947	Scotland	6	(0)
1947–1948	Scottish League XI	7	(0)
- * Club domestic league appearances and goals

Willie Miller (20 October 1924 – 23 June 2005) was a Scottish footballer, who played as a goalkeeper for Celtic, Clyde and Hibernian. Miller was capped six times by the Scotland national football team.

Miller was signed by Celtic in May 1942, and made his debut in the following August, aged just 17. He remained at Celtic Park until 1950, but he won no medals. On the resumption of international football after the Second World War, Miller was first choice for Scotland. He also represented the Scottish League XI seven times between March 1947 and November 1948.

In 1950 he moved across the city to Clyde, and had two good seasons before being dropped from the team. Miller left Clyde in November 1953, and after a few months out of football, signed for Hibernian. He was used as reserve cover, however, and only made three league appearances before retiring from the game in 1955.
