= Crawford Baptie =

Scottish footballer

Personal information
- Date of birth: 24 February 1959 (age 67)
- Place of birth: Glasgow, Scotland
- Positions: Defender; forward

Youth career
- Baillieston Juniors

Senior career*
Years	Team	Apps	(Gls)
1984–1986	Falkirk	45	(6)
1986	Motherwell	33	(3)
1986–1993	Falkirk	178	(31)
1993–1997	Hamilton Academical	111	(3)
1997–1998	Clyde	30	(0)
1998–1999	Stenhousemuir	27	(1)
Total		424	(44)
- * Club domestic league appearances and goals

Crawford Baptie (born 24 February 1959) is a Scottish former footballer.

== Career ==
During his playing career, Baptie played junior football for Baillieston Juniors, before moving onto the professional game with Falkirk (where he won the Scottish First Division title), Motherwell, Hamilton Academical, Clyde and Stenhousemuir. He was infamously punched by Mick McCarthy during a match in 1988.

Despite joining professional football, Baptie chose to stay part-time by continuing working as a manager at Arnold Clark. After retiring as a player, he left his twenty-year career at Arnold Clark and became General Manager of Falkirk for a number of years.

== Honours ==
Scottish First Division: 1990–91

== Personal life ==
His son Jack is also a footballer.
