= Scottish Junior Football League =

The Scottish Junior Football League (SJL) was a Scottish football competition that, through various incarnations, existed from 1892 to 1947.

It was based in the west of Scotland and largely consisted of Junior clubs that were not considered good enough for the major leagues of the time i.e. the Glasgow Junior Football League (GJL), the Central Junior Football League and the Lanarkshire Junior Football League.

== History ==
The first SJL was formed in 1892 but, despite its title, was effectively a Glasgow district league. It was formed by ten clubs: five from the city and five from the neighbouring districts. Ashfield, Benburb, Parkhead and Vale of Clyde were among its founding members. While it was seen as reasonably successful by the district sides, the city sides did not share that view and all five left at the end of the season. The league continued for one more season but was wound up in 1894.

The second SJL was a continuation of the Glasgow and District Junior League. It lost three of its city members in 1900, and after replacing them decided to rename itself. Its main problems were its inability to attract any of the major sides – these clubs aspired to be in the GJL – and its high turnover in membership. In all the league lasted only four years.

The third, and main, SJL was formed by seven of the clubs who lost their places in the Glasgow Junior League "great betrayal" scandal of 1908. Twelve teams enlisted in its initial season including Bellshill Athletic, Blantyre Victoria and Pollok. Given little hope by its critics, this version prospered and lasted until 1946. It was initially confined to the Glasgow district, but soon extended to include sides from Bute, Clackmannanshire, Ayrshire and Stirlingshire. After a year, a Second Division was added with automatic promotion and relegation. Because of World War I, it operated with one division from 1915 until 1919, when the Second Division was reintroduced. The SJL's main problem was it remained in the shadow of the GJL, to which most of its members aspired. Over the years the SJL lost many of its stronger clubs including Shawfield and Shettleston in 1921. A protest to the Scottish Junior Football Association (SJA) was lost on a technicality, however the loss of St Anthony's and St Roch's a year later led to another protest to the SJA and a subsequent charge of poaching. The GJL refused to hand these two clubs back, resulting in another of the GJL's splits with the SJA. The resulting formation of a Second Division saw the SJL lose a further five clubs. After the dispute was over a year later, the SJL admitted some of the GJL's discarded teams.

In 1923 the SJL re-organised its divisions into East and West sections – the winners playing off for the title – but the Second Division was reintroduced after two years.

The Intermediate dispute of 1927 saw the defection of eight of its clubs to the new Scottish Intermediate Football League, and the subsequent recruitment of several clubs from the defunct Stirlingshire Junior Football League made it necessary to return to the East/West sections.

The wide geographical spread of its clubs made life difficult for the league after 1939. Two wartime editions were played in 1939–40 and 1940–41 but the league subsequently suspended its operations for the rest of World War II. An attempted revival in 1945 was put off for a year, but the Central Junior Football League's refusal to hand back co-opted teams from the war essentially killed the SJL off. It attempted one more season and disbanded.

During its lifetime, the league provided an avenue for many clubs to participate in the Junior game. The principal leagues of the time were more or less closed shops, and the SJL's members may never have played at this level had it not been around.

== Winners ==
- Scottish Junior League

Season	Champions
1892–93	Baillieston Thistle
1893–94	Baillieston Thistle
1894–1899	No competition
1899–1900	Cambuslang Rangers
1900–01	Baillieston Thistle
1901–02	Kisyth Emmett
1902–03	Airdriehill Shamrock
1903–04	Kilbirnie Ladeside
1904–1908	No competition
1908–09	Bellshill Athletic
1909–10	Port Glasgow Athletic Juniors; Division 2: Vale of Grange
1910–11	Port Glasgow Athletic Juniors; Division 2: Milngavie Allander
1911–12	Vale of Grange; Division 2: Croy Celtic
1912–13	Neilston Victoria; Division 2: Inkerman Rangers
1913–14	Port Glasgow Athletic Juniors; Division 2: Thornliebank
1914–15	Renfrew Juniors; Division 2: Airdriehill Shamrock
1915–16	Renfrew Juniors
1916–17	St. Anthony's
1917–18	Burnbank Athletic
1918–19	St. Anthony's
1919–20	St. Anthony's; Division 2: Duntocher Hibernian
1920–21	St. Anthony's; Division 2: St. Roch's
1921–22	St. Roch's; Division 2: East Kilbride Thistle
1922–23	Duntocher Hibernian; Division 2: Gartsherrie Athletic
1923–24	Baillieston Juniors
1924–25	Baillieston Juniors
1925–26	Kilsyth Rangers; Division 2: Johnstone Rovers
1926–27	Croy Celtic; Division 2: Govan Cleansing Department
1927–28	Maryhill Hibernians
1928–29	Alva Albion Rangers
1929–30	Port Glasgow Athletic Juniors
1930–31	Dumbarton Harp
1931–32	Rothesay Royal Victoria
1932–33	Maryhill Hibernians
1933–34	Milngavie
1934–35	Bute Athletic
1935–36	Rothesay Royal Victoria
1936–37	Rothesay Royal Victoria
1937–38	Grange Rovers
1938–39	St Ninians Thistle
1939–40	Alva Albion Rangers
1940–41	Maryhill Harp
1941–46	No competition
1946–47	Dunoon Athletic

- SJL Victory Cup

Season	Winners
1918–19	St. Anthony's
1919–20	Wishaw YMCA
1920–21	Kilsyth Emmet
1921–22	St. Anthony's
1922–23	Dumbarton Harp
1923–24	Paisley Juniors
1924–25	Bridgeton Waverley
1925–26	Port Glasgow Athletic Juniors
1926–27	Yoker Athletic
1927–28	Dunipace Juniors
1928–29	Dunblane Rovers
1929–30	Dunblane Rovers
1930–31	Kilsyth Rangers
1931–32	Denny Hibernian
1932–33	Bute Athletic
1933–34	St Ninians Thistle
1934–35	Rothesay Royal Victoria
1935–36	Cumbernauld Thistle
1936–37	Forth Rangers
1937–38	Grange Rovers
1938–39	Dunipace Juniors
1939–40	Scottish Dyes
1940–41	Maryhill Harp
1941–46	No competition
1946–47	Alva Albion Rangers

- SJL Victory Consolation Cup

Season	Winners
1919–20	Duntocher Hibernian
1920–21	St. Roch's
1921–22	Condorrat Rovers
1922–23	Dumbarton Juniors
1923–24	Vale of Leven Juniors
1924–25	Duntocher Hibernian
1925–26	Vale of Leven Juniors
1926–27	Govan Cleansing Department
1927–28	Maryhill Hibernians
1928–29	Coats Juniors
1929–30	Port Glasgow Athletic Juniors
1930–31	Grange Rovers
1931–32	Cumbernauld Thistle
1932–33	Milngavie
1933–34	Baillieston Juniors
1934–35	St Francis
1935–36	Twechar United
1936–37	Kilsyth Rangers
1937–38	Baillieston Juniors
1938–39	Twechar United
1939–40	Baillieston Juniors
