= Kevin Welsh (Scottish footballer) =

Scottish footballer

Personal information
- Date of birth: 2 September 1984 (age 42)
- Place of birth: Scotland
- Position: Left back

Senior career*
Years	Team	Apps	(Gls)
–	Harestanes	?	(?)
2009–2010	Hamilton Academical	1	(0)
2009	→ Alloa Athletic (loan)	3	(0)
–	Harestanes	?	(?)
- * Club domestic league appearances and goals as of 14:19, 25 January 2011 (UTC)

Kevin Welsh (born 2 September 1984) is a Scottish professional footballer who plays as a left back.

== Career ==
Welsh played for St Johnstone as a youth but suffered an injury and dropped into amateur football. He moved from amateur side Harestanes to Hamilton Academical of the Scottish Premier League in the summer of 2009, and made his professional debut for Hamilton on 29 August 2009, in a 1–4 loss against Rangers in which he was substituted at half time for David Louhoungou.

He was loaned out to Alloa Athletic for three months on 11 September 2009, making three appearances in the Scottish Football League Second Division.

Welsh was released from his contract with Hamilton Academical on 14 January 2010. He went back into the amateur game and Harestanes, where he won the 2014–15 Scottish Amateur Cup, the first to offer a place in the Scottish Cup. He said that playing in the tournament with his friends meant more than playing against Rangers at Ibrox.
