= Drumchapel Amateur F.C. =

Association football club in Glasgow City, Scotland

Drumchapel Amateurs
- Nickname: The Drum
- Founded: 1950
- Ground: Glenhead Park, Duntocher
- Coordinates: 55°55′32″N 4°24′57″W
- League: Central Scottish AFL Premier Division
- 2018–19: Central Scottish AFL Premier Division, 6th of 12

Drumchapel Amateurs Football Club is a football club from the village of Duntocher, near Clydebank in Scotland. Formed in 1950 in the Drumchapel area of the city of Glasgow, they are nicknamed "The Drum". The club presently competes in the Caledonian Amateur Football League and is viewed as one of the top amateur clubs in the country, winning the Scottish Amateur Cup as recently as 2005.

Former Drumchapel players who later entered professional football include George McLean, Jim Forrest, Alex Willoughby, Alex Ferguson, Walter Smith, David Moyes, Andy Gray, Archie Gemmill, John Wark, Kenny McDowall, Asa Hartford, Eddie McCreadie, John Robertson and Paul Wilson.

Club colours were originally green and white hoops; in the late-1980s the club moved on to red and black. The Drum play their home games at Glenhead Park, which is the former home of junior club Duntocher Hibernian. When Duntocher Hibs became defunct Drumchapel moved in, meaning that they no longer play home games in the area that gives them their name. It does mean they have one of the best playing facilities of any amateur team in Scotland. There is also still a youth system in place below the senior team.

A portrait of club founder Douglas Smith hangs in the Scottish Football Museum at Hampden Park, in recognition of his contribution to the club and the development of young footballers. It was unveiled in 2014 by former Drumchapel player Alex Ferguson.

== Honours ==
- Scottish Amateur Cup:

2004–05

- West of Scotland Amateur Cup:

1986–87, 2002–03

== See also ==
Category:Drumchapel Amateur F.C. players
