= John Murphy (footballer, born 1898) =

Scottish footballer (born 1898)

Personal information
- Full name: John Dickie Elliot Murphy (Note: His parents had yet to marry when he was born, and the certificate bears his mother's maiden surname of Elliot. He lived with his maternal great-aunt in childhood, and on two editions of the census her married name Dickie was given as John's surname (it was also his middle name). He later used his father's surname Murphy.)
- Date of birth: 1898
- Place of birth: Govan, Scotland
- Height: 5 ft 7 in (1.70 m)
- Position: Outside right

Senior career*
Years	Team	Apps	(Gls)
–	St Anthony's		
1919–1925	Heart of Midlothian	142	(40)
1922	→ St Mirren (loan)	0	(0)
1925	→ Hamilton Academical (loan)	0	(0)
1925–1926	Motherwell	18	(3)
1926–1929	Kilmarnock	45	(10)
1928–1929	→ Coleraine (loan)		
1929–1930	Ballymena United		
1930–1931	Shelbourne		
Total		205	(54)
- * Club domestic league appearances and goals

John Dickie Elliot Murphy (born 1898) was a Scottish footballer who played as an outside right. His first and longest senior spell was with Heart of Midlothian where he spent the better part of seven seasons (including brief loans at St Mirren and Hamilton Academical), followed by around a year at Motherwell and 18 months at Kilmarnock. He then moved to the Irish leagues with Coleraine and Ballymena United in County Antrim then Dublin side Shelbourne.
