= Peter Scarff =

Scottish footballer

Personal information
- Date of birth: 29 March 1908
- Place of birth: Linwood, Scotland
- Date of death: 9 December 1933 (aged 25)
- Place of death: Bridge of Weir, Scotland
- Position: Inside left

Youth career
- Linwood St Conval's

Senior career*
Years	Team	Apps	(Gls)
1928–1933	Celtic	97	(51)
1928	→ Maryhill Hibernian (loan)		

International career
1931	Scotland	1	(0)
- * Club domestic league appearances and goals

Peter Scarff (29 March 1908 – 9 December 1933) was a Scottish footballer who played as an inside left.

== Career ==
Born in Linwood, Scarff played club football for Celtic, making his debut in January 1929, shortly before his 21st birthday. He was highly regarded, with observers noting that he could be a successor to Jimmy McMenemy as the team's creative force and acted a foil for the more direct Jimmy McGrory at centre forward.

Scarff scored ten goals in four league matches in early 1930, and by the end of the 1930–31 season, he had firmly established himself in the Celtic team, making 46 appearances as the club won the Glasgow Cup and the Scottish Cup and also generally improved their league form, finishing within two points of champions Rangers in contrast to the 15-point margin in his debut campaign two years earlier. He had made what proved to be his only appearance for Scotland in February 1931 but also experienced tragedy in September that year, being yards from the incident when teammate John Thomson died after receiving an accidental blow to the head during a match.

Scarff never scored another goal after the Thomson incident and within months it was his health that was in serious doubt when he experienced difficulty breathing during matches and was diagnosed with pulmonary tuberculosis. He played his 119th and last match for Celtic in December 1931, aged 23. He soon relocated to a local sanatorium where it was hoped his condition might improve, but despite periods of remission it was confirmed by summer 1933 that he would never play football again; he died in December of that year.
