= Central Scottish Amateur Football League =

- Founded: 1927
- Country: Scotland
- Confederation: UEFA
- Divisions: Premier Division; Division One (A); Division One (B)
- Number of clubs: 36
- Level on pyramid: N/A
- Promotion to: None
- Relegation to: None
- Domestic cup(s): Scottish Amateur Cup; East of Scotland Cup; West of Scotland Cup
- Current champions: Harestanes

The Central Scottish Amateur Football League is a football (soccer) league competition for amateur clubs in the Central Belt of Scotland. It was formed in 1927 and is sponsored by Foster's Lager. The association is affiliated to the Scottish Amateur Football Association. As a stand-alone Association and not part of Scotland's pyramid system, the Premier Division does not act as a feeder league and as such there is currently no promotion available.

The Central Scottish AFL are the current holders of the John Smiths Inter League Trophy.

== League set-up ==
The Central Scottish AFL is split into two divisions, a Premier Division of 12 teams and a 24-strong Division One (split into Division 1A and 1B). The bottom two teams from the Premier League are automatically relegated to Division 1, being replaced by the winners of each of the two sections, and the team which finishes 3rd from bottom is entered into a round-robin playoff with the two teams who finished second in each of Division 1A and Division 1B - the winner secures a place in the Premier Division. Division One sections are determined by a draw at the association's Annual General Meeting.

Level	League(s)/Division(s)	
1	Central Scottish AFL Premier Division; 12 clubs playing 22 games	
2	Central Scottish AFL Division One (A); 12 clubs playing 22 games	Central Scottish AFL Division One (B); 12 clubs playing 22 games

== Member clubs ==
The Central Scottish AFL was composed of thirty-six member clubs, listed below in their respective divisions:

=== Premier Division ===
- Bannockburn AFC
- Cambusnethan Talbot AFC
- Campsie Minerva AFC
- Colville Park AFC
- Drumchapel AFC
- Eastfield AFC
- Greenock HSFP AFC
- Harestanes AFC
- Southside AFC
- Steins Thistle AFC
- St Patricks FP AFC
- Wishaw HSFP AFC

=== Division 1A ===
- Arthurlie AFC
- Bearsden AFC
- Blantyre Celtic AFC
- Clydebank AFC
- Drumchapel United PYM AFC
- Falkirk Community AFC
- FC Clydebank
- Gartcosh United AFC
- Gourock Athletic AFC
- Stedfast KAFC
- Tullibody Community AFC
- Uddingston Anvil AFC

=== Division 1B ===
- Ardencaple AFC
- Blantyre RGM AFC
- Bridgewater AFC
- BSC Glasgow AFC
- Craigneuk AFC
- East Kilbride AFC
- EDU Sport Academy FC
- Fallin AFC
- Garrowhill Thistle AFC
- Mill United AFC
- Newton Vale AFC
- Third Lanark AFC

== Cup competitions ==
As well as the league, the association administers three cup competitions for teams in membership: the Cinema Cup, the League Cup (the Bunrigh Trophy) and the McAvoy and McIntyre Trophy.

=== National and district cups ===
In addition, member clubs are also likely to play in the Scottish Amateur Cup and one of the two district cups (East or West). Below are teams who have won these trophies, whilst playing in the Central Scottish AFL.

==== Scottish Amateur Cup ====
- 1992–93 Bankhall Villa AFC
- 1995–96 Bellshill YMCA AFC
- 2001–02 Harestanes AFC
- 2002–03 Harestanes AFC
- 2006–07 Drumchapel United F.C.
- 2007–08 Eddlewood AFC
- 2009–10 Eddlewood AFC
- 2010–11 Wishaw HSFP
- 2012–13 Wellhouse AFC
- 2014–15 Harestanes AFC
- 2015–16 Colville Park A.F.C.
- 2016–17 Colville Park A.F.C.

==== West of Scotland Amateur Cup ====
- 1951–52 Gartsherrie United AFC
- 1988–89 Knightswood AFC
- 1990–91 Bellshill YMCA AFC
- 2003–04 Wellhouse AFC
- 2004–05 Drumchapel United AFC
- 2005–06 Drumchapel United AFC
- 2007–08 Drumchapel United AFC
- 2009–10 Harestanes AFC
- 2010–11 Drumchapel United AFC
- 2019-20 St Patrick's FP AFC

==== East of Scotland Amateur Cup ====
- 2000–01 Spartans AFC
- 2001–02 Aberforth Rangers AFC
- 2002–03 Aberforth Rangers AFC
- 2003–04 Tullibody AFC
