= John Duffy (footballer, born 1929) =

Scottish footballer

Personal information
- Full name: John Gerard Duffy
- Date of birth: 24 August 1929
- Place of birth: Dundee, Scotland
- Date of death: 4 May 2004 (aged 74)
- Place of death: Dundee, Scotland
- Position: Wing half

Senior career*
Years	Team	Apps	(Gls)
–	Hill of Beath Hawthorn		
–	St Anthony's		
1952–1954	Celtic	2	(0)
1953–1954	→ Arbroath (loan)	28	(5)
1954–1960	Southend United	114	(4)
- * Club domestic league appearances and goals

John Gerard Duffy (24 August 1929 – 4 May 2004) was a Scottish footballer who played as a wing half in junior football for St Anthony's, in the Scottish League for Celtic and Arbroath, and in the English Football League for Southend United, for whom he made more than 100 appearances.
