= Kingdom of Fife AFA =

- Founded: 2017
- Country: Scotland
- Confederation: UEFA
- Divisions: 3
- Number of clubs: 28
- Level on pyramid: N/A
- Promotion to: None
- Relegation to: None
- Domestic cup: Scottish Amateur Cup Fife Cup
- Current champions: Cupar Hearts
- Website: Official website

The Kingdom of Fife AFA is a football league competition for amateur clubs in the Fife peninsula of Scotland. The league was created in 2017 with the merger of the Kingdom Caledonian Amateur Football Association and Fife Amateur Football Association. The association is affiliated to the Scottish Amateur Football Association and for the 2024/25 season had 28 clubs across three divisions.

== 2024–25 league members ==
=== Premier League ===
- Balgonie Scotia
- Benarty Astros
- Cupar Hearts
- Greig Park Rangers
- Leven United
- Leslie Hearts
- Lochgelly United
- Markinch
- Methilhill Strollers
- The Swifts

=== Championship ===
- Bridge of Earn
- Eastvale
- Fife Thistle
- Kinross Colts
- Leven
- Lumphinnans Hearts
- Pittenweem Rovers
- St Andrews Amateurs
- Bowhill Rovers

=== Conference ===
- Auchtermuchty Bellvue
- Burntisland United
- Inverkeithing United
- Kennoway Star Hearts
- Kettle United
- Pitreavie United
- Rosebank Rangers
- Rosyth
- St Monans Swallows

== Previous Members ==
- Aberdour SDC
- Kirkland Villa AFC
- Kirkcaldy Rovers
- Lomond Victoria AFC
- St Andrews AFC
- FC Bayside
- Strathmiglo United
- Kingdom Athletic
- Glenrothes Strollers (applied to join the East of Scotland Football League, but were rejected)

== Champions ==
Season	Premier League	Championship	First Division
2017–18	Bowhill Rovers	Kirkcaldy YMCA	Kennoway AFC
2018–19	Bowhill Rovers	Balgonie Scotia	Eastvale
2019–20	Leven United	Kinross	Lochgelly United
2020–21	No competition (season suspended due to COVID-19)		
2021–22	Cupar Hearts	Strathmiglo United	Benarty Astros
2022–23	Cupar Hearts		
2023–24	Cupar Hearts	Leslie Hearts	Bowhill Rovers
2024–25	Greig Park Rangers	Bowhill Rovers	Burntisland United
