= Dingwall F.C. =

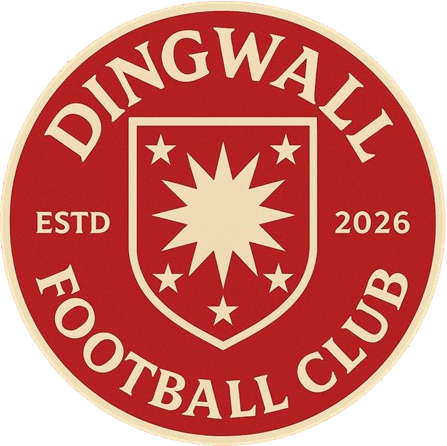
- Founded: 2026
- Ground: Highland Football Academy
- Coordinates: 57°35′45″N 4°25′9″W
- League: North Caledonian Football League

Dingwall F.C. is a Scottish football club based in the town of Dingwall in the Scottish Highlands. They currently play in the North Caledonian Football League.

Formed in 2026, the club announced its intent to compete in the 2026–27 season, and was officially accepted into the North Caledonian Football League on 11 June 2026 at the league's Pre-Season AGM.
