= Fife Amateur Football Association =

- Founded: 2000
- Folded: 2017
- Country: Scotland
- Confederation: UEFA
- Divisions: 3
- Number of clubs: 30
- Level on pyramid: N/A
- Promotion to: None
- Relegation to: None
- Domestic cup(s): Scottish Amateur Cup Fife Cup
- Website: Official website

The Fife Amateur Football Association (FAFA) was a football (soccer) league competition for amateur clubs in the Fife peninsula of Scotland. The association is affiliated to the Scottish Amateur Football Association. The association had three divisions.

The league folded in 2017 and merged with the Kingdom Caledonian Amateur Football Association to create the Kingdom of Fife AFA.

== League membership ==
In order to join the association, clubs need to apply and are then voted in by current member clubs.

== 2015-16 league members ==
=== Premier Division ===
- Buckhaven Town
- Burntisland United
- Dysart FC
- Fossoway FC
- Kingdom Athletic FC
- Kirkcaldy YMCA
- Pittenweem Rovers FC
- Rosyth FC
- St Andrews University
- Valleyfield FC

=== Division One ===
- AM Soccer Club
- Auchtermuchty Bellvue
- Denbeath FC
- Fife Thistle FC
- Hearts of Beath FC
- Inverkeithing Hillfield Swifts
- Leslie Hearts FC
- Methilhill Strollers
- Rosebank AFC
- St Andrews Amateurs FC

=== Division Two ===
- FC Bayside
- Freuchie
- Glenrothes Athletic FC
- Glenrothes Strollers FC
- Kingseat Athletic FC
- Kirkcaldy Rovers FC
- Lomond United FC
- Lomond Victoria FC
- St Monans Swallows
- United Colleges
