= Kingdom Caledonian Amateur Football Association =

- Founded: 1984
- Folded: 2017
- Country: Scotland
- Confederation: UEFA
- Divisions: 1
- Number of clubs: 12
- Level on pyramid: N/A
- Promotion to: None
- Relegation to: None
- Domestic cup(s): Scottish Amateur Cup; Fife Cup
- Last champions: Bowhill Rovers
- Website: Official website

The Kingdom Caledonian Amateur Football Association (KCAFA) was a football (soccer) league competition for amateur clubs in the Fife area of Scotland. It was formed in 1984 when the top sides from the East Fife A.F.A. and the Kirkcaldy & District A. F. L. broke away and amalgamated with the aim of creating a highly competitive league with fewer games in an effort to raise the quality and the profile of amateur football in Fife. The association was affiliated to the Scottish Amateur Football Association.

The association was composed of one single division, the Kingdom Caledonian Football League. The league folded in 2017 and merged with the Fife Amateur Football Association to create the Kingdom of Fife AFA.

== League membership ==
In order to join the association, clubs need to apply and are then voted in by current member clubs.

=== Last members ===
(as of 2016–17 season)

- Aberdour Sporting Development Club AFC (previously Rosyth Civil Service AFC)
- Balgonie Scotia 1896 AFC
- Bowhill Rovers AFC
- Cupar Hearts AFC
- Eastvale AFC
- Falkland AFC
- Glenrothes AFC
- Greig Park Rangers AFC
- Kettle United AFC
- Kinross AFC
- Leven United AFC
- Lumphinnans United AFC
- Strathmiglo United AFC

=== Previous members ===
- Aberdour
- Auchtermuchty Bellvue
- Ballingry Rovers (Scottish Junior Football Association)
- Benarty (Folded)
- Blairhall Village (Folded)
- Buckhaven Villa
- Burntisland Shipyard
- Burntisland United
- Cowdenbeath (Folded)
- Fair City
- Hill of Beath Ramblers
- Inverkeithing Hillfield Swifts (Fife Amateur Football Association)
- Kinglassie
- Kirkland (Folded)
- Star Hearts (Scottish Junior Football Association)
- Lomond Victoria (Fife Amateur Football Association)
- Milnathort
- Norton House (Folded)
- Tayport (Scottish Junior Football Association)
- Victoria Rovers
- Windygates
- Woodside Athletic

== Past winners ==
- 1984–85 – Ballingry Rovers
- 1985–86 – Strathmiglo United
- 1986–87 – ?
- 1987–88 – Star Hearts
- 1988–89 – ?
- 1989–90 – ?
- 1990–91 – Norton House
- 1991–92 – Strathmiglo United
- 1992–93 – Norton House
- 1993–94 – ?
- 1994–95 – ?
- 1995–96 – Norton House
- 1996–97 – Benarty
- 1997–98 – Fair City
- 1998–99 – Fair City
- 1999–00 – Norton House
- 2000–01 – Cupar Hearts
- 2001–02 – Norton House
- 2002–03 – Eastvale
- 2003–04 – Eastvale
- 2004–05 – Eastvale
- 2005–06 – Strathmiglo United
- 2006–07 – Rosyth Civil Service
- 2007–08 – Cupar Hearts
- 2008–09 – Leven United
- 2009–10 – Cupar Hearts
- 2010–11 – Cupar Hearts
- 2011–12 – Cupar Hearts
- 2012–13 – Cupar Hearts
- 2013–14 – Bowhill Rovers
- 2014–15 – Greig Park Rangers
- 2015–16 – Leven United
- 2016–17 – Bowhill Rovers
