= Peter Lamb (footballer) =

Scottish footballer (1925–1978)

Personal information
- Date of birth: 9 June 1925
- Place of birth: New Monkland, Scotland
- Date of death: 11 July 1978 (aged 53)
- Place of death: Alloa, Scotland
- Position: Right back

Senior career*
| Years | Team | Apps | (Gls) |
- St Anthony's
| 1946–1947 | Celtic | 1 | (0) |
| 1947–1949 | Alloa Athletic | 47 | (0) |
| Total | | 48 | (0) |
- * Club domestic league appearances and goals

Peter Lamb (9 June 1925 – 11 July 1978) was a Scottish professional footballer who played as a right back.

== Career ==
Lamb played for St Anthony's, before signing to Celtic for one season from 1946 to 1947, and then played for Alloa Athletic from 1947 to 1949.

== Personal life and death ==
Lamb was born in New Monkland on 9 June 1925. He married Bridget Gallagher, who predeceased him. After his football career, he worked as an electrician. Lamb died from lung cancer in Alloa on 11 July 1978, at the age of 53.
