= St Anthony's F.C. =

Association football club in Scotland

St Anthony's
- Full name: St Anthony's Football Club
- Nickname: The Ants
- Founded: 1902
- Ground: McKenna Park, Glasgow
- Coordinates: 55°51′27″N 4°20′39″W
- Chairman: Fred Barrows
- Manager: vacant
- League: West of Scotland League Third Division
- 2025–26: West of Scotland League Third Division, 14th of 16
- Website: www.theants.co.uk
Home colours	Away colours

St Anthony's Football Club is a Scottish non-league football club based in Glasgow. Nicknamed the Ants, they play in green-and-white hooped kits and currently operate in the West of Scotland League Third Division.

== History ==
Founded in 1902, they were members of the Scottish Junior Football Association from that time until 2020 when all local clubs moved to the new West of Scotland Football League, becoming part of the senior football pyramid for the first time.

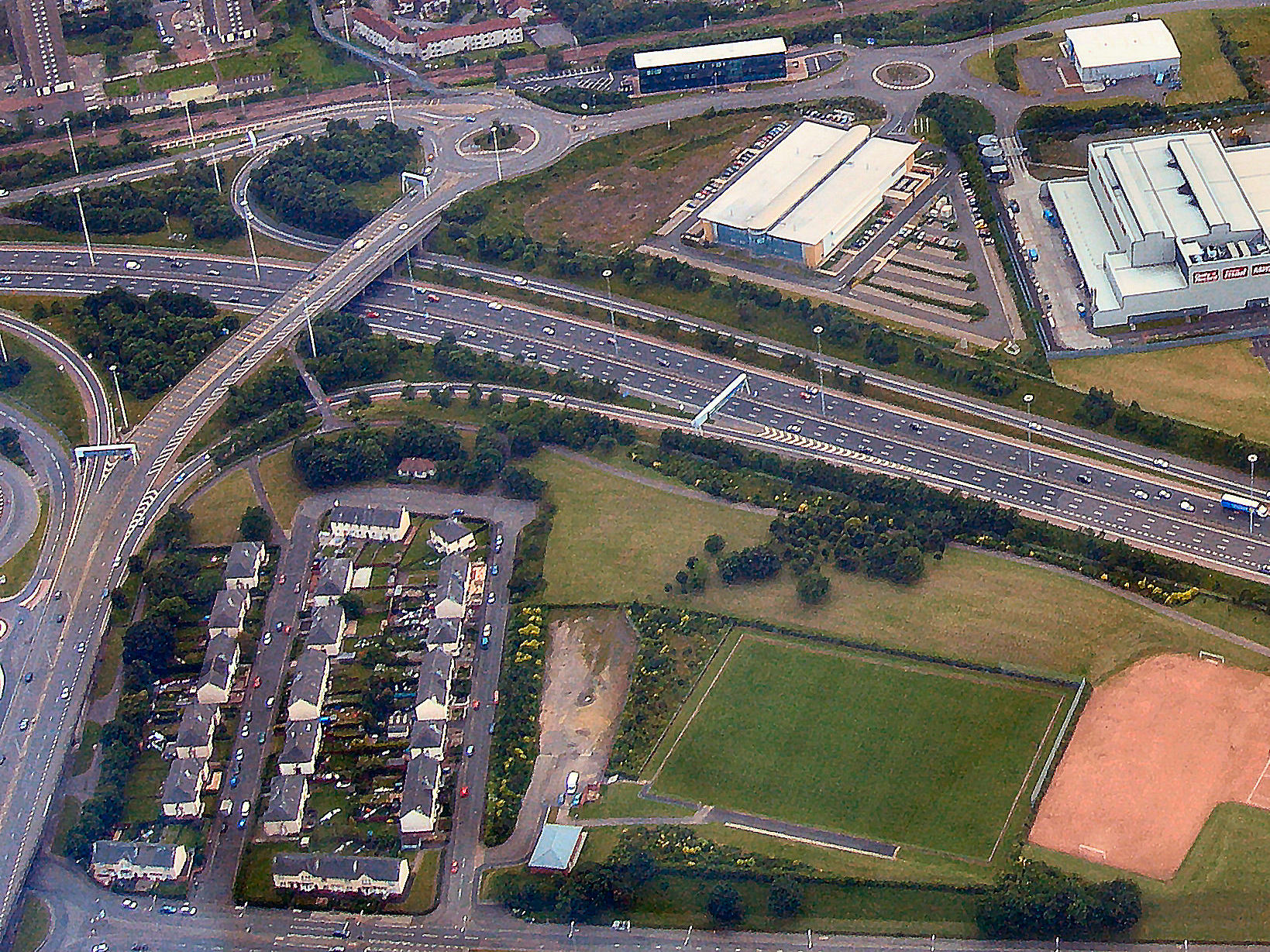
Aerial view of McKenna Park (2010)

St Anthony's were originally based in the heart of Govan and then played at two grounds on either side of the Moorepark neighbourhood close to Ibrox Stadium, home of Rangers, until the 1990s; Since 2003 their home ground is McKenna Park in Shieldhall, directly north of the M8 motorway (the road was built through Cardonald Park and so the ground is often referred to as being located in the Cardonald district, although it lies on the other side of the motorway).

The team reached the final of the Scottish Junior Cup on two occasions (1919 and 1925) but never lifted the trophy. They won honours in the Scottish Junior League up to 1922 when they joined the more prestigious Glasgow League, remaining with that group in the subsequent decades through the Intermediate, Central and West Region eras, into the 21st century. They were West of Scotland Junior Cup winners in 1938, but never seriously challenged for major honours after World War II.

== Notable former players ==
The following players all represented Scotland at full international level after stepping up to Senior football direct from St. Anthony's:

- Bobbie Bruce – Aberdeen and Middlesbrough
- Ginger Dunn – Hibernian and Everton; One of the 1928 Wembley Wizards
- Bobby Evans – 535 first-team appearances for Celtic, 48 Scotland caps and inducted to the Scottish Football Hall of Fame in 2008; Also played for Chelsea
- John Gilchrist – Celtic
- Tommy McInally – Celtic
- John Reid McKay – Celtic, Blackburn Rovers and Middlesbrough

The following former St Anthony's players played for clubs in the Scottish Football League and/or English Football League:

- Billy Craig – Celtic
- John Duffy – Celtic, Arbroath, Southend United
- George Ferguson – Celtic
- Willie Gallacher – Celtic, Falkirk, Ayr United, St Johnstone
- Peter Lamb – Celtic, Alloa Athletic
- Matt Lynch – Celtic
- John Murphy – Heart of Midlothian, Motherwell, Kilmarnock
- Willie O'Neill – Celtic, Carlisle United
- Norman Thomson – Dumbarton, Hibernian and nine English Football League clubs
- Johnny Quigley – Nottingham Forest, Huddersfield Town, Bristol City, Mansfield Town
