= Tynecastle F.C. =

Association football club in Scotland

Tynecastle
- Full name: Tynecastle Football Club
- Founded: 1928 as Tynecastle Boys Club
- Ground: Meggetland, Edinburgh
- Capacity: 4,388 (500 seated)
- Coordinates: 55°55′41″N 3°14′4″W
- Chairman: Douglas Dalgleish
- Manager: Ross Lyle
- League: East of Scotland League Second Division
- 2025–26: East of Scotland League First Division, 15th of 16 (relegated)
- Website: http://www.tynecastlefc.co.uk
Home colours

Tynecastle Football Club are a Scottish football team playing in the East of Scotland League Second Division. The club was formed in 2005 by the merger of Tynecastle Boys Club and Tollcross United. They play at the Meggetland Sports Complex in Edinburgh.

== History ==
The original Tynecastle Boys Club were formed in 1928, and the club take this to be the date of their formation as can be seen on the club crest. As a youth team, a number of young footballers played for Tynecastle Boys Club on their way to successful careers. Former Scotland captain Darren Fletcher played for Tynecastle during the 1990s.

On 5 June 2005, Tynecastle Boys Club merged with East of Scotland Football League side Tollcross United to form Tynecastle F.C. This merger meant that Tynecastle were admitted to senior levels of Scottish football for the first time, taking Tollcross United's place in The East of Scotland Football League First Division. Tynecastle's chairman, Douglas Dalgliesh said of the merger: "The coming together of the two organisations will be of enormous benefit. Having a team in the East of Scotland Association is seen as another step forward in our plan for growth." Tollcross United secretary, Alastair Wilkie added: "For some time now we have struggled to encourage younger players to join and the tie up with such a club as Tynecastle is the only way forward. It is sad that the Tollcross name will disappear after all those years but we need to look to the future and the new set up will allow us to move forward." On 5 August, the club played their first ever senior match, a pre-season friendly against Scottish Premier League side Hibernian. The match ended in a very credible 2–2 draw, thanks to a last minute Tynecastle equaliser.

On 5 December 2005, Keith Summers was appointed as the first team manager of the club. He had previously been interim manager for just over a month, following the departure of Ronnie Dignan on 25 October.

On 13 November 2007, the club received a windfall of £114,000 after former player and Scotland goalkeeper Craig Gordon was transferred from Hearts to Sunderland for £9 million. Chairman Douglas Dalgliesh said: "We thought that if a player was over twenty-three we wouldn't be entitled to any money, so it was a shock to receive this news." He added: "We've always lived from year-to-year and month-to-month, but now we have funding like we've never had before." Gordon said of the news: "I'm sure it will keep them going for years to come and hopefully it will nurture a few boys through to play in the SPL."

In January 2008, the club set up a sister club in the American city of Everett, Snohomish County, Washington called Tynecastle International F.C. It was set up by former Tynecastle and Bolton Wanderers player and resident of Everett, David Hoggan. Under the initiative, young players from the US will be given professional coaching and take to the field in the traditional maroon of their Edinburgh counterparts.

In the 2007–08 season, Tynecastle finished 3rd in the East of Scotland League First Division. This was their highest league finish since the team were formed, having previously finished 5th in 2006–07 and 9th in 2005–06. At the start of the 2008–09 season, former Livingston and Gretna striker, David Bingham was appointed as player/coach of the club. He joined former Hearts player Gary Mackay on the coaching staff at Tynecastle. On 16 May 2009, Tynecastle defeated Gretna 2008 4–0 to secure the East of Scotland League First Division title, and as a result were promoted to the Premier Division for the 2009–10 season.

In August 2009, Tynecastle was awarded the SFA Quality Mark, which is awarded to show good practice in on and off field matters. Tynecastle also opened the new Fernieside Recreational Ground pavilion with a game against a Heart of Midlothian XI, the new pavilion was given to Tynecastle on a long-term lease.

The club gained promotion to the Premier Division for 2020–21 after winning First Division Conference B in the curtailed 2019–20 season.

== Colours and badge ==
The club's home kit is a maroon design similar to the home kit of Heart of Midlothian, but with a white swoosh across the shoulder. In 2008, the club announced a new sponsorship deal with a local Indian restaurant. It was also announced that they would be playing in a new yellow away kit during the 2008–09.

The club's badge displays an image of a castle over the top of large maroon 'T'. To the top of the logo, the words 'Founded 1928' are displayed in a yellow banner and similarly, 'Edinburgh' is displayed in a yellow banner beneath the Logo. The words 'Tynecastle' and 'Club' are written in a maroon text above and below the rest of the badge respectively.

== Stadium ==
Tynecastle moved to the Meggetland Sports Complex in 2018, where they share the main stadium grass pitch with Boroughmuir RFC. They originally played at the Fernieside Recreation Ground, which had been Tollcross United's home since 1971, before sharing Saughton Enclosure with Lothian Thistle Hutchison Vale from 2015.

== Current squad ==
As of 4 July 2025

Note: Flags indicate national team as defined under FIFA eligibility rules; some limited exceptions apply. Players may hold more than one non-FIFA nationality.

No.	Pos.	Nation	Player
1	GK	SCO	Murray Jackson
2	DF	SCO	Liam O'Donnell
3	DF	SCO	Alex Chingwalu
4	DF	SCO	Michael Langdale
6	MF	SCO	Kieran Mooney
7	MF	SCO	Matthew Combe
8	MF	SCO	Sean Linden
9	FW	SCO	Kenny Fisher (Captain)
12	DF	SCO	Jack Chesser

No.	Pos.	Nation	Player
14	FW	SCO	Aaron Murrell
16	DF	SCO	Gary Hamilton
17	MF	SCO	Fletcher Hendry
18	MF	SCO	Ethan Wynne
19	DF	SCO	James Redpath
22	DF	SCO	Dominic Savage
24	MF	SCO	Russell Cairns

== Honours ==
East of Scotland Football League First Division

- Winners: 2008–09, 2019–20 (Conference B)

Alex Jack Cup

- Winners: 2017–18

South & East of Scotland Cup-Winners Shield

- Winners: 2017–18
