= John Duffy (footballer, born 1886) =

English footballer

Personal information
- Date of birth: 1886
- Place of birth: Cleator Moor, Cumberland, England
- Position: Centre half

Senior career*
Years	Team	Apps	(Gls)
- Workington
1909–1910	Bradford City	1	(0)
- Exeter City
- Swansea Town
- * Club domestic league appearances and goals

John Duffy (born 1886) was an English professional footballer who played as a centre half.

== Career ==
Duffy played for Workington, Bradford City, Exeter City, and Swansea Town.

For Bradford City he made one appearance in the Football League.

== Sources ==
- Frost, Terry (1988). Bradford City A Complete Record 1903–1988. Breedon Books Sport. ISBN 0-907969-38-0.
