= John Duffy (footballer, born 1922) =

Scottish footballer

Personal information
- Full name: John Duffy
- Date of birth: 24 April 1922
- Place of birth: Glasgow, Scotland
- Date of death: 10 April 1996 (aged 73)
- Place of death: Glasgow, Scotland
- Position: Right back

Senior career*
Years	Team	Apps	(Gls)
1946–1949	Clyde	28	(0)
1949–1954	Norwich City	78	(0)
–	Great Yarmouth Town		
- * Club domestic league appearances and goals

John Duffy (24 April 1922 – 10 April 1996) was a Scottish footballer, who played as a right back in the Scottish League for Clyde, in the English Football League for Norwich City, and in English non-league football for Great Yarmouth Town.
