= Baillieston Juniors F.C. =

Association football club in Glasgow City, Scotland

Coordinates: 55.848280°N 4.105982°W

Baillieston Juniors
- Full name: Baillieston Juniors Football Club
- Founded: 1919
- Dissolved: 2005
- Ground: Station Park; Baillieston
- League: Scottish Junior League; 1921–1922, 1923–1927, 1929–1940; Glasgow Junior League; 1922–1923; Scottish Intermediate League; 1927–1929; Central Junior League; 1946–2002; West Region Central District League; 2002–2003
Home colours

Baillieston Juniors Football Club were a Scottish football club based in Baillieston, Glasgow, who played in Scottish Junior Football Association competitions from 1919 until 2003. They won the Scottish Junior Cup once, in 1980.

== History ==
The club was formed in 1919 and made an immediate impression on the Junior game. They reached their first Scottish Junior Cup final in 1924, losing to Parkhead after a replay and won back-to-back titles in the Scottish Junior League. Baillieston joined the rebels in the Intermediate dispute and won the first ever Intermediate league championship in 1927–28 however the club were enticed back under the wing of the SJFA and they rejoined the Scottish Junior League in 1929.

In amongst the larger clubs in the Central Junior League after World War II, Baillieston enjoyed moderate success with another Junior Cup final appearance in 1965, losing to Linlithgow Rose. Their greatest era came in the early 80's when the club reached three Junior Cup finals in five years. Victory over Benburb in a second replay saw the club lift the trophy in 1980. They lost out however in their two subsequent appearances against Blantyre Victoria in 1982 and Bo'ness United in 1984.

The club sold their Station Park ground to a developer in 2000 with the aim of moving to a purpose-built stadium in the Easterhouse area of Glasgow. They initially groundshared with Glasgow Perthshire and St. Roch's before playing a full season away from home but with the nomadic situation draining funds earmarked for the new ground, Baillieston took non-playing membership of the SJFA in 2003. With no plan for a ground ever coming to fruition, the club effectively dissolved in 2005 with the Baillieston Juniors name kept going by local youth sides.

Former Baillieston players include Bobby Main, Andrew Anderson and Davie Wilson who all went on to earn full international caps for Scotland, Crawford Baptie and Andy Walker. Walker was a member of Baillieston's losing Junior Cup final side in 1984. Other ex-players notable for careers away from football are the politician Tommy Sheridan and the boxer Willie Limond.

== Colours ==
The club's colours were black and white, usually in striped shirts.

== Honours ==
- Scottish Junior Cup winners: 1979–80
  - Runners-up: 1923–24, 1964–65, 1981–82, 1983–84
- Scottish Intermediate League winners: 1927–28
- Scottish Junior League winners: 1923–24, 1924–25
- Central Junior League winners: 1959–60
- West of Scotland Junior Cup winners: 1952–53

== Sources ==
- Scottish Football Historical Archive
