= Caledonian Amateur Football League =

Scottish football league

- Founded: 1983
- Country: Scotland
- Confederation: Scottish Amateur Football Association
- Divisions: 2
- Number of clubs: 28
- Level on pyramid: N/A
- Promotion to: 2
- Relegation to: 2
- Domestic cup: Scottish Amateur Cup
- Current champions: St Josephs
- Website: http://www.caledonianleague.co.uk

The Caledonian League is a football (soccer) league competition for amateur clubs in Scotland. It was formed in 1983 by inviting top amateur clubs, based in Scotland, with good facilities with high standards being set for admittance to the league Since its formation, the teams competing within the league have been of a good standard, with clubs from the league winning the Scottish Amateur Cup on nine occasions, also providing four losing finalists.

Member clubs are based across Argyll and Bute, Glasgow, West Dunbartonshire, and Stirlingshire.

Like several other amateur leagues, it is a stand-alone association and is not currently part of Scotland's pyramid system.

== League structure ==
The Caledonian League is split into two divisions, a Premier Division of 12 clubs and a Division One of 16 clubs. The following model is valid as of season 2024–25:

== Member clubs ==
The Caledonian League has 28 member clubs, listed below in their divisions:

=== Premier Division ===
- Doune Castle AFC
- Dumbarton Academy FP AFC
- Dunipace AFC
- Eaglesham AFC
- East Kilbride YM AFC
- Giffnock North AFC
- Glasgow Harp AFC
- St Joseph’s AFC
- St Mungos AFC
- Strathclyde University FC
- Westerlands AFC
- Wishaw Wycombe Wanderers AFC

=== Division One ===
- Alva AFC
- Bannockburn AFC
- Callander Thistle AFC
- Cambria AFC
- Campsie Minerva AFC
- Cambusbarron Rovers AFC
- Drumchapel Amateurs FC
- Gartcosh United FC
- Glasgow University FC
- Milton AFC
- Rhu AFC
- Riverside AFC
- Rothesay Brandane AFC
- St Patricks FPFC
- Stenhousemuir Community AFC
- Stirling University
