= Tollcross United F.C. =

Former association football club in Scotland

Tollcross United
- Full name: Tollcross United Football Club
- Nickname(s): The Cross
- Founded: 1971
- Dissolved: 2005
- Ground: Fernieside Recreation Park, Edinburgh
| Home colours | Away colours |

Tollcross United Football Club was a football club based in Edinburgh, Scotland, who played in the East of Scotland Football League from 1987 until 2005.

Formed in 1971, they played at the Fernieside Recreation Ground and wore red strips with white sleeves. Their highest end of season league placing as Tollcross United was ninth in the East of Scotland Premier Division in season 1992-93 (with 13 points from 18 matches played) and again in season 1998-99 (with 9 points from 18 matches).

In 2005 they merged with Tynecastle Boys Club to become Tynecastle.

== Honours ==
Alex Jack Cup

- Winners: 1997–98
