= Duntocher Hibernian F.C. =

Association football club in West Dunbartonshire, Scotland

Coordinates: 55.92575°N 4.416740°W

Duntocher Hibernian
- Full name: Duntocher Hibernian Football Club
- Founded: 1894
- Dissolved: 1980
- Ground: Glenhead Park; Duntocher
- League: Scottish Junior League; 1919–27; Scottish Intermediate League; 1927–31; Central Junior League; 1931–66, 1973–80

Duntocher Hibernian Football Club were a Scottish Junior football club from the village of Duntocher, West Dunbartonshire, who played in three spells over a period of 86 years. Based at Glenhead Park from 1929, the club colours were green with white sleeves.

== History ==
Founded in 1894 as a juvenile side, they turned Junior in 1896 and came to prominence by reaching the semi-finals of the Scottish Junior Cup in 1899, losing 2–0 to Parkhead. A group of players broke away from this side to form the club that became Clydebank Juniors. This first incarnation of the Hibs became defunct in 1909.

Revived in 1919, the club joined the Scottish Junior League, enjoying immediate success with promotion in their first season and becoming league champions in 1923. Later that decade, Duntocher sided with the rebels during the Intermediate dispute and joined the breakaway Scottish Intermediate League upon its formation in 1927. It was during the 1950s however, that the team had its most successful period, reaching the West of Scotland Cup final in 1954, losing to Kilsyth Rangers, followed by the Scottish Junior Cup final in 1955 only to lose to the same opposition after a replay. The first game at Hampden Park was watched by a crowd of 64,976. The club also won the Central League championship decider on two occasions, defeating Benburb in 1951 and Parkhead in 1958.

They were to reach the semi-final of the Junior Cup in 1957, losing out to Banks O' Dee and were runners-up to Pollok in the Pompey Cup in the 1958–59 season. During this spell they were managed by Willie Walsh and Jim McLean. After a period in abeyance between 1966 and 1973, the club name was revived by the new tenants of Glenhead Park, Drumchapel Amateurs, for a third spell. Despite some reasonable success, financial pressures forced the club out of the Junior game for a final time in 1980.

== Notable players ==
Numerous players stepped up to Senior football from the club over the years. Hibs also had sixteen players capped for the Scotland Junior international team. These capped players include:

- Paddy Crerand – Celtic, Manchester United and Scotland
- Dick Beattie – Celtic goalkeeper in the 1957 Scottish League Cup Final, later to receive a lifetime ban from the game for involvement in the British betting scandal of 1964.
- Edward Maxwell – Celtic 1958.
- Dennis Gillespie – Originally stepped up to Alloa. Over 400 appearances for Dundee United and inducted to that club's Hall of Fame.
- Frank McDougall-Clydebank F.C., St. Mirren F.C. and Aberdeen F.C.

== Stadium ==
The club originally played at Fore Park in Duntocher before moving to St Helena Park in the neighbouring village of Hardgate. After purchasing a field from a local farmer in 1924, the club embarked on a project to build their own stadium using local volunteer labour. This new ground, known as Glenhead Park, was eventually opened on 6 September 1929. Duntocher closed down in 1940 for the duration of the war and Glenhead was badly damaged in the 1941 Clydebank Blitz. When the club reformed in 1946, Hibs groundshared for two seasons at New Kilbowie Park with Clydebank Juniors. They resumed playing at Glenhead in August 1948 and the ground would remain the club's home until their demise in 1980. After Hibs folded for the second time, the ground was taken over by the current occupiers, Drumchapel Amateurs. Clydebank used the ground under a five-year deal with Drumchapel on their return to the Junior grade in 2003 before departing to groundshare with Yoker Athletic.

In the early 2000s there was talk locally of restarting the 'Hibs', albeit at the same time a proposal was made for Drumchapel Amateurs to move to Knightswood in north-west Glasgow and have Glenhead Park sold for development, which was not well received by locals due its long association with the defunct club. In 2013 Duntocher Hibernian was reformed at amateur level, initially playing in the Mountblow neighbourhood of Clydebank south of Duntocher; in 2017 the club moved 'back' to Glenhead Park at the invitation of Drumchapel Amateurs.

== Honours ==
- Scottish Junior League:
  - champions: 1922–23
- Central League Championship:
  - champions: 1950–51, 1957–58
- SJFL Division Two:
  - champions: 1919–20
- Central League Division B:
  - champions: 1975–76
- Central League Cup:
  - winners: 1956–57
- SJFL Victory Consolation Cup:
  - winners: 1919–20, 1924–25
- Pompey Cup:
  - winners: 1949–50
- Challenge Cup:
  - winners: 1948-49

== Sources ==
- Scottish Football Historical Archive
- Player Database
