= Joël Thomas =

French footballer (born 1987)

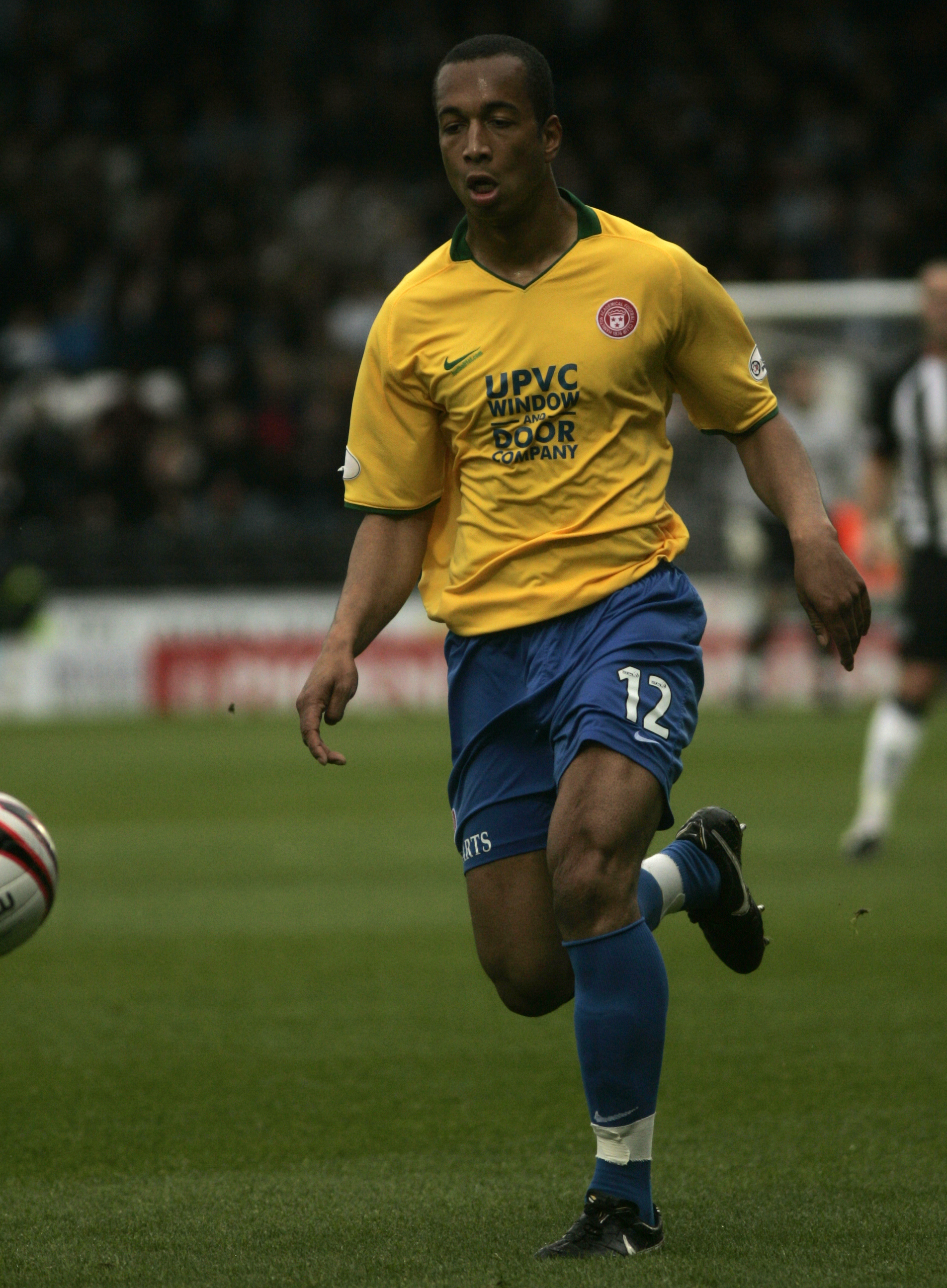
- Thomas playing for Hamilton Academical

Personal information
- Full name: Joël Fabrice Goho Bah Thomas
- Date of birth: 30 June 1987 (age 39)
- Place of birth: Caen, France
- Height: 1.90 m (6 ft 3 in)
- Position: Forward

Youth career
- Caen
- Bordeaux

Senior career*
Years	Team	Apps	(Gls)
2005–2007	Bordeaux	28	(9)
2007	1. FC Kaiserslautern	4	(2)
2008–2009	Hamilton Academical	26	(3)
2009–2010	Colchester United	4	(0)
2009–2010	→ Hamilton Academical (loan)	11	(3)
2010	Hamilton Academical	3	(0)
2011	Ionikos	9	(3)
2012–2013	Turnu Severin	27	(6)
2013–2014	Dinamo București	15	(2)
2015	CA Bastia	1	(0)
2016	Raith Rovers	8	(3)
2016–2017	FC Dordrecht	32	(7)
2017	FC Oss	0	(0)
2017–2018	FC Eindhoven	17	(5)
2019	UE Engordany	0	(0)
Total		185	(43)
- * Club domestic league appearances and goals

Joël Fabrice Goho Bah Thomas (born 30 June 1987) is a French footballer who last played for Andorran Primera Divisió side UE Engordany.

== Club career ==
Thomas joined Bordeaux in 2005, and spent two years with them, before moving to Germany with Kaiserslautern. In August 2008, he had a trial with Premier League club Wigan Athletic in August. Shortly after that, Thomas joined Hamilton Accies. He scored in the League Cup tie against Clyde.

He signed for Colchester for a fee of £125,000, on 21 July 2009 from Hamilton Academical.

He rejoined Hamilton Accies on loan in January 2010.

His contract with Colchester United was terminated by mutual consent on 31 July 2010.

On 12 August 2010, Hamilton signed free agent Thomas for a third time ahead of the new SPL season.

Thomas signed a contract of six-month in Greece for Ionikos on 27 January 2011.

In June 2013, Thomas signed a contract for three years with Dinamo București. His first goals for Dinamo were scored in a Romanian Cup game, against Chindia Târgoviște. He was released in December 2015.

On 1 March 2016, it was confirmed that Thomas had signed for Raith Rovers.

In February 2019, he joined UE Engordany.

== International career ==
Thomas is eligible to play for France through birth, Ivory Coast through lineage, and was coveted by Mali, while he was playing for Colchester.
