= David Louhoungou =

French-Congolese footballer (born 1989)

Personal information
- Full name: David Percy Aymeri Louhoungou
- Date of birth: 28 February 1989 (age 37)
- Place of birth: Paris, France
- Height: 1.85 m (6 ft 1 in)
- Position: Midfielder

Youth career
- 2002–2005: INF Clairefontaine
- 2005–2006: Rennes

Senior career*
Years	Team	Apps	(Gls)
2006–2009	Rennes B	34	(0)
2009	Hamilton Academical	6	(0)
2010	Kocaelispor	1	(0)
2010–2012	Boulogne	0	(0)
2011–2012	→ Cannes (loan)	20	(1)
2012–2013	Beauvais	28	(0)
2013–2014	JSM Béjaïa	4	(0)
2014–2015	Rezé		
2015	Roye-Noyon	5	(0)

International career
2009–2013	Congo	11	(0)
- * Club domestic league appearances and goals

David Percy Aymeri Louhoungou (born 28 February 1989) is a former professional footballer who played as a midfielder. Born in France, he represented Congo at an international level, making 11 appearances.

== Club career ==
Born in Paris, Louhoungou began his career in his youth through INF Clairefontaine and joined Rennes in 2005. On 5 August 2009, Louhoungou signed for the Scottish club Hamilton Academical. He left Hamilton on 12 December 2009 and signed on 1 February 2010 for Turkish side Kocaelispor. Louhoungou joined US Boulogne on 21 September 2010 and spent the 2011–12 season on loan at AS Cannes before joining AS Beauvais in 2012.

Louhoungou went on trial at Conference National side Gatehsead in July 2013. He played the first half of Gateshead's 2–1 pre-season friendly win over Partick Thistle on 6 July and the second half against Barrow four days later, but was released after two weeks at the club. He subsequently joined JSM Béjaïa in January 2014.

After being released by Béjaïa, Louhoungou spent the 2014–15 season with amateur club Rezé in the French seventh division. On 4 June 2015, it was announced that the midfielder had joined Championnat de France amateur side US Roye-Noyon ahead of the 2015–16 campaign.

== International career ==
Louhoungou is a former member of the Congo national team. He made his full international debut for Congo on 12 August 2009 in a friendly match against Morocco.

== Honours ==
- 2008: Winner de la Coupe Gambardella
- 2007: Champion de France Under 18
