= Harestanes A.F.C. =

Association football club in East Dunbartonshire, Scotland

Harestanes
- Founded: 1981
- Ground: Merkland Park, Kirkintilloch
- Coordinates: 55°56′26″N 4°8′7″W
- League: Central Scottish AFL Premier Division
- 2018–19: Central Scottish AFL Premier Division, 5th of 12
Home colours

Harestanes Amateur Football Club are a Scottish amateur football club from the Harestanes area of Kirkintilloch, East Dunbartonshire. Formed in 1981, they play their home matches at the Merkland Playing Fields and their colours are red with yellow and navy trim.

Upon their formation in 1981 the club competed initially in a local Sunday football league, before transferring to Saturday football in the Stirling and District League in 1982. They won promotion in three consecutive seasons so that by the 1985–86 season they were in the First Division, which they won at the first time of asking. By 1989 they had switched from the Stirling and District League to the Central Scottish Amateur Football League, in which they still compete today.

In 1998 they won the Premier Division of the Central Scottish League for the first time, and have also won it on another four occasions, in 2000, 2001, 2003 and 2015. In 2002 they won the Scottish Amateur Cup at Hampden Park when they defeated Dumbarton Academy Former Pupils 4–2 in the final. They retained the trophy the following year, beating Newmilns Vesuvius 1–0 in the final, again at Hampden Park.

In 2015, Harestanes won the Scottish Amateur Cup for a third time, which under new rules introduced that year meant they became the first ever winners of the trophy to qualify for the senior Scottish Cup. They made their Scottish Cup debut in a preliminary round tie in August 2015, losing 3–0 to Girvan. The match was a home tie for Harestanes, but with Merklands being deemed unsuitable, it was played at Duncansfield Park, Kilsyth, in front of three hundred spectators.
