= Tommy Walker (footballer, born 1915) =

Scottish footballer (1915–1993)

Tommy Walker OBE
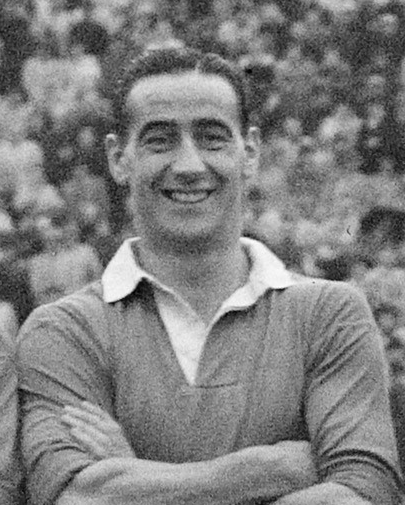
- Walker in a Chelsea team photo, 1947

Personal information
- Full name: Thomas Walker
- Date of birth: 26 May 1915
- Place of birth: Livingston, West Lothian, Scotland
- Date of death: 11 January 1993 (aged 77)
- Place of death: Edinburgh, Scotland
- Position: Inside forward

Youth career
- 1931–1932: Linlithgow Rose

Senior career*
Years	Team	Apps	(Gls)
1933–1946	Heart of Midlothian	235	(110)
1946–1948	Chelsea	97	(23)
1948	Heart of Midlothian	1	(0)

International career
1934–1939	Scotland	21	(9)
1935–1939	Scottish League XI	5	(2)
1939–1944	Scotland (wartime)	10	(1)

Managerial career
- 1951–1966: Heart of Midlothian
- 1967–1969: Raith Rovers
- * Club domestic league appearances and goals

Thomas Walker OBE (26 May 1915 – 11 January 1993) was a Scottish footballer, who played as an inside forward for Heart of Midlothian, Chelsea and the Scotland national team. He later managed Hearts and Raith Rovers before becoming a director of Hearts in his later years. Lauded for his Corinthian spirit and gentlemanly conduct, he is remembered as one of Hearts' all-time greats. Walker has been described as the most influential man ever to be associated with Heart of Midlothian.

== Playing career ==
=== Heart of Midlothian ===
Born in Livingston, West Lothian, Walker had originally harboured an ambition to become a Church of Scotland minister; however, his early footballing skills, which saw him recognised by Scotland at schoolboy level, ensured he was destined for a career on the pitch rather than in the pulpit. He played with local sides Berryburn Rangers, Livingston Violet and Broxburn Rangers before joining the Hearts ground staff aged 16 in February 1932. As Scottish clubs could not then officially sign players until the age of 17, Walker played junior football for Linlithgow Rose until his birthday in May.

A talented and elegant inside forward, Walker quickly earned a place in the Hearts first team, helping the side to victory in the 1933 Jubilee edition of the Rosebery Charity Cup, in a season in which they finished 3rd in the league. He was a regular first team player by 1933–34 but despite some emphatic victories, inconsistent form limited Hearts to a sixth-place finish.

In 1934–35, Arsenal expressed interest in signing Walker, and the potential £12,000 fee mooted would have been a world record. However, despite this interest and a later enquiry from Liverpool, Walker had by this stage become Hearts marquee player and the threat of a supporters boycott persuaded the Hearts board not to sell.

However, despite scoring 192 league goals for Hearts and playing in sides boasting numerous internationals, such as Scots Dave McCulloch, Barney Battles, Andy Anderson and Alex Massie, Welshman Freddie Warren and Irishman Willie Reid, Walker was destined not to win a major honour as a player at Tynecastle. The closest Hearts came to success during his period there was a second place league finish in 1937–38.

=== The Army and Chelsea ===
The outbreak of global hostilities in 1939 led to the cessation of League football in Scotland. Many footballers joined the armed forces, particularly in Edinburgh where few local industries were deemed suitable for reserved occupation status. Walker joined the Army as a sergeant in the Signals Regiment, and played for the famous Army footballing "All-Stars" team. At that time, he participated in Rovers Cup (one of the oldest club football tournaments) in India. Walker also guested for Chelsea, for whom he played several games, during the 1944–45 season. When the war ended, he joined Chelsea permanently The Blues paid Hearts £6,000 for his services in September 1946. Walker's arrival completed the club's impressive new forward line, which also included Tommy Lawton and Len Goulden. He made 103 appearances and scored 24 goals during his two and a half years in west London.

=== Scotland ===
Walker made his debut for Scotland against Wales in 1934, aged only 19, and he was to remain a regular in the side over the following five seasons. In November 1935 he scored his first international goal on familiar territory, helping Scotland defeat Ireland 2–1 at Tynecastle.

His most important performances for Scotland, and those which endeared him most to the Tartan Army, were against England at Wembley. In 1936, when trailing 1–0, Scotland were awarded a late penalty, which Walker volunteered to take. Twice the young inside forward spotted the ball and twice the swirling wind blew it from the penalty spot. On each occasion, Walker calmly returned the ball and, displaying nerves of steel, converted the penalty at the third attempt. He later recalled "I cannot even remember at what end of the ground the penalty-kick was given but I vaguely do remember the ball rolling off the spot. I just replaced it and hit it" . Two years later on 9 April 1938, Walker's 5th minute shot from just inside the penalty box was the only goal of the game against England, which also gave Walker the honour of being the first player to score a goal live on television.

Walker earned a total of 21 caps, during which he scored 9 goals. He scored in five consecutive games from April to December 1938. All but one of these caps were obtained before the age of 25 and had the Second World War not intervened, he would have garnered considerably more. If the ten caps he earned in wartime internationals were to count, he would have become the most capped Scottish player. He also won five Scottish League XI caps, scoring two goals.

== Managerial career ==
=== 1950s ===
In December 1948, Walker left Chelsea to return to Hearts as player-assistant to manager Davie McLean. McLean's intention was that Walker would be a steadying influence in a developing young team. However, after a single emergency appearance standing in at right-half for a regular player in a 1–0 home defeat by Dundee, Walker wisely retired to concentrate fully on learning the managerial ropes. Tangible progress was made in the League championship in 1949–50, when Hearts finished third. As Walker had become more influential, McLean was co-opted to the Hearts board of directors on 16 March 1950.

McLean's death on 14 February 1951 saw Walker promoted to the position of manager. Walker's reign was to prove the most successful period in the club's history. Walker was always quick to acknowledge the contribution made by McLean and his fatherly interest in the welfare and development of the players. The important foundations Walker inherited from McLean included the Terrible Trio forwards (Willie Bauld, Alfie Conn Sr. and Jimmy Wardhaugh), the full back pair of Bobby Parker and Tam McKenzie, and half backs Bobby Dougan and Davie Laing. To this established core John Cumming had recently broken through to the first team, first as a left winger and then in the left half position he was to dominate for many years. Freddie Glidden was already at Tynecastle but yet to first team debut, as was the then schoolboy Dave Mackay. Walker made Parker the team Captain.

Dave Mackay signed professional terms in 1952, initially part-time while also working as a joiner. The partnership of Mackay and Cumming at wing half was to become the nucleus of the team. Both went on to become full Scotland internationalists while playing for Hearts.

Bauld's value to the team was underlined in 1952/53, when he missed eight league games through ankle injuries. Hearts were struggling, but with Bauld's return to full fitness came a change in fortunes. From the bottom half of the league they surged up the table to finish in fourth place (as they had the two previous seasons). That resurgence also took them to a 1952–53 Scottish Cup semi final against Rangers before 116,262 fans at Hampden Park in Glasgow. Wardhaugh scored in the 2–1 defeat.

In 1953–54, Wardhaugh became the A Division's top scorer with 27 goals as Hearts appeared set to win the League championship. During a Scottish Cup quarter final 3–0 defeat away to Aberdeen on 13 March, Parker broke his jaw, Conn injured his back, and Wardhaugh collected a serious shin bone injury. Dougan already had a lengthy knee injury meaning 9 November 1953 was his last competitive Hearts first team game (Dougan only subsequently played for Hearts in friendlies). Walker immediately tried Glidden to cover and he took over the centre half berth from Dougan. A stuttering end to the season saw Celtic overtake Hearts.

The team was boosted by the signing of Ian Crawford in August 1954. Mackay was given a regular place in the team in the 1954–55 season, following the transfer of Laing to Clyde in September. It was from this point that Walker settled on Mackay, Glidden and Cumming as his combination for the number four, five and six jerseys. They promptly became a trophy winning force, lifting the first of seven trophies over nine seasons between 1954 and 1963. In October of the 1954–55 season Hearts won their first trophy since 1906, as they beat Motherwell 4–2 in the 1954 Scottish League Cup Final.

After signing Alex Young and Bobby Kirk, Walker's side proceeded to win the 1955–56 Scottish Cup. They thrashed Rangers 4–0 in the quarter finals with goals from Crawford, Conn and a Bauld double. Cumming's commitment to the team was typified in that 1956 Scottish Cup Final before 132,840 fans. With blood streaming from a first half head injury from a clash with Celtic's Willie Fernie he said, "Blood doesn't show on a maroon jersey". He returned to the playing field in the 3–1 win and was man of the match. Glidden lifted the trophy as Hearts captain in what he recalled as the "sweetest" moment in his footballing career.

Wardhaugh was the top tier's leading scorer again that season. The scorers in the cup final win over Celtic were Crawford with two and one from Conn. Conn ended that 1955–56 season at the peak of his powers aged 29 with a career best 29 goals from 41 games. On 2 May 1956 two weeks after the cup win Conn became the third of the terrible trio to collect a full Scotland cap. At Hampden Park he put his side ahead after 12 minutes in a 1–1 draw with Austria. However the following September he suffered a broken jaw playing against Hibernian keeping him out til January. The days of the Terrible Trio as a combined force were nearing their end.

Hearts led the Scottish League for most of the 1956–57 season. The title hinged on Rangers visit to Tynecastle on 13 April. A capacity crowd watched a tense game in which Rangers keeper, George Niven, was man of the match. Hearts could not beat him and the only goal came from Billy Simpson of Rangers who scored on the break in 35 minutes. Rangers had games in hand which they won to overtake Hearts and lift the trophy.

Walker completed the set of having won all three major Scottish football trophies with the League championship in 1957–58. A new Hearts attacking trio were dominant. For a third time Wardhaugh was the League's top marksman with 28 strikes. This was one ahead of Jimmy Murray's 27 and four more than Alex Young's 24. Mackay, now Captain, was fourth in Hearts' league scoring charts with 12. Hearts won that League title in 1957–58 with record-breaking points, goals scored and goal difference. Their record from 34 league games of 62 points out of a maximum possible 68 was 13 more than their nearest rival. They scored 132 goals (still the Scottish top tier record) with only 29 against for a record net difference of +103.

Hearts won the 1958–59 Scottish League Cup, eliminating Rangers in the group stage and winning the final 5–1 against Partick Thistle. Hearts defended their league title by being leaders in mid December. However a side visiting Ibrox missing injured Mackay were beaten 5–0 with all goals in the first 35 minutes. This moved Rangers into top position in the table on goal average. This precipitated a poor run of only two wins from the next seven games. Mackay left for £32,000 the following March for Tottenham Hotspur. Hearts fought back into contention and a 2–0 defeat of Rangers in April gave them a chance with two games remaining. The last day of the season began with Rangers two points clear and needing a point to clinch the title. Rangers lost 2–1 at home to Aberdeen, but Hearts also lost by the same score.

=== 1960s ===
After winning three Scottish championships and 19 full Scotland caps with Hibernian, Gordon Smith had a recurring ankle injury which led to his being given a free transfer in 1959. Smith believed that an operation could cure the injury and paid for an operation on the offending ankle himself. Walker then signed Smith for Hearts, who had been his boyhood heroes. Smith enjoyed immediate success at Tynecastle, winning both the 1959 Scottish League Cup Final and league title in the 1959–60 season. Hamilton scored for Hearts in that second successive League Cup Final and Young hit the winner, as Third Lanark were beaten 2–1. 1960 ended with Walker being awarded the OBE for his services to football.

The 1960s saw Hearts fortunes fluctuate as Walker attempted to adapt to football's tactical changes by implementing a 4–2–4 formation. Young and Thomson departed for Everton in November 1960. At Everton Young was known as The Golden Vision and became another from the Walker production line of full Scotland internationalists. Smith had an injury hit season leading to his joining Dundee (who became the third club with whom he won the Scottish title). Hearts signed further future full internationalists in Willie Wallace and David Holt. Hearts lost the 1961 Scottish League Cup Final after a replay. Cumming scored a deserved equalising penalty for Hearts in the first game 1–1 draw they largely dominated against the Scot Symon managed Rangers. Norrie Davidson scored a then equalising Hearts goal when they went down poorly in the 3–1 replay defeat.

Bauld left Hearts in 1962 with 355 goals from 510 first team appearances. Another future internationalist, Willie Hamilton, joined for the run culminating in the 1962 Scottish League Cup Final win. Hearts won the trophy for a fourth time with a 1–0 final win over Willie Waddell's fine Kilmarnock side of that era. Davidson's goal this time proved decisive. Like in the 1954–55 win Hearts eliminated Celtic in that 1962–63 Scottish League Cup group stage.

In 1964–65 Hearts fought out a championship title race with Waddell's Kilmarnock. In the era of two points for a win Hearts were three points clear with two games remaining. Hearts drew with Dundee United meaning the last game of the season with the two title challengers playing each other at Tynecastle would be a league decider. Kilmarnock needed to win by a two-goal margin to take the title. Hearts entered the game as favourites with both a statistical and home advantage. They also had a solid pedigree of trophy winning under Walker. Waddell's Kilmarnock in contrast had been nearly men. Four times in the previous five seasons they had finished league runners-up, including Hearts' triumph in 1960. Killie had also lost three domestic cup finals during the same period including the 1962 League Cup Final defeat to Hearts. Hearts had won five of the six senior cup finals they played in under Walker. Even the final they had lost was in a replay after drawing the first game.

Hearts' Roald Jensen hit the post after six minutes. Kilmarnock then scored twice through Davie Sneddon and Brian McIlroy after 27 and 29 minutes. Alan Gordon had an excellent chance to clinch the title for Hearts in second half injury time but was denied by a Bobby Ferguson diving save pushing the ball past the post. The 2–0 defeat meant Hearts lost the title by an average of 0.042 goals. Subsequently, Hearts were instrumental in pushing through a change to use goal difference to separate teams level on points. Ironically this rule change later denied Hearts the title in 1985–86.

Following a slump in results, Walker resigned in September 1966. Under his management Hearts had won 7 senior trophies and been runners up in five others. Cumming left the playing staff a year later and joined the coaching team.

== Later years ==
Walker returned to Hearts in 1974, their centenary year, assuming a position on the board. The Maroons were struggling to match the standards set by the teams Walker played in and managed, and it was hoped his appointment would prove a fillip. However, the club's troubles were ingrained, and by the time Walker retired in 1980, they had experienced relegation for the first time in their history.

Walker stayed in Edinburgh in his later years and took a close interest in Hearts mid-1980s revival. He died at the age of 77, following a short illness, in 1993.

== Career statistics ==
Appearances and goals by national team and year
National team	Year	Apps	Goals
Scotland	1934	1	0
Scotland	1935	3	1
Scotland	1936	4	2
Scotland	1937	6	0
Scotland	1938	5	6
Scotland	1939	1	0
Scotland	1946	1	0
Total		21	9

Scores and results list Scotland's goal tally first, score column indicates score after each Walker goal.

List of international goals scored by Tommy Walker
No.	Date	Venue	Opponent	Score	Result	Competition	Ref.
1	13 November 1935	Tynecastle Park, Edinburgh, Scotland	Ireland	1–1	2–1	1935–36 British Home Championship	
2	4 April 1936	Wembley Stadium, London, England	England	1–1	1–1	1935–36 British Home Championship	
3	2 December 1936	Dens Park, Dundee, Scotland	Wales	1–1	1–2	1936–37 British Home Championship	
4	9 April 1938	Wembley Stadium, London, England	England	1–0	1–0	1937–38 British Home Championship	
5	21 May 1938	Olympisch Stadium, Amsterdam, Netherlands	Netherlands	3–0	3–1	Friendly	
6	8 October 1938	Windsor Park, Belfast, Northern Ireland	Ireland	2–0	2–0	1938–39 British Home Championship	
7	9 November 1938	Tynecastle Park, Edinburgh, Scotland	Wales	2–1	3–2	1938–39 British Home Championship	
8	9 November 1938	Tynecastle Park, Edinburgh, Scotland	Wales	3–1	3–2	1938–39 British Home Championship	
9	7 December 1938	Ibrox Park, Glasgow, Scotland	Hungary	1–0	3–1	Friendly match	

== Honours ==
=== As manager ===
Heart of Midlothian

- Scottish League Championship: 1957–58, 1959–60
- Scottish Cup: 1955–56
- Scottish League Cup: 1954–55, 1958–59, 1959–60, 1962–63
