= 1954 Scottish League Cup final =

- Event: 1954–55 Scottish League Cup
Heart of Midlothian	Motherwell
4	2
- Date: 23 October 1954
- Venue: Hampden Park, Glasgow
- Attendance: 55,640

The 1954 Scottish League Cup final was played on 23 October 1954, at Hampden Park in Glasgow and was the final of the 9th Scottish League Cup competition. The final was contested by Heart of Midlothian and Motherwell. Hearts won the match 4–2, mainly thanks to a hat-trick by Willie Bauld.

== Match details ==
23 October 1954

Heart of Midlothian	4–2	Motherwell
Bauld; Wardhaugh		Bain; Redpath

Hampden Park, Glasgow
Attendance: 55,640
Referee: Jack Mowat

HEARTS :
GK	Willie Duff
FB	Bobby Parker (c)
FB	Tam McKenzie
RH	Dave Mackay
CH	Freddie Glidden
LH	John Cumming
RW	Jim Souness
IF	Alfie Conn
CF	Willie Bauld
IF	Jimmy Wardhaugh
LW	Johnny Urquhart
Manager:
Tommy Walker

MOTHERWELL :
GK	Hastie Weir
FB	Willie Kilmarnock (c)
FB	Willie McSeveney
RH	Charlie Cox
CH	Andy Paton
LH	Willie Redpath
RW	Jackie Hunter
IF	Charlie Aitken
CF	Alex Bain
IF	Wilson Humphries
LW	Archie Williams
Manager:
George Stevenson
