= David McLean (footballer, born 1884) =

Scottish footballer and manager

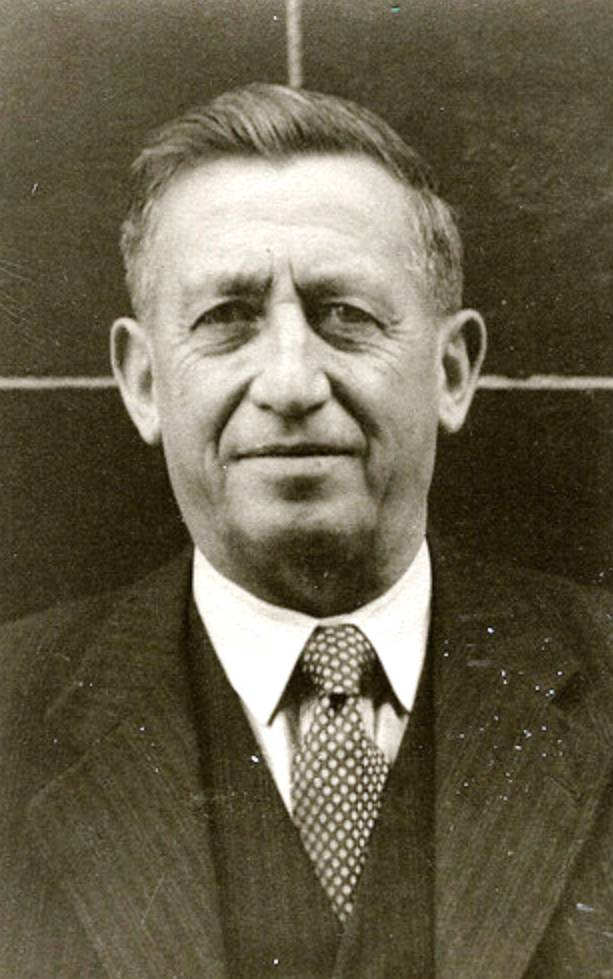

David McLean (3 February 1884 – 14 February 1951) was a Scottish footballer and manager. McLean played as a Winger.

== Playing career ==
McLean was born in Buckhaven, Fife. He played for Buckhaven United, Cambuslang Rangers, Celtic, Ayr United and Cowdenbeath. He first joined East Fife in 1911 as player-manager.

== Coaching career ==
=== East Fife and Bristol Rovers ===
After joining East Fife as player manager he led them to victory in the Scottish Qualifying Cup Final in 1920-21. East Fife were admitted to the Scottish Football League in 1921 and reached the 1927 Scottish Cup Final.

McLean was appointed manager of Bristol Rovers in 1929. He left after just over a year.

He and returned to East Fife in 1931. McLean led them to victory over Kilmarnock in the 1938 Scottish Cup Final.

=== Heart of Midlothian ===
Hearts appointed McLean manager on a five-year contract in June 1941. He played a significant role in rebuilding the club during the Second World War.

The first seeds of the Tommy Walker managerial success at Hearts were sown by McLean. On 9 October 1948, after a mediocre start to the 1948–49 season McLean combined three young forwards, Jimmy Wardhaugh, Willie Bauld and Alfie Conn Sr., for the first time. They became dubbed the Terrible Trio and scored over 900 Hearts goals between them (Wardhaugh 376, Bauld 355, Conn 221).

A few weeks later in December 1948, Tommy Walker left during his third season at Chelsea to return to Hearts. He took the role of player-assistant to McLean, whose intention was that Walker would be a steadying influence in a developing young team. However, after a single appearance at right-half in a 1–0 home defeat by Dundee, Walker retired to concentrate fully on learning the managerial ropes. Tangible progress was made in the League Championship in 1949-50 when Hearts finished third. As Walker had become more influential, McLean was co-opted to the board on 16 March 1950.

McLean's death on 14 February 1951 saw Walker promoted to the position of manager; his reign was to prove the most successful period in the club's history. Walker was always quick to acknowledge the contribution made by McLean and his fatherly interest in the welfare and development of the players. The important foundations Walker inherited from McLean included the Terrible Trio forwards, the full back pair of Bobby Parker and Tam McKenzie and half backs Bobby Dougan and Davie Laing.
