= Bobby Dougan =

Scottish footballer

Personal information
- Date of birth: 3 December 1926
- Place of birth: Glasgow, Scotland
- Date of death: 7 February 2010 (aged 83)
- Position: Centre half

Youth career
- Shawfield

Senior career*
Years	Team	Apps	(Gls)
1947–1954	Heart of Midlothian	125	(0)
1954–1960	Kilmarnock	61	(0)
Total		186	(0)

International career
1950–1953	Scottish League XI	3	(0)
1950	Scotland	1	(0)
- * Club domestic league appearances and goals

Bobby Dougan (3 December 1926 – 7 February 2010) was a Scottish footballer, who played as a centre half for Heart of Midlothian and Kilmarnock in the Scottish Football League, having started his career with Shawfield.

== Playing career ==
Dougan was raised in the Bridgeton district of Glasgow, attended John Street Secondary School and studied as a draughtsman with local engineering firm Sir William Arrol & Co. while beginning his playing career at Junior grade with Shawfield. He served in the Royal Navy during World War II.

In summer 1947, having just won the Scottish Junior Cup and been selected for Scotland at that level, he was brought to Heart of Midlothian by manager David McLean, establishing himself in the team alongside fellow post-war signings, Bobby Parker, Davie Laing, Jimmy Wardhaugh and Willie Bauld, the latter two forming the Terrible Trio front line at Tynecastle with Alfie Conn.

Dougan was selected once by the Scotland national football team, for a friendly match against Switzerland in 1950, with Willie Woodburn or George Young normally selected ahead of him. He also played three times for the Scottish Football League picking up a serious ankle injury in the second of those games in September 1951, which kept him out of the game for almost a year.

He picked up a second serious injury in November 1953 this time to his knee. The friendly away to Doncaster Rovers on 9 November 1953 was to be his last as a Hearts first team regular. Freddie Glidden had covered for Dougan at centre half and took over the position. Dougan waited over five months before appearing for the first team again. He only played again for Hearts in friendlies after the serious knee injury appeared. In December 1954, just over a year after injuring his knee, he was allowed to join Kilmarnock for a reported fee of £4 300. Dougan had played 125 league games and made 168 first team appearances for Hearts, departing just before their very successful period of the late 1950s began.

He was active for Kilmarnock over five seasons, making a total of 80 appearances but missing out on a place in the team for the 1957 Scottish Cup Final to Willie Toner; he remained on the staff at Rugby Park for two further years until 1962 to provide support to the management teams of Malky MacDonald and Willie Waddell.

He died in February 2010, aged 83, having suffered from Alzheimer's disease in later life.
