= Freddie Glidden =

Scottish footballer (1927–2019)

Personal information
- Full name: Frederick Glidden
- Date of birth: 7 September 1927
- Place of birth: Newmains, Scotland
- Date of death: 1 January 2019 (aged 91)
- Height: 5 ft 11 in (1.80 m)
- Position: Defender

Youth career
- Murrayfield Rovers
- West Calder Juveniles

Senior career*
Years	Team	Apps	(Gls)
1945–1946	Whitburn Juniors		
1946–1959	Heart of Midlothian	165	(2)
1946–1948	→ Newtongrange Star (loan)		
1959–1962	Dumbarton	97	(0)
- * Club domestic league appearances and goals

Frederick Glidden (7 September 1927 – 1 January 2019) was a Scottish professional footballer who spent most of his career with Heart of Midlothian.

== Career ==
=== Early years ===
Raised in Stoneyburn, Glidden played for several different juvenile sides as a forward before moving to a half-back role upon joining junior side Whitburn. He earned selection for the Scottish junior international team in that role and eventually the chance to sign for a professional League side.

=== Hearts ===
He signed provisionally for Hearts in 1946 but spent two years farmed out to local junior side Newtongrange Star, where he played alongside future Hearts teammate Willie Bauld.

After returning to Hearts in 1948 and playing several seasons of reserve-team football, Glidden made his debut in November 1951 against Queen of the South. Although he played as a right-back on that occasion, it was as right-half that he gained a regular role in the first team later that season. In 1954 Hearts' Bobby Dougan sustained the second serious injury of his career and required a cartlidge operation. After covering for Dougan during his enforced lengthy absence, Glidden took over the position on a permanent basis. He was part of the side that ended Hearts 48-year trophy drought by winning the 1954-55 League Cup and captained the team to Scottish Cup victory in 1955-56, a moment he recalls as the "sweetest" in his footballing career.

Glidden completed his set of domestic medals as Hearts won the League title for the first time since 1897 in the 1957-58 season but a recurring back injury during the following season limited his appearances and eventually led to his departure from Tynecastle.

=== Dumbarton ===
He joined Dumbarton in 1959 and played three seasons for the Second Division club before retiring in 1962.

== Away from playing ==
Throughout his playing career Glidden had been registered on a part-time contract, simultaneously working in the West Lothian County Water Department. He later worked as a sub-postmaster in Edinburgh. He continued to follow former side Hearts and was a regular spectator at their home games for many years.

== Death ==
Glidden died on 1 January 2019, at the age of 91.

== Honours ==
Heart of Midlothian

- Scottish League: 1957–58
- Scottish Cup: 1955–56
- Scottish League Cup (2): 1954–55, 1958–59
