= Alfie Conn =

Alfie Conn may refer to:

- Alfie Conn Sr., Scottish international footballer, most famous for his time with Heart of Midlothian, played 1944–1960
- Alfie Conn Jr., his son, also a Scottish international footballer, whose former teams include Rangers, Tottenham Hotspur and Celtic, played 1968–1983
