= Shawfield Amateurs F.C. =

Former association football club in Scotland

Coordinates: 55.832321°N 4.216933°W

Shawfield Amateurs
- Full name: Shawfield Amateurs F.C.
- Founded: 1935
- Dissolved: 1964
- Ground: Quay Road, Rutherglen
Home colours

Shawfield Amateurs Football Club were a Scottish football team located in the town of Rutherglen that competed in the Scottish Amateur Football League, and also the Scottish Cup in the 1940s and 1950s.

== Scottish Cup ==
Shawfield Amateurs appears to have been a works team associated with the large J & J White chemical processing plant in the Shawfield district of Rutherglen. They came to prominence in the 1930s and won the Third Division of the Scottish Amateur Football League in 1935–36, followed by the Second Division in 1936–37. For most of their history they played in blue. Another local team, Clyde Paper – based at a paper mill in the Farme Cross district – were also fairly successful in the amateur league in the same period.

The club participated in the 1st round proper of the Scottish Cup on four occasions, in 1947–48, 1954–55, 1955–56 and 1956–57. The club was placed in the short-lived Midlands section of the Scottish Qualifying Cup in 1947–48 and by reaching the last four the club qualified for the Scottish Cup proper, losing 8–0 at St Mirren F.C. in the first round. The club's 1950s appearances were at a time when the Scottish Qualifying Cup was temporarily not held, thus making it easier to appear in the main cup.

The club appears to have disbanded after the 1963–64 season, around the same time the works ceased operating.

== Ground ==
The address of the ground was given as Quay Road in Rutherglen. The pitch and other facilities formed part of the recreational provision provided by the works. Incidentally, the 1955 Scottish Cup competition in which the Amateurs competed was won by Clyde F.C., whose ground Shawfield Stadium was just a few hundred yards away.

== Colours ==
The club played in red shirts.
