= Archie Williams (footballer) =

Scottish footballer (1927–1985)

Archie Williams (13 May 1927 – 29 September 1985) was a Scottish football player, who played for Hearts, Motherwell and Dunfermline.
