= Tom Purdie =

Scottish footballer

Personal information
- Full name: Thomas Haig Purdie
- Date of birth: 1854
- Place of birth: Edinburgh, Scotland
- Date of death: 27 December 1929 (aged 75)
- Place of death: Edinburgh, Scotland
- Position: Full back

Senior career*
Years	Team	Apps	(Gls)
1874–1881	Heart of Midlothian	61	(1)
- * Club domestic league appearances and goals

Thomas Haig Purdie (1854 – 27 December 1929) was a Scottish football fullback who played for Heart of Midlothian.

== Hearts ==
Purdie played for Hearts between 1874 and 1881 and made 61 appearances for the club.

He was one of the founders of Heart of Midlothian. He was also the first ever captain of Hearts.

== Death ==
Tom Purdie died in a nursing home in Davidson's Mains, Edinburgh on 27 December 1929.
