= Davie Laing =

Scottish footballer

Personal information
- Date of birth: 20 February 1925
- Place of birth: Strathmiglo, Scotland
- Date of death: 15 July 2017 (aged 92)
- Height: 5 ft 9 in (1.75 m)
- Position: Wing half

Youth career
- Bayview YC

Senior career*
Years	Team	Apps	(Gls)
1946–1954	Heart of Midlothian	191	(11)
1954–1956	Clyde	43	(4)
1956–1957	Hibernian	6	(0)
1957–1959	Gillingham	82	(5)
1959–1961	Margate	79	(8)
1961–1962	Ramsgate Athletic		
1962–1963	Canterbury City	20	(0)
1963–1965	Margate	4	(0)
Total		322	(20)

International career
1952	Scottish League XI	3	(0)
- * Club domestic league appearances and goals

David Laing (20 February 1925 – 15 July 2017) was a Scottish professional footballer.

Laing played for Hearts for eight years and represented the Scottish League XI while there in 1952. His last game for the club was on 4 September 1954 in a 3–2 home victory against Celtic; He left Hearts a day later. His position in the team was given to Dave Mackay, who became a regular first team pick. Laing missed out as Hearts won their breakthrough trophy of the Tommy Walker era, the Scottish League Cup in 1954.

Laing though was to enjoy success of his own elsewhere, as he joined Clyde. He helped them win the 1955 Scottish Cup Final in his first season. Laing is generally accepted to have been man of the match in both the first game of the final and its replay.

He later played for Hibernian and Gillingham. He was inducted into the inaugural Clyde FC Hall of Fame in 2011. Laing died in July 2017, aged 92.
