= 1954–55 Scottish League Cup =

Tournament details
- Country: Scotland

Final positions
- Champions: Heart of Midlothian
- Runners-up: Motherwell

The 1954–55 Scottish League Cup was the ninth season of Scotland's second football knockout competition. The competition was won by Heart of Midlothian, who defeated Motherwell in the Final.

== First round ==
=== Group 1 ===
Team	Pld	W	D	L	GF	GA	GR	Pts
Motherwell	6	3	2	1	13	9	1.444	8
St Mirren	6	2	3	1	15	14	1.071	7
Kilmarnock	6	2	1	3	8	12	0.667	5
Raith Rovers	6	1	2	3	9	10	0.900	4

Home team	Score	Away team	Date
Kilmarnock	3–2	Raith Rovers	14 August 1954
St Mirren	4–4	Motherwell	14 August 1954
Motherwell	4–0	Kilmarnock	18 August 1954
Raith Rovers	2–2	St Mirren	18 August 1954
Kilmarnock	2–2	St Mirren	21 August 1954
Motherwell	1–1	Raith Rovers	21 August 1954
Motherwell	3–1	St Mirren	28 August 1954
Raith Rovers	0–1	Kilmarnock	28 August 1954
Kilmarnock	0–1	Motherwell	1 September 1954
St Mirren	3–1	Raith Rovers	1 September 1954
Raith Rovers	3–0	Motherwell	4 September 1954
St Mirren	3–2	Kilmarnock	4 September 1954

=== Group 2 ===
Team	Pld	W	D	L	GF	GA	GR	Pts
East Fife	6	4	0	2	13	11	1.182	8
Aberdeen	6	3	1	2	13	7	1.857	7
Hibernian	6	3	1	2	13	10	1.300	7
Queen of the South	6	1	0	5	8	19	0.421	2

Home team	Score	Away team	Date
Aberdeen	4–0	Queen of the South	14 August 1954
East Fife	3–1	Hibernian	14 August 1954
Hibernian	2–0	Aberdeen	18 August 1954
Queen of the South	1–4	East Fife	18 August 1954
East Fife	0–3	Aberdeen	21 August 1954
Hibernian	3–1	Queen of the South	21 August 1954
Hibernian	1–2	East Fife	28 August 1954
Queen of the South	3–0	Aberdeen	28 August 1954
Aberdeen	1–1	Hibernian	1 September 1954
East Fife	3–0	Queen of the South	1 September 1954
Aberdeen	5–1	East Fife	4 September 1954
Queen of the South	3–5	Hibernian	4 September 1954

=== Group 3 ===
Team	Pld	W	D	L	GF	GA	GR	Pts
Rangers	6	4	1	1	13	6	2.167	9
Partick Thistle	6	3	1	2	16	8	2.000	7
Clyde	6	2	0	4	10	10	1.000	4
Stirling Albion	6	2	0	4	5	20	0.250	4

Home team	Score	Away team	Date
Partick Thistle	3–2	Clyde	14 August 1954
Stirling Albion	0–5	Rangers	14 August 1954
Clyde	0–1	Stirling Albion	18 August 1954
Rangers	1–1	Partick Thistle	18 August 1954
Rangers	1–3	Clyde	21 August 1954
Stirling Albion	0–2	Partick Thistle	21 August 1954
Clyde	2–0	Partick Thistle	28 August 1954
Rangers	2–0	Stirling Albion	28 August 1954
Partick Thistle	1–2	Rangers	1 September 1954
Stirling Albion	3–2	Clyde	1 September 1954
Clyde	1–2	Rangers	4 September 1954
Partick Thistle	9–1	Stirling Albion	4 September 1954

=== Group 4 ===
Team	Pld	W	D	L	GF	GA	GR	Pts
Heart of Midlothian	6	5	0	1	19	11	1.727	10
Dundee	6	4	0	2	12	10	1.200	8
Celtic	6	1	1	4	9	11	0.818	3
Falkirk	6	1	1	4	10	18	0.556	3

Home team	Score	Away team	Date
Celtic	3–0	Falkirk	14 August 1954
Heart of Midlothian	3–1	Dundee	14 August 1954
Dundee	3–1	Celtic	18 August 1954
Falkirk	2–6	Heart of Midlothian	18 August 1954
Celtic	1–2	Heart of Midlothian	21 August 1954
Dundee	3–1	Falkirk	21 August 1954
Dundee	4–1	Heart of Midlothian	28 August 1954
Falkirk	2–2	Celtic	28 August 1954
Celtic	0–1	Dundee	1 September 1954
Heart of Midlothian	4–1	Falkirk	1 September 1954
Falkirk	4–0	Dundee	4 September 1954
Heart of Midlothian	3–2	Celtic	4 September 1954

=== Group 5 ===
Team	Pld	W	D	L	GF	GA	GR	Pts
St Johnstone	6	4	2	0	16	8	2.000	10
Hamilton Academical	6	2	2	2	11	10	1.100	6
Stenhousemuir	6	3	0	3	17	17	1.000	6
Forfar Athletic	6	0	2	4	10	19	0.526	2

Home team	Score	Away team	Date
Hamilton Academical	2–0	Forfar Athletic	14 August 1954
Stenhousemuir	2–4	St Johnstone	14 August 1954
Forfar Athletic	2–3	Stenhousemuir	18 August 1954
St Johnstone	2–0	Hamilton Academical	18 August 1954
St Johnstone	4–2	Forfar Athletic	21 August 1954
Stenhousemuir	4–3	Hamilton Academical	21 August 1954
Forfar Athletic	2–2	Hamilton Academical	28 August 1954
St Johnstone	3–1	Stenhousemuir	28 August 1954
Hamilton Academical	0–0	St Johnstone	1 September 1954
Stenhousemuir	5–1	Forfar Athletic	1 September 1954
Forfar Athletic	3–3	St Johnstone	4 September 1954
Hamilton Academical	4–2	Stenhousemuir	4 September 1954

=== Group 6 ===
Team	Pld	W	D	L	GF	GA	GR	Pts
Ayr United	6	4	1	1	17	12	1.417	9
Dunfermline Athletic	6	3	1	2	12	9	1.333	7
Brechin City	6	2	2	2	9	9	1.000	6
Dundee United	6	1	0	5	7	15	0.467	2

Home team	Score	Away team	Date
Brechin City	1–1	Dunfermline Athletic	14 August 1954
Dundee United	2–5	Ayr United	14 August 1954
Ayr United	2–2	Brechin City	18 August 1954
Dunfermline Athletic	3–1	Dundee United	18 August 1954
Brechin City	2–0	Dundee United	21 August 1954
Dunfermline Athletic	4–0	Ayr United	21 August 1954
Ayr United	3–1	Dundee United	28 August 1954
Dunfermline Athletic	2–1	Brechin City	28 August 1954
Brechin City	2–4	Ayr United	1 September 1954
Dundee United	3–1	Dunfermline Athletic	1 September 1954
Ayr United	3–1	Dunfermline Athletic	4 September 1954
Dundee United	0–1	Brechin City	4 September 1954

=== Group 7 ===
Team	Pld	W	D	L	GF	GA	GR	Pts
Airdrieonians	6	6	0	0	17	9	1.889	12
Third Lanark	6	3	0	3	9	6	1.500	6
Cowdenbeath	6	2	0	4	9	15	0.600	4
Queen's Park	6	1	0	5	14	19	0.737	2

Home team	Score	Away team	Date
Cowdenbeath	1–0	Third Lanark	14 August 1954
Queen's Park	2–4	Airdrieonians	14 August 1954
Airdrieonians	2–1	Cowdenbeath	18 August 1954
Third Lanark	2–0	Queen's Park	18 August 1954
Airdrieonians	2–0	Third Lanark	21 August 1954
Queen's Park	4–1	Cowdenbeath	21 August 1954
Airdrieonians	5–4	Queen's Park	28 August 1954
Third Lanark	4–0	Cowdenbeath	28 August 1954
Cowdenbeath	1–2	Airdrieonians	1 September 1954
Queen's Park	1–2	Third Lanark	1 September 1954
Cowdenbeath	5–3	Queen's Park	4 September 1954
Third Lanark	1–2	Airdrieonians	4 September 1954

=== Group 8 ===
Team	Pld	W	D	L	GF	GA	GR	Pts
Morton	6	3	1	2	13	6	2.167	7
Alloa Athletic	6	2	3	1	9	10	0.900	7
Albion Rovers	6	2	2	2	7	9	0.778	6
Arbroath	6	1	2	3	13	17	0.765	4

Home team	Score	Away team	Date
Albion Rovers	1–0	Morton	14 August 1954
Arbroath	2–3	Alloa Athletic	14 August 1954
Alloa Athletic	0–0	Albion Rovers	18 August 1954
Morton	5–2	Arbroath	18 August 1954
Arbroath	3–1	Albion Rovers	21 August 1954
Morton	3–0	Alloa Athletic	21 August 1954
Alloa Athletic	3–3	Arbroath	28 August 1954
Morton	3–0	Albion Rovers	28 August 1954
Albion Rovers	2–2	Alloa Athletic	1 September 1954
Arbroath	2–2	Morton	1 September 1954
Albion Rovers	3–1	Arbroath	4 September 1954
Alloa Athletic	1–0	Morton	4 September 1954

== Quarter-finals ==
=== First leg ===
Home team	Score	Away team	Date
Ayr United	2–1	Airdrieonians	22 September 1954
Morton	2–2	East Fife	22 September 1954
Motherwell	2–1	Rangers	22 September 1954
St Johnstone	0–5	Heart of Midlothian	22 September 1954

=== Second leg ===
Home team	Score	Away team	Date	Agg
Airdrieonians	6–1	Ayr United	25 September 1954	7–3
East Fife	2–0	Morton	25 September 1954	4–2
Heart of Midlothian	2–0	St Johnstone	25 September 1954	7–0
Rangers	1–1	Motherwell	25 September 1954	2–3

== Semi-finals ==
Home team	Score	Away team	Date
Heart of Midlothian	4–1	Airdrieonians	9 October 1954
Motherwell	2–1	East Fife	9 October 1954

== Final ==
23 October 1954

Heart of Midlothian	4–2	Motherwell
Bauld; Wardhaugh		Bain; Redpath

Hampden Park, Glasgow
Attendance: 55,640
Referee: Jack Mowat
