= 1955–56 Scottish Cup =

Tournament details
- Country: Scotland

Final positions
- Champions: Heart of Midlothian
- Runners-up: Celtic

The 1955–56 Scottish Cup was the 71st staging of Scotland's most prestigious football knockout competition. The Cup was won by Heart of Midlothian who defeated Celtic in the final. The final was a repeat of the 1907 final and was Hearts' first appearance in the final since that date.

== First round ==
Home team	Score	Away team
Whithorn	7 – 0	Vale of Leithen
Babcock & Wilcox	2 – 5	Clachnacuddin
Buckie Thistle	2 – 1	Rothes
Chirnside United	1 – 9	Elgin City
Duns	3 – 0	Deveronvale
Edinburgh University	0 – 7	Inverness Thistle
Eyemouth United	5 – 1	Brora Rangers
Forres Mechanics	3 – 2	Glasgow University
Fraserburgh	3 – 1	Aberdeen University
Gala Fairydean	2 – 1	Peterhead
Huntly	4 – 2	Civil Service Strollers
Lossiemouth	7 – 0	Wick Academy
Murrayfield Amateurs	2 – 2	Shawfield Amateurs
Nairn County	1 – 4	Inverness Caledonian
Newton Stewart	3 – 5	Peebles Rovers
Ross County	4 – 2	Coldstream
Selkirk	3 – 2	Burntisland Shipyard
St Cuthbert Wanderers	3 – 1	Vale of Atholl
Tarff Rovers	2 – 2	Girvan Amateurs
Wigtown & Bladnoch	0 – 7	Keith

=== Replays ===
Home team	Score	Away team
Girvan Amateurs	0 – 1	Tarff Rovers
Shawfield Amateurs	2 – 1	Murrayfield Amateurs

== Second round ==
Home team	Score	Away team
Peebles Rovers	4 – 3	Eyemouth United
Clachnacuddin	3 – 0	St Cuthbert Wanderers
Gala Fairydean	6 – 2	Shawfield Amateurs
Huntly	2 – 4	Forres Mechanics
Inverness Thistle	5 – 2	Buckie Thistle
Keith	2 – 0	Elgin City
Lossiemouth	3 – 1	Duns
Ross County	3 – 2	Tarff Rovers
Whithorn	2 – 3	Selkirk

== Third round ==
Home team	Score	Away team
Berwick Rangers	3 – 0	Fraserburgh
Dumbarton	5 – 3	Inverness Caledonian
Forres Mechanics	2 – 4	Clachnacuddin
Gala Fairydean	4 – 5	Montrose
Inverness Thistle	1 – 1	Peebles Rovers
Keith	2 – 4	East Stirlingshire
Lossiemouth	1 – 0	Selkirk
Ross County	2 – 3	Stranraer

=== Replays ===
Home team	Score	Away team
Peebles Rovers	2 – 1	Inverness Thistle

== Fourth round ==
Home team	Score	Away team
Albion Rovers	1 – 1	Alloa Athletic
Berwick Rangers	5 – 1	Lossiemouth
Brechin City	1 – 1	Peebles Rovers
Cowdenbeath	6 – 0	Montrose
Dundee United	4 – 1	Dumbarton
East Stirlingshire	0 – 2	Arbroath
Forfar Athletic	5 – 2	Stranraer
Greenock Morton	5 – 2	Clachnacuddin

=== Replays ===
Home team	Score	Away team
Alloa Athletic	4 – 0	Albion Rovers
Peebles Rovers	4 – 4	Brechin City

=== Second replays ===
Home team	Score	Away team
Peebles Rovers	0 – 0	Brechin City

=== Third replays ===
Home team	Score	Away team
Brechin City	6 – 2	Peebles Rovers

== Fifth round ==
Home team	Score	Away team
Airdrieonians	7 – 1	Hamilton Academical
Ayr United	5 – 2	Berwick Rangers
Brechin City	1 – 1	Arbroath
Clyde	5 – 0	Dunfermline Athletic
Dundee United	2 – 2	Dundee
East Fife	1 – 3	Stenhousemuir
Falkirk	0 – 3	Kilmarnock
Hearts	3 – 0	Forfar Athletic
Hibernian	1 – 1	Raith Rovers
Greenock Morton	0 – 2	Celtic
Motherwell	0 – 2	Queen's Park
Partick Thistle	2 – 0	Alloa Athletic
Queen of the South	3 – 1	Cowdenbeath
Rangers	2 – 1	Aberdeen
St Mirren	6 – 0	Third Lanark
Stirling Albion	2 – 1	St Johnstone

=== Replays ===
Home team	Score	Away team
Raith Rovers	3 – 1	Hibernian
Arbroath	2 – 3	Brechin City
Dundee	3 – 0	Dundee United

== Sixth round ==
Home team	Score	Away team
Airdrieonians	4 – 4	St Mirren
Ayr United	0 – 3	Celtic
Dundee	0 – 1	Rangers
Hearts	5 – 0	Stirling Albion
Kilmarnock	2 – 2	Queen of the South
Partick Thistle	3 – 1	Brechin City
Raith Rovers	2 – 2	Queen's Park
Stenhousemuir	0 – 1	Clyde

=== Replays ===
Home team	Score	Away team
Queen of the South	2 – 0	Kilmarnock
Queen's Park	1 – 2	Raith Rovers
St Mirren	1 – 3	Airdrieonians

== Quarter-finals ==
Home team	Score	Away team
Celtic	2 – 1	Airdrieonians
Hearts	4 – 0	Rangers
Queen of the South	2 – 4	Clyde
Raith Rovers	2 – 1	Partick Thistle

== Semi-finals ==
24 March 1956

Celtic	2–1	Clyde

Hampden Park, Glasgow

24 March 1956

Hearts	0–0	Raith Rovers

Easter Road, Edinburgh
Attendance: 58,448

=== Replay ===
28 March 1956

Hearts	3–0	Raith Rovers
Wardhaugh; Crawford

Easter Road, Edinburgh
Attendance: 54,233

== Final ==
21 April 1956

Hearts	3–1	Celtic
Crawford 20' 48'; Conn 80'	Report	Haughney 55'

Hampden Park, Glasgow
Attendance: 132,840
Referee: Bobby Davidson (Airdrie)

== See also ==
- 1955–56 in Scottish football
- 1955–56 Scottish League Cup
