= 1958–59 Scottish League Cup =

Tournament details
- Country: Scotland

Final positions
- Champions: Heart of Midlothian
- Runners-up: Partick Thistle

The 1958–59 Scottish League Cup was the thirteenth season of Scotland's second football knockout competition. The competition was won by Heart of Midlothian, who defeated Partick Thistle in the Final.

== First round ==
=== Group 1 ===
| Team | Pld | W | D | L | GF | GA | GR | Pts |
|---|---|---|---|---|---|---|---|---|
| Heart of Midlothian | 6 | 5 | 0 | 1 | 16 | 10 | 1.600 | 10 |
| Rangers | 6 | 3 | 1 | 2 | 16 | 7 | 2.286 | 7 |
| Raith Rovers | 6 | 2 | 0 | 4 | 10 | 18 | 0.556 | 4 |
| Third Lanark | 6 | 1 | 1 | 4 | 11 | 18 | 0.611 | 3 |

| Home team | Score | Away team | Date |
|---|---|---|---|
| Rangers | 3–0 | Heart of Midlothian | 9 August 1958 |
| Third Lanark | 4–2 | Raith Rovers | 9 August 1958 |
| Heart of Midlothian | 3–0 | Third Lanark | 13 August 1958 |
| Raith Rovers | 3–1 | Rangers | 13 August 1958 |
| Raith Rovers | 1–3 | Heart of Midlothian | 16 August 1958 |
| Rangers | 2–2 | Third Lanark | 16 August 1958 |
| Heart of Midlothian | 2–1 | Rangers | 23 August 1958 |
| Raith Rovers | 3–1 | Third Lanark | 23 August 1958 |
| Rangers | 6–0 | Raith Rovers | 27 August 1958 |
| Third Lanark | 4–5 | Heart of Midlothian | 27 August 1958 |
| Heart of Midlothian | 3–1 | Raith Rovers | 30 August 1958 |
| Third Lanark | 0–3 | Rangers | 30 August 1958 |

=== Group 2 ===
| Team | Pld | W | D | L | GF | GA | GR | Pts |
|---|---|---|---|---|---|---|---|---|
| Celtic | 6 | 4 | 1 | 1 | 17 | 11 | 1.545 | 9 |
| Clyde | 6 | 4 | 0 | 2 | 15 | 11 | 1.364 | 8 |
| St Mirren | 6 | 3 | 0 | 3 | 15 | 19 | 0.789 | 6 |
| Airdrieonians | 6 | 0 | 1 | 5 | 12 | 18 | 0.667 | 1 |

| Home team | Score | Away team | Date |
|---|---|---|---|
| Airdrieonians | 3–4 | St Mirren | 9 August 1958 |
| Clyde | 1–4 | Celtic | 9 August 1958 |
| Celtic | 3–3 | Airdrieonians | 13 August 1958 |
| St Mirren | 1–2 | Clyde | 13 August 1958 |
| Airdrieonians | 2–3 | Clyde | 16 August 1958 |
| Celtic | 3–0 | St Mirren | 16 August 1958 |
| Celtic | 2–0 | Clyde | 23 August 1958 |
| St Mirren | 3–2 | Airdrieonians | 23 August 1958 |
| Airdrieonians | 1–2 | Celtic | 27 August 1958 |
| Clyde | 6–1 | St Mirren | 27 August 1958 |
| Clyde | 3–1 | Airdrieonians | 30 August 1958 |
| St Mirren | 6–3 | Celtic | 30 August 1958 |

=== Group 3 ===
| Team | Pld | W | D | L | GF | GA | GR | Pts |
|---|---|---|---|---|---|---|---|---|
| Partick Thistle | 6 | 4 | 1 | 1 | 17 | 11 | 1.545 | 9 |
| Motherwell | 6 | 3 | 1 | 2 | 13 | 11 | 1.182 | 7 |
| Dundee | 6 | 2 | 0 | 4 | 10 | 11 | 0.909 | 4 |
| Queen of the South | 6 | 2 | 0 | 4 | 6 | 13 | 0.462 | 4 |

| Home team | Score | Away team | Date |
|---|---|---|---|
| Dundee | 2–3 | Partick Thistle | 9 August 1958 |
| Queen of the South | 1–2 | Motherwell | 9 August 1958 |
| Motherwell | 1–2 | Dundee | 13 August 1958 |
| Partick Thistle | 5–1 | Queen of the South | 13 August 1958 |
| Motherwell | 2–5 | Partick Thistle | 16 August 1958 |
| Queen of the South | 1–0 | Dundee | 16 August 1958 |
| Motherwell | 4–0 | Queen of the South | 23 August 1958 |
| Partick Thistle | 3–2 | Dundee | 23 August 1958 |
| Dundee | 2–3 | Motherwell | 27 August 1958 |
| Queen of the South | 3–0 | Partick Thistle | 27 August 1958 |
| Dundee | 2–0 | Queen of the South | 30 August 1958 |
| Partick Thistle | 1–1 | Motherwell | 30 August 1958 |

=== Group 4 ===
| Team | Pld | W | D | L | GF | GA | GR | Pts |
|---|---|---|---|---|---|---|---|---|
| Kilmarnock | 6 | 4 | 0 | 2 | 12 | 6 | 2.000 | 8 |
| Hibernian | 6 | 4 | 0 | 2 | 14 | 10 | 1.400 | 8 |
| Aberdeen | 6 | 2 | 1 | 3 | 11 | 11 | 1.000 | 5 |
| Falkirk | 6 | 1 | 1 | 4 | 7 | 17 | 0.412 | 3 |

| Home team | Score | Away team | Date |
|---|---|---|---|
| Hibernian | 3–2 | Falkirk | 9 August 1958 |
| Kilmarnock | 1–2 | Aberdeen | 9 August 1958 |
| Aberdeen | 1–2 | Hibernian | 13 August 1958 |
| Falkirk | 1–3 | Kilmarnock | 13 August 1958 |
| Aberdeen | 5–1 | Falkirk | 16 August 1958 |
| Hibernian | 0–3 | Kilmarnock | 16 August 1958 |
| Aberdeen | 0–2 | Kilmarnock | 23 August 1958 |
| Falkirk | 0–4 | Hibernian | 23 August 1958 |
| Hibernian | 4–2 | Aberdeen | 27 August 1958 |
| Kilmarnock | 1–2 | Falkirk | 27 August 1958 |
| Falkirk | 1–1 | Aberdeen | 30 August 1958 |
| Kilmarnock | 2–1 | Hibernian | 30 August 1958 |

=== Group 5 ===
| Team | Pld | W | D | L | GF | GA | GR | Pts |
|---|---|---|---|---|---|---|---|---|
| Dunfermline Athletic | 6 | 6 | 0 | 0 | 23 | 7 | 3.286 | 12 |
| East Fife | 6 | 3 | 0 | 3 | 16 | 12 | 1.333 | 6 |
| Stirling Albion | 6 | 3 | 0 | 3 | 13 | 18 | 0.722 | 6 |
| Brechin City | 6 | 0 | 0 | 6 | 7 | 22 | 0.318 | 0 |

| Home team | Score | Away team | Date |
|---|---|---|---|
| East Fife | 1–3 | Dunfermline Athletic | 9 August 1958 |
| Stirling Albion | 3–2 | Brechin City | 9 August 1958 |
| Brechin City | 0–3 | East Fife | 13 August 1958 |
| Dunfermline Athletic | 6–1 | Stirling Albion | 13 August 1958 |
| Dunfermline Athletic | 4–1 | Brechin City | 16 August 1958 |
| Stirling Albion | 1–0 | East Fife | 16 August 1958 |
| Brechin City | 2–5 | Stirling Albion | 23 August 1958 |
| Dunfermline Athletic | 5–2 | East Fife | 23 August 1958 |
| East Fife | 5–1 | Brechin City | 27 August 1958 |
| Stirling Albion | 1–3 | Dunfermline Athletic | 27 August 1958 |
| Brechin City | 1–2 | Dunfermline Athletic | 30 August 1958 |
| East Fife | 5–2 | Stirling Albion | 30 August 1958 |

=== Group 6 ===
| Team | Pld | W | D | L | GF | GA | GR | Pts |
|---|---|---|---|---|---|---|---|---|
| Cowdenbeath | 6 | 5 | 1 | 0 | 15 | 5 | 3.000 | 11 |
| Morton | 6 | 2 | 1 | 3 | 12 | 9 | 1.333 | 5 |
| St Johnstone | 6 | 2 | 0 | 4 | 11 | 12 | 0.917 | 4 |
| Dundee United | 6 | 2 | 0 | 4 | 11 | 23 | 0.478 | 4 |

| Home team | Score | Away team | Date |
|---|---|---|---|
| Cowdenbeath | 2–1 | Morton | 9 August 1958 |
| St Johnstone | 1–2 | Dundee United | 9 August 1958 |
| Dundee United | 1–3 | Cowdenbeath | 13 August 1958 |
| Morton | 1–3 | St Johnstone | 13 August 1958 |
| Dundee United | 1–4 | Morton | 16 August 1958 |
| St Johnstone | 1–2 | Cowdenbeath | 16 August 1958 |
| Dundee United | 5–3 | St Johnstone | 23 August 1958 |
| Morton | 0–0 | Cowdenbeath | 23 August 1958 |
| Cowdenbeath | 6–1 | Dundee United | 27 August 1958 |
| St Johnstone | 2–0 | Morton | 27 August 1958 |
| Cowdenbeath | 2–1 | St Johnstone | 30 August 1958 |
| Morton | 6–1 | Dundee United | 30 August 1958 |

=== Group 7 ===
| Team | Pld | W | D | L | GF | GA | GR | Pts |
|---|---|---|---|---|---|---|---|---|
| Arbroath | 6 | 5 | 0 | 1 | 20 | 8 | 2.500 | 10 |
| Dumbarton | 6 | 3 | 1 | 2 | 15 | 12 | 1.250 | 7 |
| Queen's Park | 6 | 2 | 2 | 2 | 12 | 15 | 0.800 | 6 |
| Alloa Athletic | 6 | 0 | 1 | 5 | 9 | 21 | 0.429 | 1 |

| Home team | Score | Away team | Date |
|---|---|---|---|
| Arbroath | 3–1 | Alloa Athletic | 9 August 1958 |
| Dumbarton | 3–3 | Queen's Park | 9 August 1958 |
| Alloa Athletic | 1–3 | Dumbarton | 13 August 1958 |
| Queen's Park | 2–1 | Arbroath | 13 August 1958 |
| Arbroath | 6–3 | Dumbarton | 16 August 1958 |
| Queen's Park | 5–2 | Alloa Athletic | 16 August 1958 |
| Alloa Athletic | 2–5 | Arbroath | 23 August 1958 |
| Queen's Park | 0–3 | Dumbarton | 23 August 1958 |
| Arbroath | 4–0 | Queen's Park | 27 August 1958 |
| Dumbarton | 3–1 | Alloa Athletic | 27 August 1958 |
| Alloa Athletic | 2–2 | Queen's Park | 30 August 1958 |
| Dumbarton | 0–1 | Arbroath | 30 August 1958 |

=== Group 8 ===
| Team | Pld | W | D | L | GF | GA | GR | Pts |
|---|---|---|---|---|---|---|---|---|
| Ayr United | 6 | 4 | 1 | 1 | 18 | 7 | 2.571 | 9 |
| Hamilton Academical | 6 | 4 | 0 | 2 | 12 | 7 | 1.714 | 8 |
| Forfar Athletic | 6 | 2 | 2 | 2 | 8 | 10 | 0.800 | 6 |
| Montrose | 6 | 0 | 1 | 5 | 7 | 21 | 0.333 | 1 |

| Home team | Score | Away team | Date |
|---|---|---|---|
| Hamilton Academical | 3–1 | Ayr United | 9 August 1958 |
| Montrose | 2–2 | Forfar Athletic | 9 August 1958 |
| Ayr United | 7–1 | Montrose | 13 August 1958 |
| Forfar Athletic | 1–0 | Hamilton Academical | 13 August 1958 |
| Ayr United | 4–0 | Forfar Athletic | 16 August 1958 |
| Montrose | 2–3 | Hamilton Academical | 16 August 1958 |
| Ayr United | 3–1 | Hamilton Academical | 23 August 1958 |
| Forfar Athletic | 4–1 | Montrose | 23 August 1958 |
| Hamilton Academical | 2–0 | Forfar Athletic | 27 August 1958 |
| Montrose | 1–2 | Ayr United | 27 August 1958 |
| Forfar Athletic | 1–1 | Ayr United | 30 August 1958 |
| Hamilton Academical | 3–0 | Montrose | 30 August 1958 |

=== Group 9 ===
| Team | Pld | W | D | L | GF | GA | GR | Pts |
|---|---|---|---|---|---|---|---|---|
| Stranraer | 4 | 4 | 0 | 0 | 12 | 6 | 2.000 | 8 |
| Berwick Rangers | 4 | 2 | 1 | 1 | 7 | 6 | 1.167 | 5 |
| Stenhousemuir | 4 | 2 | 0 | 2 | 12 | 5 | 2.400 | 4 |
| Albion Rovers | 4 | 1 | 1 | 2 | 7 | 11 | 0.636 | 3 |
| East Stirlingshire | 4 | 0 | 0 | 4 | 4 | 14 | 0.286 | 0 |

| Home team | Score | Away team | Date |
|---|---|---|---|
| East Stirlingshire | 0–5 | Stenhousemuir | 9 August 1958 |
| Stranraer | 4–1 | Albion Rovers | 9 August 1958 |
| Albion Rovers | 0–4 | Stenhousemuir | 13 August 1958 |
| Berwick Rangers | 3–2 | East Stirlingshire | 13 August 1958 |
| East Stirlingshire | 1–2 | Stranraer | 16 August 1958 |
| Stenhousemuir | 0–1 | Berwick Rangers | 16 August 1958 |
| Albion Rovers | 4–1 | East Stirlingshire | 23 August 1958 |
| Stranraer | 2–1 | Berwick Rangers | 23 August 1958 |
| Stenhousemuir | 3–4 | Stranraer | 27 August 1958 |
| Berwick Rangers | 2–2 | Albion Rovers | 30 August 1958 |

== Supplementary round ==
=== First leg ===
| Home team | Score | Away team | Date |
|---|---|---|---|
| Stranraer | 3–4 | Arbroath | 1 September 1958 |

=== Second leg ===
| Home team | Score | Away team | Date | Agg |
|---|---|---|---|---|
| Arbroath | 1–0 | Stranraer | 3 September 1958 | 5–3 |

== Quarter-finals ==
=== First leg ===
| Home team | Score | Away team | Date |
|---|---|---|---|
| Ayr United | 1–5 | Heart of Midlothian | 10 September 1958 |
| Celtic | 2–0 | Cowdenbeath | 10 September 1958 |
| Kilmarnock | 4–1 | Dunfermline Athletic | 10 September 1958 |
| Partick Thistle | 2–1 | Arbroath | 10 September 1958 |

=== Second leg ===
| Home team | Score | Away team | Date | Agg |
|---|---|---|---|---|
| Arbroath | 1–1 | Partick Thistle | 17 September 1958 | 2–3 |
| Cowdenbeath | 1–8 | Celtic | 17 September 1958 | 1–10 |
| Dunfermline Athletic | 3–3 | Kilmarnock | 16 September 1958 | 4–7 |
| Heart of Midlothian | 3–1 | Ayr United | 17 September 1958 | 8–2 |

== Semi-finals ==
| Home team | Score | Away team | Date |
|---|---|---|---|
| Heart of Midlothian | 3–0 | Kilmarnock | 1 October 1958 |
| Partick Thistle | 2–1 | Celtic | 1 October 1958 |

== Final ==
25 October 1958

| Heart of Midlothian | 5–1 | Partick Thistle |
|---|---|---|
| Bauld 5', 28'; Murray 10', 38'; Hamilton 60' | | Smith 46' |

Hampden Park, Glasgow
Attendance: 59,960
