= Heart of Midlothian F.C. =

Association football club in Edinburgh, Scotland

Heart of Midlothian
- Full name: Heart of Midlothian Football Club
- Nicknames: The Jam Tarts; The Jambos; The Gorgie Boys
- Short name: Hearts; HMFC
- Founded: 1874; 152 years ago
- Ground: Tynecastle Park, Edinburgh
- Capacity: 19,852
- Coordinates: 55°56′20″N 3°13′57″W
- Chairman: Calum Paterson
- Head coach: Wouter Vrancken
- League: Scottish Premiership
- 2025–26: Scottish Premiership, 2nd of 12
- Website: heartsfc.co.uk
Home colours	Away colours	Third colours

Heart of Midlothian Football Club, commonly known as Hearts, is a professional football club in Edinburgh, Scotland. The team competes in the Scottish Premiership, the top division of Scottish football. Hearts, the oldest football club in the Scottish capital, was formed in 1874, its name influenced by Walter Scott's novel The Heart of Midlothian (1818). The club crest is based on the Heart of Midlothian mosaic on the city's Royal Mile; the team's colours are maroon and white. Their local rivals are Hibernian, with whom they contest the Edinburgh derby.

Hearts have played home matches at Tynecastle Park since 1886. After the ground was converted into an all-seater stadium in 1994, it now has a capacity of 19,852 following the completion of a rebuilt main stand in 2017. They have training facilities at the Oriam, Scotland's national performance centre for sport, where they also run their youth academy.

Hearts have won the Scottish league championship four times, most recently in 1959–60, when they also retained the Scottish League Cup to complete a League and League Cup double – the only club outside of the Old Firm to achieve such a feat.

The club's most successful period was under former player turned manager Tommy Walker from the early 1950s to mid 1960s, during which they won two league titles and five major cups and finished inside the league's top four positions for 11 consecutive seasons. Jimmy Wardhaugh, Willie Bauld and Alfie Conn Sr., known as the Terrible Trio, were forwards at the start of this period with wing half linchpins Dave Mackay and John Cumming. Wardhaugh was part of another notable Hearts attacking trinity in the 1957–58 league winning side: along with Jimmy Murray and Alex Young, they set the record for the number of goals scored in a Scottish top-flight winning campaign (132) and also became the only side to finish a season in the Scottish top tier with a goal difference exceeding 100 (+103).

Hearts have won the Scottish Cup eight times, most recently in 2012 after a 5–1 victory over Hibernian. They have since been runners up in 2019, 2020 and 2022. All four of Hearts' Scottish League Cup triumphs came under Walker, most recently a 1–0 victory against Kilmarnock in 1962. Their most recent League Cup Final appearance was in 2013, where they lost 3–2 to St Mirren.

In 1958, Heart of Midlothian became the third Scottish and fifth British team to compete in European competition. The club reached the quarter-finals of the 1988–89 UEFA Cup, losing to Bayern Munich 2–1 on aggregate.

== History ==
=== Early years ===
The club was formed by a group of friends from the Heart of Midlothian Quadrille Assembly Club. The group of friends bought a ball before playing local rules football at the Tron from where they were directed by a local policeman to The Meadows to play. Local rules football was a mix of rugby and association football. In December 1873 a match was held between XIs selected by Mr Thomson from Queen's Park and Mr Gardner from Clydesdale at Raimes Park in Bonnington. This was the first time that association rules had been seen in Edinburgh. Members from the dance club viewed the match and in 1874 decided to adopt the Association rules. The new side was Heart of Mid-Lothian Football Club. The exact date of the club's formation was never recorded; however, 1874 is regarded as the year of formation as it was when association rules were taken on, although Tom Purdie claimed the club was formed in 1873. The earliest mention of "Heart of Midlothian" in a sporting context is a report in The Scotsman newspaper from 20 July 1864 of The Scotsman vs Heart of Mid-Lothian at cricket. It is not known if this was the same club who went on to form the football club, but it was common for football clubs in those days to play other sports as well.

The club took its name from historic county Midlothian, dating from the Middle Ages, as well as the 1860 Heart of Midlothian mosaic on the Royal Mile, which marks the historic entrance to the Old Tolbooth jail; the jail was demolished in 1817 but was kept fresh in the mind by Walter Scott's 1818 novel The Heart of Midlothian.

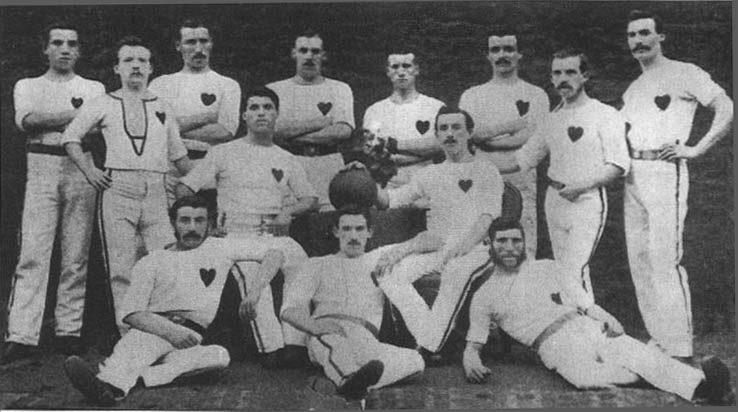
The 1875 Hearts team with the original white shirt

Led by captain Tom Purdie the club played its matches in the East Meadows and in 1875 Hearts became members of the Scottish Football Association (SFA) and were founder members of the Edinburgh Football Association. By becoming members of the SFA Hearts were able to play in the Scottish Cup for the first time. Hearts played against 3rd Edinburgh Rifle Volunteers F.C. in October 1875 at Craigmount Park in Edinburgh. The game ended in a scoreless draw. A replay was held at the Meadows which again finished 0–0. Under rules at the time both clubs progressed to the next round with Hearts losing out to Drumpellier in the next round.

In the 1884–85 season, clubs in Scotland struggled to attract quality players who preferred to play professionally in England. After an 11–1 win in the Scottish Cup over Dunfermline a protest was raised against the club for fielding two professional players, which was against the rules at the time. Hearts were suspended by the SFA for two years - the first ever suspension of an SFA club. They were readmitted after a change of the club's committee.

=== Early success ===
Hearts had considerable success in the early years of the Scottish Football League, winning the league championship in 1895 and 1896. They also won four Scottish Cups in a 15-year period from 1891 to 1906. The team played against Sunderland in the 1894–95 World Championship, but lost with a 5–3 score. Hearts did win the World Championship title in 1902, beating Tottenham Hotspur 3–1 in Tynecastle Park, after a 0–0 in London a few months earlier.

=== Hearts in World War I ===
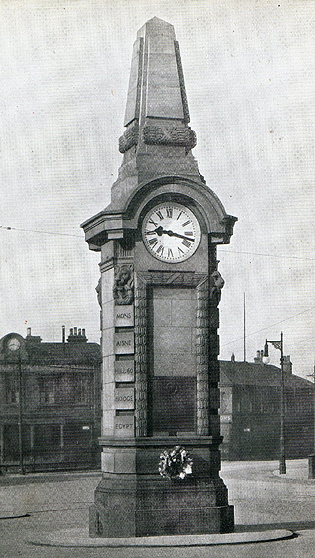
Hearts War Memorial

Do not ask where Hearts are playing and then look at me askance. If it's football that you're wanting, you must come with us to France!

— Sir George McCrae

In November 1914, Heart of Midlothian comfortably led the First Division, having started the 1914–15 season with eight straight victories, including a 2–0 defeat of reigning champions Celtic.

This streak coincided with the beginning of World War I and the start of a public debate upon the morality of continuing professional football while young soldiers were dying on the front-line. A motion was placed before the Scottish Football Association to postpone the season, with one of its backers, Airdrieonians chairman Thomas Forsyth declaring that "playing football while our men are fighting is repugnant". While this motion was defeated at the ballot box, with the SFA opting to wait for War Office advice, the East London philanthropist Frederick Nicholas Charrington was orchestrating a public campaign to have professional football in Britain suspended, and achieving great popular support for his cause. The prime tactic of Charrington's campaign was to shame football players and officials into action through public and private denouncement. In response, sixteen players from Hearts enlisted in Sir George McCrae's new volunteer battalion, joining en masse on 25 November 1914. The battalion was to become the 16th Royal Scots and was the first to earn the "footballer's battalion" sobriquet. The group of volunteers also contained some 500 Hearts supporters and ticket-holders, 150 followers of Hibernian and a number of professional footballers from Raith Rovers, Falkirk and Dunfermline.

Military training was thus added to the Hearts players football training regime, and the side had a 20-game unbeaten run between October and February. However, exhaustion from their army exertions, twice including 10-hour nocturnal-marches the night before a league game, eventually led to a drop in form, as several enlisted players missed key games. Defeats to St Mirren and Morton allowed Celtic to usurp the Maroons and eventually claim the league title by 4 points.

The war claimed the lives of seven first team players: Duncan Currie, John Allan, James Boyd, Tom Gracie, Ernest Ellis, James Speedie and Harry Wattie as well as former player David Philip.

There are two war memorials to mark this period; The McCrae's Battalion Great War Memorial in Contalmaison and the Heart of Midlothian War Memorial in Haymarket, Edinburgh donated to the city by the club in 1922. The latter was placed in storage due to the Edinburgh Trams work but has now been replaced a little to the east of its previous position. A further memorial commemorating the 1914 Hearts team has been proposed by the club. An annual pilgrimage is held by football supporters to Contalmaison every year, whilst Hearts hold their memorial services at Haymarket or, whilst it was in storage, at Tynecastle Park.

=== Inter war years ===
Hearts collected no senior silverware in the inter war years. Tommy Walker joined the Hearts ground staff aged 16 in February 1932. As Scottish clubs could not then officially sign players until the age of 17, Walker played junior football for Linlithgow Rose until his birthday in May. A talented and elegant inside-forward, Walker quickly earned a place in the Hearts first team, helping the side to victory in the 1933 Jubilee edition of the Rosebery Charity Cup, in a season in which they finished 3rd in the league. He was a regular first team player by 1933–34 but despite some emphatic victories, inconsistent form limited Hearts to a sixth-place finish.

Despite Walker scoring 192 league goals for Hearts and playing in sides boasting numerous internationals, such as Scots Dave McCulloch, Barney Battles, Andy Anderson and Alex Massie, Welshman Freddie Warren and Irishman Willie Reid, Walker was destined not to win a major honour as a player at Tynecastle. The closest Hearts came to success during his period there was a second place league finish in 1937–38.

=== Tommy Walker's managerial era ===
The first seeds of the Tommy Walker managerial success at Hearts were sown by Davie McLean. On 9 October 1948 after a mediocre start to the 1948–49 season, Hearts' manager McLean gave a competitive first team debut to 20 year old centre forward Willie Bauld and 19 year old inside left Jimmy Wardhaugh, and 22 year old inside right Alfie Conn Sr. had already broken through to the first team so this game marked the first time all three were deployed as a combined attacking force. They became dubbed the Terrible Trio and scored over 900 Hearts goals between them (Wardhaugh 376, Bauld 355, Conn 221). As a unit they played 242 games together. The combination of Wardhaugh's dribbling skills and non-stop running, Bauld's cerebral play and prodigious aerial ability, and Conn's energetic, tenacious style and powerful shooting complemented each other well. Their first match as a forward combination ended in a 6–1 defeat of Scot Symon's East Fife team of the era. This was notable as Symon's team had defeated the Maroons 4–0 three weeks earlier.

A few weeks later in December 1948 Tommy Walker left during his third season at Chelsea to return to Hearts. He took the role of player-assistant to manager McLean. McLean's intention was that Walker would be a steadying influence in a developing young team. However, after a single appearance at right-half in a 1–0 home defeat by Dundee, Walker retired to concentrate fully on learning the managerial ropes. Tangible progress was made in the League Championship in 1949–50 when Hearts finished third. As Tommy Walker had become more influential, McLean was co-opted to the Board on 16 March 1950.

Chart of Hearts' yearly table positions in the League.

McLean's death on 14 February 1951 saw Walker promoted to the position of manager. Walker's reign was to prove the most successful period in the club's history. Walker was always quick to acknowledge the contribution made by McLean and his fatherly interest in the welfare and development of the players. The important foundations Walker inherited from McLean included the Terrible Trio forwards, the full back pair of Bobby Parker and Tam McKenzie and half backs Bobby Dougan and Davie Laing. To this established core John Cumming had recently broken through to the first team in the left half position he was to dominate for many years. Freddie Glidden was already at Tynecastle but yet to first team debut as was the then schoolboy Dave Mackay. Walker made Parker the team captain.

Mackay's key signing as a professional was under Walker in 1952 (initially part-time whilst also working as a joiner). Mackay's pairing with Cumming at wing half was to become the nucleus of the team in the middle of the pitch. Mackay was a supremely talented all round player of ferocious tackling, endless running and sublime ball control. Cumming's Iron Man nickname says much of his fearless determination. Despite his commitment he retained control of his temper and was never booked in his career. Cumming was the only player to collect medals for all seven of the trophies Hearts won under Walker. "He never had a bad game. It was either a fairly good game or an excellent game," said Mackay later of his former teammate. Both went on to become full Scotland internationalists while playing for Hearts.

Bauld's value to the team was underlined in 1952–53, when he missed eight vital league games through ankle injuries. Hearts were struggling, but with Bauld's return to full fitness came a change in fortunes. From the bottom half of the league they surged up the table to finish in fourth place (as they had the two previous seasons). That resurgence also took them to a 1952–53 Scottish Cup semi final against Rangers before 116,262 fans at Hampden Park in Glasgow. Wardhaugh scored in the 2–1 defeat. Hearts were now though on an upward trajectory.

In 1953–54, Wardhaugh became the A Division's top scorer with 27 goals as Hearts appeared set to win the League championship. However, on 13 March 1954 in the Scottish Cup quarter final 3–0 defeat away to Aberdeen, Parker broke his jaw, Conn injured his back, and Wardhaugh collected a serious shin bone injury. Dougan already had a lengthy knee injury meaning 9 November 1953 was his last competitive Hearts first team game (Dougan only subsequently played for Hearts in friendlies). Walker immediately tried Glidden to cover and he took over the centre half berth from Dougan. A stuttering end to their season saw Celtic overtake them. The young Mackay was given his first team debut on 7 November of that 1953–54 season one week before his nineteenth birthday. Naturally more left sided than right, Mackay played in the number six jersey normally associated with the absent Cumming. Mackay's next two appearances though weren't until mid March immediately after the Aberdeen cup defeat when again he played in Cumming's position. It wasn't until 17 April 1954 in a 1–0 win at Clyde that Walker first selected Mackay, Glidden and Cumming in the numbers four, five and six.

The team was boosted by the signing of Ian Crawford in August 1954. Mackay was given his extended place in the team in the 1954–55 season immediately after Laing's 5 September transfer to Clyde. It was from this point that Walker settled on Mackay, Glidden and Cumming as his combination for the number four, five and six jerseys. They promptly became a trophy winning force lifting the first of seven trophies over nine seasons between 1954 and 1963. In October of the 1954–55 season they won their first trophy since 1906, 48 years before. They beat Motherwell 4–2 in the 1954 Scottish League Cup final. Bauld scored three and Wardhaugh scored one in the final giving the team their break through trophy. Hearts gained some recompense against Celtic from the season before by beating them home and away in that 1954–55 Scottish League Cup group stage.

After signing Alex Young and Bobby Kirk, Walker's side proceeded to win the 1955–56 Scottish Cup. They thrashed Rangers 4–0 in the quarter-finals with goals from Crawford, Conn and a Bauld double. Cumming's commitment to the team was typified in that 1956 Scottish Cup final before 132,840 fans. With blood streaming from a first half head injury from a clash with Celtic's Willie Fernie he said, "Blood doesn't show on a maroon jersey". He returned to the playing field in the 3–1 win and was man of the match. That quote is now displayed above the entrance to the players tunnel at Tynecastle. Kirk could play in either full back role and played on the right in the final at the expense of Parker. Glidden lifted the trophy as Hearts captain in what he recalled as the "sweetest" moment in his footballing career.

Wardhaugh was the top tier's leading scorer again that season. The scorers in the cup final win over Celtic were Crawford with two and one from Conn. Conn ended that 1955–56 season at the peak of his powers aged 29 with a career best 29 goals from 41 games. On 2 May 1956 two weeks after the cup win Conn became the third of the terrible trio to collect a full Scotland cap. At Hampden Park he put his side ahead after 12 minutes in a 1–1 draw with Austria. However the following September he suffered a broken jaw playing against Hibernian keeping him out until January. The days of the Terrible Trio as a combined force were nearing their end.

17 year old Gordon Marshall debuted in 1956 as did George Thomson in February 1957. Marshall, a future England under-23 internationalist, became a Hearts goalkeeping regular until 1963. Hearts led the Scottish League for most of the 1956–57 season. The title hinged on Rangers visit to Tynecastle on 13 April. A capacity crowd watched a tense game in which Rangers keeper, George Niven, was man of the match. Hearts could not beat him and the only goal came from Billy Simpson of Rangers who scored on the break in 35 minutes. Rangers had games in hand which they won to overtake Hearts and lift the trophy.

Walker completed the set of having won all three major Scottish football trophies with the League Championship in 1957–58. Conn suffered a serious ankle injury meaning he only played in five league games all season. Injury hit Conn left Hearts for Raith Rovers in September 1958 just two years after his 1956 zenith. He did so after 408 first team games and 221 goals. With an injury hit Bauld only playing nine times in the league title win a new Hearts attacking trio were dominant. For a third time Wardhaugh was the League's top marksman with 28 strikes. This was one ahead of Jimmy Murray's 27 and four more than Young's 24. Mackay, now captain, was fourth in Hearts' league scoring charts with 12. Hearts won that League title in 1957–58 with record-breaking points, goals scored and goal difference. Their record from 34 league games of 62 points out of a maximum possible 68 was 13 more than their nearest rival. They scored 132 goals (still the Scottish top tier record) with only 29 against for a record net difference of +103. This was Hearts' greatest ever league side. Murray and Mackay both played for Scotland at the 1958 FIFA World Cup where Murray scored in a 1–1 draw against Yugoslavia. Parker was a fringe player in the league winning season, his last season as a Hearts player. He moved to the club coaching staff before joining the Board of Directors where he also had a spell as chairman.

In the 1958–59 Scottish League Cup group stage Hearts eliminated Rangers. That October the 1958 Scottish League Cup final was won with a heavy 5–1 defeat of Partick Thistle. Bauld and Murray each scored two and Johnny Hamilton netted one. Hearts defended their league title by being leaders in mid December. However a side visiting Ibrox missing injured Mackay were beaten 5–0 with all goals in the first 35 minutes. This put Rangers into top position in the table on goal average. This precipitated a run of only two wins from the next seven games without injured Mackay. Hearts beat Queen of the South in a 2–1 home league win on 7 March 1959. After that QoS game Rangers with six games to play were firm favourites for the title, six points ahead of second placed Hearts. Even if Hearts were to win their remaining seven games including a game in hand and beating Rangers in their visit Tynecastle in Rangers' penultimate game of the season, Rangers would still have to drop two points elsewhere and give away a superior goal average. The league game against QoS was Mackay's last for Hearts after they accepted a bid of £32,000 from Tottenham Hotspur for their captain who was fit at this time despite having had lengthy spells out injured in the previous 12 months. Bobby Rankin was brought in to bolster the squad and scored twice in each of his first two games (both victories). On the penultimate Saturday of the league campaign goals by Cumming and Rankin at home to Rangers meant Hearts were four points behind with a game in hand. In midweek they next won 4–2 at Aberdeen with Rankin scoring a hat-trick. The last day of the season began with Rangers two points clear with an identical goal average to Hearts. Rangers thus needed a point to clinch the title but lost 2–1 at home to Aberdeen. Despite missing Bobby Kirk at right back with a knee injury, Rankin's ninth goal from his fifth Hearts game had Hearts 1–0 up at half time at Celtic Park. Any victory would have given Hearts the title. Then Celtic's Bertie Auld playing at left wing equalised before Eric Smith scored Celtic's winning second goal to seal the title for their cross city rivals leaving those at Tynecastle to wonder what would have happened if Mackay hadn't been sold when he was.

Mackay's name as a club mainstay at half back was eventually taken over by Billy Higgins. That League Cup win was also Glidden's last trophy as a recurring back injury that season numbered his playing days at Tynecastle. 36 year old MacKenzie left in 1959 as did Wardhaugh. He scored 206 goals in 304 league games and a total of 376 goals in 518 games for Hearts.

After collecting three Scottish championships and 19 full Scotland caps at Hibernian, Gordon Smith had a recurring ankle injury leading to his free transfer in 1959. Smith believed that an operation could cure the injury and paid for an operation on the offending ankle himself. He then signed for Hearts, his boyhood heroes. He enjoyed immediate success at Tynecastle, winning both the 1959 Scottish League Cup final and league title in his first season with the club. Hamilton scored for Hearts in that second successive League Cup Final and Young hit the winner. Third Lanark were beaten 2–1. 1960 ended with Walker being awarded the OBE for services to football.

The 1960s saw Hearts fortunes fluctuate as Walker attempted to adapt to football's tactical changes by implementing a 4–2–4 formation. Young and Thomson departed for Everton in November 1960. At Everton Young was known as The Golden Vision and became another from the Walker production line of full Scotland internationalists. Smith had an injury hit season leading to his joining Dundee (who became the third club with whom he won the Scottish title). Hearts signed further future full internationalists in Willie Wallace and David Holt. Hearts lost the 1961 Scottish League Cup final after a replay. Cumming scored a deserved equalising penalty for Hearts in the first game 1–1 draw they largely dominated against the Scot Symon managed Rangers. Norrie Davidson scored a then equalising Hearts goal when they lost in the 3–1 replay defeat.

Bauld left Hearts in 1962 with 355 goals from 510 first team appearances. Another future internationalist, Willie Hamilton, joined for the run culminating in the 1962 Scottish League Cup final win. Hearts won the trophy for a fourth time with a 1–0 final win over Willie Waddell's fine Kilmarnock side of that era. Davidson's goal this time proved decisive. Like in the 1954–55 win Hearts eliminated Celtic in that 1962–63 Scottish League Cup group stage.

In 1964–65 Hearts fought out a championship title race with Waddell's Kilmarnock. In the era of two points for a win Hearts were three points clear with two games remaining. Hearts drew with Dundee United meaning the last game of the season with the two title challengers playing each other at Tynecastle would be a league decider. Kilmarnock needed to win by a two-goal margin to take the title. Hearts entered the game as favourites with both a statistical and home advantage. They also had a solid pedigree of trophy winning under Walker. Waddell's Kilmarnock in contrast had been nearly men. Four times in the previous five seasons they had finished league runners-up including Hearts’ triumph in 1960. Killie had also lost three domestic cup finals during the same period including the 1962 League Cup Final defeat to Hearts. Hearts had won five of the six senior cup finals they played in under Walker. Even the final they had lost was in a replay after drawing the first game. Hearts' Roald Jensen hit the post after six minutes. Kilmarnock then scored twice through Davie Sneddon and Brian McIlroy after 27 and 29 minutes. Alan Gordon had an excellent chance to clinch the title for Hearts in second half injury time but was denied by a Bobby Ferguson diving save pushing the ball past the post. The 2–0 defeat meant Hearts lost the title by an average of 0.042 goals. Subsequently, Hearts were instrumental in pushing through a change to use goal difference to separate teams level on points. Ironically this rule change later denied Hearts the title in 1985–86.

Following a slump in results, Walker resigned in September 1966. Under his management Hearts had won 7 senior trophies and been runners up in five others. Cumming left the playing staff a year later and joined the coaching team.

=== Later 20th century ===
The highlight of the late 60s was the run to the 1968 Scottish Cup Final when they lost 3–1 to George Farm's Dunfermline Athletic. The players of greatest note in the late sixties were Jim Cruickshank, Alan Anderson and Donald Ford with Drew Busby joining the three in the 1970s. The high point of the 1970s was another run to the Scottish Cup Final. In 1975–76 they again lost 3–1 in the final this time to Rangers. After the advent of the ten team Premier Division in 1975, Hearts were subsequently relegated for the first time in 1977. This began a sequence of yo-yoing between the Premier League and First Division six times in seven seasons.

On 25 May 1981, 34-year-old Wallace Mercer became chairman after buying a controlling interest in Hearts for £265,000. Hearts had just been relegated from the top flight for the third time in five seasons. The following December (1981), Mercer promoted Alex MacDonald to be player-manager. At the end of the 1982–83 season, Hearts were promoted back to the top flight. This marked an upturn in their fortunes to rejoin the more competitive clubs in Scotland's top flight. The 1985–86 season was their best since 1965. The league campaign started with the loss of five of the first eight games. From there the club went on a 27-game unbeaten league run, reaching the top of the league on 21 December after a 1–0 win at St Mirren.

Hearts needed a draw from the last game of the season away to Dundee on 3 May 1986 to win the Scottish league title. Before that final game they were two points ahead of Celtic and with a superior goal difference of four goals. However, this strong statistical position was undermined in the run up to the game when several players in the Hearts squad were hit by a viral infection. Craig Levein failed to recover to make the game in Dundee. Celtic were 4–0 up away at St Mirren at half time in their final fixture. Thus, at half time the players knew that they would have to deliver a result at Dens Park. Substitute Albert Kidd forced Hearts to concede a corner kick with seven minutes remaining. The in-swinging corner was touched on and fell to Kidd who put Dundee ahead. This was the first goal Hearts had conceded from a corner all season. Hearts now needed an equaliser to win the title. However, Kidd went on a run with the ball from the halfway line down the right wing beating two Hearts players. After then playing a one-two with a teammate on the edge of the Hearts box he finished to score a second with four minutes left. Dundee won 2–0. This combined with Celtic winning 5–0 against St Mirren meant the top two clubs finished the season on the same number of points. Hearts lost out to Celtic by a goal difference of three. Had goal difference been the rule in 1965 Hearts would have been champions; had goal average still applied in 1986, they would have won the league. Hearts lobbying after the league loss in 1965 cost them the title in 1986.

Hearts had been chasing a League and Scottish Cup double. After eliminating Rangers and Jim McLean's Dundee United they faced Alex Ferguson's Aberdeen in the final; Aberdeen won 3–0 meaning Hearts finished runners-up as they had in the league.

Hearts finished league runners-up again in 1988 and 1992. The club reached the quarter-finals of the 1988–89 UEFA Cup losing out to Bayern Munich 2–1 on aggregate. After MacDonald's summer 1990 departure the club struggled to settle on a manager. Within a two-year period, Joe Jordan, Sandy Clark and Tommy McLean were all sacked. From April 1989 to April 1994, Hearts went on a run of 22 games in a row without defeat against arch-rivals Hibernian in the Edinburgh derby.

In 1994 Mercer sold his shares in Hearts to Chris Robinson and Leslie Deans. Under Mercer, Hearts finished second in the Scottish top tier three times and once in the Scottish Cup, but his time at the helm concluded without senior silverware. His personal influence at the club is perhaps best remembered with an attempted merger with Hibs in 1990. Seen by Hibs fans as an attempted take over to liquidate their club, Mercer's attempts were met with bitterness and acrimony before he backed away.

In 1998, Hearts beat Rangers 2–1 to lift the Scottish Cup under the management of ex Hearts player, Jim Jefferies. Colin Cameron scored a first-minute penalty and Stéphane Adam added after half time. This was Hearts' first senior trophy win since the 1962–63 Scottish League Cup won in the Tommy Walker era.

=== Into the 21st century ===
Hearts finished third in 2003 and 2004, and reached the inaugural group stages of the UEFA Cup in 2004–05, but finished bottom of their group, despite Robbie Neilson's goal giving a 2–1 victory over FC Basel. During the 2004–05 season, they finished fifth in the league.

In 2004, then club CEO Chris Robinson announced plans to sell Tynecastle, which he claimed was "not fit for purpose", and instead have Hearts rent Murrayfield from the Scottish Rugby Union. This move was deemed necessary due to the club's increasingly large debt. The plan was very unpopular with supporters, and a campaign, entitled Save Our Hearts, was set up to try to block the move. As Robinson and his supporters had a slight majority of the club's shares, a preliminary deal to sell the stadium was struck with the Cala property development company for just over £20 million.

=== The Romanov era ===
In August 2004 in the midst of Hearts' financial difficulties Russian-Lithuanian multi-millionaire Vladimir Romanov entered into talks to take over Hearts in what was dubbed the "Romanov Revolution". Romanov had already made failed attempts to purchase Dundee United, Dundee and Dunfermline. Romanov offered the prospect of the club staying at a redeveloped Tynecastle, which was very attractive to Hearts supporters. At the end of September 2004 Chris Robinson agreed to sell his 19.6% stake to Romanov. Romanov called an extraordinary general meeting in January 2005 so that the club could pass a motion to exercise the escape clause in the deal with Cala Homes. The backing of Leslie Deans and the McGrail brothers meant that the motion was passed with over 70% support. The sale of Robinson's shares was completed on 2 February 2005 after Romanov made financial guarantees that the club could continue to trade without selling Tynecastle. This sale increased Romanov's stake to 29.9%, giving him effective control of the club. Romanov's takeover was welcomed by a fans' representative. Romanov increased his shareholding in Hearts to 55.5% on 21 October 2005, and offered to buy the rest of the shares. Chairman George Foulkes sold his shares to Romanov and encouraged others to do likewise. Romanov eventually increased his majority share in Hearts to 82%.

Romanov's management of the club's debt became a cause for concern. During his takeover Romanov pledged to eradicate the club's debt. Soon after the takeover was completed, the debt was transferred from HBOS and SMG to the financial institutions controlled by Romanov, Ūkio bankas and UBIG. At the end of July 2007 the club were £36M in debt. On 7 July 2008, Hearts issued a statement that stated the club would issue debt for equity to reduce the debt by £12M. A further issue was completed in 2010. Since the takeover Hearts had failed to pay players wages on time on several occasions, and were threatened with administration twice due to failure to pay an outstanding tax bills with the bill finally being settled in August 2011. Results released for the financial year ending 31 July 2010 showed that Hearts had made a small profit for the first time since 1999, although they were still heavily in debt.

Hearts' first manager of the Romanov era was George Burley, who was appointed during close season by new chief executive Phil Anderton, who replaced Chris Robinson as chief executive. With their new manager and signings, Hearts got off to a tremendous start in the 2005–06 season. The team won their first eight league matches, equalling a club record set in 1914. Romanov shocked Scottish football by sacking George Burley on the following day while Hearts were sitting top of the SPL table; Hearts ultimately finished second. Hearts fans were led to expect a "top class manager" would replace Burley. Kevin Keegan, Bobby Robson, Claudio Ranieri and Ottmar Hitzfeld were all linked with the vacancy. Anderton, who had been making the approaches for these coaches, was sacked by Romanov on 31 October 2005. Foulkes, who had helped to bring Romanov to the club in the first place, resigned in protest at Anderton's dismissal. Romanov replaced both of them with his son, Roman Romanov. This proved to be a feature of his time at the club, going through nine permanent managers in seven years. The next managerial change after those came on 1 August 2011 when Jim Jefferies was sacked during his second spell at the club and replaced by former Sporting CP boss Paulo Sérgio.

Romanov stated that his ultimate aim was for Hearts to win the Champions League. Hearts competed in the Champions League during season 2006–07 but progressed only as far the second qualifying round before dropping down to the UEFA Cup. Under Romanov Hearts were unable to split the Old Firm for a second time to earn a Champions League place. Hearts target became finishing third in the SPL.

Romanov also owned the Lithuanian club FBK Kaunas and Belarusian club FC Partizan Minsk. Several players were loaned by FBK Kaunas to Hearts when Romanov acquired control of the club.

The club began experiencing severe financial problems in November 2011, which meant they were unable to pay the players' wages, and the club was put up for sale. The squad's October salaries were late and the November wages were paid twenty-nine days late, just one day before their December salaries were due. The December pay failed to arrive on time, and a complaint was lodged with the Scottish Premier League by the players' union. During this period the club advised fringe players they were free to leave the club. On 4 January 2012 the SPL ordered Hearts to pay all outstanding wages by 11 January 2012 and insisted that January's wages had to be paid on time on 16 January. Hearts paid all outstanding wages that day following the sale of Eggert Jónsson to Wolves. On 17 January, the day after Hearts' wages were due to be paid, it was revealed all players had been paid. Despite this, the SPL issued a statement saying Hearts had failed to pay all players on 16 January and an emergency board meeting had been called; Hearts refuted this, saying payment of the remuneration had been made to all players. On 7 November 2012, Hearts were issued with a winding-up order by the Court of Session in Edinburgh after failing to pay a tax bill on time.

In early June 2013, during the close season, a Hearts media statement stated that they would need to raise £500,000 in capital to keep the club up and running during the break between seasons. With no match day income coming in and a lack of finance from owner Romanov, the club were left in a position where they had to put their whole squad up for sale.

On 17 June 2013, Heart of Midlothian began the process of entering into administration with debts of £25 million, owing recently bankrupt Ūkio bankas £15 million.

On 18 June 2013, a Scandinavian consortium offered to pay the club £500,000 immediately in return for a share of any future transfer income from up to 12 players; this was rejected by Hearts. The process of entering administration began on 19 June 2013 when the club's parent company, Ukio Bankas Investment Group (UBIG), filed papers at the Court of Session on Edinburgh for accountancy firm BDO to be named as administrators.

=== Administration ===
On 17 June 2013 Hearts announced that they had lodged court papers stating their intention to enter administration, and on 19 June 2013 the administrators BDO were appointed to run the club. This meant that the club was unable to register players over 21 until February 2014 at the earliest. As long as they were still in administration they would not be able to bring in players of any age.

As well as the signing embargo, Hearts were to be deducted a third of the previous season's points tally which meant the club would start the 2013–2014 season with −15 points. During this period the BDO administrator Trevor Birch pleaded with Hearts fans to purchase season tickets and stated that they needed to sell at least another 3,000 season tickets to raise another £800,000 to keep the club running and avoiding liquidation. The fans met this number and took total season ticket sales beyond the 10,000 mark, giving the club more survival time. A deadline of 12 July 2013 was set for interested parties to put in formal bids for the club; there were three bids entered for the club which were received from the supporters group "The Foundation of Hearts", the second from a new company called "HMFC limited" which was backed by American firm Club Sports 9 and a third from former Livingston FC owner Angelo Massone through Five Star Football Limited.

On 15 August 2013, The Foundation of Hearts were given preferred bidders status to make a CVA with Hearts' creditors. The money that the foundation used to purchase the club came from monthly donations from fans; the foundation received an interest-free loan from a wealthy fan, which was to be paid back using the monthly direct debts from the fans. On 2 December, Hearts' creditors agreed to the CVA deal proposed by The Foundation of Hearts.

The club's relegation from the Scottish Premiership was confirmed on 5 April 2014. Hearts won 4–2 away to Partick Thistle, but St Mirren beat Motherwell 3–2, making it impossible for Hearts to catch up.

On Monday 12 May 2014, the Ann Budge-fronted Bidco 1874 took control of Heart of Midlothian Plc, thus bringing to an end to Vladimir Romanov's involvement with the club. Budge, became an unpaid executive chairwoman of the club. The Bidco group planned to hold the club for a possible five years, before the fan-backed Foundation of Hearts supporters group would take control. The foundation put in £1 million for the running of the club until the final legal exit of administration. The foundation then paid a further £2.6 million (£2.5m to cover the loan given by Bidco1874 Ltd to Hearts to finance the Creditors' Voluntary Agreement + £100,000 for the shares) to take 75% of the shares in the club, and with that the running and decision making within the club. In addition, the Foundation also committed itself to provide a further £2.8m (£1.4m per year for two years) working capital for the club. Funding for the deal came from 8,000+ people donating cash via a monthly direct debit.

The club officially exited administration on 11 June 2014, also bringing to an end the signing embargo that had been imposed upon the club a year earlier.

=== Post-administration ===
Hearts earned an immediate return to the Scottish Premiership by clinching the 2014–15 Scottish Championship title with seven games remaining. Hearts remained undefeated for the first 20 league matches before a 3–2 home defeat to Falkirk ended that run. They won the title by winning 29 of 36 games, scoring 96 goals and conceding just 26, with a points total of 91. They finished the season 21 points ahead of their city rivals and nearest challengers Hibernian and 24 points ahead of third-placed Rangers. The season included handing Cowdenbeath a joint-club record 10–0 defeat. At the PFA Scotland Awards, Hearts had six players named in Championship Team of the Year, two Young Player of the Year nominees, and three Championship Player of the Year nominees, while Robbie Neilson was shortlisted for Manager of the Year.

This period of renewed stability unravelled in the years following 2015. Despite finishing as runners-up in the 2019 Scottish Cup final, the club could only achieve mid-table placings in 2017, 2018 and 2019. This decline took a turn for the worse in 2019–20 as Hearts were relegated after finishing bottom of the Scottish Premiership, having won only four matches across the course of the season which had been truncated due to the COVID-19 pandemic. Their relegation was confirmed in June 2020, after league reconstruction talks instigated by Budge collapsed. The club confirmed that they would be pursuing legal action against the SPFL following their demotion to the Scottish Championship. The legal action failed, as a Scottish Football Association arbitration panel ruled that the SPFL had acted within its powers.

Robbie Neilson was appointed as Hearts manager for a second time in June 2020, signing a three-year deal after leaving Dundee United, who had recently been promoted to the Scottish Premiership. Former manager Jim Jefferies was recruited as an advisor to the board and manager in July. In August 2020, Andrew McKinlay was appointed as the club's new Chief Executive. In June 2021, club captain Steven Naismith announced his retirement from football, taking up the role of Football Development Manager, focusing on the development of youth players "making their way towards the first team".

On 30 August 2021, Hearts chairwoman Ann Budge officially transferred the club's shares to the Foundation of Hearts, meaning Hearts officially became the biggest fan-owned club in the United Kingdom.

Hearts won the 2020–21 Scottish Championship, finishing ahead of second-placed Dundee by 12 points and confirming their return to the Scottish Premiership. In their first season back in the top flight, Hearts finished third and secured European group stage football in the UEFA Conference League. The following season, Hearts secured a fourth-placed finish. After finishing third in the 2023–24 season they returned to European football; initially entering the UEFA Europa League final play-off stage, however, they failed to advance and dropped into the UEFA Conference League league stage. After gaining a single point in their first six league games of the 2024–25 season (the worst start to a season in the club's history), manager Steven Naismith was sacked on 22 September 2024, with Neil Critchley replacing him as head coach a month later.

After discussions with Brighton owner Tony Bloom throughout the 2024–25 season, on 20 November 2024 Hearts announced that they would become the first partner of Jamestown Analytics in Scotland, the same company used by Bloom's own Brighton in the Premier League, Como in Serie A and Royale Union Saint-Gilloise in the Belgian Pro League. The software was first used to appoint Critchley as head coach in October after Naismith had been sacked. Critchley was later sacked in April after failing to make the top six before the split. On 25 June 2025, Hearts announced that Tony Bloom would officially join the Hearts board after completing a £10m investment, giving him a 29% stake in the club. Hearts began the 2025–26 season with an unbeaten run under Derek McInnes, including a 3–1 win over 2024–25 Scottish Premiership winners Celtic. The club remained at the top of the league for most of the 2025–26 campaign, but a 3–1 away defeat to Celtic on the final matchday saw them drop to second place.

On 17 June 2026, after a year at the club, McInnes departed to assume the role of manager at Rangers. Wouter Vrancken succeeded him as Heart of Midlothian manager on 25 June.

== Colours and badge ==
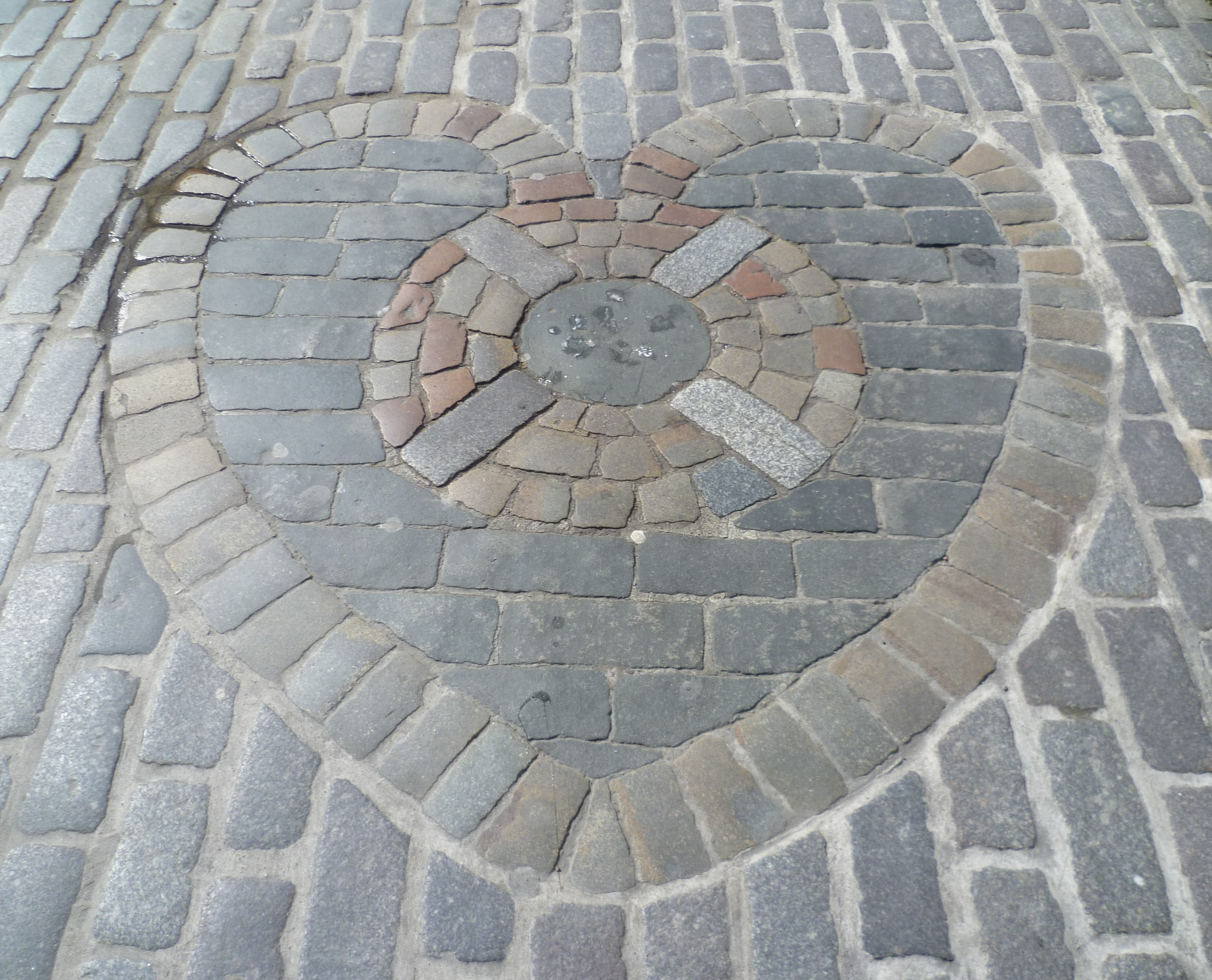
The Heart of Midlothian mosaic, on which the current club crest is based

The original Hearts football strip was all white shirts and trousers with maroon trimmings, and a heart sewn onto the chest. For one season they played in red, white and blue stripes. These were the colours of a club called St. Andrew, who had taken their name and colours from the University of St Andrews, that Hearts had absorbed. Since then the predominant club colours have been maroon and white. The strip typically has a maroon top and a white collar, although the strip was predominantly white in the 2010–11 season. The club's 2024-25 home shirt was all-maroon. The shorts are normally white, although maroon shorts and socks are sometimes worn.

The badge is a heart, based on the Heart of Midlothian mosaic on the Royal Mile. There is a tradition to spit on the mosaic when passing, harking back to the days when the city jail stood there.

For the 2014–15 season the club chose to commemorate 100 years since McCrae's Battalion with not only a commemorative strip, of maroon shirt, white shorts and black socks, but with a commemorative badge as well. The club chose to have no sponsor on the home top as a mark of respect to those who had joined the regiment.

=== Kit manufacturers and sponsors ===
Period	Kit manufacturer	Shirt sponsor (front)	Shirt sponsor (sleeve)
1975–1982	(England) Umbro	No sponsor	No sponsor
1982–1984	(England) Umbro	Alexander's	No sponsor
1984–1985	(England) Umbro	Renault	No sponsor
1985–1986	(England) Umbro	Mita	No sponsor
1986–1987	(England) Bukta	Mita	No sponsor
1987–1988	(England) Bukta	Mita Copiers	No sponsor
1988	(England) Bukta	No sponsor	No sponsor
1988–1989	(England) Bukta	Novaphone	No sponsor
1989–1990	(England) Bukta	Thorn Security	No sponsor
1990–1991	(England) Bukta	Miller Homes	No sponsor
1991–1992	(England) Admiral	Miller Homes	No sponsor
1992–1993	(England) Admiral	Strongbow	No sponsor
1993–1995	(Japan) Asics	Strongbow	No sponsor
1995–1997	(United States) Pony	Strongbow	No sponsor
1997–2000	(Belgium) Olympic Sports	Strongbow	No sponsor
2000–2002	(Italy) Erreà	Strongbow	No sponsor
2002–2005	(United States) Reebok	all:sports	No sponsor
2005–2007	(Denmark) Hummel	Ūkio bankas	No sponsor
2007–2011	(England) Umbro	Ūkio bankas	No sponsor
2011–2012	(England) Umbro	Wonga.com	No sponsor
2012–2014	(Germany) Adidas	Wonga.com	No sponsor
2014–2015	(Germany) Adidas	No sponsor (Home) / Foundation of Hearts (Away)	No sponsor
2015–2017	(Germany) Puma	Save the Children	No sponsor
2017–2021	(England) Umbro	Save the Children	No sponsor
2021–2022	(England) Umbro	MND Scotland	No sponsor
2022–2024	(England) Umbro	MND Scotland (Home) / Stellar Omada (Away and Third)	No sponsor
2024	(England) Umbro	MND Scotland (Home) / Stellar Omada (Away and Third)	FanHub
2024–2025	(England) Umbro	Stellar Omada	ASC Edinburgh Ltd
2025–	(Denmark) Hummel	Stellar Omada	ASC Edinburgh Ltd

== Stadium ==
Hearts initially played at the Meadows, Powburn and Powderhall before moving to the Gorgie area in 1881. In 1886, they moved to their current site, Tynecastle Park; named for the Tynecastle Tollhouse at the entrance to the grounds of Merchiston. The stadium has hosted nine full Scotland international matches.

For most of the 20th century, Tynecastle was a mostly terraced ground, with a seated main stand that was designed by Archibald Leitch and opened in 1919. The terraced sections were replaced by the Gorgie, Wheatfield and Roseburn Stands in the mid-1990s, making Tynecastle an all-seated stadium. In 2017, the main stand was demolished and replaced by a brand new stand which increased the ground's capacity to 20,099. While this work was undertaken, Hearts played some of their home league matches at the nearby Murrayfield Stadium.

== Rivalry ==
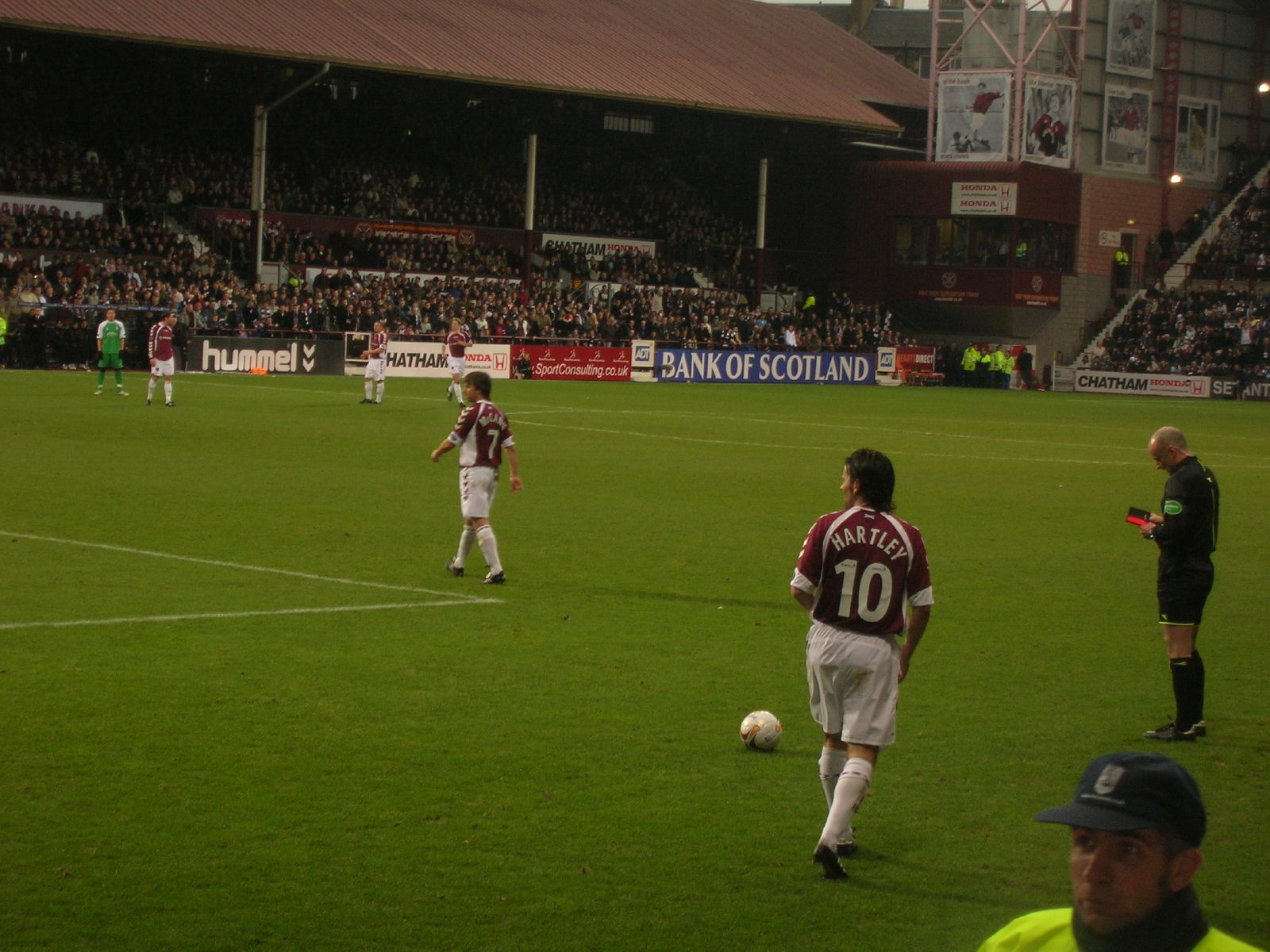
Hearts midfielder Paul Hartley (No. 10) prepares to take a free kick in an Edinburgh derby match against Hibernian, played on 26 December 2006.

Hearts have a traditional local rivalry in Edinburgh with Hibernian; the Edinburgh derby match between the two clubs is one of the oldest rivalries in world football. Graham Spiers has described it as "one of the jewels of the Scottish game". The clubs first met on Christmas Day 1875, when Hearts won 1–0, in the first match ever contested by Hibs. The two clubs became distinguished in Edinburgh after a five-game struggle for the Edinburgh Football Association Cup in 1878, which Hearts finally won with a 3–2 victory after four successive draws. The clubs have met twice in a Cup Final, in the 1896 Scottish Cup final, which Hearts won 3–1 and the 2012 Scottish Cup final which Hearts won 5–1. The 1896 final is also notable for being the only Scottish Cup Final to be played outside Glasgow.

Hearts have the better record in derbies. Approximately half of all derbies have been played in local competitions and friendlies. Hibs recorded the biggest derby win in a competitive match when they won 7–0 at Tynecastle on New Year's Day 1973.

While it has been noted that religious, ethnic or political background lies behind the rivalry, that aspect has been described as minor in relation to the sectarianism in Glasgow. In practice geography has been the main factor in establishing the support bases of the Edinburgh rivals; support for Hibs has always been founded in Leith and the surrounding areas in the north and east of the city, while the rest of Edinburgh has tended towards Hearts. Although the clubs are inescapable rivals, the rivalry is largely "good-natured" and has had beneficial effects due to the demographic diversities, considering both clubs' territories have a variety of neighbourhoods that differ economically, politically, denominationally, or all three at once.

== Supporters and culture ==
Heart of Midlothian are one of two full-time professional football clubs in Edinburgh. Hearts' average attendance during the 2022–23 season was 18,525. Important matches (particularly the Edinburgh derby, European fixtures, and games against the Old Firm) always see Tynecastle at or very close to full capacity.

=== Songs and chants ===
"The Hearts Song" was written and performed by Scottish comedian Hector Nicol, a St Mirren fan. A new, modernised version of "The Hearts Song" performed by Colin Chisholm and the Glasgow Branch, is often played before matches at Tynecastle.

In the latter half of the 2025–26 season, during which Hearts challenged for the Scottish Premiership title, Chisholm himself performed the song prior to Hearts' home fixtures against Aberdeen, Motherwell, Rangers and Falkirk.

=== In popular culture ===
Celebrity fans of Hearts include Stephen Hendry, Ronnie Corbett, Ken Stott, Alex Salmond, Sir Chris Hoy, Wattie Buchan, and Eilidh Doyle.

Grove Street and the Ballas, two rival gangs in the 2004 video game Grand Theft Auto: San Andreas, dress in green and maroon clothes respectively. Since Grand Theft Auto developer Rockstar North is based in Edinburgh, fans believe this to be a reference to Hearts and their Edinburgh derby rivals Hibernian.

Hearts were featured in the American comedy-drama series Succession (in the episodes "Dundee" and "DC") as part of a storyline in which Roman Roy buys the team to impress his Scottish-born billionaire father Logan Roy, only to discover that Logan actually supports Hearts' rivals Hibs.

In the 2022 film Aftersun, Sophie (Frankie Corio) can be seen wearing a 1998–99 Hearts shirt on more than one occasion.

== Players ==
=== Current squad ===
As of 3 September 2026

Note: Flags indicate national team as defined under FIFA eligibility rules; some limited exceptions apply. Players may hold more than one non-FIFA nationality.

No.	Pos.	Nation	Player
1	GK	NED	Beau Reus
2	DF	NOR	Christian Borchgrevink
3	DF	SCO	Stephen Kingsley (vice-captain)
4	DF	SCO	Craig Halkett (captain)
5	DF	SCO	Jamie McCart (fourth captain)
6	DF	IRL	Oisin McEntee
7	MF	SCO	Calvin Miller
8	MF	BRA	Eduardo Ageu
9	FW	USA	JJ Williams
10	FW	POR	Cláudio Braga
11	FW	BFA	Pierre Landry Kaboré
12	MF	FRA	Tom Renaud
14	FW	BEL	Elton Kabangu
15	FW	SCO	Josh McPake
16	MF	SCO	Blair Spittal (fifth captain)
17	DF	SCO	Stuart Findlay
18	DF	SCO	Harry Milne (third captain)

No.	Pos.	Nation	Player
19	FW	FRA	Sabri Guendouz
20	MF	SUI	Leart Kabashi
21	FW	SCO	James Wilson
22	MF	ISL	Tómas Bent Magnússon
23	DF	NED	Jordi Altena
27	FW	FRO	Aron Benjaminsen
28	GK	SCO	Zander Clark
29	MF	ALB	Sabah Kerjota
30	GK	SCO	Ryan Fulton
31	MF	ENG	Yan Dhanda
33	MF	SCO	Finlay Pollock
34	GK	SCO	Kieran Wright
64	DF	ENG	Malachi Fagan-Walcott
74	FW	UGA	Rogers Mato
77	FW	FRA	Amadou Ba-Sy
78	MF	FRA	Laurent Mendy

=== On loan ===
Note: Flags indicate national team as defined under FIFA eligibility rules; some limited exceptions apply. Players may hold more than one non-FIFA nationality.

No.	Pos.	Nation	Player
24	DF	ENG	MJ Kamson-Kamara (on loan at Kilmarnock)
25	GK	SCO	Liam McFarlane (on loan at Partick Thistle)
32	DF	SCO	Adam Forrester (on loan at Ross County)
36	MF	SCO	Callum Sandilands (on loan at Greenock Morton)
38	MF	SCO	Gus Stevenson (co-operation loan with Stenhousemuir)
39	DF	SCO	Matthew Gillies (co-operation loan with Stenhousemuir)
42	DF	SCO	Euan Glasgow (co-operation loan with Edinburgh City)
45	FW	SCO	Connor Dow (co-operation loan with East Fife)

No.	Pos.	Nation	Player
48	MF	SCO	Stanley Wilson (co-operation loan with Edinburgh City)
49	MF	SCO	Liam Walker (co-operation loan with East Fife)
50	GK	SCO	Jack Lyon (co-operation loan with Bonnyrigg Rose)
70	GK	SCO	Harry Stone (on loan at Ayr United)
—	MF	SCO	Cormac Daly (on loan at Arbroath)
—	MF	AUS	Calem Nieuwenhof (on loan at Perth Glory)
—	FW	SCO	Tommy North (co-operation loan with Edinburgh City)
—	FW	CRC	Kenneth Vargas (on loan at Kalamata)

=== Retired numbers ===
Note: Flags indicate national team as defined under FIFA eligibility rules; some limited exceptions apply. Players may hold more than one non-FIFA nationality.

No.	Pos.	Nation	Player
26	DF	LTU	Marius Žaliūkas (posthumous)

=== Development and under-20s squad ===
For more information on reserves and under-20s, see Heart of Midlothian F.C. Reserves and Academy

=== Hearts Women squad ===
For more information on Hearts Women squad, see Heart of Midlothian W.F.C. § Players

== Club staff ==
=== Corporate staff ===
Position	Name
Honorary president	Ann Budge
Chairman	Calum Paterson
Non executive director	James Anderson
Non executive director	Ralph Findlay
Non executive director	James Franks
Non executive director	Claire Hammond
Finance director	Euan Forbes
Sporting director	Graeme Jones
Club ambassador	Gary Locke
Foundation of Hearts chairman	Gerry Mallon
Central services director	Lesley Blair
Marketing & commercial director	Catriona McCallum

=== Coaching staff ===
Position	Name
Head coach	Wouter Vrancken
Assistant head coaches	Tim Smolders; Céderique Tulleners
First team coach	Lee Wallace
Goalkeeping coach	Gordon Marshall
Goalkeeping coach analyst	Jamie MacDonald
Set plays coach	Liam Ross
Technical development manager	Shelley Kerr
Academy director	Andy Webster
Head of academy coaching	Laurie Ellis
Head of medical	Stevie Walker
Performance analyst	Tom White
Physiotherapist	Joel Cliffe
Sports scientist	Mike Williams

=== Hearts Women staff ===
For more information on Hearts Women staff, see Heart of Midlothian W.F.C. § Coaching Staff

== Managers ==
Name	Tenure
(Scotland) Peter Fairley	1901–1903
(Scotland) William Waugh	1903–1908
(Scotland) James McGhee	1908–1909
(Scotland) John McCartney	1910–1919
(Scotland) Willie McCartney	1919–1935
(Scotland) David Pratt	1935–1937
(England) Frank Moss	1937–1940
(Scotland) David McLean	1941–1951
(Scotland) Tommy Walker	1951–1966
(Scotland) John Harvey	1966–1970
(Scotland) Bobby Seith	1970–1974
(Scotland) John Hagart	1974–1977
(Scotland) Willie Ormond	1977–1980
(Scotland) Bobby Moncur	1980–1981
(England) Tony Ford	1981
(Scotland) Alex MacDonald	1982–1986
(Scotland) Sandy Jardine and Alex MacDonald	1986–1988
(Scotland) Alex MacDonald	1988–1990
(Scotland) Joe Jordan	1990–1993
(Scotland) Sandy Clark	1993–1994
(Scotland) Tommy McLean	1994–1995
(Scotland) Jim Jefferies	1995–2000
(Scotland) Craig Levein	2000–2004
(Scotland) John Robertson	2004–2005
(Scotland) George Burley	2005

Name	Tenure
(England) Graham Rix	2005–2006
(Lithuania) Valdas Ivanauskas	2006–2007
(Ukraine) Anatoliy Korobochka	2007–2008
(Scotland) Stephen Frail	2008
(Romania) (Hungary) Csaba Laszlo	2008–2010
(Scotland) Jim Jefferies	2010–2011
(Portugal) Paulo Sérgio	2011–2012
(Scotland) John McGlynn	2012–2013
(Scotland) Gary Locke	2013–2014
(Scotland) Robbie Neilson	2014–2016
(Scotland) Ian Cathro	2016–2017
(Scotland) Craig Levein	2017–2019
(Germany) Daniel Stendel	2019–2020
(Scotland) Robbie Neilson	2020–2023
(Scotland) Steven Naismith	2023–2024
(England) Neil Critchley	2024–2025
(Scotland) Derek McInnes	2025–2026
(Belgium) Wouter Vrancken	2026–present

== Hearts Women ==
In 2009, Hearts took over Musselburgh Windsor Ladies Football Club, changing their name to Hearts Ladies FC. They currently play in the Scottish Women's Premier League under the name Hearts Women.

The team play their home games at The Oriam, Riccarton.

== Honours ==
=== Major honours ===
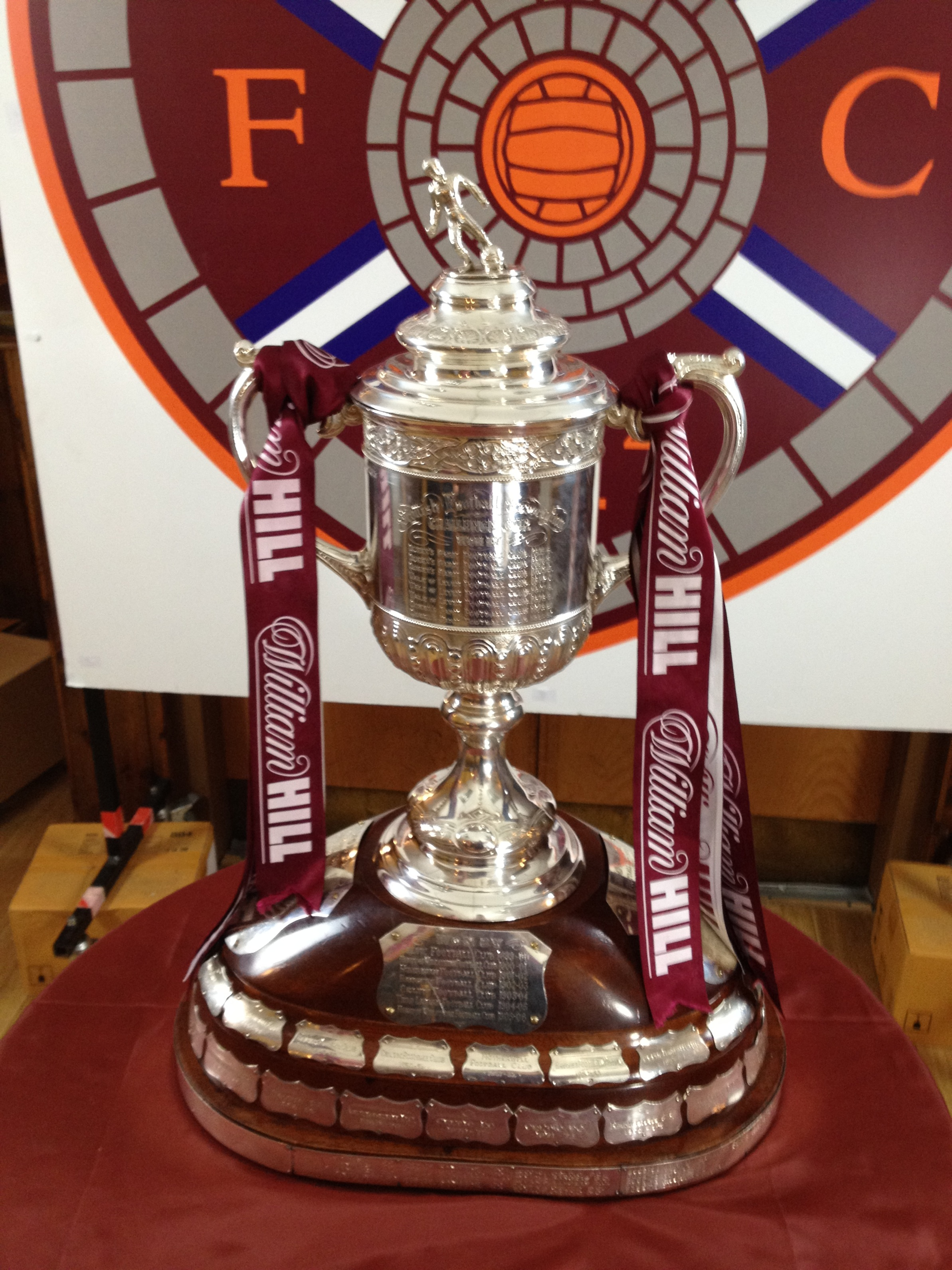
The Scottish Cup is the oldest national trophy in world football. Above, it is draped in maroon and white ribbons following Heart of Midlothian's 5–1 victory over Edinburgh rivals Hibernian in the 2012 final.

- Scottish Premiership and predecessors (1890–present):
  - Champions (4): 1894–95, 1896–97, 1957–58, 1959–60
  - Runners–up (15): 1893–94, 1898–99, 1903–04, 1905–06, 1914–15, 1937–38, 1953–54, 1956–57, 1958–59, 1964–65, 1985–86, 1987–88, 1991–92, 2005–06, 2025–26
- Scottish Cup (1874–present):
  - Winners (8): 1890–91, 1895–96, 1900–01, 1905–06, 1955–56, 1997–98, 2005–06, 2011–12
  - Runners–up (9): 1902–03, 1906–07, 1967–68, 1975–76, 1985–86, 1995–96, 2018–19, 2019–20, 2021–22
- Scottish League Cup (1947–present):
  - Winners (4): 1954–55, 1958–59, 1959–60, 1962–63
  - Runners–up (3): 1961–62, 1996–97, 2012–13

=== Minor honours ===
- Scottish Championship (second tier, 1893–present):
  - Winners (3): 1979–80, 2014–15, 2020–21
  - Runners–up (2): 1977–78, 1982–83
- Victory Cup (1919)
  - Runners–up: 1919
- Inter City Football League (1899–1904): 1901–02, 1902–03 (2, record)
- Edinburgh Football League/East of Scotland League (1894–1908): 1894–95, 1895–96, 1896–97, 1897–98, 1898–99, 1899–1900, 1903–04 (7, record)
- North-Eastern Cup (1908–1914): 1909–10, 1912–13 (2, record)
- Rosebery Charity Cup (1882–1945): 32 times (record)
- Wilson Cup (1906–1946): 21 times (record)
- East of Scotland Shield (1875–1990): 48 times
- Dunedin Cup (1909–1933): 13 times (record)
- Festival Cup (2003–2004): 2003, 2004
- Football World Championship:
  - Winners: 1902
  - Runners–up: 1895

== Player of the year ==
Season	Fans' Player of the Year	Players' Player of the Year	Source(s)
2011–12	(Scotland) Ian Black	(Scotland) Andy Webster	
2012–13	(Lithuania) Marius Žaliūkas	(Scotland) Jamie MacDonald	
2013–14	(Scotland) Jamie MacDonald	(Scotland) Jamie MacDonald	
2014–15	(Scotland) Jamie Walker	(Senegal) Morgaro Gomis	
2015–16	(Cameroon) Arnaud Djoum	(Brazil) Igor Rossi	
2016–17	(Scotland) Jamie Walker		
2017–18	(Scotland) Christophe Berra	(Scotland) Christophe Berra	
2018–19	(Scotland) Steven Naismith	(Scotland) Steven Naismith	
2021–22	(Scotland) Craig Gordon	(Scotland) Craig Gordon	
2022–23	(Scotland) Lawrence Shankland	(Scotland) Lawrence Shankland	
2023–24	(Scotland) Lawrence Shankland	(Scotland) Lawrence Shankland	
2024–25	(Scotland) James Penrice	(Scotland) James Penrice	
2025–26	(Australia) Cammy Devlin	(Portugal) Cláudio Braga	

== Hall of fame ==
Heart of Midlothian established their hall of fame in 2006 to commemorate the "great players whose grit, skill, dedication and professionalism" helped make them a "bedrock" of the club.

=== Players and managers ===
Inductee	Year
(Scotland) John Robertson	2006
(Scotland) Willie Bauld	2006
(Scotland) Dave Mackay	2006
(Scotland) Paul Hartley	2006
(Scotland) Gary Mackay	2006
(Scotland) John Cumming	2006
(Scotland) Steven Pressley	2006
(Scotland) Craig Gordon	2007
(Scotland) Tommy Walker	2007
(Scotland) Jimmy Wardhaugh	2007
(Scotland) Alex Young	2007
(Scotland) Freddie Glidden	2007
(Scotland) Alfie Conn Sr.	2009
(Scotland) Donald Ford	2009
(Scotland) Jim Jefferies	2009
(Scotland) Henry Smith	2009
(Scotland) Bobby Walker	2009

Inductee	Year
(Scotland) Alex MacDonald	2016
(Scotland) Sandy Jardine	2016
(Scotland) (United States) Barney Battles Jr.	2016
(Scotland) John Colquhoun	2016
(Scotland) Ian Crawford	2016
(Scotland) Thomas Haig Purdie	2016
(Scotland) Jim Cruickshank	2016
(England) Gordon Marshall	2016
(Scotland) Drew Busby	2018
(Scotland) Walter Kidd	2018
(Scotland) Alan Anderson	2018
(Scotland) Jock White	2018
(Scotland) Bobby Kirk	2022
(Scotland) Jim Brown	2022

=== Teams ===
1998 Scottish Cup Final winners (Note: Inducted in 2018)

Position	Name
Manager	(Scotland) Jim Jefferies
GK	(France) Gilles Rousset
DF	(Scotland) Dave McPherson
DF	(Scotland) David Weir
DF	(Scotland) Paul Ritchie
DF	(Scotland) Gary Naysmith
DF	(Scotland) Grant Murray
MF	(Italy) Stefano Salvatori (Note: Inducted posthumously)
MF	(Scotland) Neil McCann
MF	(Scotland) Steve Fulton (c)
MF	(Scotland) Colin Cameron
MF	(Austria) Thomas Flögel
FW	(France) Stéphane Adam
FW	(Scotland) John Robertson
FW	(Scotland) Jim Hamilton

2012 Scottish Cup Final winners (Note: Inducted in 2022)

Position	Name
Manager	(Portugal) Paulo Sérgio
GK	(Scotland) Jamie MacDonald
GK	(Scotland) Mark Ridgers
DF	(Australia) Ryan McGowan
DF	(Scotland) Andy Webster
DF	(Lithuania) Marius Žaliūkas (c) (Note: Inducted posthumously)
DF	(England) Danny Grainger
DF	(Ukraine) Denys Prychynenko
MF	(Spain) Suso Santana
MF	(Scotland) Ian Black
MF	(Scotland) Darren Barr
MF	(Czech Republic) Rudi Skácel
MF	(England) Andrew Driver
MF	(Morocco) Mehdi Taouil
FW	(Republic of Ireland) Stephen Elliott
FW	(Scotland) Scott Robinson
FW	(Scotland) Craig Beattie

=== The Wallace Mercer Lifetime Achievement Award ===
Inductee(s)	Year
(Scotland) Wallace Mercer	2006
1914–15 Heart of Midlothian squad	2007
(Scotland) Bobby Parker	2009
(Scotland) Robert Wilson	2016
(Scotland) Pilmar Smith	2018
(Scotland) Clare Cowan	2022

== Club records ==
Attendance

- Highest home attendance: 53,396 v Rangers, 13 February 1932, Scottish Cup, Tynecastle Park
- Highest average home attendance: 28,195, 1948–49 season (15 games)

Single game

- Biggest win: 21–0 vs Anchor, EFA Cup, 1880
- Biggest defeat: 1–8 vs Vale of Leven, Scottish Cup, 1888

Caps and appearances

- Most international caps: Craig Gordon, 84 caps for Scotland (2004–2026)
- Youngest competitive player: Scott Robinson made his debut aged 16 years, 1 month and 14 days old
- Most appearances: Gary Mackay, 640 (515 L, 58 SC, 46 LC, 21 E) 1980 – 1997
- Most league appearances: Gary Mackay, 515
- Most honours: John Cumming, 2 League titles, 1 Scottish Cup, 4 League Cups, 1954–1962

Goals

- Most league goals: John Robertson, 214, 1983–1998
- Most goals in a season: Barney Battles Jr., 44, 1930–31 season

Transfers

- Highest transfer fee paid: £1.7m for Eduardo Ageu to Santa Clara, 2025
- Highest transfer fee received: £9m for Craig Gordon from Sunderland, 2007 (Note: British record fee paid for a goalkeeper at the time)
