= Jimmy Wardhaugh =

Footballer (1929–1978)

Personal information
- Full name: James Alexander Douglas Wardhaugh
- Date of birth: 21 March 1929
- Place of birth: Berwick-upon-Tweed, England
- Date of death: 2 January 1978 (aged 48)
- Place of death: Edinburgh, Scotland
- Position: Inside forward

Youth career
- Shaftesbury Park

Senior career*
Years	Team	Apps	(Gls)
1946–1959	Heart of Midlothian	303	(206)
1959–1961	Dunfermline Athletic	12	(4)
Total		315	(210)

International career
1951–1956	Scottish Football League XI	9	(8)
1954–1956	Scotland	2	(0)
1957	Scotland B	1	(0)
1958	SFL trial v SFA	1	(0)
- * Club domestic league appearances and goals

James Alexander Douglas Wardhaugh (21 March 1929 – 2 January 1978) was a professional footballer, who was part of the Terrible Trio Heart of Midlothian forward line of the 1950s, alongside Willie Bauld and Alfie Conn. He was also the club's record League goal-scorer for almost 40 years, until his tally of 206 was surpassed by John Robertson in 1997. Born in England, he made two appearances for the Scotland national team.

== Heart of Midlothian ==
Born in Berwick-upon-Tweed, Wardhaugh was raised in Edinburgh and began his career with Hearts in 1946. He played regularly in his first year at Tynecastle but missed much of the following 1947–48 season while undertaking his National Service in Worcestershire.

On 9 October 1948, after a mediocre start to the 1948–49 season Hearts' manager Davie McLean combined Wardhaugh with two fellow young forwards, Willie Bauld and Alfie Conn, for the first time. The combination of Wardhaugh's dazzling dribbling and non-stop running, Bauld's cerebral play and prodigious aerial ability, and Conn's energetic, tenacious style and powerful shooting perfectly complemented each other, and their first match as a forward combination ended in a 6–1 defeat of East Fife. This was especially notable as the same opposition had defeated the Maroons 4–0 a matter of weeks earlier.

Quickly dubbed the Terrible Trio, they continued to score freely in the following four seasons, with Wardhaugh notching 77 goals, as Hearts became regular top four finishers, although defensive inconsistency ensured they failed to collect any silverware. During this period, Wardhaugh was subject of a £26,000 bid from Newcastle United in 1952, which was accepted by Hearts. He was unable to agree terms with the Tyneside club though, and the deal fell through.

In 1953–54, Wardhaugh became the A Division's top scorer with 27 goals as Hearts appeared set to win the League championship. A stuttering end to their season saw Celtic overtake them by the season's end but Wardhaugh would earn his first winner's medal later that calendar year. He scored seven times during Hearts progress to the League Cup final in October 1954, including home and away goals against Celtic in the initial group stage. In the Hampden showpiece, he scored the third goal as Motherwell were defeated 4–2, ending the Edinburgh side's 48-year wait for a major trophy.

The following season, 1955–56, Wardhaugh was again the League's leading scorer with 28 goals, although Hearts were not close to challenging Rangers for the title. Instead they focused upon the Scottish Cup and Wardhaugh was part of the side which won Scottish football's Blue Riband event with a 3–1 defeat of Celtic in the final.

By 1957, age and injuries had become an increasing problem for Conn and Bauld, and increasingly Wardhaugh found himself part of a new "trio", alongside young Scotland internationals Jimmy Murray and Alex Young. The new combination helped Hearts to the 1957–58 League Championship, with a record 132 goals scored in 34 games. For a third time, Wardhaugh was the League's top marksman, although he shared this honour with team-mate Murray, the pair both scoring 28 times.

Although Wardhaugh was part of the side that won the 1958–59 League Cup, he too was by this stage becoming a fringe player. He left Hearts in 1959 having scored 375 goals for the side, and a record League total of 206, which was only surpassed by John Robertson 38 years later. He scored 376 goals in 518 games.

== Dunfermline Athletic ==
Speculation linked him with a move to Hearts' city rivals Hibernian. Eventually it was Dunfermline Athletic he joined in 1959 for a fee of £2,000.

== International career ==
Wardhaugh was selected twice for the Scotland national side, making his debut against the 'Magical Magyar' Hungarian team of the early 1950s. his second full cap was in 1954. He played two years later against Northern Ireland in 1956.

His selection could be viewed as controversial as, despite his Scottish parentage and sense of identity, he was born in England, at a time when the home football associations had strict eligibility restrictions for their national sides. Other "Scots" such as Joe Baker and Gordon Marshall were obliged to seek selection for the England national team due to their place of birth. However, for footballing purposes the Scottish Football Association and the Football Association considered their shared boundary to be the River Tweed, allowing Wardhaugh to represent Scotland. His case was helped by the fact that Berwick Rangers, based to the south of his Marshall Meadows birthplace, had competed in Scottish football since 1905.

Wardhaugh also represented the Scottish Football League XI and scored eight goals in nine appearances.

== Post-retirement ==
Wardhaugh retired in 1961 and started a new career in sports journalism. He possessed a keen interest in sports generally and his writing was not limited to football coverage. His first role was with the Edinburgh Evening News, where he developed a particular enthusiasm for ice hockey and was responsible for the paper's coverage of the local Murrayfield Racers. Later he worked for the Scottish Daily Express as well as editing Hearts' official matchday programme.

In the 1970s he worked as a publicity officer for the BBC while continuing to cover live sport events. It was after one such occasion, a match between East Fife and Hearts on 2 January 1978, that he died, collapsing on his way back to his Edinburgh home. His death came less than a year after that of his friend and Terrible Trio team-mate Bauld.

== Honours ==
Heart of Midlothian

- Scottish Football League: 1957–58; runner-up 1953–54, 1956–57, 1958–59
- Scottish Cup: 1955–56
- Scottish League Cup: 1954–55, 1958–59

== See also ==
- List of footballers in Scotland by number of league goals (200+)
- List of Scotland international footballers born outside Scotland
