= Ian Crawford (footballer) =

Scottish footballer and manager

Personal information
- Full name: John Crawford Jr.
- Date of birth: 14 July 1934
- Place of birth: Edinburgh, Scotland
- Date of death: 30 November 2007 (aged 73)
- Place of death: Peterborough, Cambridgeshire, England
- Position: Winger

Youth career
- 1950–1953: Hibernian

Senior career*
Years	Team	Apps	(Gls)
1953–1954	Hamilton Academical	19	(3)
1954–1961	Heart of Midlothian	127	(58)
1961–1963	West Ham United	24	(5)
1963–1964	Scunthorpe United	35	(2)
1964–1968	Peterborough United	196	(6)
Total		401	(74)

International career
1957	Scotland U23	1	(1)

Managerial career
- 1979–1983: HamKam
- 1988: KePS
- 1991–1992: Ilves
- * Club domestic league appearances and goals

John "Ian" Crawford Jr. (14 July 1934 – 30 November 2007) was a Scottish football player and coach, who most prominently played for Heart of Midlothian in the late 1950s. He scored two goals as Hearts won the 1956 Scottish Cup Final, the club's first Scottish Cup win in 50 years.

== Career ==
Crawford started his senior career with Hearts' Edinburgh derby rivals Hibernian, but did not make a league appearance for the Easter Road club, who enjoyed the services of the Famous Five at the time. After a spell with Hamilton Academical, Crawford joined Hearts in August 1954. He scored 58 goals in 127 league appearances as Hearts won two league championships and the Scottish Cup during his time at the club. He appeared in Hearts' debut game in Europe on 3 September 1958 against Standard Liège, scoring the club's first goal in European competition.

He was transferred to West Ham United for £10,000 in July 1961, where he played alongside Bobby Moore under the management of Ron Greenwood. Crawford later said that it was Greenwood's encouragement that led him to go into coaching, and he served both Everton and Arsenal in that capacity. He also played for both Scunthorpe United and Peterborough United before retiring as a player.

Crawford never played for Scotland at full international level, but did win one cap at under-23 level, scoring against England.

== Personal life ==
Though he was born John Crawford, he was more commonly known as Ian to avoid confusion with his father, who played for Hearts' rivals Hibernian and Dundee United prior to World War II.

Crawford died aged 73 at his home in Peterborough, England, on 30 November 2007.
