= Tam McKenzie =

Scottish footballer and manager (1922–1967)

Personal information
- Full name: Thomas F. McKenzie
- Date of birth: 5 November 1922
- Place of birth: Edinburgh, Scotland
- Date of death: November 1967 (aged 45)
- Place of death: Peterborough, England
- Position: Defender

Youth career
- Pentland Rovers
- Haddington Athletic

Senior career*
Years	Team	Apps	(Gls)
1942–1959	Hearts	255	(3)
1959–1960	Wisbech Town		
1960–????	March Town		
1962–1965	Parson Drove		

Managerial career
- 1960–???: March Town
- * Club domestic league appearances and goals

Thomas F. McKenzie (5 November 1922 – November 1967) was a Scottish professional footballer who spent most of his career with Heart of Midlothian.

== Heart of Midlothian ==
McKenzie was born in Edinburgh and joined Hearts from Haddington Athletic in 1942 as a centre-half, having initially played as a centre forward as a juvenile with Pentland Rovers. After only one appearance for the Hearts team in the Wartime League, he left for Arakan, where he served in The Royal Scots during the Second World War.

McKenzie returned to Edinburgh at the war's conclusion and established himself in Hearts first team as a left back. He formed a lengthy full back partnership with Bobby Parker who joined in April 1947. Renowned for his strength and tackling skill, McKenzie enjoyed particular success in his personal battles against one of Scotland's most famous right wingers of the time, Hibernian's Gordon Smith. Despite Hibs enjoying great success in the late 1940s and early 1950s, with McKenzie's effective shackling of Smith ensuring that Hearts enjoyed the upper hand in Edinburgh derby matches of the era.

McKenzie captained Hearts during the 1949-50 season. He later saw off the challenge of Jock Adie to retain his place for the 1956 Scottish Cup Final victory. He eventually lost his place in the side to the emerging George Thomson during the 1957-58 season but he made enough appearances to collect a winners medal, as Hearts won the League title for the first time since 1897.

His final first team game for Hearts was on 30 October 1958. The 3-3 friendly draw at home against the South Africa XI (one week before his 36th birthday) was his only first team game that season. McKenzie left Hearts at the age of 36 at the end of the 1959 season. In total he made 351 competitive first team appearances (scoring five goals) as well 43 non-competitive matches (scoring 4 goals). Thus in total he played 394 Hearts first team games, scoring nine goals.

== Time in England ==
McKenzie moved south to Wisbech Town at the age of 36 playing one season with the Southern Football League club. He then moved to March Town as player-manager. He was still domiciled in England when he died in November 1967, as the result of a car accident. He was 45.

== Legacy ==
His son David would later play League football with Meadowbank Thistle in the 1970s.
