= Jimmy Murray (footballer, born 1933) =

Scottish footballer (1933–2015)

Personal information
- Full name: James Murray
- Date of birth: 4 February 1933
- Place of birth: Edinburgh, Scotland
- Date of death: 10 July 2015 (aged 82)
- Place of death: Edinburgh, Scotland
- Position: Inside forward

Youth career
- Merchiston Thistle

Senior career*
Years	Team	Apps	(Gls)
1951–1953	Heart of Midlothian	1	(1)
1953–1954	Reading	7	(3)
1954–1961	Heart of Midlothian	114	(62)
1961–1962	Falkirk	14	(4)
1962–1964	Clyde	32	(1)
1964–1965	Raith Rovers	14	(4)
Total		182	(75)

International career
1958	SFL trial v SFA	1	(0)
1958	Scotland	5	(1)
- * Club domestic league appearances and goals

James Murray (4 February 1933 – 10 July 2015) was a Scottish footballer. He played as an inside right for Heart of Midlothian and Scotland in the 1950s and early 1960s.

Murray made his first Scotland appearance in a 4–0 defeat to England at Hampden on 19 April 1958. He scored Scotland's first-ever goal in a World Cup finals match, in a 1–1 draw against Yugoslavia in 1958. He is also to this day the only Heart of Midlothian player to score a goal in the World Cup finals.

He won a total of five caps for Scotland. He also played for Reading, Falkirk, Clyde and Raith Rovers.
