= Bobby Parker (footballer, born 1925) =

Scottish footballer (1925–1997)

Bobby Parker (16 February 1925 – 1 March 1997) was a Scottish footballer. Parker played for Partick Thistle and most notably for Hearts.

== Heart of Midlothian ==
Parker was signed at the age of 22 by Hearts manager Davie McLean on 5 April 1947. He debuted the season after on 16 August 1947 in a 3-2 Scottish League Cup section game 3–2 defeat away to Airdrieonians.

His last first team appearance was that season on 23 November 1957 in a 2–1 defeat away to Clyde.

After retiring as a player he joined the Hearts back room team coaching the reserves. He then joined the Heart's board of directors in which he also had a spell as chairman.

Parker died on 1 March 1997, two weeks after his 72nd birthday.
