= Alfie Conn Sr. =

Scottish footballer (1926–2009)

Alfie Conn
Personal information
- Full name: Alfred Conn
- Date of birth: 2 October 1926
- Place of birth: Prestonpans, East Lothian, Scotland
- Date of death: 7 January 2009 (aged 82)
- Place of death: Glenrothes, Fife, Scotland
- Height: 5 ft 7 in (1.70 m)
- Position: Inside forward

Youth career
- Prestonpans YMCA
- Inveresk Athletic

Senior career*
Years	Team	Apps	(Gls)
1944–1958	Hearts	223	(115)
1958–1960	Raith Rovers	34	(15)

International career
1948–1955	Scottish League XI	3	(2)
1956	Scotland	1	(1)
- 1960–1962: Gala Fairydean
- 1962–1963: Raith Rovers
- * Club domestic league appearances and goals

Alfred "Alfie" Conn (2 October 1926 – 7 January 2009) was a Scottish professional footballer who played as an inside forward. He is most commonly remembered as part of the Terrible Trio of the Heart of Midlothian side of the 1950s, along with Willie Bauld and Jimmy Wardhaugh.

== Heart of Midlothian ==
Conn was born in Prestonpans, East Lothian. He joined Hearts from Inveresk Athletic in 1944, making his debut later that year in a 4–0 win over Dumbarton in a wartime Southern League match. He established himself in the first team in the 1948–49 season, when first combined with Bauld and Wardhaugh. Conn's energetic, tenacious style and powerful shooting complemented the cerebral play of Bauld and the dribbling skills of Wardhaugh. Their first match as a forward trio resulted in a 6–1 victory over East Fife. The Terrible Trio continued to score freely in the following 5 seasons, Conn notching 102 goals. Hearts became regular top four finishers yet defensive inconsistency ensured they failed to collect any silverware.

Conn eventually won his first medal in the 1954–55 season, when Hearts defeated Motherwell 4–2 in the 1954 Scottish League Cup Final. The following season, Conn scored as Hearts defeated Celtic 3–1 in the 1956 Scottish Cup Final, their first triumph in that competition for 50 years. He ended that 1955-56 season at the peak of his powers aged 29 with a career best 29 goals from 41 games.

Two weeks after the cup win, Conn attained his only Scotland cap on 2 May 1956 at Hampden Park. He put his side ahead after 12 minutes in a 1–1 draw with Austria.

Conn suffered a serious ankle injury and was to never be the same player again. In the league he made only 10 appearances in 1956-57 and only five when Hearts won the League in 1957–58.

He scored 221 goals in 408 games for Hearts.

== Raith Rovers ==
Conn transferred to Raith Rovers in search of regular first team football. Over two seasons, he scored 15 times in the 34 league games he played. He retired from playing in 1960.

== After playing ==
Conn had a brief spell as manager of both Gala Fairydean and Raith Rovers. Conn watched his son, Alfie Conn Jr., establish a successful footballing career of his own, notably with both Rangers and Celtic. Conn Sr. died on 7 January 2009, at the age of 82.
