= Willie Bauld =

Scottish footballer (1928–1977)

Personal information
- Full name: William Russell Logan Bauld
- Date of birth: 24 January 1928
- Place of birth: Newcraighall, Edinburgh, Scotland
- Date of death: 11 March 1977 (aged 49)
- Position: Striker

Youth career
- –1946: Newtongrange Star
- 1946: Musselburgh Athletic

Senior career*
Years	Team	Apps	(Gls)
1946–1962	Heart of Midlothian	292	(183)
- → Edinburgh City (loan)

International career
1950	Scotland	3	(2)
1949–1958	Scottish League XI	13	(15)
- * Club domestic league appearances and goals

William Russell Logan Bauld (24 January 1928 – 11 March 1977) was a footballer who played for Newtongrange Star, Heart of Midlothian, Edinburgh City and the Scotland national team.

== Club career ==
Bauld was born in Newcraighall, Edinburgh and joined Heart of Midlothian from junior side Newtongrange Star in 1946 and was immediately loaned to Edinburgh City. Upon his return, he made an immediate impact, scoring a hat-trick on his debut for the first-team. He, along with striking team-mates Alfie Conn and Jimmy Wardhaugh, became known as the Terrible Trio. He helped Hearts to a Scottish Cup triumph in 1956, the League Championship in 1957–58 and 1959–60 and League Cup successes in 1955 and 1959.

He scored 355 goals in 510 Hearts games.

== International career ==
Bauld was capped three times by Scotland, all in 1950, scoring two goals. He also scored 15 goals in 13 appearances for the Scottish League XI.

== Career statistics ==
Appearances and goals by national team and year
National team	Year	Apps	Goals
Scotland	1950	3	2
Total		3	2

Scores and results list Scotland's goal tally first, score column indicates score after each Bauld goal.

List of international goals scored by Willie Bauld
No.	Date	Venue	Opponent	Score	Result	Competition	Ref.
1	26 April 1950	Hampden Park, Glasgow	Switzerland	1–0	3–1	Friendly	
2	21 May 1950	Estádio Nacional, Lisbon	Portugal	1–1	2–2	Friendly match	
