= Lord Provost of Glasgow Charity Cup =

1952 football match in Scotland

1952 Lord Provost of Glasgow Charity Cup
- Event: Lord Provost of Glasgow Charity Cup
Hibernian	Motherwell
1	5
- Date: 22 September 1952
- Venue: Firhill Park, Glasgow
- Referee: Jack Mowat (Lanarkshire)
- Attendance: 10,829

The Lord Provost of Glasgow Charity Cup, also called the John McLeod Trophy, was a super cup match between Division One champions Hibernian and Scottish Cup winners Motherwell.

== Match ==
=== Team selection ===
Hibernian were without Tommy Younger, Jock Paterson, Lawrie Reilly, and Willie Ormond.

Paterson, Reilly, and Ormond were selected for the Scottish League XI to play the Welsh League XI in Cardiff on 24 September, while Wilson Humphries of Motherwell (a late replacement for Derek Grierson of Rangers) was also called up, but all of them were denied permission by the Scottish Football League to be released for the game.

=== Match details ===
22 September 1952
18:00 BST.

Hibernian	1–5	Motherwell
McDonald		Dawson; Kelly; Forrest; Sloan; Aitkenhead

Firhill Park, Glasgow
Attendance: 10,829

GK	(Scotland) Jimmy McCracken
FB	(Scotland) Jock Govan
FB	(Scotland) Hugh Howie
WH	(Scotland) Archie Buchanan
CH	(Scotland) Mackenzie
HB	(Republic of Ireland) Mike Gallagher
MF	(Scotland) Tommy McDonald
IF	(Scotland) Bobby Johnstone
CF	(Scotland) Jim Souness
IF	(Scotland) Eddie Turnbull
MF	(Scotland) Gordon Smith
Manager:
(Scotland) Hugh Shaw

GK	(Scotland) John Johnston
FB	(Scotland) Willie Kilmarnock
FB	(Scotland) Archie Shaw
RH	(Scotland) Charlie Cox
LH	(Scotland) Andy Paton
OR	(Scotland) Willie Redpath
IF	(Scotland) Tommy Sloan
CF	(Scotland) George Dawson
IF	(Scotland) Archie Kelly
OL	(Scotland) Jim Forrest
CH	(Scotland) Johnny Aitkenhead
Manager:
(Scotland) George Stevenson

== Afterwards ==
The trophy and mementoes for the players were presented by Mr T.A. Kerr, the Lord Provost of Glasgow, at the end of the match.

Hibernian faced Motherwell again five days later on 27 September in the Scottish Football League and gained a measure of revenge with a 7–3 victory at Fir Park. Lawrie Reilly and Jock Paterson were restored to the Hibs line up. Reilly netted four times for the Hibees.

== See also ==
- 1952 FA Charity Shield
- 1952 Copa Eva Duarte
- 1952 Cypriot Super Cup
- 1952 Campeón de Campeones
