= 1950 Scottish League Cup final =

- Event: 1950–51 Scottish League Cup
Hibernian	Motherwell
0	3
- Date: 28 October 1950
- Venue: Hampden Park, Glasgow
- Attendance: 64,074

The 1950 Scottish League Cup final was played on 28 October 1950, at Hampden Park in Glasgow and was the final of the fifth Scottish League Cup competition. The final was contested by Hibernian and Motherwell. Motherwell won the match 3–0 thanks to goals by Jim Forrest, Archie Kelly and Willie Watters.

== Background ==
Hibs had been 2/5 favourites to win the match and fielded seven full internationals in their side. This match was played during Hibs' most successful era, as they went on to win the league championship by ten clear points, led by the Famous Five forward line of Smith, Johnstone, Reilly, Turnbull and Ormond. They suffered a blow in the build-up to the final, however, as Eddie Turnbull was injured. Manager Hugh Shaw moved Willie Ormond from the left wing to inside left, and selected Jimmy Bradley in Ormond's normal position. Bradley, who never played in a league match for Hibs, froze on the big occasion.

== Match report ==
Hibs controlled most of the match, but without threatening the Motherwell goal much, prompting one journalist to report that:

if the Ibrox defence is the Iron Curtain then this Motherwell defence is compressed steel.

In the 74th minute, Tommy Younger could only parry a shot by Archie Kelly, who headed in the rebound to score the opening goal. Two minutes later, a deep cross by Archie Shaw was headed back across by Willie Watters, and Forrest headed in Motherwell's second goal. The third goal came when Younger miskicked a clearance into the path of Watters, who lobbed the Hibs' keeper. Younger had to be consoled by his opposite number after the game, while the Motherwell players celebrated their victory.

=== Match details ===
28 October 1950

Motherwell	3–0	Hibernian
Forrest 74'; Kelly 76'; Watters

Hampden Park, Glasgow
Attendance: 64,074

MOTHERWELL :
GK	John Johnston
FB	Willie Kilmarnock (c)
FB	Archie Shaw
RH	Don McLeod
CH	Andy Paton
LH	Willie Redpath
RW	Willie Watters
IF	Jim Forrest
CF	Archie Kelly
IF	Jimmy Watson
LW	Johnny Aitkenhead
Manager:
George Stevenson

HIBERNIAN :
GK	Tommy Younger
FB	Jock Govan
FB	John Ogilvie
RH	Archie Buchanan
CH	Jock Paterson
LH	Bobby Combe
RW	Gordon Smith (c)
IF	Bobby Johnstone
CF	Lawrie Reilly
IF	Willie Ormond
LW	Jimmy Bradley
Manager:
Hugh Shaw
