= 1950–51 Scottish Cup =

Tournament details
- Country: Scotland

Final positions
- Champions: Celtic
- Runners-up: Motherwell

The 1950–51 Scottish Cup was the 66th staging of Scotland's most prestigious football knockout competition. The Cup was won by Celtic who defeated Motherwell in the final.

== First round ==
Home team	Score	Away team
Aberdeen	6 – 1	Inverness Caledonian
Albion Rovers	1 – 1	Stenhousemuir
Alloa Athletic	2 – 3	Hearts
Brechin City	3 – 2	Berwick Rangers
Dumbarton	0 – 2	St Johnstone
Dundee	2 – 2	Dundee United
Dunfermline Athletic	0 – 3	Clyde
Duns	3 – 1	Forres Mechanics
East Fife	2 – 2	Celtic
East Stirlingshire	2 – 1	Kilmarnock
Falkirk	0 – 2	Airdrieonians
Hamilton Academical	2 – 2	Elgin City
Greenock Morton	2 – 2	Cowdenbeath
Partick Thistle	1 – 1	Raith Rovers
Peterhead	0 – 4	Motherwell
Queen's Park	3 – 1	Arbroath
Rangers	2 – 0	Queen of the South
St Mirren	1 – 1	Hibernian
Stirling Albion	1 – 2	Ayr United
Third Lanark	5 – 2	Forfar Athletic

=== Replays ===
Home team	Score	Away team
Celtic	4 – 2	East Fife
Cowdenbeath	1 – 2	Greenock Morton
Dundee United	0 – 1	Dundee
Elgin City	0 – 3	Hamilton Academical
Hibernian	5 – 0	St Mirren
Raith Rovers	1 – 0	Partick Thistle
Stenhousemuir	1 – 2	Albion Rovers

== Second round ==
Home team	Score	Away team
Aberdeen	4 – 0	Third Lanark
Albion Rovers	0 – 2	Clyde
Celtic	4 – 0	Duns
East Stirlingshire	1 – 5	Hearts
Greenock Morton	3 – 3	Airdrieonians
Motherwell	4 – 1	Hamilton Academical
Queen's Park	1 – 3	Ayr United
Raith Rovers	5 – 2	Brechin City
Rangers	2 – 3	Hibernian
St Johnstone	1 – 3	Dundee

=== Replays ===
Home team	Score	Away team
Airdrieonians	2 – 1	Greenock Morton

== Third round ==
Home team	Score	Away team
Airdrieonians	4 – 0	Clyde
Hearts	1 – 2	Celtic

== Quarter-finals ==
Home team	Score	Away team
Airdrieonians	0 – 3	Hibernian
Ayr United	2 – 2	Motherwell
Celtic	3 – 0	Aberdeen
Dundee	1 – 2	Raith Rovers

=== Replays ===
Home team	Score	Away team
Motherwell	2 – 1	Ayr United

== Semi-finals ==
31 March 1951

Celtic	3–2	Raith Rovers

Hampden Park, Glasgow
Attendance: 84,327

31 March 1951

Motherwell	3–2	Hibernian

Tynecastle Stadium, Edinburgh
Attendance: 46,000

== Final ==
21 April 1951

Celtic	1–0	Motherwell
McPhail	Soccerbase

Hampden Park, Glasgow
Attendance: 131,943
Referee: Jack Mowat

=== Teams ===
CELTIC:
GK	(Scotland) George Hunter
RB	(Republic of Ireland) Sean Fallon
LB	(Scotland) Alex Rollo
RH	(Scotland) Bobby Evans
CH	(Scotland) Alec Boden
LH	(Scotland) Joe Baillie
RW	(Scotland) Jock Weir
IR	(Scotland) Bobby Collins
CF	(Scotland) John McPhail
IL	(Northern Ireland) Bertie Peacock
LW	(Northern Ireland) Charlie Tully
Manager:
(Scotland) Jimmy McGrory

MOTHERWELL:
GK	(Scotland) John Johnston
RB	(Scotland) Willie Kilmarnock
LB	(Scotland) Archie Shaw
RH	(Scotland) Don McLeod
CH	(Scotland) Andy Paton
LH	(Scotland) Willie Redpath
RW	(Scotland) Wilson Humphries
IR	(Scotland) Jim Forrest
CF	(Scotland) Archie Kelly
IL	(Scotland) Jimmy Watson
LW	(Scotland) Johnny Aitkenhead
Manager:
(Scotland) George Stevenson

== See also ==
- 1950–51 in Scottish football
- 1950–51 Scottish League Cup
