= 1952 Scottish Cup final =

- Event: 1951–52 Scottish Cup
Motherwell	Dundee
4	0
- Date: 19 April 1952
- Venue: Hampden Park, Glasgow
- Referee: Jack Mowat
- Attendance: 136,274

The 1952 Scottish Cup final was played on 19 April 1952, at Hampden Park in Glasgow and was the final of the 67th Scottish Cup competition. The final was contested by Dundee and Motherwell. Motherwell won the match 4–0 thanks to goals by Jimmy Watson, Willie Redpath, Wilson Humphries and Archie Kelly.

The attendance of 136,274 is a Scottish record for a match not involving Celtic, Rangers or the Scotland national team.

== Final ==
19 April 1952

Motherwell	4 – 0	Dundee
Watson; Redpath; Humphries; Kelly	Soccerbase

Hampden Park, Glasgow
Attendance: 136,274
Referee: Jack Mowat

=== Teams ===
MOTHERWELL:
GK	(Scotland) John Johnston
RB	(Scotland) Willie Kilmarnock
LB	(Scotland) Archie Shaw
RH	(Scotland) Charlie Cox
CH	(Scotland) Andy Paton
LH	(Scotland) Willie Redpath
RW	(Scotland) Tommy Sloan
IR	(Scotland) Wilson Humphries
CF	(Scotland) Archie Kelly
IL	(Scotland) Jimmy Watson
LW	(Scotland) Johnny Aitkenhead
Manager:
(Scotland) George Stevenson

DUNDEE:
GK	(Scotland) Bobby Henderson
RB	(Scotland) Gerry Follon
LB	(Canada) Jack Cowan
RH	(Scotland) Tommy Gallacher
CH	(Scotland) Doug Cowie
LH	(Scotland) Alfie Boyd
RW	(Scotland) George Hill
IR	(Scotland) Johnny Pattillo
CF	(Scotland) Bobby Flavell
IL	(Scotland) Billy Steel
LW	(Scotland) George Christie
Manager:
(Scotland) George Anderson

== See also ==
- 1951–52 in Scottish football
