= 1944–45 Southern League Cup (Scotland) =

Scottish football tournament

The 1944–45 Southern League Cup was the fifth edition of the regional war-time football tournament.

== Group stage ==
=== Group A ===
Team	Pld	W	D	L	GF	GA	GD	Pts
Rangers	6	5	1	0	14	5	+9	11
Hibernian	6	2	2	2	14	8	+6	6
Third Lanark	6	2	1	3	11	15	+4	5
Albion Rovers	6	0	3	3	9	20	−11	3

=== Group B ===
Team	Pld	W	D	L	GF	GA	GD	Pts
Falkirk	6	5	0	1	14	7	+7	10
Celtic	6	2	2	2	6	6	0	6
Clyde	6	1	2	3	9	11	−2	4
Partick Thistle	6	2	0	4	7	12	−5	4

=== Group C ===
Team	Pld	W	D	L	GF	GA	GD	Pts
Queen's Park	6	5	1	0	20	6	+14	11
Morton	6	3	2	1	19	13	+6	8
Hamilton Academical	6	1	2	3	11	15	−3	4
Airdrieonians	6	0	1	5	5	21	−16	1

=== Group D ===
Team	Pld	W	D	L	GF	GA	GD	Pts
Motherwell	6	5	1	0	17	7	+10	11
Heart of Midlothian	6	3	2	1	12	7	+5	8
Dumbarton	6	1	2	3	11	14	−3	4
St Mirren	6	1	0	5	6	16	−10	2

== Semi-finals ==
Rangers	3 – 0	Queen's Park	Hampden Park, Glasgow
Motherwell	1 – 0	Falkirk	Hampden Park, Glasgow

== Final ==
12 May 1945

Motherwell	1–2	Rangers
Watson 28'		Gillick 39'; Venters 58'

Hampden Park, Glasgow
Attendance: 69,879

=== Teams ===
Motherwell:
GK	John Johnston
RB	Willie Kilmarnock
LB	Archie Shaw
RH	Alex Millar
CH	Andy Paton
LH	Sammy Ross
OR	Alec Gibson
IR	Jimmy Watson
CF	Davie Mathie
IL	George Gillan
OL	Johnny McCulloch

Rangers:
GK	George Jenkins
RB	George Young
LB	Jock Shaw
RH	Adam Little
CH	Willie Woodburn
LH	Scot Symon
OR	Willie Waddell
IR	Torry Gillick
CF	Jimmy Smith
IL	Alex Venters
OL	Charlie Johnston
