= John Ogilvie (footballer) =

Scottish footballer (1928–2020)

Personal information
- Full name: John Forest Ogilvie
- Date of birth: 28 October 1928
- Place of birth: Motherwell, Scotland
- Date of death: 2 May 2020 (aged 91)
- Place of death: Leicester, England
- Position: Left back

Youth career
- ????–1948: Thorniewood United

Senior career*
Years	Team	Apps	(Gls)
1948–1955	Hibernian	35	(0)
1955–1960	Leicester City	82	(2)
1960–1961	Mansfield Town	24	(1)
1961–????	Bedworth Town		
Total		141	(3)
- * Club domestic league appearances and goals

John Forest Ogilvie (28 October 1928 – 2 May 2020) was a Scottish footballer. Ogilvie played for Hibernian, Leicester City and Mansfield Town.

== Career ==
Ogilvie worked as a joiner while playing junior football for Thorniewood United. He started his senior career when he joined Hibernian, and made his league debut in December 1948. He played for Hibs in their most successful era, as their "Famous Five" forward line won three Scottish league championships. Ogilvie made 35 league appearances in six seasons with the Hibs first team. Most of those (23) were in their league championship in 1950–51. His career was severely impacted when he suffered a broken leg while playing in a 1950–51 Scottish Cup semi-final. He did not play for over two years due to the injury, and only made one more appearance for Hibs (a league match against Rangers in April 1954).

He then had trials with Sheffield United, but signed instead for Leicester City (managed by Dave Halliday) in October 1955. He was a key player as Leicester were promoted as Second Division champions in 1957. Ogilvie made 82 league appearances and scored twice for Leicester.

Ogilvie moved to Mansfield Town in January 1960. In two seasons at Mansfield he played in 24 first team league games during which he scored once. After a spell with non-league club Bedworth Town, he retired from playing football.

== Later life and death ==
Following his retirement from playing football, Ogilvie lived in Leicester and worked in the knitwear and printing industries. He also maintained some involvement in football, earning a FA coaching badge and doing some scouting work for Leicester City manager Jock Wallace.

After he contracted COVID-19 at a care home in Leicester during the COVID-19 pandemic in England, Ogilvie died on 2 May 2020, aged 91. He was survived by his wife Doreen, and two granddaughters.
