= List of Motherwell F.C. managers =

Motherwell Football Club is an association football club from Motherwell, North Lanarkshire, Scotland. They were established on 10 May 1886 following a merger between Glencairn and Alpha. They play their home games at Fir Park Stadium.

This is an official list of the managers who have managed Motherwell, and the success that they have achieved, since 1911. Before that year, a committee was involved in the management of the club. The Club's first ever manager was John 'Sailor' Hunter, who would go on to become the club's longest-serving manager. It was during his tenure that Motherwell won their first, and to date, only Premier League title, in the 1931-32 season. This was the same year that The Steelmen had their greatest ever team, scoring a record 119 league goals in one season.

George Stevenson, who succeeded Hunter as Motherwell manager, is the club's most successful manager, winning the League Cup and Scottish Cup in 9 years at Fir Park.

== Managerial Performances in the League ==
The following lists are broken down into the level of league that Motherwell were in at the time they were league winners or runners-up. In recent times up till now, the Scottish Premier League would be classed as the 1st tier of the Scottish football league system while the Scottish First Division would be classed as the 2nd, instead of the first as had been the case.

- First tier

Manager	Winner	Runner-up
John 'Sailor' Hunter	1 (1931–32)	4 (1926-27, 1929-30, 1932-33, 1933-34)
Alex McLeish	0	1 (1994-95)
Stuart McCall	0	2 (2012-13, 2013-14)

- Second tier

Manager	Winner	Runner-up
George Stevenson	1 (1953–54)	0
Bobby Howitt	1 (1968–69)	0
David Hay	1 (1981–82)	0
Tommy McLean	1 (1985–86)	0

== Managerial Performances in Domestic Cup Competitions ==
The following lists documents Motherwell's success in the two premier cup competitions in Scotland, the Scottish Cup and the Scottish League Cup, as per manager.

- Scottish Cup

Manager	Winner	Runner-up
John 'Sailor' Hunter	0	3 (1930-31, 1932-33, 1938-39)
George Stevenson	1 (1951-52)	1 (1950-51)
Tommy McLean	1 (1990-91)	0
Stuart McCall	0	1 (2010-11)
Steve Robinson	0	1 (2017-18)

- Scottish League Cup

Manager	Winner	Runner-up
George Stevenson	1 (1950-51)	1 (1954-55)
Terry Butcher	0	1 (2004-05)
Steve Robinson	0	1 (2017-18)

== Managerial Statistics in the League ==
Below is the full Scottish league record of every Motherwell manager. Only league games are stated. (Note: Caretaker managers are in Italics)

As of match played 7 November 2026 (Note: All records are from Soccerbase and http://www.londonhearts.com.)

Name	From	To	Played	Won	Drew	Lost	Goals For	Goals Against	Win%
(Scotland) John Hunter (Note: Does not include the emergency games played as a result of the Second World War.)	1911	1946	1064	507	226	331	2073	1558	47.65
(Scotland) George Stevenson	1946	1955	270	108	43	119	517	515	40.00
(Scotland) Bobby Ancell	1955	1965	340	130	84	126	538	601	38.24
(Scotland) Bobby Howitt	1965	1972	249	95	55	101	416	394	38.15
(Scotland) Ian St. John	1972	1975	83	37	17	39	123	126	44.56
(Scotland) Willie McLean	1975	1978	98	39	27	42	159	161	39.80
(Scotland) Roger Hynd	1978	1979	36	5	17	24	33	86	13.89
(Scotland) Ally MacLeod	1979	1981	78	35	22	21	124	99	44.87
(Scotland) David Hay	1981	1982	39	26	9	4	92	36	66.66
(Scotland) Jock Wallace, Jr.	1982	1983	36	11	5	20	39	73	30.56
(Scotland) Bobby Watson	1983	1984	36	4	7	25	31	75	11.11
(Scotland) Tommy McLean	1 June 1984	31 May 1994	403	123	111	169	450	528	30.52
(Scotland) Alex McLeish	13 July 1994	10 Feb 1998	134	38	39	55	122	144	28.36
(Finland) Harri Kampman	25 Feb 1998	4 Oct 1998	21	5	10	6	30	32	23.81
(Scotland) Billy Davies	14 Oct 1998	18 Sept 2001	108	34	28	55	137	162	31.48
(Scotland) John Philliben/ (Socialist Federal Republic of Yugoslavia) Miodrag Krivokapić	2001	2001	3	2	0	1	6	4	66.66
(Scotland) Eric Black	16 Oct 2001	30 June 2002	27	7	4	16	24	52	25.93
(England) Terry Butcher	24 April 2002	17 May 2006	154	47	36	71	192	232	30.52
(Scotland) Maurice Malpas	17 May 2006	30 June 2007	35	10	7	18	38	54	26.32
(Scotland) Mark McGhee	1 July 2007	12 June 2009	76	31	15	30	96	97	40.79
(Republic of Ireland) Jim Gannon	1 July 2009	28 Dec 2009	17	4	8	5	21	28	23.53
(Scotland) Craig Brown	29 Dec 2009	10 Dec 2010	35	16	8	11	52	42	45.14
(Scotland) Gordon Young	12 Dec 2010	30 Dec 2010	3	0	0	3	2	7	00.00
(Scotland) Stuart McCall	30 Dec 2010	2 November 2014	146	67	25	54	209	198	45.89
(Scotland) Kenny Black	2 November 2014	13 December 2014	4	1	1	2	4	6	25.00
(England) Ian Baraclough	13 December 2014	23 September 2015	32	11	5	21	33	47	34.38
(Northern Ireland) Stephen Craigan	23 September 2015	13 October 2015	2	1	0	1	3	3	50.00
(Scotland) Mark McGhee	13 October 2015	28 February 2017	54	18	10	26	69	103	33.34
(Northern Ireland) Steve Robinson	28 February 2017	31 December 2020	137	50	26	61	163	187	36.49
(Scotland) Graham Alexander	7 January 2021	29 July 2022	56	19	13	21	64	81	33.92
(Scotland) Steven Hammell	29 July 2022	11 August 2022	2	1	0	1	2	2	50
(Scotland) Steven Hammell	11 August 2022	11 February 2023	22	4	5	13	25	36	18.18
(Scotland) Stuart Kettlewell	11 February 2023	22 February 2022	2	2	0	0	4	1	100
(Scotland) Stuart Kettlewell	22 February 2023	27 January 2025	74	26	19	28	107	110	35.14
(Scotland) Stephen Frail	27 January 2025	17 February 2025	2	0	0	2	1	6	0
(Germany) Michael Wimmer	17 February 2025	23 May 2025	11	5	3	4	16	18	41.67
(Denmark) Jens Berthel Askou	12 June 2025	21 May 2026	38	16	13	9	59	36	42.11
(Sweden) Alfred Johansson	18 June 2026		13	3	4	6	15	21	23.08

== Sources ==
- Jeffrey, Jim; Fry, Genge (2001). The Men Who Made Motherwell Football Club. Tempus Publishing. ISBN 978-0-7524-2191-9.
- Wilson, Derek (2009). Motherwell FC Miscellany. Pitch Publishing. ISBN 978-1905411375.
