= 1951–52 Scottish Cup =

Tournament details
- Country: Scotland

Final positions
- Champions: Motherwell
- Runners-up: Dundee

The 1951–52 Scottish Cup was the 67th staging of Scotland's most prestigious football knockout competition. The Cup was won by Motherwell who defeated Dundee in the final.

== First round ==
Home team	Score	Away team
Berwick Rangers	7 – 0	Peebles Rovers
Brechin City	0 – 6	Queen of the South
Celtic	0 – 0	Third Lanark
Deveronvale	1 – 3	Clyde
Dundee	4 – 0	Ayr United
Duns	1 – 2	Alloa Athletic
Eyemouth United	0 – 4	East Fife
Forfar Athletic	2 – 4	Motherwell
Inverness Caledonian	3 – 3	Dundee United
Kilmarnock	2 – 0	Stenhousemuir
Montrose	1 – 2	Wigtown & Bladnoch
Greenock Morton	2 – 0	East Stirlingshire
Partick Thistle	0 – 1	Hamilton Academical
Raith Rovers	0 – 0	Hibernian

=== Replays ===
Home team	Score	Away team
Third Lanark	2 – 1	Celtic
Dundee United	4 – 0	Inverness Caledonian
Hibernian	0 – 0	Raith Rovers

==== Second Replays ====
Home team	Score	Away team
Raith Rovers	4 – 0	Hibernian

== Second round ==
Home team	Score	Away team
Aberdeen	2 – 1	Kilmarnock
Airdrieonians	2 – 1	East Fife
Albion Rovers	1 – 1	Stranraer
Alloa Athletic	0 – 0	Berwick Rangers
Clachnacuddin	1 – 2	Greenock Morton
Clyde	3 – 4	Dunfermline Athletic
Cowdenbeath	1 – 4	Arbroath
Dumbarton	1 – 0	Queen's Park
Falkirk	3 – 3	Stirling Albion
Hamilton Academical	1 – 1	Third Lanark
Hearts	1 – 0	Raith Rovers
Leith Athletic	1 – 4	Dundee United
Rangers	6 – 1	Elgin City
St Johnstone	2 – 2	Queen of the South
St Mirren	2 – 3	Motherwell
Wigtown & Bladnoch	1 – 7	Dundee

=== Replays ===
Home team	Score	Away team
Berwick Rangers	4 – 1	Alloa Athletic
Queen of the South	3 – 1	St Johnstone
Stirling Albion	1 – 2	Falkirk
Stranraer	3 – 4	Albion Rovers
Third Lanark	4 – 0	Hamilton Academical

== Third round ==
Home team	Score	Away team
Airdrieonians	4 – 0	Greenock Morton
Albion Rovers	1 – 3	Third Lanark
Arbroath	0 – 2	Rangers
Dumbarton	1 – 3	Falkirk
Dundee	1 – 0	Berwick Rangers
Dundee United	2 – 2	Aberdeen
Dunfermline Athletic	1 – 1	Motherwell
Queen of the South	1 – 3	Hearts

=== Replays ===
Home team	Score	Away team
Aberdeen	3 – 2	Dundee United
Motherwell	4 – 0	Dunfermline Athletic

== Quarter-finals ==
Home team	Score	Away team
Airdrieonians	2 – 2	Hearts
Dundee	4 – 0	Aberdeen
Rangers	1 – 1	Motherwell
Third Lanark	1 – 0	Falkirk

=== Replays ===
Home team	Score	Away team
Hearts	6 – 4	Airdrieonians
Motherwell	2 – 1	Rangers

== Semi-finals ==
29 March 1952

Dundee	2–0	Third Lanark

Easter Road, Edinburgh
Attendance: 23,615

29 March 1952

Motherwell	1–1	Hearts
Jimmy Watson		Alfie Conn

Hampden Park, Glasgow
Attendance: 98,547

=== Replays ===
7 April 1952

Motherwell	1–1 (a.e.t.)	Hearts
Jimmy Watson		Eddie Rutherford

Hampden Park, Glasgow
Attendance: 80,000

==== Second Replays ====
9 April 1952

Motherwell	3–1	Hearts
Archie Shaw; Wilson Humphries; Willie Redpath		Alfie Conn

Hampden Park, Glasgow
Attendance: 59,468

== Final ==
19 April 1952

Motherwell	4–0	Dundee
Watson; Redpath; Humphries; Kelly	Soccerbase

Hampden Park, Glasgow
Attendance: 136,274
Referee: Jack Mowat

== See also ==
- 1951–52 in Scottish football
- 1951–52 Scottish League Cup
