= 1931–32 Scottish Football League =

Scottish football season

Statistics of the Scottish Football League in season 1931–32.

== Scottish League Division One ==
| Pos | Team | Pld | W | D | L | GF | GA | GD | Pts |
|---|---|---|---|---|---|---|---|---|---|
| 1 | Motherwell | 38 | 30 | 6 | 2 | 119 | 31 | +88 | 66 |
| 2 | Rangers | 38 | 28 | 5 | 5 | 118 | 42 | +76 | 61 |
| 3 | Celtic | 38 | 20 | 8 | 10 | 94 | 50 | +44 | 48 |
| 4 | Third Lanark | 38 | 21 | 4 | 13 | 92 | 81 | +11 | 46 |
| 5 | St Mirren | 38 | 20 | 4 | 14 | 77 | 56 | +21 | 44 |
| 6 | Partick Thistle | 38 | 19 | 4 | 15 | 58 | 59 | −1 | 42 |
| 7 | Aberdeen | 38 | 16 | 9 | 13 | 57 | 49 | +8 | 41 |
| 8 | Heart of Midlothian | 38 | 17 | 5 | 16 | 63 | 61 | +2 | 39 |
| 9 | Kilmarnock | 38 | 16 | 7 | 15 | 68 | 70 | −2 | 39 |
| 10 | Hamilton Academical | 38 | 16 | 6 | 16 | 84 | 65 | +19 | 38 |
| 11 | Dundee | 38 | 14 | 10 | 14 | 61 | 72 | −11 | 38 |
| 12 | Cowdenbeath | 38 | 15 | 8 | 15 | 66 | 78 | −12 | 38 |
| 13 | Clyde | 38 | 13 | 9 | 16 | 58 | 70 | −12 | 35 |
| 14 | Airdrieonians | 38 | 13 | 6 | 19 | 74 | 81 | −7 | 32 |
| 15 | Morton | 38 | 12 | 7 | 19 | 78 | 87 | −9 | 31 |
| 16 | Queen's Park | 38 | 13 | 5 | 20 | 59 | 79 | −20 | 31 |
| 17 | Ayr United | 38 | 11 | 7 | 20 | 70 | 90 | −20 | 29 |
| 18 | Falkirk | 38 | 11 | 5 | 22 | 70 | 76 | −6 | 27 |
| 19 | Dundee United | 38 | 6 | 7 | 25 | 40 | 118 | −78 | 19 |
| 20 | Leith Athletic | 38 | 6 | 4 | 28 | 46 | 137 | −91 | 16 |

== Scottish League Division Two ==
| Pos | Team | Pld | W | D | L | GF | GA | GR | Pts | Promotion or relegation |
|---|---|---|---|---|---|---|---|---|---|---|
| 1 | East Stirlingshire (C, P) | 38 | 26 | 3 | 9 | 111 | 55 | 2.018 | 55 | Promotion to 1932–33 Scottish First Division |
| 2 | St Johnstone (P) | 38 | 24 | 7 | 7 | 102 | 52 | 1.962 | 55 | Promotion to 1932–33 Scottish First Division |
| 3 | Raith Rovers | 38 | 20 | 6 | 12 | 83 | 65 | 1.277 | 46 | |
| 4 | Stenhousemuir | 38 | 19 | 8 | 11 | 88 | 76 | 1.158 | 46 | |
| 5 | St Bernard's | 38 | 19 | 7 | 12 | 81 | 62 | 1.306 | 45 | |
| 6 | Forfar Athletic | 38 | 19 | 7 | 12 | 90 | 79 | 1.139 | 45 | |
| 7 | Hibernian | 38 | 18 | 8 | 12 | 73 | 52 | 1.404 | 44 | |
| 8 | East Fife | 38 | 18 | 5 | 15 | 107 | 77 | 1.390 | 41 | |
| 9 | Queen of the South | 38 | 18 | 5 | 15 | 99 | 91 | 1.088 | 41 | |
| 10 | Dunfermline Athletic | 38 | 17 | 6 | 15 | 78 | 73 | 1.068 | 40 | |
| 11 | Arbroath | 38 | 17 | 5 | 16 | 82 | 78 | 1.051 | 39 | |
| 12 | Dumbarton | 38 | 14 | 10 | 14 | 70 | 60 | 1.167 | 38 | |
| 13 | Alloa Athletic | 38 | 14 | 7 | 17 | 73 | 74 | 0.986 | 35 | |
| 14 | Bo'ness | 38 | 15 | 4 | 19 | 70 | 103 | 0.680 | 34 | |
| 15 | King's Park | 38 | 14 | 5 | 19 | 97 | 93 | 1.043 | 33 | |
| 16 | Albion Rovers | 38 | 13 | 2 | 23 | 81 | 104 | 0.779 | 28 | |
| 17 | Montrose | 38 | 11 | 6 | 21 | 60 | 96 | 0.625 | 28 | |
| 18 | Armadale | 38 | 10 | 5 | 23 | 68 | 102 | 0.667 | 25 | |
| 19 | Brechin City | 38 | 9 | 7 | 22 | 52 | 97 | 0.536 | 25 | |
| 20 | Edinburgh City | 38 | 5 | 7 | 26 | 78 | 146 | 0.534 | 17 | |

Source: statto.com
Rules for classification: 1) points; 2) goal ratio.
(C) Champions; (P) Promoted

== See also ==
- 1931–32 in Scottish football
