= Iron Curtain (football) =

Defensive line of Rangers F.C.

The Iron Curtain was the defensive line of Rangers F.C. during the late 1940s and early 1950s. The normal line-up in the early 1950s consisted of goalkeeper Bobby Brown, full backs George Young and Jock Shaw, centre half Willie Woodburn and wing halves Ian McColl and Sammy Cox. These positions refer to the old 3-2-5 formation, where the three defenders would mark the two opposing wingers and centre forward, while the wing-halves dealt with the opposing inside forwards. These direct match-ups meant that Rangers' Iron Curtain had several great confrontations with Hibs' Famous Five forward line of Gordon Smith, Bobby Johnstone, Lawrie Reilly, Eddie Turnbull and Willie Ormond.

The lineup in the mid-1940s of Jerry Dawson, Dougie Gray, Shaw, Scot Symon, Young and Cox was also commonly referred to as the Iron Curtain. This was done to the extent that most young people in Scotland would associate the term with Rangers, rather than the geopolitical situation.

== See also ==
- 1953–54 Port Vale F.C. season, manager Freddie Steele built a Port Vale team that was also referred to as an 'Iron Curtain' as they kept 30 league clean sheets on their way to the Football League Third Division North title and FA Cup semi-finals
