= Bobby Combe =

Scottish footballer

Personal information
- Full name: James Robert Combe
- Date of birth: 29 January 1924
- Place of birth: Leith, Edinburgh, Scotland
- Date of death: 19 January 1991 (aged 66)
- Height: 5 ft 7 in (1.70 m)
- Position: Wing half

Youth career
- Inveresk Athletic

Senior career*
| Years | Team | Apps | (Gls) |
| 1941–1957 | Hibernian | 263 | (53) |
| 1959–1960 | Dumbarton | 25 | (7) |
| Total | | 288 | (60) |

International career
| 1948 | Scotland | 3 | (1) |
| 1948–1954 | Scottish Football League XI | 3 | (0) |

Managerial career
- 1959–1960: Dumbarton
- * Club domestic league appearances and goals

James Robert Combe (29 January 1924 – 19 January 1991) was a Scottish footballer, who played for Hibernian and was player/manager of Dumbarton for one season. He also represented Scotland and the Scottish Football League XI.

A schoolboy internationalist, Combe joined his local club Hibernian at the age of 17 from Inveresk Athletic. He was originally an inside right but dropped back to the half back line upon the formation of the Hibs Famous Five forward line, his old position taken by Bobby Johnstone. Despite operating largely in the shadows of the "Five", Combe enjoyed a long and successful career. He won League winners medals in 1948, 1951 and 1952. He also won one Scottish League Cup runners-up medal.

Combe was also a Scotland internationalist, earning three caps in 1948. He made his debut in a 2–0 defeat by England and also appeared against Switzerland and Belgium that year, scoring against the latter. He was selected in Scotland's 22 man squad for the 1954 FIFA World Cup but the Scottish Football Association only budgeted to take 13 players (including only one goalkeeper) to the finals in Switzerland. Combe was one of the nine who did not travel, along with the likes of Ernie Copland and Jimmy Binning. Inside forward George Hamilton was also on reserve, but travelled after Bobby Johnstone withdrew through injury.

Combe retired from playing in 1957 and was appointed Hibernian's trainer. He held that role for two years before briefly becoming player-manager of Dumbarton. In his later years, Combe worked as a shopkeeper in his native Leith, then in the marketing department of Scottish Gas.
