= Jock Govan =

Scottish footballer (1923–1999)

Personal information
- Full name: John Govan
- Date of birth: 16 January 1923
- Place of birth: Larkhall, Scotland
- Date of death: 17 February 1999 (aged 76)
- Place of death: Leith, Scotland
- Height: 5 ft 11 in (1.80 m)
- Position: Full back

Youth career
- –1941: Larkhall Thistle

Senior career*
Years	Team	Apps	(Gls)
1941–1954	Hibernian	163	(0)
1954–1955	Ayr United	7	(0)

International career
1947–1948	Scotland	6	(0)
1948–1952	Scottish League XI	2	(0)
- * Club domestic league appearances and goals

John Govan (16 January 1923 – 17 February 1999) was a Scottish footballer, who played for Hibernian and Ayr United. Govan, who was a key part of the successful post-war Hibs side, was capped six times by Scotland.

Govan grew up in Larkhall, a Lanarkshire town noted for its support of Rangers. He played for the local junior club Larkhall Thistle until he was signed by Hibernian in 1941. This move upset the people in Larkhall, who burned his Hibs training kit. Govan was a full-back, but had an attacking style that was ahead of its time.

Govan broke into the Hibs first team in 1943, eventually forming a partnership with Davie Shaw. This partnership formed the basis of Hibs success after the Second World War, as they won the league championship in 1948. Although Shaw was eventually replaced due to age and injury, Govan continued to enjoy success with Hibs, winning the league again in 1951 and 1952. He was transferred to Ayr United in 1954, where he finished his playing career.

After retiring as a football player, Govan worked as a mining engineer and played lawn bowls in Midlothian. He died in Leith on 17 February 1999, at the age of 76, and was survived by his wife and two children.
