= 1950–51 British Home Championship =

Tournament details
- Host country: England, Ireland, Scotland and Wales
- Dates: 7 October 1950 – 14 April 1951
- Teams: 4

Final positions
- Champions: Scotland
- Runners-up: England

Tournament statistics
- Matches played: 6
- Goals scored: 30 (5 per match)
- Top scorer: (Scotland) Billy Steel (4 goals)

The 1950–51 British Home Championship football tournament was the Home Nations follow-up to England's disastrous appearance at their first World Cup, the 1950 FIFA World Cup in Brazil. There the much vaunted English had been beaten by the USA and Spain. The Scots had refused to go, and the Welsh and the Irish had failed to qualify. The Scots went on to capitalise on the demoralised English by taking the Home Championship away from them too.

The tournament began with wins for the favourites away from home, England beating the Irish and Scotland the Welsh. In the second matches, this dominance was emphasised with powerful wins by England in Sunderland over the Welsh and Scotland who beat the Irish 6–1 including four goals from Billy Steel. In the final game at Wembley Stadium, a tense and furious game brought the trophy to Scotland, who finished 3–2 winners. Wales had already beaten Ireland to claim third spot.

== Table ==
| Team | Pld | W | D | L | GF | GA | GD | Pts |
|---|---|---|---|---|---|---|---|---|
| Scotland (C) | 3 | 3 | 0 | 0 | 12 | 4 | +8 | 6 |
| England | 3 | 2 | 0 | 1 | 10 | 6 | +4 | 4 |
| Wales | 3 | 1 | 0 | 2 | 5 | 8 | −3 | 2 |
| Ireland | 3 | 0 | 0 | 3 | 3 | 12 | −9 | 0 |

Rules for classification: 1) points. The points system worked as follows: 2 points for a win and 1 point for a draw.
(C) Champions

== Results ==
7 October 1950

| Ireland | 1–4 | England |
|---|---|---|
| Edward McMorran | | Eddie Baily 2 Jack Lee; Billy Wright |

Windsor Park, Belfast

21 October 1950

| Wales | 1–3 | Scotland |
|---|---|---|
| Aubrey Powell 68' | | 23', 57' Lawrie Reilly; 72' Billy Liddell |

Ninian Park, Cardiff
Attendance: 60,000
Referee: Arthur Edward Ellis (England)

1 November 1950

| Scotland | 6–1 | Ireland |
|---|---|---|
| John McPhail 8', 13'; Billy Steel 53', 57', 66', 79' | | 43' Kevin McGarry |

Hampden Park, Glasgow
Attendance: 83,142
Referee: Benjamin Mervyn Griffiths (Wales)

15 November 1950

| England | 4–2 | Wales |
|---|---|---|
| Eddie Baily 2 Stan Mortensen; Jackie Milburn | | Trevor Ford 2' |

Roker Park, Sunderland
Referee: Jack Mowat (Scotland)

7 March 1951

| Ireland | 1–2 | Wales |
|---|---|---|
| Billy Simpson | | Roy Clarke 2' |

Windsor Park, Belfast

14 April 1951

| England | 2–3 | Scotland |
|---|---|---|
| Harold Hassall 26'; Tom Finney 63' | | 33' Bobby Johnstone; 48' Lawrie Reilly; 54' Billy Liddell |

Wembley Stadium, London
Attendance: 98,750
Referee: George Mitchell (Scotland)
