= Jimmy Bradley =

Scottish footballer

Personal information
- Full name: James Bradley
- Date of birth: 21 March 1927
- Place of birth: Greenock, Scotland
- Date of death: 26 November 2008 (aged 81)
- Place of death: New Jersey, United States
- Position: Left winger

Senior career*
Years	Team	Apps	(Gls)
1947–1950	Hibernian	0	(0)
1950–1952	Third Lanark	9	(2)
1952–1953	Shrewsbury Town	1	(0)
1953–1954	Headington United		
1954–1955	Gravesend & Northfleet		
1955–1956	Dumbarton	2	(1)
Total		12	(3)
- * Club domestic league appearances and goals

Jimmy Bradley (21 March 1927 – 26 November 2008) was a Scottish footballer, who played for Hibernian, Third Lanark, Shrewsbury Town, Headington United, Gravesend & Northfleet and Dumbarton. Bradley made only one first team appearance for Hibernian, where he played poorly in the 1950 Scottish League Cup Final defeat by Motherwell.
