= Alec Boden =

Scottish footballer

Personal information
- Date of birth: 13 August 1925
- Place of birth: Hardgate, Scotland
- Date of death: 24 January 2011 (aged 85)
- Position: Centre half

Youth career
- Duntocher St. Mary's B.G.

Senior career*
Years	Team	Apps	(Gls)
1943–1956	Celtic	122	(2)
1946–1947	→ Cowdenbeath (loan)	10	(0)
1956–1958	Ayr United	25	(3)
Total		157	(5)

International career
1952	Scottish League XI	1	(0)
- * Club domestic league appearances and goals

Alec Boden (13 August 1925 – 24 January 2011) was a Scottish footballer who played at centre-half, most notably for Celtic. He starred for Duntocher St. Mary's, a boys' guild team, before signing for Celtic in 1943. Called up for military service in November that year, he became a PT instructor in the British Army, where he was promoted to the rank of sergeant.

Boden spent a short time on loan to Cowdenbeath before returning to Celtic Park. His league debut however, was at right-back, in the second game of the 1947–48 season, a 4–0 home victory against Queen's Park. His only other league appearance that season was at right-half, in a 3–2 home win against Morton that October. He also made two appearances at full-back in the League Cup.

Boden suffered a broken knee-cap and had two pieces of cartilage removed during his playing career. He played in the club's 1951 Scottish Cup Final victory over Motherwell, but missed the 1956 final due to injury. Boden represented the Scottish League in September 1952. He joined Ayr United later in 1956, and received an English FA coaching certificate by passing the Lilleshall coaching course. Along with John Higgins, he coached the Celtic Reserves in the 1960s.

Boden died on 24 January 2011, aged 85.
