= Wallace Mercer =

Scottish football club executive (1946–2006)

Alexander Wallace Mercer (4 June 1946 – 17 January 2006) was chairman of the Scottish football club Heart of Midlothian from 1981 to 1994.

== Hearts ==
Mercer became chairman on 25 May 1981 when he bought a controlling interest in Hearts for £265,000. He is remembered mainly for improving the fortunes of Hearts during the early 1980s. This culminated in Hearts coming within 10 minutes of winning the championship in 1986.

Mercer is also remembered for his attempt in 1990 to merge the two major Edinburgh clubs, Hearts and Hibs. Mercer reasoned that the Old Firm had far greater financial power than either Edinburgh club and that the only way to realistically compete was with a united Edinburgh club. Hibs fans suspected that the "merger" was more of a takeover by Hearts and they strongly resisted Mercer's bid to acquire a majority share in Hibs. The fans of Hibernian did not take kindly to the threat of a takeover and Wallace received death threats and other various abuse. One supporter was apprehended outside Mercer's house with an axe. Mercer was eventually forced to abandon his plans as some key shareholders refused to sell to him, denying him the level of shareholding needed to liquidate Hibs. Sir Tom Farmer eventually took financial control of Hibs instead.

In 2010, Mercer's widow and children issued a statement to the Edinburgh Evening News reiterating the reasons for the proposed merger of Hearts and Hibs. The statement also claimed that the increased dominance of the Old Firm since 1990 had vindicated the proposal.

== Death ==
Mercer died of cancer on 17 January 2006. The timing of his death caused a point of controversy because Hearts' next home match was an Edinburgh derby against Hibs.
