= George Stevenson (footballer) =

Scottish footballer and manager

Personal information
- Full name: George Stevenson
- Date of birth: 4 April 1905
- Place of birth: Kilbirnie, Scotland
- Date of death: 1990 (aged 84–85)
- Place of death: Dingwall, Scotland
- Height: 1.75 m (5 ft 9 in)
- Position: Inside forward

Youth career
- –: Viewfield Rovers

Senior career*
Years	Team	Apps	(Gls)
–	Kilbirnie Ladeside		
1923–1939	Motherwell	510	(169)

International career
1927–1934	Scotland	12	(4)
1927–1934	Scottish League XI	10	(2)

Managerial career
- 1946–1955: Motherwell
- * Club domestic league appearances and goals

George Stevenson (4 April 1905 – 1990) was a Scottish footballer, featuring solely for Motherwell at senior club level and later managing them. As a player he was in the team which won the only League title in the club's history in 1932, played in three Scottish Cup finals, and was also a Scotland international. As Motherwell manager, he won both the Scottish Cup and the Scottish League Cup in the 1950s.

== Career ==
As a player, Stevenson was part of the Motherwell side that won the league championship in 1932, and he made 573 appearances for the club in total. Stevenson was selected 12 times by the Scotland national football team (more times than any other Motherwell player), scoring four goals. He also represented the Scottish League XI 10 times.

He became Motherwell's manager after the Second World War, and guided them to victory in the 1950 Scottish League Cup Final and the 1952 Scottish Cup Final as well as finishing runners-up in the 1951 Scottish Cup Final. Motherwell were relegated the following season, however, and despite bringing them straight back up to Division One and reaching the 1954 Scottish League Cup Final, Stevenson resigned in 1955 after another difficult season.

On 5 November 2019, it was announced that Stevenson was to be inducted into the Motherwell F.C. Hall of Fame.

== Personal life ==
His elder brother John was also a footballer, who in contrast to George had short spells at many clubs in Scotland and England. He was also born in a different country (Wigan in Lancashire, England) with the family settling in Ayrshire prior to George's birth in 1905.

== Honours ==
=== Player ===
Motherwell

- Scottish Football League: 1931–32
- Scottish Cup: runner-up 1930–31, 1932–33, 1938–39

=== Manager ===
Motherwell

- Scottish League Cup: 1950–51
  - runners-up 1954–55
- Scottish Cup: 1951–52
  - runners-up 1950–51
- Scottish League B: 1953–54

== See also ==
- List of footballers in Scotland by number of league appearances
- List of one-club men in association football
- List of Scottish Cup winning managers
