= Jimmy Watson (footballer, born 1924) =

Scottish footballer

Personal information
- Full name: James Watson
- Date of birth: 16 January 1924
- Place of birth: Plains, Lanarkshire, Scotland
- Date of death: 11 April 1996 (aged 72)
- Place of death: Dunfermline, Scotland
- Position: Inside forward

Senior career*
Years	Team	Apps	(Gls)
- Armadale Thistle
1946–1952	Motherwell	147	(48)
1952–1957	Huddersfield Town	140	(29)
1957–1959	Dunfermline Athletic	58	(31)
Total		345	(108)

International career
1947–1953	Scotland	2	(0)
1950	Scottish Football League XI	1	(1)
- * Club domestic league appearances and goals

James Watson (16 January 1924 – 11 April 1996) was a Scottish footballer who played as an inside forward for Armadale Thistle, Motherwell, Huddersfield Town and Dunfermline Athletic. He won the Scottish Cup with Motherwell in 1952, scoring in the 4–0 victory over Dundee (having also played in a defeat to Celtic in the previous year's final), and also claimed a winner's medal in the 1950–51 edition of the Scottish League Cup, a 3–0 win against the strong Hibernian team of the era.

Watson earned two caps for Scotland, both against Northern Ireland. He was also selected for the Scottish Football League XI.
