= Jock Paterson =

British footballer

Personal information
- Full name: John Paterson
- Date of birth: 1926
- Place of birth: Colchester, England
- Date of death: 2000 (aged 73–74)
- Position: Centre half

Youth career
- Penicuik Athletic

Senior career*
Years	Team	Apps	(Gls)
1948–1959	Hibernian	283	(0)
1959–1961	Ayr United	33	(0)
Total		316	(0)

International career
1952	Scottish League XI	1	(0)
- * Club domestic league appearances and goals

John "Jock" Paterson (1926 – 14 January 2000) was a British footballer, who played for Hibernian and Ayr United.

Paterson went three consecutive seasons without missing a league game for Hibs and he played in every game of the championship winning 1951–52 season. Paterson played for the Scottish Football League XI in the following season, in a 3–0 defeat by a Welsh select team. He was unable to play for the Scotland national football team due to his English birthplace.

His son, Craig Paterson, also played for Hibernian. Paterson died in January 2000; a moment's silence was observed in his memory at the next Hibs home match.
