= John Johnston (footballer, born 1921) =

Scottish footballer

Personal information
- Full name: John Wardlaw Johnston
- Date of birth: 10 September 1921
- Place of birth: Bo'ness, Scotland
- Date of death: 21 January 1989 (aged 67)
- Place of death: [Falkirk, Scotland
- Height: 5 ft 9 in (1.75 m)
- Position: Goalkeeper

Youth career
- Rangers

Senior career*
Years	Team	Apps	(Gls)
–	Armadale Thistle		
1941–1955	Motherwell	205	(0)
1955–1956	Hamilton Academical	5	(0)
Total		210	(0)
- * Club domestic league appearances and goals

John Wardlaw Johnston (10 September 1921 – 21 January 1989) was a Scottish footballer, who played as a goalkeeper for Motherwell and Hamilton Academical.

== Honours ==
Motherwell

- Scottish Cup: 1951–52; runner-up 1950–51
- Scottish League Cup: 1950–51
- Scottish Division Two: 1953–54
- Summer Cup: 1943–44
- Southern League Cup: runner-up 1944–45
- Lord Provost Trophy: 1952
