= Tommy Sloan (footballer, born 1925) =

Scottish footballer (1925–2010)

Personal information
- Date of birth: 13 October 1925
- Place of birth: Barrhead, Scotland
- Date of death: 13 January 2010 (aged 84)
- Height: 1.70 m (5 ft 7 in)
- Position: Right winger

Senior career*
Years	Team	Apps	(Gls)
1942–1946	Arthurlie		
1946–1951	Hearts	110	(24)
1951–1957	Motherwell	112	(35)
1957–1960	Gloucester City		
- * Club domestic league appearances and goals

Thomas Sloan (13 October 1925 – 13 January 2010) was a Scottish professional footballer who played as a right winger, most notable for being a member of the first Motherwell side to win the Scottish Cup, in 1951–52.

== Career ==
Born in Barrhead, Renfrewshire, Sloan joined local Junior side Arthurlie in 1942 and, after switching from centre forward to the right wing, became a regular in the first team. With the Second World War at its destructive zenith, many of Sloan's contemporaries enlisted in the British armed services to fight abroad. However, his work manufacturing munitions at the Shanks factory in Barrhead was considered a reserved occupation and he remained in Scotland. He would later work in the dockyards in Renfrew, another reserved occupation.

Sloan's performances with Arthurlie led to his selection for the Scotland Junior international side. They also attracted the attention of several League clubs and in 1945, after a dispute with the Arthurlie management, he signed for Hearts. He agreed, however, to stay with Arthurlie for the duration of their Scottish Junior Cup campaign, eventually helping them to the final, where they lost 2–0 to Fauldhouse United.

Sloan made his debut for Hearts in the 1946–47 season and quickly became a regular feature in the side. His supply from the right wing helped the burgeoning Terrible Trio inside forward combination of Conn, Bauld and Wardhaugh in their prolific scoring feats, while Sloan himself maintained a respectable scoring record.

The death of Hearts manager Davie McLean in February 1951 eventually led to Sloan's departure from Tynecastle. McLean's assistant, Tommy Walker, inherited the role of manager and, after an initial settling-in period, started to remould the side in his image. One of his first signings was veteran Rangers winger Eddie Rutherford and, for the first time in five seasons, Sloan found himself out of the first-team. In November 1951, Sloan and another displaced team-mate Charlie Cox joined Motherwell in a £6,500 joint transfer.

Within months of their move to Fir Park, the Scottish Cup draw afforded the opportunity for Sloan and Cox to play former club Hearts, in the semi-final at Hampden Park. After two close games were drawn 1–1, the pair enjoyed their revenge on former manager Walker as Motherwell won the second replay 3–1, reaching the final for the fourth time in their history. They had lost all three previous finals, to Celtic (twice) and Clyde, but Sloan helped the Steelmen overcome the weight of history to record a comfortable 4–0 win over Dundee.

Surprisingly, Motherwell suffered their first ever relegation the following year, although in an incredibly tight competition they finished only five points behind fourth-placed Hearts. Sloan stayed with the side despite their demotion, helping them win the Second Division title at the first attempt in 1953–54. He appeared in the Motherwell side that reached the 1954 Scottish League Cup final, but Hearts proved too strong on that occasion, winning 4–2.

Sloan eventually left Motherwell for English non-league side Gloucester City in 1957, where he stayed for three seasons. He returned to Scotland to coach old side Arthurlie in 1960 in his native Barrhead, concurrently returning to work in the town's Shanks factory.
