= 1931–32 in Scottish football =

Football in Scotland
- Season: 1931–32

Men's football
- Scottish Division One: Motherwell
- Scottish Division Two: East Stirlingshire
- Junior Cup winners: Glasgow Perthshire
- Scotland national team: 1932 BHC
- Scottish Cup: Rangers

The 1931–32 season was the 59th season of competitive football in Scotland and the 42nd season of the Scottish Football League.

== Scottish League Division One ==
Pos	Team	Pld	W	D	L	GF	GA	GD	Pts
1	Motherwell	38	30	6	2	119	31	+88	66
2	Rangers	38	28	5	5	118	42	+76	61
3	Celtic	38	20	8	10	94	50	+44	48
4	Third Lanark	38	21	4	13	92	81	+11	46
5	St Mirren	38	20	4	14	77	56	+21	44
6	Partick Thistle	38	19	4	15	58	59	−1	42
7	Aberdeen	38	16	9	13	57	49	+8	41
8	Heart of Midlothian	38	17	5	16	63	61	+2	39
9	Kilmarnock	38	16	7	15	68	70	−2	39
10	Hamilton Academical	38	16	6	16	84	65	+19	38
11	Dundee	38	14	10	14	61	72	−11	38
12	Cowdenbeath	38	15	8	15	66	78	−12	38
13	Clyde	38	13	9	16	58	70	−12	35
14	Airdrieonians	38	13	6	19	74	81	−7	32
15	Morton	38	12	7	19	78	87	−9	31
16	Queen's Park	38	13	5	20	59	79	−20	31
17	Ayr United	38	11	7	20	70	90	−20	29
18	Falkirk	38	11	5	22	70	76	−6	27
19	Dundee United	38	6	7	25	40	118	−78	19
20	Leith Athletic	38	6	4	28	46	137	−91	16

Champions: Motherwell
Relegated: Dundee United, Leith Athletic

== Scottish League Division Two ==
Pos	Team	Pld	W	D	L	GF	GA	GR	Pts	Promotion or relegation
1	East Stirlingshire (C, P)	38	26	3	9	111	55	2.018	55	Promotion to 1932–33 Scottish First Division
2	St Johnstone (P)	38	24	7	7	102	52	1.962	55	Promotion to 1932–33 Scottish First Division
3	Raith Rovers	38	20	6	12	83	65	1.277	46	
4	Stenhousemuir	38	19	8	11	88	76	1.158	46	
5	St Bernard's	38	19	7	12	81	62	1.306	45	
6	Forfar Athletic	38	19	7	12	90	79	1.139	45	
7	Hibernian	38	18	8	12	73	52	1.404	44	
8	East Fife	38	18	5	15	107	77	1.390	41	
9	Queen of the South	38	18	5	15	99	91	1.088	41	
10	Dunfermline Athletic	38	17	6	15	78	73	1.068	40	
11	Arbroath	38	17	5	16	82	78	1.051	39	
12	Dumbarton	38	14	10	14	70	60	1.167	38	
13	Alloa Athletic	38	14	7	17	73	74	0.986	35	
14	Bo'ness	38	15	4	19	70	103	0.680	34	
15	King's Park	38	14	5	19	97	93	1.043	33	
16	Albion Rovers	38	13	2	23	81	104	0.779	28	
17	Montrose	38	11	6	21	60	96	0.625	28	
18	Armadale	38	10	5	23	68	102	0.667	25	
19	Brechin City	38	9	7	22	52	97	0.536	25	
20	Edinburgh City	38	5	7	26	78	146	0.534	17	

Source: statto.com
Rules for classification: 1) points; 2) goal ratio.
(C) Champions; (P) Promoted

Promoted: East Stirlingshire, St. Johnstone

== Scottish Cup ==
Rangers were winners of the Scottish Cup after a 3–0 replay win over Kilmarnock.

== Other honours ==
=== National ===
Competition	Winner	Score	Runner-up
Scottish Qualifying Cup – North	Inverness Citadel	4–1	Murrayfield Amateurs
Scottish Qualifying Cup – South	Beith	6–1	Dalbeattie Star

=== County ===
Competition	Winner	Score	Runner-up
Aberdeenshire Cup	Aberdeen	11–3 *	Huntly
Dumbartonshire Cup	Dumbarton	8–3 *	Vale Ocaba
East of Scotland Shield	Hearts	5–1	St Bernard's
Fife Cup	East Fife	3–1	Cowdenbeath
Forfarshire Cup	Montrose	1–0	Dundee United
Glasgow Cup	Rangers	3–0	Queens Park
Lanarkshire Cup	Motherwell	5–4 *	Airdrie
Perthshire Cup	St Johnstone	9–0	Binham Rovers
Renfrewshire Cup	St Mirren	5–2 *	Morton
Southern Counties Cup	Stranraer		
Stirlingshire Cup	East Stirling	4–2	Stenhousemuir

^{*} – aggregate over two legs

=== Highland League ===
Top Three
Pos	Team	Pld	W	D	L	GF	GA	GD	Pts
1	Elgin City	26	16	6	4	71	25	+46	38
2	Keith	26	17	3	6	92	53	+39	37
3	Inverness Citadel	26	15	6	5	59	39	+20	36

== Junior Cup ==
Glasgow Perthshire were winners of the Junior Cup after a 2–1 win over Kirkintilloch Rob Roy in the final.

== Scotland national team ==
Date	Venue	Opponents	Score	Competition	Scotland scorer(s)
19 September 1931	Ibrox Park, Glasgow (H)	Ireland	3–1	BHC	George Stevenson, Jimmy McGrory, Bob McPhail
31 October 1931	Racecourse Ground, Wrexham (A)	Wales	3–2	BHC	George Stevenson, Robert Thomson, Jimmy McGrory
9 April 1932	Wembley Stadium, London (A)	England	0–3	BHC	
8 May 1932	Stade de Colombes Paris (A)	France	3–1	Friendly	Neil Dewar (3)

Key:

- (H) = Home match
- (A) = Away match
- BHC = British Home Championship
