= George Jenkins (soccer) =

Canadian soccer player (1904–1985)

George Edward Jenkins
Personal information
- Full name: George Edward Jenkins
- Date of birth: September 1904
- Place of birth: Stockton-on-Tees, England
- Date of death: January 1985 (aged 80)
- Place of death: Glasgow, Scotland
- Positions: Center forward; goalkeeper

Senior career*
Years	Team	Apps	(Gls)
- Montreal CPR
- Montreal Maroons
1926–1927	Indiana Flooring	9	(5)
1929	Rosemount Rangers		
1931	Iberville		
1932	Montreal CPR		
1933	Montréal Carsteel FC		
1933–1945	Rangers	25	(0)
1945–1946	Kilmarnock	0	(0)
1946–1947	Hamilton Academical	2	(0)
- * Club domestic league appearances and goals

George Edward Jenkins (September 1904 – January 1985) was a Canadian soccer player who began his career in Canada, spent a single season in the American Soccer League and ended it in Scotland.

Jenkins was born in Stockton-on-Tees, England, but his family moved to Canada when he was two. They settled in Montreal and he began his senior career with Montreal CPR of the Canadian National Soccer League. At some point he also played for the Montreal Maroons. In 1926, he moved south and signed with Indiana Flooring in the American Soccer League. He played only nine league games, but scored five goals, adding another goal in two National Challenge Cup games. He then returned to Montreal, rejoining the Maroons. Although he had played as a center forward up to this time, he now moved into the nets as a result of a serious knee injury and where he remained for the rest of his career. After recovery from injury he first played for Rosemount Rangers in Montreal in 1929, then Iberville in the Montreal and District League in 1931, and then on to Montreal CPR in 1932 and Montréal Carsteel FC in 1933. In 1933, Jenkins moved to Scotland and signed with Rangers. He then moved to Kilmarnock for a season, but did not feature in the league. He ended his career with Hamilton Academical during the 1946–47 season.
