= Don Macleod (footballer) =

Scottish footballer (1917–1999)

Donald Macleod
Personal information
- Full name: Donald Alexander Macleod
- Date of birth: 1 November 1917
- Place of birth: Edinburgh, Scotland
- Date of death: 1999 (aged 81)
- Place of death: Penicuik, Scotland
- Position: Wing half

Senior career*
Years	Team	Apps	(Gls)
–	Whitburn		
1938–1952	Motherwell	145	(2)
- * Club domestic league appearances and goals

Donald Alexander Macleod (1 November 1917 – 1999) was a Scottish footballer who played as a wing half for Motherwell. After he retired as a player, Macleod became the assistant trainer at Heart of Midlothian.
