= 1950–51 Scottish League Cup =

Tournament details
- Country: Scotland

Final positions
- Champions: Motherwell
- Runners-up: Hibernian

The 1950–51 Scottish League Cup was the fifth season of Scotland's second football knockout competition. The competition was won by Motherwell, who defeated Hibernian in the Final.

== First round ==
=== Group 1 ===
Team	Pld	W	D	L	GF	GA	GR	Pts
Celtic	6	4	2	0	12	6	2.000	10
Third Lanark	6	2	1	3	13	13	1.000	5
East Fife	6	1	3	2	13	15	0.867	5
Raith Rovers	6	1	2	3	10	14	0.714	4

Home team	Score	Away team	Date
Celtic	2–0	East Fife	12 August 1950
Raith Rovers	3–2	Third Lanark	12 August 1950
East Fife	3–3	Raith Rovers	16 August 1950
Third Lanark	1–2	Celtic	16 August 1950
Celtic	2–1	Raith Rovers	19 August 1950
East Fife	2–5	Third Lanark	19 August 1950
East Fife	1–1	Celtic	26 August 1950
Third Lanark	1–0	Raith Rovers	26 August 1950
Celtic	3–1	Third Lanark	30 August 1950
Raith Rovers	1–4	East Fife	30 August 1950
Raith Rovers	2–2	Celtic	2 September 1950
Third Lanark	3–3	East Fife	2 September 1950

=== Group 2 ===
Team	Pld	W	D	L	GF	GA	GR	Pts
Hibernian	6	6	0	0	24	4	6.000	12
St Mirren	6	2	1	3	7	16	0.438	5
Dundee	6	2	0	4	7	11	0.636	4
Falkirk	6	1	1	4	8	15	0.533	3

Home team	Score	Away team	Date
Falkirk	1–1	St Mirren	12 August 1950
Hibernian	2–0	Dundee	12 August 1950
St Mirren	0–6	Hibernian	15 August 1950
Dundee	1–2	Falkirk	16 August 1950
Dundee	3–1	St Mirren	19 August 1950
Falkirk	4–5	Hibernian	19 August 1950
Dundee	0–2	Hibernian	26 August 1950
St Mirren	2–0	Falkirk	26 August 1950
Falkirk	1–2	Dundee	30 August 1950
Hibernian	5–0	St Mirren	30 August 1950
Hibernian	4–0	Falkirk	2 September 1950
St Mirren	3–1	Dundee	2 September 1950

=== Group 3 ===
Team	Pld	W	D	L	GF	GA	GR	Pts
Motherwell	6	5	0	1	18	12	1.500	10
Heart of Midlothian	6	4	1	1	15	8	1.875	9
Partick Thistle	6	2	1	3	10	11	0.909	5
Airdrieonians	6	0	0	6	9	21	0.429	0

Home team	Score	Away team	Date
Motherwell	3–1	Airdrieonians	12 August 1950
Partick Thistle	1–1	Heart of Midlothian	12 August 1950
Airdrieonians	2–3	Partick Thistle	16 August 1950
Heart of Midlothian	4–1	Motherwell	16 August 1950
Heart of Midlothian	3–2	Airdrieonians	19 August 1950
Motherwell	2–1	Partick Thistle	19 August 1950
Airdrieonians	2–6	Motherwell	26 August 1950
Heart of Midlothian	2–0	Partick Thistle	26 August 1950
Motherwell	3–2	Heart of Midlothian	30 August 1950
Partick Thistle	3–1	Airdrieonians	30 August 1950
Airdrieonians	1–3	Heart of Midlothian	2 September 1950
Partick Thistle	2–3	Motherwell	2 September 1950

=== Group 4 ===
Team	Pld	W	D	L	GF	GA	GR	Pts
Aberdeen	6	5	0	1	17	9	1.889	10
Rangers	6	4	0	2	18	7	2.571	8
Clyde	6	1	2	3	15	21	0.714	4
Morton	6	0	2	4	10	23	0.435	2

Home team	Score	Away team	Date
Aberdeen	4–3	Clyde	12 August 1950
Morton	1–2	Rangers	12 August 1950
Clyde	3–3	Morton	16 August 1950
Rangers	1–2	Aberdeen	16 August 1950
Morton	0–2	Aberdeen	19 August 1950
Rangers	4–0	Clyde	19 August 1950
Clyde	4–1	Aberdeen	26 August 1950
Rangers	6–1	Morton	26 August 1950
Aberdeen	2–0	Rangers	30 August 1950
Morton	4–4	Clyde	30 August 1950
Aberdeen	6–1	Morton	2 September 1950
Clyde	1–5	Rangers	2 September 1950

=== Group 5 ===
Team	Pld	W	D	L	GF	GA	GR	Pts
Ayr United	6	5	1	0	16	5	3.200	11
Dunfermline Athletic	6	2	1	3	13	15	0.867	5
Kilmarnock	6	1	2	3	9	10	0.900	4
Dumbarton	6	1	2	3	4	12	0.333	4

Home team	Score	Away team	Date
Dumbarton	1–4	Ayr United	12 August 1950
Kilmarnock	3–1	Dunfermline Athletic	12 August 1950
Ayr United	2–2	Kilmarnock	16 August 1950
Dunfermline Athletic	4–1	Dumbarton	16 August 1950
Ayr United	1–0	Dunfermline Athletic	19 August 1950
Dumbarton	1–0	Kilmarnock	19 August 1950
Ayr United	3–0	Dumbarton	26 August 1950
Dunfermline Athletic	5–4	Kilmarnock	26 August 1950
Dumbarton	1–1	Dunfermline Athletic	30 August 1950
Kilmarnock	0–1	Ayr United	30 August 1950
Dunfermline Athletic	2–5	Ayr United	2 September 1950
Kilmarnock	0–0	Dumbarton	2 September 1950

=== Group 6 ===
Team	Pld	W	D	L	GF	GA	GR	Pts
Dundee United	6	4	1	1	19	10	1.900	9
St Johnstone	6	3	1	2	15	14	1.071	7
Cowdenbeath	6	1	3	2	12	13	0.923	5
Stenhousemuir	6	1	1	4	10	19	0.526	3

Home team	Score	Away team	Date
Cowdenbeath	0–2	St Johnstone	12 August 1950
Dundee United	2–1	Stenhousemuir	12 August 1950
St Johnstone	2–5	Dundee United	16 August 1950
Stenhousemuir	2–2	Cowdenbeath	16 August 1950
Cowdenbeath	2–2	Dundee United	19 August 1950
St Johnstone	6–2	Stenhousemuir	19 August 1950
St Johnstone	2–2	Cowdenbeath	26 August 1950
Stenhousemuir	3–2	Dundee United	26 August 1950
Cowdenbeath	5–1	Stenhousemuir	30 August 1950
Dundee United	4–1	St Johnstone	30 August 1950
Dundee United	4–1	Cowdenbeath	2 September 1950
Stenhousemuir	1–2	St Johnstone	2 September 1950

=== Group 7 ===
Team	Pld	W	D	L	GF	GA	GR	Pts
Queen of the South	6	3	3	0	15	11	1.364	9
Queen's Park	6	2	2	2	12	11	1.091	6
Hamilton Academical	6	2	1	3	9	9	1.000	5
Stirling Albion	6	1	2	3	6	11	0.545	4

Home team	Score	Away team	Date
Queen of the South	3–2	Hamilton Academical	12 August 1950
Queen's Park	1–0	Stirling Albion	12 August 1950
Hamilton Academical	2–1	Queen's Park	16 August 1950
Stirling Albion	1–3	Queen of the South	16 August 1950
Queen's Park	2–2	Queen of the South	19 August 1950
Stirling Albion	1–0	Hamilton Academical	19 August 1950
Hamilton Academical	1–1	Queen of the South	26 August 1950
Stirling Albion	2–2	Queen's Park	26 August 1950
Queen of the South	2–2	Stirling Albion	30 August 1950
Queen's Park	3–1	Hamilton Academical	30 August 1950
Hamilton Academical	3–0	Stirling Albion	2 September 1950
Queen of the South	4–3	Queen's Park	2 September 1950

=== Group 8 ===
Team	Pld	W	D	L	GF	GA	GR	Pts
Alloa Athletic	6	3	2	1	16	8	2.000	8
Forfar Athletic	6	3	0	3	9	14	0.643	6
Albion Rovers	6	2	1	3	9	10	0.900	5
Arbroath	6	2	1	3	9	11	0.818	5

Home team	Score	Away team	Date
Albion Rovers	3–2	Arbroath	12 August 1950
Alloa Athletic	6–0	Forfar Athletic	12 August 1950
Arbroath	1–1	Alloa Athletic	16 August 1950
Forfar Athletic	0–2	Albion Rovers	16 August 1950
Albion Rovers	1–3	Alloa Athletic	19 August 1950
Arbroath	3–0	Forfar Athletic	19 August 1950
Arbroath	1–0	Albion Rovers	26 August 1950
Forfar Athletic	3–1	Alloa Athletic	26 August 1950
Albion Rovers	1–2	Forfar Athletic	30 August 1950
Alloa Athletic	3–1	Arbroath	30 August 1950
Alloa Athletic	2–2	Albion Rovers	2 September 1950
Forfar Athletic	4–1	Arbroath	2 September 1950

== Quarter-finals ==
=== First leg ===
Home team	Score	Away team	Date
Aberdeen	4–1	Hibernian	16 September 1950
Ayr United	3–0	Dundee United	16 September 1950
Celtic	1–4	Motherwell	16 September 1950
Queen of the South	1–0	Alloa Athletic	16 September 1950

=== Second leg ===
Home team	Score	Away team	Date	Agg
Alloa Athletic	2–2	Queen of the South	20 September 1950	2–3
Dundee United	1–2	Ayr United	20 September 1950	1–5
Hibernian	4–1	Aberdeen	20 September 1950	5–5
Motherwell	0–1	Celtic	20 September 1950	4–2

=== Replay ===
Home team	Score	Away team	Date
Hibernian	1–1	Aberdeen	2 October 1950

=== 2nd Replay ===
Home team	Score	Away team	Date
Hibernian	5–1	Aberdeen	3 October 1950

== Semi-finals ==
Home team	Score	Away team	Date
Hibernian	3–1	Queen of the South	7 October 1950
Motherwell	4–3	Ayr United	7 October 1950

== Final ==
28 October 1950

Motherwell	3–0	Hibernian
Forrest 74'; Kelly 76'; Watters

Hampden Park, Glasgow
Attendance: 64,074
