= Wilson Humphries =

Scottish footballer and manager

Personal information
- Full name: William Wilson Humphries
- Date of birth: 1 July 1928
- Place of birth: Motherwell, Scotland
- Date of death: 22 October 1992 (aged 64)
- Place of death: Motherwell, Scotland
- Height: 1.75 m (5 ft 9 in)
- Position: Inside forward

Senior career*
Years	Team	Apps	(Gls)
1946–1956	Motherwell	199	(68)
1956–1957	St Mirren	22	(8)
1957–1959	Dundee United	54	(33)
1959–1961	Hamilton Academical	29	(4)

International career
1952	Scotland	1	(0)
1952	Scottish Football League XI	1	(0)

Managerial career
- 1970–1972: St Mirren
- * Club domestic league appearances and goals

William Wilson Humphries (1 July 1928 – 22 October 1992) was a Scottish footballer and manager who played as an inside forward. He began his playing career with Motherwell, where he played for ten years and won both Scottish domestic cup competitions. He later played for St Mirren, Dundee United and Hamilton Academical before returning to St Mirren for a two-year spell as manager. During his playing career, Humphries made one appearance each for the Scotland national team and the Scottish Football League XI.

== Career ==
Humphries was born in Motherwell in 1928 and began his career with his hometown club Motherwell in the mid-1940s straight from Dalziel High School. He spent a decade with the club, making just under 200 league appearances and scoring 68 goals. Humphries won both domestic cups during his time at Fir Park, winning the Scottish League Cup in 1950 and the Scottish Cup in 1952. Shortly after the Scottish Cup win, in which Humphries scored, he received his only Scotland cap, appearing in a 3–1 defeat in Sweden. Humphries also appeared in the Scottish Football League XI in 1952. In 1954, during Motherwell's record 12–1 win over Dundee United, Humphries netted six goals, another club record.

In 1956 Humphries moved to St Mirren, before joining Dundee United a year later, where he spent two years and scored 33 times in 54 league appearances. He left in 1959 and joined Hamilton Academical, where he spent the final two years of his playing career. After retiring from playing, Humphries returned to Motherwell as a part-time member of the coaching staff, where he remained throughout the 1960s. In 1970, Humphries returned to St Mirren as manager but his two-year spell included relegation in 1971 and he resigned the following year.

Humphries helped form the Motherwell Former Players Club in 1988. One of the South Stand corporate boxes at the club's ground, Fir Park, is named after him. He died in 1992.
