= The Famous Five (football) =

Collective term for five Hibernian football players

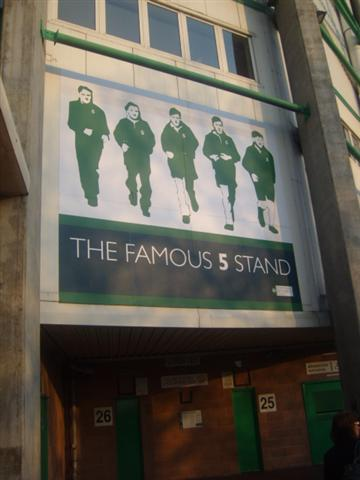
Picture depicting the Famous Five at Easter Road stadium

The Famous Five is the collective term for Hibernian's forward line of Gordon Smith, Bobby Johnstone, Lawrie Reilly, Eddie Turnbull and Willie Ormond. The north stand at Easter Road was named in their honour when it was rebuilt in 1995. All five players have been inducted into the Scottish Football Hall of Fame.

The first time that the Famous Five all started together in a competitive match was on 15 October 1949 versus Queen of the South at Easter Road. The Edinburgh club won the match 2–0. The first time they ever played together however, was in a pre-season friendly match against Nithsdale Wanderers at Sanquhar, when they won 7-2. The last match all five players started together was against Clyde at Easter Road on 29 January 1955. Despite Ormond and Reilly getting both on the scoresheet, the visitors won the match 3–2.

Most or all of the players featured significantly as Hibs won league championships in 1948, 1951 and 1952 – a remarkable achievement given that the club has only won one other championship, in 1903. Hibs also finished second to Rangers in 1953 on goal average and second to Rangers by a point in 1950. The team was less successful in cup competitions, however. Their only Scottish Cup Final appearance in this period was in 1947, where they lost 2–1 to Dave Halliday's Aberdeen. Hibs reached the final of the Coronation Cup in 1953 by winning against Newcastle United and Tottenham Hotspur, but lost 2–0 to Celtic in the final despite dominating play.

It was due to this successful period that Hibs played in the inaugural European Cup in the 1955–56 season, even though the club had only finished in 5th place in 1955, 15 points behind champions Aberdeen. The club reached the semi-finals of the European Cup, losing to Stade Reims.

The forward line was never picked as a whole unit for a Scottish international side. Four of the players appeared in a Scottish League XI game in October 1952, with Turnbull replaced by Dundee player Billy Steel. Reilly scored four of the five Scotland goals.
