= Duns F.C. =

Association football club in Scotland

Duns
- Full name: Duns Football Club
- Nickname: The Dingers
- Founded: 1882
- Ground: New Hawthorn Park, Duns
- Capacity: 1,000
- Coordinates: 55°46′33″N 2°21′27″W
- Chairman: Chris Burns
- Manager: James Brydon
- 2016–17: East of Scotland League, 12th (withdrew)
Home colours

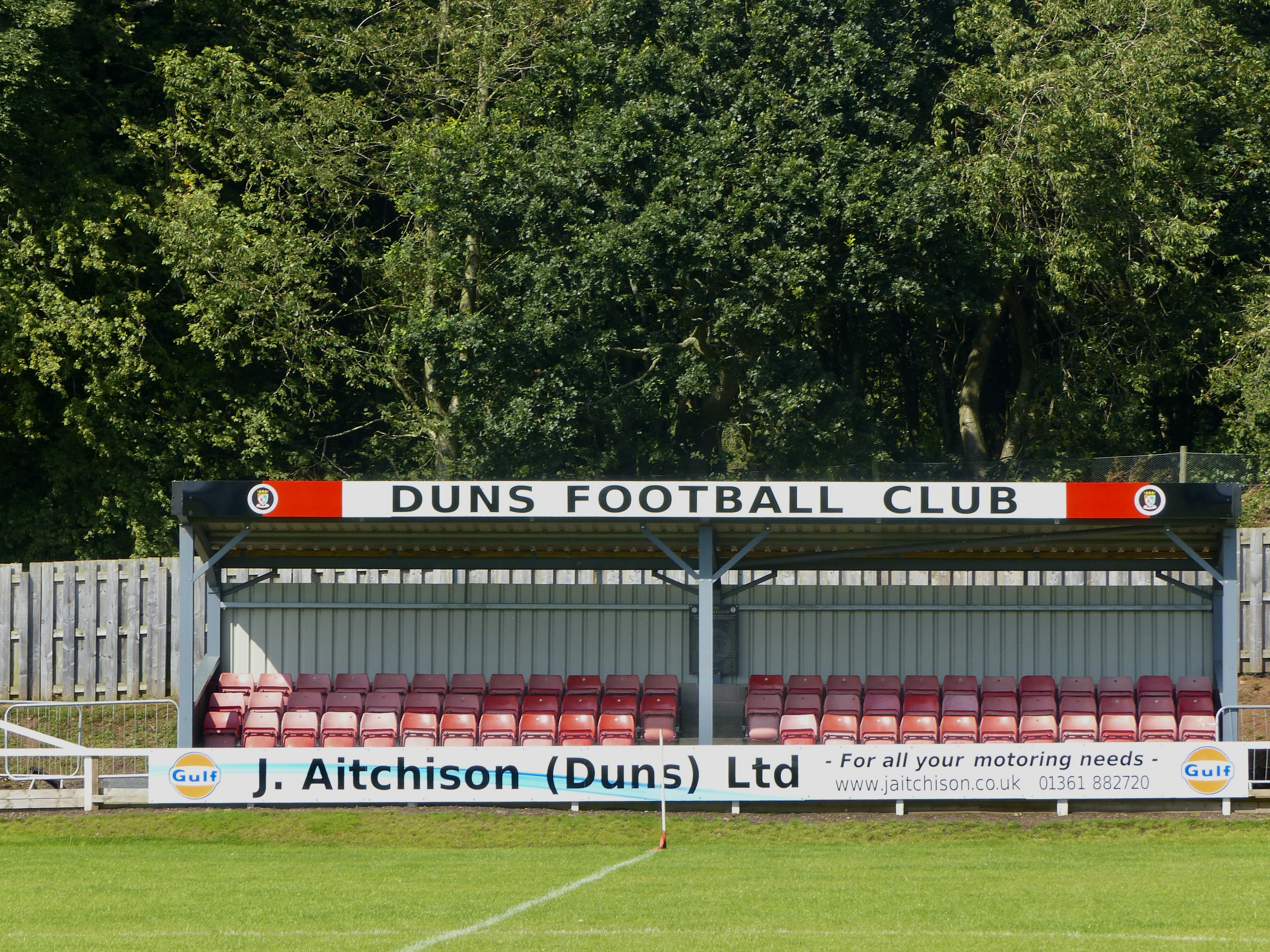
New Hawthorn Park stand

Duns Football Club is a football club from Duns in Scotland, playing in the A League of the Border Amateur League. The club previously competed in the East of Scotland Football League before withdrawing prior to the 2016–17 season.

== History ==
There used to be a team called Duns F.C. that competed at the senior non-league level in Scotland, and for many years this team played in the East of Scotland League. The current Duns club (often termed as Duns AFC or Duns Ams) regards itself as the successor of the original Duns senior side, and lists in its honours seven Border Cup successes, which spans the period of the different clubs.

They played in the Scottish Cup proper on 21 occasions, including a match at Parkhead against Celtic. In the 1956–57 cup Duns recorded an 11–1 first round victory over Edinburgh University, before losing to Eyemouth United in the next round. Duns played continuously in the East of Scotland League from the league's expansion in 1928–29 until the end of the 1967–68 season. Following this they had a couple of short spells in the league before their final appearance in the 1975–76 season.

The current incarnation of the team won the A League of the Border AFL on six occasions, including four championships won when the side was known as Duns Legion.

== James Keenan ==
During an Edinburgh City Cup tie in August 1937 against Leith Athletic at Meadowbank, Duns goalkeeper James Keenan, who had previously played for St Bernards, collapsed after reaching for a high ball. Keenan was rushed to hospital but he was declared dead on arrival. When news of Keenan's death reached the ground, the match was stopped. Keenan was 38 years old and his 10-year-old son was watching the match. He had captained Duns to triumph in the Scottish Qualifying Cup the previous season.

== Honours ==
SFA South Region Challenge Cup

- Runners-up: 2011–12

King Cup

- Winners: 1935–36, 1938–39, 1957–58, 1963–64

Multiple Border amateur league honours
