= Johnny Aitkenhead =

Scottish footballer

Personal information
- Full name: John Aitkenhead
- Date of birth: 8 October 1923
- Place of birth: Blantyre, South Lanarkshire, Scotland
- Date of death: 29 March 1987 (aged 63)
- Place of death: East Kilbride, Scotland
- Height: 5 ft 6 in (1.68 m)
- Position: Winger

Youth career
- Blantyre Academical

Senior career*
Years	Team	Apps	(Gls)
1941–1946	Queen's Park	0	(0)
1946–1949	Hibernian	22	(10)
1949–1957	Motherwell	170	(49)
1957	Hamilton Academical	11	(4)
Total		203	(63)

International career
1951–1952	Scottish Football League XI	3	(3)
- * Club domestic league appearances and goals

John Aitkenhead (8 October 1923 – 29 March 1987) was a Scottish footballer, who played for Queen's Park, Hibernian, Motherwell and Hamilton Academical. He also represented the Scottish Football League XI three times.
