= Willie Kilmarnock =

Scottish footballer

Personal information
- Date of birth: 16 January 1922
- Place of birth: Irvine, Scotland
- Date of death: 7 June 2009 (aged 87)
- Height: 1.70 m (5 ft 7 in)
- Position: Right back

Senior career*
Years	Team	Apps	(Gls)
- Irvine Meadow XI
1939–1956	Motherwell	296	(11)
1956–1958	Airdrieonians	32	(0)
Total		328	(11)

International career
1944	Scotland (wartime)	1	(0)
1948	Scottish Football League XI	1	(0)
Medal record
Motherwell
Winner	Scottish League Cup	1951
Winner	Scottish Cup	1952
Runner-up	Scottish League Cup	1955
- * Club domestic league appearances and goals

William Kilmarnock (16 January 1922 – 7 June 2009) was a Scottish footballer who most notably captained Motherwell's 1952 Scottish Cup winning team. He also played for Airdrie and Irvine Meadow XI.

Kilmarnock played for Scotland in an unofficial wartime international and represented the Scottish Football League XI, but never received a full cap.
