= Jack Mowat =

Scottish football referee

John Alexander Mowat, MBE (1 April 1906 – 12 March 1995) was a Scottish football referee who also operated for FIFA.

== Career ==
Often listed on reports as 'J. A. Mowat, Burnside', he became a referee in his 30s having taken charge of matches while serving with the Royal Air Force (RAFVR) during World War II; he was awarded the MBE for his military service in the 1946 Birthday Honours.

After becoming a 'grade one' official, his appointments included seven Scottish Cup finals (1950, 1951, 1952, 1953, 1957, 1958 and 1959) and five in the Scottish League Cup (1951, 1952, 1954, 1956 and 1957).

His final match at the age of 54 was the 1960 European Cup Final held in Glasgow. Mowat was praised for his handling of the fixture, in which Real Madrid defeated Eintracht Frankfurt 7–3 (the highest scoring final in the history of the competition, watched by the biggest crowd).

He also took charge of one match at the 1958 FIFA World Cup (a 2–1 win for hosts Sweden over Hungary in the tournament's Group stage), and several in the British Home Championship.

Mowat later served a lengthy term as head of the Scottish Football Association's Refereeing Committee, overseeing and appointing officials. The 'Jack Mowat Trophy' is presented each year to the referee who is chosen for the Scottish Cup Final.

Preceded by 1959 European Cup Final (West Germany) Albert Dusch	European Cup / Champions League Final Referees; 1960 European Cup Final (Scotland) Jack Mowat	Succeeded by 1961 European Cup Final (Switzerland) Gottfried Dienst
