= Archie Kelly =

Scottish footballer

Personal information
- Full name: Archibald Kelly
- Date of birth: 9 December 1921
- Place of birth: Glasgow, Scotland
- Date of death: 15 July 2005 (aged 83)
- Place of death: Paisley, Scotland
- Height: 5 ft 8 in (1.73 m)
- Position: Centre forward

Senior career*
Years	Team	Apps	(Gls)
- Arthurlie
1942–1947	Heart of Midlothian	34	(18)
1947–1949	Aberdeen	36	(21)
1949–1953	Motherwell	104	(65)
1953–1955	Stirling Albion	33	(14)
1955	Ayr United	11	(7)
1955	Cowdenbeath	2	(0)
Total		222	(125)
- * Club domestic league appearances and goals

Archibald Kelly (9 December 1921 – 15 July 2005) was a Scottish footballer who played as a centre forward. He is best remembered for his time with Motherwell, his goals helping the side to their first victories in both the Scottish Cup and Scottish League Cup. He was born in Glasgow.

== Playing career ==
=== Heart of Midlothian ===
Kelly joined Hearts from Arthurlie in 1942 and soon became a regular fixture in their wartime competition line-ups. Predominantly a centre forward, although occasionally deployed at outside left, he was a powerful, combative player, renowned for his bravery. A notable example of his determination occurred in a match against Kilmarnock during the 1946–47 season when, in an attempt to meet an errant cross, he collided with a goalpost at full stretch. The power of the impact shattered his collarbone but also cracked the wooden goal-frame! He was also a frequent goalscorer throughout his career, with a seven-goal haul in a 10–3 defeat of Albion Rovers in 1943.

=== Aberdeen ===
In December 1947, with Hearts struggling in the League, their manager Davie McLean moved to sign Aberdeen's Scottish international forward George Hamilton, with Archie Kelly and £8,000 going to Aberdeen in recompense. Despite playing only half a season for the Dons, Kelly finished the 1947–48 season as their top League scorer. The following season found Aberdeen battling against relegation and was also frustrating for Kelly on a personal level, as he struggled with a bad knee injury. Aberdeen's main problem was their porous defence; in contrast, with Kelly, Stan Williams, Harry Yorston and the returning George Hamilton, they had a surplus of attacking options and when Motherwell offered £7,000 for Kelly in November 1949, Aberdeen allowed him to leave.

=== Motherwell ===
Kelly quickly settled at Motherwell and scored four times when old side Aberdeen visited Fir Park later that season. Motherwell finished mid-table in 1948–49 and again the following year, however their cup form in 1950–51 was a revelation. They lost only one match en route to the 1950 Scottish League Cup final, where they would meet Hibernian at Hampden. After an evenly balanced first half, Kelly opened the scoring, although his goal owed much to a mistake by Hibs goalkeeper Tommy Younger. Motherwell eventually won 3–0, securing only their second national trophy. The side also reached the Scottish Cup final that year but succumbed 1–0 to Celtic.

Motherwell made amends for their Scottish Cup final disappointment the next season, defeating Dundee comprehensively by 4–0. Kelly scored the final goal in front of the biggest crowd ever recorded for a domestic club match not involving the Old Firm.

=== Later career ===
Surprisingly, Motherwell suffered their first ever relegation the following year, although in an incredibly tight competition they finished only five points behind fourth-placed Hearts. Kelly was one of several big-name players to leave the club, joining perennial yo-yo team Stirling Albion in 1953. He helped the Binos avoid relegation from the top division in 1953–54 before joining Second Division Ayr United in January 1955. He finished his career after a short stint with Cowdenbeath.
