= 1950–51 in Scottish football =

Division A champions
- Hibernian

Division B champions
- Queen of the South

Division C (North & East) champions
- Heart of Midlothian 'A'

Division C (South & West) champions
- Clyde 'A'

Scottish Cup winners
- Celtic

League Cup winners
- Motherwell

Division C League Cup winners
- Aberdeen 'A'

Junior Cup winners
- Petershill

Scotland national team
- 1951 BHC

The 1950–51 season was the 78th season of competitive football in Scotland and the 54th season of the Scottish Football League.

== Scottish League Division A ==
Pos	Team	Pld	W	D	L	GF	GA	GD	Pts
1	Hibernian	30	22	4	4	78	26	+52	48
2	Rangers	30	17	4	9	64	37	+27	38
3	Dundee	30	15	8	7	47	30	+17	38
4	Heart of Midlothian	30	16	5	9	72	45	+27	37
5	Aberdeen	30	15	5	10	61	50	+11	35
6	Partick Thistle	30	13	7	10	57	48	+9	33
7	Celtic	30	12	5	13	48	46	+2	29
8	Raith Rovers	30	13	2	15	52	52	0	28
9	Motherwell	30	11	6	13	58	65	−7	28
10	East Fife	30	10	8	12	48	66	−18	28
11	St Mirren	30	9	7	14	35	51	−16	25
12	Morton	30	10	4	16	47	59	−12	24
13	Third Lanark	30	11	2	17	40	51	−11	24
14	Airdrieonians	30	10	4	16	52	67	−15	24
15	Clyde	30	8	7	15	37	57	−20	23
16	Falkirk	30	7	4	19	35	81	−46	18

Source: RSSSF

Champions: Hibernian
Relegated: Clyde, Falkirk

== Scottish League Division B ==
Pos	Team	Pld	W	D	L	GF	GA	GD	Pts	Promotion or relegation
1	Queen of the South	30	21	3	6	69	35	+34	45	Promotion to the 1951–52 Division A
2	Stirling Albion	30	21	3	6	78	44	+34	45	Promotion to the 1951–52 Division A
3	Ayr United	30	15	6	9	64	40	+24	36	
4	Dundee United	30	16	4	10	78	58	+20	36	
5	St Johnstone	30	14	5	11	68	53	+15	33	
6	Queen's Park	30	13	7	10	56	53	+3	33	
7	Hamilton Academical	30	12	8	10	65	49	+16	32	
8	Albion Rovers	30	14	4	12	56	51	+5	32	
9	Dumbarton	30	12	5	13	52	53	−1	29	
10	Dunfermline Athletic	30	12	4	14	58	73	−15	28	
11	Cowdenbeath	30	12	3	15	61	57	+4	27	
12	Kilmarnock	30	8	8	14	44	49	−5	24	
13	Arbroath	30	8	5	17	46	78	−32	21	
14	Forfar Athletic	30	9	3	18	43	76	−33	21	
15	Stenhousemuir	30	9	2	19	51	80	−29	20	
16	Alloa Athletic	30	7	4	19	58	98	−40	18	

Source: "1950-1951 Division B - SPFL Archive". SPFL.

Promoted: Queen of the South, Stirling Albion

== Scottish League Division C ==
Section	Winner	Runner-up
South-West	Clyde 'A'	Ayr United 'A'
North-East	Hearts 'A'	Aberdeen 'A'

== Cup honours ==
Competition	Winner	Score	Runner-up
Scottish Cup	Celtic	1 – 0	Motherwell
League Cup	Motherwell	3 – 0	Hibernian
Junior Cup	Petershill	1 – 0	Irvine Meadow XI

== Other honours ==
=== National ===
Competition	Winner	Score	Runner-up
Scottish Qualifying Cup – North	Deveronvale	5 – 4 *	Clachnacuddin
Scottish Qualifying Cup – South	Wigtown	4 – 0 *	Duns

=== County ===
Competition	Winner	Score	Runner-up
Aberdeenshire Cup	Deveronvale	3 – 0 *†	Peterhead
Ayrshire Cup	Kilmarnock	6 – 1 *	Ayr United
Fife Cup	Raith Rovers		Cowdenbeath
Forfarshire Cup	Dundee United	3 – 2	Dundee
Glasgow Cup	Partick Thistle	3 – 2 †	Celtic
Lanarkshire Cup	Albion Rovers	2 – 1	Motherwell
Renfrewshire Cup	Morton	1 – 0	St Mirren
Stirlingshire Cup	Falkirk	3 – 1 *	Stirling Albion

- * – aggregate over two legs
- † – replay

=== Highland League ===
Top Three
Pos	Team	Pld	W	D	L	GF	GA	GD	Pts
1	Inverness Caledonian	28	22	4	2	93	32	+61	48
2	Buckie Thistle	28	17	5	6	99	56	+43	39
3	Fraserburgh	28	14	6	8	72	50	+22	34

== Scotland national team ==
Date	Venue	Opponents	Score	Competition	Scotland scorer(s)
21 October 1950	Ninian Park, Cardiff (A)	Wales	3–1	BHC	Lawrie Reilly (2), Billy Liddell
1 November 1950	Hampden Park, Glasgow (H)	Northern Ireland	6–1	BHC	Billy Steel (4), John McPhail (2)
13 December 1950	Hampden Park, Glasgow (H)	Austria	0–1	Friendly	
14 April 1951	Wembley Stadium, London (A)	England	3–2	BHC	Bobby Johnstone, Lawrie Reilly, Billy Liddell
12 May 1951	Hampden Park, Glasgow (H)	Denmark	3–1	Friendly	Billy Steel, Lawrie Reilly, Robert Mitchell
16 May 1951	Hampden Park, Glasgow (H)	France	1–0	Friendly	Lawrie Reilly
20 May 1951	Heysel Stadium, Brussels (A)	Belgium	5–0	Friendly	George Hamilton (3), Jimmy Mason, Willie Waddell
27 May 1951	Prater Stadium, Vienna (A)	Austria	0–4	Friendly	

1951 British Home Championship – winners

Key:

- (H) = Home match
- (A) = Away match
- BHC = British Home Championship
