= Jim Forrest (footballer, born 1927) =

Scottish footballer

Personal information
- Date of birth: 31 March 1927
- Place of birth: Bothwell, Scotland
- Date of death: 26 November 1992 (aged 65)
- Place of death: Aberdeen, Scotland
- Height: 6 ft 0 in (1.83 m)
- Position: Inside forward

Senior career*
Years	Team	Apps	(Gls)
- Newarthill Hearts
1949–1960	Motherwell	214	(57)
1960–1962	Stenhousemuir	16	(4)

International career
1958	Scotland	1	(0)
- * Club domestic league appearances and goals

James Forrest (31 March 1927 – 26 November 1992) was a Scottish footballer, who played for Motherwell (making over 300 appearances), Stenhousemuir and Scotland. He was born in Bothwell.
