= Willie Redpath =

Scottish footballer

William Redpath
Personal information
- Full name: William Yates Redpath
- Date of birth: 8 August 1922
- Place of birth: Stoneyburn, Scotland
- Date of death: 20 January 1989 (aged 66)
- Height: 1.73 m (5 ft 8 in)
- Position: Left half

Youth career
- Polkemmet

Senior career*
Years	Team	Apps	(Gls)
1946–1956	Motherwell	227	(19)
1956–1957	Third Lanark	20	(3)
Total		247	(22)

International career
1948–1952	Scotland	9	(0)
1948–1950	Scottish League XI	7	(1)
- * Club domestic league appearances and goals

William Yates Redpath (8 August 1922 – 20 January 1989) was a Scottish professional footballer who is best known for his time at Motherwell. Redpath played for Motherwell at left half, and he scored Motherwell's second goal in a 4–0 thrashing of Dundee in the 1952 Scottish Cup Final. Having lost 1–0 to Celtic in the final the year before, it was Redpath's chance to get his hands on the trophy. Redpath also represented Scotland on nine occasions and the Scottish League XI.

== Career statistics ==
=== International appearances ===
Scotland national team
Year	Apps	Goals
1948	2	0
1951	6	0
1952	1	0
Total	9	0
