= Archie Shaw =

Scottish footballer (1922–1985)

Personal information
- Full name: Archibald Hamilton Ramage Shaw
- Date of birth: 7 August 1922
- Place of birth: Netherton, Scotland
- Date of death: 1985 (aged 62)
- Place of death: Wishaw, Scotland
- Height: 5 ft 8 in (1.73 m)
- Position: Left back

Senior career*
| Years | Team | Apps | (Gls) |
- Wishaw
| 1942–1958 | Motherwell | 256 | (0) |

International career
| 1948–1951 | Scottish League XI | 2 | (0) |
- * Club domestic league appearances and goals

Archibald Hamilton Ramage Shaw (7 August 1922 – 1985) was a Scottish footballer who played for Motherwell. He also represented the Scottish League twice.
