= Andy Paton =

Scottish footballer and manager

Personal information
- Full name: Andrew Paton
- Date of birth: 2 January 1923
- Place of birth: Dreghorn, Scotland
- Date of death: 8 February 2014 (aged 91)
- Place of death: Markinch, Scotland
- Position: Centre half

Senior career*
Years	Team	Apps	(Gls)
–	Irvine Meadow		
–	Kello Rovers		
1942–1958	Motherwell	302	(0)
1958–1960	Hamilton Academical	34	(0)
Total		336	(0)

International career
1945–1946	Scotland (wartime)	2	(0)
1946–1952	Scotland	3	(0)

Managerial career
- 1959–1968: Hamilton Academical
- * Club domestic league appearances and goals

Andrew Paton (2 January 1923 – 8 February 2014) was a Scottish football player and manager.

A centre half, Paton played primarily for Motherwell, with a short spell at Hamilton Academical late in his career, and he then managed Hamilton for nine years. He won the Scottish Cup, Scottish League Cup and Scottish Division Two with Motherwell – having joined as a teenager from the Junior level during World War II – and in 2006 was voted the club's 'greatest ever player'. On 10 November 2020, it was announced that Paton was to be inducted into the Motherwell F.C. Hall of Fame.

He appeared three times for Scotland; his debut came in January 1946 against Belgium (considered official by the national associations, unlike two other fixtures he played in the same immediate post-war period) and his second and third appearances were made on a summer 1952 tour of Scandinavia. At the time of his death in 2014 (aged 91), he was the oldest surviving Scotland international.
