= Hibernian F.C. =

Association football club in Leith, Edinburgh, Scotland

Hibernian
- Full name: Hibernian Football Club
- Nicknames: Hibs; The Hibees; The Cabbage; Cabbage and Ribs
- Founded: 6 August 1875; 151 years ago
- Ground: Easter Road, Edinburgh
- Capacity: 20,421
- Coordinates: 55°57′42″N 3°9′55″W
- Owner: Bydand Sports
- Chairman: Ian Gordon
- Head coach: Marink Reedijk
- League: Scottish Premiership
- 2025–26: Scottish Premiership, 5th of 12
- Website: www.hibernianfc.co.uk
Home colours	Away colours	Third colours

Hibernian Football Club, commonly known as Hibs or the Hibees, is a professional football club based in the Leith area of Edinburgh, Scotland. The club competes in the Scottish Premiership, the highest division of Scottish football. Founded in 1875 by members of Edinburgh's Irish community, the club takes its name from Hibernia, the Latin name for Ireland. Hibernian traditionally play in green shirts with white sleeves and have played their home matches at Easter Road since 1893. The stadium has a capacity of 20,421.

Hibernian became the first British club to compete in the European Cup, reaching the semi-final of the inaugural 1955–56 competition. The club also reached the semi-final of the 1960–61 Inter-Cities Fairs Cup, eliminating Barcelona in the quarter-final. Other notable European victories include those against Porto and Sporting CP. In 1967, Hibs overturned a 4–1 first-leg defeat against Napoli, scoring five goals past future World Cup winning goalkeeper Dino Zoff at Easter Road to progress 6–4 on aggregate.

Domestically, Hibernian have won four Scottish league championships, three Scottish Cups and three Scottish League Cups. The club's most successful era came between 1948 and 1952, when Hibs won three league championships during the era of the celebrated Famous Five forward line. In 2016, the club ended a 114-year wait to win the Scottish Cup, defeating Rangers 3–2 in the final.

Hibernian's history includes several notable football firsts. On 7 May 1881, the club's former ground, Hibernian Park, hosted the world's first recorded women's international football match, in which Scotland defeated England 3–0. The club became the first British top-flight team to display a shirt sponsor in 1977. Hibs also pioneered stadium innovations at Easter Road, installing Scotland's first major floodlighting system in 1954 and becoming the first Scottish club to introduce undersoil heating in 1980.

The club's fans are renowned for their renditions of Sunshine on Leith, a song by Scottish duo the Proclaimers, which is widely acclaimed as one of the greatest anthems in world football. It won BBC Radio 6 Music’s Football Anthems World Cup in 2018, being voted the UK's favourite football anthem. Hibernian have a longstanding rivalry with Heart of Midlothian, with whom they contest the Edinburgh derby.

== History ==
=== Foundation and early history (1875–1939) ===
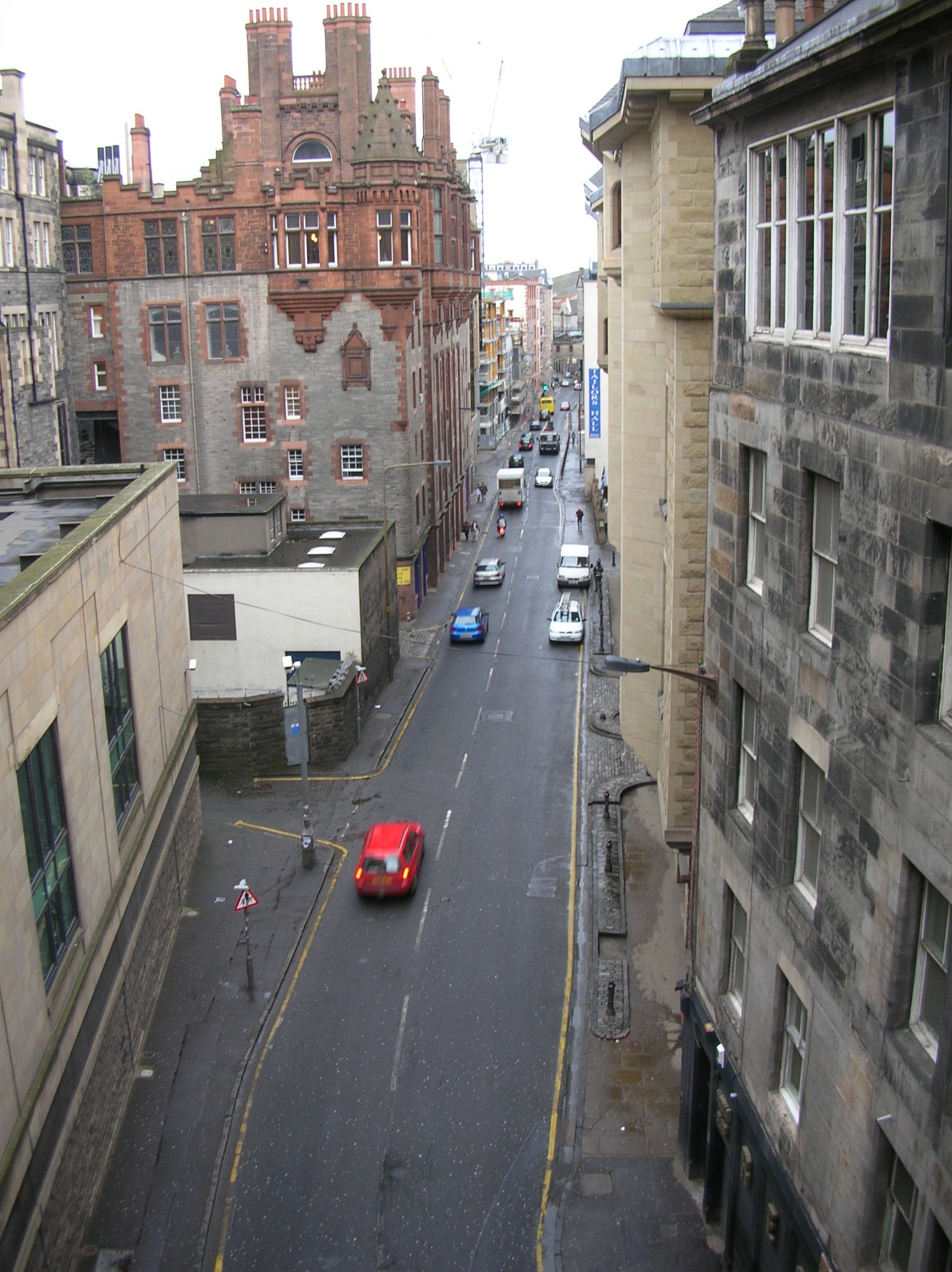
The Cowgate, where Hibs were formed in 1875.

The club was founded in 1875 by Irishmen living in the Cowgate area of Edinburgh. The name Hibernian (deriving from Hibernia, an ancient name for Ireland), the colour green, the Celtic harp and the Irish language phrase Erin go bragh (meaning Ireland Forever) were adopted as symbols early on. Founder Fr. Edward Joseph Hannan was the first president of the club and Michael Whelahan its first team captain. James Connolly, the famous socialist and Irish Republican leader, was a Hibs fan, while the club were "closely identified" with the Irish Home Rule movement during the 1880s. There was some sectarian resistance initially to an Irish club participating in Scottish football, but Hibs established themselves as a force in Scottish football in the 1880s. Hibs were the first club from the east coast of Scotland to win a major trophy, the 1887 Scottish Cup. They went on to defeat Preston North End, who had reached the semi-finals of the 1887 FA Cup, in a friendly match described as the Association Football Championship of the World Decider. Despite advertising the match as 'The Association Football Championship of the World', Preston had lost in the FA Cup semi-finals to West Bromwich Albion and were not the 'best' English side that year.

Mismanagement over the next few years led to Hibs becoming homeless and the club temporarily ceased operating in 1891. A lease on the Easter Road site was acquired in late 1892 and Hibs played its first match at Easter Road on 4 February 1893. Despite this interruption, the club today views the period since 1875 as one continued history and therefore counts the honours won between 1875 and 1891, including the 1887 Scottish Cup. The club were admitted to the Scottish Football League in 1893, although they had to win the Second Division twice before being elected into the First Division in 1895.

The Hibs team of 1903

A significant change at this time was that players were no longer required to be members of the Catholic Young Men's Society. Hibs are seen today as being an Irish or Roman Catholic institution, as it was in the early years of its history. For instance, the Irish harp was only re-introduced to the club badge when it was last re-designed in 2000. This design reflects the three pillars of the club's identity: Ireland, Edinburgh (the castle) and Leith (the ship). Geography as well as ethnicity and religion shapes the modern fan base of the club, with Hibs drawing most of their support from the north and east of Edinburgh.

Hibs had some success after being reformed, winning the 1902 Scottish Cup and their first league championship a year later. After this, however, the club endured a long barren spell. The club lost its placing in the league and were relegated for the first time in 1931, although they were promoted back to the top division two years later. The notorious Scottish Cup drought began as they reached three cup finals, two in consecutive years, but lost each of them.

=== The Famous Five (1939–1959) ===
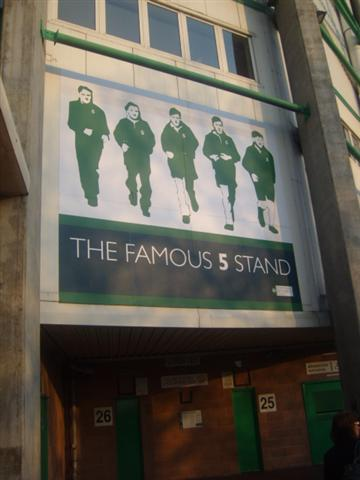
Picture depicting the Famous Five at Easter Road stadium.

Hibs' most successful era was in the decade following the end of the Second World War, when it was "among the foremost clubs in Britain". The forward line of Gordon Smith, Bobby Johnstone, Lawrie Reilly, Eddie Turnbull and Willie Ormond, collectively known as the Famous Five, was "regarded as the finest ever seen in Scottish football". Each of the Famous Five scored more than 100 goals for Hibs. The north stand at Easter Road is now named in their honour. Smith was signed by Hibs in 1941, while Ormond, Turnbull, Reilly and Johnstone were all signed during 1946. Of the five, only Ormond cost Hibs a transfer fee, £1200 from Stenhousemuir. Reilly, Johnstone, Smith and Turnbull were all signed from youth or junior leagues.

In the first season of competitive football after the Second World War, Hibs reached the 1947 Scottish Cup final. They took an early lead in the match, but went on to lose 2–1 to Aberdeen. With Reilly added to the first team in 1947–48, Hibs won the Scottish league championship for the first time since 1903. This was achieved despite the death of team manager Willie McCartney in January 1948. McCartney was succeeded by Hugh Shaw, who added Johnstone to the first team during 1948. Hibs finished third in the league in 1948–49. In a friendly match against Nithsdale Wanderers on 21 April 1949, Hibs included all of the famous five players in the same team for the first time. They then made their collective competitive debut on 15 October 1949, in a 2–0 win against Queen of the South. They improved on their season from the year before, by finishing second in the league to Rangers by one point.

1950–51 was the high point of the Famous Five era. With other internationalists such as Tommy Younger and Bobby Combe, Hibs won the league by 10 points (when two points were awarded for each win). They reached the 1950 Scottish League Cup final. Turnbull had scored a hattrick in the semi-final but was unavailable for the final. Jimmy Bradley started at left wing with Ormond moved to inside left. Motherwell beat them 3–0. Hibs retained the league championship in 1951–52, this time winning by four points. Hibs were narrowly denied a third consecutive title in 1952–53 on the last day of the season. A late Rangers equaliser against Queen of the South took the title to Ibrox on goal average. The Famous Five forward line remained in place until March 1955, when Johnstone was sold to Manchester City.

Despite only finishing fifth in the Scottish League in 1955, Hibs were invited to participate in the first season of the European Cup, which was not strictly based on league positions at that time. Eighteen clubs who were thought would generate interest across Europe and who also had the floodlights necessary to play games at night, were invited to participate. Floodlights had been used at Easter Road for the first time in a friendly match against Hearts on 18 October 1954. Hibs became the first British club in Europe because the English Football League secretary Alan Hardaker persuaded Chelsea, the English champions, not to enter.

Hibs played their first match against Rot-Weiss Essen, winning 4–0 in the Georg-Melches-Stadion and drawing 1–1 at Easter Road. They defeated Djurgårdens IF to reach the semi-final, but in that clash they were defeated 3–0 on aggregate by Stade de Reims, who had the famous France international player Raymond Kopa in their side. Reims lost 4–3 to Real Madrid in the final.

=== Turnbull's Tornadoes (1960–1989) ===
Hibs frequently participated in the Fairs Cup during the 1960s, winning matches against Barcelona and Napoli. However, the club achieved little domestically until former player Eddie Turnbull was persuaded to return to Easter Road as manager in 1971. The team, popularly known as Turnbull's Tornadoes, finished second in the league in 1974 and 1975 and won the League Cup in 1972. The club also won the Drybrough Cup in 1972 and 1973, and recorded a 7–0 win over Edinburgh derby rivals Hearts at Tynecastle on 1 January 1973.

Performances went into decline after the mid-1970s, as Hibs were replaced by the New Firm of Aberdeen and Dundee United as the main challengers to the Old Firm. Turnbull resigned as manager and Hibs were relegated, for the second time in their history, in 1980. They were immediately promoted back to the Scottish Premier Division in 1981, but the club struggled during the 1980s, failing to qualify for European competition until 1989.

=== 1990s: Attempted takeover by Hearts ===
After mismanagement during the late 1980s, Hibs were on the brink of financial ruin in 1990. Wallace Mercer, the chairman of Hearts, proposed a merger of the two clubs, but the Hibs fans believed that the proposal was more like a hostile takeover. They formed the Hands off Hibs group to campaign for the continued existence of the club. This succeeded when a prominent local businessman, Kwik Fit owner Sir Tom Farmer, acquired a controlling interest in Hibs. The fans were able to convince Farmer to take control despite the fact that he had no great interest in football. Farmer was persuaded in part by the fact that a relative of his had been involved in the rescue of Hibs from financial ruin in the early 1890s. After the attempted takeover by Mercer, Hibs had a few good years in the early 1990s, winning the 1991 Scottish League Cup final and finishing in the top five in the league in 1993, 1994 and 1995. Soon after Alex McLeish was appointed as manager in 1998, Hibs were relegated to the First Division, but immediately won promotion back to the SPL in 1999.

=== 2000s: "Golden generation" ===
Hibs enjoyed a good season in 2000–01 as they finished third in the league and reached the 2001 Scottish Cup final, which was lost 3–0 to Celtic. Manager Alex McLeish departed for Rangers in December 2001; team captain Franck Sauzée was appointed as the new manager, despite the fact that he had no previous coaching experience. A terrible run of form followed and Sauzée was fired after being in charge for 69 days.

Kilmarnock manager Bobby Williamson was then hired, but he proved to be unpopular with Hibs supporters. However, a "golden generation" of exciting young players emerged, including Garry O'Connor, Derek Riordan, Kevin Thomson and Scott Brown. These players featured heavily as Hibs eliminated both halves of the Old Firm to reach the 2004 Scottish League Cup final, only to lose 2–0 to Livingston. Williamson departed near the end of that season to manage Plymouth Argyle and was replaced by Tony Mowbray. Hibs finished third in his first season as manager, while Mowbray won the SFWA Manager of the Year award.

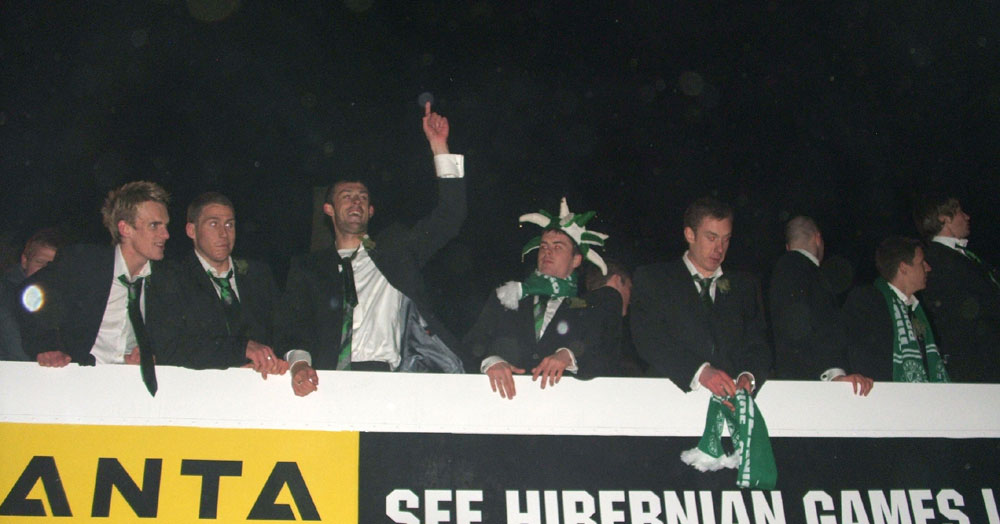
The Scottish League Cup is paraded in March 2007.

Mowbray left Hibs in October 2006 to manage West Bromwich Albion, and was replaced by former player John Collins. The team won the 2007 Scottish League Cup final under his management, but the club sold Kevin Thomson, Scott Brown and Steven Whittaker for fees totalling more than £8 million. Collins resigned later that year, frustrated by the lack of funds provided to sign new players.

Former Hibs player Mixu Paatelainen was hired to replace Collins. On 24 July 2008, Hibernian faced Barcelona in a pre-season friendly at Murrayfield, in what was Pep Guardiola's first match as manager of the Spanish club. The fixture also marked Lionel Messi's first appearance wearing Barcelona's famous number 10 shirt, in which he scored, and featured the debuts of five new Barcelona signings, including Gerard Piqué and Dani Alves. Barcelona went on to win a historic treble in Guardiola's first season.

Paatelainen left Hibs at the end of the 2008–09 season. Another former Hibernian player, John Hughes, was soon appointed in his place. Hughes, who made high-profile signings such as Anthony Stokes and Liam Miller, led Hibs on a 12 game unbeaten run in 2009–10 season, eventually finishing fourth and qualifying for the UEFA Europa League.

=== 2010s: Scottish Cup success ===
A poor start to the 2010–11 season led to John Hughes leaving the club and replaced by Colin Calderwood, who was himself sacked a year later. The club avoided relegation in 2011–12 and reached the 2012 Scottish Cup final under new manager Pat Fenlon, but this was lost 5–1 to Hearts. Fenlon largely rebuilt the team after this defeat. This resulted in an improved league position in 2012–13 and the team again reaching the Scottish Cup final in 2013, which was lost 3–0 to league champions Celtic. Hibs qualified for the 2013–14 UEFA Europa League, but they suffered a Scottish record defeat in European competition (9–0 on aggregate against Malmö). Fenlon resigned on 1 November and was replaced by Terry Butcher. A run of 13 games without a win to finish the 2013–14 Scottish Premiership season meant that Hibs fell into a relegation play-off, which was lost after a penalty shootout against Hamilton Academical.

Butcher was sacked in June 2014 and was replaced by Alan Stubbs. He was unable to lead the team to promotion, but the 2015–16 season saw considerable cup success. The team reached the League Cup final, which was lost to Ross County. This was followed by victory in the Scottish Cup for the first time since 1902 with a 3–2 win in the final against Rangers. As well as ending the unwanted long-term cup record, the result helped shake off a reputation of Hibs building up expectations of success only to fail, popularised among opposing supporters and in Scottish media as having 'Hibsed it'; the club's own fans then adopted the phrase as a positive reference to the occasion though it would still be repeated in future when the club was seen as underachieving. Soon after the cup win, Stubbs resigned as Hibs manager to take charge at Rotherham United and was replaced by Neil Lennon, who led the team to promotion by winning the 2016–17 Scottish Championship. In their first season back in the top flight, Hibs finished fourth in the Premiership and qualified for the Europa League. Lennon left the club in January 2019 and was replaced by Paul Heckingbottom, who only held the post for seven months. Jack Ross was appointed on 15 November 2019.

=== 2020s: Managerial turnover ===
Hibs finished seventh in a 2019–20 league season that was curtailed by the COVID-19 pandemic. In the following season they finished third in the league and reached the 2021 Scottish Cup final, but this was lost 1–0 to St Johnstone. Ross guided Hibs to the League Cup final later that year, but was sacked 10 days before the final after a run of seven defeats in nine league games. Shaun Maloney was appointed as manager in December 2021, but was himself sacked four months later, having won six games out of nineteen. His successor, Lee Johnson, was appointed manager on 19 May 2022. Hibs finished fifth and qualified for European competition under Johnson, but his "rollercoaster" 15-month spell was ended when the team lost three consecutive games to start the 2023–24 league season.

Following a fourth stint as caretaker manager, David Gray was appointed on a permanent basis in June 2024. After a bad start to the 2024–25 season that had Hibs bottom of the Premiership table in early December, they went on a 17-game unbeaten run that lifted them into a third-place finish and European qualification. Gray again led Hibs to European competition by finishing fifth in 2025–26, but he was sacked in September 2026 after a run of home league defeats. He was replaced 8 days later by Dutch manager Marink Reedijk. On 1 November 2026, Reedijk led Hibernian to a 2–1 victory over Heart of Midlothian in the Scottish League Cup semi-final, the club's first win over their city rivals at Hampden Park in the 151 year history of the fixture.

== Colours and badge ==
Green and white have been Hibernian's colours since the club's foundation in 1875. The club has developed a distinct visual identity around its traditional green shirts with contrasting white sleeves, usually accompanied by white shorts and green socks. The original kit was white with an Irish harp on the chest, before Hibernian adopted green and white hoops in 1876. This early design has been described as an inspiration for Celtic's now-famous hooped strip, introduced in 1903. Hibs subsequently switched to plain green shirts before finally adopting white sleeves in 1938, following the example set by Arsenal.

In 1977, Hibernian became the first British top-flight club to display shirt sponsorship, featuring the name of sportswear manufacturer Bukta. Television broadcasters initially refused to show matches involving sponsored shirts, prompting the introduction of an alternative purple-and-white kit. Purple subsequently became a recurring colour for the club's change strips, including several notable designs during the 1990s.

To celebrate its 150th anniversary in 2025, Hibernian released a limited-edition white heritage shirt inspired by its original 1875 kit, alongside a green-and-white hooped design recreating the club's early colours. The latter was worn for a special match against Dundee United at Easter Road in September 2025.

The current club badge, introduced in 2000, brings together three symbols of Hibernian's heritage: the Irish harp representing its origins, a ship symbolising the Port of Leith, and a castle representing Edinburgh. The harp is also central to a longstanding supporters' legend involving a so-called "gypsy curse", said to have been placed on the club after a harp emblem was removed from Easter Road during renovations in the 1950s. According to the legend, Hibernian would not win another Scottish Cup until the harp was restored. In 2015, a harp mosaic and large club crests were reinstated at the stadium. In the very first Scottish Cup campaign following their return, Hibernian lifted the trophy, ending a 114-year wait.

Period	Kit manufacturer	Shirt sponsor (front)	Shirt sponsor (sleeve)
1976–1977	Bukta	No sponsor	No sponsor
1977–1980	Bukta	Bukta	No sponsor
1980–1981	Umbro	No sponsor	No sponsor
1981–1984	Umbro	Fisher's Alfa Romeo	No sponsor
1984–1985	Umbro	No sponsor	No sponsor
1985–1986	Umbro	Insave	No sponsor
1986–1987	Umbro	P&D Windows	No sponsor
1987–1988	Adidas	P&D Windows	No sponsor
1988–1991	Adidas	Frank Graham Group	No sponsor
1991–1992	Adidas	No sponsor	No sponsor
1992–1994	Bukta	Macbean Protective Coating	No sponsor
1994–1996	Mitre	Calor	No sponsor
1996–1998	Mitre	Carlsberg	No sponsor
1998–2004	Le Coq Sportif	Carlsberg	No sponsor
2004–2009	Le Coq Sportif	Whyte & Mackay	No sponsor
2009–2010	Le Coq Sportif	McEwan Fraser	No sponsor
2010–2011	Puma	McEwan Fraser	No sponsor
2011–2013	Puma	Crabbie's	No sponsor
2013–2014	Nike	Crabbie's	No sponsor
2014–2017	Nike	Marathon Bet	No sponsor
2017–2019	Macron	Marathon Bet	No sponsor
2019–2020	Macron	Hibernian Community Foundation	No sponsor
2020–2021	Macron	Thank You NHS	No sponsor
2021–2023	Joma	Utilita	No sponsor
2023–2024	Joma	Bevvy.com	No sponsor
2024–2026	Joma	Bevvy.com	SBK
2026–	Reebok	Bevvy.com	SBK

== Stadium ==
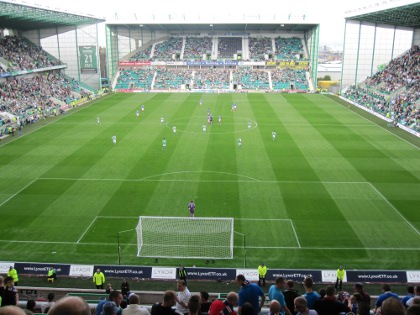
Easter Road in 2010.

Hibs played on The Meadows for the first two years of their history, before moving to grounds in Newington (Mayfield Park) and Bonnington Road, Leith (Powderhall), in different spells between 1877 and 1879. After the lease on Mayfield Park expired, Hibs moved to a ground known as Hibernian Park, on what is now Bothwell Street in Leith. Hibs failed to secure the ground lease and a builder started constructing houses on the site in 1890. Hibs obtained a lease on a site that is now known as Easter Road in 1892 and have played their home matches there since February 1893.

Before the Taylor Report demanded that the stadium be all-seated, Easter Road had vast banks of terracing on three sides, which meant that it could hold crowds in excess of 60,000. The record attendance of 65,860, which is also a record for a football match played in Edinburgh, was set by an Edinburgh derby played on 2 January 1950. Such vast crowds were drawn by the success of the Famous Five.

The pitch had a pronounced slope, but this was removed in 2000. The ground is currently all-seated and has a capacity of 20,421. Easter Road is a modern stadium, with all four of its stands having been built since 1995. The most recent redevelopment was the construction of a new East Stand in 2010.

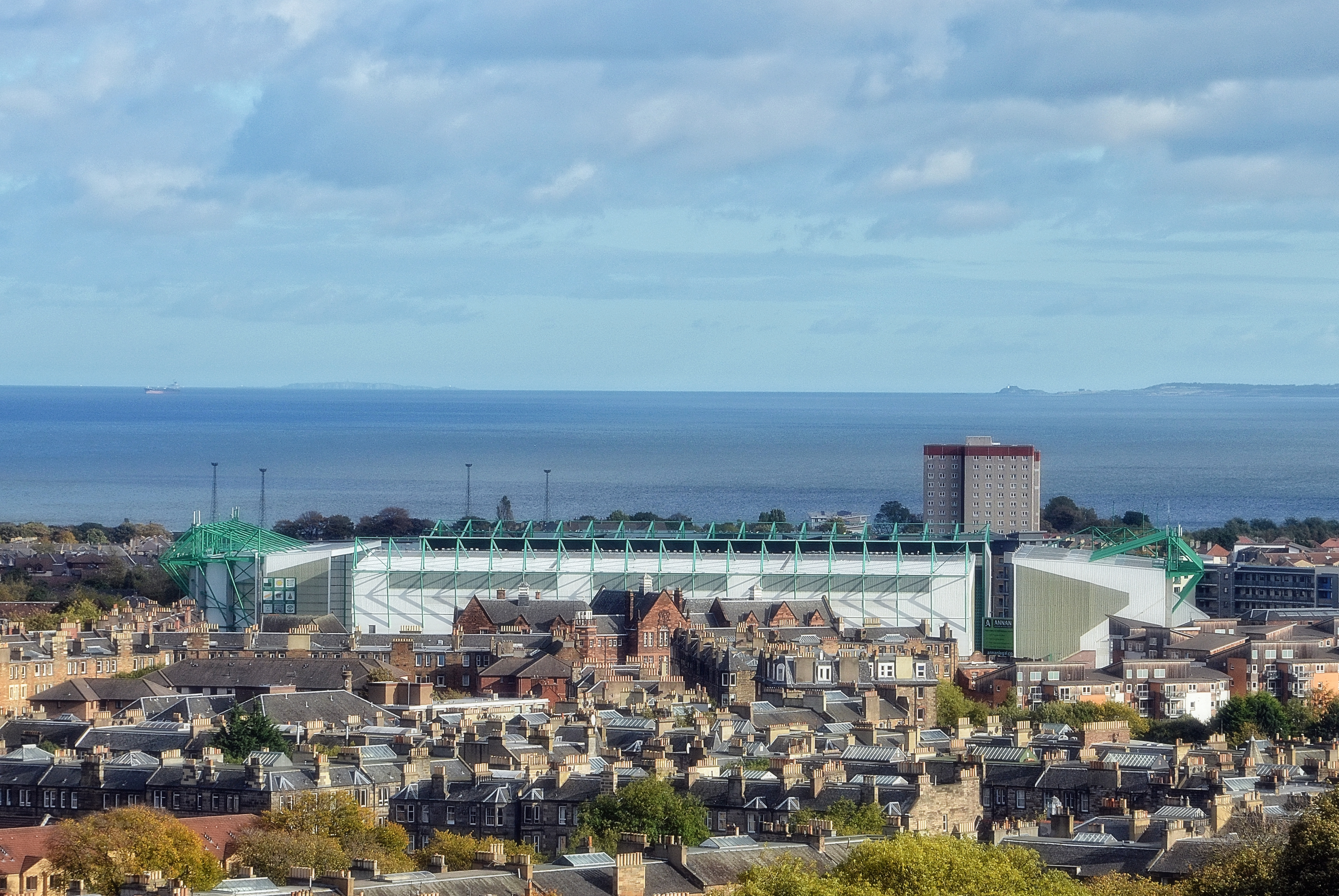
Easter Road as seen from Calton Hill

Scotland have played seven of their home matches at Easter Road, between 1998 and 2017. Scotland women played their first match at Easter Road in August 2019, a Euro 2022 qualifying match against Cyprus. The ground has hosted one international not involving the Scotland teams, a friendly played between Ghana and South Korea preceding the 2006 FIFA World Cup. Easter Road has also sometimes been used as a neutral venue for Scottish League Cup semi-final matches and once hosted a Scottish Challenge Cup final.

== Rivalry ==
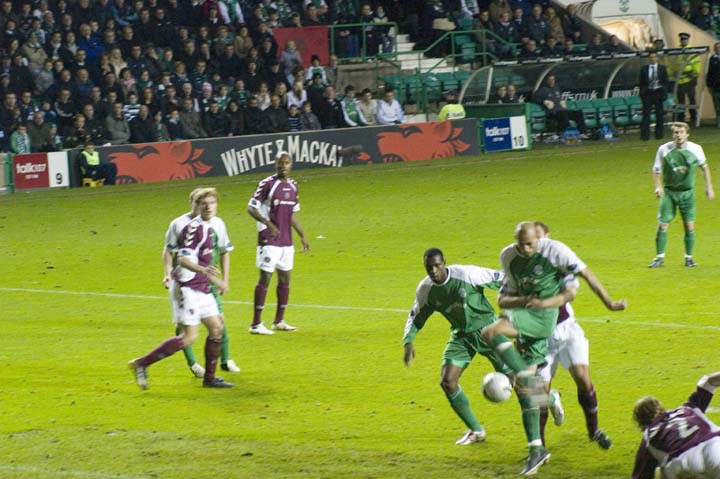
Rob Jones scores a goal for Hibs against Hearts in 2006.

Hibernian shares a rivalry with fellow Edinburgh club Heart of Midlothian, with whom they contest the Edinburgh derby, one of the oldest rivalries in world football. The fixture dates to Christmas Day 1875, when the clubs first met at The Meadows in Hibernian's first recorded match. The clubs are traditionally associated with different parts of Edinburgh, Hibernian with Leith and Heart of Midlothian with Gorgie. Football journalist Graham Spiers has described the derby as "one of the jewels of the Scottish game".

The clubs have contested two Scottish Cup finals, in 1896 and 2012, both won by Heart of Midlothian. The 1896 final, held in Edinburgh, remains the only Scottish Cup final played outside Glasgow. Although Heart of Midlothian hold the better overall head-to-head record, Hibernian achieved the largest victory in a competitive derby, winning 7–0 at Tynecastle on New Year's Day 1973.

The rivalry was further intensified by an unsuccessful 1990 takeover bid for Hibernian by Heart of Midlothian chairman Wallace Mercer, which prompted the "Hands Off Hibs" campaign. Although historically associated with religious and ethnic divisions, the modern rivalry is shaped more by geography, local identity and perceptions of social class than by sectarianism.

== Supporters ==
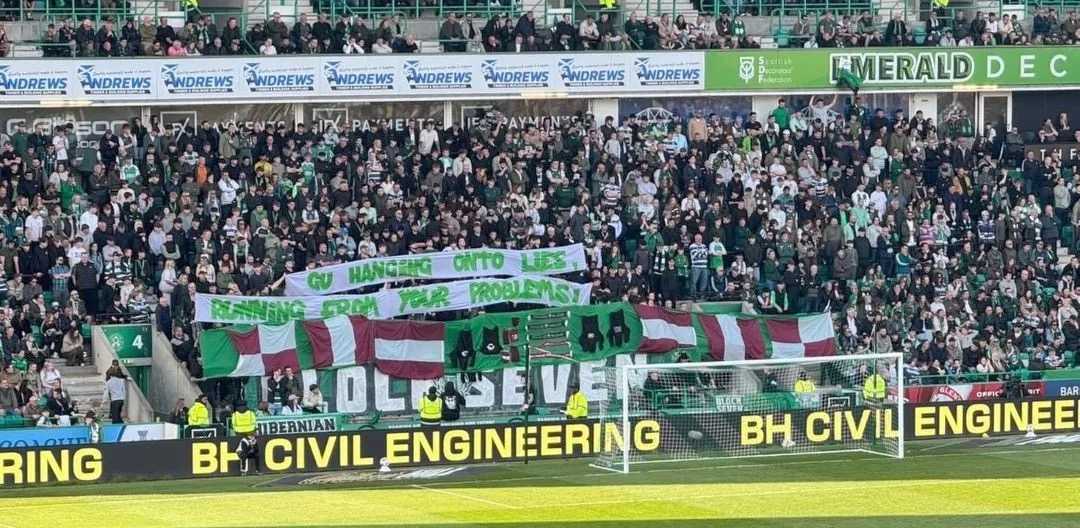
Block Seven during an Edinburgh derby match on 26 April 2026.

Hibernian have a longstanding supporter base with strong roots in Leith, north and eastern Edinburgh, as well as followings across the Lothians, Fife and Scottish Borders.

Hibernian have historically attracted some of the largest crowds in Scottish football. A Scottish Cup semi-final against Rangers in March 1948 attracted more than 143,000 spectators to Hampden Park, a record attendance for a Scottish Cup match outside the final. The club regularly averaged more than 20,000 spectators in the years following the Second World War, averaging a high of 31,567 during the 1951–52 season. Following the redevelopment of Easter Road into an all-seater stadium, average home league attendances reached 18,510 in 2025–26.

During the 1980s and 1990s, a minority of Hibernian's supporters became associated with the Capital City Service (CCS), one of Britain's most prominent football casual groups. The group has been the subject of several books, including Derek Dykes' These Colours Don't Run (2007) and Andy Blance's Hibs Boy (2010). The club's modern ultras group, Block Seven, was established in 2021 and has become known for organised vocal support, banners and large-scale tifo displays at Easter Road and away matches.

Supporters played a significant role in the 1990 Hands Off Hibs campaign, which opposed a proposed takeover of Hibernian by Wallace Mercer, chairman of Heart of Midlothian. The supporter-owned organisation Hibernian Supporters (HSL), established in 2015, has since invested more than £3 million in the club and holds approximately 7% of its shares on behalf of its members.

=== Sunshine on Leith ===
One of Hibernian's most celebrated traditions is the supporters' singing of Sunshine on Leith, the 1988 song by Scottish duo the Proclaimers. The song became closely associated with the club during the 1990s and is traditionally sung following significant victories at Easter Road and in cup finals.

Its most famous rendition followed Hibernian's 3–2 victory over Rangers in the 2016 Scottish Cup final, ending the club's 114-year wait to lift the trophy. The emotional scenes at Hampden Park attracted widespread acclaim, with former Manchester United manager Sir Alex Ferguson declaring: "I don't think there's a better football celebration ever in the game." A recording of the supporters' singing had attracted approximately 3.8 million views on YouTube by October 2026.

In 2018, Sunshine on Leith won BBC Radio 6 Music's Football Anthems World Cup, being voted the UK's favourite football anthem. Its international recognition has extended beyond football: in 2025, Coldplay performed a cover with singer Laura Mvula on BBC Radio 2, with frontman Chris Martin explaining that footage of Hibernian supporters singing the song had deeply moved him.

=== Notable supporters ===
Hibernian have a number of well-known supporters, including Trainspotting author Irvine Welsh, Scottish musical duo the Proclaimers, and tennis champions Sir Andy Murray and brother Jamie Murray. The family alongside their mother, tennis coach Judy Murray, have a longstanding family connection to Hibs through Judy's father, Roy Erskine, who played for the club in the 1950s. In 2018, Andy Murray became involved in mentoring Hibernian academy players Ryan Porteous and Fraser Murray.

Other notable supporters include comedian and Love Island narrator Iain Stirling, comedians Andrew Maxwell and Jack Docherty, actor Dougray Scott, former world boxing champion Josh Taylor, former Scotland international Pat Nevin, and broadcaster Grant Stott. Other well-known fans include former Marillion singer Fish, singer Finley Quaye, Louis Abbott of Admiral Fallow, television presenter John Leslie, and former MSP Lloyd Quinan.

Golf figures associated with the club include former Ryder Cup captain Bernard Gallacher and the late broadcaster Renton Laidlaw. Gallacher's daughter, television presenter Kirsty Gallacher, became a patron of Hibernian Ladies in 2013.

== In popular culture ==
=== Literature ===
Hibernian feature prominently in the works of Scottish author Irvine Welsh, particularly Trainspotting, in which several characters are supporters of the club. Hibs and their supporters also feature in Welsh's The Acid House, including the story of Coco Bryce, a member of the Capital City Service. The club's appearances in the 2012 and 2016 Scottish Cup finals are referenced in his novels A Decent Ride and Dead Men's Trousers, respectively.

Hibernian are also referenced in Ian Rankin's Inspector Rebus novels. Detective Sergeant Siobhan Clarke, a recurring character in the series, is a Hibernian supporter.

=== Film and theatre ===
Hibernian shirts and memorabilia feature throughout Danny Boyle's 1996 film Trainspotting. Francis Begbie, played by Robert Carlyle, wears a Hibs shirt during a five-a-side football scene, while posters and photographs associated with the club can be seen in Mark Renton's bedroom.

Hibs also feature in the 2017 sequel, T2 Trainspotting. In a sequence celebrating the career of former Hibernian and Manchester United player George Best, Sick Boy and Renton are depicted wearing Hibs and Manchester United shirts respectively.

In Jonathan Glazer's 2013 science-fiction film Under the Skin, starring Scarlett Johansson, one of the men encountered by Johansson's character wears a Hibernian shirt.

The stage musical Sunshine on Leith, written by Stephen Greenhorn and first performed in 2007, features music by the Proclaimers. In the 2013 film adaptation, directed by Dexter Fletcher, several principal characters are depicted as Hibernian supporters.

=== Music ===
The Hibs anthem "Glory, Glory to the Hibees" was recorded by Scottish comedian Hector Nicol to the tune of "The Battle Hymn of the Republic". Hibernian have been credited with being the first football club to record their own version of the tune, which was subsequently adopted as an anthem by other clubs, including Tottenham Hotspur and Manchester United.

Hibernian are mentioned in several songs by the Proclaimers. Their song "Cap in Hand", from the album Sunshine on Leith, references former Hibs goalkeeper Andy Goram:

I can understand why Stranraer lie so lowly
They could save a lot of points by signing Hibs' goalie

"Joyful Kilmarnock Blues", from the duo's debut album This Is the Story, describes a journey to an away match against Kilmarnock.

I'd never been to Ayrshire
I hitched down one Saturday
Sixty miles to Kilmarnock
Just to see Hibernian play

Former Marillion singer Fish also references Easter Road in "Lucky", from his 1991 album Internal Exile.

A Hibernian shirt appears among the crowd in the music video for "No Sleep Tonight", a 2009 single by English rock band Enter Shikari.

=== Television ===
Hibernian feature in the HBO television drama Succession. In the second-season episode "Dundee" (2019), Roman Roy, played by Kieran Culkin, purchases Heart of Midlothian as a gift for his father, Logan Roy, played by Brian Cox, only to discover that Logan is a lifelong Hibs supporter.

In the 2000s television adaptation of Ian Rankin's Rebus novels, Inspector John Rebus, played by Ken Stott, is portrayed as a Hibernian supporter.

Hibs are also referenced in the BBC Scotland comedy Scot Squad, in which Chief Commissioner Cameron Miekelson, played by comedian Jack Docherty, is a Hibernian supporter. One storyline involves allegations that Miekelson charges Hearts more for policing because of his football allegiance.

=== Video games ===
The rival Grove Street Families and Ballas gangs in the 2004 video game Grand Theft Auto: San Andreas have been suggested to represent Hibernian and Heart of Midlothian, with the gangs' green and purple colours resembling those of the Edinburgh rivals. The game's developer, Rockstar North, is based in Edinburgh.

== Ownership and finances ==
Although the football club was formed in 1875, it was not incorporated until 1903. (Note: Hibernian FC was registered on 11 April 1903 with Companies House as The Hibernian Football Club Limited, company number SC005323.) The club remained a private company until 1988, when it was publicly listed on the London Stock Exchange. This public listing, combined with poor financial performance, made Hibs vulnerable to an attempted takeover in 1990 by Hearts chairman Wallace Mercer. This attempt was averted when Mercer was unable to acquire the 75% shareholding needed to liquidate the company. The club's parent company, Forth Investments plc, entered receivership in 1991 and Sir Tom Farmer acquired control of the club from the receiver for £3 million. Farmer funded redevelopments of Easter Road and financial losses made by Hibs, although he delegated control to other figures such as Rod Petrie.

In December 2014, the club said it intended to sell up to 51% ownership of the club to its supporters. By November 2017, supporters had increased their shareholding in the club to 34%. The majority ownership of the club was sold in July 2019 to Peruvian-born US-based businessman Ronald Gordon, who became the executive chairman. On 21 February 2023 Hibernian announced that Gordon had died of cancer at the age of 68, and his majority shareholding was passed to his family.

The agm held in February 2024 ratified a deal with Black Knight, the majority shareholder of English club AFC Bournemouth. The Gordon family retained majority control (60%), with Black Knight acquiring 25% for a £6 million investment. Minority shareholders, such as fans group Hibernian Supporters Limited, saw their holdings diluted. Black Knight sold their holding to the Gordon family in November 2025, with "philosophical differences" cited for the partnership breaking down.

== Players ==
=== First team squad ===
As of 7 October 2026

Note: Flags indicate national team as defined under FIFA eligibility rules; some limited exceptions apply. Players may hold more than one non-FIFA nationality.

No.	Pos.	Nation	Player
1	GK	AUT	Raphael Sallinger
3	DF	ENG	Adam Mayor
4	DF	SCO	Grant Hanley
5	DF	SRB	Marko Ivezić
6	DF	SCO	Jason Kerr
7	FW	IRL	Owen Elding
8	MF	SCO	Josh Mulligan
9	FW	ENG	Nathan Lowe (on loan from Stoke City)
10	FW	AUS	Martin Boyle (vice-captain)
11	MF	ENG	Joe Newell
12	DF	WAL	Alex Williams (on loan from West Bromwich Albion)
13	GK	ENG	Jordan Smith
14	MF	ZAM	Miguel Chaiwa
15	DF	AUS	Jack Iredale

No.	Pos.	Nation	Player
17	MF	IRL	Jamie McGrath
18	FW	TOG	Thibault Klidjé
19	MF	SCO	Nicky Cadden
21	DF	UGA	Jordan Obita
22	FW	AUS	Ante Šuto
23	MF	ENG	Callum Wright
24	MF	IRL	Jacob Devaney (on loan from Manchester United)
25	DF	GER	Felix Passlack (captain)
27	DF	ENG	Kanayo Megwa
31	GK	SCO	Murray Johnson
33	DF	COD	Rocky Bushiri
35	GK	SCO	Freddie Owens
39	FW	WAL	Rabbi Matondo
47	MF	SLE	Azeem Abdulai

=== On loan ===
Note: Flags indicate national team as defined under FIFA eligibility rules; some limited exceptions apply. Players may hold more than one non-FIFA nationality.

No.	Pos.	Nation	Player
20	MF	SCO	Rudi Molotnikov (on loan at Arbroath)
30	MF	SCO	Jacob MacIntyre (on loan at Arbroath)
32	MF	SCO	Josh Campbell (on loan at St Johnstone)
34	MF	SCO	Zach Bruce (co-operation loan with Stranraer)
37	DF	SCO	Joseph McGrath (on loan at Alloa Athletic)

No.	Pos.	Nation	Player
48	GK	SCO	Ryan Mallon (on loan at Bonnyrigg Rose)
49	DF	SCO	Lewis Gillie (co-operation loan with Stranraer)
50	MF	SCO	Adam Buckley (on-loan at Gala Fairydean Rovers)
59	DF	SCO	Jaden Riddle (on-loan at Gala Fairydean Rovers)

=== Women's team ===
The club that became the Hibernian women's team was founded in 1997 by Iain Johnston and Paul Johnston, but for the initial two seasons of its existence the club was under the auspices of Preston Athletic. The name changed to Hibernian Ladies in 1999 and they became one of the leading women's teams in Scotland.

Hibernian won the Scottish Women's Cup in 2010, for the fifth time in eight years. Their success in the national cup competition was contrasted to the male affiliate, who went over a century without winning the equivalent competition until their victory in 2016. Hibernian Ladies won domestic cup doubles in 2016, 2017 and 2018.

Ahead of the 2020 season, the club was rebranded as Hibernian Women and players were offered their first part-time professional contracts. The women's first team was fully integrated into the men's club in July 2022, with the youth sides still being run by the Hibernian Community Foundation.

== Club officials ==
=== First team coaching staff ===
Position	Staff
Head coach	(Netherlands) Marink Reedijk
Performance manager	(Netherlands) Rogier Molhoek
First team coach	(Scotland) Brian McLaughlin
Goalkeeping coach	(Scotland) Scott Thomson
Individual development plan coach	(France) Guillaume Beuzelin

=== Board of directors ===
Chairman	Ian Gordon
Non-executive vice-chairman	Kathrin Hamilton
Chief executive officer	Dan Barnett
Non-executive director	Jim Brydon
Non-executive director	Colin Gordon
Non-executive director	Malcolm McPherson
Non-executive director	Leslie Robb

=== Backroom staff ===
Position	Staff
Sporting director	Malky Mackay
Head of recruitment	Garvan Stewart
Technical performance manager	David Marshall
Academy director	Gareth Evans
Head of professional phase academy	James McDonaugh
U18 head coach	Darren McGregor
Head of performance	Nathan Ring
Physical performance manager	Liam Jukes
First team performance analyst	Dom Howes
Physical performance coach	Aaron Gilfillan
Head physiotherapist	Lewis Grant
Physiotherapists	Euan Duffy; Rory Scott

== Noted players ==
Lewis Stevenson holds the record for most league appearances for Hibs, passing 450 in 2023, taking the place of Arthur Duncan who made 446. All of the Famous Five – Gordon Smith, Eddie Turnbull, Lawrie Reilly, Bobby Johnstone and Willie Ormond – scored more than 100 league goals for Hibs.

Hibernian players have been capped at full international level for 36 different national teams, with 70 Hibernian players appearing for Scotland. Hibernian rank fifth amongst all clubs in providing players for Scotland, behind the Old Firm, Hearts and Queen's Park. James Lundie and James McGhee were the first Hibs players to play for Scotland, in an 1885–86 British Home Championship match against Wales. Lawrie Reilly holds the record for most international caps earned while a Hibs player, making 38 appearances for Scotland between 1949 and 1957. In 1959, Hibs forward Joe Baker became the first player who had not previously played for an English club to win a cap for England.

To mark the club's 135th birthday, the club created a Hall of Fame in 2010. The first group of nominees, including 13 former players, were inducted at a dinner later that year.

== Noted managers ==
From 1875 until 1903, Hibs were managed by a committee, although Dan McMichael, who also acted as treasurer, secretary and physiotherapist, was effectively the manager when the club won the 1902 Scottish Cup and the 1903 league championship. Willie McCartney took charge of part of the league-winning 1947–48 season, but he collapsed and died after a Scottish Cup match in January 1948. Hugh Shaw inherited that team and went on to win three league championships in the late 1940s and early 1950s. Alan Stubbs won the Scottish Cup in 2015–16, ending a 114-year drought in that competition. Eddie Turnbull, Alex Miller and John Collins all won one Scottish League Cup each. Bobby Templeton, Bertie Auld, Alex McLeish and Neil Lennon all won second tier championships.

== Honours ==
=== Major honours ===
Hibs held both the Scottish Cup and the Scottish league championship trophy in early 1903. This team photo was taken at that time.

- Scottish league (tier I) (Note: From 1890 to 1975, the top division of the Scottish football league system was known as Division One, or briefly as Division A. From 1975 to 1998, the top division was the Premier Division and from 1998 to 2013, it was known as the Premier League. Since 2013, the top tier has been known as the Premiership.)
  - Winners (4): 1902–03, 1947–48, 1950–51, 1951–52
  - Runners-up (6): 1896–97, 1946–47, 1949–50, 1952–53, 1973–74, 1974–75
- Scottish Cup
  - Winners (3): 1886–87, 1901–02, 2015–16
  - Runners-up (12): 1895–96, 1913–14, 1922–23, 1923–24, 1946–47, 1957–58, 1971–72, 1978–79, 2000–01, 2011–12, 2012–13, 2020–21
- Scottish League Cup
  - Winners (3): 1972–73, 1991–92, 2006–07
  - Runners-up (8): 1950–51, 1968–69, 1974–75, 1985–86, 1993–94, 2003–04, 2015–16, 2021–22

=== Other honours ===
- Scottish league (tier II): (Note: From 1893 to 1975, Division Two was the second tier of league football. With the introduction of the Premier Division in 1975, the second tier became known as the First Division. Since 2013, the second tier has been named the Championship.) 1893–94, 1894–95, 1932–33, 1980–81, 1998–99, 2016–17
- Drybrough Cup: 1972, 1973
- Summer Cup: 1941, 1964
- Southern League Cup: (Note: The Southern League Cup was a regional competition held during the Second World War.) 1943–44
- East of Scotland Shield: 60 times
- Rosebery Charity Cup: 22 times
- Wilson Cup: 14 times
- Glasgow Merchants Charity Cup: 1902
- Edinburgh Football League: 1901–02
- North-Eastern Cup: 1910–11
- Dunedin Cup: 1921, 1929

== Records ==
=== Attendance ===
- Highest single game attendance: 65,860 vs Hearts, 2 January 1950
- Highest average home attendance: 31,567 in the 1951–52 season
- Highest attendance for any match involving Hibs: 143,570 vs Rangers at Hampden Park, 27 March 1948

=== Single game ===
- Biggest victory: 22–1 vs Black Watch Highlanders, 3 September 1881
- Biggest competitive victory: 15–1 vs Peebles Rovers, 11 February 1961
- Biggest league victory: 11–1 vs Airdrie, 24 October 1959 and vs Hamilton, 6 November 1965
- Biggest defeat: 0–10 vs Rangers, 24 December 1898

=== Caps and appearances ===
As of match played on 15 May 2024

- Most competitive appearances: Gordon Smith, 636
- Most league appearances: Lewis Stevenson, 477
- Most capped player: Lawrie Reilly, 38 for Scotland

=== Goals ===
- Most competitive goals: Gordon Smith, 303
- Most league goals: Lawrie Reilly, 187
- Most competitive goals in a season: Joe Baker, 46 in 1959–60
- Most league goals in a season: Joe Baker, 42 in 1959–60

=== Transfers ===
- Record fee paid: Undisclosed (>£1,000,000) for Thibault Klidjé to Luzern in 2025
- Record fee received: £6,000,000 for Kieron Bowie from Verona in 2026

== See also ==
- Hibernian F.C. in European football
- Hibernian W.F.C.
- Hibernian F.C. Reserves and Academy
- Hibernian Training Centre
- Hibernians F.C. - Maltese professional football club
