= Harry Haddock =

Scottish footballer

Personal information
- Full name: Henry Haddock
- Date of birth: 26 July 1925
- Place of birth: Glasgow, Scotland
- Date of death: 18 December 1998 (aged 73)
- Place of death: Rutherglen, Scotland
- Position: Left back

Senior career*
| Years | Team | Apps | (Gls) |
| 1944–1946 | Exeter City | 1 | (0) |
| 1947–1948 | St Anthony's | | |
| 1948–1949 | Renfrew | | |
| 1949–1963 | Clyde | 531 | (10) |

International career
| 1954–1958 | Scotland | 6 | (0) |
| 1954–1956 | Scottish League XI | 7 | (1) |
| 1955 | Scotland A vs B trial | 1 | (0) |
- * Club domestic league appearances and goals

Henry Haddock (26 July 1925 – 18 December 1998) was a Scottish footballer who played as a left back and spent almost his entire career with Clyde. He was also selected in the Scotland squad for the 1958 FIFA World Cup. He was renowned for his long throw in ability.

== Club career ==
Haddock was born in Glasgow and began his senior career at Exeter City while with the RAF during World War II, stationed in the Midlands. Haddock also appeared for Renfrew Juniors.

He joined Clyde in September 1949 (though a serious injury almost ended his career before it began) and became a reliable fixture in the side over the following 13 seasons, latterly as captain. He enjoyed his fair share of ups and downs during this period: the Bully Wee were relegated in 1950–51, 1955–56 and 1960–61 although they enjoyed an instant return as Second Division champions on each occasion. Haddock also helped his side reach two Scottish Cup Finals, both of which were won. In 1954–55, Celtic were defeated 1–0 in a replay, while in 1957–58, Hibernian were defeated 1–0 at the first attempt. Haddock was voted Rex Kingsley Footballer of the Year for the 1958–59 season, aged 34.

In 14 years as a senior and international footballer, Haddock was never booked, sent off, or even admonished by a referee.

== International career ==
In the 1950s, Haddock along with Tommy Ring, and Archie Robertson were three of 49 junior players to later earn full international honours for that decade.

Haddock made his international debut came against the Mighty Magyars team in 1954. His international career was somewhat less auspicious, as Scotland won only one of the six games he featured in, which included two heavy defeats by England, 7–2 in 1955 and 4–0 in 1958. Following the 7–2 defeat, Haddock was publicly praised by Stanley Matthews for his refusal to resort to foul play. The latter match would prove to be his final international appearance, as despite his selection in the 1958 FIFA World Cup squad, he did not feature in the finals in Sweden.

In addition, Haddock was also selected to play in seven Scottish League XI matches, winning on all seven of his appearances, with his solitary goal from the penalty spot against the Football League XI at Hampden Park in 1955. He was an ever present for Glasgow against Sheffield in the annual inter-city challenge match between 1954 and 1960. Haddock captained the side in the last ever fixture in 1960.

Haddock played in many Scotland XI international trial matches, including games against Scotland B, British Army, and three Scottish clubs.

== Death ==
Haddock died in Rutherglen, Glasgow in 1998.

== Honours ==
Clyde

- Scottish Cup: 1954–55, 1957–58
- Scottish Division Two: 1951–52, 1956–57, 1961–62
- Supplementary Cup: 1951–52
- Friendship Cup: 1960–61 (co-winners)
- Glasgow Cup: 1951–52, 1958–59
  - Runner-up: 1949–50, 1956–57
- Glasgow Charity Cup: 1951–52 1957–58, 1960–61
  - Runner-up: 1958–59

Individual

- Sunday Mail Footballer of the Year: 1959
- SPFA Merit Award: 1991
- Clyde FC Hall of Fame: 2012
