= Scotland national football team results (1940–1959) =

Scotland national football team results
- 1872–1914 (matches 1–113)
- 1920–39 (matches 114–188)
- 1940–59 (matches 189–274)
- 1960–79 (matches 275–432)
- 1980–99 (matches 433–611)
- 2000–19 (matches 612–783)
- 2020–present (matches 784–849)

- Unofficial matches

This article lists the results for the Scotland national football team between 1940 and 1959. Scotland did not play any official matches between 1940 and 1945 because competitive football was suspended for the duration of the Second World War. Several unofficial internationals, some known as Victory Internationals, were played during this time.

== Key ==
Key to matches

- Att. = Match attendance
- (H) = Home ground
- (A) = Away ground
- (N) = Neutral ground

Key to record by opponent

- Pld = Games played
- W = Games won
- D = Games drawn
- L = Games lost
- GF = Goals for
- GA = Goals against

== Results ==
Scotland's score is shown first in each case.

Match number	Date	Venue	Opponents	Score	Competition	Scotland scorers	Att.	Ref.
189	23 January 1946	Hampden Park, Glasgow (H)	Belgium	2–2	Friendly	Jimmy Delaney (2)	48,830	
190	15 May 1946	Hampden Park, Glasgow (H)	Switzerland	3–1	Friendly	Billy Liddell (2), Jimmy Delaney	111,899	
191	19 October 1946	Racecourse Ground, Wrexham (A)	Wales	1–3	British Home Championship	Willie Waddell	29,568	
192	27 November 1946	Hampden Park, Glasgow (H)	Ireland	0–0	British Home Championship		98,776	
193	12 April 1947	Wembley Stadium, London (A)	England	1–1	British Home Championship	Andy McLaren	98,200	
194	18 May 1947	Stade Heysel, Brussels (A)	Belgium	1–2	Friendly	Billy Steel	51,161	
195	24 May 1947	Stade Municipal, Luxembourg (A)	Luxembourg	6–0	Friendly	Bobby Flavell (2), Billy Steel (2), Andy McLaren (2)	4,000	
196	4 October 1947	Windsor Park, Belfast (A)	Ireland	0–2	British Home Championship		52,000	
197	12 November 1947	Hampden Park, Glasgow (H)	Wales	1–2	British Home Championship	Andy McLaren	88,000	
198	10 April 1948	Hampden Park, Glasgow (H)	England	0–2	British Home Championship		135,376	
199	28 April 1948	Hampden Park, Glasgow (H)	Belgium	2–0	Friendly	Bobby Combe, Davie Duncan	70,000	
200	17 May 1948	Wankdorf Stadion, Bern (A)	Switzerland	1–2	Friendly	Leslie Johnston	30,000	
201	23 May 1948	Stade Olympique, Colombes (A)	France	0–3	Friendly		46,032	
202	23 October 1948	Ninian Park, Cardiff (A)	Wales	3–1	British Home Championship	Lawrie Reilly, Willie Waddell (2)	59,911	
203	17 November 1948	Hampden Park, Glasgow (H)	Ireland	3–2	British Home Championship	Billy Houliston (2), Jimmy Mason	93,000	
204	9 April 1949	Wembley Stadium, London (A)	England	3–1	British Home Championship	Jimmy Mason, Billy Steel, Lawrie Reilly	98,188	
205	27 April 1949	Hampden Park, Glasgow (H)	France	2–0	Friendly	Billy Steel (2)	125,683	
206	1 October 1949	Windsor Park, Belfast (A)	Ireland	8–2	British Home Championship (Note: The 1950 British Home Championship also served as a 1950 FIFA World Cup qualification group. Scotland finished second in Group 1 and qualified for the 1950 FIFA World Cup. The Scottish Football Association (SFA) had declared, however, that it would only send the team to the World Cup if they had won the British Championship. Despite protests from some players that Scotland should participate in the World Cup, the SFA adhered to its position and withdrew the team from the tournament.)	Henry Morris (3), Willie Waddell (2), Billy Steel, Lawrie Reilly, Jimmy Mason	50,000	
207	9 November 1949	Hampden Park, Glasgow (H)	Wales	2–0	British Home Championship	John McPhail, Alec Linwood	73,782	
208	15 April 1950	Hampden Park, Glasgow (H)	England	0–1	British Home Championship		133,300	
209	26 April 1950	Hampden Park, Glasgow (H)	Switzerland	3–1	Friendly	Willie Bauld, Bobby Campbell, Allan Brown	123,751	
210	21 May 1950	Estádio Nacional, Lisbon (A)	Portugal	2–2	Friendly	Willie Bauld, Allan Brown	68,000	
211	27 May 1950	Stade Olympique, Colombes (A)	France	1–0	Friendly	Allan Brown	35,568	
212	21 October 1950	Ninian Park, Cardiff (A)	Wales	3–1	British Home Championship	Lawrie Reilly (2), Billy Liddell	60,000	
213	1 November 1950	Hampden Park, Glasgow (H)	Northern Ireland	6–1	British Home Championship	John McPhail (2), Billy Steel (4)	83,142	
214	13 December 1950	Hampden Park, Glasgow (H)	Austria	0–1	Friendly		68,000	
215	14 April 1951	Wembley Stadium, London (A)	England	3–2	British Home Championship	Bobby Johnstone, Lawrie Reilly, Billy Liddell	98,000	
216	12 May 1951	Hampden Park, Glasgow (H)	Denmark	3–1	Friendly	Billy Steel, Lawrie Reilly, Bobby Mitchell	75,690	
217	16 May 1951	Hampden Park, Glasgow (H)	France	1–0	Friendly	Lawrie Reilly	75,394	
218	20 May 1951	Stade Heysel, Brussels (A)	Belgium	5–0	Friendly	George Hamilton (3), Jimmy Mason, Willie Waddell	55,135	
219	27 May 1951	Praterstadion, Vienna (A)	Austria	0–4	Friendly		65,000	
220	6 October 1951	Windsor Park, Belfast (A)	Northern Ireland	3–0	British Home Championship	Tommy Orr, Bobby Johnstone (2)	56,946	
221	14 November 1951	Hampden Park, Glasgow (H)	Wales	0–1	British Home Championship		71,272	
222	5 April 1952	Hampden Park, Glasgow (H)	England	1–2	British Home Championship	Lawrie Reilly	134,504	
223	30 April 1952	Hampden Park, Glasgow (H)	United States	6–0	Friendly	Lawrie Reilly (3), Ian McMillan (2), Own goal	107,765	
224	25 May 1952	Idrætsparken, Copenhagen (A)	Denmark	2–1	Friendly	Willie Thornton, Lawrie Reilly	39,000	
225	30 May 1952	Råsunda Stadion, Solna (A)	Sweden	1–3	Friendly	Billy Liddell	32,122	
226	18 October 1952	Ninian Park, Cardiff (A)	Wales	2–1	British Home Championship	Allan Brown, Billy Liddell	60,000	
227	3 November 1952	Hampden Park, Glasgow (H)	Northern Ireland	1–1	British Home Championship	Lawrie Reilly	65,057	
228	18 April 1953	Wembley Stadium, London (A)	England	2–2	British Home Championship	Lawrie Reilly (2)	97,000	
229	6 May 1953	Hampden Park, Glasgow (H)	Sweden	1–2	Friendly	Bobby Johnstone	83,800	
230	3 October 1953	Windsor Park, Belfast (A)	Northern Ireland	3–1	British Home Championship (Note: The 1954 British Home Championship also served as a 1954 FIFA World Cup qualification group. Scotland finished second in UEFA Group 3 and qualified for the 1954 FIFA World Cup.)	Charlie Fleming (2), Jackie Henderson	58,248	
231	4 November 1953	Hampden Park, Glasgow (H)	Wales	3–3	British Home Championship	Allan Brown, Bobby Johnstone, Lawrie Reilly	71,378	
232	3 April 1954	Hampden Park, Glasgow (H)	England	2–4	British Home Championship	Allan Brown, Willie Ormond	134,544	
233	5 May 1954	Hampden Park, Glasgow (H)	Norway	1–0	Friendly	George Hamilton	25,897	
234	19 May 1954	Ullevaal Stadion, Oslo (A)	Norway	1–1	Friendly	John Mackenzie	23,849	
235	25 May 1954	Olympic Stadium, Helsinki (A)	Finland	2–1	Friendly	Willie Ormond, Bobby Johnstone	21,685	
236	16 June 1954	Hardturm, Zürich (N)	Austria	0–1	World Cup		25,000	
237	19 June 1954	St. Jakob Stadium, Basel (N)	Uruguay	0–7	World Cup		34,000	
238	16 October 1954	Ninian Park, Cardiff (A)	Wales	1–0	British Home Championship	Paddy Buckley	53,000	
239	3 November 1954	Hampden Park, Glasgow (H)	Northern Ireland	2–2	British Home Championship	Jimmy Davidson, Bobby Johnstone	46,200	
240	8 December 1954	Hampden Park, Glasgow (H)	Hungary	2–4	Friendly	Tommy Ring, Bobby Johnstone	113,146	
241	2 April 1955	Wembley Stadium, London (A)	England	2–7	British Home Championship	Lawrie Reilly, Tommy Docherty	96,847	
242	4 May 1955	Hampden Park, Glasgow (H)	Portugal	3–0	Friendly	Tommy Gemmell, Billy Liddell, Lawrie Reilly	20,858	
243	15 May 1955	Stadion JNA, Belgrade (A)	Yugoslavia	2–2	Friendly	Lawrie Reilly, Gordon Smith	20,000	
244	19 May 1955	Praterstadion, Vienna (A)	Austria	4–1	Friendly	Archie Robertson, Gordon Smith, Billy Liddell, Lawrie Reilly	65,000	
245	29 May 1955	Nepstadion, Budapest (A)	Hungary	1–3	Friendly	Gordon Smith	102,000	
246	8 October 1955	Windsor Park, Belfast (A)	Northern Ireland	1–2	British Home Championship	Lawrie Reilly	48,000	
247	9 November 1955	Hampden Park, Glasgow (H)	Wales	2–0	British Home Championship	Bobby Johnstone (2)	53,887	
248	14 April 1956	Hampden Park, Glasgow (H)	England	1–1	British Home Championship	Graham Leggat	132,817	
249	2 May 1956	Hampden Park, Glasgow (H)	Austria	1–1	Friendly	Alfie Conn, Sr.	80,509	
250	20 October 1956	Ninian Park, Cardiff (A)	Wales	2–2	British Home Championship	Willie Fernie, Lawrie Reilly	60,000	
251	7 November 1956	Hampden Park, Glasgow (H)	Northern Ireland	1–0	British Home Championship	Alex Scott	62,035	
252	21 November 1956	Hampden Park, Glasgow (H)	Yugoslavia	2–0	Friendly	Jackie Mudie, Sammy Baird	55,500	
253	6 April 1957	Wembley Stadium, London (A)	England	1–2	British Home Championship	Tommy Ring	97,520	
254	8 May 1957	Hampden Park, Glasgow (H)	Spain	4–2	World Cup qualification	Jackie Mudie (3), John Hewie	88,890	
255	19 May 1957	St. Jakob Stadium, Basel (A)	Switzerland	2–1	World Cup qualification	Jackie Mudie, Bobby Collins	48,000	
256	22 May 1957	Neckarstadion, Stuttgart (A)	West Germany	3–1	Friendly	Bobby Collins (2), Jackie Mudie	76,000	
257	26 May 1957	Santiago Bernabéu Stadium, Madrid (A)	Spain	1–4	World Cup qualification	Gordon Smith	90,000	
258	5 October 1957	Windsor Park, Belfast (A)	Northern Ireland	1–1	British Home Championship	Graham Leggat	50,000	
259	6 November 1957	Hampden Park, Glasgow (H)	Switzerland	3–2	World Cup qualification	Archie Robertson, Jackie Mudie, Alex Scott	58,811	
260	13 November 1957	Hampden Park, Glasgow (H)	Wales	1–1	British Home Championship	Bobby Collins	42,918	
261	19 April 1958	Hampden Park, Glasgow (H)	England	0–4	British Home Championship		127,874	
262	7 May 1958	Hampden Park, Glasgow (H)	Hungary	1–1	Friendly	Jackie Mudie	54,900	
263	1 June 1958	Dziesieciolecia Stadion, Warsaw (A)	Poland	2–1	Friendly	Bobby Collins (2)	70,000	
264	8 June 1958	Arosvallen, Västerås (N)	Yugoslavia	1–1	World Cup	Jimmy Murray	9,591	
265	11 June 1958	Idrottsparken, Norrköping (N)	Paraguay	2–3	World Cup	Jackie Mudie, Bobby Collins	11,665	
266	15 June 1958	Eyravallen, Örebro (N)	France	1–2	World Cup	Sammy Baird	13,554	
267	18 October 1958	Ninian Park, Cardiff (A)	Wales	3–0	British Home Championship	Graham Leggat, Denis Law, Bobby Collins	59,162	
268	5 November 1958	Hampden Park, Glasgow (H)	Northern Ireland	2–2	British Home Championship	David Herd, Bobby Collins	72,732	
269	11 April 1959	Wembley Stadium, London (A)	England	0–1	British Home Championship		98,329	
270	6 May 1959	Hampden Park, Glasgow (H)	West Germany	3–2	Friendly	John White, Andy Weir, Graham Leggat	103,415	
271	27 May 1959	Olympic Stadium, Amsterdam (A)	Netherlands	2–1	Friendly	Bobby Collins, Graham Leggat	55,000	
272	3 June 1959	Estádio José Alvalade, Lisbon (A)	Portugal	0–1	Friendly		30,000	
273	3 October 1959	Windsor Park, Belfast (A)	Northern Ireland	4–0	British Home Championship	Graham Leggat, John Hewie, John White, George Mulhall	59,000	
274	4 November 1959	Hampden Park, Glasgow (H)	Wales	1–1	British Home Championship	Graham Leggat	55,813	

== Record by opponent ==
Team	Pld	W	D	L	GF	GA	GD	WPCT
Austria	5	1	1	3	5	8	−3	20.00
Belgium	4	2	1	1	10	4	+6	50.00
Denmark	2	2	0	0	5	2	+3	100.00
England	13	2	3	8	16	30	−14	15.38
Finland	1	1	0	0	2	1	+1	100.00
France	5	3	0	2	5	5	0	60.00
Hungary	3	0	1	2	4	8	−4	0.00
Ireland	4	2	1	1	11	6	+5	50.00
Luxembourg	1	1	0	0	6	0	+6	100.00
Netherlands	1	1	0	0	2	1	+1	100.00
Northern Ireland	10	5	4	1	24	10	+14	50.00
Norway	2	1	1	0	2	1	+1	50.00
Paraguay	1	0	0	1	2	3	−1	0.00
Poland	1	1	0	0	2	1	+1	100.00
Portugal	3	1	1	1	5	3	+2	33.33
Spain	2	1	0	1	5	6	−1	50.00
Sweden	2	0	0	2	2	5	−3	0.00
Switzerland	5	4	0	1	12	7	+5	80.00
United States	1	1	0	0	6	0	+6	100.00
Uruguay	1	0	0	1	0	7	−7	0.00
Wales	14	7	4	3	25	16	+9	50.00
West Germany	2	2	0	0	6	3	+3	100.00
Yugoslavia	3	1	2	0	5	3	+2	33.33
Total	86	39	19	28	162	130	+32	45.35

Source: Results

== British Home Championship record by season ==
Year	Placing
1946–47	3rd (joint)
1947–48	4th
1948–49	1st
1949–50	2nd
1950–51	1st
1951–52	3rd
1952–53	1st (joint)
1953–54	2nd
1954–55	2nd
1955–56	1st (joint)
1956–57	2nd
1957–58	3rd (joint)
1958–59	3rd
1959–60	1st (joint)
