= Albie Murphy =

Irish footballer (1930–2000)

Personal information
- Full name: Albert Murphy
- Date of birth: November 1930
- Place of birth: Dublin, Ireland
- Date of death: 2000 (aged 69–70)
- Place of death: Dublin, Ireland
- Position: Defender

Senior career*
Years	Team	Apps	(Gls)
1947–1949	Transport		
1949–1951	Clyde		
1951–1952	Shamrock Rovers		
1952–1959	Clyde		
1959–1960	Shamrock Rovers		

International career
1949	League of Ireland XI	1	(0)
1955	Ireland	1	(0)

Managerial career
- Shamrock Rovers
- * Club domestic league appearances and goals

Albert "Albie" Murphy (November 1930 – June 2000) was an Irish professional footballer who played as a defender.

== Career ==
Murphy was born in Dublin. He joined Clyde in Scotland from Transport in 1949, but returned to Ireland with Shamrock Rovers in 1951. He then rejoined Clyde for many years winning the Scottish Cup with them twice in 1955 and 1958.

He resigned for Shamrock Rovers again in September 1959 for £750. Murphy was forced to move as he was barred from Scottish football. He had become a bookmaker and opened a betting shop in Dublin and rendered himself ineligible to continue to play in the Scottish League.

He took over as coach in September 1960 for one season.

Murphy was capped by Ireland once in a friendly on 19 October 1955, playing in a defeat to Yugoslavia at Dalymount Park. In addition, he represented the League of Ireland XI against the Scottish League XI in 1949.

Murphy was known for his fiery temper, with two notable instances of this occurring in games against Rangers. He was sent off at least twice against Rangers in his career, once in a Glasgow Cup final in 1956, where he refused to leave the field and had to be escorted away by the police. He was given a two-month ban by the Scottish Football Association for this incident. On another occasion, Murphy was sent off against Rangers following a fight on the pitch.

== Honours ==
Clyde

- Scottish Cup: 1954–55, 1957–58
- Scottish Division Two: 1956–57
- Glasgow Cup: 1958–59; runner-up: 1956–57
- Glasgow Charity Cup: 1957–58; runner-up: 1958–59
