= Tommy Ring =

Scottish footballer

Personal information
- Full name: Thomas Ring
- Date of birth: 8 August 1930
- Place of birth: Glasgow, Scotland
- Date of death: 5 October 1997 (aged 67)
- Place of death: Glasgow, Scotland
- Position: Outside left

Senior career*
Years	Team	Apps	(Gls)
1948–1949	Ashfield		
1949–1960	Clyde	280	(124)
1960–1961	Everton	27	(6)
1961–1963	Barnsley	21	(1)
1963	Aberdeen	2	(0)
1963–1964	Fraserburgh		
1964–1965	Stevenage Town		

International career
1953–1957	Scotland	12	(2)
1953–1957	Scottish League XI	8	(4)
1952	Scottish League Two XI	1	(2)
- * Club domestic league appearances and goals

Thomas Ring (8 August 1930 – 5 October 1997) was a Scottish footballer, who played at outside left for Ashfield Juniors, Clyde, Everton, Barnsley, Aberdeen, Fraserburgh, Stevenage Town and for Scotland.

== Club career ==
Ring was born in Glasgow and is best known for his time with Clyde, during which he won the Scottish Cup in 1954–55 and also in 1957–58. Ring scored the winning goal in the 1955 Scottish Cup Final replay versus Celtic.

He started out as a promising junior player with Ashfield. After he represented an RAF XI against Blackpool Reserves, an opposition scout tried to recruit him. He'd already joined the Bullywee, but that scout turned out to be ex Clyde captain Danny Blair.

Clyde also won the Division Two title twice in 1951–52 and 1956–57. He scored 178 goals in 384 appearances for the club in national competitions.

Ring was transferred to Everton in January 1960 for £12,000. He made a significant contribution for the Toffees in the 1960–61 season; many headlines were written concerning him, such as 'Blues could just Ring for service'.

Ring departed Goodison Park after a broken leg injury November 1961 and then signed for Barnsley. He returned to Scotland in early 1963 to sign for Aberdeen FC for only a three month spell, and playing just two first team games, before ending his career with further brief spells, signing for Fraserburgh FC in July 1963 in the Scottish Highland Football League, and then for Stevenage Town FC in 1964, in the Southern League.

== International career ==
In the 1950s, Ring along with Harry Haddock, and Archie Robertson, were three of 49 junior players to later earn full international honours for that decade.

Ring was capped a dozen times for Scotland whilst playing for the Bully Wee and scored two goals, with one versus the famous Hungary team with Ferenc Puskás during the 1954–55 season. The other was scored versus England at Wembley in 1957. Ring scored in the first minute, although England went on to win 2–1.

He was the second Division Two player to be capped against the auld enemy, and he remains the last. Five of his twelve caps were awarded in Division Two. Ring also represented the Scottish League XI.

=== International goals ===
Scores and results list for Scotland's, Scottish League XI's, and Glasgow's goal tally first.

No.	Date	Venue	Opponent	Score	Result	Competition
'A' Internationals
1	8 December 1954	Hampden Park, Glasgow	Hungary	1–2	2–4	Challenge match
2	6 April 1957	Wembley Stadium, London	England	1–0	1–2	1956–57 Home Championship
League Internationals
1	17 March 1954	Dalymount Park, Dublin	(Republic of Ireland) League of Ireland XI	3–0	3–1	Challenge match
2	6 September 1956	Windsor Park, Belfast	(Northern Ireland) Irish League XI	2–1	7–1	Challenge match
3	26 September 1956	Shawfield Park, Glasgow	(Republic of Ireland) League of Ireland XI	3–0	3–1	Challenge match
4	13 March 1957	Ibrox Park, Glasgow	(England) The Football League XI	2–1	3–2	Challenge match
'B' League Internationals
1	17 March 1954	Solitude, Belfast	(Northern Ireland) Irish B League XI	2–0	6–0	Challenge match
2	17 March 1954	Solitude, Belfast	(Northern Ireland) Irish B League XI	5–0	6–0	Challenge match
Inter-county matches
1	10 November 1954	Shawfield Park, Glasgow	(England) Sheffield		4–5	Floodlight friendly
2	14 November 1956	Shawfield Park, Glasgow	(England) Sheffield		2–2	Floodlight friendly

== In popular culture ==
Ring's name is now a running gag on BBC Radio Scotland's Off the Ball radio programme, as his surname has multiple connotations. This ensures that he makes it into the show's 'team of the week' almost every Saturday.

== Honours ==
Clyde

- Scottish Cup: 1954–55, 1957–58
- Scottish Division Two: 1951–52, 1956–57
- Supplementary Cup: 1951–52
- Glasgow Cup: 1951–52, 1958–59
- Glasgow Charity Cup: 1951–52, 1957–58

Everton

- Liverpool Senior Cup: 1959–60

Individual

- Clyde FC Hall of Fame: Inducted, 2016
- Abbeyleix Hall of Fame
