= John Buchanan (footballer, born 1928) =

Scottish footballer

Personal information
- Date of birth: 9 June 1928
- Place of birth: Allandale, Scotland
- Date of death: December 2000 (aged 72)
- Place of death: Bradford, West Yorkshire, England
- Position: Forward

Youth career
- Kilsyth Rangers

Senior career*
Years	Team	Apps	(Gls)
1949–1955	Clyde	132	(69)
1955–1957	Derby County	32	(12)
1957–1963	Bradford Park Avenue	164	(67)
Total		328	(148)

International career
1952	Scotland B	1	(0)
1953	Scotland XI	1	(0)
- * Club domestic league appearances and goals

John Buchanan (9 June 1928 – December 2000) was a Scottish football striker.

Buchanan started his career with Clyde, and his prolific form saw him get a move to Derby County. He also played for Bradford Park Avenue, before retiring in 1963.

He is only one of a handful of Clyde players to have scored four goals in a single match.

Derby County won the Third Division North title in 1956–57, but Buchanan only played six league games with a return of five goals.

Buchanan was Bradford's leading scorer with 21 goals from 42 games (in 1960–61), as the team won promotion to the Third Division. He was also top scorer with 23 goals in 1958–59.

Buchanan received a Scotland B cap in 1952, when he played against a France B team in a 0–0 draw in Toulouse. In addition, he featured for a Scotland XI in an international trial match against the British Army in 1953.

== Career statistics ==
Appearances and goals by club, season and competition
Club	Season	League			National Cup		League Cup		Other		Total	
Club	Season	Division	Apps	Goals	Apps	Goals	Apps	Goals	Apps	Goals	Apps	Goals
Clyde	1949–50	Scottish Division A	3	1	0	0	0	0	0	0	3	1
Clyde	1950–51	Scottish Division A	27	9	1	0	0	0	2 (Note: Includes Glasgow Cup (1 app) and Glasgow Charity Cup (1 app))	0	30	9
Clyde	1951–52	Scottish Division B	30	17	2	1	6	6	14 (Note: Includes St Mungo Cup (3 apps), Supplementary Cup (5 apps, 7 goals), Glasgow Cup (3 apps, 3 goals) and Glasgow Charity Cup (3 apps))	10	52	34
Clyde	1952–53	Scottish Division A	23	13	2	2	6	5	1 (Note: Includes Glasgow Cup (1 app))	0	32	20
Clyde	1953–54	Scottish Division A	29	16	2	1	5	4	2 (Note: Includes Glasgow Cup (1 app) and Glasgow Charity Cup (1 app))	0	37	19
Clyde	1954–55	Scottish Division A	20	13	0	0	6	3	2 (Note: Includes Glasgow Cup (2 apps, 1 goal))	1	28	17
Clyde	Total		132	69	7	4	23	18	21	11	173	106

== Honours ==
Clyde

- Scottish Division Two: 1951–52
- Supplementary Cup: 1951–52
- Glasgow Cup: 1951–52
  - Runner-up: 1949–50
- Glasgow Charity Cup: 1951–52

Derby County

- English Third Division North: Runner-up 1955–56

Bradford Park

- English Fourth Division: Promoted 1960–61
