= Sammy Baird =

Scottish footballer and manager

Personal information
- Full name: Stuart Samuel Baird
- Date of birth: 13 May 1930
- Place of birth: Denny, Scotland
- Date of death: 21 April 2010 (aged 79)
- Place of death: Bangor, Northern Ireland
- Positions: Inside left; left half

Youth career
- Rutherglen Glencairn

Senior career*
| Years | Team | Apps | (Gls) |
| 1949–1954 | Clyde | 90 | (25) |
| 1954–1955 | Preston North End | 15 | (2) |
| 1955–1960 | Rangers | 122 | (39) |
| 1960–1962 | Hibernian | 39 | (5) |
| 1962–1963 | Third Lanark | 24 | (1) |
| 1963–1964 | Stirling Albion | 12 | (1) |
| Total | | 302 | (73) |

International career
| 1954–1958 | Scottish League XI | 5 | (1) |
| 1956–1958 | Scotland | 7 | (2) |
| 1958 | SFA trial v SFL | 1 | (0) |

Managerial career
- 1963–1968: Stirling Albion
- * Club domestic league appearances and goals

Stuart Samuel Baird (13 May 1930 – 21 April 2010) was a Scottish football player and manager.

== Career ==
During his playing career he played for Clyde, Preston North End, Rangers, Hibernian, Third Lanark and Stirling Albion. He won three Scottish league titles (1956, 1957 and 1959) and one Scottish Cup (1960) with Rangers.

Baird won the Division Two title in 1951–52 with Clyde. Baird scored five times for Rangers as they reached the 1959–60 European Cup semi finals and was influential for Hibernian on their run to the 1960–61 Inter-Cities Fairs Cup semi finals. Preston paid £12,000 for his signature and Rangers paid £10,000 for his services. Hibs then forked out £5,000 for him.

== International career ==
He earned seven international caps for Scotland from 1956 to 1958. He scored on his debut against Yugoslavia, and also in his last match, a 2–1 defeat by France in the 1958 FIFA World Cup. The latter goal was the first time a Rangers player scored in a World Cup Finals match. He remains the only Rangers player to do so for Scotland in open play.

Additionally, Baird represented the Scottish League XI on five occasions. He scored in his last appearance against the Football League XI at Ibrox in 1958.

He earned earlier representative honours with Clyde. In 1953 against the British Army, Baird converted a penalty for Scotland XI in 2–2 draw at Goodison Park. As preparation for the FIFA World Cup, Baird played for a Scotland XI in a couple of trial matches in 1958.

== Manager ==
As Stirling Albion manager, Baird led the team to promotion to Division One winning the Division Two title in 1964–65.

His Albion team became the first British and first professional team to tour Japan in 1966. The results of the two-match tour were 3–1 against a Japanese All Stars XI and 4–2 against the Japan national team.

He was later sacked in 1968 because the club were heading for relegation back to Division Two.

== Personal life ==
Baird died on the morning of 21 April 2010.

== Honours ==
=== Player ===
Clyde

- Scottish Division Two: 1951–52
- Supplementary Cup: 1951–52
- Glasgow Cup: 1951–52
  - Runner-up: 1949–50
- Glasgow Charity Cup: 1951–52

Rangers

- Scottish Division One: 1955–56, 1956–57, 1958–59
- Scottish Cup: 1959–60
- Scottish League Cup:
  - Runner-up: 1957–58
- Glasgow Cup: 1956–57, 1957–58, 1959–60

Hibernian

- East of Scotland Shield: 1960–61

Third Lanark

- Glasgow Cup: 1962–63

=== Manager ===
Stirling Albion

- Scottish Division Two: 1964–65
