= Archie Robertson (footballer) =

Scottish footballer and manager

Personal information
- Full name: Archibald Clark Robertson
- Date of birth: 15 September 1929
- Place of birth: Busby, Scotland
- Date of death: 28 January 1978 (aged 48)
- Position: Inside forward

Youth career
- Rutherglen Glencairn

Senior career*
Years	Team	Apps	(Gls)
1947–1961	Clyde	293	(121)
1961–1963	Greenock Morton	51	(17)
1964–1965	Cowdenbeath	5	(3)
Total		349	(141)

International career
1954	Scottish League XI	2	(1)
1955–1958	Scotland	5	(2)

Managerial career
- 1964–1967: Cowdenbeath
- 1968–1973: Clyde
- * Club domestic league appearances and goals

Archibald Clark Robertson (15 September 1929 – 28 January 1978) was a Scottish footballer who spent most of his career with Clyde, firstly as an inside right and latterly as manager.

== Playing career ==
=== Club ===
Robertson joined Clyde from Junior side Rutherglen Glencairn in 1947 on a part-time basis, as he continued his studies towards a degree in chemistry. He spent the next 14 seasons with the Bully Wee, during which time he experienced relegation on three occasions. More positively, he also helped the side win the Division Two title twice, in 1951–52 and 1956–57.

Robertson also enjoyed success with Clyde in the Scottish Cup. In the 1955 final he scored Clyde's equalising goal direct from a corner kick in the 88th minute, forcing a 1–1 draw with Celtic. Clyde went on to win the replay 1–0 with a goal by Tommy Ring. He also played in the 1958 Cup final when Clyde defeated Hibernian 1–0.

He eventually left the club when signed by Morton for £1,000 in the autumn of his career. A teammate was Allan McGraw, who stated that he "learnt a lot" from Robertson. He spent two seasons in Greenock before retiring in 1963.

=== International ===
In the 1950s, Robertson along with Harry Haddock and Tommy Ring were three of 49 junior players to later earn full international honours for that decade.

While with Clyde, Robertson earned five caps for the Scotland national football team and played in the 1958 FIFA World Cup in Sweden. He also earned selection for the Scottish League representative side on two occasions.

== Manager ==
Robertson began a managerial career with Second Division Cowdenbeath in 1964 and spent three and a half mid-table seasons with the Blue Brazil. In January 1968, he succeeded Davie White as manager of old club Clyde but was not able to replicate White's 1966-67 third-place finish as Clyde's league form gradually declined in the late 1960s and early 1970s. They eventually experienced relegation in the 1971–72 season and, despite leading his team to the Second Division title the following campaign, Robertson ended his association with the club in 1973. His final footballing role was as Tottenham Hotspur's Scottish scout.

== Other work ==
Throughout his career, Robertson combined his footballing role with another career. Following his graduation he worked in the scientific branch of the National Coal Board, while in later years he was a science teacher at Hunter High School in East Kilbride. One of his pupils was future Scotland striker Ally McCoist, who credited the guidance of Robertson (in his role as the school team's coach) in his early development as a player.

== Honours ==
=== Player ===
Clyde

- Scottish Cup: 1954–55, 1957–58
- Scottish Division Two: 1951–52, 1956–57
- Supplementary Cup: 1951–52
- Glasgow Cup: 1951–52, 1958–59
  - runner-up: 1956–57
- Glasgow Charity Cup: 1951–52, 1957–58
  - runner-up: 1958–59

Morton

- Renfrewshire Cup: 1961–62

=== Manager ===
Clyde

- Scottish Division Two: 1972–73
- Glasgow Cup runner-up: 1970–71
