= Brian Ahern (footballer) =

Scottish footballer (born 1952)

Personal information
- Date of birth: 15 November 1952 (age 73)
- Place of birth: Glasgow, Scotland
- Position: Midfielder

Youth career
- St Luke's BC

Senior career*
Years	Team	Apps	(Gls)
1971–1981	Clyde	304	(53)
1981–1983	Ayr United	70	(9)
1983–1987	Clyde	116	(10)
1987–1988	Albion Rovers	33	(0)
- Cambuslang Rangers
Total		523	(72)
- * Club domestic league appearances and goals

Brian Ahern (born 15 November 1952) is a Scottish former football midfielder.

Ahern is best known for his time at Clyde, where he holds the current record for most league appearances in the history of the club, at 420 appearances. He made 504 appearances in all competitions. Ahern was also the captain during the latter stages of his Clyde career, and he captained the side to the Scottish Second Division trophy during their centenary year.

He was the solitary Clyde player selected for a Glasgow Select XI against the Football League XI to mark the Silver Jubilee in 1977, but was an unused substitute. Ahern was picked for the Scotland semi professional team in 1981.

== Honours ==
Clyde

- Scottish Second Division: 1972–73, 1977–78
- Glasgow Cup: runner-up 1970–71

Scotland (semi-pro)

- Four Nations Tournament: runner-up 1981

Individual

- Clyde FC Player of the Year: 1977–78
- Clyde FC Hall of Fame: Inducted, 2015

== See also ==
- List of footballers in Scotland by number of league appearances (500+)
