= Neil Hood =

Scottish footballer and manager

Personal information
- Date of birth: 30 June 1950 (age 76)
- Place of birth: Scotland
- Position: Striker

Youth career
- Annbank United

Senior career*
Years	Team	Apps	(Gls)
1969–1971	Ayr United	21	(7)
1971–1972	Queen of the South	25	(13)
1972–1975	Hamilton Academical	104	(44)
1975–1980	Clyde	151	(69)
1980–1981	Stranraer	29	(10)
1981–1982	Clyde	15	(2)
Total		345	(145)

Managerial career
- 1980–1981: Stranraer
- * Club domestic league appearances and goals

Neil Hood (born 30 June 1950), is a Scottish former footballer who played as a striker.

Hood started his career with Ayr United, before moving to Queen of the South in Dumfries.

In the three years between 1972 and 1975, Hood scored 52 goals for Hamilton Academical before he moved to Clyde.

Hood scored 80 goals in 171 games in his first spell at the Bully Wee, which included a Second Division Championship win in the club's centenary year. Hood then joined Stranraer as manager for season 1980–81 season. This proved to be unsuccessful, and he rejoined Clyde as a player in 1981, helping them to win another Second Division title, but he never received a medal back then. He was eventually presented with one 26 years later by the club in May 2008 (Note: On the May 13, 2008 article, it said Hood never played enough league games to win a medal. On his Hall of Fame profile, it said Hood and teammate Davie Rae had both played 14 times. Rae had started more games than Hood so Rae was awarded the last medal back then.) Hood played 187 games with the club in two spells, scoring 83 goals. Hood was voted as Clyde's all-time cult hero in a Football Focus poll in 2004.

== Honours ==
Clyde

- Scottish Second Division: 1977–78, 1981–82

Individual

- QOSFC Supporters' Player of the Year: 1971–72
- Clyde FC Hall of Fame: Inducted, 2012
