= John McHugh (footballer, born 1943) =

Scottish footballer

Personal information
- Full name: John McHugh
- Date of birth: 6 July 1943
- Place of birth: Scotland
- Date of death: 31 August 2026 (aged 83)
- Position: Wing half

Youth career
- Dennistoun Waverley

Senior career*
Years	Team	Apps	(Gls)
1961–1975	Clyde	358	(15)
1975–1977	Forfar Athletic	64	(1)
Total		422	(16)
- * Club domestic league appearances and goals

John McHugh (6 July 1943 - 31st August 2026) was a Scottish former footballer.

McHugh began his senior career with Clyde in 1961. He went on to become a stalwart of the team, making 450 competitive appearances for the Glasgow club in 14 years, scoring 19 goals.

McHugh left Clyde in 1975, and joined Forfar Athletic, where he stayed for two years, making 77 appearances and scoring 1 goal. He retired in 1977, having clocked up 527 senior career appearances and 20 goals.

While at Clyde, McHugh was called up to the Scotland national team at least three times, but was never capped. He was called into the squad for friendlies against Netherlands, Portugal and Brazil in 1966. He did represent Glasgow against Leeds United in the Glasgow Charity Cup Final at Hampden in 1966.

McHugh was inducted into the Clyde FC Hall of Fame in 2014 as part of the legendary 1966-67 squad that finished third in Division One and also reached the Scottish Cup semi-finals. He was inducted again in 2019 on his own merit. McHugh died on 31st August 2026.
