= Eddie Anderson (footballer) =

Scottish footballer (born 1949)

Personal information
- Full name: Edward Anderson
- Date of birth: 26 June 1949 (age 77)
- Place of birth: Glasgow, Scotland
- Height: 5 ft 10 in (1.78 m)
- Position: Defender

Youth career
- Kirkintilloch Rob Roy

Senior career*
| Years | Team | Apps | (Gls) |
| 1969–1980 | Clyde | 296 | (5) |
- * Club domestic league appearances and goals

Edward Anderson (born 26 June 1949), is a Scottish former football defender.

== Career ==
Anderson joined Clyde in 1969, signing from junior side Kirkintilloch Rob Roy. He spent his entire senior career with the Bully Wee, making over 350 appearances in all competitions during his 11-year spell at Shawfield Stadium.

== Honours ==
Rob Roy

- Scottish Junior Cup: Runner-up 1968–69

Clyde

- Scottish Division Two: 1972–73
- Scottish Second Division: 1977–78
