= Rex Kingsley Footballer of the Year =

Rex Kingsley Football of the Year
- Awarded for: Best player in Scottish football
- Country: (Scotland)
- First award: 1951

The Rex Kingsley Footballer of the Year was an award given annually to the Scottish footballer who was adjudged to have been the best of that year (calendar year and not season) in Scottish football between 1951–1964. The award was handed out by Rex Kingsley of the Sunday Mail. As there were no Football Writers' awards (until the SFWA awards in 1965) or Players' Association awards (until the PFA Scotland awards in 1978), the Rex Kingsley Footballer of the Year award was generally considered to be the most prestigious of its type at the time.

== List of winners ==
Year	Player	Club	Ref
1951	(Scotland) Gordon Smith	Hibernian	
1952	(Scotland) Willie Thornton	Rangers	
1953	(Scotland) Bobby Evans	Celtic	
1954	(Scotland) Jimmy McGowan	Partick Thistle	
1955	(Scotland) George Young	Rangers	
1956	(Scotland) Willie McNaught	Raith Rovers	
1957	(Scotland) Alex Parker	Falkirk	
1958	(Scotland) Dave MacKay	Heart of Midlothian	
1959	(Scotland) Harry Haddock	Clyde	
1960	(Scotland) Willie Toner	Kilmarnock	
1961	(Scotland) John Cumming	Heart of Midlothian	
1962	(Scotland) Ian Ure	Dundee	
1963	(Scotland) Ian McMillan	Rangers	
1964	(Scotland) Charlie Aitken	Motherwell	

== Winners by club ==
Club	No. of wins	Winning years
Rangers	3	1952, 1955, 1963
Heart of Midlothian	2	1958, 1961
Celtic	1	1953
Clyde	1	1959
Dundee	1	1962
Falkirk	1	1957
Hibernian	1	1951
Kilmarnock	1	1960
Motherwell	1	1964
Partick Thistle	1	1954
Raith Rovers	1	1956
