= Tommy McCulloch (footballer, born 1934) =

Scottish footballer

Personal information
- Date of birth: 1 March 1934
- Place of birth: Glasgow, Scotland
- Date of death: 10 December 2016 (aged 82)
- Position: Goalkeeper

Senior career*
Years	Team	Apps	(Gls)
1956–1957	Bridgeton Waverley		
1957	→ Dumbarton (loan)	1	(0)
1957–1972	Clyde	378	(0)
1972–1973	Hamilton Academical	12	(0)
Total		391	(0)
- * Club domestic league appearances and goals

Thomas McCulloch (1 March 1934 – 10 December 2016) was a Scottish football goalkeeper.

McCulloch joined Clyde from local junior side Bridgeton Waverley in 1957. He won the Scottish Cup in 1958, his first season with the club and in senior football, keeping a clean sheet in the final against Hibernian. McCulloch was one of Clyde's greatest servants, and spent 15 years with the club, making 475 appearances in all competitions. He left Clyde in 1972 and joined Hamilton Academical for a year before retiring.

He played a total of 491 games in his 16-year career. He regularly attended Clyde functions, and was presented with a bottle of whisky in the 2007–08 Clyde player of the year event, to commemorate the 50th anniversary of the 1958 Scottish Cup win. He was inducted into the inaugural Clyde FC Hall of Fame in 2011. His death was announced on 10 December 2016.

== Honours ==
Clyde

- Scottish Cup: 1957–58
- Scottish Division Two: 1961–62
  - Promotion: 1963–64
- Glasgow Cup: 1958–59
  - Runner up: 1963–64, 1967–68, 1970–71
- Glasgow Charity Cup: 1957–58, 1960–61 (shared);
  - Runner up: 1958–59
