= Paul Stewart (footballer, born 1979) =

Scottish footballer

Personal information
- Full name: Paul Francis Stewart
- Date of birth: 1 August 1979 (age 47)
- Place of birth: Glasgow, Scotland
- Position: Midfielder

Senior career*
Years	Team	Apps	(Gls)
1997–1999	Clyde	1	(0)
1999–2000	Queen of the South	20	(0)
2000–2002	Stranraer	3	(0)
2006–2007	East Stirlingshire	29	(4)
2007–2009	East Fife	64	(4)
2009	Clyde	15	(0)
2010–2011	Queen's Park	10	(2)
- * Club domestic league appearances and goals

Paul Francis Stewart (born 1 August 1979) is a Scottish former professional footballer who played as a midfielder.
