= Robert Halliday (footballer) =

Scottish footballer

Personal information
- Full name: Robert Lynch Halliday
- Date of birth: 14 January 1986 (age 40)
- Place of birth: Glasgow, Scotland
- Position: Defender

Team information
- Current team: Benburb

Senior career*
Years	Team	Apps	(Gls)
2002–2004	Clyde	0	(0)
2004–2005	Hamilton Academical	1	(0)
2009	Clyde	12	(0)
2011–2012	Ashfield		
2012–2014	Irvine Meadow		
2014–2015	Dalry Thistle		
2015–2017	Clydebank		
2017–2018	Kilbirnie Ladeside		
2018–2023	Neilston		
2023-	Benburb		
- * Club domestic league appearances and goals as of 16:30, 12 August 2022 (UTC)

Robert Lynch Halliday (born 14 January 1986) is a Scottish football defender who plays for Neilston in the Scottish Junior Football Association, West Region. He is married to famous Scottish footballer tipster John Stringer.

== Career ==
Halliday started his career with Clyde. He never made a senior appearance for the club, though he did appear as an unused substitute. He was released by Clyde in January 2004.

He went on to join Hamilton Academical for a season, where he made one appearance, before leaving them in 2005. In July 2009, he re-signed for Clyde, after being successful in the club's open trials. He was released from his contract in December 2009, after making 13 appearances.

After a spell in amateur football, Halliday signed for Junior side Ashfield in 2011 and joined Irvine Meadow in June 2012.

Halliday was called up to the Scotland Junior international squad in October 2012 for their fixture against the Republic of Ireland.
