= 1876–77 in Scottish football =

Football in Scotland
- Season: 1876–77

1876–77 in Scottish football

Scottish Cup winners
- Vale of Leven

Teams in the FA Cup
- Queen's Park

The 1876–77 season was the fourth season of competitive domestic football in Scotland.

== Overview ==
The Scottish Cup was contested for the fourth time with Vale of Leven winning the cup for the first time. On the international front, Scotland played two away matches including their first in Wales.

In addition, Queen's Park competed in the FA Cup and the Glasgow Merchants Charity Cup was played for the first time.

== Scottish Cup ==
The increasing popularity of the competition saw 81 clubs entering the tournament's fourth edition. Vale of Leven progress to the latter stages was comfortable, eliminating Helensburgh, Vale of Leven Rovers, 3rd Lanark RV and Busby without conceding a goal. They also became the first team to beat Queen's Park in a competitive fixture in the quarter-final before beating Ayr Thistle in the semi-final. Rangers received two byes through the course of the competition, including in the semi-finals. They conceded just one goal on their road to the final, defeating Queen's Park Juniors, Towerhill, Mauchline and Lennox.

There were two notable firsts for the final – the absence of Queen's Park, and the need for a second replay. As with the previous season, the first match was staged at Hamilton Crescent and finished in a 1–1 draw. Three weeks later, the same result was recorded at the same venue before Robert Paton scored an 88th-minute winner as Vale of Leven recorded a 3–2 win at Hampden Park.

== County honours ==
Competition	Winner	Score	Runner-up
Edinburgh FA Cup	Thistle	w/o	3rd Edinburgh Rifle Volunteers

== Other honours ==
Competition	Winner	Score	Runner-up
Glasgow Charity Cup	Queen's Park	4–0	Rangers

== Teams in F.A. Cup ==
Queen's Park received byes to the third round but then withdrew before playing Oxford University.

Season	Club	Round	Score	Result
1876–77	Queen's Park	1st round	Received a bye	
1876–77	Queen's Park	2nd round	Received a bye	
1876–77	Queen's Park	3rd round	(England) Oxford University	Withdrew

== Scotland national team ==
Date	Venue	Opponents	Score	Competition	Scotland scorer(s)
3 March	Kennington Oval, London	England	3–1	Friendly	John Ferguson (2), James Richmond
5 March	Racecourse Ground, Wrexham	Wales	2–0	Friendly	Charles Campbell, (o.g.)
