= William Sharp (footballer) =

Scottish footballer

Personal information
- Full name: William McAdam Sharp
- Date of birth: 1889
- Place of birth: Paisley, Scotland
- Date of death: 8 July 1915 (aged 26)
- Place of death: Pas-de-Calais, France
- Position: Inside left

Senior career*
Years	Team	Apps	(Gls)
–1910	Kilbirnie Ladeside		
1910–1911	Clyde	5	(0)
1912–1914	St Mirren		
1914	Johnstone	1	(0)
- * Club domestic league appearances and goals

William McAdam Sharp (1889 – 8 July 1915) was a Scottish professional footballer who played in the Scottish League for Clyde and Johnstone as an inside left.

== Personal life ==
Prior to the First World War, Sharp was employed as a book-keeper with Harvey's in Saucel, Glasgow. In October 1914, two months after Britain's entry into the First World War, Sharp enlisted as a guardsman in the Scots Guards. He was serving in the 1st Battalion when he was killed in France on 8 July 1915. He was buried in Dud Corner Cemetery, near Loos.
