= Anglo-Franco-Scottish Friendship Cup =

- Organiser(s): The Football League; Scottish FA; French Football Federation
- Founded: 1960
- Abolished: 1962
- Region: Great Britain and France
- Teams: 8
- Most championships: Football League (2 wins)

The Anglo–Franco–Scottish Friendship Cup (French: Coupe anglo-franco-écossaise) was a short-lived inter-league football competition organised by the French Football Federation that would see teams from the Football League and the Scottish Football League compete against teams from the French Ligue de Football Professionnel.

== Format ==
The original idea was to have four teams from Scotland and four teams from England competing together as one nation, against eight teams from France. Due to the objection by the Scottish League this ruling was cancelled.

Two separate trophies were cast — one for Scottish clubs competing against French clubs and one for English clubs competing against French clubs. Individual clubs could not win the competition, so each country was awarded 2 points for a win and 1 point for a draw.

Entry to the competition was based on a club's final league position at the end of the season. However, with some clubs guaranteed entry to European football competitions such the European Cup and Inter Cities Fairs Cup, it would open up the chance for other clubs to participate who finished lower down their domestic league.

== History ==
In the inaugural Franco-Scottish competition, Sedan, Toulouse, Lens and Valenciennes were all given entry from the French League to participate in the Franco-Scottish competition. Clyde, Motherwell, Celtic and Dundee were all given entry from the Scottish League. Originally, Ayr United were to have competed, but they had to withdraw because of a lack of adequate floodlighting at their stadium. Their place was taken by Hibernian, who also withdrew because a friendly between an Edinburgh select and Chelsea was scheduled for the same date as their tie with Sedan. Hibernian were therefore replaced by Celtic; the away game in Sedan was the first time that the team wore shirt numbers, but they used yellow numbers on their green and white hoops, which made the numbers hard to read. Celtic continued to only display squad numbers on their shorts until the 1990s.

In the inaugural Anglo-French competition, the participating teams were Racing Club de Paris, Nantes, Le Havre and Lille from the French League, and Newcastle United, Liverpool, Bolton Wanderers and Middlesbrough from the Football League.

For the second season of the competition, Le Havre, Rouen, Nimes and Reims were elected to compete on behalf of France in the Franco-Scottish competition, while Bordeaux, Nancy, Lens and Béziers took part in the Anglo-French competition. Three English clubs took part in the 1961-62 competition - Southampton, Blackburn Rovers and Derby County - alongside one Welsh club, Cardiff City. With Celtic and Motherwell set to compete again, Aberdeen and Third Lanark replaced Clyde and Dundee in the Franco-Scottish competition.

Due to disagreements as to when matches should be played, neither of the matches between Celtic and Reims took place.

== 1960-61 ==
=== France v Scotland ===
1st Leg				2nd Leg				Overall	
Date	Home team	Result	Away team	Date	Home team	Result	Away team	Winner	Aggregate
6 August 1960	Sedan	3–0	Celtic	18 October 1960	Celtic	3–3	Sedan	(France) Sedan	6–3
7 August 1960	Toulouse	1–2	Motherwell	19 October 1960	Motherwell	4–1	Toulouse	(Scotland) Motherwell	6–2
7 August 1960	Lens	0–4	Clyde	27 September 1960	Clyde	2–1	Lens	(Scotland) Clyde	6–1
7 August 1960	Valenciennes	1–0	Dundee	7 December 1960	Dundee	4–2	Valenciemnes	(Scotland) Dundee	4–3

The Valenciennes-Dundee tie played on 7 August 1960 took place at Mers-les-Bains in the Somme department.

Scotland won the inaugural edition of the Franco-Scottish trophy by winning the series, 3 aggregate victories to 1.

=== France v England ===
1st Leg				2nd Leg				Overall	
Date	Home team	Result	Away team	Date	Home team	Result	Away team	Winner	Aggregate
10 August 1960	Racing Club de Paris	2–3	Newcastle United	28 September 1960	Newcastle United	2–1	Racing Club de Paris	(England) Newcastle United	5–3
11 August 1960	Nantes	0–2	Liverpool	30 November 1960	Liverpool	5–1	Nantes	(England) Liverpool	7–1
14 August 1960	Le Havre	1–1	Bolton Wanderers	15 March 1961	Bolton Wanderers	4–0	Le Havre	(England) Bolton Wanderers	5–1
14 August 1960	Lille	1–2	Middlesbrough	12 October 1960	Middlesbrough	4–1	Lille	(England) Middlesbrough	6–2

England won the inaugural edition of the Anglo-French trophy by winning the series, 4 aggregate victories to 0.

== 1961-62 ==
=== France v Scotland ===
1st Leg				2nd Leg				Overall	
Date	Home team	Result	Away team	Date	Home team	Result	Away team	Winner	Aggregate
10 October 1961	Aberdeen	2–0	Le Havre	6 May 1962	Le Havre	2–5	Aberdeen	(Scotland) Aberdeen	7–2
7 November 1961	Third Lanark	0–4	Rouen	9 May 1962	Rouen	2–1	Third Lanark	(France) Rouen	6–1
4 April 1962	Motherwell	1–2	Nîmes	9 May 1962	Nîmes	3–3	Motherwell	(France) Nîmes	5–4

France won the last edition of the Franco-Scottish trophy by winning the series, 2 aggregate victories to 1.

=== France v England ===
1st Leg				2nd Leg				Overall	
Date	Home team	Result	Away team	Date	Home team	Result	Away team	Winner	Aggregate
13 November 1961	Southampton	2–1	Bordeaux	1 May 1962	Bordeaux	2–0	Southampton	(France) Bordeaux	3–2
4 December 1961	Blackburn Rovers	3–1	Nancy	1 May 1962	Nancy	1–0	Blackburn Rovers	(England) Blackburn Rovers	3–2
13 December 1961	Lens	2–4	Cardiff City	7 March 1962	Cardiff City	2–0	Lens	(Wales) Cardiff City	6–2
11 April 1962	Derby County	1–0	Béziers	12 May 1962	Béziers	2–1	Derby County	Tie	2–2

Cardiff City are based in Wales but played in the Football League; there was no top-level Welsh league at the time. The Football League clubs won the second edition of the Anglo-French trophy by 2 to 1.
