= 1958 FIFA World Cup qualification – UEFA Group 9 =

Football tournament

The three teams in this group played against each other on a home-and-away basis. The group winner Scotland qualified for the sixth FIFA World Cup held in Sweden.

== Table ==
Pos	Team	Pld	W	D	L	GF	GA	GR	Pts	Qualification	Scotland national football team	Spain national football team	Switzerland national football team
1	Scotland	4	3	0	1	10	9	1.111	6	Qualification to 1958 FIFA World Cup	—	4–2	3–2
2	Spain	4	2	1	1	12	8	1.500	5		4–1	—	2–2
3	Switzerland	4	0	1	3	6	11	0.545	1		1–2	1–4	—

Source: FIFA

== Matches ==
10 March 1957

Spain	2 – 2	Switzerland
Suárez 30'; González 48'	Report	Hügi 6', 67'

Attendance: 120,000
Referee: Erich (West Germany)

8 May 1957

Scotland	4 – 2	Spain
Mudie 22', 70', 79'; Hewie 41' (pen.)	Report	Kubala 28'; Suárez 50'

Attendance: 88,890
Referee: Dusch (West Germany)

19 May 1957

Switzerland	1 – 2	Scotland
R. Vonlanthen 13'	Report	Mudie 33'; Collins 71'

Attendance: 48,000
Referee: Seipelt (Austria)

26 May 1957

Spain	4 – 1	Scotland
Mateos 11'; Kubala 33'; Basora 60', 87'	Report	Smith 79'

Attendance: 90,000
Referee: Leafe (England)

6 November 1957

Scotland	3 – 2	Switzerland
Robertson 29'; Mudie 52'; Scott 70'	Report	Riva 35'; Vonlanden 79'

Attendance: 58,811
Referee: Leafe (England)

24 November 1957

Switzerland	1 – 4	Spain
Ballaman 61'	Report	Kubala 19', 72'; Di Stéfano 24', 55'

Attendance: 43,000
Referee: Alsteen (Belgium)
