= 1956–57 in Scottish football =

Division One champions
- Rangers

Division Two champions
- Clyde

Scottish Cup winners
- Falkirk

League Cup winners
- Celtic

Junior Cup winners
- Banks O' Dee

Teams in Europe
- Rangers

Scotland national team
- 1957 BHC, 1958 World Cup qualification

The 1956–57 season was the 84th season of competitive football in Scotland and the 60th season of the Scottish Football League.

== Scottish League Division One ==
Pos	Team	Pld	W	D	L	GF	GA	GR	Pts
1	Rangers	34	26	3	5	96	48	2.000	55
2	Heart of Midlothian	34	24	5	5	81	48	1.688	53
3	Kilmarnock	34	16	10	8	57	39	1.462	42
4	Raith Rovers	34	16	7	11	84	58	1.448	39
5	Celtic	34	15	8	11	58	43	1.349	38
6	Aberdeen	34	18	2	14	79	59	1.339	38
7	Motherwell	34	16	5	13	72	66	1.091	37
8	Partick Thistle	34	13	8	13	53	51	1.039	34
9	Hibernian	34	12	9	13	69	56	1.232	33
10	Dundee	34	13	6	15	55	61	0.902	32
11	Airdrieonians	34	13	4	17	77	89	0.865	30
12	St Mirren	34	12	6	16	58	72	0.806	30
13	Queen's Park	34	11	7	16	55	59	0.932	29
14	Falkirk	34	10	8	16	51	70	0.729	28
15	East Fife	34	10	6	18	59	82	0.720	26
16	Queen of the South	34	10	5	19	54	96	0.563	25
17	Dunfermline Athletic	34	9	6	19	54	74	0.730	24
18	Ayr United	34	7	5	22	48	89	0.539	19

Source: RSSSF

Champions: Rangers
Relegated: Dunfermline Athletic, Ayr United

== Scottish League Division Two ==
Pos	Team	Pld	W	D	L	GF	GA	GD	Pts	Promotion or relegation
1	Clyde	36	29	6	1	122	39	+83	64	Promotion to the 1957–58 First Division
2	Third Lanark	36	24	3	9	105	51	+54	51	Promotion to the 1957–58 First Division
3	Cowdenbeath	36	20	5	11	87	65	+22	45	
4	Morton	36	18	7	11	81	70	+11	43	
5	Albion Rovers	36	18	6	12	98	80	+18	42	
6	Brechin City	36	15	10	11	72	68	+4	40	
7	Stranraer	36	15	10	11	79	77	+2	40	
8	Stirling Albion	36	17	5	14	81	64	+17	39	
9	Dumbarton	36	17	4	15	101	70	+31	38	
10	Arbroath	36	17	4	15	79	57	+22	38	
11	Hamilton Academical	36	14	8	14	69	68	+1	36	
12	St Johnstone	36	14	6	16	79	80	−1	34	
13	Dundee United	36	14	6	16	75	80	−5	34	
14	Stenhousemuir	36	13	6	17	71	81	−10	32	
15	Alloa Athletic	36	11	5	20	66	99	−33	27	
16	Forfar Athletic	36	9	5	22	75	100	−25	23	
17	Montrose	36	7	7	22	54	124	−70	21	
18	Berwick Rangers	36	7	6	23	58	114	−56	20	
19	East Stirlingshire	36	5	7	24	56	121	−65	17	

Source: "1956-1957 Second Division - SPFL Archive". SPFL.

Promoted: Clyde, Third Lanark

== Cup honours ==
Competition	Winner	Score	Runner-up
Scottish Cup 1956–57	Falkirk	2 – 1 (rep.)	Kilmarnock
League Cup 1956–57	Celtic	3 – 0 (rep.)	Partick Thistle
Junior Cup	Banks o' Dee	1 – 0	Kilsyth Rangers

== Other Honours ==
=== National ===
Competition	Winner	Score	Runner-up
Scottish Qualifying Cup - North	Fraserburgh	6 – 1 *	Inverness Caledonian
Scottish Qualifying Cup - South	Vale of Leithen	7 – 3 *	Peebles Rovers

=== County ===
Competition	Winner	Score	Runner-up
Aberdeenshire Cup	Buckie Thistle		
Ayrshire Cup	Kilmarnock	1 – 0	Ayr United
East of Scotland Shield	Hibernian	2 – 1	Hearts
Fife Cup	Raith Rovers	4 – 1	Dunfermline Athletic
Glasgow Cup	Rangers	2 – 0	Clyde
Lanarkshire Cup	Motherwell	6 – 2	Airdrie
Renfrewshire Cup	Morton	5 – 2	Babcock & Wilcox
Stirlingshire Cup	Dumbarton	5 – 3 *	Alloa Athletic

^{*} - aggregate over two legs

=== Highland League ===
Top Three
Pos	Team	Pld	W	D	L	GF	GA	GD	Pts
1	Buckie Thistle	28	20	5	3	78	52	+26	45
2	Inverness Caledonian	28	18	5	5	106	58	+48	41
3	Elgin City	28	16	5	7	75	48	+27	37

== Scotland national team ==
Date	Venue	Opponents	Score	Competition	Scotland scorer(s)
20 October 1956	Ninian Park, Cardiff (A)	Wales	2–2	BHC	Willie Fernie, Lawrie Reilly
7 November 1956	Hampden Park, Glasgow (H)	Northern Ireland	1–0	BHC	Alex Scott
21 November 1956	Hampden Park, Glasgow (H)	Yugoslavia	2–0	Friendly	Jackie Mudie, Sammy Baird
6 April 1957	Wembley Stadium, London (A)	England	1–2	BHC	Tommy Ring
8 May 1957	Hampden Park, Glasgow (H)	Spain	4–2	WCQG9	Jackie Mudie (3), John Hewie
19 May 1957	St. Jakob Stadium, Basel (A)	Switzerland	2–1	WCQG9	Jackie Mudie, Bobby Collins
22 May 1957	Neckarstadion, Stuttgart (A)	West Germany	3–1	Friendly	Bobby Collins(2), Jackie Mudie
26 May 1957	Bernabeu Stadium, Madrid (A)	Spain	1–4	WCQG9	Gordon Smith

Key:

- (H) = Home match
- (A) = Away match
- WCQG9 = World Cup qualifying - Group 9
- BHC = British Home Championship
