= Steven Powell =

Professional sports executive

Steven Powell is a professional sports executive. He has been the Executive Vice President and Chief Revenue Officer for the Houston Dynamo of Major League Soccer since 2011. Powell played an integral leadership role in the development and successful opening of the new BBVA Compass Stadium in 2012, overseeing and participating in all revenue generating areas of the business, including a sell out of all suites, premium seats and key stadium sponsorships, including the naming rights. He previously served as Senior Vice President of Sales and Marketing at the Dynamo after joining them in 2006 from the New York New Jersey Metrostars Powell is noted for being the creator of the highly successful community ticketing initiative entitled, Kicks4Kids” which he initially launched while serving as VP of Sales for the Tampa Bay Mutiny of Major League Soccer in 1996. Kicks4Kids has been utilized by teams across Major League Soccer and the UK, and is credited with rewarding over 500,000 disadvantaged children with game tickets, purchased by area companies interested in recognizing and encouraging behavioral and educational excellence in their communities. Powell began his career in sports in 1993 with the Wichita Wings Powell's career also includes time as Commercial Director of Hibernian Football Club of the Scottish Premier League and COO/CMO of the World Indoor Soccer League where he reported to former Queens Park Rangers, Millwall FC, Tampa Bay Rowdies (NASL) and Dallas Sidekicks (MISL) Coach/President Gordon Jago.
