= 1951–52 British Home Championship =

Football championship

Tournament details
- Host country: England, Ireland, Scotland and Wales
- Dates: 6 October 1951 – 5 April 1952
- Teams: 4

Final positions
- Champions: England; Wales (shared)

Tournament statistics
- Matches played: 6
- Goals scored: 13 (2.17 per match)
- Top scorer(s): (England) Nat Lofthouse (Scotland) Bobby Johnstone (England) Stan Pearson (Wales) Ivor Allchurch

The 1951–52 British Home Championship was an international football tournament played between the British Home Nations during the 1951–52 season. In an unusual conclusion, Wales shared the championship with England, one of only four tournaments Wales would share victory in post-war. Ireland by contrast endured one of their worst championships of the period, losing all three games and failing to score. Scotland too underperformed, although their two losses were both hard-fought.

Scotland had kicked off the competition with an easy victory over Ireland in the first match. England and Wales by contrast split the points, failing to breach a 1–1 draw at Ninian Park. England exerted their authority over the Irish in their second game with a simple win, whilst Wales performed the impressive feat of beating Scotland on their home turf with a hard-won 1–0 success. The final games were tensely contested, as Wales, hoping for an England failure at Hampden Park in their final game took the play to the Irish and ran out 3–0 winners. In Glasgow between England and Scotland, the tournament was decided by two Stan Pearson goals which gave England the victory and their half of the trophy. Had goal difference been used at this time to further separate the teams, then Wales would have won a rare individual victory, but this method of scoring was not introduced to the British Home Championship until the Seventies.

== Table ==
Team	Pld	W	D	L	GF	GA	GD	Pts
Wales (C)	3	2	1	0	5	1	+4	5
England (C)	3	2	1	0	5	2	+3	5
Scotland	3	1	0	2	4	3	+1	2
Ireland	3	0	0	3	0	8	−8	0

Rules for classification: 1) points. The points system worked as follows: 2 points for a win and 1 point for a draw.
(C) Co-champions

== Results ==
6 October 1951

Ireland	0 – 3	Scotland
		33' Tommy Orr; 44', 63' Bobby Johnstone

Windsor Park, Belfast
Attendance: 56,946
Referee: William H. Evans (England)

20 October 1951

Wales	1 – 1	England
Billy Foulkes		Eddie Baily

Ninian Park, Cardiff

14 November 1951

Scotland	0 – 1	Wales
		89' Ivor Allchurch

Hampden Park, Glasgow
Attendance: 71,272
Referee: Patrick Morris (Northern Ireland)

14 November 1951

England	2 – 0	Ireland
Nat Lofthouse 2

Villa Park, Birmingham

19 March 1952

Wales	3 – 0	Ireland
Walley Barnes; Ivor Allchurch; Roy Clarke

Vetch Field, Swansea

5 April 1952

Scotland	1 – 2	England
Lawrie Reilly 76'		10', 44' Stan Pearson

Hampden Park, Glasgow
Attendance: 134,504
Referee: Patrick Morris (Northern Ireland)
