= Lawrie Reilly =

Scottish footballer (1928–2013)

Personal information
- Full name: Lawrance Reilly
- Date of birth: 28 October 1928
- Place of birth: Edinburgh, Scotland
- Date of death: 22 July 2013 (aged 84)
- Place of death: Edinburgh, Scotland
- Height: 5 ft 7 in (1.70 m)
- Position: Forward

Senior career*
Years	Team	Apps	(Gls)
1946–1958	Hibernian	253	(185)

International career
1948–1957	Scotland	38	(22)
1948–1956	Scottish Football League XI	14	(14)
- * Club domestic league appearances and goals

Lawrance Reilly (28 October 1928 – 22 July 2013) was a Scottish footballer. He was one of the "Famous Five", the Hibernian forward line during the late 1940s and early 1950s, along with Bobby Johnstone, Gordon Smith, Eddie Turnbull, and Willie Ormond. Reilly is rated amongst the top forwards in Scottish football history and was inducted into the Scottish Football Hall of Fame in 2005.

== Life and career ==
Reilly joined Hibernian in 1946, despite interest from their city rivals Hearts. He quickly established himself in the Hibs team, scoring his first goal against Queen of the South. He netted the first of 18 hat-tricks for Hibs in 1947, also against Queen of the South. He made his league debut as a 17-year-old in the 1946–47 season. Reilly was a fringe player in the 1947–48 season as Hibs won the league championship, playing in insufficient games to earn a winners' medal. It was reported that Reilly and Johnny Aitkenhead might be loaned to Edinburgh derby rivals Hearts, who were battling against relegation that season.

Reilly became a first team regular during the following season, after Willie Ormond suffered a broken leg. He earned his first selection for Scotland that season, playing and scoring in a 3–1 win against England at Wembley. Later that year, the Famous Five were fielded together in a match for the first time. The forward line were used regularly for the first time during the 1949–50 season. The team earned 49 league points, more than in their championship-winning seasons, but lost out on the championship that season by a single point to Rangers. That season also provided a major disappointment in Reilly's international career, as Scotland qualified for the 1950 FIFA World Cup, but the SFA refused to send the team to Brazil because they had failed to win the 1950 British Home Championship.

By the early 1950s, Hibernian were the most feared force in Scottish football as they won back-to-back league championships in 1951 and 1952. Reilly was instrumental in both triumphs, finishing top scorer in the 1951–52 triumph. Hibs finished second to Rangers in 1953 and the club's fortunes started to go into decline, although Reilly continued to perform well. He missed out on selection for the 1954 FIFA World Cup due to suffering from a bout of pleurisy.

Reilly almost quit football after a row with Hibernian after manager Hugh Shaw refused him a testimonial match. Reilly submitted a transfer request that was accepted by the board of directors, but the matter was eventually resolved. During the dispute, which lasted four months, Reilly took a job outwith football to support his family. The SFA brokered a compromise that allowed Reilly to resume playing, while retaining his other income.

Reilly continued to score goals frequently after he returned to the Hibs side, and he featured in the side that participated in the first season of the European Cup. Injuries were beginning to make his appearances more intermittent, with a knee injury forcing his retirement from the game in 1958. He made his final Scotland appearance against England in 1957, but failed to score at Wembley for the first time. His last appearance for Hibs came in April 1958, when he scored in a 2–1 win against Rangers. Later that year he was finally given a testimonial match, but was prevented from playing in it due to SFA regulations.

Reilly won a total 38 caps for Scotland, scoring 22 goals. He is Hibernian's most capped player and is fourth in the list of goalscorers for the Scotland national team. He also boasts an international strike rate of 61%, greater than that of Kenny Dalglish, Denis Law and Joe Jordan, and second only to that of Hughie Gallacher amongst those capped more than 15 times. Late goals against Northern Ireland and England in the 1953 British Home Championship meant that Reilly earned the nickname of "Last-minute Reilly". Reilly also scored 14 goals in as many appearances for the Scottish Football League XI.

== Death and legacy ==
Reilly died in July 2013, aged 84. In August 2019, his two Scottish league championship medals were sold at auction for £12,000.

== Career statistics ==
Appearances and goals by national team and year
National team	Year	Apps	Goals
Scotland	1948	1	0
Scotland	1949	4	2
Scotland	1950	3	2
Scotland	1951	7	3
Scotland	1952	6	6
Scotland	1953	3	3
Scotland	1954	1	0
Scotland	1955	7	5
Scotland	1956	5	1
Scotland	1957	1	0
Total		38	22

Scores and results list Scotland's goal tally first, score column indicates score after each Reilly goal.

List of international goals scored by Lawrie Reilly
No.	Date	Venue	Opponent	Score	Result	Competition	Ref.
1	9 April 1949	Wembley Stadium, London	England	3–0	3–1	1948–49 British Home Championship	
2	1 October 1949	Windsor Park, Belfast, Northern Ireland	Ireland	4–0	8–2	1949–50 British Home Championship	
3	21 October 1950	Ninian Park, Cardiff, Wales	Wales	1–0	3–1	1950–51 British Home Championship	
4	21 October 1950	Ninian Park, Cardiff, Wales	Wales	2–0	3–1	1950–51 British Home Championship	
5	14 April 1951	Wembley Stadium, London	England	2–1	3–2	1950–51 British Home Championship	
6	12 May 1951	Hampden Park, Glasgow	Denmark	2–1	3–1	Friendly	
7	16 May 1951	Hampden Park, Glasgow	France	1–0	1–0	Friendly	
8	5 April 1952	Hampden Park, Glasgow	England	1–2	1–2	1951–52 British Home Championship	
9	30 April 1952	Hampden Park, Glasgow	United States	1–0	6–0	Friendly	
10	30 April 1952	Hampden Park, Glasgow	United States	2–0	6–0	Friendly	
11	30 April 1952	Hampden Park, Glasgow	United States	4–0	6–0	Friendly	
12	25 May 1952	Idrætsparken, Copenhagen	Denmark	2–1	2–1	Friendly	
13	5 November 1952	Hampden Park, Glasgow	Northern Ireland	1–1	1–1	1952–53 British Home Championship	
14	18 April 1953	Wembley Stadium, London	England	1–1	2–2	1952–53 British Home Championship	
15	18 April 1953	Wembley Stadium, London	England	2–2	2–2	1952–53 British Home Championship	
16	4 November 1953	Hampden Park, Glasgow	Wales	3–1	3–3	1953–54 British Home Championship	
17	2 April 1955	Wembley Stadium, London, England	England	1–2	2–7	1954–55 British Home Championship	
18	4 May 1955	Hampden Park, Glasgow, Scotland	Portugal	3–0	3–0	Friendly	
19	15 May 1955	JNA Stadium, Belgrade, Yugoslavia	Yugoslavia	1–1	2–2	Friendly	
20	19 May 1955	Prater Stadium, Vienna, Austria	Austria	4–1	4–1	Friendly	
21	8 October 1955	Windsor Park, Belfast, Northern Ireland	Northern Ireland	1–2	1–2	1955–56 British Home Championship	
22	20 October 1956	Ninian Park, Cardiff, Wales	Wales	2–2	2–2	1956–57 British Home Championship	

== Honours ==
- Scottish league champion: 1950–51, 1951–52

== See also ==
- List of one-club men in association football
- List of Scotland national football team hat-tricks
