= 1954–55 in Scottish football =

Sports season

Division A champions
- Aberdeen

Division B champions
- Airdrieonians

Division C (North & East) champions
- Aberdeen 'A'

Division C (South & West) champions
- Partick Thistle 'A'

Scottish Cup winners
- Clyde

League Cup winners
- Heart of Midlothian

Junior Cup winners
- Kilsyth Rangers

Scotland national team
- 1955 BHC

The 1954–55 season was the 82nd season of competitive football in Scotland and the 58th season of the Scottish Football League.

Aberdeen won their first League Title.

== Scottish League Division A ==
Pos	Team	Pld	W	D	L	GF	GA	GD	Pts	Qualification
1	Aberdeen (C)	30	24	1	5	73	26	+47	49	
2	Celtic	30	19	8	3	76	37	+39	46	
3	Rangers	30	19	3	8	67	33	+34	41	
4	Hearts	30	16	7	7	74	45	+29	39	
5	Hibernian	30	15	4	11	64	54	+10	34	Invitation for the European Cup first round
6	St Mirren	30	12	8	10	55	54	+1	32	
7	Clyde	30	11	9	10	59	50	+9	31	
8	Dundee	30	13	4	13	48	48	0	30	
9	Partick Thistle	30	11	7	12	49	61	−12	29	
10	Kilmarnock	30	10	6	14	46	58	−12	26	
11	East Fife	30	9	6	15	51	62	−11	24	
12	Falkirk	30	8	8	14	42	54	−12	24	
13	Queen of the South	30	9	6	15	38	56	−18	24	
14	Raith Rovers	30	10	3	17	49	57	−8	23	
15	Motherwell	30	9	4	17	42	62	−20	22	
16	Stirling Albion	30	2	2	26	29	105	−76	6	

Source: RSSSF
(C) Champions

Champions: Aberdeen
Note: There was no relegation this season with Division One being increased to 18 teams next season.

== Scottish League Division B ==
Pos	Team	Pld	W	D	L	GF	GA	GD	Pts	Promotion or relegation
1	Airdrieonians	30	18	10	2	103	61	+42	46	Promotion to the 1955–56 Division One
2	Dunfermline Athletic	30	19	4	7	72	40	+32	42	Promotion to the 1955–56 Division One
3	Hamilton Academical	30	17	5	8	74	51	+23	39	
4	Queen's Park	30	15	5	10	65	36	+29	35	
5	Third Lanark	30	13	7	10	63	49	+14	33	
6	Stenhousemuir	30	12	8	10	70	51	+19	32	
7	St Johnstone	30	15	2	13	60	51	+9	32	
8	Ayr United	30	14	4	12	61	73	−12	32	
9	Morton	30	12	5	13	58	69	−11	29	
10	Forfar Athletic	30	11	6	13	63	80	−17	28	
11	Albion Rovers	30	8	10	12	50	69	−19	26	
12	Arbroath	30	8	8	14	55	72	−17	24	
13	Dundee United	30	8	6	16	55	70	−15	22	
14	Cowdenbeath	30	8	5	17	55	72	−17	21	
15	Alloa Athletic	30	7	6	17	51	75	−24	20	
16	Brechin City	30	8	3	19	53	89	−36	19	

Source: "1954-1955 Division B - SPFL Archive". SPFL.

Promoted: Airdrieonians Dunfermline

== Scottish League Division C ==
Section	Winner	Runner-up
South-West	Partick Thistle 'A'	Rangers 'A'
North-East	Aberdeen 'A'	Hibernian 'A'

Division disbanded. Promoted: Montrose, East Stirlingshire, Berwick Rangers, Dumbarton, Stranraer. Reserve teams placed into a separate Scottish (Reserve) League.

== Cup honours ==
Competition	Winner	Score	Runner-up
Scottish Cup	Clyde	1 – 0 (rep.)	Celtic
League Cup	Heart of Midlothian	4–2	Motherwell
Junior Cup	Kilsyth Rangers	4 – 1 (rep.)	Duntocher Hibs

== Other Honours ==
=== County ===
Competition	Winner	Score	Runner-up
Aberdeenshire Cup	Buckie Thistle		
Ayrshire Cup	Kilmarnock	3 – 0	Ayr United
East of Scotland Shield	Hearts	4 – 3	Hibernian
Fife Cup	Dunfermline Athletic	1 – 1 †	Raith Rovers
Forfarshire Cup	Dundee	6 – 0	Montrose
Glasgow Cup	Partick Thistle	2 – 0	Rangers
Lanarkshire Cup	Motherwell	3 – 2	Airdrie
Stirlingshire Cup	Stirling Albion	8 – 1 *	Alloa Athletic

* - aggregate over two legs
† - trophy shared

=== Highland League ===
Top Three
Pos	Team	Pld	W	D	L	GF	GA	GD	Pts
1	Fraserburgh	25	18	2	5	91	55	+36	38 (Note: season not completed)
2	Clachnacuddin	26	18	2	6	70	31	+39	38
3	Buckie Thistle	25	18	1	6	96	34	+62	37

== Scotland national team ==
Date	Venue	Opponents	Score	Competition	Scotland scorer(s)
16 October 1954	Ninian Park, Cardiff (A)	Wales	1–0	BHC	Paddy Buckley
3 November 1954	Hampden Park, Glasgow (H)	Northern Ireland	2–2	BHC	Jimmy Davidson, Bobby Johnstone
8 December 1954	Hampden Park, Glasgow (H)	Hungary	2–4	Friendly	Tommy Ring, Bobby Johnstone
2 April 1955	Wembley Stadium, London (A)	England	2–7	BHC	Lawrie Reilly, Tommy Docherty
4 May 1955	Hampden Park, Glasgow (H)	Portugal	3–0	Friendly	Tommy Gemmell, Billy Liddell, Lawrie Reilly
15 May 1955	Red Star Stadium, Belgrade (A)	Yugoslavia	2–2	Friendly	Lawrie Reilly, Gordon Smith
19 May 1955	Prater Stadium, Vienna (A)	Austria	4–1	Friendly	Archie Robertson, Gordon Smith, Billy Liddell, Lawrie Reilly
29 May 1955	Népstadion, Budapest (A)	Hungary	1–3	Friendly	Gordon Smith

Key:

- (H) = Home match
- (A) = Away match
- BHC = British Home Championship
