= 1972–73 Scottish Division Two =

Scottish Second Division
- Season: 1972–73
- Champions: Clyde
- Promoted: Clyde; Dunfermline Athletic

The 1972–73 Scottish Second Division was won by Clyde who, along with second placed Dunfermline Athletic, were promoted to the First Division. Brechin City finished bottom.

== Table ==
Pos	Team	Pld	W	D	L	GF	GA	GD	Pts	Promotion or relegation
1	Clyde	36	23	10	3	68	28	+40	56	Promotion to the 1973–74 First Division
2	Dunfermline Athletic	36	23	6	7	95	32	+63	52	Promotion to the 1973–74 First Division
3	Stirling Albion	36	19	9	8	70	39	+31	47	
4	Raith Rovers	36	19	9	8	73	42	+31	47	
5	St Mirren	36	19	7	10	79	50	+29	45	
6	Montrose	36	18	8	10	82	58	+24	44	
7	Cowdenbeath	36	14	10	12	57	53	+4	38	
8	Hamilton Academical	36	16	6	14	67	63	+4	38	
9	Berwick Rangers	36	16	5	15	45	54	−9	37	
10	Stenhousemuir	36	14	8	14	44	41	+3	36	
11	Queen of the South	36	13	8	15	45	52	−7	34	
12	Alloa Athletic	36	11	11	14	45	49	−4	33	
13	East Stirlingshire	36	12	8	16	52	69	−17	32	
14	Queen's Park	36	9	12	15	44	61	−17	30	
15	Stranraer	36	13	4	19	56	78	−22	30	
16	Forfar Athletic	36	10	9	17	38	66	−28	29	
17	Clydebank	36	9	6	21	48	72	−24	24	
18	Albion Rovers	36	5	8	23	35	83	−48	18	
19	Brechin City	36	5	4	27	46	99	−53	14	

Source: "1972-1973 Second Division - SPFL Archive". SPFL (in Malay).
