= 1956–57 British Home Championship =

Tournament details
- Host country: England, Ireland, Scotland and Wales
- Dates: 6 October 1956 – 10 April 1957
- Teams: 4

Final positions
- Champions: England
- Runners-up: Scotland

Tournament statistics
- Matches played: 6
- Goals scored: 14 (2.33 per match)
- Top scorer: 14 players (1 each)

The 1956–57 British Home Championship was the final full championship before the Munich air disaster would kill or end the careers of five England Internationals one from Northern Ireland mid-way through the following tournament. A close-fought competition between England and Scotland, the tournament also featured some very good performances from Wales and Ireland. For tournaments of the day, this was considered a low-scoring affair, although the performances were consistently high.

England won the championship in a close final match, but after the first round all could have taken the trophy. Unusually it was England who were grateful for a point in Belfast after a dominant display from the Irish in a 1–1 draw with the Scots and Welsh also playing out an opening indecisive game. In the second games, Wales were well beaten by England, but Scotland were forced to struggle to a 1–0 win over Ireland. In the final matches, any team could still have taken the trophy, but Wales and Ireland outplayed each other in their match and as a result drew 0–0, leaving the final game to be the decider between the English and the Scots. England triumphed eventually in a tough 2–1 win.

== Table ==
Team	Pld	W	D	L	GF	GA	GD	Pts
England (C)	3	2	1	0	6	3	+3	5
Scotland	3	1	1	1	4	4	0	3
Ireland	3	0	2	1	1	2	−1	2
Wales	3	0	2	1	3	5	−2	2

Rules for classification: 1) points. The points system worked as follows: 2 points for a win and 1 point for a draw.
(C) Champions

== Results ==
6 October 1956

Ireland	1 – 1	England
Jimmy McIlroy		Stanley Matthews

Windsor Park, Belfast

20 October 1956

Wales	2 – 2	Scotland
Trevor Ford, Terry Medwin		Lawrie Reilly, Willie Fernie

Ninian Park, Cardiff

7 November 1956

Scotland	1 – 0	Ireland
Alex Scott

Hampden Park, Glasgow

14 November 1956

England	3 – 1	Wales
Johnny Haynes, Johnny Brooks, Tom Finney		John Charles

Wembley Stadium, London

6 April 1957

England	2 – 1	Scotland
Derek Kevan, Duncan Edwards		Tommy Ring

Wembley Stadium, London

10 April 1957

Ireland	0 – 0	Wales

Windsor Park, Belfast
