= 1958–59 in Scottish football =

Division One champions
- Rangers

Division Two champions
- Ayr United

Scottish Cup winners
- St Mirren

League Cup winners
- Heart of Midlothian

Junior Cup winners
- Irvine Meadow

Teams in Europe
- Heart of Midlothian

Scotland national team
- 1959 BHC

The 1958–59 season was the 86th season of competitive football in Scotland and the 62nd season of the Scottish Football League.

== Scottish League Division One ==
The last day of the season saw Rangers holding a two-point lead over Hearts, with the clubs having an identical goal average. Rangers lost 1–2 at home to Aberdeen, only for Hearts also to lose, 2–1 away to Celtic. Had Hearts won by any score they would have won the title.

| Pos | Team | Pld | W | D | L | GF | GA | GR | Pts |
|---|---|---|---|---|---|---|---|---|---|
| 1 | Rangers | 34 | 21 | 8 | 5 | 92 | 51 | 1.804 | 50 |
| 2 | Heart of Midlothian | 34 | 21 | 6 | 7 | 92 | 51 | 1.804 | 48 |
| 3 | Motherwell | 34 | 18 | 8 | 8 | 83 | 50 | 1.660 | 44 |
| 4 | Dundee | 34 | 16 | 9 | 9 | 61 | 51 | 1.196 | 41 |
| 5 | Airdrieonians | 34 | 15 | 7 | 12 | 64 | 62 | 1.032 | 37 |
| 6 | Celtic | 34 | 14 | 8 | 12 | 70 | 53 | 1.321 | 36 |
| 7 | St Mirren | 34 | 14 | 7 | 13 | 71 | 74 | 0.959 | 35 |
| 8 | Kilmarnock | 34 | 13 | 8 | 13 | 58 | 51 | 1.137 | 34 |
| 9 | Partick Thistle | 34 | 14 | 6 | 14 | 59 | 66 | 0.894 | 34 |
| 10 | Hibernian | 34 | 13 | 6 | 15 | 68 | 70 | 0.971 | 32 |
| 11 | Third Lanark | 34 | 11 | 10 | 13 | 74 | 83 | 0.892 | 32 |
| 12 | Stirling Albion | 34 | 11 | 8 | 15 | 54 | 64 | 0.844 | 30 |
| 13 | Aberdeen | 34 | 12 | 5 | 17 | 63 | 66 | 0.955 | 29 |
| 14 | Raith Rovers | 34 | 10 | 9 | 15 | 60 | 70 | 0.857 | 29 |
| 15 | Clyde | 34 | 12 | 4 | 18 | 62 | 66 | 0.939 | 28 |
| 16 | Dunfermline Athletic | 34 | 10 | 8 | 16 | 68 | 87 | 0.782 | 28 |
| 17 | Falkirk | 34 | 10 | 7 | 17 | 58 | 79 | 0.734 | 27 |
| 18 | Queen of the South | 34 | 6 | 6 | 22 | 38 | 101 | 0.376 | 18 |

Source: RSSSF

Champions: Rangers
Relegated: Falkirk, Queen of the South

== Scottish League Division Two ==
| Pos | Team | Pld | W | D | L | GF | GA | GD | Pts | Promotion or relegation |
|---|---|---|---|---|---|---|---|---|---|---|
| 1 | Ayr United | 36 | 28 | 4 | 4 | 115 | 48 | +67 | 60 | Promotion to the 1959–60 First Division |
| 2 | Arbroath | 36 | 23 | 5 | 8 | 86 | 59 | +27 | 51 | Promotion to the 1959–60 First Division |
| 3 | Stenhousemuir | 36 | 20 | 6 | 10 | 87 | 68 | +19 | 46 | |
| 4 | Dumbarton | 36 | 19 | 7 | 10 | 94 | 61 | +33 | 45 | |
| 5 | Brechin City | 36 | 16 | 10 | 10 | 79 | 65 | +14 | 42 | |
| 6 | St Johnstone | 36 | 15 | 10 | 11 | 54 | 44 | +10 | 40 | |
| 7 | Hamilton Academical | 36 | 15 | 8 | 13 | 76 | 62 | +14 | 38 | |
| 8 | East Fife | 36 | 15 | 8 | 13 | 83 | 81 | +2 | 38 | |
| 9 | Berwick Rangers | 36 | 16 | 6 | 14 | 63 | 66 | −3 | 38 | |
| 10 | Albion Rovers | 36 | 14 | 7 | 15 | 84 | 79 | +5 | 35 | |
| 11 | Morton | 36 | 13 | 8 | 15 | 68 | 85 | −17 | 34 | |
| 12 | Forfar Athletic | 36 | 12 | 9 | 15 | 73 | 87 | −14 | 33 | |
| 13 | Alloa Athletic | 36 | 12 | 7 | 17 | 76 | 81 | −5 | 31 | |
| 14 | Cowdenbeath | 36 | 13 | 5 | 18 | 67 | 79 | −12 | 31 | |
| 15 | East Stirlingshire | 36 | 10 | 8 | 18 | 50 | 79 | −29 | 28 | |
| 16 | Stranraer | 36 | 8 | 11 | 17 | 63 | 76 | −13 | 27 | |
| 17 | Dundee United | 36 | 9 | 7 | 20 | 62 | 86 | −24 | 25 | |
| 18 | Queen's Park | 36 | 9 | 6 | 21 | 53 | 80 | −27 | 24 | |
| 19 | Montrose | 36 | 6 | 6 | 24 | 49 | 96 | −47 | 18 | |

Source: "1958-1959 Second Division - SPFL Archive". SPFL.

Promoted: Ayr United, Arbroath

== Cup honours ==
| Competition | Winner | Score | Runner-up |
|---|---|---|---|
| Scottish Cup 1958–59 | St Mirren | 3 – 1 | Aberdeen |
| League Cup 1958–59 | Heart of Midlothian | 5 – 1 | Partick Thistle |
| Junior Cup | Irvine Meadow XI | 2 – 1 | Shettleston |

== Other honours ==
=== National ===
| Competition | Winner | Score | Runner-up |
|---|---|---|---|
| Scottish Qualifying Cup – North | Elgin City | 6 – 4 * | Rothes |
| Scottish Qualifying Cup – South | Eyemouth United | 6 – 1 * | Peebles Rovers |

=== County ===
| Competition | Winner | Score | Runner-up |
|---|---|---|---|
| Aberdeenshire Cup | Peterhead | | |
| Ayrshire Cup | Ayr United | 4 – 4 * ‡ | Kilmarnock |
| East of Scotland Shield | Hibernian | 2 – 0 | Hearts |
| Fife Cup | Dunfermline Athletic | 7 – 6 * | East Fife |
| Forfarshire Cup | Brechin City | 6 – 0 | Dundee United |
| Glasgow Cup | Clyde | 1 – 0 † | Rangers |
| Lanarkshire Cup | Motherwell | 4 – 2 | Airdrie |
| Renfrewshire Cup | St Mirren | 7 – 5 * | Morton |
| Stirlingshire Cup | Stirling Albion | 4 – 0 | Stenhousemuir |

^{*} – aggregate over two legs
† – replay
‡ – trophy shared

=== Highland League ===
Top Three
| Pos | Team | Pld | W | D | L | GF | GA | GD | Pts |
|---|---|---|---|---|---|---|---|---|---|
| 1 | Rothes | 28 | 18 | 5 | 5 | 87 | 49 | +38 | 41 |
| 2 | Fraserburgh | 28 | 18 | 5 | 5 | 93 | 41 | +52 | 41 |
| 3 | Elgin City | 28 | 15 | 6 | 7 | 85 | 49 | +36 | 36 |

== Scotland national team ==
| Date | Venue | Opponents | Score | Competition | Scotland scorer(s) |
|---|---|---|---|---|---|
| 18 November 1958 | Ninian Park, Cardiff (A) | Wales | 3–0 | BHC | Graham Leggat, Denis Law, Bobby Collins |
| 5 November 1958 | Hampden Park, Glasgow (H) | Northern Ireland | 2–2 | BHC | David Herd, Bobby Collins |
| 11 April 1959 | Wembley Stadium, London (A) | England | 0–1 | BHC | |
| 6 May 1959 | Hampden Park, Glasgow (H) | West Germany | 3–2 | Friendly | John White, Andy Weir, Graham Leggat |
| 27 May 1959 | Olympisch Stadion, Amsterdam (A) | Netherlands | 2–1 | Friendly | Bobby Collins, Graham Leggat |
| 3 June 1959 | Estadio da Luz, Lisbon (A) | Portugal | 0–1 | Friendly | |

Key:

- (H) = Home match
- (A) = Away match
- BHC = British Home Championship
