= 1957–58 in Scottish football =

Division One champions
- Heart of Midlothian

Division Two champions
- Stirling Albion

Scottish Cup winners
- Clyde

League Cup winners
- Celtic

Junior Cup winners
- Shotts Bon Accord

Teams in Europe
- Rangers

Scotland national team
- 1958 BHC, 1958 FIFA World Cup

The 1957–58 season was the 85th season of competitive football in Scotland and the 61st season of the Scottish Football League.

== Scottish League Division One ==
Pos	Team	Pld	W	D	L	GF	GA	GR	Pts
1	Heart of Midlothian	34	29	4	1	132	29	4.552	62
2	Rangers	34	22	5	7	89	49	1.816	49
3	Celtic	34	19	8	7	84	47	1.787	46
4	Clyde	34	18	6	10	84	61	1.377	42
5	Kilmarnock	34	14	9	11	60	55	1.091	37
6	Partick Thistle	34	17	3	14	69	71	0.972	37
7	Raith Rovers	34	14	7	13	66	56	1.179	35
8	Motherwell	34	12	8	14	68	67	1.015	32
9	Hibernian	34	13	5	16	59	60	0.983	31
10	Falkirk	34	11	9	14	64	82	0.780	31
11	Dundee	34	13	5	16	49	65	0.754	31
12	Aberdeen	34	14	2	18	68	76	0.895	30
13	St Mirren	34	11	8	15	59	66	0.894	30
14	Third Lanark	34	13	4	17	69	88	0.784	30
15	Queen of the South	34	12	5	17	61	72	0.847	29
16	Airdrieonians	34	13	2	19	71	92	0.772	28
17	East Fife	34	10	3	21	45	88	0.511	23
18	Queen's Park	34	4	1	29	41	114	0.360	9

Source: RSSSF

Champions: Hearts
Relegated: East Fife, Queen's Park

== Scottish League Division Two ==
Pos	Team	Pld	W	D	L	GF	GA	GD	Pts	Promotion or relegation
1	Stirling Albion	36	25	5	6	105	48	+57	55	Promotion to the 1958–59 First Division
2	Dunfermline Athletic	36	24	5	7	120	42	+78	53	Promotion to the 1958–59 First Division
3	Arbroath	36	21	5	10	89	72	+17	47	
4	Dumbarton	36	20	4	12	92	57	+35	44	
5	Ayr United	36	18	6	12	98	81	+17	42	
6	Cowdenbeath	36	17	8	11	100	85	+15	42	
7	Brechin City	36	16	8	12	80	81	−1	40	
8	Alloa Athletic	36	15	9	12	88	78	+10	39	
9	Dundee United	36	12	9	15	81	77	+4	33	
10	Hamilton Academical	36	12	9	15	70	79	−9	33	
11	St Johnstone	36	12	9	15	67	85	−18	33	
12	Forfar Athletic	36	13	6	17	70	71	−1	32	
13	Morton	36	12	8	16	77	83	−6	32	
14	Montrose	36	13	6	17	55	72	−17	32	
15	East Stirlingshire	36	12	5	19	55	79	−24	29	
16	Stenhousemuir	36	12	5	19	68	98	−30	29	
17	Albion Rovers	36	12	5	19	53	79	−26	29	
18	Stranraer	36	9	7	20	54	83	−29	25	
19	Berwick Rangers	36	5	5	26	37	109	−72	15	

Source: "1957-1958 Second Division - SPFL Archive". SPFL.

Promoted: Stirling Albion, Dunfermline Athletic

== Cup honours ==
Competition	Winner	Score	Runner-up
Scottish Cup 1957–58	Clyde	1 – 0	Hibernian
League Cup 1957–58	Celtic	7 – 1	Rangers
Junior Cup	Shotts Bon Accord	2 – 0	Pumpherston

== Other honours ==
=== National ===
Competition	Winner	Score	Runner-up
Scottish Qualifying Cup – North	Buckie Thistle	4 – 3 *	Fraserburgh
Scottish Qualifying Cup – South	Eyemouth United	10 – 3 *	Babcock & Wilcox

=== County ===
Competition	Winner	Score	Runner-up
Aberdeenshire Cup	Keith		
Ayrshire Cup	Ayr United	2 – 1 *	Kilmarnock
East of Scotland Shield	Hearts	3 – 0	Hibernian
Fife Cup	Dunfermline Athletic	6 – 3 *	Raith Rovers
Forfarshire Cup	Arbroath	3 – 2	Forfar Athletic
Glasgow Cup	Rangers	4 – 2 †	Third Lanark
Lanarkshire Cup	Motherwell	5 – 4	Airdrie
Renfrewshire Cup	Morton		
Stirlingshire Cup	Alloa Athletic	6 – 5 *	Stenhousemuir

^{*} – aggregate over two legs
† – replay

=== Highland League ===
Top Three
Pos	Team	Pld	W	D	L	GF	GA	GD	Pts
1	Buckie Thistle	28	22	2	4	102	23	+79	46
2	Elgin City	28	19	2	7	77	45	+32	40
3	Peterhead	28	14	5	9	57	52	+5	33

== Scotland national team ==
Scotland qualified for the 1958 FIFA World Cup by finishing top of their qualifying group, ahead of Spain and Switzerland. The team went out of the finals at the first round, after one draw and two defeats.

Date	Venue	Opponents	Score	Competition	Scotland scorer(s)
5 October	Windsor Park, Belfast (A)	Northern Ireland	1–1	BHC	Graham Leggat
6 November	Hampden Park, Glasgow (H)	Switzerland	3–2	WCQG9	Archie Robertson, Jackie Mudie, Alex Scott
13 November	Hampden Park, Glasgow (H)	Wales	1–1	BHC	Bobby Collins
19 April	Hampden Park, Glasgow (H)	England	0–4	BHC	
7 May	Hampden Park, Glasgow (H)	Hungary	1–1	Friendly	Jackie Mudie
1 June	Stadion Dziesieciolecia, Warsaw (A)	Poland	2–1	Friendly	Bobby Collins (2)
8 June	Arosvallen, Västerås (N)	Yugoslavia	1–1	WCG2	Jimmy Murray
11 June	Idrottsparken, Norrköping (N)	Paraguay	2–3	WCG2	Jackie Mudie, Bobby Collins
15 June	Eyravallen, Örebro (N)	France	1–2	WCG2	Sammy Baird

Key:

- (H) = Home match
- (A) = Away match
- (N) = Match played on Neutral ground
- WCQG9 = World Cup qualifying – Group 9
- WCG2 = World Cup – Group 2
- BHC = British Home Championship
