= 1977–78 Scottish Second Division =

Scottish Second Division
- Season: 1977–78
- Champions: Clyde
- Promoted: Clyde; Raith Rovers

The 1977–78 Scottish Second Division was won by Clyde who, along with second placed Raith Rovers, were promoted to the First Division. Brechin City finished bottom.

== Table ==
Pos	Team	Pld	W	D	L	GF	GA	GD	Pts	Promotion
1	Clyde (C, P)	39	21	11	7	71	32	+39	53	Promotion to the First Division
2	Raith Rovers (P)	39	19	15	5	63	34	+29	53	Promotion to the First Division
3	Dunfermline Ath	39	18	12	9	64	41	+23	48	
4	Berwick Rangers	39	16	16	7	68	51	+17	48	
5	Falkirk	39	15	14	10	51	46	+5	44	
6	Forfar Athletic	39	17	8	14	61	55	+6	42	
7	Queen's Park	39	13	15	11	52	51	+1	41	
8	Albion Rovers	39	16	8	15	68	68	0	40	
9	East Stirlingshire	39	15	8	16	55	65	−10	38	
10	Cowdenbeath	39	13	8	18	75	78	−3	34	
11	Stranraer	39	13	7	19	54	63	−9	33	
12	Stenhousemuir	39	10	10	19	43	67	−24	30	
13	Meadowbank Thistle	39	6	10	23	43	89	−46	22	
14	Brechin City	39	7	6	26	45	73	−28	20	

Source: "1977-1978 Second Division - SPFL Archive". SPFL.
Rules for classification: 1) points; 2) goal difference; 3) number of goals scored.
(C) Champions; (P) Promoted
