= Glasgow Charity Cup =

Knockout football tournament

Glasgow Merchants Charity Cup
- Sport: Football
- Founded: 1877
- Folded: 1966
- No. of teams: various from Glasgow few from elsewhere in Scotland few from England
- Country: Scotland; England (from 1962 to 1966)
- Last champion: Glasgow Select (3rd title)
- Most titles: Rangers (32 titles)

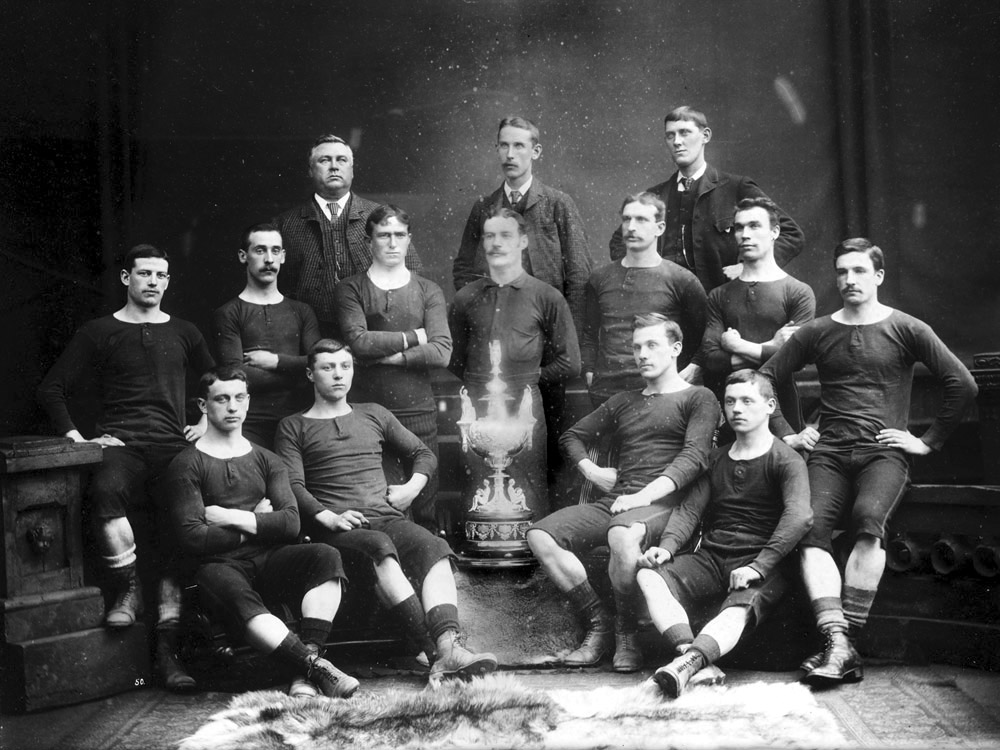
Group photo of the Renton team with the Glasgow Merchants Charity Cup, which they won four times in succession in the 1880s before participation was limited to clubs from within the city

The Glasgow Merchants' Charity Cup was a knockout football tournament open to teams from in and around Glasgow and later on in the tournament's history, teams from outwith Glasgow. Invitations were made and sent out by the Glasgow Charity Cup Committee (GCCC) at their discretion, but no criteria were ever published.

Like many domestic competitions in Scottish football, it was dominated by the Old Firm of Rangers and Celtic, with 31 and 28 victories each respectively. In the latter years of the tournament, it ceased being a knockout tournament and became a one-off contest between a Glasgow Select and a team invited from the English League.

== Clubs ==
The early years of the tournament featured teams from outside Glasgow. The committee often invited teams based on name and popularity.

Half of the eight-team draw for the 1887–88 tournament included Hibernian, Dumbarton, Renton, and Vale of Leven. All four clubs were former Scottish Cup winners from outside the city.

== Charity ==
After Renton were presented with the trophy by the Lord Provost of Glasgow in 1886, it was revealed a total of £5620 had been raised for local charities since the tournament had been instituted (equivalent to almost £750,000 in 2021 rates). An academic study in 2008 calculated that during its 90-year existence the competition raised funds to the value of £11 million.

A portion of the proceeds from 1887–88 went Edinburgh and Dunbartonshire charities, as teams from these areas competed for the cup too.

== Finals ==
Season	Winners	Score	Runners-up	Venue	Attendance
1876–77	Queens Park (1)	4–0	Rangers	1st Hampden Park	10,000
1877–78	Queens Park (2)	1–0	Vale of Leven	1st Hampden Park	3,000
1878–79	Rangers (1)	2–1	Vale of Leven	1st Hampden Park	10,000
1879–80	Queen's Park	1–1	Rangers	1st Hampden Park	6,500
1879–80 (R)	Queen's Park (3)	2–1	Rangers	Kinning Park	5,500
1880–81	Queen's Park	1–1	Rangers	1st Hampden Park	6,000
1880–81 (R)	Queen's Park (4)	3–1	Rangers	Kinning Park	10,000
1881–82	Vale of Leven	2–2	Dumbarton	1st Hampden Park	7,000
1881–82 (R)	Vale of Leven (1)	1–0	Dumbarton	1st Hampden Park	10,000
1882–83	Queen's Park (5)	4–1	Rangers	1st Hampden Park	8,000
1883–84	Queen's Park	1–1	Third Lanark	1st Cathkin Park	5,000
1883–84 (R)	Queen's Park (6)	8–0	Third Lanark	Titwood Park	4,000
1884–85	Queen's Park (7)	1–0	Dumbarton	2nd Hampden Park	2,241
1885–86	Renton (1)	3–1	Vale of Leven	2nd Hampden Park	4,000
1886–87	Renton (2)	1–0	Vale of Leven	2nd Hampden Park	10,000
1887–88	Renton (3)	4–0	Cambuslang	2nd Hampden Park	5,000
1888–89	Renton	2–2	Queen's Park	2nd Hampden Park	8,982
1889 (R)	Renton (4)	3–1	Queen's Park	2nd Hampden Park	7,380
1889–90	Third Lanark (1)	2–1	Queen's Park	2nd Hampden Park	8,102
1890–91	Queen's Park	1–1	Northern	2nd Hampden Park	2,204
1891 (R)	Queen's Park (8)	9–1	Northern	2nd Hampden Park	1,562
1891 (R)	Due to a scheduling dispute, Celtic, Rangers and Third Lanark declined to compete, instead setting up a League Charity Cup for fundraising purposes – Dumbarton were invited to join them and won the trophy.			2nd Hampden Park	1,562
1891–92	Celtic (1)	2–0	Rangers	1st Celtic Park	7,000
1892–93	Celtic (2)	5–0	Rangers	1st Celtic Park	5,000
1893–94	Celtic (3)	2–1	Queen's Park	1st Ibrox Park	12,000
1894–95	Celtic (4)	4–0	Rangers	1st Cathkin Park	10,000
1895–96	Celtic (5)	2–1 (aet)	Queen's Park	1st Ibrox Park	12,000
1896–97	Rangers (2)	6–1	Third Lanark	2nd Hampden Park	10,000
1897–98	Third Lanark (2)	1–0	Rangers	1st Cathkin Park	8,000
1898–99	Celtic (6)	2–0	Rangers	2nd Hampden Park	20,000
1899–1900	Rangers (3)	5–1	Celtic	2nd Hampden Park	15,000
1900–01	Third Lanark	0–0	Celtic	Gilmorehill	12,000
1900–01 (R)	Third Lanark (3)	3–0	Celtic	Gilmorehill	7,000
1901–02	Hibernian (1)	6–2	Celtic	2nd Hampden Park	8,000
1901–02	Tournament extended to produce more matches, proceeds going to the 1902 Ibrox disaster benefit fund.			2nd Hampden Park	8,000
1902–03	Celtic (7)	5–2	St Mirren	1st Cathkin Park	14,000
1903–04	Rangers (4)	5–2	Celtic	Hampden Park	25,000
1904–05	Celtic (8)	2–0	Partick Thistle	Ibrox Park	12,000
1905–06	Rangers (5)	3–2	Queen's Park	Hampden Park	26,000
1906–07	Rangers (6)	1–0	Celtic	Ibrox Park	35,000
1907–08	Celtic (9)	3–0	Queen's Park	Hampden Park	31,000
1908–09	Rangers (7)	4–2	Celtic	Celtic Park	25,000
1909–10	Clyde (1)	1–1	Third Lanark	Hampden Park	20,000
1909–10	Clyde won 8–3 on corners.			Hampden Park	20,000
1910–11	Rangers (8)	2–1	Celtic	Hampden Park	25,000
1911–12	Celtic (10)	0–0	Clyde	Hampden Park	25,000
1911–12	Celtic won 7–2 on corners.			Hampden Park	25,000
1912–13	Celtic (11)	3–2	Rangers	Celtic Park	30,000
1913–14	Celtic (12)	6–0	Third Lanark	Hampden Park	8,000
1914–15	Celtic (13)	3–2	Rangers	Ibrox Park	30,000
1915–16	Celtic (14)	2–0	Partick Thistle	Hampden Park	25,000
1916–17	Celtic (15)	1–0	Queen's Park	Hampden Park	35,000
1917–18	Celtic (16)	2–0	Partick Thistle	Hampden Park	30,000
1918–19	Rangers (9)	2–1	Queen's Park	Hampden Park	50,000
1919–20	Celtic (17)	1–0	Queen's Park	Hampden Park	45,000
1920–21	Celtic (18)	2–0	Rangers	Hampden Park	55,000
1921–22	Rangers (10)	3–1	Queen's Park	Hampden Park	43,000
1922–23	Rangers (11)	4–0	Queen's Park	Ibrox Park	35,000
1923–24	Celtic (19)	2–1	Rangers	Hampden Park	27,000
1924–25	Rangers (12)	1–0	Clyde	Ibrox Park	
1925–26	Celtic (20)	2–1	Queen's Park	Ibrox Park	24,000
1926–27	Partick Thistle (1)	6–3 (aet)	Rangers	Hampden Park	18,599
1927–28	Rangers (13)	3–1	Queen's Park	Celtic Park	27,000
1928–29	Rangers (14)	4–2	Celtic	Firhill Park	25,288
1929–30	Rangers (15)	2–2	Celtic	Hampden Park	35,667
1929–30	Rangers won on toss of a coin.			Hampden Park	
1930–31	Rangers (16)	2–1	Queen's Park	Hampden Park	26,000
1931–32	Rangers (17)	6–1	Third Lanark	Hampden Park	
1932–33	Rangers (18)	1–0	Queen's Park	Hampden Park	25,000
1933–34	Rangers (19)	1–0	Celtic	Hampden Park	36,000
1934–35	Partick Thistle (2)	2–1	Queen's Park	Hampden Park	16,550
1935–36	Celtic (21)	4–2	Rangers	Hampden Park	43,000
1936–37	Celtic (22)	4–3	Queen's Park	Hampden Park	21,000
1937–38	Celtic (23)	2–0	Rangers	Hampden Park	40,000
1938–39	Rangers (20)	0–0	Third Lanark	Hampden Park	29,448
1938–39	Rangers won 7–4 on corners.			Hampden Park	
1939–40	Rangers (21)	1–1	Clyde	Hampden Park	12,924
1939–40	Rangers won 7–2 on corners.			Hampden Park	
1940–41	Rangers (22)	3–0	Partick Thistle	Hampden Park	25,000
1941–42	Rangers (23)	3–1	Clyde	Hampden Park	
1942–43	Celtic (24)	3–0	Third Lanark	Hampden Park	25,000
1943–44	Rangers (24)	2–1	Clyde	Hampden Park	38,549
1944–45	Rangers (25)	2–1	Celtic	Hampden Park	50,000
1945–46	Rangers (26)	2–0	Third Lanark	Hampden Park	
1946–47	Rangers (27)	1–0	Celtic	Ibrox Park	40,000
1947–48	Rangers (28)	2–0	Celtic	Hampden Park	69,000
1948–49	Partick Thistle (3)	2–1 (aet)	Celtic	Hampden Park	
1949–50	Celtic (25)	3–2	Rangers	Hampden Park	81,000
1950–51	Rangers (29)	2–0	Partick Thistle	Hampden Park	30,000
1951–52	Clyde (2)	2–2	Third Lanark (4)	Hampden Park	25,000
1951–52	Clyde and Third Lanark shared the trophy.			Hampden Park	
1952–53	Celtic (26)	3–1	Queen's Park	Hampden Park	41,156
1953–54	Third Lanark (5)	1–0	Rangers	Hampden Park	18,040
1954–55	Rangers (30)	3–1	Queen's Park	Hampden Park	15,552
1955–56	Third Lanark (6)	4–2	Partick Thistle	Hampden Park	15,000
1956–57	Rangers (31)	2–1	Queen's Park	Ibrox Park	22,000
1957–58	Clyde (3)	4–0	Rangers	Hampden Park	18,000
1958–59	Celtic (27)	5–0	Clyde	Hampden Park	20,000
1959–60	Rangers (32)	2–0	Partick Thistle	Hampden Park	8,296
1960–61	Celtic (28)	1–1	Clyde (5)	Hampden Park	12,061
1960–61	Celtic and Clyde shared the trophy.			Hampden Park	12,061
1961–62	Not held - moved from end-of-season event in May 1961 to start-of-season event in August 1962.				
1962–63	Manchester United (1)	4–2	Glasgow Select	Hampden Park	82,000
1963–64	Glasgow Select (1)	2–1	Manchester United	Hampden Park	48,576
1964–65	Glasgow Select (2)	4–3	Tottenham Hotspur	Hampden Park	58,768
1965–66	Chelsea (1)	3–0	Glasgow Select	Hampden Park	36,000
1966–67	Glasgow Select (3)	1–1	Leeds United (1)	Hampden Park	15,000
1966–67	Glasgow Select and Leeds United shared the trophy.			Hampden Park	15,000
1967–68	Glasgow Select v Arsenal was scheduled for August. Poor conditions and continuous conflicts with rescheduling meant tie was never played.				

== Performance by club ==
Club	Wins	Last win	Runners-up	Last final lost
Rangers	32	1960	19	1958
Celtic	28 (Note: Includes one shared (1961 with Clyde).)	1961	14	1949
Queen's Park	8	1891	20	1957
Third Lanark	6 (Note: Includes one shared (1952 with Clyde).)	1956	8	1946
Clyde	4 (Note: Includes two shared (1952 with Third Lanark and 1961 with Celtic).)	1961	6	1959
Renton	4	1889	—	—
Partick Thistle	3	1949	7	1960
Glasgow Select	3 (Note: Includes one shared (1966 with Leeds United).)	1966	2	1965
Vale of Leven	1	1882	4	1887
Manchester United	1	1962	1	1963
Hibernian	1	1902	—	—
Chelsea	1	1965	—	—
Leeds United	1 (Note: Includes one shared (1966 with Glasgow Select).)	1966	—	—
Dumbarton	—	—	2	1885
Cambuslang	—	—	1	1888
Northern	—	—	1	1891
St Mirren	—	—	1	1903
Tottenham Hotspur	—	—	1	1964

== See also ==
- Rosebery Charity Cup
- Glasgow Cup
