= Clyde F.C. =

Association football club from Scotland

Clyde
- Full name: Clyde Football Club
- Nickname: The Bully Wee
- Founded: 1877; 149 years ago
- Ground: New Douglas Park, Hamilton
- Capacity: 6,018
- Coordinates: 55.782147°N 4.057895°W
- Chairman: John Taylor
- Manager: Darren Young
- League: Scottish League Two
- 2025–26: Scottish League Two, 3rd of 10
- Website: www.clydefc.co.uk
| Home colours | Away colours |

Clyde Football Club is a Scottish semi-professional football club based in Hamilton, South Lanarkshire, who play in Scottish League Two. Nicknamed the Bully Wee, the club was formed in 1877 on the banks of the River Clyde in Glasgow. They currently host their home matches at New Douglas Park in Hamilton, having previously played at Shawfield Stadium from 1898 to 1986 and Broadwood Stadium in Cumbernauld from 1994 until 2022.

The club has won the Scottish Cup on three occasions: 1939, 1955, and 1958, and reached the final a further three times, all during their long period based at Shawfield in Rutherglen. Clyde have not competed in the top division of Scottish football since 1975.

The club has been managed by Darren Young since October 2024.

== History ==
=== 1877–1898 ===
Clyde Football Club was founded on the banks of the River Clyde at Barrowfield. Records from the SFA and contemporary match reports in the Glasgow press show the club was established in 1877:

"Clyde:- Founded 1877; Membership 50; Grounds (private), Barrowfield Park, on the banks of the Clyde; ten minutes walk from Bridgeton Cross; Club House on grounds; Colours, White & Blue. Hon. Secretary, John D. Graham, 24 Monteith Row."

Sitting on the edge of Bridgeton, Barrowfield Park lay within a triangle of land enclosed by Carstairs Street, Colvend Street, and the River Clyde. The surrounding area contained chemical, engineering, and textile works with high population density. The ground consisted of a grandstand running north–south, a pavilion and tennis courts at the southern end, and a running and bicycle track surrounding the pitch. Barrowfield was initially shared with a short-lived club named Albatross.

At its inception, Clyde operated as a private members' club with sporting and cultural activities that included rowing alongside football.

The first mention of Clyde appeared in the Evening Times on 17 September 1877:

"Clyde v T. Lanark Clyde opened their season at Barrowfield with a match against the 3rd Lanark Volunteers. In the end, the 3rd were victors by three goals to 1."

Clyde entered the first round of the Scottish Cup on 29 September 1877, losing 1–0 to Third Lanark.

On 6 March 1883, the Glasgow Football Association was established, with Clyde being one of the six clubs represented at the initial meeting. The club is one of only three founding member clubs still in existence today, alongside Queen's Park and Rangers.

Clyde joined the Scottish Football League in 1891 for its second season. In their opening league fixture on 15 August 1891, Clyde defeated Vale of Leven 10–3, completing the season in mid-table. Due to growing spectator numbers and drainage issues at Barrowfield, the pitch was relaid with an ash base in 1893 to improve drainage.

During the late 19th century, Clyde won the North Eastern Cup four times and the Graham Cup three times. In their final season at Barrowfield, Clyde finished bottom of Division One with five points, but retained their top-flight status through re-election. The final fixture at Barrowfield was a 3–3 friendly draw against Sunderland on 30 April 1898.

=== 1899–1919 ===
In 1898, the club acquired land at Shawfield between the Glasgow neighbourhood of Oatlands and the town of Rutherglen. The purchase was financed through incorporation as "The Clyde Football Club Limited", developing a ground with an initial grandstand seating capacity of 1,500.

Chart of historic table positions of Clyde in the League.

The opening match at Shawfield Stadium on 27 August 1898 was a 0–0 draw against Celtic, attended by 10,000 spectators. Clyde finished bottom of the top division in 1899–1900 and were relegated.

They were Division Two champions in 1904–05 and runners-up in 1903–04 and 1905–06, securing promotion following the 1905–06 campaign under the election system in place before automatic promotion was introduced in 1921.

Between 1908 and 1913, Clyde maintained top-half finishes in Division One and reached the Scottish Cup final in 1910 and 1912. The team finished third in the league in 1908–09 and 1911–12, and reached the Scottish Cup semi-finals in 1908–09 and 1912–13.

In the 1910 Scottish Cup final, Clyde led Dundee 2–0 until the 83rd minute, before an own goal and a late equaliser forced a 2–2 draw. Following a 0–0 draw in the replay, Dundee won the second replay 2–1. In the 1912 final, Clyde were defeated 2–0 by Celtic.

International honours were first awarded to an active Clyde player in March 1909, when William Walker represented Scotland against club teammate Jack Kirwan of Ireland at Ibrox. Clyde also won the Glasgow Merchants Charity Cup in 1910 and the Glasgow Cup in 1914.

In September 1914, a fire destroyed the Shawfield grandstand and club records. Following the outbreak of World War I, several players enlisted in the armed forces; among those killed in action were Charles Clunas, Tom Cranston, and William Sharp. Wartime restrictions caused player shortages, leading the Scottish League to temporarily contract to a single division.

=== 1920–1945 ===
Division Two was reinstated for the 1921–22 season with automatic promotion and relegation. Relegated in 1923–24, Clyde spent two seasons in Division Two before earning promotion and winning the Glasgow Cup in 1925–26. Between 1926 and 1939, Clyde remained in Division One. Scotland international caps were awarded to Clyde full-back Danny Blair and forward Billy Boyd, who scored 32 league goals in 1932–33.

Facing financial difficulties in 1930, the club leased Shawfield to greyhound racing promoters, leading to the creation of the Shawfield Greyhound Racing Company Ltd, which began racing in 1932 and subsequently purchased the stadium from the football club in 1935.

During the 1938–39 Scottish Cup campaign, Clyde conceded one goal en route to the final, with victories over St Johnstone (2–0), Dundee (0–0, 1–0 replay), and Third Lanark (1–0), and a semi-final win over Hibernian (1–0 at Tynecastle). In the third round, centre-forward Willie Martin scored all four goals in a 4–1 victory against Rangers at Ibrox.

In the final at Hampden on 22 April 1939, Clyde defeated Motherwell 4–0 before 94,000 spectators to win their first Scottish Cup, with goals from Dougie Wallace, Willie Martin (two), and Noble.

The outbreak of World War II led to the suspension of official league football in 1939–40. Clyde participated in the regionalised Southern League, finishing runners-up to Rangers in 1940–41. In 1946, the Scottish League Cup was introduced; Clyde and SFL chairman John McMahon donated the trophy that remains in use today.

=== 1946–1969 ===
In 1947, Clyde completed a 20-match tour of South Africa (recording 16 wins, 2 draws, and 2 defeats). In 1953, Stanley Matthews appeared for Clyde as a guest player alongside Ernie Taylor in a benefit match against Everton at Celtic Park in Belfast.

Clyde reached the Scottish Cup final in 1948–49, losing 4–1 to Rangers at Hampden before 108,000 spectators, with Peter Galletly scoring Clyde's goal. Relegated from Division A in 1950–51, the club returned immediately as Division B champions in 1951–52, repeating this promotion in 1956–57. Floodlights were installed at Shawfield in March 1954, inaugurated with a friendly against Huddersfield Town.

Clyde won the Scottish Cup in 1954–55 and 1957–58, and were semi-finalists in 1955–56 and 1959–60. In the 1955 final on 23 April, Clyde drew 1–1 with Celtic before 96,000 spectators after Archie Robertson scored directly from a corner kick in the 87th minute; Clyde won the replay 1–0 through a Tommy Ring goal. In the 1958 final on 26 April, a goal from John Coyle secured a 1–0 victory over Hibernian before 94,000 fans. Following the 1957–58 season, three Clyde players—Harry Haddock, Archie Robertson, and John Coyle—were selected in the Scotland squad for the 1958 FIFA World Cup.

In the 1966–67 season, Clyde finished third in the league behind Celtic and Rangers and reached the Scottish Cup semi-finals. However, the club was not entered into the Inter-Cities Fairs Cup due to the tournament's "one city, one club" rule, as second-placed Rangers took Glasgow's allocated spot.

In 1969, Clyde undertook a 10-match tour of Rhodesia, finishing unbeaten with nine wins and one draw.

=== 1970–1993 ===
Following relegation in 1971–72, Clyde won promotion as Division Two champions in 1972–73. They were relegated again in 1974–75, missing qualification for the new ten-team Premier Division introduced for the 1975–76 season.

Clyde finished bottom of the First Division in 1975–76, entering the third tier for the first time. Under manager Craig Brown, appointed in 1977, the team won the Second Division title in 1977–78. In 1979–80, Clyde became the first Scottish club to adopt a shirt sponsor, securing a deal with the British Oxygen Company.

In 1986, the Greyhound Racing Association served notice to quit Shawfield. Clyde played their final match at the stadium on 28 April 1986, defeating Alloa Athletic 4–2. The club ground-shared at Firhill with Partick Thistle from 1986 to 1991, followed by a ground-share with Hamilton Academical at Douglas Park from 1991 to 1994, while plans were developed for a new purpose-built stadium in Cumbernauld.

=== 1994–2022 ===
Clyde moved to Broadwood Stadium in Cumbernauld in February 1994, hosting their inaugural match on 5 February 1994 against Hamilton Academical before a crowd of 6,000.

Under manager Allan Maitland, Clyde won promotion to the First Division in 1999–2000. In the 2003–04 season, Clyde finished second in the First Division, one place outside the promotion spot to the SPL. In June 2005, the club completed a Company Voluntary Arrangement (CVA) to clear accumulated debts.

On 8 January 2006, Clyde defeated Celtic 2–1 in the third round of the Scottish Cup at Broadwood, with goals from Eddie Malone and Craig Bryson, in a match featuring the Celtic debut of Roy Keane. Later that year, Clyde reached the 2006 Scottish Challenge Cup Final, drawing 1–1 with Ross County before losing 5–4 on penalties.

Following consecutive relegations in 2008–09 and 2009–10, Clyde dropped into the Third Division (fourth tier). Under manager Danny Lennon, Clyde won promotion back to League One at the end of the 2018–19 season after defeating Annan Athletic 2–1 on aggregate in the play-off final.

In April 2022, Clyde confirmed they would leave Broadwood at the end of the 2021–22 season to groundshare at New Douglas Park in Hamilton from the start of the 2022–23 season while exploring long-term stadium options.

== Grounds ==
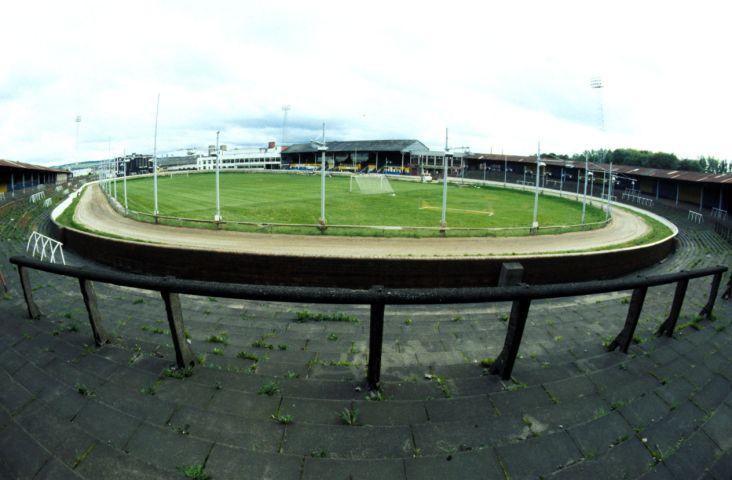
Shawfield in 1985

=== Barrowfield ===
Clyde's first home ground was Barrowfield Park, located on the banks of the River Clyde between Bridgeton and Dalmarnock, used from 1877 to 1898.

=== Shawfield ===
In 1898, the club moved across the river to Shawfield Stadium. The ground's record attendance was set on 28 November 1908 when 52,000 spectators attended a match against Rangers. Due to financial pressures, Clyde sold ownership of the stadium to the Greyhound Racing Association in 1935, remaining as tenants until receiving notice to vacate in 1986.

=== Broadwood ===
Clyde moved to the all-seater Broadwood Stadium in Cumbernauld in February 1994, hosting their inaugural match on 5 February 1994 against Hamilton Academical before a crowd of 6,000. During Clyde's tenancy, Broadwood hosted Scotland U21 fixtures and four Scottish Challenge Cup finals, and served as a temporary venue for Airdrieonians (1994–1998) and Rangers reserves.

In December 2010, Clyde announced their intention to relinquish their lease at Broadwood and explore relocation options. On 20 April 2013, the club's supporter-owners voted in favour of a proposed move to East Kilbride, though the plan was later abandoned. The club also explored a potential ground-sharing redevelopment in Rutherglen with Rutherglen Glencairn. Clyde concluded their 28-year tenancy at Broadwood in April 2022.

=== Groundshares ===
During their history, Clyde have engaged in several ground-sharing arrangements:

- Celtic Park: Utilised temporarily in 1914 after a fire damaged the Shawfield grandstand.
- Firhill Stadium: Shared with Partick Thistle between 1986 and 1991.
- Douglas Park: Shared with Hamilton Academical from 1991 to 1994.
- New Douglas Park: Shared with Hamilton Academical since July 2022.

== Supporters ==
Clyde Football Club is 100% owned by its supporters through a Community Interest Company structure.

The supporters' traditional rivalries are with Partick Thistle and Queen's Park. Due to the years the club spent ground-sharing without a permanent home, supporters adopted the nickname the "Gypsy Army".

The Clyde Supporters' Trust was established during the 2003–04 season to assist in restructuring the club's finances and establish supporter ownership.

Supporters also organise two amateur teams: Bully Wee United (representing the club in the Internet Football Association League with matches played on Saturday mornings) and Broadwood Clyde (established in 1994 in the Scottish Central Amateur League).

=== The Clyde View ===
The Clyde View is Clyde's official matchday programme. It won the Scottish Programme of the Year Award every season from 1995–96 to 2006–07, and again in 2008–09, as well as divisional awards from 1991–92 to 2011–12.

== Nickname ==
The club's nickname, "The Bully Wee", has three traditional explanations:

1. It derived from Bridgeton's working-class population, who were reputed locally as "wee bullies".
2. A phonetic misinterpretation around 1900 of French supporters calling "But il y est, oui?" ("A goal, yes?").
3. The Victorian slang usage of "bully" meaning "first-rate" or "fine", describing the smaller club as "Bully Wee Clyde".

== Rivalries ==
Historically based in Glasgow, local rivalries were developed with other teams from in and around the city, in particular Celtic, Rangers, Partick Thistle, Queen's Park, and Third Lanark. For much of the 20th century, these clubs frequently met in the top division as well as in the Glasgow Cup and Glasgow Merchants Charity Cup.

The rivalry with Partick Thistle developed as a derby between two smaller Glasgow clubs outside the Old Firm. The dynamic intensified when Clyde ground-shared at Firhill between 1986 and 1991. The rivalry was highlighted in May 2002 when player Jamie Mitchell's transfer from Clyde to Partick Thistle drew strong reaction from supporters. Following divisional separation during the 2010s, league derbies between the clubs resumed in the 2020–21 season in Scottish League One.

During the 2010s, a regular lower-division rivalry also developed with Queen's Park, with both clubs competing in League Two for much of the decade.

Following Clyde's relocation to Cumbernauld in 1994 and subsequent ground-sharing in Hamilton, matches against Lanarkshire clubs—including Airdrieonians, Albion Rovers, Motherwell, and Hamilton Academical—have also developed local significance as Lanarkshire derbies.

== Managers ==
The club has appointed 35 permanent managers in its history.

- William Aitken (1900–1905)
- Walter Jack (1905–1909)
- Alec Maley (1909–1912)
- John James Commins (1912–1922)
- Frank Thompson (1922–1935)
- Russell Moreland (1935–1937)
- Paddy Travers (1937–1956)
- Johnny Haddow (1956–1962)
- John Prentice (1962–1966)
- Davie White (1966–1967)
- Archie Wright (1967)
- Archie Robertson (1968–1973)
- Stan Anderson (1973–1977)
- Billy McNeill (1977)
- Craig Brown (1977–1986)
- John Clark (1986–1992)
- Alex Smith (1992–1996)
- Gardner Speirs (1996–1998)
- Ronnie McDonald (1998)
- Allan Maitland (1998–2002)
- Alan Kernaghan (2002–2004)
- Billy Reid (2004–2005)
- Graham Roberts (2005–2006)
- Joe Miller (2006–2007)
- Colin Hendry (2007–2008)
- John Brown (2008–2009)
- John McCormack (2009–2010)
- Stuart Millar (2010–2011)
- Jim Duffy (2011–2014)
- Barry Ferguson (2014–2017)
- Jim Chapman (2017)
- Danny Lennon (2017–2022)
- Jim Duffy (2022–2023)
- Brian McLean (2023)
- Ian McCall (2023–2024)
- Darren Young (2024–present)

== First-team squad ==
As of 27 October 2026

Note: Flags indicate national team as defined under FIFA eligibility rules; some limited exceptions apply. Players may hold more than one non-FIFA nationality.

| No. | Pos. | Nation | Player |
|---|---|---|---|
| 1 | GK | SCO | Jay Hogarth (on loan from Falkirk) |
| 2 | DF | SCO | Darren Hynes |
| 3 | DF | SCO | Lewis Lovering |
| 4 | DF | SCO | Sam Campbell |
| 5 | DF | SCO | Craig Howie |
| 6 | MF | SCO | Bruce Strachan |
| 7 | MF | SCO | Marley Redfern |
| 8 | MF | SCO | Barry Cuddihy |
| 9 | FW | SCO | Scott Williamson |
| 10 | MF | SCO | James Hilton |
| 11 | FW | SCO | Kyle Connell |
| 12 | GK | SCO | Jude Smith |
| 14 | MF | SCO | Jamie Bradley |

| No. | Pos. | Nation | Player |
|---|---|---|---|
| 15 | DF | SCO | Logan Dunachie |
| 16 | FW | SCO | Thomas Cruden |
| 17 | FW | SCO | Nathan Cannon |
| 18 | DF | SCO | Liam Rooney (on loan from Partick Thistle) |
| 19 | FW | SCO | Timam Scott |
| 20 | FW | SCO | Bobby Kiltie |
| 21 | GK | SCO | Daniel Terry |
| 22 | MF | SCO | Kyle Fleming |
| 23 | MF | SCO | Keir Gilligan (co-operation loan with Dundee United) |
| 24 | MF | SCO | Jamie Forrest (co-operation loan with Dundee United) |
| 25 | DF | SCO | Chris Inglis |
| 26 | MF | SCO | Jack Anderson (co-operation loan with Dundee United) |
| 27 | MF | SCO | Andy Murdoch (captain) |

== Club officials ==
=== Board ===
- Chairman: John Taylor
- Directors: David Hunter, Graeme Kelly, Gordon Nisbet, Gordon Thomson
- Finance director: Harry Paterson
- Governance director: Bryan Macpherson
- Media and communications director: Sean Hart
- Associate directors: Andrew Clark, Steven Powell

=== Coaching staff ===
- Manager: Darren Young
- Assistant manager: Neil Scally
- Goalkeeping coach: James Evans
- Physiotherapist: Alistair Gray
- Sports scientist: Owen Murphy

== Reserve and youth teams ==
=== Reserve League Cup ===
Clyde entered a reserve team in the SFL's Reserve League Cup competition, which included a combination of first-team fringe players and youth squad members. The club won the Reserve League Cup in May 2008, defeating Livingston 4–1 at Almondvale, with Dave McKay scoring all four goals for Clyde.

=== Reserve team history ===
| League | Seasons |
|---|---|
| Scottish Football Federation | 1898–99 |
| Scottish Football Alliance | 1896–97, 1919–21, 1937–38, 1939–40, 1956–57 |
| Scottish Reserve League | 1909–11, 1913–15, 1938–39, 1945–49, 1955–56, 1957–61, 1962–63, 1964–65, 1969–72, 1973–75 |
| Scottish C Division South & West | 1949–55 |
| Combined Reserve Football League | 1961–62, 1963–64, 1975–76 |
| Scottish Reserve League (West) | 1979–81, 1983–93, 1994–97, 1998–2001 |
| Scottish Reserve League (West 'A') | 1993–94 |

==== 'A' Team ====
From the early era of reserve football, reserve sides typically competed under the designation 'A' or 'B'. Following the creation of the Scottish Reserve League in 1955, the club's second team adopted the formal title 'reserves' from 1957.

In 1913–14, Clyde won the Scottish 2nd XI Cup, defeating St Mirren over two legs (1–1 away, 3–1 at home), and successfully defended the trophy in 1914–15 against Falkirk. A third title was secured in 1941–42. In 1949–50 and 1950–51, Clyde's reserve side won consecutive Scottish C Division (South & West) championships.

=== Youth teams ===
The club operated youth teams at various age groups between under-11 and under-20 levels. In 2015, Clyde restructured their youth academy due to funding changes, retaining the under-20 side as a feeder to the first team.

==== Graduates ====
Graduates of the youth system who progressed to the first team include:

- Jamie Prunty
- Martin O'Neill
- Craig McEwan
- Brian Carrigan
- Paul Brownlie
- Michael O'Neill
- Paul Campbell
- John McLay
- Stuart Coleman
- Lorn Gibson
- Gary McPhee
- Gary Robertson
- Paul Stewart
- Paul Hay
- Graham McGhee
- Mark Gilhaney
- Paul Doyle
- Billy Reid Jnr.
- John Baird
- Charlie Clark
- Robert Halliday
- Craig Bryson
- David Greenhill
- Graeme McCracken
- Kevin Bradley
- John Paul McKeever
- Robert Harris
- Sean McKenna
- Ruari MacLennan
- David McGowan
- Michael Doherty
- Stephen Connolly
- Roddy MacLennan
- Jordan Murch
- Connor Stevenson
- Jordan Allan
- Steven Howarth
- Darren Walker
- Connor Cassidy
- Kevin Higgins
- Daniel Fitzpatrick
- Jack Sloss
- Drew Ramsay
- Kieran Daw
- Grant Dickie
- Scott Ferguson
- Fraser McGhee
- Gordon Young
- William Robb

== Hall of Fame ==
Hall of Fame Inductees

- The Dunn family (2011)
- (Scotland) George Herd (2011)
- (Scotland) Davie Laing (2011)
- (Scotland) Tommy McCulloch (2011)
- (Scotland) Pat Nevin (2011)
- (Scotland) Craig Brown (2012)
- (Scotland) Harry Hood (2012)
- (Scotland) Harry Haddock (2012)
- The 1966–67 Clyde squad (2014)
- (Scotland) Brian Ahern (2015)
- (Scotland) Keith Knox (2016)
- (Scotland) Tommy Ring (2016)
- (Scotland) Neil Hood (2017)

== Honours ==
=== League ===
- Scottish Division One (Level 1)
  - Third place: 1908–09, 1911–12, 1966–67
- Scottish Division Two (Level 2)
  - Winners (5): 1904–05, 1951–52, 1956–57, 1961–62, 1972–73
  - Runners-up: 1903–04, 1905–06, 1925–26, 1963–64
- SFL First Division (Level 2)
  - Runners-up: 2002–03, 2003–04
- SFL Second Division (Level 3)
  - Winners (4): 1977–78, 1981–82, 1992–93, 1999–2000
- SPFL League Two (Level 4)
  - Play-off Winners: 2018–19

=== Cup ===
- Scottish Cup
  - Winners (3): 1938–39, 1954–55, 1957–58
  - Runners-up: 1909–10, 1911–12, 1948–49
- Scottish Challenge Cup
  - Runners-up: 2006–07
- B Division Supplementary Cup
  - Winners: 1951–52

=== Minor and local trophies ===
- Glasgow Cup (5): 1914–15, 1925–26, 1946–47, 1951–52, 1958–59
  - Runners-up: Fifteen times
- Glasgow Merchants Charity Cup (4): 1909–10, 1951–52, 1957–58, 1960–61
  - Runners-up: 1911–12, 1924–25, 1939–40, 1941–42, 1943–44, 1958–59
- Southern League
  - Runners-up: 1940–41
- Summer Cup
  - Runners-up: 1943–44
- West of Scotland League / Shield (2): 1904–05, 1906–07
  - Runners-up: 1905–06
- Glasgow North Eastern Cup (4): 1890–91, 1892–93, 1893–94, 1894–95
  - Runners-up: 1882–83, 1885–86
- Graham Charity Cup (3): 1888–89, 1889–90, 1890–91
- Paisley Charity Cup (2): 1938–39, 1939–40
  - Runners-up: 1944–45
- St Vincent de Paul Charity Cup
  - Runners-up: 1938
- Friendship Cup: 1960–61 (joint-winners)

=== Friendly trophies ===
- Keyline Challenge Cup (3): 1999, 2000, 2001
  - Runners-up: 2002
- Tommy McGrane Cup: 2006
- Broadwood Cup: 2020
- Optical Express Challenge Cup
  - Runners-up: 2005, 2009

=== Reserves ===
| Honour | Winners | Runners-up |
|---|---|---|
| Scottish Reserve League | | 1914 |
| Scottish Reserve League West | 1988 | |
| Scottish Football Alliance | | 1920, 1957 |
| Combined Reserve League | 1962 | |
| Scottish Second XI Cup | 1914, 1915, 1942 | 1897, 1938, 1939, 1946 |
| Reserve League Cup | 2008 | |
| Glasgow Second XI Cup | 1898 | 1913 |
| North Eastern Second XI Cup | 1892 | |

=== Youth ===
- League Cup (under 17s):
  - Runners-up: 2004
- Rangers Youth Invitational Tournament (under 13s): 2008
- Helensburgh Bi-Centennial Tournament (under 13s): 2002
- Kildrum United Football Festival (under 13s): 2007
- CKSSDA 11-a-side Tournament (under 12s): 2008

== Records ==
- Record home attendance: 52,000 vs Rangers (28 November 1908) (at Shawfield Stadium); 8,000 vs Celtic (Scottish Cup) (8 January 2006) (at Broadwood Stadium)
- Record win: 11–1 vs Cowdenbeath (6 October 1951), 10–0 vs Stranraer (14 August 1957)
- Record European win: 4–0 vs RC Lens (7 August 1960)
- Record loss: 11–0 vs Dumbarton (22 November 1897)
- Most capped player: Tommy Ring: 12 (Scotland)
- Most international goals: Tommy Ring: 2 (Scotland), Archie Robertson: 2 (Scotland)
- Most goals in one season: Billy McPhail: 36 (1951–52), Basil Keogh: 36 (1956–57)
- Youngest player: Connor Stevenson, aged 16 years and 245 days (against Queen of the South in the Scottish First Division on 15 April 2009)

=== All-time league appearances ===
(League only, includes appearances as substitute):

| | Name | Seasons | Appearances |
|---|---|---|---|
| 1 | Brian Ahern | 1971–1981; 1983–1987 | 420 |
| 2 | Tommy McCulloch | 1957–1972 | 378 |
| 3 | Ross McFarlane | 1983–1995 | 376 |
| 4 | Harry Haddock | 1949–1963 | 365 |
| 5 | John McHugh | 1961–1975 | 358 |
| 6 | Keith Knox | 1987–1997 | 322 |
| 7 | Eddie Anderson | 1969–1980 | 296 |
| 8 | Archie Robertson | 1949–1961 | 293 |
| 9 | Tommy Ring | 1950–1960 | 280 |
| 10 | Jim Burns | 1967–1976 | 270 |

=== All-time league goalscorers ===
(League only, includes appearances as substitute):

| | Name | Years | Goals |
|---|---|---|---|
| 1 | Tommy Ring | 1950–1960 | 124 |
| 2 | Archie Robertson | 1949–1961 | 121 |
| 3 | Billy Boyd | 1930–1933 | 91 |
| 4 | Billy McPhail | 1947–1956 | 90 |
| 5 | Neil Hood | 1975–1980; 1981–82 | 71 |
| 6 | Harry Hood | 1962–1965; 1966–1969 | 70 |
| 7 | John Buchanan | 1949–1955 | 69 |
| 8 | Danny Masterton | 1980–1984 | 67 |
| 9 | Brian Ahern | 1971–1981; 1983–1987 | 63 |
| 10 | Pat Keogh | 1998–2004 | 56 |

== Noted players ==
=== Internationalists ===
A list of players who received full international caps while playing for Clyde:

Ireland

- Frank Thompson (2 caps)
- Jack Kirwan (1 cap)

Northern Ireland

- Jack McGrillen (1 cap)
- Ned Weir (1 cap)

Republic of Ireland

- Albie Murphy (1 cap)
- Ned Weir (3 caps)

Scotland

- Alec Linwood (1 cap/1 goal)
- Archie Robertson (5 caps/2 goals)
- Billy Boyd (2 caps/1 goal)
- Danny Blair (7 caps)
- George Herd (5 caps/1 goal)
- Harry Hood (3 caps)
- Harry Haddock (6 caps)
- Hugh Long (1 cap)
- Jimmy Campbell (1 cap)
- John Brown (1 cap)
- Leslie Johnston (2 caps/1 goal)
- Tommy Ring (12 caps/2 goals)
- William Walker (2 caps)
