= 1951–52 in Scottish football =

Division A champions
- Hibernian

Division B champions
- Clyde

Division C (North & East) champions
- Dundee 'A'

Division C (South & West) champions
- Rangers 'A'

Scottish Cup winners
- Motherwell

League Cup winners
- Dundee

Division C League Cup winners
- Aberdeen 'A'

Junior Cup winners
- Kilbirnie Ladeside

Scotland national team
- 1952 BHC

The 1951–52 season was the 79th season of competitive football in Scotland and the 55th season of the Scottish Football League.

== Scottish League Division A ==
Pos	Team	Pld	W	D	L	GF	GA	GD	Pts
1	Hibernian	30	20	5	5	92	36	+56	45
2	Rangers	30	16	9	5	61	31	+30	41
3	East Fife	30	17	3	10	71	49	+22	37
4	Heart of Midlothian	30	14	7	9	69	53	+16	35
5	Raith Rovers	30	14	5	11	43	42	+1	33
6	Partick Thistle	30	12	7	11	48	51	−3	31
7	Motherwell	30	12	7	11	51	57	−6	31
8	Dundee	30	11	6	13	53	52	+1	28
9	Celtic	30	10	8	12	52	55	−3	28
10	Queen of the South	30	10	8	12	50	60	−10	28
11	Aberdeen	30	10	7	13	65	58	+7	27
12	Third Lanark	30	9	8	13	51	62	−11	26
13	Airdrieonians	30	11	4	15	54	69	−15	26
14	St Mirren	30	10	5	15	43	58	−15	25
15	Morton	30	9	6	15	49	56	−7	24
16	Stirling Albion	30	5	5	20	36	99	−63	15

Source: RSSSF

Champions: Hibernian
Relegated: Morton, Stirling Albion

== Scottish League Division B ==
Pos	Team	Pld	W	D	L	GF	GA	GD	Pts	Promotion or relegation
1	Clyde	30	19	6	5	100	45	+55	44	Promotion to the 1952–53 Division A
2	Falkirk	30	18	7	5	80	34	+46	43	Promotion to the 1952–53 Division A
3	Ayr United	30	17	5	8	55	45	+10	39	
4	Dundee United	30	16	5	9	75	60	+15	37	
5	Kilmarnock	30	16	2	12	62	48	+14	34	
6	Dunfermline Athletic	30	15	2	13	74	65	+9	32	
7	Alloa Athletic	30	13	6	11	55	49	+6	32	
8	Cowdenbeath	30	12	8	10	66	67	−1	32	
9	Hamilton Academical	30	12	6	12	47	51	−4	30	
10	Dumbarton	30	10	8	12	51	57	−6	28	
11	St Johnstone	30	9	7	14	62	68	−6	25	
12	Forfar Athletic	30	10	4	16	59	97	−38	24	
13	Stenhousemuir	30	8	6	16	57	74	−17	22	
14	Albion Rovers	30	6	10	14	39	57	−18	22	
15	Queen's Park	30	8	4	18	40	62	−22	20	
16	Arbroath	30	6	4	20	40	83	−43	16	

Source: "1951-1952 Division B - SPFL Archive". SPFL.

Promoted: Clyde, Falkirk

== Scottish League Division C ==
Section	Winner	Runner-up
South-West	Rangers 'A'	Morton 'A'
North-East	Dundee 'A'	Hearts 'A'

== Cup honours ==
Competition	Winner	Score	Runner-up
Scottish Cup	Motherwell	4–0	Dundee
League Cup	Dundee	3–2	Rangers
Junior Cup	Kilbirnie Ladeside	1–0	Camelon Juniors

== Other Honours ==
=== National ===
Competition	Winner	Score	Runner-up
B Division Supplementary Cup	Clyde	7 – 3 *	St Johnstone
Scottish Qualifying Cup - North	Buckie Thistle	4 – 3 *	Clachnacuddin
Scottish Qualifying Cup - South	Eyemouth United	3 – 2 *†	Newton Stewart
St Mungo Cup - Festival of Britain	Celtic	3 – 2	Aberdeen
St Mungo Quaich - Festival of Britain	Dumbarton	2 – 1	Ayr United

=== County ===
Competition	Winner	Score	Runner-up
Aberdeenshire Cup	Deveronvale	4 – 2	Huntly
Ayrshire Cup	Kilmarnock	4 – 3 *	Ayr United
East of Scotland Shield	Hibernian	3 – 0	Hearts
Fife Cup	East Fife	2 – 0	Cowdenbeath
Forfarshire Cup	Montrose	2 – 1	Arbroath
Glasgow Cup	Clyde	2 – 1	Celtic
Lanarkshire Cup	Motherwell	3 – 0	Hamilton
Renfrewshire Cup	Morton	3 – 2	Babcock & Wilcox
Stirlingshire Cup	Falkirk	2 – 0 †	Stirling Albion

- * - aggregate over two legs
- † - replay

=== Highland League ===
Top Three
Pos	Team	Pld	W	D	L	GF	GA	GD	Pts
1	Inverness Caledonian	28	23	3	2	111	35	+76	51 (Note: 2 bonus points awarded?)
2	Huntly	28	16	6	6	92	64	+28	38
3	Buckie Thistle	28	18	2	8	84	56	+28	38

== Scotland national team ==
Date	Venue	Opponents	Score	Competition	Scotland scorer(s)
6 October 1951	Windsor Park, Belfast (A)	Northern Ireland	3–0	BHC	Bobby Johnstone (2), Tommy Orr
14 November 1951	Hampden Park, Glasgow (H)	Wales	0–1	BHC	
5 April 1952	Hampden Park, Glasgow (H)	England	1–2	BHC	Lawrie Reilly
30 April 1952	Hampden Park, Glasgow (H)	United States	6–0	Friendly	Lawrie Reilly (3), Ian McMillan (2), own goal
25 May 1952	Idrætsparken, Copenhagen (A)	Denmark	2–1	Friendly	Willie Thornton, Lawrie Reilly
30 May 1952	Råsunda Stadium, Stockholm (A)	Sweden	1–3	Friendly	Billy Liddell

Key:

- (H) = Home match
- (A) = Away match
- BHC = British Home Championship
