= 2007–08 Scottish Premier League =

102nd season of top-tier football league in Scotland

Scottish Premier League
- Season: 2007–08
- Dates: 4 August 2007 – 22 May 2008
- Champions: Celtic; 6th Premier League title 42nd Scottish title
- Relegated: Gretna
- Champions League: Celtic; Rangers
- UEFA Cup: Motherwell
- Intertoto Cup: Hibernian
- Matches: 228
- Goals: 610 (2.68 per match)
- Top goalscorer: Scott McDonald (25)
- Biggest home win: Rangers 7–2 Falkirk (18 August); Inverness CT 6–1 Gretna (3 May); Celtic 5–0 Hearts (25 August); Celtic 5–0 Inverness CT (15 September)
- Biggest away win: Aberdeen 1–5 Celtic (10 February); St Mirren 1–5 Celtic (2 September); St Mirren 1–5 Falkirk (1 December); Gretna 0–4 Falkirk (4 August); Gretna 0–4 Inverness CT (27 October); Hearts 0–4 Rangers (27 February)
- Highest attendance: 60,000, Celtic 0–0 Kilmarnock (5 August)
- Lowest attendance: 431, Gretna 1–2 Inverness CT (5 April)

The 2007–08 Scottish Premier League season was the tenth season of the Scottish Premier League. It began on 4 August 2007 and was originally due to end on 18 May 2008. Due to the death of Phil O'Donnell and extremely poor weather causing the postponement of fixtures during the winter, as well as a backlog of Rangers fixtures and their progression to the UEFA Cup Final, the SPL decided to move the final round of fixtures back four days to 22 May 2008. It was the first season under the sponsorship of the Clydesdale Bank.

Gretna had been promoted from the First Division and played in the SPL for the first time, replacing Dunfermline Athletic. Gretna did not play at their home stadium Raydale Park as it did not meet the SPL stadia criteria of 6,000 and instead used Motherwell's Fir Park for all but one of their games; that match was at Livingston's Almondvale Stadium.

The championship was determined on the final day of the season with Celtic and Rangers even on 86 points. Celtic travelled to Tannadice to play Dundee United knowing that a win would likely secure the title due to their superior goal difference (+57 to +53). Meanwhile, Rangers needed to better Celtic's result in their match against Aberdeen at Pittodrie (or in the event of both winning, overhaul the goal difference). As it turned out, Celtic won 1–0 following Jan Vennegoor of Hesselink's second-half header, while Aberdeen beat Rangers 2–0 thanks to goals from Lee Miller and Steve Lovell.

Celtic qualified directly for the Champions League, while second-placed Rangers qualified for the Second qualifying round. Third-placed Motherwell qualified for the UEFA Cup and Hibernian qualified for the Intertoto Cup. First Division side Queen of the South also qualified for the UEFA Cup after reaching the Scottish Cup Final, losing to Rangers. Gretna were relegated after just one season in the SPL and were replaced by First Division champions Hamilton Academical for the following season.

== Clubs ==
=== Promotion and Relegation from 2006–07 ===
Promoted from First Division to Premier League

- Gretna

Relegated from Premier League to First Division

- Dunfermline Athletic

=== Stadia and locations ===
Aberdeen	Celtic	Dundee United	Falkirk
Pittodrie Stadium	Celtic Park	Tannadice Park	Falkirk Stadium
Capacity: 20,866	Capacity: 60,411	Capacity: 14,223	Capacity: 7,937
Gretna	Location of teams in 2007–08 Scottish Premier League		Heart of Midlothian
Fir Park, Motherwell	Location of teams in 2007–08 Scottish Premier League		Tynecastle Park
Capacity: 13,677	Location of teams in 2007–08 Scottish Premier League		Capacity: 17,420
Hibernian	Location of teams in 2007–08 Scottish Premier League		Inverness Caledonian Thistle
Easter Road	Location of teams in 2007–08 Scottish Premier League		Caledonian Stadium
Capacity: 17,500	Location of teams in 2007–08 Scottish Premier League		Capacity: 7,500
Kilmarnock	Motherwell	Rangers	St Mirren
Rugby Park	Fir Park	Ibrox Stadium	Love Street
Capacity: 17,889	Capacity: 13,677	Capacity: 50,817	Capacity: 10,800

=== Personnel and kits ===
Team	Manager	Kit manufacturer	Kit sponsor
Aberdeen	(Scotland) Jimmy Calderwood	Nike	Apex Tubulars
Celtic	(Scotland) Gordon Strachan	Nike	Carling
Dundee United	(Scotland) Craig Levein	hummel	Anglian Windows
Falkirk	(Scotland) John Hughes	Lotto	Central Demolition
Gretna	(Scotland) Mick Wadsworth (caretaker)	Crest Teamwear	Subway
Heart of Midlothian	(Scotland) Stephen Frail (caretaker)	Umbro	Ukio Bankas
Hibernian	(Finland) Mixu Paatelainen	Le Coq Sportif	Whyte and Mackay
Inverness Caledonian Thistle	(Scotland) Craig Brewster	Erreà	Flybe
Kilmarnock	(Scotland) Jim Jefferies	Lotto	www.smallworldmedia.com
Motherwell	(Scotland) Mark McGhee	Bukta	Anglian Home Improvements
Rangers	(Scotland) Walter Smith	Umbro	Carling
St Mirren	(Scotland) Gus MacPherson	hummel	Braehead Shopping Centre

==== Managerial changes ====
Team	Outgoing manager	Date of vacancy	Manner of departure	Position in table	Incoming manager	Date of appointment
Motherwell	(Scotland) Maurice Malpas	1 June 2007	Sacked	Pre-season	(Scotland) Mark McGhee	18 June 2007
Gretna	(Scotland) Rowan Alexander	14 June 2007	Sacked	Pre-season	(Scotland) Davie Irons	18 July 2007
Inverness	(Scotland) Charlie Christie	20 August 2007	Resigned	12th	(Scotland) Craig Brewster	27 August 2007
Hibernian	(Scotland) John Collins	20 December 2007	Resigned	5th	(Finland) Mixu Paatelainen	10 January 2008
Hearts	(Russia) Anatoliy Korobochka	1 January 2008	Sacked	10th	(Scotland) Stephen Frail (caretaker)	1 January 2008
Gretna	(Scotland) Davie Irons	19 February 2008	Signed by Greenock Morton	12th	(Scotland) Mick Wadsworth (caretaker)	19 February 2008

== Notable events ==
- 29 December: Thirty-five-year-old Motherwell captain Phil O'Donnell collapsed on the pitch at Fir Park during a match against Dundee United, and died later that evening.
- 29 March: Gretna were relegated after losing 2–0 to St Mirren at Love Street.
- 19 April: Hamilton Academical won promotion to the Scottish Premier League as First Division champions following a 2–0 over Clyde.
- 22 May: Celtic won their third successive SPL title after defeating Dundee United 1–0.
- 29 May: Gretna were demoted to the Third Division after administrator David Elliot could not guarantee the Football League that the club would fulfil its fixtures next season.
- 2 June: Gretna resigned from the Scottish Football League because the administrator concluded that the club could not continue to run as a business.

== League table ==
Pos	Team	Pld	W	D	L	GF	GA	GD	Pts	Qualification or relegation (Note: Teams played each other three times (33 matches), before the league split into two groups (the top six and the bottom six) for the last five matches.)
1	Celtic (C)	38	28	5	5	84	26	+58	89	Qualification for the Champions League group stage
2	Rangers	38	27	5	6	84	33	+51	86	Qualification for the Champions League second qualifying round
3	Motherwell	38	18	6	14	50	46	+4	60	Qualification for the UEFA Cup first round
4	Aberdeen	38	15	8	15	50	58	−8	53	
5	Dundee United	38	14	10	14	53	47	+6	52	
6	Hibernian	38	14	10	14	49	45	+4	52	Qualification for the Intertoto Cup second round (Note: Hibernian qualified for the Intertoto Cup as the highest ranked club to apply for a place in the competition.)
7	Falkirk	38	13	10	15	45	49	−4	49	
8	Heart of Midlothian	38	13	9	16	47	55	−8	48	
9	Inverness Caledonian Thistle	38	13	4	21	51	62	−11	43	
10	St Mirren	38	10	11	17	26	54	−28	41	
11	Kilmarnock	38	10	10	18	39	52	−13	40	
12	Gretna (R)	38	5	8	25	32	83	−51	13 (Note: Gretna were deducted 10 points for entering administration.)	Resigned from the Scottish Football League and liquidated (Note: At the end of the season, Gretna were relegated to the Third Division due to their financial struggles. However, as no buyer was found for the club, they resigned from the Scottish Football League and were subsequently liquidated.)

Source: Scottish Professional Football League
Rules for classification: 1) Points; 2) Goal difference; 3) Goals scored
(C) Champions; (R) Relegated

== Results ==
=== Matches 1–22 ===
During matches 1–22 each team played every other team twice (home and away).

Home \ Away	ABE	CEL	DUN	FAL	GRT	HOM	HIB	INV	KIL	MOT	RAN	STM
Aberdeen		1–3	2–0	1–1	2–0	1–1	3–1	1–0	2–1	1–2	1–1	4–0
Celtic	3–0		3–0	4–0	3–0	5–0	1–1	5–0	0–0	3–0	2–1	1–1
Dundee United	1–0	0–2		2–0	1–2	4–1	0–0	0–1	2–0	1–0	2–1	2–0
Falkirk	0–0	1–4	3–0		2–0	2–1	1–1	1–0	1–1	1–0	1–3	0–1
Gretna	1–1	1–2	3–2	0–4		1–1	0–1	0–4	1–2	1–2	1–2	0–0
Heart of Midlothian	4–1	1–1	1–3	4–2	1–1		0–1	2–3	1–1	1–2	4–2	0–1
Hibernian	3–3	3–2	2–2	1–1	4–2	1–1		1–0	4–1	1–0	1–2	0–1
Inverness Caledonian Thistle	1–2	3–2	0–3	4–2	3–0	2–1	2–0		3–1	0–3	0–3	1–0
Kilmarnock	0–1	1–2	2–1	0–1	3–3	3–1	2–1	2–2		0–1	1–2	0–0
Motherwell	3–0	1–4	5–3	0–3	3–0	0–2	2–1	2–1	1–2		1–1	1–1
Rangers	3–0	3–0	2–0	7–2	4–0	2–1	0–1	2–0	2–0	3–1		2–0
St Mirren	0–1	1–5	0–3	1–5	1–0	1–3	2–1	2–1	0–0	0–1	0–3	

Source: BBC Sport
Legend: Blue = home team win; Yellow = draw; Red = away team win.

=== Matches 23–33 ===
During matches 23–33 each team played every other team once (either at home or away).

Home \ Away	ABE	CEL	DUN	FAL	GRT	HOM	HIB	INV	KIL	MOT	RAN	STM
Aberdeen		1–5		2–1	3–0	0–1				1–1		1–1
Celtic			0–0			3–0		2–1	1–0	0–1		
Dundee United	3–0			0–0			1–1			2–0	3–3	1–1
Falkirk		0–1					0–2		0–0	0–0		4–0
Gretna		0–3	0–3	2–0				1–2	4–2	1–3		
Heart of Midlothian			1–0	0–0	2–0		1–0				0–4	
Hibernian	3–1	0–2			4–2			2–0	2–0			2–0
Inverness Caledonian Thistle	3–4		1–1	0–1		0–3					0–1	
Kilmarnock	3–1		1–2			0–0		4–1			0–2	1–0
Motherwell						0–1	1–0	3–1	1–0		1–1	
Rangers	3–1	1–0		2–0	4–2		2–1					4–0
St Mirren		0–1			2–0	1–1		1–1		3–1		

Source: BBC Sport
Legend: Blue = home team win; Yellow = draw; Red = away team win.

=== Matches 34–38 ===
During matches 34–38 each team played every other team in their half of the table once.

==== Top six ====
Home \ Away	ABE	CEL	DUN	HIB	MOT	RAN
Aberdeen			2–1	2–1		2–0
Celtic	1–0			2–0		3–2
Dundee United		0–1		1–1		
Hibernian					0–2	0–0
Motherwell	2–1	1–2	2–2			
Rangers			3–1		1–0	

Source: BBC Sport
Legend: Blue = home team win; Yellow = draw; Red = away team win.

==== Bottom six ====
Home \ Away	FAL	GRT	HOM	INV	KIL	STM
Falkirk		0–0	2–1	2–1		
Gretna			1–0			
Heart of Midlothian				1–0	0–2	3–2
Inverness Caledonian Thistle		6–1			3–0	0–0
Kilmarnock	2–1	1–1				
St Mirren	1–0	0–0			1–0	

Source: BBC Sport
Legend: Blue = home team win; Yellow = draw; Red = away team win.

== Goals ==
=== Top scorers ===
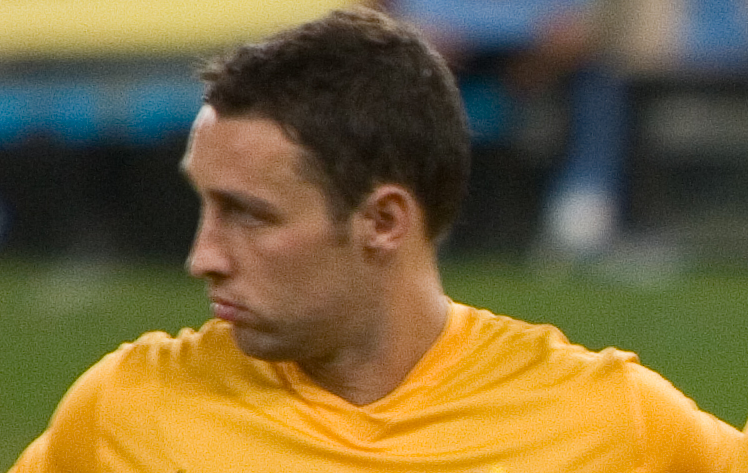
Celtic's Scott McDonald was the top goalscorer during season 2007–08.

Player	Goals	Club
(Australia) Scott McDonald	25	Celtic
(Netherlands) Jan Vennegoor of Hesselink	15	Celtic
(Scotland) Kris Boyd	14	Rangers
(England) Chris Porter	14	Motherwell
(Scotland) Steven Fletcher	13	Hibernian
(Republic of Ireland) Noel Hunt	13	Dundee United
(Scotland) Barry Robson	13	Dundee United/Celtic
(Scotland) David Clarkson	12	Motherwell
(French Guiana) Jean-Claude Darcheville	12	Rangers
(Scotland) Lee Miller	12	Aberdeen
(Scotland) Colin Nish	11	Kilmarnock/Hibernian
(Gabon) Daniel Cousin	10	Rangers
(Spain) Nacho Novo	10	Rangers
(Scotland) Don Cowie	9	Inverness CT
(England) Michael Higdon	8	Falkirk

=== Hat-tricks ===
Scorer	For	Against	Date
(Australia) Scott McDonald	Celtic	Dundee United	29 September 2007
(England) Clayton Donaldson	Hibernian	Kilmarnock	29 September 2007
(Australia) Scott McDonald	Celtic	Motherwell	27 October 2007
(Republic of Ireland) Aiden McGeady	Celtic	Falkirk	11 December 2007
(Scotland) Barry Robson	Dundee United	Heart of Midlothian	2 January 2008
(Scotland) Steven Fletcher	Hibernian	Gretna	13 February 2008

== Kits and shirt sponsors ==
Team	Kitmaker	Shirt sponsor	Notes
Aberdeen	Nike	Apex Tubulars	New home and third kits
Celtic	Nike	Carling	New home kit and new away kit to celebrate 40 years since being the first British team to win the European Cup.
Dundee United	hummel	Anglian Windows	New home and away kit
Falkirk	Lotto	Central Demolition	Lotto take over from previous manufacturer, TFG. Home kit is to celebrate the 50th anniversary of the club's Scottish Cup victory in 1957.
Gretna	Crest Teamwear	Subway	Subway take over as new sponsor
Heart of Midlothian	Umbro	Ukio Bankas	Umbro take over from previous manufacturer, Hummel
Hibernian	Le Coq Sportif	Whyte and Mackay	New away kit and new home kit
Inverness CT	Erreà	Flybe	Flybe take over as new sponsor
Kilmarnock	Lotto	www.smallworldmedia.com	Lotto take over from previous manufacturer, TFG.
Motherwell	Bukta	Anglian Home Improvements	Bukta take over from previous manufacturer, Xara
Rangers	Umbro	Carling	New home, away and third kits
St Mirren	hummel	Braehead Shopping Centre	Hummel take over from previous manufacturer, Xara

For the first time in the SPL, certain teams also carried secondary sponsors on the back of their jerseys, above the players' names.

== Attendances ==
Team	Stadium	Capacity	Lowest	Highest	Average
Celtic	Celtic Park	60,832	45,000	60,000	56,676
Rangers	Ibrox Stadium	51,082	47,419	50,440	48,090
Heart of Midlothian	Tynecastle Stadium	17,420	10,512	17,131	15,930
Hibernian	Easter Road	17,500	7,650	17,015	13,840
Aberdeen	Pittodrie	22,199	8,240	17,798	11,993
Dundee United	Tannadice Park	14,209	5,845	13,613	8,530
Kilmarnock	Rugby Park	18,128	4,456	11,544	6,181
Motherwell^{1}	Fir Park	13,742	4,086	10,445	6,598
Falkirk	Falkirk Stadium	6,935	4,490	6,803	5,657
Inverness CT	Caledonian Stadium	7,500	3,420	7,753	4,752
St Mirren	Love Street	10,800	3,163	7,840	4,547
Gretna^{1}	Fir Park	13,742	431	6,137	2,283

As of 22 May 2008

^{1} Gretna were sharing Motherwell's stadium whilst Raydale Park was being upgraded. However, in March the Fir Park pitch was considered unplayable so the game between Gretna and Celtic was played instead at Almondvale, the home of First Division club Livingston.

== Managerial changes ==
Team	Outgoing manager	Manner of departure	Date of vacancy	Replaced by	Date of appointment
Motherwell	(Scotland) Maurice Malpas	Sacked	18 June 2007	(Scotland) Mark McGhee	1 June 2007
Gretna	(Scotland) Andy Smith	Health	4 August 2007	(Scotland) Davie Irons	18 July 2007
Heart of Midlothian	(Lithuania) Valdas Ivanauskas	Mutual consent		(Scotland) Stephen Frail & (Russia) Anatoly Korobochka	30 July 2007
Inverness CT	(Scotland) Charlie Christie	Resigned	August 2007	(Scotland) Craig Brewster	27 August 2007
Hibernian	(Scotland) John Collins	Resigned	20 December 2007	(Finland) Mixu Paatelainen	10 January 2008
Gretna	(Scotland) Davie Irons	Resigned	19 February 2008	(England) Mick Wadsworth	19 February
Heart of Midlothian	(Scotland) Stephen Frail	Mutual Consent	27 May 2008	(Hungary) Csaba László	11 July

== Awards ==
=== Clydesdale Bank Premier League Monthly awards ===
Month	Manager	Player	Young player	Rising star
August	(Scotland) Walter Smith (Rangers)	(Spain) Carlos Cuéllar (Rangers)	(Scotland) Steven Fletcher (Hibernian)	(Scotland) Mark Staunton (Falkirk)
September	(Scotland) John Collins (Hibernian)	(Australia) Scott McDonald (Celtic)	(England) Andrew Driver (Heart of Midlothian)	(Scotland) Scott Anson (Kilmarnock)
October	(Scotland) Craig Levein (Dundee United)	(Scotland) Lee Wilkie (Dundee United)	(Scotland) Ross McCormack (Motherwell)	(Scotland) Jack Wilson (Hibernian)
November	(Scotland) Mark McGhee (Motherwell)	(Republic of Ireland) Aiden McGeady (Celtic)	(Scotland) Ross McCormack (Motherwell)	(Scotland) Liam Cusack (Gretna)
December	(Scotland) Craig Brewster (Inverness CT)	(Romania) Marius Niculae (Inverness CT)	(Scotland) Scott Arfield (Falkirk)	—
January	(Scotland) Walter Smith (Rangers)	(Scotland) Barry Robson (Dundee United)	(England) Danny Grainger (Dundee United)	—
February	(Finland) Mixu Paatelainen (Hibernian)	(Republic of Ireland) Aiden McGeady (Celtic)	(Scotland) Steven Fletcher (Hibernian)	(Scotland) Ryan Strachan (Aberdeen)
March	(Scotland) Walter Smith (Rangers)	(Scotland) Darren Barr (Falkirk)	(Scotland) Garry Kenneth (Dundee United)	(Scotland) Ryan Crighton (St Mirren)
April	(Scotland) Gordon Strachan (Celtic)	(Scotland) Barry Robson (Celtic)	(Scotland) Gary Glen (Heart of Midlothian)	—

=== Clydesdale Bank Premier League Awards ===
Award	Recipient
Player of the Season	(Spain) Carlos Cuéllar (Rangers)
Manager of the Season	(Scotland) Walter Smith (Rangers)
Young Player of the Season	(Republic of Ireland) Aiden McGeady (Celtic)
Goal of the Season	(Republic of Ireland) Willo Flood (Dundee United v St Mirren)
Under-19 League Player of the Season	(Scotland) Scott Anson (Kilmarnock)
Best Club Media Relations	Kilmarnock
Best Fan Initiative	Heart of Midlothian
Best Matchday Hospitality Package	Rangers
Best Community Initiative	Falkirk
Best Away Ground	Tynecastle (Heart of Midlothian)

PFA Scotland Team of the Year
Goalkeeper	(Poland) Artur Boruc (Celtic)			
Defenders	(Scotland) Steven Whittaker (Rangers)	(Spain) Carlos Cuéllar (Rangers)	(Scotland) Gary Caldwell (Celtic)	(Bosnia and Herzegovina) Saša Papac (Rangers)
Midfielders	(Scotland) Barry Ferguson (Rangers)	(Scotland) Barry Robson (Dundee United/Celtic)	(Scotland) Aiden McGeady (Celtic)	(Japan) Shunsuke Nakamura (Celtic)
Forwards	(Australia) Scott McDonald (Celtic)		(Netherlands) Jan Vennegoor of Hesselink (Celtic)	

== Broadcasting rights ==
Setanta Sports provided domestic TV live coverage and highlights as in previous seasons, with STV and BBC Scotland also broadcasting free-to-air highlights. BBC Radio Scotland continued to provide domestic radio coverage, with many games also available internationally, and all domestically, through their website. The BBC held rights to show highlights online and do so through the BBC Sport website. Internationally, the Premier League's overseas television broadcasting partner was TWI, with coverage of the SPL available in over 100 territories worldwide.Overseas Broadcasting | Scottish Premier League | Broadcasting | Overseas
