= Jim Griffin (footballer) =

Scottish footballer

Personal information
- Date of birth: 1 January 1967 (age 59)
- Place of birth: Hamilton, Scotland
- Position: Midfielder

Senior career*
Years	Team	Apps	(Gls)
1985–1994	Motherwell	92	(6)
- * Club domestic league appearances and goals

Jim Griffin (born 1 January 1967) is a Scottish former football midfielder who played for Motherwell in the late 1980s and early 1990s. Griffin played in Motherwell's 1991 Scottish Cup final-winning side.

== Honours ==
Motherwell

- Scottish Cup (1): 1991
