= 1991 Scottish Cup final =

1991 Scottish Cup Final
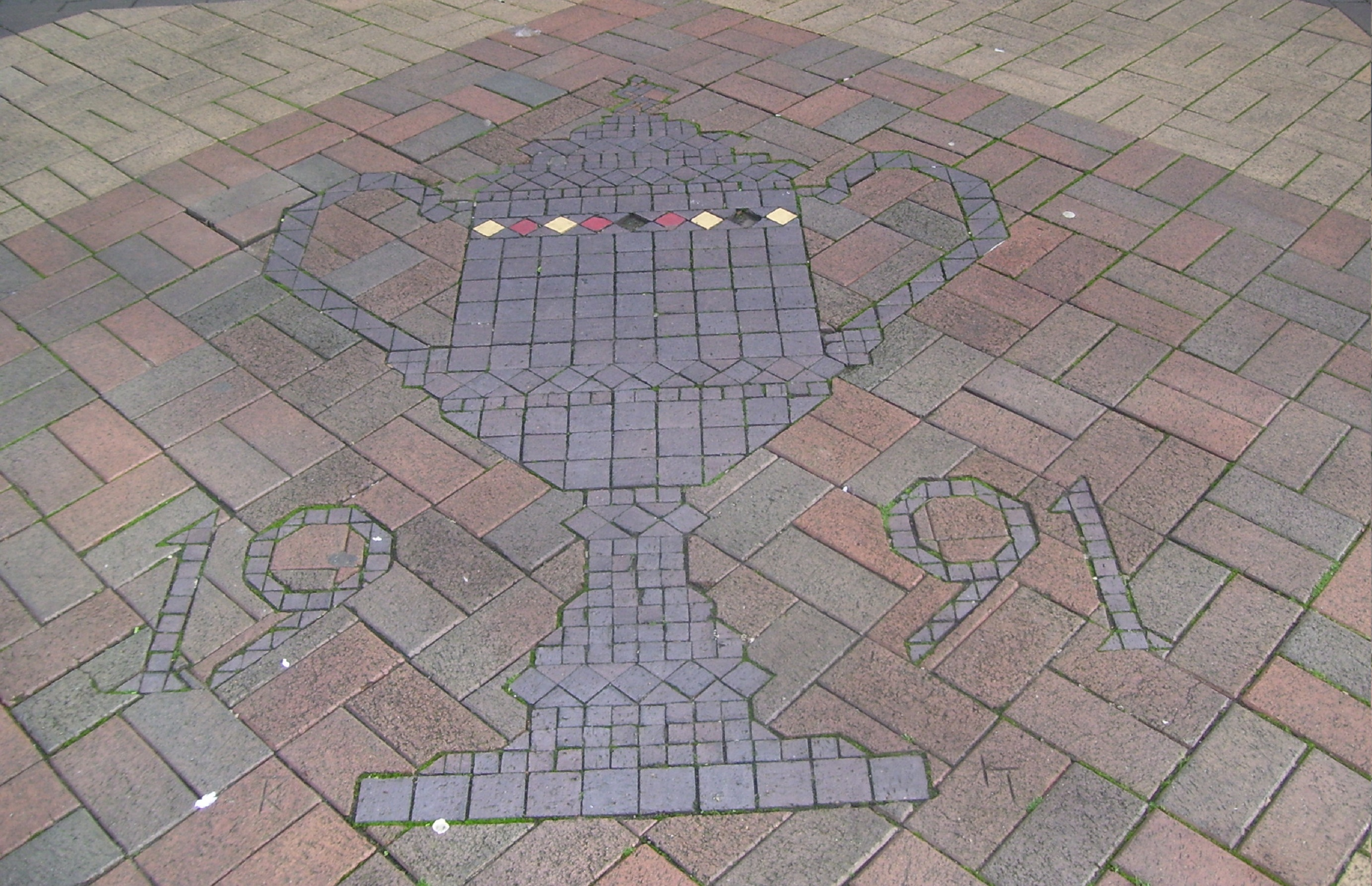
- A mosaic tribute to the cup victory within Motherwell Shopping Centre
- Event: 1990–91 Scottish Cup
Motherwell	Dundee United
4	3
- (after extra time)
- Date: 18 May 1991
- Venue: Hampden Park, Glasgow
- Man of the Match: Dave Bowman
- Referee: David Syme
- Attendance: 57,319

The 1991 Scottish Cup Final was the 106th final of the Scottish Cup, Scottish football's most prestigious knockout association football competition. The match took place at Hampden Park on 18 May 1991 and was contested by Scottish Premier Division clubs Motherwell and Dundee United. It was both Motherwell's and Dundee United's 6th Scottish Cup Final and also the first time the clubs had met in a Scottish Cup Final. The match was dubbed the "family final", as the manager of both clubs were brothers, Tommy McLean and Jim McLean.

As Scottish Premier Division clubs, Motherwell and United both entered the competition in the third round. Neither club won all four of their ties at the first attempt, Dundee United requiring a replay to knock out Division Two club East Fife in the third round. United went on to defeat Division One clubs Airdrieonians and archrivals Dundee before eliminating Tayside derby rivals St Johnstone in the semi-finals. After winning against defending champions Aberdeen in the third round, Motherwell defeated Division One clubs Falkirk and Greenock Morton then the previous seasons runners-up, Celtic, in a replayed semi-final.

The match was both clubs' 6th appearance in the final. However, it was Motherwell's first appearance in 39 years whilst Dundee United had reached the final only three seasons beforehand. Motherwell had previously won only one final whilst Dundee United had lost on all previous final appearances.

Motherwell won the match 4–3 after extra time was played. They took the lead when Iain Ferguson headed in just after 30 minutes had been played. In the second half, Dundee United equalized through Dave Bowman. Motherwell went back in front thanks to 18-year-old Phil O'Donnell and their lead was then extended to 3-1 by Ian Angus. However, two goals from United, one from John O'Neil and a last minute equaliser from Darren Jackson made the score 3–3, forcing the match into extra-time. Substitute Stevie Kirk scored a header in the first half of extra-time to conclude victory for Motherwell.

== Route to the final ==
Round	Opposition	Score
Third round	Aberdeen	1–0
Fourth round	Falkirk	4–2
Quarter-final	Greenock Morton	0–0
Quarter-final replay	Greenock Morton	1–1 (5–4 pens.)
Semi-final	Celtic	0–0
Semi-final replay	Celtic	4–2

=== Motherwell ===
As a Scottish Premier Division club, Motherwell entered the competition in the third round. They were drawn against fellow Premier Division club Aberdeen who were also defending champions having won the 1990 Scottish Cup Final. The match was played at Aberdeen's home of Pittodrie Stadium with Motherwell winning 1–0. The fourth round draw paired the club with Division One club Falkirk resulting in a 4–2 win at Fir Park to progress to the quarter-finals. Another Division One club in the form of Greenock Morton was the club's opponent, with the two clubs playing out a 0–0 draw to force a replay at Cappielow. The replay ended in another draw at 1–1 and the game progressed to a penalty shootout with Motherwell winning 5–4. In the semi-finals Motherwell faced the previous season's runners-up, Celtic, at Hampden Park with the game ending in another 0–0 draw for the club. A week later in the replay, Motherwell triumphed in a 4–2 victory to progress to the Scottish Cup Final for the first time in 39 years since defeating Dundee in the 1952 Final.

=== Dundee United ===
Round	Opposition	Score
Third round	East Fife	1–1
Third round replay	East Fife	2–1
Fourth round	Airdrieonians	2–0
Quarter-final	Dundee	3–1
Semi-final	St Johnstone	2–1

Dundee United, also a Premier Division club entered the competition in the third round. They were drawn against Division Two club East Fife who had progressed from the first round. The clubs played out a 1–1 draw at Bayview Park to force a replay at Tannadice Park. In the replayed match United emerged victorious in a 2–1 win. The fourth round draw saw Airdrieonians visit Tannadice, with the club losing 2–0. In the quarter-finals, United were drawn against archrivals Dundee to set up a Dundee derby match at home. United won the tie 3–1 to progress to the semi-finals where they faced other rivals St Johnstone from nearby Perth in a Tayside derby. Dundee United won the match 2–1 and booked a place in the final for the fifth time in the past ten years following appearances in the 1981, 1985, 1987 and 1988 finals.

== Match ==
=== Report ===
The match had been dubbed the "Family Final" by the media as the two opposing managers were brothers, Tommy McLean at Motherwell and Jim McLean at Dundee United.

Dundee United dominated the opening stages of the match, with Hamish French having the ball in the net after only two minutes but had his goal disallowed for off-side, whilst Freddy van der Hoorn on seven minutes hit the inside of the post from 25 yards out, only to see the ball roll out for a goal kick. Motherwell began to settle, however, before the game then went in to something of a lull. The opening goal came on 32 minutes when Motherwell's Iain Ferguson headed the ball into the top corner past Alan Main. Dundee United's Jim McInally came close to equalising with a shot near the end of the first half, but Motherwell held on to their lead for half-time.

Early in the second half, Motherwell goalkeeper Ally Maxwell was badly injured as a result of a challenge with United's John Clark. He was able to carry on after receiving treatment, but was in clear discomfort. Dundee United equalised on 55 minutes when Dave Bowman struck a 25-yard shot past the struggling Maxwell. Motherwell retook the lead a mere three minutes later when a Davie Cooper free-kick was flicked on by John Clark and headed past Alan Main by Phil O'Donnell. The Steelmen further extended their lead on 65 minutes when an Ian Angus shot from the edge of the penalty box flew into the top corner of the goal.

Despite now being 3–1 down, Dundee United rallied and quickly pulled a goal back; John O'Neil heading in a Dave Bowman cross from the right. It was O'Neil's first competitive goal for United. Dundee United laid siege to the Motherwell goal for the rest of the second half, but Motherwell looked like holding on until in the last minute Darren Jackson equalised. In the final moments of the second half, Maurice Malpas had a chance to win it for United, but his shot was off-target.

The final now went in to extra time. Four minutes in, Motherwell substitute Steve Kirk headed in at the back post to put Motherwell 4–3 ahead. Dundee United pushed on again in another effort to draw level, and near the end Maurice Malpas was denied a goal by a flying save from Maxwell. Shortly after that, John Clark shot past.

This time, however, Motherwell held on to full-time to win the cup, condemning Dundee United to their sixth Scottish Cup Final defeat in 17 years.

=== Details ===
18 May 1991
15:00BST

Motherwell	4 – 3	Dundee United
Ferguson 32'; O'Donnell 58'; Angus 65'; Kirk 94'	Report	Bowman 55'; O'Neil 67'; Jackson 90'

Hampden Park, Glasgow
Attendance: 57,319
Referee: David Syme

Motherwell	Dundee United

GK	1	(Scotland) Ally Maxwell
DF	2	(Netherlands) Luc Nijholt	(yellow card) 111'
DF	6	(Scotland) Chris McCart
DF	5	(Scotland) Craig Paterson
DF	3	(Scotland) Tom Boyd (c)
MF	8	(Scotland) Ian Angus
MF	4	(Scotland) Jim Griffin
MF	10	(Scotland) Phil O'Donnell
MF	11	(Scotland) Davie Cooper		(substituted off) 118'
FW	9	(Scotland) Iain Ferguson		(substituted off) 63'
FW	7	(Scotland) Dougie Arnott
Substitutes:
MF		(Northern Ireland) Colin O'Neill		(substituted on) 118'
FW		(Scotland) Stevie Kirk		(substituted on) 63'
Manager:
(Scotland) Tommy McLean

GK	1	(Scotland) Alan Main
DF	2	(Scotland) John Clark
DF	5	(Socialist Federal Republic of Yugoslavia) Miodrag Krivokapić
DF	7	(Netherlands) Fred van der Hoorn
DF	3	(Scotland) Maurice Malpas (c)
MF	6	(Scotland) Dave Bowman
MF	8	(Scotland) Ray McKinnon	(substituted off) 67'
MF	4	(Scotland) Jim McInally
FW	9	(Scotland) Hamish French
FW	10	(Scotland) Duncan Ferguson	(substituted off) 46'
FW	11	(Scotland) Darren Jackson
Substitutes:
MF		(Scotland) Billy McKinlay	(substituted on) 67'
MF		(Scotland) John O'Neil	(substituted on) 46'
Manager:
(Scotland) Jim McLean

Match officials

- Assistant referees:
- Fourth official:

Match rules

- 90 minutes.
- 30 minutes of extra-time if necessary.
- Penalty shoot-out if scores still level.
- Two named substitutes.
- Maximum of two substitutions.
