= Korobochka =

Korobochka may refer to:

- Anatoliy Korobochka, Soviet and Ukrainian footballer
- Nastasya Korobochka character in the novel Dead Souls by Nikolai Gogol
- Korobochka (music), ethnic Russian musical instrument
