= Colm O'Neill =

Colm O'Neill may refer to:

- Colm O'Neill (Midleton Gaelic footballer) (born 1964)
- Colm O'Neill (Ballyclough Gaelic footballer) (born 1988)

== See also ==
- Colin O'Neil
- Colin O'Neill
