= Ally Maxwell =

Scottish football player and coach (born 1965)

Personal information
- Full name: Alistair Espie Maxwell
- Date of birth: 16 February 1965 (age 61)
- Place of birth: Hamilton, Scotland
- Height: 1.78 m (5 ft 10 in)
- Position: Goalkeeper

Team information
- Current team: SC Del Sol Soccer Club (coach)

Youth career
- –1981: Fir Park B.C.
- 1981–1983: Motherwell

Senior career*
Years	Team	Apps	(Gls)
1983–1991	Motherwell	134	(0)
1987–1988	→ Clydebank (loan)	1	(0)
1992	→ Bolton Wanderers (loan)	3	(0)
1992–1995	Rangers	53	(0)
1995–1998	Dundee United	44	(0)
1998–2001	Greenock Morton	65	(0)
Total		300	(0)

International career
1994	Scotland B	1	(0)

Managerial career
- 2001: Greenock Morton
- * Club domestic league appearances and goals

Alistair Espie Maxwell (born 16 February 1965) is a Scottish football coach and former professional footballer. He is currently a youth coach for SC Del Sol Soccer Club in the United States, having previously played for Motherwell, Rangers and Dundee United, and coached Greenock Morton and US side Sereno Golden Eagles.

== Club career ==
Born in Hamilton, Maxwell started his career at Motherwell, spending the 1987–88 season on loan at Clydebank before becoming the first-choice goalkeeper at the Fir Park club at the start of the next campaign. He famously won the Scottish Cup in 1991, playing most of the second half plus thirty minutes of extra time with broken ribs, a ruptured spleen and intermittent double vision sustained in a collision with Dundee United defender John Clark. Despite his injuries, Maxwell stretched to tip a fierce goal-bound shot from Dundee United defender (and future Motherwell manager) Maurice Malpas over the bar with two minutes of extra time remaining, to ensure Motherwell ran out 4–3 winners. However, he did not play for the club during the next season due to a contract dispute with manager Tommy McLean, who brought in the experienced Billy Thomson and Dutchman Sieb Dijkstra to fill the position.

After a loan spell in England with Bolton Wanderers Maxwell moved to Rangers for a £300,000 fee, where he was initially backup to Andy Goram but played regularly when Goram was recovering from injury, picking up a Scottish League Cup winners' medal in 1993 followed by a Scottish Cup runners-up medal, as Dundee United gained revenge for Maxwell's heroics three years previously in the 1994 Scottish Cup final. He also played sufficient league games for medals in each of his three seasons at Ibrox which were part of the club's '9 in a row' run.

Maxwell then moved to Dundee United in 1995 for £250,000 and spent three seasons at Tannadice, although the majority of his games came in his first campaign, and having lost his place to Sieb Dijkstra again after injury, he did not play at all in the third. A move to Greenock Morton followed, where he played regularly for two seasons before becoming a coach and then manager at the club.

On 1 November 2019, it was announced that Maxwell was to be inducted into the Motherwell F.C. Hall of Fame.

== International career ==
Although present in several Scotland squads, Maxwell never received a cap. He did, however, play in the first half of a Scotland B international against Wales at Wrexham in 1994.

== Coaching career ==
Maxwell was briefly a goalkeeping coach at Hamilton Academical, after managing Morton for half a season in 2001.

A UEFA 'A' licensed professional coach, he now resides in the USA. He works as the goalkeeping coach at SC Del Sol in Arizona, where he has been since 2008.

== Honours ==
Motherwell

- Scottish Cup: 1990–91

Rangers

- Scottish League: 1992–93, 1993–94, 1994–95
- Scottish League Cup: 1993–94
