= Charles Aitken (disambiguation) =

Charles Aitken (1869–1936) was an English art administrator.

Charles or Charlie Aitken may also refer to:

- Charlie Aitken (footballer, born 1932) (1932–2008), Scottish footballer (Motherwell)
- Charlie Aitken (footballer, born 1942) (1942–2023), Scottish footballer (Aston Villa)
