= Colin O'Neill =

Northern Irish footballer

Personal information
- Date of birth: 14 June 1963 (age 63)
- Place of birth: Belfast, Northern Ireland
- Position: Midfielder

Senior career*
Years	Team	Apps	(Gls)
1979–1983	Ards		
1983–1984	Larne		
1984–1987	Ballymena United		
1987–1988	Portadown	21	(0)
1988–1992	Motherwell	64	(4)
1997–1998	Ards	9	(0)

International career
1986	Irish League XI	1	(0)
1989–1991	Northern Ireland	3	(0)
- * Club domestic league appearances and goals

Colin O'Neill (born 14 June 1963) is a Northern Irish former footballer who played for Ards, Larne, Ballymena, Portadown and Motherwell, as a midfielder.

O'Neill played in Motherwell's 1991 Scottish Cup Final winning side.

== Honours ==
Motherwell

- Scottish Cup: 1991
