= 1927 Copa del Rey (unofficial) =

Copa del Oro

Tournament details
- Country: Spain
- Teams: 3

Final positions
- Champions: (Scotland) Motherwell
- Runners-up: (Spain) Real Madrid

Tournament statistics
- Matches played: 2
- Goals scored: 11 (5.5 per match)

The 1927 unofficial Copa del Rey was a one-off friendly international football tournament held in Madrid in May 1927, and which was contested by Real Madrid, Motherwell, and Swansea City. It was organized by the RFEF as a post-season unofficial edition of the Copa del Rey, and it was won by Motherwell, who defeated Madrid 3–1 in the final at Estadio Chamartín. The Scottish team thus won the so-called Copa del Oro ("Gold Cup"), a special version of the Copa del Rey trophy that was specially made to reward the winning team of this tournament, and which was donated by King Alfonso XIII.

More important than the results, however, was its historical significance, as it was the first time that two British teams played against each other on Spanish soil and Motherwell became only the third Scottish club to defeat Madrid in the 1920s. Furthermore, Motherwell is sometimes wrongly labeled as the only foreign club to have ever won a Copa del Rey.

== Summary ==
Since 1903, the Copa del Rey has been contested by the winners and runners-up of each of the several regional championships in Spain, including the ('Centro' (Madrid area), Catalonia, North (Biscay), and the South (Andalusia) championships, but this system came to an end when the current league format was finally adopted in the late 1920s. Therefore, the Royal Spanish Football Federation (RFEF) decided to organize one last edition in the post-season either as some sort of send-off or to celebrate the transition.

To achieve this, RFEF invited John Hunter's Motherwell, the runner-ups of the 1926–27 Scottish Football League, as well as Swansea City. Both accepted the invitation and traveled to Madrid to face each other in a match whose winner would then meet Madrid to contest the so-called Copa del Oro, a special version of the Copa del Rey trophy that Alfonso XIII, the King of Spain, had donated. In what was the very first match between two British teams on Spanish soil, Motherwell won by a score of 4–3; King Alfonso XIII described this match as a "brilliant display of scientific football".

In order to improve their chances of winning, the Real Madrid team was reinforced by some players from other Spanish clubs, not to mention that Motherwell only rested two days, but the Scots were able to overcome all of these obstacles, including Madrid's home ground advantage, and won the final of the 1927 unofficial Copa del Rey. The match was held at Estadio Chamartín on 17 May, and Motherwell won 3–1. In doing so, Motherwell became only the second Scottish club to defeat Madrid in the 1920s, the other being Dundee in 1923, although only the former returned home with silverware, official or otherwise.

The final was refereed by Albert Prince-Cox, who had recently officiated an international match between Spain and Hungary in Vigo.

== Match details ==
17 May 1927
17:15 CET

Real Madrid (Spain)	1–3	(Scotland) Motherwell
Hutchinson 85' (o.g.)	Report	Stevenson 7', 20'; Hutchinson 47'

Estadio Chamartín, Madrid
Attendance: 10,000
Referee: Albert Prince-Cox (England)

Madrid	Motherwell

GK	1	(Spain) Jesús
DF	2	(Spain) Patricio Escobal
DF	3	(Spain) José María Benguria
MF	4	(Spain) Joaquín
MF	5	(Spain) Lope Peña
MF	6	(Spain) José María Peña
FW	7	(Spain) José María Muñagorri (Mejía)
FW	8	(Spain) Manuel Valderrama
FW	9	(Spain) Juan Monjardín
FW	10	(Spain) Félix Pérez
FW	11	(Spain) Gerónimo del Campo

GK	1	(Scotland) Allan McClory
DF	2	(Scotland) Johnnan
DF	3	(Scotland) Bryers
MF	4	(Scotland) Craig I
MF	5	(Scotland) Craig II
MF	6	(Scotland) Thackeray I
FW	7	(Scotland) McMurtrie
FW	8	(Scotland) Hutchinson
FW	9	(Scotland) Thackeray II
FW	10	(Scotland) Stevenson
FW	11	(Scotland) Ferris

== Aftermatch ==
Both Motherwell and Swansea took advantage of RFEF's invitation to turn it into a tour in Spain, which generated much local interest, with the former making a very successful tour, winning six out of the eight games they played and losing only one. In addition to this emphatic victory over Madrid, Motherwell's tour also included a trip to the Catalan capital, where after a 2–2 draw with Barcelona, and another win over Swansea, they were presented with a second trophy, the Copa Barcelona. Their only loss came on 29 May at the hands of Athletic Bilbao, which had been reinforced by four players from Arenas Club de Getxo, who had all played in the official 1927 Copa del Rey final two weeks earlier.

Even though neither trophy is listed in the official history books, Motherwell still exhibits both in their museum.

== Bibliography ==
- Wilson, Derek (2009). Motherwell FC Miscellany. Pitch Publishing. ISBN 978-1-905411-37-5.

== See also ==
- 1927 Copa del Rey
