= Hugh Sproat =

Scottish footballer

Personal information
- Date of birth: 16 November 1952 (age 73)
- Place of birth: Ayr, Scotland
- Position: Goalkeeper

Youth career
- Auchinleck Talbot

Senior career*
Years	Team	Apps	(Gls)
1974–1979	Ayr United	128	(0)
1979–1984	Motherwell	145	(0)
1984–1986	Ayr United	61	(0)
Total		334	(0)
- * Club domestic league appearances and goals

Hugh Sproat (born 16 November 1952) is a Scottish footballer, who played as a goalkeeper.

Sproat joined Ayr United from Auchinleck Talbot in 1974. He became a fans favourite and was voted the club's all-time cult hero by Football Focus viewers in 2005. He moved onto Motherwell in 1979 before returning to Ayr in 1984 before retiring from the game in 1986, aged 34.
