= Joe Wark =

Scottish footballer

Personal information
- Date of birth: 9 October 1947
- Place of birth: Glasgow, Scotland
- Date of death: 1 October 2015 (aged 67)
- Height: 1.75 m (5 ft 9 in)
- Position: Left back

Youth career
- Irvine Victoria

Senior career*
Years	Team	Apps	(Gls)
1968–1984	Motherwell	464	(14)

International career
1976	Scottish Football League XI	1	(0)
- * Club domestic league appearances and goals

Joe Wark (9 October 1947 – 1 October 2015) was a Scottish professional footballer who spent his entire professional career with Motherwell, making 464 appearances in the Scottish Football League.

In later life, Wark was diagnosed with dementia and took part in the Remember Well project, run by North Lanarkshire Council, Motherwell FC, NHS Lanarkshire and Alzheimer's Scotland. Wark died on 1 October 2015.

On 23 September 2021, it was announced that Wark was to be inducted into the Motherwell F.C. Hall of Fame.
