= Joe Mackin =

Scottish footballer (died ??)

Personal information
- Position: Goalkeeper

Senior career*
| Years | Team | Apps | (Gls) |
- Muirkirk Juniors
- Kettering Town
| 1954–1958 | Dunfermline Athletic | 98 | (0) |
| 1958–1959 | Ayr United | 9 | (0) |
| 1959–1960 | Motherwell | 20 | (0) |
- Carlisle United
| Total | | 127 | (0) |
- * Club domestic league appearances and goals

Joe Mackin was a Scottish professional footballer who played as a goalkeeper for Muirkirk Juniors, Kettering Town, Dunfermline Athletic, Ayr United, Motherwell and Carlisle United.
