= John Martis =

Scottish footballer

Personal information
- Date of birth: 30 March 1940 (age 86)
- Place of birth: Motherwell, Scotland
- Height: 1.80 m (5 ft 11 in)
- Position: Centre half

Youth career
- Royal Albert

Senior career*
Years	Team	Apps	(Gls)
1957–1969	Motherwell	296	(2)
1969	Hellenic	2	(0)
1969–1975	East Fife	200	(0)
Total		498	(2)

International career
1960	Scotland	1	(0)
- * Club domestic league appearances and goals

John Martis (born 30 March 1940) is a Scottish former professional footballer who made nearly 500 appearances in the Scottish Football League and was capped once for the Scotland national side.

== Playing career ==
Martis signed for Motherwell in 1957 from local Junior side Royal Albert and became known as one of the "Ancell Babes" under the tutelage of then manager Bobby Ancell, alongside players such as Pat Quinn and Ian St. John. A solid and uncompromising centre half, he remained at Fir Park for twelve seasons before departing for a brief spell in South Africa with Hellenic FC. On his return to Scotland, he joined East Fife, for whom he played for six years before retiring in 1975.

A youth international, he won his only full cap for Scotland against Wales in a British Home Championship fixture in 1960.

On 2 November 2021, it was announced that Martis was to be inducted into the Motherwell F.C. Hall of Fame.
