= Stephen Frail =

Scottish footballer (born 1969)

Personal information
- Full name: Stephen Charles Frail
- Date of birth: 10 August 1969 (age 57)
- Place of birth: Glasgow, Scotland
- Positions: Right-back; midfielder

Youth career
- Possilpark YM

Senior career*
| Years | Team | Apps | (Gls) |
| 1985–1994 | Dundee | 99 | (1) |
| 1994–1998 | Heart of Midlothian | 54 | (4) |
| 1998–2000 | Tranmere Rovers | 14 | (0) |
| 2000–2001 | St Johnstone | 15 | (0) |
| 2001–2002 | Greenock Morton | 24 | (0) |
| Total | | 206 | (5) |

Managerial career
- 2001–2002: Greenock Morton (player-coach)
- 2002–2004: Greenock Morton (assistant)
- 2004–2007: Heart of Midlothian (assistant)
- 2007–2008: Heart of Midlothian (co-caretaker)
- 2008: Heart of Midlothian (caretaker)
- 2009–2015: Celtic U20
- 2016–2020: Northern Ireland U-19s
- 2020–2021: Dundee United (assistant)
- 2023–2025: Motherwell (assistant)
- 2025: Motherwell (interim)
- * Club domestic league appearances and goals

Stephen Charles Frail (born 10 August 1969) is a Scottish football coach and former player. He played for Dundee, Heart of Midlothian, Tranmere Rovers, St Johnstone and Greenock Morton. Returning to Hearts as a coach, he was in charge of the first team between 2007 and 2008, partially alongside Anatoliy Korobochka.

== Playing career ==
Frail began his career with Archie Knox's Dundee in 1985, gradually developing into a first-team player by the end of the decade. He helped the Dens Park side to victory in the inaugural Scottish Challenge Cup in 1990–91, however his progress was hindered by a serious knee ligament injury, causing him to miss almost an entire season.

Frail joined Hearts in a £130,000 deal in March 1994 and his form during the 1994–95 season as a right wingback led to media speculation of a call-up to the Scotland national side. He was named in the SPFA Team of the Year for 1994. Injuries continued to hinder him though and in an away match at Dundee United on 21 March 1995 he suffered similar knee ligament damage to that he sustained while with Dundee. He missed the entire 1995–96 season and upon his return to fitness found his previous role in the team taken by Gary Locke. Unable to maintain a permanent position in the team he filled-in as a defensive midfielder when required as well as deputising for Locke but left Edinburgh for Merseyside when Tranmere Rovers paid £90,000 for his services in January 1998.

Following a familiar pattern, Frail's time with Tranmere was decimated by injuries and he made less than 30 total appearances during his two seasons with the club. He is best remembered for his involvement in a controversial incident in an FA Cup tie with Sunderland, when a bureaucratic mix-up resulted in him being substituted on for Clint Hill who, unbeknown to Frail, had just been sent-off for a second bookable offence. After several minutes of commotion another player left the field to ensure Tranmere didn't avoid their punishment.

Frail returned to Scotland with St Johnstone in 2000, signed for a second time by his former Hearts manager Sandy Clark. After a single season in Perth he moved to Greenock side Morton.

== Coaching career ==
While at Morton, Frail began to become involved in coaching, firstly under Peter Cormack then former teammate at Hearts Dave McPherson. He retired from his playing role at the end of the 2001–02 season and became a full-time assistant to Morton's third manager within the year, John McCormack. McCormack was sacked in 2004, and Frail and the rest of the coaching staff left with him. Later that year, after attending Hearts UEFA Cup tie with Sporting Braga, he was invited to join their coaching staff by then manager Craig Levein. Initially coach of the under-19 side, he was promoted to become assistant coach when John McGlynn left to manage Raith Rovers in 2006.

Frail, along with sporting director Anatoly Korobochka, took temporary charge of Hearts' first team in March 2007 after the departure of Valdas Ivanauskas. It was confirmed in June 2007 that Frail and Korobochka would take charge of the Jambos for the 2007–08 season with Bulgarian Angel Chervenkov coming in as assistant, though it was left ambiguous which one of the pair had responsibility for team selection. After poor form, which saw Hearts drop to tenth in the SPL, Frail was promoted to caretaker manager in January 2008 as the club planned to appoint a new permanent manager. It was announced Frail will be replaced as manager at the end of the 2007/08 season.

In April 2009, Frail was appointed a coach at Celtic, working with their reserve and youth teams. He left this position on 1 September 2015.

After leaving Celtic, Frail worked with the Scotland U16 team and scouted for Bolton Wanderers before the Irish Football Association appointed him to be full-time manager of the Northern Ireland Under 19 and Under 17 teams in August 2016. Frail returned to Scotland in July 2020, becoming assistant manager at Dundee United.

In June 2021, Frail left Dundee United.
