= Stuart Rennie =

Scottish footballer

Stuart Rennie (born 24 April 1947) is a Scottish former footballer who played as a goalkeeper. Rennie is best known for his time at Motherwell from 1973 and 1979 where he made 174 appearances and also had spells with Falkirk and Ayr United.
