= Motherwell F.C. =

Association football club in Motherwell, Scotland

Motherwell
- Full name: Motherwell Football Club
- Nicknames: The Well; The Steelmen
- Founded: 17 May 1886; 140 years ago
- Ground: Fir Park
- Capacity: 13,677
- Coordinates: 55°46′49″N 3°58′49″W
- Chairman: Kyrk Macmillan
- Manager: Alfred Johansson
- League: Scottish Premiership
- 2025–26: Scottish Premiership, 4th of 12
- Website: www.motherwellfc.co.uk
Home colours	Away colours

Motherwell Football Club is a Scottish professional football club based in Motherwell, North Lanarkshire, which plays in the Scottish Premiership. Motherwell have not dropped out of the top flight of Scottish football since 1985, and have lifted one trophy in that time – the Scottish Cup in 1991.

Owing to the town's history of steel production, the club is nicknamed "the Steelmen"; or "the Well" for short. Clad in their traditional claret and amber, Motherwell play their home matches at Fir Park and have done so since 1896. The club's main rivals over the years have been Hamilton Academical and Airdrieonians, due in part to their close geographical proximities. These matches are known as the Lanarkshire derby.

The club have won four major trophies in domestic football: the Scottish League title in 1931–32, the Scottish Cup in 1951–52 and 1990–91, and the Scottish League Cup in 1950–51.

Sports Illustrated has suggested Motherwell's fans as the originators of the "Viking Thunder Clap", a supporting chant eventually popularised by the fans of the Iceland national football team, where fans stay silent and let out loud synchronised claps seconds apart, gradually speeding up; the chant received wider international attention during Euro 2016.

== History ==
=== Beginnings ===
Motherwell was born on 17 May 1886, when representatives of the two main Motherwell works teams Glencairn FC and Alpha F.C. met in Baillie's pub in the town's Merry Street, and decided to merge the two teams with the aim of creating a club to represent the town as a whole at a higher footballing level. Motherwell's debut fixture proved to be a successful one as they overcame Hamilton Academical 3–2.

Yearly table positions of Motherwell in the League.

The early years proved somewhat chaotic as the club had little regular competition to play in, and matches would often start with players short, as men failed to turn up on time after their shifts in the local ironworks. On 5 August 1893, the decision was made to turn professional, and the club was consequently elected to the league, then being the only Lanarkshire side to compete at national level.

Up until 1895, the club had played at a few different venues, including a site at Roman Road, and Dalziel Park. The small pitch and muddy conditions at Dalziel Park were deemed unsuitable and Lord Hamilton granted a lease on a plot of land on his Dalzell estate. This new ground was named Fir Park and has remained the club's home for over 120 years.

The following years saw the club grow, appointing their first and longest serving manager to date, John 'Sailor' Hunter, who would go on to steer the club into its most successful period.

In 1913, the decision was made to change the club's colours from blue to the now signature claret and amber. It is thought this was inspired by the success of Bradford City, who also sport claret and amber, although a more romantic version of events claims them to have been Lord Hamilton of Dalzell's racing colours.

=== 1920s and 1930s successes ===
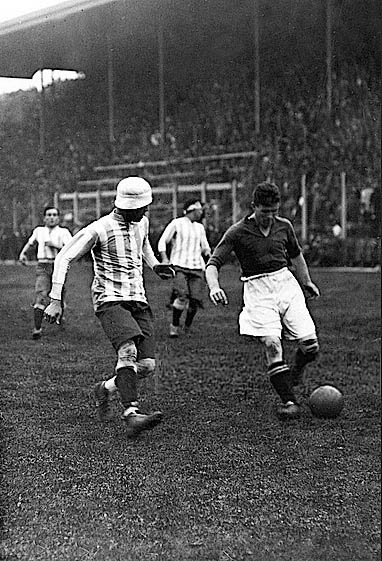
Motherwell playing Argentina national team at Boca Juniors stadium, 1928

Motherwell enjoyed a successful period in the aftermath of World War I, managed by John Hunter. The club placed third in the 1919–20 season and, although narrowly avoiding relegation in 1924–25, they steadily climbed the table and enjoyed seven successive seasons finishing in the top three.

In the summer of 1927, the club made a very successful tour of Spain, winning six out of the eight games they played and losing only one. These results included an emphatic 3–1 victory over Real Madrid and a 2–2 draw with Barcelona. Following their success in Spain, the club went on another summer tour, this time of South America. After losing only three of their previous ten games, the tour culminated in a 5–0 defeat by a Brazilian League Select side.

Motherwell's first (and to this day, only) Scottish League championship came in 1931–32 – with 30 wins in 38 fixtures, scoring 119 goals – a record 52 of which were scored by Willie MacFadyen, who remains to this day the record holder for most goals scored in a single season and one of the club's all-time top goalscorers with 251 goals. The championship was sealed on 23 April 1932, when Rangers could only draw at home against Clyde, handing Motherwell the title without kicking a ball. Between 1904 and 1947, this was also the only League title won by a club outside the Old Firm. In the two seasons following the league title win (1933–34 and 1934–35), 'Well finished runners-up, as they had also been in 1926–27 and 1929–30. They also contested three Scottish Cup finals in this period – in 1931, 1933 and 1939, but lost them all.

=== Post-World War II period ===
Following the break-up of the squad after World War II, the club were not instantly successful. It then captured two major trophies in as many years with victories in the 1950 Scottish League Cup final and the 1952 Scottish Cup Final. The club was then relegated for the first time ever at the end of the 1952–53 season, but the club were promoted the next year.

Following their return to the First Division, Bobby Ancell took management of the club in 1955 and presided over an era in which highly regarded Scotland stars including Ian St John and Charlie Aitken played for the club. However, Motherwell were unable to keep their assets, and no trophies were won in Ancell's era. His resignation came in 1965 amidst a downturn in form which eventually saw the club relegated back to the Second Division at the conclusion of the 1967–68 season.

=== 1970s recovery and the McLean era ===
Motherwell were immediately promoted back to the First Division in 1969, maintaining a mid-table position. The 18-team First Division was superseded by a new 10-team Premier League for the 1975–76 season, at which time they were managed by Willie McLean and his assistant Craig Brown (who would become manager almost 35 years later). Under their management, Motherwell improved to fourth in the table with players such as Bobby Graham, Willie Pettigrew and Bobby Watson. The most notable cup run of that period was the 1975–76 Scottish Cup where they eliminated Celtic and lost out in the semi-final to Rangers.

=== 1980 and 90s ===
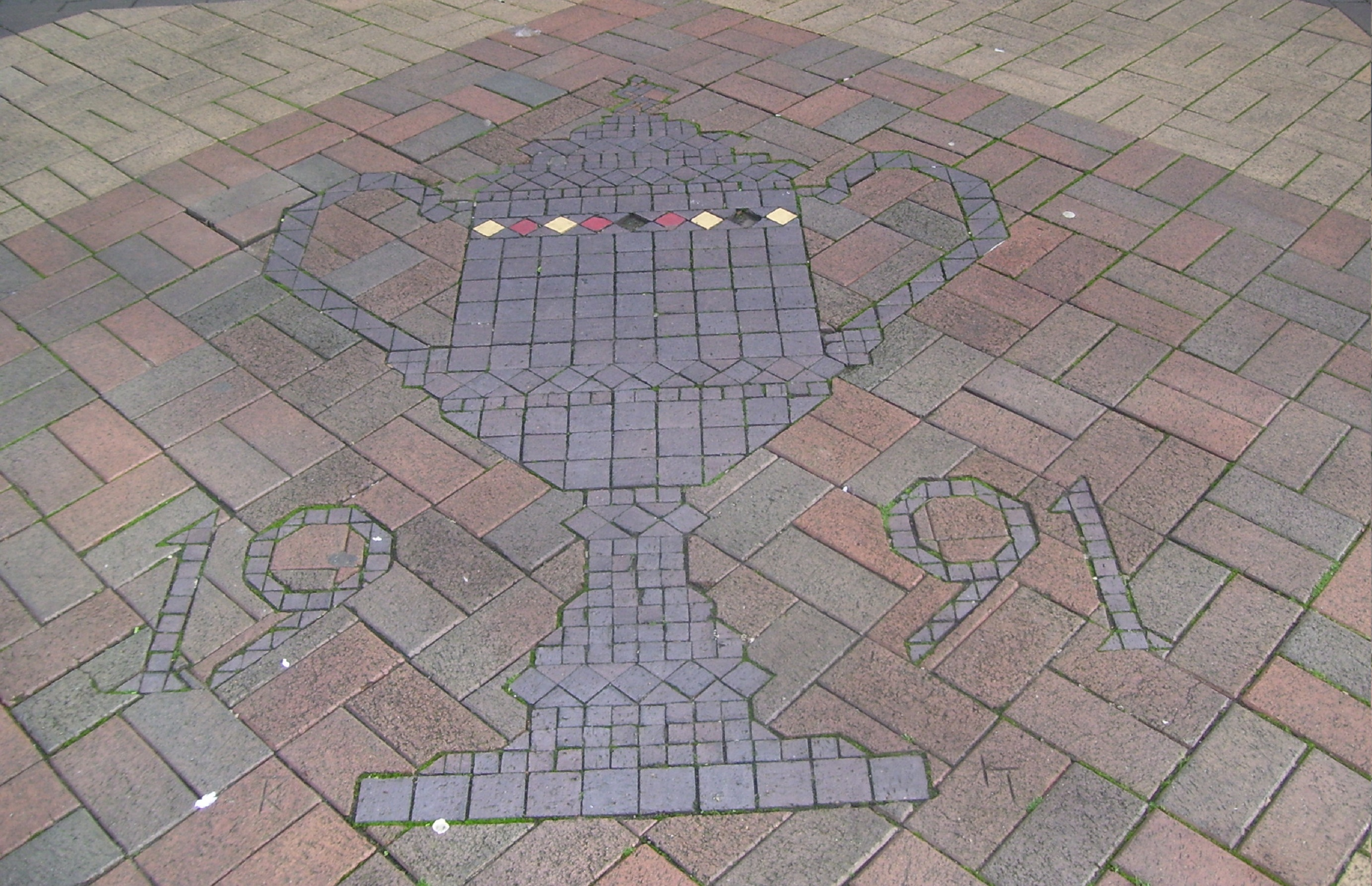
Tribute to Motherwell's 1991 Scottish Cup winning side

Relegation down to the now-First Division and promotion back to the Premier League occurred twice in the early 1980s, before a decade under manager Tommy McLean (brother of Willie) culminated in a Scottish Cup win in 1991. However, similarly to the Ancell era, Scotland internationalist Tom Boyd was sold in the close season after the cup win. Results faded for two years before reaching another two season zenith immediately following the signing of Paul Lambert with third (1993–94) and second-placed (1994–95) Premier League finishes. The 1995 runners-up finish was the club's highest finish since 1933–34.

With Tommy McLean's departure to Hearts in 1994, much of his squad was broken up; a large fee in particular was paid by Celtic for Phil O'Donnell. Much of this money was reinvested in the squad, while the club cycled through managers including Alex McLeish and Harri Kampman. At this point, in August 1998, John Boyle bought the club, taking over from John Chapman. Billy Davies was appointed as manager, and large transfer fees were paid for prominent players including ex-Scotland internationals John Spencer and Andy Goram. The investment though failed to provide results on the pitch.

=== 2000–2009 ===
By the end of Davies' tenure the club were in financial trouble. Eric Black was briefly in charge with the club floating near the foot of the table before it was placed in administration in April 2002 with losses approaching GBP 2 million yearly. Black resigned, and was replaced by Terry Butcher. The club's outlook remained bleak as they were forced to make redundant or release 19 players and replace them with younger players; Boyle also placed the club up for sale. Relegation in 2002–03 – normally automatic following a last-place finish in the league – was avoided on a technicality, as First Division winners Falkirk lacked a stadium meeting Premier League regulations.

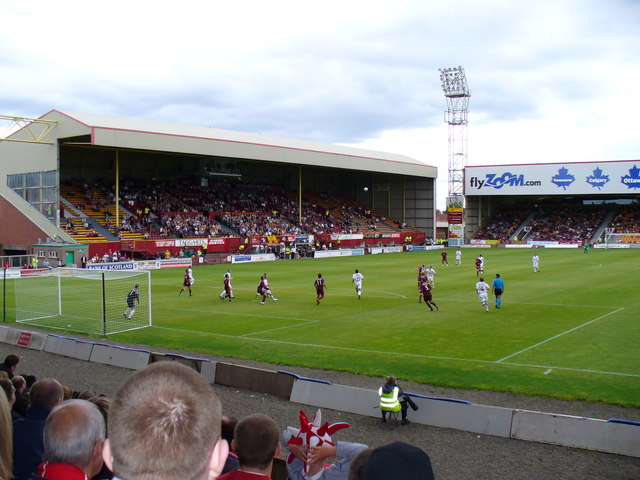
Fir Park, home of Motherwell

Despite the lack of resources, a number of young talented players were found to play for the club; crucially, when many of these moved on, including Stephen Pearson and James McFadden, they brought revenue in the form of transfer fees, and with John Boyle waiving the club's personal debt to him, its financial future was assured by the conclusion of the 2004–05 season with the club's yearly losses falling to one of the lowest figures in the Premier League and the club coming out of administration in time to avoid a ten-point Premier League penalty which was being phased in for teams in administration. On the field, the club also managed to reach the League Cup final, although they were comprehensively defeated by Rangers. Butcher moved on to Sydney FC at the end of the 2005–06 season, and was succeeded by his assistant Maurice Malpas. Malpas' stint at the club lasted just one season before his resignation in May 2007. After a short period with Scott Leitch as caretaker manager, Mark McGhee was appointed to the position. In his first season as manager, McGhee would take the club to third in the league, and thus qualify for the UEFA Cup for the first time in 13 years, where they would be beaten by French side Nancy 3–0 on aggregate. Mark McGhee left Motherwell for the vacant managerial position at Aberdeen in June 2009, and was replaced by Jim Gannon. Former Scotland manager Craig Brown took over when Gannon left.

=== 2010–present ===
Brown helped the club finish fifth in the SPL and qualify for Europe. The 2010–11 season saw the club in the Europa League and they defeated Breiðablik and Aalesunds before losing in the Play-off round to Odense preventing them from reaching the group stages of the competition. Brown left Motherwell for Aberdeen on 10 December 2010. Stuart McCall was named as his successor. This season saw the club reach the Scottish Cup Final where they were defeated 3–0 by Celtic.

The 2011–12 season saw Motherwell reach the qualifying round of the Champions League for the first time. They finished third, one place outside the normal two spots allocated to the SPL for the Champions League. However the club was awarded a place because the club that had finished above them, Rangers, went into administration and were prevented by UEFA from playing in European competitions. In the draw for the third qualification round of the Champions League, Motherwell were drawn against Greek heavyweights Panathanaikos. This ended in disappointment, as Motherwell were knocked out after losing 2–0 at home and then 3–0 away. The 2012–13 season brought even greater success in the SPL as the club finished second in the table and once again qualified for the Europa League. It also saw striker Michael Higdon win the PFA Scotland Players' Player of the Year award. Goalkeeper Darren Randolph (second year running), defender Shaun Hutchinson and midfielder Nicky Law were selected for the PFA Scotland Team of the Year.

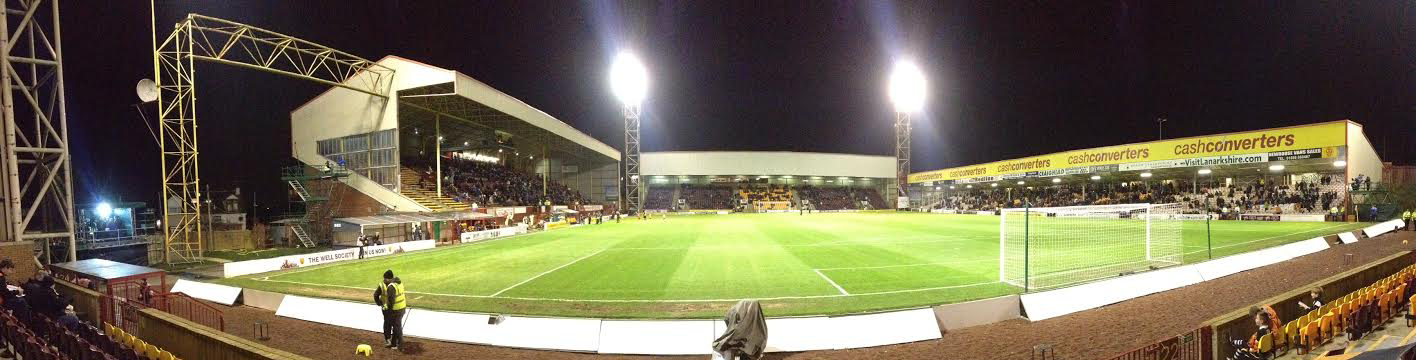
A panoramic view of Fir Park, pictured during a Scottish Premiership fixture between Motherwell and Dundee United.

Motherwell were granted associate membership of the European Club Association in June 2013, becoming the fifth Scottish club to join the Association. The club were invited to join after consistent qualification for European competition between 2008 and 2013. In the 2013–14 season, Motherwell were knocked out of the Europa League by Russian side Kuban Krasnodar 3–0 on aggregate in the third qualifying round. On 22 January 2014, Motherwell won their 40th Lanarkshire cup beating Hamilton Academical 1–0, thanks to a 54th-minute goal by 19-year-old youngster Jack Leitch. On the final day of the 2013–14 Scottish Premiership, Motherwell won 1–0 at Aberdeen with a dramatic 93rd-minute winner, leapfrogging Aberdeen in the process to seal a second successive runners-up spot in the league. Despite conceding the most goals (60) out of the top six teams, European football was delivered for the sixth time in seven seasons, with a record points total (70). It was a season that also saw a first ever competitive defeat to Lanarkshire neighbours Albion Rovers, sitting third bottom of Scottish League Two at the time, 1–0 in the Scottish Cup.

Despite three successful consecutive league campaigns, Motherwell made a poor start to the 2014–15 Scottish Premiership, which ultimately led to the resignation of manager Stuart McCall on 2 November 2014. Despite the appointment of Ian Baraclough in December 2014, Motherwell were eventually consigned to a Scottish Premiership relegation play-off spot after a defeat at St Mirren in the penultimate league match of the 2014–15 season. In the 2014–15 relegation play-off finals, Motherwell faced Rangers. The first leg, at Rangers' home ground, Ibrox, saw Motherwell run out as winners with a score of 1–3. In the second leg, Motherwell celebrated staying in the top division by winning, 3–0. On 23 September 2015, Motherwell parted ways with manager Ian Baraclough. Mark McGhee returned in October 2015 before being sacked in March 2017 after a poor run of results.

On 28 October 2016, Motherwell became a fan-owned club when supporters club Well Society's £1 deal with Les Hutchison was concluded. On 13 October 2017, Manager Stephen Robinson extended his contract until May 2020. On 31 December 2020, Robinson resigned as manager, with Keith Lasley taking interim charge. In June 2025 Jens Berthel Askou was appointed manager.

In Popular Culture and Literature

In the crime novel The Greenock Murders by Kieran James (2021), a ten-year-old autistic boy, Wee Robbie, moves from Motherwell to Greenock with his family. He refuses to give up his support of Motherwell despite repeated abuse and bullying. In the closing stages of the novel, Motherwell defeat Rangers 2–1 in a fictional 2022 Scottish Cup Final, involving real players' names on both sides.

== Records and statistics ==
The club has won four major trophies in its history: the First Division in 1931–32, the Scottish Cup in 1952 and 1991, and the Scottish League Cup in 1950. In addition, it has won the second-tier Scottish league on four occasions; as the Second Division in 1953–54 and 1968–69, and as the First Division (beneath the Premier League) in 1981–82 and 1984–85. They also won the Milk Cup in 1983, and the Scottish Summer Cup in 1944 and 1965.

Bob Ferrier holds the record for the number of Motherwell appearances, with 626 in the inter-war period. The goalscoring record is held by Hughie Ferguson, who scored 284 league goals in 10 seasons in the 1910s and 1920s. Willie MacFadyen's 52 goals in the title-winning 1931–32 season remains a club (and country) record for goals in one season.

The club's record European appearance holder is Steven Hammell, with 19 appearances for the club in Europe. The current record European goalscorer is Jamie Murphy, with seven goals. Also, the 8–1 win over Flamurtari on 23 July 2009 currently stands as their record victory in European competition.

Fir Park's current safety certificate limits the capacity to 13,742, all-seated in accordance with the Taylor Report, although the ground is listed as 13,677. Its average home gate for the 2018–19 season was 5,448. The club's record attendance for a home match is 35,632, against Rangers in a Scottish Cup quarter-final replay on 12 March 1952, but as season ticket holders were not counted at the time, the true attendance would be over 37,000.

Motherwell's biggest win was a 12–1 victory over Dundee United in 1954, with the club's heaviest defeat being the 8–0 loss to Aberdeen in 1979.

On 5 May 2010, Motherwell were involved in the highest scoring match in the SPL, drawing 6–6 with Hibernian at Fir Park, with Lukas Jutkiewicz scoring the equaliser in the 91st minute. This eclipsed another high-scoring game involving Motherwell, a 6–5 defeat by Aberdeen on 20 October 1999. The record transfer fee paid by the club was to Everton for John Spencer in 1999 (£500,000) and the highest received was for Elijah Just for his move to Swansea City in 2026 (£6m), eclipsing the previous record for Lennon Miller to Udinese the previous year. The clubs first million pound transfer was the £1.75m paid for previous record holder Phil O'Donnell in 1994 by Celtic. O'Donnell rejoined Motherwell in 2004, but his second spell at Fir Park ended when he died after collapsing on the pitch in a game against Dundee United on 29 December 2007.

Stephen Craigan holds the record for the most-capped player at the club, with 54 caps in total, 51 as a Motherwell player – Northern Ireland.

=== Europe ===
As of match played 27 August 2026

Competition	P	W	D	L	GF	GA	GD
European Cup / Champions League	2	0	0	2	0	5	−5
UEFA Cup Winners' Cup	2	1	0	1	3	3	0
UEFA Cup / Europa League	29	9	3	17	40	40	0
Europa Conference League	8	3	1	4	10	11	-1
Total	41	13	4	24	53	59	–6

=== Player of the Year ===
The Supporters Association first handed out the award in April 1956. The first winner of the award was Andy Paton, who received a silver cup from Sailor Hunter at a dinner dance in Overton Miners Welfare. Paton was further honoured in 2007 when he was declared the "Greatest Ever" Motherwell player.

Joe Wark and Keith Lasley are the only men to win the award three separate times. Charlie Aitken was the first of five players to win the award back-to-back, with Louis Moult being the last player to do this.

- 1955–56 – (Scotland) Andy Paton
- 1956–57 – (Scotland) Charlie Aitken
- 1957–58 – (Scotland) Charlie Aitken
- 1958–59 – (Scotland) Ian St John
- 1959–60 – (Scotland) Joe Mackin
- 1960–61 – (Scotland) Pat Quinn
- 1961–62 – (Scotland) Bobby Roberts
- 1962–63 – (Scotland) Bobby McCallum
- 1963–64 – (Scotland) Joe McBride
- 1964–65 – (Scotland) Pat Delaney
- 1965–66 – (Scotland) John Martis
- 1966–67 – (Scotland) John Martis
- 1967–68 – (Scotland) Peter McCloy
- 1968–69 – (Scotland) Joe Wark
- 1969–70 – (Scotland) Keith MacRae
- 1970–71 – (Scotland) Bobby Watson
- 1971–72 – (Scotland) Willie McCallum
- 1972–73 – (Scotland) Joe Wark
- 1973–74 – (Scotland) Bobby Graham
- 1974–75 – (Scotland) Bobby Watson
- 1975–76 – (Scotland) Joe Wark
- 1976–77 – (Scotland) Stuart Rennie
- 1977–78 – (Scotland) Gregor Stevens
- 1978–79 – (Scotland) Stuart Rennie
- 1979–80 – (Scotland) Hugh Sproat
- 1980–81 – (Scotland) Joe Carson
- 1981–82 – (Scotland) Steve McLelland
- 1982–83 – (Scotland) Ally Mauchlen
- 1983–84 – (Scotland) Andy Dornan
- 1984–85 – (Scotland) Graeme Forbes
- 1985–86 – (Scotland) Tom Boyd
- 1986–87 – (Scotland) Fraser Wishart
- 1987–88 – (Scotland) Craig Paterson
- 1988–89 – (Scotland) Steve Kirk
- 1989–90 – (Scotland) Tom Boyd
- 1990–91 – (Scotland) Ally Maxwell
- 1991–92 – (Scotland) Phil O'Donnell
- 1992–93 – (Netherlands) Sieb Dijkstra
- 1993–94 – (Scotland) Brian Martin
- 1994–95 – (Scotland) Brian Martin
- 1995–96 – (Scotland) Paul Lambert
- 1996–97 – (Netherlands) Mitchell van der Gaag
- 1997–98 – (Republic of Ireland) Tommy Coyne
- 1998–99 – (England) Ged Brannan
- 1999–00 – (England) Don Goodman
- 2000–01 – (Scotland) Steven Hammell
- 2001–02 – (France) Éric Deloumeaux
- 2002–03 – (Scotland) Martyn Corrigan
- 2003–04 – (Northern Ireland) Stephen Craigan
- 2004–05 – (Australia) Scott McDonald
- 2005–06 – (Scotland) Graeme Smith
- 2006–07 – (Scotland) Mark Reynolds
- 2007–08 – (Scotland) David Clarkson
- 2008–09 – (Northern Ireland) Stephen Craigan
- 2009–10 – (England) John Ruddy
- 2010–11 – (Scotland) Keith Lasley
- 2011–12 – (Scotland) Keith Lasley
- 2012–13 – (England) Michael Higdon
- 2013–14 – (Scotland) Keith Lasley
- 2014–15 – (Scotland) Lee Erwin
- 2015–16 – (England) Louis Moult
- 2016–17 – (England) Louis Moult
- 2017–18 – (Northern Ireland) Trevor Carson
- 2018–19 – (Scotland) David Turnbull
- 2019–20 – (Scotland) Declan Gallagher
- 2020–21 – (Scotland) Tony Watt
- 2021–22 – (Scotland) Liam Kelly
- 2022–23 – (Netherlands) Kevin van Veen
- 2023–24 – (Canada) Theo Bair
- 2024–25 – (Scotland) Lennon Miller
- 2025–26 – (New Zealand) Elijah Just

=== Hall of Fame ===
The club launched its official Hall of Fame in 2019, with five inaugural members announced at a dinner on 23 November. Four of the names were confirmed prior to the event with a fifth, a special fans vote, announced on the night as Phil O’Donnell. The 2020 event was postponed due to the COVID-19 pandemic, with only three names, Hunter, Paton and Cooper having been confirmed. On 9 September 2021, the club announced the event was returning with the two remaining 2020 inductees to be named alongside the previous three, together with a whole new class of five names for 2021.

2019:

- (Scotland) George Stevenson
- (Scotland) Willie Pettigrew
- (Scotland) Ally Maxwell
- (Scotland) Phil O’Donnell
- (Scotland) James McFadden

2020:

- (Scotland) John 'Sailor' Hunter
- (Scotland) Andy Paton
- (Scotland) Joe Wark
- (Scotland) Davie Cooper
- (Scotland) Steven Hammell

2021:

- (England) Bobby Ferrier
- (Scotland) John Martis
- (Scotland) Tommy McLean
- (Scotland) Steve Kirk
- (Northern Ireland) Stephen Craigan

2022:

- (Scotland) Willie MacFadyen
- (Scotland) Willie Hunter
- (Scotland) Bobby Graham
- (Republic of Ireland) Tommy Coyne
- (Scotland) Keith Lasley

2023:

- (Scotland) Hughie Ferguson
- (Scotland) Martyn Corrigan
- (Scotland) Bobby Ancell
- (Scotland) Charlie Aitken
- (Scotland) John Philliben

=== Managers ===
Name	Tenure	Scottish League	Scottish Cup	Scottish League Cup	Promotion from Second Tier	Total
John "Sailor" Hunter	1911–1946	1	0	0	0	1
George Stevenson	1946–1955	0	1	1	1	3
Bobby Ancell	1955–1965	0	0	0	0	0
Bobby Howitt	1965–1973	0	0	0	1	1
Ian St John	1973–1974	0	0	0	0	0
Willie McLean	1974–1977	0	0	0	0	0
Roger Hynd	1977–1978	0	0	0	0	0
Ally MacLeod	1978–1981	0	0	0	0	0
David Hay	1981–1982	0	0	0	1	1
Jock Wallace	1982–1983	0	0	0	0	0
Bobby Watson	1983–1984	0	0	0	0	0
Tommy McLean	1984–1994	0	1	0	1	2
Alex McLeish	1994–1998	0	0	0	0	0
Harri Kampman	1998	0	0	0	0	0
Billy Davies	1998–2001	0	0	0	0	0
Eric Black	2001–2002	0	0	0	0	0
Terry Butcher	2002–2006	0	0	0	0	0
Maurice Malpas	2006–2007	0	0	0	0	0
Mark McGhee	2007–2009	0	0	0	0	0
Jim Gannon	2009	0	0	0	0	0
Craig Brown	2009–2010	0	0	0	0	0
Stuart McCall	2011–2014	0	0	0	0	0
Ian Baraclough	2014–2015	0	0	0	0	0
Mark McGhee	2015–2017	0	0	0	0	0
Stephen Robinson	2017–2020	0	0	0	0	0
Graham Alexander	2021–2022	0	0	0	0	0
Steven Hammell	2022–2023	0	0	0	0	0
Stuart Kettlewell	2023–2025	0	0	0	0	0
Michael Wimmer	2025	0	0	0	0	0
Jens Berthel Askou	2025–2026	0	0	0	0	0

== Honours ==
Motherwell have won a number of league titles and cups in their history, which includes four major domestic trophy successes. Their sole Scottish league championship came in season 1931–32 (finishing with 66 points in total, a winning margin of 5 points). Their biggest cup success was winning the Scottish Cup twice in 1951–52 (4–0 v Dundee) and 1990–91 (4–3 v Dundee United), and the Scottish League Cup once in 1950–51 (3–0 v Hibernian). Motherwell also won the now defunct Summer Cup in 1943–44 and 1964–65.

They have also won the second tier of Scottish league football on four occasions. Other notable cup success includes winning the Scottish Qualifying Cup once and winning the Lanarkshire Cup forty times, most recently in its last edition played in 2014. Their most recent cup final appearances came in the 2017–18 Scottish Cup and the 2017–18 Scottish League Cup, losing both to Celtic 2–0. Their best league performance recently in the Scottish top flight was registering back-to-back second-place finishes in 2012–13 and 2013–14. They have qualified for European competition ten times.

In the summer of 1927, Motherwell won an invitational 'Copa del Rey' trophy in Madrid as part of their tour of Spain, beating fellow tourists Swansea Town 4–3 in the semi-final and hosts Real Madrid 3–1 in the final.

Below is a list of honours won and other achievements by Motherwell.

Honour		Year(s)	Ref(s)
Scottish League Championship (currently known as Scottish Premiership)	Champions	1931–32	
Scottish League Championship (currently known as Scottish Premiership)	Runners-up	1926–27, 1929–30, 1932–33, 1933–34, 1994–95, 2012–13, 2013–14	
Scottish League Championship (currently known as Scottish Premiership)	Third-place	1919–20, 1927–28, 1928–29, 1930–31, 1958–59, 1993–94, 2007–08, 2011–12, 2019–20	
Scottish League First Division	Champions	1953–54, 1968–69, 1981–82, 1984–85	
Scottish League First Division	Runners-up	1894–95, 1902–03	
Scottish Federation (Note: The Scottish Football Federation was a short-lived non-league that Motherwell competed in from 1891 to 1893 before being elected into the Scottish Football League Second Division in 1893–94.)	Runners-up	1892–93	
Scottish Cup	Winners	1951–52, 1990–91	
Scottish Cup	Finalists	1930–31, 1932–33, 1938–39, 1950–51, 2010–11, 2017–18	
Scottish League Cup	Winners	1950–51	
Scottish League Cup	Finalists	1954–55, 2004–05, 2017–18	
Summer Cup (Note: The Summer Cup in the 1940s was a regional competition for Southern League teams, while in the 1960s it was a national cup competition for Scottish Football League clubs.)	Winners	1943–44, 1964–65	
Lord Provost Charity Cup (Note: The Lord Provost of Glasgow Charity Cup was a Scottish Super Cup match between the 1951–52 Division One champions and 1951–52 Scottish Cup winners.)	Winners	1952–53	
Scottish Qualifying Cup	Winners	1902–03	
Scottish Qualifying Cup	Finalists	1896–97, 1901–02	
Southern League Cup	Finalists	1944–45	
Lanarkshire League	Champions	1898–99	
Lanarkshire League	Runners-up	1900–01	
West of Scotland League	Champions	1902–03	
Lanarkshire Cup (Note: The Lanarkshire Cup Final was between Motherwell and Airdrieonians in 1925–26, but the cup was withheld after a dispute over choice of venue.)	Winners	1894–95, 1898–99, 1900–01, 1906–07, 1907–08, 1911–12, 1926–27, 1927–28, 1928–29, 1929–30, 1931–32, 1932–33, 1936–37, 1939–40, 1949–50, 1951–52, 1952–53, 1953–54, 1954–55, 1955–56, 1956–57, 1957–58, 1958–59, 1959–60, 1960–61, 1961–62, 1963–64, 1968–69, 1972–73, 1976–77, 1980–81, 1982–83, 1984–85, 1988–89, 1989–90, 1990–91, 2009–10, 2010–11, 2012–13, 2013–14	
Lanarkshire Cup	Finalists	1887–88, 1893–94, 1895–96, 1897–98, 1914–15, 1922–23, 1925–26, 1950–51, 1960–61, 1962–63, 1969–70, 1970–71, 1974–75, 1992–93	
Lanarkshire Charity Cup	Winners	1917–18	
Lanarkshire Express Cup	Winners	1914–15, 1920–21, 1923–24, 1925–26	
Lanarkshire Consolation Cup	Winners	1892–93	
Lanarkshire Consolation Cup	Finalists	1889–90	
Airdrie Charity Cup	Winners	1892–93	
Wishaw Charity Cup	Winners	1913–14, 1914–15	
Rosebery Charity Cup	Runners-up	1932–33	
Express Ibrox Disaster Fund	Winners	1901–02	
Franco-Scottish Friendship Cup (Note: The Franco-Scottish Friendship Cup was an Inter-League competition.)	Co-Winners	1960–61	
Franco-Scottish Friendship Cup	Co-Runners-up	1961–62	
Airdrieonians Tournament	Winners	1887	
Copa del Rey	Winners	1927	
Copa Barcelona	Winners	1927	
Isle of Man Tournament	Winners	1989	
Sir Matt Busby Shield	Winners	2009	
Five / Six-a-Side Competitions
Tennents' Sixes	Runners-up	1987–88, 1988–89, 1990–91	
Lanarkshire Police Sports	Winners	1920	
Lanarkshire Police Sports	Runner-up	1925	
City of Glasgow Police Sports	Winners	1924	
Motherwell FC Sports	Winners	1920, 1922, 1924, 1925	
Falkirk Pro Sports	Winners	1925	
Lochwinnoch Sports	Winners	1926	
Lochwinnoch Sports	Runners up	1924	
Ayr Professional	Winners	1921	

== Current squad ==
As of 18 September 2026

=== First-team squad ===
Note: Flags indicate national team as defined under FIFA eligibility rules; some limited exceptions apply. Players may hold more than one non-FIFA nationality.

No.	Pos.	Nation	Player
1	GK	NZL	Alex Paulsen (on loan from Bournemouth)
2	DF	SCO	Stephen O'Donnell
3	DF	AUS	Jake Girdwood-Reich
4	DF	CAN	Jamie Knight-Lebel (on loan from Bristol City)
5	DF	AUT	Martin Moormann
6	DF	SCO	Jordan McGhee
7	MF	WAL	Tom Sparrow
8	MF	AUT	Lukas Fadinger
11	MF	SCO	Alex Lowry (on loan from Wycombe Wanderers)
12	MF	AUS	Oscar Priestman
13	FW	SWE	Jardell Kanga
14	FW	SCO	Callum Hendry
15	FW	NOR	Eythor Bjørgolfsson

No.	Pos.	Nation	Player
16	DF	SCO	Paul McGinn (captain)
17	FW	GRN	Regan Charles-Cook
18	FW	ZIM	Tawanda Maswanhise
19	FW	NGR	Ibrahim Said
20	DF	ENG	Dylan Williams
21	GK	SCO	Matthew Connelly
22	DF	AUS	John Koutroumbis
23	DF	SCO	Ewan Wilson
45	DF	ENG	Emmanuel Longelo
47	FW	ENG	Seb Palmer-Houlden
63	MF	WAL	Dylan Levitt
71	MF	IRL	Joe Hodge
77	FW	SUI	Willy Vogt

==== Out on loan ====
Note: Flags indicate national team as defined under FIFA eligibility rules; some limited exceptions apply. Players may hold more than one non-FIFA nationality.

No.	Pos.	Nation	Player
24	FW	SCO	Luca Ross (on loan at Alloa Athletic)
25	MF	SCO	Olly Whyte (on loan at Ayr United)
29	MF	SCO	Zander McAllister (co-operation loan with The Spartans)

No.	Pos.	Nation	Player
34	DF	SCO	Aaron Thomson (co-operation loan with The Spartans)
36	FW	SCO	Lucas Weir (co-operation loan with Cowdenbeath)

=== Development team ===
As of 18 September 2026

Note: Flags indicate national team as defined under FIFA eligibility rules; some limited exceptions apply. Players may hold more than one non-FIFA nationality.

No.	Pos.	Nation	Player
26	DF	SCO	Jon-Joe Friel
27	MF	SCO	Mikey Booth
28	MF	SCO	Aaron Buchanan
30	DF	SCO	Jack Dalziel
31	GK	SCO	Jack McConnell
32	FW	SCO	Robbie Hunter
33	DF	SCO	Aiden Tearney
35	MF	SCO	Blane Watson

No.	Pos.	Nation	Player
37	FW	SCO	Jude Henderson
38	FW	SCO	Joshua Clarkson
39	FW	SCO	Leo Lee
40	DF	SCO	Scott McCrimmon
41	GK	SCO	Lewis McGahey
42	DF	SCO	Kai McFarlane
43	DF	ENG	Samuel Ngandu
44	DF	SCO	Matthew Pettigrew

=== Retired numbers ===
Note: Flags indicate national team as defined under FIFA eligibility rules; some limited exceptions apply. Players may hold more than one non-FIFA nationality.

No.	Pos.	Nation	Player
10	MF	SCO	Phil O'Donnell (posthumous honour)

Since O'Donnell's death in 2007, only one player has worn the number 10 shirt. David Clarkson, who is the nephew of O'Donnell, wore the shirt up until he left the club in July 2009. While not officially retired, it has not been issued to any subsequent player.

== Club staff ==
=== Board of directors ===
Position	Name
Majority shareholder	The Well Society
Chief executive	Brian Caldwell
Chairman	Kyrk Macmillan
Director	Greg Anderson
Director	Grant Jarvie
Director	David Macfarlane
Finance director	David Lindsay

=== Coaching staff ===
Position	Name
Manager	Alfred Johansson
Assistant manager	Max Rogers
First team coach	Jonathan Obika
Goalkeeping coach	Neil Alexander
Head of football	Nick Daws
First team scout & data analyst	Andy Watson
Academy director	David Clarkson
Head of academy coaching	Jim Paterson
Head of performance analysis	Ciaran King
Performance analyst	Greg Spires
Club doctor	Barry McLachlan
Physiotherapist	Jack Pow
Head of sports science	Graeme Henderson
Sports scientist	Kirk Phillips
Kit coordinator	Alan MacDonald

== Sponsorship ==
Motherwell were sponsored in the 2019–20 season by online gambling company Paddy Power as part of their 'Save our Shirt' campaign'. This followed Bet Park sponsoring the side in a deal running since the start of the 2018–19 season. Commsworld was the principal sponsor from the 2010–11 season. Due to the sponsorship deal not being agreed in time for the start of the 2010–11 UEFA Europa League the team briefly featured www.chooselife.net as their main shirt sponsor. They have also been sponsored by the local IT firm Log in to Learn, which appeared on the back of the shirts. For the 2009–10 season the team were sponsored by JAXX, a German gambling company. They in turn had replaced Anglian Home Improvements, who were the club's shirt sponsor from 2006 to 2008. Previous to this the club had been sponsored by Zoom Airlines, who were part-owned by club director John Boyle, and who retained advertising space on both the Davie Cooper Stand and the South Stand until they ceased trading in August 2008.

The sponsor from 2002 to 2004 was a local company called The Untouchables. Previously the club had enjoyed a long-term association with Motorola, but this ended after 11 years in 2002 as the sponsor started to reduce its manufacturing operations in Scotland. This had in turn followed another long-term association with local car dealer Ian Skelly, who had sponsored the club since 1984.

The club have had a number of different kit manufacturers since the 1970s. At present the official kit supplier is Macron who were newly announced for the 2014–15 season to replace Puma after their 3-year deal with the club expired. Previously the club kits were supplied by New-Zealand based sporting goods manufacturer Canterbury who were announced as the official kit supplier to Motherwell for the four years beginning with the 2009–10 season, taking over from Bukta. However, Canterbury went into administration after less than one year of the contract had been completed. Major manufacturers Adidas, Admiral, Hummel, Patrick, Pony, Umbro and Xara have all been kit providers for Motherwell.

=== Kit and main sponsors ===
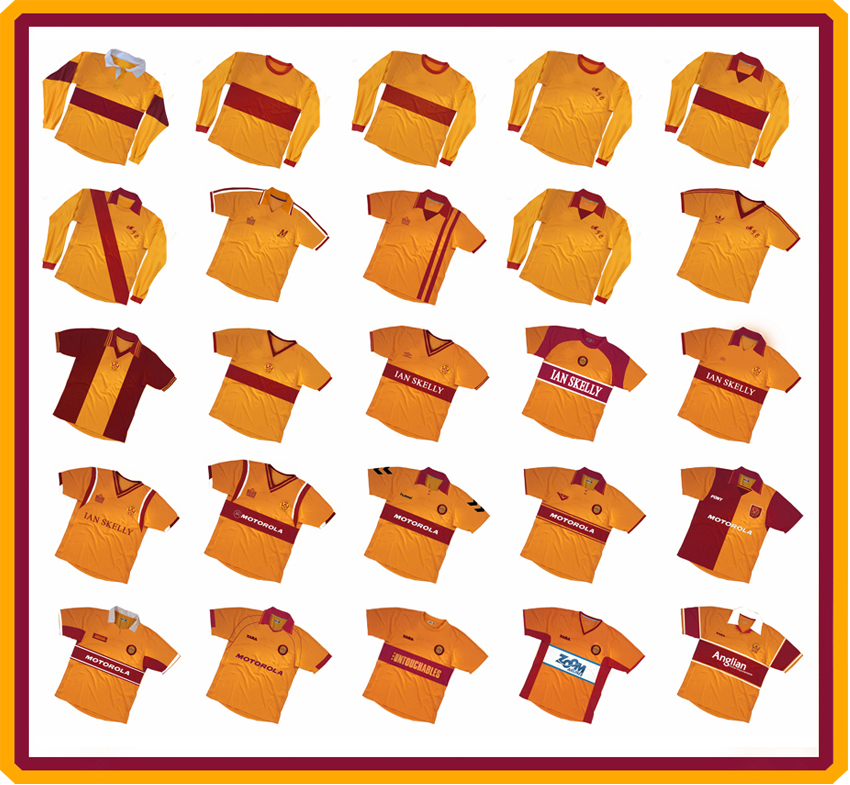
A montage of Motherwell F.C. kits from 1935 to 2006

Period	Kit Manufacturer	Shirt sponsor (front)	Shirt sponsor (sleeve)
1974–1976	Umbro	None	None
1976–1979	Admiral	None	None
1979–1982	Adidas	None	None
1982–1983	Patrick	Scottish Brewers	None
1983–1984	Patrick	None	None
1984–1985	Patrick	Ian Skelly	None
1985–1987	Admiral	Ian Skelly	None
1987–1990	Matchwinner	Ian Skelly	None
1990–1991	Admiral	Ian Skelly	None
1991–1992	Admiral	Motorola	None
1992–1994	Hummel	Motorola	None
1994–1998	Pony	Motorola	None
1998–2002	Xara	Motorola	None
2002–2004	Xara	The Untouchables	None
2004–2006	Xara	Zoom Airlines	None
2006–2007	Xara	Anglian Home Improvements	None
2007–2008	Bukta	Anglian Home Improvements	None
2008–2009	Bukta	JAXX	None
2009–2010	Canterbury	JAXX	None
2010–2011	Puma	Commsworld	None
2011–2014	Puma	Cash Converters	None
2014–2016	Macron	Cash Converters	None
2016–2017	Macron	Motorpoint	None
2017–2018	Macron	McEwan Fraser Legal	None
2018–2019	Macron	Bet Park	None
2019–2020	Macron	Paddy Power	None
2020–2023	Macron	Paycare	None
2023–2024	Macron	G4 Claims	None
2024–2026	Macron	G4 Claims	DX Home Improvements
2026	Macron	G4 Claims	K Electrical Wholesale
2026–	Macron	Lime	K Electrical Wholesale
