= Charlie Aitken (footballer, born 1932) =

Scottish footballer (1932–2008)

Personal information
- Date of birth: 19 July 1932
- Place of birth: Gorebridge, Scotland
- Date of death: 12 January 2008 (aged 75)
- Height: 1.73 m (5 ft 8 in)
- Position: Wing half

Senior career*
Years	Team	Apps	(Gls)
1950–1966	Motherwell	314	(38)

International career
1957	Scotland B	1	(0)
1958	Scottish Football League XI	2	(0)
- * Club domestic league appearances and goals

Charlie Aitken (19 July 1932 – 12 January 2008) was a Scottish professional football player who spent his entire career with Motherwell, making 314 appearances in the Scottish Football League between 1950 and 1966.

He was voted Motherwell Player of the Year twice.

Aitken died on 12 January 2008, at the age of 75.
