= 1990–91 Scottish Cup =

Tournament details
- Country: Scotland

Final positions
- Champions: Motherwell
- Runners-up: Dundee United

The 1990–91 Scottish Cup was the 106th staging of Scotland's most prestigious football knockout competition. The Cup was won by Motherwell who defeated Dundee United F.C. in the final.

== First round ==
Home team	Score	Away team
Threave Rovers (NL)	1 – 2	Spartans (NL)
Whitehill Welfare (NL)	0 – 4	East Fife (3)
Montrose (3)	0 – 0	Dumbarton (3)
East Stirlingshire (3)	1 – 3	Queen of the South (3)
Fraserburgh (NL)	3 – 1	Vale of Leithen (NL)
Ross County (NL)	1 – 1	Alloa Athletic (3)

=== Replays ===
Home team	Score	Away team
Dumbarton (3)	1 – 4	Montrose (3)
Alloa Athletic (3)	1 – 3	Ross County (NL)

== Second round ==
Home team	Score	Away team
Ross County (NL)	2 – 2	Queen of the South (3)
Spartans (NL)	0 – 0	Cowdenbeath (3)
Inverness Thistle (NL)	1 – 1	East Fife (3)
Berwick Rangers (3)	1 – 0	Albion Rovers (3)
Fraserburgh (NL)	1 – 4	Cove Rangers (NL)
Montrose (3)	0 – 2	Arbroath (3)
Queen's Park (3)	1 – 2	Stranraer (3)
Stirling Albion (3)	2 – 0	Stenhousemuir (3)

=== Replays ===
Home team	Score	Away team
Queen of the South (3)	2 – 6	Ross County (NL)
Cowdenbeath (3)	2 – 0	Spartans (NL)
East Fife (3)	1 – 0	Inverness Thistle (NL)

== Third round ==
Home team	Score	Away team
Rangers (1)	2 – 0	Dunfermline Athletic (1)
Ross County (NL)	1 – 6	Meadowbank Thistle (2)
Clyde (2)	0 – 2	Hibernian (1)
Aberdeen (1)	0 – 1	Motherwell (1)
Airdrieonians (2)	2 – 1	Hearts (1)
Clydebank (2)	0 – 1	Ayr United (2)
Cove Rangers (NL)	1 – 2	Cowdenbeath (3)
Dundee (2)	1 – 0	Brechin City (2)
East Fife (3)	1 – 1	Dundee United (1)
Forfar Athletic (2)	0 – 2	Celtic (1)
Kilmarnock (2)	3 – 2	Arbroath (3)
Partick Thistle (2)	0 – 0	Falkirk (2)
Raith Rovers (2)	0 – 1	Hamilton Academical (2)
St Johnstone (1)	0 – 0	Berwick Rangers (3)
Stirling Albion (2)	0 – 1	Greenock Morton (2)
Stranraer (3)	1 – 5	St Mirren (1)

=== Replays ===
Home team	Score	Away team
Berwick Rangers (3)	3 – 4	St Johnstone (1)
Falkirk (2)	4 – 3	Partick Thistle (2)
Dundee United (1)	2 – 1	East Fife (3)

== Fourth round ==
Home team	Score	Away team
Greenock Morton (2)	3 – 0	Meadowbank Thistle (2)
Celtic (1)	3 – 0	St Mirren (1)
Ayr United (2)	0 – 0	Hamilton Academical (2)
Dundee (2)	2 – 0	Kilmarnock (2)
Dundee United (1)	2 – 0	Airdrieonians (2)
Motherwell (1)	4 – 2	Falkirk (2)
Rangers (1)	5 – 0	Cowdenbeath (3)
St Johnstone (1)	2 – 1	Hibernian (1)

=== Replay ===
Home team	Score	Away team
Hamilton Academical (2)	2 – 3	Ayr United (2)

== Quarter-finals ==
Home team	Score	Away team
Celtic (1)	2 – 0	Rangers (1)
Motherwell (1)	0 – 0	Greenock Morton (2)
St Johnstone (1)	5 – 2	Ayr United (2)
Dundee United (1)	3 – 1	Dundee (1)

=== Replay ===
Home team	Score	Away team
Greenock Morton (2)	1 – 1 (4 – 5 pen.)	Motherwell (1)

== Semi-finals ==
3 April 1991

Motherwell (1)	0–0	Celtic (1)

Hampden Park, Glasgow
Attendance: 41,765

6 April 1991

Dundee United (1)	2–1	St Johnstone (1)
John Clark; Duncan Ferguson		Harry Curran

East End Park, Dunfermline
Attendance: 16,560

=== Replay ===
9 April 1991

Motherwell	4–2	Celtic
Dougie Arnott (2); Colin O'Neill; Stevie Kirk		Tom Boyd (og); Anton Rogan

Hampden Park, Glasgow
Attendance: 31,371

== Final ==
18 May 1991

Motherwell	4–3	Dundee United
Ferguson 32'; O'Donnell 58'; Angus 65'; Kirk 94'		Bowman 55'; O'Neil 67'; Jackson 90'

Hampden Park, Glasgow
Attendance: 57,319
Referee: David Syme

== See also ==
- 1990–91 in Scottish football
- 1990–91 Scottish League Cup
