= Steve Kirk =

Scottish footballer and manager

Personal information
- Full name: Stephen David Kirk
- Date of birth: 3 January 1963 (age 63)
- Place of birth: Kirkcaldy, Scotland
- Position: Striker

Senior career*
Years	Team	Apps	(Gls)
1979–1980	East Fife	25	(2)
1981–1982	Stoke City	12	(0)
1982	Partick Thistle	0	(0)
1982–1986	East Fife	135	(35)
1986–1995	Motherwell	301	(63)
1995–1996	Falkirk	31	(9)
1996–1998	Raith Rovers	36	(2)
1998–1999	East Fife	55	(10)
2000–2004	Arbroath	2	(0)

Managerial career
- 1998–1999: East Fife
- 2003–2004: Arbroath
- 2004–2006: Dundonald Bluebell
- 2006–2009: Lochgelly Albert
- 2009–2011: Glenrothes
- * Club domestic league appearances and goals

Stephen David Kirk (born 3 January 1963) is a Scottish former professional footballer who played for East Fife, Stoke City, Partick Thistle, Motherwell, Falkirk, Raith Rovers, and Arbroath.

== Playing career ==
Born in Kirkcaldy, Kirk began his career with Fife side East Fife in 1979 and made 25 appearances for the Methil side before moving to English First Division side Stoke City for £10,000 in 1981. He made just twelve appearances for Stoke during the 1981–82 season and after failing to hold down a place in the first team he was released from his contract.

He returned to Scotland to play for Partick Thistle. Kirk returned to Bayview in 1982 and stayed for four years, scoring 35 times in 135 appearances and famously helping the Fifers beat Hibs in a memorable Scottish Cup third round replay in 1984, the same season East Fife clinched promotion from Division Two.

In 1986, Kirk began a nine-year association with Motherwell, which saw him play over 300 league games and scoring in each round, would go on to score the winner in the 1991 Scottish Cup final. After leaving Fir Park in 1995, Kirk had spells with Falkirk and Raith Rovers before returning first club in East Fife in 1998, eventually becoming player/manager. Kirk's managerial role lasted some fifteen months before his departure in late 1999. Kirk's last senior club was Arbroath, whom he joined in late 2000, becoming player-manager in December 2003 and leaving the following August.

From here, Kirk became player/manager at Dundonald Bluebell, adopting a similar position at Lochgelly Albert in September 2006. Kirk was appointed manager of Glenrothes Juniors on 30 June 2009.

On 11 November 2021, it was announced that Kirk was to be inducted into the Motherwell F.C. Hall of Fame.

== Career statistics ==
Appearances and goals by club, season and competition
Club	Season	League			FA Cup		League Cup		Total	
Club	Season	Division	Apps	Goals	Apps	Goals	Apps	Goals	Apps	Goals
Stoke City	1981–82	First Division	12	0	0	0	0	0	12	0
Career Total			12	0	0	0	0	0	12	0

== Honours ==
Motherwell

- Scottish Cup: 1990–91
