= Anatoliy Korobochka =

Ukrainian footballer

Personal information
- Full name: Anatoliy Vasylyovych Korobochka
- Date of birth: 5 January 1955 (age 71)
- Place of birth: Simferopol, Soviet Union
- Height: 1.73 m (5 ft 8 in)
- Position: Midfielder

Senior career*
Years	Team	Apps	(Gls)
1973–1977	Tavriya Simferopol	176	(38)
1978–1980	CSKA Moscow	64	(4)
1981–1983	SKA Odessa	133	(9)
1983–1984	Soviet Army Team (DDR)		
1984–1987	BSG Stahl Thale		
1987–1989	Einheit Wernigerode		
1989–1990	SG Falkensee-Finkenkrug		
1990–1991	Eintracht Loewenberg		

Managerial career
- 1991: CSKA Moscow-2
- 1998–2000: Tavriya Simferopol
- 2000: FC Spartak-Chukotka Moscow
- 2003–2006: FC Reutov
- 2007–2008: Heart of Midlothian
- 2010–2011: FC Gornyak Uchaly
- * Club domestic league appearances and goals

Anatoliy Vasylyovych Korobochka (Russian: Анатолий Васильевич Коробочка) (born 5 January 1955 in Simferopol, USSR, now Ukraine) is a former midfielder, and was formerly the Director of Football at Heart of Midlothian football club in Scotland.

Korobochka has played for Tavriya Simferopol, CSKA Moscow, SKA Odessa, and numerous clubs in GDR. After retiring from playing in 1991 he moved into coaching with CSKA Moscow, coaching their reserve team. Afterwards he became head of player development for them. In 1998, he became head-coach of Tavriya Simferopol. This was followed by brief spells with Spartak-Chukotka and FC Reutov, where was also a general director. Over the years he held the administrator position at CSKA Moscow and Torpedo Moscow.

Korobochka arrived at Heart of Midlothian in 2006 as Director of Football along with Sport Director Alex Koslovski and Eduard Malofeev, the consultant who himself had an unsuccessful six-game spell as interim head coach in October 2006.

On 30 July 2007 it was confirmed that Korobochka would take permanent charge of Hearts for the 2007–08 season, joint with Stephen Frail who had acted as Interim assistant coach the previous season. Their reign ended on 1 January 2008 following five consecutive defeats. Frail became caretaker manager, whilst Korobochka retained his position as Director of Football. On 22 July 2009 Hearts announced he had left this position. After that, he managed FC Gornyak Uchaly.

== Managerial stats ==
Team	Nat	From	To	Record				
Team	Nat	From	To	G	W	L	D	Win %
Heart of Midlothian	(Scotland)	2 March 2007	1 January 2008	33	13	14	6	39.39
