= List of Airdrieonians F.C. (1878) seasons =

This is a list of Airdrieonians F.C. seasons in Scottish football, from their foundation in 1878 to their dissolution in 2002. It details the club's achievements in senior league and cup competitions and the top scorers for each season. The list of top scorers also chronicles how the club's scoring records have progressed throughout the club's history.

The original Airdrieonians were formed in 1878 as Excelsior F.C. The club soon became members of the Scottish Football Association and initially began competing in the Scottish Cup and Qualifying Cup, before joining the Scottish Football League in 1895.

The Diamonds won the Scottish Cup in 1923–24, beating Hibernian in the final, and were also runners-up three times, in 1974–75 (losing to Celtic), in 1991–92 (to Rangers) and in 1994–95 (again to Celtic).

They were never champions of the Scottish League but finished second four times in succession between 1923 and 1926 in what was their most successful period. During the 1990s, in addition to the Scottish Cup final appearances (the first of which earned them a place in the 1992–93 European Cup Winners' Cup) they also reached the semi-finals of the Scottish League Cup in the same seasons, but lost on penalties both times. Those were two of six occasions where Airdrie reached the penultimate stage of the League Cup, but they never made it to the showpiece match in that competition.

In 1994 the club moved from their Broomfield Park home after 102 years. They spent four seasons as tenants of Clyde at Broadwood Stadium in Cumbernauld. The burden of the construction cost of their new all-seater ground (the Excelsior Stadium) was made worse with the deterioration of their supporter base due to lack of investment in the playing staff and the years playing away from their home town, which placed severe financial strain on the club. Despite managing to remain in the second tier for nine successive seasons and win the lower-division Scottish Challenge Cup two years running, they were dissolved in 2002 due to debt.

Local businessmen subsequently took control of struggling Clydebank, renamed them Airdrie United and relocated the team to Airdrie for 2002–03, changing the playing colours to those of the original Airdrieonians but retaining the league place of Clydebank. In 2013, the new club was allowed to call themselves Airdrieonians F.C. and use a close approximation of the historic entity's badge; however they are not a legal continuation of the 1878 club.

== Seasons ==
| Season | League | | Scottish Cup | League Cup | Other | Top scorer | |
| Season | Division | Position | Scottish Cup | League Cup | Other | Top scorer | |
|---|---|---|---|---|---|---|---|
| 1878–79 | N/A | N/A | Unknown | N/A | N/A | Unknown | Unknown |
| 1879–80 | N/A | N/A | Unknown | N/A | N/A | Unknown | Unknown |
| 1880–81 | N/A | N/A | Unknown | N/A | N/A | Unknown | Unknown |
| 1881–82 | N/A | N/A | Second round | N/A | N/A | Unknown | Unknown |
| 1882–83 | N/A | N/A | Second round | N/A | N/A | Unknown | Unknown |
| 1883–84 | N/A | N/A | First round | N/A | N/A | Unknown | Unknown |
| 1884–85 | N/A | N/A | Second round | N/A | N/A | Unknown | Unknown |
| 1885–86 | N/A | N/A | Fourth round | N/A | Lanarkshire Cup winners | Unknown | Unknown |
| 1886–87 | N/A | N/A | Second round | N/A | Lanarkshire Cup winners | Unknown | Unknown |
| 1887–88 | N/A | N/A | Third round | N/A | Lanarkshire Cup winners | Unknown | Unknown |
| 1888–89 | N/A | N/A | First round | N/A | Glasgow Exhibition Trophy – First round | Unknown | Unknown |
| 1889–90 | N/A | N/A | Fourth round | N/A | N/A | Unknown | Unknown |
| 1890–91 | Did not enter | N/A | Fourth round | N/A | Lanarkshire Cup winners | Unknown | Unknown |
| 1891–92 | Did not enter | N/A | Unknown | N/A | Lanarkshire Cup winners | Unknown | Unknown |
| 1892–93 (Note: First season playing home matches at Broomfield Park.) | Did not enter | N/A | First round | N/A | N/A | Unknown | Unknown |
| 1893–94 | Did not enter | N/A | First round | N/A | N/A | Unknown | Unknown |
| 1894–95 | Division Two | 6th | First round | N/A | N/A | Unknown | Unknown |
| 1895–96 | Division Two | 5th | Unknown | N/A | N/A | Unknown | Unknown |
| 1896–97 | Division Two | 3rd | Unknown | N/A | Lanarkshire Cup winners | Unknown | Unknown |
| 1897–98 | Division Two | 8th | Unknown | N/A | Lanarkshire Cup winners | Unknown | Unknown |
| 1898–99 | Division Two | 5th | First round | N/A | N/A | Unknown | Unknown |
| 1899–1900 | Division Two | 9th | First round | N/A | N/A | Unknown | Unknown |
| 1900–01 | Division Two | 2nd | First round | N/A | N/A | Unknown | Unknown |
| 1901–02 | Division Two | 4th | First round | N/A | N/A | Unknown | Unknown |
| 1902–03 | Division Two | 1st | First round | N/A | Lanarkshire Cup winners | Unknown | Unknown |
| 1903–04 | Division One | 11th= | First round | N/A | Lanarkshire Cup winners | Unknown | Unknown |
| 1904–05 | Division One | 4th | Semi-final | N/A | N/A | Unknown | Unknown |
| 1905–06 | Division One | 3rd | Quarter Final | N/A | N/A | Unknown | Unknown |
| 1906–07 | Division One | 4th | First round | N/A | N/A | Unknown | Unknown |
| 1907–08 | Division One | 6th | First round | N/A | N/A | Unknown | Unknown |
| 1908–09 | Division One | 5th | First round | N/A | Lanarkshire Cup winners | Unknown | Unknown |
| 1909–10 | Division One | 9th | Second round | N/A | N/A | Unknown | Unknown |
| 1910–11 | Division One | 11th | Second round | N/A | Lanarkshire Cup winners | Unknown | Unknown |
| 1911–12 | Division One | 10th | Second round | N/A | N/A | Unknown | Unknown |
| 1912–13 | Division One | 3rd= | Third round | N/A | Lanarkshire Cup winners | James Reid | 30 (Note: League goals only; top scorer in division.) |
| 1913–14 | Division One | 6th | Third round | N/A | Lanarkshire Cup winners | James Reid | 27 |
| 1914–15 | Division One | 11th | N/A (Note: The Scottish Cup was not held in the 1914–15, 1915–16, 1916–17, 1917–18 or 1918–19 seasons due to World War I, or the 1939–40, 1940–41, 1941–42, 1942–43, 1943–44, 1944–45 or 1945–46 seasons due to World War II.) | N/A | Lanarkshire Cup winners | Unknown | Unknown |
| 1915–16 | Division One | 15th | N/A | N/A | N/A | Unknown | Unknown |
| 1916–17 | Division One | 4th | N/A | N/A | N/A | Bert Yarnall | 39 |
| 1917–18 | Division One | 15th | N/A | N/A | Lanarkshire Cup winners | Unknown | Unknown |
| 1918–19 | Division One | 13th | N/A | N/A | Victory Cup – Semi-final Lanarkshire Cup winners | Unknown | Unknown |
| 1919–20 | Division One | 7th | First round | N/A | N/A | Unknown | Unknown |
| 1920–21 | Division One | 10th | First round | N/A | N/A | Unknown | Unknown |
| 1921–22 | Division One | 16th | Third round | N/A | Lanarkshire Cup winners | Unknown | Unknown |
| 1922–23 | Division One | 2nd | Second round | N/A | Lanarkshire Cup winners | Unknown | Unknown |
| 1923–24 | Division One | 2nd | Winners | N/A | N/A | Unknown | Unknown |
| 1924–25 | Division One | 2nd | Third round | N/A | Lanarkshire Cup winners | Unknown | Unknown |
| 1925–26 | Division One | 2nd | Quarter-final | N/A | N/A | Unknown | Unknown |
| 1926–27 | Division One | 4th | Second round | N/A | N/A | Unknown | Unknown |
| 1927–28 | Division One | 13th | Third round | N/A | N/A | Unknown | Unknown |
| 1928–29 | Division One | 15th | Third round | N/A | N/A | Unknown | Unknown |
| 1929–30 | Division One | 12th | Third round | N/A | N/A | Unknown | Unknown |
| 1930–31 | Division One | 9th | Second round | N/A | Lanarkshire Cup winners | Unknown | Unknown |
| 1931–32 | Division One | 14th | Semi-final | N/A | N/A | Unknown | Unknown |
| 1932–33 | Division One | 18th | Second round | N/A | N/A | Unknown | Unknown |
| 1933–34 | Division One | 18th | First round | N/A | N/A | Unknown | Unknown |
| 1934–35 | Division One | 14th | Quarter-final | N/A | Lanarkshire Cup winners | Unknown | Unknown |
| 1935–36 | Division One | 19th | Second round | N/A | N/A | Unknown | Unknown |
| 1936–37 | Division Two | 4th | Second round | N/A | N/A | Unknown | Unknown |
| 1937–38 | Division Two | 3rd | First round | N/A | Lanarkshire Cup winners | Unknown | Unknown |
| 1938–39 | Division Two | 4th | Second round | N/A | N/A | Unknown | Unknown |
| 1939–40 | Emergency League West (Note: The official Scottish Football League was suspended from 1939 to 1946 due to World War II. Unofficial competitions were held.) | 9th | N/A | N/A | Emergency Cup – Semi-finals | Unknown | Unknown |
| 1940–41 | Southern League | 4th | N/A | Southern League Cup – Group stage | Summer Cup – First round | Unknown | Unknown |
| 1941–42 | Southern League | 14th | N/A | Southern League Cup – Group stage | Summer Cup – First round | Unknown | Unknown |
| 1942–43 | Southern League | 15th | N/A | Southern League Cup – Group stage | Summer Cup – First round | Unknown | Unknown |
| 1943–44 | Southern League | 14th | N/A | Southern League Cup – Group stage | Summer Cup – First round | Unknown | Unknown |
| 1944–45 | Southern League | 16th | N/A | Southern League Cup – Group stage | Summer Cup – First round | Unknown | Unknown |
| 1945–46 | Southern League B Division | 4th | N/A | Southern League Cup – Semi-final | Victory Cup – Second round B Division Supplementary Cup winners | Unknown | Unknown |
| 1946–47 | Division B | 2nd | First round | Quarter-final | N/A | Unknown | Unknown |
| 1947–48 | Division A | 15th | Quarter-final | Group stage | N/A | Unknown | Unknown |
| 1948–49 | Division B | 3rd | First round | Quarter-final | N/A | Unknown | Unknown |
| 1949–50 | Division B | 2nd | First round | Quarter-final | N/A | Unknown | Unknown |
| 1950–51 | Division A | 14th | Quarter-final | Group stage | N/A | Unknown | Unknown |
| 1951–52 | Division A | 13th | Quarter-final | Group stage | | Unknown | Unknown |
| 1952–53 | Division A | 14th | Third round | Group stage | N/A | Unknown | Unknown |
| 1953–54 | Division A | 15th | First round | Group stage | N/A | Unknown | Unknown |
| 1954–55 | Division B | 1st | Semi-final | Semi-final | N/A | Unknown | Unknown |
| 1955–56 | Division One | 7th | Quarter-final | Group stage | N/A | Unknown | Unknown |
| 1956–57 | Division One | 11th | Quarter-final | Group stage | N/A | Hugh Baird | 33 |
| 1957–58 | Division One | 16th | First round | Group stage | N/A | Unknown | Unknown |
| 1958–59 | Division One | 5th | Second round | Group stage | | Unknown | Unknown |
| 1959–60 | Division One | 16th | Third round | Group stage | N/A | Unknown | Unknown |
| 1960–61 | Division One | 13th | Semi-final | Group stage | N/A | Unknown | Unknown |
| 1961–62 | Division One | 15th | First round | Group stage | N/A | Unknown | Unknown |
| 1962–63 | Division One | 11th | Second round (Note: The first round tie against Stranraer was rearranged 33 times due to inclement weather during the winter of 1962–63 in the United Kingdom.) | Group stage | Lanarkshire Cup winners | Unknown | Unknown |
| 1963–64 | Division One | 15th | Third round | Group stage | Summer Cup – Group stage | Unknown | Unknown |
| 1964–65 | Division One | 15th | Second round | Group stage | Summer Cup – Group stage | Unknown | Unknown |
| 1965–66 | Division Two | 2nd | First round | Quarter-final | Lanarkshire Cup winners | Unknown | Unknown |
| 1966–67 | Division One | 13th | Second round | Group stage | Lanarkshire Cup winners | Unknown | Unknown |
| 1967–68 | Division One | 13th | Quarter-final | Group stage | N/A | Unknown | Unknown |
| 1968–69 | Division One | 7th | Quarter-final | Group stage | N/A | Unknown | Unknown |
| 1969–70 | Division One | 12th | Second round | Group stage | Lanarkshire Cup winners | Unknown | Unknown |
| 1970–71 | Division One | 9th | Semi-final | Group stage | Texaco Cup – Quarter-final Lanarkshire Cup winners | Unknown | Unknown |
| 1971–72 | Division One | 15th | Fourth round | Group stage | Texaco Cup – Runners-up Drybrough Cup; Semi-final | Unknown | Unknown |
| 1972–73 | Division One | 18th | Quarter-final | Quarter-final | N/A | Unknown | Unknown |
| 1973–74 | Division Two | 1st | Third round | Second round | N/A | Unknown | Unknown |
| 1974–75 | Division One | 11th (Note: The teams placed 11th–18th were relegated to the new First Division, below a new Premier Division and above a new Second Division.) | Runners-up | Semi-final | Drybrough Cup – First round | Unknown | Unknown |
| 1975–76 | First Division | 8th | Third round | Group stage | Spring Cup – Winners Lanarkshire Cup winners | Unknown | Unknown |
| 1976–77 | First Division | 6th | Third round | Second round | N/A | Unknown | Unknown |
| 1977–78 | First Division | 10th | Third round | First round | N/A | Unknown | Unknown |
| 1978–79 | First Division | 6th | Fourth round | Third round | N/A | Unknown | Unknown |
| 1979–80 | First Division | 2nd | Fourth round | Second round | Lanarkshire Cup winners | Unknown | Unknown |
| 1980–81 | Premier Division | 7th | Third round | First round | Anglo-Scottish Cup – Quarter-final Drybrough Cup – First round | Unknown | Unknown |
| 1981–82 | Premier Division | 10th | Third round | Group stage | N/A | Unknown | Unknown |
| 1982–83 | First Division | 5th | Quarter-final | Group stage | N/A | Unknown | Unknown |
| 1983–84 | First Division | 10th | Fourth round | Group stage | Lanarkshire Cup winners | Unknown | Unknown |
| 1984–85 | First Division | 5th | Third round | Third round | N/A | Unknown | Unknown |
| 1985–86 | First Division | 9th | Fourth round | Second round | N/A | Unknown | Unknown |
| 1986–87 | First Division | 5th | Third round | Second round | N/A | Unknown | Unknown |
| 1987–88 | First Division | 6th | Fourth round | Second round | Lanarkshire Cup winners | Unknown | Unknown |
| 1988–89 | First Division | 4th | Third round | Second round | N/A | Unknown | Unknown |
| 1989–90 | First Division | 2nd | Third round | Third round | N/A | Unknown | Unknown |
| 1990–91 | First Division | 2nd | Fourth round | Second round | Challenge Cup; Second round | Unknown | Unknown |
| 1991–92 | Premier Division | 7th | Runners-up | Semi-final | N/A | Unknown | Unknown |
| 1992–93 | Premier Division | 12th | Third round | Second round | European Cup Winners' Cup – First round Lanarkshire Cup winners | Unknown | Unknown |
| 1993–94 (Note: Last season playing home matches at Broomfield Park.) | First Division | 3rd (Note: The teams placed 8th–12th were relegated to the Second Division, with a new Third Division below.) | Quarter-final | Third round | Challenge Cup; Quarter-final | Unknown | Unknown |
| 1994–95 (Note: Home matches played at Broadwood Stadium, Cumbernauld.) | First Division | 4th | Runners-up | Semi-final | Challenge Cup; Winners | Unknown | Unknown |
| 1995–96 | First Division | 8th | Quarter-final | Semi-final | Challenge Cup; First round Lanarkshire Cup winners | Unknown | Unknown |
| 1996–97 | First Division | 2nd (Note: Lost in a promotion play-off.) | Third round | Third round | Challenge Cup; Second round | Unknown | Unknown |
| 1997–98 | First Division | 4th | Third round | Third round | Challenge Cup; Quarter-final | Unknown | Unknown |
| 1998–99 (Note: First season playing home matches at Excelsior Stadium.) | First Division | 4th | Third round | Semi-final | Lanarkshire Cup winners (Note: The Scottish Challenge Cup was not held in the 1998–99 season.) | Unknown | Unknown |
| 1999–2000 | First Division | 9th | Third round | Second round | Challenge Cup; Second round | Unknown | Unknown |
| 2000–01 | First Division | 8th | Fourth round | Third round | Challenge Cup; Winners | Unknown | Unknown |
| 2001–02 | First Division | 2nd | Third round | Third round | Challenge Cup; Winners | Unknown | Unknown |
| 2002–03 | Club dissolved. Clydebank F.C. (seasons) rebranded as Airdrie United (seasons) to represent the community. | | | | | | |

== League performance summary ==
The Scottish Football League was founded in 1890 and, other than during seven years of hiatus during World War II, (Note: The incomplete 1939–40 edition has not been counted in the totals.) the national top division has been played every season since. (Note: The top tier became the Scottish Premier League in 1998, and all four divisions became the Scottish Professional Football League in 2013.) The following is a summary of Airdrieonians' divisional status until their dissolution in 2002:

- 105 total eligible seasons
- 60 seasons in top level (Note: Has existed between 1890–1939, and since 1946.)
- 41 seasons in second level (Note: Has existed between 1893–1915, 1921–1939 and since 1946.)
- 0 seasons in third level (Note: Has existed between 1923–1926, 1946–1949, and since 1976.)
- 0 seasons in fourth level (Note: Has existed since 1994.)
- 4 seasons not involved – before club was league member

== Sources ==
- Soccerbase
- FitbaStats
- Football Club History Database
