= Davie Hamilton =

Scottish footballer

Personal information
- Date of birth: 31 January 1882
- Place of birth: Glasgow, Scotland
- Date of death: 25 January 1950 (aged 67)
- Place of death: Glasgow, Scotland
- Position: Outside left

Youth career
- Hibernian Juveniles

Senior career*
Years	Team	Apps	(Gls)
?–1902	Cambuslang Hibernian		
1902–1912	Celtic	220	(55)
1903	→ Clyde (loan)		
1903	→ Ayr (loan)		
1912–1913	Dundee	14	(1)
1913–1914	Bathgate		

International career
1903	Scottish League XI	1	(0)
- * Club domestic league appearances and goals

David Hamilton (31 January 1882 – 25 January 1950) was a Scottish footballer who played as an outside left (winger). He played for Celtic for ten years between 1902 and 1912.

== Career ==
=== Club ===
Born in Glasgow, Hamilton played for junior side Cambuslang Hibernian as a teenager. He was selected for the Scotland Junior international team, alongside future Celtic teammate Alec Bennett. Having attracted the attention of Celtic with a hat-trick in a Junior test against Ireland played at their ground in March 1902, Hamilton was soon signed by the Hoops and within a few weeks was selected for the British League Cup final against Rangers which Celtic won. He spent part of that season on loan at Clyde then Ayr.

Hamilton secured his place in the Celtic team for the following season and appeared regularly over the next decade. He established a reputation as a wide man with great pace and dribbling skills, which earned him the nickname 'the Dancer'. He was part of a successful forward line which won six consecutive Scottish League titles between 1904–05 and 1909–10 to establish Celtic as a national force – their manager Willie Maley commented "The Bennett, McMenemy, Quinn, Somers and Hamilton forward line was a treat to watch in their sinuous movement and deadly attacks". In 1905, it was Hamilton who scored the winning goal in a unique playoff match against Rangers to determine the champions.

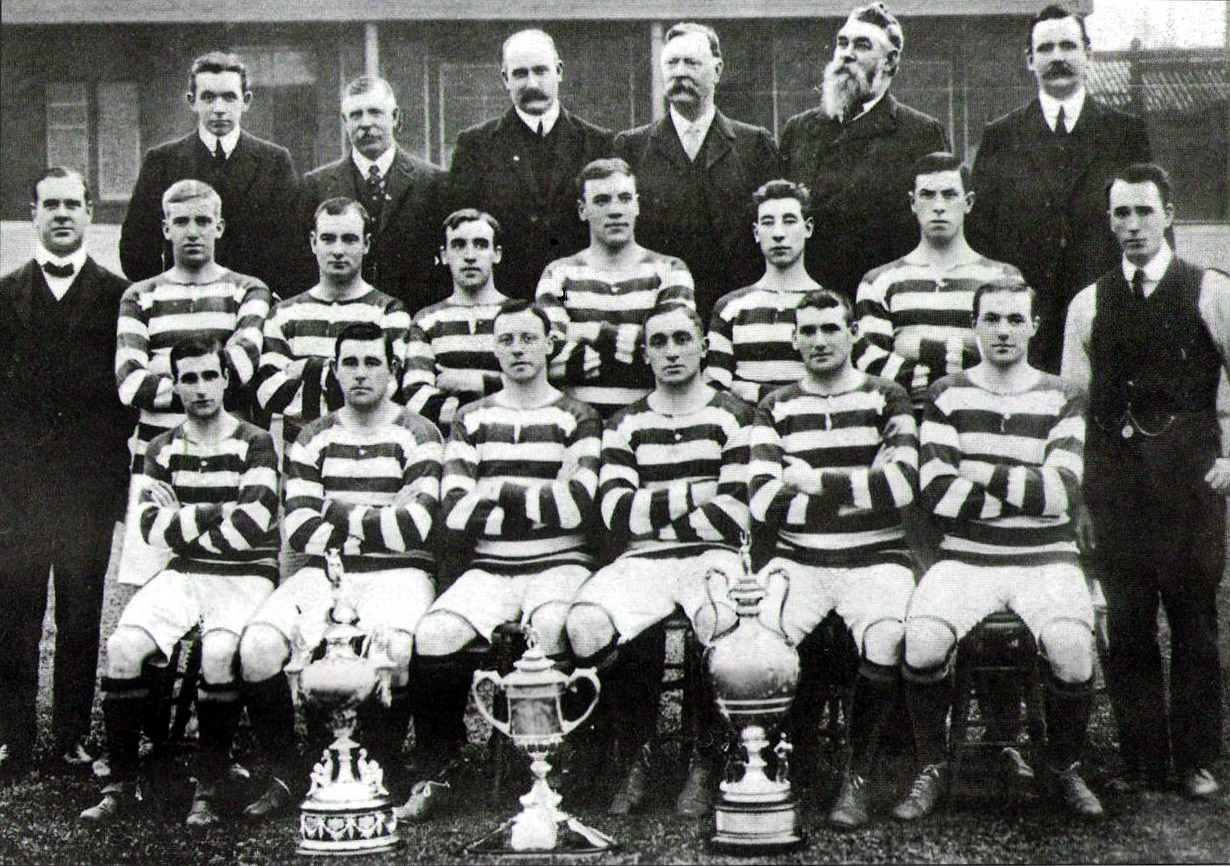
1908 Celtic team photo with the Glasgow Merchants Charity Cup, Scottish Cup and Glasgow Cup trophies; Hamilton is bottom row, extreme left

The 1907–08 season was particularly eventful for Hamilton. In the October he was suspended for two months for using 'obscene and threatening language' towards the referee during the Glasgow Cup Final against Rangers, with the remark believed to be "I wish I had a revolver!". He missed the replay of that final but returned in time for the Old Firm derby on New Year's Day and scored the opening goal (one of a total of 10 strikes against Rangers). Celtic finished as league champions, secured the Scottish Cup – with Hamilton scoring in the 5–1 win over St Mirren – and finalised a clean sweep of trophies available by winning the Glasgow Merchants Charity Cup.

In total, Hamilton played 259 League and Scottish Cup matches for Celtic and scored 62 goals. His popularity is indicated by the fact a brake club (an early form of supporters club who travelled by wagon) from the Gorbals area had his portrait displayed on their banner.

In 1912 Hamilton left Celtic and joined Dundee where he spent one year; he thereafter played for Bathgate (Central Football League) but retired in 1914.

=== International ===
Despite his success at club level Hamilton never appeared for the Scotland national football team nor in the regular trials of the period, but was selected for one Scottish Football League XI fixture against Ireland in 1903. He featured twice for the Glasgow FA's annual challenge match against Sheffield, in 1906 and 1909.

== Later life and legacy ==
Hamilton suffered a family tragedy just as his sporting career was ending when his wife Mary-Ann died from tuberculosis in 1915 (aged 33), leaving him to bring up their five children alone. He died in Glasgow in 1950.

In 2011 a Celtic delegation including descendants of Hamilton and club representatives Jim Craig and Bobby Lennox attended Dalbeth Cemetery in the East End of Glasgow to mark his grave with a tributary headstone.

== Honours ==
- Scottish League (6): 1904–05, 1905–06, 1906–07, 1907–08, 1908–09, 1909–10
- Scottish Cup: 1903–04, 1907–08, 1910–11 (Note: Hamilton did not play in the 1906–07 final due to injury but was selected in every other round)
  - Finalist: 1908–09 (Note: No cup awarded due to rioting by fans after the replayed final)
- Glasgow Cup: 1904–05, 1905–06, 1906–07, 1907–08, (Note: Hamilton played in the first game but was suspended for the replay) 1909–10
- Glasgow Merchants Charity Cup: 1904–05, 1907–08
- British League Cup: 1902 (Note: This was a one-off tournament to raise funds for the 1902 Ibrox disaster fund.)
