= Alec McNair =

Scottish footballer and manager

Personal information
- Full name: Alexander McNair
- Date of birth: 24 December 1882
- Place of birth: Stenhousemuir, Scotland
- Date of death: 18 November 1951 (aged 68)
- Place of death: Stenhousemuir, Scotland
- Height: 1.72 m (5 ft 8 in)
- Position: Right back

Senior career*
Years	Team	Apps	(Gls)
1900–1904	Stenhousemuir		
1904–1925	Celtic	583	(8)

International career
1906–1920	Scotland	15	(0)
1908–1920	Scottish League XI	15	(0)
1918–1919	Scotland (wartime)	4	(0)

Managerial career
- 1925–1927: Dundee
- * Club domestic league appearances and goals

Alexander McNair (24 December 1882 – 18 November 1951) was a Scottish football player and manager. He played as a defender for Celtic for 21 years and represented the Scotland national team in 15 official internationals between 1906 and 1920. McNair also represented the Scottish League XI 15 times. (Note: The source lists 16 matches, but the first cap in 1908 is counted twice; McNair played in defence, but the forward position was occupied by Jimmy McMenemy.) He then managed Dundee from 1925 until 1927.

== Stenhousemuir ==
McNair began his career at Stenhousemuir. He played at inside right and was a regular goalscorer, helping the club win the Scottish Qualifying Cup in 1901 and 1902. He also played in the Stenhousemuir team that reached the Scottish Cup semi-final in 1903, losing 4–1 to Rangers.

== Celtic ==
In May 1904, McNair signed for Celtic. He initially played in a variety of positions, but when right-back Donnie McLeod left in 1908, McNair made that position his own. He was an integral part of the Celtic side spearheaded by Jimmy Quinn that won six successive league championships from 1904–05 to 1909–10. McNair had exceptional positional sense and ability to anticipate his opponents' moves. He was a precise tackler and had confidence in his ability to dribble the ball out of his own penalty area rather than rashly boot it forward. He was a calm and composed personality, and his demeanour earned him the nickname 'The Icicle'. Willie Maley, the Celtic manager, described McNair as "The coolest, most intelligent player I have ever seen."

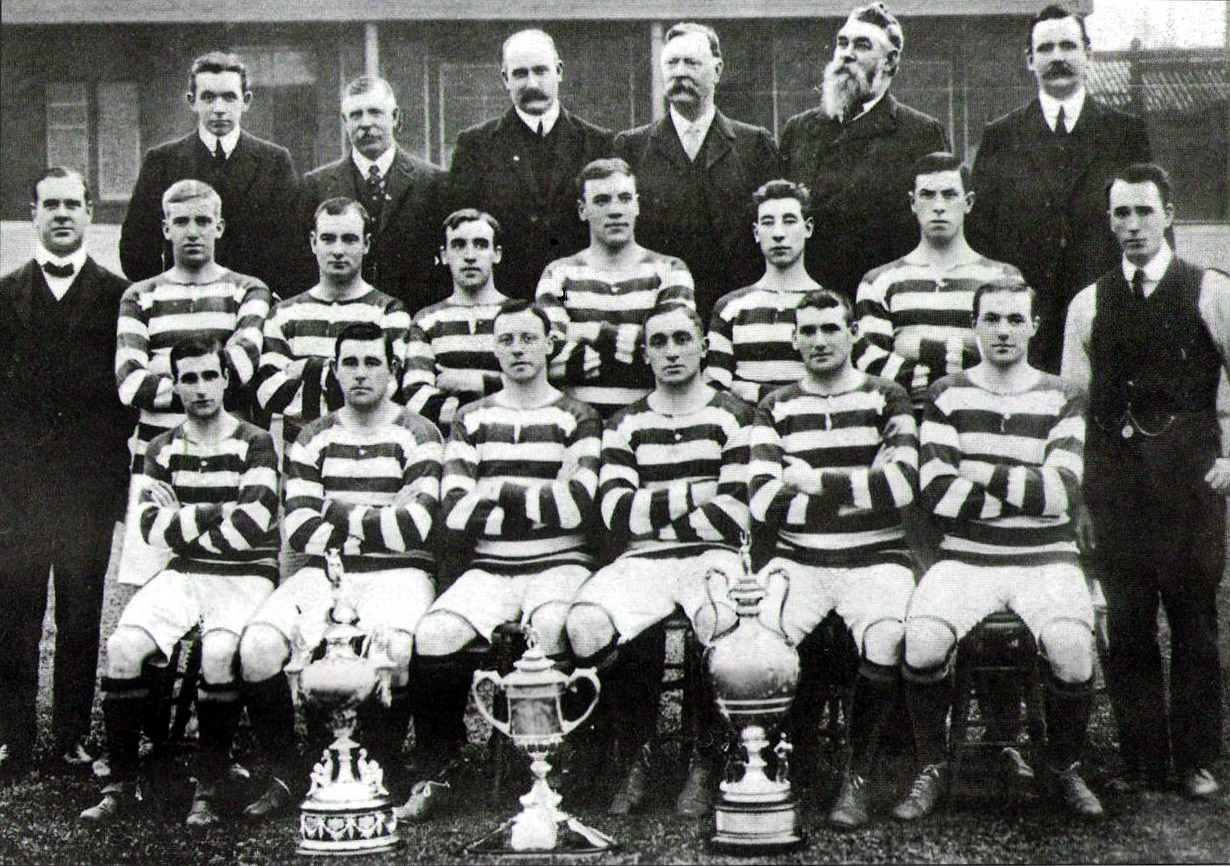
1908 Celtic team photo with the Glasgow Merchants Charity Cup, Scottish Cup and Glasgow Cup trophies; McNair is bottom row, far right

In his 21 years at Celtic McNair played a total of 641 games for the club in major competitions, winning the league championship 12 times and the Scottish Cup six times. He played his last game on 18 April 1925, a 1–1 draw with Queen's Park. He was 41 years old and is the oldest player ever to play for Celtic. McNair's appearances, trophy and caps totals might have been even higher had it not been for the interruption of World War I when the League continued but the Cup and internationals were suspended, considering that his success at club level and selection for Scotland continued after the conflict.

He received a benefit match in 1921, in which a combined Rangers/Celtic team played against a Scottish League team (the league also selected Celtic players John McFarlane and Tully Craig, who scored all their team's goals in a 3–1 win).

== Later years ==
McNair became manager of Dundee in June 1925. His first two seasons saw Dundee finish mid-table and then fifth. However, after a poor start to season 1927–28, he left Dens Park in October 1927. He then left full-time participation in football to become a stockbroker, but still kept some involvement in the game by working as a referee supervisor.

== Honours ==
=== Player ===
Stenhousemuir

- Scottish Qualifying Cup: 1900–01, 1901–02
- Central Combination: 1900–01, 1901–02
- Stirlingshire Cup: 1901–02

Celtic

- Scottish League champions (12): 1904–05, 1905–06, 1906–07, 1907–08, 1908–09, 1909–10, 1913–14, 1914–15, 1915–16, 1916–17, 1918–19, 1921–22
- Scottish Cup (6): 1906–07, 1907–08, 1910–11, 1911–12, 1913–14, 1922–23
- Glasgow Cup (7): 1906–07, 1907–08, 1909–10, 1915–16, 1916–17, 1919–20, 1920–21
- Glasgow Charity Cup (9): 1904–05, 1911–12, 1912–13, 1913–14, 1914–15, 1915–16, 1916–17, 1917–18, 1919–20
- War Fund Shield: 1917–18

Scotland

- British Home Championship: 1905–06 (shared), 1907–08 (shared), 1909–10, 1911–12 (shared)

=== Manager ===
Dundee

- Forfarshire Cup: 1924–25, 1925–26

== See also ==
- List of footballers in Scotland by number of league appearances (500+)
- List of Scotland national football team captains
- List of Scotland wartime international footballers

== Notes and references ==
Preceded by Jim Young	Celtic F.C. captain 1917–1920	Succeeded by William Cringan
