= Willie Maley =

Scottish footballer and manager (1868–1958)

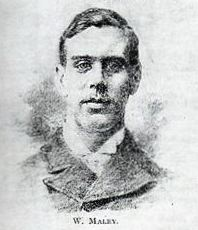
- Portrait of Maley as a player in 1892

Personal information
- Full name: William Patrick Maley
- Date of birth: 25 April 1868
- Place of birth: Newry, County Down, Ireland
- Date of death: 2 April 1958 (aged 89)
- Place of death: Glasgow, Scotland
- Position: Half-back

Youth career
- 1886: Cathcart Hazelbank Juniors

Senior career*
Years	Team	Apps	(Gls)
1887	Third Lanark	0	(0)
1888–1897	Celtic	70	(2)
1896	Manchester City	1	(0)
Total		71	(2)

International career
1893	Scotland	2	(0)
1892–1894	Scottish League XI	2	(0)

Managerial career
- 1897–1940: Celtic
- * Club domestic league appearances and goals

William Patrick Maley (25 April 1868 – 2 April 1958) was an Irish-born Scottish international football player and manager. He was the first manager of Celtic Football Club, and one of the most successful managers in Scottish football history. During his managerial tenure, Maley led Celtic to 30 major trophies (16 league championships and 14 Scottish Cups) in 43 consecutive years as manager. He is attributed to have coined the famous Celtic motto 'It is not his creed nor his nationality which counts; it's the man himself.'

== Early life ==
Maley was born in Newry Barracks, County Down, Ireland, the third son of Thomas Maley and Mary Montgomery. Thomas came from Ennis, County Clare, while Mary had been born in Canada to Scottish parents. At the time of his son's birth, Thomas was stationed in Newry as a sergeant in the 21st (Royal North British Fusilier) Regiment of Foot. In 1869, Thomas took honourable discharge from the British Army and the family moved to Scotland, settling in Cathcart – at that time a village just south of Glasgow.

Maley left school at the age of 13 and worked for a few years in the printworks of Miller, Higginbotham & Co., and then at the Telephone Company of Glasgow. Eventually he was offered the opportunity to train as a chartered accountant with Smith and Wilson, a Glasgow accountancy firm. As a young man, Maley was much more involved in athletics than in football, although he had played a few games for Cathcart Hazelbank Juniors in 1886, and had played with Third Lanark from later that year.

== Playing career ==
On a visit to Cathcart in December 1887 to invite Tom Maley to join Celtic, Brother Walfrid and the rest of the Celtic deputation met Willie Maley and they casually invited him to also play for the club. In 1888, he was signed by the fledgling Celtic and became one of the club's first players as a midfielder. In 1896, he made a single appearance for Manchester City in a Second Division match against Loughborough.

Due to his Scottish maternal grandparents and having lived in Scotland since the age of one, Maley played for the Scotland national team, earning two caps in 1893 against England and Ireland. Maley represented the Scottish League twice.

== Managerial career ==
In 1897, the board of Celtic directors appointed Willie Maley, at just 29 years of age, as Secretary-Manager – the first manager – of Celtic. He won the Scottish League championship for the club in his first full season as manager. Maley never worked with his players in training. He watched games from the directors' box and never indulged in team talks or spoke to his players at half-time or post-match. Maley would not even announce the team: players learned if they were in or out through reading the line-up in the newspaper.

Celtic had been a buying club in their opening decade, spending heavily to bring professionals to the club. Maley decided to scrap that and rely almost entirely on recruiting youngsters fresh from junior football.

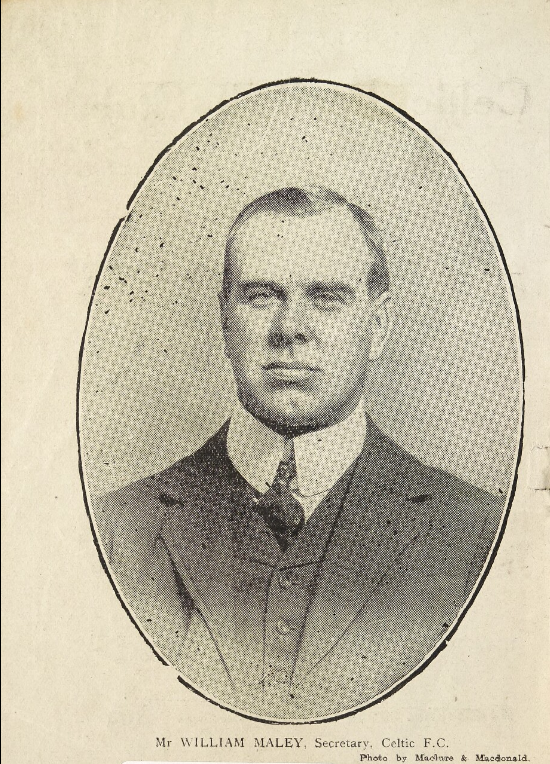
Portrait of Maley, 1910

Maley created a young team who won six consecutive league titles in a row between 1905 and 1910 and won the first Scottish League and Scottish Cup doubles. They were the best team in Glasgow, and the six-in-a-row record remained unbroken until the 1960s. As his six-in-a-row team began to age, Maley set about the task of building a younger team. This younger side, which included Patsy Gallacher and the apparently 'ageless' Jimmy McMenemy, won four league titles in succession between 1914 and 1917. They also set a UK record for an unbeaten run in professional football, 62 games (49 won, 13 drawn) from 13 November 1915 until 21 April 1917, which stood until it was broken by Brendan Rodgers' Celtic in November 2017.

That side won two more titles, in 1919 and 1922. Celtic continued to gather trophies throughout the 1920s and in the mid-1930s Maley built his third great team, featuring Jimmy Delaney and Jimmy McGrory. This side won the league title in 1936 and 1938 and the Scottish Cup in 1937. By then, Maley was approaching 70. The Maley years ended in a less than happy fashion. With Celtic at the bottom of the table, Maley finally retired after a meeting with the board of directors in February 1940. He was the longest-serving manager in Celtic's history. In his 43 years as manager, he won 16 Scottish League championships, 14 Scottish Cups, 14 Glasgow Cups and 19 Glasgow Charity Cups.

== Cultural references ==
Maley's Celtic career is detailed in the song Willie Maley, written by David Cameron, one of the most popular Celtic songs among fans.

== Honours ==
=== Player ===
Celtic (1888–1897)

- Scottish League champions (3): 1892–93, 1893–94, 1895–96
- Scottish Cup (1): 1891–92
- Glasgow Cup (4): 1890–91, 1891–92, 1894–95, 1895–96
- Glasgow Charity Cup (5): 1891–92, 1892–93, 1893–94, 1894–95, 1895–96
- Glasgow North Eastern Cup: 1889–90
- Clydesdale Harriers Cup: 1889
- Kilsyth Charity Cup: 1889

=== Manager ===
Celtic (1897–1940)

- Scottish League (16): 1897–98, 1904–05, 1905–06, 1906–07, 1907–08, 1908–09, 1909–10, 1913–14, 1914–15, 1915–16, 1916–17, 1918–19, 1921–22, 1925–26, 1935–36, 1937–38
- Scottish Cup (14): 1898–99, 1899–1900, 1903–04, 1906–07, 1907–08, 1910–11, 1911–12, 1913–14, 1922–23, 1924–25, 1926–27, 1930–31, 1932–33, 1936–37
- Empire Exhibition Cup: 1938* (Note: Competition staged only once to commemorate the Empire Exhibition, Scotland 1938.)
- British League Cup: 1902
- Budapest Cup: 1914
- Glasgow Cup (14): 1904–05, 1905–06, 1906–07, 1907–08, 1909–10, 1915–16, 1916–17, 1919–20, 1920–21, 1926–27, 1927–28, 1928–29, 1930–31, 1938–39
- Glasgow Charity Cup (18): 1898–99, 1902–03, 1904–05, 1907–08, 1911–12, 1912–13, 1913–14, 1914–15, 1915–16, 1916–17, 1917–18, 1919–20, 1920–21, 1923–24, 1925–26, 1935–36, 1936–37, 1937–38
- Glasgow League: 1898–99
- Inter City League: 1899–1900
- War Fund Shield: 1917–18
- St Vincent De Paul Cup: 1928

=== Individual ===
- 5th most decorated manager of all time (31 trophies) (Note: The ranking only includes trophies of at least national level.) (Note: Since article was published Pep Guardiola has moved up to second on the list with a total of 36 trophies.)
- Scottish Football Hall of Fame: 2009 induction

== Managerial statistics ==
As of 30 November 2013.

Team	From	To	Record				
Team	From	To	G	W	D	L	Win %
Celtic (Note: Includes all Scottish League (with 1905 playoff P1 W1) and Scottish Cup matches but no other minor cups (the Glasgow Cup is fully counted in the source:P125, W65, D32, L28) nor wartime competitions.)	September 1897	January 1940	1,612	1,039	315	258	64.45

== See also ==
- List of Scotland international footballers born outside Scotland
- List of longest managerial reigns in association football
- List of football managers with the most matches
