= 1909 Scottish Cup final =

1909 Scottish Cup Final
- Event: 1908–09 Scottish Cup
Rangers	Celtic
Rangers	Celtic
2	2
- Date: 10 Apr 1909
- Venue: Hampden Park, Glasgow
- Attendance: 70,000

Replay
Rangers	Celtic
1	1
- Date: 17 April 1909
- Venue: Hampden Park, Glasgow
- Attendance: 60,000

The 1909 Scottish Cup final was the final of the 36th season of the Scottish Cup. The match was an Old Firm affair contested by Rangers and Celtic at Hampden Park, with the trophy being withheld by the Scottish Football Association following crowd disorder.

The final ended 2–2 on 10 April, prompting a replay which took place on 17 April. When that ended 1–1, the initial assumption was that extra time would follow, but competition rules only provided for that in the event of a second replay. When it became clear to the crowd that extra time would not be played, and fuelled by rumours that the results were manipulated to increase ticket revenue, the crowd invaded the pitch. In the ensuing disorder, the goalposts were torn down, parts of the pitch were ripped up and the wooden pay-boxes were set alight. Mounted police and the fire brigade also came under attack and in total there were over 100 injuries.

Both clubs requested the SFA not schedule a second replay and subsequently, the trophy and medals were withheld. Queen's Park F.C., the owners of Hampden, were paid £500 in compensation by the SFA, who ordered both competing clubs to pay an additional £150 each.

== Summary ==
10 April 1909

Rangers	2–2	Celtic
Gilchrist; Bennett		Quinn 20'; Rennie (o.g.)

Hampden Park, Glasgow
Attendance: 70,000
Referee: J. B. Stark
17 April 1909

Rangers	1–1	Celtic
Gordon 20'		Quinn

Hampden Park, Glasgow
Attendance: 60,000
Referee: J. B. Stark

=== Teams ===
Celtic:
GK	Davey Adams
RB	Alec McNair
LB	Jimmy Weir
RH	James Young
CH	Joe Dodds
LH	Jimmy Hay
OR	Dan Munro
IR	Jimmy McMenemy
CF	Jimmy Quinn
IL	Peter Somers
OL	Davie Hamilton
Replay:	Willie Kivlichan replaced Munro

Rangers:
GK	Harry Rennie
RB	George Law
LB	Alex Craig
RH	John May
CH	James Stark
LH	Jimmy Galt
OR	Alec Bennett
IR	Thomas Gilchrist
CF	Robert Campbell
IL	Bill McPherson
OL	Alex Smith
Replay:	Jimmy Gordon, John Macdonald and Willie Reid replaced May, Gilchrist and Campbell
