= Jimmy McMenemy =

Scottish footballer (1880–1965)

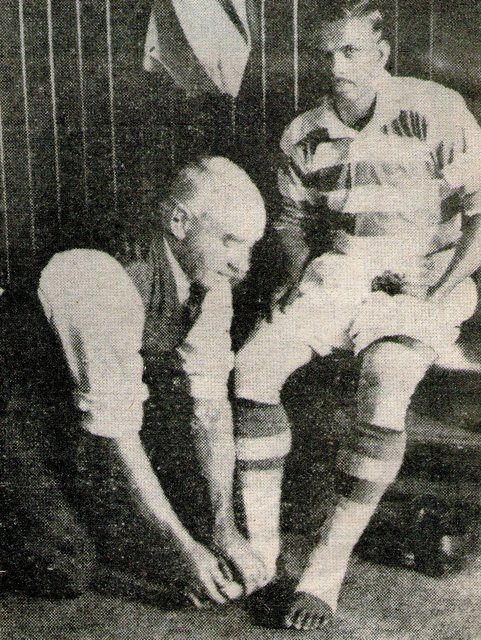
- Mohammed Salim having his feet bandaged, due to him playing barefoot, by Jimmy McMenemy the Celtic trainer in 1936.

Personal information
- Full name: James McMenamin
- Date of birth: 11 October 1880
- Place of birth: Rutherglen, Scotland
- Date of death: 23 June 1965 (aged 84)
- Place of death: Glasgow, Scotland
- Position: Inside forward

Senior career*
Years	Team	Apps	(Gls)
- Cambuslang Hibernian
1901–1902	Rutherglen Glencairn		
1902–1920	Celtic	456	(142)
1920–1923	Partick Thistle	56	(3)
Total		512	(145)

International career
1905–1920	Scotland	12	(5)
1908–1920	Scottish League XI	14	(2)
1918–1919	Scotland (wartime)	3	(0)

Managerial career
- Partick Thistle (coach)
- 1934–1940: Celtic (assistant)
- * Club domestic league appearances and goals

James McMenamin (11 October 1880 – 23 June 1965) was a Scottish footballer who most notably played for Celtic from 1902 to 1920 and later served as assistant manager in the 1930s. He has been described by the club as "a true Celtic legend".

== Early life ==
James was born in Rutherglen, Lanarkshire, on 11 October 1880 to John McMenamin and Hannah Regan; his father adopted the name 'McMenamin' after he moved to Scotland from County Tyrone. John's brother, also called James, settled in Rutherglen during the same period with his wife Ann Smith but maintained the traditional spelling 'McMenemy'. This – and also due to the player himself using both styles – has led to some mis-attributing of the player's date of birth to that of his cousin (James McMenemy, born at Rutherglen on 23 August 1880).

== Playing career ==
=== Club ===
McMenemy began his career playing for local Junior teams Cambuslang Hibernian and Rutherglen Glencairn, winning the Scottish Junior Cup and Glasgow Junior League double with the latter in 1902, alongside Alec Bennett.

In June 1902, aged 21, he joined Celtic, where he would become a mainstay in the side for the next two decades. Nicknamed "Napoleon" by manager Willie Maley due to his strategic and leadership qualities and calmness, as well as an apparent resemblance to Napoleon Bonaparte, he was also said to be "a master of the deceptive movement" who "seldom troubled himself with the physical side of the game – he had no need."

He made his debut on 29 September 1902 against Hearts, scoring for the first time in a 3–0 win over Port Glasgow Athletic two months later. One of his first important actions was away from the pitch when he successfully persuaded Bennett to join him at the club; the pair would form Celtic's first famous forward line, along with Davie Hamilton (another former Cambuslang Hibs player), Jimmy Quinn and Peter Somers.

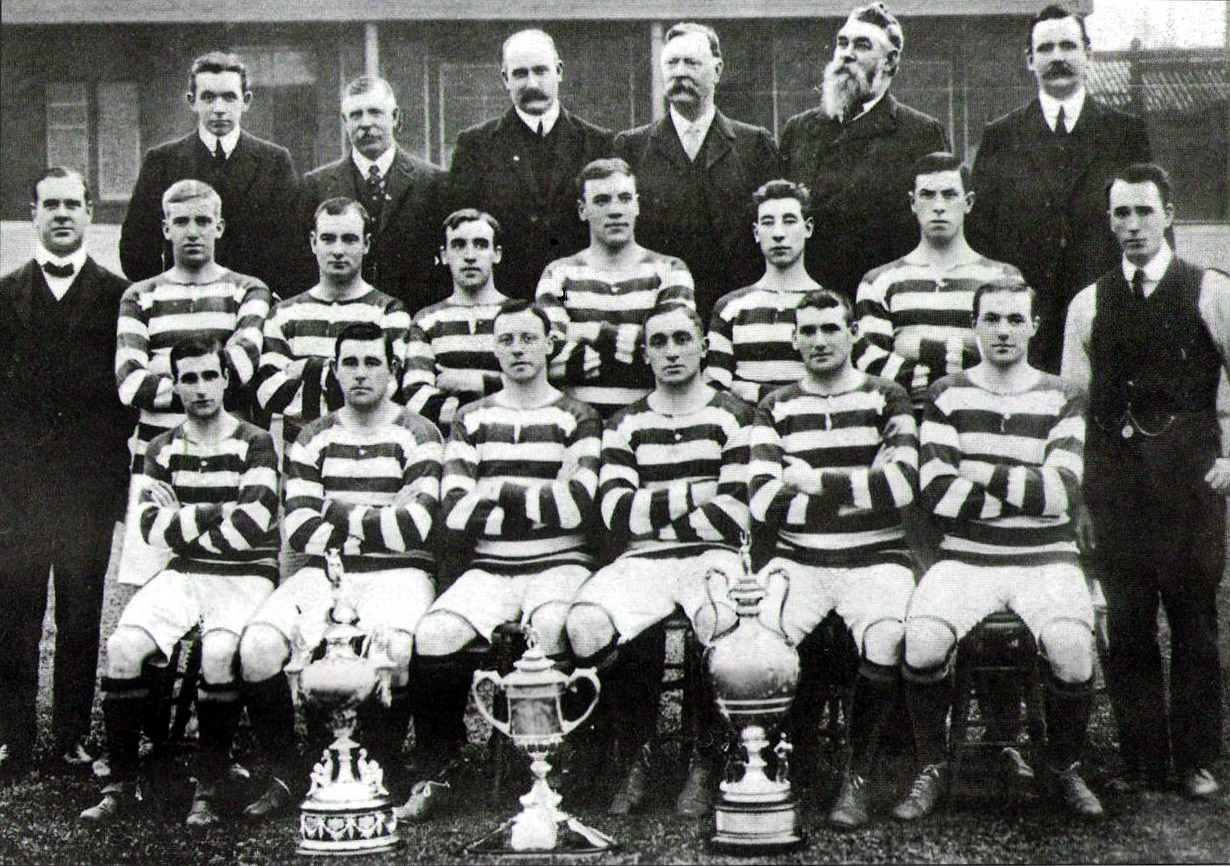
1908 Celtic team photo with the League Championship, Scottish Cup and Glasgow Cup trophies; McMenemy is top row, third left (counting players only)

McMenemey was in the team that defeated Rangers 3–2 in the 1904 Scottish Cup final after being down 2–0, and also played and opened the scoring in a playoff match against the same opposition to decide the 1904–05 league title. It would be the first of six league titles in a row between 1905 and season 1909–10, with Celtic also securing two further Scottish Cups in 1907 and 1908. Rangers built a strong team of their own (including Alec Bennett, who had switched sides in 1908) which took the next three titles, but McMenemy remained with Celtic while others were replaced.

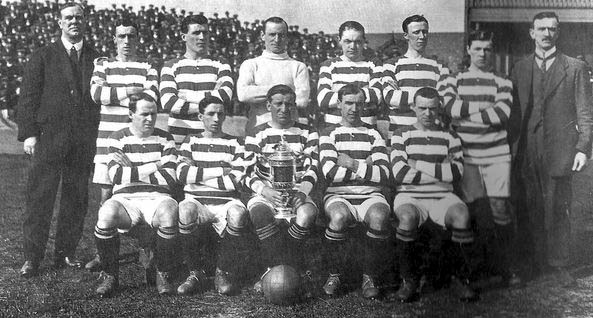
1914 Celtic team photo with the Scottish Cup; McMenemy bottom row, second from right

On the eve of World War I in season 1913–14, the club were again crowned champions and Cup winners. This team, including new stars Patsy Gallacher, Jimmy McColl and Andy McAtee plus survivors from the earlier successful squad such as Alec McNair and 'Sunny Jim' Young would win a further three titles, and set a sequence of 62 league games unbeaten (65 including the minor Glasgow Cup and Glasgow Merchants Charity Cup) which would not be surpassed for a century. In October 1913, McMenemy suffered a broken collar bone during a match against Aberdeen. After jumping up to win a header, McMenemy collided mid-air with John Wyllie, "and they both fell like a log". McMenemy was not to play for Celtic again until 27 December in a 6-0 victory over Ayr United.

McMenemy, now in his mid-30s, was one of the Celtic players who worked in reserved occupations during the conflict – in his case manufacturing munitions – so was not called to frontline action and able to continue to playing football whenever possible (in summer 1918 he was due to be called up, with one brother having been killed and another wounded on the battlefield, but fell ill with influenza and did not leave Scotland before the armistice in November of that year). A teammate, Peter Johnstone, was one of those did perish on the Western Front.

Prior to season 1918–19, 38-year-old McMenemy retired from playing, only to return to Celtic by the halfway point of the season, where he was restored to the line-up and helped secure another Scottish League title, his eleventh overall. He also won six Scottish Cup medals with the club (although the only final in which he scored was 1912 against Clyde), an equally impressive total considering the trophy was withheld in 1909 and five editions were not contested during the war.

McMenemy made 515 appearances for Celtic in the League and Scottish Cup, scoring 166 goals. In Celtic's all-time records, he ranks in sixth place for league appearances and seventh for league goals. He is also the club's oldest goalscorer (39 years, 56 days v Motherwell, 6 December 1939) and third-oldest player (39 years, 194 days vs St Mirren, 22 April 1920). He also holds the record for scoring for Celtic in the most consecutive seasons, scoring in every season from 1902-03 to 1919-20.

In June 1920, McMenemy left Celtic and joined Partick Thistle where, in April 1921, aged, 40, he helped them to their one and only Scottish Cup victory, beating Rangers 1–0 in the final which was held at Celtic Park. He played on at Firhill for two more years, retiring in 1923.

=== International ===
McMenemy played 12 times for the Scotland national team, scoring five goals, and also represented the Scottish League XI 14 times, scoring twice. (Note: The source lists 13 matches, but does not include an appearance in 1908 instead listing Alec McNair twice.)

At the age of 40 he also took part in a 1921 summer tour of North America as a member of 'Third Lanark Scotland XI' (organised by Third Lanark and composed of players from seven different clubs); he was reunited with old teammate and rival Alec Bennett who thereafter became the Thirds manager.

== Coaching and later life ==
After retiring from playing, McMenemy spent some years away from football and spent time as a publican. He came back to Partick Thistle as a coach, then in 1934 returned to Celtic as trainer assisting Willie Maley (the same manager who had brought him to the club three decades earlier), helping players such as Jimmy Delaney and Willie Buchan to develop and taking charge of the squad which won the Empire Exhibition Trophy in 1938, having already secured that season's League title.

Maley retired in 1940, however McMenemy was not chosen to succeed him, the role instead going to Jimmy McStay. By then the world was again at war, and McMenemy and Celtic parted company. He died in Glasgow in 1965.

=== Legacy ===
In 2010, a selection of McMenemy's medals, Scotland caps and other memorabilia was sold at auction for £3,500.

In 2013, the Evening Times newspaper ranked him in 12th position among Celtic's greatest-ever players.

In 2014, the 'Celtic Graves Society' held a commemorative event for McMenemy in Dalbeth St Peters Cemetery to recognise his achievements, attended by family members and former players.

== Personal life ==
Jimmy McMenemy's six sons were also footballers: John won the Scottish Cup with Celtic in 1927 – just six years after his father's last win – and the Scottish League Championship with Motherwell in 1932; Harry played for Newcastle United where he won the FA Cup in 1932; Frank played for Hamilton Academical and Crystal Palace; and James (Maryhill) Joe (Strathclyde) and Neil (Strathclyde, Ayr United) were prominent junior players but did not play at the professional level. Joe McMenemy is also credited with saving the sister of Sean Fallon from drowning during a holiday in Sligo, after which the families became acquainted; Fallon would go on to serve Celtic as a player and coach for many years.

Lawrie McMenemy, the former manager of Southampton and many other teams, is a distant relation of the family.

== Honours ==
Rutherglen Glencairn

- Scottish Junior Cup: 1901–02
- Glasgow Junior League: 1901–02

Celtic

- Scottish League (11): 1904–05, 1905–06, 1906–07, 1907–08, 1908–09, 1909–10, 1913–14, 1914–15, 1915–16, 1916–17, 1918–19
- Scottish Cup (6): 1903–04, 1906–07, 1907–08, 1910–11, 1911–12, 1913–14
  - Finalist: 1908–09 (Note: No cup awarded due to rioting by fans after the replayed final)
- Glasgow Cup (8): 1904–05, 1905–06, 1906–07, 1907–08, 1909–10, 1915–16, 1916–17, 1919–20

Glasgow Charity Cup (10): 1902–03, 1904–05, 1907–08, 1911–12, 1913–14, 1914–15, 1915–16, 1916–17, 1917–18, 1919–20

- War Fund Shield: 1917–18
- Budapest Cup: 1914

Partick Thistle

- Scottish Cup: 1920–21

Scotland

- British Home Championship (2): 1909–10, 1911–12 (shared)

== See also ==
- List of footballers in Scotland by number of league appearances (500+)
- List of Scottish football families
