= Willie Loney =

Scottish footballer

Personal information
- Date of birth: 31 May 1879
- Place of birth: Denny, Scotland
- Date of death: 6 March 1956 (aged 76)
- Place of death: Drumchapel, Scotland
- Position: Centre half

Senior career*
Years	Team	Apps	(Gls)
- Denny Athletic
1900–1913	Celtic	252	(28)
1908	→ Belfast Celtic (loan)		
1913–1914	Motherwell	13	(1)
1914–1917	Partick Thistle	15	(2)
1915–1916	→ Clydebank (loan)		

International career
1909–1910	Scottish League XI	3	(0)
1910	Scotland	2	(0)
- * Club domestic league appearances and goals

William Loney (31 May 1879 – 6 March 1956) was a Scottish footballer who played for Celtic, Partick Thistle, Motherwell and Scotland. He had a key role in the Celtic team of the 1900s which won six consecutive Scottish Football League championships.

His brother James (Clyde, Dundee Hibernian) and cousin Harry (Falkirk, Alloa Athletic, Dumbarton) were also footballers.

== Honours ==
Celtic

- Scottish Division One: 1904–05, 1905–06, 1906–07, 1907–08, 1908–09, 1909–10
- Scottish Cup: 1903–04, 1906-07 , 1907–08, 1911–12
- Glasgow Cup: 1904–05, 1905–06, 1907–08, 1909–10
