= 1907–08 British Home Championship =

Tournament details
- Host country: England, Ireland, Scotland and Wales
- Dates: 15 February – 11 April 1908
- Teams: 4

Final positions
- Champions: England; Scotland (shared)

Tournament statistics
- Matches played: 6
- Goals scored: 23 (3.83 per match)
- Top scorer(s): (England) Vivian Woodward (Scotland) Jimmy Quinn (4 goals)

The 1907–08 British Home Championship was an annual football competition played between the British Home Nations during the second half of the 1907–08 season. England and Scotland shared the title, having each beaten Wales and Ireland in their opening matches before drawing 1–1 with each other in the final game.

England began the strongest side, although all four teams played well in their opening games, both Ireland and Wales running their opponents close. In the second matches however, England and Scotland's quality told, as England beat Wales 7–1 in Wrexham and Ireland succumbed 5–0 in Dublin. In the final matches Ireland and Wales, playing for pride both fought hard, with Ireland clinching a 1–0 win while England and Scotland were unable to break the deadlock and so drew the game and competition, as goal difference was not at this stage used to differentiate teams.

England followed this tournament by becoming the first Home Nation to play a non-British nation with a tour of Central Europe, playing against Austria twice, Hungary and Bohemia. In October the England amateur team followed this by winning gold in the football tournament at the 1908 Olympics, held in London.

== Table ==
Team	Pld	W	D	L	GF	GA	GD	Pts
England (C)	3	2	1	0	11	3	+8	5
Scotland (C)	3	2	1	0	8	2	+6	5
Ireland	3	1	0	2	2	8	−6	2
Wales	3	0	0	3	2	10	−8	0

Rules for classification: 1) points. The points system worked as follows: 2 points for a win and 1 point for a draw.
(C) Co-champions

== Results ==
15 February 1908

Ireland	1–3	England
Hannon 13'		Hilsdon 7', 83'; Woodward 80'

Solitude, Belfast
Attendance: 22,600
Referee: Tom Robertson (Scotland)

7 March 1908

Scotland	2–1	Wales
Bennett 60'; Lennie 87'		L. Jones 30'

Dens Park, Dundee
Attendance: 18,000
Referee: James Mason (England)

14 March 1908

Ireland	0–5	Scotland
		Quinn 3', 55', 70', 75'; Galt 23'

Dalymount Park, Dublin
Attendance: 10,000
Referee: James T. Ibbotson (England)

16 March 1908

Wales	1–7	England
Davies 90'		Woodward 18', 70', 80'; Hilsdon 40', 63'; Windridge 25'; Wedlock 30'

Racecourse Ground, Wrexham
Attendance: 7,000
Referee: David Philp (Scotland)

4 April 1908

Scotland	1–1	England
Wilson 27'		Windridge 75'

Hampden Park, Glasgow
Attendance: 121,452
Referee: James Mason (England)

11 April 1908

Wales	0–1	Ireland
		Sloan 28'

Athletic Ground, Aberdare
Attendance: 6,000
Referee: James Ibbotson (England)

== Winning squads ==
- England

Name	Apps/Goals by opponent			Total	
Name	(Wales) WAL	(Ireland) IRE	(Scotland) SCO	Apps	Goals
George Hilsdon	1/2	1/2	1	3	4
Vivian Woodward	1/3	1/1	1	3	4
James Windridge	1/1	1	1/1	3	2
William Wedlock	1/1	1	1	3	1
Bob Crompton	1	1	1	3	0
Evelyn Lintott	1	1	1	3	0
Jesse Pennington	1	1	1	3	0
Jock Rutherford	1	1	1	3	0
Ben Warren	1	1	1	3	0
Arthur Bridgett			1	1	0
Sam Hardy			1	1	0
Harry Maskrey		1		1	0
George Wall		1		1	0
Horace Bailey	1			1	0
Harold Hardman	1			1	0

- Scotland

Name	Apps/Goals by opponent			Total	
Name	(Wales) WAL	(Ireland) IRE	(England) ENG	Apps	Goals
Charlie Thomson	1	1	1	3	0
Bobby Walker	1	1	1	3	0
Jimmy Quinn		1/4	1	2	4
James Galt	1	1/1		2	1
Willie Lennie	1/1	1		2	1
John May		1	1	2	0
Alec McNair	1		1	2	0
William Agnew	1	1		2	0
Harry Rennie	1	1		2	0
Andrew Wilson			1/1	1	1
Alec Bennett	1/1			1	1
Andy Aitken			1	1	0
James Howie			1	1	0
Peter McBride			1	1	0
Jimmy Sharp			1	1	0
Walter White			1	1	0
George Chaplin	1			1	0
Sandy MacFarlane	1			1	0
Jimmy Speirs	1			1	0
Bob McColl		1		1	0
James Mitchell		1		1	0
Bobby Templeton		1		1	0
