= Davey Adams =

Scottish footballer

Personal information
- Full name: David Robertson Adams
- Date of birth: 14 May 1883
- Place of birth: Oathlaw, Scotland
- Date of death: 29 November 1948 (aged 65)
- Place of death: Edinburgh, Scotland
- Position: Goalkeeper

Senior career*
Years	Team	Apps	(Gls)
–	Dunipace		
1902–1912	Celtic	247	(0)
- * Club domestic league appearances and goals

David Robertson Adams (14 May 1883 – 29 November 1948) was a Scottish footballer who played as a goalkeeper for Celtic at the start of the 20th century.

== Career ==
Born in Angus but raised largely in the Falkirk area, Adams joined Celtic near the end of 1902 from Junior side Dunipace, and made his first appearance in September 1903 in a 1–0 win over Hibernian at Celtic Park. He went on to play 291 Scottish Football League and Scottish Cup games for Celtic in a nine-year spell at the club, and was the last goalkeeper at the club to wear green-and-white hoops in games; after a rule change in 1910 specifying goalkeepers must wear a different colour, he wore a yellow jersey. Adams was a virtual ever-present in what is regarded as the first truly great Celtic side that won six consecutive Scottish League titles from 1904–05 to 1909–10.

At the start of the 1906–07 season, Adams cut his hand during a benefit match at Ibrox Stadium. The mishap was caused by a nail which had been inserted through a goal post for a five-a-side tournament. This incident precipitated the first known transfer between the two Old Firm clubs: Rangers' reserve goalkeeper Tom Sinclair was loaned to Celtic to cover for Adams's injury, and he went on to pick up a Glasgow Cup winner's medal with the Parkhead club.

Adams retired in 1912, settling in the East Lothian area.

== Honours ==
Celtic

- Scottish League: 1904–05, 1905–06, 1906–07, 1907–08, 1908–09, 1909–10
- Scottish Cup: 1903–04, 1906–07, 1907–08, 1910–11
- Glasgow Cup: 1904–05, 1905–06, 1907–08
