= 1907–08 in Scottish football =

Football in Scotland
- Season: 1907–08

1907–08 in Scottish football

Division One champions
- Celtic

Division Two champions
- Raith Rovers

Scottish Cup winners
- Celtic

Junior Cup winners
- Larkhall Thistle

Scotland national team
- 1908 BHC

The 1907–08 season was the 35th season of competitive football in Scotland and the 18th season of the Scottish Football League. This season also saw the first playing of the Scottish Consolation Cup.

== League competitions ==
=== Scottish League Division One ===
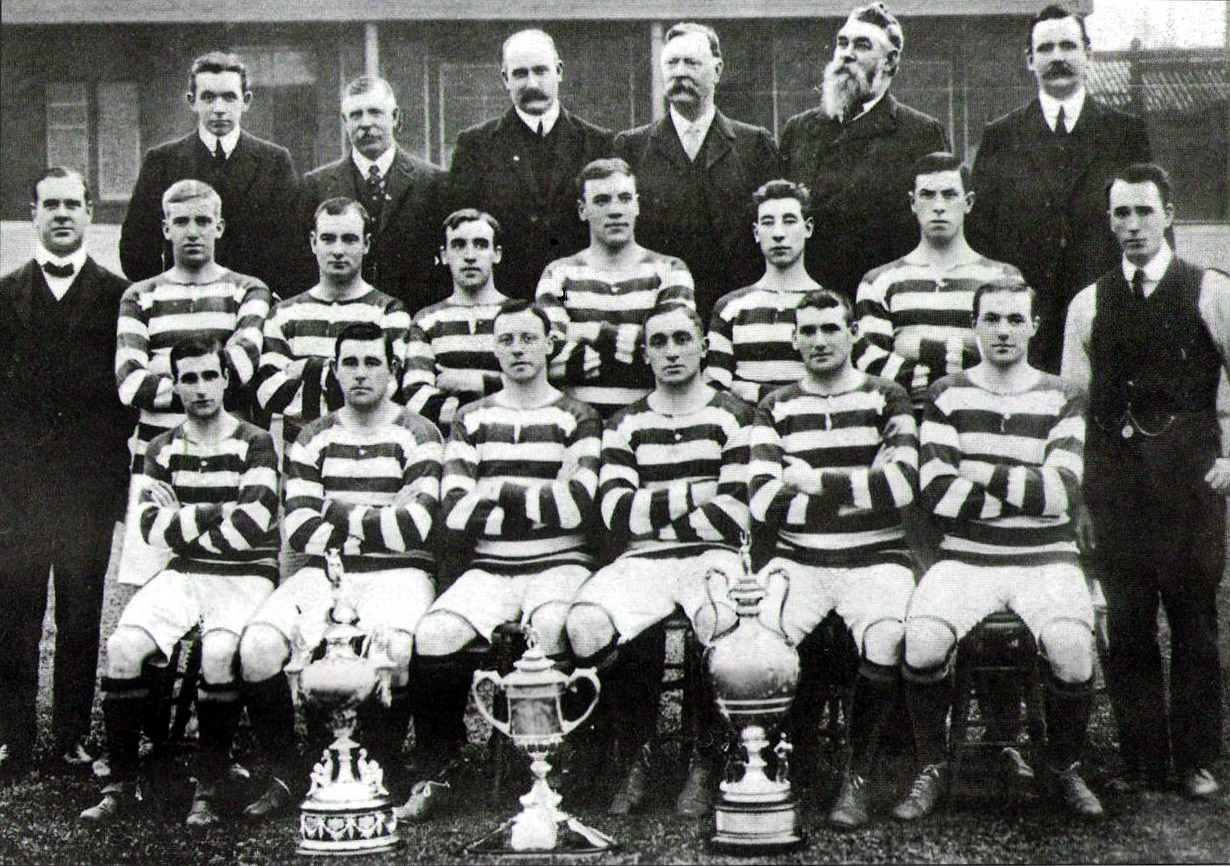
1908 Celtic team photo with the Glasgow Merchants Charity Cup, Scottish Cup and Glasgow Cup trophies

Celtic won the title ahead of Falkirk and Rangers. A 1–0 win at Rangers' home Ibrox in an Old Firm match on 25 April 1908 meant that they could not be caught by either pursuer. In the close season, the Celtic goalscorer Alec Bennett switched to Rangers, one of very few player moves directly between the rivals.

Pos	Team	Pld	W	D	L	GF	GA	GD	Pts
1	Celtic (C)	34	24	7	3	86	27	+59	55
2	Falkirk	34	22	7	5	103	42	+61	51
3	Rangers	34	21	8	5	74	40	+34	50
4	Dundee	34	20	8	6	71	28	+43	48
5	Hibernian	34	17	8	9	55	42	+13	42
6	Airdrieonians	34	18	5	11	58	41	+17	41
7	St Mirren	34	13	10	11	50	59	−9	36
8	Aberdeen	34	13	9	12	45	44	+1	35
9	Third Lanark	34	13	7	14	45	50	−5	33
10	Motherwell	34	12	7	15	61	53	+8	31
11	Heart of Midlothian	34	11	6	17	50	62	−12	28
12	Hamilton Academical	34	10	8	16	55	65	−10	28
13	Morton	34	9	9	16	43	66	−23	27
14	Partick Thistle	34	8	9	17	43	69	−26	25
15	Kilmarnock	34	6	13	15	38	61	−23	25
16	Queen's Park	34	7	8	19	54	84	−30	22
17	Clyde	34	5	8	21	38	75	−37	18
18	Port Glasgow Athletic	34	5	7	22	39	98	−59	17

(C) Champions

Champions: Celtic

=== Scottish League Division Two ===
Pos	Team	Pld	W	D	L	GF	GA	GD	Pts
1	Raith Rovers (C)	22	14	2	6	37	23	+14	30
2	Ayr	22	11	5	6	40	33	+7	27
2	Dumbarton	22	12	5	5	49	32	+17	27 (Note: Dumbarton were docked two points for fielding an ineligible player.)
4	Abercorn	22	9	5	8	33	30	+3	23
4	East Stirlingshire	22	9	5	8	30	32	−2	23
6	Ayr Parkhouse	22	11	0	11	38	38	0	22
7	Leith Athletic	22	8	5	9	41	40	+1	21
7	St Bernard's	22	8	5	9	31	32	−1	21
9	Albion Rovers	22	7	5	10	36	48	−12	19
10	Vale of Leven	22	5	8	9	25	31	−6	18
11	Arthurlie	22	6	5	11	33	45	−12	17
12	Cowdenbeath	22	5	4	13	26	35	−9	14

Source: statto.com
Rules for classification: Teams finish equal if level on points. Points system: 2 points for a win, 1 point for a draw, 0 points for a loss
(C) Champions

== Other honours ==
=== Cup honours ===
==== National ====
Competition	Winner	Score	Runner-up
Scottish Cup	Celtic	5 – 1	St Mirren
Scottish Qualifying Cup	St Bernard's	3 – 1	Raith Rovers
Scottish Consolation Cup	Alloa Athletic	2 – 0	Dumbarton
Scottish Junior Cup	Larkhall Thistle	1 – 0	Queen's Park Hampden XI (Note: The Hampden XI were the third XI of Queen's Park.)

==== County ====
Competition	Winner	Score	Runner-up
Aberdeenshire Cup	Aberdeen	4 – 0	Peterhead
Ayrshire Cup	Galston	2 – 1 (Note: Replay needed.)	Kilmarnock
Border Cup	Peebles Rovers	4 – 0	Duns
Dumbartonshire Cup	Renton	2 – 0	Dumbarton
East of Scotland Shield	Hibernian	2 – 1	Leith Athletic
Fife Cup	East Fife	4 – 2	Lochgelly Un
Forfarshire Cup	Forfar Athletic	4 – 1	Montrose
Glasgow Cup	Celtic	2 – 1 (Note: Second replay needed.)	Rangers
Lanarkshire Cup	Motherwell	4 – 2	Wishaw Thistle
Linlithgowshire Cup	Broxburn	4 – 1	Broxburn Athletic
North of Scotland Cup	Forres Mechanics	3 – 2	Inverness Thistle
Perthshire Cup	St Johnstone	5 – 1	Vale of Teith
Renfrewshire Cup	Morton	4 – 0 (Note: Aggregate over two legs.)	Johnstone
Southern Counties Cup	Maxwelltown Volunteers	5 – 1	Dalbeattie Star
Stirlingshire Cup	Alloa Athletic	1 – 0	East Stirling

=== Non-league honours ===
Highland League

Top Three
Pos	Team	Pld	W	D	L	GF	GA	GD	Pts
1	Clachnacuddin	12	10	1	1	30	15	+15	21
2	Highland Light Infantry	11	6	3	2	29	16	+13	15
3	Inverness Citadel	12	5	4	3	19	18	+1	14

Source: SFHA

Other Senior Leagues

Division	Winner
Border Senior League	Vale of Leithen
Northern League	Brechin City
Perthshire League	Stanley
Scottish Combination	Galston
Scottish Union	Bathgate

== Scotland national team ==
Scotland were joint winners of the 1908 British Home Championship with England.

Date	Venue	Opponents	Score (Note: Scotland's score is shown first.)	Competition	Scotland scorer(s)
7 March 1908	Dens Park, Dundee (H)	Wales	2–1	BHC	Willie Lennie, Alex Bennett
14 March 1908	Dalymount Park, Dublin (A)	Ireland	5–0	BHC	Jimmy Quinn (4), James Galt
4 April 1908	Hampden Park, Glasgow (H)	England	1–1	BHC	Andrew Wilson

Key:

- (H) = Home match
- (A) = Away match
- BHC = British Home Championship

Team	Pld	W	D	L	GF	GA	GD	Pts
England (C)	3	2	1	0	11	3	+8	5
Scotland (C)	3	2	1	0	8	2	+6	5
Ireland	3	1	0	2	2	8	−6	2
Wales	3	0	0	3	2	10	−8	0

Rules for classification: 1) points. The points system worked as follows: 2 points for a win and 1 point for a draw.
(C) Co-champions

== Other national teams ==
=== Scottish League XI ===
Date	Venue	Opponents	Score (Note: Scottish League XI's score is shown first.)	Scotland scorer(s)
29 February 1908	Villa Park, Birmingham (A)	(England) Football League XI	0–2	

== See also ==
- 1907–08 Aberdeen F.C. season
