= James Young (footballer, born 1882) =

Scottish footballer

Personal information
- Date of birth: 10 January 1882
- Place of birth: Kilmarnock, Scotland
- Date of death: 4 September 1922 (aged 40)
- Place of death: Hurlford, Scotland
- Position: Right half

Youth career
- Dean Park
- Kilmarnock Rugby XI

Senior career*
Years	Team	Apps	(Gls)
–	Stewarton		
–	Kilmarnock Shawbank		
1901–1902	Barrow		
1902–1903	Bristol Rovers		
1903–1917	Celtic	392	(15)

International career
1904–1911	Scottish League XI	6	(0)
1906	Scotland	1	(0)
- * Club domestic league appearances and goals

James Young (10 January 1882 – 4 September 1922) was a Scottish football player, best known for playing as a right half for the highly successful Celtic side of the early 1900s. Young helped Celtic to win fifteen major trophies in total, comprising nine league championships and six Scottish Cups. His career was ended by a knee injury suffered in 1916.

Young made one appearance for the Scotland national football team, against Ireland in 1906. He also represented the Scottish League XI six times.

He died in a motorcycle accident in his native Ayrshire, aged 40.

In October 2013, a biography "Sunny Jim Young - Celtic Legend" written by David W. Potter was published.

== Honours ==
Celtic

- Scottish League: 1904–05, 1905–06, 1906–07, 1907–08, 1908–09, 1909–10, 1913–14, 1914–15, 1915–16
- Scottish Cup: 1903–04, 1906–07, 1907–08, 1910–11, 1911–12, 1913–14
- Glasgow Cup: 1904–05, 1905–06, 1906–07, 1907–08, 1909–10, 1915–16
