= Harry Clements =

Harry Clements may refer to:

- Harry R. Clements (born 1929), American engineer and businessman
- Harry Clements (footballer) (1883–1939), English footballer
