= James Cunningham (footballer) =

Scottish footballer

Personal information
- Full name: James Cunningham
- Date of birth: 1886
- Place of birth: Dennistoun, Scotland
- Position: Forward

Senior career*
Years	Team	Apps	(Gls)
–	Cambuslang Rangers		
–	Cambuslang Hibernian		
1904–1911	St Mirren	163	(52)
1911–1912	Kilmarnock	25	(6)
1912	→ Galston (loan)		
1912–1914	Cowdenbeath	40	(10)
1914–1915	Airdrieonians	4	(0)
Total		232	(68)
- * Club domestic league appearances and goals

James Cunningham (born 1886) was a Scottish footballer who played as a forward, primarily for St Mirren and for others including Kilmarnock and Cowdenbeath.

== Career ==
=== Club ===
Cunningham joined St Mirren in 1904 after playing in the junior leagues as a teenager. He spent seven years with the Paisley club and took part in the 1908 Scottish Cup Final, scoring his team's goal in a 5–1 defeat to Celtic. In his last season with the Buddies, 1910–11, he was joined by his younger brother Robert and enjoyed his best goalscoring run (18 in 33 matches), but departed at its end to sign for Kilmarnock.

At Rugby Park his colleagues included another set of Cunningham siblings, Andy – who became one of the leading Scottish players of the era – and William, who were not related to James. He fell out of favour after a year, serving a short loan at Galston before moving to second-tier Cowdenbeath where he played for two seasons, helping them gain promotion as winners of 1913–14 Scottish Division Two in the second. He then joined Airdrieonians a few months before the outbreak of World War I, and although the Scottish League continued unlike most competitions, Cunningham is only recorded as making four appearances for the Diamonds.

At representative level, he played in the Home Scots v Anglo-Scots annual trial match on three occasions: 1907, 1908 and 1911. With Bobby Walker and Jimmy McMenemy established in Cunningham's preferred position of inside right and numerous alternatives in the centre of attack, in each of the trials he played at inside left, a role where several players were capped for Scotland a few times in the period. Cunningham received praise in newspaper reports for his performance in each match but the 'Home' team failed to score in any of them and he was never selected for his country in a full international.
