= James Bennett (Scottish footballer) =

Scottish footballer (1891–1955)

Personal information
- Full name: James Bryce Bennett
- Date of birth: 28 May 1891
- Place of birth: Rutherglen, Scotland
- Date of death: 24 October 1955 (aged 64)
- Place of death: Hillhead, Scotland
- Position: Outside forward

Senior career*
Years	Team	Apps	(Gls)
1910–1914	Queen's Park	6	(0)
- * Club domestic league appearances and goals

James Bryce Bennett (28 May 1891 – 24 October 1955) was a Scottish amateur footballer who played as an outside forward in the Scottish League for Queen's Park.

== Personal life ==
Bennett's older brother Alec was also a footballer who won League championships with both Celtic and Rangers, and was a Scottish international. Their father Robert was a master draper and amateur poet of some local esteem whose portrait is on display in a Hamilton museum.

In November 1914, three months after Britain's entry into the First World War, Bennett enlisted in the Highland Light Infantry. On 1 July 1916, the first day of the Battle of the Somme, younger brother Robert (a private in the same regiment) was killed. Two weeks later on 15 July, while holding the rank of sergeant, James Bennett received a gunshot wound to the back, but survived. He later worked as a textile manufacturer and died of stomach cancer in 1955, age 64.

== Career statistics ==
Appearances and goals by club, season and competition
Club	Season	League			Scottish Cup		Other		Total	
Club	Season	Division	Apps	Goals	Apps	Goals	Apps	Goals	Apps	Goals
Queen's Park	1909–10	Scottish First Division	3	0	0	0	0	0	3	0
Queen's Park	1910–11	Scottish First Division	1	0	0	0	1 (Note: Appearances in Glasgow Merchants Charity Cup.)	0	2	0
Queen's Park	1913–14	Scottish First Division	2	0	0	0	0	0	2	0
Career total			6	0	0	0	1	0	7	0
