= Tom Sinclair (footballer) =

Scottish footballer (1880–1968)

Personal information
- Full name: Thomas Smith Sinclair
- Date of birth: 1880
- Place of birth: Dunkeld, Scotland
- Date of death: 1968 (aged 87–88)
- Place of death: Bonhill, Scotland
- Position: Goalkeeper

Senior career*
Years	Team	Apps	(Gls)
1900–1902	Rutherglen Glencairn		
1902–1904	Morton		
1904–1907	Rangers	46	(0)
1906	→ Celtic (loan)	6	(0)
1907–1913	Newcastle United	8	(0)
1912	Dumbarton Harp		
1913–1916	Dunfermline Athletic	6	(0)
1916–1917	Stevenston United		
1917	→ Kilmarnock (loan)	3	(0)
- * Club domestic league appearances and goals

Thomas Smith Sinclair (1880 – 1968) was a Scottish footballer who played as a goalkeeper at the start of the 20th century.

== Career ==
Sinclair began his career with Rutherglen Glencairn, winning the Scottish Junior Cup and Glasgow Junior League in 1902 alongside future Scotland internationals Jimmy McMenemy and Alec Bennett. He then joined Morton.

He joined Rangers in 1904 and played there for nearly three seasons. He spent much of his time at Ibrox as a reserve, but eventually made 73 first-team appearances. He played in the 1905 Scottish Cup Final and in the Scottish Football League championship play-off match of the same year, but finished on the losing side in both.

He also spent several weeks on loan at Celtic in 1906. At the start of the 1906–07 season, the Celtic goalkeeper Davey Adams cut his hand during a benefit match at Ibrox – the injury was caused by a nail which had been inserted through a goal-post for a five-a-side tournament – and as a gesture of goodwill, Rangers loaned Sinclair (who had lost his starting place to Alex Newbigging) to Celtic whilst Adams recovered from injury, and this is the first known transfer between the two Old Firm clubs. Sinclair played six league fixtures and three Glasgow Cup ties for Celtic, keeping clean sheets in every match bar his final game, where Celtic won 3–2 in the Glasgow Cup final.

He joined Newcastle United in 1907. Again, he was used mainly as a reserve and made only eight first-team appearances in five years on Tyneside. In these games he kept three clean sheets, conceded three goals and lost only one match. During Sinclair's spell at Newcastle the club won the English First Division twice and the FA Cup once (as well as reaching two further finals), but he was unable to displace fellow Glaswegian Jimmy Lawrence (the Magpies' all-time record appearance record holder) for long enough to claim any medals.

He later returned to Scotland and played for clubs including Dunfermline Athletic and Kilmarnock, but again was never the first choice in his position.

== Personal life ==
Sinclair served in the British Army during the First World War.

== Honours ==
Rutherglen Glencairn

- Scottish Junior Cup: 1901–02

Rangers

- Scottish Cup: Runner-up: 1904–05
- Glasgow Merchants Charity Cup: 1905–06

Celtic

- Glasgow Cup: 1906–07

== See also ==
- Played for Celtic and Rangers
