= Jimmy Quinn (footballer, born 1878) =

Scottish footballer

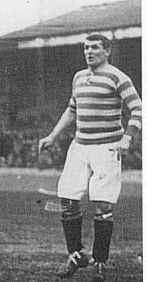
- Quinn in action for Celtic, 1912

Personal information
- Date of birth: 8 July 1878
- Place of birth: Croy, Scotland
- Date of death: 21 November 1945 (aged 67)
- Place of death: Croy, Scotland
- Height: 1.74 m (5 ft 9 in)
- Position: Centre forward

Senior career*
Years	Team	Apps	(Gls)
- Smithston Albion
1900–1915	Celtic	272	(188)

International career
1904–1912	Scottish League XI	8	(8)
1905–1912	Scotland	11	(7)
- * Club domestic league appearances and goals

James Quinn (8 July 1878 – 21 November 1945) was a Scottish footballer who played for Celtic for 15 years, becoming one of the club's leading goalscorers of all time. He also represented Scotland.

== Career ==
=== Club ===
A native of the village of Croy, North Lanarkshire and signed for Celtic aged 22 by Willie Maley from junior club Smithston Albion in 1900, Quinn took several seasons to make his mark, playing at outside-left then inside-left before being moved to centre. Like so many players of the time and since, he was a coal miner.

A man who was strong and powerful in stature but shy and unassuming in character, the foundations of Quinn's enduring fame were laid with a hat-trick in the 1902 British League Cup final against Old Firm rivals Rangers, and cemented in the 1904 Scottish Cup Final against the same opposition. At half-time Rangers led by two goals to nil. In the second half, however, Celtic came back to win 3–2, Quinn scoring all the goals. This was the second hat-trick in a Scottish Cup Final; it was 68 years before the feat was repeated by Dixie Deans in Celtic's 6–1 defeat of Hibs in 1972. That cup final hat-trick was the first a Celtic player scored against Rangers in a major competition, and Quinn also scored the second, in a 3–0 league victory on New Year's Day 1912. He was the only player from either side to have twice scored a hat-trick in an Old Firm match until Ally McCoist emulated him in the 1980s. (Note: McCoist scored all three goals in Rangers' Glasgow Cup final victory in May 1986 to add to the treble he'd netted against Celtic in the League Cup final two years earlier.)

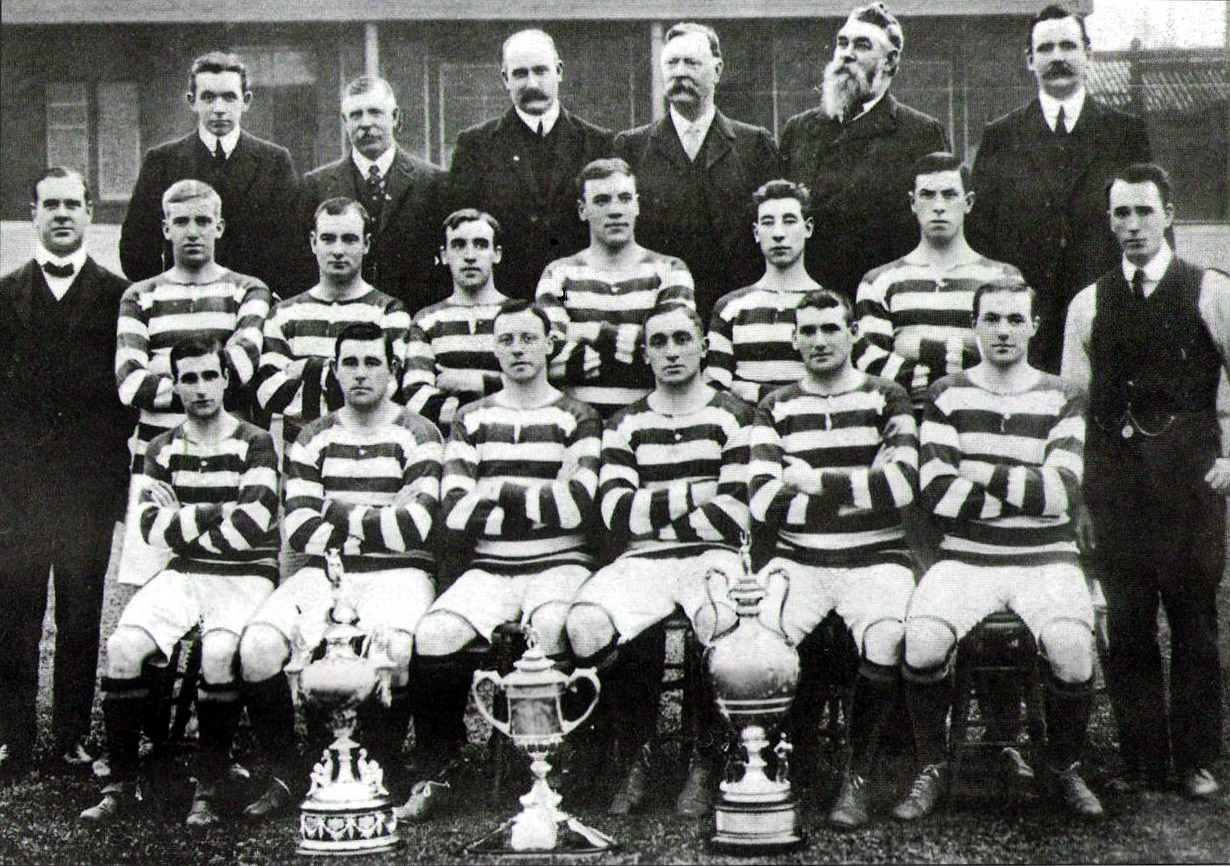
1908 Celtic team photo with the Glasgow Merchants Charity Cup, Scottish Cup and Glasgow Cup trophies; Quinn is bottom row, second from right

Quinn won six successive championship and five Scottish Cup medals with Celtic as the focal point of a forward line which became well known across the country: Bennett, McMenemy, Quinn, Somers and Hamilton. He scored 218 goals in 331 appearances in the two major competitions – 188 in the League (273 appearances including a playoff in 1905) and 30 in the Scottish Cup from 58 appearances, eight of them in finals (1904, 1908, 1909, and 1911), plus dozens more in various minor tournaments. (Note: Source includes tallies for the Glasgow Cup (21 in 38) but not the Glasgow Merchants Charity Cup, Inter City Football League, British League Cup or Benefit Tournament.)

His strike rate of 0.65 – almost two goals every three games – is surpassed among Celtic goalscorers only by Jimmy McGrory, Henrik Larsson and Sandy McMahon. As a scorer of league goals, his total of 187 is behind McGrory alone. Quinn was the first Celtic player to score 200 goals for the club, and only four others have done so—McGrory, Bobby Lennox (273), Larsson (242), and Stevie Chalmers (228). Ninety years after his retirement, he remains the club's fifth highest goalscorer.

He received a benefit match in 1926, in which Celtic played against a Scottish League team, ending in a 3–3 draw.

His grandson of the same name also played for Celtic.

=== International ===
Quinn scored seven goals in 11 appearances for Scotland including four out of five goals against Ireland in 1908, and eight in as many games for the Scottish League XI.

== Honours ==
- Scottish League (6): 1904–05, 1905–06, 1906–07, 1907–08, 1908–09, 1909–10 (Note: Did not play sufficient games in 1913–14 (1) or 1914–15 (6) to be credited with honour)
- Scottish Cup: (5) 1903–04, 1906–07, 1907–08, 1910–11, 1911–12
  - Finalist: 1908–09 (Note: No cup awarded due to rioting by fans after the replayed final)
- British League Cup: 1901–02
- Glasgow Cup: 1904–05, 1905–06, 1906–07, 1907–08, 1909–10

== See also ==
- List of Scotland national football team hat-tricks
