= Robert Maxwell (footballer) =

Scottish footballer

Personal information
- Full name: Robert Maxwell
- Place of birth: Scotland
- Position: Centre half

Senior career*
Years	Team	Apps	(Gls)
1891–1892	Kilmarnock Athletic		
1892–1894	Darwen	35	(2)
Total		35	(2)
- * Club domestic league appearances and goals

Robert Maxwell was a Scottish footballer who played in the Football League for Darwen (making the move south along with Michael McAvoy).
