= Michael McAvoy =

Scottish footballer

Personal information
- Date of birth: 1871
- Place of birth: Kilmarnock, Scotland
- Date of death: 1950 (aged 78–79)
- Place of death: Paisley, Scotland
- Position: Left half

Senior career*
| Years | Team | Apps | (Gls) |
| – | Kilmarnock Athletic | | |
| 1891–1896 | Darwen | 94 | (7) |
| 1896–1909 | St Mirren | 263 | (10) |
| 1909–1910 | Abercorn | 3 | (0) |
- * Club domestic league appearances and goals

Michael McAvoy (1871–1950) was a Scottish footballer who played as a left half, featuring for Darwen in England's Football League (making the move south along with Robert Maxwell), then for St Mirren and Abercorn in the Scottish Football League. He made over 300 appearances for St Mirren over 13 years with the Paisley club, including the 1908 Scottish Cup Final, a defeat at the hands of Celtic – after four losses at the semi-final stage of the competition in previous years.
