= Alex Bennett (footballer) =

Scottish footballer & manager (1881–1940)

Alec Bennett
Personal information
- Full name: Alexander Bennett
- Date of birth: 20 September 1881
- Place of birth: Rutherglen, Scotland
- Date of death: 9 January 1940 (aged 58)
- Place of death: Glasgow, Scotland
- Positions: Outside right; centre forward

Youth career
- Rutherglen Woodburn

Senior career*
Years	Team	Apps	(Gls)
1901–1903	Rutherglen Glencairn		
1903–1908	Celtic	124	(47)
1908–1919	Rangers	188	(51)
1918–1919	→ Ayr United (loan)		
1919–1920	Dumbarton	43	(8)
1920–1921	Albion Rovers	30	(3)

International career
1904–1913	Scotland	11	(2)
1905–1912	Scottish League XI	10	(0)

Managerial career
- 1921–1924: Third Lanark
- 1924–1926: Clydebank
- * Club domestic league appearances and goals

Alexander Bennett (20 September 1881 – 9 January 1940) was a Scottish footballer who played for Celtic, Rangers and the Scotland national team.

A small right-winger, he was described in contemporary reports as "...a veritable artful dodger with rare speed and command of the ball."

== Career ==
=== Club ===
Born in Rutherglen, Bennett began his career at his local club Rutherglen Glencairn in 1901, at which time future Celtic colleague Jimmy McMenemy was also with the outfit. In 1902 Bennett was selected for the Scotland Junior team for matches along with another man who would soon be a teammate at Celtic, Davie Hamilton, scoring four goals in as many Junior internationals overall.

Having won the Scottish Junior Cup and Glasgow Junior League double with Glencairn in 1902, Bennett was persuaded by McMenemy to sign for Celtic in May 1903; Bennett became a fixture in the side which won the Scottish Football League title for four consecutive years between 1905 and 1908. In the latter two years of this streak Bennett also collected Scottish Cup winner's medals. He initially played as centre-forward for Celtic, but shifted positions to accommodate Jimmy Quinn which proved beneficial to both players.

In May 1908, Bennett abruptly left Celtic (winners of every trophy on offer that season) to join rivals Rangers, who met a small contract release fee – £50, equivalent to under £5000 in the 2010s – to allow him to move as a free agent, making him one of very few players to have moved directly from one club to the other. He had scored the winning goal in an Old Firm league meeting between the sides just two weeks earlier to clinch the title for Celtic.

He won a further three consecutive League Championships while at Ibrox (1911 to 1913) and remained with the club until 1918, also serving in the Cameronians (Scottish Rifles) during World War I. He played in a combined total of 351 league and cup matches for Celtic and Rangers, scoring 116 goals.

After leaving Rangers, Bennett played on until his fortieth birthday, with firstly a loan to Ayr United, then permanent transfers to Dumbarton and Albion Rovers. He was later manager of Third Lanark (three seasons) and Clydebank (two seasons), and also worked as a sports journalist. He died in Glasgow in 1940.

=== International ===
Bennett was capped eleven times for Scotland, gaining three caps while at Celtic and the remaining eight while at Rangers. He made his Scotland debut against Wales in March 1904 and scored his first international goal, again against Wales, four years later. He scored his second international goal in his final Scotland appearance, against Ireland in March 1913. He also appeared ten times in representative matches for the Scottish Football League.

At the age of 39 he also took part in a 1921 summer tour of North America as a member of 'Third Lanark Scotland XI' (organised by Third Lanark and composed of players from seven different clubs), reuniting with old teammate and rival Jimmy McMenemy; Bennett thereafter became the Thirds manager, leading their next expedition to South America in 1923.

== Personal life ==
Bennett's younger brother James was also a footballer who played for Queen's Park prior to being wounded on military service in World War I; another brother Robert was killed in the conflict. Their father, also Robert, was a master draper and amateur poet of some local esteem whose portrait is on display in a Hamilton museum. Alec was clearly proud to be associated with his family business: when he married in 1910 he listed that he was a 'Drapery warehouseman' by profession rather than an international footballer.

His grandson Sandy Carmichael (full name Alexander Bennett Carmichael) played international Rugby union for Scotland and the British and Irish Lions in the 1970s.

== Honours ==
Rutherglen Glencairn

- Scottish Junior Cup: 1901–02
- Glasgow Junior League: 1901–02

Celtic

- Scottish League: 1904–05, 1905–06, 1906–07, 1907–08
- Scottish Cup: 1906–07, 1907–08
- Glasgow Cup: 1904–05, 1905–06, 1907–08

Rangers

- Scottish League: 1910–11, 1911–12, 1912–13 (Note: Did not play during 1917–18, although still registered with the club)
- Scottish Cup: Finalist 1908–09 (Note: No cup awarded due to rioting by fans after the replayed final)
- Glasgow Cup: 1910–11, 1911–12, 1912–13, 1913–14

== See also ==
- Played for Celtic and Rangers
