= James Mitchell (footballer, born 1880) =

Scottish footballer

Personal information
- Date of birth: 21 January 1880
- Place of birth: Gatehead, Scotland
- Date of death: 1 April 1958 (aged 78)
- Place of death: Kilmarnock, Scotland
- Position: Left back

Senior career*
Years	Team	Apps	(Gls)
–	Crosshouse		
1900–1920	Kilmarnock	410	(7)
1905–1907	→ Hurlford (loan)		
Total		410	(7)

International career
1908–1910	Scotland	3	(0)
1910	Scottish League XI	1	(0)
- * Club domestic league appearances and goals

James Mitchell (21 January 1880 – 1 April 1958) was a Scottish footballer, who played for Kilmarnock and Scotland.
