= Robert Carmichael (footballer) =

Scottish footballer

Personal information
- Full name: Robert Carmichael
- Date of birth: 1885
- Place of birth: Paisley, Scotland
- Position: Full back

Youth career
- Baillieston

Senior career*
Years	Team	Apps	(Gls)
1906–1907	Sunderland		
1908–1909	St Mirren	16	(3)
1909–1910	Oldham Athletic		
1910–1912	Third Lanark	39	(11)
1911–1919	Clyde	35	(11)
1918–1919	Dumbarton	6	(2)
- * Club domestic league appearances and goals

Robert Carmichael (born 1885) was a Scottish footballer who played for Sunderland, St Mirren, Oldham Athletic, Third Lanark, Clyde and Dumbarton.
