= Peter Somers =

Scottish footballer

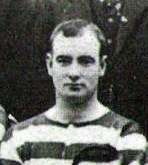

Personal information
- Date of birth: 3 June 1878
- Place of birth: Strathaven, Scotland
- Date of death: 27 November 1914 (aged 36)
- Place of death: Glasgow, Scotland
- Height: 5 ft 8 in (1.73 m)
- Position: Inside forward

Youth career
- Mossend Celtic
- Cadzow Oak

Senior career*
Years	Team	Apps	(Gls)
1897	Hamilton Academical	2	(0)
1897–1910	Celtic	186	(52)
1899	→ Clyde (loan)	6	(3)
1900	→ Blackburn Rovers (loan)	(Note: He made 76 Football League appearances for Blackburn over two loan spells (13 goals), but the breakdown of these is not confirmed.)	
1900–1902	→ Blackburn Rovers (loan)		
1910–1911	Hamilton Academical	23	(2)
Total		293	(70)

International career
1899–1909	Scottish League XI	3	(0)
1905–1909	Scotland	4	(0)
- * Club domestic league appearances and goals

Peter Somers (3 June 1878 – 27 November 1914) was a Scottish footballer who played as an inside forward for Celtic, Blackburn Rovers, Hamilton Academical and Scotland. Somers also played for the Scottish Football League XI three times. After retiring as a player, Somers became a director of Hamilton Academical.

== Personal life ==
Somers became seriously ill in November 1914, requiring his left foot to be amputated. He died of complications from this operation on 27 November. His son Billy Somers, also a footballer, was a Dominion of Canada Football Champion with Toronto Scottish in 1932, while another son John played briefly for Hearts.

== Honours ==
Celtic

- Scottish Division One: 1904–05, 1905–06, 1906–07, 1907–08, 1908–09
- Scottish Cup: 1903–04, 1906–07, 1907–08
- Glasgow Cup: 1904–05, 1905–06, 1906–07, 1907–08
- Glasgow Merchants Charity Cup: 1902–03
