= 1911–12 Scottish Cup =

Tournament details
- Country: Scotland

Final positions
- Champions: Celtic
- Runners-up: Clyde

The 1911–12 Scottish Cup was the 39th staging of Scotland's most prestigious football knockout competition. The Cup was won by Celtic who defeated Clyde in the final.

== Semi-finals ==
9 March 1912

Clyde	3–1	Third Lanark

Attendance: 30,000

30 March 1912

Celtic	3–0	Hearts

Attendance: 40,000

== Final ==
6 April 1912

Celtic	2–0	Clyde
Gallacher; McMenemy

Ibrox Park, Glasgow
Attendance: 50,000
Referee: T. Dougray

=== Teams ===
Celtic:
GK	John Mulrooney
RB	Alec McNair
LB	Joe Dodds
RH	James Young
CH	Willie Loney
LH	Peter Johnstone
OR	Andrew McAtee
IR	Patsy Gallacher
CF	Jimmy Quinn
IL	Jimmy McMenemy
OL	John Brown

Clyde:
GK	James Grant
RB	John Gilligan
LB	Jimmy Blair
RH	William Walker
CH	Willie McAndrew
LH	Harry Collins
OR	James Hamilton
IR	John Jackson
CF	William Morrison
IL	Robert Carmichael
OL	Thomas Stevens

== See also ==
1911–12 in Scottish football
