= William Agnew (footballer) =

Scottish footballer (1880–1936)

Willie Agnew
Personal information
- Full name: William Barbour Agnew
- Date of birth: 30 December 1880
- Place of birth: Kilmarnock, Scotland
- Date of death: 19 August 1936 (aged 55)
- Place of death: Moffat, Scotland
- Position: Defender

Senior career*
Years	Team	Apps	(Gls)
1899–1902	Kilmarnock	22	(0)
1902–1904	Newcastle United	43	(0)
1904–1906	Middlesbrough		
1906–1908	Kilmarnock	56	(10)
1908–1910	Sunderland	28	(0)
1910–1913	Falkirk	38	(5)
1913–1914	East Stirlingshire	16	(4)

International career
1907–1908	Scotland	3	(0)
1907–1908	Scottish League XI	2	(0)
- * Club domestic league appearances and goals

William Barbour Agnew (30 December 1880 – 19 August 1936) was a Scottish footballer who played for local club Kilmarnock and Falkirk as well as English clubs Newcastle United, Middlesbrough and Sunderland.

Agnew, a defender born in Kilmarnock, was also capped by the Scotland national team, making three appearances between 1907 and 1908. He coached at Third Lanark after his playing career.
