= 1907–08 Scottish Cup =

Tournament details
- Country: Scotland

Final positions
- Champions: Celtic
- Runners-up: St Mirren

The 1907–08 Scottish Cup was the 35th season of Scotland's most prestigious football knockout competition. The Cup was won by Celtic when they beat St Mirren 5–1.

== Calendar ==
Round	First match date	Fixtures	Clubs
First Round	25 January 1908	16	32 → 16
Second Round	8 February 1908	8	16 → 8
Quarter-finals	22 February 1908	4	8 → 4
Semi-finals	21/28 March 1908	2	4 → 2
Final	18 April 1908	1	2 → 1

== First round ==
Home team	Score	Away team
Aberdeen	5 – 3	Albion Rovers
Airdrieonians	0 – 1	Dundee
Celtic	4 – 0	Peebles Rovers
Dumfries	0 – 4	Motherwell
Dunblane	8 – 3	Elgin City
Falkirk	2 – 2	Rangers
Galston	6 – 0	Uphall
Heart of Midlothian	4 – 1	St Johnstone
Hibernian	5 – 0	Abercorn
Kilmarnock	2 – 1	Hamilton Academical
Morton	7 – 0	Vale of Atholl
Partick Thistle	4 – 0	Bo'ness
Port Glasgow Athletic	7 – 2	Ayr Parkhouse
Raith Rovers	2 – 0	Inverness Thistle
St Bernard's	1 – 1	Queen's Park
St Mirren	3 – 1	Third Lanark

=== Replays ===
Home team	Score	Away team
Queen's Park	1 – 1	St Bernard's
Rangers	4 – 1	Falkirk

=== Second Replay ===
Home team	Score	Away team
Queen's Park	1 – 0	St Bernard's

Match played at Cathkin Park

== Second round ==
Home team	Score	Away team
Aberdeen	0 – 0	Dundee
Heart of Midlothian	4 – 0	Port Glasgow Athletic
Hibernian	3 – 0	Morton
Kilmarnock	3 – 0	Dunblane
Motherwell	2 – 2	St Mirren
Partick Thistle	1 – 1	Raith Rovers
Queen's Park	6 – 2	Galston
Rangers	1 – 2	Celtic

=== Replays ===
Home team	Score	Away team
Dundee	2 – 2	Aberdeen
Raith Rovers	2 – 1	Partick Thistle
St Mirren	2 – 0	Motherwell

=== Second Replay ===
Home team	Score	Away team
Aberdeen	3 – 1	Dundee

Match played at Hampden Park

== Quarter-finals ==
Home team	Score	Away team
Aberdeen	3 – 1	Queen's Park
Hibernian	0 – 1	Kilmarnock
Raith Rovers	0 – 3	Celtic
St Mirren	3 – 1	Heart of Midlothian

== Semi-finals ==
21 March 1908

Aberdeen	0–1	Celtic

28 March 1908

Kilmarnock	0–0	St Mirren

=== Replay ===
11 April 1908

St Mirren	2–0	Kilmarnock

== Final ==
18 April 1908

Celtic	5–1	St Mirren
Bennett 10' 48'; Quinn 36'; Hamilton 61'; Somers 85'		Cunningham

Hampden Park, Glasgow
Attendance: 58,000
Referee: J. Ferguson

=== Teams ===
Celtic:
GK	Davey Adams
RB	Alec McNair
LB	Jimmy Weir
RH	James Young
CH	Willie Loney
LH	Jimmy Hay
OR	Alec Bennett
IR	Jimmy McMenemy
CF	Jimmy Quinn
IL	Peter Somers
OL	Davie Hamilton

St Mirren:
GK	James Grant
RB	Dan Gordon
LB	David White
RH	William Key
CH	Robert Robertson
LH	Michael McAvoy
OR	Harry Clements
IR	James Cunningham
CF	David Wyllie
IL	Tom Paton
OL	Andrew Anderson

== See also ==
- 1907–08 in Scottish football
