= 1903–04 Scottish Cup =

Tournament details
- Country: Scotland

Final positions
- Champions: Celtic
- Runners-up: Rangers

The 1903–04 Scottish Cup was the 31st season of Scotland's most prestigious football knockout competition. The cup was won by Celtic when they beat holders Rangers 3–2 in the final at the newly built Hampden Park to claim the trophy for a fourth time. The fixture may have been the point when the 'Old Firm' term began to be used in media to denote the relationship between the clubs, due to the increasing frequency of their meetings and the mutual commercial benefits of the growing rivalry.

== Calendar ==
Round	First match date	Fixtures	Clubs
First round	28 January 1904	16	32 → 16
Second round	6 February 1904	8	16 → 8
Quarter-finals	20 February 1904	4	8 → 4
Semi-finals	5 March 1904	2	4 → 2
Final	16 April 1904	1	2 → 1

== First round ==
Home team	Score	Away team
Abercorn	2 – 2	Maxwelltown Volunteers
Albion Rovers	2 – 1	Kilwinning Eglinton
Alloa Athletic	2 – 1	Aberdeen
Ayr	0 – 2	St Mirren
Celtic	Walkover	Stanley
Clyde	2 – 2	Arbroath
Dundee	3 – 0	Queen's Park
Hibernian	2 – 1	Airdrieonians
Greenock Morton	8 – 1	6th GRV
Motherwell	2 – 1	Partick Thistle
Nithsdale Wanderers	2 – 2	Kilmarnock
Port Glasgow Athletic	1 – 2	Leith Athletic
Rangers	3 – 2	Heart of Midlothian
St Bernard's	1 – 1	West Calder Swifts
St Johnstone	2 – 0	Hearts of Beath
Third Lanark	Walkover	Newton Stewart

=== First round replay ===
Home team	Score	Away team
Arbroath	4 – 0	Clyde
Kilmarnock	1 – 1	Nithsdale Wanderers
Maxwelltown Volunteers	1 – 1	Abercorn
West Calder Swifts	3 – 3	St Bernard's

=== Second round replay ===
Home team	Score	Away team
Abercorn	2 – 1	Maxwelltown Volunteers
Kilmarnock	2 – 1	Nithsdale Wanderers
St Bernard's	2 – 0	West Calder Swifts

== Second round ==
Home team	Score	Away team
Dundee	4 –0	Abercorn
Hibernian	1 – 2	Rangers
Kilmarnock	2 – 2	Albion Rovers
Leith Athletic	3 – 1	Motherwell
Greenock Morton	2 – 0	Arbroath
St Bernard's	0 – 4	Celtic
St Mirren	4 – 0	St Johnstone
Third Lanark	3 – 1	Alloa Athletic

=== Second round replay ===
Home team	Score	Away team
Albion Rovers	0 – 1	Kilmarnock

== Quarter-final ==
Home team	Score	Away team
Celtic	1 – 1	Dundee
Leith Athletic	1 – 3	Greenock Morton
St Mirren	0 – 1	Rangers
Third Lanark	3 – 0	Kilmarnock

=== Quarter-final replay ===
Home team	Score	Away team
Dundee	0 – 0	Celtic

=== Quarter-final second replay ===
Home team	Score	Away team
Celtic	5 – 0	Dundee

== Semi-finals ==
Home team	Score	Away team
Celtic	2 – 1	Third Lanark
Rangers	3 – 0	Greenock Morton

== Final ==
16 April 1904

Celtic	3–2	Rangers
Quinn		Speedie

Hampden Park
Attendance: 64,472

=== Teams ===
Celtic:
GK	Davey Adams
RB	Donald McLeod
LB	Willie Orr
RH	James Young
CH	Willie Loney
LH	Jimmy Hay
OR	Bobby Muir
IR	Jimmy McMenemy
CF	Jimmy Quinn
IL	Peter Somers
OL	Davie Hamilton

Rangers:
GK	John Watson
RB	Nicol Smith
LB	Jock Drummond
RH	George Henderson
CH	James Stark
LH	John Robertson
OR	Johnny Walker
IR	Finlay Speedie
CF	Alec Mackie
IL	Charles Donaghy
OL	Alex Smith

== See also ==
- 1903–04 in Scottish football
