= 1904–05 Scottish Division One =

12th season of top-tier football league in Scotland

Scottish Division One
- Season: 1904–05
- Champions: Celtic; 5th title
- Matches: 182
- Goals: 583 (3.2 per match)
- Top goalscorer: Robert Hamilton; Jimmy Quinn (19 goals each)

The 1904–05 Scottish Division One season was won by Celtic. Celtic and Rangers had finished the league campaign level on 41 points, and a play-off at Hampden Park (doubling up as a fixture in the minor Glasgow Football League) was arranged to decide the championship. An English-based referee was drafted in to officiate at the match due to increasing tensions between the two groups of supporters and controversies in recent matches between the sides. Celtic won 2–1, with Jimmy McMenemy and Davie Hamilton scoring the decisive goals.

The 'Old firm' clubs (a term recently employed for the growing commercial draw of the frequent fixtures between them) had already been involved in two other unusual matches during that season:

- The pivotal New Year's Day fixture at Ibrox had to be abandoned in the second half – the unexpectedly large crowd in attendance (estimated at 70,000) was cleared from the pitch to allow play to start, but spectators continued to spill on at regular intervals, with the contemporary report noting that "the game assumed a farcical order" as a result. the match was eventually played to a conclusion on 18 February 1905, with Celtic winning 4–1.
- The Scottish Cup semi-final between the clubs, played at Celtic Park on 25 March, was abandoned on 80 minutes with Rangers two goals ahead when supporters invaded the field and confronted the referee after Celtic striker Jimmy Quinn had been sent off for violent conduct. The opponent he was accused of kicking, Alex Craig, offered a statement exonerating Quinn but the Scottish Football Association imposed a one-month ban – however, Celtic had already completed all their league fixtures, and by the time of the play-off Quinn had served the ban and took part in the match.

== League table ==
Pos	Team	Pld	W	D	L	GF	GA	GD	Pts	Qualification or relegation
=1	Celtic (C)	26	18	5	3	68	31	+37	41	Champions
=1	Rangers	26	19	3	4	83	28	+55	41	
3	Third Lanark	26	14	7	5	60	28	+32	35	
4	Airdrieonians	26	11	5	10	38	45	−7	27	
5	Hibernian	26	9	8	9	39	39	0	26	
6	Partick Thistle	26	12	2	12	36	56	−20	26	
7	Heart of Midlothian	26	11	3	12	46	44	+2	25	
8	Dundee	26	10	5	11	38	32	+6	25	
9	Kilmarnock	26	9	5	12	29	45	−16	23	
10	St Mirren	26	9	4	13	33	36	−3	22	
11	Port Glasgow Athletic	26	8	5	13	30	51	−21	21	
12	Queen's Park	26	6	8	12	28	45	−17	20	
13	Morton	26	7	4	15	27	50	−23	18	
14	Motherwell	26	6	2	18	28	53	−25	14	

Source: SPFL Archive
(C) Champions

== Results ==
Home \ Away	AIR	CEL	DND	HOM	HIB	KIL	MOR	MOT	PAR	PGA	QPA	RAN	STM	THI
Airdrieonians		1–3	2–0	3–2	1–1	1–1	3–2	3–2	3–0	2–0	0–1	2–2	1–3	1–1
Celtic	2–3		3–0	1–1	2–0	3–1	5–2	4–2	2–2	3–0	1–1	2–2	1–0	2–1
Dundee	0–1	2–1		2–0	4–1	3–0	6–1	0–0	0–1	4–0	3–0	0–3	2–0	0–0
Heart of Midlothian	6–0	2–0	3–1		1–0	1–3	2–0	4–1	0–1	2–0	2–0	0–5	3–1	4–1
Hibernian	3–2	2–2	1–1	3–0		2–1	4–0	2–0	4–0	1–1	1–1	1–2	2–0	1–1
Kilmarnock	1–0	0–3	2–1	3–2	2–1		1–0	0–2	3–2	1–1	2–1	0–4	1–0	0–0
Morton	2–0	0–1	5–1	1–0	2–2	2–1		1–0	0–1	1–0	1–1	0–2	1–3	0–0
Motherwell	1–0	2–6	0–2	0–4	1–2	2–1	0–3		1–0	0–2	1–1	0–2	3–2	0–1
Partick Thistle	0–3	0–5	2–1	2–1	0–1	2–0	3–1	1–0		3–0	3–1	1–4	0–1	3–2
Port Glasgow Athletic	1–3	1–4	1–0	3–0	1–1	1–1	2–1	2–1	6–1		4–2	0–3	0–2	1–1
Queen's Park	1–1	2–3	0–1	2–0	4–2	1–1	1–1	2–0	1–4	2–0		0–4	2–1	0–1
Rangers	4–1	1–4	2–1	1–1	4–0	6–2	5–0	3–2	8–1	5–1	5–0		2–3	3–1
St Mirren	0–1	2–3	1–1	1–1	2–0	1–0	1–0	1–2	2–2	1–2	1–1	3–0		1–2
Third Lanark	6–0	1–2	2–2	7–1	4–1	3–1	5–0	4–3	6–1	3–0	2–0	2–1	3–0	

Legend: Blue = home team win; Yellow = draw; Red = away team win.

== Championship play-off ==
6 May 1905
15:00

Celtic	2–1	Rangers
McMenemy; Hamilton		Robertson

Hampden Park, Glasgow
Attendance: 30,000
Referee: (England) Frederick Kirkham

=== Teams ===
Celtic:
GK	Davey Adams
RB	Hugh Watson
LB	Willie Orr
RH	Alec McNair
CH	Willie Loney
LH	Jimmy Hay
OR	Alec Bennett
IR	Jimmy McMenemy
CF	Jimmy Quinn
IL	Peter Somers
OL	Davie Hamilton

Rangers:
GK	Tom Sinclair
RB	Alex Fraser
LB	Alex Craig
RH	Adam Gourlay
CH	James Stark
LH	John May
OR	John Robertson
IR	Finlay Speedie
CF	Robert McColl
IL	Charles Donaghy
OL	Alex Smith

== See also ==
- 1890–91 Scottish Football League#Championship play-off
