= Harry Clements (footballer) =

English footballer

Personal information
- Full name: Harold W. Clements
- Date of birth: 22 July 1883
- Place of birth: Worcester, England
- Date of death: 1939 (aged 55–56)
- Position: Winger

Senior career*
| Years | Team | Apps | (Gls) |
| 1902–1903 | Worcester City | | |
| 1903–1904 | West Bromwich Albion | 10 | (0) |
| 1904–1905 | Worcester City | | |
| 1905–1906 | Shrewsbury Town | | |
| 1906–1911 | St Mirren | 97 | (16) |
| 1911–1912 | Third Lanark | 4 | (0) |
| Total | | 111 | (16) |
- * Club domestic league appearances and goals

Harold W. Clements (22 July 1883 – 1939) was an English footballer who played in the Football League for West Bromwich Albion.
