= 1906–07 Scottish Cup =

Tournament details
- Country: Scotland

Final positions
- Champions: Celtic
- Runners-up: Heart of Midlothian

The 1906–07 Scottish Cup was the 34th season of Scotland's most prestigious football knockout competition. The cup was won by Celtic when they beat Heart of Midlothian 3–0 in the final. Celtic also won the Scottish Football League, the first time a club claimed the national 'double'.

== Calendar ==
Round	First match date	Fixtures	Clubs
First round	26 January 1907	16	32 → 16
Second round	9 February 1907	8	16 → 8
Quarter-finals	9 March 1907	4	8 → 4
Semi-finals	30 March 1907	2	4 → 2
Final	20 April 1907	1	2 → 1

== First round ==
Home team	Score	Away team
Aberdeen	0 – 0	Johnstone
Arbroath	1 – 1	Queen's Park
Arthurlie	1 – 2	St Mirren
Ayr	2 – 0	Cowdenbeath
Celtic	2 – 1	Clyde
Dumfries	2 – 2	Port Glasgow Athletic
Falkirk	1 – 2	Rangers
Galston	2 – 2	Motherwell
Heart of Midlothian	0 – 0	Airdrieonians
Hibernian	5 – 0	Forfar Athletic
Kilmarnock	1 – 0	Inverness Clachnacuddin
Maxwelltown Volunteers	1 – 3	Greenock Morton
Partick Thistle	0 – 1	Dundee
Raith Rovers	5 – 1	Aberdeen University
Renton	0 – 0	St Bernard's
Third Lanark	4 – 1	St Johnstone

=== First round repeat ===
Home team	Score	Away team
Galston	2 – 1	Motherwell
Kilmarnock	4 – 0	Inverness Clachnacuddin
Partick Thistle	2 – 2	Dundee

=== First round replay ===
Home team	Score	Away team
Airdrieonians*	1 – 2	Heart of Midlothian
Dundee	5 – 1	Partick Thistle
Johnstone	2 – 1	Aberdeen
Port Glasgow Athletic	2 – 0	Dumfries
Queen's Park	4 – 0	Arbroath
St Bernard's	1 – 1	Renton

=== First round repeat replay ===
Home team	Score	Away team
Airdrieonians	0 – 2	Heart of Midlothian

=== First round second replay ===
Home team	Score	Away team
Renton	2 – 0	St Bernard's

== Second round ==
Home team	Score	Away team
Galston	0 –4	Rangers
Hibernian	1 – 1	Johnstone
Kilmarnock	0 – 0	Heart of Midlothian
Greenock Morton	0 – 0	Celtic
Queen's Park	3 – 1	Third Lanark
Raith Rovers	4 – 0	Ayr
Renton	1 – 0	Dundee
St Mirren	4 – 0	Port Glasgow Athletic

=== Second round replay ===
Home team	Score	Away team
Celtic	1 – 1	Greenock Morton
Heart of Midlothian	2 – 1	Kilmarnock
Johnstone	0 – 5	Hibernian

=== Second round second replay ===
Home team	Score	Away team
Celtic	2 – 1	Greenock Morton

== Quarter-final ==
Home team	Score	Away team
Heart of Midlothian	2 – 2	Raith Rovers
Hibernian	1 – 1	St Mirren
Queen's Park	4 – 1	Renton
Rangers	0 – 3	Celtic

=== Quarter-final replay ===
Home team	Score	Away team
Raith Rovers	0 – 1	Heart of Midlothian
St Mirren	1 – 1	Hibernian

=== Quarter-final second replay ===
Home team	Score	Away team
Hibernian	2 – 0	St Mirren

== Semi-finals ==
Home team	Score	Away team
Celtic	0 – 0	Hibernian
Heart of Midlothian	1 – 0	Queen's Park

=== Semi-final replay ===
Home team	Score	Away team
Hibernian	0 – 0	Celtic

=== Semi-final second replay ===
Home team	Score	Away team
Celtic	3 – 0	Hibernian

== Final ==
20 April 1907

Celtic	3–0	Heart of Midlothian
Orr (pen.); Somers

Hampden Park
Attendance: 50,000
Referee: D. Philip

=== Teams ===
Celtic:
GK	Davey Adams
RB	Donald McLeod
LB	Willie Orr
RH	James Young
CH	Willie Loney
LH	Jimmy Hay
OR	Alec Bennett
IR	Jimmy McMenemy
CF	Jimmy Quinn
IL	Peter Somers
OL	Bobby Templeton

Hearts:
GK	Tom Allan
RB	Bob Reid
LB	Tom Collins
RH	David Philip
CH	Frank McLaren
LH	William Henderson
OR	William Bauchope
IR	Bobby Walker
CF	David Axford
IL	William Yates
OL	Dick Wombwell

== See also ==
- 1906–07 in Scottish football

Finals played between same clubs:

- 1901 Scottish Cup Final
- 1956 Scottish Cup Final
- 2019 Scottish Cup Final
- 2020 Scottish Cup Final
