= 1905–06 Scottish Division One =

13th season of top-tier football league in Scotland

Scottish Division One
- Season: 1905–06
- Champions: Celtic; 6th title
- Matches: 240
- Goals: 773 (3.22 per match)
- Top goalscorer: Jimmy Quinn (20 goals)

The 1905–06 Scottish Division One season was won by Celtic by six points over nearest rival Heart of Midlothian.

== League table ==
| Pos | Team | Pld | W | D | L | GF | GA | GD | Pts | Qualification or relegation |
|---|---|---|---|---|---|---|---|---|---|---|
| 1 | Celtic (C) | 30 | 24 | 1 | 5 | 76 | 19 | +57 | 49 | Champions |
| 2 | Heart of Midlothian | 30 | 18 | 7 | 5 | 64 | 27 | +37 | 43 | |
| 3 | Airdrieonians | 30 | 15 | 8 | 7 | 53 | 31 | +22 | 38 | |
| 4 | Rangers | 30 | 15 | 7 | 8 | 58 | 48 | +10 | 37 | |
| 5 | Partick Thistle | 30 | 15 | 6 | 9 | 44 | 40 | +4 | 36 | |
| 6 | Third Lanark | 30 | 16 | 2 | 12 | 62 | 38 | +24 | 34 | |
| 7 | Dundee | 30 | 11 | 12 | 7 | 40 | 33 | +7 | 34 | |
| 8 | St Mirren | 30 | 13 | 5 | 12 | 41 | 37 | +4 | 31 | |
| 9 | Morton | 30 | 10 | 6 | 14 | 35 | 54 | −19 | 26 | |
| 10 | Motherwell | 30 | 9 | 8 | 13 | 50 | 64 | −14 | 26 | |
| 11 | Hibernian | 30 | 10 | 5 | 15 | 35 | 40 | −5 | 25 | |
| 12 | Aberdeen | 30 | 8 | 8 | 14 | 37 | 49 | −12 | 24 | |
| 13 | Falkirk | 30 | 9 | 5 | 16 | 53 | 69 | −16 | 23 | |
| 14 | Port Glasgow Athletic | 30 | 6 | 8 | 16 | 38 | 68 | −30 | 20 | |
| 15 | Kilmarnock | 30 | 8 | 4 | 18 | 46 | 68 | −22 | 20 | |
| 16 | Queen's Park | 30 | 5 | 4 | 21 | 41 | 88 | −47 | 14 | |

Source: "1905-1906 Division 1 - SPFL Archive". SPFL.
(C) Champions

== Results ==
| Home \ Away | ABE | AIR | CEL | DND | FAL | HOM | HIB | KIL | MOR | MOT | PAR | PGA | QPA | RAN | STM | THI |
|---|---|---|---|---|---|---|---|---|---|---|---|---|---|---|---|---|
| Aberdeen | | 1–2 | 1–0 | 1–2 | 2–0 | 2–1 | 2–1 | 2–0 | 3–0 | 2–2 | 0–1 | 2–2 | 2–2 | 1–1 | 1–0 | 1–2 |
| Airdrieonians | 2–0 | | 2–5 | 1–2 | 4–1 | 1–1 | 2–0 | 1–1 | 4–2 | 2–1 | 3–2 | 0–1 | 4–1 | 5–1 | 0–0 | 0–0 |
| Celtic | 1–0 | 2–1 | | 3–1 | 7–0 | 1–0 | 1–0 | 2–0 | 4–0 | 3–1 | 4–1 | 0–1 | 5–1 | 1–0 | 2–1 | 0–1 |
| Dundee | 6–0 | 0–0 | 1–0 | | 3–0 | 1–1 | 1–1 | 2–1 | 3–1 | 2–0 | 1–1 | 1–1 | 1–0 | 1–1 | 1–2 | 2–0 |
| Falkirk | 1–1 | 0–0 | 0–5 | 2–0 | | 2–2 | 2–1 | 7–3 | 4–0 | 6–1 | 1–1 | 3–3 | 3–5 | 1–6 | 2–0 | 2–0 |
| Heart of Midlothian | 1–1 | 2–1 | 1–1 | 4–0 | 1–0 | | 1–0 | 3–0 | 2–0 | 4–0 | 2–0 | 4–0 | 4–1 | 2–2 | 1–0 | 3–2 |
| Hibernian | 1–0 | 0–4 | 0–1 | 2–1 | 4–1 | 0–3 | | 2–1 | 1–2 | 2–3 | 1–1 | 3–1 | 4–0 | 1–2 | 0–1 | 2–1 |
| Kilmarnock | 2–1 | 0–0 | 2–4 | 2–2 | 2–1 | 1–1 | 0–2 | | 3–1 | 1–0 | 1–2 | 3–2 | 7–0 | 1–3 | 5–3 | 2–0 |
| Morton | 2–2 | 0–2 | 0–4 | 0–0 | 4–2 | 2–1 | 0–1 | 3–0 | | 1–1 | 0–1 | 2–2 | 1–0 | 0–3 | 1–0 | 1–1 |
| Motherwell | 3–3 | 2–1 | 0–4 | 4–1 | 2–3 | 2–1 | 0–2 | 5–1 | 1–1 | | 2–3 | 2–0 | 4–2 | 3–3 | 1–1 | 2–1 |
| Partick Thistle | 1–2 | 1–0 | 0–3 | 1–0 | 2–0 | 4–1 | 1–0 | 2–1 | 2–1 | 2–2 | | 3–0 | 2–1 | 1–1 | 1–1 | 2–5 |
| Port Glasgow Athletic | 3–1 | 2–2 | 0–1 | 1–1 | 2–1 | 2–5 | 0–0 | 3–2 | 1–3 | 1–2 | 1–2 | | 3–2 | 1–4 | 1–2 | 2–5 |
| Queen's Park | 3–0 | 1–3 | 0–6 | 0–0 | 0–5 | 0–3 | 2–2 | 4–1 | 2–3 | 2–1 | 1–2 | 2–2 | | 1–2 | 3–1 | 0–5 |
| Rangers | 1–0 | 1–3 | 3–2 | 1–1 | 3–1 | 0–5 | 1–1 | 3–2 | 1–2 | 2–1 | 1–0 | 4–0 | 3–1 | | 1–0 | 2–4 |
| St Mirren | 4–2 | 0–1 | 1–3 | 1–1 | 2–1 | 0–1 | 2–0 | 2–1 | 3–1 | 1–1 | 2–1 | 3–0 | 3–1 | 3–2 | | 2–0 |
| Third Lanark | 1–0 | 1–2 | 0–1 | 1–2 | 2–0 | 1–3 | 3–1 | 5–0 | 0–1 | 6–1 | 2–1 | 3–0 | 6–3 | 3–0 | 1–0 | |

Legend: Blue = home team win; Yellow = draw; Red = away team win.
