= 1909–10 Scottish Division One =

17th season of top-tier football league in Scotland

Scottish Division One
- Season: 1909–10
- Champions: Celtic
- Relegated: Port Glasgow Athletic

The 1909–10 Scottish Division One season was won by Celtic by two points over nearest rival Falkirk.

== League table ==
Pos	Team	Pld	W	D	L	GF	GA	GD	Pts	Relegation
1	Celtic (C)	34	24	6	4	63	22	+41	54	Champions
2	Falkirk	34	22	8	4	71	28	+43	52	
3	Rangers	34	20	6	8	70	35	+35	46	
4	Aberdeen	34	16	8	10	44	29	+15	40	
5	Clyde	34	14	9	11	47	40	+7	37	
6	Dundee	34	14	8	12	52	44	+8	36	
7	Third Lanark	34	13	8	13	62	44	+18	34	
8	Hibernian	34	14	6	14	33	40	−7	34	
9	Airdrieonians	34	12	9	13	46	57	−11	33	
10	Motherwell	34	12	8	14	59	60	−1	32	
11	Kilmarnock	34	12	8	14	53	59	−6	32	
12	Heart of Midlothian	34	12	7	15	59	50	+9	31	
13	St Mirren	34	13	5	16	48	58	−10	31	
14	Queen's Park	34	12	6	16	54	74	−20	30	
15	Hamilton Academical	34	11	6	17	50	67	−17	28	
16	Partick Thistle	34	8	10	16	45	59	−14	26	
17	Morton	34	11	3	20	38	60	−22	25	
18	Port Glasgow Athletic (R)	34	3	5	26	25	93	−68	11	Relegated to the 1910–11 Scottish Division Two

(C) Champions; (R) Relegated

== Results ==
Home \ Away	ABE	AIR	CEL	CLY	DND	FAL	HAM	HOM	HIB	KIL	MOR	MOT	PAR	PGA	QPA	RAN	STM	THI
Aberdeen		1–0	0–1	1–1	3–1	0–1	1–0	3–0	1–0	0–1	1–0	2–2	1–1	3–0	3–1	1–1	2–0	2–1
Airdrieonians	1–3		0–2	2–0	3–0	2–1	2–1	3–1	0–2	2–2	3–2	2–2	1–3	1–1	3–4	2–1	0–0	1–1
Celtic	2–0	3–1		2–1	1–0	2–0	3–1	1–0	0–0	2–1	3–0	2–2	3–1	4–0	6–0	1–1	1–1	2–0
Clyde	2–1	1–1	0–1		2–0	0–0	1–0	2–2	2–1	0–0	1–0	3–1	5–0	0–1	0–1	1–0	2–1	2–1
Dundee	0–0	3–0	0–0	1–1		1–0	2–1	4–1	4–2	2–2	2–1	2–0	1–1	4–0	3–0	4–2	2–1	2–0
Falkirk	1–0	4–1	2–0	6–1	6–1		2–1	2–1	2–0	4–0	2–0	3–1	2–0	0–0	1–1	3–1	1–1	3–1
Hamilton Academical	1–0	1–1	1–5	2–1	3–3	1–3		2–1	1–1	1–7	2–2	3–1	1–0	3–1	4–2	2–3	3–1	4–2
Heart of Midlothian	0–0	0–1	1–2	2–0	1–0	4–2	1–2		1–0	3–0	5–1	5–1	2–2	6–0	3–2	1–3	0–1	2–2
Hibernian	1–2	3–0	1–0	0–1	0–0	1–1	1–0	1–4		2–1	2–1	1–0	3–1	2–1	1–0	1–0	0–0	0–0
Kilmarnock	0–2	3–3	0–1	6–3	2–1	0–2	1–0	1–1	4–0		2–0	2–1	2–1	4–0	6–1	0–2	2–1	0–0
Morton	0–1	0–1	2–1	2–1	1–0	0–1	2–0	3–3	2–0	4–0		0–1	2–1	2–0	0–2	1–4	1–0	0–2
Motherwell	2–1	0–1	1–3	0–0	1–1	2–2	2–2	1–0	3–1	3–1	5–0		2–2	6–3	3–0	2–3	5–2	1–3
Partick Thistle	1–1	1–1	1–3	1–1	1–0	2–2	2–3	1–3	3–1	3–0	0–1	2–1		3–1	0–2	0–0	3–2	0–0
Port Glasgow Athletic	0–3	1–2	2–3	0–5	0–3	0–1	2–1	0–2	0–2	1–1	1–1	0–1	2–4		3–0	1–1	0–2	2–4
Queen's Park	2–2	2–4	0–1	2–2	3–0	1–4	2–0	2–2	1–2	1–1	5–2	3–1	2–0	6–1		3–2	2–1	0–0
Rangers	2–1	3–0	0–0	1–0	2–1	0–1	5–1	1–0	1–0	3–0	2–1	4–1	2–1	4–0	7–1		1–1	1–0
St Mirren	1–2	2–1	2–1	0–2	3–2	1–5	2–0	1–0	3–0	2–1	0–2	1–2	3–2	4–1	2–0	1–6		3–1
Third Lanark	2–0	3–0	0–1	1–3	0–2	1–1	2–2	3–1	0–1	7–0	6–2	0–2	3–1	5–0	4–0	2–1	5–2	

Legend: Blue = home team win; Yellow = draw; Red = away team win.
