= 1906–07 Scottish Division One =

14th season of top-tier football league in Scotland

Scottish Division One
- Season: 1906–07
- Champions: Celtic; 7th title
- Matches: 306
- Goals: 909 (2.97 per match)
- Top goalscorer: Jimmy Quinn (29 goals)

The 1906–07 Scottish Division One season was won by Celtic by seven points over nearest rival Dundee.

Celtic also won the Scottish Cup, the first time a club claimed the national 'double'.

== League table ==
| Pos | Team | Pld | W | D | L | GF | GA | GD | Pts | Qualification or relegation |
|---|---|---|---|---|---|---|---|---|---|---|
| 1 | Celtic (C) | 34 | 23 | 9 | 2 | 80 | 30 | +50 | 55 | Champions |
| 2 | Dundee | 34 | 18 | 12 | 4 | 53 | 26 | +27 | 48 | |
| 3 | Rangers | 34 | 19 | 7 | 8 | 69 | 33 | +36 | 45 | |
| 4 | Airdrieonians | 34 | 18 | 6 | 10 | 59 | 44 | +15 | 42 | |
| 5 | Falkirk | 34 | 17 | 7 | 10 | 73 | 58 | +15 | 41 | |
| 6 | Third Lanark | 34 | 15 | 9 | 10 | 57 | 48 | +9 | 39 | |
| 7 | St Mirren | 34 | 12 | 13 | 9 | 50 | 44 | +6 | 37 | |
| 8 | Clyde | 34 | 15 | 6 | 13 | 47 | 52 | −5 | 36 | |
| 9 | Heart of Midlothian | 34 | 11 | 13 | 10 | 46 | 43 | +3 | 35 | |
| 10 | Motherwell | 34 | 12 | 9 | 13 | 45 | 48 | −3 | 33 | |
| 11 | Hibernian | 34 | 10 | 10 | 14 | 40 | 49 | −9 | 30 | |
| 12 | Aberdeen | 34 | 10 | 10 | 14 | 48 | 55 | −7 | 30 | |
| 13 | Morton | 34 | 11 | 6 | 17 | 41 | 50 | −9 | 28 | |
| 14 | Partick Thistle | 34 | 9 | 8 | 17 | 40 | 60 | −20 | 26 | |
| 15 | Queen's Park | 34 | 9 | 6 | 19 | 51 | 66 | −15 | 24 | |
| 16 | Port Glasgow Athletic | 34 | 7 | 7 | 20 | 30 | 67 | −37 | 21 | |
| 17 | Kilmarnock | 34 | 8 | 5 | 21 | 40 | 72 | −32 | 21 | |
| 18 | Hamilton Academical | 34 | 8 | 5 | 21 | 40 | 64 | −24 | 21 | |

(C) Champions

== Results ==
| Home \ Away | ABE | AIR | CEL | CLY | DND | FAL | HAM | HOM | HIB | KIL | MOR | MOT | PAR | PGA | QPA | RAN | STM | THI |
|---|---|---|---|---|---|---|---|---|---|---|---|---|---|---|---|---|---|---|
| Aberdeen | | 0–0 | 2–2 | 3–0 | 0–3 | 0–0 | 2–1 | 2–3 | 1–1 | 3–0 | 2–0 | 2–2 | 0–0 | 1–0 | 2–1 | 0–3 | 4–2 | 0–2 |
| Airdrieonians | 0–2 | | 0–2 | 4–0 | 1–2 | 4–2 | 1–0 | 3–2 | 3–2 | 1–0 | 3–2 | 0–0 | 1–0 | 5–0 | 3–2 | 2–3 | 1–0 | 4–1 |
| Celtic | 2–1 | 2–1 | | 3–3 | 0–0 | 3–2 | 2–0 | 3–0 | 2–1 | 5–0 | 2–1 | 1–1 | 4–1 | 4–0 | 2–1 | 2–1 | 1–1 | 2–0 |
| Clyde | 1–3 | 2–0 | 0–2 | | 1–1 | 1–0 | 2–0 | 1–3 | 3–1 | 2–0 | 0–0 | 1–0 | 3–1 | 3–1 | 2–2 | 1–5 | 3–1 | 1–2 |
| Dundee | 0–0 | 1–1 | 0–0 | 0–2 | | 3–2 | 1–0 | 2–0 | 0–0 | 4–2 | 1–0 | 1–0 | 5–0 | 0–1 | 0–0 | 2–0 | 2–1 | 2–1 |
| Falkirk | 3–2 | 3–0 | 2–3 | 3–0 | 4–2 | | 5–2 | 2–1 | 2–1 | 2–1 | 2–2 | 2–1 | 1–1 | 2–2 | 6–1 | 2–1 | 1–1 | 3–2 |
| Hamilton Academical | 4–2 | 1–2 | 2–5 | 1–1 | 1–3 | 3–1 | | 5–1 | 2–4 | 0–2 | 0–2 | 0–3 | 3–1 | 0–2 | 3–1 | 0–3 | 2–3 | 0–1 |
| Heart of Midlothian | 1–1 | 0–1 | 3–3 | 0–1 | 0–0 | 2–1 | 3–1 | | 4–1 | 1–0 | 1–0 | 1–1 | 5–1 | 2–0 | 2–2 | 0–1 | 1–1 | 1–1 |
| Hibernian | 2–1 | 4–0 | 0–1 | 2–0 | 0–4 | 1–2 | 0–1 | 0–0 | | 1–0 | 2–1 | 1–1 | 2–2 | 1–0 | 2–1 | 1–3 | 2–2 | 1–1 |
| Kilmarnock | 1–3 | 0–1 | 2–2 | 1–2 | 1–3 | 1–4 | 1–0 | 2–2 | 1–3 | | 3–0 | 3–2 | 3–1 | 2–1 | 3–1 | 1–5 | 1–0 | 3–3 |
| Morton | 2–1 | 1–1 | 0–2 | 1–0 | 1–2 | 3–1 | 3–0 | 0–0 | 2–1 | 2–2 | | 1–1 | 0–2 | 3–0 | 3–0 | 2–1 | 2–0 | 0–1 |
| Motherwell | 3–2 | 1–1 | 0–6 | 0–1 | 0–3 | 4–0 | 0–2 | 2–0 | 0–0 | 3–0 | 4–1 | | 2–2 | 1–0 | 0–5 | 1–0 | 1–2 | 3–2 |
| Partick Thistle | 2–0 | 0–4 | 0–2 | 0–2 | 0–0 | 0–3 | 1–1 | 1–0 | 3–0 | 3–0 | 5–0 | 3–2 | | 0–1 | 0–1 | 2–2 | 1–4 | 1–0 |
| Port Glasgow Athletic | 2–2 | 0–3 | 1–1 | 3–3 | 1–1 | 2–3 | 0–0 | 0–0 | 1–2 | 3–2 | 2–1 | 0–1 | 1–0 | | 3–1 | 0–2 | 0–2 | 1–3 |
| Queen's Park | 2–0 | 1–3 | 0–4 | 0–3 | 1–2 | 3–1 | 3–1 | 1–2 | 3–0 | 1–1 | 2–3 | 2–1 | 3–2 | 4–0 | | 1–2 | 0–3 | 0–1 |
| Rangers | 6–2 | 2–1 | 2–1 | 4–0 | 2–2 | 2–2 | 0–1 | 1–1 | 1–0 | 3–0 | 2–0 | 0–1 | 1–2 | 5–0 | 3–2 | | 1–1 | 0–0 |
| St Mirren | 2–2 | 4–2 | 0–3 | 1–0 | 1–1 | 1–1 | 1–1 | 0–2 | 1–1 | 3–0 | 2–1 | 1–0 | 1–1 | 4–1 | 1–1 | 0–0 | | 0–2 |
| Third Lanark | 2–0 | 2–2 | 2–1 | 4–2 | 2–0 | 2–3 | 2–2 | 2–2 | 0–0 | 2–1 | 2–1 | 2–3 | 3–1 | 3–1 | 2–2 | 0–2 | 2–3 | |

Legend: Blue = home team win; Yellow = draw; Red = away team win.
