= 1907–08 Scottish Division One =

15th season of top-tier football league in Scotland

Scottish Division One
- Season: 1907–08
- Champions: Celtic

The 1907–08 Scottish Division One season was won by Celtic by four points over nearest rival Falkirk.

== League table ==
| Pos | Team | Pld | W | D | L | GF | GA | GD | Pts |
|---|---|---|---|---|---|---|---|---|---|
| 1 | Celtic (C) | 34 | 24 | 7 | 3 | 86 | 27 | +59 | 55 |
| 2 | Falkirk | 34 | 22 | 7 | 5 | 103 | 42 | +61 | 51 |
| 3 | Rangers | 34 | 21 | 8 | 5 | 74 | 40 | +34 | 50 |
| 4 | Dundee | 34 | 20 | 8 | 6 | 71 | 28 | +43 | 48 |
| 5 | Hibernian | 34 | 17 | 8 | 9 | 55 | 42 | +13 | 42 |
| 6 | Airdrieonians | 34 | 18 | 5 | 11 | 58 | 41 | +17 | 41 |
| 7 | St Mirren | 34 | 13 | 10 | 11 | 50 | 59 | −9 | 36 |
| 8 | Aberdeen | 34 | 13 | 9 | 12 | 45 | 44 | +1 | 35 |
| 9 | Third Lanark | 34 | 13 | 7 | 14 | 45 | 50 | −5 | 33 |
| 10 | Motherwell | 34 | 12 | 7 | 15 | 61 | 53 | +8 | 31 |
| 11 | Heart of Midlothian | 34 | 11 | 6 | 17 | 50 | 62 | −12 | 28 |
| 12 | Hamilton Academical | 34 | 10 | 8 | 16 | 55 | 65 | −10 | 28 |
| 13 | Morton | 34 | 9 | 9 | 16 | 43 | 66 | −23 | 27 |
| 14 | Partick Thistle | 34 | 8 | 9 | 17 | 43 | 69 | −26 | 25 |
| 15 | Kilmarnock | 34 | 6 | 13 | 15 | 38 | 61 | −23 | 25 |
| 16 | Queen's Park | 34 | 7 | 8 | 19 | 54 | 84 | −30 | 22 |
| 17 | Clyde | 34 | 5 | 8 | 21 | 38 | 75 | −37 | 18 |
| 18 | Port Glasgow Athletic | 34 | 5 | 7 | 22 | 39 | 98 | −59 | 17 |

(C) Champions

== Results ==
| Home \ Away | ABE | AIR | CEL | CLY | DND | FAL | HAM | HOM | HIB | KIL | MOR | MOT | PAR | PGA | QPA | RAN | STM | THI |
|---|---|---|---|---|---|---|---|---|---|---|---|---|---|---|---|---|---|---|
| Aberdeen | | 0–1 | 2–1 | 3–1 | 1–1 | 1–1 | 3–0 | 1–0 | 1–1 | 1–0 | 1–2 | 2–1 | 1–0 | 3–1 | 3–0 | 0–0 | 1–3 | 1–1 |
| Airdrieonians | 0–1 | | 0–0 | 2–0 | 0–2 | 2–2 | 5–2 | 2–3 | 0–2 | 1–0 | 3–0 | 1–1 | 7–2 | 3–1 | 2–0 | 3–0 | 3–0 | 3–0 |
| Celtic | 3–0 | 1–1 | | 5–1 | 3–2 | 3–2 | 3–0 | 6–0 | 4–0 | 4–1 | 2–0 | 3–0 | 4–1 | 5–0 | 4–1 | 2–1 | 4–0 | 1–1 |
| Clyde | 2–2 | 0–3 | 0–2 | | 2–3 | 1–2 | 3–2 | 1–1 | 1–1 | 0–0 | 1–2 | 2–0 | 0–1 | 0–4 | 5–4 | 0–2 | 1–4 | 2–1 |
| Dundee | 1–0 | 3–1 | 2–0 | 6–1 | | 2–2 | 3–0 | 0–0 | 0–1 | 4–0 | 5–2 | 0–0 | 1–0 | 3–1 | 5–0 | 1–2 | 6–0 | 1–0 |
| Falkirk | 4–0 | 1–2 | 1–1 | 2–0 | 1–2 | | 5–1 | 3–0 | 3–1 | 5–0 | 4–1 | 2–1 | 3–1 | 9–0 | 5–1 | 4–4 | 5–2 | 1–0 |
| Hamilton Academical | 3–0 | 1–1 | 2–4 | 1–0 | 2–1 | 1–3 | | 2–1 | 1–1 | 3–3 | 1–0 | 2–3 | 4–1 | 4–1 | 2–2 | 2–2 | 1–1 | 0–1 |
| Heart of Midlothian | 3–1 | 2–0 | 1–0 | 1–0 | 1–0 | 2–3 | 4–3 | | 1–2 | 1–0 | 2–2 | 0–3 | 1–3 | 5–0 | 7–2 | 1–2 | 0–1 | 1–2 |
| Hibernian | 1–0 | 4–0 | 1–2 | 2–1 | 0–1 | 0–4 | 2–5 | 2–3 | | 3–1 | 3–0 | 1–1 | 6–0 | 2–1 | 4–1 | 0–3 | 2–1 | 2–0 |
| Kilmarnock | 1–0 | 0–1 | 0–0 | 2–2 | 1–1 | 1–6 | 2–0 | 2–0 | 3–0 | | 1–2 | 2–0 | 0–1 | 1–1 | 2–2 | 0–2 | 2–2 | 2–2 |
| Morton | 2–0 | 0–2 | 2–3 | 1–1 | 2–2 | 0–2 | 3–2 | 1–1 | 0–3 | 2–2 | | 1–1 | 2–0 | 2–0 | 3–2 | 2–3 | 1–1 | 0–2 |
| Motherwell | 2–3 | 2–0 | 2–2 | 3–0 | 0–1 | 1–5 | 2–1 | 3–0 | 0–0 | 1–2 | 4–0 | | 3–4 | 6–0 | 6–1 | 1–2 | 2–3 | 2–1 |
| Partick Thistle | 0–6 | 0–1 | 0–3 | 3–1 | 1–3 | 1–1 | 1–1 | 1–1 | 1–1 | 2–2 | 2–2 | 2–0 | | 1–1 | 0–3 | 1–2 | 1–2 | 2–0 |
| Port Glasgow Athletic | 1–1 | 1–3 | 0–3 | 2–3 | 0–5 | 1–3 | 1–0 | 1–1 | 1–3 | 4–1 | 2–4 | 2–2 | 0–5 | | 3–2 | 1–6 | 1–2 | 0–0 |
| Queen's Park | 2–2 | 3–2 | 0–2 | 4–1 | 1–3 | 2–4 | 0–3 | 6–3 | 1–2 | 1–1 | 1–1 | 1–2 | 0–0 | 1–1 | | 3–1 | 2–0 | 0–1 |
| Rangers | 4–0 | 1–2 | 0–1 | 1–1 | 2–0 | 2–2 | 1–0 | 2–1 | 1–1 | 1–0 | 3–0 | 4–2 | 3–2 | 5–1 | 1–1 | | 2–2 | 2–0 |
| St Mirren | 0–3 | 3–1 | 2–2 | 1–1 | 0–0 | 3–2 | 2–2 | 3–1 | 0–1 | 0–0 | 2–1 | 2–1 | 2–2 | 1–3 | 2–0 | 0–2 | | 1–2 |
| Third Lanark | 1–1 | 3–0 | 1–3 | 2–1 | 1–1 | 2–1 | 0–1 | 2–1 | 0–0 | 6–3 | 2–0 | 1–3 | 2–1 | 3–2 | 1–4 | 3–5 | 1–2 | |

Legend: Blue = home team win; Yellow = draw; Red = away team win.
