= 1912–13 Rangers F.C. season =

Rangers
1912–13 season
- Chairman: John Ure Primrose
- Manager: William Wilton
- Ground: Ibrox Park
- Scottish League Division One: 1st P34 W24 D5 L5 F76 A41 Pts53
- Scottish Cup: Third round
- Top goalscorer: League: Willie Reid (22); All: Willie Reid (29)

The 1912–13 season was the 39th season of competitive football by Rangers.

== Overview ==
Rangers played a total of 47 competitive matches during the 1912–13 season.

== Results ==
All results are written with Rangers' score first.

=== Scottish League Division One ===
Date	Opponent	Venue	Result	Attendance	Scorers
17 August 1912	Airdrieonians	H	4–2	25,000	
24 August 1912	Hamilton Academical	A	2–0	18,000	
31 August 1912	Dundee	H	3–3	40,000	
7 September 1912	St Mirren	A	3–0	20,000	
14 September 1912	Motherwell	A	2–1	20,000	
21 September 1912	Hearts	H	2–4	50,000	
30 September 1912	Kilmarnock	H	3–0	14,000	
5 October 1912	Aberdeen	A	3–1	20,000	
19 October 1912	Hibernian	A	1–0	16,000	
26 October 1912	Celtic	A	2–3	45,000	
2 November 1912	Greenock Morton	H	1–1	18,000	
9 November 1912	Queen's Park	A	3–2	12,000	
16 November 1912	Third Lanark	H	3–0	20,000	
23 November 1912	Clyde	H	3–1	18,000	
30 November 1912	Falkirk	A	0–2	15,000	
7 December 1912	Raith Rovers	A	2–2	12,000	
14 December 1912	St Mirren	H	2–1	12,000	
21 December 1912	Airdrieonians	A	0–3	7,000	
28 December 1912	Aberdeen	H	3–1	15,000	
1 January 1913	Celtic	H	0–1	67,000	
2 January 1913	Partick Thistle	A	3–2	22,000	
4 January 1913	Hibernian	H	5–3	20,000	
11 January 1913	Motherwell	H	3–1	8,000	
25 January 1913	Morton	A	3–0	12,000	
1 February 1913	Raith Rovers	H	4–0	8,000	
1 March 1913	Kilmarnock	A	3–2	6,000	
8 March 1913	Hamilton Academical	H	3–2	12,000	
15 March 1913	Hearts	A	1–1	18,000	
22 March 1913	Partick Thistle	H	2–0	12,000	
24 March 1913	Third Lanark	A	1–0	25,000	
5 April 1913	Queen's Park	H	4–0	10,000	
15 April 1913	Clyde	A	1–0	18,000	
19 April 1913	Dundee	A	0–0	12,000	
26 April 1913	Falkirk	H	2–1	16,000	

=== Inter City Midweek Football League ===
Date	Opponent	Venue	Result	Attendance	Scorers
15 October 1912	Aberdeen	H	5–2		
23 October 1912	Hearts	A	0–3		
29 October 1912	Hibernian	H	2–1	500	
5 November 1912	Celtic	H	4–0	5,000	

=== Scottish Cup ===
Date	Round	Opponent	Venue	Result	Attendance	Scorers
8 February 1913	R2	Hamilton Academical	A	1–1	16,000	
15 February 1913	R2 R	Hamilton Academical	H	2–0	37,000	
22 February 1913	R3	Falkirk	H	1–3	48,000	

== Appearances ==
Player	Position	Appearances	Goals
(Scotland) Alec Bennett	FW	28	6
(Scotland) A. Boden	MF	1	0
(Scotland) James Bowie	MF	28	6
(Scotland) Andrew Brown	FW	8	5
(Scotland) Robert Brown	DF	20	0
(Scotland) Robert Campbell	DF	28	1
(Scotland) Thomas Farrington	GK	9	0
(Scotland) James Ferguson	DF	1	0
(Scotland) Jimmy Galt	MF	34	0
(Scotland) John Goodwin	FW	25	9
(Scotland) Gordon	GK	4	0
(Scotland) Jimmy Gordon	DF	37	3
(Scotland) John Hempsey	GK	25	0
(Scotland) Joe Hendry	MF	16	0
(England) Billy Hogg	FW	23	9
(Scotland) Thomas Laurie	FW	1	0
(England) Herbert Lock	GK	8	0
(Scotland) James Logan	DF	33	1
(Scotland) Willie Montgomery	FW	11	2
(Scotland) Harry Muir	DF	3	0
(Scotland) George Ormond	DF	33	0
(Scotland) Bobby Parker	FW	14	15
(Scotland) Jimmy Paterson	MF	30	9
(Scotland) George Ramsay	FW	3	0
(Scotland) Willie Reid	FW	35	29
(Scotland) James Riddell	MF	4	0
(Scotland) John Robertson	MF	16	0
(Scotland) Alec Smith	FW	32	7
(Scotland) George Waddell	MF	7	0

== See also ==
- 1912–13 in Scottish football
