= 1911–12 Rangers F.C. season =

Rangers
1911–12 season
- Chairman: John Ure Primrose
- Manager: William Wilton
- Ground: Ibrox Park
- Scottish League Division One: 1st P34 W24 D3 L7 F86 A34 Pts51
- Scottish Cup: Third round
- Top goalscorer: League: Willie Reid (33); All: Willie Reid (39)

The 1911–12 season was the 38th season of competitive football by Rangers.

== Overview ==
Rangers played a total of 41 competitive matches during the 1911–12 season.

== Results ==
All results are written with Rangers' score first.

=== Scottish League Division One ===
Date	Opponent	Venue	Result	Attendance	Scorers
16 August 1911	Raith Rovers	H	5–0	11,000	
19 August 1911	Greenock Morton	H	6–1	25,000	
26 August 1911	Clyde	A	2–0	35,000	
2 September 1911	Dundee	H	2–1	30,000	
16 September 1911	Aberdeen	A	2–1	14,000	
25 September 1911	Hibernian	H	2–0	40,000	
30 September 1911	Third Lanark	H	4–0	22,000	
14 October 1911	Airdrieonians	A	2–2	18,000	
21 October 1911	Celtic	H	3–1	47,000	
28 October 1911	Partick Thistle	A	1–0	27,000	
4 November 1911	St Mirren	H	4–0	13,000	
11 November 1911	Motherwell	A	2–1	15,000	
18 November 1911	Queen's Park	H	1–0	20,000	
25 November 1911	Hamilton Academical	H	7–0	12,000	
2 December 1911	Greenock Morton	A	1–2	10,000	
9 December 1911	St Mirren	A	5–1	15,000	
16 December 1911	Hearts	H	2–1	22,000	
23 December 1911	Falkirk	A	2–0	10,000	
30 December 1911	Kilmarnock	H	6–1	10,000	
1 January 1912	Celtic	A	0–3	70,000	
2 January 1912	Partick Thistle	H	4–1	20,000	
6 January 1912	Hibernian	A	0–5	13,000	
13 January 1912	Clyde	H	1–2	30,000	
20 January 1912	Aberdeen	H	2–0	18,000	
3 February 1912	Hamilton Academical	A	1–1	8,000	
17 February 1912	Third Lanark	A	3–1	25,000	
24 February 1912	Airdrieonians	H	4–1	15,000	
2 March 1912	Queen's Park	A	0–0	25,000	
9 March 1912	Falkirk	H	4–0	8,000	
16 March 1912	Dundee	A	1–2	7,000	
23 March 1912	Raith Rovers	A	1–0	6,000	
30 March 1912	Kilmarnock	A	2–3	4,000	
15 April 1912	Hearts	A	1–2	9,000	
27 April 1912	Motherwell	H	3–1	6,000	

=== Inter City Midweek Football League ===
Date	Opponent	Venue	Result	Attendance	Scorers
15 October 1912	Aberdeen	H	5–2		
23 October 1912	Hearts	A	0–3		
29 October 1912	Hibernian	H	2–1	500	
5 November 1912	Celtic	H	4–0	5,000	

=== Scottish Cup ===
Date	Round	Opponent	Venue	Result	Attendance	Scorers
27 January 1912	R2	Stenhousemuir	H	3–1	7,500	
10 February 1912	R3	Clyde	A	1–3	52,000	

== Appearances ==
Player	Position	Appearances	Goals
(Scotland) Samuel Allan	DF	2	0
(Scotland) Alec Bennett	FW	31	13
(Scotland) James Bowie	MF	28	5
(Scotland) Robert Brown	DF	5	0
(Scotland) Andrew Brown	FW	8	1
(Scotland) William Brown	DF	1	0
(Scotland) Robert Campbell	DF	39	0
(Scotland) George Chapman	DF	2	1
(Scotland) Thomas Farrington	GK	3	0
(Scotland) Jimmy Galt	MF	31	2
(Scotland) Adam Gibson	FW	1	1
(Scotland) John Goodwin	FW	20	8
(Scotland) Jimmy Gordon	DF	36	2
(Scotland) Joe Hendry	MF	39	3
(England) Billy Hogg	FW	34	19
(Scotland) George Law	DF	11	0
(England) Herbert Lock	GK	38	0
(Scotland) George Ormond	DF	14	0
(Scotland) Bobby Parker	FW	3	2
(Scotland) Jimmy Paterson	MF	7	2
(Scotland) Willie Reid	FW	39	39
(Scotland) Andrew Richmond	DF	16	0
(Scotland) James Riddell	MF	2	0
(Scotland) John Robertson	MF	2	0
(Scotland) Alec Smith	FW	34	2
(Scotland) George Waddell	MF	5	0

== See also ==
- 1911–12 in Scottish football
