= 1910–11 Rangers F.C. season =

Rangers
1910–11 season
- Chairman: John Ure Primrose
- Manager: William Wilton
- Ground: Ibrox Park
- Scottish League Division One: 1st P34 W23 D6 L5 F90 A34 Pts52
- Scottish Cup: Third round
- Top goalscorer: League: Willie Reid (38); All: Willie Reid (48)

The 1910–11 season was the 37th season of competitive football by Rangers.

== Overview ==
Rangers played a total of 43 competitive matches during the 1910–11 season.

== Results ==
All results are written with Rangers' score first.

=== Scottish League Division One ===
Date	Opponent	Venue	Result	Attendance	Scorers
20 August 1910	St Mirren	H	5–0		
27 August 1910	Raith Rovers	A	2–0		
3 September 1910	Dundee	H	1–2		
10 September 1910	Hamilton Academical	A	4–2		
17 September 1910	Aberdeen	H	2–4		
19 September 1910	Heart of Midlothian	A	4–1		
26 September 1910	Hibernian	H	4–0	14,000	
1 October 1910	Motherwell	A	2–1		
15 October 1910	Third Lanark	A	1–1		
22 October 1910	Greenock Morton	H	1–5		
29 October 1910	Celtic	A	1–0		
5 November 1910	Airdrieonians	H	7–1	15,000	
12 November 1910	Kilmarnock	H	3–0		
19 November 1910	Queen's Park	A	4–0		
26 November 1910	Motherwell	H	7–1		
3 December 1910	Aberdeen	A	0–1		
10 December 1910	Falkirk	H	1–1		
17 December 1910	St Mirren	A	1–2		
24 December 1910	Heart of Midlothian	H	2–0		
31 December 1910	Kilmarnock	A	2–0		
2 January 1911	Celtic	H	1–1		
3 January 1911	Partick Thistle	A	2–2		
7 January 1911	Clyde	H	6–1		
14 January 1911	Hamilton Academical	H	4–0		
21 January 1911	Airdrieonians	A	4–1		
4 February 1911	Raith Rovers	A	4–1		
18 February 1911	Partick Thistle	H	2–0		
11 March 1911	Hibernian	A	3–1	12,000	
18 March 1911	Queen's Park	H	4–0		
25 March 1911	Greenock Morton	A	2–2		
8 April 1911	Dundee	A	2–0		
15 April 1911	Falkirk	A	2–2		
20 April 1911	Third Lanark	H	3–1		
22 April 1911	Clyde	A	1–0		

=== Scottish Cup ===
Date	Round	Opponent	Venue	Result	Attendance	Scorers
28 January 1911	R1	Kilmarnock	H	2–1	40,000	
11 February 1911	R2	Greenock Morton	A	3–0	38,000	
25 February 1911	R3	Dundee	A	1–2	30,000	

== Appearances ==
Player	Position	Appearances	Goals
(Scotland) Andrew Brown	FW	3	2
(Scotland) Robert Brown	DF	4	0
(Scotland) Alec Bennett	FW	31	10
(Scotland) James Bowie	MF	23	5
(Scotland) Robert Campbell	DF	28	1
(Scotland) George Chapman	DF	26	3
(Ireland) Alex Craig	DF	1	0
(Scotland) Jimmy Galt	MF	25	1
(Scotland) Adam Gibson	FW	6	5
(Scotland) John Goodwin	FW	11	4
(Scotland) Joe Hendry	MF	37	1
(Scotland) Jimmy Gordon	DF	37	6
(England) Billy Hogg	FW	39	16
(Scotland) George Law	DF	30	0
(England) Herbert Lock	GK	43	0
(Scotland) James McCaulay	FW	1	0
(Scotland) Bobby Parker	FW	2	1
(Scotland) Jimmy Paterson	MF	2	0
(Scotland) Willie Reid	FW	42	48
(Scotland) Andrew Richmond	DF	27	0
(Scotland) Alec Smith	FW	38	5
(Scotland) David Taylor	DF	1	0
(Scotland) William Yuille	FW	6	1

== See also ==
- 1910–11 in Scottish football
