= 1913–14 Rangers F.C. season =

Rangers
1913–14 season
- Chairman: John Ure Primrose
- Manager: William Wilton
- Ground: Ibrox Park
- Scottish League Division One: 2nd P38 W27 D5 L6 F79 A31 Pts59
- Scottish Cup: Third round
- Top goalscorer: League: Willie Reid (24); All: Willie Reid (29)

The 1913–14 season was the 40th season of competitive football by Rangers.

== Overview ==
Rangers played a total of 44 competitive matches during the 1913–14 season. They finished runners-up in the Scottish League Division One after winning 27 of the 38 league matches.

== Results ==
All results are written with Rangers' score first.

=== Scottish League Division One ===
| Date | Opponent | Venue | Result | Attendance | Scorers |
|---|---|---|---|---|---|
| 16 August 1913 | Kilmarnock | A | 6–1 | 9,000 | |
| 23 August 1913 | St Mirren | H | 2–1 | 35,000 | |
| 30 August 1913 | Hamilton Academical | A | 1–0 | 20,000 | |
| 6 September 1913 | Aberdeen | H | 5–1 | 20,000 | |
| 13 September 1913 | Heart of Midlothian | A | 1–2 | 15,500 | |
| 15 September 1913 | Hibernian | A | 3–0 | 12,000 | |
| 20 September 1913 | Dundee | H | 0–1 | 45,000 | |
| 22 September 1913 | Aberdeen | A | 0–0 | 18,000 | |
| 29 September 1913 | Queen's Park | H | 3–0 | 25,000 | |
| 4 October 1913 | Morton | A | 1–0 | 18,000 | |
| 18 October 1913 | Third Lanark | A | 4–2 | 30,000 | |
| 25 October 1913 | Celtic | H | 0–2 | 63,500 | |
| 1 November 1913 | Raith Rovers | A | 3–0 | 14,000 | |
| 8 November 1913 | Dumbarton | H | 3–2 | 12,000 | |
| 15 November 1913 | Airdrieonians | H | 2–0 | 15,000 | |
| 22 November 1913 | Motherwell | A | 0–1 | 16,000 | |
| 29 November 1913 | Clyde | A | 1–0 | 26,000 | |
| 6 December 1913 | Greenock Morton | H | 1–0 | 25,000 | |
| 13 December 1913 | Falkirk | H | 3–2 | 24,000 | |
| 20 December 1913 | Dundee | A | 2–0 | 18,000 | |
| 27 December 1913 | Hamilton Academical | H | 3–0 | 6,000 | |
| 1 January 1914 | Celtic | A | 0–4 | 83,000 | |
| 3 January 1914 | St Mirren | A | 1–0 | 16,000 | |
| 5 January 1914 | Partick Thistle | H | 0–0 | 10,000 | |
| 10 January 1914 | Ayr United | A | 2–1 | 9,000 | |
| 17 January 1914 | Motherwell | H | 0–0 | 25,000 | |
| 31 January 1914 | Raith Rovers | H | 4–0 | 10,000 | |
| 14 February 1914 | Airdireonians | A | 3–0 | 15,000 | |
| 28 February 1914 | Queen's Park | A | 6–0 | 35,000 | |
| 7 March 1914 | Clyde | H | 2–1 | 35,000 | |
| 14 March 1914 | Dumbarton | A | 3–0 | 8,000 | |
| 21 March 1914 | Kilmarnock | H | 1–0 | 18,000 | |
| 25 March 1914 | Ayr United | H | 5–2 | 10,000 | |
| 1 April 1914 | Falkirk | A | 1–4 | 5,000 | |
| 7 April 1914 | Hibernian | H | 1–1 | 4,000 | |
| 13 April 1914 | Partick Thistle | A | 1–1 | 12,000 | |
| 18 April 1914 | Third Lanark | H | 2–0 | 12,000 | |
| 25 April 1914 | Heart of Midlothian | H | 3–2 | 12,000 | |

=== Scottish Cup ===
| Date | Round | Opponent | Venue | Result | Attendance | Scorers |
|---|---|---|---|---|---|---|
| 7 February 1914 | R2 | Alloa Athletic | H | 5–0 | 7,000 | |
| 21 February 1914 | R3 | Hibernian | A | 1–2 | 28,000 | |

== Appearances ==
| Player | Position | Appearances | Goals |
|---|---|---|---|
| (Scotland) Alec Bennett | FW | 31 | 8 |
| (Scotland) James Bowie | MF | 33 | 8 |
| (Scotland) Andrew Brown | DF | 12 | 1 |
| (Scotland) Robert Brown | DF | 12 | 0 |
| (Scotland) Tommy Cairns | FW | 9 | 2 |
| (Scotland) Robert Campbell | DF | 20 | 0 |
| (Ireland) Alex Craig | DF | 1 | 0 |
| (Scotland) Scott Duncan | MF | 25 | 5 |
| (Scotland) James Ferguson | DF | 1 | 0 |
| (Scotland) John Fulton | DF | 16 | 1 |
| (Scotland) Jimmy Galt | MF | 21 | 0 |
| (Scotland) John Glenn | GK | 4 | 0 |
| (Scotland) John Goodwin | FW | 1 | 0 |
| (Scotland) Jimmy Gordon | DF | 36 | 4 |
| (Scotland) John Hempsey | GK | 24 | 0 |
| (Scotland) Joe Hendry | MF | 32 | 2 |
| (England) Herbert Lock | GK | 16 | 0 |
| (Scotland) James Logan | DF | 36 | 5 |
| (Scotland) Harry Muir | DF | 21 | 0 |
| (Scotland) George Ormond | DF | 18 | 0 |
| (Scotland) Bobby Parker | FW | 3 | 2 |
| (Scotland) Jimmy Paterson | MF | 36 | 6 |
| (Scotland) Willie Reid | FW | 39 | 29 |
| (Scotland) Charles Scott | DF | 3 | 0 |
| (Scotland) Alec Smith | FW | 13 | 5 |
| (Scotland) James Stewart | FW | 21 | 13 |

== See also ==
- 1913–14 in Scottish football
