= 1914–15 Rangers F.C. season =

Rangers
1914–15 season
- Chairman: John Ure Primrose
- Manager: William Wilton
- Ground: Ibrox Park
- Scottish League Division One: 3rd P38 W23 D4 L11 F74 A47 Pts50
- Top goalscorer: League: Willie Reid (28); All: Willie Reid (29)

The 1914–15 season was the 41st season of competitive football by Rangers.

== Overview ==
Rangers played a total of 44 competitive matches during the 1914–15 season. They finished third in the Scottish League Division One after winning 23 of the 38 league matches and collecting a total of 50 points (15 behind league winners Celtic).

The Scottish Cup was not competed for this season as the Scottish Football Association had withdrawn the tournament due to the outbreak of the First World War.

== Results ==
All results are written with Rangers' score first.

=== Scottish League Division One ===
Date	Opponent	Venue	Result	Attendance	Scorers
15 August 1914	Hamilton Academical	H	1–0	20,000	Reid
22 August 1914	Aberdeen	A	2–0	15,000	Reid, Paterson
29 August 1914	Kilmarnock	H	2–1	15,000	Reid, Bennett
5 September 1914	Falkirk	A	3–1	10,000	Reid, Cairns, Bennett
12 September 1914	Dundee	A	1–1	15,000	Reid
19 September 1914	Heart of Midlothian	H	1–2	41,000	Bowie
28 September 1914	Hibernian	H	4–2	14,000	Bowie, Reid, Carins, Paterson
3 October 1914	Greenock Morton	H	0–2	16,000	
10 October 1914	Raith Rovers	A	2–1	7,000	Gordon, Bennett
17 October 1914	Ayr United	A	0–2	13,000	
24 October 1914	Raith Rovers	H	1–2	14,000	Cairns
31 October 1914	Celtic	A	1–2	35,000	Reid
7 November 1914	Queen's Park	H	4–1	20,000	Reid (2), Gordon (2)
14 November 1914	Dumbarton	A	1–1	10,000	Reid
21 November 1914	Airdrieonians	A	2–1	8,000	Duncan, Reid
28 November 1914	Third Lanark	H	3–0	6,000	Reid (2), Gordon
5 December 1914	St Mirren	H	5–0	8,000	Logan, Cairns, Reid, Bowie, Paterson
12 December 1914	Kilmarnock	A	1–0	5,000	Cairns
19 December 1914	Motherwell	H	5–0	6,000	Gordon (2), Bowie, Reid, Paterson
26 December 1914	Third Lanark	A	1–1	6,000	Reid
1 January 1915	Celtic	H	2–1	50,000	Bowie, Reid
2 January 1915	Partick Thistle	A	1–3	18,000	Duncan
4 January 1915	Airdrieonians	H	0–5	12,000	
9 January 1915	Clyde	H	1–2	8,000	Cairns
16 January 1915	Greenock Morton	A	1–0	10,000	Reid
23 January 1915	Dumbarton	H	1–0	8,000	Cairns
30 January 1915	Hibernian	A	2–1	8,000	Anderson, Gordon (pen.)
6 February 1915	Falkirk	H	3–0	8,000	Cairns (2), Reid
13 February 1915	Ayr United	H	1–3	10,000	Reid
20 February 1915	Heart of Midlothian	A	4–3	23,500	Reid (3), Cairns
27 February 1915	Motherwell	A	4–2	8,000	Reid (2), Cairns (2)
6 March 1915	Dundee	H	2–1	12,000	Cairns, Paterson
13 March 1915	Clyde	A	2–1	12,000	Cairns, Paterson
27 March 1915	Aberdeen	H	1–1	10,000	Hendry
3 April 1915	Hamilton Academical	A	3–4	6,000	Bowie, Cairns, Paterson
5 April 1915	Partick Thistle	H	0–1	12,000	
10 April 1915	St Mirren	A	2–0	12,000	Reid (2)
24 April 1915	Queen's Park	A	4–0	10,000	Cunningham (2), Reid, Gordon

== Appearances ==
Player	Position	Appearances (Note: Statistics for three War Fund Shield matches still to be added.)	Goals
(Scotland) Willie Reid	FW	40	29
(Ireland) Alex Craig	DF	40	0
(Scotland) Tommy Cairns	FW	38	18
(Scotland) James Bowie	MF	37	6
(Scotland) Peter Pursell	DF	33	0
(Scotland) Jimmy Gordon	DF	33	8
(Scotland) Jimmy Paterson	MF	33	7
(England) Herbert Lock	GK	27	0
(Scotland) Thomas Kelso	DF	23	0
(Scotland) James Logan	DF	21	1
(Scotland) Scott Duncan	MF	21	2
(Scotland) Alec Bennett	FW	18	3
(Scotland) Joe Hendry	MF	20	1
(Scotland) Harry Muir	DF	17	0
(Scotland) Robert Brown	DF	15	0
(Scotland) John Hempsey	GK	14	0
(Scotland) Alec Smith	FW	8	0
(Scotland) Andy Cunningham	FW	5	3
(Scotland) John Anderson	MF	3	1
(Scotland) Jim Thomson	FW	3	0
(Scotland) George Baird	MF	1	0
(Ireland) Bert Manderson	DF	1	0

== See also ==
- 1914–15 in Scottish football
- Navy and Army War Fund Shield
