= 1913–14 Dundee F.C. season =

Dundee
1913–14 season
- Manager: William Wallace
- Stadium: Dens Park
- Division One: 7th
- Scottish Cup: Second round
- Top goalscorer: League: Billy Hogg (17); All: Billy Hogg (17)
Home colours

The 1913–14 season was the twenty-first season in which Dundee competed at a Scottish national level, playing in Division One, where they would finish in 7th place. Dundee would also compete in the Scottish Cup, where they were knocked out in the 2nd round by St Mirren.

== Scottish Division One ==
Statistics provided by Dee Archive.

Match day	Date	Opponent	H/A	Score	Dundee scorer(s)	Attendance
1	16 August	St Mirren	H	1–0	Montgomery	16,000
2	23 August	Clyde	A	1–2	Hogg	
3	30 August	Ayr United	H	2–0	Hogg, Skene	6,000
4	6 September	Motherwell	A	1–0	Skene	10,000
5	13 September	Airdrieonians	H	2–0	Steven, Montgomery	4,000
6	20 September	Rangers	A	1–0	Kelso	15,000
7	27 September	Queen's Park	H	5–2	Skene (2), Kelso, Hogg (2)	12,000
8	4 October	Hibernian	A	1–4	Hogg	9,000
9	6 October	Falkirk	H	4–1	Read, Kelso, Hogg, Barbour	7,000
10	11 October	Hamilton Academical	H	1–0	Hogg	12,000
11	18 October	Celtic	A	0–1		25,000
12	25 October	Raith Rovers	H	2–1	Kelso, Hogg	12,000
13	1 November	Partick Thistle	A	1–2	Barbour	16,000
14	8 November	Falkirk	A	0–4		4,000
15	15 November	Greenock Morton	H	1–2	Hamilton	10,000
16	22 November	Heart of Midlothian	H	2–2	Hogg, Hamilton	16,000
17	29 November	Kilmarnock	A	0–0		5,000
18	6 December	Dumbarton	H	5–1	Skene (2), Montgomery, Steven, Wall	8,000
19	13 December	Airdrieonians	A	0–3		5,000
20	20 December	Rangers	H	0–2		18,000
21	25 December	Third Lanark	A	1–2	Adams	10,000
22	27 December	Raith Rovers	A	1–4	Skene	2,000
23	1 January	Aberdeen	H	0–1		10,000
24	3 January	Hibernian	H	2–2	Steven, Kelso	12,000
25	10 January	Greenock Morton	A	0–3		6,000
26	17 January	Celtic	H	0–1		20,000
27	24 January	Heart of Midlothian	A	0–3		12,000
28	31 January	Partick Thistle	H	4–1	Philip (3), McCulloch	8,000
29	14 February	Ayr United	A	3–1	Philip (2), Wylie	6,000
30	21 February	Hamilton Academical	A	1–1	Neish	5,000
31	28 February	St Mirren	A	3–0	Philip (3)	7,000
32	4 March	Clyde	H	2–0	Philip, Hogg	10,000
33	7 March	Dumbarton	A	3–2	Steven, Montgomery, Philip	4,000
34	28 March	Aberdeen	A	2–2	Philip, Hogg	10,000
35	4 April	Motherwell	H	2–1	Hogg, McCulloch	7,000
36	11 April	Kilmarnock	H	3–1	Hogg, Philip (2)	8,000
37	18 April	Queen's Park	A	4–0	Philip, Hogg (3)	7,000
38	29 April	Third Lanark	H	3–1	Hogg, Brown	5,000

=== League table ===
Pos	Team	Pld	W	D	L	GF	GA	GD	Pts
5	Falkirk	38	20	9	9	69	51	+18	49
6	Airdrieonians	38	18	12	8	72	43	+29	48
7	Dundee	38	19	5	14	64	53	+11	43
8	Third Lanark	38	13	10	15	42	51	−9	36
9	Clyde	38	11	11	16	44	44	0	33

Source: "1913-1914 Division 1 - SPFL Archive". SPFL.

== Scottish Cup ==
Statistics provided by Dee Archive.

Match day	Date	Opponent	H/A	Score	Dundee scorer(s)	Attendance
2nd round	7 February	St Mirren	A	1–2	Philip	16,000

== Player statistics ==
Statistics provided by Dee Archive

No.	Pos	Nat	Player	Total		First Division		Scottish Cup	
No.	Pos	Nat	Player	Apps	Goals	Apps	Goals	Apps	Goals
	FW	(Scotland) SCO	Harry Adams	8	1	8	1	0	0
	DF	(Scotland) SCO	Alec Aitken	29	0	28	0	1	0
	GK	(Scotland) SCO	Dave Balfour	17	0	16	0	1	0
	FW	(Scotland) SCO	John Barbour	17	2	16	2	1	0
	FW	(Scotland) SCO	Davie Brown	1	2	1	2	0	0
	FW	(Scotland) SCO	Robert Hamilton	4	2	4	2	0	0
	FW	(England) ENG	Billy Hogg	35	17	34	17	1	0
	DF	(Scotland) SCO	Bob Husson	1	0	1	0	0	0
	MF	(Scotland) SCO	Joe Johnstone	3	0	3	0	0	0
	DF	(Scotland) SCO	Tommy Kelso	34	5	33	5	1	0
	DF	(Scotland) SCO	Jimmy Lawson	3	0	3	0	0	0
	GK	(Scotland) SCO	Jack Lyall	22	0	22	0	0	0
	FW	(Scotland) SCO	Tom McCulloch	12	2	11	2	1	0
	MF	(Scotland) SCO	Roy McDonald	24	0	23	0	1	0
	MF	(Scotland) SCO	Bert McIntosh	38	0	37	0	1	0
	FW	(Scotland) SCO	Jim Meville	1	0	1	0	0	0
	FW	(Scotland) SCO	Bill Montgomery	29	4	28	4	1	0
	FW	(Scotland) SCO	Tommy Neish	2	1	2	1	0	0
	FW	(Scotland) SCO	George G. Philip	38	15	37	14	1	1
	MF	(England) ENG	Bill Read	7	1	7	1	0	0
	FW	(Scotland) SCO	Clyde Skene	12	7	12	7	0	0
	FW	(Scotland) SCO	George Smith	7	0	7	0	0	0
	FW	(Scotland) SCO	George Steven	28	4	28	4	0	0
	DF	(Scotland) SCO	David Thomson	20	0	19	0	1	0
	MF	(Scotland) SCO	Len Wall	17	1	17	1	0	0
	FW	(Scotland) SCO	Bill Wylie	37	6	32	4	5	2

== See also ==
- List of Dundee F.C. seasons
