= 1912–13 Dundee F.C. season =

Dundee
1912–13 season
- Manager: William Wallace
- Stadium: Dens Park
- Division One: 13th
- Scottish Cup: Quarter-finals
- Top goalscorer: League: Andy Walker (7); All: Robert Hamilton (8)
Home colours

The 1912–13 season was the twentieth season in which Dundee competed at a Scottish national level, playing in Division One, where they would finish in 13th place. Dundee would also compete in the Scottish Cup, where they would make it to the Quarter-finals before losing in a 2nd replay to Clyde.

== Scottish Division One ==
Statistics provided by Dee Archive.

Match day	Date	Opponent	H/A	Score	Dundee scorer(s)	Attendance
1	17 August	Motherwell	A	0–0		8,000
2	24 August	Aberdeen	H	1–3	Neal	16,000
3	31 August	Rangers	A	3–3	R. Hamilton, Neal, Steven	35,000
4	7 September	Clyde	H	1–3	Wylie	12,000
5	21 September	Celtic	H	3–1	D. Hamilton, Steven (2)	20,000
6	28 September	Queen's Park	H	1–0	R. Hamilton	7,000
7	5 October	Kilmarnock	A	0–2		4,000
8	12 October	Raith Rovers	A	2–2	Johnstone, Steven	6,000
9	19 October	Partick Thistle	A	0–2		10,000
10	26 October	Third Lanark	H	1–0	Walker	6,000
11	2 November	Airdrieonians	A	1–1	Walker	5,000
12	9 November	Raith Rovers	H	1–0	Walker	
13	16 November	Greenock Morton	H	0–1		6,000
14	23 November	Hamilton Academical	A	0–1		4,000
15	30 November	Hibernian	H	2–2	Philip, Walker	6,000
16	7 December	St Mirren	A	0–2		5,000
17	14 December	Heart of Midlothian	H	3–0	Taylor (o.g.), Walker, Wylie	6,000
18	21 December	Celtic	A	0–2		8,000
19	25 December	Third Lanark	A	1–4	MacFarlane	8,000
20	28 December	Partick Thistle	H	1–0	MacFarlane	4,000
21	1 January	Aberdeen	A	0–1		10,000
22	4 January	Falkirk	A	0–2		6,000
23	11 January	Airdrieonians	H	1–1	MacFarlane	2,500
24	18 January	Queen's Park	A	3–1	Philip, Walker, Steven	6,000
25	25 January	Hibernian	A	0–4		9,000
26	1 February	Kilmarnock	H	0–0		6,000
27	15 February	Raith Rovers	A	0–0		6,000
28	1 March	Motherwell	H	0–0		5,000
29	22 March	Heart of Midlothian	A	3–4	Ross, R. Hamilton (2)	12,000
30	29 March	Greenock Morton	A	1–1	Steven	5,000
31	5 April	Hamilton Academical	H	2–1	MacFarlane, Wylie	4,000
32	7 April	St Mirren	H	0–0		2,500
33	12 April	Clyde	A	2–2	Walker, Wylie	2,000
34	19 April	Rangers	H	0–0		12,000

=== League table ===
Pos	Team	Pld	W	D	L	GF	GA	GD	Pts
11	Kilmarnock	34	10	11	13	37	54	−17	31
12	St Mirren	34	10	10	14	50	60	−10	30
=13	Dundee	34	8	13	13	33	46	−13	29
=13	Morton	34	11	7	16	50	59	−9	29
15	Third Lanark	34	8	12	14	31	41	−10	28

Source: "1912-1913 Division 1 - SPFL Archive". SPFL.

== Scottish Cup ==
Statistics provided by Dee Archive.

Match day	Date	Opponent	H/A	Score	Dundee scorer(s)	Attendance
2nd round	8 February	Thornhill	H	5–0	R. Hamilton (2), Wylie, Langlands, Montgomery	10,000
3rd round	22 February	Partick Thistle	A	1–0	R. Hamilton	18,000
Quarter-finals	8 March	Clyde	H	1–1	Wylie	25,000
QF replay	29 January	Clyde	A	0–0		27,000
QF 2nd replay	19 March	Clyde	N	1–2	R. Hamilton	16,000

== Player statistics ==
Statistics provided by Dee Archive

No.	Pos	Nat	Player	Total		First Division		Scottish Cup	
No.	Pos	Nat	Player	Apps	Goals	Apps	Goals	Apps	Goals
	DF	(Scotland) SCO	Alec Aitken	30	0	25	0	5	0
	GK	(Scotland) SCO	Dave Balfour	8	0	8	0	0	0
	FW	(Scotland) SCO	Andy Fraser	1	0	1	0	0	0
	FW	(Scotland) SCO	Davie Hamilton	14	1	14	1	0	0
	FW	(Scotland) SCO	Robert Hamilton	33	8	28	4	5	4
	MF	(Scotland) SCO	Joe Johnstone	27	1	23	1	4	0
	DF	(Scotland) SCO	Tommy Kelso	4	0	4	0	0	0
	FW	(Scotland) SCO	George Langlands	13	1	8	0	5	1
	DF	(Scotland) SCO	Jimmy Lawson	30	0	29	0	1	0
	GK	(Scotland) SCO	Jack Lyall	31	0	26	0	5	0
	FW	(Scotland) SCO	Sandy MacFarlane	24	4	20	4	4	0
	MF	(Scotland) SCO	Pat McBride	1	0	1	0	0	0
	MF	(Scotland) SCO	Bert McIntosh	10	0	10	0	0	0
	FW	(Scotland) SCO	Bob McKnight	3	0	3	0	0	0
	FW	(Scotland) SCO	Jim Meville	1	0	1	0	0	0
	FW	(Scotland) SCO	Bill Montgomery	7	1	4	0	3	1
	MF	(Scotland) SCO	Bert Neal	18	2	18	2	0	0
	FW	(Scotland) SCO	George G. Philip	32	2	27	2	5	0
	MF	(England) ENG	Bill Read	8	0	5	0	3	0
	FW	(Scotland) SCO	David Ross	17	1	17	1	0	0
	FW	(Scotland) SCO	Jim Sotherwaite	3	0	3	0	0	0
	FW	(Scotland) SCO	George Steven	17	6	17	6	0	0
	MF	(Scotland) SCO	Jim Strachan	1	0	1	0	0	0
	DF	(Scotland) SCO	Tommy Tait	27	0	22	0	5	0
	MF	(Scotland) SCO	Andy Walker	20	7	19	7	1	0
	FW	(Scotland) SCO	Bill Wylie	37	6	32	4	5	2
	FW	(Scotland) SCO	Frank Young	8	0	8	0	0	0

== See also ==
- List of Dundee F.C. seasons
