= 1915–16 Rangers F.C. season =

Rangers
1915-16 season
- Chairman: John Ure Primrose
- Manager: William Wilton
- Ground: Ibrox Park
- Scottish League: 2nd P38 W25 D6 L7 F87 A39 Pts56
- Top goalscorer: League: Willie Reid (21); All: Willie Reid (26)

The 1915–16 season was the 42nd season of competitive football by Rangers.

== Overview ==
Rangers played a total of 42 competitive matches during the 1915–16 season. They finished second in the Scottish League after winning 25 of the 38 league matches and collecting a total of 56 points (11 behind league winners Celtic).

The Scottish Cup was not competed for this season as the Scottish Football Association had withdrawn the tournament due to the outbreak of the First World War.

== Results ==
All results are written with Rangers' score first.

=== Scottish League Division One ===
| Date | Opponent | Venue | Result | Attendance | Scorers |
|---|---|---|---|---|---|
| 21 August 1915 | Dumbarton | A | 3–1 | 6,000 | Reid (2), Cunningham |
| 28 August 1915 | Third Lanark | H | 4–0 | 16,000 | Cunningham (2), Reid (2) |
| 4 September 1915 | Kilmarnock | A | 3–0 | 8,000 | Reid, Cunningham, Cairns |
| 18 September 1915 | Ayr United | H | 5–2 | 16,000 | Reid (2), Duncan, Cairns, Cunningham |
| 2 October 1915 | Airdrieonians | A | 1–0 | 7,000 | Cunningham |
| 16 October 1915 | Hearts | H | 0–4 | 15,000 | |
| 23 October 1915 | Raith Rovers | A | 3–1 | 3,000 | Reid (2), Hendry |
| 30 October 1915 | Celtic | H | 3–0 | 45,000 | Duncan, Reid, Paterson |
| 6 November 1915 | Queen's Park | A | 6–0 | 14,000 | Cairns (2), Cunningham (2, 1 pen.), Fleming, Duncan |
| 13 November 1915 | Hamilton | H | 3–0 | 15,000 | Cunningham (2, 1 pen.), Duncan |
| 20 November 1915 | Falkirk | A | 1–2 | 3,000 | Cairns |
| 27 November 1915 | Hibernian | H | 4–2 | 7,000 | Cunningham (3), Paterson |
| 4 December 1915 | Morton | A | 0–2 | 10,000 | |
| 11 December 1915 | St Mirren | H | 4–0 | 6,000 | Gordon (2), Cunningham (2) |
| 18 December 1915 | Clyde | A | 2–0 | 12,000 | Reid, Cairns |
| 25 December 1915 | Falkirk | H | 1–0 | 10,000 | Paterson |
| 1 January 1916 | Celtic | A | 2–2 | 8,000 | Cunningham, Duncan |
| 3 January 1916 | Partick Thistle | H | 0–1 | 5,000 | |
| 8 January 1916 | Motherwell | H | 4–1 | 6,000 | Reid (3), Cairns |
| 15 January 1916 | Dundee | A | 0–2 | 6,000 | |
| 22 January 1916 | Kilmarnock | H | 3–1 | 50,000 | Bennett (2), Gordon |
| 29 January 1916 | Motherwell | A | 2–2 | 18,000 | Cairns, Reid |
| 5 February 1916 | Morton | H | 1–0 | 25,000 | Cairns |
| 12 February 1916 | Hearts | A | 2–1 | 17,500 | Gordon (2, 1 pen.) |
| 19 February 1916 | Aberdeen | H | 4–0 | 15,000 | Cunningham (2, 1 pen.), Reid, Cairns |
| 26 February 1916 | Ayr United | A | 0–1 | 7,000 | |
| 4 March 1916 | Airdrieonians | H | 3–0 | 12,000 | Gordon, Duncan, Reid |
| 11 March 1916 | Hibernian | A | 3–2 | 5,000 | Paterson (2), Reid |
| 18 March 1916 | Third Lanark | A | 1–0 | 22,000 | Branscombe |
| 1 April 1916 | Hamilton | A | 1–0 | 10,000 | Sneddon |
| 8 April 1916 | Raith Rovers | H | 3–0 | 10,000 | Gordon (2), Paterson |
| 10 April 1916 | Dundee | H | 3–2 | 5,000 | Lister, Cairns, Branscombe |
| 15 April 1916 | Partick Thistle | A | 2–5 | 30,000 | Cairns (2) |
| 17 April 1916 | St Mirren | A | 1–1 | 4,000 | Paterson |
| 20 April 1916 | Dumbarton | H | 2–2 | 3,000 | Duncan, Branscombe |
| 22 April 1916 | Clyde | H | 2–2 | 5,000 | Duncan, Branscombe |
| 24 April 1916 | Queen's Park | H | 6–0 | 6,000 | Reid (3), Duncan (2), Branscombe |
| 29 April 1916 | Aberdeen | A | 0–0 | 6,000 | |

== Appearances ==
| Player | Position | Appearances | Goals |
|---|---|---|---|
| (England) Herbert Lock | GK | 19 | 0 |
| (Scotland) Tommy Cairns | FW | 38 | 15 |
| (Ireland) Bert Manderson | DF | 35 | 0 |
| (Scotland) Harry Muir | DF | 33 | 0 |
| (Scotland) Jimmy Gordon | DF | 35 | 8 |
| (Scotland) Peter Pursell | DF | 23 | 0 |
| (Scotland) James Bowie | MF | 28 | 0 |
| (Scotland) Scott Duncan | MF | 36 | 10 |
| (Scotland) Andy Cunningham | FW | 23 | 19 |
| (Scotland) Willie Reid | FW | 28 | 26 |
| (Scotland) Tommy Cairns | FW | 34 | 12 |
| (Scotland) Jimmy Paterson | MF | 34 | 10 |
| (Scotland) John Hempsey | GK | 22 | 0 |
| (Ireland) Alex Craig | DF | 6 | 0 |
| (Scotland) James Logan | DF | 27 | 0 |
| (Scotland) Joe Hendry | MF | 20 | 1 |
| (Scotland) John Fleming | MF | 4 | 1 |
| (Scotland) Alec Bennett | FW | 18 | 2 |
| (Scotland) Robert Parker | FW | 1 | 0 |
| (Scotland) Frank Branscombe | MF | 7 | 5 |
| (Scotland) John Sneddon | MF | 5 | 1 |
| (Scotland) Jimmy Lister | FW | 5 | 1 |
| (Scotland) James McCrae | MF | 3 | 0 |
| (Scotland) John Fleming | MF | 4 | 1 |
| (Scotland) Jimmy Gourlay (Note: Appearance in the Glasgow Merchants Charity Cup; one-match loan from Morton.) | FW | 1 | 0 |
| (Scotland) William Bone | DF | 2 | 0 |
| (Scotland) John Ballantyne | MF | 1 | 0 |
| (Scotland) John Brander | MF | 3 | 0 |
| (Scotland) David Taylor | DF | 1 | 0 |
| (Scotland) Jackie Wright | DF | 1 | 0 |
| (England) Stan Seymour | FW | 1 | 0 |

== See also ==
- 1915–16 in Scottish football
