= 1907–08 Rangers F.C. season =

Rangers
1907–08 season
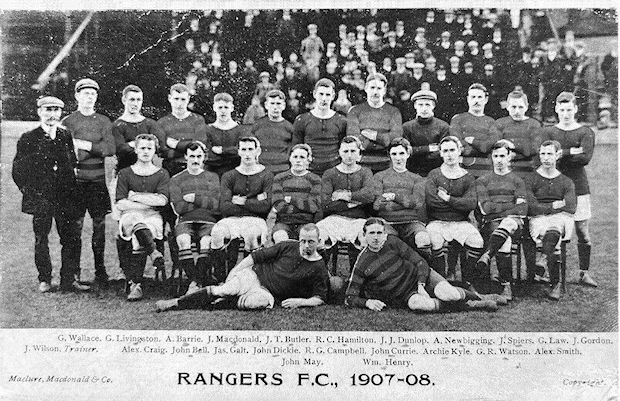
- Rangers F.C., 1907-08
- Chairman: James Henderson
- Manager: William Wilton
- Ground: Ibrox Park
- Scottish League Division One: 3rd P34 W21 D8 L5 F74 A40 Pts50
- Scottish Cup: Second round
- Top goalscorer: League: Robert Campbell (25); All: Robert Campbell (25)

The 1907–08 season was the 34th season of competitive football by Rangers.

== Overview ==
Rangers played a total of 37 competitive matches during the 1907–08 season. The side finished third in the league, five points behind champions Celtic, after winning 21 of the 34 matches.

The Scottish Cup campaign was ended at the hands of the league champions after a 2–1 home defeat. Rangers had drawn with Falkirk away and won the replay en route to the second round.

== Results ==
All results are written with Rangers' score first.

=== Scottish League Division One ===
Date	Opponent	Venue	Result	Attendance	Scorers
15 August 1907	Greenock Morton	H	3–0	7,000	Smith (2), Campbell
17 August 1907	Port Glasgow	A	6–1	6,000	Campbell (2), Livingstone (2), Macdonald, Thomson (og)
24 August 1907	Aberdeen	H	4–0	20,000	Campbell (3), Livingstone
31 August 1907	Falkirk	A	4–4	14,000	Campbell, Galt, May, Livingstone
7 September 1907	Kilmarnock	H	1–0	14,000	Campbell
21 September 1907	Greenock Morton	A	3–2	10,000	Galt, Campbell, Kyle
30 September 1907	Queen's Park	H	1–1	17,000	Livingstone
5 October 1907	Airdrieonians	H	1–2	22,000	Macdonald
2 November 1907	Queen's Park	A	1–3	20,000	Livingstone
9 November 1907	St Mirren	H	2–2	15,000	Kyle, Hamilton
16 November 1907	Partick Thistle	A	2–1	8,000	Steven, Campbell
23 November 1907	Hibernian	H	1–1	11,000	Campbell
30 November 1907	Third Lanark	A	5–3	9,000	Kyle (3), Spiers, Hamilton
7 December 1907	Heart of Midlothian	A	2–1	12,000	Kyle, Hamilton
14 December 1907	Motherwell	H	4–2	10,000	Spiers (2), May, Kyle
21 December 1907	Dundee	A	2–1	15,000	Campbell, May
28 December 1907	Falkirk	H	2–2	25,000	Spiers, Campbell
1 January 1908	Celtic	A	1–2	60,000	Kyle
2 January 1908	Partick Thistle	H	3–2	5,000	Livingstone (2), Kyle
4 January 1908	Airdrieonians	A	0–3	7,000	
11 January 1908	Third Lanark	H	2–0	8,000	Spiers, Kyle
18 January 1908	Aberdeen	A	0–0	10,000	
15 February 1908	Hamilton Academical	A	2–2	6,000	Livingstone, Macdonald
29 February 1908	Heart of Midlothian	H	2–1	6,000	Campbell, Barrie
7 March 1908	Kilmarnock	A	2–0	8,000	Livingstone, Smith
14 March 1908	Clyde	A	2–0	9,000	Kyle, Gordon
21 March 1908	Hamilton Academical	H	1–0	6,000	Campbell
28 March 1908	Hibernian	A	3–0	9,000	Campbell (3)
4 April 1908	Motherwell	A	2–1	3,000	Campbell (2)
11 April 1908	Clyde	H	1–1	6,000	Campbell
13 April 1908	St Mirren	A	2–0	4,000	Campbell, Kyle
18 April 1908	Port Glasgow	A	5–1	2,500	Campbell (3), Macdonald, Kyle
20 April 1908	Dundee	H	2–0	12,000	Noble, May (pen)
25 April 1908	Celtic	H	0–1	40,000	

=== Scottish Cup ===
Date	Round	Opponent	Venue	Result	Attendance	Scorers
25 January 1908	R1	Falkirk	A	2–2	20,000	Livingstone, May
1 February 1908	R1 R	Falkirk	H	4–1	52,000,	Smith (2), Kyle, Spiers
8 February 1908	R2	Celtic	H	1–2	23,000	Kyle

== Appearances ==
Player	Position	Appearances	Goals
(Scotland) Alex Newbigging	GK	29	0
(Scotland) Robert Campbell	DF	32	25
(Scotland) Jimmy Jackson	DF	14	0
(Scotland) Jimmy Sharp	DF	1	0
(Scotland) Joseph Hadden	GK	23	0
(Scotland) John May	DF	29	6
(Scotland) Robert Noble	MF	8	1
(Scotland) Alex Barrie	DF	14	1
(Scotland) Jimmy Speirs	FW	16	6
(Scotland) Archie Kyle	FW	30	14
(Scotland) Alex Smith	FW	25	5
(Scotland) James Galt	MF	30	2
(Scotland) John Bovill	MF	2	0
(Scotland) John McArthur	GK	6	0
(Scotland) Robert Steven	MF	9	1
(Scotland) David Taylor	DF	12	0
(Scotland) Billy Henry	DF	15	0
(Scotland) James R. Hamilton	FW	11	3
(Ireland) Alex Craig	DF	26	0
(Scotland) Albert Cunningham	MF	3	0
(Scotland) John Dickie	MF	12	0
(Scotland) George Law	DF	13	0
(Scotland) John Macdonald	MF	19	4
(Scotland) George Livingstone	MF	27	11
(Scotland) Jimmy Gordon	DF	22	1

== See also ==
- 1907–08 in Scottish football
- 1907–08 Scottish Cup
