= 1915–16 in Scottish football =

Football in Scotland
- Season: 1915–16

1915–16 in Scottish football

Division One champions
- Celtic

Junior Cup winners
- Petershill

The 1915–16 season was the 43rd season of competitive football in Scotland and the 26th season of the Scottish Football League. For this season, Division Two was abandoned due to World War I.

== League competitions ==
=== Scottish Football League ===
Pos	Team	Pld	W	D	L	GF	GA	GD	Pts
1	Celtic (C)	38	32	3	3	116	23	+93	67
2	Rangers	38	25	6	7	87	39	+48	56
3	Morton	37	22	7	8	86	35	+51	51
4	Ayr United	38	20	8	10	72	45	+27	48
5	Heart of Midlothian	37	20	6	11	66	45	+21	46
6	Partick Thistle	38	19	8	11	65	41	+24	46
7	Hamilton Academical	38	19	3	16	68	76	−8	41
8	Dundee	38	18	4	16	56	49	+7	40
9	Dumbarton	38	13	11	14	54	64	−10	37
10	Kilmarnock	38	12	11	15	46	49	−3	35
11	Aberdeen	38	11	12	15	51	64	−13	34
12	Falkirk	38	12	9	17	45	61	−16	33
13	St Mirren	38	13	4	21	50	67	−17	30
14	Motherwell	38	11	8	19	55	82	−27	30
15	Airdrieonians	38	11	8	19	44	74	−30	30
16	Third Lanark	38	9	11	18	40	56	−16	29
17	Clyde	38	11	7	20	49	71	−22	29
18	Queen's Park	38	11	6	21	53	100	−47	28
19	Hibernian	38	9	7	22	44	71	−27	25
20	Raith Rovers	38	9	5	24	30	65	−35	23

Source: "1915-1916 SFL - SPFL Archive". SPFL.
(C) Champions

== Other honours ==
=== Cup honours ===
==== National ====
Competition (Note: The Scottish Cup, Scottish Qualifying Cup (except 1914–15 and 1918–19), and Scottish Amateur Cup were not held during WWI years.)	Winner	Score	Runner-up
Scottish Junior Cup	Petershill	2 – 0	Parkhead

==== County ====
Competition (Note: The Border Cup, North of Scotland Cup, and Perthshire Cup were not held during WWI years. The Aberdeenshire Cup, Ayrshire Cup, Forfarshire Cup, Stirlingshire Cup, and Southern Counties Cup were not held either after 1914–15.) (Note: The East of Scotland Shield and Renfrewshire Cup were not held this season.)	Winner	Score	Runner-up
Dumbartonshire Cup	Clydebank	2 – 0	Vale of Leven
Fife Cup	Cowdenbeath	2 – 0	Raith Rovers
Forfarshire Cup	Montrose	2 – 0	Dundee Hibs
Glasgow Cup	Celtic	2 – 1	Rangers
Lanarkshire Cup	Wishaw Thistle	2 – 0	Dykehead
Linlithgowshire Cup	Armadale	1 – 0	Bathgate

=== Non-league honours ===
Senior Leagues

Division	Winner
Eastern League	Armadale
Western League	Vale of Leven

== Scotland national team ==
There were no official Scotland matches played, with the British Home Championship suspended due to World War I. Scotland did play an unofficial wartime international against England on 13 May 1916. England won 4–3 at Goodison Park, with Scotland represented by Ken Campbell, Billy Henry, Jimmy Frew, James Logan, James Galt, James Scott, James Reid, Percy Dawson, Willie Reid, Patrick Allan and Willie Wilson.

== See also ==
- 1915–16 Aberdeen F.C. season
- 1915–16 Rangers F.C. season
- Association football during World War I
