= Albert Bennett =

Albert Bennett may refer to:

- Albert Arnold Bennett (1849–1909), American Baptist missionary and hymn composer
- Sir Albert Bennett, 1st Baronet (1872–1945), British politician
- Albert Arnold Bennett Jr. (1888–1971), American mathematician, son of the missionary
- Albert Bennett (cricketer) (1910–1985), English cricketer
- Albert E. Bennett (1914–1971), American lawyer and politician
- Albert Bennett (footballer) (1944–2016), English footballer
- Albert F. Bennett, American zoologist, physiologist, evolutionary biologist, author, and academic

== See also ==
- Bennett (disambiguation)
- Bert Bennett (Hubert Henry Bennett, 1889/90–1968), English footballer
