= Adam Fleming =

Adam Fleming may refer to:

- Adam Fleming (businessman) (born 1948), British asset manager
- Adam Fleming (footballer), Scottish left-back active 1918–1922
- Adam Fleming (journalist) (born 1980), Scottish presenter
