= Jack Hogg =

English footballer

Personal information
- Full name: John Hogg
- Date of birth: 27 May 1881
- Place of birth: Sunderland, England
- Date of death: 2 August 1944 (aged 63)
- Place of death: Newcastle upon Tyne, England
- Height: 5 ft 8 in (1.73 m)
- Position: Half-back

Senior career*
| Years | Team | Apps | (Gls) |
| 1900–1901 | Sunderland | 0 | (0) |
| 1901–1903 | Morpeth Harriers | | |
| 1903–1905 | Sheffield United | 3 | (0) |
| 1905–1907 | Southampton | 43 | (1) |
| 1907–1909 | West Stanley | | |
| 1909–???? | Hartlepools United | | |
- * Club domestic league appearances and goals

John Hogg (27 May 1881 – 2 August 1944) was an English footballer who played as a half-back for various clubs in the 1900s.

== Football career ==
Hogg was born in Sunderland and joined his elder brother Billy as a trainee at Sunderland in 1900. Hogg failed to make the grade at Roker Park and moved to Morpeth Harriers of the Northern Alliance for two seasons.

In May 1903, Hogg joined Sheffield United in the Football League First Division, where he made three appearances at right-half in the 1903–04 season. He then moved to the south coast to join Southern League Southampton in the summer of 1905.

He made his debut for the "Saints" on 7 October 1905, in a 2–1 victory at home to Watford. Although he was often played at centre-half, he was more at home at right-half; he was primarily a "destructive" rather than "constructive" player who "appeared to be rather slow (although) he had an easy stride" and was "reliable and a great trier" but "tended to be over-awed in important matches". For the 1905–06 season, he became a regular in defence alongside England internationals Bert Lee and Kelly Houlker. In his first season at The Dell, Hogg made 24 league and 5 FA Cup appearances, scoring once, as Southampton finished as runners-up in the League.

Hogg was the regular right-half for the start of the 1906–07 season before he had a bad game in an FA Cup Second round replay at The Wednesday on 7 February 1907. In this match, Hogg was played out of position at right-back but repeatedly fluffed his clearances; his performance caused confusion in his own defence, allowing The Wednesday to win 3–1 and go on to claim the cup in the Final the following April. Hogg never appeared again in a Saints shirt, with John Robertson taking over from him.

At the end of the season, Hogg was released and returned to his native north east where he joined West Stanley, playing in the North Eastern League.

== Family ==
His brother, Billy, played at outside right, winning the Football League championship with Sunderland in 1901–02, before moving to Scotland where he won the Scottish League title three times with Rangers. He also made three appearances for England in 1902.
