= 1914–15 in Scottish football =

Football in Scotland
- Season: 1914–15

1914–15 in Scottish football

Division One champions
- Celtic

Division Two champions
- Leith Athletic

Junior Cup winners
- Parkhead

The 1914–15 season was the 42nd season of competitive football in Scotland and the 25th season of the Scottish Football League. The addition of Lochgelly United and Clydebank meant that there were fourteen teams in Division Two.

== League competitions ==
=== Scottish League Division One ===
Pos	Team	Pld	W	D	L	GF	GA	GD	Pts
1	Celtic (C)	38	30	5	3	91	25	+66	65
2	Heart of Midlothian	38	27	7	4	83	32	+51	61
3	Rangers	38	23	4	11	74	47	+27	50
4	Morton	38	18	12	8	74	48	+26	48
5	Ayr United	38	20	8	10	55	40	+15	48
6	Falkirk	38	16	7	15	48	48	0	39
7	Partick Thistle	38	15	8	15	56	58	−2	38
8	Hamilton Academical	38	16	6	16	60	55	+5	38
9	St Mirren	38	14	8	16	56	65	−9	36
10	Hibernian	38	12	11	15	59	66	−7	35
11	Airdrieonians	38	14	7	17	54	60	−6	35
12	Dumbarton	38	13	8	17	51	66	−15	34
13	Kilmarnock	38	15	4	19	55	59	−4	34
14	Dundee	38	12	9	17	43	61	−18	33
15	Aberdeen	38	11	11	16	39	52	−13	33
16	Third Lanark	38	10	12	16	51	57	−6	32
17	Clyde	38	12	6	20	44	59	−15	30
18	Motherwell	38	10	10	18	49	66	−17	30
19	Raith Rovers	38	9	10	19	53	68	−15	28
20	Queen's Park	38	4	5	29	27	90	−63	13

(C) Champions

Champions: Celtic

=== Scottish League Division Two ===
Pos	Team	Pld	W	D	L	GF	GA	GD	Pts	Qualification
1	Cowdenbeath (C)	26	16	5	5	49	17	+32	37 (Note: Cowdenbeath, Leith Athletic and St Bernard's finished level on points. A round-robin tournament to determine the champion was won by Cowdenbeath.)	
2	Leith Athletic	26	15	7	4	54	31	+23	37	Left the League
3	St Bernard's	26	18	1	7	66	34	+32	37	
4	East Stirlingshire	26	13	5	8	53	44	+9	31	
5	Clydebank	26	13	4	9	67	37	+30	30	Joined the 1917–18 Scottish Football League
6	Dunfermline Athletic	26	13	2	11	49	39	+10	28	
7	Johnstone	26	11	5	10	41	52	−11	27	
8	St Johnstone	26	10	6	10	56	53	+3	26	
9	Albion Rovers	26	9	7	10	37	42	−5	25	Joined the 1919–20 Scottish Football League
10	Lochgelly United	26	9	3	14	43	60	−17	21	
11	Dundee Hibernian	26	8	3	15	48	61	−13	19	
12	Abercorn	26	5	7	14	35	65	−30	17	Left the League
13	Arthurlie	26	6	4	16	36	66	−30	16	Left the League
14	Vale of Leven	26	4	5	17	33	66	−33	13	

Source: statto.com
Rules for classification: Teams finish equal if level on points. Points system: 2 points for a win, 1 point for a draw, 0 points for a loss
(C) Champions

== Other honours ==
=== Cup honours ===
==== National ====
Competition (Note: The Scottish Cup and Scottish Amateur Cup were not held during WWI years.)	Winner	Score	Runner-up
Navy and Army War Fund Shield	Morton	2 – 1	Rangers
Scottish Qualifying Cup	St Bernard's	3 – 0 (Note: Second replay needed.)	Dykehead
Scottish Junior Cup	Parkhead	2 – 0	Port Glasgow Athletic Juniors

==== County ====
Competition (Note: The Border Cup, North of Scotland Cup, and Perthshire Cup were not held during WWI years.)	Winner	Score	Runner-up
Aberdeenshire Cup	Aberdeen	7 – 2	Peterhead
Ayrshire Cup	Stevenston United	2 – 1 (Note: Replay needed.)	Kilmarnock
Dumbartonshire Cup	Dumbarton	4 – 3	Vale of Leven
East of Scotland Shield	Hearts	1 – 0	Hibernian
Fife Cup	Raith Rovers	4 – 0	East Fife
Forfarshire Cup	Dundee Hibs	2 – 0	Arbroath
Glasgow Cup	Clyde	1 – 0	Partick Thistle
Lanarkshire Cup	Airdrie	3 – 0	Hamilton
Linlithgowshire Cup	Broxburn	2 – 1	Bo'ness
Renfrewshire Cup	Morton	4 – 3 (Note: Aggregate over two legs.)	Johnstone
Southern Counties Cup	5th KOSB	2 – 1	St Cuthbert Wanderers
Stirlingshire Cup	King's Park	1 – 0	Falkirk

=== Non-league honours ===
Senior Leagues

Division	Winner
Central League	Armadale
Highland League	unfinished
Northern League	Forfar Athletic
Scottish Union	unfinished

== Scotland national team ==
There were no Scotland matches played with the British Home Championship suspended due to World War I.

== Other national teams ==
=== Scottish League XI ===
Date	Venue	Opponents	Score (Note: Scottish League XI's score is shown first.)	Scotland scorer(s)	Notes
12 October 1914	London (A)	(England) Southern League XI	1–1		
18 November 1914	Belfast (A)	(Northern Ireland) Irish League XI	2–1		
20 March 1915	Celtic Park, Glasgow (H)	(England) Football League XI	1–4		

== See also ==
- 1914–15 Aberdeen F.C. season
- 1914–15 Rangers F.C. season
- Association football during World War I
