= Alex Barrie =

Scottish footballer (1878–1918)

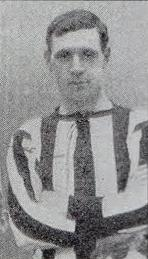

Personal information
- Full name: Alexander W. Barrie
- Date of birth: 18 August 1878
- Place of birth: Camlachie, Scotland
- Date of death: 1 October 1918 (aged 40)
- Place of death: Canal du Nord, France
- Position: Centre half

Senior career*
Years	Team	Apps	(Gls)
1898–1901	Parkhead		
1901–1902	St Bernard's	12	(1)
1902–1907	Sunderland	66	(3)
1907–1908	Rangers	11	(1)
1908–1912	Kilmarnock	121	(6)
- Abercorn

International career
1901	Scotland Juniors	3	(0)
- * Club domestic league appearances and goals

Alexander W. Barrie (18 August 1878 – 1 October 1918) was a Scottish professional footballer who played in the Scottish League for Kilmarnock, Rangers and St Bernard's as a centre half. He also played in the Football League for Sunderland and was capped by Scotland at junior level.

== Personal life ==
Barrie served as a corporal in the Highland Light Infantry during the First World War and was killed during the Battle of the Canal du Nord on 1 October 1918, just over five weeks before the armistice. He was buried in Flesquières Hill British Cemetery.

== Career statistics ==
Appearances and goals by club, season and competition
Club	Season	League			National Cup		Total	
Club	Season	Division	Apps	Goals	Apps	Goals	Apps	Goals
St Bernard's	1901–02	Scottish Second Division	12	1	0	0	12	1
Sunderland	1902–03	First Division	3	1	0	0	3	1
Sunderland	1903–04	First Division	17	1	1	0	18	1
Sunderland	1904–05	First Division	13	1	0	0	13	1
Sunderland	1905–06	First Division	23	0	4	1	27	1
Sunderland	1906–07	First Division	10	0	0	0	10	0
Sunderland	Total		66	3	5	1	71	4
Rangers	1907–08	Scottish First Division	11	1	3	0	14	1
Kilmarnock	1908–09	Scottish First Division	31	1	1	0	32	1
Kilmarnock	1909–10	Scottish First Division	31	2	2	0	33	2
Kilmarnock	1910–11	Scottish First Division	32	3	1	0	33	3
Kilmarnock	1911–12	Scottish First Division	27	0	1	0	28	0
Kilmarnock	Total		121	6	5	0	126	6
Career total			210	11	13	1	223	12

== Honours ==
Parkhead

- Scottish Junior Cup: 1898–99

Abercorn

- Scottish Qualifying Cup: 1912–13
