= Leslie Skene =

Scottish footballer (1882–1959)

Personal information
- Full name: Alexander Leslie Henderson Skene
- Date of birth: 22 August 1882
- Place of birth: Larbert, Scotland
- Date of death: 29 October 1959 (aged 77)
- Place of death: Douglas, Isle of Man
- Position: Goalkeeper

Youth career
- 1898–1900: George Watson's College
- 1900–1901: Edinburgh University

Senior career*
Years	Team	Apps	(Gls)
1901–1906	Queen's Park	52	(0)
1902	→ Hibernian (loan)	1	(0)
1903	→ Stenhousemuir (loan)		
1907–1910	Fulham	88	(0)
1910–1911	Glentoran		

International career
1904	Scotland	1	(0)
1904	Scottish League XI	1	(0)
1911	Irish League XI	1	(0)
- * Club domestic league appearances and goals

Alexander Leslie Henderson Skene MC (22 August 1882 – 29 October 1959) was a Scottish amateur footballer who played in the Football League for Fulham as a goalkeeper. He also played in the Scottish League for Queen's Park and Hibernian and in the Irish League for Glentoran. He won one cap for Scotland at international level.

== Personal life ==
Skene was the older brother of fellow footballer Clyde Skene. He was educated at George Watson's College, Edinburgh University, Queen's University and qualified as a psychiatrist. He went on to work at Lanark District Asylum. Skene served in the Royal Army Medical Corps during the First World War and rose to the rank of acting major. He was twice wounded at Gallipoli in 1915 and was awarded the Military Cross in 1918 for gallantry and distinguished service in the field. After the war, Skene held the positions of medical superintendent at Perth Criminal Mental Hospital and of senior assistant physician at Tooting Bec Hospital. He moved to the Isle of Man in 1922 and became medical superintendent of the Isle of Man Mental Hospital. Skene was a member of the British Medical Association for over 40 years and was president of the Isle of Man branch of the organisation in 1935 and 1936.

== Career statistics ==
Appearances and goals by club, season and competition
Club	Season	League			National Cup		Other		Total	
Club	Season	Division	Apps	Goals	Apps	Goals	Apps	Goals	Apps	Goals
Queen's Park	1900–01	Scottish First Division	1	0	0	0	0	0	1	0
Queen's Park	1901–02	Scottish First Division	1	0	0	0	0	0	1	0
Queen's Park	1902–03	Scottish First Division	1	0	0	0	1 (Note: Appearance in Glasgow Merchants Charity Cup)	0	2	0
Queen's Park	1903–04	Scottish First Division	23	0	1	0	2 (Note: Appearances in Glasgow Cup)	0	26	0
Queen's Park	1904–05	Scottish First Division	16	0	0	0	2 (Note: 1 appearance in Glasgow Merchants Charity Cup, 1 appearance in Glasgow Cup)	0	18	0
Queen's Park	1905–06	Scottish First Division	11	0	0	0	1	0	12	0
Queen's Park	Total		53	0	1	0	6	0	60	0
Hibernian (loan)	1901–02	Scottish First Division	1	0	—		—		1	0
Career total			54	0	1	0	6	0	61	0
