= 1907–08 Heart of Midlothian F.C. season =

Heart of Midlothian
1907–08 season
- Manager: William Waugh (to April); James McGhee (from April)
- Stadium: Tynecastle Park
- Scottish First Division: 11th
- Scottish Cup: 3rd Round

During the 1907–08 season Hearts competed in the Scottish First Division, the Scottish Cup and the East of Scotland Shield.

== Fixtures ==
=== East of Scotland Shield ===
12 October 1907 East of Scotland Shield SF	Hearts	0–1	Hibernian	Tynecastle Park

=== Rosebery Charity Cup ===
9 May 1908 Rosebery Charity Cup SF	Leith Athletic	0–2	Hearts	Easter Road

16 May 1908 Rosebery Charity Cup Final	St Bernard's	3–2	Hearts	Royal Gymnasium Ground

=== Scottish Cup ===
25 January 1908 Scottish Cup R1	Hearts	4–1	St Johnstone	Tynecastle Park
				Attendance: 3,000

8 February 1908 Scottish Cup R2	Hearts	4–0	Port Glasgow Athletic	Tynecastle Park
				Attendance: 9,000

21 March 1908 Scottish Cup R3	St Mirren	3–1	Hearts	St Mirren Park, Love Street
				Attendance: 16,000

=== East of Scotland League ===
19 August 1907 East of Scotland League	Leith Athletic	0–1	Hearts	Old Logie Green

21 August 1907 East of Scotland League	Hearts	4–0	Falkirk	Tynecastle Park

1 January 1908 East of Scotland League	Hearts	0–4	Hibernian	Tynecastle Park
				Attendance: 8,000

27 April 1908 East of Scotland League	Hearts	2–1	Aberdeen	Tynecastle Park
				Attendance: 5,000

=== Scottish First Division ===
17 August 1907 Scottish First Division	Hearts	1–0	Kilmarnock	Tynecastle Park
				Attendance: 10,000

24 August 1907 Scottish First Division	Clyde	1–1	Hearts	Shawfield Stadium
				Attendance: 5,000

31 August 1907 Scottish First Division	Hearts	7–2	Queen's Park	Tynecastle Park
				Attendance: 10,500

7 September 1907 Scottish First Division	Morton	1–1	Hearts	Cappielow Park
				Attendance: 5,000

14 September 1907 Scottish First Division	Hearts	1–0	Dundee	Tynecastle Park
				Attendance: 17,500

21 September 1907 Scottish First Division	St Mirren	3–1	Hearts	St Mirren Park, Love Street
				Attendance: 5,000

28 September 1907 Scottish First Division	Hearts	4–3	Hamilton Academical	Tynecastle Park
				Attendance: 7,500

5 October 1907 Scottish First Division	Third Lanark	2–1	Hearts	Cathkin Park
				Attendance: 5,000

19 October 1907 Scottish First Division	Falkirk	3–0	Hearts	Brockville Park
				Attendance: 8,000

24 October 1907 Scottish First Division	Hearts	3–1	Aberdeen	Tynecastle Park
				Attendance: 8,500

2 November 1907 Scottish First Division	Partick Thistle	1–1	Hearts	Meadowside
				Attendance: 3,000

9 November 1907 Scottish First Division	Airdrieonians	2–3	Hearts	Broomfield Park
				Attendance: 2,000

16 November 1907 Scottish First Division	Hibernian	2–3	Hearts	Easter Road
				Attendance: 12,000

23 November 1907 Scottish First Division	Hearts	1–0	Celtic	Tynecastle Park
				Attendance: 22,500

30 November 1907 Scottish First Division	Motherwell	3–0	Hearts	Fir Park
				Attendance: 5,000

7 December 1907 Scottish First Division	Hearts	1–2	Rangers	Tynecastle Park
				Attendance: 12,000

14 December 1907 Scottish First Division	Hearts	2–3	Falkirk	Tynecastle Park
				Attendance: 11,500

21 December 1907 Scottish First Division	Aberdeen	1–0	Hearts	Pittodrie Park
				Attendance: 5,500

28 December 1907 Scottish First Division	Hearts	1–3	Partick Thistle	Tynecastle Park
				Attendance: 3,500

2 January 1908 Scottish First Division	Hearts	5–0	Port Glasgow Athletic	Tynecastle Park
				Attendance: 3,000

4 January 1908 Scottish First Division	Dundee	0–0	Hearts	Dens Park
				Attendance: 9,000

11 January 1908 Scottish First Division	Hearts	0–1	St Mirren	Tynecastle Park
				Attendance: 5,500

18 January 1908 Scottish First Division	Port Glasgow Athletic	1–1	Hearts	Clune Park
				Attendance: 3,000

1 February 1908 Scottish First Division	Kilmarnock	2–0	Hearts	Rugby Park
				Attendance: 5,000

15 February 1908 Scottish First Division	Hearts	2–2	Morton	Tynecastle Park
				Attendance: 8,000

29 February 1908 Scottish First Division	Rangers	2–1	Hearts	Ibrox Park
				Attendance: 4,000

7 March 1908 Scottish First Division	Hearts	1–2	Third Lanark	Tynecastle Park
				Attendance: 6,000

14 March 1908 Scottish First Division	Hearts	0–3	Motherwell	Tynecastle Park
				Attendance: 5,000

28 March 1908 Scottish First Division	Hamilton Academical	2–1	Hearts	Douglas Park
				Attendance: 3,000

4 April 1908 Scottish First Division	Hearts	1–2	Hibernian	Tynecastle Park
				Attendance: 5,500

11 April 1908 Scottish First Division	Hearts	2–0	Airdrieonians	Tynecastle Park
				Attendance: 5,500

18 April 1908 Scottish First Division	Hearts	1–0	Clyde	Tynecastle Park
				Attendance: 5,000

20 April 1908 Scottish First Division	Celtic	6–0	Hearts	Celtic Park
				Attendance: 5,000

29 April 1908 Scottish First Division	Queen's Park	6–3	Hearts	Hampden Park
				Attendance: 3,000

== See also ==
- List of Heart of Midlothian F.C. seasons
