= Adam Fleming (footballer) =

Scottish footballer

Personal information
- Full name: Adam Fleming
- Place of birth: Scotland
- Position: Left back

Senior career*
Years	Team	Apps	(Gls)
1918–1919	Hibernian	3	(0)
1919	Dundee	2	(0)
1921–1922	Bathgate	18	(0)
- * Club domestic league appearances and goals

Adam Fleming was a Scottish footballer who played in the Scottish League for Bathgate, Hibernian and Dundee as a left back.

== Personal life ==
Fleming's brothers John and William were both footballers.

== Career statistics ==
Appearances and goals by club, season and competition
Club	Season	League			Scottish Cup		Total	
Club	Season	Division	Apps	Goals	Apps	Goals	Apps	Goals
Hibernian	1918–19	Scottish First Division	3	0	—		3	0
Dundee	1919–20	Scottish First Division	2	0	0	0	2	0
Bathgate	1921–22	Scottish Second Division	18	0	1	0	19	0
Career total			23	0	1	0	24	0
