= David Taylor (footballer, born 1889) =

English footballer

Personal information
- Full name: David William Taylor
- Date of birth: 8 April 1889
- Place of birth: Shrewsbury, England
- Date of death: 9 February 1946 (aged 56)
- Place of death: Monkseaton, England
- Height: 5 ft 10 in (1.78 m)
- Position: Full back

Senior career*
Years	Team	Apps	(Gls)
190?–1909	Newcastle East End		
1909–1910	Hull City	0	(0)
1910–1911	Darlington		(1)
1911–1914	Heart of Midlothian	89	(0)
1914–19??	Bristol Rovers	26	(0)
191?–1919	Walker Celtic		
1919–1921	Darlington		(1)
1921–1922	Blyth Spartans		
1922–1923	Shildon		
1923–192?	Scotswood		
- * Club domestic league appearances and goals

David William Taylor (8 April 1889 – 9 February 1946) was an English footballer who played as a full back in the Scottish League for Heart of Midlothian. He also played for Newcastle East End of the Northern Alliance, North-Eastern League clubs Darlington (two separate spells), Blyth Spartans, Shildon and Scotswood, and for Bristol Rovers of the Southern League. He was registered with Football League club Hull City without playing for their first team.

== Early and personal life ==
Taylor was born in Shrewsbury, Shropshire, on 8 April 1889, the son of David Taylor, a gas stoker, and his wife Eliza. The family moved to the Newcastle upon Tyne area when Taylor was very young. He attended St Anthony's School. The 1911 Census lists the 21-year-old Taylor living in his parents' home in the St Anthony's district of Walker and employed as an electrical storekeeper's clerk. In June 1913, at St Anthony's Parish Church, he married Margaret (Maggie) Lamb, whom the census recorded as a 23-year-old chemist's assistant.

As an adult, Taylor stood 5 ft 10 in (1.78 m) in height, and was powerfully built. He had a slight speech impediment, but sang well and enjoyed doing so.

== Football career ==
Taylor had been playing Northern Alliance football for Newcastle East End when he signed for Football League Second Division club Hull City ahead of the 1909–10 season. He played for Hull's reserves in the Midland League, but never for the first team, and was transfer-listed at the end of the season. He made an unsuccessful application to the Football League for a reduction in the fee, before Tom McIntosh brought him to Darlington of the North-Eastern League early in the 1910–11 season. He established himself in the team, and helped them progress from the first qualifying round of the 1910–11 FA Cup through ten matches to reach the third round proper (last 16), setting a club record that was equalled but, as of 2020, not broken. They eliminated First Division team Sheffield United and Second Division side Bradford Park Avenue on the way, and eventually lost to Swindon Town, who finished the season as Southern League champions. According to a profile in the Athletic News, he was "strong and free in tackling, has good speed, and drives powerfully. A stumbling block to the cleverest forward, and quick in all that he does." It also suggested he had attracted considerable interest from clubs in both divisions of the Football League, and had established a reputation as "the best left back in the North-Eastern League".

At the end of the season, Taylor moved on to Heart of Midlothian of the Scottish First Division, a club with a significant number of English players. He made his debut on 26 August 1911, standing in at right back for Tom Hegarty in a 3–0 win away to Queens Park. That was his last appearance until mid-November, when he came into the side at a more customary left back, and played regularly until the end of the season. He helped Hearts finish fourth in the league and reach the semifinal of the 1911–12 Scottish Cup, in which they lost to Celtic. Taylor missed only one match the following season as Hearts finished third and again lost in the Scottish Cup semifinal, this time to Falkirk. In 1913–14, he was ever-present for the first 29 matches of the season, but after a mistake against Kilmarnock led to a defeat that ended Hearts' chances of winning the league, he was left out for five matches in favour of the young Duncan Currie. An Athletic News profile of Tom McIntosh cited the "magnificent service" rendered by Taylor to Hearts as one example of the newly appointed Everton manager's "rare intelligence and judgment in signing up young and promising players".

After three years north of the border, Taylor was unable to agree terms for a fourth season with Hearts. He returned to England and signed for Bristol Rovers of the Southern League in what the Western Daily Press dubbed a "sensational capture" for a club record fee, of which the player would receive a share. One of four new signings for the 1914–15 season, he saw off competition from Bert Bennett for the left-back position, and completed the season with 26 Southern League appearances, after which competitive football was suspended for the duration of the war.

Although league competition did not resume until the 1919–20 season, the Northumberland Association ran some of its cup competitions in 1918–19, and Taylor captained Walker Celtic to victory in that season's Northumberland Senior Cup. His former club, Darlington, had effectively folded during the war; a successor, Darlington Forge Albion, represented the town in the 1919 Northern Victory League. When competitive football resumed, Forge Albion's player-manager Jack English assembled what the Sunderland Daily Echo's season preview dubbed a "team of all the talents", including many well-known pre-war players of whom Taylor was one, to take Darlington's place (and adopt its name) in the North-Eastern League. Taylor played regularly as Darlington finished as runners-up in the 1919–20 North-Eastern League, reached the second round proper of the FA Cup in 1920–21, and won that season's North-Eastern League title, an achievement which ensured their inclusion among the teams invited to form the Football League Third Division North for 1921–22. Bristol Rovers, who still held Taylor's registration, had been admitted to the League the previous season, and the management committee ruled that Taylor was jointly owned by both clubs. He appeared for neither.

Having denied suggestions of retirement, Taylor returned to North-Eastern League football, first with Blyth Spartans, whom he captained to third place in the 1921–22 season. He spent the following season with Shildon, and later played for Scotswood.

== Later life ==
Taylor suffered an attack of sleepy sickness in 1924. Complications ensued, and in December 1926 his local newspaper, the Blyth News, reported him to be a "confirmed cripple". In February 1932, that newspaper's pseudonymous "Crofter" wrote of his sadness at the contrast between his "vivid recollection of Dave Taylor as the vigorous, enthusiastic, and calculating player, and the happy, singing companion" and "the helpless invalid of whom affliction has exacted a terrible toll". In May, a benefit match was held for him between Newcastle United and an eleven including players from some of his former clubs, including Hearts and Darlington, as well as from Queen's Park. It was played on Walker Celtic's ground in front of some 2,000 spectators, and former England international Stan Seymour performed a ceremonial kick-off. The Shields Daily News reported that "Taylor, who has been an invalid for years, watched the game whilst sitting in a car."

The 1939 Register listed him as a "shipyard clerk – incapacitated", living with his wife and her older sister Hannah in Princes Gardens, Monkseaton. He died at that address on 9 February 1946 at the age of 56.

== Career statistics ==
Appearances and goals by club, season and competition
Club	Season	League			FA Cup		Total	
Club	Season	Division	Apps	Goals	Apps	Goals	Apps	Goals
Darlington	1910–11	North-Eastern League	(Note: The cited source lists goalscorers but not lineups for matches in the North-Eastern League.)	1	11	0	11	1
Heart of Midlothian	1911–12	Scottish Division One	24	0	7	0	31	0
Heart of Midlothian	1912–13	Division One	33	0	4	0	37	0
Heart of Midlothian	1913–14	Division One	32	0	1	0	33	0
Heart of Midlothian	Total		89	0	12	0	101	0
Bristol Rovers	1914–15	Southern League Division One	26	0	(Note: The cited source lists only Southern League appearances.)		26	0
Darlington	1919–20	North-Eastern League		1	5	0	5	1
Darlington	1920–21	North-Eastern League		0	3	0	3	0
Darlington	Total			1	8	0	8	1
Career total			115	2	31	0	146	2
