= John Fleming (footballer, born 1889) =

Scottish footballer

Personal information
- Full name: John Barr Murray Fleming
- Date of birth: 27 December 1889
- Place of birth: Slamannan, Scotland
- Date of death: 21 March 1916 (aged 26)
- Place of death: Richmond Camp, England
- Height: 5 ft 8 in (1.73 m)
- Positions: Right half; forward

Senior career*
Years	Team	Apps	(Gls)
1907–1908	Musselburgh Union		
1908–1909	Bonnyrigg Rose Athletic		
1909–1911	St Bernard's	30	(19)
1911–1913	Newcastle United	4	(0)
1913–1915	Tottenham Hotspur	19	(3)
1915	Armadale		
1915	Rangers	4	(1)
- * Club domestic league appearances and goals

John Barr Murray Fleming (27 December 1889 – 21 March 1916) was a Scottish professional footballer who played in the Scottish League for St Bernard's and Rangers as a right half and forward. He also played in the Football League for Tottenham Hotspur and Newcastle United.

== Personal life ==
Fleming's brothers Adam and William were both footballers. He served as a lance corporal in the Queen's Own Cameron Highlanders during the First World War and died of pneumonia at Richmond Camp on 21 March 1916. Fleming was buried in Inveresk Parish Churchyard.

== Career statistics ==
Appearances and goals by club, season and competition
Club	Season	League			National cup (Note: Includes Scottish Cup, FA Cup)		Total	
Club	Season	Division	Apps	Goals	Apps	Goals	Apps	Goals
Newcastle United	1912–13	First Division	4	0	0	0	4	0
Tottenham Hotspur	1913–14	First Division	8	1	0	0	8	1
Tottenham Hotspur	1914–15	First Division	11	2	0	0	11	2
Tottenham Hotspur	Total		19	3	0	0	19	3
Rangers	1915–16	Scottish First Division	4	1	—		4	1
Career total			27	4	0	0	27	4
