= Peter Pursell =

Scottish footballer

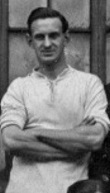
- Pursell in a Port Vale squad photo in 1919

Personal information
- Full name: Peter Pursell
- Date of birth: 1 July 1894
- Place of birth: Campbeltown, Scotland
- Date of death: 14 August 1968 (aged 74)
- Place of death: Glasgow, Scotland
- Height: 5 ft 9 1/2 in (1.77 m)
- Position: Defender

Youth career
- Campbeltown Academicals

Senior career*
| Years | Team | Apps | (Gls) |
| 1913–1914 | Queens Park | 16 | (0) |
| 1914–1919 | Rangers | 128 | (1) |
| 1919–1924 | Port Vale | 162 | (0) |
| 1924–1926 | Wigan Borough | 35 | (0) |
- Congleton Town
| Total | | 341 | (1) |

International career
| 1914 | Scotland | 1 | (0) |

Managerial career
- Congleton Town
- Dordrecht
- * Club domestic league appearances and goals

Peter Pursell (1 July 1894 – 14 August 1968) was a Scottish footballer. A defender, he won one cap for Scotland in 1914. He was the younger brother of Robert Russell Pursell and the father of Robert Wilson Pursell.

He began his senior career at Queens Park before joining Rangers in 1914. He helped the club to the league title in 1917–18 and 1918–19 before he signed with English club Port Vale for a £2,500 fee in August 1919. He spent five years with the Vale before joining Wigan Borough for two years. He later became player-manager at non-League side Congleton Town and then manager at Dutch club Dordrecht.

== Club career ==
=== Queens Park ===
Pursell played for Campbeltown Academicals and played for one season with Queens Park. He made his Scottish Division One debut on 16 August 1913, in a 4–0 defeat at Dumbarton. He featured 21 times throughout the 1913–14 campaign.

=== Rangers ===
He joined Rangers in 1914. He made 31 appearances in 1914–15, as the club finished third in Scottish Division One. He played 20 games in 1915–16, as the Gers finished second behind Old Firm rivals Celtic. The Ibrox Park club again finished third in 1916–17, before winning the league title in 1917–18, with Pursell making 24 appearances. He featured 23 times in 1918–19, as Rangers retained the league title.

=== Port Vale ===
He joined Port Vale for a £2,500 fee in August 1919. When Vale were elected to the Football League two months later, the club had to fork out an extra £500 to Rangers for the services of Pursell and Willie Aitken. He played 49 of the club's 51 games in 1919–20, and also helped Vale to lift the Staffordshire Senior Cup and North Staffordshire Infirmary Cup. He played alongside brother Bob in 1920–21, making 34 Second Division appearances. He featured 32 times in 1921–22, though his brother was forced to retire with a broken leg. Pursell featured 42 times in 1922–23 and 25 times in 1923–24, before leaving the Old Recreation Ground for Wigan Borough at the end of the campaign. Pursell played 183 matches for the Vale without finding the net.

=== Wigan Borough ===
He played 35 Third Division North games for Wigan, helping the club to finish 11th in 1924–25 and 17th in 1925–26.

== International career ==
Pursell received his sole Scotland cap on 28 February 1914, in a British Home Championship match against Wales which ended in a 0–0 draw.

== Managerial career ==
After leaving Wigan Borough, Pursell became player-manager of Congleton Town and also managed Dutch club Dordrecht.

== Career statistics ==
Appearances and goals by club, season and competition
| Club | Season | League | | | National cup (Note: Includes Scottish Cup, FA Cup) | | Total | |
| Club | Season | Division | Apps | Goals | Apps | Goals | Apps | Goals |
|---|---|---|---|---|---|---|---|---|
| Queens Park | 1913–14 | Scottish Division One | 16 | 0 | 5 | 0 | 21 | 0 |
| Rangers | 1914–15 | Scottish Division One | 31 | 0 | 2 | 0 | 33 | 0 |
| Rangers | 1915–16 | Scottish Division One | 20 | 0 | 3 | 0 | 23 | 0 |
| Rangers | 1916–17 | Scottish Division One | 30 | 1 | 2 | 0 | 32 | 1 |
| Rangers | 1917–18 | Scottish Division One | 24 | 0 | 3 | 0 | 27 | 0 |
| Rangers | 1918–19 | Scottish Division One | 23 | 0 | 3 | 0 | 26 | 0 |
| Rangers | Total | | 128 | 1 | 13 | 0 | 141 | 1 |
| Port Vale | 1919–20 | Second Division | 33 | 0 | 2 | 0 | 35 | 0 |
| Port Vale | 1920–21 | Second Division | 34 | 0 | 1 | 0 | 35 | 0 |
| Port Vale | 1921–22 | Second Division | 30 | 0 | 1 | 0 | 31 | 0 |
| Port Vale | 1922–23 | Second Division | 41 | 0 | 1 | 0 | 42 | 0 |
| Port Vale | 1923–24 | Second Division | 24 | 0 | 0 | 0 | 24 | 0 |
| Port Vale | Total | | 162 | 0 | 5 | 0 | 167 | 0 |
| Wigan Borough | 1924–25 | Third Division North | 32 | 0 | 1 | 0 | 33 | 0 |
| Wigan Borough | 1925–26 | Third Division North | 3 | 0 | 0 | 0 | 3 | 0 |
| Wigan Borough | Total | | 35 | 0 | 1 | 0 | 36 | 0 |
| Career total | | | 341 | 1 | 24 | 0 | 365 | 1 |

== Honours ==
Rangers

- Scottish Football League: 1917–18, 1918–19

Port Vale

- Staffordshire Senior Cup: 1920
- North Staffordshire Infirmary Cup: 1920, 1922
