= 1918–19 Hibernian F.C. season =

Hibernian
1918–19 season
- Manager: Dan McMichael (to February); Davy Gordon (from February)
- Scottish First Division: 20th
- Victory Cup: SF
- Average home league attendance: 13,721 (down 618)

During the 1918–19 season Hibernian, a football club based in Edinburgh, finished twentieth out of 18 clubs in the Scottish First Division.

== Scottish Football League ==
Match Day	Date	Opponent	H/A	Score	Hibernian Scorer(s)	Attendance
1	17 August	Celtic	H	0–3		10,000
2	24 August	Hamilton Academical	A	0–1		5,000
3	31 August	Third Lanark	H	1–5		8,000
4	7 September	Kilmarnock	A	1–7		10,000
5	14 September	Motherwell	A	0–0		5,000
6	21 September	Clydebank	H	1–2		5,000
7	28 September	Queen's Park	A	0–3		10,000
8	5 October	Morton	H	0–3		5,000
9	12 October	Clyde	A	1–2		4,000
10	19 October	Heart of Midlothian	H	1–3		3,000
11	26 October	Airdrieonians	H	2–1		5,000
12	2 November	Ayr United	A	0–5		2,000
13	9 November	St Mirren	H	1–2		4,000
14	23 November	Dumbarton	A	0–4		1,500
15	30 November	Clyde	H	3–1		5,000
16	7 December	Rangers	A	1–5		12,000
17	14 December	Falkirk	H	2–1		7,000
18	21 December	Motherwell	H	0–3		6,000
19	28 December	Celtic	A	0–2		10,000
20	4 January	Kilmarnock	H	1–4		5,000
21	11 January	Heart of Midlothian	A	1–3		12,000
22	18 January	Partick Thistle	H	0–2		6,000
23	25 January	Rangers	H	1–2		12,000
24	1 February	Falkirk	A	1–1		5,000
25	8 February	Dumbarton	H	1–0		8,000
26	15 February	Morton	A	2–9		1,000
27	22 February	Hamilton Academical	H	1–2		7,000
28	8 March	Ayr United	H	0–1		8,000
29	22 March	Third Lanark	A	2–4		4,000
30	5 April	Clydebank	A	1–2		2,000
31	21 April	Partick Thistle	A	0–2		4,000
32	26 April	Queen's Park	H	1–0		6,000
33	3 May	St Mirren	A	1–3		2,000
34	10 May	Airdrieonians	A	3–3		1,000

=== Final League table ===
P	Team	Pld	W	D	L	GF	GA	GD	Pts
16	Clyde	34	7	6	21	45	75	–30	20
16	Falkirk	34	6	8	20	46	73	–27	20
18	Hibernian	34	5	3	26	30	91	–61	13

=== Victory Cup ===
Round	Date	Opponent	H/A	Score	Hibernian Scorer(s)	Attendance
R2	15 March	Ayr United	H	1–0		
R3	29 March	Motherwell	H	2–0		
SF	12 April	St Mirren	H	1–3		

== See also ==
- List of Hibernian F.C. seasons
