= Andy Walker (footballer, born 1891) =

Scottish footballer

Personal information
- Date of birth: 29 May 1891
- Place of birth: Newbattle, Midlothian, Scotland
- Date of death: 27 May 1964 (aged 72)
- Place of death: Los Angeles, California, U.S.
- Position: Centre half

Senior career*
| Years | Team | Apps | (Gls) |
| –1913 | Dundee | | |
| 1913–1920 | Chelsea | 18 | (2) |
- * Club domestic league appearances and goals

Andrew Walker (29 May 1891 – 27 May 1964) was a Scottish footballer who played for Dundee and Chelsea. He was a versatile player who played in the midfield and as a forward.

== Honours ==
Chelsea

- FA Cup runner-up: 1914–15
