= Clyde Skene =

Scottish footballer

Personal information
- Full name: Clydesdale Duncan Skene
- Date of birth: 24 June 1884
- Place of birth: Larbert, Scotland
- Date of death: 29 December 1945 (aged 61)
- Place of death: Eynsham, England
- Position: Centre forward

Senior career*
Years	Team	Apps	(Gls)
- Falkirk Amateurs
- Stenhousemuir
1903–1906	Queen's Park	5	(1)
1907–1909	Falkirk	51	(39)
1909–1911	Queen's Park	20	(7)
1911–1912	Falkirk	0	(0)
1912–1913	Stenhousemuir		
1913–1914	Dundee	12	(7)
1914–	Dunfermline Athletic		
–1915	Montrose		
- * Club domestic league appearances and goals

Clydesdale Duncan Skene MM (24 June 1884 – 29 December 1945) was a Scottish amateur footballer who played in the Scottish League for Falkirk, Queen's Park and Dundee as a centre forward.

== Personal life ==
Skene was the younger brother of fellow footballer Leslie Skene and attended Falkirk High School. He served as a corporal in the Royal Field Artillery during the First World War and was awarded the Military Medal for bravery in the field.

== Career statistics ==
Appearances and goals by club, season and competition
Club	Season	League			Scottish Cup		Other		Total	
Club	Season	Division	Apps	Goals	Apps	Goals	Apps	Goals	Apps	Goals
Queen's Park	1903–04	Scottish First Division	1	0	0	0	0	0	1	0
Queen's Park	1904–05	Scottish First Division	4	1	0	0	0	0	4	1
Queen's Park	Total		5	1	0	0	0	0	5	1
Falkirk	1906–07	Scottish First Division	3	4	2	1	—		5	5
Falkirk	1907–08	Scottish First Division	28	23	4	0	—		32	23
Falkirk	1908–09	Scottish First Division	20	12	3	1	—		23	13
Falkirk	Total		51	39	9	2	—		60	41
Queen's Park	1909–10	Scottish First Division	16	6	3	1	1 (Note: Appearance in Glasgow Cup)	1	20	8
Queen's Park	1910–11	Scottish First Division	4	1	0	0	0	0	4	1
Queen's Park	Total		25	8	3	1	1	1	29	10
Falkirk	1910–11	Scottish First Division	0	0	1	0	—		1	0
Falkirk	Total		51	39	10	2	—		61	41
Dundee	1913–14	Scottish First Division	12	7	0	0	—		12	7
Career total			88	54	13	3	1	1	102	58

== Honours ==
Falkirk

- Falkirk Infirmary Shield: 1907–08
