= James Logan (footballer, born 1884) =

Scottish footballer (1884–1968)

Personal information
- Full name: James Lochhead Logan
- Date of birth: 12 September 1884
- Place of birth: Barrhead, Scotland
- Date of death: 1968 (aged 84)
- Place of death: Johnstone, Scotland
- Positions: Half back; left back

Senior career*
Years	Team	Apps	(Gls)
–1903	Barrhead Fereneze		
1903–1904	Queen's Park	44	(7)
1905–1912	Aston Villa	145	(10)
1912–1917	Rangers	113	(8)
- Partick Thistle
1917–1918	St Mirren	17	(1)
- Arthurlie

International career
1913	Scottish League XI	1	(0)
1916	Scotland (wartime)	1	(0)
- * Club domestic league appearances and goals

James Lochhead Logan (12 September 1884 – 1968) was a Scottish footballer who played as a half back or left back.

== Career ==
Logan is perhaps best remembered for his spells in English and Scottish League football with Aston Villa (seven seasons) and Rangers (five seasons), winning the national league title with both clubs and making over 100 appearances for each.

He represented the Scottish League XI once in 1913, and won one unofficial wartime appearance for Scotland in 1916.

== Personal life ==
Logan was born in Barrhead, Renfrewshire, in 1884 and died in Johnstone in 1968 at the age of 84. (Note: The death details given by the Queens Park historical site appear to be incorrect: the Probate Calendar shows Logan still alive in 1954 when his wife died. His death at the age of 84 was registered in 1968 in Johnstone, Renfrewshire, according to the statutory register of deaths accessed via ScotlandsPeople; this age is consistent with the date of birth as per the Queens Park site and with the statutory register of births. See Wikipedia talk:WikiProject Football/Archive 120#James H. Logan for lengthy discussion and further sources.)

He had two brothers who were also noted footballers: elder sibling Alec, a forward was a teammate of James at Aston Villa between 1907 and 1909 and also played for the Scottish League XI before being killed in the First World War; younger sibling Tommy, a defender, played in national cup finals with Falkirk in Scotland and Chelsea in England and received one full cap for Scotland.

== Career statistics ==
Appearances and goals by club, season and competition
Club	Season	League			National cup		Other		Total	
Club	Season	Division	Apps	Goals	Apps	Goals	Apps	Goals	Apps	Goals
Queen's Park	1903–04	Scottish Division One	23	3	1	0	1 (Note: Appearance in Glasgow Merchants Charity Cup.)	0	25	3
Queen's Park	1904–05	Scottish Division One	21	4	1	0	2 (Note: 1 appearance in Glasgow Cup, 1 appearance in Glasgow Merchants Charity Cup.)	0	24	4
Queen's Park	Total		44	7	2	0	3	0	49	7
Aston Villa	1905–06	First Division	7	0	4	0	—		11	0
Aston Villa	1906–07	First Division	28	1	2	0	—		30	1
Aston Villa	1907–08	First Division	37	7	3	1	—		40	8
Aston Villa	1908–09	First Division	28	0	1	0	—		29	0
Aston Villa	1909–10	First Division	16	0	0	0	—		16	0
Aston Villa	1910–11	First Division	14	2	1	0	—		15	2
Aston Villa	1911–12	First Division	15	0	2	0	—		17	0
Aston Villa	Total		145	10	13	1	—		158	11
Rangers	1912–13	Scottish Division One	24	1	3	0	4 (Note: 2 appearances in Glasgow Cup, 2 appearances in Glasgow Merchants Charity Cup.)	0	33	1
Rangers	1913–14	Scottish Division One	31	5	2	0	3 (Note: 2 appearances in Glasgow Cup,1 appearance in Glasgow Merchants Charity Cup.)	0	36	5
Rangers	1914–15	Scottish Division One	20	1	—		1 (Note: Appearances in Glasgow Cup.)	0	21	1
Rangers	1915–16	Scottish Division One	26	0	—		1	0	27	0
Rangers	1916–17	Scottish Division One	12	1	—		2	0	14	1
Rangers	Total		113	8	5	0	11	0	129	8
St Mirren	1917–18	Scottish Division One	17	1	—		—		17	1
Career total			319	26	20	1	14	0	353	27

== Honours ==
Aston Villa

- Football League First Division: 1909–10

Rangers

- Scottish League Division One: 1912–13
- Glasgow Cup: 1912, 1913
