= George Ormond =

Scottish footballer (1889–1980)

Personal information
- Full name: George Matthew Ormond
- Date of birth: 15 December 1889
- Place of birth: Arbroath, Scotland
- Date of death: 25 July 1980 (aged 90)
- Place of death: Greenock, Scotland
- Position: Left back

Senior career*
Years	Team	Apps	(Gls)
1911–1914	Rangers	53	(0)
1914–1920	Morton	179	(0)
1920–1921	Arbroath		
Total		232	(0)

International career
1917	Scottish League (wartime)	1	(0)
- * Club domestic league appearances and goals

George Matthew Ormond (15 December 1889 – 25 July 1980) was a Scottish footballer who played as a left back in the Scottish Football League for Rangers and Morton.

He won the Scottish league title in the 1911–12 and 1912–13 seasons with Rangers, and missed only one match for Morton when they finished runners-up in 1916–17, the highest position ever achieved by the Greenock club (they were also fourth and third in the two prior seasons and fourth and third again in the two following seasons, easily the strongest run in their history).

In knockout competitions, Rangers won the Glasgow Cup, then seen as an important trophy, in each of the three seasons Ormond was at Ibrox but he was not selected for any of the finals, with Andrew Richmond, John Robertson and Harry Muir selected on each occasion. However, Ormond did appear in two finals during World War I – the War Fund Shield was played for twice with Morton reaching the final both times, winning against Rangers in 1915 then losing to Celtic three years later. Ormond had left the club a short time before their greatest triumph, the Scottish Cup win (again over his previous employers Rangers) in 1921. He ended his career with a short spell with hometown club Arbroath, then playing outwith the SFL in the Scottish Football Alliance.

In 2018, Ormond's 1911–12 league winner's medal was sold at auction for £7,700.
