= Billy Hogg =

English footballer

Personal information
- Full name: William Hogg
- Date of birth: 29 May 1879
- Place of birth: Sunderland, England
- Date of death: 30 January 1937 (aged 57)
- Place of death: Sunderland, England
- Height: 5 ft 9 in (1.75 m)
- Position: Outside right

Youth career
- Walkergate Rangers
- Rosehill

Senior career*
| Years | Team | Apps | (Gls) |
- Willington Athletic
| 1899–1909 | Sunderland | 281 | (82) |
| 1909–1913 | Rangers | 109 | (45) |
| 1913–1914 | Dundee | 34 | (17) |
| 1914 | Raith Rovers | 0 | (0) |
| 1914–1920 | Dundee | 28 | (2) |
| 1920–1923 | Montrose | | |
| 1920–1921 | → Dundee (loan) | 2 | (1) |

International career
| 1902 | England | 3 | (0) |

Managerial career
- 1914: Raith Rovers
- * Club domestic league appearances and goals

William Hogg (29 May 1879 – 30 January 1937) was an English footballer who played at outside right, winning the Football League championship with Sunderland in 1901–02, before moving to Scotland where he won the Scottish League title three times with Rangers. He also made three appearances for England in 1902.

== Club career ==
=== Sunderland ===
Hogg was born in Sunderland and raised in Newcastle upon Tyne, and was playing local football with Willington Athletic when he was spotted by Sunderland where he became a professional in October 1899. He made his debut on 2 December 1899, scoring in a 5–0 victory over Notts County. He soon became a regular fixture in the outside-right berth and in his first season Sunderland finished third in the League, with Hogg having made 19 appearances with six goals.

The following season he was ever-present appearing in all 34 league matches, contributing nine goals as Sunderland finished as runners-up. In 1901–02 Hogg missed six games, but increased his goal tally to ten for the season, as Sunderland claimed the Championship by a three-point margin over Everton.

Hogg continued to score regularly for his club, and in 1903–04 he was the club's top-scorer with 12 goals.

Hogg remained with Sunderland until May 1909. In his final season with the Roker Park club, he scored two hat-tricks in a fortnight, the first away to Woolwich Arsenal on 21 November with the second coming on 5 December, in a 9–1 victory at St James' Park over bitter local rivals Newcastle United, with the other goals coming from George Holley (another hat-trick), Arthur Bridgett (two) and Jackie Mordue. Sunderland finished the 1908–09 season in third place, with Newcastle champions.

In his ten years with Sunderland, Hogg made a total of 303 appearances in all competitions, with 84 goals.

=== Rangers ===
In May 1909 he moved to Glasgow, where he joined Rangers for a fee of £100. In his first season at Ibrox, Rangers finished third in the Scottish League table, with Hogg contributing six goals from 29 appearances. In each of the next three seasons, Rangers won the title with Hogg contributing 14 goals from 30 appearances in 1910–11 and 20 goals from 30 appearances in 1911–12. In each of the three championship seasons, Rangers' top scorer was Scotland international Willie Reid.

By 1913, injuries were beginning to limit Hogg's input and he was only able to make 16 appearances (with five goals) eventually losing his place to Jimmy Paterson as Rangers claimed the title for the third consecutive season. He made 107 appearances for the club in the league and Scottish Cup, with 45 goals scored, and also claimed three Glasgow Cup winner's medals and one in the Glasgow Merchants Charity Cup.

=== Later career ===
He left Rangers at the end of the season, spending a year with Dundee before accepting the position of player-manager at Raith Rovers, but soon quit this following the outbreak of the First World War, during which he returned to Wearside to work in an engineering works. After the war Hogg went back to Scotland, coaching (and sometimes playing, now in his 40s) at Montrose until 1923, then worked as a coach at Wolverhampton Wanderers and Barnsley and was a licensee in the Sunderland area.

== International career ==
Hogg was selected for all England's matches in the 1902 British Home Championship, including the match against Scotland played at Ibrox Park on 5 April 1902 which was subsequently declared "void" after the collapse of a stand left 25 spectators dead and hundreds injured. England had played poorly in their opening matches, drawing 0–0 with Wales on 3 March 1902 and scrambling a 1–0 victory over Ireland on 22 March. Following the disaster at Ibrox, the Scotland fixture was relocated to Villa Park. The match was fiercely fought and ended with a 2–2 draw, sharing the points but giving the trophy to the Scots.

== Personal life ==
Billy Hogg's brother Jack Hogg was also a professional footballer: he was a half-back with Sunderland, Sheffield United and Southampton and Hartlepool United. Hogg's younger son William played with Bishop Auckland and Bradford City.

== Honours ==
Sunderland

- Football League champions: 1901–02

Rangers

- Scottish League champions: 1910–11, 1911–12, 1912–13
