= John Barbour (footballer) =

Scottish footballer (1890–1916)

Personal information
- Full name: John R. Barbour
- Date of birth: 1 September 1890
- Place of birth: Gorbals, Scotland
- Date of death: 15 July 1916 (aged 25)
- Place of death: High Wood, France
- Position: Inside right

Senior career*
Years	Team	Apps	(Gls)
- Glasgow Perthshire
1910–1913	Queen's Park	33	(8)
1913–1914	Dundee	16	(2)
1914	Preston North End	12	(2)

International career
- Scotland Schoolboys
- * Club domestic league appearances and goals

John R. Barbour (1 September 1890 – 15 July 1916) was a Scottish professional footballer who played as an inside right in the Scottish and English leagues for Queen's Park, Dundee and Preston North End.

== Personal life ==
Barbour attended Hutchesons' Grammar School and later worked in the audit office for a railway company, in addition to serving as a territorial. Barbour served as a lance corporal in the Highland Light Infantry during the First World War and was killed at High Wood during the Battle of the Somme on 15 July 1916. He is commemorated on the Thiepval Memorial.

== Career statistics ==
Appearances and goals by club, season and competition
Club	Season	League			National Cup		Other		Total	
Club	Season	Division	Apps	Goals	Apps	Goals	Apps	Goals	Apps	Goals
Queen's Park	1910–11	Scottish First Division	10	2	0	0	0	0	10	2
Queen's Park	1911–12	Scottish First Division	20	4	2	1	1 (Note: Appearance in Glasgow Cup)	1	23	6
Queen's Park	1912–13	Scottish First Division	3	0	0	0	1 (Note: Appearance in Glasgow Merchants Charity Cup)	0	4	0
Queen's Park	Total		33	6	2	1	2	1	37	8
Dundee	1913–14	Scottish First Division	16	2	1	0	—		17	2
Preston North End	1914–15	Second Division	12	2	0	0	—		12	2
Career total			61	10	3	1	2	1	66	12

== Honours ==
Preston North End

- Football League Second Division second-place promotion: 1914–15
