= George Chapman (footballer, born 1886) =

Scottish footballer

Personal information
- Full name: George R. Chapman
- Date of birth: 23 October 1886
- Place of birth: Broxburn, Scotland
- Date of death: Unknown
- Positions: Centre forward; centre half

Senior career*
Years	Team	Apps	(Gls)
	Raith Rovers	?	(?)
	Heart of Midlothian	?	(?)
1908–1910	Blackburn Rovers	67	(5)
1910–1911	Rangers	?	(?)
1911–1915	Blackburn Rovers	71	(29)
	Accrington Stanley	?	(?)
- * Club domestic league appearances and goals

George R. Chapman (born 23 October 1886, deceased) was a Scottish professional footballer. He initially played as a centre half during his early career before becoming a centre forward.

== Career ==
Born in Broxburn, he started his career with Raith Rovers and later assisted Heart of Midlothian. In 1908, Chapman moved to England to play for Blackburn Rovers in the Football League First Division and made 67 league appearances during two seasons with the club. He returned to Scotland in 1910 when he was signed by Rangers and spent one season with the Glasgow club. Chapman rejoined Blackburn in 1911 and remained with the Ewood Park club for the next four seasons, scoring 29 goals in 71 league matches. His time at Blackburn was curtailed by the outbreak of the First World War, which brought a halt to English competitive football in 1915. When competitive football recommenced, Chapman signed with Lancashire Combination side Accrington Stanley.

During the 1915–16 season, Chapman appeared as a guest player in three wartime matches for Burnley, in which he scored three goals.
