= Albert Bennett (cricketer) =

English cricketer

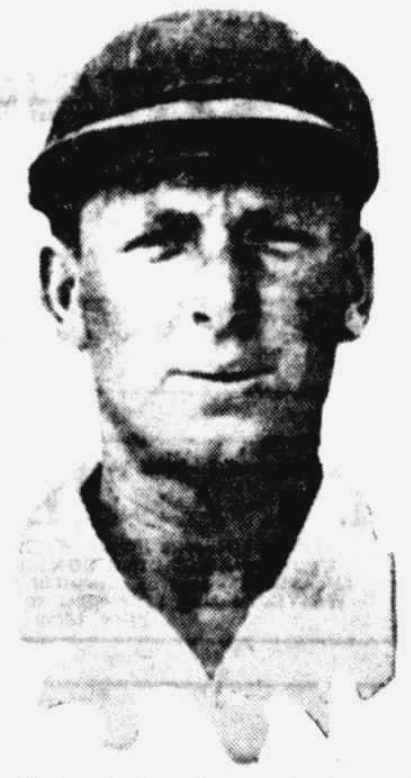
Albert Bennett.

Albert Bennett (21 May 1910 – 14 September 1985) was an English cricketer who was active from 1930 to 1936. He was born in St Helens and died in Wollongong. He made his first-class debut in 1930 and appeared in seventeen matches as a right-handed batsman who bowled leg break and googly, playing for New South Wales and Lancashire. He scored 254 runs with a highest score of 51 and took 24 wickets with a best performance of four for 49.
