= George Philip (footballer) =

Scottish footballer (1890–1968)

Personal information
- Full name: George Gregory Philip
- Date of birth: 1890
- Place of birth: Newport-on-Tay, Scotland
- Date of death: 1968 (aged 77–78)
- Place of death: Dundee, Scotland
- Height: 5 ft 9 in (1.75 m)
- Position: Forward

Senior career*
Years	Team	Apps	(Gls)
−	Dundee North End		
1910−1914	Dundee	70	(16)
1914−1920	Sunderland	37	(22)
1916	→ Rangers (loan)	1	(0)
1918−1919	→ Sheffield United (guest)		
1920–1921	Dundee	27	(0)
- * Club domestic league appearances and goals

George Gregory Philip (1890 – 1968) was a Scottish footballer who played mainly as a centre forward between 1910 and 1921.

Philip was born in Newport-on-Tay and began his playing career with Dundee, for whom he played in the Scottish Football League, usually as a centre-half (a goalkeeper of the same name was also in the squad in the same period). After a strong 1913–14 season, scoring 15 goals in 37 appearances, Sunderland paid a then club-record fee of £2,000 to sign Philip in 1914. Converting to play as a striker, Philip made an immediate impact, scoring 22 goals in 37 appearances in his first season.

With the outbreak of World War I, Philip served as a corporal in the British Army and made a number of guest appearances for Sheffield United while stationed in the area, as well as two appearances for Rangers. After the end of the war Philip returned to Sunderland but soon opted to head back to Dundee, with whom he played one further season before retiring.
