= Andrew Richmond (footballer) =

Scottish footballer (1882–??)

Personal information
- Full name: Andrew Richmond
- Date of birth: 20 January 1882
- Place of birth: Dennistoun, Scotland
- Position: Left back

Senior career*
| Years | Team | Apps | (Gls) |
| –1903 | Parkhead | | |
| 1903–1910 | Queen's Park | 164 | (7) |
| 1910–1913 | Rangers | 32 | (0) |
| 1913 | Queen's Park | 0 | (0) |

International career
| 1902–1903 | Scotland Juniors | 3 | (0) |
| 1906 | Scotland | 1 | (0) |
| 1909 | Scottish League XI | 2 | (0) |
- * Club domestic league appearances and goals

Andrew Richmond (born 20 January 1882; date of death unknown) was a Scottish footballer who made over 160 appearances as a left back in the Scottish League for Queen's Park. He also played for Rangers and was capped by Scotland at full international and junior level.

== Personal life ==
Richmond served as a corporal in the Royal Field Artillery during the First World War.

== Career statistics ==
Appearances and goals by club, season and competition
| Club | Season | League | | | Scottish Cup | | Other | | Total | |
| Club | Season | Division | Apps | Goals | Apps | Goals | Apps | Goals | Apps | Goals |
|---|---|---|---|---|---|---|---|---|---|---|
| Queen's Park | 1903–04 | Scottish First Division | 22 | 0 | 1 | 0 | 3 (Note: 2 appearances in Glasgow Cup, 1 appearance in Glasgow Merchants Charity Cup) | 0 | 26 | 0 |
| Queen's Park | 1904–05 | Scottish First Division | 18 | 2 | 1 | 0 | 2 (Note: 1 appearance in Glasgow Cup, 1 appearance in Glasgow Merchants Charity Cup) | 0 | 21 | 2 |
| Queen's Park | 1905–06 | Scottish First Division | 24 | 2 | 2 | 1 | 1 (Note: Appearances in Glasgow Cup) | 0 | 27 | 3 |
| Queen's Park | 1906–07 | Scottish First Division | 28 | 2 | 5 | 0 | 3 | 1 | 36 | 3 |
| Queen's Park | 1907–08 | Scottish First Division | 27 | 1 | 5 | 0 | 1 | 0 | 33 | 1 |
| Queen's Park | 1908–09 | Scottish First Division | 20 | 0 | 4 | 0 | 1 | 0 | 25 | 0 |
| Queen's Park | 1909–10 | Scottish First Division | 25 | 0 | 6 | 0 | 3 | 0 | 34 | 0 |
| Queen's Park | Total | | 164 | 7 | 24 | 1 | 14 | 1 | 202 | 9 |
| Rangers | 1910–11 | Scottish First Division | 20 | 0 | 1 | 0 | 6 (Note: 3 appearances in Glasgow Cup, 3 appearances in Glasgow Merchants Charity Cup) | 0 | 27 | 0 |
| Rangers | 1911–12 | Scottish First Division | 12 | 0 | 1 | 0 | 3 | 0 | 16 | 0 |
| Rangers | Total | | 32 | 0 | 2 | 0 | 9 | 0 | 43 | 0 |
| Career total | | | 196 | 7 | 26 | 1 | 23 | 1 | 245 | 9 |

== Honours ==
Rangers

- Scottish League First Division (2): 1910–11, 1911–12
- Glasgow Cup (2): 1910–11, 1911–12
- Glasgow Merchants Charity Cup (1): 1910–11
