= Harry Read (footballer) =

English footballer

Personal information
- Full name: William Henry Read
- Date of birth: 1 October 1885
- Place of birth: Blackpool, England
- Date of death: 1951 (aged 65–66)
- Position: Winger

Senior career*
Years	Team	Apps	(Gls)
1906–1907	Lytham		
1907–1909	Blackpool	30	(3)
1909	Colne		
1909–1911	Sunderland	4	(2)
1911–1912	Chelsea	3	(0)
1912–1913	Dundee		
1913–1919	Swansea Town		
1919–19??	Chesterfield Municipal		
- * Club domestic league appearances and goals

William Henry Read (1 October 1885 – 1951) was an English professional footballer who played as a winger for Sunderland.
