= Bert Bennett =

English footballer

Personal information
- Full name: Hubert Henry Bennett
- Date of birth: 1889 or 1890
- Place of birth: Oldbury-on-Severn, England
- Date of death: 22 July 1968 (aged 77–79)
- Place of death: Bristol, England
- Position: Full back

Youth career
- Thornbury Grammar School

Senior career*
Years	Team	Apps	(Gls)
1911–1915	Bristol Rovers	101	(0)
- * Club domestic league appearances and goals

Hubert Henry Bennett was a professional footballer who played as a full back for Bristol Rovers. He joined the club in 1911 and played 101 games in the Southern League without scoring, before losing his place in the team to David Taylor during the 1914–15 season. He retired from professional football in 1915.

Bennett played as an emergency goalkeeper on 26 April 1913 at Coventry City when goalie Harry Stansfield had to leave the field with an injury.

== Sources ==
- Byrne, Stephen; Jay, Mike (2003). Bristol Rovers Football Club - The Definitive History 1883-2003. Stroud: Tempus. pp. 99, 104 & 489. ISBN 0-7524-2717-2.
