= Navy and Army War Fund Shield =

War Fund Shield
- Founded: 1914
- Abolished: 1918
- Region: Scotland
- Number of teams: 8 (1914–15); 11 (1917–18)
- Last champions: Celtic (1st title)
- Most successful club(s): Celtic (1 title), Morton (1 title)

The War Fund Shield was a Scottish football competition that was contested twice in the spring of 1915 and then again in the spring of 1918 (the Navy and Army War Fund Shield as it then became known). The aim of these competitions was to raise money for the footballers and their families who fought in World War I.

== 1914–15 ==
=== Quarter–Finals ===
The first round matches took place between 20 October – 1 December 1914. Celtic and Partick Thistle went to a replay. Ibrox Park hosted Clyde against St Mirren.

- Third Lanark 0–4 Rangers
- Clyde 0–1 St Mirren
- Partick Thistle 1–1 Celtic
- Celtic 2–1 Partick Thistle (replay)
- Morton 3–0 Queen's Park

=== Semi–Finals ===
The first semi-final was a Renfrewshire derby on 8 December 1914. The second semi-final was an Old Firm derby held at Firhill a week later.

- Rangers 2–1 Celtic
- Morton 1–0 St Mirren

=== Final ===
The final was held at Firhill on 28 April 1915. The attendance was 15,000.

- Morton 2–1 Rangers

== 1917–18 ==
=== Qualifying round ===
The qualifying round matches were held between 9 March – 6 April 1918. St Mirren and Kilmarnock went to extra time.

- St Mirren 2–3 Kilmarnock (aet)
- Morton 3–1 Third Lanark
- Clydebank 2–1 Airdrieonians

=== Quarter–Finals^{1} ===
The first round matches were all held on 20 April 1918.

- Celtic 2–1 Queen's Park
- Rangers 3–0 Partick Thistle
- Morton 7–1 Kilmarnock
- Motherwell 1–2 Clydebank

^{1}Not all results were recorded and known

=== Semi–Finals ===
The semi-finals were held on 27 April 1918.

- Celtic 2–0 Clydebank
- Rangers 1–3 Morton

=== Final ===
The final was held at Hampden Park on 4 May 1918 and the attendance was 20,000.

- Celtic 1–0 Morton

== Aftermath ==
Although Celtic officially won the 1917–18 competition the trophy was not presented to them as it was not ready. The competition was supposed to be an annual event but since war had ended the competition was never played again. There is no evidence of Celtic ever being presented with a trophy.
