= Robert Campbell (footballer, born 1883) =

Scottish footballer

Personal information
- Full name: Robert Gordon Campbell
- Date of birth: 27 January 1883
- Place of birth: Ellon, Scotland
- Date of death: 31 May 1942 (aged 59)
- Place of death: Glasgow, Scotland
- Positions: Defender; forward

Senior career*
Years	Team	Apps	(Gls)
- Rutherglen Glencairn
1904–1905	Queen's Park	18	(1)
1905–1906	Celtic	11	(0)
1906–1914	Rangers	194	(54)
1914–1915	Kilmarnock	6	(3)
1915–1918	Ayr United	7	(0)
Total		236	(58)
- * Club domestic league appearances and goals

Robert Gordon Campbell (27 January 1883 – 31 May 1942) was a Scottish footballer who played with Celtic and Rangers, as well as Queen's Park, Kilmarnock and Ayr United.

== Career ==
In January 1906 Campbell joined Rangers from Celtic to help ease an injury crisis at Ibrox, and would go on to spend the best part of nine years at the club. He is one of a very small group to transfer directly between the Glasgow rivals, having only been at Celtic for only seven months after leaving Queen's Park in June 1905. He made his Rangers debut against Port Glasgow Athletic on 20 January 1906. He was a right back but in later years would convert to a forward. In the 1906–07 season, Campbell saw himself being played up front. His very first match in attack, a benefit match versus Morton, saw him score all seven of the goals in a 7–0 win. His partnership with Archie Kyle saw him score 13 goals that season. He finished the following two seasons as Rangers' top scorer with 25 and 17 goals respectively but he switched back to defence with the arrival of Willie Reid.

During his Rangers career he made 246 appearances in all competitions and scored 66 goals. He won three Scottish league championships, three Glasgow Cups, three Charity Cups and the Edinburgh Exhibition Cup in 1908.

Campbell was selected to play in the Glasgow FA's annual challenge match against Sheffield in 1908, but received no other representative honours. After his retirement he became a director of Rangers in 1926, a position he held until his death in 1942.

== Honours ==
Rangers

- Scottish Division One: 1910–11, 1911–12, 1912–13
- Glasgow Cup: 1910–11, 1911–12, 1912–13
- Edinburgh Exhibition Cup: 1908

== See also ==
- Played for Celtic and Rangers
