= 1911–12 in Scottish football =

Football in Scotland
- Season: 1911–12

1911–12 in Scottish football

Division One champions
- Rangers

Division Two champions
- Ayr United

Scottish Cup winners
- Celtic

Junior Cup winners
- Petershill

Scotland national team
- 1912 BHC

The 1911–12 season was the 39th season of competitive football in Scotland and the 22nd season of the Scottish Football League.

== League competitions ==
=== Scottish League Division One ===
Pos	Team	Pld	W	D	L	GF	GA	GD	Pts
1	Rangers (C)	34	24	3	7	86	34	+52	51
2	Celtic	34	17	11	6	58	33	+25	45
3	Clyde	34	19	4	11	56	32	+24	42
4	Heart of Midlothian	34	16	8	10	54	40	+14	40
5	Partick Thistle	34	16	8	10	47	40	+7	40
6	Morton	34	14	9	11	44	44	0	37
7	Falkirk	34	15	6	13	46	33	+13	36
8	Dundee	34	13	9	12	52	41	+11	35
9	Aberdeen	34	14	7	13	44	44	0	35
10	Airdrieonians	34	12	8	14	40	41	−1	32
11	Third Lanark	34	12	7	15	40	57	−17	31
12	Hamilton Academical	34	11	8	15	32	44	−12	30
13	Hibernian	34	12	5	17	44	47	−3	29
14	Motherwell	34	11	5	18	34	44	−10	27
15	Raith Rovers	34	9	9	16	39	59	−20	27
16	Kilmarnock	34	11	4	19	38	60	−22	26
17	Queen's Park	34	8	9	17	29	53	−24	25
18	St Mirren	34	7	10	17	32	59	−27	24

Source: "1911-1912 Division 1 - SPFL Archive". SPFL.
(C) Champions

Champions: Rangers

=== Scottish League Division Two ===
Pos	Team	Pld	W	D	L	GF	GA	GD	Pts
1	Ayr United (C)	22	16	3	3	54	24	+30	35
2	Abercorn	22	13	4	5	43	22	+21	30
3	Dumbarton	22	13	1	8	47	31	+16	27
4	Cowdenbeath	22	12	2	8	39	31	+8	26
5	St Johnstone	22	10	4	8	29	27	+2	24
6	St Bernard's	22	9	5	8	38	36	+2	23
7	Leith Athletic	22	9	4	9	31	34	−3	22
8	Arthurlie	22	7	5	10	30	30	0	19
9	East Stirlingshire	22	7	3	12	21	31	−10	17
10	Dundee Hibernian	22	5	5	12	21	41	−20	15
11	Albion Rovers	22	6	1	15	19	41	−22	13
11	Vale of Leven	22	6	1	15	26	50	−24	13

Source: statto.com
Rules for classification: Teams finish equal if level on points. Points system: 2 points for a win, 1 point for a draw, 0 points for a loss
(C) Champions

== Other honours ==
=== Cup honours ===
==== National ====
Competition	Winner	Score	Runner-up
Scottish Cup	Celtic	2 – 0	Clyde
Scottish Qualifying Cup	Dunfermline Athletic	1 – 0	Dumbarton
Scottish Consolation Cup	Johnstone	2 – 0	Galston
Scottish Junior Cup	Petershill	1 – 0	Denny Hibernian
Scottish Amateur Cup	Queen's Park Strollers (Note: The Strollers were the second XI of Queen's Park.)	2 – 0	Leith Amateurs

==== County ====
Competition	Winner	Score	Runner-up
Aberdeenshire Cup	Aberdeen	5 – 1	Portsoy
Ayrshire Cup	Ayr United	2 – 0	Hurlford
Dumbartonshire Cup	Dumbarton Harp	1 – 0 (Note: Third replay needed.)	Renton
East of Scotland Shield	Hibernian	2 – 0	St Bernard's
Fife Cup	Dunfermline Athletic	1 – 1 (Note: Second replay needed. Won on corners)	Cowdenbeath
Forfarshire Cup	Dundee	2 – 0	Brechin City
Glasgow Cup	Rangers	1 – 0	Partick Thistle
Lanarkshire Cup	Motherwell	1 – 0	Hamilton
Linlithgowshire Cup	Bathgate	5 – 2	Broxburn
Perthshire Cup	St Johnstone	w.o. (Note: Match awarded via walkover.)	Scone
Renfrewshire Cup	Morton	3 – 1 (Note: Aggregate over two legs.)	Arthurlie
Southern Counties Cup	Nithsdale Wanderers	1 – 0 (Note: Replay needed.)	Douglas Wanderers
Stirlingshire Cup	King's Park	1 – 0	Alloa Athletic

=== Non-league honours ===
Highland League

Top Three
Pos	Team	Pld	W	D	L	GF	GA	GD	Pts
1	Inverness Caledonian (Note: Finished first after play-offs.)	12	7	3	2	25	10	+15	17
2	Clachnacuddin	12	7	3	2	24	17	+7	17
3	Inverness Thistle	12	8	1	3	32	20	+12	17

Source: RSSSF

Other Senior Leagues

Division	Winner
Border Senior League	Selkirk (Division 1)
Border Senior League	Selkirk Woodburn (Division 2)
Central League	Dunfermline Athletic
Northern League	unfinished
Perthshire League	Tulloch
Scottish Union	Galston

== Scotland national team ==
Scotland shared the 1912 British Home Championship trophy with England.

Date	Venue	Opponents	Score	Competition	Scotland scorer(s)
2 March 1912	Tynecastle Park, Edinburgh	Wales	1–0	BHC	Jimmy Quinn
16 March 1912	Windsor Park, Belfast (A)	Ireland	4–1	BHC	Walter Aitkenhead (2), Willie Reid, Bobby Walker
23 March 1912	Hampden Park, Glasgow (H)	England	1–1	BHC	Unknown Scorer

Key:

- (H) = Home match
- (A) = Away match
- BHC = British Home Championship

Team	Pld	W	D	L	GF	GA	GD	Pts
England (C)	3	2	1	0	9	2	+7	5
Scotland (C)	3	2	1	0	6	2	+4	5
Ireland	3	1	0	2	5	12	−7	2
Wales	3	0	0	3	2	6	−4	0

Rules for classification: 1) points. The points system worked as follows: 2 points for a win and 1 point for a draw.
(C) Co-champions

== Other national teams ==
=== Scottish League XI ===
Date	Venue	Opponents	Score (Note: Scottish League XI's score is shown first.)	Scotland scorer(s)
2 October 1911	Glasgow (H)	(England) Southern League XI	3–2	
30 October 1911	Firhill, Glasgow (A)	(Northern Ireland) Irish League XI	3–0	
17 February 1912	Ayresome Park, Glasgow (A)	(England) Football League XI	0–2	

== See also ==
- 1911–12 Aberdeen F.C. season
