= Bill Montgomery (footballer, born 1885) =

Scottish footballer

Personal information
- Full name: William Montgomery
- Date of birth: 1885
- Place of birth: Gourock, Scotland
- Date of death: 21 November 1953 (aged 67–68)
- Place of death: Oakland, California, United States
- Position: Inside forward

Senior career*
Years	Team	Apps	(Gls)
1903–1904	Kilwinning Rangers		
1904–1905	Rutherglen Glencairn		
1905–1907	Bradford City	17	(3)
1907–1909	Sunderland	10	(2)
1909–1912	Oldham Athletic	70	(26)
1912	Rangers	7	(2)
1912–1916	Dundee	41	(4)
1915–1916	→ Stevenston United (loan)		
1916–1917	Ayr United	12	(1)
- * Club domestic league appearances and goals

William Montgomery (1885 – 21 November 1953) was a Scottish professional footballer who played as an inside forward for clubs including Sunderland, Oldham Athletic (where he was a member of the club's first campaign in the top tier of English football in 1910–11), Rangers (winning the Glasgow Cup and contributing to a Scottish Football League title in a spell of just a few months at Ibrox Stadium) Dundee and Ayr United.
