= Tommy Kelso =

Scottish footballer

Personal information
- Full name: Thomas Kelso
- Date of birth: 6 May 1882
- Place of birth: Renton, Scotland
- Date of death: 29 January 1974 (aged 91)
- Place of death: Helensburgh, Scotland
- Position: Full back

Senior career*
Years	Team	Apps	(Gls)
1904–1906	Third Lanark	21	(0)
1906–1912	Manchester City	139	(3)
1912–1914	Dundee	37	(5)
1914–1918	Rangers	22	(0)
1915–1917	→ Dumbarton (loan)	10	(0)
1918–1919	Dumbarton	2	(0)

International career
1914	Scotland	1	(0)
- * Club domestic league appearances and goals

Thomas Kelso (6 May 1882 – 29 January 1974) was a Scottish footballer who played as a full back for Manchester City between 1906 and February 1912.

Kelso started his career at Third Lanark before signing for Manchester City in 1906. He made his debut for Manchester City in September 1906 in a 4–1 defeat against Arsenal.

He made 139 league appearances for Manchester City and scored 3 goals. He subsequently returned to Scotland and played for Dundee, Rangers and Dumbarton.

He won one Scotland cap in 1914 in a 0–0 draw against Wales in the 1914 British Home Championship. His uncle Bob Kelso was also a Dundee player and a Scotland international.
