= John Goodwin (footballer) =

Scottish footballer

Personal information
- Full name: John Lawson Goodwin
- Date of birth: 3 June 1887
- Place of birth: Ayr, Scotland
- Date of death: 3 November 1954 (aged 67)
- Place of death: Glasgow, Scotland
- Position: Inside forward

Senior career*
Years	Team	Apps	(Gls)
–	Ayr Fort Juniors		
1908–1910	Ayr Parkhouse	36	(11)
1910	Ayr United	10	(3)
1910–1914	Rangers	47	(19)
1914–1915	Ayr United	33	(4)
1915	Kilmarnock	3	(0)
Total		129	(37)
- * Club domestic league appearances and goals

John Lawson Goodwin (3 June 1887 – 3 November 1954) was a Scottish footballer who played as an inside forward. He was a Scottish Football League champion in each of his first three seasons with Rangers between 1910–11 and 1912–13, also winning the Charity Cup in May 1911 and the Glasgow Cup five months later. He was not a first choice in his position but served as a capable stand-in when either Alec Bennett or Jimmy Bowie was unavailable.

Either side of his spell in Govan he played in his hometown, initially for Ayr Parkhouse (Note: Sources suggest he may have been with Celtic in the summer of 1908 prior to joining Ayr Parkhouse, but there is no evidence of any competitive appearances and this may have been on a trial basis or similar.) then for their successor after a merger, Ayr United, although his final matches in the senior leagues were with their local rivals Kilmarnock (Note: The record includes details of John Alexander Goodwin (a cousin) who played for Kilmarnock between 1912 and 1913.) – by that point World War I was worsening and it is likely his football career ended due to commitments relating to the conflict.

Goodwin's younger brother Alex also played for Ayr United, joining the club a few months after John moved to Rangers.
