= Jimmy Galt =

Scottish footballer (1885–1935)

Personal information
- Full name: James Hill Galt
- Date of birth: 11 August 1885
- Place of birth: Saltcoats, Scotland
- Date of death: 17 November 1935 (aged 50)
- Place of death: Whitecraigs, Scotland
- Position: Centre half

Senior career*
Years	Team	Apps	(Gls)
- Ardrossan Winton Rovers
–1906	Ardeer Thistle		
1906–1914	Rangers	185	(5)
1914–1916	Everton	32	(2)
1916	Partick Thistle	3	(0)
1920	Third Lanark	0	(0)
- Alloa Athletic

International career
1908	Scotland	2	(1)
1911–1912	Scottish League XI	2	(0)
1916	Scotland (wartime)	1	(1)
- * Club domestic league appearances and goals

James Hill Galt (11 August 1885 – 17 November 1935) was a Scottish professional footballer who played as a left half for Rangers and Everton.

== Club career ==
Galt played with Rangers for eight years between 1906 and 1914. He made 240 appearances and scored six goals for the club. During his time at Ibrox he won three Scottish league championships, two Glasgow Cups and three Glasgow Merchants Charity Cups, as well as the Edinburgh Exhibition Cup in 1908.

Galt swapped Glasgow for Merseyside in 1914 and joined Everton. He made 36 appearances for the Toffees and scored four goals. Despite captaining them to the First Division title, he left after only one season when World War I took hold and official football was suspended in England, returning to Scotland to play for Partick Thistle and Third Lanark. He guested for Fulham during the war.

== International career ==
Galt won his two Scotland caps in May 1908. He scored on his second appearance, against Ireland on 14 May. Galt also played and scored in one unofficial wartime international, against England on 13 May 1916.

== Military service ==
During the First World War he served with Army Service Corps and latterly the Argyll and Sutherland Highlanders as a Second Lieutenant. He was wounded in action, suffering severe shell-shock, which meant that he did not resume his football career to any great extent after the war ended.

== Personal life (military service) ==
Galt was also an accomplished golfer: he battled for the 'Scottish Professional Footballers Golf Championship' with Jimmy Lawson of Dundee who later switched sports to turn professional in the United States.

After retiring from football, Galt ran a series of billiard halls with ex-Rangers teammate Jimmy Gordon.

Sporting positions
Preceded by John Maconnachie	Everton captain 1914–1915	Succeeded by None (due to the suspension of the Football League during the First World War)
