= Joe Hendry (footballer) =

Scottish footballer (1886–1966)

Personal information
- Full name: Joseph Hendry
- Date of birth: 1886
- Place of birth: Greenock, Scotland
- Date of death: 1966 (aged 79–80)
- Place of death: Greenock, Scotland
- Position: Left half

Youth career
- 1906: Garvel Juveniles

Senior career*
Years	Team	Apps	(Gls)
1906–1907	Maryhill		
1907–1910	Morton	73	(2)
1910–1919	Rangers	148	(6)
1918–1919	Dumbarton	23	(2)
1919–1920	Third Lanark	20	(1)
1920–1922	St Johnstone		
1922–1923	Distillery		
Total		264	(11)

International career
1910	Scottish Football League XI	1	(0)
- * Club domestic league appearances and goals

Joseph Hendry (1886–1966) was a Scottish footballer who played as a left half. He featured for Rangers, Morton and Third Lanark amongst other clubs during his career.

== Football career ==
Hendry began playing football with Maryhill. He joined Greenock Morton in December 1907 and stayed there until signing for Rangers in April 1910. Hendry made his debut in a 1–0 win at home against Clyde at the end of that month, and during his eight-year spell with the Gers, made 172 appearances and scored 8 goals. He won three Scottish Football League titles in succession in the 1910–11, 1911–12 and 1912–13 seasons, adding winner's medals from the Glasgow Cup in the first two of those campaigns, but played less as World War I escalated, spending his final year registered at Ibrox on loan at Dumbarton.

After leaving Rangers he had spells with Third Lanark, St Johnstone (then playing outside the SFL) and at Northern Irish club Distillery.

== Later career ==
After retiring in 1923, Hendry began a service to provide commentaries for blind fans which was probably the first such service in the country. In 2019, his 1911 league medal sold for £2,400 at auction.
