= Jimmy Gordon (footballer, born 1888) =

Scottish footballer

Personal information
- Full name: James Eadie Gordon
- Date of birth: 23 July 1888
- Place of birth: Saltcoats, Scotland
- Date of death: 22 November 1954 (aged 66)
- Place of death: Glasgow, Scotland
- Position: Right half

Youth career
- Thornwood Athletic
- Renfrew Victoria

Senior career*
Years	Team	Apps	(Gls)
1907–1920	Rangers	315	(64)
- → Fulham (guest)
1917	→ Heart of Midlothian (guest)	1	(0)
1920–1923	Dunfermline Athletic	25	(3)

International career
1909–1920	Scottish League XI	14	(2)
1912–1920	Scotland	10	(0)
1919	Scotland (wartime)	4	(0)
- * Club domestic league appearances and goals

James Eadie Gordon (23 July 1888 – 22 November 1954) was a Scottish footballer who spent most of his career with Rangers. During the First World War, he was a sergeant in the Highland Light Infantry.

== Career ==
Born in Saltcoats, Ayrshire, Gordon played with juvenile side Thornwood Athletic and junior club Renfrew Victoria (being selected for the Scotland team at that level) before joining Rangers during the 1906–07 season. He stayed with the Ibrox club until 1920, playing 315 Scottish Football League games and winning five championships in the process (388 appearances including all cups of the time). Versatile enough to play in any position on the pitch, he did just that playing in goal, in defence, in midfield and up front for Rangers.

His favoured role was right-half and this was the position he occupied most during his international career with the Scotland national team, which extended to ten caps between 1912 and 1920. Gordon also represented the Scottish League XI 14 times, (Note: The source lists 15 matches, but a cap in 1912 is counted twice; Gordon did play, but William Walker was omitted.) played in four unofficial wartime internationals and took part in an unofficial Scottish tour of North America in 1921.

Gordon "guested" for Fulham and Hearts during World War I and joined Dunfermline Athletic when he finally left Rangers in 1920. After his playing retirement, he and former Rangers colleague Jimmy Galt ran a series of billiard halls. He was included in the Rangers F.C. Hall of Fame on 5 February 2007.

== See also ==
- List of Scotland national football team captains
- List of Scotland wartime international footballers
