= William Wilton =

Scottish footballer, administrator and manager

Personal information
- Full name: William Wilton
- Date of birth: 9 June 1865
- Place of birth: Largs, Ayrshire, Scotland
- Date of death: 2 May 1920 (aged 54)
- Place of death: Gourock, Renfrewshire, Scotland

Managerial career
- Years: Team
- 1899–1920: Rangers

William Wilton (9 June 1865 – 2 May 1920) was a Scottish football player, administrator and manager. He was the first manager of Rangers Football Club, serving in that position from 1899 until his death in 1920, and leading Rangers to nine major trophies. He had previously served as Rangers' match secretary to the reserve and first teams.

== Early life ==
William Wilton was born at Blyth's Land on Nelson Street in Largs, Ayrshire on 9 June 1865, the son of James Wilton, a stonemason from the Isle of Arran, and Janet Smith, a weaver from Paisley. Wilton grew up in Largs and the Kingston area of Glasgow, and worked in Glasgow as a mercantile clerk with a sugar broker and then a sugar refining machinery manufacturer.

== Career ==
Wilton joined the club in September 1883 as a player but never progressed beyond the second string eleven. He was soon appointed secretary to the club's youth team and reserve side. He was also on the special committee that oversaw the club's move from Kinning Park to the first Ibrox ground in 1887.

Wilton became match secretary of the first team in 1889, succeeding James Gossland. The club shared the inaugural Scottish League title in 1891. Wilton had been appointed as the league's first treasurer at the start of the season. In his decade as match secretary for the first team, the club won two Scottish league championships in 1891 and 1899, as well as three Scottish Cups in 1894, 1897 and 1898. He also won four Glasgow Cups in 1893, 1894, 1897 and 1898, and a Glasgow Merchants Charity Cup in 1897. Rangers had achieved the first ever 100% league record, winning all 18 games and scoring 79 goals in 1898–99; to date no team has achieved the same, although several teams have gone unbeaten in a league season since.

When the club became a limited company in 1899, Wilton was chosen as manager. Under his stewardship as manager, Rangers won eight league championships and another Scottish Cup, nine Glasgow Cups and seven Charity Cups. He also guided the club's move to the second (extant) Ibrox Park in 1899 and its response to the disaster at that venue three years later. In his final season as manager the club won its tenth league championship. Wilton died in a boating accident in May 1920. He was Rangers manager in 881 matches (not including his earlier spell as secretary), of which they won 553. He is buried at Cathcart Cemetery in East Renfrewshire.

== Managerial statistics ==
Team	Nation	From	To	Record							
Team	Nation	From	To	G	W	D	L	F	A	GD	Win %
Rangers	Scotland	28th May 1889	15th June 1920	1,090	688	183	219	2,675	1,261	+1,414	63.12
Total				1,090	668	183	219	2,675	1,261	+1,414	63.12

As of 25 June 2023

=== Honours ===
Rangers

- Scottish League (8): 1899–1900; 1900–01; 1910–11; 1911–12; 1912–13; 1917–1918; 1919–20
- Scottish Cup: 1902–03
