= Jimmy Paterson =

Scottish doctor and footballer

Personal information
- Full name: James Alexander Paterson
- Date of birth: 9 May 1891
- Place of birth: Chelsea, England
- Date of death: 31 August 1959 (aged 68)
- Place of death: Newmilns, Scotland
- Height: 5 ft 6 1/2 in (1.69 m)
- Position: Outside left

Youth career
- Queen's Park

Senior career*
Years	Team	Apps	(Gls)
1910–1916	Rangers	120	(27)
1919–1920	Rangers	36	(11)
1920–1924	Arsenal	69	(0)
1926	Arsenal	1	(1)
Total		226	(39)

International career
1921	Football League XI	1	(0)
- * Club domestic league appearances and goals

James Alexander Paterson MC (9 May 1891 – 31 August 1959) was a Scottish doctor and footballer who played as an outside left.

== Life and career ==
Born in London but brought up in Glasgow, Paterson was on the books of both Rangers and Queen's Park as an amateur, whilst training as a doctor. He won the Scottish Football League championship with Rangers in 1912–13 and a Glasgow Cup the following season and played regularly until graduating in 1916. With World War I in full effect, he joined the London Scottish Regiment and served as a medical officer, winning the Military Cross for his bravery in action in France in 1917. After the war ended, Paterson was posted to a Scottish hospital and played one further season with Rangers in 1919–20 (making a surprise but successful return despite being overweight and untrained), winning the championship for a second time.

He moved to London to share a medical practice in Clapton with his brother-in-law, John L. Scott, who was also the Arsenal team doctor. Paterson was persuaded to sign for Arsenal as an amateur and made his debut on the left wing against Derby County on 30 October 1920. Paterson became a regular fixture in the Arsenal side that season, and even played for the English Football League XI against the Scottish Football League XI (he had been ineligible to represent Scotland due to his birthplace under the rules of the time). He was out the side in 1921–22, before returning to play over 20 games in both the 1922–23 and 1923–24 seasons. While he was not paid as a professional, some valuable gifts were bestowed on him during his career including a silver tea service from Rangers and a piano from Arsenal.

An anecdote by the Times columnist Brian Glanville recounted how once, when given a bunch of daffodils by a girl in the crowd for one match, Paterson played on the wing with them in his hand for several minutes before finding a place to put them.

He retired from football in the summer of 1924 to concentrate on his medical practice, only to make a surprise return to the Arsenal side two years later after being persuaded by Herbert Chapman. Against Newcastle United on 13 February 1926, he scored his only ever league goal, in a 3–0 win, and he then played in three FA Cup ties against Aston Villa (twice, scoring in the replay) and Swansea Town. In all he made 77 appearances for Arsenal, scoring two goals.

Paterson continued to work in medical practice until his retirement in the 1950s. He died of a heart attack in 1959, aged 68.
