= Willie Reid (footballer, born 1884) =

Scottish footballer and manager

Personal information
- Full name: William Reid
- Date of birth: 3 May 1884
- Place of birth: Baillieston, Scotland
- Date of death: 13 May 1964 (aged 80)
- Place of death: Baillieston, Scotland
- Position: Striker

Senior career*
| Years | Team | Apps | (Gls) |
| 1903–1906 | Morton | 26 | (11) |
| 1906 | → Third Lanark (loan) | 0 | (0) |
| 1906–1909 | Motherwell | 59 | (35) |
| 1908–1909 | → Portsmouth (loan) | | |
| 1909–1920 | Rangers | 217 | (188) |
| 1920–1922 | Albion Rovers | 65 | (36) |

International career
| 1910–1915 | Scottish Football League XI | 8 | (10) |
| 1911–1914 | Scotland | 9 | (4) |
| 1916 | Scotland (wartime) | 1 | (0) |
| 1916 | Scottish League (wartime) | 1 | (0) |

Managerial career
- 1922–1929: Albion Rovers
- 1931–1934: Dundee United
- * Club domestic league appearances and goals

William Reid (3 May 1884 – 13 May 1964) was a Scottish international football player and manager, who played as a striker.

== Playing career ==
=== Club ===
Born in Baillieston, Lanarkshire, Reid began his senior career in 1903 with Morton, whom he joined from Baillieston Thistle. He scored 11 league goals in two seasons before a move to Third Lanark in April 1906; his only official appearance for the club was in the Scottish Cup final defeat to Hearts later that month. A transfer to Motherwell followed, where he scored 35 times in two seasons before a loan spell in England with Portsmouth.

Reid returned to Scotland in April 1909 when signed by Rangers, where again his debut came in a Scottish Cup final (in this case the replay of the 1909 event which was followed by a riot by spectators with the trophy withheld) but this time he stayed with his new club for a long period, and won three successive league titles. He was the club's top scorer for six consecutive seasons between 1910 and 1916. His football career was interrupted by the First World War, during which he served as a gunner in the Royal Field Artillery 52nd Lowland Division and played only once for Rangers in three years, returning to contribute to another championship in the 1919–20 campaign.

In 1920 Reid moved to Albion Rovers as player-manager, where he finished his playing career with 36 league goals for the club.

Reid remains the fourth top goalscorer of all time in the Scottish top flight with 270 goals. Of these, 188 were scored during his time at Rangers.

=== International ===
Reid received all his caps for Scotland national side while with Rangers. He made his Scotland debut in a 2–2 draw with Wales in 1911 and earned his last cap three years later, against England. He also represented the Scottish Football League XI, scoring ten times in eight appearances, and made one further unofficial wartime appearance for both bodies.

== Managerial career ==
Reid held the role of secretary/manager with Albion Rovers before becoming Dundee United manager in 1931. Reid was unable to keep United up following their promotion and left in 1934 with the club in financial trouble. It was his final post in senior football.

== Honours ==
Third Lanark

- Scottish Cup: Runner-up 1905–06

Rangers

- Scottish Football League: 1910–11, 1911–12, 1912–13, 1919–20
- Scottish Cup: Finalist 1908–09
- Glasgow Cup: 1910–11, 1911–12, 1912–13, 1913–14
- Glasgow Merchants Charity Cup: 1910–11

Individual

- Scottish Division One Top goalscorer: 1910–11, 1911–12

== See also ==
- List of footballers in Scotland by number of league goals (200+)
