= 1902–03 Dundee F.C. season =

Dundee
1902–03 season
- Manager: William Wallace
- Stadium: Dens Park
- Division One: 2nd
- Scottish Cup: Semi-finals
- Top goalscorer: League: Alan Bell & Bill White (6); All: Bill White (9)
Home colours

The 1902–03 season was the 10th season in which Dundee competed at a Scottish national level, playing in Division One. In what would be their best season to date, Dundee finished in the league in 2nd place, finishing 6 points behind champions Hibernian. Dundee would also compete in the Scottish Cup, where they would progress to the semi-finals before losing in a replay to Hearts. This would be the first season where Dundee would wear dark blue uniforms as their definitive home colours, with their kit for the season being described as "dark blue semmets and pants, the latter being relieved with a nice red stripe down the side".

== Scottish Division One ==
Statistics provided by Dee Archive

Match day	Date	Opponent	H/A	Score	Dundee scorer(s)	Attendance
1	16 August	Queen's Park	H	2–0	White, Bell	8,000
2	23 August	Heart of Midlothian	A	2–0	MacFarlane, Turnbull	10,000
3	30 August	Kilmarnock	H	2–0	Turnbull, Bell	10,000
4	6 September	Partick Thistle	A	2–0	MacFarlane, Bell	7,000
5	13 September	Port Glasgow Athletic	H	2–1	MacFarlane, Bell	8,000
6	20 September	St Mirren	H	2–1	McDiarmid, Bell	13,000
7	27 September	Hibernian	A	0–1		18,000
8	4 October	Third Lanark	H	0–0		14,000
9	11 October	St Mirren	A	0–1		11,500
10	18 October	Heart of Midlothian	H	0–1		12,800
11	25 October	Hibernian	H	0–3		15,000
12	1 November	Port Glasgow Athletic	A	0–0		
13	15 November	Greenock Morton	H	3–0	Bell, Gilligan, White	12,000
14	22 November	Greenock Morton	A	2–0	McDiarmid, T. Robertson	400
15	29 November	Celtic	A	2–2	MacFarlane, White	1,000
16	6 December	Rangers	H	3–1	McDiarmid, White (2)	12,000
17	13 December	Kilmarnock	A	2–0	Gilligan, White	3,000
18	20 December	Queen's Park	A	0–0		10,000
19	27 December	Partick Thistle	H	3–0	Dickson (3)	6,000
20	17 January	Rangers	A	1–1	Dickson	10,000
21	21 March	Celtic	H	2–0	Sharp, MacFarlane	9,000
22	4 April	Third Lanark	A	1–0	Gilligan	

=== League table ===
Pos	Team	Pld	W	D	L	GF	GA	GD	Pts	Qualification or relegation
1	Hibernian (C)	22	16	5	1	48	18	+30	37	Champions
2	Dundee	22	13	5	4	31	12	+19	31	
3	Rangers	22	12	5	5	56	24	+32	29	
4	Heart of Midlothian	22	11	6	5	46	27	+19	28	
5	Celtic	22	8	10	4	36	30	+6	26	

Source: nozdrul.plus.com
(C) Champions

== Scottish Cup ==
Statistics provided by Dee Archive

Match day	Date	Opponent	H/A	Score	Dundee scorer(s)	Attendance
1st round	24 January	Barholm Rovers	H	w/o		
2nd round	31 January	Nithsdale Wanderers	H	7–0	White (3), Dickson (3), T. Robertson	7,000
Quarter-finals	7 February	Hibernian	A	0–0		15,000
QF replay	14 February	Hibernian	H	0–0		24,000
QF 2nd replay	21 February	Hibernian	N	1–0	Bell	36,000
Semi-finals	28 February	Heart of Midlothian	H	0–0		22,000
SF replay	7 March	Heart of Midlothian	A	0–1		32,000

== Player statistics ==
Statistics provided by Dee Archive

No.	Pos	Nat	Player	Total		First Division		Scottish Cup	
No.	Pos	Nat	Player	Apps	Goals	Apps	Goals	Apps	Goals
	FW	(Scotland) SCO	Alan Bell	27	7	21	6	6	1
	DF	(Scotland) SCO	Vice Bonthrone	1	0	1	0	0	0
	DF	(Scotland) SCO	Dickie Boyle	21	0	16	0	5	0
	DF	(Scotland) SCO	Johnny Darroch	28	0	22	0	6	0
	FW	(Scotland) SCO	Jimmy Dickson	8	7	3	4	5	3
	FW	(Scotland) SCO	Sam Gilligan	9	3	8	3	1	0
	MF	(Scotland) SCO	Dave Gowans	4	0	4	0	0	0
	MF	(Scotland) SCO	Alick Halkett	4	0	2	0	2	0
	MF	(Scotland) SCO	George Henderson	12	0	12	0	0	0
	MF	(Scotland) SCO	Jimmy Jeffray	1	0	0	0	1	0
	FW	(Scotland) SCO	Joe Kerr	1	0	1	0	0	0
	FW	(Scotland) SCO	Sandy MacFarlane	28	5	22	5	6	0
	FW	(Scotland) SCO	Fred McDiarmid	26	3	22	3	4	0
	GK	(Scotland) SCO	Willie Muir	28	0	22	0	6	0
	MF	(Scotland) SCO	Peter Robertson	25	0	19	0	6	0
	FW	(Scotland) SCO	Tommy Robertson	19	2	13	1	6	1
	DF	(Scotland) SCO	Jimmy Sharp	28	1	22	1	6	0
	FW	(Scotland) SCO	Jimmy Turnbull	12	2	12	2	0	0
	FW	(Scotland) SCO	Bill White	26	9	20	6	6	3

== See also ==
- List of Dundee F.C. seasons
