= 1907–08 Celtic F.C. season =

Celtic
1907–08 season
- Chairman: James Kelly
- Manager: Willie Maley
- Stadium: Celtic Park
- Scottish First Division: 1st
- Scottish Cup: Winners
- Highest home attendance: 27,000
- Lowest home attendance: 3,000
- Average home league attendance: 10,500

During the 1907–08 Scottish football season, their 20th season of competitive football, Celtic competed in the Scottish First Division.

Under long-time manager Willie Maley, Celtic won the league for the fourth time in a row, a record at the time, en route what would be a total of six-in-a-row. The title was clinched with a 1-0 win against Rangers at Ibrox Stadium on 25 April, marking the first time that Celtic had secured a league title by earning a result at the ground of their fierce rivals and still the only time that they have done so with a win there.

They also won the Scottish Cup, achieving a League and Cup double for the second consecutive season. No Scottish team would achieve two consecutive League and Cup doubles until Rangers matched that feat for the first time in 1935. This 'Double Double' record would stand unsurpassed until 2019, when Celtic achieved their 'Treble Treble', en route to their 2019-20 'Quadruple Treble' of four consecutive domestic trebles of League, Cup and League Cup.

With the two major honours the club won this season, their total haul raised to 14 (8 league titles and 6 Scottish Cups).

== Competitions ==
=== Scottish First Division ===
==== League table ====
Pos	Team	Pld	W	D	L	GF	GA	GD	Pts
1	Celtic (C)	34	24	7	3	86	27	+59	55
2	Falkirk	34	22	7	5	103	42	+61	51
3	Rangers	34	21	8	5	74	40	+34	50
4	Dundee	34	20	8	6	71	28	+43	48
5	Hibernian	34	17	8	9	55	42	+13	42

(C) Champions

==== Matches ====
15 August 1907 First Division	Celtic	3–0	Hamilton Academical	Glasgow
				Stadium: Celtic Park; Attendance: 6,500

17 August 1907 First Division	Celtic	3–0	Motherwell	Glasgow
				Stadium: Celtic Park; Attendance: 12,000

24 August 1907 First Division	Morton	2–3	Celtic	Greenock
				Stadium: Cappielow Park; Attendance: 9,000

31 August 1907 First Division	Celtic	3–2	Dundee	Glasgow
				Stadium: Celtic Park; Attendance: 27,000

7 September 1907 First Division	Celtic	3–2	Falkirk	Glasgow
				Stadium: Celtic Park; Attendance: 16,000

14 September 1907 First Division	Kilmarnock	0–0	Celtic	Kilmarnock
				Stadium: Rugby Park; Attendance: 15,000

21 September 1907 First Division	Celtic	1–1	Airdrieonians	Glasgow
				Stadium: Celtic Park; Attendance: 20,000

23 September 1907 First Division	Aberdeen	2–1	Celtic	Aberdeen
				Stadium: Pittodrie Park; Attendance: 8,500

30 September 1907 First Division	Third Lanark	1–3	Celtic	Glasgow
				Stadium: Cathkin Park; Attendance: 12,000

5 October 1907 First Division	Hibernian	1–2	Celtic	Edinburgh
				Stadium: Easter Road; Attendance: 12,000

2 November 1907 First Division	Celtic	5–0	Port Glasgow Athletic	Glasgow
				Stadium: Celtic Park; Attendance: 7,000

9 November 1907 First Division	Clyde	0–2	Celtic	Glasgow
				Stadium: Shawfield Stadium; Attendance: 20,000

16 November 1907 First Division	Celtic	4–1	Queen's Park	Glasgow
				Stadium: Celtic Park; Attendance: 13,000

23 November 1907 First Division	Hearts	1–0	Celtic	Edinburgh
				Stadium: Tynecastle Park; Attendance: 22,500

7 December 1907 First Division	Celtic	4–0	St Mirren	Glasgow
				Stadium: Celtic Park; Attendance: 8,000

21 December 1907 First Division	Celtic	4–1	Kilmarnock	Glasgow
				Stadium: Celtic Park; Attendance: 9,000

28 December 1907 First Division	Airdrieonains	0–0	Celtic	Airdrie
				Stadium: Broomfield Park; Attendance: 4,000

1 January 1908 First Division	Celtic	2–1	Rangers	Glasgow
				Stadium: Celtic Park; Attendance: 60,000

2 January 1908 First Division	Celtic	3–0	Aberdeen	Glasgow
				Stadium: Celtic Park; Attendance: 6,000

11 January 1908 First Division	Celtic	5–1	Clyde	Glasgow
				Stadium: Celtic Park; Attendance: 8,000

18 January 1908 First Division	Motherwell	2–2	Celtic	Motherwell
				Stadium: Fir Park; Attendance: 10,000

1 February 1908 First Division	Celtic	4–1	Partick Thistle	Glasgow
				Stadium: Celtic Park; Attendance: 4,000

14 February 1908 First Division	Hamilton Academical	2–4	Celtic	Hamilton
				Stadium: Douglas Park; Attendance: 6,000

15 February 1908 First Division	Port Glasgow Athletic	0–3	Celtic	Port Glasgow
				Stadium: Clune Park; Attendance: 3,000

29 February 1908 First Division	Celtic	1–1	Third Lanark	Glasgow
				Stadium: Celtic Park; Attendance: 11,000

7 March 1908 First Division	Celtic	4–0	Hibernian	Glasgow
				Stadium: Celtic Park; Attendance: 16,000

14 March 1908 First Division	Partick Thistle	0–3	Celtic	Glasgow
				Stadium: Meadowside; Attendance: 8,000

28 March 1908 First Division	Dundee	2–0	Celtic	Dundee
				Stadium: Dens Park; Attendance: 16,000

4 April 1908 First Division	Celtic	2–0	Morton	Glasgow
				Stadium: Celtic Park; Attendance: 3,000

11 April 1908 First Division	Queen's Park	0–2	Celtic	Glasgow
				Stadium: Hampden Park; Attendance: 11,000

20 April 1908 First Division	Celtic	6–0	Hearts	Glasgow
				Stadium: Celtic Park; Attendance: 5,000

25 April 1908 First Division	Rangers	0–1	Celtic	Glasgow
				Stadium: Ibrox Park; Attendance: 40,000

27 April 1908 First Division	Falkirk	1–1	Celtic	Falkirk
				Stadium: Brockville Park; Attendance: 10,000

30 April 1908 First Division	St Mirren	2–2	Celtic	Paisley
				Stadium: St Mirren Park, Love Street; Attendance: 6,000

=== Scottish Cup ===
25 January 1908 First round	Celtic	4–0	Peebles Rovers	Glasgow
				Stadium: Celtic Park; Attendance: 4,000

8 February 1908 Second round	Rangers	1–2	Celtic	Glasgow
				Stadium: Ibrox Park; Attendance: 23,000

22 February 1908 Third round	Raith Rovers	0–3	Celtic	Kirkcaldy
				Stadium: Stark's Park; Attendance: 14,000

21 March 1908 Semi-final	Aberdeen	0–1	Celtic	Aberdeen
				Stadium: Pittodrie Park; Attendance: 20,000

18 April 1908 Final	Celtic	5–1	St Mirren	Glasgow
				Stadium: Hampden Park; Attendance: 58,000

=== Appearances and goals ===
No.	Pos	Nat	Player	Total		Division One		Scottish Cup		Glasgow Cup	
No.	Pos	Nat	Player	Apps	Goals	Apps	Goals	Apps	Goals	Apps	Goals
Goalkeepers
1	GK	(Scotland) SCO	Davey Adams	44	0	37	0	2	0	5	0
Defenders
2	DF	(Scotland) SCO	Donald McLeod	20	1	14	1	1	0	5	0
3	DF	(Scotland) SCO	Alec McNair	37	3	31	3	2	0	4	0
4	DF	(Scotland) SCO	Jimmy Weir	36	3	28	3	3	0	5	0
Midfielders
13	MF	(Scotland) SCO	Alec Bennett	37	7	29	4	4	0	4	3
14	MF	(Scotland) SCO	Jimmy Hay	33	5	28	4	2	0	3	1
16	MF	(Scotland) SCO	Willie Loney	4	0	2	0	2	0	0	0
24	MF	(Scotland) SCO	Jimmy McMenemy	18	0	13	0	1	0	4	0
33	MF	(Scotland) SCO	James Young	46	4	38	3	3	0	5	1
Forwards
8	FW	(Scotland) SCO	Willie Kivlichan	44	34	36	27	3	3	5	4
9	FW	(Scotland) SCO	David McLean	34	5	26	5	3	0	5	0
11	FW	(Scotland) SCO	Jimmy Quinn	42	13	34	10	4	2	4	1
17	FW	(Scotland) SCO	Peter Somers	39	13	33	11	2	0	4	2
19	FW	(Scotland) SCO	Davie Hamilton	21	7	16	6	1	0	4	1
38	FW	(Scotland) SCO	William Semple	43	11	35	8	4	2	4	1

Last updated: 3 June 2023
Source: Competitions

== Club Staff ==
Board of Directors
Position	Name
Chairman	James Kelly
Secretary	Willie Maley
Directors	Tom Colgan Michael Dunbar James Grant John McKillop Tom White

Football Staff
Position	Name
Manager	Willie Maley
Trainer	R Davies

== Transfers ==
=== In ===
Pos	Player	From	Type	Date	Fee
DF	(Scotland) Alexander Morrison	(Scotland) Ayr FC	Transfer	May 1907	Free
DF	(Scotland) Jimmy Weir	(Scotland) Ayr FC	Transfer	May 1907	Free
FW	(Scotland) Willie Kivlichan	(Scotland) Glasgow Rangers FC	Transfer	May 1907	Free
FW	(Scotland) William Semple	(Scotland) Ballieston Thistle	Transfer	October 1907	Free
MF	(Scotland) Peter Johnstone	(Scotland) Glencraig Celtic	Transfer	January 1908	Free

=== Out ===
Pos	Player	To	Type	Date	Fee
FW	(Scotland) Ted Garry	(England) Derby County FC	Transfer	May 1907	Free
DF	(Scotland) Alex Wilson	(Scotland) Kilmarnock FC	Transfer	July 1907	Free
FW	(Scotland) Jimmy Bauchop	(England) Norwich City FC	Loan	July 1907	Loan
FW	(Scotland) Bobby Templeton	(Scotland) Kilmarnock FC	Transfer	October 1907	Free
DF	(Scotland) Alexander Morrison	(Scotland) Clyde FC	Transfer	October 1907	Free
FW	(Scotland) Jimmy Bauchop	(England) Crystal Palace FC	Transfer	January 1908	Free
