= 1905–06 Heart of Midlothian F.C. season =

Heart of Midlothian
1905–06 season
- Manager: William Waugh
- Stadium: Tynecastle Park
- Scottish First Division: 2nd
- Scottish Cup: Winners

During the 1905–06 season Hearts competed in the Scottish First Division, the Scottish Cup and the East of Scotland Shield.

== Fixtures ==
=== East of Scotland Shield ===
7 October 1905 East of Scotland Shield SF	Hearts	2–0	St Bernard's	Tynecastle Park

14 April 1906 East of Scotland Shield Final	Hearts	1–2	Hibernian	Tynecastle Park
	(Hearts protest at Hibs fielding an illegible player, match rearranged)

23 April 1906 East of Scotland Shield Final	Hearts	0–0	Hibernian	Tynecastle Park

15 May 1906 East of Scotland Shield Final Replay	Hibernian	1–2	Hearts	Easter Road

=== Rosebery Charity Cup ===
26 May 1906 Rosebery Charity Cup SF	Hearts	3–1	St Bernard's	Tynecastle Park

30 May 1906 Rosebery Charity Cup Final	Hearts	0–2	Hibernian	Tynecastle Park

=== East of Scotland Cup ===
30 April 1906 East of Scotland Cup SF	Hearts	7–1	Bo'ness	Tynecastle Park

12 May 1906 East of Scotland Cup Final	Hearts	4–1	Leith Athletic	Tynecastle Park

=== Wilson Cup ===
1 January 1906 Wilson Cup	Hearts	0–1	Hibernian	Tynecastle Park

=== Scottish Cup ===
27 January 1906 Scottish Cup R1	Hearts	4–1	Nithsdale Wanderers	Tynecastle Park
				Attendance: 4,000

10 February 1906 Scottish Cup R2	Beith	0–3	Hearts	Rugby Park
				Attendance: 3,000

24 February 1906 Scottish Cup R3	Celtic	1–2	Hearts	Celtic Park
				Attendance: 52,000

31 March 1906 Scottish Cup SF	Port Glasgow Athletic	0–2	Hearts	Tynecastle Park
				Attendance: 8,500

28 April 1906 Final	Hearts	1–0	Third Lanark	Hampden Park
				Attendance: 30,000

=== East of Scotland League ===
15 August 1905 East of Scotland League	Hibernian	0–1	Hearts	Easter Road

17 March 1906 East of Scotland League	Hearts	3–1	Dundee	Tynecastle Park

24 March 1906 East of Scotland League	Aberdeen	3–1	Hearts	Pittodrie Park

5 May 1906 East of Scotland League	St Bernard's	5–0	Hearts	Dens Park

8 May 1906 East of Scotland League	Falkirk	5–0	Hearts	Brockville Park

14 May 1906 East of Scotland League	Hearts	3–2	Leith Athletic	Tynecastle Park

=== Scottish First Division ===
19 August 1905 Scottish First Division	Hearts	3–2	Third Lanark	Tynecastle Park
				Attendance: 11,500

26 August 1905 Scottish First Division	St Mirren	0–1	Hearts	St Mirren Park, Love STreet
				Attendance: 7,500

2 September 1905 Scottish First Division	Hearts	4–0	Motherwell	Tynecastle Park
				Attendance: 7,500

9 September 1905 Scottish First Division	Port Glasgow Athletic	2–5	Hearts	Clune Park
				Attendance: 4,000

11 September 1905 Scottish First Division	Hearts	1–1	Celtic	Tynecastle Park
				Attendance: 13,000

16 September 1905 Scottish First Division	Hearts	3–0	Kilmarnock	Tynecastle Park
				Attendance: 7,000

18 September 1905 Scottish First Division	Hibernian	0–3	Hearts	Easter Road
				Attendance: 15,000

25 September 1905 Scottish First Division	Rangers	0–5	Hearts	Ibrox Park
				Attendance: 18,000

30 September 1905 Scottish First Division	Queen's Park	0–3	Hearts	Hampden Park
				Attendance: 4,000

14 October 1905 Scottish First Division	Hearts	2–0	Partick Thistle	Tynecastle Park
				Attendance: 6,500

21 October 1905 Scottish First Division	Dundee	1–1	Hearts	Dens Park
				Attendance: 14,000

28 October 1905 Scottish First Division	Hearts	1–1	Aberdeen	Tynecastle Park
				Attendance: 8,000

4 November 1905 Scottish First Division	Hearts	1–0	Hibernian	Tynecastle Park
				Attendance: 10,500

11 November 1905 Scottish First Division	Hearts	2–1	Airdrieonians	Tynecastle Park
				Attendance: 10,000

18 November 1905 Scottish First Division	Kilmarnock	1–1	Hearts	Rugby Park
				Attendance: 5,000

25 November 1905 Scottish First Division	Hearts	1–0	Falkirk	Tynecastle Park
				Attendance: 6,000

2 December 1905 Scottish First Division	Aberdeen	2–1	Hearts	Pittodrie Park
				Attendance: 8,000

9 December 1905 Scottish First Division	Hearts	4–0	Port Glasgow Athletic	Tynecastle Park
				Attendance: 6,000

16 December 1905 Scottish First Division	Morton	2–1	Hearts	Cappielow Park
				Attendance: 4,000

23 December 1905 Scottish First Division	Hearts	1–0	St Mirren	Tynecastle Park
				Attendance: 5,500

30 December 1905 Scottish First Division	Motherwell	2–1	Hearts	Fir Park
				Attendance: 5,000

2 January 1906 Scottish First Division	Third Lanark	1–3	Hearts	Cathkin Park
				Attendance: 7,000

6 January 1906 Scottish First Division	Airdrieonians	1–1	Hearts	Broomfield Park
				Attendance: 6,000

13 January 1906 Scottish First Division	Hearts	4–0	Dundee	Tynecastle Park
				Attendance: 8,000

20 January 1906 Scottish First Division	Falkirk	2–2	Hearts	Brockville Park
				Attendance: 4,500

3 February 1906 Scottish First Division	Partick Thistle	4–1	Hearts	Meadowside
				Attendance: 3,000

17 February 1906 Scottish First Division	Hearts	0–1	Queen's Park	Tynecastle Park
				Attendance: 6,500

10 March 1906 Scottish First Division	Hearts	2–0	Morton	Tynecastle Park
				Attendance: 2,000

7 April 1906 Scottish First Division	Hearts	2–2	Rangers	Tynecastle Park
				Attendance: 6,500

21 April 1906 Scottish First Division	Celtic	1–0	Hearts	Tynecastle Park
				Attendance: 7,000

== See also ==
- List of Heart of Midlothian F.C. seasons
