= Donald McLeod (footballer) =

Scottish footballer

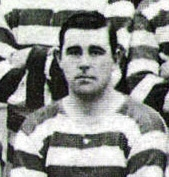

Personal information
- Full name: Donald McLeod
- Date of birth: 28 May 1882
- Place of birth: Laurieston, Scotland
- Date of death: 6 October 1917 (aged 35)
- Place of death: Dozinghem, Belgium
- Height: 5 ft 8 1/2 in (1.74 m)
- Position: Right back

Senior career*
| Years | Team | Apps | (Gls) |
| –1901 | Stenhousemuir Thistle | | |
| 1901–1902 | Stenhousemuir | | |
- Ayr
| 1902–1908 | Celtic | 131 | (0) |
| 1908–1913 | Middlesbrough | 138 | (0) |
- → Caledonian (loan)

International career
| 1905–1906 | Scotland | 4 | (0) |
| 1905–1906 | Scottish League XI | 2 | (0) |
- * Club domestic league appearances and goals

Donald McLeod (28 May 1882 – 6 October 1917) was a Scottish professional footballer who made over 260 appearances in the English and Scottish Leagues for Middlesbrough and Celtic respectively. A right back, he was capped by Scotland and represented the Scottish League XI. McLeod was nicknamed 'Slasher'.

== Personal life ==
Born in Laurieston, McLeod grew up in Grangemouth and Stenhousemuir and was married with three daughters. After his retirement from professional football in 1914, he took over the Lord Byron pub in Middlesbrough. In 1916, two years after the outbreak of the First World War, McLeod was conscripted into the Royal Garrison Artillery. He was subsequently transferred to the Royal Field Artillery and became a gunner. On 5 October 1917, during the Battle of Passchendaele, McLeod was wounded in action, losing his right leg below the knee and part of his left foot. He died of wounds the following day at the 47th Casualty Clearing Station in Dozinghem, near Poperinge. McLeod was buried in Dozinghem Military Cemetery.

== Career statistics ==
Appearances and goals by club, season and competition
| Club | Season | League | | | National Cup | | Other | | Total | |
| Club | Season | Division | Apps | Goals | Apps | Goals | Apps | Goals | Apps | Goals |
|---|---|---|---|---|---|---|---|---|---|---|
| Celtic | 1902–03 | Scottish First Division | 20 | 0 | 1 | 0 | 3 (Note: Appearances in Glasgow Cup) | 0 | 24 | 0 |
| Celtic | 1903–04 | Scottish First Division | 10 | 0 | 6 | 0 | 1 | 0 | 17 | 0 |
| Celtic | 1904–05 | Scottish First Division | 25 | 0 | 4 | 0 | 3 | 0 | 32 | 0 |
| Celtic | 1905–06 | Scottish First Division | 21 | 0 | 3 | 0 | 2 | 0 | 26 | 0 |
| Celtic | 1906–07 | Scottish First Division | 25 | 0 | 9 | 0 | 3 | 0 | 37 | 0 |
| Celtic | 1907–08 | Scottish First Division | 26 | 0 | 1 | 0 | 0 | 0 | 27 | 0 |
| Celtic | 1908–09 | Scottish First Division | 4 | 0 | — | | 1 | 0 | 5 | 0 |
| Celtic | Total | | 131 | 0 | 24 | 0 | 13 | 0 | 168 | 0 |
| Middlesbrough | 1908–09 | First Division | 32 | 0 | 1 | 0 | — | | 33 | 0 |
| Middlesbrough | 1909–10 | First Division | 35 | 0 | 2 | 0 | — | | 37 | 0 |
| Middlesbrough | 1910–11 | First Division | 34 | 0 | 3 | 0 | — | | 37 | 0 |
| Middlesbrough | 1911–12 | First Division | 24 | 0 | 4 | 0 | — | | 28 | 0 |
| Middlesbrough | 1912–13 | First Division | 13 | 0 | 0 | 0 | — | | 13 | 0 |
| Middlesbrough | Total | | 138 | 0 | 10 | 0 | — | | 148 | 0 |
| Career total | | | 269 | 0 | 34 | 0 | 13 | 0 | 316 | 0 |

== Honours ==
Celtic

- Scottish League First Division (4): 1904–05, 1905–06, 1906–07, 1907–08
- Scottish Cup (2): 1906–07, 1907–08
- Glasgow Cup (2): 1904–05, 1906–07
