= 1905–06 Celtic F.C. season =

Celtic
1905–06 season
- Manager: Willie Maley
- Stadium: Celtic Park
- Scottish First Division: 1st
- Scottish Cup: 3rd Round

1905-06 was Celtic's 18th season of competitive football. They competed as trophy holders in the Scottish First Division, which they successfully retained. It was the second time Celtic won two league titles in a row, their 6th league title overall, and their 10th major domestic title. This was their second league title in route to a then record six league titles in a row.

Celtic reached the third round of the Scottish Cup, but lost 1-2 home to Hearts.They also won the Glasgow Cup this season.

== Competitions ==
=== Scottish First Division ===
==== League table ====
Pos	Team	Pld	W	D	L	GF	GA	GD	Pts	Qualification or relegation
1	Celtic (C)	30	24	1	5	76	19	+57	49	Champions
2	Heart of Midlothian	30	18	7	5	64	27	+37	43	
3	Airdrieonians	30	15	8	7	53	31	+22	38	
4	Rangers	30	15	7	8	58	48	+10	37	
5	Partick Thistle	30	15	6	9	44	40	+4	36	

Source: "1905-1906 Division 1 - SPFL Archive". SPFL.
(C) Champions

==== Matches ====
19 August 1905 First Division	Celtic	3–1	Motherwell	Glasgow
				Stadium: Celtic Park; Attendance: 9,000

26 August 1905 First Division	Kilmarnock	2–4	Celtic	Kilmarnock
				Stadium: Rugby Park; Attendance: 8,500

2 September 1905 First Division	Celtic	1–0	Hibernian	Glasgow
				Stadium: Celtic Park; Attendance: 13,000

11 September 1905 First Division	Hearts	1–1	Celtic	Edinburgh
				Stadium: Tynecastle Park; Attendance: 13,000

16 September 1905 First Division	Falkirk	0–5	Celtic	Falkirk
				Stadium: Brockville Park; Attendance: 6,000

25 September 1905 First Division	Third Lanark	0–1	Celtic	Glasgow
				Stadium: Cathkin Park; Attendance: 16,000

30 September 1905 First Division	Celtic	2–1	Airdrieonians	Glasgow
				Stadium: Celtic Park; Attendance: 10,000

14 October 1905 First Division	Celtic	5–1	Queen's Park	Glasgow
				Stadium: Celtic Park; Attendance: 12,000

21 October 1905 First Division	Rangers	3–2	Celtic	Glasgow
				Stadium: Ibrox Park; Attendance: 35,000

28 October 1905 First Division	Celtic	3–1	Dundee	Glasgow
				Stadium: Celtic Park; Attendance: 10,000

4 November 1905 First Division	Partick Thistle	0–3	Celtic	Glasgow
				Stadium: Meadowside; Attendance: 9,000

11 November 1905 First Division	Celtic	0–1	Port Glasgow Athletic	Glasgow
				Stadium: Celtic Park; Attendance: 4,500

18 November 1905 First Division	Morton	0–4	Celtic	Greenock
				Stadium: Cappielow Park; Attendance: 6,500

25 November 1905 First Division	Celtic	2–1	St Mirren	Glasgow
				Stadium: Celtic Park; Attendance: 5,000

2 December 1905 First Division	Port Glasgow Athletic	0–1	Celtic	Port Glasgow
				Stadium: Clune Park; Attendance: 8,000

9 December 1905 First Division	Celtic	1–0	Aberdeen	Glasgow
				Stadium: Celtic Park; Attendance: 12,000

16 December 1905 First Division	Motherwell	0–4	Celtic	Motherwell
				Stadium: Fir Park; Attendance: 8,000

23 December 1905 First Division	Celtic	4–0	Morton	Glasgow
				Stadium: Celtic Park; Attendance: 6,000

30 December 1905 First Division	Hibernian	0–1	Celtic	Edinburgh
				Stadium: Easter Road; Attendance: 11,000

1 January 1906 First Division	Celtic	1–0	Rangers	Glasgow
				Stadium: Celtic Park; Attendance: 36,000

2 January 1906 First Division	Celtic	2–0	Kilmarnock	Glasgow
				Stadium: Celtic Park; Attendance: 6,500

6 January 1906 First Division	Celtic	7–0	Falkirk	Glasgow
				Stadium: Celtic Park; Attendance: 5,500

13 January 1906 First Division	Airdrieonians	0–2	Celtic	Airdrie
				Stadium: Broomfield Park; Attendance: 13,000

20 January 1906 First Division	Celtic	4–1	Partick Thistle	Glasgow
				Stadium: Celtic Park; Attendance: 12,000

3 February 1906 First Division	Dundee	1–0	Celtic	Dundee
				Stadium: Dens Park; Attendance: 10,800

17 February 1906 First Division	St Mirren	1–3	Celtic	Paisley
				Stadium: St Mirren Park, Love Street; Attendance: 12,000

3 March 1906 First Division	Aberdeen	1–0	Celtic	Aberdeen
				Stadium: Pittodrie Park; Attendance: 10,500

10 March 1906 First Division	Queen's Park	0–6	Celtic	Glasgow
				Stadium: Hampden Park; Attendance: 15,000

21 April 1906 First Division	Celtic	1–0	Hearts	Glasgow
				Stadium: Celtic Park; Attendance: 7,000

7 May 1906 First Division	Celtic	0–1	Third Lanark	Glasgow
				Stadium: Celtic Park; Attendance: 1,500

=== Scottish Cup ===
27 January 1906 First round	Dundee	1–2	Celtic	Dundee
				Stadium: Dens Park; Attendance: 26,000

10 February 1906 Second round	Celtic	3–0	Bo'ness	Glasgow
				Stadium: Celtic Park; Attendance: 5,000

24 February 1906 Third round	Celtic	1–2	Hearts	Glasgow
				Stadium: Celtic Park; Attendance: 52,000
