= 1905–06 Rangers F.C. season =

Rangers
1905–06 season
- Chairman: James Henderson
- Manager: William Wilton
- Ground: Ibrox Park
- Scottish League Division One: 4th P30 W15 D7 L8 F58 A48 Pts37
- Scottish Cup: Quarter-finals
- Top goalscorer: League: Robert Hamilton (9); All: Robert Hamilton (10)

The 1905–06 season was the 32nd season of competitive football by Rangers.

== Overview ==
Rangers played a total of 33 competitive matches during the 1905–06 season. The side finished fourth in the league, twelve points behind champions Celtic, despite only collecting one win from the final six matches.

The Scottish Cup campaign began at Arthurlie then Aberdeen before the side were knocked out away to Port Glasgow Athletic.

== Results ==
All results are written with Rangers' score first.

=== Scottish League Division One ===
Date	Opponent	Venue	Result	Attendance	Scorers
19 August 1905	Kilmarnock	H	3–2	10,000	Hamilton (2), McColl (pen)
26 August 1905	Aberdeen	H	1–0	8,000	McMillan
2 September 1905	Airdrieonians	A	1–5	12,000	Hamilton
11 September 1905	Hibernian	A	2–1	6,000	Hamilton, Low
16 September 1905	St. Mirren	H	1–0	15,000	Stark
25 September 1905	Heart of Midlothian	H	0–5	18,000	
7 October 1905	Port Glasgow	A	4–1	3,000	Kyle, Stark, Hamilton, Shaw
14 October 1905	Dundee	H	1–1	9,500	Shaw
21 October 1905	Celtic	H	3–2	30,000	Kyle, Shaw, May
28 October 1905	Falkirk	A	6–1	6,000	Ruddiman (3), May, Kyle (pen), Shaw
4 November 1905	Queen's Park	A	2–1	13,000	Hawthorne (og), Spiers
11 November 1905	Third Lanark	H	2–4	10,000	Kyle (2)
18 November 1905	Motherwell	A	3–3	5,000	Kyle (3)
25 November 1905	Greenock Morton	H	1–2	4,000	Hamilton
2 December 1905	Queen's Park	H	3–1	7,000	Kivlichan, Smith (2)
9 December 1905	Greenock Morton	A	3–0	5,000	Speirs, May, Hamilton
16 December 1905	Aberdeen	A	1–1	10,000	Rankine
23 December 1905	Motherwell	H	2–1	6,000	McColl, Smith
30 December 1905	Airdrieonians	H	1–3	8,000	Speirs
1 January 1906	Celtic	A	0–1	40,000	
2 January 1906	Partick Thistle	H	1–0	10,000	McColl
6 January 1906	Kilmarnock	A	3–1	6,000	Hamilton, Dalrymple, McColl
13 January 1906	St. Mirren	A	2–3	7,000	Smith, McColl
20 January 1906	Port Glasgow	H	4–0	8,000	Dalrymple (3), McColl
3 February 1906	Third Lanark	A	0–3	13,000	
17 February 1906	Dundee	A	1–1	10,000	Kivlichan
3 March 1906	Hibernian	H	1–1	7,000	Hamilton
17 March 1906	Partick Thistle	A	1–1	8,000	Speirs
24 March 1906	Falkirk	H	3–1	7,000	Stark, Kivlichan, McFie
7 April 1906	Heart of Midlothian	A	2–2	6,000	Speirs (2)

=== Scottish Cup ===
Date	Round	Opponent	Venue	Result	Attendance	Scorers
27 January 1906	R1	Arthurlie	A	7–1	6,000	Speirs (3), Dalrymple (2), McColl, May
10 February 1906	R2	Aberdeen	A	3–2	14,000	Dalrymple (2), Hamilton
10 March 1906	QF	Port Glasgow	A	0–1	11,000	

== Appearances ==
Player	Position	Appearances	Goals
(Scotland) Tom Sinclair	GK	33	0
(Scotland) Alex Fraser	DF	2	0
(Scotland) Adam Gourlay	DF	6	0
(Scotland) Josiah Gray	DF	29	0
(Scotland) James Stark	DF	31	3
(Scotland) John May	DF	24	4
(Scotland) Robert Dalrymple	MF	15	8
(Scotland) Archie Kyle	FW	24	8
(Scotland) Robert Hamilton	FW	23	10
(Scotland) Robert Smyth McColl	FW	15	7
(Scotland) Alex Smith	FW	27	3
(Scotland) Jimmy Croal	DF	3	0
(Scotland) Andrew Cochrane	DF	10	0
(Scotland) David McMillan	DF	9	1
(Scotland) Danny Steel	MF	2	0
(Ireland) Alex Craig	DF	28	0
(Scotland) Tommy Low	MF	2	1
(Scotland) Jimmy Speirs	FW	21	9
(Scotland) Jock Walker	DF	14	0
(Scotland) John McFie	FW	4	1
(Scotland) Hugh C. Shaw	MF	6	3
(Scotland) Thomas Ruddiman	FW	4	3
(Scotland) Willie Kivlichan	MF	9	4
(Scotland) Johnny Rankine	MF	8	1
(Scotland) Robert Campbell	DF	9	0
(Scotland) Thomas Miller	MF	1	0
(Scotland) James Craig	MF	1	0
(Scotland) Finlay Speedie	FW	2	0
(Scotland) Constantine McGhee	DF	1	0

- Source: Fitbastats

== See also ==
- 1905–06 in Scottish football
- 1905–06 Scottish Cup
