= 1902–03 Celtic F.C. season =

Celtic
1902–03 season
- Manager: Willie Maley
- Stadium: Celtic Park
- Scottish First Division: 5th
- Scottish Cup: Third round

1902–03 was the 15th season of competitive football for Celtic, who competed in the Scottish First Division. For the third season in a row, Celtic failed to add major honours to their tally as they finished 5th in the league and were eliminated from the Scottish Cup in the 3rd round following a 0-3 home defeat to Rangers.

This was the last season at the club for captain Sandy McMahon, who would briefly play for fellow Glasgow club Partick Thistle before retiring.

Celtic won the Glasgow Charity Cup.

== Competitions ==
=== Scottish First Division ===
==== League table ====
Pos	Team	Pld	W	D	L	GF	GA	GD	Pts
3	Rangers	22	12	5	5	56	24	+32	29
4	Heart of Midlothian	22	11	6	5	46	27	+19	28
5	Celtic	22	8	10	4	36	30	+6	26
6	St Mirren	22	7	8	7	39	40	−1	22
7	Third Lanark	22	8	5	9	34	27	+7	21

Source: nozdrul.plus.com

==== Matches ====
16 August 1902 First Division	Hibernian	1–1	Celtic	Edinburgh
				Stadium: Easter Road; Attendance: 7,000

23 August 1902 First Division	Celtic	2–2	St Mirren	Glasgow
				Stadium: Celtic Park; Attendance: 8,000

30 August 1902 First Division	Third Lanark	1–2	Celtic	Glasgow
				Stadium: Cathkin Park; Attendance: 15,000

6 September 1902 First Division	Celtic	1– 1	Queen's Park	Glasgow
				Stadium: Celtic Park; Attendance: 14,000

15 September 1902 First Division	Hearts	1–2	Celtic	Edinburgh
				Stadium: Tynecastle Park; Attendance: 9,000

20 September 1902 First Division	Kilmarnock	1–3	Celtic	Kilmarnock
				Stadium: Rugby Park; Attendance: 7,000

27 September 1902 First Division	Celtic	1–0	Third Lanark	Glasgow
				Stadium: Celtic Park; Attendance: 15,000

29 September 1902 First Division	Celtic	2–2	Hearts	Glasgow
				Stadium: Celtic Park; Attendance: 14,000

4 October 1902 First Division	Queen's Park	2–1	Celtic	Glasgow
				Stadium: Hampden Park; Attendance: 12,000

18 October 1902 First Division	Celtic	1–1	Rangers	Glasgow
				Stadium: Celtic Park; Attendance: 25,000

1 November 1902 First Division	Celtic	3–1	Kilmarnock	Glasgow
				Stadium: Celtic Park; Attendance: 4,000

15 November 1902 First Division	Celtic	4–1	Partick Thistle	Glasgow
				Stadium: Celtic Park

22 November 1902 First Division	Celtic	3–0	Port Glasgow Athletic	Glasgow
				Stadium: Celtic Park

29 November 1902 First Division	Celtic	2–2	Dundee	Glasgow
				Stadium: Celtic Park

6 December 1902 First Division	Partick Thistle	0–0	Celtic	Glasgow
				Stadium: Meadowside; Attendance: 8,000

13 December 1902 First Division	St Mirren	3–1	Celtic	Paisley
				Stadium: St Mirren Park, Love Street; Attendance: 6,000

20 December 1902 First Division	Celtic	1–1	Morton	Glasgow
				Stadium: Celtic Park

1 January 1903 First Division	Rangers	3–3	Celtic	Glasgow
				Stadium: Ibrox Park; Attendance: 25,000

2 January 1903 First Division	Celtic	0–4	Hibernian	Glasgow
				Stadium: Celtic Park; Attendance: 14,000

7 March 1903 First Division	Port Glasgow Athletic	1–1	Celtic	Port Glasgow
				Stadium: Clune Park

14 March 1903 First Division	Morton	0–2	Celtic	Greenock
				Stadium: Cappielow Park; Attendance: 4,000

21 March 1903 First Division	Dundee	2–0	Celtic	Dundee
				Stadium: Dens Park; Attendance: 13,000

=== Inter City League ===
28 March 1903 Inter City League	Celtic	2–1	Queen's Park	Glasgow
				Stadium: Celtic Park

4 April 1903 Inter City League	St Mirren	0–0	Celtic	Paisley
				Stadium: St Mirren Park, Love Street

11 April 1903 Inter City League	Hibernian	2–1	Celtic	Edinburgh
				Stadium: Easter Road

13 April 1903 Inter City League	Rangers	2–2	Celtic	Glasgow
				Stadium: Ibrox Park

18 April 1903 Inter City League	Third Lanark	3–0	Celtic	Glasgow
				Stadium: Cathkin Park

20 April 1903 Inter City League	Hearts	3–0	Celtic	Edinburgh
				Stadium: Tynecastle Park

25 April 1903 Inter City League	Partick Thistle	3–0	Celtic	Glasgow
				Stadium: Meadowside

2 May 1903 Inter City League	Celtic	2–2	Dundee	Glasgow
				Stadium: Celtic Park

=== Scottish Cup ===
24 January 1903 First round	Celtic	0–0	St Mirren	Glasgow
				Stadium: Celtic Park; Attendance: 16,000

31 January 1903 First round replay	St Mirren	1–1	Celtic	Paisley
				Stadium: St Mirren Park, Love Street; Attendance: 14,000

7 February 1903 First round Second Replay	Celtic	1–0	St Mirren	Glasgow
				Stadium: Ibrox Park; Attendance: 8,000

14 February 1903 First round Third Replay	Celtic	4–0	St Mirren	Glasgow
				Stadium: Celtic Park; Attendance: 30,000

21 February 1903 Second round	Celtic	2–0	Port Glasgow Athletic	Glasgow
				Stadium: Celtic Park; Attendance: 2,000

28 February 1903 Third round	Celtic	0–3	Rangers	Glasgow
				Stadium: Celtic Park; Attendance: 40,000
