= 1906–07 Hibernian F.C. season =

Hibernian
1906–07 season
- Manager: Dan McMichael
- Scottish First Division: 11th
- Scottish Cup: Semi-Final
- Average home league attendance: 13,721 (down 618)

During the 1906–07 season Hibernian, a football club based in Edinburgh, finished eleventh out of 18 clubs in the Scottish First Division.

== Scottish First Division ==
Match Day	Date	Opponent	H/A	Score	Hibernian Scorer(s)	Attendance
1	18 August	Aberdeen	H	2–1		6,000
2	25 August	Falkirk	A	1–2		6,500
3	1 September	Queen's Park	H	2–1		6,000
4	8 September	Port Glasgow Athletic	A	2–1		3,000
5	15 September	Kilmarnock	H	1–0		5,000
6	22 September	Heart of Midlothian	A	1–4		11,500
7	24 September	Partick Thistle	A	0–3		3,000
8	29 September	Dundee	H	0–4		12,000
9	6 October	Clyde	A	1–3		4,000
10	13 October	Morton	A	1–2		2,000
11	20 October	Motherwell	H	1–1		5,000
12	27 October	St Mirren	A	1–1		4,000
13	3 November	Third Lanark	H	1–1		8,000
14	10 November	Celtic	A	1–2		8,000
15	17 November	Airdrieonians	H	4–0		4,000
16	24 November	Rangers	H	1–3		12,000
17	1 December	Kilmarnock	A	3–1		4,000
18	8 December	Morton	H	2–1		4,000
19	15 December	Hamilton Academical	A	4–2		2,000
20	22 December	Clyde	H	2–0		4,000
21	29 December	Motherwell	A	0–0		4,000
22	1 January	Hearts	H	0–0		10,000
23	2 January	Third Lanark	A	0–0		6,000
24	5 January	Port Glasgow Athletic	H	1–0		4,000
25	12 January	Rangers	A	0–1		7,000
26	19 January	St Mirren	H	2–2		5,000
27	9 February	Falkirk	H	1–2		3,000
28	16 March	Airdrieonians	A	2–3		2,000
29	15 April	Partick Thistle	H	2–2		1,500
30	20 April	Dundee	A	0–0		5,100
31	4 May	Hamilton Academical	H	0–1		1,000
32	6 May	Aberdeen	A	1–1		5,500
33	8 May	Celtic	H	0–1		10,000
34	9 May	Queen's Park	A	0–3		2,000

=== Final League table ===
P	Team	Pld	W	D	L	GF	GA	GD	Pts
10	Motherwell	34	12	9	13	45	48	–3	33
11	Hibernian	34	10	10	14	40	49	–9	30
12	Aberdeen	34	10	10	14	48	55	–13	30

=== Scottish Cup ===
Round	Date	Opponent	H/A	Score	Hibernian Scorer(s)	Attendance
R1	23 January	Forfar Athletic	H	5–0		1,500
R2	16 February	Johnstone	H	1–1		10,000
R2 R	23 February	Johnstone	A	5–0		6,000
R3	2 March	St Mirren	H	1–1		16,000
R3 R	9 March	St Mirren	A	1–1		9,000
R3 2R	23 March	St Mirren	N	2–0		15,000
SF	30 March	Celtic	A	0–0		25,000
SF R	6 April	Celtic	H	0–0		25,000
SF 2R	13 April	Celtic	A	0–3		30,000

== See also ==
- List of Hibernian F.C. seasons
