= 1906–07 Heart of Midlothian F.C. season =

Heart of Midlothian
1906–07 season
- Manager: William Waugh
- Stadium: Tynecastle Park
- Scottish First Division: 9th
- Scottish Cup: Finalists

During the 1906–07 season Hearts competed in the Scottish First Division, the Scottish Cup and the East of Scotland Shield.

== Fixtures ==
=== East of Scotland Shield ===
17 September 1906 East of Scotland Shield SF	Hearts	5–1	St Bernard's	Tynecastle Park

6 October 1906 East of Scotland Shield Final	Leith Athletic	0–1	Hearts	Old Logie Green

=== Rosebery Charity Cup ===
25 May 1907 Rosebery Charity Cup SF	Hearts	1–0	Hibernian	Tynecastle Park

1 June 1907 Rosebery Charity Cup Final	Hearts	4–1	Leith Athletic	Tynecastle Park

=== East of Scotland Cup ===
13 May 1907 East of Scotland Cup SF	Hearts	0–0 (Hearts win on corners)	Bathgate	Tynecastle Park

15 May 1907 East of Scotland Cup Final	Hearts	1–0	Hibernian	Tynecastle Park

=== Scottish Cup ===
26 January 1907 Scottish Cup R1	Hearts	0–0	Airdrieonians	Tynecastle Park
				Attendance: 23,000

9 February 1907 Scottish Cup R1 Replay	Airdrieonians	0–2	Hearts	Broomfield Park
				Attendance: 11,000

16 February 1907 Scottish Cup R2	Kilmarnock	0–0	Hearts	Rugby Park
				Attendance: 8,000

23 February 1907 Scottish Cup R2 Replay	Hearts	2–1	Kilmarnock	Tynecastle Park
				Attendance: 18,000

9 March 1907 Scottish Cup R3	Hearts	2–2	Raith Rovers	Tynecastle Park
				Attendance: 15,000

23 March 1907 Scottish Cup R3 Replay	Raith Rovers	0–1	Hearts	Stark's Park
				Attendance: 14,000

30 March 1907 Scottish Cup SF	Hearts	1–0	Queen's Park	Tynecastle Park
				Attendance: 33,000

20 April 1907 Final	Hearts	0–3	Celtic	Hampden Park
				Attendance: 50,000

=== East of Scotland League ===
15 August 1906 East of Scotland League	Hearts	3–3	Aberdeen	Tynecastle Park

20 August 1906 East of Scotland League	Hearts	5–2	Falkirk	Tynecastle Park

27 September 1906 East of Scotland League	Aberdeen	2–0	Hearts	Pittodrie Park

8 October 1908 East of Scotland League	Dundee	1–1	Hearts	Dens Park

=== Scottish First Division ===
18 August 1906 Scottish First Division	Clyde	1–3	Hearts	Tynecastle Park
				Attendance: 11,000

25 August 1906 Scottish First Division	Hearts	1–1	St Mirren	Tynecastle Park
				Attendance: 9,500

1 September 1906 Scottish First Division	Third Lanark	2–2	Hearts	Cathkin Park
				Attendance: 10,000

8 September 1906 Scottish First Division	Hearts	0–0	Dundee	Tynecastle Park
				Attendance: 11,000

15 September 1906 Scottish First Division	Celtic	3–0	Hearts	Celtic Park
				Attendance: 15,000

22 September 1906 Scottish First Division	Hearts	4–1	Hibernian	Tynecastle Park
				Attendance: 11,500

24 September 1906 Scottish First Division	Rangers	1–1	Hearts	Ibrox Park
				Attendance: 10,000

29 September 1906 Scottish First Division	Falkirk	2–1	Hearts	Brockville Park
				Attendance: 6,000

13 October 1906 Scottish First Division	Hearts	3–1	Hamilton Academical	Tynecastle Park
				Attendance: 4,500

20 October 1906 Scottish First Division	Airdrieonians	3–2	Hearts	Broomfield Park
				Attendance: 7,000

27 October 1906 Scottish First Division	Hearts	2–2	Queen's Park	Tynecastle Park
				Attendance: 8,500

3 November 1906 Scottish First Division	Aberdeen	2–3	Hearts	Pittodrie Park
				Attendance: 6,500

10 November 1906 Scottish First Division	Hearts	2–0	Port Glasgow Athletic	Tynecastle Park
				Attendance: 5,500

17 November 1906 Scottish First Division	Kilmarnock	2–2	Hearts	Rugby Park
				Attendance: 3,000

24 November 1906 Scottish First Division	Partick Thistle	1–0	Hearts	Meadowside
				Attendance: 6,000

1 December 1906 Scottish First Division	Hearts	1–0	Morton	Tynecastle Park
				Attendance: 3,500

8 December 1906 Scottish First Division	Motherwell	2–0	Hearts	Fir Park
				Attendance: 6,000

15 December 1906 Scottish First Division	Hearts	1–1	Third Lanark	Tynecastle Park
				Attendance: 4,000

22 December 1906 Scottish First Division	St Mirren	0–2	Hearts	St Mirren Park, Love Street
				Attendance: 4,000

1 January 1907 Scottish First Division	Hibernian	0–0	Hearts	Easter Road
				Attendance: 10,000

12 January 1907 Scottish First Division	Hearts	0–1	Airdrieonians	Tynecastle Park
				Attendance: 6,500

19 January 1907 Scottish First Division	Port Glasgow Athletic	0–0	Hearts	Clune Park
				Attendance: 3,000

2 March 1907 Scottish First Division	Morton	0–0	Hearts	Cappielow Park
				Attendance: 4,000

16 March 1907 Scottish First Division	Hearts	1–0	Kilmarnock	Tynecastle Park
				Attendance: 3,500

6 April 1907 Scottish First Division	Hearts	1–1	Motherwell	Tynecastle Park
				Attendance: 1,200

8 April 1907 Scottish First Division	Dundee	2–0	Hearts	Dens Park
				Attendance: 5,800

13 April 1907 Scottish First Division	Hearts	0–1	Rangers	Tynecastle Park
				Attendance: 8,000

15 April 1907 Scottish First Division	Hearts	1–1	Aberdeen	Tynecastle Park
				Attendance: 4,000

24 April 1907 Scottish First Division	Queen's Park	1–2	Hearts	Hampden Park
				Attendance: 3,000

27 April 1907 Scottish First Division	Hearts	5–1	Partick Thistle	Tynecastle Park
				Attendance: 3,000

1 May 1907 Scottish First Division	Hearts	2–1	Falkirk	Tynecastle Park
				Attendance: 2,000

4 May 1907 Scottish First Division	Hearts	0–1	Clyde	Tynecastle Park
				Attendance: 3,000

6 May 1907 Scottish First Division	Hamilton Academical	5–1	Hearts	Douglas Park
				Attendance: 1,500

11 May 1907 Scottish First Division	Hearts	3–3	Aberdeen	Tynecastle Park
				Attendance: 10,000

== See also ==
- List of Heart of Midlothian F.C. seasons
