= 1902–03 Hibernian F.C. season =

Hibernian
1902–03 season
- Manager: Dan McMichael
- Scottish First Division: 1st
- Scottish Cup: 3rd Round
- Average home league attendance: 13,721 (down 618)

During the 1902–03 season Hibernian, a football club based in Edinburgh, finished first out of 12 clubs in the Scottish First Division and won their first league title.

== Scottish First Division ==
Match Day	Date	Opponent	H/A	Score	Hibernian Scorer(s)	Attendance
1	16 August	Celtic	H	1–1		7,000
2	23 August	Port Glasgow Athletic	A	1–0		6,000
3	30 August	Queen's Park	H	3–2		6,000
4	6 September	Kilmarnock	A	4–1		4,000
5	13 September	Heart of Midlothian	H	0–0		13,000
6	15 September	Rangers	H	1–0		6,500
7	20 September	Third Lanark	A	0–1		11,000
8	27 September	Dundee	H	1–0		15,000
9	29 September	Rangers	A	5–2		15,000
10	4 October	St Mirren	H	4–3		7,500
11	11 October	Heart of Midlothian	A	1–1		14,500
12	18 October	Morton	H	3–1		4,000
13	25 October	Dundee	A	3–0		15,000
14	1 November	Partick Thistle	H	2–2		3,000
15	8 November	Queen's Park	A	3–1		5,500
16	15 November	Kilmarnock	H	2–1		5,000
17	22 November	Third Lanark	H	1–0		5,000
18	29 November	St Mirren	A	1–1		5,550
19	6 December	Morton	A	1–0		4,000
20	20 December	Partick Thistle	A	2–0		7,000
21	2 January	Celtic	A	4–0		14,000
22	31 January	Port Glasgow Athletic	H	5–1		

=== Final League table ===
P	Team	Pld	W	D	L	GF	GA	GD	Pts
1	Hibernian	22	16	5	1	48	18	30	37
2	Dundee	22	13	5	4	31	12	19	31
3	Rangers	22	12	5	5	56	24	32	29

=== Scottish Cup ===
Round	Date	Opponent	H/A	Score	Hibernian Scorer(s)	Attendance
R1	10 January	Morton	H	7–0		2,000
R2	24 January	Leith Athletic	H	4–1		8,000
R3	7 February	Dundee	A	0–0		15,000
R3 R	14 February	Dundee	H	0–0		26,000
R3 2R	21 February	Dundee	N	0–1		36,000

== See also ==
- List of Hibernian F.C. seasons
