= 1904–05 Celtic F.C. season =

Celtic
1904–05 season
- Manager: Willie Maley
- Stadium: Celtic Park
- Scottish First Division: 1st
- Scottish Cup: Semi-finalists

1904–05 was Celtic's 17th season of competitive football. They competed in the Scottish First Division, which they won for the first time since 1897-98. It was Celtic's 5th league title and 9th major title overall.

Celtic and Rangers had finished the league campaign level on 41 points, and a play-off at Hampden Park (doubling up as a fixture in the minor Glasgow Football League) was arranged to decide the championship. An English-based referee was drafted in to officiate at the match due to increasing tensions between the two groups of supporters and controversies in recent matches between the sides. Celtic won 2–1, with Jimmy McMenemy and Davie Hamilton scoring the decisive goals.

Celtic also won the Glasgow Charity Cup.

== Competitions ==
=== Scottish First Division ===
==== League table ====
Pos	Team	Pld	W	D	L	GF	GA	GD	Pts	Qualification or relegation
=1	Celtic (C)	26	18	5	3	68	31	+37	41	Champions
=1	Rangers	26	19	3	4	83	28	+55	41	
3	Third Lanark	26	14	7	5	60	28	+32	35	
4	Airdrieonians	26	11	5	10	38	45	−7	27	
5	Hibernian	26	9	8	9	39	39	0	26	

Source: SPFL Archive
(C) Champions

==== Matches ====
20 August 1904 First Division	Partick Thistle	0–5	Celtic	Glasgow
				Stadium: Meadowside; Attendance: 9,000

27 August 1904 First Division	Port Glasgow Athletic	1–4	Celtic	Port Glasgow
				Stadium: Clune Park; Attendance: 6,000

3 September 1904 First Division	Celtic	1–1	Hearts	Glasgow
				Stadium: Celtic Park; Attendance: 19,000

17 September 1904 First Division	St Mirren	2–3	Celtic	Paisley
				Stadium: St Mirren Park, Love Street

19 September 1904 First Division	Hearts	2–0	Celtic	Edinburgh
				Stadium: Tynecastle Park; Attendance: 10,000

26 September 1904 First Division	Celtic	2–1	Third Lanark	Glasgow
				Stadium: Celtic Park; Attendance: 10,000

1 October 1904 First Division	Queen's Park	2–3	Celtic	Glasgow
				Stadium: Hampden Park; Attendance: 15,000

15 October 1904 First Division	Celtic	2–2	Rangers	Glasgow
				Stadium: Celtic Park; Attendance: 25,000

22 October 1904 First Division	Third Lanark	1– 2	Celtic	Glasgow
				Stadium: Cathkin Park; Attendance: 12,000

29 October 1904 First Division	Celtic	1–1	Queen's Park	Glasgow
				Stadium: Celtic Park; Attendance: 8,000

5 November 1904 First Division	Kilmarnock	0–3	Celtic	Kilmarnock
				Stadium: Rugby Park; Attendance: 8,000

12 November 1904 First Division	Hibernian	2–2	Celtic	Edinburgh
				Stadium: Easter Road; Attendance: 7,800

19 November 1904 First Division	Celtic	3–0	Dundee	Glasgow
				Stadium: Celtic Park; Attendance: 8,000

26 November 1904 First Division	Airdrieonians	1–3	Celtic	Airdrie
				Stadium: Broomfield Park; Attendance: 7,500

3 December 1904 First Division	Celtic	4–2	Motherwell	Glasgow
				Stadium: Celtic Park; Attendance: 5,000

10 December 1904 First Division	Morton	0–1	Celtic	Greenock
				Stadium: Cappielow Park; Attendance: 5,000

17 December 1904 First Division	Celtic	2–2	Partick Thistle	Glasgow
				Stadium: Celtic Park; Attendance: 8,000

24 December 1904 First Division	Celtic	1–0	St Mirren	Glasgow
				Stadium: Celtic Park

31 December 1904 First Division	Celtic	3–1	Kilmarnock	Glasgow
				Stadium: Celtic Park; Attendance: 4,000

1 January 1905 First Division	Rangers	0–0	Celtic	Glasgow
				Stadium: Ibrox Park; Attendance: 70,000

3 January 1905 First Division	Celtic	2–3	Airdrieonians	Glasgow
				Stadium: Celtic Park; Attendance: 8,000

7 January 1905 First Division	Celtic	3–0	Port Glasgow Athletic	Glasgow
				Stadium: Celtic Park; Attendance: 2,000

14 January 1905 First Division	Dundee	2–1	Celtic	Dundee
				Stadium: Dens Park; Attendance: 13,000

21 January 1905 First Division	Celtic	2–0	Hibernian	Glasgow
				Stadium: Celtic Park; Attendance: 6,000

4 February 1905 First Division	Celtic	5–2	Morton	Glasgow
				Stadium: Celtic Park; Attendance: 3,000

18 February 1905 (Note: Originally played on 1 January, but abandoned and replayed due to crowd incursion.) First Division	Rangers	1–4	Celtic	Glasgow
				Stadium: Ibrox Park; Attendance: 71,000

4 March 1905 First Division	Motherwell	2–6	Celtic	Motherwell
				Stadium: Fir Park; Attendance: 8,000

=== First Division play-off ===
6 May 1905 First Division play-off	Celtic	2–1	Rangers	Glasgow
	McMenemy; Hamilton		Robertson	Stadium: Hampden Park; Attendance: 36,000; Referee: (England) Frederick Kirkham

=== Scottish Cup ===
28 January 1905 First round	Dumfries	1–2	Celtic	Dumfries
				Stadium: Eastfield Park; Attendance: 3,000

11 February 1905 Second round	Celtic	3–0	Lochgelly United	Glasgow
				Stadium: Celtic Park; Attendance: 2,000

25 February 1905 Third round	Celtic	3–0	Partick Thistle	Glasgow
				Stadium: Celtic Park; Attendance: 28,000

25 March 1905 Semi-final	Celtic	0–2 (Note: Abandoned after 80 minutes due to crowd disturbance; result stood.)	Rangers	Glasgow
				Stadium: Celtic Park; Attendance: 30,000; Referee: T. Robertson
