= Hugh Bolton (footballer) =

Scottish footballer

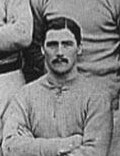

Personal information
- Date of birth: 15 November 1879
- Place of birth: Port Glasgow, Scotland
- Date of death: 28 February 1951 (aged 71)
- Place of death: United States
- Position: Inside right

Youth career
- Clydeville

Senior career*
Years	Team	Apps	(Gls)
–	Port Glasgow Athletic Juniors		
1902–1905	Port Glasgow Athletic	67	(12)
1905–1906	Newcastle United	1	(0)
1906–1908	Everton	75	(27)
1909–1910	Bradford (Park Avenue)	30	(7)
1910–1913	Morton	57	(1)
1913–1916	Glentoran		
1916–1917	Johnstone		
- * Club domestic league appearances and goals

Hugh Bolton (15 November 1879 - 28 February 1951) was a Scottish footballer who played mainly as an inside right for Port Glasgow Athletic, Newcastle United, Everton, Bradford (Park Avenue), Morton, Glentoran and Johnstone.

He had moved from hometown team Port Glasgow to English football with Newcastle in 1905, but only played one Football League match for the Magpies before moving to Everton in January 1906. Not only was his debut for his new club against his former employers, but he faced them again four months later in the 1906 FA Cup Final, which Everton won 1–0. He lost his place in the team to fellow Scot George Wilson for much of the following season but was re-instated when Wilson became involved in a dispute over his contract, and it was Bolton who played in the 1907 FA Cup Final, this time resulting in a defeat to The Wednesday. A Toffees regular in the next campaign but out of favour in the next, he moved on to Bradford at the turn of 1909.

After returning to the west of Scotland with Morton in September 1910, he spent time in Ireland with Glentoran while on the 'open to transfer' list, then finished his career with Johnstone.
