= 1903–04 Celtic F.C. season =

Celtic
1903–04 season
- Manager: Willie Maley
- Stadium: Celtic Park
- Scottish First Division: 3rd
- Scottish Cup: Winners

1903–04 was the 16th season of competitive football for Celtic FC. They competed in the Scottish First Division, in which they placed third.

Celtic won the Scottish Cup with a 3–2 win over Rangers in which Jimmy Quinn scored a hat-trick. It was Celtic's fourth Scottish Cup victory and, together with their four league titles so far, their 8th major trophy.

Willie Orr, who had been playing for the Glasgow team since 1897, became Celtic's fourth ever captain, as he succeeded Sandy McMahon who had left Celtic the previous season.

== Competitions ==
=== Scottish First Division ===
==== League table ====
Pos	Team	Pld	W	D	L	GF	GA	GD	Pts	Qualification or relegation
1	Third Lanark (C)	26	20	3	3	61	26	+35	43	Champions
2	Heart of Midlothian	26	18	3	5	63	35	+28	39	
=3	Celtic	26	18	2	6	68	27	+41	38	
=3	Rangers	26	16	6	4	80	33	+47	38	
5	Dundee	26	13	2	11	54	45	+9	28	

Source: nozdrul.plus.com
(C) Champions

==== Matches ====
15 August 1903 First Division	Celtic	2–1	Partick Thistle	Glasgow
				Stadium: Celtic Park; Attendance: 5,000

22 August 1903 First Division	St Mirren	0–1	Celtic	Paisley
				Stadium: St Mirren Park, Love Street; Attendance: 6,000

29 August 1903 First Division	Celtic	1–3	Third Lanark	Glasgow
				Stadium: Celtic Park; Attendance: 20,000

5 September 1903 First Division	Hibernian	0–2	Celtic	Edinburgh
				Stadium: Easter Road; Attendance: 9,500

26 September 1903 First Division	Celtic	1–0	Hibernian	Glasgow
				Stadium: Celtic Park; Attendance: 8,000

28 September 1903 First Division	Third Lanark	3–1	Celtic	Glasgow
				Stadium: Hampden Park; Attendance: 17,000

3 October 1903 First Division	Celtic	3–0	Queen's Park	Glasgow
				Stadium: Celtic Park; Attendance: 12,000

10 October 1903 First Division	Celtic	4–2	Dundee	Glasgow
				Stadium: Celtic Park; Attendance: 8,000

17 October 1903 First Division	Rangers	0–0	Celtic	Glasgow
				Stadium: Ibrox Park; Attendance: 24,000

24 October 1903 First Division	Celtic	4–0	Hearts	Glasgow
				Stadium: Celtic Park; Attendance: 5,000

31 October 1903 First Division	Queen's Park	1–0	Celtic	Glasgow
				Stadium: Hampden Park; Attendance: 40,000

14 November 1903 First Division	Kilmarnock	1–6	Celtic	Kilmarnock
				Stadium: Rugby Park; Attendance: 4,500

5 December 1903 First Division	Morton	0–1	Celtic	Greenock
				Stadium: Cappielow Park; Attendance: 4,500

12 December 1903 First Division	Celtic	2–1	Airdrieonians	Glasgow
				Stadium: Celtic Park

19 December 1903 First Division	Partick Thistle	0–4	Celtic	Glasgow
				Stadium: Meadowside; Attendance: 4,000

26 December 1903 First Division	Celtic	4–1	Port Glasgow Athletic	Glasgow
				Stadium: Celtic Park; Attendance: 1,500

1 January 1904 First Division	Celtic	2–2	Rangers	Glasgow
				Stadium: Celtic Park; Attendance: 33,000

9 January 1904 First Division	Airdrieonians	4–3	Celtic	Airdrie
				Stadium: Broomfield Park

16 January 1904 First Division	Celtic	6–0	Motherwell	Glasgow
				Stadium: Celtic Park; Attendance: 2,000

23 January 1904 First Division	Celtic	5–1	Morton	Glasgow
				Stadium: Celtic Park; Attendance: 3,000

30 January 1904 First Division	Dundee	2–1	Celtic	Dundee
				Stadium: Dens Park; Attendance: 17,700

6 February 1904 First Division	Port Glasgow Athletic	2–3	Celtic	Port Glasgowe
				Stadium: Clune Park

12 March 1904 First Division	Celtic	3–1	St Mirren	Glasgow
				Stadium: Celtic Park; Attendance: 5,000

26 March 1904 First Division	Motherwell	1–2	Celtic	Motherwell
				Stadium: Fir Park; Attendance: 5,000

2 April 1904 First Division	Hearts	2–1	Celtic	Edinburgh
				Stadium: Tynecastle Park; Attendance: 11,000

23 April 1904 First Division	Celtic	6–1	Kilmarnock	Glasgow
				Stadium: Celtic Park; Attendance: 4,000

=== Scottish Cup ===
16 January 1904 First round	Celtic	w/o	Stanley	Glasgow
				Stadium: Celtic Park

13 February 1904 Second round	St Bernard's	0–4	Celtic	Edinburgh
				Stadium: Royal Gymnasium Ground; Attendance: 5,000

20 February 1904 Third round	Celtic	1–1	Dundee	Glasgow
				Stadium: Celtic Park; Attendance: 18,000

27 February 1904 Third round replay	Dundee	0–0	Celtic	Dundee
				Stadium: Dens Park; Attendance: 21,000

5 March 1904 Third round Second Replay	Celtic	5–0	Dundee	Glasgow
				Stadium: Celtic Park; Attendance: 39,000

19 March 1904 Semi-final	Celtic	2–1	Third Lanark	Glasgow
				Stadium: Celtic Park; Attendance: 36,000

16 April 1904 Final	Celtic	3–2	Rangers	Glasgow
				Stadium: Hampden Park; Attendance: 64,472
