= 1906–07 Celtic F.C. season =

Celtic
1906–07 season
- Manager: Willie Maley
- Stadium: Celtic Park
- Scottish First Division: 1st
- Scottish Cup: Winners

During the 1906–07 Scottish football season, their 19th season of competitive football, Celtic competed in the Scottish First Division and the Scottish Cup, winning both competitions.

This was their third League title in a row, the first time Celtic achieved that feature, as well as the first ever League and Cup double for the Glasgow team. In fact, it was the first time a Scottish team managed to achieve the domestic double in the 17 years the Scottish Cup and the League had coexisted so far.

1906 was the first year that Jimmy Hay captained Celtic. He was the fifth captain in Celtic history.

The Celtic team did not concede a goal in any of their first six league matches, a record which stood until beaten by Rangers 114 years later, at the start of the 2020–21 Scottish Premiership season.

== Competitions ==
=== Scottish First Division ===
==== League table ====
Pos	Team	Pld	W	D	L	GF	GA	GD	Pts	Qualification or relegation
1	Celtic (C)	34	23	9	2	80	30	+50	55	Champions
2	Dundee	34	18	12	4	53	26	+27	48	
3	Rangers	34	19	7	8	69	33	+36	45	
4	Airdrieonians	34	18	6	10	59	44	+15	42	
5	Falkirk	34	17	7	10	73	58	+15	41	

(C) Champions

==== Matches ====
18 August 1906 First Division	Motherwell	0–6	Celtic	Motherwell
				Stadium: Fir Park; Attendance: 12,000

25 August 1906 First Division	Celtic	5–0	Kilmarnock	Glasgow
				Stadium: Celtic Park; Attendance: 28,000

1 September 1906 First Division	Morton	0–2	Celtic	Greenock
				Stadium: Cappielow Park; Attendance: 8,000

15 September 1906 First Division	Celtic	3–0	Hearts	Glasgow
				Stadium: Celtic Park; Attendance: 15,000

24 September 1906 First Division	Celtic	2–0	Third Lanark	Glasgow
				Stadium: Celtic Park; Attendance: 13,000

29 September 1906 First Division	Airdrieonians	0–2	Celtic	Airdrie
				Stadium: Broomfield Park; Attendance: 25,000

13 October 1906 First Division	Celtic	2–1	Aberdeen	Glasgow
				Stadium: Celtic Park; Attendance: 14,000

20 October 1906 First Division	Dundee	0–0	Celtic	Dundee
				Stadium: Dens Park; Attendance: 27,000

27 October 1906 First Division	Celtic	2–1	Rangers	Glasgow
				Stadium: Celtic Park; Attendance: 34,000

3 November 1906 First Division	Hamilton Academical	2–5	Celtic	Hamilton
				Stadium: Douglas Park; Attendance: 11,000

10 November 1906 First Division	Celtic	2–1	Hibernian	Glasgow
				Stadium: Celtic Park; Attendance: 8,000

17 November 1906 First Division	Falkirk	2–3	Celtic	Falkirk
				Stadium: Brockville Park; Attendance: 9,000

24 November 1906 First Division	Celtic	3–3	Clyde	Glasgow
				Stadium: Celtic Park; Attendance: 12,000

1 December 1906 First Division	Celtic	4–1	Partick Thistle	Glasgow
				Stadium: Celtic Park; Attendance: 8,000

8 December 1906 First Division	St Mirren	0–3	Celtic	Paisley
				Stadium: St Mirren Park, Love Street; Attendance: 8,000

15 December 1906 First Division	Queen's Park	0–4	Celtic	Glasgow
				Stadium: Hampden Park; Attendance: 12,000

22 December 1906 First Division	Celtic	4–0	Port Glasgow Athletic	Glasgow
				Stadium: Celtic Park; Attendance: 6,000

29 December 1906 First Division	Kilmarnock	2–2	Celtic	Kilmarnock
				Stadium: Rugby Park; Attendance: 5,000

31 December 1906 First Division	Celtic	2–1	Airdrieonains	Glasgow
				Stadium: Celtic Park; Attendance: 9,000

1 January 1907 First Division	Rangers	2–1	Celtic	Glasgow
				Stadium: Ibrox Park; Attendance: 65,000

2 January 1907 First Division	Celtic	2–0	Hamilton Academical	Glasgow
				Stadium: Celtic Park; Attendance: 3,000

5 January 1907 First Division	Celtic	3–2	Falkirk	Glasgow
				Stadium: Celtic Park; Attendance: 16,000

12 January 1907 First Division	Clyde	0–2	Celtic	Glasgow
				Stadium: Shawfield Stadium; Attendance: 20,000

19 January 1907 First Division	Celtic	2–1	Morton	Glasgow
				Stadium: Celtic Park; Attendance: 10,000

2 March 1907 First Division	Aberdeen	2–2	Celtic	Aberdeen
				Stadium: Pittodrie Park; Attendance: 8,000

16 March 1907 First Division	Third Lanark	2–1	Celtic	Glasgow
				Stadium: Cathkin Park; Attendance: 9,000

23 March 1907 First Division	Celtic	0–0	Dundee	Glasgow
				Stadium: Celtic Park; Attendance: 29,000

1 April 1907 First Division	Celtic	2–1	Queen's Park	Glasgow
				Stadium: Celtic Park; Attendance: 8,000

24 April 1907 First Division	Partick Thistle	0–2	Celtic	Glasgow
				Stadium: Meadowside; Attendance: 4,000

27 April 1907 First Division	Celtic	1–1	St Mirren	Glasgow
				Stadium: Celtic Park; Attendance: 7,000

4 May 1907 First Division	Port Glasgow Athletic	1–1	Celtic	Port Glasgow
				Stadium: Clune Park; Attendance: 1,500

8 May 1907 First Division	Hibernian	0–1	Celtic	Edinburgh
				Stadium: Easter Road; Attendance: 10,000

11 May 1907 First Division	Heart of Midlothian	3–3	Celtic	Edinburgh
				Stadium: Tynecastle Park; Attendance: 10,000

15 May 1907 First Division	Celtic	1–1	Motherwell	Glasgow
				Stadium: Celtic Park; Attendance: 3,000

=== Scottish Cup ===
2 February 1907 First round	Celtic	2–1	Clyde	Glasgow
				Stadium: Celtic Park; Attendance: 25,000

9 February 1907 Second round	Morton	0–0	Celtic	Greenock
				Stadium: Cappielow Park; Attendance: 11,000

16 February 1907 Second round replay	Celtic	1–1	Morton	Glasgow
				Stadium: Celtic Park; Attendance: 25,000

23 February 1907 Second round Second Replay	Celtic	2–1	Morton	Glasgow
				Stadium: Celtic Park; Attendance: 30,000

9 March 1907 Third round	Rangers	0–3	Celtic	Glasgow
				Stadium: Ibrox Park; Attendance: 60,000

30 March 1907 Semi-final	Celtic	0–0	Hibernian	Glasgow
				Stadium: Celtic Park; Attendance: 25,000

6 April 1907 Semi-final Replay	Hibernian	0–0	Celtic	Edinburgh
				Stadium: Easter Road; Attendance: 25,000

13 April 1907 Semi-final Second Replay	Celtic	3–0	Hibernian	Glasgow
				Stadium: Celtic Park; Attendance: 30,000

20 April 1907 Final	Celtic	3–0	Hearts	Glasgow
				Stadium: Hampden Park; Attendance: 50,000
