= 1906 Scottish Cup final =

1906 Scottish Cup Final
- Event: 1905–06 Scottish Cup
Heart of Midlothian	Third Lanark
1	0
- Date: 28 April 1906
- Venue: Ibrox Park, Govan
- Referee: R.T. Murray
- Attendance: 30,000

The 1906 Scottish Cup Final was played on 28 April 1906 at Ibrox Park in Govan (today part of Glasgow) and was the final of the 33rd season of the Scottish Cup. Heart of Midlothian and Third Lanark contested the match, won 1–0 by Hearts thanks to an 81st-minute goal from George Wilson.

== Final ==
28 April 1906

Heart of Midlothian	1 – 0	Third Lanark
G. Wilson 81'

ibrox Park, Govan
Attendance: 30,000

=== Teams ===
Hearts:
GK	(Scotland) George Philip
RB	(Scotland) Harry McNaught
LB	(Scotland) David Philip
RH	(Scotland) Frank McLaren
CH	(Scotland) Charlie Thomson
LH	(Scotland) James Dickson
RW	(Scotland) George Couper
IR	(Scotland) Bobby Walker
CF	(Scotland) Alex Menzies
IL	(Scotland) David Wilson
LW	(Scotland) George Wilson

Third Lanark:
GK	(Scotland) Jimmy Raeside
RB	(Scotland) Robert Barr
LB	(Scotland) David Hill
RH	(Scotland) John Cross
CH	(Scotland) John Neilson
LH	(Scotland) James Comrie
RW	(Scotland) James Johnston
IR	(Scotland) Robert Graham
CF	(Scotland) Willie Reid
IL	(Scotland) Hughie Wilson
LW	(Scotland) David Munro
