= William Semple =

William Semple may refer to:

- William Semple (footballer) (1861–1940), Scottish footballer
- William F. Semple, American dentist, commonly referred to as the first person to patent a chewing gum
- Billy Semple (born 1946), Scottish footballer.

== See also ==
- William Sempill, 2nd Lord Sempill, Scottish lord
