= Robert Graham (footballer, born 1882) =

Scottish footballer

Personal information
- Date of birth: 1882
- Place of birth: Glasgow, Scotland
- Height: 5 ft 7 in (1.70 m)
- Position: Inside right

Youth career
- 1898–1900: Cartha
- 1900–1902: Queen's Park

Senior career*
Years	Team	Apps	(Gls)
1902–1904	Third Lanark	38	(14)
1904–1905	Fulham	24	(0)
1905–1906	Third Lanark	23	(6)
1906–1908	Everton	2	(0)
1908–1909	Bolton Wanderers	0	(0)
1909–1911	Partick Thistle	15	(0)
- * Club domestic league appearances and goals

Robert Graham (born 1882) was a Scottish footballer who played as an inside right. After beginning his career in the reserves at Queen's Park, he was a member of the Third Lanark team which won the Scottish Football League title in the 1903–04 season, as well as claiming a Glasgow Cup; he then spent the next year at Fulham, causing him to miss out on a Scottish Cup win in 1905. He returned to Thirds and played in the 1906 Scottish Cup Final, which ended in defeat to Heart of Midlothian.

Graham then reverted to English football, spending two years with Everton (where he was unable to displace the established Hugh Bolton and Jimmy Settle, was not selected for the 1907 FA Cup Final and spent almost all his time with the reserves) and one with Bolton Wanderers before joining another Glasgow club, Partick Thistle, in 1909.
