= Meadowside Granary =

Coordinates: 55.8690°N 4.3208°W

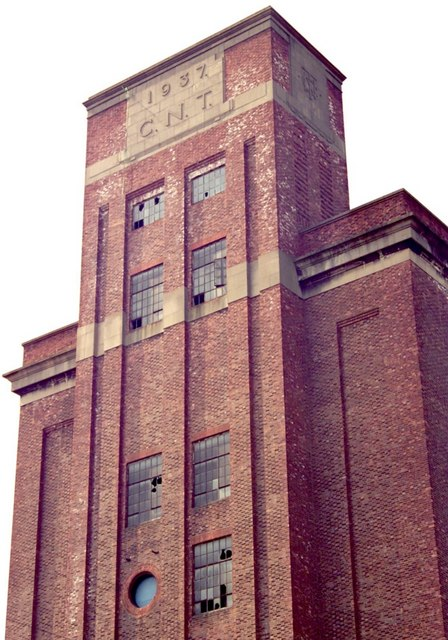
The derelict 1937 building, shortly before demolition

Meadowside Granary was a complex of four interlinked granary buildings situated on the north bank of the River Clyde in the Partick area of Glasgow, Scotland. Constructed in four phases between 1911 and 1967, the finished construction was the largest brick building in Europe at the time. The granary closed in 1988 and was demolished in 2002; the site is now occupied by part of the Glasgow Harbour re-development.

== History ==
The first Meadowside Granary was a thirteen-storey, thirteen-bay brick building. Both it and the adjacent Meadowside Quay were built by Glasgow engineer William Alston for the Clyde Navigation Trust between 1911 and 1913. The site, on the north bank of the River Clyde at Castlebank Street, Partick, (Note: Partick was an independent burgh until it was incorporated into the city of Glasgow in 1912.) was formerly Meadowside football ground, which had been the home of Partick Thistle F.C. from 1897 until 1908. During construction, damage was caused by a severe storm on 27 November 1912 that blew down four cranes at the site. After opening, Meadowside became the most important grain store in the United Kingdom during World War I.

The granary was first extended in 1937, when a second building was added. A further extension in 1960 cost £3 million and added 50,000 tons of capacity to double the existing storage. The fourth and final building was completed in 1967 and added a further 80,000 tons at a cost of £1.5 million. High level gantries were added to link the buildings. When completed, the Meadowside complex was reputed to be the largest grain storage facility in the UK and the largest brick building in Europe, with over twenty million bricks used in its construction.

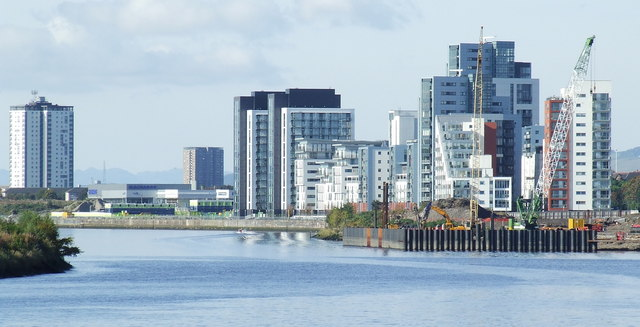
The Glasgow Harbour development now occupies the former granary site

The Upper Clyde was still a thriving port in the 1960s, but shipping declined thereafter. Meadowside was closed in 1988 and finally demolished in 2002. Port operators Clydeport (Note: The Clyde Port Authority, which had succeeded the Clyde Navigation Trust, was by then operating as Clydeport plc.) was taken over in 2003 by the Peel Group, who subsequently used the land for the first phase of the Glasgow Harbour regeneration project. The site of the granary is now occupied by residential apartments.
