= Jock Walker =

Scottish footballer

Personal information
- Full name: John Walker
- Date of birth: 17 November 1883
- Place of birth: Beith, Scotland
- Date of death: 16 December 1968 (aged 86)
- Place of death: Swindon, England
- Position: Left back

Senior career*
Years	Team	Apps	(Gls)
1900–1901	Eastern Burnside		
1901–1902	Cambuslang Rangers		
1902–1903	Burnbank Athletic		
1903–1904	Raith Rovers	7	(0)
1904–1907	Rangers	14	(0)
1904–1905	→ Beith (loan)		
1905	→ Ayr Parkhouse (loan)		
1905	→ Royal Albert (loan)		
1906–1907	→ Cowdenbeath (loan)	19	(1)
1907–1913	Swindon Town	223	(0)
1913–1921	Middlesbrough	106	(0)
1915–1916	→ Swindon Town (guest)	9	(0)
1921–1923	Reading	59	(0)

International career
1911–1913	Scotland	9	(0)
	Southern League XI	4	
- * Club domestic league appearances and goals

John Walker (17 November 1883 – 16 December 1968) was a Scottish professional footballer who played as a left back and is perhaps best remembered for his six seasons in the Southern League with Swindon Town. He also played in the Scottish League for Raith Rovers, Rangers and Cowdenbeath and in the Football League for Middlesbrough and Reading. After retiring from football he ran a fish-and-chip shop in Swindon.

Walker won nine caps for Scotland at international level (Note: In the Scottish Football Association's website profile, Walker's record has been appended in error onto that of John Walker (footballer, born 1873) who gained 5 caps / 3 goals between 1895 and 1904.) and represented the Southern League XI.

== Career statistics ==
Appearances and goals by club, season and competition
Club	Season	League			National Cup		Other		Total	
Club	Season	Division	Apps	Goals	Apps	Goals	Apps	Goals	Apps	Goals
Raith Rovers	1903–04	Scottish League Division Two	7	0	0	0	—		7	0
Rangers	1905–06 (Note: In the source, Walker's one-year Rangers spell has been appended in error onto that of John Walker born 1873, whose career as a forward with the club ended at the same time as the younger player arrived.)	Scottish League Division One	14	0	0	0	—		14	0
Cowdenbeath (loan)	1906–07	Scottish League Division Two	19	1	6	0	—		25	1
Swindon Town	1907–08	Southern League First Division	38	0	4	0	0	0	42	0
Swindon Town	1908–09	Southern League First Division	39	0	1	0	0	0	40	0
Swindon Town	1909–10	Southern League First Division	40	0	5	0	3 (Note: Appearances in Southern League Cup)	0	48	0
Swindon Town	1910–11	Southern League First Division	36	0	4	0	6	0	46	0
Swindon Town	1911–12	Southern League First Division	31	0	7	0	0	0	38	0
Swindon Town	1912–13	Southern League First Division	30	0	3	0	1	0	34	0
Swindon Town	Total		223	0	24	0	10	0	257	0
Middlesbrough	1913–14	First Division	37	0	1	0	—		38	0
Middlesbrough	1914–15	First Division	33	0	1	0	—		34	0
Middlesbrough	1919–20	First Division	34	0	1	0	—		35	0
Middlesbrough	1920–21	First Division	2	0	0	0	—		2	0
Middlesbrough	Total		106	0	3	0	—		109	0
Reading	1921–22	Third Division South	31	0	—		—		31	0
Reading	1922–23	Third Division South	28	0	—		—		28	0
Reading	Total		59	0	—		—		59	0
Career total			428	1	33	0	10	0	471	1

== Honours ==
Swindon Town

- Southern League First Division: 1910–11

Individual

- Cowdenbeath Hall of Fame
