= Jimmy Weir (footballer, born 1887) =

Scottish footballer

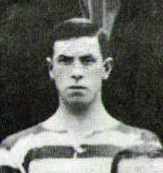

Personal information
- Full name: James Weir
- Date of birth: 23 August 1887
- Place of birth: Muirkirk, Scotland
- Date of death: 1959 (aged 71–72)
- Place of death: Redcar, England

Youth career
- Burnfoothill Thistle
- Dunaskin Lads

Senior career*
Years	Team	Apps	(Gls)
1904–1907	Ayr	74	(1)
1907–1910	Celtic	81	(1)
1910–1915	Middlesbrough	113	(0)
Total		268	(2)
- * Club domestic league appearances and goals

James Weir (23 August 1887 – 1959) was a Scottish footballer who played as a left back for Ayr and Celtic in Scotland and Middlesbrough in England.

Having been brought to reigning Scottish Football League title holders Celtic to replace the veteran Willie Orr, he helped the club to win three further championships in succession from 1907–08 to 1908–10, adding a Scottish Cup winner's medal in 1908 (he also played in the 1909 final in which the trophy was withdrawn after supporters rioted following a drawn replay at Hampden Park) and wins in the Glasgow Merchants Charity Cup (1907–08) and the Glasgow Cup (1909–10). However, Joe Dodds then became the first-choice left back.

After moving to Middlesbrough in 1910, Weir joined up with a former colleague at Celtic Park, Donald McLeod, and was a regular for Boro in his first three seasons then had a more limited role in two subsequent campaigns leading up to the suspension of regular competitions with the escalation of World War I, including the contribution of eight matches in the 1913–14 Football League which brought the club's highest-ever finishing position of third. He later ran a pub in nearby Redcar.
