= David Wilson (footballer, born 1881) =

Scottish footballer

Personal information
- Date of birth: 31 January 1881
- Place of birth: Lochgelly, Scotland
- Place of death: Canada
- Position: Inside left

Senior career*
| Years | Team | Apps | (Gls) |
| – | Lochgelly Rangers | | |
| – | Buckhaven United | | |
| 1901–1902 | Gainsborough Trinity | | |
| 1902–1903 | Cowdenbeath | | |
| 1903–1904 | East Fife | | |
| 1904–1906 | Heart of Midlothian | 46 | (6) |
| 1904 | → Gainsborough Trinity (loan) | | |
| 1906–1907 | Everton | 5 | (0) |
| 1907–1908 | Portsmouth | | |
- * Club domestic league appearances and goals

David Wilson (born 31 January 1881) was a Scottish footballer who played as an inside left.

Born in Fife, he originally played for local teams including Cowdenbeath and East Fife, as well as a spell in England with Gainsborough Trinity, before joining Heart of Midlothian in 1904, following the path taken by his younger brother George who had signed for the Edinburgh club a year earlier. He was loaned back out to Gainsborough Trinity before becoming an increasingly regular figure in the Hearts side, culminating in an appearance in the 1906 Scottish Cup Final, won by his team with a goal from George Wilson.

Within a few weeks of their cup win, both brothers were signed by Everton. However, while he had played alongside his sibling at Hearts, David Wilson had a reserve role at Goodison Park (behind George at inside left and Harold Hardman, the established outside left) and only made five league appearances. During their time in Liverpool, the Wilsons also endured the loss of two of their brothers back in Scotland in separate incidents.

In summer 1907 Wilson moved on to Portsmouth (his brother was blocked by the Football Association from making the same move in a registration dispute, and later had much success with Newcastle United). He is believed to have retired from professional football after one season at Fratton Park.

He later emigrated to Canada, again along with his brother.
