= David Philip =

Scottish footballer

Personal information
- Full name: David Carswell Philip
- Date of birth: 1880
- Place of birth: Dundee, Scotland
- Date of death: 29 April 1917 (aged 36–37)
- Place of death: Pas-de-Calais, France
- Position: Half back

Senior career*
Years	Team	Apps	(Gls)
–1903	Edinburgh Myrtle		
1903–1910	Heart of Midlothian	85	(1)
1909–1910	→ Leith Athletic (loan)	22	(0)
1910–1914	Raith Rovers	83	(0)
- * Club domestic league appearances and goals

David Carswell Philip (1880 – 29 April 1917) was a Scottish professional footballer who played as a half back in the Scottish League for Heart of Midlothian, Raith Rovers and Leith Athletic.

== Personal life ==
Philip worked as a clerk for Edinburgh Corporation Tramways. He served as an enlisted man in the Royal Scots early in the First World War and arrived on the Western Front in June 1916. Philip was commissioned as a second lieutenant into the Royal Northumberland Fusiliers on 2 April 1917 and was reported missing (later presumed dead) less than a month later on the Western Front. He is commemorated on the Arras Memorial.

== Career statistics ==
Appearances and goals by club, season and competition
Club	Season	League			Scottish Cup		Total	
Club	Season	Division	Apps	Goals	Apps	Goals	Apps	Goals
Heart of Midlothian	1903–04	Scottish First Division	12	0	0	0	12	0
Heart of Midlothian	1904–05	Scottish First Division	14	0	0	0	14	0
Heart of Midlothian	1905–06	Scottish First Division	14	0	5	0	19	0
Heart of Midlothian	1906–07	Scottish First Division	17	1	3	0	20	1
Heart of Midlothian	1907–08	Scottish First Division	19	0	1	0	10	0
Heart of Midlothian	1908–09	Scottish First Division	9	0	0	0	9	0
Heart of Midlothian	Total		85	1	9	0	94	1
Leith Athletic (loan)	1909–10	Scottish Second Division	22	0	10	0	32	0
Raith Rovers	1910–11	Scottish First Division	25	0	1	0	26	0
Raith Rovers	1911–12	Scottish First Division	28	0	2	0	30	0
Raith Rovers	1912–13	Scottish First Division	28	0	2	0	30	0
Raith Rovers	1913–14	Scottish First Division	2	0	0	0	2	0
Raith Rovers	Total		83	0	5	0	88	0
Career total			190	1	24	0	214	1

== Honours ==
Heart of Midlothian

- Scottish Cup: 1905–06
- East of Scotland Shield: 1903–04, 1905–06, 1906–07
- East of Scotland Cup: 1905–06
- East of Scotland Cup & Wilson Cup: 1906–07
