= Frank McLaren =

Scottish footballer

Personal information
- Full name: Francis McLaren
- Date of birth: 1881
- Place of birth: Kilsyth, Scotland
- Date of death: 1961 (aged 79–80)
- Place of death: Coatbridge, Scotland
- Positions: Right half; centre half

Senior career*
Years	Team	Apps	(Gls)
–	Earnock Rovers		
1905–1912	Heart of Midlothian	161	(17)
1912–1914	Hamilton Academical	38	(0)
Total		199	(17)
- * Club domestic league appearances and goals

Francis McLaren (1881 – 1961) was a Scottish footballer who played as a right half or centre half. He spent the bulk of his professional career with Heart of Midlothian where he was a regular for seven years, winning the Scottish Cup in 1906 and also appearing on the losing side in the 1907 final. He also had two years with Hamilton Academical, acting as mentor to younger players such as William McNamee.
