= George Wilson (footballer, born 1883) =

Scottish footballer

Personal information
- Full name: George Williamson Wilson
- Date of birth: 8 September 1883
- Place of birth: Lochgelly, Scotland
- Date of death: 31 May 1960 (aged 76)
- Place of death: Vancouver, Canada
- Height: 5 ft 6 in (1.68 m)
- Positions: Outside left; inside left

Youth career
- Thomson Rovers

Senior career*
| Years | Team | Apps | (Gls) |
| 1902–1903 | Cowdenbeath | | |
| 1903–1906 | Heart of Midlothian | 75 | (29) |
| 1906–1907 | Everton | 28 | (3) |
| 1907 | Distillery | | |
| 1907–1915 | Newcastle United | 176 | (25) |
| 1915–1920 | Raith Rovers | 57 | (4) |
| 1920–1921 | East Fife | | |
- Vancouver St Andrew's
| Total | | 336 | (61) |

International career
| 1904–1909 | Scotland | 6 | (0) |
| 1906 | Scottish League XI | 1 | (0) |

Managerial career
- 1926–1927: Raith Rovers
- * Club domestic league appearances and goals

George Williamson Wilson (8 September 1883 – 31 May 1960) was a Scottish professional footballer, who spent the greatest part of his career with Newcastle United and also played for Heart of Midlothian and Everton.

== Playing career ==
An outside left, Wilson began his career with a series of local Fife clubs, including then non-league Cowdenbeath. In 1903 he signed for First Division Heart of Midlothian, at that time struggling due to financial concerns. An economic restructuring in 1905 revitalised the club though, and Wilson was a regular in the side as Hearts finished 2nd in the league and won the Scottish Cup in 1905–06 – he scored the winning goal in the final against holders Third Lanark, a tap-in in the 81st minute after a Bobby Walker shot had been blocked.

Wilson moved south to England at that season's conclusion, sold to Everton in a £725 joint deal alongside his brother David. His stay on Merseyside was brief however, and ended in a bitter dispute with the club over a registration issue and a potential transfer to Portsmouth (the club his brother did successfully join in the close season), during which he missed out on a place in the 1907 FA Cup Final team, and vowed that he would not play for Everton again and would quit the game if necessary. During their stay in Liverpool, the Wilsons also endured the loss of two of their brothers at home in separate incidents.

After a short spell with Irish side Distillery whilst still registered as an Everton player, Wilson joined Newcastle United for £1,600 in November 1907, a then record transfer fee. Playing on the left wing, he made 218 appearances and scored 33 goals for the Magpies, helping them to the English League title in the 1908–09 season and the FA Cup in 1910. Wilson was nicknamed "Smiler" during his time on Tyneside, although this was a sarcastic epithet, as he was a rather dour character. He was small in height (5' 6") but a big build meant that he was not easily pushed off the ball.

Wilson was a full international, making his debut for the Scotland national team in a 1–1 draw with Wales at Dens Park in 1904. He earned six caps in total, four while with Hearts and one each during his time at Everton and Newcastle. His final international appearance occurred in a 2–0 defeat by England in 1909. Wilson also represented the Scottish League XI once, in 1906.

The First World War interrupted the latter part of Wilson's career and he served as an able seaman in the Royal Navy during the conflict. From 1914 onward he played with East Fife then Raith Rovers back in his native Fife, as well as Lanarkshire side Albion Rovers. Wilson was also manager of Raith Rovers for a time, although he resigned this position and emigrated to Canada.

== Honours ==
Heart of Midlothian

- Scottish Cup: 1906

Newcastle United

- Football League: 1908–09
- FA Cup: 1910
  - Runner-up 1908, 1911
