= 1902–03 Scottish Division One =

10th season of top-tier football league in Scotland

Scottish Division One
- Season: 1902–03
- Champions: Hibernian; 1st title
- Matches: 132
- Goals: 429 (3.25 per match)
- Top goalscorer: David Reid (14 goals)

The 1902–03 Scottish Division One season was won by Hibernian by six points over nearest rival Dundee.

== League table ==
Pos	Team	Pld	W	D	L	GF	GA	GD	Pts	Qualification or relegation
1	Hibernian (C)	22	16	5	1	48	18	+30	37	Champions
2	Dundee	22	13	5	4	31	12	+19	31	
3	Rangers	22	12	5	5	56	24	+32	29	
4	Heart of Midlothian	22	11	6	5	46	27	+19	28	
5	Celtic	22	8	10	4	36	30	+6	26	
6	St Mirren	22	7	8	7	39	40	−1	22	
7	Third Lanark	22	8	5	9	34	27	+7	21	
8	Partick Thistle	22	6	7	9	34	50	−16	19	
9	Kilmarnock	22	6	4	12	24	43	−19	16	
10	Queen's Park	22	5	5	12	33	48	−15	15	
11	Port Glasgow Athletic	22	3	5	14	26	49	−23	11	
12	Morton	22	2	5	15	22	55	−33	9	

Source: nozdrul.plus.com
(C) Champions

== Results ==
Home \ Away	CEL	DND	HOM	HIB	KIL	MOR	PAR	PGA	QPA	RAN	STM	THI
Celtic		2–2	2–2	0–4	3–1	1–1	4–1	3–0	1–1	1–1	2–2	1–0
Dundee	2–0		0–1	0–3	2–0	3–0	3–0	2–1	2–0	3–1	2–1	0–0
Heart of Midlothian	1–2	0–2		1–1	1–1	3–0	4–2	3–1	4–0	2–1	1–3	3–1
Hibernian	1–1	1–0	0–0		2–1	3–1	2–2	5–1	3–2	1–0	4–3	1–0
Kilmarnock	1–3	0–2	1–3	1–4		4–2	2–0	1–0	1–1	0–0	2–3	2–2
Morton	0–2	0–2	3–2	0–1	0–1		3–3	4–3	1–2	0–4	2–3	0–3
Partick Thistle	0–0	0–2	2–2	0–2	2–1	1–1		4–2	4–2	2–4	2–2	1–0
Port Glasgow Athletic	1–1	0–0	0–3	0–1	0–1	3–0	0–3		4–0	0–3	3–2	0–0
Queen's Park	2–1	0–0	2–5	1–3	2–3	4–0	4–1	2–2		0–2	1–1	2–1
Rangers	3–3	1–1	2–1	2–5	5–0	4–1	9–0	4–2	3–2		2–2	2–0
St Mirren	3–1	1–0	1–1	1–1	4–0	1–1	0–3	2–2	3–1	0–1		1–2
Third Lanark	1–2	0–1	0–3	1–0	2–0	2–2	1–1	5–1	3–2	4–2	6–0	

Legend: Blue = home team win; Yellow = draw; Red = away team win.
