= Bill White (footballer, born 1877) =

Scottish footballer (1877–1960)

Personal information
- Full name: William White
- Date of birth: 1877
- Place of birth: Edinburgh, Scotland
- Date of death: 1960 (aged 82–83)
- Height: 5 ft 10 in (1.78 m)
- Position: Inside forward

Senior career*
Years	Team	Apps	(Gls)
1894	Broxburn		
1896–1897	Heart of Midlothian	3	(0)
1897–1899	Woolwich Arsenal	39	(16)
1899	New Brompton	3	(0)
1899-1900	West Calder		
1899–1901	Queens Park Rangers	25	(8)
1901–1902	Liverpool	6	(1)
1902–1903	Dundee		
1903–1904	Middlesbrough	7	(0)
1904	Motherwell	5	(0)
1904–?	Broxburn		
- * Club domestic league appearances and goals

William White (1877–1960) was a professional association football player of the late nineteenth and early twentieth century. He played for Heart of Midlothian, Woolwich Arsenal, New Brompton, Queens Park Rangers and Liverpool, and made a total of 45 appearances in The Football League, scoring 17 goals.

== Career ==
White signed for Heart of Midlothian on 30 May 1896 and made his debut for the club in a friendly on 17 August against Leith Athletic in which he also scored. He made his league debut a month later on 19 September against Dundee and went on to make a further 2 league appearances. He scored his only other goal for Hearts on his last appearance for the club in a friendly against Blackburn Rovers on 26 April 1897.

He was then sold to Woolwich Arsenal, playing in the Second Division, on 1 July 1897 and made his debut and also scored on 1 September against Grismby Town. Across his 3-year stay at the club, White made 39 league appearances and scored 16 times, including a hat-trick against Newton Heath on 3 December 1898.

After playing his last match for Arsenal on 4 March 1899 against Small Heath, White signed for New Brompton, who were playing in the Southern League Division One, and made 3 appearances in the remaining season. On 7 September, White signed for Scottish team West Calder, before then signing on 2 November for Queens Park Rangers, who had just turned professional and were playing in the Southern League. He was part of the team that beat Wolverhampton Wanderers, who were playing in the First Division, 1-0 in the FA Cup in a first round replay on 31 January 1900.

On 30 May 1901, White signed for Liverpool, but was ineligible to play until 1 September. He made his debut on 14 September against rivals Everton and he scored in the second minute, becoming the first Liverpool player to score on his debut in the Merseyside derby. This was a feat that was not matched until 117 years later, when Virgil van Dijk scored on 5 January 2018. White went on to make a further 5 appearances for Liverpool.

White left Liverpool at the end of the season and signed for Dundee on 9 July 1902. On 2 May 1903, he signed for Middlesbrough after initially wanting to sign for a London club. He made his debut in a 4-1 loss to Sheffield Wednesday on 5 September and went on to make a further 6 league appearances. White then signed for Aberdeen on 2 May 1904; however, this was then voided by the Scottish Football Association. Aberdeen then again tried to sign White, but he eventually moved to Motherwell on 16 August after they offered a "substantial sum". White made 5 appearances for Motherwell before deciding to move to Broxburn on 10 December 1904, where he had started his career.

After retiring from football, White became a miner in Broxburn.
