= David Reid (Hibernian footballer) =

Scottish footballer

Personal information
- Place of birth: Scotland

Senior career*
Years	Team	Apps	(Gls)
–	Carluke Milton Rovers		
1900–1901	Hibernian	1	(0)
1901–1902	Motherwell	7	(1)
1902–1906	Hibernian	24	(19)
- * Club domestic league appearances and goals

David Reid was a Scottish footballer who played for Hibernian and Motherwell. He finished as the top scorer in Scottish Football League Division One in the 1902–03 season, scoring 14 goals as Hibernian won the Scottish league championship for the first time in their history.

Items relating to Reid's career, including his league championship medal, were featured on the Antiques Roadshow in January 2024.
