= Glasgow Harbour =

Urban development in Glasgow, Scotland

Coordinates: 55.868147°N 4.316599°W

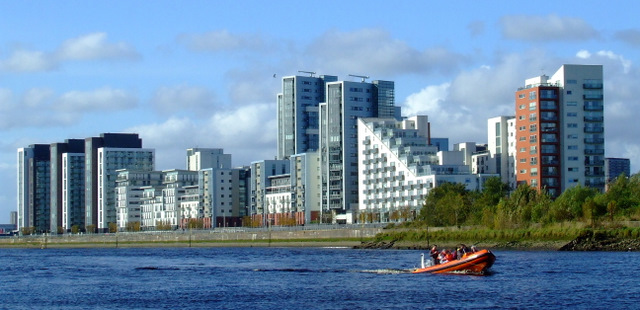
Phases 1 and 2 of Glasgow Harbour in 2011

Glasgow Harbour is a private sector urban regeneration scheme at Partick in the West End of the city of Glasgow, Scotland. It is not the history and development of the wider and internationally famous Glasgow Harbour from Glasgow Green to Clydebank which developed from the early 1800s and witnessed the birth and growth of modern shipbuilding and shipping.

== Construction ==
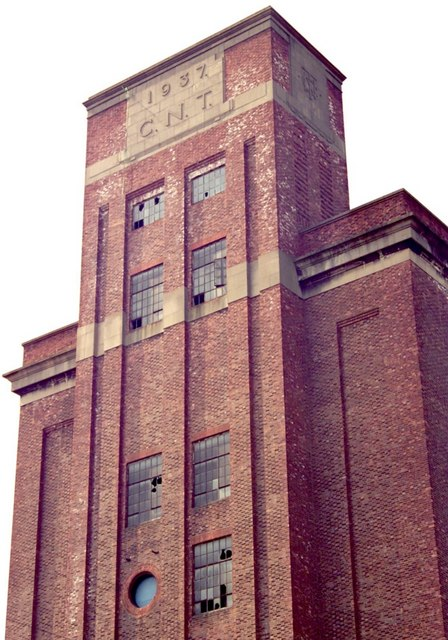
The creation of Glasgow Harbour by Clydeport (formerly the Clyde Navigation Trust, and now part of Peel Ports) required the demolition of their massive Meadowside Granary complex in 2002.

After many years of dereliction caused by the decline of shipbuilding and the migration of Glasgow's docks to the Firth of Clyde, since the mid-1980s the banks of the River Clyde at Glasgow have become a focus for property developers. Mirroring the London Docklands scheme, the old docks, and sites of old granaries, wharves and shipyards in Glasgow are being redeveloped into up-market residential apartments, office complexes and leisure facilities.

The earliest developments were the Scottish Exhibition and Conference Centre (SECC) at the former Queen's Dock in 1985, and the Glasgow Garden Festival at the former Prince's Dock in 1988, which demonstrated the potential of the riverside area as a catalyst for urban regeneration. Through the 1990s, riverside apartment buildings began to appear at Lancefield Quay on the North bank and the former General Terminus Quay on the South bank, and the Norman Foster-designed Clyde Auditorium was opened at the SECC in 1997. The former Garden Festival site is now home to the Glasgow Science Centre including Glasgow Tower (the tallest structure in the city and the spiritual successor to the Clydesdale Bank tower which was part of the Garden Festival). There has been further development at this site, with new headquarters for BBC Scotland and Scottish Television at Pacific Quay forming the cornerstone of a new "media village".

== Buildings and phases ==
Phase 1 of the Glasgow Harbour Project, by the Clyde Port Authority at the former Meadowside Granary, Yorkhill Quay and confluence of the River Kelvin in Partick, has consisted of high rise residential accommodation and the construction of a riverside walkway.

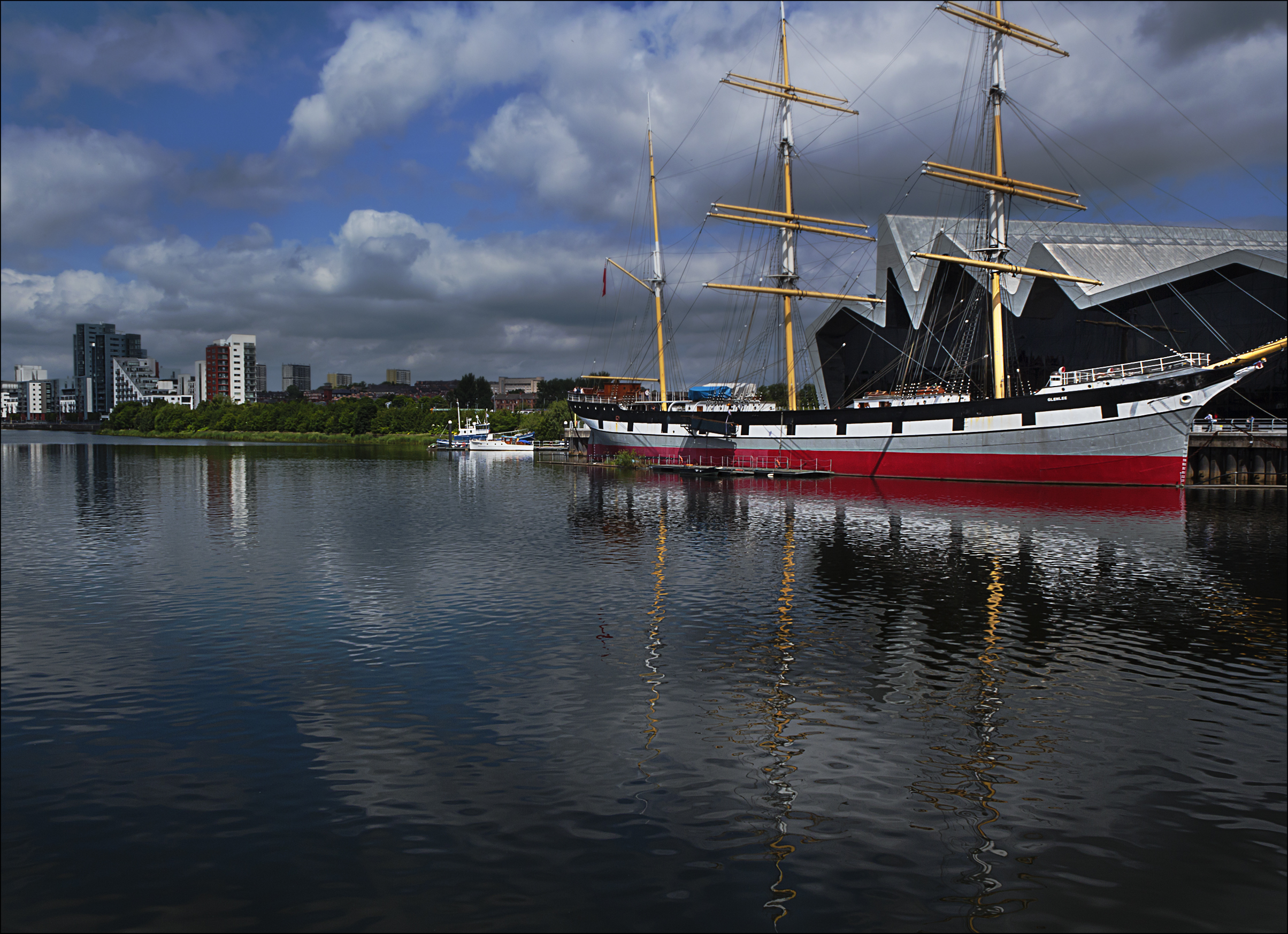
View from Govan across the River Clyde towards the Glenlee, the Riverside Museum and Glasgow Harbour apartments

The wider area now includes the Riverside Museum (the city's new Museum of Transport) adjacent to the mouth of the River Kelvin, and there are plans for large-scale commercial developments at the site.

In September 2006, the Clyde Arc road bridge opened to traffic, enhancing access to the South Bank at the SECC, while the existing Clydeside Expressway (A814) dual carriageway connects the Harbour area to Glasgow city centre and the Clyde Tunnel. Transport links will also be a key feature of Glasgow Harbour in the future, with a pre-light rail metro system planned, to be called Clyde Fastlink, which will link the area to the city centre areas, with possible interchanges to the Subway. An intermittent ferry service operates between the Riverside Museum and Govan on the south bank.

== See also ==
- Clyde Waterfront Regeneration
- Housing in Glasgow
- List of tallest buildings and structures in Glasgow
