= Port Glasgow Athletic Juniors F.C. =

Association football club in Glasgow City, Scotland

Port Glasgow Athletic Juniors
- Full name: Port Glasgow Athletic Juniors Football Club
- Nickname: Port
- Founded: 1895
- Dissolved: 1939
- Ground: Garvel Park
Home colours

Port Glasgow Athletic Juniors Football Club were a series of Scottish association football clubs which played at Junior level from 1895 to 1939.

== History ==
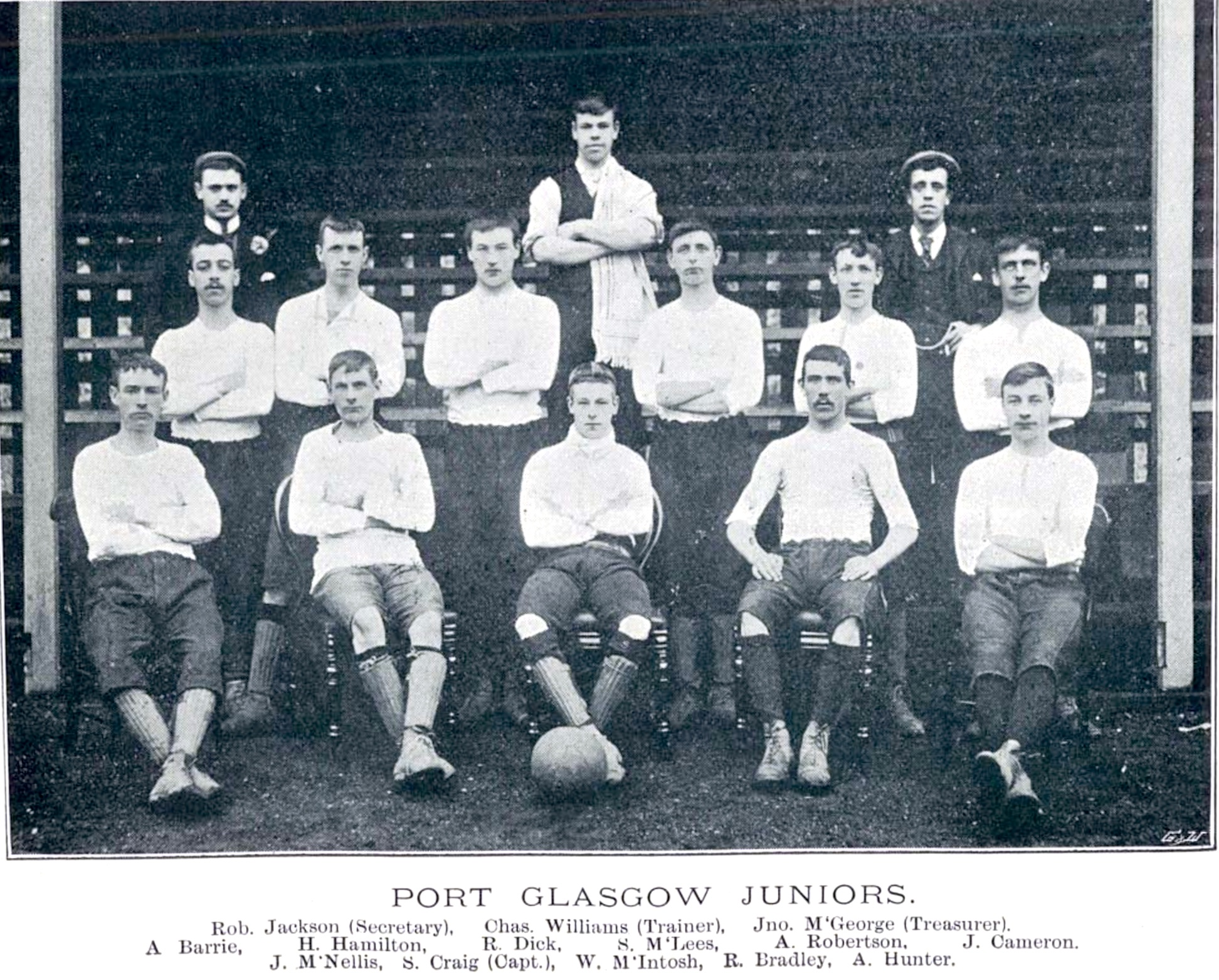
The 1897 Port Glasgow Athletic Juniors, from the Scottish Junior Portfolio

The club was the Junior section of Port Glasgow Athletic F.C. Although there are references to a PGA Juniors from 1893, this was probably the senior PGA's third XI. As was usual at the time, an amateur club, Port Glasgow Victoria, became linked to the Senior club in 1903 and was renamed PGA Juniors, this was to be the club that existed until the outbreak of World War Two in 1939.

Port Glasgow Athletic Juniors reached the final of the Scottish Junior Cup in 1914–15, going down 2–0 to Parkhead at Firhill, the winners scoring twice in the first 20 minutes and sitting back on their lead. Port however won the Scottish Junior Football League on a record five occasions – 1909–10, 1910–11, 1913–14, 1929–30 and 1937–38.

By 1931, with the parent club having long before gone under, the club was by then exclusively known as Port Glasgow Juniors. Having moved to Greenock, by the late 1930s, the club were desperate to move back to their home town, but because of a lack of available space this proved impossible. There was a scheme to redevelop the Bay area of the town, but insurance costs were prohibitive and the club never returned to Port Glasgow. The club made the decision to fold in July 1939. After the Second World War Junior football returned in the shape of Port Glasgow Juniors.

== Colours ==
The club wore white shirts, the same as the parent club.

== Grounds ==
They shared the ground at Clune Park, Port Glasgow with the Senior side Port Glasgow Athletic. When the latter disbanded in 1912 the Juniors played on at the ground until 1917. The site was then cleared and housing for the local shipyards were put up in its place. To play on, the Port shared with Greenock club Morton at Cappielow Park until 1920. They finally built a ground at Garvel Park, Greenock, at a cost of £1,000, including installations such as changing rooms. Garvel Park at the time was within an estate, but the whole area had since been built over and is now a dockyard.
