= Willie Kivlichan =

Scottish footballer

Personal information
- Full name: William Fulton Kivlichan
- Date of birth: 11 March 1886
- Place of birth: Galashiels, Scotland
- Date of death: 5 April 1937 (aged 51)
- Place of death: Dumfries, Scotland
- Positions: Outside right; centre forward

Senior career*
Years	Team	Apps	(Gls)
1902–1903	Dumfries St Joseph's		
1903–1904	Maxwelltown Juniors		
1904–1905	Dumfries		
- Glasgow University
1905–1907	Rangers	20	(7)
1907–1911	Celtic	77	(20)
1911–1914	Bradford (Park Avenue)	88	(5)
- Queen of the South

International career
1909–1910	Scottish League XI	3	(0)
- * Club domestic league appearances and goals

William Fulton Kivlichan (11 March 1886 – 5 April 1937) was a Scottish footballer, military officer and medical doctor. He played for both of the Old Firm rival clubs Rangers and Celtic in the early 1900s.

== Career ==
Born in Galashiels in the Scottish Borders, Kivlichan initially played for local clubs in the Dumfries area and signed for Rangers in 1905 via Glasgow University where he was an undergraduate in medicine; he played 24 games for the Ibrox club in two years. He was one of several players of the Catholic faith to feature for Rangers in the pre-World War I era, after which an unwritten rule was introduced at the club which persisted for several decades.

He transferred to Celtic in 1907 in an exchange deal involving fellow forward Alec Bennett and spent four seasons with the club, winning three Scottish Football League titles, a Glasgow Cup (1909) and a Scottish Cup (1911); he also represented the Scottish League XI three times while at Celtic, and came into consideration for a full cap for Scotland when he played in the Home Scots v Anglo-Scots trial match of 1910. After moving to England with Bradford (Park Avenue) he featured regularly for three seasons up to the outbreak of the First World War.

During the war, Kivlichan served as a lieutenant in the Royal Army Medical Corps, attached to the King's African Rifles. After he qualified in medicine from the University of Glasgow, Kivlichan became the Celtic team doctor. He was by the side of John Thomson as the young goalkeeper died from an injury sustained in an Old Firm match on 5 September 1931.

Kivlichan died on 5 April 1937 of heart disease at the age of 51.

== See also ==
- Played for Celtic and Rangers
