= William Semple (footballer) =

Scottish footballer

Personal information
- Date of birth: 26 November 1861
- Place of birth: Cambuslang, Scotland
- Date of death: 11 February 1940 (aged 78)
- Position: Left back

Senior career*
Years	Team	Apps	(Gls)
- Cambuslang

International career
1886	Scotland	1	(0)
- * Club domestic league appearances and goals

William Semple (26 November 1861 – 11 February 1940) was a Scottish footballer who played as a left back.

== Career ==
Born in Cambuslang, Semple played club football for Cambuslang, and made one appearance for Scotland in 1886. He captained the Scotland team on his debut.

== See also ==
- List of Scotland national football team captains
