= 1905–06 Scottish Cup =

Tournament details
- Country: Scotland

Final positions
- Champions: Heart of Midlothian
- Runners-up: Third Lanark

The 1905–06 Scottish Cup was the 33rd season of Scotland's most prestigious football knockout competition. The Cup was won by Heart of Midlothian when they beat Third Lanark 1–0.

== Calendar ==
Round	First match date	Fixtures	Clubs
First round	27 January 1906	16	32 → 16
Second round	10 February 1906	8	16 → 8
Quarter-finals	24 February 1906	4	8 → 4
Semi-finals	31 March 1906	2	4 → 2
Final	28 April 1906	1	2 → 1

== First round ==
Home team	Score	Away team
Aberdeen	3 – 0	Dunfermline
Airdrieonians	9 – 2	Maxwelltown Volunteers
Arbroath	1 – 4	Bo'ness
Arthurlie	1 – 7	Rangers
Beith	2 – 0	Inverness Thistle
Dundee	1 – 2	Celtic
Falkirk	1 – 2	Hibernian
Forfar Athletic	0 – 4	Queens Park
Heart of Midlothian	4 – 1	Nithsdale Wanderers
Kilmarnock	2 – 1	Clyde
Leith Athletic	1 – 2	Partick Thistle
Greenock Morton	4 – 3	Lochgelly United
Motherwell	2 – 3	Hamilton Academical
Port Glasgow Athletic	6 – 1	Dunblane
St Mirren	7 – 2	Black Watch
Third Lanark	5 – 0	Galston

== Second round ==
Home team	Score	Away team
Aberdeen	2 – 3	Rangers
Beith	0 – 3	Hearts
Celtic	3 – 0	Bo'ness United
Hibernian	1 – 1	Partick Thistle
Kilmarnock	2 – 2	Port Glasgow Athletic
Queen's Park	1 – 2	Airdrieonians
St Mirren	3 – 1	Greenock Morton
Third Lanark	2 – 2	Hamilton Academical

=== Second round replay ===
Home team	Score	Away team
Hamilton Academical	1 – 3	Third Lanark
Partick Thistle	1 – 1	Hibernian
Port Glasgow Athletic	0 – 0	Kilmarnock

=== Second round second replay ===
Home team	Score	Away team
Hibernian	2 – 1	Partick Thistle
Port Glasgow Athletic	0 – 0	Kilmarnock

=== Second round third replay ===
Home team	Score	Away team
Hibernian	2 – 1	Partick Thistle
Port Glasgow Athletic	1 – 0	Kilmarnock

== Quarter-final ==
Home team	Score	Away team
Airdrieonians	0 – 0	St Mirren
Celtic	1 – 2	Hearts
Hibernian	2 – 3	Third Lanark
Port Glasgow Athletic	1 – 0	Rangers

=== Quarter-final replay ===
Home team	Score	Away team
St Mirren	2 – 0	Airdrieonians

== Semi-finals ==
31 March 1906

Port Glasgow Athletic	0–2	Hearts

Clune Park

31 March 1906

St Mirren	1–1	Third Lanark

=== Replay ===
14 April 1906

Third Lanark	0–0	St Mirren

=== Second replay ===
21 April 1906

Third Lanark	1–0	St Mirren

Ibrox Stadium

== Final ==
28 April 1906

Hearts	1–0	Third Lanark
George Wilson 81'

Ibrox Stadium
Attendance: 30,000

== See also ==
- 1905–06 in Scottish football
