= Meadowside =

Scottish football ground (1897–1908)

- Location within Glasgow council area
- Location: Glasgow, Scotland
- Coordinates: 55.8682°N 4.3156°W
- Owner: Clyde Navigation Trust
- Surface: Grass
- Record attendance: 16,000

Construction
- Opened: 1897
- Closed: 1908
- Cost: £2000

Tenant
- Partick Thistle

Meadowside was a football ground in the Partick area of Glasgow, Scotland. It was the home ground of Partick Thistle from 1897 until 1908.

== History ==
Partick Thistle moved to Meadowside from Inchview Park (Whiteinch) in 1897, the year they were first promoted to Scottish Football League Division One. The ground was slowly developed and eventually included of a 750-seat grandstand on the northern side of the pitch and a running track around it. On 16 December 1899 the ground was used by Rangers for a home match against St Mirren as their new Ibrox Stadium was not ready.

The ground's probable record attendance of 16,000 was set for a Scottish Cup first round replay against Hibernian on 4 February 1905, with Thistle winning 4–2. Another crowd of 16,000 attended a Glasgow Cup first round match against Celtic on 8 September 1906. The highest league attendance at Meadowside was 11,000 for a 4–1 loss to Rangers on 3 January 1905.

In 1908 the Clyde Navigation Trust, which owned the land, opted to expand the neighbouring shipyard onto the site and Thistle were forced to move out (the Meadowside Granary was soon constructed there, and in the 21st century this was redeveloped again as the Glasgow Harbour apartment complex). Their final league match at the ground was played on 30 April 1908, a 1–1 draw with Hibernian. However, their new Firhill Park ground was not ready and Thistle spent the 1908–09 season and the first few matches of the 1909–10 season playing at other grounds, including Celtic Park, Hampden Park and Ibrox in Glasgow, Rugby Park in Kilmarnock, Shawfield in Rutherglen, Pittodrie in Aberdeen, Clune Park in Port Glasgow, Easter Road in Edinburgh and Cappielow in Greenock. The first match at Firhill was played on 18 September 1909.
