= Clune Park =

Sports venue in Inverclyde, Scotland

- Location within Inverclyde
- Location: Port Glasgow, Scotland
- Coordinates: 55.9321°N 4.6739°W
- Surface: Grass
- Record attendance: 11,000

Construction
- Opened: 1881

Tenants
- Port Glasgow Athletic (1881–1912); Port Glasgow Athletic Juniors

Clune Park was a football ground in Port Glasgow, Scotland. It was the home ground of Port Glasgow Athletic from 1881 until they folded in 1912, and also of Port Glasgow Athletic Juniors.

== History ==
Port Glasgow Athletic moved to Clune Park in 1881, and built a covered stand on the southern side of the pitch and banking around the remainder. The club were founder members of Scottish Football League Division Two in 1893, and the first SFL match was played at Clune Park on 12 August that year, with Port Glasgow Athletic beating Northern 6–1. Greenock Morton were forced to play a home match at Clune Park on 30 December 1905 when their Cappielow Park ground was closed for a month after the referee was attacked following a home defeat to Rangers earlier in the month.

The ground's record attendance was set on 10 March 1906 when 11,000 watched Port Glasgow beat Rangers 1–0 in the third round of the Scottish Cup. The highest league attendance at Clune Park came later in the year when 8,000 saw a 2–0 defeat to Rangers on 25 August. Partick Thistle used Clune Park for a home match against Port Glasgow on 20 March 1909 as their new Firhill Stadium was not ready after their move from Meadowside.

In 1911 the club resigned from the SFL. Their final SFL league match at Clune Park was played on 18 February 1911, a 1–1 draw with Leith Athletic. The club joined the Scottish Football Union, but resigned midway through the following season and folded. By this time Port Glasgow Athletic Juniors were also playing at Clune Park.

The ground closed in the 1920s and the site was used for housing; one of the roads built across the former ground was named Clune Park Street. The Clune Park Estate was demolished in 2025.
