= Port Glasgow Athletic F.C. =

Former association football club in Glasgow City, Scotland

Port-Glasgow Athletic
- Full name: Port-Glasgow Athletic Football Club
- Founded: 1878 as Broadfield (1878-1881)
- Dissolved: January 1912
- Ground: Bardrainney 1878-79, Dubbs Farm 1879-80, Devol Farm 1880-1883, Port Glasgow; Clune Park, Port Glasgow 1883-1912
- Capacity: Clune Park : 12,000
Home colours

Port-Glasgow Athletic was a football club based in Port Glasgow, Scotland. The club was formed in 1878 and originally named Broadfield before changing their name in 1881. They played in the Scottish Football League between 1893 and 1911, and were based at Clune Park. Originally the town name was spelled Port-Glasgow, with a hyphen, this style was dropped after WW2.

== History ==
Originally based at Devol Farm, Port Glasgow, the club moved to a new ground called Clune Park on the town's Glasgow Road. The Port played for one season in the Scottish Football Alliance in 1891–92 and spent 1892–93 playing cup-ties and friendlies. They rejoined the Scottish Alliance for 1893–94, but before the new season, the Alliance was more or less absorbed by the Scottish Football League as its Division Two. During their first season in the Scottish League they had a record seven points deducted for rule infringements. For a time this left the club at the foot of the Division with −2 points.

After winning Division Two in 1901–02, the Port gained election into Division One. Despite struggling at the top level due to operating as an amateur club for most of the time, the club managed to stay in the division for eight years.

In the Scottish Cup, they reached the semi-finals in 1898–99 and 1905–06. On the latter occasion they knocked out Rangers in the quarter-finals. They also competed often in the Glasgow Cup. Their most well-known player was probably Gladstone Hamilton, the only player to be capped by Scotland while with the club. He played on the left wing for Scotland in the 1–0 win over Ireland in the 1906 British Home Championship. Two of his brothers were also Scottish internationalists though they played for Queen's Park. Gladstone later moved to England to join Brentford.

The club was relegated in 1909–10 and finished eighth in the 1910–11 Division Two table. Due to their precarious financial standing the club chose not seek re-election to membership of the Scottish League. After leaving the Scottish Football League, the club surprisingly joined the Scottish Football Union, but ceased operations as a senior side midway through the season. Apparently many of the players who were amateurs joined Port Glasgow Athletic Juniors. Although sharing the name and ground with the Senior organisation, this club had a semi-autonomous existence competing as the club's third XI in Junior competitions since in the 1890s.

== Nickname and colours ==
The club was nicknamed "The Undertakers" – the reasons for this are somewhat confused. One explanation is the involvement of a local funeral director in the founding of the initial side or, more likely, they were known as the Undertakers because they originally played in black shirts, changing to white shirts with navy shorts and socks from 1882.

== Honours ==
- Scottish Football League
  - Division Two champions 1901–02
- Scottish Qualifying Cup
  - Winners: 1897–98
- Renfrewshire FA Cup
  - Winners: 1884–85, 1894–95, 1895–96, 1899–1900, 1908–09
- West of Scotland League
  - Champions: 1901–02

== See also ==
- Category:Port Glasgow Athletic F.C. players
