= Celtic F.C. and World War I =

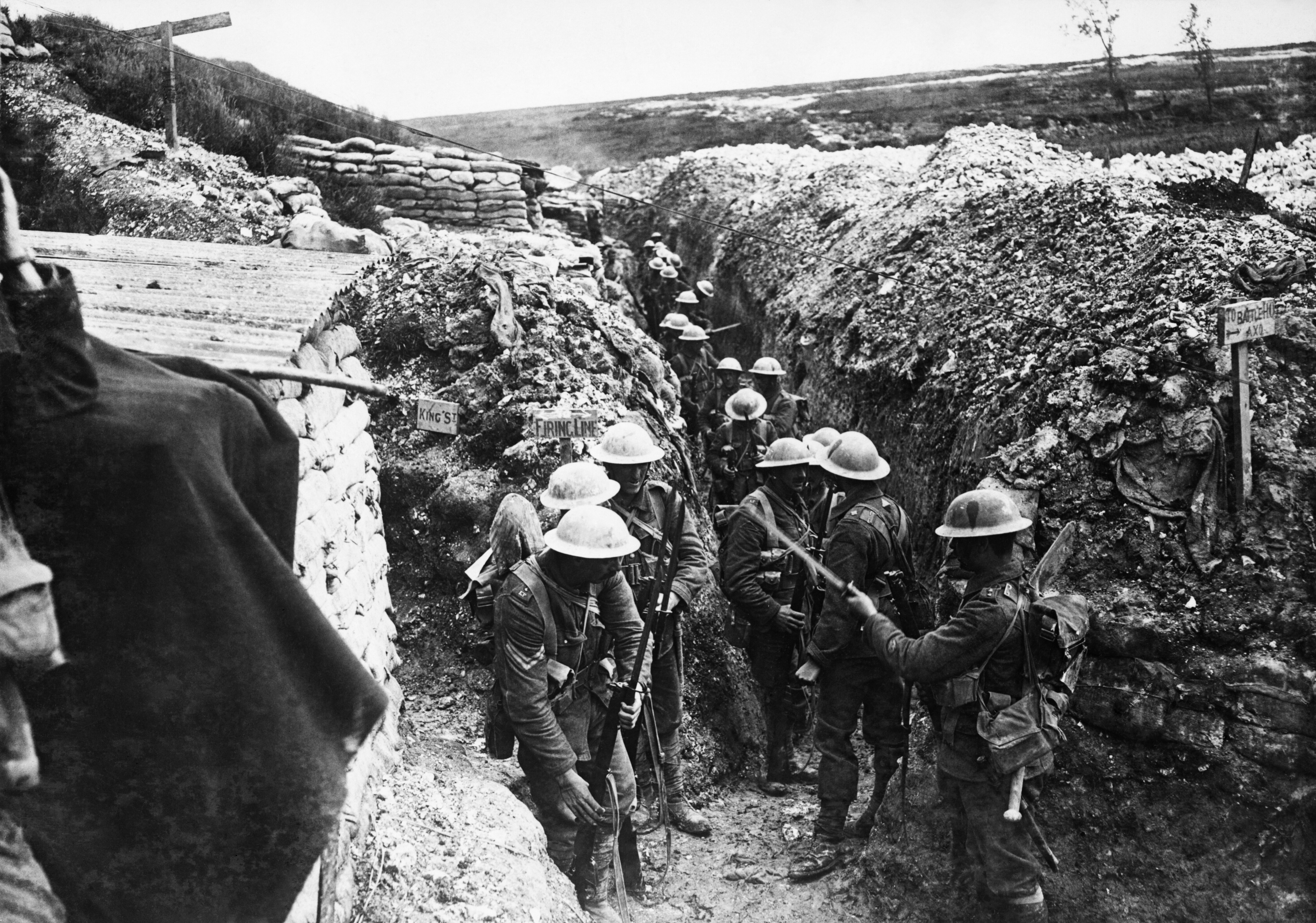
1st Lancashire Fusiliers, in communication trench near Beaumont Hamel, Somme, 1916. Photo by Ernest Brooks.

Over 50 contracted and former Celtic F.C. players fought in World War I, seven of whom died. Of those that fought, William Angus was awarded the Victoria Cross for bravery in battle.

== Background ==
In the early 20th Century Celtic F.C. was already a successful club having won 10 Scottish League Championships and 8 Scottish Cups in their 26-year history (by 1914). Celtic won the league four times in a row during World War I. During this run of league championships, Celtic went 62 matches unbeaten from 20 November 1915 until 14 April 1917, a record in British football that stood for a century. However, football was not as important due to the War effort; attendances fell, player's salaries were reduced and there was increased pressure to complete the fixture list. On one occasion in 1916, during their 62 match unbeaten run, Celtic had to play two matches on the same day against Raith Rovers and Motherwell, and won both 6–0 and 3–1 respectively. Recruitment drives were also held at football matches and on one occasion an exhibition of trench warfare was held at Celtic Park.

Over 50 contracted and former Celtic players served in the war. Of the 908,371 British and Commonwealth soldiers who died in the fighting, six were former Celtic players whilst one was still a contracted player at the club. The fallen were Patrick Slavin, Leigh Richmond Roose, Donnie McLeod, Archie McMillan, Bob Craig, John McLaughlin and Peter Johnstone. Roose and Slavin died in the Battle of the Somme (1916), four others died in 1917 and Craig died in 1918.

== The men who died ==
Roose pictured in a Stoke City team photograph c.1904. From Association Football and the Men Who Made It (1906).

=== Leigh Roose ===
Roose was a Welsh goalkeeper who played a trial match for Celtic in 1910. He had 24 caps for Wales and a Doctorate in Bacteriology before he joined the 9th Royal Fusiliers in 1914. He rose to the rank of Lance Corporal and was awarded the Military Medal before his death on 7 October 1916 between the hours of 1.45pm and 9.00pm in the Battle for Montauban. His regiment was sent to attack the enemy line and it is believed that he died as a result of heavy machine gun fire and shelling when his regiment came under attack (he is recorded as missing on the Thiepval Memorial). On that day it is recorded 25 died, 165 missing and 132 wounded.

=== Patrick Slavin ===
Slavin was the second former player to die. He rose to the rank of Sergeant and was with the 2nd Battalion Royal Scots and died 13 November 1916, in the 2nd Battle for the village of Serre. The day he died it was reported that there was thick fog by 5 am and that the enemy's barbed wire was not cut, he is reported to have been shot dead after "going over the top", that day 23 died, 84 missing and 177 wounded.

=== John McLaughlin ===
McLaughlin's records are scant which is an indication that he may never have made a first team appearance for Celtic. However, it is known that he played for Mossend Hibs and Renton. He held the rank of private and was in the 11th Battalion of the Highland Light Infantry. He was injured on 23 April 1917 when his battalion came under fire at the Battle of Calvary Farm at Monchy Le Preux which is north of Arras. He did not survive his wounds and died on 10 May 1917.

=== Peter Johnstone ===
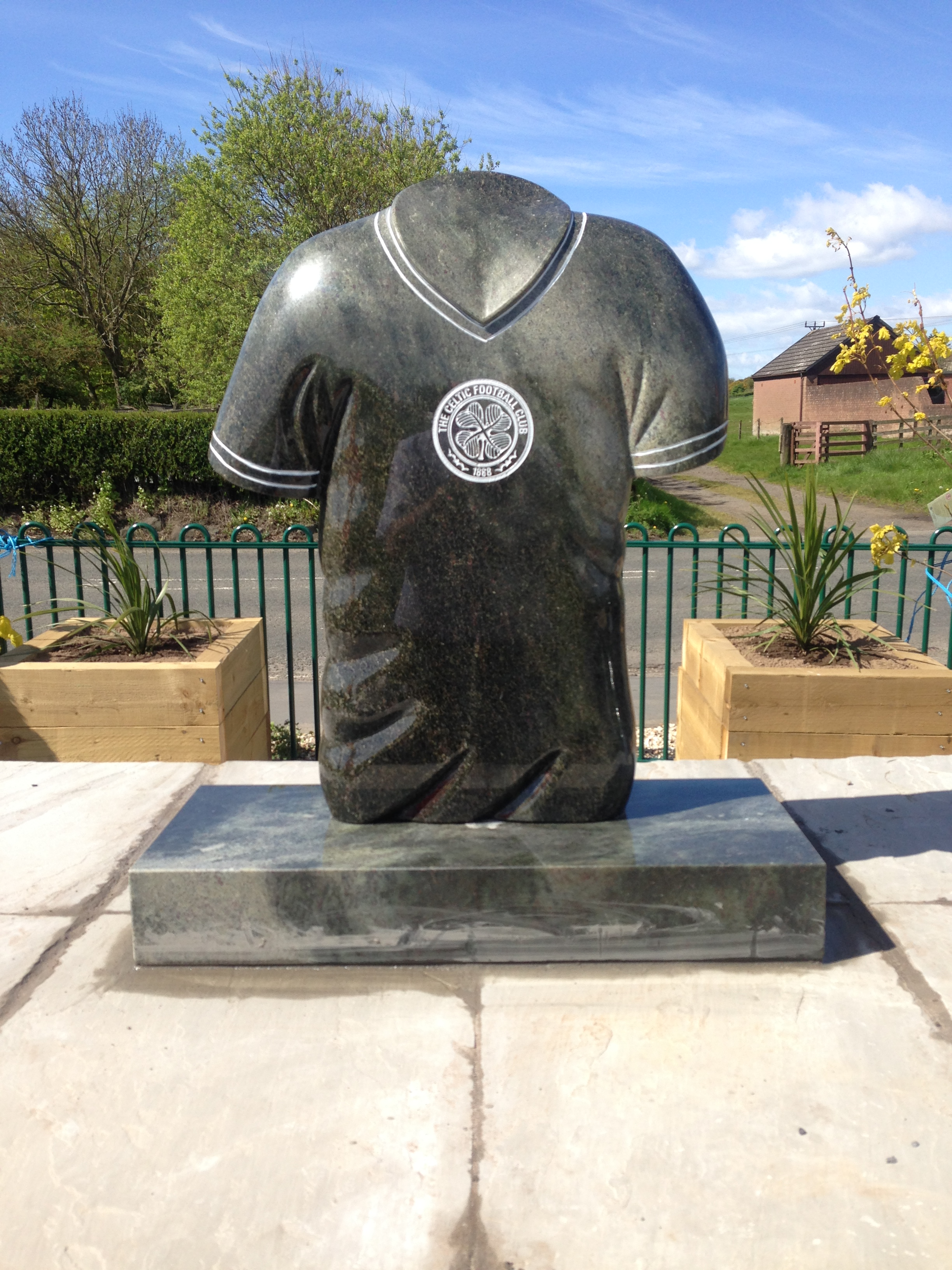
Memorial to Peter Johnstone in Glencraig, Fife

Peter Johnstone was the only contracted Celtic player to give his life in the war – a pre-war club legend who had played for Celtic 223 times and won the league four times under manager Willie Maley. Peter joined the 6th Battalion of the Seaforth Highlanders. He died in May 1917, when his regiment were told to capture a chemical factory as part of the Battle of Arras. In the second day of the battle it was reported 43 died, 26 missing and 51 wounded; although he among the missing, rumours of his death spread around Glasgow and were confirmed on 6 June 1917. His name is engraved on the Arras Memorial.

=== Archie McMillan ===
Archie McMillan was an outside left who failed to make a competitive appearance for Celtic. He held the rank of Private and was in the 1st/7th Argyll and Sutherland Highlanders. From 21 to 23 November 1917, his regiment was involved in heavy fighting in the Battle of Cambrai. Their orders were to capture the village of Fontaine-Notre-Dame, Aisne and although they were successful he was shot dead and was among the 9 dead, 22 missing and 128 wounded. He is buried in a British war cemetery in Manancourt.

=== Donald McLeod ===
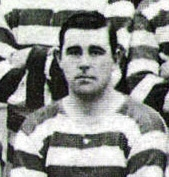

Donald "Donnie" McLeod was a full back who played 155 times for Celtic between 1902 and 1908. He subsequently moved to Middlesbrough and was playing for them when he joined the army. He was a gunner in the 466th Battery of the 65th Royal Field Artillery. It is known that he died of his injuries on 6 October 1917 the cause of them is unknown. However it is most certain that he died in Belgium and was involved (or died) in the Battle of Passchendaele. McLeod is buried in Dozingham Military Cemetery, Westvleteren, Belgium, Plot 5, Row G, Grave 7.

=== Bob Craig ===
Bob Craig left Celtic in 1909, having spent three seasons at the club and was the final former Celtic player to die in the war. He was a full-back and played 13 times for the club. He was a private in the 5th Battalion of the South Wales Borderers and died on 19 April 1918. He died of his wounds from 11/04/1918 when the enemy re-captured the town of Mesen in Belgium. He is buried in Boulogne Eastern Cemetery, plot 9, row A, grave 3.

== William Angus VC ==
In 1914 William Angus was captain of Wishaw Thistle. Details of his time at Celtic remain uncertain, but he was contracted to the club for a short spell before the war, making a couple of appearances for the reserve team. He left the club at some point in season 1913/14 and returned to his primary occupation as a miner in Carluke. He was also a Territorial soldier in the local battalion of the Highland Light Infantry. In 1914 his unit was mobilized and his entire company was sent as a reinforcement draft to the 8th Royal Scots. He crossed to France later that year and in June 1915, near Givenchy, he was awarded the Victoria Cross for bravery and valour in rescuing Lt James Martin who had fallen wounded a few feet from the German line. Angus was wounded 40 times in the process and lost an eye. When he came home to Scotland he was given a hero's welcome and was always a guest of honour in major football matches. He also became the president of Carluke Rovers F.C. and held that position until his death.

== Charity ==
Despite not being actively involved in the conflict, the people at home made valuable contributions to the war effort. In 1918 Celtic won the Navy and Army War Fund Shield, a friendly tournament that Celtic and a few other teams agreed to take part as a fundraising event to give money to footballers and their families who fought in the war.

== See also ==
- History of Celtic F.C.
- Association football during World War I
