= History of Celtic F.C. (1887–1994) =

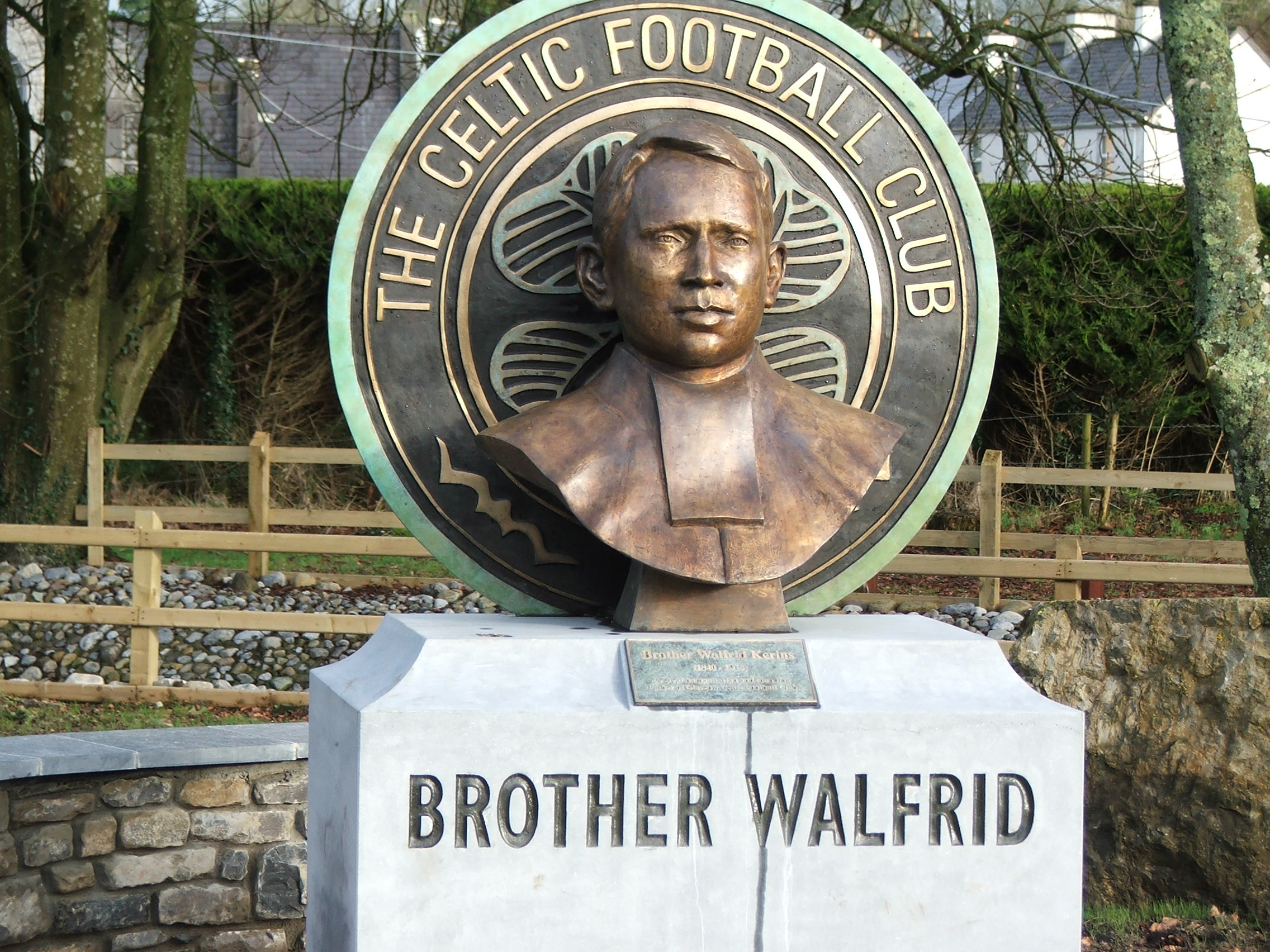
Commemorative sculpture of Brother Walfrid, founder of Celtic Football Club

Celtic Football Club was constituted in 1888 with the purpose of creating a club for Irish Immigrants. Celtic play home games at Celtic Park, having moved there from their original ground in 1892. From 1887-1994, Celtic quickly established itself as a dominant force in Scottish football, winning six successive league titles during the first decade of the 20th century. A fierce rivalry developed with Rangers, and the two clubs became known as the Old Firm.

Under manager Jock Stein, in 1967 Celtic became the first British team to win the European Cup, which had previously been the preserve of Italian, Portuguese and Spanish clubs. Celtic is one of only two clubs to have won the trophy with a team composed entirely of players from the club's home country; all of the players in the side were born within 30 miles of Celtic Park in Glasgow.

Celtic won nine successive league titles from 1966–1974. The club continued to enjoy domestic success throughout the 70s and 80s, despite the rise of the so-called New Firm of Aberdeen and Dundee United. Celtic won the league and cup double in 1988, their Centenary Year.

The team's fortunes went into decline in the early 1990s, with the family dynasties that had run Celtic since its formation struggling to cope with the increasing commercialisation of football. However Celtic have remained the same club since 1888 until 1994. In 1994 the company became a public limited company.

== Early years (1887–1897) ==
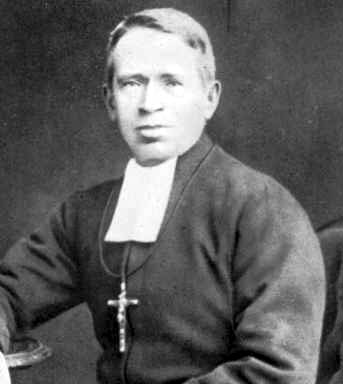
Brother Walfrid, founder of Celtic F.C.

Celtic Football Club was formally constituted at a meeting in St. Mary's church hall in East Rose Street (now Forbes Street), Calton, Glasgow, by Irish Marist Brother Walfrid on 6 November 1887, with the purpose of alleviating poverty in the East End of Glasgow by raising money for the charity Walfrid had instituted, the Poor Children's Dinner Table. Walfrid's move to establish the club as a means of fund-raising was largely inspired by the example of Hibernian who were formed out of the immigrant Irish population a few years earlier in Edinburgh. Walfrid's own suggestion of the name 'Celtic' (still pronounced Seltik, the standard pronunciation in the 19th century), was intended to reflect the club's Irish and Scottish roots, and was adopted at the same meeting. The club has the official nickname, "The Bhoys". However, according to the Celtic press office, the newly established club was known to many as "the bold boys". A postcard from the early 20th century that pictured the team, and read "The Bould Bhoys", is the first known example of the unique spelling. The extra 'h' imitates the spelling system of Gaelic, where the letter B is often accompanied by the letter H.

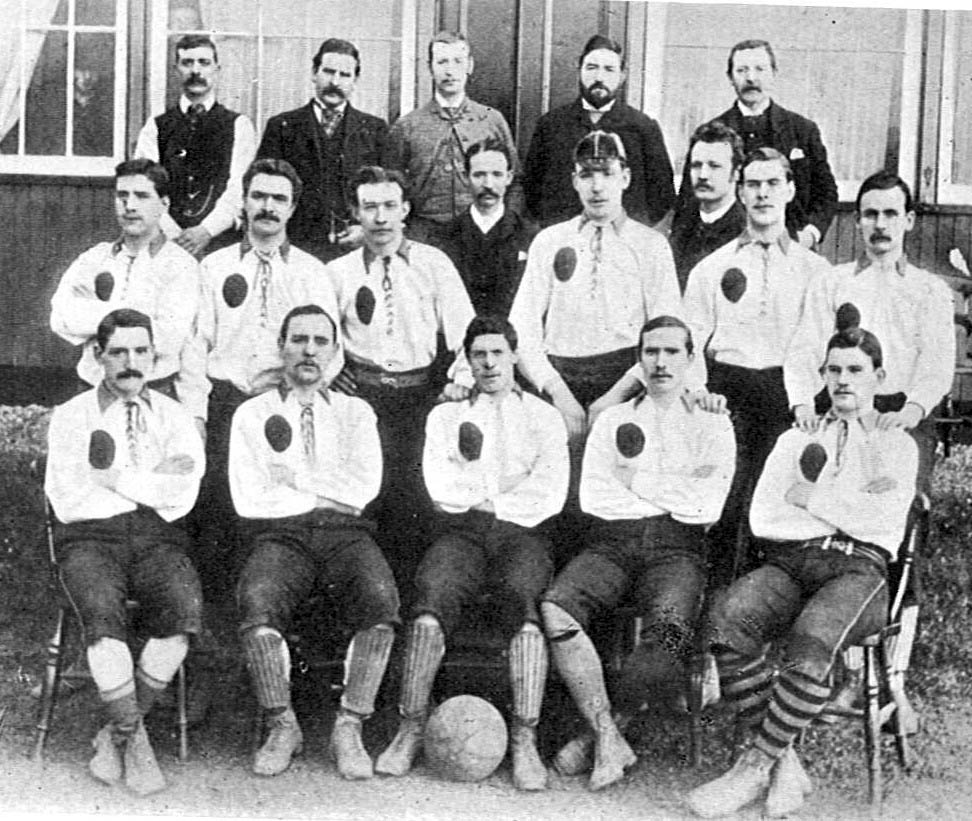
A team photo from the early days of the club in 1888, before the adoption of the now-famous hooped jerseys

On 28 May 1888, Celtic played their first official match against Rangers and won 5–2 in what was described as a "friendly encounter". Neil McCallum scored Celtic's first ever goal. The derby between the two rivals became inescapably linked with the slogan: the Old Firm. The actual origins of the term are unclear; some believe it relates to a newspaper comment made that the players in their first meeting got on so well that they appeared to be "old firm friends", whilst others believe it to be a cynical observation of the commercial benefits that the two clubs enjoyed as their rivalry grew.

Celtic's first kit consisted of a white shirt with a green collar, black shorts, and emerald green socks. The original club crest was a simple green cross on a red oval background. In 1889, the club adopted a strip of white and green vertical stripes before finally taking up the now famous green and white hoops in 1903.

While Brother Walfrid had only charitable motives for the club, others saw huge financial potential. John Glass, a Scottish builder with Donegal family connections and Pat Welsh, a tailor who had left Ireland 20 years previously, observed the coming of professionalism in England in 1885 and correctly assumed that Scotland would follow. In August 1888, without the knowledge of Brother Walfrid or the club committee, Glass signed eight of Hibs’ best players, having offered them cash inducements. The consequences for Hibernian were catastrophic due to the loss of so many players. They went into immediate decline and went out business by the end of the season, although quickly reformed and managed to re-establish themselves in Scottish football.

In 1889, Celtic reached the final of the Scottish Cup, this was their first season in the competition, but lost 2–1 to Third Lanark in the final. They also reached the final of the local Glasgow North Eastern Cup and beat Cowlairs 6–1 in the final. Celtic again reached the final of the Scottish Cup in 1892, but this time were victorious after defeating Queen's Park 5–1 in the final which was held at Rangers' stadium, Ibrox Park. Sandy McMahon and John Campbell both scored twice in the game, helping Celtic win their first major honour. Several months later the club moved to its new ground, Celtic Park, and in the following season won the Scottish Football League for the first ever time. On 26 October 1895, Celtic set the League record for the highest home score when they beat Dundee 11–0.

== Willie Maley years (1897–1940) ==
In 1897, the club became a Private limited company and Willie Maley was appointed as the first 'secretary-manager'. Having been a club that initially relied on buying in experienced players, Maley instead concentrated on developing young talent mainly from the Junior ranks. This proved a success as Celtic went on to dominate Scottish football in the first decade of the 20th century, winning the Scottish League Championship six times in a row between 1905 and 1910. In both 1907 and 1908 Celtic also won the Scottish Cup, this was the first time a Scottish club had ever won the Double. During this time, players such as Alec McNair, Jimmy Quinn, 'Sunny' Jim Young, Peter Somers, Alec Bennett, Davie Hamilton, Jimmy McMenemy and goalkeeper Davey Adams provided the backbone of Celtic's team.

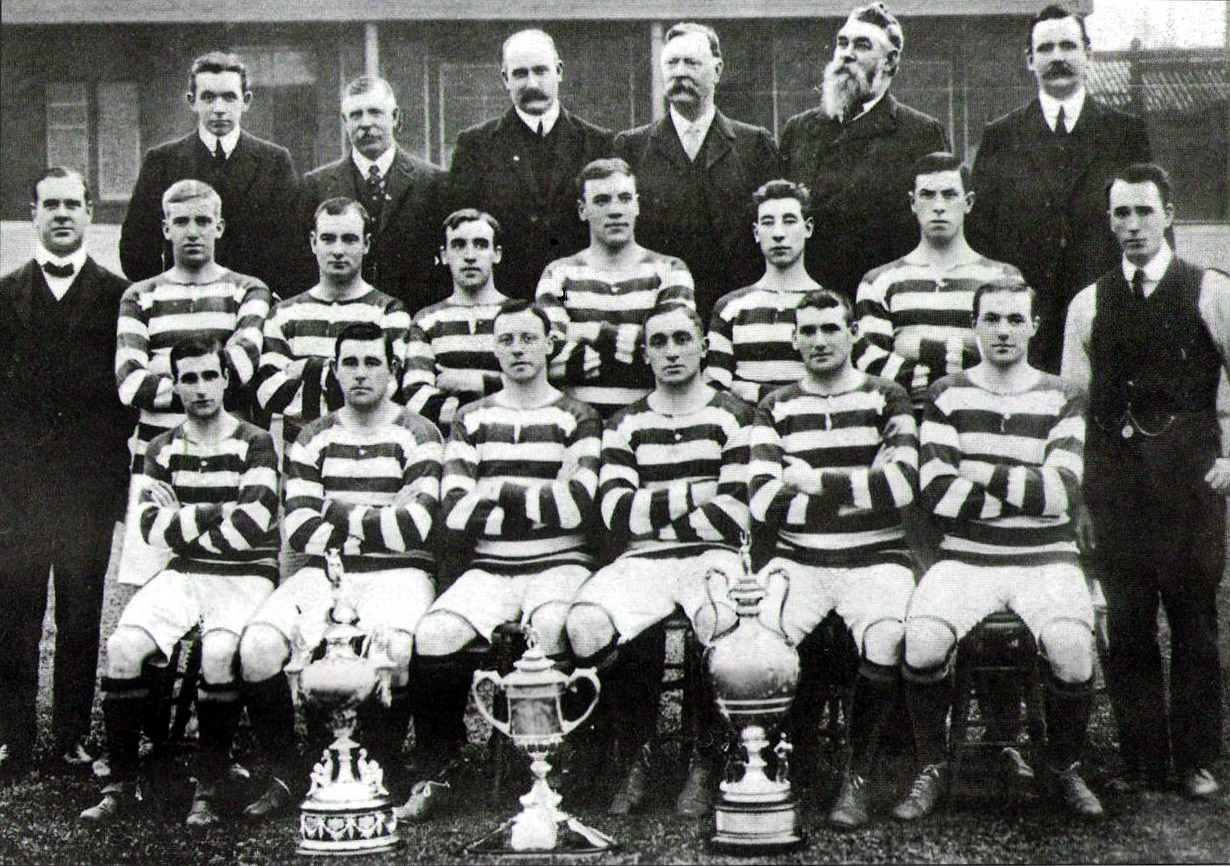
The Celtic side of 1908 were Scottish League champions and winners of the Glasgow Merchants Charity Cup, Scottish Cup and Glasgow Cup

The turn of the decade saw several key players either retire or leave Celtic for other clubs. This coincided with a slight decline in the club's fortunes as Rangers racked up three consecutive league titles between 1911 and 1913. Celtic however continued to enjoy success in the Scottish Cup, with Cup Final wins over Hamilton in 1911, Clyde in 1912 and Hibernian in 1914. 'Sunny' Jim Young was at the peak of his powers and captain of the side, whilst the slightly built Patsy Gallacher belied his frail appearance with exhilarating skill on the wing. With the emergence of Gallacher along with others such as Peter Johnstone and Andy McAtee complementing long-time stalwarts such as Young, McNair and McMenemy, Celtic regained the League Championship at the end of April 1914 to complete their third League and Cup Double.

The Ferencváros Vase (also known as The Budapest Cup) was won by Celtic on a European tour in 1914. Celtic played Burnley in Budapest as Ferencváros had agreed to award a trophy to the winner. However, the match was a bad tempered affair and ended in a draw, with both teams refusing to play extra time. A replay couldn't be organised in Budapest as Celtic were travelling back to Glasgow. After winning the coin toss to play the game at home, Burnley played host to Celtic. The visitors won 2–0 and part of the gate money was sent to the Hungarian Charity Fund, however Celtic were not presented with the trophy, which had been sold to raise funds for the war effort. Seventy four years later, in 1988, Celtic were celebrating their centenary and Ferencváros remembered they 'owed' the club a trophy. In the absence of the original trophy they brought a decorative white porcelain vase, fashioned in the traditional shape of a football cup, to Glasgow. It was presented at Celtic's centenary championship winning match against Dundee in April 1988.

During World War I, Celtic won the league four times in a row. During this run of league championships, Celtic went 62 matches unbeaten from 20 November 1915 until 14 April 1917, a record in British football that stood for 100 years, until broken by Celtic themselves in November 2017. However, Celtic's time during World War I was mixed, although they enjoyed great success on the pitch. Football was not as important; attendances fell, player's salaries were reduced and there was increased pressure to complete the fixture list. On one occasion in 1916, during their 62 match unbeaten run, Celtic had to play two matches on the same day against Raith Rovers and Motherwell, and won both 6–0 and 3–1 respectively. Recruitment drives were also held at football matches and on one occasion an exhibition of trench warfare was held at Celtic Park. Several Celtic players also fought during the war; reserve player William Angus won the Victoria Cross for his bravery in the field and fan-favourite Peter Johnstone, who had made over 200 appearances for Celtic, died at the Battle of Arras in 1917.

The period during the war saw the death of Brother Walfrid, who died on 17 April 1915 at 74 years of age. He was buried in a Marist graveyard in Dumfries. Maley referred to Brother Walfrid's death in his annual report to shareholders, stating he had been "... the last of the leading founders of the Celtic club.." and that his work for Celtic had been "a labour of love".

After the Great War, and into the 1920s, Rangers took over from Celtic as the dominant force in Scottish football. Rangers won 8 league titles to Celtic's 2 during the 1920s. Celtic, however, continued to find success in the Scottish Cup, winning it three times in the 20s. Celtic's Scottish Cup win in 1925 proved to be particularly memorable. The semi-final in front of a crowd of over 100,000 at Hampden saw Celtic beat Rangers 5–0. Celtic met Dundee in the final on 11 April 1925. With the match nearing full-time and Dundee leading 1–0, Patsy Gallacher dribbled forward towards the Dundee goal. A Dundee defender tackled Gallacher as he neared the goalmouth, Gallacher stumbled but managed to somersault with the ball gripped between his feet, over the goal-line and into the back of the net. Willie Maley commented afterwards that Gallacher's goal was "one of these incidents that had to be seen to be appreciated." Celtic went on to score another goal and won 2–1.

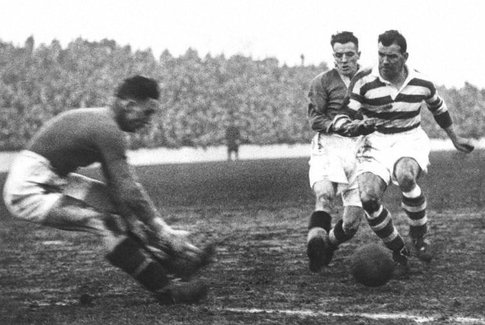
Jimmy McGrory (right) in action for Celtic during the 1930s. He is the record goal-scorer in British football, with a career total of 550 goals

The mid-1920s saw the emergence of Jimmy McGrory as one of the most prolific goalscorers in Scottish football history. Over a sixteen-year playing career, he scored 550 goals (including 16 goals for Clydebank during a season on loan in 1923–24), a British goal-scoring record to this day. His 57 League and Cup goals in season 1926–27 remains a record at Celtic. In January 1928, McGrory set the League record for most league goals in a match, when he scored eight of Celtic's goals in a 9–0 win over Dunfermline. In 1928 Arsenal made strenuous attempts to sign McGrory, offering both player and club huge (for the time) amounts of money. Celtic were more than willing to sell, but McGrory did not want to leave Celtic and thus remained. Later McGrory quipped, "McGrory of Arsenal just never sounded as good as McGrory of Celtic".

In September 1931 the club was struck by tragedy when goalkeeper John Thomson was accidentally killed during an Old Firm encounter. Thomson dived in bravely at the feet of Rangers player Sam English, suffering a skull fracture and died in hospital that evening. Thomson was only 22 years old but had amassed over 200 competitive appearances for Celtic since making his first-team debut as an 18-year-old in 1927. In his ultimately short career, the young goalkeeper had gained the respect and admiration of his colleagues and opponents, and was considered to be one of the finest 'keepers in the country. He was later referred to as the 'Prince of Goalkeepers' in Hugh Taylor's book The Masters of Scottish Football (1967), a label which has since stuck. An estimated 30,000 mourners attended Thomson's funeral at Cardenden in Fife. Sam English, himself a young rising star in Scottish football, was completely blameless for the accident but moved to England a year later before finally retiring in 1938, still aged only 28. English referred to his football career after Thomson's death as "seven years of joyless sport".

Maley's era also saw the arrival of the first player from the Indian sub-continent player at a major European club when he signed Mohammed Abdul Salim in 1936. Despite playing in his bare feet, Salim scored one goal in a 5–1 win over Hamilton Accies and created three goals for other Celtic players in a 7–1 win over Galston. Salim was praised by the media for his performances in the two games (both friendlies) he played for Celtic. He thus became the first player from the Indian sub-continent to play for a European club. After a few months in Scotland, and without making any competitive appearances, Salim returned to India where he saw out the remainder of his football career.

Celtic's performances improved in the mid-1930s with the emergence of winger Jimmy Delaney and forwards Johnny Crum, Willie Buchan and John Divers complementing the now veteran Jimmy McGrory. Celtic won the league title in 1936, their first championship since 1926, and enjoyed away wins at Ibrox and Motherwell's Fir Park for the first time since 1921 and 1926 respectively. McGrory scored a club record 50 league goals that season. The following year Celtic played Aberdeen in the 1937 Scottish Cup Final, which was watched by a crowd of 146,433 at Hampden Park. Celtic won 2–1 and the attendance remains a record for a club match in Europe. Season 1937–38 was Celtic's golden jubilee season. Celtic's traditional New Year league fixture against Rangers was played on 1 January 1938 at Celtic Park in front of 83,500 supporters, a record attendance at the ground. Celtic went on to win 3–0, and was their first New Year derby win in 10 years. The club won their 19th league title that season, clinching it on 23 April 1938 with a 3–1 win over St Mirren. On 10 June 1938, Celtic defeated Everton of England 1–0 at Ibrox Park to claim the Empire Exhibition Trophy; Johnny Crum scoring the decisive goal.

In January 1940, Willie Maley's retirement was announced. He was 71 years old and had served the club in varying roles for nearly 52 years, initially as a player and then as secretary-manager.

== World War II (1939–1945) ==
Former player Jimmy McStay became manager of the club in February 1940. He spent over five years in this role, although due to the Second World War no official competitive league football took place during this time. Many footballers signed up to fight in the war and as a result many teams were depleted, and fielded guest players instead. The Scottish Football League and Scottish Cup were suspended and in their place regional league competitions were set up.

Celtic did not do particularly well during the war years, not helped by their reluctance to field guest players. They did manage to win the Glasgow Cup in 1941 and the Glasgow Charity Cup in 1943. Several very promising young players did emerge at Celtic during the war; goalkeeper Willie Miller, forward John McPhail and right-half Bobby Evans.

The Victory in Europe Cup was a one-off football tournament won by Celtic on 9 May 1945. To celebrate Victory in Europe Day in 1945, the Glasgow Charity Cup committee presented the Victory in Europe Cup to be awarded to the winners of a charity cup final. Rangers were invited to participate but declined as they had a forthcoming cup tie against Motherwell. This allowed Queen's Park to step in and play Celtic. The game finished 0–0 and Celtic won only by the margin of a corner kick.

In July 1945, McStay was asked by the Celtic Board to resign, which he did reluctantly. He did however later return to Celtic to work as chief scout.

== Jimmy McGrory years (1945–1965) ==
Ex-player Jimmy McGrory returned to Celtic in the summer of 1945 as manager. A further significant change occurred in the Boardroom with the death in 1947 of Celtic chairman Tom White who had been in failing health for several years. Robert Kelly, who had been a director at the club since 1931 and was a stockbroker by profession, became the new Chairman of Celtic in March 1947. For the next 18 years, Kelly would be the dominant personality at Celtic Park; imposing his will in the running of the club at all levels and having direct involvement in team selection, to the extent that many queried how much say McGrory really had in team matters.

Celtic toiled for the first few post-war years under McGrory, and narrowly avoided relegation in 1948. In response, Celtic appointed Jimmy Hogan during the summer as a coach. He had previously worked throughout Europe, notably Hungary, and spent six years as the English FA's coach. Hogan only spent two years at Parkhead but is credited with the improvement in Celtic's football in the early 1950s, and his coaching ideas are also believed to have later inspired Jock Stein.

In April 1951, a John McPhail goal saw Celtic defeat Motherwell 1–0 in the Scottish Cup Final for the club's first major trophy since the war. Two years later, Celtic defeated Arsenal, Manchester United and Hibernian to win the Coronation Cup, a one-off tournament held in May 1953 to commemorate the coronation of Elizabeth II.

In 1954, Celtic won their first league and cup double for forty years, and their first league title since 1938. Centre-half Jock Stein, a low-key signing from Llanelli, had been appointed stand-in captain in 1952 due to injury to Sean Fallon. Stein kept his position as team captain even after Fallon's return from injury, and his presence imposed a sense of purpose within the team that had previously been lacking. Celtic finished five points ahead of Hearts in the league and had the best defensive record in the division (only 29 goals conceded). The Scottish Cup Final was contested between Celtic and Aberdeen. A keenly contested match was won by a Sean Fallon goal after excellent play from Willie Fernie.

The 1950s saw several players emerge as mainstays in the Celtic side, Bobby Evans, Bertie Peacock, Bobby Collins and perhaps most memorably, Charlie Tully. Tully was a charismatic performer who combined audacious dribbling with outright showboating and razor sharp wit. In a Scottish Cup tie in 1953 at Falkirk, Tully scored direct from a corner. The 'goal' was disallowed by the referee as the ball had been placed slightly outwith the arc. Tully re-took the corner and swung the ball directly into the net again. Tully became hugely popular with the Celtic support, and 'Tullymania' resulted in Glasgow cafes selling 'Tully ice cream', bars serving 'Tully cocktails' and drapers producing 'Tully ties'.

Bobby Collins in contrast to Tully was a hard uncompromising player but nevertheless a very creative midfielder. He made his debut at 18 years old and became a fixture in the Celtic side of the 1950s, playing in the Scottish Cup winning team of 1951, League Championship side of 1953–54 and League Cup winning sides of 1956 and 1957. Collins was a very popular figure with the Celtic support who nicknamed the 5'3" midfielder "The Wee Barra". He scored 116 goals in 320 appearances for Celtic in major competitions. However, more than most he seemed to suffer from the club's eccentric team selections of that time; being inexplicably dropped from the 1954 Cup Final against Aberdeen (Celtic won 2–1) and again a year later in the Cup Final replay against lowly Clyde, with the unfancied underdogs winning 1–0 in one of Scotland's more surprising cup final results.

On 19 October 1957, Celtic trounced Rangers a record 7–1 in the final of the Scottish League Cup at Hampden Park in Glasgow, retaining the trophy they had won for only the first time the previous year. The scoreline remains a record win in a British domestic cup final. The victory is still sung of by fans – Hampden in the sun to the tune of the Harry Belafonte song Island in the Sun. Billy McPhail grabbed a hat-trick after Sammy Wilson and Neilly Mochan had the Celts 2–0 up at the break. Mochan then added to his tally in the second period before Willie Fernie slotted away a penalty right at the end.

The years that followed saw Celtic struggle and, despite the emergence of hugely promising players such as Billy McNeill, Paddy Crerand, Bertie Auld and Jimmy Johnstone, Celtic won no more trophies under McGrory.

Within the space of just over a year in the late 1950s, both Jock Stein and Sean Fallon had to retire from playing due to injury. Both men became involved in the coaching of the reserve side, with Stein eventually leaving Celtic to become manager of Dunfermline Athletic in 1960. Fallon remained at Celtic and became Chief Coach working under McGrory. Other key players left Celtic around this time as well; John McPhail retired in 1956, Bobby Collins was sold to Everton in 1958, Charlie Tully returned to Ireland in 1959 and Bobby Evans joined Chelsea in 1960.

In the post-war period numbered shirts slowly came into use throughout Scotland, before becoming compulsory in 1960. By this time Celtic were the last club in Britain to adopt the use of numbers on the team strip to identify players. The traditionalist and idealistic Celtic chairman, Robert Kelly, baulked at the prospect of the famous green and white hoops being disfigured, and as such Celtic wore their numbers on the players shorts.

The early 1960s saw Celtic make their first forays into European club competition. Celtic's third place in the league the previous season saw them qualify for the Inter-Cities Fairs Cup in 1962. Celtic were drawn against Spanish side Valencia in the first round. The tie, as with most European ties, was played over two games at each team's home ground. The first 'leg' in Spain saw Celtic beaten 4–2, although a modicum of pride was restored in the return leg in Glasgow which finished 2–2.

The following season, 1963–64, saw Celtic return to European competition, this time in the European Cup Winners Cup. Celtic belied their recent mediocre domestic achievements in Scotland by reaching the semi-final of the tournament, eliminating FC Basel, Dinamo Zagreb and Slovan Bratislava on the way. The first leg of the semi-final against MTK Budapest took place at Celtic Park, and goals from Jimmy Johnstone and Stevie Chalmers gave Celtic an impressive 3–0 win. Celtic were defeated 4–0 in the return leg in Hungary and go out on aggregate.

In Scotland, Celtic continued to struggle. By January 1965 Celtic were once again out of contention for the league and had just been beaten in the New Year game by Rangers, drawn with Clyde and lost to Dundee United. The Daily Mail on 12 January 1965 commented on Celtic, "They are being left behind by provincial clubs with a fraction of their resources. They are being left so far behind by Rangers that it is no longer a race." On that same day, the Celtic Board held a special meeting to discuss changes to the management.

== Jock Stein (1965–1978) ==
Jock Stein succeeded McGrory in 1965. A former player and team captain, Stein gained most of his fame as Celtic's manager, and is widely acknowledged as one of the greatest football managers in the history of the game. Stein is also famous for guiding Celtic to nine straight Scottish League wins from 1966 to 1974, equalling a world record held at the time by MTK Budapest and CSKA Sofia.

Jock Stein was formally announced as the new manager on 31 January 1965, although he did not take up his duties until March to allow Hibernian, who he was managing, time to find his replacement. Jimmy McGrory became the club's Public Relations Officer, a post he would retain until his retirement. Sean Fallon became Assistant Manager.

On Stein's arrival in March 1965, Celtic were struggling in the league and continued to have mixed results; Stein winning his first game 6–0 at Airdrie, but then losing 4–2 to Hibs and 6–2 to Falkirk. Celtic had progressed to the semi-finals of the 1964–65 Scottish Cup prior to Stein's arrival in March. Celtic came from behind twice against Motherwell in the semi-final to force 2–2 draw, then won the replay 3–0. This set up a final against Dunfermline on 24 April 1965. Celtic again came from behind twice before Billy McNeill scored the winning goal in the final minute to clinch a 3–2 win, giving Celtic their first major trophy since 1957.

In August 1965, Celtic became the first British football club to produce its own newspaper, The Celtic View. The paper started as a four-page weekly publication and was the brainchild of Jack McGinn who was working in the circulation department of Beaverbrook Newspapers. McGinn himself edited the paper for the first few years, with circulation initially reaching around 26,000 copies.

Season 1965–66 was Stein's first full season as manager at Celtic. He won his second trophy on 23 October 1965 as two converted penalty-kicks by John Hughes saw Celtic beat Rangers 2–1 in the League Cup final. Celtic clinched their first league title since 1954 on 7 May 1966 with a 1–0 win over Motherwell at Fir Park, finishing two points ahead of Rangers. As a sign of the progress under Stein, Celtic scored 30 more league goals in 1965–66 than they had done the previous year. Celtic also impressed in European competition, reaching the semi-finals of the European Cup Winner's Cup by knocking out Go Ahead Deventer, AGF Aarhus and Dynamo Kiev. Celtic lost 1–2 on aggregate to Liverpool in the semi-final, although a last minute Bobby Lennox 'goal' was controversially disallowed in the second leg at Anfield which would have seen Celtic win the tie via the recently implemented 'away goals' rule.

1967 was Celtic's annus mirabilis. The club won every competition they entered, scoring a world record total of 196 goals: the Scottish League, the Scottish Cup, the Scottish League Cup, the Glasgow Cup, and the European Cup. The League Cup was the first trophy to be won that season, courtesy of a 1–0 win on 29 October 1966 over Rangers in the final. The Glasgow Cup was secured a week later when Celtic beat Partick Thistle 4–0. Celtic's progression to the Scottish Cup was relatively straightforward aside from being taken to replay in the semi-final by Clyde. On 6 April 1967 Celtic met Aberdeen in the final, and two Willie Wallace goals eased Celtic to a 2–0 win. Celtic's league campaign proved to be a more tightly contested affair as, despite only losing twice, with two games remaining Rangers were still in contention. Celtic's penultimate league fixture was against Rangers at Ibrox, with a draw required to clinch the title. A brace by Jimmy Johnstone gave Celtic a 2–2 draw and the championship.

Celtic's European Cup campaign in 1966–67 was their first ever participation in Europe's premier club tournament. FC Zurich and Nantes were comfortably disposed of in the first two rounds (5–0 and 6–2 on aggregate respectively). The quarter final in March 1967 pitched Celtic against the Yugoslav champions, Vojvodina. The Yugoslav side won the first leg in Novi Sad 1–0. The return match in Glasgow proved to be a fraught affair. The Yugoslavs defended resolutely and threatened on the counter-attack, but Celtic levelled the tie on aggregate in the second half with a goal by Stevie Chalmers. Celtic pressed for a winner, but Vojvodina defended well and the tie looked like a play-off in neutral Brussels would be required. However, in the final minute Billy McNeill headed in a Charlie Gallacher cross to see Celtic progress to the semi-final. Celtic now faced Czechoslovak side, Dukla Prague. This time the first leg of the tie took place in Glasgow, with Celtic winning 3–1 courtesy of goals from Jimmy Johnstone and a Willie Wallace brace. In respect of his opponents' quality, Stein set up Celtic to be ultra-defensive for the second leg and forsake – temporarily – their philosophy of attacking football. The tactics worked as Celtic secured a 0–0 draw to put them in the final. However, Stein was almost apologetic about the manner of Celtic's success in that game and he felt uncomfortable in later years discussing the matter.

1967 European Cup Final line-up
(The Lisbon Lions)

The final saw Celtic play Inter Milan, with the match taking place at the Estádio Nacional on the outskirts of Lisbon on 25 May 1967. Celtic fell a goal behind after only seven minutes, Jim Craig adjudged to have fouled Renato Cappellini in the penalty box and Sandro Mazzola converting the resultant penalty. Celtic swept into constant attack after that but found Inter goalkeeper Giuliano Sarti in outstanding form. With 63 minutes played, after incessant pressure, Celtic finally equalised when Tommy Gemmell scored with a powerful 25-yard shot. The balance of play remained the same with Inter defending deeply against sustained Celtic attacking. With about five minutes remaining, a long-range shot from Bobby Murdoch was diverted by Stevie Chalmers past a wrong-footed Sarti. It proved to be the winning goal and thus Celtic became the first British team, and the first from outside Spain, Portugal or Italy to win the competition.

Jock Stein commented after the match,

Winning was important, but it was the way that we won that has filled me with satisfaction. We did it by playing football; pure, beautiful, inventive football. There was not a negative thought in our heads.

Celtic are one of only two clubs to have won the trophy with a team composed entirely of players from the club's home country; all of the players in the side were born within 30 miles of Celtic Park in Glasgow, and they subsequently became known as the 'Lisbon Lions'. The entire east stand at Celtic Park is dedicated to The Lisbon Lions, and the west stand to Jock Stein. The sight of captain Billy McNeill holding aloft the European Cup in the Estádio Nacional has become one of the iconic images of Scottish football. A statue outside Celtic Park showing Billy McNeill with the European Cup was unveiled in December 2015.

Two weeks later, on 7 June 1967, Celtic played Real Madrid in a testimonial match for the now retired Alfredo Di Stefano. In front of over 100,000 fans at the Bernabéu Stadium, the sides engaged in a keenly fought contest which saw Bertie Auld and Real Madrid's Amancio sent off. Di Stefano played for the first 15 minutes, but it was Jimmy Johnstone who stole the show with an exhilarating performance that had even the Spanish supporters chanting "Olé!" throughout the game in appreciation of his skill. Johnstone capped an outstanding performance by playing the pass to Bobby Lennox for the only goal in a 1–0 win for Celtic.

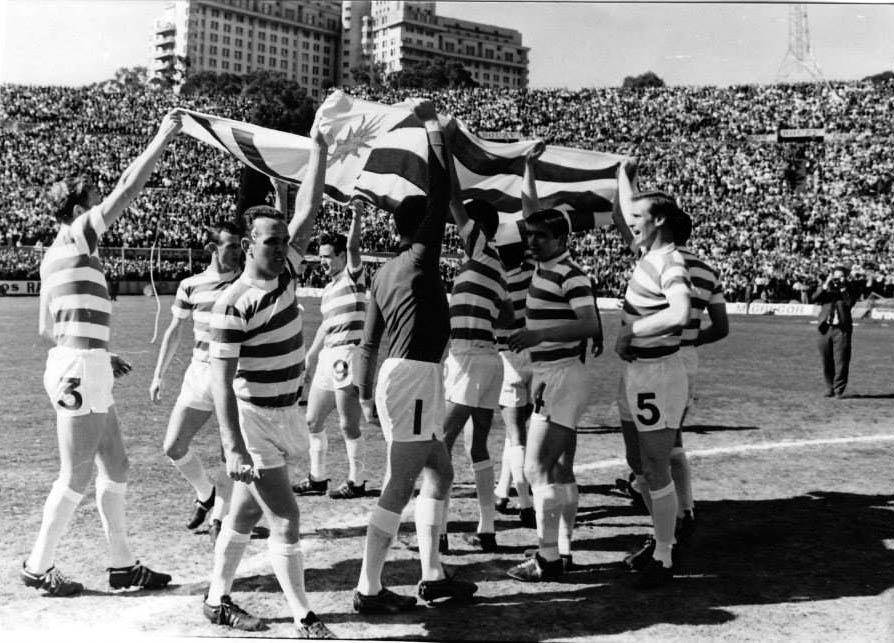
Celtic players raising a flag of Uruguay at Estadio Centenario before the 1967 Intercontinental Cup playoff v. Racing Club

The following season Celtic played Copa Libertadores champions Racing Club of Argentina in the Intercontinental Cup series during October and November 1967. The first game took place at Hampden Park, with Celtic winning 1–0 through a headed goal by Billy McNeill. The match however was marred by incessant foul play and spitting by the Argentinians. The return match in Buenos Aires was a torrid affair; goalkeeper Ronnie Simpson was struck by a missile thrown by the Racing Club fans as the teams prepared for kick-off and had to be replaced by stand-in, John Fallon. A Tommy Gemmell penalty put Celtic ahead in the first half but Racing Club rallied and goals from Norberto Raffo and Juan Carlos Cárdenas either side of half-time clinched a 2–1 for the South American champions. The series of games then went to a decider, played in Montevideo, Uruguay. The game was a shambles, exacerbated by Racing Club's continual cynical fouling and spitting and the incompetence of the Paraguayan referee who was clearly out of his depth. Riot police had to intervene on the pitch several times as six players were sent off; four from Celtic and two from Racing Club. Bertie Auld was the fourth Celtic player to be sent off, but refused to leave the field, whilst Tommy Gemmell kicked a Racing Club player in the genitals in one of numerous incidents missed by the referee. Racing Club scored the only goal of the game in the second half, winning the game 1–0 and the Intercontinental Cup. Celtic were criticised for their conduct in Montevideo, but the provocation in all three games was extreme and Jock Stein commented afterwards "I would not bring a team to South America again for all the money in the world."

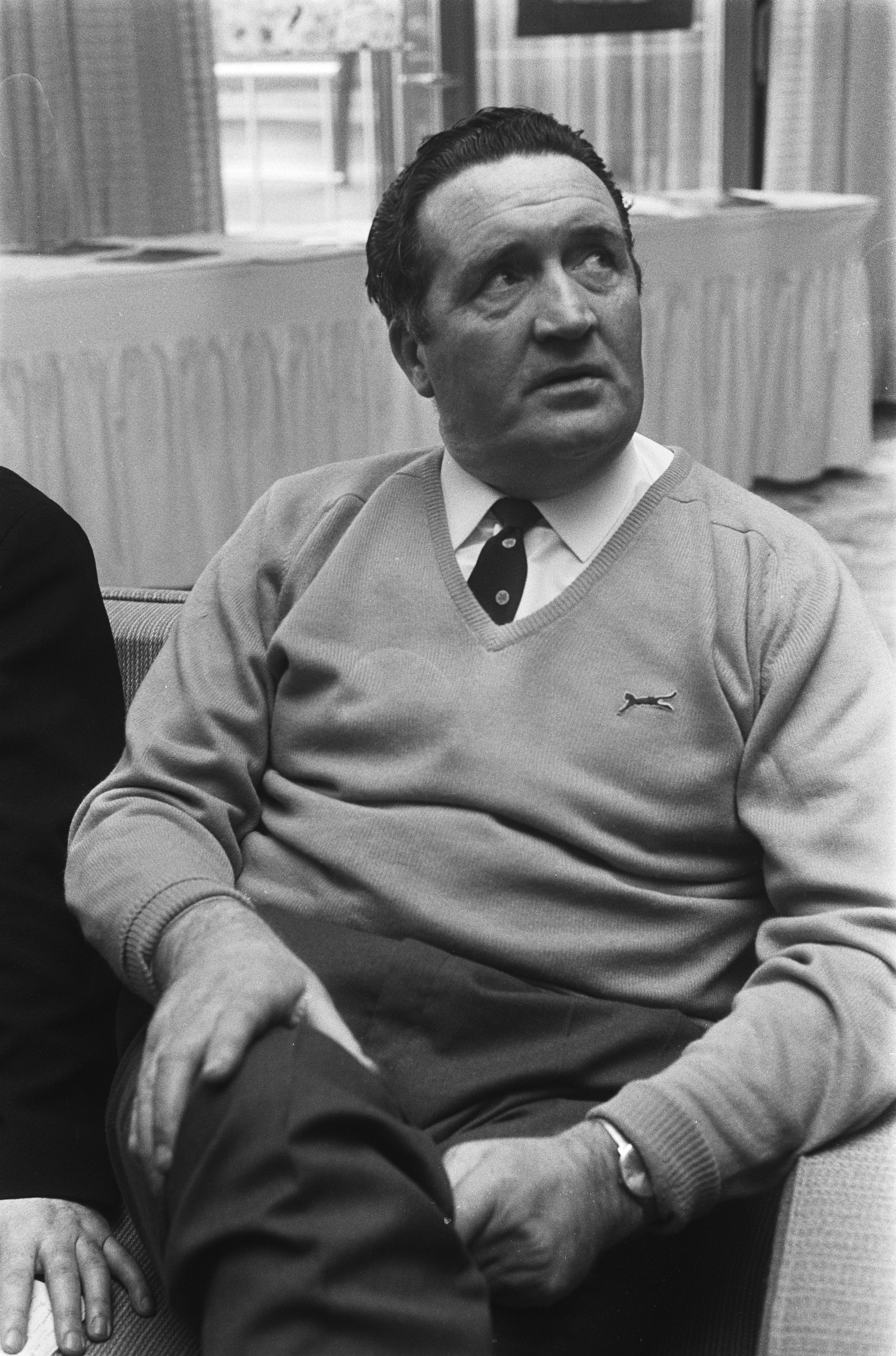
Jock Stein in an Amsterdam hotel, ahead of a European Cup tie against Ajax (1971)

Celtic put the trauma of their ill-fated Intercontinental Cup involvement behind them to win their third consecutive league title in 1967–68, again by a narrow margin over Rangers. They also won the League Cup, beating Dundee 5–3 in the final.

Season 1968–69 saw Celtic won another clean-sweep of the three major domestic trophies (League, Scottish Cup and League Cup) – a 'treble' – which included a 10–0 win over Hamilton Accies in the quarter-final of the League Cup and an emphatic 4–0 win over Rangers in the Scottish Cup Final to clinch their 50th major honour. This was only the club's second 'treble', and they would not repeat the feat again for another 32 years.

Celtic reached the European Cup Final again in 1970, a run which included a 3–0 win at Parkhead over Portuguese side Benfica in the second round. The semi-finals saw Celtic drawn against English champions Leeds Utd. This was the first occasion that the reigning champions of England and Scotland had played each other in a fully competitive European tie. The first leg took place at Elland Road, with a goal in the opening minute from George Connelly giving Celtic a 1–0 lead to take back to Glasgow for the second leg. The return match was played at Hampden Park on 15 April 1970 in front of a 136,505 crowd, a record attendance for a competitive European club tie that stands to this day. In 14 minutes, Billy Bremner scored from long range to level the tie on aggregate. Celtic kept their composure though, and equalised two minutes into the second half though a John Hughes header. Jimmy Johnstone had a particularly outstanding match and his mazy run set up Bobby Murdoch to score with a powerful shot, sealing a 2–1 win for Celtic on the night and their progression to the final.

The final took place on 6 May 1970 at the San Siro in Milan against Dutch side Feyenoord. Celtic were overwhelming favourites, but despite Tommy Gemmell opening the scoring after 30 minutes, they were comprehensively outplayed by the Dutch side and slumped to a 2–1 defeat after extra time.

The early 1970s saw the emergence from the reserves of a group of young players known as the 'Quality Street Gang'. This group included Danny McGrain, Kenny Dalglish, Davie Hay, Lou Macari and George Connelly; all of whom won major honours at Celtic and were capped by Scotland. This emerging group of players helped Celtic reach the semi-finals of the European Cup on a further two occasions, losing on penalties to Inter Milan in 1972 and 2–0 on aggregate to Spanish side Atlético Madrid in 1974.

The tie against the Spaniards was particularly acrimonious. Atlético were managed by Juan Carlos Lorenzo who had coached Argentina at the 1966 World Cup where his players were branded "animals" by Alf Ramsey. In the first leg at Parkhead, the Atlético players continually kicked and hacked their opponents. Three Atlético players were sent off, but their incessant foul play made it impossible, indeed physically dangerous, for Celtic to play their normal game. The match finished 0–0, and the sour evening was completed with a punch-up between the two sets of players as they made their way up the tunnel at full-time. In the buildup for the second leg in Spain, Jimmy Johnstone received a death threat over the hotel phone and a hate campaign from the Spanish media prevented the Celtic players from relaxing or training effectively. Atlético won the match 2–0, winning the tie on aggregate and progressing to the final against Bayern Munich where the Spanish side lost 4–0 after a replay.

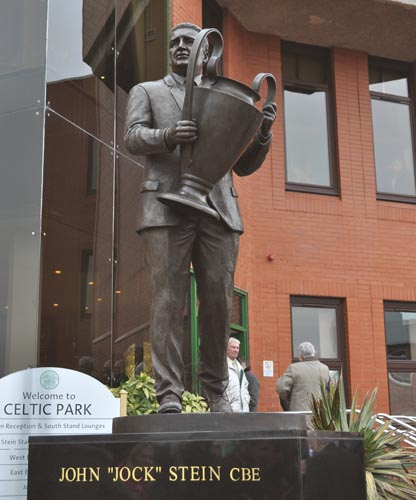
Jock Stein statue, created by the Sculptor John McKenna

On 6 May 1972, Celtic's Dixie Deans became the first player since 1904 to score a hat-trick in a Scottish Cup final. Celtic defeated Hibernian 6–1, with Celtic's third goal (and Deans' second) amongst the most famous of Scottish Cup Final goals. Deans intercepted a mis-directed Hibernian clearance, then rounded their goalkeeper to advance on goal along the by-line; he manoeuvred past a defender then rounded the goalkeeper again before shooting into the net. Deans then celebrated the goal with a spectacular somersault that was frequently re-played on television for years afterwards.

Celtic clinched their ninth successive league title at the end of season 1973–74, equalling the then world record held by MTK Budapest and CSKA Sofia. Celtic failed to win the league the following year, but continued to rack up trophies, beating Airdrie 3–1 on 3 May 1975 in the Scottish Cup final. The match was captain Billy McNeill's 822nd competitive appearance for the club and immediately prior to kick-off he informed his team-mates that he was now retiring. Nicknamed 'Cesar' by his colleagues, McNeill's career spanned 17 years and saw the centre-half become an integral part of Celtic during what is considered the club's halycon period. McNeill had arrived at Celtic in the late 1950s during Jock Stein's time as reserve team coach, and became Stein's right-hand man on the field upon his return as manager in 1965. He was very much the leader of the team, and years later in interview admitted that there were the occasional "verbal and physical" battles among the players; "Not too often. But we set a standard and, if someone was not meeting it, then, well..." The 1975 Scottish Cup was McNeill's 23rd major winner's medal as a player.

Stein was seriously injured in a car accident in the summer of 1975 and spent the next year recuperating. On his return for season 1976–77, he signed Hibernian's long-serving captain, defender Pat Stanton. Later on in the season, Stein signed attacking midfielder Alfie Conn from Tottenham Hotspur. It was a transfer that surprised many, given Conn had played for Rangers in the early 70s, winning the European Cup Winners Cup for them in 1972 and scoring in a 3–2 win over Celtic in the 1973 Scottish Cup Final. Conn became the first footballer post-World War II to play for both Rangers and Celtic. Celtic, helped considerably by Stanton's organisation of the defence, went on to win their tenth league and cup double; Celtic finished nine points ahead of Rangers in the league and beat them 1–0 in the cup final courtesy of an Andy Lynch penalty. During this period only Kenny Dalglish and Danny McGrain remained of the so-called Quality Street Kids, but other very promising players such as midfielder Tommy Burns, defender Roy Aitken and striker George McCluskey were emerging from the reserves. Aitken proved to be particularly versatile, being able to play effectively in midfield as well as defence. He also found himself in a bizarre situation in 1976 when had to be 'adopted' by Celtic in order to be allowed to enter East Germany to play a European tie. Aitken was still only 17 years old and the authorities there did not consider him to be an adult.

The following season, Stein's last as manager of Celtic, was a huge disappointment however. Celtic struggled to cope with the departure of Dalglish to Liverpool and long-term injuries to McGrain and Stanton. The club slumped to fifth place in the league, were knocked out of the Scottish Cup by lower-league Kilmarnock and were beaten 2–1 by Rangers in the League Cup Final.

In May 1978, Billy McNeill was appointed the new manager of Celtic, with former team-mate and fellow Lisbon Lion John Clark as his assistant. Jock Stein remained at Celtic for a further few months. There are conflicting reports as to whether Stein was actually offered a seat on the Board of Directors or not, but either way the specific role intended for him was to run the club's Football Pools. Stein did not relish that role, and preferring to remain in football with a 'hands-on' role, in August 1978 he left Celtic Park to take up the vacant managerial post at Leeds United.

Jock Stein is widely acknowledged as one of the most important influences on the development of Celtic Football Club since Willie Maley. Stein restored Celtic to a position of dominance in Scotland that they had not enjoyed since before World War I, and made the club a respected force throughout Europe. Stein added a new dimension to the position of 'manager' in Scotland, and his man-management style and grasp of the psychological side of the game was years ahead of its time. Stein was hugely respected by his peers and a massive influence on the next generation of managers who would follow in his footsteps, in particular Sir Alex Ferguson at Aberdeen and later Manchester United.

== Billy McNeill and Davie Hay (1978–1991) ==
Billy McNeill (nicknamed "Cesar") the former player and captain of The Lisbon Lions, took over as manager in August 1978. The return from injury of Danny McGrain and shrewd signings such as winger Davie Provan and midfielder Murdo MacLeod helped McNeill strengthen a Celtic side that had finished fifth in the league previous season. In May 1979 Celtic's final league fixture was an Old Firm fixture against Rangers at Parkhead. A win would clinch the 1978–79 league title for Celtic, but any other result would leave Rangers as favourites for the league as they had two additional games to play. Celtic attacked from the start but trailed 1–0 at half-time through an Alex MacDonald goal for Rangers. Johnny Doyle was then sent-off in the second half, leaving Celtic a man down as well as a goal down. Celtic though, responded in exhilarating style through goals from Roy Aitken and George McCluskey to go 2–1 ahead. Celtic's lead only lasted a couple of minutes, Bobby Russell equalising with a fine strike. As the game neared the end, and with Celtic attacking relentlessly, a McCluskey cross was parried by Rangers goalkeeper Peter McCloy against one of his own defenders, Colin Jackson, and then rebounded back into the goal to put Celtic 3–2 ahead. In the final minute Murdo MacLeod put the matter beyond doubt when he hammered home a powerful 20 yard strike to secure a 4–2 win on the night and clinch the title in the most dramatic of circumstances.

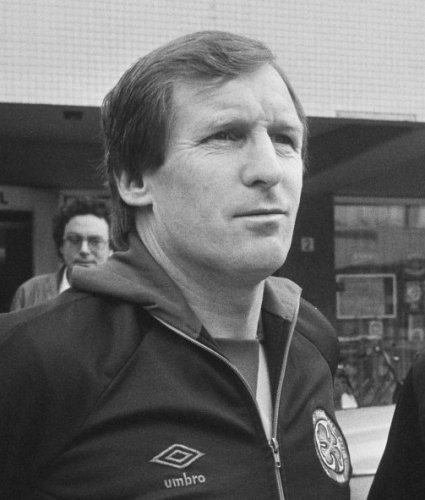
Billy McNeill in September 1982

The following season Celtic reached the quarter-finals of the European Cup. Celtic were drawn against Real Madrid, and goals from George McCluskey and Johnny Doyle gave Celtic a 2–0 win in the first leg at Parkhead. Two weeks later at the Bernabeu Stadium, Celtic were beaten 3–0 and went out on aggregate. That season, Celtic held an eight-point lead in the league at one stage, but a strong emerging Aberdeen side caught up on them and pipped them to the title. Celtic did win the Scottish Cup, a George McCluskey goal giving Celtic a 1–0 win after extra-time in a tight encounter with Rangers in May 1980. The aftermath of the game however is now notorious for the riot that took place between the rival fans that day. Crowds of Celtic fans raced onto the pitch to celebrate at full-time. A section of Rangers fans quickly invaded the pitch in response and confronted the Celtic fans. A pitched battle then ensued between the two groups of supporters, with both clubs later fined £20,000.

McNeill led Celtic to another two league titles in 1981 and 1982, and oversaw the emergence of another crop of promising young players such as Charlie Nicholas, Paul McStay and Irish goalkeeper Pat Bonner. Nicholas by 1983 was one of Scottish football's most exciting prospects. He had formed a deadly goalscoring partnership with Frank McGarvey and in season 1982–83 he scored 48 goals in the major competitions. These goals included an excellent goal in a 2–1 win over Ajax in the European Cup, the opening goal in Celtic's 2–1 League Cup Final over Rangers in December 1982, and a brace in the final league game of the season at Ibrox, Celtic coming back to defeat Rangers 4–2 after trailing 0–2 at half-time. Nicholas' form attracted the attention of several big-name English clubs, and at the end of the season he moved to Arsenal in an £750,000 deal.

Paul McStay made his league debut at 17 years of age, scoring in a 3–1 win over Aberdeen on 30 January 1982. The McStay family had a strong presence at Celtic; Paul's great-uncles Willie and Jimmy McStay both captained Celtic in the inter-war years, with Jimmy managing Celtic during the Second World War. Paul's older brother, Willie McStay, also played regularly for Celtic in the early to mid-1980s. Paul McStay went on to become a fixture in the first team, and his skillful performances saw him recognised at international level. In 1983 he became the first Scotland player to be capped at youth, Under 21 and Senior level in the space of 12 months.

McNeill had by this stage won a trophy in each of his seasons as manager, despite the rise of the so-called 'New Firm' of Aberdeen and Dundee United in the 1980s. However, an inability to gel with the then Chairman Desmond White, and dispute over the transfer funds from the sale of Charlie Nicholas to Arsenal saw relations between the manager and the Celtic Board deteriorate. Matters came to a head when McNeill attempted to negotiate a contract and pay rise. It was not an unreasonable request given McNeill was not only lower paid than Jim McLean (Dundee United), Alex Ferguson (Aberdeen) and John Greig (Rangers), but he was also lower paid than the managers of Motherwell and St Johnstone. Desmond White issued a press release stating "Mr McNeill's request for a contract and wages increase have been unanimously rejected by the Celtic board of directors." Rebuffed and publicly humiliated by the Board, McNeill's first spell as manager came to an abrupt end, and he left the club in June 1983 to join Manchester City.

Another former player David Hay took over from McNeill in July 1983, but finished runner-up in each of the domestic tournaments in his first season as manager; finishing 2nd in the league to Aberdeen, runners-up to Rangers in the League Cup and losing 1–2 after extra time to Aberdeen in an acrimonious Scottish Cup Final which saw Celtic's Roy Aitken sent off. Despite the lack of trophies, new striker Brian McClair who had been signed in the summer of 1983 from Motherwell impressed by scoring 32 goals. The following year proved even more stressful for Celtic as they found themselves embroiled in a series of controversial matches in the European Cup Winner's Cup against Rapid Vienna. Celtic lost the first leg 1–3 in Austria, but despite rough-house tactics from the Austrians, it was only Celtic's Alan McInally who found himself red-carded. The return match at Parkhead was an even more bad-tempered affair as Celtic raced to a 3–0 lead in spite of Rapid Vienna's foul play. The match erupted near the end when Tommy Burns was punched by a Rapid Vienna player. In the ensuing chaos, coins and at least one bottle were thrown onto the pitch by Celtic fans. None appeared to hit anybody, but one of the Rapid Vienna players was carried off the pitch with his head swathed in bandages. The match finished 3–0, with Celtic winning the tie 4–3 on aggregate. However, Rapid Vienna appealed – citing the alleged injury to their player. The initial appeal was dismissed by UEFA, but a second appeal from Rapid Vienna was upheld and a replay was ordered to take place at least 150 kilometres (90 miles) from Glasgow. The Celtic board acquiesced to this decision in spite of considered opinion that Celtic should withdraw from the tournament on principle. As such, the match at Parkhead was declared void and a third match was held in Manchester at Old Trafford. Celtic lost 0–1, and two Celtic fans assaulted Rapid Vienna players. UEFA fined Celtic and ordered their next home European tie to take place behind closed doors. This was an episode that highlighted both UEFA corruption and the incompetence of a spineless Celtic board.

The same season saw Celtic taking up shirt sponsorship for the first time, with Fife-based double glazing firm CR Smith having their logo emblazoned on the front of the team jersey. The new sponsored strips were worn for the first time on 29 September 1984 in an away league match against Dundee at Dens Park.

May 1985 saw David Hay win his first trophy as manager, as Celtic overturned a 1–0 deficit in the centenary final of the Scottish Cup to defeat Dundee United 2–1. Trailing to Dundee United, Hay make a tactical change in the second half by pushing Roy Aitken forward from central defence into midfield. The move proved a success as Aitken's presence in midfield began to galvanise Celtic. A virtuoso free-kick from Davie Provan in 77 minutes equalised the earlier goal from Dundee Utd's Stuart Beedie, only the third occasion that a goal had been scored direct from a free-kick in a Scottish Cup Final. Five minutes from the end, a driving run and cross from down the right by Aitken set up a diving header from Frank McGarvey to win the game for Celtic.

The following year, Celtic clinched the league title on the last day of the season under the most improbable of circumstances. In order to win the title, Celtic were required to win their final game by a margin of three goals or more against St Mirren at Love Street, and hope Hearts would lose to Dundee at Dens Park. Celtic raced into a 4–0 lead by half-time, whilst the game at Dens Park remained goal-less. Celtic scored a fifth early in the second half. In 83 minutes Albert Kidd scored for Dundee against Hearts. Celtic fans celebrated wildly at Love Street, but an equaliser from Hearts could still have seen the title go to Tynecastle. Five minutes later however, Kidd added a second for Dundee, seeing Hearts lose their match 2–0, with Celtic's 5–0 win sealing the league championship title via goal difference.

The following season saw Rangers spending heavily under new player-manager Graeme Souness. Celtic started the season brightly but soon squandered a seven-point lead, with Rangers winning their first title since 1978. Celtic lost 1–2 to Rangers in the League Cup Final, with manager Davie Hay so exasperated by the controversial penalty for Rangers which resulted in their winning goal, that he stated afterwards that if it was up to him, "I would apply for Celtic to join the English league tomorrow." Celtic were knocked out of the Scottish Cup by Hearts in February 1987, and despite an outstanding season from striker Brian McClair in which he scored 41 goals, Celtic finished the season trophyless. Davie Hay was sacked on 28 May 1987, and Billy McNeill returned as manager.

When Billy McNeill returned to manage the club in 1987, he oversaw significant change in playing personnel over the summer. Strikers Brian McClair, Mo Johnston and Alan McInally had left, as well as midfielder Murdo MacLeod. Winger Davie Provan retired due to ill-health, veteran defender and captain Danny McGrain had been given a free transfer whilst Irish international centre-half Mick McCarthy had arrived from Manchester City, signed by Davie Hay a few weeks before his sacking. McNeill signed three players over the summer; right-back Chris Morris from Sheffield Wednesday, goalscoring midfielder Billy Stark from Aberdeen and striker Andy Walker from Motherwell. As the season progressed, Frank McAvennie arrived from West Ham and young forward Joe Miller – a very promising prospect – was signed from Aberdeen.

This new-look Celtic side, captained by Roy Aitken, quickly gelled and embarked on a 31-game unbeaten run, culminating in a historic League Championship and Scottish Cup double win in the club's centenary season. Walker and McAvennie forged a successful partnership up front whilst Paul McStay enjoyed his finest season, winning both the SPFA and Scottish Football Writers player of the year awards. Celtic clinched the league title on 23 April 1988 with a 3–0 win over Dundee in front of what appeared to be an overcrowded Celtic Park. The latter stages of the Scottish Cup provided plenty drama for fans. In the semi-final against Hearts, Celtic trailed 0–1 going into the final three minutes and looked devoid of inspiration until Hearts' goalkeeper Henry Smith fumbled a cross which was thumped into the goal by Mark McGhee to level the match. A replay looked certain until in injury time, Smith under pressure from McGhee failed to deal with another ball into the box, with Andy Walker scoring the winner from close range. The Cup Final, on 14 May 1987, saw Dundee United take the lead early in the second half. Frank McAvennie equalised in 75 minutes, heading an Anton Rogan cross past United goalkeeper Billy Thomson. With about a minute remaining, McAvennie scored again to win the Cup for Celtic.

However, the success generated by McNeill's return was followed by a dismal performance in the league the following season, along with a 5–1 defeat by Rangers at Ibrox in the opening Old Firm clash. Celtic did retain the Scottish Cup in 1989 though, beating Rangers 1–0 through a Joe Miller strike.

The 1989–90 season was a very disappointing one. Celtic's new Polish striker Dariusz Dziekanowski scored four goals at Parkhead in the second leg of a first round European Cup Winners Cup encounter with Partizan Belgrade, but the team still went out of the competition under the away goals rule. The team's league campaign was dreadful and they eventually finished fifth. Celtic did reach the Scottish Cup Final in 1990, but after the match finished 0–0 (after extra time) Aberdeen beat them 9–8 on penalties. During that season, Celtic captain Roy Aitken left to join Newcastle United, with Paul McStay taking over the captaincy of the side.

In May 1990 former Lord Provost of Glasgow, Michael Kelly, and property developer Brian Dempsey joined the Celtic board; teaming up with Chairman Jack McGinn and existing directors Chris White, Kevin Kelly, James Farrell and Tom Grant. Dempsey did not last long, a dispute about a proposed relocation from Parkhead to Robroyston resulted in him being voted off the board five months later. This would be the beginning of several years of public acrimony within the Celtic board.

Season 1990–91 saw Celtic's league fortunes fall away fairly quickly, despite their centre-back Paul Elliott being voted Players' Player of the Year. They did reach the Skol Cup Final in October only to be beaten in extra time by Rangers. In December 1990, Celtic appointed their first ever Chief Executive, Terry Cassidy. Cassidy had an impressive background but his abrasive nature did not go down well in Scottish football. On the pitch, Celtic gained a modicum of revenge over Rangers for their earlier Skol Cup Final defeat in a 1991 Scottish Cup quarter-final tie with their rivals, beating them 2–0 through Gerry Creaney and Dariusz Wdowczyk goals. It was a wild St. Patrick's Day encounter which saw three Rangers players (Terry Hurlock, Mark Walters and Mark Hateley) and one Celtic player (Peter Grant) get the red card. However, the joy was short-lived as Motherwell knocked them out of the semi-final 4–2.

Another lacklustre season had left McNeill in an almost hopeless position and his credibility was further undermined when Chief Executive Terry Cassidy made public a strategy for sacking McNeill should the need arise. It was no surprise when the beleaguered McNeill left the club for the last time at the end of the 1990–91 season.

== Liam Brady and Lou Macari (1991–1994) ==
Liam Brady took charge of Celtic shortly after McNeill departed and became only the eighth manager in over 100 years, but the first to have not previously been a player at the club. Despite his credentials as a player with Arsenal, Juventus and the Republic of Ireland, he failed to bring any measure of success to the club in a managerial capacity.

Brady made several moves in the transfer market during his first season. Striker Tony Cascarino was signed for a club record £1.1 million from Aston Villa in the summer of 1991. Cascarino was not a success at Celtic and was moved on to Chelsea in a swap deal for Scotland defender Tom Boyd in February 1992. In an attempt to bolster Celtic's defence, Liverpool defender Gary Gillespie was signed in August 1991 for £925,000. However, Gillespie struggled to adapt to the more robust style of play in Scotland, so Brady signed Middlesbrough's Tony Mowbray a few months later in a £1 million deal to add steel to a light-weight central defence. Unfortunately both Gillespie and Mowbray's spells at Celtic were blighted by injuries and the pair did not often play together.

On 23 October 1991, in the first leg of an away UEFA Cup encounter against Swiss side Neuchâtel Xamax, Celtic lost 5–1 as Egyptian striker Hossam Hassan ran amok against the Celtic defence by scoring four goals, one of the worst European defeats in the club's history. In the return leg at Celtic Park, they could only manage a 1–0 victory and crashed out of the tournament 5–2 on aggregate. Celtic came third in the league in May 1992 behind Rangers and Hearts, lost to Airdrie on penalties in a League Cup quarter-final tie after a 0–0 draw, and were knocked out of the Scottish Cup by 10-man Rangers in the semi-finals.

Celtic were also toiling off the field. The club failed to secure a shirt sponsor for season 1992–93, and for the first time since the early 1980s Celtic took to the field in 'unblemished' hoops. Peversely, despite the loss of marketing revenue, sales of the new unsponsored replica top increased dramatically. Chief Executive Terry Cassidy continued to stir controversy, and was finally sacked on 26 October 1992, with club announcing they had no immediate plans to fill the post.

Brady made several more personnel changes to the Celtic side for 1992–93, selling defenders Derek Whyte and Chris Morris whilst bringing in forwards Stuart Slater (for a then record fee of £1.5m) and Andy Payton from England, and right-back Rudi Vata, the first Albanian to play in British football. Celtic's domestic form proved to be no better than the previous season, losing 1–0 to Aberdeen in the semi-final of the League Cup, a disappointing 2–0 defeat at Falkirk in the Scottish Cup, and a fourth-place finish in the league. Europe provided a brief respite for Brady, Celtic recovering from a 2–0 first leg defeat away at Cologne in the UEFA Cup to win the return match in Glasgow 3–0, midfielder John Collins scoring the decisive third goal seven minutes from time. Collins had been signed from Hibernian by Billy McNeill in the summer of 1990, but after a mediocre first season became one of the few players to genuinely flourish during Liam Brady's tenure as manager.

The summer of 1993 saw Scottish-born Canadian business man, Fergus McCann emerge as one of several individuals and consortia attempting to take over from the existing Board at Celtic. Along with various fan groups also dedicated to removing the Board at Celtic, these groups and individuals came to be known collectively as the 'Rebels'.

Celtic regained shirt sponsorship for season 1993–94, with CR Smith returning as shirt sponsors in a four-year deal. On the pitch, Celtic were soon toiling again and Brady departed in October 1993 after a league defeat at St Johnstone.

Lou Macari was appointed the new manager of Celtic on 27 October 1993. Celtic's form didn't improve and a miserable 4–2 defeat by Rangers in the New Year fixture at Parkhead left them languishing in the league. Macari made several moves in the transfer market – none of them particularly successful. Gerry Creaney, one of the few consistent goalscorers at Celtic at that time, was played out of position on the right-wing for several weeks before being sold to Portsmouth for £600,000. Striker Willie Falconer was signed from Sheffield United, right-back Lee Martin and goalkeeper Carl Muggleton came north from England, and in what is considered one of Macari's poorest moves, Andy Payton moved to Barnsley in a part-exchange deal for journeyman striker Wayne Biggins.

An early Scottish Cup exit in January 1994 at Motherwell sealed another dismal season for Celtic. However, events off the field were gathering momentum. Two consortia, one headed by Fergus McCann and the other by Gerald Weisfeld, were vying to take over Celtic. The Celtic Board were, however, pushing forward plans for the building of a new stadium at Cambuslang. On 25 February 1994, Celtic held a press conference where they announced that funding was in place for the new stadium via Swiss merchant bank, Gefinor. However, later that day Gefinor denied that funding had been agreed for the project, and that same evening the proposed plans were being ridiculed by the Scottish television and radio media.

The days that followed saw any remaining credibility that the Celtic Board had vanish. The Bank of Scotland summoned the Celtic Board on 3 March 1994 and informed them that unless a guarantee of £1m was found within 24 hours then they would begin the process of winding up the club affairs. The following day, Fergus McCann became the new owner of Celtic with a new team of directors appointed. Brian Dempsey, former director and heavily involved in the campaign for change, pledged £1 million of his own money to assist the McCann takeover, and stated "the rebels have won".

== See also ==
- History of Celtic F.C. (1994–present)
