= Équancourt =

- Commune
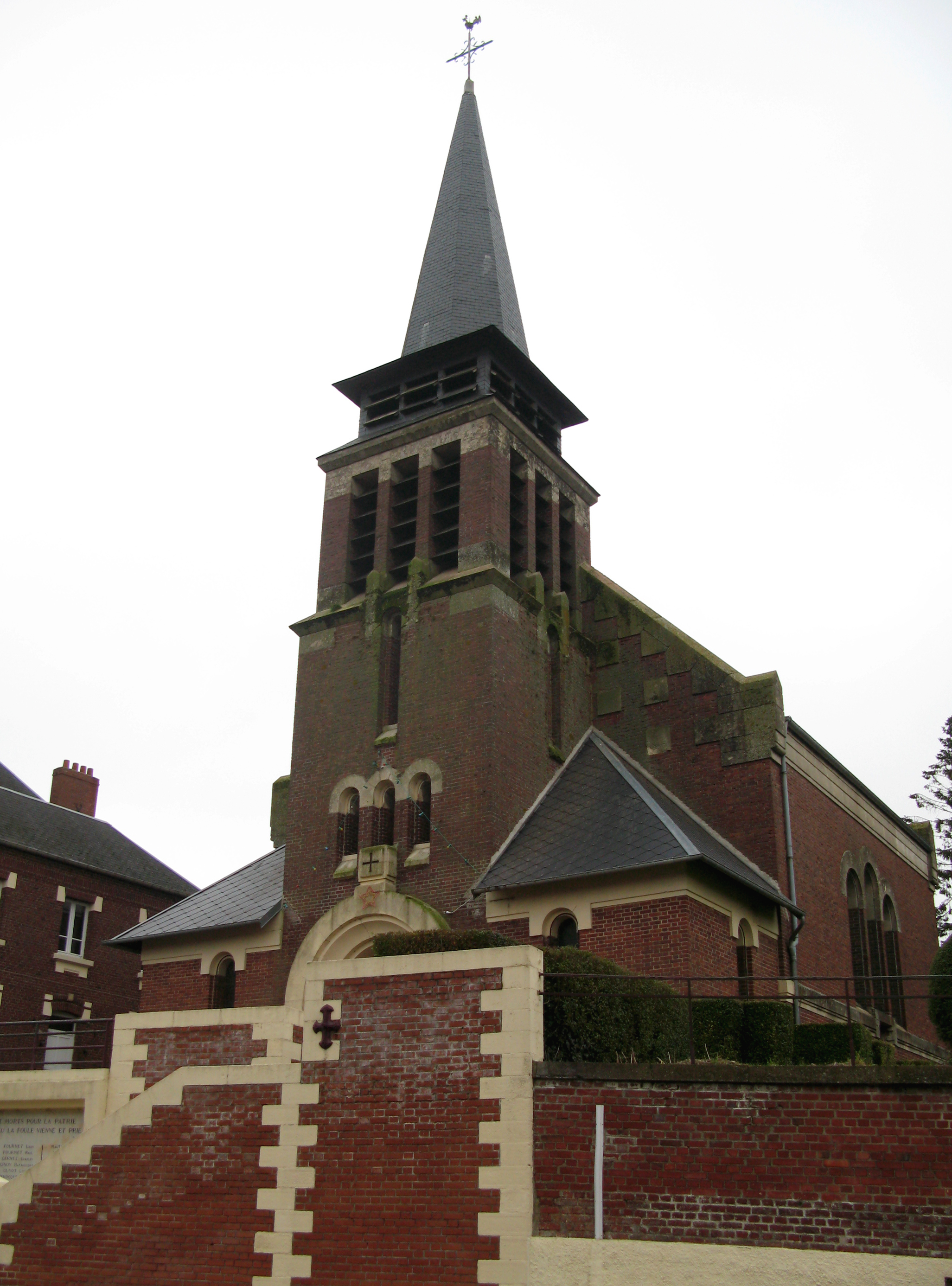
- St. Martin's Church
- Location of Équancourt
- Location within France Location within Hauts-de-France
- Coordinates: 50°02′12″N 3°01′10″E
- Country: France
- Region: Hauts-de-France
- Department: Somme
- Arrondissement: Péronne
- Canton: Péronne
- Intercommunality: Haute Somme

Government
  - Mayor (2020–2026): Christophe Decomble
- Area^{1}: 7.79 km^{2} (3.01 sq mi)
- Elevation: 96 m (315 ft)
- Highest elevation: 147 m (482 ft)
- Lowest elevation: 88 m (289 ft)
- Population (2023): 300
  - Density: 39/km^{2} (100/sq mi)
- Time zone: UTC+01:00 (CET)
  - Summer (DST): UTC+02:00 (CEST)
- INSEE/Postal code: 80275 /80360
- ^{1} French Land Register data, which excludes lakes, ponds, glaciers > 1 km^{2} (0.386 sq mi or 247 acres) and river estuaries.

Équancourt (French pronunciation: [ekɑ̃kuʁ]) is a commune in the Somme department in Hauts-de-France in northern France.

== Geography ==
Équancourt is situated on the D58 road, some 32 km (20 mi) northwest of Saint-Quentin.

== Population ==
Historical population
Year	Pop.	±% p.a.
1968	417	—
1975	326	−3.46%
1982	320	−0.27%
1990	293	−1.10%
1999	280	−0.50%
2007	316	+1.52%
2012	308	−0.51%
2017	298	−0.66%
2023	300	+0.11%
Source: INSEE

== See also ==
- Communes of the Somme department
- Rocquigny-Equancourt Road British Cemetery
