= Rocquigny-Equancourt Road British Cemetery =

War cemetery located in Somme, in France

Coordinates: 50.0445°N 2.9999°E

Rocquigny-Equancourt Road British Cemetery is a war grave for mainly Commonwealth soldiers who died in the First World War. It was designed by Sir Reginald Blomfield in the 1920s and contains the bodies of 2,046 people: 1,817 identified Commonwealth casualties plus 21 unidentified casualties; also 198 German casualties and 10 French civilians.

Among the burials are Victoria Cross recipient John Harold Rhodes, Edward Horner, a member of a prominent British aristocratic family, and Archie McMillan Scottish professional footballer.

The cemetery lies in countryside east of Amiens in the Somme department of France between Rocquigny and Équancourt.
