= Archie McMillan =

Scottish footballer

Personal information
- Full name: Archibald McMillan
- Date of birth: 1894
- Place of birth: Campbeltown, Scotland
- Date of death: 23 November 1917 (aged 22–23)
- Place of death: Cambrai, France
- Position: Outside left

Senior career*
Years	Team	Apps	(Gls)
1913–1914	Celtic	0	(0)
1914–1915	Ayr United	4	(0)
- * Club domestic league appearances and goals

Archibald McMillan (1894 – 23 November 1917) was a Scottish professional footballer who played in the Scottish League for Ayr United as an outside left.

== Personal life ==
McMillan served as a private in the Argyll and Sutherland Highlanders during the First World War. In November 1917, he and his regiment were involved in an attack on Bourlon Ridge during the Battle of Cambrai. At some point between 21 and 23 November 1917, McMillan was fatally wounded at Fontaine-Notre-Dame and he died of his wounds on 23 November 1917. He was buried in Rocquigny-Equancourt Road British Cemetery.

== Career statistics ==
Appearances and goals by club, season and competition
Club	Season	League			National Cup		Total	
Club	Season	Division	Apps	Goals	Apps	Goals	Apps	Goals
Ayr United	1914–15	Scottish First Division	4	0	―		4	0
Career total			4	0	0	0	4	0
