= William Angus (VC) =

Scottish Victoria Cross recipient (1888-1959)

William Angus VC
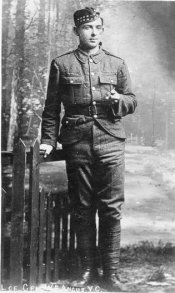
- Born: 28 February 1888; Armadale, Scotland
- Died: 14 June 1959 (aged 71); Carluke, Scotland
- Burial place: Wilton Cemetery, Carluke
- Military career
- Allegiance: United Kingdom
- Branch: British Army
- Service years: 1914–1915
- Rank: Lance Corporal
- Units: The Highland Light Infantry
- Conflicts: World War I: Western Front (WIA)
- Awards: Victoria Cross
- Other work: Professional footballer

William Angus VC (28 February 1888 – 14 June 1959), also known as Willie Angus, was a Scottish recipient of the Victoria Cross, the highest and most prestigious award for gallantry in the face of the enemy that can be awarded to British and Commonwealth forces.

== Early life ==
Angus was born at Polkemmet Rows, Cappers, Armadale. After leaving school he was employed as a miner, but was able to find himself a place as a professional footballer at Carluke Rovers, before moving to Celtic, although he never played for the first team. Angus made two Scottish League appearances on loan to Vale of Leven in 1912. Released in 1914, he joined Wishaw Thistle, the club he was captaining when war was declared in August. As a member of local Territorial battalion of the Highland Light Infantry, he was mobilised immediately.

== First World War ==
Early in 1915 his company, from 8th Bn HLI, was transferred to the 8th Royal Scots, the first Territorial battalion to join the Expeditionary Force. 8th Royal Scots had suffered a great many casualties and were in urgent need of replacements. He was serving as a lance-corporal in this battalion when the following deed took place for which he was awarded the Victoria Cross.

=== Victoria Cross ===
On 12 June 1915 at Givenchy-lès-la-Bassée, France, Lance-Corporal Angus voluntarily left his trench to rescue a wounded officer, fellow Carluke man Lieutenant James Martin, who was lying within a few yards of the enemy's position and had been injured by a mine. To do this he had to travel through 64 metres in no-man's land under heavy bomb and rifle fire, and received about 40 wounds, some of them being very serious, including the loss of his left eye. His commanding officer said there had been no braver deed in the history of the British Army.

== Aftermath ==
After the rescue he was taken to a military hospital in Boulogne-sur-Mer, where he learned of his award of the Victoria Cross. After 2 months in hospital he returned to London where he was given the Victoria Cross by King George V at Buckingham Palace on 30 August 1915. When the King commented on his 40 injuries, Angus was said to have answered "Aye, sir, but only 13 were serious.".

After he had returned to Carluke, he was given a hero's welcome and received standing ovations at Celtic Park and Ibrox. Following the war, he started business as a goods carrier. He married and had five children.

He also became president of Carluke Rovers, a position he held until his death in 1959. Each year of his life, he received a telegram of thanks from the family of the man he rescued.

He is buried, together with his wife Mary, at Wilton Cemetery, in Carluke. His grave is easily found, at the North Eastern part of the Wilton, as the headstone has the image of a VC engraved on it. His Victoria Cross is displayed at the National War Museum of Scotland in Edinburgh Castle, Scotland.

In 2015, on the centenary of his heroic acts, a commemorative stone was laid in Carluke. A memorial stone was also laid at his birthplace in Armadale.

== See also ==
- Celtic F.C. and World War I
