= Bob Craig (Scottish footballer) =

Scottish footballer

Personal information
- Full name: Robert Craig
- Date of birth: 2 May 1886
- Place of birth: Beith, Scotland
- Date of death: 19 April 1918 (aged 31)
- Place of death: Boulogne-sur-Mer, France
- Position: Full back

Senior career*
Years	Team	Apps	(Gls)
–1906	Vale of Garnock Strollers		
1906–1913	Celtic	13	(0)
1907	→ Stenhousemuir (loan)		
1908	→ Kilmarnock (loan)		
1908	→ Morton (loan)	3	(0)
1909	→ Ayr (loan)		
- → Brighton & Hove Albion (loan)
- → Carlisle United (loan)
- → Darlington (loan)
1910–1911	→ Renton (loan)		
1911	→ Bo'ness (loan)		
1911–1912	→ Dundee Hibernian (loan)	19	(4)
1913	→ Southend United (loan)		
1913	→ Abercorn (loan)		
1913–1914	Abertillery		
- * Club domestic league appearances and goals

Robert Craig (2 May 1886 – 19 April 1918) was a Scottish professional footballer who played as a full back in the Scottish Football League for Dundee Hibernian, Celtic and Morton.

== Personal life ==
Craig was born in May 1886 in Beith, Ayrshire, the son of William and Elizabeth Craig. His father was a French polisher.

== First World War ==
Robert Craig served as a private in the South Wales Borderers during the First World War and was wounded during a German attack at Messines, Belgium on 11 April 1918, during the German spring offensive. He was moved to No. 13 General Hospital, Boulogne-sur-Mer, France and died on 19 April 1918, a few weeks shy of his 32nd birthday. He was buried in Boulogne Eastern Cemetery.

== Career statistics ==
Appearances and goals by club, season and competition
Club	Season	League			National Cup		Other		Total	
Club	Season	Division	Apps	Goals	Apps	Goals	Apps	Goals	Apps	Goals
Celtic	1906–07	Scottish First Division	9	0	0	0	1 (Note: Appearance in Glasgow Cup)	0	10	0
Celtic	1907–08	Scottish First Division	1	0	0	0	—		1	0
Celtic	1908–09	Scottish First Division	3	0	0	0	—		3	0
Celtic	Total		13	0	0	0	1	0	14	0
Morton (loan)	1908–09	Scottish First Division	3	0	—		—		3	0
Dundee Hibernian (loan)	1911–12	Scottish Second Division	19	4	0	0	5 (Note: 4 appearances in Consolation Cup, 1 appearance in Qualifying Cup)	0	24	4
Career total			35	4	0	0	6	0	41	4
