= 1907–08 Dumbarton F.C. season =

Dumbarton
1907–1908 season
- Stadium: Boghead Park, Dumbarton
- Scottish League Division Two: 2nd
- Top goalscorer: League: Johnny Hill (13); All: Johnny Hill (16)
Home colours

The 1907–08 season was the 31st Scottish football season in which Dumbarton competed at the national level, entering the Scottish Football League, the Scottish Qualifying Cup and the inaugural Scottish Consolation Cup. In addition Dumbarton played in the Dumbartonshire Cup.

== Story of the Season ==
=== August ===
The season opened as it had last year with a friendly against old rivals Queen’s Park at Boghead. Peter Taylor who had signed up after last year’s county championship final came in at centre forward and duly scored a hat trick in an impressive 4–1 win.

Two days later Leith Athletic were the visitors in the first league encounter of the season. New signing Thomson came in at left back and as McCulloch, the right back had been signed towards the latter stages of the previous season, the defence was untried. However on the day the Sons were the better team and despite going a goal down they came back strongly and were well worth the 2–1 win.

For the third week in a row Dumbarton were the hosts, this time to Arthurlie in their first league fixture. The team that took the field was unchanged other than for Kane who took Gordon’s place at left half. The Sons were quick starters with Hill scoring in the first minute – and had added another two before the interval. Although the visitors came back into the game to some extent in the second half, a Taylor hat trick contributed to a fine 6–2 win.

On 31 August Dumbarton made the short trip to neighbours Vale of Leven in the league. As well as Gordon returning, there were two new signings on show – Bob McLean (ex Newcastle United) at centre half and William Strang (ex East Stirling) at inside left. Taylor added to his season’s total with a goal after thirty minutes and despite missing a second half penalty the final whistle sounded with Dumbarton 1–0 victors.

So after an unbeaten start, Dumbarton led the Second Division with 6 points from their three games, the same as Abercorn in second who had an inferior goal average.

=== September ===
A week after their league success Dumbarton returned to Millburn Park to play Vale of Leven, but this time in the first round of the Qualifying Cup. Hill was unavailable due to injury and his place on the left wing was taken by Teasdale. In addition Stevenson returned at centre half. A good match took place and after the Sons took the lead on 20 minutes, the Vale equalised on the stroke of half time. The home side had much the better of the play in the second half and it was no surprise when they scored what would prove to be the winner.

On 13 September, Dumbarton entertained Cowdenbeath in the league. McLean came in at left half and Gordon switched to left wing in place of Teasdale. Two Brander goals in the first half had Dumbarton in control and while the Fifers got one back Strang restored the two goal advantage for a fine 3–1 win.

The following week Dumbarton were free from competitive commitments and travelled to play Wishaw Thistle in a friendly. A couple of trialists were tried out on the day and in the end Dumbarton got the best of their opponents by 2–1.

On 27 September Dumbarton took on Ayr at Boghead in a league fixture. The game was originally scheduled to be played at Ayr but because of a cup tie being played at Ayr Parkhouse, it was agreed to switch in order to avoid the clash. Kane took Stevenson’s place in the half back line, while Teasdale returned to replace Strang at inside left. The league leaders were quickly into their stride and were two up within 14 minutes. However Ayr were back in it with a goal before the interval and an equaliser early in the second half. And it was the visitors who snatched the win and the points with a late goal to secure a 3–2 win.

The defeat brought Dumbarton’s 100% league record to an end and dropped them to 2nd in the league with 8 points from 5 games – 2 behind Abercorn.

=== October ===
On 4 October Dumbarton travelled to Coatbridge to play Albion Rovers in their first league fixture of the season. Hill returned from injury at outside left, while Stevenson replaced McLean at centre half. In addition William Black (ex Everton) played at left back. At first it looked like the changes had unsettled the Sons as the Rovers raced to a 3–0 lead and held this with just 15 minutes to go. However Dumbarton fought back and managed to level the scores and take a valuable point.

Next up was St Bernards at Boghead in the league. Thomson returned at left back in an otherwise unchanged team. The Sons led by a goal to nil at the interval and five minutes into the second half added another. Before full time Dumbarton scored a further two goals to win comfortably by 4–0.

East Stirling were the visitors to Boghead on 18 October for their first league fixture. An unchanged side took to the field but despite playing well found it difficult to beat the Shire defence, The visitors led by a goal at the interval but the Sons equalised five minutes into the second half. Once again East Stirling took the lead 10 minutes from the end from a breakaway – but right on full time Hill scored to rescue a point in a 2–2 draw.

A week later, Dumbarton travelled to play their return fixture at Arthurlie. There was only one change to the previous week’s side with Ritchie displacing Stevenson at centre half. Once again the Sons came up against a goalkeeper in excellent form and despite a number of missed chances the game finished 0–0.

So as October came to a close Dumbarton had regained the lead in the Second Division table with 13 points from the 9 games played, 3 ahead of Abercorn who had 3 games in hand.

=== November ===
On 2 November Dumbarton had neighbours Vale of Leven at Boghead for their return league match. The Sons had won the away fixture in August but a week later the Vale had gained revenge in the Qualifying Cup tie. With the absence of Fraser, Taylor went into the match between the sticks and it was Vale of Leven that had the best of the play up till the interval crossing over a goal to the good. In the second half however there was only one team in it as a Brander hat trick helped Dumbarton to a 4–1 win. Subsequently the club lost the two points earned due to an apparent registration error.

The next week it was a trip to the capital to play Leith Athletic in the league. The home fixture in August was won by Dumbarton in a close game and they went into the game hopeful of a repeat with an unchanged side apart from Fraser who returned to his place in goals. The sides reached half time with Dumbarton just shading the proceedings 2–1. However due to injury Leith had to play the whole second half a man down and this proved to be a fatal handicap as the Sons scored a further two goals with Leith getting a consolation score at the final whistle – the game ending 4–2 in favour of Dumbarton.

Close challengers Abercorn were next to appear at Boghead for league duty. The team was unchanged and in a match spoiled by dreadful weather conditions Dumbarton managed a creditable 2–1 win.

On 23 November Dumbarton travelled to Falkirk to play East Stirling in the return league fixture. The game at Boghead a month earlier had finished level and another close contest was expected. The Sons freshened up the front line with Hill coming in from the left wing to spearhead the attack with Taylor taking his place – in addition Gordon replaced Teasdale at inside left. The game started with Dumbarton playing well and it wasn’t long before Taylor scored the opener. The home side lost a full back to injury and the Sons tried everything to take advantage – having two goals disallowed for offside. After half time, the Shire were restored to full strength, and made Dumbarton pay for their missed opportunities as they scored twice to win 2–1.

On the last day of the month Ayr Parkhouse were the league opponents at Boghead. Grant replaced Kane at left half and the Sons started off strongly scoring from a penalty after three minutes. However despite play switching from one end to the other no other scoring took place and Dumbarton took both points.

So at the end of November Dumbarton had surrendered top place to Ayr in the league – a point behind with 19 points from 14 games.

=== December ===
Dumbarton travelled to Fife to play their return league fixture against Cowdenbeath on 4 December. The Sons team showed two changes with McLean coming in for Grant at left half and Teasdale for Taylor on the left wing. Dumbarton had got the better of the home tie in September but in this game they found Cowdenbeath to be in excellent form and as time was called the home team had secured a comfortable 3–1 victory.

A week later Dumbarton were on the road again this time to Ayr to play Parkhouse. The team went through a pack reshuffle with Ritchie switching from centre half to lead the attack. Hill took over on the left wing and Teasdale moved inside to replace Gordon. In addition Stevenson took the centre half spot with Kane taking over McLean’s position at left half. A fortnight earlier the Sons had scrambled a win in the home fixture and the pace of this game was no different with both defences being pressed by waves of attacks. Parkhouse scored early with Dumbarton equalising soon thereafter, but before the interval the home side regained the lead. A further Parkhouse goal minutes into the second half did not bring the Sons efforts to an end. However a missed penalty kick was the closest that Dumbarton came and Ayr Parkhouse took both points with a 3–1 win.

On 18 December Dumbarton stayed in Ayr for the return league fixture against the league leaders. The Honest Men had taken the Boghead tie in September but the Sons were anxious not to extend their winless run. David Blair (ex Dumbarton Harp) was introduced in goal, while Ritchie resumed at centre half, Gordon took over at centre forward and Taylor took Hill’s place on the left wing. In a fast and exciting game Dumbarton took the lead in the first half and while United equalised soon after the interval, the Sons responded with a winner to take the tie 2–1.

The final game of the year took place at Boghead against Albion Rovers in the leaguie. The only change to the team was Hill replacing Gordon at centre forward. Dumbarton found the Rovers keeper in fantastic form with every attack being repelled. The Coatbridge men scored in the first half against the run of play but it was not until near the final whistle that the Sons found a way past the Albion defence – the result being a 1–1 draw.

So as 1907 came to an end Ayr and Dumbarton topped the league both with 22 points from 14 games played.

=== January ===
On 4 January Dumbarton played their return league fixture in Fife against Raith Rovers. The Sons introduced a local junior Peter Stewart on the left wing. The Kirkcaldy side had recently been climbing the table and a close encounter was expected. The first goal went to the visitors as a defensive clearance struck new boy Stewart and went into the goal. From then on the Rovers settled down to take control and equalised before half time. Dumbarton lost Thomson to injury in the second half and Raith took advantage scoring early in the second half. Blair also saved a penalty but the 10 men Sons were unable to save the game – losing 2–1.

This season saw the introduction of a new competition for those clubs that had lost in the first round of the Qualifying Cup – and on 11 January Dumbarton were drawn at home to play 2nd Kings Own Scottish Borderers in the first round of the Consolation Cup. Gordon replaced the injured Thomson in defence and Robert Nisbet (ex Queens Park) started at centre forward. In addition Hill took Stewart’s place on the wing. On the day the Sons were never seriously pressed and ran out easy 6–0 victors.

A week later Dumbarton travelled to play St Bernards in the league. Hill and Nisbet (under the pseudo name ‘Scott’) switched positions with Teasdale returning at inside left. The game at Boghead in October had been a walk over for the Sons but on this occasion the teams were well matched and while the Saints scored first Dumbarton levelled up matters. No more goals were notched and the game finished 1–1.

On 25 January an unchanged side took the field at Boghead to play the second round of the Consolation Cup against Beith. Dumbarton scored within three minutes of the start and controlled the match from start to finish, although only one more goal was scored for a 2–0 win.

=== February ===
On 1 February Dumbarton played their penultimate league fixture against Abercorn at Paisley. The Sons were still in with a chance of the title and while Abercorn’s aspirations were gone, the leaders Ayr were on cup duty meaning that a win would put Dumbarton on top. The team was again unchanged and took to the field were under foot conditions were treacherous. Hill was quick to put Dumbarton ahead though the home side equalised before half time. However in the second half the Sons attack excelled and scored three times for a 4–2 win and thus regained the league lead.

A week later Dumbarton travelled to Angus to play Lochee United in the third round of the Consolation Cup. Kane replaced Taylor in the half back line, who moved to inside left instead of Teasdale. The game itself was a fast and exciting affair with the Sons taking the lead, then Lochee coming back to go ahead before Dumbarton finally scored two goals to gain the win by 3–2.

On 15 February Dumbarton began their county cup campaign. The competition had been expanded by the addition of Dumbarton Harp and it was the new boys that were up first at Meadow Park. Taylor was back in at right half while Teasdale returned to the front line. The match was always a close struggle and it wasn’t until 15 minutes from the end that Brander managed to break the deadlock for a 1–0 win.

A week later Dumbarton welcomed Broxburn to Boghead to play in the fourth round of the Consolation Cup. Unfortunately a hailstorm hit the game with fifteen minutes left to play and the Sons leading 2–1. So on 29 February Broxburn returned to hopefully play out the fixture. Matt Houston of Queens Park was slotted in at centre half while the attack was given a shuffle including Taylor replacing Brander at inside right. The close game a week previously was not repeated with Dumbarton controlling the game throughout. Two goals in the first half were followed by four more before full time for a comprehensive 6–0 win.

=== March ===
On 7 March the county anticipated a great match as Dumbarton and their nearest neighbours Dumbarton Harp played off in the quarter-final of the Consolation Cup at Boghead. A number of changes were made to the team, with Fraser coming back in goal, Taylor switching to the half back line in place of O’Neill and Brander taking Taylor’s place at inside left. The Sons played strongly and were two ahead at the interval. Hill got a third (and his second) in the second half, and despite a penalty miss from each team the tie ended in a 3–0 victory for Dumbarton.

A week later Dumbarton played their final league fixture against Raith Rovers at Boghead. Raith were well placed to take the title due to the number of games they had in hand, but Dumbarton just had to win to stake their claim should Raith falter. The team was unchanged and while they were second best for much of the first half with Raith opening the score, Brander then Nisbet scored before the interval for a 2–1 lead. In the second half Dumbarton came more into it and Nisbet scored again for a 3–1 win. This result sent Dumbarton back to the top with 27 points from their 22 games, a point ahead of Ayr with a game in hand, but more ominously Raith in fourth with 22 points from 17 games – it was now a waiting game.

It was a return to county cup business on 21 March as Renton visited Boghead. The Dumbarton team showed one change with O’Neill coming in at outside right in place of Brander. The Sons were strong favourites for this tie but Renton were not going to lie down. In a fast and exciting match both teams played attacking football but the defences stood firm. Brander ‘scored’ just before the end but it was disallowed as the Renton keeper was lying disabled. The final result was a no score draw.

The county cup was the order of the day the following week as the return fixture against Dumbarton Harp was played at Boghead. Duncan returned on the right wing of an otherwise unchanged side. In miserable conditions Dumbarton were two up by the interval from a couple of own goals, Gordon and Duncan scored in the second half for what was a comfortable 4–1 win. As it was this was Duncan’s final game for the Sons as he signed for Newcastle United after the game,

=== April ===
On 4 April Dumbarton travelled to Methil to play the semi-final of the Consolation Cup. With the loss of Duncan there was only one change to the team with the introduction of James Sommen from Partick Thistle on the left wing, and Hill switching to the opposite wing. Whether it was from the four ties that East Fife had played during the week to dispose of Brechin City, but the game was controlled by Dumbarton with a goal scored in each half for a 2–0 win.

A week later Dumbarton travelled to play Vale of Leven at Millburn Park in the county cup. An unchanged side (other than Hill and Sommen switching wings) took to the field. Vale were the first to show their skills and after 10 minutes were a goal ahead, which they maintained till the interval. The Sons improved in the second half and managed to score an equaliser, thus ending the game in a 1–1 draw. On the same day the news came that Raith had finally overtaken Dumbarton at the top of the Second Division and therefore the Sons finished as runners up.

The return county cup tie against Renton was played at Tontine Park on 18 April. Once again there were no changes to the squad. Renton began strongly and were quickly two goals to the good, although Ritchie scored from the penalty spot to reduce the arrears before half time. Early in the second half Sommen scored the equaliser and despite losing Kane to injury the 10 men held on for a 2–2 draw.

Three days later Vale of Leven visited Boghead to play the final qualifying tie in the county cup competition. A number of positional changes were made to accommodate the loss of injured Kane with O’Neill coming into the half back line and Thomson returning at left back. The game was an exciting one but it was Dumbarton that were in scoring form with Hill taking a brace and Gordon the other in a 3–0 win. The result meant that Dumbarton would meet Renton in the final.

On 25 April Dumbarton played their first national final for 11 years as they met Alloa Athletic at Falkirk in the decider for the inaugural Consolation Cup. Both teams entered the tie with strong teams and after an exciting first half the scores were level at 0–0. Early in the second half Ritchie dislocated his shoulder and had to leave the field and the 10 men fought on until 10 minutes from the end when Alloa scored two quick fire goals to take the trophy in a 2–0 victory.

The final game of the season took place at Millburn Park for the final of the Dumbartonshire Cup against Renton on 29 April. It may have been the case that playing 4 games in 10 days was just too much but on the day the Sons never played as they can and in the end lost out 2–0.

=== May ===
The top four clubs in the Second Division went into the election along with the two clubs that had finished in the bottom places of the 'top fight' for First Division places next season. As it was the status quo was retained – results as follows:

Team	Votes	Result
Clyde	12	Re-elected to First Division
Port Glasgow Athletic	9	Re-elected to First Division
Raith Rovers	8	Not promoted to First Division
Dumbarton	2	Not promoted to First Division
Abercorn	1	Not promoted to First Division
Ayr	0	Not promoted to First Division

== Match results ==
=== Scottish League ===
17 August 1907 Scottish League	Dumbarton	2–1	Leith Athletic	Boghead Park
	Brander 30'; Hill 75'		McCulloch 25'	Attendance: 2,000; Referee: Mr Gillespie

24 August 1907 Scottish League	Dumbarton	6–2	Arthurlie	Boghead Park
	Hill 1'; Brander 10'; Taylor 40'; O'Neill		Hughes	Attendance: 3,000; Referee: J Matthews

31 August 1907 Scottish League	Vale of Leven	0–1	Dumbarton	Millburn Park
			Taylor 30'	Attendance: 3,000; Referee: W Goldie

14 September 1907 Scottish League	Dumbarton	3–1	Cowdenbeath	Boghead Park
	Brander 30', 40'; Strang 85'		Ferguson	Attendance: 2,000; Referee: Mr Martin

28 September 1907 Scottish League	Dumbarton	2–3	Ayr	Boghead Park
	Kane 10'; Brander 14'		Goodman Forrest	Attendance: 2,000; Referee: Mr Riddell

5 October 1907 Scottish League	Albion Rovers	3–3	Dumbarton	Meadow Park, Coatbridge
	Donald 20'; Morrison; Ralston		Stevenson 75' (pen.); Hill 77'; Brander 79'	Referee: Mr Smith

12 October 1907 Scottish League	Dumbarton	4–0	St Bernard's	Boghead Park
	Teasdale; Gordon 50', 60'; Brander 90'			Attendance: 2,000; Referee: Mr Deans

19 October 1907 Scottish League	Dumbarton	2–2	E Stirling	Boghead Park
	Brander 50'; Hill 90'		Thomson (o.g.); Taggart 80'	Attendance: 2,000; Referee: Mr McKnight

26 October 1907 Scottish League	Arthurlie	0–0	Dumbarton	Dunterlie Park (1906–1919)
				Referee: W Montgomerie

2 November 1907 Scottish League	Dumbarton	4–1	Vale of Leven	Boghead Park
	Hill; Brander		Anderson	Attendance: 5,000; Referee: J Hatcher

9 November 1907 Scottish League	Leith Athletic	2–4	Dumbarton	Old Logie Green
	Moffat		Duncan; Gordon; Hill	Attendance: 1,000

16 November 1907 Scottish League	Dumbarton	2–1	Abercorn	Boghead Park
	Hill 23', 80'		Reid	Attendance: 1,500; Referee: G Hamilton

23 November 1907 Scottish League	E Stirling	2–1	Dumbarton	Merchiston Park
	Henderson; McTaggart 75'		Taylor	Attendance: 2,000; Referee: W Smith

30 November 1907 Scottish League	Dumbarton	1–0	Ayr Parkhouse	Boghead Park
	Hill 3' (pen.)			Attendance: 2,000; Referee: Mr Rennie

7 December 1907 Scottish League	Cowdenbeath	3–1	Dumbarton	North End Park, Cowdenbeath
	Ferguson; Gourlay		Hill

14 December 1907 Scottish League	Ayr Parkhouse	3–1	Dumbarton	Beresford Park
	Skillen; Cameron; Lynch		Ritchie

21 December 1907 Scottish League	Ayr	1–2	Dumbarton	Somerset Park
	Forrest 50'		Taylor 25'; Mason (o.g.)

28 December 1907 Scottish League	Dumbarton	1–1	Albion Rovers	Boghead Park
	Hill 75'		Cairns	Attendance: 1,500; Referee: A Graham

4 January 1908 Scottish League	Raith Rovers	2–1	Dumbarton	Starks Park
	Gourlay; Axford		Stewart	Attendance: 2,500

18 January 1908 Scottish League	St Bernard's	1–1	Dumbarton	Royal Gymnasium Ground
	Tennant		Duncan	Referee: Mr Dougray

1 February 1908 Scottish League	Abercorn	2–4	Dumbarton	Old Ralston Park
	Curran; Hunter (pen.)		Hill; Teasdale; Ritchie (pen.); Taylor	Attendance: 1,500; Referee: Mr Dudgeon

14 March 1908 Scottish League	Dumbarton	3–1	Raith Rovers	Boghead Park
	Brander 33'; Nisbet		Gourlay 7'	Attendance: 2,500; Referee: Mr Montgomerie

=== Scottish Qualifying Cup ===
7 September 1907 QualifyCup R1	Vale of Leven	2–1	Dumbarton	Millburn Park
	McAlpine 44'; McCallum		Taylor 20'	Attendance: 3,000; Referee: J Muir

=== Scottish Consolation Cup ===
11 January 1908 ConsolCup R1	Dumbarton	6–0	2nd KOSB	Boghead Park
	Gordon; Nisbet; Brander; Hill

25 January 1908 ConsolCup R2	Dumbarton	2–0	Beith	Boghead Park
	Duncan; Nisbet			Attendance: 1,000

8 February 1908 ConsolCup R3	Lochee United	2–3	Dumbarton	St Margaret's Park, Dundee
	Burns; Noble		Nisbet; Duncan; Taylor	Attendance: 1,800

29 February 1908 ConsolCup R4	Dumbarton	6–0	Broxburn	Boghead Park
	Taylor 15'; Nisbet; Duncan; Teasdale			Attendance: 2,000; Referee: J Matthews

7 March 1908 ConsolCup R5	Dumbarton	3–0	Dumbarton Harp	Boghead Park
	Hill; Brander			Attendance: 3,000; Referee: J Stark

4 April 1908 ConsolCup Semifinal	East Fife	1–3	Dumbarton	Bayview Park, Methil
	Horne		Brander 3'; Nisbet; Sommen 85'	Referee: Mr Riddell

25 April 1908 ConsolCup Final	Alloa	2–0	Dumbarton	Brockville Park
	Young; Cairns			Attendance: 5,000; Referee: B Riddell

=== Dumbartonshire Cup ===
15 February 1908 League	Dumbarton Harp	0–1	Dumbarton	Meadow Park, Dumbarton
			Brander 75'	Attendance: 3,000; Referee: J Penman

21 March 1908 League	Dumbarton	0–0	Renton	Boghead Park
				Referee: J Matthews

28 March 1908 League	Dumbarton	4–1	Dumbarton Harp	Boghead Park
	Arthur 25' (o.g.); McCulloch (o.g.); Brander; Duncan		Watters	Attendance: 1,500; Referee: Mr Ross

11 April 1908 League	Vale of Leven	1–1	Dumbarton	Millburn Park
	Finlayson		Hill 60'	Attendance: 2,000; Referee: Mr Montgomery

18 April 1908 League	Renton	2–2	Dumbarton	Tontine Park
	McLaughlin 16'; Travers 26'		Ritchie; Sommers 16'	Attendance: 3,000; Referee: J Stark

21 April 1908 League	Dumbarton	3–0	Vale of Leven	Boghead Park
	Hill; Gordon			Attendance: 2,000; Referee: Mr Downs

29 April 1908 Final	Dumbarton	0–2	Renton	Millburn Park
			Travers; McLaughlin	Attendance: 4,000

==== Final league table ====
Pos	Team	Pld	W	D	L	GF	GA	GD	Pts
1	Raith Rovers (C)	22	14	2	6	37	23	+14	30
2	Ayr	22	11	5	6	40	33	+7	27
2	Dumbarton	22	12	5	5	49	32	+17	27 (Note: Dumbarton were docked two points for fielding an ineligible player.)
4	Abercorn	22	9	5	8	33	30	+3	23
4	East Stirlingshire	22	9	5	8	30	32	−2	23

Source: statto.com
Rules for classification: Teams finish equal if level on points. Points system: 2 points for a win, 1 point for a draw, 0 points for a loss
(C) Champions

=== Friendlies ===
15 August 1907 Friendly	Dumbarton	4–1	Queen's Park	Boghead Park
	Taylor 1' 46'; Gordon		Stevenson	Referee: A Jackson

21 September 1907 Friendly	Wishaw Thistle	1–2	Dumbarton	Recreation Park, Wishaw
	}		Goal

== Player statistics ==
No.	Pos	Nat	Player	Total		Second Division		Qualifying Cup		Consolation Cup	
No.	Pos	Nat	Player	Apps	Goals	Apps	Goals	Apps	Goals	Apps	Goals
	GK	(Scotland) SCO	David Blair	9	0	5	0	0	0	4	0
	GK	(Scotland) SCO	Alexander Fraser	20	0	16	0	1	0	3	0
	DF	(Scotland) SCO	William Black	1	0	1	0	0	0	0	0
	DF	(Scotland) SCO	Alex McCulloch	30	0	22	0	1	0	7	0
	DF	(Scotland) SCO	Robert Thomson	19	0	18	0	1	0	0	0
	MF	(Scotland) SCO	Charles Grant	1	0	1	0	0	0	0	0
	MF	(Scotland) SCO	Matt Houston	1	0	0	0	0	0	1	0
	MF	(Scotland) SCO	Edward Kane	19	1	15	1	0	0	4	0
	MF	(Scotland) SCO	Bob McLean	9	0	6	0	0	0	3	0
	MF	(Scotland) SCO	Charles O'Neill	22	1	19	1	1	0	2	0
	MF	(Scotland) SCO	James Stevenson	8	1	7	1	1	0	0	0
	FW	(Scotland) SCO	John Brander	29	14	22	11	1	0	6	3
	FW	(Scotland) SCO	Scott Duncan	27	5	21	2	1	0	5	3
	FW	(Scotland) SCO	Bob Gordon	27	5	19	3	1	0	7	2
	FW	(Scotland) SCO	Johnny Hill	26	16	19	13	0	0	7	3
	FW	(Scotland) SCO	Robert Nisbet	10	9	3	2	0	0	7	7
	FW	(Scotland) SCO	George Ritchie	20	2	14	2	0	0	6	0
	FW	(Scotland) SCO	James Sommen	2	1	0	0	0	0	2	1
	FW	(Scotland) SCO	Peter Stewart	2	1	1	1	0	0	1	0
	FW	(Scotland) SCO	William Strang	3	1	2	1	1	0	0	0
	FW	(Scotland) SCO	Peter Taylor	21	11	13	8	1	1	7	2
	FW	(Scotland) SCO	Matt Teasdale	24	3	18	2	1	0	5	1

=== Transfers ===
==== Players in ====
Player	From	Date
(Scotland) Robert Thomson	(Scotland) Hearts (loan)	15 Aug 1907
(Scotland) Bob McLean	(England) Newcastle United	17 Aug 1907
(Scotland) William Black	(England) Everton	24 Aug 1907
(Scotland) Robert Thomson	(Scotland) East Stirling (trialist)	26 Aug 1907
(Scotland) David Blair	(Scotland) Dumbarton Harp	23 Nov 1907
(Scotland) Peter Stewart	(Scotland) Trialist	21 Dec 1907
(Scotland) Robert Nisbet	(Scotland) Queen's Park	15 Jan 1908
(Scotland) Matt Houston	(Scotland) Queen's Park (trialist)	29 Feb 1908
(Scotland) James Sommen	(Scotland) Partick Thistle (loan)	Apr 1908

==== Players out ====
Player	To	Date
(Scotland) William Robertson	(Scotland) Vale of Leven	Jul 1907
(Scotland) John Hope	(Scotland) Queen's Park	2 Aug 1907
(Scotland) William Black	(Scotland) Hamilton	22 Feb 1908
(Scotland) Scott Duncan	(England) Newcastle United	1 March 1908

In addition William Blair, Charles Grant and Harry Mitchell played their final 'first XI' games in Dumbarton colours.
