= Robert McLean =

Robert McLean may refer to:

- Robert McLean (minister) (1846–1926, American Presbyterian minister and legislator
- Robert McLean (engineer) (1884–1964), Scottish industrialist
- Robert McLean (footballer) (1884–1936), Scottish professional footballer
- Douglas Maclean (1852–1929), also known as Sir Robert Donald Douglas Maclean, New Zealand MP and farmer

== See also ==
- Bob McLean (disambiguation)
- Robert MacLean (disambiguation)
