= 1911–12 Dumbarton F.C. season =

Dumbarton
1911–1912 season
- Stadium: Boghead Park, Dumbarton
- Scottish League Division Two: 3rd
- Scottish Cup: First Round
- Top goalscorer: League: John Rowan (11); All: Hill/Speedie/Potter (12)

The 1911–12 season was the 35th Scottish football season in which Dumbarton competed at national level, entering the Scottish Football League, the Scottish Cup and the Scottish Qualifying Cup.

== Scottish League ==
Dumbarton were unable to maintain a bright start to their sixth successive Second Division campaign but finished 3rd with 27 points, 8 behind champions Ayr United.

At the end of the season there were no applicants from the Second Division for promotion. It had however been agreed that the bottom First Division club - St Mirren - would be replaced by the Second Division champions - Ayr United – but in the end for financial reasons this did not take place.

| 19 August 1911 Scottish League | Dumbarton | 3–0 | St Bernard's | Boghead Park |
| | Menzies 25'; Speedie 65', 89' | | | Attendance: 3,000; Referee: Sgt Vick |

| 26 August 1911 Scottish League | Vale of Leven | 2–4 | Dumbarton | Millburn Park |
| | Kaye 20'; Peacock | | Menzies 40'; Rowan 65'; MacPherson 70'; Hill 85' | Attendance: 3,000; Referee: Mr McBeth |

| 9 September 1911 Scottish League | Dumbarton | 2–0 | Cowdenbeath | Boghead Park |
| | MacPherson 5'; Rowan 45' | | | Attendance: 3,000; Referee: S Feggans |

| 23 September 1911 Scottish League | Arthurlie | 4–2 | Dumbarton | Dunterlie Park (1906–1919) |
| | Love; Wilkinson; Stevenson (pen.) | | Menzies 45'; Sellars (OG) | Referee: S Adams |

| 30 September 1911 Scottish League | Dumbarton | 1–5 | Abercorn | Boghead Park |
| | Brown | | Horn 5', 60'; Muirhead 20' (OG); Speirs, R Speirs, J | Attendance: 2,000 |

| 14 October 1911 Scottish League | Leith Athletic | 2–2 | Dumbarton | Old Logie Green |
| | Paterson; Bowman 89' | | MacPherson 4'; Rowan 5' | Attendance: 2,000; Referee: Mr Millar |

| 21 October 1911 Scottish League | Abercorn | 2–1 | Dumbarton | New Ralston Park |
| | Speirs; Curran 89' | | Ferguson |

| 4 November 1911 Scottish League | St Johnstone | 0–1 | Dumbarton | Recreation Grounds (Perth) |
| | | | Hill |

| 2 December 1911 Scottish League | Ayr United | 2–1 | Dumbarton | Somerset Park |
| | Phillips; Goodwin | | Brander | Referee: A Edwards |

| 9 December 1911 Scottish League | Dumbarton | 1–0 | Arthurlie | Boghead Park |
| | Speedie 87' (pen.) | | | Attendance: 2,000 |

| 16 December 1911 Scottish League | Dumbarton | 2–0 | Vale of Leven | Boghead Park |
| | Speedie; Rowan | | | Attendance: 3,000; Referee: J McKnight |

| 23 December 1911 Scottish League | St Bernard's | 2–1 | Dumbarton | Royal Gymnasium Ground |
| | Henderson; Ferguson | | Hill | Attendance: 3,000; Referee: T Dryburgh |

| 30 December 1911 Scottish League | Dumbarton | 2–0 | Albion Rovers | Boghead Park |
| | McGillivray 40' | | | Referee: J Aitken |

| 2 January 1912 Scottish League | Dumbarton | 1–0 | Dundee Hibs | Boghead Park |
| | Speedie 80' | | | Attendance: 3,000 |

| 6 January 1912 Scottish League | Cowdenbeath | 0–3 | Dumbarton | North End Park, Cowdenbeath |
| | | | Hill; Brander; Speedie |

| 13 January 1912 Scottish League | Dumbarton | 5–2 | Leith Athletic | Boghead Park |
| | Hendry; Hamill; Speedie 60' | | Paterson 65' | Attendance: 2,000 |

| 27 January 1912 Scottish League | Dumbarton | 2–1 | E Stirling | Boghead Park |
| | Rowan; Robertson 60' | | Thomson | Attendance: 3,000; Referee: D Liddell |

| 10 February 1912 Scottish League | Dumbarton | 6–1 | Ayr United | Boghead Park |
| | Hill 50'; Rowan; Brander | | Black (pen.) | Referee: C Johnstone |

| 17 February 1912 Scottish League | Dundee Hibs | 4–2 | Dumbarton | Tannadice Park |
| | Gibson; Linn | | Speedie 45' (pen.); Brander | Attendance: 2,500; Referee: A Edwards |

| 24 February 1912 Scottish League | Dumbarton | 4–1 | St Johnstone | Boghead Park |
| | McGillivray 45'; Hill (OG) | | Brown | Referee: A McBeth |

| 2 March 1912 Scottish League | Albion Rovers | 2–1 | Dumbarton | Meadow Park, Coatbridge |
| | Plunkett | | Rowan | Referee: J McKnight |

| 9 March 1912 Scottish League | E Stirling | 1–0 | Dumbarton | Merchiston Park |
| | Martin | | | Attendance: 2,000; Referee: J Pettigrew |

== Scottish Cup ==
Qualification for the Scottish Cup was successful, however Dumbarton lost out in the first round to East Stirling.

| 20 January 1912 Cup R1 | E Stirling | 3–0 | Dumbarton | Merchiston Park |
| | 1' (OG); Robertson | | | Attendance: 4,000; Referee: J Muir |

== Scottish Qualifying Cup ==
Dumbarton reached the final of the Scottish Qualifying Cup before losing to Dunfermline Athletic.

| 16 September 1911 QualifyCup R2 | Dumbarton | 1–0 | Port Glasgow | Boghead Park |
| | Hill 35' | | | Referee: A Edwards |

| 7 October 1911 QualifyCup R3 | Galston | 2–3 | Dumbarton | Riverside Park, Galston |
| | Morrison 10'; Mair 50' | | MacPherson 25', 90'; Hill 75' | Attendance: 3,000; Referee: Mr Murray |

| 28 October 1911 QualifyCup R4 | Dumbarton | 5–0 | Renton | Boghead Park |
| | MacPherson 2'; Hill | | | Attendance: 5,000; Referee: A Allan |

| 11 November 1911 QualifyCup R5 | Dumbarton | 4–1 | E Stirling | Boghead Park |
| | Rowan; MacPherson; Speedie | | Thomson | Attendance: 5,000; Referee: J Muir |

| 18 November 1911 QualifyCup SF | Dumbarton | 4–1 | Ayr United | Boghead Park |
| | Speedie (pen.) (pen.) (pen.); Hill 50' | | Phillips | Attendance: 6,000; Referee: J Bell |

| 25 November 1911 QualifyCup Final | Dumbarton | 0–1 | Dunfermline Athletic | Gymnasium Grounds, Edinburgh |
| | | | Gibson 70' | Attendance: 9,000; Referee: J Bell |

== Friendlies/Other Matches ==
During the season 8 'friendly' matches were played, including a 'benefit' game for Herbert MacPherson whose bright career was ended by a leg break in the New Year game against Dundee Hibs. In all, 6 were won, 1 drawn and 1 lost, scoring 17 goals and conceding 5.

| 15 August 1911 Friendly | Dumbarton | 3–0 | Vale of Leven | Boghead Park |
| | Brander; Hill | | | Attendance: 2,000 |

| 16 March 1912 Friendly | Dumbarton | 2–1 | Abercorn | Boghead Park |
| | Hill 29'; Potter 88' | | Curran 25' | Attendance: 2,000 |

| 30 March 1912 Friendly | Dumbarton | 3–1 | Motherwell | Boghead Park |
| | Hill 20'; Rowan 25'; Haggerty | | Watson 45' | Attendance: 2,000; Referee: Mr Stark |

| 6 April 1912 Friendly | Dumbarton | 3–0 | Raith Rovers | Boghead Park |
| | Speedie 26', 49'; Hamill 85' | | | Referee: A Edwards |

| 13 April 1912 Friendly | Dumbarton | 3–0 | Third Lanark | Boghead Park |
| | Speedie 20'; Rowan 75', 80' | | | Referee: A Johnstone |

| 17 April 1912 Friendly | Dumbarton | 1–2 | Queen's Park | Boghead Park |
| | Rowan | | Goal | Attendance: 2,500 |

| 20 April 1912 Benefit | Dumbarton | 1–2 | Glasgow Perthshire | Boghead Park |
| | Potter; Hill | | Goal |

| 27 April 1912 Friendly | Dumbarton | 0–0 | Hamilton | Boghead Park |
| | | | | Attendance: 1,000 |

== Player statistics ==
=== Squad ===
| No. | Pos | Nat | Player | Total | | Second Division | | Scottish Cup | | Qualifying Cup | |
| No. | Pos | Nat | Player | Apps | Goals | Apps | Goals | Apps | Goals | Apps | Goals |
|---|---|---|---|---|---|---|---|---|---|---|---|
| | GK | (Scotland) SCO | John B Miller | 10 | 0 | 9 | 0 | 0 | 0 | 1 | 0 |
| | GK | (Scotland) SCO | Willie Muir | 8 | 0 | 5 | 0 | 1 | 0 | 2 | 0 |
| | GK | (Scotland) SCO | Hugh Wallace | 11 | 0 | 8 | 0 | 0 | 0 | 3 | 0 |
| | DF | (Scotland) SCO | Andrew Cochrane | 20 | 0 | 14 | 0 | 1 | 0 | 5 | 0 |
| | DF | (Scotland) SCO | Willie Lithgow | 21 | 0 | 17 | 0 | 1 | 0 | 3 | 0 |
| | DF | (Scotland) SCO | Robert Muirhead | 22 | 0 | 16 | 0 | 1 | 0 | 5 | 0 |
| | MF | (Scotland) SCO | George Fyfe | 5 | 0 | 5 | 0 | 0 | 0 | 0 | 0 |
| | MF | (Scotland) SCO | Matthew Haggerty | 24 | 0 | 18 | 0 | 1 | 0 | 5 | 0 |
| | MF | (Scotland) SCO | Andrew Potter | 27 | 1 | 20 | 0 | 1 | 0 | 6 | 1 |
| | MF | (Scotland) SCO | William Wilson | 3 | 0 | 3 | 0 | 0 | 0 | 0 | 0 |
| | FW | (Scotland) SCO | John Brander | 12 | 4 | 10 | 4 | 1 | 0 | 1 | 0 |
| | FW | (Scotland) SCO | William Brown | 3 | 1 | 3 | 1 | 0 | 0 | 0 | 0 |
| | FW | (Scotland) SCO | James Ferguson | 21 | 1 | 15 | 1 | 1 | 0 | 5 | 0 |
| | FW | (Scotland) SCO | David Hamill | 6 | 3 | 6 | 3 | 0 | 0 | 0 | 0 |
| | FW | (Scotland) SCO | Samuel Hendry | 21 | 1 | 15 | 1 | 0 | 0 | 6 | 0 |
| | FW | (Scotland) SCO | Johnny Hill | 25 | 12 | 18 | 7 | 1 | 0 | 6 | 5 |
| | FW | (Scotland) SCO | Herbert MacPherson | 18 | 9 | 12 | 3 | 0 | 0 | 6 | 6 |
| | FW | (Scotland) SCO | Alex McGillivray | 7 | 4 | 7 | 4 | 0 | 0 | 0 | 0 |
| | FW | (Scotland) SCO | Alex Menzies | 4 | 3 | 4 | 3 | 0 | 0 | 0 | 0 |
| | FW | (Scotland) SCO | Andy Robertson | 2 | 1 | 1 | 1 | 1 | 0 | 0 | 0 |
| | FW | (Scotland) SCO | John Rowan | 23 | 11 | 17 | 9 | 0 | 0 | 6 | 2 |
| | FW | (Scotland) SCO | Finlay Speedie | 26 | 12 | 19 | 8 | 1 | 0 | 6 | 4 |

=== Transfers ===
==== Players in ====
| Player | From | Date |
|---|---|---|
| (Scotland) George Fyfe | (Scotland) Dundee Hibs | 29 Jul 1911 |
| (Scotland) Matthew Haggerty | (Scotland) Vale of Leven | 3 Aug 1911 |
| (Scotland) William Brown | (Scotland) Holytown United | 16 Sep 1911 |
| (Scotland) James Ferguson | (Scotland) Cowdenbeath | 29 Sep 1911 |
| (Scotland) John B Miller | | 14 Nov 1911 |
| (Scotland) Willie Muir | (Scotland) Hearts | 30 Nov 1911 |
| (Scotland) Alex McGillivray | | 5 Dec 1911 |
| (Scotland) Charles Keir | (Scotland) Armadale | 11 Jan 1912 |
| (Scotland) Andy Robertson | (Scotland) Howwood | 18 Jan 1912 |
| (Scotland) William Wilson | (Scotland) Helensburgh | 17 Feb 1912 |
| (Scotland) Jack Brown | (Scotland) Maryhill | 20 Apr 1912 |

==== Players out ====
| Player | To | Date |
|---|---|---|
| (Scotland) David Hynds | (Scotland) Vale of Leven | 6 Jun 1911 |
| (Scotland) John McNee | (Scotland) Vale of Leven | 2 Aug 1911 |
| (Scotland) Hugh Wallace | (England) Bradford PA | 1 Nov 1911 |
| (Scotland) George Fyfe | (Scotland) Dundee Hibs | 1 Dec 1911 |
| (Scotland) John Brander | (Scotland) Dumbarton Harp | 10 May 1912 |
| (Scotland) Matthew Haggerty | (Scotland) Third Lanark | 29 May 1912 |
| (Scotland) Johnny Hill | (Scotland) Dumbarton Harp | |
| (Scotland) Herbert MacPherson | (Scotland) Retired | |

In addition David Cochrane, David Hamill, Alex Menzies, William Muir and William Wilson all played their final 'first XI' games in Dumbarton colours.
