= 1906–07 Dumbarton F.C. season =

Dumbarton
1906–1907 season
- Stadium: Boghead Park, Dumbarton
- Scottish League Division Two: 4th
- Top goalscorer: League: Hill/Hope (9); All: Hill/Hope (9)

The 1906–07 season was the 30th Scottish football season in which Dumbarton competed at national level, entering the Scottish Football League and the Scottish Qualifying Cup. In addition Dumbarton played in the Dumbartonshire Cup.

== Story of the season ==
=== August ===
The season opener was played at Boghead in a friendly against a strong Queen's Park side on 15 August. The Sons were at full strength and included their two new signings. Proceedings commenced with the unfurling of the Combination championship flag won last season. Up to the interval play was even with both teams scoring a goal, but in the second half Dumbarton came into their own and McMurray scored the winner.

Three days later Dumbarton travelled to Edinburgh to play St Bernards in their first league encounter. An unchanged side took to the field but the Sons were to find that life in the Second Division was to be a stiff challenge as the interval was reached three goals down. There was no more scoring in the second half and Dumbarton returned home 3–0 losers.

On 25 August Dumbarton entertained Ayr Parkhouse at Boghead, who like the Sons had been promoted from the Scottish Combination. Despite the team showing one change as Edward Kane (ex Airdriehill Juniors) replaced Cairney at left half, the home side were confident of earning their first league points, and so it was as McMurray and Gordon both scored a brace in a 6–0 win.

=== September ===
The first fixture in September saw Dumbarton drawn away to Renton in the first round of the Scottish Qualifying Cup. Both teams played their full strength squads but it was the home side who would advance to the next round after a close contest ended 2–1.

On 8 September Dumbarton rang the changes for their league fixture against Leith Athletic at Boghead. Alex Cameron (ex Maybole), John Gibb (ex Cowdenbeath), John Hope (ex Queen's Park) and Ben Walker (ex Strathclyde juniors) all came into the front line. As expected the new forwards took a while to settle and in a tight game it was the Edinburgh side who took both points in a 2–1 win.

The following week Dumbarton entertained Wishaw Thistle in a friendly. The forwards were more recognisable with Hope and Walker of the new boys retaining their places. And the changes did the trick as the Sons easily disposed of their opponents by 4–1.

On 22 September the return league fixture against Leith Athletic was played at Logie Green. Dumbarton gave new signing from Albion Rovers, John Chapman, his debut at centre forward. In a close contest it was Leith who took the points by the only goal of the match.

A week later league leaders Vale of Leven were visitors to Boghead. Brander took Walker's place at inside left in an otherwise unchanged side. As expected the contest was an exciting one and it was Dumbarton that managed to snatch both points in a 2–1 win, with new boy Chapman scoring his first goal for the club.

So at the end of September Vale of Leven still led the league with 8 points from 6 matches. Dumbarton were in 7th with 4 points from 5 games.

=== October ===
On 5 October Dumbarton were on the road to Falkirk to play East Stirling in a league fixture. An unchanged team was available and in an exciting game full of goals it was the Sons who came out on top by 4–3, wingers Hope and McCormack claiming a brace each.

The following week it was a trip to Arthurlie on league business. Once more an unchanged side attempted to make it three wins in a row. Dumbarton started strongly particularly as Arthurlie played a man short for the first 20 minutes but it wasn't to be and the home side struck three times without reply.

Despite the disappointment of the previous game no changes were made to the team as Dumbarton made the trip to Paisley to play Abercorn in the league. For the second week in a row Dumbarton started the game facing 10 men, but this time made the advantage pay by scoring twice before the 11th man turned up after 20 minutes. Two more goals were scored before the interval and McCormack completed the rout in the second half for an impressive 5–0 win.

On 27 October Dumbarton were down to play at Cowdenbeath in the league. Unfortunately for Cowdenbeath they were also committed to play a Fife Cup match against East Fife and as neither of the opponents would withdraw, Cowdenbeath split their forces to play both games. Dumbarton added Matt Teasdale from Old Kilpatrick at inside left but despite the supposed weakness it was Cowdenbeath who took both points in a 3–2 win.

So October ended with Vale of Leven leading the league with 14 points from 10 games. Dumbarton had improved to lie in 5th place with 8 points from 9 matches.

=== November ===
On the first Saturday of November Dumbarton were visited by Albion Rovers for their first league encounter. Charles O’Neill, an ex Dumbarton Corinthian, was added at right half in place of Bob Gordon, while Gordon took Kane's place at left half. And it was O’Neill who scored Dumbarton's goal 15 minutes into the game. Stevenson had to retire injured 20 minutes into the second half but the Sons held out for a 1–0 win.

Dumbarton rang the changes on 10 November for the visit of Arthurlie to Boghead. William Robertson (ex Dumbarton Corinthians) came in at inside right in place of Brander with injured Stevenson's place at centre half taken by Cairney, and Duncan came in for Chapman at centre forward. Arthurlie had easily won their home tie in October but it was Dumbarton who made home turf count by winning 3–2.

A week later Dumbarton travelled to Coatbridge to play Albion Rovers. Again changes were made to the team with Mitchell returning at right back, Ritchie taking Cairney's place at centre half and Brander being preferred at centre forward. The game at Boghead a fortnight previously was a close tussle and this one was no different. The Sons crossed over a goal to the good, but the Rovers equalised in the second half and while the visitors regained the lead the homesters came back again. Even when the Rovers went down to 10 men due to injury, the advantage was not taken by Dumbarton and at full time the score was tied at 2–2.

On 23 November Dumbarton made the short trip to Millburn Park to play rivals Vale of Leven. Charles Grant (ex Dumbarton Corinthians) was introduced at left half, Chapman returned at centre forward and McCormack was rested at outside left and replaced by Brander. The Boghead fixture in September had been a tough encounter and this turned out to be a similar story. In the first half Vale scored twice assisted by a strong wing but after the interval the Sons made the conditions tell and came back with two goals, the game ending 2–2.

The result meant that Dumbarton held 3rd place in the league with 14 points from 13 games, a point behind Vale of Leven in second, and also a point behind leaders Leith Athletic, but who had 3 games in hand.

=== December ===
December opened with a home league tie against Abercorn. McCormack returned to his usual spot on the left wing while Brander took over from Chapman at centre forward, and Kane returned at left half. The visitors turned up a man short and played with 10 men, but due to some brilliant work on the part of Abercorn's keeper Kerr, it wasn't till 15 minutes into the second half that McCormack scored for the Sons. To their credit Abercorn equalised, and despite having most of the play, Dumbarton could not find a way past Kerr. So for the third week in a row the result was a draw – 1–1.

On 8 December Dumbarton travelled to Ayr to play Parkhouse in the return league fixture. Among the changes to the team were: William Crichton from Dumbarton Corinthians trialled in goals, while Johnny Hill (ex Clydebank juniors) took over at centre forward. Hope was rested on the right wing his place taken by Chapman and Stevenson returned from injury. A strong wind assisted the Sons in the first half yet at the interval the score stood tied at 2–2. However, despite the conditions, Dumbarton put on a further three goals in the second half to win 5–2 – with new boy Hill scoring a hat trick.

A week later it was a trip to Fife to play Raith Rovers in the first league tie. With both Oldcorn and Hope returning to their positions the team was at full strength. On the day Dumbarton played a superior game and with two goals in each half cruised to a 4–0 win.

On 22 December Boghead was the venue for the first league fixture of the season against Ayr United. The team that took to the field showed just one change with Mitchell returning at right back but it took no time for the Sons to gain the lead, Hill scoring after two minutes. Dumbarton maintained the upper had throughout the game and handed their visitors a sound 6–1 thrashing.

It was another home league tie on 29 December as Cowdenbeath came to fulfil the return fixture. Ritchie was again back in at right back and O’Neill took Gordon's place at right half. The first encounter had been close with the Fife team scraping home by the odd goal in five but this time there was no doubt as to the winners as Dumbarton trounced the visitors 4–0.

So as 1906 came to an end, on the back of a nine-game unbeaten run Dumbarton sat at the top of the league with 23 points from 18 games. This however did not tell the full story particularly in the cases of Leith Athletic in 3rd with 20 points but from only 15 games and more especially in the case of St Bernards in 5th place with 16 points but with just 9 games played.

=== January ===
1907 started with confidence with a trip to Ayr to face the team that Dumbarton had comprehensively beaten 6–1 just two weeks earlier. Gordon returned to right half but otherwise it was an unchanged team. While the play was fairly even the Dumbarton forwards performed poorly and in the end the roles were reversed from the first game as Ayr romped to a 5–0 victory.

On 12 January Dumbarton faced East Stirling at Boghead. The Sons had won the previous encounter at Falkirk and following the forwards display the previous week changes were made with Robertson and Duncan coming in at inside and outside left respectively. In addition Crichton replaced Oldcorn in goal. As it was the changes failed to have the desired effect and in a disappointing display the visitors departed with both points in a 2–0 win.

A week later, Dumbarton took a rest from competitive matches to play neighbours Renton in a friendly at Boghead. Dumbarton were anxious to gain revenge for the Qualifying Cup defeat in September and fielded Forrester, a Glasgow junior, as a trialist, in goals. Leading by a goal at the interval, the Sons rattled in another three in the second half to win by 4–1 – all four goals coming from Hill.

With a free Saturday on 26 January, the month came to an end with Dumbarton slipping to 2nd in the league with 23 points from 20 matches, 3 behind Vale of Leven.

=== February ===
On 2 February Dumbarton welcomed Raith Rovers to Boghead for their return league fixture. Gordon replaced Temple at left back while O’Neill took Gordon's place at right half. Teasdale and McCormack returned on the left side of the attack. The Sons were back to their best and with two goals in each half eased to a 4–0 win – with Hill scoring his second league hat trick.

The following Saturday Dumbarton headed out to face their neighbours and rivals Vale of Leven in a friendly. Both teams still had their eyes on winning the league and this was an opportunity to show the strength of their respective claims. A number of changes were made to the Sons team including a trialist at centre half but it was the Vale who completely outclassed Dumbarton on the day by winning 7–1 – Dumbarton's heaviest defeat of the season.

On 16 February, facing another week free from league or cup commitments, Dumbarton were visited by a strong St Mirren ‘A’ side. Two new faces were introduced – Alex Fraser from Duntocher Hibs and Brown from Queens Park Strollers. On the play during the game the Sons were well worth their 3–0 win.

It was back to league duty on 23 February as Dumbarton played their final league encounter against St Bernards at Boghead. If there was to be any chance of the title then this game was a ’must win’ – although the visitors had similar aspirations. Fraser retained his place in goal, with Grant and Lockhart coming back into the team. Dumbarton were to find the St Bernards goalkeeper in superb form and could find no way past, and in the end two first half goals were enough for the visitors to take both points in a 2–0 win.

So at the end of the month Dumbarton maintained 2nd place with 25 points from their 22 games. Vale of Leven were still on top 2 points ahead with a game to play, but it was St Bernards who looked to be favourites for the title lying in 4th with 22 points but with still a massive 8 games left.

=== March ===
With the league commitments at an end, Dumbarton turned their attention to the county championship which began on 2 March with an away trip to Vale of Leven. Mitchell returned in the defence as did Brander to the attack. A few weeks previously the Vale had taught the Sons a lesson in scoring and while play was much more equal this time it was again Vale of Leven who took the game by 3–0.

On 9 March, Dumbarton played a friendly against Alloa Athletic at Boghead. A number of the Sons regulars were out due to injury and a couple of trialists were played, including Brown from Queens Park Strollers. Despite the weaknesses Dumbarton cruised to a 5–2 win with Brown notching a hat trick while Hill got the other two.

After a free weekend, Dumbarton returned to county cup duty with a home game against Renton. New signing John Muirhead (ex Partick Thistle) was introduced at centre forward, with Hill switching to the left wing. The new looking front line got to work right away and by the interval were three goals to the good. Renton came back a bit in the second half but at the final whistle Dumbarton had the win by 3–1.

On 30 March Ayr Parkhouse were the opponents in a friendly fixture at Ayr. Brown was again trialled as was a Govan junior, Medlock. The opponents also gave a number of new faces a try out and in a quiet game it was the Sons who came out on top by 2–1.

=== April ===
The return county cup fixture against Vale of Leven was played at Boghead on 5 April. The team was unchanged from that which played against Renton two weeks previously. The game was an exciting one and despite chances at both ends the interval arrived goalless. Two minutes into the second half and Hill scored Dumbarton's opener. Then Ritchie and Kidd of the Vale were ordered from the field. Twenty minutes from the end the visitors lost another player to injury. Despite the loss, Vale were awarded a penalty just before the end, which they converted to salvage a 1–1 draw.

A week later, the return county tie against Renton was played at Tontine Park. A number of changes were made with Gordon taking suspended Ritchie's place in the defence, Cairney stepped in at left half and Duncan returned on the right wing. A win was essential to qualify for the final and in the end the 3–1 victory was well deserved.

After a free week, Dumbarton met Vale of Leven on 26 April in the final of the Dumbartonshire Cup at Tontine Park. The team was unchanged other than Hope coming back in place of Muirhead who had returned to Partick Thistle. In a rousing tie Dumbarton had most of the play but the scoring was restricted to the last 10 minutes when Hill opened for the Sons. This stung the Vale into action and just before the final whistle they secured a goal for a 1–1 draw.

=== May ===
On 4 May both teams returned to Tontine Park to replay the county final. Dumbarton were unchanged other than Hill returning to centre forward and Hope switching to the left wing. Once again the Sons started strongly and within the first 10 minutes were 2–0 in front. The Vale got one back before the interval but it was not until ten minutes from full time that they managed to secure a draw from a penalty kick – the result being 2–2.

So for the third week running Dumbarton and Vale of Leven met at Tontine Park and this time it would be played to a finish. Dumbarton introduced Alex McCulloch (Renfrew Victoria) in defence and Peter Taylor (Dumbarton Harp) in the attack. Once again the Sons had the majority of the game but could not find a way past the Vale keeper. At full time the score stood at 0–0 and so a further 30 minutes were played without any scoring. Then after retiring for 15 minutes another half hour's play ensued where the Vale scored twice without reply – and so retained the county championship.

The bottom three clubs from the First Division and 5 clubs from the Second Division, including Dumbarton (who had finished in 4th place) were up for election. As it was the 'status quo' was preserved with the existing 'top flight' teams maintaining their status, and Dumbarton having to accept another season in Division 2.

== Match results ==
=== Scottish League ===
18 August 1906 Scottish League	St Bernard's	3–0	Dumbarton	Royal Gymnasium Ground
	Hall			Attendance: 500; Referee: Mr Phillips

25 August 1906 Scottish League	Dumbarton	6–0	Ayr Parkhouse	Boghead Park
	McMurray 25'; Gordon; Stevenson; Brander			Referee: Mr Adams

8 September 1906 Scottish League	Dumbarton	1–2	Leith Athletic	Boghead Park
	Hope 30'		Wallace 15'; Lee	Attendance: 2,000; Referee: Mr Jack

22 September 1906 Scottish League	Leith Athletic	1–0	Dumbarton	Old Logie Green
	Wallace			Attendance: 3,000; Referee: Mr Livingstone

29 September 1906 Scottish League	Dumbarton	2–1	Vale of Leven	Boghead Park
	Chapman; McCormack		Goal	Attendance: 3,000

6 October 1906 Scottish League	E Stirling	3–4	Dumbarton	Merchiston Park
	Whyte; Baird		McCormack; Hope	Attendance: 2,000; Referee: Mr Wilson

13 October 1906 Scottish League	Arthurlie	3–0	Dumbarton	Dunterlie Park (1906–1919)
	Stirling; Bell			Referee: J McPherson

20 October 1906 Scottish League	Abercorn	0–5	Dumbarton	Old Ralston Park
			Chapman; Brander; Hope; Stevenson; McCormack	Referee: Mr Goldie

27 October 1906 Scottish League	Cowdenbeath	3–2	Dumbarton	North End Park
	Goal		Hope; Teasdale

3 November 1906 Scottish League	Dumbarton	1–0	Albion Rovers	Boghead Park
	O'Neil 15'			Attendance: 2,000

10 November 1906 Scottish League	Dumbarton	3–2	Arthurlie	Boghead Park
	Hope 15'; McCormack 17' (pen.); Teasdale 47'		Stirling 40', 85'	Attendance: 2,000

17 November 1906 Scottish League	Albion Rovers	2–2	Dumbarton	Meadow Park (Coatbridge)
	Chalmers; Ralston 90'		McCormack 10'; Hope	Referee: Mr Jack

24 November 1906 Scottish League	Vale of Leven	2–2	Dumbarton	Millburn Park
	McCallum; Currie		Gordon; Chapman	Attendance: 5,000; Referee: Mr Jacks

1 December 1906 Scottish League	Dumbarton	1–1	Abercorn	Boghead Park
	McCormack 60'		Cameron 70'	Attendance: 2,000

8 December 1906 Scottish League	Ayr Parkhouse	2–5	Dumbarton	Beresford Park
	Gemmill 22'; Hendron		Hill 12'; Teasdale	Referee: Mr Martin

15 December 1906 Scottish League	Raith Rovers	0–4	Dumbarton	Starks Park
			Hill 40'; McCormack 41'; Teasdale; Brander 70'	Referee: Mr Philip

22 December 1906 Scottish League	Dumbarton	6–1	Ayr	Boghead Park
	Hill 2'; Stevenson; Teasdale; Hope; Brander		Galloway

29 December 1906 Scottish League	Dumbarton	4–0	Cowdenbeath	Boghead Park
	Brander; Stevenson; Hope

5 January 1907 Scottish League	Ayr	5–0	Dumbarton	Somerset Park
	McGowan; Main; Rodger

12 January 1907 Scottish League	Dumbarton	0–2	E Stirling	Boghead Park
			McTaggart 20'; McNair	Attendance: 2,000; Referee: P Hodge

2 February 1907 Scottish League	Dumbarton	4–0	Raith Rovers	Boghead Park
	Hill 25', 42', 75'; Stevenson 80'			Attendance: 2,000; Referee: Mr Lorimer

23 February 1907 Scottish League	Dumbarton	0–2	St Bernard's	Boghead Park
			Ritchie 5'; McDonald	Attendance: 500; Referee: A McCallum

=== Scottish Qualifying Cup ===
1 September 1906 QualifyCup R1	Renton	2–1	Dumbarton	Tontine Park
	Goal		Gordon	Attendance: 3,000

=== Dumbartonshire Cup ===
2 March 1907 League	Vale of Leven	3–0	Dumbarton	Millburn Park
	Brown 20'; Kidd			Attendance: 3,000; Referee: A Brady

23 March 1907 League	Dumbarton	3–1	Renton	Boghead Park
	Muirhead; Teasdale; Hope		Goal	Attendance: 2,500

6 April 1907 League	Dumbarton	1–1	Vale of Leven	Boghead Park
	Hill 47'		Brown (pen.)	Attendance: 2,500; Referee: J Murray

13 April 1907 League	Renton	1–3	Dumbarton	Tontine Park
	Travers 90'		Brander 23'; Hill	Attendance: 2,000; Referee: J Penman

27 April 1907 Final	Dumbarton	1–1	Vale of Leven	Tontine Park
	Hill 80'		Findlay 85'	Attendance: 3,500; Referee: J Penman

4 May 1907 Final replay	Dumbarton	2–2	Vale of Leven	Tontine Park
	Brander 2'; Duncan 10'		McCallum 35'; Brown 80' (pen.)	Attendance: 3,000; Referee: J Penman

11 May 1907 Final replay	Dumbarton	0–2 (a.e.t.)	Vale of Leven	Tontine Park
			Findlay; O'Brien	Attendance: 3,000; Referee: A Jackson

==== Final league table ====
Pos	Team	Pld	W	D	L	GF	GA	GD	Pts
1	Vale of Leven	4	1	3	0	5	2	+3	6
2	Dumbarton	4	2	1	1	5	6	−1	7
3	Renton	4	0	2	2	3	7	−4	2

=== Friendlies ===
15 August 1906 Friendly	Dumbarton	2–1	Queen's Park	Boghead Park
	Brander; McMurray		Goal	Attendance: 2,000

15 September 1906 Friendly	Dumbarton	4–1	Wishaw Thistle	Boghead Park
	McCormack; Stevenson; Cameron		Laughlan

19 January 1907 Friendly	Dumbarton	4–1	Renton	Boghead Park
	Hill		Goal

9 February 1907 Friendly	Vale of Leven	7–1	Dumbarton	Millburn Park
	Goal		Stevenson	Attendance: 3,000

16 February 1907 Friendly	Dumbarton	3–0	St Mirren XI	Boghead Park
	Goal

9 March 1907 Friendly	Dumbarton	5–2	Alloa Athletic	Boghead Park
	Brown 10'; Hill		Young 20'; Wallace

30 March 1907 Friendly	Ayr Parkhouse	1–2	Dumbarton	Beresford Park
	Goal		Goal

== Player statistics ==
No.	Pos	Nat	Player	Total		Second Division		Qualifying Cup	
No.	Pos	Nat	Player	Apps	Goals	Apps	Goals	Apps	Goals
	GK	(Scotland) SCO	William Crichton	1	0	1	0	0	0
	GK	(Scotland) SCO	Alexander Fraser	1	0	1	0	0	0
	GK	(Scotland) SCO	Richard Oldcorn	21	0	20	0	1	0
	DF	(Scotland) SCO	Harry Mitchell	6	0	5	0	1	0
	DF	(Scotland) SCO	John Temple	21	0	20	0	1	0
	MF	(Scotland) SCO	Thomas Cairney	2	0	2	0	0	0
	MF	(Scotland) SCO	Charles Grant	2	0	2	0	0	0
	MF	(Scotland) SCO	Bob Gordon	22	4	21	3	1	1
	MF	(Scotland) SCO	Edward Kane	16	0	15	0	1	0
	MF	(Scotland) SCO	Charles O'Neill	8	1	8	1	0	0
	MF	(Scotland) SCO	James Stevenson	19	5	18	5	1	0
	FW	(Scotland) SCO	John Brander	20	6	19	6	1	0
	FW	(Scotland) SCO	Alex Cameron	1	0	1	0	0	0
	FW	(Scotland) SCO	John Chapman	9	3	9	3	0	0
	FW	(Scotland) SCO	Scott Duncan	10	0	9	0	1	0
	FW	(Scotland) SCO	John Gibb	1	0	1	0	0	0
	FW	(Scotland) SCO	Johnny Hill	8	9	8	9	0	0
	FW	(Scotland) SCO	John Hope	19	9	19	9	0	0
	FW	(Scotland) SCO	Alex Lockhart	1	0	1	0	0	0
	FW	(Scotland) SCO	Francis McCormick	19	8	18	8	1	0
	FW	(Scotland) SCO	Alex McMurray	3	2	2	2	1	0
	FW	(Scotland) SCO	George Ritchie	3	0	2	0	1	0
	FW	(Scotland) SCO	William Robertson	7	0	7	0	0	0
	FW	(Scotland) SCO	Matt Teasdale	13	6	13	6	0	0
	FW	(Scotland) SCO	Ben Walker	2	0	2	0	0	0

=== Transfers ===
==== Players in ====
Player	From	Date
(Scotland) Scott Duncan	(Scotland) Dumbarton Corinthians	8 Jun 1906
(Scotland) George Ritchie	(Scotland) Vale of Leven	4 Jul 1906
(Scotland) Edward Kane	(Scotland) Airdriehill	11 Aug 1906
(Scotland) Alex Cameron	(Scotland) Maybole - trialist	28 Aug 1906
(Scotland) Ben Walker	(Scotland) Strathclyde - trialist	5 Sep 1906
(Scotland) John Gibb	(Scotland) Cowdenbeath - trialist	7 Sep 1906
(Scotland) John Hope	(Scotland) Queen's Park	8 Sep 1906
(Scotland) John Chapman	(Scotland) Albion Rovers	15 Sep 1906
(Scotland) Matt Teasdale	(Scotland) Old Kilpatrick	24 Oct 1906
(Scotland) Charles O'Neill	(Scotland) Dumbarton Corinthians	1 Nov 1906
(Scotland) William Robertson	(Scotland) Dumbarton Corinthians	7 Nov 1906
(Scotland) Charles Grant	(Scotland) Dumbarton Corinthians	21 Nov 1906
(Scotland) Johnny Hill	(Scotland) Clydebank Juniors	5 Dec 1906
(Scotland) William Crichton	(Scotland) Dumbarton Corinthians - trialist	5 Dec 1906
(Scotland) Alexander Fraser	(Scotland) Duntocher Hibs	21 Feb 1907
(Scotland) Alex McCulloch	(Scotland) Renfrew Victoria	May 1907
(Scotland) Peter Taylor	(Scotland) Dumbarton Harp	9 May 1907

==== Players out ====
Player	To	Date
(Scotland) John Crawford	(Scotland) Renton	May 1906
(Scotland) George Galbraith	(Scotland) Clyde	May 1906
(Scotland) James Stewart	(Scotland) Motherwell	May 1906
(Scotland) Peter McMillan	(Scotland) Partick Thistle	12 May 1906
(Scotland) Tom Kelso	(Scotland) Renton	August 1906
(Scotland) Thomas Cairney	(Scotland) St Mirren	27 April 1907
(Scotland) John Chapman	(Scotland) Albion Rovers	Apr 1907
(Scotland) Francis McCormick	(Scotland) Albion Rovers	Jun 1907
(Scotland) Richard Oldcorn	(Scotland) Carfin Emmett	Jun 1907

In addition Alex Lockhart, Alex McMurray and John Temple played their last 'first XI' games in Dumbarton colours.

== Reserve team ==
Dumbarton lost in the second round of the Scottish Second XI Cup to Rangers.
