= John McLean (footballer, born 1877) =

Scottish footballer

Personal information
- Full name: John McLean
- Date of birth: 1877
- Place of birth: Bonhill, Scotland
- Date of death: 1958
- Place of death: Larbert, Scotland
- Position: Defender

Senior career*
| Years | Team | Apps | (Gls) |
| 1896–1903 | Vale of Leven | | |
| 1903–1904 | Liverpool | 4 | (0) |
| 1904–1910 | Motherwell | 132 | (0) |
| 1910–1911 | Vale of Leven | 12 | (0) |
- * Club domestic league appearances and goals

John McLean (1877 – 1958) was a Scottish footballer who played as a defender (capable of playing at left or right back, which in that era were the most withdrawn positions on the field). He played for Vale of Leven, at that time playing outwith the Scottish Football League, for seven years before joining Liverpool in May 1903. He played four English Football League matches early in the 1903–04 campaign, but the team failed to win any of these games and he was dropped (the results did not improve, however, and the club was relegated at the end of the season); he then left to join Motherwell in June 1904. (Note: This source originally named the player 'James McLean', being amended around 2017.) McLean spent six years as a regular at Fir Park before returning to Vale of Leven for one further season. (Note: In the source, his record has been merged with that of an earlier Liverpool player of the same name and position.)

His younger brother Robert was also a footballer.
