= Robert MacLean (disambiguation) =

Robert MacLean (born 1970) is a U.S. Transportation Security Administration, aviation security, and national security whistleblower.

Robert MacLean or McLean may also refer to:

- Rob MacLean (born 1958), Scottish sports presenter
- Douglas Maclean (Robert Donald Douglas Maclean, 1852–1929), New Zealand politician
- Robert McLean (footballer) (1884–1936), Scottish footballer

== See also ==
- Bob McLean (disambiguation)
- Robert McLane (1867–1904), American politician, military officer, and diplomat
