= Bob McLean =

Bob McLean may refer to:

- Bob McLean (Australian footballer) (1914–1989), member of the Australian Football Hall of Fame
- Bob McLean (politician), American politician
- Bob McLean (racing driver) (1933–1966), Canadian racing driver
- Bob McLean (rugby union) (born 1949), rugby union player who represented Australia
- Bob McLean (Scottish footballer) (1902–1970), Scottish footballer (Alloa Athletic, Doncaster Rovers)
- Bob McLean (winemaker) (1947–2015), Australian winemaker

== See also ==
- Robert McLean (disambiguation)
- Robert MacLean (disambiguation)
