= 1906–07 Scottish Football League =

Scottish football season

Statistics of the Scottish Football League in season 1906–07.

== Scottish League Division One ==
Pos	Team	Pld	W	D	L	GF	GA	GD	Pts	Qualification or relegation
1	Celtic (C)	34	23	9	2	80	30	+50	55	Champions
2	Dundee	34	18	12	4	53	26	+27	48	
3	Rangers	34	19	7	8	69	33	+36	45	
4	Airdrieonians	34	18	6	10	59	44	+15	42	
5	Falkirk	34	17	7	10	73	58	+15	41	
6	Third Lanark	34	15	9	10	57	48	+9	39	
7	St Mirren	34	12	13	9	50	44	+6	37	
8	Clyde	34	15	6	13	47	52	−5	36	
9	Heart of Midlothian	34	11	13	10	46	43	+3	35	
10	Motherwell	34	12	9	13	45	48	−3	33	
11	Hibernian	34	10	10	14	40	49	−9	30	
12	Aberdeen	34	10	10	14	48	55	−7	30	
13	Morton	34	11	6	17	41	50	−9	28	
14	Partick Thistle	34	9	8	17	40	60	−20	26	
15	Queen's Park	34	9	6	19	51	66	−15	24	
16	Port Glasgow Athletic	34	7	7	20	30	67	−37	21	
17	Kilmarnock	34	8	5	21	40	72	−32	21	
18	Hamilton Academical	34	8	5	21	40	64	−24	21	

(C) Champions

== Scottish League Division Two ==
Pos	Team	Pld	W	D	L	GF	GA	GD	Pts
1	St Bernard's (C)	22	14	4	4	41	24	+17	32
2	Arthurlie	22	12	3	7	51	40	+11	27
2	Vale of Leven	22	13	1	8	54	35	+19	27
4	Dumbarton	22	11	3	8	52	35	+17	25
5	Leith Athletic	22	10	4	8	40	35	+5	24
6	Albion Rovers	22	10	3	9	43	36	+7	23
6	Cowdenbeath	22	10	5	7	36	40	−4	23 (Note: Cowdenbeath were docked two points for fielding an ineligible player.)
8	Ayr	22	7	6	9	34	38	−4	20
9	Abercorn	22	5	7	10	29	47	−18	17
10	Raith Rovers	22	6	4	12	40	48	−8	16 (Note: Raith Rovers and East Stirlingshire finished level on points but Raith Rovers won a play-off match to determine ranking positions.)
11	East Stirlingshire	22	6	4	12	36	48	−12	16
12	Ayr Parkhouse	22	5	2	15	33	63	−30	12

Source: statto.com
Rules for classification: Teams finish equal if level on points. Points system: 2 points for a win, 1 point for a draw, 0 points for a loss
(C) Champions

== See also ==
- 1906–07 in Scottish football
