= 1911–12 Scottish Football League =

Scottish football season

Statistics of the Scottish Football League in season 1911–12.

== Scottish League Division One ==
Pos	Team	Pld	W	D	L	GF	GA	GD	Pts
1	Rangers (C)	34	24	3	7	86	34	+52	51
2	Celtic	34	17	11	6	58	33	+25	45
3	Clyde	34	19	4	11	56	32	+24	42
4	Heart of Midlothian	34	16	8	10	54	40	+14	40
5	Partick Thistle	34	16	8	10	47	40	+7	40
6	Morton	34	14	9	11	44	44	0	37
7	Falkirk	34	15	6	13	46	33	+13	36
8	Dundee	34	13	9	12	52	41	+11	35
9	Aberdeen	34	14	7	13	44	44	0	35
10	Airdrieonians	34	12	8	14	40	41	−1	32
11	Third Lanark	34	12	7	15	40	57	−17	31
12	Hamilton Academical	34	11	8	15	32	44	−12	30
13	Hibernian	34	12	5	17	44	47	−3	29
14	Motherwell	34	11	5	18	34	44	−10	27
15	Raith Rovers	34	9	9	16	39	59	−20	27
16	Kilmarnock	34	11	4	19	38	60	−22	26
17	Queen's Park	34	8	9	17	29	53	−24	25
18	St Mirren	34	7	10	17	32	59	−27	24

Source: "1911-1912 Division 1 - SPFL Archive". SPFL.
(C) Champions

== Scottish League Division Two ==
Pos	Team	Pld	W	D	L	GF	GA	GD	Pts
1	Ayr United (C)	22	16	3	3	54	24	+30	35
2	Abercorn	22	13	4	5	43	22	+21	30
3	Dumbarton	22	13	1	8	47	31	+16	27
4	Cowdenbeath	22	12	2	8	39	31	+8	26
5	St Johnstone	22	10	4	8	29	27	+2	24
6	St Bernard's	22	9	5	8	38	36	+2	23
7	Leith Athletic	22	9	4	9	31	34	−3	22
8	Arthurlie	22	7	5	10	30	30	0	19
9	East Stirlingshire	22	7	3	12	21	31	−10	17
10	Dundee Hibernian	22	5	5	12	21	41	−20	15
11	Albion Rovers	22	6	1	15	19	41	−22	13
11	Vale of Leven	22	6	1	15	26	50	−24	13

Source: statto.com
Rules for classification: Teams finish equal if level on points. Points system: 2 points for a win, 1 point for a draw, 0 points for a loss
(C) Champions

== See also ==
- 1911–12 in Scottish football
