= Robert McLean (engineer) =

Scottish industrialist and engineer

Sir Robert McLean (3 February 1884 – 9 April 1964) was a Scottish industrialist and engineer. He was General Manager of the Great Indian Peninsula Railway and later Chairman of Vickers Aviation Limited.

== Early life ==
McLean was born in Lanarkshire, Scotland on 3 February 1883 the son of The Reverend D McLean. He was educated at the Edinburgh Academy and he took a Science Degree in Engineering at the University of Edinburgh.

== Indian Railways and First World War ==
From 1905 he was an Assistant Engineer in the Indian Public Works Department, his duties included the operation and maintenance of the railways and he was also involved in surveying and building new railways line. From 1915 to 1916 he served in the British Expeditionary Force in Aden, he also served in Mesopotamia and on the Western Front. He was in the Royal Flying Corps, where he earned a Military Cross, so was one of the first pilots in the RAF. After the war when he returned to India he became the Assistant Secretary of the Railway Board, in 1919 he was promoted to Secretary. In 1920 he was loaned to the Great Indian Peninsula Railway Board as a deputy agent and later General Manager. McLean was responsible for starting the first railway electrification scheme in India, at first the Bombay suburban lines and later the electrification of the over 240 miles of main lines. In 1926 he was Knighted and he retired from India in 1927.

== Vickers ==
On his return to the United Kingdom McLean was elected to the board of Vickers Limited. By 1928 he was responsible for the aviation interests of the company. Vickers purchased the Supermarine Company and McLean encouraged both R J Mitchell and Barnes Wallis in the development of new aircraft. The work of Mitchell lead to the design and production of the Supermarine Spitfire single-seat fighter and Wallis was involved in geodetic construction system. The geodetic system lead to the Vickers Wellesley and later the Vickers Wellington twin-engined bombers. McLean was managing director of Vickers (Aviation) until 1939.

== Music ==
When McLean left Vickers he was elected to the board of Electrical and Musical Industries (EMI) in February 1939. In May 1939 he was appointed managing director of the Gramophone Company.

== Spitfire ==
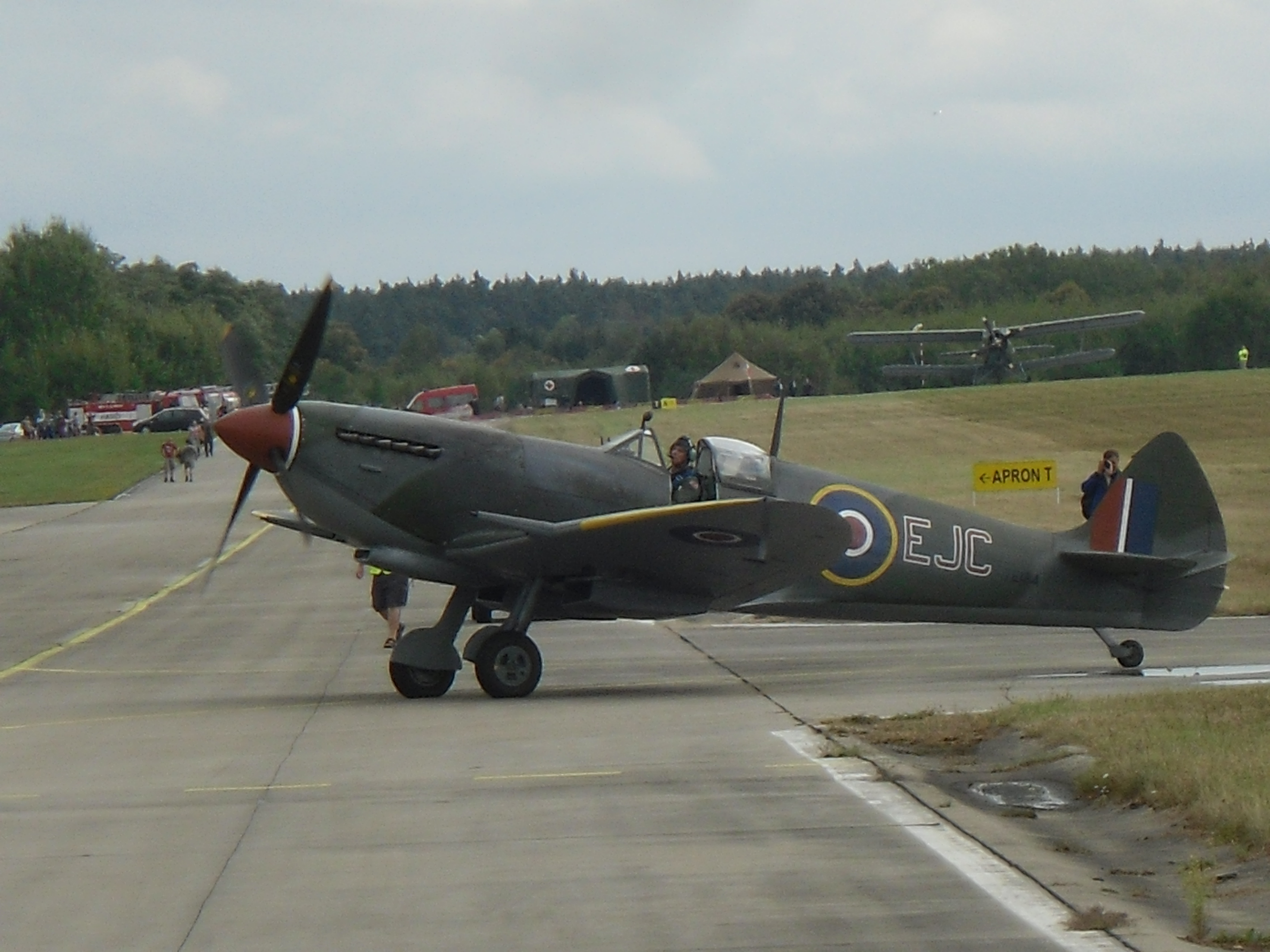
The Spitfire was named after his nickname for his eldest daughter Annie

As Chairman of Vickers (Aviation), he was responsible for buying Supermarine in 1928. He gave his eldest daughter born 3 July 1911 in Knutsford, later Annie Penrose, the nickname a little spitfire; which is where the Spitfire aircraft took its name from. The Spitfire had also been given to the Supermarine Type 224 in 1934.

It was not just the name that he gave to the Spitfire; with Arthur Sidgreaves he had decided to start the project that led to the, known initially as the Supermarine Type 300. The Air Ministry placed a contract for the aircraft on 1 December 1934 for £10,000. On 3 June 1936, Supermarine received an order for 310 Spitfires for £1.25m. The Spitfire name was confirmed by the Air Ministry on 10 June 1936. The first production Spitfire K9787 flew on 15 May 1938 from Eastleigh.

== Family life ==
McLean Married Evelyn Noel Girard in India in 1908, they had two daughters. He died on 9 April 1964 in Edinburgh, Scotland, aged 80.
