= 1907–08 Scottish Football League =

Scottish football season

Statistics of the Scottish Football League in season 1907–08.

== Scottish League Division One ==
Pos	Team	Pld	W	D	L	GF	GA	GD	Pts
1	Celtic (C)	34	24	7	3	86	27	+59	55
2	Falkirk	34	22	7	5	103	42	+61	51
3	Rangers	34	21	8	5	74	40	+34	50
4	Dundee	33	20	8	5	74	40	+34	48
5	Hibernian	34	17	8	9	55	42	+13	42
6	Airdrieonians	34	18	5	11	58	41	+17	41
7	St Mirren	34	13	10	11	50	59	−9	36
8	Aberdeen	34	13	9	12	45	44	+1	35
9	Third Lanark	34	13	7	14	45	50	−5	33
10	Motherwell	34	12	7	15	61	53	+8	31
11	Heart of Midlothian	34	11	6	17	50	62	−12	28
12	Hamilton Academical	34	10	8	16	55	65	−10	28
13	Morton	34	9	9	16	43	66	−23	27
14	Partick Thistle	34	8	9	17	43	69	−26	25
15	Kilmarnock	34	6	13	15	38	61	−23	25
16	Queen's Park	34	7	8	19	54	84	−30	22
17	Clyde	34	5	8	21	38	75	−37	18
18	Port Glasgow Athletic	34	5	7	22	39	98	−59	17

(C) Champions

== Scottish League Division Two ==
Pos	Team	Pld	W	D	L	GF	GA	GD	Pts
1	Raith Rovers (C)	22	14	2	6	37	23	+14	30
2	Ayr	22	11	5	6	40	33	+7	27
2	Dumbarton	22	12	5	5	49	32	+17	27 (Note: Dumbarton were docked two points for fielding an ineligible player.)
4	Abercorn	22	9	5	8	33	30	+3	23
4	East Stirlingshire	22	9	5	8	30	32	−2	23
6	Ayr Parkhouse	22	11	0	11	38	38	0	22
7	Leith Athletic	22	8	5	9	41	40	+1	21
7	St Bernard's	22	8	5	9	31	32	−1	21
9	Albion Rovers	22	7	5	10	36	48	−12	19
10	Vale of Leven	22	5	8	9	25	31	−6	18
11	Arthurlie	22	6	5	11	33	45	−12	17
12	Cowdenbeath	22	5	4	13	26	35	−9	14

Source: statto.com
Rules for classification: Teams finish equal if level on points. Points system: 2 points for a win, 1 point for a draw, 0 points for a loss
(C) Champions

== See also ==
- 1907–08 in Scottish football
