= William Black (footballer) =

Scottish footballer

Personal information
- Full name: William Black
- Date of birth: 5 September 1882
- Place of birth: Mull, Scotland
- Date of death: 7 February 1960 (aged 77)
- Place of death: Motherwell, Scotland
- Height: 5 ft 9 in (1.75 m)
- Position: Right half

Youth career
- Enfield Star

Senior career*
Years	Team	Apps	(Gls)
1900–1903	Dalziel Rovers		
1903–1904	Queen's Park	11	(0)
1904–1905	Celtic	10	(0)
1905–1907	Everton	20	(0)
1907	→ Broxburn (loan)		
1907–1908	Dumbarton	1	(0)
1908–1909	Kilmarnock	1	(0)
1909–1911	Hamilton Academical	41	(0)
1911–1912	Airdrieonians	10	(0)
Total		94	(0)
- * Club domestic league appearances and goals

William Black (5 September 1882 – 7 February 1960) was a Scottish footballer who played for Queen's Park, Celtic (winning the Scottish Football League title in his sole season with the club, 1904–05, but suffering a bad injury), Everton Dumbarton, Kilmarnock, Hamilton Academical and Airdrieonians. (Note: Some sources suggest that Black played for Ayr United and other clubs in south-west Scotland after leaving Hamilton, but other records indicate that a player of the same name and position was already involved with those clubs in 1908. It is perhaps more logical that he would move from Hamilton to Airdrieonians with both clubs located close to his home in Motherwell.) He was born on the Isle of Mull but spent most of his life living in Motherwell.
