= John Brander =

Scottish footballer

Personal information
- Full name: John Nelson Brander
- Date of birth: 15 June 1884
- Place of birth: Dennystown, Scotland
- Date of death: 1977 (aged 92–93)
- Place of death: Dumbarton, Scotland
- Position: Inside forward

Senior career*
Years	Team	Apps	(Gls)
1905–1915	Dumbarton	100	(40)
1915–1916	Rangers	3	(0)
1915	→ Vale of Leven (loan)		
1916–1917	Vale of Leven		
1917–1920	Clydebank	68	(13)
1920–1917	Vale of Leven	25	(3)
- * Club domestic league appearances and goals

John Nelson Brander (born 15 June 1884) was a Scottish footballer who played for Dumbarton, Vale of Leven, Rangers and Clydebank.
