= Johnny Hill (footballer) =

Scottish footballer (1884–?)

John Hill
Personal information
- Full name: John Hill
- Date of birth: 17 January 1884
- Place of birth: Dumbarton, Scotland

Youth career
- Clydebank Juniors

Senior career*
| Years | Team | Apps | (Gls) |
| 1906–1912 | Dumbarton | 104 | (59) |
| 1912–1913 | Dumbarton Harp | ? | (?) |
| 1913–1914 | Celtic | 2 | (0) |
| 1913–1914 | Vale of Leven | ? | (?) |
| ? | Renton | ? | (?) |
| 1917–1918 | Vale of Leven | ? | (?) |
- * Club domestic league appearances and goals

John Hill (born 17 January 1884) was a Scottish footballer who played for Dumbarton, Dumbarton Harp, Celtic, Vale of Leven and Renton.
