= Robert McLean (footballer) =

Scottish footballer

Personal information
- Full name: Robert Craig McLean
- Date of birth: 17 February 1879
- Place of birth: Bonhill, Scotland
- Date of death: 24 October 1936 (aged 57)
- Place of death: Alexandria, Scotland
- Height: 5 ft 9 in (1.75 m)
- Position: Half-back

Youth career
- Strathleven

Senior career*
Years	Team	Apps	(Gls)
- Rutherglen Glencairn
- Vale of Leven
1904–1905	Millwall		
1905–1906	Newcastle United	0	(0)
1906–1907	Southampton	7	(0)
1907–1908	Dumbarton	6	(0)
1908–1909	Vale of Leven	6	(0)
- * Club domestic league appearances and goals

Robert Craig McLean (17 February 1879 – 24 October 1936) was a Scottish professional footballer. After initially playing in Scotland, McLean moved to Millwall in 1904 and later joined Newcastle United and finally Southampton, before returning to his home country to finish his playing career. He played primarily as a half-back.

== Career ==
Robert McLean was born in Bonhill (today in West Dunbartonshire) and played his first football with junior club Rutherglen Glencairn, and Vale of Leven — at that point competing outwith the Scottish Football League. In August 1904 he moved to England to join Southern League side Millwall, and after one season joined First Division club Newcastle United, where he found himself "way down the pecking order".

After making no appearances for United, the following May he returned to the Southern League, this time joining Southampton. Described as "a bustling, vigorous half-back" who liked to launch long balls into the opponent's goal area, McLean made his debut in the Western League on 10 September 1906 in a 3–2 win over Tottenham Hotspur. His final appearance came in a 5–1 Southern League defeat at the hands of Reading on 25 March 1907. In his one season with the club, McLean made seven first-team appearances for the Saints – four in the Southern League and three in the Western League – before in March 1907 he "fell foul of the club's strict disciplinary code" and was suspended sine die for drunkenness.

After his dismissal from Southampton, McLean returned to the Second Division and played for Dumbarton and former club Vale of Leven before retiring from the game.

== Personal life ==
During World War I, McLean served with The Royal Scots Fusiliers and was awarded the British War Medal, the British Victory Medal and the 1914-15 Star, irreverently referred to as "Pip, Squeak and Wilfred".

He died in 1936 in Alexandria, West Dunbartonshire.

His elder brother John was also a footballer.
