= 1947 Scottish League Cup final (October) =

- Event: 1947–48 Scottish League Cup
East Fife	Falkirk

Final
East Fife	Falkirk
0	0
- Date: 25 October 1947
- Venue: Hampden Park, Glasgow
- Attendance: 53,785

Replay
East Fife	Falkirk
4	1
- Date: 1 November 1947
- Venue: Hampden Park, Glasgow
- Attendance: 31,000

The 1947–48 Scottish League Cup final was played on 25 October 1947 and replayed on 1 November 1947. It was the final of the second Scottish League Cup competition, and it was contested by East Fife and Falkirk. The first match was a goalless draw, necessitating a reply that East Fife won 4–1, mainly thanks to a hat-trick by Davie Duncan.

== Match details ==
25 October 1947

Falkirk	0–0	East Fife

Hampden Park, Glasgow
Attendance: 53,785

FALKIRK :
GK	Jerry Dawson
FB	Jock Whyte
FB	Jim McPhie
RH	Bobby Bolt
CH	Bob Henderson (c)
LH	John Whitelaw
RW	Jim Fiddes
IF	Neil Fleck
CF	Archie Aikman
IF	Jackie Henderson
LW	Ken Dawson
Manager:
Tully Craig

EAST FIFE :
GK	John Niven
FB	Willie Laird
FB	Sammy Stewart
RH	Jimmy Philp
CH	Willie Finlay
LH	George Aitken
RW	Tommy Adams (c)
IF	Doug Davidson
CF	Henry Morris
IF	Jack Davidson
LW	Davie Duncan
Manager:
Scot Symon

=== Replay ===
1 November 1947

East Fife	4–1	Falkirk
Adams; Duncan		Aikman

Hampden Park, Glasgow
Attendance: 31,000

EAST FIFE :
GK	John Niven
FB	Willie Laird
FB	Sammy Stewart
RH	Jimmy Philp
CH	Willie Finlay
LH	George Aitken
RW	Tommy Adams (c)
IF	Doug Davidson
CF	Henry Morris
IF	Jack Davidson
LW	Davie Duncan
Manager:
Scot Symon

FALKIRK :
GK	Jerry Dawson
FB	Jock Whyte
FB	Jim McPhie
RH	Bobby Bolt
CH	Bob Henderson (c)
LH	Jimmy Gallacher
RW	Jim Fiddes
IF	Jimmy Alison
CF	Archie Aikman
IF	Jackie Henderson
LW	Ken Dawson
Manager:
Tully Craig
