= 1949 Scottish League Cup final (October) =

- Event: 1949–50 Scottish League Cup
East Fife	Dunfermline Athletic
3	0
- Date: 29 October 1949
- Venue: Hampden Park, Glasgow
- Attendance: 39,744

The 1949–50 Scottish League Cup final was played on 29 October 1949, at Hampden Park in Glasgow and was the final of the fourth Scottish League Cup competition. The final was a Fife derby match contested by East Fife and Dunfermline Athletic. East Fife won the match 3–0 thanks to goals by Davie Duncan, Charlie Fleming and Henry Morris.

== Match details ==
29 October 1949

East Fife	3–0	Dunfermline Athletic
Duncan; Fleming; Morris

Hampden Park, Glasgow
Attendance: 39,744

EAST FIFE :
GK	John McGarrity
FB	Willie Laird (c)
FB	Sammy Stewart
RH	Jimmy Philp
CH	Willie Finlay
LH	George Aitken
RW	Bobby Black
IF	Charlie Fleming
CF	Henry Morris
IF	Allan Brown
LW	Davie Duncan
Manager:
Scot Symon

DUNFERMLINE ATHLETIC :
GK	George Johnstone
FB	Bobby Kirk
FB	Adam McLean
RH	Jackie McCall
CH	Jimmy Clarkson (c)
LH	Andy Whyte
RW	Gerry Mays
IF	Jim Cannon
CF	George Henderson
IF	Tom McGairy
LW	Stirton Smith
Manager:
Webber Lees
