= Willie Laird =

Scottish footballer

Senior career*
Years	Team	Apps	(Gls)
- East Stirlingshire
1937–1950	East Fife	219	(1)
- * Club domestic league appearances and goals

Willie Laird was a Scottish association football player, best known for his time with East Fife before and after the Second World War.

== Biography ==
Willie Laird joined East Fife in 1937, signing from East Stirlingshire. He debuted for the Fifers in November of the same year in a 1–1 draw at Broomfield away to Airdrieonians. Laird established himself immediately as a first-team regular and was selected for every one of the club's games in the run when they won the 1937–38 Scottish Cup - the only time the Methil men have won the trophy.

Laird returned to East Fife after the Second World War as the club enjoyed further success. In 1946–47 (the first season after the war), the club finished third, missing promotion by one place. In 1947–48, they were promoted to the top flight of Scottish football as 'B' Division champions.

During this post-war "Golden Period", East Fife won the Scottish League Cup three occasions within seven years (1947–48, 1949–50, and 1953–54). A third Scottish Cup final appearance was added to its achievements list in 1949–50. In Laird's two full seasons in Scotland's top division, East Fife finished fourth both times.

Laird was playing at the club until 19 August 1950, with his last game being against Third Lanark at Bayview. He is the only man to win three major cup winners' medals while playing for East Fife, a feat unlikely to be matched nor beaten. He made 219 East Fife appearances, scoring one goal against his former club East Stirlingshire. In the season when Laird stopped playing for East Fife, the club's finishing League position dropped to tenth.

Among the players who played with Laird were Tommy Adams who also played in the Scottish Cup winning side before the war. Others joined the club and would go on to represent Scotland while at the club – George Aitken, Davie Duncan, Allan Brown, Henry Morris and Charlie Fleming while Jimmy Philp and winger Bobby Black were among those who picked up cup winners' medals at the club.

With Laird at the club at the beginning of their golden era, East Fife spent ten successive seasons in Scotland's top league with five finishes in the top six. Aside from this period, the club spent only four other seasons playing in the top tier.
