= 1947–48 Dundee United F.C. season =

Dundee United
1947–48 season
- Chairman: J. Johnston-Grant
- Manager: Willie MacFadyen
- Stadium: Tannadice Park
- Scottish Second Division: 15th W10 D2 L18 F58 A88 P22
- Scottish Cup: Round 2
- League Cup: Group stage
- Supplementary Cup: Round 1

The 1947–48 season was the 41st year of football played by Dundee United, and covers the period from 1 July 1947 to 30 June 1948. United finished in fifteenth place in the Second Division.

== Match results ==
Dundee United played a total of 38 competitive matches during the 1947–48 season.

=== Legend ===
Win
Draw
Loss

All results are written with Dundee United's score first. Own goals in italics

=== Division B ===
Date	Opponent	Venue	Result	Attendance	Scorers
13 August 1947	Alloa Athletic	H	5–3	5,000	
27 August 1947	Albion Rovers	A	0–1	5,000	
20 September 1947	Stirling Albion	H	2–3	6,000	
27 September 1947	Kilmarnock	A	2–5	7,870	
4 October 1947	Arbroath	H	4–3	7,000	
18 October 1947	Dumbarton	H	0–1	7,000	
25 October 1947	Cowdenbeath	A	2–6	6,000	
1 November 1947	Stenhousemuir	H	4–2	5,000	
8 November 1947	Dunfermline Athletic	A	3–5	1,500	
15 November 1947	Leith Athletic	H	2–1	1,500	
22 November 1947	Hamilton Academical	H	3–2	7,000	
29 November 1947	Raith Rovers	A	1–5	8,000	
6 December 1947	St Johnstone	H	3–4	9,000	
13 December 1947	Ayr United	A	3–3	5,000	
20 December 1947	Alloa Athletic	A	1–3	6,000	
27 December 1947	Albion Rovers	H	3–0	7,000	
3 January 1948	Kilmarnock	H	2–3	11,000	
10 January 1948	Arbroath	A	0–6	4,500	
17 January 1948	East Fife	H	3–2	13,000	
24 January 1948	Stirling Albion	A	1–3	5,471	
31 January 1948	Dumbarton	A	2–3	2,500	
14 February 1948	Cowdenbeath	H	3–3	10,000	
28 February 1948	Dunfermline Athletic	H	0–4	10,000	
6 March 1948	Leith Athletic	A	0–1	1,500	
13 March 1948	Hamilton Academical	A	0–6	5,000	
20 March 1948	Raith Rovers	H	3–0	12,000	
27 March 1948	St Johnstone	A	1–0	5,000	
3 April 1948	Ayr United	H	4–2	11,000	
14 April 1948	East Fife	A	1–5	4,000	
24 April 1948	Stenhousemuir	A	0–3	1,000	

=== Scottish Cup ===
Date	Rd	Opponent	Venue	Result	Attendance	Scorers
7 February 1948	R2	Partick Thistle	A	3–4	12,500	

=== League Cup ===
Date	Rd	Opponent	Venue	Result	Attendance	Scorers
9 August 1947	G7	Albion Rovers	A	0–3	4,500	
16 August 1947	G7	Leith Athletic	H	2–2	5,000	
23 August 1947	G7	Cowdenbeath	H	0–2	3,000	
30 August 1947	G7	Albion Rovers	H	2–1	5,000	
6 September 1947	G7	Leith Athletic	A	1–3	4,500	
13 September 1947	G7	Cowdenbeath	A	0–1	4,000	

=== Supplementary Cup ===
Date	Rd	Opponent	Venue	Result	Attendance	Scorers
29 March 1948	R1	Airdrieonians	A	2–3		

== See also ==
- 1947–48 in Scottish football
