= Willie Finlay =

Scottish footballer and coach

Personal information
- Full name: William Morris Finlay
- Date of birth: 9 August 1926
- Place of birth: Auchterderran, Scotland
- Date of death: 4 September 2014 (aged 88)
- Place of death: Fife, Scotland
- Position: Centre half

Senior career*
Years	Team	Apps	(Gls)
- Bowhill Rovers
1946–1956	East Fife	282	(0)
1956–1963	Clyde	182	(3)
1963–1964	Raith Rovers	12	(0)
Total		476	(3)

Managerial career
- Lochore Welfare
- * Club domestic league appearances and goals

William Morris Finlay (9 August 1926 – 4 September 2014) was a Scottish professional football player and coach.

== Career ==
Born in Auchterderran, Finlay played as a centre half for Bowhill Rovers, East Fife, Clyde and Raith Rovers, making a total of 476 appearances in the Scottish Football League.

With East Fife he won the League Cup three times (1947–48, 1949–50, 1952–53) plus the 1947–48 Scottish Division Two title, two B Division Supplementary Cups and a Scottish Cup runners-up medal in 1949–50; with Clyde he won the Scottish Cup in 1957–58 plus two lower-tier titles (1956–57 and 1961–62). He was among the most highly regarded players of the period never selected to represent Scotland, though at the time there was a strong pool of local talent at various clubs across the country.

After retiring from playing he became manager of Lochore Welfare. He died in 2014, at which time he had been the longest-living member of East Fife's 'golden era' between the 1930s and 1950s.
