= 1949–50 Dundee United F.C. season =

Dundee United
1949–50 season
- Chairman: J. Johnston-Grant
- Manager: Willie MacFadyen
- Stadium: Tannadice Park
- Scottish Second Division: 7th W14 D5 L11 F74 A56 P33
- Scottish Cup: Round 2
- League Cup: Group stage
- Supplementary Cup: Round 1

The 1949–50 season was the 42nd year of football played by Dundee United, and covers the period from 1 July 1949 to 30 June 1950. United finished in seventh place in the Second Division.

== Match results ==
Dundee United played a total of 39 competitive matches during the 1949–50 season.

=== Legend ===
Win
Draw
Loss

All results are written with Dundee United's score first. Own goals in italics

=== Division B ===
Date	Opponent	Venue	Result	Attendance	Scorers
10 September 1949	Alloa Athletic	H	6–1	10,000	
24 September 1949	St Johnstone	H	3–1	13,000	
1 October 1949	Kilmarnock	A	2–3	6,383	
3 October 1949	Hamilton Academical	H	4–1	3,000	
8 October 1949	Dumbarton	H	5–0	12,000	
15 October 1949	Dunfermline Athletic	A	3–1	5,000	
22 October 1949	Arbroath	A	3–3	5,500	
29 October 1949	Cowdenbeath	H	2–2	14,000	
5 November 1949	Hamilton Academical	A	1–4	5,000	
12 November 1949	Forfar Athletic	H	0–2	10,000	
19 November 1949	Greenock Morton	A	2–5	9,000	
26 November 1949	Albion Rovers	H	2–5	10,000	
3 December 1949	Ayr United	A	4–0	3,000	
17 December 1949	Stenhousemuir	H	3–1	6,000	
24 December 1949	Alloa Athletic	A	3–3	2,500	
31 December 1949	Airdrieonians	H	0–1	10,000	
2 January 1950	St Johnstone	A	0–5	12,000	
3 January 1950	Kilmarnock	H	3–0	8,000	
7 January 1950	Dumbarton	A	0–3	3,000	
14 January 1950	Dunfermline Athletic	H	1–1	8,000	
21 January 1950	Arbroath	H	3–4	7,000	
4 February 1950	Cowdenbeath	A	1–2	4,500	
18 February 1950	Forfar Athletic	A	3–0	3,000	
25 February 1950	Greenock Morton	H	2–2	10,000	
4 March 1950	Albion Rovers	A	0–2	1,500	
11 March 1950	Ayr United	H	4–1	6,000	
25 March 1950	Stenhousemuir	A	5–1	400	
8 April 1950	Airdrieonians	A	0–2	4,500	
22 April 1950	Queen's Park	H	7–1	6,000	
29 April 1950	Queen's Park	A	1–0	1,953	

=== Scottish Cup ===
Date	Rd	Opponent	Venue	Result	Attendance	Scorers
28 January 1950	R1	Ayr United	H	4–0	8,000	
14 February 1950	R2	Partick Thistle	A	0–5	11,747	

=== League Cup ===
Date	Rd	Opponent	Venue	Result	Attendance	Scorers
13 August 1949	G6	Airdrieonians	A	2–5	8,000	
17 August 1949	G6	Dumbarton	H	5–1	10,000	
20 August 1949	G6	Arbroath	A	4–2	5,000	
27 August 1949	G6	Airdrieonians	H	6–0	16,000	
31 August 1949	G6	Dumbarton	A	1–3	1,000	
3 September 1949	G6	Arbroath	H	4–1	12,000	

=== Supplementary Cup ===
Date	Rd	Opponent	Venue	Result	Attendance	Scorers
12 September 1949	R1	Kilmarnock	A	3–4	McKay 3	

== See also ==
- 1949–50 in Scottish football
