= Bobby Black (Scottish footballer) =

Scottish footballer (1927–2012)

Personal information
- Date of birth: c. 1927
- Date of death: 4 June 2012 (aged 85)
- Place of death: Bristol, England
- Position: Outside right

Senior career*
Years	Team	Apps	(Gls)
1946–1952	East Fife	78	(23)
1952–1961	Queen of the South	273	(91)
Total		351	(114)

International career
1954	Scottish League XI	1	(2)
Medal record
East Fife FC
Runner-up	Scottish Cup	1950
- * Club domestic league appearances and goals

Bobby Black (c.1927 – 4 June 2012) was a Scottish footballer who played as an outside right for East Fife and Queen of the South and was also capped by the Scottish League. Black later was an all England bowls champion.

== East Fife ==
Black was from Thornhill, Dumfries and Galloway. Having played at East Fife during undoubtedly the best period in the club's history Black won a League Cup medal with them in 1949–50. The Methil side made the Scottish Cup final that season and finished fourth in Scotland's top division. Two seasons later (Bobby Black's last at the club) they would surpass this league position and finish third – an achievement unsurpassed by the club and equalled only once.

Other players at the club in this era included 1938 Scottish Cup winners with East Fife Tommy Adams and Willie Laird and players who played for Scotland while with the club, Allan Brown, Henry Morris, George Aitken, Davie Duncan, Charlie Fleming and Andy Matthew. Jimmy Philp was another like Black who enjoyed Scottish League Cup success with the Methil club.

From his first year playing for East Fife, the 1946–47 season, until his departure in 1952, Black scored 23 goals in 78 league matches.

== Queen of the South ==
In 1952, Black signed for his local senior club Queen of the South in Dumfries. Black departed the Dumfries club in 1961 after 346 appearances and 120 goals scored. Black is the third highest all-time goalscorer for the club, behind Jim Patterson with 252 goals and Stephen Dobbie with 166 goals.

Under the management of Jimmy McKinnell Junior at Queens, a large part of Black's career at Queens included a large part of the most successful period in the club's history. Also at Queens at this time were goalkeeper Roy Henderson, full backs Dougie Sharpe and Jimmy Binning and the club's record scorer Jim Patterson with 251 goals. Consistent mid-table finishes in the top division in the early and mid 1950s peaked with a sixth-place finish in 1956 – a finish surpassed only once in the club's history. Queen's were subsequently relegated to the Scottish Second Division in 1959.

Black's displays at outside right were recognised at international level when he was capped for the Scottish League XI versus the League of Ireland XI in Dublin in 1954 and notched two goals in a 3–1 victory. Black's son, Robert, played for the Doonhamers between 1971 and 1973 making 35 appearances and scored four goals. Bobby's other son, Russell was also a footballer, playing for Sheffield United and Halifax Town. In his two seasons with the Shaymen he scored 14 goals in 72 league appearances.

Black's grandson Jamie Paterson was also a footballer who played for Scunthorpe United, Halifax Town and Doncaster Rovers in the senior ranks and with Barrow in non-league football.

Black played his entire career wearing the same pair of football boots. Black's preference was to have his boots repaired rather than replacing them and his football boots are now on display in the Doonhamers Museum at Palmerston Park.

== Later years ==
After leaving Queen of the South Black played non-league football for Bath City and Bridgwater Town in England. In his later years he lived in Somerset until he died on 4 June 2012 aged 85.

Black's great-grandson is Greenock Morton striker Denny Johnstone.
