= 1949–50 Scottish Cup =

Tournament details
- Country: Scotland

Final positions
- Champions: Rangers
- Runners-up: East Fife

The 1949–50 Scottish Cup was the 65th staging of Scotland's most prestigious football knockout competition. The Cup was won by Rangers who defeated East Fife in the final.

== First round ==
Home team	Score	Away team
Alloa Athletic	0 – 1	Albion Rovers
Brechin City	0 – 3	Celtic
Clachnacuddin	2 – 3	Stenhousemuir
Clyde	4 – 3	Newton Stewart
Cowdenbeath	1 – 0	Hamilton Academical
Dumbarton	1 – 0	Queen's Park
Dundee United	4 – 0	Ayr United
Dunfermline Athletic	5 – 3	Forfar Athletic
East Fife	4 – 0	Fraserburgh
Hearts	1 – 1	Dundee
Hibernian	0 – 1	Partick Thistle
Inverness Caledonian	0 – 1	Queen of the South
Kilmarnock	1 – 1	Stirling Albion
Motherwell	2 – 4	Rangers
Raith Rovers	3 – 0	Airdrieonians
Ross County	0 – 3	Greenock Morton
St Johnstone	7 – 3	Leith Athletic
St Mirren	1 – 2	Aberdeen
Stranraer	1 – 3	Falkirk
Third Lanark	2 – 1	Arbroath

=== Replays ===
Home team	Score	Away team
Dundee	1 – 2	Hearts
Stirling Albion	3 – 1	Kilmarnock

== Second round ==
Home team	Score	Away team
Albion Rovers	1 – 2	Dunfermline Athletic
Third Lanark	1 – 1	Celtic
Partick Thistle	5 – 0	Dundee United
Aberdeen	3 – 1	Hearts
Falkirk	2 – 3	East Fife
Queen of the South	1 – 1	Greenock Morton
Raith Rovers	3 – 2	Clyde
Rangers	8 – 0	Cowdenbeath
Stenhousemuir	2 – 2	St Johnstone
Stirling Albion	2 – 2	Dumbarton

=== Replays ===
Home team	Score	Away team
Celtic	4 – 1	Third Lanark
Dumbarton	1 – 1	Stirling Albion
Greenock Morton	0 – 3	Queen of the South
St Johnstone	2 – 4	Stenhousemuir

==== Second Replays ====
Home team	Score	Away team
Stirling Albion	6 – 2	Dumbarton

== Third round ==
Home team	Score	Away team
Celtic	0 – 1	Aberdeen
Dunfermline Athletic	1 – 4	Stenhousemuir

== Quarter-finals ==
Home team	Score	Away team
Partick Thistle	5 – 1	Stirling Albion
Queen of the South	3 – 3	Aberdeen
Rangers	1 – 1	Raith Rovers
Stenhousemuir	0 – 3	East Fife

=== Replays ===
Home team	Score	Away team
Aberdeen	1 – 2	Queen of the South
Raith Rovers	1 – 1	Rangers

==== Second Replays ====
Home team	Score	Away team
Rangers	2 – 0	Raith Rovers

== Semi-finals ==
1 April 1950

Partick Thistle	1 – 2	East Fife

Attendance: 42,000

1 April 1950

Rangers	1 – 1	Queen of the South

Attendance: 52,924

=== Replays ===
5 April 1950

Rangers	3 – 0	Queen of the South

Attendance: 58,975

== Final ==
22 April 1950

Rangers	3 – 0	East Fife
Thornton; Findlay 1'	Soccerbase

Hampden Park, Glasgow
Attendance: 118,262
Referee: Jack Mowat

=== Teams ===
RANGERS:
GK	(Scotland) Bobby Brown
RB	(Scotland) George Young
LB	(Scotland) Jock Shaw
RH	(Scotland) Ian McColl
CH	(Scotland) Willie Woodburn
LH	(Scotland) Sammy Cox
RW	(Scotland) Eddie Rutherford
IR	(Scotland) Willie Findlay
CF	(Scotland) Willie Thornton
IL	(Scotland) Jimmy Duncanson
LW	(Scotland) Willie Rae
Manager:
(Scotland) Bill Struth

EAST FIFE:
GK	(Scotland) Gordon Easson
RB	(Scotland) Willie Laird
LB	(Scotland) Sammy Stewart
RH	(Scotland) Jimmy Philp
CH	(Scotland) Willie Finlay
LH	(Scotland) George Aitken
RW	(Scotland) Bobby Black
IR	(Scotland) Charlie Fleming
CF	(Scotland) Henry Morris
IL	(Scotland) Allan Brown
LW	(Scotland) Davie Duncan
Manager:
(Scotland) Scot Symon

== See also ==
- 1949–50 in Scottish football
- 1949–50 Scottish League Cup
