= 1946–47 Dundee United F.C. season =

Dundee United
1946–47 season
- Chairman: J. Johnston-Grant
- Manager: Willie MacFadyen
- Stadium: Tannadice Park
- Scottish Second Division: 10th W9 D4 L13 F53 A60 P22
- Scottish Cup: Round 1
- League Cup: Quarter-final
- Supplementary Cup: Semi-final

The 1946–47 season was the 40th year of football played by Dundee United, and covers the period from 1 July 1946 to 30 June 1947. United finished in tenth place in the Second Division.

== Match results ==
Dundee United played a total of 39 competitive matches during the 1946–47 season.

=== Legend ===
Win
Draw
Loss

All results are written with Dundee United's score first. Own goals in italics

=== Division B ===
Date	Opponent	Venue	Result	Attendance	Scorers
10 August 1946	Dunfermline Athletic	H	3–0	13,000	
17 August 1946	Ayr United	A	3–3	4,500	
24 August 1946	Dundee	H	1–2	21,000	
31 August 1946	St Johnstone	A	1–3	7,000	
7 September 1946	Albion Rovers	H	1–3	13,000	
14 September 1946	Raith Rovers	A	1–1	8,000	
2 November 1946	Airdrieonians	H	1–2	13,000	
9 November 1946	Alloa Athletic	A	1–4	3,500	
16 November 1946	Dumbarton	H	2–1	5,000	
23 November 1946	East Fife	H	2–1	11,000	
30 November 1946	Stenhousemuir	A	2–3	800	
7 December 1946	Arbroath	H	1–3	8,000	
14 December 1946	Cowdenbeath	H	3–2	6,000	
21 December 1946	Dunfermline Athletic	A	3–4	1,500	
28 December 1946	Ayr United	H	5–1	10,000	
1 January 1947	Dundee	A	0–2	24,000	
2 January 1947	St Johnstone	H	2–4	12,000	
4 January 1947	Dumbarton	A	2–0	1,000	
11 January 1947	Alloa Athletic	H	6–2	3,000	
18 January 1947	Arbroath	A	4–5	5,000	
1 February 1947	East Fife	A	2–1	3,000	
29 March 1947	Cowdenbeath	A	1–1	3,000	
12 April 1947	Stenhousemuir	H	2–2	4,000	
14 April 1947	Raith Rovers	H	3–0	8,000	
19 April 1947	Airdrieonians	A	0–5	5,000	
3 May 1947	Albion Rovers	A	1–5	600	

=== Scottish Cup ===
Date	Rd	Opponent	Venue	Result	Attendance	Scorers
25 January 1947	R1	Queen's Park	A	0–3	10,207	

=== League Cup ===
Date	Rd	Opponent	Venue	Result	Attendance	Scorers
21 September 1946	G7	Cowdenbeath	H	2–0	10,000	
28 September 1946	G7	Dumbarton	A	3–0	3,500	
5 October 1946	G7	Arbroath	A	3–1	6,000	
12 October 1946	G7	Cowdenbeath	A	1–4	3,000	
19 October 1946	G7	Dumbarton	H	2–1	11,000	
26 October 1946	G7	Arbroath	H	2–1	12,000	
1 March 1947	QF L1	Rangers	A	1–2	40,000	
5 March 1947	QF L2	Rangers	H	1–1	18,000	

=== Supplementary Cup ===
Date	Rd	Opponent	Venue	Result	Attendance	Scorers
14 August 1946	R1 L1	Stenhousemuir	H	1–1		
21 August 1946	R1 L2	Stenhousemuir	A	1–0		
28 August 1946	QF	St Johnstone	H	4–1		
4 September 1946	SF	East Fife	H	2–4		

== See also ==
- 1946–47 in Scottish football
