= 1949–50 Celtic F.C. season =

Celtic
1949–50 season
- Manager: Jimmy McGrory
- Stadium: Celtic Park
- Scottish Division A: 5th
- Scottish Cup: Third round
- Scottish League Cup: Group stage

During the 1949–50 Scottish football season, Celtic competed in Scottish Division A.

== Competitions ==
=== Scottish Division A ===
==== League table ====
Pos	Team	Pld	W	D	L	GF	GA	GD	Pts
3	Hearts	30	20	3	7	86	40	+46	43
4	East Fife	30	15	7	8	58	43	+15	37
5	Celtic	30	14	7	9	51	50	+1	35
6	Dundee	30	12	7	11	49	46	+3	31
7	Partick Thistle	30	13	3	14	55	45	+10	29

Source: RSSSF

==== Matches ====
10 September 1949 Division A	Queen of the South	0–2	Celtic	Dumfries
				Stadium: Palmerston Park; Attendance: 20,250

17 September 1949 Division A	Celtic	3–2	Heart of Midlothian	Glasgow
				Stadium: Celtic Park; Attendance: 30,000

24 September 1949 Division A	Rangers	4–0	Celtic	Glasgow
				Stadium: Ibrox Park; Attendance: 64,000

1 October 1949 Division A	Celtic	2–2	Raith Rovers	Glasgow
				Stadium: Celtic Park; Attendance: 30,000

8 October 1949 Division A	Motherwell	1–2	Celtic	Motherwell
				Stadium: Fir Park; Attendance: 30,000

15 October 1949 Division A	Celtic	4–2	Aberdeen	Glasgow
15:00				Stadium: Celtic Park; Attendance: 30,000

22 October 1949 Division A	Dundee	3–0	Celtic	Dundee
				Stadium: Dens Park; Attendance: 35,000

29 October 1949 Division A	Celtic	2–2	Hibernian	Glasgow
				Stadium: Celtic Park; Attendance: 45,000

5 November 1949 Division A	Celtic	4–1	Clyde	Glasgow
				Stadium: Celtic Park; Attendance: 35,000

12 November 1949 Division A	Stilring Albion	2–1	Celtic	Stirling
				Stadium: Annfield; Attendance: 25,800

19 November 1949 Division A	Celtic	2–1	Third Lanark	Glasgow
				Stadium: Celtic Park; Attendance: 18,000

26 November 1949 Division A	Falkirk	1–1	Celtic	Falkirk
				Stadium: Brockville Park; Attendance: 20,000

3 December 1949 Division A	Celtic	1–0	Partick Thistle	Glasgow
				Stadium: Celtic Park; Attendance: 25,000

10 December 1949 Division A	Celtic	0–0	St Mirren	Glasgow
				Stadium: Celtic Park; Attendance: 30,000

17 December 1949 Division A	East Fife	5–1	Celtic	Methil
				Stadium: Bayview Park; Attendance: 14,000

24 December 1949 Division A	Celtic	3–0	Queen of the South	Glasgow
				Stadium: Celtic Park; Attendance: 14,000

31 December 1949 Division A	Hearts	4–2	Celtic	Edinburgh
				Stadium: Tynecastle Park; Attendance: 44,283

2 January 1950 Division A	Celtic	1–1	Rangers	Glasgow
				Stadium: Celtic Park; Attendance: 44,000

3 January 1950 Division A	Raith Rovers	1–1	Celtic	Kirkcaldy
				Stadium: Stark's Park; Attendance: 20,000

7 January 1950 Division A	Celtic	3–1	Motherwell	Glasgow
				Stadium: Celtic Park; Attendance: 40,000

14 January 1950 Division A	Aberdeen	4–0	Celtic	Aberdeen
				Stadium: Pittodrie Park; Attendance: 25,000

21 January 1950 Division A	Celtic	2–0	Dundee	Glasgow
				Stadium: Celtic Park; Attendance: 25,000

4 February 1950 Division A	Hibernian	4–1	Celtic	Edinburgh
				Stadium: Easter Road; Attendance: 41,000

18 February 1950 Division A	Celtic	2–1	Stirling Albion	Glasgow
				Stadium: Celtic Park; Attendance: 20,000

4 March 1950 Division A	Celtic	4–3	Falkirk	Glasgow
				Stadium: Celtic Park; Attendance: 16,000

11 March 1950 Division A	Third Lanark	1–0	Celtic	Glasgow
				Stadium: Cathkin Park; Attendance: 20,000

18 March 1950 Division A	St Mirren	0–1	Celtic	Paisley
				Stadium: St Mirren Park; Attendance: 20,000

25 March 1950 Division A	Celtic	4–1	East Fife	Glasgow
				Stadium: Celtic Park; Attendance: 25,000

10 April 1950 Division A	Partick Thistle	1–0	Celtic	Glasgow
15:00 BST				Stadium: Firhill Park; Attendance: 34,000

15 April 1950 Division A	Clyde	2–2	Celtic	Glasgow
				Stadium: Shawfield Stadium; Attendance: 25,000

=== Scottish Cup ===
28 January 1950 First round	Brechin City	0–3	Celtic	Brechin
				Stadium: Glebe Park; Attendance: 6,500

15 February 1950 Second round	Third Lanark	1–1	Celtic	Glasgow
				Stadium: Cathkin Park; Attendance: 35,000

20 February 1950 Second round replay	Celtic	4–1	Third Lanark	Glasgow
				Stadium: Celtic Park; Attendance: 33,000

25 February 1950 Third round	Celtic	0–1	Aberdeen	Glasgow
				Stadium: Celtic Park; Attendance: 65,112

=== Scottish League Cup ===
13 August 1949 Group 8	Celtic	3–2	Rangers	Glasgow
				Stadium: Celtic Park; Attendance: 71,000

17 August 1949 Group 8	Aberdeen	4–5	Celtic	Aberdeen
				Stadium: Pittodrie Park; Attendance: 38,000

20 August 1949 Group 8	St Mirren	1–0	Celtic	Paisley
				Stadium: St Mirren Park, Love Street; Attendance: 47,438

27 August 1949 Group 8	Rangers	2–0	Celtic	Glasgow
				Stadium: Ibrox Park; Attendance: 95,000

31 August 1949 Group 8	Celtic	1–3	Aberdeen	Glasgow
				Stadium: Celtic Park; Attendance: 15,000

3 September 1949 Group 8	Celtic	4–1	St Mirren	Glasgow
				Stadium: Celtic Park; Attendance: 30,000
