= 1949 Scottish League Cup final =

1949 Scottish League Cup final may refer to one of two Scottish League Cup finals played in 1949:

- 1949 Scottish League Cup final (March), final of the 1948–49 Scottish League Cup, Rangers 2–0 Raith Rovers
- 1949 Scottish League Cup final (October), final of the 1949–50 Scottish League Cup, East Fife 3–0 Dunfermline Athletic
