= 1948–49 Dundee United F.C. season =

Dundee United
1948–49 season
- Chairman: J. Johnston-Grant
- Manager: Willie MacFadyen
- Stadium: Tannadice Park
- Scottish Second Division: 8th W10 D7 L13 F60 A67 P27
- Scottish Cup: Round 2
- League Cup: Group stage
- Supplementary Cup: Round 1

The 1948–49 season was the 41st year of football played by Dundee United, and covers the period from 1 July 1948 to 30 June 1949. United finished in eighth place in the Second Division.

== Match results ==
Dundee United played a total of 39 competitive matches during the 1948–49 season.

=== Legend ===
Win
Draw
Loss

All results are written with Dundee United's score first. Own goals in italics

=== Division B ===
Date	Opponent	Venue	Result	Attendance	Scorers
14 August 1948	Dumbarton	A	2–3	5,000	
18 August 1948	Dunfermline Athletic	H	0–1	6,000	
21 August 1948	St Johnstone	A	0–3	6,500	
28 August 1948	Airdrieonians	H	1–3	10,000	
1 September 1948	Alloa Athletic	A	3–3	2,500	
4 September 1948	Kilmarnock	H	4–1	8,000	
23 October 1948	Arbroath	H	5–5	9,000	
30 October 1948	Cowdenbeath	A	3–2	2,500	
6 November 1948	Raith Rovers	H	1–4	12,000	
13 November 1948	Stirling Albion	A	2–5	4,178	
20 November 1948	East Stirlingshire	H	1–1	5,000	
27 November 1948	Hamilton Academical	A	4–2	5,000	
4 December 1948	Ayr United	H	1–2	7,000	
11 December 1948	Queen's Park	H	5–2	7,500	
18 December 1948	Stenhousemuir	A	2–3	2,000	
25 December 1948	Dunfermline Athletic	A	0–2	4,500	
1 January 1949	St Johnstone	H	4–3	13,000	
3 January 1949	Airdrieonians	A	1–1	7,000	
8 January 1949	Dumbarton	H	4–0	8,000	
15 January 1949	Kilmarnock	A	3–3	6,347	
29 January 1949	Alloa Athletic	H	5–1	7,000	
12 February 1949	Cowdenbeath	H	2–1	6,000	
19 February 1949	Raith Rovers	A	3–1	9,000	
26 February 1949	Stirling Albion	H	0–1	11,000	
5 March 1949	East Stirlingshire	A	0–3	700	
12 March 1949	Hamilton Academical	H	2–2	7,000	
19 March 1949	Ayr United	A	0–8	6,000	
2 April 1949	Stenhousemuir	H	2–0	5,000	
9 April 1949	Arbroath	A	0–1	4,000	
20 April 1949	Queen's Park	A	0–0	2,074	

=== Scottish Cup ===
Date	Rd	Opponent	Venue	Result	Attendance	Scorers
22 January 1949	R1	Celtic	H	4–3	25,000	
5 February 1949	R2	Dumbarton	A	1–1	9,000	
9 February 1949	R2	Dumbarton	H	1–3	10,000	

=== League Cup ===
Date	Rd	Opponent	Venue	Result	Attendance	Scorers
11 September 1948	G7	St Johnstone	A	1–1	6,000	
18 September 1948	G7	Stenhousemuir	H	4–2	9,000	
25 September 1948	G7	Hamilton Academical	H	1–2	5,000	
2 October 1948	G7	St Johnstone	H	4–2	11,000	
9 October 1948	G7	Stenhousemuir	A	1–2	2,500	
16 October 1948	G7	Hamilton Academical	A	3–6	5,000	

=== Supplementary Cup ===
Date	Rd	Opponent	Venue	Result	Attendance	Scorers
15 September 1948	R1	Airdrieonians	A	0–3		

== See also ==
- 1948–49 in Scottish football
