= 1947 Scottish League Cup final =

There were two Scottish League Cup finals played in 1947:

- 1947 Scottish League Cup final (April), final of the 1946–47 Scottish League Cup, Rangers 4–0 Aberdeen
- 1947 Scottish League Cup final (October), final of the 1947–48 Scottish League Cup, East Fife 4–0 Falkirk (replay after 0–0 draw)
