= Gordon Easson =

Scottish footballer (1928–2009)

James Gordon Easson (2 July 1928 – 26 November 2009) was a Scottish footballer, who played as a goalkeeper for East Fife and Worcester City.

Easson was born in Windygates on 2 July 1928. He made his first team debut for East Fife in the 1950 Scottish Cup Final. This happened because their first two choice goalkeepers, John Niven and John McGarrity, were both injured. Easson conceded a goal within 30 seconds and East Fife went on to lose 3–0.

Easson died in Kirkcaldy on 26 November 2009, at the age of 81.
