= Willie Findlay =

Scottish footballer

Personal information
- Full name: William Findlay
- Date of birth: 15 November 1922
- Place of birth: Motherwell, Scotland
- Date of death: 6 January 2001 (aged 78)
- Place of death: Hamilton, Scotland
- Position: Inside right

Senior career*
Years	Team	Apps	(Gls)
–	Dalziel Works		
–	Blantyre Victoria		
1941–1947	Albion Rovers		
1947–1954	Rangers	70	(37)
1954–1955	Albion Rovers		
- * Club domestic league appearances and goals

William Findlay (15 November 1922 – 6 January 2001) was a Scottish football player who played as an inside right.

Motherwell-born Findlay began his career with Scottish junior club Blantyre Victoria before moving to join Scottish Football League club Albion Rovers in December 1941. Findlay became recognized as one of the finest players ever to appear for the Cliftonhill side, forming a strong partnership on the right wing with Johnny McIlhatton.

Findlay's showings for Rovers earned him a £7,500 move to Rangers in April 1947. His spell at the Gers included scoring in the 1950 Scottish Cup Final in a 3–0 win over East Fife after only 26 seconds, which remains a record for the event. Findlay also scored in the 1951 Scottish League Cup Final, a 3–2 defeat by Dundee. During his time at Ibrox he netted 65 goals in 114 appearances in the three major competitions and won medals for both the League championship (1948–49 and 1949–50) and the Scottish Cup (1947–48 and 1949–50) – he contributed to two other cup wins but did not take part in the finals.

He returned to Albion Rovers in the 1954–55 season for a few months.
