= Bobby Bolt =

Scottish footballer (1912–1991)

Personal information
- Full name: Robert Bolt
- Date of birth: 29 January 1912
- Place of birth: Lochgelly, Scotland
- Date of death: 1991 (aged 78–79)
- Place of death: Inverness, Scotland
- Position: Right half

Senior career*
Years	Team	Apps	(Gls)
–	Rosslyn Juniors		
1933–1935	Heart of Midlothian	1	(0)
1934–1935	→ Dunfermline Athletic (loan)	21	(0)
1935–1937	Dunfermline Athletic	71	(2)
1937–1939	Falkirk	76	(8)
1939–1944	Rangers	0	(0)
1944–1947	Third Lanark	21	(0)
1947–1948	Falkirk	21	(2)
1948–1952	Caledonian		

International career
1940	Scotland (wartime)	1	(0)
- * Club domestic league appearances and goals

Robert Bolt (29 January 1912 – 1991) was a Scottish footballer who played as a right half.

== Career ==
Born in Lochgelly, Fife, Bolt began his professional career with Heart of Midlothian, then played for Dunfermline Athletic and Falkirk where he impressed sufficiently to be selected for a Scottish Football Association tour of North America in May 1939, following which he was recruited by Rangers, the defending national champions. However, within months World War II broke out, rendering all his subsequent 79 appearances for the Gers unofficial. In that period he was selected for Scotland in an international against a League of Ireland XI in 1940, but would never receive a full cap for his country.

Bolt had also made wartime appearances for Third Lanark, and he remained with the south Glasgow club for one season upon the resumption of official competitions before returning to Falkirk for another year, during which he played in the Scottish League Cup Final defeat to East Fife.

Latterly he relocated to Inverness where he turned out for Caledonian in the Highland League and played against Dundee United in the Scottish Cup in January 1952, the day after his 40th birthday. His son, also Bobby, also played for the club.
