= 1947–48 Scottish Division B =

Scottish Division B
- Season: 1947–48
- Champions: East Fife
- Promoted: East Fife; Albion Rovers

The 1947–48 Scottish Division B was won by East Fife who, along with second placed Albion Rovers, were promoted to the Division A. Leith Athletic finished bottom and were relegated.

== Table ==
Pos	Team	Pld	W	D	L	GF	GA	GD	Pts	Promotion or relegation
1	East Fife	30	25	3	2	103	36	+67	53	Promotion to the 1948–49 Division A
2	Albion Rovers	30	19	4	7	58	49	+9	42	Promotion to the 1948–49 Division A
3	Hamilton Academical	30	17	6	7	75	45	+30	40	
4	Raith Rovers	30	14	6	10	83	66	+17	34	
5	Cowdenbeath	30	12	8	10	56	53	+3	32	
6	Kilmarnock	30	13	4	13	72	62	+10	30	
7	Dunfermline Athletic	30	13	3	14	72	71	+1	29	
8	Stirling Albion	30	11	6	13	65	66	−1	28	
9	St Johnstone	30	11	5	14	69	63	+6	27	
10	Ayr United	30	9	9	12	59	61	−2	27	
11	Alloa Athletic	30	10	6	14	56	77	−21	26	
12	Dumbarton	30	9	7	14	66	79	−13	25	
13	Arbroath	30	10	3	17	55	62	−7	23	
14	Stenhousemuir	30	6	11	13	53	83	−30	23	
15	Dundee United	30	10	2	18	58	88	−30	22	
16	Leith Athletic	30	6	7	17	45	84	−39	19	Relegated to the 1948–49 Division C

Source: "1947-1948 Division B - SPFL Archive". SPFL.
