= Gerry Mays =

Scottish footballer and manager

Personal information
- Date of birth: 18 July 1921
- Place of birth: Craigneuk, Scotland
- Date of death: 20 March 2006 (aged 84)
- Place of death: Bellshill, Lanarkshire
- Position: Inside forward

Youth career
- Shieldmuir Celtic

Senior career*
Years	Team	Apps	(Gls)
1939–1941	Hibernian	0	(0)
1947–1948	St Johnstone	14	(5)
1949–1952	Dunfermline Athletic	89	(50)
1952–1959	Kilmarnock	152	(79)
Total		102	(13)

Managerial career
- 1961–1962: Ayr United.
- * Club domestic league appearances and goals

Gerry Mays (18 July 1921 – 20 March 2006) was a Scottish football player and manager. He played for Hibernian, St Johnstone, Dunfermline Athletic and Kilmarnock, and then managed Ayr United. Mays appeared for Kilmarnock in the 1957 Scottish Cup Final and 1952 Scottish League Cup Final, and for Dunfermline in the 1949–50 Scottish League Cup Final.
