= Jim Moffat =

Scottish footballer and manager

Personal information
- Date of birth: 27 January 1960 (age 66)
- Place of birth: Dunfermline, Scotland
- Position: Goalkeeper

Senior career*
Years	Team	Apps	(Gls)
1977–1981	Montrose	106	(0)
1981–1983	Hamilton Academical	5	(0)
1983	Dunfermline Athletic	6	(0)
1983–1989	Forfar Athletic	62	(0)
1987	→ Montrose (loan)	4	(0)
1988	→ East Fife (loan)	1	(0)
1989	Brechin City	1	(0)
1989–1993	East Fife	34	(0)
1993	Montrose	12	(0)
1993–1994	Cowdenbeath	17	(0)
1994–1995	East Stirlingshire	14	(0)
1995–1996	Albion Rovers	21	(0)
1996–1998	Cowdenbeath	4	(0)
1998–2001	Forfar Athletic	15	(0)
Total		302	(0)

Managerial career
- 2002–2006: East Fife
- 2007–2008: Forfar Athletic
- 2009–2010: Montrose (assistant)
- * Club domestic league appearances and goals

James Moffat (born 27 January 1960) is a Scottish former footballer, goalkeeper and manager, currently the East Fife Goalkeeper coach.

He played as a goalkeeper for several Scottish lower league clubs. After retiring from playing in 2001, Moffat was appointed as the assistant manager at Stirling Albion.

He then became the manager of East Fife in 2002. He achieved promotion from the Third Division in 2003, but the club were relegated in the following season. He was sacked in 2006 after a run of defeats.

He was appointed manager of Forfar in March 2007, but was sacked in April 2008 with the side just one point above last place in the Third Division.

Jim Moffat was appointed as Steven Tweed's assistant joining the club in June 2009 from Tayport Juniors where he held a similar position.

On 3 June 2010, Montrose boss Steven Tweed decided to part company with his assistant, the former East Fife and Forfar manager Jim Moffat. The duo had teamed up at Links Park twelve months prior as Tweed looked to have an old head on board as he started his first full season as a player/manager.

In June 2024 he was hired as Goalkeeper Coach at Cowdenbeath then moved to East Fife on 24 October 2024 in a similar position where he once was a goalkeeper and manager of the club before.

== Personal life ==
Moffat was a principal teacher of physical education at St Columba's Roman Catholic High School in Dunfermline, Fife. He was principal teacher of physical education at Bell Baxter High School in Cupar in late 1990s to early 2010s.

== Honours ==
East Fife

- Scottish Third Division promotion : 2002-03
- Fife Cup (2) : 2004-05, 2005–06
