= Jim Cannon (footballer, born 1927) =

Scottish footballer

Personal information
- Full name: James Cannon
- Date of birth: 19 March 1927
- Place of birth: Coatbridge, Scotland
- Date of death: 26 January 1991 (aged 63)
- Place of death: Airdrie, Scotland
- Position: Inside forward

Senior career*
Years	Team	Apps	(Gls)
–	Blantyre Victoria		(0)
1948–1951	Dunfermline Athletic	70	(27)
1951–1954	St Johnstone	25	(7)
1954–1955	Kettering Town		
1955–1956	Albion Rovers	4	(1)
1956–1957	Darlington	12	(1)
- * Club domestic league appearances and goals

James Cannon (19 March 1927 – 26 January 1991) was a Scottish footballer who made 99 appearances in the Scottish Football League for Dunfermline Athletic, with whom he played on the losing side in the 1949 Scottish League Cup Final, St Johnstone and Albion Rovers, and 12 appearances in the English Football League for Darlington. An inside forward, he began his career with Blantyre Victoria, and also played for English Southern League club Kettering Town, for whom he scored five times from 21 appearances in all competitions.

Dunfermline teammate Willie McSeveney described him as "one of the cleverest footballers that I have ever seen in my life. He was the guy who invented dummies, he let the ball go through his legs, things like that."
