= Gavin Murray =

Scottish footballer and manager

Personal information
- Date of birth: 4 August 1957 (age 69)
- Place of birth: Dunfermline, Scotland
- Position: Forward

Youth career
- Bellhaven Athletic

Senior career*
Years	Team	Apps	(Gls)
1977–1978	Clydebank	2	(1)
1978–1979	Kirkintilloch Rob Roy		
1979–1984	Stenhousemuir	160	(47)
1984–1987	East Fife	75	(21)
Total		237	(69)

Managerial career
- 1987–1993: East Fife
- * Club domestic league appearances and goals

Gavin Murray (born 4 August 1957) is a Scottish football player and manager. Murray played for Scottish Football League clubs Clydebank, Stenhousemuir and East Fife in the 1970s and 1980s. He then managed East Fife between 1987 and 1993.
