= Jim Fiddes =

Scottish footballer (1916–1970)

Personal information
- Full name: James Fiddes
- Date of birth: 3 October 1916
- Place of birth: Grangemouth, Scotland
- Date of death: 1970 (aged 53)
- Place of death: Falkirk, Scotland
- Positions: Outside right; inside right; right half

Senior career*
Years	Team	Apps	(Gls)
–	Grange Rovers		
1934–1940	Rangers	57	(14)
1940–1951	Falkirk	134	(15)
1951–1952	Ross County		
1952–1953	Stenhousemuir		
- * Club domestic league appearances and goals

James Fiddes BEM (3 October 1916 – 1970) was a Scottish footballer; he was a versatile player who featured at outside right, inside right and right half during his career.

Born in Grangemouth, Fiddes served in the Royal Air Force during the Second World War and played for Rangers, Falkirk and Stenhousemuir. Having won a Scottish Cup (1936) and a Scottish Football League title (1938–39) with Rangers before the war, he also played for Falkirk in the 1947–48 Scottish League Cup Final.

After retiring from football in the 1950s, he joined BP as a tanker driver at Grangemouth Refinery. He became a prominent member of the Transport and General Workers' Union, serving as chairman, secretary, collector and shop steward of 7/51 Branch at the depot and by 1970 as chairman of the TGWU's Commercial Services Group.

Fiddes was awarded the British Empire Medal (BEM) in the 1970 New Year Honours for his services to the petroleum industry and the TGWU.
