= Jack Davidson (Scottish footballer) =

Scottish footballer (1920–1970)

Personal information
- Full name: John Alexander Davidson
- Date of birth: 5 December 1920
- Place of birth: Dundee, Scotland
- Date of death: 1970 (aged 49)
- Place of death: Bradford, England
- Position: Inside forward

Youth career
- Dundee Violet

Senior career*
Years	Team	Apps	(Gls)
1946–1947	Dundee United	10	(2)
1947–1950	East Fife	48	(24)
1950–1951	Kilmarnock	6	(1)
1951–?	Rhyl		
Total		64	(27)
- * Club domestic league appearances and goals

John Alexander Davidson (5 December 1920 – 1970), better known as Jack Davidson, was a Scottish footballer who played as an inside forward for Dundee United, East Fife and Kilmarnock. Davidson helped East Fife win the 1947–48 Scottish League Cup.

== Personal life ==
John Alexander Davidson was born in Lochee, Dundee on 5 December 1920, the son of Peter and Helen Davidson. On 4 November 1949, he married Ida Cappucci, a singer, at the Royal British Hotel in Dundee. He died in Bradford, England in 1970, aged 49.
