= Dave Clarke (Scottish footballer) =

Scottish footballer and manager

David Clarke (born 6 June 1950) is a Scottish former football player and manager. Clarke played for East Fife for his whole career, making over 500 league appearances. He holds the club record for most appearances, with 627 in all competitions. Clarke has also managed East Fife, in two different spells, and Falkirk.
