= Methil power station =

Coal-fired power station in Fife, Scotland, UK

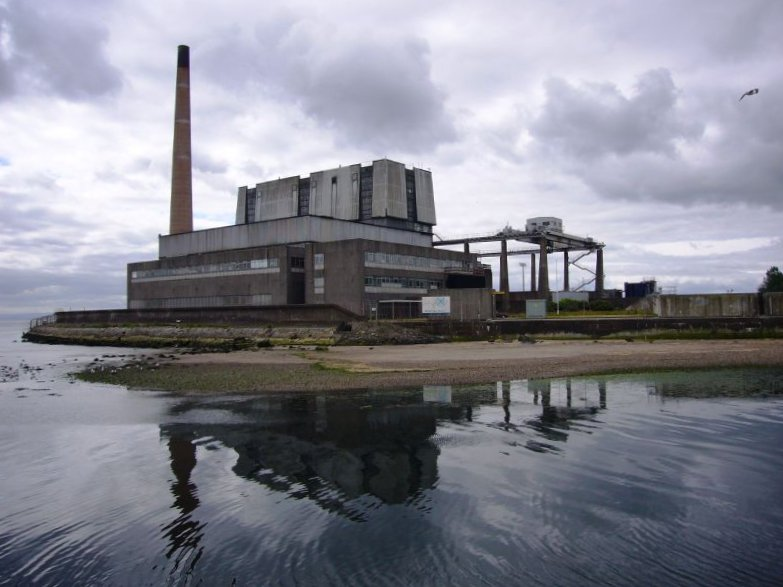
- The station in July 2006
- Country: Scotland
- Location: Levenmouth, Fife
- Coordinates: 56.190918°N 2.996732°W
- Status: Demolished
- Commission date: 1965
- Decommission date: 2000
- Operator: South of Scotland Electricity Board

Thermal power station
- Primary fuel: Coal

External links
- Commons: Related media on Commons

Methil Power Station was a small base load coal slurry-fired power station in the town of Methil, Fife, Scotland. It was situated on the south side of the mouth of the River Leven, where the river enters the Firth of Forth.

It was a local landmark, with the chimney visible for some distance.

== Design ==
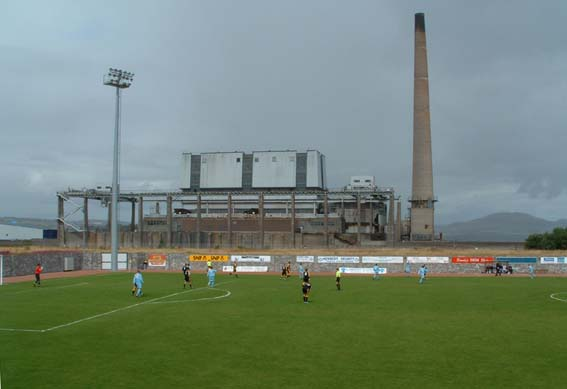
East Fife F.C. play against Berwick Rangers F.C. overlooked by Methil Power Station

The power station consisted of two 30-megawatt (MW) generation units for a peak rating of 57 MWe. It was commissioned in 1965 for the then South of Scotland Electricity Board. Built on the site of a golf course, it was designed to utilise low-grade coal slurry supplied from the washeries of the nearby Fife coalfield. This coal was delivered by road and rail wagons shunted into and out of elevated sidings. Like almost all other coal-fired power stations in Scotland, Methil did not use cooling towers, instead using sea water as coolant. An exception was Methil's sister station of Barony, situated in central Ayrshire.

== History ==
This station was built as a sister to Barony Power Station on the West Coast of Scotland, in Ayrshire. Although the design of Methil was based on that of Barony, it incorporated many improvements. As the Scottish coalfields were exhausted or abandoned in the mid-1980s, waste accumulated in coal tips, and this waste was used as a fuel in the Methil and Barony power stations. However, as the tips were cleared, operations at the two stations ceased due to lack of coal-slurry fuel and the uneconomical operation of such small facilities.

This station ceased generating in 2000 and was put into standby as a strategic reserve. The power station was demolished in 2011 as part of a regeneration of this area.
