= Charlie Fleming (footballer) =

Scottish footballer and manager

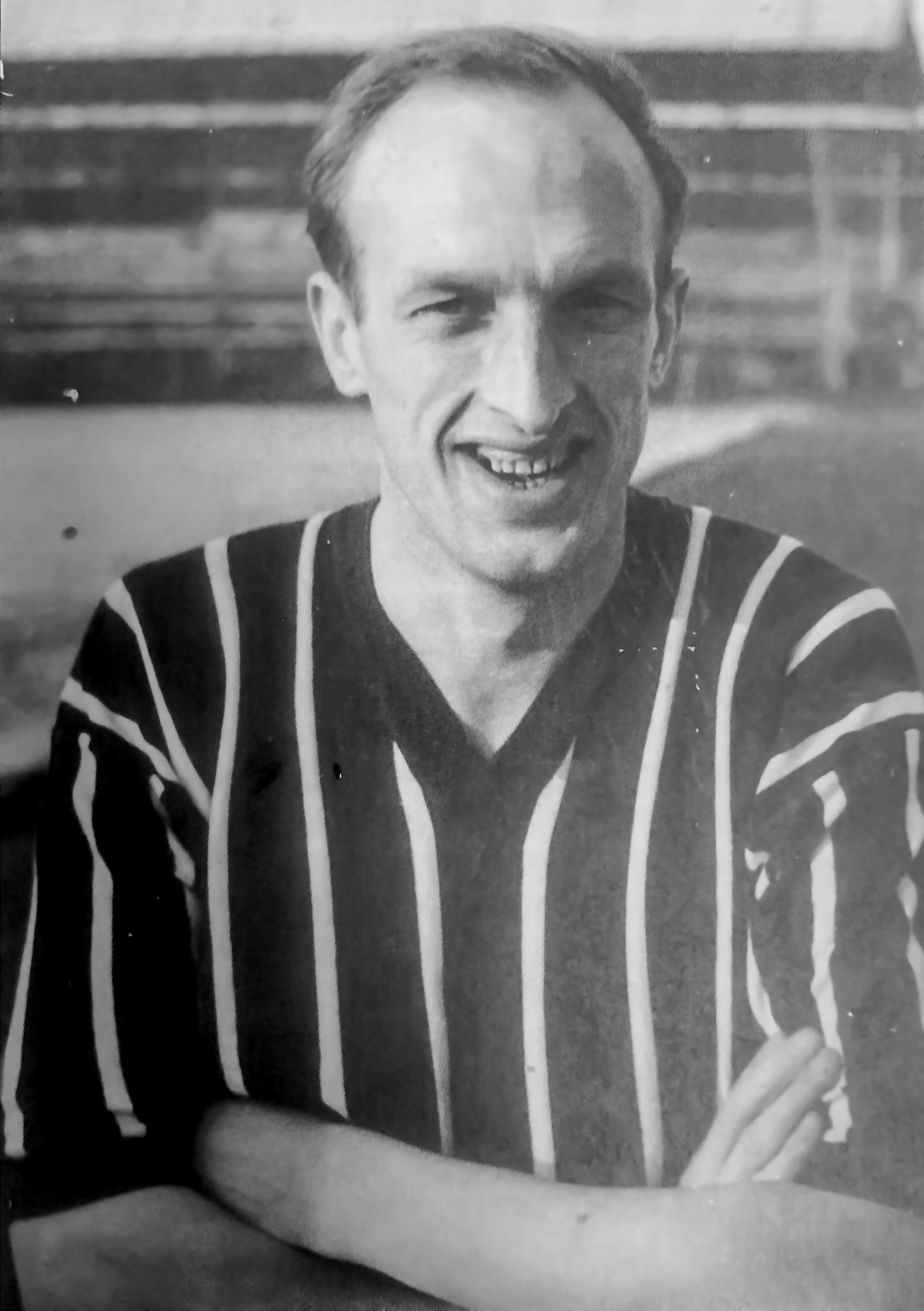

Personal information
- Full name: Charles Fleming
- Date of birth: 12 July 1927
- Place of birth: Blairhall, Fife, Scotland
- Date of death: 14 August 1997 (aged 70)
- Place of death: Edinburgh, Scotland
- Position: Striker

Youth career
- Blairhall Colliery

Senior career*
Years	Team	Apps	(Gls)
1947–1955	East Fife	173	(117)
1955–1958	Sunderland	107	(62)
1958–1965	Bath City	300	(216)
1964	→ Toronto City (loan)		
Total		580	(395)

International career
1953	Scotland	1	(2)
1951	Rest of the UK	1	(1)
- * Club domestic league appearances and goals

Charles Fleming (12 July 1927 – 14 August 1997) was a Scottish footballer who played for Blairhall Colliery, East Fife, Sunderland and the Scotland national team. Fleming was nicknamed 'Cannonball Charlie' for his shooting ability and is Bath City's all-time top goal scorer.

Fleming was born in Blairhall, Fife and joined East Fife from Blairhall Colliery, and became an integral part of East Fife's success in the 1940s and 1950s. Fleming won the League Cup with East Fife in 1949 and 1953 and was part of the side that reached the 1950 Scottish Cup Final.

During his time with East Fife he won his only international cap, scoring twice for Scotland in a 3–1 win against Northern Ireland on 3 October 1953 at Windsor Park. The match counted for both the 1953–54 British Home Championship and 1954 FIFA World Cup qualification.

He moved to English club Sunderland in January 1955 for £20,000 (plus Tommy Wright in exchange) where he remained for three seasons. He moved to Bath City in 1958 and scored 206 goals for Bath until his departure in 1966, making him the club's all-time record goal scorer. At Bath City he signed his ex-East Fife teammate, Bobby Black. In 1964, he played in the Eastern Canada Professional Soccer League with Toronto City.
