= Jim McPhie =

Scottish footballer and manager (1920–2002)

Personal information
- Full name: James McPhie
- Date of birth: 25 August 1920
- Place of birth: Bonnybridge, Scotland
- Date of death: 24 February 2002 (aged 81)
- Place of death: Falkirk, Scotland
- Position: Full-back

Senior career*
Years	Team	Apps	(Gls)
1936–1953	Falkirk	170	(3)

International career
1945	Scotland (wartime)	1	(0)
1948	Scottish League XI	1	(0)

Managerial career
- 1956–1957: Falkirk
- * Club domestic league appearances and goals

James McPhie (25 August 1920 – 24 February 2002) was a Scottish footballer who played for and managed Falkirk. He played as a full-back for Falkirk either side of the Second World War, with guest appearances for Preston North End and Reading. McPhie played in one wartime international for Scotland in November 1945 (the war had ended, but official competitions had yet to resume), and represented the Scottish League once, in 1948. He retired as a player in 1953.

After serving the club as a coach, McPhie managed Falkirk for seven games in early 1957 on a caretaker basis, after Bob Shankly moved to Dundee. He was replaced by Reg Smith.
