= Sammy Stewart (footballer, born 1920) =

Scottish footballer (1920–1995)

Personal information
- Full name: Samuel McKinlay Stewart
- Date of birth: 2 May 1920
- Place of birth: Musselburgh, Scotland
- Date of death: 1995 (aged 75)
- Place of death: Inveresk, Scotland
- Position: Left back

Youth career
- Tranent

Senior career*
Years	Team	Apps	(Gls)
1946–1961	East Fife	392	(2)
- * Club domestic league appearances and goals

Samuel McKinlay Stewart (1 May 1920 – 1995) was a Scottish professional footballer, who played for East Fife in the Scottish Football League. Stewart played for East Fife during a successful period, as the club won the Scottish League Cup three times in the late 1940s and early 1950s.

Stewart scored two goals for the club. One came on his debut against East Stirlingshire on 27 August 1938 at Bayview after 4 minutes. The second was against the same club, again at Bayview, on 6 April 1960. A gap of 21 years and 223 days.
