= Ochilview Park =

Football stadium in Stenhousemuir, Scotland

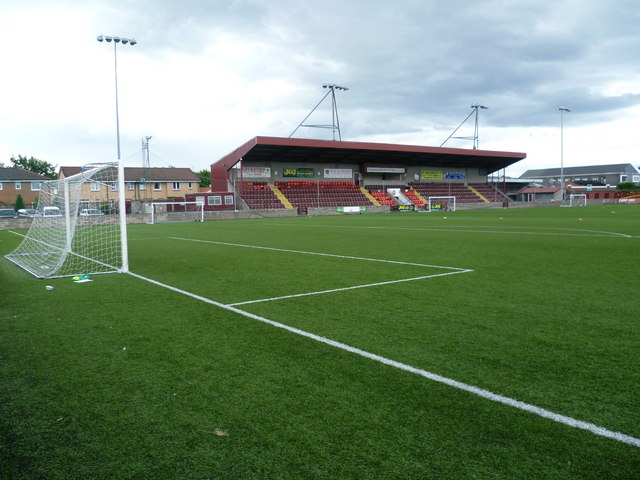
- The Norway Stand

- Location within Falkirk
- Location: Stenhousemuir, Scotland
- Coordinates: 56°01′42″N 3°48′53″W
- Owner: Stenhousemuir F.C.
- Capacity: 3,746 (626 seated)
- Surface: Artificial turf
- Field size: 101m x 66m

Construction
- Opened: 1890
- Renovated: 1990s

Tenants
- Stenhousemuir (1890–present); Stenhousemuir Juniors (1909–10); Stirling Albion (1992–93); Falkirk (2003–04); East Stirlingshire (2008–2018, 2025-present); Syngenta (2021–23); Queen's Park (2022–23)

Ochilview Park is a football stadium in Stenhousemuir in the Falkirk council area of Scotland. It is the home ground of Scottish Championship club Stenhousemuir. The stadium has a capacity of 3,746 with 626 seated.

Ochilview was opened in 1890 and has been the home of Stenhousemuir since then. It has also temporarily hosted home games of other nearby clubs including Stirling Albion, Falkirk and East Stirlingshire. The record attendance of 12,525 was set during a Scottish Cup quarter final match between Stenhousemuir and East Fife on 11 March 1950.

== History ==
Stenhousemuir F.C. was founded in 1884 following the breakaway from a local team called Heather Rangers. The club played at two other grounds, Tryst Park and Goschen Park, before moving to Ochilview in 1890. The name Ochilview derives from the nearby Ochil Hills which are visible from the stadium. In 1928 a new main stand was constructed with bench seating for 310 spectators. It was built to replace the previous stand which was gutted by a fire on 2 April that year. Club folklore has it that during the build it was discovered late into the project that the architect had omitted plans for access to the seating area which had to be quickly rectified; two external staircases were added later.

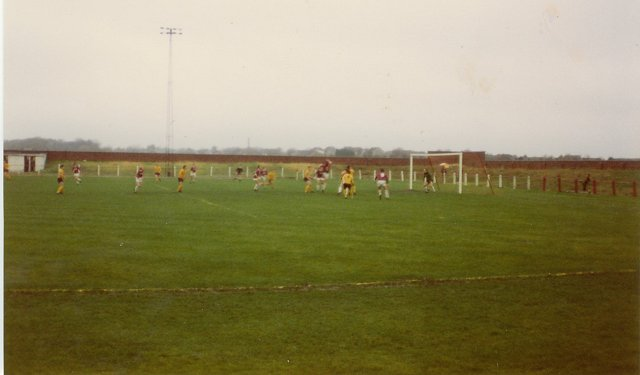
A match against Meadowbank Thistle in 1982

Ochilview Park recorded its largest official attendance on 11 March 1950, when 12,525 spectators attended the club's Scottish Cup quarter-final tie against East Fife. A year later, Ochilview wrote itself into Scottish football history when it was the venue of the first ever floodlit match in Scotland, during a friendly against Hibernian on 7 November 1951.

In 1994, Stenhousemuir were considering relocation, having provisionally agreed to sell Ochilview to the Safeways supermarket chain for £2.5 million. The scheme, however, was frustrated by planning regulations, and instead it was decided to upgrade the existing stadium.

At the end of season 1994–95, the covered terracing on the south side of Ochilview was removed to make way for a new 626 seater main stand. The new stand, which opened in season 1996–97, was subsequently named as the Norway Stand due to a sponsorship deal with Stenhousemuir's Norwegian supporters' club. It is now the only seated accommodation available at the ground, as the old main stand opposite had to be demolished in April 1999 after being refused a safety certificate. The north side of the ground is now largely used for car-parking.

=== Ground-sharing ===
Ochilview Park has played host to several ground-sharing agreements throughout its history from clubs near Stenhousemuir in towns such as Stirling and Falkirk. However, the first to do so was Stenhousemuir Juniors in the late 1900s for one season in 1909–10.

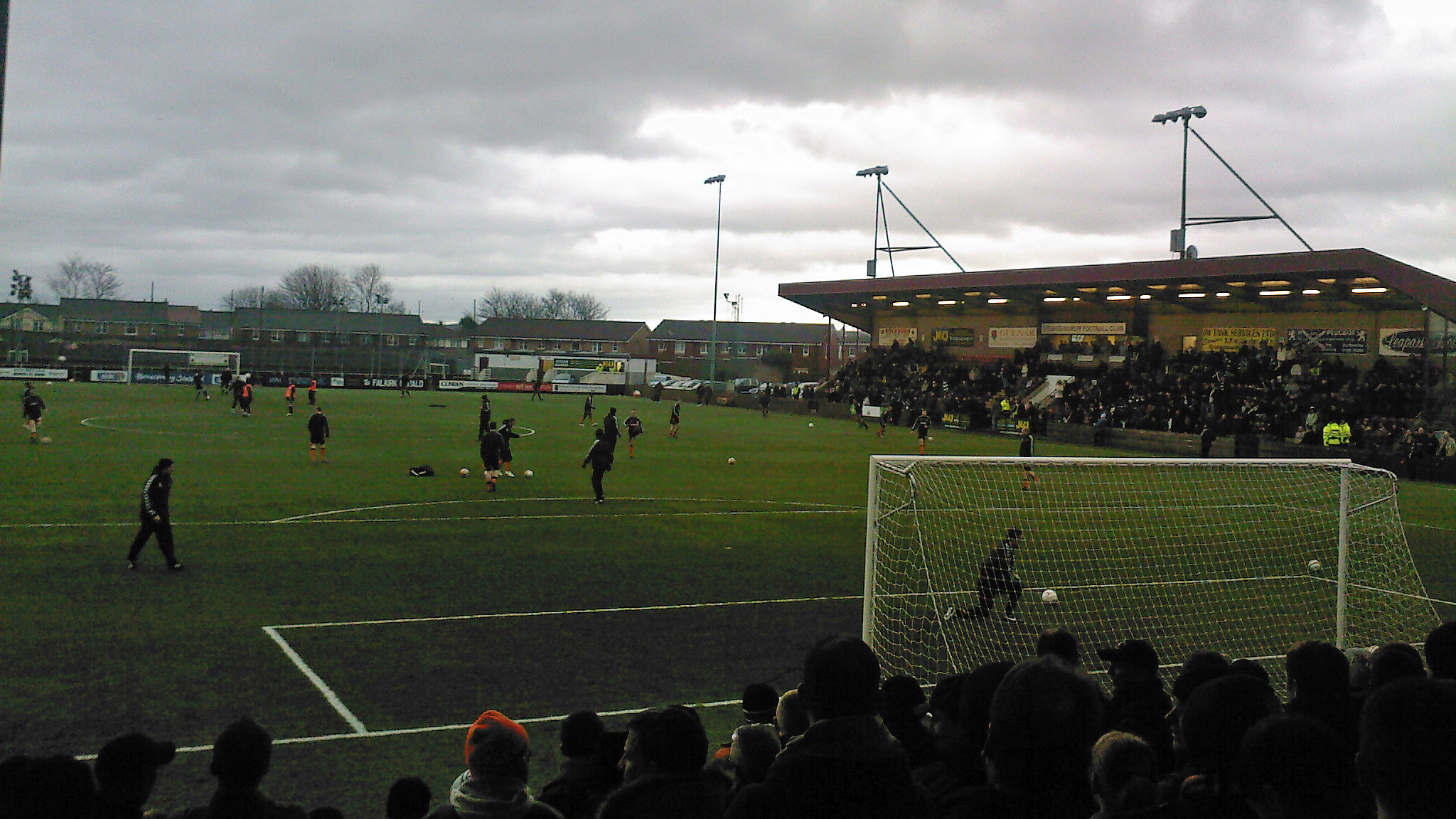
East Stirlingshire's opponents Dundee United warm up before a Scottish Cup fourth round match at Ochilview in 2009

The next club to share the ground was Stirling Albion who played their home games at Ochilview for the 1992–93 season whilst the club's previous home of Annfield Stadium was demolished. The club moved to their new home of Forthbank Stadium in 1993.

Other close rivals and neighbours to have shared the stadium include Falkirk in 2003–04, who did the same as Stirling Albion by sharing the ground for one season, whilst their home of Brockville Park was demolished and replaced by the Falkirk Stadium on the outskirts of the town. Marquee-type stands were erected on the north and east sides of the ground to temporarily raise the ground's capacity to 5,267 during Falkirk's period of tenancy.

The next club to ground share at Ochilview was the other Falkirk club East Stirlingshire, who played at the venue for a number of years commencing from the 2008–09 season, having moved from their ground at Firs Park the previous season. The agreement was initially intended to be for a period of five years, during which the club hoped to develop a new venue in Falkirk. In April 2018 it was announced that East Stirlingshire had agreed to play their home games at the Falkirk Stadium from the start of the 2018–19 season, signalling the end of a decade-long relationship with Ochilview for the club.

East of Scotland League side Syngenta, originally based in Grangemouth, agreed a ground share at Ochilview in 2021. Scottish Championship side Queen's Park would also briefly use the facilities in 2022 for the first few months of the 2022–23 season, while waiting for their new stadium of Lesser Hampden to complete its renovations.

== Structure and facilities ==
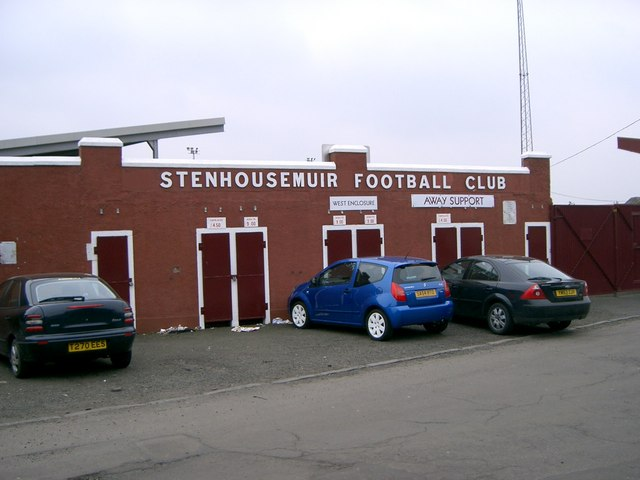
Outside the main stand of Ochilview

Apart from the new main stand, only one side of the ground is usually in use for spectators, this being the terracing at the Tryst Road end (west). In season 2004–05, a new roof was installed here, constructed by club volunteers. The former grass banking at the east end of Ochilview was removed some years ago, and the area has since been flattened and replaced with artificial pitches for community use. The hard standing at this end of the ground has occasionally been used to accommodate standing spectators at higher profile games in recent years. Ochilview Park today has a total capacity of 3,746.

Ochilview boasts a FIFA approved two star synthetic surface.

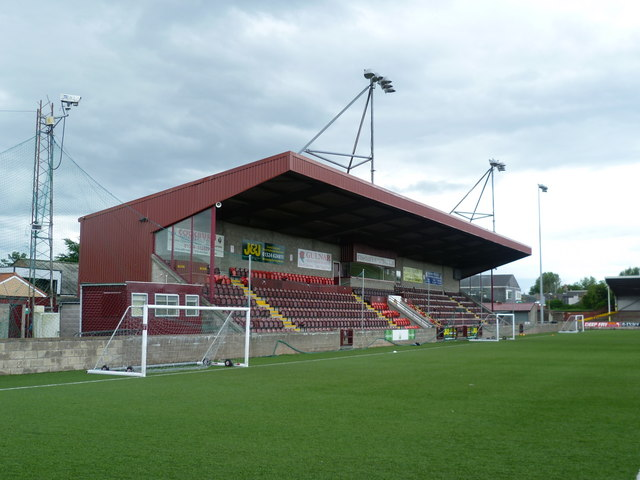
The Norway Stand

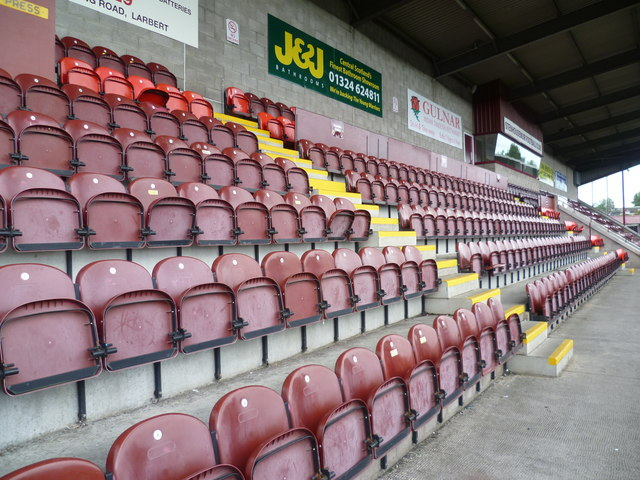
The Norway Stand close-up

== Other uses ==
In 1926–27, greyhound racing was introduced to raise revenue.

== Transport ==
The closest railway station to Ochilview Park is Larbert railway station which is within a 15-minute walk of the stadium being approximately 1.0 km (0.6 miles) distant. The station is located on the main Edinburgh to Dunblane Line and the Croy Line from Glasgow Queen Street, which alternates between Alloa and Dunblane via Stirling.

== See also ==
- Stadium relocations in Scottish football
