= B Division Supplementary Cup =

- Founded: 1944
- Abolished: 1952
- Region: Scotland
- Teams: 14 (1945–47); 16 (1947–52)
- Last champions: Clyde (1st title)
- Most championships: East Fife (2 titles)

The Supplementary Cup was a Scottish football competition open to teams in the B Division, firstly in the Southern League during season 1945–46 and when full peacetime football returned the following season, the Scottish League between seasons 1946–47 and 1951–52. The competition never had a set format apart from a two-legged final when the competition was continued by the Scottish League.

== History ==
The Supplementary Cup was organised by clubs in the B Division of the Southern League to dovetail the end of the league season in February. The competition was launched to accommodate clubs in the B Division who were faced with the prospect of a minimum 32 game campaign of league and cup fixtures. With crowds of over 15,000 attending matches, it prompted the Scottish League to continue the competition when full peacetime football returned the following season.

The second edition of the competition again proved popular with crowds but the third edition proved difficult to run with trying to find suitable dates to play matches. The 1948–49 and 1949–50 editions saw the B Division clubs run the cup, without the league's organisation, which ended up being a shambles. Contributing factors such as finding suitable dates and waning interest from the public saw the tournament abandoned in 1949–50, which meant no return for the cup the following season. The success of the two Saint Mungo Cup tournaments celebrating the Festival of Britain in 1950–51, saw calls for the cup to be revived, which it did, for the 1951–52 season, which proved to be last edition of the competition to date.

The last known whereabouts of the trophy saw it reside in the boardroom at Shawfield by virtue of Clyde being the last winners of the competition, which could mean that the trophy currently resides in the boardroom at Broadwood, the current home of Clyde.

== List of Finals ==
=== Southern League B Division ===
| Season | Winner | Score | Runner-up | Att | Scorers | Venue | Ref |
|---|---|---|---|---|---|---|---|
| 1945–46 | Airdrieonians | 2–1 | Dumbarton | | Peters, Aitken; C Bootland | Ibrox Park, Glasgow | |

=== Scottish League B Division ===
| Season | Home team | Score | Away team | Att | Scorers | Venue | Ref |
|---|---|---|---|---|---|---|---|
| 1946–47 | East Fife | 3–2 | Raith Rovers | 18,000 | Davidson, H Morris, T Adams; Maule, J Stewart | Bayview Park | |
| 1946–47 | Raith Rovers | 1–4 | East Fife | 14,000 | J Stewart; Duncan (2), H Morris, Davidson | Starks Park | |
| 1946–47 | East Fife won 7–3 on aggregate. | | | | | | |
| 1947–48 | Stirling Albion | 1–2 | East Fife | | E Curran; H Morris, T Adams | Annfield | |
| 1947–48 | East Fife | 7–0 | Stirling Albion | | Duncan (3), D Davidson (3), J Davidson | Bayview Park | |
| 1947–48 | East Fife won 9–1 on aggregate. | | | | | | |
| 1948–49 | Raith Rovers | 1–2 | St Johnstone | | Penman; McRoberts, Craig | | |
| 1948–49 | St Johnstone | 2–0 | Raith Rovers | | Munro, McRoberts | | |
| 1948–49 | St Johnstone won 4–1 on aggregate. | | | | | | |
| 1949–50 | Forfar Athletic | - | Kilmarnock | - | - | - | |
| 1949–50 | Kilmarnock | - | Forfar Athletic | - | - | - | |
| 1949–50 | Final not played. Competition abandoned. | | | | | | |
| 1951–52 | Clyde | 5–1 | St Johnstone | 13,000 | J Buchanan (4), T Ring; Goldie | Shawfield Park | |
| 1951–52 | St Johnstone | 2–2 | Clyde | 5,500 | Goldie, P Buckley; B McPhail (2) | Muirton Park | |
| 1951–52 | Clyde won 7–3 on aggregate. | | | | | | |

== See also ==
- Scottish C Division League Cup
- Spring Cup
- Scottish Challenge Cup
