= Archie Aikman =

Scottish footballer

Personal information
- Date of birth: 23 March 1925
- Place of birth: Falkirk, Scotland
- Date of death: 21 February 1998 (aged 72)
- Place of death: Glasgow, Scotland
- Position: Centre forward

Senior career*
Years	Team	Apps	(Gls)
1946–1947	St Mirren	21	(9)
1947–1949	Falkirk	55	(42)
1949–1951	Manchester City	0	(0)
1951–1953	Stenhousemuir	19	(11)
1953–1955	Falkirk	9	(2)
1955–1957	Dundee United	55	(18)
Total		159	(82)

International career
1948	Scottish Football League XI	1	(1)
- * Club domestic league appearances and goals

Archie Aikman (23 March 1925 – 21 February 1998) was a Scottish footballer who played for Rangers, Falkirk, St Mirren, Stenhousemuir and Dundee United. He finished as the top scorer in the Scottish Football League Division One in the 1947–48 season, scoring 20 goals. He signed for Manchester City in 1948, however due to a car crash in pre-season he never played a competitive game for them.

In the late 1950s and early 1960s, Aikman worked with Glasgow-based station Scottish Television as a regular contributor to long-running show Scotsport and also found time to cover irregular shifts as a relief continuity announcer (often out-of-vision, sometimes in-vision) on occasions of holidays, illness or other staff absences in the Theatre Royal.
