= Jimmy Alison =

Scottish footballer (1923–1998)

Personal information
- Full name: James Alison
- Date of birth: 11 October 1923
- Place of birth: Peebles, Scotland
- Date of death: February 1998 (aged 74)
- Place of death: Bournemouth, England
- Position: Wing half

Youth career
- Peebles Rovers

Senior career*
Years	Team	Apps	(Gls)
1946–1949	Falkirk	74	(10)
1949–1951	Manchester City	19	(0)
1952–1957	Aldershot	171	(8)
- Weymouth
Total		264	(18)
- * Club domestic league appearances and goals

James Alison (11 October 1923 – February 1998) was a Scottish footballer, who played as a wing half in the Football League for Manchester City and Aldershot.
