= Stirton Smith =

Scottish footballer (1926–2010)

Personal information
- Date of birth: 28 October 1926
- Place of birth: Gorebridge, Scotland
- Date of death: 2010 (aged 83)
- Place of death: Midlothian, Scotland
- Position: Left winger

Youth career
- Edinburgh Thistle

Senior career*
Years	Team	Apps	(Gls)
1946–48	Heart of Midlothian	1	(0)
1948–49	Third Lanark	1	(0)
1949–50	Dunfermline Athletic	12	(0)
- Arniston Rangers
Total		14	(0)
- * Club domestic league appearances and goals

Stirton Smith (28 October 1926 – 2010) was a Scottish professional footballer.

Smith died in Midlothian in 2010, at the age of 83.
