= John McGarrity =

Scottish footballer (1925–2006)

Personal information
- Date of birth: 20 October 1925
- Place of birth: Fife, Scotland
- Date of death: 2006 (aged 80)
- Place of death: Cowdenbeath, Scotland
- Position: Goalkeeper

Youth career
- Blairhall Colliery

Senior career*
| Years | Team | Apps | (Gls) |
| 1948–1951 | East Fife | 8 | (0) |
| 1951–1952 | Arbroath | | |
| 1952–1954 | Cowdenbeath | 22 | (0) |
| Total | | 30 | (0) |
- * Club domestic league appearances and goals

John McGarrity (20 October 1925 – 2006) was a Scottish footballer who played as a goalkeeper for East Fife, Arbroath and Cowdenbeath.

McGarrity died in Cowdenbeath in 2006, at the age of 80.
