= 1948–49 Scottish Division C =

Scottish Division C
- Season: 1948–49
- Champions: Forfar Athletic
- Promoted: Forfar Athletic

The 1948-49 Scottish Division C was won by Forfar Athletic who were promoted to Division B. Edinburgh City finished bottom. It was the third and final season of the short-lived single Scottish Division C and featured seven reserve teams.

== Table ==
Pos	Team	Pld	W	D	L	GF	GA	GD	Pts	Promotion or relegation
1	Forfar Athletic	22	17	1	4	80	37	+43	35	Promotion to the 1949–50 Division B
2	Leith Athletic	22	15	3	4	76	29	+47	33	Placed in South East Section
3	Brechin City	22	13	4	5	67	40	+27	30	Placed in South East Section
4	Montrose	22	10	5	7	59	50	+9	25	Placed in South East Section
5	Queen's Park II	22	9	6	7	52	52	0	24	Placed in South West Section
6	Airdrieonians II	22	9	4	9	66	66	0	22	Placed in South West Section
7	St. Johnstone II	22	9	4	9	42	44	−2	22	Placed in South East Section
8	Dundee United II	22	10	2	10	58	67	−9	22	Placed in South East Section
9	Raith Rovers II	22	6	7	9	56	60	−4	19	Placed in South East Section
10	Kilmarnock II	22	5	3	14	41	54	−13	13	Placed in South West Section
11	Dunfermline Athletic II	22	4	3	15	43	84	−41	11	Placed in South East Section
12	Edinburgh City	22	2	4	16	28	85	−57	8	Left the League

Source: rsssf

== Future ==
The competition was restructured for the 1949–50 season when the number of reserve teams was significantly expanded and the Division divided into two sections, the South-East (soon renamed the North-East) and South-West. Promotion became rarer as the reserve sides of the bigger clubs such as Rangers and Aberdeen came to dominate; Brechin City's victory in the North-East section in the 1953–54 season was the sole promotion managed in the new format before its final season. The competition completed its final season in 1954–55 when Aberdeen II won the North-East section and Partick Thistle II the South-West; three non-reserve sides, Montrose, East Stirlingshire and Berwick Rangers remained in the North-East section with two, Dumbarton and Stranraer in the South-West. All five were admitted to full membership of the Scottish Football League; the reserve teams were placed into a separate Scottish (Reserve) League.
