= 1949–50 in Scottish football =

77th season of competitive Scottish football

Division A champions
- Rangers

Division B champions
- Morton

Division C (North & East) champions
- Hibernian 'A'

Division C (South & West) champions
- Clyde 'A'

Scottish Cup winners
- Rangers

League Cup winners
- East Fife

Junior Cup winners
- Blantyre Victoria

Scotland national team
- 1950 BHC

The 1949–50 season was the 77th season of competitive football in Scotland and the 53rd season of the Scottish Football League.

== Scottish League Division A ==
Rangers won the league with a 2–2 draw in their last match, away to Third Lanark, a game in which Rangers took a 2–0 lead before Thirds fought back to 2–2. Another goal for Third Lanark would have handed the title to Hibernian.

A few days previously, Rangers had drawn 0–0 with Hibs at Ibrox before a crowd of 101,000, the largest crowd to watch a League match in Britain since the war, a record that still stands. Had Hibs won this match they would have become champions.

Pos	Team	Pld	W	D	L	GF	GA	GD	Pts
1	Rangers	30	22	6	2	58	26	+32	50
2	Hibernian	30	22	5	3	86	34	+52	49
3	Hearts	30	20	3	7	86	40	+46	43
4	East Fife	30	15	7	8	58	43	+15	37
5	Celtic	30	14	7	9	51	50	+1	35
6	Dundee	30	12	7	11	49	46	+3	31
7	Partick Thistle	30	13	3	14	55	45	+10	29
8	Aberdeen	30	11	4	15	48	56	−8	26
9	Raith Rovers	30	9	8	13	45	54	−9	26
10	Motherwell	30	10	5	15	53	58	−5	25
11	St Mirren	30	8	9	13	42	49	−7	25
12	Third Lanark	30	11	3	16	44	62	−18	25
13	Clyde	30	10	4	16	56	73	−17	24
14	Falkirk	30	7	10	13	48	72	−24	24
15	Queen of the South	30	5	6	19	31	63	−32	16
16	Stirling Albion	30	6	3	21	38	77	−39	15

Source: RSSSF

Champions: Rangers
Relegated: Queen Of the South, Stirling Albion

== Scottish League Division B ==
Pos	Team	Pld	W	D	L	GF	GA	GD	Pts	Promotion or relegation
1	Morton	30	20	7	3	77	33	+44	47	Promotion to the 1950–51 Division A
2	Airdrieonians	30	19	6	5	79	40	+39	44	Promotion to the 1950–51 Division A
3	Dunfermline Athletic	30	16	4	10	71	57	+14	36	
4	St Johnstone	30	15	6	9	64	56	+8	36	
5	Cowdenbeath	30	16	3	11	63	56	+7	35	
6	Hamilton Academical	30	14	6	10	57	44	+13	34	
7	Dundee United	30	14	5	11	74	56	+18	33	
8	Kilmarnock	30	14	5	11	50	43	+7	33	
9	Queen's Park	30	12	7	11	63	59	+4	31	
10	Forfar Athletic	30	11	8	11	53	56	−3	30	
11	Albion Rovers	30	10	7	13	49	61	−12	27	
12	Stenhousemuir	30	8	8	14	54	72	−18	24	
13	Ayr United	30	8	6	16	53	80	−27	22	
14	Arbroath	30	5	9	16	47	69	−22	19	
15	Dumbarton	30	6	4	20	39	62	−23	16	
16	Alloa Athletic	30	5	3	22	47	96	−49	13	

Source: "1949-1950 Division B - SPFL Archive". SPFL.

Promoted: Morton, Airdrie

== Scottish League Division C ==
Section	Winner	Runner-up
South-West	Clyde 'A'	Rangers 'A'
South-East	Hibernian 'A'	Hearts 'A'

== Cup honours ==
Competition	Winner	Score	Runner-up
Scottish Cup	Rangers	3 – 0	East Fife
League Cup	East Fife	3 – 0	Dunfermline Athletic
Junior Cup	Blantyre Victoria	3 – 0	Cumnock Juniors

== Other Honours ==
=== National ===
Competition	Winner	Score	Runner-up
Scottish Qualifying Cup - North	Inverness Caledonian	8 – 1 *	Peterhead
Scottish Qualifying Cup - South	Brechin City	12 – 2 *	Duns

=== County ===
Competition	Winner	Score	Runner-up
Aberdeenshire Cup	Peterhead	4 – 3 *	Deveronvale
Ayrshire Cup	Ayr United	3 – 1 *	Kilmarnock
East of Scotland Shield	Hearts	5 – 2	Leith Athletic
Fife Cup	East Fife	4 – 3 *	Cowdenbeath
Forfarshire Cup	Dundee	3 – 2	Brechin City
Glasgow Cup	Rangers	2 – 1 †	Clyde
Lanarkshire Cup	Motherwell	4 – 0	Albion Rovers
Renfrewshire Cup	St Mirren	3 – 2	Morton
Stirlingshire Cup	Falkirk	3 – 0	Alloa Athletic

- * - aggregate over two legs
- † - replay

=== Highland League ===
Top Three
Pos	Team	Pld	W	D	L	GF	GA	GD	Pts
1	Peterhead	30	21	4	5	85	42	+43	46
2	Inverness Caledonian	30	19	2	9	88	45	+43	40
3	Deveronvale	30	18	4	8	90	48	+42	40

== Scotland national team ==
Date	Venue	Opponents	Score	Competition	Scotland scorer(s)
1 October 1949	Windsor Park, Belfast (A)	Northern Ireland	8–2	BHC	Henry Morris (3), Willie Waddell (2), Billy Steel, Lawrie Reilly, Jimmy Mason
9 November 1949	Hampden Park, Glasgow (H)	Wales	2–0	BHC	John McPhail, Alec Linwood
15 April 1950	Hampden Park, Glasgow (H)	England	0–1	BHC	
26 April 1950	Hampden Park, Glasgow (H)	Switzerland	3–1	Friendly	Willie Bauld, Robert Campbell, Allan Brown
21 May 1950	Estádio Nacional, Lisbon (A)	Portugal	2–2	Friendly	Willie Bauld, Allan Brown
27 May 1950	Stade de Colombes, Paris (A)	France	1–0	Friendly	Allan Brown

Key:

- (H) = Home match
- (A) = Away match
- BHC = British Home Championship
