= 1947–48 Scottish League Cup =

Tournament details
- Country: Scotland

Final positions
- Champions: East Fife
- Runners-up: Falkirk

The 1947–48 Scottish League Cup was the second staging of Scotland's second football knockout competition. The competition was won by East Fife, who defeated Falkirk in the Final.

== First round ==
=== Group 1 ===
Team	Pld	W	D	L	GF	GA	GR	Pts
Aberdeen	6	5	0	1	16	3	5.333	10
Motherwell	6	5	0	1	13	3	4.333	10
St Mirren	6	1	0	5	9	18	0.500	2
Queen of the South	6	1	0	5	10	24	0.417	2

Home team	Score	Away team	Date
Motherwell	4–0	Queen of the South	9 August 1947
St Mirren	0–1	Aberdeen	9 August 1947
Aberdeen	2–0	Motherwell	16 August 1947
Queen of the South	8–1	St Mirren	16 August 1947
Motherwell	3–1	St Mirren	23 August 1947
Queen of the South	1–2	Aberdeen	23 August 1947
Aberdeen	2–0	St Mirren	30 August 1947
Queen of the South	0–1	Motherwell	30 August 1947
Motherwell	2–0	Aberdeen	6 September 1947
St Mirren	7–1	Queen of the South	6 September 1947
Aberdeen	9–0	Queen of the South	13 September 1947
St Mirren	0–3	Motherwell	13 September 1947

=== Group 2 ===
Team	Pld	W	D	L	GF	GA	GR	Pts
Falkirk	6	4	1	1	23	11	2.091	9
Partick Thistle	6	3	1	2	20	16	1.250	7
Queen's Park	6	2	0	4	11	18	0.611	4
Morton	6	2	0	4	8	17	0.471	4

Home team	Score	Away team	Date
Falkirk	5–6	Partick Thistle	9 August 1947
Queen's Park	4–1	Morton	9 August 1947
Morton	1–2	Falkirk	16 August 1947
Partick Thistle	3–1	Queen's Park	16 August 1947
Morton	2–1	Partick Thistle	23 August 1947
Queen's Park	0–4	Falkirk	23 August 1947
Morton	3–1	Queen's Park	30 August 1947
Partick Thistle	3–3	Falkirk	30 August 1947
Falkirk	5–0	Morton	6 September 1947
Queen's Park	4–3	Partick Thistle	6 September 1947
Falkirk	4–1	Queen's Park	13 September 1947
Partick Thistle	4–1	Morton	13 September 1947

=== Group 3 ===
Team	Pld	W	D	L	GF	GA	GR	Pts
Rangers	6	4	1	1	12	4	3.000	9
Dundee	6	2	2	2	12	11	1.091	6
Celtic	6	2	1	3	9	11	0.818	5
Third Lanark	6	2	0	4	10	17	0.588	4

Home team	Score	Away team	Date
Dundee	5–0	Third Lanark	9 August 1947
Rangers	2–0	Celtic	9 August 1947
Celtic	1–1	Dundee	16 August 1947
Third Lanark	1–3	Rangers	16 August 1947
Celtic	3–1	Third Lanark	23 August 1947
Rangers	3–0	Dundee	23 August 1947
Celtic	2–0	Rangers	30 August 1947
Third Lanark	5–1	Dundee	30 August 1947
Dundee	4–1	Celtic	6 September 1947
Rangers	3–0	Third Lanark	6 September 1947
Dundee	1–1	Rangers	13 September 1947
Third Lanark	3–2	Celtic	13 September 1947

=== Group 4 ===
Team	Pld	W	D	L	GF	GA	GR	Pts
Heart of Midlothian	6	4	0	2	10	10	1.000	8
Hibernian	6	3	1	2	17	9	1.889	7
Airdrieonians	6	2	1	3	9	14	0.643	5
Clyde	6	2	0	4	14	17	0.824	4

Home team	Score	Away team	Date
Clyde	4–2	Airdrieonians	9 August 1947
Heart of Midlothian	2–1	Hibernian	9 August 1947
Airdrieonians	3–2	Heart of Midlothian	16 August 1947
Hibernian	5–1	Clyde	16 August 1947
Airdrieonians	1–1	Hibernian	23 August 1947
Heart of Midlothian	1–0	Clyde	23 August 1947
Airdrieonians	3–1	Clyde	30 August 1947
Hibernian	1–2	Heart of Midlothian	30 August 1947
Clyde	3–4	Hibernian	6 September 1947
Heart of Midlothian	1–0	Airdrieonians	6 September 1947
Clyde	5–2	Heart of Midlothian	13 September 1947
Hibernian	5–0	Airdrieonians	13 September 1947

=== Group 5 ===
Team	Pld	W	D	L	GF	GA	GR	Pts
Hamilton Academical	6	5	0	1	24	8	3.000	10
Raith Rovers	6	5	0	1	18	11	1.636	10
Dunfermline Athletic	6	1	1	4	6	15	0.400	3
Alloa Athletic	6	0	1	5	5	19	0.263	1

Home team	Score	Away team	Date
Alloa Athletic	1–2	Hamilton Academical	9 August 1947
Dunfermline Athletic	0–2	Raith Rovers	9 August 1947
Hamilton Academical	3–2	Dunfermline Athletic	16 August 1947
Raith Rovers	4–2	Alloa Athletic	16 August 1947
Dunfermline Athletic	1–0	Alloa Athletic	23 August 1947
Raith Rovers	3–1	Hamilton Academical	23 August 1947
Hamilton Academical	9–0	Alloa Athletic	30 August 1947
Raith Rovers	6–1	Dunfermline Athletic	30 August 1947
Alloa Athletic	1–2	Raith Rovers	6 September 1947
Dunfermline Athletic	1–3	Hamilton Academical	6 September 1947
Alloa Athletic	1–1	Dunfermline Athletic	13 September 1947
Hamilton Academical	6–1	Raith Rovers	13 September 1947

=== Group 6 ===
Team	Pld	W	D	L	GF	GA	GR	Pts
Leith Athletic	6	3	3	0	11	7	1.571	9
Albion Rovers	6	3	2	1	14	8	1.750	8
Cowdenbeath	6	2	0	4	7	10	0.700	4
Dundee United	6	1	1	4	5	12	0.417	3

Home team	Score	Away team	Date
Albion Rovers	3–0	Dundee United	9 August 1947
Leith Athletic	2–1	Cowdenbeath	9 August 1947
Cowdenbeath	2–3	Albion Rovers	16 August 1947
Dundee United	2–2	Leith Athletic	16 August 1947
Dundee United	0–2	Cowdenbeath	23 August 1947
Leith Athletic	2–2	Albion Rovers	23 August 1947
Cowdenbeath	0–1	Leith Athletic	30 August 1947
Dundee United	2–1	Albion Rovers	30 August 1947
Albion Rovers	4–1	Cowdenbeath	6 September 1947
Leith Athletic	3–1	Dundee United	6 September 1947
Albion Rovers	1–1	Leith Athletic	13 September 1947
Cowdenbeath	1–0	Dundee United	13 September 1947

=== Group 7 ===
Team	Pld	W	D	L	GF	GA	GR	Pts
Stenhousemuir	6	4	1	1	14	13	1.077	9
St Johnstone	6	4	0	2	16	7	2.286	8
Dumbarton	6	2	1	3	14	17	0.824	5
Arbroath	6	1	0	5	10	17	0.588	2

Home team	Score	Away team	Date
Dumbarton	5–5	Stenhousemuir	9 August 1947
St Johnstone	5–1	Arbroath	9 August 1947
Arbroath	1–3	Dumbarton	16 August 1947
Stenhousemuir	3–2	St Johnstone	16 August 1947
St Johnstone	1–0	Dumbarton	23 August 1947
Stenhousemuir	2–0	Arbroath	23 August 1947
Arbroath	1–2	St Johnstone	30 August 1947
Stenhousemuir	2–1	Dumbarton	30 August 1947
Dumbarton	4–2	Arbroath	6 September 1947
St Johnstone	0–1	Stenhousemuir	6 September 1947
Arbroath	5–1	Stenhousemuir	13 September 1947
Dumbarton	1–6	St Johnstone	13 September 1947

=== Group 8 ===
Team	Pld	W	D	L	GF	GA	GR	Pts
East Fife	6	4	1	1	19	9	2.111	9
Ayr United	6	3	1	2	14	16	0.875	7
Kilmarnock	6	2	2	2	12	12	1.000	6
Stirling Albion	6	1	0	5	14	22	0.636	2

Home team	Score	Away team	Date
Ayr United	2–2	Kilmarnock	9 August 1947
East Fife	3–2	Stirling Albion	9 August 1947
Kilmarnock	0–0	East Fife	16 August 1947
Stirling Albion	1–5	Ayr United	16 August 1947
Ayr United	2–5	East Fife	23 August 1947
Stirling Albion	5–3	Kilmarnock	23 August 1947
Kilmarnock	1–2	Ayr United	30 August 1947
Stirling Albion	2–5	East Fife	30 August 1947
Ayr United	3–2	Stirling Albion	6 September 1947
East Fife	1–3	Kilmarnock	6 September 1947
East Fife	5–0	Ayr United	13 September 1947
Kilmarnock	3–2	Stirling Albion	13 September 1947

== Quarter-finals ==
Home team	Score	Away team	Date
Aberdeen	8–2	Leith Athletic	27 September 1947
Falkirk	3–1	Hamilton Academical	27 September 1947
Heart of Midlothian	3–4	East Fife	27 September 1947
Rangers	2–0	Stenhousemuir	27 September 1947

== Semi-finals ==
Home team	Score	Away team	Date
Aberdeen	0–1	East Fife	11-10-1947
Rangers	0–1	Falkirk	11-10-1947

== Final ==
25 October 1947

Falkirk	0–0	East Fife

Hampden Park
Attendance: 53,785

Replay

1 November 1947

East Fife	4–1	Falkirk
Adams; Duncan		Aikman

Hampden Park
Attendance: 31,000
