= Tommy Adams (footballer) =

Scottish footballer (1916–1984)

Personal information
- Date of birth: 12 February 1916
- Place of birth: Glasgow
- Date of death: 19 October 1984 (aged 68)
- Position: Outside right

Youth career
- Hamiltonhill Social

Senior career*
Years	Team	Apps	(Gls)
- Neilston Victoria
	East Fife	190	(62)
- Hibernian
- Dunfermline Athletic
- Heart of Midlothian F.C.
	Hamilton Academical	10	(1)
- Morton
- Forfar Athletic
- * Club domestic league appearances and goals

Tommy Adams (12 February 1916 – 19 October 1984) was a Scottish footballer best known for his time at East Fife. Despite playing outside the top league for most of his career, Adams was highly regarded, even as one of the best ever uncapped Scottish players.

Adams signed for East Fife in 1935 from Neilston Victoria. He was a member of the 1938 Scottish Cup winning side and also captained the Scottish League Cup-winning side in 1947, scoring in a 4–1 victory over Falkirk, with the Dundee Courier deeming him the best player in the match. He made 10 appearances for Hamilton Academical and scored 1 goal. Adams also played for Greenock Morton, Forfar Athletic and Hibernian.
