= 1949–50 Scottish League Cup =

Tournament details
- Country: Scotland

Final positions
- Champions: East Fife
- Runners-up: Dunfermline Athletic

The 1949–50 Scottish League Cup was the fourth season of Scotland's second football knockout competition. The competition was won by East Fife, who defeated Dunfermline Athletic in the Final.

== First round ==
=== Group 1 ===
Team	Pld	W	D	L	GF	GA	GR	Pts
Rangers	6	3	2	1	15	8	1.875	8
Celtic	6	3	0	3	13	13	1.000	6
Aberdeen	6	2	1	3	12	14	0.857	5
St Mirren	6	2	1	3	7	12	0.583	5

Home team	Score	Away team	Date
Celtic	3–2	Rangers	13 August 1949
St Mirren	3–1	Aberdeen	13 August 1949
Aberdeen	4–5	Celtic	17 August 1949
Rangers	5–1	St Mirren	17 August 1949
Rangers	4–2	Aberdeen	20 August 1949
St Mirren	1–0	Celtic	20 August 1949
Aberdeen	1–0	St Mirren	27 August 1949
Rangers	2–0	Celtic	27 August 1949
St Mirren	1–1	Rangers	30 August 1949
Celtic	1–3	Aberdeen	31 August 1949
Aberdeen	1–1	Rangers	3 September 1949
Celtic	4–1	St Mirren	3 September 1949

=== Group 2 ===
Team	Pld	W	D	L	GF	GA	GR	Pts
Hibernian	6	5	0	1	15	8	1.875	10
Third Lanark	6	3	1	2	12	10	1.200	7
Falkirk	6	2	1	3	4	7	0.571	5
Queen of the South	6	0	2	4	7	13	0.538	2

Home team	Score	Away team	Date
Hibernian	1–0	Falkirk	13 August 1949
Queen of the South	2–4	Third Lanark	13 August 1949
Falkirk	1–0	Queen of the South	17 August 1949
Third Lanark	0–2	Hibernian	17 August 1949
Falkirk	1–2	Third Lanark	20 August 1949
Queen of the South	1–2	Hibernian	20 August 1949
Falkirk	2–1	Hibernian	27 August 1949
Third Lanark	1–1	Queen of the South	27 August 1949
Hibernian	4–2	Third Lanark	31 August 1949
Queen of the South	0–0	Falkirk	31 August 1949
Hibernian	5–3	Queen of the South	3 September 1949
Third Lanark	3–0	Falkirk	3 September 1949

=== Group 3 ===
Team	Pld	W	D	L	GF	GA	GR	Pts
Partick Thistle	6	4	1	1	14	10	1.400	9
Motherwell	6	2	3	1	7	6	1.167	7
Clyde	6	1	3	2	8	9	0.889	5
Dundee	6	1	1	4	8	12	0.667	3

Home team	Score	Away team	Date
Dundee	1–1	Clyde	13 August 1949
Partick Thistle	2–0	Motherwell	13 August 1949
Clyde	1–2	Partick Thistle	17 August 1949
Motherwell	2–0	Dundee	17 August 1949
Clyde	2–2	Motherwell	20 August 1949
Dundee	5–2	Partick Thistle	20 August 1949
Clyde	2–0	Dundee	27 August 1949
Motherwell	1–1	Partick Thistle	27 August 1949
Dundee	0–1	Motherwell	31 August 1949
Partick Thistle	3–1	Clyde	31 August 1949
Motherwell	1–1	Clyde	3 September 1949
Partick Thistle	4–2	Dundee	3 September 1949

=== Group 4 ===
Team	Pld	W	D	L	GF	GA	GR	Pts
East Fife	6	5	1	0	17	7	2.429	11
Heart of Midlothian	6	3	1	2	20	13	1.538	7
Stirling Albion	6	2	0	4	13	22	0.591	4
Raith Rovers	6	1	0	5	11	19	0.579	2

Home team	Score	Away team	Date
Raith Rovers	0–3	East Fife	13 August 1949
Stirling Albion	1–5	Heart of Midlothian	13 August 1949
East Fife	3–1	Stirling Albion	17 August 1949
Heart of Midlothian	5–1	Raith Rovers	17 August 1949
Heart of Midlothian	1–1	East Fife	20 August 1949
Raith Rovers	6–2	Stirling Albion	20 August 1949
East Fife	3–2	Raith Rovers	27 August 1949
Heart of Midlothian	4–5	Stirling Albion	27 August 1949
Raith Rovers	1–2	Heart of Midlothian	31 August 1949
Stirling Albion	0–3	East Fife	31 August 1949
East Fife	4–3	Heart of Midlothian	3 September 1949
Stirling Albion	4–1	Raith Rovers	3 September 1949

=== Group 5 ===
Team	Pld	W	D	L	GF	GA	GR	Pts
Forfar Athletic	6	3	2	1	12	9	1.333	8
Stenhousemuir	6	2	3	1	10	6	1.667	7
Albion Rovers	6	2	3	1	9	8	1.125	7
Hamilton Academical	6	0	2	4	1	9	0.111	2

Home team	Score	Away team	Date
Hamilton Academical	0–1	Forfar Athletic	13 August 1949
Stenhousemuir	0–1	Albion Rovers	13 August 1949
Albion Rovers	1–0	Hamilton Academical	17 August 1949
Forfar Athletic	2–2	Stenhousemuir	17 August 1949
Forfar Athletic	3–2	Albion Rovers	20 August 1949
Hamilton Academical	0–0	Stenhousemuir	20 August 1949
Albion Rovers	2–2	Stenhousemuir	27 August 1949
Forfar Athletic	3–0	Hamilton Academical	27 August 1949
Hamilton Academical	1–1	Albion Rovers	31 August 1949
Stenhousemuir	3–1	Forfar Athletic	31 August 1949
Albion Rovers	2–2	Forfar Athletic	3 September 1949
Stenhousemuir	3–0	Hamilton Academical	3 September 1949

=== Group 6 ===
Team	Pld	W	D	L	GF	GA	GAv	Pts
Airdrieonians	6	4	1	1	16	12	1.33	9
Dundee United	6	4	0	2	22	12	1.83	8
Dumbarton	6	2	1	3	12	16	0.75	5
Arbroath	6	1	0	5	9	19	0.47	2

Home team	Score	Away team	Date
Airdrieonians	5–2	Dundee United	13 August 1949
Dumbarton	5–1	Arbroath	13 August 1949
Arbroath	1–2	Airdrieonians	17 August 1949
Dundee United	5–1	Dumbarton	17 August 1949
Airdrieonians	2–2	Dumbarton	20 August 1949
Arbroath	2–4	Dundee United	20 August 1949
Arbroath	3–1	Dumbarton	27 August 1949
Dundee United	6–0	Airdrieonians	27 August 1949
Airdrieonians	3–1	Arbroath	31 August 1949
Dumbarton	3–1	Dundee United	31 August 1949
Dumbarton	0–4	Airdrieonians	3 September 1949
Dundee United	4–1	Arbroath	3 September 1949

=== Group 7 ===
Team	Pld	W	D	L	GF	GA	GAv	Pts
Cowdenbeath	6	4	1	1	12	4	3.00	9
Morton	6	4	1	1	19	9	2.11	9
Ayr United	6	1	3	2	14	13	1.08	5
Alloa Athletic	6	0	1	5	4	23	0.17	1

Home team	Score	Away team	Date
Ayr United	3–4	Morton	13 August 1949
Cowdenbeath	2–0	Alloa Athletic	13 August 1949
Alloa Athletic	2–2	Ayr United	17 August 1949
Morton	1–0	Cowdenbeath	17 August 1949
Alloa Athletic	0–4	Morton	20 August 1949
Ayr United	2–2	Cowdenbeath	20 August 1949
Alloa Athletic	1–4	Cowdenbeath	27 August 1949
Morton	3–3	Ayr United	27 August 1949
Ayr United	4–0	Alloa Athletic	31 August 1949
Cowdenbeath	2–0	Morton	31 August 1949
Cowdenbeath	2–0	Ayr United	3 September 1949
Morton	7–1	Alloa Athletic	3 September 1949

=== Group 8 ===
Team	Pld	W	D	L	GF	GA	GR	Pts
Dunfermline Athletic	6	5	0	1	17	7	2.429	10
Queens Park	6	3	0	3	8	9	0.889	6
St Johnstone	6	2	0	4	9	13	0.692	4
Kilmarnock	6	2	0	4	10	15	0.667	4

Home team	Score	Away team	Date
Queens Park	0–1	Dunfermline Athletic	13 August 1949
St Johnstone	3–2	Kilmarnock	13 August 1949
Dunfermline Athletic	1–2	St Johnstone	17 August 1949
Kilmarnock	2–0	Queens Park	17 August 1949
Dunfermline Athletic	5–1	Kilmarnock	20 August 1949
Queens Park	2–0	St Johnstone	20 August 1949
Dunfermline Athletic	3–0	Queens Park	27 August 1949
Kilmarnock	2–0	St Johnstone	27 August 1949
Queens Park	3–1	Kilmarnock	31 August 1949
St Johnstone	2–3	Dunfermline Athletic	31 August 1949
Kilmarnock	2–4	Dunfermline Athletic	3 September 1949
St Johnstone	2–3	Queens Park	3 September 1949

== Quarter-finals ==
=== First leg ===
Home team	Score	Away team	Date
Airdrieonians	3–4	Dunfermline Athletic	17 September 1949
Forfar Athletic	1–3	East Fife	17 September 1949
Partick Thistle	4–2	Hibernian	17 September 1949
Rangers	2–3	Cowdenbeath	17 September 1949

=== Second leg ===
Home team	Score	Away team	Date	Agg
Dunfermline Athletic	0–0	Airdrieonians	20 September 1949	4–3
Cowdenbeath	1–3	Rangers	21 September 1949	4–5
East Fife	5–1	Forfar Athletic	21 September 1949	8–2
Hibernian	4–0	Partick Thistle	21 September 1949	6–4

== Semi-finals ==
Home team	Score	Away team	Date
Dunfermline Athletic	2–1	Hibernian	8 October 1949
East Fife	2–1	Rangers	8 October 1949

== Final ==
29 October 1949

East Fife	3–0	Dunfermline Athletic
Duncan; Fleming; Morris

Hampden Park, Glasgow
Attendance: 39,744
