= George Aitken (footballer, born 1925) =

Scottish footballer

Personal information
- Full name: George Graham Aitken
- Date of birth: 28 May 1925
- Place of birth: Lochgelly, Scotland
- Date of death: 22 January 2003 (aged 77)
- Place of death: Sunderland, England
- Position: Wing half

Senior career*
Years	Team	Apps	(Gls)
1946–1950	East Fife	93	(5)
1950–1951	Third Lanark	20	(1)
1951–1958	Sunderland	245	(3)
1958–1960	Gateshead	58	(0)
Total		416	(9)

International career
1949–1954	Scotland	8	(0)
- * Club domestic league appearances and goals

George Graham Aitken (28 May 1925 – 22 January 2003) was a Scottish international footballer, who played for clubs including East Fife and Sunderland. Aitken was part of the East Fife's famous half back line of Philp, Finlay and Aitken.

He became the club's most capped Scotland player of all time, picking up five caps in 1949 and 1950. He always played for winning Scotland sides while with the Fifers. Aitken was among the players to have played for the club in their successful post war era when they enjoyed creditable league and cup success. Aitken won a further three caps after his transfer to Sunderland.

Following his retirement as a player, Aitken spent six years as a coach at Watford.
