= Jimmy Philp =

Scottish footballer

James Morgan Philp (20 November 1913 – March 1998) was a Scottish footballer, who played for St Bernards, Heart of Midlothian, East Fife and Brechin City.

== Career ==
Philp was born in Lumphinnans. His first club was Edinburgh side St Bernards before he joined Hearts.

Philp joined East Fife in 1946/47 and became part of the club's famous halfback line of Philp, Finlay, and Aitken. Philp was among the players to have played for the club in their successful post war era when they enjoyed creditable league and cup success.

Twenty years after signing for St. Bernards, Philp finished his playing career with Brechin City in 1955.

Philp died in Buckhaven in March 1998.
