= 1947–48 in Scottish football =

Division A champions
- Hibernian

Division B champions
- East Fife

Division C champions
- East Stirlingshire

Scottish Cup winners
- Rangers

Scottish League Cup winners
- East Fife

Division C Supplementary League (A) winners
- Forfar Athletic

Division C Supplementary League (B) winners
- East Fife 'A'

Junior Cup winners
- Bo'ness United

Scotland national team
- 1948 BHC

The 1947–48 season was the 75th season of competitive football in Scotland and the 51st season of the Scottish Football League.

== Scottish League Division A ==
Pos	Team	Pld	W	D	L	GF	GA	GD	Pts
1	Hibernian	30	22	4	4	85	26	+59	48
2	Rangers	30	21	4	5	92	20	+72	46
3	Partick Thistle	30	16	4	10	61	42	+19	36
4	Dundee	30	15	3	12	67	51	+16	33
5	St Mirren	30	13	5	12	54	58	−4	31
6	Clyde	30	12	7	11	52	57	−5	31
7	Falkirk	30	10	10	10	55	48	+7	30
8	Motherwell	30	13	3	14	45	47	−2	29
9	Heart of Midlothian	30	10	8	12	37	42	−5	28
10	Aberdeen	30	10	7	13	45	45	0	27
11	Third Lanark	30	10	6	14	56	73	−17	26
12	Celtic	30	10	5	15	41	56	−15	25
13	Queen of the South	30	10	5	15	49	74	−25	25
14	Morton	30	9	6	15	47	43	+4	24
15	Airdrieonians	30	7	7	16	40	78	−38	21
16	Queens Park	30	9	2	19	45	75	−30	20

Source: SPFL

Champions: celtic
Relegated: Airdrie, Queen's Park

== Scottish League Division B ==
Pos	Team	Pld	W	D	L	GF	GA	GD	Pts	Promotion or relegation
1	East Fife	30	25	3	2	103	36	+67	53	Promotion to the 1948–49 Division A
2	Albion Rovers	30	19	4	7	58	49	+9	42	Promotion to the 1948–49 Division A
3	Hamilton Academical	30	17	6	7	75	45	+30	40	
4	Raith Rovers	30	14	6	10	83	66	+17	34	
5	Cowdenbeath	30	12	8	10	56	53	+3	32	
6	Kilmarnock	30	13	4	13	72	62	+10	30	
7	Dunfermline Athletic	30	13	3	14	72	71	+1	29	
8	Stirling Albion	30	11	6	13	65	66	−1	28	
9	St Johnstone	30	11	5	14	69	63	+6	27	
10	Ayr United	30	9	9	12	59	61	−2	27	
11	Alloa Athletic	30	10	6	14	56	77	−21	26	
12	Dumbarton	30	9	7	14	66	79	−13	25	
13	Arbroath	30	10	3	17	55	62	−7	23	
14	Stenhousemuir	30	6	11	13	53	83	−30	23	
15	Dundee United	30	10	2	18	58	88	−30	22	
16	Leith Athletic	30	6	7	17	45	84	−39	19	Relegated to the 1948–49 Division C

Source: "1947-1948 Division B - SPFL Archive". SPFL.

Champions: East Fife, Albion Rovers
Relegated: Leith Athletic

== Scottish League Division C ==
Pos	Team	Pld	W	D	L	GF	GA	GD	Pts	Promotion or relegation
1	East Stirlingshire	22	18	3	1	72	26	+46	39	Promotion to the 1948–49 Division B
2	East Fife 'A'	22	16	3	3	63	37	+26	35	Left the League
3	Forfar Athletic	22	14	4	4	67	37	+30	32	
4	Kilmarnock 'A'	22	10	3	9	52	41	+11	23	
5	St Johnstone 'A'	22	9	4	9	44	51	−7	22	
6	Dundee United 'A'	22	9	2	11	55	57	−2	20	
7	Montrose	22	7	5	10	42	69	−27	19	
8	Arbroath 'A'	22	7	4	11	45	57	−12	18	Left the League
9	Leith Athletic 'A'	22	7	3	12	44	60	−16	17	Left the League
10	Brechin City	22	6	4	12	43	54	−11	16	
11	Edinburgh City	22	6	3	13	51	58	−7	15	
12	Raith Rovers 'A'	22	3	2	17	36	67	−31	8	

Champions: East Stirlingshire

== Cup honours ==
Competition	Winner	Score	Runner-up
Scottish Cup	Rangers	1-1, 1-0 (replay)	Morton
Scottish League Cup	East Fife	0-0, 4-1 (replay)	Falkirk
Junior Cup	Bo'ness United	2-1	Irvine Meadow

== Other honours ==
=== National ===
Competition	Winner	Score	Runner-up
B Division Supplementary Cup	East Fife	9 – 1 *	Stirling Albion
Scottish Qualifying Cup – North	Inverness Caledonian	4 – 3 †	Elgin City
Scottish Qualifying Cup – South	Leith Athletic	3 – 2	Montrose

=== County ===
Competition	Winner	Score	Runner-up
Aberdeenshire Cup	Deveronvale	5 – 3 *	Peterhead
East of Scotland Shield	celtic	3 – 0	Hearts
Fife Cup	Raith Rovers	3 – 2	East Fife
Forfarshire Cup	Dundee United	4 – 1	Arbroath
Glasgow Cup	Rangers	4 – 1	Third Lanark
Renfrewshire Cup	St Mirren	4 – 1	Morton
Southern Counties Cup	Stranraer		
Stirlingshire Cup	Falkirk	1 – 0	Alloa Athletic

- * – aggregate over two legs
- † – replay

=== Highland League ===
Top Three
Pos	Team	Pld	W	D	L	GF	GA	GD	Pts
1	Clachnacuddin	30	21	6	3	99	41	+58	48
2	Peterhead	30	22	3	5	98	43	+55	47
3	Buckie Thistle	30	18	4	8	86	66	+20	40

== Scotland national team ==
Date	Venue	Opponents	Score	Competition	Scotland scorer(s)
4 October 1947	Windsor Park, Belfast (A)	Northern Ireland	0–2	BHC	
12 November 1947	Hampden Park, Glasgow (H)	Wales	1–2	BHC	Andy McLaren
10 April 1948	Hampden Park, Glasgow (H)	England	0–2	BHC	
28 April 1948	Hampden Park, Glasgow (H)	Belgium	2–0	Friendly	Bobby Combe, David Duncan
17 May 1948	Wankdorf Stadium, Bern (A)	Switzerland	1–2	Friendly	Leslie Johnston
23 May 1948	Stade de Colombes, Paris (A)	France	0–3	Friendly	

Key:

- (H) = Home match
- (A) = Away match
- BHC = British Home Championship
