= Henry Morris (footballer) =

Scottish footballer

Personal information
- Full name: Henry Miller Morris
- Date of birth: 17 December 1919
- Place of birth: Dundee, Scotland
- Date of death: 13 March 1993 (aged 73)
- Place of death: Kirkcaldy, Scotland
- Height: 1.78 m (5 ft 10 in)
- Position: Striker

Senior career*
Years	Team	Apps	(Gls)
1939–1946	Dundee Violet		
- Lochee Central
1946–1952	East Fife	121	(100)
1953–1954	Dundee United	0	(0)
1954	Portadown		

International career
1949	Scotland	1	(3)
- * Club domestic league appearances and goals

Henry Miller Morris (17 December 1919 – 13 March 1993) was a Scottish footballer who played for East Fife, Dundee United and the Scotland national team as a centre forward.

Morris, a Dundonian, joined East Fife from Dundee Violet in 1946, having previously played with another junior Dundee side, Lochee Central, during the War. He scored 60 goals during the 1947–48 League campaign as East Fife won the Second Division title. That same season he also helped his side claim the League Cup, the first time it had been won by a side out with the top flight. He won a further League cup with East Fife in 1950 before moving to Dundee United in 1953, where he retired.

Morris scored a hat-trick in his only Scotland cap, an 8–2 win over Ireland in October 1949.

== See also ==
- List of Scotland national football team hat-tricks
