= Davie Duncan =

Scottish footballer

Personal information
- Full name: David Millar Duncan
- Date of birth: 21 November 1921
- Place of birth: Markinch, Fife, Scotland
- Date of death: 11 January 1991 (aged 69)
- Place of death: Kirkcaldy, Fife, Scotland
- Position: Left winger

Youth career
- Lochgelly Albert

Senior career*
Years	Team	Apps	(Gls)
1939–1943	Raith Rovers	0	(0)
1943–1945	Celtic	0	(0)
1946–1954	East Fife	181	(62)
1954–1955	Raith Rovers	36	(13)
1955–1956	Crewe Alexandra	22	(0)
1956–1959	Brechin City	89	(28)

International career
1948	Scotland	3	(1)
1948	Scottish League XI	1	(0)
- * Club domestic league appearances and goals

David Millar Duncan (21 November 1921 – 11 January 1991) was a Scottish international footballer who played in the successful East Fife post war team, when they enjoyed creditable league and cup success.

Duncan was capped three times for Scotland in 1948. The opposition was Belgium, Switzerland and France.
