= East Fife F.C. =

Association football club in Scotland

East Fife
- Full name: East Fife Football Club
- Nicknames: The Fifers; The Methil Milan; The Fife
- Founded: 1903; 123 years ago
- Ground: Bayview Stadium, Methil
- Capacity: 1,980
- Coordinates: 56°11′20″N 2°59′57″W
- Chairman: Liam Anderson
- Manager: Scott Arfield
- League: Scottish League One
- 2025–26: Scottish League One, 8th of 10
- Website: www.eastfifefc.co.uk
Home colours	Away colours

East Fife Football Club is a semi-professional football club established in 1903 in Methil, Fife, Scotland. They are members of the Scottish Professional Football League and compete in Scottish League One, the third tier of the Scottish football league system.

The club were the first to win the Scottish League Cup three times and the first of only two sides from the second tier of the Scottish league system to win the Scottish Cup. This makes them the most successful club in Fife in terms of major honours won.

East Fife are one of four SPFL clubs based in Fife, but are the only one to bear the name of the area. The three others are Dunfermline Athletic, Kelty Hearts and the Kirkcaldy-based Raith Rovers (Cowdenbeath play in the Lowland Football League), all of whom have historically shared rivalries with East Fife.

== History ==
=== Formation and early years ===
Local demand for the establishment of a senior football team led to a public meeting being held in January 1903 and resulted in the formation of East Fife Football Club. After spending its first season competing in the Fife League and the Scottish Qualifying Cup, as well as playing in a number of challenge matches, the club joined the Eastern League for season 1904–05. The following season East Fife joined the Northern League, which included clubs such as Dunfermline Athletic and St Johnstone. The club remained in the Northern League until the 1908–09 season. In 1909, East Fife joined the Central League, which consisted of many of the teams who had played in the Northern League, with the addition of Alloa Athletic, Stenhousemuir and King's Park from Stirling.

=== 1920s and 30s ===
East Fife remained in the Central League until 1921, apart from a period during the First World War when the Eastern League was reformed. In the period following the war, the clubs competing for the Central League were mainly from the coal and shale mining communities of Fife and West Lothian. As the mining towns thrived with the growth of the mining industry and its associated influx of miners and their families, so did the local football clubs. The result of this was that by the end of the decade, the Central League clubs could afford to pay their players higher wages than they would receive in the Scottish Football League. In an effort to stop the migration of its players to the Central League, the Scottish League decided to admit the Central League clubs, including East Fife, to its membership. The Central League therefore became the Scottish Division Two at the start of the 1921–22 season.

Only six years after becoming members of the Scottish League, East Fife appeared in the 1927 Scottish Cup Final, which it lost 3–1 to Celtic at Hampden Park.

East Fife's only season in Scottish football's top division before World War II was 1930–31 after finishing Second Division runners-up the year before.

The 1927 cup feat was surpassed just over a decade later when "The Fifers" won the 1937–38 Scottish Cup. The prestigious trophy was secured with a 4–2 win over Kilmarnock in the replayed final. The game was watched by a crowd of almost 92,000 spectators.

=== Golden age ===
East Fife's best years were undoubtedly in the decade following the Second World War. In 1946–47, the first season after the war, the club finished third, missing promotion by one place. Scot Symon joined as manager in 1947. At the end of 1947–48, East Fife were promoted to the top flight of Scottish football as 'B' Division champions.

During this "Golden Period", the club won the Scottish League Cup on three occasions (1947–48, 1949–50, and 1953–54) in seven seasons. A third Scottish Cup final appearance was added to its achievements list in 1949–50.

The club's league record was also impressive. In the six seasons between 1948 and 1954, East Fife finished its Scottish Division One (then the pinnacle of Scottish football) campaigns in fourth, fourth, tenth, third, third and sixth respectively. In one of these seasons, 1952–53, they were still in the running for the league title with only a few games remaining.

Among the players who were at the club for at least part of this era were Tommy Adams and Willie Laird – both had played in the Scottish Cup-winning side before the war. Others joined and would go on to represent Scotland while at the club – George Aitken, Davie Duncan, Allan Brown, Henry Morris, Charlie Fleming and Andy Matthew. Others such as Jimmy Philp and winger and later Scottish League cap Bobby Black were among those who picked up cup winners' medals at the club. Harold Davis was on the books for a number of seasons but rarely played due to fulfilling his national service in the Korean War in which he was seriously injured in combat. Davis took two years to recover from his injuries, then played a couple of games for the first team before following Symon to Rangers where both had much success.

=== Late 20th century ===
Having spent ten successive seasons in Scotland's top league, East Fife were relegated from Division One at the end of season 1957–58. Since then, the Methil outfit has struggled to match previous success, emphasised by the fact that aside from three seasons during the early 1970s, the club has played all of its football outside the top league since the 1950s.

In November 1998, East Fife moved to a purpose-built stadium near Methil power station.

=== 21st century ===
The 2006–07 season saw East Fife begin the Scottish Third Division campaign impressively, at one point amassing a commanding nine point lead over their nearest rivals. The Fifers' form declined markedly but recovered to qualify for the newly implemented promotion play-offs. East Fife beat Second Division outfit Stranraer 4–2 on aggregate before losing 7–2 to Queen's Park on aggregate in the final. Season 2007–08 commenced with high expectations for The Fifers amidst a flurry of preseason signings. The new acquisitions proved successful as the team thoroughly dominated the early stages, culminating in a twelve-point lead at the top of the division by Christmas. East Fife also revived their historic tradition in the Scottish League Cup by reaching the third round, beating Queen of the South and SPL side St Mirren, before losing out to Old Firm heavyweights Rangers.

The new ground was officially renamed Bayview Stadium in 2007.

East Fife secured the 2007–08 Scottish Third Division title after beating East Stirlingshire at Firs Park, Falkirk 3–0 on 15 March 2008. This gave them a points total of 74, 26 points ahead of Stranraer. This was East Fife's first league title for 60 years and their first piece of silverware since 1954. Having led the team to league success the previous campaign, manager David Baikie resigned from his position on 14 April 2009. Baikie was replaced by Stevie Crawford, who had joined the playing staff the previous summer.

On 23 August 2011, the Fifers delivered an emphatic victory against Dunfermline Athletic of the SPL in the League Cup. Then on 20 September 2011, East Fife recorded yet another cup shock, defeating SPL Aberdeen 7–6 on penalties, after a 3–3 draw, at Pittodrie, to advance to the quarter finals of the Scottish League Cup.

East Fife remained in the Second Division for six seasons before being relegated at the end of the 2013–14 season after defeat in the relegation playoff final, losing 3–2 on aggregate to Stirling Albion. In the preceding season they won the playoff final 1–0 on aggregate with the only goal of the tie coming from David Muir at Peterhead's Balmoor Stadium. They spent two seasons in League Two before winning the league in 2015–16 with 62 points to return to League One, with Gary Naysmith at the managerial helm. Nathan Austin finished the championship-winning season as top scorer, with 22 goals from 25 games.

The Fifers enjoyed a period of relative stability in League One over the coming years, registering several mid-table finishes, including a 5th-place finish in the 2016–17 season, just four points away from a promotion play-off berth. The 2021–22 season saw a downturn in fortunes for the club, leading to their automatic relegation down to League Two for the 2022–23 season.

== Players ==
=== First-team squad ===
As of 8 November 2026

Note: Flags indicate national team as defined under FIFA eligibility rules; some limited exceptions apply. Players may hold more than one non-FIFA nationality.

No.	Pos.	Nation	Player
1	GK	SCO	Derek Gaston
2	DF	SCO	David Wilson
3	DF	SCO	Liam Newton
4	MF	SCO	Kieran Millar
5	DF	SCO	Brian Easton (captain)
6	DF	SCO	Reis Peggie
7	FW	SCO	Myles Gaffney
8	MF	SCO	Patrick Slattery
9	FW	ENG	Nathan Austin
10	FW	SCO	Cameron Ross
11	MF	SCO	Jack Healy
12	MF	ENG	Tobi Joseph
14	FW	ENG	Tyrell Skeen-Hamilton

No.	Pos.	Nation	Player
15	DF	SCO	Tom Milne
16	MF	ALG	Adam Lareef
17	MF	SCO	Calvin Beattie (on loan from Arbroath)
18	FW	SCO	Connor Dow (co-operation loan with Hearts)
19	DF	SCO	Andy Munro
20	DF	GAM	Mamadou Bah
21	GK	SCO	Matty Rollo
22	DF	SCO	Ewan McLeod (on loan from Dunfermline Athletic)
23	MF	SCO	Cammy Ballantyne
24	MF	SCO	Liam Walker (co-operation loan with Hearts)
25	DF	ENG	Hamid Seisay
37	MF	CAN	Scott Arfield

=== Under-20s players to feature in a matchday squad ===
Note: Flags indicate national team as defined under FIFA eligibility rules; some limited exceptions apply. Players may hold more than one non-FIFA nationality.

No.	Pos.	Nation	Player
—	GK	SCO	Liam Bruce
—	DF	SCO	Rhys Berry
—	DF	SCO	Jake Watson
—	MF	SCO	Keir Loughran

No.	Pos.	Nation	Player
—	MF	SCO	Max Wiggin
—	MF	SCO	Murray Preston
—	MF	SCO	Hayden Wilson
—	FW	SCO	Kebba Bah
—	FW	SCO	Max Gallagher

=== On loan ===
Note: Flags indicate national team as defined under FIFA eligibility rules; some limited exceptions apply. Players may hold more than one non-FIFA nationality.

No.	Pos.	Nation	Player
—	GK	ENG	Johnathan Dunford (on loan at Crossgates Primrose)
—	MF	SCO	Jaiden Fairley (on loan at Crossgates Primrose)

== Club staff ==
=== Board of directors ===
Name	Role
(Scotland) Liam Anderson	Chairman
(Scotland) Donald Walker	Vice-chairman
(Scotland) Douglas Briggs	Director / Company secretary
(Scotland) Robert Cargill	Director
(Scotland) Isla Couser	Director (EFSS rep) / Child wellbeing & protection officer
(Scotland) Brian Dickson	Director
(Scotland) Elizabeth Anderson	Associate director
(Scotland) Laura Anderson	Associate director
(Scotland) Tom Brown	Associate director
(Scotland) Leona Guidi	Associate director / Office manager
(Scotland) Stephen Mill	Associate director / Disability access officer / Diversity & inclusion officer
(Scotland) Scott Young	Associate director
(Scotland) Jim Stevenson	Honorary chairman
(Scotland) Harry Blyth	Honorary director
(Scotland) John Donaldson	Honorary director

=== Coaching staff ===
Role	Name
Manager	(Canada) Scott Arfield
Assistant manager	(Scotland) Darren Barr
First team coach	(Scotland) Patrick Slattery
Goalkeeping coach	(Scotland) Jim Moffat
Head physiotherapist	(Scotland) Craig Reynolds
Head of football development	(Scotland) Dave Heddle
Under 20s manager	(Scotland) Conrad Courts
Under 20s coach	(Scotland) Kieran Lindsay
Under 20s coach	(Scotland) Cameron Crosbie
Kitman	(Scotland) Chris Watson
Kitman	(Scotland) Ross Young

== Managers ==
- Thomas Neill (secretary) (1903–1911)
- David McLean (1911–1929)
- Walter Robertson (1929–1931)
- David McLean (1931–1941)
- John McArthur (1941–1947)
- Scot Symon (1947–1953)
- Jerry Dawson (1953–1958)
- Charlie McCaig (1958–1963)
- Jimmy Bonthrone (1963–1969)
- Bill Baxter (1969–1970)
- Pat Quinn (1970–1973)
- Frank Christie (1973–1976)
- Roy Barry (1976–1978)
- Dave Clarke (1978–1987)
- Gavin Murray (1987–1993)
- Alex Totten (1993–1994)
- Steve Archibald (1994–1996)
- Jimmy Bone (1996–1998)
- Steve Kirk (1998–1999)
- Rab Shannon (1999–2001)
- Dave Clarke (2001–2002)
- Jim Moffat (2002–2006)
- David Baikie (2006–2009)
- Stevie Crawford (2009–2010)
- John Robertson (2010–2012)
- Gordon Durie (2012)
- Billy Brown (2012–2013)
- Willie Aitchison (2013)
- Gary Naysmith (2013–2016)
- Barry Smith (2016–2017)
- Darren Young (2017–2021)
- Stevie Crawford (2021–2022)
- Greig McDonald (2022–2024)
- Dick Campbell (2024–2026)
- Scott Arfield (2026–)

== Stadium ==
East Fife's original ground was Bayview Park, in Wellesley Road in the centre of Methil. Since 1998, home matches have been played at the new all-seated Bayview Stadium situated at the old Lower Methil docks, capacity 1,980. The ground has one stand and is open at the three remaining sides. The far side was overshadowed by the derelict Methil power station until its demolition in April 2011 and has a growing business park being built around it as well as a local train station for the Levenmouth rail link which was opened to the public in June 2024.

In 2013–14 East Fife hired in three temporary stands to increase the ground capacity for the two fixtures with Rangers and one fixture with Dunfermline Athletic who visited the ground on 1 February 2014 with only two of the temporary stands open, one for the home support and one for the away support. These boosted the capacity of the Stadium to 4,900. The three temporary stands were removed at the end of the season after the club was relegated.

At the Stadium there is a club shop/cabin for the home supporters, and two bars which are open for both sets of supporters while attending the match.

== Honours ==
- Scottish Cup:
  - Winners (1): 1937–38
  - Runners-up (2): 1926–27, 1949–50
- Scottish League Cup:
  - Winners (3): 1947–48, 1949–50, 1953–54
- Scottish Division Two (second tier):
  - Winners (1): 1947–48
- Scottish Third Division / Scottish League Two (fourth tier):
  - Winners (2): 2007–08, 2015–16
- Scottish B Division Supplementary Cup
  - Winners (2): 1946–47, 1947–48
- Scottish Qualifying Cup:
  - Winners (1): 1921
- Wemyss Cup:
  - Winners (6): 1912, 1913, 1918, 1935, 1936, 1937
- Penman Cup:
  - Winners (4): 1910, 1917, 1939, 1962

== Records ==
- Largest win: 13–2 v Edinburgh City in 1937
- Worst defeat: 0–9 v Heart of Midlothian in 1957
- Record attendance: 22,515 v Raith Rovers in 1950
- Most capped player: Arnold Dwarika 73 caps for Trinidad and Tobago
- Quickest League Title (Scotland): 29 Weeks (25 August 2007 – 15 March 2008)

== See also ==
- East Fife Ladies Football Team
- Levenmouth rail link reopened rail link
