= Scottish League Cup =

Association football tournament in Scotland

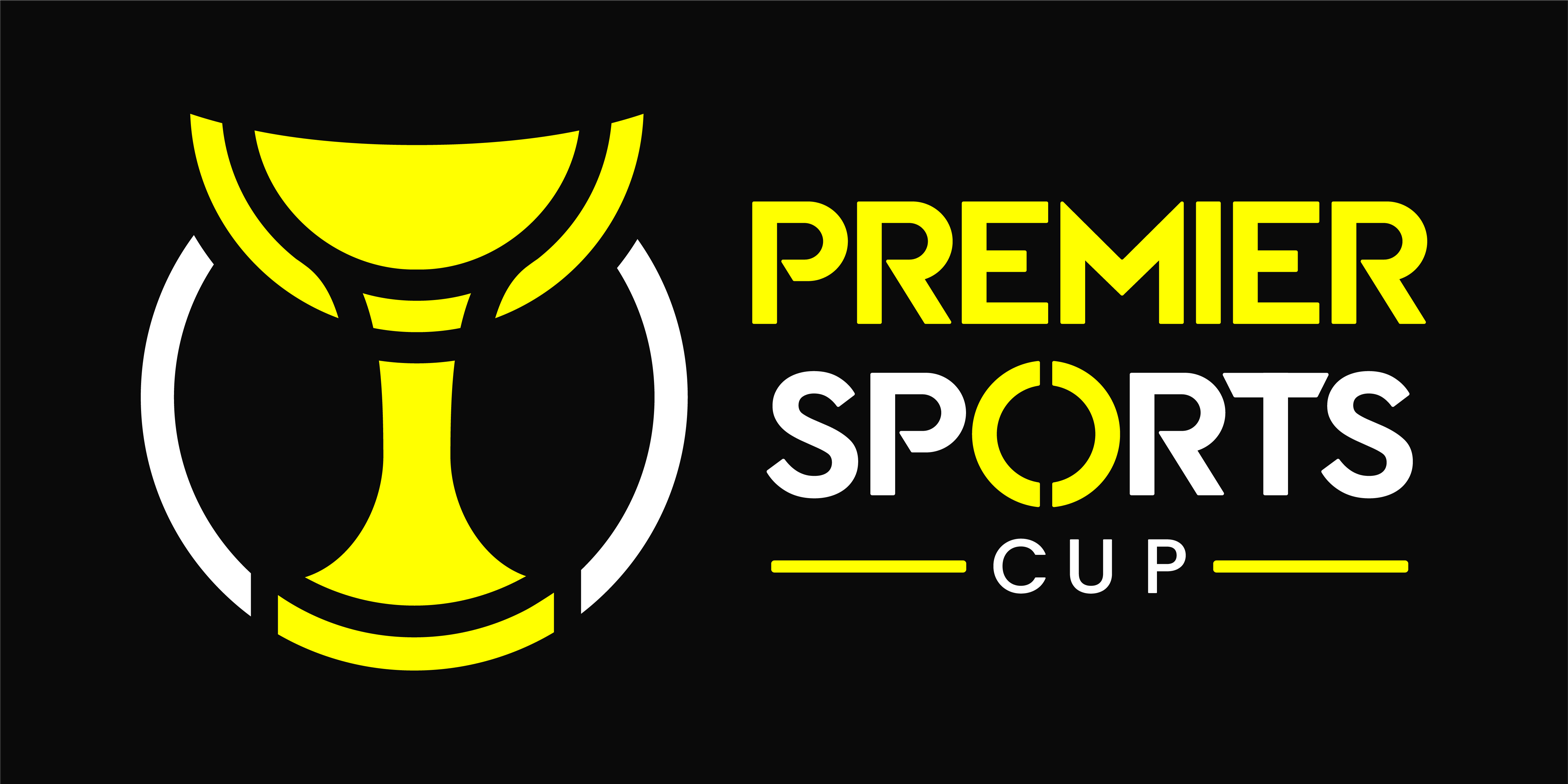
- Founded: 1946
- Region: Scotland
- Teams: 45
- Current champions: St Mirren (2nd title)
- Most championships: Rangers (28 titles)
- Broadcaster: Premier Sports
- 2026–27 Scottish League Cup

The Scottish League Cup is a football competition open to all Scottish Professional Football League (SPFL) clubs. First held in 1946–47, it is the oldest national League cup in existence. The competition had a straight knockout format but became a group and knockout competition from 2016–17.

Rangers are the record holders of the cup, winning 28 times. St Mirren are the current holders, winning their 2nd title after beating Celtic 3–1 at Hampden Park on 14 December 2025.

The domestic television rights are held by Premier Sports, who replaced BT Sport from the 2019–20 season.

== Format ==
Historically, the Scottish League Cup has oscillated between being a straightforward single-elimination knockout tournament and having an initial group phase. Since the 2016–17 season, the League Cup has used a group phase format. The format has eight groups of five teams playing each other once in a round-robin format. The forty teams playing in the group stage consist of the 38 league clubs who are not participating in UEFA competitions, along with two teams from outside the league. (Note: For the 2017–18 season, these two additional teams were East Kilbride and Buckie Thistle, who had won the Lowland League and Highland League respectively in 2016–17.) In the group phase, three points are given for a win and one point for a draw. If matches are level after ninety minutes, a penalty shoot-out is held with the winning team gaining a bonus point. The groups are regionalised: there are four groups in the North section, and four in the South section, with three pots for each regional section – top seeds, second seeds, and unseeded clubs. Each group will consist of one top seed, one second seed, and three unseeded clubs.

The eight group winners and three best runners-up progress into the second round, where they are joined by the five clubs participating in UEFA competitions. The tournament then adopts a single-elimination knockout format. There are no replays, which means all drawn matches are decided by extra time and a penalty shootout, if necessary. The semi-final matches are played on a neutral ground, determined by the location and size of supports involved. The final game is traditionally played at Hampden Park in Glasgow, though due to renovations some finals have been played at other venues, such as Celtic Park or Ibrox Stadium. The new format also allowed the SPFL to reintroduce the two-weekend winter break in January. Along with the newly designed tournament, a new television deal for it was announced as BT Sport took over rights from BBC Scotland. In February 2016 the SPFL announced the League Cup final would be moved to November.

== History ==
The cup has its origins in a regional cup competition called the Southern League Cup which was introduced in 1940 when wartime restrictions led to a suspension of the Scottish Cup. This tournament did not involve all of the teams who comprised the Scottish Football League prior to the outbreak of war, although its last, expanded edition after the conflict ended was well-attended, demonstrating enthusiasm amongst supporters for the continuation of such a tournament. The first official Scottish Football League Cup was contested during the 1946–47 season, when Rangers defeated Aberdeen in the final.

The competition was very popular with supporters during the first few decades of its existence. The tournament consisted of 8 or 9 groups consisting of 4 or 5 teams. The groups were seeded into two sets with the top 16 teams in Division One making up the first four groups, guaranteeing that four 'big' teams would play four 'lesser' teams in the quarter-finals. From 1949–50 to 1998–99 the final was played prior to the festive season which provided the excitement of an early trophy on offer, except in 1968–69 (postponed due to a fire at Hampden), 1977–78, 1978–79 and 1983–84 (an experimental season with a group stage in the third round followed by the semi-finals).

Extra league fixtures after the Scottish Premier Division was formed in 1975 and expanding European competitions meant that by the early 1980s the League Cup's long-winded format, which involved group rounds played early in the season leading to two-legged knock-out rounds, attracted much criticism. From 1984–85 the tournament was revamped to a shorter, single elimination knock-out format. From that period Rangers became the dominant force in the competition having previously been roughly level with Celtic in terms of trophies, winning nine times in twelve years to increase their total to 20 before Celtic won their tenth in 1997–98.

During the 1999–2000 competition, the semi-finals and final were moved to the springtime to avoid the congestion of fixtures caused by the early rounds of the UEFA club competitions and Scotland's representatives in Europe were given automatic byes until the third round of competition. For the 2016–17 season a pre-Christmas schedule was again adopted, although delayed springtime finals were played in 2020–21 (due to disruption caused by the COVID-19 pandemic) and 2022–23 (due to changes to accommodate the 2022 FIFA World Cup, albeit Scotland were not involved in that tournament).

From the 2016–17 edition the League Cup reverted to an early-season group stage format exempting the Scottish representatives in Europe, with single-elimination knock-out in the last 16 onwards. In the first ten seasons since the format change, there were several instances of top-tier clubs failing to progress from the group stage, and only St Johnstone (2020–21) and St Mirren (2025–26) won the trophy having taken part in it.

=== Sponsorship ===
The League Cup has had a variety of title sponsors throughout its history:

Period	Sponsor	Name
1946–1978	No sponsor	Scottish League Cup
1979–1981	Bell's whisky	Bell's League Cup
1981–1984	No sponsor	Scottish League Cup
1984–1992	Skol Lager	Skol Cup
1992–1994	No sponsor	Scottish League Cup
1994–1998	Coca-Cola	Coca-Cola Cup
1998–1999	No sponsor	Scottish League Cup
1999–2008	CIS Insurance	CIS Insurance Cup
2008–2011	The Co-operative Insurance	Co-operative Insurance Cup
2011–2013	Scottish Government	Scottish Communities League Cup
2013–2015	No sponsor	Scottish League Cup
2015	QTS Group	The Scottish League Cup presented by QTS (semi-finals and final only)
2015–2016	Utilita Energy	The Scottish League Cup presented by Utilita
2016–2021	Betfred	Betfred Cup
2021–2022	Premier Sports	Premier Sports Cup
2022–2024	Viaplay	Viaplay Cup
2024–present	Premier Sports	Premier Sports Cup

== Trophy ==
Before the competition's official inception, the Scottish Football League awarded the Southern League Cup winners a trophy that had been borrowed from the Scottish Football Association. In the summer of 1946, the Scottish FA asked for the return of that trophy, which became the Victory Cup.

This left the Scottish Football League without a cup for their new tournament. On 15 January 1947, long-term Clyde, and then Scottish Football League, chairman John McMahon donated the three-handled trophy that is still used to this day.

During the 1980s when Skol lager sponsored the competition, a second trophy known as the Skol Cup was also awarded. After the 1987–88 competition when Rangers won their third Skol Cup, they were given the trophy permanently and a new Skol Cup with a slightly different design was introduced the following season.

== European qualification ==
Until 1995, the winners of the Scottish League Cup were granted a place in the UEFA Cup, although this privilege was rarely invoked as the winning teams usually qualified for Europe by some other means, such as winning the League Championship or Scottish Cup. The final example of this was Raith Rovers who represented Scotland in the 1995–96 UEFA Cup after winning the League Cup the previous season as a First Division club. Since this privilege has been discontinued, some winners have missed out on European football qualification the following season, including 2015–16 winners Ross County who have still never qualified for European football in their history. Additionally Ross County and East Fife are the only League Cup winners to have never played in a UEFA club competition.

== Performance by club ==
Scottish League Cup winners by club
Team	Winners	Runners-up	Years won	Years runners-up
Rangers	28	10	1946–47, 1948–49, 1960–61, 1961–62, 1963–64, 1964–65, 1970–71, 1975–76, 1977–78, 1978–79, 1981–82, 1983–84, 1984–85, 1986–87, 1987–88, 1988–89, 1990–91, 1992–93, 1993–94, 1996–97, 1998–99, 2001–02, 2002–03, 2004–05, 2007–08, 2009–10, 2010–11, 2023–24	1951–52, 1957–58, 1965–66, 1966–67, 1982–83, 1989–90, 2008–09, 2019–20, 2022–23, 2024–25
Celtic	22	16	1956–57, 1957–58, 1965–66, 1966–67, 1967–68, 1968–69, 1969–70, 1974–75, 1982–83, 1997–98, 1999–00, 2000–01, 2005–06, 2008–09, 2014–15, 2016–17, 2017–18, 2018–19, 2019–20, 2021–22, 2022–23, 2024–25	1964–65, 1970–71, 1971–72, 1972–73, 1973–74, 1975–76, 1976–77, 1977–78, 1983–84, 1986–87, 1990–91, 1994–95, 2002–03, 2010–11, 2011–12, 2025–26
Aberdeen	6	10	1955–56, 1976–77, 1985–86, 1989–90, 1995–96, 2013–14	1946–47, 1978–79, 1979–80, 1987–88, 1988–89, 1992–93, 1999–00, 2016–17, 2018–19, 2023–24
Hearts	4	3	1954–55, 1958–59, 1959–60, 1962–63	1961–62, 1996–97, 2012–13
Hibernian	3	8	1972–73, 1991–92, 2006–07	1950–51, 1968–69, 1974–75, 1985–86, 1993–94, 2003–04, 2015–16, 2021–22
Dundee	3	3	1951–52, 1952–53, 1973–74	1967–68, 1980–81, 1995–96
East Fife	3	0	1947–48, 1949–50, 1953–54	—
Dundee United	2	5	1979–80, 1980–81	1981–82, 1984–85, 1997–98, 2007–08, 2014–15
St Mirren	2	2	2012–13, 2025–26	1955–56, 2009–10
Kilmarnock	1	5	2011–12	1952–53, 1960–61, 1962–63, 2000–01, 2006–07
Motherwell	1	3	1950–51	1954–55, 2004–05, 2017–18
Partick Thistle	1	3	1971–72	1953–54, 1956–57, 1958–59
St Johnstone	1	2	2020–21	1969–70, 1998–99
Livingston	1	1	2003–04	2020–21
Raith Rovers	1	1	1994–95	1948–49
Ross County	1	0	2015–16	—
Dunfermline Athletic	0	3	—	1949–50, 1991–92, 2005–06
Falkirk	0	1	—	1947–48
Third Lanark	0	1	—	1959–60
Greenock Morton	0	1	—	1963–64
Ayr United	0	1	—	2001–02
Inverness Caledonian Thistle	0	1	—	2013–14

== Media coverage ==
Scottish League Cup matches are shown live by Premier Sports in the United Kingdom and Ireland. In Australia, the Scottish League Cup is broadcast by beIN Sports. The 2009 Scottish League Cup Final was shown live on SBS due to a fixture clash on previous hosts' Setanta channel. In sub-Saharan Africa, the Scottish League Cup matches are shown live by ESPN

=== List of broadcasters ===
Period	Channel
2002–04	Five
2004–16	BBC One Scotland
2016–20	BT Sport
2020–22	Premier Sports
2022–24	Viaplay
2024–present	Premier Sports
