= 1947–48 Dumbarton F.C. season =

Dumbarton
1947–1948 season
- Manager: William Guthrie
- Stadium: Boghead Park, Dumbarton
- Scottish League B Division: 11th
- Scottish Cup: Third Round
- Scottish League Cup: Prelims
- B Division Supplementary Cup: Second Round
- Top goalscorer: League: John Wardlaw (13); All: Jackie Cantwell (16)
Home colours

The 1947–48 season was the 64th Scottish football season in which Dumbarton competed at national level, entering the Scottish Football League, the Scottish Cup, the Scottish League Cup and the Supplementary Cup. In addition, Dumbarton competed in the Stirlingshire Cup.

== Scottish Football League ==
A poor start, which saw only one point taken from the first 5 league games, meant that any hopes of challenging for promotion were quickly dashed and eventually Dumbarton finished 11th out of 16 with 25 points - 28 behind champions East Fife.

13 August 1947 Division B	Raith Rovers	2–1	Dumbarton	Starks Park
	Dalziel; Young		Cantwell	Attendance: 8,000; Referee: W Brown

27 August 1947 Division B	Dumbarton	2–2	Stenhousemuir	Boghead Park
	Morrison; Donegan		McFarlane 72'	Referee: W Webb

20 September 1947 Division B	Leith Athletic	4–2	Dumbarton	New Meadowbank
	Landells 11'; Broadly 28'; Roberts 53'; Skinner 70'		Shields 17'; Bootland 65'	Attendance: 3,500; Referee: J McDonald

27 September 1947 Division B	Dumbarton	2–4	St Johnstone	Boghead Park
	Goldie 11', 74'		Brown 26', 64'; Goldie 35'; Mayes 72'	Attendance: 2,000; Referee: Jack Mowat

4 October 1947 Division B	Hamilton	6–5	Dumbarton	Douglas Park
	Devlin 5', 77'; Newman 25' (o.g.); Martin 33'; Donaldson 38' (o.g.); McVinish 85'		Wardlaw 35', 52'; Bootland 50'; Goldie 72'; Donegan 86'	Attendance: 5,100; Referee: W Webb

11 October 1947 Division B	Dumbarton	4–2	Dunfermline Athletic	Boghead Park
	Bootland 30', 37'; Wardlaw 62'; Donegan 88'		Kinnell 48'; Whyte 86'	Attendance: 2,000; Referee: J Jackson

18 October 1947 Division B	Dundee United	0–1	Dumbarton	Tannadice Park
			Donegan 48'	Attendance: 7,000; Referee: G Mitchell

25 October 1947 Division B	Dumbarton	3–1	Ayr United	Boghead Park
	Donegan 35'; Wardlaw 81'; Bootland 88'		Wallace 23'	Attendance: 4,000; Referee: M C Dale

1 November 1947 Division B	Alloa Athletic	4–1	Dumbarton	Recreation Park, Alloa
	Gordon 34'; Paris 55', 58', 85'		Bootland 29'	Attendance: 5,000; Referee: J Smellie

8 November 1947 Division B	Dumbarton	1–1	Albion Rovers	Boghead Park
	Wardlaw 88'		Hannah 25'	Referee: W Webb

15 November 1947 Division B	Dumbarton	5–1	Stirling Albion	Boghead Park
	Wardlaw 32', 50', 61'; Goldie 42'; Ashe 78'		Henderson 35'	Attendance: 4,500; Referee: R G Benzie

22 November 1947 Division B	East Fife	6–3	Dumbarton	Bayview Stadium
	Morris 40', 44'; Davidson 43', 67'; McLennan 47', 85'		Bootland 34'; Cantwell 70', 71' (pen.)	Attendance: 5,000; Referee: Jack Mowat

29 November 1947 Division B	Dumbarton	1–1	Cowdenbeath	Boghead Park
	Cantwell 47' (pen.)		Jones 33'	Attendance: 4,000; Referee: J R Smith

6 December 1947 Division B	Kilmarnock	2–2	Dumbarton	Rugby Park
	McAvoy 40'; Collins 72'		Cantwell 75'; Goldie 81'	Attendance: 6,000; Referee: J B Smillie

13 December 1947 Division B	Dumbarton	3–3	Arbroath	Boghead Park
	Cantwell 38' (pen.); Goldie 42'; Wardlaw 72'		Quinn 10', 24', 60'	Attendance: 4,500; Referee: J Kerr

20 December 1947 Division B	Dumbarton	4–2	Raith Rovers	Boghead Park
	Bootland 20', 84'; Wardlaw 27'; Cantwell 61'		Penman 42'; Brady 87'	Attendance: 5,500; Referee: M C Dale

27 December 1947 Division B	Stenhousemuir	4–2	Dumbarton	Ochilview
	Bow 30'; McQueen 66'; McFarlane 80', 81'		Goldie 33', 89'	Attendance: 1,000; Referee: Jack Mowat

3 January 1948 Division B	St Johnstone	4–0	Dumbarton	Muirton Park
	Brown 11'; Goldie 29'; Irving 61'; McMillan 88'			Attendance: 6,500; Referee: A Davidson

10 January 1948 Division B	Dumbarton	0–4	Hamilton	Boghead Park
			Martin 6', 86'; Wright 26'; McVinish 75'	Attendance: 4,000; Referee: W G Livingston

17 January 1948 Division B	Dunfermline Athletic	5–1	Dumbarton	East End Park
	Keith 3'; Ross 22' (o.g.); Kinnell 31', 69', 82'		Cantwell 67'	Attendance: 2,000; Referee: J R Smith

24 January 1948 Division B	Dumbarton	5–1	Leith Athletic	Boghead Park
	Cantwell 44'; McLean 47'; Caldwell 67', 85'; Goldie 89'		Love 79'	Attendance: 2,000; Referee: J S Cox

31 January 1948 Division B	Dumbarton	3–2	Dundee United	Boghead Park
	Wardlaw 6', 69'; McLean 22'		Smart 25'; McKay 25'	Attendance: 2,500; Referee: J Jackson

14 February 1948 Division B	Ayr United	1–1	Dumbarton	Somerset Park
	Beattie 55'		McLennan 79'	Attendance: 5,000; Referee: J S Cox

28 February 1948 Division B	Albion Rovers	5–3	Dumbarton	Cliftonhill
	Wallace 9'; Carrie 17'; Love 38'; McKinnon 28', 68'		McLennan 37', 44', 74'	Attendance: 5,000; Referee: W G Livingstone

6 March 1948 Division B	Stirling Albion	1–1	Dumbarton	Annfield Stadium
	Scott		Ashe	Referee: J Dale

13 March 1948 Division B	Dumbarton	2–4	East Fife	Boghead Park
	Cantwell 72'; Ashe 82'		Davidson 39'; Morris 43', 61'; Duncan 70'	Attendance: 4,000; Referee: W Webb

20 March 1948 Division B	Cowdenbeath	2–1	Dumbarton	Central Park, Cowdenbeath
	Jones 2'; Kesley 32'		Wardlaw 79'	Attendance: 4,000; Referee: P Craigmyle

26 March 1948 Division B	Dumbarton	1–2	Kilmarnock	Boghead Park
	Wardlaw		Henderson 70'; Stevenson 79'	Referee: W Davidson

3 April 1948 Division B	Arbroath	2–3	Dumbarton	Gayfield Park
	Aitken 13'; Collins 20'		Donegan 20', 49'; Cantwell 32'	Attendance: 3,500; Referee: G Mitchell

24 April 1948 Division B	Dumbarton	3–1	Alloa Athletic	Boghead Park
	Grant 62', 88'; Goldie 80'		Gordon 29'	Attendance: 3,000; Referee: F Scott

== League Cup ==
The League Cup saw Dumbarton again struggle to progress from their section, finishing 3rd of 4, with just 2 wins and a draw from their 6 games.

9 August 1947 Section 7	Dumbarton	5–5	Stenhousemuir	Boghead Park
	Ross 20' (pen.); Goldie 23'; Cantwell 34', 84'; Bootland 58'		McFarlane 30'; Napier 52'; Hope 53', 55'; McCormack 88'	Attendance: 4,500; Referee: F Scott

16 August 1947 Section 7	Arbroath	1–3	Dumbarton	Gayfield Park
	Hill 35'		Morrison 8', 57'; Shields 27'	Attendance: 4,000; Referee: J B Smillie

23 August 1947 Section 7	St Johnstone	1–0	Dumbarton	Muirton Park
	Irving 33'			Attendance: 7,500; Referee: J Jackson

30 August 1947 Section 7	Stenhousemuir	2–1	Dumbarton	Ochilview
	Bow 13', 16'		Goldie 38'	Attendance: 2,000; Referee: W Davidson

6 September 1947 Section 7	Dumbarton	4–2	Arbroath	Boghead Park
	Donegan 8'; Cantwell 30', 60' (pen.), 83'		Esplin 57'; Carrie 62'	Attendance: 2,500; Referee: R G Benzie

13 September 1947 Section 7	Dumbarton	1–6	St Johnstone	Boghead Park
	Cantwell 79'		Brown 15', 31', 50'; Goldie 44'; Smeaton 80'; McGowan 84'	Attendance: 4,000; Referee: W G Livingston

== Scottish Cup ==
After negotiating a tricky trip to the Highlands, Dumbarton were defeated by high flying Division B opponents East Fife in the third round.

7 February 1948 Round 2	Peterhead	1–2	Dumbarton	Balmoor Stadium
	Johnstone, B 11'		Goldie 31', 41'	Attendance: 5,473; Referee: A Mowat

21 February 1948 Round 3	Dumbarton	0–1	East Fife	Boghead Park
			Davidson, J 79'	Attendance: 8,000; Referee: J Jackson

== Supplementary Cup ==
As in the Scottish Cup, Dumbarton again came up against East Fife, and the outcome was the same, with the Fifers progressing to the semi-final.

7 January 1948 Round 1	Dumbarton	3–2	Stenhousemuir	Boghead Park
	McCreadie; Goldie; Wardlaw		Hope	Attendance: 3,000; Referee: A Scott

12 April 1948 Round 2	East Fife	2–0	Dumbarton	Bayview Stadium
	Gilmour 12'; Fleming 49'			Attendance: 5,000; Referee: D Alexander

== Stirlingshire Cup ==
Dumbarton lost to Division A Falkirk in the semi-final.

21 August 1947 Round 1	Dumbarton	2–1	East Stirlingshire	Boghead Park
	Donegan 5'; Ross		Cunningham	Attendance: 1,500

19 April 1948 Semi-final	Falkirk	3–2	Dumbarton	Brockville Park
	Inglis 10', 42', 44'		Wardlaw 5'; Goldie 40'	Referee: J R Boyd

== Benefit Match ==
10 September 1947 Benefit	Airdrie	5–3	Dumbarton	Millburn Park
	Watson; Larkins; McCulloch		Cantwell; Docherty; Wagstaffe

== Player statistics ==
No.	Pos	Nat	Player	Total		B Division		Scottish Cup		League Cup		Supplementary Cup	
No.	Pos	Nat	Player	Apps	Goals	Apps	Goals	Apps	Goals	Apps	Goals	Apps	Goals
	GK	(Scotland) SCO	Finlayson	1	0	1	0	0	0	0	0	0	0
	GK	(Scotland) SCO	Jim Hoey	4	0	1	0	0	0	3	0	0	0
	GK	(Scotland) SCO	Archie McFeat	8	0	7	0	1	0	0	0	0	0
	GK	(Scotland) SCO	Stan Gullan	13	0	10	0	0	0	3	0	0	0
	GK	(Scotland) SCO	Ian Ogilvie	14	0	11	0	1	0	0	0	2	0
	DF	(Scotland) SCO	Alex Kay	3	0	2	0	0	0	0	0	1	0
	DF	(Scotland) SCO	Jack McNee	28	0	19	0	2	0	6	0	1	0
	DF	(Scotland) SCO	Jimmy Michie	1	0	1	0	0	0	0	0	0	0
	DF	(Scotland) SCO	Jimmy Mulvaney	38	0	28	0	2	0	6	0	2	0
	MF	(Scotland) SCO	Thomas Ashe	32	3	26	3	2	0	3	0	1	0
	MF	(Scotland) SCO	George Campbell	3	0	1	0	0	0	2	0	0	0
	MF	(Scotland) SCO	Bobby Donaldson	32	0	22	0	2	0	6	0	2	0
	MF	(Scotland) SCO	Ian Hepburn	8	0	7	0	0	0	0	0	1	0
	MF	(Scotland) SCO	John Kelly	2	0	2	0	0	0	0	0	0	0
	MF	(Scotland) SCO	Lawrie Lindsay	3	0	1	0	0	0	2	0	0	0
	MF	(Scotland) SCO	Gordon McFarlane	5	0	2	0	0	0	2	0	1	0
	MF	(Scotland) SCO	Alex Menzies	22	0	21	0	0	0	0	0	1	0
	MF	(Scotland) SCO	Bobby Ross	32	2	26	1	2	0	3	1	1	0
	FW	(Scotland) SCO	Charlie Bootland	30	10	21	9	2	0	6	1	1	0
	FW	(Scotland) SCO	Bobby Caldwell	5	3	5	3	0	0	0	0	0	0
	FW	(Scotland) SCO	Jackie Cantwell	31	16	26	10	0	0	3	6	2	0
	FW	(Scotland) SCO	Hugh Docherty	1	0	0	0	0	0	1	0	0	0
	FW	(Scotland) SCO	Tom Donegan	38	9	28	8	2	0	6	1	2	0
	FW	(Scotland) SCO	Hugh Goldie	39	15	29	10	2	2	6	2	2	1
	FW	(Scotland) SCO	Peter Grant	1	2	1	2	0	0	0	0	0	0
	FW	(Scotland) SCO	Eddie McCreadie	2	1	1	0	0	0	0	0	1	1
	FW	(Scotland) SCO	Neil McLean	7	2	5	2	2	0	0	0	0	0
	FW	(Scotland) SCO	John McLennan	3	4	3	4	0	0	0	0	0	0
	FW	(Scotland) SCO	Dave Morrison	6	3	2	1	0	0	4	2	0	0
	FW	(Scotland) SCO	Jimmy Shields	4	2	2	1	0	0	2	1	0	0
	FW	(Scotland) SCO	Jimmy Smith	3	0	1	0	0	0	2	0	0	0
	FW	(Scotland) SCO	Edwin Wagstaffe	1	0	1	0	0	0	0	0	0	0
	FW	(Scotland) SCO	Johh Wardlaw	20	14	17	13	2	0	0	0	1	1

=== Transfers ===
==== Players in ====
Player	From	Date
(Scotland) Jackie Cantwell	(Scotland) Celtic	9 Jun 1947
(Scotland) Hugh Docherty	(Scotland) Glasgow League Hearts	12 Jun 1947
(Scotland) Jimmy Shields	(Scotland) Celtic	19 Jun 1947
(Scotland) Hugh Goldie	(Scotland) Armadale Thistle	7 Jul 1947
(Scotland) Bobby Ross	(England) Watford	17 Jul 1947
(Scotland) Jack McNee	(Scotland) Carluke Rovers	4 Aug 1947
(Scotland) Jimmy Michie	(Scotland) Dunfermline Athletic (trial)	10 Aug 1947
(Scotland) Eddie McCreadie	(Scotland)	9 Sep 1947
(Scotland) Edwin Wagstaffe	(Scotland)	27 Sep 1947
(Scotland) John Wardlaw	(Scotland) Falkirk (loan)	1 Oct 1947
(Scotland) Alex Menzies	(Scotland) Thornhill United	11 Oct 1947
(Scotland) Ian Hepburn	(Scotland) Queen of the South	6 Dec 1947
(Scotland) Archie McFeat	(Scotland) Morton	3 Jan 1948
(Scotland) Bobby Caldwell	(Scotland) East Stirling	8 Jan 1948
(Scotland) Neil McLean	(Scotland) Neilston	16 Jan 1948
(Scotland) John McLennan	(Scotland) Inverness Thistle	22 Feb 1948
(Scotland) Peter Grant	(Scotland) Rangers (trial)	20 Apr 1948
(Scotland) John Kelly	(Scotland)	

==== Players out ====
Player	To	Date
(Scotland) Jimmy Timmins	(Scotland) Hamilton	18 Aug 1947
(Scotland) Jim Hoey	(Scotland) Stirling Alb	7 Oct 1947
(Scotland) Dave Morrison	(Scotland) Stenhousemuir	14 Oct 1947
(Scotland) Jimmy Smith	(Scotland) retired	21 Oct 1947
(Scotland) John Kelly	(Scotland) freed	23 Oct 1947
(Scotland) George Campbell	(Scotland) Stirling Alb	25 Oct 1947
(Scotland) Stan Gullan	(Scotland) Clyde	20 Nov 1947
(Scotland) Lawrie Lindsay	(Scotland) freed	26 Nov 1947
(Scotland) Hugh Docherty	(Scotland) freed	1 Dec 1947
(Scotland) Jimmy Shields	(Scotland) retired	16 Jan 1948
(Scotland) Edwin Wagstaffe	(Scotland) freed	24 Jan 1948
(Scotland) Thomas Ashe	(Scotland) freed	30 Apr 1948
(Scotland) Bobby Caldwell	(Scotland) freed	30 Apr 1948
(Scotland) Alex Kay	(Scotland) freed	30 Apr 1948
(Scotland) Colin McCalman	(Scotland) freed	30 Apr 1948
(Scotland) Archie McFeat	(Scotland) Morton	30 Apr 1948
(Scotland) John McLennan	(Scotland) freed	30 Apr 1948
(Scotland) Bobby Ross	(Scotland) freed	30 Apr 1948
(Scotland) Jim Douglas	(Scotland) freed	
(Scotland) Bobby Wallace	(Scotland) freed	

== Reserve team ==
Dumbarton entered the Scottish Second XI Cup but lost in the first round to Ayr United.
