= 1946–47 Dumbarton F.C. season =

Dumbarton
1946–1947 season
- Manager: William Guthrie
- Stadium: Boghead Park, Dumbarton
- Scottish League B Division: 13th
- Scottish Cup: Fourth Round
- Scottish League Cup: Prelims
- B Division Supplementary Cup: First Round
- Top goalscorer: League: Robert Stirling (9); All: Robert Stirling (12)
- Highest home attendance: 6,000
- Lowest home attendance: 1,000
- Average home league attendance: 3,030
Home colours

The 1946–47 season was the 63rd official Scottish football season in which Dumbarton competed at national level, and the first where Scottish football got back to normal after the end of WW2. Dumbarton entered the Scottish Football League, the Scottish Cup, the inaugural Scottish League Cup and the Supplementary Cup. In addition Dumbarton competed in the Stirlingshire Cup.

== Scottish Football League ==
Scottish football returned to normal after an absence of seven seasons. Dumbarton played in Division B and finished a disappointing 13th out of 14 with 18 points - 27 behind champions Dundee.

10 August 1946 Division B	Dumbarton	2–3	St Johnstone	Boghead Park
	Sneddon 5', 70'		Robbie 23'; Cook 14', 75'	Attendance: 5,000; Referee: J Jackson

17 August 1946 Division B	Raith Rovers	5–1	Dumbarton	Starks Park
	Muir 32', 54'; Gilmour 58'; Mackie 71'; Stewart 89'		Bootland 82'	Attendance: 8,000; Referee: J Thomson

24 August 1946 Division B	Dumbarton	2–2	Ayr United	Boghead Park
	Sneddon 55'; McMillan 60'		Wallace 15'; Harkness 27'	Attendance: 2,000; Referee: J Mowatt

31 August 1946 Division B	Albion Rovers	3–0	Dumbarton	Cliftonhill
	McCalman 6' (o.g.); Findlay 61'; McClure 64'			Attendance: 7,000; Referee: W Webb

7 September 1946 Division B	Dumbarton	2–1	Dundee	Boghead Park
	Bootland 5'; Young 33'		Juliussen 4'	Attendance: 4,000; Referee: J Thomson

14 September 1946 Division B	Stenhousemuir	0–1	Dumbarton	Ochilview Park
			Bootland 60'	Attendance: 2,000; Referee: J B Smillie

2 November 1946 Division B	Alloa Athletic	0–2	Dumbarton	Recreation Park, Alloa
			Bowman 30' (o.g.); Young	Attendance: 4,000; Referee: A Watt

9 November 1946 Division B	Dumbarton	0–1	Arbroath	Boghead Park
			Gauslin 49'	Attendance: 3,000; Referee: J B Smillie

16 November 1946 Division B	Dundee United	2–1	Dumbarton	Tannadice Park
	Stewart 5' (pen.); Lister 78'		Gilmour 11'	Attendance: 5,000; Referee: J M Martin

23 November 1946 Division B	Dumbarton	2–3	Airdrie	Boghead Park
	Gilmour 4', 23'		Flavell 6', 13'; Cunningham 60'	Attendance: 1,500; Referee: R G Benzie

30 November 1946 Division B	Dumbarton	5–1	Cowdenbeath	Boghead Park
	Ashe 4'; Bootland 21' (pen.); Gilmour 32', 67'; Sneddon 34'		Boyd 80'	Attendance: 2,000; Referee: M C Dale

7 December 1946 Division B	East Fife	1–0	Dumbarton	Bayview Stadium
	Canavan 35'			Attendance: 3,500; Referee: D Gerrard

14 December 1946 Division B	Dumbarton	1–2	Dunfermline Athletic	Boghead Park
	Gillmour 15'		Munro 33'; Noble 52'	Attendance: 1,500; Referee: W Brown

21 December 1946 Division B	St Johnstone	5–2	Dumbarton	Muirton Park
	Brown 2', 47'; Robbie 43', 72'; O'Hagen 81'		Donegan 20', 57'	Attendance: 4,000; Referee: R Duthie

28 December 1946 Division B	Dumbarton	1–1	Raith Rovers	Boghead Park
	Morrison 27'		Gilmour 13'	Attendance: 2,500; Referee: R G Carruthers

1 January 1947 Division B	Ayr United	2–1	Dumbarton	Somerset Park
	Nisbet; Beattie		Morrison

2 January 1947 Division B	Dumbarton	1–1	Albion Rovers	Boghead Park
	Morrison 75'		Stevenson 61'	Attendance: 3,000; Referee: A Campbell

4 January 1947 Division B	Dumbarton	0–2	Dundee United	Boghead Park
			Lister 2'; Grant 47'	Attendance: 1,000; Referee: Jack Mowat

18 January 1947 Division B	Dumbarton	1–0	East Fife	Boghead Park
	Milligan 2'			Attendance: 3,000; Referee: R G Benzie

15 February 1947 Division B	Dumbarton	2–2	Alloa Athletic	Boghead Park
	Stirling 67'; Donegan 75'		Anderson 51'; Wilson 65'	Attendance: 6,000; Referee: F Scott

8 March 1947 Division B	Dumbarton	4–1	Stenhousemuir	Boghead Park
	Donegan 2'; Bootland 23' (pen.); Wallace 78'; Stirling 88'		Newall 25'	Attendance: 5,000; Referee: G Bruce

22 March 1947 Division B	Airdrie	5–4	Dumbarton	Broomfield Park
	Flavell 5', 8', 28', 37', 81'		Stirling 23', 89'; Wallace 39' (pen.), 73' (pen.)	Attendance: 8,000; Referee: J Jackson

5 April 1947 Division B	Dundee	4–0	Dumbarton	Dens Park
	Smith 64'; Rattray 84', 87', 89'			Attendance: 5,873; Referee: R E Carruthers

12 April 1947 Division B	Cowdenbeath	2–1	Dumbarton	Central Park, Cowdenbeath
	Cowan 5'; McCreadie 82'		Milligan 85'	Attendance: 3,000; Referee: R Calder

19 April 1947 Division B	Dunfermline Athletic	3–2	Dumbarton	East End Park
	Kinnell 10', 55', 85'		Stirling 50', 51'	Attendance: 3,000; Referee: J Jackson

26 April 1947 Division B	Arbroath	2–3	Dumbarton	Gayfield Park
	Carrie 12'; Esplin 82'		Stirling 18', 32', 89'	Attendance: 3,500; Referee: J Scott

== Supplementary Cup ==
The Supplementary Cup for B Division teams continued, but Dumbarton fell at the first hurdle to Alloa.

14 August 1946 1st Rnd 1st Leg	Alloa Athletic	4–1	Dumbarton	Recreation Park, Alloa
	Goal		McCulloch	Attendance: 5,000

21 August 1946 1st Rnd 2nd Leg	Dumbarton	2–0 (3–4 agg.)	Alloa Athletic	Boghead Park
	McMillan; Donegan			Referee: W Crawford

== League Cup ==
Following the success of the format of the Southern League Cup played during wartime conditions, the inaugural League Cup was played but Dumbarton failed to progress from their section, finishing 3rd of 4 with just 2 wins from 6 games.

21 September 1946 Section 7	Arbroath	4–1	Dumbarton	Gayfield Park
	Smith 40', 77'; Fraser 57'; Murray 74'		Forshaw 83'	Attendance: 4,000; Referee: D Duthie

28 September 1946 Section 7	Dumbarton	0–3	Dundee United	Boghead Park
			McKinnon 15', 65'; Pacione 39'	Attendance: 3,500; Referee: W M Crawford

5 October 1946 Section 7	Dumbarton	0–4	Cowdenbeath	Boghead Park
			Browning, J 38', 55', 79'; Jones 73'	Attendance: 4,000; Referee: T Shirley

12 October 1946 Section 7	Dumbarton	8–0	Arbroath	Boghead Park
	Donegan 9'; Lindsay 33'; Young 35'; Forshaw 37', 47', 49'; Johnstone 68'; Bootland 87'			Attendance: 2,000; Referee: T A Mowatt

19 October 1946 Section 7	Dundee United	2–1	Dumbarton	Tannadice Park
	Lister 42'; Pacione 79'		Bootland 25'	Attendance: 11,000

26 October 1946 Section 7	Cowdenbeath	2–3	Dumbarton	Central Park, Cowdenbeath
	Browning 22'; Cowan 61'		Bootland 14'; Gilmour 34'; Young 80'	Attendance: 4,500; Referee: W Davidson

== Scottish Cup ==
The return of the Scottish Cup brought much cheer, and after dispatching A Division opponents St Mirren and Third Lanark, Dumbarton lost out narrowly to Hibernian in the fourth round.

25 January 1947 Round 1	St Mirren	2–3	Dumbarton	Love Street (stadium)
	McLaren 75'; Crowe 82'		Donegan 25'; Stirling 32', 76'	Attendance: 10,976; Referee: W Davidson

22 February 1947 Round 3	Dumbarton	2–0	Third Lanark	Boghead Park
	Stirling 8'; Bootland 89'			Attendance: 10,000; Referee: W Webb

15 March 1947 Round 4	Hibernian	2–0	Dumbarton	Easter Road Stadium
	Smith 1'; Cuthbertson 64'			Attendance: 32,579; Referee: J R Boyd

== Stirlingshire Cup ==
East Stirling defeated Dumbarton in the first round after a drawn match.

27 August 1946 1st Rnd	East Stirlingshire	2–2	Dumbarton	Firs Park
	McCormack 25'; Crawford 44'		Sneddon 13'; McCulloch 70'	Attendance: 2,000

30 April 1947 1st Rnd Replay	Dumbarton	1–3	East Stirlingshire	Boghead Park
	Johnstone 55'		Halderstone; Crawford; Inglis 60'

== Friendly ==
One 'friendly' match was arranged against A Division Partick Thistle.

29 March 1947 Friendly	Dumbarton	2–4	Partick Thistle	Boghead Park
	Timmins 10'; Milligan 25'		O'Donnell 7', 50'; Chisholm 58'; Mathie 84'	Referee: P Mooney

== Player statistics ==
No.	Pos	Nat	Player	Total		B Division		Scottish Cup		League Cup		Supplementary Cup	
No.	Pos	Nat	Player	Apps	Goals	Apps	Goals	Apps	Goals	Apps	Goals	Apps	Goals
	GK	(Scotland) SCO	Jim Hoey	34	0	23	0	3	0	6	0	2	0
	GK	(Scotland) SCO	Ian Ogilvie	2	0	2	0	0	0	0	0	0	0
	DF	(Scotland) SCO	John Boyle	3	0	3	0	0	0	0	0	0	0
	DF	(Scotland) SCO	Tommy Coyle	4	0	3	0	0	0	0	0	1	0
	DF	(Scotland) SCO	Colin McCalman	33	0	23	0	3	0	6	0	1	0
	DF	(Scotland) SCO	Robert Wallace	33	3	22	3	3	0	6	0	2	0
	MF	(Scotland) SCO	George Campbell	2	0	2	0	0	0	0	0	0	0
	MF	(Scotland) SCO	Bobby Donaldson	37	0	26	0	3	0	6	0	2	0
	MF	(Scotland) SCO	Jim Douglas	10	0	4	0	0	0	4	0	2	0
	MF	(Scotland) SCO	Lawrie Lindsay	21	1	15	0	1	0	5	1	0	0
	MF	(Scotland) SCO	Jimmy Timmins	18	0	15	0	2	0	0	0	1	0
	FW	(Scotland) SCO	Ron Aitken	2	0	1	0	0	0	0	0	1	0
	FW	(Scotland) SCO	Thomas Ashe	23	1	18	1	3	0	2	0	0	0
	FW	(Scotland) SCO	Charlie Bootland	24	9	16	5	3	1	5	3	0	0
	FW	(Scotland) SCO	Tom Donegan	33	7	25	4	3	1	3	1	2	1
	FW	(Scotland) SCO	Jim Forshaw	8	4	4	0	0	0	4	4	0	0
	FW	(Scotland) SCO	Leon Gallinski	1	0	1	0	0	0	0	0	0	0
	FW	(Scotland) SCO	Rod Gilmour	23	7	16	6	0	0	5	1	2	0
	FW	(Scotland) SCO	George Johnstone	13	1	9	0	0	0	2	1	2	0
	FW	(Scotland) SCO	Donald MacMillan	5	2	4	1	0	0	0	0	1	1
	FW	(Scotland) SCO	John McCulloch	11	1	6	0	4	0	0	0	1	1
	FW	(Scotland) SCO	Willie Miller	3	0	3	0	0	0	0	0	0	0
	FW	(Scotland) SCO	Wallace Milligan	11	2	8	2	3	0	0	0	0	0
	FW	(Scotland) SCO	Dave Morrison	11	3	8	3	3	0	0	0	0	0
	FW	(Scotland) SCO	Andy Sneddon	10	0	6	0	0	0	2	0	2	0
	FW	(Scotland) SCO	Robert Stirling	11	12	8	9	3	3	0	0	0	0
	FW	(Scotland) SCO	Willie Young	16	4	11	2	0	0	5	2	0	0
	FW	(Scotland) SCO	Trialists	5	0	5	0	0	0	0	0	0	0

=== Transfers ===
==== Players in ====
Player	From	Date
(Scotland) Tom Donegan	(Scotland) Celtic	20 May 1946
(Scotland) Andrew Sneddon	(Scotland) Renfrew	20 May 1946
(Scotland) George Johnstone	(Scotland) Clyde	4 Jul 1946
(Scotland) Ron Aitken	(Scotland) Hibernian	25 Jul 1946
(Scotland) John Boyle	(Scotland) Hamilton	6 Aug 1946
(Scotland) Tommy Coyle	(Scotland) Arthurlie	11 Aug 1946
(Scotland) Tommy Ashe	(Scotland) St Mirren	19 Aug 1946
(Scotland) Rod Gilmour	(Scotland) Hearts	20 Aug 1946
(Scotland) Colin McCalman	(Scotland) St Mirren	22 Aug 1946
(Scotland) Lawrie Lindsay	(Scotland) Vale of Leven	26 Aug 1946
(Scotland) Willie Young	(Scotland) St Mirren	6 Sep 1946
(Scotland) Jim Forshaw	(Scotland) Rangers	18 Sep 1946
(Scotland) David Morrison	(Scotland) Third Lanark	27 Dec 1946
(Scotland) Willie Miller	(Scotland)	31 Dec 1946
(Scotland) Wallace Milligan	(Scotland) Airdrie	10 Jan 1947
(Scotland) Robert Stirling	(Scotland) Queen's Park	15 Jan 1947
(Scotland) Leon Galinski	(Scotland)	23 Jann 1947
(Scotland) James Mulvaney	(Scotland) Newarthill Hearts	4 Jun 1947

==== Players out ====
Player	To	Date
(Scotland) John Boyle	(Scotland) released	14 Sep 1946
(Scotland) Donald MacMillan	(Scotland) released	14 Oct 1946
(Scotland) Tommy Coyle	(Scotland) released	10 Jan 1947
(Scotland) Leon Galinski	(Scotland) amateur	26 apr 1947
(Scotland) Ron Aitken	(Scotland) freed	26 Apr 1947
(Scotland) Jim Forshaw	(Scotland) freed	26 Apr 1947
(Scotland) Rod Gilmour	(Scotland) freed	26 Apr 1947
(Scotland) George Johnstone	(Scotland) freed	26 Apr 1947
(Scotland) John McCulloch	(Scotland) freed	26 Apr 1947
(Scotland) Willie Miller	(Scotland) freed	26 Apr 1947
(Scotland) Wallace Milligan	(Scotland) freed	26 Apr 1947
(Scotland) Andy Sneddon	(Scotland) freed	26 Apr 1947
(Scotland) Robert Stirling	(Scotland) freed	26 Apr 1947
(Scotland) Willie Young	(Scotland) freed	26 Apr 1947
(Scotland) Joseph Henderson	(Scotland) Albion Rovers	
(Scotland) Jim McGowan	(England) Grimsby Town	
(Scotland) John Craig	(Scotland) East Fife	

In addition James Brown, John Getty, Thomas Jess, Gordon McFarlane, Victor McAloney, Bernard McDonald, William Neil, Bobby Ross and Robert Torrance would all have played their last 1st team game for Dumbarton before the end of the season.

== Reserve team ==
Dumbarton entered the Scottish Second XI Cup but lost in the first round to Albion Rovers.
