= 1949–50 Dumbarton F.C. season =

Dumbarton
1949–1950 season
- Manager: William Guthrie
- Stadium: Boghead Park, Dumbarton
- Scottish League B Division: 15th
- Scottish Cup: Second Round
- Scottish League Cup: Prelims
- B Division Supplementary Cup: First Round
- Top goalscorer: League: Joe Spiers (7); All: Tom Donegan / Joe Spiers (8)
Home colours

The 1949–50 season was the 66th Scottish football season in which Dumbarton competed at national level, entering the Scottish Football League, the Scottish Cup, the Scottish League Cup and the Supplementary Cup. In addition Dumbarton competed in the Stirlingshire Cup.

== Scottish League ==
If the 1948-49 league campaign was a disappointment, this season was to prove a disaster, with just 16 points being won and a 15th-place finish - a distant 31 behind champions Morton. Things might have been worse, however, with only 4 points separating them from relegation to Division C.

10 September 1949 Division B	Arbroath	1–1	Dumbarton	Gayfield Park
	Lane 34'		Grant 22'	Attendance: 3,500; Referee: M Mann

17 September 1949 Division B	Dumbarton	3–0	Stenhousemuir	Boghead Park
	Goldie 59'; McLean 62'; Donegan 75'			Referee: C Faultless

24 September 1949 Division B	Queen's Park	4–1	Dumbarton	Hampden Park
	Hastie 37', 70', 80'; McAulay 65'		Goldie 75'	Attendance: 8,000; Referee: J Mowatt

1 October 1949 Division B	Dumbarton	1–2	Cowdenbeath	Boghead Park
	Cook 12'		Cameron 18' (pen.); Ellis 40'	Referee: R Main

8 October 1949 Division B	Dundee United	5–0	Dumbarton	Tannadice Park
	McKay 21', 66', 89'; Elliott 61', 69'			Attendance: 12,000; Referee: W Bowman

15 October 1949 Division B	Dumbarton	2–0	Ayr United	Boghead Park
	McLean 17'; Carson 57'			Attendance: 1,000; Referee: A Gebbie

22 October 1949 Division B	Dumbarton	0–1	Ayr United	Boghead Park
			Swan 8'	Attendance: 3,000; Referee: F Scott

29 October 1949 Division B	Alloa Athletic	1–0	Dumbarton	Recreation Park, Alloa
	Foster 81' (pen.)			Attendance: 5,000; Referee: J Kerr

5 November 1949 Division B	Dumbarton	3–4	Morton	Boghead Park
	Speirs 1' 85'; Leitch 88'		Alexander 44'; Boyd 75'; Orr 77'; Meechan 89'	Attendance: 5,700; Referee: W Davidson

12 November 1949 Division B	Albion Rovers	2–1	Dumbarton	Cliftonhill Stadium
	Maxwell 60'; Smith 66'		Cantwell 49'	Attendance: 2,000; Referee: H Anderson

19 November 1949 Division B	Dunfermline Athletic	5–0	Dumbarton	East End Park
	Moyes 6'; McGairy 10'; Henderson 21'; Cannon 40'; Clarkson 83' (pen.)			Attendance: 5,000; Referee: J Cox

26 November 1949 Division B	Dumbarton	0–1	Kilmarnock	Boghead Park
			Donaldson 36'	Attendance: 2,000; Referee: A Gebbie

3 December 1949 Division B	Airdrie	5–2	Dumbarton	Broomfield Park
	Orr 5', 78'; Seawright 23', 85'; Kelly 68' (pen.)		Johnston 14'; Grant 37'	Attendance: 6,000; Referee: C Faultless

10 December 1949 Division B	Forfar Athletic	2–1	Dumbarton	Station Park, Forfar
	Adams 46'; Rodger 60'		Donegan 45'	Attendance: 2,000; Referee: R Smith

17 December 1949 Division B	Dumbarton	0–2	St Johnstone	Boghead Park
			Buckley 9', 42'	Attendance: 1,200; Referee: W Livingstone

24 December 1949 Division B	Dumbarton	4–2	Arbroath	Boghead Park
	Donegan 19', 54'; Spiers 68', 87'		Collins 2'; Ross 78'	Attendance: 2,000; Referee: J Kerr

31 December 1949 Division B	Stenhousemuir	1–2	Dumbarton	Ochilview Park
	Junior 24'		Dunbar 35'; Spiers 85'	Attendance: 2,000; Referee: W Davidson

2 January 1950 Division B	Dumbarton	1–3	Queen's Park	Boghead Park
	Johnston		McCauley; Grierson	Referee: W Graham

3 January 1950 Division B	Cowdenbeath	3–2	Dumbarton	Central Park, Cowdenbeath
	Gilfillan; Armstrong; Dempsey		Johnston; Dunbar	Referee: P Fitzpatrick

7 January 1950 Division B	Dumbarton	3–0	Dundee United	Boghead Park
	McLaren 19'; Spiers 73'; Johnston 84'			Attendance: 3,000; Referee: W Bowman

14 January 1950 Division B	Ayr United	4–2	Dumbarton	Somerset Park
	McIlwain 15'; Aitken 22', 32'; Hodge 42'		Gavin 35' (o.g.); Stirling 60'	Attendance: 6,000; Referee: W Brown

21 January 1950 Division B	Hamilton	1–1	Dumbarton	Douglas Park
	Timmins 35' (pen.)		Grant 1'	Attendance: 3,000; Referee: W Livingstone

4 February 1950 Division B	Dumbarton	4–0	Alloa Athletic	Boghead Park
	Stirling 4', 33'; Peden 38' (pen.); Sheridan 44'			Attendance: 3,000; Referee: C Faultless

18 February 1950 Division B	Dumbarton	0–3	Albion Rovers	Boghead Park
			Dickson 53'; Sinclair 57'; Jack 88'	Attendance: 1,500; Referee: T Shirley

4 March 1950 Division B	Kilmarnock	1–1	Dumbarton	Rugby Park
	Johnston 31'		Johnston 68'	Attendance: 9,000; Referee: C Faultless

11 March 1950 Division B	Dumbarton	0–1	Airdrie	Boghead Park
			Brown, W 86'	Attendance: 5,000; Referee: J Jackson

18 March 1950 Division B	Dumbarton	1–1	Forfar Athletic	Boghead Park
	Johnston 19'		Smith 58' (pen.)	Attendance: 2,000; Referee: J Mowat

25 March 1950 Division B	St Johnstone	2–1	Dumbarton	Muirton Park
	Munro 7' (pen.); Buckley 74'		Spiers 82'	Attendance: 4,000; Referee: W Davidson

1 April 1950 Division B	Morton	1–0	Dumbarton	Cappielow Park
	Mochan 68'			Attendance: 5,000; Referee: J McLean

8 April 1950 Division B	Dumbarton	2–4	Dunfermline Athletic	Boghead Park
	Stirling 14'; Peden 55' (pen.)		McCall 7', 10'; Mayes 60'; Clark 75'	Attendance: 2,000; Referee: G McDonald

== Scottish Cup ==
Dumbarton lost out in the second round of the Cup to Stirling Albion, after two drawn games.

28 January 1950 Round 1	Dumbarton	1–0	Queens Park	Boghead Park
	Stirling 61'			Attendance: 8,500; Referee: R Smith

11 February 1950 Round 2	Stirling Albion	2–2	Dumbarton	Annfield Stadium
	Inglis 4'; Martin 6'		Tait 24'; Johnston 63'	Attendance: 10.072; Referee: J Cox

15 February 1950 Round 2R	Dumbarton	1–1 (a.e.t.)	Stirling Albion	Boghead Park
	Grant		Anderson 70'	Attendance: 9,700; Referee: J Cox

22 February 1950 Round 2R	Dumbarton	2–6	Stirling Albion	Ibrox Park
	Spiers 14'; Dunlop 89'		Millar 2', 33'; Dick 4'; Inglis 32'; Martin 45', 82'	Attendance: 16,000; Referee: J Cox

== Scottish League Cup ==
With two wins and a draw being taken from their 6 games in the sectional games of the League Cup, Dumbarton finished 3rd of 4 and failed to qualify for the next stage.

13 August 1949 Section 6	Dumbarton	5–1	Arbroath	Boghead Park
	Donegan 18', 64'; Leitch 38'; Goldie 49'; Dunbar 75'		Collins 88'	Attendance: 3,000; Referee: J Blair

17 August 1949 Section 6	Dundee United	5–1	Dumbarton	Tannadice Park
	McKay 11', 34'; Cruickshanks 20'; Dunsmore 40'; Colgan		Goldie 57'	Attendance: 10,000; Referee: G McDonald

20 August 1949 Section 6	Airdrie	2–2	Dumbarton	Broomfield Park
	McMillan 54'; Murray 73'		Donegan 63'; Dunbar 81'	Attendance: 8,000; Referee: D Kerracher

27 August 1949 Section 6	Arbroath	3–1	Dumbarton	Gayfield Park
	Ross 6', 30', 42'		Dunbar 47'	Attendance: 4,500; Referee: J Cox

31 August 1949 Section 6	Dumbarton	3–1	Dundee United	Boghead Park
	Goldie 37', 72'; Cantwell 75'		McKay 46'	Attendance: 1,000; Referee: J Smillie

3 September 1949 Section 6	Dumbarton	0–4	Airdrie	Boghead Park
			Brown, W 4'; Orr 13', 28'; Parlane 50'	Attendance: 6,000; Referee: J Kerr

== Supplementary Cup ==
It was a first round exit in the B Division Cup, this time to Stenhousemuir.

29 April 1950 Round 1	Stenhousemuir	2–1	Dumbarton	Ochilview Park
	Allan 23'; Bannan 75' (pen.)		Donegan 74'	Attendance: 500; Referee: S Scott

== Stirlingshire Cup ==
Alloa were to prove too strong for Dumbarton in the first round clash of the county cup.

23 August 1949 Round 1	Alloa Athletic	3–2	Dumbarton	Recreation Park, Alloa
	Goal		Gillies; Neill

== Benefit Matches ==
Two 'benefit' matches were played against strong Rangers and Clyde sides, resulting in wins in both cases.

5 September 1949 Benefit	Dumbarton	7–1	Rangers	Boghead Park
	Goldie; Cantwell; Grant; McLean; Dunbar		Frew

12 September 1949 Benefit	Dumbarton	5–3	Clyde	Boghead Park
	Goldie; Carson; McLean		Buchanan

== Player statistics ==
No.	Pos	Nat	Player	Total		B Division		Scottish Cup		League Cup		Supplementary Cup	
No.	Pos	Nat	Player	Apps	Goals	Apps	Goals	Apps	Goals	Apps	Goals	Apps	Goals
	GK	(Scotland) SCO	Ian Ogilvie	15	0	9	0	0	0	6	0	0	0
	GK	(Scotland) SCO	George Paton	26	0	21	0	4	0	0	0	1	0
	DF	(Scotland) SCO	George Ferguson	39	0	28	0	4	0	6	0	1	0
	DF	(Scotland) SCO	Jack McNee	30	0	20	0	4	0	6	0	0	0
	DF	(Scotland) SCO	John Turnbull	14	0	13	0	0	0	0	0	1	0
	MF	(Scotland) SCO	Bobby Donaldson	19	0	13	0	0	0	6	0	0	0
	MF	(Scotland) SCO	Ian Hepburn	9	0	3	0	0	0	6	0	0	0
	MF	(Scotland) SCO	Jim McGown	3	0	3	0	0	0	0	0	0	0
	MF	(Scotland) SCO	Willie McLaren	25	1	20	1	4	0	0	0	1	0
	MF	(Scotland) SCO	Jim Peden	22	2	17	2	4	0	0	0	1	0
	MF	(Scotland) SCO	John Sharp	22	0	17	0	4	0	0	0	1	0
	MF	(Scotland) SCO	Andy Tait	13	1	10	0	2	1	0	0	1	0
	FW	(Scotland) SCO	Jackie Cantwell	20	2	15	1	0	0	4	1	1	0
	FW	(Scotland) SCO	George Carson	5	1	5	1	0	0	0	0	0	0
	FW	(Scotland) SCO	Ian Cook	6	1	4	1	0	0	2	0	0	0
	FW	(Scotland) SCO	Tom Donegan	35	8	26	4	4	0	4	3	1	1
	FW	(Scotland) SCO	Roy Dunbar	21	5	14	2	0	0	6	3	1	0
	FW	(Scotland) SCO	Rex Dunlop	7	1	6	0	1	1	0	0	0	0
	FW	(Scotland) SCO	Donald Gillies	4	0	0	0	0	0	4	0	0	0
	FW	(Scotland) SCO	Hugh Goldie	9	6	3	2	0	0	6	4	0	0
	FW	(Scotland) SCO	Peter Grant	25	4	20	3	1	1	4	0	0	0
	FW	(Scotland) SCO	Willie Johnston	20	7	16	6	4	1	0	0	0	0
	FW	(Scotland) SCO	Willie Leitch	4	2	1	1	0	0	3	1	0	0
	FW	(Scotland) SCO	Neil McLean	17	2	15	2	0	0	2	0	0	0
	FW	(Scotland) SCO	John Sheridan	3	1	2	1	1	0	0	0	0	0
	FW	(Scotland) SCO	Joe Speirs	22	8	18	7	3	1	1	0	0	0
	FW	(Scotland) SCO	Alex Stirling	16	5	11	4	4	1	0	0	1	0

=== Transfers ===
==== Players in ====
Player	From	Date
(Scotland) Donald Gillies	(Scotland) Aberdeen	3 Aug 1949
(Scotland) Roy Dunbar	(Scotland) East Stirling	6 Aug 1949
(Scotland) Willie Leitch	(Scotland) Motherwell	6 Aug 1949
(Scotland) Ian Cook	(Scotland) Morton	11 Aug 1949
(Scotland) Willie McLaren	(Scotland)	11 Aug 1949
(Scotland) Andrew Neill	(Scotland)	11 Aug 1949
(Scotland) John Sharp	(Scotland)	24 Aug 1949
(Scotland) George Carson	(Scotland) Raith Rovers	15 Sep 1949
(Scotland) John Turnbull	(Scotland) Ayr United	24 Sep 1949
(Scotland) Jim McGown	(Scotland) Stirling Albion	27 Oct 1949
(Scotland) Alex Stirling	(Scotland) Stirling Albion	16 Nov 1949
(Scotland) Jim Peden	(Scotland) Airdrie	1 Dec 1949
(Scotland) Andy Tait	(Scotland) Clydebank Juniors	12 Dec 1949
(Scotland) Willie Johnston	(Scotland) Blantyre Celtic	20 Dec 1949
(Scotland) John Sheridan	(Scotland) Renton BC	25 Jan 1950
(Scotland) Wallace Murdoch	(Scotland) Rhu Amateurs	14 Mar 1950

==== Players out ====
Player	To	Date
(Scotland) Hugh Goldie	(Scotland) Raith Rovers	29 Sep 1949
(Scotland) Ian Hepburn	(Scotland) Partick Thistle	20 Oct 1949
(Scotland) Jim Jamieson	(Scotland) Stirling Albion	24 Dec 1949
(Scotland) George Carson	(Scotland) Freed	29 Dec 1949
(Scotland) Donald Gillies	(Scotland) Freed	19 Mar 1950
(Scotland) Ian Cook	(Scotland) Freed	30 Apr 1950
(Scotland) Roy Dunbar	(Scotland) Freed	30 Apr 1950
(Scotland) Peter Grant	(Scotland) Freed	30 Apr 1950
(Scotland) Willie Leitch	(Scotland) Freed	30 Apr 1950
(Scotland) Gordon McFarlane	(Scotland) Freed	30 Apr 1950
(Scotland) Neil McLean	(Scotland) Freed	30 Apr 1950
(Scotland) Andrew Neill	(Scotland) Freed	30 Apr 1950
(Scotland) Ian Ogilvie	(Scotland) Freed	30 Apr 1950
(Scotland) John Sheridan	(Scotland) Freed	30 Apr 1950
(Scotland) Alex Stirling	(Scotland) Freed	30 Apr 1950

== Reserve team ==
Dumbarton played a reserve team for the first time in many seasons and competed in Division C (South West) finishing 18th and bottom, recording 6 wins and 8 draws from 34 matches. Note that in addition to the reserve sides of the bigger Division A teams in South and West Scotland, the first team of Stranraer also competed in this league.

In the Second XI Cup, Dumbarton were dumped out in the first round by Queen of the South.
