= 1945–46 Dumbarton F.C. season =

Dumbarton
1945–1946 season
- Manager: Jackie Milne
- Stadium: Boghead Park, Dumbarton
- Division B: 8th
- B Division Supplementary Cup: Runner-up
- League Cup South: Prelims
- Top goalscorer: League: Jim McGowan (13); All: Jim McGowan (21)
Home colours

The 1945–46 season was the seventh (and last) Scottish football season in which Dumbarton competed in specially arranged wartime football.

== Scottish Football League ==
In what was the last Scottish football season to be played under wartime conditions, the League competition was split into two divisions, with Dumbarton playing in Division B. Dumbarton finished 8th out of 16 with 26 points - 18 behind champions Dundee. No promotion or relegation resulted from the competition.

11 August 1945 Division B	St Johnstone	3–3	Dumbarton	Muirton Park
	Souttar 10'; McIntosh 15', 75'		McGowan 6'; McMillan 44'; Timmins 60'	Attendance: 4,000; Referee: J M Martin

18 August 1945 Division B	Dumbarton	4–0	Albion Rovers	Boghead Park
	McMillan 43'; Murphy 47'; McGowan 66', 67'			Attendance: 3,000; Referee: J Brownlie

25 August 1945 Division B	Dundee	5–2	Dumbarton	Dens Park
	Ochterlonie 8'; Moir 11'; Bowman 18'; Anderson 47', 63'		Timmins 21' (pen.); McGowan 27'	Attendance: 8,500; Referee: D Gerrard

1 September 1945 Division B	Dumbarton	6–3	Raith Rovers	Boghead Park
	Marshall 4', 87'; McGowan 36', 63'; Mcdonald 71', 78'		Wood 35'; Stewart 40', 75'	Attendance: 3,000; Referee: E Shirley

8 September 1945 Division B	Ayr United	4–1	Dumbarton	Somerset Park
	Harper 39'; Malcolm 67'; Leitch 73'; Smith 84' (pen.)		Mcdonald 33'	Attendance: 5,000; Referee: J Nichol

15 September 1945 Division B	Dumbarton	1–1	Stenhousemuir	Boghead Park
	Mcdonald 87'		Ormand 59'	Attendance: 2,000; Referee: W M Crawford

22 September 1945 Division B	Dumbarton	2–0	Arbroath	Boghead Park
	McAloney 11'; McGowan 14'			Attendance: 1,500; Referee: F Scott

29 September 1945 Division B	Alloa Athletic	2–1	Dumbarton	Recreation Park, Alloa
	Stephenson 37'; McKay 48'		McGowan 32'	Attendance: 5,000; Referee: J Brownlie

6 October 1945 Division B	Dumbarton	2–1	Dunfermline Athletic	Boghead Park
	McGowan 75'; McNamara 80'		Ellis 14'	Attendance: 2,500; Referee: J Pollock

13 October 1945 Division B	Dumbarton	3–0	East Fife	Boghead Park
	McDonald 13'; Bootland 60'; Jess 73'			Attendance: 3,000; Referee: R Maxwell

20 October 1945 Division B	Cowdenbeath	1–5	Dumbarton	Central Park, Cowdenbeath
	Ferguson 55'		McNamara 1'; McDonald 30'; Bootland 33'; McMillan 34'	Attendance: 4,000; Referee: G Mitchell

27 October 1945 Division B	Dumbarton	1–2	Airdrie	Boghead Park
	McNamara 8'		Alexander 1', 59'	Attendance: 4,000; Referee: W G Livingstone

3 November 1945 Division B	Dumbarton	2–1	Dundee United	Boghead Park
	Campbell; McGowan		Newman

10 November 1945 Division B	Albion Rovers	3–0	Dumbarton	Cliftonhill
	Findlay 35', 86'; Loudon 46'			Attendance: 2,000; Referee: W Bowman

17 November 1945 Division B	Dumbarton	3–5	St Johnstone	Boghead Park
	Bootland 5'; Marshall 36', 50'		McIntosh 8', 22'; Burns 12'; Boyd 24'; Soutar 85'	Attendance: 2,000; Referee: J Jackson

24 November 1945 Division B	Dumbarton	0–1	Dundee	Boghead Park
			Gallacher 15'	Attendance: 5,000; Referee: J Cameron

1 December 1945 Division B	Raith Rovers	1–4	Dumbarton	Starks Park
	Woon 79'		McMillan 43', 61', 70'; Timmins 75'	Attendance: 3,000; Referee: W T Livingston

8 December 1945 Division B	Arbroath	0–3	Dumbarton	Gayfield Park
			Neil 6', 9'; McGowan 43'	Attendance: 2,000; Referee: J M Martin

15 December 1945 Division B	Stenhousemuir	2–2	Dumbarton	Ochilview Park
	Newman 78'; Clark 85'		Neil 2'; McMillan 10'	Attendance: 1,000; Referee: J M Martin

22 December 1945 Division B	Dumbarton	4–1	Alloa Athletic	Boghead Park
	Bartleman 5'; McGowan 18'; Trialist 50'; McMillan 72'		Gray 25'	Attendance: 3,000; Referee: W M Crawford

29 December 1945 Division B	Dunfermline Athletic	1–1	Dumbarton	East End Park
	Gilmour 41'		Neil 83'	Attendance: 3,000; Referee: M McEwan

1 January 1946 Division B	Dumbarton	1–3	Ayr United	Boghead Park
	Bootland		Goal	Referee: J Brownlie

2 January 1946 Division B	Dundee United	4–1	Dumbarton	Tannadice Park
	Hunter; Kay (o.g.); McKinnon; Shufflebottom		McGowan	Attendance: 6,500

5 January 1946 Division B	East Fife	6–2	Dumbarton	Bayview Stadium
	Smith 39', 73'; Adamson 43', 50'; Sneddon 61'; Adams 81'		Murphy 17'; Campbell 52'	Attendance: 3,000; Referee: R Calder

12 January 1946 Division B	Dumbarton	3–1	Cowdenbeath	Boghead Park
	Bartleman 39'; Neil 44'; Bootland 55'		Fraser 82'	Attendance: 2,000; Referee: J Brownlie

19 January 1946 Division B	Airdrie	3–2	Dumbarton	Broomfield Park
	Aitken 44', 85'; McCulloch 87'		Neil 54'; Bartleman 57'	Attendance: 3,000; Referee: J Thompson

== League Cup South ==
The story in the League Cup South was a familiar one, with Dumbarton failing to qualify from their section games.

23 February 1946 Div B Grp B	Dumbarton	0–1	Ayr United	Boghead Park
			Harper 56'	Attendance: 5,000; Referee: W Davidson

2 March 1946 Div B Grp B	Stenhousemuir	0–2	Dumbarton	Ochilview Park
			McDonald 20'; Bootland 59'	Attendance: 1,500; Referee: J Cox

9 March 1946 Div B Grp B	Dundee United	3–2	Dumbarton	Tannadice Park
	McKay 3'; Cabrelli 63'; Buchan 89'		McDonald 6'; McGowan 55'	Attendance: 9,000; Referee: J Thompson

16 March 1946 Div B Grp B	Ayr United	3–1	Dumbarton	Somerset Park
	Smith 33'; Morrison 58', 81'		Bartleman 73'	Attendance: 7,900; Referee: W Brown

23 March 1946 Div B Grp B	Dumbarton	1–3	Stenhousemuir	Boghead Park
	McGowan 1'		Donaldson 4', 70'; Newall 80'	Attendance: 2,000; Referee: R Maxwell

30 March 1946 Div B Grp B	Dumbarton	1–2	Dundee United	Boghead Park
	McGowan 48'		Pacione 18', 30'	Referee: R G Benzie

== Supplementary Cup ==
The Summer Cup was replaced for B Division teams with a Supplementary Cup, and Dumbarton reached the final only to lose out to Airdrie.

26 January 1946 1st Rnd 1st Leg	Stenhousemuir	1–6	Dumbarton	Ochilview Park
	Donald 7'		McNamara 40'; McGowan 58', 88'; McDonald 70'; Neil 70'; Bootland 87'	Attendance: 1,000; Referee: R Calder

2 February 1946 1st Rnd 2nd Leg	Dumbarton	2–2 (8–3 agg.)	Stenhousemuir	Boghead Park
	McGowan 17'; Neil 59'		Donaldson 19'; Arbuckle 61'	Attendance: 2,000; Referee: W Webb

16 February 1946 Semi-final	East Fife	0–1	Dumbarton	Ochilview Park
			Bootland 31'	Attendance: 7,500; Referee: C Blues

17 April 1946 Final	Airdrie	2–1	Dumbarton	Ibrox Park
	Peters; Aitken		Bootland 44'	Referee: W Webb

== Victory Cup ==
As in 1919, a special Victory Cup was played for, but for Dumbarton there was a first round exit, to Airdrie.

20 April 1946 1st Rnd 1st Leg	Airdrie	4–0	Dumbarton	Broomfield Park
	Aitken 4', 27'; Watson 37'; McCulloch 87'			Attendance: 7,400; Referee: W G Livingston

24 April 1946 1st Rnd 2nd Leg	Dumbarton	1–1 (1–5 agg.)	Airdrie	Boghead Park
	Bootland		Flavell 10'

== Stirlingshire Cup ==
The Stirlingshire Cup competition was re-established for the first time since 1939, with Dumbarton falling at the semi-final stage to A Division opponents, Falkirk. The competition was however never completed.

5 September 1945 1st Rnd 1st Leg	Stirling Albion	3–2	Dumbarton	Annfield Stadium
	Gourlay 30'; Campbell 57'; Sanders 75'		Hepburn 21'; Murphy 70'	Attendance: 3,000

5 September 1945 1st Rnd 2nd Leg	Dumbarton	4–0 (6–3 agg.)	Stirling Albion	Boghead Park
	McGowan 35'; Smith			Attendance: 2,500; Referee: W Davidson

11 May 1946 Semi-final	Falkirk	2–1	Dumbarton	Brockville Park
	Brooks 23', 48'		Neilson 75'	Referee: J Godfrey

== Player statistics ==
No.	Pos	Nat	Player	Total		Southern Division		Supplementary Cup		League Cup		Victory Cup	
No.	Pos	Nat	Player	Apps	Goals	Apps	Goals	Apps	Goals	Apps	Goals	Apps	Goals
	GK	(Scotland) SCO	Archibald Dingley	3	0	3	0	0	0	0	0	0	0
	GK	(Scotland) SCO	Joe Henderson	11	0	0	0	3	0	6	0	2	0
	GK	(Scotland) SCO	Jim Hoey	12	0	11	0	1	0	0	0	0	0
	GK	(Scotland) SCO	Peter McArthur	6	0	6	0	0	0	0	0	0	0
	GK	(Scotland) SCO	Ian Ogilvie	6	0	6	0	0	0	0	0	0	0
	DF	(Scotland) SCO	James Brown	2	0	0	0	0	0	2	0	0	0
	DF	(Scotland) SCO	Ralph Cowan	2	0	2	0	0	0	0	0	0	0
	DF	(Scotland) SCO	Alex Kay	31	0	26	0	3	0	2	0	0	0
	DF	(Scotland) SCO	Robert Wallace	30	0	19	0	4	0	5	0	2	0
	MF	(Scotland) SCO	George Campbell	37	2	25	2	4	0	6	0	2	0
	MF	(Scotland) SCO	John Craig	5	0	5	0	0	0	0	0	0	0
	MF	(Scotland) SCO	Bobby Donaldson	35	0	23	0	4	0	6	0	2	0
	MF	(Scotland) SCO	Jim Douglas	25	0	16	0	2	0	5	0	2	0
	MF	(Scotland) SCO	Gordon McFarlane	19	0	12	0	3	0	4	0	0	0
	MF	(Scotland) SCO	Bobby Ross	4	0	0	0	1	0	1	0	2	0
	MF	(Scotland) SCO	Jimmy Timmins	5	0	5	0	0	0	0	0	0	0
	MF	(Scotland) SCO	Robert Torrance	2	0	0	0	0	0	2	0	0	0
	FW	(Scotland) SCO	David Bartleman	17	4	11	3	1	0	4	1	1	0
	FW	(Scotland) SCO	Charlie Bootland	27	10	17	5	4	3	4	1	2	1
	FW	(Scotland) SCO	Alexander Filshie	1	0	1	0	0	0	0	0	0	0
	FW	(Scotland) SCO	John Getty	5	0	0	0	2	0	2	0	1	0
	FW	(Scotland) SCO	John Hepburn	5	0	5	0	0	0	0	0	0	0
	FW	(Scotland) SCO	Thomas Jess	2	1	2	1	0	0	0	0	0	0
	FW	(Scotland) SCO	Donald MacMillan	14	7	14	7	0	0	0	0	0	0
	FW	(Scotland) SCO	Ernest Marshall	3	4	3	4	0	0	0	0	0	0
	FW	(Scotland) SCO	Victor McAloney	2	1	2	1	0	0	0	0	0	0
	FW	(Scotland) SCO	Bernard McDonald	24	10	13	7	4	1	5	2	2	0
	FW	(Scotland) SCO	Jimmy McGowan	37	19	25	13	4	3	6	3	2	0
	FW	(Scotland) SCO	Hugh McNamara	8	4	7	3	1	1	0	0	0	0
	FW	(Scotland) SCO	Robert Murphy	9	2	9	2	0	0	0	0	0	0
	FW	(Scotland) SCO	William Neil	20	9	9	7	3	2	6	0	2	0
	FW	(Scotland) SCO	Jimmy Smith	6	0	6	0	0	0	0	0	0	0
	FW	(Scotland) SCO	Trialists	3	0	3	0	0	0	0	0	0	0

=== Transfers ===
==== Players in ====
Player	From	Date
(Scotland) Jim Douglas	(Scotland) Clyde	18 May 1945
(Scotland) Bernard McDonald	(Scotland)	14 Aug 1945
(Scotland) Thomas O'Reilly	(Scotland)	1 Sep 1945
(Scotland) Peter McArthur	(Scotland) Clyde	12 Sep 1945
(Scotland) Hugh McNamara	(Scotland) Clyde	4 Oct 1945
(Scotland) Thomas Jess	(Scotland) St Mirren	6 Oct 1945
(Scotland) Charlie Bootland	(Scotland) amateur	15 Oct 1945
(Scotland) Archiblad Dingley	(Scotland) Ayr United	16 Oct 1945
(Scotland) Alexander Filshie	(Scotland) Morton	8 Nov 1945
(Scotland) William Neil	(Scotland) Rangers	20 Nov 1945
(Scotland) David Bartleman	(Scotland) Burnbank Athletic	29 Nov 1945
(Scotland) Ralph Cowan	(Scotland) Rangers	1 Jan 1946
(Scotland) James Brown	(Scotland)	23 Feb 1946
(Scotland) Ian Ogilvie	(Scotland) Forfar Celtic	
(Scotland) Bobby Ross	(Scotland) Rangers	
(Scotland) Gordon MacFarlane	(Scotland)	
(Scotland) Jimmy Smith	(Scotland)	

==== Players out ====
Player	To	Date
(Scotland) Willie Reid	(Scotland) St Mirren	23 May 1945
(Scotland) George Brooks	(Scotland) Falkirk	26 May 1945
(Scotland) Robert Murphy	(Scotland) Released	1 Jul 1945
(Scotland) George Jeffrey	(Scotland) Hamilton	30 Aug 1945
(Scotland) Thomas O'Reilly	(Scotland)	17 Sep 1945
(Scotland) John Hepburn	(Scotland) Clyde	4 Oct 1945
(Scotland) Peter McArthur	(Scotland) Released	26 Oct 1945
(Scotland) Ernest Marshall	(Scotland) Released	22 Nov 1945
(Scotland) Archibald Dingley	(Scotland) amateur	12 Jan 1946
(Scotland) Joseph Henderson	(Scotland) Hibernian (loan)	30 Jan 1946
(Scotland) Hugh McNamara	(Scotland) released	2 Feb 1946
(Scotland) Ralph Cowan	(Scotland) Stirling Albion	20 Feb 1946
(Scotland) John Browning	(Scotland) Albion Rovers	

In addition Andrew Bartleman, David Boyd, Tom Brawley, Andrew Cheyne, Frank Douglas, Stan Gullan, James Hoy, Jackie Milne, John Mulvaney, Vincent Pritchard and David Watson would all have played their last 1st team game for Dumbarton before the end of the season.
