= 1943–44 Dumbarton F.C. season =

Dumbarton
1943–1944 season
- Stadium: Boghead Park, Dumbarton
- Scottish Southern League: 5th
- Summer Cup: First Round
- League Cup South: Prelims
- Top goalscorer: League: George Brooks (20); All: George Brooks (24)
- Highest home attendance: 8,000
- Lowest home attendance: 3,000
- Average home league attendance: 4,770

The 1943–44 season was the fifth Scottish football season in which Dumbarton competed in regional football during World War II.

== Scottish Southern League ==
Dumbarton had their best performance to date in their fourth season in the Scottish Southern League. Indeed, for two weeks in October 1943 Dumbarton topped the league. However, with only two wins recorded after the New Year it was a 5th-place finish out of 16 that was achieved with 32 points - 18 behind champions Rangers. Nevertheless, the league results included a first ever league win over Celtic at Celtic Park.

14 August 1943 League	Dumbarton	3–1	Airdrie	Boghead Park
	Stead 46'; Reid 48'; Milne 53'		Aitken 20'	Attendance: 4,000; Referee: W Brown

21 August 1943 League	Third Lanark	2–3	Dumbarton	Cathkin Park
	Fraser 16'; Jones 78'		Hepburn 15'; Brooks 75', 80'	Attendance: 4,000

28 August 1943 League	Dumbarton	2–1	St Mirren	Boghead Park
	Hepburn 77'; Brooks 78'		Linwood 85'	Attendance: 5,000

4 September 1943 League	Celtic	1–4	Dumbarton	Celtic Park
	Gallacher 84'		Lipton 8', 22'; Hepburn 25'; Reid 65'	Attendance: 9,000; Referee: C R Blues

11 September 1943 League	Dumbarton	2–3	Falkirk	Boghead Park
	Brooks 12'; Milne 86' (pen.)		Ogilvie 55'; Fitzsimmons 75'; Inglis 87'	Attendance: 5,500; Referee: W Webb

18 September 1943 League	Hibernian	4–3	Dumbarton	Easter Road Stadium
	Smith 16', 41', 49' (pen.); Caskie 43'		Milne 39' (pen.); Brooks 58'; Stead 64'	Attendance: 12,000

25 September 1943 League	Dumbarton	4–2	Motherwell	Boghead Park
	Brooks 26', 72', 80'; Milne 60' (pen.)		Gillan 63'; Gibson 89'	Attendance: 4,000

2 October 1943 League	Partick Thistle	2–6	Dumbarton	Firhill Park
	Leitch 60', 89'		Brooks 24', 47', 85'; Brawley 25'; Stead 37', 86'	Attendance: 10,000; Referee: W Webb

9 October 1943 League	Dumbarton	2–1	Queen's Park	Boghead Park
	Milne 14'; Torrance 20'		Aitkenhead 62'	Attendance: 3,000

16 October 1943 League	Dumbarton	3–2	Hamilton	Boghead Park
	Torrance 17'; Brooks 60'; Stead 70'		Hood 1'; Robinson 55'	Attendance: 5,000

23 October 1943 League	Albion Rovers	0–1	Dumbarton	Cliftonhill
			Brooks 40'	Attendance: 6,000; Referee: J Godfrey

30 October 1943 League	Dumbarton	1–4	Morton	Boghead Park
	Brooks 52'		Maxwell 32', 63'; White 35'; Campbell 47'	Attendance: 6,000; Referee: J R Boyd

6 November 1943 League	Hearts	3–0	Dumbarton	Tynecastle Stadium
	Miller 11'; Gillies 53'; Kelly 65'			Attendance: 12,000

13 November 1943 League	Dumbarton	1–0	Clyde	Boghead Park
	Brooks 75'			Attendance: 5,000

20 November 1943 League	Rangers	2–0	Dumbarton	Ibrox Park
	Duncanson 18', 46'			Attendance: 20,000; Referee: W Livingstone

27 November 1943 League	Airdrie	1–3	Dumbarton	Broomfield Park
	O'Sullivan 75'		Milne 13' (pen.); Reid 28', 84'	Attendance: 3,000

4 December 1943 League	Dumbarton	2–3	Third Lanark	Boghead Park
	Brooks 48', 58'		Henderson 64', 88'; McLean 86'	Attendance: 4,000

11 December 1943 League	St Mirren	5–2	Dumbarton	Love Street (stadium)
	Stenhouse 7', 55', 75'; Junior 50'; Kelly 85' (pen.)		Trialist 80'; Lipton 89'	Attendance: 3,000

18 December 1943 League	Dumbarton	1–1	Celtic	Boghead Park
	Douglas 46'		McDonald 79' (pen.)	Attendance: 7,000

25 December 1943 League	Dumbarton	1–1	Hibernian	Boghead Park
	Brooks 35'		Cuthberson 12'	Attendance: 3,500

1 January 1944 League	Falkirk	4–0	Dumbarton	Brockville Park
	Fitzsimmons 16', 70'; Napier 24'; Brady 48'			Attendance: 5,000; Referee: J Cox

3 January 1944 League	Dumbarton	1–1	Rangers	Boghead Park
	Brooks		Smith	Attendance: 8,000

8 January 1944 League	Motherwell	2–0	Dumbarton	Fir Park
	Main 17'; Gillan 40'			Attendance: 3,000; Referee: J Thomson

15 January 1944 League	Dumbarton	2–2	Partick Thistle	Boghead Park
	Milne, Jk 60' (pen.); Milne, Jn 79'		Newall 32'; Glover 52'	Attendance: 5,000; Referee: C Blues

22 January 1944 League	Queen's Park	0–0	Dumbarton	Hampden Park
				Attendance: 5,000; Referee: P Craigmyle

29 January 1944 League	Hamilton	0–1	Dumbarton	Douglas Park
			Brooks 53'	Attendance: 3,000

5 February 1944 League	Dumbarton	2–2	Albion Rovers	Boghead Park
	Pritchard 53', 60'		Mooney 5'; McDonald 87'	Attendance: 3,000; Referee: W Davidson

12 February 1944 League	Morton	3–1	Dumbarton	Cappielow Park
	Henderson 5'; McKenzie 67'; Kelly 86'		Milne 39'	Attendance: 5,000

19 February 1944 League	Dumbarton	2–1	Hearts	Boghead Park
	Blyth 22' (o.g.); Craig 55'		Blyth 54'	Attendance: 3,500

26 February 1944 League	Clyde	4–1	Dumbarton	Shawfield Stadium
	Wallace 20'; Mills 28'; Johnstone 30', 82'		Milne 25'	Attendance: 5,000

== League Cup South ==
Despite an unbeaten away record, Dumbarton failed to qualify from their section in the League Cup South.

4 March 1944 Group D	Dumbarton	1–4	Queen's Park	Boghead Park
	Milne 55'		Jordan 10'; Gallacher 58'; Aitkenhead 85'; Harris 88'	Attendance: 4,000

11 March 1944 Group D	Clyde	0–1	Dumbarton	Shawfield Stadium
			Pritchard 47'	Attendance: 10,000

18 March 1944 Group D	St Mirren	2–2	Dumbarton	Love Street (stadium)
	Linwood 65'; Kennedy 78'		Brooks 73', 76'	Attendance: 8,000

25 March 1944 Group D	Queen's Park	0–2	Dumbarton	Hampden Park
			Reid 52'; Brooks 86'	Attendance: 10,000

1 April 1944 Group D	Dumbarton	1–3	Clyde	Boghead Park
	Hickie 10' (o.g.)		Wallace 30'; Agnew 53', 83'	Attendance: 6,000

8 April 1944 Group D	Dumbarton	2–1	St Mirren	Boghead Park
	Pritchard 10'; Brooks 40'		Linwood 88'	Attendance: 3,500

== Summer Cup ==
Dumbarton suffered a heavy defeat at the hands of Clyde in the first round of the Summer Cup.

3 June 1944 Cup 1(1)	Dumbarton	2–4	Clyde	Boghead Park
	Pritchard 47'; Brawley 61'		Johnstone 1'; Gillies 33', 59', 75'	Attendance: 3,000; Referee: W Webb

10 June 1944 Cup 1(2)	Clyde	6–0 (10–2 agg.)	Dumbarton	Shawfield Stadium
	Gillies 10', 25', 36'; Johnstone 30', 73', 86'			Attendance: 6,000

== Player statistics ==
No.	Pos	Nat	Player	Total		Southern Division		Summer Cup		League Cup	
No.	Pos	Nat	Player	Apps	Goals	Apps	Goals	Apps	Goals	Apps	Goals
	GK	(Scotland) SCO	Brendan Bell	18	0	12	0	2	0	4	0
	GK	(Scotland) SCO	David Watson	20	0	18	0	0	0	2	0
	DF	(Scotland) SCO	Andy Cheyne	30	0	22	0	2	0	6	0
	DF	(Scotland) SCO	Alex Kay	1	0	0	0	1	0	0	0
	DF	(Scotland) SCO	John Morgan	2	0	2	0	0	0	0	0
	DF	(Scotland) SCO	James Mulvaney	13	0	13	0	0	0	0	0
	DF	(Scotland) SCO	Robert Wallace	22	0	16	0	1	0	5	0
	MF	(Scotland) SCO	Tom Brawley	26	2	22	1	2	1	2	0
	MF	(Scotland) SCO	John Craig	30	1	24	1	1	0	5	0
	MF	(Scotland) SCO	Bobby Donaldson	1	0	0	0	1	0	0	0
	MF	(Scotland) SCO	Andrew McAlpine	38	0	30	0	2	0	6	0
	MF	(Scotland) SCO	Douglas McBain	3	0	3	0	0	0	0	0
	MF	(Scotland) SCO	Jackie Milne	37	10	29	9	2	0	6	1
	MF	(Scotland) SCO	Willie Reid	28	5	23	4	0	0	5	1
	FW	(Scotland) SCO	James Anderson	5	0	2	0	0	0	3	0
	FW	(Scotland) SCO	Andrew Boyd	1	0	0	0	1	0	0	0
	FW	(Scotland) SCO	George Brooks	38	24	30	20	2	0	6	4
	FW	(Scotland) SCO	Frank Douglas	15	1	14	1	0	0	1	0
	FW	(Scotland) SCO	John Hepburn	28	3	20	3	2	0	6	0
	FW	(Scotland) SCO	Thomas Lipton	8	2	8	2	0	0	0	0
	FW	(Scotland) SCO	Ian McColl	1	0	1	0	0	0	0	0
	FW	(Scotland) SCO	Murdoch McCormack	5	0	5	0	0	0	0	0
	FW	(Scotland) SCO	John Milne	1	1	1	1	0	0	0	0
	FW	(Scotland) SCO	Vince Pritchard	9	5	2	2	2	1	5	2
	FW	(Scotland) SCO	Angus Stead	24	6	22	6	0	0	2	0
	FW	(Scotland) SCO	Robert Torrance	9	2	6	2	1	0	2	0
	FW	(Scotland) SCO	Trialists	5	1	5	1	0	0	0	0

=== Transfers ===
==== Players in ====
Player	From	Date
(Scotland) Brendon Bell	(Scotland) Kirkintilloch Rob Roy	7 Jul 1943
(Scotland) George Brooks	(Scotland) Benburb	7 Jul 1943
(Scotland) Thomas Lipton	(Scotland) St Anthony's	9 Aug 1943
(Scotland) Andrew McAlpine	(Scotland) Fauldhouse United	25 Aug 1943
(Scotland) Robert Wallace	(Scotland) Hamilton Academical	2 Oct 1943
(Scotland) Frank Douglas	(Scotland) Renfrew	8 Dec 1943
(Scotland) James Anderson	(Scotland) Partick Thistle	5 Feb 1944
(Scotland) Albert McLean	(Scotland) Glasgow Perthshire	18 Mar 1944
(Scotland) Bobby Donaldson	(Scotland) Bathgate Thistle (loan)	22 Apr 1944
(Scotland) James Hoy	(Scotland) Glasgow Perthshire	22 Apr 1944
(Scotland) Alex Kay	(Scotland) (loan)	25 May 1944
(Scotland) Tom Brawley	(England) Stoke City	
(Scotland) Ian McCall	(Scotland) Vale of Leven (loan)	
(Scotland) Andrew Boyd	(Scotland) {loan}	
(Scotland) John Milne	(Scotland) {loan}	
(Scotland) David Watson	(Scotland)	

==== Players out ====
Player	To	Date
(Scotland) James Hornell	(Scotland) Released	8 Jul 1943
(Scotland) Willie Reid	(Scotland) Cowdenbeath (loan)	3 Aug 1943
(Scotland) John Morgan	(Scotland) Released	11 Dec 1943
(Scotland) Murdoch McCormack	(Scotland) Released	11 Dec 1943
(Scotland) Douglas McBain	(Scotland) Amateur	12 Apr 1944

In addition George Henderson and John Honeyman both played their last games in Dumbarton 'colours'.

== Reserve team ==
Dumbarton continued to run a Second XI during the season.

In the Scottish Second XI Cup, Dumbarton lost in the second round to St Mirren, and finished as runners-up in the Glasgow & District Reserve League (First Series).
