= 1946–47 Celtic F.C. season =

Celtic
1946–47 season
- Manager: Jimmy McGrory
- Stadium: Celtic Park
- Scottish Division A: 12th
- Scottish Cup: 1st round
- Scottish League Cup: Group stage

During the 1946–47 Scottish football season, Celtic competed in Scottish Division A.

== Competitions ==
=== Scottish Division A ===
==== League table ====
| Pos | Team | Pld | W | D | L | GF | GA | GD | Pts |
|---|---|---|---|---|---|---|---|---|---|
| 5 | Partick Thistle | 30 | 16 | 3 | 11 | 74 | 59 | +15 | 35 |
| 6 | Morton | 30 | 12 | 10 | 8 | 58 | 45 | +13 | 34 |
| 7 | Celtic | 30 | 13 | 6 | 11 | 53 | 55 | −2 | 32 |
| 8 | Motherwell | 30 | 12 | 5 | 13 | 58 | 54 | +4 | 29 |
| 9 | Third Lanark | 30 | 11 | 6 | 13 | 56 | 64 | −8 | 28 |

Source: RSSSF

==== Matches ====
| 10 August 1946 Division A | Celtic | 1–2 | Morton | Glasgow |
| | Rae | Report | Neil 46'; Garth | Stadium: Celtic Park; Attendance: 33,000 |

| 14 August 1946 Division A | Clyde | 2–2 | Celtic | Glasgow |
| | | | | Stadium: Shawfield Stadium; Attendance: 15,000 |

| 17 August 1946 Division A | Aberdeen | 6–2 | Celtic | Aberdeen |
| | | | | Stadium: Pittodrie Park; Attendance: 30,000 |

| 21 August 1946 Division A | Celtic | 2–3 | Hearts | Glasgow |
| | | | | Stadium: Celtic Park; Attendance: 30,000 |

| 28 August 1946 Division A | Hamilton Academical | 2–2 | Celtic | Hamilton |
| | | | | Stadium: Douglas Park; Attendance: 10,000 |

| 31 August 1946 Division A | St Mirren | 0–1 | Celtic | Paisley |
| | | | | Stadium: St Mirren Park, Love Street; Attendance: 12,000 |

| 4 September 1946 Division A | Celtic | 1–4 | Third Lanark | Glasgow |
| | | | | Stadium: Celtic Park; Attendance: 20,000 |

| 7 September 1946 Division A | Celtic | 2–3 | Rangers | Glasgow |
| | | | | Stadium: Celtic Park; Attendance: 28,000 |

| 14 September 1946 Division A | Queen of the South | 3–1 | Celtic | Dumfries |
| | | | | Stadium: Palmerston Park; Attendance: 15,000 |

| 2 November 1946 Division A | Falkirk | 1–4 | Celtic | Falkirk |
| | | | | Stadium: Brockville Park; Attendance: 15,000 |

| 9 November 1946 Division A | Celtic | 4–1 | Hibernian | Glasgow |
| | | | | Stadium: Celtic Park; Attendance: 45,000 |

| 16 November 1946 Division A | Partick Thistle | 4–1 | Celtic | Glasgow |
| | | | | Stadium: Firhill Park; Attendance: 40,000 |

| 23 November 1946 Division A | Motherwell | 1–2 | Celtic | Motherwell |
| | | | | Stadium: Fir Park; Attendance: 15,000 |

| 30 November 1946 Division A | Celtic | 4–2 | Kilmarnock | Glasgow |
| | | | | Stadium: Celtic Park; Attendance: 15,000 |

| 7 December 1946 Division A | Morton | 2–1 | Celtic | Greenock |
| | | | | Stadium: Cappielow Park; Attendance: 12,000 |

| 14 December 1946 Division A | Celtic | 3–3 | Clyde | Glasgow |
| | | | | Stadium: Celtic Park; Attendance: 18,000 |

| 21 December 1946 Division A | Hearts | 2–1 | Celtic | Edinburgh |
| | | | | Stadium: Tynecastle Park; Attendance: 20,722 |

| 25 December 1946 Division A | Celtic | 1–0 | Queen's Park | Glasgow |
| | | | | Stadium: Celtic Park; Attendance: 15,000 |

| 28 December 1946 Division A | Celtic | 2–1 | Hamilton Academical | Glasgow |
| | | | | Stadium: Celtic Park; Attendance: 15,000 |

| 1 January 1947 Division A | Rangers | 1–1 | Celtic | Glasgow |
| | | | | Stadium: Ibrox Park; Attendance: 85,000 |

| 2 January 1947 Division A | Celtic | 1–5 | Aberdeen | Glasgow |
| | | | | Stadium: Celtic Park; Attendance: 25,000 |

| 4 January 1947 Division A | Celtic | 2–0 | Queen of the South | Glasgow |
| | | | | Stadium: Celtic Park; Attendance: 10,000 |

| 11 January 1947 Division A | Queen's Park | 1–3 | Celtic | Glasgow |
| | | | | Stadium: Hampden Park; Attendance: 12,059 |

| 18 January 1947 Division A | Third Lanark | 0–0 | Celtic | Glasgow |
| | | | | Stadium: Cathkin Park; Attendance: 28,392 |

| 22 February 1947 Division A | Celtic | 2–1 | St Mirren | Glasgow |
| | | | | Stadium: Celtic Park; Attendance: 9,900 |

| 22 March 1947 Division A | Celtic | 2–0 | Partick Thistle | Glasgow |
| | | | | Stadium: Celtic Park; Attendance: 15,000 |

| 29 March 1947 Division A | Kilmarnock | 1–2 | Celtic | Kilmarnock |
| | | | | Stadium: Rugby Park; Attendance: 12,000 |

| 12 April 1947 Division A | Hibernian | 2–0 | Celtic | Edinburgh |
| | | | | Stadium: Easter Road; Attendance: 25,000 |

| 26 April 1947 Division A | Celtic | 0–0 | Falkirk | Glasgow |
| | | | | Stadium: Celtic Park; Attendance: 12,000 |

| 3 May 1947 Division A | Celtic | 3–2 | Motherwell | Glasgow |
| 15:00 BST | | | | Stadium: Celtic Park; Attendance: 7,000 |

=== Scottish Cup ===
| 25 January 1947 First round | Dundee | 2–1 | Celtic | Dundee |
| | | | | Stadium: Dens Park; Attendance: 36,000 |

=== Scottish League Cup ===
| 21 September 1946 Group 8 | Hibernian | 4–2 | Celtic | Edinburgh |
| | | | | Stadium: Easter Road; Attendance: 20,000 |

| 28 September 1946 Group 8 | Celtic | 0–0 | Third Lanark | Glasgow |
| | | | | Stadium: Celtic Park; Attendance: 15,000 |

| 5 October 1946 Group 8 | Hamilton Academical | 2–2 | Celtic | Hamilton |
| | | | | Stadium: Douglas Park; Attendance: 18,000 |

| 12 October 1946 Group 8 | Celtic | 1–1 | Hibernian | Glasgow |
| | | | | Stadium: Celtic Park; Attendance: 40,000 |

| 19 October 1946 Group 8 | Third Lanark | 2–3 | Celtic | Glasgow |
| | | | | Stadium: Cathkin Park; Attendance: 24,664 |

| 26 October 1946 Group 8 | Celtic | 3–1 | Hamilton Academical | Glasgow |
| | | | | Stadium: Celtic Park; Attendance: 15,000 |
