= 1946–47 Heart of Midlothian F.C. season =

Heart of Midlothian
1947–48 season
- Manager: David McLean
- Stadium: Tynecastle Park
- Scottish First Division: 4th
- Scottish Cup: Round 4
- League Cup: Semi-final

During the 1946–47 season Hearts competed in the Scottish First Division, the Scottish Cup, the Scottish League Cup and the East of Scotland Shield.

== Fixtures ==
=== Friendlies ===
21 April 1947 Friendly	Hearts	1–4	Chelsea	Tynecastle Park
	Goal

=== East of Scotland Shield ===
30 April 1947 Semi-Final	Hearts	4–1	Leith Athletic	Tynecastle Park

12 May 1947 Final	Hearts	1–2	Hibernian	Tynecastle Park

=== League Cup ===
21 September 1946 League Cup Group	Clyde	1–2	Hearts	Shawfield Stadium
				Attendance: 12,000

28 September 1946 League Cup Group	Hearts	3–1	Kilmarnock	Tynecastle Park
				Attendance: 26,757

5 October 1946 League Cup Group	Partick Thistle	4–4	Hearts	Firhill Park
				Attendance: 25,000

12 October 1946 League Cup Group	Hearts	2–1	Clyde	Tynecastle Park
				Attendance: 30,560

19 October 1946 League Cup Group	Kilmarnock	2–0	Hearts	Rugby Park
				Attendance: 20,000

26 October 1946 League Cup Group	Hearts	1–1	Partick Thistle	Tynecastle Park
				Attendance: 31,623

1 March 1947 League Cup Quarter-Final 1st Leg	Hearts	0–1	East Fife	Tynecastle Park
				Attendance: 20,804

5 March 1947 League Cup Quarter-Final 2nd Leg	East Fife	2–5	Hearts	Bayview Park
				Attendance: 11,000

22 March 1947 League Cup Semi-Final	Aberdeen	6–2	Hearts	Easter Road
				Attendance: 36,201

=== Scottish Cup ===
25 January 1947 Scottish Cup R1	Hearts	3–0	St Johnstone	Tynecastle Park
				Attendance: 19,336

15 February 1947 Scottish Cup R2	bye into Round 3

8 March 1947 Scottish Cup R3	Hearts	2–1	Cowdenbeath	Tynecastle Park
				Attendance: 18,700

15 March 1947 Scottish Cup R4	Arbroath	2–1	Hearts	Gayfield Park
				Attendance: 9,000

=== Scottish First Division ===
10 August 1946 Scottish First Division	Falkirk	3–3	Hearts	Brockville Park
				Attendance: 18,000

14 August 1946 Scottish First Division	Hearts	1–4	Partick Thistle	Tynecastle Park
				Attendance: 20,821

17 August 1946 Scottish First Division	Hearts	4–1	Third Lanark	Tynecastle Park
				Attendance: 20,911

21 August 1946 Scottish First Division	Celtic	2–3	Hearts	Celtic Park
				Attendance: 30,000

24 August 1946 Scottish First Division	Motherwell	0–2	Hearts	Fir Park
				Attendance: 9,000

28 August 1946 Scottish First Division	Hearts	2–2	St Mirren	Tynecastle Park
				Attendance: 17,454

31 August 1946 Scottish First Division	Hearts	1–1	Queen of the South	Tynecastle Park
				Attendance: 20,605

4 September 1946 Scottish First Division	Hamilton Academical	3–1	Hearts	Douglas Park
				Attendance: 7,000

7 September 1946 Scottish First Division	Hibernian	0–1	Hearts	Easter Road
				Attendance: 39,000

14 September 1946 Scottish First Division	Hearts	2–0	Kilmarnock	Tynecastle Park
				Attendance: 17,691

2 November 1946 Scottish First Division	Queen's Park	2–2	Hearts	Hampden Park
				Attendance: 11,460

9 November 1946 Scottish First Division	Hearts	2–1	Clyde	Tynecastle Park
				Attendance: 22,783

16 November 1946 Scottish First Division	Morton	0–1	Hearts	Cappielow Park
				Attendance: 10,000

23 November 1946 Scottish First Division	Aberdeen	2–1	Hearts	Pittodrie Park
				Attendance: 14,000

30 November 1946 Scottish First Division	Hearts	0–3	Rangers	Tynecastle Park
				Attendance: 44,532

7 December 1946 Scottish First Division	Hearts	1–1	Falkirk	Tynecastle Park
				Attendance: 12,815

14 December 1947 Scottish First Division	Partick Thistle	1–2	Hearts	Easter Road
				Attendance: 10,000

21 December 1946 Scottish First Division	Hearts	2–1	Celtic	Tynecastle Park
				Attendance: 20,722

28 December 1946 Scottish First Division	St Mirren	1–0	Hearts	St Mirren Park, Love Street
				Attendance: 10,000

1 January 1947 Scottish First Division	Hearts	2–3	Hibernian	Tynecastle Park
				Attendance: 33,810

2 January 1947 Scottish First Division	Third Lanark	4–1	Hearts	Cathkin Park
				Attendance: 13,510

4 January 1947 Scottish First Division	Kilmarnock	0–0	Hearts	Tynecastle Park
				Attendance: 10,000

11 January 1947 Scottish First Division	Hearts	2–1	Motherwell	Tynecastle Park
				Attendance: 13,156

18 January 1947 Scottish First Division	Hearts	4–3	Hamilton Academical	Tynecastle Park
				Attendance: 16,777

1 February 1947 Scottish First Division	Queen of the South	0–1	Hearts	Palmerston Park
				Attendance: 7,000

8 February 1947 Scottish First Division	Clyde	0–2	Hearts	Shawfield Stadium
				Attendance: 7,000

29 March 1947 Scottish First Division	Hearts	1–3	Queen's Park	Tynecastle Park
				Attendance: 4,723

5 April 1947 Scottish First Division	Hearts	2–0	Morton	Tynecastle Park
				Attendance: 7,000

7 April 1947 Scottish First Division	Rangers	1–2	Hearts	Ibrox Park
				Attendance: 12,000

17 April 1947 Scottish First Division	Hearts	4–0	Aberdeen	Tynecastle Park
				Attendance: 15,844

== See also ==
- List of Heart of Midlothian F.C. seasons
