= 1943–44 Celtic F.C. season =

Celtic
1944–45 season
- Manager: Jimmy McStay
- Stadium: Celtic Park
- Southern League: 2nd
- Southern League Cup: Group stage

During the 1943–44 Scottish football season, Celtic competed in the Southern Football League.

== Competitions ==
=== Southern Football League ===
==== League table ====
Pos	Team	Pld	W	D	L	GF	GA	GD	Pts
1	Rangers (C)	30	23	4	3	90	27	+63	50
2	Celtic	30	18	7	5	71	43	+28	43
3	Hibernian	30	17	4	9	72	54	+18	38
4	Heart of Midlothian	30	14	7	9	67	50	+17	35
5	Dumbarton	30	13	6	11	54	58	−4	32

Source: The Celtic Wiki – Southern Football League
Rules for classification: 1) points; 2) goal difference; 3) number of goals scored.
(C) Champions

==== Matches ====
14 August 1943 Southern League	Clyde	1–2	Celtic	Glasgow
				Stadium: Shawfield Stadium

21 August 1943 Southern League	Celtic	2–1	Morton	Glasgow
				Stadium: Celtic Park

4 September 1943 Southern League	Celtic	1–4	Dumbarton	Glasgow
				Stadium: Celtic Park

11 September 1943 Southern League	Rangers	0–1	Celtic	Glasgow
				Stadium: Ibrox Park

18 September 1943 Southern League	Celtic	1–0	Hamilton Academical	Glasgow
				Stadium: Celtic Park

25 September 1943 Southern League	Hearts	0–0	Celtic	Edinburgh
				Stadium: Tynecastle Park

2 October 1943 Southern League	Celtic	3–2	Albion Rovers	Glasgow
				Stadium: Celtic Park

9 October 1943 Southern League	Celtic	4–5	Partick Thistle	Glasgow
				Stadium: Celtic Park

16 October 1943 Southern League	Airdrieonians	1–3	Celtic	Airdrie
				Stadium: Broomfield Park

23 October 1943 Southern League	Celtic	3–2	Falkirk	Glasgow
				Stadium: Celtic Park

30 October 1945 Southern League	Hibernian	2–2	Celtic	Edinburgh
				Stadium: Easter Road

6 November 1943 Southern League	Celtic	2–1	Motherwell	Glasgow
				Stadium: Celtic Park

13 November 1943 Southern League	Celtic	5–0	St Mirren	Glasgow
				Stadium: Celtic Park

20 November 1943 Southern League	Third Lanark	3–4	Celtic	Glasgow
				Stadium: Cathkin Park

27 November 1943 Southern League	Celtic	4–0	Clyde	Glasgow
				Stadium: Celtic Park

4 December 1943 Southern League	Morton	1–1	Celtic	Greenock
				Stadium: Cappielow Park

11 December 1943 Southern League	Celtic	2–0	Queen's Park	Glasgow
				Stadium: Celtic Park

18 December 1943 Southern League	Dumbarton	1–1	Celtic	Dumbarton
				Stadium: Boghead Park

25 December 1943 Southern League	Hamilton Academical	3–3	Celtic	Hamilton
				Stadium: Douglas Park

1 January 1944 Southern League	Celtic	1–3	Rangers	Glasgow
				Stadium: Celtic Park

3 January 1944 Southern League	Celtic	4–0	Third Lanark	Glasgow
				Stadium: Celtic Park

8 January 1944 Southern League	Celtic	4–0	Hearts	Glasgow
				Stadium: Celtic Park

15 January 1944 Southern League	Albion Rovers	2–1	Celtic	Coatbridge
				Stadium: Cliftonhill

22 January 1944 Southern League	Partick Thistle	1–2	Celtic	Glasgow
				Stadium: Firhill Park

29 January 1944 Southern League	Celtic	3–1	Airdrieonians	Glasgow
				Stadium: Celtic Park

5 February 1944 Southern League	Falkirk	3–2	Celtic	Falkirk
				Stadium: Brockville Park

12 February 1944 Southern League	Celtic	2–2	Hibernian	Glasgow
				Stadium: Celtic Park

19 February 1944 Southern League	Motherwell	1–2	Celtic	Motherwell
				Stadium: Fir Park

26 February 1944 Southern League	St Mirren	2–2	Celtic	Paisley
				Stadium: St Mirren Park, Love Street

10 April 1944 Southern League	Queen's Park	1–4	Celtic	Glasgow
				Stadium: Hampden Park

=== Southern League Cup ===
4 March 1944 Group	Celtic	8–1	Hamilton Academical	Glasgow
				Stadium: Celtic Park

11 March 1944 Group	Falkirk	1–3	Celtic	Falkirk
				Stadium: Brockville Park

18 March 1944 Group	Partick Thistle	0–1	Celtic	Glasgow
				Stadium: Firhill Park

25 March 1944 Group	Hamilton Academical	0–3	Celtic	Glasgow
				Stadium: Douglas Park

1 April 1944 Group	Celtic	3–0	Falkirk	Glasgow
				Stadium: Celtic Park

8 April 1944 Group	Celtic	6–0	Partick Thistle	Glasgow
				Stadium: Celtic Park

29 April 1944 Semi-final	Celtic	2–4	Rangers	Glasgow
				Stadium: Hampden Park; Attendance: 87,000
