= Joe Henderson (disambiguation) =

Joe Henderson (1937–2001) was an American jazz saxophonist.

Joe Henderson may also refer to:

- Joe "Mr Piano" Henderson (1920–1980), British pianist
- Joe Henderson (gospel singer) (1937–1964), gospel singer
- Joe Henderson (runner) (born 1943), American runner, running coach, and fitness writer
- Joe Henderson (baseball) (born 1946), MLB player
- Joe Henderson (footballer, born 1924) (1924–1984), Scottish football player
- Lofton R. Henderson (1903–1942), U.S. Marine Corps naval aviator nicknamed Joe
- Joe Henderson (gridiron football) (born 1986), gridiron football linebacker
- Joe Henderson (showrunner)

== See also ==
- Joseph Henderson (disambiguation)
