= Meadowbank =

Meadowbank can refer to:

== Australia ==
- Meadowbank, New South Wales

== Canada ==
- Meadowbank, Prince Edward Island, a community in Prince Edward Island
- Meadowbank Aerodrome, Nunavut
- Meadowbank Gold Mine, Nunavut

== England ==
- Meadowbank, Cheshire, a location in North West England

== New Zealand ==
- Meadowbank, New Zealand, a suburb of Auckland

== Scotland ==
- Meadowbank, Edinburgh
  - Meadowbank Stadium, Edinburgh
  - Old Meadowbank, a now-demolished stadium in Edinburgh
  - New Meadowbank, a now-demolished stadium in Edinburgh
  - Meadowbank Thistle F.C., a Scottish football club that existed from 1974 to 1995
