= Ian Kerr =

Ian Kerr may refer to:

- Ian Kerr (academic) (1965–2019), Canadian academic and expert in emerging law and technology issues
- Ian Kerr (field hockey) (born 1935), New Zealand Olympic field hockey player
- Ian M. Kerr, scientist at University College London
- Ian Kerr Cook (1924–1989), Scottish footballer
- Ian Mackenzie-Kerr (1929–2005), British book designer
