= New Meadowbank =

Sports field in Edinburgh, Scotland

- Location within the City of Edinburgh council area
- Location: Edinburgh, Scotland
- Coordinates: 55.9571°N 3.1586°W
- Owner: Edinburgh Corporation
- Surface: Grass

Construction
- Opened: 1934

Tenant
- Leith Athletic

New Meadowbank was an athletics and football ground in Edinburgh, Scotland. It was the home ground of Leith Athletic during the 1946–47 season. The site was later used to build the modern Meadowbank Stadium.

== History ==
The ground was opened in 1934 by Edinburgh Corporation. It had no covered spectator facilities.

=== Athletics ===
New Meadowbank was used for athletics, and hosted international meetings. It hosted the first post-World War II athletics meet between England, Scotland and Ireland in 1946, and another meet in 1947. It also hosted the annual Scottish Amateur Athletics championship from 1952 until 1966.

=== Football ===
Prior to World War II Leith played at Meadowbank. However, the ground was taken over by the British Army during the war and used as a transport depot; this destroyed the stadium, and in 1946 Leith began rebuilding it. As the Scottish Football League resumed in 1946, Leith were forced to play their home matches at the neighbouring New Meadowbank during the 1946–47 season.

The original Meadowbank, now renamed Old Meadowbank was reopened at the start of the 1947–48 season, and Leith returned to their previous home.
