= Joseph Henderson =

Joseph Henderson may refer to:

- Joseph Henderson (artist) (1832–1908), Scottish painter
- Joseph Henderson (Medal of Honor) (1869–1938), recipient of the Medal of Honor for actions during the Moro Uprising in 1909
- Joseph Henderson (Pennsylvania politician) (1791–1863), United States Congressman from Pennsylvania
- Joseph Henderson, 1st Baron Henderson of Ardwick (1884–1950), British Labour Member of Parliament for Manchester Ardwick 1931 and 1935–1950
- Joseph Henderson (pilot) (1826–1890), Sandy Hook pilot in New York harbor and along the Atlantic Coast during the Civil War
- Joseph Welles Henderson (1890–1957), acting president of Bucknell University, 1953–1954
- Joseph L. Henderson (1903–2007), American physician and psychologist.
- Joseph Morris Henderson (1863–1936), Scottish painter

== See also ==
- Joe Henderson (disambiguation)
- Joey Henderson, fictional character on Shortland Street
