= Rex Dunlop =

Scottish footballer (1927–2019)

Personal information
- Full name: William Rex Dunlop
- Date of birth: 21 September 1927
- Place of birth: Dumfries, Scotland
- Date of death: 20 May 2019 (aged 91)
- Place of death: Whitehaven, England
- Position: Forward

Youth career
- Baillieston

Senior career*
Years	Team	Apps	(Gls)
1948–1950	Rangers		
1949–1950	Dumbarton	6	(0)
1950–1954	Rangers	3	(0)
1953–1956	Workington	110	(19)
1957–1961	Cheltenham Town		
- * Club domestic league appearances and goals

William Rex Dunlop (21 September 1927 – 20 May 2019) was a Scottish footballer who played for Rangers and Dumbarton.
