= Jim Forshaw =

Scottish footballer (1919–2015)

James Forshaw
Personal information
- Full name: James Blain Forshaw
- Date of birth: 30 December 1919
- Place of birth: Govan, Scotland
- Date of death: 2015 (aged 95)
- Place of death: New Kilpatrick, Scotland
- Position: Forward

Senior career*
Years	Team	Apps	(Gls)
1946–1947	Dumbarton	4	(0)
- * Club domestic league appearances and goals

James Blain Forshaw (30 December 1919 – 2015) was a Scottish footballer who played for Dumbarton.

Forshaw died in New Kilpatrick in 2015, at the age of 95.

Jim was a friend of mine. He also played for Glasgow Rangers just before WW2 until he was called up. He was shot in the leg while in action. When he returned to Glasgow he ended up playing for Dumbarton. Due to the leg injury he felt (his own words to me), "I was never good enough to play for Rangers again". Up until the time of his death he was the oldest living ex-Glasgow Rangers player. In his younger days he was very active in the Boy's Brigade and played lawn bowls in his latter years. A gem of a man.
