= Jimmy Garth =

Scottish footballer (1922–1972)

Personal information
- Full name: James Russell Garth
- Date of birth: 1 May 1922
- Place of birth: Bridgeton, Glasgow, Scotland
- Date of death: 1 June 1972 (aged 50)
- Place of death: Detroit, Michigan, U.S.
- Position: Forward

Senior career*
Years	Team	Apps	(Gls)
- Drumchapel Amateurs
1946–1947	Greenock Morton	7	(8)
1946–1948	Preston North End	23	(8)
1948–1949	Clyde	32	(7)
1949–1950	Raith Rovers	10	(2)
1950–1953	Greenock Morton	30	(4)
- Inverness Caledonian
- * Club domestic league appearances and goals

James Russell Garth (1 May 1922 – 1 June 1972) was a Scottish footballer who played for Drumchapel Amateurs, Greenock Morton, Preston North End, Clyde, Raith Rovers and Inverness Caledonian.

Garth died in Detroit, Michigan on 1 June 1972, at the age of 50.
