= Ronald Aitken =

Scottish footballer (1920–1987)

Personal information
- Full name: Ronald Morrison Aitken
- Date of birth: 7 May 1920
- Place of birth: Edinburgh, Scotland
- Date of death: 12 August 1987 (aged 67)
- Place of death: Leith, Scotland
- Position: Outside left

Youth career
- Croy Celtic
- Musselburgh Athletic

Senior career*
Years	Team	Apps	(Gls)
1945–1946	Hibernian		
1946–1947	Dumbarton	4	(0)
- * Club domestic league appearances and goals

Ronald Morrison Aitken (7 May 1920 – 12 August 1987) was a Scottish footballer who played for Hibernian and Dumbarton.
