= George Carson (footballer) =

Scottish footballer (1925–1989)

Personal information
- Full name: George Carson
- Date of birth: 8 March 1925
- Place of birth: Dumbarton, Scotland
- Date of death: 1989 (aged 64)
- Place of death: Dumbarton, Scotland
- Position: Forward

Youth career
- Vale of Leven

Senior career*
Years	Team	Apps	(Gls)
1948–1949	Raith Rovers	8	(1)
1949–1950	Dumbarton	5	(1)
- * Club domestic league appearances and goals

George Carson (8 March 1925 – 1989) was a Scottish footballer who played for Raith Rovers and Dumbarton.

Carson died in Dumbarton in 1989, at the age of 64.
