= Bobby Ross (footballer, born 1917) =

Scottish footballer

Personal information
- Full name: Robert Ross
- Date of birth: 2 February 1917
- Place of birth: Glasgow, Scotland
- Date of death: 21 August 1994 (aged 77)
- Place of death: Sutton, England
- Position: Wing half

Senior career*
Years	Team	Apps	(Gls)
1946–1947	Watford	33	(6)
1947–1948	Dumbarton	26	(1)
- * Club domestic league appearances and goals

Robert Ross (2 February 1917 – 21 August 1994) was a Scottish footballer who played for Watford and Dumbarton.
