= 1949–50 Scottish Football League =

Scottish football season

Statistics of the Scottish Football League in season 1949–50.

== Scottish League Division A ==
Pos	Team	Pld	W	D	L	GF	GA	GD	Pts
1	Rangers	30	22	6	2	58	26	+32	50
2	Hibernian	30	22	5	3	86	34	+52	49
3	Hearts	30	20	3	7	86	40	+46	43
4	East Fife	30	15	7	8	58	43	+15	37
5	Celtic	30	14	7	9	51	50	+1	35
6	Dundee	30	12	7	11	49	46	+3	31
7	Partick Thistle	30	13	3	14	55	45	+10	29
8	Aberdeen	30	11	4	15	48	56	−8	26
9	Raith Rovers	30	9	8	13	45	54	−9	26
10	Motherwell	30	10	5	15	53	58	−5	25
11	St Mirren	30	8	9	13	42	49	−7	25
12	Third Lanark	30	11	3	16	44	62	−18	25
13	Clyde	30	10	4	16	56	73	−17	24
14	Falkirk	30	7	10	13	48	72	−24	24
15	Queen of the South	30	5	6	19	31	63	−32	16
16	Stirling Albion	30	6	3	21	38	77	−39	15

Source: RSSSF

== Scottish League Division B ==
Pos	Team	Pld	W	D	L	GF	GA	GD	Pts	Promotion or relegation
1	Morton	30	20	7	3	77	33	+44	47	Promotion to the 1950–51 Division A
2	Airdrieonians	30	19	6	5	79	40	+39	44	Promotion to the 1950–51 Division A
3	Dunfermline Athletic	30	16	4	10	71	57	+14	36	
4	St Johnstone	30	15	6	9	64	56	+8	36	
5	Cowdenbeath	30	16	3	11	63	56	+7	35	
6	Hamilton Academical	30	14	6	10	57	44	+13	34	
7	Dundee United	30	14	5	11	74	56	+18	33	
8	Kilmarnock	30	14	5	11	50	43	+7	33	
9	Queen's Park	30	12	7	11	63	59	+4	31	
10	Forfar Athletic	30	11	8	11	53	56	−3	30	
11	Albion Rovers	30	10	7	13	49	61	−12	27	
12	Stenhousemuir	30	8	8	14	54	72	−18	24	
13	Ayr United	30	8	6	16	53	80	−27	22	
14	Arbroath	30	5	9	16	47	69	−22	19	
15	Dumbarton	30	6	4	20	39	62	−23	16	
16	Alloa Athletic	30	5	3	22	47	96	−49	13	

Source: "1949-1950 Division B - SPFL Archive". SPFL.

== Scottish League Division C South East ==
Pos	Team	Pld	W	D	L	GF	GA	GR	Pts	Promotion or relegation
1	Hibernian II	30	25	4	1	125	32	3.906	54	
2	Heart of Midlothian II	30	19	7	4	91	34	2.676	45	
3	St. Johnstone II	30	16	6	8	69	55	1.255	38	
4	Aberdeen II	30	12	11	7	66	48	1.375	35	
5	Dundee II	30	13	9	8	75	63	1.190	35	
6	Brechin City	30	14	4	12	71	53	1.340	32	
7	Arbroath II	30	10	12	8	76	82	0.927	32	Left the League
8	East Fife II	30	12	7	11	68	61	1.115	31	
9	Montrose	30	12	5	13	60	62	0.968	29	
10	Dundee United II	30	9	8	13	58	64	0.906	26	
11	Raith Rovers II	30	12	2	16	69	79	0.873	26	
12	East Stirlingshire	30	9	8	13	51	62	0.823	26	Transferred to South West
13	Leith Athletic	30	8	8	14	55	73	0.753	24	
14	Dunfermline Athletic II	30	8	3	19	55	108	0.509	19	
15	Stirling Albion II	30	4	7	19	58	106	0.547	15	Left the League
16	Alloa Athletic II	30	6	1	23	45	110	0.409	13	

Source: rsssf

== Scottish League Division C South West ==
Pos	Team	Pld	W	D	L	GF	GA	GR	Pts	Promotion or relegation
1	Clyde II	34	25	6	3	115	43	2.674	56	
2	Rangers II	34	25	4	5	82	30	2.733	54	
3	St Mirren II	34	19	6	9	68	56	1.214	44	
4	Falkirk II	34	17	6	11	78	59	1.322	40	Transferred to North East
5	Motherwell II	34	18	3	13	91	65	1.400	39	
6	Third Lanark II	34	16	6	12	68	55	1.236	38	
7	Partick Thistle II	34	16	5	13	76	69	1.101	37	
8	Stranraer	34	15	5	14	80	71	1.127	35	
9	Ayr United II	34	15	2	17	63	63	1.000	32	
10	Greenock Morton II	34	14	4	16	69	75	0.920	32	
11	Queen's Park II	34	11	7	16	54	61	0.885	29	
12	Airdrieonians II	34	11	6	17	66	93	0.710	28	
13	Queen of the South II	34	13	2	19	51	80	0.638	28	
14	Celtic II	34	11	5	18	60	70	0.857	27	Transferred to North East
15	Kilmarnock II	34	11	5	18	52	74	0.703	27	
16	Albion Rovers II	34	9	8	17	51	74	0.689	26	Left the League
17	Hamilton Academical II	34	8	4	22	55	84	0.655	20	
18	Dumbarton II	34	6	8	20	47	104	0.452	20	

Source: rsssf

== See also ==
- 1949–50 in Scottish football
