= 1943–44 Southern League Cup (Scotland) =

Scottish football tournament

The 1943–44 Southern League Cup was the fourth edition of the regional war-time football tournament.

== Group stage ==
=== Group A ===
Team	Pld	W	D	L	GF	GA	GD	Pts
Rangers	6	5	0	1	14	5	+9	10
Motherwell	6	3	1	2	11	12	−1	7
Heart of Midlothian	6	3	0	3	13	11	+2	6
Airdrieonians	6	0	1	5	6	16	−10	1

=== Group B ===
Team	Pld	W	D	L	GF	GA	GD	Pts
Celtic	6	6	0	0	24	2	+22	12
Partick Thistle	6	3	0	3	9	14	-5	6
Falkirk	6	1	1	4	8	12	−4	3
Hamilton Academical	6	1	1	4	8	21	−13	3

=== Group C ===
Team	Pld	W	D	L	GF	GA	GD	Pts
Hibernian	6	5	1	0	20	6	+14	11
Morton	6	3	2	1	19	13	+6	8
Albion Rovers	6	1	2	3	11	15	−3	4
Third Lanark	6	0	1	5	5	21	−16	1

=== Group D ===
Team	Pld	W	D	L	GF	GA	GD	Pts
Clyde	6	3	2	1	12	4	+8	8
Dumbarton	6	3	1	2	9	10	−1	7
Queen's Park	6	2	1	3	7	12	−5	5
St Mirren	6	1	2	3	8	10	−2	4

== Semi-finals ==
Rangers	4 – 2	Celtic	Hampden Park, Glasgow
Hibernian	5 – 2	Clyde	Hampden Park, Glasgow

== Final ==
20 May 1944

Hibernian	0–0 (6–5 on corners)	Rangers

Hampden Park, Glasgow
Attendance: 63,000

=== Teams ===
Hibernian:
GK	Mitchell Downie
RB	Robert Fraser
LB	Alex Hall
RH	Willie Finnigan
CH	Bobby Baxter
LH	Sammy Kean
OR	Gordon Smith
IR	Tommy Bogan
CF	James Nelson
IL	Jimmy Woodburn
OL	Jimmy Caskie

Rangers:
GK	Jerry Dawson (substituted off) 18'
RB	Dougie Gray
LB	Jock Shaw
RH	Adam Little
CH	George Young
LH	Scot Symon
OR	Willie Waddell
IR	Torry Gillick
CF	Jimmy Smith
IL	Jimmy Duncanson
OL	Charlie Johnston
