= Joe Henderson (footballer, born 1924) =

Scottish footballer

Personal information
- Full name: Joseph Henderson
- Date of birth: 21 December 1924
- Place of birth: Cleland, Scotland
- Date of death: 15 February 1984 (aged 59)
- Place of death: Cleland, Scotland
- Position: Goalkeeper

Senior career*
Years	Team	Apps	(Gls)
1944–1946	Hibernian	0	(0)
1945–1946	→ Dumbarton (loan)	0	(0)
1946–1949	Albion Rovers	60	(0)
1949–1952	Northampton Town	0	(0)
1952–1953	Stenhousemuir	31	(0)
1953–1954	Accrington Stanley	14	(0)
1954–1956	Canterbury City		
1956–1957	Stranraer	2	(0)
Total		107	(0)
- * Club domestic league appearances and goals

Joseph Henderson (21 December 1924 – 15 February 1984) was a Scottish professional footballer who played as a goalkeeper in the Football League.
