= 1943–44 Southern Football League (Scotland) =

The 1943–44 Southern Football League was the fourth edition of the regional war-time football league tournament.

== Table ==
Pos	Team	Pld	W	D	L	GF	GA	GD	Pts
1	Rangers (C)	30	23	4	3	90	27	+63	50
2	Celtic	30	18	7	5	71	43	+28	43
3	Hibernian	30	17	4	9	72	54	+18	38
4	Heart of Midlothian	30	14	7	9	67	50	+17	35
5	Dumbarton	30	13	6	11	54	58	−4	32
6	Motherwell	30	12	8	10	69	53	+16	32
7	Clyde	30	13	5	12	62	58	+4	31
8	Morton	32	12	8	12	63	61	+2	32
9	Hamilton Academical	30	13	3	14	80	88	−8	29
10	Partick Thistle	30	11	5	14	62	66	−4	27
11	Queen's Park	30	10	6	14	64	75	−11	26
12	Falkirk	30	10	5	15	79	80	−1	25
13	St Mirren	30	9	7	14	58	78	−20	25
14	Airdrieonians	30	9	5	16	54	72	−18	23
15	Albion Rovers	30	7	3	20	43	85	−42	17
16	Third Lanark	30	7	3	20	60	100	−40	17

Source: The Celtic Wiki – Southern Football League
Rules for classification: 1) points; 2) goal difference; 3) number of goals scored.
(C) Champions
