= 1946–47 Scottish Football League =

Scottish football season

Statistics of the Scottish Football League in season 1946–47.

== Scottish League Division A ==
Pos	Team	Pld	W	D	L	GF	GA	GD	Pts
1	Rangers	30	21	4	5	76	26	+50	46
2	Hibernian	30	19	6	5	69	33	+36	44
3	Aberdeen	30	16	7	7	58	41	+17	39
4	Hearts	30	16	6	8	52	43	+9	38
5	Partick Thistle	30	16	3	11	74	59	+15	35
6	Morton	30	12	10	8	58	45	+13	34
7	Celtic	30	13	6	11	53	55	−2	32
8	Motherwell	30	12	5	13	58	54	+4	29
9	Third Lanark	30	11	6	13	56	64	−8	28
10	Clyde	30	9	9	12	55	65	−10	27
11	Falkirk	30	8	10	12	62	61	+1	26
12	Queen of the South	30	9	8	13	44	69	−25	26
13	Queen's Park	30	8	6	16	47	60	−13	22
14	St Mirren	30	9	4	17	47	65	−18	22
15	Kilmarnock	30	6	9	15	44	66	−22	21
16	Hamilton Academical	30	2	7	21	38	85	−47	11

Source: RSSSF

== Scottish League Division B ==
Pos	Team	Pld	W	D	L	GF	GA	GD	Pts	Promotion or relegation
1	Dundee	26	21	3	2	113	30	+83	45	Promotion to 1947–48 Division A
2	Airdrieonians	26	19	4	3	78	38	+40	42	Promotion to 1947–48 Division A
3	East Fife	26	12	7	7	58	39	+19	31	
4	Albion Rovers	26	10	7	9	50	54	−4	27	
5	Alloa Athletic	26	11	5	10	51	57	−6	27	
6	Raith Rovers	26	10	6	10	45	52	−7	26	
7	Stenhousemuir	26	8	7	11	43	53	−10	23	
8	Dunfermline Athletic	26	10	3	13	50	72	−22	23	
9	St Johnstone	26	9	4	13	45	47	−2	22	
10	Dundee United	26	9	4	13	53	60	−7	22	
11	Ayr United	26	9	2	15	56	73	−17	20	
12	Arbroath	26	7	6	13	42	63	−21	20	
13	Dumbarton	26	7	4	15	41	54	−13	18	
14	Cowdenbeath	26	6	6	14	44	77	−33	18	

== Scottish League Division C ==
Pos	Team	Pld	W	D	L	GF	GA	GD	Pts	Promotion or relegation
1	Stirling Albion	18	13	4	1	76	66	+10	30	Promotion to the 1947–48 Division B
2	Dundee 'A' (Note: 'A' teams were not eligible for promotion from Division C.)	18	12	2	4	60	37	+23	26	
3	Leith Athletic	18	11	3	4	57	33	+24	25	Promotion to the 1947–48 Division B
4	East Stirlingshire	18	10	2	6	54	40	+14	22	
5	St Johnstone 'A'	18	8	5	5	52	37	+15	21	
6	Forfar Athletic	18	6	2	10	32	46	−14	14	
7	Montrose	18	5	2	11	39	53	−14	12	
8	Brechin City	18	4	4	10	42	60	−18	12	
9	Dundee United 'A'	18	3	3	12	42	77	−35	9	
10	Edinburgh City	18	3	3	12	36	75	−39	9	

== See also ==
- 1946–47 in Scottish football
