= Thomas Ashe (footballer) =

Scottish footballer (1920–1997)

Personal information
- Full name: Thomas Morrison Ashe
- Date of birth: 13 July 1920
- Place of birth: Paisley, Scotland
- Date of death: 1997 (aged 76)
- Place of death: Paisley, Scotland
- Position: Inside left

Senior career*
Years	Team	Apps	(Gls)
1946–1948	Dumbarton	44	(4)
- * Club domestic league appearances and goals

Thomas Morrison Ashe (13 July 1920 – 1997) was a Scottish footballer who played for Dumbarton.
