= Hugh Goldie (footballer, born 1923) =

Scottish footballer (1923–1993)

Personal information
- Full name: Hugh Goldie
- Date of birth: 14 December 1923
- Place of birth: Shotts, Scotland
- Date of death: February 24, 1993 (aged 69)
- Place of death: Airdrie, Scotland
- Position: Forward

Youth career
- Slateford Athletic

Senior career*
Years	Team	Apps	(Gls)
1947–1950	Dumbarton	60	(24)
1949–1950	Raith Rovers	8	(2)
1950–1952	Ayr United	15	(9)
1952–1953	Albion Rovers	20	(6)
1953–1954	Dumbarton	17	(4)
- * Club domestic league appearances and goals

Hugh Goldie (14 December 1923 – 24 February 1993) was a Scottish footballer who played for Dumbarton, Raith Rovers, Ayr United and Albion Rovers.
