= Jack McNee (1950s footballer) =

Scottish footballer

Personal information
- Position: Left back

Youth career
- Carluke Rovers

Senior career*
Years	Team	Apps	(Gls)
1947–1954	Dumbarton	148	(3)
- * Club domestic league appearances and goals

Jack McNee was a Scottish football player during the 1940s and 1950s. He started his career with junior side Carluke Rovers before signing for Dumbarton where he was a constant in the defence for seven seasons.
