= Lawrie Lindsay =

Scottish footballer

Lawrance Lindsay
Personal information
- Full name: Lawrance Lindsay
- Date of birth: 7 October 1921
- Place of birth: Dumbarton, Scotland
- Date of death: 5 February 1985 (aged 63)
- Place of death: Alexandria, Scotland
- Position: Centre half

Youth career
- Vale of Leven

Senior career*
Years	Team	Apps	(Gls)
1946–1947	Dumbarton	16	(0)
1947–1948	Dundee	0	(0)
1948–1950	Crewe	40	(0)
- * Club domestic league appearances and goals

Lawrance Lindsay (7 October 1921 – 5 February 1985) was a Scottish footballer who played for Dumbarton, Crewe and Dundee.
