= 1946–47 Scottish Division A =

41st season of top-tier football league in Scotland

Scottish Division A
- Season: 1946–47
- Champions: Rangers
- Relegated: Kilmarnock; Hamilton Academical

The 1946–47 Scottish Division A was the first season of competitive football in Scotland after World War II. It was won by Rangers by two points over nearest rival Hibernian. Kilmarnock and Hamilton Academical finished 15th and 16th respectively and were relegated to the 1947–48 Scottish Division B.

== League table ==
Pos	Team	Pld	W	D	L	GF	GA	GD	Pts
1	Rangers	30	21	4	5	76	26	+50	46
2	Hibernian	30	19	6	5	69	33	+36	44
3	Aberdeen	30	16	7	7	58	41	+17	39
4	Hearts	30	16	6	8	52	43	+9	38
5	Partick Thistle	30	16	3	11	74	59	+15	35
6	Morton	30	12	10	8	58	45	+13	34
7	Celtic	30	13	6	11	53	55	−2	32
8	Motherwell	30	12	5	13	58	54	+4	29
9	Third Lanark	30	11	6	13	56	64	−8	28
10	Clyde	30	9	9	12	55	65	−10	27
11	Falkirk	30	8	10	12	62	61	+1	26
12	Queen of the South	30	9	8	13	44	69	−25	26
13	Queen's Park	30	8	6	16	47	60	−13	22
14	St Mirren	30	9	4	17	47	65	−18	22
15	Kilmarnock	30	6	9	15	44	66	−22	21
16	Hamilton Academical	30	2	7	21	38	85	−47	11

Source: RSSSF

== Results ==
Home \ Away	ABE	CEL	CLY	FAL	HAM	HOM	HIB	KIL	MOR	MOT	PAR	QOS	QPA	RAN	STM	THI
Aberdeen		6–2	2–1	0–4	3–0	2–1	2–1	1–0	2–2	3–1	2–2	0–0	3–1	1–0	4–2	1–0
Celtic	1–5		3–3	0–0	2–1	2–3	4–1	4–2	1–2	3–2	2–0	2–0	1–0	2–3	2–1	1–4
Clyde	0–2	2–2		4–0	2–1	0–2	2–2	3–3	2–1	3–1	2–4	1–1	2–5	2–4	2–2	0–3
Falkirk	2–0	1–4	1–2		6–0	3–3	2–3	3–3	1–1	5–2	6–1	2–3	3–1	0–5	2–3	2–2
Hamilton Academical	2–5	2–2	1–2	1–4		3–1	0–0	2–2	2–2	2–2	1–3	2–3	1–2	0–6	1–4	2–2
Heart of Midlothian	4–0	2–1	2–1	1–1	4–3		2–3	2–0	2–0	2–1	1–4	1–1	1–3	0–3	2–2	4–1
Hibernian	1–1	2–0	1–0	2–2	3–2	0–1		6–0	1–1	1–2	5–1	9–1	3–1	1–1	1–0	4–1
Kilmarnock	2–1	1–2	2–2	2–1	1–1	0–0	3–5		2–3	2–0	3–1	1–3	2–2	0–2	1–5	0–2
Morton	0–0	2–1	2–2	3–3	5–1	0–1	0–2	0–0		3–1	3–4	4–1	5–4	0–1	4–0	2–0
Motherwell	2–2	1–2	3–3	2–0	4–0	0–2	2–1	2–1	0–1		3–3	5–1	1–0	2–4	4–2	2–1
Partick Thistle	4–0	4–1	1–3	4–1	4–1	1–2	0–2	5–2	3–1	0–2		1–2	4–0	3–2	3–0	3–1
Queen of the South	1–5	3–1	2–0	2–2	2–3	0–1	1–3	1–1	2–2	1–6	0–0		1–4	0–2	3–2	4–1
Queen's Park	0–0	1–3	1–3	0–1	2–1	2–2	0–1	0–1	2–3	1–1	2–6	4–1		0–0	3–2	0–0
Rangers	1–0	1–1	5–0	2–1	4–1	1–2	1–2	3–2	2–1	2–1	4–0	2–1	2–0		4–0	8–1
St Mirren	4–2	0–1	1–3	1–1	1–0	1–0	0–1	3–1	1–1	1–2	1–4	1–2	3–2	1–0		2–4
Third Lanark	0–3	0–0	5–3	4–2	2–1	4–1	0–2	1–4	1–4	2–1	4–1	1–1	3–4	1–1	5–1	

Legend: Blue = home team win; Yellow = draw; Red = away team win.
