= Ian Cook (footballer) =

Scottish footballer

Personal information
- Full name: Ian Kerr Cook
- Date of birth: 26 August 1924
- Date of death: 12 October 1989 (aged 65)
- Place of death: Edinburgh, Scotland
- Position: Outside right

Youth career
- Arthurlie

Senior career*
Years	Team	Apps	(Gls)
1947–1949	Morton	2	(0)
1949–1950	Dumbarton (loan)	4	(1)
- * Club domestic league appearances and goals

Ian Kerr Cook (26 August 1924 – 12 October 1989) was a Scottish footballer who played for Morton and Dumbarton. Cook was born on 28 August 1924. He married Jessie Paterson, and worked as a joiner following his retirement from professional football. He died from heart failure in Edinburgh on 12 October 1989, at the age of 65.
