= Jackie Cantwell =

Scottish footballer (1923–1989)

Personal information
- Full name: John Cantwell
- Date of birth: 21 November 1923
- Place of birth: Glenboig, Scotland
- Date of death: 1989 (aged 65)
- Place of death: Airdrie, Scotland
- Position: Centre forward

Youth career
- Glenboig St Josephs

Senior career*
Years	Team	Apps	(Gls)
1946–1947	Celtic	8	(5)
1947–1950	Dumbarton	53	(14)
1950–1951	Morton	12	(2)
1951–1952	Stenhousemuir	2	(0)
- * Club domestic league appearances and goals

John Cantwell (21 November 1923 – 1989) was a Scottish footballer who played for Celtic, Dumbarton, Morton and Stenhousemuir.
