= 1947–48 Scottish Football League =

Scottish football season

Statistics of the Scottish Football League in season 1947–48.

== Scottish League Division A ==
Pos	Team	Pld	W	D	L	GF	GA	GD	Pts
1	Hibernian	30	22	4	4	85	26	+59	48
2	Rangers	30	21	4	5	92	20	+72	46
3	Partick Thistle	30	16	4	10	61	42	+19	36
4	Dundee	30	15	3	12	67	51	+16	33
5	St Mirren	30	13	5	12	54	58	−4	31
6	Clyde	30	12	7	11	52	57	−5	31
7	Falkirk	30	10	10	10	55	48	+7	30
8	Motherwell	30	13	3	14	45	47	−2	29
9	Heart of Midlothian	30	10	8	12	37	42	−5	28
10	Aberdeen	30	10	7	13	45	45	0	27
11	Third Lanark	30	10	6	14	56	73	−17	26
12	Celtic	30	10	5	15	41	56	−15	25
13	Queen of the South	30	10	5	15	49	74	−25	25
14	Morton	30	9	6	15	47	43	+4	24
15	Airdrieonians	30	7	7	16	40	78	−38	21
16	Queens Park	30	9	2	19	45	75	−30	20

Source: SPFL

== Scottish League Division B ==
Pos	Team	Pld	W	D	L	GF	GA	GD	Pts	Promotion or relegation
1	East Fife	30	25	3	2	103	36	+67	53	Promotion to the 1948–49 Division A
2	Albion Rovers	30	19	4	7	58	49	+9	42	Promotion to the 1948–49 Division A
3	Hamilton Academical	30	17	6	7	75	45	+30	40	
4	Raith Rovers	30	14	6	10	83	66	+17	34	
5	Cowdenbeath	30	12	8	10	56	53	+3	32	
6	Kilmarnock	30	13	4	13	72	62	+10	30	
7	Dunfermline Athletic	30	13	3	14	72	71	+1	29	
8	Stirling Albion	30	11	6	13	65	66	−1	28	
9	St Johnstone	30	11	5	14	69	63	+6	27	
10	Ayr United	30	9	9	12	59	61	−2	27	
11	Alloa Athletic	30	10	6	14	56	77	−21	26	
12	Dumbarton	30	9	7	14	66	79	−13	25	
13	Arbroath	30	10	3	17	55	62	−7	23	
14	Stenhousemuir	30	6	11	13	53	83	−30	23	
15	Dundee United	30	10	2	18	58	88	−30	22	
16	Leith Athletic	30	6	7	17	45	84	−39	19	Relegated to the 1948–49 Division C

Source: "1947-1948 Division B - SPFL Archive". SPFL.

== Scottish League Division C ==
Pos	Team	Pld	W	D	L	GF	GA	GD	Pts	Promotion or relegation
1	East Stirlingshire	22	18	3	1	72	26	+46	39	Promotion to the 1948–49 Division B
2	East Fife 'A'	22	16	3	3	63	37	+26	35	
3	Forfar Athletic	22	14	4	4	67	37	+30	32	
4	Kilmarnock 'A'	22	10	3	9	52	41	+11	23	
5	St Johnstone 'A'	22	9	4	9	44	51	−7	22	
6	Dundee United 'A'	22	9	2	11	55	57	−2	20	
7	Montrose	22	7	5	10	42	69	−27	19	
8	Arbroath 'A'	22	7	4	11	45	57	−12	18	
9	Leith Athletic 'A'	22	7	3	12	44	60	−16	17	
10	Brechin City	22	6	4	12	43	54	−11	16	
11	Edinburgh City	22	6	3	13	51	58	−7	15	
12	Raith Rovers 'A'	22	3	2	17	36	67	−31	8	

== See also ==
- 1947–48 in Scottish football
