= 1946–47 Scottish League Cup =

Tournament details
- Country: Scotland

Final positions
- Champions: Rangers
- Runners-up: Aberdeen

The 1946–47 Scottish League Cup was the inaugural staging of Scotland's second most prestigious football knockout competition. The competition was won by Rangers, who defeated Aberdeen 4–0 in the Final.

The tournament became an annual competition in the Scottish football calendar with the return of regular football following the Second World War. The previous season, the unofficial 1945–46 Southern League Cup had been contested by teams across the country and proved popular; the final (also between Aberdeen and Rangers) attracted a crowd of crowd of 135,000 at Hampden Park). It was thus continued on those lines on an official basis from then on.

== First round ==
=== Section 1 ===
| Team | Pld | W | D | L | GF | GA | GR | Pts |
|---|---|---|---|---|---|---|---|---|
| Heart of Midlothian (1) | 6 | 3 | 2 | 1 | 12 | 10 | 1.200 | 8 |
| Clyde (1) | 6 | 3 | 1 | 2 | 12 | 10 | 1.200 | 7 |
| Kilmarnock (1) | 6 | 3 | 0 | 3 | 12 | 11 | 1.091 | 6 |
| Partick Thistle (1) | 6 | 0 | 3 | 3 | 11 | 16 | 0.688 | 3 |

21 September 1946

| Clyde | 1–2 | Heart of Midlothian |

21 September 1946

| Kilmarnock | 3–2 | Partick Thistle |

28 September 1946

| Heart of Midlothian | 3–1 | Kilmarnock |

28 September 1946

| Partick Thistle | 2–2 | Clyde |

5 October 1946

| Clyde | 3–2 | Kilmarnock |

5 October 1946

| Partick Thistle | 4–4 | Heart of Midlothian |

12 October 1946

| Heart of Midlothian | 2–1 | Clyde |

12 October 1946

| Partick Thistle | 1–3 | Kilmarnock |

19 October 1946

| Clyde | 3–1 | Partick Thistle |

19 October 1946

| Kilmarnock | 2–0 | Heart of Midlothian |

26 October 1946

| Heart of Midlothian | 1–1 | Partick Thistle |

26 October 1946

| Kilmarnock | 1–2 | Clyde |

=== Section 2 ===
| Team | Pld | W | D | L | GF | GA | GR | Pts |
|---|---|---|---|---|---|---|---|---|
| Rangers (1) | 6 | 6 | 0 | 0 | 18 | 2 | 9.000 | 12 |
| Morton (1) | 6 | 4 | 0 | 2 | 17 | 9 | 1.889 | 8 |
| St Mirren (1) | 6 | 1 | 1 | 4 | 7 | 19 | 0.368 | 3 |
| Queen's Park (1) | 6 | 0 | 1 | 5 | 5 | 17 | 0.294 | 1 |

21 September 1946

| Morton | 2–1 | Queen's Park |

21 September 1946

| Rangers | 4–0 | St Mirren |

28 September 1946

| Queen's Park | 2–4 | Rangers |

28 September 1946

| St Mirren | 2–3 | Morton |

5 October 1946

| Queen's Park | 2–2 | St Mirren |

5 October 1946

| Rangers | 3–0 | Morton |

12 October 1946

| Queen's Park | 0–6 | Morton |

12 October 1946

| St Mirren | 0–4 | Rangers |

19 October 1946

| Morton | 6–1 | St Mirren |

19 October 1946

| Rangers | 1–0 | Queen's Park |

26 October 1946

| Morton | 0–2 | Rangers |

26 October 1946

| St Mirren | 2–0 | Queen's Park |

=== Section 3 ===
| Team | Pld | W | D | L | GF | GA | GR | Pts |
|---|---|---|---|---|---|---|---|---|
| Hibernian (1) | 6 | 4 | 1 | 1 | 16 | 9 | 1.778 | 9 |
| Celtic (1) | 6 | 2 | 3 | 1 | 11 | 10 | 1.100 | 7 |
| Hamilton Academical (1) | 6 | 2 | 1 | 3 | 14 | 16 | 0.875 | 5 |
| Third Lanark (1) | 6 | 1 | 1 | 4 | 8 | 14 | 0.571 | 3 |

21 September 1946

| Hibernian | 4–2 | Celtic |

21 September 1946

| Third Lanark | 3–5 | Hamilton Academical |

28 September 1946

| Celtic | 0–0 | Third Lanark |

28 September 1946

| Hamilton Academical | 3–6 | Hibernian |

5 October 1946

| Hamilton Academical | 2–2 | Celtic |

5 October 1946

| Hibernian | 1–2 | Third Lanark |

12 October 1946

| Celtic | 1–1 | Hibernian |

12 October 1946

| Hamilton Academical | 3–0 | Third Lanark |

19 October 1946

| Hibernian | 2–0 | Hamilton Academical |

19 October 1946

| Third Lanark | 2–3 | Celtic |

26 October 1946

| Celtic | 3–1 | Hamilton Academical |

26 October 1946

| Third Lanark | 1–2 | Hibernian |

=== Section 4 ===
| Team | Pld | W | D | L | GF | GA | GR | Pts |
|---|---|---|---|---|---|---|---|---|
| Aberdeen (1) | 6 | 4 | 0 | 2 | 13 | 11 | 1.182 | 8 |
| Motherwell (1) | 6 | 3 | 1 | 2 | 15 | 11 | 1.364 | 7 |
| Falkirk (1) | 6 | 2 | 1 | 3 | 11 | 12 | 0.917 | 5 |
| Queen of the South (1) | 6 | 2 | 0 | 4 | 8 | 13 | 0.615 | 4 |

21 September 1946

| Aberdeen | 4–3 | Falkirk |

21 September 1946

| Motherwell | 0–1 | Queen of the South |

28 September 1946

| Falkirk | 1–1 | Motherwell |

28 September 1946

| Queen of the South | 2–5 | Aberdeen |

5 October 1946

| Aberdeen | 2–3 | Motherwell |

5 October 1946

| Queen of the South | 0–2 | Falkirk |

12 October 1946

| Falkirk | 0–1 | Aberdeen |

12 October 1946

| Queen of the South | 4–3 | Motherwell |

19 October 1946

| Aberdeen | 1–0 | Queen of the South |

19 October 1946

| Motherwell | 5–3 | Falkirk |

26 October 1946

| Falkirk | 2–1 | Queen of the South |

26 October 1946

| Motherwell | 3–0 | Aberdeen |

=== Section 5 ===
| Team | Pld | W | D | L | GF | GA | GR | Pts |
|---|---|---|---|---|---|---|---|---|
| East Fife (2) | 6 | 6 | 0 | 0 | 22 | 0 | — | 12 |
| St Johnstone (2) | 6 | 2 | 1 | 3 | 9 | 10 | 0.900 | 5 |
| Dunfermline Athletic (2) | 6 | 2 | 0 | 4 | 9 | 20 | 0.450 | 4 |
| Alloa Athletic (2) | 6 | 1 | 1 | 4 | 3 | 13 | 0.231 | 3 |

21 September 1946

| Alloa Athletic | 0–0 | St Johnstone |

21 September 1946

| Dunfermline Athletic | 0–2 | East Fife |

28 September 1946

| East Fife | 6–0 | Alloa Athletic |

28 September 1946

| St Johnstone | 6–2 | Dunfermline Athletic |

5 October 1946

| Dunfermline Athletic | 3–1 | Alloa Athletic |

5 October 1946

| St Johnstone | 0–2 | East Fife |

12 October 1946

| East Fife | 7–0 | Dunfermline Athletic |

12 October 1946

| St Johnstone | 1–0 | Alloa Athletic |

19 October 1946

| Alloa Athletic | 0–2 | East Fife |

19 October 1946

| Dunfermline Athletic | 3–2 | St Johnstone |

26 October 1946

| Alloa Athletic | 2–1 | Dunfermline Athletic |

26 October 1946

| East Fife | 3–0 | St Johnstone |

=== Section 6 ===
| Team | Pld | W | D | L | GF | GA | GR | Pts |
|---|---|---|---|---|---|---|---|---|
| Dundee (2) | 4 | 4 | 0 | 0 | 13 | 0 | — | 8 |
| Stenhousemuir (2) | 4 | 1 | 0 | 3 | 5 | 12 | 0.417 | 2 |
| Raith Rovers (2) | 4 | 1 | 0 | 3 | 4 | 10 | 0.400 | 2 |

21 September 1946

| Raith Rovers | 0–2 | Dundee |

28 September 1946

| Dundee | 4–0 | Stenhousemuir |

5 October 1946

| Stenhousemuir | 1–2 | Raith Rovers |

12 October 1946

| Dundee | 3–0 | Raith Rovers |

19 October 1946

| Stenhousemuir | 0–4 | Dundee |

26 October 1946

| Raith Rovers | 2–4 | Stenhousemuir |

=== Section 7 ===
| Team | Pld | W | D | L | GF | GA | GR | Pts |
|---|---|---|---|---|---|---|---|---|
| Dundee United (2) | 6 | 5 | 0 | 1 | 13 | 7 | 1.857 | 10 |
| Cowdenbeath (2) | 6 | 3 | 1 | 2 | 18 | 11 | 1.636 | 7 |
| Dumbarton (2) | 6 | 2 | 0 | 4 | 13 | 15 | 0.867 | 4 |
| Arbroath (2) | 6 | 1 | 1 | 4 | 11 | 22 | 0.500 | 3 |

21 September 1946

| Arbroath | 4–1 | Dumbarton |

21 September 1946

| Dundee United | 2–0 | Cowdenbeath |

28 September 1946

| Cowdenbeath | 5–2 | Arbroath |

28 September 1946

| Dumbarton | 0–3 | Dundee United |

5 October 1946

| Arbroath | 1–3 | Dundee United |

5 October 1946

| Dumbarton | 0–4 | Cowdenbeath |

12 October 1946

| Cowdenbeath | 4–1 | Dundee United |

12 October 1946

| Dumbarton | 8–0 | Arbroath |

19 October 1946

| Arbroath | 3–3 | Cowdenbeath |

19 October 1946

| Dundee United | 2–1 | Dumbarton |

26 October 1946

| Cowdenbeath | 2–3 | Dumbarton |

26 October 1946

| Dundee United | 2–1 | Arbroath |

=== Section 8 ===
| Team | Pld | W | D | L | GF | GA | GR | Pts |
|---|---|---|---|---|---|---|---|---|
| Airdrieonians (2) | 4 | 3 | 0 | 1 | 15 | 4 | 3.750 | 6 |
| Ayr United (2) | 4 | 2 | 0 | 2 | 10 | 12 | 0.833 | 4 |
| Albion Rovers (2) | 4 | 1 | 0 | 3 | 10 | 19 | 0.526 | 2 |

21 September 1946

| Albion Rovers | 5–4 | Ayr United |

28 September 1946

| Airdrieonians | 6–1 | Albion Rovers |

5 October 1946

| Ayr United | 2–1 | Airdrieonians |

12 October 1946

| Ayr United | 4–3 | Albion Rovers |

19 October 1946

| Albion Rovers | 1–5 | Airdrieonians |

26 October 1946

| Airdrieonians | 3–0 | Ayr United |

== Quarter-finals ==
=== First leg ===
1 March 1947

| Airdrieonians (2) | 4–4 | Hibernian (1) |

1 March 1947

| Dundee (2) | 0–1 | Aberdeen (1) |

1 March 1947

| Heart of Midlothian (1) | 0–1 | East Fife (2) |

1 March 1947

| Rangers (1) | 2–1 | Dundee United (2) |

=== Second leg ===
5 March 1947

| Aberdeen (1) | 3–2 | Dundee (2) |

Aberdeen won 4–2 on aggregate

5 March 1947

| Dundee United (2) | 1–1 | Rangers (1) |

Rangers won 3–2 on aggregate

5 March 1947

| East Fife (2) | 2–5 | Heart of Midlothian (1) |

Heart of Midlothian won 5–3 on aggregate

5 March 1947

| Hibernian (1) | 1–0 | Airdrieonians (2) |

Hibernian won 5–4 on aggregate

== Semi-finals ==
22 March 1947

| Aberdeen (1) | 6–2 | Heart of Midlothian (1) |

22 March 1947

| Rangers (1) | 3–1 | Hibernian (1) |

Hampden Park
Attendance: 123,830

== Final ==
5 April 1947

| Rangers (1) | 4–0 | Aberdeen (1) |
|---|---|---|
| Duncanson; Gillick; Williamson |

Hampden Park, Glasgow
Attendance: 82,700
