= George Campbell (footballer, born 1920) =

Scottish footballer (born 1920)

Personal information
- Full name: George Wallace Campbell
- Date of birth: 29 January 1920
- Place of birth: Dumbarton, Scotland
- Position: Left half

Youth career
- Vale of Leven

Senior career*
Years	Team	Apps	(Gls)
1944–1948	Dumbarton	47	(2)
1947–1948	Stirling Albion	2	(2)
- * Club domestic league appearances and goals

George Wallace Campbell (born 29 January 1920) was a Scottish footballer who played for Dumbarton and Stirling Albion. He was born in Dumbarton, Scotland on 29 January 1920. As of 1966, Campbell was living in Hamilton, Ontario, Canada.
