= Ian Ogilvie =

Scottish footballer (1922–1985)

Personal information
- Full name: Ian Ogilvie
- Date of birth: 24 April 1922
- Place of birth: Forfar, Scotland
- Date of death: 1985 (aged 63)
- Place of death: Forfar, Scotland
- Position: Goalkeeper

Youth career
- Forfar Celtic

Senior career*
Years	Team	Apps	(Gls)
1945–1950	Dumbarton	22	(0)
- * Club domestic league appearances and goals

Ian Ogilvie (24 April 1922 – 1985) was a Scottish footballer who played for Dumbarton.

Ogilvie died in Forfar in 1985, at the age of 63.
