= Bobby Wallace (footballer) =

Scottish footballer

Personal information
- Full name: Robert McKenzie Wallace
- Date of birth: 1908
- Place of birth: Polmont, Scotland
- Date of death: 1991 (aged 82–83)
- Place of death: Bellshill, Scotland
- Position: Right back

Senior career*
Years	Team	Apps	(Gls)
–	Blantyre Victoria		
1934–1943	Hamilton Academical	172	(1)
1943–1947	Dumbarton	22	(0)
Total		194	(1)
- * Club domestic league appearances and goals

Robert McKenzie Wallace (1908–1991) was a Scottish footballer who played mainly as a right back and spent most of his career with Hamilton Academical. He took part in the 1935 Scottish Cup Final which Accies lost 2–1 to Rangers. He continued to play for Hamilton in unofficial competitions following the outbreak of World War II before moving on to Dumbarton in 1943. He remained at Boghead Park until 1947, registering a season of appearances in the normal competitions after the conflict was over.
