= Bobby Donaldson (footballer) =

Scottish footballer (1922–2011)

Personal information
- Full name: Robert Veitch Donaldson
- Date of birth: 20 August 1922
- Place of birth: Lasswade, Midlothian, Scotland
- Date of death: 2011 (aged 89)
- Place of death: Midlothian, Scotland
- Position: Half back

Youth career
- Bathgate

Senior career*
Years	Team	Apps	(Gls)
1943–1950	Dumbarton	111	(0)
1950–1951	Cowdenbeath	13	(0)
- * Club domestic league appearances and goals

Robert Veitch Donaldson (20 August 1922 – 2011) was a Scottish footballer who played for Dumbarton and Cowdenbeath.

Donaldson died in Midlothian in 2011, at the age of 89.
