= 1948–49 Dumbarton F.C. season =

Dumbarton
1948–1949 season
- Manager: William Guthrie
- Stadium: Boghead Park, Dumbarton
- Scottish League B Division: 15th
- Scottish Cup: Third Round
- Scottish League Cup: Prelims
- B Division Supplementary Cup: First Round
- Top goalscorer: League: Hugh Goldie (12); All: Hugh Goldie (17)
Home colours

The 1948–49 season was the 65th Scottish football season in which Dumbarton competed at national level, entering the Scottish Football League, the Scottish Cup, the Scottish League Cup and the Supplementary Cup. In addition Dumbarton competed in the Stirlingshire Cup.

== Scottish Football League ==
By mid November, Dumbarton were challenging the leaders of the B Division, but a disastrous spell, which saw only one victory from 17 games, meant that hopes faded and Dumbarton eventually finished 15th out of 16 with 22 points - 20 behind champions Raith Rovers.

14 August 1948 Division B	Dumbarton	3–2	Dundee United	Boghead Park
	Bootland 11', 48'; Grant 41'		McKay 34', 60'	Attendance: 5,000; Referee: C E Faultless

18 August 1948 Division B	Ayr United	3–2	Dumbarton	Somerset Park
	Beattie 3'; Morrison 14'; Wallace 25'		Lynch 29'; Crichton 61'	Attendance: 8,500; Referee: J Mowatt

21 August 1948 Division B	Dumbarton	5–2	Queen's Park	Boghead Park
	Bootland 8'; Crichton 49'; Grant 53'; Goldie 63'; Lynch 73'		Cunningham 21'; McAulay 40'	Attendance: 2,500; Referee: J J Lynch

28 August 1948 Division B	Stenhousemuir	5–0	Dumbarton	Ochilview
	Smith 25', 40', 75'; Miller, G 57', 80'			Attendance: 3,000; Referee: T Shirley

1 September 1948 Division B	Dumbarton	1–1	Arbroath	Boghead Park
	Goldie 11'		Herron 60'	Attendance: 3,000; Referee: A Smellie

4 September 1948 Division B	Cowdenbeath	1–2	Dumbarton	Central Park, Cowdenbeath
	Jones 66'		Donegan 25'; Grant 62'	Attendance: 4,000; Referee: D Alexander

23 October 1948 Division B	Raith Rovers	4–3	Dumbarton	Starks Park
	Penman 3', 65', 83'; Maule 82'		Donegan 16'; Grant 23'; Bootland 46' (pen.)	Attendance: 7,000; Referee: J J Lynch

30 October 1948 Division B	Dumbarton	2–2	East Stirling	Boghead Park
	Bootland 55' (pen.); Stirling 63'		Campbell 12'; McMillan 72'	Attendance: 2,500; Referee: W Davidson

6 November 1948 Division B	East Stirling	2–3	Dumbarton	Firs Park
	Dalgleish 7'; Wardlaw 59'		Goldie 35'; Stirling 42'; Bootland 50'	Attendance: 2,000; Referee: J B Smellie

13 November 1948 Division B	Dumbarton	5–3	Hamilton	Boghead Park
	Bootland 5'; Stirling 37', 63', 86'; Goldie 71'		Mooney 13'; Devlin 16'; Martin 67'	Attendance: 3,000; Referee: J Jackson

20 November 1948 Division B	Dumbarton	3–3	Dunfermline Athletic	Boghead Park
	Bootland; Stirling; Goldie		Noble; Kinnear (pen.); Cannon	Referee: J Boyd

27 November 1948 Division B	Kilmarnock	4–2	Dumbarton	Rugby Park
	McLaren 5', 76'; Smith 48'; Clive 62'		Grant 30', 51'	Attendance: 7,000; Referee: G McDonald

4 December 1948 Division B	Dumbarton	0–4	Airdrie	Boghead Park
			McMillan 44'; Brown, W 50'; Seawright 54'; Parlane 57'	Attendance: 4,000; Referee: J Kerr

11 December 1948 Division B	Dumbarton	1–5	Stirling Albion	Boghead Park
	Grant 29'		Dick 6', 80'; Stirling, A 9'; Szpula 37'; Whiteford 77' (pen.)	Attendance: 2,500; Referee: R G Benzie

18 December 1948 Division B	St Johnstone	3–1	Dumbarton	Muirton Park
	Irving 13'; Buckley 17'; McRoberts 24'		Stirling 47'	Attendance: 6,000; Referee: W G Livingston

25 December 1948 Division B	Dumbarton	0–0	Ayr United	Boghead Park
				Attendance: 3,000; Referee: W Davidson

1 January 1949 Division B	Queen's Park	2–0	Dumbarton	Hampden Park
	McAulay 70'; Cunningham 85'			Attendance: 5,000; Referee: A Young

3 January 1949 Division B	Dumbarton	2–2	Stenhousemuir	Boghead Park
	Speirs 85'		Garvie 6'; Bow	Attendance: 2,000; Referee: C E Faultless

8 January 1949 Division B	Dundee United	4–0	Dumbarton	Tannadice Park
	McKay 14', 41', 89'; Mitchell 40'			Attendance: 8,000; Referee: P Fitzpatrick

15 January 1949 Division B	Dumbarton	1–3	Cowdenbeath	Boghead Park
	Stirling 87'		Boyd 54', 61'; Brawley 83'	Referee: G Mitchell

29 January 1949 Division B	Arbroath	3–0	Dumbarton	Gayfield Park
	Quinn 55'; McEwan 69'; Ross 87'			Attendance: 3,000; Referee: C E Faultless

12 February 1949 Division B	Alloa Athletic	2–4	Dumbarton	Recreation Park, Alloa
	Kesley 60'; Willox 62'		Goldie 16', 32', 46'; McLean 68'	Attendance: 4,000; Referee: J J Lynch

26 February 1949 Division B	Hamilton	4–0	Dumbarton	Douglas Park
	Cupples 53', 60'; McMullen 72'; Rothera 76' (pen.)			Attendance: 2,500; Referee: J A Mowatt

5 March 1949 Division B	Dunfermline Athletic	3–2	Dumbarton	East End Park
	Henderson 21' 81'; Keith 60'		Speirs 41' 57'	Referee: C Faultless

12 March 1949 Division B	Dumbarton	2–2	Kilmarnock	Boghead Park
	Goldie 40'; Lambie 53' (o.g.)		McLaren 11'; Hunter 20'	Attendance: 2,500; Referee: J Jackson

19 March 1949 Division B	Airdrie	3–1	Dumbarton	Broomfield Park
	Seawright 31', 88'; Bannan 77'		Stirling 47'	Attendance: 6,000; Referee: J B Cox

26 March 1949 Division B	Stirling Albion	3–1	Dumbarton	Annfield Stadium
	Martin 13'; Szpula 31'		Goldie	Attendance: 6,000; Referee: W Webb

2 April 1949 Division B	Dumbarton	1–0	St Johnstone	Boghead Park
	Cantwell 8' (pen.)			Attendance: 1,000; Referee: W Davidson

9 April 1949 Division B	Dumbarton	0–1	Raith Rovers	Boghead Park
			Collins 57'	Referee: J Jackson

16 April 1949 Division B	Dumbarton	5–3	Alloa Athletic	Boghead Park
	Cantwell 6' (pen.) 25'; Speirs 12'; McLean 36'; Goldie 49'		Rowan 18'; Gilhooley 50'; Crothers 67'	Referee: W Davidson

== Supplementary Cup ==
Dumbarton's interest in the B Division Supplementary Cup was short lived with a first round exit to Cowdenbeath.

25 August 1948 Round 1	Cowdenbeath	4–2	Dumbarton	Central Park, Cowdenbeath
	Cowan 1'; McCreadie 2'; McKay 30'		Lynch 15'; Crichton 72'	Attendance: 3,000; Referee: A Ward

== League Cup ==
Progress from their League Cup section was again to prove too much of a challenge for Dumbarton, finishing 4th and last, with just a draw being taken from their 6 games.

11 September 1948 Section 8	Airdrie	8–1	Dumbarton	Broomfield Park
	Duncan 5'; Orr 15', 24', 33', 42'; Parlane 45'; McMillan 60'; Brown 72'		Bootland 68' (pen.)	Attendance: 7,500; Referee: J R Boyd

18 September 1948 Section 8	Dumbarton	1–2	Ayr United	Boghead Park
	Goldie 29'		Morrison 7'; Beattie 42'	Attendance: 3,000; Referee: W Webb

25 September 1948 Section 8	Arbroath	4–2	Dumbarton	Gayfield Park
	Quinn 14'; Lang 27'; Ross 67', 80'		C. McNee 63'; Goldie 70'	Attendance: 4,000; Referee: J Kerr

2 October 1948 Section 8	Dumbarton	0–5	Airdrie	Boghead Park
			Duncan 3', 40'; Parlane 34', 80'; Seawright 73'	Attendance: 3,000; Referee: R G Benzie

9 October 1948 Section 8	Ayr United	2–1	Dumbarton	Somerset Park
	Beattie 63'; McGuigan 82'		Bootland 19'	Attendance: 6,000; Referee: R J Smith

16 October 1948 Section 8	Dumbarton	1–1	Arbroath	Boghead Park
	Cantwell 72'		Coy 17'	Attendance: 3,000; Referee: W Davidson

== Scottish Cup ==
Dumbarton brought some cheer to their fans with some success in the Scottish Cup before losing out in the third round to A Division opponents Hearts.

22 January 1949 Round 1	Dumbarton	5–2	Kilmarnock	Boghead Park
	Goldie 33', 55', 80'; Stirling 42'; McLean 87'		McLaren 35'; Hunter 83'	Attendance: 10,000; Referee: W G Livingstone

5 February 1949 Round 2	Dumbarton	1–1	Dundee United	Boghead Park
	Hepburn 62'		Mitchell 14'	Attendance: 9,000; Referee: J Jackson

9 February 1949 Round 2 Replay	Dundee United	1–3	Dumbarton	Tannadice Park
	McKay 40'		McLean 7'; Grant 22'; Stirling 44'	Attendance: 10,000; Referee: J Jackson

19 February 1949 Round 3	Hearts	3–0	Dumbarton	Tynecastle Stadium
	Crum 27'; Dixon 51'; Flavell 76'			Attendance: 30,241; Referee: J R Boyd

== Stirlingshire Cup ==
Dumbarton won a thrilling first round tie against A Division Falkirk in the 'county' cup but due to other teams' commitments the competition was never completed.

21 August 1948 Round 1	Dumbarton	7–1	Falkirk	Boghead Park
	Donegan; Goldie; Speirs; Cantwell		Dawson	Referee: G McDonald

== Player statistics ==
No.	Pos	Nat	Player	Total		B Division		Scottish Cup		League Cup		Supplementary Cup	
No.	Pos	Nat	Player	Apps	Goals	Apps	Goals	Apps	Goals	Apps	Goals	Apps	Goals
	GK	(Scotland) SCO	Jim Jamieson	8	0	6	0	0	0	2	0	0	0
	GK	(Scotland) SCO	George Paton	31	0	22	0	4	0	4	0	1	0
	GK	(Scotland) SCO	Ormond Tyrell	1	0	1	0	0	0	0	0	0	0
	GK	(Scotland) SCO	Trialist	2	0	2	0	0	0	0	0	0	0
	DF	(Scotland) SCO	George Ferguson	31	0	22	0	4	0	5	0	0	0
	DF	(Scotland) SCO	Jack McNee	37	0	26	0	4	0	6	0	1	0
	MF	(Scotland) SCO	Bobby Donaldson	32	0	25	0	4	0	2	0	1	0
	MF	(Scotland) SCO	John Fulton	9	0	6	0	0	0	3	0	0	0
	MF	(Scotland) SCO	Ian Hepburn	26	1	20	0	4	1	2	0	0	0
	MF	(Scotland) SCO	Matt Lynch	33	3	24	2	4	0	4	0	1	1
	MF	(Scotland) SCO	Gordon McFarlane	7	0	4	0	0	0	3	0	0	0
	MF	(Scotland) SCO	Alex Menzies	13	0	8	0	0	0	4	0	1	0
	FW	(Scotland) SCO	Charlie Bootland	18	10	11	8	0	0	6	2	1	0
	FW	(Scotland) SCO	Jackie Cantwell	16	4	12	3	0	0	4	1	0	0
	FW	(Scotland) SCO	Johnny Crichton	7	3	4	2	0	0	2	1	1	0
	FW	(Scotland) SCO	Tom Donegan	40	2	29	2	4	0	6	0	1	0
	FW	(Scotland) SCO	Hugh Goldie	38	17	28	12	4	3	5	2	1	0
	FW	(Scotland) SCO	Peter Grant	39	7	28	6	4	1	6	0	1	0
	FW	(Scotland) SCO	Archie McIndewar	7	0	7	0	0	0	0	0	0	0
	FW	(Scotland) SCO	Neil McLean	14	4	10	2	4	2	0	0	0	0
	FW	(Scotland) SCO	Chris McNee	11	1	8	0	0	0	2	1	1	0
	FW	(Scotland) SCO	Joe Speirs	7	5	7	5	0	0	0	0	0	0
	FW	(Scotland) SCO	Bob Stirling	23	11	19	9	4	2	0	0	0	0
	FW	(Scotland) SCO	Willie Walmsley	1	0	1	0	0	0	0	0	0	0

=== Transfers ===
==== Players in ====
Player	From	Date
(Scotland) George Paton	(Scotland) Hearts	12 May 1948
(Scotland) Johnny Crichton	(Scotland) Queen's Park	15 Jun 1948
(Scotland) John Fulton	(Scotland) Queen of the South	29 Jun 1948
(Scotland) Peter Grant	(Scotland) Rangers	29 Jun 1948
(Scotland) Chris McNee	(Scotland) Rangers	2 Jul 1948
(Scotland) Matt Lynch	(Scotland) Celtic	8 Aug 1948
(Scotland) Joe Speirs	(Scotland) Glenryan Thistle	23 Aug 1948
(Scotland) George Ferguson	(Scotland) Celtic	31 Aug 1948
(Scotland) Jim Jamieson	(Scotland) Jamestown Athletic	4 Oct 1948
(Scotland) Bob Stirling	(Scotland) Third Lanark	20 Oct 1948
(Scotland) Archie McIndewar	(Scotland) Rangers	3 Dec 1948

==== Players out ====
Player	To	Date
(Scotland) Jimmy Mulvaney	(England) Luton Town	29 May 1948
(Scotland) Charlie Bootland	(Scotland) Clyde	27 Nov 1948
(Scotland) Alex Menzies	(Scotland) Cowdenbeath	10 Dec 1948
(Scotland) Johnny Crichton	(Scotland) Airdrie	23 Feb 1949
(Scotland) John Fulton	(Scotland) Released	10 Mar 1949
(Scotland) Matt Lynch	(Scotland) Freed	30 Apr 1949
(Scotland) Archie McIndewar	(Scotland) Freed	30 Apr 1949
(Scotland) Chris McNee	(Scotland) Freed	30 Apr 1949

== Reserve team ==
Dumbarton played only one competitive 'reserve' fixture by entering the Scottish Second XI Cup where they lost in the first round to Partick Thistle.
