= 1948–49 in Scottish football =

Association football season

Division A champions
- Rangers

Division B champions
- Raith Rovers

Division C champions
- Forfar Athletic

Scottish Cup winners
- Rangers

League Cup winners
- Rangers

Division C Supplementary League (A) winners
- Brechin City

Division C Supplementary League (B) winners
- Leith Athletic

Junior Cup winners
- Auchinleck Talbot

Scotland national team
- 1949 BHC

The 1948–49 season was the 76th season of competitive football in Scotland and the 52nd season of the Scottish Football League. Rangers became the first team to win the Scottish domestic treble. At the end of the season, Scottish Division C was split into two regional sections. It would be 26 years before a set-up with three national divisions would be in place again.

== Scottish League Division A ==
Pos	Team	Pld	W	D	L	GF	GA	GD	Pts
1	Rangers	30	20	6	4	63	32	+31	46
2	Dundee	30	20	5	5	71	48	+23	45
3	Hibernian	30	17	5	8	75	52	+23	39
4	East Fife	30	16	3	11	64	46	+18	35
5	Falkirk	30	12	8	10	70	54	+16	32
6	Celtic	30	12	7	11	48	40	+8	31
7	Third Lanark	30	13	5	12	56	52	+4	31
8	Heart of Midlothian	30	12	6	12	64	54	+10	30
9	St Mirren	30	13	4	13	51	47	+4	30
10	Queen of the South	30	11	8	11	47	53	−6	30
11	Partick Thistle	30	9	9	12	50	63	−13	27
12	Motherwell	30	10	5	15	44	49	−5	25
13	Aberdeen	30	7	11	12	39	48	−9	25
14	Clyde	30	9	6	15	50	67	−17	24
15	Morton	30	7	8	15	39	51	−12	22
16	Albion Rovers	30	3	2	25	30	105	−75	8

Source: RSSSF

Champions: Rangers
Relegated: Greenock Morton, Albion Rovers

== Scottish League Division B ==
Pos	Team	Pld	W	D	L	GF	GA	GD	Pts	Promotion or relegation
1	Raith Rovers	30	20	2	8	80	44	+36	42	Promotion to the 1949–50 Division A
2	Stirling Albion	30	20	2	8	71	47	+24	42	Promotion to the 1949–50 Division A
3	Airdrieonians	30	16	9	5	76	42	+34	41	
4	Dunfermline Athletic	30	16	9	5	80	58	+22	41	
5	Queen's Park	30	14	7	9	66	49	+17	35	
6	St Johnstone	30	14	4	12	58	51	+7	32	
7	Arbroath	30	12	8	10	62	56	+6	32	
8	Dundee United	30	10	7	13	60	67	−7	27	
9	Ayr United	30	10	7	13	51	70	−19	27	
10	Hamilton Academical	30	9	8	13	48	57	−9	26	
11	Kilmarnock	30	9	7	14	58	61	−3	25	
12	Stenhousemuir	30	8	8	14	50	54	−4	24	
13	Cowdenbeath	30	9	5	16	53	58	−5	23	
14	Alloa Athletic	30	10	3	17	42	85	−43	23	
15	Dumbarton	30	8	6	16	52	79	−27	22	
16	East Stirlingshire	30	6	6	18	38	67	−29	18	Relegated to the 1949–50 Division C

Source: "1948-1949 Division B - SPFL Archive". SPFL.

Champions: Raith Rovers, Stirling Albion
Relegated: East Stirlingshire

== Scottish League Division C ==
Pos	Team	Pld	W	D	L	GF	GA	GD	Pts	Promotion or relegation
1	Forfar Athletic	22	17	1	4	80	37	+43	35	Promotion to the 1949–50 Division B
2	Leith Athletic	22	15	3	4	76	29	+47	33	
3	Brechin City	22	13	4	5	67	40	+27	30	
4	Montrose	22	10	5	7	59	50	+9	25	
5	Queen's Park II	22	9	6	7	52	52	0	24	
6	Airdrieonians II	22	9	4	9	66	66	0	22	
7	St. Johnstone II	22	9	4	9	42	44	−2	22	
8	Dundee United II	22	10	2	10	58	67	−9	22	
9	Raith Rovers II	22	6	7	9	56	60	−4	19	
10	Kilmarnock II	22	5	3	14	41	54	−13	13	
11	Dunfermline Athletic II	22	4	3	15	43	84	−41	11	
12	Edinburgh City	22	2	4	16	28	85	−57	8	

Source: RSSSF

== Cup honours ==
Competition	Winner	Score	Runner-up
Scottish Cup 1948–49	Rangers	4 – 1	Clyde
League Cup 1948–49	Rangers	2 – 0	Raith Rovers
Junior Cup	Auchinleck Talbot	3 – 2	Petershill

== Other Honours ==
=== National ===
Competition	Winner	Score	Runner-up
B Division Supplementary Cup	St Johnstone	4 – 1 *	Raith Rovers
Scottish Qualifying Cup - North	Inverness Caledonian	3 – 0	Clachnacuddin
Scottish Qualifying Cup - South	Leith Athletic	5 – 2	Brechin City

=== County ===
Competition	Winner	Score	Runner-up
Aberdeenshire Cup	Peterhead	5 – 4 *	Deveronvale
East of Scotland Shield	Hibernian	2 – 1	Hearts
Forfarshire Cup	Dundee	2 – 1 †	Arbroath
Glasgow Cup	Celtic	3 – 1	Third Lanark
Lanarkshire Cup	Albion Rovers	2 – 1	Airdrie
Renfrewshire Cup	Morton	3 – 1	St Mirren
Southern Counties Cup	Newton Stewart		

- * - aggregate over two legs
- † - replay

=== Highland League ===
Top Three
Pos	Team	Pld	W	D	L	GF	GA	GD	Pts
1	Peterhead	30	24	3	3	120	35	+85	51
2	Clachnacuddin	30	20	3	7	80	39	+41	43
3	Elgin City	30	20	3	7	101	55	+46	43

== Scotland national team ==
Date	Venue	Opponents	Score	Competition	Scotland scorer(s)
23 October 1948	Ninian Park, Cardiff (A)	Wales	3–1	BHC	Willie Waddell (2), Lawrie Reilly
17 November 1948	Hampden Park, Glasgow (H)	Northern Ireland	3–2	BHC	Billy Houliston (2), Jimmy Mason
9 April 1949	Wembley Stadium, London (A)	England	3–1	BHC	Jimmy Mason, Billy Steel, Lawrie Reilly
27 April 1949	Hampden Park, Glasgow (H)	France	2–0	Friendly	Billy Steel (2)

Scotland were winners of the 1949 British Home Championship.

Key:

- (H) = Home match
- (A) = Away match
- BHC = British Home Championship
