= Arthur Dixon (footballer, born 1921) =

English footballer

Personal information
- Full name: Arthur Dixon
- Date of birth: 17 November 1921
- Place of birth: Middleton, England
- Date of death: 3 May 2006 (aged 84)
- Place of death: Glasgow, Scotland
- Position: Inside forward

Senior career*
Years	Team	Apps	(Gls)
1940–1945	Queen's Park	0	(0)
1945–1947	Clyde	30	(12)
1947–1949	Heart of Midlothian	34	(5)
1949–1951	Northampton Town	68	(21)
1951–1953	Leicester City	11	(0)
- Kettering Town
- * Club domestic league appearances and goals

Arthur Dixon (17 November 1921 – 3 May 2006) was an English professional footballer who played in the Football League for Northampton Town and Leicester City as an inside forward. He also played in the Scottish League for Heart of Midlothian and Clyde. After his retirement from football, Dixon worked as a masseur and physiotherapist for Notts County.

== Personal life ==
Dixon was the son of footballer Arthur Dixon.

== Career statistics ==
Appearances and goals by club, season and competition
Club	Season	League			National Cup		League Cup		Other		Total	
Club	Season	Division	Apps	Goals	Apps	Goals	Apps	Goals	Apps	Goals	Apps	Goals
Heart of Midlothian	1947–48	Scottish First Division	25	3	2	0	0	0	1 (Note: Appearance in East of Scotland Shield)	0	28	3
Heart of Midlothian	1948–49	Scottish First Division	9	2	4	3	4	2	0	0	17	7
Heart of Midlothian	1949–50	Scottish First Division	0	0	―		1	0	0	0	1	0
Heart of Midlothian	Total		34	5	6	3	5	2	1	0	46	10
Leicester City	1951–52	Second Division	8	0	0	0	―		―		8	0
Leicester City	1952–53	Second Division	3	0	0	0	―		―		3	0
Leicester City	Total		11	0	0	0	―		―		11	0
Career total			45	5	6	3	5	2	1	0	57	10

== Honours ==
Heart of Midlothian

- East of Scotland Shield: 1947–48
