= 1948–49 Celtic F.C. season =

Celtic
1948–49 season
- Manager: Jimmy McGrory
- Stadium: Celtic Park
- Scottish Division A: 6th
- Scottish Cup: First round
- Scottish League Cup: Group stage

During the 1948–49 Scottish football season, Celtic competed in Scottish Division A.

== Competitions ==
=== Scottish Division A ===
==== League table ====
Pos	Team	Pld	W	D	L	GF	GA	GD	Pts
4	East Fife	30	16	3	11	64	46	+18	35
5	Falkirk	30	12	8	10	70	54	+16	32
6	Celtic	30	12	7	11	48	40	+8	31
7	Third Lanark	30	13	5	12	56	52	+4	31
8	Heart of Midlothian	30	12	6	12	64	54	+10	30

Source: RSSSF

==== Matches ====
14 August 1948 Division A	Celtic	0–0	Morton	Glasgow
				Stadium: Celtic Park; Attendance: 55,070

18 August 1948 Division A	Aberdeen	1–0	Celtic	Aberdeen
				Stadium: Pittodrie Park; Attendance: 35,000

21 August 1948 Division A	Celtic	0–1	Rangers	Glasgow
				Stadium: Celtic Park; Attendance: 50,000

28 August 1948 Division A	Heart of Midlothian	1–2	Celtic	Edinburgh
				Stadium: Tynecastle Park; Attendance: 41,175

1 September 1948 Division A	Celtic	2–2	Queen of the South	Glasgow
				Stadium: Celtic Park; Attendance: 40,000

4 September 1948 Division A	Albion Rovers	3–3	Celtic	Coatbridge
15:00 GMT				Stadium: Cliftonhill; Attendance: 25,000

23 October 1948 Division A	Celtic	0–1	Dundee	Glasgow
				Stadium: Celtic Park; Attendance: 25,000

30 October 1948 Division A	Hibernian	1–2	Celtic	Edinburgh
				Stadium: Easter Road; Attendance: 32,000

6 November 1948 Division A	Clyde	0–4	Celtic	Glasgow
				Stadium: Shawfield Stadium; Attendance: 30,000

13 November 1948 Division A	Celtic	0–1	East Fife	Glasgow
				Stadium: Celtic Park; Attendance: 45,000

20 November 1948 Division A	Third Lanark	3–2	Celtic	Glasgow
				Stadium: Cathkin Park; Attendance: 20,000

27 November 1948 Division A	Celtic	4–4	Falkirk	Glasgow
				Stadium: Celtic Park; Attendance: 50,000

4 December 1948 Division A	Partick Thistle	1–2	Celtic	Glasgow
				Stadium: Firhill Park; Attendance: 33,000

11 December 1948 Division A	St Mirren	1–1	Celtic	Paisley
				Stadium: St Mirren Park, Love Street; Attendance: 34,000

18 December 1948 Division A	Celtic	3–2	Motherwell	Glasgow
				Stadium: Celtic Park; Attendance: 45,000

25 December 1948 Division A	Celtic	3–0	Aberdeen	Glasgow
				Stadium: Celtic Park; Attendance: 35,000

1 January 1949 Division A	Rangers	4–0	Celtic	Glasgow
				Stadium: Ibrox Park; Attendance: 95,000

3 January 1949 Division A	Celtic	2–0	Hearts	Glasgow
				Stadium: Celtic Park; Attendance: 49,500

8 January 1949 Division A	Morton	0–0	Celtic	Greenock
				Stadium: Cappielow Park; Attendance: 15,000

15 January 1949 Division A	Celtic	3–0	Albion Rovers	Glasgow
				Stadium: Celtic Park; Attendance: 15,000

29 January 1949 Division A	Queen of the South	1–0	Celtic	Dumfries
				Stadium: Palmerston Park; Attendance: 16,500

12 February 1949 Division A	Celtic	1–2	Hibernian	Glasgow
				Stadium: Celtic Park; Attendance: 40,000

26 February 1949 Division A	East Fife	3–2	Celtic	Methil
				Stadium: Bayview Park; Attendance: 18,360

12 March 1949 Division A	Falkirk	1–1	Celtic	Falkirk
				Stadium: Brockville Park; Attendance: 16,000

19 March 1949 Division A	Celtic	3–0	Partick Thistle	Glasgow
				Stadium: Celtic Park; Attendance: 25,000

26 March 1949 Division A	Celtic	2–1	St Mirren	Glasgow
				Stadium: Celtic Park; Attendance: 28,000

2 April 1949 Division A	Motherwell	0–1	Celtic	Motherwell
				Stadium: Fir Park; Attendance: 20,000

11 April 1949 Division A	Dundee	3–2	Celtic	Dundee
				Stadium: Dens Park; Attendance: 29,000

16 April 1949 Division A	Celtic	1–2	Third Lanark	Glasgow
15:00 BST				Stadium: Celtic Park; Attendance: 30,000

18 April 1949 Division A	Celtic	2–1	Clyde	Glasgow
				Stadium: Celtic Park; Attendance: 25,000

=== Scottish Cup ===
22 January 1949 First round	Dundee United	4–3	Celtic	Dundee
				Stadium: Tannadice Park; Attendance: 25,000

=== Scottish League Cup ===
11 September 1948 Group 8	Celtic	1–0	Hibernian	Glasgow
				Stadium: Celtic Park; Attendance: 55,000

18 September 1948 Group 8	Clyde	0–2	Celtic	Glasgow
				Stadium: Shawfield Stadium; Attendance: 26,000

25 September 1948 Group 8	Celtic	3–1	Rangers	Glasgow
				Stadium: Celtic Park; Attendance: 65,000

2 October 1948 Group 8	Hibernian	4–2	Celtic	Edinburgh
				Stadium: Easter Road; Attendance: 53,000

9 October 1948 Group 8	Celtic	3–6	Clyde	Glasgow
				Stadium: Celtic Park; Attendance: 22,000

16 October 1948 Group 8	Rangers	2–1	Celtic	Glasgow
				Stadium: Ibrox Park; Attendance: 105,000
