= 1948–49 Heart of Midlothian F.C. season =

Heart of Midlothian
1948–49 season
- Manager: David McLean
- Stadium: Tynecastle Park
- Scottish First Division: 6th
- Scottish Cup: Round 3
- League Cup: Group Stage

During the 1948–49 season Hearts competed in the Scottish First Division, the Scottish Cup, the Scottish League Cup and the East of Scotland Shield.

== Fixtures ==
=== Friendlies ===
2 September 1948 Benefit Match	Haddington Athletic	0–1	Hearts	Millfield Park
	Goal

26 March 1949 Friendly	Middlesbrough	4–0	Hearts	Ayresome Park
	Goal

27 April 1949 Friendly	Hearts	1–1	Chelsea	Tynecastle Park
	Goal

2 May 1949 Friendly	Hearts	1–1	Queen's Park	Tynecastle Park
	Goal

7 May 1949 Friendly	Hearts	7–0	Scottish Command	Tynecastle Park
	Goal

=== East of Scotland Shield (1) ===
11 April 1949 Final	Hearts	0–3	Hibernian	Tynecastle Park

=== East of Scotland Shield (2) ===
18 April 1948 Semi-Final	Hearts	6–0	Edinburgh City	Tynecastle Park

=== Penman Cup ===
25 August 1948 Final	Hearts	1–2	Raith Rovers	Tynecastle Park

=== League Cup ===
11 September 1948 League Cup Group	Hearts	2–2	Partick Thistle	Tynecastle Park
				Attendance: 23,668

18 September 1948 League Cup Group	East Fife	4–0	Hearts	Bayview Park
				Attendance: 12,000

25 September 1948 League Cup Group	Queen of the South	2–3	Hearts	Palmerston Park
				Attendance: 11,500

2 October 1948 League Cup Group	Partick Thistle	3–1	Hearts	Firhill Park
				Attendance: 29,000

9 October 1948 League Cup Group	Hearts	6–1	East Fife	Tynecastle Park
				Attendance: 24,374

16 October 1948 League Cup Group	Hearts	4–0	Queen of the South	Tynecastle Park
				Attendance: 26,757

=== Scottish Cup ===
22 January 1949 Scottish Cup R1	Hearts	4–1	Airdrieonians	Tynecastle Park
				Attendance: 29,388

5 February 1949 Scottish Cup R2	Hearts	3–1	Third Lanark	Tynecastle Park
				Attendance: 31,596

19 February 1949 Scottish Cup R3	Hearts	3–0	Dumbarton	Tynecastle Park
				Attendance: 30,241

5 March 1949 Scottish Cup R3	Hearts	2–4	Dundee	Tynecastle Park
				Attendance: 37,356

=== Scottish First Division ===
14 August 1948 Scottish First Division	Dundee	2–1	Hearts	Dens Park
				Attendance: 30,000

18 August 1948 Scottish First Division	Hearts	3–2	Third Lanark	Tynecastle Park
				Attendance: 23,731

21 August 1948 Scottish First Division	Hibernian	3–1	Hearts	Easter Road
				Attendance: 40,000

28 August 1948 Scottish First Division	Hearts	1–2	Celtic	Tynecastle Park
				Attendance: 41,175

1 September 1948 Scottish First Division	Motherwell	3–0	Hearts	Fir Park
				Attendance: 15,000

4 September 1948 Scottish First Division	Hearts	1–3	St Mirren	Tynecastle Park
				Attendance: 22,609

23 October 1948 Scottish First Division	Hearts	2–0	Rangers	Tynecastle Park
				Attendance: 40,824

30 October 1948 Scottish First Division	Clyde	3–3	Hearts	Shawfield Stadium
				Attendance: 14,000

6 November 1948 Scottish First Division	Hearts	1–3	Partick Thistle	Tynecastle Park
				Attendance: 26,079

13 November 1948 Scottish First Division	Falkirk	5–3	Hearts	Brockville Park
				Attendance: 14,000

20 November 1948 Scottish First Division	Hearts	1–1	Queen of the South	Tynecastle Park
				Attendance: 18,966

27 November 1948 Scottish First Division	Morton	0–2	Hearts	Cappielow Park
				Attendance: 12,000

4 December 1948 Scottish First Division	Aberdeen	2–2	Hearts	Pittodrie Park
				Attendance: 20,000

11 December 1948 Scottish First Division	Hearts	4–0	East Fife	Tynecastle Park
				Attendance: 27,769

18 December 1948 Scottish First Division	Albion Rovers	1–5	Hearts	Cliftonhill
				Attendance: 10,000

25 December 1948 Scottish First Division	Third Lanark	1–1	Hearts	Cathkin Park
				Attendance: 31,500

1 January 1949 Scottish First Division	Hearts	3–2	Hibernian	Tynecastle Park
				Attendance: 45,030

3 January 1949 Scottish First Division	Celtic	2–0	Hearts	Celtic Park
				Attendance: 49,500

8 January 1949 Scottish First Division	Hearts	0–1	Dundee	Tynecastle Park
				Attendance: 39,389

15 January 1949 Scottish First Division	St Mirren	1–2	Hearts	St Mirren Park, Love Street
				Attendance: 12,000

29 January 1949 Scottish First Division	Hearts	5–1	Motherwell	Tynecastle Park
				Attendance: 32,362

12 February 1949 Scottish First Division	Hearts	3–0	Clyde	Tynecastle Park
				Attendance: 27,977

26 February 1949 Scottish First Division	Hearts	3–1	Falkirk	Tynecastle Park
				Attendance: 21,472

12 March 1949 Scottish First Division	Hearts	2–4	Morton	Tynecastle Park
				Attendance: 21,905

19 March 1949 Scottish First Division	Hearts	1–1	Aberdeen	Tynecastle Park
				Attendance: 20,926

2 April 1949 Scottish First Division	Hearts	7–1	Albion Rovers	Tynecastle Park
				Attendance: 10,002

5 April 1949 Scottish First Division	Rangers	2–1	Hearts	Ibrox Park
				Attendance: 45,000

20 April 1949 Scottish First Division	Partick Thistle	1–1	Hearts	Firhill Park
				Attendance: 30,000

23 April 1949 Scottish First Division	Queen of the South	1–4	Hearts	Palmerston Park
				Attendance: 8,500

29 April 1949 Scottish First Division	East Fife	5–1	Hearts	Bayview Park
				Attendance: 7,000

== See also ==
- List of Heart of Midlothian F.C. seasons
