= Charles Scott =

Charles or Charlie Scott may refer to:

== Politicians ==
- Charles Scott (Kentucky politician) (1739–1813), American Revolutionary War soldier and governor of Kentucky
- Charles L. Scott (1827–1899), U.S. representative from California
- Charles Frederick Scott (1860–1938), U.S. representative from Kansas
- Charles Scott (Wyoming politician) (born 1945), Republican member of the Wyoming Senate

== Sportspeople ==
- Charles Scott (lacrosse) (1883–1954), British lacrosse player
- Charles Scott (footballer) (1885–1916), Scottish footballer
- Charlie Scott (basketball) (born 1948), basketball player
- Charles Scott (American football) (born 1986), running back
- Charlie Scott (footballer) (born 1997), English footballer
- Charlie Scott (cricketer) (born 1999), English cricketer
- Charles Scott (rugby union) (1877–1965, English international rugby union player
- Chuck Scott (born 1963), American football player

== Other people ==
- Charles Rochfort Scott (c. 1790–1872), British general
- Charles Scott (ambassador) (1838–1924), British ambassador to Russia
- C. P. Scott (Charles Prestwich Scott, 1846–1932), British journalist, publisher and politician
- Charles F. Scott (engineer) (1864–1944), American electrical engineer
- Charles Kennedy Scott (1876–1965), English organist and choral conductor
- Charles L. Scott (U.S. Army general) (1883–1954), United States Army officer, commander of U.S. 2nd Armored Division
- Charles Hepburn Scott (1886–1964), Scottish-born Canadian artist
- Charles Scott (bishop) (1898–1927), Anglican missionary bishop
- C. W. A. Scott (Charles William Anderson Scott, 1903–1946), pioneer aviator
- Charles R. Scott (1905–1983), U.S. federal judge
- Charles E. Scott (born 1935), American philosopher
- Charles Marriott Oldrid Scott (1880–1952), English architect
