= 1948–49 Scottish Football League =

Scottish football season

Statistics of the Scottish Football League in season 1948–49.

== Scottish League Division A ==
Pos	Team	Pld	W	D	L	GF	GA	GD	Pts
1	Rangers	30	20	6	4	63	32	+31	46
2	Dundee	30	20	5	5	71	48	+23	45
3	Hibernian	30	17	5	8	75	52	+23	39
4	East Fife	30	16	3	11	64	46	+18	35
5	Falkirk	30	12	8	10	70	54	+16	32
6	Celtic	30	12	7	11	48	40	+8	31
7	Third Lanark	30	13	5	12	56	52	+4	31
8	Heart of Midlothian	30	12	6	12	64	54	+10	30
9	St Mirren	30	13	4	13	51	47	+4	30
10	Queen of the South	30	11	8	11	47	53	−6	30
11	Partick Thistle	30	9	9	12	50	63	−13	27
12	Motherwell	30	10	5	15	44	49	−5	25
13	Aberdeen	30	7	11	12	39	48	−9	25
14	Clyde	30	9	6	15	50	67	−17	24
15	Morton	30	7	8	15	39	51	−12	22
16	Albion Rovers	30	3	2	25	30	105	−75	8

Source: RSSSF

== Scottish League Division B ==
Pos	Team	Pld	W	D	L	GF	GA	GD	Pts	Promotion or relegation
1	Raith Rovers	30	20	2	8	80	44	+36	42	Promotion to the 1949–50 Division A
2	Stirling Albion	30	20	2	8	71	47	+24	42	Promotion to the 1949–50 Division A
3	Airdrieonians	30	16	9	5	76	42	+34	41	
4	Dunfermline Athletic	30	16	9	5	80	58	+22	41	
5	Queen's Park	30	14	7	9	66	49	+17	35	
6	St Johnstone	30	14	4	12	58	51	+7	32	
7	Arbroath	30	12	8	10	62	56	+6	32	
8	Dundee United	30	10	7	13	60	67	−7	27	
9	Ayr United	30	10	7	13	51	70	−19	27	
10	Hamilton Academical	30	9	8	13	48	57	−9	26	
11	Kilmarnock	30	9	7	14	58	61	−3	25	
12	Stenhousemuir	30	8	8	14	50	54	−4	24	
13	Cowdenbeath	30	9	5	16	53	58	−5	23	
14	Alloa Athletic	30	10	3	17	42	85	−43	23	
15	Dumbarton	30	8	6	16	52	79	−27	22	
16	East Stirlingshire	30	6	6	18	38	67	−29	18	Relegated to the 1949–50 Division C

Source: "1948-1949 Division B - SPFL Archive". SPFL.

== Scottish League Division C ==
Pos	Team	Pld	W	D	L	GF	GA	GD	Pts	Promotion or relegation
1	Forfar Athletic	22	17	1	4	80	37	+43	35	Promotion to the 1949–50 Division B
2	Leith Athletic	22	15	3	4	76	29	+47	33	
3	Brechin City	22	13	4	5	67	40	+27	30	
4	Montrose	22	10	5	7	59	50	+9	25	
5	Queen's Park II	22	9	6	7	52	52	0	24	
6	Airdrieonians II	22	9	4	9	66	66	0	22	
7	St. Johnstone II	22	9	4	9	42	44	−2	22	
8	Dundee United II	22	10	2	10	58	67	−9	22	
9	Raith Rovers II	22	6	7	9	56	60	−4	19	
10	Kilmarnock II	22	5	3	14	41	54	−13	13	
11	Dunfermline Athletic II	22	4	3	15	43	84	−41	11	
12	Edinburgh City	22	2	4	16	28	85	−57	8	

== See also ==
- 1948–49 in Scottish football
