= John Crichton =

John Crichton may refer to:

- John Crichton (designer) (1917–1993), New Zealand furniture and interior designer
- John Crichton (Farscape), a character on the TV series Farscape
- John Crichton, 3rd Earl Erne (1802–1885), Anglo-Irish peer and politician
- John Crichton, 4th Earl Erne (1839–1914), Anglo-Irish peer and politician
- John Crichton, 5th Earl Erne (1907–1940), Anglo-Irish peer, soldier and politician
- Johnny Crichton (born 1925), Scottish footballer
- John Michael Crichton (1942–2008), American author, director and screenwriter

== See also ==
- John Crichton-Stuart (disambiguation)
