= 1947–48 Heart of Midlothian F.C. season =

Heart of Midlothian
1947–48 season
- Manager: David McLean
- Stadium: Tynecastle Park
- Scottish First Division: 9th
- Scottish Cup: Round 2
- League Cup: Quarter-final

During the 1947–48 season Hearts competed in the Scottish First Division, the Scottish Cup, the Scottish League Cup and the East of Scotland Shield.

== Fixtures ==
=== Friendlies ===
24 September 1947 Friendly	Hearts	1–3	Charlton Athletic	Tynecastle Park
	Goal

21 February 1948 Friendly	Stirling Albion	2–0	Hearts	Annfield
	Goal

27 March 1948 Friendly	Dundee	7–4	Hearts	Dens Park
	Goal

26 April 1948 Friendly	Chelsea	4–1	Hearts	Stamford Bridge
	Goal

=== East of Scotland Shield ===
7 April 1948 East of Scotland Shield	Hearts	4–0	Edinburgh City	Tynecastle Park

=== Penman Cup ===
20 August 1947 Round 1	Hearts	2–2	Leith Athletic	Tynecastle Park

20 August 1947 Round 1 Replay	Hearts	7–3	Leith Athletic	Tynecastle Park

1 May 1948 Semi-Final	Hearts	4–1	Alloa Athletic	Tynecastle Park

=== League Cup ===
9 August 1947 League Cup Group	Hearts	2–1	Hibernian	Tynecastle Park
				Attendance: 39,268

16 August 1947 League Cup Group	Airdrieonians	3–2	Hearts	Broomfield Park
				Attendance: 18,000

23 August 1947 League Cup Group	Hearts	1–0	Clyde	Tynecastle Park
				Attendance: 20,745

30 August 1947 League Cup Group	Hibernian	1–2	Hearts	Easter Road
				Attendance: 43,000

6 September 1947 League Cup Group	Hearts	1–0	Airdrieonians	Tynecastle Park
				Attendance: 24,916

13 September 1947 League Cup Group	Clyde	5–2	Hearts	Shawfield Stadium
				Attendance: 12,000

27 September 1947 League Cup Quarter-Final	Hearts	3–4	East Fife	Tynecastle Park
				Attendance: 23,889

=== Scottish Cup ===
24 January 1948 Scottish Cup R1	Dundee	2–4	Hearts	Dens Park
				Attendance: 31,500

7 February 1948 Scottish Cup R2	Airdireonians	2–1	Hearts	Broomfield Park
				Attendance: 24,000

=== Scottish First Division ===
13 August 1947 Scottish First Division	Hearts	3–2	St Mirren	Tynecastle Park
				Attendance: 20,103

27 August 1947 Scottish First Division	Motherwell	3–1	Hearts	Tynecastle Park
				Attendance: 14,000

20 September 1947 Scottish First Division	Hearts	2–1	Hibernian	Tynecastle Park
				Attendance: 47,752

4 October 1947 Scottish First Division	Hearts	1–3	Third Lanark	Tynecastle Park
				Attendance: 18,787

6 October 1947 Scottish First Division	Dundee	2–1	Hearts	Dens Park
				Attendance: 26,000

18 October 1947 Scottish First Division	Hearts	1–2	Partick Thistle	Tynecastle Park
				Attendance: 19,665

1 November 1947 Scottish First Division	Hearts	1–0	Queen's Park	Tynecastle Park
				Attendance: 12,975

8 November 1947 Scottish First Division	Morton	1–1	Hearts	Cappielow Park
				Attendance: 5,000

15 November 1947 Scottish First Division	Aberdeen	1–1	Hearts	Pittodrie Park
				Attendance: 10,000

22 November 1947 Scottish First Division	Hearts	1–0	Queen of the South	Tynecastle Park
				Attendance: 10,399

29 November 1947 Scottish First Division	Airdrieonians	1–1	Hearts	Broomfield Park
				Attendance: 9,000

6 December 1947 Scottish First Division	Hearts	1–2	Rangers	Tynecastle Park
				Attendance: 35,750

13 December 1947 Scottish First Division	Clyde	2–1	Hearts	Shawfield Stadium
				Attendance: 12,000

20 December 1947 Scottish First Division	St Mirren	1–0	Hearts	St Mirren Park, Love Street
				Attendance: 18,000

25 December 1947 Scottish First Division	Celtic	4–2	Hearts	Celtic Park
				Attendance: 30,000

27 December 1947 Scottish First Division	Hearts	0–1	Motherwell	Tynecastle Park
				Attendance: 13,467

1 January 1948 Scottish First Division	Hibernian	3–1	Hearts	Easter Road
				Attendance: 45,000

3 January 1948 Scottish First Division	Hearts	1–0	Celtic	Tynecastle Park
				Attendance: 36,729

10 January 1948 Scottish First Division	Third Lanark	4–1	Hearts	Cathkin Park
				Attendance: 15,000

17 January 1948 Scottish First Division	Hearts	0–1	Dundee	Tynecastle Park
				Attendance: 25,607

31 January 1948 Scottish First Division	Partick Thistle	1–1	Hearts	Firhill Park
				Attendance: 34,000

14 February 1948 Scottish First Division	Hearts	3–2	Falkirk	Tynecastle Park
				Attendance: 28,111

28 February 1948 Scottish First Division	Hearts	3–0	Morton	Tynecastle Park
				Attendance: 28,379

6 March 1948 Scottish First Division	Hearts	1–1	Aberdeen	Tynecastle Park
				Attendance: 17,937

13 March 1948 Scottish First Division	Queen of the South	0–1	Hearts	Palmerston Park
				Attendance: 11,200

20 March 1948 Scottish First Division	Hearts	2–2	Airdrieonians	Tynecastle Park
				Attendance: 17,458

3 April 1948 Scottish First Division	Hearts	1–1	Clyde	Tynecastle Park
				Attendance: 21,247

17 April 1948 Scottish First Division	Falkirk	0–2	Hearts	Palmerston Park
				Attendance: 9,000

24 April 1948 Scottish First Division	Queen's Park	0–0	Hearts	Hampden Park
				Attendance: 10,288

3 May 1948 Scottish First Division	Rangers	1–2	Hearts	Ibrox Park
				Attendance: 10,000

== See also ==
- List of Heart of Midlothian F.C. seasons
