= Andrew Herd =

Andrew Herd may refer to:

- Sandy Herd (1868–1944), Scottish golfer, Open Championship winner in 1902
- Sandy Herd (footballer) (born 1902), Scottish football player (Dundee FC, Dunfermline Athletic, Heart of Midlothian FC, East Fife, Scotland)
