= George Drummond =

George Drummond may refer to:

- George Drummond (politician) (1688–1766), Scottish politician
- George Drummond (footballer, born 1865) (1865–1914), Scottish footballer
- George Drummond (Cowdenbeath footballer) (c. 1872–1912), Scottish footballer
- George Alexander Drummond (1829–1910), Scottish-Canadian businessman and senator
- George Edward Drummond (1858–1919), Irish-Canadian businessman and financier
- George Hay-Drummond, 12th Earl of Kinnoull (1827–1897), Scottish earl
- George Drummond (cricketer) (1883–1963), English cricketer
- George Stirling Home Drummond (1813–1876), Scottish landowner and antiquarian
- George Drummond (boxer) (1935–2015), Scottish boxer
