= Alex Menzies =

Alex Menzies may refer to:

- Alex Menzies (forward) (1882–1964), Scottish footballer
- Alex Menzies (midfielder) (died 1990), Scottish footballer
