= Broxburn Athletic F.C. (1887) =

Former association football club in Scotland

Broxburn
- Full name: Broxburn Athletic Football Club
- Nicknames: the Blues, the Albion Parkers
- Founded: 1887
- Dissolved: 1912
- Ground: Albion Park
- Secretary: Stewart M'Donald
Home colours

Broxburn Athletic Football Club was a football club from Broxburn in West Lothian.

== History ==
The club's first known matches were part of a five-a-side tournament at the close of the 1886–87 season. The club originally played as a Junior club.

The club became a senior club in 1905 and started to enter the Scottish Cup via the qualifying cup competition, as well as other local competitions, including the Penman Cup for clubs in the east of Scotland; Athletic was runner-up in 1906–07, going down to Bathgate at the third time of asking.

The club reached the first round proper of the Scottish Cup on one occasion, in 1911–12. The club had lost twice in the early rounds of the qualifying competition but had the results overturned on appeal. On the first occasion, the replayed match against West Calder Swifts was abandoned after 85 minutes due a pitch invasion from the Swifts' fans, and the score at the time — 1–0 to Broxburn — was allowed to stand.

In the competition itself, Athletic beat Beith in the first round 6–0, before a crowd of a mere 400. Third Lanark was much too strong in the second round, beating Athletic 6–1, Raitt scoring a hat-trick, and the Blues' consolation coming from M'Laren on the stroke of half-time, when the club was already three down.

At the start of April 1912, the Athletic and Broxburn F.C. agreed to a merger, the new club to be called Broxburn United. The last match for the clubs was the final of the Gardeners' Cup (a charity invitational competition of long standing), won by Broxburn; a week later for Athletics players played for Broxburn against Rangers in a friendly "with a view to testing their qualifications for 'The United'". A new Junior club with the same name was formed after the First World War.

== Colours ==
The club originally played in maroon, changing to blue in 1906.

== Ground ==
The club's home ground was Albion (now Albyn) Park.

== Honours ==
- Linlithgowshire Junior Cup: 1900–01, 1901–02
- East of Scotland Consolation Cup: 1906–07
- Broxburn Charity Cup: 1900–01
- Moffat Cup: 1895–96, 1896–97, 1898–99, 1899–1900
- East of Scotland Junior Cup: 1889–90, 1896–97, 1903–04
