= Hearts of Beath F.C. =

Hearts of Beath
- Full name: Hearts of Beath Football Club
- Nickname(s): the Hearts, the Hillmen
- Founded: 1883
- Dissolved: 1942
- Ground: Keir's Park
Home colours

Hearts of Beath F.C. was a Scottish football club.

== History ==
Formed in 1886 in the village of Hill of Beath, Fife, the club was a senior team from 1897 until 1913, playing in the Scottish Cup between those years.

=== Senior football ===
The club's first entry to the Cup, via the Scottish Qualifying Cup, in 1897 saw the club surprisingly beat Dunfermline Athletic in the first round, but the Pars successfully protested on the basis that the Hearts did not have goal nets in place. Dunfermline duly won the replay.

=== Local leagues ===
1896–97 saw the club's first senior league football, in the Central Football League, although the season was the competition's final instalment. The club only won one match - a 6–5 win at Kirkcaldy in which the Hearts scored three goals in three second-half minutes.

The attraction of the Scottish League meant that clubs outside looked to alternative competitions to fill Saturday fixtures, but many of these were of short duration. Hearts of Beath played in the following:

- 1903–04: Central Combination
- 1904–05: Eastern League - the club withdrew after six matches
- 1906–07: Northern League - the club finished bottom and its failure to play against Dundee's reserve side, due to a financial condition that suggested the club was "tottering to its death", led to the title being shared between Kirkcaldy United and Dundee 'A'
- 1910–11: Midland League
- 1912–13: return to Eastern League

The club was the Midland League champion in 1910–11, although by then it only had three clubs, the others being Dunblane and Clackmannan.

=== Cup competitions ===
The club's best run in the Scottish Cup was reaching the fourth round of the Qualifying Cup in 1903–04, losing to West Calder Swifts on a "perfect quagmire", in a tie which was replayed after a Hearts protest. However reaching that stage put the club into the first round of the competition proper for the only time. The first round tie was at St Johnstone, and the Saints, despite having a lighter side, won 2–0, the tie being goalless until the Saints were awarded a penalty in the 75th minute after Meldrum tripped Ramage.

In 1904, the club was the first opponent of Broxburn at its new Sports Field ground, in the East of Scotland Cup qualifying section; the tie had originally been played at Shamrock Park, because Sports Field was not ready, so Hearts of Beath protested the defeat on the basis that Shamrock Park had not been registered as Broxburn's home ground. The protest availed the Hillmen little as Broxburn won the replayed tie 2–1.

The club's greatest local honour was winning the King Cup in 1902–03, when scheduled final opponents Lochgelly United refused to play on the scheduled date, although there was a brief move to deny the club the trophy, on the basis that it intended to quit the Fifeshire FA; the club duly did leave, in favour of the East of Scotland FA, but only after the 1903–04 season.

=== Return to junior football ===
The club returned to junior football in 1914–15, playing in the Fifeshire junior league until World War 2.

The club folded in 1942, but the name was revived in 1988, as Hearts of Beath J.F.C., by a children's club based in neighbouring Cowdenbeath, now in partnership with senior side Cowdenbeath F.C.

== Colours ==
The club originally played in light blue, changing to maroon jerseys in 1898, with white shorts and black socks.

== Ground ==
The club was based at Keir's Park in the village, now home of Hill of Beath Hawthorn.

== Notable players ==
- George Drummond
- Jim Harley
- Sandy Herd
- Joe Murphy
- Sandy Paterson
- Charles Scott
