= 1947–48 Celtic F.C. season =

Celtic
1947–48 season
- Manager: Jimmy McGrory
- Stadium: Celtic Park
- Scottish Division A: 12th
- Scottish Cup: Semi-final
- Scottish League Cup: Group stage

During the 1947–48 Scottish football season, Celtic competed in Scottish Division A.

== Competitions ==
=== Scottish Division A ===
==== League table ====
Pos	Team	Pld	W	D	L	GF	GA	GD	Pts
10	Aberdeen	30	10	7	13	45	45	0	27
11	Third Lanark	30	10	6	14	56	73	−17	26
12	Celtic	30	10	5	15	41	56	−15	25
13	Queen of the South	30	10	5	15	49	74	−25	25
14	Morton	30	9	6	15	47	43	+4	24

Source: SPFL

==== Matches ====
13 August 1947 Division A	Airdrieonians	3–2	Celtic	Airdrie
				Stadium: Broomfield Park; Attendance: 20,000

27 August 1947 Division A	Celtic	4–0	Queen's Park	Glasgow
				Stadium: Celtic Park; Attendance: 15,000

20 September 1947 Division A	Rangers	2–0	Celtic	Glasgow
				Stadium: Ibrox Park; Attendance: 50,000

27 September 1947 Division A	Celtic	0–1	Motherwell	Glasgow
				Stadium: Celtic Park; Attendance: 25,000

4 October 1947 Division A	Aberdeen	2–0	Celtic	Aberdeen
				Stadium: Pittodrie Park; Attendance: 25,000

11 October 1947 Division A	Celtic	3–2	Morton	Glasgow
				Stadium: Celtic Park; Attendance: 14,000

18 October 1947 Division A	Clyde	2–0	Celtic	Glasgow
				Stadium: Shawfield Stadium; Attendance: 20,000

25 October 1947 Division A	Celtic	4–3	Queen of the South	Glasgow
				Stadium: Celtic Park; Attendance: 12,000

8 November 1947 Division A	Celtic	0–3	Falkirk	Glasgow
				Stadium: Celtic Park; Attendance: 14,000

15 November 1947 Division A	Partick Thistle	3–5	Celtic	Glasgow
				Stadium: Firhill Park; Attendance: 32,000

22 November 1947 Division A	St Mirren	1–2	Celtic	Paisley
				Stadium: St Mirren Park, Love Street; Attendance: 20,000

6 December 1947 Division A	Celtic	1–1	Dundee	Glasgow
				Stadium: Celtic Park; Attendance: 20,000

13 December 1947 Division A	Hibernian	1–1	Celtic	Edinburgh
				Stadium: Easter Road; Attendance: 38,000

20 December 1947 Division A	Celtic	0–0	Airdrieonians	Glasgow
				Stadium: Celtic Park; Attendance: 12,000

25 December 1947 Division A	Celtic	4–2	Hearts	Glasgow
				Stadium: Celtic Park; Attendance: 30,000

27 December 1947 Division A	Queen's Park	3–2	Celtic	Glasgow
				Stadium: Hampden Park; Attendance: 17,922

2 January 1948 Division A	Celtic	0–4	Rangers	Glasgow
				Stadium: Celtic Park; Attendance: 60,000

3 January 1948 Division A	Hearts	1–0	Celtic	Edinburgh
				Stadium: Tynecastle Park; Attendance: 36,729

10 January 1948 Division A	Celtic	1–0	Aberdeen	Glasgow
				Stadium: Celtic Park; Attendance: 25,000

17 January 1948 Division A	Morton	4–0	Celtic	Greenock
				Stadium: Cappielow Park; Attendance: 12,000

24 January 1948 Division A	Celtic	1–2	Partick Thistle	Glasgow
				Stadium: Celtic Park; Attendance: 15,000

31 January 1948 Division A	Celtic	0–0	Clyde	Glasgow
				Stadium: Celtic Park; Attendance: 15,000

14 February 1948 Division A	Queen of the South	2–0	Celtic	Dumfries
				Stadium: Palmerston Park; Attendance: 13,500

28 February 1948 Division A	Falkirk	0–1	Celtic	Falkirk
				Stadium: Brockville Park; Attendance: 20,000

13 March 1949 Division A	Celtic	0–0	St Mirren	Glasgow
				Stadium: Celtic Park; Attendance: 18,000

20 March 1948 Division A	Motherwell	0–3	Celtic	Motherwell
				Stadium: Fir Park; Attendance: 20,000

29 March 1948 Division A	Third Lanark	5–1	Celtic	Glasgow
				Stadium: Cathkin Park; Attendance: 25,000

3 April 1949 Division A	Celtic	2–4	Hibernian	Glasgow
				Stadium: Celtic Park; Attendance: 30,000

10 April 1948 Division A	Celtic	1–3	Third Lanark	Glasgow
15:00 BST				Stadium: Celtic Park; Attendance: 10,000

17 April 1948 Division A	Dundee	2–3	Celtic	Dundee
				Stadium: Dens Park; Attendance: 31,000

=== Scottish Cup ===
7 February 1948 Second round	Celtic	3–0	Cowdenbeath	Glasgow
				Stadium: Celtic Park; Attendance: 19,931

21 February 1948 Third round	Celtic	1–0	Motherwell	Glasgow
				Stadium: Celtic Park; Attendance: 55,231

6 March 1948 Fourth round	Celtic	4–0	Montrose	Glasgow
				Stadium: Celtic Park; Attendance: 39,077

27 March 1948 Semi-final	Morton	1–0	Celtic	Glasgow
				Stadium: Ibrox Park; Attendance: 80,000

=== Scottish League Cup ===
9 August 1947 Group 8	Rangers	2–0	Celtic	Glasgow
				Stadium: Ibrox Park; Attendance: 80,000

16 August 1947 Group 8	Celtic	1–1	Dundee	Glasgow
				Stadium: Celtic Park; Attendance: 35,000

23 August 1947 Group 8	Celtic	3–1	Third Lanark	Glasgow
				Stadium: Celtic Park; Attendance: 25,000

30 August 1947 Group 8	Celtic	2–0	Rangers	Glasgow
				Stadium: Celtic Park; Attendance: 60,000

6 September 1947 Group 8	Dundee	4–1	Celtic	Dundee
				Stadium: Dens Park; Attendance: 35,000

13 September 1947 Group 8	Third Lanark	3–2	Celtic	Glasgow
				Stadium: Cathkin Park; Attendance: 21,044
