= Patrick Slavin =

Scottish footballer (1877–1916)

Personal information
- Full name: Patrick Slavin
- Date of birth: 5 May 1877
- Place of birth: Shotts, Scotland
- Date of death: 13 November 1916 (aged 39)
- Place of death: near Serre-lès-Puisieux, France
- Position: Outside right

Senior career*
Years	Team	Apps	(Gls)
–1897	Fauldhouse Hibs		
1897	Celtic	1	(0)
1897–1898	Motherwell	10	(4)
1898–1900	Dykehead		
1900	Carfin Shamrock		
1900	Dykehead		
1900	Albion Rovers		
1900–1901	East Benhar Rangers		
- Heatherbell
- Broxburn
- West Calder Swifts
- * Club domestic league appearances and goals

Patrick Slavin (5 May 1877 – 13 November 1916) was a Scottish professional footballer who played in the Scottish League for Motherwell and Celtic as an outside right.

== Personal life ==
Slavin served as a sergeant in the Royal Scots during the First World War. At the time of his enlistment in February 1915, he was working as a foreman at Braehead Quarry, Edinburgh. Slavin was killed during a failed attack on Serre-lès-Puisieux on 13 November 1916, during the Battle of the Ancre. He was buried in Serre Road Cemetery No. 2.

== Career statistics ==
Appearances and goals by club, season and competition
Club	Season	League			Scottish Cup		Total	
Club	Season	Division	Apps	Goals	Apps	Goals	Apps	Goals
Celtic	1896–97	Scottish First Division	1	0	0	0	1	0
Motherwell	1897-89	Scottish Second Division	10	4	2	0	12	4
Career total			11	4	2	0	13	4
