= 1948–49 British Home Championship =

Tournament details
- Host country: United Kingdom
- Dates: 9 October 1948 – 9 April 1949
- Teams: 4

Final positions
- Champions: Scotland
- Runners-up: England

Tournament statistics
- Matches played: 6
- Goals scored: 24 (4 per match)
- Top scorer: (Ireland) Davy Walsh (4)

The 1948–49 British Home Championship was a football tournament played between the British Home Nations. The tournament was notable for it being the final competition the Home Nations competed in before they joined the FIFA World Cup and thus the last time it was the most important international football tournament in Britain.

England began the tournament the strongest with a 6–2 success over the Irish in Belfast. Scotland began well also, beating the Welsh in Cardiff, which they followed with a narrow success against Ireland in a highly competitive match. England too took maximum points from their second game with a close 1–0 win over the Welsh. In the final games, Wales beat Ireland to take third place whilst the Scots succeeded in strongly defeating England at Wembley Stadium to take the championship.

== Table ==
Team	Pld	W	D	L	GF	GA	GD	Pts
Scotland (C)	3	3	0	0	9	4	+5	6
England	3	2	0	1	8	5	+3	4
Wales	3	1	0	2	3	4	−1	2
Ireland	3	0	0	3	4	11	−7	0

Rules for classification: 1) points. The points system worked as follows: 2 points for a win and 1 point for a draw.
(C) Champions

== Results ==
9 October 1948

Ireland	2–6	England
Walsh		Mortensen; Matthews; Milburn; Pearson

Windsor Park, Belfast

23 October 1948

Wales	1–3	Scotland
Jones 25'	Scottish FA	Howie 15'; Waddell 27', 43'

Ninian Park, Cardiff
Attendance: 59,911
Referee: David Maxwell (Ireland)

10 November 1948

England	1–0	Wales
Finney

Villa Park, Birmingham
Referee: Jack Mowat (Scotland)

17 November 1948

Scotland	3–2	Ireland
Houliston 29', 89'; Mason 73'		Walsh 1', 5'

Hampden Park, Glasgow
Attendance: 93,000
Referee: William H. Evans (England)

9 March 1949

Ireland	0–2	Wales
		Edwards; Ford

Windsor Park, Belfast

9 April 1949

England	1–3	Scotland
Milburn 75'		Mason 28'; Steel 52'; Reilly 61'

Wembley Stadium, London
Attendance: 98,188
Referee: Mervyn Griffiths (Wales)
