= 1908–09 Scottish Cup =

The 1908–09 Scottish Cup was the 36th season of Scotland's most prestigious football knockout competition. The Cup was not awarded in this season due to serious riots in the replay of the final between Rangers and Celtic.

== Calendar ==
Round	First match date	Fixtures	Clubs
First Round	23 January 1909	16	32 → 16
Second Round	6 February 1909	8	16 → 8
Quarter-finals	20 February 1909	4	8 → 4
Semi-finals	20 March 1909	2	4 → 2
Final	10 April 1909	1	2 → 1

== First round ==
Home team	Score	Away team
Alloa	2 – 2	St Mirren
Broxburn	1 – 1	Beith
Clyde	4 – 0	Dykehead
Dundee	9 – 0	Ayr Parkhouse
Falkirk	2 – 1	East Stirlingshire
Hamilton Academical	0 – 0	Queen's Park
Heart of Midlothian	2 – 1	Kilmarnock
Hibernian	2 – 1	Ayr
Leith Athletic	2 – 4	Celtic
Greenock Morton	0 – 4	Aberdeen
Motherwell	6 – 1	Elgin City
Port Glasgow Athletic	5 – 0	Dunblane
St Johnstone	0 – 3	Rangers
Third Lanark	5 – 1	Brechin City
Vale of Leven	8 – 0	Airdrieonians
West Calder Swifts	0 – 0	Partick Thistle

=== Replays ===
Home team	Score	Away team
Airdrieonians	1 – 0	Vale of Leven
Beith	0 – 0	Broxburn
Partick Thistle	Walkover	West Calder Swifts
Queen's Park	2 – 0	Hamilton Academical
St Mirren	5 – 0	Alloa Athletic

=== Second replay ===
Home team	Score	Away team
Beith	1 – 1 (a.e.t.)	Broxburn

Match played at Ibrox Park

=== Third replay ===
Home team	Score	Away team
Beith	1 – 1 (a.e.t.)	Broxburn

Match played at Ibrox

=== Fourth replay ===
Home team	Score	Away team
Beith	4 – 2	Broxburn

Match played at Love Street

== Second round ==
Home team	Score	Away team
Airdrieonians	2 – 0	Heart of Midlothian
Celtic	4 – 0	Port Glasgow Athletic
Clyde	1 – 0	Hibernian
Dundee	0 – 0	Rangers
Motherwell	1 – 3	Falkirk
Queen's Park	3 – 0	Partick Thistle
St Mirren	3 – 0	Beith
Third Lanark	4 – 1	Aberdeen

=== Replay ===
Home team	Score	Away team
Rangers	1 – 0	Dundee

== Quarter-finals ==
Home team	Score	Away team
Celtic	3 – 1	Airdrieonians
Clyde	3 – 1	St Mirren
Rangers	1 – 0	Queen's Park
Third Lanark	1 – 2	Falkirk

== Semi-finals ==
20 March 1909

Celtic	0–0	Clyde

20 March 1909

Falkirk	0–1	Rangers

=== Replay ===
27 March 1909

Celtic	2–0	Clyde

Attendance: 23,000

== Final ==
10 April 1909

Rangers	2–2	Celtic
Bennett; Gilchrist		Quinn (o.g.)

Hampden Park, Glasgow
Attendance: 70000

=== Replay ===
17 April 1909

Rangers	1–1	Celtic
Gordon		Quinn

Hampden Park, Glasgow
Attendance: 60000

== See also ==
- 1908–09 in Scottish football
