= Broxburn F.C. (1902) =

Former association football club in Scotland

Broxburn
- Full name: Broxburn Football Club
- Nickname: the Whites
- Founded: 1902
- Dissolved: 1912
- Ground: Crow Park
Home colours

Broxburn Football Club was a football club from Broxburn in West Lothian.

== History ==
The club was formed in 1902 as a "resuscitation" of the previous Broxburn senior club, which had ceased operations in 1894. The club's first match was against Mossend Swifts F.C. on 15 March 1902 and included a number of players who had played for the previous incarnation.

The club entered the Scottish Cup via the qualifying competition from 1902 to 1911. The club won through the Qualifying Cup far enough to qualify for the Scottish Cup itself twice. The first time was in the club's competition debut in 1902–03, starting off with a 7–0 win at Mossend Swifts. The tie against local rivals Bathgate in the second round was controversial. Bathgate won the fixture 2–1, disappointing the 300 who had travelled from Broxburn on special trains, but the Scottish Football Association upheld a Broxburn protest on the basis that goalkeeper Martin Hughes of Bathgate was ineligible for the Cup, as he had played for another side in a 5-a-side match pre-season. Bathgate's counter-protest that Broxburn had not paid the 10s deposit was controversially overruled, and Broxburn won the replayed tie 8–3, Bathgate's Gillon being sent off early on for kicking a Broxburn player; replacement goalkeeper Boyd described as being "dropped from Mars to learn the game" and that "goal-keeping was not his strong point".

The club lost to Stenhousemuir - eventual semi-finalists in the Scottish Cup itself - in the fourth round of the Qualifying Cup 2–1, the winning goal coming from goalkeeper Fairley being charged over the line, and the referee originally giving a free-kick to Broxburn, but changing his mind under pressure from the home fans. Nevertheless, the club had already become entitled to enter the main competition; drawn away at Leith Athletic, the club bowed out by a 4–1 score, having surprised the Edinburgh side by taking an early lead.

The second time was in 1908–09, when it was drawn to play Beith in the first round. The match required four replays before it was finally decided in favour of Beith, the final tie taking place at Love Street, the ground of St Mirren, on 5 February 1909, the day before the tie's winners were to play the Buddies in the second round.

The club was however successful locally. It was a three-time winner of the Linlithgowshire Cup, and also won the City Cup in 1909–10, albeit that competition by then was restricted to four clubs (the others being Leith Athletic, St Bernards, and West Calder Swifts).

At the start of April 1912, the club and Broxburn Athletic agreed to a merger, the new club to be called Broxburn United. The last match for the clubs was the final of the Gardeners' Cup (a charity invitational competition of long standing), won by Broxburn; a week later for Athletics players played for Broxburn against Rangers in a friendly "with a view to testing their qualifications for 'The United'".

== Colours ==
The club originally played in white jerseys, changing to blue in 1910.

== Ground ==
The club's first home ground was Crow Park, on Station Road. This was a distance from the town centre and in 1904 the club obtained support from local businessmen to restore the old ground at Sports Field, the pitch being 112 yards x 60 yards, and with a cycling track around it. The first match at Sports Field was a 2–1 win over Hearts of Beath in the East of Scotland Cup qualifying section, on 17 September; the tie had originally been played at Shamrock Park, because Sports Field was not ready, but Hearts of Beath protested the defeat on the basis that Shamrock Park had not been registered as Broxburn's home ground.
