= 1949–50 Heart of Midlothian F.C. season =

Heart of Midlothian
1949–50 season
- Manager: David McLean
- Stadium: Tynecastle Park
- Scottish First Division: 4th
- Scottish Cup: Round 2
- League Cup: Group Stage

During the 1949–50 season Hearts competed in the Scottish First Division, the Scottish Cup, the Scottish League Cup and the East of Scotland Shield.

== Fixtures ==
=== Friendlies ===
8 March 1950 Friendly	Inverness Select	0–3	Hearts	Inverness

1 April 1950 Friendly	Hearts	2–0	Motherwell	Tynecastle Park

26 April 1950 Friendly	Chelsea	3–2	Hearts	Stamford Bridge

28 April 1950 Friendly	Brighton and Hove Albion	1–1	Hearts	Goldstone Ground

=== East of Scotland Shield ===
10 May 1950 Semi-Final	Hearts	5–2	Leith Athletic	Tynecastle Park

=== Penman Cup ===
8 October 1949 Round 2	Stirling Albion	4–2	Hearts	Annfield

=== League Cup ===
13 August 1949 League Cup Group	Stirling Albion	1–5	Hearts	Annfield
				Attendance: 20,000

17 August 1949 League Cup Group	Hearts	5–1	Raith Rovers	Tynecastle Park
				Attendance: 33,314

20 August 1949 League Cup Group	Hearts	1–1	East Fife	Tynecastle Park
				Attendance: 40,289

27 August 1949 League Cup Group	Hearts	4–5	Stirling Albion	Tynecastle Park
				Attendance: 22,511

31 August 1949 League Cup Group	Raith Rovers	1–2	Hearts	Stark's Park
				Attendance: 17,000

3 September 1949 League Cup Group	East Fife	4–3	Hearts	Bayview Park
				Attendance: 17,500

=== Scottish Cup ===
28 January 1950 Scottish Cup R1	Hearts	1–1	Dundee	Tynecastle Park
				Attendance: 39,568

6 February 1950 Scottish Cup R1 Replay	Dundee	1–2	Hearts	Dens Park
				Attendance: 29,000

11 February 1950 Scottish Cup R2	Aberdeen	3–1	Hearts	Pittodrie Park
				Attendance: 42,000

=== Scottish First Division ===
10 September 1949 Scottish First Division	Hearts	0–1	East Fife	Tynecastle Park
				Attendance: 29,546

17 September 1949 Scottish First Division	Celtic	3–2	Hearts	Celtic Park
				Attendance: 30,000

24 September 1949 Scottish First Division	Hearts	5–2	Hibernian	Tynecastle Park
				Attendance: 37,730

1 October 1949 Scottish First Division	St Mirren	3–3	Hearts	St Mirren Park, Love Street
				Attendance: 25,000

15 October 1949 Scottish First Division	Third Lanark	3–0	Hearts	Cathkin Park
				Attendance: 16,000

22 October 1949 Scottish First Division	Rangers	1–0	Hearts	Ibrox Park
				Attendance: 50,000

29 October 1949 Scottish First Division	Hearts	6–2	Clyde	Tynecastle Park
				Attendance: 23,229

5 November 1949 Scottish First Division	Partick Thistle	0–1	Hearts	Firhill Park
				Attendance: 15,000

12 November 1949 Scottish First Division	Hearts	9–0	Falkirk	Tynecastle Park
				Attendance: 20,022

19 November 1949 Scottish First Division	Queen of the South	0–4	Hearts	Palmerston Park
				Attendance: 10,000

26 November 1949 Scottish First Division	Hearts	2–0	Motherwell	Tynecastle Park
				Attendance: 30,241

3 December 1949 Scottish First Division	Hearts	4–1	Aberdeen	Tynecastle Park
				Attendance: 27,590

10 December 1949 Scottish First Division	Stirling Albion	2–4	Hearts	Annfield
				Attendance: 20,000

17 December 1949 Scottish First Division	Hearts	2–0	Raith Rovers	Tynecastle Park
				Attendance: 20,978

24 December 1949 Scottish First Division	East Fife	0–1	Hearts	Bayview Park
				Attendance: 20,000

31 December 1949 Scottish First Division	Hearts	4–2	Celtic	Tynecastle Park
				Attendance: 44,283

2 January 1950 Scottish First Division	Hibernian	1–2	Hearts	Easter Road
				Attendance: 65,840

3 January 1950 Scottish First Division	Hearts	5–0	St Mirren	Tynecastle Park
				Attendance: 33,732

7 January 1950 Scottish First Division	Dundee	3–1	Hearts	Dens Park
				Attendance: 33,500

14 January 1950 Scottish First Division	Hearts	1–0	Third Lanark	Tynecastle Park
				Attendance: 25,106

21 January 1950 Scottish First Division	Hearts	0–1	Rangers	Tynecastle Park
				Attendance: 46,285

4 February 1950 Scottish First Division	Clyde	3–4	Hearts	Shawfield Stadium
				Attendance: 19,500

18 February 1950 Scottish First Division	Hearts	1–1	Falkirk	Brockville Park
				Attendance: 14,000

25 February 1950 Scottish First Division	Hearts	3–0	Queen of the South	Tynecastle Park
				Attendance: 17,682

4 March 1950 Scottish First Division	Motherwell	2–3	Hearts	Fir Park
				Attendance: 12,000

18 March 1950 Scottish First Division	Hearts	5–2	Stirling Albion	Tynecastle Park
				Attendance: 15,329

25 March 1950 Scottish First Division	Raith Rovers	2–0	Hearts	Stark's Park
				Attendance: 19,000

8 April 1950 Scottish First Division	Aberdeen	0–5	Hearts	Pittodrie Park
				Attendance: 16,000

17 April 1950 Scottish First Division	Hearts	3–2	Partick Thistle	Tynecastle Park
				Attendance: 18,489

22 April 1950 Scottish First Division	Hearts	6–2	Dundee	Tynecastle Park
				Attendance: 19,447

== See also ==
- List of Heart of Midlothian F.C. seasons
