= Sandy Paterson (football manager) =

Scottish footballer and manager

Personal information
- Full name: Alexander Paterson
- Date of birth: 30 July 1876
- Place of birth: Hill of Beath, Scotland
- Date of death: 13 December 1933 (aged 57)
- Place of death: Dunfermline, Scotland
- Position: Goalkeeper

Senior career*
Years	Team	Apps	(Gls)
- Hearts of Beath

Managerial career
- –1906: Hearts of Beath
- 1906–1924: Cowdenbeath
- 1925–1930: Dunfermline Athletic
- 1932–1933: Cowdenbeath
- * Club domestic league appearances and goals

Alexander Paterson (30 July 1876 – 13 December 1933) was a Scottish football manager who managed Scottish League clubs Cowdenbeath and Dunfermline Athletic. He began his career in football as a goalkeeper with Hearts of Beath and also served Cowdenbeath as an administrator.

== Personal life ==
Paterson's sons Bill and Archie both became footballers and he managed them at Cowdenbeath and Dunfermline Athletic respectively.

== Honours ==
Hearts of Beath

- Fife Cup: 1900–01, 1902–03
- King Cup: 1902–03

Cowdenbeath

- Scottish League Division Two: 1913–14, 1914–15
- Scottish League Division Two second-place promotion: 1923–24
- Eastern League: 1916–17, 1917–18

Dunfermline Athletic

- Scottish League Division Two: 1925–26

== Managerial statistics ==
Managerial record by team and tenure
Team	From	To	Record					Ref
Team	From	To	P	W	D	L	Win %	Ref
Cowdenbeath	1906	1924	322	146	61	115	45.3	
Dunfermline Athletic	1925	1930	199	74	33	92	37.2	
Cowdenbeath	1932	1933	59	13	10	36	22.0	
Total			580	233	104	243	40.2	—
