= Frank Mennie =

Scottish footballer

Personal information
- Date of birth: 30 October 1923
- Place of birth: Coatbridge, Scotland
- Date of death: 28 June 1997 (aged 73)
- Place of death: Coatbridge, Scotland
- Position: Left back

Youth career
- Coatbridge St Francis

Senior career*
Years	Team	Apps	(Gls)
1939–1948	Kilmarnock	32	(1)
1948–1951	Clyde	54	(1)
1951–1954	Portadown		

International career
1945	Scotland (wartime)	2	(0)
1949	Scottish League XI	1	(0)
- * Club domestic league appearances and goals

Francis Mennie (30 October 1923 – 28 June 1997) was a Scottish footballer who played as a left back for Kilmarnock, Queen's Park (three seasons of unofficial competitions during World War II), Clyde and Portadown (Northern Ireland). He appeared in the 1949 Scottish Cup Final with Clyde, a defeat to Rangers, and claimed the Gold Cup with Portadown in 1953, scoring the winning goal in the final.

Mennie appeared in two unofficial wartime international matches for Scotland in 1945 (the players who travelled to Belgium were all serving armed forces personnel – he was with the Royal Air Force) and was selected once for the Scottish Football League XI against the English Football League XI in 1949.
