= 1948–49 Scottish Cup =

Tournament details
- Country: Scotland

Final positions
- Champions: Rangers
- Runners-up: Clyde

The 1948–49 Scottish Cup was the 64th staging of Scotland's most prestigious football knockout competition. The final was played between holders Rangers and Clyde at Hampden Park on 23 April 1949. Rangers won 4–1 to retain the Cup.

Rangers also won both the Scottish Football League and the Scottish League Cup, the first time a club claimed the national 'treble'.

== First round ==
Home team	Score	Away team
Alloa Athletic	8 – 3	Montrose
Arbroath	3 – 4	Partick Thistle
Ayr United	2 – 1	Queen's Park
Clyde	2 – 0	Fraserburgh
Cowdenbeath	6 – 2	Keith
Dumbarton	5 – 2	Kilmarnock
Dundee	5 – 1	St Johnstone
Dundee United	4 – 3	Celtic
East Fife	2 – 1	Falkirk
Forfar Athletic	0 – 4	Hibernian
Hamilton Academical	1 – 2	Albion Rovers
Hearts	4 – 1	Airdrieonians
Inverness Caledonian	2 – 2	Greenock Morton
Leith Athletic	0 – 1	Raith Rovers
Motherwell	3 – 0	Stranraer
Queen of the South	2 – 0	East Stirlingshire
Rangers	6 – 1	Elgin City
St Mirren	2 – 0	Stirling Albion
Stenhousemuir	2 – 0	Dunfermline Athletic
Third Lanark	2 – 1	Aberdeen

=== Replays ===
Home team	Score	Away team
Greenock Morton	2 – 0	Inverness Caledonian

== Second round ==
Home team	Score	Away team
Alloa Athletic	1 – 3	Clyde
Ayr United	0 – 2	Greenock Morton
Cowdenbeath	1 – 2	East Fife
Dumbarton	1 – 1	Dundee United
Dundee	0 – 0	St Mirren
Hearts	3 – 1	Third Lanark
Hibernian	1 – 1	Raith Rovers
Motherwell	0 – 3	Rangers
Partick Thistle	3 – 0	Queen of the South
Stenhousemuir	5 – 1	Albion Rovers

=== Replays ===
Home team	Score	Away team
Dundee United	1 – 3	Dumbarton
Raith Rovers	3 – 4	Hibernian
St Mirren	1 – 2	Dundee

== Third round ==
Home team	Score	Away team
Hearts	3 – 0	Dumbarton
Greenock Morton	0 – 2	Clyde

== Quarter-finals ==
Home team	Score	Away team
Hearts	2 – 4	Dundee
Hibernian	0 – 2	East Fife
Rangers	4 – 0	Partick Thistle
Stenhousemuir	0 – 1	Clyde

== Semi-finals ==
26 March 1949

Clyde	2–2 (a.e.t.)	Dundee

Attendance: 33,000

26 March 1949

Rangers	3–0	East Fife

Attendance: 104,958

=== Replays ===
4 April 1949

Clyde	2–1	Dundee

Attendance: 50,000

== Final ==
23 April 1949

Rangers	4–1	Clyde
Young 39' (pen.), 55' (pen.); Williamson 41'; Duncanson	Soccerbase	49' Galletly

Hampden Park, Glasgow
Attendance: 108,435
Referee: R. G. Benzie

=== Teams ===
Rangers:
GK	(Scotland) Bobby Brown
RB	(Scotland) George Young
LB	(Scotland) Jock Shaw
RH	(Scotland) Ian McColl
CH	(Scotland) Willie Woodburn
LH	(Scotland) Sammy Cox
RW	(Scotland) Willie Waddell
IR	(Scotland) Jimmy Duncanson
CF	(Scotland) Willie Thornton
IL	(Scotland) Billy Williamson
LW	(Scotland) Eddie Rutherford
Manager:
(Scotland) Bill Struth

Clyde:
GK	(Scotland) Stan Gullan
RB	(Scotland) Alex Gibson
LB	(Scotland) Frank Mennie
RH	(Scotland) Jim Campbell
CH	(Scotland) Bob Milligan
LH	(Scotland) Hugh Long
RW	(South Africa) Roy Davies
IR	(Scotland) Archie Wright
CF	(Scotland) Alex Linwood
IL	(Scotland) Peter Galletly
LW	(Scotland) Charlie Bootland
Manager:
(Scotland) Paddy Travers

== See also ==
- 1948–49 in Scottish football
- 1948–49 Scottish League Cup
