= Alex Gibson (footballer, born 1925) =

Scottish footballer

Alex Gibson (25 January 1925 – 21 April 1993) was a Scottish footballer, who played as a right back for Arthurlie, Clyde, Hull City, Stirling Albion and Morton. Gibson played in the 1949 Scottish Cup Final for Clyde.
