= Roy Davies (soccer) =

South African footballer

Personal information
- Full name: Ronald Alfred Davies
- Date of birth: 23 August 1924
- Place of birth: Cape Town, South Africa
- Date of death: 10 December 1973 (aged 49)
- Place of death: Hitchin, England
- Position: Winger

Senior career*
Years	Team	Apps	(Gls)
1945	Clyde-Pinelands		
1946–1947	Germiston Callies		
1947–1951	Clyde	60	(16)
1950	→ East Rand Stars (loan)		
1951–1958	Luton Town	150	(26)
1958	Bedford Town	7	(3)
1958–1959	Weymouth	24	(2)
- * Club domestic league appearances and goals

Ronald Alfred "Roy" Davies (23 August 1924 – 10 December 1973) was a South African professional soccer player.

== Career ==
Davies played for Germiston Callies in his native South Africa, before his career was interrupted by the Second World War. Following the conflict, Davies signed for Scottish club Clyde, where he spent four years and made 60 league appearances, also playing in the 1949 Scottish Cup Final.

Joining English team Luton Town in 1951, Davies played 171 games for the club before moving into semi-retirement with Bedford Town and Weymouth.

During his period with Luton, Davies also made 13 appearances as a fast bowler for Bedfordshire County Cricket Club in the Minor Counties Championship.
