= Archie Paterson =

Scottish footballer

Personal information
- Full name: Archibald Beveridge Paterson
- Date of birth: 13 July 1908
- Place of birth: Hill of Beath, Scotland
- Date of death: July 1995 (aged 86–87)
- Place of death: Wolverhampton, England
- Positions: Wing half; outside right

Senior career*
Years	Team	Apps	(Gls)
1928–1930	Dunfermline Athletic	54	(3)
1930–1931	Forfar Athletic	27	(0)
1931–1932	Montrose	3	(0)
- * Club domestic league appearances and goals

Archibald Beveridge Paterson (13 July 1908 – 1995) was a Scottish footballer who played in the Scottish League for Dunfermline Athletic, Forfar Athletic and Montrose as a wing half.

== Personal life ==
Paterson was the younger half-brother of footballer Bill Paterson and the son of football manager Sandy Paterson.

== Career statistics ==
Appearances and goals by club, season and competition
Club	Season	League			Scottish Cup		Total	
Club	Season	Division	Apps	Goals	Apps	Goals	Apps	Goals
Dunfermline Athletic	1928–29	Scottish Division One	9	0	1	0	10	0
Dunfermline Athletic	1929–30	Scottish Division Two	35	3	1	0	36	3
Dunfermline Athletic	1930–31	Scottish Division Two	10	0	1	0	11	0
Dunfermline Athletic	Total		54	3	3	0	57	3
Forfar Athletic	1930–31	Scottish Division Two	27	0	1	0	28	0
Montrose	1931–32	Scottish Division Two	3	0	0	0	3	0
Career total			74	3	4	0	78	3
