= Houliston =

Houliston may refer to:

- Billy Houliston, Scottish footballer
- Houliston Glacier in Antarctica
