= Sandy Herd (footballer) =

Scottish footballer

Personal information
- Full name: Andrew Clark Herd
- Date of birth: 4 October 1903
- Place of birth: Auchterderran, Scotland
- Date of death: 1 December 1984 (aged 81)
- Place of death: Australia
- Height: 5 ft 11 in (1.80 m)
- Positions: Left half; fullback

Senior career*
Years	Team	Apps	(Gls)
1923–1924	Hearts of Beath		
1923–1924	Dundee	1	(0)
1924–1927	Dunfermline Athletic	103	(5)
1927–1937	Hearts	264	(7)
1937–1939	East Fife	46	(3)
Total		414	(13)

International career
1934	Scottish Football League XI	1	(0)
1935	Scotland	1	(0)
- * Club domestic league appearances and goals

Andrew Clark Herd (4 October 1903 – 1 December 1984) was a Scottish professional footballer.

A miner by trade, Herd started his senior career with Dundee, whom he joined from junior side Hearts of Beath, in 1923. He joined Dunfermline Athletic a year later, helping them to win the Division Two title in 1925–26. He was signed by Hearts in 1927 in a £250 transfer deal, with Colin Dand moving to Dunfermline as part of the agreement.

Herd spent ten seasons with the Tynecastle club, making 291 first team appearances in the process. Initially selected as a fullback, he switched to the left half position when Andy Anderson joined the club in 1929, and established himself in the latter role. His half-back combination with Alex Massie and John Johnston proved both durable and successful for Hearts, the trio proving a constant part of the side between 1930 and 1935, and eventually all three were called up to the Scotland national team. Herd's sole cap was earned against Ireland in 1935, while he also made one appearance for the Scottish Football League XI, against the (English) Football League XI in 1934.

In 1936, Herd was awarded a joint testimonial match, alongside Northern Irish centre half Willie Reid. Chelsea provided the opposition and Andy Black scored Hearts' goal in a 1–1 draw in front of 8,500 spectators. By now 34, Herd's career was considered to be drawing to a close and he was allowed to leave for Second Division East Fife at the end of the 1936–37 season.

Herd was to enjoy an Indian summer with the Methil side though, and in his first season with East Fife they remarkably reached the final of the Scottish Cup. Kilmarnock were their opponents at Hampden Park and the match was drawn 1–1 but Herd suffered an injury which would force him to miss the replay. His replacement John Harvey, loaned from Hearts for the occasion, helped the Fifers to a 4–2 victory, making them the first club from the Second Division to win the trophy. Although he missed the decisive match, Herd had played in every game of East Fife's cup run up to that point, notably scoring twice in their quarter-final defeat of Raith Rovers, and the club successfully petitioned the Scottish FA to allow him to receive a winner's medal.

Herd retired in 1939 and emigrated to Melbourne, Australia later that year. His younger brother Alec maintained the family's representation in the professional footballing ranks, playing for Manchester City and representing Scotland in several unofficial wartime internationals during World War II. Herd's nephew, Alec's son David, would also later represent Scotland.
