= George Ferguson (footballer, fl. 1946–1954) =

Scottish footballer

Personal information
- Full name: George Ferguson
- Position: Left back

Youth career
- St Anthonys

Senior career*
| Years | Team | Apps | (Gls) |
| 1946–1949 | Celtic | 5 | (0) |
| 1948–1954 | Dumbarton | 156 | (0) |
- * Club domestic league appearances and goals

George Ferguson was a Scottish football player during the 1940s and 1950s. He started his career with junior side St Anthonys before signing professionally with Celtic. After failing to hold down a regular spot in the Celtic team, he transferred to Dumbarton where he played with distinction, being a constant in the defence for six seasons.
