= Charles E. Scott =

American philosopher (1935–2026)

- Born: 1935
- Died: March 30, 2026 (aged 90)

Education
- Education: Yale University

Philosophical work
- Era: Contemporary philosophy
- Region: Western philosophy
- School: Continental philosophy
- Institutions: Pennsylvania State University; Vanderbilt University

Charles E. Scott (1935 – March 30, 2026) was an American philosopher who was Distinguished Professor of Philosophy Emeritus and Research Professor of Philosophy at Vanderbilt University. Previously, he was Edwin Erle Sparks Professor of Philosophy at Pennsylvania State University.

Scott died on March 30, 2026, aged 90.

== Books ==
- Living With Indifference, Indiana University Press, May 2007
- The Lives of Things, Indiana University Press, 2002
- The Time of Memory, SUNY Press, 1999
- On the Advantages and Disadvantages of Ethics and Politics, Indiana University Press, 1996
- The Question of Ethics, Indiana University Press, 1990
- The Language of Difference, Humanities International Press, 1987
- Boundaries in Mind: A Study of Immediate Awareness Based in Psychotherapy, Crossroad Publishing Co., 1982
