= Willie Walmsley =

Scottish footballer

William Walmsley
Personal information
- Full name: William Walmsley
- Date of birth: 18 November 1924
- Date of death: 3 September 2001 (aged 76)
- Place of death: Glasgow, Scotland
- Position: Outside left

Senior career*
Years	Team	Apps	(Gls)
1948–1950	Rangers	1	(0)
1948–1949	Dumbarton (loan)	1	(0)
1950–1951	Stenhousemuir	4	(0)
- * Club domestic league appearances and goals

William Walmsley (18 November 1924 – 3 September 2001) was a Scottish footballer who played for Rangers, Dumbarton and Stenhousemuir.
