= Broxburn United F.C. =

Former association football club in Scotland

Broxburn United
- Full name: Broxburn United Football Club
- Nickname: the United
- Founded: 1912
- Dissolved: 1932
- Ground: Sports Park, Broxburn
- League: Scottish Football League (1921–1926)
Home colours

Broxburn United Football Club was a football club based at Sports Park in Broxburn, West Lothian in Scotland. The club was formed by the amalgamation of the town's two senior clubs Broxburn and Broxburn Athletic in 1912, and was a member of the Scottish Football League from 1921 until 1926.

== History ==
Broxburn United was formed in April 1912 when it became clear that a small town like Broxburn could not support two senior sides. United became members of the Central Football League (apart from a spell in the Eastern Football League from 1915 to 1917) and along with much of the membership of this group they were admitted to the newly expanded Scottish Football League Second Division in 1921. Its greatest honour was winning the Penman Cup in 1914, beating East Stirlingshire 3–2 in the final at the Shire's Merchiston Park, with two goals from John Clark and one from James.

It appeared to be unrealistic for a town of just 3,000 people to sustain a league club, and although the club's first match in the SFL attracted a crowd of 3,500, an economic downturn meant that too many clubs were trying to attract too few spectators. Broxburn were censured in 1922 for fielding only two first team players in a league match against St Bernard's.

Stenhousemuir player Joe Shortt reported to the League that he had been offered £50 by the representatives of a bookmaker from Glasgow to play poorly in a match against Broxburn United.

The club struggled in the League and finished bottom in the 1925–26 season. Facing re-election, they were rejected in favour of Forfar Athletic and dropped out of the League. Broxburn United joined the Scottish Football Alliance for the 1926–27 season, but found this level to be too financially taxing and soon joined the ranks of Scottish junior football by joining the Midlothian Junior League. The club continued until 1932 when financial troubles finally claimed them.

== Colours ==
- 1912–1920: Black & white striped shirts, white shorts.
- 1920–1932: Maroon shirts, white shorts.

== Honours ==
- Penman Cup: 1913–14
