= George Drummond (Cowdenbeath footballer) =

Scottish footballer

Personal information
- Date of birth: c. 1872
- Place of birth: Scotland
- Date of death: August 1912 (aged 40)
- Place of death: Indiana, United States
- Position: Centre forward

Senior career*
Years	Team	Apps	(Gls)
1892–1895	Cowdenbeath		
–1896	Kirkcaldy		
1896–1897	Leith Athletic	26	(15)
1897	Cowdenbeath		
1897–	Raith Rovers		
1901–1902	Cowdenbeath		
–1907	Hearts of Beath		
- * Club domestic league appearances and goals

George Drummond was a Scottish footballer who played in the Scottish League for Leith Athletic as a centre forward.

== Personal life ==
Drummond's brother Jock and nephew Tom were both footballers for Cowdenbeath.

== Career statistics ==
Appearances and goals by club, season and competition
Club	Season	League			Scottish Cup		Total	
Club	Season	Division	Apps	Goals	Apps	Goals	Apps	Goals
Leith Athletic	1896–97	Scottish Second Division	13	10	4	2	17	12
Leith Athletic	1897–98	Scottish Second Division	13	5	2	1	15	6
Career total			26	15	6	3	32	18

== Honours ==
Hearts of Beath

- Wemyss Cup: 1906–07

Individual

- Cowdenbeath Hall of Fame
