= Penman Cup =

Defunct Scottish association football tournament

- Founded: 1905
- Abolished: 1963
- Region: Eastern Scotland
- Most championships: Raith Rovers (8 titles)

The Penman Cup was a Scottish association football knockout competition, played from 1906 to the 1960s.

== History ==
George Penman, a Fifeshire businessman and director of Cowdenbeath, created the trophy for clubs from the counties of Fifeshire, Stirlingshire, Clackmannanshire, and Linlithgowshire, and in the East of Scotland Football Association, as an extra attraction towards the end of football seasons. A number of clubs attended a meeting at the Union Hotel, Dunfermline, on Saturday 23 December 1905, to inaugurate the tournament; ultimately, 19 teams were accepted as entrants, West Calder and Berwick Rangers having their applications refused. The relevant associations (both national and local) gave their approval in February 1906 and the competition was hailed as being of near-equal importance to the Scottish Qualifying Cup.

Given the donor was from Cowdenbeath, the Miners' ground at North End Park was used as the venue for the initial final tie, and Raith Rovers took the first title, beating Alloa Athletic 3–1 on 12 May 1906, the match being defined by two penalties; Raith scored first from the spot, but Alloa missed one soon afterwards.

The First World War interrupted the competition; the 1914–15 final between East Stirlingshire and Alloa Athletic was never played, as the committee disqualified any club which had not played off its scheduled rounds by 1 May, which left only the Shire and Alloa, but the committee then fixed the final to take place in Falkirk on 1 May itself. This caused problems for the Shire, as the Stirlingshire Cup consolation final had been scheduled for the same day. Alloa refused consent to play on another date without a guarantee of travelling expenses, which was not forthcoming; the Cup was therefore held over to the following season, but the war prevented the final from being played off.

In 1917, with entries diminished due to the First World War, and the 1916–17 competition not finishing until February 1918, the committee invited clubs from Perthshire and Forfarshire to boost numbers. This invitation lasted until the 1937–38 season - that season St Johnstone did not enter, but Dundee and Dundee United were drawn together in the first round - when, following a complaint from Raith and East Fife, the Scottish Football Association ruled clubs from those counties could not compete. The Penman Cup committee altered its rules formally to allow clubs from the counties to fall within the competition's reach but it was to no avail as the Scottish FA doubled down on the ban, with Leith Athletic and St Bernards joining the competition in their stead.

After the Second World War, increased league commitments meant the competition often did not reach a conclusion. After the 1961–62 competition was not completed until October 1962 (and even then runner-up Stirling Albion fielded six reserves in the final), and the 1962–63 competition had only had three games played by May, the competition was abandoned, and the trophy used for Fifeshire juvenile teams.

== Finals ==
Penman Cup Finals
Season	Winner	Score	Runners Up	Venue
1905–06	Raith Rovers (1)	3–1	Alloa Athletic	North End Park
1906–07	Bathgate (1)	3–3, 3–2	Broxburn Athletic	North End Park, Boghead Park
1907–08	St Bernard's (1)	1–0	East Stirlingshire	Brockville Park
1908–09	Raith Rovers (2)	3–1	Alloa Athletic	North End Park
1909–10	East Fife (1)	1–1, 3–3. 2–1	Stenhousemuir	North End Park, Recreation Park, Brockville Park
1910–11	Cowdenbeath (1)	3–0	Dunfermline Athletic	North End Park
1911–12	Raith Rovers (3)	0–0, 4–1	East Fife	Stark's Park
1912–13	Armadale (1)	2–1	Cowdenbeath	North End Park
1913–14	Broxburn United (1)	3–2	East Stirlingshire	Merchiston Park
1914–15		unfinished		
1915–16	Cowdenbeath (2)	5–1	Bathgate	North End Park
1916–17	East Fife (2)	1–0	Armadale	North End Park
1917–18	Dundee (1)	2–0	Dundee Hibernian	Dens Park
1918–19		no competition		
1919–20	Cowdenbeath (3)	3–1	Dunfermline Athletic	Central Park
1920–21	Alloa Athletic (1)	2–0	Dundee Hibernian	East End Park
1921–22	Dundee (2)	3–1	Raith Rovers	Dens Park
1922–23	Raith Rovers (4)	1–0	Dundee	Stark's Park
1923–24	Raith Rovers (5)	3–2	St Johnstone	Stark's Park
1924–25		no competition		
1925–26	St Johnstone (1)	2–2, 3–1	Lochgelly United	East End Park, Muirton Park
1926–27	Alloa Athletic (2)	2–0	Raith Rovers	Stark's Park
1927–28		no competition		
1928–29	Dundee (3)	5–1	Dundee United	Dens Park
1929–30		unfinished		
1930–31		unfinished		
1931–32		unfinished		
1932–33		unfinished		
1933–34		unfinished		
1934–35		no competition		
1935–36		unfinished		
1936–37	Raith Rovers (6)	2–0	Alloa Athletic	Stark's Park
1937–38		unfinished		
1938–39	East Fife (3)	5–1	Stenhousemuir	Bayview Park
1939–40		unfinished		
1933–34		unfinished		
1940–45		no competition		
1945–46		unfinished		
1946–47		unfinished		
1947–48	Raith Rovers (7)	2–1	Heart of Midlothian	Tynecastle Park
1948–49		unfinished		
1949–50	Stirling Albion (1)	2–0	Leith Athletic	Annfield
1950–51		unfinished		
1951–52		unfinished		
1952–53		unfinished		
1953–54	Stenhousemuir (1)	4–2	Heart of Midlothian	Tynecastle Park
1954–55		unfinished		
1955–56		unfinished		
1956–57	Stirling Albion (2)	walkover	Alloa Athletic	
1957–58	Stirling Albion (3)	5–0	Raith Rovers	Annfield
1958–59	Raith Rovers (8)	5–2	East Stirlingshire	Stark's Park
1959–60	Dunfermline Athletic (1)	3–0	Stirling Albion	East End Park
1960–61		unfinished		
1961–62	East Fife (4)	3–1	Stirling Albion	Bayview Park
1962–63		unfinished		
