= Archie McIndewar =

Scottish footballer

Archibald McIndewar
Personal information
- Full name: Archibald McIndewar
- Date of birth: 26 July 1921
- Place of birth: Glasgow, Scotland
- Date of death: 13 October 2004 (aged 83)
- Place of death: Peterhead, Scotland
- Position: Goalkeeper

Senior career*
Years	Team	Apps	(Gls)
1946–1947	Queen's Park	0	(0)
1946–1950	Rangers	0	(0)
1948–1949	Dumbarton	7	(0)
1950–1951	Dundee United		
1951	Stirling Albion		
1951–1952	Workington	20	(0)
- * Club domestic league appearances and goals

Archibald McIndewar (26 July 1921 – 13 October 2004) was a Scottish footballer who played for Queen's Park, Rangers and Dumbarton.
