= Charles Scott (footballer) =

Scottish footballer (1885–1916)

Personal information
- Full name: Charles Penman Scott
- Date of birth: 1885
- Place of birth: Auchterderran, Scotland
- Date of death: 10 August 1916 (aged 30–31)
- Place of death: Somme, France
- Position: Outside right

Senior career*
Years	Team	Apps	(Gls)
–1905	Hearts of Beath		
1905–1910	Cowdenbeath	17	(1)
1907	East Fife		
- * Club domestic league appearances and goals

Charles Penman Scott (1885 – 10 August 1916) was a Scottish footballer who played in the Scottish League for Cowdenbeath as an outside right. He also played for Hearts of Beath and East Fife.

== Personal life ==
As of 1901, Scott was working as a miner and he later married and had three children. On 9 January 1915, five months after Britain's entry into the First World War, Scott enlisted as a private in the Princess Louise's (Argyll and Sutherland Highlanders). He was appointed lance corporal in November 1915 and was posted to the Western Front the following month, but he was quickly returned to Britain for a hernia operation. Scott returned to the front in March 1916 and was hospitalised with scabies two months later. After his recovery, Scott was killed in action on the Somme on 10 August 1916 and was buried in Gordon Dump Cemetery.

== Career statistics ==
Appearances and goals by club, season and competition
Club	Season	League			Scottish Cup		Total	
Club	Season	Division	Apps	Goals	Apps	Goals	Apps	Goals
Cowdenbeath	1905–06	Scottish Second Division	11	1	0	0	11	1
Cowdenbeath	1909–10	Scottish Second Division	6	0	0	0	6	0
Career total			17	1	0	0	17	1
