= Central Park, Cowdenbeath =

Stadium in Cowdenbeath, Scotland

Central Park
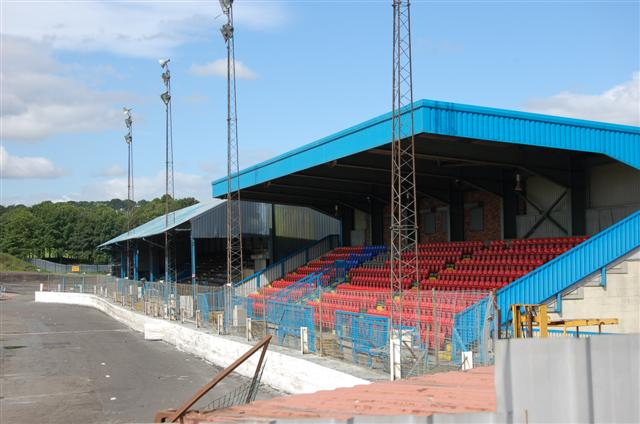
- Main Stand and Alex Menzies Stand

- Location in Fife
- Location: Cowdenbeath, Fife; KY4 9QQ
- Coordinates: 56°06′31.46″N 3°20′49.55″W
- Owner: Cowdenbeath F.C.
- Capacity: 4,309
- Surface: Grass

Construction
- Opened: 1917
- Renovated: 1995 (Alex Menzies Stand)

Tenant
- Cowdenbeath F.C.

Central Park also known as The Racewall is a multi-use stadium in Cowdenbeath, Fife, Scotland, used for football and stock car racing. It is situated in the centre of the town, just off the High Street, and has a capacity of 4,309. The pitch size is 107 x 66 yards. Central Park has been the home ground of Lowland League team Cowdenbeath F.C. since it opened in 1917. Stock car racing has taken place at the ground since 1970, and takes place on a tarmac racetrack surrounding the football pitch. Central Park was also previously a venue for greyhound racing between 1928 and 1965.

== History ==
Cowdenbeath F.C. played at Jubilee Park until 1888, and then at North End Park. The club moved to Central Park when it was opened in 1917. A main stand was built in 1921. A record crowd of 25,586 attended a Scottish League Cup tie against Rangers in 1949. Floodlights were first used in 1968, in a match against Celtic. Central Park was also used for greyhound racing and speedway. It became a stock car racing track in 1970, and has since hosted several world championships.

Half of the main stand was destroyed by a fire in 1992. The surviving section of this stand is called the West Stand, or the Old Stand. Beside this the 'Alex Menzies Stand' (or New Stand) was opened in March 1995, giving a total seated capacity of 1,622. Along with this the club built new dressing rooms, a board room, function suite, and office facilities. Both stands have a row of floodlight pylons in front of them, which can obstruct supporters views. Three sides of the ground are uncovered terraces.

== Greyhound racing ==
Greyhound racing around Central Park started on 7 July 1928. A 400-yard circumference track had an inside hare and both handicap and level start racing took place. It was an all grass track and distances raced were 289 and 489 yards. Greyhound racing ceased in 1965.

== Speedway ==
The stadium hosted motorcycle speedway during 1965 and 1966, and most notably held a preliminary round of the Speedway World Championship on 26 May 1965.

== Future ==
In 2011, there were plans for Cowdenbeath to move to a new stadium, to be located on the outskirts of Cowdenbeath.

== Transport ==
Cowdenbeath railway station is five minutes' walk from Central Park. The M90 motorway passes near Cowdenbeath, with Central Park reached by leaving the motorway at junction 3, taking the A92 for Kirkcaldy. The A909 road then leads into Cowdenbeath and free car parking is provided at the ground.
