= John Crichton-Stuart =

John Crichton-Stuart may refer to:

- John Crichton-Stuart, 2nd Marquess of Bute (1793–1848)
- John Crichton-Stuart, 3rd Marquess of Bute (1847–1900)
- John Crichton-Stuart, 4th Marquess of Bute (1881–1947)
- John Crichton-Stuart, 5th Marquess of Bute (1907–1956)
- John Crichton-Stuart, 6th Marquess of Bute (1933–1993)
- John Crichton-Stuart, 7th Marquess of Bute (1958–2021)
