= Matt Lynch (footballer) =

Scottish footballer

Matthew Lynch
Personal information
- Full name: Matthew Lynch
- Date of birth: 29 November 1916
- Date of death: 3 September 1999 (aged 82)
- Position: Right half

Youth career
- St Anthonys

Senior career*
Years	Team	Apps	(Gls)
1937–1948	Celtic	44	(2)
1948–1949	Dumbarton	24	(2)
- * Club domestic league appearances and goals

Matthew Lynch (29 November 1916 – 3 September 1999) was a Scottish footballer who played for Celtic and Dumbarton.
