= Chris McNee =

Scottish footballer

Personal information
- Full name: Christopher Mel McNee
- Date of birth: 1914
- Place of birth: Govanhill, Scotland
- Date of death: 1986 (aged 71–72)
- Place of death: Glasgow, Scotland
- Position: Outside left

Senior career*
Years	Team	Apps	(Gls)
–	Blantyre Victoria		
1936–1939	Hamilton Academical	100	(23)
1939–1948	Rangers	10	(3)
1948–1949	Dumbarton	8	(0)
Total		118	(26)

International career
1937–1939	Scottish League XI	2	(0)
- * Club domestic league appearances and goals

Christopher Mel McNee (1914–1986) was a Scottish footballer who played as an outside left for Hamilton Academical, Rangers and Dumbarton.

He was signed by Accies from the Junior grade as a replacement for Bobby Reid and quickly impressed with his performances, being selected twice for the Scottish Football League XI in 1937 and 1939.

In 1939 he moved to Rangers and was contracted to the club for the next nine years, but the outbreak of World War II meant the four league matches he played to that point were declared void, and he also sustained a broken leg the following year. He served in the Royal Air Force during the conflict, also making wartime appearances for Burnley and Wrexham. McNee returned to Rangers and was a member of the squad which won the league title in 1946–47, with his ten appearances and three goals entitling him to a medal (they also won the Scottish League Cup, but he played no part in the run). By now in his mid-30s, McNee transferred to Dumbarton for a year in 1948 before being released.
