= Charles Bootland =

Scottish footballer (1916–1981)

Personal information
- Full name: Charles Vere Ferrers Townshend Bootland
- Date of birth: 17 April 1916
- Place of birth: Leith, Scotland
- Date of death: 1981 (aged 64)
- Place of death: Leith, Scotland
- Position: Outside left

Senior career*
Years	Team	Apps	(Gls)
1946–1949	Dumbarton	48	(22)
1948–1950	Clyde	18	(6)
1950–1952	Kilmarnock	13	(3)
- * Club domestic league appearances and goals

Charles Vere Ferrers Townshend Bootland (17 April 1916 – 1981) was a Scottish footballer who played for Dumbarton, Clyde and Kilmarnock.

Bootland died in Leith in 1981, at the age of 64.
