= Hugh Long (footballer) =

Scottish footballer

Hugh Bradley Long (3 January 1923 – 6 December 1988) was a Scottish footballer, who played as a left winger for Celtic, Clyde and Worcester City. Long represented Scotland once, in a 1946–47 British Home Championship match against Ireland.

Long died in Glasgow in 1988 at the age of 65.
