= George Paton (footballer) =

Scottish footballer

Personal information
- Full name: George Paton
- Position: Goalkeeper

Youth career
- Yoker Athletic

Senior career*
Years	Team	Apps	(Gls)
1947–1948	Hearts	3	(0)
1948–1953	Dumbarton	107	(0)
- * Club domestic league appearances and goals

George Paton was a Scottish football player during the 1940s and 1950s. He started his career with junior side Yoker Athletic before signing professionally with Hearts. He shortly thereafter transferred to Dumbarton where he played with distinction, being a constant in the goalkeeping position for over five seasons.
