= Archie Wright =

Scottish footballer and manager

Personal information
- Full name: Archibald Watson Wright
- Date of birth: 23 November 1924
- Place of birth: Glasgow, Scotland
- Date of death: 30 April 1990 (aged 65)
- Place of death: Airdrie, Scotland
- Position: Inside forward

Youth career
- Rutherglen Glencairn

Senior career*
Years	Team	Apps	(Gls)
1947?–1948	Hamilton Academical	28	(9)
1948–1950?	Clyde	32	(13)
1950?–1951?	Falkirk	34	(7)
1951?–1953?	Blackburn	22	(10)
1953–1954	Grimsby Town	39	(9)
1954–1957?	Accrington Stanley	80	(27)
Total		235	(75)

Managerial career
- 1963–1967: Airdrieonians
- 1967: Clyde
- * Club domestic league appearances and goals

Archibald Watson Wright (23 November 1924 – 30 April 1990) was a Scottish footballer who played as an inside forward. During his career, he played for Hamilton Academical, Clyde, Falkirk, Blackburn Rovers, Grimsby Town, and Accrington Stanley.

Wright was signed for a small fee by then Grimsby Town manager Bill Shankly in 1953.

He later became manager of Airdrieonians, and was in charge of the club as of December 1964.
