= West Calder Swifts F.C. =

Association football club in Scotland

West Calder Swifts
- Full name: West Calder Swifts Football Club
- Nickname: the Swifts
- Founded: 1903
- Dissolved: 1915
- Ground: Burngrange Park
- Trainer: David Bowman
Home colours

West Calder Swifts Football Club was a Scottish senior football club from the town of West Calder, Midlothian.

== History ==
The club was founded in May 1903, as a merger between West Calder and Mossend Swifts; although the name was a merger of the two teams' names, the combined club played at West Calder's ground, wearing West Calder's kit. The club's trainer however was the Mossend Swifts trainer David Bowman, who finished with 23 years' service at both sides.

The club's natural home would have been in the Central Combination, but that had collapsed at the end of the 1902–03 season, and a new league - the Midland League was set up. The Swifts were invited to become founder members, and the club's Andrew Russell was elected as the league's first president. However the competition did not complete its first season, with the Swifts heading for a mid-table finish.

=== Scottish Cup entries ===
The club was a consistent entrant to the Scottish Cup, although by 1903 the Scottish Football Association had introduced the Qualifying Cup as a series of preliminary rounds. The club's first entry in 1903–04 saw it reach the fifth round of the Qualifying Cup, entitling it to an entry into the Cup proper. In that first round, the club was drawn away to Scottish League side St Bernards of Edinburgh; the club rewarded the supporters who came to the match on a special train by recording a 1–1 draw, West Calder losing in a second replay at the neutral Mill Park in Bathgate.

The only other time the club won through to the proper rounds was in 1908–09, again having reached the fifth round of the Qualifying Cup. The club drew 0–0 in the first round at home to Partick Thistle. At the time, the Maryhill club was "between grounds", and therefore applied to the Scottish FA to have the replay at a neutral ground, on the basis that Burngrange Park's facilities were not up to scratch. On a vote of 13 to 10, the Scottish FA ordered the tie to take place at Shawfield. The Swifts appealed to the Scottish FA that Partick, without having a registered ground, was not entitled to ask for the match to be held on a neutral venue, and refused to play at Shawfield. As a result of this "foolish course", the tie was awarded to Partick. Thistle claimed expenses of £46 7s against West Calder, but that was dismissed, on the basis that Partick had caused the problems by having no ground.

=== King Cup entries ===
The main local competition for the club was the King Cup, for members of the East of Scotland FA. The club first entered in 1903–04; its second round tie with Bathgate ended in farce, when a mist descended, so the clubs agreed to play the match out as a friendly, which was then abandoned after a fight broke out. Bathgate eventually won through and beat the Swifts in the final at Uphall in 1904–05.

The club was also runner-up in 1907–08, losing to Peebles Rovers in the final at Tynecastle Park in front of 1,300 spectators; the Swifts' "rough play" had "alienated any sympathy an impartial spectator might have had for them". The club finally won the trophy in its last final, in 1909–10, and did so "in handsome fashion", hammering Gala Fairydean 6–0. Fairydean protested about the eligibility of one of the Swifts' players, but the East of Scotland FA dismissed it unanimously.

=== Last league action and end of the club ===
The club did not play in another league until 1910–11, when it joined the Scottish Football Union. The club struggled in a league of sufficient strength that the other 9 members were all Scottish League clubs past or future; it won only 3 matches and was only out-performing Broxburn when the season ran out of steam. The club joined an attempted revival of the Eastern League in 1912–13 but only played 5 matches.

The club was defunct by the 1913–14 season, losing players to new Junior sides, and having to scratch from the first round of the Scottish Qualifying Cup as the club's financial state (despite its amateur status) made it unable to raise a team; an attempt to revive the club in 1914–15 was only briefly successful, it proving impossible to raise a team to play fixtures during World War 1, although it did play one last Cup tie - a 3–1 defeat at Burngrange to Armadale. The club did not re-start after the war.

== Colours ==
The club played in red and black stripes.

== Ground ==
The Swifts' ground was Burngrange Park. The facilities were spartan, lacking large dressing rooms, so clubs had to change in the pavilion or in a nearby hotel. Violence against Broxburn Athletic F.C. officials in 1908 resulted in the ground being closed for a month.

== Notable players ==
- Patrick Slavin, former Celtic player, finished his career playing for the Swifts
- Archie Boyd, Heart of Midlothian F.C. goalkeeper, who played for the Swifts before joining Bo'ness F.C.
