= Jimmy Mason (footballer, born 1919) =

Scottish footballer

Personal information
- Full name: James Mason
- Date of birth: 18 June 1919
- Place of birth: Glasgow, Scotland
- Date of death: 4 December 1971 (aged 52)
- Place of death: Prestwick, Scotland
- Height: 5 ft 7 in (1.70 m)
- Position: Inside forward

Youth career
- Mossvale YMCA

Senior career*
Years	Team	Apps	(Gls)
1936–1952	Third Lanark	207	(34)

International career
1949–1951	Scotland	7	(4)
1948–1950	Scottish League XI	7	(0)
- * Club domestic league appearances and goals

James Mason (18 June 1919 – 4 December 1971) was a Scottish footballer, who played for Third Lanark and the Scotland national team.

An inside forward raised in the Dennistoun area of Glasgow, Mason played for the now defunct Third Lanark between 1936 and 1952, where he earned selection for the Scottish League representative side on seven occasions. During the Second World War he "guested" for Charlton Athletic, Portsmouth and Brentford while stationed in southern England. He also won 7 caps for the Scotland national team, scoring 4 goals.

He received a testimonial match in 1953, in which a Scotland XI defeated Sunderland. After his retirement he became a publican in the Bridgeton district of Glasgow.

== See also ==
- List of one-club men in association football
