= Johnny Crichton =

Scottish footballer (1925–2002)

John Crichton
Personal information
- Full name: John David Grey Crichton
- Date of birth: 8 April 1925
- Place of birth: Glasgow, Scotland
- Date of death: 2002 (aged 76)
- Place of death: Leith, Scotland
- Position: Forward

Senior career*
Years	Team	Apps	(Gls)
1947–1948	Morton	5	(0)
1948–1949	Dumbarton	4	(2)
1949–1951	Airdrie	8	(2)
- * Club domestic league appearances and goals

John David Grey Crichton (8 April 1925 – 2002) was a Scottish footballer who played for Morton, Dumbarton and Airdrie.

Crichton died in Leith in 2002, at the age of 76.
