= 1948–49 Scottish Division A =

43rd season of top-tier football league in Scotland

Scottish Division A
- Season: 1948–49
- Champions: Rangers
- Relegated: Morton; Albion Rovers

The 1948–49 Scottish Division A was won by Rangers by one point over nearest rival Dundee.

The league was won on the last day of the season. Dundee, being one point ahead of Rangers, would have secured the title with a win away at Falkirk F.C., but were defeated 4-1 while Rangers won 1-4 away at Albion Rovers.

Morton and Albion Rovers finished 15th and 16th respectively and were relegated to the 1949–50 Scottish Division B.

Rangers also won both the Scottish Cup and the Scottish League Cup, the first time a club claimed the national 'treble'.

== League table ==
Pos	Team	Pld	W	D	L	GF	GA	GD	Pts
1	Rangers	30	20	6	4	63	32	+31	46
2	Dundee	30	20	5	5	71	48	+23	45
3	Hibernian	30	17	5	8	75	52	+23	39
4	East Fife	30	16	3	11	64	46	+18	35
5	Falkirk	30	12	8	10	70	54	+16	32
6	Celtic	30	12	7	11	48	40	+8	31
7	Third Lanark	30	13	5	12	56	52	+4	31
8	Heart of Midlothian	30	12	6	12	64	54	+10	30
9	St Mirren	30	13	4	13	51	47	+4	30
10	Queen of the South	30	11	8	11	47	53	−6	30
11	Partick Thistle	30	9	9	12	50	63	−13	27
12	Motherwell	30	10	5	15	44	49	−5	25
13	Aberdeen	30	7	11	12	39	48	−9	25
14	Clyde	30	9	6	15	50	67	−17	24
15	Morton	30	7	8	15	39	51	−12	22
16	Albion Rovers	30	3	2	25	30	105	−75	8

Source: RSSSF

== Results ==
Home \ Away	ABE	ALB	CEL	CLY	DND	EFI	FAL	HOM	HIB	MOR	MOT	PAR	QOS	RAN	STM	THI
Aberdeen		4–0	1–0	4–4	1–3	3–1	1–4	2–2	1–2	0–0	2–0	4–2	1–2	0–2	0–2	2–2
Albion Rovers	2–1		3–3	1–2	0–6	0–3	2–0	1–5	0–3	2–1	1–3	2–3	1–3	1–4	1–2	1–5
Celtic	3–0	3–0		2–1	0–1	0–1	4–4	2–0	1–2	0–0	3–2	3–0	2–2	0–1	2–1	1–2
Clyde	0–0	1–0	0–4		3–3	2–4	3–3	3–3	3–5	0–3	1–0	0–1	4–0	1–3	4–1	2–0
Dundee	3–0	5–0	3–2	3–1		2–5	3–1	2–1	4–3	3–1	2–1	4–2	2–1	3–1	1–0	1–1
East Fife	1–4	5–1	3–2	1–2	3–0		1–1	5–1	2–3	3–1	0–1	2–0	4–0	1–2	3–1	4–0
Falkirk	1–2	7–1	1–1	3–2	4–1	1–2		5–3	1–1	5–1	3–0	1–3	3–2	2–2	2–1	5–1
Heart of Midlothian	1–1	7–1	1–2	3–0	0–1	4–0	3–1		3–2	2–4	5–1	1–3	1–1	2–0	1–3	3–2
Hibernian	4–1	4–4	1–2	3–0	2–1	5–2	2–0	3–1		3–4	5–1	2–1	1–1	0–1	1–1	1–0
Morton	1–1	3–0	0–0	2–2	2–2	2–0	0–1	0–2	2–3		1–1	2–1	2–1	0–1	1–4	3–3
Motherwell	1–1	5–1	0–1	2–3	0–2	1–2	0–3	3–0	5–1	1–0		3–1	2–3	1–1	4–1	1–0
Partick Thistle	0–0	3–0	1–2	3–2	4–4	0–0	3–3	1–1	2–6	1–0	1–1		1–1	1–1	3–0	1–3
Queen of the South	0–0	4–0	1–0	4–1	0–1	0–3	0–0	1–4	1–1	2–1	2–1	8–2		0–2	3–2	2–1
Rangers	1–1	3–1	4–0	4–1	1–1	3–1	4–3	2–1	2–4	4–0	2–0	2–2	3–0		2–1	2–1
St Mirren	3–1	3–2	1–1	2–1	6–1	2–0	2–0	1–2	2–0	2–1	0–0	4–2	1–1	0–2		1–2
Third Lanark	1–0	4–1	3–2	0–1	2–3	2–2	3–2	1–1	3–2	1–0	1–3	1–2	6–1	2–1	3–1	

Legend: Blue = home team win; Yellow = draw; Red = away team win.
