= 1947–48 Scottish Division A =

42nd season of top-tier football league in Scotland

Scottish Division A
- Season: 1947–48
- Champions: Hibernian
- Relegated: Airdrieonians; Queens Park

The 1947–48 Scottish Division A was won by Hibernian. Airdrieonians and Queen's Park finished 15th and 16th respectively and were relegated to the 1948–49 Scottish Division B.

== League table ==
Pos	Team	Pld	W	D	L	GF	GA	GD	Pts
1	Hibernian	30	22	4	4	85	26	+59	48
2	Rangers	30	21	4	5	92	20	+72	46
3	Partick Thistle	30	16	4	10	61	42	+19	36
4	Dundee	30	15	3	12	67	51	+16	33
5	St Mirren	30	13	5	12	54	58	−4	31
6	Clyde	30	12	7	11	52	57	−5	31
7	Falkirk	30	10	10	10	55	48	+7	30
8	Motherwell	30	13	3	14	45	47	−2	29
9	Heart of Midlothian	30	10	8	12	37	42	−5	28
10	Aberdeen	30	10	7	13	45	45	0	27
11	Third Lanark	30	10	6	14	56	73	−17	26
12	Celtic	30	10	5	15	41	56	−15	25
13	Queen of the South	30	10	5	15	49	74	−25	25
14	Morton	30	9	6	15	47	43	+4	24
15	Airdrieonians	30	7	7	16	40	78	−38	21
16	Queens Park	30	9	2	19	45	75	−30	20

Source: SPFL

== Results ==
Home \ Away	ABE	AIR	CEL	CLY	DND	FAL	HOM	HIB	MOR	MOT	PAR	QOS	QPA	RAN	STM	THI
Aberdeen		3–0	2–0	3–1	3–2	1–2	1–1	0–2	2–1	2–1	0–1	2–2	6–0	1–1	5–0	2–2
Airdrieonians	2–1		3–2	1–3	2–0	3–1	1–1	0–3	0–3	1–5	1–0	6–1	2–5	1–2	1–4	2–1
Celtic	1–0	0–0		0–0	1–1	0–3	4–2	2–4	3–2	0–1	1–2	4–3	4–0	0–4	0–0	1–3
Clyde	1–3	5–1	2–0		1–4	1–1	2–1	2–2	3–2	3–2	2–4	5–2	2–0	1–2	3–2	1–1
Dundee	0–0	6–0	2–3	7–0		4–0	2–1	3–1	0–4	2–0	2–2	1–0	2–1	1–3	6–1	5–2
Falkirk	3–1	0–0	0–1	1–1	3–2		0–2	3–1	4–1	2–2	1–3	1–1	3–0	1–5	1–1	8–1
Heart of Midlothian	1–1	2–2	1–0	1–1	0–1	3–2		2–1	3–0	0–1	1–2	1–0	1–0	1–2	3–2	1–3
Hibernian	4–0	7–1	1–1	2–1	2–1	2–0	3–1		1–1	5–0	1–0	6–0	4–0	1–0	5–0	8–0
Morton	0–1	1–1	4–0	0–1	3–0	2–1	1–1	1–2		2–3	0–2	0–1	0–1	0–1	2–2	2–2
Motherwell	2–1	2–0	0–3	4–1	0–2	0–0	3–1	0–2	0–1		2–0	3–1	0–2	1–1	0–1	2–1
Partick Thistle	2–1	8–2	3–5	1–2	6–2	0–2	1–1	1–1	1–2	2–1		4–0	5–1	0–1	3–1	2–2
Queen of the South	0–0	3–3	2–0	3–0	5–2	6–6	0–1	0–3	4–3	3–0	0–1		3–1	0–3	2–3	2–1
Queen's Park	3–1	2–1	3–2	2–4	0–1	1–4	0–0	2–3	0–3	2–5	1–2	7–0		1–4	3–0	2–2
Rangers	4–0	3–0	2–0	2–1	2–1	1–1	1–2	2–1	1–1	2–0	2–1	2–3	1–2		3–2	5–2
St Mirren	3–0	2–1	1–2	1–1	4–1	1–1	1–0	2–4	0–4	4–2	3–1	0–1	6–1	2–1		1–0
Third Lanark	3–2	2–2	5–1	2–1	1–4	2–0	4–1	1–4	2–1	0–3	1–2	5–1	4–2	0–1	1–4	

Legend: Blue = home team win; Yellow = draw; Red = away team win.
