= Alex Menzies (midfielder) =

Scottish footballer

Personal information
- Place of birth: Cowdenbeath, Scotland
- Position: Wing half

Youth career
- Thorntree United

Senior career*
Years	Team	Apps	(Gls)
1947–1948	Dumbarton	29	(0)
1948–1955	Cowdenbeath	174	(4)
1955–1957	St Johnstone	49	(5)
1957–1959	Stirling Albion	51	(0)
1959–1960	Alloa Athletic	28	(0)
- * Club domestic league appearances and goals

Alex "Big Ming" Menzies was a Scottish professional footballer, who played for Cowdenbeath and Stirling Albion amongst others.

A former coal-miner, (Ferguson 2006) Menzies joined Cowdenbeath, his hometown club, in 1948. Menzies, a tough-tackling wing half was a member of the side that took Rangers to the brink of defeat over a two-legged Scottish League Cup tie in September 1949. The late Harry Ewing said that "If you cut Ming in half, like a stick of Blackpool Rock he would have Cowdenbeath printed around his waist.". After his death in 1990, Ewing recommended Cowdenbeath's new stand be named "The Alex Menzies Stand", a suggestion that was adopted by the board.

Everyone in Cowdenbeath knew Big Ming. He belonged to the Desperate Dan school of Scottish footballing manhood – Ron Ferguson

== Bibliography ==
- Ferguson, R Black Diamonds and the Blue Brazil, 1993 Aberdeen, Northern Books for Famedram ISBN 978-0-905489-53-7
- Ferguson, R Helicopter Dreams, 2006 Aberdeen Northern ISBN 978-0-905489-86-5
