= 1949–50 Scottish Division A =

44th season of top-tier football league in Scotland

Scottish Division A
- Season: 1949–50
- Champions: Rangers
- Relegated: Queen of the South; Stirling Albion

The 1949–50 Scottish Division A was won by Rangers by one point over nearest rival Hibernian. Queen of the South and Stirling Albion finished 15th and 16th respectively and were relegated to the 1950–51 Scottish Division B.

Rangers won the league with a 2–2 draw in their last match, away to Third Lanark, a game in which Rangers took a 2–0 lead before Thirds fought back to 2–2. Another goal for Third Lanark would have handed the title to Hibernian. A few days previously, Rangers had drawn 0–0 with Hibs at Ibrox before a crowd of 101,000, the largest crowd to watch a League match in Britain since the war, a record that still stands. Had Hibs won this match they would have become champions.

== League table ==
Pos	Team	Pld	W	D	L	GF	GA	GD	Pts
1	Rangers	30	22	6	2	58	26	+32	50
2	Hibernian	30	22	5	3	86	34	+52	49
3	Hearts	30	20	3	7	86	40	+46	43
4	East Fife	30	15	7	8	58	43	+15	37
5	Celtic	30	14	7	9	51	50	+1	35
6	Dundee	30	12	7	11	49	46	+3	31
7	Partick Thistle	30	13	3	14	55	45	+10	29
8	Aberdeen	30	11	4	15	48	56	−8	26
9	Raith Rovers	30	9	8	13	45	54	−9	26
10	Motherwell	30	10	5	15	53	58	−5	25
11	St Mirren	30	8	9	13	42	49	−7	25
12	Third Lanark	30	11	3	16	44	62	−18	25
13	Clyde	30	10	4	16	56	73	−17	24
14	Falkirk	30	7	10	13	48	72	−24	24
15	Queen of the South	30	5	6	19	31	63	−32	16
16	Stirling Albion	30	6	3	21	38	77	−39	15

Source: RSSSF

== Results ==
Home \ Away	ABE	CEL	CLY	DND	EFI	FAL	HOM	HIB	MOT	PAR	QOS	RAI	RAN	STM	STI	THI
Aberdeen		4–0	1–1	2–2	1–2	1–2	0–5	0–3	5–0	3–1	2–0	3–0	1–3	2–3	6–2	2–1
Celtic	4–2		4–1	2–0	4–1	4–3	3–2	2–2	3–1	1–0	3–0	2–2	1–1	0–0	2–1	2–1
Clyde	0–1	2–2		1–0	0–1	2–2	3–4	0–1	1–0	4–1	3–2	1–1	1–2	2–0	6–0	0–2
Dundee	1–1	3–0	2–3		1–0	2–0	3–1	1–2	3–1	1–0	3–0	2–1	0–1	2–0	4–1	1–4
East Fife	3–1	5–1	4–1	1–0		1–2	0–1	1–1	2–1	1–1	4–1	3–0	0–2	3–3	0–2	3–1
Falkirk	1–0	1–1	7–4	2–2	0–2		1–1	1–2	2–4	0–3	3–3	1–1	0–2	2–2	1–1	2–1
Heart of Midlothian	4–1	4–2	6–2	6–2	0–1	9–0		5–2	2–0	3–3	3–0	2–0	0–1	5–0	5–2	1–0
Hibernian	2–0	4–1	6–3	4–2	4–1	5–1	1–2		6–1	2–0	2–0	4–2	1–0	5–0	4–1	0–1
Motherwell	5–1	1–2	5–2	0–2	3–4	2–2	2–3	1–3		0–2	1–0	1–1	4–0	2–2	2–1	4–0
Partick Thistle	0–2	1–0	1–0	2–3	1–2	3–1	0–1	2–2	0–2		5–2	1–0	1–3	4–0	4–1	5–1
Queen of the South	1–0	0–2	2–3	1–1	0–5	2–2	0–4	2–2	2–0	3–1		0–0	1–2	1–1	3–1	4–1
Raith Rovers	1–2	1–1	7–1	4–1	4–4	6–4	2–0	0–6	0–2	1–3	2–0		1–3	2–1	2–0	1–1
Rangers	2–2	4–0	5–4	2–2	2–2	3–0	1–0	0–0	2–0	2–0	1–0	2–0		1–0	2–1	3–1
St Mirren	4–0	0–1	2–0	1–1	0–0	0–1	3–3	1–3	1–1	0–2	3–0	2–0	1–2		2–0	6–1
Stirling Albion	0–1	2–1	1–2	2–2	1–1	3–2	2–4	3–5	1–4	2–1	1–0	1–2	0–2	1–3		0–2
Third Lanark	3–1	1–0	1–3	1–0	4–1	0–2	3–0	0–2	3–3	2–7	2–1	0–1	2–2	2–1	2–4	

Legend: Blue = home team win; Yellow = draw; Red = away team win.
