= 1949–50 Scottish Division B =

Scottish Division B
- Season: 1949–50
- Champions: Morton
- Promoted: Morton; Airdrieonians

The 1949–50 Scottish Division B was won by Morton who, along with second placed Airdrieonians, were promoted to Division A. Alloa Athletic finished bottom.

== Table ==
Pos	Team	Pld	W	D	L	GF	GA	GD	Pts	Promotion or relegation
1	Morton	30	20	7	3	77	33	+44	47	Promotion to the 1950–51 Division A
2	Airdrieonians	30	19	6	5	79	40	+39	44	Promotion to the 1950–51 Division A
3	Dunfermline Athletic	30	16	4	10	71	57	+14	36	
4	St Johnstone	30	15	6	9	64	56	+8	36	
5	Cowdenbeath	30	16	3	11	63	56	+7	35	
6	Hamilton Academical	30	14	6	10	57	44	+13	34	
7	Dundee United	30	14	5	11	74	56	+18	33	
8	Kilmarnock	30	14	5	11	50	43	+7	33	
9	Queen's Park	30	12	7	11	63	59	+4	31	
10	Forfar Athletic	30	11	8	11	53	56	−3	30	
11	Albion Rovers	30	10	7	13	49	61	−12	27	
12	Stenhousemuir	30	8	8	14	54	72	−18	24	
13	Ayr United	30	8	6	16	53	80	−27	22	
14	Arbroath	30	5	9	16	47	69	−22	19	
15	Dumbarton	30	6	4	20	39	62	−23	16	
16	Alloa Athletic	30	5	3	22	47	96	−49	13	

Source: "1949-1950 Division B - SPFL Archive". SPFL.
