= 1948–49 Scottish League Cup =

Tournament details
- Country: Scotland

Final positions
- Champions: Rangers
- Runners-up: Raith Rovers

The 1948–49 Scottish League Cup was the third season of Scotland's second football knockout competition. The competition was won by Rangers, who defeated Raith Rovers in the final.

Rangers also won both the Scottish Football League and the Scottish Cup, the first time a club claimed the national 'treble'.

== First round ==
=== Group 1 ===
Team	Pld	W	D	L	GF	GA	GR	Pts
Rangers	6	3	2	1	8	6	1.333	8
Hibernian	6	3	1	2	12	5	2.400	7
Celtic	6	3	0	3	12	13	0.923	6
Clyde	6	1	1	4	9	17	0.529	3

Home team	Score	Away team	Date
Celtic	1–0	Hibernian	11 September 1948
Rangers	1–1	Clyde	11 September 1948
Clyde	0–2	Celtic	18 September 1948
Hibernian	0–0	Rangers	18 September 1948
Celtic	3–1	Rangers	25 September 1948
Hibernian	4–0	Clyde	25 September 1948
Clyde	1–3	Rangers	2 October 1948
Hibernian	4–2	Celtic	2 October 1948
Celtic	3–6	Clyde	9 October 1948
Rangers	1–0	Hibernian	9 October 1948
Clyde	1–4	Hibernian	16 October 1948
Rangers	2–1	Celtic	16 October 1948

=== Group 2 ===
Team	Pld	W	D	L	GF	GA	GR	Pts
Dundee	6	5	0	1	13	8	1.625	10
Motherwell	6	4	0	2	11	5	2.200	8
Falkirk	6	2	0	4	8	11	0.727	4
Albion Rovers	6	1	0	5	9	17	0.529	2

Home team	Score	Away team	Date
Dundee	2–1	Albion Rovers	11 September 1948
Motherwell	1–0	Falkirk	11 September 1948
Albion Rovers	0–1	Motherwell	18 September 1948
Falkirk	2–3	Dundee	18 September 1948
Falkirk	2–1	Albion Rovers	25 September 1948
Motherwell	0–1	Dundee	25 September 1948
Albion Rovers	2–3	Dundee	2 October 1948
Falkirk	1–0	Motherwell	2 October 1948
Dundee	4–2	Falkirk	9 October 1948
Motherwell	8–3	Albion Rovers	9 October 1948
Albion Rovers	2–1	Falkirk	16 October 1948
Dundee	0–1	Motherwell	16 October 1948

=== Group 3 ===
Team	Pld	W	D	L	GF	GA	GR	Pts
East Fife	6	5	0	1	20	9	2.222	10
Heart of Midlothian	6	3	1	2	16	12	1.333	7
Partick Thistle	6	2	1	3	18	14	1.286	5
Queen of the South	6	1	0	5	6	25	0.240	2

Home team	Score	Away team	Date
Heart of Midlothian	2–2	Partick Thistle	11 September 1948
Queen of the South	0–4	East Fife	11 September 1948
East Fife	4–0	Heart of Midlothian	18 September 1948
Partick Thistle	9–0	Queen of the South	18 September 1948
Partick Thistle	2–5	East Fife	25 September 1948
Queen of the South	2–3	Heart of Midlothian	25 September 1948
East Fife	3–1	Queen of the South	2 October 1948
Partick Thistle	3–1	Heart of Midlothian	2 October 1948
Heart of Midlothian	6–1	East Fife	9 October 1948
Queen of the South	3–2	Partick Thistle	9 October 1948
East Fife	3–0	Partick Thistle	16 October 1948
Heart of Midlothian	4–0	Queen of the South	16 October 1948

=== Group 4 ===
Team	Pld	W	D	L	GF	GA	GR	Pts
St Mirren	6	2	2	2	12	9	1.333	6
Aberdeen	6	2	2	2	11	11	1.000	6
Third Lanark	6	2	2	2	12	13	0.923	6
Morton	6	2	2	2	9	11	0.818	6

Home team	Score	Away team	Date
Aberdeen	3–1	St Mirren	11 September 1948
Morton	2–1	Third Lanark	11 September 1948
St Mirren	1–1	Morton	18 September 1948
Third Lanark	1–1	Aberdeen	18 September 1948
Aberdeen	3–1	Morton	25 September 1948
St Mirren	4–0	Third Lanark	25 September 1948
St Mirren	1–1	Aberdeen	2 October 1948
Third Lanark	2–2	Morton	2 October 1948
Aberdeen	2–4	Third Lanark	9 October 1948
Morton	0–3	St Mirren	9 October 1948
Morton	3–1	Aberdeen	16 October 1948
Third Lanark	4–2	St Mirren	16 October 1948

=== Group 5 ===
Team	Pld	W	D	L	GF	GA	GR	Pts
Raith Rovers	6	4	1	1	24	8	3.000	9
Dunfermline Athletic	6	3	1	2	11	9	1.222	7
Stirling Albion	6	2	2	2	16	22	0.727	6
Cowdenbeath	6	0	2	4	10	22	0.455	2

Home team	Score	Away team	Date
Dunfermline Athletic	1–1	Stirling Albion	11 September 1948
Raith Rovers	3–3	Cowdenbeath	11 September 1948
Cowdenbeath	0–2	Dunfermline Athletic	18 September 1948
Stirling Albion	1–7	Raith Rovers	18 September 1948
Cowdenbeath	3–3	Dunfermline Athletic	25 September 1948
Raith Rovers	2–1	Dunfermline Athletic	25 September 1948
Cowdenbeath	0–6	Raith Rovers	2 October 1948
Stirling Albion	4–3	Dunfermline Athletic	2 October 1948
Dunfermline Athletic	3–2	Cowdenbeath	9 October 1948
Raith Rovers	6–2	Stirling Albion	9 October 1948
Dunfermline Athletic	1–0	Raith Rovers	16 October 1948
Stirling Albion	5–2	Cowdenbeath	16 October 1948

=== Group 6 ===
Team	Pld	W	D	L	GF	GA	GR	Pts
Alloa Athletic	6	4	0	2	11	9	1.222	8
Queens Park	6	2	3	1	12	8	1.500	7
Kilmarnock	6	2	2	2	14	13	1.077	6
East Stirlingshire	6	1	1	4	5	12	0.417	3

Home team	Score	Away team	Date
East Stirlingshire	2–1	Kilmarnock	11 September 1948
Queens Park	4–1	Alloa Athletic	11 September 1948
Alloa Athletic	1–0	East Stirlingshire	18 September 1948
Kilmarnock	3–3	Queens Park	18 September 1948
Kilmarnock	4–3	Alloa Athletic	25 September 1948
Queens Park	2–0	East Stirlingshire	25 September 1948
Alloa Athletic	1–0	Queens Park	2 October 1948
Kilmarnock	4–1	East Stirlingshire	2 October 1948
East Stirlingshire	1–3	Alloa Athletic	9 October 1948
Queens Park	2–2	Kilmarnock	9 October 1948
Alloa Athletic	2–0	Kilmarnock	16 October 1948
East Stirlingshire	1–1	Queens Park	16 October 1948

=== Group 7 ===
Team	Pld	W	D	L	GF	GA	GR	Pts
Hamilton Academical	6	3	3	0	14	7	2.000	9
St Johnstone	6	2	3	1	11	11	1.000	7
Dundee United	6	2	1	3	14	15	0.933	5
Stenhousemuir	6	1	1	4	9	15	0.600	3

Home team	Score	Away team	Date
St Johnstone	1–1	Dundee United	11 September 1948
Stenhousemuir	1–1	Hamilton Academical	11 September 1948
Dundee United	4–2	Stenhousemuir	18 September 1948
Hamilton Academical	2–2	St Johnstone	18 September 1948
Dundee United	1–2	Hamilton Academical	25 September 1948
St Johnstone	2–1	Stenhousemuir	25 September 1948
Dundee United	4–2	St Johnstone	2 October 1948
Hamilton Academical	3–0	Stenhousemuir	2 October 1948
St Johnstone	0–0	Hamilton Academical	9 October 1948
Stenhousemuir	2–1	Dundee United	9 October 1948
Hamilton Academical	6–3	Dundee United	16 October 1948
Stenhousemuir	3–4	St Johnstone	16 October 1948

=== Group 8 ===
Team	Pld	W	D	L	GF	GA	GR	Pts
Airdrieonians	6	6	0	0	29	7	4.143	12
Ayr United	6	3	1	2	11	15	0.733	7
Arbroath	6	1	2	3	12	14	0.857	4
Dumbarton	6	0	1	5	6	22	0.273	1

Home team	Score	Away team	Date
Airdrieonians	8–1	Dumbarton	11 September 1948
Ayr United	4–2	Arbroath	11 September 1948
Arbroath	2–3	Airdrieonians	18 September 1948
Dumbarton	1–2	Ayr United	18 September 1948
Airdrieonians	6–1	Ayr United	25 September 1948
Arbroath	4–2	Dumbarton	25 September 1948
Arbroath	1–1	Ayr United	2 October 1948
Dumbarton	0–5	Airdrieonians	2 October 1948
Airdrieonians	3–2	Arbroath	9 October 1948
Ayr United	2–1	Dumbarton	9 October 1948
Ayr United	1–4	Airdrieonians	16 October 1948
Dumbarton	1–1	Arbroath	16 October 1948

== Quarter-finals ==
=== Ties ===
Home team	Score	Away team	Date
Dundee	1–1	Alloa Athletic	30 October 1948
Hamilton Academical	1–1	Airdrieonians	30 October 1948
Raith Rovers	5–3	East Fife	30 October 1948
Rangers	1–0	St Mirren	30 October 1948

=== Replays ===
Home team	Score	Away team	Date
Airdrieonians	1–1	Hamilton Academical	3 November 1948
Alloa Athletic	1–3	Dundee	3 November 1948

=== 2nd Replay ===
Home team	Score	Away team	Date
Hamilton Academical	1–0	Airdrieonians	8 November 1948

== Semi-finals ==
Home team	Score	Away team	Date
Raith Rovers	2–0	Hamilton Academical	20 November 1948
Rangers	4–1	Dundee	20 November 1948

== Final ==
12 March 1949

Rangers	2–0	Raith Rovers
Gillick; Paton

Hampden Park, Glasgow
Attendance: 57,450
