= 1953–54 Dumbarton F.C. season =

Dumbarton
1953–1954 season
- Manager: William Irvine
- Stadium: Boghead Park, Dumbarton
- Scottish League B Division: 16th
- Scottish Cup: First Round
- Scottish League Cup: Prelims
- Top goalscorer: League: Jackie Malloch (13); All: Jackie Malloch (14)
Home colours

The 1953–54 season was the 70th Scottish football season in which Dumbarton competed at national level, entering the Scottish Football League, the Scottish Cup and the Scottish League Cup. In addition Dumbarton competed in the Stirlingshire Cup.

== Scottish League ==
After three seasons of mid-table finishes, Dumbarton fell to rock-bottom 16th place, with 22 points, 23 behind champions Motherwell.

In 1949, Division C merged with the Scottish Reserve League to form two regionalised divisions. Only 'first XI's could be promoted from the newly formatted Division C, and this became an almost impossible task as the smaller teams had to face the 'second strings' of Division A. It was however to be Dumbarton's fate that this season saw Brechin City win the North-East section of Division C, and so took Dumbarton's place in Division B. So for the first time since 1906, the club would play league football outside the top two divisions.

5 September 1953 Division B	Dundee United	2–1	Dumbarton	Tannadice Park
	Cruickshanks 42'; McKay 62'		Malloch 80'	Attendance: 8,000; Referee: H Phillips

12 September 1953 Division B	Dumbarton	5–1	Albion Rovers	Boghead Park
	Malloch 33', 70'; Donegan 41'; McCaffrey 55'; McGairy 62'		Docherty 9'	Attendance: 2,000; Referee: D McKerracher

19 September 1953 Division B	Morton	8–0	Dumbarton	Cappielow Park
	Hinshelwood 2'; Gourlay 5', 14'; Hannigan 16', 69', 89'; Linwood 19', 36'			Attendance: 3,000; Referee: D Murphy

26 September 1953 Division B	Dumbarton	4–4	Dunfermline Athletic	Boghead Park
	Malloch 6'; Donegan 18', 32'; McGairy 44'		McSeveney 7'; Henderson 10', 68'; Allan 53'	Attendance: 2,500; Referee: J Smith

3 October 1953 Division B	Queen's Park	6–0	Dumbarton	Hampden Park
	Dalziel 37', 61'; Ward 39', 58', 81', 82'			Attendance: 5,000; Referee: J Mowat

10 October 1953 Division B	Dumbarton	3–1	Ayr United	Boghead Park
	Malloch 11', 86'; Irwin 13'		Fraser, J 56'	Attendance: 4,000; Referee: J Aitken

17 October 1953 Division B	Forfar Athletic	1–2	Dumbarton	Station Park, Forfar
	Elder 13'		McGairy 18'; Malloch 21'	Attendance: 2,000; Referee: G Mitchell

24 October 1953 Division B	Dumbarton	0–0	Alloa Athletic	Boghead Park
				Attendance: 2,500; Referee: D Graham

31 October 1953 Division B	Cowdenbeath	6–1	Dumbarton	Central Park, Cowdenbeath
	Farquhar 15'; Clark 20'; Inglis 39', 41', 53', 72'		Cumming 5'	Attendance: 3,000; Referee: W Bowman

7 November 1953 Division B	Dumbarton	1–4	Motherwell	Boghead Park
	McGairy 79'		Forrest 22', 27', 48'; Redpath 89' (pen.)	Attendance: 5,000; Referee: P Fitzpatrick

14 November 1953 Division B	Dumbarton	2–5	Kilmarnock	Boghead Park
	Shaw 22' (pen.); McGairy 62'		Jack 35', 65'; Harvey 40', 75'; Hood 52' (pen.)	Attendance: 4,000; Referee: H McEwan

21 November 1953 Division B	Arbroath	2–3	Dumbarton	Gayfield Park
	McKenzie 6', 79'		Goldie 16'; Malloch 20', 85'	Attendance: 2,500; Referee: H McClintock

28 November 1953 Division B	Stenhousemuir	6–0	Dumbarton	Ochilview Park
	Allan 10', 28' (pen.); Silcock 20'; Cuthbertson 23', 79'; Henry 50'			Attendance: 1,500; Referee: C Faultless

12 December 1953 Division B	Third Lanark	2–1	Dumbarton	Cathkin Park
	Phillips 29'; Dobbie 67'		Goldie 40'	Attendance: 5,000; Referee: R Yacamini

19 December 1953 Division B	Dumbarton	2–2	Dundee United	Boghead Park
	Swan 48'; Weir 68'		McCann 31'; Quinn 78'	Attendance: 3,000; Referee: F Crossley

26 December 1953 Division B	Albion Rovers	4–1	Dumbarton	Cliftonhill Stadium
	Crawford 47'; Kiernan 50', 89'; Bannon 67'		Hepburn 21'	Attendance: 2,000; Referee: H Gallacher

1 January 1954 Division B	Dumbarton	2–4	Morton	Boghead Park
	Weir 51'; Hepburn 83'		Gibson 20'	Attendance: 4,000; Referee: J Bissett

2 January 1954 Division B	Dunfermline Athletic	6–1	Dumbarton	East End Park
	Henderson 8', 35', 72' (pen.), 80'; Currie 28'; McSeveney 86'		Goldie 48'	Attendance: 4,500; Referee: A McLintock

9 January 1954 Division B	Dumbarton	1–1	Queen's Park	Boghead Park
	Goldie 73'		Ferguson 14'	Attendance: 4,000; Referee: C Faultless

16 January 1954 Division B	Ayr United	6–1	Dumbarton	Somerset Park
				Attendance: 3,500; Referee: J Mowat

23 January 1954 Division B	Dumbarton	0–1	Forfar Athletic	Boghead Park
			Martin 88'	Attendance: 3,000; Referee: W Bowman

6 February 1954 Division B	Alloa Athletic	2–2	Dumbarton	Recreation Park, Alloa
	Wishart 18' (pen.); Davidson 83'		McGairy 8', 75'	Attendance: 3,000

20 February 1954 Division B	Dumbarton	2–2	Cowdenbeath	Boghead Park
	Hepburn 22'; Malloch 59'		Inglis 21'; Murray 79'	Referee: W Brittle

6 March 1954 Division B	Kilmarnock	7–2	Dumbarton	Rugby Park
	Curlett 7', 80'; Jack 11'; Mays 63'; Middlemass 67' (pen.), 68' (pen.); Henaughan 90'		Bell, T 21'; Weir 49'	Attendance: 8,000; Referee: J Mowat

13 March 1954 Division B	Dumbarton	1–0	Arbroath	Boghead Park
	Malloch 14'			Attendance: 2,500; Referee: J Bissett

20 March 1954 Division B	Dumbarton	1–2	Stenhousemuir	Boghead Park
	Bell, T 71'		Anderson 10'; Clifford 57'	Attendance: 2,500; Referee: J Barclay

27 March 1954 Division B	St Johnstone	3–1	Dumbarton	Muirton Park
	Ewen 37' (pen.) 88'; Fraser 75'		Malloch 63'	Attendance: 5,000; Referee: R Davidson

10 April 1954 Division B	Motherwell	6–6	Dumbarton	Fir Park
	Williams 7', 35', 40'; Humphries 22'; McSeveney 27'; Forrest 45'		Donegan 6'; Weir 12', 87'; Gibson 17', 23'; Malloch 70'	Attendance: 4,000; Referee: R Davidson

17 April 1954 Division B	Dumbarton	3–2	St Johnstone	Boghead Park
	Gibson 25' (pen.); Maguire 44' (pen.), 62'		Rodgers 8', 47'	Attendance: 2,150; Referee: F Crossley

28 April 1954 Division B	Dumbarton	3–2	Third Lanark	Boghead Park
	Hepburn 6', 80', 82'		Dick 13', 85'	Attendance: 1,000

== Scottish Cup ==
There was another disappointing first round exit in the Cup with Dumbarton losing to Stirling Albion.

30 January 1954 Round 1	Stirling Albion	2–1	Dumbarton	Annfield Stadium
	Chalmers 2'; Smith 69'		McGairy 51'	Attendance: 6,086; Referee: J Aitken

== Scottish League Cup ==
Another sectional 'bottom' finish (4th of 4) was recorded in the League Cup, with only a single win and a draw from 6 matches.

8 August 1953 Section 8	Forfar Athletic	2–1	Dumbarton	Station Park, Forfar
	Gibson 8'; Martin 23'		Malloch 70'	Attendance: 2,000; Referee: F Crossley

12 August 1953 Section 8	Dumbarton	1–3	Dunfermline Athletic	Boghead Park
	Goldie 30'		O'Brien 27'; Henderson 51', 89'	Attendance: 2,500; Referee: W Brittle

15 August 1953 Section 8	Dumbarton	3–0	Arbroath	Boghead Park
	Donegan 34', 38'; Goldie 57'			Attendance: 4,000; Referee: W Bowman

22 August 1953 Section 8	Dumbarton	0–0	Forfar Athletic	Boghead Park
				Attendance: 3,000; Referee: G Mitchell

26 August 1953 Section 8	Dunfermline Athletic	6–1	Dumbarton	East End Park
	Smith 6'; Currie 22'; Henderson 46'; Mailer 55', 74'; O'Brien 66' (pen.)		Irwin 77' (pen.)	Attendance: 4,000; Referee: H Phiilips

29 August 1953 Section 8	Arbroath	4–0	Dumbarton	Gayfield Park
	Malcolm 30', 57'; McKenzie 44'; McCall 59'			Attendance: 3,430; Referee: J Barclay

== Stirlingshire Cup ==
Dumbarton's disastrous season was completed as their grip on the Stirlingshire Cup was easily released by defeat in the first round to Falkirk.

7 September 1953 First Round	Falkirk	5–0	Dumbarton	Brockville Park
	McCrae 6'; Dunlop 44'; Bell, J (o.g.); Barclay			Referee: P Fitzpatrick

== Dewar Shield ==
The Dewar Shield was a competition played between the previous season's champions of Aberdeenshire, Forfarshire, Perthshire and Stirlingshire. Dumbarton were drawn to meet the Aberdeenshire Cup holders, Buckie Thistle, but no doubt due to travel costs, Dumbarton withdrew.

Semi Final	Buckie Thistle	WO	Dumbarton

== Friendlies ==
Despite being two of the oldest clubs in Scotland, Dumbarton and Stranraer's first XIs met for the first time in two friendly matches.

27 February 1954 Friendly	Dumbarton	2–2	Stranraer	Boghead Park
	Bell, T 45'; McCaffrey 50'		McCutcheon 18', 55'	Referee: J Mitchell

24 April 1954 Friendly	Stranraer	0–3	Dumbarton	Stair Park
			Goal

== Player statistics ==
No.	Pos	Nat	Player	Total		B Division		Scottish Cup		League Cup	
No.	Pos	Nat	Player	Apps	Goals	Apps	Goals	Apps	Goals	Apps	Goals
	GK	(Scotland) SCO	Wallace Murdoch	23	0	17	0	0	0	6	0
	GK	(Scotland) SCO	Walter Scott	14	0	13	0	1	0	0	0
	DF	(Scotland) SCO	Danny Bell	24	0	17	0	1	0	6	0
	DF	(Scotland) SCO	George Ferguson	29	0	26	0	1	0	2	0
	DF	(Scotland) SCO	Jack McNee	17	0	12	0	0	0	5	0
	MF	(Scotland) SCO	John Black	11	0	11	0	0	0	0	0
	MF	(Scotland) SCO	Don Cornock	19	0	18	0	1	0	0	0
	MF	(Scotland) SCO	Andy Crossan	2	0	2	0	0	0	0	0
	MF	(Scotland) SCO	Jim Davie	12	0	11	0	1	0	0	0
	MF	(Scotland) SCO	H Doyle	1	0	1	0	0	0	0	0
	MF	(Scotland) SCO	Tommy Irwin	13	2	8	1	0	0	5	1
	MF	(Scotland) SCO	Don McDonald	2	0	2	0	0	0	0	0
	MF	(Scotland) SCO	J McQueen	1	0	1	0	0	0	0	0
	MF	(Scotland) SCO	Hugh Shaw	31	2	25	2	0	0	6	0
	MF	(Scotland) SCO	Jimmy Stevenson	2	0	2	0	0	0	0	0
	MF	(Scotland) SCO	Jimmy Whyte	21	0	14	0	1	0	6	0
	FW	(Scotland) SCO	Tommy Bell	10	2	5	2	0	0	5	0
	FW	(England) ENG	Ray Brown	7	0	7	0	0	0	0	0
	FW	(Scotland) SCO	Dick Cumming	3	1	3	1	0	0	0	0
	FW	(Scotland) SCO	Tom Donegan	29	6	23	4	0	0	6	2
	FW	(Scotland) SCO	Willie Gibson	8	3	7	3	1	0	0	0
	FW	(Scotland) SCO	Hugh Goldie	23	6	17	4	0	0	6	2
	FW	(Scotland) SCO	Tony Hepburn	21	6	15	6	1	0	5	0
	FW	(Scotland) SCO	Jim Maguire	3	2	3	2	0	0	0	0
	FW	(Scotland) SCO	Jackie Malloch	26	14	23	13	1	0	2	1
	FW	(Scotland) SCO	Tommy Martin	4	0	4	0	0	0	0	0
	FW	(Scotland) SCO	Gerry McCaffrey	16	1	10	1	0	0	6	0
	FW	(Scotland) SCO	Tom McGairy	18	7	16	7	1	0	1	0
	FW	(Scotland) SCO	Jock Weir	17	5	16	5	1	0	0	0

=== Transfers ===
==== Players in ====
Player	From	Date
(Scotland) Hugh Goldie	(Scotland) Albion Rovers	8 Aug 1953
(Scotland) Tom McGairy	(Scotland) Alloa Athletic	5 Sep 1953
(Scotland) Tommy Martin	(Scotland) Dundee	19 Sep 1953
(Scotland) John Black	(Scotland) Morton	3 Oct 1953
(Scotland) Dick Cumming	(Scotland) Motherwell	15 Oct 1953
(Scotland) Don Cornock	(Scotland) Clyde	7 Nov 1953
(Scotland) Ray Brown	(Scotland) Third Lanark	21 Nov 1953
(Scotland) Jock Weir	(Wales) Llanelli	16 Dec 1953
(Scotland) Walter Scott	(Scotland) Hamilton	31 Dec 1953
(Scotland) Jim Davie	(England) Shrewsbury	23 Jan 1954
(Scotland) Willie Gibson	(Scotland) Forfar Ath	6 Feb 1954

==== Players out ====
Player	To	Date
(Scotland) Jimmy Scott	(Scotland) Alloa Ath	29 Aug 1953
(Scotland) Jimmy Frame	(England) Worcester City	12 Sep 1953
(Scotland) Andy Tait	(Scotland) Dundee United	26 Sep 1953
(Scotland) Jim Finnie	(Scotland) Ayr United	26 Sep 1953
(Scotland) Tommy Martin	(Scotland) Forfar Ath	31 Oct 1953

== Reserve team ==
Dumbarton only played one official 'reserve' match in the Second XI Cup, losing in the first round to Third Lanark.
