= 1954–55 Dumbarton F.C. season =

Dumbarton
1954–1955 season
- Manager: Peter McGown
- Stadium: Boghead Park, Dumbarton
- Scottish League C Division (South West): 4th
- Scottish Cup: Third Round
- Scottish Supplementary League Cup: Prelims
- Top goalscorer: League: Hughie Gallacher (27); All: Hughie Gallacher (32)
Home colours

The 1954–55 season was the 71st Scottish football season in which Dumbarton competed at national level, entering the Scottish Football League, the Scottish Cup and the Supplementary League Cup. In addition Dumbarton competed in the Stirlingshire Cup.

== Scottish League Division C (South-West) ==
With club finances re-structured, a new manager (Peter McGown having taken over from Willie Irvine) and a new youthful team in place, the season was approached with some confidence, in the knowledge that only winning the league would guarantee a return to the top 'tiers' of Scottish football.

However, things were not going to be easy, since apart from Stranraer, their league opponents would be the reserve (or 'A') sides of the bigger clubs from the top two divisions - and so it was to prove, for despite challenging strongly throughout the season, and topping the league in early March, in the end only 4th place out of 13 was achieved,

Nevertheless, league re-construction at the end of the season meant that the Divisions C were brought to an end, with Dumbarton, Stranraer, Montrose, East Stirling and Berwick Rangers all joining a revamped 19 team Second Division for season 1955–56.

6 November 1954 Division C (SW)	Dumbarton	3–0	Motherwell 'A'	Boghead Park
	Johnston 18' (pen.); Gallacher, H Heaney			Referee: J Aitken

13 November 1954 Division C (SW)	Airdrie 'A'	3–3	Dumbarton	Broomfield Park
	Neilson; McWilliams 81', 84'		Gallacher, H 14'	Referee: R Rodger

20 November 1954 Division C (SW)	Ayr United 'A'	0–5	Dumbarton	Somerset Park
			Gallacher, H Johnston Heaney; Auld	Referee: J Bonamy

27 November 1954 Division C (SW)	Dumbarton	4–1	Clyde 'A'	Boghead Park
	Gallacher, H 40'; Anderson 46'; Auld 51'; Johnston		McKenna	Attendance: 2,200; Referee: H Baird

4 December 1954 Division C (SW)	St Mirren 'A'	2–2	Dumbarton	Love Street (stadium)
	Hendry 12'; McDonald 33'		Heaney 15'; Gallacher, H 30'	Referee: W Syme

18 December 1954 Division C (SW)	Motherwell 'A'	1–2	Dumbarton	Fir Park
	McSeveney		Gallacher, H 40'	Referee: A Dick

25 December 1954 Division C (SW)	Queen's Park Strollers	4–3	Dumbarton	Hampden Park
	McKinven 15'; Martin 19' (pen.); Callan 38'		Gallacher, H Heaney (o.g.)	Referee: A Crossman

1 January 1955 Division C (SW)	Dumbarton	1–1	Rangers 'A'	Boghead Park
	Gallacher, H		McMillan	Attendance: 3,900

3 January 1955 Division C (SW)	Stranraer	3–3	Dumbarton	Stair Park
	Goal		Heaney; Anderson

8 January 1955 Division C (SW)	Dumbarton	1–3	Stranraer	Boghead Park
	Gallacher, H 7'		Robertson 15'; McIntyre; McCutcheon	Referee: R Baird

29 January 1955 Division C (SW)	Queen of the South 'A'	1–3	Dumbarton	Palmerston Park
	Briscow		Liddell 4', 24', 28'	Referee: D McTaggart

5 February 1955 Division C (SW)	Dumbarton	2–0	Third Lanark 'A'	Boghead Park
	Johnston; Heaney			Referee: H Spence

12 February 1955 Division C (SW)	Dumbarton	2–1	Kilmarnock 'A'	Boghead Park
	McKay 52'; Heaney 54'		Murray 50'	Referee: J Aitken

19 February 1955 Division C (SW)	Dumbarton	2–1	Queen's Park Strollers	Boghead Park
	McKay; Heaney		Church	Attendance: 2,100; Referee: R Baird

5 March 1955 Division C (SW)	Dumbarton	7–1	Airdrie 'A'	Boghead Park
	Gallacher, H 5'; Liddell 7'; Johnston		Price 20'	Referee: R Baird

12 March 1955 Division C (SW)	Dumbarton	1–1	Ayr United 'A'	Boghead Park
	Gallacher, H		Goal

19 March 1955 Division C (SW)	Clyde 'A'	4–1	Dumbarton	Shawfield Stadium
	McHarg 42'; Keogh (pen.); Divers		Gallacher, H 1'	Referee: W Syme

26 March 1955 Division C (SW)	Dumbarton	1–1	St Mirren 'A'	Boghead Park
	Gallacher, H 82'		Cross 50'	Referee: P Rodgers

9 April 1955 Division C (SW)	Partick Thistle 'A'	1–4	Dumbarton	Firhill Stadium
	Goal		Gallacher, H 14', 40', 89'; McDonald 75'	Referee: A Dick

16 April 1955 Division C (SW)	Dumbarton	4–1	Queen of the South 'A'	Boghead Park
	Vine 7'; Gallacher, H 21' (pen.); Auld 26'		Robertson	Referee: C Turnbull

18 April 1955 Division C (SW)	Third Lanark 'A'	1–2	Dumbarton	Cathkin Park
	Mitchell		Gallacher, H 2'

23 April 1955 Division C (SW)	Kilmarnock 'A'	4–0	Dumbarton	Rugby Park
	Newman 23'; Toner 36'

27 April 1955 Division C (SW)	Rangers 'A'	3–0	Dumbarton	Ibrox Park
	Paton; Pryde; Woods

30 April 1955 Division C (SW)	Dumbarton	2–8	Partick Thistle 'A'	Boghead Park
	Kerr 48', 62', 67'; Sharp 54', 57', 75'; Henderson		Gallacher, H 32'; Collins (o.g.)	Referee: A Crossman

=== League table ===
Top Four

P	Team	Pld	W	D	L	GF	GA	GD	Pts
1	Partick Thistle 'A'	24	18	4	2	89	36	53	40
2	Rangers 'A'	24	16	4	4	53	26	27	36
3	St Mirren 'A'	24	14	6	4	57	39	18	34
4	Dumbarton	24	12	6	6	58	46	12	30

== Scottish Cup ==
There was an early exit in the Cup with Dumbarton losing to Montrose in the third round.

9 October 1954 Round 3	Montrose	3–1	Dumbarton	Links Park
	Gallagher 42' (o.g.); Penman 69'; Thomson 73'		Anderson 55'	Attendance: 2,000; Referee: E Youngston

== Scottish Supplementary League Cup ==
No progress was made from the sectional games in the Supplementary League Cup, finishing 5th of 7.

14 August 1954 Section	Third Lanark 'A'	1–0	Dumbarton	Cathkin Park
	Brolls 48'			Referee: J Ferguson

18 August 1954 Section	Dumbarton	2–3	Rangers 'A'	Boghead Park
	Clements; Hepburn		Caldow 18' (pen.); McKenzie, G Paton 87'	Referee: C Turnbull

21 August 1954 Section	St Mirren 'A'	3–0	Dumbarton	Love Street (stadium)
	Cross 65'; Liddell 47'			Referee: W Linton

25 August 1954 Section	Dumbarton	2–1	Queen's Park Strollers	Boghead Park
	Duff		Gray (o.g.)	Referee: H Spence

28 August 1954 Section	Dumbarton	1–0	Third Lanark 'A'	Boghead Park
	Gallacher, H 57'			Referee: T Edwards

1 September 1954 Section	Clyde 'A'	2–2	Dumbarton	Shawfield Stadium
	Newman		McCall; Gallacher, H

8 September 1954 Section	Queen's Park Strollers	0–1	Dumbarton	Hampden Park
			McCall

13 September 1954 Section	Dumbarton	2–4	St Mirren 'A'	Boghead Park
	Gallacher 20'; McCall (pen.)		Robinson 24', 50'; McGill 48'; Liddell	Referee: Mr Bonomay

18 September 1954 Section	Dumbarton	0–2	Clyde 'A'	Boghead Park
			McKenna 20'; Currie 26'	Referee: H Rodger

2 October 1954 Section	Dumbarton	2–0	Partick Thistle 'A'	Boghead Park
	Gallacher, H			Referee: W Syme

25 April 1955 Section	Partick Thistle 'A'	1–1	Dumbarton	Firhill Stadium
	McInnes		Gallacher, H

2 May 1955 Section	Rangers 'A'	2–0	Dumbarton	Ibrox Park
	Carmichael; Simpson, A

=== Section Table ===
P	Team	Pld	W	D	L	GF	GA	GD	Pts
1	Rangers 'A'	12	10	1	1	33	17	15	21
2	St Mirren 'A'	12	6	3	3	30	18	12	15
3	Partick Thistle 'A'	12	7	1	4	32	22	10	15
4	Clyde 'A'	12	4	3	5	23	28	–5	11
5	Dumbarton	12	4	2	6	13	19	–6	10
6	Queens Park Strollers	12	2	2	8	16	28	–12	6
7	Third Lanark 'A'	12	3	0	9	20	35	–15	6

== Stirlingshire Cup ==
There was also a first round defeat in the county cup, to East Stirling.

23 October 1954 First Round	Dumbarton	2–4	East Stirling	Boghead Park
	Gallacher, H Vine		Forsyth,D 26'; Allen 27' (pen.)	Referee: R Morris

== Friendlies ==
5 August 1954 Friendly	Third Lanark 'A'	2–1	Dumbarton	Cathkin Park
	Goal		Goal

11 September 1954 Friendly	Dundee 'A'	0–1	Dumbarton	Dens Park
			Gallacher, H	Attendance: 3,000

25 September 1954 Friendly	Dumbarton	4–2	Kilmarnock 'A'	Boghead Park
	Gallacher, H		Goal

16 October 1954 Friendly	Dumbarton	0–3	Hibernian 'A'	Boghead Park
			Goal

11 December 1954 Friendly	Dumbarton	2–3	Hearts 'A'	Boghead Park
	Gallacher, H 32'; Welsh 90'		Rutherford 70'; Blackwood	Attendance: 2,000; Referee: J Mitchell

26 February 1955J Friendly	Dumbarton	0–8	Motherwell 'A'	Boghead Park
			Reid 5' (pen.); Hunter 82' 86'; Kerr 70'	Referee: J Aitken

== Player statistics ==
No.	Pos	Nat	Player	Total		C Division (SW)		Scottish Cup		Supplementary League Cup	
No.	Pos	Nat	Player	Apps	Goals	Apps	Goals	Apps	Goals	Apps	Goals
	GK	(Scotland) SCO	Lawrence Leslie	1	0	1	0	0	0	0	0
	GK	(Scotland) SCO	Wallace Murdoch	21	0	10	0	1	0	10	0
	GK	(Scotland) SCO	Jimmy Ritchie	15	0	13	0	0	0	2	0
	DF	(Scotland) SCO	Jim Gray	33	0	23	0	0	0	10	0
	DF	(Scotland) SCO	John McKay	37	0	24	0	1	0	12	0
	MF	(Scotland) SCO	Joe Cadden	7	0	0	0	1	0	6	0
	MF	(Scotland) SCO	Don Cornock	30	0	22	0	0	0	8	0
	MF	(Scotland) SCO	Tommy Craig	2	0	0	0	0	0	2	0
	MF	(Scotland) SCO	Jim Davie	5	0	0	0	1	0	4	0
	MF	(Scotland) SCO	Joe Gallacher	25	0	19	0	1	0	5	0
	MF	(Scotland) SCO	Gilhooly	8	0	2	0	0	0	6	0
	MF	(Scotland) SCO	Tommy Irwin	1	0	0	0	1	0	0	0
	MF	(Scotland) SCO	John McCall	32	3	21	0	1	0	10	3
	MF	(Scotland) SCO	Moran	4	0	4	0	0	0	0	0
	FW	(Scotland) SCO	Anderson	17	3	13	2	1	1	3	0
	FW	(Scotland) SCO	Bertie Auld	19	3	16	3	1	0	2	0
	FW	(Scotland) SCO	Les Brown	5	0	4	0	0	0	1	0
	FW	(Scotland) SCO	Clements	1	1	0	0	0	0	1	1
	FW	(Scotland) SCO	Docherty	1	0	1	0	0	0	0	0
	FW	(Scotland) SCO	Duff	2	2	0	0	0	0	2	2
	FW	(Scotland) SCO	Jackie Fearn	1	0	0	0	0	0	1	0
	FW	(Scotland) SCO	Jimmy Finnie	1	0	0	0	0	0	1	0
	FW	(Scotland) SCO	Fraser	1	0	0	0	0	0	1	0
	FW	(Scotland) SCO	Hugh Gallacher	34	32	24	27	1	0	9	5
	FW	(Scotland) SCO	Willie Gibson	1	0	0	0	0	0	1	0
	FW	(Scotland) SCO	John Heaney	26	9	24	9	0	0	2	0
	FW	(Scotland) SCO	Tony Hepburn	2	1	0	0	0	0	2	1
	FW	(Scotland) SCO	Joe Johnston	22	5	21	5	0	0	1	0
	FW	(Scotland) SCO	George Liddell	10	6	9	6	0	0	1	0
	FW	(Scotland) SCO	Jim Maguire	2	0	0	0	0	0	2	0
	FW	(Scotland) SCO	Alex Mayberry	2	0	1	0	0	0	1	0
	FW	(Scotland) SCO	Gerry McCaffrey	2	0	0	0	0	0	2	0
	FW	(Scotland) SCO	McCloy	4	0	0	0	0	0	4	0
	FW	(Scotland) SCO	Jimmy McDonald	2	1	2	1	0	0	0	0
	FW	(Scotland) SCO	Sandford	2	0	0	0	0	0	2	0
	FW	(Scotland) SCO	Jimmy Timmins	1	0	0	0	0	0	1	0
	FW	(Scotland) SCO	Jim Vine	11	1	4	1	0	0	7	0
	FW	(Scotland) SCO	Walsh	15	1	5	0	1	0	9	1

=== Transfers ===
Amongst those players joining and leaving the club were the following:

==== Players in ====
Player	From	Date
(Scotland) Joe Gallacher	(Scotland) Clydebank Juniors	2 May 1954
(Scotland) Les Brown	(Scotland) Kirkintilloch RR	9 Jul 1954
(Scotland) John McKay	(Scotland) Maryhill	12 Jul 1954
(Scotland) Tommy Craig	(Scotland) Kirkintilloch RR	9 Aug 1954
(Scotland) Jim Gray	(Scotland) Yoker Ath	9 Aug 1954
(Scotland) John McCall	(England) Gloucester City	10 Aug 1954
(Scotland) Hugh Gallacher	(Scotland) Arbroath	25 Aug 1954
(Scotland) John Heaney	(England) Bury	11 Nov 1954
(Scotland) George Liddell	(Scotland) St Mirren	22 Jan 1955
(Scotland) Jimmy Ritchie	(Scotland) Hamilton	27 Jan 1955

==== Players out ====
Player	To	Date
(Scotland) Jack Cameron	(England) Hartlepools	22 May 1954
(Scotland) Danny Bell	(Scotland) Dundee United	19 Jun 1954
(Scotland) Willie Gibson	(Scotland) Stenhousemuir	20 Jul 1954
(Scotland) Tom McGairy	(England) Walsall	1 Aug 1954
(Scotland) Walter Scott	(England) Halifax Town	1 Aug 1954
(Scotland) Tom Donegan	(Scotland) Arbroath	14 Aug 1954
(Scotland) Jock Weir	(Northern Ireland) Portadown	20 Nov 1954
(Scotland) Hugh Shaw	(Wales) Rhyl	
(Scotland) Jimmy Whyte	(Scotland) Dunfermline Ath	

== Reserve Team ==
Dumbarton only played one official 'reserve' match in the Second XI Cup, losing in the first round to Clyde, after a replay.
