= 1952–53 Dumbarton F.C. season =

Dumbarton
1952–1953 season
- Manager: William Irvine
- Stadium: Boghead Park, Dumbarton
- Scottish League B Division: 10th
- Scottish Cup: First Round
- Scottish League Cup: Prelims
- Top goalscorer: League: Jackie Malloch (17); All: Jackie Malloch (18)
Home colours

The 1952–53 season was the 69th Scottish football season in which Dumbarton competed at national level, entering the Scottish Football League, the Scottish Cup and the Scottish League Cup. In addition Dumbarton competed in the Stirlingshire Cup.

== Scottish League ==
An uncharacteristic good start to the league campaign saw 5 points taken from the first 3 games, but this form was unable to be maintained and Dumbarton finished in a mid-table 10th place, 16 behind champions Stirling Albion.

6 September 1952 Division B	Dumbarton	1–0	Albion Rovers	Boghead Park
	Irwin 40' (pen.)			Attendance: 3,500; Referee: W Brittle

13 September 1952 Division B	Dunfermline Athletic	2–2	Dumbarton	East End Park
	Muir 53'; McHale 77'		Malloch 22' 77'	Attendance: 4,000; Referee: D Gerrard

20 September 1952 Division B	Dumbarton	2–1	Queen's Park	Boghead Park
	Finnnie 15'; McCaffrey 43'		Black 23'	Attendance: 4,000; Referee: R Davidson

27 September 1952 Division B	Ayr United	5–0	Dumbarton	Somerset Park
	Fraser, J 44'; Beattie 56' 89'; Robertson 65'; Housley 72'			Attendance: 7,000; Referee: J Jackson

4 October 1952 Division B	Dumbarton	2–1	Forfar Athletic	Boghead Park
	Irwin 31', 44'		Brown 57'	Attendance: 2,000; Referee: J Boyd

11 October 1952 Division B	Morton	6–1	Dumbarton	Cappielow Park
	Hannigan 27', 40', 75', 87'; Garth 57'; Linwood 64'		Irwin 5' (pen.)	Attendance: 5,000; Referee: W Bowman

18 October 1952 Division B	Dumbarton	1–3	Dundee United	Boghead Park
	Frame 11'		Quinn 1' 50' 57'	Attendance: 2,500; Referee: R Smith

25 October 1952 Division B	Alloa Athletic	4–1	Dumbarton	Recreation Park, Alloa
	Wilson 15'; Cunningham 41' 54' 56'		Finnie 14'	Attendance: 4,000; Referee: W Crossley

1 November 1952 Division B	Dumbarton	5–5	Arbroath	Boghead Park
	Malloch 12' 30' 78'; Gibbons 74' 82'		Friel 1'; Gallacher 35'; Rennett 44'; McBain 50' 54'	Attendance: 2,000; Referee: J Barclay

8 November 1952 Division B	Kilmarnock	2–1	Dumbarton	Rugby Park
	Murray 8'; Mays 88'		Frame 65'	Attendance: 10,000; Referee: R Yacamini

15 November 1952 Division B	Hamilton	3–1	Dumbarton	Douglas Park
	Rae 9' 59'; Cunning 44'		Tait 61'	Attendance: 5,000; Referee: P Fitzpatrick

22 November 1952 Division B	Dumbarton	4–0	Cowdenbeath	Boghead Park
	Malloch 11'; Shaw 20' (pen.); Donegan 46'; Frame 55'			Attendance: 2,000; Referee: J Barclay

29 November 1952 Division B	St Johnstone	3–2	Dumbarton	Muirton Park
	Andrew 23'; Davies 60'; Bryden 70'		McCaffrey 45'; Tait 68'	Attendance: 3,000; Referee: S Hilton

6 December 1952 Division B	Dumbarton	1–0	Stenhousemuir	Boghead Park
	Irwin 49' (pen.)			Attendance: 2,000; Referee: W Bowman

13 December 1952 Division B	Stirling Albion	2–1	Dumbarton	Annfield Stadium
	Henderson 39'; Smith 60'		Finnie 29'	Attendance: 5,500; Referee: D Graham

20 December 1952 Division B	Albion Rovers	3–1	Dumbarton	Cliftonhill Stadium
	Irwin 12' (o.g.); Orr 61', 74'		Malloch 83'	Attendance: 2,000; Referee: J Mowat

27 December 1952 Division B	Dumbarton	1–1	Dunfermline Athletic	Boghead Park
	McCaffrey 21'		Muir 42'	Attendance: 1,500; Referee: J Boyd

1 January 1953 Division B	Queen's Park	1–0	Dumbarton	Hampden Park
	Ward 63'			Referee: R Davidson

3 January 1953 Division B	Dumbarton	2–2	Ayr United	Boghead Park
	Swan 55'; Shaw 64' (pen.)		Fraser 13'; Beattie 15'	Attendance: 2,500; Referee: J Crossley

10 January 1953 Division B	Forfar Athletic	5–2	Dumbarton	Station Park, Forfar
	Stockdale 12'; McKenzie 28' 58'; Cunningham 48'; Currie 78'		Donegan 10'; Shaw 73' (pen.)	Attendance: 2,000; Referee: W Brittle

17 January 1953 Division B	Dumbarton	4–2	Morton	Boghead Park
	Shaw 24' (pen.); Malloch 60' 80'; Donegan 62'		Gourlay 27'; Quinn 35' (pen.)	Attendance: 4,000; Referee: D McKerchar

31 January 1953 Division B	Dundee United	2–3	Dumbarton	Tannadice Park
	Morrison 25'; Dunsmore 35'		Irwin 66' 73'; Malloch 72'	Attendance: 15,000; Referee: T Barclay

14 February 1953 Division B	Dumbarton	4–2	Alloa Athletic	Boghead Park
	Donegan 24' 70'} Malloch 76'; McCaffrey 82'		Cunningham 11'; Newman 50'	Attendance: 2,000; Referee: T Barclay

21 February 1953 Division B	Arbroath	2–1	Dumbarton	Gayfield Park
	Gallacher 7'; Gray 54' (pen.)		Scott 75'	Attendance: 3,050; Referee: R Yacamini

28 February 1953 Division B	Dumbarton	4–2	Kilmarnock	Boghead Park
	Shaw 6'; Scott 27'} Maxwell 30'; Bell, T 59'		Mays 8'; Harvie 43'	Attendance: 2,000; Referee: W Bowman

7 March 1953 Division B	Dumbarton	1–2	Hamilton	Boghead Park
	McCaffrey 53'		Rae 40'; Cunning 47'	Attendance: 4,000; Referee: D Graham

14 March 1953 Division B	Cowdenbeath	2–2	Dumbarton	Central Park, Cowdenbeath
	Peat 53' 74'		McCaffrey 35', 56'	Attendance: 2,000; Referee: D Gerrard

21 March 1953 Division B	Dumbarton	2–2	St Johnstone	Boghead Park
	Woodcock (o.g.); Malloch		Bryden 42'; Gilroy 47'	Referee: J Jackson

28 March 1953 Division B	Stenhousemuir	1–2	Dumbarton	Ochilview Park
	Silcock 42'		Malloch 63' 65'	Attendance: 1,500; Referee: J Bissett

4 April 1953 Division B	Dumbarton	4–1	Stirling Albion	Boghead Park
	Malloch 3', 50', 60'; Finnie 83'		Chalmers 77'	Attendance: 3,000; Referee: S Hilton

== Scottish Cup ==
In the Scottish Cup, there was a quick exit at the first hurdle with Dumbarton losing to Cowdenbeath.

24 January 1953 Round 1	Dumbarton	1–3	Cowdenbeath	Boghead Park
	Shaw 31' (pen.)		McGeachie 42'; Thomson 64' 87'	Attendance: 6,000; Referee: JA Mowat

== Scottish League Cup ==
Despite an unbeaten home record in the League Cup sectional games, with two wins and a draw - three away defeats, including a 1–11 thrashing by Ayr United (matching Dumbarton's heaviest defeat recorded in the 1925–26 season) ensured that Dumbarton finished 3rd of 4, resulting in no further progress in this competition.

9 August 1952 Section 6	Dumbarton	3–1	Dundee United	Boghead Park
	Finnie 26'; Swan 49' (o.g.); Donegan 82'		McKay 56'	Attendance: 3,000; Referee: J Aitken

13 August 1952 Section 6	Ayr United	11–1	Dumbarton	Somerset Park
	Japp 3', 35', 80'; Fraser 15', 16'; Robertson 46'; McKenna; Hutton (pen.)		Donegan	Referee: R Smith

16 August 1952 Section 6	Stirling Albion	3–0	Dumbarton	Annfield Stadium
	McFarlane 25'; Dick 56' 88'			Attendance: 7,000; Referee: R Yacamini

23 August 1952 Section 6	Dundee United	1–0	Dumbarton	Tannadice Park
	Irvine 1'			Attendance: 7,000; Referee: D McKerchar

27 August 1952 Section 6	Dumbarton	1–1	Ayr United	Boghead Park
	Finnie 57'		Hutton 36'	Attendance: 3,000

30 August 1952 Section 6	Dumbarton	2–1	Stirling Albion	Boghead Park
	Malloch 63'; Irwin 68'		Anderson 23'	Attendance: 2,000; Referee: R Davidson

== Stirlingshire Cup ==
However, silverware was achieved, with a first win in the Stirlingshire Cup, where Dumbarton defeated East Stirling in the final.

25 April 1953 Semi Final	Dumbarton	2–2	Alloa Athletic	Boghead Park
	Scott 30'; Malloch 40'		Goal	Referee: W Brittle

28 April 1953 Semi Final Replay	Alloa Athletic	1–4	Dumbarton	Recreation Park, Alloa
	Lynch (pen.)		Malloch; Scott; Frame

9 May 1953 Final	Dumbarton	3–1	East Stirling	Brockville Park
	Finnie 20', 24'		Hailstones 15'	Attendance: 2,500; Referee: J Boyd

== Friendlies ==
10 September 1952 Friendly	Dumbarton	0–2	Celtic XI	Boghead Park
			Newman; Hepburn	Attendance: 4,000; Referee: W Brittle

2 December 1952 Friendly	Rangers XI	0–1	Dumbarton	Ibrox Park
			Tait 55'	Attendance: 12,000; Referee: R Deas

4 February 1953 Friendly	Dumbarton	2–0	Rangers XI	Boghead Park
	McCaffrey; Irwin

== Player statistics ==
No.	Pos	Nat	Player	Total		B Division		Scottish Cup		League Cup	
No.	Pos	Nat	Player	Apps	Goals	Apps	Goals	Apps	Goals	Apps	Goals
	GK	(Scotland) SCO	Wallace Murdoch	30	0	25	0	1	0	4	0
	GK	(Scotland) SCO	George Paton	7	0	5	0	0	0	2	0
	DF	(Scotland) SCO	Danny Bell	14	0	13	0	1	0	0	0
	DF	(Scotland) SCO	Jack Cameron	3	0	3	0	0	0	0	0
	DF	(Scotland) SCO	George Ferguson	33	0	27	0	1	0	5	0
	DF	(Scotland) SCO	Jack McNee	16	0	11	0	0	0	5	0
	MF	(Scotland) SCO	Tommy Irwin	27	8	23	7	0	0	4	1
	MF	(Scotland) SCO	Don McDonald	18	0	17	0	1	0	0	0
	MF	(Scotland) SCO	Hugh Shaw	37	6	30	5	1	1	6	0
	MF	(Scotland) SCO	Andy Tait	31	2	25	2	1	0	5	0
	MF	(Scotland) SCO	Jimmy Whyte	31	0	25	0	1	0	5	0
	FW	(Scotland) SCO	Tommy Bell	2	1	2	1	0	0	0	0
	FW	(Scotland) SCO	Tom Donegan	24	7	17	5	1	0	6	2
	FW	(Scotland) SCO	Jim Finnie	21	6	15	4	0	0	6	2
	FW	(Scotland) SCO	Jimmy Frame	11	3	10	3	1	0	0	0
	FW	(Scotland) SCO	W Gaston	1	0	1	0	0	0	0	0
	FW	(Scotland) SCO	John Gibbons	4	2	4	2	0	0	0	0
	FW	(Scotland) SCO	John Glover	1	0	1	0	0	0	0	0
	FW	(Scotland) SCO	Jackie Malloch	31	8	24	7	1	0	6	1
	FW	(Scotland) SCO	Jim Maxwell	6	1	2	1	0	0	4	0
	FW	(Scotland) SCO	Gerry McCaffrey	33	7	28	7	1	0	4	0
	FW	(Scotland) SCO	Jimmy Scott	20	1	16	1	0	0	4	0
	FW	(Scotland) SCO	Jackie Swan	10	1	9	1	0	0	1	0
	FW	(Scotland) SCO	Jimmy Wilson	1	0	1	0	0	0	0	0
	FW	(Scotland) SCO	Trialist	1	0	1	0	0	0	0	0

=== Transfers ===
==== Players in ====
Player	From	Date
(Scotland) Jim Maxwell	(Scotland) Albion Rovers	23 May 1952
(Scotland) Jackie Malloch	(Scotland) St Johnstone	4 Jun 1952
(Scotland) Don McDonald	(Scotland) Stirling Albion	11 Sep 1952
(Scotland) John Gibbons	(Scotland) Ayr United	25 Oct 1952
(Scotland) Jackie Swan	(Scotland) Arbroath	11 Dec 1952
(Scotland) Danny Bell	(Scotland) Cambuslang Rangers	17 Dec 1952
(Scotland) Tommy Bell	(Scotland) Duntocher Hibs	9 Mar 1953

==== Players out ====
Player	To	Date
(Scotland) Peter Murphy	(Scotland) Airdrie	16 Jul 1952
(Scotland) Jackie Swan	(Northern Ireland) Ballymena Un	16 Jan 1953
(Scotland) Jim Maxwell	(Scotland) Freed	30 Apr 1953
(Scotland) George Paton	(Scotland) Freed	30 Apr 1953

== Reserve team ==
Dumbarton only played one competitive 'reserve' fixture - in the Second XI Cup - but lost in the first round to St Mirren.
