= 1951–52 Dumbarton F.C. season =

Dumbarton
1951–1952 season
- Manager: William Irvine
- Stadium: Boghead Park, Dumbarton
- Scottish League B Division: 10th
- Scottish Cup: Third Round
- Scottish League Cup: Prelims
- Supplementary Cup: Second Round
- Top goalscorer: League: Jimmy Scott (14); All: Jimmy Scott (20)
Home colours

The 1951–52 season was the 68th Scottish football season in which Dumbarton competed at national level, entering the Scottish Football League, the Scottish Cup, the Scottish League Cup, the Supplementary Cup, and the Festival of Britain Quaich. In addition Dumbarton competed in the Stirlingshire Cup.

== Scottish League ==
Another slow start to the league campaign, with only a single win from 9 attempts, meant that Dumbarton were never seen as challengers for the title but improving performances during the season resulted in a mid-table 10th-place finish with 28 points, 16 behind champions Clyde.

8 September 1951 Division B	Dumbarton	0–1	Falkirk	Boghead Park
			Brown 66'	Attendance: 4,000; Referee: W Brown

15 September 1951 Division B	Kilmarnock	2–1	Dumbarton	Rugby Park
	Russell 21'; Donaldson 51'		Donegan 70'	Attendance: 12,000; Referee: W Brittle

22 September 1951 Division B	Dumbarton	1–2	Alloa Athletic	Boghead Park
	Forbes		Goal	Referee: H Phillips

29 September 1951 Division B	Hamilton	3–2	Dumbarton	Douglas Park
	McSeveney 13'; Todd 17'; Mooney 68'		Scott 47'; Forbes 71'	Attendance: 4,000; Referee: W Davidson

6 October 1951 Division B	Dumbarton	1–0	Queen's Park	Boghead Park
	Smith 29'			Attendance: 5,000; Referee: J Boyd

13 October 1951 Division B	St Johnstone	2–1	Dumbarton	Muirton Park
	Cannon 57'; Buckley 59'		Scott 65'	Attendance: 5,100; Referee: R Main

20 October 1951 Division B	Dumbarton	0–0	Dunfermline Athletic	Boghead Park
				Attendance: 3,000; Referee: W Bowman

27 October 1951 Division B	Albion Rovers	1–1	Dumbarton	Cliftonhill Stadium
	Maxwell 10'		Scott 30'	Attendance: 2,000; Referee: W Livingstone

3 November 1951 Division B	Cowdenbeath	2–2	Dumbarton	Central Park, Cowdenbeath
	McKeown 79'; Scott 86'		Tait 3', 37'	Attendance: 3,000; Referee: J Jackson

10 November 1951 Division B	Dumbarton	3–1	Forfar Athletic	Boghead Park
	Murphy 6', 60'; Frame 48'		McQuade 73'	Attendance: 4,000; Referee: C Faultless

17 November 1951 Division B	Dumbarton	4–2	Ayr United	Boghead Park
	Scott 11', 43', 52'; Frame 80'		Crawford 10'; Stockdale 45'	Attendance: 5,000; Referee: D McKerracher

24 November 1951 Division B	Arbroath	1–2	Dumbarton	Gayfield Park
	Murray 82'		Scott 50', 62'	Attendance: 2,200; Referee: A Gerrard

1 December 1951 Division B	Dumbarton	4–1	Stenhousemuir	Boghead Park
	Murphy 25'; Scott 42'; Frame 48'		McQueen 89'	Referee: S Hilton

8 December 1951 Division B	Dumbarton	2–2	Clyde	Boghead Park
	Frame 58', 70'		Ring 74'; Robertson 89'	Attendance: 7,500; Referee: J Mowat

15 December 1951 Division B	Dundee United	4–1	Dumbarton	Tannadice Park
	McKay 15' 60' 78'; Cruickshanks 38'		Frame 67'	Attendance: 8,000; Referee: J Jackson

22 December 1951 Division B	Falkirk	1–1	Dumbarton	Brockville Park
	Dunlop 14'		Beaton 70'	Attendance: 9,000; Referee: W Brown

29 December 1951 Division B	Dumbarton	4–2	Kilmarnock	Boghead Park
	Frame 23', 52'; Smith 38'; Forbes 62'		Anderson 8'; Harvey 72'	Attendance: 4,000; Referee: H Anderson

1 January 1952 Division B	Alloa Athletic	4–1	Dumbarton	Recreation Park, Alloa
	Lister; Cranston; Newman		Beaton	Referee: R Smith

2 January 1952 Division B	Dumbarton	2–2	Hamilton	Boghead Park
	Scott; Murphy		McMullen; Paterson (pen.)	Referee: W Brittle

5 January 1952 Division B	Queen's Park	0–1	Dumbarton	Hampden Park
			Tait 19'	Attendance: 12,000; Referee: D Gerrard

12 January 1952 Division B	Dumbarton	3–1	St Johnstone	Boghead Park
	Frame 2'; Murphy 17'; McNee 84' (pen.)		Peat 30'	Attendance: 5,000; Referee: J Jackson

19 January 1952 Division B	Dunfermline Athletic	3–2	Dumbarton	East End Park
	Smith 13'; Mays 33'; 85'		Finnie 16', 86'	Attendance: 5,000; Referee: J Boyd

26 January 1952 Division B	Dumbarton	1–5	Cowdenbeath	Boghead Park
	McNee 7' (pen.)		Moran 5'; Young 42'; Picken 50'; Durie 56' (pen.); Thomson 75'	Attendance: 3,000; Referee: C Anderson

16 February 1952 Division B	Forfar Athletic	1–3	Dumbarton	Station Park, Forfar
	Robertson 25'		Scott 29', 80'; McNee 47' (pen.)	Attendance: 2,000; Referee: W Brown

27 February 1952 Division B	Ayr United	4–1	Dumbarton	Somerset Park
	Inglis; Japp; Robertson		Scott	Referee: C Faultless

1 March 1952 Division B	Dumbarton	0–1	Arbroath	Boghead Park
			Murray 44'	Attendance: 2,000; Referee: H Anderson

8 March 1952 Division B	Stenhousemuir	1–1	Dumbarton	Ochilview Park
	Aikman 43'		Finnie 55'	Referee: H Anderson

15 March 1952 Division B	Clyde	3–3	Dumbarton	Shawfield Stadium
	McPhail 8', 11', 84'		Beaton 60'; Donegan 68', 78'	Attendance: 10,000; Referee: D McKerracher

22 March 1952 Division B	Dumbarton	2–1	Dundee United	Boghead Park
	Shaw 31'; Beaton 73'		Downie 88'	Attendance: 2,500; Referee: W Davidson

21 April 1952 Division B	Dumbarton	1–4	Albion Rovers	Boghead Park
	Scott		Orr; Maxwell	Referee: P Fitzpatrick

== Scottish Cup ==
In the Scottish Cup, Dumbarton lost to Falkirk in the third round.

9 February 1952 Round 2	Dumbarton	1–0	Queen's Park	Boghead Park
	Scott 46'			Attendance: 10,000; Referee: W Brown

23 February 1952 Round 3	Dumbarton	1–3	Falkirk	Boghead Park
	Scott 11'		Plumb 43'; Campbell 64'	Attendance: 17,000; Referee: H Phillips

== Scottish League Cup ==
Qualification from the League Cup sectional games was again unfruitful, with Dumbarton finishing 4th and last, recording a win and a draw from their 6 games.

11 August 1951 Section 8	Dumbarton	1–4	Forfar Athletic	Boghead Park
	Frame 17', 57'; Finnie 47' (pen.)		Lawrence 15', 67'; Cunningham 52' (pen.), 88'	Attendance: 5,000; Referee: W Bowman

15 August 1951 Section 8	Ayr United	5–0	Dumbarton	Somerset Park
	Beattie 6'; Telford 37', 39'; Harder 54'; Christie (pen.)			Referee: J Mowat

18 August 1951 Section 8	Dumbarton	1–0	Kilmarnock	Boghead Park
	Beaton 25'			Attendance: 5,000; Referee: C Faultless

25 August 1951 Section 8	Forfar Athletic	1–1	Dumbarton	Station Park, Forfar
	Cuncingham 12'		Scott 50'	Attendance: 2,800; Referee: J Jackson

29 August 1951 Section 8	Dumbarton	1–3	Ayr United	Boghead Park
	Finnie 20' (pen.)		Beattie 15' telford Stockdale	Referee: P Fitzpatrick

1 September 1951 Section 8	Kilmarnock	2–0	Dumbarton	Rugby Park
	Harvey 75'; Mathie 80'			Attendance: 12,000; Referee: M Phillips

== Supplementary Cup ==
After a year's absence, the Supplementary Cup returned for one last season, with Dumbarton reaching the second round before losing out to Alloa Athletic.

29 March 1952 First Round	Dumbarton	1–0	Dundee United	Boghead Park
	Frame 46'			Attendance: 2,000; Referee: W Brittle

12 April 1952 Second Round	Alloa Athletic	4–3	Dumbarton	Recreation Park, alloa
	Taylor 22'; Lister 42'; Jarvie 59', 79'		Scott 18'; Donegan 50', 61' (pen.)	Attendance: 4,000; Referee: W Brown

== Festival of Britain St Mungo Quaich ==
The season started brightly, with Dumbarton winning their first national silverware in 41 years, by triumphing in the St Mungo Quaich - a competition for B Division sides to celebrate the Festival of Britain.

25 July 1951 First Round	Dumbarton	2–1	Kilmarnock	Boghead Park
	Finnie 26', 66'		Harvey 11'	Attendance: 5,000; Referee: W Brittle

28 July 1951 Second Round	St Johnstone	2–5	Dumbarton	Muirton Park
	Buckley; Peat		Beaton; Finnie; Shaw	Referee: H Anderson

1 August 1951 Semi final	Dumbarton	2–1	Airdrie	Boghead Park
	Scott 63', 78'		Shields 49'	Attendance: 8,500; Referee: C Faultless

6 August 1951 Final	Ayr United	1–2 (a.e.t.)	Dumbarton	Firhill Park
	Crawford 53'		Beaton 55'; Finnie 119'	Attendance: 10,000; Referee: J Mowat

== Stirlingshire Cup ==
In the Stirlingshire Cup, Falkirk defeated Dumbarton in the semi-final.

19 September 1951 First Round	Dumbarton	4–3	East Stirling	Boghead Park
	Johnston 10'; Irwin 44'; Smith; Finnie		McKay 30'; Traynor

26 April 1952 Semi-final	Falkirk	3–0	Dumbarton	Brockville Park
	Plumb 10'; Brown 15'; Delaney			Referee: J Mowat

== Player statistics ==
=== Squad ===
No.	Pos	Nat	Player	Total		B Division		Scottish Cup		League Cup		Supplementary Cup		FoB Quaich	
No.	Pos	Nat	Player	Apps	Goals	Apps	Goals	Apps	Goals	Apps	Goals	Apps	Goals	Apps	Goals
	GK	(Scotland) SCO	Wallace Murdoch	1	0	1	0	0	0	0	0	0	0	0	0
	GK	(Scotland) SCO	George Paton	43	0	29	0	2	0	6	0	2	0	4	0
	DF	(Scotland) SCO	Jack Cameron	2	0	1	0	0	0	1	0	0	0	0	0
	DF	(Scotland) SCO	George Ferguson	37	0	25	0	2	0	6	0	2	0	2	0
	DF	(Scotland) SCO	Flaherty	1	0	1	0	0	0	0	0	0	0	0	0
	DF	(Scotland) SCO	Ally Johnstone	4	0	1	0	0	0	1	0	0	0	2	0
	DF	(Scotland) SCO	Jack McNee	43	3	30	3	2	0	5	0	2	0	4	0
	DF	(Scotland) SCO	John Stewart	1	0	1	0	0	0	0	0	0	0	0	0
	MF	(Scotland) SCO	Tommy Irwin	20	0	13	0	0	0	3	0	0	0	4	0
	MF	(Scotland) SCO	Willie McLaren	3	0	0	0	0	0	3	0	0	0	0	0
	MF	(Scotland) SCO	Jim Peden	1	0	0	0	0	0	1	0	0	0	0	0
	MF	(Scotland) SCO	John Sharp	1	0	0	0	0	0	1	0	0	0	0	0
	MF	(Scotland) SCO	Hugh Shaw	41	2	28	1	2	0	5	0	2	0	4	1
	MF	(Scotland) SCO	Andy Tait	32	3	24	3	2	0	4	0	2	0	0	0
	MF	(Scotland) SCO	Jimmy Whyte	37	0	29	0	2	0	0	0	2	0	4	0
	FW	(Scotland) SCO	Eddie Beaton	22	9	11	4	0	0	5	1	2	0	4	4
	FW	(Scotland) SCO	Tom Donegan	16	5	11	3	0	0	3	0	2	2	0	0
	FW	(Scotland) SCO	Jim Finnie	16	9	9	3	0	0	3	2	0	0	4	4
	FW	(Scotland) SCO	Jimmy Forbes	21	3	19	3	2	0	0	0	0	0	0	0
	FW	(Scotland) SCO	Jimmy Frame	38	12	24	9	2	0	6	2	2	1	4	0
	FW	(Scotland) SCO	Willie Johnston	6	0	1	0	0	0	5	0	0	0	0	0
	FW	(Scotland) SCO	Gerry McCaffrey	2	0	2	0	0	0	0	0	0	0	0	0
	FW	(Scotland) SCO	Peter Murphy	19	6	17	6	2	0	0	0	0	0	0	0
	FW	(Scotland) SCO	Jimmy Scott	41	20	27	14	2	2	6	1	2	1	4	2
	FW	(Scotland) SCO	Duncan Smith	36	2	26	2	2	0	2	0	2	0	4	0

=== International ===
Andy Tait and Duncan Smith were selected to play for the Scottish League B XI against the Irish League B side on 15 April 1952 - Smith scored one of the goals in the 6–0 win.

=== Transfers ===
==== Players in ====
Player	From	Date
(Scotland) Ally Johnstone	(Scotland) Clydebank Juniors	16 Jul 1951
(Scotland) Jimmy Scott	(Scotland) Armadale Thistle	16 Jul 1951
(Scotland) Hugh Shaw	(Scotland) Duntocher Hibs	16 Jul 1951
(Scotland) Jimmy Forbes	(Scotland) Rangers (loan)	14 Sep 1951
(Scotland) Eddie Beaton	(Scotland) Aberdeen (loan)	18 Sep 1951
(Scotland) Peter Murphy	(Scotland) Clydebank Juniors	3 Oct 1951
(Scotland) Gerry McCaffrey	(Scotland) Campsie BW	1 Mar 1952

==== Players out ====
Player	To	Date
(Scotland) Willie Johnstone	(Scotland) Freed	30 Apr 1952
(Scotland) Ally Johnstone	(Scotland) Freed	30 Apr 1952
(Scotland) Willie McLaren	(Scotland) Freed	30 Apr 1952
(Scotland) John Sharp	(Scotland) Freed	30 Apr 1952

== Reserve team ==
Dumbarton played a reserve team in Division C (South West) and finished 12th out of 16, recording 11 wins and 4 draws from 30 matches. Note that in addition to the reserve sides of the bigger Division A teams in South and West Scotland, the first teams of East Stirlingshire (relegated from Division B three seasons previously) and Stranraer also competed in this league.

In the Second XI Cup, Dumbarton lost in the second round to Dundee United.

Finally in the Reserve League Cup, Dumbarton could only manage a win and a draw from their 6 sectional matches and failed to progress to the knock-out stages.
