= 1950–51 Dumbarton F.C. season =

Dumbarton
1950–1951 season
- Manager: William Irvine
- Stadium: Boghead Park, Dumbarton
- Scottish League B Division: 9th
- Scottish Cup: First Round
- Scottish League Cup: Prelims
- Top goalscorer: League: Jim Finnie (10); All: Jim Finnie (10)
Home colours

The 1950–51 season was the 67th Scottish football season in which Dumbarton competed at national level, entering the Scottish Football League, the Scottish Cup and the Scottish League Cup. In addition Dumbarton competed in the Stirlingshire Cup and the Stirlingshire Consolation Cup.

== Scottish League ==
The league campaign looked to be following those of recent years, with the first win registered after 8 attempts, however a late burst of 5 wins in the final 6 games saw Dumbarton finish in a creditable 9th place (out of 16) with 29 points, 16 behind champions Queen of the South.

9 September 1950 Division B	Dumbarton	1–1	Dundee United	Boghead Park
	Parlane 30'		McKay 1'	Attendance: 7,000; Referee: W Bowman

23 September 1950 Division B	Dumbarton	0–1	Queen's Park	Boghead Park
			Cunningham 69'	Attendance: 5,000; Referee: J Boyd

30 September 1950 Division B	Cowdenbeath	1–1	Dumbarton	Central Park, Cowdenbeath
	Durie 75' (pen.)		McKay 84'	Attendance: 3,000; Referee: R Smith

7 October 1950 Division B	Dumbarton	0–2	Arbroath	Boghead Park
			Christie 26'; Friel 27'	Attendance: 1,500; Referee: F Scott

14 October 1950 Division B	Ayr United	3–1	Dumbarton	Somerset Park
	Goldie 13', 65'; Crawford 72' (pen.)		Finnie 89'	Attendance: 9,000; Referee: G Milligan

21 October 1950 Division B	Stirling Albion	3–2	Dumbarton	Annfield Stadium
	Anderson, J 13'; Henderson 17', 72'		Parlane 8'; Forsyth 85' (o.g.)	Attendance: 8,000; Referee: W Graham

28 October 1950 Division B	Dumbarton	3–3	Stenhousemuir	Boghead Park
	Parlane 23', 90'; McAra 57'		Thomas 24'; Silcock 45', 65'	Attendance: 4,000; Referee: A Gebbie

4 November 1950 Division B	Queen of the South	1–2	Dumbarton	Palmerston Park
	Brown, J 76'		Parlane 59'; Johnston 72'	Attendance: 7,500; Referee: W Brown

11 November 1950 Division B	Dumbarton	1–5	Albion Rovers	Boghead Park
	Smith 35'		Jack 1', 16'; McNee 12' (o.g.); Maxwell 65', 66'	Attendance: 1,000; Referee: W Livingstone

18 November 1950 Division B	Dumbarton	1–2	Dunfermline Athletic	Boghead Park
	Johnston 79'		Cannon 5'; Miller 70'	Attendance: 4,000; Referee: R Main

25 November 1950 Division B	Kilmarnock	1–3	Dumbarton	Rugby Park
	McGhee 82'		Johnston 14'; Smith 67', 79'	Attendance: 7,000; Referee: H Phillips

2 December 1950 Division B	Hamilton	0–1	Dumbarton	Douglas Park
			Finnie 47'	Attendance: 4,000; Referee: G Milligan

9 December 1950 Division B	Dumbarton	4–1	Forfar Athletic	Boghead Park
	McKay 10', 46'; Finnie 48'; Johnston 69'		Johnstone 50'	Attendance: 4,000; Referee: J Boyd

16 December 1950 Division B	St Johnstone	3–0	Dumbarton	Muirton Park
	Malloch 15'; McNee 29' (o.g.); Brydon 53'			Attendance: 5,000; Referee: H Smith

23 December 1950 Division B	Dundee United	3–2	Dumbarton	Tannadice Park
	Quinn 57' (pen.); Grant 65'; Cruickshank 85'		Finnie 13', 63'	Attendance: 8,500; Referee: J Weir

30 December 1950 Division B	Dumbarton	2–2	Alloa Athletic	Boghead Park
	Johnston 21'; Smith 59'		Moran 49'; Lister 61'	Attendance: 2,000; Referee: J Cox

1 January 1951 Division B	Queen's Park	2–1	Dumbarton	Hampden Park
	Grierson 41'; Dalziel 86'		Donegan 47'	Attendance: 8,000; Referee: G Mitchell

2 January 1951 Division B	Dumbarton	1–0	Cowdenbeath	Boghead Park
	Donegan			Attendance: 4,000; Referee: W Davidson

6 January 1951 Division B	Arbroath	3–2	Dumbarton	Gayfield Park
	McEwan 1'; Binning 71' (pen.); Swan 73'		Frame 21', 83'	Attendance: 3,000; Referee: R Yacamini

13 January 1951 Division B	Dumbarton	2–0	Ayr United	Boghead Park
	Smith 24'; Parlane 79'			Attendance: 5,000; Referee: W Livingstone

20 January 1951 Division B	Dumbarton	4–0	Stirling Albion	Boghead Park
	Frame 11'; Parlane 22'; Finnie 35'			Attendance: 7,000; Referee: W Brown

10 February 1951 Division B	Dumbarton	0–1	Queen of the South	Boghead Park
			Inglis 30'	Attendance: 3,000; Referee: H P Hennderson

17 February 1951 Division B	Albion Rovers	3–1	Dumbarton	Cliftonhill Stadium
	Anderson 60'; Muir 65' (pen.), 77'		Shepherd 36'	Attendance: 2,000; Referee: S Hilton

24 February 1951 Division B	Dunfermline Athletic	2–2	Dumbarton	East End Park
	MacAulay 53'; Mayes 70'		Finnie 39'; Frame 88'	Attendance: 1,500; Referee: H Phillips

3 March 1951 Division B	Dumbarton	2–1	Kilmarnock	Boghead Park
	Tait 25'; McAteer 83'		Jones 18'	Attendance: 3,000; Referee: G Milligan

10 March 1951 Division B	Dumbarton	2–1	Hamilton	Boghead Park
	Tait 36'; Frame 82'		Hunter 74'	Attendance: 3,000; Referee: J McKerracher

17 March 1951 Division B	Forfar Athletic	1–4	Dumbarton	Station Park, Forfar
	Johnstone 85'		Frame 8' 53' 64'; Smith 42'	Attendance: 2,000; Referee: J Jackson

24 March 1951 Division B	Dumbarton	2–1	St Johnstone	Boghead Park
	Tait 61'; Finnie 78'		Bryden 85' (pen.)	Attendance: 3,000; Referee: C Faultless

31 March 1951 Division B	Dumbarton	4–3	Alloa Athletic	Boghead Park
	Tait 24'; Finnie 26'; Parlane 44'; Donegan 77'		Wilson 51'; Lister 72' (pen.); Gillespie 89'	Referee: W Bowman

7 April 1951 Division B	Stenhousemuir	3–1	Dumbarton	Ochilview Park
	Crothers 25', 31'; Kerr 35'		Smith 55'	Attendance: 500; Referee: S Hilton

== Scottish Cup ==
The Scottish Cup saw Dumbarton exit early to St Johnstone in the first round.

27 January 1951 Round 1	Dumbarton	0–2	St Johnstone	Boghead Park
			Bryden 36' (pen.); Buckley	Attendance: 10,000; Referee: H Phillips

== Scottish League Cup ==
In the League Cup, qualification from the sectional games still proved a problem, finishing 4th and last, with a win and two draws being taken from their 6 games.

12 August 1950 Section 5	Dumbarton	1–4	Ayr United	Boghead Park
	Johnston 38'		Crawford 2', 63', 86'; McMenemy 22'	Attendance: 5,000; Referee: W Bowman

16 August 1950 Section 5	Dunfermline Athletic	4–1	Dumbarton	East End Park
	Mayes; Miller 82'; Cannon 70'		Miller 5'	Attendance: 5,000; Referee: C Faultless

19 August 1950 Section 5	Dumbarton	1–0	Kilmarnock	Boghead Park
	McKay 12'			Attendance: 5,000; Referee: F Scott

26 August 1950 Section 5	Ayr United	3–0	Dumbarton	Somerset Park
	Crawford 14', 73'; Henderson 72'			Attendance: 8,000; Referee: R Main

30 August 1950 Section 5	Dumbarton	1–1	Dunfermline Athletic	Boghead Park
	McKay 34'		Parlane	Attendance: 3,000; Referee: W Brown

2 September 1950 Section 5	Kilmarnock	0–0	Dumbarton	Rugby Park
				Attendance: 8,000; Referee: G Mitchell

== Stirlingshire Cup ==
In the Stirlingshire Cup, Stirling Albion overcame Dumbarton in the semi-final after two draws.

18 September 1950 Round 1	Dumbarton	0–0	Stenhousemuir	Boghead Park

18 April 1951 Round 1 Replay	Stenhousemuir	1–3	Dumbarton	Ochilview Park
	Wilson 30'		Finnie 62'; Parlane 63'; Smith 88'	Referee: G Mitchell

28 April 1951 Semi-final	Stirling Albion	0–0	Dumbarton	Annfield Stadium
				Referee: J Boyd

11 May 1951 Semi-final Replay	Dumbarton	1–1 (a.e.t.)	Stirling Albion	Boghead Park
	Tait 15'		Irwin (o.g.)

17 May 1951 Semi-final Replay 2	Dumbarton	0–6	Stirling Albion	Recreation Park, Alloa
			Anderson,J 5' (pen.) (pen.); Bannon 19'; Anderson,A; Silcock	Referee: J Boyd

== Stirlingshire Consolation Cup ==
In a short-lived revival of the Stirlingshire Consolation Cup (a competition for those clubs eliminated early in the previous season's Stirlingshire Cup) Dumbarton finished as runners-up, again to Stirling Albion.

5 May 1951 Semi final	Dumbarton	4–2	East Stirling	Boghead Park
	Finnie 10', 40'		Gardiner; Stobie	Referee: G McDonald

16 May 1951 Final	Stirling Albion	6–1	Dumbarton	Annfield Stadium
	Anderson,J; Henderson; Anderson,A		Tait

== Player statistics ==
No.	Pos	Nat	Player	Total		B Division		Scottish Cup		League Cup	
No.	Pos	Nat	Player	Apps	Goals	Apps	Goals	Apps	Goals	Apps	Goals
	GK	(Scotland) SCO	George Paton	37	0	30	0	1	0	6	0
	DF	(Scotland) SCO	Jack Cameron	1	0	0	0	0	0	1	0
	DF	(Scotland) SCO	George Ferguson	34	0	28	0	0	0	6	0
	DF	(Scotland) SCO	Jack McNee	36	0	30	0	1	0	5	0
	MF	(Scotland) SCO	Tommy Irwin	7	0	5	0	0	0	2	0
	MF	(Scotland) SCO	Don McDonald	23	0	23	0	0	0	0	0
	MF	(Scotland) SCO	Willie McLaren	4	0	3	0	1	0	0	0
	MF	(Scotland) SCO	Jim Peden	9	0	4	0	0	0	5	0
	MF	(Scotland) SCO	John Sharp	25	0	22	0	1	0	2	0
	MF	(Scotland) SCO	Andy Tait	22	4	15	4	1	0	6	0
	MF	(Scotland) SCO	Jimmy Whyte	37	0	30	0	1	0	6	0
	FW	(Scotland) SCO	Alec Braidwood	10	0	6	0	0	0	4	0
	FW	(Scotland) SCO	Tom Donegan	15	3	14	3	0	0	1	0
	FW	(Scotland) SCO	Jim Finnie	27	10	26	10	1	0	0	0
	FW	(Scotland) SCO	Jimmy Frame	13	0	12	0	1	0	0	0
	FW	(Scotland) SCO	Bobby Gibson	1	0	1	0	0	0	0	0
	FW	(Scotland) SCO	Willie Johnston	26	6	21	5	1	0	4	1
	FW	(Scotland) SCO	Bobby McAra	14	1	10	1	0	0	4	0
	FW	(Scotland) SCO	Thomas McAteer	1	1	1	1	0	0	0	0
	FW	(Scotland) SCO	Billy McGuinness	2	0	0	0	0	0	2	0
	FW	(Scotland) SCO	Bobby McKay	13	5	9	3	0	0	4	2
	FW	(Scotland) SCO	Robert Miller	3	0	0	0	1	0	2	0
	FW	(Scotland) SCO	Jimmy Parlane	18	8	14	8	1	0	3	0
	FW	(Scotland) SCO	Thomas Ramsay	3	0	0	0	0	0	3	0
	FW	(Scotland) SCO	George Shepherd	1	1	1	1	0	0	0	0
	FW	(Scotland) SCO	Duncan Smith	23	7	22	7	1	0	0	0
	FW	(Scotland) SCO	Gordon Spiers	3	0	3	0	0	0	0	0

=== Transfers ===
==== Players in ====
Player	From	Date
(Scotland) Robert Miller	(Scotland) Morton	9 Jun 1950
(Scotland) Bobby McAra	(Scotland) Dunipace	27 Jun 1950
(Scotland) Tommy Irwin	(Scotland) Denny Juv	30 Jun 1950
(Scotland) Jimmy Whyte	(Scotland) Dunipace	30 Jun 1950
(Scotland) Billy McGuinness	(Scotland) Dunfermline Ath	1 Aug 1950
(Scotland) George Shepherd	(Scotland) Clyde	1 Aug 1950
(Scotland) Thomas Ramsay	(Scotland) Cowdenbeath	2 Aug 1950
(Scotland) Alec Braidwood	(Scotland) Partick Thistle	7 Aug 1950
(Scotland) Jack Cameron	(Scotland) Dalmuir Rovers	7 Aug 1950
(Scotland) Bob McKay	(Scotland) Port Glasgow	7 Aug 1950
(Scotland) Gordon Spiers	(Scotland) John Browns	10 Aug 1950
(Scotland) Jimmy Parlane	(Scotland) Airdrie	24 Aug 1950
(Scotland) Jim Finnie	(Scotland) Clydebank Juniors	9 Oct 1950
(Scotland) Duncan Smith	(Scotland)	31 Oct 1950
(Scotland) Jimmy Frame	(Scotland) Rangers	7 Dec 1950

==== Players out ====
Player	To	Date
(Scotland) Bobby Donaldson	(Scotland) Cowdenbeath	24 Jun 1950
(Scotland) Jackie Cantwell	(Scotland) Morton	3 Aug 1950
(Scotland) John Turnbull	(Scotland) Stirling Albion	9 Oct 1950
(Scotland) Alec Braidwood	(Scotland) Freed	30 Apr 1951
(Scotland) Bobby McAra	(Scotland) Freed	30 Apr 1951
(Scotland) Billy McGuinness	(Scotland) Freed	30 Apr 1951
(Scotland) Bob McKay	(Scotland) Freed	30 Apr 1951
(Scotland) Robert Miller	(Scotland) Freed	30 Apr 1951
(Scotland) Jimmy Parlane	(Scotland) Freed	30 Apr 1951
(Scotland) Thomas Ramsay	(Scotland) Freed	30 Apr 1951
(Scotland) George Shepherd	(Scotland) Freed	30 Apr 1951
(Scotland) Gordon Spiers	(Scotland) Freed	30 Apr 1951

== Reserve team ==
For the second successive season, Dumbarton played a reserve team in Division C (South West) and finished 15th out of 16, recording 7 wins and 4 draws from 30 matches. Note that in addition to the reserve sides of the bigger Division A teams in South and West Scotland, the first teams of East Stirlingshire (relegated from Division B two seasons previously) and Stranraer also competed in this league.

In the Second XI Cup, Dumbarton lost in the first round to Hamilton.

Finally in the Reserve League Cup, with only a single win from 6 sectional matches, Dumbarton failed to qualify for the knock-out stages.
