= Bobby Collins (footballer) =

Scottish footballer (1931–2024)

- Collins playing for Scotland in 1959

Personal information
- Full name: Robert Young Collins
- Date of birth: 16 February 1931
- Place of birth: Govanhill, Glasgow, Scotland
- Date of death: 13 January 2014 (aged 82)
- Place of death: Leeds, England
- Height: 5 ft 3 in (1.60 m)
- Position: Midfielder

Youth career
- Polmadie Hawthorn Juveniles
- Pollok

Senior career*
| Years | Team | Apps | (Gls) |
| 1949–1958 | Celtic | 220 | (81) |
| 1958–1962 | Everton | 133 | (42) |
| 1960 | → Southern Suburbs (loan) | | |
| 1962–1967 | Leeds United | 149 | (24) |
| 1967–1969 | Bury | 75 | (6) |
| 1969–1971 | Greenock Morton | 55 | (3) |
| 1971 | Ringwood City | 6 | (0) |
| 1972 | Melbourne Hakoah | | |
| 1972 | Ringwood City | | |
| 1972–1973 | Oldham Athletic | 7 | (0) |
| 1973–1974 | Shamrock Rovers | 11 | (1) |
| Total | | 650+ | (157+) |

International career
| 1950–1965 | Scotland | 31 | (10) |
| 1951–1958 | Scottish League XI | 16 | (12) |
| 1958 | SFL trial v SFA | 1 | (0) |
| 1959–1960 | SFA trial v SFL | 2 | (0) |

Managerial career
- 1974-1975: Huddersfield Town
- 1977–1978: Hull City
- 1984–1985: Barnsley
- * Club domestic league appearances and goals

Robert Young Collins (16 February 1931 – 13 January 2014) was a Scotland international football player, best known for his successful spells at Celtic, Everton and Leeds United.

== Playing career ==
=== Celtic ===
Collins was born on 16 February 1931 in Govanhill, Glasgow, Scotland, the eldest of Tom and Bella Collins's six children. He signed a contract with Everton from Pollok at the age of 17, but after a contractual dispute he eventually ended up joining Celtic instead of Everton; he was also working as an apprentice cobbler at the time. He made his debut at outside-right against Old Firm rivals Rangers on 13 August 1949, getting the better of Jock Shaw he helped Celtic to a 3–2 Scottish League Cup victory. Despite being just about 5 ft 3 in (1.60 m) tall, Collins was a strong, hard-working midfield player who was in the Celtic team as a 17-year-old and stayed there for ten years, winning the Scottish Cup in 1951, and the Scottish cup double in 1954. Affectionately known as the Wee Barra by Celtic fans, he was idolised by three generations of supporters. The grandfathers loved his throwback style of keeping the ball close, the dads loved his all-out action style and the kids just wanted to play like him. He was also called up for international duty in 1950, and maintained a frequent presence in the Scotland squad in the later stages of the decade. Collins also represented the Scottish League XI 16 times, scoring 12 goals.

=== Everton ===
In 1958 Collins joined Everton where he played until 1962.

=== Leeds United ===
Collins was an astute addition to the Leeds squad by manager Don Revie in 1962, helping the club avoid relegation. Revie later described Collins as his best-ever signing. Leeds won promotion to the First Division in 1964, and Collins captained the side towards a potential League and FA Cup double a year later; however, Leeds missed out on the League on goal average to Manchester United, and lost the 1965 FA Cup Final to Liverpool. Collins's achievements at Leeds were recognised when he was awarded the Footballer of the Year title in 1965. His sparkling form at Leeds also won him a recall to the Scotland squad after a six-year absence, and he earned three more caps. His international career ended with 31 appearances and ten goals. Collins continued to skipper Leeds until 1966, when he suffered a horrific broken thighbone in a Fairs Cup tie against Torino. He briefly came back from the injury, but age and a struggle to reclaim previous form brought his Leeds career to an end.

=== Later playing career ===
Bury signed Collins and he stayed there for two years.

During a short period back in his native Scotland with Greenock Morton, he doubled up as a scout for Revie, and recommended Joe Jordan. Jordan went on to become a respected and feared striker with Leeds, Manchester United, Milan and Scotland. Collins' last appearance for Morton was in August 1971, in a pre-season friendly against his former club Leeds United.

In 1972 Collins was playing coach of Australian club Ringwood City but left after a disagreement with the club board.

He then had a spell as player-coach with Oldham.

Collins guested for Shamrock Rovers in a friendly with Manchester United at Dalymount Park on 15 October 1973 and signed for The Hoops the following month making his début on the 11th at Glenmalure Park. He played a total of 13 games, 11 in the league scoring once on his second appearance at Finn Harps.

== Managerial career ==
Collins went into management, with spells at Huddersfield Town, Hull City and Barnsley. He also coached within the Leeds youth set-up in the 1970s and then again in the late 1990s.

== Career statistics ==
=== Club ===
Appearances and goals by club, season and competition
| Club | Season | League | | | National cup | | League cup | | Other (Note: Includes other competitive competitions, including the Glasgow Cup, Glasgow Merchants Charity Cup, Inter-Cities Fairs Cup, and Texaco Cup.) | | Total | |
| Club | Season | Division | Apps | Goals | Apps | Goals | Apps | Goals | Apps | Goals | Apps | Goals |
|---|---|---|---|---|---|---|---|---|---|---|---|---|
| Celtic | 1949–50 | Scottish First Division | 26 | 7 | 4 | 0 | 6 | 1 | 2 | 0 | 38 | 8 |
| Celtic | 1950–51 | Scottish First Division | 27 | 15 | 7 | 2 | 8 | 3 | 5 | 0 | 47 | 20 |
| Celtic | 1951–52 | Scottish First Division | 30 | 12 | 2 | 0 | 8 | 1 | 2 | 3 | 42 | 16 |
| Celtic | 1952–53 | Scottish First Division | 14 | 3 | 5 | 0 | 0 | 0 | 2 | 0 | 21 | 3 |
| Celtic | 1953–54 | Scottish First Division | 25 | 10 | 0 | 0 | 4 | 0 | 4 | 0 | 33 | 10 |
| Celtic | 1954–55 | Scottish First Division | 20 | 5 | 7 | 1 | 2 | 1 | 1 | 0 | 30 | 7 |
| Celtic | 1955–56 | Scottish First Division | 26 | 4 | 4 | 4 | 6 | 3 | 4 | 2 | 40 | 13 |
| Celtic | 1956–57 | Scottish First Division | 20 | 5 | 6 | 2 | 11 | 4 | 2 | 0 | 39 | 11 |
| Celtic | 1957–58 | Scottish First Division | 30 | 19 | 3 | 1 | 10 | 7 | 3 | 0 | 46 | 27 |
| Celtic | 1958–59 | Scottish First Division | 2 | 1 | 0 | 0 | 7 | 6 | 1 | 0 | 10 | 7 |
| Celtic | Total | | 220 | 81 | 38 | 10 | 62 | 26 | 26 | 5 | 346 | 122 |
| Everton | 1958–59 | First Division | 32 | 7 | 4 | 3 | — | | 0 | 0 | 36 | 10 |
| Everton | 1959–60 | First Division | 42 | 14 | 1 | 0 | — | | 0 | 0 | 43 | 14 |
| Everton | 1960–61 | First Division | 40 | 16 | 1 | 0 | 5 | 1 | 0 | 0 | 46 | 17 |
| Everton | 1961–62 | First Division | 19 | 5 | 3 | 2 | 0 | 0 | 0 | 0 | 22 | 7 |
| Everton | Total | | 133 | 42 | 9 | 5 | 5 | 1 | 0 | 0 | 147 | 48 |
| Leeds United | 1961–62 | Second Division | 11 | 1 | 0 | 0 | 0 | 0 | 0 | 0 | 11 | 1 |
| Leeds United | 1962–63 | Second Division | 41 | 8 | 3 | 1 | 0 | 0 | 0 | 0 | 44 | 9 |
| Leeds United | 1963–64 | Second Division | 41 | 6 | 2 | 0 | 1 | 0 | 0 | 0 | 44 | 6 |
| Leeds United | 1964–65 | First Division | 39 | 9 | 8 | 0 | 1 | 1 | 0 | 0 | 48 | 10 |
| Leeds United | 1965–66 | First Division | 10 | 0 | 0 | 0 | 0 | 0 | 2 | 0 | 12 | 0 |
| Leeds United | 1966–67 | First Division | 7 | 0 | 0 | 0 | 0 | 0 | 2 | 0 | 9 | 0 |
| Leeds United | Total | | 149 | 24 | 13 | 1 | 2 | 1 | 4 | 0 | 168 | 26 |
| Bury | 1966–67 | Second Division | 10 | 0 | 0 | 0 | 0 | 0 | 0 | 0 | 10 | 0 |
| Bury | 1967–68 | Third Division | 43 | 4 | 3 | 1 | 4 | 0 | 0 | 0 | 50 | 5 |
| Bury | 1968–69 | Second Division | 22 | 2 | 1 | 0 | 1 | 0 | 0 | 0 | 24 | 2 |
| Bury | Total | | 75 | 6 | 3 | 1 | 4 | 0 | 0 | 0 | 84 | 7 |
| Greenock Morton | 1969–70 | Scottish First Division | 28 | 2 | 2 | 0 | 0 | 0 | 0 | 0 | 30 | 2 |
| Greenock Morton | 1970–71 | Scottish First Division | 27 | 1 | 1 | 0 | 0 | 0 | 4 | 0 | 32 | 1 |
| Greenock Morton | Total | | 55 | 3 | 3 | 0 | 0 | 0 | 4 | 0 | 62 | 3 |
| Oldham Athletic | 1972–73 | Third Division | 7 | 0 | 2 | 1 | 0 | 0 | 0 | 0 | 9 | 1 |
| Shamrock Rovers | 1973–74 | League of Ireland | 11 | 1 | 2 | 0 | 0 | 0 | — | | 13 | 1 |
| Career total | | | 650 | 157 | 70 | 18 | 73 | 28 | 34 | 5 | 827 | 208 |

=== International ===
Appearances and goals by national team and year
| National team | Year | Apps | Goals |
|---|---|---|---|
| Scotland | 1950 | 3 | 0 |
| Scotland | 1955 | 5 | 0 |
| Scotland | 1956 | 1 | 0 |
| Scotland | 1957 | 8 | 4 |
| Scotland | 1958 | 7 | 5 |
| Scotland | 1959 | 4 | 1 |
| Scotland | 1965 | 3 | 0 |
| Total | | 30 | 10 |

Scores and results list Scotland's goal tally first, score column indicates score after each Collins goal.

List of international goals scored by Bobby Collins
| No. | Date | Venue | Opponent | Score | Result | Competition |
|---|---|---|---|---|---|---|
| 1 | 19 May 1957 | St. Jakob-Park, Basel, Switzerland | Switzerland | 2–1 | 2–1 | 1958 FIFA World Cup qualification |
| 2 | 22 May 1957 | Neckarstadion, Stuttgart, West Germany | West Germany | 1–0 | 3–1 | Friendly |
| 3 | 22 May 1957 | Neckarstadion, Stuttgart, West Germany | West Germany | 3–0 | 3–1 | Friendly |
| 4 | 13 November 1957 | Hampden Park, Glasgow, Scotland | Wales | 1–0 | 1–1 | 1958 British Home Championship |
| 5 | 1 June 1958 | Dziesieciolecia Stadion, Warsaw, Poland | Poland | 1–0 | 2–1 | Friendly |
| 6 | 1 June 1958 | Dziesieciolecia Stadion, Warsaw, Poland | Poland | 2–1 | 2–1 | Friendly |
| 7 | 11 June 1958 | Idrottsparken, Norrköping, Sweden | Paraguay | 2–3 | 2–3 | 1958 FIFA World Cup |
| 8 | 18 October 1958 | Ninian Park, Cardiff, Wales | Wales | 3–0 | 3–0 | 1959 British Home Championship |
| 9 | 5 November 1958 | Hampden Park, Glasgow, Scotland | Northern Ireland | 2–0 | 2–2 | British Home Championship |
| 10 | 27 May 1959 | Olympisch Stadion, Amsterdam, Netherlands | Netherlands | 1–1 | 2–1 | Friendly |

=== Managerial record ===
Managerial record by team and tenure
| Team | From | To | Record | | | | |
| Team | From | To | P | W | D | L | Win % |
|---|---|---|---|---|---|---|---|
| Huddersfield Town | 3 July 1974 | 23 December 1974 | 23 | 7 | 4 | 12 | 30.4 |
| Hull City | 1 October 1977 | 10 February 1978 | 25 | 6 | 8 | 11 | 24.0 |
| Barnsley | 8 February 1984 | 25 June 1985 | 65 | 24 | 19 | 22 | 36.9 |
| Total | | | 113 | 37 | 31 | 45 | 32.7 |

== Honours ==
Celtic

- Glasgow Cup: 1950, 1956; runner-up 1951, 1952
- Scottish Cup: 1951; runner-up 1955
- Glasgow Merchants Charity Cup: 1953; runner-up 1951, 1954
- Scottish Football League First Division: 1953–54; runner-up 1954–55
- Scottish League Cup: 1957, 1958

Leeds United

- Football League Second Division: 1963–64
- FA Cup runner-up: 1964–65

Bury

- Football League Third Division runner-up: 1967–68

Individual

- FWA Footballer of the Year: 1964–65

== Sources ==
- Doolan, Paul; Goggins, robert (1993). The Hoops. Gill & MacMillan. ISBN 0-7171-2121-6.
- Saffer, David (2004), Bobby Collins: The Wee Barra, Tempus, ISBN 0-7524-3176-5
