= Raymond Brown =

Ray or Raymond Brown may refer to:

== Music ==
- Ray Brown (musician) (1926–2002), American jazz double bassist
- Raymond Harry Brown (born 1946), American jazz trumpeter with Stan Kenton big band
- Ray Brown Jr. (born 1949), American jazz and blues pianist and singer
- Raymond Lee Brown, American trumpeter, Earth, Wind, & Fire
- Ray Brown & the Whispers, 1960s Australian rock band with a singer Ray Brown (1945–1996)
- Raymond Brown, former bassist of American band This Will Destroy You

== Sports ==
=== American football ===
- Ray Brown (American football, born 1936) (1936–2017), American defensive back and quarterback
- Ray Brown (offensive lineman) (born 1962), American football player and coach
- Ray Brown (safety) (1949–2023), American football player

=== Other sports ===
- Ray Brown (National League pitcher) (1889–1955), baseball pitcher for Chicago Cubs in 1909
- Ray Brown (Negro leagues pitcher) (1908–1965), Negro league baseball pitcher
- Ray Brown (cricketer) (born 1950), Australian cricketer
- Ray Brown (footballer) (1928–2005), English footballer
- Ray Brown (rugby league) (born 1957), Australian rugby footballer for Western Suburbs, Manly, New South Wales
- Ray Brown (runner) (born 1961), American middle-distance runner
- Ray Brown (wrestler) (born 1943), Australian Olympic wrestler
- Ray Brown (racing driver) (1923–1989), American stock car and midget car racer
- Raymond Brown (basketball) (born 1965), American basketball player
- Raymond Brown (swimmer) (born 1969), Canadian swimmer

== Others ==
- Raymond A. Brown (1915–2009), American civil rights lawyer
- Raymond E. Brown (1928–1998), American biblical scholar and Roman Catholic priest
- Raymond Frederick Brown (1920–1991), English industrialist, founder of Racal
- Ray Brown (designer) (born 1959), Australian clothing designer
- Raymond Brown, pleaded guilty for criminal conspiracy to commit second degree murder, see 2003 John McDonogh High School shooting

== See also ==
- Raymond Brown Hesselyn (1921–1963), New Zealand fighter in World War II
- Raymond L. Brown (disambiguation)
- Raymond Browne (disambiguation)
