= Husbands (film) =

1970 film by John Cassavetes

- Theatrical release poster
- Directed by: John Cassavetes
- Written by: John Cassavetes
- Produced by: Al Ruban; John Cassavetes (Note: uncredited)
- Starring: Ben Gazzara; Peter Falk; John Cassavetes
- Cinematography: Victor Kemper
- Edited by: Peter Tanner; John Cassavetes (Note: uncredited)
- Music by: Ray Brown
- Color process: Color by Deluxe
- Production company: Faces Distribution
- Distributed by: Columbia Pictures
- Release date: December 8, 1970
- Running time: 142 minutes
- Country: United States
- Language: English
- Budget: $1.7 million

Husbands is a 1970 American comedy-drama film written and directed by John Cassavetes. It stars Ben Gazzara, Peter Falk, and Cassavetes as three middle class men in the throes of a midlife crisis following the death of a close friend.

Distributed by Columbia Pictures, Husbands polarized critics upon release. Jay Cocks of Time described it as Cassavetes's finest work, but other critics, including Vincent Canby, Pauline Kael, and Roger Ebert, lambasted it.

== Plot ==
Gus, Harry, and Archie are three nominally happy husbands with families in suburban New York. All are professional men, driven and successful. The three of them have known each other since their school years. They have grown up together and have now had enough time to discover that their youth is disappearing and that there is nothing they can do to preserve it. They are shaken into confronting this reality when their best friend Stuart dies suddenly and unexpectedly of a heart attack.

After the funeral, they spend two days hanging out, playing basketball, riding the subway, and drinking, including an impromptu singing contest at a bar. Harry goes home, has a vicious argument with his wife, and decides to fly to London. The other two decide to go with him.

They check into an expensive hotel, dress in formal clothing, and meet three young women at a gambling casino. They go back to their rooms with the women. Gus pairs off with Mary, Archie with Julie, a young Asian woman who appears not to speak English, and Harry with Pearl. However, their efforts to hook up with these women are awkward and unsuccessful.

Gus and Archie return to New York, but Harry stays behind. Gus and Archie express concern about Harry and what he will do without them.

== Cast ==
- Ben Gazzara as Harry
- Peter Falk as Archie Black
- John Cassavetes as Gus Demetri
- Jenny Runacre as Mary Tynan
- Jenny Lee Wright as Pearl Billingham
- Noelle Kao as Julie
- John Kullers as Red
- Meta Shaw as Annie
- Leola Harlow as Leola
- Delores Delmar as The Countess
- Eleanor Zee as Mrs. Hines
- Claire Malis as Stuart's Wife

== Production ==
Cassavetes has stated that this was a very personal film for him, having experienced the loss of a loved one after his older brother died at the age of 30.

Cassavetes wrote the dialogue after improvising with Falk and Gazzara, and built the characters around the personalities of the actors.

Falk said that he was asked by Cassavetes to appear in Husbands at a lunch meeting at which Cassavetes agreed to appear with Falk in the 1976 Elaine May film Mikey and Nicky.

Falk said that he and Gazzara contributed to the Husbands script, but that the story, structure and scenes were devised by Cassavetes. Falk suggested the scene at the end of the movie where Archie and Gus arrive home and divide up the gifts. A scene between Archie and Julie was improvised in a hotel room, with Cassavetes at the camera and no other crew present.

Principal photography lasted from January 20, 1969 through mid-July 1969.

== Release ==
=== Promotion ===
On September 18, 1970, Cassavetes, Falk, and Gazzara appeared on The Dick Cavett Show, ostensibly to promote the release of Husbands. However, they actively avoided almost every question Cavett asked about the film, and later admitted to drinking alcohol before the show.

=== Running time edits ===
Cassavetes cut around 85 minutes of footage from the film in order to shorten it to its contractual requirement of 140 minutes. After the film was released, distributor Columbia Pictures cut an additional 11 minutes from the film in response to negative reviews and audience walkouts.

== Critical reception ==
Upon release, Husbands received disparate reviews from critics. Jay Cocks of Time wrote that "Husbands may be one of the best movies anyone will ever see. It is certainly the best movie anyone will ever live through." He described it as an important and great film, and as Cassavetes' finest work. In response, Roger Ebert of the Chicago Sun-Times wrote that "seldom has Time given a better review to a worse movie." Ebert gave the film two out of four stars, and wrote that it "shows an important director not merely failing, but not even understanding why." He also criticized the improvisations, writing: "There are long passages of dialogue in which the actors seem to be trying to think of something to say."

Pauline Kael, in her "vituperative" New Yorker review, described Husbands as "just infantile and offensive." Writing for The New York Times, critic Vincent Canby called the film "unbearably long", and concluded of the three characters that "when it's all over, they are tired, but not much wiser—which is pretty much the sum and substance of Husbands." Tony Mastroianni of the Cleveland Press wrote that the "[film's] dialog consists of fragments, of exclamations, of three actors trying to upstage each other. What has been done is undisciplined and what has been given us is unselective. The camera runs and simply photographs everything that passes before it. The microphone listens. It is like a big budget home movie."

Stanley Kauffmann of The New Republic described Husbands as "trash with clothes on".

In a retrospective assessment of the film, Philip French of The Observer called it "highly uneven, painfully drawn-out, deeply sincere, wildly misogynistic and at times agonisingly tedious. It is also intermittently brilliant, with moments of piercing honesty. There is, however, not a single memorable line of dialogue or anything that might pass for wit. On the other hand, Cassavetes's gifts as a director of actors are evident." Conversely, Richard Brody of The New Yorker called the film a "formally radical, deeply personal work" that "still packs plenty of surprises."

Gene Siskel of the Chicago Tribune included the film on his list of top 10 films of the year. Dave Calhoun of Time Out also gave the film a positive review, awarding it four out of five stars.

On the review aggregator website Rotten Tomatoes, Husbands holds an approval rating of 66% based on 35 reviews, with an average score of 6.3/10. Metacritic, which uses a weighted average, assigned the film a score of 66 out of 100, based on 16 critics, indicating "generally favorable" reviews.

== Home media ==
In August 2009, Husbands was released on DVD, with the 11 minutes that had been cut by Columbia Pictures restored. The film was released on DVD and Blu-ray by the Criterion Collection on May 26, 2020.

== See also ==
- List of American films of 1970
- New Hollywood
