= Raymond L. Brown =

Raymond L. Brown may refer to:

- Ray Brown (American football, born 1936) (1936–2017), former professional American football defensive back and quarterback
- Raymond Lee Brown, American trumpeter and former section leader of the Earth, Wind, & Fire horns
