= Raymond Browne (disambiguation) =

Raymond Browne (born 1957) is an Irish bishop.

Raymond Browne or Ray Browne may also refer to:

- Ray Browne (politician) (1939–2010), American politician and businessman
- Ray B. Browne (1922–2009), American educator

== See also ==
- Raymond Brown (disambiguation)
