= John Black (footballer, born 1914) =

Scottish footballer

Personal information
- Full name: John Anderson Spence Black
- Date of birth: 17 June 1914
- Date of death: 1992 (aged 78)
- Place of death: Glasgow, Scotland
- Position: Centre half

Youth career
- Glasgow Perthshire

Senior career*
Years	Team	Apps	(Gls)
1946–1947	Third Lanark	5	(0)
1947–1948	Alloa Athletic	9	(0)
1947–1949	Airdrie	14	(0)
1951–1953	Morton		
1953–1954	Dumbarton	11	(0)
1956–1957	Chelmsford City		
- * Club domestic league appearances and goals

John Anderson Spence Black (17 June 1914 – 1992) was a Scottish footballer who played for Third Lanark, Alloa Athletic, Airdrie, Morton, Dumbarton and Chelmsford City. Black died in Glasgow, Scotland in 1992 at the age of 78.
