= Ray Brown (cricketer) =

Australian cricketer (born 1950)

Personal information
- Born: 3 November 1950 (age 76); New Norfolk, Tasmania, Australia

Domestic team information
- Years: Team
- 1976-1977: Tasmania
- Source: Cricinfo, 14 March 2016

Ray Brown (born 3 November 1950) is an Australian former cricketer. He played one first-class match for Tasmania in 1976/77.

== See also ==
- List of Tasmanian representative cricketers
