= Jim Stevenson (footballer, born 1935) =

Scottish footballer

Personal information
- Date of birth: 1935
- Place of birth: Falkirk, Scotland
- Date of death: 2 March 2009 (aged 73–74)
- Place of death: Mitcheldean, England
- Positions: Wing half; centre half

Senior career*
Years	Team	Apps	(Gls)
1953–1954	Dumbarton	2	(0)
1954–1955	Camelon Juniors		
1955–1959	Dundee	10	(0)
1956–1958	→ RAF Kirkham (loan)		
1959–1963	Dunfermline Athletic	30	(0)
–	Cheltenham Town		
- * Club domestic league appearances and goals

Jim Stevenson (1935 – 2 March 2009) was a Scottish footballer who played for Dundee, Dunfermline Athletic and Cheltenham Town.

He started his playing career as a wing half, featuring briefly for Dumbarton then played for junior side Camelon Juniors before being signed by Dundee, making 10 appearances in 1955–56 before he was required to undertake two years of national service in the Royal Air Force where he played for RAF Kirkham.

Eventually released by Dundee, he joined Dunfermline Athletic in October 1959, becoming the club's first choice centre half. 3 December 1960 saw Stevenson break his leg, an injury which caused him to miss Dunfermline winning the Scottish Cup.

His return to the team came almost a year after the injury on 2 September 1961 in a reserve game against Motherwell and he was eventually recalled to the first team in a 9–0 cup win over Wigtown & Bladnoch on 27 January 1962. However, manager Jock Stein brought in Jim McLean who successfully filled the defensive role along with George Miller, and Stevenson was eventually released at the end of 1962–63.

After leaving Dunfermline Athletic he and his wife Joyce moved to England, settling in Cheltenham; he played for non-league Cheltenham Town and started working as an Electronics Engineer with Smith Industries Aviation. After retiring from football he refused to go into coaching and eventually retired from his job at Smith's.

Stevenson had for a number of years suffered from Alzheimer's Disease and had spent the last three years of his life in a Gloucestershire nursing home. He died on 2 March 2009 at the nursing home in Mitcheldean.
