= Jimmy Ritchie =

Scottish footballer (1925–2003)

Personal information
- Full name: James Ritchie
- Date of birth: 25 December 1925
- Place of birth: Glasgow, Scotland
- Date of death: 2003 (aged 77–78)
- Position: Goalkeeper

Youth career
- Giffnock North

Senior career*
Years	Team	Apps	(Gls)
1951–1952	Alloa Athletic	26	(0)
1952–1954	Hamilton	32	(0)
1954–1956	Dumbarton	22	(0)
- * Club domestic league appearances and goals

James Ritchie (25 December 1925 – 2003) was a Scottish footballer who played for Alloa Athletic, Hamilton and Dumbarton.
