= John McKay (1950s footballer) =

Scottish footballer

Personal information
- Position: Right back

Youth career
- Maryhill

Senior career*
Years	Team	Apps	(Gls)
1954–1958	Dumbarton	96	(1)
- * Club domestic league appearances and goals

John McKay was a Scottish football player during the mid-1950s. He originally played 'junior' football with Maryhill before signing up with Dumbarton in the summer of 1954. Here he played with distinction, being a constant in the Dumbarton defence for four seasons.
