= 1954–55 Scottish Football League =

Scottish football season

Statistics of the Scottish Football League in season 1954–55.

== Scottish League Division A ==
Pos	Team	Pld	W	D	L	GF	GA	GD	Pts	Qualification
1	Aberdeen (C)	30	24	1	5	73	26	+47	49	
2	Celtic	30	19	8	3	76	37	+39	46	
3	Rangers	30	19	3	8	67	33	+34	41	
4	Hearts	30	16	7	7	74	45	+29	39	
5	Hibernian	30	15	4	11	64	54	+10	34	Invitation for the European Cup first round
6	St Mirren	30	12	8	10	55	54	+1	32	
7	Clyde	30	11	9	10	59	50	+9	31	
8	Dundee	30	13	4	13	48	48	0	30	
9	Partick Thistle	30	11	7	12	49	61	−12	29	
10	Kilmarnock	30	10	6	14	46	58	−12	26	
11	East Fife	30	9	6	15	51	62	−11	24	
12	Falkirk	30	8	8	14	42	54	−12	24	
13	Queen of the South	30	9	6	15	38	56	−18	24	
14	Raith Rovers	30	10	3	17	49	57	−8	23	
15	Motherwell	30	9	4	17	42	62	−20	22	
16	Stirling Albion	30	2	2	26	29	105	−76	6	

Source: RSSSF
(C) Champions

== Scottish League Division B ==
Pos	Team	Pld	W	D	L	GF	GA	GD	Pts	Promotion or relegation
1	Airdrieonians	30	18	10	2	103	61	+42	46	Promotion to the 1955–56 Division One
2	Dunfermline Athletic	30	19	4	7	72	40	+32	42	Promotion to the 1955–56 Division One
3	Hamilton Academical	30	17	5	8	74	51	+23	39	
4	Queen's Park	30	15	5	10	65	36	+29	35	
5	Third Lanark	30	13	7	10	63	49	+14	33	
6	Stenhousemuir	30	12	8	10	70	51	+19	32	
7	St Johnstone	30	15	2	13	60	51	+9	32	
8	Ayr United	30	14	4	12	61	73	−12	32	
9	Morton	30	12	5	13	58	69	−11	29	
10	Forfar Athletic	30	11	6	13	63	80	−17	28	
11	Albion Rovers	30	8	10	12	50	69	−19	26	
12	Arbroath	30	8	8	14	55	72	−17	24	
13	Dundee United	30	8	6	16	55	70	−15	22	
14	Cowdenbeath	30	8	5	17	55	72	−17	21	
15	Alloa Athletic	30	7	6	17	51	75	−24	20	
16	Brechin City	30	8	3	19	53	89	−36	19	

Source: "1954-1955 Division B - SPFL Archive". SPFL.

== Scottish League Division C North East ==
Pos	Team	Pld	W	D	L	GF	GA	GR	Pts	Promotion or relegation
1	Aberdeen II	24	20	0	4	97	22	4.409	40	Left the League
2	Hibernian II	24	14	4	6	45	33	1.364	32	Left the League
3	Dundee II	24	11	5	8	59	55	1.073	27	Left the League
4	Heart of Midlothian II	24	11	4	9	50	42	1.190	26	Left the League
5	Stirling Albion II	24	11	4	9	48	47	1.021	26	Left the League
6	Raith Rovers II	24	10	5	9	50	47	1.064	25	Left the League
7	Celtic II	24	9	6	9	36	44	0.818	24	Left the League
8	Montrose	24	10	2	12	53	60	0.883	22	Promotion to the 1955–56 Division Two
9	Falkirk II	24	9	3	12	43	52	0.827	21	Left the League
10	East Stirlingshire	24	8	4	12	58	75	0.773	20	Promotion to the 1955–56 Division Two
11	Dunfermline Athletic II	24	8	2	14	43	61	0.705	18	Left the League
12	East Fife II	24	6	6	12	32	50	0.640	18	Left the League
13	Berwick Rangers	24	6	1	17	35	61	0.574	13	Promotion to the 1955–56 Division Two

Source: rsssf

== Scottish League Division C South West ==
Pos	Team	Pld	W	D	L	GF	GA	GR	Pts	Promotion or relegation
1	Partick Thistle II	24	18	2	4	89	36	2.472	38	Left the League
2	Rangers II	24	16	4	4	53	26	2.038	36	Left the League
3	St Mirren II	24	14	4	6	57	39	1.462	32	Left the League
4	Dumbarton	24	12	6	6	58	46	1.261	30	Promotion to the 1955–56 Division Two
5	Clyde II	24	12	3	9	53	39	1.359	27	Left the League
6	Motherwell II	24	10	4	10	56	45	1.244	24	Left the League
7	Kilmarnock II	24	9	4	11	53	49	1.082	22	Left the League
8	Stranraer	24	8	4	12	54	59	0.915	20	Promotion to the 1955–56 Division Two
9	Queen of the South II	24	7	4	13	49	71	0.690	18	Left the League
10	Ayr United II	24	7	4	13	37	58	0.638	18	Left the League
11	Queen's Park II	24	6	4	14	36	57	0.632	16	Left the League
12	Third Lanark II	24	7	2	15	43	70	0.614	16	Left the League
13	Airdrieonians II	24	5	5	14	58	101	0.574	15	Left the League

Source: rsssf

== See also ==
- 1954–55 in Scottish football
