= 1951–52 Scottish Football League =

Scottish football season

Statistics of the Scottish Football League in season 1951–52.

== Scottish League Division A ==
Pos	Team	Pld	W	D	L	GF	GA	GD	Pts
1	Hibernian	30	20	5	5	92	36	+56	45
2	Rangers	30	16	9	5	61	31	+30	41
3	East Fife	30	17	3	10	71	49	+22	37
4	Heart of Midlothian	30	14	7	9	69	53	+16	35
5	Raith Rovers	30	14	5	11	43	42	+1	33
6	Partick Thistle	30	12	7	11	48	51	−3	31
7	Motherwell	30	12	7	11	51	57	−6	31
8	Dundee	30	11	6	13	53	52	+1	28
9	Celtic	30	10	8	12	52	55	−3	28
10	Queen of the South	30	10	8	12	50	60	−10	28
11	Aberdeen	30	10	7	13	65	58	+7	27
12	Third Lanark	30	9	8	13	51	62	−11	26
13	Airdrieonians	30	11	4	15	54	69	−15	26
14	St Mirren	30	10	5	15	43	58	−15	25
15	Morton	30	9	6	15	49	56	−7	24
16	Stirling Albion	30	5	5	20	36	99	−63	15

Source: RSSSF

== Scottish League Division B ==
Pos	Team	Pld	W	D	L	GF	GA	GD	Pts	Promotion or relegation
1	Clyde	30	19	6	5	100	45	+55	44	Promotion to the 1952–53 Division A
2	Falkirk	30	18	7	5	80	34	+46	43	Promotion to the 1952–53 Division A
3	Ayr United	30	17	5	8	55	45	+10	39	
4	Dundee United	30	16	5	9	75	60	+15	37	
5	Kilmarnock	30	16	2	12	62	48	+14	34	
6	Dunfermline Athletic	30	15	2	13	74	65	+9	32	
7	Alloa Athletic	30	13	6	11	55	49	+6	32	
8	Cowdenbeath	30	12	8	10	66	67	−1	32	
9	Hamilton Academical	30	12	6	12	47	51	−4	30	
10	Dumbarton	30	10	8	12	51	57	−6	28	
11	St Johnstone	30	9	7	14	62	68	−6	25	
12	Forfar Athletic	30	10	4	16	59	97	−38	24	
13	Stenhousemuir	30	8	6	16	57	74	−17	22	
14	Albion Rovers	30	6	10	14	39	57	−18	22	
15	Queen's Park	30	8	4	18	40	62	−22	20	
16	Arbroath	30	6	4	20	40	83	−43	16	

Source: "1951-1952 Division B - SPFL Archive". SPFL.

== Scottish League Division C North East ==
Pos	Team	Pld	W	D	L	GF	GA	GR	Pts	Promotion or relegation
1	Dundee II	30	20	4	6	94	46	2.043	44	
2	Heart of Midlothian II	30	19	4	7	73	36	2.028	42	
3	Hibernian II	30	19	4	7	88	44	2.000	42	
4	Celtic II	30	19	3	8	68	49	1.388	41	
5	Aberdeen II	30	17	4	9	82	47	1.745	38	
6	East Fife II	30	15	5	10	66	57	1.158	35	
7	St. Johnstone II	30	14	5	11	66	71	0.930	33	
8	Berwick Rangers	30	12	7	11	66	68	0.971	31	
9	Stirling Albion II	30	13	2	15	51	65	0.785	28	
10	Raith Rovers II	30	10	6	14	51	56	0.911	26	
11	Brechin City	30	9	7	14	57	65	0.877	25	
12	Dunfermline Athletic II	30	10	5	15	57	72	0.792	25	
13	Montrose	30	10	5	15	47	69	0.681	25	
14	Falkirk II	30	8	2	20	65	85	0.765	18	
15	Leith Athletic	30	5	7	18	46	88	0.523	17	
16	Dundee United II	30	3	4	23	35	94	0.372	10	Left the League

Source: rsssf

== Scottish League Division C South West ==
Pos	Team	Pld	W	D	L	GF	GA	GR	Pts	Promotion or relegation
1	Rangers II	30	22	7	1	106	31	3.419	51	
2	Greenock Morton II	30	16	7	7	75	48	1.563	39	
3	Partick Thistle II	30	15	7	8	72	50	1.440	37	
4	Stranraer	30	15	6	9	69	52	1.327	36	
5	St Mirren II	30	15	4	11	63	49	1.286	34	
6	Third Lanark II	30	13	6	11	57	46	1.239	32	
7	Ayr United II	30	12	8	10	53	74	0.716	32	
8	Queen of the South II	30	14	3	13	54	63	0.857	31	
9	Clyde II	30	12	5	13	57	58	0.983	29	
10	Motherwell II	30	12	3	15	57	62	0.919	27	
11	East Stirlingshire	30	10	7	13	53	72	0.736	27	
12	Dumbarton II	30	11	4	15	51	62	0.823	26	Left the League
13	Queen's Park II	30	7	9	14	45	63	0.714	23	
14	Kilmarnock II	30	8	7	15	51	67	0.761	23	
15	Airdrieonians II	30	7	4	19	49	78	0.628	18	
16	Hamilton Academical II	30	5	5	20	34	71	0.479	15	Left the League

Source: rsssf

== See also ==
- 1951–52 in Scottish football
