= 1953–54 Scottish Football League =

Scottish football season

Statistics of the Scottish Football League in season 1953–54.

== Scottish League Division A ==
Pos	Team	Pld	W	D	L	GF	GA	GD	Pts
1	Celtic	30	20	3	7	72	29	+43	43
2	Heart of Midlothian	30	16	6	8	70	45	+25	38
3	Partick Thistle	30	17	1	12	76	54	+22	35
4	Rangers	30	13	8	9	56	35	+21	34
5	Hibernian	30	15	4	11	72	51	+21	34
6	East Fife	30	13	8	9	55	45	+10	34
7	Dundee	30	14	6	10	46	47	−1	34
8	Clyde	30	15	4	11	64	67	−3	34
9	Aberdeen	30	15	3	12	66	51	+15	33
10	Queen of the South	30	14	4	12	72	58	+14	32
11	St Mirren	30	12	4	14	44	54	−10	28
12	Raith Rovers	30	10	6	14	56	60	−4	26
13	Falkirk	30	9	7	14	47	61	−14	25
14	Stirling Albion	30	10	4	16	39	62	−23	24
15	Airdrieonians	30	5	5	20	41	92	−51	15
16	Hamilton Academical	30	4	3	23	29	94	−65	11

Source: RSSSF

== Scottish League Division B ==
Pos	Team	Pld	W	D	L	GF	GA	GD	Pts	Promotion or relegation
1	Motherwell	30	21	3	6	109	43	+66	45	Promotion to the 1954–55 Division A
2	Kilmarnock	30	19	4	7	71	39	+32	42	Promotion to the 1954–55 Division A
3	Third Lanark	30	13	10	7	78	48	+30	36	
4	Stenhousemuir	30	14	8	8	66	58	+8	36	
5	Morton	30	15	3	12	85	65	+20	33	
6	St Johnstone	30	14	3	13	80	71	+9	31	
7	Albion Rovers	30	12	7	11	55	63	−8	31	
8	Dunfermline Athletic	30	11	9	10	48	57	−9	31	
9	Ayr United	30	11	8	11	50	56	−6	30	
10	Queen's Park	30	9	9	12	56	51	+5	27	
11	Alloa Athletic	30	7	10	13	50	72	−22	24	
12	Forfar Athletic	30	10	4	16	38	69	−31	24	
13	Cowdenbeath	30	9	5	16	67	81	−14	23	
14	Arbroath	30	8	7	15	53	67	−14	23	
15	Dundee United	30	8	6	16	54	79	−25	22	
16	Dumbarton	30	7	8	15	51	92	−41	22	Relegated to the 1954–55 Division C

Source: "1953-1954 Division B - SPFL Archive". SPFL.

== Scottish League Division C North East ==
Pos	Team	Pld	W	D	L	GF	GA	GR	Pts	Promotion or relegation
1	Brechin City	24	13	8	3	49	24	2.042	34	Promotion to the 1954–55 Division B
2	Aberdeen II	24	16	1	7	66	35	1.886	33	
3	Dundee II	24	15	3	6	58	36	1.611	33	
4	Celtic II	24	13	4	7	56	38	1.474	30	
5	Berwick Rangers	24	9	8	7	53	46	1.152	26	
6	Hibernian II	24	11	3	10	44	45	0.978	25	
7	Raith Rovers II	24	9	7	8	44	49	0.898	25	
8	Heart of Midlothian II	24	9	6	9	48	50	0.960	24	
9	Falkirk II	24	10	3	11	58	56	1.036	23	
10	Stirling Albion II	24	6	6	12	34	51	0.667	18	
11	East Fife II	24	6	4	14	42	55	0.764	16	
12	Dunfermline Athletic II	24	6	3	15	56	77	0.727	15	
13	Montrose	24	4	2	18	49	95	0.516	10	

Source: rsssf

== Scottish League Division C South West ==
Pos	Team	Pld	W	D	L	GF	GA	GR	Pts	Promotion or relegation
1	Rangers II	26	17	3	6	60	33	1.818	37	
2	Partick Thistle II	26	16	4	6	63	24	2.625	36	
3	Stranraer	26	15	5	6	73	43	1.698	35	
4	Clyde II	26	16	2	8	82	51	1.608	34	
5	St Mirren II	26	15	3	8	77	51	1.510	33	
6	Airdrieonians II	26	13	3	10	71	56	1.268	29	
7	Motherwell II	26	10	6	10	55	51	1.078	26	
8	Hamilton Academical II	26	10	4	12	43	48	0.896	24	Left the League
9	Ayr United II	26	8	5	13	55	77	0.714	21	
10	East Stirlingshire	26	9	2	15	46	82	0.561	20	Transferred to North East
11	Third Lanark II	26	7	5	14	47	58	0.810	19	
12	Queen of the South II	26	7	5	14	48	74	0.649	19	
13	Kilmarnock II	26	7	4	15	46	74	0.622	18	
14	Queen's Park II	26	4	5	17	34	79	0.430	13	

Source: rsssf

== See also ==
- 1953–54 in Scottish football
