= Don Cornock =

Scottish footballer (1930–1969)

Personal information
- Full name: Donald Munroe Cornock
- Date of birth: 1 August 1930
- Date of death: 1969 (aged 39)
- Place of death: Coatbridge, Scotland
- Position: Wing half

Youth career
- Newarthill Hearts

Senior career*
Years	Team	Apps	(Gls)
1949–1952	Albion Rovers	44	(0)
1951–1954	Clyde	9	(2)
1953–1956	Dumbarton	46	(1)
1956–1957	Stranraer	3	(0)
1956–1957	Stirling Albion	6	(0)
- * Club domestic league appearances and goals

Donald Munroe Cornock (1 August 1930 – 1969) was a Scottish footballer who played for Albion Rovers, Clyde, Dumbarton, Stranraer and Stirling Albion.

Cornock died in Coatbridge in 1969, at the age of 39.
