= Ray Brown (American football, born 1936) =

American football player (1936–2017)

- Brown in 1960

No. 17
- Positions: Safety, quarterback

Personal information
- Born: September 7, 1936; Clarksdale, Mississippi, U.S.
- Died: December 25, 2017 (aged 81); Gautier, Mississippi, U.S.
- Listed height: 6 ft 2 in (1.88 m)
- Listed weight: 192 lb (87 kg)

Career information
- High school: Greenville (Greenville, Mississippi)
- College: Ole Miss
- NFL draft: 1958: 5th round, 50th overall pick

Career history
- Baltimore Colts (1958–1960)

Awards and highlights
- 2× NFL champion (1958, 1959); First-team All-SEC (1957)

Career NFL statistics
- Games played: 36
- Games started: 12
- Fumble recoveries: 4
- Interceptions: 13
- Stats at Pro Football Reference

Raymond Lloyd Brown (September 7, 1936 – December 25, 2017) was an American professional football player who was a defensive back and quarterback for the Baltimore Colts of the National Football League (NFL). After playing college football for the Ole Miss Rebels, he was selected by the Colts in the fifth round (50th overall) of the 1958 NFL draft. He played three seasons for Baltimore (1958–1960), and was a member of their back-to-back championship teams in 1958 and 1959.

In 1962, Brown graduated from the University of Mississippi School of Law, where he was associate editor of the Mississippi Law Journal. He then clerked for a year for U.S. Supreme Court Justice Tom C. Clark. Brown died on December 25, 2017, in Gautier, Mississippi, at age 81.

== See also ==
- List of law clerks for the tenth seat of the Supreme Court of the United States
