= 1950–51 Scottish Football League =

Scottish football season

Statistics of the Scottish Football League in season 1950–51.

== Scottish League Division A ==
Pos	Team	Pld	W	D	L	GF	GA	GD	Pts
1	Hibernian	30	22	4	4	78	26	+52	48
2	Rangers	30	17	4	9	64	37	+27	38
3	Dundee	30	15	8	7	47	30	+17	38
4	Heart of Midlothian	30	16	5	9	72	45	+27	37
5	Aberdeen	30	15	5	10	61	50	+11	35
6	Partick Thistle	30	13	7	10	57	48	+9	33
7	Celtic	30	12	5	13	48	46	+2	29
8	Raith Rovers	30	13	2	15	52	52	0	28
9	Motherwell	30	11	6	13	58	65	−7	28
10	East Fife	30	10	8	12	48	66	−18	28
11	St Mirren	30	9	7	14	35	51	−16	25
12	Morton	30	10	4	16	47	59	−12	24
13	Third Lanark	30	11	2	17	40	51	−11	24
14	Airdrieonians	30	10	4	16	52	67	−15	24
15	Clyde	30	8	7	15	37	57	−20	23
16	Falkirk	30	7	4	19	35	81	−46	18

Source: RSSSF

== Scottish League Division B ==
Pos	Team	Pld	W	D	L	GF	GA	GD	Pts	Promotion or relegation
1	Queen of the South	30	21	3	6	69	35	+34	45	Promotion to the 1951–52 Division A
2	Stirling Albion	30	21	3	6	78	44	+34	45	Promotion to the 1951–52 Division A
3	Ayr United	30	15	6	9	64	40	+24	36	
4	Dundee United	30	16	4	10	78	58	+20	36	
5	St Johnstone	30	14	5	11	68	53	+15	33	
6	Queen's Park	30	13	7	10	56	53	+3	33	
7	Hamilton Academical	30	12	8	10	65	49	+16	32	
8	Albion Rovers	30	14	4	12	56	51	+5	32	
9	Dumbarton	30	12	5	13	52	53	−1	29	
10	Dunfermline Athletic	30	12	4	14	58	73	−15	28	
11	Cowdenbeath	30	12	3	15	61	57	+4	27	
12	Kilmarnock	30	8	8	14	44	49	−5	24	
13	Arbroath	30	8	5	17	46	78	−32	21	
14	Forfar Athletic	30	9	3	18	43	76	−33	21	
15	Stenhousemuir	30	9	2	19	51	80	−29	20	
16	Alloa Athletic	30	7	4	19	58	98	−40	18	

Source: "1950-1951 Division B - SPFL Archive". SPFL.

== Scottish League Division C North East ==
Division C South East renamed Division C North East

Pos	Team	Pld	W	D	L	GF	GA	GR	Pts	Promotion or relegation
1	Heart of Midlothian II	30	21	6	3	76	32	2.375	48	
2	Aberdeen II	30	22	3	5	104	39	2.667	47	
3	Hibernian II	30	20	3	7	81	30	2.700	43	
4	Dundee II	30	15	6	9	81	48	1.688	36	
5	Brechin City	30	14	6	10	77	57	1.351	34	
6	Celtic II	30	15	4	11	58	44	1.318	34	
7	Dunfermline Athletic II	30	15	2	13	66	56	1.179	32	
8	Falkirk II	30	15	2	13	66	64	1.031	32	
9	Cowdenbeath II	30	15	1	14	56	64	0.875	31	Left the League
10	East Fife II	30	10	5	15	57	75	0.760	25	
11	St. Johnstone II	30	10	5	15	44	62	0.710	25	
12	Raith Rovers II	30	9	6	15	45	78	0.577	24	
13	Dundee United II	30	7	5	18	29	66	0.439	19	
14	Leith Athletic	30	6	5	19	43	73	0.589	17	
15	Alloa Athletic II	30	6	5	19	47	95	0.495	17	Left the League
16	Montrose	30	6	4	20	40	87	0.460	16	

Source: rsssf

== Scottish League Division C South West ==
Pos	Team	Pld	W	D	L	GF	GA	GR	Pts
1	Clyde II	30	22	2	6	82	37	2.216	46
2	Ayr United II	30	15	5	10	74	57	1.298	35
3	Rangers II	30	16	2	12	67	52	1.288	34
4	Partick Thistle II	30	12	10	8	63	52	1.212	34
5	Motherwell II	30	12	9	9	58	48	1.208	33
6	Stranraer	30	12	8	10	80	71	1.127	32
7	St Mirren II	30	12	8	10	56	54	1.037	32
8	Queen's Park II	30	12	4	14	53	52	1.019	28
9	Kilmarnock II	30	10	8	12	62	64	0.969	28
10	Third Lanark II	30	12	4	14	53	58	0.914	28
11	East Stirlingshire	30	11	6	13	57	66	0.864	28
12	Hamilton Academical II	30	12	3	15	54	69	0.783	27
13	Greenock Morton II	30	11	4	15	71	74	0.959	26
14	Airdrieonians II	30	10	5	15	49	76	0.645	25
15	Dumbarton II	30	9	6	15	49	76	0.645	24
16	Queen of the South II	30	6	8	16	38	60	0.633	20

Source: rsssf

== See also ==
- 1950–51 in Scottish football
