= 1952–53 Scottish Football League =

Scottish football season

Statistics of the Scottish Football League in season 1952–53.

== Scottish League Division A ==
| Pos | Team | Pld | W | D | L | GF | GA | GR | Pts |
|---|---|---|---|---|---|---|---|---|---|
| 1 | Rangers | 30 | 18 | 7 | 5 | 80 | 39 | 2.051 | 43 |
| 2 | Hibernian | 30 | 19 | 5 | 6 | 93 | 51 | 1.824 | 43 |
| 3 | East Fife | 30 | 16 | 7 | 7 | 72 | 48 | 1.500 | 39 |
| 4 | Heart of Midlothian | 30 | 12 | 6 | 12 | 59 | 50 | 1.180 | 30 |
| 5 | Clyde | 30 | 13 | 4 | 13 | 78 | 78 | 1.000 | 30 |
| 6 | St Mirren | 30 | 11 | 8 | 11 | 52 | 58 | 0.897 | 30 |
| 7 | Dundee | 30 | 9 | 11 | 10 | 44 | 37 | 1.189 | 29 |
| 8 | Celtic | 30 | 11 | 7 | 12 | 51 | 54 | 0.944 | 29 |
| 9 | Partick Thistle | 30 | 10 | 9 | 11 | 55 | 63 | 0.873 | 29 |
| 10 | Queen of the South | 30 | 10 | 8 | 12 | 43 | 61 | 0.705 | 28 |
| 11 | Aberdeen | 30 | 11 | 5 | 14 | 64 | 68 | 0.941 | 27 |
| 12 | Raith Rovers | 30 | 9 | 8 | 13 | 47 | 53 | 0.887 | 26 |
| 13 | Falkirk | 30 | 11 | 4 | 15 | 53 | 63 | 0.841 | 26 |
| 14 | Airdrieonians | 30 | 10 | 6 | 14 | 53 | 75 | 0.707 | 26 |
| 15 | Motherwell | 30 | 10 | 5 | 15 | 57 | 80 | 0.713 | 25 |
| 16 | Third Lanark | 30 | 8 | 4 | 18 | 52 | 75 | 0.693 | 20 |

Source: RSSSF

== Scottish League Division B ==
| Pos | Team | Pld | W | D | L | GF | GA | GD | Pts | Promotion or relegation |
|---|---|---|---|---|---|---|---|---|---|---|
| 1 | Stirling Albion | 30 | 20 | 4 | 6 | 64 | 43 | +21 | 44 | Promotion to the 1953–54 Division A |
| 2 | Hamilton Academical | 30 | 20 | 3 | 7 | 72 | 40 | +32 | 43 | Promotion to the 1953–54 Division A |
| 3 | Queen's Park | 30 | 15 | 7 | 8 | 70 | 46 | +24 | 37 | |
| 4 | Kilmarnock | 30 | 17 | 2 | 11 | 74 | 48 | +26 | 36 | |
| 5 | Ayr United | 30 | 17 | 2 | 11 | 76 | 56 | +20 | 36 | |
| 6 | Morton | 30 | 15 | 3 | 12 | 79 | 57 | +22 | 33 | |
| 7 | Arbroath | 30 | 13 | 7 | 10 | 52 | 57 | −5 | 33 | |
| 8 | Dundee United | 30 | 12 | 5 | 13 | 52 | 56 | −4 | 29 | |
| 9 | Alloa Athletic | 30 | 12 | 5 | 13 | 63 | 68 | −5 | 29 | |
| 10 | Dumbarton | 30 | 11 | 6 | 13 | 58 | 67 | −9 | 28 | |
| 11 | Dunfermline Athletic | 30 | 9 | 9 | 12 | 51 | 58 | −7 | 27 | |
| 12 | Stenhousemuir | 30 | 10 | 6 | 14 | 56 | 65 | −9 | 26 | |
| 13 | Cowdenbeath | 30 | 8 | 7 | 15 | 37 | 54 | −17 | 23 | |
| 14 | St Johnstone | 30 | 8 | 6 | 16 | 41 | 63 | −22 | 22 | |
| 15 | Forfar Athletic | 30 | 8 | 4 | 18 | 54 | 88 | −34 | 20 | |
| 16 | Albion Rovers | 30 | 5 | 4 | 21 | 44 | 77 | −33 | 14 | |

Source: "1952-1953 Division B - SPFL Archive". SPFL.

== Scottish League Division C North East ==
| Pos | Team | Pld | W | D | L | GF | GA | GR | Pts | Promotion or relegation |
|---|---|---|---|---|---|---|---|---|---|---|
| 1 | Aberdeen II | 28 | 21 | 3 | 4 | 81 | 44 | 1.841 | 45 | |
| 2 | Hibernian II | 28 | 17 | 4 | 7 | 87 | 43 | 2.023 | 38 | |
| 3 | Berwick Rangers | 28 | 13 | 10 | 5 | 70 | 34 | 2.059 | 36 | |
| 4 | Heart of Midlothian II | 28 | 16 | 4 | 8 | 72 | 45 | 1.600 | 36 | |
| 5 | Dundee II | 28 | 14 | 6 | 8 | 58 | 44 | 1.318 | 34 | |
| 6 | Falkirk II | 28 | 14 | 4 | 10 | 62 | 52 | 1.192 | 32 | |
| 7 | East Fife II | 28 | 14 | 3 | 11 | 55 | 56 | 0.982 | 31 | |
| 8 | Brechin City | 28 | 8 | 10 | 10 | 49 | 45 | 1.089 | 26 | |
| 9 | Raith Rovers II | 28 | 8 | 10 | 10 | 49 | 56 | 0.875 | 26 | |
| 10 | St. Johnstone II | 28 | 11 | 3 | 14 | 42 | 69 | 0.609 | 25 | Left the League |
| 11 | Celtic II | 28 | 11 | 2 | 15 | 48 | 56 | 0.857 | 24 | |
| 12 | Montrose | 28 | 8 | 2 | 18 | 74 | 113 | 0.655 | 18 | |
| 13 | Stirling Albion II | 28 | 7 | 3 | 18 | 80 | 103 | 0.777 | 17 | |
| 14 | Dunfermline Athletic II | 28 | 7 | 2 | 19 | 60 | 81 | 0.741 | 16 | |
| 15 | Leith Athletic | 28 | 5 | 6 | 17 | 41 | 87 | 0.471 | 16 | Left the League |

Source: rsssf

== Scottish League Division C South West ==
| Pos | Team | Pld | W | D | L | GF | GA | GR | Pts | Promotion or relegation |
|---|---|---|---|---|---|---|---|---|---|---|
| 1 | Rangers II | 26 | 19 | 1 | 6 | 70 | 28 | 2.500 | 39 | |
| 2 | Partick Thistle II | 26 | 15 | 7 | 4 | 48 | 26 | 1.846 | 37 | |
| 3 | Airdrieonians II | 26 | 16 | 4 | 6 | 63 | 36 | 1.750 | 36 | |
| 4 | Clyde II | 26 | 15 | 5 | 6 | 61 | 48 | 1.271 | 35 | |
| 5 | Ayr United II | 26 | 15 | 1 | 10 | 72 | 47 | 1.532 | 31 | |
| 6 | Motherwell II | 26 | 12 | 4 | 10 | 45 | 40 | 1.125 | 28 | |
| 7 | Stranraer | 26 | 9 | 5 | 12 | 55 | 58 | 0.948 | 23 | |
| 8 | Third Lanark II | 26 | 10 | 2 | 14 | 60 | 62 | 0.968 | 22 | |
| 9 | St Mirren II | 26 | 9 | 2 | 15 | 45 | 54 | 0.833 | 20 | |
| 10 | Queen of the South II | 26 | 9 | 1 | 16 | 55 | 65 | 0.846 | 19 | |
| 11 | Greenock Morton II | 26 | 8 | 3 | 15 | 53 | 75 | 0.707 | 19 | Left the League |
| 12 | Queen's Park II | 26 | 9 | 1 | 16 | 47 | 68 | 0.691 | 19 | |
| 13 | Kilmarnock II | 26 | 9 | 1 | 16 | 45 | 75 | 0.600 | 19 | |
| 14 | East Stirlingshire | 26 | 7 | 3 | 16 | 38 | 75 | 0.507 | 17 | |

Source: rsssf

== See also ==
- 1952–53 in Scottish football
