= Jim Maguire (footballer, born 1930) =

Scottish footballer (1930–2020)

Personal information
- Full name: James Smith Maguire
- Date of birth: 3 February 1930
- Place of birth: Eaglesham, Renfrewshire, Scotland
- Date of death: 2020 (aged 90)
- Place of death: Barrhead, Renfrewshire, Scotland
- Position: Left winger

Youth career
- Cambuslang Rangers

Senior career*
Years	Team	Apps	(Gls)
1953–1954	Dumbarton (trialist)	3	(2)
1954–1955	Ashfield		
1955–1958	Queen of the South	21	(2)
1958–1959	Rochdale	15	(0)
1959	Alloa Athletic	3	(0)
1959–1960	Coleraine		
1960	Brechin City	6	(1)
Total		48	(5)
- * Club domestic league appearances and goals

James Smith Maguire (3 February 1930 – 2020) was a Scottish footballer, who played for Dumbarton, Queen of the South, Rochdale, Alloa Athletic and Brechin City.

Maguire died in Barrhead, Renfrewshire in 2020, at the age of 90.
