= Tony Hepburn =

Scottish footballer

Personal information
- Full name: Anthony Hepburn
- Date of birth: 22 May 1932 (age 94)
- Position: Outside right

Youth career
- Clydebank

Senior career*
Years	Team	Apps	(Gls)
1951–1954	Celtic	6	(0)
1953–1954	Dumbarton	15	(6)
1954–1955	Ayr United	13	(5)
1957–1958	Morton	6	(0)
- * Club domestic league appearances and goals

Anthony Hepburn (born 22 May 1932) was a Scottish footballer who played for Celtic, Dumbarton, Ayr United and Morton.
