= Jock Weir =

Scottish footballer

Personal information
- Full name: John Britton Weir
- Date of birth: 20 October 1923
- Place of birth: Fauldhouse, Scotland
- Date of death: 7 January 2003 (aged 79)
- Place of death: Bellshill, Scotland
- Position: Outside right

Youth career
- –1942: Leith Renton

Senior career*
Years	Team	Apps	(Gls)
1942–1947	Hibernian	19	(14)
1947–1948	Blackburn Rovers	23	(7)
1948–1952	Celtic	81	(22)
1952–1953	Falkirk	15	(2)
1953	Llanelli		
1953–1954	Dumbarton	16	(5)
1954–	Portadown		
- * Club domestic league appearances and goals

John Britton Weir (20 October 1923 – 7 January 2003) was a Scottish professional football player, most notable for scoring a hat-trick for Celtic on the final day of the 1947–48 season that prevented the Glasgow club from being relegated.

== Career ==
Weir signed for Hibernian in 1942, but did not play league football until the 1946–47 season due to the Second World War. During the war, he had made guest appearances for Cardiff City and Brighton. Upon the resumption of league football in 1946, Weir enjoyed instant success, scoring four goals as Hibs won their first post-war league match 9–1 against Queen of the South. He had scored 14 goals in 19 league matches (and four goals in his only Scottish Cup appearance for Hibs) by the end of January 1947, but was allowed to join Blackburn for a fee of £10,000. This was perhaps because Hibs had the services of most of the Famous Five, which allowed the club to sell other talented players, including Weir, Leslie Johnston and Alex Linwood.

Weir was not such a great success with Blackburn, however, and was allowed to return to Scotland in 1948, signing for Celtic for a fee of £7,000. This transfer signalled a change of attitude by Celtic, who "had treated wartime football with contempt" and had passed up the opportunity to field guest players of international standing, including Matt Busby. Weir's arrival did not immediately arrest Celtic's decline, and the club entered the final day of the 1947–48 season with an outside chance of being relegated. This possibility was averted, however, as Celtic won their match 3–2 against Dundee at Dens Park, with Weir scoring a hat-trick. Weir then went on to score two goals in the Glasgow Cup final against Third Lanark that year. Normally that trophy would have been held in low esteem, but a crowd of 87,000 attended, realising the potential of the Celtic support. Weir was part of the Celtic team that won the 1950–51 Scottish Cup, beating Motherwell 1–0 in the final.

Journalist Bob Crampsey, who stated that Weir "was very, very fast", also wrote that he was an "unlucky" player, as he missed out on the positive effect that Jock Stein was to have on Celtic. Coincidentally, Weir later had a brief spell with Llanelli A.F.C., the Welsh club that Stein played for. Despite making 100 appearances for Celtic, Weir did not earn international honours due to stiff competition from several players, including Lawrie Reilly.

In his later life, Weir suffered from dementia, which family members believed was caused by his frequent heading of the ball during his football career; this was discussed during a BBC Scotland investigative television programme on the subject in 2000, also featuring another former Celtic forward Billy McPhail who was suffering from a similar condition.
