= Ray Brown (footballer) =

English footballer (1928–2005)

Personal information
- Full name: Raymond Moscrop Brown
- Date of birth: 11 February 1928
- Place of birth: Carlisle, England
- Date of death: 2005 (aged 76–77)
- Position: Winger

Senior career*
Years	Team	Apps	(Gls)
1946–1951	Queen's Park	57	(16)
1951–1952	Notts County	7	(0)
1952–1953	Third Lanark	13	(1)
1953–1954	Dumbarton	7	(0)
1957–1958	Dunfermline Athletic	19	(4)
1958–1959	Cowdenbeath	1	(0)
- * Club domestic league appearances and goals

Raymond Moscrop Brown ( 11 February 1928 – 2005) was an English footballer, who played for Queen's Park, Notts County, Third Lanark, Dumbarton, Dunfermline Athletic and Cowdenbeath.
