= Tom McGairy =

Scottish footballer

Thomas McGarry
Personal information
- Full name: Thomas McGarry
- Date of birth: 25 November 1927
- Place of birth: Glasgow, Scotland
- Date of death: 14 November 2002 (aged 74)
- Place of death: Seacroft, Leeds, England
- Position: Inside forward

Youth career
- Vale of Clyde

Senior career*
Years	Team	Apps	(Gls)
1949–1952	Dunfermline Athletic	40	(16)
1952–1953	Hamilton Academical	5	(1)
1953–1954	Dumbarton	16	(7)
1954–1955	Walsall	7	(1)
1955–1956	Dundee United	28	(13)
- * Club domestic league appearances and goals

Thomas McGarry (25 November 1927 – 14 November 2002) was a Scottish professional footballer, who played as an inside forward for Dunfermline Athletic, Hamilton Academical, Dumbarton, Walsall and Dundee United.
