= Walter Scott (footballer, born 1932) =

Scottish footballer

Personal information
- Full name: Walter Scott
- Date of birth: 23 June 1932
- Place of birth: Douglas, Scotland
- Date of death: 6 June 1988 (aged 55)
- Place of death: Stranraer, Scotland
- Position: Goalkeeper

Youth career
- Douglasdale

Senior career*
Years	Team	Apps	(Gls)
1950–1953	Falkirk	49	(0)
1953	Hamilton Academical	2	(0)
1953–1954	Dumbarton	13	(0)
1954–1955	Halifax Town	13	(0)
Total		77	(0)
- * Club domestic league appearances and goals

Walter Scott (23 June 1932 – 6 June 1988) was a Scottish footballer, who played for Falkirk, Hamilton Academical, Dumbarton and Halifax Town.
