= Jim Davie =

Scottish footballer

Personal information
- Full name: James Graham Davie
- Date of birth: 7 September 1922
- Place of birth: Cambuslang, Scotland
- Date of death: 31 January 1984 (aged 61)
- Place of death: Glasgow, Scotland
- Position: Left half

Youth career
- Bridgeton Waverley

Senior career*
Years	Team	Apps	(Gls)
1946–1948	Kilmarnock	49	(1)
1948–1949	Preston North End	28	(0)
1950–1951	Northampton Town	75	(1)
1953–1954	Shrewsbury Town	0	(0)
1953–1954	Dumbarton	11	(0)
- * Club domestic league appearances and goals

James Graham Davie (7 September 1922 – 31 January 1984) was a Scottish footballer who played for Kilmarnock, Preston North End, Northampton Town, Shrewsbury Town and Dumbarton.
