= Jimmy Scott (footballer, born 1927) =

Scottish footballer (1927–2020)

Personal information
- Full name: James John Wedderburn Scott
- Date of birth: 26 December 1927
- Place of birth: Glasgow, Scotland
- Date of death: March 2020 (aged 92)
- Place of death: Workington, England
- Position: Inside forward

Youth career
- Armadale Thistle

Senior career*
Years	Team	Apps	(Gls)
1951–1953	Dumbarton	43	(15)
1953–1954	Alloa Athletic	20	(0)
1954–1955	Workington	6	(1)
- * Club domestic league appearances and goals

James John Wedderburn Scott (26 December 1927 – March 2020) was a Scottish footballer who played for Dumbarton, Alloa Athletic and Workington.
