= Jack Cameron (footballer, born 1931) =

Scottish footballer

Personal information
- Full name: John Cameron
- Date of birth: 7 March 1931
- Place of birth: Dalmuir, Scotland
- Date of death: 15 July 1987 (aged 56)
- Place of death: Ayr, Scotland
- Position: Right back

Youth career
- Dalmuir Rovers

Senior career*
Years	Team	Apps	(Gls)
1950–1954	Dumbarton	4	(0)
1954–1960	Hartlepools	175	(0)
- * Club domestic league appearances and goals

Jack Cameron (7 March 1931 – 15 July 1987) was a Scottish footballer, who played for Dumbarton and Hartlepools.
