= Jimmy Frame =

Scottish footballer (1929–2013)

Personal information
- Full name: James Buchanan Frame
- Date of birth: 22 October 1929
- Date of death: 2013 (aged 83)
- Place of death: East Kilbride, Scotland
- Position: Forward

Youth career
- Clydebank

Senior career*
Years	Team	Apps	(Gls)
1948–1950	Rangers	1	(0)
1950–1953	Dumbarton	46	(21)
1953–1954	Worcester		
- * Club domestic league appearances and goals

James Buchanan Frame (22 October 1929 – 2013) was a Scottish footballer who played for Rangers, Dumbarton and Worcester.

Frame died in East Kilbride in 2013, at the age of 83.
