= Hugh Shaw (footballer, born 1929) =

Scottish footballer

Personal information
- Date of birth: 29 April 1929
- Place of birth: Clydebank, Scotland
- Date of death: 8 May 1985 (aged 56)
- Place of death: Clydebank, Scotland
- Position: Full back

Senior career*
Years	Team	Apps	(Gls)
- Duntocher Hibernian
1951–1954	Dumbarton	83	(8)
1954–1955	Rhyl		
1955–1956	Tranmere Rovers	3	(0)
1956–1958	Stranraer	70	(0)
Total		155	(7)
- * Club domestic league appearances and goals

Hugh Shaw (29 April 1929 – 8 May 1985) was a footballer who played as a full back in the Football League for Tranmere Rovers.
