= Tommy Irwin (footballer) =

Scottish footballer (1932–1979)

Personal information
- Full name: Thomas John Irwin
- Date of birth: 6 October 1932
- Place of birth: Dumbarton, Scotland
- Date of death: 12 April 1979 (aged 46)
- Place of death: Scotland
- Position: Half back

Youth career
- Denny's Juveniles

Senior career*
| Years | Team | Apps | (Gls) |
| 1950–1956 | Dumbarton | 55 | (8) |
| 1956–1957 | Darlington | | |
- * Club domestic league appearances and goals

Thomas John Irwin (6 October 1932 – 12 April 1979) was a Scottish footballer who played for Dumbarton and Darlington. He was born in Dumbarton, Scotland, on 6 October 1932. Irwin later lived in Cornwall. He died whilst on holiday in Scotland, on 12 April 1979, aged 46.
