= Jimmy Whyte =

Scottish footballer

Personal information
- Full name: Jimmy Whyte
- Position: Centre half

Youth career
- Dunipace

Senior career*
Years	Team	Apps	(Gls)
1950–1954	Dumbarton	98	(0)
- * Club domestic league appearances and goals

Jimmy Whyte was a Scottish footballer who played during the early 1950s. He started his career with junior side Dunipace before signing 'senior' with Dumbarton where he played for four seasons.
