= Tom Donegan =

Scottish footballer (1930–1994)

Thomas Donegan
Personal information
- Full name: Thomas Edward Donegan
- Date of birth: 8 April 1930
- Date of death: 1994 (aged 64)
- Place of death: Glasgow, Scotland
- Position: Forward

Senior career*
Years	Team	Apps	(Gls)
1946–1954	Dumbarton	172	(33)
1954–1956	Arbroath	55	(16)
- * Club domestic league appearances and goals

Thomas Edward Donegan (8 April 1930 – 1994) was a Scottish footballer who played for Dumbarton and Arbroath. Donegan died in Glasgow in 1994, at the age of 64.
