= 1949–50 Rangers F.C. season =

Rangers
1949–50 season
- Chairman: John F. Wilson
- Manager: Bill Struth
- Ground: Ibrox Park
- Scottish League Division One: 1st P30 W22 D6 L2 F58 A26 Pts50
- Scottish Cup: Winners
- League Cup: Semi-finals
- Top goalscorer: League: Willie Findlay (8); All: Willie Findlay (18)

The 1949–50 season was the 70th season of competitive football by Rangers.

== Overview ==
Rangers played a total of 47 competitive matches during the 1949–50 season. The side won the league with a one-point lead over second placed Hibernian, after winning 22 of the 30 matches. The side also recorded an unbeaten home record in the league.

In the cup competitions Rangers were successful. The Scottish Cup was won thanks to a 3–0 win over East Fife with goals from Willie Findlay and a brace from Willie Thornton. The club exited the League Cup at the semi-final stage to East Fife.

== Results ==
All results are written with Rangers' score first.

=== Scottish League Division A ===
Date	Opponent	Venue	Result	Attendance	Scorers
10 September 1949	Partick Thistle	H	2-0	60,000	Waddell, Findlay
24 September 1949	Celtic	H	4-0	64,000	Rutherford, Findlay, Waddell (pen), Williamson
15 October 1949	Falkirk	A	2-0	20,000	Williamson, Rutherford
22 October 1949	Hearts	H	1-0	50,000	Findlay
29 October 1949	Aberdeen	A	3-1	40,000	Findlay, Thornton, Rutherford
5 November 1949	Hibernian	A	0-1	51,500	
12 November 1949	St Mirren	H	1-0	45,000	Johnson
19 November 1949	Raith Rovers	A	3-1	24,800	Williamson (2), Thornton
26 November 1949	Stirling Albion	H	2-1	45,000	Thornton, Williamson
3 December 1949	Clyde	H	5-4	25,000	Thornton (2), Cox (2), Johnson
10 December 1949	Motherwell	A	0-4	28,000	
17 December 1949	Queen of the South	H	1-0	18,000	Thornton
24 December 1949	Partick Thistle	A	3-1	35,000	Johnson (2), Thornton
31 December 1949	Dundee	H	2-2	35,000	Thornton, Findlay
2 January 1950	Celtic	A	1-1	65,000	McCulloch
3 January 1950	Third Lanark	H	3-1	30,000	Thornton (2), Johnson
7 January 1950	East Fife	A	2-0	18,674	Williamson, Rutherford
14 January 1950	Falkirk	H	3-0	35,000	Young (pen), Rutherford, Williamson
21 January 1950	Hearts	A	1-0	49,000	Findlay
4 February 1950	Aberdeen	H	2-2	50,000	Young (2, 2 pen)
18 February 1950	St Mirren	A	2-1	40,000	Rutherford, Waddell
25 February 1950	Raith Rovers	H	2-0	35,000	Williamson, Waddell
4 March 1950	Stirling Albion	A	2-0	25,000	Williamson, Paton
18 March 1950	Motherwell	H	2-0	38,000	Findlay, Rutherford
25 March 1950	Queen of the South	A	2-1	18,000	Thornton, Williamson
8 April 1950	East Fife	H	2-2	40,000	Cox, Findlay
10 April 1950	Clyde	A	2-1	25,000	Rae, Cox
17 April 1950	Dundee	A	1-0	32,000	Duncanson
29 April 1950	Hibernian	H	0-0	101,209	
1 May 1950	Third Lanark	A	2-2	32,800	Williamson, Paton

=== Scottish Cup ===
Date	Round	Opponent	Venue	Result	Attendance	Scorers
28 January 1950	R1	Motherwell	A	4–2	32,000	Williamson, Paton, McCulloch, Findlay
11 February 1950	R2	Cowdenbeath	H	8-0	24,000	McCulloch (2), Williamson (2), Johnson (2), Paton, Rutherford
11 March 1950	QF	Raith Rovers	H	1-1	43,080	Findlay
15 March 1950	QF R	Raith Rovers	A	1-1	28,500	Williamson
27 March 1950	QF 2R	Raith Rovers	H	2-0	63,000	Findlay, Cox
1 April 1950	SF	Queen of the South	N	1-1	52,924	Rutherford
5 April 1950	SF R	Queen of the South	N	3-0	58,975	Williamson, Young (pen), Findlay
22 April 1950	F	East Fife	N	3-0	120,015	Thornton (2), Findlay

=== League Cup ===
Date	Round	Opponent	Venue	Result	Attendance	Scorers
13 August 1949	SR	Celtic	A	2–3	71,000	Waddell (pen), Thornton
17 August 1949	SR	St Mirren	H	5-1	50,000	Waddell (2, 1 pen), Rutherford, Findlay, Thornton
20 August 1949	SR	Aberdeen	H	4-2	50,000	Findlay (2), Duncanson (2)
27 August 1949	SR	Celtic	H	2-0	95,000	Findlay, Waddell
30 August 1949	SR	St Mirren	A	1-1	45,000	Duncanson
3 September 1949	SR	Aberdeen	A	1-1	43,000	Findlay
17 September 1949	QF L1	Cowdenbeath	H	2-3	46,670	Williamson, Marshall
21 September 1949	QF L2	Cowdenbeath	A	3-1	25,586	Cox (2), Rutherford
8 October 1949	SF	East Fife	N	1-2	74,507	Marshall

== Appearances ==
Player	Position	Appearances	Goals
(Scotland) Bobby Brown	GK	47	0
(Scotland) George Young	DF	47	4
(Scotland) Jock Shaw	DF	45	0
(Scotland) Ian McColl	DF	46	0
(Scotland) Willie Woodburn	DF	46	0
(Scotland) Sammy Cox	DF	47	7
(Scotland) William Waddell	MF	19	8
(Scotland) Willie Findlay	FW	36	18
(Scotland) Billy Williamson	FW	31	17
(Scotland) Jimmy Duncanson	FW	20	4
(South Africa) Johnny Hubbard	MF	2	0
(Scotland) Willie Rae	MF	12	1
(Scotland) Eddie Rutherford	MF	35	11
(Scotland) Willie Paton	MF	10	4
(Scotland) Willie Thornton	FW	29	15
(Scotland) Torrance Gillick	MF	3	0
(Scotland) Joe Johnson	FW	22	7
(Scotland) Willie McCulloch	MF	12	4
(Scotland) Dave Marshall	FW	3	2
(Scotland) Ian McIntyre	MF	2	0
(Scotland) John Lindsay	DF	3	0

== See also ==
- 1949–50 in Scottish football
- 1949–50 Scottish Cup
- 1949–50 Scottish League Cup
