= 1948–49 Rangers F.C. season =

Rangers
1948–49 season
- Chairman: John Wilson
- Manager: Bill Struth
- Ground: Ibrox Park
- Scottish League Division One: 1st P30 W20 D6 L4 F63 A32 Pts46
- Scottish Cup: Winners
- League Cup: Winners
- Top goalscorer: League: Willie Thornton (23); All: Willie Thornton (34)

The 1948–49 season was the 69th season of competitive football by Rangers

== Overview ==
Rangers played a total of 44 competitive matches during the 1948–49 season becoming the first club to win The Treble.

Rangers won the league by a single point over second placed Dundee, winning 20 of the 30 matches.

The Scottish Cup was won thanks to a 4–1 win over Clyde with goals from Billy Williamson, Jimmy Duncanson and a brace from George Young.

The club won the League Cup with a 2–0 win over Raith Rovers.

== Transfers ==
16 August 1948: Billy Arnison to Luton Town.

21 September 1948: Charlie Watkins to Luton Town.

== Results ==
All results are written with Rangers' score first.

=== Scottish League Division A ===
Date	Round	Venue	Result	Attendance	Scorers
14 Aug 1948	Motherwell	A	1–1	35,000	Thornton
18 Aug 1948	Falkirk	H	4–3	40,000	Gillick (2), Thornton, Findlay
21 Aug 1948	Celtic	A	1–0	50,000	Findlay
28 Aug 1948	Dundee	H	1–1	55,000	Findlay
1 Sep 1948	Partick Thistle	A	1–1	40,000	Thornton
4 Sep 1948	Third Lanark	H	2–1	35,000	Williamson, Duncanson
23 Oct 1948	Hearts	A	0–2	42,000	
6 Nov 1948	Hibernian	H	2–4	50,000	Thornton, Gillick
13 Nov 1948	St Mirren	A	2–0	40,000	Gillick, Waddell
27 Nov 1948	East Fife	A	2–1	20,737	Thornton, Duncanson
4 Dec 1948	Clyde	A	3–1	25,000	Thornton (2), Paton
11 Dec 1948	Morton	H	4–1	25,000	Thornton (2), Findlay, Rutherford
18 Dec 1948	Queen of the South	A	2–0	20,200	Thornton, Rutherford
25 Dec 1948	Falkirk	A	2–2	21,000	Paton, Waddell
1 Jan 1949	Celtic	H	4–0	95,000	Thornton, Duncanson (3)
3 Jan 1949	Dundee	A	1–3	39,000	Marshall
8 Jan 1949	Motherwell	H	2–0	55,000	Paton, Thornton
15 Jan 1949	Third Lanark	A	1–2	35,000	Thornton
29 Jan 1949	Partick Thistle	H	2–2	55,000	Thornton, Cox
12 Feb 1949	Aberdeen	A	2–0	42,000	Thornton, Paton
19 Feb 1949	Hibernian	A	1–0	50,000	Paton
26 Feb 1949	St Mirren	H	2–1	40,000	Thornton, Duncanson
19 Mar 1949	Clyde	H	4–1	50,000	Paton (2), Thornton, Duncanson
2 Apr 1949	Queen of the South	H	3–0	28,000	Thornton (2), Duncanson
5 Apr 1949	Hearts	H	2–1	45,000	Cox, Paton
13 Apr 1949	East Fife	H	3–1	35,000	Young (2, 2 pen), Paton
16 Apr 1949	Aberdeen	H	1–1	45,000	Duncanson
18 Apr 1949	Albion Rovers	H	3–1	16,000	Williamson, Waddell, Young (pen)
25 Apr 1949	Morton	A	1–0	40,000	Thornton
30 Apr 1949	Albion Rovers	A	4–1	15,000	Thornton (3), Duncanson

=== Scottish Cup ===
Date	Round	Opponent	Venue	Result	Attendance	Scorers
22 Jan 1949	R1	Elgin City	H	6–1	29,000	Thornton (2), Duncanson (2), Cox, Rutherford
5 Feb 1949	R2	Motherwell	A	3–0	31,000	Young (pen), Paton, Thornton
5 Mar 1949	QF	Partick Thistle	H	4–0	65,000	Thornton (2), Duncanson, Paton
26 Mar 1949	SF	East Fife	N	3–0	104,958	Thornton (3)
23 Apr 1949	F	Clyde	N	4–1	120,162	Young (2, 2 pen), Williamson, Duncanson

=== League Cup ===
Date	Round	Opponent	Venue	Result	Attendance	Scorers
11 Sep 1948	SR	Clyde	H	1–1	50,000	Findlay
18 Sep 1948	SR	Hibernian	A	0–0	47,000	
25 Sep 1948	SR	Celtic	A	1–3	65,000	Findlay
2 Oct 1948	SR	Clyde	A	3–1	27,000	Waddell (3, 2 pen)
9 Oct 1948	SR	Hibernian	H	1–0	76,466	Thornton
16 Oct 1948	SR	Celtic	H	2–1	105,000	Williamson, Waddell
30 Oct 1948	QF	St Mirren	H	1–0	50,000	Thornton
20 Nov 1948	SF	Dundee	N	4–1	50,996	Rutherford, McColl, Duncanson, Thornton
12 Mar 1949	F	Raith Rovers	N	2–0	57,450	Gillick, Paton

== Appearances ==
Player	Position	Appearances	Goals
(Scotland) Bobby Brown	GK	44	0
(Scotland) George Young	DF	42	6
(Scotland) Jock Shaw	DF	41	0
(Scotland) Ian McColl	DF	41	1
(Scotland) Willie Woodburn	DF	42	0
(Scotland) Sammy Cox	DF	43	3
(Scotland) William Waddell	MF	33	7
(Scotland) Willie Findlay	FW	16	6
(Scotland) Willie Thornton	FW	43	34
(Scotland) Jimmy Duncanson	FW	37	15
(Scotland) Jimmy Caskie	MF	2	0
(Scotland) Eddie Rutherford	MF	35	4
(Scotland) Torrance Gillick	MF	12	5
(Scotland) John Lindsay	DF	6	0
(Scotland) Jimmy Frame	MF	1	0
(Scotland) Dave Marshall	FW	6	1
(Scotland) Billy Williamson	FW	11	4
(Scotland) Willie Rae	MF	4	0
(Scotland) Willie Paton	MF	24	12
(Scotland) Willie Walmsley	MF	1	0

== See also ==
- 1948–49 in Scottish football
- 1948–49 Scottish Cup
- 1948–49 Scottish League Cup
