= 1947–48 Scottish Cup =

Tournament details
- Country: Scotland

Final positions
- Champions: Rangers
- Runners-up: Greenock Morton

The 1947–48 Scottish Cup was the 63rd staging of Scotland's most prestigious football knockout competition. The Cup was won by Rangers who defeated Greenock Morton in the replayed final.

== First round ==
Home team	Score	Away team
Albion Rovers	0 – 2	Hibernian
Arbroath	9 – 1	Babcock & Wilcox
Ayr United	1 – 2	Greenock Morton
Berwick Rangers	2 – 4	Cowdenbeath
Dundee	2 – 4	Heart of Midlothian
East Fife	2 – 0	Kilmarnock
Inverness Caledonian	1 – 6	Falkirk
Motherwell	2 – 2	Hamilton Academical
Queen of the South	1 – 0	Stenhousemuir
St Mirren	8 – 0	Shawfield Amateurs
Stranraer	0 – 1	Rangers
Clachnacuddin	0 – 2	St Johnstone

=== Replays ===
Home team	Score	Away team
Hamilton Academical	0 – 2	Motherwell

== Second round ==
Home team	Score	Away team
Airdrieonians	2 – 1	Heart of Midlothian
Alloa Athletic	0 – 1	Queen of the South
Celtic	3 – 0	Cowdenbeath
Clyde	2 – 1	Dunfermline Athletic
East Fife	5 – 1	St Johnstone
Hibernian	4 – 0	Arbroath
Montrose	2 – 0	Duns
Greenock Morton	3 – 2	Falkirk
Motherwell	1 – 0	Third Lanark
Nithsdale Wanderers	0 – 5	Aberdeen
Partick Thistle	4 – 3	Dundee United
Peterhead	1 – 2	Dumbarton
Queen's Park	8 – 2	Deveronvale
Rangers	4 – 0	Leith Athletic
St Mirren	2 – 0	East Stirlingshire
Stirling Albion	2 – 4	Raith Rovers

== Third round ==
Home team	Score	Away team
Airdrieonians	3 – 0	Raith Rovers
Celtic	1 – 0	Motherwell
Dumbarton	0 – 1	East Fife
Hibernian	4 – 2	Aberdeen
Montrose	2 – 1	Queen of the South
Greenock Morton	3 – 0	Queen's Park
Rangers	3 – 0	Partick Thistle
St Mirren	2 – 1	Clyde

== Quarter-finals ==
Home team	Score	Away team
Airdrieonians	0 – 3	Greenock Morton
Celtic	4 – 0	Montrose
Hibernian	3 – 1	St Mirren
Rangers	1 – 0	East Fife

== Semi-finals ==
27 March 1948

Greenock Morton	1–0 (a.e.t.)	Celtic

Attendance: 80,000

27 March 1948

Rangers	1–0	Hibernian
Thornton

Hampden Park
Attendance: 143,570

== Final ==
17 April 1948

Rangers	1–1 (a.e.t.)	Greenock Morton
Gillick	Soccerbase	Whyte

Hampden Park, Glasgow
Attendance: 129,176

=== Teams ===
RANGERS:
GK	(Scotland) Bobby Brown
RB	(Scotland) George Young
LB	(Scotland) Jock Shaw
RH	(Scotland) Ian McColl
CH	(Scotland) Willie Woodburn
LH	(Scotland) Sammy Cox
RW	(Scotland) Eddie Rutherford
IR	(Scotland) Torrance Gillick
CF	(Scotland) Willie Thornton
IL	(Scotland) Willie Findlay
LW	(Scotland) Jimmy Duncanson
Manager:
(Scotland) Bill Struth

GREENOCK MORTON:
GK	(Scotland) Jimmy Cowan
RB	(Scotland) Jimmy Mitchell
LB	(Scotland) John Whigham
RH	(Scotland) Billy Campbell
CH	(Scotland) Alex Millar
LH	(Scotland) Jimmy Whyte
RW	(Scotland) John Hepburn
IR	(Scotland) Eddie Murphy
CF	(Scotland) Davie Cupples
IL	(Scotland) Tommy Orr
LW	(Scotland) Colin Liddell
Manager:
(Scotland) Jimmy Davies

== Final (replay) ==
21 April 1948

Rangers	1–0 (a.e.t.)	Greenock Morton
Williamson	Soccerbase

Hampden Park, Glasgow
Attendance: 133,750

=== Teams ===
RANGERS:
GK	(Scotland) Bobby Brown
RB	(Scotland) George Young
LB	(Scotland) Jock Shaw
RH	(Scotland) Ian McColl
CH	(Scotland) Willie Woodburn
LH	(Scotland) Sammy Cox
RW	(Scotland) Eddie Rutherford
IR	(Scotland) Torrance Gillick
CF	(Scotland) Willie Thornton
IL	(Scotland) Billy Williamson
LW	(Scotland) Jimmy Duncanson
Manager:
(Scotland) Bill Struth

GREENOCK MORTON:
GK	(Scotland) Jimmy Cowan
RB	(Scotland) Jimmy Mitchell
LB	(Scotland) John Whigham
RH	(Scotland) Billy Campbell
CH	(Scotland) Alex Millar
LH	(Scotland) Jimmy Whyte
RW	(Scotland) John Hepburn
IR	(Scotland) Eddie Murphy
CF	(Scotland) Davie Cupples
IL	(Scotland) Tommy Orr
LW	(Scotland) Colin Liddell
Manager:
(Scotland) Jimmy Davies

== See also ==
- 1947–48 in Scottish football
- 1947–48 Scottish League Cup

Played between the same teams:

- 1922 Scottish Cup Final
- 1963 Scottish League Cup Final
