= Alex Millar (footballer) =

Scottish association football player

Personal information
- Full name: Alexander Millar
- Birth name: Alexander Urbonis
- Date of birth: 21 October 1911
- Place of birth: Mossend, Scotland
- Date of death: 28 January 1977 (aged 65)
- Place of death: Bellshill, Scotland
- Position: Centre half

Senior career*
Years	Team	Apps	(Gls)
–	Mossend Celtic		
1933–1934	Parkhead		
1934–1935	Shawfield		
1935–1938	Celtic	10	(0)
1938–1946	Preston North End		
1946–1947	Dundee United	25	(0)
1947–1949	Morton		
1949–1950	Stranraer		
- * Club domestic league appearances and goals

Alexander Millar (21 October 1911 – 28 January 1977) was a Scottish footballer who played as a centre half.

== Career ==
Born with the surname Urbonis, Millar was a member of North Lanarkshire's Lithuanian immigrant community. After playing with several local Junior teams until the age of 23, he began his senior career with Celtic in 1935, where he was a reserve behind Willie Lyon in the queue for selection; he made five appearances as the club won the 1937–38 Scottish Division One title, but it is doubtful that he would have been presented with a medal. With the situation unchanged going into the following campaign he moved on, joining Preston North End in October 1938. He had little time to become established in English football prior to the outbreak of World War II ten months later, and during the conflict he appeared as a guest player for Scottish clubs including Celtic and Motherwell, featuring for the latter in the 1945 Southern League Cup Final which ended in defeat by Rangers.

In 1946 Millar signed for Scottish Division B side Dundee United, transferring back up to the top tier with Morton in late 1947 and playing for them in the 1948 Scottish Cup Final – again losing out to Rangers, this time after extra time in a replay; his performance in both matches against his internationalist opponents Billy Williamson and Willie Thornton, at the age of 36, was singled out for particular praise in press reports. After Morton were relegated in the 1948–49 season, he moved on to Stranraer for a short spell prior to retiring.

Millar also served as chairman of the Scottish Football Players Union in the post-war period. He was the first of several Scots of Lithuanian descent to play for Celtic between the 1930s and 1960s, all of them defenders, the most famous being Billy McNeill.
