= Ian McColl =

Scottish footballer and manager

Personal information
- Full name: John Miller McColl
- Date of birth: 7 June 1927
- Place of birth: Alexandria, Scotland
- Date of death: 25 October 2008 (aged 81)
- Place of death: Glasgow, Scotland
- Position: Defender

Youth career
- Vale of Leven
- 1943–1945: Queen's Park

Senior career*
| Years | Team | Apps | (Gls) |
| 1945–1960 | Rangers | 362 | (12) |

International career
| 1950–1958 | Scotland | 14 | (0) |
| 1952–1958 | Scottish League XI | 7 | (3) |
| 1958 | SFL trial v SFA | 1 | (0) |

Managerial career
- 1960–1965: Scotland
- 1965–1968: Sunderland
- 1967: Vancouver Royal Canadians
- * Club domestic league appearances and goals

John Miller "Ian" McColl (7 June 1927 – 25 October 2008) was a Scottish football player and manager. He played as a defender for Queen's Park and Rangers, while he also represented both the Scotland national team and the Scottish League. After retiring as a player, he managed the Scotland national team and English club Sunderland.

== Early life ==
Born in Alexandria, West Dunbartonshire, the grandson of Scotland international William McColl, McColl developed his footballing skills with Vale of Leven (Juniors), and joined Queen's Park in 1943 when he moved to Glasgow to study engineering at the University of Glasgow. He continued his studies after turning professional and later worked as a qualified engineer.

== Playing career ==
Rangers manager Bill Struth signed McColl in 1945. During his 15-year spell at Ibrox, he won six League championships, five Scottish Cups and two League Cups. He captained the club during the 1950s and was part of what was known as the Iron Curtain defence, alongside the likes of Sammy Cox, Willie Woodburn and George Young.

His final appearance for Rangers was in the 1960 Scottish Cup Final, a 2–0 win against Kilmarnock. He made a total of 575 appearances for the Glasgow club in all competitions. He also won 14 caps for Scotland and represented the Scottish League XI.

== Managerial career ==
After his playing career, he quickly went into management. He was appointed manager of Scotland in 1960 and enjoyed a winning start, beating Northern Ireland 5–2 at Hampden Park. Under McColl's managership, Scotland won British Home Championships in 1962 and 1963. The team beat England 2–0 at Hampden and 2–1 at Wembley in the process. Other notable results under his tenure include a 6–2 win against Spain in Madrid, a 6–1 win over Northern Ireland in Belfast and a 6–1 win over Norway in Glasgow. He was in charge of Scotland for a total of 27 matches, winning 16 of them. This gave him a winning percentage of 59.3%, the second best of any Scotland manager.

McColl was appointed manager of Sunderland in 1965. Despite signing Jim Baxter, McColl was unable to make Sunderland into a successful side. He was sacked by Sunderland in 1968 and spent the rest of his working life as a civil engineer.

== Honours ==
=== Player ===
Rangers

- Scottish league champions (7): 1946–47; 1948–49; 1949–50; 1952–53; 1955–56; 1956–57; 1958–59
- Scottish Cup winners (4): 1947-48, 1948–49, 1949–50, 1952–53, 1959–60
- Scottish League Cup winners: 1946–47, 1948–49

=== Manager ===
Scotland

- British Home Championship winners: 1962; 1963

== Career statistics ==
=== International appearances ===
Scotland national team
| Year | Apps | Goals |
|---|---|---|
| 1950 | 4 | 0 |
| 1951 | 1 | 0 |
| 1956 | 3 | 0 |
| 1957 | 5 | 0 |
| 1958 | 1 | 0 |
| Total | 14 | 0 |

=== Managerial record ===
As of 28 March 2015

| Team | Nat | From | To | Record | | | | |
| Team | Nat | From | To | G | W | D | L | Win % |
|---|---|---|---|---|---|---|---|---|
| Scotland | (Scotland) | 1960 | 1965 | 28 | 17 | 3 | 8 | 60.71 |
| Sunderland | (England) | 1965 | 1968 | 124 | 39 | 27 | 58 | 31.45 |
