= William J. Paton =

Scottish footballer

William Paton (died 2002) was a Scottish footballer who played for Bo'ness United, Motherwell and Yeovil Town. He should not be confused with his namesake Willie Paton, a striker who played for Rangers around the same time.

He made eleven appearances for Motherwell between 1947 and 1950, scoring one goal.
