= Jimmy Cowan (footballer) =

Scottish footballer (1926–1968)

Personal information
- Full name: James Clews Cowan
- Date of birth: 16 June 1926
- Place of birth: Paisley, Scotland
- Date of death: 20 June 1968 (aged 42)
- Place of death: Greenock, Scotland
- Position: Goalkeeper

Senior career*
Years	Team	Apps	(Gls)
19??–1944	St Mirren		
1944–1953	Morton	141	(0)
1953–1955	Sunderland	28	(0)
1955–1956	Third Lanark	6	(0)

International career
1948–1951	Scotland	25	(0)
1949–1953	Scottish League XI	3	(0)
- * Club domestic league appearances and goals

James Clews Cowan (16 June 1926 – 20 June 1968) was a Scottish football goalkeeper who played for St Mirren, Morton, Sunderland, Third Lanark and the Scotland national team.

== Career ==
Cowan was born in Paisley and began his professional career with St Mirren before moving to Morton in 1944. He remained at Cappielow for nine years, playing in the 1948 Scottish Cup Final defeat to Rangers. During his time at Morton he won all of his 25 Scotland caps, making his debut against Belgium in April 1948. He played in the 1949 and 1951 wins against England at Wembley, results which ultimately won Scotland the 1948–49 and 1950-51 British Home Championships.

During his time at Morton, the club were twice relegated from the First Division (1948–49 and 1951–52). After the club failed to win promotion in 1952–53, Cowan was transferred to English club Sunderland in June 1953. He returned to Scotland two years later with Third Lanark and played for a season at Cathkin Park before retiring.

On 11 November 2007, Cowan was posthumously inducted into the Scottish Football Hall of Fame.

== Personal life ==
His son Ronnie Cowan is a Scottish National Party (SNP) politician, who was elected at the 2015 UK general election as the Member of Parliament (MP) for Inverclyde.

== Career statistics ==
=== International appearances ===
Scotland national team
Year	Apps	Goals
1948	4	0
1949	4	0
1950	7	0
1951	7	0
1952	3	0
Total	25	0
