= 1927–28 Rangers F.C. season =

Rangers
1927–28 season
- Chairman: Joseph Buchanan
- Manager: Bill Struth
- Ground: Ibrox Park
- Scottish League Division One: 1st P38 W26 D8 L4 F109 A36 Pts60
- Scottish Cup: Winners

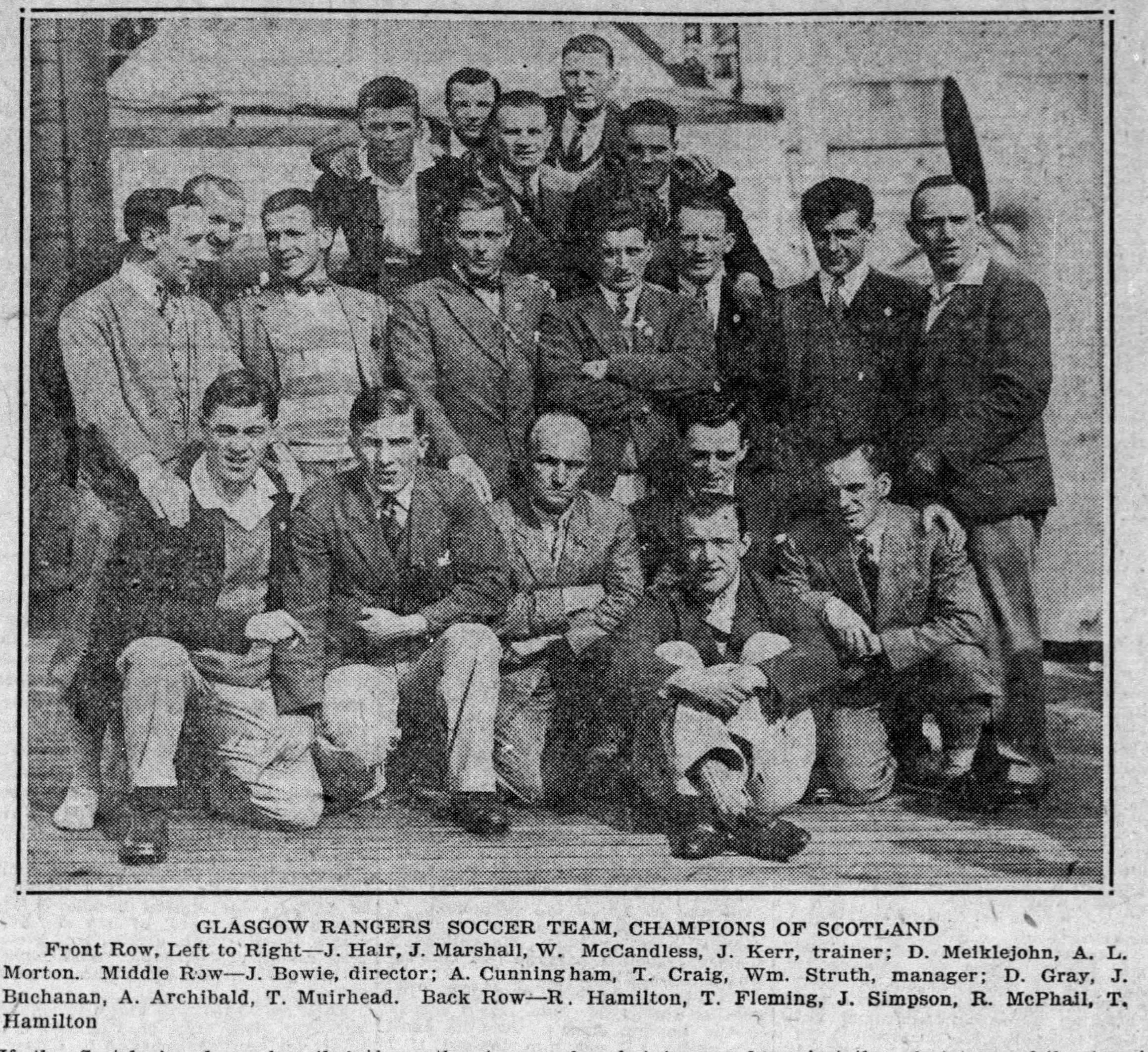
Photo of Rangers F.C. team members after they achieved a double in 1928

The 1927–28 season was the 54th season of competitive football by Rangers.

== Results ==
All results are written with Rangers' score first.

=== Scottish League Division One ===
Date	Opponent	Venue	Result	Attendance	Scorers
13 August 1927	Aberdeen	A	3–2	25,000	
20 August 1927	Heart of Midlothian	H	4–1	25,000	
27 August 1927	Cowdenbeath	A	4–1	12,000	
3 September 1927	St Johnstone	H	5–1	25,000	
10 September 1927	Partick Thistle	A	6–0	45,000	
17 September 1927	Airdrieonians	H	2–1	37,000	
24 September 1927	Motherwell	A	1–1	30,000	
1 October 1927	St Mirren	H	4–2	30,000	
15 October 1927	Celtic	H	1–0	60,000	
22 October 1927	Raith Rovers	H	7–0	7,000	
29 October 1927	Queen's Park	A	1–3	17,000	
5 November 1927	Dunfermline Athletic	A	5–0	9,000	
12 November 1927	Hibernian	H	4–1	15,000	
19 November 1927	Falkirk	A	2–1	15,000	
26 November 1927	Clyde	A	4–1	18,000	
3 December 1927	Hamilton Academical	A	1–1	15,000	
10 December 1927	Dundee	H	5–1	7,000	
17 December 1927	Kilmarnock	A	1–1	14,440	
24 December 1927	Aberdeen	H	5–0	14,000	
31 December 1927	St Johnstone	A	1–0	10,000	
2 January 1928	Celtic	A	0–1	70,000	
3 January 1928	Partick Thistle	H	2–1	20,000	
7 January 1928	Cowdenbeath	H	2–2	14,000	
14 January 1928	Airdrieonians	A	7–2	8,000	
28 January 1928	Bo'ness	H	3–1	12,000	
11 February 1928	Motherwell	H	0–2	45,000	
14 February 1928	St Mirren	A	3–3	15,000	
28 February 1928	Queen's Park	H	4–0	10,000	
7 March 1928	Heart of Midlothian	A	0–0	19,000	
17 March 1928	Hibernian	A	1–2	18,000	
26 March 1928	Falkirk	H	4–0	12,000	
31 March 1928	Clyde	H	3–1	18,000	
2 April 1928	Raith Rovers	A	0–0	8,000	
7 April 1928	Hamilton Academical	H	3–1	15,000	
9 April 1928	Dunfermline Athletic	H	4–0	10,000	
18 April 1928	Dundee	A	1–0	12,000	
21 April 1928	Kilmarnock	H	5–1	28,000	
28 April 1928	Bo'ness	A	1–1	4,000	

=== Scottish Cup ===
Date	Round	Opponent	Venue	Result	Attendance	Scorers
21 January 1928	R1	East Stirlingshire	A	6–0	5,500	
4 February 1928	R2	Cowdenbeath	H	4–2	30,226	
18 February 1928	R3	King's Park	H	3–1	16,000	
3 March 1928	R4	Albion Rovers	A	1–0	24,000	
24 March 1928	SF	Hibernian	N	3–0	43,129	
14 April 1928	F	Celtic	N	4–0	118,115	

== See also ==
- 1927–28 in Scottish football
- 1927–28 Scottish Cup
