= Colin Liddell =

Scottish footballer (1925–1997)

Personal information
- Date of birth: 10 June 1925
- Place of birth: Glasgow, Scotland
- Date of death: 1997 (aged 71)
- Place of death: Kilmarnock, Scotland
- Position: Left winger

Senior career*
Years	Team	Apps	(Gls)
1946–1947	Queen's Park	17	(6)
1947–1949	Greenock Morton		
1949–1951	Heart of Midlothian	14	(1)
1951–1955	Rangers	34	(8)
1955	Greenock Morton		
1955–1956	Stirling Albion	13	(0)
Total		78	(15)
- * Club domestic league appearances and goals

Colin Liddell (10 June 1925 – 1997) was a Scottish footballer who played for Queen's Park, Greenock Morton, Heart of Midlothian, Rangers and Stirling Albion.

Liddell played for Morton in the 1948 Scottish Cup Final. He was transferred to Heart of Midlothian for £10,000 in 1949, then moved to Rangers in 1951 in a swap for Eddie Rutherford.
