= Tommy Orr =

Scottish footballer

Personal information
- Full name: Thomas Bingham Orr
- Date of birth: 21 April 1924
- Place of birth: Greenock, Scotland
- Date of death: 20 June 1972 (aged 48)
- Position: Inside forward

Senior career*
Years	Team	Apps	(Gls)
1946–1958	Greenock Morton	257	(86)

International career
1951	Scotland	2	(1)
- * Club domestic league appearances and goals

Thomas Bingham Orr (21 April 1924 – 20 June 1972) was a Scottish footballer, who played as an inside forward for Greenock Morton.

Playing for Morton Juniors, Orr appeared in the 1940 Scottish Junior Cup Final alongside Nelson Black. Morton lost 1–0 to Maryhill.

As well as his 86 goals in 257 league appearances for Greenock Morton, Orr totalled 18 in 56 in the League Cup. He also scored three times in 28 Scottish Cup matches, and was a member of the side that reached the final in 1948.

Orr was capped for the Scotland national team twice, against Wales and Northern Ireland, both in 1951. He scored the first goal against Northern Ireland in a 3–0 win.

Orr retired from football in 1958. His son Neil Orr also became a professional footballer.

== See also ==
- List of one-club men in association football
