= Torry Gillick =

Scottish footballer

Personal information
- Full name: Torrance Gillick
- Date of birth: 19 May 1915
- Place of birth: Airdrie, Scotland
- Date of death: 16 December 1971 (aged 56)
- Place of death: Glasgow
- Height: 5 ft 7 1/2 in (1.71 m)
- Positions: Outside right; inside right

Senior career*
Years	Team	Apps	(Gls)
- Petershill
1933–1935	Rangers	46	(34)
1935–1945	Everton	119	(40)
1945–1950	Rangers	58	(25)
1951–1952	Partick Thistle	7	(1)
Total		230	(100)

International career
1937–1938	Scotland	5	(2)
1940–1943	Scotland (wartime)	4	(1)
1947–1948	Scottish League XI	3	(1)
- * Club domestic league appearances and goals

Torrance Gillick (19 May 1915 – 16 December 1971) was a Scottish footballer who played as a winger for Rangers, Everton and Partick Thistle, and for the Scotland national team.

== Club career ==
Born in Airdrie, Gillick was signed for Rangers in 1933, aged 18, by manager Bill Struth, after playing for prominent Glasgow junior club Petershill. In his first spell with the club, he won the Scottish League and Scottish Cup in 1934–35, and that summer was sold to Everton for a then record fee for the club, £8,000.

He stayed on Merseyside until the Second World War and during that time won a Football League championship medal in 1939.

During World War II, Gillick "guested" for home-town Airdrieonians and Rangers. At the end of the war in 1945, Struth brought him back to Ibrox. He developed into a forward with excellent ball control and vision and became a feature in the famous post-war Rangers side, forming a partnership on the right wing with Willie Waddell. In his second spell at Rangers, he won one League Championship medal (1946–47), a Scottish Cup in 1947–48 and two League Cup medals (1946–47, 1948–49) in addition to several wartime competitions. By coincidence, the last trophy he lifted was the Glasgow Cup with a win over Clyde in October 1949, the same tournament and opponent the first cup he won with Rangers 16 years earlier.

Gillick left Rangers in 1950 but made a comeback Partick Thistle in August 1951. He played one season with the Jags (managed at that time by his former Rangers teammate Davie Meiklejohn) before retiring to oversee his business interest, a Lanarkshire scrap metal firm. He died on 12 December 1971, aged 56, from undisclosed causes, on the same day as Alan Morton, also a retired Rangers player.

== International ==
Gillick was capped five times by Scotland between May 1937 and November 1938. He also played in four unofficial wartime international matches, and was selected three times for the Scottish Football League XI in the late 1940s once he returned to Rangers.
