= Rangers Charity Foundation =

Scottish charity for education and inclusion

The Rangers Charity Foundation
- Founded: 2002
- Founder: Rangers Football Club
- Type: Not-for-profit
- Purpose: Education, children and social inclusion
- Location: Glasgow, Scotland
- Region served: Scotland
- Revenue: GBP 100,000
- Website: www.rangerscharity.org.uk

The Rangers Charity Foundation is a Foundation (non-profit) and registered charity in Scotland.

== History ==
The Rangers Charity Foundation (Scottish Charity Number SC033287) exists to bring Club, supporters, staff and players together in a unique way to help make the world of difference to thousands of lives through a range of charitable work.

The charity has worked with partners including Glasgow Old People's Welfare Association, Teenage Cancer Trust and UNICEF. The Foundation also tries to help other charities when possible, specifically those with interests in the following:

- The needs of children
- Education
- Social Inclusion
- Tolerance and understanding of the beliefs of all sectors of the community
- Health and well-being

The Rangers Charity Foundation also arranges the opportunity for sick, disabled and disadvantaged children to meet the players, take tours and view matches.

== Controversy ==
In 2013, the Scottish Charity Regulator criticised trustees of the Rangers Charity Foundation after some of the cash raised from specially arranged football match went to the football club instead of the Foundation. The fundraising game between Rangers Legends and AC Milan Glorie took place after the club entered administration. Due to the club's financial uncertainty there were doubts that the game would go ahead, so trustees gave the club control of match income - a decision which cut the charity's profit share by £191,430. The Regulator said the decision making of trustees "constituted misconduct", however, it decided not to take action against any of the trustees.

== Financial information ==
Since the Foundation's creation in 2002 it has donated over £1.4 million in cash awards and over £2.1 million of in-kind support to hundreds of groups and individuals. In 2024 the Foundation reported accumulated donations of over £6.6 million.
