= Willie Paton =

Scottish footballer

Personal information
- Date of birth: 1 August 1925
- Place of birth: Glasgow, Scotland
- Date of death: 2005 (aged 79–80)
- Position: Forward

Senior career*
| Years | Team | Apps | (Gls) |
| – | Kirkintilloch Rob Roy | | |
| 1943–1956 | Rangers | 110 | (40) |
| 1956–1962 | Ayr United | 114 | (12) |
| Total | | 224 | (52) |
- * Club domestic league appearances and goals

William Paton (1 August 1925 – 2005) was a Scottish footballer who played for Rangers and Ayr United. He played as a forward.

Paton joined Rangers from junior side Kirkintilloch Rob Roy in 1943 during World War II, but did not make his competitive debut until September 1947. During his spell at Ibrox he made 175 appearances across all competitions and scored 75 goals. He was part of the squad in the 'treble' season of 1948–49. He collected two League championship winner's medals, one in the Scottish Cup (1953), one in the Scottish League Cup and two in the Glasgow Cup.

He should not be confused with his namesake William J. Paton, a wing-half who played for Motherwell around the same time.
