= Jimmy Mitchell =

Scottish footballer and manager (1924–2004)

Personal information
- Date of birth: 22 October 1924
- Place of birth: Glasgow, Scotland
- Date of death: 11 March 2004 (aged 79)
- Place of death: Glasgow, Scotland
- Height: 5 ft 9 1/2 in (1.77 m)
- Position: Right back

Senior career*
Years	Team	Apps	(Gls)
1942–1947	Queen's Park	21	(0)
1947–1952	Morton		
1952–1958	Aberdeen	129	(0)
1958–1959	Cowdenbeath		

International career
1955	Scottish League XI	1	(0)

Managerial career
- 1958–1959: Cowdenbeath
- * Club domestic league appearances and goals

Jimmy Mitchell (22 October 1924 – 11 March 2004) was a Scottish footballer, who played for Queen's Park, Morton, Aberdeen and was player/manager of Cowdenbeath. Mitchell also represented the Scottish League XI once.

Mitchell cost Aberdeen £7000 from Morton, which was one of their most expensive signings at the time. This price was worth it, however, with Mitchell leading Aberdeen to their first League Championship in 1955 and the League Cup the following season as captain.

== Career statistics ==
=== Club ===
Appearances and goals by club, season and competition
Club	Season	League			Scottish Cup		League Cup		Europe		Total	
Club	Season	Division	Apps	Goals	Apps	Goals	Apps	Goals	Apps	Goals	Apps	Goals
Queen's Park	1946–47	Scottish Division One	21	0	2	0	0	0	0	0	23	0
Aberdeen	1952–53	Scottish Division One	29	0	9	0	5	0	0	0	43	0
Aberdeen	1953–54	Scottish Division One	26	0	5	0	6	0	0	0	37	0
Aberdeen	1954–55	Scottish Division One	29	0	5	0	6	0	0	0	40	0
Aberdeen	1955–56	Scottish Division One	24	0	0	0	10	0	0	0	34	0
Aberdeen	1956–57	Scottish Division One	19	0	2	0	6	0	0	0	27	0
Aberdeen	1957–58	Scottish Division One	2	0	0	0	1	0	0	0	3	0
Aberdeen	Total		129	0	21	0	34	0	0	0	184	0
Career total			150	0	23	0	34	0	0	0	207	0

=== Managerial ===
Managerial record by team and tenure
Team	From	To	Record				
Team	From	To	P	W	L	D	Win %
Cowdenbeath	1958	1959	46	18	21	7	39.13%
