= John Lindsay (footballer, born 1924) =

Scottish footballer (1924–1991)

Jack Lindsay
Personal information
- Full name: John Smith Lindsay
- Date of birth: 8 August 1924
- Place of birth: Auchinairn, Scotland
- Date of death: December 1991 (aged 67)
- Place of death: Liverpool, England
- Position: Defender

Senior career*
Years	Team	Apps	(Gls)
1946–1951	Rangers	17	(0)
1951–1954	Everton	105	(2)
1954–1956	Worcester City		
1956–1957	Bury	7	(0)
1957–1958	South Liverpool		
- * Club domestic league appearances and goals

John Smith Lindsay (8 August 1924 – December 1991) was a Scottish footballer who played for Rangers, Everton, Worcester City and Bury.
