= Billy Campbell (footballer, born 1920) =

Scottish footballer (1920–1994)

Personal information
- Full name: William Bowie Campbell
- Date of birth: 26 July 1920
- Place of birth: Greenock, Scotland
- Date of death: 1994 (aged 74)
- Place of death: Greenock, Scotland
- Position: Wing half

Senior career*
Years	Team	Apps	(Gls)
1939–1941	Morton Juniors		
1941–1949	Morton	55	(10)
Total		55	(10)

International career
1943–1946	Scotland (wartime)	5	(0)
1946–1948	Scotland	5	(0)
1948	Scottish League XI	1	(0)
- * Club domestic league appearances and goals

William Bowie Campbell (26 July 1920 – 1994) was a Scottish footballer who played as a wing half.

At senior club level he played solely for Morton, his hometown team, but was forced to retire due to ill health in January 1949, only eight months after he took part in the 1948 Scottish Cup Final, lost to Rangers after a replay.

Campbell represented Scotland five times (missing out on a sixth cap when his only pair of boots broke just prior to a match against France in Paris); he also featured in five unofficial wartime internationals.
