= George Young (Scottish footballer) =

Scottish footballer

Personal information
- Full name: George Lewis Young
- Date of birth: 27 October 1922
- Place of birth: Grangemouth, Scotland
- Date of death: 10 January 1997 (aged 74)
- Place of death: Slamannan, Scotland
- Height: 6 ft 2 in (1.88 m)
- Position: Defender

Senior career*
Years	Team	Apps	(Gls)
–	Kirkintilloch Rob Roy		
1941–1957	Rangers	293	(22)

International career
1946–1957	Scotland	54	(0)
1947–1956	Scottish League XI	22	(2)
1955	Scotland A vs B trial	1	(0)

Managerial career
- 1959–1962: Third Lanark
- * Club domestic league appearances and goals

George Lewis Young (27 October 1922 – 10 January 1997) was a Scottish footballer who played as a defender. He is best remembered for his 16-year association with Rangers and for being the first player to receive more than 50 caps for the Scotland national team.

== Career ==
=== Club ===
Born in Grangemouth, Young started his career with junior side Kirkintilloch Rob Roy before moving to Rangers in 1941. Although primarily considered a centre back, he was often played at right back during his 16 years in Govan, to accommodate Willie Woodburn in Rangers' renowned Iron Curtain defence.

Young won the League and League Cup in 1946–47 and the Scottish Cup the following season, before Rangers became the first side to win all three trophies in the same season in 1948–49. Young himself scored twice from the penalty spot in the 4–1 Scottish Cup Final victory over Clyde which wrapped up the Treble.

Young won further League titles in 1950, 1953, 1956 and 1957, also collecting Scottish Cup winner's medals in 1950 and 1953 to take his senior medal haul to 12. The "lucky" Champagne cork he always carried earned him the nickname Corky. In total, Young had 458 appearances, scoring 31 goals for the Ibrox club (not including 180 wartime games and 32 goals) when he departed in 1957.

=== International ===
Young was selected for a string of 34 consecutive senior Scotland matches between 1948 and 1953. His total of 54 caps made him the first member of the Scotland Football Hall of Fame. Young was selected as captain on 48 of those appearances. He was also the first player to appear for Scotland as a substitute, when he replaced Billy Campbell of Morton in a Victory International against Switzerland in May 1946 (the Scottish Football Association have since classified the match as a full international, but it is not recognised by FIFA).

Young captained Scotland throughout the 1949–50 British Home Championship tournament, which FIFA had decreed to be a British qualifying group for the 1950 FIFA World Cup in Brazil. The top two teams in the Home Internationals would qualify for Brazil, but the SFA decided Scotland would only travel as British Champions. England's 1–0 win at Hampden Park relegated the Scots to second place and they did not travel. Four years later, Scotland again qualified as second-placed country in the Home Internationals, and this time the SFA decided they would travel to Switzerland for the World Cup. Rangers, however, had arranged a tour of North America at the same time and refused to release their players, including Young.

In the qualifying tournament for the 1958 FIFA World Cup in Sweden, Scotland were placed in a group with Spain and Switzerland. The group began in May 1957, by which time Young had announced he would retire from playing at the end of that season. He led Scotland to a 4–2 victory over Spain in the opening game at Hampden on 8 May, and was again captain for their 2–1 victory over Switzerland, in Basel on 19 May. However, he sustained a thigh strain in that match and did not play in a 3–1 friendly win over then world champions West Germany in Stuttgart three days later. Young was not selected for the return match with Spain in Madrid on 26 May, which Spain won 4–1, meaning his international career was over.

Young also won 22 caps for the Scottish League XI between 1947 and 1956, the second-highest all-time total for the team.

== Later life ==
After leaving Rangers, Young had a three-year spell as manager of Third Lanark between 1959 and 1962. He was then a successful hotelier, although lost money in other business ventures.

Despite his long association with Rangers, the club declined to arrange a testimonial for Young in his retirement as they were worried it would set a precedent for many other retired players. Eventually a benefit match was played in May 1986 in Falkirk between 'Young's XI' which wore the Scotland kit and contained several current internationals, and 'Don Revie's XI' which wore the England kit.

Young died at the age of 74, on 10 January 1997.

== Honours ==
Rangers

- Scottish League Championship: 1946–47, 1948–49, 1949–50, 1952–53, 1955–56, 1956–57
- Scottish Cup: 1947–48, 1948–49, 1949–50, 1952–53
- Scottish League Cup: 1946–47, 1948–49

=== Individual ===
- Scottish FA International Roll of Honour: 1956

== See also ==
- List of Scotland national football team captains
