= Eddie Rutherford =

Scottish footballer

Personal information
- Full name: Edward Rutherford
- Date of birth: 8 February 1921
- Place of birth: Govan, Scotland
- Date of death: 29 June 2007 (aged 86)
- Place of death: Rutherglen, Scotland
- Height: 5 ft 9 in (1.75 m)
- Position: Winger

Youth career
- Mossvale YMCA

Senior career*
| Years | Team | Apps | (Gls) |
| 1941–1951 | Rangers | 96 | (19) |
| 1951–1955 | Heart of Midlothian | 38 | (11) |
| 1955 | Raith Rovers | 4 | (0) |
| 1955–1956 | Hamilton Academical | 21 | (6) |

International career
| 1948 | Scotland | 1 | (0) |
| 1950 | Scottish Football League XI | 1 | (1) |
- * Club domestic league appearances and goals

Edward Rutherford (8 February 1921 – 29 August 2007) was a Scottish footballer who played for Rangers, Heart of Midlothian and Scotland as an outside forward.

== Career ==
Born in Govan, Rutherford joined Rangers from Mossvale YMCA in 1941 but during the Second World War he was posted to England and India with the Royal Air Force so guested for Leeds United, Lincoln City and Bradford City; he played three games for Bradford in 1944–45 in the Football League War Cup North section.

After he had completed his service, Rutherford returned to Rangers and made his first appearance for the club on 19 October 1946 against Queen's Park in the Scottish League Cup. However, he never became a first-team regular on the right wing and was used as back-up to William Waddell, so decided to swap position to the left flank to increase his chance of playing and spent most of his Rangers career there. Whilst at Ibrox he was part of the squad that won the first ever treble in 1949. Rutherford won two Scottish League championships, three Scottish Cups, two League Cups, two Glasgow Cups and a Charity Cup.

After ten years, 147 appearances and 31 goals, Rutherford left Rangers and joined Hearts in 1951, in a swap deal that saw Colin Liddell move to Rangers. In his four years at Tynecastle he made 50 appearances and netted 15 times in all competitions. He was sold to Raith Rovers in January 1955 but joined Hamilton five months later. After a season with Accies he retired.

Rutherford was capped once by Scotland, in 1948, a 3–0 friendly home defeat to France. After retiring from football he ran a newsagents in Rutherglen. He died on 29 June 2007, aged 86.
