= Billy Williamson (footballer, born 1922) =

Scottish footballer (1922–2006)

Personal information
- Full name: William McInnes Williamson
- Date of birth: 12 February 1922
- Place of birth: Lenzie, Scotland
- Date of death: 2006 (aged 83)
- Place of death: Kirkintilloch, Scotland
- Position: Inside forward

Senior career*
Years	Team	Apps	(Gls)
- Kirkintilloch Rob Roy
- Petershill
1941–1951	Rangers	43	(26)
1951–1953	St Mirren	6	(2)
1953–1956	Stirling Albion	53	(6)
Total		102	(34)
- * Club domestic league appearances and goals

William McInnes Williamson (12 February 1922 – 2006) was a Scottish professional footballer who played as an inside forward for Rangers, St Mirren and Stirling Albion.

== Career ==
Williamson played for local junior clubs Kirkintilloch Rob Roy and Petershill before signing for Rangers in 1941. He served with the Royal Navy as a PE instructor during the Second World War, while also playing for Rangers and as a guest for Manchester City. He became a regular in the Rangers first team in the 1945–46 season.

Williamson played and scored in the first Scottish League Cup final, in 1947. He also won two Scottish league championships and two Scottish Cups with Rangers. Williamson scored a goal in both of those Scottish Cup finals, in 1948 and 1949.

Williamson later played for St Mirren and Stirling Albion, featuring in a notable win for Stirling against Rangers. After retiring as a player, Williamson worked as a PE teacher at Lenzie Academy.
