= Bill Struth =

Scottish football manager (1875–1956)

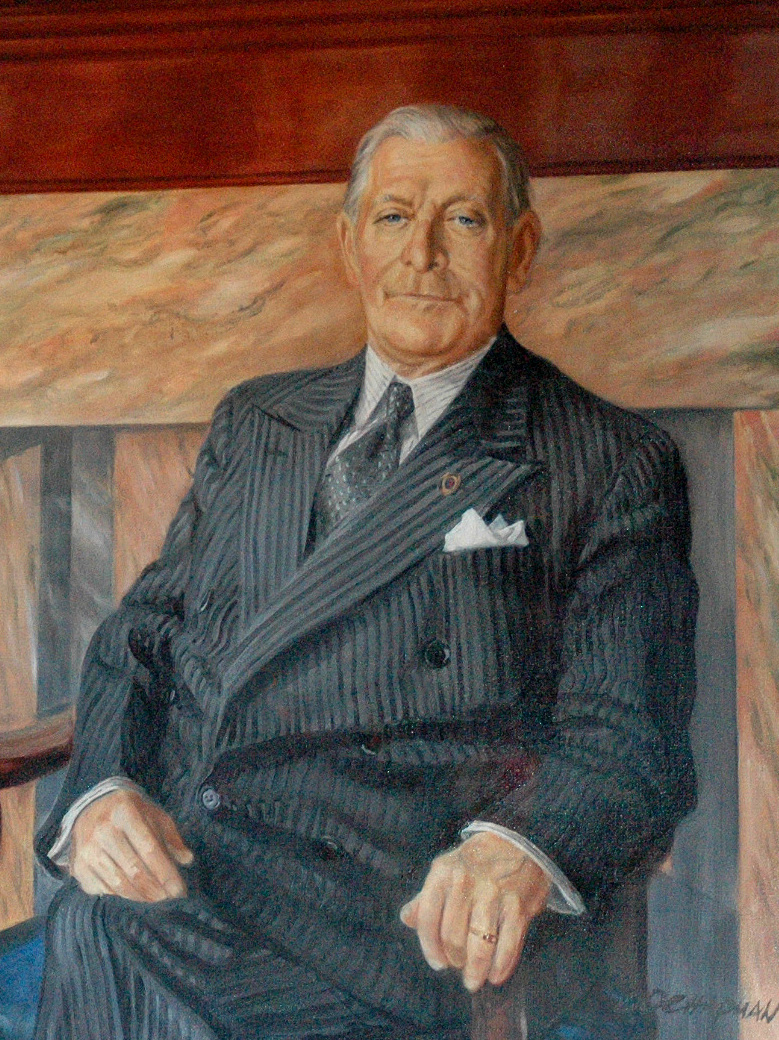
- Struth's portrait in the Ibrox Trophy Room

Personal information
- Full name: William Struth
- Date of birth: 16 June 1875
- Place of birth: Leith, Scotland
- Date of death: 21 September 1956 (aged 81)
- Place of death: Glasgow, Scotland

Managerial career
- Years: Team
- 1914–1920: Rangers (assistant)
- 1920–1954: Rangers

William Struth (16 June 1875 – 21 September 1956) was a Scottish football manager. He was the second manager of Rangers Football Club, leading the club for 34 years between 1920 and 1954, as well as being the holder of a number of other positions, including director. Struth is one of the most successful managers in Scottish and British football history, winning 30 major trophies in his career; a record 18 Scottish league championships, 10 Scottish Cups and two Scottish League Cups.

== Career ==
Struth was born in Leith, Edinburgh, the eldest child of William Struth senior, a stonemason, and Isabella Cunningham. He grew up in Edinburgh and Milnathort (his father's birthplace) in Kinross-shire and worked as a stonemason, but he also competed as a professional runner until he was in his 30s. In the early 1900s he began helping to train the players at his local football club, Heart of Midlothian, and in 1908 he moved to Glasgow to become the trainer at Clyde. For three seasons at Shawfield he worked alongside Alex Maley, brother of the Celtic manager Willie Maley.

Struth moved to Rangers in 1914 to take up the position of assistant manager. At the age of 45, in 1920, he took over as manager after his predecessor William Wilton drowned in a boating accident off Gourock.

Struth went on to win the league title 18 times as manager, winning 14 titles in 19 years before the Second World War. This included winning five titles in a row between 1927 and 1931. Struth's tenure as manager spanned the club's first league and cup double in 1928, when Rangers lifted the Scottish Cup and ended a 25-year 'hoodoo', and its first treble in 1949, Struth becoming the first Scottish manager to achieve this honour.

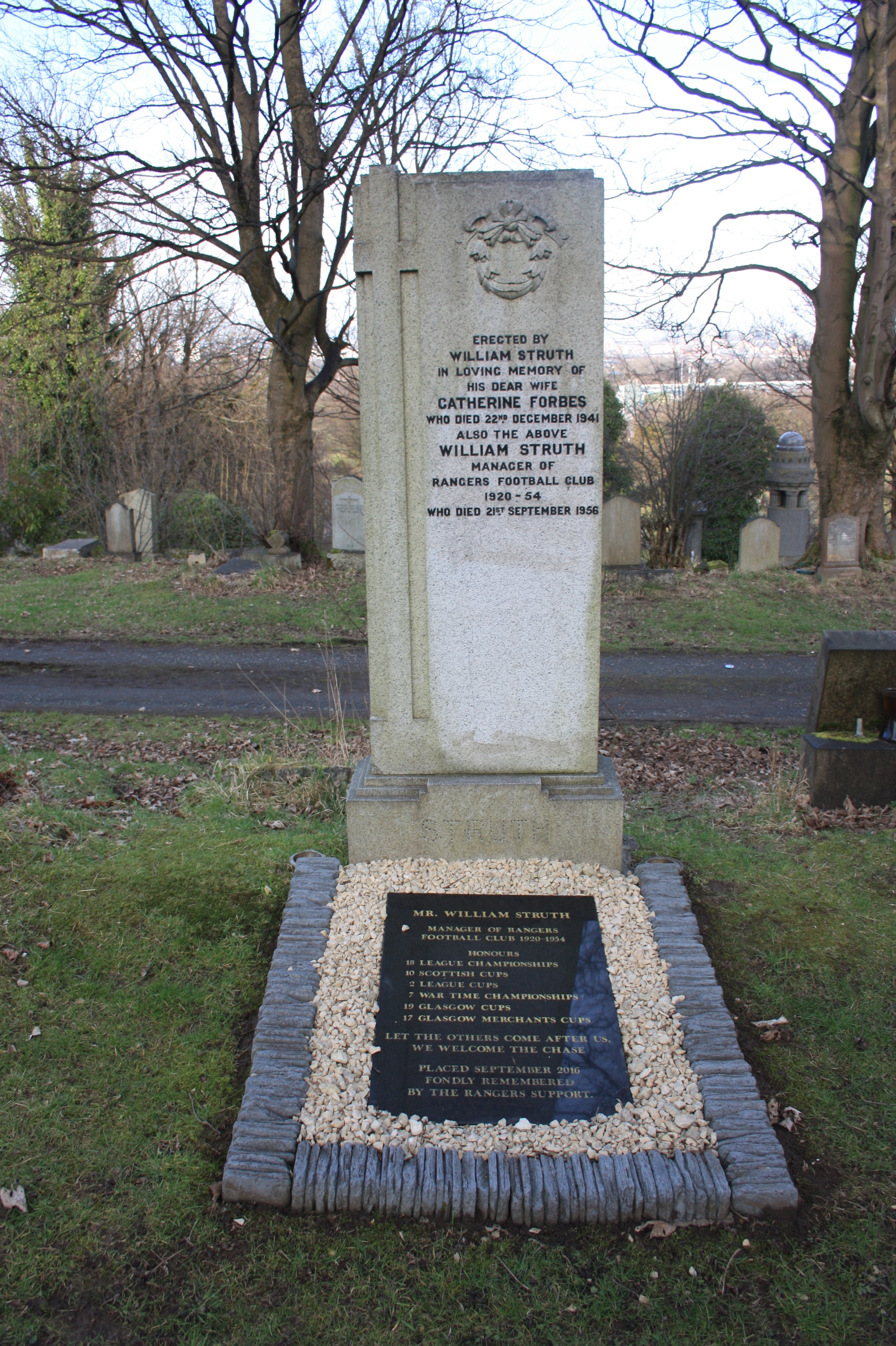
The grave of Bill Struth, Craigton Cemetery

If wartime competitions (the 1939–40 Scottish Emergency League followed by six wartime Southern League championships, the Scottish War Emergency Cup, the 1946 Victory Cup, a Summer Cup and four Southern League Cups) and local tournaments (19 Glasgow Cups, 20 Glasgow Merchants Charity Cups) are included, Struth won a total of 73 trophies during his career, making him the most decorated manager in British football history.

Struth was renowned as a disciplinarian, insisting that the team wore a collar and tie when turning up for training; bowler hats were obligatory for Rangers players. Adam Little was signed by Struth and this interview gives an insight into his methods.

In 1947, Struth became a Rangers director and was then appointed vice-chairman after retiring in 1954. In 1952 he had part of a leg amputated as a result of gangrene. He died on 21 September 1956, aged 81, at his home in Dumbreck and is buried in Craigton Cemetery, overlooking Ibrox Stadium. His wife, Catherine Forbes, predeceased him in 1941. The grave lies in the south-west section on a terrace on its north side.

== Recognition ==
In 2005, Rangers' chairman Sir David Murray unveiled a bronze bust of Bill Struth, located in the Main Stand at Ibrox, now known as the "Bill Struth Main Stand" in honour of his contribution to Rangers Football Club.

== Managerial statistics ==
Team	Nation	From	To	Record							
Team	Nation	From	To	G	W	D	L	F	A	GD	Win %
Rangers	Scotland	28th May 1920	15th June 1954	1,655	1,134	296	224	4,059	1,604	+2,427	68.52
Total				1,655	1,134	296	224	4,059	1,604	+2,427	68.52

As of 25 June 2023

== Managerial honours ==
=== Club ===
Rangers

- Scottish League (18): 1920–21, 1922–23, 1923–24, 1924–25, 1926–27, 1927–28, 1928–29, 1929–30, 1930–31, 1932–33, 1933–34, 1934–35, 1936–37, 1938–39, 1946–47, 1948–49, 1949–50, 1952–53
- Scottish Cup (10): 1927–28, 1929–30, 1931–32, 1933–34, 1934–35, 1935–36, 1947–48, 1948–49, 1949–50, 1952–53
- Scottish League Cup (2): 1946–47, 1948–49

=== Individual ===
- 6th most decorated manager of all time (30 trophies) (Note: The ranking only includes trophies of at least national level.) (Note: Since article was published Pep Guardiola has moved up to second on the list with a total of 36 trophies.)

== See also ==
- List of longest managerial reigns in association football
- List of football managers with the most matches
