= Willie Woodburn =

Scottish footballer

Personal information
- Full name: William Alexander Woodburn
- Date of birth: 8 August 1919
- Place of birth: Edinburgh, Scotland
- Date of death: 2 December 2001 (aged 82)
- Place of death: Edinburgh, Scotland
- Height: 6 ft 0 in (1.83 m)
- Position: Centre half

Senior career*
Years	Team	Apps	(Gls)
–	Edinburgh Ashton		
–	Musselburgh Athletic		
1937–1954	Rangers	216	(2)

International career
1947–1951	Scottish League XI	7	(0)
1947–1952	Scotland	24	(0)
- * Club domestic league appearances and goals

William Alexander Woodburn (8 August 1919 – 2 December 2001) was a Scottish footballer who played for Rangers and Scotland. He was the last footballer in Britain to receive a life ban from the game for indiscipline, although the ban was later rescinded and he has since been inducted into both the Scottish Football Hall of Fame and the Rangers Hall of Fame.

== Football career ==
=== Rangers ===
Born in Edinburgh, he played for junior side Edinburgh Ashton before signing as a professional for Rangers in October 1937. He made his debut on 20 August 1938 in a 2–2 draw in the League against Motherwell and made 12 appearances as the club won the league title. After World War II (during which numerous trophies made their way to Ibrox, although Woodburn was considered a reserve player for part of that time), he established himself in the Rangers side and won four more Scottish league championships and four Scottish Cups with the club as a member of its strong defensive unit known as the 'Iron Curtain'. He appeared in the first Scottish League Cup Final in April 1947, when Rangers beat Aberdeen 4–0 and won it a second time two years later.

In 1947 he received a 14-day ban for a "violent exchange" with Motherwell's Davie Mathie, then in 1953 he punched the Clyde striker Billy McPhail, which earned a 21-day ban. Later that year, Woodburn was sent off for retaliation in a match with Stirling Albion. The clubs met again the following season in a League Cup tie at Ibrox on 28 August 1954. Playing with a knee injury, Woodburn took exception to a bad foul and retaliated by headbutting a Stirling player. The Scottish Football Association convened a disciplinary hearing the following month, which lasted just four minutes, and Woodburn was suspended sine die. The England international Tom Finney, one of many well-known forwards Woodburn had encountered in his international career, described the ban as "a grave injustice". The SFA revoked their punishment three years later, but by then Woodburn was 37 and his playing career was over.

=== Scotland ===
Woodburn won 24 international caps for Scotland between 1947 and 1952. He made his debut in a 1–1 draw with England at Wembley. Woodburn also appeared seven times for the Scottish League XI.

== Post-retirement ==
After his retirement from football Woodburn ran a garage business before becoming a sportswriter with the News of the World.

== Career statistics ==
=== International appearances ===
As of 4 March 2019

International statistics
National team	Year	Apps	Goals
Scotland	1947	5	0
Scotland	1949	4	0
Scotland	1950	6	0
Scotland	1951	7	0
Scotland	1952	2	0
Total		24	0

== See also ==
- List of Scotland national football team captains
