= Rangers F.C. =

Association football club in Scotland

Rangers
- Full name: Rangers Football Club
- Nicknames: The Gers; The Light Blues; The Teddy Bears
- Founded: March 1872; 154 years ago
- Ground: Ibrox Stadium
- Capacity: 51,700
- Coordinates: 55°51′12″N 4°18′33″W
- Owner: The Rangers Football Club Ltd
- Chairman: Andrew Cavenagh
- Manager: Derek McInnes
- League: Scottish Premiership
- 2025–26: Scottish Premiership, 3rd of 12
- Website: rangers.co.uk
Home colours	Away colours	Third colours

Rangers Football Club is a professional football club in Glasgow, Scotland. The team competes in the Scottish Premiership, the top division of Scottish football. The club is often referred to as Glasgow Rangers, though this has never been its official name. The fourth-oldest football club in Scotland, Rangers was founded by four teenage boys as they walked through West End Park (now Kelvingrove Park), in March 1872, where they discussed the idea of forming a football club, and played its first match against the now-defunct Callander at the Fleshers' Haugh area of Glasgow Green in May of the same year. Rangers' home ground, Ibrox Stadium, designed by stadium architect Archibald Leitch and opened in 1929, is a Category B listed building and Scotland's third-largest football stadium. The club has always played in royal blue shirts.

Rangers have won the Scottish League title 55 times, the Scottish Cup 34 times, the Scottish League Cup a record 28 times and the domestic treble on seven occasions. Rangers won the European Cup Winners' Cup in 1972 after being losing finalists twice, in 1961 (the first British club to reach a UEFA tournament final) and 1967. The club has lost a further two European finals, the UEFA Cup final in 2008 and the UEFA Europa League final in 2022. By number of trophies won, Rangers are one of the most successful clubs in the world.

Rangers has a long-standing rivalry with Celtic, the two Glasgow clubs being collectively known as the Old Firm, considered one of the world's biggest football derbies. The rivalry is linked to sectarianism in Glasgow, with Rangers and its fanbase being associated with Protestantism and British unionism. Rangers had a policy from the First World War until the late 1980s of refusing to employ Catholic players and staff. With more than 600 Rangers supporters' clubs in 35 countries worldwide, Rangers has one of the largest fanbases in world football. The club holds the record for the largest travelling support in football history, when an estimated 200,000 Rangers fans arrived in the city of Manchester for the 2008 UEFA Cup final. An estimated 100,000 fans arrived in Seville for the 2022 UEFA Europa League final.

One of the eleven original members of the Scottish Football League, Rangers remained in the top division continuously until a financial crisis during the 2011–12 season saw the club enter administration and the original company liquidated with the assets moved to a new company structure. The club was accepted as an associate member of the Scottish Football League and placed in the fourth tier of the Scottish football league system in time for the start of the following season. Rangers then won three promotions in four years, returning to the Premiership for the start of the 2016–17 season; in their climb through the Scottish lower divisions, Rangers became the only club in Scotland to have won every domestic trophy. In 2020–21 Rangers won their first Scottish championship in ten years, a then world record fifty-fifth league win which also stopped rivals Celtic's quest to break the domestic record of nine titles in a row.

== History ==
=== Formation, early years and William Wilton ===
The 1877 Scottish Cup Final Rangers team

Rangers were formed by four founders – brothers Moses McNeil and Peter McNeil, Peter Campbell and William McBeath – who met at West End Park (now known as Kelvingrove Park) in March 1872. Rangers' first match, in May that year, was a goalless friendly draw with Callander on Glasgow Green. David Hill was also a founder member. In 1873, the club held its first annual meeting and staff were elected. By 1876, Rangers had its first international player, with Moses McNeil representing Scotland in a match against Wales. In 1877, Rangers reached the Scottish Cup final; after drawing the first game, Rangers refused to turn up for the replay and the cup was awarded to Vale of Leven. Rangers won the Glasgow Charity Cup the following year against Vale of Leven 2–1, their first major cup. The first-ever match against Celtic took place in 1888, the year after the East End club's establishment. Rangers lost 5–2 in a friendly to an opposition composed largely of guest players from Hibernian.

Chart of Rangers yearly table positions in League play

The 1890–91 season saw the inception of the Scottish Football League, and Rangers, by then playing at the first Ibrox Stadium, were one of ten original members. The club's first-ever league match, on 16 August 1890, resulted in a 5–2 victory over Heart of Midlothian. After finishing joint-top with Dumbarton, a play-off held at Cathkin Park finished 2–2 and the title was shared for the only time in its history. Rangers' first-ever Scottish Cup win came in 1894 after a 3–1 final victory over rivals Celtic. By the start of the 20th century, Rangers had won two league titles and three Scottish Cups. During William Wilton's time as match secretary and then team manager, Rangers won ten league titles.

=== Bill Struth and Scot Symon ===
Taking over as manager after William Wilton's death in 1920, Bill Struth was Rangers' most successful manager, guiding the club to 14 league titles before the onset of the Second World War. On 2 January 1939, a British league attendance record was broken as 118,567 fans turned out to watch Rangers beat Celtic in the traditional New Year's Day Old Firm match. Leading the club for 34 years until 1954, Struth won more trophies than any manager in Scottish Football history, amassing 18 league championships, 10 Scottish Cups, two League Cups, seven war-time championships, 19 Glasgow Cups, 17 Glasgow Merchant Charity Cups and other war-time honours. During the wartime regional league setup (in which the team won all seven seasons, along with official championships either side of the conflict in 1938–39 and 1946–47), Rangers achieved their highest score against Celtic with an 8–1 win in the Southern Football League.

Scot Symon continued Struth's success, winning six league championships, five Scottish Cups and four League Cups, becoming the second manager to win the domestic treble in 1963–64 season, the era of 'Slim' Jim Baxter, one of the club's greatest players. Rangers also lost by their biggest Old Firm margin of 7–1.

Rangers reached the semi-finals of the European Cup in 1960, losing to German club Eintracht Frankfurt by a record aggregate 12–4 for a Scottish team. In 1961 Rangers became the first British team to reach a European final when they contested the Cup Winners' Cup final against Italian side Fiorentina, only to lose 4–1 on aggregate. Rangers lost again in the final of the same competition in 1967, by a single goal, after extra time, to Bayern Munich.

=== Ibrox disaster, European success and Jock Wallace ===
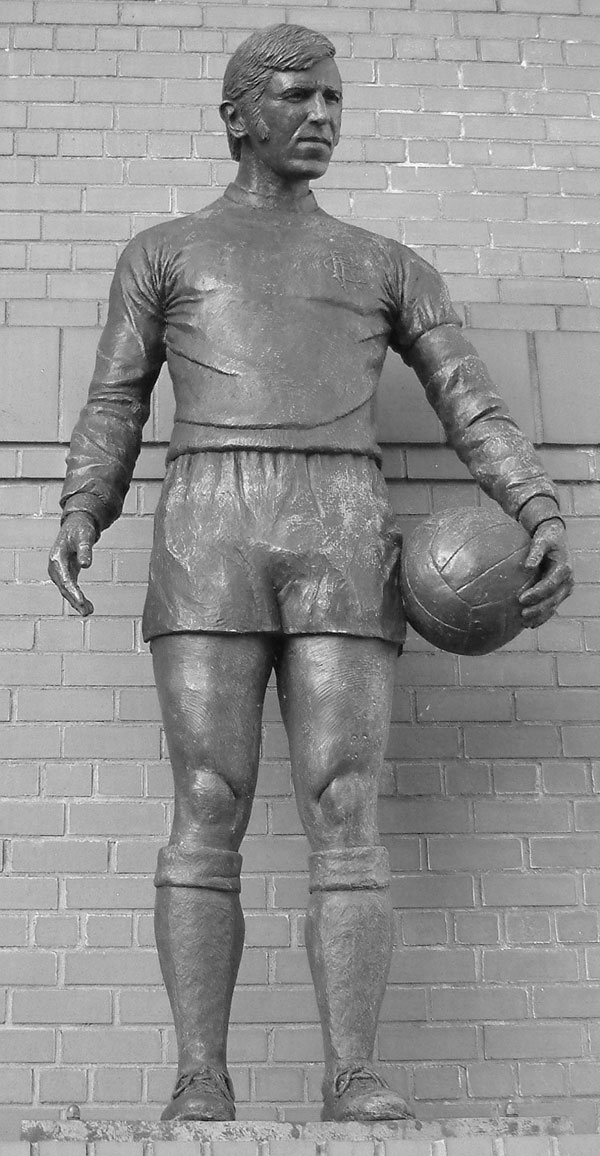
The Ibrox Disaster memorial statue, commemorating the 1971 tragedy along with previous disasters

The Ibrox disaster occurred on 2 January 1971 when large-scale crushing on a stairway exit at the culmination of an Old Firm game claimed 66 lives. An enquiry concluded that the crush was likely to have happened ten minutes after the final whistle and to have been triggered by someone falling on the stairs. A benefit match to raise funds for the victims' families took place after the disaster, a joint Rangers and Celtic team playing a Scotland XI at Hampden, watched by 81,405 fans.

In 1972, Rangers emerged from the tragedy of the previous year to finally achieve success on the European stage. A Colin Stein goal and a Willie Johnston double helped secure a 3–2 victory over Dynamo Moscow at the Nou Camp, Barcelona, to lift the European Cup Winners' Cup. Captain John Greig received the trophy in a small room within the Nou Camp following pitch invasions by Rangers fans reacting to the heavy handed tactics of the Spanish police, the majority of whom had been brought in from outwith Catalonia. Rangers were banned from Europe for two years for the behaviour of their fans, later reduced on appeal to one year.

The following season saw the club compete in the first ever European Super Cup, although the European ban saw it officially recognised as Rangers centenary anniversary match. The side played the European Cup holders Ajax, who had first proposed the idea, in January 1973. The Dutch side proved too strong and recorded a 6–3 aggregate win, with Rangers losing 1–3 at Ibrox and 3–2 in Amsterdam.

Emerging from the shadows of Jock Stein's Celtic side, Rangers regained ascendancy with notable domestic success under the stewardship of manager Jock Wallace. In his first season in charge – the club's centenary – Rangers won the Scottish Cup at Hampden in front of 122,714 supporters. In 1974–75, Wallace led Rangers to their first League championship triumph in 11 years, before winning the treble the following season, repeating the historic feat in 1977–78.

John Greig served as manager for five years but was unable to achieve the success as a manager that he had as a player. Unable to win the league during his reign, he was replaced by Wallace returning in 1983. Wallace was unable to repeat the success of his first period in charge with a win ratio of less than 50%, and was himself replaced by Graeme Souness in 1986.

=== Graeme Souness, Walter Smith and 9-in-a-row ===
Every year from the 1988–89 season until the 1996–97 season, Rangers won the league title. This nine-in-a-row achievement equalled Celtic's record, set prior to the forming of the Scottish Football League Premier Division, subsequent to which competing teams met four times a season. The first three of these seasons the club was managed by Graeme Souness; the latter six under the stewardship of Walter Smith.

Notable seasons included 1990–91, which culminated in a last-day finale, Rangers securing a 2–0 victory at Ibrox over Aberdeen, who needed only a draw to secure the championship. Season 1992–93 was notable for a domestic treble of trophies, as well an extended run in the inaugural UEFA Champions League, the club at one stage only one goal from securing a place in the final.

Rangers' ninth consecutive championship title was secured at Tannadice Park on 7 May 1997, with a single-goal victory over Dundee United.

=== Dick Advocaat, Alex McLeish and Paul Le Guen ===
In 1998, Dutchman Dick Advocaat became the club's first foreign manager. Nine-in-a-row era stalwarts having moved on, Advocaat invested heavily in the team with immediate results, leading the club to their sixth domestic treble. The league championship was won with a 3–0 victory at Celtic Park on 2 May 1999. A second-consecutive league title was won by a record 21-point margin, the club securing a domestic double with a 4–0 Scottish Cup final victory over Aberdeen. Rangers' campaign in the Champions League saw them defeat UEFA Cup winners Parma en route.

Advocaat's third season saw Rangers fail to compete domestically against Celtic under new manager Martin O'Neill. Despite investment in the team, including Tore Andre Flo for a club-record £12 million, European success beyond the Champions League group stages again proved elusive. After a slow start to the following season, Advocaat resigned from his post in December 2001 and was replaced by Alex McLeish.

In his first full campaign, the 2002–03 season saw McLeish become the sixth Rangers manager to deliver a domestic treble. The championship was won on goal difference during a dramatic final day 6–1 triumph over Dunfermline Athletic at Ibrox, securing Rangers' 50th league title, the first club in the world to achieve the feat. Major expenditure sanctioned by chairman David Murray had burdened Rangers with considerable debts in the region of £52m. The club's worsening financial state saw many of the team's top players leave in the summer of 2003, the following season failing to deliver any trophies, only the second such occasion since 1985–86.

The 2004–05 season restored success to Rangers, who were boosted by signings such as Jean-Alain Boumsong, Dado Pršo and Nacho Novo, along with the return of former captain Barry Ferguson after a spell in England with Blackburn Rovers. The club's league championship triumph culminated in a dramatic final-day finish. The destination of the trophy changed unexpectedly, with Celtic conceding late goals to Motherwell at Fir Park whilst Rangers led against Hibernian, requiring the helicopter carrying the SPL trophy to change direction and deliver the prize to the Easter Road ground in Leith.

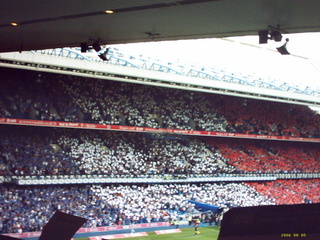
Card display at Ibrox to welcome Paul Le Guen

Despite beginning as favourites to retain the championship, Rangers suffered an unprecedented run of poor results between September and November, a club-record run of ten games without a win. Included within this period, a 1–1 draw with Inter Milan took Rangers into the last 16 of the Champions League, the first Scottish team to achieve the feat since 1993, the club eventually exiting on the away goals rule to Villarreal. On 9 February 2006, it was announced by David Murray that McLeish would be standing down as manager at the end of that season.

Frenchman Paul Le Guen replaced Alex McLeish as manager after season 2005–06. The season started with an early exit from the League Cup whilst Celtic built a commanding lead at the top of the table. In the UEFA Cup, Rangers became the first Scottish side to qualify for the last 32 of the competition, since the introduction of the group phase, after finishing their group unbeaten. However, amid claims of disharmony between the manager and captain Barry Ferguson, it was announced on 4 January 2007 that Le Guen had left Rangers by mutual consent.

=== Walter Smith's return and Ally McCoist ===
On 10 January 2007, former boss Walter Smith resigned from his post as Scotland manager to return to the Ibrox helm, with Ally McCoist as assistant manager.

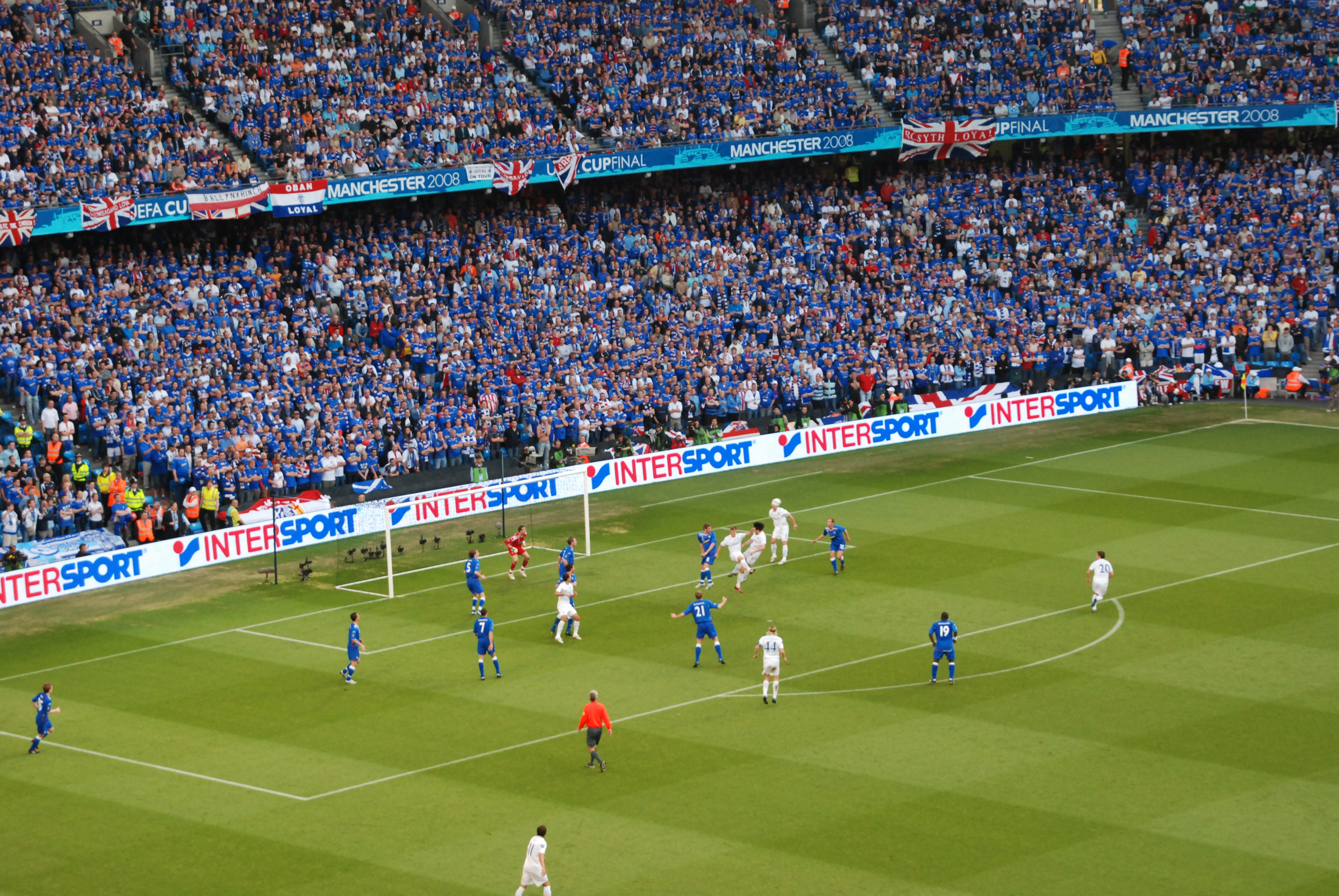
The 2008 UEFA Cup final in Manchester, which Rangers contested

The following season Rangers contested the UEFA Cup after dropping into the competition from the Champions League. The club reached the final, defeating Panathinaikos, Werder Bremen, Sporting Lisbon and Fiorentina along the way. The final in Manchester against Zenit Saint Petersburg, who were managed by former Rangers manager Dick Advocaat, ended in a 2–0 defeat. An estimated 200,000 supporters travelled to Manchester for the event, and the 2008 UEFA Cup final riots occurred.

The 2008–09 season saw Rangers recover from an early exit from the UEFA Champions League to FBK Kaunas of Lithuania. The club secured its 52nd league championship on the last day of the season with a 3–0 victory at Dundee United. Rangers also successfully defended the Scottish Cup, defeating Falkirk 1–0 in the final.

The 2009–10 season saw Rangers reach their fifth consecutive domestic final: against St Mirren in the Scottish League Cup, the club overcame a two-men deficit from red cards, a late deciding goal from Kenny Miller securing the victory. The league championship title was retained, with three matches remaining, at Easter Road, defeating Hibernian 1–0 with a Kyle Lafferty goal. The 2010–11 season, Smith's final season in charge, saw Rangers retain the League Cup, defeating Celtic at Hampden with a Nikica Jelavić goal in extra time. A third consecutive title was won by beating Kilmarnock 5–1 on the last day of the season, Smith's final match in charge of the club.

Ally McCoist took over from Walter Smith in June 2011 but season 2011–12 started with Rangers eliminated from two European competitions before the end of August: losing to Swedish side Malmö in the Champions League third round qualifying match, and to Slovenian side Maribor in a Europa League qualifying match. While good league form saw Rangers in top spot after being unbeaten for the first 15 games, they were knocked out of the League Cup by Falkirk and the Scottish Cup by Dundee United at Ibrox. Rangers were placed into administration on 14 February 2012 resulting in the club being deducted 10 points as per SPL rules. Though Rangers avoided having Celtic win the championship at Ibrox on 25 March by winning the game 3–2, Rangers ultimately finished 20 points behind Celtic in second place.

=== Insolvency and the lower leagues ===
On 1 June 2012, after four months in administration, a failure to reach a CVA agreement with creditors led to The Rangers Football Club plc (since renamed RFC 2012 plc) entering the process of liquidation. The administrators completed a sale of the business and assets to a new company, Sevco Scotland Ltd (which later renamed itself The Rangers Football Club Ltd), though most first-team players refused to transfer across. The new company failed to secure the transfer of Rangers' previous place in the Scottish Premier League, but were later accepted into the Scottish Football League. Rangers were awarded associate membership and placed in the lowest division, the Third, rather than the First Division as the SPL and SFA had sought. The transfer of Rangers' SFA membership was agreed by the SFA upon acceptance of a number of conditions, including a one-year transfer ban, in time for the club to begin the 2012–13 season.

With most key Rangers players having refused to transfer to the new company, a very different Rangers team lined up for the first league match in the Third Division though it secured a comfortable 5–1 victory over East Stirlingshire in front of a crowd of 49,118, a world record for a football match in a fourth tier league. (Note: However this attendance was unofficially exceeded prior to this match in Brazil. But this attendance was not officially recorded.) Away from home, Rangers started their league campaign with three successive draws before losing 1–0 to Stirling Albion, at the time the bottom club in the country. Rangers were defeated in the third round of the Scottish Challenge Cup by Queen of the South at Ibrox, in the quarter-finals of the Scottish League Cup at home to Inverness Caledonian Thistle and in the fifth round of the Scottish Cup by Dundee United. Rangers beat their own new record against Queens Park with an attendance of 49,463 and again against Stirling Albion with an attendance of 49,913. Rangers clinched the Third Division title on 30 March after a goalless draw at Montrose.

Apart from being defeated 2–1 by Forfar Athletic in the first round of the League Cup on 3 August, the 2013–14 season got off to an excellent start with Rangers winning maximum league points in their first 15 games in League One, before being held to a draw at home by Stranraer on Boxing Day 2013. Rangers secured the League One title and promotion to Scottish football's second tier on 12 March 2014 and went on to end the season unbeaten in league football. Rangers also reached the final of the Scottish Challenge Cup, in which they lost to Raith Rovers and the semi-final of the Scottish Cup, in which they lost 3–1 at Ibrox to Dundee United.

Playing in the Scottish Championship in season 2014–15 provided Rangers with a more difficult challenge, with the club losing home and away to both Hibernian and Hearts and also losing away to Queen of the South in the first half of the season. Rangers also failed to beat Alloa either home or away in the league before losing 3–2 to Alloa in the semi-final of the Scottish Challenge Cup. Amid mounting criticism, McCoist submitted his resignation intending to honour his 12 months notice period but was placed on gardening leave and replaced by Kenny McDowall on a caretaker basis. McDowall remained in charge for just three months before resigning in March 2015. During his time in charge, Rangers won just three matches. Rangers then named former player Stuart McCall as their third manager of the season for the remaining fixtures. Under McCall, Rangers finished third in the league and then reached the Premiership play-off final, which they lost 6–1 on aggregate to Motherwell.

=== Warburton, Premiership return, Caixinha and Murty ===
In June 2015, it was announced that Mark Warburton had been appointed as manager on a three-year deal. Rangers went on to win the 2015–16 Scottish Championship and automatic promotion to the Scottish Premiership, ending their four-year stint in the lower divisions. The club also reached the 2016 Scottish Cup final, beating Old Firm rivals Celtic in the semi-final at Hampden, before losing to Hibernian in the final. After a poor first half of the 2016–17 season, Mark Warburton and David Weir left Rangers on 10 February 2017, and Graeme Murty was placed in caretaker control of the Rangers first team. Pedro Caixinha eventually took over as permanent manager.

Caixinha's first full season started with Rangers suffering one of the worst results in their history. After winning 1–0 at Ibrox, Rangers lost 2–0 to Luxembourg minnows Progrès Niederkorn, resulting in Rangers being knocked out 2–1 on aggregate in the first qualifying round of the 2017–18 Europa League. Progrès had never before won a tie and had only ever scored once before in European competition. After that disappointing start to the season the form did not improve, with notable results including a 2–0 reverse to Celtic at home in the league and defeat to Motherwell in the Scottish League Cup semi-final by the same scoreline. On 26 October, a day after a 95th-minute equaliser at Ibrox by last-placed Kilmarnock saw Rangers draw 1–1, Caixinha was sacked and Graeme Murty took over as caretaker manager again. The Portuguese manager's reign was described as "a desperate mess from start to finish".

In late December, after a search for a more experienced manager proved unsuccessful, including a failed attempt to appoint Aberdeen manager Derek McInnes, Murty (who had won back-to-back games over Aberdeen and also defeated Hibernian away from home during his interim spell) was appointed to the role until the end of the season. On 1 May 2018, Murty's second spell in charge ended prematurely when he was sacked as manager following a 5–0 defeat to Celtic which resulted in Celtic winning their 7th consecutive league title. Rangers again ended the season in 3rd place, behind Celtic and Aberdeen for the second year in a row.

=== The Gerrard era ===
On 4 May 2018, former Liverpool and England captain Steven Gerrard was confirmed as the new manager of Rangers on a four-year contract. Gerrard's era started successfully with Rangers remaining unbeaten in their first 12 games, clinching a place in the UEFA Europa League group stage in the process. However Rangers were then defeated by Celtic in the first Old Firm match of the season, and the following month were eliminated from the League Cup by Aberdeen. On 29 December, Rangers defeated Celtic at Ibrox to inflict Brendan Rodgers' first defeat in 13 Old Firm games; Rangers first win over Celtic since a Scottish Cup victory in April 2016 and their first league win over Celtic since March 2012. Aberdeen knocked Rangers out of a cup for the second time in the season after securing a 2–0 victory in the Scottish Cup at Ibrox on 12 March 2019.

The 2019–20 season began with Rangers again qualifying for the UEFA Europa League group stage before losing 2–0 to Celtic at Ibrox in the first Old Firm match of the season on 1 September. The following day, the club signed Ryan Kent from Liverpool for £7 million. Rangers reached the final of the League Cup, but despite a dominant performance, were beaten 1–0 by Celtic. On 12 December, Rangers progressed to the UEFA Europa League Round of 32 as group runners-up after a 1–1 draw with Young Boys which secured European football beyond Christmas for the first time since the 2010–11 season. On 29 December, Rangers beat Celtic 2–1 at Celtic Park, their first win at their arch rival's stadium since October 2010. However a slump in form thereafter, including losing to Hearts in the Scottish Cup and Hamilton in the league within five days, left Rangers 13 points adrift of Celtic a week into March. However, all professional football in Scotland was suspended later that month due to the COVID-19 pandemic in the United Kingdom. On 18 May 2020, the SPFL officially ended the season, and Celtic were awarded the league title which was determined by points per game.

On 7 March 2021, Rangers won the league title for the first time in ten years, going on to end the league campaign undefeated, with a club record 102 points.

=== Giovanni van Bronckhorst, Europa League Final, Michael Beale return and Philippe Clement ===
Midway through the 2021–22 season, Steven Gerrard left Rangers for Aston Villa, and was replaced by former Rangers midfielder Giovanni van Bronckhorst on 11 November 2021. He led Rangers to their first European final in fourteen years, beating Borussia Dortmund, Red Star Belgrade, Braga and RB Leipzig on the way to facing Eintracht Frankfurt in the 2022 UEFA Europa League final. He also took the club to their first Scottish Cup final in six years, in which they beat Hearts.

In the 2022–23 season, Rangers qualified for the UEFA Champions League group stage for the first time since the 2010–11 season. They went on to lose all six group matches against Napoli, Liverpool and Ajax with only two goals scored and a −20 goal difference overall, setting the worst performance in a Champions League group stage, surpassing Dinamo Zagreb's −19 goal difference in the 2011–12 season. Giovanni van Bronckhorst was sacked on 21 November 2022, after also falling nine points behind Celtic in the Scottish Premiership. Michael Beale, a coach under previous manager Steven Gerrard, succeeded van Bronckhorst on 28 November 2022. After a winning start, Beale had turned around results quickly. However, they lost out in both cup competitions against Celtic and finished the 2022–23 season seven points behind their rivals. After a summer rebuild, Rangers lost on the opening day of the 2023–24 season to Kilmarnock; their hopes of qualifying for that seasons Champions League was also crushed after losing to PSV Eindhoven. Beale was sacked as manager on 1 October 2023, the defeat to Aberdeen at Ibrox the culmination of a very poor run of results.

Philippe Clement was appointed manager on 15 October 2023, Rangers' sixth permanent manager in ten years, with Steven Davis being the interim manager prior to Clement's appointment. The club won their 28th League Cup title, and their first in twelve years. Rangers finished runners up to Celtic in the league and the Scottish Cup. After being defeated by Dynamo Kyiv in the 2024–25 Champions League Third Qualifying Round, Rangers entered the Europa League, where they placed eighth in the new format, placing them directly in the Round of 16. Clement was sacked as manager on 23 February 2025.

=== 2025 takeover, Russell Martin and Danny Röhl ===
On 30 May 2025, Rangers announced that a consortium headed by US businessman Andrew Cavenagh and 49ers Enterprises, the investment arm of the San Francisco 49ers, had purchased 51% of shares to compete a multi-million pound takeover of the club. Russell Martin was appointed head coach in June 2025 on a three-year deal. Following a string of poor results, including one league win in seven games, Martin was sacked after a 1–1 draw against Falkirk just 123 days after becoming head coach, making him the shortest serving manager in Rangers' history.

Danny Röhl was appointed Martin's successor on 20 October 2025. Under Röhl, Rangers finished the 2025–26 Scottish Premiership in third place, before the German departed the club for Red Bull Salzburg on 17 June 2026.

=== Derek McInnes ===
On 17 June 2026, former Rangers midfielder Derek McInnes was announced as manager, the third to be appointed under the American consortium. He signed a three-year contract.

== Crest and colours ==
=== Crest ===
Unusually for a football club, Rangers have two different official crests. Today the original scroll crest appears on the club's strips whereas the lion rampant club crest is used by the media, on club merchandise and on official club documents. Both crests have undergone minor variations since their introduction. It is believed that the scroll crest, representing the letters RFC overlapping, has been used since the club's formation in 1872, although the oldest remaining piece of memorabilia containing this crest is from the 1881–82 season. The scroll crest was replaced in 1959 with the lion rampant club crest which featured a lion rampant, an old-style football and the club's motto Ready, which was shortened from Aye Ready (meaning Always Ready in Scots), all surrounded by the team name, Rangers Football Club. The lion rampant club crest was modernised in 1968; the lion rampant, team name, club motto and old style football all remained. It was again updated slightly in the early 1990s and then once more in 2020 to the current version. The modern circular crest is regularly used on club merchandise and by the media; it has never featured prominently on the club strip. In 1968 the scroll crest made a return appearing on the chest of the club shirt for the first time while the modernised club crest was still the club's official logo. The scroll crest first appeared on the teams shorts for the start of the 1978–79 season. In 2021 the club unveiled a 150th anniversary crest that was to be used during the 2021–22 season.

The current lion rampant club crest. Never appeared on the shirt.

The way the scroll crest has appeared on the club shirt has varied slightly through the years. Between 1990 and 1994, 'Rangers Football Club' and the 'Ready' motto appeared above and below the Crest respectively. Between 1997 and 1999, the scroll crest featured within a shield. After a successful end to the season in 2003, which delivered Rangers a Domestic Treble and their 50th league title; five stars were added to the top of the scroll crest, one for every ten titles won by the club. The team wore a special crest on 8 December 2012 in a home league match against Stirling Albion, to commemorate the 140th anniversary of their formation. '1872–2012' appeared above the scroll crest with the words '140 years' featuring below.

Kit crest history

Scroll crest, appeared on the chest of the Rangers shirt since 1968

Scroll crest version with banner and 'Ready' motto, worn on shirts between 1990 and 1995

Scroll crest with five stars, worn on shirts between 2003 and 2021

=== Colours ===
The club colours of Rangers are royal blue, white and red. However, for the majority of the first forty-eight years of Rangers existence the club played in a plain lighter blue home shirt. The only deviation from this was a four-season period from 1879 when the side wore the lighter shade of blue and white in a hooped style. Traditionally this is accompanied by white shorts (often with royal blue or red trim) and black socks with red turn-downs. Rangers moved from the lighter shade of blue to royal blue in 1921, and have had a royal blue home shirt every year since. Black socks were first included in 1883 for five seasons before disappearing for eight years but became a more permanent fixture from 1896 onwards. When the red turn-downs were added to the socks in 1904, the strip began to look more like the modern day Rangers home kit. Occasionally, the home kit will be altered by the shorts and socks, sometimes replacing the black socks with white ones; or replacing the white shorts and black socks combination with royal blue shorts and socks.

The basic design of Rangers away strips has changed far more than the traditional home strip. Rangers original change strip, used between 1876 and 1879, was all white featuring blue and white hooped socks and a light blue six pointed star on the chest. White and red have been the most common colours for Rangers alternate strips, though dark and light blue have also featured highly. In 1994 Rangers introduced a third kit. This is usually worn if both the home and away kits clash with their opponents. The colours used in the third kits have included combinations of white, red, dark and light blue as well as black. Orange and blue change strips, first seen in 1993–94, worn once in 2002–03 and reintroduced in 2018–19 and 2022–23, have caused controversy because the colours were seen as referencing the Orange Order.

Selection of Rangers kits through history
The blue shirt, white shorts and blue & white hooped socks. Worn 1873–1879.	A change kit featuring a white top. Worn 1916–1918, 1921–1932 and 1933–1934.	The blue shirt, white shorts and black socks. Worn 1883–1888 and 1896–1904.	The royal blue shirt with white collar and black socks with red tops. Worn 1921–1957.	The royal blue shirt and red socks with white tops. Worn 1968–1973 and 2012–2013.	The royal blue shirt and black socks with red tops. Worn 1958–1968 and 1973–1978.

=== Kit suppliers and shirt sponsors ===
Since 1978, when Rangers signed a deal with Umbro, they have had a specific kit manufacturer and since 1984 have had a kit sponsor. The following tables detail Rangers' shirt sponsors and kit suppliers by year:

Kit suppliers
Period	Supplier
1978–1990	Umbro
1990–1992	Admiral
1992–1997	Adidas
1997–2002	Nike
2002–2005	Diadora
2005–2013	Umbro
2013–2018	Puma
2018–2020	Hummel
2020–2025	Castore
2025–present	Umbro

Front of shirt sponsors
Period	Sponsor
1984–1987	CR Smith
1987–1999	McEwan's Lager
1999–2003	NTL
2003–2010	Carling
2010–2013	Tennent's
2013–2014	Blackthorn
2014–2023	32Red
2023–present	Unibet

Back of shirt sponsors
Period	Sponsor	Position
2017–2020	Utilita	Top
2020–2021	The Energy Check	Bottom
2020–present	SEKO Logistics	Top
2021–2022	Sportemon Go	Bottom
2022–2023	Socomec	Bottom
2024–2025	MyGuava	Bottom
2026–	Pipeline Energy Solutions	Bottom

Sleeve sponsors
Period	Sponsor
2020–2022	Tomket Tires
2022–present	BOXT

Shorts sponsors
Period	Sponsor
2021–2022	Bitci
2023–2025	AIM Building & Maintenance Services

When Rangers played French sides in 1996–97 and 1997–98, they wore the logo of Center Parcs instead of McEwan's Lager, due to a French ban on alcohol advertising. Later matches in France (when the club was sponsored by Carling) saw the club play with no shirt sponsor, in 2006 and 2007.

During 32Red's sponsorship, Rangers faced NK Osijek in 2018–19 wearing unsponsored training gear due to Croatia's ban on gambling advertising. Team Talk, an arm of the Rangers Charity Foundation, appeared on the shirts on two occasions in 2021–22: away in Leipzig, as Unibet hold no licence for Germany; and in the 2021–22 UEFA Europa League final against Eintracht Frankfurt, as gambling advertisements are banned in Spain.

=== Mascot ===
Broxi Bear is the official mascot of Rangers. Its name is derived from Rangers' home stadium, Broxi being an anagram of Ibrox. Broxi is a brown bear with blue inner ears and nose, wearing a Rangers strip. He made his first appearance in a 2–2 draw against Raith Rovers on 13 November 1993. Broxi was later accompanied by his "wife" Roxi and their "son" Boris although from 2001 Roxi and Boris no longer made any on-field appearances at Ibrox. Roxi and Boris did continue to appear on some club merchandise. On 9 September 2017, Roxi and Boris were re-introduced before a 4–1 win against Dundee.

== Stadium and training facility ==
The club used a variety of grounds in Glasgow as a venue for home matches in the years between 1872 and 1899. The first was Fleshers' Haugh, situated on Glasgow Green, followed by Burnbank Park in the Kelvinbridge area of the city, and then Kinning Park for ten years from the mid-1870s to the mid-1880s. From February of the 1886–87 season, Cathkin Park was used until the first Ibrox Park, in the Ibrox area of south-west Glasgow, was inaugurated for the following season. Ibrox Stadium in its current incarnation was originally designed by the architect Archibald Leitch, a Rangers fan who also played a part in the design of, among others, Old Trafford in Manchester and Highbury in London. The stadium was inaugurated on 30 December 1899, and Rangers defeated Hearts 3–1 in the first match held there.

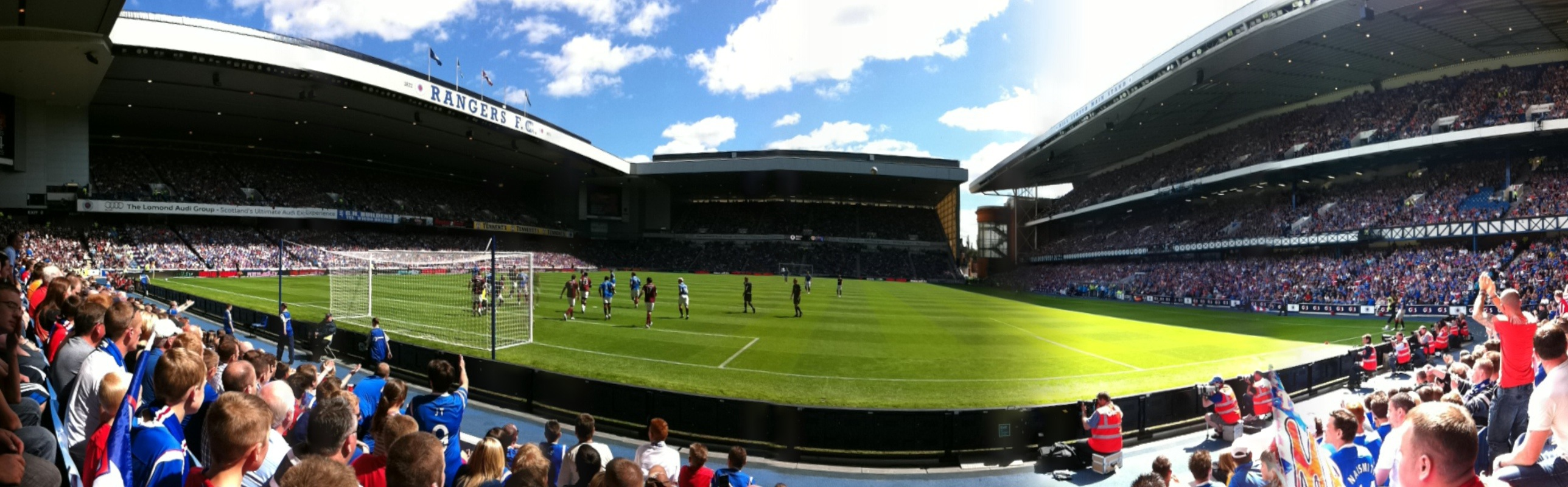
A panorama of Ibrox Stadium from the Broomloan Road End. This picture was taken during the first match of the 2011–12 SPL season, Rangers vs Heart of Midlothian.

Rangers' training facility is located in the Auchenhowie area of Milngavie, Glasgow; it was initially named Murray Park after former chairman and owner Sir David Murray, but has since been renamed. It was proposed by then-manager Dick Advocaat upon his arrival at the club in 1998. It was completed in 2001 at a cost of £14 million. The training centre was the first purpose-built facility of its kind in Scotland, and incorporates features including nine football pitches, a gym, a hydrotherapy pool and a video-editing suite. Rangers' youth teams are also accommodated at the centre, with around 140 players between under-10 and under-19 age groups using the facilities. International club teams playing in Scotland, as well as national sides, have previously used the centre for training, and Advocaat's South Korea team used it for training prior to the 2006 World Cup.

== Club identity, supporters and relations with other clubs ==
Rangers are one of the best supported clubs in Europe, the figure for the 2017–18 season being in the 20 largest home league attendances in Europe. A study of stadium attendance figures from 2013 to 2018 by the CIES Football Observatory ranked Rangers at 18th in the world during that period, with Rangers' accounting for 27.4% of total Scottish attendance, placing them eighth overall for national attendance share.

The Rangers Worldwide Alliance is a network of supporters clubs that was set up for the benefit of the club and the fans. There are more than 600 registered supporters clubs with over 30,000 registered members. There are also many unregistered supporters clubs currently active. The official club website lists over 100 supporters' clubs in Great Britain and Northern Ireland, with over 100 further clubs spread across over 35 countries around the world.

Rangers fans have contributed to several records for high attendances, including the highest home attendance for a league fixture, 118,567 on 2 January 1939. Rangers record highest attendance was against Hibernian on 27 March 1948 in the Scottish Cup semi-final at Hampden Park. Rangers beat Hibernian 1–0 in front of a packed 143,570 crowd.

In 2008, up to 200,000 Rangers supporters, many without match tickets, travelled to Manchester for the UEFA Cup Final. Despite most supporters behaving "impeccably", Rangers fans were involved in serious trouble and rioting. A minority of fans rioted in the city centre, clashing violently with police and damaging property, resulting in 42 being arrested for a variety of offences.

In 2022, Rangers also took the largest-ever travelling support abroad when an estimated 100,000 fans arrived in Seville for the UEFA Europa League Final. No arrests were made in Seville as Rangers supporters impressed the Spanish police with their good behaviour.

Supporters group Club 1872 are shareholders in the club.

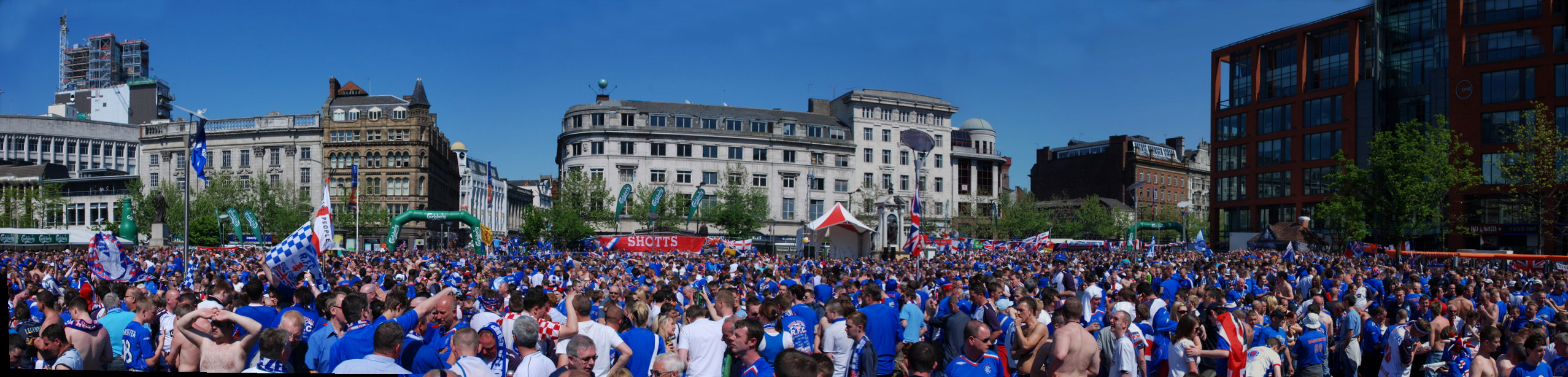
A panorama of Rangers supporters at the 2008 UEFA Cup final, in the Piccadilly Gardens fan zone. This picture was taken during the day, before the match against Zenit Saint Petersburg on 14 May 2008.

=== Rivalries ===
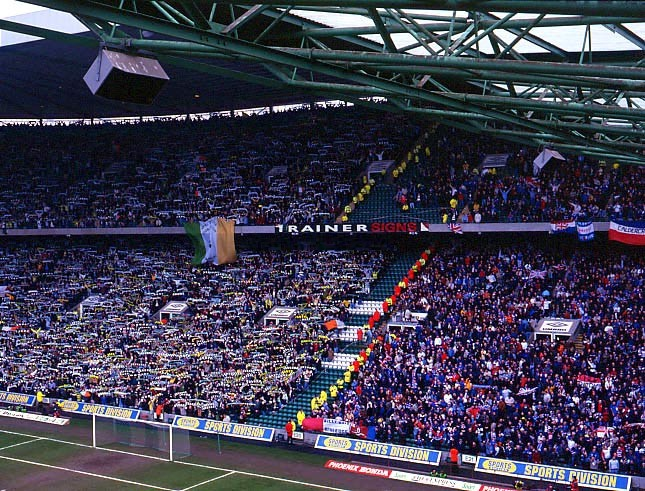
Rangers fans (right) at an Old Firm match away to Celtic in 2004

The club's most distinct rivalry is with Glasgow neighbours Celtic; the two clubs are collectively known as the Old Firm. Rangers' traditional support is largely drawn from the Protestant Unionist community, whilst Celtic's traditional support is largely drawn from the Catholic community. The first Old Firm match was won by Celtic and there have been over four hundred matches played to date. The Old Firm rivalry has fuelled many assaults, sometimes leading to deaths, on Old Firm derby days; an activist group that monitors sectarian activity in Glasgow has reported that on Old Firm weekends, admissions to hospital emergency rooms have increased over normal levels and journalist Franklin Foer noted that in the period from 1996 to 2003, eight deaths in Glasgow were directly linked to Old Firm matches, as well as hundreds of assaults.

The bitter rivalry with Aberdeen developed following an incident in the 1979 League Cup final when Rangers' Derek Johnstone provoked the fury of the Dons support with what they believed was a blatant dive but which resulted in the dismissal of Aberdeen's Doug Rougvie and a Rangers victory. Then, the following season, Aberdeen's John McMaster had to be given the kiss of life at Ibrox after a stamp on his throat by Willie Johnston. Relations between fans were further soured during a league match on 8 October 1988, when Aberdeen player Neil Simpson's tackle on Rangers' Ian Durrant resulted in Durrant being injured for two years. Resentment continued and in 1998 an article in a Rangers match programme branded Aberdeen fans "scum", although Rangers later issued a "full and unreserved apology" to Aberdeen and their supporters, which was accepted by Aberdeen.

Rangers' relaunch in the Third Division in the 2012–13 season led to the club's original rivalry with Queen's Park being renewed for the first time since 1958 in the league. Rangers and Queen's Park first played each other in March 1879, some nine years before the start of the Old Firm rivalry. Matches with Queen's Park were advertised as the "Original Glasgow derby" by Rangers and the Scottish media; and as the "Oldest Derby in the World" by Queen's Park.

=== Sectarianism ===
John Ure Primrose, chairman of Rangers from 1912 to 1923, has been described as sharpening Rangers' Protestant Unionist identity and anti-Catholic identity, contributing to the absence of openly Catholic players from the team. From the early 20th century onwards, Rangers had a policy of not signing Catholic players, or employing Catholics in other prominent roles.

In 1989, Rangers signed Mo Johnston, "their first major Roman Catholic signing". Johnston was the first high-profile Catholic to sign for the club since the World War I era, though other Catholics had signed for Rangers before. Since Johnston's signing, an influx of overseas footballers has contributed to Catholic players becoming commonplace at Rangers. In 1999, Lorenzo Amoruso became the first Catholic captain of the club.

Rangers partnered with Celtic to form the Old Firm Alliance, an initiative aimed at educating children from across Glasgow about issues like healthy eating and fitness, as well as awareness of anti-social behaviour, sectarianism and racism. The club's Follow With Pride campaign was launched in 2007 to improve the club's image and build on previous anti-sectarian and anti-racist campaigns. (Note: Racism has been directed at players on the pitch at Rangers games, including at former Celtic player Bobo Balde.) William Gaillard, UEFA's Director of Communications, commended the SFA and Scottish clubs, including Rangers, for their actions in fighting discrimination. In September 2007, UEFA praised Rangers for the measures the club has taken against sectarianism.

Sectarian chanting by supporters has continued to incur criticism and sanctions upon the club as well as convictions against individuals identified. In 1999, the vice-chairman of The Rangers Football Club Ltd, Donald Findlay, resigned after being filmed singing sectarian songs during a supporters club event. UEFA's Control and Disciplinary Body has punished Rangers for incidents during European ties, most notably Villarreal in 2006, Osasuna in 2007, PSV Eindhoven in 2011, and at Ibrox in 2019. In February 2015, following sectarian singing from Rangers fans at a match at Raith Rovers, the SPFL came in for criticism for their failure or inability to deal with the issue. However, there have been cases of the police and courts taking action, with Rangers fans having been charged, convicted and jailed for sectarian behaviour.

Rangers' use of orange and blue change strips, first worn in 1993–94, once in 2002–03 and reintroduced in 2018–19 and 2022–23, has caused controversy because the colours are seen as referencing the Orange Order.

=== Politics ===
Rangers have historically embodied a stark Protestant, Unionist and Monarchist identity, deeply intertwined with British Loyalism in Scotland and Northern Ireland. Academics argue that the club has long served as a symbolic expression of Britishness in Scotland, often associated with the political right and the Conservative Party. Until 1989, Rangers informally refused to sign Catholic players, reinforcing its image as a bastion of Protestant identity. Supporters frequently express their unionist and Orange affiliations through songs, emblems, and banners, with many fans attending sectarian Orange Order events and adopting symbols such as the Union Jack and slogans like "We are the people." In the 2000s, Rangers fanzines like "Follow Follow" and "The Number One" openly promoted a loyalist and unionist agenda. Surveys from 1990 and 2001 showed Rangers fans to be the most likely in Scotland to support the Conservative Party, oppose a British withdrawal from Northern Ireland and oppose the Scottish National Party. Despite Rangers' supporters higher likelihood of Conservative identification compared to other clubs, Conservative Rangers supporters remained a minority, tallying 32% and "over 30%" in 1990 and 2001, respectively.

In response to the Green Brigade, a Celtic ultras group who support Palestinian nationalism and wave Palestinian flags at games, some Rangers supporters have signaled support for Israel and waved Israeli flags.

In the 2020s, Rangers hired former Democratic Unionist Party politician David Graham as their head of public relations. Graham was later promoted to the position of general manager at the club, until the position was abolished.

=== Friendships ===
Supporters of Rangers have a fan friendship with the Northern Irish club Linfield, dating back to 1920. Two of the founders of the club Moses and Peter McNeil have a Northern Irish connection through the County Down birth of their mother Jean Bain, who after moving to Scotland for work in the mid-19th century married a Scotsman, John McNeil. From Rangers formation to the present day, the club have had 32 players who were born in either Northern Ireland, the Republic of Ireland and previously Ireland (from 1882 to 1950). A number were former Linfield players, and they have contributed much to the success of Rangers Football Club. Three former Northern Irish players have captained Rangers – Bert Manderson, John McClelland and Steven Davis; six from a Northern Irish connection have been elevated to the Rangers 'Hall of Fame' and one – Jimmy Nicholl – was the club's assistant manager in 2018.

The fans of Rangers also have a fan-friendship with the German club Hamburger SV, dating from the 1970s when Scots moved to the German port in search of work and reinforced by their shared affection for the midfielder Jörg Albertz. This link was formalised in February 2021 with the formation of an official club partnership between the two sides. Conversely, Celtic fans have a long-standing friendship with Hamburger SV's city rivals, FC St. Pauli. The friendship exists due to both the Rangers-HSV affinity and the shared left-wing politics of Celtic and St. Pauli fans.

=== Controversies ===
Some Rangers fans have been accused of making Nazi salutes, most notably at a UEFA Cup game in Israel in 2007, although the gestures were later clarified as being "red hand salutes", identified with the loyalist movement. In 2013, a Rangers fan was banned from attending football games for two years after being found guilty of giving a Nazi salute at a youth cup final game. A flag featuring the Nazi SS Totenkopf has been flown by Rangers fans in both 2023 and 2024, with the club launching an investigation after one of the flags was flown at Ibrox Stadium.

In 2003, Rangers chairman John McClelland vowed to "weed out" those who among the Rangers support who "indulge in racist behaviour" after Celtic players Bobo Balde and Momo Sylla were subjected to racist abuse. In March 2015, Rangers director Chris Graham resigned his position after posting derogatory comments about Muslims on social media. In April 2017, a Rangers fan was seen on TV making racist 'monkey gestures' towards Celtic winger Scott Sinclair and banned for life. In August 2019, UEFA ordered Rangers to close a part of their stadium after their fans were found guilty of 'racist chanting'.

In July 2020, Rangers defender Connor Goldson was criticised by some Rangers fans for supporting the Black Lives Matter movement, he described the fans' reaction as "hate" and "ignorance", he was supported by ex-Rangers player Maurice Edu, who also expressed his "embarrassment" and "disappointment" with some Rangers fans' reaction to the Black Lives Matter movement. These events led Rangers CEO Stewart Robertson to condemn the racial abuse of Rangers players by stating "if you are unable to support our players, regardless of their background, you are not welcome at Ibrox".

In 2021, groups of Rangers supporters were widely criticised, including by Nicola Sturgeon, John Swinney and Humza Yousaf, after they gathered in George Square to celebrate the club winning the Scottish Premiership. 53 Rangers supporters were arrested following the celebration, which was in breach of COVID-19 lockdown regulations, and in excess of £58,000 worth of damage was done to the square.

== Ownership and finances ==
=== From incorporation to liquidation ===
On 27 May 1899, Rangers Football Club incorporated, forming The Rangers Football Club Ltd. No single shareholding exceeded 50% until 1985 when the Lawrence Group increased its shareholding in Rangers to a 52% majority, following a deal with then club vice-chairman Jack Gillespie. In November 1988, head of the Lawrence Group Lawrence Marlborough sold out to David Murray for £6 million. In 2000, David Murray decided to list the company on the stock exchange (making it a public limited company), with the name of the company being changed to The Rangers Football Club plc.

On 6 May 2011, Craig Whyte bought David Murray's shares for £1. On 13 February 2012, Whyte filed legal papers at the Court of Session giving notice of his intention to appoint administrators. The next day, The Rangers Football Club plc – which was subsequently renamed RFC 2012 plc – entered administration over non-payment of £9 million in PAYE and VAT taxes to HM Revenue and Customs. In April the administrators estimated that the club's total debts could top £134m which was largely dependent on the outcome of a First Tier Tax Tribunal concerning a disputed tax bill in relation to an Employee Benefit Trust ("EBT") scheme employed by the club since 2001. However, on 20 November 2012, the Tribunal ruled in favour of Rangers. Had that decision been upheld the tax bill could have been significantly reduced from an estimated £74m to under £2m. An Upper Tribunal upheld the decision in 2014. HMRC then appealed to the Court of Session, which ruled in November 2015 that Rangers should have paid tax and national insurance on the EBT payments.

On 25 June 2012, the Crown Office asked Strathclyde Police to investigate the purchase of Rangers and the club's subsequent financial management during Whyte's tenure.

Charles Green agreed a deal with the administrators of The Rangers Football Club plc to purchase the company for £8.5 million if a proposed CVA was agreed or to purchase its business and assets for a £5.5million if the proposed CVA were to be rejected. On 14 June 2012, the formal rejection of the proposed CVA meant that the company would enter the liquidation process. The accountancy firm BDO was appointed to investigate the years of financial mismanagement at the club.

=== Current corporate identity ===
On 14 June 2012, hours after the CVA's rejection, Sevco Scotland Ltd, a new company formed by Charles Green's consortium for this eventuality, completed the purchase of the business and assets of The Rangers Football Club Plc and then, on 18 June 2012, formally applied to acquire the SPL share of The Rangers Football Club plc. On 4 July, SPL clubs voted by 10–1 to reject the application with Kilmarnock abstaining and the old Rangers company voting in favour. Thereafter, an application to the Scottish Football League was successful with Rangers securing associate membership on 13 July 2012 at an SFL meeting by a vote of 29–1. The SFL member clubs voted that Rangers should enter the fourth tier of Scottish Football, Scottish Third Division for the 2012–13 season, rather than the Scottish First Division.

An application was made for a transfer of SFA membership on 29 June 2012, with the new company applying for the transfer of the membership of The Rangers Football Club plc. Agreement was reached on the transfer with the new company accepting a number of conditions relating to the old company.

At the end of 2012, Rangers International Football Club plc became the holding company for the group, having acquired The Rangers Football Club Ltd on the basis of a one for one share exchange. In 2013, after its first 13 months, the company reported operating losses of £14.4m. Thereafter it continued to post annual operating losses, variously £9.8m in 2014 and £9.9m in 2015, £2.5m in 2016, £6.3m in 2017 and £13.2m in 2018, until returning to profit in 2022.

In June 2025, the consortium Rangers FC LLC, headed by US businessman Andrew Cavenagh and 49ers Enterprises, the investment arm of the San Francisco 49ers, purchased 51% of shares to compete a multi-million pound takeover of the club.

Remaining major shareholders of the club included former chairman Douglas Park, George Taylor and Stuart Gibson, who all held at least a 5% shareholding.

Dave King, who had been the largest individual shareholder since leading the regime change in 2015, and John Bennett, chairman from 2023 to 2024, both divested their entire shareholding.

== Social responsibility ==
=== Support for charities ===
The Rangers Charity Foundation was created in 2002 and participates in a wide range of charitable work, regularly involving Rangers staff and star players. The foundation also has partnerships with UNICEF, The Prostate Cancer Charity and Erskine, and is responsible for over £2.3 million in donations. As well as fundraising, the Rangers Charity Foundation regularly bring sick, disabled and disadvantaged children to attend matches and tours at Ibrox, with the chance to meet the players.

Through its support of the Rangers Charity Foundation, the club has helped a number of charities with support and financial donations. In 2008, the club became the first Scottish side to be selected as a partner club of UNICEF. The club's Charity Foundation has backed initiatives in Togo and India as well as funding one million vaccinations for a children's vaccination programme. The club has been a firm supporter of Erskine, a charity which provides long-term medical care for veterans of the British Armed Forces, and in 2012, donated £25,000 to fund projects within their care homes. In January 2015, Rangers hosted a charity match for the benefit of former player Fernando Ricksen who had been diagnosed with motor neurone disease; this raised £320,000 for him and MND Scotland.

=== Work in the community ===
Alongside its work with numerous charities, the club and its Charity Foundation operate various initiatives within the community including courses to help Armed Forces veterans overcome addictions, to raise awareness of social issues and help unemployed people back into work. In October 2015, the club launched its Ready2Succeed programme which was a ten-week course designed to develop participants confidence and employability skills by engaging with football and fitness. Rangers first-team players also visit the Royal Hospital for Children in Glasgow every year during the festive period where they hand out presents to the children and donate money to the hospital activity fund.

== Popular culture ==
The club featured on BBC Scotland comedy Scotch and Wry in 1979 in a scene where Manager (Rikki Fulton) and Chief Scout (Gregor Fisher) unknowingly sign a young Catholic footballer (Gerard Kelly) but then try to void his contract to avoid publicly breaking the club's "No Catholic" signing policy after finding out.

In 2002, former Rangers striker Ally McCoist starred in Robert Duvall's film A Shot at Glory as Jackie McQuillan, where he would play against Rangers in the Scottish Cup Final for "Kilnockie F.C.", a fictional side.

In 2003, a Scottish television documentary series filmed by BBC Scotland, Blue Heaven, followed aspiring young footballers at Rangers as they tried to forge a career in football. The series was originally broadcast in the winter of 2003 with a follow-up episode in 2011.

In 2008, celebrity chef and former Rangers youth player Gordon Ramsay returned to the club to teach them how to cook in Series 4, Episode 12 of The F Word.

Owing to the notoriety of the "Rangers Inter City Firm", a football firm associated with the club, Rangers have also featured in television documentaries and books about football hooliganism, including Series 1, Episode 5 of The Real Football Factories presented by English actor Danny Dyer on Bravo in 2006, during which he visits his first Old Firm match and meets football casuals from Rangers, Celtic, Aberdeen, Hibernian, Dundee United and Dundee.

Rangers have appeared in theatre a number of times in shows such as Follow Follow: The Rangers Story at the King's Theatre in 1994 starring Scottish actors Barbara Rafferty, Alexander Morton, Jonathan Watson, Iain Robertson, Ronnie Letham and Stuart Bowman; Singin' I'm No A Billy He's A Tim at the Pavilion Theatre in 2009; Divided City at the Citizens Theatre in 2011; and, more recently, Billy and Tim and the Wee Glesga Ghost in 2015 and Rally Roon the Rangers in 2019 and 2022, both at the Pavilion Theatre in Glasgow.

William Orcutt Cushing's hymn "Follow On", also known as "Down in the Valley with My Saviour I Would Go" or "I Will Follow Jesus", has been adopted as the anthem of Rangers in their club song "Follow Follow". The club has also played the Tina Turner song "The Best" when the teams exit the tunnel before kick off.

In October 2023, K-pop girl group STAYC went viral when during a concert in Dallas, Texas, US, they wore cropped 1996–97 season Rangers shirts instead of uniforms from the local Major League Baseball team, the Texas Rangers. A club spokesman said that the moment had "triggered nostalgia for the Light Blues". When the group traveled to the UK the following month for the Korea On Stage show at Wembley, the club welcomed them to Ibrox Stadium and their adjoining event facility, Edmiston House.

== Records ==
=== Club ===
Highest attendance
143,570 vs Hibernian, 27 March 1948
UK record home attendance
118,567 vs Celtic, 2 January 1939
Highest European attendance
100,000 vs Dynamo Kyiv, 16 September 1987
World record fourth-tier attendance
50,048 vs Berwick Rangers, 4 May 2013
Unbeaten league seasons
1898–99 (Rangers won all of their 18 league matches) and 2020–21
Highest scoring match
14–2 vs Whitehill, 29 September 1883
14–2 vs Blairgowrie, 20 January 1934
Record league victory
10–0 vs Hibernian, 24 December 1898

=== Player ===
Record appearances
Dougie Gray, 940 appearances, 1925–1947
Most league appearances
Sandy Archibald, 513 appearances, 1917–1934
Record goalscorer
Jimmy Smith, 381 goals, 1929–1946
Most league goals
Jimmy Smith, 300 goals, 1929–1946
Most Scotland caps whilst playing at Rangers
Ally McCoist, 61 caps, 1983–1998

== Players ==
=== First-team squad ===
As of 22 September 2026

Note: Flags indicate national team as defined under FIFA eligibility rules; some limited exceptions apply. Players may hold more than one non-FIFA nationality.

No.	Pos.	Nation	Player
1	GK	CRO	Ivor Pandur
2	DF	SCO	Ross McCrorie
4	DF	ENG	Ben Godfrey (on loan from Atalanta)
5	DF	SCO	John Souttar
6	MF	ENG	Dan Neil (vice-captain)
7	FW	SCO	Lawrence Shankland (captain)
9	FW	POR	Youssef Chermiti
10	FW	KOR	Kim Min-su
14	MF	AUS	Cammy Devlin
15	MF	ECU	José Cifuentes
17	MF	JPN	Daisuke Yokota
18	DF	SRB	Kosta Nedeljković (on loan from Aston Villa)
19	FW	VEN	Kevin Kelsy
20	FW	CZE	Ryan Naderi

No.	Pos.	Nation	Player
21	DF	ENG	Dujon Sterling
22	MF	SRB	Vanja Dragojević
23	FW	MTN	Djeidi Gassama
24	DF	RSA	Olwethu Makhanya
25	DF	BEL	Tuur Rommens
26	FW	ALG	Badredine Bouanani (on loan from Stuttgart)
28	FW	MKD	Bojan Miovski
29	DF	SCO	James Penrice (on loan from AEK Athens)
31	GK	SCO	Liam Kelly
37	DF	NGR	Emmanuel Fernandez
42	MF	DEN	Tochi Chukwuani
43	MF	BEL	Nicolas Raskin
45	FW	NIR	Ross McCausland
52	MF	SCO	Findlay Curtis

=== On loan ===
Note: Flags indicate national team as defined under FIFA eligibility rules; some limited exceptions apply. Players may hold more than one non-FIFA nationality.

No.	Pos.	Nation	Player
8	MF	SCO	Connor Barron (on loan at Middlesbrough)
11	MF	NOR	Thelo Aasgaard (on loan at Anderlecht)
16	MF	SCO	Lyall Cameron (on loan at Dundee United)
41	DF	SCO	Zander Hutton (on loan at Queen of the South)
46	MF	SCO	Calum Adamson (on loan at Raith Rovers)
48	MF	ENG	Paul Nsio (on loan at St Mirren)
49	MF	SCO	Bailey Rice (on loan at Kilmarnock)
50	GK	SCO	Greig Thackray (on loan at Auchinleck Talbot)
54	GK	NIR	Mason Munn (on loan at Dumbarton)
55	DF	SCO	Jack Wyllie (on loan at Forfar Athletic)
56	FW	ENG	Zebedee Lawson (on loan at Queen's Park)
59	MF	NIR	Callum Burnside (on loan at Airdrieonians)

No.	Pos.	Nation	Player
60	DF	SCO	Lyle Wark (on loan at Auchinleck Talbot)
61	MF	SCO	Lewis Stewart (co-operation loan with Queen's Park)
62	MF	SCO	Alexander Smith (on loan at East Kilbride)
64	MF	SCO	Aiden McCallion (co-operation loan with Queen's Park)
68	MF	SCO	Aiden Crilly (co-operation loan with Alloa Athletic)
69	DF	SCO	Oliver Hynd (on loan at Cumbernauld Colts)
70	FW	SCO	Max Cameron (co-operation loan with Alloa Athletic)
72	MF	SCO	Kyle Glasgow (co-operation loan with Alloa Athletic)
93	FW	SCO	Cormac Christie (on loan at Brechin City)
99	FW	BRA	Danilo (on loan at Botafogo)
—	MF	ALB	Nedim Bajrami (on loan at Al-Taawoun)
—	FW	COL	Óscar Cortés (on loan at Huracán)

=== Academy squads ===
For more details on the academy squads, see Rangers F.C. B Team and Academy.

=== Retired and reserved numbers ===
- Number 12 is reserved for the fans (often referred to as the 12th man)

== Staff ==
=== Board of directors ===
Rangers is owned and operated by The Rangers Football Club Limited ("TRFCL"), which, in turn, is a subsidiary of the holding company Rangers International Football Club Limited ("RIFC"). The latter company, RIFC, also owns other corporations related to Rangers including Rangers Retail Ltd, Rangers Media Ltd and Garrion Security Services Ltd who are responsible for providing match day security at Ibrox Stadium.

Rangers International Football Club Limited

As of 1 July 2026

Position	Name
Chairman	Andrew Cavenagh
Vice-chairman	Paraag Marathe
Executive director	Fraser Thornton
Non-executive directors	Andrew Clayton
Non-executive directors	John Halsted
Non-executive directors	Gene Schneur
Non-executive directors	Mark Taber
Non-executive directors	George Taylor

Corporate staff

As of 1 July 2026

Position	Name
Chief executive officer	Jim Gillespie
Performance director	Stig Inge Bjørnebye
Finance director	Sara Bishop
Commercial director	Natalie Nairn
Company secretary and legal director	Graham Horsman
Club secretary	Amanda Millar

=== First-team staff ===
As of 31 July 2026

Position	Name
Manager	Derek McInnes
Assistant managers	Alan Archibald; Paul Sheerin
First team coach	Craig Clark
Goalkeeping coach	Allan McGregor
Head of recruitment	Robbie Thelwell
Chief scout	Nathan Fisher
Scouts	Max Ashmore; Jamie Miller; Oliver O'Connell; Mick Priest
Head of performance	Jamie Ramsden
First team performance coach	James Barrow
Head of performance physiotherapy	Craig Maitland
Head of nutrition and performance coach	Craig Flannigan
Physical performance coach	Calum MacMaster
Strength and conditioning coach	Samuel Harrison
Physiotherapist	Jonathon Skinner
Head of medical	Kevin Bain
Doctor	Christopher Milne
Head of soft tissue therapy	David Lavery
Soft tissue therapist	Ruari Yeoman
Analysts	Euan Fotheringham; Graeme Stevenson
Data insights lead	Jaymes Monte
Kit operations managers	Jim McAlister; David MacGregor

== Managers ==
Twenty-two men (including two repeat appointments) have been manager of Rangers during the club's history. In addition, twelve men have taken charge of the side on a caretaker basis, while five served as secretaries choosing the team, prior to the appointment of the club's first full-time manager, William Wilton, in 1899.

The longest-serving manager was Bill Struth, who served for 34 years and 26 days. Rangers have had six foreign managers during their history: Dick Advocaat, Paul Le Guen, Pedro Caixinha, Giovanni van Bronckhorst, Philippe Clement and Danny Röhl. Graeme Souness is the only player-manager during Rangers' history. There have been two repeat appointments: Jock Wallace and Walter Smith.

The most successful manager, in terms of the number of trophies won, is Bill Struth, with eighteen League titles, ten Scottish Cups and two League Cups. Rangers' other manager with notable success was William Waddell, who won the European Cup Winners' Cup.

Name	Period
(Scotland) William Wilton	1899–1920
(Scotland) Bill Struth	1920–1954
(Scotland) Scot Symon	1954–1967
(Scotland) David White	1967–1969
(Scotland) Willie Waddell	1969–1972
(Scotland) Jock Wallace	1972–1978
(Scotland) Jock Wallace	1983–1986
(Scotland) John Greig	1978–1983
(Scotland) Graeme Souness	1986–1991
(Scotland) Walter Smith	1991–1998
(Scotland) Walter Smith	2007–2011
(Netherlands) Dick Advocaat	1998–2001
(Scotland) Alex McLeish	2001–2006

Name	Period
(France) Paul Le Guen	2006–2007
(Scotland) Ally McCoist	2011–2014
(England) Mark Warburton	2015–2017
(Portugal) Pedro Caixinha	2017
(England) Steven Gerrard	2018–2021
(Netherlands) Giovanni van Bronckhorst	2021–2022
(England) Michael Beale	2022–2023
(Belgium) Philippe Clement	2023–2025
(Scotland) Russell Martin	2025
(Germany) Danny Röhl	2025–2026
(Scotland) Derek McInnes	2026–

== Honours ==
As of 17 December 2023

Type	Competition	Titles	Seasons
Domestic	Scottish League Championship	55	1890–91, (Note: Shared with Dumbarton F.C. after both clubs ended the season on 29 points. A play-off game at Cathkin Park on 21 May 1891 finished 2–2, so the clubs were declared joint champions.) 1898–99, 1899–1900, 1900–01, 1901–02, 1910–11, 1911–12, 1912–13, 1917–18, 1919–20, 1920–21, 1922–23, 1923–24, 1924–25, 1926–27, 1927–28, 1928–29, 1929–30, 1930–31, 1932–33, 1933–34, 1934–35, 1936–37, 1938–39, 1946–47, 1948–49, 1949–50, 1952–53, 1955–56, 1956–57, 1958–59, 1960–61, 1962–63, 1963–64, 1974–75, 1975–76, 1977–78, 1986–87, 1988–89, 1989–90, 1990–91, 1991–92, 1992–93, 1993–94, 1994–95, 1995–96, 1996–97, 1998–99, 1999–2000, 2002–03, 2004–05, 2008–09, 2009–10, 2010–11, 2020–21
Domestic	Scottish second-tier League Championship	1	2015–16
Domestic	Scottish third-tier League Championship	1	2013–14
Domestic	Scottish fourth-tier League Championship	1	2012–13
Domestic	Scottish Cup	34	1893–94, 1896–97, 1897–98, 1902–03, 1927–28, 1929–30, 1931–32, 1933–34, 1934–35, 1935–36, 1947–48, 1948–49, 1949–50, 1952–53, 1959–60, 1961–62, 1962–63, 1963–64, 1965–66, 1972–73, 1975–76, 1977–78, 1978–79, 1980–81, 1991–92, 1992–93, 1995–96, 1998–99, 1999–2000, 2001–02, 2002–03, 2007–08, 2008–09, 2021–22
Domestic	Scottish League Cup	28	1946–47, 1948–49, 1960–61, 1961–62, 1963–64, 1964–65, 1970–71, 1975–76, 1977–78, 1978–79, 1981–82, 1983–84, 1984–85, 1986–87, 1987–88, 1988–89, 1990–91, 1992–93, 1993–94, 1996–97, 1998–99, 2001–02, 2002–03, 2004–05, 2007–08, 2009–10, 2010–11, 2023–24
Domestic	Scottish Challenge Cup	1	2015–16
Continental	European Cup Winners' Cup	1	1971–72

- record

=== Other honours ===
- European Cup Winners' Cup:
  - Runners-up (2): 1960–61, 1966–67
- UEFA Cup/UEFA Europa League:
  - Runners-up (2): 2007–08, 2021–22
- UEFA Super Cup:
  - Runners-up (1): 1972

=== Doubles and trebles ===
- League Title, Scottish Cup, League Cup: 7

1948–49, 1963–64, 1975–76, 1977–78, 1992–93, 1998–99, 2002–03

- League Title and Scottish Cup: 11

1927–28, 1929–30, 1933–34, 1934–35, 1949–50, 1952–53, 1962–63, 1991–92, 1995–96, 1999–2000, 2008–09

- League Title and League Cup: 10

1946–47, 1960–61, 1986–87, 1988–89, 1990–91, 1993–94, 1996–97, 2004–05, 2009–10, 2010–11

- Scottish Cup and League Cup: 4

1961–62, 1978–79, 2001–02, 2007–08

=== Notable statistics ===
Rangers became the first British side to reach a UEFA-sanctioned European final in 1961.

== UEFA club coefficient rankings ==
As of 15 July 2026

Ranking	Club	Country	2025/26 Points	Total Points	National Association Points
46	Copenhagen	(Denmark)	12.000	41.375	6.861
47	Midtjylland	(Denmark)	21.500	41.250	6.861
48	Monaco	(France)	15.000	41.000	13.016
49	Rangers	(Scotland)	3.000	40.250	4.830
50	Athletic Club	(Spain)	12.000	38.750	15.723
51	Galatasaray	(Turkey)	17.750	38.500	9.035
52	Marseille	(France)	12.000	38.000	13.016

== Notable former players ==
=== Club captains ===
For further information, see Rangers club captains.

Name	Period
(Scotland) Tom Vallance	1876–1882
(Scotland) David Mitchell	1882–1894
(Scotland) John McPherson	1894–1898
(Scotland) Robert Hamilton	1898–1906
(Scotland) Robert Campbell	1906–1916
(Scotland) Tommy Cairns	1916–1926
(Ireland) Bert Manderson	1926–1927
(Scotland) Tommy Muirhead	1927–1930
(Scotland) David Meiklejohn	1930–1938
(Scotland) Jimmy Simpson	1938–1940
(Scotland) Jock Shaw	1940–1957
(Scotland) George Young	1953–1957
(Scotland) Ian McColl	1957–1960
(Scotland) Eric Caldow	1960–1962
(Scotland) Bobby Shearer	1962–1965
(Scotland) John Greig	1965–1978
(Scotland) Derek Johnstone	1978–1983
(Northern Ireland) John McClelland	1983–1984
(Scotland) Craig Paterson	1984–1986

Name	Period
(England) Terry Butcher	1986–1990
(Scotland) Richard Gough	1990–1997
(Scotland) Richard Gough	1997–1998
(Denmark) Brian Laudrup	1997
(Italy) Lorenzo Amoruso	1998–2000
(Scotland) Barry Ferguson	2000–2003
(Scotland) Barry Ferguson	2005–2007
(Scotland) Barry Ferguson	2007–2009
(Australia) Craig Moore	2003–2004
(Germany) Stefan Klos	2004–2005
(Scotland) Gavin Rae	2007
(Scotland) David Weir	2009–2012
(Northern Ireland) Steven Davis	2012
(United States) Carlos Bocanegra	2012
(Scotland) Lee McCulloch	2012–2015
(Scotland) Lee Wallace	2015–2018
(England) James Tavernier	2018–2026
(Scotland) Lawrence Shankland	2026–

The "Greatest Ever" Rangers 11 chosen by fans in 1999. The manager chosen was Walter Smith. (Note: Choices were limited to post World War II era players only.)

=== Greatest-ever team ===
The following team was voted the greatest ever Rangers team by supporters in 1999. When the vote was launched it was feared that younger voters would ignore the great service of many of the pre-war stars (notably the most successful captain and most successful manager the club has ever had, Davie Meiklejohn and Bill Struth respectively). When the ballot was launched Donald Findlay stated it would be limited to post Second World War players because "few can recall players of these earlier eras":

- (Scotland) Andy Goram
- (Scotland) Sandy Jardine
- (Scotland) Richard Gough
- (England) Terry Butcher
- (Scotland) John Greig – voted Rangers' greatest-ever player
- (Denmark) Brian Laudrup – voted Rangers' greatest-ever foreign player
- (England) Paul Gascoigne
- (Scotland) Jim Baxter – voted Rangers' third greatest-ever player
- (Scotland) Davie Cooper
- (Scotland) Ally McCoist – voted Rangers' second greatest-ever player
- (England) Mark Hateley

=== Scottish Football Hall of Fame ===
As of 1 June 2020, 33 players and managers to have been involved with Rangers in their careers have entered the Scottish Football Hall of Fame:

- (Scotland) John Greig – 2004 Inaugural Inductee
- (Scotland) Graeme Souness – 2004 Inaugural Inductee
- (Scotland) Sir Alex Ferguson – 2004 Inaugural Inductee
- (Scotland) Jim Baxter – 2004 Inaugural Inductee
- (Scotland) Willie Woodburn – 2004 Inaugural Inductee
- (Scotland) Alex McLeish – 2005 Inductee
- (Scotland) Willie Waddell – 2005 Inductee
- (Scotland) George Young – 2005 Inductee
- (Scotland) Alan Morton – 2005 Inductee
- (Scotland) Davie Cooper – 2006 Inductee
- (Denmark) Brian Laudrup – 2006 Inductee
- (Scotland) Sandy Jardine – 2006 Inductee
- (Scotland) Willie Henderson – 2006 Inductee
- (Scotland) Richard Gough – 2006 Inductee
- (Scotland) Walter Smith – 2007 Inductee
- (Scotland) Ally McCoist – 2007 Inductee
- (Scotland) Eric Caldow – 2007 Inductee
- (Scotland) Derek Johnstone – 2008 Inductee
- (Scotland) Bill Struth – 2008 Inductee
- (Scotland) David Meiklejohn – 2009 Inductee
- (Scotland) Mo Johnston – 2009 Inductee
- (Scotland) Andy Goram – 2010 Inductee
- (Scotland) Robert Smyth McColl – 2011 Inductee
- (England) Terry Butcher – 2011 Inductee
- (Scotland) Bob McPhail – 2012 Inductee
- (Scotland) Scot Symon – 2013 Inductee
- (Scotland) Davie Wilson – 2014 Inductee
- (Scotland) Bobby Brown – 2015 Inductee
- (Scotland) Jock Wallace – 2016 Inductee
- (Scotland) Archie Knox – 2018 Inductee
- (Scotland) Ian McMillan – 2018 Inductee
- (Scotland) Tommy McLean – 2019 Inductee
- (Scotland) Colin Stein – 2019 Inductee

=== Scottish FA International Roll of Honour ===
The Scottish FA International Roll of Honour recognises players who have gained 50 or more international caps for Scotland. As of 1 July 2021, the 10 inductees to have won caps while playing for Rangers are:

- (Scotland) David Weir – 2006 Inductee, 69 Caps
- (Scotland) Kenny Miller – 2010 Inductee, 69 Caps
- (Scotland) Christian Dailly – 2003 Inductee, 67 Caps
- (Scotland) Richard Gough – 1990 Inductee, 61 Caps
- (Scotland) Ally McCoist – 1996 Inductee, 61 Caps
- (Scotland) George Young – 1956 Inductee, 54 Caps
- (Scotland) Graeme Souness – 1985 Inductee, 54 Caps
- (Scotland) Colin Hendry – 2001 Inductee, 51 Caps
- (Scotland) Steven Naismith – 2019 Inductee, 51 Caps
- (Scotland) Alan Hutton – 2016 Inductee, 50 Caps

=== Scottish Sports Hall of Fame ===
Three Rangers players have been selected in the Scottish Sports Hall of Fame, they are:

- (Scotland) Jim Baxter – 2002 Inductee
- (Scotland) John Greig – 2002 Inductee
- (Scotland) Ally McCoist – 2007 Inductee

=== Greatest-ever Ranger ===
John Greig was voted the greatest ever Rangers player in 1999. He was announced as Honorary Life President in 2015.

== Sponsors ==
As of 10 September 2026, Rangers are sponsored by:

=== Official partners ===
- Official Kit Manufacturer, Retail, Merchandise and Licensing Partner – Umbro
- Principal Club Sponsor – Kindred Group
- Official Shirt Sponsor – Unibet
- Official Training Kit Partner – 32Red
- Official Presenting Partner – Park's Motor Group
- Official Upper Back of Shirt Sponsor and Logistics Partner – Seko Logistics
- Official Sleeve Partner – BOXT
- Official Academy Partner – Carrick Packaging
- Official Lager Partner – Tennent's Lager
- Official Breakfast Cereals Partner – Kellogg's
- Official Digital Auction Supplier – MatchWornShirt
- Official FX Transfer Partner – Ebury

=== Associate partners ===
- Official Restaurant Partner – Black Rooster
- Official Engineering Partner – Forrest Precision Engineering
- Official Cyber Security Partner – NordVPN
- Official Electrical and Security Partner – JC Electrical & Security Solutions
- Official Ground Engineering Partner – Northern Piling
- Official eSIM Partner – Saily

=== Official suppliers ===
- Official Television Suppliers – Sky Sports
  Premier Sports
- Official League Betting Partner – William Hill
- Official Food and Beverage Partner – Elior UK
- Official Confectionery Partner – Nestlé
- Official Soft Drink Supplier – Coca-Cola
- Official Hydration Partner – Lucozade Sport
- Official Personal Care Supplier – Molton Brown
- Official Clothing Partner – Suited & Booted
- Official Air Conditioning Partner – CSD Air Conditioning
- Official Rangers Legends Events Supplier – 5 Stars

A full list of Rangers commercial partners and sponsors can be found on the official club website and in the Rangers matchday programme, available at every home game.

== See also ==
- Football in Scotland
- Union Bears
