= 1923–24 Rangers F.C. season =

Rangers
1923–24 season
- Chairman: William Craig; Joseph Buchanan (from November)
- Manager: Bill Struth
- Ground: Ibrox Park
- Scottish League Division One: 1st P38 W25 D9 L4 F72 A29 Pts59
- Scottish Cup: Third round
- Top goalscorer: League: Geordie Henderson (19); All: Geordie Henderson (23)

The 1923–24 season was the 50th season of competitive football by Rangers.

== Overview ==
Rangers played a total of 41 competitive matches during the 1923–24 season. The team finished top of the league, nine points ahead of second placed Airdrieonians, after winning twenty-five of the 38 league games.

The side was knocked out of the Scottish Cup in the third round that season. After overcoming Lochgelly United and St Mirren, a 2–1 defeat to Hibernian ended the campaign.

== Results ==
All results are written with Rangers' score first.

=== Scottish League Division One ===
Date	Opponent	Venue	Result	Attendance	Scorers
18 August 1923	Motherwell	A	3–0	22,000	Cunningham (2), Morton
21 August 1923	Falkirk	H	2–2	18,000	Cunningham (pen), Morton
25 August 1923	St Mirren	H	5–0	20,000	Cairns (2), Muirhead, Cunningham, Henderson
8 September 1923	Morton	A	1–0	15,000	Cunningham
17 September 1923	Hearts	A	0–0	24,000	
22 September 1923	Aberdeen	H	2–0	20,000	Cunningham (pen), Henderson
24 September 1923	Clyde	H	2–1	12,000	Cairns, Craig
6 October 1923	Dundee	A	4–1	22,000	Henderson (3), Archibald
13 October 1923	Ayr United	H	5–0	15,000	Meiklejohn (2), Henderson (2), Craig
20 October 1923	Hibernian	A	3–1	22,000	Meiklejohn, Henderson, Morton
27 October 1923	Celtic	H	0–0	38,000	
3 November 1923	Partick Thistle	A	6–0	35,000	Morton (3), Cunningham, Henderson, Cairns
10 November 1923	Third Lanark	H	2–0	15,000	Meiklejohn, Muirhead
17 November 1923	Falkirk	A	1–0	16,000	Cunningham (pen)
24 November 1923	Airdrieonians	H	0–0	20,000	
1 December 1923	Clydebank	A	2–1	10,000	Cunningham, Cairns
8 December 1923	Queen's Park	H	1–1	15,000	Meiklejohn
15 December 1923	Raith Rovers	A	1–0	20,000	Henderson
22 December 1923	Hamilton	H	4–0	10,000	Henderson (3), Archibald
29 December 1923	St Mirren	A	0–0	12,000	
1 January 1924	Celtic	A	2–2	60,000	Cairns, Archibald
2 January 1924	Partick Thistle	H	1–0	30,000	Cunningham
5 January 1924	Ayr United	A	1–2	14,000	Cairns
12 January 1924	Dundee	H	1–1	10,000	Craig
19 January 1924	Hamilton	A	3–2	12,000	Craig (2), Cairns
2 February 1924	Motherwell	H	3–0	20,000	Craig (2), Cunningham
12 February 1924	Queen's Park	A	2–0	10,000	Henderson (2)
19 February 1924	Kilmarnock	H	2–0	10,000	Henderson (2)
26 February 1924	Clydebank	H	3–0	6,000	Craig (3)
5 March 1924	Kilmarnock	A	1–1	10,000	Archibald
11 March 1924	Hearts	H	1–0	6,000	Henderson
19 March 1924	Aberdeen	A	0–1	16,000	
22 March 1924	Third Lanark	A	3–1	10,000	Cunningham, Henderson, Cairns
29 March 1924	Raith Rovers	H	0–1	10,000	
5 April 1924	Hibernian	H	2–1	12,000	Meiklejohn (pen), Cunningham
12 April 1924	Morton	H	2–1	8,000	Craig, Cairns
18 April 1924	Clyde	A	1–3	10,000	Craig
26 April 1924	Airdrieonians	A	0–0	8,000	

=== Scottish Cup ===
Date	Round	Opponent	Venue	Result	Attendance	Scorers
26 January 1924	R1	Lochgelly United	H	4-1	6,000	Henderson (3), Craig
9 February 1924	R2	St Mirren	A	1-0	40,291	Henderson
23 February 1924	R3	Hibernian	H	1-2	54,000	Meiklejohn

== Appearances ==
Player	Position	Appearances	Goals
(Scotland) William Robb	GK	41	0
(Ireland) Bert Manderson	DF	34	0
(Ireland) Billy McCandless	DF	36	0
(Scotland) David Meiklejohn	DF	38	7
(England) Arthur Dixon	DF	40	0
(Scotland) Tommy Muirhead	MF	30	2
(Scotland) Sandy Archibald	MF	37	4
(Scotland) Andy Cunningham	MF	31	13
(Scotland) Geordie Henderson	FW	33	23
(Scotland) Tommy Cairns	FW	34	10
(Scotland) Alan Morton	MF	37	6
(Scotland) Alexander Johnstone	DF	12	0
(Scotland) Thomas Reid	DF	11	0
(Scotland) Tully Craig	MF	20	13
(Scotland) James Walls	MF	1	0
(Scotland) Hector Lawson	MF	2	0
(Scotland) John Nicholson	MF	3	0
(Denmark) Carl Hansen	FW	2	0
(Scotland) Alexander Kirkwood	DF	3	0
(Scotland) Murdoch McDonald	FW	1	0
(Scotland) John Jamieson	DF	1	0
(Scotland) John McGregor	MF	2	0
(Scotland) James Kilpatrick	MF	2	0

== See also ==
- 1923–24 in Scottish football
- 1923–24 Scottish Cup
