= 1921–22 Rangers F.C. season =

Rangers
1921–22 season
- Chairman: John Ure Primrose
- Manager: Bill Struth
- Ground: Ibrox Park
- Scottish League Division One: 2nd P42 W28 D10 L4 F83 A26 Pts66
- Scottish Cup: Runners-up
- Top goalscorer: League: Geordie Henderson (21); All: Geordie Henderson (27)

The 1921–22 season was the 48th season of competitive football by Rangers.

== Overview ==
Rangers played a total of 49 competitive matches during the 1921–22 season. The team finished second in the league, one point behind champions Celtic, after just winning twenty-eight of the 42 league games.

The side also reached the final of the Scottish Cup that season, beating the likes of Clachnacuddin and Partick Thistle en route to a 1–0 defeat at the hands of Greenock Morton.

== Results ==
All results are written with Rangers' score first.

=== Scottish League Division One ===
Date	Opponent	Venue	Result	Attendance	Scorers
16 August 1921	Third Lanark	A	3–1	29,000	Archibald, Cunningham, Morton
20 August 1921	Clydebank	A	7–1	22,000	Henderson (3), Cairns (2), Archibald, Morton
23 August 1921	Albion Rovers	H	3–1	31,000	Cunningham, Cairns, Henderson
27 August 1921	Motherwell	H	2–1	40,000	McDiarmid, Cunningham
3 September 1921	St Mirren	A	2–1	35,290	Cunningham, Cairns
10 September 1921	Kilmarnock	H	1–0	20,000	Cunningham
19 September 1921	Heart of Midlothian	A	2–1	22,000	McDiarmid (2)
24 September 1921	Aberdeen	H	1–0	26,000	Henderson
26 September 1921	Clyde	H	3–0	38,000	Henderson (3)
8 October 1921	Heart of Midlothian	H	0–2	40,000	
15 October 1921	Airdrieonians	A	2–1	15,000	Henderson, Cunningham
22 October 1921	Celtic	H	1–1	50,000	Henderson
29 October 1921	Queen's Park	A	4–2	32,000	Henderson (2), Morton, Cunningham
5 November 1921	Dundee	A	0–0	39,000	
12 November 1921	Dumbarton	H	1–1	16,000	Cairns
19 November 1921	Greenock Morton	A	2–1	20,000	Cunningham, Henderson
26 November 1921	Hamilton Academical	H	5–0	20,000	Archibald (2), Cunningham (2), Henderson
3 December 1921	Falkirk	A	0–1	18,000	
10 December 1921	Third Lanark	H	2–1	20,000	Cairns, Bowie
17 December 1921	Albion Rovers	A	5–0	10,000	Cairns (3), Henderson, Cunningham
24 December 1921	Hibernian	A	0–0	25,000	
26 December 1921	Dundee	H	2–1	10,000	Hansen, Cairns
31 December 1921	St Mirren	H	4–1	30,000	Henderson (2), Cunningham, Cairns
2 January 1922	Celtic	A	0–0	60,000	
3 January 1922	Partick Thistle	H	2–2	35,000	Cairns, Meiklejohn
7 January 1922	Ayr United	A	1–0	12,000	Archibald
14 January 1922	Raith Rovers	H	0–1	20,000	
21 January 1922	Hamilton Academical	A	0–0	20,000	
4 February 1922	Motherwell	A	0–2	10,000	
18 February 1922	Partick Thistle	A	1–0	53,000	Morton
21 February 1922	Clydebank	H	6–1	5,000	McDiarmid (2), Cunningham (2), Manderson, Meiklejohn
28 February 1922	Falkirk	H	0–0	18,000	
4 March 1922	Greenock Morton	H	3–0	18,000	Archibald (2), Smith
28 March 1922	Hibernian	H	2–0	13,000	Henderson, Nicholson
1 April 1922	Ayr United	H	2–0	20,000	Archibald, Hansen
3 April 1922	Raith Rovers	A	3–0	20,000	Henderson (2), Archibald
5 April 1922	Aberdeen	A	0–0	20,000	
8 April 1922	Dumbarton	A	4–0	7,000	Meiklejohn, McCandless, Henderson, McDiarmid
17 April 1922	Queen's Park	H	2–1	15,000	Hansen (2)
22 April 1922	Airdrieonians	H	3–0	18,000	Hansen (3)
24 April 1922	Kilmarnock	A	2–1	12,000	Hansen, McDiarmid
29 April 1922	Clyde	A	0–0	30,000	

=== Scottish Cup ===
Date	Round	Opponent	Venue	Result	Attendance	Scorers
28 January 1922	R1	Clachnacuddin	A	5-0	4,000	Henderson (3), McDiarmid, Morton
11 February 1922	R2	Albion Rovers	A	1-1	20,000	Archibald
15 February 1922	R2 R	Albion Rovers	H	4-0	35,000	Meiklejohn, Archibald, Morton (2)
25 February 1922	R3	Heart of Midlothian	A	4-0	40,000	Cunningham (2), Dixon, McDiarmid
11 March 1922	QF	St Mirren	H	1-1	67,700	Henderson
14 March 1922	QF R	St Mirren	A	2-0	38,027	Henderson, Cunningham
25 March 1922	SF	Partick Thistle	H	2-0	60,000	Henderson, Archibald (pen)
15 April 1922	F	Greenock Morton	N	0-1	75,000	

== Appearances ==
Player	Position	Appearances	Goals
(Scotland) William Robb	GK	50	0
(Ireland) Bert Manderson	DF	45	1
(Ireland) Billy McCandless	DF	49	1
(Scotland) David Meiklejohn	DF	40	4
(England) Arthur Dixon	DF	50	1
(Scotland) Tommy Muirhead	MF	44	0
(Scotland) Sandy Archibald	MF	48	12
(Scotland) Andy Cunningham	MF	38	17
(Scotland) Geordie Henderson	FW	35	27
(Scotland) Tommy Cairns	FW	48	12
(Scotland) Alan Morton	MF	39	7
(Scotland) James Bowie	MF	5	1
(Scotland) Bob McDermid	FW	18	9
(Scotland) John Nicholson	MF	17	1
(Scotland) Hector Lawson	MF	2	0
(Denmark) Carl Hansen	FW	11	8
(Scotland) John Jamieson	DF	7	0
(Scotland) James Smith	DF	2	1
(Scotland) Alex Laird	MF	2	0

== See also ==
- 1921–22 in Scottish football
- 1921–22 Scottish Cup
- Lord Provost's Rent Relief Cup
