= 1920–21 Rangers F.C. season =

Rangers
1920–21 season
- Chairman: John Ure Primrose
- Manager: Bill Struth
- Ground: Ibrox Park
- Scottish League Division One: 1st P42 W35 D6 L1 F91 A24 Pts76
- Scottish Cup: Runners-up
- Top goalscorer: League: Andy Cunningham (24 goals); All: Andy Cunningham (27 goals)

The 1920–21 season was the 50th season of competitive football by Rangers.

== Overview ==
Rangers played a total of 48 competitive matches during the 1920–21 season. The side was dominant, claiming victory thirty-five of the 42 league games, winning the league. They only suffered one league loss, which was a 2-0 defeat to Celtic on New Year's Day.

The side also reached the final of the Scottish Cup that season, beating the likes of Alloa Athletic and Dumbarton before a 1-0 defeat at the hands of Partick Thistle.

== Results ==
All results are written with Rangers' score first.

=== Scottish League Division One ===
Date	Opponent	Venue	Result	Attendance	Scorers
17 Aug 1920	Airdrieonians	H	4–1	12,000	Cunningham (2), Archibald, Cairns
21 Aug 1920	Motherwell	H	2–1	45,000	Walls, Cunningham
24 Aug 1920	Aberdeen	H	2–1	20,000	Cunningham, Cairns
28 Aug 1920	Kilmarnock	A	2–1	15,000	Archibald, Cunningham
01 Sep 1920	Motherwell	A	2–0	25,000	Muirhead, Cunningham
07 Sep 1920	Albion Rovers	H	2–1	12,000	Archibald, Cunningham
11 Sep 1920	Greenock Morton	H	2–0	41,000	Cunningham (2)
20 Sep 1920	Heart of Midlothian	A	4–0	30,000	Cunningham (2), Cairns, Bowie
25 Sep 1920	Aberdeen	A	1–1	21,800	Cunningham
27 Sep 1920	Hibernian	H	1–0	20,000	Cairns
02 Oct 1920	St. Mirren	H	2–0	20,000	Archibald, Cunningham
09 Oct 1920	Dumbarton	A	5–2	10,000	Cunningham (2), Meiklejohn, Cairns, Morton
16 Oct 1920	Partick Thistle	H	3–0	30,000	Archibald (2), Cunningham
23 Oct 1920	Celtic	A	2–1	65,269	Cairns, Morton
30 Oct 1920	Third Lanark	H	2–1	25,000	Cunningham, Morton
06 Nov 1920	Dundee	H	5–0	43,000	Henderson (4), Archibald
13 Nov 1920	Clydebank	A	4–2	22,000	Henderson (4)
20 Nov 1920	Hamilton Academical	H	4–0	25,000	Henderson (2), Cunningham, Bowie
27 Nov 1920	Albion Rovers	A	2–1	22,000	Cairns, Muirhead
04 Dec 1920	Queen's Park	H	3–1	30,000	Muirhead (2), Meiklejohn
11 Dec 1920	Falkirk	H	2–0	25,000	Henderson, Cunningham
18 Dec 1920	Ayr United	A	1–1	13,000	Cunningham
25 Dec 1920	Clyde	A	3–1	36,000	Walls, Cunningham, Henderson
01 Jan 1921	Celtic	H	0–2	69,260	
03 Jan 1921	Partick Thistle	A	2–0	42,000	Archibald, Cairns
08 Jan 1921	Kilmarnock	H	2–0	15,000	Henderson (2)
15 Jan 1921	Hamilton Academical	A	1–0	20,000	Morton
22 Jan 1921	Dumbarton	H	2–0	15,000	Cunningham, Cairns
29 Jan 1921	Airdrieonians	A	3–0	17,000	Archibald, Henderson, Morton
09 Feb 1921	Raith Rovers	H	1–0	15,000	Archibald
12 Feb 1921	Dundee	A	2–1	23,000	Henderson, Cairns
02 Mar 1921	Falkirk	A	2–0	9,000	Cairns, Cunningham
09 Mar 1921	Ayr United	H	7–2	8,000	Henderson (4), Archibald, Cunningham, Cairns
19 Mar 1921	Clydebank	H	1–0	15,000	Archibald
28 Mar 1921	Queen's Park	A	1–1	18,000	Dixon
02 Apr 1921	Greenock Morton	A	0–0	15,000	
09 Apr 1921	Hibernian	A	1–1	18,000	Archibald
19 Apr 1921	Clyde	H	3–1	10,000	Meiklejohn, Archibald, Henderson
21 Apr 1921	St. Mirren	A	1–0	10,000	Meiklejohn
23 Apr 1921	Third Lanark	A	1–0	30,000	Morton
27 Apr 1921	Heart of Midlothian	H	0–0	10,000	
30 Apr 1921	Raith Rovers	A	1–0	15,000	Dixon

=== Scottish Cup ===
Date	Round	Opponent	Venue	Result	Attendance	Scorers
05 Feb 1921	R2	Greenock Morton	H	2–0	67,000	Morton, Henderson
19 Feb 1921	R3	Alloa Athletic	H	0–0	60,000	
26 Feb 1921	R3 R	Alloa Athletic	H	4–1	55,000	Cairns (2), Cunningham, Archibald
05 Mar 1921	QF	Dumbarton	A	3–0	6,000	Bowie, Cunningham, Henderson
26 Mar 1921	SF	Albion Rovers	N	4–1	65,000	Cairns (2), Cunningham, Archibald
16 Apr 1921	F	Partick Thistle	N	0–1	28,294	

== Appearances ==
Player	Position	Appearances	Goals
(Scotland) William Robb	GK	48	0
(Ireland) Bert Manderson	DF	47	0
(Scotland) James Smith	DF	9	0
(Scotland) James Bowie	MF	29	3
(England) Arthur Dixon	DF	47	2
(Scotland) James Walls	MF	23	2
(Scotland) Sandy Archibald	MF	44	16
(Scotland) Tommy Muirhead	MF	19	4
(Scotland) Andy Cunningham	MF	46	27
(Scotland) Tommy Cairns	FW	44	16
(Scotland) Alan Morton	MF	45	7
(Scotland) David Meiklejohn	DF	41	4
(Scotland) Harold McKenna	DF	4	0
(Scotland) James Low	MF	3	0
(Scotland) George McQueen	DF	4	0
(Scotland) Thomas Reid	DF	3	0
(Ireland) Billy McCandless	DF	32	0
(Scotland) Geordie Henderson	FW	29	23
(Scotland) Tommy McDonald	MF	2	0
(Scotland) James Morton	DF	2	0
(Scotland) Alexander Johnstone	MF	3	0
(Scotland) Hector Lawson	MF	2	0
(Scotland) Bob McDermid	FW	2	0

== See also ==
- 1920–21 in Scottish football
- 1920–21 Scottish Cup
