= 1922–23 Rangers F.C. season =

Rangers
1922–23 season
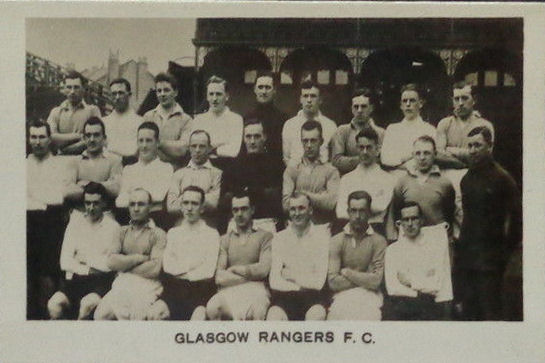
- Glasgow Rangers F.C., 1922
- Chairman: John Ure Primrose
- Manager: Bill Struth
- Ground: Ibrox Park
- Scottish League Division One: 1st P38 W23 D9 L6 F67 A29 Pts55
- Scottish Cup: Second round
- Top goalscorer: League: Geordie Henderson (23); All: Geordie Henderson (24)

The 1922–23 season was the 49th season of competitive football by Rangers.

== Overview ==
Rangers played a total of 40 competitive matches during the 1922–23 season. The team finished top of the league, five points ahead of second placed Airdrieonians, after winning twenty-three of the 38 league games and recording an unbeaten home record.

The side was knocked out of the Scottish Cup in the second round that season. After overcoming Clyde, a shock 2-0 defeat to Ayr United ended the campaign.

== Results ==
All results are written with Rangers' score first.

=== Scottish League Division One ===
Date	Opponent	Venue	Result	Attendance	Scorers
15 Aug 1922	Alloa Athletic	H	2–0	30,000	Cunningham, JR Smith
19 Aug 1922	Third Lanark	H	5–1	30,000	Hansen (2), Cunningham, Cairns, Morton
26 Aug 1922	Motherwell	A	4–0	16,000	Cunningham (2), JR Smith, Cairns
09 Sep 1922	Falkirk	A	0–2	18,000	
18 Sep 1922	Hearts	A	0–0	20,000	
23 Sep 1922	Morton	H	0–0	30,000	
25 Sep 1922	Clyde	A	2–1	31,000	Muirhead, Cairns
07 Oct 1922	Hibernian	H	2–0	22,000	Cunningham, Henderson
14 Oct 1922	Aberdeen	A	0–0	26,294	
21 Oct 1922	Albion Rovers	H	2–2	18,000	Dixon, Henderson
28 Oct 1922	Celtic	A	3–1	55,000	Cunningham (2), Henderson
04 Nov 1922	Partick Thistle	H	4–1	30,000	Henderson (2), Muirhead, Cunningham
11 Nov 1922	Hamilton	A	3–0	10,000	Henderson (2), Cairns
18 Nov 1922	Raith Rovers	H	1–0	18,000	Johnston
25 Nov 1922	St Mirren	A	0–1	30,000	
02 Dec 1922	Airdrieonians	H	4–1	30,000	Henderson (3), Archibald
09 Dec 1922	Dundee	H	4–1	35,000	Henderson (2), Muirhead, Archibald
16 Dec 1922	Ayr United	A	1–1	10,000	Henderson
23 Dec 1922	Alloa Athletic	A	2–0	8,000	Henderson, Morton
30 Dec 1922	Aberdeen	H	1–1	22,000	Cunningham
01 Jan 1923	Celtic	H	2–0	50,000	Hansen, Archibald
02 Jan 1923	Partick Thistle	A	1–0	36,000	Archibald
06 Jan 1923	Motherwell	H	2–1	35,000	Meiklejohn, Cairns
20 Jan 1923	Kilmarnock	A	2–1	16,000	Henderson, Cairns
03 Feb 1923	Hamilton	H	3–0	13,000	Hansen (2), Cunningham
06 Feb 1923	Third Lanark	A	2–2	10,000	Muirhead, Hansen
10 Feb 1923	Airdrieonians	A	0–1	12,000	
24 Feb 1923	Morton	A	1–1	16,000	Dixon
03 Mar 1923	Clyde	H	2–1	15,000	Henderson (2)
10 Mar 1923	Raith Rovers	A	0–2	10,000	
14 Mar 1923	Ayr United	H	2–1	8,000	Henderson (2)
24 Mar 1923	Dundee	A	2–1	20,000	Henderson, Cairns
27 Mar 1923	Falkrik	H	2–0	15,000	Cunningham (pen), Henderson
31 Mar 1923	Albion Rovers	A	1–2	10,000	Cairns
02 Apr 1923	St Mirren	H	1–1	10,000	Morton
07 Apr 1923	Hibernian	A	0–2	16,000	
21 Apr 1923	Kilmarnock	H	1–0	16,000	Henderson
28 Apr 1923	Hearts	H	3–0	8,000	Cairns (2), Henderson

=== Scottish Cup ===
Date	Round	Opponent	Venue	Result	Attendance	Scorers
13 Jan 1923	R1	Clyde	A	4-0	40,000	Cunningham (2), Henderson, Morton
27 Jan 1923	R2	Ayr United	A	0-2	16,000	

== Appearances ==
Player	Position	Appearances	Goals
(Scotland) William Robb	GK	40	0
(Ireland) Bert Manderson	DF	29	0
(Ireland) Billy McCandless	DF	24	0
(Scotland) David Meiklejohn	DF	36	1
(England) Arthur Dixon	DF	36	2
(Scotland) Tommy Muirhead	MF	33	4
(Scotland) Sandy Archibald	MF	36	4
(Scotland) Andy Cunningham	MF	37	13
(Scotland) Jack Smith	FW	3	2
(Scotland) Tommy Cairns	FW	38	10
(Scotland) Alan Morton	MF	37	4
(Denmark) Carl Hansen	FW	10	6
(Scotland) Geordie Henderson	FW	30	24
(Scotland) John Nicholson	MF	10	0
(Scotland) Alexander Johnstone	MF	9	1
(Scotland) Hector Lawson	MF	3	0
(Scotland) Thomas Reid	DF	14	0
(Scotland) John Jamieson	DF	13	0
(Scotland) James Walls	MF	1	0
(Scotland) James Kilpatrick	MF	1	0

== See also ==
- 1922–23 in Scottish football
- 1922–23 Scottish Cup
