= 1924–25 Rangers F.C. season =

Rangers
1924–25 season
- Chairman: Joseph Buchanan
- Manager: Bill Struth
- Ground: Ibrox Park
- Scottish League Division One: 1st P38 W25 D10 L3 F76 A26 Pts60
- Scottish Cup: Semi-finals
- Top goalscorer: League: Geordie Henderson (27); All: Geordie Henderson (32)

The 1924–25 season was the 51st season of competitive football by Rangers.

== Overview ==
Rangers played a total of 43 competitive matches during the 1924–25 season. The team finished top of the league, three points ahead of second placed Airdrieonians, after winning twenty-five of the 38 league games and recording an unbeaten home record.

The side was knocked out of the Scottish Cup at the semi-final stage that season. After overcoming East Fife, Montrose, Arbroath and Kilmarnock, a 5–0 defeat to Celtic ended the campaign.

== Results ==
All results are written with Rangers' score first.

=== Scottish League Division One ===
Date	Opponent	Venue	Result	Attendance	Scorers
16 Aug 1924	Raith Rovers	A	3–0	15,000	Henderson (3)
20 Aug 1924	St Johnstone	H	3–1	30,000	Morton (2), Henderson
23 Aug 1924	Aberdeen	A	1–0	23,000	Meiklejohn
26 Aug 1924	Queen's Park	A	3–1	30,000	Cunningham (2), Archibald
30 Aug 1924	Kilmarnock	H	1–1	18,000	Henderson
13 Sep 1924	Ayr United	A	4–0	20,000	McCandless (pen), Archibald, Cairns, Morton
15 Sep 1924	Heart of Midlothian	A	2–1	22,000	Henderson, Morton
27 Sep 1924	Airdrieonians	A	0–1	27,000	
29 Sep 1924	Heart of Midlothian	H	4–1	12,000	Cairns (2), Meiklejohn, Archibald
11 Oct 1924	Cowdenbeath	A	2–2	20,000	Cunningham (2)
18 Oct 1924	Falkirk	H	3–1	10,000	Henderson (2), Archibald
25 Oct 1924	Celtic	A	1–0	40,000	Morton
01 Nov 1924	Partick Thistle	H	4–0	25,000	Craig, Cunningham, Henderson, Chalmers
08 Nov 1924	Third Lanark	A	1–1	23,000	Craig
15 Nov 1924	Hibernian	H	3–0	30,000	Meiklejohn, Cunningham (pen), Henderson
22 Nov 1924	St Johnstone	A	3–1	10,000	Henderson (2), Morton
29 Nov 1924	St Mirren	H	3–1	26,000	Cairns (2), Archibald
06 Dec 1924	Dundee	A	0–0	20,000	
13 Dec 1924	Hamilton Academical	H	2–0	10,000	Henderson (2)
20 Dec 1924	St Mirren	A	4–1	20,000	Henderson (3), Archibald
27 Dec 1924	Motherwell	H	1–0	15,000	Henderson
01 Jan 1925	Celtic	H	4–1	34,000	Henderson (2), Cunningham, McCandless (pen)
03 Jan 1925	Greenock Morton	H	2–0	17,000	Cairns, Morton
05 Jan 1925	Partick Thistle	A	1–0	25,000	Henderson
10 Jan 1925	Morton	A	1–1	10,000	Morton
17 Jan 1925	Queen's Park	H	1–1	20,000	Cairns
31 Jan 1925	Hamilton Academical	A	0–1	15,000	
10 Feb 1925	Dundee	H	2–0	5,000	McCandless (pen), Chalmers
18 Feb 1925	Falkirk	A	1–1	12,000	Henderson
25 Feb 1925	Airdrieonians	H	1–1	40,000	Archibald
11 Mar 1925	Hibernian	A	1–4	23,000	Dick
25 Mar 1925	Raith Rovers	A	4–0	10,000	Henderson (3), Archibald
28 Mar 1925	Kilmarnock	A	0–0	12,000	
01 Apr 1925	Cowdenbeath	H	1–0	5,000	McCandless (pen)
07 Apr 1925	Aberdeen	H	2–0	8,000	Cairns (2)
11 Apr 1925	Third Lanark	H	5–2	12,000	Henderson (2), Cairns (2), Archibald
18 Apr 1925	Motherwell	A	1–1	7,000	Archibald
25 Apr 1925	Ayr United	H	1–0	10,000	McCandless

=== Scottish Cup ===
Date	Round	Opponent	Venue	Result	Attendance	Scorers
24 Jan 1925	R1	East Fife	A	3–1	10,000	Archibald (2), Henderson
07 Feb 1925	R2	Montrose	A	2–0	4,000	Chalmers (2)
21 Feb 1925	R3	Arbroath	H	5–3	4,000	Cairns, Henderson (3), Cunningham
07 Mar 1925	QF	Kilmarnock	A	2–1	31,502	Henderson, Cunningham
21 Mar 1925	SF	Celtic	N	0–5	101,714	

== Appearances ==
Player	Position	Appearances	Goals
(Scotland) William Robb	GK	43	0
(Ireland) Bert Manderson	DF	39	0
(Ireland) Billy McCandless	DF	37	5
(Scotland) David Meiklejohn	DF	40	3
(England) Arthur Dixon	DF	41	0
(Scotland) Tully Craig	MF	22	2
(Scotland) Sandy Archibald	MF	43	12
(Scotland) Andy Cunningham	MF	36	9
(Scotland) Geordie Henderson	FW	42	32
(Scotland) Tommy Cairns	FW	36	12
(Scotland) Alan Morton	MF	41	8
(Scotland) Thomas Reid	DF	3	0
(Scotland) Andrew Kirkwood	DF	5	0
(Scotland) John Jamieson	DF	7	0
(Scotland) Billy Chalmers	FW	14	4
(Scotland) John McGregor	MF	1	0
(Scotland) Robert Ireland	DF	6	0
(Scotland) Archie Morton	MF	1	0
(Scotland) Tommy Muirhead	MF	15	0
(Scotland) Alexander Dick	FW	1	1

== See also ==
- 1924–25 in Scottish football
- 1924–25 Scottish Cup
