= 1919–20 Rangers F.C. season =

Rangers
1919–20 season
- Chairman: John Ure Primrose
- Manager: William Wilton
- Ground: Ibrox Park
- Scottish League: 1st P42 W31 D9 L2 F106 A25 Pts71
- Scottish Cup: Semi-finals
- Top goalscorer: League: Andy Cunningham (23); All: Andy Cunningham (25)

The 1919–20 season was the 46th season of competitive football by Rangers.

== Overview ==
Rangers played a total of 50 competitive matches during the 1919–20 season. This was the first full season since the end of the First World War and clubs who were asked to retire for geographical reasons during the war returned along with the Scottish Cup, which had been withdrawn.

The team won the league championship with thirty-one wins from there forty-two matches, however the Scottish Cup campaign was ended at the hands of Albion Rovers. It took a second replay to separate the sides and a 2–0 win for Rovers saw them go through to the 1920 Scottish Cup Final.

== Results ==
All results are written with Rangers' score first.

=== Scottish League Division One ===
Date	Opponent	Venue	Result	Attendance	Scorers
16 August 1919	Airdrieonians	A	1–0	12,000	Bowie
23 August 1919	Aberdeen	H	3–2	22,000	Cunningham (2), Reid
26 August 1919	Albion Rovers	H	3–0	10,000	Reid (2), Bowie
30 August 1919	St Mirren	A	4–0	20,000	Bowie (2), Muirheard, Cairns
9 September 1919	Raith Rovers	H	3–2	12,000	Archibald, Cunningham, Patterson
13 September 1919	Clyde	A	0–0	12,000	
15 September 1919	Kilmarnock	A	7–1	15,000	Gordon (2) Cunningham (2), Paterson, Bowie, Cairns
20 September 1919	Dumbarton	H	4–0	10,000	Gordon (3), Muirhead
27 September 1919	Motherwell	A	0–1	20,000	
29 September 1919	Heart of Midlothian	H	3–0	40,000	Reid (2), Archibald
4 October 1919	Kilmarnock	H	5–0	15,000	Reid (2), Paterson, Archibald, Bowie
11 October 1919	Raith Rovers	A	2–1	15,000	Gordon, Archibald
18 October 1919	Celtic	H	3–0	76,000	Cunningham (2), Paterson
25 October 1919	Dundee	A	2–0	30,000	Cunningham (2)
1 November 1919	Third Lanark	H	6–1	12,000	Cunningham (3), Paterson, Cairns, Mccormack (og)
8 November 1919	Partick Thistle	A	2–1	45,000	Cunningham, Cairns
22 November 1919	Queen's Park	A	0–0	45,000	
29 November 1919	Albion Rovers	A	4–0	16,000	Cunningham (2), Cairns, Bowie
6 December 1919	Hibernian	H	7–0	14,000	Cunningham (4), Muirhead, Archibald, Cairns
13 December 1919	Clydebank	A	0–0	20,000	
20 December 1919	Hamilton Academical	H	4–1	14,000	Cunningham (2), Archibald, Muirhead
27 December 1919	Ayr United	A	3–0	10,000	Bowie, Muirhead, Cairns
1 January 1920	Celtic	A	1–1	80,000	Muirhead
3 January 1920	Falkirk	H	3–1	25,000	Cairns (2), Gordon (pen)
5 January 1920	Partick Thistle	H	2–2	15,000	Muirhead, Paterson
10 January 1920	Hamilton Academical	A	2–1	10,000	Bowie, Cairns
17 January 1920	St Mirren	H	3–1	10,000	Archibald (2) Paterson
31 January 1920	Falkirk	A	3–0	12,000	Paterson, Archibald, Gordon
14 February 1920	Greenock Morton	A	2–0	35,000	Reid, Muirhead
28 February 1920	Clyde	H	1–0	15,000	Walls
16 March 1920	Motherwell	H	0–0	20,000	
20 March 1920	Aberdeen	A	2–0	24,000	Paterson, Walls
3 April 1920	Airdrieonians	H	3–2	25,000	Cairns (2), Henderson
5 April 1920	Clydebank	H	1–2	25,000	Muirhead
10 April 1920	Heart of Midlothian	A	0–0	24,000	
13 April 1920	Ayr United	H	2–1	15,000	Cunningham, McDonald
17 April 1920	Queen's Park	H	3–1	15,000	Cunningham, Henderson, Muirhead
21 April 1920	Hibernian	A	1–1	12,000	Meiklejohn
24 April 1920	Dundee	H	6–1	25,000	Gordon (2), Bowie (2), Cairns, Paterson
27 April 1920	Third Lanark	A	2–0	35,000	Meiklejohn, Bowie
28 April 1920	Dumbarton	A	0–0	6,000	
1 May 1920	Greenock Morton	H	3–1	30,000	Archibald (2), Paterson

=== Scottish Cup ===
Date	Round	Opponent	Venue	Result	Attendance	Scorers
24 January 1920	R1	Dumbarton	H	0–0	28,000	
27 January 1920	R1 R	Dumbarton	H	1–0	28,000	Cairns
7 February 1920	R2	Arbroath	H	5–0	25,000	Muirhead (2), Archibald, Bowie, Cunningham
21 February 1920	R3	Broxburn United	H	3–0	16,000	Muirhead, Cunningham, Dixon
6 March 1920	QF	Celtic	H	1–0	85,000	Muirhead
27 March 1920	SF	Albion Rovers	N	1–1	32,000	Paterson
31 March 1920	SF R	Albion Rovers	N	0–0	40,000	
7 April 1920	SF 2R	Albion Rovers	N	0–2	65,000	

== Appearances ==
Player	Position	Appearances	Goals
(England) Herbert Lock	GK	43	0
(Ireland) Bert Manderson	DF	48	0
(England) Arthur Dixon	DF	36	1
(Scotland) James Walls	MF	47	2
(Scotland) Andy Cunnnigham	MF	45	25
(Scotland) James Bowie	MF	47	13
(Scotland) Sandy Archibald	MF	45	12
(Scotland) Jimmy Paterson	MF	44	12
(Scotland) Tommy Cairns	FW	43	14
(Scotland) Tommy Muirhead	MF	40	14
(Scotland) Jimmy Gordon	DF	40	10
(Scotland) Archie Ritchie	DF	26	0
(Scotland) David Meiklejohn	DF	11	2
(Scotland) Willie Reid	FW	9	8
(Scotland) William Robb	GK	7	0
(Scotland) James Smith	DF	6	0
(Scotland) Geordie Henderson	FW	7	2
(Scotland) Thomas McDonald	MF	3	1
(Scotland) James Low	MF	1	0
(Scotland) Alexander Johnstone	MF	1	0

== See also ==
- 1919–20 in Scottish football
- 1919–20 Scottish Cup
