= 1917–18 Rangers F.C. season =

Rangers
1917–18 season
- Chairman: John Ure Primrose
- Manager: William Wilton
- Ground: Ibrox Park
- Scottish League: 1st P34 W25 D6 L3 F66 A24 Pts56
- Top goalscorer: League: Jimmy Gordon, Tommy Cairns (11); All: Jimmy Gordon, Tommy Cairns (11)

The 1917–18 season was the 44th season of competitive football by Rangers.

== Overview ==
Rangers played a total of 34 competitive matches during the 1917–18 season. They finished top of the Scottish League after winning 25 of the 34 league matches and collecting a total of 56 points (one more than second placed Celtic).

The Scottish Cup was not competed for this season as the Scottish Football Association had withdrawn the tournament due to the outbreak of the First World War.

== Results ==
All results are written with Rangers' score first.

=== Scottish League Division One ===
Date	Opponent	Venue	Result	Attendance	Scorers
18 August 1917	Kilmarnock	A	1–0	10,000	McDermid
29 August 1917	Third Lanark	H	4–2	18,000	Cunningham (3, 1 pen), Cairns
1 September 1917	Partick Thistle	A	0–2	20,000	
15 September 1917	Hibernian	H	3–0	10,000	Bowie, Cairns, Gordon (o.g.)
24 September 1917	Queen's Park	H	3–0	12,000	Muirhead (2), Lawson
29 September 1917	Dumbarton	A	4–2	8,000	Cairns (2), Muirhead (2)
13 October 1917	Morton	A	1–1	10,000	Brown
20 October 1917	Celtic	H	1–2	45,000	Bowie
27 October 1917	St Mirren	A	0–0	10,00	
3 November 1917	Ayr United	H	0–0	8,000	
10 November 1917	Heart of Midlothian	A	3–0	12,000	Gordon (2), Archibald
17 November 1917	Airdrieonians	H	4–0	12,000	Brown (3), Cairns
24 November 1917	Queen's Park	A	3–2	12,000	Gordon (pen.), Archibald, Brown
1 December 1917	Dumbarton	H	2–1	7,000	Cairns (2)
8 December 1917	Hamilton Academical	A	2–1	9,000	Reid (2)
15 December 1917	Falkirk	H	4–1	8,000	Brown (2), Archibald, Bowie
22 December 1917	Third Lanark	A	1–0	12,000	Muirhead
29 December 1917	St Mirren	H	2–0	12,000	Bowie, Cairns
1 January 1918	Celtic	A	0–0	55,000	
2 January 1918	Partick Thistle	H	1–0	18,000	Blair (pen.)
5 January 1918	Clydebank	A	1–1	14,700	Archibald
12 January 1918	Heart of Midlothian	H	2–0	8,000	Gordon (2)
26 January 1918	Ayr United	A	2–0	5,000	Cairns, McDermid
2 February 1918	Morton	H	4–2	25,000	Gordon (4)
9 February 1918	Hibernian	A	1–0	8,000	McDermid
16 February 1918	Clyde	A	3–0	8,000	Brown (2), Cairns
23 February 1918	Motherwell	A	0–0	12,000	
2 March 1918	Kilmarnock	H	3–0	20,000	Archibald (2), McCulloch
9 March 1918	Falkirk	A	0–2	8,000	
16 March 1918	Hamilton Academical	H	4–2	10,000	McDermid, Hart, Archibald, Martin
23 March 1918	Airdrieonians	A	2–1	10,000	Hart, Cairns
30 March 1918	Clydebank	H	1–0	10,000	Cunningham
6 April 1918	Motherwell	H	2–1	25,000	Gordon (2)
13 April 1918	Clyde	H	2–1	10,000	Archibald, Bowie

== Appearances ==
Player	Position	Appearances	Goals
(Scotland) Sandy Archibald	MF	34	8
(Scotland) Tommy Cairns	FW	34	11
(Scotland) James Bowie	MF	33	5
(England) Arthur Dixon	DF	32	0
(Ireland) Bert Manderson	DF	29	0
(Scotland) Bob McDermid	MF	28	4
(Scotland) James Blair	DF	27	1
(Scotland) John Hempsey	GK	25	0
(Scotland) Peter Pursell	DF	24	0
(Scotland) James Martin	MF	18	1
(Scotland) Jimmy Gordon	DF	16	11
(Scotland) George McQueen	DF	12	0
(Scotland) Harold McKenna	MF	12	0
(Scotland) David Brown	FW	11	9
(Scotland) Tommy Muirhead	MF	7	5
(England) Herbert Lock	GK	7	0
(Scotland) Hector Lawson	MF	5	1
(Scotland) Andy Cunningham	MF	4	4
(Scotland) James Young	MF	4	0
(Scotland) Joseph Hart	FW	3	2
(Scotland) James Riddell	DF	2	0
(Scotland) Thomas Shingleton	GK	2	0
(Scotland) John McCulloch	FW	2	1
(Scotland) Dick Bell	MF	1	0
(Scotland) Willie Reid	FW	1	2
(Scotland) John Dick	DF	1	0

== See also ==
- 1917–18 in Scottish football
- Navy and Army War Fund Shield
