= 1918–19 Rangers F.C. season =

Rangers
1918–19 season
- Chairman: John Ure Primrose
- Manager: William Wilton
- Ground: Ibrox Park
- Scottish League: 2nd P34 W26 D5 L3 F86 A16 Pts57
- Top goalscorer: League: David McLean (29); All: David McLean (29)

The 1918–19 season was the 45th season of competitive football by Rangers.

== Overview ==
Rangers played a total of 34 competitive matches during the 1918–19 season. They finished second in the Scottish Football League after winning 26 of the 34 league matches and collecting a total of 58 points (one less than first-placed Celtic).

The Scottish Cup was not competed for this season as the Scottish Football Association had withdrawn the tournament due to the outbreak of the First World War.

== Results ==
All results are written with Rangers' score first.

=== Scottish Football League ===
| Date | Opponent | Venue | Result | Attendance | Scorers |
|---|---|---|---|---|---|
| 17 August 1918 | Falkirk | H | 1–0 | 30,000 | McLean (pen.) |
| 24 August 1918 | Heart of Midlothian | A | 4–1 | 14,500 | McLean (3), Cairns |
| 31 August 1918 | St Mirren | H | 2–0 | 12,000 | Aitken, McLean |
| 7 September 1918 | Hamilton Academical | A | 3–0 | 12,000 | McLean (2), Manderson |
| 14 September 1918 | Partick Thistle | H | 2–0 | 25,000 | McLean (2) |
| 28 September 1918 | Ayr United | H | 6–2 | 10,000 | Bowie (3), Hart (2), Cairns |
| 30 September 1918 | Queen's Park | A | 2–0 | 25,000 | Hart, Cairns |
| 12 October 1918 | Dumbarton | H | 3–0 | 12,000 | McLean (2), Aitken |
| 19 October 1918 | Celtic | A | 3–0 | 36,000 | Cairns, Bowie, McDermid |
| 26 October 1918 | Motherwell | H | 0–0 | 22,000 | |
| 2 November 1918 | Third Lanark | A | 2–1 | 25,000 | Bowie, McLean |
| 9 November 1918 | Clyde | H | 3–0 | 20,000 | Cairns (2), McLean |
| 16 November 1918 | Airdrieonians | A | 0–0 | 7,000 | |
| 23 November 1918 | Morton | A | 0–1 | 10,000 | |
| 7 December 1918 | Hibernian | H | 5–1 | 12,000 | Bowie (3), McLean, Cairns |
| 14 December 1918 | Clydebank | A | 5–0 | 20,000 | McLean (3), Cairns, Lawson |
| 21 December 1918 | Kilmarnock | H | 8–0 | 15,000 | McLean (4), Bowie (2), Cairns, Lawson |
| 28 December 1918 | Motherwell | A | 1–0 | 20,000 | Bowie |
| 1 January 1919 | Celtic | H | 1–1 | 65,000 | Bowie |
| 2 January 1919 | Partick Thistle | A | 0–1 | 30,000 | |
| 4 January 1919 | Airdrieonians | H | 2–1 | 18,000 | Blair (2, 2 pens) |
| 11 January 1919 | Kilmarnock | A | 0–1 | 10,000 | |
| 18 January 1919 | Queen's Park | H | 4–0 | 20,000 | Cairns (2), McDermid (2) |
| 25 January 1919 | Hibernian | A | 2–1 | 12,000 | Archibald, Gordon |
| 1 February 1919 | Dumbarton | A | 2–0 | 10,000 | Cairns, McLean |
| 8 February 1919 | Morton | H | 1–0 | 40,000 | McLean |
| 15 February 1919 | St Mirren | A | 2–2 | 15,000 | Cairns, Manderson |
| 22 February 1919 | Clydebank | H | 3–0 | 14,000 | Brown (3) |
| 1 March 1919 | Heart of Midlothian | H | 3–2 | 35,000 | Brown, Archibald, Cunningham |
| 8 March 1919 | Hamilton Academical | H | 3–0 | 15,000 | Archibald, Brown, Dixon |
| 22 March 1919 | Ayr United | A | 1–1 | 12,000 | Blair (pen.) |
| 12 April 1919 | Falkirk | A | 4–0 | 12,000 | Gordon (2), McLean, Bowie |
| 21 April 1919 | Third Lanark | H | 4–0 | 15,000 | McLean (2), Dixon, Gordon |
| 10 May 1919 | Clyde | A | 4–0 | 35,000 | McLean (3), Bowie |

== Appearances ==
| Player | Position | Appearances | Goals |
|---|---|---|---|
| (Scotland) John Hempsey | GK | 29 | 0 |
| (Ireland) Bert Manderson | DF | 30 | 2 |
| (Scotland) Jimmy Blair | DF | 29 | 3 |
| (Scotland) Peter Pursell | DF | 23 | 0 |
| (England) Arthur Dixon | DF | 34 | 2 |
| (Scotland) James Walls | MF | 34 | 0 |
| (Scotland) William Aitken | MF | 21 | 2 |
| (Scotland) James Bowie | MF | 26 | 14 |
| (Scotland) David McLean | FW | 24 | 29 |
| (Scotland) Tommy Cairns | FW | 28 | 11 |
| (Scotland) Bob McDermid | MF | 7 | 1 |
| (Scotland) Andy Cunnnigham | MF | 15 | 4 |
| (Scotland) Jimmy Gordon | DF | 16 | 5 |
| (Scotland) Sandy Archibald | MF | 15 | 3 |
| (Scotland) George McQueen | DF | 7 | 0 |
| (Scotland) Joseph Hart | FW | 3 | 3 |
| (Scotland) Hector Lawson | MF | 9 | 2 |
| (Scotland) James Riddell | DF | 4 | 0 |
| (Scotland) David Brown | FW | 9 | 5 |
| (England) Herbert Lock | GK | 4 | 0 |
| (Scotland) Scott Duncan | MF | 1 | 0 |
| (Scotland) Joe Donnachie | MF | 5 | 0 |
| (Scotland) John Miller | GK | 1 | 0 |

== See also ==
- 1919 Victory Cup
- 1918–19 in Scottish football
