= 1921–22 British Home Championship =

Tournament details
- Host country: England, Ireland, Scotland and Wales
- Dates: 23 October 1921 – 11 April 1922
- Teams: 4

Final positions
- Champions: Scotland (18th title)
- Runners-up: England; Wales (shared)

Tournament statistics
- Matches played: 6
- Goals scored: 12 (2 per match)
- Top scorer(s): (Scotland) Andrew Wilson (Ireland) Billy Gillespie (3 goals)

The 1921–22 British Home Championship was an international football tournament played during the 1921–22 season between the British Home Nations. Scotland were victorious as part of a string of seven victories during the 1920s. England and Wales came joint second with Ireland coming last.

The competition began with Wales, the other strong side of the decade, gaining an immediate advantage, capitalising on a weak draw between England and Ireland to take two points from Scotland at home. This momentum was not sustained however, and Scotland bounced back to beat Ireland as Wales lost 1–0 to England in Liverpool. In the final matches all four teams could still claim victory, but a tame draw between Wales and Ireland left the deciding game between England and Scotland. Despite a strong performance from England, the Scots proved the better side, running out 1–0 winners to claim the title. By virtue of their draws with Ireland, England and Wales were equal on points in second places whilst the same draws gave Ireland their only points of the competition.

== Table ==
Team	Pld	W	D	L	GF	GA	GD	Pts
Scotland (C)	3	2	0	1	4	3	+1	4
England	3	1	1	1	2	2	0	3
Wales	3	1	1	1	3	3	0	3
Ireland	3	0	2	1	3	4	−1	2

Rules for classification: 1) points. The points system worked as follows: 2 points for a win and 1 point for a draw.
(C) Champions

== Results ==
22 October 1921

Ireland	1–1	England
Gillespie 28'		Kirton 33'

Windsor Park, Belfast
Attendance: 30,000
Referee: Alex Jackson (Scotland)

4 February 1922

Wales	2–1	Scotland
L. Davies 7'; S. Davies 25'		Archibald 66'

Racecourse Ground, Wrexham
Attendance: 10,000
Referee: Arthur Ward (England)

4 March 1922

Scotland	2–1	Ireland
Wilson 61', 83'		Gillespie 43'

Celtic Park, Glasgow
Attendance: 40,000
Referee: Arthur Ward (England)

13 March 1922

England	1–0	Wales
Kelly 3'

Anfield, Liverpool
Attendance: 35,000
Referee: Joe Forshaw (England)

1 April 1922

Ireland	1–1	Wales
Gillespie 7'		L. Davies 87'

Windsor Park, Belfast
Attendance: 20,000
Referee: Arthur Ward (England)

8 April 1922

England	0–1	Scotland
		Wilson 62'

Villa Park, Birmingham
Attendance: 33,646
Referee: Thomas R. Dougray (Scotland)

== Winning squad ==
- Scotland

Name	Apps/Goals by opponent			Total	
Name	(Wales) WAL	(Ireland) IRE	(England) ENG	Apps	Goals
Andy Wilson	1	1/2	1/1	3	3
Kenny Campbell	1	1	1	3	0
Jack Marshall	1	1	1	3	0
Sandy Archibald	1/1		1	2	1
Willie Cringan		1	1	2	0
Alan Morton	1		1	2	0
Donald McKinlay	1	1		2	0
Jimmy Blair			1	1	0
Tommy Cairns			1	1	0
Johnny Crosbie			1	1	0
John Gilchrist			1	1	0
Neil McBain			1	1	0
Alex Donaldson		1		1	0
James Hogg		1		1	0
Jimmy Kinloch		1		1	0
Tommy Muirhead		1		1	0
Andy Cunningham		1		1	0
Alex Troup		1		1	0
William Collier	1			1	0
Michael Gilhooley	1			1	0
Davie Meiklejohn	1			1	0
Frank Walker	1			1	0
Jock White	1			1	0
