= 1928–29 Scottish Cup =

Tournament details
- Country: Scotland

Final positions
- Champions: Kilmarnock
- Runners-up: Rangers

The 1928–29 Scottish Cup was the 51st staging of Scotland's most prestigious football knockout competition. The Cup was won by Kilmarnock who defeated Rangers in the final.

== Fourth round ==
Team One	Team Two	Score
Celtic	Motherwell	0-0 2-1
Raith Rovers	Kilmarnock	2-3
Rangers	Dundee United	3-1
St Mirren	Aberdeen	4-3

== Semi-finals ==
23 March 1929

Kilmarnock	1–0	Celtic
Jimmy Weir

Attendance: 40,000

23 March 1929

Rangers	3–2	St Mirren
Tommy Muirhead; Sandy Archibald; Alan Morton

Hampden Park, Glasgow
Attendance: 69,727

== Final ==
6 April 1929

Kilmarnock	2–0	Rangers
Aitken; Williamson

Hampden Park, Glasgow
Attendance: 114,780

=== Teams ===
Kilmarnock:
GK	Sam Clemie
RB	Tom Robertson
LB	Joe Nibloe
RH	Hugh Morton
CH	Hugh McLaren
LH	Jock McEwan
OR	Willie Connell
IR	Mattha Smith
CF	Peerie Cunningham
IL	Jimmy Williamson
OL	Jock Aitken

Rangers:
GK	Tom Hamilton
RB	Dougie Gray
LB	Bob Hamilton
RH	Jock Buchanan
CH	Davie Meiklejohn
LH	Tully Craig
OR	Sandy Archibald
IR	Tommy Muirhead
CF	Jimmy Fleming
IL	Bob McPhail
OL	Alan Morton

== See also ==
- 1928–29 in Scottish football
- 1932 Scottish Cup Final – played between the same teams
