= Lord Provost's Rent Relief Cup =

The Lord Provost's Rent Relief Cup comprised two separate football tournaments played in aid of the Lord Provost's Rent Relief Fund in 1921. Held in Edinburgh and Glasgow, both were one-off competitions. Various other tournaments and events were held to help the unemployed in 1921.

== Glasgow ==
The six member clubs (Celtic, Clyde, Queen's Park, Partick Thistle, Rangers, and Third Lanark) of both the Glasgow FA and the Scottish Football League competed in the Glasgow tournament. All six teams were used to playing against each other in city knockout competitions, with both the Glasgow Cup and Glasgow Charity Cup held on an annual basis. The tournament was completed in a month.

=== Tournament ===
First round

13 November 1921

| Partick Thistle | 4 – 2 | Clyde |
|---|---|---|
| Bowie; McColl | Report | McClure; Rae |

Firhill Stadium, Glasgow
Attendance: 5,000
Referee: J. M. Dickson

22 November 1921

| Queen's Park | 2 – 3 | Rangers |
|---|---|---|
| Fyfe 15'; Grove 65' | Report | Hansen 5' (pen.) |

Hampden Park, Glasgow
Attendance: 6,000
Referee: T. McMillan

Semi-finals

29 November 1921

| Celtic | 2 – 1 | Third Lanark |
|---|---|---|
| McInally 15' 40' | Report | Paterson 20' |

Celtic Park, Glasgow
Attendance: 5,000
Referee: A. A. Jackson

6 December 1921

| Rangers | 2 – 0 | Partick Thistle |
|---|---|---|
| Henderson 6'; Hansen 16' | Report |

Ibrox Stadium, Glasgow
Attendance: 9,000
Referee: A. Allan

Final

13 December 1921
13:00

| Rangers | 2 – 0 | Celtic |
|---|---|---|
| Hansen (pen.); Cairns 85' | Report |

Hampden Park, Glasgow
Attendance: 25,000
Referee: J. M. Dickson

== Edinburgh ==
The four member clubs (Heart of Midlothian, Hibernian, Leith Athletic, and St Bernard's) of both the Edinburgh FA and the Scottish Football League decided to compete in a one-off tournament. The final of the Edinburgh tournament was delayed by almost two years due to continuous postponements.

=== Tournament ===
Semi-finals

7 December 1921

| Heart of Midlothian | 2 – 1 | St Bernard's |
|---|---|---|
| Tait 20'; Preston | Report | Donachie 80' |

Tynecastle Park, Edinburgh

14 December 1921

| Hibernian | 7 – 0 | Leith Athletic |

Easter Road, Edinburgh

Final

15 May 1923

| Heart of Midlothian | 2 – 1 | Hibernian |
|---|---|---|
| Jo. White 43' 67' (pen.) | Report | Dunn |

Tynecastle Park, Edinburgh
Attendance: 5000

== See also ==
- Glasgow Dental Hospital Cup
