= 1927–28 Scottish Cup =

Tournament details
- Country: Scotland

Final positions
- Champions: Rangers
- Runners-up: Celtic

The 1927–28 Scottish Cup was the 50th staging of Scotland's most prestigious football knockout competition. The Cup was won by Rangers who defeated Celtic 4–0 in an Old Firm final; it was their first victory in the competition for 25 years – the last had been in 1903, with four defeats in finals since then.

== First round ==
All matches were played on 21 January 1928 with the exception of the Dumbarton/Hamilton Academical match which was postponed due to a waterlogged pitch and played four days later.

Home team	Score	Away team
Albion Rovers	5 – 1	Glasgow University
Alloa	2 – 0	Fraserburgh
Arbroath	2 – 3	Nithsdale Wanderers
Armadale	3 – 1	Berwick Rangers
Ayr United	2 – 0	Bo'ness
Beith	1 – 4	Airdrieonians
Brechin City	3 – 1	Lochgelly United
Celtic	3 – 1	Bathgate
Civil Service Strollers	0 – 3	King's Park
Clydebank	0 – 3	Dunfermline Athletic
Cowdenbeath	12 – 0	Johnstone
Dumbarton	2 – 3	Hamilton Academical
East Fife	1 – 1	Dundee United
East Stirlingshire	0 – 6	Rangers
Falkirk	3 – 1	St. Bernard's
Forfar Athletic	2 – 1	Queen of the South
Forres Mechanics	2 – 1	Elgin City
Hearts	2 – 2	St. Johnstone
Hibernian	w/o	Dykehead
Huntly	0 – 3	Motherwell
Keith	5 – 2	Dalbeattie Star
Leith Athletic	2 – 3	Kilmarnock
Montrose	0 – 5	Stenhousemuir
Greenock Morton	7 – 3	Mid-Annandale
Partick Thistle	9 – 1	Caledonian
Queen's Park	2 – 0	Arthurlie
Raith Rovers	4 – 3	Aberdeen
St. Mirren	6 – 1	Clyde
Stranraer	2 – 4	Dundee
Third Lanark	10 – 0	Clackmannan
Vale of Atholl	2 – 1	Newton Stewart
Vale of Leven	1 – 2	Leith Amateurs

Replays

The replays were played on 25 January 1928.

Home team	Score	Away team
Dundee United	2 – 1	East Fife
Hearts	1 – 0 (a.e.t)	St. Johnstone

== Second round ==
The matches were played on 4 February 1928. All remaining non-league teams were knocked out.

4 February 1928	Airdrieonians	2–1	Hamilton Academical	Airdrie
	Muir 34'; Murdoch 59'	Report	Moffat 18'	Stadium: Broomfield Park; Attendance: 6,000; Referee: C. Bilney

4 February 1928	Armadale	2–4	King's Park	Armadale
	Duff; Grove	Report	Ferguson; Rae (pen.); Baird; Toner	Attendance: 2,500 (estimated); Referee: A.B. Williamson

4 February 1928	Ayr United	2–4	Falkirk	Ayr
	Paterson 8'; McColgan	Report	Nisbet 12'; Morrison; Hutchison 53'	Stadium: Somerset Park; Attendance: 16,000 (estimated); Referee: J.P. Rowe

4 February 1928	Brechin City	1–4	Albion Rovers	Brechin
	Ramsay	Report	Brunt; Rae; Marshall	Stadium: Glebe Park; Attendance: 1,300 (estimated); Referee: C. Ritchie

4 February 1928	Dundee United	3–3	Dundee	Dundee
	Jacky Kay; Hutchison	Report	Lawley; Whitlow	Stadium: Tannadice Park; Attendance: 20,360 (estimated); Referee: W Bell

4 February 1928	Dunfermline Athletic	3–1	Leith Amateurs	Dunfermline
	Williamson; T.W. Dickson; J Dickson	Report	Crighton	Stadium: East End Park; Attendance: 1,300 (estimated); Referee: W.G. Holburn

4 February 1928	Forfar Athletic	1–2	Kilmarnock	Forfar
	Webb 5'	Report	Murphy; Cunningham 47'	Attendance: 3,000 (estimated); Referee: A Allan

4 February 1928	Hearts	7–0	Forres Mechanics	Edinburgh
	Devlin; Miller; McMillan; Rogers	Report		Stadium: Tynecastle; Attendance: 17,000 (estimated); Referee: C.S McDonald

4 February 1928	Keith	1–6	Celtic	Keith
	Duncan	Report	McGrory; McInally	Stadium: Kynoch Park; Attendance: 5,800 (estimated); Referee: J.M. Russell

4 February 1928	Motherwell	2–2	Raith Rovers	Motherwell
	Stevenson; Cameron 42'	Report	Johnman (o.g.) 58'; Ritchie 78'	Stadium: Fir Park; Attendance: 5,000 (estimated); Referee: T Small

4 February 1928	Partick Thistle	4–0	Nithsdale Wanderers	Glasgow
	Ness; McDougall	Report		Stadium: Firhill; Attendance: 5,000 (estimated); Referee: A Scott

4 February 1928	Queen's Park	4–1	Greenock Morton	Glasgow
	McLelland; McAlpine	Report	Osborne	Stadium: Hampden; Attendance: 9,?00 (estimated); Referee: J Archer

4 February 1928	Rangers	4–2	Cowdenbeath	Glasgow
	McPhail; Fleming	Report	Rankin; Lindsay	Stadium: Ibrox; Referee: T Dougray

4 February 1928	Stenhousemuir	1–2	Alloa	Stenhousemuir
	Reid 75'	Report	O'Shea; Wilson	Stadium: Ochilview; Attendance: 2,500 (estimated); Referee: R Innes

4 February 1928	St. Mirren	5–1	Vale of Atholl	Paisley
	Wills (o.g.); McCrae; Rankin	Report	Kirk	Stadium: St Mirren Park; Attendance: 3,000 (estimated); Referee: R Morrison

4 February 1928	Third Lanark	0–2	Hibernian	Glasgow
	Ritchie; Dunn 80'	Report		Stadium: Cathkin Park; Attendance: 7,000 (estimated); Referee: A Leishman

Replays

The matches were played on 8 February 1928.

8 February 1928	Raith Rovers	1–2	Motherwell	Kirkcaldy
	Allison 55'	Report	Cameron; Keenan	Stadium: Stark's Park; Attendance: 8,000 (estimated); Referee: T Small

8 February 1928	Dundee	1–0	Dundee United	Dundee
	O'Hare 14'	Report		Stadium: Dens Park; Attendance: 13,000 (estimated); Referee: W Bell

== Third round ==
The ties were drawn on 8 February 1928 and played on 18 February 1928.

18 February 1928	Hibernian	0–0	Falkirk	Edinburgh
		Report		Stadium: Easter Road; Attendance: 18,000; Referee: T Dougary

18 February 1928	St. Mirren	0–5	Partick Thistle	Paisley
		Report	Gibson 16'; McDougall 18'	Stadium: St Mirren Park; Attendance: 26,100; Referee: A.H. Leishman

18 February 1928	Albion Rovers	3–1	Airdrieonians	Coatbridge
	Marshall; Brant; Creighton	Report	Somerville 36'	Stadium: Cliftonhill; Attendance: 13,000 (estimated); Referee: D Calder

18 February 1928	Celtic	2–0	Alloa	Glasgow
	Connolly 10'; McGrory 35'	Report		Stadium: Celtic Park; Attendance: 7,000; Referee: A Scott

18 February 1928	Dundee	1–2	Dunfermline Athletic	Dundee
	Whitlow	Report	Young; Wilson	Stadium: Dens Park; Attendance: 11,000; Referee: R Innes

18 February 1928	Rangers	3–1	King's Park	Glasgow
	Morton; Cunningham	Report	Lennon	Stadium: Ibrox; Attendance: 20,000; Referee: T Small

18 February 1928	Kilmarnock	4–4	Queen's Park	Kilmarnock
	Cunningham 5' (pen.); Smith 75'; Morton	Report	Chalmers 8'; McAlpine; McLelland; Nicholson	Stadium: Rugby Park; Attendance: 21,000 (estimated); Referee: P Craigmyle

18 February 1928	Hearts	1–2	Motherwell	Edinburgh
	Murray	Report	Stevenson	Stadium: Tynecastle; Attendance: 42,000; Referee: C Bilney

Replays

The matches were played on 22 February 1928.

22 February 1928	Queen's Park	1–0	Kilmarnock	Glasgow
	McLelland 85'	Report		Stadium: Hampden; Attendance: 36,000; Referee: P Craigmyle

22 February 1928	Falkirk	0–1 (a.e.t)	Hibernian	Falkirk
		Report	McColl	Stadium: Brockville; Attendance: 15,000 (estimated); Referee: T Dougray

== Fourth round ==
Team One	Team Two	Score
Albion Rovers	Rangers	0–1
Dunfermline Athletic	Hibernian	0–4
Motherwell	Celtic	0–2
Queens Park	Partick Thistle	1–0

== Semi-finals ==
24 March 1928

Celtic	2–1	Queen’s Park
McLean 22'; McGrory 31'		McLelland 47'

Ibrox Park, Glasgow
Attendance: 54,000

24 March 1928

Rangers	3–0	Hibernian
Archibald; McPhail; Simpson

Tynecastle Park, Edinburgh
Attendance: 43,129

== Final ==
14 April 1928

Rangers	4–0	Celtic
Meiklejohn (pen.); McPhail; Archibald

Hampden Park, Glasgow
Attendance: 118,115

=== Teams ===
Celtic:
GK	John Thomson
RB	Willie McStay
LB	John Donoghue
RH	Peter Wilson
CH	Jimmy McStay
LH	John McFarlane
OR	Paddy Connolly
IR	Alec Thomson
CF	Jimmy McGrory
IL	Tommy McInally
OL	Adam McLean

Rangers:
GK	Tom Hamilton
RB	Dougie Gray
LB	Bob Hamilton
RH	Jock Buchanan
CH	Davie Meiklejohn
LH	Tully Craig
OR	Sandy Archibald
IR	Andy Cunningham
CF	Jimmy Fleming
IL	Bob McPhail
OL	Alan Morton

== See also ==
- 1927–28 in Scottish football
