= 1922–23 Celtic F.C. season =

Celtic
1922–23 season
- Manager: Willie Maley
- Stadium: Celtic Park
- Scottish First Division: 3rd
- Scottish Cup: Winners

The 1922–23 Scottish football season was Celtic's 35th season of competitive football, in which they competed in the Scottish First Division and the Scottish Cup.

Celtic ended third in the league, below champions Rangers and runners-up Airdrieonians. It was the worst placement in the league for Celtic since the 1910-11 season, as they had ended either champions or runners-up for the previous eleven campaigns. The start of 1923 saw the team hit a rough patch of eight league games without a win, four defeats and four draws. They regained form somewhat after that, only losing one of their last 13 matches.

Their Scottish Cup campaign proved way more successful, as Celtic would be crowned champions for the 10th time, their 26th major domestic honour. Celtic eliminated Lochgelly United away and Hurlford, East Fife and Raith Rovers home to reach the semi-finals, in which they defeated Motherwell at Ibrox Park. In the final, Celtic defeated Hibernian 1-0 at Hampden Park.

This was the last full season at Celtic for captain Willie Cringan, as he would depart the club shortly after the beginning of the following campaign.

== Competitions ==
=== Scottish First Division ===
==== League table ====
Pos	Team	Pld	W	D	L	GF	GA	GD	Pts
1	Rangers	38	23	9	6	67	29	+38	55
2	Airdrieonians	38	20	10	8	58	38	+20	50
3	Celtic	38	19	8	11	52	39	+13	46
4	Falkirk	38	14	17	7	44	32	+12	45
5	Aberdeen	38	15	12	11	46	34	+12	42

Source: "1922-1923 Division 1 - SPFL Archive". SPFL.

==== Matches ====
19 August 1922 First Division	Alloa Athletic	2–3	Celtic	Alloa
				Stadium: Recreation Park; Attendance: 10,783

26 August 1922 First Division	Celtic	2–1	Hamilton Academical	Glasgow
				Stadium: Celtic Park; Attendance: 10,000

9 September 1922 First Division	Celtic	3–0	Raith Rovers	Glasgow
				Stadium: Celtic Park; Attendance: 14,000

18 September 1922 First Division	Hibernian	1–0	Celtic	Edinburgh
				Stadium: Easter Road; Attendance: 15,000

23 September 1922 First Division	Dundee	0–1	Celtic	Dundee
				Stadium: Dens Park; Attendance: 25,000

25 September 1922 First Division	Aberdeen	3–1	Celtic	Aberdeen
				Stadium: Pittodrie Park; Attendance: 23,500

7 October 1922 First Division	Celtic	4–3	Partick Thistle	Glasgow
				Stadium: Celtic Park; Attendance: 10,000

14 October 1922 First Division	Celtic	1–0	Motherwell	Glasgow
				Stadium: Celtic Park; Attendance: 12,000

21 October 1922 First Division	Morton	0–1	Celtic	Greenock
				Stadium: Cappielow Park; Attendance: 10,000

28 October 1922 First Division	Celtic	1–3	Rangers	Glasgow
				Stadium: Celtic Park; Attendance: 44,000

4 November 1922 First Division	Clyde	0–1	Celtic	Glasgow
				Stadium: Shawfield Stadium; Attendance: 13,000

11 November 1922 First Division	Celtic	1–4	Ayr United	Glasgow
				Stadium: Celtic Park; Attendance: 7,000

18 November 1922 First Division	Airdrieonians	1–0	Celtic	Airdrie
				Stadium: Broomfield Park; Attendance: 12,000

25 November 1922 First Division	Celtic	3–0	Third Lanark	Glasgow
				Stadium: Celtic Park; Attendance: 10,000

2 December 1922 First Division	Albion Rovers	2–3	Celtic	Coatbridge
				Stadium: Cliftonhill; Attendance: 8,000

9 December 1922 First Division	Celtic	1–1	Falkirk	Glasgow
				Stadium: Celtic Park; Attendance: 12,000

16 December 1922 First Division	Hearts	0–3	Celtic	Glasgow
				Stadium: Celtic Park; Attendance: 32,500

23 December 1922 First Division	Celtic	1–2	Kilmarnock	Glasgow
				Stadium: Celtic Park; Attendance: 8,000

30 December 1922 First Division	Raith Rovers	0–3	Celtic	Kirkcaldy
				Stadium: Stark's Park; Attendance: 7,000

1 January 1923 First Division	Rangers	2–0	Celtic	Glasgow
				Stadium: Ibrox Park; Attendance: 50,000

2 January 1923 First Division	Celtic	0–0	Clyde	Glasgow
				Stadium: Celtic Park; Attendance: 8,000

6 January 1923 First Division	Celtic	1–2	Aberdeen	Glasgow
				Stadium: Celtic Park; Attendance: 15,000

20 January 1923 First Division	Third Lanark	1–0	Celtic	Glasgow
				Stadium: Cathkin Park; Attendance: 25,000

31 January 1923 First Division	Celtic	0–0	Hibernian	Glasgow
				Stadium: Celtic Park; Attendance: 15,000

3 February 1923 First Division	Kilmarnock	4–3	Celtic	Kilmarnock
				Stadium: Rugby Park; Attendance: 7,500

14 February 1923 First Division	Celtic	1–1	Albion Rovers	Glasgow
				Stadium: Celtic Park; Attendance: 5,000

17 February 1923 First Division	Falkirk	0–0	Celtic	Falkirk
				Stadium: Brockville Park; Attendance: 10,000

27 February 1923 First Division	Celtic	1–0	St Mirren	Glasgow
				Stadium: Celtic Park; Attendance: 8,000

3 March 1923 First Division	Celtic	1–0	Alloa Athletic	Glasgow
				Stadium: Celtic Park; Attendance: 4,000

14 March 1923 First Division	Hamilton Academial	1–1	Celtic	Hamilton
				Stadium: Douglas Park; Attendance: 7,000

17 March 1923 First Division	Celtic	2–1	Dundee	Glasgow
				Stadium: Celtic Park; Attendance: 7,000

24 March 1923 First Division	Celtic	3–1	Morton	Glasgow
				Stadium: Celtic Park; Attendance: 10,000

2 April 1923 First Division	Partick Thistle	0–2	Celtic	Glasgow
				Stadium: Firhill Park; Attendance: 12,000

7 April 1923 First Division	Celtic	2–1	Hearts	Glasgow
				Stadium: Celtic Park; Attendance: 11,000

10 April 1923 First Division	St Mirren	1–0	Celtic	Paisley
				Stadium: St Mirren Park, Love Street; Attendance: 7,000

21 April 1923 First Division	Motherwell	0–0	Celtic	Motherwell
				Stadium: Fir Park; Attendance: 7,000

25 April 1923 First Division	Ayr United	0–1	Celtic	Ayr
				Stadium: Somerset Park; Attendance: 4,000

28 April 1923 First Division	Celtic	1–1	Airdrieonians	Glasgow
				Stadium: Celtic Park; Attendance: 10,000

=== Scottish Cup ===
13 January 1923 First round	Lochgelly United	2–3	Celtic	Lochgelly
				Stadium: Recreation Park; Attendance: 9,000

27 January 1923 Second round	Celtic	4–0	Hurlford	Glasgow
				Stadium: Celtic Park; Attendance: 5,000

10 February 1923 Third round	Celtic	2–1	East Fife	Glasgow
				Stadium: Celtic Park; Attendance: 12,000

24 February 1923 Fourth round	Celtic	1–0	Raith Rovers	Glasgow
				Stadium: Celtic Park; Attendance: 30,000

10 March 1923 Semi-final	Celtic	2–0	Motherwell	Glasgow
				Stadium: Ibrox Park; Attendance: 71,506

31 March 1923 Final	Celtic	1–0	Hibernian	Glasgow
				Stadium: Hampden Park; Attendance: 80,100
