= Arthur Dixon (footballer, born 1892) =

English footballer

Personal information
- Full name: Arthur Dixon
- Date of birth: 4 July 1892
- Place of birth: Chadderton, England
- Date of death: 25 December 1965 (aged 73)
- Place of death: Middleton, England
- Height: 5 ft 8 in (1.73 m)
- Position: Centre half

Youth career
- Tonge

Senior career*
| Years | Team | Apps | (Gls) |
| 1913–1916 | Oldham Athletic | | |
| 1916 | → St Mirren (loan) | 11 | (0) |
| 1916–1917 | St Mirren | 37 | (2) |
| 1917–1926 | Rangers | 326 | (6) |
| 1918 | → St Mirren (loan) | 1 | (0) |
| 1927–1929 | Cowdenbeath | 66 | (3) |

Managerial career
- 1930–1932: Dolphin
- * Club domestic league appearances and goals

Arthur Dixon (4 July 1892 – 25 December 1965) was an English footballer who played as a central defender, primarily for Rangers where he played between 1917 and 1926. He later became trainer at the club and assistant to manager Bill Struth after his retirement from playing. He also featured for Oldham Athletic in England, and for St Mirren and Cowdenbeath in Scotland. He was the father of footballer Arthur Dixon.

== Playing career ==
Chadderton, Lancashire-born Dixon began his career at hometown club Oldham Athletic, and was part of the squad that finished runners-up in the English Football League in 1914–15, one point behind champions Everton. The continuation of World War I then caused the cancellations of official football in England, although the Scottish Football League continued; Dixon played for St Mirren (the move to Scotland possibly related to undertaking wartime work in the area), initially on loan from Oldham then as a permanent signing. He then joined Rangers on 11 July 1917, being signed by the then-manager William Wilton. He made his league debut in a 1–0 win away to Kilmarnock on 18 August 1917. Dixon was soon to establish himself as an influential player for the club. He scored his first goal on 8 March 1919 in a 3–0 league win against Hamilton Academical.

He enjoyed a benefit match at Ibrox Park on 10 September 1923: A crowd of 10,000 watched Rangers draw 1–1 with Liverpool. The Rangers side was Hamilton (goalkeeper), Manderson, Meiklejohn, Dixon, McCandless, Archibald, Muirhead, Morton, Hansen, Cairns. The goalscorer for Rangers was Hansen.

In total Dixon made 393 appearances (including 326 league and 35 Scottish Cup) for Rangers. He scored eight goals (six times in the league and twice in the cup). He won six league championships, six Glasgow Cups and four Charity Cups. At the end of the 1925–26 season he retired from playing, only to reverse his decision and play regularly for Cowdenbeath, then also competing in Scotland's top tier, for two further seasons.

== Coaching career ==
Dixon began his coaching career in Dublin with Dolphin as a player-manager in 1930. He would later become a coach at Rangers from July 1932. In addition to his involvement in what was another successful era for the club, he was responsible for the signing of Alex Stevenson, an Irish international from his former club in Dublin.
