= Thomas Hamilton (footballer, born 1906) =

Scottish footballer

Tom Hamilton
Personal information
- Full name: Thomas Hamilton
- Date of birth: 1906
- Place of birth: Renfrew, Scotland
- Date of death: July 1964 (aged 57–58)
- Position: Goalkeeper

Senior career*
Years	Team	Apps	(Gls)
–	Kirkintilloch Rob Roy		
1923–1934	Rangers	243	(0)
1934–1935	Falkirk	25	(0)
Total		268	(0)

International career
1932	Scotland	1	(0)
- * Club domestic league appearances and goals

Thomas Hamilton (1906–1964) was a Scottish footballer best known for his time with Rangers. He was a goalkeeper.

== Career ==
Hamilton began his career at Kirkintilloch Rob Roy. He joined Rangers in 1923, but had to wait until 31 October 1925 to make his debut; the gamed ended in a 1–0 away defeat to Raith Rovers.

During the 1928 Scottish Cup Final in front of a crowd of 118,115 he made an important save to deny Celtic's Paddy Connolly whilst the game was goalless. Rangers went on to win the match 4–0 with a brace from Sandy Archibald and Davie Meiklejohn and Bob McPhail scoring one apiece.

Whilst at Ibrox he won five Scottish league championships, four Scottish Cups, two Glasgow Cups and six Charity Cups. He left in 1934 after making 286 appearances for the club in the two major competitions. His final senior club was Falkirk.

Hamilton won one Scotland cap, in 1932 against England.
