= Robert Hamilton (Irish footballer) =

Irish footballer

Bob Hamilton
Personal information
- Full name: Robert Templeton Hamilton
- Date of birth: 11 November 1903
- Place of birth: Newry, County Down, Ireland
- Date of death: 7 February 1964 (aged 60)
- Place of death: Cardiff, Wales
- Position: Defender

Senior career*
Years	Team	Apps	(Gls)
- Newry Town
1927–1933	Rangers	121	(0)
1933–1935	Bradford City	23	(0)
1935–1937	Third Lanark	47	(1)
1937–1938	Morton	9	(0)
1938–1939	Bangor		

International career
1927	Irish League XI	1	(0)
1928–1931	Ireland	5	(0)
- * Club domestic league appearances and goals

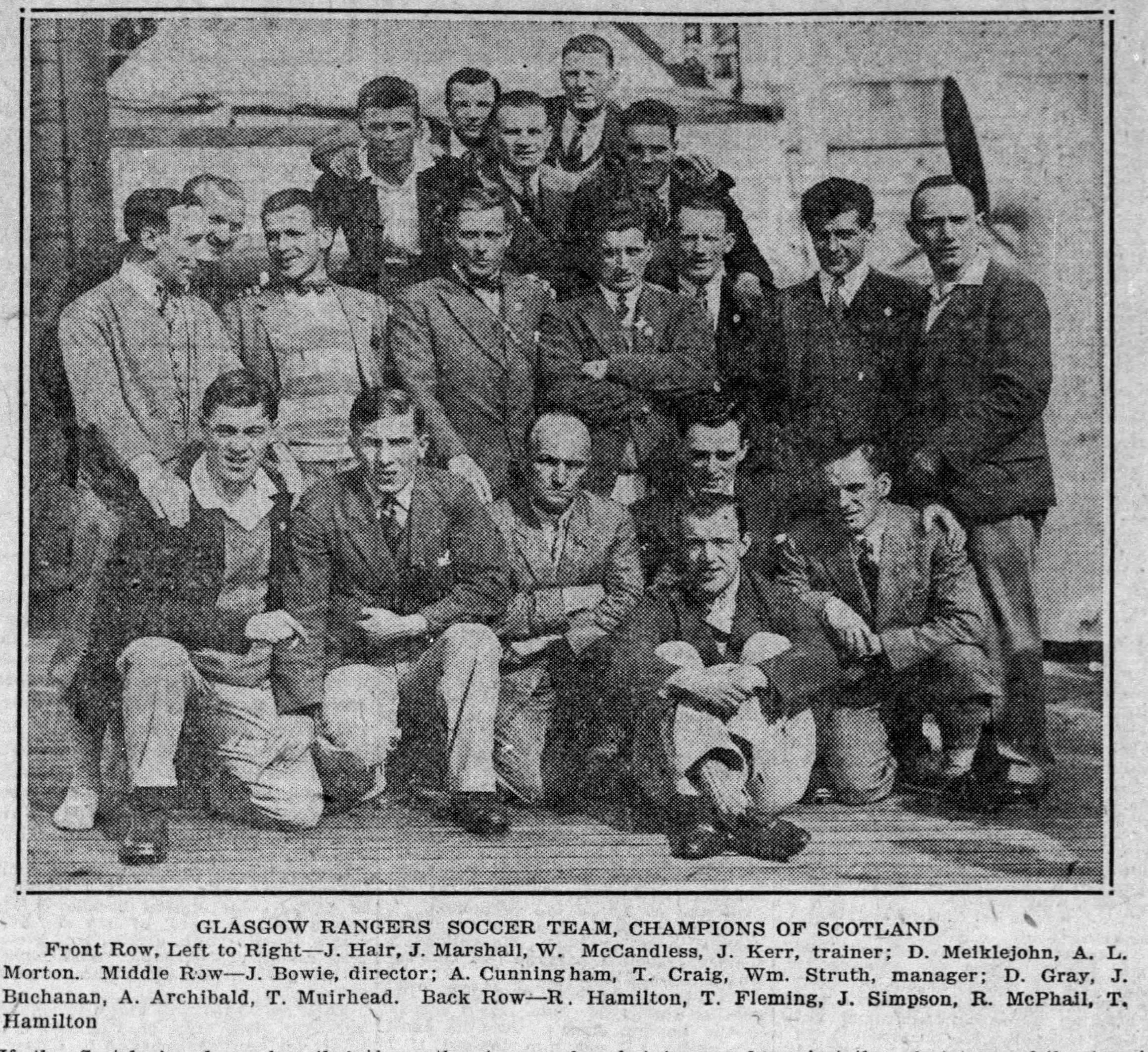

Robert "Bud" Templeton Hamilton (11 November 1903 – 7 February 1964) was an Irish professional footballer.

Hamilton started his career with his hometown club, Newry Town. He then moved to Scotland with Rangers, where he was a member of their 1929–30 'clean-sweep' team which claimed the Scottish Football League championship, Scottish Cup, Glasgow Cup and Charity Cup. He had already won the double in 1927–28 and the league title in 1928–29 (losing in the 1929 Scottish Cup Final), and claimed one further championship medal in 1930–31.

He left Ibrox in February 1933 to sign for English Division Two side, Bradford City. In two seasons at Valley Parade he made 26 appearances before moving north of the border again to join Third Lanark (taking part in the 1936 Scottish Cup Final, a defeat to former employers Rangers), and later moved to Morton before returning to Northern Ireland with Bangor.

Whilst with Rangers, Hamilton added five Ireland caps to the Inter-League honour he had won while with Newry Town just before moving to Glasgow. He tasted victory just once, on his debut against Scotland in February 1928.
