= Bob Morton (Scottish footballer) =

Scottish association football player

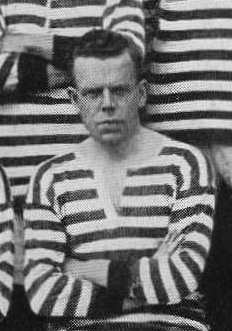
- Morton in 1917

Personal information
- Full name: Robert Muir Morton
- Date of birth: 25 February 1891
- Place of birth: Renfrew, Scotland
- Date of death: 4 December 1948 (aged 57)
- Place of death: Cathcart, Scotland
- Position: Centre forward

Senior career*
Years	Team	Apps	(Gls)
1912–1920	Queen's Park	134	(82)
- * Club domestic league appearances and goals

Robert Muir Morton (25 February 1891 – 4 December 1948) was a Scottish amateur footballer who played as a forward and scored 82 goals in 134 Scottish League appearances for Queen's Park.

== Personal life ==
Morton's younger brother Alan also became a footballer and the pair were teammates for six seasons at Queen's Park.

== Career statistics ==
Appearances and goals by club, season and competition
Club	Season	League			Scottish Cup		Other		Total	
Club	Season	Division	Apps	Goals	Apps	Goals	Apps	Goals	Apps	Goals
Queen's Park	1912–13	Scottish First Division	1	0	0	0	0	0	1	0
Queen's Park	1913–14	Scottish First Division	31	22	5	4	1 (Note: Appearance in Glasgow Cup)	2	37	28
Queen's Park	1915–16	Scottish First Division	31	15	—		2 (Note: Appearances in Glasgow Merchants Charity Cup)	0	33	15
Queen's Park	1916–17	Scottish First Division	12	5	—		2 (Note: 1 appearance in Glasgow Cup, 1 appearance in Glasgow Merchants Charity Cup)	0	14	5
Queen's Park	1917–18	Scottish First Division	19	15	—		3 (Note: 1 appearance in Glasgow Cup, 1 appearance in Glasgow Merchants Charity Cup, 1 appearance in Navy and Army War Fund Shield)	0	22	15
Queen's Park	1918–19	Scottish First Division	26	21	—		5 (Note: 2 appearances and 1 goal in Glasgow Merchants Charity Cup, 2 appearances in Victory Cup, 1 appearance and 1 goal in Glasgow Cup)	2	31	23
Queen's Park	1919–20	Scottish First Division	14	4	3	1	1	0	18	5
Career total			134	82	8	5	14	4	155	91
