= John Donoghue (footballer) =

American-born Scottish footballer

Personal information
- Date of birth: 8 December 1902 (Note: Some sources give 22 January 1903.)
- Place of birth: New York City, United States
- Date of death: 11 July 1971 (aged 68)
- Place of death: Glasgow, Scotland
- Position: Defender

Youth career
- St Francis

Senior career*
Years	Team	Apps	(Gls)
–1928	Shawfield Juniors		
1926–1930	Celtic	48	(1)
1930–1932	Wrexham	67	(2)
1932	Celtic	0	(0)
1932–1935	Excelsior Roubaix		
- * Club domestic league appearances and goals

John Donoghue was a Scottish professional footballer who played as a left back.

== Career ==
Born in New York City to Irish parents who then moved to Scotland when he was young, Donoghue played for Shawfield Juniors, Celtic, Wrexham and Excelsior Roubaix.

He won two Glasgow Cups with Celtic and played on the losing side in the 1928 Scottish Cup Final; he took part in earlier rounds the previous season when they won the trophy, but was not involved in the final.

== Honours ==
Wrexham

- Welsh Cup: 1930–31
