= 1921–22 Scottish Cup =

Tournament details
- Country: Scotland

Final positions
- Champions: Morton
- Runners-up: Rangers

The 1921–22 Scottish Cup was the 44th staging of Scotland's most prestigious football knockout competition. The Cup was won by Morton who defeated Rangers in the final.

== Fourth round ==
Team One	Team Two	Score
Hamilton Academical	Aberdeen	0–0 / 0–2 (R)
Motherwell	Morton	1–2
Partick Thistle	Queen of the South	1–0
Rangers	St Mirren	1–1 / 2–0 (R)

== Semi-finals ==
25 March 1922

Rangers	2–0	Partick Thistle
Geordie Henderson 25'; Sandy Archibald 30' (pen.)

Ibrox, Glasgow
Attendance: 60,000

1 April 1922

Morton	3–1	Aberdeen

Dens Park, Dundee
Attendance: 20,000

== Final ==
15 April 1922

Morton	1–0	Rangers
Jimmy Gourlay 12'

Hampden Park, Glasgow
Attendance: 70,000

== See also ==
- 1921–22 in Scottish football
