= 1928–29 in Scottish football =

Football in Scotland
- Season: 1928–29

1928–29 in Scottish football

Division One champions
- Rangers

Division Two champions
- Dundee United

Scottish Cup winners
- Kilmarnock

Junior Cup winners
- Dundee Violet

Scotland national team
- 1929 BHC

The 1928–29 season was the 56th season of competitive football in Scotland and the 39th season of the Scottish Football League.

== League competitions ==
=== Scottish League Division One ===
Pos	Team	Pld	W	D	L	GF	GA	GD	Pts
1	Rangers	38	30	7	1	107	32	+75	67
2	Celtic	38	22	7	9	67	44	+23	51
3	Motherwell	38	20	10	8	85	66	+19	50
4	Heart of Midlothian	38	19	9	10	91	57	+34	47
5	Queen's Park	38	18	7	13	100	69	+31	43
6	Partick Thistle	38	17	7	14	91	70	+21	41
7	Aberdeen	38	16	8	14	81	68	+13	40
8	St Mirren	38	16	8	14	78	75	+3	40
9	St Johnstone	38	14	10	14	57	70	−13	38
10	Kilmarnock	38	14	8	16	79	74	+5	36
11	Falkirk	38	14	8	16	68	86	−18	36
12	Hamilton Academical	38	13	9	16	58	83	−25	35
13	Cowdenbeath	38	14	5	19	55	69	−14	33
14	Hibernian	38	13	6	19	54	62	−8	32
15	Airdrieonians	38	12	7	19	56	65	−9	31
16	Ayr United	38	12	7	19	65	84	−19	31
17	Clyde	38	12	6	20	47	71	−24	30
18	Dundee	38	9	11	18	59	59	0	29
19	Third Lanark	38	10	6	22	71	102	−31	26
20	Raith Rovers	38	9	6	23	52	105	−53	24

Champions: Rangers
Relegated: Third Lanark, Raith Rovers

=== Scottish League Division Two ===
Pos	Team	Pld	W	D	L	GF	GA	GD	Pts	Promotion or relegation
1	Dundee United	36	24	3	9	99	55	+44	51	Promotion to the 1929–30 First Division
2	Morton	36	21	8	7	85	49	+36	50	Promotion to the 1929–30 First Division
3	Arbroath	36	19	9	8	90	60	+30	47	
4	Albion Rovers	36	18	8	10	95	67	+28	44	
5	Leith Athletic	36	18	7	11	78	56	+22	43	
6	St Bernard's	36	16	9	11	77	55	+22	41	
7	Forfar Athletic	35	14	10	11	69	75	−6	38	
8	East Fife	35	15	6	14	88	77	+11	36	
9	Queen of the South	36	16	4	16	86	79	+7	36	
10	Bo'ness	35	15	5	15	62	62	0	35	
11	Dunfermline Athletic	36	13	7	16	66	72	−6	33	
12	East Stirlingshire	36	14	4	18	71	75	−4	32	
13	Alloa Athletic	36	12	7	17	64	77	−13	31	
14	Dumbarton	36	11	9	16	59	78	−19	31	
15	King's Park	36	8	13	15	60	84	−24	29	
16	Clydebank	36	11	5	20	70	85	−15	27	
17	Arthurlie	32	9	7	16	51	73	−22	25	Resigned, fixtures stand
18	Stenhousemuir	35	9	6	20	51	90	−39	24	
19	Armadale	36	8	7	21	47	99	−52	23	
20	Bathgate	0	0	0	0	0	0	0	0	Resigned, fixtures expunged

NOTE: Arthurlie resigned – fixtures stand
Bathgate resigned – fixtures expunged

Promoted: Dundee United, Greenock Morton

== Other honours ==
=== National ===
Competition	Winner	Score	Runner-up
Scottish Cup	Kilmarnock	2 – 0	Rangers
Scottish Qualifying Cup	Murrayfield Amateurs	8 – 1	Thornhill
Scottish Junior Cup	Dundee Violet	4 – 0	Maryhill Hibernian
Scottish Amateur Cup	Murrayfield Amateurs	2 – 1	Queen's Park Victoria XI (Note: The Victoria XI were the fourth XI of Queen's Park.)
Queen's Park Shield	Edinburgh University		

=== County ===
Competition	Winner	Score	Runner-up
Aberdeenshire Cup	Aberdeen	9 – 3 (Note: Aggregate score over two legs.)	Huntly
Ayrshire Cup	Ayr United	5 – 1	Kilmarnock
Dumbartonshire Cup	Clydebank	1 – 0	Dumbarton
East of Scotland Shield	Hibernian	3 – 2	Hearts
Fife Cup	Cowdenbeath	3 – 2 (Note: Replay needed.)	Raith Rovers
Forfarshire Cup	Dundee United	2 – 1	Forfar Athletic
Glasgow Cup	Celtic	2 – 0	Queen's Park
Lanarkshire Cup	Motherwell	5 – 2	Albion Rovers
North of Scotland Cup	Inverness Citadel	2 – 1	Nairn County
Perthshire Cup	St Johnstone	4 – 0	Vale of Atholl
Renfrewshire Cup	St Mirren	7 – 2	Morton
Southern Counties Cup	Mid Annandale	2 – 0	St Cuthbert Wanderers
Stirlingshire Cup	East Stirling	3 – 1	Falkirk Amateurs

=== Non-league honours ===
Highland League

Top Three
Pos	Team	Pld	W	D	L	GF	GA	GD	Pts
1	Inverness Thistle	22	14	4	4	54	35	+19	32
2	Elgin City	22	13	3	6	49	36	+13	29
3	Clachnacuddin	22	12	5	5	60	30	+30	29

Source: SFHA

East of Scotland League

Top Three
Pos	Team	Pld	W	D	L	GF	GA	GD	Pts
1	Peebles Rovers	28	17	5	6	81	45	+36	39
2	Berwick Rangers	28	16	6	6	88	51	+37	38
3	Corstorpine Amateurs	27	14	4	9	89	54	+35	32

Source: SFHA

== Scotland national team ==
Date	Venue	Opponents	Score	Competition	Scotland scorer(s)
27 October 1928	Ibrox Park, Glasgow (H)	Wales	4–2	BHC	Hughie Gallacher (3), James Dunn
23 February 1929	Windsor Park, Belfast (A)	Ireland	7–3	BHC	Hughie Gallacher (4), Alex Jackson (2), Alex James
13 April 1929	Hampden Park, Glasgow (H)	England	1–0	BHC	Alec Cheyne
26 May 1929	Brann Stadium, Bergen (A)	Norway	7–3	Friendly	Alec Cheyne (3), Jimmy Nisbet (2), Bobby Rankin, Tully Craig
1 June 1929	Grunewald Stadium, Berlin (A)	Germany	1–1	Friendly	Willie Imrie
4 June 1929	Olympic Stadium, Amsterdam (A)	Netherlands	2–0	Friendly	Jimmy Fleming, Bobby Rankin (pen.)

Scotland were winners of the 1928–29 British Home Championship. 1929 also saw Scotland compete against non-British teams for the first time.

Key:

- (H) = Home match
- (A) = Away match
- BHC = British Home Championship

== Other national teams ==
=== Scottish League XI ===
Date	Venue	Opponents	Score (Note: Scottish League XI's score is shown first.)	Scotland scorer(s)
31 October 1928	Firhill, Glasgow (H)	(Northern Ireland) Irish League XI	8–2	
7 November 1928	Villa Park, Birmingham (A)	(England) Football League XI	1–2	

=== Scottish national amateur team ===
Date	Venue	Opponents	Score (Note: Scotland amateur team's score is shown first.)	Competition	Scotland scorer(s)
16 March 1929	Elland Road, Leeds (A)	England	1–3	Friendly	

== See also ==
- Glasgow Dental Hospital Cup
