= Douglas McLelland =

Scottish footballer

Personal information
- Full name: Douglas McLelland
- Date of birth: 17 December 1905
- Place of birth: Dalry, Scotland
- Position: Centre forward

Senior career*
| Years | Team | Apps | (Gls) |
| 1927–1934 | Queen's Park | 133 | (87) |

International career
| 1928–1930 | Scotland Amateurs | 5 | (2) |
- * Club domestic league appearances and goals

Douglas McLelland was a Scottish amateur football centre forward who made over 130 appearances in the Scottish League for Queen's Park. He represented Scotland at amateur level.
