= Willie Imrie =

Scottish footballer

Personal information
- Full name: William Noble Imrie
- Date of birth: 4 March 1908
- Place of birth: Methil, Scotland
- Date of death: 26 December 1944 (aged 36)
- Place of death: Windygates, Fife, Scotland
- Height: 5 ft 10 in (1.78 m)
- Position: Right half

Youth career
- Dunnikier Juniors

Senior career*
Years	Team	Apps	(Gls)
1927–1929	St Johnstone	72	(7)
1929–1933	Blackburn Rovers	165	(23)
1933–1938	Newcastle United	125	(24)
1938–1939	Swansea Town	27	(1)
1939–1940	Swindon Town	2	(0)
Total		391	(55)

International career
1929	Scotland	2	(1)
- * Club domestic league appearances and goals

William Noble Imrie (4 March 1908 – 26 December 1944) was a Scottish footballer who played as a right half.

== Career ==
Born in Methil, Imrie played club football for St Johnstone, Blackburn Rovers, Newcastle United, Swansea Town and Swindon Town. He made two appearances for Scotland in 1929 whilst a St Johnstone player, and scored one goal against Germany.

He later became a butcher, before joining the Royal Air Force, in which he rose to corporal, during World War II. He developed stomach cancer whilst on active duty and died in hospital in Fife in 1944. One of only five Swindon players who died serving during the war, he is included on the club's commemorative plaque unveiled in 2014.
