= John Hempsey =

Scottish footballer

Personal information
- Full name: John Hempsey
- Date of birth: 1889
- Place of birth: Greenock, Scotland
- Date of death: 2 August 1938 (aged 49)
- Place of death: Glasgow, Scotland
- Position: Goalkeeper

Senior career*
Years	Team	Apps	(Gls)
1911–1912	Morton	3	(0)
1912–1920	Rangers	147	(0)
1913	→ Morton (loan)		
1917	→ Kilmarnock (loan)	1	(0)
1920–1921	King's Park		
1921–1922	Morton	3	(0)
- * Club domestic league appearances and goals

John Hempsey (1889 – 2 August 1938) was a Scottish footballer who played as a goalkeeper for Rangers, Morton and Kilmarnock.

Hempsey began his career at Port Glasgow Athletic (no official appearances registered) before moving to Morton in 1911. He joined Rangers a year later and would make 167 appearances in all competitions during his eight-year spell, winning the Scottish Football League title in 1912–13 after replacing the injured Herbert Lock. Rivals Celtic thereafter dominated the league during the World War I period, but Hempsey did pick up four winner's medals from the Glasgow Cup (also serving two short loan spells at Morton and Kilmarnock) before Lock took over as the regular again in 1919–20. Hempsey joined King's Park, then playing in the Central Football League, for a year and returned to Greenock for a final season (serving as back-up to Dave Edwards) before retiring.
