= Tommy McInally =

Scottish footballer

Personal information
- Full name: Thomas McInally
- Birth name: Bernard McInally
- Date of birth: 18 December 1899
- Place of birth: Barrhead, Scotland
- Date of death: 29 December 1955 (aged 56)
- Position: Forward

Senior career*
| Years | Team | Apps | (Gls) |
- Croy Celtic
| 1918–1919 | St Anthony's | | |
| 1919–1922 | Celtic | 93 | (75) |
| 1922–1925 | Third Lanark | 87 | (40) |
| 1925–1928 | Celtic | 96 | (42) |
| 1928–1929 | Sunderland | 35 | (3) |
| 1929–1930 | Bournemouth | | |
| 1930 | Morton | 7 | (0) |
| 1931 | Derry City | | |
- Armadale

International career
| 1926 | Scotland | 2 | (0) |
- * Club domestic league appearances and goals

Thomas McInally (18 December 1899 – 29 December 1955) was a Scottish footballer who played as a forward.

== Career ==
McInally played for Celtic from 1919 to 1922 and 1925 to 1928, with a spell at Third Lanark in between.

He made 213 appearances and scored 127 goals for Celtic. His career was ultimately a disappointment because of his inability to accept discipline, yet he was generally reckoned to have been one of the most gifted players ever to have worn the green and white of Celtic and he remains extremely popular with their fans.

After leaving for the second time, he played in England for a season with Sunderland. McIally also played twice for the Scotland national team in 1926.

== Personal life ==
His birth name was actually Bernard McInally, but his first name had been changed to Thomas by the time of the 1901 census.

In the 2000s a sympathetic biography was published – "Tommy McInally – Celtic's Bad Bhoy?" by David Potter.
