= George McQueen =

Scottish footballer

Personal information
- Date of birth: 29 December 1895
- Place of birth: Dalserf, Scotland
- Date of death: 3 November 1951 (aged 55)
- Place of death: Ashgill, Scotland
- Position: Left back

Senior career*
Years	Team	Apps	(Gls)
–	Larkhall Thistle		
–	Parkhead		
1917–1921	Rangers	23	(0)
1918	→ St Mirren (loan)	1	(0)
1918	→ Third Lanark (loan)	1	(0)
1919	→ Kilmarnock (loan)	1	(0)
1919	→ Partick Thistle (loan)	2	(0)
1921–1933	Airdrieonians	388	(27)
Total		416	(27)

International career
1925	Scottish League XI	1	(0)
- * Club domestic league appearances and goals

George McQueen (29 December 1895 – 3 November 1951) was a Scottish footballer who played as a left back.

He began his career with Rangers, winning the Scottish Football League title in his first season, 1917–18, but found it difficult to remain in the team and served short loans with four clubs before being released in 1921. He signed for Airdrieonians and was immediately an important member of the side as they became one of the strongest in Scotland, finishing runners-up in the league for four seasons in succession and winning the Scottish Cup in 1924, McQueen lifting the trophy as captain. He remained with the Diamonds as a regular until retiring in 1933, aged 38, having made over 400 appearances overall and scored more than 30 goals from penalties and free-kicks, in which he specialised.

McQueen was selected for the Scottish Football League XI once in 1925 and travelled with the Scotland team as reserve defender in two occasions, but never received a full international cap.
