= Tully Craig =

Scottish footballer and manager (1895–1963)

Personal information
- Full name: Thomas Craig
- Date of birth: 18th July 1895
- Place of birth: Laurieston, Scotland
- Date of death: 30 January 1963 (aged 65–66)
- Place of death: Halifax, England
- Positions: Left half; utility player

Youth career
- Tullibody

Senior career*
Years	Team	Apps	(Gls)
–	Grange Rovers		
1919–1922	Celtic	8	(3)
1922–1923	Alloa Athletic	29	(7)
1923–1935	Rangers	234	(32)

International career
1925–1929	Scottish League XI	5	(1)
1927–1930	Scotland	8	(1)

Managerial career
- 1935–1950: Falkirk
- 1952–1953: Linfield
- * Club domestic league appearances and goals

Thomas "Tully" Craig (18th July 1895 – 30 January 1963) was a Scottish footballer who is best known for his time with Rangers, and also played for Celtic earlier in his career. He was a versatile player who could play up front, in midfield or defence.

== Playing career ==
Born in Laurieston on 18th July 1895 and with links to the small town of Tullibody from which his nickname derived, Craig was signed by Celtic from Junior side Grange Rovers in June 1919 and made his first team debut for the club in a 3–2 league win at Kilmarnock on 17 January 1920. The left-half impressed on his debut, scoring two goals, but he was deemed to be too lightweight by manager Willie Maley and consequently spent most of his time at Celtic Park in the reserves.

Maley was only too pleased to offload the player to Alloa Athletic in an exchange deal which saw Craig and two other Celts swapped for Willie Crilley. While Crilley would disappoint in the Hoops, Craig was a huge success at Alloa, so much so that after only one season Rangers bought him for a fee of seven hundred and fifty pounds.

In eleven years at Ibrox Craig played a significant role in seven Scottish League title-winning campaigns and was involved in three more to a smaller degree, won two Scottish Cups in 1928 and 1930 (also playing in the 1929 final, in which he became the first player to fail from the penalty spot in the event's history), two Glasgow Cups and four Charity Cups. He retired from playing in 1935.

Craig won eight Scotland caps between 1927 and 1930. He also represented the Scottish Football League XI.

== Managerial career ==
After his retirement he went on to manage both Falkirk from 1935 to 1950 and Linfield for a season.

== See also ==
- List of Scotland national football team captains
- Played for Celtic and Rangers
