= Alex Johnstone (footballer) =

Scottish footballer

Personal information
- Full name: Alexander Johnstone
- Date of birth: 16 April 1896
- Place of birth: Cullen, Moray, Scotland
- Date of death: 16 October 1979 (aged 83)
- Place of death: Preston, England
- Height: 5 ft 8 1/2 in (1.74 m)
- Position: Left half

Senior career*
Years	Team	Apps	(Gls)
–	Buckie Thistle		
1919–1924	Rangers	25	(1)
1921–1922	→ Third Lanark (loan)	30	(0)
1923	→ Third Lanark (loan)	0	(0)
1924–1928	Heart of Midlothian	59	(1)
Total		114	(1)
- * Club domestic league appearances and goals

Alexander Johnstone (16 April 1896 – 16 October 1979) was a Scottish footballer who played mainly as a left half.

== Career ==
Hailing from Banffshire, he moved to Glasgow in 1919 to sign for Rangers, playing in one Scottish Football League match during the 1919–20 season as the club won the title, then three in 1920–21 as they retained the championship. Finding the first team breakthrough difficult, he spent virtually all of 1921–22 on loan at Third Lanark. On returning to Ibrox he got slightly more chances in the side, playing in nine league matches of the title-winning 1922–23 Scottish Division One campaign and a Glasgow Cup final (but not its replay) but also being loaned back to Third Lanark intermittently, featuring exclusively in their Scottish Cup run which ended with a defeat at the semi-final stage. He then appeared for Rangers as they claimed the Glasgow Merchants Charity Cup. The 1923–24 season was his last with the Gers and most successful in terms of appearances, playing 12 times in another championship campaign – probably enough to be awarded a medal, unlike the previous years.

Heart of Midlothian paid £1,300 to sign Johnstone in November 1924. He was never an undisputed starter in his four seasons at Tynecastle Park, featuring in an average of 18 league fixtures over his first three seasons – in which time the team's form was a disappointment to their supporters – before falling out of favour after Hugh Shaw joined the club, with only six appearances in his last campaign, 1927–28. He did claim medals from the minor Dunedin Cup (two) and the East of Scotland Shield during his Hearts spell.

Now in his 30s, Johnstone's later playing career path is uncertain, with a Scottish statistical record noting only that he was on the Hearts 'Open To Transfer' list (unlikely to play, but under contract with a transfer fee required to play for other domestic clubs) for the next two seasons. It was common for players in those circumstances to play abroad, and he may have spent some time in the United States - an 'Alec Johnston' played for Fall River as they finished as winners of the 1928–29 American Soccer League, but it has not been confirmed if this was the same player owing to scant details on his origins and position.
