= John Nicholson (Scottish footballer) =

Scottish footballer

Jock Nicholson
Personal information
- Full name: John Andrew Nicholson
- Date of birth: 8 March 1888
- Place of birth: Ayr, Scotland
- Date of death: 13 June 1970 (aged 82)
- Place of death: Weston super Mare, Somerset, England
- Height: 5 ft 9 3/4 in (1.77 m)
- Position: Left half

Youth career
- Ashfield

Senior career*
Years	Team	Apps	(Gls)
1911–1921	Bristol City	197	(4)
1921–1924	Rangers	30	(1)
1924–1925	St Johnstone	12	(0)
- * Club domestic league appearances and goals

John Andrew Nicholson (8 March 1888 – 13 June 1970) was a Scottish footballer who played as a left half. He made over 190 Football League and 40 Scottish League appearances in the years before and after the First World War.

== Career ==
"Jock" Nicholson played locally for Glasgow Ashfield before Sam Hollis signed him in July 1911 for Bristol City. Nicholson made his debut for Bristol City in the Second Division at left half in a 1-0 win v Fulham on 2 September 1911 alongside Reuben Marr and Billy Wedlock in the half back line. In his debut season 1911-12 Nicholson made 37 appearances missing only one match. The following season Nicholson was again the regular left half making 33 appearances. In 1913-14 Nicholson made 31 appearances and switched from left half to replace Bob Young at right half after Christmas. Nicholson continued at right half in 1914-15 making 33 appearances playing alongside Billy Wedlock and Arthur Moss in the half backs; Nicholson also scored his first goal in a 2-3 defeat v Birmingham City on 19 December 1914. Nicholson did not play in war time matches for Bristol City but returned to the team as regular left half for the season 1919-20 making 28 appearances and scoring two goals. Nicholson also played in 4 of the 5 Cup ties including the semi-final as Bristol City reached the FA Cup Semi-final for only the second time in their history losing 1-2 to Huddersfield Town at Stamford Bridge (stadium). Nicholson took over from Wedlock as captain of Bristol City early in 1920-21 making 34 appearances scoring one goal and leading the team into 3rd place in the Second Division. Nicholson moved to Rangers in the summer of 1921. Nicholson made 17 appearances scoring one goal for Rangers in 1921-22, then 10 appearances in 1922-23 but only 3 appearances in 1923-24. Nicholson joined St Johnstone in the summer of 1924 and made 12 appearances in the 1924-25 season.

Jock Nicholson rejoined Bristol City as trainer in 1925 for six seasons following his retirement from playing. He also coached the Swiss club Etoile-Carouse, was trainer at Manchester United and coached in Sweden. After a final retirement from football Nicholson settled back near Bristol and died in Weston-super-Mare in 1970.

== Honours ==
with Bristol City

- FA Cup semi-finalist 1920
