= 1922–23 Scottish Division One =

24th season of top-tier football league in Scotland

Scottish Division One
- Season: 1922–23
- Champions: Rangers
- Relegated: Albion Rovers; Alloa Athletic

The 1922–23 Scottish Division One season was won by Rangers by five points over nearest rival Airdrieonians. Albion Rovers and Alloa Athletic finished 19th and 20th respectively and were relegated to the 1923–24 Scottish Division Two.

== League table ==
Pos	Team	Pld	W	D	L	GF	GA	GD	Pts
1	Rangers	38	23	9	6	67	29	+38	55
2	Airdrieonians	38	20	10	8	58	38	+20	50
3	Celtic	38	19	8	11	52	39	+13	46
4	Falkirk	38	14	17	7	44	32	+12	45
5	Aberdeen	38	15	12	11	46	34	+12	42
6	St Mirren	38	15	12	11	54	44	+10	42
7	Dundee	38	17	7	14	51	45	+6	41
8	Hibernian	38	17	7	14	45	40	+5	41
9	Raith Rovers	38	13	13	12	31	43	−12	39
10	Ayr United	38	13	12	13	43	44	−1	38
11	Partick Thistle	38	14	9	15	51	48	+3	37
12	Heart of Midlothian	38	11	15	12	51	50	+1	37
13	Motherwell	38	13	10	15	59	60	−1	36
14	Morton	38	12	11	15	44	47	−3	35
15	Kilmarnock	38	14	7	17	57	66	−9	35
16	Clyde	38	12	9	17	36	44	−8	33
17	Third Lanark	38	11	8	19	40	59	−19	30
18	Hamilton Academical	38	11	7	20	43	59	−16	29
19	Albion Rovers	38	8	10	20	38	64	−26	26
20	Alloa Athletic	38	6	11	21	27	52	−25	23

Source: "1922-1923 Division 1 - SPFL Archive". SPFL.

== Results ==
Home \ Away	ABE	AIR	ALB	ALO	AYR	CEL	CLY	DND	FAL	HAM	HOM	HIB	KIL	MOR	MOT	PAR	RAI	RAN	STM	THI
Aberdeen		0–1	1–2	1–0	4–1	3–1	1–0	0–0	1–1	1–0	0–1	2–0	5–0	1–1	2–1	0–0	1–0	0–0	4–2	1–1
Airdrieonians	2–0		2–0	0–2	2–1	1–0	1–1	1–1	5–1	3–1	2–2	2–1	4–1	1–0	4–1	3–3	4–0	1–0	2–1	1–0
Albion Rovers	0–2	1–2		2–1	2–1	2–3	3–0	0–0	1–2	2–0	1–2	1–2	1–1	3–0	1–1	0–1	1–2	2–1	2–0	0–1
Alloa Athletic	0–2	0–3	2–0		1–1	2–3	0–0	1–3	1–2	0–2	0–3	2–1	3–3	1–1	1–1	1–0	0–1	0–2	1–1	0–0
Ayr United	2–1	2–1	2–2	1–1		0–1	4–1	1–0	1–0	4–0	1–1	1–1	2–1	1–0	2–0	2–1	2–0	1–1	1–1	1–2
Celtic	1–2	1–1	1–1	1–0	1–4		0–0	2–1	1–1	2–1	2–1	0–0	1–2	3–1	1–0	4–3	3–0	1–3	1–0	3–0
Clyde	0–1	2–0	3–0	1–0	1–0	0–1		4–3	0–1	1–2	1–1	0–0	2–0	0–0	3–0	2–0	0–0	1–2	2–1	1–0
Dundee	1–1	1–0	4–0	2–1	1–0	0–1	1–0		3–0	3–0	0–0	1–0	2–0	0–1	3–1	1–0	0–4	1–2	2–0	2–0
Falkirk	2–2	1–1	1–0	0–0	0–0	0–0	0–0	1–0		3–1	1–0	5–0	0–0	3–0	1–0	1–1	1–1	2–0	1–1	4–0
Hamilton Academical	0–0	0–1	1–0	2–0	0–1	1–1	1–2	0–0	0–1		3–1	2–1	3–3	1–1	3–0	6–1	1–1	0–3	2–0	3–1
Heart of Midlothian	0–0	1–1	2–2	1–1	1–1	0–3	2–1	2–1	1–1	1–2		2–2	5–0	3–1	1–2	3–0	0–0	0–0	2–2	2–0
Hibernian	2–0	1–0	3–0	2–1	3–0	1–0	1–2	3–3	1–0	2–0	2–1		1–1	0–1	2–1	1–0	2–0	2–0	0–3	2–0
Kilmarnock	1–0	0–1	7–0	2–2	2–0	4–3	4–1	2–0	1–0	3–0	1–2	1–0		3–2	0–6	1–3	1–2	1–2	1–2	2–0
Morton	2–1	3–1	3–0	1–0	0–0	0–1	1–0	2–3	1–1	3–1	0–1	1–0	1–4		2–0	1–2	4–0	1–1	0–1	2–3
Motherwell	3–1	0–0	1–0	2–0	4–0	0–0	5–3	3–4	3–2	0–0	4–1	0–2	4–1	4–3		1–1	2–0	0–4	1–1	1–1
Partick Thistle	2–1	0–0	3–0	2–0	2–1	0–2	0–0	2–0	0–1	5–3	2–2	1–0	1–1	0–1	3–0		3–0	0–1	4–1	3–0
Raith Rovers	1–1	0–0	1–1	1–0	0–0	0–3	1–0	0–3	0–0	1–0	2–1	2–2	1–0	1–1	1–1	1–0		2–0	2–1	1–0
Rangers	1–1	4–1	2–2	2–0	2–1	2–0	2–1	4–1	2–0	3–0	3–0	2–0	1–0	0–0	2–1	4–1	1–0		1–1	5–1
St Mirren	0–1	4–0	1–1	0–1	0–0	1–0	2–0	4–0	2–2	2–1	2–1	2–1	2–0	1–1	3–3	1–0	1–1	1–0		3–1
Third Lanark	2–1	1–3	2–2	0–1	3–0	1–0	3–0	2–0	1–1	2–0	3–1	0–1	1–2	1–1	1–2	1–1	2–1	2–2	1–3	

Legend: Blue = home team win; Yellow = draw; Red = away team win.
