= James Walls =

Scottish footballer

Personal information
- Full name: James Walls
- Date of birth: 1892
- Place of birth: Baillieston, Scotland
- Position: Midfielder

Senior career*
Years	Team	Apps	(Gls)
1918–1924	Rangers	98	(4)
- * Club domestic league appearances and goals

James Walls (born 1892) was a Scottish footballer. He played with Rangers as a wing half.

Walls, nicknamed "'Fister", made 106 league and Scottish Cup appearances for the club during a six-year spell, scoring four goals. Walls had a testimonial at Ibrox on 7 April 1925 against Newcastle United which Rangers won 1–0.
