= Carl Hansen (footballer) =

Danish footballer (1898–1978)

Personal information
- Full name: Carl William Hansen
- Date of birth: 7 May 1898
- Place of birth: Copenhagen, Denmark
- Date of death: 19 May 1978 (aged 80)
- Place of death: Copenhagen, Denmark
- Position: Striker

Senior career*
Years	Team	Apps	(Gls)
1915	ØB		
1915–1921	B 1903	22	(14)
1921–1925	Rangers	23	(14)
1927–1928	B 1903		

International career
1918–1921	Denmark	7	(3)

Managerial career
- 1933: BK Fremad Amager
- AB
- 1941–1943: B93
- 1943–1948: B 1903
- 1949–1952: B93
- 1952: Denmark
- 1962: BK Frem
- * Club domestic league appearances and goals

Carl Vilhelm "Skoma'r" Hansen, simply known as Carl "Skoma'r" (17 May 1898 – 19 May 1978), was a Danish association football player and coach. He played in the forward position, and won the Danish championship with Boldklubben 1903 before moving abroad to play for Scottish club Rangers F.C. as the first professional player in Danish football history. With Rangers, he won four Scottish championships. Hansen played seven games and scored three goals for the Denmark national football team, and was a part of the Denmark team at the 1920 Summer Olympics. As a coach, he managed a number of Danish teams and won the Danish championship with AB.

Skoma'r was a nickname he got after his father's profession as a shoemaker (da:Skomager), and he was most commonly known in Denmark as Carl Skoma'r. He was the older brother of Danish international Henry Hansen.

== Playing career ==
=== Club career ===
Born in Copenhagen, Hansen made himself an early reputation as a dangerous striker in the Copenhagen club Boldklubben 1903 (B 1903), playing in the amateur-only Danish championship from 1915 to 1921. He helped B 1903 win the first Danish championship in club history in 1920. B 1903 played professional Scottish side Rangers F.C. at Idrætsparken in the spring of 1921. The Danes lost although the match 2–1, but Rangers were impressed by the Danes. In particular, they were impressed by Hansen, who was notable for his excellent attacking play and the attitude of a dignified professional. In autumn 1921, Hansen signed a contract with Rangers and became the first Danish professional footballer in the history of Danish football. He cost Rangers a fee of twenty pounds.

Hansen was very popular in Glasgow, and was referred to as "The Great Little Dane" and "The Little Shoemaker", and was the first foreigner who scored in an Old Firm match. He helped Rangers win the Scottish championship in 1923, 1924 and 1925. His stay in Scotland, however, was relatively short. A broken leg ended his career after only four seasons with Rangers. When he returned to Denmark, he served a mandatory two-year quarantine, before he was allowed by the Danish Football Association to play amateur football in Denmark once again. He played one season for his old club B 1903, until he retired in 1928.

=== International career ===
Hansen made his debut for the Denmark national football team in June 1918. As a B 1903 player, he was included in the Danish team for the 1920 Summer Olympics in Antwerp, but he did not play any games at the tournament.

Moving to Rangers spelled the end of Hansen's national team career, as the Danish Football Association did not allow professionals to play for the national team until 1971. Because of this rule, Hansen only played seven matches and scored three goals, including two goals in his debut against Sweden. In October 1918, he scored his third and last goal when Denmark beat Norway 4–0.

== Refereeing ==
During his two-year quarantine in Denmark, Carl Skoma'r officiated several league matches in the 1926–27 KBUs A-række, including B 1908 versus KFUMs BK on 10 October 1926 at Sundby Idrætspark and Valby BK against BK Borup on 14 November 1926 at Fælleden.

== Coaching career ==
He trained the junior team of AB with great success in the 1930s; a team including later Danish international Knud Lundberg. Hansen coached the senior AB team to the 1937 Danish championship, before he returned to B 1903. He joined B 1903 as a professional trainer, at a time when it was customary in Danish football for the coach to work as an amateur. He coached the club from 1943 to 1948.

In 1952, Hansen was asked to train the Denmark national football team at the 1952 Summer Olympics in Helsinki, but he was not allowed to travel with the team for the tournament. Denmark reached the quarter-finals of the 1952 Olympics. He coached BK Frem in 1962.

== Concentration camp ==
During the World War II, Hansen was arrested in 1943 and sentenced to four months imprisonment for having harassed a German. He spent four months in prison and in a German concentration camp in Neumünster. This later affected his nervous system greatly.

== Honours ==
- Danish championship: 1920, 1937
- Scottish Cup: 1923, 1924, 1925
