= Billy McCandless =

Northern Irish footballer and manager (1894–1955)

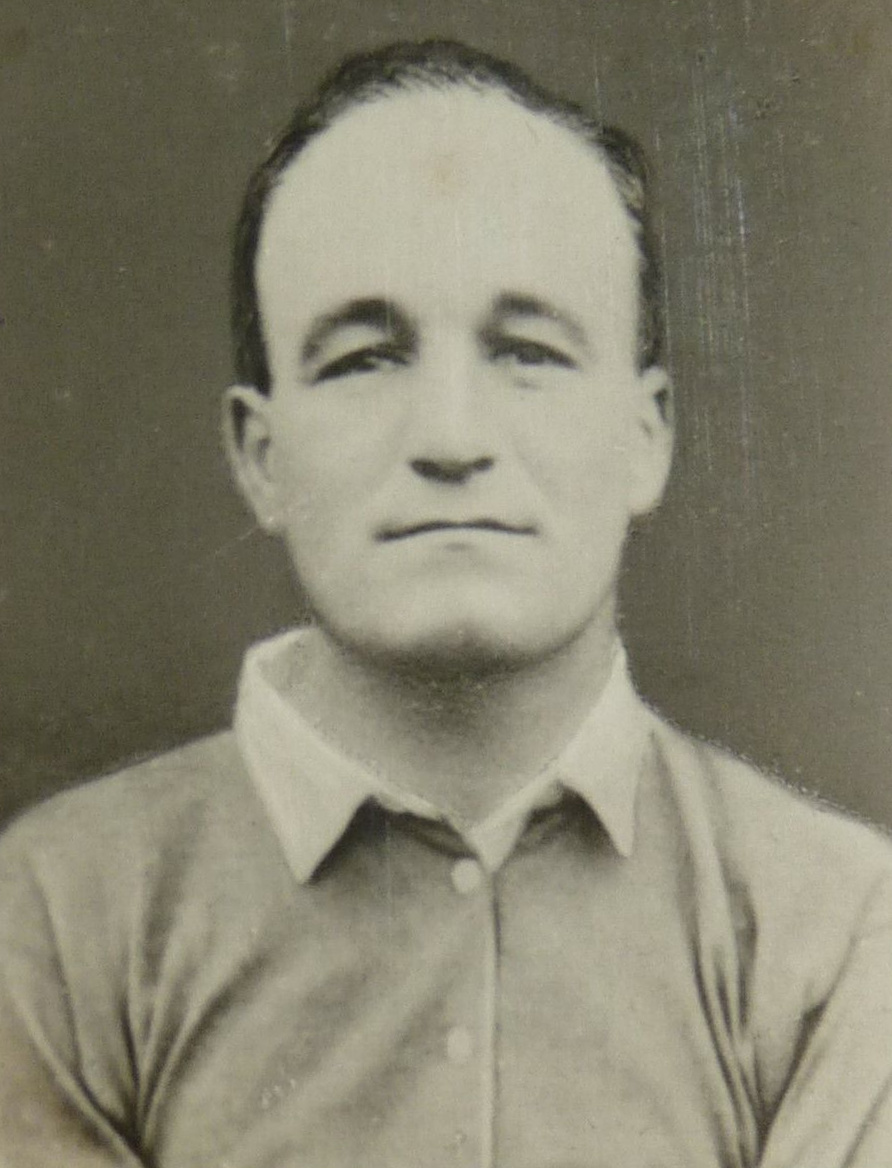
- McCandless c. 1922

Personal information
- Full name: William McCandless
- Date of birth: 20 December 1893
- Place of birth: Craigs, County Antrim, Ireland
- Date of death: 18 July 1955 (aged 61)
- Place of death: Swansea, Wales
- Height: 5 ft 7 in (1.70 m)
- Position: Left-back

Senior career*
| Years | Team | Apps | (Gls) |
| 1914–1920 | Linfield | | |
| 1920–1930 | Rangers | 202 | (8) |
| 1930–1933 | Ballymena | | |

International career
| 1919 | Ireland (wartime) | 1 | (0) |
| 1919 | Irish League XI | 2 | (0) |
| 1919–1929 | Ireland | 9 | (0) |

Managerial career
- 1930–1933: Ballymena
- 1933–1937: Dundee
- 1937–1946: Newport County
- 1946–1947: Cardiff City
- 1947–1955: Swansea City
- * Club domestic league appearances and goals

William McCandless (20 December 1893 – 18 July 1955) was an Irish international football player and manager. As a player McCandless normally played at left-back, most notably at Rangers where he won six Scottish Football League titles with the side. Following his retirement from playing he went into management, enjoying most success with Welsh sides Newport County, Cardiff City and Swansea Town, taking all three sides to the Division Three South title.

== Club career ==
McCandless was born in Craigs near Ballymena, and grew up in Ahoghill, County Antrim, the son of John McCandless, a grocer, and Matilda (née Eyre), a dressmaker.

He started his career with non-league sides Ligoniel and Barn before joining Linfield in 1914. He stayed with the Blues for six years, helping them to Irish Cup success in 1916 and 1919 before his performance in a 2–0 defeat to England while playing for Ireland prompted a number of British sides to show interest in signing him. Eventually joining Rangers in 1920 for £2,500, a record fee for an Irish player at the time, he went on to add six Scottish Football League titles to his honours collection while playing at Ibrox where he formed a formidable full back pairing with another Irishman, Bert Manderson.

In 1930, by then a veteran, McCandless was given the opportunity to move into football management by Ballymena, where he was appointed player-manager. He returned to Scotland in 1933 to take charge of Dundee before moving to Newport County in 1937, where he helped them to promotion to Division 2 in 1939 despite using just 13 players throughout the season. Following the end of the war the majority of his title winning team moved to different clubs and, after falling out with the board over the future of the team, he resigned.

He was a man who lived for football and Welsh soccer has sustained a severe loss in the death of this Irishman who did so much for it. Billy Mac will be mourned by the soccer public everywhere.

— Western Mail

A month later he was appointed Cardiff City manager in 1946 and took the side to the Division Three South title in his first year finishing nine points clear of second place Queens Park Rangers but, after only a few months of the following season, he left to join local rivals Swansea Town. At the club he completed a unique treble, having taken three Welsh sides to the Division Three South title.

He died suddenly on 18 July 1955 at his home in Swansea, while still the club's manager.

== International career ==
McCandless won his first Ireland cap on 25 October 1919 in the first post-war international, a 1–1 draw with England. He went on to win a total of 9 caps for Ireland, making his final appearance on 2 February 1929 in a 2–2 draw with Wales.

== Honours ==
=== Player ===
Linfield Swifts

- Steel And Sons Cup: 1915/16

Linfield

- Irish Cup: 1916, 1919
- County Antrim Shield: 1917

Rangers

- Scottish League: 1921, 1923, 1924, 1925, 1927, 1928

=== Manager ===
Newport County

- Football League Third Division South: 1938–39

Cardiff City

- Football League Third Division South: 1946–47

Swansea Town

- Football League Third Division South: 1948–49
