= Geordie Henderson =

Scottish footballer

Personal information
- Full name: George Donald Henderson
- Date of birth: 15 April 1897
- Place of birth: Forfar, Scotland
- Date of death: 14 June 1953 (aged 56)
- Place of death: Scotland
- Position: Centre forward

Senior career*
Years	Team	Apps	(Gls)
–1919	Forfar Athletic		
1919	Dundee	7	(0)
1919–1927	Rangers	170	(123)
1927	Darlington	14	(6)
1927–1928	New York Nationals	32	(11)
1928–1930	Dundee United	69	(22)
- Rhyl

International career
1923	Scottish Football League XI	1	(1)
- * Club domestic league appearances and goals

George Donald Henderson (15 April 1897 – 14 June 1953) was a Scottish footballer who played professionally in Scotland and briefly in the United States, England and Wales. Playing as a centre forward, he saw his greatest success with Rangers in the 1920s but was never capped by Scotland despite an excellent club scoring record.

== Football career ==
Henderson was born in Forfar and began his professional career with hometown club Forfar Athletic. Towards the end of the 1910s, he played briefly with Dundee before joining Rangers in November 1919.

His debut with Rangers came in a league match on 20 March 1920 against Aberdeen and his first goal came a fortnight later on 3 April against Airdrieonians. Henderson was top scorer at Rangers for four consecutive seasons from 1921–22 until 1924–25 (the latter season being his most productive, netting 32 times). He played a total of 195 first class games (170 league, 25 Scottish Cup) and scored 142 goals (123 league and 19 cup). During his eight-year spell at Rangers he amassed four Scottish League championships, four Glasgow Cups and two Charity Cups. Although he did not represent Scotland, he played once for the Scottish Football League XI.

He left Rangers to join English Second Division club Darlington in January 1927, where he made 14 appearances, scoring six goals as Darlington ended the season in 21st place and were relegated to the Third Division North. In the autumn of 1927, he left Britain and signed with the New York Nationals of the American Soccer League. The Nationals finished third in league play, but won the 1928 National Challenge Cup in a two-game final against the Bricklayers and Masons F.C. of Chicago. The first game ended in a 1–1 tie after extra time, but the Nationals, on the strength of two Henderson goals, won the replay 3–0. In 1928, Henderson returned to Scotland where he signed with Dundee United. He spent only two seasons there, winning the 1928–29 Second Division championship, before transferring to Welsh club Rhyl in the Birmingham and District League.

After his retirement he owned a pub in Dundee.

== Honours ==
Rangers

- Scottish League Division One: 1920–21, 1922–23, 1923–24, 1924–25

New York Nationals

- National Challenge Cup: 1928

Dundee United

- Scottish League Division Two: 1928–29
