= Hector Lawson =

Scottish footballer

Personal information
- Full name: Hector Stewart Ramsey Lawson
- Date of birth: 21 May 1896
- Place of birth: Shettleston, Scotland
- Date of death: 1971 (aged 74–75)
- Height: 5 ft 8 in (1.73 m)
- Positions: Half back; outside forward

Senior career*
Years	Team	Apps	(Gls)
1916–1920	Rangers	38	(4)
1917–1918	→ Third Lanark (loan)		
1917–1918	→ Hamilton Academical (loan)		
1918–1919	→ Clyde (loan)		
1919–1920	Vale of Leven		
1920–1922	Rangers	4	(0)
1922	Third Lanark		
1922–1923	Rangers	5	(0)
1923–1925	Liverpool	12	(0)
1925–1926	Airdrieonians		
1926–1928	Aberdeen	24	(0)
1928–1929	Brighton & Hove Albion	7	(0)
1929–1931	Newport County	55	(1)
- Shamrock Rovers
- * Club domestic league appearances and goals

Hector Stewart Ramsey Lawson (21 May 1896 – 1971) was a Scottish footballer who played as a half back or outside forward in both the Scottish and English Football Leagues.

He was described by the Derby Daily Telegraph as "an outside left who has already made a deep impression, and has speed, ball control, and confidence". He played for a number of clubs including Rangers, Liverpool, Aberdeen and Shamrock Rovers. Born in Shettleston, Lawson played under Bill Struth at Rangers, during the 20th century.
