= Andy Cunningham (footballer) =

Scottish footballer (1891–1973)

Personal information
- Full name: Andrew Cunningham
- Date of birth: 31 January 1891
- Place of birth: Galston, Scotland
- Date of death: 8 May 1973 (aged 82)
- Place of death: Glasgow, Scotland
- Position: Inside forward

Youth career
- 1906–1907: Galston Riverside Rangers

Senior career*
| Years | Team | Apps | (Gls) |
| 1907–1909 | Newmilns | | |
| 1909–1915 | Kilmarnock | 184 | (74) |
| 1915–1928 | Rangers | 350 | (162) |
| 1928–1931 | Newcastle United | 15 | (1) |
| Total | | 549 | (237) |

International career
| 1912–1928 | Scottish League XI | 10 | (1) |
| 1915 | SFL XI (wartime) | 1 | (0) |
| 1920–1927 | Scotland | 12 | (5) |

Managerial career
- 1930–1935: Newcastle United
- 1937–1940: Dundee
- * Club domestic league appearances and goals

Andrew Cunningham (31 January 1891 – 8 May 1973) was a Scottish football player and manager. He played for Kilmarnock, Rangers, Newcastle United and Scotland; his position was inside forward.

== Playing career ==
Born in Galston, Ayrshire, Cunningham began his career with local Junior side Newmilns before moving to Kilmarnock in 1909. After six seasons at Rugby Park he joined Rangers in 1915. He made his Rangers debut on 5 April 1915 in a 1–0 defeat to Partick Thistle, and made five appearances in his first season at Ibrox. Cunningham served as a lieutenant in the Royal Field Artillery during the First World War.

Cunningham continued to be used infrequently by manager William Wilton before establishing himself in the Rangers team in 1918–19. He won seven League titles and played in Rangers' famous 1928 Scottish Cup Final triumph where they defeated Celtic 4–0 to win the trophy for the first time in 25 years. In total, he made 389 League and Scottish Cup appearances and scored 183 goals for the Govan club.

Cunningham was also capped at international level, playing 12 times for Scotland and scoring five goals; he lost just one of his matches for Scotland. Cunningham also represented the Scottish League XI 10 times.

== Managerial career ==
Cunningham moved to Newcastle United in 1928, becoming the then oldest player to make his debut in the English football League at the age of thirty-eight. He began his Newcastle career as player/manager and then went on to become full-time manager of the club after retiring from playing. Technically, he was the first true manager of the club, as his predecessor Frank Watt had no control over team selection.

He guided the club to FA Cup success in 1932 after beating Arsenal 2–1 in the final. However, the club was also relegated to the Second Division whilst he was at the helm. Cunningham eventually left the club in 1935. He is remembered as a moderately successful manager of the club, having won 105 games out of 251.

After his time with Newcastle, he returned to Scotland where he managed Dundee between 1937 and 1940 before becoming a sports writer after World War II.

== Personal life ==
His younger brother William was also a footballer who played as a defender; the siblings were teammates at Kilmarnock for four seasons up to 1915, though William's career ended then after he qualified as a physician.

== Honours ==
Rangers

- Scottish League: 1918–19, 1919–20, 1920–21, 1922–23, 1923–24, 1924–25, 1926–27, 1927–28
- Scottish Cup: 1927–28
  - Runner-up 1920–21, 1921–22
- Glasgow Cup: 1921–22, 1922–23, 1923–24, 1924–25

Newcastle United

- FA Cup: 1931–32

== See also ==
- List of footballers in Scotland by number of league appearances (500+)
- List of footballers in Scotland by number of league goals (200+)
- List of Scotland national football team captains
- List of Scottish football families
