= Alan Morton =

Scottish footballer

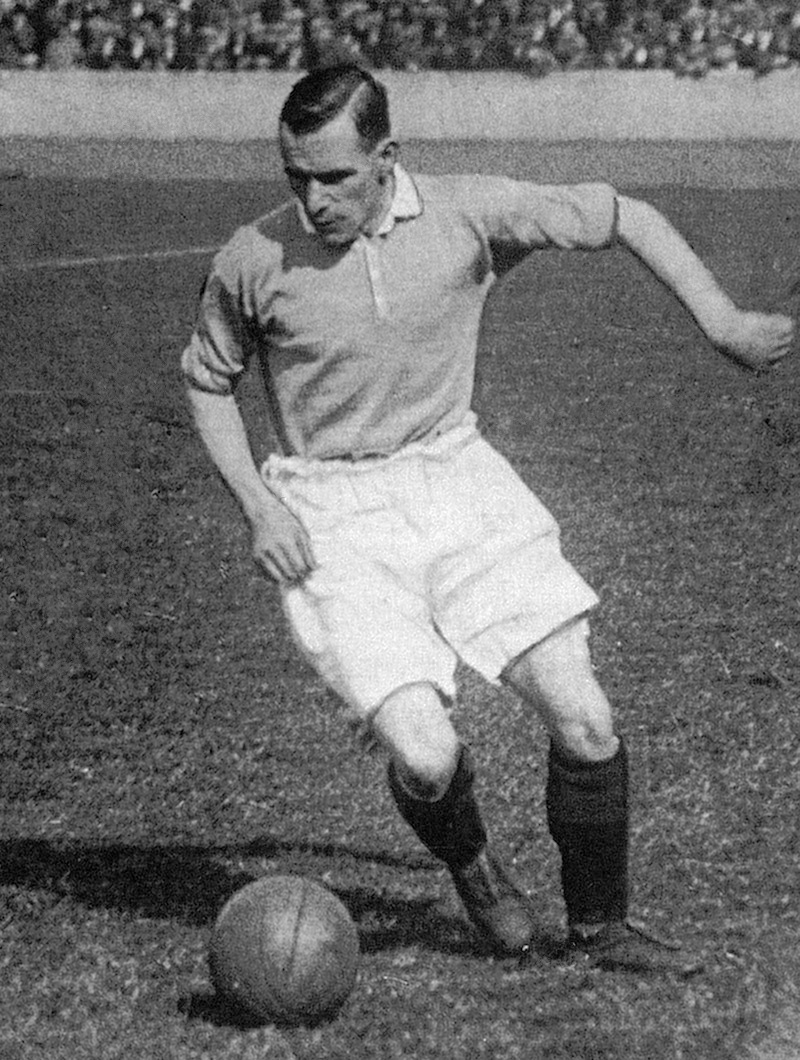

Personal information
- Full name: Alan Lauder Morton
- Date of birth: 24 April 1893
- Place of birth: Glasgow, Scotland
- Date of death: 12 December 1971 (aged 78)
- Place of death: Airdrie, Scotland
- Position: Outside left

Senior career*
Years	Team	Apps	(Gls)
1913–1920	Queen's Park	218	(46)
1920–1933	Rangers	382	(83)

International career
1915–1917	Scottish League (wartime)	3	(0)
1918–1919	Scotland (wartime)	4	(1)
1919–1931	Scottish League XI	15	(1)
1920–1932	Scotland	31	(5)
- * Club domestic league appearances and goals

Alan Lauder Morton (24 April 1893 – 12 December 1971) was a Scottish footballer who played as an outside left for Queen's Park, Rangers and Scotland.

== Playing career ==
=== Club ===
Morton was born in the Jordanhill district of Glasgow. He grew up in Airdrie, where his family relocated due to his father's work. After leaving Airdrie Academy he had an unsuccessful trial with Airdrieonians. Consequently, he entered studies to become a mining engineer while playing with Queen's Park, the famous amateur club. Once fully qualified in 1920 he turned professional, becoming Bill Struth's first signing as manager of Rangers, but only on the proviso that he could maintain his position as a mining engineer.

Morton only measured 5 ft 4 inches in height but his talent lay in his physical balance, speed and thought. Rangers enjoyed a sustained period of success, winning the Scottish league championship in 1921, 1923, 1924, 1925, 1927, 1928, 1929, 1930 and 1931. Highlights included the 1928 Scottish Cup Final win against Celtic, which ended a 25‑year wait to win the Scottish Cup.

He made his debut for Rangers against Airdrieonians on 17 August 1920, and played his last game against the same opposition on 7 January 1933 (in which he scored). "The Wee Blue Devil", as he was nicknamed, played 470 times for the Gers and scored 109 goals.

=== International ===
Morton made his international debut for Scotland on 26 February 1920 against Wales. He would go on to play in every international against the Auld Enemy, England, from 1920 to 1932 bar the fixture at Old Trafford in 1926, eventually winning 31 caps. It was in the 1928 full international in London where Morton, as part of an underrated Scottish side that beat England 5–1 in driving rain to record a famous triumph, earned the moniker: "Wembley Wizards". Three of Morton's crosses were converted by Huddersfield Town's Alex Jackson. Ivan Sharpe, the ex‑player and writer, commented on the victory: "England were not merely beaten. They were bewildered – run to a standstill, made to appear utterly inferior by a team whose play was as cultured and beautiful as I ever expect to see."

In addition he made 15 appearances (scoring 1 goal) for the Scottish League XI (making his debut on 22 February 1919 against the Football League at St. Andrew's, Birmingham after playing in three wartime fundraising matches) and four Scotland wartime appearances (a charity match and three Victory Internationals).

== Retirement ==
After retiring Morton became an important administrator within Scottish sport. He was appointed to the Rangers board of directors and he remained there until the year of his death. Further afield, he demonstrated an inclination toward Unionist politics in reaction to the rise in post-War Scottish nationalism. He also owned a coal business in central Scotland. Today a portrait of Morton in his Scottish strip stands at the top of the marble staircase at Ibrox's Main Stand, such is his enduring stature at the club.

== Personal life ==
His elder brother Bob Morton also played for Queen's Park, where the siblings were teammates for six seasons.

== Honours ==
Scottish League: (9)

- 1920–21, 1922–23, 1923–24, 1924–25, 1926–27, 1927–28, 1928–29, 1929–30, 1930–31

Scottish Cup: (3)

- 1927–28, 1929–30, 1931–32

Glasgow Cup: (5)

- 1922–23, 1923–24, 1924–25, 1929–30, 1931–32

== See also ==
- List of footballers in Scotland by number of league appearances (500+)
- List of Scotland national football team captains
- List of Scotland wartime international footballers
- List of Scottish football families
