= Tommy Muirhead =

Scottish footballer and manager

Personal information
- Full name: Thomas Allan Muirhead
- Date of birth: 24 January 1897
- Place of birth: Cowdenbeath, Scotland
- Date of death: 27 May 1979 (aged 82)
- Place of death: Helensburgh, Scotland
- Positions: Forward; wing half

Senior career*
Years	Team	Apps	(Gls)
–	Hearts of Beath		
1915–1917	Hibernian	29	(3)
1917–1924	Rangers	154	(23)
1924	Boston Soccer Club	14	(0)
1924–1930	Rangers	137	(15)
Total		334	(41)

International career
1921–1924	Scottish League XI	5	(0)
1922–1929	Scotland	8	(0)

Managerial career
- 1924: Boston Soccer Club
- 1931–1936: St Johnstone
- 1936–1937: Preston North End
- * Club domestic league appearances and goals

Thomas Allan Muirhead (24 January 1897 – 27 May 1979) was a Scottish footballer who played for Hibernian, Rangers and Scotland.

== Playing career ==
=== Hibernian and Rangers ===
Muirhead, a forward who was occasionally deployed as a half-back, was signed by Rangers for £20 from Hibernian in May 1917. He made his debut against his former club in a 3–0 win at Ibrox on 15 September 1917, although he did not become a regular until the following season.

=== American Soccer League ===
Muirhead's Rangers career was interrupted by a brief stint in the US in 1925. Cash-rich American Soccer League club Boston Soccer Club lured him across the Atlantic to assume the role of player-manager. However, despite the presence of several other Scots, including internationalists such as Alex McNab and Barney Battles, he could not settle in Boston and returned to Glasgow after only 14 games.

=== Return to Scotland ===
Muirhead returned to Rangers where he played until 1930. He scored 46 goals in 349 overall appearances for Rangers and won eight Scottish Football League championship medals (he never won the Scottish Cup, playing in the lost finals of 1921 and 1929, but not in the long-awaited win of 1928). He was also captain of the club for a spell.

=== International ===
Muirhead was capped at international level, making eight appearances for Scotland. He captained Scotland in a 1–0 defeat against Ireland on 25 February 1928.

== Managerial career ==
After his playing career, Muirhead had further spells in management with St Johnstone (1931–36) and Preston North End (1936–37) and he also worked as a sports journalist.

== See also ==
- List of Scotland national football team captains
