= Tommy Cairns =

Scottish footballer

Personal information
- Date of birth: 30 October 1892
- Place of birth: Hamilton, Scotland
- Date of death: 30 November 1967 (aged 75)
- Place of death: Larkhall, Scotland
- Position: Inside right

Senior career*
| Years | Team | Apps | (Gls) |
- Burnbank Athletic
| 19??–1911 | Larkhall Thistle | | |
| 1911–1912 | Bristol City | 11 | (1) |
| 1912–1913 | Peebles Rovers | | |
| 1913 | St Johnstone | 11 | (1) |
| 1913–1927 | Rangers | 407 | (138) |
| 1927–1932 | Bradford City | 135 | (32) |

International career
| 1919 | Scotland (wartime) | 1 | (0) |
| 1920–1925 | Scotland | 8 | (1) |
| 1922–1926 | Scottish League XI | 6 | (0) |
- * Club domestic league appearances and goals

Thomas Cairns (30 October 1892 – 30 November 1967) was a Scottish footballer who played for Bristol City, Peebles Rovers, St Johnstone, Rangers, Bradford City and Scotland.

== Career ==
=== Club ===
Born in Merryton, Lanarkshire, Cairns made his name in Junior football, helping Burnbank Athletic to the Scottish Junior Cup in 1911. He also appeared for Larkhall Thistle before earning an opportunity in the senior leagues. His first professional club was Bristol City, where he played for two seasons from 1911. He joined Peebles Rovers in 1913 and had a short spell with St Johnstone before joining Rangers in November 1913. He made his debut against Hamilton Academical on 27 December 1913 and played a total of nine games in his first season as Rangers finished second to rivals Celtic in Division One.

Cairns was a regular in the Rangers team the following season, missing just one league game. He continued to be a regular in the team for the next two seasons but it was in season 1917–18 that he won his first League title (Rangers' first for five years). Cairns was an ever-present and scored 11 goals.

Cairns enjoyed further League title successes in 1919–20, 1920–21, 1922–23, 1923–24, 1924–25 and 1926–27 before joining Bradford City. His final Rangers appearance was in a 2–1 win over Queen's Park on 1 March 1927. In his time with Bradford he made 135 appearances and won a Football League Division Three North winner's medal in 1929. He retired from football in 1932 and later worked as a scout for Arsenal.

=== International ===
Cairns was also capped at international level, making eight Scotland appearances. He made his international debut in a British Home Championship match against Wales on 26 February 1920 and he scored in a 1–1 draw. During his international career, he was never on the losing side, winning six games and drawing two. His final international appearance was on 4 April 1925 in a 2–0 win over England at Hampden Park. Cairns also represented the Scottish League XI.

== Personal life ==
Two of Cairns's brothers played football at Junior level, with Hugh winning the Scottish Junior Cup in 1908 and John claiming the same trophy as a teammate of Tommy in 1911.
