= David Meiklejohn =

Scottish footballer and manager

Davie Meiklejohn
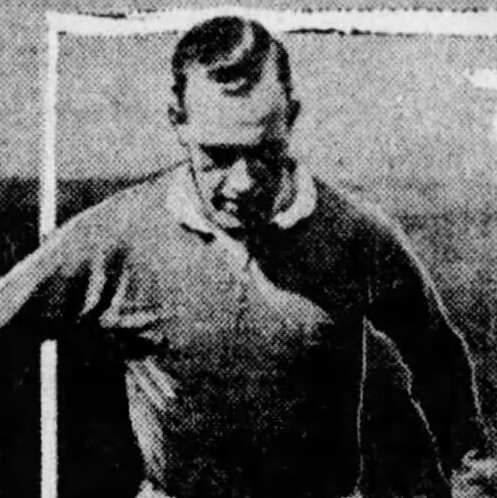

Personal information
- Full name: David Ditchburn Meiklejohn
- Date of birth: 12 December 1900
- Place of birth: Govan, Scotland
- Date of death: 22 August 1959 (aged 58)
- Place of death: Airdrie, Scotland
- Positions: Centre-half; right half

Senior career*
| Years | Team | Apps | (Gls) |
| – | Maryhill | | |
| 1919–1936 | Rangers | 490 | (42) |

International career
| 1921–1932 | Scottish League XI | 6 | (0) |
| 1922–1933 | Scotland | 15 | (3) |

Managerial career
- 1947–1959: Partick Thistle
- * Club domestic league appearances and goals

David Ditchburn Meiklejohn (/ˈmiːkəlˌdʒɒn/; 12 December 1900 – 22 August 1959) was a Scottish professional footballer, who played for Rangers and Scotland during the 1920s and 1930s. He later managed Partick Thistle for 12 years.

== Career ==
Born in Govan, Glasgow, Meiklejohn joined Rangers from junior club Maryhill in 1919 and spent the rest of his playing days with the Ibrox club.

He played 563 games, scoring 46 goals and winning 13 Scottish league championships, five Scottish Cups and eight Glasgow Cups. The first of the Scottish Cups, a 4–0 victory over Celtic in 1928 (in which he scored a penalty) was perhaps the most important psychologically as it broke a sequence of 25 winless years in the competition for Rangers. Three years earlier he had escaped serious injury when involved in a bus crash on Copland Road near to Ibrox Park.

On 5 September 1931, he captained the Rangers side in the Old Firm game which saw the Celtic goalkeeper John Thomson accidentally killed contesting for a ball with Rangers' Sam English. Meiklejohn was credited with having realised the seriousness of the situation and gestured to calm the home support whilst the injured Thomson was being attended to. He stepped in and performed a reading at Thomson's funeral when Celtic's Peter Wilson could not gain access to the church due to the crowd that had gathered outside.

He was capped 15 times by Scotland during an 11-year international career. He scored three times and captained the side six times. He made his debut against Wales. Meiklejohn also represented the Scottish League XI six times.

Meiklejohn retired from football in 1936 and took a job with the Daily Record newspaper. In 1947 he became manager of Partick Thistle, and was credited with maintaining a strong level of play while also introducing several young talents into the team.

He collapsed and died, aged 58, in the director's box at Broomfield Park, home of Airdrieonians. On 15 November 2009 he was inducted into the Scottish Football Hall of Fame.

== See also ==
- List of one-club men in association football
- List of Scotland national football team captains
