= Bert Manderson =

Irish footballer (1893–1946)

Personal information
- Full name: Robert Manderson
- Date of birth: 9 May 1893
- Place of birth: Belfast, Ireland
- Date of death: 27 April 1946 (aged 52)
- Place of death: Glasgow, Scotland
- Height: 5 ft 11 in (1.80 m)
- Position: Right-back

Senior career*
Years	Team	Apps	(Gls)
- Cliftonville
1913–1914	Belfast Celtic		
1914	Glenavon		
1914–1927	Rangers	370	(5)
1927–1928	Bradford Park Avenue		

International career
1920–1926	Ireland	5	(0)
- * Club domestic league appearances and goals

Robert Manderson (9 May 1893 – 27 April 1946) was an Irish footballer who played as a right-back for Rangers and Ireland.

== Playing career ==
Manderson made his Rangers debut in a 1–1 draw with Aberdeen on 27 March 1915. He had joined Rangers from Glenavon for £150. He previously had spells at Cliftonville and Belfast Celtic. He went on to make 370 league appearances (452 in total) in 12 seasons with the club, winning seven Scottish league titles. Manderson left Rangers to join Bradford Park Avenue in 1927.

He was also capped at international level by Ireland.

== Coaching career ==
Manderson was trainer of Queen's Park from at least 1929 until his death.

== Death ==
He died on 27 April 1946, aged 52.
