= Sandy Archibald =

Scottish footballer and manager

Personal information
- Full name: Alexander Archibald
- Date of birth: 23 November 1896
- Place of birth: Crossgates, Scotland
- Date of death: 29 November 1946 (aged 50)
- Place of death: Crossgates, Fife, Scotland
- Position: Outside right

Senior career*
Years	Team	Apps	(Gls)
- Dunfermline Juniors
1916–1917	Raith Rovers	35	(4)
1917–1934	Rangers	513	(126)
1934–1935	Raith Rovers	5	(1)
Total		553	(131)

International career
1918	Scotland (wartime)	1	(1)
1919–1933	Scottish League XI	12	(1)
1921–1932	Scotland	8	(1)

Managerial career
- 1934–1939: Raith Rovers
- 1939–1946: Dunfermline
- * Club domestic league appearances and goals

Alexander Archibald (23 November 1896 – 29 November 1946) was a Scottish footballer, who played for Raith Rovers, Rangers and Scotland. He was later secretary/manager of Raith and Dunfermline Athletic.

== Playing career ==
=== Club ===
Initially employed as a miner in Fife, Archibald became a full professional when he joined Rangers at the age of 19 from Raith Rovers in 1917. He made his debut in a 2–0 defeat to Old Firm rivals Celtic in the Glasgow Merchants Charity Cup final in May 1917. The following season he was an ever-present as Rangers won the League title for the first time in five seasons.

Archibald went on to win thirteen league titles in his seventeen seasons with the Glasgow club. He also won three Scottish Cup medals, the first of which in 1928 was Rangers' first in 25 years and Archibald scored twice in the final as Rangers defeated Celtic 4–0 at Hampden. His final appearance was in a 1–1 draw away to Queen's Park on 30 April 1934. He made 625 appearances for Rangers in all competitions.

=== International ===
Archibald won a total of 8 caps for Scotland over an 11-year period, although most of his selections occurred between his 1921 debut and 1924. After a seven-year hiatus, he earned a recall for the matches against England in 1931 and 1932. He scored once for his country, against Wales in February 1922. Archibald also played for the Scottish League XI.

== Managerial career ==
After his playing retirement he rejoined Raith Rovers as secretary/manager, a role he held for over five years. He joined the Kirkcaldy side's Fife rivals Dunfermline in October 1939 and performed a similar combined managerial role for them until his death in 1946.

== See also ==
- List of footballers in Scotland by number of league appearances (500+)
