= List of Rangers F.C. international footballers =

Map showing the countries Rangers players have represented in international matches

This is a list of past and present Rangers F.C. players who have been capped by their country whilst at the club.

Fifty-six nations, former and present, have played international matches with teams featuring Rangers players. Rangers have had players take part in matches governed by all continental federations (UEFA, CONCACAF, CONMEBOL, CAF, AFC, and the OFC).

Players in bold are still at the club.

== Current national teams ==
=== Albania ===
Rangers F.C. Albanian international footballers (Albania)
Player name	Date of first cap	Date of last cap	Number of caps
Eros Grezda	10 October 2018	25 March 2019	6
**Nedim Bajrami**	7 September 2024	31 March 2026	17

=== Algeria ===
Rangers F.C. Algerian international footballers (Algeria)
Player name	Date of first cap	Date of last cap	Number of caps
Madjid Bougherra	20 August 2008	23 June 2010	20
Brahim Hemdani	31 May 2008		1

=== Argentina ===
Rangers F.C. Argentine international footballers (Argentina)
Player name	Date of first cap	Date of last cap	Number of caps
Claudio Caniggia	13 February 2002	28 March 2002	2

=== Australia ===
Rangers F.C. Australian international footballers (Australia)
Player name	Date of first cap	Date of last cap	Number of caps
Dave Mitchell	12 June 1980	31 October 1993	2
Craig Moore	21 June 1995	29 March 2004	30
Tony Vidmar	6 July 1997	25 November 2001	27
Matt McKay	2 September 2011	15 November 2011	6

=== Belgium ===
Rangers F.C. Belgian international footballers (Belgium)
Player name	Date of first cap	Date of last cap	Number of caps
Thomas Buffel	4 June 2005	16 August 2006	5
**Nicolas Raskin**	20 March 2025	31 March 2026	11

=== Bosnia and Herzegovina ===
Rangers F.C. Bosnian international footballers (Bosnia and Herzegovina)
Player name	Date of first cap	Date of last cap	Number of caps
Saša Papac	2 September 2006	28 February 2012	10

=== Burkina Faso ===
Rangers F.C. Burkinabe international footballers (Burkina Faso)
Player name	Date of first cap	Date of last cap	Number of caps
**Nasser Djiga**	14 November 2025	31 March 2026	3

=== Canada ===
Rangers F.C. Canadian international footballers (Canada)
Player name	Date of first cap	Date of last cap	Number of caps
Fraser Aird	13 October 2015	11 October 2016	2
Scott Arfield	9 September 2018	15 November 2019	7
**Derek Cornelius**	5 September 2025	31 March 2026	7
Colin Miller	16 October 1984	10 May 1986	5

=== Chile ===
Rangers F.C. Chilean international footballers (Chile)
Player name	Date of first cap	Date of last cap	Number of caps
Sebastián Rozental	15 December 1996	8 October 2000	9

=== Colombia ===
Rangers F.C. Colombian international footballers (Colombia)
Player name	Date of first cap	Date of last cap	Number of caps
Alfredo Morelos	7 September 2018	20 June 2021	11

=== Croatia ===
Rangers F.C. Croatian international footballers (Croatia)
Player name	Date of first cap	Date of last cap	Number of caps
Dado Pršo	5 June 2004	22 June 2006	21
Nikica Jelavić	3 September 2010	15 November 2011	11
Borna Barišić	6 September 2018	15 October 2023	32

=== Curaçao ===
Rangers F.C. Curaçaoan international footballers (Curaçao)
Player name	Date of first cap	Date of last cap	Number of caps
Juninho Bacuna	6 October 2021	9 October 2021	2

=== Czech Republic ===
Rangers F.C. Czech international footballers (Czech Republic)
Player name	Date of first cap	Date of last cap	Number of caps
Libor Sionko	30 May 2006	24 March 2007	8
Václav Černý	10 September 2024	25 March 2025	7

=== Denmark ===
Rangers F.C. Danish international footballers (Denmark)
Player name	Date of first cap	Date of last cap	Number of caps
Jan Bartram			
Erik Bo Andersen	19 June 1996		1
Jesper Christiansen	6 March 2002		1
Brian Laudrup	17 August 1994	28 June 1998	33
Peter Løvenkrands	27 March 2002	1 March 2006	13

=== Ecuador ===
Rangers F.C. Ecuadorian international footballers (Ecuador)
Player name	Date of first cap	Date of last cap	Number of caps
**José Cifuentes**	7 September 2023	12 June 2024	5

=== Egypt ===
Rangers F.C. Egyptian international footballers (Egypt)
Player name	Date of first cap	Date of last cap	Number of caps
Mohamed Latif			

=== England ===
Rangers F.C. English international footballers (England)
Player name	Date of first cap	Date of last cap	Number of caps
Terry Butcher	10 September 1986	4 July 1990	32
Paul Gascoigne	6 September 1995	26 June 1996	22
Mark Hateley	25 March 1992		1
Trevor Steven	25 April 1990	6 February 1991	5
Gary Stevens	14 September 1988	3 June 1992	20
Mark Walters	3 June 1991		1
Chris Woods	12 November 1986	12 June 1991	20

=== Finland ===
Rangers F.C. Finnish international footballers (Finland)
Player name	Date of first cap	Date of last cap	Number of caps
**Oliver Antman**	7 September 2025	30 March 2026	7
Jonatan Johansson	20 August 1997	3 June 2000	20
Antti Niemi	6 September 1997	4 September 1999	17
Glen Kamara	23 March 2019	19 June 2023	43

=== France ===
Rangers F.C. French international footballers (France)
Player name	Date of first cap	Date of last cap	Number of caps
Jean-Alain Boumsong	17 November 2004		1

=== Gabon ===
Rangers F.C. Gabonese international footballers (Gabon)
Player name	Date of first cap	Date of last cap	Number of caps
Daniel Cousin	8 September 2007	19 August 2008	2

=== Georgia ===
Rangers F.C. Georgian international footballers (Georgia (country))
Player name	Date of first cap	Date of last cap	Number of caps
Shota Arveladze	1 September 2001	26 March 2005	12
Zurab Khizanishvili	11 June 2003	27 February 2006	17

=== Germany ===
Rangers F.C. German international footballers (Germany)
Player name	Date of first cap	Date of last cap	Number of caps
Jörg Albertz	5 September 1998		1

=== Greece ===
Rangers F.C. Greek international footballers (Greece)
Player name	Date of first cap	Date of last cap	Number of caps
Sotirios Kyrgiakos	9 February 2005	25 May 2006	15

=== Honduras ===
Rangers F.C. Honduran international footballers (Honduras)
Player name	Date of first cap	Date of last cap	Number of caps
Arnold Peralta	11 October 2013	18 November 2014	7

=== Iceland ===
Rangers F.C. Icelandic international footballers (Iceland)
Player name	Date of first cap	Date of last cap	Number of caps
Thor Beck	5 July 1965		1

=== Israel ===
Rangers F.C. Israeli international footballers (Israel)
Player name	Date of first cap	Date of last cap	Number of caps
Avi Cohen	9 January 1988	17 February 1988	3
Boni Ginzburg	15 October 1989	30 October 1989	2

=== Ivory Coast ===
Rangers F.C. Ivorian international footballers (Ivory Coast)
Player name	Date of first cap	Date of last cap	Number of caps
**Mohamed Diomande**	7 June 2024	10 June 2025	8

=== Jamaica ===
Rangers F.C. Jamaican international footballers (Jamaica)
Player name	Date of first cap	Date of last cap	Number of caps
Kemar Roofe	5 September 2021	12 November 2021	5

=== Lithuania ===
Rangers F.C. Lithuanian international footballers (Lithuania)
Player name	Date of first cap	Date of last cap	Number of caps
Andrius Velička	15 October 2008	17 November 2010	6
Marius Žaliūkas	8 September 2014	27 March 2015	2

=== Mali ===
Rangers F.C. Malian international footballers (Mali)
Player name	Date of first cap	Date of last cap	Number of caps
Lassana Coulibaly	16 October 2018	28 June 2019	7

=== Malta ===
Rangers F.C. Maltese international footballers (Malta)
Player name	Date of first cap	Date of last cap	Number of caps
Myles Beerman	6 June 2017	26 March 2018	2

=== Mauritania ===
Rangers F.C. Mauritanian international footballers (Mauritania)
Player name	Date of first cap	Date of last cap	Number of caps
Djeidi Gassama	27 March 2026		1

=== Morocco ===
Rangers F.C. Moroccan international footballers (Morocco)
Player name	Date of first cap	Date of last cap	Number of caps
Hamza Igamane	21 March 2025		1

=== Nigeria ===
Rangers F.C. Nigerian international footballers (Nigeria)
Player name	Date of first cap	Date of last cap	Number of caps
Sone Aluko	16 June 2012		1
Joe Aribo	10 September 2019	9 June 2022	18
Leon Balogun	9 October 2020	29 March 2022	11
Calvin Bassey	25 March 2022	13 June 2022	6
Cyriel Dessers	22 March 2024	31 May 2025	4
**Emmanuel Fernandez**	27 March 2026	31 March 2026	2

=== Netherlands ===
Rangers F.C. Dutch international footballers (Netherlands)
Player name	Date of first cap	Date of last cap	Number of caps
Ronald de Boer	2 September 2000	13 February 2002	4
Pieter Huistra	17 April 1991	11 September 1991	3
Bert Konterman	16 June 2000	2 September 2000	2
Arthur Numan	27 May 1998	19 May 2002	16
Fernando Ricksen	15 November 2000	30 April 2003	12
Giovanni van Bronckhorst	18 November 1998	7 October 2000	14

=== Northern Ireland ===
Rangers F.C. Northern Irish international footballers (Northern Ireland)
Player name	Date of first cap	Date of last cap	Number of caps
Steven Davis	26 March 2008	27 September 2022	61
David Healy	9 February 2011	2 June 2012	9
Lee Hodson	4 September 2016	3 June 2018	8
Gareth McAuley	18 November 2018		1
Kyle Lafferty	11 October 2008	11 June 2019	19
Andrew Little	28 March 2009	7 September 2012	9
John McClelland	3 June 1981	16 October 1984	25
Jimmy Nicholl	24 May 1983	12 June 1986	11
Dean Shiels	15 August 2012	14 November 2012	4
Jordan Jones	8 June 2019	30 May 2021	5
Billy Simpson	1951	1958	12
**Ross McCausland**	17 November 2023	8 September 2024	5

=== North Macedonia ===
Rangers F.C. North Macedonian international footballers (North Macedonia)
Player name	Date of first cap	Date of last cap	Number of caps
**Bojan Miovski**	7 September 2025	26 March 2026	6

=== Norway ===
Rangers F.C. Norwegian international footballers (Norway)
Player name	Date of first cap	Date of last cap	Number of caps
**Thelo Aasgaard**	4 September 2025	16 November 2025	5
Henning Berg	20 August 2003	27 May 2004	5
Tore André Flo	24 March 2001	17 April 2002	8

=== Poland ===
Rangers F.C. Polish international footballers (Poland)
Player name	Date of first cap	Date of last cap	Number of caps
Dariusz Adamczuk	18 August 1999		1

=== Portugal ===
Rangers F.C. Portuguese international footballers (Portugal)
Player name	Date of first cap	Date of last cap	Number of caps
Pedro Mendes	10 October 2009	14 October 2009	2
Bruno Alves	9 June 2017	7 June 2018	7

=== Romania ===
Rangers F.C. Romanian international footballers (Romania)
Player name	Date of first cap	Date of last cap	Number of caps
Daniel Prodan	5 December 2000		1
Dorin Goian	2 September 2011	4 June 2013	12
Ianis Hagi	4 September 2020	24 March 2025	37

=== Russia ===
Rangers F.C. Russian international footballers (Russia)
Player name	Date of first cap	Date of last cap	Number of caps
Andrei Kanchelskis	19 August 1998	5 September 1998	2

=== Scotland ===
Rangers F.C. Scottish international footballers (Scotland)
Player name	Date of first cap	Date of last cap	Number of caps
Charlie Adam	30 May 2007	6 June 2007	2
Sandy Archibald	12 February 1921	9 April 1932	8
Sammy Baird	21 November 1956	15 June 1958	7
John Barker	18 March 1893	24 March 1894	2
**Connor Barron**	9 June 2025		1
Jim Baxter	9 November 1960	21 October 1964	23
Alex Bennett	1 March 1909	15 March 1913	8
Jim Bett	23 March 1982	15 December 1982	2
Ian Black	15 August 2012		1
James Bowie	13 March 1920	10 April 1920	2
Kris Boyd	11 May 2006	3 March 2010	16
Ralph Brand	9 November 1960	2 May 1962	8
Kirk Broadfoot	10 September 2008	11 August 2010	4
Bobby Brown	27 November 1946	18 October 1952	4
George Brown	25 October 1930	21 May 1938	19
John Buchanan	13 April 1929	5 April 1930	2
Chris Burke	11 May 2006	13 May 2006	2
Tommy Cairns	26 February 1920	4 April 1925	8
Eric Caldow	6 April 1957	6 April 1963	40
John Cameron	20 March 1886		1
John Campbell	18 March 1899	23 February 1901	4
Peter Campbell	23 March 1878	7 April 1879	2
William Chalmers	14 March 1885		1
Davie Cooper	12 September 1979	26 May 1987	20
Sammy Cox	23 May 1948	3 April 1954	25
Tully Craig	26 February 1927	5 April 1930	8
David Crawford	3 February 1900		1
Jason Cummings	27 March 2018		1
Andy Cunningham	13 March 1920	2 April 1927	12
**Findlay Curtis**	28 May 2026		1
Christian Dailly	30 May 2008		1
Ally Dawson	28 May 1980	19 June 1983	5
Jerry Dawson	20 October 1934	15 April 1939	14
Matthew Dickie	27 March 1897	3 February 1900	3
Billy Dodds	29 March 2000	5 September 2001	11
Jock Drummond	31 March 1894	21 March 1903	13
Jimmy Duncanson	27 November 1946		1
Gordon Durie	23 March 1994	23 June 1998	18
Ian Durrant	9 September 1987	17 November 1993	11
Barry Ferguson	5 September 1998	28 March 2009	35
Derek Ferguson	22 March 1988	17 May 1988	2
Ian Ferguson	22 December 1988	11 February 1997	9
Jimmy Fleming	1 June 1929	5 April 1930	3
Jim Forrest	24 November 1965	7 December 1965	2
Tom Forsyth	17 October 1973	11 June 1978	21
Jimmy Galt	7 March 1908	14 March 1908	2
Neilly Gibson	30 March 1895	2 March 1901	13
George Gillespie	27 March 1880	22 March 1890	5
Andy Goram	11 September 1991	25 March 1998	28
Jimmy Gordon	16 March 1912	10 April 1920	10
James Gossland	26 January 1884		1
Richard Gough	17 February 1988	28 April 1993	27
Donald Gow	17 March 1888		1
John Gow	24 March 1888		1
Dougie Gray	27 October 1928	26 October 1932	10
John Greig	11 April 1964	29 October 1975	44
David Haddow	7 April 1894		1
Robert C. Hamilton	18 March 1899	26 March 1904	27
Tom Hamilton	9 April 1932		1
Charles Heggie	20 March 1886		1
George Henderson	26 March 1904		1
Willie Henderson	20 October 1962	21 April 1971	29
Colin Hendry	23 March 1994	17 November 1999	10
David Hill	12 March 1881	25 March 1882	3
Alan Hutton	30 May 2007	17 November 2007	6
Tommy Hyslop	3 April 1897		1
John Inglis	10 March 1883	12 March 1883	2
Colin Jackson	16 April 1975	15 May 1976	8
Ryan Jack	9 November 2017	19 November 2023	18
Sandy Jardine	11 November 1970	19 December 1979	38
Allan Johnston	7 October 2000	28 March 2001	3
Mo Johnston	11 October 1989	13 November 1991	10
Willie Johnston	13 October 1965	11 November 1970	9
Derek Johnstone	12 May 1973	19 December 1979	14
**Liam Kelly**	31 May 2026		1
Stewart Kennedy	16 April 1975	24 May 1975	5
David Kinnear	8 December 1937		1
George Law	5 March 1910	2 April 1910	3
John Little	6 May 1953		1
George Livingstone	4 March 1907		1
Thomas Low	27 March 1897		1
Alex MacDonald	7 April 1976		1
Bobby Main	30 October 1937		1
James Marshall	9 April 1932	14 April 1934	3
Robert Marshall	19 March 1892	31 March 1894	2
John May	3 March 1906	1 March 1909	5
Bob McAuley	19 September 1931	31 October 1931	2
Stuart McCall	11 September 1991	25 March 1998	29
Neil McCann	31 March 1999	12 February 2003	15
Peter McCloy	12 May 1973	30 June 1973	4
Ally McCoist	29 April 1986	7 September 1997	59
Ian McColl	15 April 1950	19 April 1958	14
Andrew McCreadie	18 March 1893	7 April 1894	2
Lee McCulloch	8 September 2007	7 September 2010	6
Allan McGregor	30 May 2007	20 November 2018	25
Hugh McHardy	14 March 1885		1
Hugh McIntyre	27 March 1880		1
James "Tuck" McIntyre	29 March 1884		1
Barrie McKay	4 June 2016		1
Bobby McKean	7 April 1976		1
Tom McKillop	21 May 1938		1
Ronnie McKinnon	9 November 1965	14 June 1971	28
Alan McLaren	16 November 1994	15 November 1995	10
Ian McMillan	14 May 1961		1
Moses McNeil	25 March 1876	13 March 1880	2
Bob McPhail	27 October 1928	10 November 1937	16
Dave McPherson	12 June 1992	28 April 1993	7
John McPherson	26 March 1892	27 March 1897	5
David Meiklejohn	4 February 1922	29 November 1933	15
Jimmy Millar	3 April 1897	2 April 1897	3
Jimmy Millar	8 May 1963	9 June 1963	2
Kenny Miller	25 April 2001	12 October 2010	15
David Mitchell	29 March 1890	7 April 1894	5
Alan Morton	9 April 1921	8 May 1932	29
Tommy Muirhead	4 March 1922	26 October 1929	8
Jamie Murphy	23 March 2018	30 May 2018	2
Ian Murray	8 October 2005	13 May 2006	3
Steven Naismith	9 September 2009	11 October 2011	14
Robert Neil	3 February 1900		1
Jimmy Oswald	20 March 1897		1
Nathan Patterson	6 June 2021	12 November 2021	6
Derek Parlane	12 May 1973	28 May 1977	12
David Provan	12 October 1963	11 May 1966	5
Gavin Rae	31 March 2004	13 May 2006	3
Willie Reid	6 March 1911	4 April 1914	9
Billy Ritchie	2 May 1962		1
William Robb	31 October 1925		1
David Robertson	19 February 1992	23 March 1994	3
John Tait Robertson	3 February 1900	6 March 1905	14
Maurice Ross	16 May 2002	19 November 2003	12
Eddie Rutherford	23 May 1948		1
Alex Scott	7 November 1956	2 May 1962	11
Jock Shaw	23 January 1946	4 October 1947	6
Bobby Shearer	15 April 1961	14 May 1961	4
Jimmy Simpson	20 October 1934	10 November 1937	14
Alex Smith	2 April 1898	1 April 1911	20
Dave Smith	30 May 1968		1
Jimmy Smith	20 October 1934	10 November 1937	2
Nicol Smith	3 April 1897	3 May 1902	12
**John Souttar**	8 June 2022	31 March 2026	18
Finlay Speedie	9 March 1903	4 April 1903	3
Jimmy Speirs	7 March 1908		1
James Stark	15 March 1909	3 April 1909	2
Colin Stein	16 October 1968	2 July 1972	17
Scot Symon	7 December 1938		1
Steven Thompson	12 February 2003	13 October 2004	9
Kevin Thomson	20 August 2008	3 March 2010	2
Willie Thornton	15 May 1946	30 May 1952	8
Tom Vallance	3 March 1877	14 March 1881	7
Alex Venters	4 April 1936	15 April 1939	2
Willie Waddell	15 May 1946	3 Nov 1954	18
John Walker	12 March 1904	26 March 1904	2
Lee Wallace	26 May 2012	22 March 2017	5
James Watson	23 March 1878		1
David Weir	24 March 2007	12 October 2010	17
Steven Whittaker	12 August 2009	26 May 2012	15
Davie Wilson	22 October 1960	27 May 1965	22
Willie Woodburn	12 April 1947	30 April 1952	24
Thomas Wyllie	29 March 1890		1
George Young	15 May 1946	19 May 1957	54

=== Slovakia ===
Rangers F.C. Slovakian international footballers (Slovakia)
Player name	Date of first cap	Date of last cap	Number of caps
Filip Šebo	15 August 2006	16 October 2007	7
Vladimír Weiss	3 September 2010	9 February 2011	4

=== South Africa ===
Rangers F.C. South African international footballers (South Africa)
Player name	Date of first cap	Date of last cap	Number of caps
Johnny Hubbard			
Don Kitchenbrand			
Bongani Zungu	13 November 2020	16 November 2020	2

=== Sweden ===
Rangers F.C. Swedish international footballers (Sweden)
Player name	Date of first cap	Date of last cap	Number of caps
Joachim Björklund	14 August 1996	2 June 1998	15
Örjan Persson	1 June 1967	25 June 1970	10
Robert Prytz	6 October 1982	22 May 1985	17
Jonas Thern	6 August 1997	10 September 1997	4
Filip Helander	18 November 2019	24 March 2022	9

=== Switzerland ===
Rangers F.C. Swiss international footballers (Switzerland)
Player name	Date of first cap	Date of last cap	Number of caps
Cedric Itten	7 October 2020	15 November 2021	5

=== Trinidad and Tobago ===
Rangers F.C. Trinidadian international footballers (Trinidad and Tobago)
Player name	Date of first cap	Date of last cap	Number of caps
Marvin Andrews	30 May 2004	3 June 2006	26

=== Tunisia ===
Rangers F.C. Tunisian international footballers (Tunisia)
Player name	Date of first cap	Date of last cap	Number of caps
Hamed Namouchi	26 March 2005	16 August 2006	18
Bilel Mohsni	28 May 2014	10 September 2014	4

=== Turkey ===
Rangers F.C. Turkish international footballers (Turkey)
Player name	Date of first cap	Date of last cap	Number of caps
Tugay Kerimoğlu	23 February 2000	6 June 2001	7
Ridvan Yilmaz	22 March 2024		1

=== Ukraine ===
Rangers F.C. Ukrainian international footballers (Ukraine)
Player name	Date of first cap	Date of last cap	Number of caps
Oleg Kuznetsov	28 October 1992		1
Alexei Mikhailichenko	28 October 1992	12 October 1994	2

=== United States ===
Rangers F.C. American international footballers (United States)
Player name	Date of first cap	Date of last cap	Number of caps
DaMarcus Beasley	22 August 2007	23 June 2010	25
Carlos Bocanegra	2 September 2011	14 November 2012	16
Maurice Edu	20 August 2008	15 August 2012	31
Claudio Reyna	13 June 1999	7 October 2001	20
Malik Tillman	23 September 2022	27 September 2022	2

=== Wales ===
Rangers F.C. Welsh international footballers (Wales)
Player name	Date of first cap	Date of last cap	Number of caps
Declan John	22 March 2018	28 May 2018	3
Rabbi Matondo	6 June 2024	9 June 2025	4
Aaron Ramsey	24 March 2022		1

=== Zambia ===
Rangers F.C. Zambian international footballers (Zambia)
Player name	Date of first cap	Date of last cap	Number of caps
Fashion Sakala	7 October 2021	17 June 2023	10

== Former national teams ==
=== Commonwealth of Independent States ===
Rangers F.C. Commonwealth of Independent State international footballers (Commonwealth of Independent States)
Player name	Date of first cap	Date of last cap	Number of caps
Oleksiy Mykhaylychenko	29 April 1992	18 June 1992	5
Oleh Kuznetsov	19 February 1992	18 June 1992	5

=== Ireland ===
See Ireland national football team (1882–1950) for details of this national team.

Rangers F.C. Irish international footballers (Ireland)
Player name	Date of first cap	Date of last cap	Number of caps
Alex Craig	15 February 1908	15 March 1909	4
Robert J. Hamilton	25 February 1928	19 September 1931	5
Sam English	17 September 1932	7 December 1932	2
Bert Manderson	13 March 1920	27 February 1926	4
Billy McCandless	9 April 1921	2 February 1929	6
Whitey McDonald	22 February 1930	17 October 1931	2
Alex Stevenson (Note: Stevenson represented both of the Ireland teams, operated by the Irish Football Association and the Football Association of Ireland, during his career – he only played for the IFA team while at Rangers.)	16 September 1933	4 November 1933	3

=== Serbia and Montenegro ===
Rangers F.C. Serbian international footballers (Serbia and Montenegro)
Player name	Date of first cap	Date of last cap	Number of caps
Dragan Mladenović	11 July 2004	15 August 2005	9
Gordan Petrić	12 June 1997	16 June 1997	3

=== Soviet Union ===
Rangers F.C. Soviet international footballers (Soviet Union)
Player name	Date of first cap	Date of last cap	Number of caps
Oleh Kuznetsov	12 September 1990	13 November 1991	7
Oleksiy Mykhaylychenko	28 August 1991	13 November 1991	4
