= List of Rangers F.C. players =

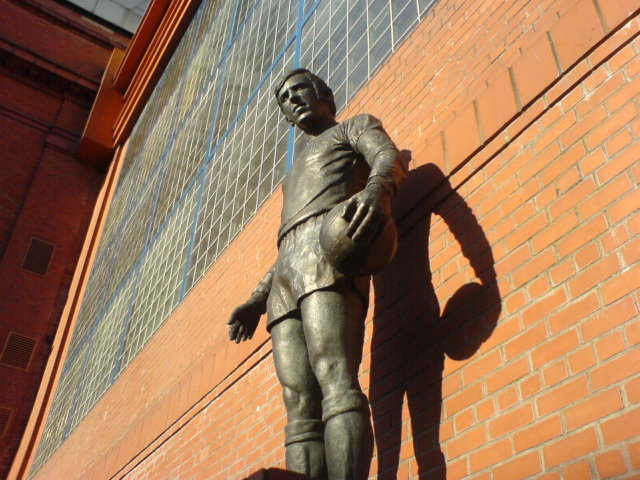
Statue of John Greig, holder of Rangers' record for most appearances made for the club

This is a list of notable footballers who have played for Rangers.

The list includes all players that have appeared in one hundred or more first-team (league, Scottish Cup, Scottish League Cup, Scottish Challenge Cup or European competition) matches for the club which totals 243 current and former players. Further to this, a player can also be included where they are regarded as having played a significant role for the club (e.g. players involved in the 1971–72 Cup Winners' Cup campaign or have been named club captain), but the reason for their inclusion should be indicated in the Notes column. All Rangers Hall of Fame members are denoted by an emboldened name.

For a full list of all Rangers players with Wikipedia articles see Category:Rangers F.C. players. For player appearance records see Rangers F.C. records.

Players should be listed according to the date they first signed with the club. Appearances and goals are for competitive first-team matches only; wartime matches are excluded. Substitute appearances included.

== Notable players ==
- Appearances and goals are for first-team competitive matches only, including Scottish league, Scottish Football League, Scottish Cup, League Cup, Challenge Cup, European Cup/Champions League, UEFA Cup/Europa League, Cup Winners' Cup, Inter-Cities Fairs Cup and Super Cup.

Positions key
Pre-1960s		Post-1960s	
GK	Goalkeeper		
FB	Full back	DF	Defender
HB	Half back	MF	Midfielder
FW	Forward		
U	Utility player^{1}		

Players who represented their country while at the club.

As of 12 September 2026

Name	Nationality	Position	Rangers career	Appearances	Goals	Notes
Moses McNeil	Scotland	HB	1872–1882	34	10	
Peter McNeil	Scotland	HB	1872–1877	7	0	
William McBeath	Scotland	HB	1872–1876	5	0	
Peter Campbell	Scotland	FW	1872–1879	24	15	
Tom Vallance	Scotland	FB	1874–1884	38	0	
David Mitchell	Scotland	HB	1889–1900	171	8	
Robert Marshall	Scotland	HB	1889–1896	125	4	
Andrew McCreadie	Scotland	FB	1890–1894; 1896–1897	109	11	
John McPherson	Scotland	FW	1891–1902	281	121	
Jock Drummond	Scotland	FB	1892–1904	223	6	
Nicol Smith	Scotland	FB	1893–1905	205	6	
Alex Smith	Scotland	FW	1894–1915	481	152	
Neilly Gibson	Scotland	HB	1894–1904	192	22	
Matthew Dickie	Scotland	GK	1896–1904	175	0	
Robert Neil	Scotland	FB	1897–1904	109	28	
Robert C. Hamilton	Scotland	FW	1897–1906; 1907–1908	209	184	
Jacky Robertson	Scotland	FB	1899–1905	130	25	
Finlay Speedie	Scotland	FW	1900–1906	121	50	
James Stark	Scotland	FB	1900–1907; 1908–1910	213	14	
John May	Scotland	FB	1904–1910	149	16	
Archie Kyle	Scotland	FW	1904–1908	110	52	
Alex Craig	Ireland	FB	1904–1914; 1916–1917	160	0	
George Law	Scotland	FB	1906–1912; 1916–1917	111	1	
Joe Hendry	Scotland	FB	1909–1917	147	7	
Robert Campbell	Scotland	U	1906–1914	211	56	
James Galt	Scotland	HB	1906–1914	206	5	
Jimmy Gordon	Scotland	FB	1907–1920	334	65	
Alex Bennett	Scotland	FW	1908–1917	201	53	
Billy Hogg	England	FW	1909–1913	107	45	
Herbert Lock	England	GK	1909–1920	238	0	
Willie Reid	Scotland	FW	1909–1920	230	195	
James Bowie	Scotland	FW	1910–1922	321	66	
Jimmy Paterson	Scotland	HB	1910–1920	168	41	
John Hempsey	Scotland	GK	1912–1919	150	0	
James Logan	Scotland	FB	1912–1917	118	8	
Tommy Cairns	Scotland	FW	1913–1927	457	154	
Scott Duncan	Scotland	FW	1913–1919	103	26	
Andy Cunningham	Scotland	FW	1914–1929	389	182	
Peter Pursell	Scotland	FB	1914–1919	128	1	
Bert Manderson	Ireland	FB	1915–1927	418	5	
Tommy Muirhead	Scotland	U	1917–1924; 1925–1930	353	49	
Sandy Archibald	Scotland	HB	1917–1934	580	148	
Arthur Dixon	England	FB	1917–1926	361	8	
James Walls	Scotland	HB	1918–1924	106	4	
David Meiklejohn	Scotland	FB	1919–1936	563	46	
Geordie Henderson	Scotland	FW	1919–1927	195	142	
Alan Morton	Scotland	FW	1920–1933	440	105	
Billy McCandless	Ireland	FB	1920–1930	231	9	
William Robb	Scotland	GK	1920–1926	251	0	
Thomas Hamilton	Scotland	GK	1923–1934	281	0	
Tully Craig	Scotland	HB	1923–1935	275	38	
Jimmy Fleming	Scotland	FW	1925–1934	268	223	
James Marshall	Scotland	FW	1925–1934	225	125	
Dougie Gray	Scotland	FB	1925–1946	555	2	
Bob McPhail	Scotland	FW	1927–1940	408	261	
Jimmy Simpson	Scotland	FB	1927–1940	331	6	
Robert J. Hamilton	Ireland	FB	1927–1933	143	0	
John Buchanan	Scotland	FB	1927–1931	115	3	
Whitey McDonald	Ireland	FB	1928–1938	209	1	
George Brown	Scotland	HB	1929–1941	269	23	
Bobby Main	Scotland	HB	1929–1939	158	35	
Jimmy Smith	Scotland	FW	1930–1946	259	249	
Sam English	Ireland	FW	1931–1933	72	64	
Jerry Dawson	Scotland	GK	1931–1945	211	0	
Torrance Gillick	Scotland	FW	1933–1935; 1946–1950	140	62	
Alex Venters	Scotland	FW	1933–1946	201	102	
David Kinnear	Scotland	FW	1934–1944	109	32	
Willie Thornton	Scotland	FW	1936–1954	308	194	
Jock Shaw	Scotland	FB	1938–1953	287	1	
Willie Woodburn	Scotland	FB	1938–1954	329	1	
Jimmy Duncanson	Scotland	FW	1939–1950	140	59	
Willie Waddell	Scotland	FW	1939–1955	301	55	
George Young	Scotland	FB	1941–1957	428	31	
Ian McColl	Scotland	FB	1945–1960	526	14	
Willie Rae	Scotland	HB	1946–1957	179	7	
Sammy Cox	Scotland	FB	1946–1955	340	16	
Bobby Brown	Scotland	GK	1946–1956	296	0	
Eddie Rutherford	Scotland	HB	1946–1952	140	28	
Willie Findlay	Scotland	FW	1947–1954	114	65	
Willie Paton	Scotland	FW	1947–1957	164	68	
Johnny Hubbard	South Africa	FW	1949–1959	238	106	
Billy Simpson	Northern Ireland	FW	1950–1959	239	163	
John Little	Scotland	FB	1950–1961	275	1	
John Prentice	Scotland	FB	1950–1956	142	37	
George Niven	Scotland	GK	1951–1960	327	0	
Derek Grierson	Scotland	FW	1952–1956	106	59	
Eric Caldow	Scotland	DF	1953–1966	407	25	
Alex Scott	Scotland	MF	1954–1963	331	46	
Ralph Brand	Scotland	FW	1954–1965	317	206	
Sammy Baird	Scotland	MF	1955–1960	179	52	
Max Murray	Scotland	FW	1955–1963	154	121	
Bobby Shearer	Scotland	DF	1955–1965	407	4	
Jimmy Millar	Scotland	FW	1955–1967	317	162	
Davie Wilson	Scotland	MF	1956–1967	373	157	
Billy Ritchie	Scotland	GK	1956–1967	339	0	
Harold Davis	Scotland	MF	1956–1964	261	13	
Dave Provan	Scotland	DF	1958–1970	262	11	
Norrie Martin	Scotland	GK	1958–1970	110	0	
Ian McMillan	Scotland	FW	1958–1964	194	55	
Willie Stevenson	Scotland	MF	1958–1962	103	1	
Bill Paterson	Scotland	DF	1958–1962	116	0	
Jim Baxter	Scotland	MF	1960–1965; 1969–1970	254	24	
Willie Henderson	Scotland	MF	1960–1972	426	62	
Ronnie McKinnon	Scotland	DF	1960–1973	473	2	
John Greig	Scotland	DF	1961–1978	755	120	
Jim Forrest	Scotland	FW	1962–1967	163	145	
George McLean	Scotland	FW	1962–1967	117	82	
Colin Jackson	Scotland	DF	1963–1982	506	40	
Willie Johnston	Scotland	MF	1964–1972; 1980–1982	393	125	
Willie Mathieson	Scotland	DF	1964–1975	250	3	
Sandy Jardine	Scotland	DF	1964–1982	674	77	
Kai Johansen	Denmark	DF	1965–1970	238	9	
Dave Smith	Scotland	MF	1966–1974	301	11	
Alex Miller	Scotland	DF	1967–1983	306	30	
Andy Penman	Scotland	MF	1967–1973	150	49	
Örjan Persson	Sweden	MF	1967–1970	113	31	
Colin Stein	Scotland	FW	1968–1973; 1975–1977	206	78	
Alfie Conn, Jr.	Scotland	MF	1968–1974	149	39	
Alex MacDonald	Scotland	MF	1968–1980	503	94	
Derek Johnstone	Scotland	U	1970–1983; 1985–1986	546	210	
Peter McCloy	Scotland	GK	1970–1986	535	0	
Derek Parlane	Scotland	FW	1970–1980	300	111	
Tommy McLean	Scotland	MF	1971–1982	452	57	
Tom Forsyth	Scotland	DF	1972–1982	326	6	
Quinton Young	Scotland	MF	1972–1976	116	38	
Stewart Kennedy	Scotland	GK	1973–1980	131	0	
Bobby McKean	Scotland	MF	1974–1978	119	17	
Ally Dawson	Scotland	DF	1975–1987	316	8	
Gordon Smith	Scotland	U	1977–1980; 1982	157	51	
Bobby Russell	Scotland	MF	1977–1986	270	46	
Davie Cooper	Scotland	MF	1977–1989	540	75	
John MacDonald	Scotland	FW	1978–1986	230	77	
Jim Bett	Scotland	MF	1980–1983	152	30	
Ian Redford	Scotland	MF	1980–1986	247	42	
John McClelland	Northern Ireland	DF	1981–1984	153	8	
Dave McPherson	Scotland	DF	1981–1987; 1992–1994	424	38	
Robert Prytz	Sweden	MF	1982–1985	118	20	
Dave MacKinnon	Scotland	DF	1982–1986	141	2	
Craig Paterson	Scotland	DF	1982–1987	129	12	
Jimmy Nicholl	Northern Ireland	DF	1983–1984; 1986–1989	106	0	
Robert Fleck	Scotland	FW	1983–1987	104	34	
Derek Ferguson	Scotland	MF	1983–1990	145	7	
Stuart Munro	Scotland	DF	1983–1991	233	3	
Ally McCoist	Scotland	FW	1983–1998	581	355	
Ian Durrant	Scotland	MF	1983–1998	347	45	
Scott Nisbet	Scotland	DF	1985–1993	118	9	
Terry Butcher	England	DF	1986–1990	176	11	
Graeme Souness	Scotland	MF	1986–1991	73	5	
Chris Woods	England	GK	1986–1991	230	0	
Ray Wilkins	England	MF	1987–1989	96	3	
Mark Walters	England	MF	1987–1991	143	52	
Richard Gough	Scotland	DF	1987–1997; 1997–1998	427	34	
Gary Stevens	England	DF	1988–1994	246	9	
John Brown	Scotland	DF	1988–1997	278	18	
Ian Ferguson	Scotland	MF	1988–2000	336	46	
Mo Johnston	Scotland	FW	1989–1992	100	46	
Nigel Spackman	England	MF	1989–1993	124	3	
Trevor Steven	England	MF	1989–1991; 1992–1997	184	25	
Mark Hateley	England	FW	1990–1995; 1997	222	115	
Pieter Huistra	Netherlands	MF	1990–1995	158	26	
Alexei Mikhailichenko	Ukraine	MF	1991–1996	134	24	
David Robertson	Scotland	DF	1991–1997	251	19	
Andy Goram	Scotland	GK	1991–1998	260	0	
Stuart McCall	Scotland	MF	1991–1998	265	20	
Charlie Miller	Scotland	MF	1992–1999	115	16	
Gordon Durie	Scotland	FW	1993–2000	171	58	
Craig Moore	Australia	DF	1993–1998; 1999–2005	253	17	
Brian Laudrup	Denmark	MF	1994–1998	150	45	
Paul Gascoigne	England	MF	1995–1998	103	39	
Alec Cleland	Scotland	DF	1995–1998	133	7	
Barry Ferguson	Scotland	MF	1996–2003; 2005–2009	431	61	
Jörg Albertz	Germany	MF	1996–2001	182	82	
Sergio Porrini	Italy	DF	1997–2001	133	7	
Tony Vidmar	Australia	DF	1997–2002	159	11	
Lorenzo Amoruso	Italy	DF	1997–2003	224	24	
Maurice Ross	Scotland	DF	1997–2005	108	3	
Bob Malcolm	Scotland	U	1997–2006	115	3	
Giovanni van Bronckhorst	Netherlands	MF	1998–2001	118	22	
Rod Wallace	England	FW	1998–2001	122	56	
Andrei Kanchelskis	Russia	MF	1998–2002	113	19	
Neil McCann	Scotland	MF	1998–2003	171	25	
Arthur Numan	Netherlands	DF	1998–2003	176	6	
Stefan Klos	Germany	GK	1998–2007	298	0	
Michael Mols	Netherlands	FW	1999–2004	147	48	
Bert Konterman	Netherlands	U	2000–2003	117	9	
Kenny Miller	Scotland	FW	2000–2001; 2008–2011; 2014–2018	301	116	
Ronald de Boer	Netherlands	MF	2000–2004	129	40	
Peter Løvenkrands	Denmark	FW	2000–2006	182	54	
Fernando Ricksen	Netherlands	U	2000–2006	254	20	
Tore André Flo	Norway	FW	2000–2002	72	38	
Shota Arveladze	Georgia	FW	2001–2005	132	57	
Allan McGregor	Scotland	GK	2001–2012; 2018–2023	505	0	
Alan Hutton	Scotland	DF	2002–2008	122	4	
Chris Burke	Scotland	MF	2002–2009	131	14	
Steven Smith	Scotland	DF	2004–2010; 2013–2015	111	5	
Dado Pršo	Croatia	FW	2004–2007	124	37	
Nacho Novo	Spain	FW	2004–2010	255	71	
Brahim Hemdani	Algeria	MF	2005–2009	108	2	
Kris Boyd	Scotland	FW	2005–2010; 2014–2015	235	138	
David Weir	Scotland	DF	2007–2012	231	5	
Saša Papac	Bosnia and Herzegovina	DF	2006–2012	227	7	
Steven Whittaker	Scotland	DF	2007–2012	209	28	
Steven Davis	Northern Ireland	MF	2008–2012; 2019–2023	370	28	
Lee McCulloch	Scotland	U	2007–2015	303	70	
Kevin Thomson	Scotland	MF	2007–2010	109	3	
Steven Naismith	Scotland	FW	2007–2012	140	33	
Kirk Broadfoot	Scotland	DF	2007–2012	121	1	
Kyle Lafferty	Northern Ireland	FW	2008–2012; 2018–2019	168	44	
Madjid Bougherra	Algeria	DF	2008–2011	113	5	
Maurice Edu	United States	MF	2008–2012	125	12	
Lee Wallace	Scotland	DF	2011–2019	257	25	
Barrie McKay	Scotland	FW	2012–2017	140	20	
Ian Black	Scotland	MF	2012–2015	115	8	
Dean Shiels	Northern Ireland	MF	2012–2016	124	31	
Nicky Law	England	MF	2013–2016	122	26	
Nicky Clark	Scotland	FW	2013–2016	107	24	
Danny Wilson	Scotland	DF	2009–2010; 2015–2018	107	5	
Wes Foderingham	England	GK	2015–2020	143	0	
James Tavernier	England	DF	2015–2026	565	144	
Jason Holt	Scotland	MF	2015–2020	116	14	
Andy Halliday	Scotland	MF	2015–2020	152	18	
Alfredo Morelos	Colombia	FW	2017–2023	269	124	
Ryan Jack	Scotland	MF	2017–2024	210	16	
Connor Goldson	England	DF	2018–2024	309	23	
Scott Arfield	Canada	MF	2018–2023	233	43	
Ryan Kent	England	MF	2018–2023	218	33	
Borna Barišić	Croatia	DF	2018–2024	236	10	
Jermain Defoe	England	FW	2019–2022	74	32	
Glen Kamara	Finland	MF	2019–2023	193	9	
Joe Aribo	Nigeria	MF	2019–2022	149	26	
Ianis Hagi	Romania	MF	2020–2025	130	20	
Calvin Bassey	Nigeria	DF	2020–2022	65	1	
Leon Balogun	Nigeria	DF	2020–2022; 2023–2025	114	3	
Kemar Roofe	Jamaica	FW	2020–2024	102	38	
Scott Wright	Scotland	MF	2021–2024	120	12	
John Lundstram	England	MF	2021–2024	153	11	
John Souttar	Scotland	DF	2022–2026	132	4	
Nicolas Raskin	Belgium	MF	2023–	152	13	
Jack Butland	England	GK	2023–2026	157	0	
Cyriel Dessers	Nigeria	FW	2023–2025	116	52	
Mohamed Diomande	Ivory Coast	MF	2024–2026	122	10	

== Club captains ==
Since the club's formation in 1872, over thirty players have permanently held the position of club captain for Rangers. The first was Tom Vallance, from 1876 to 1882. The longest-serving captain is John Greig, who held the role from 1965 until his retirement in 1978. The current club captain is James Tavernier, who took over from Lee Wallace in 2018.

Although many players have held the position of captain during matches – and in many occasions several matches in a row, when the club captain was injured or suspended – this list only includes players that have been officially appointed as the captain of Rangers.

Name	From	To	Tenure	Notes
(Scotland) Tom Vallance	1876	1882	6 years	First known club captain.
(Scotland) David Mitchell	1882	1894	2 years	First captain to win the Scottish Cup.
(Scotland) John McPherson	1894	1898	4 years	
(Scotland) Robert Hamilton	1898	1906	8 years	
(Scotland) Robert Campbell			4 years	Captain for four years between 1906 and 1916.
(Scotland) Tommy Cairns	1916	1926	10 years	
(Ireland) Bert Manderson	1926	1927	1 year	First non-Scottish captain of the club.
(Scotland) Tommy Muirhead	1927	1930	3 years	
(Scotland) David Meiklejohn	1930	1938	8 years	
(Scotland) Jimmy Simpson	1938	1940	2 years	
(Scotland) Jock Shaw	1940	1957	13 years	
(Scotland) George Young	1953	1957	4 years	
(Scotland) Ian McColl	1957	1960	3 years	
(Scotland) Eric Caldow	1960	1962	2 years	
(Scotland) Bobby Shearer	1962	1965	3 years	
(Scotland) John Greig	1965	1978	13 years	Retired as a footballer to become manager of the club.
(Scotland) Derek Johnstone	1978	1983	5 years	Named captain by Greig after requesting a transfer.
(Northern Ireland) John McClelland	1983	21 September 1984	1 year	Stripped of captaincy in September due to contract talks.
(Scotland) Craig Paterson	21 September 1984	1 August 1986	1 year, 314 days	
(England) Terry Butcher	1 August 1986	23 September 1990	4 years, 53 days	Made captain on day signed, 1 August.
(Scotland) Richard Gough	23 September 1990	31 May 1997	6 years, 255 days	Appointed captain after a row between Souness and Butcher.
(Denmark) Brian Laudrup	1 June 1997	18 October 1997	139 days	First non-British captain of the club.
(Scotland) Richard Gough	18 October 1997	31 May 1998	225 days	Returned to the club in October and was re-appointed captain.
(Italy) Lorenzo Amoruso	1 June 1998	31 October 2000	2 years, 152 days	Appointed by Dick Advocaat and was the club's first Catholic captain.
(Scotland) Barry Ferguson	31 October 2000	29 August 2003	2 years, 302 days	Became captain aged only 22.
(Australia) Craig Moore	3 January 2003	8 July 2004	1 year, 187 days	Removed as captain after disagreement with McLeish.
(Germany) Stefan Klos	17 July 2004	7 July 2005	1 year, 10 days	First goalkeeper captain, Ricksen stood-in after he was injured.
(Scotland) Barry Ferguson	7 July 2005	1 January 2007	1 year, 178 days	Stripped of captaincy by Paul Le Guen.
(Scotland) Gavin Rae	1 January 2007	13 January 2007	12 days	Captained the club for only 13 days.
(Scotland) Barry Ferguson	13 January 2007	30 April 2009	2 years, 80 days	Stripped of captaincy by Walter Smith.
(Scotland) David Weir	3 April 2009	20 January 2012	2 years, 292 days	Made captain on 3 April, having previously been vice captain.
(Northern Ireland) Steven Davis	20 January 2012	6 June 2012	168 days	Stand in at start of 2011–12 season, permanent from 20 January.
(United States) Carlos Bocanegra	29 July 2012	31 August 2012	33 days	Club captain for only seven games.
(Scotland) Lee McCulloch	1 September 2012	31 May 2015	2 years, 272 days	Club captain over three divisions.
(Scotland) Lee Wallace	25 July 2015	6 July 2018	2 years, 346 days	Former VC, became captain from start of season, officially 16 August.
(England) James Tavernier	6 July 2018	31 May 2026	7 years, 329 days	Former VC, then captain from 6 July.
(Scotland) Lawrence Shankland	31 July 2026			

== Hall of Fame players ==
The Rangers Football Club Hall of fame is a list established in 2000 by the then Rangers chairman, David Murray. The club was the first in Britain to establish a Roll of Honour for former players. Murray decided that the club should remember and honour the achievements and contribution made by its finest players throughout its history. A mahogany panel above the famous marble staircase was assigned to display the names of those inducted into the Hall of Fame and an annual presentation ceremony was instigated where the players honoured received their award. The first member elected was Moses McNeil, one of the founders of Rangers.

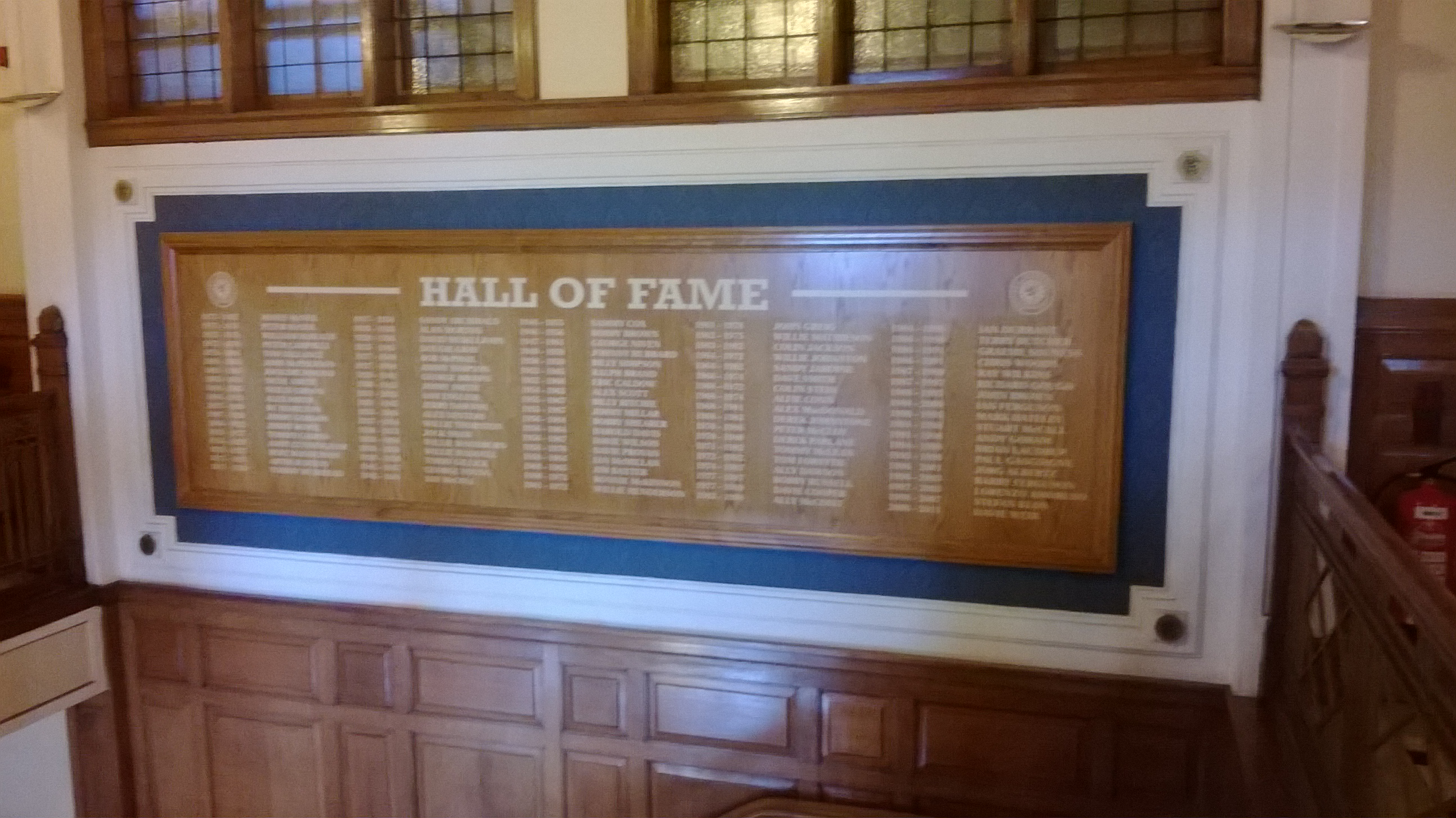
Rangers F.C. Hall of Fame.

The following criteria are considered by the panel when selecting new members:

- the individual's service to the club,
- the number of appearances made,
- the honours won whilst playing for the club,
- international caps won whilst with the club, and
- the player's exceptional ability.

Honours key
League title	Scottish Premiership	Scottish Cup	Scottish Cup
League Cup	Scottish League Cup	Cup Winner's Cup	UEFA Cup Winners' Cup
Second-tier title	Scottish Championship	Third-tier title	Scottish League One
Fourth-tier title	Scottish Third Division	Challenge Cup	Scottish Challenge Cup

#	Inductee	Induction Year	Position	Rangers Career	Appearances	Honours	International Caps
1	(Scotland) Moses McNeil	2000	MF	1872–1882	34	None	2
2	(Scotland) Peter McNeil	2010	MF	1872–1877	7	None	0
3	(Scotland) Peter Campbell	2010	FW	1872–1879	24	None	2
4	(Scotland) William McBeath	2010	MF	1872–1876	5	None	0
5	(Scotland) Tom Vallance		DF	1877–1884	38	None	7
6	(Scotland) John McPherson		FW	1891–1902	281	League title (5); Scottish Cup (3)	9
7	(Scotland) Jock Drummond	2011	DF	1892–1904	225	League title (4), Scottish Cup (4)	14
8	(Scotland) Nicol Smith		DF	1893–1905	205	League title (4), Scottish Cup (3)	12
9	(Scotland) Neilly Gibson	2011	MF	1894–1904	192	League title (4), Scottish Cup (3)	14
10	(Scotland) Alex Smith	2000	MF	1894–1915	481	League title (4)	20
11	(Scotland) RC Hamilton	2011	FW	1897–1906; 1907–1908	209	League title (4), Scottish Cup (2)	11
12	(Scotland) Jimmy Gordon	2007	DF	1907–1920	334	League title (5)	10
13	(Scotland) Jimmy Bowie	2011	MF	1910–1922	351	League title (6)	2
14	(Scotland) Tommy Cairns	2000	MF	1913–1927	457	League title (6)	6
15	(Scotland) Andy Cunningham		FW	1914–1929	389	League title (7), Scottish Cup (1)	12
16	(Ireland) Bert Manderson		DF	1915–1927	218	League title (7)	5
17	(England) Arthur Dixon		DF	1917–1926	393	League title (6)	0
18	(Scotland) Tommy Muirhead		MF	1917–1924; 1925–1930	353	League title (8)	8
19	(Scotland) Sandy Archibald		MF	1917–1934	580	League title (13), Scottish Cup (3)	8
20	(Scotland) David Meiklejohn	2000	DF	1919–1936	563	League title (12), Scottish Cup (5)	15
21	(Scotland) Alan Morton	2000	MF	1920–1933	440	League title (9), Scottish Cup (3)	31
22	(Scotland) Tully Craig	2012	U	1923–1935		League title (5), Scottish Cup (2)	8
23	(Scotland) Dougie Gray		DF	1925–1947	555	League title (10), Scottish Cup (6)	10
24	(Scotland) Jimmy Fleming	2012	FW	1925–1934			3
25	(Scotland) Bob McPhail	2000	FW	1927–1940	408	League title (9), Scottish Cup (6)	16
26	(Scotland) Jimmy Simpson	2011	DF	1927–1941			14
27	(Scotland) George Brown	2010	DF	1929–1941	269	League title (7), Scottish Cup (4)	19
28	(Scotland) Jimmy Smith		FW	1930–1946	259	League title (5), Scottish Cup (3)	2
29	(Scotland) Jerry Dawson	2002	GK	1931–1945	211	League title (5), Scottish Cup (2)	14
30	(Ireland) Sam English	2009	FW	1931–1933	72	League title (1), Scottish Cup (1)	2
31	(Scotland) Torry Gillick		FW	1933–1935; 1946–1950	140	League title (1), Scottish Cup (2), League Cup (2)	5
32	(Scotland) Alex Venters	2006	FW	1933–1946	201	League title (3), Scottish Cup (2)	3
33	(Scotland) Willie Thornton	2000	FW	1936–1954	308	League title (4), Scottish Cup (3), League Cup (2)	4
34	(Scotland) Jock Shaw	2000	DF	1938–1953	287	League title (4), Scottish Cup (3), League Cup (2)	4
35	(Scotland) Willie Woodburn		DF	1938–1954	329	League title (4), Scottish Cup (3), League Cup (2)	24
36	(Scotland) William Waddell	2000	MF	1939–1955	301	League title (4), Scottish Cup (2)	17
37	(Scotland) George Young		DF	1941–1957	428	League title (6), Scottish Cup (4), League Cup (2)	53
38	(Scotland) Ian McColl	c	DF	1945–1960	526	League title (6), Scottish Cup (5), League Cup (2)	14
39	(Scotland) Bobby Brown	2002	GK	1946–1956	296	League title (3), Scottish Cup (3), League Cup (2)	3
40	(Scotland) Sammy Cox	2003	MF	1946–1955	340	League title (3), Scottish Cup (2)	24
41	(Scotland) George Niven	2011	GK	1947–1961	328	League title (5), Scottish Cup (2), League Cup (1)	0
42	(South Africa) Johnny Hubbard	2008	MF	1949–1959	238	League title (3), Scottish Cup (1)	1
43	(Northern Ireland) Billy Simpson	2003	FW	1950–1959	239	League title (3), Scottish Cup (1)	12
44	(Scotland) John Little	2012	DF	1951–1960	275	League title (2), Scottish Cup (2)	1
45	(Scotland) Eric Caldow		DF	1953–1966	407	League title (5), Scottish Cup (2), League Cup (3)	40
46	(Scotland) Alex Scott	2006	MF	1954–1963	331	League title (4), Scottish Cup (1), League Cup (2)	16
47	(Scotland) Ralph Brand	2002	FW	1954–1965	317	League title (4), Scottish Cup (3), League Cup (4)	8
48	(Scotland) Jimmy Millar	2003	FW	1955–1967	317	League title (3), Scottish Cup (4), League Cup (3)	2
49	(Scotland) Bobby Shearer		DF	1955–1965	407	League title (5), Scottish Cup (3), League Cup (4)	4
50	(Scotland) Billy Ritchie	2008	GK	1955–1967	339	League title (2), Scottish Cup (4), League Cup (3)	1
51	(Scotland) Davie Wilson	2003	MF	1956–1967	373	League title (2), Scottish Cup (5), League Cup (2)	22
52	(Scotland) Harold Davis	2009	DF	1956–1964	261	League title (4), Scottish Cup (1), League Cup (2)	0
53	(Scotland) David Provan	2004	DF	1958–1970	262	League title (1), Scottish Cup (3), League Cup (2)	5
54	(Scotland) Ian McMillan	2010	FW	1958–1964	194	League title (2), Scottish Cup (3), League Cup (2)	6
55	(Scotland) Willie Henderson	2002	MF	1960–1972	426	League title (2), Scottish Cup (4), League Cup (2)	29
56	(Scotland) Ronnie McKinnon	2004	DF	1960–1973	473	League title (2), Scottish Cup (4), League Cup (3)	28
57	(Scotland) Jim Baxter	2000	MF	1960–1965; 1969–1970	254	League title (3), Scottish Cup (3), League Cup (4)	34
58	(Scotland) John Greig	2000	DF	1961–1978	755	League title (5), Scottish Cup (6), League Cup (1), Cup Winners' Cup (1)	44
59	(Scotland) Colin Jackson		DF	1963–1982	506	League title (3), Scottish Cup (3), League Cup (5)	8
60	(Scotland) Sandy Jardine	2000	DF	1964–1982	674	League title (3), Scottish Cup (5), League Cup (5), Cup Winners' Cup (1)	34
61	(Scotland) Willie Johnston	2002	MF	1964–1972; 1980–1982	393	Scottish Cup (1), League Cup (2), Cup Winners' Cup (1)	22
62	(Scotland) Willie Mathieson	2007	DF	1964–1975	250	Scottish Cup (1), Cup Winners' Cup (1)	0
63	(Scotland) Dave Smith	2007	DF	1966–1974	301	Cup Winners' Cup (1)	2
64	(Scotland) Alex MacDonald	2003	MF	1968–1980	503	League title (3), Scottish Cup (4), League Cup (4), Cup Winners' Cup (1)	1
65	(Scotland) Colin Stein	2002	FW	1968–1973; 1975–1977	206	League Cup (2), Cup Winners' Cup (1)	21
66	(Scotland) Alfie Conn, Jr.	2007	MF	1968–1974	149	Scottish Cup (1), League Cup (1), Cup Winners' Cup (1)	2
67	(Scotland) Peter McCloy	c	GK	1970–1986	535	League title (1), Scottish Cup (4), League Cup (4), Cup Winners' Cup (1)	4
68	(Scotland) Derek Parlane	2010	FW	1970–1980	300	League title (2), Scottish Cup (2), League Cup (2)	12
69	(Scotland) Derek Johnstone	c	FW	1970–1983; 1985–1986	546	League title (3), Scottish Cup (5), League Cup (5), Cup Winners' Cup (1)	14
70	(Scotland) Tommy McLean	2004	MF	1971–1982	452	League title (3), Scottish Cup (4), League Cup (3), Cup Winners' Cup (1)	9
71	(Scotland) Tom Forsyth	2003	DF	1972–1982	326	League title (3), Scottish Cup (4), League Cup (2)	22
72	(Scotland) Ally Dawson	2011	DF	1975–1987	316	Scottish Cup (2), League Cup (4)	5
73	(Scotland) Davie Cooper	2000	MF	1977–1989	540	League title (3), Scottish Cup (3), League Cup (7)	24
74	(Scotland) Bobby Russell	2006	MF	1977–1986	370	League title (1), Scottish Cup (3), League Cup (4)	0
75	(Scotland) Dave McPherson	2012	DF	1980–1987; 1992–1994	330	League title (3), Scottish Cup (1), League Cup (4)	27
76	(Scotland) Ally McCoist	2000	FW	1983–1998	581	League title (9), Scottish Cup (1), League Cup (9)	61
77	(Scotland) Ian Durrant	2002	MF	1983–1998	347	League title (3), Scottish Cup (3), League Cup (4)	19
78	(Scotland) Graeme Souness	2003	MF	1986–1991	73	League title (1)	54
79	(England) Terry Butcher	2002	DF	1986–1990	176	League title (3), League Cup (2)	77
80	(England) Chris Woods	2004	GK	1986–1991	230	League title (4), League Cup (3)	43
81	(Scotland) Richard Gough	2002	DF	1987–1997; 1997–1998	427	League title (9), Scottish Cup (3), League Cup (6)	61
82	(Scotland) Ian Ferguson	2006	MF	1988–2000	336	League title (10), Scottish Cup (3), League Cup (5)	9
83	(England) Ray Wilkins	2003	MF	1987–1989	96	League title (1), League Cup (1)	84
84	(Scotland) John Brown	2004	DF	1988–1997	278	League title (6), Scottish Cup (3), League Cup (3)	0
85	(England) Mark Hateley	2003	FW	1990–1995; 1997	222	League title (5), Scottish Cup (2), League Cup (3)	32
86	(Scotland) Andy Goram	2000	GK	1991–1998	260	League title (5), Scottish Cup (3), League Cup (2)	48
87	(Scotland) Stuart McCall	2008	MF	1991–1998	265	League title (5), Scottish Cup (3), League Cup (2)	40
88	(Denmark) Brian Laudrup	2000	MF	1994–1998	150	League title (3), Scottish Cup (1), League Cup (1)	75
89	(England) Paul Gascoigne	2003	MF	1995–1998	103	League title (2), Scottish Cup (1), League Cup (1)	57
90	(Germany) Jörg Albertz	2002	MF	1996–2001	182	League title (3), Scottish Cup (1), League Cup (2)	3
91	(Scotland) Barry Ferguson	2004	MF	1996–2003; 2005–2009	431	League title (5), Scottish Cup (5), League Cup (5)	45
92	(Italy) Lorenzo Amoruso	2010	DF	1997–2003	224	League title (3), Scottish Cup (3), League Cup (3)	0
93	(Germany) Stefan Klos	2009	GK	1998–2007	298	League title (4), Scottish Cup (4), League Cup (2)	0
94	(Netherlands) Fernando Ricksen	2014	DF	2000–2006	254	League title (2), Scottish Cup (2), League Cup (3)	12
95	(Spain) Nacho Novo	2014	FW	2004–2010	255	League title (3), Scottish Cup (1), League Cup (2)	0
96	(Scotland) David Weir	2011	DF	2007–2012	215	League title (3), Scottish Cup (2), League Cup (3)	69
97	(Scotland) Lee McCulloch	2014	DF	2007–2015	303	League title (3), Scottish Cup (2), League Cup (3), Third-tier title (1), Fourth-tier title (1)	18
98	(Scotland) Allan McGregor	2023	GK	2001–2012; 2018–2023	505	League title (4), Scottish Cup (4), League Cup (5)	42
99	(Northern Ireland) Steven Davis	2023	MF	2008–2012; 2019–2023	370	League title (4), Scottish Cup (3), League Cup (3)	140
100	(England) James Tavernier	2023	DF	2015-	457	League title (1), Scottish Cup (1), League Cup (1), Second-tier title (1), Challenge Cup (1)	0
