= List of Rangers F.C. records and statistics =

Rangers Football Club is a Scottish professional association football club based in Govan, Glasgow. They have played at their home ground, Ibrox, since 1899. Rangers were founding members of the Scottish Football League in 1890, and the Scottish Premier League in 1998.

Rangers have won 55 domestic top-flight league trophies. The club's record appearance maker is John Greig, who made 755 appearances between 1961 and 1978 in all matches. Ally McCoist is the club's record goalscorer, scoring 355 goals during his Rangers career.

This list encompasses the major honours won by Rangers as well as records set by the club, their managers and their players. The player records section includes details of the club's leading goalscorers and those who had made most appearances in first-team competitions. It also records notable achievements by Rangers players on the international stage, and the highest transfer fees paid and received by the club. Attendance records at Ibrox are also included in the list.

== Honours ==
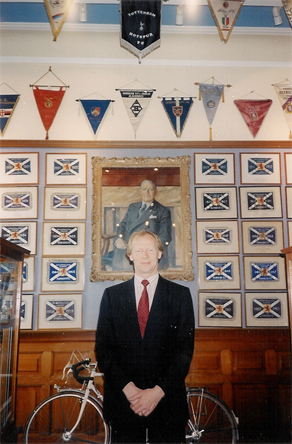
Former Northern Ireland striker Derek Spence in the trophy room at Ibrox in 1994. The bicycle behind him was a gift to Rangers from French club Saint-Etienne

Rangers have won fifty-five Scottish League Championships, which was previously a record, and they have won the Scottish League Cup a record 28 times. In their first league season, 1890–91, they won the Scottish Football league jointly with Dumbarton and their most recent success came in the 2023–24 Scottish League Cup.

Rangers have also won seven domestic trebles. They won their 100th major trophy in 2000, the first club in the world to reach that milestone. The club has played in both Scotland and England's national cup competitions. Rangers reached the semi-final of the 1886–87 FA Cup only to be knocked out by eventual winners Aston Villa.

=== Domestic ===
==== League ====
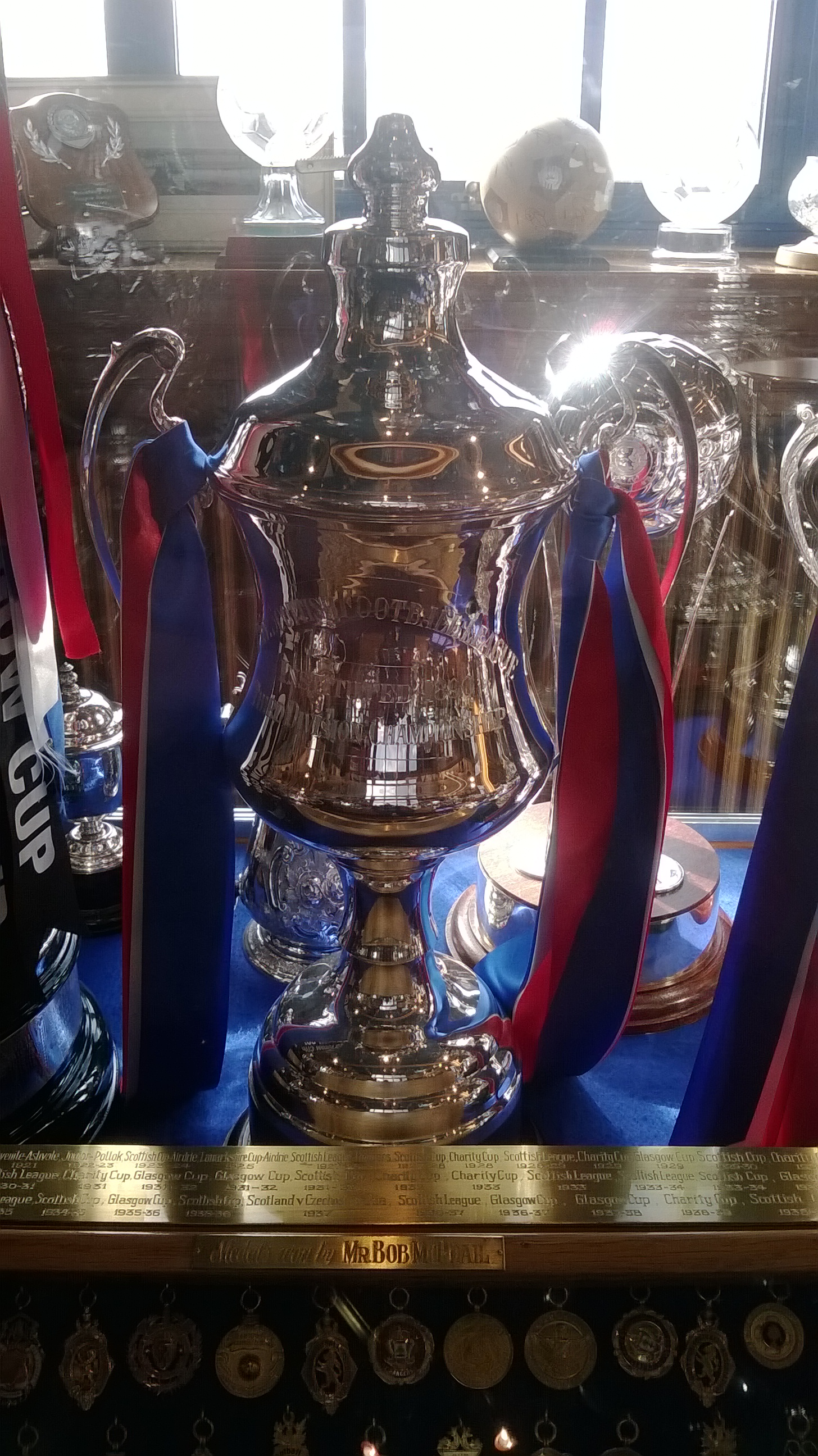
Scottish Third Division trophy, won by Rangers in 2013.

- Scottish League Championship (first tier league title):
  - Winners (55): 1890–91, (Note: Shared with Dumbarton F.C. after both clubs ended the season on 29 points. A play-off game at Cathkin Park on 21 May 1891 and finished 2–2, so the clubs were declared joint champions) 1898–99, 1899–1900, 1900–01, 1901–02, 1910–11, 1911–12, 1912–13, 1917–18, 1919–20, 1920–21, 1922–23, 1923–24, 1924–25, 1926–27, 1927–28, 1928–29, 1929–30, 1930–31, 1932–33, 1933–34, 1934–35, 1936–37, 1938–39, 1946–47, 1948–49, 1949–50, 1952–53, 1955–56, 1956–57, 1958–59, 1960–61, 1962–63, 1963–64, 1974–75, 1975–76, 1977–78, 1986–87, 1988–89, 1989–90, 1990–91, 1991–92, 1992–93, 1993–94, 1994–95, 1995–96, 1996–97, 1998–99, 1999–2000, 2002–03, 2004–05, 2008–09, 2009–10, 2010–11, 2020–21
  - Runners-up (36): 1892–93, 1895–96, 1897–98, 1904–05, 1913–14, 1915–16, 1918–19, 1921–22, 1931–32, 1935–36, 1947–48, 1950–51, 1951–52, 1952–53, 1957–58, 1961–62, 1965–66, 1966–67, 1967–68, 1968–69, 1969–70, 1972–73, 1976–77, 1978–79, 1997–98, 2000–01, 2001–02, 2003–04, 2006–07, 2007–08, 2011–12, 2018–19, 2019–20, 2021–22, 2022–23, 2023–24, 2024–25
- Scottish Championship (second-tier league title)
  - Winners: 2015–16
- Scottish League One (third tier league title)
  - Winners: 2013–14
- Scottish Third Division (fourth tier league title)
  - Winners: 2012–13

==== Cups ====
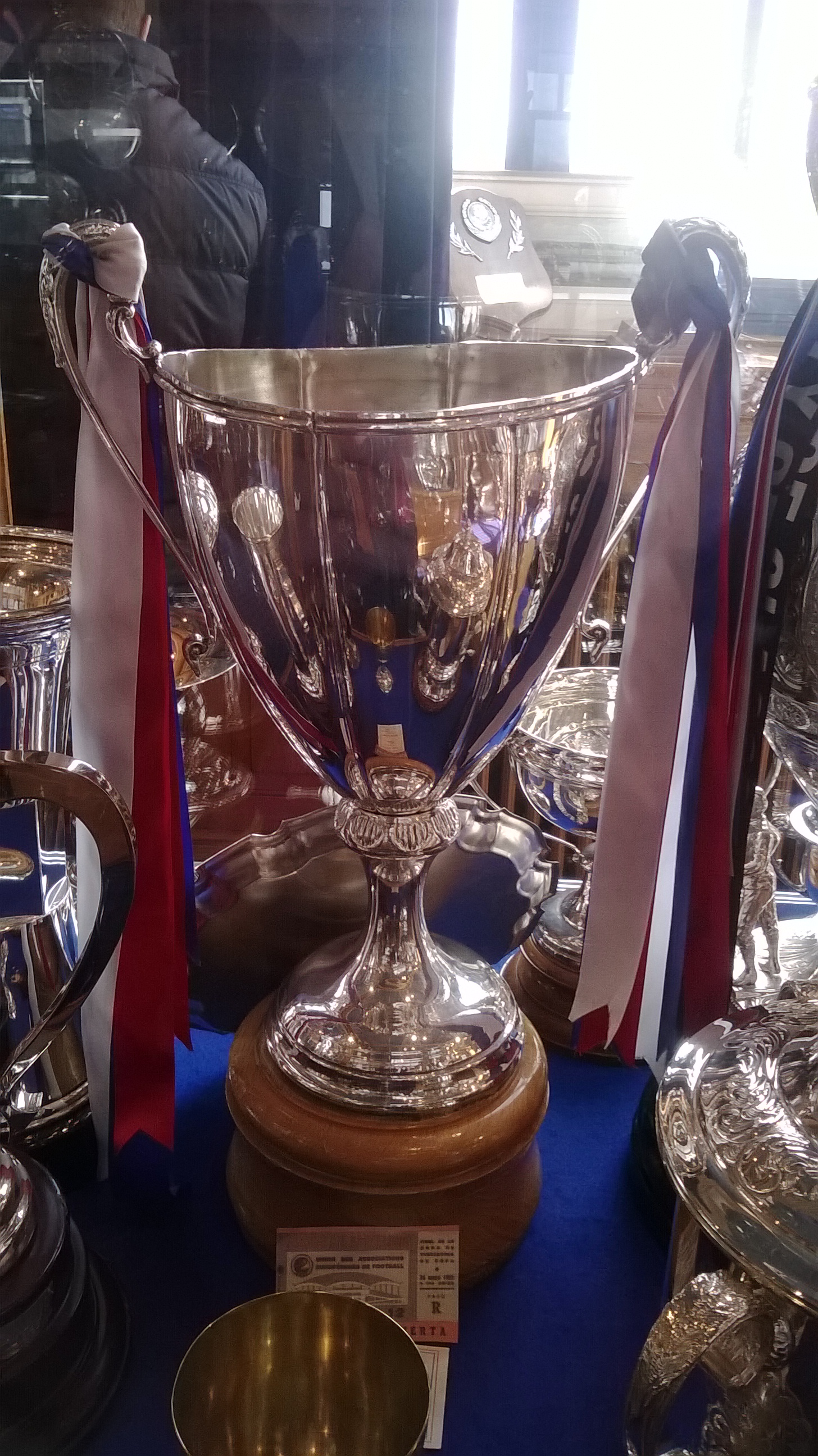
UEFA Cup Winners' Cup trophy won by Rangers in 1972.

- Scottish Cup:
  - Winners (34): 1893–94, 1896–97, 1897–98, 1902–03, 1927–28, 1929–30, 1931–32, 1933–34, 1934–35, 1935–36, 1947–48, 1948–49, 1949–50, 1952–53, 1959–60, 1961–62, 1962–63, 1963–64, 1965–66, 1972–73, 1975–76, 1977–78, 1978–79, 1980–81, 1991–92, 1992–93, 1995–96, 1998–99, 1999–2000, 2001–02, 2002–03, 2007–08, 2008–09, 2021–22
  - Runners-up (19): 1876–87, 1878–79, 1898–99, 1903–04, 1904–05, 1920–21, 1921–22, 1928–29, 1968–69, 1970–71, 1976–77, 1979–80, 1981–82, 1982–83, 1988–89, 1993–94, 1997–98, 2015–16, 2023–24
- Scottish League Cup:
  - Winners (28): 1946–47, 1948–49, 1960–61, 1961–62, 1963–64, 1964–65, 1970–71, 1975–76, 1977–78, 1978–79, 1981–82, 1983–84, 1984–85, 1986–87, 1987–88, 1988–89, 1990–91, 1992–93, 1993–94, 1996–97, 1998–99, 2001–02, 2002–03, 2004–05, 2007–08, 2009–10, 2010–11, 2023–24
  - Runners-up (10): 1951–52, 1957–58, 1965–66, 1966–67, 1982–83, 1989–90, 2008–09, 2019–20, 2022–23, 2024–25

=== International ===
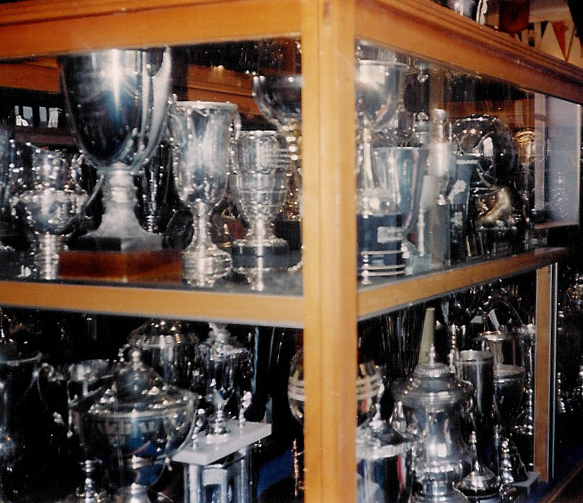
A view of one of the display cabinets in the trophy room at Ibrox in 1994.

- UEFA Cup Winners' Cup

Winners: 1972
Runners-up: 1960–61, 1966–67

- UEFA Cup/UEFA Europa League

Runners-up: 2007–08, 2021–22

- UEFA Super Cup

Runners-up: 1972

=== Others ===
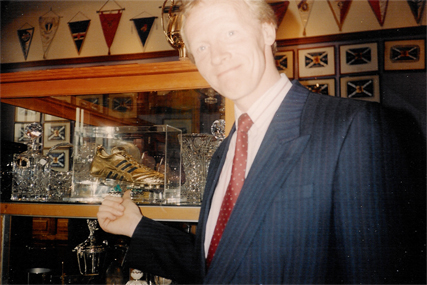
Spence next to the European Golden Boot, which was won by Ally McCoist in 1991–92 and 1992–93.

==== League ====
- Emergency War League

Winners: 1939–40

- Southern League

Winners (6): 1940–41, 1941–42, 1942–43, 1943–44, 1944–45, 1945–46

- Glasgow League

Winners: 1895–96, 1897–98

==== Cups ====
- Scottish War Emergency Cup

Winners: 1940

- Southern League Cup

Winners (4): 1940–41, 1941–42, 1942–43, 1944–45
Runners-up: 1943–44, 1945–46

- Victory Cup

Winners: 1946

- Summer Cup

Winners: 1942

- Glasgow Cup (Note: Refers to period when Glasgow Cup was a senior competition (1887 to 1989).)

Winners (44): 1893, 1894, 1897, 1898, 1900, 1901, 1902, 1911, 1912, 1913, 1914, 1918, 1919, 1922, 1923, 1924, 1925, 1930, 1932, 1933, 1934, 1936, 1937, 1938, 1940, 1942, 1943, 1944, 1945, 1948, 1950, 1954, 1957, 1958, 1960, 1969, 1971, 1975, (Note: 1975 trophy shared with Celtic after 2–2 draw) 1976, 1979, 1983, 1985, 1986, 1987

- Glasgow Merchants Charity Cup

Winners (32): 1878–79, 1896–97, 1899–1900, 1903–04, 1905–06, 1906–07, 1908–09, 1910–11, 1918–19, 1921–22, 1922–23, 1924–25, 1927–28, 1928–29, 1929–30, 1930–31, 1931–32, 1932–33, 1933–34, 1938–39, 1939–40, 1940–41, 1941–42, 1943–44, 1944–45, 1945–46, 1946–47, 1947–48, 1950–51, 1954–55, 1956–57, 1959–60

- Scottish Challenge Cup

Winners: 2015–16
Runners-up: 2013–14

==== Minor honours ====
- Queen's Park Tournament: 1886
- Sir William Cunningham Cup: 1889
- Rangers Sports Trophy: 1890
- Port Glasgow Athletic Tournament: 1892
- Football World Championship: 1894, 1900
- Glasgow International Exhibition Cup: 1901
- Edinburgh Exhibition Cup: 1908
- Lord Provost's Cup: 1921 (Note: Played in aid of the Lord Provosts Rent Relief Fund)
- British Champions' Challenge: 1933
- Sir Archibald Sinclair Cup: 1942 (Note: Played in aid of the Clydeside Air Raid Distress Fund)
- Paisley Charity Cup: 1972
- Jet Cup: 1977 (Note: Played for the 75th Anniversary of Volvo)
- Tennent Caledonian Cup: 1978
- Drybrough Cup: 1979
- Dubai Champions Cup: 1987
- Forum Cup: 1991 (Note: Also known as the Kilmarnock International Tournament)
- Ibrox International Challenge Trophy: 1995
- Wernesgrüner Cup: 2004 2003
- Walter Tull Memorial Cup:
- Blackthorn Cup: 2013
- Veolia Trophy: 2020

== Player records ==
=== Appearances ===
John Greig holds Rangers' appearance record, having played 755 times over the course of 18 seasons from 1961 to 1978. He also holds the records for League Cup appearances, with 121 appearances. Sandy Archibald is the holder of the most league appearances, having made 513, from 1917 to 1934. The Scottish Cup appearance record holder is midfielder Alec Smith while goalkeeper Allan McGregor holds the record for the most European appearances.

- Most appearances in all competitions: John Greig, 755
- Most league appearances: Sandy Archibald, 513
- Most Scottish Cup appearances: Alec Smith, 74
- Most League Cup appearances: John Greig, 121
- Most European appearances: Allan McGregor / James Tavernier, 109
- Most Challenge Cup appearances: Lee Wallace, 14
- Youngest first-team player: Derek Ferguson, 16 years, 24 days (vs. Queen of the South, 24 August 1983)
- Oldest first-team player: Allan McGregor, 41 years, 113 days (vs. Heart of Midlothian, 24 May 2023)
- Oldest debutant: Gareth McAuley, 38 years, 338 days (vs. Spartak Moscow, 8 November 2018)
- Most consecutive appearances: William Robb, 241 (from 13 April 1920 until 31 October 1925)
- Most appearances in a season: Carlos Cuéllar, 65 (during the 2007–08 season)
- Longest-serving player: Dougie Gray, 21 years, 60 days (from 27 July 1925 until 25 September 1946)

==== Most appearances ====
Competitive, professional matches only. Matches in parentheses are all time records.

Appearances records by player
#	Name and nationality	Years	League	Scottish Cup	League Cup	Europe	Total
1	(Scotland) John Greig	1961–1978	498	72	121	64	755
2	(Scotland) Sandy Jardine	1966–1982	451	64	107	52	674
3	(Scotland) Ally McCoist	1983–1998	418	47	62	54	581
4	(Scotland) Sandy Archibald	1917–1934	513	67	0	0	580
5	(England) James Tavernier	2015–2026	382	35	33	109	565
6	(Scotland) David Meiklejohn	1919–1936	490	73	0	0	563
7	(Scotland) Dougie Gray	1925–1946	490	65	0	0	555
8	(Scotland) Derek Johnstone	1970–1983; 1985–1986	369	57	85	35	546
9	(Scotland) Davie Cooper	1977–1989	376	49	77	38	540
10	(Scotland) Peter McCloy	1970–1986	351	55	86	43	535

=== Goalscorers ===
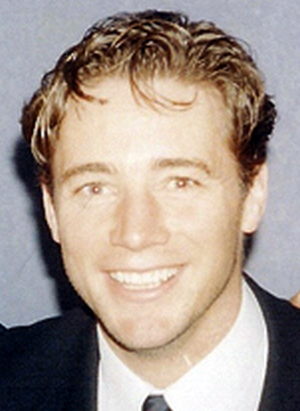
Ally McCoist, Rangers leading goal scorer

Rangers' all-time leading scorer is Ally McCoist, who scored 355 goals in a fifteen-year spell at the club from 1983 to 1998. He holds the record for the most goals in the Scottish League Cup competition with 54. However, McCoist was unable to surpass the Scottish Cup goal-scoring record of Jimmy Fleming, which has stood at 44 since 1934. Jim Forrest holds the record for the most goals in one season with 57 in all competitions.

- Most goals in all competitions: Ally McCoist, 355
- Most league goals: Ally McCoist, 251
- Most Scottish Cup goals: Jimmy Fleming, 44
- Most League Cup goals: Ally McCoist, 54
- Most Challenge Cup goals: Kenny Miller / Lee McCulloch, 5
- Most European goals: Alfredo Morelos, 29
- Most goals in one season: Jim Forrest, 57 (during the 1964–65 season)
- Most league goals in one season: Sam English, 44 (during the 1931–32 season)
- Most hat-tricks: Ally McCoist, 28
- Most penalties scored: James Tavernier, 69
- Most consecutive games scored in: Alfredo Morelos, 7 (during the 2018–19 season)
- Most goals scored by player in a match:
  - League match:
    - Jimmy Smith, 6 goals, won 9–1, (vs. Ayr United, 15 August 1933)
    - Jimmy Smith, 6 goals, won 7–1 (vs. Dunfermline Athletic, 11 August 1934)
    - Davie Wilson, 6 goals, won 7–1 (vs. Falkirk, 17 March 1962)
  - Scottish Cup match: Jimmy Fleming, 9 goals (vs. Blairgowrie, 20 January 1934)
  - Scottish League Cup match: Jim Forrest, 5 goals (vs. Hamilton Academical, 30 October 1965)
  - European match: Dave McPherson, 4 goals (vs. Valletta, 14 September 1983)
- Youngest goalscorer: Willie Thornton, 16 years, 312 days (vs. Arbroath, 9 January 1937)
- Oldest goalscorer: Jermain Defoe, 38 years, 220 days (vs. Aberdeen, 15 May 2021)
- Fastest goal scored in a match: Gordon Durie, 11 seconds (vs. Dundee United, 1 April 1995)

==== Top goalscorers ====
Goalscoring records by player
#	Name and nationality	Years	League	Scottish Cup	League Cup	Europe	Total
1	(Scotland) Ally McCoist	1983–1998	251 (418)	29 (47)	54 (62)	21 (54)	355
2	(Scotland) Bob McPhail	1927–1940	230 (354)	31 (54)	0	0	261
3	(Scotland) Jimmy Smith	1930–1946	225 (234)	24 (25)	0	0	249
4	(Scotland) Jimmy Fleming	1925–1934	176 (225)	44 (42)	0	0	220
5	(Scotland) Derek Johnstone	1970–1983; 1984–1985	132 (369)	30 (57)	39 (85)	9 (35)	210
6	(Scotland) Ralph Brand	1954–1965	118 (355)	13 (37)	27 (59)	12 (58)	206
7	(Scotland) Willie Reid	1909–1920	188 (217)	7 (13)	0	0	195
8	(Scotland) Willie Thornton	1936–1954	144 (224)	21 (34)	29 (50)	0	194
9	(Scotland) Robert C. Hamilton	1897–1908	157 (175)	27 (34)	0	0	184
10	(Scotland) Andy Cunningham	1914–1929	162 (350)	20 (39)	0	0	182

=== Internationalists ===
- First capped player: Moses McNeil (for Scotland, against Wales, 25 March 1876).
- Most international caps while a Rangers player: Steven Davis, 61 for Northern Ireland
- Most capped player to play for Rangers: Steven Davis, 140
- Most capped Scottish player to play for Rangers: David Weir and Kenny Miller, 69
- Player with most overall international goals to play for Rangers: David Healy, 36 for Northern Ireland
- Most international goals while a Rangers player: Ally McCoist, 19 for Scotland
- First Rangers player to appear at a World Cup: Eric Caldow (for Scotland vs. Yugoslavia, 8 June 1958)
- First Rangers player to score at a World Cup: Sammy Baird (for Scotland vs. France, 15 June 1958)
- FIFA World Cup
  - Most appearances while a Rangers player: Sandy Jardine, 4
  - Most goals while a Rangers player: Sammy Baird / Mo Johnston, 1
  - First winner to play for Rangers: Lionel Charbonnier (France)
- UEFA European Championship
  - Most European Championship appearances while a Rangers player: Andy Goram and Stuart McCall, 6
  - Most European Championship goals while a Rangers player: Brian Laudrup, 3
  - First Rangers player to appear: Chris Woods (for England, vs. Soviet Union, 18 June 1988)
  - First Rangers player to score: Brian Laudrup (for Denmark, vs. Portugal, 9 June 1996)
  - First winner to play for Rangers: Brian Laudrup (Denmark)

=== Transfers ===
For consistency, fees in the record transfer tables below are all sourced from BBC Sport's contemporary reports of each transfer. Where the report mentions an initial fee potentially rising to a higher figure depending on contractual clauses being satisfied in the future, only the initial fee is listed in the tables.

==== Record transfer fees paid ====
#	Player	From	Fee	Date	Source
1	(Norway) Tore André Flo	(England) Chelsea	£12,000,000	23 November 2000	
2	(Venezuela) Kevin Kelsy	(United States) Portland Timbers	£9,000,000	3 September 2026	
3	(South Korea) Kim Min-su	(Spain) Girona	£8,500,000	27 August 2026	
4	(Portugal) Youssef Chermiti	(England) Everton	£8,000,000	1 September 2025	
5	(England) Ryan Kent	(England) Liverpool	£6,500,000	2 September 2019	
5	(England) Michael Ball	(England) Everton	£6,500,000	20 August 2001	
6	(Brazil) Danilo	(Netherlands) Feyenoord	£6,000,000	28 July 2023	
6	(Croatia) Ivor Pandur	(England) Hull City	£6,000,000	1 July 2026	
7	(Spain) Mikel Arteta	(Spain) Barcelona	£5,800,000	29 June 2002	
8	(Russia) Andrei Kanchelskis	(Italy) Fiorentina	£5,500,000	15 July 1998	
8	(Netherlands) Giovanni van Bronckhorst	(Netherlands) Feyenoord	£5,500,000	6 July 1998	
9	(Czech Republic) Ryan Naderi	(Germany) Hansa Rostock	£4,700,000	2 February 2026	
10	(Serbia) Vanja Dragojević	(Serbia) Partizan Belgrade	£4,600,000	23 July 2026	
11	(Netherlands) Ronald de Boer	(Spain) Barcelona	£4,500,000	30 August 2000	
11	(Scotland) Barry Ferguson	(England) Blackburn Rovers	£4,500,000	31 January 2005	
11	(Ivory Coast) Mohamed Diomande	(Denmark) FC Nordsjælland	£4,500,000	1 July 2024	
11	(Netherlands) Arthur Numan	(Netherlands) PSV Eindhoven	£4,500,000	18 May 1998	
11	(Netherlands) Bert Konterman	(Netherlands) Feyenoord	£4,500,000	1 July 2000	
11	(Jamaica) Kemar Roofe	(Belgium) Anderlecht	£4,500,000	4 August 2020	
12	(England) Paul Gascoigne	(Italy) Lazio	£4,300,000	10 July 1995	
12	(Nigeria) Cyriel Dessers	(Italy) Cremonese	£4,300,000	6 July 2023	
12	(Denmark) Tochi Chukwuani	(Austria) Sturm Graz	£4,300,000	11 January 2026	
13	(Argentina) Gabriel Amato	(Spain) Real Mallorca	£4,200,000	6 July 1998	
14	(Scotland) Duncan Ferguson	(Scotland) Dundee United	£4,000,000	14 July 1993	
14	(Italy) Lorenzo Amoruso	(Italy) Fiorentina	£4,000,000	29 May 1997	
14	(Germany) Jörg Albertz	(Germany) Hamburg	£4,000,000	28 June 1996	
14	(Scotland) Colin Hendry	(England) Blackburn Rovers	£4,000,000	4 August 1998	
14	(Croatia) Nikica Jelavić	(Austria) Rapid Wien	£4,000,000	20 August 2010	
14	(Italy) Sergio Porrini	(Italy) Juventus	£4,000,000	10 June 1997	
14	(Netherlands) Michael Mols	(Netherlands) Utrecht	£4,000,000	1 July 1999	
14	(Colombia) Óscar Cortés	(France) Lens	£4,000,000	1 June 2025	

==== Record transfer fees received ====
#	Player	To	Fee	Date	Source
1	(Nigeria) Calvin Bassey	(Netherlands) Ajax	£19,600,000	20 July 2022	
2	(Scotland) Nathan Patterson	(England) Everton	£12,000,000	4 January 2022	
3	(Morocco) Hamza Igamane	(France) Lille	£10,400,000	29 August 2025	
4	(Scotland) Alan Hutton	(England) Tottenham Hotspur	£9,000,000	30 January 2008	
5	(Netherlands) Giovanni van Bronckhorst	(England) Arsenal	£8,500,000	20 June 2001	
6	(France) Jean-Alain Boumsong	(England) Newcastle United	£8,000,000	1 January 2005	
7	(Spain) Carlos Cuéllar	(England) Aston Villa	£7,800,000	12 August 2008	
8	(Scotland) Barry Ferguson	(England) Blackburn Rovers	£7,500,000	29 August 2003	
9	(Norway) Tore André Flo	(England) Sunderland	£6,750,000	30 August 2002	
10	(Nigeria) Joe Aribo	(England) Southampton	£6,000,000	9 July 2022	
10	(Brazil) Jefté	(Brazil) Palmeiras	£6,000,000	20 August 2025	
11	(England) Trevor Steven	(France) Marseille	£5,500,000	31 August 1991	
11	(Croatia) Nikica Jelavić	(England) Everton	£5,500,000	31 January 2012	
11	(Finland) Glen Kamara	(England) Leeds United	£5,500,000	31 August 2023	
12	(Finland) Oliver Antman	(Belgium) Anderlecht	£4,500,000	29 July 2026	
12	(Ivory Coast) Mohamed Diomande	(Turkey) Çorum	£4,500,000	12 August 2026	
13	(Scotland) Duncan Ferguson	(England) Everton	£4,300,000	13 December 1994	
14	(Italy) Gennaro Gattuso	(Italy) Salernitana	£4,000,000	24 October 1998	
14	(United States) Claudio Reyna	(England) Sunderland	£4,000,000	December 7, 2001	
14	(Zambia) Fashion Sakala	(Saudi Arabia) Al-Fayha	£4,000,000	8 August 2023	

== Managerial records ==
- First manager: William Wilton, from 27 May 1899 to 20 May 1920
- Longest-serving manager by time: Bill Struth, from 20 May 1920 to 15 June 1954
- Shortest-serving manager by time: Russell Martin, from 5 June 2025 to 5 October 2025
- First non-Scottish manager: Dick Advocaat, from 1 June 1998 to 12 December 2001

== Club records ==
=== Matches ===
==== Firsts ====
- First match: vs. Callander, Friendly, Draw 0–0, Flesher's Haugh (Glasgow Green), (H) May 1872
- First Scottish Cup match: vs. Oxford University A.F.C., Won 2–0, Recreational Ground – Queen's Park, Glasgow, 12 October 1874
- First FA Cup match: vs. Everton, Won 1–0, Stanley Park (A), 30 October 1886
- First League match: vs. Heart of Midlothian, Won 5–2, Ibrox Park (H), 16 August 1890
- First match at 'first' Ibrox: vs. Preston North End, Friendly, Lost 8–1, (H) 20 August 1887
- First match at 'second' Ibrox: vs. Heart of Midlothian, Won 3–1, Inter-City League, (H) 30 December 1899
- First League Cup match: vs. St Mirren, Won 4–0, Ibrox Park (H), 21 September 1946
- First European match: vs. Nice, Won 2–1, European Cup, Ibrox Park (H), 24 October 1956
- First Challenge Cup match: vs. Brechin City, Won 2–1, Glebe Park (H), 29 July 2012

==== Wins ====
Record victory

- Record win:
  - 14-2 (against Whitehill, 29 September 1883)
  - 14–2 (vs. Blairgowrie, 20 January 1934).
- Record league win: 10–0 (vs. Hibernian, 24 December 1898)
- Record Scottish Cup win:
  - 13–0 (vs. Possilpark, 6 October 1877)
  - 13–0 (vs. Uddingston, 10 November 1877)
  - 13–0 (vs. Kelvinside Athletic, 28 September 1889)
- Record League Cup win: 9–1 (vs. St Johnstone, 15 August 1964)
- Record European win: 10–0 (vs. Valletta, 28 September 1983)
- Most league wins in a season: 18 wins out of 18 games (during the 1898–99 season)
- Fewest league wins in a season: 8 wins out of 18 games (during the 1893–94 season)

==== Defeats ====
- Record defeat:
  - 2–10 (vs. Airdrieonians, Friendly, 6 February 1886)
  - 0–8 Vale of Leven (Friendly, 6 November 1888)
- Record league defeat: 0–6 (vs. Dumbarton, 4 May 1892)
- Record Scottish Cup defeat: 0–6 (vs. Aberdeen, 10 April 1954)
- Record League Cup defeat: 1–7 (vs. Celtic, 19 October 1957)
- Record European defeat:
  - 0–6 (vs. Real Madrid, 9 October 1963)
  - 1–7 (vs. Liverpool, 12 October 2022)
  - 0–6 (vs. Club Brugge, 28 August 2025)
- Most league defeats in a season: 14 defeats from 36 games (during the 1979–80 and the 1985–86 seasons)
- Fewest defeats in a season: 0 defeats from 18 games (during the 1898–99 season) and 0 defeats from 36 games (during the 2013-14 season) 0 defeats from 38 games 2020–21 season

=== Goals ===
- Most league goals scored in a season: 118 goals in 38 games (during the 1933–34 season)
- Fewest league goals scored in a season:

From 18 league matches: 41 goals
From 20 league matches: 60 goals
From 22 league matches: 56 goals
From 26 league matches: 80 goals
From 30 league matches: 56 goals
From 34 league matches: 58 goals
From 36 league matches: 48 goals
From 38 league matches: 56 goals (during the 2016–17 season)
From 42 league matches: 83 goals
From 44 league matches: 74 goals

- Most league goals conceded in a season: 55 goals (twice, during the 1925–26 and 1938–39 seasons)
- Fewest league goals conceded in a season: 13 goals (during the 2020–21 season)
- 1,000th league goal: Alex Smith, (against Clyde, won 5–1, 8 December 1906).
- 2,000th league goal: Jimmy Gordon, (against Kilmarnock, won 7–1, 15 September 1919).
- 3,000th league goal: Bob McGowan, (against Cowdenbeath, won 7–0, 20 December 1930).
- 4,000th league goal: Jimmy Duncanson, (against Dundee, won 3–1, 25 December 1947).
- 5,000th league goal: Alex Scott, (against Ayr United, won 7-3, 29 April 1961).
- 6,000th league goal: Derek Parlane, (against Heart of Midlothian, won 4-2, 19 January 1974).
- 7,000th league goal: Ally McCoist, (against Motherwell, won 3–0, 9 December 1989).
- 8,000th league goal: Shota Arveladze, (against Dundee, won 3–0, 10 August 2002).
- 9,000th league goal: Lee McCulloch, (against Raith Rovers, won 6-1, 18 October 2014).

=== Points ===
- Most points in a season:

Two points for a win: 76 (during the 1920–21 season)
Three points for a win: 102 (during the 2020–21 season)

- Fewest points in a season:

Two points for a win: 20 (during the 1893–94 season)
Three points for a win: 67 (during the 2016–17 season)

=== Attendances ===
- Record Scottish League attendance: 118,567 (vs. Celtic, won 2–1, Ibrox Park (H), 2 January 1939)
- Record Scottish Cup attendance: 143,570 (vs. Hibernian, won 1–0, Hampden Park (N), 27 March 1948)
- Record Scottish League Cup attendance: 125,154 (vs. Hibernian, won 3–1, Hampden Park (N), 22 March 1947)
- Record European attendance: 100,000 (vs. Dynamo Kiev, lost 1–0, Respublikanskiy Stadium (A), 16 September 1987)
- Record home League attendance: 118,567 (vs. Celtic, won 2–1, 2 January 1939)
- Record home Scottish Cup attendance: 102,342 (vs. Hibernian, lost 3–2, 10 February 1951)
- Record home Scottish League Cup attendance: 105,000 (vs. Celtic, won 2–1, 16 October 1948)
- Record home European attendance: 85,000 (vs. Leeds United, draw 0–0, 26 March 1968)
- Lowest home League attendance: 6,087 (vs. Partick Thistle, won 1–0, 23 May 1979)
- Lowest home Scottish Cup attendance:
- Lowest home Scottish League Cup attendance: 5,000 (vs. Brechin City, won 1–0, 23 September 1981)
- Lowest home European attendance: 14,268 (vs. ASK Vorwärts Berlin, won 2–1, 15 November 1961) (Note: Match played in Malmö, Sweden.)
