= 1933–34 Scottish Cup =

Tournament details
- Country: Scotland

Final positions
- Champions: Rangers
- Runners-up: St Mirren

The 1933–34 Scottish Cup was the 56th staging of Scotland's most prestigious football knockout competition. The Cup was won by Rangers who defeated St Mirren in the final.

== Fourth round ==
Team One	Team Two	Score
Rangers	Aberdeen	1-0
St Johnstone	Queen of the South	2-0
St Mirren	Celtic	2-0
Albion Rovers	Motherwell	1-1 0-6

== Semi-finals ==
31 March 1934

Rangers	1–0	St Johnstone
Marshall 80'

Hampden Park, Glasgow
Attendance: 60,119
Referee: W. Webb

31 March 1934

St Mirren	3–1	Motherwell
Knox 15', 64' (pen.), 69'		MacFadyen 89'

Tynecastle Park, Edinburgh
Attendance: 30,000
Referee: M. C. Hutton

== Final ==
21 April 1934

Rangers	5–0	St Mirren
Nicholson; McPhail; Main; Smith

Hampden Park, Glasgow
Attendance: 113,430

=== Teams ===
Rangers:
GK	Tom Hamilton
RB	Dougie Gray
LB	Whitey McDonald
RH	Davie Meiklejohn
CH	Jimmy Simpson
LH	George Brown
OR	Bobby Main
IR	James Marshall
CF	Willie Nicholson
IL	Jimmy Smith
OL	Bob McPhail

St Mirren:
GK	James McCloy
RB	Walter Hay
LB	Bobby Ancell
RH	Allan Gebbie
CH	Fulton Wilson
LH	John Miller
OR	Jimmy Knox
IR	John Latimer
CF	Jimmy McGregor
IL	James McCabe
OL	John Phillips

== See also ==
- 1933–34 in Scottish football
