= Walter Hay =

Scottish footballer

Personal information
- Full name: Walter McGibbon Hay
- Date of birth: 1901
- Place of birth: Partick, Scotland
- Position: Right back

Senior career*
Years	Team	Apps	(Gls)
–	Petershill		
1924–1935	St Mirren	234	(0)
1925	→ King's Park (loan)	10	(0)
1935–1936	Rangers	1	(0)
Total		245	(0)

International career
1932	Scottish League XI	1	(0)
- * Club domestic league appearances and goals

Walter McGibbon Hay (born 1901) was a Scottish footballer who played as a right back, primarily for St Mirren. He played a part in the run to the Paisley club's Scottish Cup victory in 1926, but did not take part in the final, with Andrew Findlay preferred. Hay was an established part of the team by the time the Buddies reached another final in 1934, but this time they lost 5–0 to Rangers. The following season he signed for Rangers, but was only a reserve to the almost-ever present Dougie Gray and Whitey McDonald (1 league appearance) so was not entitled to a medal from their 1934–35 Scottish Division One title win, nor was he involved in their Scottish Cup final victory of that year, although he played for the Gers in the competition's First Round.

Hay was selected once for the Scottish Football League XI in 1932.
