= James McCloy =

Scottish footballer

Personal information
- Date of birth: 1906
- Place of birth: Howwood, Scotland
- Date of death: 1979 (aged 72–73)
- Place of death: Girvan, Scotland
- Position: Goalkeeper

Senior career*
| Years | Team | Apps | (Gls) |
- Petershill
| 1931–1933 | Clyde | 6 | (0) |
| 1933–1938 | St Mirren | 130 | (0) |
| 1938–1939 | Bradford City | 37 | (0) |
| 1939 | Swansea Town | | |
- * Club domestic league appearances and goals

James McCloy (1906 – 1979) was a Scottish professional footballer who played as a goalkeeper.

== Career ==
Born in Howwood, McCloy joined St Mirren from Clyde in October 1933; he made 148 appearances for the Paisley club, and played in the 1934 Scottish Cup Final for them. He moved to Bradford City in August 1938. He made 37 Football League and 1 FA Cup appearances for the club. He left the club in May 1939 to join Swansea Town His career was ended by the Second World War. He later worked as a fireman.

== Personal life ==
His son Peter was also a footballer and a goalkeeper.

== Sources ==
- Frost, Terry (1988). Bradford City A Complete Record 1903-1988. Breedon Books Sport. ISBN 0-907969-38-0.
