= John Miller (St Mirren footballer) =

Scottish footballer

Personal information
- Date of birth: c. 1905
- Place of birth: Glasgow, Scotland
- Position: Left half

Senior career*
Years	Team	Apps	(Gls)
–	Renfrew		
–	Yoker Athletic		
–	Petershill		
1925–1929	St Mirren	353	(8)
1925	→ Clydebank (loan)	5	(0)
Total		358	(8)

International career
1931–1934	Scotland	5	(0)
- * Club domestic league appearances and goals

John Miller was a Scottish footballer who played as a left half for Renfrew, Yoker Athletic, Petershill, Clydebank, St Mirren and Scotland.

Miller played with St Mirren for 14 years; as a reserve in 1926 he had no involvement in their successful Scottish Cup campaign, but in contrast he was an integral part of the team which reached the same stage of the competition again in 1934, but this time lost to Rangers. That outcome would have been particularly disappointing for Miller personally, coming just after a defeat to England in what proved to be his last of five international appearances.
