= Andrew Findlay =

English-born Scottish footballer

Personal information
- Date of birth: c. 1899
- Place of birth: Audenshaw, England
- Date of death: 1976 (aged 76–77)
- Place of death: Kirkcaldy, Scotland
- Height: 5 ft 8 1/2 in (1.74 m)
- Position: Right back

Senior career*
Years	Team	Apps	(Gls)
–	Rosslyn Juniors		
1922–1929	St Mirren	219	(0)
1929–1931	Dundee United	9	(0)
1931	Armadale	3	(0)
Total		231	(0)
- * Club domestic league appearances and goals

Andrew Findlay (1899 – 1976) was a Scottish footballer who played as a right back, primarily for St Mirren.

Joining the Paisley club after serving in the Royal Navy during World War I, over seven seasons he made 246 appearances in major competitions (without scoring) and was in the team which won the Scottish Cup in 1926. He was offered a benefit match against a 'Scottish Select' in 1928, but by the following year he had lost his place to understudy Walter Hay, and moved on to Dundee United for a short spell.
