= Jerry Dawson (footballer, born 1909) =

Scottish footballer

Personal information
- Full name: James Dawson
- Date of birth: 30 October 1909
- Place of birth: Falkirk, Scotland
- Date of death: 19 January 1977 (aged 67)
- Place of death: Falkirk, Scotland
- Position: Goalkeeper

Youth career
- Gairdoch Juveniles

Senior career*
Years	Team	Apps	(Gls)
- Camelon Juniors
1929–1945	Rangers	236	(0)
1945–1949	Falkirk	78	(0)

International career
1934–1939	Scotland	14	(0)
1931–1941	Scottish Football League XI	11	(0)

Managerial career
- 1953–1958: East Fife
- * Club domestic league appearances and goals

James "Jerry" Dawson (30 October 1909 – 19 January 1977) was a Scottish footballer who played as a goalkeeper and spent most of his career with Rangers.

== Career ==
Born in Falkirk, Dawson's position as a goalkeeper saw him nicknamed 'Jerry' after the famous English custodian with whom he shared a surname. He began his career playing with local Junior side Camelon, before turning professional with Rangers in November 1929. He spent the next 16 years with the Ibrox side, winning the Scottish league five times and the Scottish Cup twice. He made 236 league appearances for Rangers and was capped 14 times by Scotland between 1934 and 1939. He also appeared 11 times for the Scottish Football League XI.

Dawson moved to home-town club Falkirk in 1945 and retired at the end of the 1948–49 season. After a spell as a journalist with the Daily Record, he moved into coaching when appointed East Fife's manager in July 1953. He guided his new side to the League Cup within months of his appointment but eventually left the Fifers in July 1958, after they suffered relegation to Division Two.

Dawson's contribution to Scottish football has been recognised by former club Rangers and he was posthumously elected to their Hall of Fame. He was nicknamed "The Prince in the Yellow Jersey" (this was the colour traditionally worn by the club's goalkeepers).
