= Johnny Hubbard =

South African soccer player

Personal information
- Full name: John Gaulton Hubbard
- Date of birth: 16 December 1930
- Place of birth: Pretoria, South Africa
- Date of death: 21 June 2018 (aged 87)
- Height: 5 ft 6 in (1.68 m)
- Position: Left winger

Youth career
- 1943–1947: Berea Park

Senior career*
Years	Team	Apps	(Gls)
1947–	Berea Park		
- Arcadia Shepherds
1949	Pretoria Municipals		
1949–1959	Rangers	172	(77)
1959–1962	Bury	109	(29)
1962–1964	Ayr United	52	(5)

International career
1955	Scottish League XI	4	(2)
1956	South Africa XI	1	(1)
- * Club domestic league appearances and goals

John Gaulton Hubbard, MBE (16 December 1930 – 21 June 2018) was a South African footballer. Hubbard spent the majority of his career at Scottish club Rangers, and later played for English club Bury before ending his career back in Scotland with Ayr United. He was the first African player to compete in the European Cup, having played in October 1956 with Rangers versus Nice, and also the first African player to score a goal in the competition.

He became one of the few players to score a hat-trick in an Old Firm match, which he achieved on 1 January 1955, the only foreign player in Rangers' history to do so. Hubbard was nicknamed the "Penalty King" by Rangers fans, due to his exceptional record of 65 goals scored from 68 penalty kicks, 22 consecutively.

He left Rangers in 1959 with 172 appearances and 77 goals for the club, moving to Bury for £6,000. After three years at Bury he returned to Scotland, spending two years with Ayr United before retiring from football to work as a physical education teacher and a community sports development officer. In 2007, he was named an honorary member of the Rangers Supporters Trust, along with Mark Walters and Billy Simpson.

Hubbard died in June 2018, aged 87.

== Honours ==
Rangers

- Scottish first-tier League Championships (5): 1949–50, 1952–53, 1955–56, 1956–57, 1958–59
- Scottish Cup (2): 1949–50, 1952–53
