= David Provan (footballer, born 1941) =

Scottish footballer and manager

Personal information
- Full name: David Provan
- Date of birth: 11 March 1941
- Place of birth: Falkirk, Scotland
- Date of death: 26 November 2016 (aged 75)
- Position: Defender

Senior career*
Years	Team	Apps	(Gls)
1958–1970	Rangers	171	(9)
1970–1971	Crystal Palace	1	(0)
1971–1974	Plymouth Argyle	129	(10)
1974–1975	St Mirren	13	(0)
Total		314	(19)

International career
1963–1965	Scotland	5	(0)
1964	Scotland U23	1	(1)
1964	SFL trial v SFA	1	(0)
1967	Scottish League XI	1	(0)

Managerial career
- 1987–1991: Albion Rovers
- * Club domestic league appearances and goals

David Provan (11 March 1941 – 26 November 2016) was a Scottish professional footballer, who played for Rangers, Crystal Palace, Plymouth Argyle and St Mirren. Provan also played for Scotland and the Scottish League XI.

== Career ==
Provan was a product of the Rangers youth team and played as a full back. He made his debut on 27 December 1958, in a league match away to Third Lanark which Rangers won 3–2. He helped the club win a domestic treble in 1963–64 and played in the 1967 European Cup Winners' Cup Final, which Rangers lost 1–0 to Bayern Munich. Provan is one of the players elected to Rangers' Hall of Fame.

He left the club in June 1970 and joined English club Crystal Palace, although he was not there for long, making only two senior appearances in total, before moving on in March 1971, to Plymouth Argyle. He stayed at Plymouth for five seasons and made over 100 appearances.

Provan subsequently played for St Mirren where he finished his senior career in 1975, and began his coaching career under then-manager Alex Ferguson. He later went on to manage Albion Rovers from 1987 to 1991, leading the club to the Scottish Football League Second Division title in 1988–9.

Rangers FC announced on 26 November 2016 that Provan had died, following a long illness.
