= Ibrox International Challenge Trophy =

- Founded: 1994
- Abolished: 1995
- Region: Europe
- Teams: 4
- Last champions: Rangers (1995)
- Most championships: (Italy) Sampdoria (Scotland) Rangers (1 title each)

The Ibrox International Challenge Trophy was a short-lived preseason football tournament held at Ibrox Park in 1994 and 1995 and contested by teams from Europe, including the hosts Rangers of Scotland.

== Results ==
=== 1994 ===
Semi-finals
5 August – Glasgow (Ibrox Park)
(England) Manchester United	1
(England) Newcastle United	1
5 August – Glasgow (Ibrox Park)
(Scotland) Rangers	2
(Italy) Sampdoria	4

Final
6 August – Glasgow (Ibrox Park)
(England) Newcastle United	1
(Italy) Sampdoria	3
Third place
6 August – Glasgow (Ibrox Park)
(Scotland) Rangers	1
(England) Manchester United	0

Newcastle United beat Manchester United 6–5 on penalties.

=== 1995 ===
Semi-finals
29 July – Glasgow (Ibrox Park)
(Scotland) Rangers	4
(Romania) Steaua București	0
29 July – Glasgow (Ibrox Park)
(Italy) Sampdoria	2
(England) Tottenham Hotspur	0

Final
30 July – Glasgow (Ibrox Park)
(Scotland) Rangers	2
(Italy) Sampdoria	0
Third place
30 July – Glasgow (Ibrox Park)
(Romania) Steaua București	3
(England) Tottenham Hotspur	2

== See also ==
- Tennent Caledonian Cup
