= Tennent Caledonian Cup =

The Tennent Caledonian Cup
- Founded: 1976
- Region: United Kingdom
- Teams: 4
- Current champions: Kilmarnock (1979)

The Tennent Caledonian Cup (sponsored by Tennent Caledonian Breweries) was a short-lived preseason football tournament held at Ibrox Park from 1976 to 1979 and contested by teams from England and Scotland.

== Results ==
=== 1976 ===
Semi-finals
2 August – Glasgow (Ibrox Park)
(England) Manchester City	1
(England) Southampton	1
2 August – Glasgow (Ibrox Park)
(Scotland) Rangers	2
(Scotland) Partick Thistle	0

Final
3 August – Glasgow (Ibrox Park)
(Scotland) Rangers	1
(England) Southampton	2
Third place
3 August – Glasgow (Ibrox Park)
(England) Manchester City	4
(Scotland) Partick Thistle	1

Southampton beat Manchester City on the toss of a coin.

=== 1977 ===
Semi-finals
6 August – Glasgow (Ibrox Park)
(Scotland) St Mirren	3
(England) West Bromwich Albion	4
6 August – Glasgow (Ibrox Park)
(Scotland) Rangers	3
(England) Southampton	1

Final
7 August – Glasgow (Ibrox Park)
(Scotland) Rangers	0
(England) West Bromwich Albion	2
Third place
7 August – Glasgow (Ibrox Park)
(Scotland) St Mirren	1
(England) Southampton	2

=== 1978 ===
Semi-finals
5 August – Glasgow (Ibrox Park)
(England) Southampton	1
(England) West Bromwich Albion	1
5 August – Glasgow (Ibrox Park)
(Scotland) Rangers	3
(Scotland) Hearts	1

Final
6 August – Glasgow (Ibrox Park)
(Scotland) Rangers	4
(England) Southampton	1
Third place
6 August – Glasgow (Ibrox Park)
(Scotland) Hearts	2
(England) West Bromwich Albion	0

Southampton beat West Bromwich Albion on penalties.

=== 1979 ===
Semi-finals
3 August – Glasgow (Ibrox Park)
(Scotland) Kilmarnock	1
(England) Brighton & Hove Albion	1
3 August – Glasgow (Ibrox Park)
(Scotland) Rangers	3
(England) West Ham United	2

Final
5 August – Glasgow (Ibrox Park)
(Scotland) Rangers	2
(Scotland) Kilmarnock	2
Third place
5 August – Glasgow (Ibrox Park)
(England) Brighton & Hove Albion	3
(England) West Ham United	1

Kilmarnock beat Brighton & Hove Albion and Rangers on penalties.

== Overall ==
Team	Winner	Runner-up	Third place	Fourth place
(Scotland) Rangers	1	3		
(England) Southampton	1	1	1	
(England) West Bromwich Albion	1			1
(Scotland) Kilmarnock	1			
(England) Brighton & Hove Albion			1	
(Scotland) Hearts			1	
(England) Manchester City			1	
(Scotland) Partick Thistle				1
(Scotland) St. Mirren				1
(England) West Ham United				1

== See also ==
- Anglo-Scottish Cup
- Ibrox International Challenge Trophy
