= 1931–32 Rangers F.C. season =

Rangers
1931–32 season
- Chairman: Joseph Buchanan
- Manager: Bill Struth
- Ground: Ibrox Park
- Scottish League Division One: 2nd P38 W28 D5 L5 F118 A42 Pts61
- Scottish Cup: Winners
| Home colours | Away colours | Third colours |

The 1931–32 season was the 58th season of competitive football by Rangers.

== Results ==
All results are written with Rangers' score first.

=== Scottish League Division One ===
| Date | Opponent | Venue | Result | Attendance | Scorers |
|---|---|---|---|---|---|
| 8 August 1931 | Dundee | H | 4–1 | 40,000 | |
| 11 August 1931 | Airdrieonians | H | 2–1 | 10,000 | |
| 15 August 1931 | Motherwell | A | 2–4 | 25,000 | |
| 18 August 1931 | Morton | H | 7–3 | 10,000 | |
| 22 August 1931 | St Mirren | H | 4–0 | 25,000 | |
| 25 August 1931 | Leith Athletic | H | 4–0 | 6,000 | |
| 29 August 1931 | Ayr United | A | 3–1 | 10,000 | |
| 2 September 1931 | Falkirk | A | 2–1 | 13,000 | |
| 5 September 1931 | Celtic | H | 0–0 | 13,000 | |
| 12 September 1931 | Partick Thistle | A | 3–1 | 25,000 | |
| 15 September 1931 | Aberdeen | H | 4–1 | 10,000 | |
| 26 September 1931 | Heart of Midlothian | A | 0–0 | 31,023 | |
| 3 October 1931 | Cowdenbeath | H | 6–1 | 8,000 | |
| 17 October 1931 | Queen's Park | H | 0–1 | 25,000 | |
| 24 October 1931 | Hamilton Academical | A | 2–1 | 10,000 | |
| 31 October 1931 | Dundee United | H | 5–0 | 15,000 | |
| 14 November 1931 | Clyde | H | 2–2 | 6,000 | |
| 21 November 1931 | Morton | A | 2–1 | 10,000 | |
| 28 November 1931 | Leith Athletic | A | 5–2 | 7,000 | |
| 5 December 1931 | Falkirk | H | 4–0 | 5,000 | |
| 12 December 1931 | Aberdeen | A | 0–0 | 23,000 | |
| 19 December 1931 | Dundee | A | 2–4 | 16,000 | |
| 26 December 1931 | Motherwell | H | 1–0 | 50,000 | |
| 1 January 1932 | Celtic | A | 2–1 | 55,000 | |
| 2 January 1932 | Partick Thistle | H | 4–0 | 16,000 | |
| 9 January 1932 | St Mirren | A | 2–0 | 18,000 | |
| 23 January 1932 | Ayr United | H | 6–1 | 9,000 | |
| 6 February 1932 | Heart of Midlothian | H | 4–2 | 25,000 | |
| 20 February 1932 | Third Lanark | H | 6–1 | 25,000 | |
| 27 February 1932 | Queen's Park | A | 6–1 | 30,000 | |
| 12 March 1932 | Dundee United | A | 5–0 | 7,000 | |
| 19 March 1932 | Kilmarnock | H | 3–0 | 16,000 | |
| 28 March 1932 | Third Lanark | A | 3–4 | 40,000 | |
| 2 April 1932 | Cowdenbeath | A | 7–1 | 7,000 | |
| 23 April 1932 | Clyde | A | 1–1 | 10,000 | |
| 25 April 1932 | Airdrieonians | A | 0–3 | 4,000 | |
| 27 April 1932 | Hamilton Academical | H | 1–0 | 6,000 | |
| 30 April 1932 | Kilmarnock | A | 4–2 | 10,000 | |

=== Scottish Cup ===
| Date | Round | Opponent | Venue | Result | Attendance | Scorers |
|---|---|---|---|---|---|---|
| 16 January 1932 | R1 | Brechin City | H | 8–2 | 6,000 | |
| 30 January 1932 | R2 | Raith Rovers | A | 5–0 | 18,052 | |
| 13 February 1932 | R3 | Heart of Midlothian | A | 1–0 | 53,396 | |
| 5 March 1932 | R4 | Motherwell | H | 2–0 | 88,000 | |
| 26 March 1932 | SF | Hamilton Academical | N | 5–2 | 53,000 | |
| 16 April 1932 | F | Kilmarnock | N | 1–1 | 111,982 | |
| 20 April 1932 | F R | Kilmarnock | N | 3–0 | 110,695 | |

== See also ==
- 1931–32 in Scottish football
- 1931–32 Scottish Cup
