= Billy Ritchie =

Scottish footballer (1936–2016)

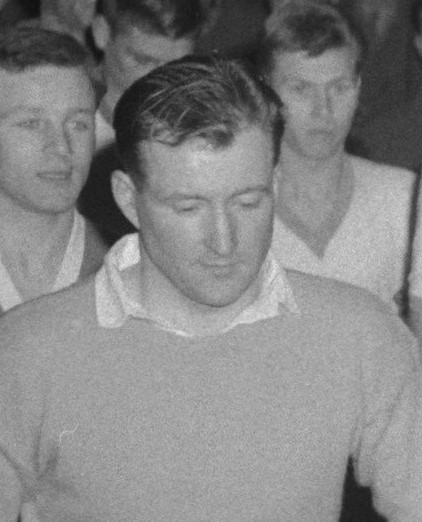
- Ritchie in 1960

Personal information
- Full name: William Ritchie
- Date of birth: 11 September 1936
- Place of birth: Newtongrange, Scotland
- Date of death: 10 March 2016 (aged 79)
- Height: 1.80 m (5 ft 11 in)
- Position: Goalkeeper

Youth career
- Bathgate Thistle

Senior career*
Years	Team	Apps	(Gls)
1955–1967	Rangers	207	(0)
1967–1970	Partick Thistle	57	(0)
1970–1976	Motherwell	13	(0)
1976–1980	Stranraer	23	(0)
Total		300	(0)

International career
1962	Scotland	1	(0)
- * Club domestic league appearances and goals

William Ritchie (11 September 1936 – 10 March 2016) was a Scottish professional footballer who was best known for his time with Rangers.

Ritchie started his career at local side Bathgate Thistle before moving to Rangers in 1955. He played both legs of Rangers 1961 European Cup Winners' Cup Final defeat to Fiorentina.

He left Rangers in 1967 and joined Partick Thistle. Ritchie died on 10 March 2016, aged 79.
