= Jimmy Simpson (footballer, born 1908) =

Scottish footballer

Personal information
- Full name: James McMillan Simpson
- Date of birth: 29 October 1908
- Place of birth: Ladybank, Scotland
- Date of death: 15 March 1972 (aged 63)
- Place of death: Glasgow, Scotland
- Position: Centre half

Youth career
- Auchtermuchty Bluebell

Senior career*
Years	Team	Apps	(Gls)
1923–1925	Newburgh West End		
1925–1927	Dundee United	53	(7)
1927–1941	Rangers	289	(5)
1941	→ Dundee United (wartime)		
1942–1943	→ St Mirren (wartime)		
1946–1947	Buckie Thistle		

International career
1934–1937	Scotland	14	(1)
1934–1935	Scottish League XI	4	(1)

Managerial career
- 1947–1949: Alloa Athletic
- * Club domestic league appearances and goals

James McMillan Simpson (29 October 1908 – 15 March 1972) was a Scottish footballer who played as a centre half. He spent most of his club career with Rangers, winning ten major honours, and made 14 appearances for the Scotland national team.

== Career ==
After playing junior football for Newburgh West End, Jimmy Simpson signed for Dundee United in 1925 and made his debut at the age of 17 as a wing half. A regular during the club's first two years at the top level, United could not retain him following relegation in 1927 and he was transferred to Rangers for the then sizable fee of £1,000.

At Ibrox he was initially a reserve, but was converted into a centre half and became an integral part of the team which dominated the Scottish game during the 1930s. Simpson won six League championships and four Scottish Cups, adding four Scottish League XI caps and 14 full international caps to his collection. He also qualified as an engineer, which became his vocation after he had finished playing.

Simpson left Rangers in 1941, making wartime appearances for Dundee United, and would also play in unofficial competitions for St Mirren before retiring from playing. In 1946 he took up a player–coach role with Highland League club Buckie Thistle. He was appointed manager of Alloa Athletic on 19 December 1947, but left the club by mutual agreement on 19 February 1949.

== Personal life ==
His son Ronnie, a goalkeeper, also played for Scotland and was part of the Celtic side which won the 1967 European Cup Final.

== Honours ==
Rangers

- Scottish League (6): 1930–31, 1932–33, 1933–34, 1934–35, 1936–37, 1938–39
- Scottish Cup (4): 1931–32, 1933–34, 1934–35, 1935–36
- Glasgow Cup (6): 1931–32, 1932–33, 1933–34, 1935–36, 1936–37, 1937–38

== See also ==
- List of Scotland national football team captains
- List of Scottish football families
