= David Kinnear =

Scottish footballer

Personal information
- Date of birth: 22 February 1917
- Place of birth: Kirkcaldy, Scotland
- Date of death: 4 February 2008 (aged 90)
- Place of death: Glasgow, Scotland
- Position: Outside left

Senior career*
Years	Team	Apps	(Gls)
1933–1934	Raith Rovers	21	(14)
1934–1946	Rangers	105	(32)
1946	Third Lanark	4	(0)
1946–1949	Dunfermline Athletic	65	(16)
1949–1950	Stirling Albion	3	(0)
Total		198	(62)

International career
1936–1938	Scottish League XI	2	(0)
1937	Scotland	1	(1)
- * Club domestic league appearances and goals

David Kinnear (22 February 1917 – 4 February 2008) was a Scottish professional footballer.

== Career ==
Kinnear was signed to Rangers in 1934 by Bill Struth, having previously been playing for Raith Rovers and Burntisland United before that. He made his debut on 25 August 1934 in a league match against Dundee, which ended in a 3–2 defeat. He only made four appearances in the 1934–35 season. His first goal came a season later on 14 August 1935 against Albion Rovers.

Kinnear gained his one and only Scotland cap in an international challenge match against Czechoslovakia on 8 February 1937, in which he scored.

With the outbreak of the Second World War, Kinnear served with the British Army in the Army Physical Training Corps and was to leave Rangers after the war in May 1946. During his spell with the club he made 109 competitive appearances and scored 32 goals. He won two Scottish league championships, one Glasgow Cup and one Charity Cup. Along with Alex Venters, Kinnear scored in front of the all-time record crowd at Ibrox in a 2–1 victory over Old Firm rivals Celtic. He also enjoyed wartime spells with Third Lanark, Dunfermline Athletic and Stirling Albion.

He returned to Ibrox in 1956 as physiotherapist and had a hand in the transfer of Harold Davis to the club, having worked with him as a patient. He later became a trainer under Scot Symon but left the club in 1970 when manager William Waddell replaced his backroom staff.
