= Billy Simpson (footballer, born 1929) =

Northern Irish footballer

Personal information
- Full name: William Joseph Simpson
- Date of birth: 12 December 1929
- Place of birth: Belfast, Northern Ireland
- Date of death: 27 January 2017 (aged 87)
- Place of death: Glasgow, Scotland
- Height: 5 ft 11 in (1.80 m)
- Position: Centre forward

Senior career*
Years	Team	Apps	(Gls)
1946–1950	Linfield	63	(41)
1950–1959	Rangers	172	(112)
1959	Stirling Albion	7	(1)
1959–1960	Partick Thistle	6	(2)
1960–1961	Oxford United	11	(3)
Total		259	(159)

International career
1951–1958	Northern Ireland	12	(5)
- * Club domestic league appearances and goals

William Joseph Simpson (12 December 1929 – 27 January 2017) was a Northern Ireland international footballer, who played for Linfield, Rangers, Stirling Albion, Partick Thistle and Oxford United.

== Career ==
Simpson signed for Rangers from Linfield for a sum of £11,500 in 1950. He spent nine years (1950–59) at Rangers making 239 appearances and scoring 163 goals. He won three championship medals and a Scottish Cup winners medal with Rangers to add to the two Irish League and two Irish Cups he won with Linfield. He left Ibrox in 1959 and spent the last couple of years of his career with Stirling Albion, Partick Thistle and (then non-league) Oxford United.

As an illustration of his popularity, in the fictional song "A Trip to Ibrox" Billy Simpson is credited with scoring twice in a "Ne'erday" Old Firm Derby at Ibrox. Whereby Rangers were 1–0 down at half time, and Simpson inspired his team to a second half comeback after Willie Waddell had scored an equaliser.

In recognition of his service to that club, Simpson has been made a member of the Rangers F.C. Hall of Fame.

Simpson made his debut for Northern Ireland in 1951 against Wales, scoring in the process. He represented his country twelve times in total between 1951 and 1958, scoring 5 goals. He was selected in Northern Ireland's squad for the 1958 FIFA World Cup in Sweden but a late injury ensured he did not play at all during the finals.

In April 2015, the feature-length documentary Spirit of '58 was screened as part of the Belfast Film Festival. It featured Billy Simpson prominently alongside the other surviving players (Billy Bingham, Peter McParland, Jimmy McIlroy and Harry Gregg) as it told the story of Northern Ireland's journey throughout the 1950s under the managership of Peter Doherty, culminating in the 1958 World Cup.
