= Tom Vallance =

Scottish footballer

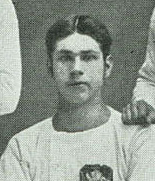

Personal information
- Full name: Thomas Vallance
- Date of birth: 27 May 1856
- Place of birth: Renton, Scotland
- Date of death: 16 February 1935 (aged 78)
- Place of death: Glasgow, Scotland
- Position: Right-back

Senior career*
Years	Team	Apps	(Gls)
1874–1882	Rangers		
1884	Rangers		

International career
1877–1881	Scotland	7	(0)
- * Club domestic league appearances and goals

Thomas Vallance (27 May 1856 – 16 February 1935) was a Scottish footballer. He made 38 Scottish Cup appearances for the Rangers club.

== Football ==
Before football, Vallance was a rower. He was noted as being abnormally tall for the times but was only around six feet two inches. He played at right-back for the Rangers from 1874 to 1882. He left Scotland on 22 February 1882 to take a position in Calcutta. He embarked on a career in the tea plantations of Assam but returned after a year suffering from blackwater fever.

Vallance was also capped at international level, making seven appearances for Scotland between 1877 and 1881.
