= John Little (footballer) =

Scottish footballer (1930–2017)

Personal information
- Full name: Robert John Little
- Date of birth: 8 July 1930
- Place of birth: Calgary, Alberta, Canada
- Date of death: 18 January 2017 (aged 86)
- Position: Left back

Senior career*
Years	Team	Apps	(Gls)
1948–1951	Queen's Park	55	(0)
1951–1962	Rangers	178	(1)
1962–1963	Morton	14	(0)
Total		247	(1)

International career
1953	Scotland	1	(0)
1954–1960	Scottish League XI	2	(0)
1955	Scotland A vs B trial	1	(0)
1960	SFL trial v SFA	1	(0)
- * Club domestic league appearances and goals

Robert John Little (8 July 1930 – 18 January 2017) was a Scottish footballer who played as a defender for Queen's Park, Rangers, Morton and the Scotland national team.

== Football career ==
Little was born in Calgary, Alberta, but grew up in Scotland in Millport, Isle of Cumbrae. He started his career with Queen's Park, making 55 league appearances. He joined Rangers in 1951, and he made a total of 275 appearances, scoring once. His only ever goal for the club came in a 1–1 draw with Hamilton Academical in March 1954. During his time at Ibrox he won two League championships in 1952–53 and 1955–56 (he made insufficient appearances in two other title-winning seasons) and two Scottish Cups in 1953 and 1960. He left Rangers at the end of the 1961–62 season, moving to Morton, where he finished his career.

Little won one cap for the Scotland national team, against Sweden in 1953. Little also played for the Scottish League XI twice.

== Post-playing career ==
Little went on to teach physical education at St Columba's Greenock in the late 1960s and at the Sacred Heart Secondary in Paisley in the early 1970s. He died on 18 January 2017, aged 86.

== See also ==
- List of Scotland international footballers born outside Scotland
