= Sam English =

Northern Irish footballer

Personal information
- Date of birth: 18 August 1908
- Place of birth: Crevolea, Ireland
- Date of death: 12 April 1967 (aged 58)
- Place of death: Alexandria, Scotland
- Height: 5 ft 9 in (1.75 m)
- Position: Striker

Youth career
- 1929–1931: Yoker Athletic

Senior career*
Years	Team	Apps	(Gls)
1931–1933	Rangers	60	(54)
1933–1935	Liverpool	47	(24)
1935–1936	Queen of the South	24	(8)
1936–1938	Hartlepool United	69	(27)
Total		200	(113)

International career
1932	Ireland	2	(1)
- * Club domestic league appearances and goals

Samuel English (18 August 1908 – 12 April 1967) was a Northern Irish footballer who played for several clubs during the 1930s, but is mainly remembered for his time with Rangers. English also won two international caps for Ireland.

His career was overshadowed by the death of Celtic goalkeeper John Thomson who died as a result of an accidental collision with English during an Old Firm game in 1931.

== Early life ==
Samuel English was born in the hamlet of Crevolea in Aghadowey, Ireland. In 1924 his family moved to Dalmuir in Scotland, and for a time he worked at the John Brown & Company Shipyard.

== Club career ==
English began his career with Junior side Yoker Athletic before joining Rangers in July 1931. He holds the Rangers record for the most league goals scored in one season: 44 goals from 35 appearances in his debut season of 1931–32. English scored 53 goals in all competitions that season, including a five-goal haul against Morton, four goals against Queens Park and hat-tricks against Dundee United, Leith Athletic, Falkirk, Brechin City, Ayr United and Raith Rovers. English won the Scottish Cup final in 1932, with him scoring Rangers' second goal in a 3–0 win over Kilmarnock. English was less prolific the following season, but still scored 11 goals in 30 league and cup matches, helping Rangers to win the Scottish League Championship.

English's career was overshadowed by an incident on 5 September 1931 where he was involved in a collision with John Thomson, the Celtic goalkeeper. Thomson dived for the ball and his head collided with English's knee (not his boot, as sometimes claimed). Thomson suffered serious injuries to his skull and died in hospital a few hours later. The official enquiry found that the collision was an accident, and cleared English of any blame; a view which was fully supported by Thomson's family and all players from both teams who were on the field at the time. Nevertheless, English was deeply traumatised by what had happened to Thomson.

Although he was cleared of malice in the Thomson incident, jeering by Scottish crowds caused his move to England. English signed for Liverpool in the summer of 1933 for a transfer fee of £8,000. He began the season in fine form and had scored 16 goals by the half-way stage. However he played less regularly as the season progressed, but still scored a further four goals to finish the season with 20 goals in 31 league and cup appearances. The following season saw English in and out of the team, and he could only score six goals in 19 games.

In 1935 the recently appointed Queen of the South manager George McLachlan took English back north to Scotland for a spell at the Dumfries-based club. The move was not a success and English was given a free transfer to Hartlepools United in July 1936. He was to find that his reputation had preceded him, he often faced taunts regarding the death of Thomson, and he never fully recovered his playing form despite scoring 31 goals in 75 appearances for Hartlepools. Eventually he retired from football at the age of 28, and was quoted afterwards as describing his playing career after the Thomson accident as being "seven years of joyless sport."

== International career ==
English won two full international caps in 1932 for Ireland. He made his debut in a home game at Windsor Park, Belfast on 17 September 1932, losing 4–0 to Scotland. English won his second and last cap on 7 December 1932, in a 4–1 defeat away against Wales with English scoring Ireland's goal.

== Later life and legacy ==
After retiring from playing, English worked as a coach for Duntocher Hibs and Yoker Athletic before finding employment in a shipyard.

English died in the Vale of Leven Hospital in Alexandria, at the age of 58 after battling motor neurone disease.

In recognition of his prolific goal-scoring exploits during his two seasons at Rangers, English was added to the club's Hall of Fame in 2009. Members of his family and Rangers supporters also commissioned silversmith Cara Murphy to produce a commemorative silver bowl containing 44 silver balls, each ball representing the 44 goals English scored in his record-setting first season at Ibrox. The Sam English Bowl was then presented to Rangers and is now awarded yearly to the club's top-scorer in a season. The first winner of the bowl was Kris Boyd in May 2009.

== Honours ==
Rangers

- Scottish Division One: 1932–33
- Scottish Cup: 1932
- Glasgow Cup: 1931–32, 1932–33
