= Bobby Main =

Scottish footballer

Personal information
- Full name: Robert Frame Main
- Date of birth: 10 February 1909
- Place of birth: Airdrie, Scotland
- Date of death: 30 March 1985 (aged 76)
- Place of death: Airdrie, Scotland
- Position: Right winger

Senior career*
Years	Team	Apps	(Gls)
- Baillieston Juniors
1929–1939	Rangers	139	(31)
1939–1941	New Brighton	0	(0)

International career
1934–1935	Scottish League XI	3	(0)
1937	Scotland	1	(0)
- * Club domestic league appearances and goals

Robert Frame Main (10 February 1909 – 30 March 1985) was a Scottish professional footballer who played mainly as an outside right and is best known for his time with Rangers.

Main began his career at local team Baillieston Juniors and joined Rangers in October 1929, initially as understudy to Sandy Archibald. He was in and out of the side for four years before becoming a regular in 1933. During his spell at the club he won four Scottish league championships, two Scottish Cups, three Glasgow Cups and two Charity Cups. He made 175 appearances for Rangers and scored 38 goals. He left Ibrox in May 1939 aged 30 and joined New Brighton, but the outbreak of the Second World War curtailed his football career.

He played once for Scotland in 1937 against Wales, having been part of a SFA tour of North America two years earlier, playing in five matches including two unofficial internationals against the United States. He also played for the Scottish Football League XI on three occasions, facing the English Football League XI each time.

Main died on 30 March 1985, aged 76.
