= Jimmy Fleming (footballer, born 1901) =

Scottish footballer

Personal information
- Full name: James William Fleming
- Date of birth: 5 December 1901
- Place of birth: Dennistoun, Scotland
- Date of death: May 13, 1969 (aged 67)
- Height: 5 ft 9 in (1.75 m)
- Position: Centre forward

Senior career*
Years	Team	Apps	(Gls)
–	Shettleston		
1923–1925	St Johnstone	72	(42)
1925–1934	Rangers	225	(176)
1934–1936	Ayr United	42	(17)

International career
1929–1930	Scotland	3	(3)
1934	Scottish Football League XI	1	(0)
- * Club domestic league appearances and goals

James William Fleming (5 December 1901 – 13 May 1969) was a Scottish footballer who played for St Johnstone, Rangers and Ayr United as a centre forward.

== Career ==
Fleming made his Rangers debut against Dundee in October 1925 and scored in a 2–1 defeat at Ibrox. His last appearance was in October 1934 against Queen of the South.

He holds the record for the most Scottish Cup goals scored by a Rangers player, with 44, as well as the record of having scored the most goals in a single match for Rangers, scoring nine times in a 14–2 Scottish Cup win against Blairgowrie in 1934.

He represented Scotland three times between 1929 and 1930, scoring three goals. Two of these goals were scored in a 5–2 defeat by England at Wembley.

== See also ==
- List of footballers in Scotland by number of league goals (200+)
