= Whitey McDonald =

Footballer (1902–1956)

Personal information
- Full name: Robert Logan McDonald
- Date of birth: 11 August 1902
- Place of birth: Omagh, Ireland
- Date of death: 7 June 1956 (aged 53)
- Place of death: Millport, Scotland
- Height: 5 ft 8 1/2 in (1.74 m)
- Positions: Wing half; left-back

Senior career*
Years	Team	Apps	(Gls)
- Hamilton Thistle
- Toronto Ulster
1924–1928	Bethlehem Steel	119	(7)
1928–1938	Rangers	185	(1)

International career
1930–1932	Ireland	2	(0)
- * Club domestic league appearances and goals

Robert Logan "Whitey" McDonald (11 August 1902 – 7 June 1956) was an association football (soccer) player who earned two caps for Ireland. He began his professional career in Canada, spent four seasons in the American Soccer League, then finished it in Scotland with Rangers.

== Club career ==
Born in Ireland, McDonald moved with his parents to Canada when he was two, growing up in Hamilton, Ontario. The nickname "Whitey" was given to him in reference to the colour of his hair, which was a light reddish-blonde. He began his professional career with Hamilton Thistle, playing in Spectator Cup in 1921 and 1922. He also spent time with Toronto Ulster United before signing with Bethlehem Steel of the American Soccer League in 1924. He played four seasons with Bethlehem.

In 1928, Scottish club Rangers toured the U.S. and spotted McDonald in its game with Bethlehem. They signed him in 1928 and he spent ten seasons with the Glasgow club, making over 200 appearances in the Scottish Football League (finishing as champions six times) and the Scottish Cup (which he won twice, in 1934 and 1935). While a wing back in Canada and the U.S., he played left full-back for Rangers.

== International career ==
McDonald earned two caps with the Ireland national team. His first was against Scotland in 1930 and the second against England in 1932. In June 1935, he returned to North America with a touring Scottish squad, official eligibility rules not applying; he had also been back in Canada five years earlier with Rangers, captaining the tourists against former club Hamilton Thistle who were led by his brother 'Red'.

McDonald was enshrined in the Canadian Soccer Hall of Fame as an inaugural inductee in 2000.
