= Dougie Gray =

Scottish footballer (1905–1972)

Personal information
- Full name: Douglas Herbert Gray
- Date of birth: 4 April 1905
- Place of birth: Alford, Aberdeenshire, Scotland
- Date of death: 1972 (aged 66–67)
- Place of death: Glasgow, Scotland
- Position: Right back

Senior career*
Years	Team	Apps	(Gls)
–	Mugiemoss		
1925–1947	Rangers	490	(2)

International career
1927–1930	Scottish Football League XI	6	(0)
1928–1932	Scotland	10	(0)
- * Club domestic league appearances and goals

Douglas Herbert Gray (4 April 1905 – 1972) was a Scottish footballer who spent his entire senior career with Rangers and is the longest serving player in the Glasgow club's history.

== Career ==
=== Club ===
Born in Alford, Aberdeenshire, Gray joined the Ibrox club from Aberdeen Mugiemoss in June 1925. A right back, he played for the club 555 times in competitive matches between 1925 and 1946, earning ten league championship and six Scottish Cup winner's medals. Taking into account his appearances in war-time matches and friendlies, he made 940 appearances for the club in all, wearing the shirt more times than any other player, though John Greig is the record holder for appearances in official matches. After leaving Rangers, he acted as a coach at Clyde.

Gray is a member of the Rangers Hall of Fame.

=== International ===
Gray won ten international caps for the Scotland national football team and made six appearances for the Scottish League representative side.
