= Jimmy Smith (footballer, born 1911) =

Scottish footballer

Personal information
- Date of birth: 24 September 1911
- Place of birth: Slamannan, Scotland
- Date of death: 4 December 2003 (aged 92)
- Position: Centre forward

Youth career
- Argyll Rob Roy

Senior career*
Years	Team	Apps	(Gls)
1928	East Stirlingshire	15	(16)
1928–1946	Rangers	234	(225)
Total		249	(241)

International career
1934–1937	Scotland	2	(1)
1941	Scotland (wartime)	3	(0)
1941	Scottish League XI	1	(0)
- * Club domestic league appearances and goals

James Smith (24 September 1911 – 4 December 2003) was a Scottish professional footballer, who played for East Stirlingshire and Rangers. During his time at Rangers he scored 249 goals in 259 games.

== Club career ==
Smith moved from East Stirlingshire to Rangers aged 17 in December 1928, having scored more than a goal per game in Scottish Division Two during his five-month spell at Firs Park, and made his professional debut against Hamilton Academical in March 1929. He was only selected twice in his first season at Ibrox and just once the following season, although he scored in that match, a 3–1 win against Dundee. In season 1930–31, he scored 21 goals in 21 games, including five in an 8–0 defeat of Clyde, as Rangers won the League championship for the fifth season running.

After Rangers missed out on a sixth successive title in season 1931–32 (during which Smith only featured eight games, scoring five times), the championship returned to Ibrox the following season and Smith finished top scorer with 34 goals, including four hat-tricks.

In season 1933–34, Smith and striking partner Bob McPhail, notched up 72 goals between them in 47 games as Rangers continued their dominance of Scottish football. Smith also collected his first Scottish Cup medal, scoring in a 5–0 defeat of St Mirren in the final at Hampden.

Success for Smith and Rangers continued. The League title was again won in 1934–35 with Smith scoring 36 goals in 32 matches, including six in a 7–1 defeat of Dunfermline Athletic. He also collected his second Scottish Cup medal, scoring twice in the 2–1 against Hamilton Academical in the final. Rangers went on to win two of the next four League championships before World War II and Smith was Rangers' top scorer in three of the four, including 31 goals from 38 games in the 1936–37 success.

Smith continued to play for Rangers during the unofficial matches played during the war (scoring 100 further goals) but retired from football upon the return of official domestic football in 1946–47. After he retired he continued as a club trainer then chief scout until 1967.

== International career ==
Despite his incredible goalscoring record, he only ever won two caps for Scotland, both against Ireland. He won his first cap on 20 October 1934 in a 2–1 defeat in Belfast and his second cap was on 10 November 1937, where Smith scored the equaliser in a 1–1 draw at Pittodrie. He made three appearances in unofficial internationals during World War II, all in 1941, and played once in the same year for the Scottish Football League XI (though this was also unofficial to an extent, being a RAF Benevolent Fund fixture with Scotland represented by the wartime Southern League).

== See also ==
- List of footballers in Scotland by number of league goals (200+)
