= Met Tower =

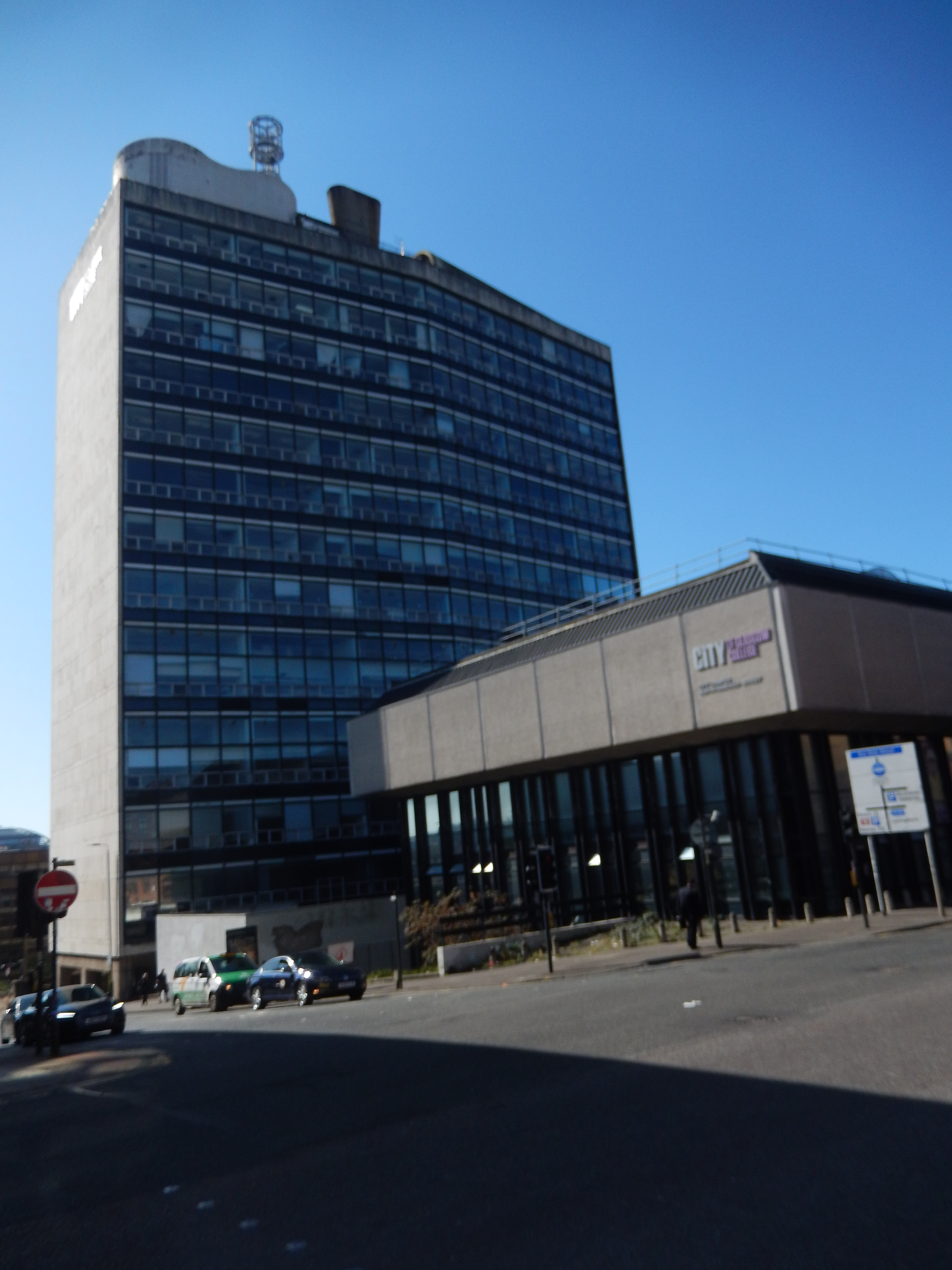
- The north elevation of the Met Tower taken in 2019. The podium structure in the foreground was demolished in 2023.
- Former names: Glasgow College of Building and Printing; Glasgow Metropolitan College

General information
- Status: Completed
- Type: Academic
- Architectural style: Modernist
- Location: 60 North Hanover Street, Glasgow, Scotland
- Coordinates: 55.8634°N 4.2463°W
- Year built: 1961-64
- Completed: 1964
- Renovated: 2023–present
- Owner: Vita Group

Height
- Roof: 74.7 metres (245 ft)

Technical details
- Structural system: Reinforced Concrete
- Floor count: 15
- Lifts/elevators: 4

Design and construction
- Architect: Peter Williams
- Architecture firm: Wyllie, Shanks and Underwood
- Main contractor: Melville, Dundas & Whitson

Listed Building – Category B
- Official name: 60 NORTH HANOVER STREET AND 63 NORTH FREDERICK STREET, GLASGOW COLLEGE OF BUILDING AND PRINTING
- Designated: 14 February 2002
- Reference no.: LB48414

The Met Tower is a 15 storey high rise building located in the city centre Glasgow, the largest city in Scotland. Opened in 1964, it is amongst one of the tallest buildings in Glasgow, currently ranked third, and was the first high rise to be constructed in Scotland for the purposes of tertiary education. It served as the main building of the former Glasgow Metropolitan College under the name Stow College of Building, later becoming commonly known as the Glasgow College of Building and Printing.

The tower is a major landmark in Glasgow city centre, overlooking George Square, and is one of the city's celebrated Modernist buildings. Its distinctive roof structures were directly influenced by Le Corbusier's famous La Cité Radieuse block in Marseille. It currently holds Grade-B listed status, and as of 2025 is owned by the property company Vita Group after an aborted plan to convert the building into an office block by Bruntwood SciTech.

== Construction and History ==
=== Background and completion ===
The tower was constructed for Glasgow Corporation by Melville, Dundas & Whitson between 1961 and 1964 as part of the new campus for the Stow College of Building – in 1972 this entity merged with the Stow College of Printing to form the Glasgow College of Building and Printing (GCBP).

It was designed by Peter Williams of the local architectural firm Wyllie, Shanks and Underwood, responsible for many large academic buildings constructed in the area at the time such as the adjacent Central College of Commerce (with which the tower shares close aesthetic similarities, the two buildings are essentially "sisters" of each other), and the James Weir Building of the University of Strathclyde.

=== Architecture and design ===
Like many high rise structures of the time, the building's aesthetic was influenced by the work of Le Corbusier, and Williams is cited as this being one of his major influences on his design. Williams was praised for his successful interpretation of Le Corbusier's famous Unité d'habitation housing block in Marseille, but into the design of an educational tower, with characteristic features such as the gable end walls being clad in white Italian Travertine slabs and exposed pilotis at the tower's base. Another feature taken directly from Le Corbusier's work is a rooftop gymnasium housed within a distinctive penthouse structure - often nicknamed the "upturned boat". Similar to its contemporary - the nearby Livingstone Tower which was built during the same period - the tower featured high speed elevators and electric heating. The building was opened by the then Prime Minister Harold Wilson on 24 April 1964.

The podium block, which was added to the north of the site and contained an assembly hall and canteen, was constructed in 1969.

=== Legacy ===
The tower was granted Grade B listed status on 14 February 2002 by Historic Scotland on account of its "outstanding importance due to the high calibre of design and construction as well as retention of original features".

=== Recent history ===
In February 2005, Glasgow Metropolitan College was formed by the merger of the GCBP and Glasgow College of Food Technology, administered from the GCBP building; it then merged with Central College and Glasgow College of Nautical Studies in 2010 to create the City of Glasgow College. Thus the retronym Met Tower was applied to the building.

The tower remained in use until summer 2016, when the construction of the new City of Glasgow College 'supercampus' on nearby Cathedral Street rendered it redundant. As part of the 2014 Commonwealth Games the tower was used to display a giant pink advertising placard entitled People Make Glasgow (at the time the city's marketing slogan) visible from George Square.

== Future Developments ==
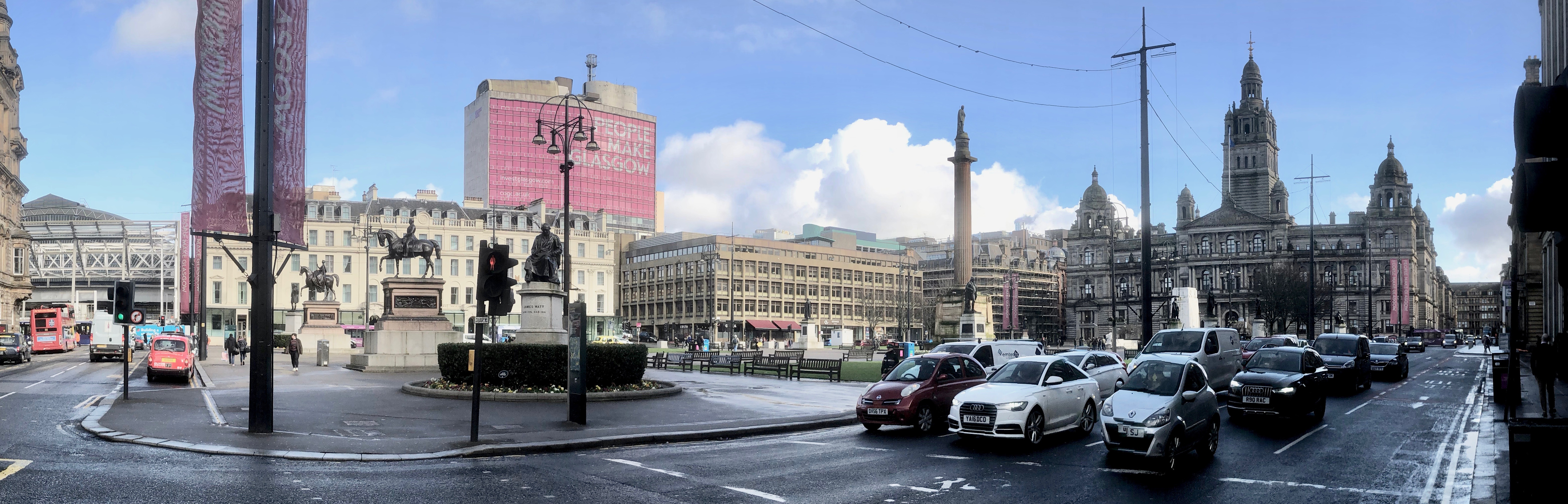
The south elevation of the tower in 2019 from George Square, showing the "People Make Glasgow" placard.

In 2022, it was revealed that development company Bruntwood SciTech had purchased the campus for £16.2M with a plan to repurpose the tower as office space for new technology start-ups. As well as restoring the building's exterior, the rooftop gymnasium was to be converted into a private events space. An adjoining smaller tower was to be constructed to the north, containing additional offices, with a plaza connecting the two buildings containing leisure and retail facilities. The new complex was scheduled to open in mid-2025 and soft stripping of the tower began in January 2023, with demolition of the podium block taking place over the summer of 2023.

In May 2024, however, it was announced that the project had been cancelled and the owner, in collaboration with Glasgow City Council, were looking for a new use for the site. In August 2025, it was announced that Vita Group had purchased the building from Bruntwood SciTech for an undisclosed sum, with the intention of converting it into a co-living development targeted at young professionals.
