= George Boardman =

George Boardman may refer to:

- George Boardman (missionary) (1801–1831), American missionary
- George Boardman the Younger (1828–1903), his son, American Baptist theologian and writer
- George Boardman (footballer, born 1904) (1904–1969), Scottish professional footballer
- George Boardman (footballer, born 1943), Scottish professional footballer
- George Augustus Boardman (1818–1901), American ornithologist
