= Unité d'habitation =

Modernist style of residential housing

Coordinates: 43.2613°N 5.3963°E

East elevation Unité d'Habitation Marseille (La Cité Radieuse)

Roof terrace of La Cité Radieuse, Marseille

Roof terrace of the Unité d'Habitation in Marseille

Interior of La Cité Radieuse, Marseille

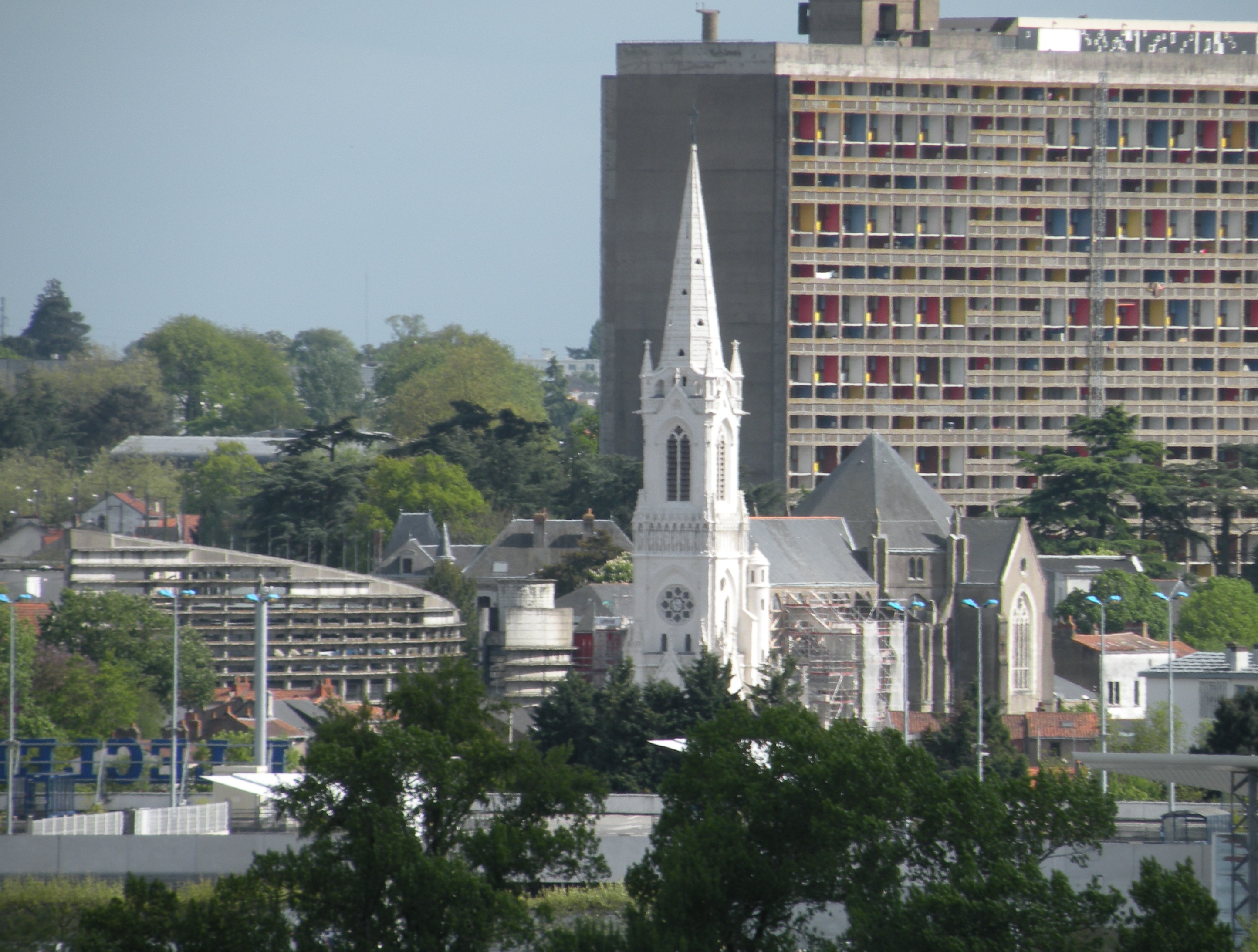
Unité d'Habitation of Nantes-Rezé in the background

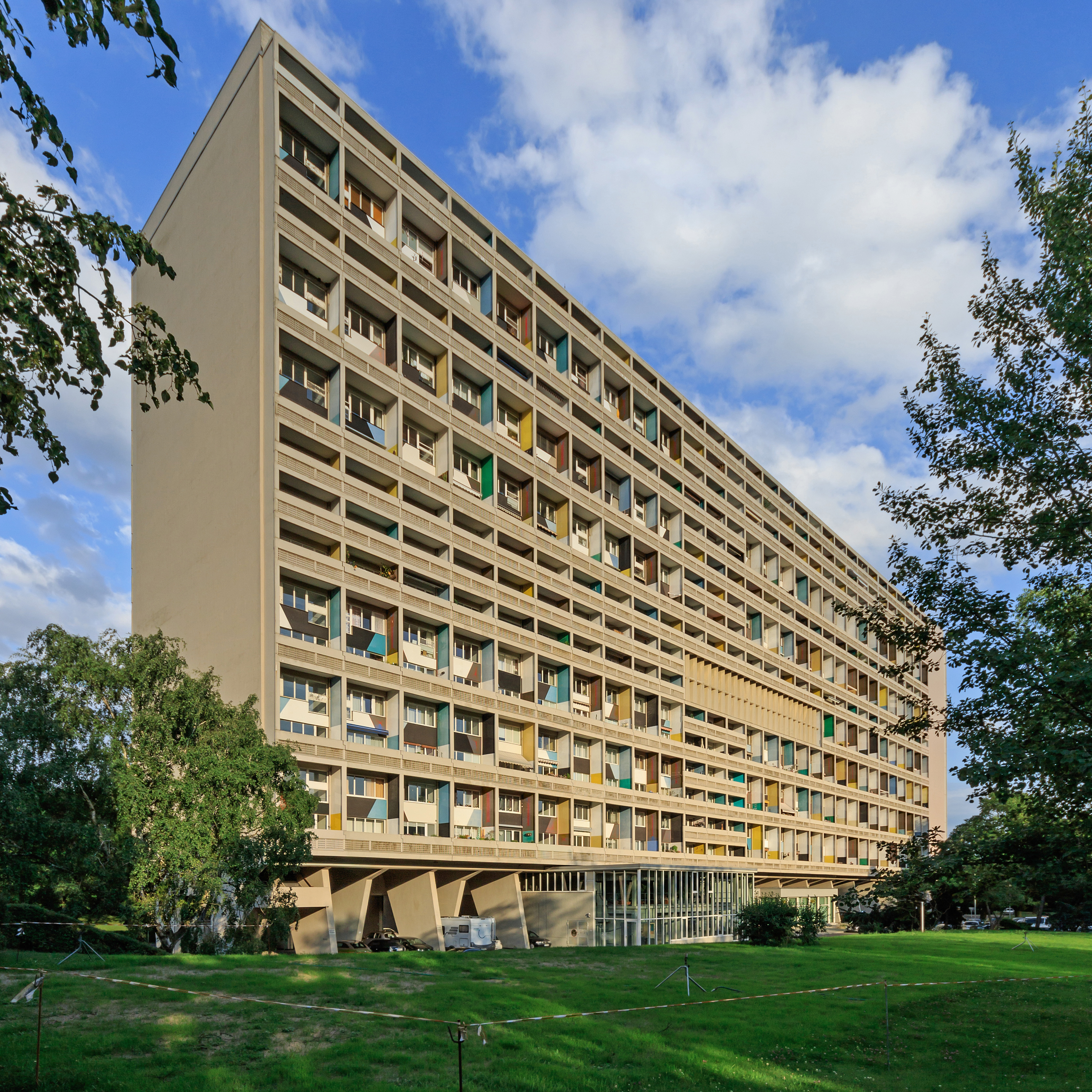
Le Corbusier's Berlin Unité

The Unité d'habitation (French pronunciation: [ynite dabitasjɔ̃], Housing Unit; Occitan: Unitat d'abitacion) is a modernist residential housing typology developed by Le Corbusier, with the collaboration of painter-architect Nadir Afonso. It formed the basis of several housing developments throughout Europe designed by Le Corbusier and sharing the same name and reached prominence in the 1950s and 60s.

The most famous of these buildings is located in the southern part of Marseille, France. It was added to the UNESCO World Heritage List in 2016 because of its importance to the development of modernist architecture, along with 16 other works by Le Corbusier. It is also designated a historic monument by the French Ministry of Culture. It was damaged by fire on 9 February 2012.

== History ==
In 1920, Le Corbusier started to develop the Unité d'habitation type, which became influential in 20th century modernism and contemporary residential design in Europe. The first realizations were built in Paris and Marseille in the 1940s as high-rise concrete structures. During the construction of the Marseille building, a few model apartments were built and furnished for visitors as an exhibition.

In the 1980s, a team from ETH Zurich surveyed several apartments in Marseille and built several full-scale models for exhibitions in Paris, Karlsruhe, Tokyo and New York. In 1986, a full-scale model was constructed at the Badischer Kunstverein by Gernot Bayne based on the survey of Ruggero Tropeano. The same model was then on display at Centre Pompidou. A full scale original kitchen, stairs, and other parts of the apartments are stored and displayed in several museum collections around the world. The Museum of Modern Art (MoMA) in New York acquired a complete kitchen in 2013. In 2007, students built a structurally correct full-scale model inside the museum "Cité de l'Architecture et du Patrimoine" in Paris. Unité d'habitation model apartments have been rebuilt in exhibitions or renovated in their historic style.

== La Cité Radieuse, Marseille ==
The first and most famous of the Unité d'habitation buildings is in Marseille, France, and was built between 1947 and 1952. One of Le Corbusier's most famous works, it proved enormously influential and is often cited as the initial inspiration for the Brutalist architectural style and philosophy.

The Marseille building, developed with Le Corbusier's designers Shadrach Woods and George Candilis, comprises 337 apartments of 23 different layouts across 12 storeys, and all supported by large pilotis. The building also incorporates shops including an architectural bookshop, a rooftop gallery, educational facilities, a hotel that is open to the public, and a restaurant, "Le Ventre de l'Architecte" ("The Belly of the Architect"). The building is constructed in béton brut (rough-cast concrete), as the hoped-for steel frame proved too expensive due to the post-war steel shortage.

Inside, wide corridors ("streets in the sky") run along the central long axis of every third floor of the building. Each apartment lies on two levels, such that the room on one side of a corridor belongs to the apartment that is mostly below the corridor floor, while that on the opposite side belongs to the apartment above. On those floors without corridors, the apartments stretch from one side of the building to the other, and each has a balcony on the western side.

The flat roof is designed as a communal terrace with sculptural ventilation stacks, a running track, and a shallow paddling pool for children. There is also a children's art school in the atelier. The roof, where a number of theatrical performances have taken place, was renovated in 2010 and 2022, and since 2013 it has hosted an exhibition center headed by designer Ora-Ïto called the MaMo. The roof has unobstructed views of the Mediterranean Sea and Marseille.

According to Peter Blake, members of CIAM held a "great celebration" for the building's opening on its roof, on a summer evening in 1953. "Architects from every part of the world attended", including Walter Gropius, who said at the event: "Any architect who does not find this building beautiful, had better lay down his pencil." Chanel's Cruise collection, featuring motifs from the building and Le Corbusier's sketches, was held on the rooftop in May 2024, and an exhibition of works by American artist, Sterling Ruby, in collaboration with Larry Gagosian, was on view in the summer of 2025. "

Le Corbusier's design was criticised by US architect Peter Blake for having small children's rooms, some without windows. In the 1980 documentary The Shock of the New, Robert Hughes argued that it had "one of the great rooves of the world" that conceptually reflected Le Corbusier's admiration for the Acropolis, but criticized other aspects of the building, including the unused space underneath and the small dwellings. Unlike many of the blocks it inspired, which lack the original's generous proportions, communal facilities and parkland setting, the Unité is popular with its residents and is now mainly occupied by upper middle-class professionals.

== Interiors ==
The apartments were equipped with built-in furniture, and specially designed storage walls with various cupboards with sliding doors, which were designed by Charlotte Perriand in collaboration with Atelier Le Corbusier. Additionally Perriand collaborated on the design of the apartment kitchens, 321 of the 337 units were equipped with the Cuisine Atelier Le Corbusier, type 1 kitchens, many of which are still in place due to their efficient use of space. The steel stairs and the aluminium kitchen counters were designed by Jean Prouvé. Unité d'habitation model apartments have been renovated in the individual historic Unité buildings as well as rebuilt in exhibitions around the world.

The units themselves were designed so each resident had an upstairs and downstairs space, with the upper unit fitting with the lower like a puzzle piece. The apartments were designed to be modular in nature and easy to industrially move in as one piece.

== Other buildings and influences ==
In the block's planning, the architect drew on his study of a Soviet communal housing project, the Narkomfin Building in Moscow, designed by the architect Moisei Ginzburg and completed in 1932.

Le Corbusier's design for utopian high density housing for cities was repeated in four more buildings with the same name and a very similar design:

- Unité d'habitation of Nantes-Rezé in 1955,
- Unité d'habitation of Berlin in 1957,
- Unité d'habitation of Briey in 1963,
- Unité d'habitation of Firminy-Vert in 1965.

All were oriented with the building's long axis running north–south, so the units face east and west.

The replacement of steel by rough-cast concrete (béton brut) was a key element that seeded the Brutalist Movement. The Unité d'habitation inspired many brutalist housing complexes. English iterations on the Unité concept include Chamberlin, Powell and Bon's Barbican Estate (completed 1982), Gordon Tait's Samuda Estate, Isle of Dogs (1965), Ernő Goldfinger's Balfron Tower (1967), and Trellick Tower (1972), all in London. The triple-level roof garden of Great Arthur House (1957) (see Golden Lane Estate), designed by Chamberlin, Powell and Bon, was inspired by Le Corbusier's Unité d'Habitation and is a fine vantage point towards St Paul's Cathedral and the Barbican Estate and has panoramic views across London. A roof terrace for the tenants was furnished with a decorative pool, seats, plant boxes, and a distinctive concrete canopy and pergola. The estate was popular with professionals and is still a self-sufficient 'urban village'. It is seen as the most successful of England's housing developments from the early 1950s.

The apartment building Polska Akademia Nauk (Polish Academy of Sciences) in 20 Wiejska Street in Warsaw, Poland was inspired by Le Corbusier's principles. The architect was Jerzy Gieysztor and the building was completed in 1964. Among central European countries, it is unique for its period. It is an abstract sculptural building that floats over anthropomorphic concrete pillars (pilotis). All its apartments are spacious, there is an indoor shopping mall, and the roof terrace has a swimming pool. This building was also inspired by the Polish pavilion from the 1937 World Expo in Paris, especially the sandstone wall relief and the entrance roof with round holes. Other Polish buildings inspired by the Unité d'Habitation include the Za Żelazną Bramą Housing Estate (Behind the Iron Gate) in Warsaw, and Superjednostka in Katowice, built in the 1970s.

In Scotland, the Glasgow College of Building and Printing (1964), and the Charles Oakley Building, (1963)—both former buildings of the City of Glasgow College—were designed in the late 1950s by architect Peter Williams of the local firm Walter Underwood & Partners. They are non-residential educational blocks that differ greatly from Le Corbusier's Unité d'Habitation, inside and outside. Yet the roof terrace of the Unité d'Habitation in Marseille inspired Peter Williams to design the rooftops of these college buildings with gymnasia. Both buildings are now Grade II listed, with the Building and Printing College (now known as the 'Met Tower') is as of 2023 undergoing restoration and conversion into office space

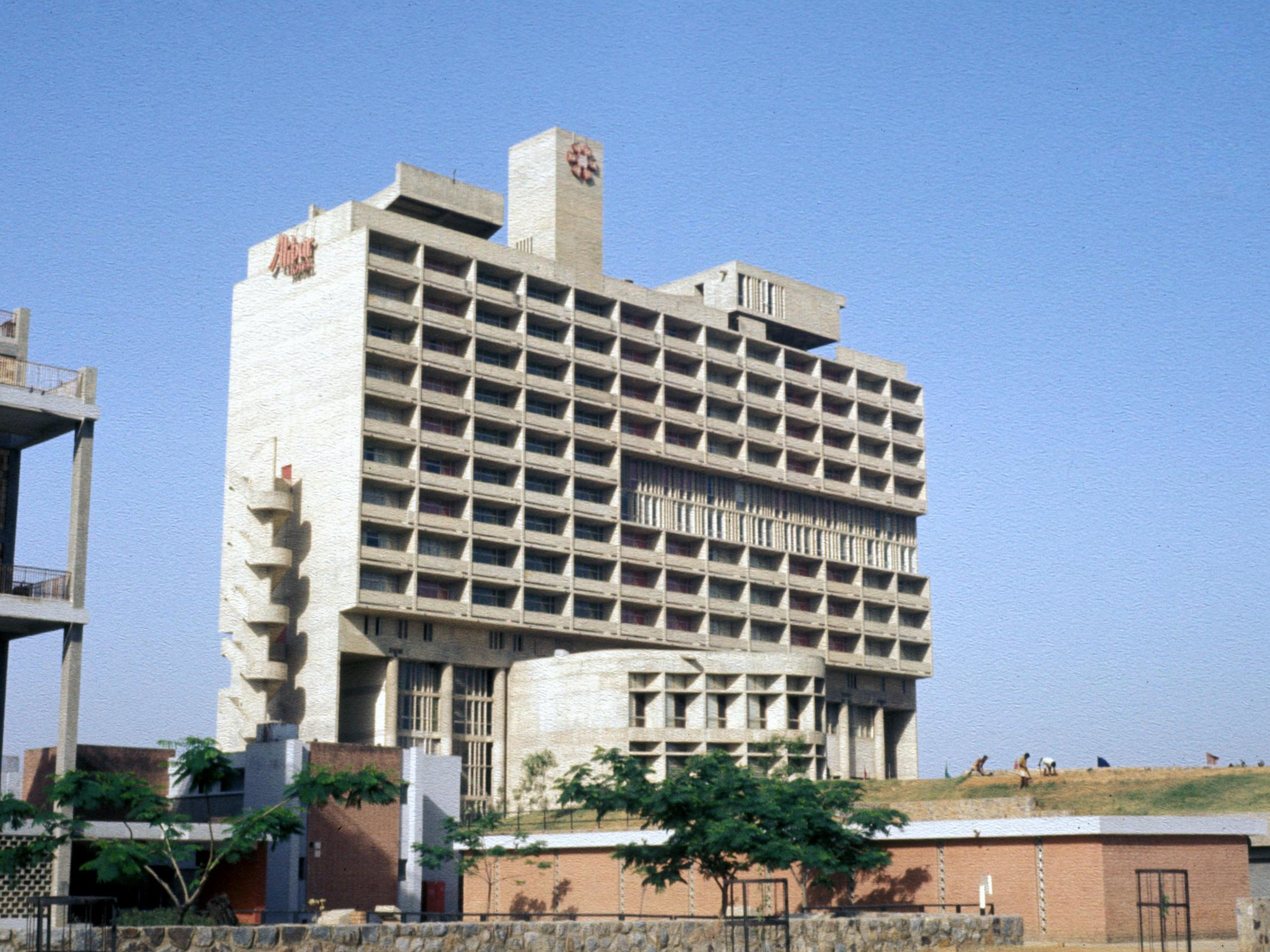
Akbar Hotel in Chanakyapuri, New Delhi constructed 1965-1969

Other examples of buildings that drew inspiration from Le Corbusier's Unité d'habitation in Marseille are:

- A building (1954) in Vukovarska street in Zagreb, designed by architect Drago Galić.
- The Super Andrija building (1973) designed by architect Miroslav Cantinelli (Siget, Novi Zagreb, Siget Street 18) and The Mamutica (Mammoth) building (1974) designed by architects Đuro Mirković and Nevenka Postružnik (Travno, Novi Zagreb, Božidara Magovca Street 3-63).
- The fire-station in the Boulevard Masséna, Paris, designed by architect Jean Willerval and completed in 1971. The roof terrace has a tennis court. There is a swimming pool on the ground floor.
- The Reserve Square Complex in Cleveland, Ohio, built 1969–1973.
- The Riverside Plaza in Minneapolis, Minnesota, which opened in 1973. Its brutalist design and multi-colored panels were influenced by the Unité d'Habitation.
- The Akbar Hotel in Chanakyapuri, New Delhi was designed by Shiv Nath Prasad and constructed from 1965-69. It shares many elements.

== See also ==
- Plattenbau
- Tower block
- University Apartments (Chicago, Illinois)
- List of Brutalist structures
