= David Ness =

Scottish footballer

Personal information
- Full name: David Hogg Ness
- Date of birth: 15 August 1902
- Place of birth: Irvine, Scotland
- Date of death: 1974
- Place of death: Saltcoats, Scotland
- Height: 5 ft 8 in (1.73 m)
- Position: Outside right

Senior career*
| Years | Team | Apps | (Gls) |
| – | Irvine Meadow | | |
| 1923 | Nithsdale Wanderers | | |
| 1923–1935 | Partick Thistle | 340 | (76) |

International career
| 1934 | Scottish League XI | 1 | (1) |
- * Club domestic league appearances and goals

David Hogg Ness (15 August 1902 – 1974) was a Scottish footballer who played as an outside right; his only club at the professional level was Partick Thistle, where he spent twelve seasons (all in the top division), making 423 appearances for the Jags in all competitions and scoring 97 goals.

After gradually ousting the 1921 Scottish Cup Final goalscorer John Blair from the position, he went on to play for the club in the 1930 Scottish Cup Final which they lost to Rangers after a replay, but did manage to claim winner's medals in the Glasgow Merchants Charity Cup in 1927 and the one-off Glasgow Dental Hospital Cup in 1928, both against the same opponents. Towards the end of his spell, a replacement was signed in the shape of Alex McSpadyen, who went on to become a Scotland international within a few years.

Ness was selected once for the Scottish Football League XI, scoring in that match against the Irish League XI in 1934, and played in three editions of the Glasgow Football Association's annual challenge match against Sheffield.
