= Calderwood =

Calderwood may refer to:

== Places ==
- Almondell and Calderwood Country Park, a park in West Lothian, Scotland
- Calderwood, a housing development near East Calder in West Lothian, Scotland
- Calderwood, East Kilbride, an area of East Kilbride, Scotland
- Calderwood Dam, a reservoir and dam development project in Tennessee, United States
- Calderwood, Tennessee, a community once located near Calderwood Dam
- Calderwood, Michigan, a community in Michigan, United States
- Calderwood, Eastern Cape, a town in South Africa
- Calderwood, New South Wales, a suburb of Wollongong, Australia
- Calderwood Park, a conservation area in Mashonaland East, Zimbabwe

== Other uses ==
- Calderwood (surname)
