= Eddie McLeod =

Eddie McLeod may refer to:

- Eddie McLeod (cricketer) (1900–1989), New Zealand cricketer
- Eddie McLeod (footballer) (1907–1969), Scottish footballer
