= Calderwood (surname) =

Family name

Calderwood is a place-derived surname, of Brythonic and Old English origins in Lanarkshire Scotland.

== History ==
=== Etymology and origins ===
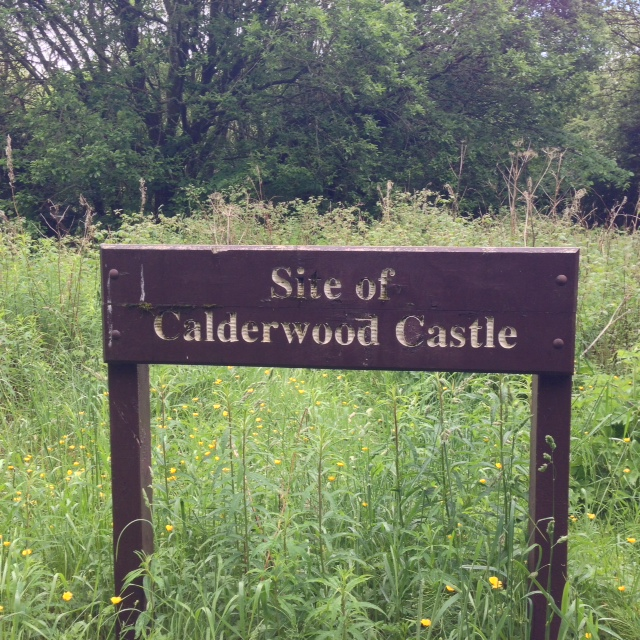
Calderwood Castle grounds

The derivation of Calder has been described as originating from the Old English (pre 800s) 'ceald', cold and 'wudu', a wood. However, as the earliest records of this surname relate to the ancient Barony of Calderwood in Lanarkshire Scotland (A County with several Calder Rivers named at an early period) then an early dialect of Welsh (Brythonic) gives the historically sound derivation of 'Cal Dur' for 'spiritual water' or 'sounding water in the woods'.

Calderwood Castle in the opinion of many genealogical groups is thought to have been anciently possessed by a family bearing the name Calderwood. In fact Calderwood is so ancient a title that it predates Castles in their modern interpretation. The documents regarding the ancient lands of Calderwood and family are scarce, but do suggest that the name descends from a small village or possibly a defended iron-age town (oppidum) as referred to in marriage charters. There were several Calderwood landholdings in the area, and the retainers on the lands would have gone by this name'.

=== Alleged loss of Calderwood Estate by the Calderwood family ===
Anecdotally in the work 'History of Rutherglen & East Kilbride, 1793, he describes an old story handed down by country folk bearing the name of Calderwood at that time in the Shire of Ayr.'In this work a tradition is given as to the estate of Calderwood having been possessed by a family of that surname from time immemorial. This family at last, consisted of 3 sons and a daughter. The sons having unhappily quarreled with the priest of the parish and finding it not safe to remain any longer in Calderwood, fled to the Earl of Cassilis for protection who gave them the farms of Peacockbank and Moss-side in the parish of Stewarton, and 40 acre lands in Kyle. The sister who was left in Kilbride, was married to a Maxwell, and got by the marriage, the whole of her fathers estate.' Since this anecdote does not appear to rely on any existing primary evidence, and as primary evidence itself negates the story by proving the estate of Calderwood came to the Maxwells via a marriage to the McGauckhin Family of Mearns Barony, it would appear it bears little truth. These take the form of early references in the British Library to such a marriage, although no document mentioning Calderwood and Mearns Barony are known. Surnames were assumed from places as well as professions, and within a strict historical context all that can be concluded at this time is that people descending 'of' Calderwood, either retainers or bonnet lairds within the lairdship, and perhaps many unrelated persons, adopted this surname at an early period. Sir Aymer de Maxwell (1200–1264), the Great Chamberlain of Scotland who gained several Sheriffdoms, was the father of Sir John Maxwell of Pollok, also known as Sir John Maxwell 'of Calderwood' (b. 1243) according to Fraser, but this appear to be purely the assumption of Fraser because no documents exist nor are cited by Fraser which styles the figure of Calderwood. The first known Maxwell castle in Calderwood was built after the year 1400 when the new cadet branch from Pollok was in need of protection as a family seat of the newly created 'Maxwells of Calderwood. This building may have occupied the site of an earlier defensive structure, as Calderwood is mentioned in the 1296 Ragman's Roll and the promontory is the only natural place in the gorge which lends itself to defence, although its visual prospect is greatly limited. Actually another site nearby has been identified as an early fortified site attached to a hillfort, but this is likelier the seat of the Calderwood family and not the Maxwells. The building known as Calderwood Castle (latterly Calderwood House) went through a series of changes over the centuries, with the most recent Gothic revival edifice being executed in the 1840s. The manor was sold circa 1904 to the Scottish Co-operative Wholesale Society, then a wing of the UK Government, private ownership, and finally the East Kilbride Development Corporation, who demolished the last traces of the Victorian building in 1951.

== Distribution ==
As a surname, Calderwood is the 77,052th most common name in the world with 5,744 bearers. Although originating in Lanarkshire, Scotland, it is found mostly in the United States, England, Scotland and Australia respectively. Other notable concentrations include South Africa, Canada, Northern Ireland and New Zealand. Currently, it ranks at 14,538 in the U.S.

Notable people with the surname include:

- Andrea Calderwood, British film and television producer
- Catherine Calderwood (born 1968), medical consultant from Northern Ireland, and former Chief Medical Officer for Scotland
- Chic Calderwood (1937–1966), Scottish light-heavyweight boxer
- Colin Calderwood, Scottish football player and manager
- David Calderwood, Scottish minister and historian
- Henry Calderwood (1830–1897), Scottish minister and philosopher
- Jimmy Calderwood (1955–2025), Scottish football player and manager
- Joanne Calderwood, Scottish Muay Thai fighter and mixed martial artist
- John Calderwood, Scottish American miner and labor union leader
- John Lindow Calderwood (1888–1960), English solicitor, British Army officer and later independent politician
- Mark Calderwood, English rugby league footballer
- Matt Calderwood, artist from Northern Ireland
- Nora Calderwood (1896–1985), Scottish professor
- Robert Calderwood (fl. 1885), Scottish football player
- Robert S. Calderwood, church Minister at Cambuslang, Scotland
- Sarah Calderwood, Australian singer-songwriter, flautist
- Scott Calderwood, British-Dutch football player
- Stewart Calderwood (1905–1973), Scottish football player
- Tyra Calderwood, Australian tennis player
