= Glasgow Metropolitan College =

Further education college in Glasgow, Scotland

- Type: College of Further Education
- Active: 2005–2010, merged into City of Glasgow College
- Affiliations: Glasgow City Centre Colleges
- Principal: Tom Wilson
- Administrative staff: 500
- Students: 20,000
- Location: Glasgow, Scotland
- Campus: Glasgow
- Website: http://www.glasgowmet.ac.uk/

Merged into the City of Glasgow College in 2010

Glasgow Metropolitan College was a further education college located in Glasgow, Scotland. The College was created on 7 February 2005 by the merger of the Glasgow College of Building & Printing and Glasgow College of Food Technology and itself merged with Central College and Glasgow College of Nautical Studies in 2010.

The College of Building and Printing itself was formed from the amalgamation of the College of Building and the College of Printing in 1972. The College of Building has had a presence on the College's current site since 1927.

The preceding colleges had a reputation for the provision of courses within the food, hospitality, tourism, construction and the creative industries. The merger and creation of Glasgow Metropolitan College created Glasgow’s biggest college with over 20,000 student enrolments and 500 members of staff.

== Campuses ==
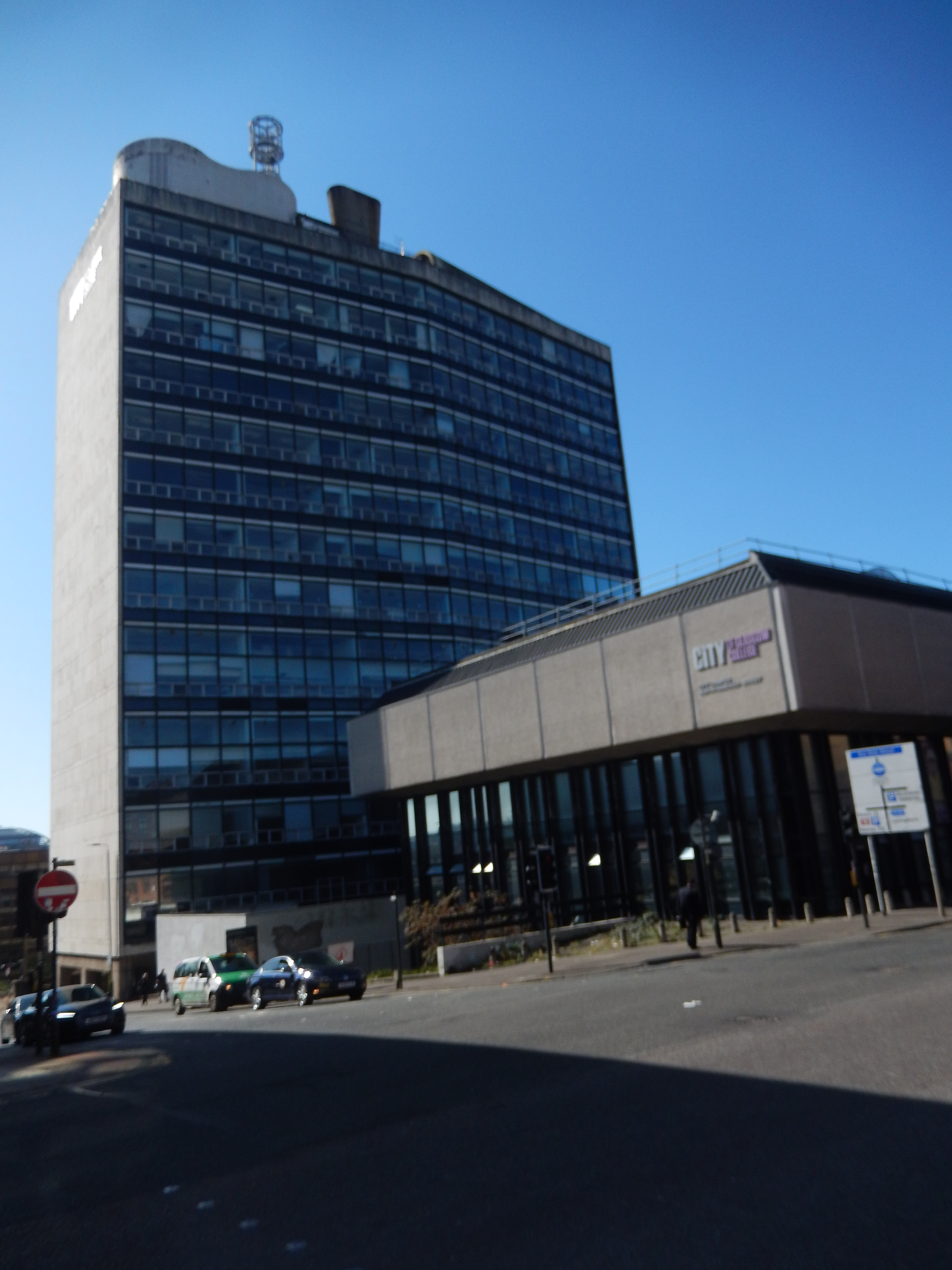
Former North Hanover Street Campus with the Met Tower featuring prominently

The College had five campuses within the city the largest being in the city centre at North Hanover Street. The Glasgow College of Building had a presence on this site since 1927 although its iconic high rise tower building (later known as the Met Tower) was constructed in 1961-64.

It was announced in 2008 that the College would participate in the creation of a 'super campus' to be built by 2012 and based in Glasgow city centre. This will be the largest college development project ever in the UK and will also be one of the largest in Europe.

The five campuses were all located within the City of Glasgow;

- North Hanover Street Campus, 60 North Hanover Street, Glasgow, G1 2BP (55.8626°N 4.2489°W)
- Cathedral Street Campus, 230 Cathedral Street, Glasgow, G1 2TG (55.8634°N 4.2463°W)
- Rogart Street Campus, 4 Rogart Street, Glasgow, G40 2AA (55.8512°N 4.2253°W)
- Dornoch Street Campus, Dornoch Street, Glasgow, G40 2QT (55.8515°N 4.2278°W)
- Florence Street Campus, 5 Florence Street, Glasgow, G5 0VX (55.8514°N 4.2466°W)

The Cathedral Street campus was chosen as the location for the replacement super campus, and the former Food Technology College and Allan Glen buildings were demolished for its construction. The former College of Building and Printing (Met Tower) and the College of Commerce buildings were protected as Grade B listed structures.

The Met Tower lay unused for several years and was dubbed "the ugliest building in the UK", in part due to its prominent location overlooking George Square being utilised to display a giant pink "People Make Glasgow". It was purchased by a commercial development company (Bruntwood), and as of 2023, and was initially intended to be converted as an office block for new technology start-ups. However, in May 2024 the plans were scrapped and the building was put back up for sale. It was acquired in August 2025 by Vita Group for an undisclosed sum, with the intention of converting it for residential use.

== Schools ==
The College had four schools:

- School of Built Environment
- School of Communication and Media
- School of Design
- School of Food, Hospitality, Sport and Tourism

== Notable former students ==
- Martin Docherty-Hughes, Member of Parliament.
