= Craig Boardman =

English footballer

Personal information
- Full name: Craig George Boardman
- Date of birth: 30 November 1970 (age 55)
- Place of birth: Barnsley, England
- Position: Central defender

Youth career
- 1989–1991: Nottingham Forest

Senior career*
Years	Team	Apps	(Gls)
1991–1993	Nottingham Forest	0	(0)
1993	Peterborough United	0	(0)
1993–1995	Halifax Town	61	(0)
1995–1996	Scarborough	9	(0)
1996–1998	Stalybridge Celtic	42	(0)
1998	Halifax Town	5	(0)
1998–1999	Sheffield		
1999–2000	Ossett Town		
2000–2001	Stocksbridge Park Steels		
Total		117+	(0+)
- * Club domestic league appearances and goals

Craig George Boardman (born 30 November 1970) is an English former professional footballer who played as a central defender.

== Career ==
Born in Barnsley, Boardman began his career with Nottingham Forest, making one appearance in the League Cup in September 1991. After a brief spell with Peterborough United, in which he made just one Cup appearance, Boardman signed for non-League side Halifax Town, before returning to the Football League with Scarborough during the 1995–96 season. Boardman later played non-League football with a number of teams including Stalybridge Celtic, Halifax Town, Sheffield, Ossett Town and Stocksbridge Park Steels.

== Personal life ==
His grandfather and father (both named George) were also professional footballers. His son Charlie played for the Barnsley Academy, becoming the fourth generation of the family to become a footballer.
