= Eddie McLeod (footballer) =

Scottish footballer

Personal information
- Full name: Edward McCormack McLeod
- Date of birth: 28 July 1907
- Place of birth: Springburn, Scotland
- Date of death: 1969
- Place of death: Troy, NY, United States
- Height: 5 ft 7 in (1.70 m)
- Position: Left half

Senior career*
Years	Team	Apps	(Gls)
–	Ashfield		
1926–1944	Partick Thistle	394	(6)

International career
1930–1931	Scottish League XI	2	(0)
- * Club domestic league appearances and goals

Edward McCormick McLeod (born 28 July 1907 – 1969) was a Scottish footballer who played as a left half; his only club at the professional level was Partick Thistle, where he spent thirteen 'normal' seasons (all in the top division), and was also on the books during the unofficial World War II campaigns, making 495 appearances for the Jags in all competitions and scoring 7 goals. He played for the club in the 1930 Scottish Cup Final which they lost to Rangers after a replay, but did manage to claim winner's medals in the Glasgow Merchants Charity Cup in 1927 and the one-off Glasgow Dental Hospital Cup in 1928, both against the same opponents, followed later by a Glasgow Cup in 1934.

McLeod was selected twice for the Scottish Football League XI, both times against the Irish League XI, and played in one edition of the Glasgow Football Association's annual challenge match against Sheffield.
