= Melville Dundas =

Scottish construction company

- Industry: Construction
- Founded: 1908
- Defunct: 2003
- Fate: administration
- Headquarters: Glasgow
- Key people: Alexander Dundas (Chairman 1908-1937); Kenneth Dundas (Chairman 1937-1950)

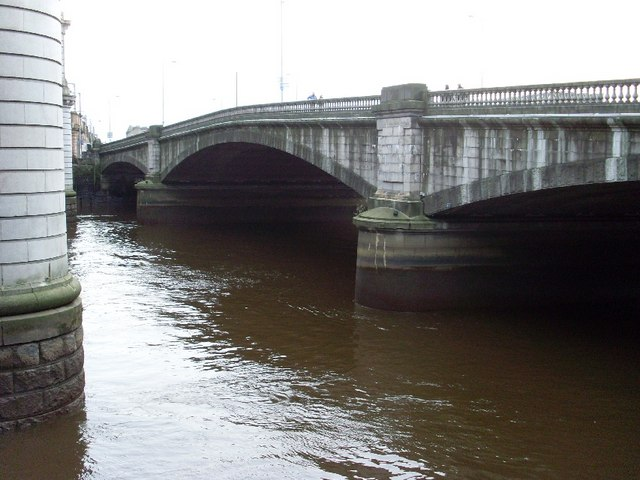
King George V Bridge

Melville Dundas was a major Scottish construction company.

== History ==
The business was established by Alexander Dundas in 1908; it was incorporated as Melville Dundas & Whitson during 1932. Kenneth Dundas took over as chairman of the business in 1937. During the Second World War the company was one of the contractors engaged in building the Mulberry harbour units.

During 1981, the company was acquired by F J C Lilley plc, which traded as Lilley plc from April 1989. until it went into receivership during January 1993. Melville Dundas was bought out of receivership by its management team. The revived company was able to achieve profitable operations early on. In June 1999, the company recorded a pre-tax profit in excess of £1 million, a 24 per cent increase over the previous year.

Record growth was achieved during 2000 although profitability decreased, which was attributed to protracted contractual negotiations. As early as 2001, Melville Dundas had encountered financial hardship due to difficulties encountered in collecting due payments for jobs which were disputed. During 2002, in response to declining turnover, the firm opted to focus on smaller and less risky jobs. In July 2002, following a sharp drop in profits that placed the firm in breach of a covenant to its lenders, Melville Dundas was compelled to renegotiate the terms of its bank borrowings.

During May 2003, Melville Dundas went into administration. The auditing firm Ernst & Young was brought in to administrate the process; Carillion was amongst the several parties interested in acquiring assets that formerly comprised the company. Ernst & Young partially attributed the collapse to the firm's management having overstated the value of multiple contracts. In August 2003, a group of the company's creditors publicly called for an investigation into the collapse to be conducted by the Department of Trade and Industry. Legal ramifications pertaining to employer payments, in spite of the firm's collapse, were still ongoing in late 2007.

== Projects ==
Major projects undertaken by the company included the George V Bridge, Glasgow completed in 1928, the Glasgow College of Building and Printing completed in 1964, the extension to the Glasgow Dental Hospital and School completed in 1970, University Hospital Crosshouse completed in 1978, and the conversion of Queen's Hall, Edinburgh completed in 1979.
