= Central College (Glasgow) =

College in Glasgow, Scotland

Coordinates: 55.86366°N 4.24368°W

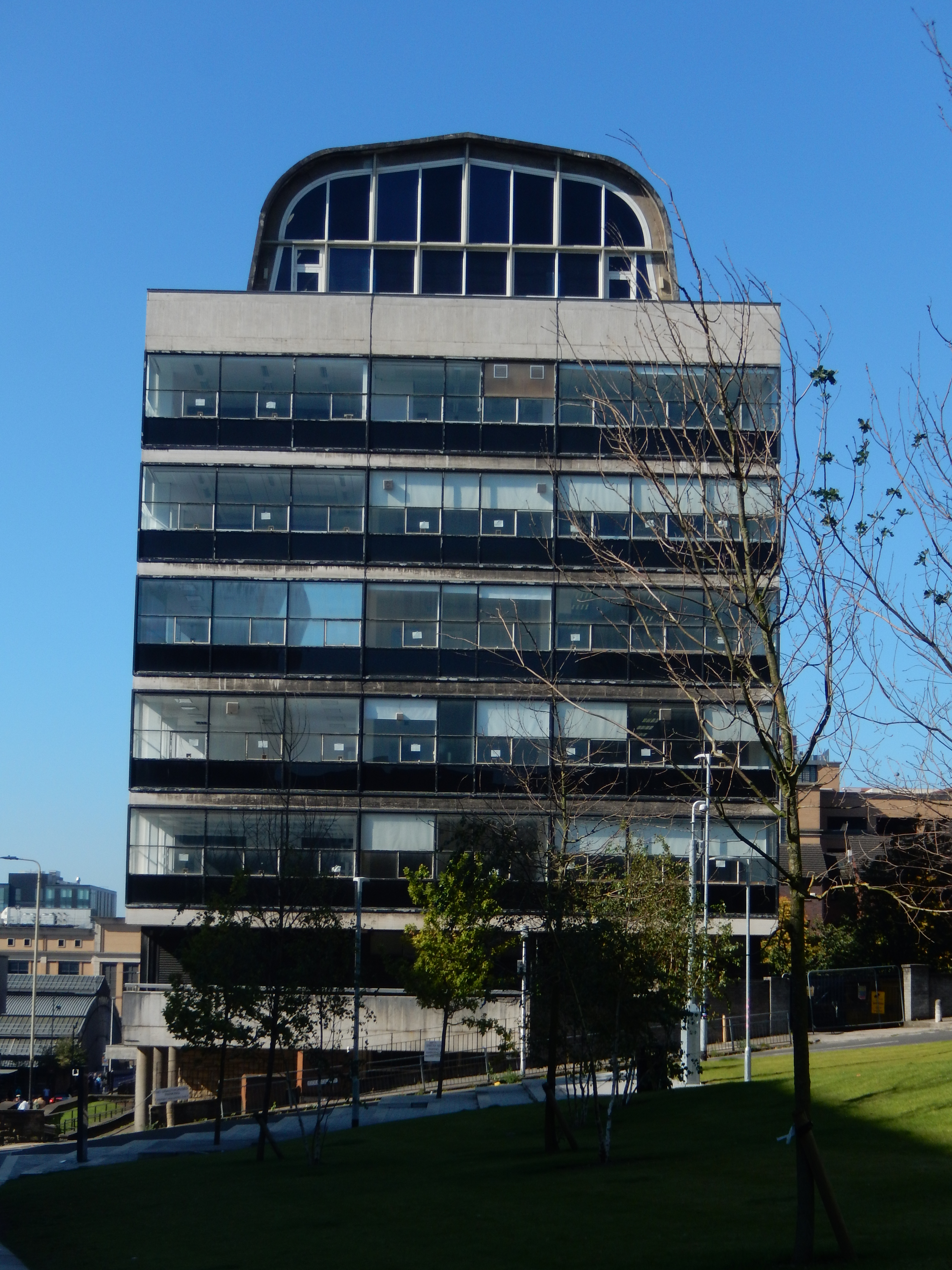
- The former Central College of Commerce main building at 300 Cathedral Street. It currently holds Grade B listed status
- Type: Further and Higher Education
- Active: 1963–2010
- Principal: Paul Little (at closure)
- Students: 8300 (at closure)
- Location: Glasgow, Scotland

Central College, formerly Central College of Commerce, was a college situated in the centre of Glasgow. It merged with Glasgow Metropolitan College and Glasgow College of Nautical Studies in 2010 to form City of Glasgow College. The college had links to universities such as Glasgow Caledonian University and the University of Glasgow and provided courses such as Business Studies, Information Technology and Health, Hair and Beauty, Legal Studies (which can provide a direct access to the LLB law degree) and accountancy.

The college was one of Scotland's few specialist colleges and provided courses from Certificate through to Postgraduate level.

In addition to the first two years of full-time degree programmes, the college offered training courses and business services to companies in the private and public sectors – locally, nationally and internationally. The college offered a large number of full time vocational 12-month courses targeted at young people who had successfully completed secondary school education.

The college achieved the quality standard "Scottish Quality Management System" (SQMS) and had numerous other training and quality awards.

Most of the students at the college progressed to the local Universities of Glasgow, Strathclyde, Glasgow Caledonian and West of Scotland. Distributive Studies Students in the 1970s and 1980s completed a one-year vocational course and were awarded the Scottish National Certificates in Distribution Studies (Group Certificate) – this group certificate was issued by SCOTBEC (the Scottish Business Education Council) listing all individual subject (each of which had an SNC certificate separately) in the form of a single qualification – The SNC in Distributive Studies covering Distributive Law, Distributive Accountancy, Behavioural Science for Distribution, Distributive Studies and Communication Studies. The College also issued its own Certificate in Marketing aimed to be equivalent to that issued by the Institute of Marketing.

The college had over 500 staff. The principal since October 2007 was Paul Little.

== History ==
The college was founded in 1963 and its first chairman was Charles Oakley, who was heavily involved in the regeneration of Glasgow after World War II. The college had about 2300 full-time students and 6000 part-time students at the time of its closure.

Central College merged with two other city centre colleges – Metropolitan, and Nautical – to form a "super college" that is the biggest in Scotland and one of the largest in the UK. The Central College Board and staff had originally opposed the plan, but after much negotiation among the three Colleges, the merger was agreed. A proposed £300M "super campus" will be built on Cathedral Street and Thistle Street following the establishment of a new company, New Campus Glasgow, to procure it.

The former Allan Glen's School buildings were demolished in mid-2013 and the new campus was completed in 2016.

== Campus ==
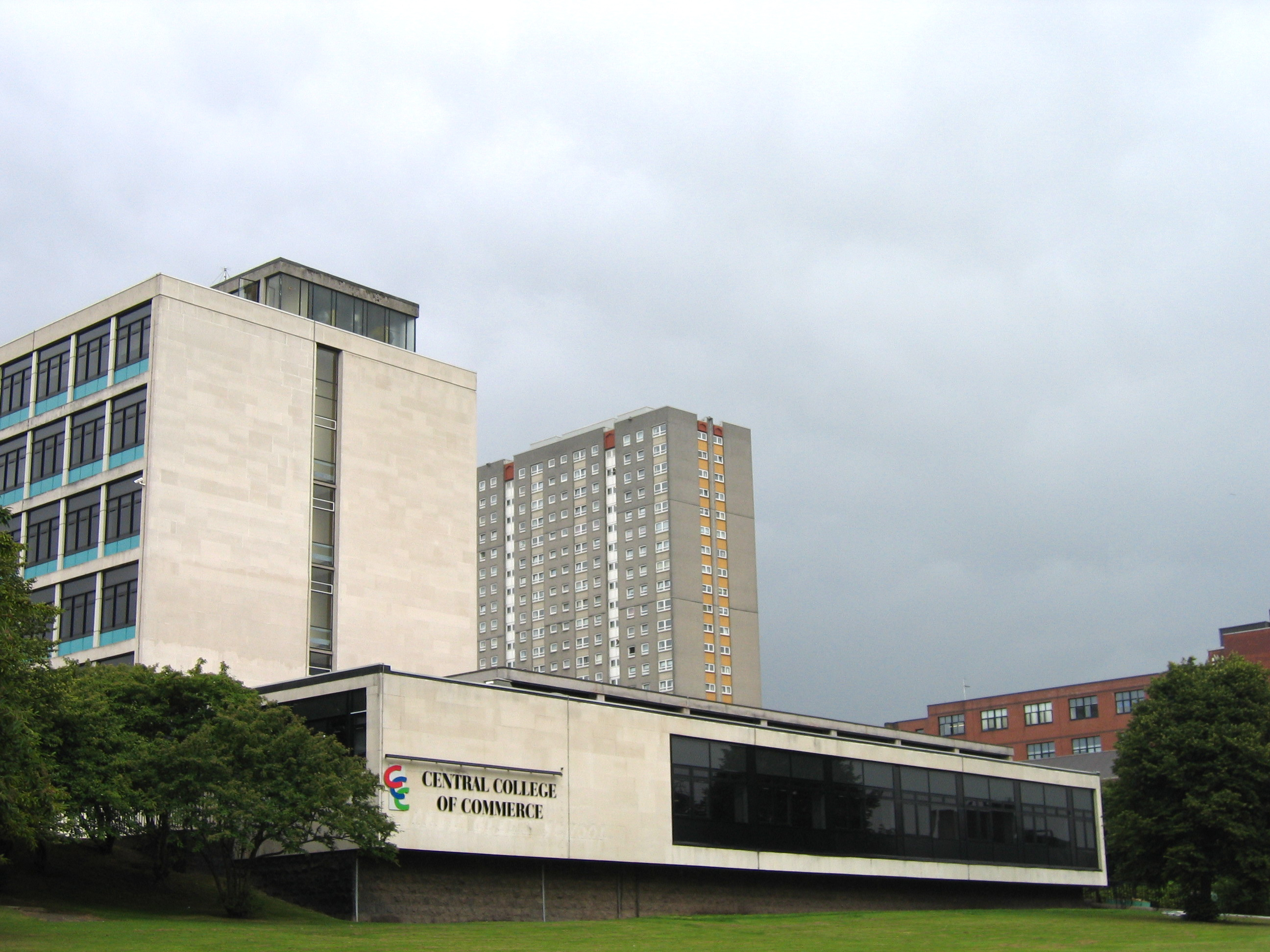
The former Allan Glen's School, built in 1962 which became a main building of the college. It was demolished in 2013 to make way for the new City of Glasgow College 'supercampus'

The college was situated at 300 Cathedral Street, Glasgow, near to George Square and stands diagonally opposite its 'sister' building – the former College of Building and Printing (Met Tower). This original 7-storey building housed health and beauty classes and was renamed as the Charles Oakley Building after the college's founder in later years. Designed by Peter Williams of Wyllie Shanks and Underwood, and completed in 1963. It was selected for Grade B listing along with the Met Tower in 2012 as "An important example of post-war tertiary educational architecture". Like its sister building (also designed by Williams) its aesthetic was strongly influenced by Le Corbusier's famous La Cité Radieuse block in Marseille with the distinctive "upturned boat" roof penthouse which housed a gymnasium.

The Allan Glen building hosted business, legal, accounting and ICT subjects. The newest building, the Central Business Learning Zone (CBLZ), housed the college's information services along with examination and training facilities.

== Courses ==
The college ran courses leading to qualifications including The Certificate in Marketing, National Certificates (SNC), Scottish Vocational Qualifications (SVQ), Higher National Certificates (HNC), Higher National Diplomas (HND) and Diplomas in HE through three departments

- Accounting, Law and Information Technology (Allan Glen's Building)
- Health, Hair and Beauty (Charles Oakley Campus)
- Marketing, Business Management and Design (Charles Oakley Campus)

The college also ran special courses for asylum-seekers, including English for Speakers of other Languages (ESOL 1–4).
