= Alex Elliott (footballer, born 1905) =

Scottish footballer

Personal information
- Full name: Alexander Cooper Elliott
- Date of birth: 10 January 1905
- Place of birth: Maryhill, Scotland
- Date of death: 1988 (aged 82–83)
- Place of death: Glasgow, Scotland
- Position: Right half

Senior career*
Years	Team	Apps	(Gls)
–	Glasgow Perthshire		
1927–1944	Partick Thistle	369	(16)

International career
1938	Scottish League XI	1	(0)
- * Club domestic league appearances and goals

Alexander Cooper Elliott (10 January 1905 – 1988) was a Scottish footballer who played as a right half; his only club at the professional level was Partick Thistle, where he spent twelve 'normal' seasons (all in the top division), and was also on the books during the unofficial World War II seasons, making 454 appearances for the Jags in all competitions and scoring 17 goals. He played for the club in the 1930 Scottish Cup Final which they lost to Rangers after a replay, but did manage to claim winner's medals in the Glasgow Cup and Glasgow Merchants Charity Cup, both in the 1934–35 season.

Elliott was selected once for the Scottish Football League XI against the Irish League XI in 1938, and played in two editions of the Glasgow Football Association's annual challenge match against Sheffield.
