= George Boardman (footballer, born 1904) =

Scottish footballer (1904–1969)

Personal information
- Date of birth: 20 October 1904
- Place of birth: Dennistoun, Scotland
- Date of death: 1969 (aged 64–65)
- Place of death: Glasgow, Scotland
- Position: Inside forward

Senior career*
Years	Team	Apps	(Gls)
- Parkhead
1927–1933	Partick Thistle	93	(22)
1927	→ Ashfield (loan)		
1933–1935	Bradford (Park Avenue)		
1935–1936	Nairn County	19	(7)
- * Club domestic league appearances and goals

George Boardman (20 October 1904 – 1969) was a Scottish professional footballer who played for Partick Thistle, Bradford (Park Avenue) and Nairn County, mainly as an inside forward although he also featured at centre half and centre forward.

He played for Partick in the 1930 Scottish Cup Final which they lost to Rangers after a replay, but did manage to claim winner's medals with the Jags in the Glasgow Merchants Charity Cup in 1927 and the one-off Glasgow Dental Hospital Cup in 1928, both against the same opponents.

== Personal life ==
His son George and grandson Craig were also footballers.
