= John Blair (footballer, born 1897) =

Scottish footballer

Personal information
- Date of birth: 27 June 1897
- Place of birth: Saltcoats, Scotland
- Date of death: 4 February 1971 (aged 72)
- Place of death: Saltcoats, Scotland
- Height: 5 ft 9 in (1.75 m)
- Position: Outside right

Senior career*
Years	Team	Apps	(Gls)
–	Saltcoats Victoria		
1920–1925	Partick Thistle	140	(31)
–	Saltcoats Victoria		
- * Club domestic league appearances and goals

John Blair (27 June 1897 – 4 February 1971) was a Scottish footballer who played as an outside right, mainly for Partick Thistle where he spent six seasons, making 173 appearances for the Jags in all competitions and scoring 33 goals. Blair scored the only goal of the 1921 Scottish Cup Final when Partick defeated Rangers to claim the trophy for the only time in their history.

Having gradually lost his regular place to David Ness who joined the club in 1923, two years later Blair left Thistle and made the unusual step of returning to his hometown team Saltcoats Victoria in the junior leagues, normally populated by promising teenagers (indeed Blair had also started his career at the same club), those who never reached professional status or veterans approaching retirement, rather than a player in his mid-20s with a proven reputation at a high level. It is likely the move was linked to a desire to remain close to home to support the plumbing business he had established, and with no senior clubs in northern Ayrshire he willingly moved back down the grades. It is known that his play was still of a high enough standard to be selected for Scotland at Junior international level on four occasions.
