= Glasgow Dental Hospital and School =

- NHS Greater Glasgow and Clyde
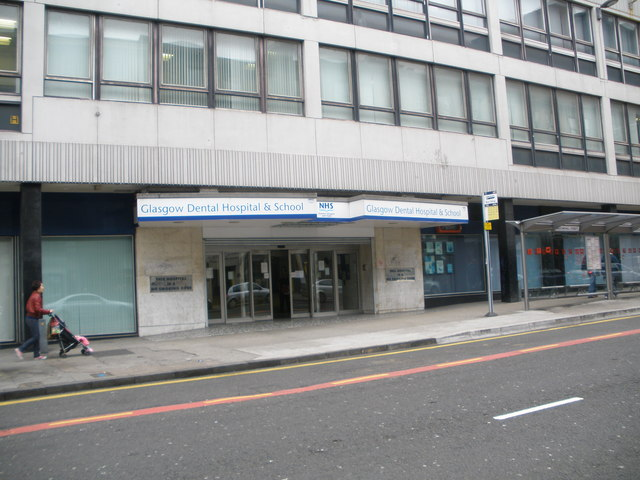
- Glasgow Dental Hospital and School, Sauchiehall Street

- Shown in Glasgow

Geography
- Location: Glasgow, Scotland
- Coordinates: 55.8663°N 4.2661°W

Organisation
- Care system: NHS Scotland
- Affiliated university: University of Glasgow

History
- Founded: 1879

Links
- Website: Glasgow Dental Hospital and School
- Lists: Hospitals in Scotland

The Glasgow Dental Hospital and School is a dental teaching hospital, situated in the Garnethill area of the city centre of Glasgow, Scotland.

== History ==
The Glasgow Dental School was formed as part of Anderson's College in 1879. It moved to Dalhousie Street in 1903.

The current hospital is a category B listed Art Deco building with its entrance on Renfrew Street, which was designed by Wylie, Wright and Wylie and completed in 1931; in 1928 a football tournament was held between the local teams explicitly to raise funds for its construction, won by Partick Thistle and providing £819 (equivalent to around £50,000 90 years later). The Dental School began issuing the Bachelor of Dental Surgery Degree of the University of Glasgow in 1948.

A large extension fronting Sauchiehall Street was completed in the brutalist style by Melville Dundas & Whitson in 1970. The Glasgow Dental Education Centre, which is located adjacent to the Dental School, provides post-graduate and distance dental education.
