= Jimmy Kinloch =

Scottish footballer

Personal information
- Date of birth: 14 April 1898
- Place of birth: Glasgow, Scotland
- Date of death: 21 October 1962 (aged 64)
- Place of death: Bearsden, Scotland
- Height: 5 ft 8 in (1.73 m)
- Position: Inside right

Senior career*
Years	Team	Apps	(Gls)
1918–1920	Queen's Park	60	(19)
1920–1928	Partick Thistle	194	(57)
Total		254	(76)

International career
1922	Scotland	1	(0)
- * Club domestic league appearances and goals

James Kinloch (14 April 1898 - 21 October 1962) was a Scottish footballer who played as an inside right.

== Career ==
Born in Glasgow, Kinloch played club football for Queen's Park and Partick Thistle, and made one appearance for Scotland in 1922. He won the Scottish Cup in 1921 with Partick Thistle, and later served as chairman of the club. He is a member of the club's Hall of Fame.
