= Alex McSpadyen =

Scottish footballer

Personal information
- Full name: Alexander McCluckie McSpadyen
- Date of birth: 19 December 1914
- Place of birth: Holytown, Scotland
- Date of death: 1978 (aged 63–64)
- Place of death: Bellshill, Scotland
- Position: Outside right

Youth career
- 1933: Chapelhall Juveniles
- 1934: Newarthill Hearts
- 1934–1935: Holytown United

Senior career*
Years	Team	Apps	(Gls)
1935–1948	Partick Thistle	123	(12)
1948–1949	Portadown		

International career
1938–1941	Scottish League XI	3	(1)
1938–1939	Scotland	2	(0)
1940	Scotland (wartime)	1	(0)
- * Club domestic league appearances and goals

Alexander McCluckie McSpadyen (19 December 1914 – 1978) was a Scottish footballer who played as an outside right, mainly for Partick Thistle as well as for Aberdeen as a guest player during World War II and Portadown after the conflict ended.

Having been brought in to the Partick squad as an inexperienced teenager to potentially replace the long-serving Davie Ness, McSpadyen won the Glasgow Merchants Charity Cup at the end of his first season with the Jags quickly became a first-team regular and gained international recognition before his career progress was halted by the outbreak of war, which occurred when he was aged 24 and appeared to be coming to the peak of his abilities. He joined the Army and appeared for their select team in charity matches, while also finding time to play for Partick Thistle in wartime competitions when possible. This brought his total number of appearances for the club to 297 with 33 goals, although his official SFL and Scottish Cup totals were less than half of that (130/13). After playing for Portadown, he returned to Holytown United as a trainer until the club folded a year later.

McSpadyen represented Scotland twice, also playing in one unofficial wartime match, and making three appearances for the Scottish Football League XI, all between 1938 and 1941.
