= Stewart Calderwood =

Scottish footballer

Personal information
- Date of birth: 3 December 1905
- Place of birth: Linwood, Scotland
- Date of death: 1973 (aged 67–68)
- Place of death: Cambuslang, Scotland
- Position: Full back

Senior career*
Years	Team	Apps	(Gls)
–	Rutherglen Glencairn		
1926–1939	Partick Thistle	344	(9)
- * Club domestic league appearances and goals

Stewart Calderwood (3 December 1905 – 1973) was a Scottish footballer who played as a full back (either right or left side); his only club at the professional level was Partick Thistle, where he spent twelve seasons (all in the top division), making 420 appearances for the Jags in all competitions and scoring 9 goals. He was on the books for a thirteenth year without playing before signing provisionally with Queens Park Rangers in England on a free transfer, aged 33; however, the outbreak of World War II meant he never made a competitive appearance for the West London club. He served in the Royal Air Force during the conflict.

Calderwood played in the 1930 Scottish Cup Final which Partick Thistle lost to Rangers after a replay, but did manage to claim winner's medals in the Glasgow Merchants Charity Cup in 1927 and 1935, and the Glasgow Cup in 1934. It is also recorded that he received a medal from the one-off Glasgow Dental Hospital Cup in 1928 (this was sold at auction in 2011); he did not take part in the final itself but did play in the semi-final. He was selected for one edition of the Glasgow Football Association's annual challenge match against Sheffield but received no further representative honours.
