= 1929–30 Scottish Cup =

Tournament details
- Country: Scotland

Final positions
- Champions: Rangers
- Runners-up: Partick Thistle

The 1929–30 Scottish Cup was the 52nd staging of Scotland's most prestigious football knockout competition. The Cup was won by Rangers who defeated Partick Thistle in the replayed final.

== Fourth round ==
Team One	Team Two	Score
Rangers	Montrose	3–0
Dundee	Hearts	2–2 / 0–4 (R)
St Mirren	Hamilton Academicals	3–4
Partick Thistle	Falkirk	3–1

== Semi-finals ==
22 March 1930

Partick Thistle	3–1	Hamilton Academical

Attendance: 37,500

22 March 1930

Rangers	4–1	Hearts
Jimmy Fleming (3); Bob McPhail

Hampden Park, Glasgow
Attendance: 92,084

== Final ==
12 April 1930

Rangers	0–0	Partick Thistle

Hampden Park, Glasgow
Attendance: 107,475

=== Replay ===
16 April 1930

Rangers	2–1	Partick Thistle
Marshall; Craig		Torbet

Hampden Park, Glasgow
Attendance: 103,688

=== Teams ===
Rangers:
GK	Tom Hamilton
RB	Dougie Gray
LB	Bob Hamilton
RH	Jock Buchanan
CH	Davie Meiklejohn
LH	Tully Craig
OR	Sandy Archibald
IR	James Marshall
CF	Jimmy Fleming
IL	Bob McPhail
OL	Willie Nicholson
Replay:	Whitey McDonald and Alan Morton replaced Buchanan and Nicholson

Partick Thistle:
GK	John Jackson
RB	Stewart Calderwood
LB	Jimmy Rae
RH	Alec Elliott
CH	Alex Lambie
LH	Eddie McLeod
OR	Davie Ness
IR	Bobby Grove
CF	George Boardman
IL	Johnny Ballantyne
OL	John Torbet
Replay:	Unchanged

== See also ==
- 1921 Scottish Cup Final (between same teams)
- 1929–30 in Scottish football
