= Unité d'Habitation of Briey =

Housing unit in Briey

Coordinates: 49.2602°N 5.9281°E

Outside of the Unité d'Habitation of Briey

The Unité d'Habitation of Briey (also Cité radieuse de Briey-en-Forêt) is a housing unit built between 1959 and 1960 in Briey (Meurthe-et-Moselle) by the Franco-Swiss architect Le Corbusier according to the Unité d'habitation design principle established for Marseille. It was originally built for the HLM departmental office but was eventually abandoned by the landlord and threatened with destruction in the 1980s. It has since been gradually rehabilitated.

== Project and building description ==
The housing unit was built as part of a larger development project in the Lorraine mining basin. Georges-Henri Pingusson was the chief architect for this neighborhood, which included two sets of 100 housing units and a school. The development of iron mines and steel production in the region led to rapid population growth. The objective of the project was to build housing adequate for the needs of the growing population.

In 1955, Le Corbusier met with officials in Briey, after which he was appointed chief architect of this project. André Wogenscky was appointed managing architect. The HLM office was the contracting authority.

The proposed building was 110 meters long and 56 meters high (70 meters at its highest point) by 19 meters wide. The structure encompassed 339 duplex apartments spread over 17 floors with six internal streets. The structure was modeled on the Radiant City of Rezé, with only minor alterations made. For instance, the size of the units was smaller due to HLM regulations; there was no equipment on the roof;, and there were no commercial sections along the streets. Construction began on March 3, 1959, and ended two years later.

== Abandonment and rehabilitation of the unit ==
The first tenants arrived in 1961, but problems soon developed. Structural defects and poor maintenance plagued the building. Economic conditions in the region worsened. The Briey mines eventually closed, and some of the tenants began to experience financial difficulties. In 1983, the last tenants were moved out of the structure which, afterwards, remained largely abandoned.

In 1984, it was proposed that the structure be demolished, but the new mayor of Briey, Guy Vattier, opposed the plan. A committee was established with the purpose of saving the structure. In the meantime, the town hospital purchased part of the building to accommodate a nursing school. In 1989 an association called "The First Street" occupied another part of the structure. It organized cultural events focusing on the visual arts and architecture. In 1991, the remaining apartments were sold to private buyers. Since 1994, the structure has served as the site of a local architectural book festival called “Architectural impressions”.

On November 26, 1993, parts of the structure were registered as historical monuments. These included the facades, roofs and portico, the hall with its counter, and the first street, as well as apartments 101, 116, 128, 131, 132, 133 and 134. As of July 16, 2007, the facades and roofs of the old boiler room, along with its portico also were registered as historical monuments. The entire set is classified now as "20th century Heritage".

In 2010, following three years of construction under the direction of architects Medrea and Ferauge, the facades were restored and the housing units were repainted in the original colors.

== Bibliography ==
- Jacques Sbriglio, Le Corbusier: the Unit of Marseille and the other housing units in Rezé-les-Nantes, Berlin, Briey en Forêt and Firminy, France, Birkhäuser, 2004, pocket ( ISBN 978-3-7643-6718-3, LCCN 2004051709 ), p. 210–218.
- Joseph Abram (with an interview with Guy Vattier), Le Corbusier in Briey. Eventful History of a Housing Unit, Paris, Jean-Michel Place, coll. "Architecture / archives", 2006, 76 p. ( ISBN 978-2-85893-878-0, LCCN 2007370441).
- Gérard Monnier, Le Corbusier. Housing units in France, Belin, coll. "The destinies of heritage", 2002, 240 p. (ISBN 978-2-7011-2577-0).
