= 1920–21 Scottish Cup =

Tournament details
- Country: Scotland
- Teams: 44

Final positions
- Champions: Partick Thistle
- Runners-up: Rangers

Tournament statistics
- Matches played: 69
- Goals scored: 161 (2.33 per match)

The 1920–21 Scottish Cup was the 43rd staging of Scotland's most prestigious football knockout competition. The Cup was won for the first time in their history by Partick Thistle who defeated Rangers in the final. Thistle played 11 matches in their cup run. The defending champions Kilmarnock were defeated in the second round by Aberdeen.

== Second round ==
Partick Thistle had two goalless draws with Hibernian - the first at Easter Road and the second at Firhill in front of 25,000 fans, before a single goal from MacFarlane, who played no part in the final, saw off the Hibs in the 2nd replay. The second replay on Tuesday 21 February 1921 at Parkhead, Glasgow had an attendance of over 20,000 on a wet and stormy day. MacFarlane's second half goal was a header scored from a free-kick. Shortly afterwards the centre forward had a penalty saved by Hibs goalie Harper.

== Third round ==
Partick Thistle beat East Stirlingshire 2–0 with Jimmy Kinloch scoring both goals.

== Fourth round ==
Team One	Team Two	Score
Dundee	Albion Rovers	0-2
Celtic	Hearts	1-2
Partick Thistle	Motherwell	0-0 2-2 2-1
Dumbarton	Rangers	0-3

== Semi-finals ==
26 March 1921

Partick Thistle	0–0	Hearts

Ibrox, Glasgow
Attendance: 63,700

26 March 1921

Rangers	4–1	Albion Rovers
Tommy Cairns (2); Andy Cunningham; Sandy Archibald

Celtic Park, Glasgow
Attendance: 65,000

=== Replays ===
30 March 1921

Partick Thistle	0–0	Hearts

Ibrox, Glasgow
Attendance: 21,000

==== Second replays ====
5 April 1921

Partick Thistle	2–0	Hearts
Jimmy Kinloch (2)

Ibrox, Glasgow
Attendance: 40,000

== Final ==
The match was dubbed the 'Boycott Final' after the Scottish Football Association raised the admission price from one shilling to two shillings. It was also played in the midst of a miners' strike.

16 April 1921

Partick Thistle	1–0	Rangers
John Blair

Celtic Park, Glasgow
Attendance: 28,294

=== Teams ===
Partick Thistle:
GK	Kenny Campbell
RB	Tom Crichton
LB	Willie Bulloch
RH	Joe Harris
CH	Matt Wilson
LH	Walter Borthwick
OR	John Blair
IR	Jimmy Kinloch
CF	Davie Johnstone
IL	Jimmy McMenemy
OL	Willie Salisbury
Manager:
George Easton

Rangers:
GK	Willie Robb
RB	Bert Manderson
LB	Billy McCandless
RH	Davie Meiklejohn
CH	Arthur Dixon
LH	James Bowie
OR	Sandy Archibald
IR	Andy Cunningham
CF	Geordie Henderson
IL	Tommy Cairns
OL	Alan Morton
Manager:
Bill Struth

== See also ==
- 1920–21 in Scottish football
- 1930 Scottish Cup Final (between same teams)
