= James Marshall (footballer, born 1908) =

Scottish footballer

Personal information
- Date of birth: 3 January 1908
- Place of birth: Avonbridge, Stirlingshire, Scotland
- Date of death: 27 December 1977 (aged 69)
- Height: 5 ft 9 in (1.75 m)
- Position: Inside forward

Senior career*
Years	Team	Apps	(Gls)
- Shettleston
1925–1934	Rangers	200	(111)
1934–1935	Arsenal	4	(0)
1935–1937	West Ham United	59	(14)
Total		263	(125)

International career
1932–1934	Scotland	3	(0)
1932	Scottish League XI	1	(0)
- * Club domestic league appearances and goals

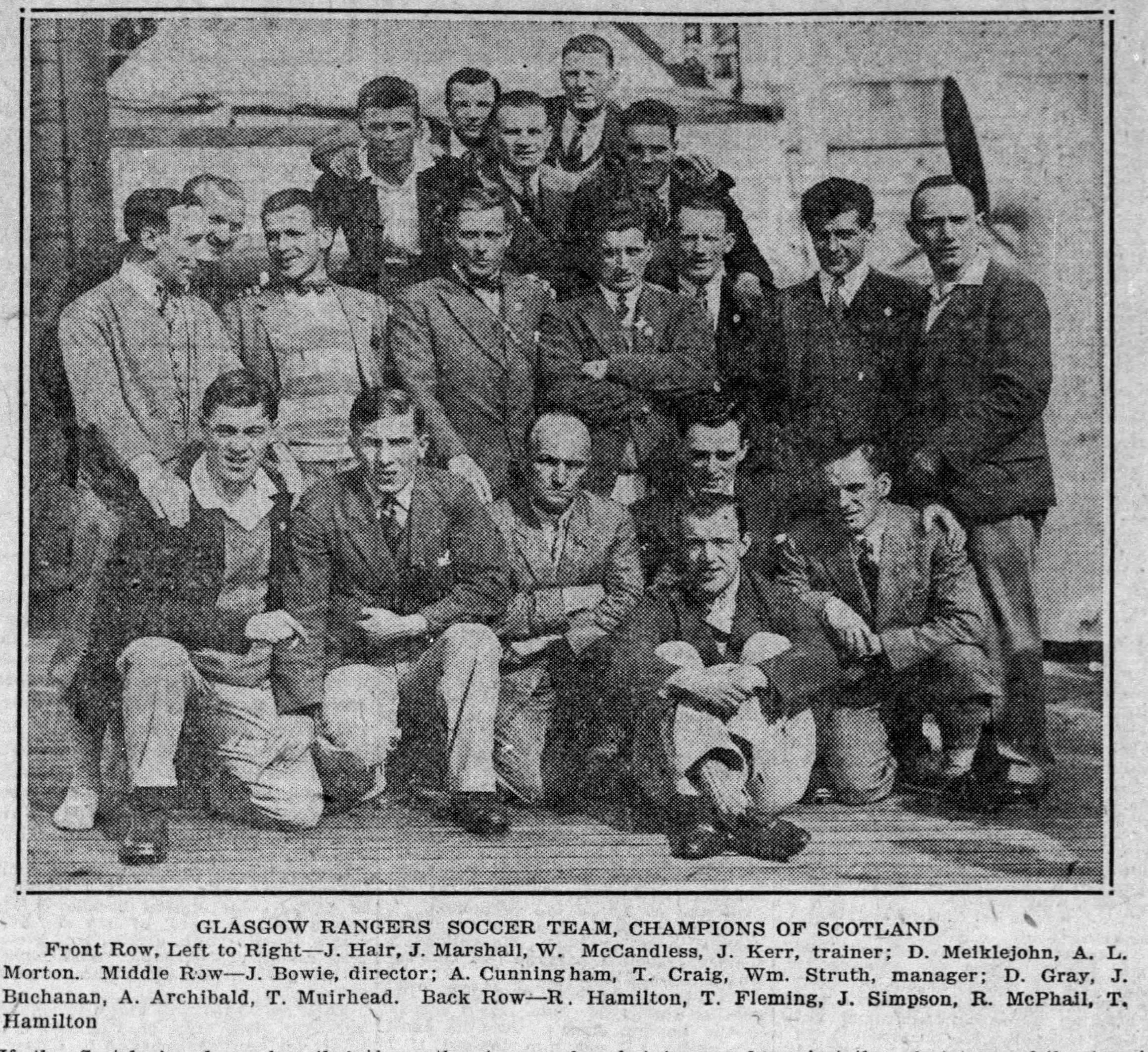
James Marshall (pictured front row, second from left), in a 1928 photo commemorating a championship win for the Glasgow Rangers

James Marshall (3 January 1908 – 27 December 1977) was a Scottish footballer who played for Rangers, Arsenal, and the Scotland national side. He played as an inside forward.

== Career ==
=== Club ===
Marshall was born in Avonbridge, Stirlingshire and joined Rangers from Shettleston in 1925. During his nine-year spell at Ibrox, he amassed five League championships and three Scottish Cups. In total, he scored 137 goals in 243 appearances for Rangers in all competitions.

Marshall was a qualified doctor, gaining his medical degree in October 1933, and it was a medical appointment in London that caused him to leave Rangers and join Arsenal in July 1934. Marshall made his debut for the club on 17 September 1934 against Blackburn Rovers in a 2–0 defeat. He also scored in Arsenal's 4–0 defeat of Manchester City in that season's Charity Shield, but with Alex James, Ray Bowden and Bobby Davidson keeping him out of the side, he only made four league appearances for Arsenal.

He left Arsenal in March 1935, to move to West Ham United for £5,000. Marshall spent two seasons there, where he scored 13 goals in 59 appearances. He eventually retired at the early age of 29. Marshall continued to practice medicine in London within the Bermondsey area. He died in 1977 at the age of sixty-nine.

=== International ===
Marshall won three Scotland caps, all of them against England between 1932 and 1934, and all while playing for Rangers.

== Honours ==
Rangers

- Scottish League Championship: 1926–27, 1928–29, 1929–30, 1930–31, 1932–33, 1933–34
- Scottish FA Cup: 1929–30, 1931–32, 1933–34

Arsenal

- FA Charity Shield: 1934
