= George Boardman (footballer, born 1943) =

Scottish footballer

Personal information
- Full name: George Boardman
- Date of birth: 14 August 1943 (age 83)
- Place of birth: Glasgow, Scotland
- Position: Inside forward

Youth career
- Petershill

Senior career*
Years	Team	Apps	(Gls)
1960–1963	Queen's Park	54	(16)
1963–1969	Shrewsbury Town	176	(50)
1969–1973	Barnsley	126	(14)
- St Johnstone
- Buxton
Total		356+	(80+)

International career
1963	Scotland Amateur	4	(6)
- * Club domestic league appearances and goals

George Boardman (born 14 August 1943) is a Scottish former professional footballer who played as an inside forward. Active in both Scotland and England between 1960 and 1973, Boardman made over 350 League appearances, scoring nearly 100 goals.

== Playing career ==
Born in Glasgow, Boardman began his career with Petershill, before playing in the Scottish Football League with Queen's Park, and in the English Football League with Shrewsbury Town and Barnsley. He finished his playing career with spells at St Johnstone and Buxton.

He was also a Scotland Amateur international in 1963.

== Later career ==
After retiring as a player due to injury he became a scout, working for Tottenham Hotspur, Middlesbrough, Hibernian, Bradford City and Swansea City.

== Personal life ==
His father George and son Craig, were also professional footballers.
