= Robert S. Calderwood =

Robert Sibbald Calderwood FRSE (1864-1960) was a Church of Scotland minister. He served for 51 years at Cambuslang Old Parish Church.

== Life ==
He was born in Blysthwood, Glasgow on 2 December 1864 the son of Robert Wilson Calderwood and Mary Sibbald. He was educated at the Normal School in Glasgow and then attended Glasgow University.

He was secretary to a famous minister, Rev Dr George Matheson. In 1888 he was a student missionary on Loch Lomond. He was licensed by the Presbytery of Glasgow on 2 June 1889 then became assistant minister at St Matthew's Parish, Glasgow, before moving to Garelochhead (6 February 1890) where he served as minister until 1900. On 3 May 1900 he transferred to the Tolbooth Church in Edinburgh where he served until 1908. He was chaplain to His Majesty's Prison Edinburgh from 1905 until 1908, when he was called to Cambuslang on 24 June 1908. There he served for a staggering 51 years, well into his dotage.

He was elected a Fellow of the Royal Society of Edinburgh in 1910 his proposers being David Fowler Lowe, Robert Taylor Skinner and James Haig Ferguson.

He continued the improvements to the Cambuslang church throughout his life, installing a new Chancel in 1922.

In 1928 he was made a Doctor of Divinity (DD) by Glasgow University.

He died in Edinburgh on 3 March 1960 aged 93.

== Works ==
He produced a series of New Testament Lessons for the Scottish National Sabbath School Lessons in 1911 and in the same year published Patriotism - a coronation address.
