= Glasgow Dental Hospital Cup =

- Founded: 1928
- Region: Glasgow
- Teams: 6
- Current champions: (Scotland) Partick Thistle

The Glasgow Dental Hospital Cup was a one-off football tournament held in Glasgow, Scotland over several dates in November and December 1928 with the purpose of raising funds for the Glasgow Dental Hospital and School which had a new building under construction in the city centre.

== Overview ==
The tournament was played between the city's six senior clubs: Celtic, Clyde, Partick Thistle, Queen's Park, Rangers and Third Lanark. It involved a first round with two byes, two semi-finals and a final – the same arrangement as the annual Glasgow Cup and Glasgow Merchants Charity Cup tournaments which were staged between the same teams near the start and at the end of each season respectively. All six teams were also among the 20 participants in 1928–29 Scottish Division One and would play each other twice more in that competition (the only slight novelty being that Third Lanark had just gained promotion back to the top tier) so there was little in the Dental Hospital Cup's format to generate public interest and poor attendances were recorded, not helped by the fact the fixtures were fitted into the calendar wherever they could, resulting in midweek matches in winter time. The one potential fixture which would have drawn a bigger crowd, Rangers versus Celtic, never materialised, as Partick Thistle beat both the Old Firm teams to claim the cup.

With a trophy and medals at stake, the final between Rangers and Partick was reported as being more keenly contested and with a better standard of play than the earlier matches. A total of £819 (equivalent to around £50,000 90 years later) was raised for the hospital.

== Details ==
First round

6 November 1928

Partick Thistle	1 – 0	Third Lanark
Simpson 45'

Firhill
Attendance: 2,000
Referee: A. H. Leishman
14 November 1928

Celtic	4 – 0	Queen's Park
Riley 7' 30'; McInally 65' 83'

Celtic Park
Attendance: 4,000
Referee: T. Dougray

Semi-finals

28 November 1928

Partick Thistle	3 – 1 (a.e.t.)	Celtic
Ness 57'; Fraser; Gibson		McInally

Hampden Park
Attendance: 3,000
Referee: M. C. Hutton
5 December 1928

Rangers	6 – 0	Clyde
Morton 14'; Marshall; McMillan; Archibald

Ibrox
Attendance: 3,000
Referee: R. Innes

Final

11 December 1928

Partick Thistle	2 – 0	Rangers
Ness 8'; Torbet 42' (pen.)

Hampden Park
Attendance: 5,000
Referee: T. Dougray

== See also ==
- Lord Provost's Rent Relief Cup
