= City of Glasgow College =

College in Glasgow City, Scotland

Coordinates: 55.863°N 4.244°W

- Other names: CoGC; Scotland's Super College
- Former names: Central College, Glasgow; Glasgow Metropolitan College; Glasgow College of Nautical Studies
- Motto: Let Learning Flourish
- Type: Further and Higher Education
- Established: September 2010
- Chairman: Dave Anderson
- Principal: Paul Little
- Students: 27,000
- Location: Glasgow, Scotland
- Colours: Purple and silver
- Website: www.cityofglasgowcollege.ac.uk

The City of Glasgow College is a further and higher education college in the city of Glasgow. It was founded in 2010 when the Central College, Glasgow Metropolitan College, and the Glasgow College of Nautical Studies merged. It is the largest college and technical institution in Scotland.

Located in Scotland's largest city, Glasgow, the college has two campuses: the Riverside Campus situated on the River Clyde and the City Campus located in the city centre. The City Campus was opened in 2016 and Riverside Campus was opened in 1969 as the Glasgow College of Nautical Studies and underwent an extensive refurbishment, opening in 2015. Both developments were contracted by Sir Robert McAlpine with architects Michael Laird and Reiach & Hall. Both campuses were shortlisted for the RIBA Stirling Prize.

== History ==
The City of Glasgow College was originally founded as the Stow College of Hairdressing by the Glasgow Corporation in 1956. The college was initially located on John Street, but later moved to Cathedral Street in 1963 and was renamed the Central College of Commerce and Distribution. In the 1960s, the city corporation commissioned a new home for the College of Building on North Hanover Street. The college originally was located in its present site since 1927, but it taught courses in trade and skills. The new building took four years to build and was one of the first commercial high-rise buildings in Glasgow. The building was opened in 1964 by UK Prime Minister Harold Wilson. On the south bank of the River Clyde, construction was underway in 1967 for the Glasgow College of Nautical Studies. It was opened on 4 October 1969 by Earl Mountbatten of Burma.

In 1972, the College of Building and the College of Printing merged to create Glasgow College of Building and Printing. In the same year, the Central College of Commerce and Distribution reduced its name to the Central College of Commerce. Through the 1970s, the Glasgow College of Nautical Studies began courses other than marine subjects. A General Studies Department was added and the Power Plant Practice Department of Springburn College of Engineering was transferred in 1973. The Glasgow Corporation founded the Glasgow College of Food Technology opened in 1973. It was one of the last city centres colleges to be built by the corporation. The new college saw a rapid growth of Scotland's tourism industry began to take off and the college produced some highly trained chefs, who worked in west end restaurants in Glasgow's Merchant City.

In 1985, the Secretary of State for Scotland announced the centralisation of nautical education in Scotland at Glasgow College of Nautical Studies.

A fall in birth rates, population migration and declining school rolls throughout Glasgow saw the closure of the Allan Glen's Secondary School and the Central College of Commerce adopted the former school as a new campus in 1989. The Central College's main campus was renamed the Charles Oakley, a writer and trade unionist who chaired the college's board. In 2000, the college expanded with the opening of the Central Business Learning Zone and six years later underwent a major refurbishment and was launched as the Central College, Glasgow.

In 2002, the College of Building and Printing and the Central College of Commerce were awarded B-listed status by Historic Scotland, protecting them from future development. Historic Scotland stated: “The buildings are prominent landmarks on the city centre skyline and their significance can be justifiably considered alongside a limited international cast, including Gio Ponti’s Pirelli Tower in Milan.”

In 2004, the College of Nautical Studies opened the brand new £1.8 million "Gateway" building to mark the 35 years of nautical education in Scotland.

The Glasgow Metropolitan College was founded in 2005, becoming Glasgow's largest college, with over 15,000 students and 500 staff across five campuses. Often referred to as ‘The Met’ was established following the merger of the College of Building and Printing and the College of Food Technology.

On 30 August 2010, the Scottish Government voted to merge the Central College, Glasgow, Glasgow Metropolitan College and the Glasgow College of Nautical Studies into one institution known as the City of Glasgow College. Presently, the City of Glasgow College is the largest college and technical institution in Scotland. The college offers up to 2,000 professional and technical courses annually from access level to masters level.

In 2013, construction began for a new £228 million campus for the college. The Riverside Campus was extensively rebuilt, while the site of the Alan Glen's Campus was demolished and replaced with the new City Campus building. The campuses were opened and fully in function by 2017.

== Campuses ==
The twin-site campus of the college cost £228 million to construct.

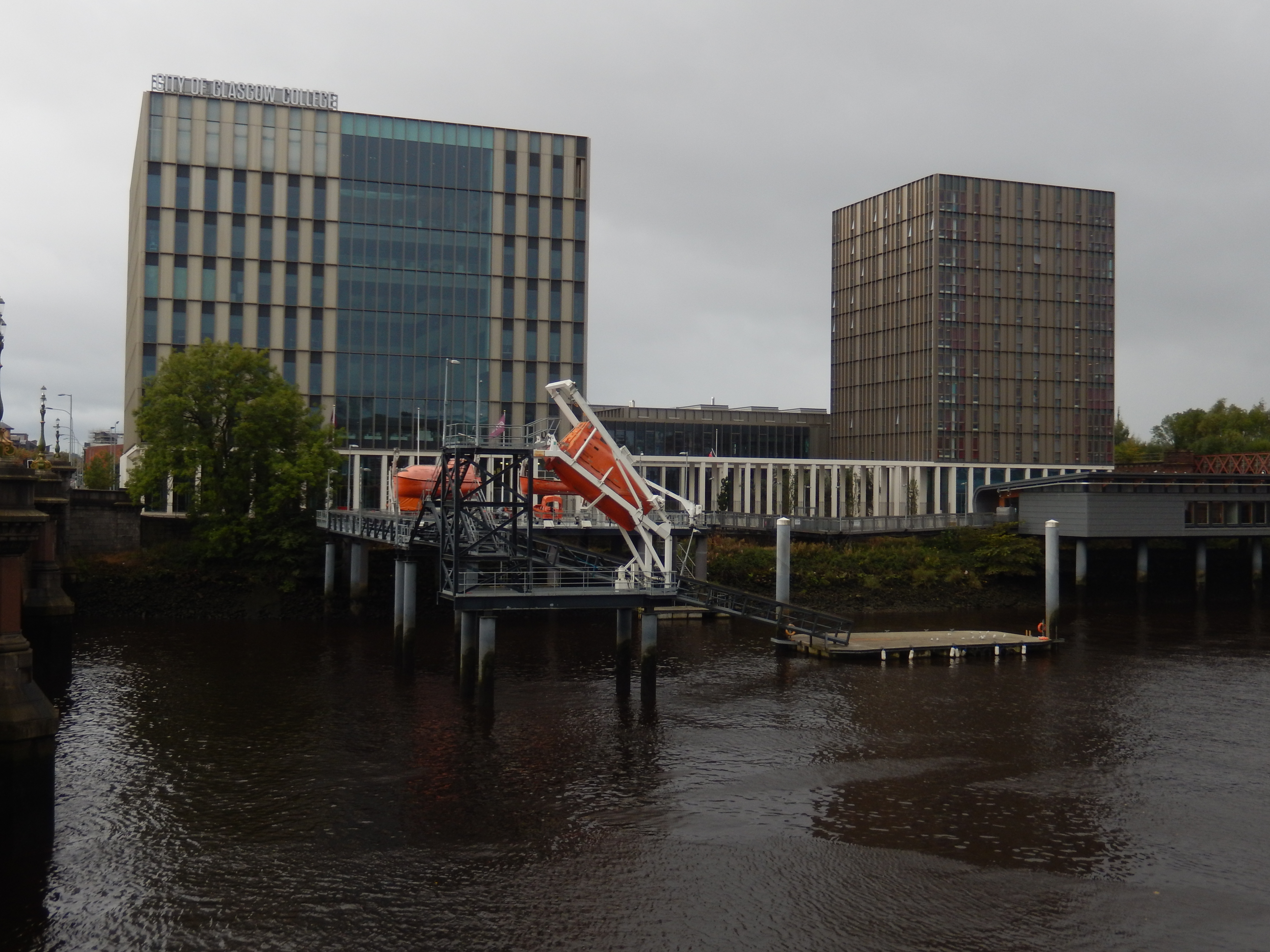
Riverside Campus, originally opened in 1969 as part of the Glasgow College of Nautical Studies.

=== Riverside Campus ===
The Riverside Campus, originally opened in 1969, was extensively rebuilt and officially opened by Nicola Sturgeon, the First Minister of Scotland, on 26 October 2015. It offers courses in nautical science and engineering, and is situated on the south bank of the River Clyde. It also offers Merchant Navy officer training up to Chief Engineer and Master Mariner level. Up to 3,000 cadets study at the nautical faculty which in 2019 celebrated its 50th anniversary since opening.

=== City Campus ===
The City Campus, situated on Cathedral Street in Glasgow, was officially opened by Sophie, Countess of Wessex, in 2016. The main contractor on both developments was Sir Robert McAlpine with architects Michael Laird and Reiach & Hall.

Both campuses were shortlisted for the RIBA Stirling Prize.

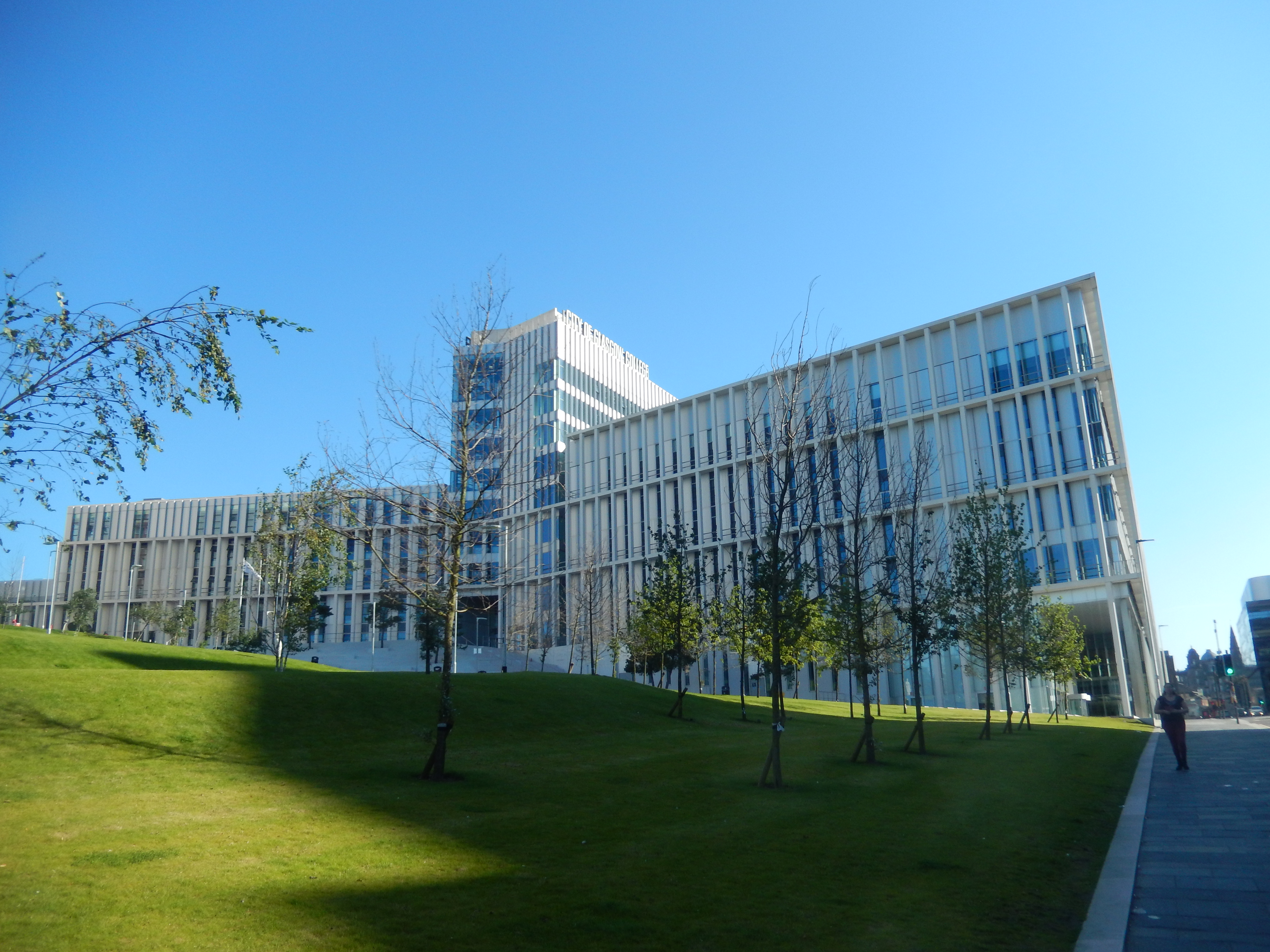
City Campus, opened in 2016

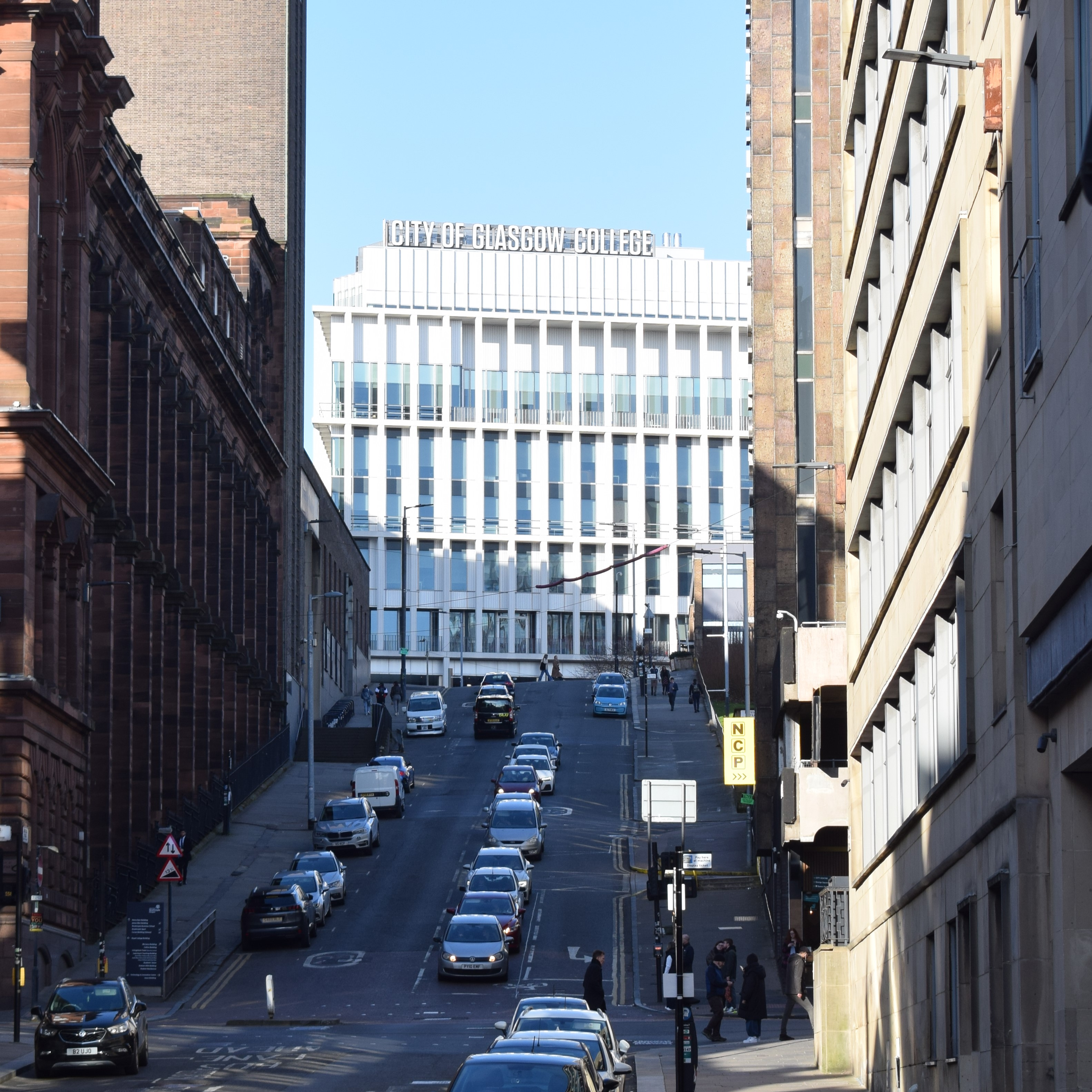
City Campus, as seen from Montrose Street.

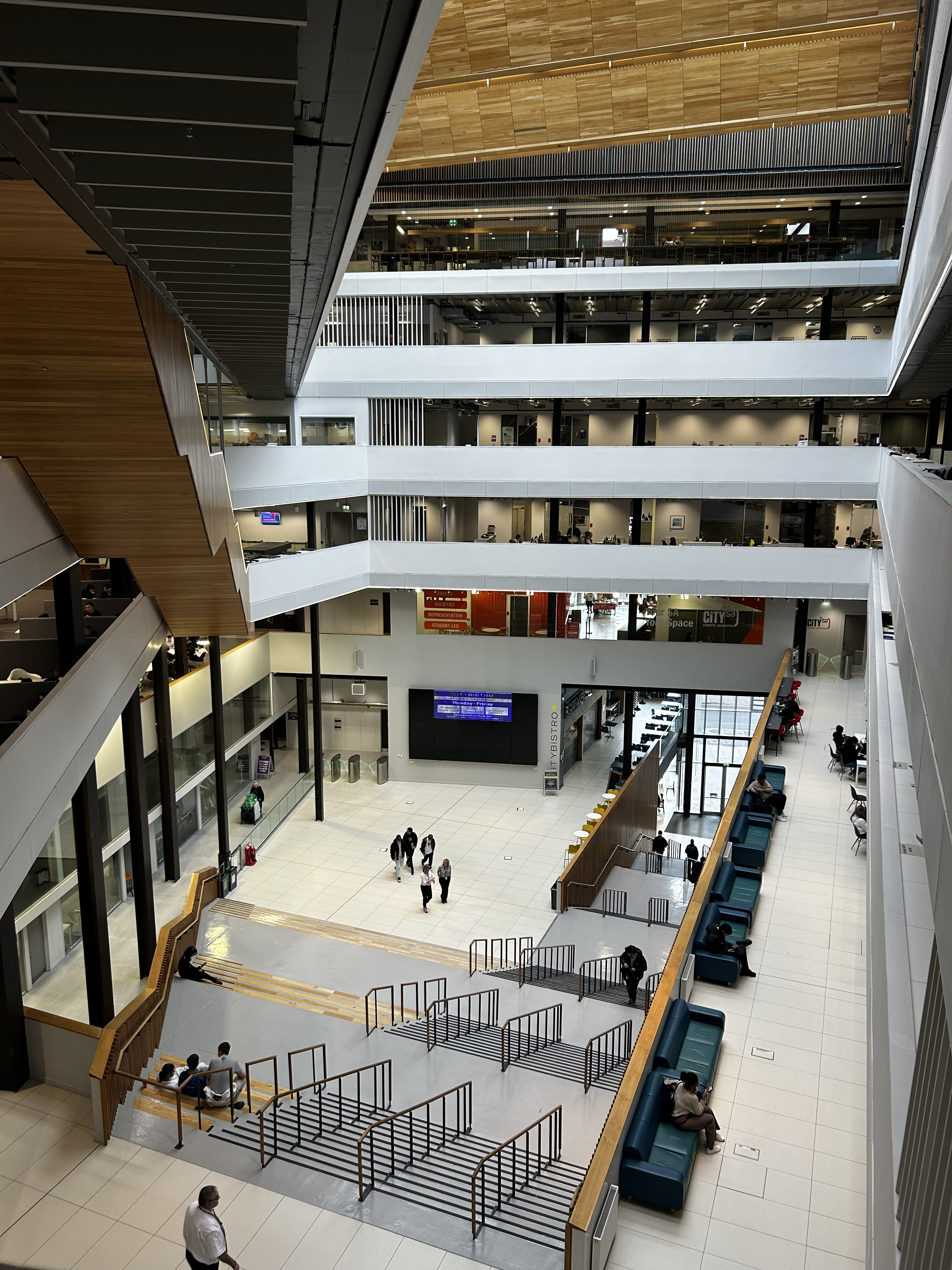
View from the 4th floor of the City Campus

== Students' Association ==
The City of Glasgow College Students' Association is commonly known as CitySA.

It has one sabbatical president with three part-time vice presidents of Social & Activities, Learning & Teaching, and Diversity & Wellbeing.

In 2024–2025, City SA also announced further paid roles for students: Volunteer Ambassador (VA) and Faculty Ambassadors (FA) for all the faculties. Together with the Presidential Team, FA are part of the Student Parliament.

The SA is currently affiliated with the National Union of Students (NUS) Scotland.

In 2023, City SA won the following awards:

- NUS Scotland - Society of the Year (Tabletop Gaming)
- NUS Scotland - College Students' Associations of the Year
- Herald Higher Education - Equality, Diversity, and Inclusion Award
- Sparqs Student Engagement Awards - Outstanding Academic Representative (Megan McClellan)
- Sparqs Student Engagement Awards - Sustainability in the Learning Experience (A Better Tomorrow Competition).
