= John Torbet =

Scottish footballer

Personal information
- Full name: John McDowell Torbet
- Date of birth: 25 September 1903
- Place of birth: Benwhat, Scotland
- Date of death: 16 February 1957 (aged 53)
- Place of death: Edinburgh, Scotland
- Position: Outside left

Senior career*
Years	Team	Apps	(Gls)
–	Cumnock Juniors		
1924–1933	Partick Thistle	212	(91)
1933–1934	Preston North End	11	(4)
1934–1935	Burton Town		
1935–1936	Stockport County	6	(1)
1936–1937	Ayr United	46	(26)
1937	Alloa Athletic	5	(3)
1937–1938	Leith Athletic	2	(0)
Total		282	(124)
- * Club domestic league appearances and goals

John McDowell Torbet (25 September 1903 – 16 February 1957) was a Scottish professional footballer who played as an outside left.

Born in Benwhat, Dalmellington, Ayrshire, he signed for Partick Thistle from Cumnock Juniors in 1924, and went on to become the club's sixth-highest scorer of all time, scoring 116 goals in all competitions. During his nine-year spell at Firhill he played in the 1930 Scottish Cup final (scoring his side's goal in a 2-1 replay defeat to Rangers), and was selected for the Glasgow FA annual challenge match against Sheffield three times.

Torbet then moved to England, playing for Preston North End in 1933 before moving to Burton Town and Stockport County, then returned to Scotland with Ayr United, followed by brief spells with Alloa Athletic and Leith Athletic. After retiring as a player, he became the Heart of Midlothian trainer in April 1946 until 1952.
