= Glasgow College of Nautical Studies =

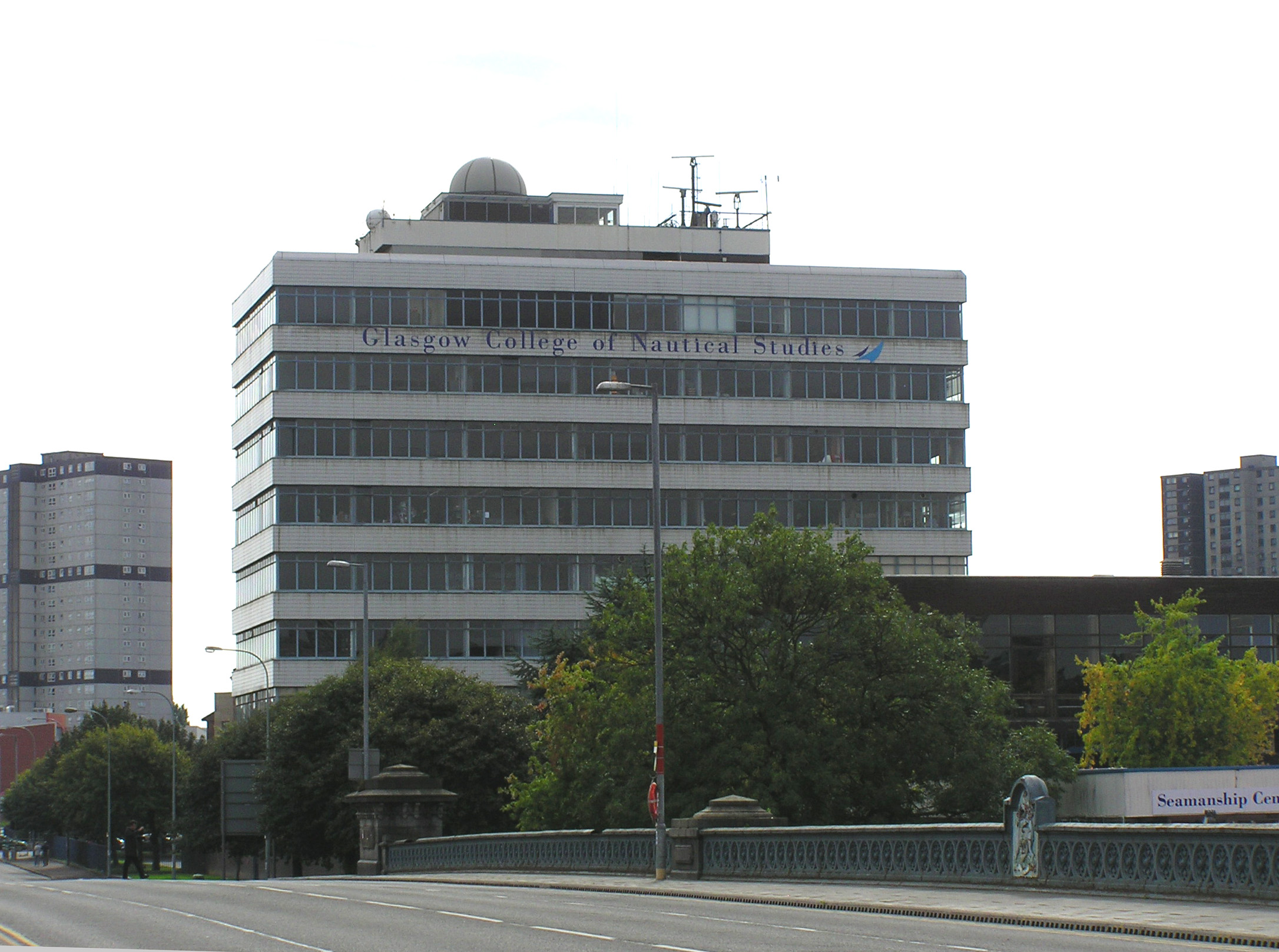
The Glasgow College of Nautical Studies, viewed from the north bank of the Clyde

Glasgow College of Nautical Studies was a further education college of nautical and maritime studies, and a provider of marine and offshore training courses. On 26 March 2009, it was announced that the college would merge with the Central College and Glasgow Metropolitan College. In 2010, the merger was completed the college was absorbed into the City of Glasgow College. Degree courses, in subjects including Naval Architecture and Marine Engineering, were offered in association with the University of Strathclyde.

The college's main building was located on Thistle Street on the south bank of the River Clyde in central Glasgow in western Scotland. The college motto was 'Nautical and So Much More' which tried to encapsulate the breadth of courses offered.

== History ==
In 1910, the Glasgow School of Navigation was founded. The school would be later renamed the Glasgow College of Nautical Studies.

The marine facility at the college was primarily housed in a purpose-built boat shed built in 1968 beside the Clyde. In 1969, the facility was officially opened by Lord Mountbatten. In May 2009, the college secured £5.6 million to replace the shed and construct a new marine college campus. Much of the funding came from the Scottish Funding Council.

In September 2009, the college was partially evacuated due to a chemical incident. In 2010, the college became part of the City of Glasgow College.

== Notable students ==
- Nick Nairn, chef, who joined the merchant navy aged 17
- Scott Kyle, actor

== See also ==
- Trinity House of Leith
