= Walter Underwood & Partners =

Glasgow-based architectural firm

Walter Underwood & Partners were a Glasgow-based firm of architects that operated from 1960 to 1991.

== History ==
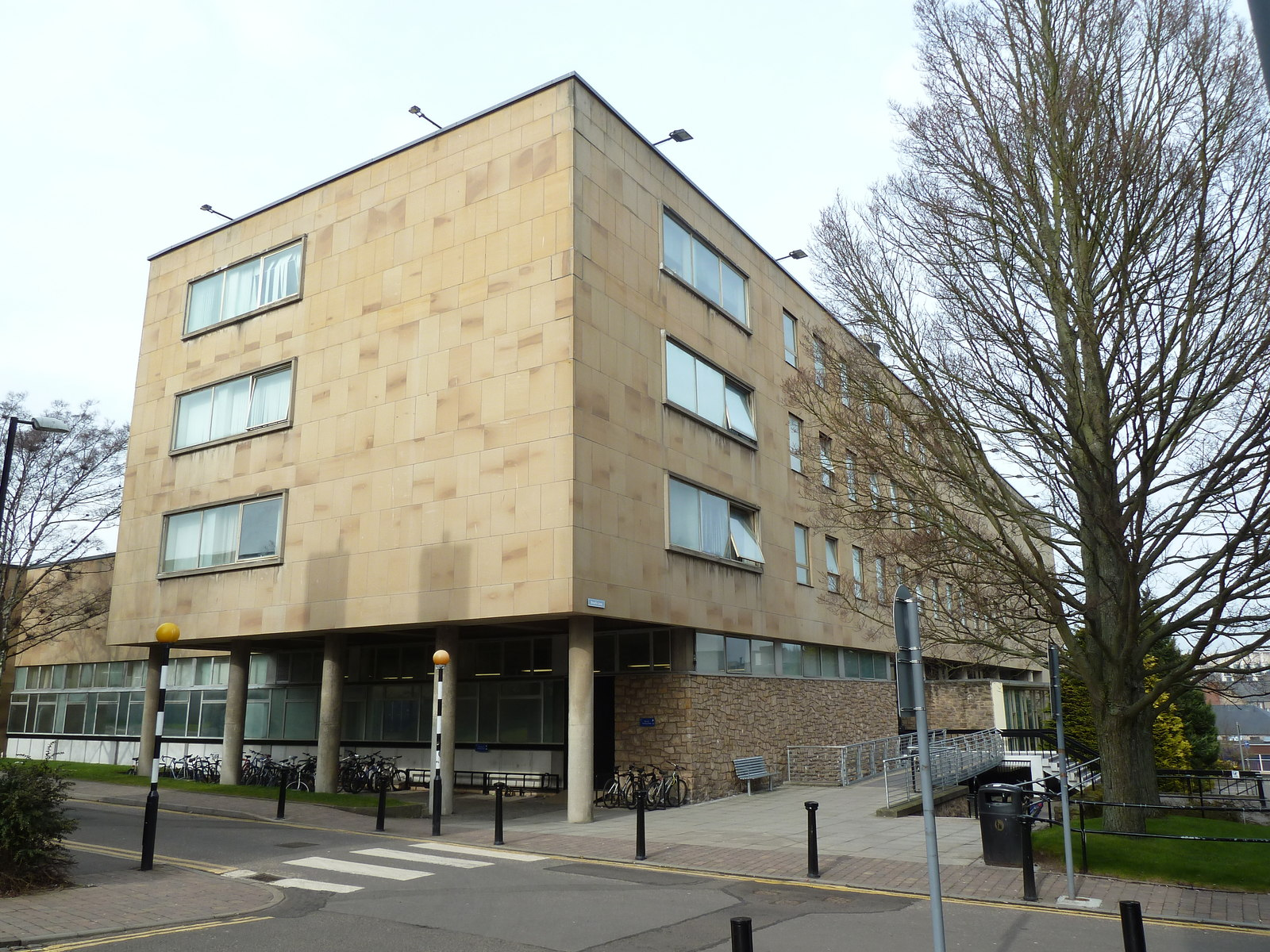
Fulton Building, University of Dundee (1961)

Walter Underwood & Partners was formed in May 1960 by Walter Underwood after leaving Wylie, Shanks & Underwood with colleagues Michael Beale and T George Low. In 1964, three further colleagues were made partners; David J Leslie, James M Paton and William McLean. Peter Williams remained with Wyllie Shanks Architects although continued to do work for both practices.

Underwood died in April 1988, and the partnership was wound up in 1991 when some partners retired.

== Projects ==
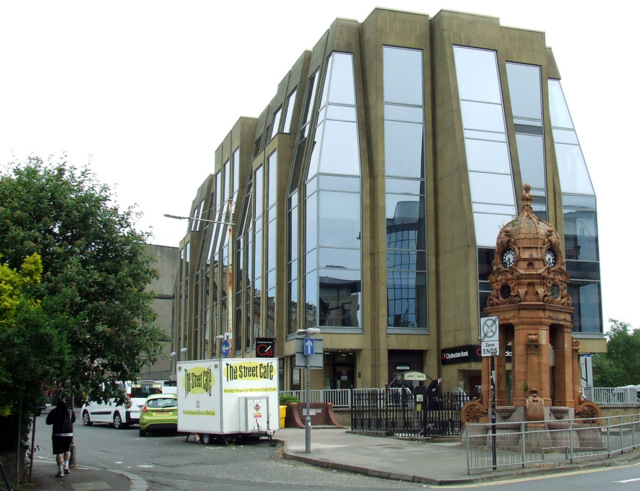
Fountain House, Charing Cross, Glasgow, (1982)

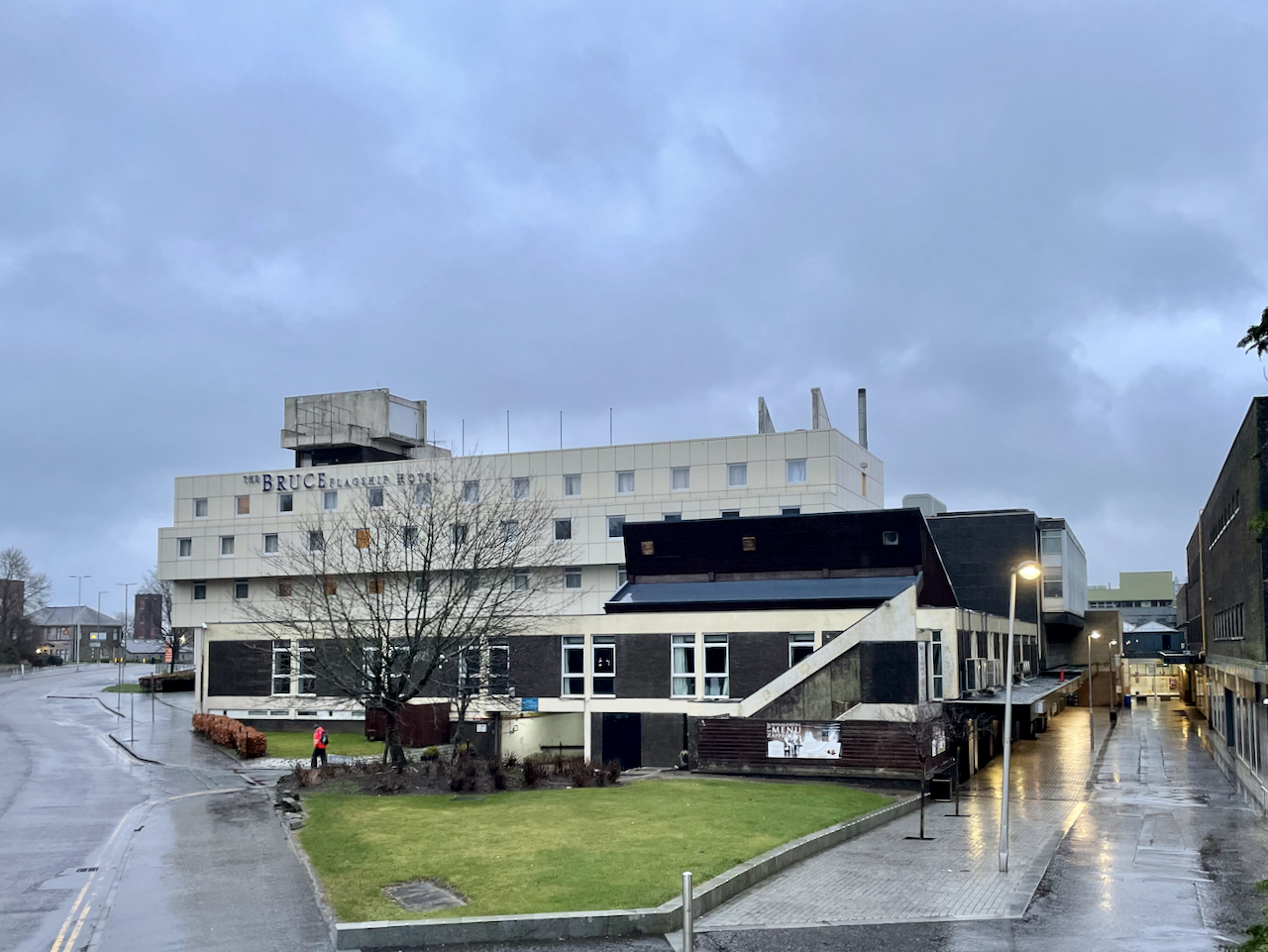
Bruce Hotel, East Kilbride, (1969)

- Fulton Building, University of Dundee, 1962
- Queen Margaret Union, University of Glasgow, 1968
- Bruce Hotel, East Kilbride Shopping Centre, 1969
- Bank of England Branch Treasury, Glasgow, 1970s
- Martyrs Church of Scotland, Townhead, 1975
- Food Science Building, University of Strathclyde, 1981
- Fountain House, Clydesdale Bank, Glasgow, 1982
