= Vita Group =

Australian retailer

Vita Group Limited
- Type: Public company
- Industry: Telecommunications, Information Communication Technology, Technology Accessories, Athleisure
- Predecessor: Fone Zone
- Founded: 1995
- Founder: Maxine Horne; David McMahon
- Defunct: 2023
- Headquarters: Australia
- Subsidiaries: Clear Complexions, Artisan Cosmetic Clinic's, AAG
- Website: www.vitagroup.com.au

Vita Group Limited was an Australian retailer that operates under the brands of Artisan Aesthetic Clinics. Vita Group employs 400 people across its network of brands and is an ASX listed company that in 2020 reported revenues of $773.1 million.

Vita Group was founded by David McMahon and Maxine Horne. David McMahon was the CEO from 1995 to 2013.| Chief Executive Officer]] Vita Group was established to provide Australians with retail outlets where they could purchase mobile phones and other telecommunication products and services. The company commenced trading in 1995 as a Telstra Licensed Dealer under the brand Fone Zone, with its first store opening at Pacific Fair on the Gold Coast. By 2005, Fone Zone had expanded to more than 100 stores Australia-wide and had listed on the Australian Securities Exchange.

In 2008, Fone Zone rebranded itself as Vita Group to reflect its expanded business focus beyond mobile phones, and David McMahon remained involved in the leadership of the company as CEO during this period. Maxine Horne became CEO following McMahon’s retirement in 2013.

== Background ==
From 2005 to 2008, Fone Zone continued to expand and diversify through acquisitions, purchasing Telstra dealer, One Zero Communications in 2005, and Apple reseller, Next Byte in 2007. In 2008, the company officially changed its name to Vita Group Limited.

In 2009, after nearly 15 years as a Telstra Licensed Dealer, Vita Group signed a Dealer and Master Licence Agreement with Telstra, which saw Vita acquire 100 Telstra branded stores.

Vita Group continued to expand from 2010 to 2015, entering the information and communication technology (ICT) sector through acquiring Camelon IT, which it later rebranded to Vita Enterprise Solutions.

By mid-2015, the company had nearly 150 points of presence across Australia, including 100 Telstra licensed stores, 16 Telstra Business Centres, five Fone Zone outlets, 16 One Zero stores and 12 Next Byte stores.

In December 2015, Vita Group made the decision to close its Next Byte brand.

In 2016, the company announced the extension of its Telstra Dealer and Master Lincence Agreement to 2020.

The following year, Vita Group further diversified, expanding into the non-invasive medical aesthetics sector by acquiring Clear Complexions. In 2018, the group added to its portfolio in this market by acquiring Artisan Cosmetic & Rejuvenation Clinic, Fortitude Valley and by launching its own premium medical aesthetics brand, Artisan Aesthetic Clinics.

Vita Group had more than 130 points of presence across Australia, consisting of Telstra Licensed Stores, Telstra Business Centres, and Fone Zone outlets. The company also operates the brands, Sprout, Artisan Aesthetic Clinics, and Vita Enterprise Solutions.

It was delisted from the Australian Securities Exchange in June 2023 after being taken over by Practice Management Pty Ltd.
