= List of Dundee United F.C. seasons =

The following table is a season-by-season summary of league performances for Dundee United.

== Key ==
Key
W	Winners
F	Finalists
SF	Semi-finalists
QF	Quarter-finalists
R1	Round 1, etc.
GS	Group Stage
1st	Champions (league/cup)
2nd	Runners-up (league/cup)
3rd	3rd Place/Semi-finalist
- Promotion
- Relegation

== Pre-War ==
Season	League									Scot. Cup
Season	Division	Pos	P	W	D	L	GF	GA	Pts	Scot. Cup
1909–10	Northern League	4th								–
1910–11	Division Two	11th	22	7	5	10	29	36	19	–
1911–12	Division Two	10th	22	5	5	12	21	41	15	–
1912–13	Division Two	10th	26	6	10	10	34	43	22	R2
1913–14	Division Two	3rd	22	11	4	7	36	31	26	R2
1914–15	Division Two	11th	26	8	3	15	48	61	19	–
1915–16	Eastern League	10th	22	7	1	14	36	57	15	–
1916–17	Eastern League	5th	17	6	3	8	29	3	15	–
1917–18	Eastern League	5th	24	7	5	12	30	48	19	–
1918–19	No Eastern League (friendly matches only)									
1919–20	Eastern League	1st								–
1920–21	Central League	17th	34	10	7	17	39	52	27	–
1921–22	Division Two	19th	38	10	8	20	47	65	28	R1
1922–23	Alliance League									R2
1923–24	Division Two	9th	38	12	15	11	41	41	39	R1
1924–25	Division Two	1st	38	20	10	8	58	44	50	R2
1925–26	Division One	17th	38	11	6	21	52	74	28	R1
1926–27	Division One	20th	38	7	8	23	56	101	22	QF
1927–28	Division Two	6th	38	17	9	12	81	73	43	R2
1928–29	Division Two	1st	36	24	3	9	99	55	51	QF
1929–30	Division One	19th	38	7	8	23	56	109	22	R2
1930–31	Division Two	2nd	38	21	8	9	93	54	50	R2
1931–32	Division One	19th	38	6	7	25	40	118	19	R3
1932–33	Division Two	13th	34	14	4	16	65	67	32	R2
1933–34	Division Two	17th	34	10	4	20	81	88	24	R1
1934–35	Division Two	4th	34	18	6	10	105	65	42	R3
1935–36	Division Two	7th	34	16	5	13	108	81	37	R2
1936–37	Division Two	14th	34	9	9	16	72	97	27	R1
1937–38	Division Two	14th	34	9	5	20	69	104	23	R2
1938–39	Division Two	9th	34	15	3	16	78	69	33	R2
1939–40	Division Two	7th	4	2	1	1	8	7	5	F

== War ==
The Second World War saw the suspension of the major tournaments, with regional tournaments going ahead. Dundee United played in the North Eastern League, which consisted of autumn and season league and cup tournaments. In 1945–56, United played in the Southern League and corresponding league cup tournament.

Season	League									NEL Cup	Other	
Season	Division	Pos	P	W	D	L	GF	GA	Pts	NEL Cup	Other	
1941–42	North Eastern League (First Series)	6th	14	3	4	7	32	45	10	F	–	
1941–42	North Eastern League (Second Series)	4th	14	7	3	4	37	25	17	W	–	
1942–43	North Eastern League (First Series)	6th	14	5	0	9	24	36	10	QF	–	
1942–43	North Eastern League (Second Series)	6th	14	5	1	8	25	32	11	QF	–	
1943–44	North Eastern League (First Series)	5th	14	7	0	7	36	43	14	QF	–	
1943–44	North Eastern League (Second Series)	4th	14	6	1	7	30	39	13	QF	–	
1944–45	North Eastern League (First Series)	7th	18	5	3	10	34	49	13	–	–	
1944–45	North Eastern League (Second Series)	6th	18	7	2	9	31	54	16	R1	–	
1945–46	Southern League B	12th	26	6	3	17	46	70	15	–	Southern Football League Cup	R1
1945–46	Southern League B	12th	26	6	3	17	46	70	15	–	Victory Cup	R1

== Post-War ==
Season	League									Scot. Cup	Leag. Cup	Europe/ Other		Top league goalscorer(s)	
Season	Division	Pos	P	W	D	L	GF	GA	Pts	Scot. Cup	Leag. Cup	Europe/ Other		Top league goalscorer(s)	
1946–47	Division B	10th	26	9	4	13	53	60	22	R1	QF	Supplementary Cup	SF	Alex Lister	18
1947–48	Division B	15th	30	10	2	18	58	88	22	R2	SS	Supplementary Cup	R1	Peter McKay	13
1948–49	Division B	8th	30	10	7	13	60	67	27	R2	SS	Supplementary Cup	R1	Peter McKay	38
1949–50	Division B	7th	30	14	5	11	74	56	33	R2	SS	Supplementary Cup	R1	Peter McKay	35
1950–51	Division B	4th	30	16	4	10	78	58	36	R1	QF			Peter McKay	38
1951–52	Division Two	4th	30	16	5	9	75	60	37	R3	SS	Supplementary Cup	R1	Peter McKay	36
1952–53	Division Two	8th	30	12	5	13	52	56	29	R1	SS			Frank Quinn	24
1953–54	Division Two	15th	30	8	6	16	54	79	22	R1	SS			Peter McKay	26
1954–55	Division Two	13th	30	8	6	16	55	70	22	R4	SS			Tom McGairy	11
1955–56	Division Two	8th	36	12	14	10	78	65	38	R5	SS			Johnny Coyle	43
1956–57	Division Two	13th	36	14	6	16	75	80	34	R6	QF			Johnny Coyle	38
1957–58	Division Two	9th	36	12	9	15	81	77	33	R2	SS			Wilson Humphries	27
1958–59	Division Two	17th	36	9	7	20	62	86	25	R2	SS			Willie McDonald	15
1959–60	Division Two	2nd	36	22	6	8	90	45	50	R2	SS			Jim Irvine	24
1960–61	Division One	9th	34	13	7	14	60	58	33	R2	SS			Dennis Gillespie	15
1961–62	Division One	10th	34	13	6	15	70	71	32	R1	SS				
1962–63	Division One	7th	34	15	11	8	67	52	41	SF	SS				
1963–64	Division One	8th	34	13	8	13	65	49	34	R1	SS				
1964–65	Division One	9th	34	15	6	13	59	51	36	R2	SF				
1965–66	Division One	5th	34	19	5	10	79	51	43	R2	SS				
1966–67	Division One	9th	34	14	9	11	68	62	37	SF	SS	Fairs Cup	R3		
1967–68	Division One	11th	34	10	11	13	53	72	31	R2	SS				
1968–69	Division One	5th	34	17	9	8	61	49	43	QF	SS				
1969–70	Division One	5th	34	16	6	12	62	64	38	R2	SS	Fairs Cup	R1		
1970–71	Division One	6th	34	14	8	12	53	54	36	R4	SS	Fairs Cup	R2		
1971–72	Division One	9th	34	12	7	15	55	70	31	R3	SS	Texaco Cup	R1		
1972–73	Division One	7th	34	17	5	12	56	51	39	R3	R2	Texaco Cup	R1		
1973–74	Division One	8th	34	15	7	12	55	51	37	F	SS	Texaco Cup	SF		
1974–75	Division One	4th	34	19	7	8	72	43	45	R4	SS	Cup Winners' Cup	R2		
1975–76	Premier Division	8th	36	12	8	16	46	48	32	R4	SS	UEFA Cup	R2		
1976–77	Premier Division	4th	36	16	9	11	54	45	41	R3	SS	Anglo-Scottish Cup	R1		
1977–78	Premier Division	3rd	36	16	8	12	42	32	40	SF	QF	UEFA Cup	R1		
1978–79	Premier Division	3rd	36	18	8	10	56	37	44	R3	R2	UEFA Cup	R1		
1979–80	Premier Division	4th	36	12	13	11	43	30	37	R4	W	UEFA Cup; Drybrough Cup	SF		
1980–81	Premier Division	5th	36	17	9	10	66	42	43	F	W	UEFA Cup	R2		
1981–82	Premier Division	4th	36	15	10	11	61	38	40	QF	F	UEFA Cup	QF		
1982–83	Premier Division	1st	36	24	8	4	90	35	56	R3	SF	UEFA Cup	QF		
1983–84	Premier Division	3rd	36	18	11	7	67	39	47	QF	SF	European Cup	SF		
1984–85	Premier Division	3rd	36	20	7	9	67	33	47	F	F	UEFA Cup	R3		
1985–86	Premier Division	3rd	36	18	11	7	59	31	47	SF	SF	UEFA Cup	R3		
1986–87	Premier Division	3rd	44	24	12	8	66	36	60	F	SF	UEFA Cup	F		
1987–88	Premier Division	5th	44	16	15	13	54	47	47	F	QF	UEFA Cup	R2		
1988–89	Premier Division	4th	36	16	12	8	44	26	44	QF	SF	Cup Winners' Cup	R2		
1989–90	Premier Division	4th	36	11	13	12	36	39	35	SF	R3	UEFA Cup	R2		
1990–91	Premier Division	4th	36	17	7	12	41	29	41	F	SF	UEFA Cup	R2		
1991–92	Premier Division	4th	44	19	13	12	66	50	51	R4	QF				
1992–93	Premier Division	4th	44	19	9	16	56	49	47	R4	QF				
1993–94	Premier Division	6th	44	11	20	13	47	48	42	W	SF	UEFA Cup	R1		
1994–95	Premier Division	10th	36	9	9	18	40	56	36	QF	QF	Cup Winners' Cup	R1		
1995–96	First Division	2nd	36	19	10	7	73	37	67	QF	R3	Challenge Cup	F		
1996–97	Premier Division	3rd	36	17	9	10	46	33	60	SF	R3				
1997–98	Premier Division	7th	36	8	13	15	43	51	37	QF	F	UEFA Cup	QR2		
1998–99	Premier League	9th	36	8	10	18	37	48	34	SF	R3				
1999–00	Premier League	8th	36	11	6	19	34	57	39	QF	SF				
2000–01	Premier League	11th	38	9	8	21	38	63	35	SF	QF				
2001–02	Premier League	8th	38	12	10	16	38	59	46	QF	QF				
2002–03	Premier League	11th	38	7	11	20	35	68	32	R3	SF				
2003–04	Premier League	5th	38	13	10	15	47	60	49	R3	R3				
2004–05	Premier League	9th	38	8	12	18	41	59	36	F	SF				
2005–06	Premier League	9th	38	7	12	19	41	66	33	R3	R3	UEFA Cup	QR2		
2006–07	Premier League	9th	38	10	12	16	40	59	42	R4	R3				
2007–08	Premier League	5th	38	14	10	14	53	47	52	R5	F			Noel Hunt	13
2008–09	Premier League	5th	38	13	14	11	47	50	53	R5	SF			Francisco Sandaza	10
2009–10	Premier League	3rd	38	17	12	9	55	47	63	W	QF			Jon Daly	13
2010–11	Premier League	4th	38	17	10	11	55	50	61	QF	QF	Europa League	QR4	David Goodwillie	18
2011–12	Premier League	4th	38	16	11	11	62	50	59	QF	QF	Europa League	QR2	Jon Daly	19
2012–13	Premier League	6th	38	11	14	13	51	62	47	SF	QF	Europa League	QR3	Johnny Russell	20
2013–14	Premiership	4th	38	16	10	12	65	50	58	F	QF			Nadir Çiftçi	17
2014–15	Premiership	5th	38	17	5	16	58	56	56	QF	F			Nadir Çiftçi	16
2015–16	Premiership	12th	38	8	7	23	45	70	28	SF	QF			Billy Mckay	9
2016–17	Championship	3rd	36	15	12	9	50	42	57	R4	QF	Challenge Cup	W	Tony Andreu	19
2017–18	Championship	3rd	36	18	7	11	52	42	61	R2	R5	Challenge Cup	QF	Scott McDonald	10
2018–19	Championship	2nd	36	17	8	9	49	40	65	QF	GS	Challenge Cup	R2	Pavol Šafranko	12
2019–20	Championship	1st	28	18	5	5	52	22	59	R4	GS	Challenge Cup	R3	Lawrence Shankland	24
2020–21	Premiership	9th	38	10	14	14	32	50	44	SF	GS			Nicky Clark	8
2021–22	Premiership	4th	38	12	12	14	37	44	48	QF	QF			Nicky Clark	8
2022–23	Premiership	12th	38	8	7	23	40	70	31	R5	QF	Conference League	QR3	Steven Fletcher	9
2023–24	Championship	1st	36	22	9	5	73	23	75	R3	GS	Challenge Cup	QF	Louis Moult	18
2024–25	Premiership	4th	38	15	8	15	45	54	53	R4	QF			Sam Dalby	15
2025–26	Premiership	7th	38	10	15	13	49	60	45	QF	R2	Conference League	QR3	Zac Sapsford	9
2026–27	Premiership	6th	12	4	5	3	17	17	17						

Sources:

- LondonHearts.com
