= List of Partick Thistle F.C. seasons =

This is a list of seasons played by Partick Thistle from 1877 to the present day. It details the club's achievements in major competitions, and the top league goal scorers for each season.

== Seasons ==
Season	League									Scottish Cup	League Cup	Other Competitions	Top league goalscorer	
Season	Division	P	W	D	L	F	A	Pts	Pos	Scottish Cup	League Cup	Other Competitions	Name	Goals
1877–78												West of Scotland Cup - R4		
1878–79												West of Scotland Cup - W		
1879–80														
1880–81										R3				
1881–82										R5				
1882–83										R6				
1883–84										R4				
1884–85										R1				
1885–86										R4		FA Cup - R1		
1886–87										R1		FA Cup - R5		
1887–88										R5		Glasgow Cup - R1		
1888–89										R1		Glasgow Cup - RU		
1889–90										R1		Glasgow Cup - R3		
1890–91										R1		Glasgow Cup - SF		
1891–92	Scottish Alliance	22	8	3	11	48	66	19	9th	Q2		Glasgow Cup - R2		
1892–93	Scottish Alliance	18	7	1	10	44	61	15	6th	Q3		Glasgow Cup - R2		
1893–94	Division Two	18	7	5	6	32	35	19	5th	Q1		Glasgow Cup - R1		
1894–95	Division Two	18	8	2	8	51	59	18	7th	Q2		Glasgow Cup - SF		
1895–96	Division Two	18	8	2	8	44	54	18	6th	Q2		Glasgow Cup - R3		
1896–97	Division Two	18	14	3	1	61	28	31	1st	Q4		Glasgow Cup - R2		
1897–98	Division One	18	6	1	11	34	64	13	8th	R1		Glasgow Cup - R1	John Ferguson	8
1898–99	Division One	18	2	2	14	19	58	6	9th	R3		Glasgow Cup - R1	James Kirkland	4
1899–1900	Division Two	18	14	1	3	56	26	29	1st	R3		Glasgow Cup - R1	William Freebairn	17
1900–01	Division One	20	4	2	14	28	49	10	11th	R1		Glasgow Cup - RU	Tommy Hyslop	6
1901–02	Division Two	22	14	3	5	55	26	31	2nd	R1		Glasgow Cup - R3	John Muirhead	12
1902–03	Division One	22	6	7	9	34	50	19	7th	R1		Glasgow Cup - R2	Sam Kennedy	11
1903–04	Division One	26	10	7	9	46	41	27	7th	R1		Glasgow Cup - R1	Sam Kennedy	7
1903–04	Division One	26	10	7	9	46	41	27	7th	R1		Glasgow Cup - R1	William Massey	7
1904–05	Division One	26	12	2	12	36	56	26	6th	R3		Glasgow Cup - R2	Sam Kennedy	13
1905–06	Division One	30	15	6	9	44	40	36	5th	R2		Glasgow Cup - R1	Sam Kennedy	13
1906–07	Division One	34	9	8	17	40	60	26	14th	R1		Glasgow Cup - R1	Alex McGregor	12
1907–08	Division One	34	8	9	17	43	69	25	14th	R2		Glasgow Cup - R1	Sam Kennedy	11
1908–09	Division One	34	2	4	28	38	102	8	18th	R2		Glasgow Cup - R1	Fred Robertson	8
1909–10	Division One	34	8	10	16	45	59	26	16th	Q4		Glasgow Cup - R1	William Gardner	11
1910–11	Division One	34	17	8	9	50	41	42	4th	R2		Glasgow Cup - R1	William Gardner	13
1911–12	Division One	34	16	8	10	47	40	40	5th	R1		Glasgow Cup - RU	James Marshall	9
1912–13	Division One	34	10	4	20	40	55	24	17th	R3		Glasgow Cup - R1	Frank Branscombe	15
1913–14	Division One	38	10	9	19	37	51	29	15th	R4		Glasgow Cup - R1	James Marshall	10
1914–15	Division One	38	15	8	15	56	58	38	8th			Glasgow Cup - RU	Willie Whittle	19
1915–16	Division One	38	19	8	11	65	41	46	5th			Glasgow Cup - R2	Neil Harris	16
1916–17	Division One	38	14	7	14	44	43	45	9th			Glasgow Cup - R1	John Bowie	13
1917–18	Division One	34	14	12	8	51	37	40	6th			Glasgow Cup - RU	Neil Harris	16
1918–19	Division One	34	17	7	10	62	43	41	4th			Glasgow Cup - R1	John Bowie	18
1919–20	Division One	42	13	12	17	51	62	38	13th	R3		Glasgow Cup - RU	Neil Harris	23
1920–21	Division One	42	17	12	13	53	39	46	6th	W		Glasgow Cup - R1	Jimmy McMullan	11
1920–21	Division One	42	17	12	13	53	39	46	6th	W		Glasgow Cup - R1	John Blair	11
1921–22	Division One	42	20	8	14	57	53	48	6th	QF		Glasgow Cup - R1	John Blair	12
1921–22	Division One	42	20	8	14	57	53	48	6th	QF		Glasgow Cup - R1	Jimmy Kinloch	12
1922–23	Division One	38	14	9	15	51	48	37	11th	R2		Glasgow Cup - R1	Jimmy Kinloch]	10
1923–24	Division One	38	15	9	14	58	55	39	8th	R4		Glasgow Cup - R1	Sandy Hair	16
1924–25	Division One	38	14	10	14	60	61	38	7th	R3		Glasgow Cup - SF	John Miller	15
1925–26	Division One	38	10	13	15	64	73	33	14th	R2		Glasgow Cup - R1	John Miller	15
1926–27	Division One	38	15	6	17	87	74	36	11th	SF		Glasgow Cup - R1	Sandy Hair	41
1927–28	Division One	38	18	7	13	85	67	35	6th	R4		Glasgow Cup - R1	Harry Gibson	21
1928–29	Division One	38	17	7	14	91	70	41	6th	R2		Glasgow Cup - R1	John Torbet	18
1929–30	Division One	38	16	9	13	72	61	41	6th	RU		Glasgow Cup - R1	John Simpson	18
1930–31	Division One	38	24	5	9	76	43	53	4th	R2		Glasgow Cup - R1	John Simpson	25
1931–32	Division One	38	19	4	15	58	59	42	6th	R3		Glasgow Cup - R1	Evelyn Morrison	15
1932–33	Division One	38	17	6	15	75	55	40	10th	R3		Glasgow Cup - RU	John Torbet	17
1933–34	Division One	38	14	5	19	73	78	33	13th	R2		Glasgow Cup - R1	Sandy McLennan	11
1934–35	Division One	38	15	5	18	61	68	35	13th	R2		Glasgow Cup - W	Sandy McLennan	15
1935–36	Division One	38	12	10	16	62	72	34	10th	R1		Glasgow Cup - R1	George Wylie	15
1936–37	Division One	38	11	12	15	73	68	34	13th	R3		Glasgow Cup - RU	John Wallace	26
1937–38	Division One	38	15	9	14	68	70	39	7th	R3		Glasgow Cup - SF	John Wallace	23
1938–39	Division One	38	17	4	17	74	87	38	11th	R1		Glasgow Cup - R1	John Wallace	28
1939–40	Western Division	30	10	6	14	57	74	26	11th			Glasgow Cup - R1	Sammy Picken	9
1940–41	Southern League	30	9	8	13	55	62	26	12th			Glasgow Cup - RU	Willie Sharp	13
1941–42	Southern League	30	8	10	12	68	70	26	12th			Glasgow Cup - R2	William Newall	30
1942–43	Southern League	30	9	8	13	63	67	26	11th			Glasgow Cup - R2	William Newall	13
1943–44	Southern League	30	11	5	14	62	66	27	10th			Glasgow Cup - R2	William Newall	21
1944–45	Southern League	30	12	1	17	55	74	25	12th			Glasgow Cup - R1	Willie Sharp	8
1944–45	Southern League	30	12	1	17	55	74	25	12th			Glasgow Cup - R1	T Doonan	8
1945–46	Southern League A	30	11	4	15	54	65	26	12th			Glasgow Cup - R2	Joe McGeachy	16
1945–46	Southern League A	30	11	4	15	54	65	26	12th			Victory Cup - QF	Joe McGeachy	16
1946–47	A Division	30	16	3	11	74	59	35	5th	R1	R6	Glasgow Cup - R2	David Mathie	17
1947–48	A Division	30	16	4	10	61	42	36	3rd	R3	R6	Glasgow Cup - R2	Tommy Wright	15
1948–49	A Division	30	9	9	12	50	63	27	11th	QF	R6	Glasgow Cup - R1	Jimmy Walker	12
1949–50	A Division	30	13	3	13	55	45	29	7th	SF	QF	Glasgow Cup - R1	Jimmy Walker	18
1950–51	A Division	30	13	7	10	57	48	33	6th	R1	R6	Glasgow Cup - W	Alex Stott	10
1951–52	A Division	30	12	7	11	48	51	31	6th	R1	R6	Glasgow Cup - R1	Alex Stott	15
1952–53	A Division	30	10	9	11	55	63	29	9th	R2	R6	Glasgow Cup - W	Alex Stott	16
1952–53	A Division	30	10	9	11	55	63	29	9th	R2	R6	Glasgow Cup - W	Bobby Howitt	16
1953–54	A Division	30	17	1	12	76	54	35	3rd	R4	RU	Glasgow Cup - R1	Willie Sharp	21
1954–55	A Division	30	11	7	12	49	61	29	9th	R5	R6	Glasgow Cup - W	George Smith	12
1955–56	A Division	34	13	14	7	62	60	33	9th	QF	R6	Glasgow Cup - R2	Willie Sharp	13
1956–57	Division One	34	13	8	13	53	51	34	8th	R5	RU	Glasgow Cup - R1	Ian McIntosh	13
1957–58	Division One	34	17	3	14	69	71	37	6th	R2	R6	Glasgow Cup - SF	Davie McParland	14
1958–59	Division One	34	14	6	14	59	66	34	9th	R3	RU	Glasgow Cup - R1	Andy Kerr	15
1959–60	Division One	34	14	4	16	54	78	32	9th	R4	R6	Glasgow Cup - RU	George Smith	17
1960–61	Division One	34	13	6	15	58	69	32	11th	R3	R3	Glasgow Cup - W	Joe McBride	14
1961–62	Division One	34	16	3	15	60	55	35	7th	R2	R1	Glasgow Cup - R1	Joe McBride	15
1962–63	Division One	34	20	6	8	66	44	46	3rd	R4	QF	Glasgow Cup - R1	Neil Duffy	17
1963–64	Division One	34	15	5	14	55	54	35	7th	R3	R1	Inter-Cities Fairs Cup - R2	Neil Duffy	13
1963–64	Division One	34	15	5	14	55	54	35	7th	R3	R1	Glasgow Cup - R1	Neil Duffy	13
1964–65	Division One	34	11	10	13	57	58	32	11th	R3	R1	Glasgow Cup - R1	Tommy Ewing	13
1965–66	Division One	34	10	10	14	55	64	30	12th	R2	R1	Glasgow Cup - R1	Andy Roxburgh	15
1966–67	Division One	34	9	12	13	49	68	30	12th	R2	R1	Glasgow Cup - RU	Johnnie Flanagan	10
1967–68	Division One	34	12	7	15	51	67	31	10th	R4	R1	Glasgow Cup - R1	Tommy Rae	15
1968–69	Division One	34	9	10	15	39	53	28	14th	R1	R1	Glasgow Cup - RU	Jimmy Bone	13
1969–70	Division One	34	5	7	22	41	82	17	18th	R1	R1	Glasgow Cup - R1	Jimmy Bone	14
1970–71	Division Two	34	23	10	3	78	26	56	1st	R1	QF		Frank Coulston	20
1971–72	Division One	34	12	10	12	53	54	34	7th	R3	W		Denis McQuade	12
1972–73	Division One	34	10	8	16	40	53	28	13th	R5	R2	UEFA Cup - R1	Ronnie Glavin	9
1973–74	Division One	34	9	10	15	33	46	28	11th	R4	R1		Ronnie Glavin	9
1974–75	Division One	34	10	10	14	48	62	30	13th	R3	QF		Joe Craig	15
1975–76	First Division	34	17	7	2	47	19	41	1st	R4	SF		Doug Somner	16
1976–77	Premier Division	36	11	12	13	40	44	35	5th	R3	R1	Anglo Scottish Cup - SF	Doug Somner	10
1977–78	Premier Division	36	14	5	17	52	62	33	7th	SF	R2	Anglo Scottish Cup - QF	Doug Somner	15
1978–79	Premier Division	36	13	8	15	42	39	34	8th	SF	R2	Anglo Scottish Cup - QF	Doug Somner	11
1979–80	Premier Division	36	11	14	11	43	47	36	7th	QF	R3	Anglo Scottish Cup - QF	Colin McAdam	17
1980–81	Premier Division	36	10	10	16	32	48	30	6th	R3	QF	Anglo Scottish Cup - R1	Tony Higgins	7
1980–81	Premier Division	36	10	10	16	32	48	30	6th	R3	QF	Anglo Scottish Cup - R1	Alex O'Hara	7
1981–82	Premier Division	36	6	10	20	35	59	22	9th	R3	R1		Mo Johnston	9
1982–83	First Division	39	20	9	10	66	45	49	4th	QF	QF		Mo Johnston	21
1983–84	First Division	39	19	8	12	67	50	46	3rd	R3	R2		Kenny McDowall	13
1984–85	First Division	39	13	9	17	50	55	35	11th	R3	R1		Alan Logan	12
1985–86	First Division	39	10	16	13	53	64	36	8th	R3	R2		Gordon Smith	11
1986–87	First Division	44	12	15	17	49	54	39	8th	R3	R2		Colin West	10
1987–88	First Division	44	16	9	19	60	64	41	8th	R5	R2		Eddie Gallagher	13
1988–89	First Division	44	13	11	15	57	58	37	8th	R4	R2		Gerry McCoy	20
1989–90	First Division	44	12	14	13	62	53	38	8th	R3	R2		Calum Campbell	17
1990–91	First Division	44	16	13	10	56	53	45	4th	R3	R3	Challenge Cup - R1	David Elliot	13
1991–92	First Division	44	23	11	10	62	36	57	2nd	R3	R3	Challenge Cup - R2	Colin McGlashan	18
1992–93	Premier Division	44	12	12	20	50	71	36	8th	R3	R3		Gerry Britton	12
1993–94	Premier Division	44	12	16	16	46	57	40	9th	R3	QF		Albert Craig	14
1994–95	Premier Division	36	10	13	13	40	50	43	8th	R3	R3		Calum Milne	7
1995–96	Premier Division	36	8	6	22	29	62	30	9th	R3	QF	UEFA Intertoto Cup - Group Stage	Calum Milne	5
1996–97	First Division	36	12	12	12	49	48	48	6th	R3	QF	Challenge Cup - R3	David Moss	11
1997–98	First Division	36	8	12	16	45	55	36	9th	R3	R2	Challenge Cup - R1	Jered Stirling	6
1998–99	Second Division	36	12	7	17	36	45	43	8th	R3	R1		Robert Dunn	10
1999–2000	Second Division	36	12	10	14	42	44	46	5th	QF	R1	Challenge Cup - R1	Peter Lindau	4
1999–2000	Second Division	36	12	10	14	42	44	46	5th	QF	R1	Challenge Cup - R1	Albert Craig	4
1999–2000	Second Division	36	12	10	14	42	44	46	5th	QF	R1	Challenge Cup - R1	Scott Miller	4
1999–2000	Second Division	36	12	10	14	42	44	46	5th	QF	R1	Challenge Cup - R1	Derek Lyle	4
2000–01	Second Division	36	22	9	5	66	32	75	1st	R3	R1	Challenge Cup - R1	Scott McLean	16
2001–02	First Division	36	19	9	8	61	38	66	1st	SF	R2	Challenge Cup - QF	Gerry Britton	12
2002–03	Premier League	38	8	11	19	37	58	35	10th	R3	QF		Alex Burns	16
2003–04	Premier League	38	6	8	24	39	67	26	12th	QF	R3		James Grady	15
2004–05	First Division	36	10	9	17	38	52	39	9th	R3	R3	Challenge Cup - QF	Juan Ramon Escalas	14
2005–06	Second Division	36	16	9	11	57	56	57	4th	QF	R2	Challenge Cup - R2	Mark Roberts	22
2006–07	First Division	36	12	9	15	47	63	45	7th	QF	R2	Challenge Cup - R1	Mark Roberts	16
2007–08	First Division	36	11	12	13	40	39	45	6th	QF	R3	Challenge Cup - R3	Liam Buchanan	14
2008–09	First Division	36	16	7	13	39	35	55	2nd	R4	R3	Challenge Cup - SF	Gary Harkins	12
2009–10	First Division	36	14	6	16	43	40	48	6th	R4	R2	Challenge Cup - QF	Liam Buchanan	11
2010–11	First Division	36	12	11	13	44	39	47	5th	R5	R2	Challenge Cup - SF	Kris Doolan	15
2011–12	First Division	36	12	11	13	50	39	47	6th	R4	R1	Challenge Cup - R2	Paul Cairney	14
2012–13	First Division	36	23	9	4	76	28	78	1st	R4	R2	Challenge Cup - RU	Kris Doolan	15
2012–13	First Division	36	23	9	4	76	28	78	1st	R4	R2	Challenge Cup - RU	Chris Erskine	15
2013–14	Premiership	38	8	14	16	46	65	38	10th	R4	R3		Kris Doolan	11
2014–15	Premiership	38	12	10	16	48	44	46	8th	R5	QF		Kris Doolan	9
2015–16	Premiership	38	12	10	16	41	50	46	9th	R5	R2		Kris Doolan	14
2016–17	Premiership	38	10	12	16	38	54	42	6th	QF	R2		Kris Doolan	14
2017–18	Premiership	38	8	9	21	31	62	33	11th	R5	QF		Kris Doolan	11
2018–19	Championship	36	6	8	13	43	52	43	6th	QF	R2	Challenge Cup - R2	Blair Spittal	7
2019–20	Championship	27	6	8	13	32	47	26	10th	R4	QF	Challenge Cup - SF	Kenny Miller	5
2020–21	League One	22	11	7	4	40	18	40	1st	R3	GS		Brian Graham	11
2021–22	Championship	36	14	10	12	46	40	52	4th	R5	GS	Challenge Cup - R3	Brian Graham	13
2022–23	Championship	36	16	9	11	65	45	57	4th	R5	QF	Challenge Cup - R3	Brian Graham	13
2023–24	Championship	36	14	13	9	63	54	55	3rd	R5	R2	Challenge Cup - R3	Brian Graham	20
2024–25	Championship	36	15	10	11	43	38	55	4th	R3	GS	Challenge Cup - R3	Brian Graham	15
