= History of Aberdeen F.C. =

History of a Scottish football club

Aberdeen Football Club are one of Scotland's most successful football teams, with 18 major domestic trophy wins: four League titles with 17 runners-up finishes, eight Scottish Cups with nine final defeats, and six Scottish League Cups with nine final defeats (as of March 2020). They are the only Scottish team to have won two European trophies – the European Cup Winners' Cup against Real Madrid on 11 May 1983 and the European Super Cup against the European Cup holders Hamburger SV in December 1983.

Aberdeen also have the distinction of never having been relegated: other than two seasons during World War I when they dropped out of competitive football for logistical reasons and were subsequently re-admitted, they have spent every year since 1905 as members of the top division, a record bettered only by Celtic.

== Origins of the club ==
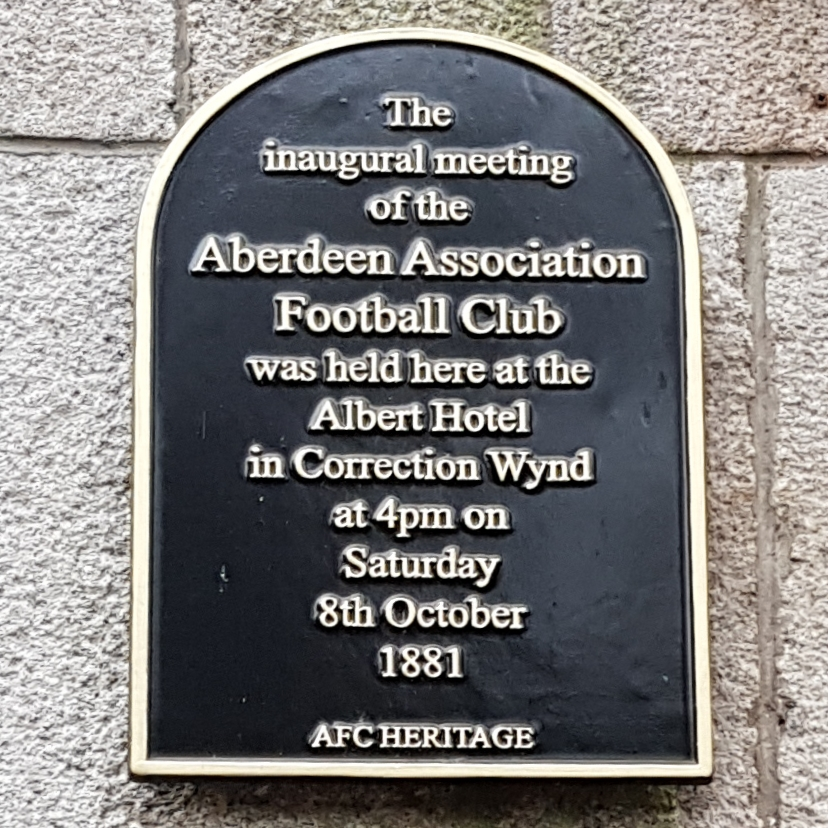
Plaque commemorating the inaugural meeting of Aberdeen Association Football Club in 1881

The Aberdeen FC was born out of the merger of three city clubs; Aberdeen, Victoria United and Orion. A public meeting on 20 March 1903 was attended by more than 1,600 citizens, and on that date the amalgamation issue was discussed and given the go-ahead. On 14 April 1903 (123 years ago) the merger was made official and Aberdeen Football Club was born.

The merger allowed Aberdeen (wearing an all-white kit) to seriously entertain thoughts of joining the Scottish Football League, but had to settle with spending its inaugural season in the Northern League having narrowly failed to gain admission to the First Division.

== Early years (1903–1917) ==
The new club played its first match on 15 August 1903, a 1–1 draw with Stenhousemuir - the goalscorer was William McAulay. That first season produced a win in the Aberdeenshire Cup, but only a third-place finish in the Northern League. Undaunted, the club applied for membership of the Scottish League for the following season, and were duly elected, although to the Second Division, rather than the First which the directors had aspired to.

With the arrival of League football in 1904–05, Aberdeen changed kit colours to black and gold, resulting in the new nickname of the Wasps. The club at this time was managed by Jimmy Philip, and he steered the club to a Scottish Qualifying Cup win on 26 November 1904, a 2–0 victory over Renton at Dens Park. At the end of that first season, despite having finished seventh out of 12 teams, Aberdeen were elected to the new, expanded First Division, and have been in the top tier of Scottish football ever since, a record shared with only Celtic.

Once in the First Division, however, the club's progress was steady rather than spectacular – a Scottish Cup semi-final appearance in 1908 and another in 1911 being the highlights of the pre-war period. In that season of 1910–11, Aberdeen recorded their first victories over the Old Firm, and led the league for a time, but the silverware ended up in Glasgow as was becoming customary.

Wartime affected the club as much as any other, and in spite of spending cuts and other economies, by 1917 the situation was untenable and, along with Dundee and Raith Rovers, Aberdeen dropped out of competitive football for two seasons.

== Between the wars (1919–1939) ==
Senior football returned to the north-east of Scotland on 16 August 1919, The Dons (as they had been known since 1913) resuming with a fixture against Albion Rovers. Philip was still in charge, and continued to oversee a team capable of isolated good results, but never quite able to sustain a challenge long enough to win a trophy.

In 1923, Aberdeen were drawn against Peterhead in the Scottish Cup, and posted their record score – a 13–0 victory. The game took place in torrential rain, and it is recorded that the Aberdeen goalkeeper, Harry Blackwell, played in a waterproof coat, and spent at least part of the game sheltered under a spectator's umbrella.

One of the Wembley Wizards, Scottish international Alex Jackson, played for Aberdeen from 1924 to 1925.

Philip retired in 1924, and was replaced as manager by Paddy Travers. Travers's Aberdeen sides were no more successful than his predecessors', but he did preside over the team's first Scottish Cup final in 1937, as well as two close-season tours to South Africa, the second of which, soon after the Cup final defeat, ended in tragedy when outside-right Jackie Benyon died of peritonitis.

In November 1931, Travers unexpectedly dropped a number of first team regulars, none of whom played for the club again. It wasn't until the publication of the club's official history in the 1970s that it became clear that there had been a suspicion of a betting scandal; no action was taken against any player at the time.

=== Donald Colman and the 'dug-out' ===
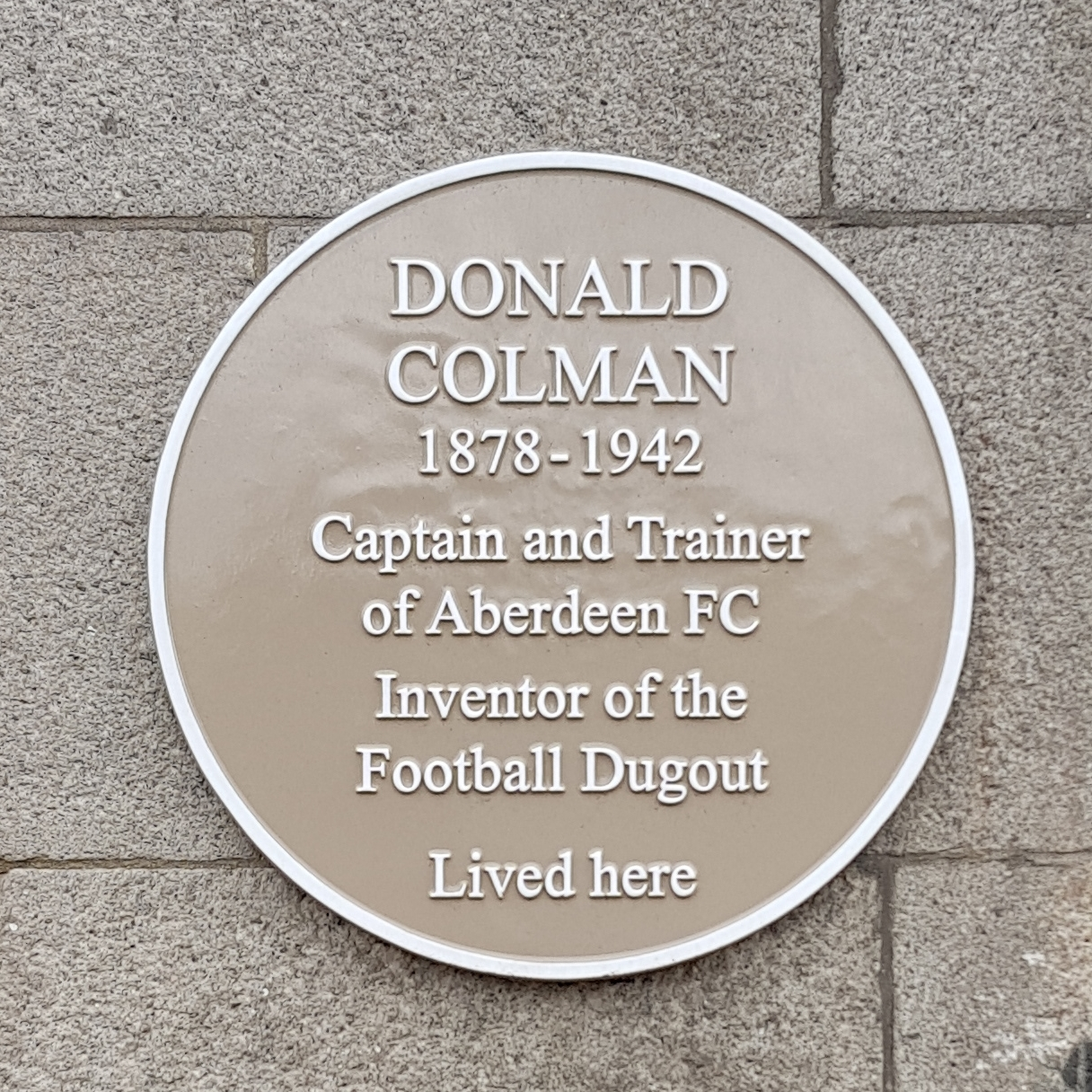
Commemorative plaque to Donald Colman

Travers' trainer (first team coach in modern parlance) was a former player and fans' favourite, Donald Colman. Colman was regarded as a brilliant and innovative thinker about football, and one of his inventions remains a standard part of many football grounds to this day. Colman believed in studying players' feet as they played, and conceived the 'dug-out', a covered area set slightly below the level of the playing surface to better aid his observations. Everton visited Pittodrie soon after its introduction, and exported the idea to the English leagues, from where it spread throughout the football-playing world.

Travers left to become manager of Clyde in 1939, and was replaced by Dave Halliday. Halliday went to his ex club Queen of the South to sign inside forward George Hamilton. This would be as shrewd a signing as Halliday would ever make. However Halliday had barely begun his work when the Second World War halted competitive football in the United Kingdom.

== Wartime (1939–1945) ==
The Second World War effectively shut down senior football, but Aberdeen continued to put on games featuring any players who might be in the forces and stationed nearby. Players such as Stan Mortensen and Ted Ditchburn played for Aberdeen sides in the North-Eastern League and the North-Eastern League Cup although for the last season (1945–46) the Southern League and Southern League Cup were effectively national competitions and Aberdeen competed in those. Unlike in the previous hiatus, the club were kept running, albeit on a highly improvised basis.

== Post-war glory (1946–1970) ==
Halliday inspired Aberdeen (now playing in red shirts) to their first senior silverware in 1946, winning the Scottish League Cup (although this was a reduced wartime version of the competition known officially as the Southern League Cup), and taking his team back to Hampden the following season in the same competition, although they were defeated on this occasion. Aberdeen also reached the Scottish Cup final in that same season, 1946–47, and this time the Cup was won, Hibernian being the defeated finalists.

From these early successes, Halliday built a team capable of challenging for the highest honours in the Scottish game, and reached two more Scottish Cup finals, in 1953 and 1954, although both were lost. Halliday's team were not to be denied, however, and the following season, 1954–55, Aberdeen won their first Scottish League title. Their reward, however, was not to be a place in the first European Cup competition – Scotland's place was awarded to Hibs.

Halliday and Hamilton both left at the end of that championship-winning season. Halliday replaced by Davie Shaw. Aberdeen won another League Cup under his guidance, beating St Mirren in 1955–56, and reached another Scottish Cup final in 1959, but Shaw's reign was ultimately a disappointing one, and he stepped aside for another former favourite player, Tommy Pearson in 1959.

Pearson's time in charge coincided with a high turnover of players, and yielded no trophies. He retired in 1965, making way for Eddie Turnbull, who led Aberdeen to two Cup finals against Celtic, losing in 1967, but gaining revenge in 1970.

=== Washington Whips ===
During the summer of 1967, Aberdeen played a season in North America as part of a fledgling league called the United Soccer Association. This league imported twelve entire clubs from Europe and South America to play in American and Canadian cities, with each club bearing a local name. Aberdeen, playing as the "Washington Whips", won the Eastern Division title, but then lost the championship match to the Western Division winners "Los Angeles Wolves" (Wolverhampton Wanderers of England). (This FIFA-sanctioned league merged the following season with the non-sanctioned National Professional Soccer League, which had also begun in 1967, to form the North American Soccer League.)

== Consistent, yet unsuccessful (1970–1979) ==
The Aberdeen side of the 1970s was one which regularly challenged for honours, but with the exception of the League Cup in 1976, under Ally MacLeod, was not particularly successful. During this decade, Aberdeen had 5 managers, Eddie Turnbull, Jimmy Bonthrone, Ally MacLeod, Billy McNeill and Alex Ferguson. They reached 2 more national cup finals – the Scottish Cup in 1978 under Billy McNeill and the League Cup in the following season under the new manager, the relatively unknown Alex Ferguson.

=== Europe and the penalty shootout ===
Aberdeen first played in Europe in the 1967–68 Cup Winner's Cup, having qualified as runners-up to Celtic in the Scottish Cup final the previous season. Their first tie was a 14–1 aggregate victory over KR Reykjavik, although they lost the second round tie with Standard Liège 3–2 on aggregate. As Scottish Cup holders in 1970–71, Aberdeen once again qualified for the same competition, but this time were eliminated in the first round following a 4–4 aggregate tie with Honvéd. This tie, level after extra time and also level on away goals, was decided by the first ever penalty shootout in UEFA competition history, Honved winning the shootout 5–4 in their own stadium.

Aberdeen were regular participants in UEFA competition in the 1970s, but did not proceed beyond the second round in any competition until the Ferguson years.

== The glory years (1980–1986) ==
Ferguson became manager in 1978, following the departure of McNeill to Celtic, and set about building a team which would win more in the next eight years than in the entire history of the club to that date.

Players such as Jim Leighton, Willie Miller, Alex McLeish and Gordon Strachan developed under Ferguson's guidance to be the backbone of a team with a winning mentality. Aberdeen's second League title was won in 1979–80, and this initial success was built on, with Scottish Cup wins in three successive seasons from 1982 to 1984, two more league titles in 1983–84 and 1984–85, alongside becoming only the third Scottish side to win a European trophy, with the European Cup Winners' Cup victory over Real Madrid on 11 May 1983. The club even released a song, European Song to coincide with the appearance in the Final. This was followed up with the capture of the European Super Cup in December of that year, when Hamburger SV were beaten over two legs. Aberdeen remain the only Scottish club to have won two European trophies. The following season, Aberdeen were beaten semi-finalists in the Cup Winners' Cup, denied the opportunity to defend their trophy by FC Porto.

The success of the Ferguson era may be underlined by the fact that the 1985–86 season was considered by many supporters to be a failure, with only the Scottish Cup and the League Cup won.

== The Ferguson hangover (1986 – 1999) ==
The departure of Ferguson for Manchester United in November 1986 left the Dons board with the arduous task of replacing the irreplaceable, and they opted for little-known coach Ian Porterfield, who had achieved success in England with Sheffield United, but was untested at the top level. Porterfield's reign was not successful and ended with his resignation in May 1988.

Alex Smith and Jocky Scott formed a co-managership of the club to replace Porterfield, and achieved a League Cup and Scottish Cup double in 1989–90. In the 1990–91 season, a run of twelve victories in thirteen games left Aberdeen sitting top of the table on goal difference ahead of Rangers, going into the final match of the season at Ibrox. A change of tactics (which eventually led to Jocky Scott leaving the club) and a Mark Hateley double gave the Championship to Rangers, and allowed them to continue on the Championship run that saw them eventually lift nine consecutive titles.

Alex Smith was not successful as manager in his own right, and was eventually sacked in 1992. Former captain Willie Miller took over and presided over two seasons where Rangers were run close, but chose at the end of the 1993–94 season to break up his team and bring in new players, a move which did not work; Miller was sacked before the end of the season, and the club had to rely on a play-off victory over Dunfermline Athletic to retain their Premier League status.

Miller was replaced by Roy Aitken, but his initial success in avoiding relegation did not last, and despite a League Cup win against Dundee in 1995–96, the club continued to struggle. Alex Miller and Paul Hegarty had spells in charge in the late 1990s, but success remained elusive, and with the financial burden of a new stand putting the club into debt for the first time in its history, the directors turned to Stewart Milne, a local businessman whose firm had built the stand, to bring business acumen to the running of the club.

== 21st century (2000 – date) ==
The Danish-born Ebbe Skovdahl became Aberdeen's first non-Scottish manager in 1999, and his time in charge coincided with some of the heaviest defeats in the club's history, together with the first time the club had ever finished bottom of the league – the ensuing relegation play-off with Falkirk being avoided as Falkirk did not have a ground which met Premier League standards. Skovdahl did, however, lead the club to two cup finals in 2000 and a fourth-place finish in 2002, but left the club partway through the 2002–03 season when he felt he had taken it as far as he could.

Big things were expected from his replacement, Steve Paterson, who was regarded as a promising up-and-coming manager, and he led the club to a decent seventh-place finish that season. However, Paterson's first (and only) full season in charge, 2003–04, proved an absolute disaster as the club were threatened with relegation, only managing to escape due to Partick Thistle being even worse, and Paterson was sacked after a five-game losing streak at the end of the season. Jimmy Calderwood took over as manager in 2004, having been identified as the right man for the job by the newly appointed Director of Football, former player and manager Willie Miller.

Aberdeen under Calderwood posted more consistent results than in previous seasons; fourth in season 2004–05 and 6th in season 2005–06, but the club still did not challenge for major honours in the way they did in the second half of the 20th century. In season 2006–07, despite being knocked out of both cups in the earlier rounds, the club finished in third place in the SPL and qualified for the 2007–08 UEFA Cup with a comfortable 2–0 victory over Rangers at Pittodrie on the last day of the season.

In September 2007, Aberdeen created club history by defeating Dnipro on the away goals rule in the UEFA Cup, the first time the club had won on away goals in 40 years of European football. In the group stage, despite failing to win their first three matches, the combination of other results meant Aberdeen could progress with a home win over Danish champions FC København – they achieved this in style, winning 4–0 (biggest margin of victory since the 80s, before one of Pittodrie's biggest crowds since the 80s) to set up a February 2008 meeting with German giants (and 1983 throwbacks) Bayern Munich.

In May 2009, having secured a 4th-place finish in the Scottish Premier League and a return to European competition, Jimmy Calderwood left his position as manager of Aberdeen by 'mutual consent'.

Calderwood was replaced by former player Mark McGhee. McGhee's time at Aberdeen was not successful. A few weeks after a club record 0–9 defeat to Celtic, McGhee was sacked in December 2010 and replaced by Craig Brown.

Brown was replaced in May 2013 by current manager Derek McInnes and a more successful period ensued, with McInnes' win ratio (55%) second only to Alex Ferguson (58%). Aberdeen won the 2014 Scottish League Cup Final 4–2 on penalties, after a goalless draw, a success that saw them lift their first trophy in 19 years. McInnes led Aberdeen to European qualification for the first time since 2009, achieved through a third-place finish in the league campaign. The club has continued to perform well, and ended the season in second place—their best league position since 1993–94—in 2015, 2016, 2017 and 2018.

== Honours ==
=== League ===
Aberdeen have the distinction of never having been relegated from any division; their only season in a league below the highest in Scotland was their first, 1904–05, at the end of which they were elected, rather than promoted, to the First Division. In 1910–11, Aberdeen finished second behind Rangers in the league, having beaten both halves of the Old Firm during the season, but they did not repeat the feat until 1935–36, and it was more than 50 years after the club had come into existence that the first league title was won, in 1954–55. The following season, Aberdeen finished second behind Rangers, but it was not until the 1970s that they were regularly challenging for the league title. Between 1970 and 1994, Aberdeen finished second on ten occasions, and won the league three times; each of those wins under the managership of Alex Ferguson. In 1983–84, they also won the Scottish Cup (see below), making them the only team outside Glasgow to have won the Scottish Double.

=== Cups ===
Aberdeen's first senior trophy was the Southern League Cup, a precursor to the Scottish League Cup in 1946–47. The Southern League Cup was a restricted, wartime competition, and did not feature all senior Scottish teams at the time, but the official club history records it as the first major honour in the club's history. The following season, Aberdeen reached the final of the League Cup, and won their first Scottish Cup. They had appeared in a Scottish Cup final in 1936–37; a match which attracted 146,433 spectators, the record attendance for a club match in Europe. Aberdeen reached cup finals four times in the 1950s, their only silverware coming when they defeated St Mirren in the 1955–56 League Cup final. Following a final defeat to Celtic in 1966–67, the Scottish Cup was again won in 1969–70.

An extra time League Cup victory over Celtic in 1976–77 and defeats in the Scottish Cup final of 1977–78 and the League Cup final of the following season presaged the 1980s, when Aberdeen won a total of four Scottish Cups – including three in a row between 1982 and 1984 – and two League Cups, the second of which, in 1989, was the third successive final between Aberdeen and Rangers – Aberdeen having lost the first two. This period included the club's first 'double' win in 1983–84, and a double cup win in 1985–86.

Aberdeen won the 1989–90 Scottish Cup final against Celtic on penalties—the first time the competition had been decided in this way. There has been one League Cup win since—against Dundee in 1995–96, and two further appearances in each of the major finals.

Aberdeen have won the Aberdeenshire Cup more times than any other team, although the 39 victories recorded on the club's official website include several won by precursor clubs prior to the official founding in 1903. In addition, the club rarely enters a full–strength team in this competition. The Drybrough Cup was won by Aberdeen twice, in 1971 and 1980; the first and last time the competition was run. Aberdeen also won the Scottish Qualifying Cup in 1904, the only time the club entered.

=== Europe ===
Aberdeen have been regular European competitors since their first appearance in the Cup Winners' Cup in 1967. They qualified for the European Cup three times, reaching the quarter–final in 1985–86; have made 17 appearances in the UEFA Cup, UEFA Europa League and its precursor, the Fairs Cup, twice reaching the third round; and appeared eight times in the Cup Winners Cup, winning the competition in 1982–83 and reaching the semi–final the following season. In 1970–71, Aberdeen became the first team to be eliminated from European competition on penalties, losing a first round Cup Winners' Cup tie against Honvéd. In addition, the club won their only European Super Cup final in 1983; the only Scottish club to have won this competition. Aberdeen were voted 'European Team of the Year' by France Football and Adidas in recognition of their achievements in 1983.

As of 2012, Aberdeen were ranked 143rd in the UEFA Team Rankings; However, by 2019 they had slipped to 192nd, due to several largely unsuccessful European campaigns in the intervening years.

== Sources ==
- Webster, Jack (2003). The First 100 years of The Dons: The official history of Aberdeen Football Club 1903 – 2003. Hodder & Stoughton, London. ISBN 0-340-82344-5.
