= 1943–44 Dundee United F.C. season =

Dundee United
1943–44 season
- Manager: Jimmy Littlejohn
- Stadium: Tannadice Park
- North Eastern League Series 1: 5th W7 D0 L7 F36 A43 P14
- North Eastern League Series 2: 4th W6 D1 L7 F30 A39 P13
- Supplementary Cup: Round 1
- Mitchell Cup: Round 1
- Summer Cup: Round 1

The 1943–44 season was the 37th year of football played by Dundee United, and covers the period from 1 July 1943 to 30 June 1944.

== Match results ==
Dundee United played a total of 38 unofficial matches during the 1944–45 season.

=== Legend ===
Win
Draw
Loss

All results are written with Dundee United's score first. Own goals in italics

=== North Eastern League Series 1 ===
Date	Opponent	Venue	Result	Attendance	Scorers
14 August 1943	Heart of Midlothian "A"	H	6–3	5,000	
21 August 1943	Rangers "A"	A	0–8	3,000	
28 August 1943	Raith Rovers	H	2–1	3,000	
4 September 1943	Dunfermline Athletic	A	0–5	2,000	
11 September 1943	Aberdeen	H	2–0	3,500	
18 September 1943	East Fife	A	1–3	?,???	
25 September 1943	Rangers "A"	H	4–1	6,500	
2 October 1943	Heart of Midlothian "A"	A	2–4	3,000	
9 October 1943	Falkirk "A"	H	7–1	5,000	
16 October 1943	Dunfermline Athletic	H	1–3	5,000	
23 October 1943	Raith Rovers	A	0–3	4,000	
6 November 1943	Aberdeen	A	1–5	?,???	
13 November 1943	Falkirk "A"	A	6–3	3,500	
20 November 1943	East Fife	H	4–3	4,000	

=== North Eastern League Series 2 ===
Date	Opponent	Venue	Result	Attendance	Scorers
1 January 1944	Aberdeen	A	1–1	8,000	
3 January 1944	Raith Rovers	H	3–1	5,000	
8 January 1944	East Fife	A	2–1	1,500	
15 January 1944	Rangers "A"	H	6–2	8,000	
22 January 1944	Heart of Midlothian "A"	A	1–4	2,000	
29 January 1944	Aberdeen	H	1–7	5,000	
5 February 1944	Raith Rovers	A	0–2	2,000	
12 February 1944	Falkirk "A"	A	3–6	3,000	
19 February 1944	East Fife	H	3–1	3,000	
26 February 1944	Heart of Midlothian "A"	H	3–6	3,000	
11 March 1944	Dunfermline Athletic	A	1–2	?,???	
18 March 1944	Dunfermline Athletic	H	2–0	5,000	
25 March 1944	Falkirk "A"	H	3–0	5,000	
27 May 1944	Rangers "A"	A	1–6	2,500	

=== Supplementary Cup ===
Date	Rd	Opponent	Venue	Result	Attendance	Scorers
27 November 1943	R1 L1	Heart of Midlothian "A"	A	2–6	2,000	
4 December 1943	R1 L2	Heart of Midlothian "A"	H	5–4	5,000	

=== Mitchell Cup ===
Date	Rd	Opponent	Venue	Result	Attendance	Scorers
1 April 1944	R1 L1	East Fife	H	2–1	7,000	
8 April 1944	R1 L2	East Fife	A	0–3	3,000	

=== Summer Cup ===
Date	Rd	Opponent	Venue	Result	Attendance	Scorers
3 June 1944	R1 L1	Falkirk "A"	A	0–4	3,000	
10 June 1944	R1 L2	Falkirk "A"	H	0–2	4,000	

== See also ==
- 1943–44 in Scottish football
