= 1943–44 in Scottish football =

Southern League champions
- Rangers

North-Eastern League (Autumn) champions
- Raith Rovers

North-Eastern League (Spring) champions
- Aberdeen

Summer Cup winners
- Motherwell

Southern League Cup winners
- Hibernian

North-Eastern League Cup (Autumn) winners
- Rangers 'A'

North-Eastern League Cup (Spring) winners
- Rangers 'A'

Junior Cup winners
- Irvine Meadow XI

The 1943–44 season was the 71st season of competitive football in Scotland and the fifth season of special wartime football during World War II.

== Overview ==
Between 1939 and 1946 normal competitive football was suspended in Scotland. Many footballers signed up to fight in the war and as a result many teams were depleted, and fielded guest players instead. The Scottish Football League and Scottish Cup were suspended and in their place regional league competitions were set up. Appearances in these tournaments do not count in players' official records.

== Honours ==
League competition was split into two regional leagues, the Southern League and the North-Eastern League. No country-wide cup competition took place, the Glasgow Cup, East of Scotland Shield and Renfrewshire Cup continued and Southern and North-Eastern League Cups were competed for, the Southern League Cup would later form the basis of the League Cup. The Summer Cup was played for by Southern League teams during May and June once league competition had been completed.

Competition	Winner
Southern League	Rangers
North-Eastern League (Autumn)	Raith Rovers
North-Eastern League (Spring)	Aberdeen
Glasgow Cup	Rangers
Renfrewshire Cup	St Mirren
Southern League Cup	Hibernian
Summer Cup	Motherwell
North-Eastern League Cup (Autumn)	Rangers 'A'
North-Eastern League Cup (Spring)	Rangers 'A'
East of Scotland Shield	Hearts

== International ==
Due to the war official international football was suspended and so officially the Scotland team was inactive. However unofficial internationals featuring scratch teams representing Scotland continued. Appearances in these matches are not, however, included in a players total international caps.

Scotland faced England in a wartime international on 16 October 1943 at Maine Road, Manchester in front of 60,000 fans. The Scotland team were crushed 8–0 by a rampant England. The Scotland team that day comprised: Joe Crozier, Jimmy Carabine, Archie Miller, Adam Little, George Young, Billy Campbell, Willie Waddell, Torrance Gillick, Alex Linwood, Tommy Walker, and Johnny Deakin.

The two teams met again on 19 February 1944 at Wembley Stadium in front of a crowd of 80,000. England won again, this time 6–2, with a Jock Dodds double accounting for Scotland's goals. The Scotland team featured: Joe Crozier, Willie Kilmarnock, Jimmy Stephen, Archie Macaulay, Jock Kirton, Matt Busby, Bobby Flavell, Jimmy Stenhouse, Jock Dodds, Jimmy Duncanson and Jimmy Caskie.

They met for a third time at Hampden Park on 22 April where a crowd of 133,000 saw England win 3–2, Dodds and Caskie scoring for Scotland. The line up was: Joe Crozier, Malky McDonald, Jimmy Stephen, Archie Macaulay, Bobby Baxter, Matt Busby, Jimmy Delaney, Tommy Walker, Jock Dodds, Jimmy Duncanson and Jimmy Caskie.

== See also ==
- Association football during World War II
