= 1944–45 in Scottish football =

Southern League champions
- Rangers

North-Eastern League (Autumn) champions
- Dundee

North-Eastern League (Spring) champions
- Aberdeen

Summer Cup winners
- Partick Thistle

Southern League Cup winners
- Rangers

North-Eastern League Cup (Autumn) winners
- Aberdeen

North-Eastern League Cup (Spring) winners
- Aberdeen

Junior Cup winners
- Burnbank Athletic

The 1944–45 season was the 72nd season of competitive football in Scotland and the sixth season of special wartime football during World War II.

== Overview ==
Between 1939 and 1946 normal competitive football was suspended in Scotland. Many footballers signed up to fight in the war and as a result many teams were depleted, and fielded guest players instead. The Scottish Football League and Scottish Cup were suspended and in their place regional league competitions were set up. Appearances in these tournaments do not count in players' official records.

== Honours ==
League competition was split into two regional leagues, the Southern League and the North-Eastern League. No country-wide cup competition took place, the Glasgow Cup, East of Scotland Shield and Renfrewshire Cup continued, the Forfarshire Cup was revived and Southern and North-Eastern League Cups were competed for, the Southern League Cup would later form the basis of the League Cup. The Summer Cup was played for by Southern League teams during May and June once league competition had been completed.

Competition	Winner
Southern League	Rangers
North-Eastern League (Autumn)	Dundee
North-Eastern League (Spring)	Aberdeen
Glasgow Cup	Rangers
Southern League Cup	Rangers
Summer Cup	Partick Thistle
Victory In Europe Cup	Celtic
Renfrewshire Cup	Morton
North-Eastern League Cup (Autumn)	Aberdeen
North-Eastern League Cup (Spring)	Aberdeen
East of Scotland Shield	Hibernian
Forfarshire Cup	Dundee

== International ==
Due to the war official international football was suspended and so officially the Scotland team was inactive. However unofficial internationals featuring scratch teams representing Scotland continued. Appearances in these matches are not, however, included in a players total international caps.

Scotland faced England in a wartime international on 14 October 1944 at Wembley in front of 90,000 fans. The Scotland team lost 6–2 with their goals coming from Tommy Walker and Arthur Milne. The Scotland team that day comprised: David Cumming, Jimmy Stephen, George Cummings, Bob Thyne, Bobby Baxter, Archie Macaulay, Gordon Smith, Tommy Walker, Arthur Milne, Andy Black and Jimmy Caskie.

The two teams met again on 3 February 1945 at Villa Park, Birmingham in front of a crowd of 65,780. England won again, this time 3–2, with Jimmy Delaney and Jock Dodds accounting for Scotland's goals. The Scotland team featured: Bobby Brown, Jim Harley, Jimmy Stephen, Matt Busby, Bob Thyne, Archie Macaulay, Jimmy Delaney, Willie Fagan, Jock Dodds, Andy Black, Billy Liddell.

They met for a third time at Hampden Park on 14 April where a crowd of 133,000 saw England win 6–1. Leslie Johnston scored for Scotland after, unusually at the time, coming on a substitute. The line up was: Bobby Brown, Jim Harley, Jimmy Stephen, Matt Busby, John Harris, Archie Macaulay, Willie Waddell, Tommy Bogan (Leslie Johnston 2'), Tony Harris, Andy Black and John Kelly.

== See also ==
- Association football during World War II
