= 1942–43 Dundee United F.C. season =

Dundee United
1942–43 season
- Manager: Jimmy Littlejohn
- Stadium: Tannadice Park
- North Eastern League Series 1: 6th W5 D0 L9 F24 A36 P10
- North Eastern League Series 2: 6th W5 D1 L8 F25 A32 P11
- Supplementary Cup: Round 1
- Mitchell Cup: Round 1

The 1942–43 season was the 36th year of football played by Dundee United, and covers the period from 1 July 1942 to 30 June 1943.

== Match results ==
Dundee United played a total of 32 unofficial matches during the 1942–43 season.

=== Legend ===
Win
Draw
Loss

All results are written with Dundee United's score first. Own goals in italics

=== North Eastern League Series 1 ===
Date	Opponent	Venue	Result	Attendance	Scorers
8 August 1942	Rangers "A"	A	1–2	2,500	
15 August 1942	Raith Rovers	H	3–2	2,000	
22 August 1943	Heart of Midlothian "A"	A	1–3	2,500	
29 August 1942	Dunfermline Athletic	H	3–1	3,000	
5 September 1942	East Fife	A	0–3	4,000	
12 September 1942	Aberdeen	H	0–4	6,000	
19 September 1942	Hibernian "A"	H	3–1	3,500	
26 September 1942	Heart of Midlothian "A"	H	3–1	?,???	
3 October 1942	Raith Rovers	A	0–4	2,000	
10 October 1942	Rangers "A"	H	3–2	?,???	
17 October 1942	East Fife	H	0–1	1,500	
24 October 1942	Aberdeen	A	0–1	7,000	
31 October 1942	Hibernian "A"	A	4–6	500	
7 November 1942	Dunfermline Athletic	A	3–5	2,000	

=== North Eastern League Series 2 ===
Date	Opponent	Venue	Result	Attendance	Scorers
1 January 1943	Aberdeen	H	1–0	?,???	
2 January 1943	East Fife	H	1–2	4,500	
16 January 1943	Heart of Midlothian "A"	A	2–2	2,000	
23 January 1943	Raith Rovers	A	6–2	8,000	
30 January 1943	Hibernian "A"	A	2–3	750	
6 February 1943	Rangers "A"	H	2–1	4,000	
13 February 1943	Aberdeen	A	0–3	6,000	
20 February 1943	Heart of Midlothian "A"	H	4–1	1,000	
27 February 1943	Raith Rovers	H	3–4	4,000	
6 March 1943	Hibernian "A"	H	2–0	2,000	
13 March 1943	Rangers "A"	A	1–3	4,000	
20 March 1943	Dunfermline Athletic	H	4–2	1,500	
27 March 1943	Raith Rovers	H	3–4	4,000	
17 April 1943	Dunfermline Athletic	A	1–3	1,000	

=== Supplementary Cup ===
Date	Rd	Opponent	Venue	Result	Attendance	Scorers
21 November 1942	R1 L1	Rangers "A"	H	0–0	7,000	
28 November 1942	R1 L2	Rangers "A"	A	1–2	8,000	

=== Mitchell Cup ===
Date	Rd	Opponent	Venue	Result	Attendance	Scorers
3 April 1943	R1 L1	Raith Rovers	A	2–1	3,500	
10 April 1943	R1 L2	Raith Rovers	H	0–3	?,???	

== See also ==
- 1942–43 in Scottish football
