= Alec Linwood =

Scottish footballer

Personal information
- Full name: Alexander Bryce Linwood
- Date of birth: 13 March 1920
- Place of birth: Drongan, Scotland
- Date of death: 26 October 2003 (aged 83)
- Place of death: Renfrew, Scotland
- Position: Centre forward

Senior career*
Years	Team	Apps	(Gls)
1938	Muirkirk		
1938–1946	St Mirren	4	(0)
1940	→ Partick Thistle (loan)	0	(0)
1946–1947	Middlesbrough	14	(3)
1947–1948	Hibernian	36	(23)
1948–1951	Clyde	56	(20)
1951–1955	Greenock Morton	101	(72)

International career
1943	Scotland (wartime)	1	(0)
1948	Scottish League XI	1	(0)
1949	Scotland	1	(1)
- * Club domestic league appearances and goals

Alexander Bryce Linwood (13 March 1920 – 26 October 2003) was a Scottish footballer who played for St Mirren, Middlesbrough, Hibernian, Clyde, Greenock Morton and the Scotland national team.

== Career ==
Born in the tiny mining settlement of Drumsmudden, near Drongan in Ayrshire, Linwood began working in the mines at the age of 14. He played schools and juvenile football before joining the newly formed Muirkirk Juniors in 1938. Linwood signed for St Mirren the same year, however on the outbreak of World War II, the player was forced to resume his mining career for the war effort.

A centre-forward, Linwood continued to play wartime football for St. Mirren and also played in an unofficial international match against England at Maine Road in 1943 which the Scots lost 8–0. In all, Linwood scored 165 goals in 236 competitive matches for St Mirren between 1938–1946 and remains the club's second top goalscorer of all time. He finished as the team's top scorer in all seven seasons with the club.

After Motherwell had a bid rejected in November 1945, Linwood moved to Middlesbrough in 1946 but struggled to make an impact in the English First Division, partly due to still having to work as a miner while his teammates were full-time professionals. The player returned to Hibernian and won the Scottish Football League championship in 1948, his only senior footballing honour.

Later in 1948, Linwood represented the Scottish League XI. In November 1949, now as a Clyde player, Linwood scored in his only cap for Scotland, a 2–0 win over Wales in a British Home Championship match which doubled as a 1950 World Cup qualifier.

While at Shawfield, Linwood played in 1949 Scottish Cup final and scored 30 goals the season after. He was the first post-war Clyde player to net five goals in a match.

He later moved to Morton in 1951 before retiring in 1955. Linwood died on 23 October 2003 at the age of 83.

== Honours ==
St Mirren

- Summer Cup: 1942–43
- Renfrewshire Cup: 1945–46

Hibernian

- Scottish Division A: 1947–48

Clyde

- Scottish Cup: Runner-up 1948–49

Morton

- Renfrewshire Cup: 1951–52

== Career statistics ==
Appearances and goals by club, season and competition
Club	Season	Division	League		FA Cup		League Cup		Other		Total	
Club	Season	Division	Apps	Goals	Apps	Goals	Apps	Goals	Apps	Goals	Apps	Goals
Partick Thistle	1939–40	Emergency League West	1	0	–	–	–	–	1 (Note: Includes Glasgow Charity Cup (1 app))	0	2	0
Partick Thistle	Total		1	0	0	0	0	1	1	0	2	0
St Mirren	1945–46	Southern League A	28	16	2 (Note: SFA held Victory Cup instead of Scottish Cup)	1	6	1	1 (Note: Includes Renfrewshire Cup (1 app, 2 goals))	2	37	20
St Mirren	Total		28	16	2	1	6	1	1	2	37	20
Hibernian	1947–48	Scottish A Division	24	14	5	4	4	3	0	0	33	21
Hibernian	1948–49	Scottish A Division	12	8	0	0	6	4	0	0	18	12
Hibernian	Total		36	22	5	4	10	7	0	0	51	33
Clyde	1948–49	Scottish A Division	14	6	7	6	0	0	1 (Note: Includes Glasgow Cup (1 app))	0	22	12
Clyde	1949–50	Scottish A Division	28	12	2	2	6	3	7 (Note: Includes Glasgow Cup (6 apps, 9 goals) and Charity Cup (1 app))	9	43	26
Clyde	1950–51	Scottish A Division	11	1	3	3	6	1	4 (Note: Includes Glasgow Cup (1 apps), Glasgow Charity Cup (1 app) and St Mungo Cup (2 apps, 2 goals))	2	24	7
Clyde	Total		53	19	12	11	12	4	12	11	89	45
Total			118	57	19	16	28	12	14	11	179	98
