= 1944–45 Dundee United F.C. season =

Dundee United
1944–45 season
- Manager: Jimmy Littlejohn (to November); Charlie McGillivray (from November)
- Stadium: Tannadice Park
- North Eastern League Series 1: 7th W5 D3 L10 F34 A49 P13
- North Eastern League Series 2: 6th W7 D2 L9 F31 A54 P16
- Mitchell Cup: Round 1

The 1944–45 season was the 38th year of football played by Dundee United, and covers the period from 1 July 1944 to 30 June 1945.

== Match results ==
Dundee United played a total of 38 unofficial matches during the 1944–45 season.

=== Legend ===
Win
Draw
Loss

All results are written with Dundee United's score first. Own goals in italics

=== North Eastern League Series 1 ===
| Date | Opponent | Venue | Result | Attendance | Scorers |
|---|---|---|---|---|---|
| 12 August 1944 | East Fife | H | 2–1 | 8,000 | |
| 19 August 1944 | Arbroath | A | 1–2 | 3,000 | |
| 26 August 1944 | Dundee | H | 1–2 | 15,500 | |
| 2 September 1944 | Dunfermline Athletic | A | 2–2 | 4,000 | |
| 9 September 1944 | Falkirk "A" | H | 1–2 | 8,000 | |
| 16 September 1944 | Rangers "A" | H | 3–0 | 10,000 | |
| 23 September 1944 | Heart of Midlothian "A" | A | 0–3 | 2,000 | |
| 30 September 1944 | Aberdeen | A | 1–5 | 7,000 | |
| 7 October 1944 | Raith Rovers | H | 5–1 | 9,000 | |
| 14 October 1944 | East Fife | A | 5–2 | 2,500 | |
| 21 October 1944 | Falkirk "A" | A | 2–4 | 3,500 | |
| 28 October 1944 | Heart of Midlothian "A" | H | 4–3 | 9,000 | |
| 4 November 1944 | Dundee | A | 2–2 | 10,800 | |
| 11 November 1944 | Aberdeen | H | 0–5 | 12,000 | |
| 18 November 1944 | Arbroath | H | 2–5 | 9,000 | |
| 25 November 1944 | Raith Rovers | A | 1–1 | 4,000 | |
| 2 December 1944 | Dunfermline Athletic | H | 2–7 | 5,000 | |
| 16 December 1944 | Rangers "A" | A | 0–2 | 1,000 | |

=== North Eastern League Series 2 ===
| Date | Opponent | Venue | Result | Attendance | Scorers |
|---|---|---|---|---|---|
| 1 January 1945 | Arbroath | H | 1–0 | 8,000 | |
| 2 January 1945 | Dundee | A | 1–4 | 10,600 | |
| 6 January 1945 | Rangers "A" | A | 1–5 | 1,500 | |
| 13 January 1945 | Raith Rovers | H | 5–2 | 7,000 | |
| 10 February 1945 | Aberdeen | H | 1–9 | 6,000 | |
| 17 February 1945 | Dunfermline Athletic | H | 6–3 | 5,100 | |
| 24 February 1945 | Raith Rovers | A | 2–5 | 1,000 | |
| 3 March 1945 | Dundee | H | 0–4 | 11,000 | |
| 10 March 1945 | Heart of Midlothian | A | 3–0 | ?,??? | |
| 17 March 1945 | East Fife | H | 3–1 | 7,500 | |
| 24 March 1945 | Rangers "A" | H | 1–1 | 11,500 | |
| 31 March 1945 | Dunfermline Athletic | A | 1–3 | 2,000 | |
| 7 April 1945 | Arbroath | A | 2–0 | 2,400 | |
| 14 April 1945 | Falkirk "A" | H | 2–5 | ?,??? | |
| 28 April 1945 | Heart of Midlothian "A" | H | 0–0 | ?,??? | |
| 5 May 1945 | Aberdeen | A | 0–6 | 5,000 | |
| 12 May 1945 | East Fife | A | 1–6 | 3,000 | |
| 2 June 1945 | Falkirk "A" | H | 1–0 | 6,000 | |

=== Mitchell Cup ===
| Date | Rd | Opponent | Venue | Result | Attendance | Scorers |
|---|---|---|---|---|---|---|
| 19 May 1945 | R1 L1 | Falkirk "A" | H | 3–2 | 7,000 | |
| 26 May 1945 | R1 L2 | Falkirk "A" | A | 1–3 | 3,000 | |

== See also ==
- 1944–45 in Scottish football
