= 1941–42 Dundee United F.C. season =

Dundee United
1941–42 season
- Manager: Jimmy Allan
- Stadium: Tannadice Park
- North Eastern League Series 1: 6th W3 D4 L7 F32 A45 P10
- North Eastern League Series 2: 4th W7 D3 L4 F37 A25 P107
- Supplementary Cup: Finalists
- Mitchell Cup: Finalists

The 1941–42 season was the 35th year of football played by Dundee United, and covers the period from 1 July 1941 to 30 June 1942.

== Match results ==
Dundee United played a total of 38 unofficial matches during the 1941–42 season.

=== Legend ===
Win
Draw
Loss

All results are written with Dundee United's score first. Own goals in italics

=== North Eastern League Series 1 ===
Date	Opponent	Venue	Result	Attendance	Scorers
9 August 1941	East Fife	H	1–1	4,000	
16 August 1941	St Bernard's	A	4–1	600	
23 August 1941	Aberdeen	H	5–0	6,500	
30 August 1941	Rangers "A"	A	3–5	5,000	
6 September 1941	Leith Athletic	H	1–4	3,000	
13 September 1941	Raith Rovers	A	1–2	1,500	
20 September 1941	Dunfermline Athletic	H	1–1	2,000	
27 September 1941	East Fife	A	2–2	3,000	
4 October 1941	Leith Athletic	A	5–2	1,200	
11 October 1941	St Bernard's	H	2–2	3,000	
18 October 1941	Rangers "A"	H	0–5	7,000	
25 October 1941	Dunfermline Athletic	A	2–7	1,500	
1 November 1941	Aberdeen	A	2–4	4,000	
8 November 1941	Raith Rovers	H	3–9	?,???	

=== North Eastern League Series 2 ===
Date	Opponent	Venue	Result	Attendance	Scorers
1 January 1942	Dunfermline Athletic	H	3–5	1,500	
3 January 1942	East Fife	A	1–1	1,500	
10 January 1942	Aberdeen	H	2–0	3,000	
17 January 1942	Leith Athletic	A	2–2	400	
21 February 1942	Dunfermline Athletic	A	2–0	500	
14 March 1942	St Bernards	A	3–1	300	
21 March 1942	Rangers "A"	A	2–4	2,000	
28 March 1942	Raith Rovers	H	5–1	1,000	
4 April 1942	St Bernard's	H	2–0	1,000	
11 April 1942	Raith Rovers	A	1–1	1,000	
18 April 1942	Rangers "A"	H	8–1	8,000	
25 April 1942	East Fife	H	0–2	4,500	
30 May 1942	Leith Athletic	H	5–1	1,000	
6 June 1942	Aberdeen	A	1–6	10,000	

=== Supplementary Cup ===
Date	Rd	Opponent	Venue	Result	Attendance	Scorers
15 November 1941	R1 L1	St Bernard's	H	7–1	2,000	
22 November 1941	R1 L2	St Bernard's	A	3–3	800	
29 November 1941	SF L1	East Fife	H	3–2	5,500	
6 December 1941	SF L2	East Fife	A	1–1	4,700	
13 December 1941	F L1	Aberdeen	H	4–1	8,000	
20 December 1941	F L2	Aberdeen	A	2–6	10,000	

=== Mitchell Cup ===
Date	Rd	Opponent	Venue	Result	Attendance	Scorers
2 May 1942	R1 L1	Rangers "A"	H	2–1	8,000	
9 May 1942	R1 L2	Rangers "A"	A	2–2	5,000	
16 May 1942	F L1	Aberdeen	A	4–3	8,000	
23 May 1942	F L2	Aberdeen	H	1–3	10,000	

== See also ==
- 1941–42 in Scottish football
