= Jimmy McGowan (footballer, born 1916) =

Scottish footballer

Personal information
- Full name: James McGowan
- Date of birth: 10 June 1916
- Place of birth: Airdrie, Scotland
- Date of death: 24 July 1989 (aged 72–73)
- Place of death: Airdrie, Scotland
- Height: 5 ft 8 in (1.73 m)
- Position: Right back

Senior career*
Years	Team	Apps	(Gls)
- Maryhill
1941–1956	Partick Thistle	243	(1)

International career
1946	Scotland	1	(0)
1946	Scotland (wartime)	1	(0)
- * Club domestic league appearances and goals

James McGowan (10 June 1916 – 24 July 1989) was a Scottish footballer who played as a right back.

== Career ==
McGowan played club football for Maryhill (Junior level) and Partick Thistle. He made a total of 543 appearances for Partick Thistle, including 243 in the Scottish Football League.

He made one official appearance for Scotland, a 2–2 draw with Belgium in January 1946. McGowan also played in a Victory International against Ireland in February 1946, which is not considered to be an official international, instead falling under the wartime fixtures.

His younger brother Ally McGowan was also a footballer, who played mainly for Wrexham.

== Honours ==
Club

- Scottish League Cup: Runners up 1953–54
- Glasgow Cup: 1950–51, 1952–53
- Glasgow Charity Cup: 1948–49
- Summer Cup: 1944–45

== See also ==
- List of one-club men in association football
