= 1944–45 Heart of Midlothian F.C. season =

Heart of Midlothian
1944–45 season
- Manager: David McLean
- Stadium: Tynecastle Park
- Southern League: 6th
- Summer Cup: Round 2
- Southern League Cup: Group Stage

During the 1944–45 season Hearts competed in the Southern League, the Summer Cup, the Southern League Cup and the East of Scotland Shield.

== Fixtures ==
=== Rosebery Charity Cup ===
9 May 1945 Final	Hibernian	2–2 (Hibs win 7-6 on corner kicks)	Hearts	Easter Road
	Goal

=== East of Scotland Shield ===
16 April 1945 Final	Hibernian	3–1	Hearts	Easter Road

=== Wilson Cup ===
18 September 1944 Final	Hearts	2–6	Hibernian	Tynecastle Park

=== Southern League Cup ===
24 February 1945 Southern League Cup Group	Hearts	2–0	St Mirren	Tynecastle Park

3 March 1945 Southern League Cup Group	Dumbarton	0–0	Hearts	Boghead Park

10 March 1945 Southern League Cup Group	Motherwell	1–1	Hearts	Fir Park

17 March 1945 Southern League Cup Group	St Mirren	0–1	Hearts	Tynecastle Park

24 March 1945 Southern League Cup Group	Hearts	6–2	Dumbarton	Tynecastle Park

31 March 1945 Southern League Cup Group	Hearts	2–4	Motherwell	Tynecastle Park

=== Summer Cup ===
26 May 1945 Summer Cup R1 1st Leg	Hearts	3–0	Airdrieonians	Tynecastle Park

2 June 1945 Summer Cup R1 2nd Leg	Airdrieonians	0–2	Hearts	Broomfield Park

9 June 1945 Summer Cup R2 1st Leg	Partick Thistle	3–0	Hearts	Firhill Park

16 June 1945 Summer Cup R2 2nd Leg	Hearts	2–1	Partick Thistle	Tynecastle Park

=== Southern League ===
12 August 1944 Southern League	Celtic	4–1	Hearts	Celtic Park

19 August 1944 Southern League	Hearts	3–2	Airdrieonians	Tynecastle Park
				Attendance: 9,000

26 August 1944 Southern League	Motherwell	4–1	Hearts	Fir Park

2 September 1944 Southern League	Hearts	7–0	St Mirren	Tynecastle Park
				Attendance: 7,331

9 September 1944 Southern League	Hibernian	3–1	Hearts	Easter Road
				Attendance: 20,000

16 September 1944 Southern League	Hearts	4–1	Third Lanark	Tynecastle Park

23 September 1944 Southern League	Partick Thistle	2–1	Hearts	Firhill Park
				Attendance: 6,000

30 September 1944 Southern League	Hearts	1–2	Falkirk	Tynecastle Park

7 October 1944 Southern League	Hearts	2–1	Morton	Tynecastle Park
				Attendance: 12,000

14 October 1944 Southern League	Hearts	4–0	Dumbarton	Tynecastle Park
				Attendance: 4,500

21 October 1944 Southern League	Queen's Park	1–1	Hearts	Hampden Park
				Attendance: 6,000

28 October 1944 Southern League	Hearts	1–1	Rangers	Tynecastle Park
				Attendance: 20,000

4 November 1944 Southern League	Clyde	5–1	Hearts	Shawfield Stadium
				Attendance: 7,000

11 November 1944 Southern League	Albion Rovers	3–1	Hearts	Cliftonhill

18 November 1944 Southern League	Hamilton Academical	2–2	Hearts	Douglas Park

25 November 1944 Southern League	Hearts	2–0	Celtic	Tynecastle Park
				Attendance: 12,000

2 December 1944 Southern League	Airdrieonians	1–1	Hearts	Broomfield Park

9 December 1944 Southern League	Hearts	3–3	Motherwell	Tynecastle Park
				Attendance: 20,000

16 December 1944 Southern League	St Mirren	1–2	Hearts	St Mirren Park, Love Street

23 December 1944 Southern League	Hearts	3–3	Partick Thistle	Tynecastle Park

30 December 1944 Southern League	Third Lanark	1–2	Hearts	Cathkin Park

1 January 1945 Southern League	Hearts	3–0	Hibernian	Tynecastle Park
				Attendance: 23,507

2 January 1945 Southern League	Hearts	4–2	Hamilton Academical	Tynecastle Park
				Attendance: 12,000

6 January 1945 Southern League	Falkirk	2–2	Hearts	Brockville Park
				Attendance: 10,000

13 January 1945 Southern League	Morton	5–1	Hearts	Cappielow Park
				Attendance: 8,000

3 February 1945 Southern League	Rangers	4–0	Hearts	Ibrox Park
				Attendance: 15,000

10 February 1945 Southern League	Hearts	6–2	Clyde	Tynecastle Park

17 February 1945 Southern League	Hearts	2–1	Albion Rovers	Tynecastle Park

7 April 1945 Southern League	Hearts	2–1	Queen's Park	Tynecastle Park
				Attendance: 10,000

21 April 1945 Southern League	Dumbarton	3–2	Hearts	Boghead Park

== See also ==
- List of Heart of Midlothian F.C. seasons
