= 1941–42 in Scottish football =

Southern League champions
- Rangers

North-Eastern League (Autumn) champions
- Rangers 'A'

North-Eastern League (Spring) champions
- Aberdeen

Summer Cup winners
- Rangers

Southern league Cup winners
- Rangers

North-Eastern League Cup (Autumn) champions
- Aberdeen

North-Eastern League Cup (Spring) champions
- Dundee United

Junior Cup winners
- Clydebank Juniors

The 1941–42 season was the 69th season of competitive football in Scotland and third season of special wartime football during World War II.

== Overview ==
Between 1939 and 1946 normal competitive football was suspended in Scotland. Many footballers signed up to fight in the war and as a result many teams were depleted, and fielded guest players instead. The Scottish Football League and Scottish Cup were suspended and in their place regional league competitions were set up. Appearances in these tournaments do not count in players' official records.

== Honours ==
League competition was split into two regional leagues, the Southern League and the North-Eastern League. No country-wide cup competition took place, the Glasgow Cup continued, as did the East of Scotland Shield and the Renfrewshire Cup, and Southern and North-Eastern League Cups were competed for, the Southern League Cup would later form the basis of the League Cup. The Summer Cup was played for by Southern League teams during May and June once league competition had been completed.

Competition	Winner
Southern League	Rangers
North-Eastern League (Autumn)	Rangers 'A'
North-Eastern League (Spring)	Aberdeen
Glasgow Cup	Rangers
East of Scotland Shield	Hearts
Renfrewshire Cup	Morton
Southern League Cup	Rangers
Summer Cup	Rangers
North-Eastern League Cup (Autumn)	Aberdeen
North-Eastern League Cup (Spring)	Dundee United

== International ==
Due to the war official international football was suspended and so officially the Scotland team was inactive. However unofficial internationals featuring scratch teams representing Scotland continued. Appearances in these matches are not, however, included in a players total international caps.

Scotland faced England in a wartime international on 4 October 1941 at Wembley Stadium in front of 65,000 fans. England won 2–0. The Scotland team that day comprised: Jerry Dawson, Jimmy Carabine, Andy Beattie, Bill Shankly, Jimmy Dykes, Malky McDonald, Jimmy Caskie, Tommy Walker, Jimmy Smith, Dougie Wallace and Stan Williams.

The two teams met again at Wembley on 17 January 1942 in front of a crowd of 64,000. This time Scotland suffered a 3–0 defeat. The Scotland team that day comprised: Jerry Dawson, Jimmy Carabine, Andy Beattie, Bill Shankly, Jimmy Dykes, Matt Busby, Jimmy Caskie, Tommy Walker, Torrance Gillick, Andy Black and Charlie Johnston.

On 18 April a third game between the two sides took place at Hampden Park, Glasgow in front of 91,000 supporters. This time Scotland won 5–4, with their goals coming from a Jock Dodds hat-trick and one each from Bill Shankly and Billy Liddell. The line up was: Jerry Dawson, Jimmy Carabine, Andy Beattie, Bill Shankly, Tom Smith, Matt Busby, Willie Waddell, Alec Herd, Jock Dodds, Gordon Bremner and Billy Liddell.

== See also ==
- Association football during World War II
