= 1942–43 in Scottish football =

Southern League champions
- Rangers

North-Eastern League (Autumn) champions
- Aberdeen

North-Eastern League (Spring) champions
- Aberdeen

Summer Cup winners
- St Mirren

Southern League Cup winners
- Rangers

North-Eastern League Cup (Autumn) winners
- Aberdeen

North-Eastern League Cup (Spring) winners
- Aberdeen

Junior Cup winners
- Kirkintilloch Rob Roy

The 1942–43 season was the 70th season of competitive football in Scotland and the fourth season of special wartime football during World War II.

== Overview ==
Between 1939 and 1946 normal competitive football was suspended in Scotland. Many footballers signed up to fight in the war and as a result many teams were depleted, and fielded guest players instead. The Scottish Football League and Scottish Cup were suspended and in their place regional league competitions were set up. Appearances in these tournaments do not count in players' official records.

== Honours ==
League competition was split into two regional leagues, the Southern League and the North-Eastern League. No country-wide cup competition took place, the Glasgow Cup, East of Scotland Shield and Renfrewshire Cup continued, and Southern and North-Eastern League Cups were competed for, the Southern League Cup would later form the basis of the League Cup. The Summer Cup was played for by Southern League teams during May and June once league competition had been completed.

Competition	Winner
Southern League	Rangers
North-Eastern League (Autumn)	Aberdeen
North-Eastern League (Spring)	Aberdeen
Glasgow Cup	Rangers
Renfrewshire Cup	Morton
Southern League Cup	Rangers
Summer Cup	St Mirren
North-Eastern League Cup (Autumn)	Aberdeen
North-Eastern League Cup (Spring)	Dundee United
East of Scotland Shield	Hibernian

== International ==
Due to the war official international football was suspended and so officially the Scotland team was inactive. However unofficial internationals featuring scratch teams representing Scotland continued. Appearances in these matches are not, however, included in a players total international caps.

Scotland faced England in a wartime international on 10 October 1942 at Wembley Stadium in front of 75,000 fans. The game ended 0–0. The Scotland team that day comprised: Jerry Dawson, Jimmy Carabine, Andy Beattie, Bill Shankly, Willie Corbett, Matt Busby, Willie Waddell, Tommy Walker, Jock Dodds, Gordon Bremner and Billy Liddell

The two teams met again at Hampden Park, Glasgow on 17 April 1943 in front of a crowd of 105,000. This time Scotland suffered a 4–0 defeat. The Scotland team that day comprised: Jerry Dawson, Jimmy Carabine, Jock Shaw, Bill Shankly, George Young, Sammy Kean, Willie Waddell, Willie Buchan, Dougie Wallace, Alex Venters and Billy Liddell.

== See also ==
- Association football during World War II
