= 1945–46 Dundee United F.C. season =

Dundee United
1945–46 season
- Chairman: J. Johnston-Grant
- Manager: Charlie McGillivray (to October); Willie MacFadyen (from October)
- Stadium: Tannadice Park
- Southern League B Division: 12th W13 D5 L20 F69 A108 P15
- Victory Cup: Round 1
- Southern League Cup: Quarter-final
- Supplementary Cup: Semi-final
Home colours

The 1945–46 season was the 39th year of football played by Dundee United, and covers the period from 1 July 1945 to 30 June 1946. United finished in twelfth place in the Southern League Second Division.

== Match results ==
Dundee United played a total of 37 competitive matches during the 1945–46 season.

=== Legend ===
Win
Draw
Loss

All results are written with Dundee United's score first. Own goals in italics

=== Division B ===
Date	Opponent	Venue	Result	Attendance	Scorers
11 August 1945	Dunfermline Athletic	A	0–7	4,000	
18 August 1945	St Johnstone	H	3–4	7,000	
25 August 1946	Albion Rovers	A	0–1	2,000	
1 September 1945	Ayr United	H	3–2	5,000	
8 September 1945	Dundee	A	0–1	12,341	
15 September 1945	Raith Rovers	H	0–7	5,500	
22 September 1945	Alloa Athletic	H	2–5	3,000	
29 September 1945	Airdrieonians	H	4–2	5,500	
6 October 1945	Cowdenbeath	A	2–4	5,000	
13 October 1945	Arbroath	A	1–4	3,300	
20 October 1945	Stenhousemuir	H	7–0	4,500	
27 October 1945	East Fife	H	5–2	8,500	
3 November 1945	Dumbarton	A	1–2	????	
10 November 1945	St Johnstone	A	0–3	4,500	
17 November 1945	Dunfermline Athletic	H	1–2	6,500	
24 November 1945	Albion Rovers	H	2–3	7,500	
1 December 1945	Ayr United	A	1–1	4,000	
8 December 1945	Alloa Athletic	A	1–3	3,500	
15 December 1945	Raith Rovers	A	0–5	2,000	
22 December 1945	Airdrieonians	A	1–1	3,000	
29 December 1945	Cowdenbeath	H	0–2	6,100	
1 January 1946	Dundee	H	2–3	16,500	
2 January 1946	Dumbarton	H	4–1	6,500	
5 January 1946	Arbroath	H	4–1	7,500	
12 January 1946	Stenhousemuir	A	2–2	1,000	
19 January 1946	East Fife	A	0–2	3,000	

=== Victory Cup ===
Date	Rd	Opponent	Venue	Result	Attendance	Scorers
20 April 1946	R1 L1	Queen of the South	H	2–1	15,000	
27 April 1946	R1 L2	Queen of the South	A	1–3	7,500	

=== Southern League Cup ===
Date	Rd	Opponent	Venue	Result	Attendance	Scorers
23 February 1946	G7	Stenhousemuir	H	4–0		
2 March 1946	G7	Ayr United	A	0–2		
9 March 1946	G7	Dumbarton	H	3–2		
16 March 1946	G7	Stenhousemuir	A	1–1		
23 March 1946	G7	Ayr United	H	2–1		
30 March 1946	G7	Dumbarton	A	2–1		

=== Supplementary Cup ===
Date	Rd	Opponent	Venue	Result	Attendance	Scorers
26 January 1946	R1 L1	Raith Rovers	H	1–4	9,000	
2 February 1946	R1 L2	Raith Rovers	A	3–0	3,000	
6 February 1946	R1 R	Raith Rovers	N	3–3 (Raith won after coin toss after 4–4 in corners)	9,745	

== See also ==
- 1945–46 in Scottish football
