= 1943–44 Heart of Midlothian F.C. season =

Heart of Midlothian
1943–44 season
- Manager: David McLean
- Stadium: Tynecastle Park
- Southern League: 4th
- Summer Cup: Round 2
- Southern League Cup: Group Stage

During the 1943–44 season Hearts competed in the Southern League, the Summer Cup, the Southern League Cup and the East of Scotland Shield.

== Fixtures ==
=== Friendlies ===
7 August 1943 Friendly	Hearts	3–2	Royal Air Force	Tynecastle Park

=== Rosebery Charity Cup ===
27 May 1944 Final	Hearts	1–4	Hibernian	Tynecastle Park
	Goal

=== East of Scotland Shield ===
13 May 1944 Final	Hearts	2–1	Hibernian	Tynecastle Park

=== Wilson Cup ===
20 September 1943 Final	Hearts	2–1	Hibernian	Tynecastle Park

=== Southern League Cup ===
4 March 1944 Southern League Cup Group	Hearts	2–4	Rangers	Tynecastle Park

11 March 1944 Southern League Cup Group	Airdrieonians	2–3	Hearts	Broomfield Park

18 March 1944 Southern League Cup Group	Hearts	4–0	Motherwell	Tynecastle Park

25 March 1944 Southern League Cup Group	Rangers	2–0	Hearts	Ibrox Park

8 April 1944 Southern League Cup Group	Motherwell	3–1	Hearts	Fir Park

15 April 1944 Southern League Cup Group	Hearts	3–0	Airdrieonians	Tynecastle Park

=== Summer Cup ===
3 June 1944 Summer Cup R1 1st Leg	Hearts	5–1	Albion Rovers	Tynecastle Park

10 June 1944 Summer Cup R1 2nd Leg	Albion Rovers	2–3	Hearts	Cliftonhill

17 June 1944 Summer Cup R2 1st Leg	Hearts	1–4	Falkirk	Tynecastle Park

24 June 1944 Summer Cup R2 2nd Leg	Falkirk	2–0	Hearts	Tynecastle Park

=== Southern League ===
14 August 1943 Southern League	Hearts	2–3	Partick Thistle	Tynecastle Park
				Attendance: 10,000

21 August 1943 Southern League	Falkirk	2–3	Hearts	Brockville Park

28 August 1943 Southern League	Hearts	3–1	Motherwell	Tynecastle Park
				Attendance: 7,000

4 September 1943 Southern League	Third Lanark	1–2	Hearts	Cathkin Park
				Attendance: 3,000

11 September 1943 Southern League	Hearts	0–1	Hibernian	Tynecastle Park
				Attendance: 22,000

18 September 1943 Southern League	St Mirren	5–3	Hearts	St Mirren Park, Love Street
				Attendance: 8,000

25 September 1943 Southern League	Hearts	0–0	Celtic	Tynecastle Park

2 October 1943 Southern League	Airdrieonians	1–3	Hearts	Tynecastle Park
				Attendance: 3,000

9 October 1943 Southern League	Hearts	1–1	Morton	Tynecastle Park
				Attendance: 9,000

16 October 1943 Southern League	Rangers	1–3	Hearts	Ibrox Park
				Attendance: 15,000

23 October 1943 Southern League	Hearts	9–0	Queen's Park	Tynecastle Park
				Attendance: 6,082

30 October 1943 Southern League	Clyde	2–0	Hearts	Shawfield Stadium
				Attendance: 9,000

6 November 1943 Southern League	Hearts	3–0	Dumbarton	Tynecastle Park
				Attendance: 11,000

13 November 1943 Southern League	Albion Rovers	1–2	Hearts	Cliftonhill
				Attendance: 3,000

20 November 1943 Southern League	Hearts	5–6	Hamilton Academical	Tynecastle Park
				Attendance: 9,000

27 November 1943 Southern League	Partick Thistle	0–1	Hearts	Firhill Park

4 December 1943 Southern League	Hearts	1–1	Falkirk	Tynecastle Park

11 December 1943 Southern League	Motherwell	2–2	Hearts	Fir Park
				Attendance: 5,000

18 December 1943 Southern League	Hearts	6–3	Third Lanark	Tynecastle Park
				Attendance: 7,000

25 December 1943 Southern League	Hearts	5–2	St Mirren	Tynecastle Park

1 January 1944 Southern League	Hibernian	0–1	Hearts	Easter Road
				Attendance: 20,000

3 January 1944 Southern League	Hamilton Academical	2–1	Hearts	Tynecastle Park

8 January 1944 Southern League	Celtic	4–0	Hearts	Tynecastle Park

15 January 1944 Southern League	Hearts	1–1	Airdrieonians	Tynecastle Park
				Attendance: 5,000

22 January 1944 Southern League	Morton	1–3	Hearts	Cappielow Park

29 January 1944 Southern League	Hearts	1–3	Rangers	Tynecastle Park
				Attendance: 25,000

5 February 1944 Southern League	Queen's Park	2–2	Hearts	Hampden Park

12 February 1944 Southern League	Hearts	2–2	Clyde	Tynecastle Park
				Attendance: 6,000

19 February 1944 Southern League	Dumbarton	2–1	Hearts	Boghead Park

26 February 1944 Southern League	Hearts	1–0	Albion Rovers	Tynecastle Park

== See also ==
- List of Heart of Midlothian F.C. seasons
