= Southern Football League Cup =

Southern Football League Cup or Southern League Cup may refer to:

- Southern League Cup (Scotland)
- Southern Football League Cup (England)
