= William McAulay =

Scottish footballer (1879–1935)

Willie McAulay
Personal information
- Full name: William McAulay
- Date of birth: 1 November 1879
- Place of birth: Newton, Scotland
- Date of death: 1935 (aged 55–56)
- Place of death: Glasgow, Scotland
- Position: Inside left

Senior career*
Years	Team	Apps	(Gls)
- Newton Athletic
- Newton Thistle
?–1898	Cambuslang Hibernian		
1898	Celtic	1	(1)
1898–1899	Sheffield Wednesday		
1899	→ Dundee (loan)		
1899–1900	Walsall Town Swifts		
1900–1901	Aston Villa	4	(0)
1901–1902	Portsmouth		
1902–1903	Middlesbrough		
1903–1906	Aberdeen	63	(20)
1904	→ Arthurlie (loan)		
1906–1907	Falkirk	23	(4)
1907–1909	Hibernian	5	(1)
1909–1913	Alloa Athletic		
- * Club domestic league appearances and goals

William McAulay (1 November 1879 – 1935) was a Scottish footballer who played as an inside left. He played for several league clubs in Scotland and England, with his longest spells at Aberdeen and Alloa Athletic.

== Career ==
Born in Newton near Cambuslang in 1879, as a teenager McAulay played for local teams in the village and for Junior side Cambuslang Hibernian. He was signed by Celtic in April 1898 and scored in his single league appearance before being released by the Glasgow club in October of the same year in a cost-cutting measure.

McAulay was picked up by Sheffield Wednesday but only featured for their reserves and went back to Scotland on loan to Dundee. He then moved to Walsall Town Swifts, and in the three subsequent seasons turned out for Aston Villa, Portsmouth and Middlesbrough. Whilst at Walsall he scored a hat-trick of penalties in the second half of his club's 7-3 win against Luton Town. All three penalties were awarded for handball.

McAulay moved back to Scotland permanently when transferring to Aberdeen in 1903. He was the new club's first-ever league goalscorer after the merger leading to their formation. He spent three seasons at Pittodrie, averaging around a goal every three league games. In 1904 the Aberdeen Evening Gazette commented "He is, off the field, one of the most modest of men, and on it one of the trickiest players going. It is not too much to say that it is his experience and coaching that has made such a vast improvement on the team's forward play". He also spent time on loan at Arthurlie.

In 1906 McAulay moved to Falkirk for a year, at which time the Falkirk Herald said of him "He is extremely smart with his feet, and his dribbling tactics have astonished not a few opponents. He can shoot with accuracy, and seldom fails to gather a possible pass". He transferred to Hibernian in 1907 before spending the final years of his career at Alloa.

McAulay died in 1935.
