= 1945–46 Southern Football League (Scotland) =

The 1945–46 Southern Football League was the sixth and last edition of the regional war-time football league tournament in Scotland.

With the war itself at an end, the clubs from the North Eastern League joined the setup, although only Aberdeen (who had won four of the eight half-season North Eastern tournaments) participated in the A Division; the rest of the clubs were placed in the B Division along with some from the Southern region including those who had finished at the foot of the table in its previous season.

Rangers were the last winners, thus completing a clean sweep of the seven wartime league seasons including the Emergency League in 1939–40. The Glasgow club had also won the final regular championship in 1938–39, and went on to win the next after official competitions were resumed in the 1946–47 season.

Dundee won the B Division by a large margin but was not promoted, with the SFL opting to keep the 16-team Southern League setup (this would remain in place until an expansion to 18 in 1955–56) – although it had been a 20-team division in 1938–39. Dundee also won the 1946–47 Scottish Division B title to regain a top-level place which they had held since their formation in 1893 and only relinquished for the first time in 1938.

== A Division ==
Pos	Team	Pld	W	D	L	GF	GA	GD	Pts
1	Rangers (C)	30	22	4	4	85	41	+44	48
2	Hibernian	30	17	6	7	67	37	+30	40
3	Aberdeen	30	16	6	8	73	41	+32	38
4	Celtic	30	12	11	7	55	44	+11	35
5	Clyde	30	11	9	10	64	54	+10	31
6	Motherwell	30	11	9	10	54	55	−1	31
7	Heart of Midlothian	30	11	8	11	63	57	+6	30
8	Queen's Park	30	11	8	11	60	60	0	30
9	Third Lanark	30	14	2	14	63	68	−5	30
10	Morton	30	9	11	10	72	69	+3	29
11	Falkirk	30	11	5	14	62	70	−8	27
12	Partick Thistle	30	11	4	15	54	65	−11	26
13	Queen of the South	30	9	6	15	62	82	−20	24
14	St Mirren	30	9	5	16	54	70	−16	23
15	Kilmarnock	30	7	8	15	56	87	−31	22
16	Hamilton Academical	30	5	6	19	44	88	−44	16

(C) Champions

== B Division ==
Pos	Team	Pld	W	D	L	GF	GA	GD	Pts
1	Dundee	26	21	2	3	92	28	+64	44
2	Ayr United	26	15	4	7	69	43	+26	34
3	East Fife	26	15	4	7	64	34	+30	34
4	Airdrieonians	26	14	5	7	69	50	+19	33
5	Albion Rovers	26	14	2	10	45	41	+4	30
6	St Johnstone	26	12	6	8	66	60	+6	30
7	Alloa Athletic	26	12	4	10	59	53	+6	28
8	Dumbarton	26	11	4	11	59	54	+5	26
9	Dunfermline Athletic	26	10	4	12	63	47	+16	24
10	Cowdenbeath	26	8	5	13	43	62	−19	21
11	Stenhousemuir	26	6	5	15	36	89	−53	17
12	Dundee United	26	6	3	17	46	70	−24	15
13	Arbroath	26	6	2	18	40	88	−48	14
14	Raith Rovers	26	6	2	18	48	80	−32	14
