= Peter McKay (footballer) =

Scottish footballer

Personal information
- Full name: Peter McKay
- Date of birth: 23 February 1925
- Place of birth: Newburgh, Scotland
- Date of death: 23 November 2000 (aged 75)
- Place of death: Corby, England
- Position: Centre forward

Youth career
- Newburgh West End

Senior career*
Years	Team	Apps	(Gls)
1947–1954	Dundee United	185	(158)
1954–57	Burnley	60	(36)
1957–58	St Mirren	34	(19)
- Corby Town
- * Club domestic league appearances and goals

Peter McKay (23 February 1925 – 23 November 2000) was a Scottish footballer. He holds the record of being Dundee United's all-time top goalscorer, with 158 league goals and 202 overall. McKay also played for Burnley and St Mirren. He retired to Northamptonshire, where he died in 2000.

McKay was inducted into Dundee United's Hall of fame in 2009, with members of his family present.
