= Jimmy Stephen =

Scottish footballer

Personal information
- Full name: James Findlay Stephen
- Date of birth: 23 August 1922
- Place of birth: Johnshaven, Aberdeenshire, Scotland
- Date of death: 5 November 2012 (aged 90)
- Place of death: Southsea, Hampshire, England
- Position: Defender

Youth career
- 1937–1938: Johnshaven Dauntless
- 1938–1939: Bradford (Park Avenue)

Senior career*
Years	Team	Apps	(Gls)
1939–1949	Bradford (Park Avenue)	94	(0)
1949–1955	Portsmouth	100	(0)
1955–1956	Yeovil Town		
1956–1957	Bridgwater Town		
1957–1959	Newport (Isle of Wight)		
1959-1960	Waterlooville		

International career
1944–1945	Scotland (wartime)	5	(0)
1946–1947	Scotland	2	(0)

Managerial career
- 1956–1957: Bridgwater Town (coach)
- 1957–1959: Newport (Isle of Wight) (coach)
- 1959-1960: Waterlooville (coach)
- * Club domestic league appearances and goals

James Findlay Stephen (23 August 1922 – 5 November 2012) was a Scottish footballer who played as a defender. At club level, he played in the Football League for Bradford (Park Avenue) and Portsmouth. He also played in two full international matches for Scotland.

Stephen signed for Bradford when he left school in 1938, and turned professional the following year. During the Second World War he made guest appearances for clubs including Halifax Town, Middlesbrough and Huddersfield Town. He left Bradford for Portsmouth in 1949, although National Service in the RAF meant he was restricted to a solitary appearance in the Portsmouth team that won the 1949–50 League title. He finished his career in non-league football with Yeovil Town before becoming a player-coach at Bridgwater Town, Newport in the Isle of Wight, and Waterlooville

Having represented Scotland in five wartime internationals against England, Stephen made his full international debut as captain in the first competitive match Scotland played after the war, a 3–1 defeat to Wales on 19 October 1946 in the British Home Championship. His second and last cap came a year later, also against Wales.

== See also ==
- List of Scotland national football team captains
- List of Scotland wartime international footballers
