= 1945–46 in Scottish football =

Southern League A Division champions
- Rangers

Southern League B Division champions
- Dundee

Victory Cup winners
- Rangers

Southern League Cup winners
- Aberdeen

B Division Supplementary Cup winners
- Airdrie

Junior Cup winners
- Fauldhouse United

The 1945–46 season was the 73rd season of competitive football in Scotland and the seventh and final season of special wartime football during World War II.

== Overview ==
Between 1939 and 1946 normal competitive football was suspended in Scotland. Many footballers signed up to fight in the war and as a result many teams were depleted, and fielded guest players instead. The Scottish Football League and Scottish Cup were suspended and in their place regional league competitions were set up. Appearances in these tournaments do not count in players' official records.

== Honours ==
In contrast to previous wartime seasons a single league, the Southern League, operated for Scotland with two divisions (although its membership did not include all the pre-war Scottish league clubs). No country-wide cup competition took place, although a number of regional competitions continued including the Glasgow Cup, and a Southern League Cup was competed for, a competition which later formed the basis of the League Cup. In addition a Supplementary Cup was played for by B Division teams.

Competition	Winner
Southern League 'A'	Rangers
Southern League 'B'	Dundee
Victory Cup	Rangers
Southern League Cup	Aberdeen
B Division Supplementary Cup	Airdrie
Aberdeenshire Cup	Buckie Thistle
East of Scotland Shield	Hearts
Fife Cup	East Fife
Forfarshire Cup	Dundee
Glasgow Cup	Queen's Park
Renfrewshire Cup	St Mirren
Southern Counties Cup	Nithsdale Wanderers

== International ==
In keeping with the other wartime seasons the Scotland national football team went on official hiatus, although unofficial games, appearances for which do not count towards the final caps totals of participants, continued.

Scotland faced England in one such match on 13 April 1946 at Hampden Park. In front of 139, 468 spectators Scotland won 1–0 with a Jimmy Delaney goal in what was dubbed a 'Victory International'. The Scotland line-up featured: Bobby Brown, Davie Shaw, Jock Shaw, Billy Campbell, Frank Brennan, Jackie Husband, Willie Waddell, Neil Dougall, Jimmy Delaney, George Hamilton, Billy Liddell.

A second game against England was also played at Maine Road, Manchester on 24 April 1946. This game was neither an official nor a victory international but rather was played as a fundraiser for the victims of the Burnden Park Disaster. A crowd of 70,000 witnessed a 2–2 draw with Willie Thornton scoring twice for Scotland. Their line-up featured: Willie Miller, Davie Shaw, Jock Shaw, Billy Campbell, Frank Brennan, Jackie Husband, Willie Waddell, Neil Dougall, Willie Thornton, George Hamilton, Billy Liddell.

For the first time since before the war Scotland also faced opposition other than England. On 23 January 1946 a crowd of 48,830 at Hampden saw Scotland draw 2–2 with Belgium, with Jimmy Delaney scoring both goals. The line-up was: Bobby Brown, Jimmy McGowan, Jock Shaw (captain), Jimmy Campbell, Andy Paton, George Paterson, Gordon Smith, Archibald Baird, Jimmy Delaney, Johnny Deakin, Jimmy Walker. Both the Scottish Football Association and the Royal Belgian Football Association afford this game full international status, although it is not recognised as such by FIFA.

In similar circumstances Scotland faced Switzerland at Hampden on 15 May 1946. In front of 111,899 fans Scotland won 3–1 with two from Liddell and one from Delaney. The line-up was: Bobby Brown, Davie Shaw, Jock Shaw, Billy Campbell, Frank Brennan, Jackie Husband, Willie Waddell, Willie Thornton, Jimmy Delaney, Tommy Walker, Billy Liddell.

== See also ==
- Association football during World War II
