= 1917–18 in Scottish football =

Football in Scotland
- Season: 1917–18

1917–18 in Scottish football

Division One champions
- Rangers

Junior Cup winners
- Petershill

The 1917–18 season was the 45th season of competitive football in Scotland and the 28th season of the Scottish Football League. Division One was decreased from 20 to 18 clubs. Clydebank made their first appearance in the Scottish Football League.

== League competitions ==
=== Scottish Football League ===
Pos	Team	Pld	W	D	L	GF	GA	GD	Pts
1	Rangers (C)	34	25	6	3	66	24	+42	56
2	Celtic	34	24	7	3	66	26	+40	55
3	Kilmarnock	34	19	5	10	69	41	+28	43
4	Morton	34	17	9	8	53	42	+11	43
5	Motherwell	34	16	9	9	70	51	+19	41
6	Partick Thistle	34	14	12	8	51	37	+14	40
7	Dumbarton	34	13	8	13	48	49	−1	34
7	Queen's Park	34	14	6	14	64	63	+1	34
9	Clydebank	34	14	5	15	55	56	−1	33
10	Hearts	34	14	4	16	41	58	−17	32
11	St Mirren	34	11	7	16	42	50	−8	29
12	Hamilton Academical	34	11	6	17	52	63	−11	28
13	Third Lanark	34	10	7	17	56	62	−6	27
14	Falkirk	34	9	9	16	38	58	−20	27
15	Airdrieonians	34	10	6	18	46	58	−12	26
16	Hibernian	34	8	9	17	42	57	−15	25
17	Clyde	34	9	2	23	37	72	−35	20
18	Ayr United	34	5	9	20	32	61	−29	19

(C) Champions

Champions: Rangers

== Other honours ==
=== Cup honours ===
==== National ====
Competition (Note: The Scottish Cup, Scottish Qualifying Cup (except 1914–15 and 1918–19), and Scottish Amateur Cup were not held during WWI years.)	Winner	Score	Runner-up
Navy and Army War Fund Shield	Celtic	1 – 0	Morton
Scottish Junior Cup	Petershill (Note: Trophy awarded to Petershill after Renfrew and Parkhead refused to player their semi final.)		

==== County ====
Competition (Note: The Border Cup, North of Scotland Cup, and Perthshire Cup were not held during WWI years. The Aberdeenshire Cup, Ayrshire Cup, Forfarshire Cup, Stirlingshire Cup, and Southern Counties Cup were not held either after 1914–15.) (Note: The Linlithgowshire Cup was not held this season.)	Winner	Score	Runner-up
Dumbartonshire Cup	Clydebank	1 – 0	Dumbarton
East of Scotland Shield	Hibernian	5 – 1 (Note: Aggregate over two legs.)	Hearts
Fife Cup	Dunfermline Athletic	1 – 0 (Note: Replay needed.)	Raith Rovers
Glasgow Cup	Rangers	4 – 1	Partick Thistle
Lanarkshire Cup	Airdrie	2 – 0	Albion Rovers
Renfrewshire Cup	Morton	5 – 3	St Mirren

=== Non-league honours ===
Senior Leagues

Division	Winner
Eastern League	Cowdenbeath
Western League	Albion Rovers

== Scotland national team ==
There were no Scotland matches played with the British Home Championship suspended due to World War I.

== See also ==
- 1917–18 Rangers F.C. season
- Association football during World War I
