= Bobby Baxter (footballer, born 1911) =

Scottish footballer and manager

Personal information
- Full name: Robert Denholm Baxter
- Date of birth: 23 January 1911
- Place of birth: Edinburgh, Scotland
- Date of death: April 1991
- Position: Centre half

Senior career*
Years	Team	Apps	(Gls)
–	Musselburgh Bruntonians		
1931–1946	Middlesbrough	247	(19)
1946–1947	Heart of Midlothian	25	(0)
Total		266	(25)

International career
1938–1939	Scotland	3	(0)
1939–1944	Scotland (wartime)	4	(0)
1941	Scottish League XI	1	(0)

Managerial career
- 1947–1950: Leith Athletic
- 1951–1955: Cowdenbeath
- * Club domestic league appearances and goals

Robert Denholm Baxter (23 January 1911 – April 1991) was a Scottish footballer best known for his time with English club Middlesbrough.

== Career ==
Baxter was born in the Gilmerton area of Edinburgh. A dominating centre half and a great tackler, he joined Middlesbrough from junior club Musselburgh Bruntonians in 1931 after being spotted by manager Peter McWilliam. The match McWilliam had been to Scotland to watch had been cancelled and after going to watch Musselburgh instead, he spotted the young defender and decided to sign him.

Baxter went on to play 247 times for Middlesbrough, playing in nine different positions and later became club captain. He remained at Middlesbrough until 1946, but played for both Heart of Midlothian and Hibernian in unofficial matches during World War II. While at Middlesbrough he earned three caps for the Scotland national team, the third as captain against England in 1939. He subsequently played against England in four unofficial internationals during the war, and also made an appearance for the Scottish League XI in a 1941 fundraising match, although the league itself was not operating (officially the team represented the wartime Southern League) and he was only a guest player (for Hibs) at the time.

Upon the return of official professional football in the 1946–47 season, Baxter returned to Scotland where he played for Hearts for a single season. In 1947 he became manager of Leith Athletic and was also joint manager of Scottish speedway team Edinburgh Monarchs. He later managed Cowdenbeath, where he was appointed in 1951.

Baxter's son, also named Bobby, played professional football for Darlington, Brighton & Hove Albion and Torquay United.

== See also ==
- List of Scotland wartime international footballers
- List of Scottish football families
