= Gordon Bremner =

Scottish footballer (1917–1988)

Personal information
- Full name: Gordon Hutton Bremner
- Date of birth: 12 November 1917
- Place of birth: Glasgow, Scotland
- Date of death: 1988 (aged 70)
- Place of death: Cheshire, England
- Height: 5 ft 8 in (1.73 m)
- Position: Inside forward

Youth career
- Cartha Athletic

Senior career*
Years	Team	Apps	(Gls)
1937–1946	Arsenal	15	(4)
1946–1951	Motherwell	99	(17)

International career
1941	Scottish League XI	1	(1)
1942	Scotland (wartime)	2	(0)
- * Club domestic league appearances and goals

Gordon Hutton Bremner (12 November 1917 – 1988) was a Scottish professional footballer who played for Arsenal and Motherwell, as an inside forward. He also played in wartime matches for Scotland and the Scottish League XI.

His elder brother Thomas (known as 'Hutton') was also a footballer, who played in the same position and whose clubs included Motherwell and Queen's Park.

Gordon Bremner died in Cheshire in 1988, at the age of 70.
