= Jimmy Littlejohn =

Scottish footballer and manager

Personal information
- Full name: James Adam Littlejohn
- Date of birth: 8 July 1910
- Place of birth: Glasgow, Scotland
- Date of death: 24 August 1989 (aged 79)
- Place of death: Dundee, Scotland
- Position: Centre half

Senior career*
Years	Team	Apps	(Gls)
1934–1939	St Anthony's		
1934–1939	St Johnstone	52	(0)
1939	Cowdenbeath	0	(0)

Managerial career
- 1942–44: Dundee United
- * Club domestic league appearances and goals

James Adam Littlejohn (8 July 1910 – 24 August 1989) was a Scottish football player and manager.

== Career ==
He won Scotland junior international caps before joining St Johnstone in 1934. He moved to Cowdenbeath in 1939, but signed for Dundee United under wartime conditions.

He was influential in the club's unexpected progress to the final of the Emergency War Cup at Hampden Park, when he led the side following an injury to captain Jerry Kerr (United lost 1–0 to Rangers). That was the only season he played for United, but he was invited to join the board in 1942 and after the abrupt departure of manager Jimmy Allan in October of that year, he was asked by fellow directors to take over. He remained in post for just over two years, a period in which United struggled in the North Eastern League as they found it difficult to attract the better players available during the unusual conditions of wartime. Littlejohn handed over the manager's job to one of his players, Charlie McGillivray, in November 1944, but remained a director.

With the exception of three years when he stepped down due to ill health, he was a board member for the rest of his life, though his greatest contribution to Dundee United was the establishment of Taypools. It was he who spotted the scheme's potential, and without its invaluable financial input it is unlikely that the club could have become established in Division One during the 1960s.

His son, Bill, was a director at Tannadice from 1989 to 2002 and the club's chief executive between October 2000 and January 2002.
