= Glasgow Cup =

Football tournament open to teams from Glasgow, Scotland

- Organiser(s): Glasgow Football Association
- Founded: 1887
- Region: Glasgow
- Teams: 5
- Current champions: Rangers B (2025)

The Glasgow Cup is a football tournament open to teams from Glasgow, Scotland. Operated by the Glasgow Football Association, it was competed for annually by senior Glasgow clubs from 1887 until 1989. It is now (since the 2019–20 amended rules) competed for between the senior teams of Clyde, Partick Thistle and Queen's Park and the youth teams of Celtic and Rangers, and has used both knockout and round robin formats to determine the finalists.

The cup was dominated by the city's Old Firm rivals, Rangers and Celtic, who won the competition 44 times and 29 times respectively (including one shared win) while it was a senior competition. Only five times did the final not feature either Rangers or Celtic (1889, 1915, 1946, 1947, and 1989). The advent of European football led to the Glasgow Cup becoming less valued, and the tournament did not take place at all or was not finished several times in its later years. Since it was reinstated for youth teams, Rangers have won a further 15 editions, ahead of Celtic with 11 (following the 2022 final).

The Glasgow Cup should not be confused with the Scottish Youth Cup, which is open to youth sections of clubs across Scotland but has featured a Celtic v Rangers final nine times since its inception in 1983, often played within a few weeks of the Glasgow Cup final.

== History ==
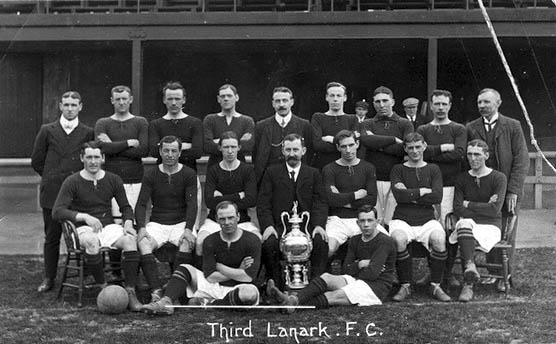
1904 Third Lanark squad photo with the Glasgow Cup - they would end the season as Scottish champions

The Glasgow Football Association Cup was once seen as an important competition, on a par with the League or the Scottish Cup. It was contested by the senior clubs in the Glasgow area, with the winners receiving a globular silver trophy. The competition was dominated by the old rivals of Celtic and Rangers, but the others, Clyde, Partick Thistle, Queen's Park and the now defunct Third Lanark all enjoyed relative success.

The competition's status diminished after World War II, with European competitions seeming more attractive and important, and the nationwide Scottish League Cup providing a new distraction for clubs and supporters and a rival for fixture dates. The competition was normally played early in the season, until 1960. After the demise of the similar Glasgow Charity Cup, the Glasgow Cup fixtures would be put in any available space with the final being played at the end of the season.

After 1971, the Glasgow Cup was not played until it was re-introduced for the 1974–75 season, but it was generally seen as unappealing, and was even left incomplete on occasion; otherwise the final was often held over until the beginning of the following season. In the event of a Celtic v Rangers final, both would still usually put out full-strength first teams. This remained the case up to 1986 when a crowd of over 40,000 saw Rangers take the trophy with a 3–2 win over Scottish champions Celtic, courtesy of an Ally McCoist hat-trick, to give manager Graeme Souness his first trophy days after taking charge. After that, it essentially became a reserve team tournament. Rangers retained the trophy the following season in another old rivals final; only 15,000 were there to watch what were effectively two reserve teams. The following season's contest was never completed. Officially there were no suitable dates available to fit in ties; in reality, the competition had become irrelevant. In 1988 the competition was abandoned, and the final edition was played out in 1989 with Partick Thistle becoming the final winners of the competition in its original format.

The Glasgow Cup was subsequently relaunched in 1990 as an Under-19 tournament competed for by the youth teams of Celtic, Clyde, Partick Thistle, Queen's Park and Rangers. It then became an Under-17 tournament in 2008, competed for by the same teams as previously (although Clyde, once based in Rutherglen on the city boundary, had since relocated to Cumbernauld some distance outside Glasgow).

From the 2019 competition, the age limit was raised to Under-20, with several players involved in the Celtic v Rangers final that year having already featured for the clubs' senior teams in domestic and European competitions; the match itself, played at Celtic Park, did not involve any public ticket sales due to concerns regarding spectator disorder as had occurred in previous years.

The format was changed again for 2019–20, with the Old Firm clubs now fielding under-21s plus two overage players, and the other three clubs using their first teams with two trialists, in a home-and-away league basis followed by a final between the top two. In the opening round of fixtures, Clyde's 50-year-old manager Danny Lennon drew attention in the media when he brought himself on as a substitute in a win over Celtic's 'colts'. That edition was delayed then eventually cancelled due to the COVID-19 pandemic in Scotland, with no competition in 2020–21 and a shorter version (one round of fixtures rather than two) in 2021–22.

Ahead of the 2022–23 season, the Glasgow FA launched a City of Glasgow Women's Cup. Two teams contested the first final at Excelsior Stadium in Airdrie: Rangers won 2–1 against Celtic. The same finalists and scoreline occurred a year later in Cumbernauld.

== Finals ==
Key

(R)	Replay
(SR)	Second Replay

Year	Winners	Score	Runners-up	Venue	Attendance
Senior
1887–88	Cambuslang	3–1	Rangers	Hampden Park [II]	
1888–89	Queen's Park	8–0	Partick Thistle	Ibrox Park [I]	6,000
1889–90	Queen's Park	3–2	Celtic	Cathkin Park [I]	12,000
1890–91	Celtic	4–0	Third Lanark	Hampden Park [II]	
1891–92	Celtic	7–1	Clyde	Cathkin Park [I]	
1892–93	Rangers	3–1	Celtic	Cathkin Park [I]	12,000
1893–94	Rangers	1–0	Cowlairs	Cathkin Park [I]	3,000
1894–95	Celtic	2–0	Rangers	Cathkin Park [I]	20,000
1895–96	Celtic	6–3	Queen's Park	Ibrox Park [I]	25,000
1896–97	Rangers	1–1	Celtic	Cathkin Park [I]	15,000
1896–97 (R)	Rangers	2–1	Celtic	Cathkin Park [I]	
1897–98	Rangers	4–0	Queen's Park	Cathkin Park [I]	15,000
1898–99	Queen's Park	1–0	Rangers	Cathkin Park [I]	16,000
1899–1900	Rangers	1–1	Celtic	Cathkin Park [I]	
1899–1900 (R)	Rangers	1–0	Celtic	Cathkin Park [I]	12,000
1900–01	Rangers	3–1	Partick Thistle	Celtic Park	
1901–02	Rangers	2–2	Celtic	Ibrox Park	40,000
1901–02(R)	Rangers	W/O (Note: Rangers were awarded the cup as Celtic declined to replay at Ibrox Park, with the first match having also been played there.)	Celtic	N/A	N/A
1902–03	Third Lanark	3–0	Celtic	Ibrox Park	20,000
1903–04	Third Lanark	1–1	Celtic		20,000
1903–04 (R)	Third Lanark	1–0	Celtic		16,000
1904–05	Celtic	2–1	Rangers		55,000
1905–06	Celtic	3–0	Third Lanark		22,000
1906–07	Celtic	3–2	Third Lanark	Ibrox Park	40,000
1907–08	Celtic	2–2	Rangers		70,000
1907–08 (R)	Celtic	0–0	Rangers		
1907–08 (SR)	Celtic	2–1	Rangers		56,000
1908–09	Third Lanark	1–1	Celtic	Hampden Park	22,000
1908–09 (R)	Third Lanark	2–2	Celtic		26,000
1908–09 (SR)	Third Lanark	4–0	Celtic	Hampden Park	17,000
1909–10	Celtic	1–0	Rangers		55,000
1910–11	Rangers	3–1	Celtic	Hampden Park	67,000
1911–12	Rangers	1–0	Partick Thistle	Celtic Park	57,000
1912–13	Rangers	3–1	Celtic	Hampden Park	80,000
1913–14	Rangers	3–0	Third Lanark		50,000
1914–15	Clyde	1–1	Partick Thistle	Ibrox Park	25,000
1914–15 (R)	Clyde	1–0	Partick Thistle	Ibrox Park	13,000
1915–16	Celtic	2–1	Rangers		70,000
1916–17	Celtic	3–1	Clyde		30,000
1917–18	Rangers	4–1	Partick Thistle		45,000
1918–19	Rangers	2–0	Celtic		60,000
1919–20	Celtic	1–0	Partick Thistle		45,000
1920–21	Celtic	1–0	Clyde		40,000
1921–22	Rangers	1–0	Celtic		80,000
1922–23	Rangers	0–0	Clyde		
1922–23 (R)	Rangers	1–0	Clyde		25,000
1923–24	Rangers	3–1	Third Lanark		25,000
1924–25	Rangers	4–1	Celtic		
1925–26	Clyde	2–1	Celtic		23,000
1926–27	Celtic	1–0	Rangers		51,000
1927–28	Celtic	2–1	Rangers		84,000
1928–29	Celtic	2–0	Queen's Park		
1929–30	Rangers	0–0	Celtic		74,399
1929–30 (R)	Rangers	4–0	Celtic		41,500
1930–31	Celtic	2–1	Rangers		
1931–32	Rangers	3–0	Queen's Park		50,000
1932–33	Rangers	1–0	Partick Thistle		35,000
1933–34	Rangers	2–0	Clyde		24,000
1934–35	Partick Thistle	1–0	Rangers		26,000
1935–36	Rangers	2–0	Celtic		50,000
1936–37	Rangers	2–2	Partick Thistle		
1936–37 (R)	Rangers	6–1	Partick Thistle		
1937–38	Rangers	2–1	Third Lanark		
1938–39	Celtic	3–0	Clyde		43,976
1939–40	Rangers	3–1	Queen's Park		15,000
1940–41	Celtic	1–0	Rangers		50,000
1941–42	Rangers	6–0	Clyde		40,000
1942–43	Rangers	5–2	Third Lanark		
1943–44	Rangers	2–0	Clyde		30,000
1944–45	Rangers	3–2	Celtic		
1945–46	Queen's Park	2–0	Clyde		40,000
1946–47	Clyde	2–1	Third Lanark		30,000
1947–48	Rangers	4–1	Third Lanark		
1948–49	Celtic	3–1	Third Lanark		87,000
1949–50	Rangers	2–2	Clyde		53,177
1949–50 (R)	Rangers	2–1	Clyde		40,000
1950–51	Partick Thistle	1–1	Celtic		
1950–51 (R)	Partick Thistle	3–2	Celtic		51,300
1951–52	Clyde	2–1	Celtic		
1952–53	Partick Thistle	3–1	Rangers		44,000
1953–54	Rangers	3–0	Third Lanark		35,807
1954–55	Partick Thistle	2–0	Rangers		40,000
1955–56	Celtic	1–1	Rangers		53,600
1955–56 (R)	Celtic	5–3	Rangers		39,000
1956–57	Rangers	2–0	Clyde		30,000
1957–58	Rangers	1–1	Third Lanark		
1957–58 (R)	Rangers	4–2	Third Lanark		
1958–59	Clyde	0–0	Rangers		
1958–59 (R)	Clyde	1–0	Rangers		
1959–60	Rangers	2–1	Partick Thistle		
1960–61	Partick Thistle	2–0	Celtic		
1961–62	Celtic	1–1	Third Lanark		
1961–62 (R)	Celtic	3–2	Third Lanark		12,000
1962–63	Third Lanark	2–1	Celtic		
1963–64	Celtic	2–0	Clyde		13,500
1964–65	Celtic	5–0	Queen's Park		17,051
1965–66	Not completed				
1966–67	Celtic	4–0	Partick Thistle		31,000
1967–68	Celtic	8–0	Clyde		35,000
1968–69	Rangers	3–2	Partick Thistle		
1969–70	Celtic	3–1	Rangers		58,144
1970–71	Rangers	2–0	Clyde		
1971–72	No competition				
1972–73	No competition				
1973–74	No competition				
1974–75	Rangers 2–2 Celtic (shared)				70,000
1975–76	Rangers	3–1	Celtic		55,000
1976–77	Not completed				
1977–78	No competition				
1978–79	Rangers	3–1	Celtic		2,000
1979–80	Not completed				
1980–81	Partick Thistle	1–0	Celtic		5,000
1981–82	Celtic	2–1	Rangers		
1982–83	Rangers	1–0	Celtic		
1983–84	No competition				
1984–85	Rangers	5–0	Queen's Park		3,584
1985–86	Rangers	3–2	Celtic		
1986–87	Rangers	1–0	Celtic		
1987–88	Not completed				
1988–89	Partick Thistle	2–0	Clyde		
Under–19
1989–90	Celtic	2–0	Rangers		
1990–91	Celtic	3–2	Partick Thistle		
1991–92	Rangers	1–0	Celtic		
1992–93	Rangers	1–0	Celtic		
1993–94	Rangers	1–0	Celtic		
1994–95	Rangers	3–1	Celtic		
1995–96	Rangers	1–0	Celtic		
1996–97	Celtic	5–0	Partick Thistle		
1997–98	Celtic	1–1 (3–0 pens.)	Rangers		
1998–99	Rangers	2–1	Celtic		
1999–2000	Rangers	1–0	Celtic		
2000–01	Not completed				
2001–02	No competition				
2002–03	No competition				
2003–04	Rangers	2–0	Celtic		
2004–05	Not completed				
2005–06	No competition				
2006–07	No competition				
Under–17
2007–08	Celtic	3–1	Rangers		
2008–09	Rangers	2–1	Celtic		
2009–10	Rangers	2–1	Celtic		
2010–11	Celtic	1–0	Rangers		
2011–12	Rangers	1–1 (4–2 pens.)	Celtic		
2012–13	Rangers	3–2	Celtic		
2013–14	Celtic	1–0	Rangers		
2014–15	Celtic	2–0	Rangers		
2015–16	Celtic	4–0	Rangers		
2016–17	Celtic	2–1	Rangers		
2017–18	Rangers	3–0	Celtic		
Under–20
2018–19	Celtic	3–2	Rangers	Hampden Park	
Senior / Team B
2019–20	Not completed				
2020–21	No competition				
2021–22	Rangers B	3–1	Queen's Park	Broadwood	
2022–23	Celtic B	3–3 (Note: Celtic B won 4–3 in a penalty shootout.)	Rangers B	Ibrox Stadium	
2023-24	Rangers B	3-1	Celtic B	Lesser Hampden	
2024-25	Rangers B	1-1 (Note: Rangers B won 5-4 in a penalty shootout.)	Celtic B	Firhill Stadium	

== Performance by club ==
=== Competition record ===
(119 finals played including one walkover win and one shared title)

As of 17 December 2024

Club	Wins	Last win	Runners-up	Last final lost
Rangers	44 (Note: Includes one walkover in 1902 and one title shared in 1975 with Celtic.)	1987	18	1982
Celtic	29 (Note: Includes one title shared in 1975 with Rangers.)	1982	27 (Note: Includes one walkover 'defeat' in 1902.)	1987
Rangers Youth	15 (Note: Includes one title won by Rangers B, eight titles won by Rangers U-19s and five titles won by Rangers U-17s.)	2024	10	2023
Celtic Youth	12 (Note: Includes one title won by Celtic B, one title won by Celtic U-20s, four titles won by Celtic U-19s and six titles won by Celtic U-17s.)	2023	13	2018
Partick Thistle	7	1989	11	1969
Clyde	5	1959	15	1989
Third Lanark	4	1963	13	1962
Queen's Park	4	1946	8	2022
Cambuslang	1	1888	—	—
Partick Thistle Youth	—	—	2	1997
Cowlairs	—	—	1	1894

== Women's football ==
The first edition of the City of Glasgow Women's Cup was played in July 2022.

Year	Winners	Score	Runners-up	Venue	Attendance
2022–23	Rangers	2–1	Celtic	Excelsior Stadium	
2023–24	Rangers	2–1	Celtic	Broadwood Stadium	

== See also ==
- Glasgow Merchants Charity Cup
- East of Scotland Shield
