= North Eastern Football League Cup =

Scottish football competition

North Eastern League Cup
- Sport: Football
- Founded: 1941
- Folded: 1945
- No. of teams: 8
- Country: Scotland
- Last champion: Aberdeen
- Most titles: Aberdeen (5)
- Related competitions: North Eastern League

The North Eastern League Cup was a regional Scottish football competition held during the Second World War, due to the suspension of Scottish Football League. Held between 1941 and 1945, the competition was played in two stages each season (autumn and spring), mirroring the North Eastern League.

Aberdeen dominated the tournament, winning five times overall. Indeed, they appeared in six of the eight finals, only losing the second series in the 1941–42 season. Rangers 'A' (the Glasgow club's reserve team) won both series in the 1943–44 season and Dundee United won the remaining tournament.

The North Eastern League Cup helped to contribute to the present-day Scottish League Cup: it was also merged with its Southern equivalent in the 1945–46 season, with the nationwide competition proving popular (the final, won by Aberdeen, attracted a crowd of crowd of 135,000 at Hampden Park). It was thus continued on those lines on an official basis from then on.

As the war ended, regular league football returned in 1946, with the regional leagues and cups disbanded.

== 1941–42 ==
=== First Series ===
Team 1	Agg.	Team 2	1st leg	2nd leg
Dundee United	6 – 7	Aberdeen	4–1	2–6

Ties played 13 and 20 Dec

=== Second Series ===
Team 1	Agg.	Team 2	1st leg	2nd leg
Aberdeen	5–6	Dundee United	3–4	1–1 (a.e.t.)

Ties played 16 and 23 May

== 1942–43 ==
=== First Series ===
Team 1	Agg.	Team 2	1st leg	2nd leg
Dunfermline Athletic	3 – 9	Aberdeen	2–3	1–6

Ties played 19 and 26 Dec

=== Second Series ===
Team 1	Agg.	Team 2	1st leg	2nd leg
Raith Rovers	3 – 7	Aberdeen	1–1	2–6

Ties played 8, 15 and 22 May – the first tie on 8 May was abandoned due to poor weather

== 1943–44 ==
=== First Series ===
Team 1	Agg.	Team 2	1st leg	2nd leg
Falkirk 'A'	1 – 4	Rangers 'A'	1–3	0–1

Ties played 25 Dec and 31 Jan

=== Second Series ===
Team 1	Agg.	Team 2	1st leg	2nd leg
Rangers 'A'	6 – 4	Raith Rovers	3–2	3–2

Ties played 6 and 13 May

== 1944–45 ==
=== First Series ===
Team 1	Agg.	Team 2	1st leg	2nd leg
Aberdeen	5 – 0	Dundee	5–0	–

Tie played 1 Jan

=== Second Series ===
Team 1	Agg.	Team 2	1st leg	2nd leg
Aberdeen	4 – 3	Heart of Midlothian 'A'	3–3	1–0

Ties played 23 and 30 Jun
