= Summer Cup (Scotland) =

- Founded: 1941
- Abolished: 1965
- Region: Scotland
- Teams: 16 (1940–44, 1963–65); 14 (1944–45)
- Last champions: Motherwell (2nd title)
- Most championships: Hibernian (2 titles); Motherwell (2 titles)

The Summer Cup was a Scottish football competition open to teams in the top division, first of the wartime Southern League from 1940 to 1945 and then of the Scottish League from 1963 to 1965.

== History ==
When the competition was first introduced in 1940 it was organised by the Southern League and was one of two wartime cup competitions run by the League, along with the Southern League Cup. The competition ran from May to June, when the league season had already finished. It was discontinued after 1945.

Just as the one-off Scottish War Emergency Cup of 1940 was a predecessor of sorts to the wartime Summer Cup, the 1946 Victory Cup could be seen as its successor due to the similar format used, although the trophy actually used for the Victory Cup was that of the Southern League Cup, which did have a 1946 edition completed a few weeks earlier.

The Summer Cup was reintroduced in 1963 as a national cup competition for Scottish Football League Division One clubs because running costs for clubs in the top division were getting more expensive. Both Celtic and Rangers declined to take part in either season the competition was played.

The trophy currently resides in the boardroom at Easter Road, the home of Hibernian. Hibs chairman Harry Swan had helped to establish the competition and, when Hibernian won the first final, team manager Willie McCartney suggested that the trophy should be presented to him; Swan's family subsequently gifted the trophy to Hibernian in perpetuity.

== List of Finals ==
=== Southern League ===
Season	Winner	Score	Runner-up	Attendance	Scorers	Venue	Ref
1940–41	Hibernian	3–2	Rangers	37,200	B Baxter, W Finnigan (2);T Gillick, W McIntosh	Hampden Park, Glasgow	
1941–42	Rangers	0–0 ^{1}	Hibernian	60,000		Hampden Park, Glasgow	
1942–43	St Mirren	1–0	Rangers	45,000	A Linwood	Hampden Park, Glasgow	
1943–44	Motherwell	1–0	Clyde	40,000	A Gibson	Hampden Park, Glasgow	
1944–45	Partick Thistle	2–0	Hibernian	20,000	J Johnson (2)	Hampden Park, Glasgow	

- ^{1}Rangers won the final and the cup on a Coin Toss after a goalless draw and 2 corners each.

=== Scottish Division One ===
Season	Home team	Score	Away team	Attendance	Scorers	Venue	Ref
1963–64	Aberdeen	3–2	Hibernian	20,000	E Winchester, A Kerr (2); J Scott (2)	Pittodrie, Aberdeen	
1963–64	Hibernian	2–1 (aet)	Aberdeen	28,000	S Vincent, E Stevenson; C Cooke	Easter Road, Edinburgh	
1963–64	Hibernian and Aberdeen tied 4–4 on aggregate.						
1963–64	Aberdeen	1–3	Hibernian		E Winchester; W Hamilton, J Scott, P Cormack	Pittodrie, Aberdeen	
1963–64	Hibernian beat Aberdeen in play-off match						
1964–65	Motherwell	3–1	Dundee United	12,000	P Delaney (2), J McBride; F Døssing	Fir Park, Motherwel	
1964–65	Dundee United	1–0	Motherwell	18,371	M Berg	Tannadice, Dundee	
1964–65	Motherwell beat Dundee United 3–2 on aggregate.						

== Performance by club ==
Club	Wins	Years won	Runners-up	Years runner-up
Hibernian	2	1940–41, 1963–64	2	1941–42, 1944–45
Motherwell	2	1943–44, 1964–65	0	–
Rangers	1	1941–42	2	1940–41, 1942–43
Partick Thistle	1	1944–45	0	–
St Mirren	1	1942–43	0	–
Aberdeen	0	–	1	1963–64
Clyde	0	–	1	1943–44
Dundee United	0	–	1	1964–65
