= North Eastern Football League (Scotland) =

Scottish football league

North Eastern League
- Sport: Football
- Founded: 1941
- Folded: 1945
- No. of teams: 10
- Country: Scotland
- Last champion: Aberdeen
- Most titles: Aberdeen (4)
- Related competitions: North Eastern League Cup

The North Eastern League was a regional Scottish football competition held during the Second World War, due to the suspension of the Scottish Football League. Held between 1941 and 1945 (an interim nationwide War Emergency League was played in the 1939–40 season followed by one year of hiatus), the competition was played in two stages each season (autumn and spring), with bonus points awarded in the second stage: initially, for teams with higher aggregate scores over the two series; latterly, for away draws/wins. Some reserve teams from the bigger clubs competing in the other region, the Southern League, entered the North Eastern League, with the Rangers 'A' team winning both stages in the first season.

In the 1945–46 season, with the war itself at an end, the North Eastern League merged with the Southern League; however, only Aberdeen participated in the A Division (finishing in third position); the rest of the clubs were placed in the B Division along with some from the Southern region including those who had finished at the foot of the table in its previous edition.

There was also a North Eastern League Cup. Regular football returned in 1946, with the regional competitions disbanded.

== Tables ==
=== 1941–42 ===
==== First Series ====
P	Team	Pld	W	D	L	GF	GA	Pts
1	Rangers 'A'	14	10	2	2	52	22	22
2	East Fife	14	8	5	1	34	16	21
3	Aberdeen	14	8	3	3	49	23	19
4	Dunfermline Athletic	14	6	3	5	38	44	15
5	St Bernard's	14	5	3	6	36	48	13
6	Dundee United	14	3	4	7	32	45	10
7	Raith Rovers	14	3	1	10	40	57	7
8	Leith Athletic	14	2	1	11	31	57	5

==== Second Series ====
P	Team	Pld	W	D	L	GF	GA	BP	Pts
1	Rangers 'A'	14	10	1	3	49	33	5	21
2	Aberdeen	14	9	2	3	37	15	6	20
3	East Fife	14	8	2	4	32	27	4	18
4	Dundee United	14	7	3	4	37	25	4	17
5	Raith Rovers	14	6	2	6	38	38	3	14
6	Dunfermline Athletic	14	4	2	8	30	42	2	10
7	Leith Athletic	14	3	2	9	29	46	1	8
8	St Bernard's	14	1	2	11	19	45	0	4

BP – an extra point was awarded by having a better aggregate score over each opponent

=== 1942–43 ===
==== First Series ====
P	Team	Pld	W	D	L	GF	GA	Pts
1	Aberdeen	14	11	1	2	51	16	23
2	Dunfermline Athletic	14	10	0	4	28	23	20
3	East Fife	14	8	1	5	27	19	17
4	Heart of Midlothian 'A'	14	6	0	8	26	32	12
5	Rangers 'A'	14	6	0	8	30	31	12
6	Dundee United	14	5	0	9	24	36	10
7	Hibernian 'A'	14	4	1	9	29	44	9
8	Raith Rovers	14	4	1	9	23	37	9

==== Second Series ====
P	Team	Pld	W	D	L	GF	GA	BP	Pts
1	Aberdeen	14	10	2	2	39	12	7	22
2	East Fife	14	9	2	3	38	23	5	20
3	Raith Rovers	14	9	1	4	42	34	4	19
4	Dunfermline Athletic	14	6	3	5	30	28	3	15
5	Rangers 'A'	14	5	2	7	32	23	3	12
6	Dundee United	14	5	1	8	25	32	2	11
7	Heart of Midlothian 'A'	14	4	3	7	36	45	2	11
8	Hibernian 'A'	14	1	0	13	19	64	0	2

BP – an extra point was awarded by having a better aggregate score over each opponent

=== 1943–44 ===
==== First Series ====
P	Team	Pld	W	D	L	GF	GA	Pts
1	Raith Rovers	14	11	0	3	42	24	22
2	Heart of Midlothian 'A'	14	9	1	4	35	27	19
3	Aberdeen	14	7	3	4	36	22	17
4	Dunfermline Athletic	14	8	1	5	35	22	17
5	Dundee United	14	7	0	7	36	43	14
6	East Fife	14	4	1	9	22	31	9
7	Rangers 'A'	14	4	1	9	24	22	9
8	Falkirk 'A'	14	2	1	11	15	4	5

==== Second Series ====
P	Team	Pld	W	D	L	GF	GA	BP	Pts
1	Aberdeen	14	9	2	3	40	18	4	20
2	Rangers 'A'	14	9	2	3	42	25	4	20
3	East Fife	14	6	3	5	26	14	3	15
4	Dundee United	14	6	1	7	30	39	2	13
5	Heart of Midlothian 'A'	14	5	2	7	28	33	2	12
6	Dunfermline Athletic	14	5	1	8	27	33	2	11
7	Raith Rovers	14	4	3	7	19	29	2	11
8	Falkirk 'A'	14	4	2	8	27	48	2	10

BP – 3 points were awarded for an away win, 2 points for an away draw

=== 1944–45 ===
==== First Series ====
P	Team	Pld	W	D	L	GF	GA	Pts
1	Dundee	18	13	2	3	56	30	28
2	Raith Rovers	18	10	2	6	42	32	22
3	Dunfermline Athletic	18	8	5	5	49	36	21
4	Arbroath	18	6	4	8	30	43	16
5	East Fife	18	6	4	8	31	44	16
6	Rangers 'A'	18	7	2	9	32	32	16
7	Dundee United	18	5	3	10	34	49	13
8	Heart of Midlothian 'A'	18	5	2	11	31	49	12
9	Falkirk 'A'	18	3	3	12	16	47	9
10	Aberdeen	18	3	1	14	65	21	7

==== Second Series ====
P	Team	Pld	W	D	L	GF	GA	BP	Pts
1	Aberdeen	18	11	3	4	63	19	6	25
2	East Fife	18	10	3	5	39	29	5	23
3	Rangers 'A'	18	10	3	5	41	25	4	23
4	Dunfermline Athletic	18	9	3	6	38	35	4	21
5	Dundee	18	10	0	8	49	36	3	20
6	Dundee United	18	7	2	9	31	54	3	16
7	Raith Rovers	18	7	1	10	39	47	3	15
8	Arbroath	18	5	4	9	28	43	4	14
9	Heart of Midlothian 'A'	18	5	4	9	27	42	4	14
10	Falkirk 'A'	18	4	1	13	32	57	2	9

BP – 3 points were awarded for an away win, 2 points for an away draw

== See also ==
- Association football during World War II
