= Southern League Cup (Scotland) =

1940s Scottish football competition

- Sport: Football
- Founded: 1940
- Folded: 1946
- No. of teams: 16
- Country: Scotland
- Last champion: Aberdeen
- Most titles: Rangers (4)
- Related competitions: Southern League; Scottish League Cup

The Southern League Cup was a regional Scottish football competition held during the Second World War, due to the suspension of national competitions. Held between 1940 and 1946, the competition involved all teams from the Southern League and was played as four groups of four with the group winners forming the semi-finals. In the final season, due to additional teams, the competition doubled in size with quarter-finals for the eight group winners.

Rangers dominated the tournament, appearing in every final and winning four out of the six. On two occasions, the winners were decided by which team had more corner kicks after the finals ended in draws.

The Southern League Cup helped to contribute to the present-day Scottish League Cup: it was merged with its North Eastern equivalent in the 1945–46 season, with the nationwide competition proving popular (the final, won by Aberdeen, attracted a crowd of crowd of 135,000 at Hampden Park). It was thus continued on those lines on an official basis from then on.

As the war ended, regular league football returned in 1946, with the regional leagues and cups disbanded.

== Tournaments ==
Season	Winner	Score	Runner-up	Venue
1940–41	Rangers	4 – 2 (rep.)	Heart of Midlothian	Hampden Park
1941–42	Rangers	1 – 0	Morton	Hampden Park
1942–43	Rangers	1 – 1 (11 – 3 corners)	Falkirk	Hampden Park
1943–44	Hibernian	0 – 0 (6 – 5 corners)	Rangers	Hampden Park
1944–45	Rangers	2 – 1	Motherwell	Hampden Park
1945–46	Aberdeen	3 – 2	Rangers	Hampden Park
