= Southern Football League (Scotland) =

Scottish regional football league during World War II

- Sport: Football
- Founded: 1940
- Folded: 1946
- No. of teams: 16 (32 in 1945–46)
- Country: Scotland
- Last champion: Rangers
- Most titles: Rangers (6)
- Related competitions: Southern League Cup; Summer Cup

The Southern Football League was a Scottish regional football competition held during World War II, due to the suspension of the Scottish Football League (an interim nationwide War Emergency League was played in the 1939–40 season). Held between 1940 and 1946, the competition was played as a single division until the introduction of teams in 1945–46 from the disbanded North Eastern League, forcing the addition of a second division. Rangers dominated the competition, winning every tournament. The league also ran two cup competitions: the Southern League Cup and the Summer Cup. As the war ended, regular league football returned in 1946, with the regional leagues disbanded.

== Tournaments ==
Season	Winner	Runner-up
1940–41	Rangers	Clyde
1941–42	Rangers	Hibernian
1942–43	Rangers	Morton
1943–44	Rangers	Celtic
1944–45	Rangers	Celtic
1945–46	Rangers	Hibernian
