= 1941–42 Dumbarton F.C. season =

Dumbarton
1941–1942 season
- Stadium: Boghead Park, Dumbarton
- Scottish Southern League: 12th
- Summer Cup: First Round
- League Cup South: Prelims
- Top goalscorer: League: Felix McGrogan (14); All: Felix McGrogan (14)
- Highest home attendance: 8,000
- Lowest home attendance: 2,000
- Average home league attendance: 4,200

The 1941–42 season was the third Scottish football season in which Dumbarton competed in regional football during World War II.

== Scottish Southern League ==
The second season of the Scottish Southern League saw Dumbarton continue to improve their performances by finished 12th out of 16 with 26 points - 32 behind champions Rangers. Boosted by player 'guest' appearances Dumbarton could just about compete on an equal footing with the 'bigger' clubs.

9 August 1941 League	Dumbarton	3–5	Airdrie	Boghead Park
	Jeffrey 8'; Rodger 16'; Farr 30'		Flavell 2', 85'; Mooney 65', 72'; Stark 69'	Attendance: 4,000; Referee: M C Hutton

16 August 1941 League	Third Lanark	4–3	Dumbarton	Cathkin Park
	Glassey 7', 18', 79'; Jones 65'		Rodgers 5'; McBride 40'; Jeffrey 46'	Attendance: 3,500

23 August 1941 League	Dumbarton	2–5	Celtic	Boghead Park
	McBride 9', 57'		Delaney 20', 68', 82'; McDonald, J 58'; Divers 62'	Attendance: 8,000; Referee: J M Martin

30 August 1941 League	St Mirren	2–4	Dumbarton	Love Street (stadium)
	Stenhouse 38'; Linwood 50'		McGrogan 52'; Jeffrey 53', 64'; Ross 66' (pen.)	Attendance: 5,000; Referee: W Webb

6 September 1941 League	Dumbarton	0–1	Falkirk	Boghead Park
			Widdowfield 84'	Attendance: 2,500; Referee: P Craigmyle

13 September 1941 League	Hibernian	4–0	Dumbarton	Easter Road Stadium
	Finnegan 27'; Nutley 44', 55', 62'			Attendance: 6,000; Referee: C E Faultless

20 September 1941 League	Dumbarton	2–7	Partick Thistle	Boghead Park
	Milne 6'; McAloon 73'		Sharp 11', 30'; Newall 24', 34', 68', 86'; Gourlay 25'	Attendance: 2,500; Referee: J Horsburgh

27 September 1941 League	Motherwell	2–3	Dumbarton	Fir Park
	Mathie 78'; Ellis 82' (pen.)		Jeffrey 26', 79'; Dougall 87'	Attendance: 2,000; Referee: H Watson

4 October 1941 League	Dumbarton	3–1	Morton	Boghead Park
	Ross 43'; McGrogan 57'; McAloon 88'		Robertson 68'	Attendance: 3,000; Referee: J Horsburgh

11 October 1941 League	Rangers	7–0	Dumbarton	Ibrox Park
	Shaw 4'; Marshall 19'; Thomson 38' (pen.), 57' (pen.); McIntosh 43'; Gillick 72', 76'			Attendance: 8,000; Referee: R C Scott

18 October 1941 League	Dumbarton	5–2	Albion Rovers	Boghead Park
	Rodger 20', 80'; McAloon 35'; Milne 65'; Jeffrey 72'		Dunsmore 17'; Bell 60'	Attendance: 3,000; Referee: M C Dale

25 October 1941 League	Hearts	7–4	Dumbarton	Tynecastle Stadium
	Smith 3', 16'; Gillies 27'; Hamilton 55', 63'; Walker 68', 75' (pen.)		Milne 8', 81', 85'; Rodger 63'	Attendance: 5,000; Referee: R Smellie

1 November 1941 League	Dumbarton	3–2	Hamilton	Boghead Park
	McGrogan 5'; Rodger 26'; Jeffrey 89'		Maves 12', 15'	Attendance: 2,500; Referee: R G Benzie

8 November 1941 League	Dumbarton	6–0	Clyde	Boghead Park
	McGrogan 15', 40'; Rodger 50'; Dougall 57'; McAloon 65'; Milne 88'			Attendance: 4,000; Referee: J Thomson

15 November 1941 League	Queen's Park	1–2	Dumbarton	Hampden Park
	Mackintosh 7'		Ross 29', 73'	Attendance: 2,000; Referee: J Thomson

22 November 1941 League	Airdrie	3–2	Dumbarton	Broomfield Park
	Junior 1'; Flavell 18', 83'		McGrogan 12'; Rodger 89'	Attendance: 3,000; Referee: J M Martin

29 November 1941 League	Dumbarton	1–5	Third Lanark	Boghead Park
	Ross 52'		Newman 7'; Connor 26', 55'; Law 49', 82'	Attendance: 2,500; Referee: J M Martin

6 December 1941 League	Celtic	4–2	Dumbarton	Celtic Park
	Lynch 14'; Conway 36'; Delaney 58'; McLaughlin 65' (pen.)		Jeffrey 28'; McAloon 77'	Attendance: 3,000; Referee: J Horsburgh

13 December 1941 League	Dumbarton	5–1	St Mirren	Boghead Park
	Gould 5', 15', 71'; McAloon 58'; McGrogan 80'		Brady 33'	Attendance: 2,000; Referee: J M Martin

20 December 1941 League	Partick Thistle	4–3	Dumbarton	Firhill Park
	Newall 25', 27', 35', 53'		Gould 26', 69'; Hickie 89' (pen.)	Attendance: 5,000; Referee: J Thomson

27 December 1941 League	Dumbarton	2–1	Motherwell	Boghead Park
	Milne 16'; Gould 21'		Wales 75'	Attendance: 3,000; Referee: M C Dale

1 January 1942 League	Falkirk	3–1	Dumbarton	Brockville Park
	Rooney 3', 60'; Dawson 5'		Hickie 61' (pen.)	Referee: M Hutton

3 January 1942 League	Dumbarton	2–1	Hibernian	Boghead Park
	McGrogan 5'; Gould 8'		Combe 3'	Attendance: 2,500; Referee: J B Smillie

10 January 1942 League	Morton	2–2	Dumbarton	Cappielow Park
	Steele 10'; Hunter 55'		Gould 12', 58'	Attendance: 4,000; Referee: J R Boyd

17 January 1942 League	Dumbarton	3–3	Rangers	Boghead Park
	Jeffrey 25'; McAloon 55'; McGrogan 65'		Marshall 5'; Smith 15'; Hickie 89' (o.g.)	Attendance: 6,000; Referee: R C Scott

31 January 1942 League	Dumbarton	3–3	Hearts	Boghead Park
	Gould 23'; McGrogan 54', 89'		Dougan 34'; Christie 44'; Smith, G 73'	Attendance: 4,000; Referee: W J Robertson

14 February 1942 League	Clyde	5–4	Dumbarton	Shawfield Stadium
	Wallace 1'; Mills 37'; Beaton 55'; Williams 59', 84'		McGrogan 22'; Henderson 32'; Gould 39'; McAloon 72'	Attendance: 6,000; Referee: J Thomson

21 February 1942 League	Dumbarton	2–1	Queen's Park	Boghead Park
	Hepburn 67'; McAloon 88'		Wilkie 62'	Attendance: 4,000; Referee: J B Smillie

2 May 1942 League	Albion Rovers	0–0	Dumbarton	Cliftonhill
				Attendance: 1,500; Referee: M C Hutton

9 May 1942 League	Hamilton	4–1	Dumbarton	Douglas Park
	Herd 9'; Newman 13', 34', 87'		Henderson 89'	Attendance: 1,500

== League Cup South ==
For the second successive season, Dumbarton failed to qualify from the sectional games.

28 February 1942 Group A	Morton	4–1	Dumbarton	Cappielow Park
	Hunter 1', 10', 52', 83'		Hepburn 57'	Attendance: 4,000; Referee: P Craigmyle

14 March 1942 Group A	St Mirren	1–3	Dumbarton	Love Street (stadium)
	Drinkwater 73'		Gould 28'; McGrogan 56', 88'	Attendance: 4,000; Referee: M C Hutton

21 March 1942 Group A	Dumbarton	3–4	Morton	Boghead Park
	Gould 5', 72', 85'		Cumner 13', 75'; Kelly 66'; Wilkie 86'	Attendance: 6,000; Referee: J Thomson

28 March 1942 Group A	Falkirk	5–0	Dumbarton	Brockville Park
	Stewart 15', 89'; Paterson 18', 25'; McPhee 74' (pen.)			Attendance: 3,000; Referee: J Horsburgh

4 April 1942 Group A	Dumbarton	4–2	St Mirren	Boghead Park
	Ross 37' (pen.), 44'; McGrogan 55'; Gould 80'		Linwood 1', 27'	Attendance: 2,000; Referee: W McCulloch

11 April 1942 Group A	Dumbarton	3–3	Falkirk	Boghead Park
	Ross 30', 80'; Gould 85'		Paterson 20'; Carruthers 65'; Rooney 83'	Attendance: 2,500; Referee: M Hutton

== Summer Cup ==
Dumbarton fell at the first hurdle to Motherwell.

30 May 1942 Cup R1(1)	Dumbarton	1–0	Motherwell	Boghead Park
	McGrogan 65'			Attendance: 3,500; Referee: W J Robertson

6 June 1942 Cup R1(2)	Motherwell	4–2 (4–3 agg.)	Dumbarton	Fir Park
	Reid 34', 39'; Bremner 48', 74'		Reid 17'; McAloon 33'	Attendance: 3,000; Referee: W Robertson

== Player statistics ==
No.	Pos	Nat	Player	Total		Southern Division		Summer Cup		League Cup	
No.	Pos	Nat	Player	Apps	Goals	Apps	Goals	Apps	Goals	Apps	Goals
	GK	(Scotland) SCO	James Hornall	11	0	3	0	2	0	6	0
	GK	(South Africa) RSA	Patrick Kelly	10	0	10	0	0	0	0	0
	GK	(Scotland) SCO	Jock Wallace	17	0	17	0	0	0	0	0
	DF	(Scotland) SCO	Andy Cheyne	1	0	0	0	1	0	0	0
	DF	(Scotland) SCO	Jimmy Hickie	33	2	27	2	0	0	6	0
	DF	(Scotland) SCO	Willie Savage	27	0	19	0	2	0	6	0
	DF	(Scotland) SCO	William Smith	9	0	8	0	1	0	0	0
	MF	(Scotland) SCO	Robert Chalmers	1	0	1	0	0	0	0	0
	MF	(Scotland) SCO	David Corbett	7	0	7	0	0	0	0	0
	MF	(Scotland) SCO	Robert Dougall	26	2	18	2	2	0	6	0
	MF	(Scotland) SCO	Charlie Gavin	26	0	23	0	0	0	3	0
	MF	(Scotland) SCO	George Henderson	10	2	9	2	0	0	1	0
	MF	(Scotland) SCO	George Urquhart	35	0	28	0	2	0	5	0
	FW	(Scotland) SCO	Boyd	1	0	1	0	0	0	0	0
	FW	(Scotland) SCO	Edward Currie	2	0	2	0	0	0	0	0
	FW	(Scotland) SCO	Andrew Farr	3	1	3	1	0	0	0	0
	FW	(Scotland) SCO	Johnny Gould	20	17	12	11	2	0	6	6
	FW	(Scotland) SCO	John Hepburn	13	2	5	1	2	0	6	1
	FW	(Scotland) SCO	George Jeffrey	21	10	21	10	0	0	0	0
	FW	(Scotland) SCO	Johnny Mathers	5	0	5	0	0	0	0	0
	FW	(Scotland) SCO	Gerry McAloon	28	10	22	9	1	1	5	0
	FW	(Scotland) SCO	John McBride	4	4	4	4	0	0	0	0
	FW	(Scotland) SCO	Felix McGrogan	30	18	22	14	2	1	6	3
	FW	(Scotland) SCO	Jackie Milne	28	6	24	6	2	0	2	0
	FW	(Scotland) SCO	Vince Pritchard	7	0	1	0	1	0	5	0
	FW	(Scotland) SCO	Willie Reid	4	1	2	0	2	1	0	0
	FW	(Scotland) SCO	Fally Rodger	16	7	16	7	0	0	0	0
	FW	(Scotland) SCO	Sammy Ross	22	9	19	5	0	0	3	4
	FW	(Scotland) SCO	Trialist	1	0	1	0	0	0	0	0

=== Transfers ===
==== Players in ====
Player	From	Date
(Scotland) Jock Wallace	(England) Blackpool (guest)	19 Sep 1940
(Scotland) Felix McGrogan	(Scotland) Kilmarnock (guest)	21 May 1941
(Scotland) William Savage	(Scotland) Queen of the South (guest)	24 May 1941
(Scotland) George Urquhart	(Scotland) Arbroath (guest)	28 May 1941
(Scotland) Jimmy Hickie	(Scotland) Clyde (guest)	4 Jun 1941
(Scotland) Fally Rodger	(England) Northampton Town (guest)	4 Jun 1941
(Scotland) Sammy Ross	(Scotland) Falkirk (guest)	4 Jun 1941
(Scotland) Charles Gavin	(Scotland) Arbroath (guest)	28 Jul 1941
(Scotland) David Corbett	(Scotland) St Mirren	30 Jul 1940
(Scotland) Robert Dougall	(England) Reading (guest)	4 Aug 1941
(Scotland) Andrew Farr	(England) Arsenal (guest)	7 Aug 1941
(Scotland) Jackie Milne	(England) Middlesbrough (guest)	14 Aug 1941
(Scotland) Johnny Mathers	(Scotland) St Johnstone (guest)	28 Aug 1941
(Scotland) Jerry McAloon	(England) Wolverhampton Wanderers (guest)	24 Sep 1941
(Scotland) William Smith	(Scotland) Kirkintilloch Rob Roy	30 Oct 1940
(Scotland) Patrick Kelly	(Scotland) Aberdeen (guest)	3 Dec 1941
(Scotland) Johnny Gould	(Scotland) Albion Rovers F.C. (guest)	13 Dec 1941
(Scotland) John Hepburn	(Scotland) Arthurlie	26 Jan 1941
(Scotland) James Hornall	(Scotland) Shawfield Juniors	25 Feb 1941
(Scotland) A Vincent Pritchard	(Scotland) Maryhill Harp	11 Mar 1941
(Scotland) Robert Chalmers	(Scotland) Carluke Rovers	
(Scotland) Andy Cheyne	(Scotland) Motherwell (guest)	
(Scotland) Edward Currie	(Scotland) Carluke Rovers	
(Scotland) William Reid	(Scotland) Cowdenbeath (guest)	

==== Players out ====
Player	To	Date
(Scotland) George Jeffrey	(Scotland) Aberdeen (loan)	

In addition John Casey and Geoffrey Lockwood both played their last games in Dumbarton 'colours'.
