= 1942–43 Dumbarton F.C. season =

Dumbarton
1942–1943 season
- Stadium: Boghead Park, Dumbarton
- Scottish Southern League: 10th
- Summer Cup: Second Round
- League Cup South: Prelims
- Top goalscorer: League: Johnny Gould (19); All: Johnny Gould (19)

The 1942–43 season was the fourth Scottish football season in which Dumbarton competed in regional football during World War II.

== Scottish Southern League ==
Each season in which Dumbarton had played in the Scottish Southern League saw an improvement in results and the third season was no different, by finishing 10th out of 16 with 28 points - 22 behind champions Rangers. The positive league results included a first home league win over Celtic since 1892.

8 August 1942 League	Celtic	2–2	Dumbarton	Celtic Park
	McAulay 13'; Delaney 85'		Dougall 15' (pen.); Gould 80'	Attendance: 5,000; Referee: J R Boyd

15 August 1942 League	Dumbarton	4–0	St Mirren	Boghead Park
	Parlane, J 12'; Gould 27', 72'; Reid 57'			Attendance: 4,000

22 August 1942 League	Partick Thistle	2–1	Dumbarton	Firhill Park
	Gourlay 15', 44'		Dougall 73' (pen.)	Attendance: 5,000; Referee: M C Dale

29 August 1942 League	Dumbarton	1–4	Hibernian	Boghead Park
	McGrogan 70'		Cuthbertson 23', 37'; Anderson 35'; Williams 80'	Attendance: 6,500

5 September 1942 League	Falkirk	5–4	Dumbarton	Brockville Park
	Campbell 8', 43', 50'; Fitzsimmons 15'; Ogilvie 40'		Gould 7', 70'; McGrogan 48', 72'	Attendance: 4,000; Referee: A Braidwood

12 September 1942 League	Dumbarton	5–3	Motherwell	Boghead Park
	Pritchard 19', 83'; Reid 56', 84'; Gould 53'		Main 16', 89'; Mathie 29'	Attendance: 4,000; Referee: R Calder

19 September 1942 League	Morton	1–3	Dumbarton	Cappielow Park
	Divers 32'		Pritchard 39'; Hepburn 42'; Reid 60'	Attendance: 12,000; Referee: J M Martin

26 September 1942 League	Dumbarton	1–2	Rangers	Boghead Park
	Pritchard 52'		Duncanson 48'; Gillick 85'	Attendance: 10,000; Referee: J Boyd

3 October 1942 League	Albion Rovers	3–4	Dumbarton	Cliftonhill
	Murphy 19'; Wilkie 34'; Bell 44'		Gould 11', 35'; Milne 56'; Pritchard 88'	Attendance: 3,000; Referee: W Davidson

10 October 1942 League	Dumbarton	2–2	Hearts	Boghead Park
	Gould 11'; Pritchard 38'		McKillop 16'; Miller 66'	Attendance: 3,000

17 October 1942 League	Hamilton	2–1	Dumbarton	Douglas Park
	Wilson 5'; Barraclough 62'		Gould 26'	Attendance: 2,000; Referee: J Godfrey

24 October 1942 League	Clyde	6–2	Dumbarton	Shawfield Stadium
	Wallace 9', 28', 50'; Mills 25'; Taylor 57'; Johnstone 68'		Gould 5', 70'	Attendance: 4,000

31 October 1942 League	Dumbarton	3–3	Queen's Park	Boghead Park
	Reid 10'; Hepburn 24'; Henderson 70'		Kyle 40', 51'; Dixon 87'	Attendance: 4,000; Referee: M C Dale

7 November 1942 League	Airdrie	1–0	Dumbarton	Broomfield Park
	Flavell 84'			Attendance: 3,000

14 November 1942 League	Dumbarton	5–3	Third Lanark	Boghead Park
	McGrogan 20'; Gould 34'; McAloon 46', 76'; Hepburn 54'		Proudfood 32'; McLean 39'; Connor 62'	Attendance: 3,000; Referee: P Craigmyle

21 November 1942 League	Dumbarton	4–2	Celtic	Boghead Park
	McGrogan 17'; McAloon 19', 80'; Torrance 75'		McLaughlin 50'; McGowan 87'	Attendance: 7,000

28 November 1942 League	St Mirren	5–2	Dumbarton	Love Street (stadium)
	Linwood 2', 44', 65'; Stenhouse 35'; Deakin 88'		McAloon 50', 73'	Attendance: 5,000; Referee: J Horsburgh

5 December 1942 League	Dumbarton	4–1	Partick Thistle	Boghead Park
	McGrogan 15', 82'; Torrance 40'; McAloon 83'		Peat 88'	Attendance: 2,500

12 December 1942 League	Hibernian	4–1	Dumbarton	Easter Road Stadium
	Smith, G 26', 78'; Baxter 41'; Cuthbertson 86'		McAloon 30'	Attendance: 7,000; Referee: J Jackson

19 December 1942 League	Dumbarton	0–3	Morton	Boghead Park
			Garth 43'; Adams 70'; Crum 83'	Attendance: 2,000

26 December 1942 League	Motherwell	0–2	Dumbarton	Fir Park
			Alsop 84'; McAloon 87'	Attendance: 3,000; Referee: W Webb

1 January 1943 League	Dumbarton	2–2	Falkirk	Boghead Park
	Dougal 15' (pen.); McGrogan 50'		Kane; Fitzsimmons	Referee: J S Cox

2 January 1943 League	Dumbarton	6–1	Albion Rovers	Boghead Park
	Gould 4', 63'; McAloon 25', 39'; Hepburn 32'; Torrance 53'		Findlay 26'	Attendance: 2,500

9 January 1943 League	Rangers	1–0	Dumbarton	Ibrox Park
	Duncanson 44'			Attendance: 7,000; Referee: J Godfrey

16 January 1943 League	Hearts	0–1	Dumbarton	Tynecastle Stadium
			Torrance 82'	Attendance: 5,000

23 January 1943 League	Dumbarton	2–2	Hamilton	Boghead Park
	Dougall 22' (pen.); Pritchard 44'		Wilson 14'; Lowe 19'	Attendance: 3,000; Referee: R G Benzie

30 January 1943 League	Dumbarton	6–2	Clyde	Boghead Park
	Gould 23', 48', 57'; Pritchard 46'; Hepburn 49'; Dougall 73' (pen.)		Agnew 12'; Johnstone 55'	Attendance: 3,000

6 February 1943 League	Queen's Park	4–2	Dumbarton	Hampden Park
	Kyle 2'; Aitken 10', 71'; Liddell 64'		Hepburn 18'; Dougall 84' (pen.)	Attendance: 4,000; Referee: J Jackson

13 February 1943 League	Dumbarton	3–3	Airdrie	Boghead Park
	McAloon 17', 88'; Pritchard 77'		Gallacher 20'; Divers 41', 75'	Attendance: 2,500

20 February 1943 League	Third Lanark	7–3	Dumbarton	Cathkin Park
	Connor 17', 32', 60'; Proudfoot 34'; Watson 38'; Newman 42'; Cairns 64'		McCormack 53'; Gould 55', 77'	Attendance: 1,500; Referee: R Calder

== League Cup South ==
Dumbarton continued to find it difficult to find success in the League Cup South where again they failed to negotiate the sectional stage of the competition - gaining just a single draw from six matches.

27 February 1943 Group A	Albion Rovers	2–1	Dumbarton	Cliftonhill Stadium
	Lyon 44', 68'		Hepburn 87'	Attendance: 2,000; Referee: P Craigmyle

6 March 1943 Group A	Dumbarton	3–3	Morton	Boghead Park
	McGrogan 31', 60', 89'		Crum 18', 30'; Kelly 50'	Attendance: 5,000; Referee: J Cameron

13 March 1943 Group A	Falkirk	7–2	Dumbarton	Brockville Park
	Inglis 7', 58', 68'; Dawson 39'; Ogilvie 42', 73'; Rice 70'		McAloon 79'; McGrogan 83'	Attendance: 3,000

20 March 1943 Group A	Dumbarton	1–2	Albion Rovers	Boghead Park
	Torrance 60'		Lyon 37'; Mudie 40'	Attendance: 2,500; Referee: C R Bines

27 March 1943 Group A	Morton	5–2	Dumbarton	Cappielow Park
	Garth 26'; Kelly 30'; Simpson 32', 37', 83'		Torrance 11'; Hepburn 59'	Attendance: 6,000

3 April 1943 Group A	Dumbarton	1–3	Falkirk	Boghead Park
	Stead 78' (pen.)		Inglis 1', 40'; Stewart 80' (pen.)	Attendance: 3,500; Referee: M C Dale

== Summer Cup ==
Dumbarton reached the second round of the Summer Cup before losing to eventual winners St Mirren.

29 May 1943 Cup 1(1)	Dumbarton	6–2	Hamilton	Boghead Park
	Stead 30', 75'; Hepburn 51'; Reid 80'; Torrance 85', 87'		Wilson 20', 45'	Attendance: 2,000; Referee: W Webb

5 June 1943 Cup 1(2)	Hamilton	2–1 (4–7 agg.)	Dumbarton	Douglas Park
	Whiteford 72'; Duffy 73'		McCormack 57'	Attendance: 2,000

12 June 1943 Cup 2(1)	St Mirren	6–3	Dumbarton	Love Street (stadium)
	Stenhouse 7'; Linwood 12', 23', 35', 42', 51'		Torrance 54'; Pritchard 65', 80'	Attendance: 2,500

19 June 1943 Cup 2(2)	Dumbarton	1–1 (4–7 agg.)	St Mirren	Boghead Park
	Pritchard 12'		Linwood 10'	Attendance: 5,000

== Friendly ==
10 April 1943 Friendly	Wishaw	2–2	Dumbarton	Wishaw
	Goal		Goal

== Player statistics ==
No.	Pos	Nat	Player	Total		Southern Division		Summer Cup		League Cup	
No.	Pos	Nat	Player	Apps	Goals	Apps	Goals	Apps	Goals	Apps	Goals
	GK	(England) ENG	Billy Bly	7	0	7	0	0	0	0	0
	GK	(Scotland) SCO	James Hornall	13	0	13	0	0	0	0	0
	GK	(Scotland) SCO	David Watson	19	0	9	0	4	0	6	0
	DF	(Scotland) SCO	Andy Cheyne	38	0	30	0	4	0	4	0
	DF	(Scotland) SCO	John Morgan	3	0	1	0	0	0	2	0
	DF	(Scotland) SCO	James Mulvaney	8	0	1	0	4	0	3	0
	DF	(Scotland) SCO	Willie Savage	32	0	29	0	0	0	3	0
	MF	(Scotland) SCO	John Craig	6	0	0	0	3	0	3	0
	MF	(Scotland) SCO	Robert Dougall	38	6	29	6	4	0	5	0
	MF	(Scotland) SCO	John Easdale	1	0	1	0	0	0	0	0
	MF	(Scotland) SCO	Hall	1	0	0	0	1	0	0	0
	MF	(Scotland) SCO	Douglas McBain	1	0	0	0	1	0	0	0
	MF	(Scotland) SCO	Jackie Milne	27	1	21	1	3	0	3	0
	MF	(Scotland) SCO	William Smith	2	0	2	0	0	0	0	0
	MF	(Scotland) SCO	George Urquhart	16	0	16	0	0	0	0	0
	FW	(England) ENG	Gilbert Alsop	2	1	2	1	0	0	0	0
	FW	(Scotland) SCO	Johnny Gould	28	19	25	19	0	0	3	0
	FW	(Scotland) SCO	George Henderson	2	1	2	1	0	0	0	0
	FW	(Scotland) SCO	John Hepburn	39	9	29	6	4	1	6	2
	FW	(Scotland) SCO	John Honeyman	1	0	1	0	0	0	0	0
	FW	(Scotland) SCO	George Jeffrey	1	0	1	0	0	0	0	0
	FW	(Scotland) SCO	Gerry McAloon	15	13	12	12	0	0	3	1
	FW	(Scotland) SCO	Murdoch McCormack	9	2	5	1	4	1	0	0
	FW	(Scotland) SCO	Felix McGrogan	29	13	24	9	0	0	5	4
	FW	(Scotland) SCO	Jimmy Parlane	3	1	3	1	0	0	0	0
	FW	(Scotland) SCO	Vince Pritchard	28	12	21	9	2	3	5	0
	FW	(Scotland) SCO	Willie Reid	37	6	27	5	4	1	6	0
	FW	(Scotland) SCO	Angus Stead	5	3	0	0	2	2	3	1
	FW	(Scotland) SCO	Robert Torrance	24	9	14	4	4	3	6	2
	FW	(Scotland) SCO	Watson	2	0	2	0	0	0	0	0
	FW	(Scotland) SCO	Trialists	3	0	3	0	0	0	0	0

=== Transfers ===
==== Players in ====
Player	From	Date
(Scotland) Willie Savage	(Scotland) Queen of the South (guest)	14 May 1942
(Scotland) Andy Cheyne	(Scotland) Motherwell	23 May 1942
(Scotland) Willie Reid	(England) Cowdenbeath (guest)	1 Jun 1942
(Scotland) Jimmy Parlane	(England) Manchester City (guest)	12 Aug 1942
(Scotland) John Morgan	(Scotland) Vale of Leven	3 Sep 1942
(Scotland) Alexander Filshie	(Scotland)	2 Oct 1942
(Scotland) Douglas McBain	(Scotland) Blantyre Engineering	22 Oct 1942
(Scotland) Murdoch McCormack	(Scotland) Hibernian	22 Oct 1942
(Scotland) Andrew Boyd	(Scotland) Amateur	24 Oct 1942
(Scotland) Robert Torrance	(Scotland) Wishaw	10 Nov 1942
(Scotland) David Watson	(Scotland) Benburb	23 Dec 1942
(Scotland) James Mulvaney	(Scotland) Newarthill Hearts	9 Jan 1943
(Scotland) John Craig	(Scotland) Wishaw	16 Jan 1943
(Scotland) Angus Stead	(Scotland) Partick Thistle	17 Mar 1943
(England) Gilbert Alsop	(England) Walsall (guest)	
(England) William Bly	(England) Hull City (guest)	
(Scotland) John Easdale	(England) Liverpool (guest)	
(Scotland) John Honeyman	(Scotland) Maryhill Harp	
(Scotland) Jackie Milne	(England) Middlesbrough	
(Scotland) George Urquhart	(Scotland) Arbroath	

==== Players out ====
Player	To	Date
(Scotland) William Smith	(Scotland) Released	19 Jan 1943
(Scotland) Felix McGrogan	(Scotland) Third Lanark	
(Scotland) Robert Chalmers	(Scotland) Dundee United	
(Scotland) Edward Currie	(Scotland) St Mirren	

In addition John McBride and David Corbett both played their last games in Dumbarton 'colours'.

== Reserve team ==
For the first time since 1922, Dumbarton played a reserve team, and found a measure of success.

While they suffered a second round exit to Airdrie in the Scottish Second XI Cup, Dumbarton finishing as runners-up in the First Series of the Glasgow & District Reserve League and reached the final of the Glasgow & District Reserve League Cup before losing out to Motherwell.
