= 1938 Scottish Cup final =

1938 Scottish Cup Final
- Event: 1937–38 Scottish Cup
East Fife	Kilmarnock
1	1
East Fife	Kilmarnock
- Date: 23 April 1938
- Venue: Hampden Park, Glasgow
- Attendance: 80,091

Replay
East Fife	Kilmarnock
4	2
- Date: 27 April 1938
- Venue: Hampden Park, Glasgow
- Attendance: 92,716

The 1938 Scottish Cup Final was played on 23 April 1938 at Hampden Park in Glasgow and was the final of the 60th Scottish Cup. East Fife and Kilmarnock contested the match. Following a 1–1 draw, the match was replayed on 27 April 1938, at the end of normal time the score was 2–2. East Fife, managed by David McLean, then went on to win the match 4–2 to win their only Scottish Cup.

== Match details ==
=== First match ===
23 April 1938

East Fife	1 – 1	Kilmarnock
McLeod 17'		McAvoy 25'

Hampden Park, Glasgow
Attendance: 80,091

==== Teams ====
East Fife:
GK	(Scotland) Jimmy Milton
RB	(Scotland) Willie Laird
LB	(Scotland) Bobby Tait
RH	(Scotland) Davie Russell
CH	(Scotland) John Sneddon
LH	(Scotland) Andy Herd
OR	(Scotland) Tommy Adams
IR	(Scotland) Eddie McLeod 17'
CF	(Scotland) Bobby McCartney
IL	(Scotland) Larry Miller
OL	(Scotland) Danny McKerrell
Manager:
(Scotland) David McLean

Kilmarnock:
GK	(Scotland) John Hunter
RB	(Scotland) Andy Fyfe
LB	(Scotland) Freddie Milloy
RH	(Scotland) George Robertson
CH	(Scotland) John Stewart
LH	(Scotland) Sammy Ross
OR	(Scotland) Benny Thomson
IR	(Scotland) George Reid
CF	(Scotland) Allan Collins
IL	(Scotland) Doug McAvoy 25'
OL	(Scotland) Felix McGrogan
Manager:
(Scotland) Jimmy McGrory

=== Replay ===
27 April 1938

East Fife	4 – 2 (a.e.t.)	Kilmarnock
McKerrell 15' 114'; McLeod 57'; Miller 110'		Thomson 20'; McGrogan 27'

Hampden Park, Glasgow
Attendance: 92,716

==== Teams ====
East Fife:
GK	(Scotland) Jimmy Milton
RB	(Scotland) Willie Laird
LB	(Scotland) Bobby Tait
RH	(Scotland) Davie Russell
CH	(Scotland) John Sneddon
LH	(Scotland) John Harvey
OR	(Scotland) Tommy Adams
IR	(Scotland) Eddie McLeod 57'
CF	(Scotland) Bobby McCartney
IL	(Scotland) Larry Miller 110'
OL	(Scotland) Danny McKerrell 15' 114'
Manager:
(Scotland) David McLean

Kilmarnock:
GK	(Scotland) John Hunter
LB	(Scotland) Andy Fyfe
LB	(Scotland) Freddie Milloy
RH	(Scotland) George Robertson
CH	(Scotland) John Stewart
LH	(Scotland) Sammy Ross
OR	(Scotland) Benny Thomson 20'
IR	(Scotland) George Reid
CF	(Scotland) Allan Collins
OL	(Scotland) Doug McAvoy
OR	(Scotland) Felix McGrogan 27'
Manager:
(Scotland) Jimmy McGrory
