= Andrew Fyfe =

Andrew or Andy Fyfe may refer to:

- Andrew Fyfe (anatomist) (1754–1824) Scottish anatomist
- Andrew Fyfe (cartoonist) (born 1966), Australian cartoonist and satirist
- Andrew Fyfe (chemist) (1792–1861), Scottish surgeon and chemist
- Andy Fyfe (footballer, born 1913), Scottish footballer
- Andy Fyfe (footballer, born 1898), Scottish footballer
