= Benjamin Thompson (disambiguation) =

Benjamin Thompson (1753–1814) was an American-born British physicist and inventor.

Benjamin Thompson may also refer to:

== Entertainment ==
- Ben Thompson (actor) (born 1992), in Coronation Street
- Benjamin Thompson (dramatist) (1776?—1816), English dramatist
- Ben Thompson, author of Badass and the book series Guts & Glory

== Politics ==
- Benjamin Thompson (politician) (1798–1852), US congressman from Massachusetts
- Bennie Thompson (born 1948), US congressman from Mississippi
- Ben Thompson (Canadian politician) (1924–1998), lawyer and Progressive Conservative party member

== Sports ==
- Ben Thompson (Australian footballer, born 1973), Australian rules footballer for St Kilda
- Ben Thompson (Australian footballer, born 1978), Australian rules footballer for Carlton
- Ben Thompson (footballer, born 1995) (born 1995), English footballer
- Ben Thompson (footballer, born 2002), Welsh footballer
- Benjamin Thompson (cricketer) (born 1980), former English cricketer

== Other ==
- Benjamin Thompson (farmer) (1806–1890), main benefactor of the University of New Hampshire
- Ben Thompson (lawman) (1843–1884), Texas gunfighter and marshal of Austin
- Benjamin Thompson (architect) (1918–2002), American architect and founder of Design Research
- Ben Thompson (analyst), American business, technology, and media analyst

== See also ==
- Ben Thomson (disambiguation)
- Benny Thomson (1913–1940), British footballer
- Samuel Benjamin Thompson, reconstruction era African American politician in South Carolina
