= 1941–42 Heart of Midlothian F.C. season =

Heart of Midlothian
1941–42 season
- Manager: David McLean
- Stadium: Tynecastle Park
- Southern League: 7th
- Summer Cup: Round 1
- Southern League Cup: Group Stage

During the 1941–42 season Hearts competed in the Southern League, the Summer Cup, the Southern League Cup and the East of Scotland Shield.

== Fixtures ==
=== Friendlies ===
25 April 1942 Friendly	Newcastle United	2–0	Hearts	St James' Park

=== Rosebery Charity Cup ===
23 May 1942 Final	Hearts	1–1 (Hearts win on coin toss)	Hibernian	Tynecastle Park
	Goal

=== City of Edinburgh Cup ===
2 August 1941 Final	Hearts	0–1	Arsenal	Tynecastle Park
	Goal

=== Wilson Cup ===
13 August 1941 Final	Hibernian	0–1	Hearts	Easter Road
	Goal

=== East of Scotland Shield ===
9 May 1942 Semi-Final	Hearts	10–3	Leith Athletic	Tynecastle Park

16 May 1942 Final	Hearts	3–2	Hibernian	Tynecastle Park

=== Southern League Cup ===
28 February 1942 Southern League Cup Group	Motherwell	2–3	Hearts	Fir Park

14 March 1942 Southern League Cup Group	Third Lanark	3–5	Hearts	Cathkin Park

21 March 1942 Southern League Cup Group	Hearts	5–1	Motherwell	Tynecastle Park

28 March 1942 Southern League Cup Group	Rangers	2–1	Hearts	Ibrox Park

4 April 1942 Southern League Cup Group	Hearts	3–0	Third Lanark	Tynecastle Park

11 April 1942 Southern League Cup Group	Hearts	0–2	Rangers	Tynecastle Park

=== Summer Cup ===
30 May 1942 Summer Cup R1 1st Leg	St Mirren	3–3	Hearts	St Mirren Park, Love Street

6 June 1942 Summer Cup R1 2nd Leg	Hearts	4–1	St Mirren	Tynecastle Park

13 June 1942 Summer Cup R2 1st Leg	Albion Rovers	3–0	Hearts	Cliftohill

20 June 1942 Summer Cup R2 2nd Leg	Hearts	2–0	Albion Rovers	Tynecastle Park

=== Southern League ===
9 August 1941 Southern League	Hearts	3–0	Celtic	Tynecastle Park
				Attendance: 20,000

16 August 1941 Southern League	Airdrieonians	1–2	Hearts	Broomfield Park

23 August 1941 Southern League	Hearts	4–1	Partick Thistle	Tynecastle Park

30 August 1941 Southern League	Third Lanark	6–4	Hearts	Cathkin Park

6 September 1941 Southern League	Hearts	2–4	Hibernian	Tynecastle Park
				Attendance: 20,000

13 September 1941 Southern League	St Mirren	0–3	Hearts	St Mirren Park, Love Street

20 September 1941 Southern League	Hearts	2–1	Motherwell	Tynecastle Park

27 September 1941 Southern League	Falkirk	2–6	Hearts	Brockville Park

4 October 1941 Southern League	Hearts	4–1	Clyde	Tynecastle Park

11 October 1941 Southern League	Morton	4–0	Hearts	Cappielow Park

18 October 1941 Southern League	Hearts	6–2	Hamilton Academical	Tynecastle Park

25 October 1941 Southern League	Hearts	7–4	Dumbarton	Tynecastle Park

1 November 1941 Southern League	Albion Rovers	1–2	Hearts	Cliftonhill

8 November 1941 Southern League	Hearts	3–2	Queen's Park	Tynecastle Park

15 November 1941 Southern League	Rangers	5–2	Hearts	Ibrox Park

22 November 1941 Southern League	Celtic	4–4	Hearts	Celtic Park

29 November 1941 Southern League	Hearts	2–1	Airdireonians	Tynecastle Park

6 December 1941 Southern League	Partick Thistle	2–1	Hearts	Firhill Park

13 December 1941 Southern League	Hearts	1–5	Third Lanark	Tynecastle Park

20 December 1941 Southern League	Motherwell	6–2	Hearts	Fir Park

27 December 1941 Southern League	Hearts	7–0	Falkirk	Tynecastle Park

1 January 1942 Southern League	Hibernian	2–2	Hearts	Easter Road
				Attendance: 21,525

3 January 1942 Southern League	Hearts	8–2	St Mirren	Tynecastle Park
				Attendance: 5,355

17 January 1942 Southern League	Hearts	1–2	Morton	Tynecastle Park

31 January 1942 Southern League	Dumbarton	3–3	Hearts	Boghead Park

14 February 1942 Southern League	Queen's Park	4–1	Hearts	Hampden Park

21 February 1942 Southern League	Hearts	0–1	Rangers	Tynecastle Park

18 April 1942 Southern League	Hearts	2–2	Albion Rovers	Tynecastle Park

28 April 1942 Southern League	Clyde	2–0	Hearts	Shawfield Stadium

2 May 1942 Southern League	Hamilton Academical	2–1	Hearts	Douglas Park

== See also ==
- List of Heart of Midlothian F.C. seasons
