= 1941–42 Celtic F.C. season =

Celtic
1941–42 season
- Manager: Jimmy McStay
- Stadium: Celtic Park
- Southern League: 3rd
- Summer Cup: Second round
- Southern League Cup: Semi-finalists
Home colours

During the 1941–42 Scottish football season, Celtic competed in the Southern Football League.

== Competitions ==
=== Southern Football League ===
==== League table ====
Pos	Team	Pld	W	D	L	GF	GA	GD	Pts
1	Rangers (C)	30	22	4	4	97	35	+62	48
2	Hibernian	30	18	4	8	85	46	+39	40
3	Celtic	30	15	9	6	69	50	+19	39
4	Motherwell	30	16	3	11	76	62	+14	35
5	Clyde	30	13	6	11	79	75	+4	32

Source: Scottish Football History – Southern Football League
Rules for classification: 1) points; 2) goal difference; 3) number of goals scored.
(C) Champions

==== Matches ====
9 August 1941 Southern League	Hearts	3–0	Celtic	Edinburgh
				Stadium: Tynecastle Park

16 August 1941 Southern League	Celtic	4–2	Albion Rovers	Glasgow
				Stadium: Celtic Park

23 August 1941 Southern League	Dumbarton	2–5	Celtic	Dumbarton
				Stadium: Boghead Park

30 August 1941 Southern League	Celtic	2–0	Queen's Park	Glasgow
				Stadium: Celtic Park

6 September 1941 Southern League	Rangers	3–0	Celtic	Glasgow
				Stadium: Ibrox Park

13 September 1941 Southern League	Celtic	5–2	Clyde	Glasgow
				Stadium: Celtic Park

20 September 1941 Southern League	Hamilton Academical	3–3	Celtic	Hamilton
				Stadium: Douglas Park

27 September 1941 Southern League	Morton	2–3	Celtic	Greenock
				Stadium: Cappielow Park

4 October 1941 Southern League	Celtic	1–2	Motherwell	Glasgow
				Stadium: Celtic Park

11 October 1941 Southern League	Hibernian	1–3	Celtic	Edinburgh
				Stadium: Easter Road

18 October 1941 Southern League	St Mirren	2–2	Celtic	Paisley
				Stadium: St Mirren Park, Love Street

25 October 1941 Southern League	Celtic	1–1	Partick Thistle	Glasgow
				Stadium: Celtic Park

1 November 1941 Southern League	Celtic	3–1	Third Lanark	Glasgow
				Stadium: Celtic Park

8 November 1941 Southern League	Celtic	3–3	Airdrieonians	Glasgow
				Stadium: Celtic Park

15 November 1941 Southern League	Falkirk	0–1	Celtic	Falkirk
				Stadium: Brockville Park

22 November 1941 Southern League	Celtic	4–4	Hearts	Glasgow
				Stadium: Celtic Park

29 November 1941 Southern League	Albion Rovers	4–4	Celtic	Coatbridge
				Stadium: Cliftonhill

6 December 1941 Southern League	Celtic	4–2	Dumbarton	Glasgow
				Stadium: Celtic Park

13 December 1941 Southern League	Queen's Park	1–1	Celtic	Glasgow
				Stadium: Hampden Park

20 December 1941 Southern League	Celtic	2–1	Hamilton Academical	Glasgow
				Stadium: Celtic Park

27 December 1941 Southern League	Celtic	3–0	Morton	Glasgow
				Stadium: Celtic Park

1 January 1942 Southern League	Celtic	0–2	Rangers	Glasgow
				Stadium: Celtic Park

3 January 1942 Southern League	Clyde	2–1	Celtic	Glasgow
				Stadium: Shawfield Stadium

10 January 1942 Southern League	Motherwell	2–1	Celtic	Motherwell
				Stadium: Fir Park

17 January 1942 Southern League	Celtic	2–1	Hibernian	Glasgow
				Stadium: Celtic Park

31 January 1942 Southern League	Celtic	3–0	St Mirren	Glasgow
				Stadium: Celtic Park

7 February 1942 Southern League	Third Lanark	1–1	Celtic	Glasgow
				Stadium: Cathkin Park

14 February 1942 Southern League	Airdrieonians	2–2	Celtic	Airdrie
				Stadium: Broomfield Park

21 February 1942 Southern League	Celtic	2–0	Falkirk	Glasgow
				Stadium: Celtic Park

6 April 1942 Southern League	Partick Thistle	1–3	Celtic	Glasgow
				Stadium: Firhill Park

=== Summer Cup ===
30 May 1942 First round first leg	Celtic	2–1	Partick Thistle	Glasgow
				Stadium: Celtic Park

6 June 1942 First round second leg	Partick Thistle	0–2	Celtic	Glasgow
				Stadium: Firhill Park

13 June 1942 Second round first leg	Celtic	1–2	Motherwell	Glasgow
				Stadium: Celtic Park

20 June 1942 Second round second leg	Motherwell	2–1	Celtic	Motherwell
				Stadium: Fir Park

=== Southern League Cup ===
28 February 1942 Group	Queen's Park	1–2	Celtic	Glasgow
				Stadium: Hampden Park

7 March 1942 Group	Celtic	4–2	Hibernian	Glasgow
				Stadium: Celtic Park

14 March 1942 Group	Celtic	1–0	Hamilton Academical	Glasgow
				Stadium: Celtic Park

21 March 1942 Group	Celtic	6–2	Queen's Park	Glasgow
				Stadium: Celtic Park

28 March 1942 Group	Hibernian	1–0	Celtic	Edinburgh
				Stadium: Easter Road

4 April 1942 Group	Hamilton Academical	1–2	Celtic	Hamilton
				Stadium: Douglas Park

2 May 1942 Semi-final	Rangers	2–0	Celtic	Glasgow
				Stadium: Hampden Park
