= 1942–43 Heart of Midlothian F.C. season =

Heart of Midlothian
1942–43 season
- Manager: David McLean
- Stadium: Tynecastle Park
- Southern League: 7th
- Summer Cup: Round 1
- Southern League Cup: Group Stage

During the 1942–43 season Hearts competed in the Southern League, the Summer Cup, the Southern League Cup and the East of Scotland Shield.

== Fixtures ==
=== Friendlies ===
17 April 1943 Friendly	Dumbarton	3–1	Hearts	Boghead Park

=== Rosebery Charity Cup ===
22 May 1943 Final	Hearts	1–1 (Hearts win on coin toss)	Hibernian	Tynecastle Park
	Goal

=== East of Scotland Shield ===
15 May 1943 Semi-Final	Hearts	2–0	Edinburgh City	Tynecastle Park

15 May 1943 Final	Hearts	2–3 (aet)	Hibernian	Tynecastle Park

=== Southern League Cup ===
27 February 1943 Southern League Cup Group	Hearts	1–4	Hamilton Academical	Tynecastle Park

6 March 1943 Southern League Cup Group	Clyde	1–0	Hearts	Shawfield Stadium

13 March 1943 Southern League Cup Group	Queen's Park	0–0	Hearts	Hampden Park

20 March 1943 Southern League Cup Group	Hamilton Academical	5–0	Hearts	Douglas Park

27 March 1943 Southern League Cup Group	Hearts	1–1	Clyde	Tynecastle Park

3 April 1943 Southern League Cup Group	Hearts	4–2	Queen's Park	Tynecastle Park

=== Summer Cup ===
29 May 1943 Summer Cup R1 1st Leg	Rangers	2–0	Hearts	Ibrox Park

5 June 1943 Summer Cup R1 2nd Leg	Hearts	1–2	Rangers	Tynecastle Park

=== Southern League ===
8 August 1942 Southern League	Partick Thistle	2–3	Hearts	Firhill Park
				Attendance: 8,000

15 August 1942 Southern League	Hearts	3–1	Third Lanark	Tynecastle Park
				Attendance: 4,000

22 August 1942 Southern League	Motherwell	3–2	Hearts	Fir Park

29 August 1942 Southern League	Hearts	4–2	St Mirren	Tynecastle Park

5 September 1942 Southern League	Hibernian	2–2	Hearts	Easter Road
				Attendance: 25,000

12 September 1942 Southern League	Hearts	3–2	Falkirk	Tynecastle Park
				Attendance: 6,000

19 September 1942 Southern League	Clyde	2–2	Hearts	Shawfield Stadium
				Attendance: 8,000

26 September 1942 Southern League	Hearts	5–2	Morton	Tynecastle Park
				Attendance: 8,000

3 October 1942 Southern League	Hamilton Academical	3–2	Hearts	Douglas Park

10 October 1942 Southern League	Dumbarton	2–2	Hearts	Boghead Park

17 October 1942 Southern League	Hearts	5–1	Albion Rovers	Tynecastle Park

24 October 1942 Southern League	Queen's Park	3–2	Hearts	Hampden Park

31 October 1942 Southern League	Hearts	0–3	Rangers	Tynecastle Park
				Attendance: 21,537

7 November 1942 Southern League	Celtic	3–0	Hearts	Celtic Park

14 November 1942 Southern League	Hearts	5–2	Airdrieonians	Tynecastle Park

21 November 1942 Southern League	Hearts	3–3	Partick Thistle	Tynecastle Park

28 November 1942 Southern League	Third Lanark	1–2	Hearts	Cathkin Park

5 December 1942 Southern League	Hearts	1–6	Motherwell	Tynecastle Park
				Attendance: 5,218

12 December 1942 Southern League	St Mirren	2–1	Hearts	St Mirren Park, Love Street
				Attendance: 7,000

19 December 1942 Southern League	Hearts	1–3	Clyde	Tynecastle Park

26 December 1942 Southern League	Falkirk	2–2	Hearts	Brockville Park

1 January 1943 Southern League	Hearts	1–4	Hibernian	Tynecastle Park
				Attendance: 7,000

9 January 1943 Southern League	Morton	2–0	Hearts	Cappielow Park
				Attendance: 10,000

16 January 1943 Southern League	Hearts	0–1	Dumbarton	Tynecastle Park

23 January 1943 Southern League	Albion Rovers	1–3	Hearts	Cliftonhill

30 January 1943 Southern League	Hearts	1–0	Queen's Park	Tynecastle Park

6 February 1943 Southern League	Rangers	1–1	Hearts	Ibrox Park

13 February 1943 Southern League	Hearts	5–3	Celtic	Tynecastle Park
				Attendance: 8,487

20 February 1943 Southern League	Airdrieonians	2–4	Hearts	Broomfield Park

10 April 1943 Southern League	Hearts	4–0	Hamilton Academical	Tynecastle Park

== See also ==
- List of Heart of Midlothian F.C. seasons
