= 1942–43 Celtic F.C. season =

Celtic
1942–43 season
- Manager: Jimmy McStay
- Stadium: Celtic Park
- Southern League: 9th
- Summer Cup: Second round
- Southern League Cup: Group stage

During the 1942–43 Scottish football season, Celtic competed in the Southern Football League.

== Competitions ==
=== Southern Football League ===
==== League table ====
Pos	Team	Pld	W	D	L	GF	GA	GD	Pts
7	Heart of Midlothian	30	12	7	11	68	64	+4	31
8	Falkirk	30	12	6	12	68	58	+10	30
9	Celtic	30	10	8	12	61	76	−15	28
10	Dumbarton	30	11	6	13	76	76	0	28
11	Partick Thistle	30	9	8	13	63	67	−4	26

Source: Scottish Football History – Southern Football League
Rules for classification: 1) points; 2) goal difference; 3) number of goals scored.

==== Matches ====
8 August 1942 Southern League	Celtic	2–2	Dumbarton	Glasgow
				Stadium: Celtic Park

15 August 1942 Southern League	Queen's Park	2–2	Celtic	Glasgow
				Stadium: Hampden Park

22 August 1942 Southern League	Celtic	2–2	Hamilton Academical	Glasgow
				Stadium: Celtic Park

29 August 1942 Southern League	Clyde	1–3	Celtic	Glasgow
				Stadium: Shawfield Stadium

12 September 1942 Southern League	Morton	4–0	Celtic	Greenock
				Stadium: Cappielow Park

19 September 1942 Southern League	Motherwell	2–1	Celtic	Motherwell
				Stadium: Fir Park

26 September 1942 Southern League	Celtic	0–3	Hibernian	Glasgow
				Stadium: Celtic Park

3 October 1942 Southern League	Partick Thistle	2–3	Celtic	Glasgow
				Stadium: Fir Park

10 October 1942 Southern League	Celtic	3–2	St Mirren	Glasgow
				Stadium: Celtic Park

17 October 1942 Southern League	Third Lanark	4–2	Celtic	Glasgow
				Stadium: Cathkin Park

24 October 1942 Southern League	Airdrieonians	1–5	Celtic	Airdrie
				Stadium: Broomfield Park

31 October 1942 Southern League	Celtic	2–2	Falkirk	Glasgow
				Stadium: Celtic Park

7 November 1942 Southern League	Celtic	3–0	Heart of Midlothian	Glasgow
				Stadium: Celtic Park

14 November 1942 Southern League	Albion Rovers	4–4	Celtic	Coatbridge
				Stadium: Cliftonhill

21 November 1942 Southern League	Dumbarton	4–2	Celtic	Dumbarton
				Stadium: Boghead Park

28 November 1942 Southern League	Celtic	2–1	Queen's Park	Glasgow
				Stadium: Celtic Park

5 December 1942 Southern League	Hamilton Academical	2–1	Celtic	Hamilton
				Stadium: Douglas Park

12 December 1942 Southern League	Celtic	1–1	Clyde	Glasgow
				Stadium: Celtic Park

19 December 1942 Southern League	Celtic	3–2	Motherwell	Glasgow
				Stadium: Celtic Park

26 December 1942 Southern League	Celtic	0–2	Morton	Glasgow
				Stadium: Celtic Park

1 January 1943 Southern League	Rangers	8–1	Celtic	Glasgow
				Stadium: Ibrox Park

2 January 1943 Southern League	Celtic	3–3	Partick Thistle	Glasgow
				Stadium: Celtic Park

9 January 1943 Southern League	Hibernian	4–0	Celtic	Edinburgh
				Stadium: Easter Road

16 January 1943 Southern League	St Mirren	0–2	Celtic	Paisley
				Stadium: St Mirren Park, Love Street

23 January 1943 Southern League	Celtic	3–2	Third Lanark	Glasgow
				Stadium: Celtic Park

30 January 1943 Southern League	Celtic	2–3	Airdrieonians	Glasgow
				Stadium: Celtic Park

6 February 1943 Southern League	Falkirk	6–0	Celtic	Falkirk
				Stadium: Brockville Park

13 February 1943 Southern League	Hearts	5–3	Celtic	Edinburgh
				Stadium: Tynecastle Park

20 February 1943 Southern League	Celtic	4–0	Albion Rovers	Glasgow
				Stadium: Celtic Park

10 April 1943 Southern League	Celtic	2–2	Rangers	Glasgow
				Stadium: Celtic Park

=== Summer Cup ===
29 May 1943 First round first leg	Motherwell	2–2	Celtic	Motherwell
				Stadium: Fir Park

5 June 1943 First round second leg	Celtic	3–2	Motherwell	Glasgow
				Stadium: Celtic Park

12 June 1943 Second round first leg	Celtic	0–4	Rangers	Glasgow
				Stadium: Celtic Park

19 June 1943 Second round second leg	Rangers	4–1	Celtic	Glasgow
				Stadium: Ibrox Park

=== Southern League Cup ===
27 February 1943 Group	Celtic	2–1	Hibernian	Glasgow
				Stadium: Celtic Park

6 March 1943 Group	Rangers	3–0	Celtic	Glasgow
				Stadium: Ibrox Park

13 March 1943 Group	Celtic	2–0	St Mirren	Glasgow
				Stadium: Celtic Park

20 March 1943 Group	Hibernian	2–1	Celtic	Edinburgh
				Stadium: Easter Road

27 March 1943 Group	Celtic	0–2	Rangers	Glasgow
				Stadium: Celtic Park

3 April 1943 Group	St Mirren	5–1	Celtic	Paisley
				Stadium: St Mirren Park, Love Street
