= 1937–38 Scottish Cup =

1937–1938 Scottish Cup
Tournament details
- Country: Scotland

Final positions
- Champions: East Fife
- Runners-up: Kilmarnock

The 1937–38 Scottish Cup was the 60th staging of Scotland's most prestigious football knockout competition. The Cup was won by East Fife who defeated Kilmarnock in the replayed final.

== Fourth round ==
Team One	Team Two	Score
Falkirk	Rangers	1-2
Kilmarnock	Ayr United	1-1 5-0
St Bernards	Motherwell	3-1
East Fife	Raith Rovers	2-2 3-2

== Semi-finals ==
2 April 1938

East Fife	1 – 1	St Bernard's

Attendance: 34,000

2 April 1938

Rangers	3 – 4	Kilmarnock
Alex Venters; Willie Thornton		Allan Collins; Benny Thomson

Hampden Park, Glasgow
Attendance: 70,833

=== Replay ===
6 April 1938

East Fife	1 – 1 (a.e.t.)	St Bernard's

Attendance: 30,185

==== Second replay ====
13 April 1938

East Fife	2 – 1	St Bernard's

Attendance: 32,564

== Final ==
23 April 1938

East Fife	1 – 1	Kilmarnock
McLeod		McAvoy

Hampden Park, Glasgow
Attendance: 80,091

=== Replay ===
27 April 1938

East Fife	4 – 2 (a.e.t.)	Kilmarnock
McKerrell; McLeod; Miller		Thomson (pen.); McGrogan

Hampden Park, Glasgow
Attendance: 92,716

== See also ==
- 1937–38 in Scottish football
