= Ben Thomson =

Ben Thomson may refer to:

- Ben Thomson (ice hockey, born 1982), Canadian ice hockey player
- Ben Thomson (ice hockey, born 1993), Canadian ice hockey player
- Ben Thomson (physician), Canadian nephrologist
- Ben Thomson, also known as Ben UFO, British disc jockey

== See also ==
- Ben Thompson (disambiguation)
- Benny Thomson, Scottish footballer
