= John Fitzsimons =

John Fitzsimons may refer to:

- John Fitzsimons (footballer) (1915–1995), Scottish footballer
- John FitzSimons (born 1943), British former track and field athlete

== See also ==
- John Fitzsimmons (1939–2008), Scottish Roman Catholic priest and radio presenter
