= Tom McKillop (footballer) =

Scottish footballer

Personal information
- Full name: Thomas Boyd McKillop
- Date of birth: 27 October 1917
- Place of birth: Dreghorn, Scotland
- Date of death: February 1984 (aged 66)
- Place of death: Bromley, England
- Position: Right half

Senior career*
Years	Team	Apps	(Gls)
–	Dreghorn		
1935–1946	Rangers	73	(1)
1946–1947	Asturias		
1947–1954	Rhyl		

International career
1938	Scotland	1	(0)
- * Club domestic league appearances and goals

Thomas Boyd McKillop (27 October 1917 – February 1984) was a Scottish footballer who played for Rangers, winning the Scottish Football League title on two occasions with the Govan club (1936–37 and 1938–39). His football career was then interrupted by the Second World War, during which he served in the British Army. At the end of the war, he accepted an invitation from William Reaside to play in Mexico, alongside Jackie Milne and Jimmy Hickie. He then moved to Wales to play for Rhyl, and later managed the club. His daughters Sarah and Liz were raised in Wales, Liz was later a prominent civil servant in Scotland during the 1990s.

McKillop represented Scotland once, in a 3–1 victory against Netherlands in May 1938.
