= Jimmy Hickie =

Scottish footballer (1915–1973)

Personal information
- Full name: James Hickie
- Date of birth: 1915
- Place of birth: Larkhall, Scotland
- Date of death: 1973 (aged 57)
- Place of death: Larkhall, Scotland
- Height: 5 ft 9 1/2 in (1.77 m)
- Position: Left back

Senior career*
Years	Team	Apps	(Gls)
–	Larkhall Thistle		
–	Burnbank Athletic		
–	Preston North End		
1937–1946	Clyde	63	(0)
1946–1947	Asturias		
1947	Dunfermline Athletic	5	(0)

International career
1938	Scottish League XI	1	(0)
- * Club domestic league appearances and goals

James Hickie (1915–1973) was a Scottish footballer who played as a left back. In a professional career badly affected by World War II, prior to the conflict he won the Scottish Cup with Clyde in 1939 and was selected for the Scottish Football League XI. During wartime he turned out for Clyde, St Mirren and Dumbarton in unofficial competitions, and at its end he accepted an invitation from William Reaside to play in Mexico for a year, alongside Jackie Milne and Tom McKillop, before returning to Scotland where he played briefly for Dunfermline Athletic.

His Scottish Cup medal was stolen from his son's home in a 1992 housebreaking but later appeared for sale at auction, and was subsequently returned to the family.
