= Allan Collins (Scottish footballer) =

Scottish footballer

Personal information
- Date of birth: 24 January 1918
- Place of birth: Kilmarnock, Scotland
- Date of death: 10 April 2002 (aged 84)
- Place of death: Kilmarnock, Scotland
- Position: Centre-forward

Youth career
- Cumnock

Senior career*
Years	Team	Apps	(Gls)
1936–1948	Kilmarnock	110	(56)
1948–1951	Raith Rovers		
1951–1953	Stenhousemuir		
- * Club domestic league appearances and goals

Allan Collins (24 January 1918 – 10 April 2002) was a Scottish footballer who played for Kilmarnock, Raith Rovers and Stenhousemuir in the Scottish Football League either side of the Second World War. Collins was part of the Kilmarnock side in the 1938 Scottish Cup Final, which they lost to East Fife after a replay.
