= George Robertson (footballer, born 1915) =

Scottish footballer

Personal information
- Date of birth: 8 September 1915
- Place of birth: Kilmarnock, Scotland
- Date of death: 24 January 2006 (aged 90)
- Place of death: Irvine, Scotland
- Position: Right half

Senior career*
Years	Team	Apps	(Gls)
–	Dalry Thistle		
1934–1936	Irvine Meadow		
1936–1939	Kilmarnock	72	(1)
Total		72	(1)

International career
1937	Scottish League XI	1	(0)
1937	Scotland	1	(0)
- * Club domestic league appearances and goals

George Robertson (8 September 1915 – 24 January 2006) was a Scottish footballer, who played as a right half for Irvine Meadow, Kilmarnock and Scotland. He played in the 1938 Scottish Cup Final which Kilmarnock lost to East Fife after a replay.
