= Andrew Fyfe (anatomist) =

Scottish anatomist

- Born: 30 August 1752; Edinburgh, Scotland
- Died: 31 March 1824 (aged 71); Edinburgh, Scotland
- Education: University of Edinburgh
- Spouse: Agnes Ord Williamson
- Children: 9, including Andrew

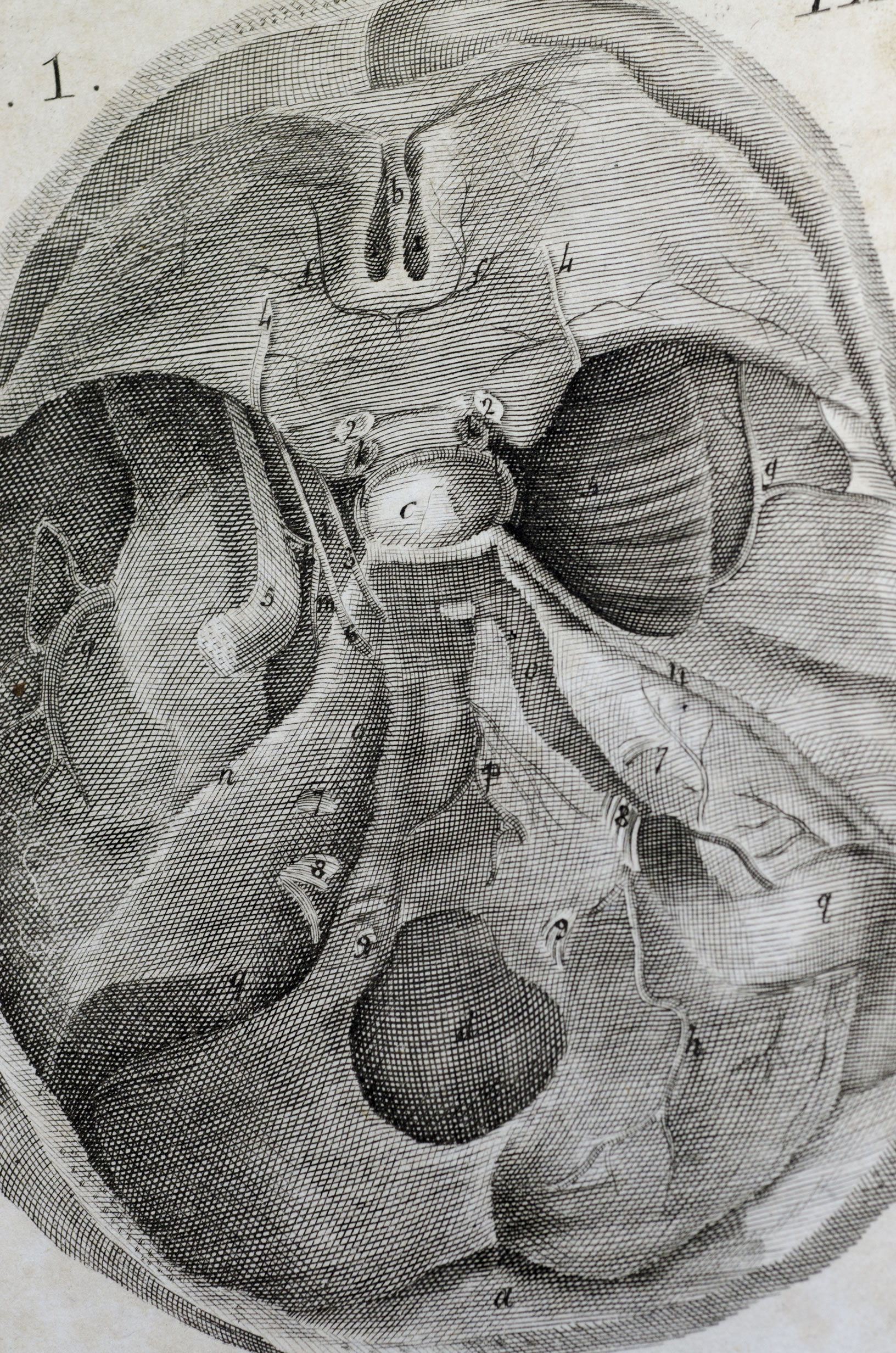
Base of cranium: a plate from one of Fyfe's anatomy books

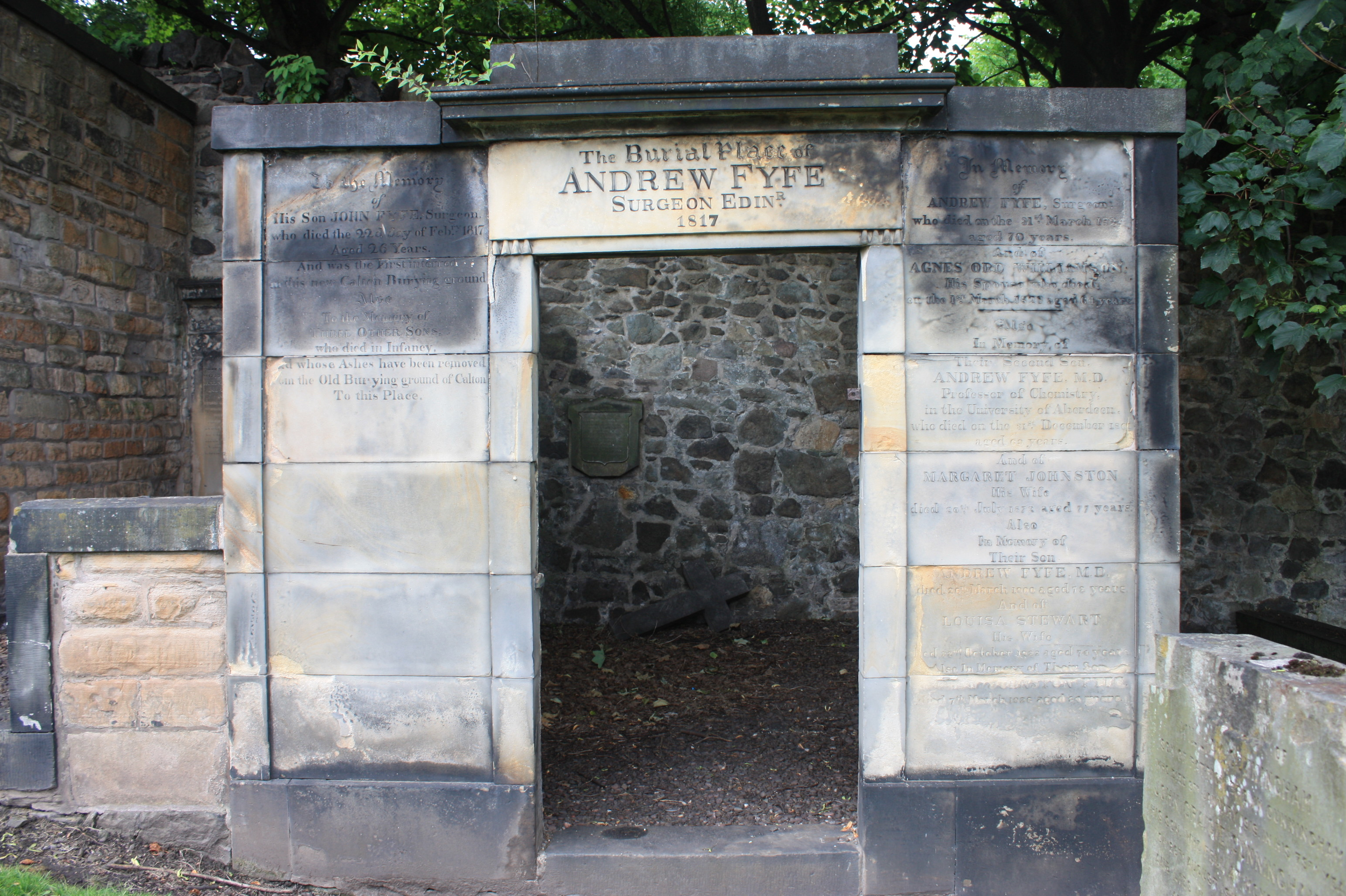
The burial vault of Andrew Fyfe, New Calton Cemetery, Edinburgh

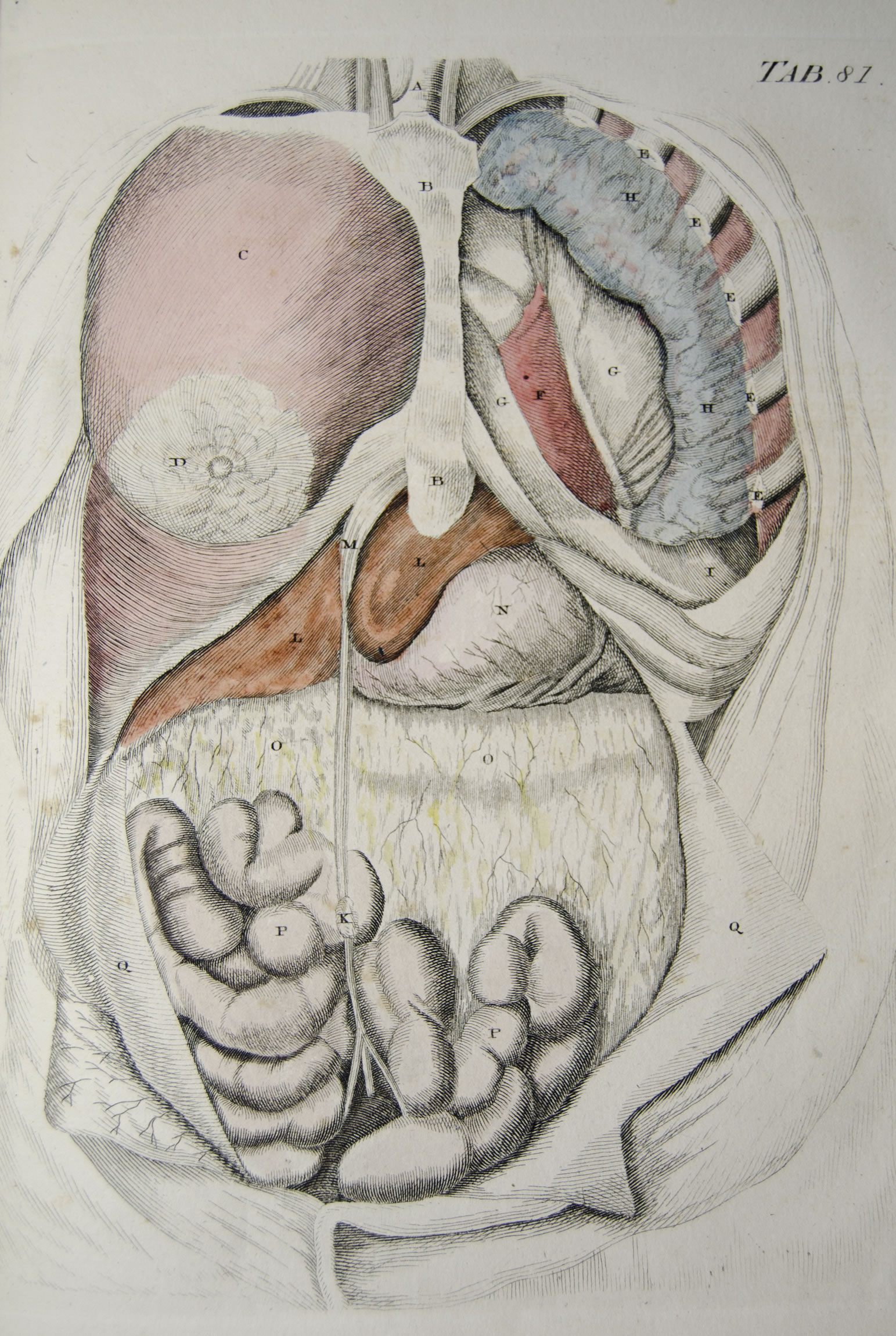
Internal organs - thorax and abdomen: a plate from one of Fyfe's anatomy books

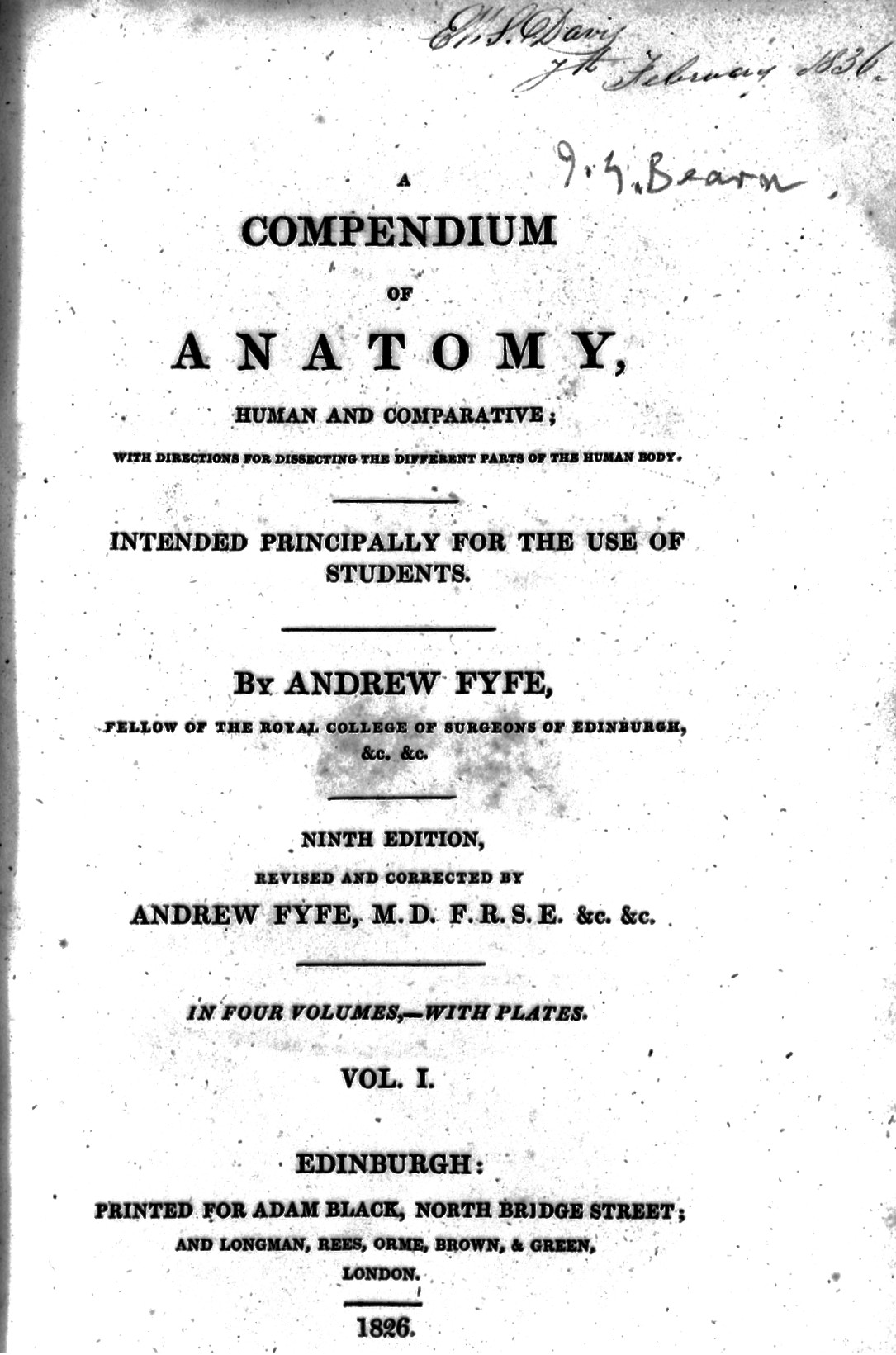
A compendium of anatomy, by Andrew Fyfe, 1826.

Andrew Fyfe (30 August 1752 – 31 March 1824) was a Scottish anatomist.

== Life ==
Fyfe was born in 1752, probably at Corstorphine, near Edinburgh, where he was baptized and where his father John Fyfe lived.

He was apprenticed toi become surgeon with Mr. Anderson. He took classes in medical subjects during several years at the University of Edinburgh, but did not take a degree. He also showed his talent as an artist in drawing and received a medal in 1775. In 1777 he was appointed 'dissector' to Monro secundus, professor of anatomy in Edinburgh University, in 1777: the post was joint with John Innes, but he died that year. For about forty years Fyfe superintended the dissections and gave demonstrations in the anatomical school under Alexander Monro secundus and later his son Alexander Monro tertius. Sir Astley Cooper, who attended his demonstrations in 1787-8, wrote:

'I learned much from him. He was a horrid lecturer, but an industrious, worthy man, and good practical anatomist. His lecture was, "I say—eh, eh, eh, gentlemen; eh, eh, eh, gentlemen—I say, etc.;" whilst the tallow from a naked candle he held in his hand ran over the back of it and over his clothes: but his drawings and depictions were well made and very useful.'

Bransby Cooper, who attended Fyfe in 1815-16, says: "Mr. Fyfe was a tall thin man, and one of the most ungainly lecturers I ever knew."

It is not clear when his assistancy ceased, but it is pretty certain that he lectured and taught anatomy somewhere in the Horse Wynd. He was entered as fellow of the Edinburgh College of Surgeons, 23 October 1818, a few weeks before the entry of his son Andrew. It appears that his lectures at last failed to be remunerative, and that in his latter years he devoted himself to his anatomical text-books and engravings.

He died on 31 March 1824. He is buried in New Calton Cemetery in a distinctive vault lying against the north wall.

He had at least five sons and one daughter, and another three died in infancy. Four sons also later took up the medical profession.

== Works ==
Fyfe was a writer of text-books, which were as dry as his lectures, but, being associated with and adapted to the university plan of teaching, they had a large sale. To the last his books were dated from the "college", that is the university. The seventh edition of his Compendium, 1819, bears on the title-page after his name "teacher of anatomy, and many years assistant in the anatomical theatre, university of Edinburgh"; while the fourth edition of his System, 1820, states that he was "still conservator to the museum of the university".

Fyfe's works are:

- A System of Anatomy and Physiology from Monro, Winslow, Innes, 2 vols. 1784, 2nd edit. 1787 (edited by A.F.), with the addition of Physiology based on Haller and others, and the Comparative Anatomy of Alexander Monro primus.
- A Compendium of the Anatomy of the Human Body, 2 vols. 1800; 8th edit. 4 vols. 1823, entitled A Compendium of Anatomy, Human and Comparative, the fourth volume dealing with comparative anatomy, based chiefly on Cuvier and Blumenbach; 9th edit. 1826; a 3rd American edit, in 2 vols. was published at Philadelphia in 1810.
- A System of Anatomy (first edition also called 'Compendium'), chiefly consisting of plates and explanatory references, Edinburgh, 1800, 3 vols. quarto, containing 160 plates and 700 figures; 4th edit. 1820.
- Views of the Bones, Muscles, Viscera, and Organs of the Senses, copied from the most celebrated authors, together with several additions from nature, 23 plates, folio, Edinburgh and London, 1800.
- Outlines of Comparative Anatomy, 1813; later edit. 1823, entitled 'A Compendium of Comparative Anatomy.'
- On Crural Hernia, 1818. In 1830 the plates to illustrate the Anatomy of the Human Body (158 plates), and an octavo volume of Descriptions of the Plates, were posthumously issued.

== Family ==
He was married to Agnes Ord Williamson (1764-1828). They had nine children, of whom three died in infancy. Four sons entered the medical profession. The chemist Andrew Fyfe (1792–1861) was his eldest son.
