= Andy Fyfe (footballer, born 1898) =

Scottish footballer

Personal information
- Full name: Andrew Fyfe
- Date of birth: 27 July 1898
- Place of birth: Dennistoun, Scotland
- Position: Centre forward

Senior career*
Years	Team	Apps	(Gls)
1920–1924	Queen's Park	85	(40)
- * Club domestic league appearances and goals

Andrew Fyfe was a Scottish amateur footballer who played as a centre forward in the Scottish League for Queen's Park.

== Personal life ==
Fyfe served as a bombardier in the Royal Garrison Artillery during the First World War. He was mentioned in dispatches.
