= Benjamin Thompson (dramatist) =

English dramatist

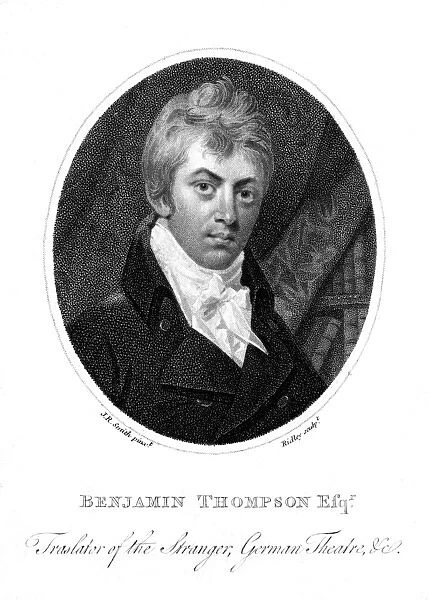
- Born: 1776?
- Died: 26 May 1816; London
- Occupation: Dramatist

Benjamin Thompson (1776? – 26 May 1816) was an English dramatist.

== Biography ==
Thompson was born about 1776, was the son of Benjamin Blaydes Thompson, a merchant of Kingston-upon-Hull. He was educated for the law, but, disliking the profession, he was sent to Hamburg as his father's agent. He occupied his leisure by translating several of August von Kotzebue's dramas. On 24 March 1798 one of these, ‘The Stranger,’ was brought out at Drury Lane, John Philip Kemble taking the title rôle. It met with much success both there and in 1801 at Covent Garden (Genest, Hist. of the Stage, vii. 336, 513, 591, viii. 478, ix. 457). It was published in 1801 (London, 8vo), and has since been frequently reprinted. On 12 October 1812 an original operatic drama by Thompson, entitled ‘Godolphin,’ was unsuccessfully produced at Drury Lane. A second piece, called ‘Oberon's Oath,’ at the same theatre on 21 May 1816, was not well received at first. The disappointment is said to have killed him. He died in Blackfriars Road, London, on 26 May 1816. In 1799 he married Jane, youngest daughter of John Bourne, rector of Sutton-cum-Duckmanton and of South Wingfield in Derbyshire. By her he had six children.

Besides the works mentioned, Thompson was the author of:

- ‘The Florentines: a Tale,’ London, 1808, 8vo.
- ‘An Account of the Introduction of Merino Sheep into the different States of Europe and at the Cape of Good Hope,’ London, 1810, 8vo. He also translated numerous German plays, which were published in a collective form under the title ‘The German Theatre’ in 1801, London, 8vo.
