= Doug McAvoy (footballer) =

Scottish footballer

Personal information
- Full name: Douglas Haig McAvoy
- Date of birth: 29 November 1918
- Place of birth: Kilmarnock, Scotland
- Date of death: 15 April 1988 (aged 69)
- Place of death: Kilmarnock, Scotland
- Position: Inside forward

Senior career*
Years	Team	Apps	(Gls)
–	Cumnock Juniors		
1935–1947	Kilmarnock	86	(20)
1947–1949	Liverpool	2	(0)
1949–1951	Queen of the South	26	(3)
Total		114	(23)
- * Club domestic league appearances and goals

Douglas Haig McAvoy (29 November 1918 – 15 April 1988) was a Scottish footballer who played as an inside forward for Kilmarnock, Liverpool and Queen of the South. His career was interrupted by World War II; prior to its outbreak he finished on the losing side (after a replay) in the 1938 Scottish Cup Final, and was selected for a Scottish Football Association tour of North America in the summer of 1939 (the fixtures of which did not include any official internationals).
