= Ben Thompson (footballer, born 2002) =

British footballer

Personal information
- Full name: Ben Owen Thompson
- Date of birth: 26 November 2002 (age 23)
- Place of birth: Wrexham, Wales
- Position: Midfielder

Team information
- Current team: Fleetwood Town
- Number: 44

Youth career
- –2017: Connah's Quay Nomads
- 2017–2019: Bury
- 2019–2021: Fleetwood Town

Senior career*
Years	Team	Apps	(Gls)
2021–	Fleetwood Town	0	(0)
2022	→ Ashton United (loan)	1	(0)
- * Club domestic league appearances and goals as of 22:42, 22 June 2022 (UTC)

Ben Owen Thomoson (born 26 November 2002 in Wrexham, is a Welsh professional footballer who plays for EFL League Two club Fleetwood Town, as a midfielder.

== Career ==
Thompson started his career in the Academy at Connah's Quay Nomads at the age of ten and progressed through age groups up to under-14 level, where he was an ever-present in the side. In February 2017, he was invited for a six-week trial at EFL League One club Bury. Just two weeks into the trial he was offered a two-year contract with their Academy. He spent two years in the Academy at Bury, but was forced to leave the club in August 2019 when the first team were expelled from the English Football League and the Academy was disbanded.

He subsequently moved to EFL League One side Fleetwood Town on a two-year youth scholarship. On 27 April 2021, he earned his first professional contract with the club, signing a two-year deal with the option of a further year. This was after he had been an ever-present for the under-18 side that won the Youth Alliance North West League. He made the step-up to first team football in October 2021, when he made his first start for the club in the EFL Trophy victory over Barrow.

On 2 January 2022, he was sent out on loan to Northern Premier League Premier Division side Ashton United on an initial one-month loan deal.

== Career statistics ==
As of match played 30 August 2022

Appearances and goals by club, season and competition
Club	Season	League			FA Cup		League Cup		Other		Total	
Club	Season	Division	Apps	Goals	Apps	Goals	Apps	Goals	Apps	Goals	Apps	Goals
Fleetwood Town	2021–22	League One	0	0	0	0	0	0	1 (Note: Appearance in EFL Trophy)	0	1	0
Fleetwood Town	2022–23	League One	0	0	0	0	0	0	1	0	1	0
Fleetwood Town	Total		0	0	0	0	0	0	2	0	2	0
Ashton United (loan)	2021–22	NPL Premier Division	1	0	—		—		—		1	0
Career total			1	0	0	0	0	0	2	0	3	0
