= Ben Thomson (physician) =

Canadian nephrologist and educator

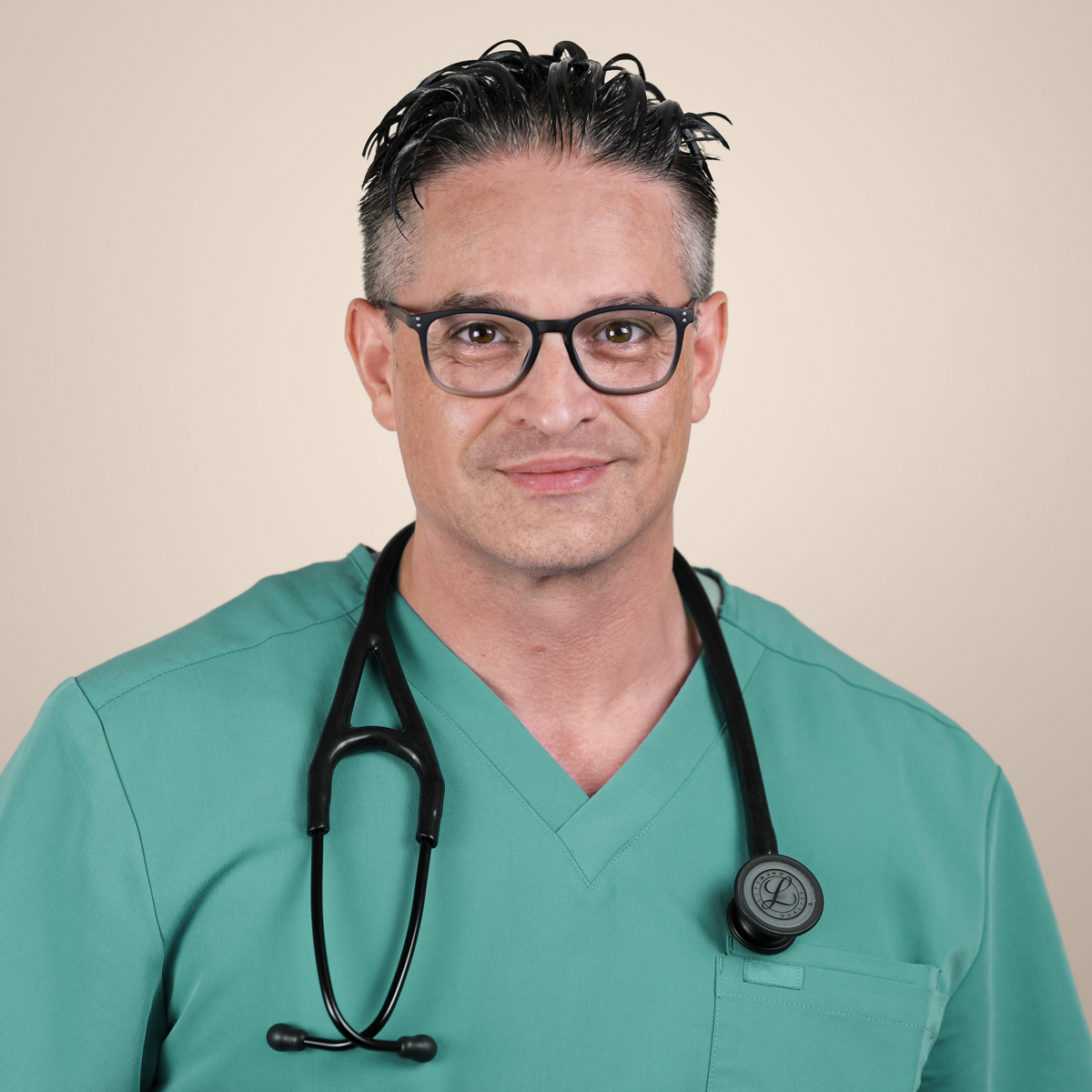
- Education: National University of Ireland, Cork, Western University
- Occupations: Nephrologist, public health expert, educator, humanitarian physician
- Known for: Keys of Health Fellowship, EmpowerGaza
- Website: https://benthomson.org/

Benjamin Kervin Alan Thomson is a Canadian nephrologist and educator known for his work in improving healthcare delivery. He has contributed to developing educational programs for Indigenous communities in Ontario, establishing healthcare facilities in Uganda, and enhancing medical infrastructure in Gaza. Thomson is the founder of the Keys of Health Fellowship and co-founder of EmpowerGaza, initiatives aimed at supporting local healthcare systems in marginalized regions. In 2023, after he made social media posts relating to the Gaza war, both Thomson and the hospital he worked at received anonymous threats of violence. As a result, Thomson was forced to flee his home, and his hospital temporarily suspended him due to safety concerns. Thomson has since sued the hospital.

== Early life and education ==
Thomson completed his medical education at the National University of Ireland, Cork, followed by an Internal Medicine Clinical Fellowship at the University of Calgary. He then specialized in nephrology and completed an M.Sc. in Medical Biophysics at Western University.

== Career ==
Thomson began his academic career as an adjunct professor in the Division of Nephrology at Western University. He later joined Queen's University's Department of Medicine, where he became an associate professor in medicine and served as the medical director for home dialysis, where he led a 289% growth in the program over three years.

Since 2019, Thomson has been an attending physician at Mackenzie Health in the Division of Nephrology, providing care to both outpatient and inpatient nephrology patients.

Since 2013, Thomson has lectured at the Islamic University of Gaza (IUG) Medical School on nephrology and internal medicine, adapting the curriculum to address the challenges of resource-limited, conflict-affected settings.

== Research and publications ==
Thomson's research focuses on healthcare delivery in underserved populations, including Indigenous communities and humanitarian settings, as well as on social determinants of health.

One area of Thomson's work addresses chronic kidney disease (CKD) in Indigenous populations. CKD poses a significant healthcare burden on Indigenous communities and individuals in remote areas, where evidence-based interventions are limited. Thomson's study, published in the Canadian Journal of Kidney Health and Disease, examines potential strategies to improve renal health outcomes for these populations.

Another focus of his research examines the role of social determinants in health outcomes, which account for about 50% of ill health. Thomson has explored how incorporating social determinants into medical education could enhance healthcare delivery, with findings published in the Canadian Medical Education Journal.

Thomson has also conducted research on tuberculosis, focusing on its impact and management in marginalized and remote communities. His work emphasizes the need for context-specific approaches to managing infectious diseases in underserved regions.

In humanitarian contexts, Thomson has written on healthcare challenges, particularly in crisis areas like Gaza. In a recent article for The Conversation in partnership with McMaster University, he examined the complexities surrounding access to life-saving dialysis treatments in conflict zones.

Thomson's Kidney-CAP device, developed with the Glia team to reduce bleeding risks from dialysis access points for patients in remote settings, was based on research he co-authored studying these heightened risks.

== Medical devices ==
In response to the need for protective equipment in healthcare settings, Thomson and the Glia team developed a 3D-printable aerosol-reducing face shield to help limit airborne disease transmission in healthcare settings.

Thomson was part of a team that developed a ventilation mask designed to minimize aerosolization, reducing the risk of virus transmission in COVID-19 patients. Created from a modified firefighter's mask, this device can be used with CPAP or BiPAP machines and features a dual seal to prevent air leaks. The mask uses a filter to capture viral particles.

Thomson developed the Kidney-CAP (Catheter Access Protection), a device designed to enhance the safety of dialysis treatment by preventing bleeding from the access points used by patients during dialysis. Developed in collaboration with the Glia team, the Kidney-CAP aims to be affordable and practical for use in low- and middle-income countries.

== Humanitarian work ==
Thomson has played a leadership role in the development and implementation of the Multi-Subspecialty Education for Low-Resource Settings (MSERS) program, an educational initiative addressing specific health challenges faced by Indigenous communities across Ontario. The program offers medical subspecialties through educational sessions led by experts. Topics include COVID-19 management, women's health, internal medicine, emergency medicine, and mental health—covering conditions that are prevalent or particularly challenging to manage in remote settings. Thomson has led multiple sessions, including those on hypertension management, peritoneal dialysis, and anemia in remote and Indigenous populations.

In Uganda, Thomson participated in medical missions in Kamengo, supporting the establishment of a Women's Health Centre in collaboration with the Agnes Zabali Boys and Girls Club and the Canada Africa Community Health Alliance (CACHA).

Thomson has been involved in humanitarian efforts in the Gaza Strip, focusing on developing healthcare infrastructure and medical education in the region. His initial visit in 2013 was as part of a public health needs assessment team invited by the Gaza Ministry of Health and funded by the World Health Organization (WHO). During this assessment, Thomson evaluated nephrology services across various hospitals and clinics, identifying critical gaps and areas for improvement. Thomson co-founded EmpowerGaza alongside Tarek Loubani that aimed to install solar panels on four major hospitals to provide a reliable and sustainable energy source for critical care units, including emergency rooms, intensive care units, and operating theaters. This initiative addressed frequent power outages that hindered medical services, especially during times of conflict.

Thomson founded the Keys of Health Fellowship, a program designed to train and empower local healthcare professionals in Gaza and other marginalized regions. The fellowship seeks to reduce reliance on foreign medical missions by equipping local physicians with medical training to strengthen the local healthcare system's capacity. The name "Keys of Health" is inspired by the symbolic keys held by Palestinian families displaced during the 1948 Nakba, representing hope and the aspiration to return. Islamic Relief Canada is a partner of the Keys of Health Fellowship. The Keys of Health Fellowship is an associate member of the Ontario Council for International Cooperation.

== Public speaking and advocacy ==
Thomson has spoken on public healthcare and humanitarian issues, especially the healthcare challenges in Gaza since 2013. He advocates for a ceasefire and raises awareness about the human rights violations, severe shortages of medical supplies, damaged infrastructure, and the need for international intervention to prevent further collapse. He also speaks on the Humanitarian-Development-Peace Nexus to integrate aid with long-term development.

In October 2024, Thomson spoke on the Triple Nexus approach to humanitarian, development, and peace efforts at Cooperation Canada's International Cooperation Futures conference, discussing the challenges of rebuilding Gaza's healthcare amidst conflict and blockades. He emphasized the importance of a coordinated approach and adherence to international humanitarian law for sustainable recovery. Thomson also addressed the Palliative Care in Humanitarian Aid Situations and Emergencies on the dialysis crisis facing Gaza's kidney patients. Additionally, he delivered a lecture for Human Concern International titled "Humanitarian Healthcare in Gaza: Insights from the Ground," where he shared first-hand accounts of Gaza's critical healthcare shortages and advocated for global support and community empowerment to rebuild essential services. Thomson participated in Islamic Relief Canada's national tour, Imagining Liberation: The Struggle for Peace in Gaza Continues, traveling across Canada to share his experiences in Gaza and raise awareness.

Following his medical missions to Gaza after October 7, Thomson joined the #EyeWitnessGaza Campaign to provide witness statements detailing the healthcare crisis in the region. His accounts, along with those of other physicians who traveled to Gaza, have been submitted to the International Criminal Court (ICC), the International Court of Justice (ICJ), and Scotland Yard as evidence in ongoing investigations into alleged human rights violations.

== Suspension and lawsuit ==
In October 2023, Thomson was temporarily suspended by Mackenzie Health following a social media post advocating for Palestinians in Gaza. Initially, Mackenzie Health issued a statement asserting that certain social media posts did not align with the organization's values and reiterated its commitment against hate, violence, human rights violations, and terrorism. After ten days, the suspension was lifted, with Mackenzie Health attributing the decision to security concerns unrelated to Thomson's views. The hospital later stated, "it is false to suggest Dr. Thomson was suspended for his views." Thomson has since filed a $1.5 million lawsuit, alleging defamation and procedural flaws. A media investigation reported that screenshots from a Facebook group called "Canadian Jewish Physicians" allegedly show doctors discussing filing safety complaints against Thomson, irrespective of their validity. Media reports have documented other instances where individuals faced professional consequences related to publicly expressed views on this topic in Canada. The Canadians for Justice and Peace in the Middle East (CJPME) suggested that Thomson's suspension, following his social media post, reflects what they describe as anti-Palestinian racism (APR). According to CJPME, Thomson's post aimed to correct misinformation and oppose language that justified violence against Palestinians. The Arab Canadian Lawyers Association defines APR as instances where criticisms of Israeli actions by Palestinians and their allies are characterized as antisemitic.
