= John Fitzsimons (footballer) =

Scottish footballer

Personal information
- Full name: John Thomas Fitzsimons
- Date of birth: 3 March 1915
- Place of birth: Glasgow, Scotland
- Date of death: 3 September 1995 (aged 80)
- Place of death: Glasgow, Scotland
- Position: Outside left

Youth career
- St Joseph's College

Senior career*
Years	Team	Apps	(Gls)
- St Roch's
1934–1938	Celtic	5	(0)
1938–1941	Alloa Athletic	28	(22)
1941–1942	Clyde	0	(0)
1942–1946	Falkirk	15	(6)
1946–1947	Hamilton Academical	11	(3)
1947–1948	Clyde	21	(7)
Total		80	(38)
- * Club domestic league appearances and goals

John Thomas Fitzsimons (3 March 1915 – 3 September 1995) was a Scottish footballer who played as an outside left, and a medical doctor who acted as Celtic F.C.'s club physician for 34 years, also working for the Scotland national football team in the role.

He began his senior football career at Celtic in 1934, also training for his medical qualifications at the Anderson College of Medicine (then associated with the University of Glasgow but today an integral part of the University of Strathclyde). Due in part to his educational commitments he was only a fringe player at the Hoops (five Scottish Division One appearances in four seasons), and transferred to lower division Alloa Athletic in 1938. During World War II when the usual competitions were suspended for seven years, he switched to Clyde then Falkirk, where he made over 150 appearances in total, played on the losing side in the 1943 Southern League Cup final and was still with the Bairns when official competitions resumed in 1946, though by the end of that year he had signed for Hamilton Academical, soon making a return to Clyde before retiring from playing in 1948.

In his medical career, Fitzsimons worked at Belvidere Hospital (Parkhead) then as a GP in his native Glasgow. In 1953 he was appointed as Celtic's club doctor, a position he held until 1987 spanning the highly successful period under manager Jock Stein. He had a similar occasional role with the Scottish international squad from 1970 to 1982, accompanying them to three FIFA World Cup finals tournaments. He was made a Knight of the Order of St. Sylvester by Pope Paul VI in 1976 for his commitment to the local Lourdes Hospitalité pilgrimage foundation.
