= John Stewart (footballer, born 1914) =

Scottish footballer

Personal information
- Full name: John George Stewart
- Date of birth: 14 November 1914
- Place of birth: Maryhill, Scotland
- Position: Wing half

Senior career*
Years	Team	Apps	(Gls)
1933–1936	Queen's Park	30	(0)
1936–1937	Rangers	0	(0)
1937–1940	Kilmarnock	39	(0)

International career
1934–1935	Scotland Amateurs	4	(0)
- * Club domestic league appearances and goals

John George Stewart (born 14 November 1914; date of death unknown) was a Scottish amateur footballer who played in the Scottish League for Kilmarnock and Queen's Park as a wing half. He was capped by Scotland at amateur level.
