= Andrew Fyfe (chemist) =

Scottish surgeon and chemist

Andrew Fyfe FRSE
- Born: 18 January 1792; Edinburgh, Scotland
- Died: 31 December 1861 (aged 69); Edinburgh, Scotland
- Education: University of Edinburgh (MD)
- Occupations: Surgeon, chemist
- Spouse(s): Eliza Charles; Margaret Johnstone
- Children: 3
- Father: Andrew Fyfe

Andrew Fyfe FRSE FRCSE PRSSA PRMS (18 January 1792 – 31 December 1861) was a Scottish surgeon and chemist. Following early studies on Fox Talbot's newly created photographic techniques he was one of the first (1839) to work out the theory behind positive rather than negative prints. He had an amateur interest in photography but appears not to have pursued his own theories (later very important in the creation of moving images) and limited his experiments to ferns lying on chemical papers.

== Life ==
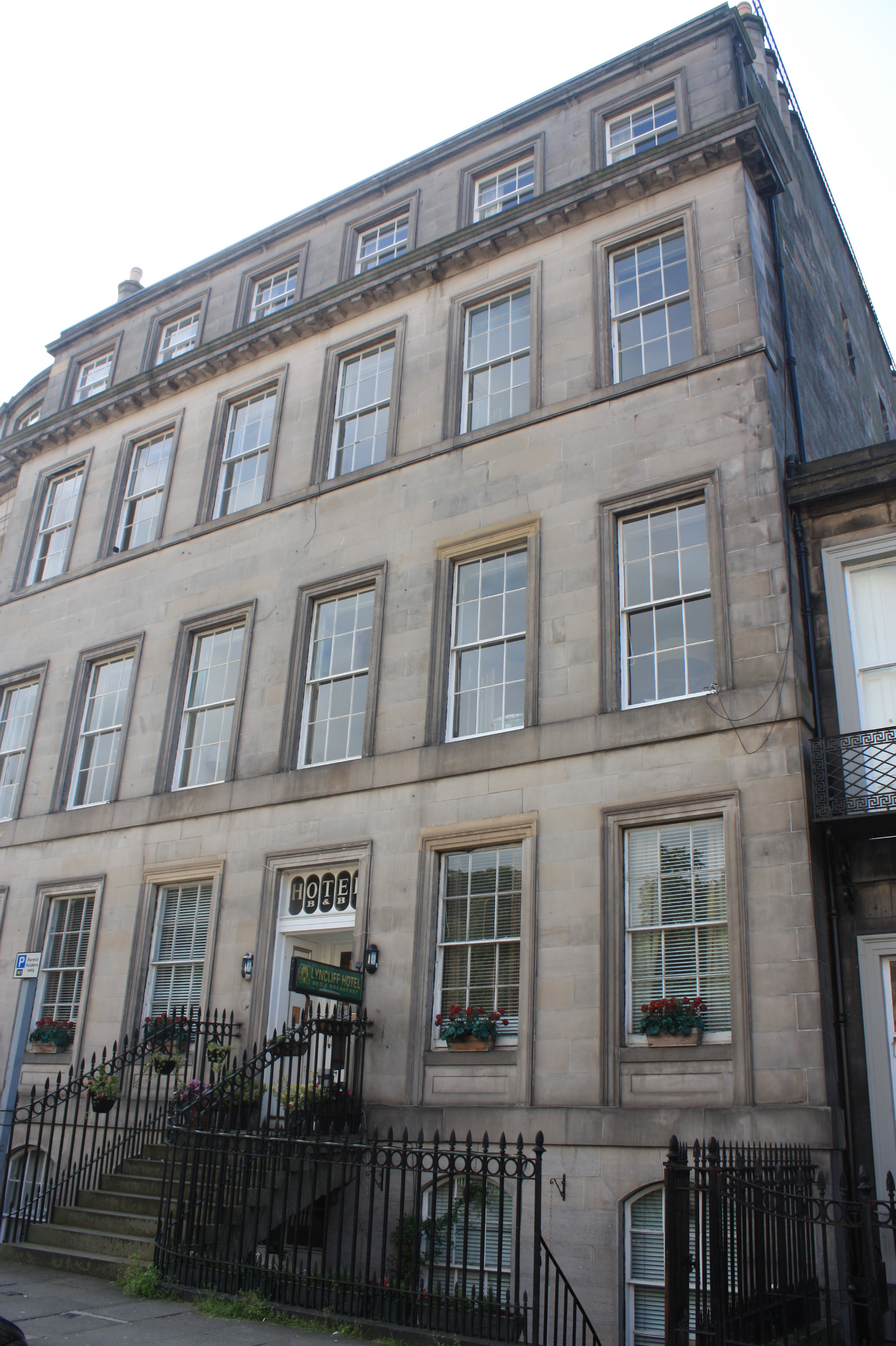
4 Windsor Street, Edinburgh

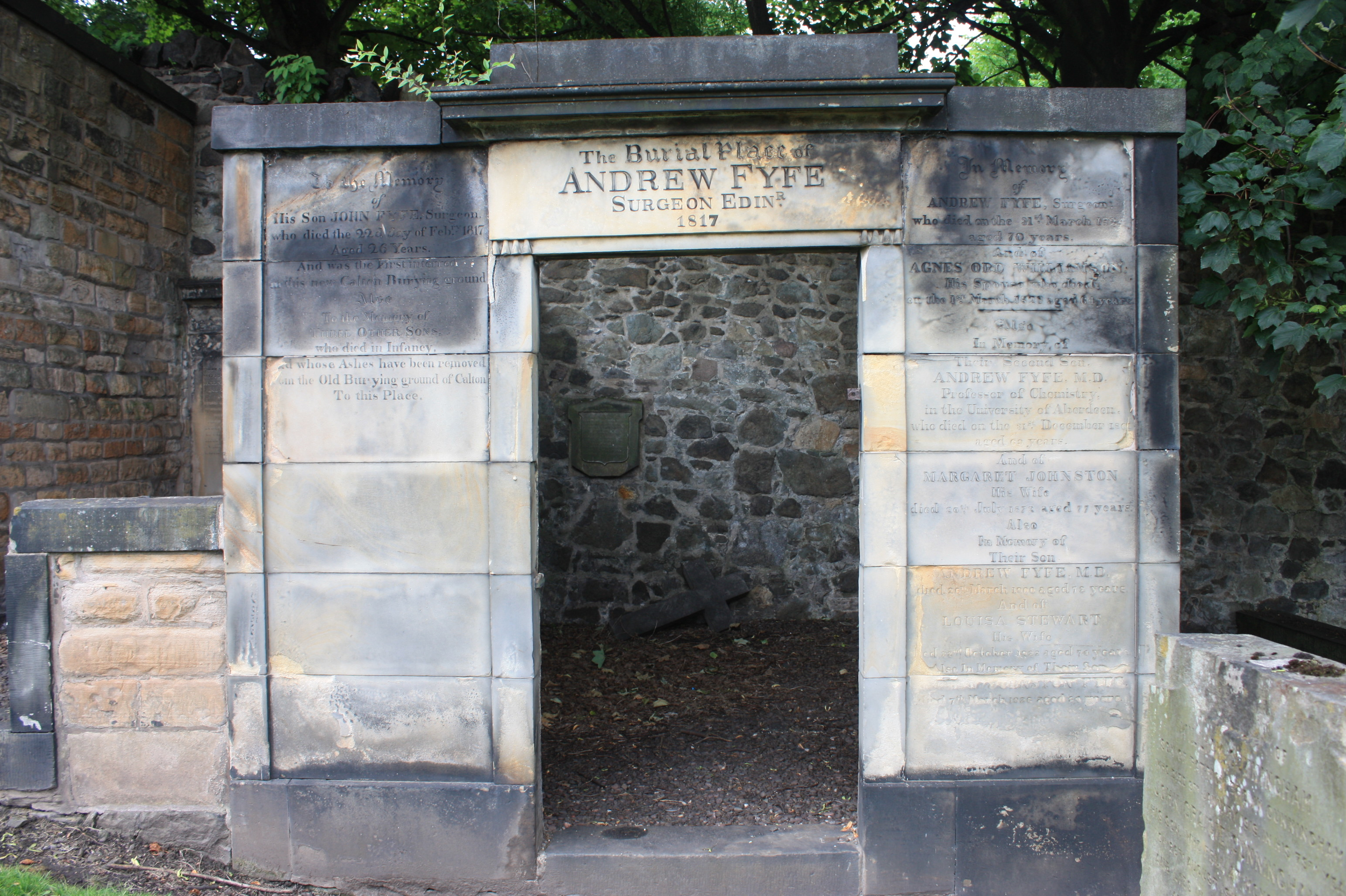
The burial vault of Andrew Fyfe, New Calton Cemetery, Edinburgh

Fyfe was born in Edinburgh on 18 January 1792, the son of Agnes Ord Williamson and Andrew Fyfe. He graduated with an MD at the University of Edinburgh in 1814, and became Fellow of the Edinburgh College of Surgeons in 1818, and was its president in 1842-43.

He lectured privately on chemistry and pharmacy at Edinburgh for many years, having been assistant to Professor Thomas Charles Hope.

He was elected a Fellow of the Royal Society of Edinburgh in 1823, his proposer being Thomas Charles Hope.

He was an unsuccessful candidate in 1832 for the Chair of Materia Medica at the University of Edinburgh, and again in 1844 for the Chair of Chemistry, which was filled by Professor William Gregory. He successfully applied for Gregory's vacated post as Professor of Chemistry at the University of Aberdeen. He retained this professorship till his death on 31 December 1861 in Edinburgh, however he stopped lecturing in the summer of 1860 due to ill health. His knowledge of inflammable substances was reputed, and he gave evidence in official inquiries on such subjects.

In the 1830s his address appears as 11 Teviot Row in Edinburgh. The building is now demolished. In the 1840s he is living at 38 George Square, Edinburgh.

In 1837 he was elected a member of the Harveian Society of Edinburgh. In 1840–41 he was elected President of the Royal Scottish Society of Arts. In 1842 he succeeded Dr Richard Huie as President of the Royal College of Surgeons of Edinburgh. In 1844 he was elected a member of the Aesculapian Club but resigned his membership in the same year.

He died at home at 4 Windsor Street, in east Edinburgh on 31 December 1861. He is buried in a family vault in New Calton Cemetery, with his second wife. The grave lies midway along the northern boundary wheel.

== Works ==
- Elements of Chemistry (1827) 2 vols. (3rd edit. 1833)
- Report on the Comparative Value of Kelp and Barilla
- Analyses on Four Specimens of Kelp
- On the Improvement of Kelp

== Family ==
He was twice married: firstly to Eliza Charles, secondly to Margaret Johnstone. He had a daughter by his first marriage. His son by the second marriage, was also named Andrew Fyfe, and was a London physician. A further son, John Fyfe (1891–1917) was also a surgeon, but died young.
