= 1941–42 Southern League Cup (Scotland) =

Scottish football tournament

The Southern League Cup 1941–42 was the second edition of the regional war-time football tournament.

== Group stage ==
=== Group A ===
Team	Pld	W	D	L	GF	GA	GD	Pts
Morton	6	4	1	1	14	11	+3	9
St Mirren	6	2	2	2	14	13	+1	6
Dumbarton	6	2	1	3	14	19	−5	5
Falkirk	6	1	2	3	13	12	+1	4

=== Group B ===
Team	Pld	W	D	L	GF	GA	GD	Pts
Celtic	6	5	0	1	15	7	+8	10
Hibernian	6	3	0	3	9	10	−1	6
Hamilton Academical	6	2	1	3	8	8	0	5
Queen's Park	6	1	1	4	7	14	−7	3

=== Group C ===
Team	Pld	W	D	L	GF	GA	GD	Pts
Partick Thistle	6	4	2	0	16	9	+7	10
Clyde	6	2	2	2	16	13	+3	6
Airdrieonians	6	1	2	3	11	13	−2	4
Albion Rovers	6	1	2	3	12	20	−8	4

=== Group D ===
Team	Pld	W	D	L	GF	GA	GD	Pts
Rangers	6	6	0	0	20	3	+17	12
Heart of Midlothian	6	4	0	2	17	10	+7	8
Motherwell	6	2	0	4	7	15	−8	4
Third Lanark	6	0	0	6	7	21	−14	0

== Semi-finals ==
Morton	1 – 0 (Rep.)	Partick Thistle	Ibrox Park, Glasgow
Rangers	2 – 0	Celtic	Hampden Park, Glasgow

== Final ==
9 May 1942

Morton	0–1	Rangers
		Gillick 28'

Hampden Park, Glasgow
Attendance: 43,000

=== Teams ===
Morton:
GK	Archie McFeat
RB	Matthew Maley
LB	Andy Fyfe
RH	Billy Campbell
CH	Willie Aird
LH	Jimmy Whyte
OR	John Kelly
IR	Tommy Orr
CF	John Hunter
IL	Billy Steel
OL	Horace Cumner

Rangers:
GK	Jerry Dawson
RB	Dougie Gray
LB	Jock Shaw
RH	Adam Little
CH	George Young
LH	George Thomson
OR	Willie Waddell
IR	Torry Gillick
CF	Billy McIntosh
IL	Alex Venters
OL	Charlie Johnston
