= Jackie Milne =

Scottish footballer and manager

Personal information
- Full name: John Vance Milne
- Date of birth: 25 March 1911
- Place of birth: Stirling, Scotland
- Date of death: 29 August 1959 (aged 48)
- Place of death: Mauchline, Scotland
- Position: Winger

Senior career*
Years	Team	Apps	(Gls)
- Ashfield
1932–1935	Blackburn Rovers	45	(13)
1935–1937	Arsenal	49	(19)
1937–1939	Middlesbrough	59	(7)
1939–1945	Dumbarton (wartime)	0	(0)
1946–1947	Asturias F.C.		

International career
1938–1939	Scotland	2	(0)

Managerial career
- 1945–1946: Dumbarton
- * Club domestic league appearances and goals

John Vance Milne (25 March 1911 – 29 August 1959) was a Scottish footballer who played for Blackburn Rovers, Arsenal and Middlesbrough. Arsenal won the old First Division in 1937–38 and he made 16 league appearances, enough for a winner's medal. He later played for Dumbarton for six seasons and was their manager for a seventh, but this was during the entire span of World War II and none of his 164 appearances there were in official competitions. At the end of the war, he accepted an invitation to play in Mexico, alongside Tom McKillop and Jimmy Hickie.

Milne represented Scotland twice.

== Honours ==
Arsenal

- Football League First Division: 1937-38
