= Robert Dougall (footballer) =

Scottish footballer

Personal information
- Date of birth: 21 January 1910
- Place of birth: Shieldhill, Scotland
- Date of death: 26 January 1988 (aged 78)
- Place of death: Falkirk, Scotland
- Height: 5 ft 10 in (1.78 m)
- Position: Right half

Senior career*
Years	Team	Apps	(Gls)
- Forth Rangers
1929–1933	Hamilton Academical	125	(5)
1933–1935	Blackpool	74	(2)
1937–1939	Reading	77	(7)
- * Club domestic league appearances and goals

Robert Dougall (21 January 1910 – 26 January 1988) was a Scottish professional footballer. A right half, he played in the English Football League for Blackpool and Reading. In Scotland he played for Hamilton Academical at the start of his senior career, and later featured as a wartime guest player for Dumbarton and hometown club Falkirk.
