= George Jeffrey =

Scottish footballer (1916–1979)

Personal information
- Date of birth: 15 August 1916
- Place of birth: Motherwell, Scotland
- Date of death: 1979 (aged 62)
- Place of death: Hamilton, Scotland
- Position: Inside left

Youth career
- Wishaw Juniors

Senior career*
Years	Team	Apps	(Gls)
1937–1939	Tottenham Hotspur	1	(1)
1939–1940	Motherwell	0	(0)
1940–1943	Dumbarton	0	(0)
- * Club domestic league appearances and goals

George Jeffrey (15 August 1916 – 1979) was a Scottish professional footballer who played for Wishaw Juniors, Tottenham Hotspur, Motherwell and Dumbarton.

== Football career ==
Jeffrey played for Wishaw Juniors before joining Tottenham Hotspur in 1937. The inside left scored one goal in one appearance for the 'Spurs', in a 3–2 victory over Plymouth Argyle at White Hart Lane in October 1937 in the old Second Division.

After leaving White Hart Lane, Jeffrey went on to play for Motherwell and later Dumbarton.
