= Sammy Ross =

Scottish footballer

Personal information
- Full name: Samuel Ross
- Date of birth: 13 November 1914
- Place of birth: Darvel, Scotland
- Date of death: 29 October 1973 (aged 58)
- Position: Wing half

Senior career*
Years	Team	Apps	(Gls)
1933–1939	Kilmarnock	166	(20)
1939–1940	Rangers		
1940–1942	Falkirk		
1940–1942	Dumbarton (wartime guest)	19	(5)
1942–1946	Motherwell		
1946	Dundee United	29	(2)
- Greenock Morton
- * Club domestic league appearances and goals

Samuel Ross (13 November 1914 – 29 October 1973) was a Scottish footballer who played as a wing half. Ross began his career in the mid-1930s with Kilmarnock, making over 150 league appearances and picking up a Scottish Cup runners-up medal during his six years at Rugby Park. At the end of the decade, Ross joined Rangers, leaving within a year to join Falkirk. Around 1942, Ross was registered with Motherwell, joining Dundee United in 1946, where he featured in 29 league games. After leaving Tannadice, Ross moved to Greenock Morton, which was his final senior club.

Ross died in 1973.
