= Andy Fyfe (footballer, born 1913) =

Scottish footballer

Personal information
- Date of birth: 24 October 1913
- Place of birth: Cambusnethan, Scotland
- Date of death: 27 January 1993 (aged 79)
- Position: Left back

Senior career*
Years	Team	Apps	(Gls)
- Parkhead
1934–1939	Kilmarnock	48	(0)
1939–1949	Greenock Morton		
- Newton Stewart
- * Club domestic league appearances and goals

Andy Fyfe (24 October 1913 – 27 January 1993) was a Scottish footballer who played as a left back. Fyfe began his career in the mid-1930s with Kilmarnock, making 48 Scottish Football League appearances and picking up a Scottish Cup runners-up medal in 1938. Fyfe joined Greenock Morton the following year and played for them during World War II and on the resumption of official competitions at the end of the conflict.
