= William Raeside =

Scottish football manager (1892–1964)

Personal information
- Date of birth: 24 March 1892
- Place of birth: Paisley, Scotland
- Date of death: 15 November 1964 (aged 72)
- Place of death: Old Kilpatrick, Scotland

Managerial career
- Years: Team
- 1927–1928: Celta Vigo
- 1937–1938: Nacional
- 1945–1947: Asturias
- 1947: Newell's Old Boys
- 1950–1951: Guadalajara
- 1952–1953: Cheltenham Town

William Raeside (24 March 1892 – 15 November 1964), also known as William Cowan and W. H. Cowan, was a Scottish football player and coach.

== Early and personal life ==
Raeside was born in Paisley on 24 March 1892.

== Playing career ==
Raeside's playing career, which included claims he played in both Scotland and England, is unverified.

== Coaching career ==
Raeside managed Spanish club Celta Vigo under a pseudonym, W. H. Cowan. After leaving Spain he returned to Scotland to work as an accountant.

In 1937 he moved to South America to coach Nacional of Uruguay. He returned to the United Kingdom to work as a scout for Arsenal. In 1945 he returned to Latin America to manage Mexican club Asturias. He moved to Argentina in 1947 with Newell's Old Boys, later returning to Mexico with Guadalajara in 1950. He returned to the United Kingdom to manage English club Cheltenham Town, before a brief return to Mexico to work with Atlante as a technical director. His last known involvement in football was an unsuccessful application to become Dundee United manager in 1954.

== Later life and death ==
Raeside died on 15 November 1964 in Old Kilpatrick, where he had retired to.

== Honours ==
Celta Vigo

- Galician Championship: 1927–28

Nacional

- Torneo Internacional Nocturno Rioplatense: 1938
