= John Gould (footballer) =

Scottish footballer (1919–1957)

Personal information
- Full name: John Daniel Gould
- Date of birth: 16 December 1919
- Place of birth: Cathcart, Scotland
- Date of death: 1957 (aged 37)
- Place of death: Glasgow, Scotland
- Position: Outside right

Youth career
- Neilston Victoria

Senior career*
Years	Team	Apps	(Gls)
1937–1940	Arbroath	38	(7)
1940–1946	Albion Rovers		
1946–1947	Arbroath		
1947–1948	Ayr United	9	(0)
1948	Stenhousemuir		
- * Club domestic league appearances and goals

John Daniel Gould (16 December 1919 – 1957) was a Scottish footballer who played for Arbroath, Celtic (wartime guest), Albion Rovers, Raith Rovers (wartime guest), Dumbarton (wartime guest), Ayr United and Stenhousemuir.
