= 1942–43 Southern League Cup (Scotland) =

Scottish football tournament

The 1942–43 Southern League Cup was the third edition of the regional war-time football tournament.

== Group stage ==
=== Group A ===
Team	Pld	W	D	L	GF	GA	GD	Pts
Falkirk	6	4	1	1	15	10	+5	9
Albion Rovers	6	3	2	1	11	6	+5	8
Morton	6	1	4	1	12	10	+2	6
Dumbarton	6	0	1	5	10	22	−12	1

=== Group B ===
Team	Pld	W	D	L	GF	GA	GD	Pts
Third Lanark	6	4	2	0	16	7	+9	10
Partick Thistle	6	4	1	1	16	5	+11	9
Motherwell	6	1	1	4	8	18	−10	3
Airdrieonians	6	1	0	5	8	18	−10	1

=== Group C ===
Team	Pld	W	D	L	GF	GA	GD	Pts
Hamilton Academical	6	5	1	0	23	9	+14	11
Clyde	6	3	1	2	9	9	0	7
Heart of Midlothian	6	1	2	3	6	13	−7	4
Queen's Park	6	0	2	4	9	16	−7	2

=== Group D ===
Team	Pld	W	D	L	GF	GA	GD	Pts
Rangers	6	6	0	0	14	1	+13	12
Hibernian	6	3	0	8	8	6	+2	8
Celtic	6	2	0	4	6	13	−7	4
St Mirren	6	1	0	4	8	14	−6	0

== Semi-finals ==
Rangers	3 – 0	Hamilton Academical	Hampden Park, Glasgow
Falkirk	3 – 1	Third Lanark	Ibrox Park, Glasgow

== Final ==
12 May 1943

Falkirk	1–1 (3–11 on corners)	Rangers
Inglis 50'		Gillick 42'

Hampden Park, Glasgow
Attendance: 18,000
Referee: R. Calder

=== Teams ===
Falkirk:
GK	James Matthews
RB	Alex White
LB	Alex Peat
RH	Henry Pinkerton
CH	Bob Shankly
LH	Charles Busby
OR	Duncan Ogilvie
IR	Bobby Campbell
CF	Jimmy Inglis
IL	John Fitzsimons
OL	Kenny Dawson

Rangers:
GK	Jerry Dawson
RB	Dougie Gray
LB	Jock Shaw
RH	Adam Little
CH	George Young
LH	Scot Symon
OR	Willie Waddell
IR	Jimmy Duncanson
CF	Torry Gillick
IL	Alex Venters
OL	Charlie Johnston
