= Benny Thomson =

British footballer

Personal information
- Full name: Benjamin Thomson
- Date of birth: 8 June 1913
- Place of birth: Saltcoats, Scotland
- Date of death: 12 November 1940 (aged 27)
- Place of death: North Atlantic Ocean
- Position: Winger

Senior career*
Years	Team	Apps	(Gls)
–	Kilwinning Rangers		
1934–1939	Kilmarnock	147	(39)
- * Club domestic league appearances and goals

Benjamin Thomson (8 June 1913 – 12 November 1940) was a Scottish professional footballer who played as a winger in the Scottish Football League for Kilmarnock. He featured in both matches of the replayed 1938 Scottish Cup Final, scoring in the second (the last of eight he scored in the competition, including two in the semi-final victory over Rangers) although his side lost 4–2 to East Fife.

== Personal life ==
Thomson was married and served as a fireman and trimmer in the Merchant Navy during the Second World War. Posted aboard the steamer SS Balmore, he was killed in action when the ship was sunk by German aircraft in the North Atlantic Ocean at position 52°N 17°W. Thomson is commemorated on the Tower Hill Memorial.

== Career statistics ==
Appearances and goals by club, season and competition
Club	Season	Division	League		Scottish Cup		Total	
Club	Season	Division	Apps	Goals	Apps	Goals	Apps	Goals
Kilmarnock	1934–35	Scottish Division One	10	0	0	0	10	0
Kilmarnock	1935–36	Scottish Division One	36	8	3	3	39	11
Kilmarnock	1936–37	Scottish Division One	38	11	1	0	39	11
Kilmarnock	1937–38	Scottish Division One	36	12	7	8	43	20
Kilmarnock	1938–39	Scottish Division One	27	8	2	1	29	9
Career total			147	39	13	12	160	51
