= 1941–42 Southern Football League (Scotland) =

The 1941–42 Southern Football League was the second edition of the regional war-time football league tournament.

== Table ==
Pos	Team	Pld	W	D	L	GF	GA	GD	Pts
1	Rangers (C)	30	22	4	4	97	35	+62	48
2	Hibernian	30	18	4	8	85	46	+39	40
3	Celtic	30	15	9	6	69	50	+19	39
4	Motherwell	30	16	3	11	76	62	+14	35
5	Clyde	30	13	6	11	79	75	+4	32
6	Heart of Midlothian	30	14	4	12	85	72	+13	32
7	Falkirk	30	13	4	13	60	72	−12	30
8	Third Lanark	30	14	2	14	79	90	−11	30
9	Morton	30	12	5	13	60	54	+6	29
10	Queen's Park	30	11	5	14	55	56	−1	27
11	St Mirren	30	10	7	13	60	82	−22	27
12	Dumbarton	30	11	4	15	73	90	−17	26
13	Partick Thistle	30	8	10	12	68	70	−2	26
14	Airdrieonians	30	10	4	16	57	76	−19	24
15	Albion Rovers	30	8	5	17	68	97	−29	21
16	Hamilton Academical	30	5	4	21	56	100	−44	14

Source: Scottish Football History – Southern Football League
Rules for classification: 1) points; 2) goal difference; 3) number of goals scored.
(C) Champions

== Results ==
Home \ Away	AIR	ALB	CEL	CLY	DUM	FAL	HAM	HOM	HIB	MORT	MOT	PAR	QPA	RAN	STM	THL
Airdrieonians		3–4	2–2	2–1	3–2	1–2	1–0	1–2	1–2	3–1	0–3	4–3	4–2	1–6	1–2	3–4
Albion Rovers	2–3		4–4	4–3	0–0	3–1	4–4	1–2	3–8	1–5	1–5	2–2	4–1	0–1	3–0	1–3
Celtic	3–3	4–2		5–2	4–2	2–0	2–1	4–4	2–1	2–0	1–2	1–1	2–0	0–2	3–0	3–1
Clyde	2–2	4–2	2–1		5–4	8–0	6–2	2–0	2–3	2–0	2–3	4–2	2–1	2–8	5–2	5–4
Dumbarton	3–5	5–2	2–5	6–0		0–1	3–2	3–3	2–1	3–1	2–1	2–7	2–1	3–3	5–1	1–5
Falkirk	3–0	2–4	0–1	4–3	3–1		5–1	2–6	1–2	5–2	1–0	2–1	3–5	2–2	0–0	3–2
Hamilton Academical	3–2	1–6	3–3	3–0	4–1	2–2		2–1	2–2	1–2	4–2	3–6	0–2	2–3	3–4	3–4
Heart of Midlothian	2–1	2–2	3–0	4–1	7–4	7–0	6–2		2–4	1–2	2–1	4–1	3–2	0–1	8–2	1–5
Hibernian	4–1	5–2	1–3	1–4	4–0	2–0	4–0	2–2		1–0	3–1	4–0	1–1	8–1	5–2	6–2
Morton	4–1	8–0	2–3	1–1	2–2	1–4	1–0	4–0	2–1		2–1	1–1	1–2	2–1	5–0	3–2
Motherwell	1–3	5–3	2–1	1–1	2–3	6–4	4–3	6–2	3–2	3–2		6–1	3–2	1–1	2–5	5–3
Partick Thistle	0–2	5–1	1–3	1–1	4–3	1–1	7–0	2–1	3–2	2–2	0–0		2–3	2–3	1–1	7–2
Queen's Park	2–2	2–0	1–1	1–3	1–2	3–1	3–1	4–1	1–2	2–0	3–1	2–2		1–2	1–2	4–1
Rangers	3–0	2–1	3–0	0–0	7–0	5–2	6–0	5–2	0–1	3–0	3–0	6–0	3–0		8–1	6–1
St Mirren	7–2	4–2	2–2	3–3	2–4	1–1	5–3	0–3	1–1	1–0	2–3	1–1	1–1	3–1		4–0
Third Lanark	2–0	3–4	1–1	5–3	4–3	0–3	3–1	6–4	4–2	4–4	0–4	3–2	4–1	0–2	3–1	

Source: Scottish Football History – Southern Football League
Legend: Blue = home team win; Yellow = draw; Red = away team win.
