= Felix McGrogan =

Scottish footballer

Personal information
- Full name: Felix McGrogan
- Date of birth: 27 July 1914
- Place of birth: Dumbarton
- Date of death: 13 December 1989 (aged 75)
- Place of death: Dumbarton
- Position: Winger

Youth career
- Renfrew

Senior career*
Years	Team	Apps	(Gls)
1935–1936	Blackburn Rovers		
1936–1937	Dunfermline Athletic		
1937–1938	Falkirk		
1937–1945	Kilmarnock	50	(18)
1940–1943	Dumbarton (wartime guest)	69	(30)
- * Club domestic league appearances and goals

Felix McGrogan (27 July 1914 – 13 December 1989) was a Scottish footballer who played for Blackburn Rovers, Dunfermline Athletic, Falkirk, Kilmarnock and Dumbarton.
