= 1942–43 Southern Football League (Scotland) =

The 1942–43 Southern Football League was the third edition of the regional war-time football league tournament.

== Table ==
| Pos | Team | Pld | W | D | L | GF | GA | GD | Pts |
|---|---|---|---|---|---|---|---|---|---|
| 1 | Rangers (C) | 30 | 22 | 6 | 2 | 89 | 23 | +66 | 50 |
| 2 | Morton | 30 | 20 | 5 | 5 | 81 | 48 | +33 | 45 |
| 3 | Hibernian | 30 | 19 | 6 | 5 | 86 | 40 | +46 | 44 |
| 4 | Clyde | 30 | 17 | 5 | 8 | 78 | 55 | +23 | 39 |
| 5 | Motherwell | 30 | 15 | 4 | 11 | 60 | 54 | +6 | 34 |
| 6 | Hamilton Academical | 30 | 14 | 5 | 11 | 60 | 67 | −7 | 33 |
| 7 | Heart of Midlothian | 30 | 12 | 7 | 11 | 68 | 64 | +4 | 31 |
| 8 | Falkirk | 30 | 12 | 6 | 12 | 68 | 58 | +10 | 30 |
| 9 | Celtic | 30 | 10 | 8 | 12 | 61 | 76 | −15 | 28 |
| 10 | Dumbarton | 30 | 11 | 6 | 13 | 76 | 76 | 0 | 28 |
| 11 | Partick Thistle | 30 | 9 | 8 | 13 | 63 | 67 | −4 | 26 |
| 12 | St Mirren | 30 | 8 | 5 | 17 | 49 | 78 | −29 | 21 |
| 13 | Third Lanark | 30 | 8 | 4 | 18 | 58 | 83 | −25 | 20 |
| 14 | Queen's Park | 30 | 7 | 4 | 19 | 55 | 76 | −21 | 18 |
| 15 | Airdrieonians | 30 | 7 | 3 | 20 | 55 | 97 | −42 | 17 |
| 16 | Albion Rovers | 30 | 6 | 4 | 20 | 53 | 99 | −46 | 16 |

Source: Scottish Football History – Southern Football League
Rules for classification: 1) points; 2) goal difference; 3) number of goals scored.
(C) Champions

== Results ==
| Home \ Away | AIR | ALB | CEL | CLY | DUM | FAL | HAM | HOM | HIB | MORT | MOT | PAR | QPA | RAN | STM | THL |
|---|---|---|---|---|---|---|---|---|---|---|---|---|---|---|---|---|
| Airdrieonians | | 4–4 | 1–5 | 0–1 | 1–0 | 3–1 | 1–2 | 2–4 | 0–5 | 2–5 | 3–1 | 3–5 | 3–4 | 1–7 | 3–1 | 4–0 |
| Albion Rovers | 5–3 | | 4–4 | 1–5 | 3–4 | 1–4 | 3–1 | 1–3 | 1–4 | 1–5 | 1–2 | 1–5 | 3–1 | 0–4 | 5–1 | 2–2 |
| Celtic | 2–3 | 4–0 | | 1–1 | 2–2 | 2–2 | 2–2 | 3–0 | 0–3 | 0–2 | 3–2 | 3–3 | 2–1 | 2–2 | 3–2 | 3–2 |
| Clyde | 3–2 | 5–0 | 1–3 | | 6–2 | 1–0 | 2–0 | 2–2 | 7–2 | 2–3 | 1–3 | 4–1 | 2–4 | 1–3 | 4–2 | 2–0 |
| Dumbarton | 3–3 | 6–1 | 4–2 | 6–2 | | 2–2 | 2–2 | 2–2 | 1–4 | 0–3 | 5–3 | 4–1 | 3–3 | 1–2 | 4–0 | 5–3 |
| Falkirk | 5–2 | 7–2 | 6–0 | 1–2 | 5–4 | | 0–4 | 2–2 | 3–1 | 4–1 | 7–0 | 2–1 | 2–1 | 0–5 | 1–1 | 2–1 |
| Hamilton Academical | 2–1 | 3–2 | 2–1 | 3–3 | 2–1 | 3–2 | | 3–2 | 1–3 | 0–2 | 3–2 | 2–2 | 3–1 | 0–3 | 3–2 | 4–2 |
| Heart of Midlothian | 5–2 | 5–1 | 5–3 | 1–3 | 0–1 | 3–2 | 4–0 | | 1–4 | 5–2 | 1–6 | 3–3 | 1–0 | 0–3 | 4–2 | 3–1 |
| Hibernian | 7–1 | 3–1 | 4–0 | 2–2 | 4–1 | 4–0 | 3–1 | 2–2 | | 2–2 | 2–1 | 0–0 | 4–0 | 1–1 | 3–2 | 5–1 |
| Morton | 3–3 | 2–1 | 4–0 | 3–1 | 1–3 | 3–1 | 3–2 | 2–0 | 1–0 | | 1–2 | 2–1 | 3–1 | 1–1 | 8–0 | 6–2 |
| Motherwell | 4–0 | 1–0 | 2–1 | 2–2 | 0–2 | 3–0 | 5–2 | 3–2 | 2–1 | 1–4 | | 1–1 | 1–1 | 0–2 | 1–1 | 5–2 |
| Partick Thistle | 2–0 | 6–3 | 2–3 | 1–3 | 2–1 | 0–3 | 4–4 | 2–2 | 1–5 | 1–3 | 1–2 | | 2–1 | 0–2 | 8–1 | 2–1 |
| Queen's Park | 3–5 | 1–4 | 2–2 | 3–5 | 4–2 | 1–0 | 0–2 | 3–2 | 2–3 | 2–2 | 0–2 | 2–3 | | 1–0 | 0–2 | 6–2 |
| Rangers | 4–0 | 3–1 | 8–1 | 0–1 | 1–0 | 1–0 | 1–1 | 4–2 | 1–1 | 1–1 | 7–0 | 2–1 | 5–2 | | 5–1 | 4–2 |
| St Mirren | 3–0 | 0–0 | 0–2 | 1–3 | 5–2 | 2–2 | 4–1 | 2–1 | 1–2 | 1–2 | 2–2 | 2–1 | 3–2 | 0–1 | | 2–2 |
| Third Lanark | 1–0 | 1–3 | 4–2 | 2–1 | 7–3 | 4–1 | 1–2 | 1–2 | 3–2 | 2–2 | 2–0 | 1–1 | 2–1 | 0–3 | 3–4 | |

Source: Scottish Football History – Southern Football League
Legend: Blue = home team win; Yellow = draw; Red = away team win.

== Sources ==
- Scottish Football History – Southern Football league
