= Original Glasgow derby =

Football rivalry in Glasgow, Scotland

Glasgow derby
- Location: Glasgow, Scotland
- Teams: Queen's Park; Rangers
- First meeting: 1875; Charity game for fire victims
- Latest meeting: 8 February 2026; Scottish Cup; Rangers 8–0 Queen's Park

Statistics
- Total meetings: 109
- Most wins: Rangers (80)
- Largest victory: Rangers 8–0 Queen's Park (1973–74 Scottish Cup); Rangers 8–0 Queen's Park (2025–26 Scottish Cup)

The Original Glasgow derby is the name for the old rivalry between crosstown Scottish football clubs Queen's Park and Rangers, both based in Glasgow. The two clubs are two of the most successful in the Scottish Cup, and the rivalry between them was one of the more intense in the early years of Scottish football, before being overtaken by the Old Firm rivalry from the 1900s onwards. The highest Scottish Cup attendance figure for the fixture was recorded on 18 January 1930 at Hampden Park for the first round, when 95,722 fans attended. The two clubs met in the top flight for last time during 1957–58, the final season before Queen's Park's relegation. The club retained their amateur status from their foundation in 1867 until 2019, which meant it was extremely difficult to compete at the highest level and the intensity of the derby dramatically declined after 1958 as the Spiders never returned to the top tier.

On 20 October 2012, the old derby was revived again in league football after 54 years in the Scottish Third Division following Rangers' expulsion from the top flight in 2012 – the attendance figure for their first meeting was a world record for a fourth division match at the time as 49,463 fans were present at Ibrox Stadium to see fourth placed Rangers overcome early leaders Queen's Park 2–0. Their first league fixture at Hampden since 1958 took place 29 December 2012, attracting 30,117 fans. This was the first five-figure attendance Queen’s Park had recorded for 29 years and would have been higher if the stadium was not operating at reduced capacity due to upgrading work on the North Stand.

The most recent meeting between the clubs was a fifth round Scottish Cup match played on 8 February 2026. Rangers ran out comfortably 8–0 against the lower league opposition, almost exactly a year to the day since Queens Park's historic upset.

== History ==
=== 1875–1900: Early years ===
A match between the two clubs officially came to records in an 1875 friendly to raise money for the victims of a huge fire in Bridgeton that had claimed many lives. After meeting in the final of the inaugural Glasgow Merchants Charity Cup in 1877, the first major competitive fixture between the sides was a 1878–79 Scottish Cup quarter-final tie on 22 March 1879 at the first Hampden Park with Rangers winning 1–0 and advancing to the semifinal. That game was nine years before Celtic even came into existence. In the 1879–80 season Queen's Park recorded their largest victory against their rivals in a Cup replay, dominating the match 5–1 on 27 September 1879 at the first Hampden in front of 5,000 spectators. The first match finished in a 0–0 draw a week earlier at Rangers' home at Kinning Park, in front of 7,000 fans. Two years later on 30 September 1882 Queen's Park would beat their rivals again by 3-2 in second round of the Scottish Cup at the first Hampden.

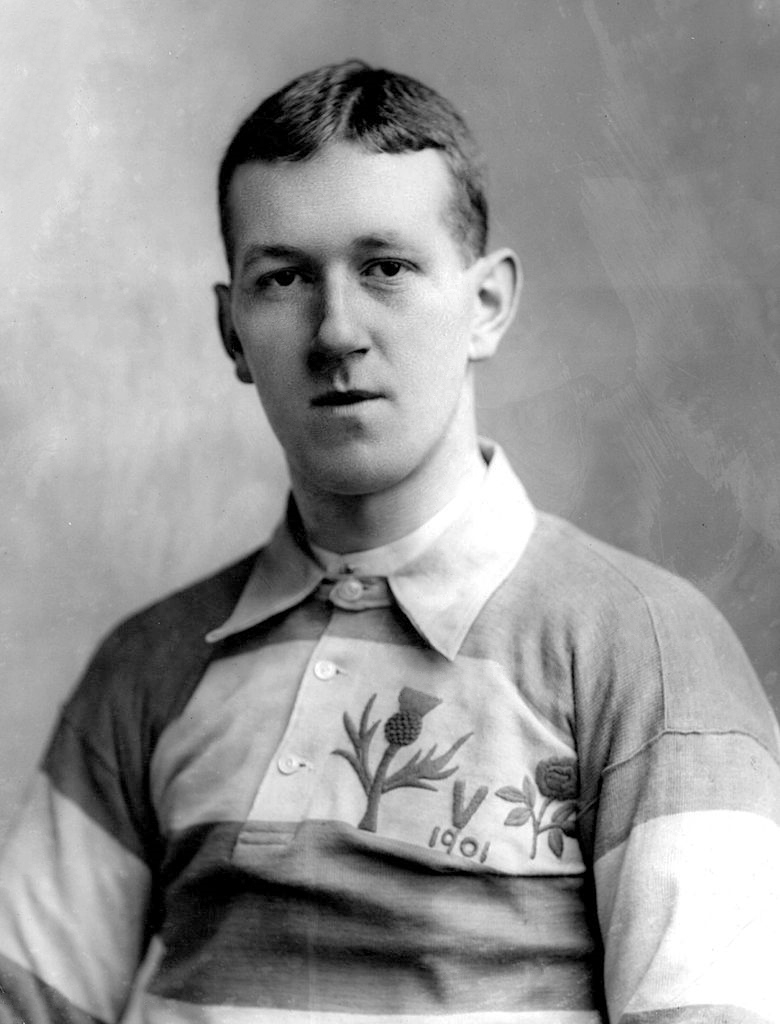
Robert Smyth McColl had two spells at Queen's Park and one at Rangers

In 1890 Rangers were part of the inaugural league season in Scottish football and Queen's Park joined the league 10 years later in 1900, remaining there with some interruptions until 1958. But between 1895 and 1899 and the two clubs would face each other in the Glasgow Football League: Rangers won the title in 1896 and 1898 and Queen's Park in 1897. They also played against each other in the Glasgow Cup: in 1898 Rangers beat Queen's Park 4–0 in the final and the next year the Spiders took their revenge winning the local trophy with a narrow 1–0 victory.

Queen's Park started competing in the Scottish Cup from its first edition in 1873–74 and proved the most successful team for the first three decades of Scottish football, winning the trophy 10 times. That success instantly made the Spiders one of the best supported football clubs in Glasgow. Rangers started competing in the Scottish Cup in 1874–75 which for a second consecutive time finished with Queen's Park as the winners. The latter won the cup for the last time in 1893, beating Celtic in the final. On the other hand the Gers won it for first time the following year in 1894, overcoming Queen's Park in the semi-final after a replay, though it took them until 1948 to reach 11 wins and surpass their old rivals' record (Celtic had done so by 1925).

=== 1900–1939: Division One ===
From 1900 until 1939 the two teams would play every year against each other in the Scottish League Division One – with the exception of the 1922–23 when Queen's Park competed in the second division. Their first meeting in the top flight took place at Ibrox Park on 29 September 1900, with Rangers winning the match 3–2 in front of 16,000 spectators. On 22 October 1904 Rangers recorded their largest victory at the time beating their rivals home 5–0 in the league. Nevertheless in the 1907–08 season Queen's Park held Rangers to a 1–1 draw on 30 September 1907 in the first tied league game between the two, and on 2 November 1907 they won 3–1 at Ibrox for a first ever league victory in the derby.

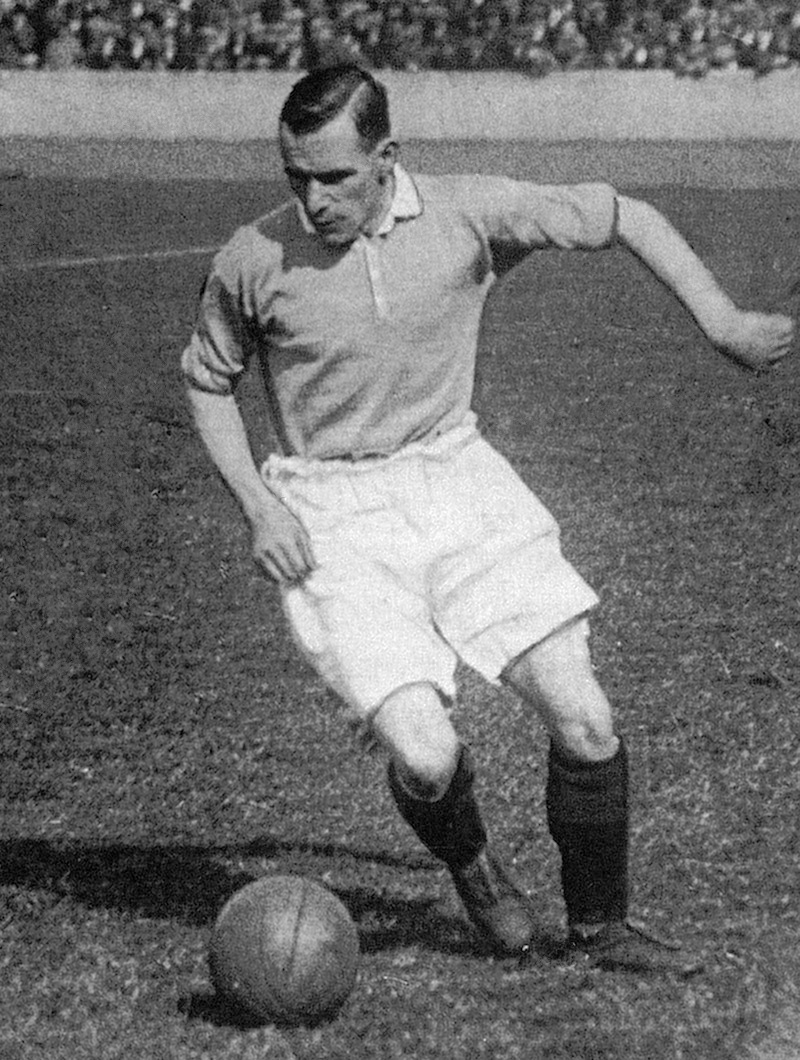
Alan Morton played over 200 times for Queen's Park and over 400 times for Rangers

After many years without a derby win Queen's Park would succeed with a victorious away performance on 10 March 1926 with a 2–1 scoreline, just their fourth league derby win at the time. They reached the semi-finals of the Scottish Cup in 1928 but lost 2–1 to holders Celtic at Ibrox; they would have faced Rangers in the final, but instead it was an Old Firm affair (the Gers won 4–0 to lift the trophy for the first time since 1903, the 25-year hiatus being almost as lengthy as that of Queen's Park at the time). They did meet in the 1932 Glasgow Cup final which attracted 50,000 fans to the stadium in a match that the Gers won easily, 3–0. The 1938–39 season was the last one before World War II with Rangers winning the title and Queen's Park finishing at the bottom of the table – but they were never relegated as there was no official football action the following year.

=== 1939–1946: Wartime ===
During the World War II the two clubs faced each other in the 1939–40 Scottish War Emergency League, the Southern Football League, and the Southern Football League Cup from 1940 until 1946; Rangers won all three trophies several times. The league cup tournament was divided in groups of four and the two rivals met in the 1944–45 season when they faced each other in the semi-final match at Hampden which Rangers won 3–0 on 21 April 1945 in front of 70,000 spectators. They also met in the Summer Cup.

=== 1946–1958: Post-war ===
In 1946 the football action resumed officially but Queen's Park were relegated for a second time in its history in 1948. The Original Glasgow derby was resumed eight years later in the 1956–57 season with Queen's Park returning to the highest tier and playing in a memorable battle with Rangers which ended in a 6–4 victory for the Govan side, who went on to win the title. The last season the two teams competed in the top flight was in 1957–58 with Queen's Park finishing bottom of the table and Rangers as runners-up. This was Alex Ferguson's debut campaign with Queen's Park, and he would later join Rangers in 1967.

=== 1958–1992: Decline ===
Following Queen's Park's relegation the derby lost its importance as Glasgow's biggest fixture after the Old Firm matches. Their next meeting was in the 1973–74 Scottish Cup when Rangers achieved their biggest victory ever against the Spiders: 8–0. On 12 March 1983, the Gers won narrowly 2–1 at Hampden Park in the quarter-finals of the Scottish Cup in front of 13,716 fans. The two rivals still faced each other in the increasingly irrelevant Glasgow Cup during the 1980s. Their last meeting prior to Rangers' 2012 removal from the top tier took place on 20 August 1991 in the Scottish League Cup when they beat Queen's Park 6–0 at Ibrox in the second round of the competition in front of a crowd of 32,230 fans.

=== 2012–13: A brief revival ===
In 2012, Rangers endured severe financial difficulties, and its holding company was put into liquidation while the team had to apply for entry to the bottom (fourth) tier of the Scottish league. That development meant that the two old rivals would be in the same division for the first time since the 1957–58 season. Both would be fighting for promotion in the 2012–13 Scottish Third Division. Another historical local club, Clyde, was part of the league that season, bringing in a glimpse of the glorious past of Glaswegian football. On 29 December 2012 Queen's Park came close to their first draw against the Gers in 70 years (since the 1932–33 season), but Fraser Aird scored in the 92nd minute to give Rangers a 1–0 win at Hampden Park. Overall, Rangers won all four fixtures against Queen's Park, finishing as champions while the Spiders qualified for the play-offs but failed to win promotion.

=== 2014–15 League Cup ===
On 26 August 2014 Queen's Park hosted Rangers in the first round of the 2014–15 Scottish League Cup at the Excelsior Stadium in Airdrie (Hampden was being used for the 2014 Commonwealth Games at the time). That season Rangers were competing just one level higher than their opponents as they attempted to climb back through the divisions of Scottish football (this was achieved after three promotions in four seasons). They managed to beat Queen's Park 2–1 and advanced to the semi-final, where they lost to Celtic.

=== 2024–25 Scottish Cup: A historic upset ===
On 9 February 2025, Rangers hosted Queen's Park at Ibrox Stadium in the fifth round of the 2024–25 Scottish Cup. In the shock of the tournament, a second half strike by Seb Drozd, a stout defensive performance from the Spiders and a last-minute penalty save by goalkeeper Calum Ferrie from James Tavernier gave Scotland's oldest team an 1–0 away victory and a spot in the quarter-finals for the first time in 42 years. The result marked the first Scottish Cup victory for Queen's Park over Rangers since 1882, Rangers' first defeat against lower league opposition since their infamous loss to Berwick Rangers in the 1966–67 Scottish Cup, and the first home defeat to lower league opposition in the competition in their entire history.

=== 2025–26 Scottish Cup ===
On 8 February 2026, Rangers hosted Queen's Park in the fifth round of the 2025–26 Scottish Cup at Ibrox Stadium. Almost exactly a year on since Queen's Park's historic upset in the same round. Rangers ran out comfortably 8−0 to progress into the quarter finals.

== Honours ==
Queen's Park	Competition	Rangers
Domestic
-	Scottish first-tier League	55
2	Scottish second-tier League	1
1	Scottish third-tier League	1
2	Scottish fourth-tier League	1
10	Scottish Cup	34
-	Scottish League Cup	28
-	Scottish Challenge Cup	1
8	Glasgow Merchants Charity Cup	32
1	Glasgow Football League	2
4	Glasgow Cup	44
-	Drybrough Cup	1
12	Scottish Amateur Cup	-
39	Aggregate	155
European and Worldwide
—	UEFA Cup Winners' Cup	1
-	Aggregate	1
39	Total Aggregate	156

== All-time head-to-head record ==
Updated on 8 February 2026

Competition	First match	Played	Rangers	Queen's Park	Draw
Scottish Division One	1900	84	62	9	13
Scottish Third Division	2012	4	4	0	0
Scottish Cup	1879	17	10	3	4
League Cup	1946	4	4	0	0
Totals		109	80	12	17

=== Defunct minor competitions ===
There are a number of matches between the two clubs that are not recognised in the official records.

Competition	Years	Played	Rangers	Queen's Park	Draw
Glasgow Cup (Note: The Glasgow Cup continued to be contested during World War I and World War II)	1887–1987	40	31	6	5
Glasgow Merchants Charity Cup (Note: The Glasgow Merchants Charity Cup continued to be contested during World War I and World War II)	1892–1961	31	19	9	3
Glasgow League / Inter City League	1895–1906	18	11	3	4
Lord Provost's Cup	1921	1	1	0	0
Totals		90	62	18	12

=== Wartime competitions ===
During the Second World War, the Scottish Football League and Scottish Cup were suspended and in their place unofficial regional league competitions were set up and they were mostly dominated by Rangers.

Competition	Years	Played	Rangers	Queen's Park	Draw
Emergency Western League	1939–1940	2	2	0	0
Southern League	1940–1946	12	8	2	2
Southern League Cup	1940–1946	1	1	0	0
Summer Cup	1940–1946	0	0	0	0
Totals		15	11	2	2

== Biggest wins ==
=== Queen's Park ===
League

- Queen's Park 3–1 Rangers on 29 October 1927

Scottish Cup

- Queen's Park 5–1 Rangers on 27 September 1879

Scottish League Cup

- Queen's Park have never beaten Rangers in the Scottish League Cup

Glasgow Cup

- Rangers 0–3 Queen's Park on 7 November 1891
- Rangers 0–3 Queen's Park on 15 September 1906

=== Rangers ===
League

- Rangers 7–1 Queen's Park on 20 November 1909
- Queen's Park 0–6 Rangers on 28 February 1914

Scottish Cup

- Rangers 8–0 Queen's Park on 26 January 1974
- Rangers 8–0 Queen's Park on 8 February 2026

League Cup

- Rangers 6–0 Queen's Park on 20 August 1991

Glasgow Cup

- Rangers 7–1 Queen's Park on 14 October 1968

== Match with most goals ==
- Queen's Park 4–6 Rangers on 22 April 1957, Scottish Football League

== Attendances ==
The highest ever attendance between the two old rivals was recorded in the first round of the 1929–30 Scottish Cup on 18 January 1930 at Hampden Park: 95,722 spectators were present. One year earlier, on 12 January 1929 the Original Glasgow derby attracted 60,000 who watched Rangers beat Queen's Park 4–0. On 21 April 1945, in a Southern League Cup semi-final during wartime, 70,000 flocked to the Celtic Park to watch Rangers beat Queen's Park 3–0 to advance to the final. In total, in at least nine games, the attendance was between 40,000 and 95,000, the most recent being in 2013 in the Scottish Third Division: on 20 October 2012, 49,463 fans revived the atmosphere of the old derby at Ibrox Stadium, a figure that at the time was a world record for a fourth division match. When the two teams met in the 1973–74 Scottish Cup, their first cup meeting in 20 years Rangers easily beat second-tier Queen's Park at Hampden, still attracting 19,000 fans to the national stadium to watch the game.

=== Highest attendances ===
Date	Match	Venue	Attendance	Competition
18 January 1930	Queen's Park 0–1 Rangers	Hampden Park	95,722	Scottish Cup first round
21 April 1945	Rangers 3–0 Queen's Park	Celtic Park	70,000	Southern League Cup semi-final
12 January 1929	Queen's Park 0–4 Rangers	Hampden Park	60,000	1928–29 Scottish Division One
17 October 1931	Queen's Park 0–3 Rangers	Hampden Park	50,376	Glasgow Cup final
31 May 1919	Queen's Park 1–2 Rangers	Hampden Park	50,000	Glasgow Merchants Charity Cup final
20 October 2012	Rangers 2–0 Queen's Park	Ibrox Stadium	49,463	2012–13 Scottish Third Division
13 February 2013	Rangers 4–0 Queen's Park	Ibrox Stadium	46,104	2012–13 Scottish Third Division
13 February 1933	Queen's Park 1–3 Rangers	Hampden Park	45,217	Scottish Cup second round, replay 2
20 February 1909	Rangers 1–0 Queen's Park	Ibrox Park	45,000	Scottish Cup quarter-final
22 November 1919	Queen's Park 0–0 Rangers	Hampden Park	45,000	1919–20 Scottish Football League

== Individual records ==
=== Highest goalscorers ===
As of end of the 2019–20 season. Including Southern league.

- League games only

Rank	Name	Club	Goals	Years
1	Andy Cunningham	Rangers	14	1915-1928
2	Willie Reid	Rangers	11	1909-1920
3	Bob McPhail	Rangers	10	1927-1940
3	Jimmy Smith	Rangers	10	1928-1946
3	Alex Venters	Rangers	10	1933-1946
6	Jimmy Fleming	Rangers	9	1925-1934
7	Robert Hamilton	Rangers	7	1897-1906
7	James Marshall	Rangers	7	1925-1934
7	Torry Gillick	Rangers	7	1933-1935, 1945-1951
10	Johnny Hubbard	Rangers	6	1949-1959
10	Jimmy Duncanson	Rangers	6	1946-1950
10	Willie Waddell	Rangers	6	1939-1955

- Queen's Park topscorer was James McAlpine with 5 goals (1919-1934).

== Finals ==
The two old rivals have met in several final and semifinal games, from 1877 until 1957.

=== Scottish Cup ===
The Scottish Cup was first played in 1874 and Queen's Park were the inaugural winners, lifting 10 trophies between 1874 and 1893. Their decision to stick with amateurism and not turn professional meant that more success in the competition was impossible to come by. Nevertheless, it was over 40 years later, in 1936, that Rangers equalled the Spiders' record (Celtic overtook it in 1925). The two clubs never played against each other in a final but they clashed in three semi-finals: Rangers beat Queen's Park to advance to the final in 1879, 1894 (in a replay) and in 1933 (after two replays).

=== Glasgow Cup ===
Rangers beat Queen's Park in the finals of 1898, 1932, 1940 and 1985. On the other hand Queen's Park won the 1899 final against their rivals. In total, Rangers won 44 trophies and the Spiders 4, with their last one being in 1946.

Club	Finals won	Winning years
Rangers	4	1898, 1932, 1940, 1985
Queen's Park	1	1899

=== Glasgow Merchants Charity Cup ===
Queen's Park were also the first ever winners of the Glasgow Merchants Charity Cup in 1877. They beat Rangers in the final on their first five meetings in 1877, 1878, 1880, 1881 and 1883. The next final they faced each other was in 1906. Rangers won that and the next 8 against Queen's Park, with the last being in 1957. In the 1922-23 Glasgow Merchants Charity Cup, Queen's Park reached the final against the Gers though they were playing in the second division that season. Overall, Rangers lifted the trophy 32 times and Queen's Park 8. The latter were the record holders for 31 years until 1908 when Celtic won their 9th. Between 1891, the year of their last trophy and 1957 they played in 18 finals, losing all of them.

Club	Finals won	Winning years
Rangers	9	1906, 1919, 1922, 1923, 1928, 1931, 1933, 1955, 1957
Queen's Park	5	1877, 1878, 1880, 1881, 1883

== Notable players who played for both clubs ==
Player	Queen's Park	Rangers
(Scotland) William Aitken	1916 to 1918	1918 to 1919
(Scotland) Cammy Bell	2020	2013 to 2016
(Scotland) James Bowie	1908 to 1910	1910 to 1922
(Scotland) Bobby Brown	1939 to 1946	1946 to 1956
(Scotland) Bob Campbell	1904 to 1905	1906 to 1914
(Scotland) Billy Chalmers	1922 to 1924	1924 to 1928
(Scotland) Sammy Cox	1944 to 1946	1946 to 1956
(Scotland) Alex Ferguson	1957 to 1960	1967 to 1969
(Scotland) George Gillespie	1883 to 1891	1876 to 1883
(Scotland) Derek Grierson	1948 to 1952	1952 to 1956
(Scotland) Alexander Hamilton	1884 to 1889	1882 to 1884
(Scotland) James Hamilton	1884 to 1894	1894 to 1895
(Scotland) Robert Hamilton	1896 to 1897	1897 to 1906
(Scotland) John Little	1948 to 1951	1951 to 1962
(Scotland) James Logan	1903 to 1904	1912 to 1917
(Scotland) Bob McColl	1894 to 1901, 1907 to 1912	1904 to 1907
(Scotland) Alan Morton	1913 to 1920	1920 to 1933
(Scotland) Max Murray	1953 to 1955	1955 to 1962
(Scotland) Willie Nicholson	1924 to 1929	1929 to 1935
(Scotland) Peter Pursell	1913 to 1914	1914 to 1919
(Scotland) Andrew Richmond	1903 to 1910, 1913	1910 to 1913
(Scotland) Donald Sillars	1891 to 1894	1890 to 1891
(Scotland) Johnny Valentine	1953 to 1957	1957 to 1958

== See also ==
- Sport in Glasgow
- Association football culture
- List of sports rivalries
- List of association football rivalries
- Sport in Scotland
- Timeline of Glasgow history
