= 1941–42 Rangers F.C. season =

Rangers
1941–42 season
- Chairman: James Bowie
- Manager: Bill Struth
- Ground: Ibrox Park
- Southern League: 1st P30 W22 D4 L4 F97 A35 Pts48
- Southern League Cup: Winners
- Summer Cup: Runners-up
- Top goalscorer: League: Willie Thornton, Jimmy Duncanson (18); All: Willie Thornton, Jimmy Duncanson (25)
Home colours	Away colours

The 1941–42 season was the 3rd year of wartime football by Rangers.

== Results ==
All results are written with Rangers' score first.

=== Southern League ===
Date	Opponent	Venue	Result	Attendance	Scorers
9 August 1941	Motherwell	H	3–0		
16 August 1941	Partick Thistle	A	3–2		
30 August 1941	Airdrieonians	A	6–1		
6 September 1941	Celtic	H	3–0		
13 September 1941	Third Lanark	A	2–0		
20 September 1941	Falkirk	H	5–2		
27 September 1941	Hibernian	A	1–8		
4 October 1941	Albion Rovers	A	1–0		
11 October 1941	Dumbarton	H	7–0		
25 October 1941	Queen's Park	H	3–0		
1 November 1941	Morton	A	1–2		
8 November 1941	Hamilton Academical	A	3–2		
15 November 1941	Heart of Midlothian	H	5–2		
22 November 1941	Motherwell	A	1–1		
29 November 1941	Partick Thistle	H	6–0		
6 December 1941	St Mirren	A	1–3		
13 December 1941	Airdrieonians	H	3–0		
20 December 1941	Falkirk	A	2–2		
27 December 1941	Hibernian	H	0–1		
1 January 1942	Celtic	A	2–0		
3 January 1942	Third Lanark	H	5–1		
17 January 1942	Dumbarton	A	3–3		
31 January 1942	Clyde	H	0–0		
14 February 1942	Hamilton Academical	H	6–0		
21 February 1942	Heart of Midlothian	A	1–0		
6 April 1942	Clyde	A	8–2		
14 April 1942	Morton	H	3–0		
21 April 1942	Queen's Park	A	2–1		
28 April 1942	Albion Rovers	H	2–1		

=== Southern League Cup ===
Date	Round	Opponent	Venue	Result	Attendance	Scorers
28 February 1942	SR	Third Lanark	H	5–1		
14 March 1942	SR	Motherwell	A	3–1		
21 March 1942	SR	Third Lanark	A	5–2		
28 March 1942	SR	Heart of Midlothian	H	2–1		
4 April 1942	SR	Motherwell	H	3–0		
11 April 1942	SR	Heart of Midlothian	A	2–0		
2 May 1942	SF	Celtic	N	2–0		
9 May 1942	F	Morton	N	1–0		

=== Summer Cup ===
Date	Round	Opponent	Venue	Result	Attendance	Scorers
30 May 1942	R1 L1	Hamilton Academical	A	7–1		
6 June 1942	R1 L2	Hamilton Academical	H	3–2		
13 June 1942	R2 L1	Falkirk	A	0–1		
20 June 1942	R2 L2	Falkirk	H	3–0		
27 June 1942	SF	Albion Rovers	N	3–2		
4 July 1942	F	Hibernian	N	2–2		

== See also ==
- 1941–42 in Scottish football
- 1941–42 Southern League Cup (Scotland)
