= 1943–44 Rangers F.C. season =

Rangers
1943–44 season
- Chairman: James Bowie
- Manager: Bill Struth
- Ground: Ibrox Park
- Southern League: 1st P30 W23 D4 L3 F90? A27 Pts50
- Southern League Cup: Winners
- Top goalscorer: League: Willie Thornton, Jimmy Duncanson (18); All: Willie Thornton, Jimmy Duncanson (25)

The 1943–44 season was the 5th year of wartime football by Rangers.

== Results ==
All results are written with Rangers' score first.

=== Southern League ===
Date	Opponent	Venue	Result	Attendance	Scorers
14 August 1943	Hibernian	H	4–0		
21 August 1943	Motherwell	A	5–0		
4 September 1943	Airdrieonians	A	3–1		
11 September 1943	Celtic	H	0–1		
18 September 1943	Third Lanark	A	6–0		
25 September 1943	Falkirk	H	2–0		
2 October 1943	St Mirren	A	4–1		
16 October 1943	Heart of Midlothian	H	1–3		
23 October 1943	Morton	A	1–1		
30 October 1943	Hamilton Academical	H	6–0		
6 November 1943	Albion Rovers	A	5–1		
13 November 1943	Queen's Park	A	4–1		
20 November 1943	Dumbarton	H	2–0		
27 November 1943	Hibernian	A	4–3		
4 December 1943	Motherwell	H	2–0		
11 December 1943	Partick Thistle	A	2–1		
18 December 1943	Airdrieonians	H	3–0		
25 December 1943	Third Lanark	H	3–1		
1 January 1944	Celtic	A	3–1		
3 January 1944	Dumbarton	A	1–1		
8 January 1944	Falkirk	A	0–2		
15 January 1944	St Mirren	H	1–2		
22 January 1944	Clyde	A	3–0		
29 January 1944	Heart of Midlothian	A	3–1		
5 February 1944	Morton	H	4–1		
12 February 1944	Hamilton Academical	A	4–1		
19 February 1944	Albion Rovers	H	5–0		
26 February 1944	Queen's Park	H	1–1		
10 April 1944	Partick Thistle	H	3–3		

=== Southern League Cup ===
Date	Round	Opponent	Venue	Result	Attendance	Scorers
4 March 1944	SR	Heart of Midlothian	A	4–2		
11 March 1944	SR	Motherwell	H	0–1		
18 March 1944	SR	Airdrieonians	A	1–0		
25 March 1944	SR	Heart of Midlothian	H	2–0		
1 April 1944	SR	Motherwell	A	3–2		
8 April 1944	SR	Airdrieonians	H	4–0		
29 April 1944	SF	Celtic	N	4–2	87,000	
20 May 1944	F	Hibernian	N	0–0 (5-6 corners)	63,000	

== See also ==
- 1943–44 in Scottish football
- 1943–44 Southern League Cup (Scotland)
