= 1940–41 Rangers F.C. season =

Rangers
1940–41 season
- Chairman: James Bowie
- Manager: Bill Struth
- Ground: Ibrox Park
- Southern League: 1st P30 W21 D4 L5 F79 A33 Pts46
- Southern League Cup: Winners
- Summer Cup: Runners-up
- Top goalscorer: League: Willie Thornton, Jimmy Duncanson (18); All: Willie Thornton, Jimmy Duncanson (25)

The 1940–41 season was the 2nd season of wartime football by Rangers.

== Results ==
All results are written with Rangers' score first.

=== Southern League ===
Date	Opponent	Venue	Result	Attendance	Scorers
10 August 1940	Falkirk	A	3–1		
17 August 1940	Hibernian	H	5–1		
31 August 1940	Partick Thistle	H	3–1		
7 September 1940	Celtic	A	0–0		
14 September 1940	Airdrieonians	H	2–0		
21 September 1940	St Mirren	H	3–0		
5 October 1940	Hamilton Academical	H	2–0		
12 October 1940	Heart of Midlothian	A	1–1		
19 October 1940	Albion Rovers	H	2–0		
26 October 1940	Dumbarton	A	4–1		
2 November 1940	Queen's Park	A	5–0		
9 November 1940	Clyde	H	3–2		
16 November 1940	Morton	H	5–4		
23 November 1940	Falkirk	H	4–0		
30 November 1940	Hibernian	A	0–1		
7 December 1940	Motherwell	H	2–3		
14 December 1940	Partick Thistle	A	4–1		
21 December 1940	St Mirren	A	0–2		
28 December 1940	Airdrienonians	A	2–0		
1 January 1941	Celtic	H	2–3		
4 January 1941	Third Lanark	A	1–0		
18 January 1941	Heart of Midlothian	H	3–0		
25 January 1941	Albion Rovers	A	7–2		
1 February 1941	Dumbarton	H	1–1		
8 February 1941	Queen's Park	H	1–1		
15 February 1941	Clyde	A	3–0		
22 February 1941	Morton	A	4–2		
12 April 1941	Hamilton Academical	A	4–1		
28 April 1942	Third Lanark	H	0–3		

=== Southern League Cup ===
Date	Round	Opponent	Venue	Result	Attendance	Scorers
1 March 1941	SR	Falkirk	H	4–0		
8 March 1941	SR	Dumbarton	A	8–1		
15 March 1941	SR	Third Lanark	H	3–0		
22 March 1941	SR	Falkirk	A	1–2		
29 March 1941	SR	Dumbarton	H	6–2		
5 April 1941	SR	Third Lanark	A	2–1		
19 April 1941	SF	St Mirren	N	4–1	36,000	
10 May 1941	F	Heart of Midlothian	N	1–1	69,000	
17 May 1941	F R	Heart of Midlothian	N	4–2	90,428	

=== Summer Cup ===
Date	Round	Opponent	Venue	Result	Attendance	Scorers
7 June 1941	R1 L1	Falkirk	A	3–2		
14 June 1941	R1 L2	Falkirk	H	3–1		
21 June 1941	R2 L1	Hamilton Academical	A	3–1		
28 June 1941	R2 L2	Hamilton Academical	H	5–5		
5 July 1941	SF	Heart of Midlothian	N	4–2		
12 July 1941	F	Hibernian	N	2–3		

== See also ==
- 1940–41 in Scottish football
- 1940–41 Southern League Cup (Scotland)
