= 1935–36 Rangers F.C. season =

Rangers
1935–36 season
- Chairman: James Bowie
- Manager: Bill Struth
- Ground: Ibrox Park
- Scottish League Division One: 2nd P38 W27 D7 L4 F110 A43 Pts61
- Scottish Cup: Winners
- Top goalscorer: League: Willie Thornton, Jimmy Duncanson (18); All: Willie Thornton, Jimmy Duncanson (25)

The 1935–36 season was the 62nd season of competitive football by Rangers.

== Overview ==
Rangers finished second in the league behind rivals Celtic. Rangers would win the Scottish Cup.

== Results ==
All results are written with Rangers' score first.

=== Scottish League Division One ===
Date	Opponent	Venue	Result	Attendance	Scorers
10 August 1935	Arbroath	H	6–0	11,000	
14 August 1935	Albion Rovers	A	2–1	10,000	
17 August 1935	Ayr United	A	2–2	18,000	
24 August 1935	Dundee	H	4–3	18,000	
28 August 1935	St Johnstone	H	7–0	15,000	
31 August 1935	Partick Thistle	A	3–1	30,000	
7 September 1935	Airdrieonians	H	5–3	16,000	
14 September 1935	Hibernian	A	1–1	18,000	
21 September 1935	Celtic	H	1–2	72,000	
28 September 1935	Motherwell	A	2–0	15,000	
5 October 1935	Dunfermline Athletic	H	6–2	12,000	
19 October 1935	Heart of Midothian	H	1–1	26,000	
26 October 1935	Clyde	A	4–1	14,000	
2 November 1935	Queen's Park	H	3–3	16,000	
9 November 1935	Queen of the South	A	2–0	10,700	
16 November 1935	Hamilton Academical	H	3–1	16,000	
23 November 1935	Aberdeen	A	0–1	33,578	
30 November 1935	Kilmarnock	H	2–1	8,000	
7 December 1935	St Johnstone	A	2–1	12,000	
14 December 1935	Albion Rovers	H	5–1	6,000	
21 December 1935	Arbroath	A	0–0	8,000	
28 December 1935	Ayr United	H	6–1	8,000	
1 January 1936	Celtic	A	4–3	65,000	
2 January 1936	Partick Thistle	H	3–1	25,000	
4 January 1936	Dundee	A	3–0	23,000	
11 January 1936	Airdrieonians	A	2–0	14,000	
1 February 1936	Motherwell	H	0–0	35,000	
15 February 1936	Dunfermline Athletic	A	6–2	8,500	
29 February 1936	Third Lanark	H	4–2	15,000	
14 March 1936	Clyde	H	4–1	21,000	
18 March 1936	Hibernian	H	3–0	7,000	
21 March 1936	Queen's Park	A	3–1	27,546	
8 April 1936	Queen of the South	H	2–1	5,000	
11 April 1936	Hamilton Academical	A	0–1	12,000	
13 April 1936	Third Lanark	A	3–1	12,000	
22 April 1936	Heart of Midlothian	A	1–1	28,811	
25 April 1936	Kilmarnock	A	3–0	7,000	
29 April 1936	Aberdeen	H	2–3	12,000	

=== Scottish Cup ===
Date	Round	Opponent	Venue	Result	Attendance	Scorers
29 January 1936	R1	East Fife	H	3–1	3,000	
8 February 1936	R2	Albion Rovers	A	3–1	27,381	
22 February 1936	R3	St Mirren	A	2–1	43,308	
7 March 1936	R4	Aberdeen	A	1–0	42,663	
28 March 1936	SF	Clyde	N	3–0	56,243	
18 April 1936	F	Third Lanark	N	1–0	88,859	

== See also ==
- 1935–36 in Scottish football
- 1935–36 Scottish Cup
