= 1944–45 Dumbarton F.C. season =

Dumbarton
1944–1945 season
- Stadium: Boghead Park, Dumbarton
- Scottish Southern League: 13th
- Summer Cup: First Round
- League Cup South: Prelims
- Top goalscorer: League: Willie Reid (13); All: Willie Reid (15)

The 1944–45 season was the sixth Scottish football season in which Dumbarton competed in regional football during World War II.

== Scottish Southern League ==
Four seasons of improving performances were not to be continued, with Dumbarton suffering a disastrous start to their fifth season in the Southern League campaign which saw only 3 points earned from the first 11 games. Things were not helped by a high 'turn-over' of playing staff and Dumbarton slumped to 13th out of 16 in the Scottish Southern League with 21 points - 38 behind champions Rangers.

12 August 1944 League	Motherwell	4–3	Dumbarton	Fir Park
	Gibson 19'; Kilmarnock 44' (pen.); Gillan 61'; Mathie 82'		Stead 8'; Brooks 35'; Reid 38'	Attendance: 5,000; Referee: J Martin

19 August 1944 League	Dumbarton	4–1	Partick Thistle	Boghead Park
	Brooks 48', 55'; Reid 52'; Timmins 78'		Sharp 6'	Attendance: 5,500; Referee: J Thomson

26 August 1944 League	St Mirren	4–2	Dumbarton	Love Street (stadium)
	Linwood 47', 59'; Lindsay 50'; McKenna 58'		Brooks 28'; McLean 77'	Attendance: 7,000

2 September 1944 League	Dumbarton	0–3	Hibernian	Boghead Park
			Cheyne 44' (o.g.); Colvan 55'; Smith 73'	Attendance: 3,500; Referee: M Dale

9 September 1944 League	Falkirk	5–1	Dumbarton	Brockville Park
	Fitzsimmons 20', 65', 69'; Inglis 32'; Bagan 42' (pen.)		McLean 27'	Attendance: 4,000; Referee: J Calder

16 September 1944 League	Dumbarton	0–3	Celtic	Boghead Park
			Gallacher 10', 86'; Delaney 17'	Attendance: 7,000; Referee: C R Blae

23 September 1944 League	Airdrie	2–1	Dumbarton	Broomfield Park
	Aitken 40'; Ferguson 49'		Brooks 23'	Attendance: 3,000

30 September 1944 League	Dumbarton	2–5	Third Lanark	Boghead Park
	Timmins 40', 42'		McIntosh 15'; Dawson 18', 67', 85'; Orr 25'	Attendance: 3,000; Referee: W Livingston

7 October 1944 League	Dumbarton	2–2	Queen's Park	Boghead Park
	Mooney 35' (pen.); Timmins 58'		Hodge 11', 44'	Attendance: 2,500

14 October 1944 League	Hearts	4–0	Dumbarton	Tynecastle Stadium
	Conn 29'; Kelly 68', 77'; Urquhart 80'			Attendance: 5,000

21 October 1944 League	Dumbarton	0–4	Morton	Boghead Park
			McAloon 19', 38'; Kelly 29'; Crum 70'	Attendance: 5,000

28 October 1944 League	Albion Rovers	2–4	Dumbarton	Cliftonhill
	McIlhatton 21', 44'		Reid 1'; Hepburn 72', 85'; Brooks 74'	Attendance: 1,000; Referee: J Cox

11 November 1944 League	Rangers	5–2	Dumbarton	Ibrox Park
	Duncanson 30'; Waddell 33', 53'; Symon 35'; Watkins 78'		Dolan 31'; Brawley 71'	Attendance: 12,000; Referee: F Scott

18 November 1944 League	Dumbarton	3–0	Clyde	Boghead Park
	Reid 28', 42'; Milne 55'			Attendance: 6,000

25 November 1944 League	Dumbarton	2–6	Motherwell	Boghead Park
	Marshall 44', 62'		Watson 15'; McCulloch 16', 50'; Mathie 46', 86'; Ross 75'	Attendance: 6,000; Referee: C Blues

2 December 1944 League	Partick Thistle	1–2	Dumbarton	Firhill Park
	Sharp 43'		Reid 30'; Brooks 86'	Attendance: 5,000

9 December 1944 League	Dumbarton	3–1	St Mirren	Boghead Park
	Murphy 47'; Reid 49'; Pritchard 75'		Linwood 29'	Attendance: 4,000; Referee: C R Blues

16 December 1944 League	Hibernian	0–0	Dumbarton	Easter Road Stadium
				Attendance: 5,000

23 December 1944 League	Dumbarton	2–0	Airdrie	Boghead Park
	Reid 5' (pen.), 79'			Attendance: 2,500; Referee: J Thomson

30 December 1944 League	Celtic	2–1	Dumbarton	Celtic Park
	McLaughlin 16', 28'		Marshall 75'	Attendance: 9,000

1 January 1945 League	Dumbarton	1–4	Falkirk	Boghead Park
	Brawley (pen.)		Fizsimmons 10' (pen.); Henderson 23'; Bagan

2 January 1945 League	Clyde	7–1	Dumbarton	Broadwood Stadium
	Johnstone; Johnstone, L		Timmins

6 January 1945 League	Third Lanark	0–2	Dumbarton	Cathkin Park
			Marshall 44'; McMillan 52'	Attendance: 5,000

13 January 1945 League	Queen's Park	2–0	Dumbarton	Hampden Park
	Harris 32', 88'			Attendance: 4,000

3 February 1945 League	Dumbarton	3–2	Albion Rovers	Boghead Park
	Filshie 8'; Pritchard 35', 60'		Hannah 45', 80'	Attendance: 2,000; Referee: M Dale

10 February 1945 League	Hamilton	3–3	Dumbarton	Douglas Park
	Jarvie 5'; Jones 50'; Burns 59' (pen.)		Reid 26', 31'; Murphy 58'	Attendance: 1,000

17 February 1945 League	Dumbarton	3–6	Rangers	Boghead Park
	Milne 41'; Murphy 85'; Gray 88' (o.g.)		Gillick 10', 28'; Duncanson 17', 57', 61'; Young 81' (pen.)	Attendance: 4,000

7 April 1945 League	Morton	2–1	Dumbarton	Cappielow Park
	Henderson 26'; McInnes 74'		Reid 55'	Attendance: 5,000

21 April 1945 League	Dumbarton	3–2	Hearts	Boghead Park
	Hepburn 12'; Boyd 38'; Reid 72' (pen.)		Walker 77'; Kelly 88'	Attendance: 1,300

28 April 1945 League	Dumbarton	0–2	Hamilton	Boghead Park
			Goal

== League Cup South ==
Dumbarton again failed to escape from their qualifying section in the League Cup South, winning one and drawing two of their qualifying matches.

24 February 1945 Group D	Motherwell	2–1	Dumbarton	Fir Park
	Mathie 5', 19'		Murphy 44'	Attendance: 4,000; Referee: M Dale

3 March 1945 Group D	Dumbarton	0–0	Hearts	Boghead Park
				Attendance: 4,000

10 March 1945 Group D	Dumbarton	5–1	St Mirren	Boghead Park
	Hepburn 20'; Murphy 25'; Brawley 52' (pen.), 87' (pen.); Reid 80'		Feeham 40'	Attendance: 3,000

17 March 1945 Group D	Dumbarton	2–2	Motherwell	Boghead Park
	Hepburn 48'; Pritchard 51'		Kilmarnock 55' (pen.); McCulloch 89'	Attendance: 7,000; Referee: F Scott

24 March 1945 Group D	Hearts	6–2	Dumbarton	Tynecastle Stadium
	Kelly 2', 19', 82'; McCrae 8'; Miller 41' (pen.); McClure 73'		Reid 47'; Brawley 80' (pen.)	Attendance: 15,000

31 March 1945 Group D	St Mirren	3–1	Dumbarton	Love Street (stadium)
	Linwood 5'; Feehan 25', 36'		Filshie 21'	Attendance: 3,000

== Summer Cup ==
Dumbarton suffered another first round defeat in the Summer Cup, this time to Partick Thistle.

26 May 1945 Cup 1(1)	Partick Thistle	4–4	Dumbarton	Firhill Park
	Stockdale 16', 57'; Shankley 31' (pen.); McGeachie 75'		Murphy 7', 58'; Hepburn 9'; Browning 85'	Attendance: 7,000; Referee: J Calder

2 June 1945 Cup 1(2)	Dumbarton	1–2 (5–6 agg.)	Partick Thistle	Boghead Park
	Timmins 5'		Johnson 24', 60'	Attendance: 5,000; Referee: C Blues

== Player statistics ==
No.	Pos	Nat	Player	Total		Southern Division		Summer Cup		League Cup	
No.	Pos	Nat	Player	Apps	Goals	Apps	Goals	Apps	Goals	Apps	Goals
	GK	(Scotland) SCO	Brendan Bell	2	0	2	0	0	0	0	0
	GK	(Scotland) SCO	James Dover	9	0	9	0	0	0	0	0
	GK	(Scotland) SCO	Stan Gullan	7	0	7	0	0	0	0	0
	GK	(Scotland) SCO	Jim Hoey	16	0	8	0	2	0	6	0
	GK	(Scotland) SCO	David Watson	4	0	4	0	0	0	0	0
	DF	(Scotland) SCO	Andy Cheyne	12	0	12	0	0	0	0	0
	DF	(Scotland) SCO	James Hoy	7	0	7	0	0	0	0	0
	DF	(Scotland) SCO	Alex Kay	26	0	18	0	2	0	6	0
	DF	(Scotland) SCO	John Mulvaney	4	0	4	0	0	0	0	0
	DF	(Scotland) SCO	Robert Wallace	25	0	19	0	0	0	6	0
	MF	(Scotland) SCO	Tom Brawley	28	5	23	2	0	0	5	3
	MF	(Scotland) SCO	John Browning	2	1	0	0	2	1	0	0
	MF	(Scotland) SCO	John Craig	6	0	5	0	0	0	1	0
	MF	(Scotland) SCO	Bobby Donaldson	4	0	1	0	0	0	3	0
	MF	(Scotland) SCO	Frank Douglas	2	0	0	0	2	0	0	0
	MF	(Scotland) SCO	Andrew Easton	1	0	1	0	0	0	0	0
	MF	(Scotland) SCO	Hugh Hart	3	0	3	0	0	0	0	0
	MF	(England) ENG	Cliff Mansley	1	0	1	0	0	0	0	0
	MF	(Scotland) SCO	Andrew McAlpine	3	0	3	0	0	0	0	0
	MF	(Scotland) SCO	Gordon McFarlane	2	0	0	0	0	0	2	0
	MF	(Scotland) SCO	Jackie Milne	22	2	14	2	2	0	6	0
	MF	(Scotland) SCO	Willie Reid	33	15	27	13	0	0	6	2
	MF	(Scotland) SCO	Jimmy Timmins	23	6	22	5	1	1	0	0
	FW	(Scotland) SCO	Robert Torrance	8	0	8	0	0	0	0	0
	FW	(Scotland) SCO	Andrew Boyd	2	1	2	1	0	0	0	0
	FW	(Scotland) SCO	George Brooks	20	7	19	7	0	0	1	0
	FW	(Scotland) SCO	George Campbell	27	0	19	0	2	0	6	0
	FW	(Scotland) SCO	Dolan	1	1	1	1	0	0	0	0
	FW	(Scotland) SCO	Alexander Filshie	9	2	6	1	2	0	1	1
	FW	(Scotland) SCO	John Hepburn	28	6	21	3	2	1	5	2
	FW	(Scotland) SCO	Donald MacMillan	8	1	8	1	0	0	0	0
	FW	(Scotland) SCO	Ernest Marshall	15	4	11	4	1	0	3	0
	FW	(Scotland) SCO	Victor McAloney	1	0	1	0	0	0	0	0
	FW	(Scotland) SCO	Jimmy McGowan	2	0	0	0	2	0	0	0
	FW	(Scotland) SCO	Albert McLean	5	0	5	0	0	0	0	0
	FW	(Scotland) SCO	Mooney	7	1	7	1	0	0	0	0
	FW	(Scotland) SCO	Robert Murphy	26	7	19	3	2	2	5	2
	FW	(Scotland) SCO	Vince Pritchard	8	4	4	3	0	0	4	1
	FW	(Scotland) SCO	Angus Stead	6	1	6	1	0	0	0	0
	FW	(Scotland) SCO	Trialists	3	0	3	0	0	0	0	0

=== Transfers ===
==== Players in ====
Player	From	Date
(Scotland) Andrew Easton	(Scotland) Slamannan	11 May 1944
(Scotland) Willie Reid	(Scotland) Cowdenbeath	24 May 1944
(Scotland) James Dover	(Scotland) Pollok	5 Aug 1944
(Scotland) George Campbell	(Scotland) Vale of Leven	11 Oct 1944
(Scotland) Robert Murphy	(Scotland)	27 Oct 1944
(Scotland) Ernest Marshall	(Scotland) Hibernian	18 Nov 1944
(Scotland) Donald McMillan	(Scotland) Bridgeton Waverley	16 Dec 1944
(Scotland) Stan Gullan	(Scotland) Amateur	22 Dec 1944
(Scotland) James Hoey	(Scotland) Bridgeton Waverley	5 Jan 1945
(Scotland) Gordon MacFarlane	(Scotland)	30 Jan 1945
(Scotland) Victor McAloney	(Scotland) Tontine Hibs	27 Mar 1945
(Scotland) James McGowan	(Scotland) Clyde	23 May 1945
(Scotland) John Browning	(Scotland) Cowdenbeath	26 May 1945
(Scotland) Jimmy Timmins	(Scotland) Glasgow Perthshire	

==== Players out ====
Player	To	Date
(Scotland) James Anderson	(Scotland) Released	30 Aug 1944
(Scotland) Brendon Bell	(Scotland) Released	4 Nov 1944
(Scotland) Frank Douglas	(Scotland) Released	15 Dec 1944
(Scotland) Albert McLean	(Scotland) Released	10 Jan 1945
(Scotland) Angus Stead	(Scotland) Released	15 Jan 1945
(Scotland) James Dover	(Scotland) Released	20 Jan 1945
(Scotland) Andrew Easton	(Scotland) Amateur	22 Jan 1945
(Scotland) Hugh Hart	(Scotland) Dunfermline Athletic (loan)	27 Jan 1945
(Scotland) Andrew McAlpine	(Scotland) Raith Rovers	6 Feb 1945
(Scotland) Thomas Lipton	(Scotland)	

== Reserve team ==
Dumbarton's Second XI had similar disappointing fortunes during the season to the first team.

In the Scottish Second XI Cup, Dumbarton lost in the first round to Falkirk, and finished 9th (of 11) in the Glasgow & District Reserve League.
