= 1942–43 Rangers F.C. season =

Rangers
1942–43 season
- Chairman: James Bowie
- Manager: Bill Struth
- Ground: Ibrox Park
- Southern League: 1st P30 W22 D6 L2 F89 A23 Pts50
- Southern League Cup: Winners
- Summer Cup: Runners-up
- Top goalscorer: League: Willie Thornton, Jimmy Duncanson (18); All: Willie Thornton, Jimmy Duncanson (25)

The 1942–43 season was the fourth year of wartime football by Rangers.

== Results ==
All results are written below, with Rangers' score first.

=== Southern League ===
Date	Opponent	Venue	Result	Attendance	Scorers
8 August 1942	St Mirren	A	1–0		
15 August 1942	Airdrieonians	H	4–1		
29 August 1942	Third Lanark	H	4–2		
12 September 1942	Hibernian	H	1–1		
19 September 1942	Albion Rovers	H	3–0		
26 September 1942	Dumbarton	A	2–1		
3 October 1942	Queen's Park	A	0–1		
17 October 1942	Morton	H	7–0		
24 October 1942	Hamilton Academical	H	4–2		
31 October 1942	Heart of Midlothian	A	3–0		
7 November 1942	Motherwell	A	2–0		
14 November 1942	Partick Thistle	H	4–1		
21 November 1942	St Mirren	H	5–1		
28 November 1942	Airdrieonians	A	7–1		
5 December 1942	Falkirk	H	1–1		
12 December 1942	Third Lanark	A	3–0		
19 December 1942	Albion Rovers	A	4–0		
26 December 1942	Hibernian	A	1–1		
1 January 1943	Celtic	H	8–1		
3 January 1943	Queen's Park	H	5–2		
5 January 1943	Dumbarton	H	1–0		
16 January 1943	Clyde	A	3–1		
23 January 1943	Morton	A	1–1		
30 January 1943	Hamilton Academical	A	3–0		
6 February 1943	Heart of Midlothian	H	1–1		
13 February 1943	Motherwell	H	2–1		
20 February 1943	Partick Thistle	A	2–0		
10 April 1943	Celtic	H	2–2		
26 April 1943	Clyde	H	0–1		

=== Southern League Cup ===
Date	Round	Opponent	Venue	Result	Attendance	Scorers
27 February 1943	SR	St Mirren	A	3–0		
6 March 1943	SR	Celtic	H	3–0		
13 March 1943	SR	Hibernian	A	2–0		
20 March 1944	SR	St Mirren	H	5–1		
27 March 1943	SR	Celtic	A	2–0		
3 April 1943	SR	Hibernian	H	1–0		
24 April 1943	SF	Hamilton Academical	N	3–0		
8 May 1943	F	Falkirk	N	1–1 (11-3 corners)		

=== Summer Cup ===
Date	Round	Opponent	Venue	Result	Attendance	Scorers
29 May 1943	R1 L1	Heart of Midothian	H	3–0		
5 June 1943	R1 L2	Heart of Midothian	A	2–1		
12 June 1943	R2 L1	Celtic	A	4–0		
19 June 1943	R2 L2	Celtic	H	4–1		
26 June 1943	SF	Hibernian	N	3–1		
10 July 1943	F	St Mirren	N	0–1		

== See also ==
- 1942–43 in Scottish football
- 1942–43 Southern League Cup (Scotland)
