= 1909–10 Rangers F.C. season =

Rangers
1909–10 season
- Chairman: James Henderson
- Manager: William Wilton
- Ground: Ibrox Park
- Scottish League Division One: 3rd P34 W20 D6 L8 F70 A35 Pts46
- Scottish Cup: Second round
- Top goalscorer: League: Willie Hunter (19); All: Willie Hunter (19)

The 1909–10 season was the 36th season of competitive football by Rangers.

== Overview ==
Rangers played a total of 40 competitive matches during the 1909–10 season. The side finished third in the league, eight points behind champions Celtic, after winning 20 of the 34 matches.

Their Scottish Cup campaign ended in a second round 2–0 defeat away to Clyde, having previously overcome Inverness Thistle in the first.

== Results ==
All results are written with Rangers' score first.

=== Scottish League Division One ===
Date	Opponent	Venue	Result	Attendance	Scorers
16 August 1909	Kilmarnock	H	3–0	18,000	A.Smith, Reid, Hunter
21 August 1909	Airdrieonians	A	1–2	13,000	Hogg
29 August 1909	St Mirren	H	1–1	16,000	Bennett
4 September 1909	Dundee	A	2–4	22,000	McPherson, Bennett
18 September 1909	Aberdeen	H	2–1	16,000	Gordon, Gilchrist
20 September 1909	Hibernian	A	0–1	10,000	
27 September 1909	Dundee	H	2–1	30,000	McPherson, Reid
2 October 1909	Port Glasgow	A	1–1	5,000	Hunter
16 October 1909	Hamilton Academical	H	5–1	9,000	Hunter (5)
23 October 1909	Kilmarnock	A	2–0	9,500	Hunter (2)
30 October 1909	Celtic	H	0–0	45,000	
6 November 1909	Partick Thistle	A	0–0	30,000	
13 November 1909	Clyde	A	0–1	18,000	
20 November 1909	Queen's Park	H	7–1	14,000	Hunter (3), Ramage, May, Gilchrist, McPherson
27 November 1909	Motherwell	H	4–1	7,000	Hunter (3), Gilchrist
4 December 1909	Greenock Morton	A	4–1	6,000	Bennett (2), McPherson, Ramage
11 December 1909	Third Lanark	A	1–2	6,000	Hunter
18 December 1909	Partick Thistle	H	2–1	16,000	Gilchrist, McPherson
25 December 1909	Falkirk	A	1–3	7,000	McPherson
1 January 1910	Celtic	A	1–1	47,000	Hogg
3 January 1910	Port Glasgow	H	4–0	8,000	Reid (2), McLean, McPherson
8 January 1910	Heart of Midlothian	H	1–0	8,000	McPherson
15 January 1910	Hamilton Academical	A	3–2	8,000	Hunter (3, 1 pen)
29 January 1910	Motherwell	A	3–2	8,000	Miller, McPherson, Hogg
19 February 1910	Greenock Morton	H	2–1	8,000	Hogg, Bennett
26 February 1910	St Mirren	A	6–1	8,000	Reid (3), Hogg (2), McPherson
5 March 1910	Aberdeen	A	1–1	8,000	Reid
12 March 1910	Queen's Park	A	2–3	16,000	Reid (2)
19 March 1910	Airdrieonians	H	3–0	5,000	Yuille (2), Bennett
26 March 1910	Hibernian	H	1–0	15,000	A.Smith
28 March 1910	Third Lanark	H	1–0	12,000	McPherson
18 April 1910	Heart of Midlothian	A	3–1	7,000	Reid (2), McPherson
23 April 1910	Clyde	H	1–0	10,000	Gordon
30 April 1910	Falkirk	H	0–1	15,000	
7 May 1910	Clyde	H	0–1	14,000	

=== Scottish Cup ===
Date	Round	Opponent	Venue	Result	Attendance	Scorers
22 January 1910	R1	Inverness Thistle	H	3–1	10,000	Gilchrist (3)
5 February 1910	R2	Clyde	A	0–2	35,000	

== Appearances ==
Player	Position	Appearances	Goals
(Scotland) Harry Rennie	GK	2	0
(England) Herbert Lock	GK	38	0
(Ireland) Alex Craig	DF	9	0
(Scotland) George Waddell	DF	12	0
(Scotland) Jock McKenzie	DF	29	0
(Scotland) John May	DF	26	2
(Scotland) Robert Campbell	DF	15	0
(Scotland) David Taylor	DF	1	0
(Scotland) Jimmy Gordon	DF	22	2
(Scotland) George Law	DF	27	0
(Scotland) James Stark	DF	29	0
(Scotland) James Galt	MF	31	0
(Scotland) Thomas Gilchrist	MF	17	5
(Scotland) Robert Ramage	MF	6	2
(Scotland) John Riley	MF	1	0
(Scotland) John Bell	MF	1	0
(Scotland) Joe Hendry	MF	2	0
(Scotland) Bill McPherson	FW	30	12
(Scotland) James Jackson	FW	1	0
(England) Billy Hogg	FW	30	8
(Scotland) Alec Bennett	FW	26	7
(Scotland) Alex Smith	FW	25	2
(Scotland) Willie Reid	FW	24	14
(Scotland) William Yuille	FW	6	2
(Scotland) Thomas Miller	FW	9	1
(Scotland) Willie Hunter	FW	20	19
(Scotland) James McLean	FW	1	1

== See also ==
- 1909–10 in Scottish football
- 1909–10 Scottish Cup
