= Jay Turnbull =

Scottish footballer

Personal information
- Full name: James Turnbull
- Date of birth: 1911
- Place of birth: Kelty, Scotland
- Date of death: 1992 (aged 81)
- Position: Inside left

Youth career
- Blairhill Juveniles

Senior career*
Years	Team	Apps	(Gls)
–1932	Kelty Rangers		
1930–1934	East Stirlingshire	102	(39)
1934	Rhyl Athletic		
1934	Workington		
1935	East Stirlingshire	9	(1)
1935	Cowdenbeath	16	(14)
1935–1945	Rangers	25	(7)
1945–1947	Cowdenbeath		
- * Club domestic league appearances and goals

James Turnbull (1911–1992) was a Scottish professional footballer who played as an inside left in the Scottish League for Cowdenbeath, Rangers and East Stirlingshire.

== Career ==
Turnbull played as an inside left in the Scottish League for Cowdenbeath, Rangers and East Stirlingshire. He also played non-League football in England and Wales. Turnbull won the Scottish Cup with Rangers in 1936 and played a small role (six appearances, one goal) in the club's Scottish League victory in 1938–39, before his career was interrupted by World War II.

== Career statistics ==
Appearances and goals by club, season and competition
Club	Season	League			National Cup		Other		Total	
Club	Season	Division	Apps	Goals	Apps	Goals	Apps	Goals	Apps	Goals
East Stirlingshire	1930–31	Scottish Division Two	30	14	1	0	—		31	14
East Stirlingshire	1931–32	Scottish Division Two	32	11	1	0	—		33	11
East Stirlingshire	1932–33	Scottish Division One	17	9	0	0	—		17	9
East Stirlingshire	1933–34	Scottish Division Two	23	5	2	0	—		25	5
East Stirlingshire	Total		102	39	4	0	—		106	39
East Stirlingshire	1934–35	Scottish Division Two	9	1	1	0	—		10	1
East Stirlingshire	Total		111	40	5	0	—		116	40
Cowdenbeath	1935–36	Scottish Division Two	16	14	—		—		16	4
Rangers	1935–36	Scottish Division One	16	5	6	1	0	0	22	6
Rangers	1937–38	Scottish Division One	3	1	0	0	1 (Note: Appearance in Glasgow Cup)	0	4	1
Rangers	1938–39	Scottish Division One	6	1	3	0	0	0	9	1
Rangers	Total		25	7	9	1	1	0	35	8
Career total			152	61	14	1	1	0	167	62

== Honours ==
East Stirlingshire

- Scottish League Division Two: 1931–32

Rangers

- Scottish Cup: 1935–36
- Glasgow Cup: 1937–38

Individual

- Cowdenbeath Hall of Fame
