= 1936–37 Rangers F.C. season =

Rangers
1936–37 season
- Chairman: James Bowie
- Manager: Bill Struth
- Ground: Ibrox Park
- Scottish League Division One: 1st P38 W26 D9 L3 F88 A32 Pts61
- Scottish Cup: First round
- Top goalscorer: League: Willie Thornton, Jimmy Duncanson (18); All: Willie Thornton, Jimmy Duncanson (25)

The 1936–37 season was the 63rd season of competitive football by Rangers.

== Overview ==
Rangers finished as champions of Scotland, one position higher than the previous season. However, Rangers were unable to retain the Scottish Cup.

== Results ==
All results are written with Rangers' score first.

=== Scottish League Division One ===
Date	Opponent	Venue	Result	Attendance	Scorers
8 August 1936	Dundee	A	0–0	22,000	
15 August 1936	Third Lanark	H	3–1	16,000	
19 August 1936	Dundee	H	3–0	12,000	
22 August 1936	Falkirk	A	2–0	22,000	
29 August 1936	Hibernian	H	4–0	12,000	
5 September 1936	Arbroath	A	0–0	8,500	
9 September 1936	Third Lanark	A	0–0	25,000	
12 September 1936	Motherwell	H	3–2	45,000	
19 September 1936	Celtic	A	1–1	60,000	
26 September 1936	Dunfermline Athletic	H	5–3	8,000	
3 October 1936	St Mirren	A	4–1	24,000	
17 October 1936	Queen's Park	A	1–1	30,000	
24 October 1936	Queen of the South	H	1–1	5,000	
7 November 1936	Aberdeen	H	2–1	57,000	
14 November 1936	Kilmarnock	A	2–1	14,000	
21 November 1936	St Johnstone	H	0–0	10,000	
28 November 1936	Albion Rovers	A	3–2	6,000	
5 December 1936	Heart of Midlothian	A	2–5	40,211	
12 December 1936	Clyde	H	2–0	10,000	
19 December 1936	Falkirk	H	3–0	8,000	
26 December 1936	Hibernian	A	4–1	22,000	
1 January 1937	Celtic	H	1–0	94,811	
2 January 1937	Partick Thistle	A	1–0	20,000	
4 January 1937	Heart of Midlothian	H	0–1	31,000	
9 January 1937	Arbroath	H	4–0	14,000	
16 January 1937	Motherwell	A	4–1	22,000	
23 January 1937	St Mirren	H	2–0	14,000	
6 February 1937	Dunfermline Athletic	A	3–2	8,000	
20 February 1937	Queen's Park	H	1–1	12,000	
27 February 1937	Kilmarnock	H	8–0	7,000	
6 March 1937	Queen of the South	A	1–0	10,500	
20 March 1937	Aberdeen	A	1–1	32,000	
24 March 1937	Hamilton Academical	H	4–0	6,000	
29 March 1937	Partick Thistle	H	3–1	18,000	
3 April 1937	St Johnstone	A	2–1	7,000	
7 April 1937	Hamilton Academical	A	5–1	5,000	
10 April 1937	Albion Rovers	H	1–0	5,000	
23 April 1937	Clyde	A	2–3	9,000	

=== Scottish Cup ===
Date	Round	Opponent	Venue	Result	Attendance	Scorers
30 January 1937	R1	Queen of the South	A	0–1	13,000	

== See also ==
- 1936–37 in Scottish football
- 1936–37 Scottish Cup
