= Robert Howe =

Robert Howe may refer to:

- Robert Howe (footballer) (1903–1979), Scottish international football (soccer) player
- Robert Howe (Continental Army officer) (1732–1786), Major-General in the Continental Army during the American Revolutionary War
- Robert Howe (tennis) (1925–2004), 1958 winner of the Wimbledon mixed doubles championship
- Robert Howe (Australian printer), son of George Howe
- Robert Howe (Australian politician) (1861–1915), member of the Australian House of Representatives
- Robert Howe (California politician) (1831–1915), California politician serving in the assembly and state senate
- Sir Robert George Howe (1893–1981), British diplomat
- Robert Howe, former CEO of Scient

== See also ==
- Bobby Howe (disambiguation)
- Robert Van Howe, American pediatrician and anti-circumcision activist
- Barry Robert Howe, American bishop
