= 1944–45 Rangers F.C. season =

Rangers
1944–45 season
- Chairman: James Bowie
- Manager: Bill Struth
- Ground: Ibrox Park
- Southern League: 1st P30 W23 D3 L4 F88? A27 Pts49
- Southern League Cup: Winners
- Top goalscorer: League: Willie Thornton, Jimmy Duncanson (18); All: Willie Thornton, Jimmy Duncanson (25)

The 1944–45 season was the 6th year of wartime football by Rangers.

== Results ==
All results are written with Rangers' score first.

=== Southern League ===
Date	Opponent	Venue	Result	Attendance	Scorers
12 August 1944	Falkirk	A	3–2		
19 August 1944	St Mirren	H	6–1		
2 September 1944	Third Lanark	H	0–0		
9 September 1944	Celtic	A	4–0		
16 September 1944	Airdrieonians	H	2–0		
23 September 1944	Hibernian	A	1–4		
30 September 1944	Motherwell	H	1–1		
14 October 1944	Hamilton Academical	A	4–2		
21 October 1944	Albion Rovers	H	3–1		
28 October 1944	Heart of Midlothian	A	1–1	20,000	
4 November 1944	Morton	H	2–4		
11 November 1944	Dumbarton	H	5–2		
18 November 1944	Queen's Park	A	4–1		
25 November 1944	Falkirk	H	4–0		
2 December 1944	St Mirren	A	1–0		
9 December 1944	Partick Thistle	H	2–0		
16 December 1944	Third Lanark	A	4–1		
23 December 1944	Hibernian	H	5–0		
30 December 1944	Airdrieonians	A	3–1		
1 January 1945	Celtic	H	0–1		
2 January 1945	Queen's Park	H	0–1		
6 January 1945	Motherwell	A	4–0		
13 January 1945	Clyde	A	2–0		
20 January 1945	Hamilton Academical	H	2–0		
27 January 1945	Albion Rovers	A	4–0		
3 February 1945	Heart of Midlothian	H	4–0	15,000	
10 February 1945	Morton	A	4–1		
17 February 1945	Dumbarton	A	6–3		
2 April 1945	Partick Thistle	A	4–1		
7 April 1945	Clyde	A	3–0		

=== Southern League Cup ===
Date	Round	Opponent	Venue	Result	Attendance	Scorers
24 February 1945	SR	Albion Rovers	H	2–1		
3 March 1945	SR	Hibernian	A	1–1		
10 March 1945	SR	Third Lanark	H	2–0		
17 March 1945	SR	Albion Rovers	A	3–1		
24 March 1945	SR	Hibernian	H	2–0		
31 March 1945	SR	Third Lanark	A	4–2		
21 April 1945	SF	Queen's Park	N	3–0	70,000	
12 May 1945	F	Motherwell	N	2–1		

== See also ==
- 1944–45 in Scottish football
- 1944–45 Southern League Cup (Scotland)
