= Archie Macaulay =

Scottish footballer and manager

Personal information
- Full name: Archibald Renwick Macaulay
- Date of birth: 30 July 1915
- Place of birth: Falkirk, Scotland
- Date of death: 10 June 1993 (aged 77)
- Place of death: Knowle, England
- Positions: Inside right; wing half

Senior career*
Years	Team	Apps	(Gls)
1931–1932	Comely Park		
1932–1933	Lauriston Villa		
1933	Camelon Juniors		
1933–1937	Rangers	36	(7)
1937–1946	West Ham United	83	(29)
1946–1947	Brentford	26	(2)
1947–1950	Arsenal	103	(1)
1950–1953	Fulham	48	(4)
1953–1955	Guildford City	60	(9)

International career
1947–1948	Scotland	7	(0)

Managerial career
- 1953–1955: Guildford City
- 1957–1961: Norwich City
- 1961–1963: West Bromwich Albion
- 1963–1968: Brighton & Hove Albion
- * Club domestic league appearances and goals

Archibald Renwick Macaulay (30 July 1915 – 10 June 1993) was a Scottish football player and manager.

== Playing career ==
Born in Falkirk, Macaulay started his playing career in junior football and joined Rangers in 1933, where he became a regular at the age of only 18. Playing as an inside right, he won a Scottish Cup medal in 1935–36 and a Scottish League Championship medal the year after. In 1937 he was transferred to West Ham United for £6,000; the Second World War interrupted his career somewhat but he still won a Wartime Cup medal in 1940 and played five unofficial wartime matches for Scotland.

Macaulay was signed by Brentford in October 1946, and made his official Scotland debut against England at Wembley Stadium on 12 April 1947. By this time he had been converted to a wing half, Brentford were relegated to the Second Division at the end of the 1946–47 season. Macaulay was selected to play for Great Britain in a one-off match in May 1947.

He was signed by Arsenal in July 1947 for £10,000. Macaulay made his Arsenal debut against Sunderland on 23 August 1947 and in his first season with the Gunners, he played 40 league matches and won a First Division Championship medal. He continued to play for Arsenal as a near ever-present figure for the next two seasons, although he missed out on Arsenal's 1950 FA Cup triumph after manager Tom Whittaker preferred fellow Scot Alex Forbes in the final. Macaulay left Arsenal for Fulham in June 1950; in all he made 108 appearances in three seasons, scoring one goal. He also won six more caps for Scotland while at Arsenal, bringing his total tally to seven. He spent three seasons at Fulham, though he could not save them from relegation to Division Two in 1951–52. He moved to Guildford City after that, to become the club's player-manager.

== Managerial career ==
In 1957 he succeeded Tom Parker as manager of Norwich City, where he led the Third Division side to the FA Cup semi-finals in 1959 in one of the most famous FA Cup runs of all time, and promotion to the Second Division the following year. In 1961 he moved on to West Bromwich Albion, though the Baggies did little under his two-year reign, instead enjoying mid-table obscurity.

Macaulay finished his managerial career at Brighton & Hove Albion between 1963 and 1968, leading the club to promotion from the Fourth Division in 1965. After that, he left football management completely, and later worked as a traffic warden. He died in June 1993, aged 77.

== Honours ==
=== Player ===
Rangers

- Scottish League First Division: 1936–37
- Scottish Cup: 1935–36

Arsenal

- Football League First Division: 1947–48
- FA Charity Shield: 1948

=== Managerial ===
Brighton Hove & Albion

- Football League Fourth Division: 1963–64
