= 1938–39 Rangers F.C. season =

Rangers
1938–39 season
- Chairman: James Bowie
- Manager: Bill Struth
- Ground: Ibrox Park
- Scottish League Division One: 1st P38 W25 D9 L4 F112 A55 Pts59
- Scottish Cup: Third round
- Top goalscorer: League: Willie Thornton, Jimmy Duncanson (18); All: Willie Thornton, Jimmy Duncanson (25)

The 1938–39 season was the 65th season of competitive football by Rangers.

== Results ==
All results are written with Rangers' score first.

=== Scottish League Division One ===
Date	Opponent	Venue	Result	Attendance	Scorers
13 August 1938	St Johnstone	A	3–3	15,000	
20 August 1938	Motherwell	H	2–2	25,000	
24 August 1938	St Johnstone	H	4–2	18,000	
27 August 1938	St Mirren	A	5–1		
3 September 1938	Ayr United	H	4–1	15,000	
10 September 1938	Celtic	A	2–6	74,500	
14 September 1938	Motherwell	A	5–1	16,000	
17 September 1938	Third Lanark	H	5–1	20,000	
24 September 1938	Arbroath	A	3–3	8,000	
1 October 1938	Hibernian	H	5–2	15,000	
8 October 1938	Falkirk	A	2–2	14,000	
15 October 1938	Partick Thistle	H	4–1	15,000	
22 October 1938	Kilmarnock	A	1–3	18,000	
29 October 1938	Raith Rovers	H	4–0	12,000	
5 November 1938	Albion Rovers	A	7–2	10,000	
12 November 1938	Heart of Midlothian	A	3–1	38,592	
19 November 1938	Clyde	H	2–0	14,000	
26 November 1938	Queen's Park	A	3–2	38,344	
3 December 1938	Queen of the South	H	4–1	16,000	
10 December 1938	Hamilton Academical	A	1–2	17,500	
17 December 1938	Aberdeen	A	5–2	30,000	
26 December 1938	St Mirren	H	3–0	18,000	
31 December 1938	Ayr United	A	4–3	17,000	
2 January 1939	Celtic	H	2–1	118,567	
3 January 1939	Partick Thistle	A	4–2	35,000	
11 January 1939	Arbroath	H	4–0	25,602	
14 January 1939	Hibernian	A	1–1	31,000	
28 January 1939	Falkirk	H	2–1	15,000	
11 February 1939	Third Lanark	A	2–1	18,000	
25 February 1939	Kilmarnock	H	2–2	10,000	
4 March 1939	Raith Rovers	A	2–0	18,000	
11 March 1939	Albion Rovers	H	5–0	10,000	
18 March 1939	Heart of Midlothian	H	1–1	40,000	
28 March 1939	Clyde	A	1–1	8,000	
1 April 1939	Queen's Park	H	1–0	20,000	
8 April 1939	Queen of the South	A	1–1	9,000	
21 April 1939	Hamilton Academical	H	3–2	7,000	
29 April 1939	Aberdeen	A	0–2	15,002	

=== Scottish Cup ===
Date	Round	Opponent	Venue	Result	Attendance	Scorers
21 January 1939	R1	Raith Rovers	A	1–0	21,747	
4 February 1939	R2	Hamilton Academical	H	2–0	75,000	
18 February 1939	R3	Clyde	H	1–4	63,000	

== See also ==
- 1938–39 in Scottish football
- 1938–39 Scottish Cup
