= 1908–09 Rangers F.C. season =

Rangers
1908–09 season
- Chairman: James Henderson
- Manager: William Wilton
- Ground: Ibrox Park
- Scottish League Division One: 4th P34 W19 D7 L8 F91 A38 Pts45
- Scottish Cup: Runners-up
- Top goalscorer: League: Robert Campbell (16); All: Robert Campbell (17)

The 1908–09 season was the 35th season of competitive football by Rangers.

== Overview ==
Rangers played a total of 41 competitive matches during the 1908–09 season. The team finished fourth in the league, six points behind champions Celtic, after only winning 19 of there 34 matches.

The Scottish Cup campaign was thrown out against the league champions after a 2–2 draw at Hampden Park. The final was replayed a week later at the national stadium and finished 1–1, the competition was abandoned and trophy withheld following a riot after the replay.

== Results ==
All results are written with Rangers' score first.

=== Scottish League Division One ===
Date	Opponent	Venue	Result	Attendance	Scorers
15 August 1908	Port Glasgow	H	7–0	15,000	McDonald (3), McPherson (2), Murray, Bennett
22 August 1908	Partick Thistle	A	2–0	12,000	McPherson, Murray
29 August 1908	Falkirk	H	4–1	30,000	A.Smith (2), Bennett, McDonald
5 September 1908	Aberdeen	A	2–0	9,000	Campbell, Bennett
12 September 1908	Kilmarnock	A	5–0	14,000	Murray (2), A.Smith, Bennett, McPherson
19 September 1908	St Mirren	H	1–1	27,000	Campbell
28 September 1908	Dundee	H	2–0	35,000	Bennett, Campbell
10 October 1908	Airdrieonians	A	3–4	11,000	Gordon, Campbell, McPherson
17 October 1908	Motherwell	H	3–1	11,000	Livingstone, A.Smith, J.Smith
24 October 1908	Airdrieonians	H	2–0	18,000	J.Smith (2)
31 October 1908	Third Lanark	H	2–2	8,000	J.Smith, Livingstone
7 November 1908	Greenock Morton	H	8–0	10,000	Murray (3), Bennett (2), McPherson (2), A.Smith
14 November 1908	Queen's Park	A	1–1	32,000	Murray
21 November 1908	Clyde	A	1–0	18,000	Bennett
28 November 1908	Heart of Midlothian	H	4–3	10,000	Campbell (2), May, Bennett
5 December 1908	Falkirk	A	0–1	10,000	
12 December 1908	Hamilton Academical	A	7–0	8,000	Campbell (4), A.Smith, Yuille, Gordon
19 December 1908	Kilmarnock	H	1–1	8,000	May
26 December 1908	St Mirren	A	3–1	12,000	Bennett, McPherson, Murray
1 January 1909	Celtic	H	1–3	60,000	Murray
2 January 1909	Partick Thistle	H	6–0	5,000	Livingstone (4), A.Smith, J.Smith
9 January 1909	Dundee	A	0–4	16,000	
30 January 1909	Motherwell	A	5–2	7,000	McPherson (2), A.Smith, Bennett, Campbell
27 February 1909	Port Glasgow	A	0–2	4,000	
6 March 1909	Hibernian	H	0–0	4,000	
13 March 1909	Celtic	A	3–2	28,000	Yuille, McDonald, Murray
27 March 1909	Aberdeen	H	3–1	10,000	Bennett, Campbell, Gilchrist
30 March 1909	Hamilton Academical	H	4–0		Gordon (3), Campbell
3 April 1909	Heart of Midlothian	A	0–0	11,500	
12 April 1909	Clyde	H	2–2	15,000	Gilchrist, McPherson
19 April 1909	Hibernian	A	0–1	6,000	
24 April 1909	Third Lanark	A	0–1	11,000	
26 April 1909	Queen's Park	H	2–3	1,000	Bennett, McPherson
28 April 1909	Greenock Morton	A	7–1	2,000	Campbell (3), A.Smith, Gordon, Stark, McDonald

=== Scottish Cup ===
Date	Round	Opponent	Venue	Result	Attendance	Scorers
23 January 1909	R1	St Johnstone	A	3–0	7,000	Stark, Bennett, Campbell
6 February 1909	R2	Dundee	A	0–0	31,000	
13 February 1909	R2	Dundee	H	1–0	54,000	McPherson
20 February 1909	QF	Queen's Park	H	1–0	45,000	McPherson
20 March 1909	SF	Falkirk	A	1–0	12,000	McPherson
10 April 1909	F	Celtic	N	2–2	70,000	Gilchrist, Bennett
17 April 1909	F	Celtic	N	1–1	60,000	Gordon

== Appearances ==
Player	Position	Appearances	Goals
(Scotland) Harry Rennie	GK	38	0
(Scotland) John McArthur	GK	3	0
(Ireland) Alex Craig	DF	35	0
(Scotland) John May	DF	26	2
(Scotland) Jimmy Gordon	DF	27	7
(Scotland) George Law	DF	27	0
(Scotland) David Taylor	DF	6	0
(Scotland) James Stark	DF	24	2
(Scotland) Jimmy Sharp	DF	18	0
(Scotland) Jimmy Jackson	DF	1	0
(Scotland) James Galt	MF	31	0
(Scotland) Thomas Gilchrist	MF	13	3
(Scotland) Robert Noble	MF	2	0
(Scotland) Alex Bennett	MF	35	15
(Scotland) John Macdonald	MF	24	6
(Scotland) George Livingstone	MF	13	6
(Scotland) Alec Smith	FW	35	9
(Scotland) Robert Campbell	FW	27	17
(Scotland) Tom Murray	FW	15	11
(Scotland) William McPherson	FW	33	15
(Scotland) Willie Reid	FW	2	1
(Scotland) John Smith	FW	7	5
(Scotland) William Yuille	FW	3	2
(Scotland) George Waddell	DF	1	0
(Scotland) Thomas Miller	FW	1	0
(Scotland) James McLean	FW	1	0
(Scotland) Jock McKenzie	DF	3	0

- Source: Fitbastats

== See also ==
- 1908–09 in Scottish football
- 1908–09 Scottish Cup
- Edinburgh Exhibition Cup
