= 1944–45 Celtic F.C. season =

Celtic
1944–45 season
- Manager: Jimmy McStay
- Stadium: Celtic Park
- Southern League: 2nd
- Summer Cup: Semi-final
- Southern League Cup: Group stage

During the 1944–45 Scottish football season, Celtic competed in the Southern Football League.

== Competitions ==
=== Southern Football League ===
==== League table ====
Pos	Team	Pld	W	D	L	GF	GA	GD	Pts
1	Rangers (C)	30	23	3	4	88	27	+61	49
2	Celtic	30	20	2	8	70	42	+28	42
3	Motherwell	30	18	5	7	83	54	+29	41
4	Clyde	30	18	0	12	80	61	+19	36
5	Heart of Midlothian	30	14	7	9	75	60	+15	35

Source: The Celtic Wiki – Southern Football League
Rules for classification: 1) points; 2) goal difference; 3) number of goals scored.
(C) Champions

==== Matches ====
12 August 1944 Southern League	Celtic	4–1	Hearts	Glasgow
				Stadium: Celtic Park

19 August 1944 Southern League	Albion Rovers	0–1	Celtic	Coatbridge
				Stadium: Cliftonhill

26 August 1944 Southern League	Celtic	1–0	Third Lanark	Glasgow
				Stadium: Celtic Park

2 September 1944 Southern League	Hamilton Academical	6–2	Celtic	Hamilton
				Stadium: Douglas Park

9 September 1944 Southern League	Celtic	0–4	Rangers	Glasgow
				Stadium: Celtic Park

16 September 1944 Southern League	Dumbarton	0–3	Celtic	Dumbarton
				Stadium: Boghead Park

23 September 1944 Southern League	Celtic	2–4	Clyde	Glasgow
				Stadium: Celtic Park

30 September 1944 Southern League	Morton	4–3	Celtic	Greenock
				Stadium: Cappielow Park

14 October 1944 Southern League	Celtic	1–1	Hibernian	Glasgow
				Stadium: Celtic Park

21 October 1944 Southern League	St Mirren	2–1	Celtic	Paisley
				Stadium: St Mirren Park, Love Street

28 October 1944 Southern League	Celtic	4–2	Airdrieonians	Glasgow
				Stadium: Celtic Park

4 November 1944 Southern League	Motherwell	2–1	Celtic	Motherwell
				Stadium: Fir Park

11 November 1944 Southern League	Falkirk	2–1	Celtic	Falkirk
				Stadium: Brockville Park

18 November 1944 Southern League	Third Lanark	1–2	Celtic	Glasgow
				Stadium: Cathkin Park

25 November 1944 Southern League	Hearts	2–0	Celtic	Edinburgh
				Stadium: Tynecastle Park; Attendance: 12,000

2 December 1944 Southern League	Celtic	5–0	Albion Rovers	Glasgow
				Stadium: Celtic Park

9 December 1944 Southern League	Queen's Park	0–2	Celtic	Glasgow
				Stadium: Hampden Park

16 December 1944 Southern League	Celtic	5–3	Hamilton Academical	Glasgow
				Stadium: Celtic Park

23 December 1944 Southern League	Clyde	0–3	Celtic	Glasgow
				Stadium: Shawfield Stadium

30 December 1944 Southern League	Celtic	2–1	Dumbarton	Glasgow
				Stadium: Celtic Park

1 January 1945 Southern League	Rangers	0–1	Celtic	Glasgow
				Stadium: Ibrox Park

6 January 1945 Southern League	Celtic	6–1	Morton	Glasgow
				Stadium: Celtic Park

13 January 1945 Southern League	Partick Thistle	0–3	Celtic	Glasgow
				Stadium: Firhill Park

20 January 1945 Southern League	Hibernian	2–4	Celtic	Edinburgh
				Stadium: Easter Road

27 January 1945 Southern League	Celtic	2–1	St Mirren	Glasgow
				Stadium: Celtic Park

3 February 1945 Southern League	Airdrieonians	1–2	Celtic	Airdrie
				Stadium: Broomfield Park

10 February 1945 Southern League	Celtic	1–1	Motherwell	Glasgow
				Stadium: Celtic Park

17 February 1945 Southern League	Celtic	2–1	Falkirk	Glasgow
				Stadium: Celtic Park

2 April 1945 Southern League	Celtic	3–0	Queen's Park	Glasgow
				Stadium: Celtic Park

7 April 1945 Southern League	Celtic	3–0	Partick Thistle	Glasgow
				Stadium: Celtic Park

=== Summer Cup ===
26 May 1945 First round first leg	Albion Rovers	1–1	Celtic	Coatbridge
				Stadium: Cliftonhill

2 June 1945 First round second leg	Celtic	4–2	Albion Rovers	Glasgow
				Stadium: Celtic Park

23 June 1945 Semi-final	Celtic	0–2	Hibernian	Glasgow
				Stadium: Tynecastle Park

=== Southern League Cup ===
24 February 1945 Group	Clyde	0–0	Celtic	Glasgow
				Stadium: Shawfield Stadium

3 March 1945 Group	Celtic	3–2	Falkirk	Glasgow
				Stadium: Celtic Park

10 March 1946 Group	Partick Thistle	0–1	Celtic	Glasgow
				Stadium: Firhill Park

17 March 1945 Group	Celtic	1–1	Clyde	Glasgow
				Stadium: Celtic Park

24 March 1945 Group	Falkirk	1–0	Celtic	Falkirk
				Stadium: Brockville Park

31 March 1945 Group	Celtic	1–2	Partick Thistle	Glasgow
				Stadium: Celtic Park
