= 1937–38 Rangers F.C. season =

Rangers
1937–38 season
- Chairman: James Bowie
- Manager: Bill Struth
- Ground: Ibrox Park
- Scottish League Division One: 3rd P38 W18 D13 L7 F75 A49 Pts49
- Scottish Cup: Semi-finals
- Top goalscorer: League: Willie Thornton, Jimmy Duncanson (18); All: Willie Thornton, Jimmy Duncanson (25)

The 1937–38 season was the 64th season of competitive football by Rangers.

== Results ==
All results are written with Rangers' score first.

=== Scottish League Division One ===
Date	Opponent	Venue	Result	Attendance	Scorers
14 August 1937	Falkirk	H	0–0	20,000	
18 August 1937	Motherwell	H	2–1	22,000	
21 August 1938	Hibernian	A	0–0	31,000	
25 August 1937	Falkirk	A	1–0	22,618	
28 August 1937	St Johnstone	H	2–2	20,000	
4 September 1937	Motherwell	A	1–1	25,000	
11 September 1937	Celtic	H	3–1	80,000	
15 September 1937	Hibernian	H	2–0	12,000	
18 September 1937	Ayr United	A	1–1	16,000	
25 September 1937	St Mirren	H	4–0	12,000	
2 October 1937	Third Lanark	A	2–1	19,000	
9 October 1937	Dundee	H	6–0	30,000	
23 October 1937	Hamilton Academical	H	2–2	12,000	
6 November 1937	Kilmarnock	H	4–1	12,000	
13 November 1937	Arbroath	A	1–1	8,500	
20 November 1937	Morton	H	3–1	8,000	
27 November 1937	Heart of Midlothian	H	0–3	51,000	
4 December 1937	Clyde	A	1–1	20,000	
11 December 1937	Queen's Park	H	2–1	15,000	
25 December 1937	St Johnstone	A	5–1	8,000	
1 January 1938	Celtic	A	0–3	83,000	
3 January 1938	Partick Thistle	H	1–3	20,000	
8 January 1938	Ayr United	H	2–2	20,000	
15 January 1938	St Mirren	A	1–1	20,000	
29 January 1938	Third Lanark	H	3–0	12,000	
5 February 1938	Dundee	A	1–6	15,000	
19 February 1938	Hamilton Academical	A	2–2	10,000	
26 February 1938	Aberdeen	H	2–2	35,000	
5 March 1938	Queen of the South	A	2–0	11,000	
12 March 1938	Kilmarnock	A	1–2	10,000	
23 March 1938	Arbroath	H	3–1	10,000	
26 March 1938	Morton	A	3–2	6,000	
9 April 1938	Clyde	H	1–0	7,000	
13 April 1938	Aberdeen	A	3–0	18,000	
16 April 1938	Queen's Park	A	3–0	19,083	
18 April 1938	Partick Thistle	A	1–1	10,000	
23 April 1938	Heart of Midlothian	A	2–3	28,204	
30 April 1938	Queen of the South	H	2–3	12,000	

=== Scottish Cup ===
Date	Round	Opponent	Venue	Result	Attendance	Scorers
22 January 1938	R1	Alloa Athletic	A	6–1	9,400	
12 February 1938	R2	Queen of the South	H	3–1	50,000	
19 March 1938	R3	Falkirk	A	2–1	20,056	
2 April 1938	SF	Kilmarnock	N	3–4	70,833	

== See also ==
- 1937–38 in Scottish football
- 1937–38 Scottish Cup
