= Bobby Howe =

Bobby Howe may refer to:

- Bobby Howe (footballer, born 1945), English footballer, player of West Ham United, and coach of the Portland Timbers (2001–2005)
- Bobby Howe (footballer, born 1973), English footballer, player of Nottingham Forest, Ipswich Town, Swindon Town, Havant & Waterlooville, and Farnborough Town
- Bobby Howe (Scottish footballer) (1903–1979), Scotland international

== See also ==
- Robert Howe (disambiguation)
