= James Turnbull =

James Turnbull may refer to:

- James Turnbull (politician), Scottish-born lawyer and political figure in Nova Scotia
- James Turnbull (steamboat captain), steamboat captain on the Colorado River
- James Youll Turnbull, Scottish recipient of the Victoria Cross
- Jimmy Turnbull, Scottish footballer
- Jay Turnbull, Scottish footballer
- Jim Turnbull (1932–2020), Scottish wrestler

== See also ==
- James Turnbull Thomson, publican and brewer, founder of Balhannah, South Australia
