= Mansley =

Mansley is an English surname that may refer to:

== People ==
- Allan Mansley (1946–2001), English soccer player
- Chad Mansley (born 1980), Australian soccer player
- Cliff Mansley (1921–2006), English soccer player
- David Zen Mansley, American voice actor

== Fictional characters ==
- Kent Mansley, main antagonist from the 1999 animated film The Iron Giant
