= Jock Mackenzie =

Scottish footballer

Personal information
- Full name: John Mackenzie
- Date of birth: 1 January 1882
- Place of birth: Boat of Garten, Scotland
- Position: Left back

Senior career*
Years	Team	Apps	(Gls)
- Elgin City
–1909	Forres Mechanics		
1909–1910	Rangers	26	(0)
1910–1916	Cowdenbeath	104	(4)
1920–1921	Clackmannan		
- * Club domestic league appearances and goals

John Mackenzie was a Scottish footballer who played as a left back in the Scottish League for Cowdenbeath and Rangers.

== Personal life ==
Mackenzie worked as a butcher and later served in the Black Watch during the First World War.

== Career statistics ==
Appearances and goals by club, season and competition
Club	Season	League			National Cup		Total	
Club	Season	Division	Apps	Goals	Apps	Goals	Apps	Goals
Rangers	1908–09	Scottish First Division	2	0	0	0	2	0
Rangers	1909–10	Scottish First Division	24	0	2	0	26	0
Rangers	Total		26	0	2	0	28	0
Cowdenbeath	1910–11	Scottish Second Division	22	0	6	0	28	0
Cowdenbeath	1911–12	Scottish Second Division	19	1	11	0	30	1
Cowdenbeath	1912–13	Scottish Second Division	18	0	0	0	18	0
Cowdenbeath	1913–14	Scottish Second Division	19	0	6	0	25	0
Cowdenbeath	1914–15	Scottish Second Division	26	3	—		26	3
Cowdenbeath	Total		104	4	23	0	127	4
Career total			130	4	25	0	155	4

== Honours ==
Cowdenbeath

- Scottish League Second Division: 1913–14, 1914–15

Individual

- Cowdenbeath Hall of Fame
