= William Cheyne (footballer) =

Scottish footballer

Personal information
- Full name: William Andrew Cheyne
- Date of birth: 1912
- Place of birth: St Combs, Scotland
- Date of death: 1988 (aged 75–76)
- Place of death: Glasgow, Scotland
- Position: Left back

Youth career
- St Combs

Senior career*
Years	Team	Apps	(Gls)
–	Fraserburgh		
1933–1939	Rangers	56	(1)
1939–1942	Motherwell	0	(0)
1942–1945	Dumbarton (wartime)		

International career
1936	Scottish League XI	1	(0)
- * Club domestic league appearances and goals

William Andrew Cheyne (1912–1988), sometimes known as Andy Cheyne, was a Scottish footballer who played as a left back.

A native of the village of St Combs in Aberdeenshire, he played for Fraserburgh in the Highland Football League before being signed by reigning Scottish champions Rangers in 1933. His role was mainly as a back-up, first to Whitey McDonald, then also remaining in reserve in 1937–38 when an unsuccessful experiment was made to install Alex Winning in the position, resulting in the signing of Jock Shaw who became a mainstay of the team. Cheyne took part sufficient matches (17) in 1936–37 to be awarded a Scottish Football League winner's medal (in the club's three other title wins during his time at Ibrox he made only three, six and two appearances respectively) and played in the 1936 Scottish Cup Final in which the Gers defeated Third Lanark to lift the trophy, having played no part in their winning runs in the two previous campaigns. During that fairly brief time when he was a first-choice at Rangers, Cheyne was selected once for the Scottish Football League XI in September 1936 and twice for the Glasgow FA's annual challenge match against Sheffield (November 1936, September 1937).

In May 1939 Cheyne moved on to Motherwell, but the outbreak of World War II shortly thereafter meant he never played officially for the club in the three years he was contracted there. He had made guest appearances for Dumbarton during that time, and signed formally for the Sons in 1942, playing regularly until 1945 – but again these were unofficial wartime tournaments, and he retired before normal competitions resumed.
