= Willie Hunter (footballer, born 1880) =

Scottish footballer

Personal information
- Full name: William Hunter
- Date of birth: 29 July 1880
- Place of birth: Springside, Scotland
- Position: Centre forward

Senior career*
Years	Team	Apps	(Gls)
1904–1905	St Bernard's	16	(3)
1905–1909	Airdrieonians	94	(52)
1908	→ Kilmarnock (loan)	4	(4)
1909–1913	Rangers	17	(19)
1911	→ Hamilton Academical (loan)	5	(0)
1911–1912	→ Airdrieonians (loan)	17	(6)
1912–1913	→ Motherwell (loan)	12	(3)
1913	Lochgelly United		
1913–1914	Cowdenbeath	17	(1)
1914–1915	Motherwell	1	(0)
–	Saltcoats Victoria		
Total		183	(88)

International career
1909	Scottish League XI	1	(0)
- * Club domestic league appearances and goals

William Hunter (born 29 July 1880) was a Scottish footballer who played mainly as a centre forward, featuring for clubs including St Bernard's, Airdrieonians, Kilmarnock, Rangers, Hamilton Academical, Motherwell and Cowdenbeath.

He came to prominence with Airdrie, scoring 43 Scottish Football League goals from 51 appearances between 1907 and 1909 (plus four in as many games on loan at Kilmarnock) which earned him a move to Rangers.

His scoring run continued at Ibrox with 19 goals in 17 matches in 1909–10 despite often being deployed on the wing, but by their high standards the club had a very poor season (fifth in the league, out of the Scottish Cup in the opening round, an Old Firm defeat in the Glasgow Cup final and not even making the final of the Charity Cup) and Hunter was not selected again, although he remained on the books until 1913, instead serving several loans. One of these was a short term deal with Hamilton with the intention of improving their team for the 1911 Scottish Cup Final, but he failed to score in any of his seven appearances and Accies lost the final to Celtic after a replay.

After leaving Rangers, now well into his 30s, Hunter had spells with Cowdenbeath, where he won the 1913–14 Scottish Division Two title, and Motherwell. Outside football, he trained as a school teacher.

Hunter was selected once for the Scottish Football League XI against the Irish League XI in 1909, while in good form with Airdrieonians.
