= George Hay (footballer) =

Scottish footballer

Personal information
- Date of birth: c. 1910
- Place of birth: Edinburgh, Scotland
- Position: Centre forward

Senior career*
Years	Team	Apps	(Gls)
1931–1934	Newtongrange Star		
1934	→ East Fife (trial)	1	(1)
1934–1937	Third Lanark	102	(86)
1937–1941	Queen of the South	65	(27)
Total		168	(114)
- * Club domestic league appearances and goals

George Hay was a Scottish footballer who played as a centre forward.

Hay joined Third Lanark in 1934 from Junior team Newtongrange Star where he won the Edinburgh & District League in 1932–33, scoring 36 times in all competitions. In his first full campaign at senior level he set the Thirds club record for goals in a season with 47 overall (two in the Scottish Cup, 45 in Scottish Division Two) in 1934–35, helping the Glasgow club win the lower tier title and regain top flight status at the first time of asking. The following season he represented the Glasgow FA in their annual challenge match against Sheffield, and scored six times in Third Lanark's run to the 1936 Scottish Cup Final, but drew a blank on the day as his side went down 1–0 to Rangers at Hampden Park.

He moved on from Cathkin Park in 1937 to sign for Queen of the South where he played for two seasons, missing only two matches in 1938–39 as the Doonhamers finished 6th in Division One. He remained contracted to the Dumfries club after World War II broke out and effectively ended his professional career; during the conflict he made guest appearances for St Bernard's and Heart of Midlothian.
