= James S. Blair =

Scottish footballer (c.1910–??)

Jimmy Blair
Personal information
- Full name: James S. Blair
- Date of birth: c. 1910
- Place of birth: Scotland
- Position: Right half

Senior career*
Years	Team	Apps	(Gls)
–	Royal Albert Athletic		
1930–1944	Third Lanark	251	(9)
1944–1946	St Mirren	0	(0)

International career
1939	Scottish League XI	2	(0)

Managerial career
- 1954–1955: Third Lanark
- * Club domestic league appearances and goals

James S. Blair (born c. 1910) was a Scottish footballer who played as a right half for Third Lanark in the first and second tiers of the Scottish Football League during the 1930s.

He won the Scottish Division Two title on two occasions (1930–31 and 1934–35) and played in the 1936 Scottish Cup Final which Thirds lost 1–0 to Rangers. A short time prior to the outbreak of World War II, Blair was selected to play for the Scottish Football League XI in two matches. In 1944 he joined St Mirren, but only appeared for the club in unofficial wartime competitions before retiring in 1946. He later managed Third Lanark between 1954 and 1955, without much success.
