= Thomas Miller (Rangers footballer) =

Scottish footballer

Personal information
- Place of birth: Scotland
- Position: Forward

Senior career*
Years	Team	Apps	(Gls)
1904–1906	Queen's Park	34	(5)
1906	Rangers	1	(0)
1906–1907	Arthurlie	19	(4)
1907–1910	Queen's Park	0	(0)
1909	→ Rangers (loan)	1	(0)
1909–1910	→ Rangers (loan)	9	(1)
- * Club domestic league appearances and goals

Thomas N. Miller was a Scottish amateur footballer who played in the Scottish League for Queen's Park, Rangers and Arthurlie as a forward.

== Personal life ==
Miller served as a private in the Royal Air Force during the First World War.

== Career statistics ==
Appearances and goals by club, season and competition
Club	Season	League			Scottish Cup		Other		Total	
Club	Season	Division	Apps	Goals	Apps	Goals	Apps	Goals	Apps	Goals
Queen's Park	1904–05	Scottish First Division	23	3	1	0	1 (Note: Appearance in Glasgow Merchants Charity Cup)	0	25	3
Queen's Park	1905–06	Scottish First Division	11	2	0	0	1 (Note: Appearance in Glasgow Cup)	0	12	2
Queen's Park	Total		34	5	1	0	2	0	37	5
Rangers	1905–06	Scottish First Division	1	0	—		0	0	1	0
Arthurlie	1906–07	Scottish Second Division	18	4	5	1	—		23	5
Arthurlie	1907–08	Scottish Second Division	1	0	0	0	—		1	0
Arthurlie	Total		19	4	5	1	—		24	5
Rangers (loan)	1908–09	Scottish First Division	1	0	0	0	0	0	1	0
Rangers (loan)	1909–10	Scottish First Division	9	1	0	0	0	0	9	1
Rangers (loan)	Rangers total		11	1	0	0	0	0	11	1
Career total			64	10	6	1	2	0	72	11
