= Jimmy McInnes =

Scottish footballer

Personal information
- Full name: James Sloan McInnes
- Date of birth: 17 February 1912
- Place of birth: Kilwinning, Scotland
- Date of death: 5 May 1965 (aged 53)
- Place of death: Liverpool, England
- Position: Left half

Senior career*
Years	Team	Apps	(Gls)
–	Ardeer Recreation		
1935–1938	Third Lanark	103	(7)
1938–1946	Liverpool	45	(1)
Total		148	(8)
- * Club domestic league appearances and goals

James Sloan McInnes (17 February 1912 – 5 May 1965) was a Scottish footballer who played as a wing half for Liverpool in the English Football League.

Born in Ayrshire, McInnes started his senior career at Third Lanark, winning the 1934–35 Scottish Division Two title and playing on the losing side in the 1936 Scottish Cup Final before he moved to England to play for Liverpool in March 1938. He made 11 appearances at the end of the 1937–38 season, appeared 34 times the following season, and played three times in the 1939–40 season which was suspended following the outbreak of the Second World War. He never played an official competitive match for the club again and retired in 1946 joining the club's administrative staff.

McInnes killed himself at Liverpool's home ground, Anfield, in 1965. He had become overwhelmed at the size of the job that he faced as the club grew in stature, and hanged himself from a beam at the rear of the Spion Kop.
