= Robert Van Howe =

American pediatrician and circumcision researcher

Robert Storms Van Howe is an American pediatrician and circumcision researcher from Marquette, Michigan. He was a professor of pediatrics at Central Michigan University College of Medicine at its founding, where he was the Chief of Pediatrics until 2017. He holds a master's degree in biostatistics, and previously taught pediatrics at Michigan State University.

== Research ==
Van Howe's research includes a study published in 2007 in BJU International. The study reported that the five most sensitive points on the human penis were all in areas of it that are removed by circumcision and that uncircumcised men's penises were four times more sensitive, on average, than were those of circumcised men. Critics of this study have noted that it was funded by the National Organization of Circumcision Information Resource Centers (NOCIRC), an anti-circumcision activist group. Van Howe maintains that this funding did not bias his study, telling ABC News, "The study was based on an objective finding" and "There's no way you can change what a person felt or didn't feel."

Van Howe authored a study which stated that meatal stenosis is much more common in circumcised boys than in uncircumcised ones. In the abstract of this study, Van Howe even states that "Meatal stenosis may be the most common complication following neonatal circumcision."

== Views on circumcision ==
Van Howe has said that "Circumcision is as harmful as it is unnecessary".
