= Kenny Dawson =

Scottish footballer (born 1915)

Personal information
- Full name: Kenneth Dawson
- Date of birth: 27 August 1915
- Place of birth: Forres, Scotland
- Date of death: 1987 (aged 71 or 72)
- Place of death: Cheshire, England
- Height: 5 ft 11 in (1.80 m)
- Position: Inside left

Youth career
- Forres Thistle

Senior career*
Years	Team	Apps	(Gls)
1933-1934	Nairn County	19	(19)
1934	Sheffield United	0	(0)
1934-1935	Forres Mechanics		
1935-1938	Falkirk	109	(89)
1938	Blackpool	12	(1)
1938-1944	Falkirk	23	(14)
1944-1946	Third Lanark		
1947-1950	Falkirk	72	(26)
- * Club domestic league appearances and goals

Kenneth Dawson (born 27 August 1915) was a Scottish professional footballer. An inside left, he played in the Football League for Blackpool, but was also on the books of Sheffield United and Falkirk. Dawson died in Cheshire in 1987.
