= 1935–36 Scottish Cup =

Tournament details
- Country: Scotland

Final positions
- Champions: Rangers
- Runners-up: Third Lanark

The 1935–36 Scottish Cup was the 58th staging of Scotland's most prestigious football knockout competition. The Cup was won by Rangers who defeated Third Lanark in the final.

== First round ==
Matches played 25 January 1936.

Home team	Score	Away team
Aberdeen	4 – 0	Kings Park
Albion	7 – 0	Wigtown & Bladnoch
Arbroath	1 – 3	Motherwell
Ayr United	2 – 3	St Mirren
Bo'ness	1 – 3	Airdrie
Burntisland Shipyard	2 – 2	Dumbarton
Clyde	2 – 1	Forfar Athletic
Dundee	6 – 0	Babcock & Wilcox
Dundee United	2 – 2	Alloa
Dunfermline	6 – 2	Brechin
East Stirlingshire	2 – 5	Kilmarnock
Edinburgh City	2 – 3	Cowdenbeath
Elgin City	2 – 2	Chirnside United
Galston	5 – 3	Stranraer
King's Park	6 – 1	Wick Academy
Leith Athletic	3 – 3	Buckie Thistle
Montrose	0 – 2	Falkirk
Morton	11 – 1	Blairgowrie
Peebles Rovers	3 – 3	Dalbeattie Star
Queen of the South	2 – 0	Partick Thistle
Raith Rovers	2 – 4	St Johnstone
Rangers	3– 1	East Fife
Ross County	0 – 5	St Bernard's
Stenhousemuir	1 – 0	Queen's Park
Third Lanark	2 – 0	Hearts
Vale OCOBA	1 – 3	Hibernian

Berwick Rangers were drawn to Celtic but worried that they would be unable to raise a team and the likelihood of difficult travel conditions decided to forfeit the tie and receive a payment of £120 from Celtic. In addition a friendly was arranged at Parkhead on 28 March between the teams with Celtic running out 6-0 winners.

=== Replays ===
Matches played between 29 January and 5 February 1936.

Home team	Score	Away team
Alloa	1 – 1	Dundee United
Buckie Thistle	1 – 2	Leith Athletic
Chirnside United	3 – 4	Elgin City
Dalbeattie Star	1 – 0	Peebles Rovers
Dumbarton	4 – 2	Burntisland Shipyard

=== Second replay ===
Match played 3 February 1936.

Home team	Score	Away team
Dundee United	2 – 1	Alloa

== Second round ==
Matches played 8 February 1936.

Home team	Score	Away team
Aberdeen	6 – 0	Kings Park
Albion	1 – 3	Rangers
Celtic	1 – 2	St Johnstone
Clyde	4 – 1	Hibernian
Cowdenbeath	5 – 3	Dundee United
Dalbeattie Star	0 – 1	St Mirren
Dundee	2 – 1	Airdrie
Dunfermline	5 – 2	Galston
Elgin	0 – 3	Queen of the South
Falkirk	1 – 1	Kilmarnock
Morton	3 – 0	Stenhousemuir
Motherwell	3 – 0	St Bernard's
Third Lanark	2 – 0	Leith Athletic

=== Replay ===
Match played 12 February 1936.

Home team	Score	Away team
Kilmarnock	1 – 2	Falkirk

== Third round ==
Matches played 22 February 1936.

Home team	Score	Away team
Aberdeen	1 – 1	St Johnstone
Clyde	1 – 1	Dundee
Cowdenbeath	1 – 3	Motherwell
Morton	2 – 0	Queen of the South
St Mirren	1 – 2	Rangers
Third Lanark	8 – 0	Dumbarton

=== Replays ===
Matches played 26 February 1936.

Home team	Score	Away team
Dundee	0 – 3	Clyde
St Johnstone	0 – 1	Aberdeen

== Quarter-finals ==
Matches played 7 March 1936.

Home team	Score	Away team
Aberdeen	0 – 1	Rangers
Clyde	3 – 2	Motherwell
Falkirk	5 – 0	Dunfermline
Morton	3 – 5	Third Lanark

== Semi-finals ==
28 March 1936

Rangers	3–0	Clyde
Meiklejohn 4'; McPhail 42'; Main 47'

Hampden Park, Glasgow
Attendance: 56,243
Referee: J.M. Martin

28 March 1936

Third Lanark	3–1	Falkirk
Carabine 36' (pen.); McInnes 75'; Kennedy 80'		Dawson 20'

Tynecastle Park, Edinburgh
Attendance: 47,796
Referee: M.C. Hutton

== Final ==
18 April 1936

Rangers	1–0	Third Lanark
McPhail

Hampden Park, Glasgow
Attendance: 88,859
Referee: J. M. Martin

=== Teams ===
Rangers:
GK	Jerry Dawson
RB	Dougie Gray
LB	William Cheyne
RH	Davie Meiklejohn
CH	Jimmy Simpson
LH	George Brown
OR	James Fiddes
IR	Alex Venters
CF	Jimmy Smith
IL	Bob McPhail
OL	Jim Turnbull

Third Lanark:
GK	Robert Muir
RB	Jimmy Carabine
LB	Bob Hamilton
RH	James Blair
CH	Jimmy Denmark
LH	Jimmy McInnes
OR	Bobby Howe
IR	Pat Gallacher
CF	George Hay
IL	Robert Kennedy
OL	Alex Kinnaird
