= Cliff Mansley =

English footballer

Personal information
- Full name: Vincent Clifford Mansley
- Date of birth: 5 April 1921
- Place of birth: Skipton, England
- Date of death: August 2006 (aged 85)
- Place of death: Lancashire, England
- Position: Right-half

Senior career*
Years	Team	Apps	(Gls)
1940–1945	Preston North End	0	(0)
1942–1943	→ Hamilton Academical (guest)	0	(0)
1944–1945	→ Dumbarton (guest)	0	(0)
1945–1946	→ Queen of the South (guest)	0	(0)
1945–1948	Barnsley	30	(0)
1948–1949	Chester	22	(0)
1949–1952	Yeovil Town		
1952–1953	Leyton Orient	10	(0)
1953–1954	Wigan Athletic	5	(1)
1954–195?	Street		
Total		62+	(0)
- * Club domestic league appearances and goals

Vincent Clifford Mansley (5 April 1921 – August 2006) was an English footballer who played as a right-half in the Football League for Chester, Preston North End, Hamilton, Dumbarton, Queen of the South and Barnsley.

He was signed by Wigan Athletic in July 1953, and made five appearances for the club in the Lancashire Combination, scoring one goal.
