= George Waddell (footballer) =

Scottish footballer

Personal information
- Full name: George Barr Waddell
- Date of birth: 19 April 1889 (Note: Joyce gives Waddell's date of birth as 29 November 1888, whereas Matthews gives 13 July 1889.)
- Place of birth: Lesmahagow, Scotland
- Date of death: 17 September 1966 (aged 77)
- Place of death: Sible Hedingham, England
- Height: 5 ft 8 1/2 in (1.74 m)
- Position: Wing half

Senior career*
Years	Team	Apps	(Gls)
- Dalziel Rovers
- Burnbank Athletic
- Larkhall United
1909–1913	Rangers	21	(0)
1912–1913	→ Kilmarnock (loan)		
1914–1920	Bradford City	23	(0)
1920–1922	Preston North End	51	(2)
1922	Oldham Athletic	1	(0)
1922–1923	Birmingham	2	(0)
1923	Hamilton Academical		
1923	New Brighton	3	(0)
1923–1924	Wolverhampton Wanderers	0	(0)
–	Aberaman Athletic		
–	Chorley		
–	Fraserburgh		
–	Ribble Motors		
- * Club domestic league appearances and goals

George Barr Waddell (19 April 1889 – 17 September 1966) was a Scottish professional footballer who played in the Scottish Football League for Rangers and in the Football League in England for Bradford City, Preston North End, Oldham Athletic, Birmingham and New Brighton. He played as a wing half.

Waddell was born in Lesmahagow, Lanarkshire. He began his football career in junior football before joining Rangers in 1909. He made his debut in Division One on 26 April 1909 in a 3–2 defeat to Queen's Park. Over the next four seasons he played 21 league games for Rangers, and spent time on loan at Kilmarnock. In June 1914, Bradford City paid £1,000 for Waddell's services. He played 23 First Division games either side of the First World War before joining Preston North End for a fee of £1,750 in September 1920. After two seasons and 51 First Division games he had brief spells with a succession of clubs: Oldham Athletic, who paid £250 for his services, Birmingham for £325, to Scotland with Hamilton Academical, back to England with New Brighton, and then Wolverhampton Wanderers, but without appearing for their league side. Waddell then had various player-coach roles, with Aberaman Athletic, Chorley and Fraserburgh, and had spells as reserve team coach and assistant trainer with former club Preston North End, and trainer with Dick, Kerr's Ladies, before finishing his football career with Ribble Motors.

Waddell died in Sible Hedingham, Essex, in 1966 at the age of 77.
