= Robert Howe (footballer) =

Scottish footballer

Personal information
- Date of birth: 3 August 1903
- Place of birth: Dumbarton, Scotland
- Date of death: 20 June 1979 (aged 75)
- Place of death: Glasgow, Scotland
- Height: 5 ft 8 in (1.73 m)
- Position: Left winger

Senior career*
Years	Team	Apps	(Gls)
- Shotts United
- Petershill
1927–1932	Hamilton Academical	159	(48)
1932–1934	Hearts	16	(4)
1934–1937	Third Lanark	90	(19)
1937	Queen of the South	13	(1)
1937–1938	St Johnstone	14	(3)
1938–1939	Dundee United	18	(2)
Total		310	(77)

International career
1929	Scotland	2	(0)
- * Club domestic league appearances and goals

Robert Howe (3 August 1903 – 20 June 1979) was a Scottish footballer who played as a left winger.

== Career ==
Born in Dumbarton, Howe played club football for Hamilton Academical, Hearts, Third Lanark, Queen of the South, St Johnstone and Dundee United, and made two appearances for Scotland – he was the first serving Hamilton player to be capped for his country.

At club level, his most notable achievements were winning Scottish Football League Division Two with Third Lanark in 1934–35 and reaching the final of the Scottish Cup with the club one year later (the match was lost to Rangers).
