= George Law (footballer, born 1885) =

Scottish footballer

Personal information
- Full name: George Law
- Date of birth: 13 December 1885
- Place of birth: Arbroath, Scotland
- Date of death: 9 September 1969 (aged 83)
- Place of death: Glasgow, Scotland
- Height: 5 ft 9 in (1.75 m)
- Position: Right-back

Youth career
- Lochside
- Arbroath Dauntless

Senior career*
Years	Team	Apps	(Gls)
1905–1907	Arbroath		
1907–1912	Rangers	96	(1)
1912–1916	Leeds City	105	(1)
1916–1919	Rangers	4	(0)
1917	→ Partick Thistle (loan)	4	(0)
1919–1922	Arbroath	32	(0)
Total		241	(2)

International career
1910	Scotland	3	(0)
- * Club domestic league appearances and goals

George Law (13 December 1885 – 9 September 1969) was a Scottish footballer who played as a right back.

He began his career at local club Arbroath and moved to Rangers in 1907. Law became a favourite among the Ibrox fans for his determined, hard-tackling defensive style. Playing during the William Wilton era, he won a Scottish league championship medal in 1911, one Glasgow Cup, and two Glasgow Merchants Charity Cups. He never won a Scottish Cup, but did play in the abandoned 1909 Scottish Cup Final.

Law left Rangers and moved to Leeds City in 1912. During World War I he returned to Glasgow to work at shipyards on the River Clyde, signing again for Rangers and spending a short time on loan with Partick Thistle. He returned to part-time Arbroath in the early 1920s. After retirement from football, he went into the motor engineering business.
