= 1944–45 Southern Football League (Scotland) =

The 1944–45 Southern Football League was the fifth edition of the regional war-time football league tournament.

== Table ==
Pos	Team	Pld	W	D	L	GF	GA	GD	Pts
1	Rangers (C)	30	23	3	4	88	27	+61	49
2	Celtic	30	20	2	8	70	42	+28	42
3	Motherwell	30	18	5	7	83	54	+29	41
4	Clyde	30	18	0	12	80	61	+19	36
5	Heart of Midlothian	30	14	7	9	75	60	+15	35
6	Hibernian	30	15	5	10	69	51	+18	35
7	Morton	30	16	1	13	71	60	+11	33
8	Falkirk	30	14	3	13	67	57	+10	31
9	Hamilton Academical	30	12	5	13	77	86	−9	29
10	Queen's Park	30	12	4	14	60	62	−2	28
11	Partick Thistle	30	12	1	17	55	74	−19	25
12	Third Lanark	30	11	3	16	55	65	−10	25
13	Dumbarton (R)	30	9	3	18	51	84	−33	21
14	St Mirren	30	7	6	17	45	71	−26	20
15	Albion Rovers (R)	30	7	2	21	42	104	−62	16
16	Airdrieonians (R)	30	4	6	20	43	73	−30	14

Source: The Celtic Wiki – Southern Football League
Rules for classification: 1) points; 2) goal difference; 3) number of goals scored.
(C) Champions; (R) Relegated
