= Thomas Gilchrist (footballer) =

Scottish footballer

Personal information
- Full name: Thomas Gilchrist
- Date of birth: 29 December 1885
- Place of birth: Larkhall, Scotland
- Position: Inside right

Senior career*
Years	Team	Apps	(Gls)
- Shettleston
1905–1908	Third Lanark	40	(8)
1908	→ Hearts (loan)	8	(2)
1908–1910	Rangers	21	(6)
1910–1911	Kilmarnock	26	(5)
1911–1914	Motherwell	85	(23)
1914–1915	Rangers	0	(0)
1915–1916	Dumbarton	19	(2)
1920–1921	King's Park		
1921–1922	Bo'ness	3	(1)
1922	Clackmannan	1	(0)
Total		203	(47)
- * Club domestic league appearances and goals

Thomas Gilchrist (born 29 December 1885) was a Scottish footballer who played for Third Lanark, Heart of Midlothian, Rangers (two spells, though no appearances in the second having signed up for military service in World War I), Kilmarnock, Motherwell, Dumbarton, King's Park, Bo'ness and Clackmannan, mainly as an inside right.
