= Willie Thornton =

Scottish footballer and manager (1920–1991)

Personal information
- Full name: Willam Thornton
- Date of birth: 3 March 1920
- Place of birth: Winchburgh, Scotland
- Date of death: 26 August 1991 (aged 71)
- Position: Striker

Senior career*
Years	Team	Apps	(Gls)
1936–1954	Rangers	219	(138)

International career
1946–1952	Scotland	8	(1)
1949	Scottish Football League XI	1	(0)

Managerial career
- 1954–1959: Dundee
- 1959–1968: Partick Thistle
- 1969: Rangers (caretaker)
- * Club domestic league appearances and goals

William Thornton MM (3 March 1920 – 26 August 1991) was a Scottish footballer and manager. Thornton's entire senior playing career was spent with Rangers, and Thornton is considered to be one of the greatest players in the club's history.

== Football career ==
Thornton played for Rangers from 1936 to 1954, then became a manager with first Dundee and then Partick Thistle. Thornton later returned to Rangers as assistant manager to Davie White in the summer of 1968 and was briefly caretaker manager in 1969 after White's dismissal. Thornton then worked as assistant to William Waddell until 1972. The club won the two matches when Thornton was in charge. Thornton is one of Scotland's all-time top goalscorers, with 138 league goals.

== Military career ==
Thornton served in World War II in the Scottish Horse fighting in the Italian campaign at the battle of Anzio, and winning the Military Medal for his bravery during the invasion of Sicily. Later in the war, Thornton played football for a British Eighth Army team that also included George Hamilton and Tom Finney.

== Death ==
Thornton died on 26 August 1991, aged 71 years old.

== Honours ==
=== Manager ===
Dundee

- Forfarshire Cup : 1954–55, 1955–56
