= Jimmy Duncanson =

Scottish footballer

Personal information
- Date of birth: 13 October 1919
- Place of birth: Dennistoun, Scotland
- Date of death: 1 September 1996 (aged 76)
- Position: Forward

Youth career
- Dunoon Athletic

Senior career*
| Years | Team | Apps | (Gls) |
| 1946–1950 | Rangers | 93 | (40) |
| 1950–1953 | St Mirren | 23 | (4) |
- Stranraer
| Total | | 116 | (44) |

International career
| 1946 | Scotland | 1 | (0) |
| 1948 | Scottish League XI | 1 | (1) |
- * Club domestic league appearances and goals

James Duncanson (13 October 1919 – 1 September 1996) was a professional football striker who played for Rangers, St Mirren and Stranraer. His Rangers career started during World War II, and lasted until 1950, winning a total of 23 medals with the club.

Duncanson achieved a number of records for Rangers: he is the clubs' third-top all time scorer (with 22 goals) against rivals Celtic, behind R.C. Hamilton and Ally McCoist, he scored Rangers' 4000th league goal as part of a hat-trick in a match against Dundee at Dens Park on Christmas Day 1947, and he scored the first hat-trick in an Old Firm match for Rangers in the 20th century.

In total he made 302 appearances for Rangers (162 of which are unofficial as they took place during World War II), scoring 147 goals (88 wartime). He won the league twice for Rangers, as well as three Scottish Cups and two League Cups. He was capped once for Scotland, as well as on two occasions during the war. After retiring from football, Duncanson remained a fervent Rangers supporter and was regularly seen at Ibrox as a spectator.
