= James Bowie (footballer) =

Scottish footballer and administrator

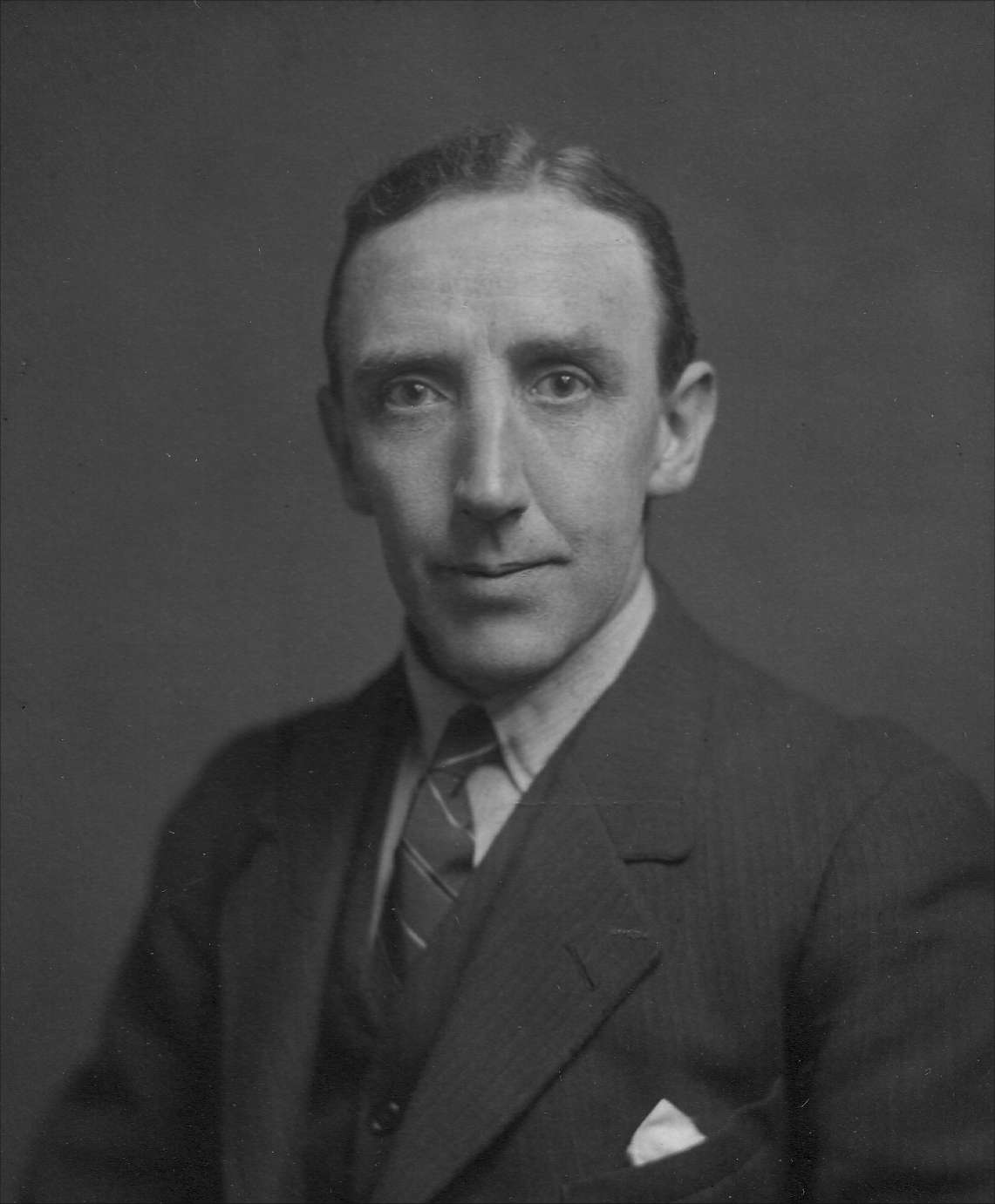

Personal information
- Full name: James M. Bowie
- Date of birth: 9 July 1888
- Place of birth: Partick, Scotland
- Date of death: 7 August 1972 (aged 84)
- Place of death: Glasgow, Scotland
- Positions: Wing half; inside forward

Senior career*
Years	Team	Apps	(Gls)
- Maryhill
1908–1910	Queen's Park	67	(5)
1910–1922	Rangers	299	(62)
Total		366	(67)

International career
1911–1919	Scottish League XI	5	(2)
1918–1919	Scotland (wartime)	4	(1)
1920	Scotland	2	(0)
- * Club domestic league appearances and goals

James Bowie (9 July 1888 – 7 August 1972) was a Scottish football player and football administrator, who played for and was chairman of Rangers.

== Playing career ==
Bowie began his career at Maryhill Juniors and joined Rangers in December 1910 from Queen's Park. He made his debut against Falkirk on 10 December 1910. During his time at the club he won six League championships and played in a total of 351 competitive games, scoring 70 goals.

Bowie won two Scotland caps in 1920, and also played in four wartime internationals. He retired in 1922.

== Football administrator ==
After retiring, he became a club director in 1925 and served as chairman from 1934 until 1947. The circumstances for Bowie's departure as chairman were due to a boardroom coup, after he suggested that then manager Bill Struth retire, being that he was 71 years old.

He was also president of the Scottish Football League from 1939 to 1946.

== Honours ==
- Scottish League: 1910–11, 1911–12, 1912–13, 1917–18, 1919–20, 1920–21
- Scottish Cup: Runner-up: 1920–21
- Glasgow Cup: 1913–14, 1917–18, 1918–19
