= 1940–41 Dumbarton F.C. season =

Dumbarton
1940–1941 season
- Stadium: Boghead Park, Dumbarton
- Scottish Southern League: 14th
- Summer Cup: Semi-final
- League Cup South: Prelims
- Top goalscorer: League: Stan Williams (11); All: Stan Williams (16)

The 1940–41 season was the second Scottish football season in which Dumbarton competed in regional football during World War II.

== Scottish Southern League ==
It was the intention of the Scottish League to start up operations again this season, but after the fall of France, it was decided that the League would cease all operations until the war was over. Nevertheless, it was left to the clubs themselves to organise themselves and to this end the clubs in the 'central belt' established the Scottish Southern League. 13 of the clubs who had played in the Western Division the previous season competed, along with Falkirk, Hearts and Hibernian, who took the places of Ayr United, Kilmarnock and Queen of the South. Dumbarton finished 14th out of 16 with 24 points - 32 behind champions Rangers.

10 August 1940 League	Partick Thistle	5–2	Dumbarton	Firhill Park
	Younger 10', 68'; Picken 20'; Husband 58'; Busby 71'		Gilmour 36'; Drysdale 44'	Attendance: 4,000; Referee: J Martin

17 August 1940 League	Dumbarton	2–3	Motherwell	Boghead Park
	Gilmour 10'; Drysdale 49'		Bremner; McDowall; Ogilvie 74'	Attendance: 6,000; Referee: H Watson

24 August 1940 League	Airdrie	6–1	Dumbarton	Broomfield Park
	Connor 14'; Russell 16'; Mooney 21', 81' (pen.); Flavell 48'; McAloon 52'		Williams 65'	Attendance: 3,500; Referee: J Baillie

31 August 1940 League	Dumbarton	6–4	Third Lanark	Boghead Park
	Williams 9'; McGrogan 29', 78'; Shields 52', 68'; Telfer 81'		Johnstone 8'; Sinclair 14'; Jones (35l), 44'	Attendance: 4,500; Referee: C Faultless

7 September 1940 League	Falkirk	3–3	Dumbarton	Brockville Park
	Dawson 13', 43'; Keys 53'		Shields 20'; McGrogan 35'; Ferguson 88'	Attendance: 3,000; Referee: R Benzie

14 September 1940 League	Dumbarton	3–4	St Mirren	Boghead Park
	Drysdale 8'; Williams 19'; Cheyne 58' (pen.)		Brady 42'; Linwood 52'; Deakin 78', 80'	Attendance: 6,000; Referee: W Webb

21 September 1940 League	Celtic	1–0	Dumbarton	Celtic Park
	McDonald 35'			Attendance: 5,500; Referee: R Benzie

28 September 1940 League	Dumbarton	2–0	Hibernian	Boghead Park
	Shields 15'; Cheyne 25' (pen.)			Attendance: 4,500; Referee: C Faultless

5 October 1940 League	Clyde	2–2	Dumbarton	Shawfield Stadium
	Agnew 28'; Wallace 54'		Shields 18'; Gilmour 59'	Attendance: 4,500; Referee: W Robertson

12 October 1940 League	Dumbarton	2–1	Queen's Park	Boghead Park
	Cheyne 11'; McGrogan 57'		Gray 38'	Attendance: 4,000; Referee: J Martin

19 October 1940 League	Morton	2–1	Dumbarton	Cappielow Park
	Smeaton 55'; Gardiner 86'		Williams 13'	Referee: J Martin

26 October 1940 League	Dumbarton	1–4	Rangers	Boghead Park
	Drysdale 83'		Smith 12', 30', 38'; Waddell 28'	Attendance: 9,000; Referee: J Smillie

9 November 1940 League	Dumbarton	1–4	Hearts	Boghead Park
	Milne 66'		Fitzgerald 18'; Walker 29'; Money 42', 56'	Attendance: 3,500; Referee: J Martin

16 November 1940 League	Hamilton	3–0	Dumbarton	Douglas Park
	Wilson 9', 82'; Cassidy 74'			Attendance: 3,000; Referee: M Hutton

23 November 1940 League	Dumbarton	2–0	Partick Thistle	Boghead Park
	Williams 27', 61'			Attendance: 2,000; Referee: W McCulloch

30 November 1940 League	Motherwell	4–1	Dumbarton	Fir Park
	McCulloch 18', 62', 63'; Main 24'		Taylor 65'	Attendance: 1,000; Referee: M Dale

7 December 1940 League	Dumbarton	3–3	Airdrie	Boghead Park
	McGrogan 18'; Mathie 37', 60'		Mooney 41', 85' (pen.); White 54'	Attendance: 3,500; Referee: M Hutton

14 December 1940 League	Third Lanark	4–1	Dumbarton	Cathkin Park
	Connor 9'; Melville 32'; Joyner 37'; Glamis 70'		McGrogan 42'	Attendance: 1,000; Referee: C Dale

21 December 1940 League	Dumbarton	2–3	Celtic	Boghead Park
	Williams 32'; Milne 52'		Crum 11'; Gillan 35'; Murphy 43'	Attendance: 4,500; Referee: H Watson

28 December 1940 League	St Mirren	4–0	Dumbarton	Love Street (stadium)
	Stead 7'; Steele 33'; Linwood 37'; Kelly 77'			Attendance: 2,000; Referee: J Martin

1 January 1941 League	Dumbarton	2–1	Falkirk	Boghead Park
	Milne 69'; Williams 80'		Napier 52'	Attendance: 2,000; Referee: R Scott

11 January 1941 League	Dumbarton	2–1	Clyde	Boghead Park
	Jeffrey 8'; Henderson 32'		Martin 18'	Attendance: 5,000; Referee: J Boyd

18 January 1941 League	Queen's Park	2–3	Dumbarton	Hampden Park
	Aitken 12', 41'		Milne 56' (pen.), 69', 80'	Attendance: 1,000; Referee: J Martin

25 January 1941 League	Dumbarton	2–4	Morton	Boghead Park
	Jeffreys		Newman; Ferguson; Calder	Attendance: 2,500; Referee: C Faultless

1 February 1941 League	Rangers	1–1	Dumbarton	Ibrox Park
	Smith 7'		Jeffreys 80'	Attendance: 7,500; Referee: M Dale

8 February 1941 League	Dumbarton	4–1	Albion Rovers	Boghead Park
	Jeffrey 13'; McGrogan 23'; Henderson 62'; Smith 87'		McGillivray 70'	Attendance: 2,000; Referee: J Boyd

15 February 1941 League	Hearts	3–1	Dumbarton	Tynecastle Stadium
	Blyth 14'; Fitzgerald 53'; Walker 88' (pen.)		Jeffrey 43'	Attendance: 3,000; Referee: H Watson

22 February 1941 League	Dumbarton	5–1	Hamilton	Boghead Park
	Drysdale 5'; Milne 19', 87'; Williams 43', 50'		Wilson 29'	Attendance: 2,000; Referee: R Scott

26 April 1941 League	Hibernian	3–1	Dumbarton	Easter Road Stadium
	Yorston 63'; Finnigan 80', 87'		Williams 7'	Attendance: 2,000

3 May 1941 League	Albion Rovers	1–2	Dumbarton	Cliftonhill
	Bell 70'		Jeffrey 5'; Williams 57'	Referee: J Horsburgh

== League Cup South ==
To complete the fixture list, two further competitions were introduced restricted to the 16 'South' league members. The League Cup South was established, beginning with 4 sections of 4 teams playing on a 'home and away' basis, followed by semi finals and a final. Unfortunately Dumbarton did not progress beyond the section prelims.

1 March 1941 Group C	Third Lanark	4–2	Dumbarton	Cathkin Park
	Glancy 22'; Connor 50', 86'; Sinclair 60' (pen.)		Milne 16'; Jeffrey 89'	Attendance: 3,000; Referee: J Horsburgh

8 March 1941 Group C	Dumbarton	1–8	Rangers	Boghead Park
	McGrogan 35'		Johnstone 4'; Brown 23', 77', 87'; Smith 29', 73', 85'; Venters 57'	Attendance: 6,000

15 March 1941 Group C	Falkirk	1–0	Dumbarton	Brockville Park
	Dawson 64'			Attendance: 4,000; Referee: J Horsburgh

22 March 1941 Group C	Dumbarton	2–0	Third Lanark	Boghead Park
	Williams 43', 65'			Attendance: 2,500; Referee: M Dale

29 March 1941 Group C	Rangers	6–3	Dumbarton	Ibrox Park
	Smith 12', 82'; Gillick 14'; Marshall 15'; Johnstone 74', 89'		Williams 35'; Jeffrey 65'; Shields 72'	Attendance: 4,000; Referee: W Robertson

5 April 1941 Group C	Dumbarton	3–0	Falkirk	Boghead Park
	Williams 47', 82'; Jeffrey 85'			Attendance: 2,000; Referee: R Benzie

== Summer Cup ==
Dumbarton reached the semi-final before losing to eventual champions Hibernian.

7 June 1941 Cup R1(1)	Motherwell	2–2	Dumbarton	Fir Park
	Main 8'; Bremner 11'		Rodger 13'; Ross 22'	Attendance: 2,000; Referee: R Scott

14 June 1941 Cup R1(2)	Dumbarton	3–0 (5-3 agg.)	Motherwell	Boghead Park
	Rodger 12'; Milne 18' (pen.); Savage 65'			Attendance: 5,000; Referee: R Scott

21 June 1941 Cup R2(1)	Third Lanark	0–1	Dumbarton	Cathkin Park
			McGrogan 74'	Attendance: 8,000; Referee: J Davie

28 June 1941 Cup R1(2)	Dumbarton	4–0 (5-0 agg.)	Third Lanark	Boghead Park
	Jeffrey 10', 18', 86'; Rodger 83'			Attendance: 6,000; Referee: J Boyd

5 July 1941 Cup SF	Dumbarton	0–1	Hibernian	Tynecastle Stadium
			Milne 55'	Attendance: 15,000; Referee: J Boyd

== Player statistics ==
No.	Pos	Nat	Player	Total		Southern Division		Summer Cup		League Cup	
No.	Pos	Nat	Player	Apps	Goals	Apps	Goals	Apps	Goals	Apps	Goals
	GK	(Scotland) SCO	John Hill	6	0	6	0	0	0	0	0
	GK	(Scotland) SCO	Jock Wallace	35	0	24	0	5	0	6	0
	DF	(Scotland) SCO	James Bulloch	2	0	2	0	0	0	0	0
	DF	(Scotland) SCO	Andy Cheyne	32	3	26	3	0	0	6	0
	DF	(Scotland) SCO	Henry Dornan	33	0	27	0	0	0	6	0
	DF	(Scotland) SCO	Jimmy Hickie	5	0	0	0	5	0	0	0
	DF	(Scotland) SCO	Johnny Soutar	15	0	14	0	0	0	1	0
	MF	(Scotland) SCO	William Aird	5	0	0	0	5	0	0	0
	MF	(Scotland) SCO	William Brown	31	1	25	1	0	0	6	0
	MF	(Scotland) SCO	John Casey	2	0	2	0	0	0	0	0
	MF	(Scotland) SCO	John Drysdale	29	5	24	5	0	0	5	0
	MF	(Scotland) SCO	Charlie Ferguson	9	1	9	1	0	0	0	0
	MF	(Scotland) SCO	Charlie Gavin	5	0	0	0	5	0	0	0
	MF	(Scotland) SCO	Hugh Hart	34	0	28	0	0	0	6	0
	MF	(Scotland) SCO	Frank Moulds	1	0	1	0	0	0	0	0
	MF	(Scotland) SCO	Willie Savage	5	1	0	0	5	1	0	0
	MF	(Scotland) SCO	Willie Telfer	2	1	2	1	0	0	0	0
	MF	(Scotland) SCO	George Urquhart	5	0	0	0	5	0	0	0
	FW	(Scotland) SCO	Thomas Gilmour	12	3	12	3	0	0	0	0
	FW	(Scotland) SCO	George Hay	2	0	2	0	0	0	0	0
	FW	(Scotland) SCO	George Henderson	10	1	8	1	0	0	2	0
	FW	(Scotland) SCO	George Jeffrey	21	12	10	6	5	3	6	3
	FW	(Scotland) SCO	Geoffrey Lockwood	1	0	0	0	0	0	1	0
	FW	(Scotland) SCO	David Mathie	6	2	5	2	0	0	1	0
	FW	(Scotland) SCO	Felix McGrogan	33	9	23	7	5	1	5	1
	FW	(Scotland) SCO	Jackie Milne	35	10	24	8	5	1	6	1
	FW	(Scotland) SCO	Fally Rodger	5	2	0	0	5	2	0	0
	FW	(Scotland) SCO	Sammy Ross	5	2	0	0	5	2	0	0
	FW	(Scotland) SCO	James Shields	24	6	20	5	0	0	4	1
	FW	(Scotland) SCO	Smith	1	1	1	1	0	0	0	0
	FW	(Scotland) SCO	George Steele	1	0	1	0	0	0	0	0
	FW	(Scotland) SCO	Archibald Taylor	3	1	3	1	0	0	0	0
	FW	(South Africa) RSA	Stan Williams	34	16	28	11	0	0	6	5
	FW	(Scotland) SCO	Trialist/s	4	0	4	0	0	0	0	0

=== Internationalist/Representative ===
On 8 February 1941, Jackie Milne played for Scotland in an unofficial international match against England at Newcastle - the Scots winning 3–2.

Two weeks prior, on 25 January 1941, Milne played for an SFA Select against an Army XI, with the SFA gaining a narrow 1–0 victory.

=== Transfers ===
==== Players in ====
Player	From	Date
(Scotland) Willie Dunn	(Scotland) Raith Rovers (guest)	30 Nov 1939
(Scotland) John Hill	(Scotland) Cowdenbeath (guest)	31 Jul 1940
(Scotland) Felix McGrogan	(Scotland) Kilmarnock (guest)	31 Jul 1940
(Scotland) James Shields	(Scotland) Celtic (guest)	31 Jul 1940
(Scotland) James Bulloch	(Scotland) Alloa Athletic (guest)	3 Aug 1940
(Scotland) John Soutar	(Scotland) Montrose (guest)	3 Aug 1940
(Scotland) Thomas Gilmour	(Scotland) Rangers (guest)	5 Aug 1940
(Scotland) John Drysdale	(Scotland) Kilmarnock (guest)	6 Aug 1940
(Scotland) Charlie Ferguson	(Scotland) Aberdeen (guest)	6 Aug 1940
(Scotland) Frank Moulds	(Scotland) St Johnstone (guest)	6 Aug 1940
(Scotland) George Hay	(Scotland) Queen of the South (guest)	8 Aug 1940
(Scotland) Alfred Williams	(Scotland) Aberdeen (guest)	10 Aug 1940
(Scotland) Andy Cheyne	(Scotland) Motherwell (guest)	22 Aug 1940
(Scotland) William Telfer	(Scotland) Motherwell (guest)	22 Aug 1940
(Scotland) Hugh Hart	(Scotland) Dunfermline Athletic (guest)	23 Aug 1940
(Scotland) Henry Dornan	(Scotland) Kilmarnock (guest)	27 Aug 1940
(Scotland) Jackie Milne	(England) Middlesbrough (guest)	30 Aug 1940
(Scotland) William Brown	(Scotland) Falkirk (guest)	13 Sep 1940
(Scotland) Jock Wallace	(England) Blackpool (guest)	19 Sep 1940
(Scotland) George Steele	(Scotland) Morton (guest)	5 Oct 1940
(Scotland) Archibald Taylor	(Scotland) Clyde (guest)	8 Nov 1940
(Scotland) David Mathie	(Scotland) Motherwell (guest)	5 Dec 1940
(Scotland) George Henderson	(Scotland) Wishaw	18 Jan 1941
(Scotland) George Jeffrey	(Scotland) Wishaw	24 Jan 1941
(Scotland) Jeffrey Lockwood	(England) Manchester City	15 Mar 1941
(Scotland) William Aird	(Scotland) St Bernard's (guest)	
(Scotland) Charlie Gavin	(Scotland) Arbroath (guest)	
(Scotland) Jimmy Hickie	(Scotland) Clyde (guest)	
(Scotland) Fally Rodger	(England) Northampton Town (guest)	
(Scotland) Sammy Ross	(Scotland) Falkirk (guest)	
(Scotland) William Savage	(Scotland) Queen of the South (guest)	
(Scotland) George Urquhart	(Scotland) Arbroath (guest)	

==== Players out ====
Player	To	Date
(Scotland) David Cowan	(Scotland) Stenhousemuir	
(Scotland) Bobby Speedie	(Scotland) Clydebank Juniors	

In addition James Brown, John Forsyth, John Getty, John McBride, David McLean and William Nichol all played their last games in Dumbarton 'colours'.
