= 1939–40 Dumbarton F.C. season =

Dumbarton
1939–1940 season
- Manager: Jimmy Smith
- Stadium: Boghead Park, Dumbarton
- Scottish Western Division: 16th
- War Emergency Cup: Second Round
- Top goalscorer: League: Alex Stewart (7); All: Alex Stewart(7)

Due to the outbreak of WW2, there was no 'official' senior football competition in Scotland, with the Scottish Football League and the Scottish Cup both suspended for the duration. Therefore, the 1939–40 season was the first Scottish football season in which Dumbarton competed in the 'emergency' competitions which were arranged by the clubs themselves.

== Scottish Second Division ==
Four games into the season, Britain was at war with Nazi Germany and all official Scottish football competition was suspended for its duration.

12 August 1939 League	Leith Athletic	1–2; VOID	Dumbarton	Old Meadowbank
	O'Rawe 80'		Nichol 60'; Getty 85'	Referee: J Rennie

19 August 1939 League	Dumbarton	3–3; VOID	East Fife	Boghead Park
	Cowan 32'; McBride 37'; Nichol 50'		McKerrel 19'; Adams 58'; Wilkie 84'	Attendance: 5,500; Referee: J Mackay

26 August 1939 League	Dundee	3–1; VOID	Dumbarton	Dens Park
	Warnock 23'; Coats 36'; Adam		McBride 51'	Referee: J Smillie

2 September 1939 League	Dumbarton	3–2; VOID	Edinburgh City	Boghead Park
	Cowan 63', 70', 82'		Brown 30', 57'	Attendance: 3,000; Referee: W Hendry

== Scottish Western Division ==
In October 1939, in the absence of official competition, the clubs themselves wanted competitive football to continue in some form and arranged for two regional leagues of 16 teams each to be played, with Dumbarton playing in the Western Division – along with the likes of Celtic, Rangers etc. – teams they had not played since being relegated in 1922. Most of the First Division players were already contracted to play for their league opponents and it was no surprise that in this first season of the 'wartime' league, Dumbarton finished bottom (16th out of 16) with 18 points – 30 behind champions Rangers.

21 October 1939 League	Dumbarton	1–3	Queen's Park	Boghead Park
	Cowan (pen.)		Kyle	Attendance: 4,000; Referee: R Carruthers

28 October 1939 League	Kilmarnock	5–0	Dumbarton	Rugby Park
	Collins 21', 38', 47'; Thomson 71'			Attendance: 3,000

4 November 1939 League	Dumbarton	4–1	Albion Rovers	Boghead Park
	Browning 3'; Speedie 27'; Murray 63'; Mills 70'		Sharp 85'	Attendance: 5,000; Referee: J Mackay

11 November 1939 League	Clyde	3–3	Dumbarton	Rugby Park
	Wallace 40', 58'; Mills 63'		Mills 1'; Murray 5', 50'	Attendance: 3,000

18 November 1939 League	Dumbarton	2–1	Hamilton	Boghead Park
	McCulloch; Harrison		Lang	Attendance: 6,000; Referee: R Scott

25 November 1939 League	Rangers	2–1	Dumbarton	Ibrox Park
	Thornton 70'; Venters 75'		Murray 19'	Attendance: 7,000; Referee: W Webb

2 December 1939 League	Airdrie	3–2	Dumbarton	Broomfield Park
	Mooney 2', 52', 88'		Dunn 31'; Mills 71' (pen.)	Referee: R Scott

9 December 1939 League	Dumbarton	2–1	Ayr United	Boghead Park
	Mills 4'; Dunn 51'		Clark 87'	Attendance: 1,500; Referee: J Thomson

16 December 1939 League	Motherwell	5–1	Dumbarton	Fir Park
	Ogilvie 30', 41', 56'; Wood 63'; Wales 65'		Mathers 88' (pen.)	Attendance: 2,500; Referee: J Mackay

23 December 1939 League	Dumbarton	1–5	Celtic	Boghead Park
	Mathers 15' (pen.)		Divers 16', 80'; Gould 44', 82'; McDonald 55'	Attendance: 7.000

30 December 1939 League	Partick Thistle	0–4	Dumbarton	Firhill Park
			Collins 27', 83'; Nichol; Dunn 60'	Attendance: 4,000; Referee: R Carruthers

1 January 1940 League	Dumbarton	3–2	Morton	Boghead Park
	Milne; Speedie		Milne; Calder

2 January 1940 League	Queen of the South	3–1	Dumbarton	Palmerston Park
	Lang; Fitzsimmons; Connor		Milne

6 January 1940 League	Dumbarton	3–2	St Mirren	Boghead Park
	Milne; Speedie; Mathers		Brady	Attendance: 3,500

10 February 1940 League	Dumbarton	1–2	Clyde	Boghead Park
	Browning		McLaren; Agnew	Attendance: 3,000; Referee: W Webb

17 February 1940 League	Hamilton	4–2	Dumbarton	Douglas Park
	Wilson; McAloon; McIntyre; McKerracher		Collins; Milne

16 March 1940 League	Dumbarton	0–1	Motherwell	Boghead Park
			Ogilvie 44'	Attendance: 2,000; Referee: R Carruthers

23 March 1940 League	Celtic	4–0	Dumbarton	Celtic Park
	McDonald; Geatons; Divers; Kelly

27 March 1940 League	Third Lanark	3–2	Dumbarton	Cathkin Park
	Jones; Stephenson; Watters		Lang; Speedie

30 March 1940 League	Dumbarton	0–0	Partick Thistle	Boghead Park
				Attendance: 2,000; Referee: J Smillie

2 April 1940 League	Queen's Park	4–1	Dumbarton	Hampden Park
	Aitken; Wright		McLean	Attendance: 4,000; Referee: H Watson

6 April 1940 League	Morton	5–0	Dumbarton	Cappielow Park
	Turnbull; Calder; Steel

10 April 1940 League	Dumbarton	2–2	Kilmarnock	Boghead Park
	Mathers 30' (pen.); Dunn 44'		Newman 15'; Gallacher

13 April 1940 League	Dumbarton	1–3	Queen of the South	Boghead Park
	Stewart,A 60'		Connor 5', 26'; Dawson 60'	Attendance: 2,000

17 April 1940 League	Albion Rovers	3–1	Dumbarton	Cliftonhill
	Dempsey; Burke		Stewart, A	Referee: R Benzie

20 April 1940 League	St Mirren	1–2	Dumbarton	Love Street (stadium)
	Deakin 18'		Shields 15'; Casey 25'	Attendance: 2,000; Referee: H Watson

24 April 1940 League	Dumbarton	2–3	Rangers	Boghead Park
	Stewart, A 12' 87'		McPherson 18', 47'; McPhail	Attendance: 2,500

27 April 1940 League	Dumbarton	3–2	Third Lanark	Boghead Park
	Shields; Stewart, A		Jones	Attendance: 2,000

4 May 1940 League	Dumbarton	0–1	Airdrie	Boghead Park
			Soutar 77' (o.g.)	Attendance: 1,800; Referee: R Scott

11 May 1940 League	Ayr United	4–4	Dumbarton	Somerset Park
	Rodgers 7', 44', 50'; Clark 10'		Shields 5', 23'; Stewart,A 56', 71'	Attendance: 7,000; Referee: J Thomson

== Scottish War Emergency Cup ==
In place of the Scottish Cup, a Scottish War Emergency Cup was established, to be played for by all the teams competing in the regional leagues. Dumbarton reached the second round before losing to Airdrie.

24 February 1940 Cup R1(1)	Dumbarton	4–3	Arbroath	Boghead Park
	Dunn 24'; Milne; Lang 70'		Miller 61'; Mudie	Attendance: 4,500; Referee: C Faultless

2 March 1940 Cup R1(2)	Arbroath	0–2 (3-6 agg.)	Dumbarton	Gayfield Park
			Dunn 7', 78'	Attendance: 2,157

9 March 1940 Cup R2	Dumbarton	0–2	Airdrie	Boghead Park
			Reid 65'; Flavell 75'	Attendance: 5,500; Referee: R Benzie

== Dumbartonshire Cup ==
While the Dumbartonshire Cup competition had been discontinued some years earlier, during the weeks following the suspension of official competition and the start of the regional leagues, Dumbarton played Vale of Leven (a junior football side) for custody of the trophy, and the senior team duly won the day.

30 September 1939 Final	Dumbarton	4–2	Vale of Leven	Boghead Park
	McBride; Nichol (o.g.)		Goal

== Stirlingshire Cup ==
Following the demise of the Dumbartonshire Association, Dumbarton had been accepted as members of the Stirlingshire Association, and took part for the first time in the Stirlingshire Cup. Dumbarton were knocked out at the semi-final stage by Falkirk, although the competition was never completed.

16 August 1939 First Round	Dumbarton	9–1	Falkirk Amateurs	Boghead Park
	Cowan; Nichol; Getty; Nesbit		Goal	Attendance: 2,000

7 October 1939 Semi-final	Falkirk	3–2	Dumbarton	Brockville Park
	Dawson 10'; McPhee 15' (pen.); Stewart 78'		Nichol 40' mcLean	Attendance: 4,000; Referee: W McCulloch

== Friendly ==
14 October 1935 Friendly	Dumbarton	4–3	Rangers 'A'	Boghead Park
	Nichol; Lang; Speedie		Goal	Attendance: 3,000

== Player statistics ==
Players registrations were effectively cancelled and wages fixed at £2 per week which meant that players were free to sign for clubs local to their war work as 'guest players'.

No.	Pos	Nat	Player	Total		Western Division		Emergency Cup	
No.	Pos	Nat	Player	Apps	Goals	Apps	Goals	Apps	Goals
	GK	(Scotland) SCO	John Hill	6	0	6	0	0	0
	GK	(Scotland) SCO	William Morrison	1	0	1	0	0	0
	GK	(Scotland) SCO	Duncan Yuill	26	0	23	0	3	0
	DF	(Scotland) SCO	James Brown	4	0	4	0	0	0
	DF	(Scotland) SCO	John Casey	19	1	16	1	3	0
	DF	(Scotland) SCO	Johnny Soutar	33	0	30	0	3	0
	DF	(Scotland) SCO	Willie Steel	19	0	19	0	0	0
	DF	(Scotland) SCO	Kenneth Stewart	2	0	2	0	0	0
	MF	(Scotland) SCO	John Browning	28	2	25	2	3	0
	MF	(Scotland) SCO	Robert Fraser	6	0	6	0	0	0
	MF	(Scotland) SCO	John Mathers	26	4	24	4	2	0
	MF	(Scotland) SCO	David McLean	18	2	17	2	1	0
	MF	(Scotland) SCO	Stephen Murray	9	4	9	4	0	0
	MF	(Scotland) SCO	Fulton Wilson	15	0	13	0	2	0
	FW	(Scotland) SCO	Bowden	1	0	1	0	0	0
	FW	(Scotland) SCO	David Collins	24	3	22	3	2	0
	FW	(Scotland) SCO	David Cowan	2	1	2	1	0	0
	FW	(Scotland) SCO	Willie Dunn	18	7	15	4	3	3
	FW	(Scotland) SCO	John Getty	5	0	5	0	0	0
	FW	(Scotland) SCO	John Lang	14	4	11	2	3	2
	FW	(Scotland) SCO	John McBride	1	0	1	0	0	0
	FW	(Scotland) SCO	Willie Mills	7	4	7	4	0	0
	FW	(Scotland) SCO	Jackie Milne	15	6	14	5	1	1
	FW	(Scotland) SCO	William Nichol	27	2	24	2	3	0
	FW	(Scotland) SCO	James Shields	6	5	6	5	0	0
	FW	(Scotland) SCO	Smith	1	0	1	0	0	0
	FW	(Scotland) SCO	Bobby Speedie	19	4	17	4	2	0
	FW	(Scotland) SCO	Alex Stewart	11	7	11	7	0	0

=== Transfers ===
==== Players in ====
Player	From	Date
(Scotland) David Cowan	(Scotland) Arbroath	1 May 1939
(Scotland) William Nichol	(Scotland) Stenhousemuir	17 May 1939
(Scotland) James Brown	(Scotland) Motherwell	3 Jun 1939
(Scotland) David McLean	(Scotland) Third Lanark	3 Jun 1939
(Scotland) John Getty	(England) Nottingham Forest	4 Jul 1939
(Scotland) Johnny Soutar	(Scotland) Montrose (guest)	21 Oct 1939
(Scotland) Duncan Yuill	(England) Millwall (guest)	21 Oct 1939
(Scotland) Stephen Murray	(Scotland) Dunfermline Athletic (guest)	26 Oct 1939
(Scotland) Willie Mills	(England) Huddersfield Town (guest)	1 Nov 1939
(Scotland) Jackie Milne	(England) Middlesbrough (guest)	3 Nov 1939
(Scotland) Robert Fraser	(Scotland) Hibernian (guest)	6 Nov 1939
(Scotland) Willie Steel	(England) Derby County (guest)	15 Nov 1939
(Scotland) Willie Dunn	(Scotland) Raith Rovers (guest)	30 Nov 1939
(Scotland) David Collins	(Scotland) Morton (guest)	7 Dec 1939
(Scotland) Kenneth Stewart	(Scotland) Cowdenbeath (guest)	17 Feb 1940
(Scotland) Fulton Wilson	(Scotland) St Mirren (guest)	29 Feb 1940
(Scotland) Alex Stewart	(Scotland) Falkirk (guest)	23 Mar 1940
(Scotland) John Hill	(Scotland) Cowdenbeath (guest)	15 Apr 1940
(Scotland) James Shields	(Scotland) Celtic (guest)	22 Apr 1940
(Scotland) John Lang	(England) Barnsley (guest)	
(Scotland) John Mathers	(Scotland) St Johnstone (guest)	
(Scotland) John Browning	(England) Gillingham (guest)	

==== Players out ====
Player	To	Date
(Scotland) Robert Speedie	(Scotland) Stenhousemuir	9 Aug 1939
(Scotland) William Morrison	(Scotland) Released	17 Nov 1939
(Scotland) Thomas Bilsland	(Scotland) Third Lanark	
(Scotland) Jimmy Smith	(Scotland) Manager Dumbarton F.C.	

In addition Walter Bulloch, William Cameron, John Craig, Andrew Cumming, Alistair MacKillop, James McAllister, Patrick McArdle, William Monaghan, John Smith and John Yuill all played their last games in Dumbarton 'colours'.
