= 1939–40 Rangers F.C. season =

Rangers
1939–40 season
- Chairman: James Bowie
- Manager: Bill Struth
- Ground: Ibrox Park
- Scottish League Division One: 1st (cancelled); P5 W4 D1 L0 F14 A3 Pts9
- Emergency League Western Division: Winners
- Emergency War Cup: 1st P30 W22 D4 L4 F72 A36 Pts48
- Top goalscorer: League: Willie Thornton (5); All: Willie Thornton (5)

The 1939–40 season was the 66th season of competitive football by Rangers, although with the outbreak of the Second World War, the competitive season was abandoned.

== Overview ==
With the outbreak of the War on 3 September 1939, the season was suspended after five rounds of games played in the Scottish League Division One. The league was not officially competed for until season 1946–47 but there were unofficial regional leagues played during these years. This saw the club play what was known as wartime football.

Rangers played a total of five official competitive matches during the 1939–40 season.

== Results ==
All results are written with Rangers' score first.

=== Scottish League Division One ===
Date	Opponent	Venue	Result	Attendance	Scorers
12 August 1939	St Mirren	H	5–1	35,000	Venters (2, 1 pen.), Thornton, Woodburn, Fiddes
19 August 1939	Ayr United	A	4–0	20,000	Thornton (2), Waddell, Venters
22 August 1939	St Mirren	A	0–0	25,000	
26 August 1939	Arbroath	H	3–1	15,000	Waddell, Thornton, Venters
2 September 1939	Third Lanark	A	2–1	30,000	Thornton, Gilmour

=== Emergency Western League ===
Date	Opponent	Venue	Result	Attendance	Scorers
21 October 1939	Motherwell	A	1-0		
28 October 1939	Third Lanark	H	6-0		
11 November 1939	St Mirren	H	4-0		
18 November 1939	Airdrieonians	A	1-0		
25 November 1939	Dumbarton	H	2-1		
2 December 1939	Kilmarnock	H	4-1		
9 December 1939	Clyde	A	1-0		
16 December 1939	Albion Rovers	H	2-1		
23 December 1939	Hamilton Academical	A	0-2		
30 December 1939	Morton	A	0-3		
1 January 1940	Celtic	H	1-1		
6 January 1940	Queen's Park	H	4-0		
13 January 1940	Queen of the South	A	2-1		
20 January 1940	Motherwell	H	1-2		
10 February 1940	St Mirren	A	6-4		
17 February 1940	Airdrieonians	H	3-1		
16 March 1940	Albion Rovers	A	3-3		
25 March 1940	Partick Thistle	H	2-2		
30 March 1940	Morton	H	1-0		
6 April 1940	Celtic	A	2-1		
17 April 1940	Ayr United	H	3-1		
20 April 1940	Queen's Park	A	3-2		
22 April 1940	Third Lanark	A	1-0		
24 April 1940	Dumbarton	A	3-2		
27 April 1940	Queen of the South	H	5-1		
8 May 1940	Clyde	H	3-1		
15 May 1940	Kilmarnock	A	1-3		
18 May 1940	Hamilton Academical	H	2-2		
25 May 1940	Partck Thistle	A	3-1		

=== Emergency War Cup ===
Date	Round	Opponent	Venue	Result	Attendance	Scorers
24 February 1940	R1 L1	Alloa Athletic	A	4–1	7,000	
2 March 1940	R1 L2	Alloa Athletic	H	2–2	8,000	
9 March 1940	R2 L1	Falkirk	A	0–0	16,000	
11 March 1940	R2 L2	Falkirk	H	3–2	46,000	
23 March 1940	QF	St Mirren	H	3–1	60,000	
13 April 1940	SF	Motherwell	N	4–1	50,000	
4 May 1940	F	Dundee United	N	1–0	75,000	Smith

=== Play off final between West and East Divisions ===
Date	Round	Opponent	Venue	Result	Attendance	Scorers
1 June 1940	PO	Falkirk	H	2–1		

== Official appearances ==
(declared void along with fixtures)

Player	Position	Appearances	Goals
(Scotland) Jerry Dawson	GK	5	0
(Scotland) Dougie Gray	DF	5	0
(Scotland) Bobby Bolt	DF	5	0
(Scotland) William Waddell	MF	5	2
(Scotland) Scot Symon	MF	5	0
(Scotland) Willie Thornton	FW	5	5
(Scotland) Alex Venters	FW	5	4
(Scotland) Jock Shaw	DF	4	0
(Scotland) Willie Woodburn	DF	4	1
(Scotland) Chris McNee	MF	4	0
(Scotland) Jim Fiddes	MF	3	1
(Scotland) Thomas Gilmour	MF	1	1
(Scotland) David Kinnear	MF	1	0
(Scotland) Jimmy Simpson	DF	1	0
(Scotland) Ralph Cowan	DF	1	0
(Scotland) Ian McPherson	MF	1	0

== See also ==
- 1939–40 in Scottish football
