= 1939–40 Dundee United F.C. season =

Dundee United
1939–40 season
- Manager: Bobby McKay (to September); Jimmy Allan (from September)
- Stadium: Tannadice Park
- Emergency League Eastern Division: 9th W12 D2 L15 F68 A77 P26
- Scottish War Emergency Cup: Finalists

The 1939–40 season was the 31st year of football played by Dundee United, and covers the period from 1 July 1939 to 30 June 1940.

== Match results ==
Dundee United played a total of 36 unofficial matches during the 1939–40 season.

=== Legend ===
Win
Draw
Loss

All results are written with Dundee United's score first. Own goals in italics

=== Second Division ===
Date	Opponent	Venue	Result	Attendance	Scorers
12 August 1939	Edinburgh City	A	2-3		
19 August 1939	Stenhousemuir	H	4-2		
26 August 1939	East Stirlingshire	A	1-1		
2 September 1939	Leith Athletic	H	0-2		

League suspended due to World War II.

=== Emergency War League Eastern Division ===
Date	Opponent	Venue	Result	Attendance	Scorers
21 October 1939	Stenhousemuir	A	0-1		
28 October 1939	King's Park	H	1-0		
4 November 1939	Cowdenbeath	A	4-2		
11 November 1939	St Johnstone	H	2-2		
18 November 1939	Heart of Midlothian	A	2-9	3,715	
25 November 1939	Aberdeen	H	3-5		
2 December 1939	Dunfermline Athletic	H	5-2		
9 December 1939	Hibernian	A	2-6		
16 December 1939	St Bernard's	A	2-4		
23 December 1939	Raith Rovers	H	1-1		
30 December 1939	Alloa Athletic	A	1-2		
1 January 1940	Dundee	H	2-1		
2 January 1940	East Fife	A	6-3		
6 January 1940	Arbroath	H	4-2		
13 January 1940	Falkirk	A	2-4		
10 February 1940	St Johnstone	A	3-1		
17 February 1940	Heart of Midlothian	H	3-2		
16 March 1940	St Bernard's	H	1-0		
30 March 1940	Alloa Athletic	H	5-0		
3 April 1940	Stenhousemuir	H	10-2		
6 April 1940	Dundee	A	1-2		
8 April 1940	King's Park	A	1-2		
24 April 1940	Aberdeen	A	1-3		
26 April 1940	Arbroath	A	2-5		
27 April 1940	Falkirk	H	1-3		
8 May 1940	Raith Rovers	A	0-5		
11 May 1940	Hibernian	H	1-3		
18 May 1940	Dunfermline Athletic	A	0-2		
25 May 1940	East Fife	H	3-2		

=== Scottish War Emergency Cup ===
Date	Rd	Opponent	Venue	Result	Attendance	Scorers
24 February 1940	R1 L1	Partick Thistle	A	4-2	5,210	
2 March 1940	R1 L2	Partick Thistle	H	1-1	8,000	
9 March 1940	R2	Third Lanark	H	7-1	8,000	
23 March 1940	R3	Kilmarnock	H	3-0	14,000	
13 April 1940	SF	Airdrieonians	N	0-0	22,655	
17 April 1940	SF R	Airdrieonians	H	3-1	20,200	
4 May 1940	F	Rangers	N	0-1	75,000	
