= 1939–40 Heart of Midlothian F.C. season =

Heart of Midlothian
1939–40 season
- Manager: Frank Moss
- Stadium: Tynecastle Park
- Emergency League Eastern Division: 3rd
- Emergency Cup: Quarter-final

During the 1939–40 season and after the outbreak of World War II which suspended the usual Scottish Football League, Hearts competed in the Emergency League Eastern Division, the Emergency Cup and the East of Scotland Shield.

== Fixtures ==
=== Friendlies ===
2 August 1939 Trail	Hearts	7–0	Hearts "A"	Tynecastle Park

7 August 1939 Trail	Hearts	5–0	Hearts "A"	Tynecastle Park

23 September 1939 Friendly	Hearts	2–4	Hibernian	Tynecastle Park

7 October 1939 Friendly	Hearts	4–2	Partick Thistle	Tynecastle Park

14 October 1939 Friendly	Hearts	5–2	Celtic	Tynecastle Park

=== Wilson Cup ===
16 August 1939 Final	Hibernian	0–2	Hearts	Easter Road
	Goal

=== East of Scotland Shield ===
30 August 1939 Semi-Final	Hearts	7–0	Leith Athletic	Tynecastle Park

15 May 1940 Final	Hibernian	3–2	Hearts	Easter Road

=== Rosebery Charity Cup ===
22 May 1940 Semi-Final	Hearts	3–1	Leith Athletic	Tynecastle Park
	Goal

1 June 1940 Final	Hearts	2–5	Hibernian	Tynecastle Park
	Goal

=== Scottish First Division (abandoned) ===
12 August 1939 Scottish First Division	Hearts	1–1	Partick Thistle	Tynecastle Park

19 August 1939 Scottish First Division	Celtic	2–0	Hearts	Celtic Park

22 August 1939 Scottish First Division	Partick Thistle	1–2	Hearts	Tynecastle Park

26 August 1939 Scottish First Division	Hearts	6–2	Ayr United	Tynecastle Park

2 September 1939 Scottish First Division	Motherwell	2–4	Hearts	Fir Park

=== Emergency Cup ===
24 February 1940 Emergency Cup R1 1st Leg	St Johnstone	2–1	Hearts	Muirton Park
				Attendance: 4,300

2 March 1940 Emergency Cup R1 2nd Leg	Hearts	5–0	St Johnstone	Tynecastle Park
				Attendance: 7,974

9 March 1940 Emergency Cup R2	Hearts	2–1	Raith Rovers	Tynecastle Park
				Attendance: 9,951

23 March 1940 Emergency Cup Quarter-Final 1st Leg	Airdrieonians	0–0	Hearts	Broomfield Park
				Attendance: 14,000

27 March 1940 Emergency Cup Quarter-Final 2nd Leg	Hearts	2–2	Airdrieonians	Tynecastle Park
				Attendance: 19,949

1 April 1940 Emergency Cup Quarter-Final Replay	Hearts	3–4	Airdrieonians	Tynecastle Park
				Attendance: 20,000

=== Emergency League Eastern Division ===
21 October 1939 Emergency League Eastern Division	Hearts	2–3	Falkirk	Tynecastle Park
				Attendance: 4,500

28 October 1939 Emergency League Eastern Division	Raith Rovers	1–5	Hearts	Stark's Park

4 November 1939 Emergency League Eastern Division	Hearts	2–2	St Bernard's	Tynecastle Park

11 November 1939 Emergency League Eastern Division	Alloa Athletic	2–3	Hearts	Recreation Park

18 November 1939 Emergency League Eastern Division	Hearts	9–2	Dundee United	Tynecastle Park
				Attendance: 3,715

25 November 1939 Emergency League Eastern Division	Dunfermline Athletic	5–2	Hearts	East End Park

2 December 1939 Emergency League Eastern Division	Hearts	6–3	East Fife	Tynecastle Park

9 December 1939 Emergency League Eastern Division	Dundee	4–6	Hearts	Dens Park

16 December 1939 Emergency League Eastern Division	Hearts	3–2	Aberdeen	Tynecastle Park
				Attendance: 4,000

23 December 1939 Emergency League Eastern Division	Cowdenbeath	1–1	Hearts	Central Park

30 December 1939 Emergency League Eastern Division	Hearts	8–2	Stenhousemuir	Tynecastle Park

1 January 1940 Emergency League Eastern Division	Hibernian	4–6	Hearts	Easter Road
				Attendance: 14,000

2 January 1940 Emergency League Eastern Division	Hearts	7–2	Arbroath	Tynecastle Park

6 January 1940 Emergency League Eastern Division	King's Park	2–2	Hearts	Forthbank Park

13 January 1940 Emergency League Eastern Division	Hearts	3–0	St Johnstone	Tynecastle Park

10 February 1940 Emergency League Eastern Division	Hearts	7–2	Alloa Athletic	Tynecastle Park
				Attendance: 5,000

17 February 1940 Emergency League Eastern Division	Dundee United	3–2	Hearts	Tannadice Park
				Attendance: 3,000

16 March 1940 Emergency League Eastern Division	Aberdeen	3–0	Hearts	Pittodrie Park

30 March 1940 Emergency League Eastern Division	Stenhousemuir	1–0	Hearts	Ochilview Park

3 April 1940 Emergency League Eastern Division	Falkirk	7–1	Hearts	Brockville Park
				Attendance: 5,000

6 April 1940 Emergency League Eastern Division	Hearts	4–0	Hibernian	Tynecastle Park

10 April 1940 Emergency League Eastern Division	Hearts	4–3	Raith Rovers	Tynecastle Park

13 April 1940 Emergency League Eastern Division	Arbroath	2–2	Hearts	Gayfield Park

15 April 1940 Emergency League Eastern Division	St Bernard's	0–2	Hearts	Tynecastle Park

20 April 1940 Emergency League Eastern Division	Hearts	7–2	King's Park	Tynecastle Park

27 April 1940 Emergency League Eastern Division	St Johnstone	2–2	Hearts	Muirton Park

4 May 1940 Emergency League Eastern Division	East Fife	1–2	Hearts	Bayview Park

11 May 1940 Emergency League Eastern Division	Hearts	2–3	Dundee	Tynecastle Park

25 May 1940 Emergency League Eastern Division	Hearts	2–0	Dunfermline Athletic	Tynecastle Park

== See also ==
- List of Heart of Midlothian F.C. seasons
