= 1940–41 Heart of Midlothian F.C. season =

Heart of Midlothian
1940–41 season
- Manager: Frank Moss
- Stadium: Tynecastle Park
- Southern League: 9th
- Summer Cup: Semi-finalists
- Southern League Cup: Finalists

During the 1940–41 season Hearts competed in the Southern League, the Summer Cup, the Southern League Cup and the East of Scotland Shield.

== Fixtures ==
=== Wilson Cup ===
14 August 1940 Final	Hearts	3–2	Hibernian	Tynecastle Park
	Goal

=== Rosebery Charity Cup ===
31 May 1941 Final	Hibernian	0–2	Hearts	Easter Road
	Goal

=== Southern League Cup ===
1 March 1941 Southern League Cup Group	Hearts	3–0	Queen's Park	Tynecastle Park

8 March 1941 Southern League Cup Group	Hibernian	3–2	Hearts	Easter Road

15 March 1941 Southern League Cup Group	Hearts	3–1	Clyde	Tynecastle Park

22 March 1941 Southern League Cup Group	Queen's Park	0–1	Hearts	Hampden Park

29 March 1941 Southern League Cup Group	Hearts	5–2	Hibernian	Tynecastle Park

5 April 1941 Southern League Cup Group	Rangers	1–0	Clyde	Shawfield Stadium

19 April 1941 Southern League Cup Semi-Final	Hearts	2–0	Celtic	Tynecastle Park
				Attendance: 25,000

10 May 1941 Southern League Cup Final 1st Leg	Hearts	1–1	Rangers	Hampden Park
				Attendance: 69,000

17 May 1941 Southern League Cup Final 2nd Leg	Rangers	4–2	Hearts	Hampden Park
				Attendance: 90,428

=== Summer Cup ===
7 June 1941 Summer Cup R1 1st Leg	Hearts	8–1	Queen's Park	Tynecastle Park

14 June 1941 Summer Cup R1 2nd Leg	Queen's Park	3–1	Hearts	Hampden Park

21 June 1941 Summer Cup R2 1st Leg	Hearts	3–2	St Mirren	Tynecastle Park

28 June 1941 Summer Cup R2 2nd Leg	St Mirren	1–5	Hearts	St Mirren Park, Love Street

5 July 1941 Summer Cup Semi-Final	Rangers	4–2	Hearts	Hampden Park

=== Southern League ===
10 August 1940 Southern League	Motherwell	3–0	Hearts	Fir Park

17 August 1940 Southern League	Hearts	2–3	Falkirk	Tynecastle Park
				Attendance: 12,000

24 August 1940 Southern League	Celtic	2–1	Hearts	Celtic Park
				Attendance: 15,000

31 August 1940 Southern League	Hearts	0–2	Airdrieonians	Tynecastle Park

7 September 1940 Southern League	Hibernian	2–1	Hearts	Easter Road

14 September 1940 Southern League	Hearts	4–2	Third Lanark	Tynecastle Park
				Attendance: 6,000

21 September 1940 Southern League	Partick Thistle	4–2	Hearts	Firhill Park

28 September 1940 Southern League	Hearts	5–1	St Mirren	Tynecastle Park

5 October 1940 Southern League	Queen's Park	3–1	Hearts	Hampden Park
				Attendance: 4,000

12 October 1940 Southern League	Hearts	1–1	Rangers	Tynecastle Park

19 October 1940 Southern League	Clyde	10–3	Hearts	Tynecastle Park
				Attendance: 4,000

26 October 1940 Southern League	Hearts	3–3	Morton	Tynecastle Park

2 November 1940 Southern League	Hamilton Academical	1–2	Hearts	Douglas Park

9 November 1940 Southern League	Dumbarton	1–4	Hearts	Boghead Park

16 November 1940 Southern League	Hearts	3–1	Albion Rovers	Tynecastle Park

23 November 1940 Southern League	Hearts	1–1	Motherwell	Tynecastle Park

30 November 1940 Southern League	Falkirk	3–3	Hearts	Brockville Park

7 December 1940 Southern League	Hearts	2–1	Celtic	Tynecastle Park

14 December 1940 Southern League	Airdrieonians	3–1	Hearts	Broomfield Park

21 December 1940 Southern League	Hearts	2–1	Partick Thistle	Tynecastle Park

28 December 1940 Southern League	Third Lanark	2–0	Hearts	Cathkin Park

4 January 1941 Southern League	St Mirren	0–1	Hearts	St Mirren Park, Love Street

18 January 1941 Southern League	Rangers	3–0	Hearts	Ibrox Park

25 January 1941 Southern League	Hearts	3–5	Clyde	Tynecastle Park

1 February 1941 Southern League	Morton	1–1	Hearts	Cappielow Park

8 February 1941 Southern League	Hearts	5–2	Hamilton Academical	Tynecastle Park

15 February 1941 Southern League	Hearts	3–1	Dumbarton	Tynecastle Park
				Attendance: 3,000

12 April 1941 Southern League	Albion Rovers	0–3	Hearts	Cliftonhill

28 April 1941 Southern League	Hearts	6–2	Hibernian	Tynecastle Park
				Attendance: 3,004

3 May 1941 Southern League	Hearts	1–0	Queen's Park	Tynecastle Park

== See also ==
- List of Heart of Midlothian F.C. seasons
