= 1939–40 Hibernian F.C. season =

Hibernian
1939–40 season
- Manager: Willie McCartney
- Scottish First Division: League suspended due to World War II
- Scottish Emergency League Eastern Division: 8th
- Emergency War Cup: R1
- Highest home attendance: No Attendances Available
- Lowest home attendance: No Attendances Available
- Average home league attendance: No Attendances Available (league suspended)

== Scottish First Division ==
Round	Date	Opponent	H/A	Score	Hibernian Scorer(s)	Attendance
1	12 August	Queen of the South	A	1–2		
2	19 August	Clyde	H	3–2		
3	23 August	Queen of the South	H	3–1		
4	26 August	Aberdeen	A	1–3		
5	2 September	Albion Rovers	H	3–5		

=== Eastern Division ===
Match Day	Date	Opponent	H/A	Score	Hibernian Scorer(s)	Attendance
1	21 October	Dundee	A	1–2		
2	28 October	St Johnstone	H	3–3		
3	4 November	Aberdeen	A	3–3		
4	11 November	Stenhousemuir	H	1–2		
5	18 November	King's Park	A	7–2		
6	25 November	East Fife	H	2–5		
7	2 December	Falkirk	A	3–3		
8	9 December	Dundee United	H	6–2		
9	16 December	Arbroath	A	0–0		
10	23 December	Alloa Athletic	H	3–0		
11	30 December	St Bernard's	A	6–1		
12	1 January	Heart of Midlothian	H	5–6		14,000
13	2 January	Cowdenbeath	A	4–0		
14	6 January	Raith Rovers	H	4–1		
14	13 January	Dunfermline Athletic	A	1–2		
15	17 February	King's Park	H	2–1		
17	16 March	Arbroath	H	2–4		
18	23 March	Alloa Athletic	A	3–2		
19	27 March	Stenhousemuir	A	1–2		
20	30 March	St Bernard's	H	3–1		
21	3 April	Dundee	H	6–0		
22	6 April	Heart of Midlothian	A	0–4		
23	10 April	St Johnstone	H	0–4		
24	13 April	East Fife	A	3–4		
25	20 April	Raith Rovers	A	1–1		
26	27 April	Dunfermline Athletic	H	2–3		
27	4 May	Falkirk	H	5–6		
28	11 May	Dundee United	A	3–1		
29	18 May	Aberdeen	H	2–0		

=== Final League table ===
P	Team	Pld	W	D	L	GF	GA	GD	Pts
7	Dundee	29	11	8	10	70	62	8	30
8	Hibernian	29	12	5	12	82	65	17	29
9	Dundee United	29	12	2	15	68	77	−9	26

=== Emergency War Cup ===
Round	Date	Opponent	H/A	Score	Hibernian Scorer(s)	Attendance
R1 L1	24 February	Falkirk	A	0–5		
R1 L2	2 March	Falkirk	H	4–0		

== See also ==
- List of Hibernian F.C. seasons
