= Dornan =

Dornan is a surname. Notable people with the surname include:

- Alan Dornan (born 1962), Northern Irish footballer and manager
- Andy Dornan (born 1961), Scottish footballer
- Bob Dornan (born 1933), American politician
- Dimity Dornan, Australian speech pathologist, author, and businesswoman
- Henry Dornan (1916–1990), Scottish footballer
- James Dornan (born 1953), Scottish politician
- Jamie Dornan (born 1982), Northern Irish actor, model, and musician
- Jim Dornan (born 1948), Northern Irish obstetrician, gynecologist, and professor
- John Dornan (cricketer) (1880–1959), American cricketer
- Peter Dornan (born 1939), British physicist and professor
- Tim Dornan (born 1950), British physician, endocrinologist, and medical educationalist
- William Dornan (c. 1895–1937), Scottish footballer
