= 1940–41 Celtic F.C. season =

Celtic
1940–41 season
- Manager: Jimmy McStay
- Stadium: Celtic Park
- Southern League: 5th
- Summer Cup: First round
- Southern League Cup: Semi-finalists

During the 1940–41 Scottish football season, Celtic competed in the Southern Football League.

== Competitions ==
=== Southern Football League ===
==== League table ====
Pos	Team	Pld	W	D	L	GF	GA	GD	Pts
1	Rangers (C)	30	21	4	5	79	33	+46	46
2	Clyde	30	18	7	5	99	61	+38	43
3	Hibernian	30	14	7	9	74	61	+13	35
4	Airdrieonians	30	13	8	9	75	62	+13	34
5	Celtic	30	14	6	10	48	40	+8	34
6	Falkirk	30	13	7	10	78	73	+5	33
7	St Mirren	30	12	8	10	55	57	−2	32
8	Motherwell	30	13	4	13	73	65	+8	30
9	Heart of Midlothian	30	12	5	13	64	71	−7	29
10	Morton	30	9	11	10	67	62	+5	29
11	Hamilton Academical	30	11	6	13	67	75	−8	28
12	Partick Thistle	30	9	8	13	55	62	−7	26
13	Third Lanark	30	9	7	14	56	80	−24	25
14	Dumbarton	30	10	4	16	58	78	−20	24
15	Albion Rovers	30	6	5	19	45	80	−35	17
16	Queen's Park	30	6	3	21	46	79	−33	15

Source: Scottish Football History – Southern Football League
Rules for classification: 1) points; 2) goal difference; 3) number of goals scored.
(C) Champions

==== Matches ====
10 August 1940 Southern League	Celtic	2–2	Hamilton Academical	Glasgow
				Stadium: Celtic Park

17 August 1940 Southern League	Morton	2–0	Celtic	Greenock
				Stadium: Cappielow Park

24 August 1940 Southern League	Celtic	2–1	Hearts	Glasgow
				Stadium: Celtic Park; Attendance: 15,000

31 August 1940 Southern League	Albion Rovers	1–3	Celtic	Coatbridge
				Stadium: Cliftonhill

7 September 1940 Southern League	Celtic	0–0	Rangers	Glasgow
				Stadium: Celtic Park

14 September 1940 Southern League	Queen's Park	0–1	Celtic	Glasgow
				Stadium: Hampden Park

21 September 1940 Southern League	Celtic	1–0	Dumbarton	Glasgow
				Stadium: Celtic Park

5 October 1940 Southern League	Airdrieonians	1–0	Celtic	Airdrie
				Stadium: Broomfield Park

12 October 1940 Southern League	Celtic	2–2	Falkirk	Glasgow
				Stadium: Celtic Park

19 October 1940 Southern League	Motherwell	5–1	Celtic	Motherwell
				Stadium: Fir Park

26 October 1940 Southern League	Celtic	0–4	Hibernian	Glasgow
				Stadium: Celtic Park

2 November 1940 Southern League	Partick Thistle	1–1	Celtic	Glasgow
Abandoned 60mins				Stadium: Firhill Park

9 November 1940 Southern League	Celtic	0–0	St Mirren	Glasgow
				Stadium: Celtic Park

16 November 1940 Southern League	Third Lanark	1–0	Celtic	Glasgow
				Stadium: Cathkin Park

23 November 1940 Southern League	Hamilton Academical	1–0	Celtic	Hamilton
				Stadium: Douglas Park

30 November 1940 Southern League	Celtic	2–0	Morton	Glasgow
				Stadium: Celtic Park

7 December 1940 Southern League	Hearts	2–1	Celtic	Edinburgh
				Stadium: Tynecastle Park

14 December 1940 Southern League	Celtic	2–0	Albion Rovers	Glasgow
				Stadium: Celtic Park

21 December 1940 Southern League	Dumbarton	2–3	Celtic	Dumbarton
				Stadium: Boghead Park

28 December 1940 Southern League	Celtic	5–1	Queen's Park	Glasgow
				Stadium: Celtic Park

1 January 1941 Southern League	Rangers	2–3	Celtic	Glasgow
				Stadium: Ibrox Park

4 January 1941 Southern League	Clyde	1–1	Celtic	Glasgow
				Stadium: Shawfield Stadium

11 January 1941 Southern League	Celtic	2–0	Airdrieonians	Glasgow
				Stadium: Celtic Park

18 January 1941 Southern League	Falkirk	0–1	Celtic	Falkirk
				Stadium: Brockville Park

25 January 1941 Southern League	Celtic	4–1	Motherwell	Glasgow
				Stadium: Celtic Park

1 February 1941 Southern League	Hibernian	2–0	Celtic	Edinburgh
				Stadium: Easter Road

8 February 1941 Southern League	Celtic	5–1	Partick Thistle	Glasgow
				Stadium: Celtic Park

15 February 1941 Southern League	St Mirren	1–0	Celtic	Paisley
				Stadium: St Mirren Park, Love Street

22 February 1941 Southern League	Celtic	4–3	Third Lanark	Glasgow
				Stadium: Celtic Park

12 April 1941 Southern League	Celtic	1–1	Clyde	Glasgow
				Stadium: Celtic Park

26 April 1941 Southern League	Partick Thistle	3–2	Celtic	Glasgow
				Stadium: Firhill Park

=== Summer Cup ===
7 June 1941 First round first leg	Celtic	2–5	Hibernian	Glasgow
				Stadium: Celtic Park

14 June 1941 First round second leg	Hibernian	0–1	Celtic	Edinburgh
				Stadium: Easter Road

=== Southern League Cup ===
1 March 1941 Group	Airdrieonians	1–2	Celtic	Airdrie
				Stadium: Broomfield Park

8 March 1941 Group	Celtic	3–2	Motherwell	Glasgow
				Stadium: Celtic Park

15 March 1941 Group	Celtic	2–4	Partick Thistle	Glasgow
				Stadium: Celtic Park

22 March 1941 Group	Celtic	3–1	Airdrieonians	Glasgow
				Stadium: Celtic Park

29 March 1941 Group	Motherwell	4–2	Celtic	Motherwell
				Stadium: Fir Park

5 April 1941 Group	Partick Thistle	0–1	Celtic	Glasgow
				Stadium: Firhill Park

19 April 1941 Semi-final	Hearts	2–0	Celtic	Edinburgh
				Stadium: Easter Road
