= John Drysdale =

John Drysdale may refer to:

- John Drysdale (politician) (1926–1996), member of the House of Commons of Canada
- John Drysdale (cricketer) (1862–1923), Australian cricketer
- John Drysdale (footballer) (1913–1965), Scottish footballer
- John Drysdale (moderator) (1718–1788), twice Moderator of the General Assembly of the Church of Scotland
- John Drysdale (historian) (1925–2016), British-born army officer, diplomat and historian
