= Bobby Gardiner (footballer) =

Scottish footballer

Robert Gardiner (born 2 September 1912, date of death unknown) was a Scottish footballer who played as an inside forward for clubs including Dundee United, Bristol Rovers and Valenciennes.

== Playing career ==
Born in Dundee, Gardiner began his career in local junior football with Broughty Ex-Servicemen. He played for Dundee United as a trialist in December 1933, scoring two goals in a 4–4 draw with Arbroath, and was subsequently signed by the club. The following season, he was joined in the United attack by Arthur Milne. Their successful partnership and diminutive stature led to the pair being nicknamed the "Mighty Midgets".

Declining the club's offer of a new contract at the end of the 1935–36 season, Gardiner then went to play for a season in English non-League football with Dartford. As Dundee United still retained his registration, they received a transfer fee of £250 when he then signed for Football League club Bristol Rovers in 1937. Shortly after the outbreak of the Second World War in 1939, Gardiner returned to Dundee United as a guest player, and was soon joined by Milne in similar circumstances. The pair helped the club reach the Scottish War Emergency Cup final in 1940. He subsequently appeared in local junior football before guesting for Dundee United again up until 1943, when he returned to Bristol Rovers. He ended his senior career with Arbroath, and also had a spell with French club Valenciennes in 1946.
