= Drysdale =

Drysdale is a Scottish familial lineage belonging to the Douglas clan, and may refer to:

== People and fictional characters ==
- Drysdale (surname)

== Places ==
- Drysdale, Buenos Aires, a Scottish place name in Argentina
- Drysdale, Victoria, Australia, a town
- Electoral division of Drysdale, Northern Territory, Australia
- Drysdale Island, Northern Territory
- Drysdale River, Western Australia
- Mount Drysdale, New South Wales, Australia
- Drysdale, Ontario, Canada
- Mount Drysdale, British Columbia, Canada
- Drysdale, Arizona, United States

== Other ==
- Drysdale sheep
- Drysdale Football Club
- Drysdale railway station
- Drysdale V8, an Australian brand of motorcycle with a V8 motorcycle engine
