= 1939–40 Scottish War Emergency League =

Football league set up during World War II

The Scottish War Emergency League was a football league competition set up in the 1939–40 season of Scottish football, after the usual official competitions were suspended due to the outbreak of World War II.

The Scottish Football League officially suspended its competition on 13 September 1939 and set up a committee to investigate the possibility of regional league competitions. These were rubber-stamped on 26 September after the Home Secretary had granted permission, they commenced a month later. There were two divisions; eastern and western; each consisting of 16 clubs. This left out six of the previous league clubs; Montrose, Brechin City, Forfar Athletic, Leith Athletic, Edinburgh City and East Stirlingshire.

Cowdenbeath resigned halfway through the season, they had played all the other clubs once and so their record was allowed to stand. The competition was completed by a play-off between the two divisional winners, who were Rangers and Falkirk; Rangers won 2–1 at Hampden Park.

For the following season, competitions were organised separately in different parts of the country: the Southern Football League and the North Eastern Football League, which lasted until the resumption of official competitions in 1946 (although the Southern League 'absorbed' the North Eastern League in the 1945–46 season).

== Western division ==
Pos	Team	Pld	W	D	L	GF	GA	GD	Pts
1	Rangers	30	22	4	4	72	36	+36	48
2	Queen of the South	30	17	6	7	77	55	+22	40
3	Hamilton Academical	30	15	8	7	78	55	+23	38
4	Motherwell	30	15	8	7	64	56	+8	38
5	Morton	30	14	5	11	64	46	+18	33
6	Albion Rovers	30	15	2	13	62	60	+2	32
7	Clyde	30	11	9	10	68	51	+17	31
8	Kilmarnock	30	13	5	12	63	63	0	31
9	Airdrieonians	30	14	2	14	63	61	+2	30
10	St Mirren	30	11	4	15	59	66	−7	26
11	Partick Thistle	30	10	6	14	57	74	−17	26
12	Third Lanark	30	10	5	15	53	78	−25	25
13	Celtic	30	9	6	15	55	61	−6	24
14	Queen's Park	30	7	7	16	55	82	−27	21
15	Ayr United	30	7	5	18	50	66	−16	19
16	Dumbarton	30	7	4	19	48	78	−30	18

== Eastern division ==
Pos	Team	Pld	W	D	L	GF	GA	GD	Pts
1	Falkirk	29	20	5	4	106	47	+59	45
2	Dunfermline Athletic	29	19	2	8	80	55	+25	40
3	Heart of Midlothian	29	18	4	7	104	66	+38	40
4	Aberdeen	29	16	4	9	86	50	+36	36
5	St Johnstone	29	13	8	8	84	69	+15	34
6	Alloa Athletic	29	13	4	12	56	60	−4	30
7	Dundee	29	11	8	10	70	62	+8	30
8	Hibernian	29	12	5	12	82	65	+17	29
9	Dundee United	29	12	2	15	68	77	−9	26
10	East Fife	29	11	3	15	80	91	−11	25
11	Raith Rovers	29	10	3	16	69	85	−16	23
12	King's Park	29	9	4	16	62	88	−26	22
13	St Bernard's	29	8	5	16	44	77	−33	21
14	Arbroath	29	6	5	18	44	91	−47	17
15	Stenhousemuir	29	7	3	19	52	98	−46	17
16	Cowdenbeath	15	7	1	7	38	44	−6	15

== Play-off ==
1 June 1940

Rangers	2–1	Falkirk
Venters 25'; Little 84'		Napier 60'

Ibrox Park, Glasgow
Attendance: 15,000
Referee: P. Craigmyle

=== Teams ===
Falkirk:
GK	Gibby McKie
RB	Jim McPhie
LB	Alex Peat
RH	Archie Miller
CH	Bob Shankly
LH	Hugh Murray
OR	Bobby Keyes
IR	Willie Miller
CF	David McCulloch
IL	Charlie Napier
OL	Kenny Dawson

Rangers:
GK	Jerry Dawson
RB	Dougie Gray
LB	Jock Shaw
RH	Tom McKillop
CH	Willie Woodburn
LH	Scot Symon
OR	Willie Waddell
IR	Ian McPherson
CF	Jimmy Smith
IL	Alex Venters
OL	Adam Little
