= Jock Venters =

Scottish footballer

Personal information
- Full name: John Cook Venters
- Date of birth: 22 August 1910
- Place of birth: Cowdenbeath, Scotland
- Date of death: 1978 (aged 67–68)
- Place of death: Cowdenbeath, Scotland
- Position: Inside right

Senior career*
Years	Team	Apps	(Gls)
- Lochore Thistle
- Dunniker Juniors
1927	Preston North End	0	(0)
1929–1930	Nottingham Forest	1	(0)
1930–1931	Thames	1	(0)
1931	Morton	6	(0)
- Young Boys
- * Club domestic league appearances and goals

John Cook Venters (22 August 1910 – 1978) was a Scottish professional footballer who played as an inside right in the Scottish League for Morton. He also played in the Football League for Nottingham Forest and Thames.

== Personal life ==
Venters father Sandy and brothers Alex and Andrew were also footballers.

== Career statistics ==
Appearances and goals by club, season and competition
Club	Season	League			National Cup		Total	
Club	Season	Division	Apps	Goals	Apps	Goals	Apps	Goals
Nottingham Forest	1929–30	Second Division	1	0	0	0	1	0
Morton	1930–31	Scottish First Division	6	0	2	0	8	0
Career total			7	0	2	0	9	0
