= Jimmy Allan (footballer, born 1896) =

Scottish footballer and manager

Personal information
- Full name: James Russell Allan
- Date of birth: 29 June 1896
- Place of birth: Cowdenbeath, Scotland
- Date of death: 19 May 1982 (aged 85)
- Place of death: Dundee, Scotland
- Position: Inside left

Youth career
- Glencraig Celtic

Senior career*
Years	Team	Apps	(Gls)
- East Fife
- Cowdenbeath
- Falkirk

Managerial career
- 1939–1940: Dundee United
- 1941–1942: Dundee United
- * Club domestic league appearances and goals

Jimmy Allan (29 June 1896 – 19 May 1982) was a Scottish football player and manager. He played for East Fife, Cowdenbeath and Falkirk, and managed Dundee United.

== Early life ==
Jimmy Allan was born in Cowdenbeath, Fife in 1896.

== Playing career ==
Allan played junior football for Glencraig Celtic before going on to a brief playing career with East Fife, Cowdenbeath and Falkirk. He also played for Dundee's reserve team as a trialist. A part-time footballer, Allan was also a professional sprinter.

== Management career ==
He became Dundee United manager in 1939. In his nine months with the club, he led them to their first national final, reaching the Scottish War Emergency Cup final only to lose to Rangers. Allan resigned in July 1940 after the club closed for the 1940-41 season.

== Honours ==
=== Manager ===
==== Dundee United ====
- Emergency War Cup Runner-up: 1

1939–40
