= Drysdale (surname) =

Drysdale is a Scottish surname derived from the Scottish parish of Dryfesdale and may refer to:

== People ==
- Adelina Munro Drysdale (1896–1942), Argentine socialite
- Anne Drysdale (1792–1853), Scottish settler in Australia
- Art Drysdale (born 1939), Canadian celebrity gardener
- Bessie Drysdale (1871–1950), English teacher, suffragette and birth control campaigner
- Charles Vickery Drysdale (1874–1961), English electrical engineer, eugenicist, and social reformer
- Brian Drysdale (born 1943), English footballer
- Cliff Drysdale (born 1941), former professional tennis player and current tennis announcer
- Denise Drysdale (born 1947), Australian entertainer
- Don Drysdale (1936–1993), pitcher for the Los Angeles Dodgers, member of the Baseball Hall of Fame
- Dougal Drysdale, Professor Emeritus in Fire Safety Engineering at The University of Edinburgh
- Douglas Drysdale (1915–1984), Scottish nationalist
- Fred Drysdale, Australian politician
- Jamie Drysdale (born 2002), Canadian ice hockey player
- Jason Drysdale (born 1970), English footballer
- John Drysdale (disambiguation)
- Kathryn Drysdale (born 1981), English actress
- Kirsten Drysdale (born 1984), Australian television presenter and journalist
- Learmont Drysdale (1866–1909), Scottish composer
- Mahé Drysdale (born 1978), New Zealand rower
- Peter Drysdale (born 1938), Australian academic, Emeritus Professor of Economics and Visiting Fellow at The Australian National University
- Peter Drysdale (cricketer) (born 1989), New Zealand cricketer
- Pippin Drysdale (born 1943), Australian ceramicist and art instructor, Australia's highest earning ceramic artist
- Robert Drysdale, Brazilian jiu-jitsu black belt and retired professional mixed martial arts
- Russell Drysdale (1912–1981), Australian artist
- Sydney Drysdale, English lawn bowler
- William Drysdale (1876–1916), Scottish cricketer and soldier

== Fictional characters ==
- Hugh Ransom Drysdale, from the American mystery film Knives Out
- Milburn Drysdale, from the American television series The Beverly Hillbillies
