= Tommy Adamson =

Scottish footballer

Thomas Adamson was a Scottish professional footballer who played as an inside left. Playing for junior side Lochee Harp, Adamson signed for Dundee United in August 1937, although – like most of the club's playing staff – he was released at the end of the season. After playing for Forfar Athletic, Adamson returned to Tannadice Park for the 1939-40 season, where he played in the Emergency War Cup Final before being called up for active service. Returning to play at the end of the 1944-45 season, it is unknown where Adamson went after leaving United.

== Honours ==
- Emergency War Cup Runner-up: 1

1939–40
