= Tim Dornan =

British physician, endocrinologist and medical educationalist

Tim Dornan (born 1950) is a British physician, endocrinologist and medical educationalist. He is professor at the School of Medicine, Dentistry and Biomedical Sciences at the Queen's University Belfast. He was formerly Professor of Medical Education at Maastricht University, where he is now Professor Emeritus. He has been a visiting professor at Aarhus University, the University of Dundee and the University of British Columbia. Dornan's work has been cited over 10,000 times, nearly 40,000 times if counting two collective articles. His main research interest is clinical workplace learning and especially the application of social learning theories and qualitative methodologies to medical education.

Dornan studied medicine as well as history and philosophy of science at the University of Cambridge and the University of Oxford, and qualified as a doctor at Oxford in 1975. He worked in Oxford and Nottingham, obtained a clinical research doctorate at Oxford and was a postdoctoral researcher in Seattle. He since worked as a consultant internist and endocrinologist in Manchester, and became Undergraduate Dean at Hope Hospital. From the 1990s he focused increasingly on education, and in 2010 he became Professor of Medical Education at Maastricht University. He was also an Honorary Professor at the University of Manchester. In 2014 he became Professor of Medical Education at the Queen's University Belfast.
