= Robert Keyes (footballer) =

Scottish footballer

Bobby Keyes
Personal information
- Full name: Robert McCracken Keyes
- Date of birth: 1910
- Place of birth: Bellshill, Scotland
- Date of death: 1970 (aged 59–60)
- Place of death: Airdrie, Scotland
- Height: 5 ft 8 1/2 in (1.74 m)
- Position: Centre forward

Senior career*
Years	Team	Apps	(Gls)
–	Larkhall Thistle		
1932–1935	Morton	88	(65)
1935–1941	Falkirk	140	(101)
Total		228	(166)

International career
1939	Scottish League XI	1	(1)
- * Club domestic league appearances and goals

Robert McCracken Keyes (1910–1970) was a Scottish footballer who played for Morton and Falkirk, mainly as a centre forward. He signed for Falkirk in January 1935, with the club being relegated at the end of that season; however he scored 30 goals from 25 appearances as the Bairns won the 1935–36 Scottish Division Two title to reclaim their place in the top tier, and then amassed a further 54 goals in 58 games over the next two seasons as they consolidated their place in Division One. His career was curtailed by the outbreak of World War II, during which he played in unofficial competitions with Falkirk for 18 months, then for two years with Motherwell.

Keyes was selected once for the Scottish Football League XI in 1939 (two days before the war began), scoring one of the goals in a 3–2 win over the Irish League.
