= Francis Moulds =

Scottish footballer

Personal information
- Full name: Francis Moulds
- Date of birth: 13 October 1910
- Place of birth: Kilmarnock, Scotland
- Date of death: 31 December 1958 (aged 48)
- Place of death: Kilmarnock, Scotland
- Position: Centre half

Youth career
- Cambuslang Rangers

Senior career*
| Years | Team | Apps | (Gls) |
| 1933–1944 | St Johnstone | | |
| 1939–1940 | Kilmarnock (wartime guest) | | |
| 1940–1941 | Dumbarton (wartime guest) | 1 | (0) |
- * Club domestic league appearances and goals

Francis Moulds (13 October 1910 - 24 November 1973) was a Scottish footballer who played for St Johnstone, Kilmarnock and Dumbarton.
