= John Drysdale (cricketer) =

Australian cricketer

Personal information
- Born: 1862; Castlemaine, Victoria, Australia
- Died: 15 February 1923 (aged 60–61); Melbourne, Australia

Domestic team information
- Years: Team
- 1888-1890: Victoria
- Source: Cricinfo, 25 July 2015

John Drysdale (1862 – 15 February 1923) was an Australian cricketer. He played seven first-class cricket matches for Victoria between 1888 and 1890.

== See also ==
- List of Victoria first-class cricketers
