= 1940–41 Southern League Cup (Scotland) =

Scottish football tournament

The Southern League Cup 1940–41 was the first edition of the regional war-time football tournament.

== Group stage ==
=== Group A ===
Team	Pld	W	D	L	GF	GA	GD	Pts
Celtic	6	4	0	2	13	12	+1	8
Partick Thistle	6	3	1	2	15	12	+3	7
Motherwell	6	2	1	3	16	16	0	5
Airdrieonians	6	2	0	4	11	15	−4	4

=== Group B ===
Team	Pld	W	D	L	GF	GA	GD	Pts
St Mirren	6	5	1	0	13	12	+1	11
Hamilton Academical	6	3	2	1	15	12	+3	8
Albion Rovers	6	1	1	4	16	16	0	3
Morton	6	1	0	5	11	15	−4	2

=== Group C ===
Team	Pld	W	D	L	GF	GA	GD	Pts
Rangers	6	5	0	1	23	17	+6	10
Falkirk	6	3	1	2	9	10	+1	7
Dumbarton	6	2	1	3	11	19	−8	4
Third Lanark	6	1	0	6	10	13	−3	3

=== Group D ===
Team	Pld	W	D	L	GF	GA	GD	Pts
Heart of Midlothian	6	4	0	2	14	7	+7	8
Hibernian	6	3	1	2	15	15	0	7
Clyde	6	2	1	3	12	14	−2	5
Queen's Park	6	1	2	3	4	9	−5	4

== Semi-finals ==
Heart of Midlothian	2 – 0	Celtic	Easter Road, Edinburgh
Rangers	4 – 1	St Mirren	Hampden Park, Glasgow

== Final ==
10 May 1941

Heart of Midlothian	1–1	Rangers
Walker 36'		Marshall 53'

Hampden Park, Glasgow
Attendance: 69,000
Referee: P. Craigmyle

=== Replay ===
17 May 1941

Heart of Midlothian	2–4	Rangers
Hamilton 44' 70'		Venters 11'; Smith 30'; Thornton 86'; Johnston 90'

Hampden Park, Glasgow
Attendance: 90,428
Referee: P. Craigmyle

=== Teams ===
Heart of Midlothian:
GK	Willie Waugh
RB	Duncan McClure
LB	Archie Miller
RH	Jimmy Philp
CH	Jimmy Dykes
LH	Tommy Brown
OR	Tommy Dougan
IR	Tommy Walker
CF	George Hamilton
IL	Alex Massie
OL	Robert Christie
Replay:	Unchanged

Rangers:
GK	Jerry Dawson
RB	Dougie Gray
LB	Jock Shaw
RH	Bobby Bolt
CH	Willie Woodburn
LH	Scot Symon
OR	Torry Gillick
IR	Willie Thornton
CF	Jimmy Smith
IL	David Marshall
OL	Charlie Johnston
Replay:	Alex Venters replaced Marshall.
