= Henry Dornan =

Scottish footballer

Personal information
- Full name: Henry Dornan
- Date of birth: 14 February 1916
- Place of birth: Stevenston
- Date of death: 4 December 1990 (aged 74)
- Place of death: Kilwinning
- Position: Full back

Youth career
- Ardeer Recreation

Senior career*
Years	Team	Apps	(Gls)
1939–1946	Kilmarnock		
1940–1941	Dumbarton (wartime guest)	27	
1941–1943	Celtic (wartime guest)		
- * Club domestic league appearances and goals

Henry Dornan (14 February 1916 – 4 December 1990) was a Scottish footballer who played for Kilmarnock and made 'guest' appearances during the Second World War for Dumbarton and Celtic.
