= Archie Miller (footballer) =

Scottish footballer

Personal information
- Full name: Archibald Miller
- Date of birth: 5 September 1913
- Place of birth: Larkhall, Scotland
- Date of death: 14 July 2006 (aged 92)
- Place of death: Motherwell, Scotland
- Position: Wing half

Youth career
- Royal Albert

Senior career*
Years	Team	Apps	(Gls)
1931–1947	Heart of Midlothian	122	(11)
- → Falkirk (wartime guest)
1947–1948	Blackburn Rovers	6	(0)
1948–1950	Kilmarnock	16	(0)
1950–1951	Carlisle United	1	(0)
1951	Heart of Midlothian	0	(0)
1951–1952	Workington	1	(0)
Total		146	(11)

International career
1938	Scottish League XI	1	(0)
1938	Scotland	1	(0)
- * Club domestic league appearances and goals

Archibald Miller (5 September 1913 – 14 July 2006) was a Scottish footballer, who played for Heart of Midlothian, Falkirk (wartime guest), Blackburn Rovers, Kilmarnock, Carlisle United, Workington and Scotland.
