= John Drysdale (footballer) =

Scottish footballer

Personal information
- Full name: John Drysdale
- Date of birth: 2 December 1913
- Place of birth: Dunfermline, Scotland
- Date of death: 1965 (aged 51–52)
- Place of death: Dunfermline, Scotland
- Position: Right half

Senior career*
Years	Team	Apps	(Gls)
- Tranent Juniors
1933–1934	Queen's Park	0	(0)
1934–1939	Rangers	18	(5)
1938–1947	Kilmarnock	36	(3)
1940–1941	→ Dumbarton (guest)		
1947–1948	St Cuthbert Wanderers		
1948–1949	Newton Stewart		
1949	St Cuthbert Wanderers		
- * Club domestic league appearances and goals

John Drysdale (2 December 1913 – 1965) was a Scottish footballer who played for Queen's Park, Rangers, Kilmarnock and Dumbarton. His main position was right half, but he is also recorded as featuring at centre forward (scoring five times in nine league appearances for Rangers in that role during the 1935–36 season), centre half (seven appearances as the Gers won the Scottish Football League title in 1936–37) and right back.
