= 1939–40 in Scottish football =

Football in Scotland
- Season: 1939–40

1939–40 in Scottish football

Division One champions
- Abandoned

Division Two champions
- Abandoned

Emergency league competition champions
- Rangers

Scottish War Emergency Cup winners
- Rangers

Junior Cup winners
- Maryhill

The 1939–40 season was the 67th season of competitive football in Scotland. It would have been the 50th season of the Scottish Football League, but the outbreak of the Second World War on 3 September 1939 caused the suspension of the league after five rounds of games played in Division One, and four rounds in Division Two. The league was not officially competed for until the 1946–47 season, but regional leagues were played during these years.

== League competitions ==
=== Scottish League Division One ===
Pos	Team	Pld	W	D	L	GF	GA	GD	Pts
1	Rangers	5	4	1	0	14	3	+11	9
2	Falkirk	5	4	0	1	20	10	+10	8
3	Heart of Midlothian	5	2	2	1	14	9	+5	6
4	Aberdeen	5	3	0	2	9	9	0	6
5	Partick Thistle	5	2	2	1	7	7	0	6
6	Celtic	5	3	0	2	7	8	−1	6
7	Albion Rovers	5	2	1	2	12	7	+5	5
8	Motherwell	5	2	1	2	14	12	+2	5
9	Third Lanark	5	2	1	2	9	8	+1	5
10	Kilmarnock	5	2	1	2	10	9	+1	5
11	Queen of the South	5	2	1	2	10	9	+1	5
12	St Mirren	5	1	3	1	8	8	0	5
13	Hamilton Academical	5	2	1	2	7	11	−4	5
14	Arbroath	5	2	0	3	9	9	0	4
15	St Johnstone	5	2	0	3	7	8	−1	4
16	Hibernian	5	2	0	3	11	13	−2	4
17	Alloa Athletic	5	2	0	3	8	13	−5	4
18	Ayr United	5	2	0	3	10	17	−7	4
19	Clyde	5	1	0	4	10	14	−4	2
20	Cowdenbeath	5	1	0	4	6	18	−12	2

=== Scottish League Division Two ===
Pos	Team	Pld	W	D	L	GF	GA	GD	Pts
1	Dundee	4	3	1	0	13	5	+8	7
2	Dunfermline Ath	4	2	2	0	10	5	+5	6
3	King's Park	4	2	2	0	11	7	+4	6
4	East Fife	4	2	1	1	12	6	+6	5
5	Queen's Park	4	1	3	0	7	5	+2	5
6	Stenhousemuir	4	2	1	1	6	5	+1	5
7	Dundee United	4	2	1	1	8	7	+1	5
8	Dumbarton	4	2	1	1	9	9	0	5
9	East Stirlingshire	4	1	2	1	7	7	0	4
10	St Bernard's	4	1	2	1	7	7	0	4
11	Airdrieonians	4	2	0	2	7	8	−1	4
12	Edinburgh City	4	1	1	2	9	8	+1	3
13	Montrose	4	1	1	2	7	8	−1	3
14	Raith Rovers	4	1	1	2	8	12	−4	3
15	Morton	4	1	1	2	4	7	−3	3
16	Leith Athletic	4	1	0	3	4	7	−3	2
17	Brechin City	4	0	2	2	3	8	−5	2
18	Forfar Athletic	4	0	0	4	7	18	−11	0

== Emergency League ==
The Scottish League officially suspended its competition on 13 September 1939 and set up a committee to investigate the possibility of regional league competitions. These were rubber-stamped on 26 September after the Home Secretary had granted permission, they commenced a month later. There were two divisions: eastern and western, each consisting of 16 clubs. This left six of the previous league clubs: Montrose, Brechin City, Forfar Athletic, Leith Athletic, Edinburgh City and East Stirlingshire.

Cowdenbeath resigned halfway through the season; they had played all the other clubs once, and so their record was allowed to stand. The competition was completed by a play-off between the two divisional winners, Rangers and Falkirk. Rangers won 2–1 at Ibrox Park.

=== Play-off ===
1 June 1940

Rangers	2–1	Falkirk
Venters 25'; Little 84'		Napier 60'

Ibrox Park, Glasgow
Attendance: 15,000
Referee: P. Craigmyle

== Other honours ==
=== Cup honours ===
==== National ====
Competition	Winner	Score	Runner-up
War Emergency Cup	Rangers	1–0	Dundee United
Scottish Junior Cup	Maryhill	1–0	Morton Juniors

==== County ====
Competition	Winner	Score	Runner-up
Dumbartonshire Cup	Dumbarton	4 – 2	Vale of Leven
East of Scotland Shield	Hearts	3 – 2	Hibernian
Forfarshire Cup	Arbroath	2 – 0	Dundee
Glasgow Cup	Rangers	3 – 1	Queen's Park
Lanarkshire Cup	Motherwell	1 – 0	Hamilton
North of Scotland Cup	Clachnacuddin	5 – 2	Rothes
Perthshire Cup	Black Watch	12 – 4 (Note: Aggregate over two legs.)	Blairgowrie
Renfrewshire Cup	St Mirren	4 – 1	Morton

=== Non-league honours ===
==== Senior ====
Division	Winner
Highland Emergency League	Inverness Thistle

== See also ==
- 1939–40 Rangers F.C. season
- Association football during World War II
- Scotland national football team results (unofficial matches)
