= Scottish War Emergency Cup =

1940 football tournament

The Scottish War Emergency Cup was a temporary competition held at the start of the Second World War, due to the suspension of the Scottish Cup by the SFA. It was held between February and May in 1940, the competition involved all sixteen League clubs still operating at the time, Cowdenbeath later withdrew which meant Dunfermline Athletic received a bye in the first round. Rangers beat Dundee United 1–0 in the Final.

All match details are sourced to the Scottish Football Historical Archive.

== First round ==
Dunfermline Athletic received a bye in the first round due to Cowdenbeath's withdrawal.

=== First legs ===
24 February 1940	Albion Rovers	3–3	Aberdeen
	Burke; Dempsey		Ferguson; Patillo	Attendance: 5,500

24 February 1940	Alloa	1–4	Rangers
	Gillan		Duncanson; Thornton; Waddell	Attendance: 7,000

24 February 1940	Celtic	4–2	Raith Rovers
	Crum; Divers; Gould		Murray; Kinnear	Attendance: 6,200

24 February 1940	Clyde	3–1	East Fife
	Noble; Wallace		Adams	Attendance: 4,500

24 February 1940	Dumbarton	4–3	Arbroath
	Dunn; Milne; Lang		Miller; Mudie	Attendance: 4,500

24 February 1940	Dundee	1–1	Third Lanark
	McGillivray		Dewar	Attendance: 6,320

24 February 1940	Falkirk	5–0	Hibernian
	Dawson; Keys; Napier; Carruthers			Attendance: 7,060

24 February 1940	Hamilton Academical	7–1	Stenhousemuir
	McIntyre; Wilson; McKerrell; Harrison		Buchan	Attendance: 3,500

24 February 1940	St Johnstone	2–1	Heart of Midlothian
	Lorimer; Hird		Brown	Attendance: 4,300

24 February 1940	Kilmarnock	1–0	Ayr United
	Gallacher			Attendance: 8,630

24 February 1940	King's Park	4–6	Motherwell
	Stewart; McDowall; Ferrier		McInally; Wales; McCulloch; Wood; Bremner	Attendance: 3,330

24 February 1940	Partick Thistle	2–4	Dundee United
	Morrison; Picken		Gardiner; Adamson; Kerr	Attendance: 5,210

24 February 1940	Queen's Park	3–2	Airdrieonians
	Kyle; Aitken; Ferguson		Gillick; Reid	Attendance: 7,650

24 February 1940	St Bernard's	1–5	Morton
	Philp		McGarry; Calder; Milne	Attendance: 5,070

24 February 1940	St Mirren	6–0	Queen of the South
	Linwood; Caskie			Attendance: 10,000

=== Second legs ===
2 March 1940	Aberdeen	0–1 (3–4 agg.)	Albion Rovers
			Bell	Attendance: 8,841

2 March 1940	Airdrieonians	3–1 (5–4 agg.)	Queen's Park
	Flavell; Mooney; Reid		Mitchell	Attendance: 8,000

2 March 1940	Arbroath	0–2 (3–6 agg.)	Dumbarton
			Dunn	Attendance: 2,150

2 March 1940	Ayr United	2–2 (2–3 agg.)	Kilmarnock
	Marshall; McKenzie		Collins; Thomson	Attendance: 9,940

2 March 1940	Dundee United	1–1 (5–3 agg.)	Partick Thistle
	Fraser		Sharp	Attendance: 8,000

2 March 1940	East Fife	1–0 (2–3 agg.)	Clyde
	McLeod			Attendance: 3,100

2 March 1940	Heart of Midlothian	5–0 (6–2 agg.)	St Johnstone
	Phillips; Briscoe; Brook			Attendance: 7,974

2 March 1940	Hibernian	4–0 (4–5 agg.)	Falkirk
	Finnigan; Nutley; Cuthbertson			Attendance: 4,520

2 March 1940	Morton	5–0 (10–1 agg.)	St Bernard's
	Calder; Turnbull; Martin			Attendance: 3,400

2 March 1940	Motherwell	3–2 (9–6 agg.)	King's Park
	Ogilvie; Bremner; Wood		Binnie; Black	Attendance: 2,792

2 March 1940	Queen of the South	4–1 (7–4 agg.)	St Mirren
	Connor; Lang; Law		Brady	Attendance: 3,800

2 March 1940	Raith Rovers	3–0 (5–4 agg.)	Celtic
	Lyons (o.g.) (o.g.); Hume; Tulip			Attendance: 5,463

2 March 1940	Rangers	2–2 (6–3 agg.)	Alloa
	Venters; Waddell		Rice; Fitzsimmons	Attendance: 8,000

2 March 1940	Stenhousemuir	4–1 (5–8 agg.)	Hamilton Academical
	Buchan; Rodi; Allan		McIntyre

2 March 1940	Third Lanark	3–1 (4–2 agg.)	Dundee
	Sinclair; Dewar; Dykes		Adam

== Second round ==
9 March 1940	Clyde	3–1	Dunfermline Athletic
	Agnew; Beaton; McLaren		Johnston	Attendance: 7,000

9 March 1940	Dumbarton	0–2	Airdrieonians
			Reid; Flavell	Attendance: 5,500

9 March 1940	Dundee United	7–1	Third Lanark
	Gardiner; Kerr; Milne; Adamson		Joyner	Attendance: 8,000

9 March 1940	Falkirk	0–0	Rangers
				Attendance: 16,000

9 March 1940	Hamilton Academical	0–2	St Mirren
			Deakin; Brady	Attendance: 8,000

9 March 1940	Heart of Midlothian	2–1	Raith Rovers
	Phillips; Walker		Kinnear	Attendance: 9,951

9 March 1940	Kilmarnock	2–1	Albion Rovers
	Collins; McGrogan		McKinlay	Attendance: 7,586

9 March 1940	Morton	1–1	Motherwell
	Milne		Bremner	Attendance: 8,688

=== Replays ===
11 March 1940	Motherwell	5–2	Morton
	McCulloch; Ogilvie; Bremner		McPhie; Keys	Attendance: 8,600

11 March 1940	Rangers	3–2	Falkirk
	Thornton; Venters		Calder; Fyfe	Attendance: 46,000

== Quarter-finals ==
23 March 1940

Airdrieonians	0–0	Heart of Midlothian

Attendance: 14,000

23 March 1940

Dundee United	3–0	Kilmarnock
Milne; Fraser; Gardiner

Attendance: 14,000

23 March 1940

Motherwell	3–0	Clyde
Bremner; McCulloch

Attendance: 12,673

23 March 1940

Rangers	3–1	St Mirren
Thornton; McNee; Smith		Brady

Attendance: 60,000

=== Replay ===
The match was abandoned after 117 minutes due to poor light.

1 April 1940

Heart of Midlothian	2–2 (a.e.t.)	Airdrieonians
Carruth; Baxter		Reid; Mooney

Attendance: 19,949

=== Second replay ===
1 April 1940

Heart of Midlothian	3–4	Airdrieonians
Walker (pen.); Phillips		Mooney; Flavell; Reid; Farr

Attendance: 20,000

== Semi-finals ==
13 April 1940

Rangers	4–1	Motherwell
Thornton; Smith; Venters		McCulloch

Hampden Park, Glasgow
Attendance: 50,000

13 April 1940

Dundee United	0–0	Airdrieonians

Easter Road, Edinburgh
Attendance: 22,000

=== Replay ===
17 April 1940

Dundee United	3–1	Airdrieonians
Glen; Adamson; Dunsmore		Reid

Easter Road, Edinburgh
Attendance: 22,000

== Final ==
4 May 1940

Rangers	1–0	Dundee United
Smith

Hampden Park, Glasgow
Attendance: 75,000
Referee: W Webb

=== Teams ===
Dundee United:
GK	(Scotland) Charlie Thomson
RB	(Scotland) Alex Miller
LB	(Scotland) Tommy Dunsmore
RH	(Scotland) Arthur Baxter
CH	(Scotland) Jimmy Littlejohn
LH	(Scotland) Jimmy Robertson
RW	(Scotland) Alex Glen
IR	(Scotland) Bobby Gardiner
CF	(Scotland) Arthur Milne
IL	(Scotland) Tommy Adamson
LW	(Scotland) Norman Fraser
Manager:
(Scotland) Jimmy Allan

Rangers:
GK	(Scotland) Jerry Dawson
RB	(Scotland) Dougie Gray
LB	(Scotland) Jock Shaw
RH	(Scotland) Bobby Bolt
CH	(Scotland) Willie Woodburn
LH	(Scotland) Tom McKillop
RW	(Scotland) Willie Waddell
IR	(Scotland) Willie Thornton
CF	(Scotland) Jimmy Smith
IL	(Scotland) Alex Venters
LW	(Scotland) Adam Little
Manager:
(Scotland) Bill Struth
