= Adam Little =

Scottish footballer

Personal information
- Full name: Adam Little
- Date of birth: 1 September 1919
- Place of birth: Blantyre, Scotland
- Date of death: 12 June 2008 (aged 88)
- Place of death: Erskine, Scotland
- Position: Midfielder

Senior career*
| Years | Team | Apps | (Gls) |
| 1936–1951 | Rangers | 6 | (0) |
- → Blantyre Victoria (loan)
| 1951–1955 | Morton | 114 | (1) |
- * Club domestic league appearances and goals

Adam Little (1 September 1919 – 12 June 2008) was a Scottish football player who played during the 1940s and 1950s for Rangers and Morton. Little was also a fully qualified doctor.

== Career ==
Little was born in Blantyre and educated at Rutherglen Academy. It was while playing for the school team that he was scouted by then Rangers manager Bill Struth and the next day signed for the club aged 17. Struth decided to loan Little out to play for Blantyre Victoria to get much needed experience.

He returned to Rangers and played six first-team games after the Second World War. The war had interrupted his footballing career. Little served as a captain in the Royal Army Medical Corps. Upon returning to Rangers he made six top team appearances before moving to Greenock with Morton for a spell then retiring from professional football.

Little also guested for Arsenal during the war.
