= Alex Venters =

Scottish footballer

Personal information
- Full name: Alexander Venters
- Date of birth: 9 June 1913
- Place of birth: Cowdenbeath, Scotland
- Date of death: 30 April 1959 (aged 45)
- Place of death: Cowdenbeath, Scotland
- Position: Inside forward

Senior career*
Years	Team	Apps	(Gls)
- South End Rovers
–1930	St Andrews United		
1930–1933	Cowdenbeath	96	(36)
1933–1946	Rangers	175	(89)
1946–1947	Third Lanark	8	(2)
1947–1948	Blackburn Rovers		
1948	Raith Rovers	4	(0)

International career
1933–1939	Scotland	3	(0)
1935–1939	Scottish League XI	4	(1)
1940–1943	Scotland (wartime)	4	(1)
- * Club domestic league appearances and goals

Alexander Venters (9 June 1913 – 30 April 1959) was a Scottish footballer, who played for Cowdenbeath, Rangers and Scotland.

== Career ==
Alex Venters, an inside forward, joined Rangers in November 1933 after his first club Cowdenbeath. He spent a total of 13 years at Ibrox Park, winning three Scottish league titles (1935, 1937 and 1939), two Scottish Cups (1935, 1936) and scoring 102 goals in 201 appearances. 18 of these 102 goals came against Celtic in various competitions. In the last season before association football was suspended due to World War II (1939) Venters was top scorer in the Scottish First Division (35 goals). Venters was also a prolific scorer during World War II; however, as these games were unofficial, his additional 53 wartime goals cannot be added to his official goalscoring record.

After the war, Venters played for Third Lanark, Blackburn Rovers and ended his career with Raith Rovers.

Between 1933 and 1939 he won three caps for Scotland, the first of which was against Ireland in 1933 while with Cowdenbeath. He won a further two official caps (both in matches against England) while at Rangers, in 1936 and 1939. He also played in four wartime internationals.

In 1959 he died prematurely from a heart attack at the age of 45.

Due to his prolific goalscoring in the 1930s and his great record in Old Firm matches he became a member of the Rangers Hall of Fame in 2006.

== Personal life ==
Venters' father Sandy and brothers Andrew and Jock were also footballers.
